= Athletics at the 2006 Asian Games – Women's 4 × 100 metres relay =

Women's 4 × 100 metres relay at the 2006 Asian Games
- Venue: Khalifa International Stadium
- Dates: 12 December 2006
- Competitors: 28 from 7 nations

Medalists
gold medal	China; Wang Jing, Chen Jue, Han Ling, Qin Wangping
silver medal	Japan; Tomoko Ishida, Momoko Takahashi, Takarako Nakamura, Sakie Nobuoka
bronze medal	Chinese Taipei; Lin Yi-chun, Chuang Shu-chuan, Chen Ying-ru, Yu Sheue-an

The women's 4 × 100 metres relay competition at the 2006 Asian Games in Doha, Qatar was held on 12 December 2006 at the Khalifa International Stadium.

== Schedule ==
All times are Arabia Standard Time (UTC+03:00)

Date	Time	Event
Tuesday, 12 December 2006	16:45	Final

== Records ==
Prior to this competition, the existing world, Asian and Games records were as follows.

World Record	East Germany	41.37	Canberra, Australia	6 October 1985
Asian Record	China	42.23	Shanghai, China	23 October 1997
Games Record	China	43.36	Bangkok, Thailand	15 December 1998

== Results ==
Legend

- DSQ — Disqualified

Rank	Team	Time	Notes
1st place, gold medalist(s)	China (CHN); Wang Jing; Chen Jue; Han Ling; Qin Wangping	44.33	
2nd place, silver medalist(s)	Japan (JPN); Tomoko Ishida; Momoko Takahashi; Takarako Nakamura; Sakie Nobuoka	44.87	
3rd place, bronze medalist(s)	Chinese Taipei (TPE); Lin Yi-chun; Chuang Shu-chuan; Chen Ying-ru; Yu Sheue-an	45.86	
4	Sri Lanka (SRI); Geethani Pathma Kumari; Premila Priyadharshani; Sujani Buddika; Susanthika Jayasinghe	46.03	
5	India (IND); H. M. Jyothi; Deepthi Jose; Nidhi Singh; Poonam Tomar	46.29	
—	Thailand (THA); Sangwan Jaksunin; Orranut Klomdee; Jutamass Tawoncharoen; Nongnuch Sanrat	DSQ	
—	Kuwait (KUW); Mona Al-Mubarak; Hanan Al-Khamis; Danah Al-Nasrallah; Alaa Al-Saffar	DSQ	
