= Kaori Sakagami (athlete) =

Japanese sprinter

Personal information
- Nationality: Japanese
- Born: Kaori Yoshida; 12 May 1974 (age 52) Fukui, Japan
- Education: Kanazawa University Graduate schools
- Height: 1.60 m (5 ft 3 in)
- Weight: 53 kg (117 lb)

Sport
- Country: Japan
- Sport: Track and field
- Event: 100 metres
- Retired: 23 September 2004

Achievements and titles
- Personal best: 100 m: 11.39 (2004)
Medal record
Women's athletics
Representing Japan
Asian Championships
Silver medal – second place	1998 Fukuoka	4×100 m relay
Silver medal – second place	2003 Manila	4×100 m relay
Bronze medal – third place	1991 Kuala Lumpur	4×100 m relay
East Asian Games
Silver medal – second place	1997 Busan	100 m
Silver medal – second place	1997 Busan	4×100 m relay

Kaori Sakagami (坂上 香織, Sakagami Kaori; née Yoshida (吉田), born 12 May 1974 in Fukui) is a Japanese retired sprinter. She competed in the 4 × 100 metres relay at the 1997 World Championships, 1999 World Championships and 2003 World Championships. She was also the reserve relay member at the 1991 World Championships. She held the national record (11.56 seconds and 11.42 seconds), national university record (11.56 seconds) and national junior high school record (12.12 seconds) in the 100 metres.

== Personal bests ==
Event	Time (s)	Competition	Venue	Date	Notes
100 m	11.39 (wind: +1.1 m/s)	Japanese Championships	Tottori, Japan	4 June 2004	
100 m	11.29 (wind: +3.4 m/s)	Hokuriku Region Government University Athletic Meet	Fukui, Japan	9 July 2000	Wind-assisted

== International competition ==
Year	Competition	Venue	Position	Event	Time (s)
Representing Japan
1991	Asian Championships	Kuala Lumpur, Malaysia	3rd	4×100 m relay	45.25 (relay leg: 1st)
1995	Universiade	Fukuoka, Japan	21st (qf)	100 m	11.95 (wind: +1.0 m/s)
1995	Universiade	Fukuoka, Japan	5th	4×100 m relay	44.80 (relay leg: 3rd)
1997	East Asian Games	Busan, South Korea	2nd	100 m	11.49 (wind: +2.5 m/s)
1997	East Asian Games	Busan, South Korea	2nd	4×100 m relay	45.16 (relay leg: 3rd)
1997	World Championships	Athens, Greece	15th (sf)	4×100 m relay	44.56 (relay leg: 2nd)
1998	Asian Championships	Fukuoka, Japan	(h)	100 m	12.05 (wind: -2.2 m/s)
1998	Asian Championships	Fukuoka, Japan	2nd	4×100 m relay	44.45 (relay leg: 1st)
1999	World Championships	Seville, Spain	14th (h)	4×100 m relay	44.80 (relay leg: 3rd)
2000	Asian Championships	Jakarta, Indonesia	8th	100 m	11.83 (wind: -1.0 m/s)
2000	Asian Championships	Jakarta, Indonesia	5th	4×100 m relay	45.26 (relay leg: 4th)
2002	Asian Games	Busan, South Korea	10th (h)	100 m	11.80 (wind: +0.6 m/s)
2002	Asian Games	Busan, South Korea	4th	4×100 m relay	44.59 (relay leg: 4th)
2003	World Championships	Paris, France	15th (h)	4×100 m relay	44.57 (relay leg: 3rd)
2003	Asian Championships	Manila, Philippines	6th	100 m	11.90 (wind: -0.2 m/s)
2003	Asian Championships	Manila, Philippines	2nd	4×100 m relay	44.56 (relay leg: 2nd)

== National titles ==
- Japanese Championships
  - 100 m: 1997, 2004
