= Tomoko Ishida =

Japanese sprinter (born 1977)

Personal information
- Nationality: Japanese
- Born: 12 May 1977 (age 49) Niiza, Saitama, Japan
- Education: Saitama University
- Height: 1.57 m (5 ft 2 in)
- Weight: 54 kg (119 lb)

Sport
- Country: Japan
- Sport: Track and field
- Event(s): 100 metres 4×100 metres relay
- Retired: March 2013

Achievements and titles
- Personal best: 100 m: 11.45 (Tottori 2004)
Medal record
Women's athletics
Representing Japan
Asian Games
Silver medal – second place	2006 Doha	4×100 m relay
Asian Championships
Silver medal – second place	2003 Manila	4×100 m relay
Silver medal – second place	2007 Amman	4×100 m relay
Bronze medal – third place	2005 Incheon	4×100 m relay
East Asian Games
Silver medal – second place	2001 Osaka	4×100 m relay

Tomoko Ishida (石田 智子, Ishida Tomoko; born 12 May 1977 in Niiza, Saitama) is a retired Japanese sprinter who specialized in the 100 metres. She competed in the 4 × 100 meters relay at the 2003 World Championships and 2005 World Championships without qualifying for the final. She was the 2005 Japanese national champion in the 100 meters and former Japanese national record holder in the 4 × 100 meters relay.

She currently coach for the Hasegawa Sports Facilities Athletic Club.

== Personal best ==
Event	Time (s)	Competition	Venue	Date
100 m	11.45 (wind: +1.1 m/s)	Japanese Championships	Tottori, Japan	4 June 2004

== International competition ==
Year	Competition	Venue	Position	Event	Time
Representing Japan
1998	Asian Games	Bangkok, Thailand	5th	4×100 m relay	44.80 (relay leg: 1st)
2001	East Asian Games	Osaka, Japan	9th	100 m	13.01 (wind: +1.1 m/s)
2001	East Asian Games	Osaka, Japan	2nd	4×100 m relay	44.24 (relay leg: 2nd)
2002	Asian Games	Busan, South Korea	4th	4×100 m relay	44.59 (relay leg: 1st)
2003	World Championships	Paris, France	15th (h)	4×100 m relay	44.57 (relay leg: 1st)
2003	Asian Championships	Manila, Philippines	7th	100 m	11.94 (wind: -0.2 m/s)
2003	Asian Championships	Manila, Philippines	2nd	4×100 m relay	44.56 (relay leg: 4th)
2005	World Championships	Helsinki, Finland	14th (h)	4×100 m relay	44.52 (relay leg: 1st) SB
2005	Asian Championships	Incheon, South Korea	5th	100 m	11.85 (wind: +0.3 m/s)
2005	Asian Championships	Incheon, South Korea	3rd	4×100 m relay	44.85 (relay leg: 1st)
2006	Asian Games	Doha, Qatar	2nd	4×100 m relay	44.87 (relay leg: 1st)
2007	Asian Championships	Amman, Jordan	5th	100 m	11.69 (wind: +3.1 m/s)
2007	Asian Championships	Amman, Jordan	2nd	4×100 m relay	45.06 (relay leg: 1st)

== National title ==
- Japanese Championships
  - 100 m: 2005
