= Sakie Nobuoka =

Japanese sprinter

Personal information
- Born: 24 August 1977 (age 48) Yamaguchi Prefecture, Japan
- Education: Waseda University Graduate School
- Height: 1.64 m (5 ft 5 in)
- Weight: 54 kg (119 lb)

Sport
- Sport: Athletics
- Event(s): 100 metres 200 metres
- Retired: September 2012

Achievements and titles
- Personal best(s): 100 m: 11.47 (2006) 200 m: 23.33 (2004) 400 m: 54.11 (1999)
Medal record
Women's athletics
Representing Japan
Asian Games
Silver medal – second place	2006 Doha	4×100 m relay
Asian Championships
Silver medal – second place	2000 Jakarta	4×400 m relay
Silver medal – second place	2002 Colombo	4×400 m relay
Bronze medal – third place	1998 Fukuoka	4×400 m relay
Bronze medal – third place	2005 Incheon	4×100 m relay
Silver medal – second place	2007 Amman	4×100 m relay
East Asian Games
Silver medal – second place	2001 Osaka	4×400 m relay

Sakie Nobuoka (信岡 沙希重, Nobuoka Sakie; born 24 August 1977 in Yamaguchi Prefecture) is a Japanese former sprinter who specialised in the 200 metres. She represented her country at three outdoor and one indoor World Championships. She held the national records in the 200 metres (23.33 seconds), the 4 × 100 metres relay (43.67 seconds) and the 4 × 400 metres relay (3:33.06 minutes).

== International competitions ==
Year	Competition	Venue	Position	Event	Notes
Representing Japan
1998	Asian Championships	Fukuoka, Japan	8th	200 m	24.48
1998	Asian Championships	Fukuoka, Japan	3rd	4 × 400 m relay	3:35.71
1998	Asian Games	Bangkok, Thailand	8th	200 m	24.48
1998	Asian Games	Bangkok, Thailand	4th	4 × 400 m relay	3:38.61
1999	World Indoor Championships	Maebashi, Japan	16th (h)	400 m	54.11
1999	World Indoor Championships	Maebashi, Japan	6th	4 × 400 m relay	3:41.47
2000	Asian Championships	Jakarta, Indonesia	13th (h)	200 m	24.77
2000	Asian Championships	Jakarta, Indonesia	5th	4 × 100 m relay	45.26
2000	Asian Championships	Jakarta, Indonesia	2nd	4 × 400 m relay	3:37.15
2001	East Asian Games	Osaka, Japan	6th	200 m	23.98
2001	East Asian Games	Osaka, Japan	2nd	4 × 400 m relay	3:33.06
2001	World Championships	Edmonton, Canada	13th (h)	4 × 400 m relay	3:33.51
2002	Asian Championships	Colombo, Sri Lanka	8th	200 m	25.13 (w)
2002	Asian Championships	Colombo, Sri Lanka	5th	4 × 100 m relay	45.74
2002	Asian Championships	Colombo, Sri Lanka	2nd	4 × 400 m relay	3:38.29
2003	Asian Championships	Manila, Philippines	11th (h)	200 m	24.77
2005	World Championships	Helsinki, Finland	14th (h)	4 × 100 m relay	44.52
2005	Asian Championships	Incheon, South Korea	4th	200 m	24.02
2005	Asian Championships	Incheon, South Korea	3rd	4 × 100 m relay	44.85
2006	Asian Games	Doha, Qatar	6th	200 m	23.98
2006	Asian Games	Doha, Qatar	2nd	4 × 100 m relay	44.87
2007	Asian Championships	Amman, Jordan	2nd	4 × 100 m relay	45.06
2007	World Championships	Osaka, Japan	35th (h)	200 m	23.74
2007	World Championships	Osaka, Japan	–	4 × 100 m relay	DQ

== National titles ==
- Japanese Championships
  - 100 m: 2006
  - 200 m: 2004, 2005, 2006, 2007, 2008
  - 4 × 100 m relay: 1998, 1999

== Personal bests ==
Outdoor

- 100 metres – 11.47 (Azusa 2006)
- 200 metres – 23.33 (+0.4 m/s, Tottori 2004)
- 400 metres – 54.64 (Yokohama 2001)

Indoor

- 200 metres – 24.51 (Yokohama 2002)
- 400 metres – 54.11 (Maebashi 1999)
