= Athletics at the 2013 SEA Games – Women's 4 × 100 metres relay =

The women's 4 × 100 metres relay at the 2013 SEA Games, the athletics was held in Naypyidaw, Myanmar. The track and field events took place at the Wunna Theikdi Stadiumon December 16.

== Schedule ==
All times are Myanmar Standard Time (UTC+06:30)

Date	Time	Event
Monday, 16 December 2013	15:30	Final

== Records ==
Prior to this competition, the existing world, Asian, and Southeast Asian Games records were as follows.

World Record	United States	40.82	London, Great Britain	10 August 2012
Asian Record	China	42.23	Shanghai, China	23 October 1997
Games Record	Thailand	44.00	Nakhon Ratchasima, Thailand	10 December 2007

== Results ==
Legend

- DSQ — Disqualified

Rank	Lane	Nation	Competitors	Time	Notes
1st place, gold medalist(s)	3	Thailand (THA)	Phatsorn Jaksuninkorn, Neeranuch Klomdee, Tassaporn Wannakit, Nongnuch Sanrat	44.42	
2nd place, silver medalist(s)	6	Vietnam (VIE)	Mai Thi Phuong, Nguyen Thi Ngoc Tham, Do Thi Quyen, Vu Thi Huong	44.99	
3rd place, bronze medalist(s)	4	Indonesia (INA)	Lusiana Satriani, Tri Setyo Utami, Niafatul Aini, Ni Nyoman Kerni	45.88	
4	2	Myanmar (MYA)	Tin Zar Moe, Aye Aye Than, Su Kyi Aung, Lai Lai Win	47.82	
—	5	Malaysia (MAS)	Zaidatul Husna Zulkifli, Komalam Shally Selvaretnam, Zaidatul Husniah Zulkifli, Nurul Faizah Asma Mazlan	DSQ	
