= Athletics at the 2002 Asian Games – Women's 4 × 100 metres relay =

Women's 4 × 100 metres relay at the 2002 Asian Games
- Venue: Busan Asiad Main Stadium
- Dates: 13 October 2002
- Competitors: 28 from 7 nations

Medalists
gold medal	China; Zeng Xiujun, Yan Jiankui, Huang Mei, Qin Wangping
silver medal	Thailand; Jutamass Tawoncharoen, Supavadee Khawpeag, Orranut Klomdee, Trecia Roberts
bronze medal	Uzbekistan; Anna Kazakova, Guzel Khubbieva, Lyudmila Dmitriadi, Lyubov Perepelova

The women's 4 × 100 metres relay competition at the 2002 Asian Games in Busan, South Korea was held on 13 October at the Busan Asiad Main Stadium.

== Schedule ==
All times are Korea Standard Time (UTC+09:00)

Date	Time	Event
Sunday, 13 October 2002	10:00	Final

== Records ==
Prior to this competition, the existing world, Asian and Games records were as follows.

World Record	East Germany	41.37	Canberra, Australia	6 October 1985
Asian Record	China	42.23	Shanghai, China	23 October 1997
Games Record	China	43.36	Bangkok, Thailand	15 December 1998

== Results ==
Legend

- DNS — Did not start

Rank	Team	Time	Notes
1st place, gold medalist(s)	China (CHN); Zeng Xiujun; Yan Jiankui; Huang Mei; Qin Wangping	43.84	
2nd place, silver medalist(s)	Thailand (THA); Jutamass Tawoncharoen; Supavadee Khawpeag; Orranut Klomdee; Trecia Roberts	44.25	
3rd place, bronze medalist(s)	Uzbekistan (UZB); Anna Kazakova; Guzel Khubbieva; Lyudmila Dmitriadi; Lyubov Perepelova	44.32	
4	Japan (JPN); Tomoko Ishida; Motoka Arai; Ayumi Suzuki; Kaori Sakagami	44.59	
5	India (IND); Valdivel Jayalakshmi; Vinita Tripathi; Anuradha Biswal; Saraswati Saha	44.74	
6	South Korea (KOR); Park Kyong-jin; Won Yun-bun; Cha Eun-jung; Oh Hyung-mi	46.09	
—	Sri Lanka (SRI); Jani Chathurangani; Anoma Sooriyaarachchi; Susanthika Jayasinghe; Damayanthi Dharsha	DNS	
