= Ni Xiaoli =

Chinese sprinter (born 1983)

Medal record

Women's athletics

Representing China

Asian Championships
Gold medal – first place	2002 Colombo	4×100 m
Silver medal – second place	2005 Incheon	4×100 m
Bronze medal – third place	2003 Manila	4×100 m
Bronze medal – third place	2005 Incheon	200 m

Ni Xiaoli (born 29 January 1983) is a Chinese sprinter who specialized in the 200 metres.

She won the silver medal at the 2002 Asian Games and the bronze medal at the 2005 Asian Championships.

Her personal best time is 23.12 seconds, achieved in September 2004 in Hefei.
