= Athletics at the 2002 Asian Games – Women's 100 metres =

Women's 100 metres at the 2002 Asian Games
- Venue: Busan Asiad Main Stadium
- Dates: 8 October 2002
- Competitors: 16 from 10 nations

Medalists
gold medal	Susanthika Jayasinghe	Sri Lanka
silver medal	Lyubov Perepelova	Uzbekistan
bronze medal	Qin Wangping	China

The women's 100 metres competition at the 2002 Asian Games in Busan, South Korea was held on 8 October at the Busan Asiad Main Stadium.

== Schedule ==
All times are Korea Standard Time (UTC+09:00)

Date	Time	Event
Tuesday, 8 October 2002	11:50	1st round
Tuesday, 8 October 2002	16:20	Final

== Records ==
Prior to this competition, the existing world, Asian and Games records were as follows.

World Record	Florence Griffith Joyner (USA)	10.49	Indianapolis, United States	16 July 1988
Asian Record	Li Xuemei (CHN)	10.79	Shanghai, China	18 October 1997
Games Record	Liu Xiaomei (CHN)	11.27	Hiroshima, Japan	14 October 1994

== Results ==
=== 1st round ===
- Qualification: First 3 in each heat (Q) and the next 2 fastest (q) advance to the final.

==== Heat 1 ====
- Wind: +0.6 m/s

Rank	Athlete	Time	Notes
1	Susanthika Jayasinghe (SRI)	11.16	Q, GR
2	Qin Wangping (CHN)	11.54	Q
3	Viktoriya Kovyreva (KAZ)	11.56	Q
4	Saraswati Saha (IND)	11.61	q
5	Orranut Klomdee (THA)	11.64	q
6	Kaori Sakagami (JPN)	11.80	
7	Chen Shu-chuan (TPE)	11.98	
8	Oh Hyung-mi (KOR)	12.14	

==== Heat 2 ====
- Wind: +0.6 m/s

Rank	Athlete	Time	Notes
1	Lyubov Perepelova (UZB)	11.43	Q
2	Huang Mei (CHN)	11.58	Q
3	Guzel Khubbieva (UZB)	11.69	Q
4	Motoka Arai (JPN)	11.70	
5	Supavadee Khawpeag (THA)	11.81	
6	Shamsunnahar Chumki (BAN)	12.30	
7	Cha Eun-jung (KOR)	12.31	
8	Rachita Mistry (IND)	12.62	

=== Final ===
- Wind: −0.1 m/s

Rank	Athlete	Time	Notes
1st place, gold medalist(s)	Susanthika Jayasinghe (SRI)	11.15	GR
2nd place, silver medalist(s)	Lyubov Perepelova (UZB)	11.38	
3rd place, bronze medalist(s)	Qin Wangping (CHN)	11.51	
4	Viktoriya Kovyreva (KAZ)	11.53	
5	Orranut Klomdee (THA)	11.57	
6	Huang Mei (CHN)	11.58	
7	Saraswati Saha (IND)	11.59	
8	Guzel Khubbieva (UZB)	11.69	
