= Saori Kitakaze =

Japanese sprinter

Personal information
- Nationality: Japan
- Born: 3 April 1985 (age 41) Kushiro, Hokkaidō, Japan
- Height: 1.51 m (4 ft 11 in)
- Weight: 47 kg (104 lb)

Sport
- Sport: Track and field
- Event: 100 metres
- University team: Hokusho University
- Retired: 2016

Achievements and titles
- Personal bests: 100 m: 11.42 (Hiroshima 2008); 200 m: 24.55 (Sapporo 2007); 60 m: 7.52 (Tehran 2004)
Medal record
Women's athletics
Representing Japan
Asian Championships
Silver medal – second place	2007 Amman	4×100 m relay
Silver medal – second place	2013 Pune	4×100 m relay
Silver medal – second place	2015 Wuhan	4×100 m relay
Asian Indoor Championships
Bronze medal – third place	2004 Tehran	60 m
East Asian Games
Gold medal – first place	2005 Macau	4×100 m relay

Saori Kitakaze (北風 沙織, Kitakaze Saori; born April 3, 1985 in Kushiro) is a Japanese track and field sprint athlete who specializes in the 100 metres. She is the joint Japanese record holder in the 4×100 m relay, having run a time of 43.39 seconds alongside Momoko Takahashi, Chisato Fukushima and Kana Ichikawa at the 2011 Seiko Golden Grand Prix.

He first international competitions came in 2004, when she took the bronze medal over 60 metres at the 2004 Asian Indoor Athletics Championships and reached the 100 m semi-finals at that year's World Junior Championships in Athletics. The following year she came fourth at the 2005 East Asian Games before helping the Japanese women to the 4×100 m relay title.

An appearance on the continental stage followed at the 2006 Asian Games (where she was seventh in the 100 m final) and a relay silver medal came at the 2007 Asian Athletics Championships. Kitakaze earned her first global level selection for Japan that year, but her relay team was disqualified in the preliminary rounds of the 2007 World Championships in Athletics.

== Personal bests ==
Event	Time	Wind	Venue	Date
Outdoor
100 m	11.42 s	+1.7 m/s	Hiroshima, Japan	29 April 2008
200 m	24.55 s	-0.6 m/s	Sapporo, Japan	27 May 2007
Indoor
60 m	7.52 s		Teheran, Iran	6 February 2004

== Records ==
- 4×100 m relay
  - Current Japanese record holder - 43.39 s (relay leg:1st) (Kawasaki, 8 May 2011)^{[a]}

^{a} with Momoko Takahashi, Chisato Fukushima, and Kana Ichikawa

== Competition record ==
Year	Competition	Venue	Position	Event	Notes
Representing Japan
2004	Asian Indoor Championships	Tehran, Iran	3rd	60 m	7.52
2004	World Junior Championships	Grosseto, Italy	20th (sf)	100 m	12.00 (wind: +0.1 m/s)
2004	World Junior Championships	Grosseto, Italy	20th (h)	4×100 m relay	45.80 (relay leg: 4th) NJR
2005	East Asian Games	Macau, China	4th	100 m	12.02 (wind: -1.3 m/s)
2005	East Asian Games	Macau, China	1st	4×100 m relay	44.88 (relay leg: 1st)
2006	Asian Games	Doha, Qatar	7th	100 m	11.94 (wind: +0.2 m/s)
2007	Asian Championships	Amman, Jordan	8th	100 m	11.76 (wind: +3.1 m/s)
2007	Asian Championships	Amman, Jordan	2nd	4×100 m relay	45.06 (relay leg: 4th)
2007	World Championships	Osaka, Japan	– (h)	4×100 m relay	DQ (relay leg: 1st)
2013	Asian Championships	Pune, India	2nd	4×100 m relay	44.38 (relay leg: 1st)
2014	World Relays	Nassau, Bahamas	18th (h)	4×100 m relay	44.66 (relay leg: 1st)
2015	Asian Championships	Wuhan, China	2nd	4×100 m relay	44.14 (relay leg: 1st)

=== National Championship ===
Year	Competition	Venue	Position	Event	Notes
2004	Japan Championships	Tottori, Tottori	8th	100 m	11.92 (wind: +1.1 m/s)
2005	Japan Championships	Tokyo	6th (sf)	100 m	11.93 (wind: +0.5 m/s)
2006	Japan Championships	Kobe, Hyōgo	5th	100 m	11.97 (wind: -1.0 m/s)
2007	Japan Championships	Osaka, Osaka	2nd	100 m	11.66 (wind: 0.0 m/s)
2008	Japan Championships	Kawasaki, Kanagawa	6th	100 m	11.90 (wind: +0.4 m/s)
2009	Japan Championships	Hiroshima, Hiroshima	– (sf)	100 m	DNS
2010	Japan Championships	Marugame, Kagawa	6th	100 m	11.76 (wind: +0.9 m/s)
2011	Japan Championships	Kumagaya, Saitama	7th	100 m	11.88 (wind: -0.6 m/s)
2012	Japan Championships	Osaka, Osaka	11th (h)	100 m	11.81 (wind: 0.0 m/s)
2013	Japan Championships	Chōfu, Tokyo	3rd	100 m	11.74 (wind: 0.0 m/s)
2014	Japan Championships	Fukushima, Fukushima	9th (h)	100 m	11.92 (wind: +0.7 m/s)
2015	Japan Championships	Niigata, Niigata	8th	100 m	12.00 (wind: -0.3 m/s)
2016	Japan Championships	Nagoya, Aichi	16th (h)	100 m	12.18 (wind: -1.7 m/s)
