= Athletics at the 2013 SEA Games – Women's 100 metres =

The women's 100 metres at the 2013 SEA Games was part of the athletics events held in Naypyidaw, Myanmar. The track and field events took place at the Wunna Theikdi Stadiumon December 17.

== Schedule ==
All times are Myanmar Standard Time (UTC+06:30)

Date	Time	Event
Tuesday, 17 December 2013	09:50	Heats
Tuesday, 17 December 2013	14:50	Final

== Records ==
Prior to this competition, the existing world, Asian, and Southeast Asian Games records were as follows.

World Record	Florence Griffith-Joyner (USA)	10.49	Indianapolis, United States	16 July 1988
Asian Record	Li Xuemei (CHN)	10.79	Shanghai, China	18 October 1997
Games Record	Lydia De Vega (PHI)	11.28	Jakarta, Indonesia	16 December 1987

== Results ==
Legend

- DSQ — Disqualified
- DNF — Do Not Finish

=== Round 1 ===
==== Heat 1 ====
- Wind: +0.4 m/s

Rank	Lane	Athlete	Time	Notes
1	5	Neeranuch Klomdee (THA)	11.85	
2	3	Zaidatul Husna Zulkifli (MAS)	12.13	
3	7	Nguyen Thi Ngoc Tham (VIE)	12.17	
4	2	Lai Lai Win (MYA)	12.42	
5	6	Seyha Chan (CAM)	12.75	
6	4	Serafi Unani (INA)	13.96	

==== Heat 2 ====
- Wind: -0.3 m/s

Rank	Lane	Athlete	Time	Notes
1	5	Vu Thi Huong (VIE)	11.75	
2	3	Tassaporn Wannakit (THA)	11.93	
3	2	Veronica Shanti Pereira (SIN)	12.04	
4	4	Kay Khine Lwin (MYA)	12.20	
5	6	Lusiana Satriani (INA)	12.23	
6	7	Komalam Shally Selvaretnam (MAS)	12.31	

=== Final ===
- Wind: -0.2 m/s

Rank	Lane	Athlete	Time	Notes
1st place, gold medalist(s)	3	Vu Thi Huong (VIE)	11.59	
2nd place, silver medalist(s)	6	Neeranuch Klomdee (THA)	11.85	
3rd place, bronze medalist(s)	4	Tassaporn Wannakit (THA)	11.91	
4	5	Veronica Shanti Pereira (SIN)	11.99	
5	7	Zaidatul Husna Zulkifli (MAS)	12.13	
6	8	Lusiana Satriani (INA)	12.20	
7	2	Kay Khine Lwin (MYA)	12.23	
8	1	Nguyen Thi Ngoc Tham (VIE)	12.31	
