= Nao Okabe =

Japanese sprinter (born 1988)

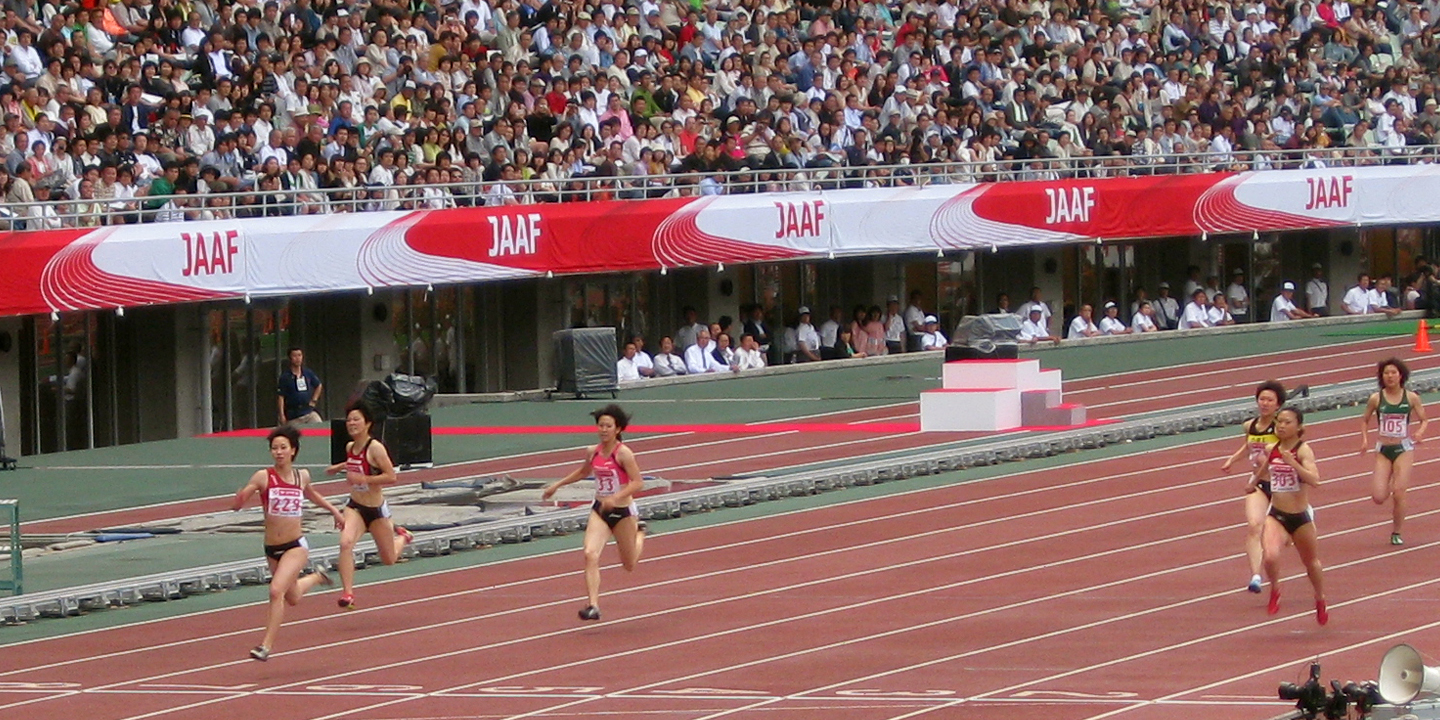
- Okabe (second left) at the 2012 Japanese Championships

Personal information
- Nationality: Japanese
- Born: 28 August 1988 (age 38) Chiba Prefecture, Japan
- Education: University of Tsukuba
- Height: 1.65 m (5 ft 5 in)
- Weight: 54 kg (119 lb)

Sport
- Country: Japan
- Sport: Track and field
- Event: 100 metres
- Retired: 2012

Achievements and titles
- Personal bests: 100 m: 11.62 (2011); 200 m: 23.75 (2011)
Medal record
Women's athletics
Representing Japan
Asian Championships
Gold medal – first place	2011 Kobe	4×100 m relay
Asian Junior Championships
Gold medal – first place	2006 Macau	100 m
Silver medal – second place	2006 Macau	4×100 m relay

Nao Okabe (岡部 奈緒, Okabe Nao; born 28 August 1988 in Chiba Prefecture) is a Japanese retired track and field sprinter who specialized in the 100 metres. She competed in the 4 × 100 meters relay at the 2011 World Championships without qualifying for the final. She also won a gold medal in the 4 × 100 metres relay at the 2011 Asian Championships, with teammates Momoko Takahashi, Chisato Fukushima and Saori Imai.

== Personal bests ==
Event	Time (s)	Competition	Venue	Date	Notes
100 m	11.62 (wind: +1.3 m/s)	East Japan Corporate Championships	Kumagaya, Japan	22 May 2011	
100 m	11.46 (wind: +2.6 m/s)	Mikio Oda Memorial	Hiroshima, Japan	29 April 2011	Wind-assisted
200 m	23.75 (wind: -0.7 m/s)	Shizuoka International Meet	Fukuroi, Japan	3 May 2011	

== International competition ==
Year	Competition	Venue	Position	Event	Time (s)
Representing Japan
2006	Asian Junior Championships	Macau, China	1st	100 m	11.76 (wind: -0.8 m/s)
2006	Asian Junior Championships	Macau, China	2nd	4×100 m relay	45.66 (relay leg: 2nd)
2006	World Junior Championships	Beijing, China	34th (h)	100 m	12.00 (wind: +0.3 m/s)
2006	World Junior Championships	Beijing, China	— (h)	4×100 m relay	DQ (relay leg: 2nd)
2011	Asian Championships	Kobe, Japan	4th	100 m	11.79 (wind: +1.9 m/s)
2011	Asian Championships	Kobe, Japan	1st	4×100 m relay	44.05 (relay leg: 1st)
2011	World Championships	Daegu, South Korea	10th (h)	4×100 m relay	43.83 (relay leg: 1st)
