= Qin Wangping =

Chinese sprinter (born 1982)

Medal record

Women's athletics

Representing China

Asian Championships
Gold medal – first place	2002 Colombo	4 × 100 m
Gold medal – first place	2005 Incheon	100 m
Silver medal – second place	2002 Colombo	100 m
Silver medal – second place	2003 Manila	100 m
Silver medal – second place	2005 Incheon	4 × 100 m
Bronze medal – third place	2003 Manila	4 × 100 m

Qin Wangping (born 16 June 1982 in Nantong, Jiangsu province) is a Chinese sprinter who specialized in the 100 metres. Her personal best time is 11.30 seconds, achieved in June 2000 in Jinzhou.

Qin represented China at the 2008 Summer Olympics in Beijing competing at the 4 × 100 metres relay together with Wang Jing, Jiang Lan and Tao Yujia. In their first round heat they placed fourth behind Jamaica, Russia and Germany. Their time of 43.78 seconds was the tenth time overall out of sixteen participating nations. With this result they failed to qualify for the final.

== International competitions ==
Year	Competition	Venue	Position	Event	Notes
Representing China
2000	Olympic Games	Sydney, Australia	45th (h)	200 m	24.10
2000	Olympic Games	Sydney, Australia	8th	4 × 100 m relay	44.87
2002	Asian Championships	Colombo, Sri Lanka	2nd	100 m	11.56
2002	Asian Championships	Colombo, Sri Lanka	1st	4 × 100 m relay	43.94
2002	World Cup	Madrid, Spain	7th	4 × 100 m relay	43.82
2002	Asian Games	Busan, South Korea	3rd	100 m	11.51
2002	Asian Games	Busan, South Korea	1st	4 × 100 m relay	43.84
2002	Asian Games	Busan, South Korea	3rd	4 × 400 m relay	3:32.43
2003	Universiade	Daegu, South Korea	1st	100 m	11.53
2003	Universiade	Daegu, South Korea	1st	4 × 100 m relay	44.09
2003	Asian Championships	Manila, Philippines	2nd	100 m	11.56
2003	Afro-Asian Games	Hyderabad, India	7th	100 m	12.17
2005	Asian Championships	Incheon, South Korea	1st	100 m	11.47
2005	Asian Championships	Incheon, South Korea	2nd	4 × 100 m relay	44.24
2006	World Indoor Championships	Moscow, Russia	27th (h)	60 m	7.81
2006	Asian Games	Doha, Qatar	5th	100 m	11.71
2006	Asian Games	Doha, Qatar	1st	4 × 100 m relay	44.33
2007	Universiade	Bangkok, Thailand	7th	4 × 100 m relay	45.77
