= Yuko Sato =

Yuko Sato or Yūko Satō may refer to:

- Yuko Sato (athlete) (佐藤 優子, born 1968), Japanese racewalker
- Yuko Sato (politician) (佐藤 夕子, born 1963), Japanese politician
- Yūko Satō (voice actress) (佐藤 ゆうこ), Japanese voice actress

== See also ==
- Yuka Sato (born 1973), Japanese figure skater
- Yuka Sato (triathlete) (born 1992), Japanese triathlete
- Yuka Sato (sprinter) (born 1981), Japanese sprinter
- Yuka Sato (javelin thrower) (born 1992), Japanese javelin thrower
