= 2005 Asian Athletics Championships – Women's 100 metres =

The women's 100 metres event at the 2005 Asian Athletics Championships was held in Incheon, South Korea on September 1–2.

== Medalists ==
Gold	Silver	Bronze
Qin Wangping; China	Guzel Khubbieva; Uzbekistan	Liang Yi; China

== Results ==
=== Heats ===
Wind: Heat 1: +0.6 m/s, Heat 2: 0.0 m/s

Rank	Heat	Name	Nationality	Time	Notes
1	2	Qin Wangping	China	11.45	Q
2	1	Guzel Khubbieva	Uzbekistan	11.59	Q
3	1	Liang Yi	China	11.67	Q
4	1	Nongnuch Sanrat	Thailand	11.88	Q
4	2	Tomoko Ota	Japan	11.88	Q
6	1	Yuka Sato	Japan	11.98	q
7	2	Oranut Klomdee	Thailand	12.18	Q
8	2	Poonam Tomar	India	12.19	q
9	2	Nursari Hafizzah Matasan	Brunei	12.37	NJR
10	1	Kim Ha-na	South Korea	12.49	SB
11	2	Kim Hyun-ran	South Korea	12.73	
12	1	Gretta Taslakian	Lebanon	12.74	SB
13	2	Alaa Hikmat	Iraq	12.80	PB
14	2	Sry Hang	Cambodia	13.48	PB
	1	Yelena Bobrovskaya	Kyrgyzstan	DNF	

=== Final ===
Wind: +0.3 m/s

Rank	Name	Nationality	Time	Notes
1st place, gold medalist(s)	Qin Wangping	China	11.47	
2nd place, silver medalist(s)	Guzel Khubbieva	Uzbekistan	11.56	
3rd place, bronze medalist(s)	Liang Yi	China	11.62	SB
4	Nongnuch Sanrat	Thailand	11.82	
5	Tomoko Ota	Japan	11.85	
6	Yuka Sato	Japan	11.89	
7	Oranut Klomdee	Thailand	11.92	
8	Poonam Tomar	India	11.96	
