= 2002 Asian Athletics Championships – Women's 100 metres =

The women's 100 metres event at the 2002 Asian Athletics Championships was held in Colombo, Sri Lanka on 9–10 August.

== Medalists ==
Gold	Silver	Bronze
Susanthika Jayasinghe; Sri Lanka	Qin Wangping; China	Lyubov Perepelova; Uzbekistan

== Results ==
=== Heats ===
Rank	Heat	Name	Nationality	Time	Notes
1	1	Susanthika Jayasinghe	Sri Lanka	11.40	Q
2	1	Lyubov Perepelova	Uzbekistan	11.65	Q
3	2	Guzel Khubbieva	Uzbekistan	11.68	Q
4	1	Qin Wangping	China	11.71	Q
5	2	Huang Mei	China	11.72	Q
6	1	Orranut Klomdee	Thailand	12.01	q
7	2	Pradeepa Herath	Sri Lanka	12.02	Q, SB
8	2	Chen Shu-Chuan	Chinese Taipei	12.05	q
9	1	Sriyani Kulawansa-Fonseka	Sri Lanka	12.13	SB
10	2	Mariko Matsumoto	Japan	12.14	
11	1	Ayumi Shimazaki	Japan	12.18	
12	2	Erum Khanum	Pakistan	12.34	PB
13	2	Nathalie Saykali	Lebanon	12.81	SB
14	1	Rima Taha Farid	Jordan	13.31	
15	2	Nashfa Amira	Maldives	13.72	PB

=== Final ===
Wind: +1.3 m/s

Rank	Name	Nationality	Time	Notes
1st place, gold medalist(s)	Susanthika Jayasinghe	Sri Lanka	11.29	
2nd place, silver medalist(s)	Qin Wangping	China	11.56	
3rd place, bronze medalist(s)	Lyubov Perepelova	Uzbekistan	11.60	
4	Guzel Khubbieva	Uzbekistan	11.82	
5	Huang Mei	China	11.83	
6	Orranut Klomdee	Thailand	11.95	
7	Chen Shu-Chuan	Chinese Taipei	12.09	
8	Pradeepa Herath	Sri Lanka	12.14	
