= 2003 Asian Athletics Championships – Women's 100 metres =

The women's 100 metres event at the 2003 Asian Athletics Championships was held in Manila, Philippines on September 20–21.

== Medalists ==
Gold	Silver	Bronze
Lyubov Perepelova; Uzbekistan	Qin Wangping; China	Guzel Khubbieva; Uzbekistan

== Results ==
=== Heats ===
Wind: Heat 1: +1.4 m/s, Heat 2: -0.3 m/s Heat 3: +0.5 m/s

Rank	Heat	Name	Nationality	Time	Notes
1	3	Lyubov Perepelova	Uzbekistan	11.24	Q, CR
2	1	Guzel Khubbieva	Uzbekistan	11.60	Q
3	1	Qin Wangping	China	11.66	Q
3	1	Orranut Klomdee	Thailand	11.66	Q
5	3	Kaori Sakagami	Japan	11.76	Q
6	1	Juthamas Thavoncharoen	Thailand	11.86	Q
6	2	Tomoko Ota	Japan	11.86	Q
8	2	Zhu Juanhong	China	11.91	Q
9	3	Jani Chathurangani Silva	Sri Lanka	11.98	Q
10	3	Deysie Natalia Sumigar	Indonesia	12.01	Q
11	1	Supiati	Indonesia	12.18	q
11	3	Mai Thi Phuong	Vietnam	12.18	q
13	3	Wan Kin Yee	Hong Kong	12.27	q
14	1	Alinawati Ali Akbar	Brunei	12.31	q, SB
15	2	Shamsun Nahar Chumky	Bangladesh	12.40	Q
16	2	Leslie Cercado	Philippines	12.44	Q, PB
17	2	Nguyen Thu Suong	Vietnam	12.55	PB
18	2	Sheena Hu Men En	Singapore	12.65	PB
19	1	Fouzia Huda Jui	Bangladesh	12.66	PB
20	3	Lee Yan Lin	Singapore	12.75	PB
21	3	Lai Choi Lok	Macau	12.81	SB
22	2	Badmaa Batkhuu	Mongolia	13.19	PB

=== Semifinals ===
Wind: Heat 1: -0.2 m/s, Heat 2: +0.3 m/s

Rank	Heat	Name	Nationality	Time	Notes
1	1	Lyubov Perepelova	Uzbekistan	11.31	Q
2	2	Guzel Khubbieva	Uzbekistan	11.51	Q
3	2	Orranut Klomdee	Thailand	11.69	Q
4	2	Zhu Juanhong	China	11.70	Q
5	1	Qin Wangping	China	11.75	Q
6	2	Tomoko Ota	Japan	11.84	Q
7	2	Juthamas Thavoncharoen	Thailand	11.85	
8	1	Kaori Sakagami	Japan	11.87	Q
9	1	Jani Chathurangani Silva	Sri Lanka	12.09	Q
9	2	Deysie Natalia Sumigar	Indonesia	12.09	
11	1	Mai Thi Phuong	Vietnam	12.17	SB
12	2	Wan Kin Yee	Hong Kong	12.20	
13	2	Supiati	Indonesia	12.24	
14	1	Shamsun Nahar Chumky	Bangladesh	12.26	NR
15	1	Leslie Cercado	Philippines	12.51	
	1	Alinawati Ali Akbar	Brunei	DNF	

=== Final ===
Wind: -0.2 m/s

Rank	Name	Nationality	Time	Notes
1st place, gold medalist(s)	Lyubov Perepelova	Uzbekistan	11.43	
2nd place, silver medalist(s)	Qin Wangping	China	11.56	
3rd place, bronze medalist(s)	Guzel Khubbieva	Uzbekistan	11.57	
4	Zhu Juanhong	China	11.62	
5	Orranut Klomdee	Thailand	11.65	
6	Kaori Sakagami	Japan	11.90	
7	Tomoko Ota	Japan	11.94	
8	Jani Chathurangani Silva	Sri Lanka	12.18	
