= 2005 Asian Athletics Championships – Women's 4 × 100 metres relay =

The women's 4 × 100 metres relay event at the 2005 Asian Athletics Championships was held in Incheon, South Korea on September 4.

== Results ==
| Rank | Team | Name | Time | Notes |
|---|---|---|---|---|
| 1st place, gold medalist(s) | Thailand | Sangwan Jaksunin, Orranut Klomdee, Juthamas Thavoncharoen, Nongnuch Sanrat | 44.18 | |
| 2nd place, silver medalist(s) | China | Jiang Zhiying, Liang Yi, Ni Xiaoli, Qin Wangping | 44.24 | |
| 3rd place, bronze medalist(s) | Japan | Tomoko Ota, Sakie Nobuoka, Yuka Sato, Rina Fujimaki | 44.85 | |
| 4 | Hong Kong | Leung Shuk Wa, Pang Hok Man, Wan Kin Yee, Chan Ho Yee | 46.61 | |
| 5 | South Korea | Kim Ha-na, Lee Ji-eun, Choi Ju-young, Lee Yeon-kyoung | 47.01 | |
