= Tassaporn Wannakit =

Thai sprinter (born 1989)

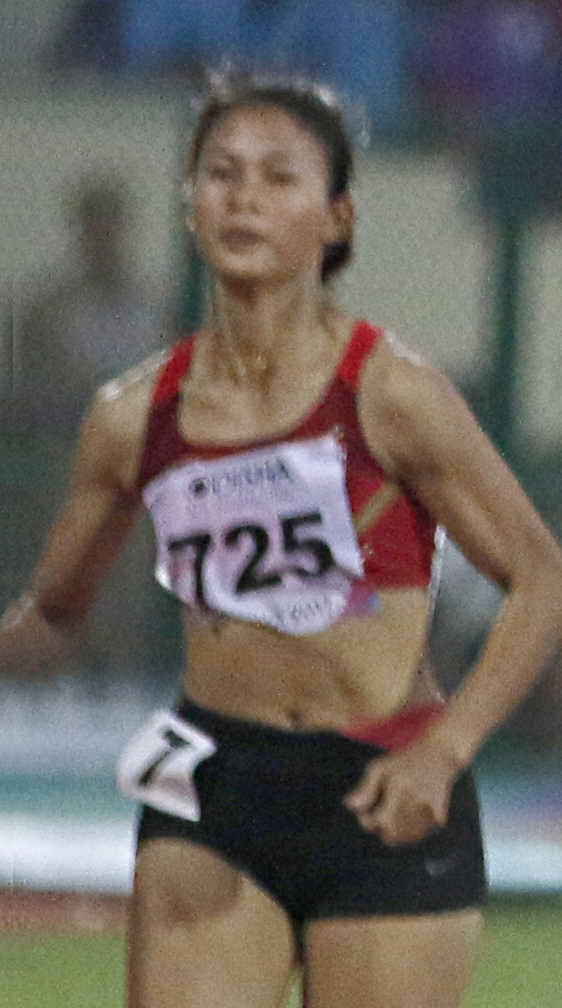
- in the 100m semi final in 2017

Personal information
- Born: November 23, 1989 (age 36) Bangkok, Thailand
- Height: 162 cm (5 ft 4 in)
- Weight: 58 kg (128 lb)

Sport
- Country: Thailand
- Sport: Thai sprinter
Medal record
Representing Thailand
Asian Junior Athletics Championships
Gold medal – first place	2008 Jakarta	4×100m relay
Silver medal – second place	2008 Jakarta	200m
Asian Athletics Championships
Bronze medal – third place	2013 Pune	4×100m relay
Bronze medal – third place	2015 Wuhan	4×100m relay
Southeast Asian Games
Gold medal – first place	2013 Naypyidaw	4 × 100m relay
Gold medal – first place	2015 Singapore	4 × 100m relay
Silver medal – second place	2015 Singapore	100m
Bronze medal – third place	2013 Naypyidaw	100m
Summer Universiade
Bronze medal – third place	2015 Gwangju	4×100m Relay

Tassaporn Wannakit (born 23 November 1989) is a Thai athlete specialising in the sprinting events. She won several medals on regional level, primarily in the 4 × 100 metres relay.

== Competition record ==
Year	Competition	Venue	Position	Event	Notes
Representing Thailand
2008	Asian Junior Championships	Jakarta, Indonesia	2nd	200 m	24.43
2008	Asian Junior Championships	Jakarta, Indonesia	1st	4 × 100 m relay	45.95
2008	World Junior Championships	Bydgoszcz, Poland	40th (h)	200 m	24.86
2008	World Junior Championships	Bydgoszcz, Poland	18th (h)	4 × 100 m relay	45.99
2009	Asian Championships	Guangzhou, China	10th (sf)	200 m	24.70
2010	Asian Games	Guangzhou, China	10th (h)	200 m	24.60
2011	Asian Championships	Kobe, Japan	10th (h)	200 m	24.89
2011	Universiade	Shenzhen, China	5th	4 × 100 m relay	44.13
2013	Asian Championships	Pune, India	3rd	4 × 100 m relay	44.44
2013	Universiade	Kazan, Russia	6th	4 × 100 m relay	45.66
2013	Southeast Asian Games	Naypyidaw, Myanmar	3rd	100 m	11.91
2013	Southeast Asian Games	Naypyidaw, Myanmar	1st	4 × 100 m relay	44.42
2014	Asian Games	Incheon, South Korea	8th	100 m	11.76
2014	Asian Games	Incheon, South Korea	4th	4 × 100 m relay	44.39
2015	Southeast Asian Games	Singapore	2nd	100 m	11.76
2015	Southeast Asian Games	Singapore	1st	4 × 100 m relay	44.27
2015	Asian Championships	Wuhan, China	3rd	4 × 100 m relay	44.73
2015	Universiade	Gwangju, South Korea	3rd	4 × 100 m relay	45.03
2017	Asian Championships	Bhubaneswar, India	15th (sf)	100 m	12.47
2017	Asian Championships	Bhubaneswar, India	4th	4 × 100 m relay	44.74
2019	Asian Championships	Doha, Qatar	5th	4 × 100 m relay	43.99
2019	World Relays	Yokohama, Japan	12th (h)	4 × 100 m relay	44.24

== Personal bests ==
Outdoor

- 100 metres – 11.64 (+0.1 m./s) (Andorf 2014)
- 200 metres – 24.41 (0.0 m./s) (Jakarta 2008)
