= 2011 Asian Athletics Championships – Women's 200 metres =

The women's 200 metres at the 2011 Asian Athletics Championships was held at the Kobe Universiade Memorial Stadium on 9 and 10 July.

== Medalists ==
Gold	Chisato Fukushima; Japan
Silver	Gretta Taslakian; Lebanon
Bronze	Saori Imai; Japan

== Records ==
2011 Asian Athletics Championships
World record	Florence Griffith-Joyner (USA)	21.34	Seoul, South Korea	29 September 1988
Asian record	Li Xuemei (CHN)	22.01	Shanghai, PR China	22 October 1997
Championship record	Damayanthi Darsha (SRI)	22.84	Jakarta, Indonesia	2000
	Susanthika Jayasinghe (SRI)	22.84	Colombo, Sri Lanka	2002

== Results ==
=== Round 1 ===
First 2 in each heat (Q) and 2 best performers (q) advanced to the Final.

Rank	Heats	Name	Nationality	Time	Notes
1	3	Chisato Fukushima	Japan	23.44	Q
2	1	Maryam Tousi	Iran	23.64	Q
3	2	Saori Imai	Japan	23.82	Q
4	1	Gretta Taslakian	Lebanon	23.87	Q
5	3	C.S.R. Rasnayaka Mudiyanselage	Sri Lanka	24.17	Q
6	2	Olga Bludova	Kazakhstan	24.20	Q
7	2	Liao Ching-Hsien	Chinese Taipei	24.35	q
8	2	Danah Abdulrazzaq	Iraq	24.73	
9	2	Liang Qiuping	China	24.84	
10	1	Tassaporn Wannakit	Thailand	24.89	
11	1	Jiang Lan	China	25.09	
11	3	Fong Yee Pui	Hong Kong	25.09	
13	3	Yelena Ryabova	Turkmenistan	25.13	
14	1	Afa Ismail	Maldives	26.09	NR
15	2	Leong Ka Man	Macau	26.97	
16	3	Tungalag Battsengel	Mongolia	27.74	
	1	~~Gulustan Ieso~~	Iraq	~~24.25~~	q, DQ

=== Final ===
Rank	Lane	Name	Nationality	Time	Notes
1st place, gold medalist(s)	7	Chisato Fukushima	Japan	23.49	
2nd place, silver medalist(s)	4	Gretta Taslakian	Lebanon	24.01	
3rd place, bronze medalist(s)	5	Saori Imai	Japan	24.06	
4	7	Olga Bludova	Kazakhstan	24.29	
5	8	Maryam Tousi	Iran	24.29	
6	6	C.S.R. Rasnayaka Mudiyanselage	Sri Lanka	24.41	
7	9	Liao Ching-Hsien	Chinese Taipei	24.65	
	3	~~Gulustan Ieso~~	Iraq	DQ	
