= 2007 Asian Athletics Championships – Women's 100 metres =

The women's 100 metres event at the 2007 Asian Athletics Championships was held in Amman, Jordan on July 25–26.

== Medalists ==
Gold	Silver	Bronze
Susanthika Jayasinghe; Sri Lanka	Vu Thi Huong; Vietnam	Zou Yingting; China

== Results ==
=== Heats ===
Rank	Heat	Name	Nationality	Time	Notes
1	1	Susanthika Jayasinghe	Sri Lanka	11.35	Q
2	1	Vu Thi Huong	Vietnam	11.72	Q
3	1	Oh Hyung-mi	South Korea	11.86	q
4	1	Wan Kin Yee	Hong Kong	12.??	
5	1	Choo Sze-Min Amanda	Singapore	12.44	
6	1	Sadaf Siddiqui	Pakistan	12.64	
7	1	Shifa Anabtawi	Jordan	13.??	
	1	Gharid Ghrouf	Palestine	DNS	
1	2	Zou Yingting	China	11.68	Q
2	2	Tomoko Ishida	Japan	11.86	Q
3	2	Buddika Sujani	Sri Lanka	11.96	q
4	2	Pacharin Jandang	Thailand	12.08	
5	2	Lin Yi-chun	Chinese Taipei	12.11	
6	2	Gretta Taslakian	Lebanon	12.4?	
7	2	Faten Abdulnabi	Bahrain	12.55	
8	2	Chandra Kala Thapa	Nepal	13.02	
1	3	Orranut Klomdee	Thailand	11.93	Q
2	3	Saori Kitakaze	Japan	11.99	Q
3	3	Chan Ho Yee	Hong Kong	12.34	
4	3	Ann Siao Mei	Singapore	12.59	
5	3	Rima Taha	Jordan	12.99	
6	3	Shaikha Al-Dosari	Qatar	13.93	
	3	Jung Soonok	South Korea	DNF	

=== Final ===
Wind: +3.1 m/s

Rank	Lane	Name	Nationality	Time	Notes
1st place, gold medalist(s)	3	Susanthika Jayasinghe	Sri Lanka	11.19	
2nd place, silver medalist(s)	6	Vu Thi Huong	Vietnam	11.33	
3rd place, bronze medalist(s)	4	Zou Yingting	China	11.54	
4	1	Buddika Sujani	Sri Lanka	11.66	
5	2	Tomoko Ishida	Japan	11.69	
6	5	Orranut Klomdee	Thailand	11.72	
7	8	Oh Hyung-mi	South Korea	11.75	
8	7	Saori Kitakaze	Japan	11.76	
