= 2017 Asian Athletics Championships – Women's 200 metres =

The women's 200 metres at the 2017 Asian Athletics Championships was held on 7 July.

== Medalists ==
| Gold | Viktoriya Zyabkina; Kazakhstan |
| Silver | Rumeshika Rathnayake; Sri Lanka |
| Bronze | Olga Safronova; Kazakhstan |

== Results ==
=== Heats ===
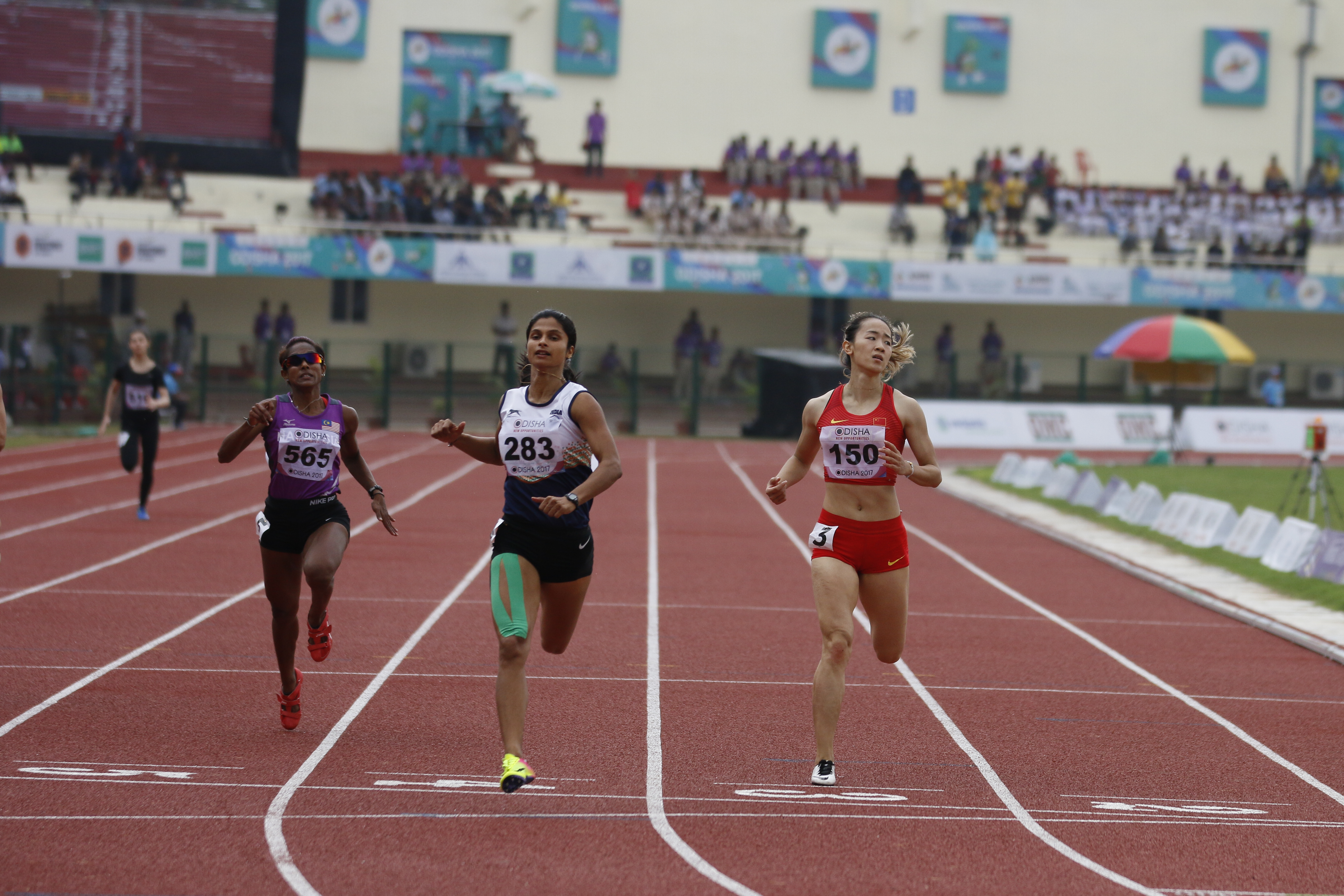
Heat 1

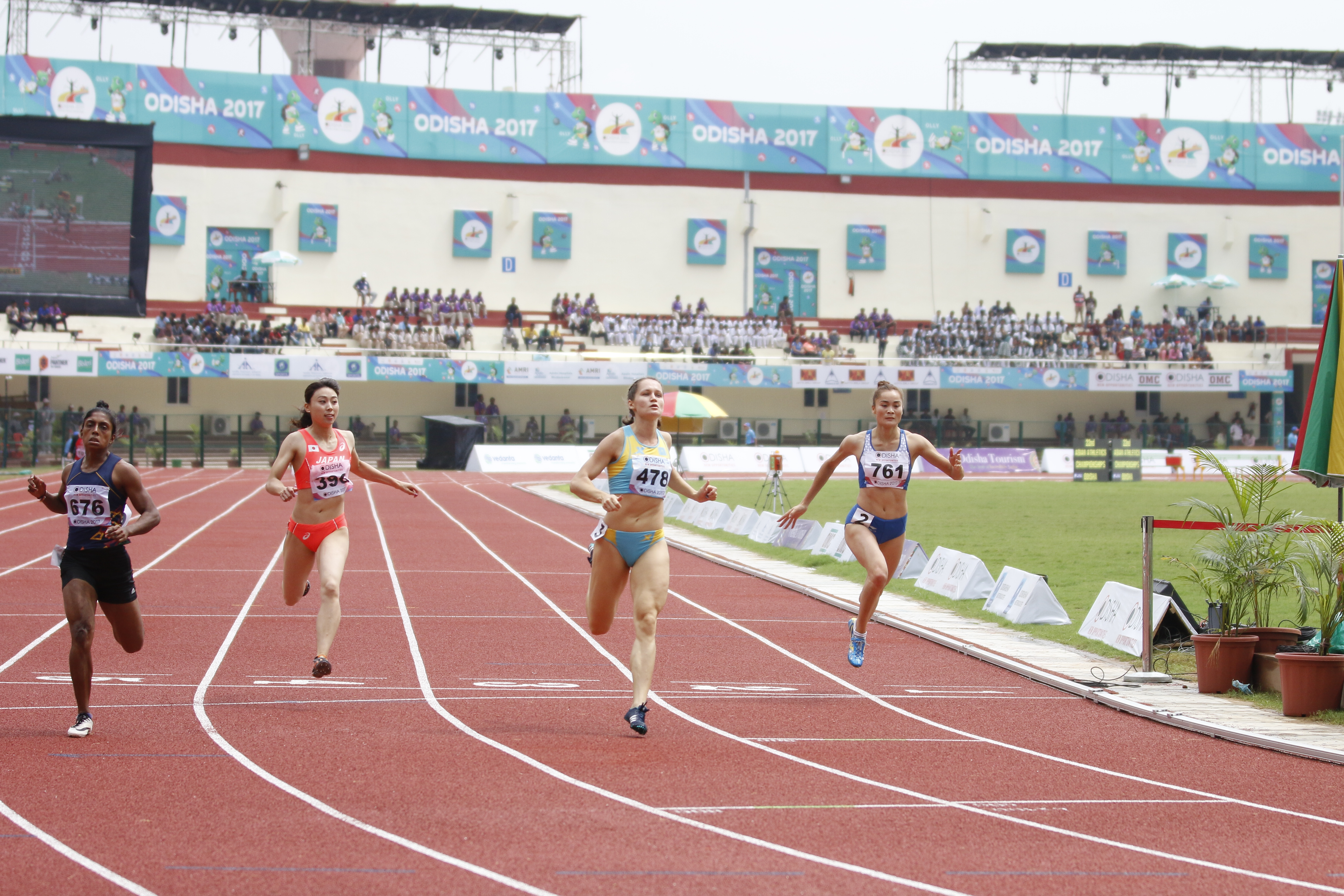
Heat 2

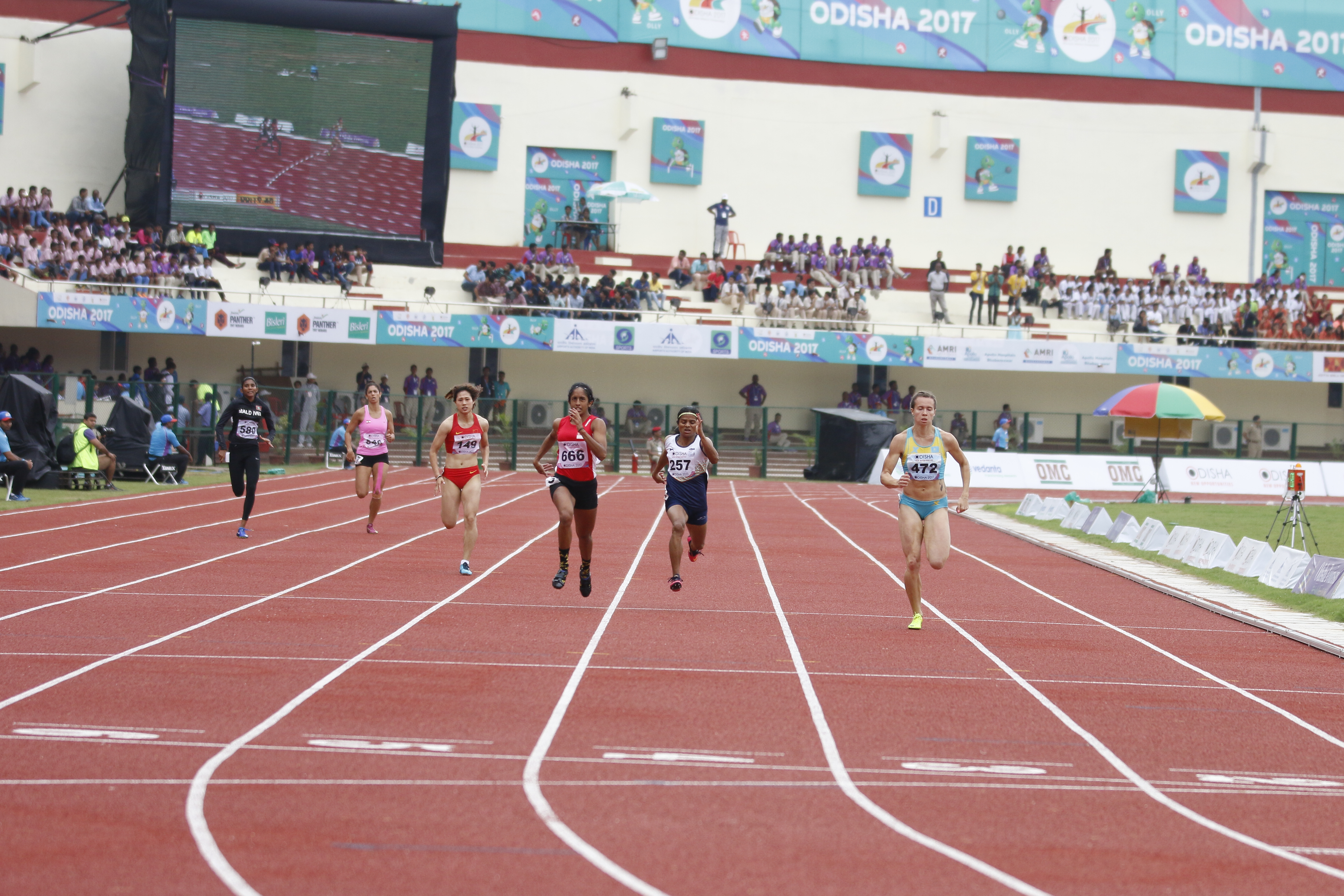
Heat 3

Qualification rule: First 2 in each heat (Q) and the next 2 fastest (q) qualified for the final.

Wind:
Heat 1: +1.3 m/s, Heat 2: +1.3 m/s, Heat 3: -0.9 m/s

| Rank | Heat | Name | Nationality | Time | Notes |
|---|---|---|---|---|---|
| 1 | 2 | Rumeshika Rathnayake | Sri Lanka | 23.40 | Q |
| 2 | 2 | Viktoriya Zyabkina | Kazakhstan | 23.49 | Q |
| 3 | 3 | Olga Safronova | Kazakhstan | 23.67 | Q |
| 4 | 2 | Kana Ichikawa | Japan | 23.72 | q |
| 5 | 3 | Dutee Chand | India | 23.84 | Q |
| 6 | 3 | Shanti Pereira | Singapore | 23.86 | q |
| 7 | 2 | Quách Thị Lan | Vietnam | 23.86 | |
| 8 | 2 | Nigina Sharipova | Uzbekistan | 23.97 | |
| 9 | 1 | Srabani Nanda | India | 24.01 | Q |
| 10 | 1 | Lin Huijun | China | 24.32 | Q |
| 11 | 1 | Komalam Shally | Malaysia | 24.53 | |
| 12 | 1 | Son Kyeong-mi | South Korea | 24.78 | |
| 13 | 3 | Sun Fengyan | China | 25.23 | |
| 14 | 1 | Susmita Ghosh | Bangladesh | 26.24 | |
| 15 | 3 | Afa Ismail | Maldives | 26.38 | |
| 16 | 3 | Diala El Khazen | Lebanon | 27.11 | |
| 17 | 1 | K. Hasan | Kuwait | 30.16 | |
| 18 | 2 | Shirzai Basira | Afghanistan | 34.47 | |
| | 2 | Duong Sreypheap | Cambodia | DNS | |
| | 3 | Tamara Awada | Lebanon | DNS | |

=== Final ===
Wind: -0.6 m/s

| Rank | Lane | Name | Nationality | Time | Notes |
|---|---|---|---|---|---|
| 1st place, gold medalist(s) | 6 | Viktoriya Zyabkina | Kazakhstan | 23.10 | |
| 2nd place, silver medalist(s) | 3 | Rumeshika Rathnayake | Sri Lanka | 23.43 | |
| 3rd place, bronze medalist(s) | 4 | Olga Safronova | Kazakhstan | 23.47 | |
| 4 | 7 | Dutee Chand | India | 23.59 | |
| 5 | 5 | Srabani Nanda | India | 23.67 | |
| 6 | 5 | Kana Ichikawa | Japan | 23.68 | |
| 7 | 1 | Shanti Pereira | Singapore | 23.80 | |
| 8 | 8 | Lin Huijun | China | 24.10 | |
