= Athletics at the 2007 SEA Games =

- Venue: His Majesty the King's 80th Birthday Anniversary, 5 December 2007, Sports Complex
- Location: Nakhon Ratchasima, Thailand
- Date: 7–11 December 2007
- Nations: 11

The athletics events at the 2007 SEA Games were held at the Main Stadium in His Majesty the King's 80th Birthday Anniversary, 5th December 2007 Sports Complex, Nakhon Ratchasima from 7 to 11 December.

== Medal table ==
* Host nation (Thailand)

Rank	Nation	Gold	Silver	Bronze	Total
1	Thailand (THA)*	17	19	9	45
2	Vietnam (VIE)	8	4	5	17
3	Indonesia (INA)	7	7	5	19
4	Malaysia (MAS)	7	3	9	19
5	Philippines (PHI)	5	7	9	21
6	Singapore (SIN)	1	0	1	2
7	Myanmar (MYA)	0	4	5	9
8	Cambodia (CAM)	0	1	1	2
9	Brunei (BRU)	0	0	1	1
Totals (9 entries)		45	45	45	135

== Medal summary ==
=== Men ===
Event	Gold		Silver		Bronze	
100 m (Wind: -0.1 m/s)	Suryo Agung Wibowo; Indonesia	10.25	Wachara Sondee; Thailand	10.33	Mohd Noor Imran Hadi; Malaysia	10.54
200 m	Suryo Agung Wibowo; Indonesia	20.76	Sittichai Suwonprateep; Thailand	20.84	John Herman Muray; Indonesia	21.01
400 m	Julius Felicisimo Nierras; Philippines	46.56	Jukkatip Pojaroen; Thailand	46.64	Zaiful Zainal Abidin; Malaysia	46.75
800 m	Nguyễn Đình Cương; Vietnam	1:51.16	Midel Dique; Philippines	1:52.72	Mohd Jironi Riduan; Malaysia	1:53.30
1500 m	Nguyễn Đình Cương; Vietnam	3:45.31	Vadivelan Mahendran; Malaysia	3:45.70 NR	Boonthung Srisung; Thailand	3:52.40
5000 m	Boonthung Srisung; Thailand	14:18.03	Julius Sermona; Philippines	14:19.20	Hem Bunting; Cambodia	14:24.71
10,000 m	Boonthung Srisung; Thailand	30:51.66	Julius Sermona; Philippines	31:16.75	Soe Min Thu; Myanmar	31:33.26
110 m hurdles	Rayzam Shah Wan Sofian; Malaysia	13.91	Suphan Wongsriphuck; Thailand	13.95	Muhd Faiz Mohammad; Malaysia	14.00
400 m hurdles	Apisit Kuttiyawan; Thailand	50.38	Zulkarnain Purba; Indonesia	51.29 (NR)	Teeraporn Parkum; Thailand	51.58
3000 m steeplechase	Rene Herrera; Philippines	8:54:21	Patikarn Pechsricha; Thailand	9:02.48	Trần Văn Thắng; Vietnam	9:04.74
4 × 100 m relay	Thailand; Wachara Sondee; Siriroj Darasuriyong; Sompote Suwannarangsri; Sittichai Suwonprateep	38.95	Indonesia; Taufik Rahmadi; Suryo Agung Wibowo; Asrul Akbar; John Herman Muray	39.79	Malaysia; Arif Naim Jeffry; Mohd Noor Imran Hadi; Muhammad Latif Nyat; Mohd Zabidi Ghazali	39.90
4 × 400 m relay	Malaysia; Mohd Zafril Zuslaini; Zaiful Zainal Abidin; Thipan Subramaniam; Amran Raj Krishnan	3:07.95	Thailand; Supachai Phachsay; Apisit Kuttiyawan; Suppachai Chimdee; Jukkatip Pojaroen	3:08.25	Philippines; Junrey Bano; Julius Felicisimo Nierras; Rodrigo Tanuan, Jr. Ernie Candelario	3:08.53
Marathon	Yahuza; Indonesia	2:23.46	Hem Bunting; Cambodia	2:26.28	Eduardo Buenavista; Philippines	2:27.21
20 km walk	Boon Lim Teoh; Malaysia	1:30.37	Kristian Lumban Tobing; Indonesia	1:32.57	Indra; Indonesia	1:35.45
High jump	Lee Hup Wei; Malaysia	2.19 m	Nguyễn Duy Bằng; Vietnam	2.17 m	Ahmad Najwan Aqra; Malaysia	2.15 m
Pole vault	Sompong Saombankuay; Thailand	5.10 m	Amnat Kunpadit; Thailand	4.80 m	Emerson Obiena; Philippines	4.70 m
Long jump	Henry Dagmil; Philippines	7.87 m	Keeratikorn Janmanee; Thailand	7.75 m	Syahrul Amri Suhaimi; Malaysia	7.48 m
Triple jump	Theerayut Philakong; Thailand	16.44 m	Kittisak Sukon; Thailand	16.21 m	Jobert Delicano; Philippines	16.07 m (NR)
Shot put	Chatchawal Polyeng; Thailand	17.43 m	Sarayudh Pinitjit; Thailand	16.99 m	Eliezer Sunang; Philippines	15.62 m
Discus throw	Wansawang Sawasdee; Thailand	54.13 m	Kvanchai Numsomboon; Thailand	53.06 m	Mohd Yazid Yatimi Yusof; Brunei	41.82 m
Hammer throw	Arniel Ferrera; Philippines	60.98 m (NR)	Tantipong Phetchaiya; Thailand	56.47 m	Yongjaros Kanju; Thailand	53.57 m
Javelin throw	Sanya Buathong; Thailand	68.65 m	Danilo Fresnido; Philippines	68.14 m	Nontach Palanupat; Thailand	67.76 m
Decathlon	Vũ Văn Huyện; Vietnam	7457 pts (NR)	Boonkete Chalon; Thailand	6921 pts	Arnold Villarube; Philippines	6713 pts

=== Women ===
Event	Gold		Silver		Bronze	
100 m (Wind: -0.3 m/s)	Vũ Thị Hương; Vietnam	11.47 (=NR)	Nongnuch Sanrat; Thailand	11.56	Irene Truitje Joseph; Indonesia	11.77
200 m	Vũ Thị Hương; Vietnam	23.47	Orranut Klomdee; Thailand	23.74	Kay Khine Lwin; Myanmar	23.85
400 m	Saowalee Kaewchuy; Thailand	54.75	Lai Lai Win; Myanmar	55.11	Kunya Harnthong; Thailand	55.41
800 m	Trương Thanh Hằng; Vietnam	2:02.39 (NR)	Vũ Thị Trang; Vietnam	2:06.71	Myint Myint Aye; Myanmar	2:08.03
1500 m	Trương Thanh Hằng; Vietnam	4:11.60 (NR)	Rini Budiarti; Indonesia	4:19.99	Bùi Thị Hiền; Vietnam	4:32.55
5000 m	Triyaningsih; Indonesia	15:54.32	Rini Budiarti; Indonesia	16:08.00	Phyu War Thet; Myanmar	16:27.10
10,000 m	Triyaningsih; Indonesia	34:07.35	Pa Pa; Myanmar	34:39.98	Mercedita Manipol; Philippines	35:05.57
100 m hurdles (Wind: -0.8 m/s)	Dedeh Erawati; Indonesia	13.51	Moh Siew Wei; Malaysia	13.61	Wallapa Punsoongneun; Thailand	13.85
400 m hurdles	Wassana Winatho; Thailand	57.21	Mary Grace Melgar; Philippines	59.07	Nguyễn Thị Nụ; Vietnam	59.28
4 × 100 m relay	Thailand; Sangwan Jaksunin; Supavadee Khawpueak; Orranut Klomdee; Nongnuch Sanrat	44.00	Vietnam; Mai Thị Phương; Lê Ngọc Phượng; Trường Thị Nguyệt; Đỗ Thị Ly	45.62	Malaysia; Noor Hazwanie Norizan; Siti Fatimah Mohamad; Azizah Ibrahim; Norjannah Hafiszah Jamaluddin	46.38
4 × 400 m relay	Thailand; Kunya Harnthong; Saowalee Kaewchuy; Treewadee Yongphan; Wassana Winatho	3:38.26	Myanmar; Lai Lai Win; Myint Myint Aye; Naw Ka Paw Phaw; Kay Khine Lwin	3:40.60	Vietnam; Đỗ Thị Ly; Nguyễn Thị Nụ; Nguyễn Thị Bắc; Nguyễn Thị Thúy	3:43.90
Marathon	Sunisa Sailomyen; Thailand	2:43.33	Pa Pa; Myanmar	2:44.11	Jho-Ann Banayag; Philippines	2:44.41
20 km walk	Yuan Yufang; Malaysia	1:41.47	Darwati; Indonesia	1:52.13.4	Saw Mar Lar Nwe; Myanmar	1:53.52.6
High jump	Bùi Thị Nhung; Vietnam	1.88 m	Noengrothai Chaipetch; Thailand	1.86 m	Wanida Boonwan; Thailand	1.84 m
Pole vault	Roslinda Samsu; Malaysia	4.00 m	Debbie Samson; Philippines	3.90 m	Ni Putu Desi Margawati; Indonesia	3.80 m
Long jump	Marestella Torres; Philippines	6.31 m	Thitima Muangjan; Thailand	6.25 m	Sin Mei Ngew; Malaysia	6.08 m
Triple jump	Thitima Muangjan; Thailand	13.85 m	Sin Mei Ngew; Malaysia	13.75 m	Đào Thị Hoài Thương; Vietnam	12.39 m
Shot put	Zhang Guirong; Singapore	17.21 m	Juttaporn Krasaeyan; Thailand	16.06 m	Siwaporn Warapiang; Thailand	14.15 m
Discus throw	Dwi Ratnawati; Indonesia	50.05 m	Juttaporn Krasaeyan; Thailand	49.46 m	Zhang Guirong; Singapore	45.73 m
Hammer throw	Siti Shahida Abdullah; Malaysia	52.93 m	Rose Herlinda Inggriana; Indonesia	50.79 m	Yurita Arianny Arsyad; Indonesia	49.99 m
Javelin throw	Buoban Pamang; Thailand	55.97 m	Rosie Villarito; Philippines	50.49 m	Arunya Butsrising; Thailand	39.74 m
Heptathlon	Wassana Winatho; Thailand	5889 pts	Nguyễn Thị Thu Cúc; Vietnam	5259 pts	Narcisa Atienza; Philippines	5093 pts
