= Lin Huijun =

Chinese sprinter (born 1993)

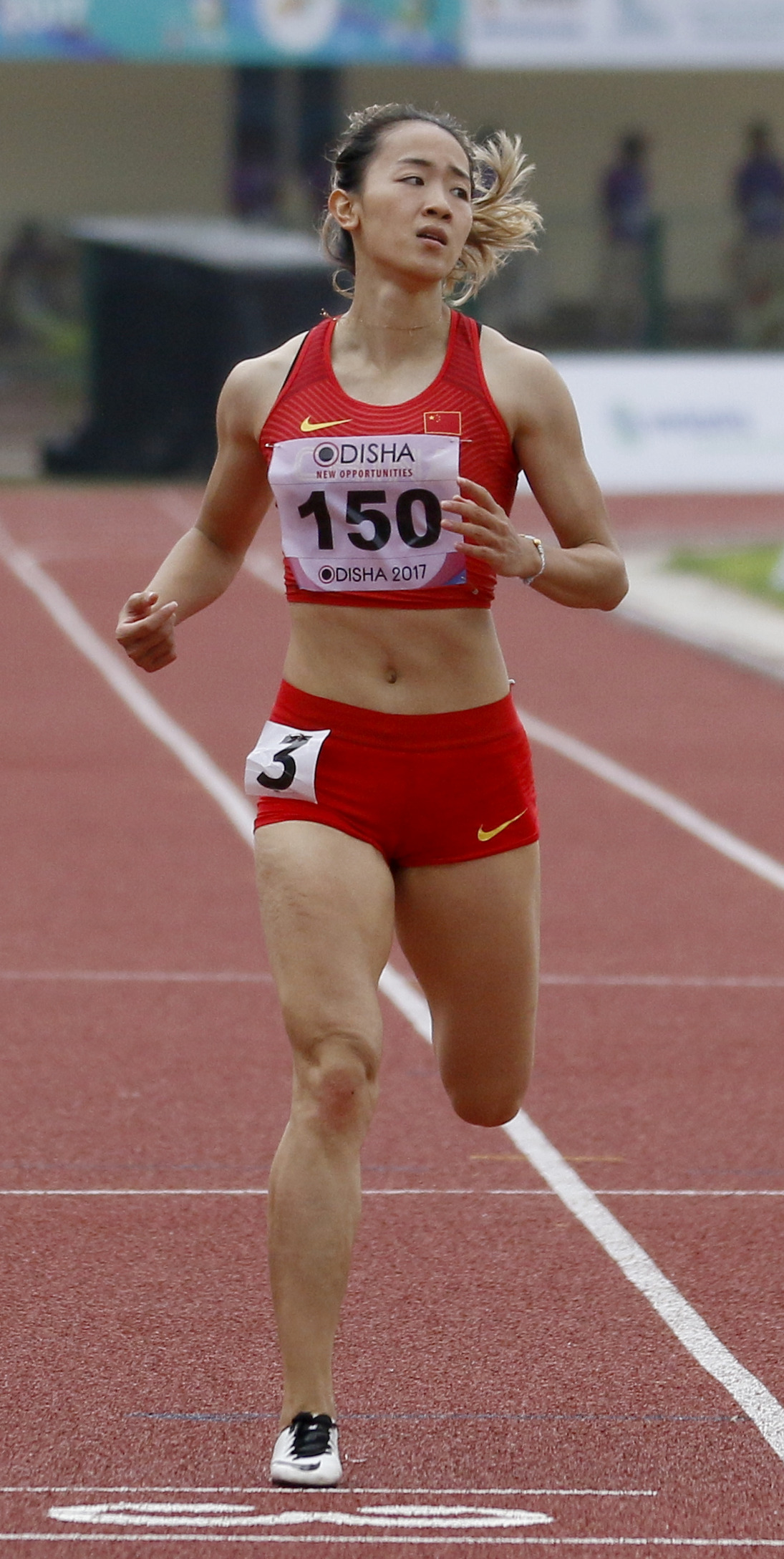
- Lin at the 2017 Asian Championships

Personal information
- Born: 1 February 1993 (age 33) Xianyou County, China
- Education: Beijing Sport University

Sport
- Sport: Athletics
- Events: 100 m, 200 m

Achievements and titles
- Personal bests: 100 m – 11.69 (2013); 200 m – 23.35 (2014)

Lin Huijun (Chinese: 林慧君; born 1 February 1993) is a Chinese sprinter. She finished fourth in the 200 metres at the 2014 Asian Games and 2015 Asian Championships. She won multiple medals as part of the Chinese 4 × 100 metres relay.

== Competition record ==
Year	Competition	Venue	Position	Event	Notes
Representing China
2009	World Youth Championships	Brixen, Italy	11th (sf)	100 m	11.98
2009	World Youth Championships	Brixen, Italy	12th (sf)	200 m	24.48
2012	Asian Junior Championships	Colombo, Sri Lanka	2nd	100 m	11.98
2012	Asian Junior Championships	Colombo, Sri Lanka	1st	200 m	24.69
2013	Asian Championships	Pune, India	11th (sf)	200 m	24.37
2013	Asian Championships	Pune, India	1st	4 × 100 m relay	44.01
2013	East Asian Games	Tianjin, China	1st	4 × 100 m relay	43.66
2014	Asian Indoor Championships	Hangzhou, China	5th	60 m	7.57
2014	IAAF World Relays	Nassau, Bahamas	13th (B)	4 × 100 m relay	44.09
2014	Asian Games	Incheon, South Korea	4th	200 m	23.53
2014	Asian Games	Incheon, South Korea	1st	4 × 100 m relay	42.83
2015	IAAF World Relays	Nassau, Bahamas	12th (B)	4 × 100 m relay	44.28
2015	IAAF World Relays	Nassau, Bahamas	4th	4 × 200 m relay	1:34.89
2015	Asian Championships	Wuhan, China	4th	200 m	23.73
2015	Asian Championships	Wuhan, China	1st	4 × 100 m relay	43.10
2015	Universiade	Gwangju, South Korea	11th (sf)	200 m	24.11
2015	Universiade	Gwangju, South Korea	6th	4 × 100 m relay	46.11
2015	World Championships	Beijing, China	10th (h)	4 × 100 m relay	43.18
2016	Asian Indoor Championships	Doha, Qatar	12th (sf)	60 m	7.67
2017	Asian Championships	Bhubaneswar, India	8th	200 m	24.10
2017	Asian Championships	Bhubaneswar, India	2nd	4 × 100 m relay	44.50
