= 2015 Asian Athletics Championships – Women's 4 × 100 metres relay =

2015 women's 4 x 100 metre competition

The women's 4 × 100 metres event at the 2015 Asian Athletics Championships was held on June 4.

== Results ==
Rank	Lane	Nation	Competitors	Time	Notes
1st place, gold medalist(s)	6	China	Tao Yujia, Yuan Qiqi, Lin Huijun, Wei Yongli	43.10	CR
2nd place, silver medalist(s)	3	Japan	Saori Kitakaze, Anna Doi, Chisato Fukushima, Kana Ichikawa	44.14	
3rd place, bronze medalist(s)	5	Thailand	Supawan Thipat, Khanrutai Pakdee, Phatsorn Jaksuninkorn, Tassaporn Wannakit	44.73	
4	4	India	Sini Sahadevan, Mg Padmini, Srabani Nanda, Dutee Chand	45.72	
	2	Kazakhstan	Svetlana Ivanchukova, Viktoriya Zyabkina, Anastassiya Tulapina, Olga Safronova	DQ	
