= 2011 Asian Athletics Championships – Women's 4 × 100 metres relay =

The women's 4 × 100 metres relay at the 2011 Asian Athletics Championships was held at the Kobe Universiade Memorial Stadium on 10 July.

== Results ==
Rank	Lane	Team	Name	Time	Notes
1st place, gold medalist(s)	3	Japan	Nao Okabe, Momoko Takahashi, Chisato Fukushima, Saori Imai	44.05	
2nd place, silver medalist(s)	6	China	Tao Yujia, Liang Qiuping, Jiang Lan, Wei Yongli	44.23	
3rd place, bronze medalist(s)	4	Thailand	Phatsorn Jaksuninkorn, Neeranuch Klomdee, Laphassaporn Tawoncharoen, Nongnuch Sanrat	44.62	
4	5	Hong Kong	Chan Ho Yee, Leung Hau Sze, Fong Yee Pui, Poon Pak Yan	44.62	
