= Suryo Agung Wibowo =

Indonesian sprinter

Personal information
- Born: 8 October 1983 (age 42) Solo, Jawa Tengah, Indonesia
- Height: 1.70 m (5 ft 7 in)
- Weight: 64 kg (141 lb)

Sport
- Country: Indonesia
- Sport: Athletics
- Event: 100 metres
Medal record
Men's athletics
Representing Indonesia
SEA Games
Gold medal – first place	2007 Nakhon Ratchasima	100 m
Gold medal – first place	2007 Nakhon Ratchasima	200 m
Gold medal – first place	2009 Vientiane	100 m
Gold medal – first place	2009 Vientiane	200 m
Silver medal – second place	2007 Nakhon Ratchasima	4x100 m relay
Bronze medal – third place	2003 Hanoi	4x100 m relay
Bronze medal – third place	2005 Manila	100 m
Bronze medal – third place	2009 Vientiane	4x100 m relay
Asian Junior Championships
Silver medal – second place	2002 Bangkok	100 m

Suryo Agung Wibowo (born 8 October 1983) is an Indonesian sprinter who specializes in the 100 metres. Dubbed the "fastest man of Southeast Asia" in his prime, he set a SEA Games record of 10.17 seconds in 2009 that would not be broken for another 16 years.

Suryo competed at the 2003 World Indoor Championships, the 2003 World Championships and the 2008 Olympic Games without progressing to the second round. In Beijing he placed 6th in his heat in a time of 10.46 seconds.

== Other achievements ==
Year	Competition	Venue	Position	Event	Notes
Representing Indonesia
2010	Oceania Championships	Cairns, Australia	1st (guest)	100 m	10.52 s (wind: -0.5 m/s)
