= Soe Min Thu =

Burmese long-distance runner

Personal information
- Nationality: Myanmar
- Born: 25 September 1988 (age 37)
- Height: 1.70 m (5 ft 7 in)
- Weight: 55 kg (121 lb)

Sport
- Sport: Athletics
- Event: Long-distance running

Achievements and titles
- Personal bests: 5000 m: 15:16.23 (2007); 10,000 m: 31:33.26 (2007)
Medal record
Men's athletics
Representing Myanmar
Southeast Asian Games
Bronze medal – third place	2007 Bangkok	10,000 m

Soe Min Thu (born September 25, 1988) is a Burmese long-distance runner. He won a bronze medal for the men's 10,000 metres at the 2007 Southeast Asian Games in Bangkok, Thailand, setting his personal best time of 31:33.26.

Soe Min Thu represented Myanmar at the 2008 Summer Olympics in Beijing, where he competed for the men's 5,000 metres. He ran in the first heat against thirteen other athletes, including Kenya's Eliud Kipchoge, who later won the silver medal in the final. He finished the race in last place by one minute and thirty seconds behind Japan's Takayuki Matsumiya, with a time of 15:50.56. However, Soe Min Thu failed to advance into the final, as he placed thirty-ninth overall, and was ranked farther below four mandatory slots for the next round.
