= 2007 Asian Athletics Championships – Women's 4 × 100 metres relay =

The women's 4 × 100 metres relay event at the 2007 Asian Athletics Championships was held in Amman, Jordan on July 29.

== Results ==
Rank	Team	Name	Time	Notes
1st place, gold medalist(s)	Thailand	Sangwan Jaksunin, Supavadee Khawpeag, Jutamass Tawoncharoen, Nongnuch Sanrat	44.31	
2nd place, silver medalist(s)	Japan	Tomoko Ishida, Momoko Takahashi, Sakie Nobuoka, Saori Kitakaze	45.06	
3rd place, bronze medalist(s)	Chinese Taipei	Lin Wen-Wen, Lin Yi-chun, Chen Shu-Chuan, Li Chen Yi Ru	46.48	
4	Hong Kong	Wan Kin Yee, Tang Uen Shan, Philippa Armentrout, Chan Ho Yee	46.75	
5	Singapore	Balpreet Kaur Purba, Choo Sze-Min Amanda, Ann Siao Mei, Lee Yan Lin	47.78	
	Jordan		DNS	
