= Kana Ichikawa =

Japanese sprinter (born 1991)

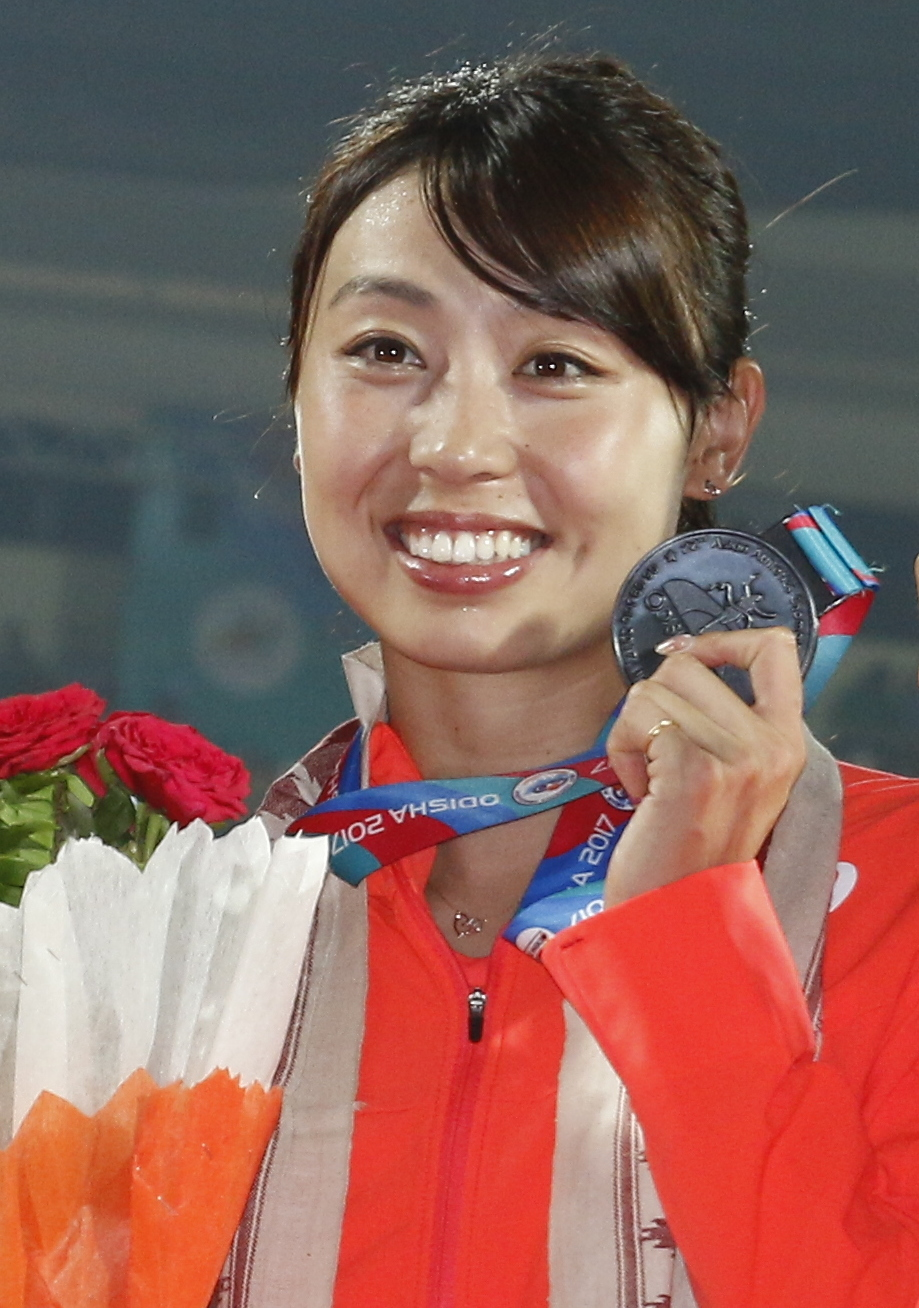
- Kana Ichikawa in 2017

Personal information
- Born: 14 January 1991 (age 35) Toyota, Aichi, Japan
- Height: 1.64 m (5 ft 5 in)
- Weight: 49 kg (108 lb)

Sport
- Sport: Athletics
- Event(s): 200 metres, 400 metres

Kana Ichikawa (市川 華菜, Ichikawa Kana; born 14 January 1991 in Toyota, Aichi) is a Japanese sprinter.

She competed for the Japanese team in the 4 × 100 metres relay at the 2012 Summer Olympics; the team placed 15th with a time of 44.25 in Round 1 and did not qualify for the final.

== International competitions ==
Year	Competition	Venue	Position	Event	Notes
Representing Japan
2010	World Junior Championships	Moncton, Canada	8th	200 m	24.09
2010	World Junior Championships	Moncton, Canada	13th (h)	4 × 100 m relay	45.78
2010	World Junior Championships	Moncton, Canada	14th (h)	4 × 400 m relay	3:50.65
2011	Asian Championships	Kobe, Japan	5th (h)	100 m	11.76^{1}
2011	Universiade	Shenzhen, China	19th (qf)	100 m	12.00
2012	Olympic Games	London, United Kingdom	15th (h)	4 × 100 m relay	44.25
2013	East Asian Games	Tianjin, China	2nd	4 × 100 m relay	45.17
2014	IAAF World Relays	Nassau, Bahamas	18th (h)	4 × 100 m relay	44.66
2014	Asian Games	Incheon, South Korea	3rd	4 × 100 m relay	44.05
2014	Asian Games	Incheon, South Korea	2nd	4 × 400 m relay	3:30.80
2015	IAAF World Relays	Nassau, Bahamas	–	4 × 100 m relay	DQ
2015	IAAF World Relays	Nassau, Bahamas	2nd (B)	4 × 400 m relay	3:34.65
2015	Asian Championships	Wuhan, China	5th	200 m	23.74
2015	Asian Championships	Wuhan, China	2nd	4 × 100 m relay	44.14
2015	World Championships	Beijing, China	13th (h)	4 × 400 m relay	3:28.91
2017	Asian Championships	Bhubaneswar, India	6th	200 m	23.68
2017	Asian Championships	Bhubaneswar, India	2nd	4 × 400 m relay	3:37.74
2018	Asian Games	Jakarta, Indonesia	15th (sf)	100 m	12.01
2018	Asian Games	Jakarta, Indonesia	5th	4 × 100 m relay	44.93

^{1}Did not start in the final

== Personal bests ==
Outdoor

- 100 metres – 11.43 (+2.0 m/s, Hiroshima 2011)
- 200 metres – 23.39 (-0.2 m/s, Osaka 2017)
- 400 metres – 54.14 (Nagasaki 2014)
