= Nongnuch Sanrat =

Thai sprinter

Medal record

Women's athletics

Representing Thailand

Asian Championships
Gold medal – first place	2003 Manila	4 × 100 m
Gold medal – first place	2005 Incheon	4 × 100 m
Gold medal – first place	2007 Amman	4 × 100 m

Asian Indoor Championships
Gold medal – first place	2006 Pattaya	60 m
Bronze medal – third place	2008 Doha	60 m

Nongnuch Sanrat (Thai: นงนุช แสนราช; born August 26, 1983, in Bangkok) is a Thai sprinter.

Sanrat represented Thailand at the 2008 Summer Olympics in Beijing. She competed at the 4 × 100 metres relay together with Orranut Klomdee, Jutamass Thavoncharoen and Sangwan Jaksunin. In their first round heat they placed fifth in a time of 44.38 seconds was the eleventh time overall out of sixteen participating nations. With this result they failed to qualify for the final.

== Achievements ==
Year	Competition	Venue	Position	Event	Notes
Representing Thailand
2003	Asian Championships	Manila, Philippines	1st	4 × 100 m relay	44.25
2003	Southeast Asian Games	Hanoi, Vietnam	1st	4 × 100 m relay	44.82
2005	Universiade	İzmir, Turkey	7th	100 m	11.79
2005	Asian Championships	Incheon, South Korea	4th	100 m	11.82
2005	Asian Championships	Incheon, South Korea	1st	4 × 100 m relay	44.18
2005	Asian Indoor Games	Bangkok, Thailand	1st	60 m	7.46
2005	Southeast Asian Games	Manila, Philippines	2nd	100 m	11.63
2005	Southeast Asian Games	Manila, Philippines	1st	4 × 100 m relay	44.30
2006	Asian Indoor Championships	Pattaya, Thailand	1st	60 m	7.48
2006	Asian Games	Doha, Qatar	12th (h)	100 m	12.16
2007	Asian Indoor Games	Macau	1st	60 m	7.28
2007	Asian Championships	Amman, Jordan	1st	4 × 100 m relay	44.31
2007	Universiade	Bangkok, Thailand	19th (qf)	100 m	11.98
2007	Universiade	Bangkok, Thailand	2nd	4 × 100 m relay	43.92
2007	Southeast Asian Games	Nakhon Ratchasima, Thailand	2nd	100 m	11.56
2007	Southeast Asian Games	Nakhon Ratchasima, Thailand	1st	4 × 100 m relay	44.00
2008	Asian Indoor Championships	Doha, Qatar	3rd	60 m	7.49
2008	Olympic Games	Beijing, China	11th (h)	4 × 100 m relay	44.38
2009	Universiade	Belgrade, Serbia	14th (sf)	100 m	11.83
2009	Universiade	Belgrade, Serbia	4th	4 × 100 m relay	44.47
2009	Asian Championships	Guangzhou, China	2nd	4 × 100 m relay	44.55
2009	Asian Indoor Games	Hanoi, Vietnam	3rd	60 m	7.42
2009	Southeast Asian Games	Vientiane, Laos	1st	4 × 100 m relay	44.54
2010	Asian Games	Guangzhou, China	9th (sf)	100 m	11.80
2010	Asian Games	Guangzhou, China	1st	4 × 100 m relay	44.09
2011	Asian Championships	Kobe, Japan	5th	100 m	11.80
2011	Asian Championships	Kobe, Japan	3rd	4 × 100 m relay	44.62
2011	Universiade	Shenzhen, China	19th (qf)	100 m	12.00
2011	Universiade	Shenzhen, China	5th	4 × 100 m relay	44.13
2011	Southeast Asian Games	Palembang, Indonesia	2nd	100 m	11.69
2013	Southeast Asian Games	Naypyidaw, Myanmar	1st	4 × 100 m relay	44.42
2014	Asian Games	Incheon, South Korea	4th	4 × 100 m relay	44.39
