= Saori Imai =

Japanese sprinter (born 1990)

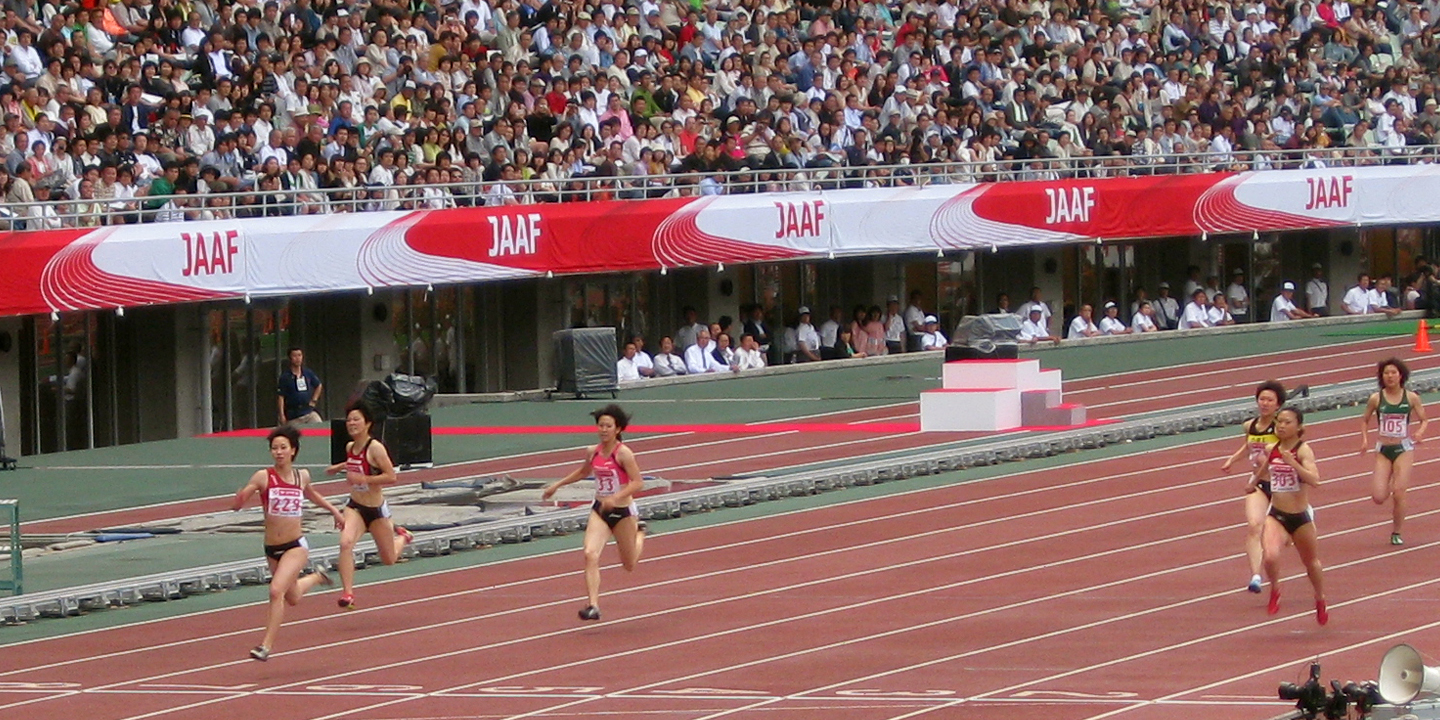
- Imai (third from left) at the 2012 Japan Championships

Personal information
- Nationality: Japanese
- Born: 22 August 1990 (age 35) Tatsuno, Nagano, Japan
- Education: Shigakkan University
- Height: 1.64 m (5 ft 5 in)
- Weight: 61 kg (134 lb)

Sport
- Country: Japan
- Sport: Track and field
- Event(s): 100 metres 200 metres
- Retired: 2018

Achievements and titles
- Personal best(s): 100 m: 11.64 (2010); 200 m: 23.68 (2010)
Medal record
Women's athletics
Representing Japan
Asian Championships
Gold medal – first place	2011 Kobe	4×100 m relay
Bronze medal – third place	2011 Kobe	200 m

Saori Imai (今井 沙緒里, Imai Saori; born 22 August 1990 in Tatsuno, Nagano) is a Japanese retired track and field sprinter who specialized in the 200 metres. She competed in the 4 × 100 metres relay at the 2011 World Championships. She also won a bronze medal at the 2011 Asian Championships in the 200 metres and a gold medal in the 4 × 100 metres relay.

== Personal bests ==
Event	Time (s)	Competition	Venue	Date
100 m	11.64 (wind: +1.8 m/s)	Tokai Region Championships	Matsumoto, Japan	29 August 2010
200 m	23.68 (wind: +0.7 m/s)	Tokai Region Championships	Matsumoto, Japan	28 August 2010

== International competition ==
Year	Competition	Venue	Position	Event	Time (s)
Representing Japan
2011	Asian Championships	Kobe, Japan	3rd	200 m	24.06 (wind: -2.2 m/s)
2011	Asian Championships	Kobe, Japan	1st	4×100 m relay	44.05 (relay leg: 4th)
2011	World Championships	Daegu, South Korea	10th (h)	4×100 m relay	43.83 (relay leg: 4th)
2017	DécaNation	Angers, France	4th	200 m	24.60 (wind: +0.1 m/s)

== National titles ==
Year	Competition	Venue	Event	Time (s)
Representing Shigakukan High School
2008	National High School Championships	Kumagaya, Saitama	200 m	24.35
2008	National Junior Championships	Tottori, Tottori	200 m	24.14 (wind: +0.4 m/s)
Representing Shigakkan University
2009	National University Championships	Shinjuku, Tokyo	200 m	24.06 (wind: -0.1 m/s)
2009	National Junior Championships	Kōfu, Yamanashi	200 m	24.00 (wind: +0.8 m/s)
2010	National University Championships	Shinjuku, Tokyo	4×100 m relay	45.45 (relay leg: 4th)
2011	National University Individual Championships	Hiratsuka, kanagawa	100 m	11.80 (wind: +0.9 m/s)
2011	National University Individual Championships	Hiratsuka, kanagawa	200 m	23.77 (wind: +1.5 m/s)
2011	National University Championships	Kumamoto, Kumamoto	100 m	11.73 (wind: +2.6 m/s)
2011	National University Championships	Kumamoto, Kumamoto	4×100 m relay	45.84 (relay leg: 4th)
