= 2002 Asian Athletics Championships – Women's 4 × 100 metres relay =

The women's 4 × 100 metres relay event at the 2002 Asian Athletics Championships was held in Colombo, Sri Lanka on 10 August.

== Results ==
Rank	Nation	Athletes	Time	Notes
1st place, gold medalist(s)	China	Ni Xiaoli, Yan Jiankui, Huang Mei, Qin Wangping	43.94	
2nd place, silver medalist(s)	Uzbekistan	Guzel Khubbieva, Anza Kazakova, Ludmila Dmitriadi, Lyubov Perepelova	44.85	
3rd place, bronze medalist(s)	Thailand	Trecia Roberts, Oramoch Klomdee, Supawadee Khawpeag, Juthamass Thawonchavoen	44.89	
4	Sri Lanka		45.05	
5	Japan		45.74	
