= Yuka Sato (sprinter) =

Japanese sprinter

Personal information
- Nationality: Japanese
- Born: 6 July 1981 (age 45) Aomori, Japan
- Education: National Institute of Fitness and Sports in Kanoya
- Height: 1.68 m (5 ft 6 in)
- Weight: 55 kg (121 lb)

Sport
- Country: Japan
- Sport: Track and field
- Events: 100 metres Long jump Triple jump

Achievements and titles
- Personal bests: 100 m: 11.67 s (2005) Long jump: 6.44 m (2004) Triple jump: 13.39 m (2004)
Medal record
Women's athletics
Representing Japan
Asian Championships
| Bronze medal – third place | 2005 Incheon | 4×100 m relay |

Yuka Sato (佐藤 友香, Satō Yūka; born 6 July 1981 in Aomori) is a Japanese former track and field athlete and currently a professional keirin cyclist. She competed in the 4 × 100 meters relay at the 2005 World Athletics Championships.

== Personal bests ==
| Event | Performance | Competition | Venue | Date |
|---|---|---|---|---|
| 100 m | 11.67 s (wind: +1.0 m/s) | National Corporate Championships | Marugame, Japan | 25 September 2005 |
| Long jump | 6.44 m (wind: -0.7 m/s) | Super Track and Field Meet | Yokohama, Japan | 23 September 2004 |
| Triple jump | 13.39 m (wind: -0.8 m/s) | National Sports Festival | Kumagaya, Japan | 27 October 2004 |

== International competition ==
| Year | Competition | Venue | Position | Event | Performance | Notes |
Representing Japan
| 2005 | World Championships | Helsinki, Finland | 14th (h) | 4×100 m relay | 44.52 s (relay leg: 3rd) | SB |
| 2005 | Asian Championships | Incheon, South Korea | 6th | 100 m | 11.89 s (wind: +0.3 m/s) | |
| 2005 | Asian Championships | Incheon, South Korea | 3rd | 4×100 m relay | 44.85 s (relay leg: 3rd) | |
| 2006 | Asian Indoor Championships | Pattaya, Thailand | 4th | Long jump | 5.91 m | PB |
