= Phatsorn Jaksuninkorn =

Thai sprinter (born 1984)

Medal record

Women's athletics

Representing Thailand

Asian Championships
Gold medal – first place	2003 Manila	4×100 m
Gold medal – first place	2005 Incheon	4×100 m
Gold medal – first place	2007 Amman	4×100 m

Asian Indoor Championships
Silver medal – second place	2006 Pattaya	60 m

Phatsorn Jaksuninkorn (Thai: ภัสสร จักษุนิลกร, formerly Sangwan Jaksunin; born 10 December 1984 in Bangkok) is a track and field sprint athlete who competes internationally for Thailand.

Jaksunin represented Thailand at the 2008 Summer Olympics in Beijing. She competed at the 4 × 100 metres relay together with Orranut Klomdee, Jutamass Thavoncharoen and Nongnuch Sanrat. In their first round heat they placed fifth in a time of 44.38 seconds was the eleventh time overall out of sixteen participating nations. With this result they failed to qualify for the final.

== Achievements ==
Year	Competition	Venue	Position	Event	Notes
Representing Thailand
2003	Asian Championships	Manila, Philippines	1st	4 × 100 m relay	44.25
2005	Asian Championships	Incheon, South Korea	1st	4 × 100 m relay	44.18
2005	Asian Indoor Games	Bangkok, Thailand	2nd	60 m	7.49
2005	Southeast Asian Games	Manila, Philippines	1st	4 × 100 m relay	44.30
2006	Asian Indoor Championships	Pattaya, Thailand	2nd	60 m	7.54
2007	Asian Indoor Games	Macau	2nd	60 m	7.49
2007	Asian Championships	Amman, Jordan	1st	4 × 100 m relay	44.31
2007	Universiade	Bangkok, Thailand	2nd	4 × 100 m relay	43.92
2007	Southeast Asian Games	Nakhon Ratchasima, Thailand	1st	4 × 100 m relay	44.00
2008	Asian Indoor Championships	Doha, Qatar	4th	60 m	7.64
2008	Olympic Games	Beijing, China	11th (h)	4 × 100 m relay	44.38
2009	Universiade	Belgrade, Serbia	14th (h)	100 m	11.83
2009	Universiade	Belgrade, Serbia	4th	4 × 100 m relay	44.47
2009	World Championships	Berlin, Germany	15th (h)	4 × 100 m relay	44.59
2009	Asian Championships	Guangzhou, China	2nd	4 × 100 m relay	44.55
2009	Southeast Asian Games	Vientiane, Laos	1st	4 × 100 m relay	44.54
2010	Asian Games	Guangzhou, China	1st	4 × 100 m relay	44.09
2011	Asian Championships	Kobe, Japan	3rd	4 × 100 m relay	44.62
2011	Universiade	Shenzhen, China	5th	4 × 100 m relay	44.13
2013	Asian Championships	Pune, India	3rd	4 × 100 m relay	44.44
2014	Asian Games	Incheon, South Korea	4th	4 × 100 m relay	44.39
2015	Southeast Asian Games	Singapore	1st	4 × 100 m relay	44.27
2015	Asian Championships	Wuhan, China	3rd	4 × 100 m relay	44.73
