= Lai Lai Win =

Burmese sprinter

Personal information
- Nationality: Myanmar
- Born: 9 February 1977 (age 49) Natmauk, Myanmar
- Height: 1.60 m (5 ft 3 in)
- Weight: 50 kg (110 lb)

Sport
- Sport: Athletics
- Event: Sprint

Achievements and titles
- Personal best: 200 m: 23.78 s (2005)
Medal record
Women's athletics
Representing Myanmar
Southeast Asian Games
Silver medal – second place	2007 Bangkok	400 m

Lai Lai Win (born 9 February 1977) is a Burmese sprinter. She won a silver medal for the women's 400 metres at the 2007 Southeast Asian Games in Bangkok, Thailand, with a time of 55.11 seconds.

Win represented Myanmar at the 2008 Summer Olympics in Beijing, where she competed for the women's 200 metres. She ran in the fourth heat against seven other athletes, including Bahrain's Roqaya Al-Gassra, and Jamaica's Kerron Stewart, both of whom were heavy favorites in this event. She finished the race in last place by three quarters of a second (0.75) behind Barbados' Jade Bailey, with a time of 24.37 seconds. Win, however, failed to advance into the quarterfinals, as she placed forty-third overall, and was ranked below four mandatory slots for the next round.
