= Laphassaporn Tawoncharoen =

Thai sprinter (born 1981)

Medal record

Women's athletics

Representing Thailand

Asian Championships
| Gold medal – first place | 2003 Manila | 4×100 m |
| Gold medal – first place | 2005 Incheon | 4×100 m |
| Gold medal – first place | 2007 Amman | 4×100 m |

Asian Indoor Championships
| Bronze medal – third place | 2008 Doha | 4×400 m |

Laphassaporn Tawoncharoen (formerly Jutamass Thavoncharoen, born 21 December 1981 in Bangkok) is a track and field sprint athlete who competes internationally for Thailand.

== Biography ==
Thavoncharoen represented Thailand at the 2008 Summer Olympics in Beijing. She competed at the 100 metres sprint and placed sixth in her heat without advancing to the second round. She ran the distance in a time of 11.82 seconds. Together with Sangwan Jaksunin, Orranut Klomdee and Nongnuch Sanrat she also took part in the 4 × 100 metres relay. In their first round heat they placed fifth in a time of 44.38 seconds was the eleventh time overall out of sixteen participating nations. With this result they failed to qualify for the final.

== Achievements ==
| Year | Competition | Venue | Position | Event | Notes |
Representing Thailand
| 2003 | Asian Championships | Manila, Philippines | 7th (sf) | 100 m | 11.85 |
| 2003 | Asian Championships | Manila, Philippines | 1st | 4 × 100 m relay | 44.25 |
| 2003 | Southeast Asian Games | Hanoi, Vietnam | 2nd | 100 m | 11.55 |
| 2003 | Southeast Asian Games | Hanoi, Vietnam | 2nd | 200 m | 23.49 |
| 2003 | Southeast Asian Games | Hanoi, Vietnam | 1st | 4 × 100 m relay | 44.82 |
| 2005 | Asian Championships | Incheon, South Korea | 1st | 4 × 100 m relay | 44.18 |
| 2005 | Southeast Asian Games | Manila, Philippines | 3rd | 200 m | 23.97 |
| 2005 | Southeast Asian Games | Manila, Philippines | 1st | 4 × 100 m relay | 44.30 |
| 2007 | Asian Championships | Amman, Jordan | 1st | 4 × 100 m relay | 44.31 |
| 2007 | Universiade | Bangkok, Thailand | 6th | 200 m | 23.88 |
| 2007 | Universiade | Bangkok, Thailand | 2nd | 4 × 100 m relay | 43.92 |
| 2007 | Asian Indoor Games | Macau | 2nd | 4 × 400 m relay | 3:38.25 |
| 2008 | Asian Indoor Championships | Doha, Qatar | 3rd | 4 × 400 m relay | 3:43.22 |
| 2008 | Olympic Games | Beijing, China | 49th (h) | 100 m | 11.82 |
| 2008 | Olympic Games | Beijing, China | 11th (h) | 4 × 100 m relay | 44.38 |
| 2009 | Universiade | Belgrade, Serbia | 4th | 4 × 100 m relay | 44.47 |
| 2009 | World Championships | Berlin, Germany | 15th (h) | 4 × 100 m relay | 44.59 |
| 2009 | Asian Championships | Guangzhou, China | 2nd | 4 × 100 m relay | 44.55 |
| 2009 | Southeast Asian Games | Vientiane, Laos | 3rd | 100 m | 11.74 |
| 2009 | Southeast Asian Games | Vientiane, Laos | 5th | 200 m | 24.15 |
| 2009 | Southeast Asian Games | Vientiane, Laos | 1st | 4 × 100 m relay | 44.54 |
| 2010 | Asian Games | Guangzhou, China | 1st | 4 × 100 m relay | 44.09 |
| 2011 | Asian Championships | Kobe, Japan | 3rd | 4 × 100 m relay | 44.62 |
| 2011 | Southeast Asian Games | Palembang, Indonesia | 1st | 200 m | 23.65 |
| 2011 | Southeast Asian Games | Palembang, Indonesia | 1st | 4 × 100 m relay | 44.40 |
| 2011 | Southeast Asian Games | Palembang, Indonesia | 1st | 4 × 400 m relay | 3:41.35 |
