= 2005 Asian Athletics Championships =

2005 Asian Championships
- Dates: September 1–4
- Host city: Incheon, South Korea
- Venue: Munhak Stadium
- Events: 43
- Participation: 536 athletes from 35 nations

The 2005 Asian Athletics Championships were the 16th edition of the international athletics competition between Asian nations. It was held in Incheon, South Korea between 1–4 September 2005.

== Results ==
=== Men ===
Event	Gold		Silver		Bronze	
100 metres	Yahya Al-Gahes; Saudi Arabia	10.39	Shingo Suetsugu; Japan	10.42	Khalid Yousef Al-Obaidli; Qatar	10.45
200 metres	Hamed Hamdan Al-Bishi; Saudi Arabia	20.66	Tatsuro Yoshino; Japan	20.68	Yang Yaozu; China	20.85
400 metres	Yuzo Kanemaru; Japan	46.04	Prasanna Sampath Amarasekera; Sri Lanka	46.48	Rohan Pradeep Kumara; Sri Lanka	46.52
800 metres	Majed Saeed Sultan; Qatar	1:44.27	Abdulrahman Sulaiman; Qatar	1:44.73	Sajjad Moradi; Iran	1:44.74
1500 metres	Ali Abu Bakr Kamal; Qatar	3:44.24	Adnan Taess; Iraq	3:44.57	Nasser Shams Karim; Qatar	3:46.09
5000 metres	James Kwalia; Qatar	14:08.56	Daham Najim Bashir; Qatar	14:15.92	Wu Wen-chien; Chinese Taipei	14:32.43
10,000 metres	Essa Ismail Rashid; Qatar	29:03.60	Moukheld Al-Outaibi; Saudi Arabia	29:04.85	Ali Saadoun Al-Dawoodi; Qatar	29:05.93
3000 metres steeplechase	Musa Amer Obaid; Qatar	8:33.62	Mustafa Ahmed Shebto; Qatar	8:40.86	Wu Wen-chien; Chinese Taipei	8:42.96
110 metres hurdles	Liu Xiang; China	13.30	Shi Dongpeng; China	13.44	Rouhollah Askari; Iran	13.89
400 metres hurdles	Hadi Soua'an Al-Somaily; Saudi Arabia	49.16	Yevgeniy Meleshenko; Kazakhstan	49.18	Zhang Shibao; China	49.65
20 kilometres walk	Lu Ronghua; China	1:25:30	Kim Hyun-sub; South Korea	1:25:41	Zhang Hong; China	1:27:14
4 × 100 metres relay	Japan; Kazuyoshi Hidaka; Tatsuro Yoshino; Yusuke Omae; Shingo Suetsugu	39.10	Thailand; Seksan Wongsala; Wachara Sondee; Ekkachai Janthana; Sittichai Suwonprateep	39.23	Saudi Arabia; Farag Al-Dosari; Mubarak Ata Mubarak; Yahya Al-Ghahes; Hamed Al-Bishi; Bader Al-Ainain	39.25
4 × 400 metres relay	Japan; Yuki Yamaguchi; Yuzo Kanemaru; Hideo Togashi; Mitsuhiro Sato	3:03.51	Sri Lanka; Rohan Pradeep Kumara; Rohitha Pushpakumara; Manura Kuranage Perera; Prasanna Amarasekara	3:04.12	India; Anil Kumar Rohil; Bhupinder Singh; Satbir Singh; Patlavath Shankar; Aboo Backer	3:07.45
High jump	Manjula Kumara Wijesekara; Sri Lanka	2.27 NR	Naoyuki Daigo; Japan	2.23	Zhang Shufeng; China	2.23
Pole vault	Daichi Sawano; Japan	5.40	Zhang Hongwei; China	5.20	Takehito Ariki; Japan	5.20
Long jump	Ahmed Fayaz Marzouk; Saudi Arabia	7.98	Oh Sang-won; South Korea	7.87	Zhou Can; China	7.83
Triple jump	Gu Junjie; China	16.90w	Kazuyoshi Ishikawa; Japan	16.88	Kim Deok-hyeon; South Korea	16.78
Shot put	Khalid Habash Al-Suwaidi; Qatar	19.45	Navpreet Singh; India	19.40	Zhang Qi; China	19.02
Discus throw	Ehsan Haddadi; Iran	65.25 AR	Vikas Gowda; India	62.84	Abbas Samimi; Iran	59.08^{[nb]}
Hammer throw	Ali Al-Zinkawi; Kuwait	71.74	Dilshod Nazarov; Tajikistan	71.38	Hiroaki Doi; Japan	68.50
Javelin throw	Li Rongxiang; China	78.28	Jung Sang-jin; South Korea	76.85	Jagdish Kumar Bishnoi; India	74.83
Decathlon	Pavel Andreev; Uzbekistan	7744 pts	Kim Kun-woo; South Korea	7694 pts	Hiromasa Tanaka; Japan	7351 pts

- ^{nb} The original bronze medalist, Anil Kumar, was disqualified for doping.

=== Women ===
Event	Gold		Silver		Bronze	
100 metres	Qin Wangping; China	11.47	Guzel Khubbieva; Uzbekistan	11.56	Liang Yi; China	11.62
200 metres	Damayanthi Dharsha; Sri Lanka	23.21	Guzel Khubbieva; Uzbekistan	23.43	Ni Xiaoli; China	23.58
400 metres	Manjeet Kaur; India	51.50	Satti Geetha; India	51.75	Asami Tanno; Japan	52.91
800 metres	Miho Sugimori; Japan	2:01.84	Santhi Soundarajan; India	2:04.01	Zamira Amirova; Uzbekistan	2:04.22
1500 metres	Miho Sugimori; Japan	4:12.69	Svetlana Lukasheva; Kazakhstan	4:13.83	Yuriko Kobayashi; Japan	4:14.15
5000 metres	Bai Xue; China	15:40.89	Lee Eun-Jung; South Korea	15:41.67	Yumi Sato; Japan	15:47.14
10,000 metres	Bai Xue; China	33:34.74	Yumi Sato; Japan	33:42.11	Ham Bong-Sil; North Korea	34:35.30
100 metres hurdles	Su Yiping; China	13.30	Lee Yeon-Kyoung; South Korea	13.38	Kumiko Ikeda; Japan	13.54
400 metres hurdles	Huang Xiaoxiao; China	55.63	Noraseela Khalid; Malaysia	56.39	Makiko Yoshida; Japan	56.85
20 kilometres walk	He Dan; China	1:34:25	Tang Yinghua; China	1:34:50	Svetlana Tolstaya; Kazakhstan	1:36:39
4 × 100 metres relay	Thailand; Sangwan Jaksunin; Orranut Klomdee; Juthamas Thavoncharoen; Nongnuch Sanrat	44.18	China; Jiang Zhiying; Liang Yi; Ni Xiaoli; Qin Wangping	44.24	Japan; Tomoko Ota; Sakie Nobuoka; Yuka Sato; Rina Fujimaki	44.85
4 × 400 metres relay	India; Rajwinder Kaur; Sathi Geetha; Chitra K. Soman; Manjeet Kaur	3:30.93	Kazakhstan; Natalya Torshina-Alimzhanova; Anna Gavriushenko; Tatyana Roslanova; Olga Tereshkova	3:32.61	Japan; Satomi Kubokura; Asami Tanno; Mayu Kida; Makiko Yoshida	3:33.54
High jump	Tatyana Efimenko; Kyrgyzstan	1.92	Jing Xuezhu; China	1.92	Anna Ustinova; Kazakhstan	1.84
Pole vault	Gao Shuying; China	4.53 CR	Chang Ko-Hsin; Chinese Taipei	4.10 NR=	Roslinda Samsu; Malaysia	4.10
Long jump	Anju Bobby George; India	6.65	Marestella Torres; Philippines	6.63 NR	Kumiko Ikeda; Japan	6.52
Triple jump	Xie Limei; China	14.38	Anastasiya Zhuravlyeva; Uzbekistan	14.14	Huang Qiuyan; China	13.75
Shot put	Li Meiju; China	18.64	Zhang Guirong; Singapore	18.57	Li Ling; China	18.04
Discus throw	Song Aimin; China	65.15 CR	Sun Taifeng; China	59.09	Krishna Poonia; India	57.67
Hammer throw	Zhang Wenxiu; China	70.05	Gu Yuan; China	63.89	Yuka Murofushi; Japan	62.62
Javelin throw	Park Ho-Hyun; South Korea	55.58	Lee Young-Sun; South Korea	55.29	Anne Maheshi De Silva; Sri Lanka	54.86
Heptathlon	Soma Biswas; India	5377 pts	Sushmitha Singha Roy; India	5308 pts	Watcharaporn Masim; Thailand	5279 pts

== Medal table ==
* Host nation (South Korea)

Rank	Nation	Gold	Silver	Bronze	Total
1	China (CHN)	15	7	10	32
2	Japan (JPN)	6	5	12	23
3	Qatar (QAT)	6	3	3	12
4	India (IND)	4	5	3	12
5	Saudi Arabia (KSA)	4	1	1	6
6	Sri Lanka (SRI)	2	2	2	6
7	South Korea (KOR)*	1	7	1	9
8	Uzbekistan (UZB)	1	3	1	5
9	Thailand (THA)	1	1	1	3
10	Iran (IRI)	1	0	3	4
11	Kuwait (KUW)	1	0	0	1
11	Kyrgyzstan (KGZ)	1	0	0	1
13	Kazakhstan (KAZ)	0	3	2	5
14	Chinese Taipei (TPE)	0	1	2	3
15	Malaysia (MAS)	0	1	1	2
16	Iraq (IRQ)	0	1	0	1
16	Philippines (PHI)	0	1	0	1
16	Singapore (SIN)	0	1	0	1
16	Tajikistan (TJK)	0	1	0	1
20	North Korea (PRK)	0	0	1	1
Totals (20 entries)		43	43	43	129

== Participating nations ==
- Afghanistan (2)
- Brunei (2)
- Cambodia (2)
- China (50)
- Chinese Taipei (22)
- Hong Kong (12)
- India (41)
- Indonesia (5)
- Iran (11)
- Iraq (7)
- Japan (69)
- Kazakhstan (33)
- Kuwait (13)
- Kyrgyzstan (7)
- Laos (1)
- Lebanon (4)
- Macau (6)
- Malaysia (16)
- Maldives (1)
- Mongolia (2)
- North Korea (7)
- Oman (6)
- Pakistan (7)
- Philippines (14)
- Qatar (17)
- Saudi Arabia (22)
- Singapore (11)
- South Korea (63)
- Sri Lanka (28)
- Syria (4)
- Tajikistan (3)
- Thailand (26)
- Timor-Leste (2)
- Uzbekistan (9)
- Vietnam (11)

== See also ==
- 2005 in athletics (track and field)
