= Huang Mei =

Chinese sprinter

Medal record

Women's athletics

Representing China

Asian Championships
Gold medal – first place	1998 Fukuoka	4×400 m
Gold medal – first place	2002 Colombo	4×100 m
Silver medal – second place	1998 Fukuoka	200 m

Huang Mei (born 15 January 1975) is a Chinese sprinter who specialized in the 200 metres.

Her personal best time is 23.04 seconds, achieved in July 2001 in Chengdu.

== Achievements ==
Year	Competition	Venue	Position	Event	Notes
Representing China
1994	World Junior Championships	Lisbon, Portugal	9th (sf)	100m	11.60 (wind: +0.8 m/s)
1994	World Junior Championships	Lisbon, Portugal	7th	200m	24.11 w (wind: +2.2 m/s)
1998	Asian Championships	Fukuoka, Japan	2nd	200 m	23.21
2002	Asian Games	Busan, South Korea	1st	4 × 100 m relay	43.84
2002	World Cup	Madrid, Spain	7th	4 × 100 m relay	43.82
