= 2003 Asian Athletics Championships – Women's 4 × 100 metres relay =

The women's 4 × 100 metres relay event at the 2003 Asian Athletics Championships was held in Manila, Philippines on September 23.

== Results ==
Rank	Nation	Athletes	Time	Notes
1st place, gold medalist(s)	Thailand	Nongnuch Sanrat, Sangwan Jaksunin, Jutamass Thavoncharoen, Orranut Klomdee	44.25	=NR
2nd place, silver medalist(s)	Japan		44.56	
3rd place, bronze medalist(s)	China		44.97	
