= Neeranuch Klomdee =

Thai sprinter

Medal record

Women's athletics

Representing Thailand

Asian Championships
Gold medal – first place	2003 Manila	4 × 100 m
Gold medal – first place	2005 Incheon	4 × 100 m

Asian Indoor Championships
Bronze medal – third place	2006 Pattaya	60 m

Neeranuch Klomdee, formerly known as Orranut Klomdee (Thai: อรนุช กล่อมดี; born June 1, 1980 in Bangkok), is a Thai sprinter.

Klomdee represented Thailand at the 2008 Summer Olympics in Beijing. She competed at the 4 × 100 metres relay together with Sangwan Jaksunin, Jutamass Thavoncharoen and Nongnuch Sanrat. In their first round heat they placed fifth in a time of 44.38 seconds and was the eleventh time overall out of sixteen participating nations. With this result they failed to qualify for the final.

== Achievements ==
Year	Competition	Venue	Position	Event	Notes
Representing Thailand
2000	Asian Championships	Jakarta, Indonesia	11th (sf)	100 m	12.00
2000	Asian Championships	Jakarta, Indonesia	4th	4 × 100 m relay	45.14
2000	Olympic Games	Sydney, Australia	19th (h)	4 × 100 m relay	44.51
2002	Asian Championships	Colombo, Sri Lanka	6th	100 m	11.95
2002	Asian Games	Busan, South Korea	5th	100 m	11.57
2002	Asian Games	Busan, South Korea	2nd	4 × 100 m relay	44.25
2003	Asian Championships	Manila, Philippines	5th	100 m	11.65
2003	Asian Championships	Manila, Philippines	1st	4 × 100 m relay	44.25
2003	Universiade	Daegu, South Korea	7th (sf)	100 m	11.86
2003	Southeast Asian Games	Hanoi, Vietnam	1st	100 m	11.51
2003	Southeast Asian Games	Hanoi, Vietnam	3rd	200 m	23.66
2003	Southeast Asian Games	Hanoi, Vietnam	1st	4 × 100 m relay	44.82
2005	Universiade	İzmir, Turkey	12th	100 m	11.95
2005	Asian Championships	Incheon, South Korea	7th	100 m	11.92
2005	Asian Championships	Incheon, South Korea	1st	4 × 100 m relay	44.18
2005	Southeast Asian Games	Manila, Philippines	3rd	100 m	11.66
2005	Southeast Asian Games	Manila, Philippines	1st	4 × 100 m relay	44.30
2006	Asian Indoor Championships	Pattaya, Thailand	3rd	60 m	7.59
2006	Asian Games	Doha, Qatar	9th (h)	100 m	12.16
2007	Universiade	Bangkok, Thailand	25th (qf)	100 m	12.10
2007	Universiade	Bangkok, Thailand	2nd	4 × 100 m relay	43.92
2007	Asian Championships	Amman, Jordan	6th	100 m	11.72
2007	Southeast Asian Games	Nakhon Ratchasima, Thailand	2nd	200 m	23.74
2007	Southeast Asian Games	Nakhon Ratchasima, Thailand	1st	4 × 100 m relay	44.00
2008	Olympic Games	Beijing, China	11th (h)	4 × 100 m relay	44.38
2009	Asian Indoor Games	Hanoi, Vietnam	4th	60 m	7.43
2009	World Championships	Berlin, Germany	15th (h)	4 × 100 m relay	44.59
2010	Asian Games	Guangzhou, China	6th	100 m	11.68
2010	Asian Games	Guangzhou, China	1st	4 × 100 m relay	44.09
2011	Asian Championships	Kobe, Japan	10th (h)	100 m	11.98
2011	Asian Championships	Kobe, Japan	3rd	4 × 100 m relay	44.62
2011	Southeast Asian Games	Palembang, Indonesia	4th	100 m	11.84
2013	Asian Championships	Pune, India	6th	100 m	11.76
2013	Asian Championships	Pune, India	3rd	4 × 100 m relay	44.44
