= Athletics at the East Asian Games =

Athletics is one of the sports at the quadrennial East Asian Games competition. It has been one of the sports held at the Games since the inaugural edition in 1993.

== Editions ==
Games	Year	Host city	Host country
I	1993	Shanghai	China
II	1997	Busan	South Korea
III	2001	Osaka	Japan
IV	2005	Macau	Macau
V	2009	Hong Kong	Hong Kong
VI	2013	Tianjin	China

== See also ==
East Asian Games records in athletics
