= Busan Asiad Main Stadium =

Multi-purpose stadium in Busan, South Korea

Coordinates: 35°11′24.0″N 129°03′29.6″E

Asiad Main Stadium
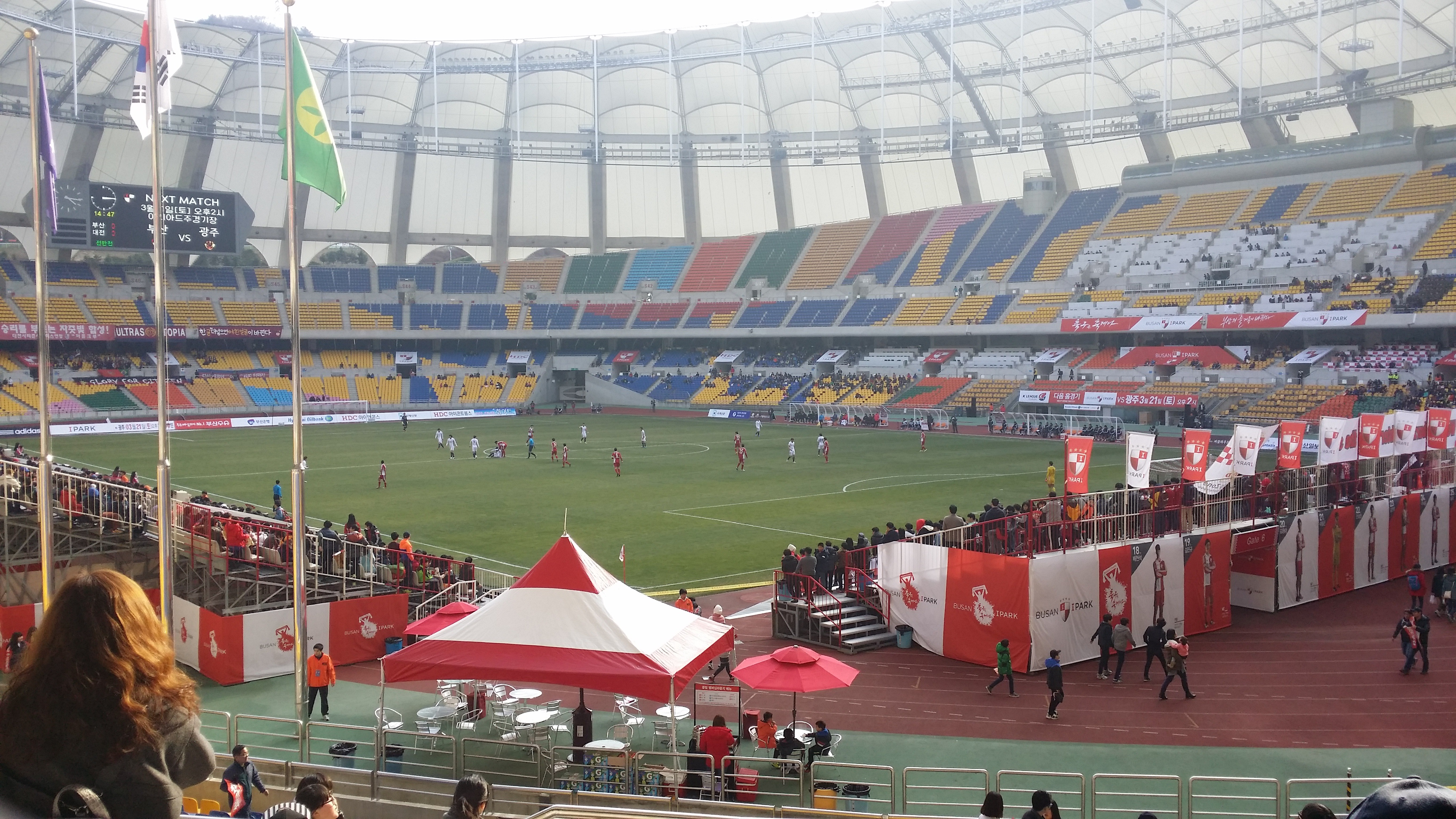
- Interactive map of Asiad Main Stadium
- Location: 344 World Cup-daero, Geoje-dong, Yeonje-gu, Busan, South Korea
- Owner: Busan Metropolitan City Hall
- Operator: Busan Metropolitan City Sports Facility Management Office
- Capacity: 53,769

Construction
- Opened: September 2001
- Cost: 226.9 billion won

Tenant
- Busan IPark

Busan Asiad Main Stadium (Korean: 부산아시아드주경기장) is a multi-purpose stadium in Busan, South Korea. It was built for the 2002 Asian Games and was also used for matches at the 2002 FIFA World Cup. It has a capacity of 53,769. The stadium hosted the opening and closing ceremonies of the 2002 Asian Games and was also the venue of athletics events during the games. It is the home venue of the K League club Busan IPark.

== 2002 FIFA World Cup ==
The stadium was one of the venues of the 2002 FIFA World Cup, and held the following matches:

Date	Team 1	Result	Team 2	Round	Attendance
2 June 2002	Paraguay	2–2	South Africa	Group B	25,186
4 June 2002	South Korea	2–0	Poland	Group D	48,760
6 June 2002	France	0–0	Uruguay	Group A	38,289

Events and tenants
Preceded by Rajamangala Stadium; Bangkok	Asian Games Football tournament Final Venue; 2002	Succeeded by Jassim Bin Hamad Stadium; Doha
