= 2003 Asian Athletics Championships =

2003 Asian Championships
- Dates: September 20–23
- Host city: Manila, Philippines
- Events: 43
- Participation: 37 nations

The 15th Asian Athletics Championships were held in Manila, Philippines on September 20–23, 2003.

The Philippines last hosted the tournament in 1993. The Philippines also rejected bids from Japan to concede hosting duties to it.

== Results ==
=== Men ===
Event	Gold		Silver		Bronze	
100 metres	Chen Haijian; China	10.25	Gennadiy Chernovol; Kazakhstan	10.27	Salem Mubarak Al-Yami; Saudi Arabia	10.28
200 metres	Fawzi Al-Shammari; Kuwait	20.70	Hamed Hamdan Al-Bishi; Saudi Arabia	20.73	Yang Yaozu; China	20.82
400 metres	Fawzi Al-Shammari; Kuwait	45.16	Hamdan Obah Al-Bishi; Saudi Arabia	45.39	Yuki Yamaguchi; Japan	46.18
800 metres	Adam Abdu Adam Ali; Qatar	1:46.20	Salem Amer Al-Badri; Qatar	1:46.95	Rashid Mohammed; Bahrain	1:47.09
1500 metres	Rashid Ramzi; Bahrain	3:41.66	Saif Saeed Shaheen; Qatar	3:42.79	Fumikazu Kobayashi; Japan	3:42.96
5000 metres	Abdulaziz Abdelrahman Al-Ameeri; Qatar	13:58.89	Saif Saeed Shaheen; Qatar	13:58.92	Nobuya Matsunaga; Japan	14:12.73
10,000 metres	Abdullah Ahmed Hassan; Qatar	28:45.64	Abdulhak Zakaria; Bahrain	30:04.13	Eduardo Buenavista; Philippines	30:06.29
3000 metres steeplechase	Khamis Seif Abdullah; Qatar	8:51.60	Wu Wen-chien; Chinese Taipei	8:55.38	Yasunori Uchitomi; Japan	8:56.31
110 metres hurdles	Shi Dongpeng; China	13.50	Park Tae-kyong; South Korea	13.71	Wu Youjia; China	13.80
400 metres hurdles	Mubarak Al-Nubi; Qatar	49.19	Yevgeniy Meleshenko; Kazakhstan	49.55	Chen Tien-wen; Chinese Taipei	50.72
4 × 100 metres relay	China; Shen Yunbao; He Jun; Yang Yaozu; Chen Haijian	39.22	Thailand; Sophanish Vissanu; Suwonprateep Sittichai; Janthana Ekkachai; Wonsala Seksan	39.57	Japan; Kazuhiro Tamura; Shingo Kawabata; Yusuke Omae; Takayuki Kon	39.59
4 × 400 metres relay	Sri Lanka; Rohan Pradeep Kumara; Ranga Wimalawansa; Prasanna Amarasekara; Sugath Thilakaratne	3:03.05	Japan; Yuki Yamaguchi; Masayuki Okusako; Mitsuhiro Sato; Takahiko Yamamura	3:03.59	Qatar; Yaser Omar Elhaj; Yaser Mohamed Abkar; Mohammed Abdulrahman Musa; Salaheddine Bakar	3:04.32 NR
20 kilometres walk	Han Yucheng; China	1:21:12 CR	Yuki Yamazaki; Japan	1:21:54	Bai Liansheng; China	1:22:14
High jump	Wang Zhouzhou; China	2.23	Bae Kyung-ho; South Korea	2.19	Naoyuki Daigo; Japan; Loo Kum Zee; Malaysia	2.19
Pole vault	Grigoriy Yegorov; Kazakhstan	5.40	Satoru Yasuda; Japan	5.30	Kim Se-in; South Korea	5.10
Long jump	Hussein Taher Al-Sabee; Saudi Arabia	8.23	Zhou Can; China	8.11	Shinichi Terano; Japan	8.04
Triple jump	Kazuyoshi Ishikawa; Japan	16.72	Gu Junjie; China	16.68	Wu Ji; China	16.67
Shot put	Bilal Saad Mubarak; Qatar	19.41	Shakti Singh; India	19.04	Khalid Habash Al-Suwaidi; Qatar	18.57
Discus throw	Wu Tao; China	61.43	Abbas Samimi; Iran	59.51	Anil Kumar; India	59.50
Hammer throw	Ali Al-Zinkawi; Kuwait	70.62	Hiroaki Doi; Japan	70.11	Dilshod Nazarov; Tajikistan	69.90
Javelin throw	Li Rongxiang; China	79.25	Yukifumi Murakami; Japan	77.04	Sergey Voynov; Uzbekistan	76.09
Decathlon	Vitaliy Smirnov; Uzbekistan	8021 pts CR	Pavel Dubitskiy; Kazakhstan	7604 pts	Pavel Andreev; Uzbekistan	7487 pts
WR world record | AR area record | CR championship record | GR games record | NR national record | OR Olympic record | PB personal best | SB season best | WL world leading (in a given season)

=== Women ===
Event	Gold		Silver		Bronze	
100 metres	Lyubov Perepelova; Uzbekistan	11.43	Qin Wangping; China	11.56	Guzel Khubbieva; Uzbekistan	11.57
200 metres	Lyubov Perepelova; Uzbekistan	23.11	Chen Lisha; China	23.39	Guzel Khubbieva; Uzbekistan	23.63
400 metres	Yin Yin Khine; Myanmar	52.96	Bu Fanfang; China	52.97	Svetlana Bodritskaya; Kazakhstan	53.19
800 metres	Yin Yin Khine; Myanmar	2:01.96	Tatyana Roslanova; Kazakhstan	2:02.41	Zamira Amirova; Uzbekistan	2:02.84
1500 metres	Tatyana Borisova; Kyrgyzstan	4:15.97	Madhuri A. Singh; India	4:17.87	Svetlana Lukasheva; Kazakhstan	4:23.12
5000 metres	Sun Yingjie; China	15:48.42	Yuko Manabe; Japan	15:59.71	Hiromi Fujii; Japan	16:31.18
10,000 metres	Sun Yingjie; China	32:37.04	Sujeewa Nilmini Jayasena; Sri Lanka	34:46.99	Lashram Aruna Devi; India	37:23.28
100 metres hurdles	Su Yiping; China	13.09	Feng Yun; China	13.25	Trecia Roberts; Thailand	13.29
400 metres hurdles	Huang Xiaoxiao; China	55.66	Natalya Torshina; Kazakhstan	55.88	Wassana Winatho; Thailand	56.40
20 kilometres walk	Ha Mingming; China	1:31:47 CR	Zou Ying; China	1:32:07	Yuan Yufang; Malaysia	1:32:25 NR
4 × 100 metres relay	Thailand; Nongnuch Sanrat; Sangwan Jaksunin; Jutamass Tawoncharoen; Orranut Klomdee	44.25 =NR	Japan	44.56	China	44.97
4 × 400 metres relay	China; Chen Lisha; Zhang Xiaoyuan; Huang Xiaoxiao; Bu Fanfang	3:31.30	Kazakhstan; Olga Tsurikova; Tatyana Roslanova; Olga Tereshkova; Svetlana Bodritskaya	3:32.82	India; Pinki Pramanik; Manjeet Kaur; Sathi Geetha; Kalpana Reddy	3:35.34
High jump	Bui Thi Nhung; Vietnam	1.88	Miyuki Aoyama; Japan	1.84	Noengrothai Chaipetch; Thailand	1.84
Pole vault	Wu Sha; China	4.20 =CR	Takayo Kondo; Japan	4.10	Ni Putu Desy Margawati; Indonesia	3.90
Long jump	Anastasiya Zhuravlyeva; Uzbekistan	6.53	Liang Shuyan; China	6.51	Lerma Gabito; Philippines	6.50
Triple jump	Huang Qiuyan; China	14.39 CR	Anastasiya Zhuravlyeva; Uzbekistan	14.21	Zhang Hao; China	13.63
Shot put	Li Meiju; China	18.45	Li Fengfeng; China	18.07	Chinatsu Mori; Japan	17.80
Discus throw	Li Yanfeng; China	61.87	Neelam Jaswant Singh; India	58.64	Xu Shaoyang; China	58.13
Hammer throw	Gu Yuan; China	70.78	Liu Yinghui; China	66.66	Masumi Aya; Japan	64.04
Javelin throw	Ma Ning; China	57.05	Chang Jung-Yeon; South Korea	53.23	Anne Maheshi De Silva; Sri Lanka	50.18
Heptathlon	Irina Naumenko; Kazakhstan	5845 pts	Yuki Nakata; Japan	5723 pts	Shen Shengfei; China	5633 pts
WR world record | AR area record | CR championship record | GR games record | NR national record | OR Olympic record | PB personal best | SB season best | WL world leading (in a given season)

== Medal table ==
* Host nation (Philippines)

Rank	Nation	Gold	Silver	Bronze	Total
1	China	19	10	8	37
2	Qatar	6	3	1	10
3	Uzbekistan	4	1	5	10
4	Kuwait	3	0	0	3
5	Kazakhstan	2	6	2	10
6	Myanmar	2	0	0	2
7	Japan	1	10	10	21
8	Saudi Arabia	1	2	1	4
9	Thailand	1	1	3	5
10	Bahrain	1	1	1	3
10	Sri Lanka	1	1	1	3
12	Kyrgyzstan	1	0	0	1
12	Vietnam	1	0	0	1
14	India	0	3	3	6
15	South Korea	0	3	1	4
16	Chinese Taipei	0	1	1	2
17	Iran	0	1	0	1
18	Malaysia	0	0	2	2
18	Philippines*	0	0	2	2
20	Indonesia	0	0	1	1
20	Tajikistan	0	0	1	1
Totals (21 entries)		43	43	43	129

== Participating nations ==
- Bahrain
- Brunei
- Bangladesh
- China
- Chinese Taipei
- Hong Kong
- India
- Indonesia
- Iran
- Japan
- Kazakhstan
- Kuwait
- Kyrgyzstan
- Laos
- Lebanon
- Macau
- Malaysia
- Maldives
- Mongolia
- Myanmar
- Nepal
- Oman
- Pakistan
- Palestine
- Philippines
- Qatar
- Saudi Arabia
- Singapore
- South Korea
- Sri Lanka
- Syria
- Tajikistan
- Thailand
- Timor-Leste
- Uzbekistan
- Vietnam
- Yemen

== See also ==
- 2003 in athletics (track and field)
