= 2011 Asian Athletics Championships – Women's 100 metres =

The women's 100 metres at the 2011 Asian Athletics Championships was held at the Kobe Universiade Memorial Stadium on 7–8 July.

== Medalists ==
Gold	Silver	Bronze
Guzel Khubbieva; Uzbekistan	Wei Yongli; China	Tao Yujia; China

== Results ==
=== Heats ===
First 2 in each heat (Q) and 2 best performers (q) advanced to the final.

Wind:
Heat 1: +0.3 m/s, Heat 2: –0.1 m/s, Heat 3: +1.0 m/s

Rank	Heat	Name	Nationality	Time	Notes
1	3	Guzel Khubbieva	Uzbekistan	11.50	Q
2	2	Wei Yongli	China	11.60	Q
3	3	Nao Okabe	Japan	11.64	Q
4	1	Tao Yujia	China	11.72	Q
5	1	Kana Ichikawa	Japan	11.76	Q
6	1	Olga Bludova	Kazakhstan	11.80	q
7	2	Maryam Tousi	Iran	11.83	Q
7	3	Nongnuch Sanrat	Thailand	11.83	q
9	2	Momoko Takahashi	Japan	11.85	
10	2	Orranut Klomdee	Thailand	11.98	
11	3	Liao Ching-Hsien	Chinese Taipei	12.06	
12	2	Fong Yee Pui	Hong Kong	12.25	
13	1	Leung Hau Sze	Hong Kong	12.30	
14	2	Dana Hussein Abdul-Razzaq	Iraq	12.38	
15	1	Yelena Ryabova	Turkmenistan	12.40	
16	3	Afa Ismail	Maldives	12.98	
17	1	Tungalag Battsengel	Mongolia	13.16	
18	2	Io In Chi	Macau	13.40	
19	3	Manevanh Chanthavong	Laos	13.70	

=== Final ===
Wind: +1.9 m/s

Rank	Lane	Name	Nationality	Time	Notes
1st place, gold medalist(s)	5	Guzel Khubbieva	Uzbekistan	11.39	
2nd place, silver medalist(s)	6	Wei Yongli	China	11.70	
3rd place, bronze medalist(s)	7	Tao Yujia	China	11.74	
4	4	Nao Okabe	Japan	11.79	
5	3	Nongnuch Sanrat	Thailand	11.80	
6	8	Maryam Tousi	Iran	11.81	
7	2	Olga Bludova	Kazakhstan	11.82	
	9	Kana Ichikawa	Japan	DNS	
