= Athletics at the 2010 Asian Games – Women's 100 metres =

Women's 100 metres at the 2010 Asian Games
- Venue: Aoti Main Stadium
- Dates: 21–22 November 2010
- Competitors: 27 from 20 nations

Medalists
gold medal	Chisato Fukushima	Japan
silver medal	Guzel Khubbieva	Uzbekistan
bronze medal	Vũ Thị Hương	Vietnam

The women's 100 metres event at the 2010 Asian Games was held at the Aoti Main Stadium, Guangzhou, China on 21–22 November.

== Schedule ==
All times are China Standard Time (UTC+08:00)

Date	Time	Event
Sunday, 21 November 2010	17:00	Round 1
Monday, 22 November 2010	17:15	Semifinals
Monday, 22 November 2010	19:15	Final

== Records ==
Prior to this competition, the existing world, Asian and Games records were as follows.

World Record	Florence Griffith Joyner (USA)	10.49	Indianapolis, United States	16 July 1988
Asian Record	Li Xuemei (CHN)	10.79	Shanghai, China	18 October 1997
Games Record	Susanthika Jayasinghe (SRI)	11.15	Busan, South Korea	8 October 2002

== Results ==
Legend

- DNS — Did not start

=== Round 1 ===
- Qualification: First 3 in each heat (Q) and the next 4 fastest (q) advance to the semifinals.

==== Heat 1 ====
- Wind: +0.2 m/s

Rank	Athlete	Time	Notes
1	Vũ Thị Hương (VIE)	11.56	Q
2	Momoko Takahashi (JPN)	11.78	Q
3	Ye Jiabei (CHN)	11.84	Q
4	Maryam Tousi (IRI)	12.03	q
5	Amanda Choo (SIN)	12.04	
6	Ýelena Rýabowa (TKM)	12.29	
7	Faten Abdulnabi (BRN)	12.83	

==== Heat 2 ====
- Wind: +0.8 m/s

Rank	Athlete	Time	Notes
1	Nongnuch Sanrat (THA)	11.73	Q
2	Tao Yujia (CHN)	11.74	Q
3	Liao Ching-hsien (TPE)	11.91	Q
4	Siti Zubaidah Adabi (MAS)	12.01	q
5	Viktoriya Zyabkina (KAZ)	12.07	
6	Leung Hau Sze (HKG)	12.12	

==== Heat 3 ====
- Wind: +0.8 m/s

Rank	Athlete	Time	Notes
1	Chisato Fukushima (JPN)	11.41	Q
2	Guzel Khubbieva (UZB)	11.54	Q
3	Neeranuch Klomdee (THA)	11.64	Q
4	Gretta Taslakian (LIB)	11.84	q
5	Lam On Ki (HKG)	12.09	
6	Io In Chi (MAC)	12.78	
7	Boudsadee Vongdala (LAO)	13.54	

==== Heat 4 ====
- Wind: −0.4 m/s

Rank	Athlete	Time	Notes
1	Lê Ngọc Phượng (VIE)	11.85	Q
2	Olga Bludova (KAZ)	11.93	Q
3	Nurul Sarah Kadir (MAS)	11.99	Q
4	H. M. Jyothi (IND)	12.04	q
5	Beauty Nazmun Nahar (BAN)	12.72	
6	Chandra Kala Thapa (NEP)	13.28	
—	Afa Ismail (MDV)	DNS	

=== Semifinals ===
- Qualification: First 3 in each heat (Q) and the next 2 fastest (q) advance to the final.

==== Heat 1 ====
- Wind: +1.5 m/s

Rank	Athlete	Time	Notes
1	Vũ Thị Hương (VIE)	11.46	Q
2	Momoko Takahashi (JPN)	11.59	Q
3	Ye Jiabei (CHN)	11.77	Q
4	Nongnuch Sanrat (THA)	11.80	
5	Olga Bludova (KAZ)	11.87	
6	Liao Ching-hsien (TPE)	11.89	
7	Maryam Tousi (IRI)	11.92	
8	Siti Zubaidah Adabi (MAS)	11.93	

==== Heat 2 ====
- Wind: +1.1 m/s

Rank	Athlete	Time	Notes
1	Chisato Fukushima (JPN)	11.32	Q
2	Guzel Khubbieva (UZB)	11.36	Q
3	Neeranuch Klomdee (THA)	11.61	Q
4	Tao Yujia (CHN)	11.65	q
5	Lê Ngọc Phượng (VIE)	11.65	q
6	Gretta Taslakian (LIB)	11.87	
7	Nurul Sarah Kadir (MAS)	11.91	
8	H. M. Jyothi (IND)	11.98	

=== Final ===
- Wind: +1.2 m/s

Rank	Athlete	Time	Notes
1st place, gold medalist(s)	Chisato Fukushima (JPN)	11.33	
2nd place, silver medalist(s)	Guzel Khubbieva (UZB)	11.34	
3rd place, bronze medalist(s)	Vũ Thị Hương (VIE)	11.43	
4	Momoko Takahashi (JPN)	11.50	
5	Tao Yujia (CHN)	11.63	
6	Neeranuch Klomdee (THA)	11.68	
7	Ye Jiabei (CHN)	11.71	
8	Lê Ngọc Phượng (VIE)	11.76	
