= 2013 Asian Athletics Championships – Women's 100 metres =

The women's 100 metres event at the 2013 Asian Athletics Championships was held at the Shree Shiv Chhatrapati Sports Complex on 4 July.

== Medalists ==
Gold	Silver	Bronze
Wei Yongli; China	Chisato Fukushima; Japan	Tao Yujia; China

== Results ==
=== Heats ===
First 2 in each heat (Q) and 2 best performers (q) advanced to the final.

Wind: Heat 1: -0.1 m/s, Heat 2: -0.4 m/s, Heat 3: -0.5 m/s

Rank	Heat	Name	Nationality	Time	Notes
1	2	Wei Yongli	China	11.50	Q
2	1	Chisato Fukushima	Japan	11.59	Q
2	3	Svetlana Ivanchukova	Kazakhstan	11.59	Q
4	3	Orranut Klomdee	Thailand	11.69	Q
5	2	Mayumi Watanabe	Japan	11.70	Q
6	1	Tao Yujia	China	11.76	Q
7	1	Chandra Chathuran	Sri Lanka	11.81	q
8	3	Komalam Selvaretnam	Malaysia	11.83	q
9	3	Guzel Khubbieva	Uzbekistan	11.87	
10	1	Fong Yee Pui	Hong Kong	11.92	
10	2	Merlin Joseph	India	11.92	
12	1	Asha Roy	India	11.94	
13	1	Diana Agliulina	Uzbekistan	12.11	
14	2	Zaidatul Zulkifli	Malaysia	12.12	
15	2	Khanrutai Pakdee	Thailand	12.24	
16	2	Lam On Ki	Hong Kong	12.25	
17	1	Najma Parveen	Pakistan	12.50	
18	2	Shirin Akter	Bangladesh	12.73	
19	1	Afa Ismail	Maldives	13.06	
20	3	Nazmur Nahar Buity	Bangladesh	13.51	
	3	Sharadha Narayanan	India	DQ	FS
	3	Maryam Tousi	Iran	DQ	FS
	2	Maysa Rejepova	Turkmenistan	DNS	
	3	Yelena Ryabova	Turkmenistan	DNS	

=== Final ===
Wind: -0.3 m/s

Rank	Name	Nationality	Time	Notes
1st place, gold medalist(s)	Wei Yongli	China	11.29	PB
2nd place, silver medalist(s)	Chisato Fukushima	Japan	11.53	
3rd place, bronze medalist(s)	Tao Yujia	China	11.63	
4	Mayumi Watanabe	Japan	11.67	
5	Svetlana Ivanchukova	Kazakhstan	11.73	
6	Orranut Klomdee	Thailand	11.76	
7	Chandra Chathuran	Sri Lanka	11.91	
	Komalam Selvaretnam	Malaysia	DQ	
