= Athletics at the 2010 Asian Games – Women's 200 metres =

Women's 200 metres at the 2010 Asian Games
- Venue: Aoti Main Stadium
- Dates: 24–25 November 2010
- Competitors: 17 from 15 nations

Medalists
gold medal	Chisato Fukushima	Japan
silver medal	Vũ Thị Hương	Vietnam
bronze medal	Guzel Khubbieva	Uzbekistan

The women's 200 metres event at the 2010 Asian Games was held at the Aoti Main Stadium, Guangzhou, China on 24–25 November.

== Schedule ==
All times are China Standard Time (UTC+08:00)

Date	Time	Event
Wednesday, 24 November 2010	17:35	Round 1
Thursday, 25 November 2010	18:00	Final

== Records ==
Prior to this competition, the existing world, Asian and Games records were as follows.

World Record	Florence Griffith Joyner (USA)	21.34	Seoul, South Korea	29 September 1988
Asian Record	Li Xuemei (CHN)	22.01	Shanghai, China	22 October 1997
Games Record	Damayanthi Dharsha (SRI)	22.48	Bangkok, Thailand	18 December 1998

== Results ==
Legend

- DNS — Did not start
- DSQ — Disqualified

=== Round 1 ===
- Qualification: First 2 in each heat (Q) and the next 2 fastest (q) advance to the final.

==== Heat 1 ====
- Wind: +1.1 m/s

Rank	Athlete	Time	Notes
1	Guzel Khubbieva (UZB)	24.17	Q
2	Liang Qiuping (CHN)	24.28	Q
3	Maryam Tousi (IRI)	24.45	q
4	Tassaporn Wannakit (THA)	24.60	
5	Lam Ka Im (MAC)	25.89	
6	Beauty Nazmun Nahar (BAN)	29.35	

==== Heat 2 ====
- Wind: +0.3 m/s

Rank	Athlete	Time	Notes
1	Chisato Fukushima (JPN)	23.75	Q
2	Gretta Taslakian (LIB)	24.01	Q
3	Sathi Geetha (IND)	24.08	q
4	Kay Khine Lwin (MYA)	25.20	
5	Ýelena Rýabowa (TKM)	25.33	
—	Afa Ismail (MDV)	DNS	

==== Heat 3 ====
- Wind: +0.3 m/s

Rank	Athlete	Time	Notes
1	Vũ Thị Hương (VIE)	24.05	Q
2	Momoko Takahashi (JPN)	24.13	Q
3	Chandrika Subashini (SRI)	24.46	
4	Tiana Mary Thomas (IND)	24.62	
—	Faten Abdulnabi (BRN)	DSQ	

=== Final ===
- Wind: +1.1 m/s

Rank	Athlete	Time	Notes
1st place, gold medalist(s)	Chisato Fukushima (JPN)	23.62	
2nd place, silver medalist(s)	Vũ Thị Hương (VIE)	23.74	
3rd place, bronze medalist(s)	Guzel Khubbieva (UZB)	23.87	
4	Gretta Taslakian (LIB)	23.90	
5	Sathi Geetha (IND)	23.91	
6	Momoko Takahashi (JPN)	23.97	
7	Liang Qiuping (CHN)	24.13	
8	Maryam Tousi (IRI)	24.56	
