= 2013 Asian Athletics Championships – Women's 200 metres =

The women's 200 metres event at the 2013 Asian Athletics Championships was held at the Shree Shiv Chhatrapati Sports Complex on 6–7 July.

== Medalists ==
Gold	Silver	Bronze
Viktoriya Zyabkina; Kazakhstan	Asha Roy; India	Dutee Chand; India

== Results ==
=== Heats ===
First 2 in each heat (Q) and 2 best performers (q) advanced to the final.

Wind: Heat 1: -0.2 m/s, Heat 2: +0.4 m/s, Heat 3: +0.2 m/s

Rank	Heat	Name	Nationality	Time	Notes
1	1	Maryam Toosi	Iran	23.64	Q
2	1	Dutee Chand	India	23.76	Q
2	2	Viktoriya Zyabkina	Kazakhstan	23.76	Q
4	1	Chisato Fukushima	Japan	23.96	q
5	3	Asha Roy	India	24.01	Q
6	2	Dana Hussain	Iraq	24.09	Q
7	2	Srabani Nanda	India	24.20	q
8	2	Li Manyuan	China	24.24	
9	3	Sujani Buddika	Sri Lanka	24.25	Q
10	3	Olga Andreyeva	Kazakhstan	24.31	
11	1	Lin Huijun	China	24.37	
12	3	Mayumi Watanabe	Japan	24.48	
13	3	Diana Agliulina	Uzbekistan	24.51	
14	3	Komalam Selveretnam	Malaysia	24.82	
15	2	Zaidatul Zulkifli	Malaysia	25.29	
16	3	Najma Parveen	Pakistan	25.74	
17	2	Afa Ismail	Maldives	26.51	
18	3	Zakia Sultana	Bangladesh	26.52	
19	1	Dil Maya Karki	Nepal	27.57	
20	2	Nazmur Nahar Buity	Bangladesh	27.84	
	1	Hui Man Ling	Hong Kong	DQ	
	1	Yelena Ryabova	Turkmenistan	DNS	
	1	Guzel Khubbieva	Uzbekistan	DNS	
	2	Maysa Rejepova	Turkmenistan	DNS	

=== Final ===
Wind: -0.6 m/s

Rank	Name	Nationality	Time	Notes
1st place, gold medalist(s)	Viktoriya Zyabkina	Kazakhstan	23.62	
2nd place, silver medalist(s)	Asha Roy	India	23.71	
3rd place, bronze medalist(s)	Dutee Chand	India	23.811	
4	Chisato Fukushima	Japan	23.812	
5	Maryam Toosi	Iran	23.83	
6	Dana Hussain	Iraq	24.12	
7	Srabani Nanda	India	24.38	
8	Sujani Buddika	Sri Lanka	24.41	
