= 2012 Asian Indoor Athletics Championships – Results =

These are the official results of the 2012 Asian Indoor Athletics Championships which took place on 18–19 February 2012 in Hangzhou, China.

== Men's results ==
=== 60 meters ===
Heats – 18 February

Rank	Heat	Name	Nationality	Time	Notes
1	1	Reza Ghasemi	Iran	6.79	Q
2	3	Hassan Heidarpour	Iran	6.82	Q
3	3	Zhang Peimeng	China	6.87	Q
4	2	Liang Jiahong	China	6.89	Q
5	3	Lai Chun Ho	Hong Kong	6.91	Q
6	1	Zheng Dongsheng	China	6.94	Q
7	3	Meenapra Jirapong	Thailand	6.94	q
8	2	Yeo Foo Ee Gary	Singapore	6.95	Q
9	2	Liaqat Ali	Pakistan	6.95	Q
10	2	Sapwaturrahman	Indonesia	6.96	q
11	1	Tsui Chi Ho	Hong Kong	6.97	Q
12	2	Eisa Al-Youhah	Kuwait	6.98	q
13	3	Lao Iong	Macau	7.09	
14	1	Pao Him Fong	Macau	7.18	
15	2	Ildar Hojayev	Turkmenistan	7.20	
16	1	Valerii Ponomarev	Kyrgyzstan	7.24	
17	3	Akmurad Orazgeldiyev	Turkmenistan	7.26	
	1	Achitbileg Battulga	Mongolia	DQ	FS

Semifinals – 18 February

Rank	Heat	Name	Nationality	Time	Notes
1	1	Hassan Heidarpour	Iran	6.59	Q, NR
2	1	Liang Jiahong	China	6.64	Q
3	1	Lai Chun Ho	Hong Kong	6.67	q, NR
4	2	Reza Ghasemi	Iran	6.71	Q
5	1	Yeo Foo Ee Gary	Singapore	6.71	q, NR
6	1	Sapwaturrahman	Indonesia	6.73	NR
7	1	Meenapra Jirapong	Thailand	6.77	
8	2	Zhang Peimeng	China	6.83	Q
9	2	Tsui Chi Ho	Hong Kong	6.90	
10	2	Eisa Al-Youhah	Kuwait	6.97	
11	2	Liaqat Ali	Pakistan	6.99	
	2	Zheng Dongsheng	China	DQ	FS

Final – 19 February

Rank	Lane	Name	Nationality	Time	Notes
1st place, gold medalist(s)	4	Reza Ghasemi	Iran	6.68	
2nd place, silver medalist(s)	1	Lai Chun Ho	Hong Kong	6.78	
3rd place, bronze medalist(s)	3	Hassan Heidarpour	Iran	6.78	
4	2	Yeo Foo Ee Gary	Singapore	6.87	
5	6	Zhang Peimeng	China	6.87	
6	5	Liang Jiahong	China	7.00	

=== 400 meters ===
Heats – 18 February

Rank	Heat	Name	Nationality	Time	Notes
1	1	Chi Yanan	China	48.59	Q
2	1	Amin Ghelichi	Iran	48.88	Q
3	1	Sergej Zaikov	Kazakhstan	48.90	q
4	2	Reza Boazar	Iran	48.92	Q
5	1	Zhang Yunpeng	China	49.00	q
6	2	Chang Pengben	China	49.08	Q
7	2	Dmitriy Komkov	Kazakhstan	49.15	
8	2	Chen Chieh	Chinese Taipei	49.88	
9	2	Begench Durdumov	Turkmenistan	53.92	
10	1	Gaubold Jantsandorj	Mongolia	54.75	

Final – 18 February

Rank	Lane	Name	Nationality	Time	Notes
1st place, gold medalist(s)	5	Reza Boazar	Iran	48.09	
2nd place, silver medalist(s)	4	Chang Pengben	China	48.47	
3rd place, bronze medalist(s)	3	Amin Ghelichi	Iran	48.64	
4	6	Chi Yanan	China	48.74	
5	2	Sergej Zaikov	Kazakhstan	48.97	
6	1	Zhang Yunpeng	China	49.55	

=== 800 meters ===
19 February

Rank	Name	Nationality	Time	Notes
1st place, gold medalist(s)	Mohammad Al-Azemi	Kuwait	1:47.37	CR, NR
2nd place, silver medalist(s)	Adnan Al-Mntfage	Iraq	1:49.42	NR
3rd place, bronze medalist(s)	Yang Xiaofei	China	1:50.32	
4	Teng Haining	China	1:51.05	
5	Omar Al-Rasheedi	Kuwait	1:53.07	
6	Yin Xiaolong	China	1:57.65	

=== 1500 meters ===
18 February

Rank	Name	Nationality	Time	Notes
1st place, gold medalist(s)	Mohammed Shaween	Saudi Arabia	3:57.84	NR
2nd place, silver medalist(s)	Mohamad Al-Garni	Qatar	3:58.04	
3rd place, bronze medalist(s)	Omar Al-Rasheedi	Kuwait	3:59.83	
4	Ranjan Kuttanda Kariappa	India	4:00.03	
5	Zhang Haikun	China	4:00.90	
6	Ravindra Singh Rautela	India	4:01.43	
7	Jiang Bing	China	4:01.49	
8	Yu Yang	China	4:01.77	
9	Boldoo Odbayar	Mongolia	4:11.83	

=== 3000 meters ===
19 February

Rank	Name	Nationality	Time	Notes
1st place, gold medalist(s)	Bilisuma Shugi	Bahrain	7:43.88	
2nd place, silver medalist(s)	Mohamad Al-Garni	Qatar	7:46.17	
3rd place, bronze medalist(s)	Alemu Bekele Gebre	Bahrain	7:48.04	
4	Artyom Kossinov	Kazakhstan	8:02.36	
5	Yang Tao	China	8:11.41	
6	Yang Le	China	8:14.99	
7	Erzhan Askarov	Kyrgyzstan	8:43.69	
8	Boldoo Odbayar	Mongolia	8:52.83	NR
9	Muhammad Al-Quraisy	Indonesia	8:58.64	NR
	Lin Xiangqian	China	DNF	

=== 60 meters hurdles ===
Heats – 18 February

Rank	Heat	Name	Nationality	Time	Notes
1	2	Abdulaziz Al-Mandeel	Kuwait	7.89	Q
2	1	Yin Jing	China	7.95	Q
3	2	Jiang Fan	China	7.97	Q
4	2	Ji Wei	China	7.97	q
5	1	Rouollah Asgarigandomani	Iran	8.07	Q
6	2	Ko Wen-ting	Chinese Taipei	8.19	q
7	1	Mohsin Ali	Pakistan	8.20	
8	2	Iong Kim Hai	Macau	8.42	
9	1	Anousone Saysa	Laos	9.03	
	1	Fawaz Al-Shammari	Kuwait	DQ	FS

Final – 18 February

Rank	Lane	Name	Nationality	Time	Notes
1st place, gold medalist(s)	6	Jiang Fan	China	7.74	CR
2nd place, silver medalist(s)	3	Abdulaziz Al-Mandeel	Kuwait	7.82	
3rd place, bronze medalist(s)	2	Ji Wei	China	7.85	
4	4	Yin Jing	China	7.95	
5	5	Rouollah Asgarigandomani	Iran	8.01	
6	1	Ko Wen-ting	Chinese Taipei	8.23	

=== High jump ===
19 February

Rank	Name	Nationality	2.00	2.05	2.10	2.15	2.20	2.24	2.28	2.31	2.34	2.37	2.40	Result	Notes
1st place, gold medalist(s)	Mutaz Essa Barshim	Qatar	–	–	o	o	o	o	xo	o	o	o	xxx	2.37	WL, CR, AR
2nd place, silver medalist(s)	Zhang Guowei	China	–	–	o	o	xo	o	o	xxx				2.28	
3rd place, bronze medalist(s)	Majd Eddin Ghazal	Syria	o	o	o	o	o	xxo	xxx					2.24	NR
4	Wang Yu	China	–	o	o	o	xxx							2.15	
5	Thomas Chenapparambil Jitin	India	–	o	xo	o	xxx							2.15	
6	Muamafa Barsham	Qatar	xo	o	xo	xxx								2.10	
7	Lam Ho Fung	Hong Kong	o	xxo	xxx									2.05	
	Ebrahim Al-Enezi	Kuwait	xxx											NM	
	Wang Chen	China												DNS	

=== Pole vault ===
18 February

Rank	Name	Nationality	4.50	4.75	5.00	5.10	5.20	5.30	5.40	5.50	5.60	Result	Notes
1st place, gold medalist(s)	Yang Yansheng	China	–	–	–	–	–	o	–	xxo	xxx	5.50	
2nd place, silver medalist(s)	Zhang Wei	China	–	–	–	o	–	o	xxo	xxx		5.40	
3rd place, bronze medalist(s)	Junya Nagata	Japan	–	–	o	o	o	o	xxx			5.30	
4	Mohsen Rabbani	Iran	–	–	xo	xxx						5.00	
5	Xie Xing	China	–	xxo	xo	–	xxx					5.00	
	Bineesh Jacob	India	xxx									NM	
	Naoya Kawaguchi	Japan	–	–	xxx							NM	
	Jin Minsub	South Korea	–	–	xxx							NM	

=== Long jump ===
18 February

Rank	Name	Nationality	#1	#2	#3	#4	#5	#6	Result	Notes
1st place, gold medalist(s)	Li Jinzhe	China	x	x	7.52	7.73	x	7.98	7.98	
2nd place, silver medalist(s)	Rikiya Saruyama	Japan	7.58	7.63	x	x	7.50	x	7.63	
3rd place, bronze medalist(s)	Premkumar Kumaravel	India	7.62	7.36	7.54	7.33	x	7.26	7.62	NR
4	Lin Qing	China	7.50	7.51	7.62	7.16	x	7.45	7.62	
5	Zhang Xiaoyi	China	7.38	7.61	7.42	–	–	–	7.61	
6	Konstantin Safronov	Kazakhstan	7.30	7.51	7.54	7.40	7.57	7.56	7.57	
7	Yohei Sugai	Japan	7.16	7.54	x	7.48	x	x	7.54	
8	Supanara Sukhasvasti	Thailand	7.36	x	7.47	7.32	x	x	7.47	
9	Mohammad Arzande	Iran	7.27	7.36	7.43				7.43	
10	Kirill Agoyev	Kazakhstan	x	x	7.31				7.31	
11	Lin Ching-hsuan	Chinese Taipei	7.19	x	x				7.19	
12	Si Kuan Wang	Macau	6.32	x	–				6.32	
	Saleh Al-Haddad	Kuwait	–	–	–				DNF	

=== Triple jump ===
19 February

Rank	Name	Nationality	#1	#2	#3	#4	#5	#6	Result	Notes
1st place, gold medalist(s)	Dong Bin	China	16.76	17.01	x	16.94	16.72	16.98	17.01	CR, =NR
2nd place, silver medalist(s)	Cao Shuo	China	16.40	17.01	16.34	16.38	–	x	17.01	
3rd place, bronze medalist(s)	Li Yanxi	China	16.00	15.98	16.19	16.23	x	x	16.23	
4	Roman Valiyev	Kazakhstan	x	16.22	x	15.98	16.04	15.97	16.22	
5	Tseng Ke Chen Stefan	Singapore	13.51	13.69	x	x	14.76	x	14.76	
	Yohei Kajikawa	Japan							DNS	
	Si Kuan Wang	Macau							DNS	

=== Shot put ===
19 February

Rank	Name	Nationality	#1	#2	#3	#4	#5	#6	Result	Notes
1st place, gold medalist(s)	Zhang Jun	China	19.78	x	19.37	19.33	x	19.31	19.78	CR
2nd place, silver medalist(s)	Wang Guangfu	China	19.26	19.40	19.10	19.39	19.00	18.88	19.40	
3rd place, bronze medalist(s)	Wang Like	China	18.53	19.09	18.75	18.68	18.66	18.79	19.09	
4	Ahmad Gholoum	Kuwait	18.86	18.83	19.08	x	18.68	x	19.08	NR
5	Mohammad Hossen Eskandari	Iran	17.83	17.64	17.16	x	17.86	17.88	17.88	
6	Ivan Ivanov	Kazakhstan	16.87	17.74	17.56	17.09	x	x	17.74	
7	Tejen Hommadov	Turkmenistan	14.61	15.43	15.08	15.11	15.81	15.43	15.81	NR

=== Heptathlon ===
18–19 February

The highest mark recorded in each event is highlighted in yellow

Rank	Athlete	Nationality	60m	LJ	SP	HJ	60m H	PV	1000m	Points	Notes
1st place, gold medalist(s)	Dmitriy Karpov	Kazakhstan	7.20	7.10	16.26	2.00	8.09	5.00	2:52.61	5928	CR, SB
2nd place, silver medalist(s)	Keisuke Ushiro	Japan	7.33	6.65	13.95	2.03	8.61	4.90	2:44.97	5590	
3rd place, bronze medalist(s)	Hiromasa Tanaka	Japan	7.20	6.41	12.04	1.85	8.72	4.70	3:02.87	5033	
4	Joseph Vinod Pulimoottil	India	7.36	6.65	12.37	1.94	8.83	4.20	3:08.78	4907	

== Women's results ==
=== 60 meters ===
Heats – 18 February

Rank	Heat	Name	Nationality	Time	Notes
1	3	Tao Yujia	China	7.49	Q
2	3	Viktoriya Zyabkina	Kazakhstan	7.49	Q
3	1	Olga Bludova	Kazakhstan	7.50	Q
4	1	Wei Yongli	China	7.54	Q
5	3	Liao Ching-hsien	Chinese Taipei	7.68	Q
6	2	Jiang Shan	China	7.69	Q
7	2	Elena Ryabova	Turkmenistan	7.73	Q
8	2	Fong Yee Pui	Hong Kong	7.74	Q
9	1	Lam On Ki	Hong Kong	7.74	Q
10	3	Ieong Loi	Macau	7.88	q
11	1	Nurul Imaniar	Indonesia	7.92	q
12	1	Veronica Pereira	Singapore	8.00	q
13	2	Ksenia Kadkina	Kyrgyzstan	8.01	
14	2	Tungalag Battsengel	Mongolia	8.54	

Semifinals – 18 February

Rank	Heat	Name	Nationality	Time	Notes
1	1	Viktoriya Zyabkina	Kazakhstan	7.33	Q, CR
2	1	Tao Yujia	China	7.37	Q
3	1	Wei Yongli	China	7.40	q
4	2	Olga Bludova	Kazakhstan	7.40	Q
5	2	Jiang Shan	China	7.58	Q
6	1	Liao Ching-hsien	Chinese Taipei	7.60	q
7	1	Fong Yee Pui	Hong Kong	7.65	
8	1	Lam On Ki	Hong Kong	7.65	
9	2	Elena Ryabova	Turkmenistan	7.66	NR
10	2	Ieong Loi	Macau	7.82	
11	2	Nurul Imaniar	Indonesia	7.83	NR
	1	Veronica Pereira	Singapore	DNS	

Final – 19 February

Rank	Lane	Name	Nationality	Time	Notes
1st place, gold medalist(s)	2	Wei Yongli	China	7.37	
2nd place, silver medalist(s)	5	Tao Yujia	China	7.40	
3rd place, bronze medalist(s)	3	Viktoriya Zyabkina	Kazakhstan	7.44	
4	4	Olga Bludova	Kazakhstan	7.49	
5	1	Liao Ching-hsien	Chinese Taipei	7.63	
6	6	Jiang Shan	China	7.70	

=== 400 meters ===
Heats – 18 February

Rank	Heat	Name	Nationality	Time	Notes
1	2	Chen Jingwen	China	55.33	Q
2	2	Maryam Toosi	Iran	55.55	Q
3	2	Alexandra Kuzina	Kazakhstan	56.34	q
4	1	Tang Xiaoyin	China	56.44	Q
5	1	Natalya Tukova	Kazakhstan	56.76	Q
6	1	Cheng Chong	China	56.87	q
7	2	Nguyen Thi Thuy	Vietnam	58.20	
8	2	Iuliia Khodykina	Kyrgyzstan	58.34	
9	1	Munguntuya Batgerel	Mongolia	59.17	
10	1	Leong Ka Man	Macau	1:00.03	
11	2	Solongo Batbold	Mongolia	1:01.92	

Final – 18 February

Rank	Lane	Name	Nationality	Time	Notes
1st place, gold medalist(s)	4	Maryam Toosi	Iran	53.85	NR
2nd place, silver medalist(s)	6	Chen Jingwen	China	54.17	
3rd place, bronze medalist(s)	5	Tang Xiaoyin	China	55.06	
4	2	Alexandra Kuzina	Kazakhstan	55.96	
5	1	Cheng Chong	China	56.18	
6	3	Natalya Tukova	Kazakhstan	56.94	

=== 800 meters ===
19 February

Rank	Name	Nationality	Time	Notes
1st place, gold medalist(s)	Zhao Jing	China	2:04.15	
2nd place, silver medalist(s)	Genzeb Shumi Regasa	Bahrain	2:05.96	
3rd place, bronze medalist(s)	Song Tingting	China	2:11.32	
4	Pratima Tudu	India	2:13.42	
5	Aster Tesfaye Tilahun	Bahrain	2:15.23	
6	Leong Ka Man	Macau	2:21.92	NR
7	Toly Phengphalane	Laos	2:34.74	
	Mart Dashvandan	Mongolia	DNS	

=== 1500 meters ===
18 February

Rank	Name	Nationality	Time	Notes
1st place, gold medalist(s)	Genzeb Shumi Regasa	Bahrain	4:15.85	
2nd place, silver medalist(s)	Betlhem Desalegn	United Arab Emirates	4:16.97	NR
3rd place, bronze medalist(s)	Liu Fang	China	4:18.32	
4	Xu Qiuzi	China	4:19.98	
5	Zhang Jie	China	4:20.74	
6	Simon Rajam Bindhu	India	4:20.92	
7	Aster Tesfaye Tilahun	Bahrain	4:26.12	
8	Alia Saeed Mohammed	United Arab Emirates	4:28.32	
9	Leila Ebrahimi	Iran	4:31.43	
10	Luiza Kutueva	Kyrgyzstan	4:48.08	
11	Semjid Namjilsuren	Mongolia	5:08.28	NR

=== 3000 meters ===
19 February

Rank	Name	Nationality	Time	Notes
1st place, gold medalist(s)	Shitaye Eshete	Bahrain	8:49.27	CR, NR
2nd place, silver medalist(s)	Betlhem Desalegn	United Arab Emirates	8:53.56	NR
3rd place, bronze medalist(s)	Tejitu Daba	Bahrain	8:53.75	
4	Alia Saeed Mohammed	United Arab Emirates	9:01.03	
5	Fu Tinglian	China	9:06.23	
6	Jin Yuan	China	9:07.09	
7	Li Zhenzhu	China	9:07.62	
8	Suriya Loganathan	India	9:09.81	NR
9	Leila Ebrahimi	Iran	9:58.63	
10	Nguyen Thi Phuong	Vietnam	10:33.72	
11	Luiza Kutueva	Kyrgyzstan	10:34.57	
12	Semjid Namjilsuren	Mongolia	11:21.01	

=== 60 meters hurdles ===
Heats – 18 February

Rank	Heat	Name	Nationality	Time	Notes
1	2	Wu Shuijiao	China	8.33	Q
2	2	Natalya Ivoninskaya	Kazakhstan	8.44	Q
3	1	Anastassiya Soprunova	Kazakhstan	8.58	Q
4	1	Sun Yawei	China	8.60	Q
5	2	Zhang Rong	China	8.61	q
6	2	Anchu Mamachan	India	8.64	q
7	1	Elnaz Komapni	Iran	9.15	
8	1	Dipna Lim Prasad	Singapore	9.25	NR
9	1	Aishwarya Govindappa Mahadev	India	9.36	
10	2	Olesia Korovina	Kyrgyzstan	9.48	

Final – 18 February

Rank	Lane	Name	Nationality	Time	Notes
1st place, gold medalist(s)	4	Wu Shuijiao	China	8.24	CR
2nd place, silver medalist(s)	6	Natalya Ivoninskaya	Kazakhstan	8.29	
3rd place, bronze medalist(s)	5	Sun Yawei	China	8.35	
4	1	Zhang Rong	China	8.46	
5	3	Anastassiya Soprunova	Kazakhstan	8.47	
6	2	Anchu Mamachan	India	8.48	

=== 4 x 400 meters relay ===
19 February

Rank	Nation	Athletes	Time	Notes
1st place, gold medalist(s)	China	Chen Yanmei, Tang Xiaoyin, Cheng Chong, Chen Jingwen	3:40.34	
2nd place, silver medalist(s)	Kazakhstan	Natalya Tukova, Yekaterina Yermak, Margarita Kudinova, Alexandra Kuzina	3:44.85	
3rd place, bronze medalist(s)	Kyrgyzstan	Olesia Korovina, Anna Bulanova, Ksenia Kadkina, Iuliia Khodykina	3:56.11	NR
4	Mongolia	Munguntuya Batgerel, Mart Dashvandan, Solongo Batbold, Tungalag Battsengel	4:02.16	

=== High jump ===
18 February

Rank	Name	Nationality	1.70	1.75	1.80	1.84	1.88	1.92	1.95	Result	Notes
1st place, gold medalist(s)	Zheng Xingjuan	China	–	–	o	o	xo	xo	xxx	1.92	
2nd place, silver medalist(s)	Wang Yang	China	o	o	o	o	xo	xxx		1.88	
3rd place, bronze medalist(s)	Duong Thi Viet Anh	Vietnam	–	o	o	o	xxx			1.84	
4	Chen Yanjun	China	o	o	xxo	xxx				1.80	
4	Sahana Kumari	India	o	o	xxo	xxx				1.80	
6	Miyuki Fukumoto	Japan	o	o	xxx					1.75	
7	Wu Meng-chia	Chinese Taipei	xo	xxx						1.70	

=== Pole vault ===
19 February

Rank	Name	Nationality	3.60	3.80	4.00	4.15	4.30	4.40	4.45	4.50	4.55	4.60	Result	Notes
1st place, gold medalist(s)	Li Ling	China	–	–	–	o	o	o	–	xo	–	x–	4.50	CR, AR
2nd place, silver medalist(s)	Choi Yun-hee	South Korea	–	–	xo	o	xo	xxx					4.30	NR
3rd place, bronze medalist(s)	Megumi Nakada	Japan	–	o	xxo	o	xxx						4.15	
4	Xu Huiqin	China	–	–	o	xo	xxx						4.15	
5	Tatyana Turkova	Kazakhstan	o	o	o	xxx							4.00	
6	Li Caixia	China	–	xxo	xxx								3.80	
6	Miho Imano	Japan	o	xxo	xxx								3.80	
	Riezel Buenaventura	Philippines	xxx										NM	

=== Long jump ===
18 February

Rank	Name	Nationality	#1	#2	#3	#4	#5	#6	Result	Notes
1st place, gold medalist(s)	Lu Minjia	China	6.33	6.32	x	6.31	6.26	x	6.33	
2nd place, silver medalist(s)	Anastassiya Kudinova	Kazakhstan	5.92	x	6.15	x	6.23	x	6.23	
3rd place, bronze medalist(s)	Wang Wupin	China	6.21	x	x	6.14	6.14	6.22	6.22	
4	Lyudmila Grankovskaya	Kazakhstan	x	5.95	x	x	5.69	5.59	5.95	
5	Liu Xiao	China	x	x	5.64	x	x	5.70	5.70	
6	Cheung Lai Yee	Hong Kong	5.52	x	5.38	x	5.47	5.43	5.52	
7	Tse Mang Chi	Hong Kong	5.13	5.17	5.03	5.17	5.01	4.86	5.17	
8	Anna Bulanova	Kyrgyzstan	4.62	4.94	4.62	3.46	x	4.78	4.94	

=== Triple jump ===
18 February

Rank	Name	Nationality	#1	#2	#3	#4	#5	#6	Result	Notes
1st place, gold medalist(s)	Xie Limei	China	13.89	11.68	14.06	x	13.90	13.79	14.06	
2nd place, silver medalist(s)	Li Yanmei	China	13.47	x	13.73	13.36	13.11	13.69	13.73	
3rd place, bronze medalist(s)	Lyudmila Grankovskaya	Kazakhstan	12.39	13.10	13.04	13.22	13.19	x	13.22	
4	Yekaterina Ektova	Kazakhstan	12.92	x	12.69	12.99	13.05	12.93	13.05	
5	Waka Maeda	Japan	12.44	12.45	12.54	12.77	x	12.74	12.77	
6	Tse Mang Chi	Hong Kong	11.65	11.70	11.69	11.85	11.93	12.15	12.15	
7	Cheung Lai Yee	Hong Kong	x	x	11.80	12.01	11.98	11.70	12.01	

=== Shot put ===
18 February

Rank	Name	Nationality	#1	#2	#3	#4	#5	#6	Result	Notes
1st place, gold medalist(s)	Liu Xiangrong	China	17.60	17.78	18.34	x	18.05	18.37	18.37	CR
2nd place, silver medalist(s)	Leila Rajabi	Iran	16.89	17.51	x	17.10	17.43	17.51	17.51	
3rd place, bronze medalist(s)	Meng Qianqian	China	15.54	x	16.13	15.95	x	x	16.13	
4	Li Wen-hua	Chinese Taipei	13.65	13.61	13.17	13.08	13.80	x	13.80	

=== Pentathlon ===
February 19

The highest mark recorded in each event is highlighted in yellow

Rank	Athlete	Nationality	60m H	HJ	SP	LJ	800m	Points	Notes
1st place, gold medalist(s)	Irina Karpova	Kazakhstan	8.89	1.71	12.26	5.93	2:26.0	4050	
2nd place, silver medalist(s)	Duong Thi Viet Anh	Vietnam	8.99	1.83	10.10	5.82	2:41.7	3812	NR
3rd place, bronze medalist(s)	Sepeide Tavakoli	Iran	9.09	1.71	11.09	5.34	2:24.6	3775	
4	Chu Chia-ling	Chinese Taipei	8.92	1.68	10.77	5.51	2:42.3	3586	
5	Niksy Joseph	India	9.37	1.59	9.33	5.42	2:24.4	3486	
6	Navpreet Kaur	India	9.13	1.62	10.52	4.78	2:27.2	3434	
