= 2015 Asian Athletics Championships – Women's 100 metres =

The women's 100 metres at the 2015 Asian Athletics Championships was held on the 3 and 4 of June.

== Medalists ==
Gold	Chisato Fukushima; Japan
Silver	Viktoriya Zyabkina; Kazakhstan
Bronze	Wei Yongli; China

== Results ==
=== Heats ===
First 3 in each heat (Q) and the next 4 fastest (q) advanced to the semifinals.

Wind:
Heat 1: -0.2 m/s, Heat 2: -0.9 m/s, Heat 3: -1.0 m/s, Heat 4: -0.6 m/s

Rank	Heat	Name	Nationality	Time	Notes
1	4	Chisato Fukushima	Japan	11.46	Q
2	1	Wei Yongli	China	11.58	Q
3	3	Olga Safronova	Kazakhstan	11.64	Q
4	2	Viktoriya Zyabkina	Kazakhstan	11.67	Q
5	4	Kim Min-ji	South Korea	11.78	Q
6	1	Srabani Nanda	India	11.84	Q
7	2	Yuan Qiqi	China	11.86	Q
8	2	Rumeshika Rathnayake	Sri Lanka	11.87	Q
9	4	Tao Yujia	China	11.92	Q
10	3	Mayumi Watanabe	Japan	12.01	Q
11	3	Diana Agliulina	Uzbekistan	12.09	Q
12	2	Valentina Meredova	Turkmenistan	12.11	q
13	1	Kang Da-seul	South Korea	12.12	Q
13	4	Wanwisa Kongthong	Thailand	12.12	q
15	1	Aziza Sbaity	Lebanon	12.13	q
16	1	Hajar Saad Al-Khaldi	Bahrain	12.20	q
17	4	Lam On Ki	Hong Kong	12.29	
18	3	Lê Thị Mộng Tuyền	Vietnam	12.30	
19	2	Sureewan Runan	Thailand	12.41	
20	3	Chan Pui Kei	Hong Kong	12.42	
21	2	Le Tu Chinh	Vietnam	12.61	
22	3	Ieong Loi	Macau	12.64	
23	4	Afa Ismail	Maldives	12.96	
24	1	Shirin Akter	Bangladesh	12.99	

=== Semifinals ===
First 3 in each semifinal (Q) and the next 2 fastest (q) advanced to the final.

Wind:
Heat 1: +0.7 m/s, Heat 2: +1.4 m/s

Rank	Heat	Name	Nationality	Time	Notes
1	2	Chisato Fukushima	Japan	11.28	Q
2	2	Viktoriya Zyabkina	Kazakhstan	11.45	Q
3	1	Wei Yongli	China	11.50	Q
4	1	Olga Safronova	Kazakhstan	11.53	Q
5	1	Srabani Nanda	India	11.61	Q
6	2	Rumeshika Rathnayake	Sri Lanka	11.72	Q
7	2	Kim Min-ji	South Korea	11.72	q
8	2	Tao Yujia	China	11.81	q
9	1	Mayumi Watanabe	Japan	11.84	
10	2	Yuan Qiqi	China	11.90	
11	2	Valentina Meredova	Turkmenistan	11.91	
12	1	Wanwisa Kongthong	Thailand	12.03	
13	1	Diana Agliulina	Uzbekistan	12.06	
13	2	Hajar Saad Al-Khaldi	Bahrain	12.06	
15	1	Aziza Sbaity	Lebanon	12.11	
16	1	Kang Da-seul	South Korea	12.15	

=== Final ===
Wind: +2.5 m/s

Rank	Lane	Name	Nationality	Result	Notes
1st place, gold medalist(s)	6	Chisato Fukushima	Japan	11.23	
2nd place, silver medalist(s)	4	Viktoriya Zyabkina	Kazakhstan	11.34	
3rd place, bronze medalist(s)	5	Wei Yongli	China	11.46	
4	7	Olga Safronova	Kazakhstan	11.47	
5	8	Srabani Nanda	India	11.48	
6	9	Rumeshika Rathnayake	Sri Lanka	11.56	
7	2	Tao Yujia	China	11.66	
8	3	Kim Min-ji	South Korea	11.80	
