= Athletics at the 2014 Asian Games – Women's 100 metres =

Women's 100 metres at the 2014 Asian Games
- Venue: Incheon Asiad Main Stadium
- Dates: 27–28 September 2014
- Competitors: 20 from 14 nations

Medalists
gold medal	Wei Yongli	China
silver medal	Chisato Fukushima	Japan
bronze medal	Olga Safronova	Kazakhstan

The women's 100 metres event at the 2014 Asian Games was held at the Incheon Asiad Main Stadium, Incheon, South Korea on 27–28 September.

== Schedule ==
All times are Korea Standard Time (UTC+09:00)

Date	Time	Event
Saturday, 27 September 2014	18:30	Round 1
Sunday, 28 September 2014	20:50	Final

== Records ==
Prior to this competition, the existing world, Asian and Games records were as follows.

World Record	Florence Griffith Joyner (USA)	10.49	Indianapolis, United States	16 July 1988
Asian Record	Li Xuemei (CHN)	10.79	Shanghai, China	18 October 1997
Games Record	Susanthika Jayasinghe (SRI)	11.15	Busan, South Korea	8 October 2002

== Results ==
=== Round 1 ===
- Qualification: First 2 in each heat (Q) and the next 2 fastest (q) advance to the final.

==== Heat 1 ====
- Wind: −0.3 m/s

Rank	Athlete	Time	Notes
1	Chisato Fukushima (JPN)	11.49	Q
2	Wei Yongli (CHN)	11.53	Q
3	Lee Sun-ae (KOR)	11.98	
4	Khanrutai Pakdee (THA)	12.19	
5	Fong Yee Pui (HKG)	12.43	
6	Mazoon Al-Alawi (OMA)	12.63	

==== Heat 2 ====
- Wind: −0.6 m/s

Rank	Athlete	Time	Notes
1	Olga Safronova (KAZ)	11.44	Q
2	Yuan Qiqi (CHN)	11.55	Q
3	Maryam Tousi (IRI)	11.70	q
4	Shanti Pereira (SIN)	12.02	
5	Walentina Meredowa (TKM)	12.06	
6	Lam On Ki (HKG)	12.34	
7	Ieong Loi (MAC)	12.62	

==== Heat 3 ====
- Wind: −0.5 m/s

Rank	Athlete	Time	Notes
1	Viktoriya Zyabkina (KAZ)	11.51	Q
2	Vũ Thị Hương (VIE)	11.69	Q
3	Tassaporn Wannakit (THA)	11.82	q
4	Kang Da-seul (KOR)	11.85	
5	Sharadha Narayana (IND)	12.04	
6	Hajar Al-Khaldi (BRN)	12.09	
7	Shinoona Al-Habsi (OMA)	12.76	

=== Final ===
- Wind: −0.5 m/s

Rank	Athlete	Time	Notes
1st place, gold medalist(s)	Wei Yongli (CHN)	11.48	
2nd place, silver medalist(s)	Chisato Fukushima (JPN)	11.49	
3rd place, bronze medalist(s)	Olga Safronova (KAZ)	11.50	
4	Viktoriya Zyabkina (KAZ)	11.67	
5	Vũ Thị Hương (VIE)	11.68	
6	Yuan Qiqi (CHN)	11.68	
7	Maryam Tousi (IRI)	11.73	
8	Tassaporn Wannakit (THA)	11.76	
