= Athletics at the 2008 Summer Olympics – Women's 100 metres =

Women's 100 metres at the Games of the XXIX Olympiad
- Venue: Beijing National Stadium
- Dates: August 16 (heats); August 17 (semifinal and final)
- Competitors: 85 from 69 nations
- Winning time: 10.78 s

Medalists
1st place, gold medalist(s)		Shelly-Ann Fraser	Jamaica
2nd place, silver medalist(s)		Sherone Simpson	Jamaica
2nd place, silver medalist(s)		Kerron Stewart	Jamaica

The Women's 100 metres at the 2008 Summer Olympics took place on August 16 (heats) and 17 (final) at the Beijing National Stadium.

The qualifying standards for the 2008 event were 11.32 s (A standard) and 11.42 s (B standard).

Jamaica dominated the event with athlete Shelly-Ann Fraser-Pryce taking the gold and Sherone Simpson and Kerron Stewart taking the silver. Officially, no bronze medal was awarded as Simpson and Stewart finished with an equal time of 10.98 seconds in the second place. Taking all three medals, it was a Jamaican sweep.

The winning margin was 0.20 seconds. The winner had the sixth fastest reaction time in the final.

== Records ==
Prior to this competition, the existing world record, Olympic record, and world leading time were as follows:

World record	Florence Griffith-Joyner (USA)	10.49 s	Indianapolis, United States	16 July 1988
Olympic record	Florence Griffith-Joyner (USA)	10.62 s	Seoul, South Korea	24 September 1988
World Leading	Torri Edwards (USA)	10.78 s	Eugene, Oregon, United States	28 July 2008

No new world or Olympic records were set for this event.

== Results ==
All times shown are in seconds.

=== Heats ===
Qualification: First 3 in each heat (Q) and the next 10 fastest (q) advance to the quarterfinals.

Rank	Heat	Athlete	Country	Time	Notes
1	8	Oludamola Osayomi	Nigeria	11.13	Q
2	8	Debbie Ferguson	Bahamas	11.17	Q
3	8	Daria Korczyńska	Poland	11.22	Q, PB
4	9	Evgeniya Polyakova	Russia	11.24	Q
5	1	Torri Edwards	United States	11.26	Q
6	10	Kerron Stewart	Jamaica	11.28	Q
7	1	Jeanette Kwakye	Great Britain	11.30	Q
7	4	Chandra Sturrup	Bahamas	11.30	Q
9	10	Ezinne Okparaebo	Norway	11.32	Q, NR
10	5	Kim Gevaert	Belgium	11.33	Q
10	7	Ivet Lalova	Bulgaria	11.33	Q
10	3	Muna Lee	United States	11.33	Q
13	6	Shelly-Ann Fraser	Jamaica	11.35	Q
14	7	Montell Douglas	Great Britain	11.36	Q
15	2	Christine Arron	France	11.37	Q
16	2	Lauryn Williams	United States	11.38	Q
17	4	Kelly Ann Baptiste	Trinidad and Tobago	11.39	Q
17	8	Yomara Hinestroza	Colombia	11.39	q
19	5	Yuliya Nestsiarenka	Belarus	11.40	Q
20	10	Laverne Jones-Ferrette	Virgin Islands	11.41	Q
21	4	Lina Grincikaite	Lithuania	11.43	Q
21	3	Anita Pistone	Italy	11.43	Q
23	3	Guzel Khubbieva	Uzbekistan	11.44	Q
24	7	Virgen Benavides	Cuba	11.45	Q, SB
25	9	Jade Bailey	Barbados	11.46	Q
25	2	Tahesia Harrigan	British Virgin Islands	11.46	Q, SB
27	6	Vida Anim	Ghana	11.47	Q
28	3	Virgil Hodge	Saint Kitts and Nevis	11.48	q
28	9	Sherone Simpson	Jamaica	11.48	Q
30	10	Barbara Pierre	Haiti	11.52	q
31	4	Semoy Hackett	Trinidad and Tobago	11.53	q
32	10	Natalya Murinovich	Russia	11.55	q
32	8	Sasha Springer-Jones	Trinidad and Tobago	11.55	q, SB
34	2	Lucimar de Moura	Brazil	11.60	q
34	9	Nataliya Pohrebnyak	Ukraine	11.60	q
36	7	Franca Idoko	Nigeria	11.61	q
36	3	Natalia Rusakova	Russia	11.61	q
38	6	Ruddy Zang Milama	Gabon	11.62	Q
39	1	Myriam Leonie Mani	Cameroon	11.64	Q
40	2	Sherry Fletcher	Grenada	11.65	
40	6	Laura Turner	Great Britain	11.65	
40	5	Thi Huong Vu	Vietnam	11.65	Q
43	1	Inna Eftimova	Bulgaria	11.67	
44	8	Mae Koime	Papua New Guinea	11.68	
45	9	Tezdzhan Naimova	Bulgaria	11.70	
46	5	Halimat Ismaila	Nigeria	11.72	
47	5	Chisato Fukushima	Japan	11.74	
48	4	Affoué Amandine Allou	Ivory Coast	11.75	
49	7	Pia Tajnikar	Slovenia	11.82	
49	9	Jutamass Thavoncharoen	Thailand	11.82	SB
51	1	Wang Jing	China	11.87	
52	7	Ahamada Feta	Comoros	11.88	
53	4	Valentina Nazarova	Turkmenistan	11.94	
54	5	Sonia Williams	Antigua and Barbuda	12.04	
55	6	Nirinaharifidy Ramilijaona	Madagascar	12.07	
56	6	Tamicka Clarke	Bahamas	12.16	
57	10	Charlene Attard	Malta	12.20	
58	7	Fatou Tiyana	The Gambia	12.25	PB
59	2	Dana Abdulrazak	Iraq	12.36	PB
60	3	Kin Yee Wan	Hong Kong	12.37	
61	2	Sadaf Siddiqui	Pakistan	12.41	
62	7	Beauty Nazmun Nahar	Bangladesh	12.52	
63	10	Michaela Kargbo	Sierra Leone	12.54	
64	8	Hiniksia Albertine Ndikert	Chad	12.55	
65	8	Franka Magali	Democratic Republic of the Congo	12.57	PB
66	10	Milena Milasevic	Montenegro	12.65	
67	6	Montserrat Pujol	Andorra	12.73	
68	1	Ani Khachikyan	Armenia	12.76	
69	1	Ivana Rozhman	Macedonia	12.92	
70	4	Titlinda Sou	Cambodia	12.98	PB
71	3	Gharid Ghrouf	Palestine	13.07	NR
72	6	Jessica Aguilera	Nicaragua	13.15	
72	10	Chandra Kala Thapa	Nepal	13.15	
74	1	Peoria Koshiba	Palau	13.18	
75	6	Pauline Kwalea	Solomon Islands	13.28	PB
76	5	Cora Alicto	Guam	13.31	PB
76	3	Elis Lapenmal	Vanuatu	13.31	
78	9	Waseelah Saad	Yemen	13.60	NR
79	3	Bounkou Camara	Mauritania	13.69	
80	9	Maria Ikelap	Federated States of Micronesia	13.73	SB
81	9	Philaylack Sackpaseuth	Laos	13.86	
82	1	Buthaina Al-Yaqoubi	Oman	13.90	
83	2	Asenate Manoa	Tuvalu	14.05	NR
84	4	Fathia Ali Bourrale	Djibouti	14.29	
85	5	Robina Muqimyar	Afghanistan	14.80	

=== Quarterfinals ===
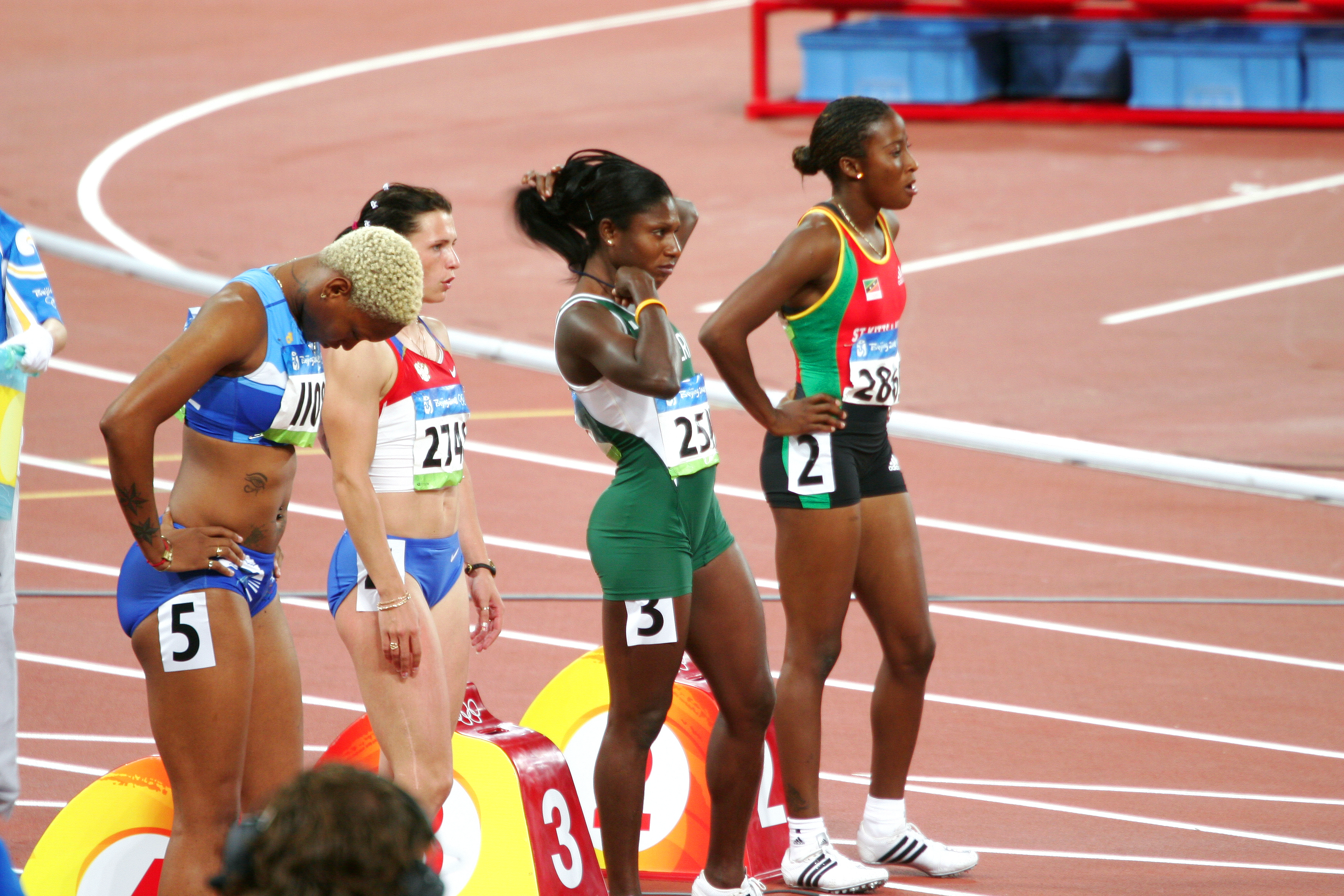
Women's 100m Round 2 - Heat 1

Qualification: First 3 in each heat (Q) and the next 1 fastest (q) advance to the Semifinals.

Rank	Heat	Athlete	Country	Time	Notes
1	4	Kerron Stewart	Jamaica	10.98	Q
2	2	Sherone Simpson	Jamaica	11.02	Q
3	1	Shelly-Ann Fraser	Jamaica	11.06	Q
4	4	Lauryn Williams	United States	11.07	Q
5	2	Muna Lee	United States	11.08	Q
6	4	Kim Gevaert	Belgium	11.10	Q
7	1	Yevgeniya Polyakova	Russia	11.13	Q, SB
8	4	Yulia Nestsiarenka	Belarus	11.14	q, SB
9	2	Chandra Sturrup	Bahamas	11.16	Q
10	1	Jeanette Kwakye	Great Britain	11.18	Q, PB
11	3	Debbie Ferguson	Bahamas	11.21	Q
12	3	Oludamola Osayomi	Nigeria	11.28	Q
13	5	Torri Edwards	United States	11.31	Q
14	3	Vida Anim	Ghana	11.32	Q
15	5	Lina Grincikaite	Lithuania	11.33	Q, PB
16	3	Christine Arron	France	11.36	
16	4	Tahesia Harrigan	British Virgin Islands	11.36	SB
18	2	Montell Douglas	Great Britain	11.38	
19	2	Virgen Benavides	Cuba	11.40	SB
19	5	Ivet Lalova	Bulgaria	11.40	Q
21	3	Daria Korczyńska	Poland	11.41	
22	2	Kelly-Ann Baptiste	Trinidad and Tobago	11.42	
23	1	Virgil Hodge	Saint Kitts and Nevis	11.45	
23	5	Ezinne Okparaebo	Norway	11.45	
25	4	Semoy Hackett	Trinidad and Tobago	11.46	
26	4	Guzel Khubbieva	Uzbekistan	11.49	
26	3	Natalia Rusakova	Russia	11.49	
28	2	Natalya Murinovich	Russia	11.51	
29	1	LaVerne Jones-Ferrette	Virgin Islands	11.55	
29	2	Nataliya Pohrebnyak	Ukraine	11.55	
31	5	Barbara Pierre	Haiti	11.56	
31	5	Anita Pistone	Italy	11.56	
33	5	Ruddy Zang Milama	Gabon	11.59	
34	1	Myriam Léonie Mani	Cameroon	11.65	
35	3	Yomara Hinestroza	Colombia	11.66	
35	1	Ene Franca Idoko	Nigeria	11.66	
37	1	Jade Bailey	Barbados	11.67	
37	4	Lucimar Aparecida de Moura	Brazil	11.67	
39	3	Vu Thi Huong	Vietnam	11.70	
40	5	Sasha Springer	Trinidad and Tobago	11.71	

=== Semifinals ===
Qualification rule: First 4 in each heat (Q) advance to the final.

==== Semifinal 1 ====
Rank	Lane	Athlete	Nation	Reaction	Time	Notes
1	6	Shelly-Ann Fraser	Jamaica	0.217	11.00	Q
2	4	Muna Lee	United States	0.155	11.06	Q
3	7	Lauryn Williams	United States	0.174	11.10	Q
4	5	Sherone Simpson	Jamaica	0.166	11.11	Q
5	9	Chandra Sturrup	Bahamas	0.159	11.22	
6	8	Lina Grinčikaitė	Lithuania	0.163	11.50	
7	3	Ivet Lalova	Bulgaria	0.171	11.51	
7	2	Vida Anim	Ghana	0.189	11.51	
				Wind: –0.7 m/s		

==== Semifinal 2 ====
Rank	Lane	Athlete	Nation	Reaction	Time	Notes
1	7	Kerron Stewart	Jamaica	0.202	11.05	Q
2	4	Torri Edwards	United States	0.174	11.18	Q
3	3	Jeanette Kwakye	Great Britain	0.156	11.19	Q
4	6	Debbie Ferguson-McKenzie	Bahamas	0.184	11.22	Q
5	1	Yuliya Nestsiarenka	Belarus	0.156	11.26	
6	8	Kim Gevaert	Belgium	0.194	11.30	
7	5	Evgeniya Polyakova	Russia	0.173	11.38	
8	9	Oludamola Osayomi	Nigeria	0.208	11.44	
				Wind: –0.2 m/s		

=== Final ===
Rank	Lane	Athlete	Nation	Reaction	Time	Notes
1st place, gold medalist(s)	4	Shelly-Ann Fraser	Jamaica	0.190	10.78	PB
2nd place, silver medalist(s)	2	Sherone Simpson	Jamaica	0.155	10.98	
2nd place, silver medalist(s)	7	Kerron Stewart	Jamaica	0.232	10.98	
4	8	Lauryn Williams	United States	0.149	11.03	
5	5	Muna Lee	United States	0.234	11.07	
6	9	Jeanette Kwakye	Great Britain	0.161	11.14	PB
7	3	Debbie Ferguson	Bahamas	0.167	11.19	
8	6	Torri Edwards	United States	0.179	11.20	
