= 2013 Asian Athletics Championships – Women's 4 × 100 metres relay =

The women's 4 × 100 metres event at the 2013 Asian Athletics Championships was held at the Shree Shiv Chhatrapati Sports Complex on 6 July.

== Results ==
Rank	Nation	Competitors	Time	Notes
1st place, gold medalist(s)	China	Tao Yujia, Lin Huijun, Li Manyuan, Wei Yongli	44.01	
2nd place, silver medalist(s)	Japan	Saori Kitakaze, Mayumi Watanabe, Chisato Fukushima, Anna Fujimori	44.38	
3rd place, bronze medalist(s)	Thailand	Phatsorn Jaksuninkorn, Tassaporn Wannakit, Orranut Klomdee, Jintara Seangdee	44.44	
4	India	S. Sini, Srabani Nanda, Merlin Joseph, Asha Roy	45.03	
5	Hong Kong	Hui Man Ling, Fong Yee Pui, Leung Hau Sze, Lam On Ki	46.28	
