= 2009 Asian Athletics Championships – Women's 100 metres =

The Women's 100 Metres event at the 2009 Asian Athletics Championships was held at the Guangdong Olympic Stadium on November 10–11.

== Medalists ==
Gold	Silver	Bronze
Chisato Fukushima; Japan	Vu Thi Huong; Vietnam	Jyothi Hiriyur Manjunath; India

== Results ==
=== Heats ===
Wind: Heat 1: -0.5 m/s, Heat 2: -0.8 m/s, Heat 3: -1.1 m/s, Heat 4: 0.0 m/s

Rank	Heat	Name	Nationality	Time	Notes
1	1	Chisato Fukushima	Japan	11.37	Q
2	2	Vu Thi Huong	Vietnam	11.70	Q
3	2	Jyothi Hiriyur Manjunath	India	11.72	Q, F1
4	3	Mayumi Watanabe	Japan	11.74	Q
5	1	Tao Yujia	China	11.80	Q
6	3	Guzel Khubbieva	Uzbekistan	11.90	Q
7	4	Pemila Priyadharshani Delapalage	Sri Lanka	12.00	Q
7	1	Le Ngoc Phuong	Vietnam	12.00	Q
9	2	Munira Saleh	Syria	12.04	Q
10	3	Sharadha Narayana	India	12.06	Q
11	4	Lidiya Shahvorostova	Uzbekistan	12.07	Q, F1
12	3	Norjannah Hafiszah Jamaludin	Malaysia	12.13	q
13	4	Leung Hau Sze	Hong Kong	12.15	Q
14	3	Chen Jue	China	12.17	q
15	4	Lee Sun-ae	South Korea	12.20	q
16	1	Jintara Seangdee	Thailand	12.21	q
17	4	Nurul Sarah Abdul Kadir	Malaysia	12.24	
18	3	Achala Shalika Dias	Sri Lanka	12.38	
19	3	Wan Kin Yee	Hong Kong	12.38	
20	1	Lin Yi-chun	Chinese Taipei	12.41	
21	2	Chuang Shu-chuan	Chinese Taipei	12.50	
22	4	Yelena Ryabova	Turkmenistan	12.67	
23	2	Badmaa Batchyy	Mongolia	12.86	
24	2	Io In Chi	Macau	13.25	
25	3	Keshari Chaudhari	Nepal	13.68	
	1	Faten Abdulnabi	Bahrain	DNF	
	1	Dana Al-Khafaji	Iraq	DNF	
	2	Kim Ha-na	South Korea	DQ	F2
	4	Shams-un-nahar	Bangladesh	DNS	

=== Semifinals ===
Wind: Heat 1: 0.0 m/s, Heat 2: +0.8 m/s

Rank	Heat	Name	Nationality	Time	Notes
1	2	Chisato Fukushima	Japan	11.29	Q
2	1	Vu Thi Huong	Vietnam	11.55	Q
3	2	Jyothi Hiriyur Manjunath	India	11.66	Q, F1
4	2	Chen Jue	China	11.71	Q
5	1	Tao Yujia	China	11.72	Q
6	2	Jintara Seangdee	Thailand	11.82	q
6	1	Mayumi Watanabe	Japan	11.82	Q
8	1	Guzel Khubbieva	Uzbekistan	11.84	q
9	2	Le Ngoc Phuong	Vietnam	11.86	
10	2	Pemila Priyadharshani Delapalage	Sri Lanka	11.91	
11	1	Sharadha Narayana	India	11.99	
12	1	Norjannah Hafiszah Jamaludin	Malaysia	12.00	
13	1	Munira Saleh	Syria	12.02	
14	2	Lidiya Shahvorostova	Uzbekistan	12.04	
15	1	Lee Sun-ae	South Korea	12.14	
16	2	Leung Hau Sze	Hong Kong	12.19	

=== Final ===
Wind: -1.0 m/s

Rank	Lane	Name	Nationality	Time	Notes
1st place, gold medalist(s)	4	Chisato Fukushima	Japan	11.27	
2nd place, silver medalist(s)	6	Vu Thi Huong	Vietnam	11.50	
3rd place, bronze medalist(s)	5	Jyothi Hiriyur Manjunath	India	11.60	
4	3	Tao Yujia	China	11.63	
5	7	Mayumi Watanabe	Japan	11.72	
6	8	Chen Jue	China	11.78	
7	1	Jintara Seangdee	Thailand	11.95	
	2	Guzel Khubbieva	Uzbekistan	DNS	
