= 2009 World Championships in Athletics – Women's 100 metres =

Sports competition

The women's 100 metres at the 2009 World Championships in Athletics was held at the Olympic Stadium on August 16 and August 17. The Jamaican team had three strong contenders for the 100 m title in defending champion Veronica Campbell-Brown, Olympic champion Shelly-Ann Fraser, and Kerron Stewart (who ran 10.75 seconds in July; the fastest in nine years). The American squad featured Muna Lee, Lauryn Williams, and an in-form Carmelita Jeter. Other medal contenders are Bahamians Debbie Ferguson-McKenzie and Chandra Sturrup, and Kelly-Ann Baptiste, who have all run under eleven seconds prior to the tournament.

Jeter was the fastest qualifier in the heats, and finished 0.02 seconds outside her personal best to win her quarter-final. Stewart was the fastest in the quarterfinals with 10.92 seconds, and Campbell-Brown won her race as the third athlete to run under eleven seconds that day. On the second day of competition, Shelly-Ann Fraser ran the fastest ever semi-final in 10.79 seconds, with Stewart just behind in 10.84 seconds. Jeter ran a personal best of 10.83 seconds to reach the final, in which half the competitors were Jamaican.

In the final, a quick start saw Fraser lead from the outset of the race and Stewart's late challenge was not enough to beat her compatriot. Stewart's personal-best-equalling 10.75 seconds earned her the silver medal, and Jeter took the bronze with a 10.90 second run, somewhat short of the time she produced in the semi-finals. The 2007 gold and silver medallists ran season's bests but missed out on the medals, with Campbell-Brown in fourth (10.95) and Williams in fifth (11.01). Fraser's win in 10.73 seconds was a Jamaican record and made her the joint third fastest 100 m athlete ever with Christine Arron. Furthermore, she became only the second woman to win consecutive Olympic and World Championship titles, after Gail Devers. As amazing as her start appeared, Fraser only had the fourth fastest reaction time in the field.

== Medalists ==
Gold	Silver	Bronze
Shelly-Ann Fraser; Jamaica	Kerron Stewart; Jamaica	Carmelita Jeter; United States

== Records ==
Prior to the competition, the following records were as follows.

World record	Florence Griffith Joyner (USA)	10.49	Indianapolis, United States	16 July 1988
Championship record	Marion Jones (USA)	10.70	Seville, Spain	22 August 1999
World leading	Kerron Stewart (JAM)	10.75	Rome, Italy	10 July 2009
African record	Glory Alozie (NGR)	10.90	La Laguna, Spain	5 June 1999
Asian record	Li Xuemei (CHN)	10.79	Shanghai, China	18 October 1997
North American record	Florence Griffith Joyner (USA)	10.49	Indianapolis, United States	16 July 1988
South American record	Lucimar de Moura (BRA)	11.17	Bogotá, Colombia	25 June 1999
European record	Christine Arron (FRA)	10.73	Budapest, Hungary	19 August 1998
Oceanian record	Melinda Gainsford-Taylor (AUS)	11.12	Sestriere, Italy	31 July 1994

== Qualification standards ==
A time	B time
11.30	11.40

== Schedule ==
Date	Time	Round
August 16, 2009	11:55	Heats
August 16, 2009	18:35	Quarterfinals
August 17, 2009	19:05	Semifinals
August 17, 2009	21:35	Final

== Results ==
KEY:	q	Fastest non-qualifiers	Q	Qualified	NR	National record	PB	Personal best	SB	Seasonal best

=== Heats ===
Qualification: First 3 in each heat(Q) and the next 5 fastest(q) advance to the quarterfinals.

Rank	Heat	Name	Nationality	Time	Notes
1	3	Carmelita Jeter	United States	11.22	Q
2	4	Debbie Ferguson-McKenzie	Bahamas	11.26	Q
3	8	Chandra Sturrup	Bahamas	11.28	Q
4	5	Aleen Bailey	Jamaica	11.29	Q
4	4	Verena Sailer	Germany	11.29	Q
6	2	Kerron Stewart	Jamaica	11.31	Q
7	6	Veronica Campbell-Brown	Jamaica	11.34	Q
8	6	Ezinne Okparaebo	Norway	11.35	Q
9	7	Lauryn Williams	United States	11.36	Q
9	6	Semoy Hackett	Trinidad and Tobago	11.36	Q
11	2	Vida Anim	Ghana	11.38	Q
12	7	Tahesia Harrigan	British Virgin Islands	11.39	Q
13	1	Lucimar de Moura	Brazil	11.41	Q
13	1	Shelly-Ann Fraser	Jamaica	11.41	Q
13	5	Yevgeniya Polyakova	Russia	11.41	Q
16	9	Kelly-Ann Baptiste	Trinidad and Tobago	11.42	Q
17	9	Muna Lee	United States	11.44	Q
18	5	Myriam Soumaré	France	11.45	Q
19	8	Anna Geflikh	Russia	11.47	Q
19	3	Virgil Hodge	Saint Kitts and Nevis	11.47	Q
19	9	Eleni Artymata	Cyprus	11.47	Q
22	2	Ivet Lalova	Bulgaria	11.48	Q, SB
23	3	Roqaya Al-Gassra	Bahrain	11.49	Q, SB
23	4	Oludamola Osayomi	Nigeria	11.49	Q
23	1	Marion Wagner	Germany	11.49	Q
26	2	Chisato Fukushima	Japan	11.52	q
27	7	Nataliya Pohrebnyak	Ukraine	11.54	Q
27	5	Ayanna Hutchinson	Trinidad and Tobago	11.54	q
29	6	Sheniqua Ferguson	Bahamas	11.57	q
30	1	Yomara Hinestroza	Colombia	11.61	q
31	8	Guzel Khubbieva	Uzbekistan	11.63	Q
32	4	Sónia Tavares	Portugal	11.64	q
32	3	Carol Rodríguez	Puerto Rico	11.64	
34	3	Halimat Ismaila	Nigeria	11.74	
34	1	Ruddy Zang Milama	Gabon	11.74	
36	7	Momoko Takahashi	Japan	11.75	
37	6	Gloria Diogo	São Tomé and Príncipe	11.78	
38	2	Ahamada Feta	Comoros	11.80	
39	9	Courtney Patterson	U.S. Virgin Islands	11.88	
39	9	Pia Tajnikar	Slovenia	11.88	
41	8	Serafi Anelies Unani	Indonesia	12.05	PB
42	3	Yah Soucko Koïta	Mali	12.16	SB
43	2	Fatou Tiyana	Gambia	12.22	PB
44	5	Ani Khachikyan	Armenia	12.30	SB
44	1	Balpreet Kaur Purba	Singapore	12.30	SB
46	2	Dana Hussein Abdul-Razzaq	Iraq	12.38	SB
47	4	Ivana Rožman	Macedonia	12.60	
48	5	Alice Khan	Seychelles	12.64	PB
49	7	Martina Pretelli	San Marino	12.65	
50	7	Terani Faremiro	French Polynesia	12.96	PB
51	8	Elis Lapenmal	Vanuatu	13.11	SB
52	5	Mariama Bah	Guinea	13.33	PB
53	6	Philaylack Sackpaseuth	Laos	13.42	PB
53	3	Rosa Mystique Jones	Nauru	13.42	SB
55	9	Pauline Kwalea	Solomon Islands	13.67	SB
56	4	Sorai Bella Reklai	Palau	13.75	PB
56	6	Asenate Manoa	Tuvalu	13.75	NR
58	9	Beatriz Mangue	Equatorial Guinea	14.03	
59	8	Savannah Sanitoa	American Samoa	14.23	SB
60	4	Robina Muqimyar	Afghanistan	14.24	SB
61	7	Tioiti Katutu	Kiribati	14.38	PB
	1	Yvonne Bennett	Northern Mariana Islands	DNS	
	8	Blessing Okagbare	Nigeria	DNS	

=== Quarterfinals ===
Qualification: First 3 in each heat(Q) and the next 4 fastest(q) advance to the semifinals.

Rank	Heat	Name	Nationality	Time	Notes
1	1	Kerron Stewart	Jamaica	10.92	Q
2	4	Carmelita Jeter	United States	10.94	Q
3	3	Veronica Campbell-Brown	Jamaica	10.99	Q
4	4	Shelly-Ann Fraser	Jamaica	11.02	Q
5	4	Kelly-Ann Baptiste	Trinidad and Tobago	11.05	Q
6	2	Lauryn Williams	United States	11.06	Q, SB
6	1	Chandra Sturrup	Bahamas	11.06	Q
8	3	Debbie Ferguson-McKenzie	Bahamas	11.08	Q
9	2	Aleen Bailey	Jamaica	11.12	Q
10	3	Muna Lee	United States	11.13	Q, SB
11	2	Tahesia Harrigan	British Virgin Islands	11.21	Q
12	3	Verena Sailer	Germany	11.26	q
13	2	Vida Anim	Ghana	11.34	q
14	1	Semoy Hackett	Trinidad and Tobago	11.37	Q
14	2	Eleni Artymata	Cyprus	11.37	q, PB
16	2	Ayanna Hutchinson	Trinidad and Tobago	11.40	q
17	1	Guzel Khubbieva	Uzbekistan	11.43	
17	2	Chisato Fukushima	Japan	11.43	
19	4	Lucimar de Moura	Brazil	11.44	
19	1	Ezinne Okparaebo	Norway	11.44	
21	2	Myriam Soumaré	France	11.45	
22	3	Anna Geflikh	Russia	11.46	
23	3	Nataliya Pohrebnyak	Ukraine	11.49	
24	4	Virgil Hodge	Saint Kitts and Nevis	11.51	
24	3	Roqaya Al-Gassra	Bahrain	11.51	
26	1	Yevgeniya Polyakova	Russia	11.52	
27	1	Ivet Lalova	Bulgaria	11.54	
28	4	Oludamola Osayomi	Nigeria	11.55	
28	3	Sónia Tavares	Portugal	11.55	
30	4	Sheniqua Ferguson	Bahamas	11.59	
31	4	Marion Wagner	Germany	11.64	
32	1	Yomara Hinestroza	Colombia	11.76	

=== Semifinals ===
First 4 of each Semifinal qualified directly (Q) for the final.

==== Semifinal 1 ====
Rank	Lane	Name	Nationality	React	Time	Notes
1	6	Shelly-Ann Fraser	Jamaica	0.156	10.79	Q, SB
2	4	Kerron Stewart	Jamaica	0.155	10.84	Q
3	5	Lauryn Williams	United States	0.148	11.01	Q, SB
4	3	Debbie Ferguson-McKenzie	Bahamas	0.146	11.03	Q
5	7	Kelly-Ann Baptiste	Trinidad and Tobago	0.141	11.07	
6	2	Verena Sailer	Germany	0.149	11.24	
7	8	Tahesia Harrigan	British Virgin Islands	0.146	11.34	
8	1	Ayanna Hutchinson	Trinidad and Tobago	0.169	11.58	

==== Semifinal 2 ====
Rank	Lane	Name	Nationality	React	Time	Notes
1	4	Carmelita Jeter	United States	0.144	10.83	Q, PB
2	3	Veronica Campbell-Brown	Jamaica	0.148	11.00	Q
3	5	Chandra Sturrup	Bahamas	0.127	11.01	Q
4	6	Aleen Bailey	Jamaica	0.199	11.16	Q
5	8	Muna Lee	United States	0.179	11.18	
6	1	Vida Anim	Ghana	0.125	11.43	
7	7	Semoy Hackett	Trinidad and Tobago	0.131	11.45	
8	2	Eleni Artymata	Cyprus	0.164	11.49	

=== Final ===
Rank	Lane	Name	Nationality	React	Time	Notes
1st place, gold medalist(s)	3	Shelly-Ann Fraser	Jamaica	0.146	10.73	WL, NR
2nd place, silver medalist(s)	4	Kerron Stewart	Jamaica	0.170	10.75	=PB
3rd place, bronze medalist(s)	5	Carmelita Jeter	United States	0.160	10.90	
4	6	Veronica Campbell-Brown	Jamaica	0.135	10.95	SB
5	8	Lauryn Williams	United States	0.158	11.01	SB
6	2	Debbie Ferguson-McKenzie	Bahamas	0.130	11.05	
7	7	Chandra Sturrup	Bahamas	0.137	11.05	
8	1	Aleen Bailey	Jamaica	0.173	11.16	
