= 2017 IAAF World Relays – Women's 4 × 100 metres relay =

Women's 4 × 100 metres relay at the 2017 IAAF World Relays
- Venue: Thomas Robinson Stadium
- Dates: 23 April (heats & final)
- Competitors: 59 from 14 nations
- Winning time: 42.14

Medalists
gold medal	Alexandra Burghardt; Lisa Mayer; Tatjana Pinto; Rebekka Haase	Germany
silver medal	Simone Facey; Natasha Morrison; Gayon Evans; Sashalee Forbes; Christania Williams*	Jamaica
bronze medal	Liang Xiaojing; Wei Yongli; Tao Yujia; Yuan Qiqi; Ge Manqi*	China

The women's 4 × 100 metres relay at the 2017 IAAF World Relays was held at the Thomas Robinson Stadium on 23 April.

In the final, USA's Tianna Bartoletta started strongly in lane 3, gaining vs the stagger against Jamaica's Simone Facey who was also gaining on Germany's Alexandra Burghardt. Approaching the first handoff, as Bartoletta passed Brazil's Tânia da Silva waiting in lane 2, Bartoletta lost her balance and crashed to the track. Da Silva, who was standing in her own lane, was also set off balance, neither USA or Brazil completed their handoff. The incident seem to echo from the situation between the same two teams at the previous year's Olympics. China's clean first handoff between Liang Xiaojing and Wei Yongli put them into the lead, while Germany's handoff to Lisa Mayer and Jamaica's handoff to Natasha Morrison were hesitant but effective. Netherlands put their star world champion Dafne Schippers on the second leg. She rocketed past Wei and put her team into the lead, but after handing off to Madiea Ghafoor, the momentum stopped as China's Tao Yujia rapidly went by. Inside of them, Germany's Tatjana Pinto ran an exceptional leg, separating from Jamaica's Gayon Evans, Germany passing first to Rebekka Haase with Jamaica's pass to Sashalee Forbes also gaining an edge on China's handoff to Yuan Qiqi. Free to run, Hasse separated an extra metre from Forbes, who then found her gear and closed back in on Hasse. But Hasse had too much of a lead, Germany beating Jamaica by a metre with China another two back, holding off a fast closing Naomi Sedney for the Netherlands.

== Records ==
Prior to the competition, the records were as follows:

World record	United States (Tianna Madison, Allyson Felix, Bianca Knight, Carmelita Jeter)	40.82	(United Kingdom) London, Great Britain	10 August 2012
Championship record	United States (Tianna Bartoletta, Alexandria Anderson, Jeneba Tarmoh, LaKeisha Lawson)	41.88	(The Bahamas) Nassau, Bahamas	24 May 2014
World Leading	University of Oregon	42.12	Torrance, United States	15 April 2017
African Record	Nigeria (Beatrice Utondu, Faith Idehen, Christy Opara, Mary Onyali)	42.39	Barcelona, Spain	7 August 1992
Asian Record	China (Xiao Lin, Li Yali, Liu Xiaomei, Li Xuemei)	42.23	Shanghai, China	23 October 1997
North, Central American and Caribbean record	United States (Tianna Madison, Allyson Felix, Bianca Knight, Carmelita Jeter)	40.82	(United Kingdom) London, Great Britain	10 August 2012
South American Record	Brazil (Evelyn dos Santos, Ana Claudia Silva, Franciela Krasucki, Rosângela Santos)	42.29	Moscow, Russia	18 August 2013
European Record	East Germany (Silke Gladisch-Möller, Sabine Rieger-Günther, Ingrid Auerswald-Lange, Marlies Göhr)	41.37	Canberra, Australia	6 October 1985
Oceanian record	Australia (Rachael Massey, Suzanne Broadrick, Jodi Lambert, Melinda Gainsford-Taylor)	42.99	Pietersburg, South Africa	18 March 2000

== Schedule ==
Date	Time	Round
23 April 2017	20:00	Heats
23 April 2017	21:46	Final B
23 April 2017	22:13	Final

All times are local times (UTC-4)

== Results ==
KEY:	Q	Qualified	q	Fastest non-qualifiers	WL	World leading	SB	Seasonal best	WC	2017 World Championships qualification

=== Heats ===
Qualification: First 2 of each heat (Q) plus the 2 fastest times (q) advanced to the final. The next 8 fastest times qualified for the final B.

Rank	Heat	Nation	Athletes	Time	Notes
1	1	United States	Tianna Bartoletta, Jenna Prandini, English Gardner, Morolake Akinosun	42.96	Q
2	2	Germany	Alexandra Burghardt, Lisa Mayer, Tatjana Pinto, Rebekka Haase	43.04	Q, SB
3	2	Jamaica	Simone Facey, Natasha Morrison, Gayon Evans, Christania Williams	43.22	Q
4	1	China	Liang Xiaojing, Wei Yongli, Ge Manqi, Yuan Qiqi	43.90	Q
5	1	Netherlands	Jamile Samuel, Dafne Schippers, Madiea Ghafoor, Naomi Sedney	43.98	Q, SB
6	1	Bahamas	Devine Parker, Brianne Bethel, Tayla Carter, Tynia Gaither	44.11	q, SB
7	2	France	Floriane Gnafoua, Stella Akakpo, Maroussia Paré, Charlotte Jeanne	44.14	Q, SB
8	2	Brazil	Bruna Farias, Tânia da Silva, Vitória Cristina Rosa, Rosângela Santos	44.20	q, SB
9	2	Ecuador	Yuliana Angulo, Narcisa Landazuri, Romina Cifuentes, Ángela Tenorio	44.54	SB
10	1	British Virgin Islands	Nelda Huggins, Tahesia Harrigan-Scott, Ashley Kelly, Karene King	44.78	
11	2	Nigeria	Lindsay Lindley, Patience Okon George, Ugonna Ndu, Jennifer Madu	44.95	SB
12	1	Canada	Farah Jacques, Crystal Emmanuel, Shai-Anne Davis, Shaina Harrison	44.98	SB
	2	Italy	Libania Grenot, Gloria Hooper, Anna Bongiorni, Audrey Alloh	DQ	R163.3(A)
	1	Trinidad and Tobago	Kelly-Ann Baptiste, Michelle-Lee Ahye, Khalifa St. Fort, Semoy Hackett	DNF	

=== Final B ===
Rank	Lane	Nation	Athletes	Time	Notes
1	4	Ecuador	Yuliana Angulo, Narcisa Landazuri, Romina Cifuentes, Ángela Tenorio	44.26	*WC
	3	Canada	Farah Jacques, Crystal Emmanuel, Shai-Anne Davis, Shaina Harrison	DQ	R170.7
	5	British Virgin Islands	Nelda Huggins, Tahesia Harrigan-Scott, Ashley Kelly, Karene King	DNF	
	6	Nigeria		DNS	

=== Final ===
Rank	Lane	Nation	Athletes	Time	Notes	Points
1st place, gold medalist(s)	5	Germany	Alexandra Burghardt, Lisa Mayer, Tatjana Pinto, Rebekka Haase	42.84	WL, *WC	8
2nd place, silver medalist(s)	4	Jamaica	Simone Facey, Natasha Morrison, Gayon Evans, Sashalee Forbes	42.95	SB, *WC	7
3rd place, bronze medalist(s)	6	China	Liang Xiaojing, Wei Yongli, Tao Yujia, Yuan Qiqi	43.11	SB, *WC	6
4	7	Netherlands	Jamile Samuel, Dafne Schippers, Madiea Ghafoor, Naomi Sedney	43.17	SB, *WC	5
5	8	France	Floriane Gnafoua, Stella Akakpo, Charlotte Jeanne, Carolle Zahi	43.90	SB, *WC	4
6	1	Bahamas	Devine Parker, Brianne Bethel, Tayla Carter, Tynia Gaither	44.01	SB, *WC	3
	2	Brazil	Bruna Farias, Tânia da Silva, Vitória Cristina Rosa, Rosângela Santos	DNF		0
	3	United States	Tianna Bartoletta, Jenna Prandini, English Gardner, Morolake Akinosun	DNF		0
