= Mayumi Watanabe =

Japanese sprinter

Personal information
- Born: 6 June 1983 (age 43) Niigata, Japan
- Education: Fukushima University
- Height: 1.64 m (5 ft 5 in)
- Weight: 52 kg (115 lb)

Sport
- Sport: Track and field
- Event(s): 100 m, 200 m
- Retired: October 2015

Achievements and titles
- Personal bests: 60 m: 7.36 NR (2012) 100 m: 11.44 (2011) 200 m: 23.35 (2013)
Medal record
Women's athletics
Representing Japan
Asian Games
Bronze medal – third place	2010 Guangzhou	4×100 m relay
Asian Championships
Gold medal – first place	2009 Guangzhou	4×100 m relay
Silver medal – second place	2009 Guangzhou	4×100 m relay
Bronze medal – third place	2009 Guangzhou	4×400 m relay
East Asian Games
Silver medal – second place	2009 Hong Kong	100 m
Silver medal – second place	2009 Hong Kong	4×100 m relay

Mayumi Watanabe (渡辺 真弓, Watanabe Mayumi; married name Amagaya (天下谷), born 6 June 1983 in Niigata) is a retired Japanese athlete who specialised in sprinting events. She represented her country at the 2007 and 2009 World Championships.

Her personal bests are 11.44 seconds in the 100 metres (+1.7 m/s, Fukushima 2011) and 23.35 seconds in the 200 metres (+0.4 m/s, Fukuroi 2013).

She retired in October 2015. She is currently the coach of Toho Bank Athletics Club.

== Personal bests ==
Event	Time	Competition	Venue	Date	Notes
Individual events
60 m	7.36 (wind: +0.9 m/s)	Fukushima Relays	Fukushima, Japan	20 October 2012	Current NR
100 m	11.44 (wind: +1.7 m/s)	Fukushima Championships	Fukushima, Japan	15 July 2011	
200 m	23.35 (wind: +0.4 m/s)	Shizuoka International Meet	Fukuroi, Japan	3 May 2013	
Relay events
4 × 100 m relay	43.58 (relay leg: 3rd) (Note: National team, with teammates Saori Kitakaze, Chisato Fukushima and Momoko Takahashi)	Osaka Grand Prix	Osaka, Japan	9 May 2009	Former NR (Note: Record was broken by national team in 2011)
4 × 200 m relay	1:35.36 (relay leg: 4th) (Note: Toho Bank team, with teammates Hitomi Shimura, Asami Chiba and Sayaka Aoki)	Fukushima Relays	Fukushima, Japan	17 October 2015	Former NR (Note: Record was broken by national team in 2019)
Medley relay	2:05.81 (relay leg: 2nd) (Note: Corporate select team, with teammates Maki Wada, Asami Chiba and Sayaka Aoki)	JITA-IUAUJ Classic Match	Odawara, Japan	14 October 2012	Current NR

== Competition record ==
Year	Competition	Venue	Position	Event	Notes
Representing Japan
2007	World Championships	Osaka, Japan	–	4 × 100 m relay	DQ
2009	World Championships	Berlin, Germany	14th (h)	4 × 100 m relay	44.24
2009	Asian Championships	Guangzhou, China	5th	100 m	11.72
2009	Asian Championships	Guangzhou, China	1st	4 × 100 m relay	43.93
2009	Asian Championships	Guangzhou, China	3rd	4 × 400 m relay	3:31.95
2009	East Asian Games	Hong Kong, China	2nd	100 m	11.83
2009	East Asian Games	Hong Kong, China	2nd	4 × 100 m relay	44.89
2010	Asian Games	Guangzhou, China	3rd	4 × 100 m relay	44.41
2013	Asian Championships	Pune, India	4th	100 m	11.67
2013	Asian Championships	Pune, India	12th (h)	200 m	24.48
2013	Asian Championships	Pune, India	2nd	4 × 100 m relay	44.38
2014	IAAF World Relays	Nassau, Bahamas	18th (h)	4 × 100 m relay	44.66
2015	IAAF World Relays	Nassau, Bahamas	–	4 × 100 m relay	DQ
2015	Asian Championships	Wuhan, China	9th (sf)	100 m	11.84

== National titles ==
- Japanese Championships
  - 4 × 100 m relay: 2003, 2005, 2007, 2008, 2009, 2010, 2012, 2013, 2014
  - 4 × 400 m relay: 2007, 2009, 2012
