= Yuan Qiqi =

Chinese sprinter (born 1995)

Personal information
- Born: October 26, 1995 (age 30) Zhangjiagang, Jiangsu, China
- Height: 1.55 m (5 ft 1 in)
- Weight: 50 kg (110 lb)

Sport
- Country: China
- Sport: Athletics
- Event: 100 metres
Medal record
Women's athletics
Representing China
Asian Games
Gold medal – first place	2022 Hangzhou	4×100 m relay
Asian Indoor Championships
Silver medal – second place	2016 Doha	60 m

Yuan Qiqi (Chinese: 袁琦琦; born 26 October 1995 in Zhangjiagang, Jiangsu province) is a Chinese athlete who specialises in the sprinting events. She won the silver medal at the 2016 Asian Indoor Championships.

== Competition record ==
Year	Competition	Venue	Position	Event	Notes
Representing China
2013	East Asian Games	Tianjin, China	2nd	200 m	24.15
2013	East Asian Games	Tianjin, China	1st	4 × 100 m relay	43.66
2014	IAAF World Relays	Nassau, Bahamas	13th	4 × 100 m relay	44.09
2014	Asian Junior Championships	Taipei, Taiwan	2nd	100 m	11.64
2014	Asian Junior Championships	Taipei, Taiwan	12th (h)	200 m	25.09
2014	Asian Junior Championships	Taipei, Taiwan	1st	4 × 100 m relay	45.34
2014	Asian Games	Incheon, South Korea	6th	100 m	11.68
2015	IAAF World Relays	Nassau, Bahamas	14th (h)	4 × 100 m relay	44.45
2015	IAAF World Relays	Nassau, Bahamas	4th	4 × 200 m relay	1:34.89
2015	Asian Championships	Wuhan, China	10th (sf)	100 m	11.90
2015	Asian Championships	Wuhan, China	1st	4 × 100 m relay	43.10
2016	Asian Indoor Championships	Doha, Qatar	2nd	60 m	7.33
2016	World Indoor Championships	Portland, United States	32nd (h)	60 m	7.48
2016	Olympic Games	Rio de Janeiro, Brazil	39th (h)	100 m	11.56
2016	Olympic Games	Rio de Janeiro, Brazil	9th (h)	4 × 100 m relay	42.70
2017	IAAF World Relays	Nassau, Bahamas	3rd	4 × 100 m relay	43.11
2017	IAAF World Relays	Nassau, Bahamas	8th	4 × 200 m relay	1:37.60
2018	Asian Games	Jakarta, Indonesia	2nd	4 × 100 m relay	42.84
2023	Asian Championships	Bangkok, Thailand	11th (sf)	200 m	24.00
2023	Asian Championships	Bangkok, Thailand	1st	4 × 100 m relay	43.35
2023	Asian Games	Hangzhou, China	1st	4 × 100 m relay	43.39

== Personal bests ==
Outdoor

- 100 metres – 11.51 (+1.0 m/s, Zhaoqing 2014)
- 200 metres – 23.71 (+0.9 m/s, Shenyang 2013)

Indoor

- 60 metres – 7.30 (Xianlin 2015)
