= Gayon Evans =

Jamaican sprinter (born 1990)

Personal information
- Born: 15 January 1990 (age 36) Manchester Parish, Jamaica
- Education: University of Maryland Eastern Shore
- Height: 1.55 m (5 ft 1 in)
- Weight: 53 kg (117 lb)

Sport
- Sport: Athletics
- Events: 100 m, 200 m
- College team: Maryland Eastern Shore Hawks
Medal record
Commonwealth Games
Silver medal – second place	2018 Gold Coast	4×100 m relay
Bronze medal – third place	2018 Gold Coast	100 m

Gayon Evans (born 15 January 1990) is a Jamaican sprinter. She won a silver medal in the 4 × 100 metres relay at the 2017 IAAF World Relays.

== International competitions ==
Year	Competition	Venue	Position	Event	Notes
Representing Jamaica
2007	World Youth Championships	Ostrava, Czech Republic	25th (h)	100 m	12.17^{1}
2007	World Youth Championships	Ostrava, Czech Republic	2nd	Medley relay	2:06.77
2008	World Junior Championships	Bydgoszcz, Poland	2nd	4 × 100 m relay	43.98
2009	Pan American Junior Championships	Port of Spain, Trinidad and Tobago	6th	100 m	11.71
2009	Pan American Junior Championships	Port of Spain, Trinidad and Tobago	2nd	4 × 100 m relay	44.96
2014	Pan American Sports Festival	Mexico City, Mexico	3rd	100 m	11.72
2014	Central American and Caribbean Games	Xalapa, Mexico	10th (h)	200 m	24.33
2017	World Relays	Nassau, Bahamas	2nd	4 × 100 m relay	42.95
2018	World Indoor Championships	Birmingham, United Kingdom	25th (h)	60 m	7.33^{2}
2018	Commonwealth Games	Gold Coast, Australia	3rd	100 m	11.22
2018	Commonwealth Games	Gold Coast, Australia	2nd	4 × 100 m relay	42.52
2019	World Relays	Yokohama, Japan	2nd	4 × 100 m relay	43.29

^{1}Disqualified in the quarterfinals
^{2}Did not start in the semifinals

== Personal bests ==
Outdoor

- 100 metres – 11.22 (+1.0 m/s, Gold Coast 2018)
- 200 metres – 23.18 (+1.3 m/s, Kingston 2017)
- 400 metres – 55.46 (Annapolis 2014)

Indoor

- 60 metres – 7.14 (Karlsruhe 2017)
- 200 metres – 23.36 (Boston 2014)
- 400 metres – 56.22 (New York 2013)
