= Valentina Meredova =

Turkmenistani athlete

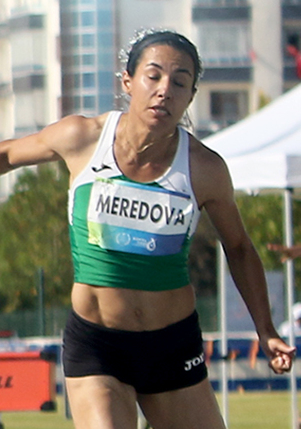

Personal information
- Born: 29 September 1984 (age 41) Ashgabat, Turkmen SSR, Soviet Union
- Height: 1.60 m (5 ft 3 in)
- Weight: 52 kg (115 lb)

Sport
- Sport: Athletics
- Events: 60 metres, 100 metres

Valentina Meredova (née Nazarova; born 29 September 1984) is a Turkmenistani sprinter. She represented Turkmenistan at the 2008 Summer Olympics in Beijing. She competed in the 100 metres and placed sixth in her heat with a time of 11.94 s, without advancing to the second round. She competed in the IAAF World Championships in 2005, 2007 and 2015, never advancing beyond the heats.

== Competition record ==
Year	Competition	Venue	Position	Event	Notes
Representing Turkmenistan
2005	World Championships	Helsinki, Finland	43rd (h)	100 m	12.87
2006	World Indoor Championships	Moscow, Russia	24th (h)	60 m	7.78
2006	Asian Games	Doha, Qatar	15th (h)	100 m	12.31
2007	World Championships	Osaka, Japan	44th (h)	100 m	12.02
2008	World Indoor Championships	Valencia, Spain	30th (h)	60 m	7.72
2008	Olympic Games	Beijing, China	53rd (h)	100 m	11.94
2014	Asian Games	Incheon, South Korea	13th (h)	100 m	12.06
2015	Asian Championships	Wuhan, China	11th (sf)	100 m	11.91
2015	World Championships	Beijing, China	47th (h)	100 m	12.25
2016	Asian Indoor Championships	Doha, Qatar	16th (sf)	60 m	7.74
2016	World Indoor Championships	Portland, United States	40th (h)	60 m	7.89
2017	Islamic Solidarity Games	Baku, Azerbaijan	12th (sf)	100 m	12.03
2017	Asian Indoor and Martial Arts Games	Ashgabat, Turkmenistan	6th	60 m	7.58
2017	Asian Indoor and Martial Arts Games	Ashgabat, Turkmenistan	3rd	4 × 400 m relay	3:50.39
2017	Asian Indoor and Martial Arts Games	Ashgabat, Turkmenistan	7th	Long jump	5.58 m
2018	Asian Indoor Championships	Tehran, Iran	6th	60 m	7.54
2019	Asian Championships	Doha, Qatar	20th (h)	100 m	12.06
2022	Islamic Solidarity Games	Konya, Turkey	13th (sf)	100 m	11.87
2023	Asian Indoor Championships	Astana, Kazakhstan	8th	60 m	7.54
2023	Asian Championships	Bangkok, Thailand	19th (h)	100 m	12.05
2024	Asian Indoor Championships	Tehran, Iran	6th	60 m	7.44
2024	Olympic Games	Paris, France	65th (h)	100 m	11.95
2025	World Indoor Championships	Nanjing, China	39th (h)	60 m	7.68
2025	Asian Championships	Gumi, South Korea	16th (h)	100 m	12.12
2025	World Championships	Tokyo, Japan	56th (h)	100 m	12.13
2026	Asian Indoor Championships	Tianjin, China	11th (h)	60 m	7.61
2026	Asian Indoor Championships	Tianjin, China	12th	Long jump	5.49 m

== Personal bests ==
Outdoor

- 100 metres – 11.56 (+1.7 m/s, Almaty 2008)
- 200 metres – 23.77 (+2.0 m/s, Almaty 2008)

Indoor

- 60 metres – 7.44 (Tehran 2024)
