= Yelena Ryabova =

Turkmenistan short-distance runner

Personal information
- Nationality: Turkmenistan
- Born: 3 November 1990 (age 35)

Sport
- Sport: Athletics
- Event(s): 100 m, 200 m

Achievements and titles
- Personal best(s): 100 m: 12.29 (2011); 200 m: 24.27 (2012)

Yelena Ryabova (Елена Рябова, born November 3, 1990) is a Turkmenistan short-distance runner. She competed for the women's 200 metres in the 2016 Summer Olympics.

== International competitions ==
Year	Competition	Venue	Position	Event	Notes
2009	Asian Athletics Championships	Guangzhou, China	heats	100 m	12.67
2009	Asian Athletics Championships	Guangzhou, China	heats	200 m	26.08
2010	Asian Games	Guangzhou, China	heats	100 m	12.29
2010	Asian Games	Guangzhou, China	heats	200 m	25.33
2011	Asian Athletics Championships	Kobe, Japan	heats	100 m	12.40
2011	Asian Athletics Championships	Kobe, Japan	heats	200 m	25.13
2013	Asian Athletics Championships	Pune, India	—	100 m	DNS
2013	Asian Athletics Championships	Pune, India	—	200 m	DNS
2013	World Championships	Moscow, Russia	heats	200 m	DQ
2017	World Championships	London, United Kingdom	41st (h)	100 m	12.27
2017	Asian Indoor and Martial Arts Games	Ashgabat, Turkmenistan	15th (h)	60 m	7.79
2017	Asian Indoor and Martial Arts Games	Ashgabat, Turkmenistan	3rd	4 × 400 m relay	3:50.39
