= 2005 Asian Athletics Championships – Women's 200 metres =

The women's 200 metres event at the 2005 Asian Athletics Championships was held in Incheon, South Korea on September 3–4.

== Medalists ==
Gold	Silver	Bronze
Damayanthi Dharsha; Sri Lanka	Guzel Khubbieva; Uzbekistan	Ni Xiaoli; China

== Results ==
=== Heats ===
Wind: Heat 1: 0.0 m/s, Heat 2: +0.5 m/s

Rank	Heat	Name	Nationality	Time	Notes
1	1	Damayanthi Dharsha	Sri Lanka	23.66	Q
2	1	Guzel Khubbieva	Uzbekistan	24.14	Q
3	2	Sakie Nobuoka	Japan	24.32	Q
4	1	Jiang Zhiying	China	24.44	Q, SB
5	1	Rina Fujimaki	Japan	24.77	q
6	2	Anna Gavriushenko	Kazakhstan	24.97	Q
7	1	Lee Ji-eun	South Korea	25.13	q
8	2	Ni Xiaoli	China	25.29	Q
9	2	Kim Ha-na	South Korea	25.45	SB
10	1	Leung Hau Sze	Hong Kong	25.66	
11	2	Nursari Hafizzah Matasan	Brunei	25.67	NJR
12	2	Dana Abdulrazak	Iraq	25.77	
13	2	Gretta Taslakian	Lebanon	25.94	SB
14	1	Alaa Hikmat	Iraq	26.17	PB
15	1	Sry Hang	Cambodia	28.32	PB

=== Final ===
Wind: +0.9 m/s

Rank	Name	Nationality	Time	Notes
1st place, gold medalist(s)	Damayanthi Dharsha	Sri Lanka	23.21	SB
2nd place, silver medalist(s)	Guzel Khubbieva	Uzbekistan	23.43	SB
3rd place, bronze medalist(s)	Ni Xiaoli	China	23.58	
4	Sakie Nobuoka	Japan	24.02	
5	Rina Fujimaki	Japan	24.19	
6	Anna Gavriushenko	Kazakhstan	24.46	
7	Jiang Zhiying	China	24.71	
8	Lee Ji-eun	South Korea	24.92	
