= Liao Ching-hsien =

Taiwanese sprinter (born 1994)

Liao Ching-hsien (Chinese: 廖靜賢; pinyin: Liào Jìngxián; born 22 June 1994) is a Taiwanese athlete who specialises in the sprinting events. She represented her country at the 2011 World Championships and 2012 World Indoor Championships.

== Competition record ==
Year	Competition	Venue	Position	Event	Notes
Representing Chinese Taipei
2009	Asian Championships	Guangzhou, China	–	200 m	DQ
2009	Asian Championships	Guangzhou, China	5th	4 × 100 m relay	45.81
2009	East Asian Games	Hong Kong, China	3rd	4 × 400 m relay	3:51.08
2010	Asian Junior Championships	Hanoi, Vietnam	7th (h)	100 m	12.31
2010	Asian Junior Championships	Hanoi, Vietnam	4th	200 m	24.72
2010	Asian Junior Championships	Hanoi, Vietnam	3rd	4 × 100 m relay	45.90
2010	Youth Olympic Games	Singapore	1st (B)	100 m	11.88
2010	Asian Games	Guangzhou, China	12th (sf)	100 m	11.89
2011	Asian Championships	Kobe, Japan	11th (h)	100 m	12.06
2011	Asian Championships	Kobe, Japan	7th	200 m	24.65
2011	World Championships	Daegu, South Korea	41st (h)	100 m	12.15
2012	Asian Indoor Championships	Hangzhou, China	5th	60 m	7.63
2012	World Indoor Championships	Istanbul, Turkey	36th (h)	60 m	7.68
2012	Asian Junior Championships	Colombo, Sri Lanka	1st	100 m	11.97
2012	Asian Junior Championships	Colombo, Sri Lanka	1st (h)	200 m	24.62
2012	Asian Junior Championships	Colombo, Sri Lanka	3rd	4 × 100 m relay	47.32
2013	Universiade	Kazan, Russia	5th	4 × 100 m relay	45.16
2014	Asian Games	Incheon, South Korea	11th (h)	200 m	24.10
2014	Asian Games	Incheon, South Korea	7th	4 × 100 m relay	44.99
2018	Asian Games	Jakarta, Indonesia	6th	4 × 100 m relay	45.19

== Personal bests ==
Outdoor

- 100 metres – 11.84 (+0.9 m/s, Changhua 2011)
- 200 metres – 24.01 (+1.1 m/s, Fuzhou 2011)

Indoor

- 60 metres – 7.58 (Osaka 2012)
