= Wei Yongli =

Chinese sprinter (born 1991)

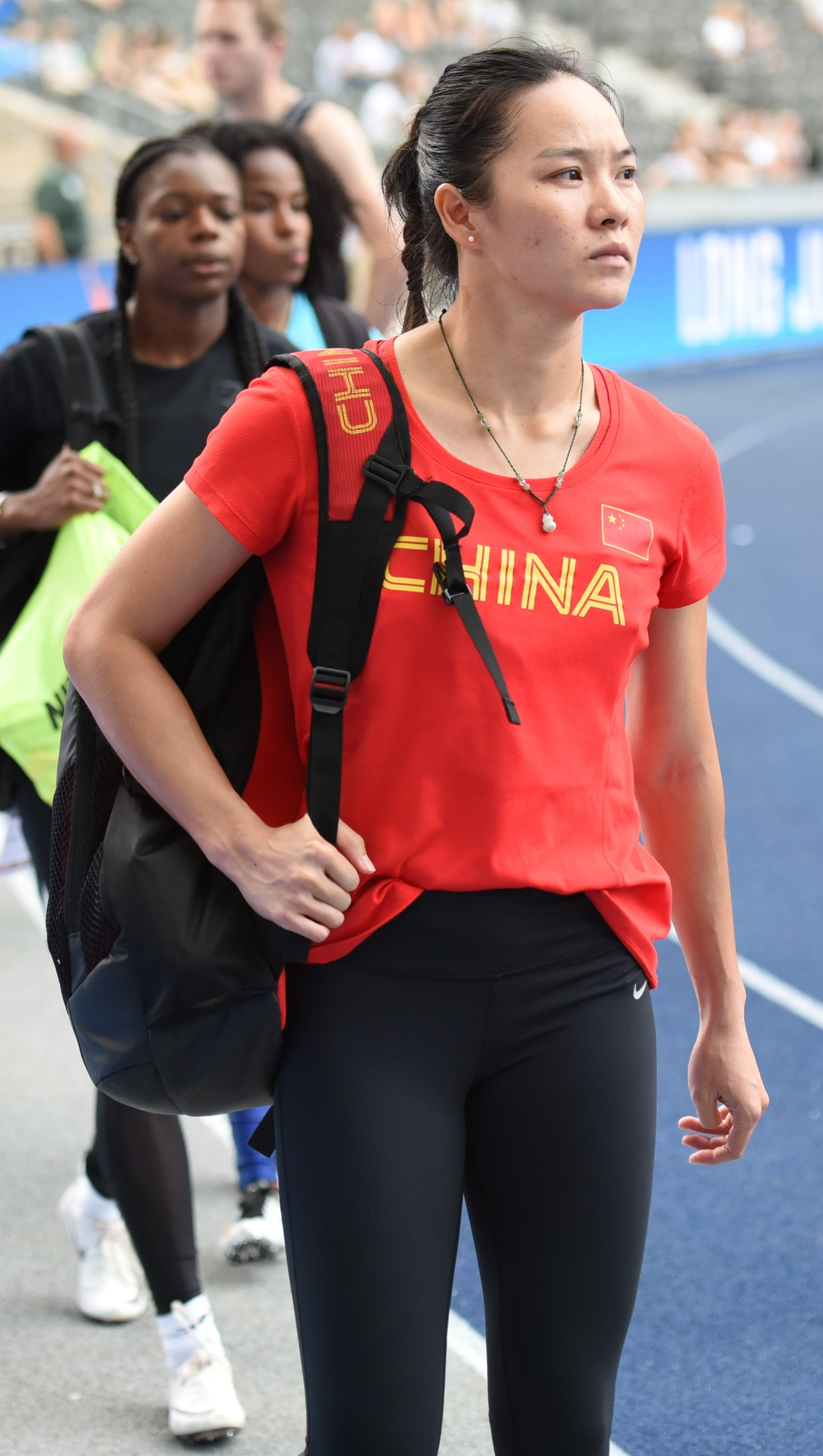
- Wei at the 2019 ISTAF in Berlin

Personal information
- Born: October 11, 1991 (age 34) Baise, Guangxi, China
- Height: 1.68 m (5 ft 6 in)
- Weight: 58 kg (128 lb)

Sport
- Country: China
- Sport: Athletics
- Event: 100 metres
- Coached by: Rana Reider
Medal record
Women's athletics
Representing China
World Relays
Silver medal – second place	2019 Yokohama	4×200 m relay
Bronze medal – third place	2017 Nassau	4×100 m relay
Asian Games
Gold medal – first place	2014 Incheon	100 m
Gold medal – first place	2014 Incheon	4×100 m relay
Gold medal – first place	2022 Hangzhou	4×100 m relay
Silver medal – second place	2014 Incheon	200 m
Asian Championships
Gold medal – first place	2013 Pune	100 m
Gold medal – first place	2013 Pune	4×100 m relay
Gold medal – first place	2015 Wuhan	4×100 m relay
Gold medal – first place	2019 Doha	4×100 m relay
Gold medal – first place	2023 Bangkok	4×100 m relay
Bronze medal – third place	2015 Wuhan	100 m
Bronze medal – third place	2019 Doha	100 m
Asian Indoor Championships
Gold medal – first place	2012 Hangzhou	60 m

Wei Yongli (Chinese: 韦永丽; born October 11, 1991, in Baise, Guangxi) is a Chinese sprinter. She competed in the 100 metres competition at the 2012 Summer Olympics; she ran Round 1 in 11.48 seconds, which did not qualify her for the semifinals.

She was part of the Chinese 4 x 100 m relay team that reached the final at the 2020 Olympics.

== Competition record ==
Year	Competition	Venue	Position	Event	Notes
Representing China
2011	Asian Championships	Kobe, Japan	2nd	100 m	11.70
2011	Asian Championships	Kobe, Japan	2nd	4 × 100 m relay	44.23
2011	World Championships	Daegu, South Korea	–	4 × 100 m relay	DQ
2012	Asian Indoor Championships	Hangzhou, China	1st	60 m	7.37
2012	World Indoor Championships	Istanbul, Turkey	17th (sf)	60 m	7.35
2012	Olympic Games	London, United Kingdom	40th (h)	100 m	11.48
2013	Asian Championships	Pune, India	1st	100 m	11.29
2013	Asian Championships	Pune, India	1st	4 × 100 m relay	44.01
2013	World Championships	Moscow, Russia	17th (h)	4 × 100 m relay	44.22
2013	East Asian Games	Tianjin, China	1st	100 m	11.57
2013	East Asian Games	Tianjin, China	1st	200 m	23.71
2013	East Asian Games	Tianjin, China	1st	4 × 100 m relay	43.66
2014	World Indoor Championships	Sopot, Poland	15th (sf)	60 m	7.30
2014	Asian Games	Incheon, South Korea	1st	100 m	11.48
2014	Asian Games	Incheon, South Korea	2nd	200 m	23.27
2014	Asian Games	Incheon, South Korea	1st	4 × 100 m relay	42.83
2015	Asian Championships	Wuhan, China	3rd	100 m	11.46
2015	Asian Championships	Wuhan, China	1st	4 × 100 m relay	43.10
2015	World Championships	Beijing, China	22nd (sf)	100 m	11.27
2015	World Championships	Beijing, China	10th (h)	4 × 100 m relay	43.18
2016	World Indoor Championships	Portland, United States	18th (sf)	60 m	7.28
2016	Olympic Games	Rio de Janeiro, Brazil	33rd (h)	100 m	11.48
2016	Olympic Games	Rio de Janeiro, Brazil	9th (h)	4 × 100 m relay	42.70
2017	World Relays	Nassau, Bahamas	3rd	4 × 100 m relay	43.11
2017	World Relays	Nassau, Bahamas	6th (h)	4 × 200 m relay	1:33.99
2017	World Championships	London, United Kingdom	26th (h)	100 m	11.37
2017	World Championships	London, United Kingdom	–	4 × 100 m relay	DQ
2018	World Indoor Championships	Birmingham, United Kingdom	28th (h)	60 m	7.35
2018	Asian Games	Jakarta, Indonesia	3rd	100 m	11.33
2018	Asian Games	Jakarta, Indonesia	3rd	200 m	23.27
2018	Asian Games	Jakarta, Indonesia	2nd	4 × 100 m relay	42.84
2019	Asian Championships	Doha, Qatar	3rd	100 m	11.37
2019	World Relays	Yokohama, Japan	–	4 × 100 m relay	DQ
2019	World Relays	Yokohama, Japan	2nd	4 × 200 m relay	1:32.76
2019	World Championships	Doha, Qatar	17th (sf)	100 m	11.28
2019	World Championships	Doha, Qatar	3rd (h)	4 × 100 m relay	42.36^{1}
2021	Olympic Games	Tokyo, Japan	38th (h)	100 m	11.48
2021	Olympic Games	Tokyo, Japan	6th	4 × 100 m relay	42.71
2022	World Championships	Eugene, United States	9th (h)	4 × 100 m relay	42.93
2023	Asian Championships	Bangkok, Thailand	1st	4 × 100 m relay	43.35
2023	Asian Games	Hangzhou, China	5th	100 m	11.40
2023	Asian Games	Hangzhou, China	1st	4 × 100 m relay	43.39

^{1}Disqualified in the final

== Personal bests ==
Outdoor

- 100 metres – 10.99 (+1.2 m/s) (La Chaux-de-Fonds 2018)
- 200 metres – 22.97 (+1.6 m/s) (Madrid 2018)

Indoor

- 60 metres – 7.17 (Nanjing 2016) NR
- 200 metres – 23.61 (Beijing 2014)
