= Lam On Ki =

Hong Kong sprinter

Personal information
- Born: 20 April 1992 (age 34)
- Education: Hong Kong Polytechnic University
- Height: 1.63 m (5 ft 4 in)
- Weight: 51 kg (112 lb)

Sport
- Sport: Track and field
- Event: 100 metres
- Club: Pacers Athletics Club

Angel Lam On Ki (born 20 April 1992) is an athlete from Hong Kong who specialises in the sprinting events. She is Hong Kong national record holder in the indoor 60,100 metres.

== Competition record ==
Year	Competition	Venue	Position	Event	Notes
Representing Hong Kong
2009	World Youth Championships	Brixen, Italy	24th (qf)	100 m	12.15
2009	Asian Championships	Guangzhou, China	6th	4 × 100 m relay	46.45
2010	Asian Junior Championships	Hanoi, Vietnam	4th	100 m	12.27
2010	Asian Junior Championships	Hanoi, Vietnam	5th	4 × 100 m relay	46.52
2010	World Junior Championships	Moncton, Canada	29th (h)	100 m	12.31
2010	Asian Games	Guangzhou, China	19th (h)	100 m	12.09
2010	Asian Games	Guangzhou, China	7th	4 × 100 m relay	46.40
2012	Asian Indoor Championships	Hangzhou, China	8th (sf)	60 m	7.65
2013	Asian Championships	Pune, India	16th (h)	100 m	12.25
2013	Asian Championships	Pune, India	5th	4 × 100 m relay	46.28
2013	East Asian Games	Tianjin, China	8th	100 m	12.37
2013	East Asian Games	Tianjin, China	4th	4 × 100 m relay	46.31
2014	Asian Indoor Championships	Hangzhou, China	8th	60 m	7.67
2014	Asian Games	Incheon, South Korea	16th (h)	100 m	12.34
2014	Asian Games	Incheon, South Korea	8th	4 × 100 m relay	46.14
2015	Asian Championships	Wuhan, China	17th (h)	100 m	12.29
2015	Universiade	Gwangju, South Korea	25th (h)	100 m	12.13
2015	Universiade	Gwangju, South Korea	34th (h)	200 m	27.23
2016	Asian Indoor Championships	Doha, Qatar	8th	60 m	7.52
2016	World Indoor Championships	Portland, United States	34th (h)	60 m	7.54
2017	Asian Championships	Bhubaneswar, India	10th (sf)	100 m	12.13
2017	Universiade	Taipei, Taiwan	27th (qf)	100 m	12.01
2017	Asian Indoor and Martial Arts Games	Ashgabat, Turkmenistan	7th	60 m	7.54
2018	Asian Indoor Championships	Tehran, Iran	4th	60 m	7.46
2018	Asian Games	Jakarta, Indonesia	14th (sf)	100 m	11.99
2018	Asian Games	Jakarta, Indonesia	8th	4 × 100 m relay	45.73
2019	Asian Championships	Doha, Qatar	9th (sf)	100 m	11.69

== Personal bests ==
Outdoor

- 100 metres – 11.62 (Hong Kong Record, Doha 2019)
- 200 metres – 27.23 (−1.8 m/s, Gwangju 2015)

Indoor

- 60 metres – 7.45 (Doha 2016) NR
