= Chisato Fukushima =

Japanese sprinter (born 1988)

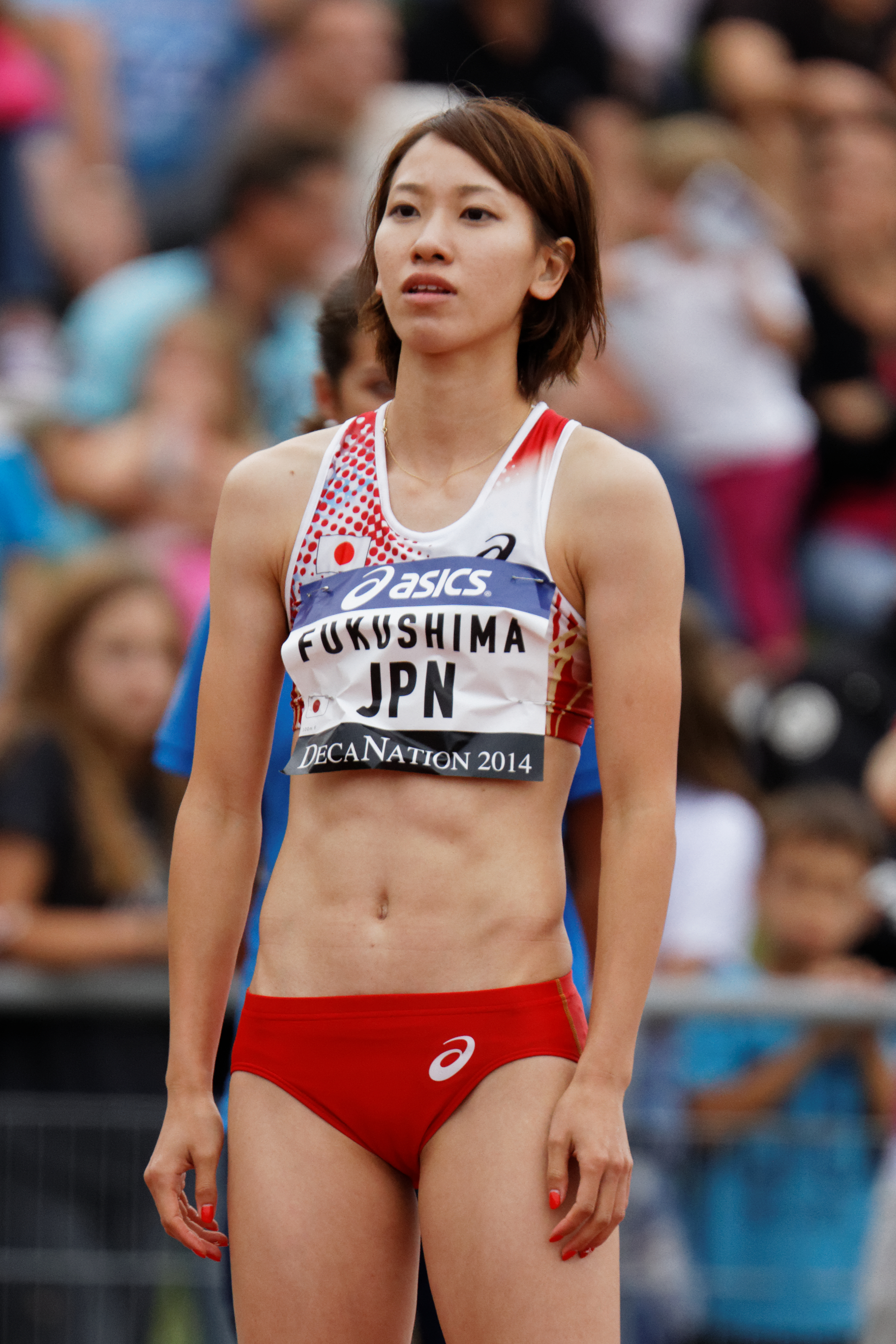
- Fukushima in 2014

Personal information
- Born: 27 June 1988 (age 38) Makubetsu, Hokkaido, Japan
- Height: 1.65 m (5 ft 5 in)
- Weight: 48 kg (106 lb)

Sport
- Country: Japan
- Sport: Running
- Events: 100 metres, 200 metres

Achievements and titles
- Personal best: 100 m: 11.21 200 m: 22.88
Medal record
Women's athletics
Representing Japan
Asian Games
Gold medal – first place	2010 Guangzhou	100 m
Gold medal – first place	2010 Guangzhou	200 m
Silver medal – second place	2014 Incheon	100 m
Bronze medal – third place	2010 Guangzhou	4 × 100 m Relay
Asian Athletics Championships
Gold medal – first place	2009 Guangzhou	100 m
Gold medal – first place	2009 Guangzhou	4 × 100 m Relay
Gold medal – first place	2011 Kobe	200 m
Gold medal – first place	2011 Kobe	4 × 100 m Relay
Gold medal – first place	2015 Wuhan	100 m
Silver medal – second place	2013 Pune	100 m

Chisato Fukushima (福島 千里, Fukushima Chisato; born 27 June 1988) is a Japanese track and field sprint athlete who competes internationally for Japan. She is the Japanese record holder in the women's 100 metres and 200 metres.

== Career ==
She began her career with appearances in the sprints at the 2005 World Youth Championships in Athletics and the 2006 World Junior Championships in Athletics. Fukushima represented Japan at the 2008 Summer Olympics in Beijing, and the 2012 Summer Games in London. She competed at the 100 m sprint and placed fifth in her heat without advancing to the second round. She ran the distance in a time of 11.74 seconds.

In 2009, she broke Sakie Nobuoka's 200 m Japanese national record of 23.33 seconds in Hiroshima, recording 23.14 seconds. Soon after, she broke the national record in the 100 m for the first time, registering 11.28, then 11.24 seconds. She also broke the 200 metres Japanese record again with a run of 23.14 seconds. Fukushima improved upon this in June at the Japanese national championships, winning the race in 23 seconds flat. In addition, this achieved the A standard, and qualification, for the 2009 World Championships in Athletics. However, at the championships she finished fourth in the 200 m heats and was eliminated. She managed to reach the quarter-finals of the 100 m however.

In November of the same year, she won her first Asian title in 100 m with 11.27 seconds into a negative wind of −1.0 m/s, at the 2009 Asian Championships in Athletics in Guangzhou, China. Three days later, she secured her second gold medal of the same meet together with her teammates in the women's 4 × 100 m relay final. She came third for the 2009 Japanese Athlete of the Year award by voting of an expert panel from Track and Field Magazine of Japan.

She began 2010 with a new record in the 100 m at the Mikio Oda Memorial International Amateur Athletic Game, recording a time of 11.21 seconds. She won the 100 m at the Japanese championships, beating Momoko Takahashi in a time of 11.39 seconds, but finished as runner-up behind her rival in the 200 m race. On 22 November, she won her first gold medal in 100 m at the 2010 Asian Games, again in Guangzhou, thus ending Japan's 44-year-long medal drought in the sprint event.

At the 2011 Seiko Golden Grand Prix Fukushima set a new national relay record of 43.39 seconds alongside Saori Kitakaze, Momoko Takahashi and Kana Ichikawa.

On 26 June 2011, Chisato Fukushima ran a 100 m time of 11.16 with +3.4 m/s wind in Tottori city, Japan.

In 2015, she won a gold medal at the Asian Athletics Championships.

Fukushima finally broke her own national record in the 200 meters when she clocked 22.88 seconds at the 100th Japan National Championships on 26 June 2016, in Nagoya, giving her a sixth straight title and earning her a berth at the Rio de Janeiro Olympics. Fukushima's time at Paloma Mizuho Stadium, cut 0.01 second off the previous record she set back on 3 May 2010, and marked the first time she had broken 23 seconds since then.

On 20 January 2017, Chisato Fukushima said in a statement, "I left Hokkaido College of High Technology and its Athletes Club today. And I decided to become the professional, starting from today".

On 11 January 2018, Chisato Fukushima said at a news conference at Seiko's headquarters in Tokyo, "I am very pleased that I joined Seiko. I concentrate on practice in a new environment, first of all I would like to aim for updating my self-record Japanese records.".

== Competition record ==
Year	Competition	Venue	Position	Event	Notes
Representing Japan
2005	World Youth Championships	Marrakesh, Morocco	16th (sf)	100 m	11.95
2005	World Youth Championships	Marrakesh, Morocco	22nd (sf)	200 m	24.87
2006	World Junior Championships	Beijing, China	23rd (sf)	100 m	12.11 (-1.8 m/s)
2006	World Junior Championships	Beijing, China	—	4 × 100 m relay	DQ
2008	Olympic Games	Beijing, China	47th (h)	100 m	11.74
2009	World Championships	Berlin, Germany	17th (qf)	100 m	11.43
2009	World Championships	Berlin, Germany	26th (h)	200 m	23.40
2009	World Championships	Berlin, Germany	14th (h)	4 × 100 m relay	44.24
2009	Asian Championships	Guangzhou, China	1st	100 m	11.27
2009	Asian Championships	Guangzhou, China	1st	4 × 100 m relay	43.93
2010	Continental Cup	Split, Croatia	6th	100 m	11.42
2010	Asian Games	Guangzhou, China	1st	100 m	11.33
2010	Asian Games	Guangzhou, China	1st	200 m	23.62
2010	Asian Games	Guangzhou, China	3rd	4 × 100 m relay	44.41
2011	Asian Championships	Kobe, Japan	1st	200 m	23.49
2011	Asian Championships	Kobe, Japan	1st	4 × 100 m relay	44.05
2011	World Championships	Daegu, South Korea	22nd (sf)	100 m	11.59
2011	World Championships	Daegu, South Korea	20th (sf)	200 m	23.52
2011	World Championships	Daegu, South Korea	11th (h)	4 × 100 m relay	43.83
2012	World Indoor Championships	Istanbul, Turkey	9th (h)	60 m	7.29 (NR)
2012	Olympic Games	London, United Kingdom	32nd (h)	100 m	11.41
2012	Olympic Games	London, United Kingdom	48 (h)	200 m	24.14
2012	Olympic Games	London, United Kingdom	15th (h)	4 × 100 m relay	44.25
2013	Asian Championships	Pune, India	2nd	100 m	11.53
2013	Asian Championships	Pune, India	4th	200 m	23.81
2013	Asian Championships	Pune, India	2nd	4 × 100 m relay	44.38
2013	World Championships	Moscow, Russia	37th (h)	200 m	23.85
2014	Asian Games	Incheon, South Korea	2nd	100 m	11.49
2014	Asian Games	Incheon, South Korea	3rd	200 m	23.45
2014	Asian Games	Incheon, South Korea	3rd	4 × 100 m relay	44.05
2015	Asian Championships	Wuhan, China	1st	100 m	11.23(+2.5m/s)
2015	Asian Championships	Wuhan, China	2nd	4 × 100 m relay	44.14
2015	World Championships	Beijing, China	23rd (sf)	100 m	11.32
2015	World Championships	Beijing, China	34th (h)	200 m	23.30
2016	Olympic Games	Rio de Janeiro, Brazil	38th (h)	200 m	23.21
2018	Asian Games	Jakarta, Indonesia	20th (h)	100 m	11.99
2019	Asian Championships	Doha, Qatar	16th (sf)	100 m	12.02

== Personal bests ==
Event	Time (sec)	Venue	Date
60 m (Indoor)	7.29	Istanbul, Turkey	10 March 2012
100 metres	11.21	Hiroshima, Japan	29 April 2010
200 metres	22.88	Nagoya, Japan	26 June 2016

- All information taken from IAAF profile.
