= Guzel Khubbieva =

Uzbekistani sprinter (born 1976)

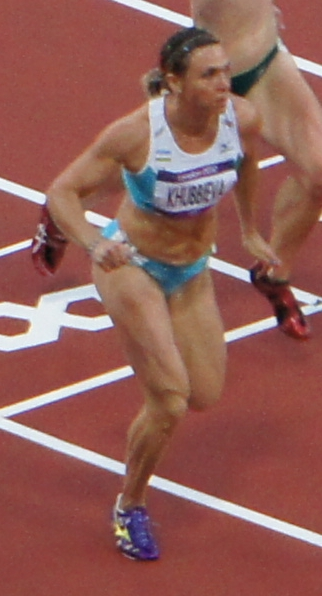
- Guzel Khubbieva at the 2012 Summer Olympics

Medal record

Women's athletics

Representing Uzbekistan

Asian Championships
Silver medal – second place	2002 Colombo	4×100 m
Silver medal – second place	2005 Incheon	100 m
Silver medal – second place	2005 Incheon	200 m
Bronze medal – third place	2003 Manila	100 m
Bronze medal – third place	2003 Manila	200 m

Guzel Khubbieva (born 2 May 1976) is an Uzbekistani sprinter who specializes in the 100 and 200 metres.

Khubbieva represented Uzbekistan at the 2008 Summer Olympics in Beijing competing at the 100 metres sprint. In her first round heat she placed third behind Muna Lee and Anita Pistone in a time of 11.44 to advance to the second round. There she failed to qualify for the semi-finals as her time of 11.49 was only the seventh time of her heat, causing elimination. She won the silver medal at the 2010 Asian Games. She also competed at the 2012 Summer Olympics. She didn't qualify for the second round.

== Competition record ==
Year	Competition	Venue	Position	Event	Notes
Representing Uzbekistan
1998	Asian Games	Bangkok, Thailand	6th	100 m	11.59 (w)
1998	Asian Games	Bangkok, Thailand	2nd	4 × 100 m relay	44.38
2000	Olympic Games	Sydney, Australia	22nd (qf)	4 × 100 m relay	45.14
2001	World Championships	Edmonton, Canada	12th (h)	4 × 100 m relay	45.99
2002	Asian Championships	Colombo, Sri Lanka	4th	100 m	11.82
2002	Asian Championships	Colombo, Sri Lanka	5th	200 m	24.15
2002	Asian Championships	Colombo, Sri Lanka	2nd	4 × 100 m relay	44.85
2002	Asian Games	Busan, South Korea	8th	100 m	11.69
2002	Asian Games	Busan, South Korea	5th	200 m	23.68
2002	Asian Games	Busan, South Korea	3rd	4 × 100 m relay	44.32
2003	World Championships	Paris, France	23rd (h)	100 m	11.42
2003	World Championships	Paris, France	16th (h)	4 × 100 m relay	45.74
2003	Asian Championships	Manila, Philippines	3rd	100 m	11.57
2003	Asian Championships	Manila, Philippines	3rd	200 m	23.63
2003	Afro-Asian Games	Hyderabad, India	6th	100 m	11.74
2003	Afro-Asian Games	Hyderabad, India	6th	4 × 100 m relay	45.16
2004	Olympic Games	Athens, Greece	19th (qf)	100 m	11.35
2005	Asian Championships	Incheon, South Korea	2nd	100 m	11.56
2005	Asian Championships	Incheon, South Korea	2nd	200 m	23.43
2006	World Indoor Championships	Moscow, Russia	12th (sf)	60 m	7.33
2006	World Cup	Athens, Greece	7th	100 m	
2006	World Cup	Athens, Greece	6th	200 m	
2006	Asian Games	Doha, Qatar	1st	100 m	11.27
2006	Asian Games	Doha, Qatar	2nd	200 m	23.30
2007	World Championships	Osaka, Japan	35th (h)	100 m	11.59
2007	World Championships	Osaka, Japan	24th (qf)	200 m	23.28
2008	World Indoor Championships	Valencia, Spain	12th (sf)	60 m	7.27
2008	Olympic Games	Beijing, China	26th (qf)	100 m	11.49
2008	Olympic Games	Beijing, China	28th (h)	200 m	23.44
2009	World Championships	Berlin, Germany	17th (qf)	100 m	11.43
2009	World Championships	Berlin, Germany	34th (h)	200 m	23.61
2009	Asian Championships	Guangzhou, China	8th (sf)	100 m	11.84
2009	Asian Indoor Games	Hanoi, Vietnam	2nd	60 m	7.39
2010	Asian Games	Guangzhou, China	2nd	100 m	11.34
2010	Asian Games	Guangzhou, China	3rd	200 m	23.87
2011	Asian Championships	Kobe, Japan	1st	100 m	11.39
2011	World Championships	Daegu, South Korea	31st (h)	100 m	11.45
2012	World Indoor Championships	Istanbul, Turkey	10th (sf)	60 m	7.25
2012	Olympic Games	London, United Kingdom	22nd (h)	100 m	11.22
2013	Asian Championships	Pune, India	9th (h)	100 m	11.87

=== Personal bests ===
- 60 metres – 7.19 s (2005)
- 100 metres – 11.20 s (2007)
- 200 metres – 23.16 s (2004)
