= Batgereliin Möngöntuyaa =

Mongolian sprinter (born 1988)

Personal information
- Nationality: Mongolia
- Born: 24 November 1988 (age 37) Övörkhangai aimag, Mongolia
- Height: 1.63 m (5 ft 4 in)
- Weight: 51 kg (112 lb)

Sport
- Sport: Athletics
- Event: Sprint

Achievements and titles
- Personal best: 400 m: 57.53 s (2008)

Batgereliin Möngöntuyaa (also Munguntuya Batgerel, Mongolian: Батгэрэлийн Мөнгөнтуяа; born November 24, 1988, in Övörkhangai aimag) is a Mongolian sprinter, who specialized in the 400 metres. Batgerel represented Mongolia at the 2008 Summer Olympics, where she competed for the women's 400 metres. She ran in the sixth heat against seven other athletes, including Jamaica's Novlene Williams and Great Britain's Nicola Sanders, both of whom were heavy favorites in this event. She finished the race in last place by three seconds behind Albania's Klodiana Shala, with a time of 58.14. Batgerel, however, failed to advance into the semi-finals, as she placed forty-seventh overall, and was ranked below three mandatory slots for the next round.
