= Semoy Hackett =

Trinidad and Tobago sprinter (born 1988)

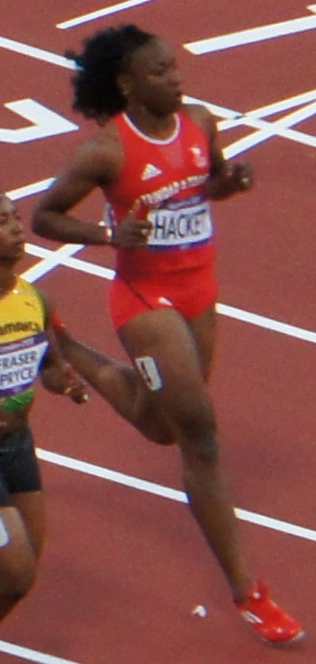
- Semoy Hackett at the 2012 Summer Olympics

Personal information
- Nationality: Trinidad and Tobago
- Born: 27 November 1988 (age 37) Lambeau, Tobago, Trinidad and Tobago
- Height: 1.73 m (5 ft 8 in)
- Weight: 61 kg (134 lb)

Sport
- Sport: Athletics
- Event(s): 100 metres, 200 metres
Medal record
World Championships
Bronze medal – third place	2015 Beijing	4 × 100 m relay

Semoy Kee-Ann Hackett (born 27 November 1988) is a Trinidad and Tobago track and field sprint athlete who competed collegiately at Louisiana State University. Her personal best in the 100 m is 11.09, and 22.49 in 200 m.

Hackett represented Trinidad and Tobago at the 2008 Summer Olympics in Beijing. She competed at the 100 metres sprint and placed fourth in her first round heat, which normally meant elimination. However, her time of 11.53 seconds was among the ten fastest losing times and she qualified for the second round. There she failed to qualify for the semi-finals as her time of 11.46 was the sixth time of her race. Together with Wanda Hutson, Ayanna Hutchinson and Kelly-Ann Baptiste she also took part in the 4 × 100 metres relay. In their first round heat they did not finish and were eliminated due to a mistake with the baton exchange.

Hackett ran a relay at the 2011 World Championships in Athletics, but was retrospectively disqualified and banned for six months because of a failed drugs test for methylhexaneamine at the National Championships.

In November 2012, Louisiana State University reported that Hackett had again tested positive for methylhexaneamine at the 2012 NCAA Division I Outdoor Track and Field Championships in June. LSU was forced to vacate their national championship due to the failed drug test. Hackett was given a doping ban of two-year and four months. The ban ended 30 April 2015.

== Achievements ==
Year	Competition	Venue	Position	Event	Notes
Representing Trinidad and Tobago
2004	CARIFTA Games (U-17)	Hamilton, Bermuda	5th (h)	100 m	12.94 (-1.8 m/s)
2004	CARIFTA Games (U-17)	Hamilton, Bermuda	3rd	4 × 100 m relay	47.79s
2004	Central American and Caribbean; Junior Championships (U-17)	Coatzacoalcos, Mexico	3rd	100 m	11.97 (+0.4 m/s)
2004	Central American and Caribbean; Junior Championships (U-17)	Coatzacoalcos, Mexico	1st	4 × 100 m relay	46.08
2006	CARIFTA Games (U-20)	Les Abymes, Guadeloupe	3rd	100 m	11.68 (+0.7 m/s)
2006	CARIFTA Games (U-20)	Les Abymes, Guadeloupe	3rd	4 × 100 m relay	45.72
2006	Central American and Caribbean; Junior Championships (U-20)	Port of Spain, Trinidad and Tobago	3rd	100 m	11.71 (+1.0 m/s)
2006	Central American and Caribbean; Junior Championships (U-20)	Port of Spain, Trinidad and Tobago	3rd	200 m	23.62 (+2.0 m/s)
2006	Central American and Caribbean; Junior Championships (U-20)	Port of Spain, Trinidad and Tobago	3rd	4 × 100 m relay	45.75
2006	World Junior Championships	Beijing, China	33rd (h)	100 m	11.94 (+0.4 m/s)
2006	World Junior Championships	Beijing, China	29th (h)	200 m	24.59 (-0.7 m/s)
2009	Central American and Caribbean Championships	Havana, Cuba	2nd	100 m	11.35
2010	NACAC U23 Championships	Miramar, United States	4th	100 m	11.33 (+2.2 m/s) w
2011	Central American and Caribbean Championships	Mayagüez, Puerto Rico	1st	100 m	11.27 (+0.5 m/s)
2011	Central American and Caribbean Championships	Mayagüez, Puerto Rico	1st	4 × 100 m	43.47
2015	NACAC Championships	San José, Costa Rica	2nd	200 m	22.51 (+1.3 m/s)
2015	World Championships	Beijing, China	14th (sf)	100 m	11.13
2015	World Championships	Beijing, China	11th (sf)	200 m	22.75
2015	World Championships	Beijing, China	3rd	4 × 100 m	42.03
2016	Olympic Games	Rio de Janeiro, Brazil	16th (sf)	100 m	11.20
2016	Olympic Games	Rio de Janeiro, Brazil	20th (sf)	200 m	22.94
2016	Olympic Games	Rio de Janeiro, Brazil	5th	4 × 100 m	42.12
2017	IAAF World Relays	Nassau, Bahamas	–	4 × 100 m	DNF
2017	IAAF World Relays	Nassau, Bahamas	4th	4 × 200 m	1:32.63
2018	Commonwealth Games	Gold Coast, Australia	7th	200 m	23.16
2018	Commonwealth Games	Gold Coast, Australia	4th	4 × 100 m relay	43.50
2018	Central American and Caribbean Games	Barranquilla, Colombia	2nd	200 m	22.95
2018	Central American and Caribbean Games	Barranquilla, Colombia	2nd	4 × 100 m relay	43.61
2018	NACAC Championships	Toronto, Canada	5th	200 m	23.27
2019	World Relays	Yokohama, Japan	7th (h)	4 × 100 m relay	43.67
2019	Pan American Games	Lima, Peru	8th	200 m	23.62
2019	World Championships	Doha, Qatar	6th	4 × 100 m relay	42.71
