= Beauty Nazmun Nahar =

Bangladeshi sprinter

- Born: January 1, 1984 (age 42)

Beauty Nazmun Nahar (Bengali: বিউটি নাজমুন নাহার; born January 1, 1984) is a track and field sprint athlete who competes internationally for Bangladesh.

Nazmun Nahar represented Bangladesh at the 2008 Summer Olympics in Beijing. She competed at the 100 metres sprint and placed eighth in her heat without advancing to the second round. She ran the distance in a time of 12.52 seconds.
