= Fong Yee Pui =

Hong Kong sprinter (born 1991)

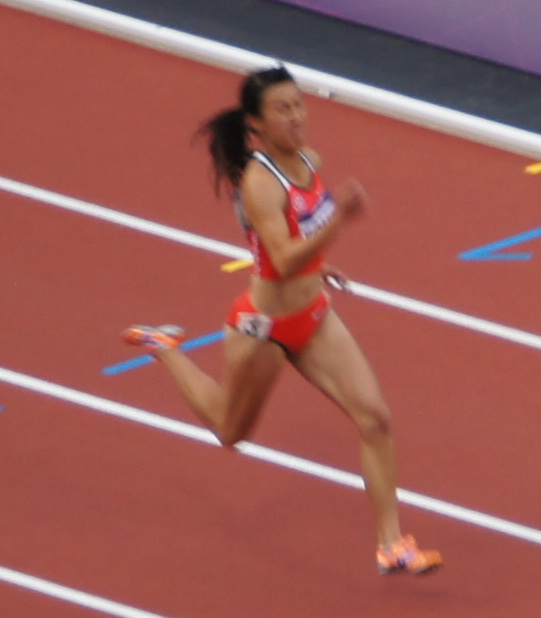
Fong Yee Pui at the 2012 Summer Olympics

Fong Yee Pui OLY (Chinese: 方綺蓓; Jyutping: fong^{1} ji^{2} pui^{5}; born December 24, 1991, in Hong Kong) is a Hong Konger sprinter. She competed in the 100 metres competition at the 2012 Summer Olympics; she ran the preliminaries in 12.02 seconds, qualifying her for Round 1, and Round 1 in 11.98 seconds, which did not qualify her for the semifinals. She also competed at the 2013 World Athletics Championships, the 2011 and 2013 Asian Championships, the 2012 World Indoor Championships and the 2012 Asian Indoor Championships.
