= Afa Ismail =

Maldivian sprinter

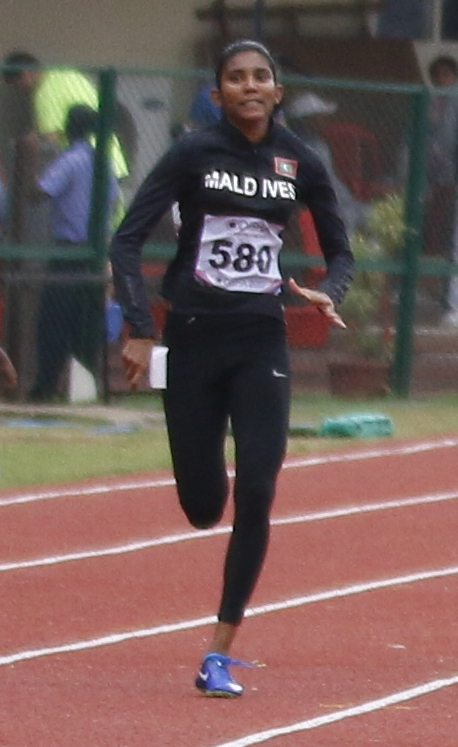
- Afa Ismail in 2017

Personal information
- Born: 1 November 1993 (age 32) Malé, Maldives
- Height: 1.57 m (5 ft 2 in)
- Weight: 45 kg (99 lb)

Sport
- Country: Maldives

Achievements and titles
- Personal bests: 100m: 12.32; 200m: 24.96 NR
Medal record
Gold medal – first place	Johor Open Athletics Championship 2015	100 metres
Gold medal – first place	Johor Open Athletics Championship 2015	200 metres

Afa Ismail (born 1 November 1993 in Malé) is a Maldivian sprinter. She competed in the 100 metres competition at the 2012 Summer Olympics and 200 metres event for the Maldives at the 2016 Summer Olympics in Rio de Janeiro. She was the flag bearer for the Maldives during the closing ceremony.

She is the current national record holder in the 200 metres and the 4×100 metres relay.

== Achievements ==
=== Personal bests ===
- 100 metres – 12.32
- 200 metres – 24.96 (Rio 2016) NR

=== National titles ===
- 3 Times Renewed 200 Meters National Record - 2011, 15, 16
- 3 Times National Athletics Tournament Overall Best Female Athlete - 2012, 13, 14
- 4 Times National 200 Meters Champion - 2012, 13, 14, 16
- 5 Times National Long Jump Champion - 2011, 12, 13, 14, 16
- 3 Times National 100 Meters Champion - 2012, 13, 14
