= Maryam Tousi =

Iranian sprinter (born 1988)

Maryam Toosi
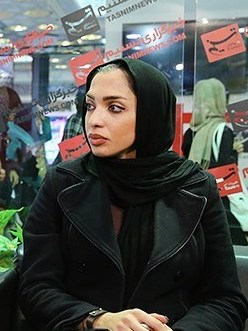

Personal information
- Full name: Maryam Toosi
- Nationality: Iran
- Born: 5 December 1988 (age 37) Tehran, Iran
- Education: Physical Education; University of Tehran
- Height: 1.72 m (5 ft 8 in)
- Weight: 62 kg (137 lb)

Sport
- Country: Iran
- Sport: Track and field: Sprint
- Events: 60 metres; 100 metres; 200 metres; 400 metres; 4 × 400 metres relay
Medal record
Women's athletics
Representing Iran
Asian Indoor Championships
Gold medal – first place	2012 Hangzhou	400 m
Gold medal – first place	2014 Hangzhou	400 m
Silver medal – second place	2016 Doha	4×400 m relay
Bronze medal – third place	2010 Tehran	4×400 m relay
Bronze medal – third place	2014 Hangzhou	60 m
Islamic Solidarity Games
Gold medal – first place	2013 Palembang	100 m
Gold medal – first place	2013 Palembang	200 m

Maryam Toosi (Persian: مریم طوسی; born 5 December 1988, in Tehran) is an Iranian sprint athlete who specializes in the 400 metres and 200 metres. She is the Iranian record holder in the 200 m (23.22, 2024) and 400 m (52.95, 2012). She competed in the 200 m at the 2011 IAAF World Championships.
