= Tao Yujia =

Chinese sprinter (born 1987)

Medal record

Women's athletics

Representing China

Asian Indoor Championships
Gold medal – first place	2014 Hangzhou	60 m
Silver medal – second place	2012 Hangzhou	60 m

Tao Yujia (born 16 February 1987 in Jiujiang, Jiangxi) is a Chinese sprinter who specializes in the 100 metres. Her personal best time is 11.37 seconds, achieved in July 2011 in Nanjing.

Tao represented China at the 2008 Summer Olympics in Beijing competing at the 4 × 100 metres relay together with Wang Jing, Jiang Lan and Qin Wangping. In their first round heat they placed fourth behind Jamaica, Russia and Germany. Their time of 43.78 seconds was the tenth time overall out of sixteen participating nations. With this result they failed to qualify for the final.
