= 2015 Asian Athletics Championships – Men's 4 × 100 metres relay =

The men's 4 × 100 metres event at the 2015 Asian Athletics Championships was held on June 4.

== Medalists ==
Gold	Silver	Bronze
China; Chen Shiwei; Mo Youxue; Su Bingtian; Zhang Peimeng; Wu Zhiqiang*	Hong Kong; Tang Yik Chun; So Chun Hong; Ng Ka Fung; Tsui Chi Ho	Chinese Taipei; Wang Wen-Tang; Yang Chun-Han; Lo Yen-Yao; Shen Yu-Sen

*Athletes who competed in heats only.

== Results ==
=== Heats ===
First 3 in each heat (Q) and 2 best performers (q) advanced to the final.

Rank	Heat	Team	Name	Time	Notes
1	2	China	Chen Shiwei, Mo Youxue, Su Bingtian, Wu Zhiqiang	39.02	Q
2	2	Chinese Taipei	Wang Wen-Tang, Yang Chun-Han, Lo Yen-Yao, Shen Yu-Sen	39.57	Q
3	2	Sri Lanka	Himasha Eashan, Shehan Ambepitiya, Vinoj Muthumuni, Mohamed Abdul Ladeef	39.59	Q, NR
4	2	Oman	Mohamed Hindi, Barakat Al-Harthi, Abdullah Al-Sooli, Khalid Al-Ghailani	39.70	q
5	1	Thailand	Kritsada Namsuwan, Aphisit Promkaew, Jirapong Meenapra, Jaran Sathoengram	39.85	Q
6	1	Hong Kong	Tang Yik Chun, So Chun Hong, Ng Ka Fung, Tsui Chi Ho	39.87	Q
7	1	India	Shankar Debnath, Umar Rane, Amiya Kumar Mallick, Abdul Najeeb Qureshi	40.09	Q
8	2	Saudi Arabia	Bandar Atiah Kaabi, Fahhad Mohammed Al-Subaie, Ali Hussain Al-Zaki, Ahmed Al-Muwallad	40.22	q
9	1	South Korea	Kim Woo-sam, Choi Min-suk, Kim Ui-yeon, Kim Kuk-young	40.42	
10	1	Maldives	Nujoom Hassan, Hussain Haleem, Ali Shareef, Hassan Saaid	41.90	
	2	Kuwait		DNS	

=== Final ===
Rank	Lane	Nation	Competitors	Time	Notes
1st place, gold medalist(s)	4	China	Chen Shiwei, Mo Youxue, Su Bingtian, Zhang Peimeng	39.04	
2nd place, silver medalist(s)	3	Hong Kong	Tang Yik Chun, So Chun Hong, Ng Ka Fung, Tsui Chi Ho	39.25	
3rd place, bronze medalist(s)	6	Chinese Taipei	Wang Wen-Tang, Yang Chun-Han, Lo Yen-Yao, Shen Yu-Sen	39.35	
4	7	Sri Lanka	Himasha Eashan, Shehan Ambepitiya, Vinoj Muthumuni, Mohamed Abdul Ladeef	39.38	NR
5	5	Thailand	Kritsada Namsuwan, Aphisit Promkaew, Jirapong Meenapra, Jaran Sathoengram	39.38	
6	8	India	Shankar Debnath, Umar Rane, Amiya Kumar Mallick, Abdul Najeeb Qureshi	39.67	
7	2	Oman	Mohamed Hindi, Barakat Al-Harthi, Abdullah Al-Sooli, Khalid Al-Ghailani	39.75	
8	1	Saudi Arabia	Bandar Atiah Kaabi, Fahhad Mohammed Al-Subaie, Ali Hussain Al-Zaki, Ahmed Binmarzouq	40.41	
