= Athletics at the 2013 Islamic Solidarity Games – Results =

These are partial results of the athletics competition at the 2013 Islamic Solidarity Games which took place between 25 and 29 September 2013 in Palembang, Indonesia.

== Men's results ==
=== 100 metres ===
Heats – 25 September
Wind:
Heat 1: -0.8 m/s, Heat 2: -0.2 m/s, Heat 3: -1.5 m/s

Rank	Heat	Name	Nationality	Time	Notes
1	1	Barakat Al-Harthi	Oman	10.50	Q
2	1	Amr Ibrahim Mostafa Seoud	Egypt	10.75	Q
1	2	Reza Ghasemi	Iran	10.54	Q
2	2	Abdelghani Zaghali	Morocco	10.70	Q
3	2	Umutcan Emektaş	Turkey	10.72	q
4	2	Bandar Atiyah Kaabi	Saudi Arabia	10.81	
5	2	Mohamed Salim	Libya	10.87	
6	2	Mohd Shahmini Azmi	Malaysia	10.88	
1	3	Idrissa Adam	Cameroon	10.51	Q
2	3	Fahad Al-Subaie	Saudi Arabia	10.53	Q
3	3	Adama Jammeh	Gambia	10.66	q
4	3	Harith Ammar Mohd Sobri	Malaysia	10.92	
	3	Abdullah Al-Sooli	Oman	DQ	

Final – 25 September
Wind:
0.0 m/s

Rank	Name	Nationality	Time	Notes
1st place, gold medalist(s)	Reza Ghasemi	Iran	10.29	
2nd place, silver medalist(s)	Barakat Al-Harthi	Oman	10.34	
3rd place, bronze medalist(s)	Fahad Al-Subaie	Saudi Arabia	10.37	SB
4	Idrissa Adam	Cameroon	10.47	
5	Amr Ibrahim Mostafa Seoud	Egypt	10.56	
6	Adama Jammeh	Gambia	10.59	
7	Umutcan Emektaş	Turkey	10.59	SB
8	Abdelghani Zaghali	Morocco	10.69	

=== 200 metres ===
Heats – 27 September
Wind:
Heat 1: +0.1 m/s, Heat 2: +0.3 m/s, Heat 3: +1.2 m/s, Heat 4: -0.2 m/s

Rank	Heat	Name	Nationality	Time	Notes
1	1	Fahad Al-Subaie	Saudi Arabia	21.08	Q
2	1	Abdelghani Zaghali	Morocco	21.42	q
3	1	Erkin Özkan	Turkey	21.88	
1	2	Winston George	Guyana	20.89	Q
2	2	Barakat Al-Harthi	Oman	21.03	q, SB
3	2	Mazen Al-Yassin	Saudi Arabia	21.58	q
5	2	Ali Hassan Al-Jassim	Qatar	22.19	
1	3	Idrissa Adam	Cameroon	20.80	Q, SB
2	3	Reza Ghasemi	Iran	21.06	q
4	3	Khalifa Ibrahim Said	United Arab Emirates	22.13	
1	4	Adama Jammeh	Gambia	21.36	Q
2	4	Abdullah Al-Sooli	Oman	21.59	
3	4	Abubaker El Tawerghi	Libya	22.49	

Final – 27 September
Wind:
-0.4 m/s

Rank	Name	Nationality	Time	Notes
1st place, gold medalist(s)	Fahad Al-Subaie	Saudi Arabia	20.74	NJR
2nd place, silver medalist(s)	Winston George	Guyana	20.77	
3rd place, bronze medalist(s)	Reza Ghasemi	Iran	20.96	
4	Idrissa Adam	Cameroon	21.03	
5	Adama Jammeh	Gambia	21.34	
	Abdelghani Zaghali	Morocco	DNF	
	Barakat Al-Harthi	Oman	DQ	
	Mazen Al-Yassin	Saudi Arabia	DQ	

=== 400 metres ===
Heats – 25 September

Rank	Heat	Name	Nationality	Time	Notes
1	3	Ismail Al-Sabani	Saudi Arabia	47.19	Q
2	3	Halit Kılıç	Turkey	47.33	Q
3	3	Miloud Laaredj	Algeria	47.50	q
4	1	Youssef Al-Masrahi	Saudi Arabia	47.74	Q
5	2	Winston George	Guyana	47.97	Q
6	3	Ali Abd Salem	Libya	48.11	q
7	2	Abdul Rahim	Cameroon	48.46	Q
8	3	Thomas Vandy	Sierra Leone	48.63	
9	3	Aleedi Abdalla Rashid	United Arab Emirates	48.86	
10	2	Mayouf Hassan	United Arab Emirates	48.95	
11	1	Hassan Aman Salmeen	Qatar	49.00	Q
12	1	Yacobus Leuwol	Indonesia	49.16	
13	3	Aron Anchois	Malaysia	49.21	
14	1	Batuhan Altıntaş	Turkey	49.32	
15	2	Naser Osmail Al-Samaeil	Kuwait	49.72	
16	1	Paneerselvan Yuvaraaj	Malaysia	50.40	
	1	Azim Abdullaev	Tajikistan	DNS	
	1	Khalifa Ibrahim Said	United Arab Emirates	DNS	
	2	Aleksandr Pronzhenko	Tajikistan	DNS	
	2	Soufiane Bouhadda	Algeria	DNS	

Final – 26 September

Rank	Name	Nationality	Time	Notes
1st place, gold medalist(s)	Youssef Al-Masrahi	Saudi Arabia	45.18	
2nd place, silver medalist(s)	Winston George	Guyana	46.10	SB
3rd place, bronze medalist(s)	Miloud Laaredj	Algeria	46.26	SB
4	Ismail Al-Sabani	Saudi Arabia	46.28	
5	Halit Kılıç	Turkey	46.96	SB
6	Ali Abd Salem	Libya	47.79	PB
7	Abdul Rahim	Cameroon	48.11	PB
8	Hassan Aman Salmeen	Qatar	49.69	

=== 800 metres ===
Heats – 25 September

Rank	Heat	Name	Nationality	Time	Notes
1	1	Abdulrahman Musaeb Balla	Saudi Arabia	1:49.31	Q
2	1	Yassine Hethat	Algeria	1:49.82	Q
3	1	Aboubaker El-Gatrouni	Libya	1:50.15	SB
4	1	Ebrahim Al-Zofairi	Kuwait	1:53.05	
5	1	Mohd Jironi Riduan	Malaysia	1:53.60	
6	1	Ali Ghulam Ramadh	United Arab Emirates	2:15.07	
	1	Khaydar Dalerjoni	Tajikistan	DNS	
1	2	İlham Tanui Özbilen	Turkey	1:47.16	Q
2	2	Nader Belhanbel	Morocco	1:47.68	Q
3	2	Tarek Eshebli	Libya	1:48.55	q, PB
4	2	Youssef Saad Kamel	Bahrain	1:49.77	q
5	2	Vedivellan Mahendran	Malaysia	1:59.14	
7	2	Shivaz Mohamed	Maldives	2:00.77	
~~1~~	3	Abdulaziz Ladan	Saudi Arabia	~~1:49.52~~	Q
1	3	Samir Jamaa	Morocco	1:50.02	Q
2	3	Sadjad Moradi	Iran	1:50.87	SB
3	3	Karar Al-Abbody	Iraq	1:53.56	
4	3	Ahmed Hassan	Maldives	1:59.04	
	3	Hamada Mohamed	Egypt	DNS	

Final – 26 September

Rank	Name	Nationality	Time	Notes
~~1~~	Abdulaziz Ladan	Saudi Arabia	~~1:43.86~~	Doping
1st place, gold medalist(s)	Abdulrahman Musaeb Balla	Qatar	1:44.19	
2nd place, silver medalist(s)	İlham Tanui Özbilen	Turkey	1:45.65	
3rd place, bronze medalist(s)	Nader Belhanbel	Morocco	1:47.81	
4	Youssef Saad Kamel	Bahrain	1:48.27	SB
5	Yassine Hethat	Algeria	1:49.55	
6	Tarek Eshebli	Libya	1:50.10	
7	Samir Jamaa	Morocco	1:53.13	

=== 1500 metres ===
28 September

Rank	Name	Nationality	Time	Notes
1st place, gold medalist(s)	İlham Tanui Özbilen	Turkey	3:39.69	
2nd place, silver medalist(s)	Mohamed Moustaoui	Morocco	3:40.91	
3rd place, bronze medalist(s)	Fouad El Kaam	Morocco	3:41.20	
4	Abderrahmane Anou	Algeria	3:41.33	
5	Nour Imed Hamed	Saudi Arabia	3:42.18	
6	Khaled Giaeda	Libya	3:42.78	PB
7	Adnan Taees Akkar	Iraq	3:43.03	NR
8	Sadjad Moradi	Iran	3:45.31	
9	Hashim Mohamed Salah	Qatar	3:46.68	
10	Abdullah Obaid Al-Salhi	Saudi Arabia	3:50.09	
11	Mohd Jironi Riduan	Malaysia	3:52.72	SB
12	Abdullahi Barre Kulow	Somalia	4:00.07	
13	Muhammad Hafis	Indonesia	4:05.49	
14	Shivaz Mohamed	Maldives	4:12.99	
15	Ahmed Hassan	Maldives	4:13.94	
	Youssef Saad Kamel	Bahrain	DNF	
	Omar Al-Rasheedi	Kuwait	DNF	
	Mekhrubon Shamsidinov	Tajikistan	DNS	
	Vedivellan Mahendran	Malaysia	DNS	
	Abdoulaye Abdelkerin	Chad	DNS	

=== 5000 metres ===
28 September

Rank	Name	Nationality	Time	Notes
1st place, gold medalist(s)	Hayle Ibrahimov	Azerbaijan	14:03.12	
2nd place, silver medalist(s)	Ali Kaya	Turkey	14:04.59	
~~3~~	Othmane El Goumri	Morocco	~~14:07.59~~	Doping
3rd place, bronze medalist(s)	Dejenee Regassa	Bahrain	14:09.34	
4	Abdullah Abdulaziz Al-Joud	Saudi Arabia	14:45.47	
5	Rabah Aboud	Algeria	14:48.48	

=== 10,000 metres ===
25 September

Rank	Name	Nationality	Time	Notes
1st place, gold medalist(s)	Ali Kaya	Turkey	29:36.64	
2nd place, silver medalist(s)	Mustapha El Aziz	Morocco	29:50.64	
3rd place, bronze medalist(s)	Hassan Mahboob Ali	Bahrain	29:55.85	SB
4	Hicham Bellani	Morocco	30:27.99	
5	Tilahun Aliyev	Azerbaijan	31:02.90	SB

=== 110 metres hurdles ===
25 September
Wind: +0.2 m/s

Rank	Name	Nationality	Time	Notes
1st place, gold medalist(s)	Amir Shaker	Iraq	13.89	
1st place, gold medalist(s)	Abdulaziz Al-Mandeel	Kuwait	13.89	
3rd place, bronze medalist(s)	Rayzam Shah Wan Sofian	Malaysia	13.97	
4	Yaqoub Al-Yoha	Kuwait	14.00	SB
5	Rami Ibrahim Kareem	Iraq	14.17	
6	Mohd Robani Hassan	Malaysia	14.18	SB
7	Mustafa Güneş	Turkey	14.46	
8	Rami Gharsalli	Tunisia	14.69	

=== 400 metres hurdles ===
27 September

Rank	Name	Nationality	Time	Notes
1st place, gold medalist(s)	Abdelmalik Lahoulou	Algeria	50.96	
2nd place, silver medalist(s)	Mehmet Güzel	Turkey	51.66	PB
3rd place, bronze medalist(s)	Andrian	Indonesia	51.82	
4	Saoud Mohamed Abdulkarim	United Arab Emirates	52.32	
5	Ali Obaid Shirook	United Arab Emirates	52.43	SB
6	Muhamad Firdaus Mazalan	Malaysia	53.71	

=== 3000 metres steeplechase ===
26 September

Rank	Name	Nationality	Time	Notes
1st place, gold medalist(s)	Tarık Langat Akdağ	Turkey	8:28.79	
2nd place, silver medalist(s)	Hamid Ezzine	Morocco	8:37.46	
3rd place, bronze medalist(s)	Tareq Mubarak Taher	Bahrain	8:44.20	
4	Ahmad Foroud	Iran	8:48.70	PB
5	Hicham Bouchicha	Algeria	8:48.71	
6	Saeed Abbas Al-Thomali	Saudi Arabia	8:56.27	SB
7	Maaz Abdelrahman Shagag	Qatar	9:02.10	
8	Ahmad Luth Hamizan	Malaysia	9:54:47	
	Monatcer Zaghou	Morocco	DNS	

=== 4 × 100 metres relay ===
28 September

Rank	Nation	Competitors	Time	Notes
1st place, gold medalist(s)	Oman	Fahad Khamis Al-Jabri, Barakat Al-Harthi, Abdullah Al-Sooli, Mohammed Obaid Al-Hindi	39.72	
2nd place, silver medalist(s)	Saudi Arabia	Bandar Atia Al-Kaabi, Fahad Mohamed Al-Subaie, Hamoud Al-Wani, Ahmed Fayaz Marzouk	40.20	
3rd place, bronze medalist(s)	Indonesia	Yaspy Bobi, Sapwaturrahman, Mohd Fadlin, Abdul Hamid Abdullah Iswandi	40.37	
4	Malaysia	Aron Anchois, Mohd Shahmimi, Harith Ammar, Rayzamshah Wan Sofian	40.43	
	Turkey	Mustafa Güneş, Erkin Özkan, Alper Kulaksız, Umutcan Emektaş	DQ	
	Iraq		DNS	

=== 4 × 400 metres relay ===
28 September

Rank	Nation	Competitors	Time	Notes
1st place, gold medalist(s)	Saudi Arabia	Ismail Al-Sabiani, Mohammed Al-Bishi, Mazen Al-Yasen, Yousef Masrahi	3:03.70	
2nd place, silver medalist(s)	Turkey	Batuhan Altıntaş, Halit Kiliç, Mehmet Güzel, İlham Tanui Özbilen	3:06.43	
3rd place, bronze medalist(s)	Algeria	Miloud Laredj, Lyes Sabri, Abdelmalik Lahoulou, Mohamed Belbachir	3:09.04	
4	Indonesia	Heru Astrianto, Edi Ariansyah, Deny Hadiwijaya, Yacobus Leuwol	3:11.21	
5	United Arab Emirates	Ibrahim Khalifa, Mayuf Hassan Ahmed, Ali Obaid Shirook, Saoud Mohamed Abdulkarim	3:13.33	
6	Libya	Ali Abd Salem, Aboubaker El-Gatrouni, Khaled Giaeda, Tarek Eshebli	3:13.42	
	Iraq		DNS	

=== 20 kilometres walk ===
29 September

Rank	Name	Nationality	Time	Notes
1st place, gold medalist(s)	Mabrook Saleh Mohamed	Qatar	1:31:26	
2nd place, silver medalist(s)	Hakmali Sauda	Indonesia	1:34:23	SB
3rd place, bronze medalist(s)	Gabriel Ngnintedem	Cameroon	1:39:52	
4	Mohd Khairul Harith Harun	Malaysia	1:42:57	
	Lo Choon Sieng	Malaysia	DQ	
	Hendro	Indonesia	DQ	
	Hussein Mohammed Al-Khairi	Qatar	DQ	
	Razzaq Abed Asmeer	Iraq	DNS	

=== High jump ===
25 September

Rank	Name	Nationality	Result	Notes
1st place, gold medalist(s)	Keyvan Ghanbarzadeh	Iran	2.20	
2nd place, silver medalist(s)	Majdeddin Ghazal	Syria	2.20	
3rd place, bronze medalist(s)	Nauraj Singh Randhawa	Malaysia	2.18	
4	Muamer Aissa Barsham	Qatar	2.16	
5	Hashim Issa Al-Oqabi	Saudi Arabia	2.16	SB
6	Temfack Fernan Djoumessi	Cameroon	2.14	
7	Nawaf Ahmed Al-Yami	Saudi Arabia	2.11	
8	Kavee-Alagan Anpalagan	Malaysia	2.05	
8	Serhat Birinci	Turkey	2.05	

=== Pole vault ===
28 September

Rank	Name	Nationality	Result	Notes
1st place, gold medalist(s)	Mouhcine Cheaouri	Morocco	5.10	
2nd place, silver medalist(s)	Mohsen Rabbani	Iran	5.00	
3rd place, bronze medalist(s)	Mohamed Romdhana	Tunisia	4.90	SB
4	Alwi Iskandar	Malaysia	4.90	
5	Hussain Asim Al-Hizam	Saudi Arabia	4.60	
6	Hendri Setiawan	Indonesia	4.60	
7	Fahed Al-Mershad	Kuwait	4.60	
8	Alim Al-Sabag	Kuwait	4.60	
	Eko Wicaksono	Indonesia	NM	
	Mohd Zam Zam Fahmie	Malaysia	NM	

=== Long jump ===
26 September

Rank	Name	Nationality	Result	Notes
1st place, gold medalist(s)	Ahmad Fayaz Marzouk	Saudi Arabia	7.80	
2nd place, silver medalist(s)	Mohammad Arzandeh	Iran	7.70	
3rd place, bronze medalist(s)	Saleh Al-Haddad	Kuwait	7.66	SB
4	Jassim Mustafa Abdulraouf	United Arab Emirates	7.63	
5	Mohamed Fathalla Difallah	Egypt	7.61	
6	Alper Kulaksız	Turkey	7.44	
7	Daniel Noval	Philippines	7.38	PB
8	Rikwan Weleburun	Indonesia	7.16	
9	Mustafa Güneş	Turkey	6.98	
9	Essa Sami Buhadi	Kuwait	6.90	
10	Vincent Okot	Uganda	6.54	

=== Triple jump ===
28 September

Rank	Name	Nationality	Result	Notes
1st place, gold medalist(s)	Tarik Bouguetaïb	Morocco	16.29	
2nd place, silver medalist(s)	Mohamed Youssef Al-Sahabi	Bahrain	15.90	
3rd place, bronze medalist(s)	Aşkin Karaca	Turkey	15.76	
4	Abdullah Asril	Indonesia	15.73	PB
5	Murad Ibadullayev	Azerbaijan	15.69	
6	Mohamed Rihani	Libya	15.28	PB
7	Vincent Okot	Uganda	14.93	
8	Abdallah Mohamed Al-Yoha	Kuwait	14.89	
	Hugo Mamba-Schlick	Cameroon	DNS	

=== Shot put ===
25 September

Rank	Name	Nationality	Result	Notes
1st place, gold medalist(s)	Sultan Al-Hebshi	Saudi Arabia	18.65	
2nd place, silver medalist(s)	Meshari Saad Suroor	Kuwait	18.59	
3rd place, bronze medalist(s)	Hüseyin Atıcı	Turkey	18.56	
4	Hisham Abdelhamid Abdelaziz	Egypt	17.79	
5	Yasser Farag Ibrahim	Egypt	17.23	
6	Hussein Adi Alifuddin	Malaysia	16.18	
7	Krisna Wahyu	Indonesia	15.06	

=== Discus throw ===
26 September

Rank	Name	Nationality	#1	#2	#3	#4	#5	#6	Result	Notes
1st place, gold medalist(s)	Ehsan Haddadi	Iran	61.64	63.99	62.73	65.03	x	66.03	66.03	
2nd place, silver medalist(s)	Mohammad Samimi	Iran	60.80	x	59.73	x	60.19	62.19	62.19	
3rd place, bronze medalist(s)	Irfan Yıldırım	Turkey							59.97	
4	Ercüment Olgundeniz	Turkey							58.77	
5	Sultan Mubarak Al-Dawoodi	Saudi Arabia							58.76	
6	Yasser Farag Ibrahim	Egypt							56.01	
7	Haidar Nasser Abdul Shaheed	Iraq							55.75	
8	Essa Al-Zenkawi	Kuwait							54.80	
9	Ali Khalifa Maaloul	Libya							53.81	
10	Hisham Abdelhamid Abdelaziz	Egypt							49.62	
	Taufik Nur Rohman	Indonesia							NM	

=== Hammer throw ===
27 September

Rank	Name	Nationality	Result	Notes
1st place, gold medalist(s)	Mostafa Al-Gamel	Egypt	77.73	
2nd place, silver medalist(s)	Ali Al-Zinkawi	Kuwait	76.68	SB
3rd place, bronze medalist(s)	Dzmitry Marshin	Azerbaijan	70.52	
~~4~~	Hassan Mohamed Mahmoud	Egypt	~~70.52~~	Doping
4	Kaveh Mousavi	Iran	68.01	
5	Driss Barid	Morocco	67.30	
6	Jackie Wong Siew Cheer	Malaysia	59.53	NR
	Mohamed Abdulkarim Al-Jawher	Kuwait	NM	

=== Javelin throw ===
27 September

Rank	Name	Nationality	Result	Notes
1st place, gold medalist(s)	Ihab Abdelrahman	Egypt	78.96	
2nd place, silver medalist(s)	Fatih Avan	Turkey	78.15	
3rd place, bronze medalist(s)	Ahmed El-Shabramsly	Egypt	69.02	
4	Khamis Ghabish Al-Outeibi	Oman	62.99	
5	Abdullah Al-Ameeri	Kuwait	62.28	
6	Ali Mohamed Al-Jadaani	Saudi Arabia	58.89	
7	Abdullah Mohamed Al-Ghamdi	Saudi Arabia	58.18	
8	Elchin Gasimov	Azerbaijan	47.94	

== Women's results ==
=== 100 metres ===
Heats – 25 September
Wind:
Heat 1: -0.3 m/s, Heat 2: -1.0 m/s

Rank	Heat	Name	Nationality	Time	Notes
1	1	Komalam Shally Selveratnam	Malaysia	12.28	Q
2	2	Maryam Tousi	Iran	12.30	Q
3	1	Nimet Karakuş	Turkey	12.41	Q
4	2	Saliha Özyurt	Turkey	12.45	Q
5	1	Valeriya Balyanina	Azerbaijan	12.66	Q
6	1	Saleh Mazoon Khalfan	Oman	12.86	q
7	2	Mildred Gamba	Uganda	12.95	Q
8	2	Shinoona Al-Habsi	Oman	13.31	q
	1	Dana Hussain	Iraq	DNS	
	1	Kamila Pulatova	Tajikistan	DNS	
	2	Yelena Ryabova	Turkmenistan	DNS	
	2	Vladislava Ovcharenko	Tajikistan	DNS	
	2	Marie-Josée Ta Lou	Ivory Coast	DNS	

Final – 25 September
Wind:
-0.3 m/s

Rank	Name	Nationality	Time	Notes
1st place, gold medalist(s)	Maryam Tousi	Iran	11.67	NR
2nd place, silver medalist(s)	Nimet Karakuş	Turkey	12.11	
3rd place, bronze medalist(s)	Komalam Shally Selveratnam	Malaysia	12.11	
4	Saliha Özyurt	Turkey	12.29	
5	Valeriya Balyanina	Azerbaijan	12.34	SB
6	Mazoon Al-Alawi	Oman	12.65	
7	Mildred Gamba	Uganda	12.79	
8	Shinoona Al-Habsi	Oman	13.14	

=== 200 metres ===
27 September
Wind: -0.1 m/s

Rank	Name	Nationality	Time	Notes
1st place, gold medalist(s)	Maryam Tousi	Iran	23.72	
2nd place, silver medalist(s)	Komalam Shally Selveratnam	Malaysia	25.16	
3rd place, bronze medalist(s)	Abir Barkaoui	Tunisia	25.47	
4	Mazoon Al-Alawi	Oman	26.09	
5	Saliha Özyurt	Turkey	26.26	
	Shinoona Al-Habsi	Oman	DQ	

=== 400 metres ===
26 September

Rank	Name	Nationality	Time	Notes
1st place, gold medalist(s)	Malika Akkaoui	Morocco	53.19	PB
2nd place, silver medalist(s)	Hasna Grioui	Morocco	54.88	
3rd place, bronze medalist(s)	Mariatu Suma	Sierra Leone	55.27	PB
4	Birsen Engin	Turkey	55.35	
5	Abir Barkaoui	Tunisia	56.84	
6	Shafa Mammadova	Azerbaijan	58.82	
7	Mariama Kamara	Guinea	1:05.61	

=== 800 metres ===
26 September

Rank	Name	Nationality	Time	Notes
1st place, gold medalist(s)	Malika Akkaoui	Morocco	2:06.97	
2nd place, silver medalist(s)	Siham Hilali	Morocco	2:07.29	
3rd place, bronze medalist(s)	Tuğba Koyuncu	Turkey	2:09.17	
4	Genzeb Shumi	Bahrain	2:11.08	
5	Ganthimanthi Kumarasamy	Malaysia	2:15.32	
6	Lismawati Ilang	Indonesia	2:17.36	

=== 1500 metres ===
28 September

Rank	Name	Nationality	Time	Notes
1st place, gold medalist(s)	Rababe Arafi	Morocco	4:19.27	
2nd place, silver medalist(s)	Siham Hilali	Morocco	4:19.79	
3rd place, bronze medalist(s)	Betlehem Desalegn	United Arab Emirates	4:20.09	
4	Mimi Belete	Bahrain	4:21.10	
5	Esma Aydemir	Turkey	4:21.49	
6	Elif Dağdelen	Turkey	4:21.94	
7	Genzeb Shumi	Bahrain	4:27.28	
8	Fatima Ghassan Rayya	Syria	4:45.71	
9	Ganthimanthi Kumarasamy	Malaysia	4:45.99	
10	Lismawati Ilang	Indonesia	4:50.03	
11	Alika Morgan	Guyana	5:01.84	

=== 5000 metres ===
27 September

Rank	Name	Nationality	Time	Notes
1st place, gold medalist(s)	Maryam Yusuf Jamal	Bahrain	16:15.76	SB
2nd place, silver medalist(s)	Betlehem Desalegn	United Arab Emirates	16:16.84	
3rd place, bronze medalist(s)	Layes Abdullayeva	Azerbaijan	16:49.08	
4	Alika Morgan	Guyana	19:07.84	
	Elif Dağdelen	Turkey	DNF	
	Esma Aydemir	Turkey	DNF	

=== 10,000 metres ===
26 September

Rank	Name	Nationality	Time	Notes
1st place, gold medalist(s)	Shitaye Eshete	Bahrain	32:35.78	
2nd place, silver medalist(s)	Kenza Dahmani	Algeria	33:06.41	
3rd place, bronze medalist(s)	Alia Saeed Mohammed	United Arab Emirates	33:44.12	
	Esma Aydemir	Turkey	DNF	
	Khadija Samnah	Morocco	DNF	

=== 100 metres hurdles ===
28 September
Wind: +0.7 m/s

Rank	Name	Nationality	Time	Notes
1st place, gold medalist(s)	Dedeh Erawati	Indonesia	13.54	
2nd place, silver medalist(s)	Yamina Hajjaji	Morocco	13.96	
3rd place, bronze medalist(s)	Raja Nursheena Azhar	Malaysia	13.98	
4	Lamiae Lhabze	Morocco	14.17	
5	Emilia Nova	Indonesia	14.41	
6	Sema Apak	Turkey	14.47	
7	Buthayna Eid Al-Yacoubi	Oman	14.47	PB

=== 400 metres hurdles ===
27 September

Rank	Name	Nationality	Time	Notes
1st place, gold medalist(s)	Hayat Lambarki	Morocco	57.92	
2nd place, silver medalist(s)	Lamiae Lhabze	Morocco	58.16	
3rd place, bronze medalist(s)	Özge Akın	Turkey	59.44	
4	Birsen Engin	Turkey	1:00.01	
	Maroua El Najjar	Tunisia	DQ	

=== 3000 metres steeplechase ===
26 September

Rank	Name	Nationality	Time	Notes
1st place, gold medalist(s)	Amina Bettiche	Algeria	10:05.63	
2nd place, silver medalist(s)	Elif Dağdelen	Turkey	10:07.79	SB
3rd place, bronze medalist(s)	Salima El Ouali Alami	Morocco	10:08.86	
4	Fatima Ghassan Rayya	Syria	11:17.79	NR
	Woroud Sawalha	Palestine	DNF	

=== 4 × 100 metres relay ===
28 September

Rank	Nation	Competitors	Time	Notes
1st place, gold medalist(s)	Turkey	Saliha Özyurt, Birsen Engin, Sema Apak, Nimet Karakuş	46.59	
2nd place, silver medalist(s)	Morocco	Jamaa Chnaik, Hayat Lambarki, Lamiae Lhabze, Yamina Hjaji	47.18	
3rd place, bronze medalist(s)	Oman	Mazoon Al-Alawi, Shinoona Al-Habsi, Hiba Al-Asmi, Buthaina Al-Yaqoubi	49.20	
	Indonesia		DNS	

=== 4 × 400 metres relay ===
28 September

Rank	Nation	Competitors	Time	Notes
1st place, gold medalist(s)	Morocco	Hasna Grioui, Malika Akkaoui, Lamiae Lhabze, Hayat Lambarki	3:38.56	
2nd place, silver medalist(s)	Turkey	Özge Akın, Birsen Engin, Esma Aydemir, Sema Apak	3:53.26	
3rd place, bronze medalist(s)	Oman	Mazoon Al-Alawi, Shinoona Al-Habsi, Hiba Al-Asmi, Buthaina Al-Yaqoubi	4:30.09	
	Indonesia		DNS	

=== High jump ===
26 September

Rank	Name	Nationality	Result	Notes
1st place, gold medalist(s)	Burcu Yüksel	Turkey	1.80	
2nd place, silver medalist(s)	Sevim Sinmez Serbest	Turkey	1.65	PB
3rd place, bronze medalist(s)	Maroua El Najjar	Tunisia	1.65	

=== Pole vault ===
26 September

Rank	Name	Nationality	Result	Notes
1st place, gold medalist(s)	Buse Arıkazan	Turkey	3.95	
2nd place, silver medalist(s)	Elmas Seda Firtina	Turkey	3.85	
3rd place, bronze medalist(s)	Nisrine Dinar	Morocco	3.85	
4	Dorra Mahfoudhi	Tunisia	3.65	

=== Long jump ===
25 September

Rank	Name	Nationality	Result	Notes
1st place, gold medalist(s)	Jamaa Chnaik	Morocco	5.95	
2nd place, silver medalist(s)	Jihad Bakhechi	Morocco	5.89	
3rd place, bronze medalist(s)	Sema Apak	Turkey	5.71	SB
4	Abir Barkaoui	Tunisia	5.40	
5	Dorra Mahfoudhi	Tunisia	4.88	

=== Triple jump ===
27 September

Rank	Name	Nationality	Result	Notes
1st place, gold medalist(s)	Yekaterina Sariyeva	Azerbaijan	13.28	
2nd place, silver medalist(s)	Jamaa Chnaik	Morocco	12.99	
3rd place, bronze medalist(s)	Jihad Bakhechi	Morocco	12.89	
4	Sevim Sinmez Serbest	Turkey	12.81	

=== Shot put ===
26 September

Rank	Name	Nationality	Result	Notes
1st place, gold medalist(s)	Leyla Rajabi	Iran	17.02	
2nd place, silver medalist(s)	Eki Febri Ekawati	Indonesia	14.00	NR
3rd place, bronze medalist(s)	Elçin Kaya	Turkey	13.21	SB
4	Lantari Dewi	Indonesia	12.78	
5	Raghad Al-Zubaidi	Oman	11.06	

=== Discus throw ===
25 September

Rank	Name	Nationality	Result	Notes
1st place, gold medalist(s)	Elçin Kaya	Turkey	53.33	PB
2nd place, silver medalist(s)	Dwi Ratnawati	Indonesia	47.14	
3rd place, bronze medalist(s)	Raghad Al-Zubaidi	Oman	29.64	

|}

=== Javelin throw ===
25 September

Rank	Name	Nationality	Result	Notes
1st place, gold medalist(s)	Eki Febri Ekawati	Indonesia	34.37	
2nd place, silver medalist(s)	Hiba Al-Asmi	Oman	33.03	
3rd place, bronze medalist(s)	Maroua El Najjar	Tunisia	30.76	
	Abir Barkaoui	Tunisia	DNS	
