= 2011 Asian Athletics Championships – Men's 100 metres =

The men's 100 metres at the 2011 Asian Athletics Championships was held at the Kobe Universiade Memorial Stadium on the 7 and 8 of July.

== Medalists ==
Gold	Su Bingtian; China
Silver	Masashi Eriguchi; Japan
Bronze	Sota Kawatsura; Japan

== Records ==
2011 Asian Athletics Championships
World record	Usain Bolt (JAM)	9.58	Berlin, Germany	16 August 2009
Asian record	Samuel Francis (QAT)	9.99	Amman, Jordan	26 July 2007
Championship record	Samuel Francis (QAT)	9.99	Amman, Jordan	26 July 2007
World Leading	Asafa Powell (JAM)	9.78	Lausanne, Switzerland	30 June 2011
Asian Leading	Yusuke Kotani (JPN)	10.28	Hiroshima, Japan	29 April 2011

== Schedule ==
Date	Time	Round
7 July 2011	10:20	Round 1
7 July 2011	17:45	Semifinals
8 July 2011	18:05	Final

== Results ==
=== Round 1 ===
First 3 in each heat (Q) and 4 best performers (q) advanced to the Semifinals.

Rank	Heat	Name	Nationality	Time	Notes
1	4	Su Bingtian	China	10.41	Q
2	1	Barakat Al-Harthi	Oman	10.45	Q
2	2	Masashi Eriguchi	Japan	10.45	Q
4	4	Tsui Chi Ho	Hong Kong	10.48	Q
5	2	Samuel Francis	Qatar	10.51	Q
6	4	Yasir Baalghayth Alnashri	Saudi Arabia	10.52	Q
7	1	Yusuke Kotani	Japan	10.55	Q
8	3	Qiang Chen	China	10.58	Q
9	3	Shehan Ambepitiya	Sri Lanka	10.64	Q
10	3	Kim Kuk-young	South Korea	10.65	Q
10	4	Fadlin Fadlin	Indonesia	10.65	q
11	3	Lai Chun Ho	Hong Kong	10.67	q
12	2	Reza Ghasemi	Iran	10.68	Q
13	4	Sota Kawatsura	Japan	10.69	q
14	3	Muhammad Amirudin Jamal	Singapore	10.70	q
15	2	Liu Yuan-Kai	Chinese Taipei	10.72	
16	1	Jirapong Meenapra	Thailand	10.73	Q
17	4	Wachara Sondee	Thailand	10.76	
18	4	Hadef Saif Al-Zaabi	United Arab Emirates	10.77	
19	2	Elfi Mustapa	Singapore	10.78	
20	2	Aymen Mohammed	Iraq	10.79	
21	3	Li Wei-Chen	Chinese Taipei	10.88	
22	3	Eisa Alyouhah	Kuwait	10.91	
23	3	Battulgyn Achitbileg	Mongolia	10.95	
24	1	Khalil Al-Hanahneh	Jordan	11.15	
25	2	Franklin Ramses Burumi	Indonesia	11.28	
26	1	Mohan Mohan Khan	Bangladesh	11.31	
27	1	Pao Hin Fang	Macau	11.33	
28	2	Iong Kim Fai	Macau	12.61	
29	1	Ghloam Shareq Hamkar	Afghanistan	DQ	FS
30	1	Liaquat Ali	Pakistan	DQ	FS

=== Semi-finals ===
First 3 in each heat (Q) and 2 best performers (q) advanced to the final.

Rank	Heat	Name	Nationality	Time	Notes
1	2	Su Bingtian	China	10.31	Q
2	1	Masashi Eriguchi	Japan	10.36	Q
3	1	Qiang Chen	China	10.47	Q
4	1	Sota Kawatsura	Japan	10.48	Q
5	1	Barakat Al-Harthi	Oman	10.50	q
6	2	Yusuke Kotani	Japan	10.52	Q
7	2	Fadlin Fadlin	Indonesia	10.56	Q
8	2	Yasir Baalghayth Alnashri	Saudi Arabia	10.62	q
9	1	Reza Ghasemi	Iran	10.64	
10	2	Tsui Chi Ho	Hong Kong	10.66	
11	1	Lai Chun Ho	Hong Kong	10.67	
12	2	Shehan Ambepitiya	Sri Lanka	10.68	
13	2	Muhammad Amirudin Jamal	Singapore	10.69	
14	2	Jirapong Meenapra	Thailand	10.70	
15	1	Kim Kuk-young	South Korea	10.73	
	1	Samuel Francis	Qatar	DNS	

=== Final ===
Rank	Lane	Name	Nationality	Time	Notes
1st place, gold medalist(s)	7	Su Bingtian	China	10.21	
2nd place, silver medalist(s)	6	Masashi Eriguchi	Japan	10.28	
3rd place, bronze medalist(s)	9	Sota Kawatsura	Japan	10.30	
4	2	Yasir Baalghayth Alnashri	Saudi Arabia	10.31	
5	5	Qiang Chen	China	10.33	
6	3	Barakat Al-Harthi	Oman	10.38	
7	4	Yusuke Kotani	Japan	10.39	
8	8	Fadlin Fadlin	Indonesia	10.49	
