= 2013 Asian Athletics Championships – Men's 4 × 100 metres relay =

The men's 4 × 100 metres event at the 2013 Asian Athletics Championships was held at the Shree Shiv Chhatrapati Sports Complex on 6 July 2013

== Medalists ==
Gold	Silver	Bronze
Hong Kong; Tang Yik Chun; Ng Ka Fung; Lai Chun Ho; Tsui Chi Ho; Ho Man Lok*	Japan; Kazuma Oseto; Sota Kawatsura; Kei Takase; Yuichi Kobayashi	China; Guo Fan; Su Bingtian; Xie Zhenye; Chen Qiang

*Athlete(s) who competed in heats only.

== Results ==
=== Heats ===
First 3 in each heat (Q) and 2 best performers (q) advanced to the Final.

Rank	Heat	Team	Name	Time	Notes
1	1	Japan	Kazuma Oseto, Kei Takase, Yuichi Kobayashi, Sota Kawatsura	39.10	Q
2	1	South Korea	Oh Kyong-soo, Yoo Min-woo, Cho Kyu-won, Kim Kuk-young	39.15	Q
3	1	Hong Kong	Tsui Chi Ho, Ho Man Lok, Ng Ka Fung, Lai Chun Ho	39.43	Q
4	1	Oman	Fahad Al-Jabri, Abdullah Al-Saadi, Barakat Al-Harthi, Abdullah Al-Sooli	39.78	q
5	2	Chinese Taipei	Wang Wen-Tang, Pan Po-Yu, Liu Yuan-Kai, Yi Wei-Chen	39.85	Q
6	2	China	Su Bingtian, Guo Fan, Xie Zhenye, Chen Qiang	39.95	Q
7	1	Bahrain	Mohamed Salman, Abdulla Al-Ameeri, Ali Al-Doseri, Isa Ghailan	40.98	q
8	2	Macau	Pao Hin Fong, Yang Zi Xian, Chan Kin Fong, Lam Kin Hang	42.52	Q
9	2	Afghanistan	A. Anwari, Abdul Qadeer Ghani Zada, Shareg Hamkar, Massoud Azizi	44.40	
	2	Singapore	Calvin Kang, Cheng Wei Lee, Gary Yeo, Mohd Amiruddin Jamal	DNF	
	2	India	Vijayakumar M., Sameer Mon, Krishna Kumar Rane, Manikanda Raj	DNF	

=== Final ===
Rank	Nation	Competitors	Time	Notes
1st place, gold medalist(s)	Hong Kong	Tang Yik Chun, Ng Ka Fung, Lai Chun Ho, Tsui Chi Ho	38.94	
2nd place, silver medalist(s)	Japan	Kazuma Oseto, Sota Kawatsura, Kei Takase, Yuichi Kobayashi	39.11	
3rd place, bronze medalist(s)	China	Guo Fan, Su Bingtian, Xie Zhenye, Chen Qiang	39.17	
4	South Korea	Oh Kyong-soo, Yoo Min-woo, Cho Kyu-won, Kim Kuk-young	39.18	
5	Chinese Taipei	Wang Wen-Tang, Pan Po-Yu, Liu Yuan-Kai, Yi Wei-Chen	39.52	
6	Macau	Pao Hin Fong, Lam Kin Hang, Yang Zi Xian, Chan Kin Fong	41.87	
	Oman	Obaid Al-Quraini, Abdullah Al-Sooli, Barakat Al-Harthi, Fahad Al-Jabri	DNF	
	Bahrain	Isa Ghailan, Abdulla Al-Ameeri, Ali Al-Doseri, Mohamed Salman	DQ	FS
