= 2011 Asian Athletics Championships – Men's 4 × 100 metres relay =

The men's 4 × 100 metres relay at the 2011 Asian Athletics Championships was held at the Kobe Universiade Memorial Stadium on the 8 and 10 of July.

== Medalists ==
Gold	Sota Kawatsura; Masashi Eriguchi; Shinji Takahira; Hitoshi Saito; Japan
Silver	Tang Yik Chun; Lai Chun Ho; Ng Ka Fung; Chi Ho Tsui; Hong Kong
Bronze	Wang Wen-Tang; Liu Yuan-Kai; Tsai Meng-Lin; Yi Wei-Chen; Chinese Taipei

== Records ==
2011 Asian Athletics Championships
World record	Nesta Carter; Michael Frater; Usain Bolt; Asafa Powell; Jamaica	37.10	Beijing, China	22 August 2008
Asian record	Nobuharu Asahara; Shinji Takahira; Shingo Suetsugu; Naoki Tsukahara; Japan	38.03	Osaka, Japan	1 September 2007
Championship record	Kongdech Natenee; Vissanu Sophanich; Ekkachai Janthana; Sittichai Suwonprateep; Thailand	38.80	Jakarta, Indonesia	2000

== Results ==
=== Round 1 ===
First 3 in each heat (Q) and 2 best performers (q) advanced to the Final.

Rank	Heat	Team	Name	Time	Notes
1	2	Japan	Yuichi Kobayashi, Masashi Eriguchi, Shinji Takahira, Hitoshi Saito	38.92	Q
2	1	China	Lao Yi, Liang Jiahong, Su Bingtian, Chen Qiang	39.15	Q
3	2	Hong Kong	Tang Yik Chun, Lai Chun Ho, Ng Ka Fung, Tsui Chi Ho	39.33	Q
4	2	Chinese Taipei	Wang Wen-Tang, Liu Yuan-Kai, Tsai Meng-Lin, Yi Wei-Chen	39.36	Q
5	1	Thailand	Narakorn Chaiprasert, Wachara Sondee, Sompote Suwannarangsri, Jirapong Meenapra	39.68	Q
6	1	South Korea	Yeo Ho-sua, Jeong Duk-hyung, Kim Kuk-young, Lim Hee-Nam	39.75	Q
7	1	India	Ritesh Anand, Krishna Kumar Rane, Shameer Mon, Rahamatulla Molla	40.13	q
8	2	Singapore	Calvin Kang Li Loong, Muhammad Amirudin Jamal, Yeo Foo Ee, Elfi Mustapa	40.17	q
9	1	Oman	Fahad Al-Jabri, Yahya Al-Noufali, Abdullah Al-Sooli, Yousuf Aulud Thani	40.38	
10	1	Indonesia	Farrel Octaviandi, Iswandi Iswandi, Fadlin Fadlin, Heru Astriyanto	40.52	
	2	United Arab Emirates	Hadef Saif Al Zaabi, Hussain Albalooshi, Bilal Jouma Al-Salfa, Omar Jouma Al-Salfa	DNF	

=== Final ===
Rank	Lane	Team	Name	Time	Notes
1st place, gold medalist(s)	4	Japan	Sota Kawatsura, Masashi Eriguchi, Shinji Takahira, Hitoshi Saito	39.18	
2nd place, silver medalist(s)	7	Hong Kong	Tang Yik Chun, Lai Chun Ho, Ng Ka Fung, Tsui Chi Ho	39.26	
3rd place, bronze medalist(s)	8	Chinese Taipei	Wang Wen-Tang, Liu Yuan-Kai, Tsai Meng-Lin, Yi Wei-Chen	39.30	
4	6	China	Lao Yi, Liang Jiahong, Su Bingtian, Chen Qiang	39.33	
5	5	Thailand	Narakorn Chaiprasert, Wachara Sondee, Sompote Suwannarangsri, Jirapong Meenapra	39.72	
6	9	South Korea	Kim Kuk-Young, Lim Hee-Nam, Yeo Ho-Sua, Cho Kyu-Won	39.85	
7	3	Singapore	Calvin Kang Li Loong, Muhammad Amirudin Jamal, Yeo Foo Ee, Elfi Mustapa	40.24	
8	2	India	Ritesh Anand, Krishna Kumar Rane, Shameer Mon, Rahamatulla Molla	40.38	
