= 2013 Asian Athletics Championships – Men's 100 metres =

The men's 100 metres at the 2013 Asian Athletics Championships was held at the Shree Shiv Chhatrapati Sports Complex on 3 and 4 July.

== Medalists ==
Gold	Su Bingtian; China
Silver	Samuel Francis; Qatar
Bronze	Barakat Al-Harthi; Oman

== Records ==
2013 Asian Athletics Championships
World record	Usain Bolt (JAM)	9.58	Berlin, Germany	16 August 2009
Asian record	Samuel Francis (QAT)	9.99	Amman, Jordan	26 July 2007
Championship record	Samuel Francis (QAT)	9.99	Amman, Jordan	26 July 2007

== Schedule ==
Date	Time	Round
3 July 2013	17:30	Round 1
4 July 2013	17:00	Semifinals
4 July 2013	19:15	Final

== Results ==
=== Heats ===
First 3 in each heat (Q) and 4 best performers (q) advanced to the Semifinals.

Wind: Heat 1: -0.2 m/s, Heat 2: +0.1 m/s, Heat 3: -0.3 m/s, Heat 4: +0.1 m/s

Rank	Heat	Name	Nationality	Time	Notes
1	2	Samuel Francis	Qatar	10.17	Q
2	4	Su Bingtian	China	10.31	Q
3	4	Barakat Al-Harthi	Oman	10.36	Q
4	2	Sota Kawatsura	Japan	10.40	Q
5	1	Reza Ghasemi	Iran	10.41	Q
6	3	Naoki Tsukahara	Japan	10.47	Q
7	3	Fahad Al-Subaie	Saudi Arabia	10.48	Q
8	3	Hassan Taftian	Iran	10.49	Q
9	1	Ng Ka Fung	Hong Kong	10.51	Q
10	2	Liaquat Ali	Pakistan	10.53	Q
11	3	Tsui Chi Ho	Hong Kong	10.58	q
12	4	Aniruddh Gujjar	India	10.62	Q
13	2	Sapwaturrahman	Indonesia	10.68	q
13	4	Eid Abdulla Al-Kuwari	Qatar	10.68	q
15	1	Ali Al-Doseri	Bahrain	10.72	Q
16	4	Mohamed Salman	Bahrain	10.81	q
17	1	Kritsada Namsuwan	Thailand	10.90	
18	3	Yang Zi Xian	Macau	10.91	
19	4	Pin Wanheab	Cambodia	10.93	
20	2	Mesbah Ahmmed	Bangladesh	10.99	
21	2	Pao Hin Fong	Macau	11.03	
22	1	Azneem Ahmed	Maldives	11.05	
23	3	Tilak Ram Tharu	Nepal	11.10	
24	3	Massoud Azizi	Afghanistan	11.58	
25	2	Myagmar Davaakhuu	Mongolia	11.71	
	1	Mohammad Abu Rayhan Musafa	Bangladesh	DNF	
	1	Yasir Al-Nashri	Saudi Arabia	DQ	FS
	2	Kim Kuk-young	South Korea	DQ	FS
	4	Wachara Sondee	Thailand	DQ	FS
	1	Akmyrat Orazgeldiyev	Turkmenistan	DNS	

=== Semi-finals ===
First 3 in each heat (Q) and 2 best performers (q) advanced to the final. Wind: Heat 1: -1.1 m/s, Heat 2: -0.5 m/s

Rank	Heat	Name	Nationality	Time	Notes
1	2	Barakat Al-Harthi	Oman	10.27	Q
2	2	Samuel Francis	Qatar	10.30	Q
3	2	Hassan Taftian	Iran	10.32	Q
4	1	Su Bingtian	China	10.37	Q
5	1	Reza Ghasemi	Iran	10.38	Q
6	2	Naoki Tsukahara	Japan	10.44	q
7	2	Ng Ka Fung	Hong Kong	10.47	q
8	1	Fahad Al-Subaie	Saudi Arabia	10.48	Q
9	1	Tsui Chi Ho	Hong Kong	10.52	
10	1	Aniruddh Gujjar	India	10.59	
10	2	Ali Al-Doseri	Bahrain	10.59	
12	2	Liaquat Ali	Pakistan	10.64	
13	2	Sapwaturrahman	Indonesia	10.78	
14	1	Mohamed Salman	Bahrain	10.86	
	1	Eid Abdulla Al-Kuwari	Qatar	DQ	
	1	Sota Kawatsura	Japan	DQ	

=== Final ===
Wind: -0.3 m/s

Rank	Name	Nationality	Time	Notes
1st place, gold medalist(s)	Su Bingtian	China	10.17	
2nd place, silver medalist(s)	Samuel Francis	Qatar	10.27	
3rd place, bronze medalist(s)	Barakat Al-Harthi	Oman	10.30	
4	Reza Ghasemi	Iran	10.37	
5	Fahad Al-Subaie	Saudi Arabia	10.48	
6	Ng Ka Fung	Hong Kong	10.52	
7	Naoki Tsukahara	Japan	10.54	
8	Hassan Taftian	Iran	10.54	
