= Athletics at the 2013 Islamic Solidarity Games =

Athletics competition

Athletics at the 3rd Islamic Solidarity Games
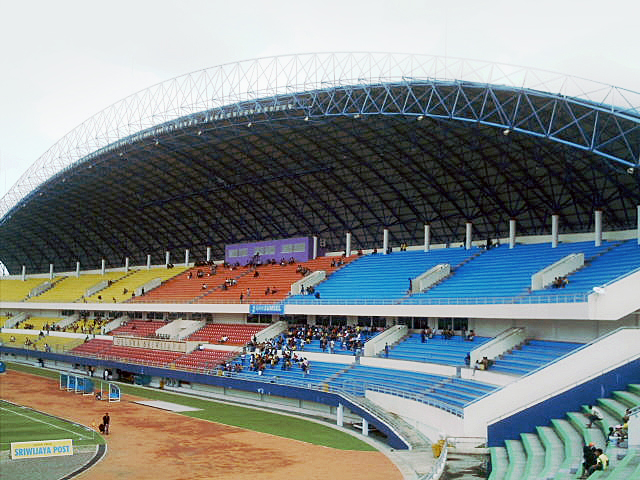
- Host stadium in Palembang.
- Dates: September 25–29, 2013
- Host city: Palembang, Indonesia
- Venue: Jakabaring Stadium
- Events: 40

The athletics competition at the 2013 Islamic Solidarity Games was held in Jaka Baring Athletic Stadium in Palembang, Indonesia from 25 to 29 September 2013.

It was the first time that women athletes competed at the Games.

== Medalists ==
=== Men ===
Event	Gold		Silver		Bronze	
100 m	Reza Ghasemi; Iran	10.29	Barakat Al-Harthi; Oman	10.34	Fahhad Al-Subaie; Saudi Arabia	10.37
200 m	Fahhad Al-Subaie; Saudi Arabia	20.74	Winston George; Guyana	20.77	Reza Ghasemi; Iran	20.96
400 m	Yousef Masrahi; Saudi Arabia	45.18	Winston George; Guyana	46.10	Miloud Laredj; Algeria	46.26
800 m	Abdulaziz Ladan; Saudi Arabia	1:43.86 GR	Musaeb Abdulrahman Balla; Qatar	1:44.19	İlham Tanui Özbilen; Turkey	1:45.65
1500 m	İlham Tanui Özbilen; Turkey	3:39.69 GR	Mohamed Moustaoui; Morocco	3:40.91	Fouad Elkaam; Morocco	3:41.20
5000 m	Hayle Ibrahimov; Azerbaijan	14:03.12 GR	Ali Kaya; Turkey	14:04.59	Othmane El Goumri; Morocco	14:07.59
10,000 m	Ali Kaya; Turkey	29:36.64	Mustapha El Aziz; Morocco	29:50.64	Hasan Mahboob; Bahrain	29:55.85
110 m hurdles	Ameer Shakir Aneed; Iraq	13.89	Shared gold		Rayzam Shah Wan Sofian; Malaysia	13.97
110 m hurdles	Abdulaziz Al-Mandeel; Kuwait	13.89	Shared gold		Rayzam Shah Wan Sofian; Malaysia	13.97
400 m hurdles	Abdelmalik Lahoulou; Algeria	50.96	Mehmet Güzel; Turkey	51.66	Andrian; Indonesia	51.82
3000 m steeplechase	Tarık Langat Akdağ; Turkey	8:28.79 GR	Hamid Ezzine; Morocco	8:37.46	Tareq Mubarak Taher; Bahrain	8:44.20
4 × 100 m relay	Oman; Fahad Al-Jabri; Barakat Al-Harthi; Abdullah Al-Sooli; Mohamed Obaid Al-Saadi	39.72 GR	Saudi Arabia; Bandar Al-Kaabi; Fahhad Al-Subaie; Humod Al-Wani; Ahmed Faiz	40.20	Indonesia; Yaspi Boby; Sapwaturrahman; Fadlin; Iswandi	40.37
4 × 400 m relay	Saudi Arabia; Ismail Al-Sabiani; Mohammed Al-Bishi; Mazen Al-Yassin; Yousef Masrahi	3:03.70 GR	Turkey; Batuhan Altıntaş; Halit Kılıç; Mehmet Güzel; İlham Tanui Özbilen	3:06.43	Algeria; Miloud Laredj; Lyes Sabri; Abdelmalik Lahoulou; Mohamed Belbachir	3:09.04
20 km walk	Mabrook Saleh Mohamed; Qatar	1:31:26	Hakmal Lisauda; Indonesia	1:34:23	Gabriel Ngnintedem; Cameroon	1:39:52
High jump	Keivan Ghanbarzadeh; Iran	2.20m =GR	Majd Eddin Ghazal; Syria	2.20m	Nauraj Singh Randhawa; Malaysia	2.18m
Pole vault	Mouhcine Cheaouri; Morocco	5.10m	Mohsen Rabbani; Iran	5.00m	Mohamed Romdhana; Tunisia	4.90m
Long jump	Ahmed Faiz; Saudi Arabia	7.80m	Mohammad Arzandeh; Iran	7.70m	Saleh Al-Haddad; Kuwait	7.66m
Triple jump	Tarik Bouguetaïb; Morocco	16.29m	Mohamed Yusuf Salman; Bahrain	15.90m	Aşkın Karaca; Turkey	15.75m
Shot put	Sultan Al-Hebshi; Saudi Arabia	18.65m	Mashari Suroor; Kuwait	18.59m	Hüseyin Atıcı; Turkey	18.56m
Discus throw	Ehsan Haddadi; Iran	66.03m GR	Mohammad Samimi; Iran	62.15m	İrfan Yıldırım; Turkey	59.97m
Hammer throw	Mostafa El Gamel; Egypt	77.73m GR	Ali Al-Zenkawi; Kuwait	76.68m	Dmitriy Marshin; Azerbaijan	70.52m
Javelin throw	Ihab Abdelrahman; Egypt	78.96m GR	Fatih Avan; Turkey	78.15m	Ahmed El-Shabramsly; Egypt	69.02m

=== Women ===
Event	Gold		Silver		Bronze	
100 m	Maryam Tousi; Iran	11.67	Nimet Karakuş; Turkey	12.11	Komalam Shally Selvaratnam; Malaysia	12.11
200 m	Maryam Tousi; Iran	23.72	Komalam Shally Selvaratnam; Malaysia	25.16	Abir Barkaoui; Tunisia	25.47
400 m	Malika Akkaoui; Morocco	53.19	Hasna Grioui; Morocco	54.88	Mariatu Suma; Sierra Leone	55.27
800 m	Malika Akkaoui; Morocco	2:06.97	Siham Hilali; Morocco	2:07.29	Tuğba Koyuncu; Turkey	2:09.17
1500 m	Rababe Arafi; Morocco	4:19.27	Siham Hilali; Morocco	4:19.79	Betlhem Desalegn; United Arab Emirates	4:20.09
5000 m	Maryam Yusuf Jamal; Bahrain	16:15.70	Betlhem Desalegn; United Arab Emirates	16:16.84	Layes Abdullayeva; Azerbaijan	16:49.08
10000 m	Shitaye Eshete; Bahrain	32:35.78	Kenza Dahmani; Algeria	33:06.41	Alia Saeed Mohamed; United Arab Emirates	33:44.12
100 m hurdles	Dedeh Erawati; Indonesia	13.54	Yamina Hjaji; Morocco	13.96	Raja Nursheena; Malaysia	13.98
400 m hurdles	Hayat Lambarki; Morocco	57.92	Lamiae Lhabze; Morocco	58.16	Özge Akın; Turkey	59.44
3000 m steeplechase	Amina Bettiche; Algeria	10:05.63	Elif Karabulut; Turkey	10:07.79	Salima Alami; Morocco	10:08.06
4 × 100 m relay	Turkey; Saliha Özyurt; Birsen Engin; Sema Apak; Nimet Karakuş	46.59	Morocco; Jamaa Chnaik; Hayat Lambarki; Lamiae Lhabze; Yamina Hjaji	47.18	Oman; Mazoon Al-Alawi; Shinoona Al-Habsi; Hiba Al-Asmi; Buthaina Al-Yaqoubi	49.20
4 × 400 m relay	Morocco; Hasna Grioui; Malika Akkaoui; Lamiae Lhabze; Hayat Lambarki	3:38.56	Turkey; Özge Akın; Birsen Engin; Esma Aydemir; Sema Apak	3:53.26	Oman; Mazoon Al-Alawi; Shinoona Al-Habsi; Hiba Al-Asmi; Buthaina Al-Yaqoubi	4:30.09
High jump	Burcu Yüksel; Turkey	1.80m	Sevim Sinmez Serbest; Turkey	1.65m	Maroua Najjar; Tunisia	1.65m
Pole vault	Buse Arıkazan; Turkey	3.95m	Elmas Seda Fırtına; Turkey	3.85m	Nisrine Dinar; Morocco	3.85m
Long jump	Jamaa Chnaik; Morocco	5.95m	Jihad Bakhechi; Morocco	5.89m	Sema Apak; Turkey	5.71m
Triple jump	Yekaterina Sariyeva; Azerbaijan	13.28m	Jamaa Chnaik; Morocco	12.99m	Jihad Bakhechi; Morocco	12.98m
Shot put	Leila Rajabi; Iran	17.02m	Eki Febri Ekawati; Indonesia	14.00m	Elçin Kaya; Turkey	13.21m
Discus throw	Elçin Kaya; Turkey	53.33m	Dwi Ratnawati; Indonesia	47.14m	Raghad Al-Zubaidi; Oman	29.64m
Javelin throw	Eki Febri Ekawati; Indonesia	34.37m	Hiba Al-Asmi; Oman	33.03m	Maroua Najjar; Tunisia	30.76m

== Medal table ==
Rank	Nation	Gold	Silver	Bronze	Total
1	Morocco (MAR)	8	11	5	24
2	Turkey (TUR)	7	9	8	24
3	Iran (IRI)	6	3	1	10
4	Saudi Arabia (KSA)	6	1	1	8
5	Indonesia (INA)	2	3	2	7
6	Algeria (ALG)	2	1	2	5
6	Bahrain (BHR)	2	1	2	5
8	Azerbaijan (AZE)	2	0	2	4
9	Egypt (EGY)	2	0	1	3
10	Oman (OMA)	1	2	3	6
11	Kuwait (KUW)	1	2	1	4
12	Qatar (QAT)	1	1	0	2
13	Iraq (IRQ)	1	0	0	1
14	Guyana (GUY)	0	2	0	2
15	Malaysia (MAS)	0	1	4	5
16	United Arab Emirates (UAE)	0	1	2	3
17	Syria (SYR)	0	1	0	1
18	Tunisia (TUN)	0	0	4	4
19	Cameroon (CMR)	0	0	1	1
19	Sierra Leone (SLE)	0	0	1	1
Totals (20 entries)		41	39	40	120
