= Masashi Eriguchi =

Japanese sprinter (born 1988)

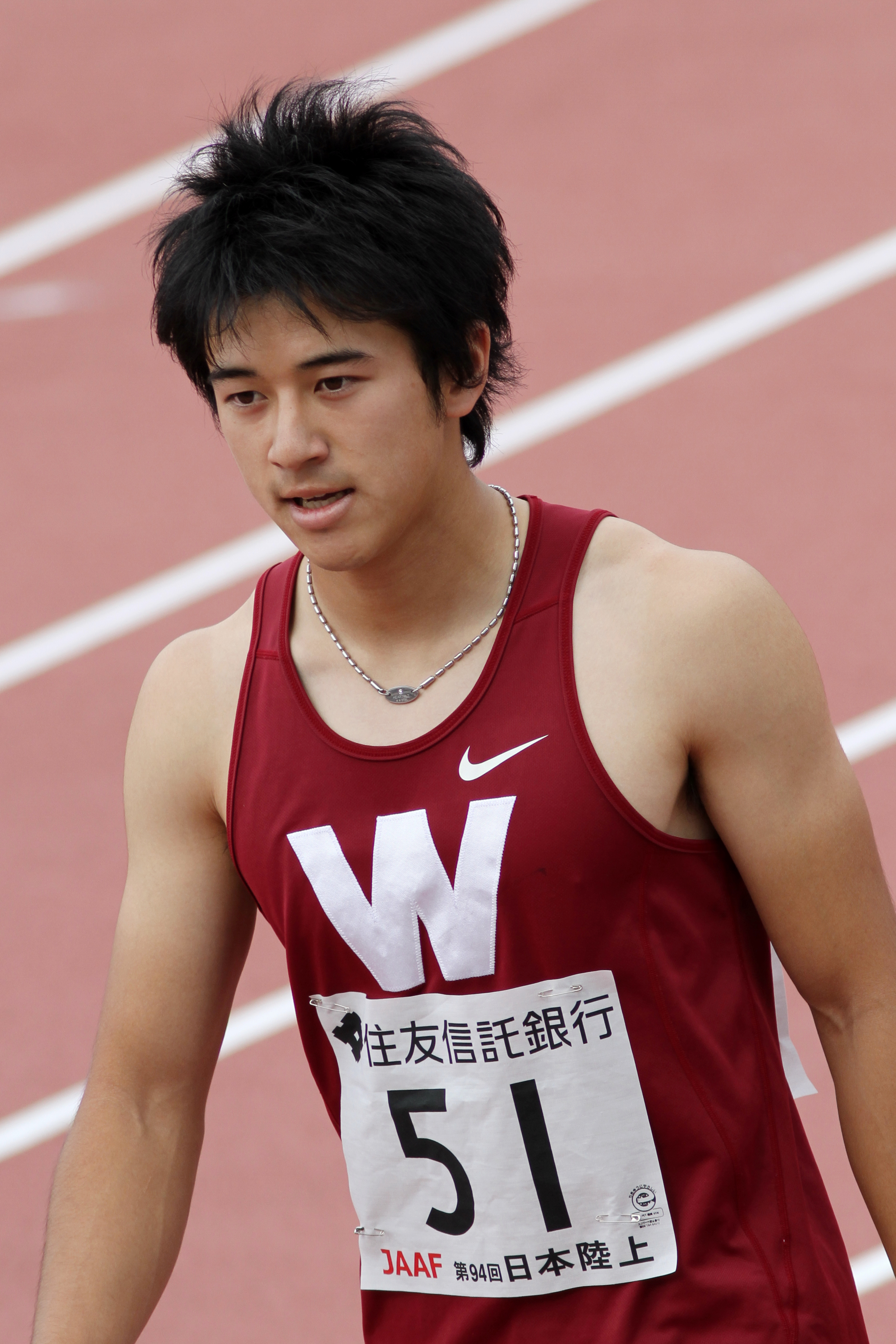
- Eriguchi at the 2010 Japan Championship

Personal information
- Nationality: Japan
- Born: 17 December 1988 (age 37) Kikuchi, Kumamoto, Japan
- Education: Waseda University
- Height: 1.70 m (5 ft 7 in)
- Weight: 62 kg (137 lb)

Sport
- Sport: Track and field
- Event: 100 metres
- Retired: 2018
- Personal best(s): 100 m: 10.07 (Hiroshima 2009) 200 m: 20.80 (Fukuroi 2012) 60 m: 6.73 (Hangzhou 2014)
Medal record
Men's athletics
Representing Japan
Asian Championships
Gold medal – first place	2009 Guangzhou	4×100 m relay
Gold medal – first place	2011 Kobe	4×100 m relay
Silver medal – second place	2011 Kobe	100 m
Universiade
Bronze medal – third place	2009 Belgrade	100 m

Masashi Eriguchi (江里口 匡史, Eriguchi Masashi; born 17 December 1988 in Kikuchi, Kumamoto) is a retired Japanese sprinter who specialized in the 100 metres.

He won the bronze medal at the 2009 Summer Universiade and a gold medal in relay at the 2009 Asian Championships. At the 2009 World Championships, he finished fourth in the relay. He also competed in the 100 metres. He reached the semi-final at the 2010 World Indoor Championships.

His personal best times are 6.75 seconds in the 60 metres (indoor), achieved at the 2010 World Indoor Championships in Doha; 10.07 seconds in the 100 metres, achieved in June 2009 in Hiroshima; and 20.88 seconds in the 200 metres, achieved in October 2008 in Ōita.

He retired in 2018.

== Personal bests ==
Event	Time (s)	Wind (m/s)	Competition	Venue	Date	Notes
Outdoor
100 m	10.07	+1.9	Japan Championship	Hiroshima, Japan	28 June 2009	Japan's 9th-fastest time
200 m	20.80	+1.0	Shizuoka International Meet	Fukuroi, Japan	03 MAY 2012	
Indoor
60 m	6.73	n/a	Japan Junior Indoor Meet	Hangzhou, China	15 February 2014	

== Records ==
- 4 × 200 m relay
  - Former Japanese and Japanese university record holder - 1:22.67 s (relay leg: 1st) (Yokohama, 27 September 2008)^{[a]}

^{a} with Yukio Yanai, Hiroshi Kihara, and Shintarō Kimura

== Competition record ==
Year	Competition	Venue	Position	Event	Notes
Representing Japan
2007	Universiade	Bangkok, Thailand	4th (h)	4 × 100 m relay	39.98 (relay leg: 4th)
2009	Universiade	Belgrade, Serbia	3rd	100 m	10.33 (wind: -0.7 m/s)
2009	Universiade	Belgrade, Serbia	– (h)	4 × 100 m relay	DQ (relay leg: 1st)
2009	World Championships	Berlin, Germany	36th (qf)	100 m	10.45 (wind: -0.7 m/s)
2009	World Championships	Berlin, Germany	4th	4 × 100 m relay	38.30 (relay leg: 1st)
2009	Asian Championships	Guangzhou, China	21st (h)	100 m	10.82 (wind: -1.0 m/s)
2009	Asian Championships	Guangzhou, China	1st	4 × 100 m relay	39.01 (relay leg: 1st)
2010	World Indoor Championships	Doha, Qatar	21st (sf)	60 m	6.77
2010	Asian Games	Guangzhou, China	15th (sf)	100 m	10.56 (wind: +0.9 m/s)
2010	Asian Games	Guangzhou, China	10th (h)	4 × 100 m relay	47.14 (relay leg: 1st)
2011	Asian Championships	Kobe, Japan	2nd	100 m	10.28 (wind: +1.8 m/s)
2011	Asian Championships	Kobe, Japan	1st	4 × 100 m relay	39.18 (relay leg: 2nd)
2012	Olympic Games	London, United Kingdom	31st (h)	100 m	10.30 (wind: +0.7 m/s)
2012	Olympic Games	London, United Kingdom	4th	4 × 100 m relay	38.35 (relay leg: 2nd)
2014	Asian Indoor Championships	Hangzhou, China	4th	60 m	6.73
2014	World Relays	Nassau, Bahamas	9th (h)	4 × 200 m relay	1:23.87 (relay leg: 2nd)

=== National Championship ===
Year	Competition	Venue	Position	Event	Notes
2007	Japan Championships	Osaka, Osaka	5th	100 m	10.53 (wind: -0.3 m/s)
2008	Japan Championships	Kawasaki, Kanagawa	7th	100 m	10.61 (wind: -0.3 m/s)
2008	Japan Championships	Yokohama, Kanagawa	1st	4 × 100 m relay	38.97 (relay leg: 1st) GR
2009	Japan Championships	Hiroshima, Hiroshima	1st	100 m	10.14 (wind: +1.9 m/s)
2010	Japan Championships	Marugame, Kagawa, Kagawa	1st	100 m	10.26 (wind: 0.0 m/s)
2011	Japan Championships	Kumagaya, Saitama	1st	100 m	10.38 (wind: -0.5 m/s)
2012	Japan Championships	Osaka, Osaka	1st	100 m	10.29 (wind: 0.0 m/s)
2013	Japan Championships	Chōfu, Tokyo	9th (h)	100 m	10.42 (wind: +0.3 m/s)
2014	Japan Championships	Fukushima, Fukushima	6th	100 m	10.37 (wind: +0.6 m/s)
