= Athletics at the 2012 Summer Olympics – Men's 4 × 100 metres relay =

Men's 4 × 100 metre relay at the Games of the XXX Olympiad
- Venue: Olympic Stadium
- Date: 10–11 August
- Teams: 16
- Winning time: 36.84 WR

Medalists
1st place, gold medalist(s)		Nesta Carter; Michael Frater; Yohan Blake; Usain Bolt	Jamaica
2nd place, silver medalist(s)		Keston Bledman; Marc Burns; Emmanuel Callender; Richard Thompson	Trinidad and Tobago
3rd place, bronze medalist(s)		Jimmy Vicaut; Christophe Lemaitre; Pierre-Alexis Pessonneaux; Ronald Pognon	France

Official Video

The men's 4 × 100 metres relay competition at the 2012 Summer Olympics in London, England, was held at the Olympic Stadium on 10–11 August.

== Overview ==
On 11 August, the Jamaican national team, led by Nesta Carter, Michael Frater, Yohan Blake, and Usain Bolt, won the gold medal and broke their own world record of 37.04 set at the 2011 World Championships in Athletics, with a time of 36.84.

Carter did not start well, and Trell Kimmons of the United States led the first 100 metres. Kimmons handed the baton to former world champion and Olympic champion Justin Gatlin, who was in the lead. By the third changeover, America had a slight lead over the Jamaicans, but when Michael Frater handed over to Yohan Blake, Blake took the final bend and made up ground and overtook Tyson Gay of the US. Blake then passed the baton to Bolt slightly ahead of Gay's pass to Ryan Bailey. In the final 100 metres, Bolt extended that lead to a few metres and crossed the line in a new world-record time for his country for the second consecutive Olympics, with the US finishing second. Although the Canadian team finished third, they were disqualified after third leg runner Jared Connaughton stepped on a line, and the bronze medal went to Trinidad and Tobago.

While the Jamaican team were breaking the world record, the American team crossed the line in exactly the same time as the previous record of 37.04 seconds, setting a new national record.

In May 2014, the United States Anti-Doping Agency imposed a one-year suspension on a 4 × 100 m relay team member Tyson Gay. In May 2015, the International Olympic Committee formally requested the United States Olympic Committee to collect the medals from teammates Trell Kimmons, Justin Gatlin, Ryan Bailey, Jeff Demps, and Darvis Patton. The medals were reallocated, with Trinidad and Tobago awarded silver, and France the bronze.

== Records ==
Prior to the competition, the existing World and Olympic records were as follows.

World record	Jamaica (Nesta Carter, Michael Frater, Yohan Blake, Usain Bolt)	37.04	Daegu, South Korea	4 September 2011
Olympic record	United States (Michael Marsh, Leroy Burrell, Dennis Mitchell, Carl Lewis)	37.40	Barcelona, Spain	8 August 1992
2012 world leading	(Jamaica) Racers Track Club (Mario Forsythe, Yohan Blake, Kimmari Roach, Usain Bolt)	37.82	Kingston, Jamaica	14 April 2012

The following records were established during the competition:

Date	Event	Name	Nationality	Time	Record
11 August	Final	Nesta Carter, Michael Frater, Yohan Blake, Usain Bolt	Jamaica	36.84	WR, OR
10 August	Round 1	Brian Mariano, Churandy Martina, Giovanni Codrington, Patrick van Luijk	Netherlands	38.29	NR
10 August	Round 1	Guo Fan, Liang Jiahong, Su Bingtian, Zhang Peimeng	China	38.38	NR
10 August	Round 1	Lestrod Roland, Jason Rogers, Antoine Adams, Brijesh Lawrence	Saint Kitts and Nevis	38.41	NR
10 August	Round 1	Anthony Alozie, Isaac Ntiamoah, Andrew McCabe, Josh Ross	Australia	38.17	=AR
10 August	Round 1	Kamil Masztak, Dariusz Kuć, Robert Kubaczyk, Kamil Kryński	Poland	38.31	NR

== Schedule ==
All times are British Summer Time (UTC+1)

Date	Time	Round
Friday, 10 August 2012	19:45	Round 1
Saturday, 11 August 2012	21:00	Finals

== Result ==
=== Round 1 ===
Qual. rule: first 3 of each heat (Q) plus the 2 fastest times (q) qualified.

Official Video of Round 1

==== Heat 1 ====
Rank	Lane	Nation	Competitors	Time	Notes
1	6	Jamaica	Nesta Carter, Michael Frater, Yohan Blake, Kemar Bailey-Cole	37.39	Q, SB
2	3	Canada	Gavin Smellie, Oluseyi Smith, Jared Connaughton, Justyn Warner	38.05	Q, SB
3	7	Netherlands	Brian Mariano, Churandy Martina, Giovanni Codrington, Patrick van Luijk	38.29	Q, NR
4	8	Brazil	Aldemir da Silva Junior, Sandro Viana, Nilson Andre, Bruno de Barros	38.35	SB
5	5	China	Guo Fan, Liang Jiahong, Su Bingtian, Zhang Peimeng	38.38	NR
6	4	Saint Kitts and Nevis	Lestrod Roland, Jason Rogers, Antoine Adams, Brijesh Lawrence	38.41	NR
7	9	Italy	Simone Collio, Jacques Riparelli, Davide Manenti, Fabio Cerutti	38.58	SB
	2	Great Britain	Christian Malcolm, Dwain Chambers, Danny Talbot, Adam Gemili	DQ (37.93)	Out of Zone

==== Heat 2 ====
Rank	Lane	Nation	Competitors	Time	Notes
1	7	United States	Jeff Demps, Darvis Patton, Trell Kimmons, Justin Gatlin	37.38	Q, NR
2	9	Japan	Ryota Yamagata, Masashi Eriguchi, Shinji Takahira, Shota Iizuka	38.07	Q, SB
3	4	Trinidad and Tobago	Richard Thompson, Marc Burns, Emmanuel Callender, Keston Bledman	38.10	Q, SB
4	5	France	Jimmy Vicaut, Christophe Lemaitre, Pierre-Alexis Pessonneaux, Ronald Pognon	38.15	q
5	2	Australia	Anthony Alozie, Isaac Ntiamoah, Andrew McCabe, Josh Ross	38.17	q, =AR
6	3	Poland	Kamil Masztak, Dariusz Kuć, Robert Kubaczyk, Kamil Kryński	38.31	NR
7	6	Germany	Julian Reus, Tobias Unger, Alexander Kosenkow, Lucas Jakubczyk	38.37	
8	8	Hong Kong	Tang Yik Chun, Lai Chun Ho, Ng Ka Fung, Tsui Chi Ho	38.61	

== Final ==
Results of the Final:

Rank	Lane	Nation	Competitors	Time	Notes
1st place, gold medalist(s)	6	Jamaica	Nesta Carter, Michael Frater, Yohan Blake, Usain Bolt	36.84	WR, OR
2nd place, silver medalist(s)	9	Trinidad and Tobago	Keston Bledman, Marc Burns, Emmanuel Callender, Richard Thompson	38.12	
3rd place, bronze medalist(s)	3	France	Jimmy Vicaut, Christophe Lemaitre, Pierre-Alexis Pessonneaux, Ronald Pognon	38.16	
4	4	Japan	Ryota Yamagata, Masashi Eriguchi, Shinji Takahira, Shota Iizuka	38.35	
5	8	Netherlands	Brian Mariano, Churandy Martina, Giovanni Codrington, Patrick van Luijk	38.39	
6	2	Australia	Anthony Alozie, Isaac Ntiamoah, Andrew McCabe, Joshua Ross	38.43	
	5	Canada	Gavin Smellie, Oluseyi Smith, Jared Connaughton, Justyn Warner	DQ (38.07)	R 163.3a
	7	United States	Trell Kimmons, Justin Gatlin, Tyson Gay, Ryan Bailey	DQ (37.04)	Doping
