= Reza Ghasemi =

Iranian sprinter (born 1987)

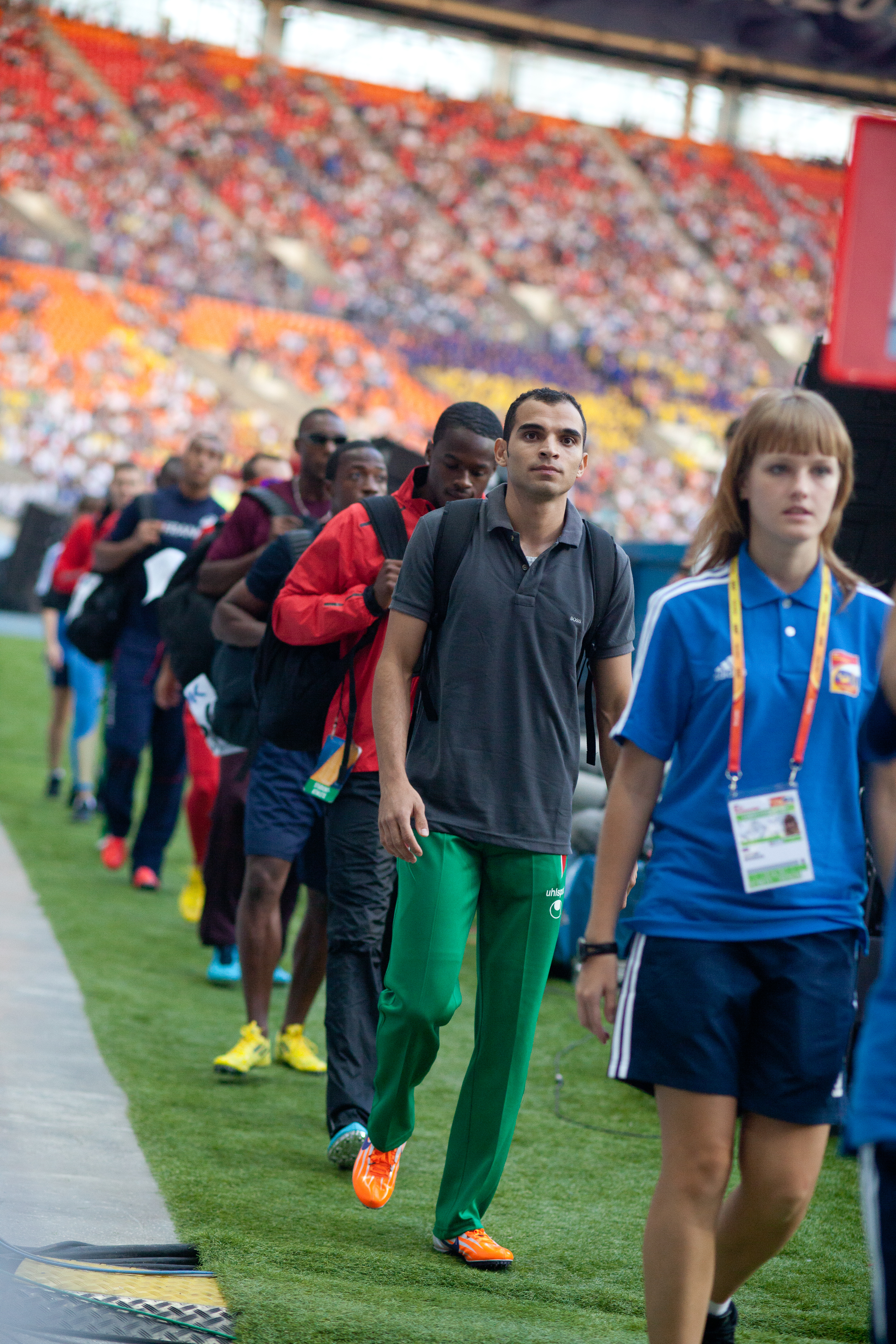
- Reza Ghasemi (gray T-shirt) at the 2013 World Championships

Personal information
- Native name: رضا قاسمی
- Born: 24 July 1987 (age 39) Isfahan, Iran
- Height: 1.79 m (5 ft 10 in)
- Weight: 76 kg (168 lb)

Sport
- Sport: Track and field
- Event: Sprints
- Club: Naft
Medal record
Men's athletics
Representing Iran
Asian Championships
| Bronze medal – third place | 2015 Wuhan | 100 m |
Asian Indoor Championships
| Gold medal – first place | 2012 Hangzhou | 60 m |
| Silver medal – second place | 2010 Tehran | 60 m |
| Silver medal – second place | 2016 Doha | 60 m |
| Silver medal – second place | 2016 Doha | 4×400 m relay |
| Bronze medal – third place | 2014 Hangzhou | 60 m |
Asian Beach Games
| Silver medal – second place | 2014 Phuket | 60 m |
Islamic Solidarity Games
| Gold medal – first place | 2013 Palembang | 100 m |
| Bronze medal – third place | 2013 Palembang | 200 m |

Reza Ghasemi (Persian: رضا قاسمی; born 24 July 1987 in Isfahan) is an Iranian sprinter who won the 60-metre event at the 2012 Asian Indoor Athletics Championships and also ran at the 2012 Summer Olympics, two outdoor world championships and three indoor.

== Personal life ==
On 12 January 2026, Ghasemi publicly supported the 2025–2026 Iranian protests by stating: "History will write that the criminal Khamenei regime shed the blood of innocent people in the streets."

== International competitions ==
| Year | Competition | Venue | Position | Event | Notes |
Representing Iran
| 2010 | Asian Indoor Championships | Tehran, Iran | 2nd | 60 m | 6.67 |
| 2010 | World Indoor Championships | Doha, Qatar | 22nd (sf) | 60 m | 6.80 |
| 2011 | Asian Championships | Kobe, Japan | 9th (sf) | 100 m | 10.64 |
| 2011 | Asian Championships | Kobe, Japan | 7th | 200 m | 21.18 |
| 2011 | Universiade | Shenzhen, China | 11th (sf) | 100 m | 10.39 |
| 2011 | Universiade | Shenzhen, China | 6th | 200 m | 20.88 |
| 2012 | Asian Indoor Championships | Hangzhou, China | 1st | 60 m | 6.68 |
| 2012 | World Indoor Championships | Istanbul, Turkey | 17th (sf) | 60 m | 6.79 |
| 2012 | Olympic Games | London, United Kingdom | 34th (h) | 100 m | 10.31 |
| 2012 | West Asian Championships | Dubai, United Arab Emirates | 2nd | 100 m | 10.43 |
| 2012 | West Asian Championships | Dubai, United Arab Emirates | 1st | 200 m | 21.04 |
| 2012 | West Asian Championships | Dubai, United Arab Emirates | 1st | 4 × 100 m | 40.26 |
| 2013 | Asian Championships | Pune, India | 4th | 100 m | 10.37 |
| 2013 | Asian Championships | Pune, India | 4th | 200 m | 20.98 |
| 2013 | World Championships | Moscow, Russia | 41st (h) | 100 m | 10.46 |
| 2013 | Islamic Solidarity Games | Palembang, Indonesia | 1st | 100 m | 10.29 |
| 2013 | Islamic Solidarity Games | Palembang, Indonesia | 3rd | 200 m | 20.96 |
| 2014 | Asian Indoor Championships | Hangzhou, China | 3rd | 60 m | 6.68 |
| 2014 | Asian Indoor Championships | Hangzhou, China | 4th | 4 × 400 m | 3:13.55 |
| 2014 | World Indoor Championships | Sopot, Poland | 14th (sf) | 60 m | 6.62 |
| 2014 | Asian Games | Incheon, South Korea | 5th | 100 m | 10.25 |
| 2014 | Asian Beach Games | Phuket, Thailand | 2nd | 60 m | 7.17 |
| 2015 | Asian Championships | Wuhan, China | 3rd | 100 m | 10.19 |
| 2015 | Asian Championships | Wuhan, China | 6th | 200 m | 21.08 |
| 2015 | World Championships | Beijing, China | 34th (h) | 100 m | 10.25 |
| 2015 | Military World Games | Mungyeong, South Korea | 2nd | 100 m | 10.18 |
| 2015 | Military World Games | Mungyeong, South Korea | 11th (h) | 200 m | 21.31^{1} |
| 2015 | Military World Games | Mungyeong, South Korea | – | 4 × 400 m | DQ |
| 2016 | Asian Indoor Championships | Doha, Qatar | 2nd | 60 m | 6.66 |
| 2016 | Asian Indoor Championships | Doha, Qatar | 2nd | 4 × 400 m | 3:11.86 |
| 2016 | Olympic Games | Rio de Janeiro, Brazil | 58th (h) | 100 m | 10.47 |
| 2016 | Asian Beach Games | Danang, Vietnam | 2nd | 60 m | 6.55 |
| 2017 | Asian Indoor and Martial Arts Games | Ashgabat, Turkmenistan | 3rd | 60 m | 6.64 |
| 2018 | Asian Indoor Championships | Tehran, Iran | 4th | 60 m | 6.71 |

^{1}Did not start in the semifinals

== Personal bests ==
Outdoor

- 100 metres – 10.12 (+0.4 m/s, Almaty 2015)
- 200 metres – 20.68 (+0.4 m/s, Almaty 2015)

Indoor

- 60 metres – 6.58 (Sopot 2014
