= Su Bingtian =

Chinese sprinter (born 1989)

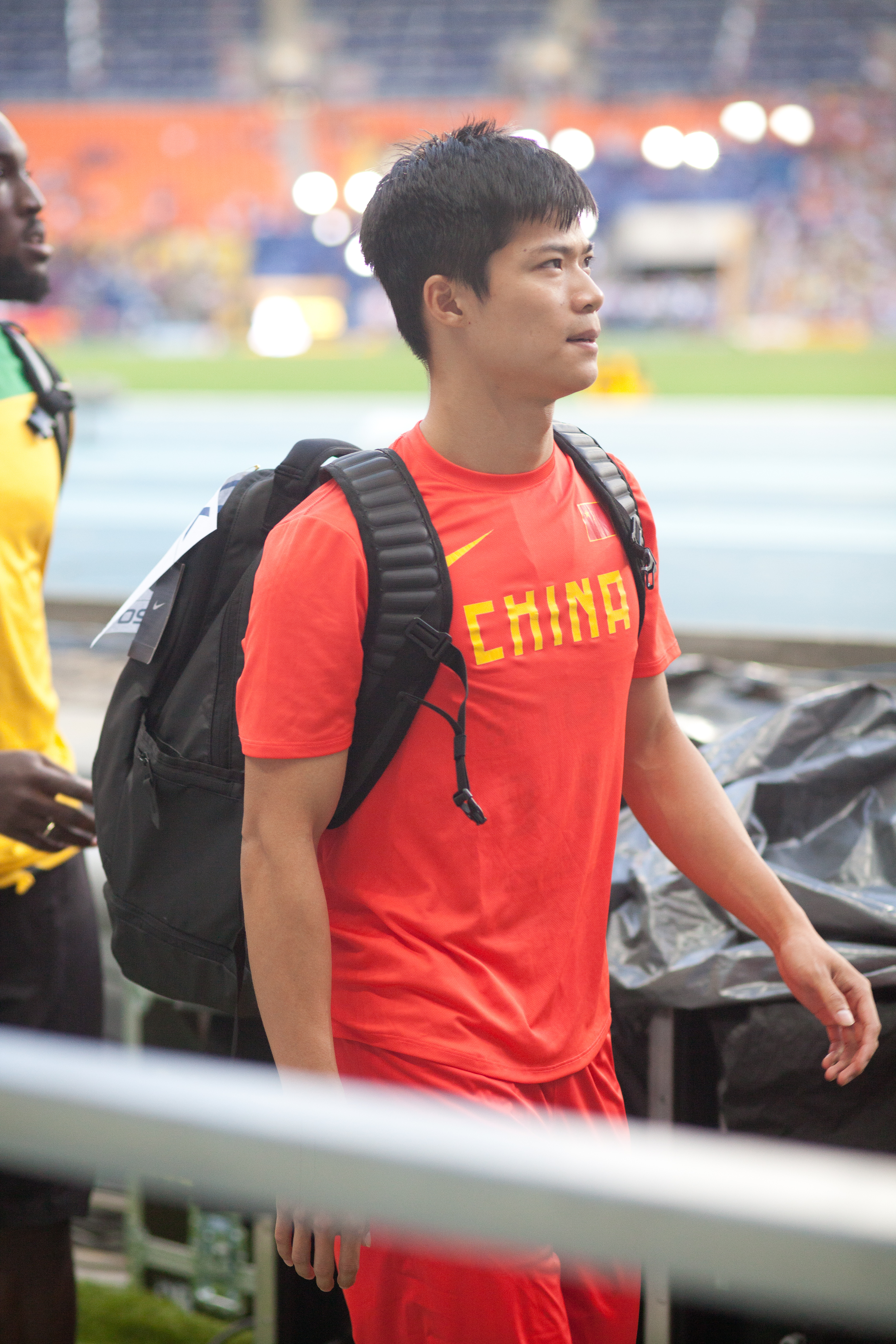
- Su at the 2013 World Championships

Personal information
- Born: 29 August 1989 (age 37) Guzhen, Guangdong, China
- Height: 1.72 m (5 ft 8 in)

Sport
- Sport: Track and field
- Events: 60 m, 100 m, 4×100 m relay
- Coached by: Randy Huntington

Achievements and titles
- Personal bests: 60 m: 6.42 AR (Birmingham 2018); 100 m: 9.83 AR (Tokyo 2021); 200 m: 21.15 (La Chaux-de-Fonds 2019)
Medal record
Men's athletics
Representing China
Event	1st	2nd	3rd
Olympic Games	0	0	1
World Championships	0	1	0
World Relays	0	0	1
World Indoor Championships	0	1	0
World Indoor Tour	1	0	0
Asian Games	3	1	1
Asian Championships	3	1	1
Continental Cup	0	1	0
Universiade	0	0	1
Total	7	5	5
Olympic Games
Bronze medal – third place	2020 Tokyo	4×100m relay
World Championships
Silver medal – second place	2015 Beijing	4×100m relay
World Relays
Bronze medal – third place	2017 Nassau	4×100m relay
World Indoor Championships
Silver medal – second place	2018 Birmingham	60 m
World Indoor Tour
Winner	2018	60 m
Asian Games
Gold medal – first place	2010 Guangzhou	4×100m relay
Gold medal – first place	2014 Incheon	4×100m relay
Gold medal – first place	2018 Jakarta	100 m
Silver medal – second place	2014 Incheon	100 m
Bronze medal – third place	2018 Jakarta	4×100m relay
Asian Championships
Gold medal – first place	2011 Kobe	100 m
Gold medal – first place	2013 Pune	100 m
Gold medal – first place	2015 Wuhan	4×100m relay
Silver medal – second place	2009 Guangzhou	4×100m relay
Bronze medal – third place	2013 Pune	4×100m relay
Continental Cup
Silver medal – second place	2018 Ostrava	100 m
Universiade
Bronze medal – third place	2011 Shenzhen	100 m

Su Bingtian
- Simplified Chinese: 苏炳添
- Traditional Chinese: 蘇炳添
Transcriptions
Standard Mandarin
- Hanyu Pinyin: Sū Bǐngtiān
- Bopomofo: ㄙㄨ ㄅㄧㄥˇ ㄊㄧㄢ
- Gwoyeu Romatzyh: Su Biingtian
- Wade–Giles: Su^{1} Ping^{3}-tʻien^{1}
- Tongyong Pinyin: Su Bǐng-tian
- Yale Romanization: Sū Bǐngtyān
- MPS2: Sū Bǐng-tiān
- IPA: [sú pìŋ.tʰjɛ́n]
Yue: Cantonese
- Yale Romanization: Sōu Bíngtīm
- Jyutping: sou1 bing2 tim1
- Canton Romanization: Sou^{1} Bing^{2}tim^{1}
- Hong Kong Romanisation: Sou Ping Tim
- IPA: [sɔw˥ pɪŋ˧˥ tʰim˥]

Su Bingtian (Chinese: 苏炳添; pinyin: Sū Bǐngtiān; born 29 August 1989) is a Chinese former track and field athlete specializing in the 100 metres event. He was the first-ever Asian-born sprinter to break the 10-second barrier and remains the only Asian sprinter to ever break 9.9 seconds. Su's personal best of 9.83 seconds makes him the all-time 10th-fastest man in the history of 100 metres at the Olympics, the all-time 19th-fastest man in the history of the 100 m event, and the current holder of the 100 m Asian record. Su's personal best in the 60 metres of 6.42 seconds placed him within the all-time top six in the event.

At the 2020 Tokyo Olympics, Su made history by becoming the first sprinter of non-African descent to reach the Olympic 100 m final since 1980. In the semi-final, as well as setting his 100 m personal best (9.83), Su also ran the fastest 30 m and 60 m ever recorded under any conditions (3.73 and 6.29 seconds). Su was a silver medalist at the World Indoor Championships in 2018, the gold medalist at the 2018 Asian Games 100 m, a silver medalist in the 4 × 100 m relay at the World Relays in 2015, and a bronze medalist in the 4 × 100 m relay at the 2020 Tokyo Olympics.

== Early life ==
Su was born on 29 August 1989, in Zhongshan village, Guangdong province, China. His parents farmed their family lands in 1980s China. Even after Su later achieved national renown, his father continued to work as a security guard and his mother worked as a nanny. Su was first exposed to track and field training in middle school, after being scouted by his PE teacher who saw him touching the basketball board with ease while being only 1.50 m (4 ft 11 in) tall. His middle school didn't have any specialized sprint coaches besides a PE teacher. Even so, he was a back-up sprinter doing mostly managerial preparatory work for the track team throughout and did not compete until 9th grade. Despite not having formal training, he ran a time (11.72) just 0.01 seconds slower than the best sprinter in the city district. Su was passed on and deemed an untalented sprinter in numerous occasions by the coaches of the city-level track and field team.

It was also during middle school that Su met his wife Yanfang Lin, whom he described as "his life-long best friend and love of his life."

== Career ==
=== Early career ===
Su's career started with his entry into the Guangdong provincial track and field team in China, known for its history of producing outstanding national-level Chinese short distance sprinters and warm weather year-round which is conducive to outdoor track training. His first professional track coach and mentor Yuan Guoqiang was the first Chinese 100 m national record holder in the early 80s at the start of digital-timing era and was a short (5'6) sprinter himself. When Su's admittance into Guangdong Dong track and field team was met with initial resistance by other coaches, Yuan Guoqiang took special notice of Su's personality, stride frequency and stride tempo, whom other coaches easily passed on and overlooked for his supposed lack of talent due to Su's short stature at the time. According to Yuan, Su was "methodical, professional, absolutely concentrated, and an intelligent runner. Few athletes I coached were as committed as he was to the sports".

Su broke onto the continental scene with three straight wins in the 100 metres on the Asian Grand Prix series in May 2009. His first medal came in the 4 × 100 metres relay at the 11th Chinese Games later that year, where he helped the Guangdong team including Liang Jiahong and Wen Yongyi to the gold medal.

He also began representing China internationally that year and shortly after the National Games he won the gold medal over 60 metres at the 2009 Asian Indoor Games, running a personal best of 6.65 seconds. He was selected for the relay at the 2009 Asian Athletics Championships and won a silver medal alongside Guo Fan, Liang Jiahong and Zhang Peimeng. He took the individual 100 m title at the East Asian Games, defeating Japanese rival Shintaro Kimura.

He equalled the Chinese indoor record in the 60 m in Chengdu in 2010, running 6.58 seconds. At the 2010 Asian Games he won the relay gold with a national and Games record time.

During March 2011, Su set a new Chinese national 60 metres indoor record in Chengdu with a time of 6.56 seconds. He went on to establish himself as his country's top male sprinter that year: he won the 100 m title at the 2011 Asian Athletics Championships in a personal best of 10.21 seconds, was the bronze medalist at the 2011 Summer Universiade, then competed at the 2011 World Championships in Athletics in Daegu (running in the heats of the relay). He ended the season by breaking the Chinese record to win the 100 m at the Chinese Athletics Championships with a time of 10.16 seconds, improving upon Zhou Wei and Chen Haijian's former best mark.

In 2012, Su qualified for the 2012 IAAF World Indoor Championships, marking his first participation in an indoor IAAF World Championships. Su subsequently reached the semi-final of the 60 m at the 2012 IAAF World Indoor Championships. Later that year, Su also became a 100 m semi-finalist at the 2012 Summer Olympics. He ran a wind-aided (+2.9 m/s) 10.04 seconds at the start of the outdoor season and ended it by defending his national title in the 100 m. With the Chinese relay team he ran national records twice that season, timing 38.71 seconds in May and improving to 38.38 seconds with Guo Fan, Liang Jiahong and Zhang Peimeng in the heats of the Olympics.

His 2013 began with two 60 m national records in Nanjing, where he ran 6.56 seconds and then 6.55 seconds. Zhang Peimeng beat Su's 100 m national record in May 2013, but Su quickly responded with a personal best of 10.06 seconds at the IAAF World Challenge Beijing.

Later that year, Su qualified for the 2013 IAAF World Championships, marking his first participation in an outdoor IAAF World Championships in an individual event. On 10 August 2013, Su raced in the sixth heat of the first round in the 100 metres, subsequently qualifying to the semi-finals by clocking 10.16 seconds. The following day, he was drawn into the first semi-final against former world champion Justin Gatlin. Su was disqualified in the race due to his false start, thereby rendering him unable to progress to the finals. Su's compatriot Zhang Peimeng also once again replaced Su as the 100 m national record holder, by clocking a time of 10.00 seconds in the semi-finals of the 2013 IAAF World Championships.

=== 2014 ===
Starting from 2014, Su Bingtian was part of the Chinese Track and Field initiative led by its national head coach Yuan Guoqiang (Su's early mentor and provincial coach in Guangdong Track and Field team) that 1) sent its top track athletes to USA for more systematic and scientific training in order to be competitive internationally 2) hired competent foreign track coaches to coach locally at China. They trained at the IMF Academy Track & Field and Cross Country located at Florida. Su's aim was to break 10 second barrier through participating in this initiative.

It was through this initiative that Su first met his later mentor and coach Randy Huntington, who was responsible for coaching Chinese national team of long jumpers at the time in China. Their encounter was not pre-planned. It was by coincidence that Randy Huntington chanced upon Su's training nearby. Su's decision to change his starting leg was a reaction to Randy Huntington's suggestion. Randy performed a test on Su by pushing him randomly when he was not prepared, and the first step Su took in reaction to this push was taken by his right one. Randy suggested he changed his starting leg to the right one for that would fit Su's natural neurological pattern better. The aim was to change his entire 100 m pace and allow him suffer from less de-acceleration after the first 60 m while maintaining his advantage at explosive start in the first half of the race. At the beginning of his transition to change starting leg, Su was for a time even slower out of block than a female sprinter when he trained at IMF Academy after he returned to USA. His first 60 m race after implementing the change was only 6.71 and his 100 m best was 10.80.

Yuan Guoqiang said that Su was so obsessed with perfecting his start at the time that he would work on his block start even when he was taking a walk, woke up in the middle of the night and contemplated why he couldn't perform the move as well as other world class athletes, and he would proceed to discuss the matter with his teammate Xie Zhenye.

=== 2015 ===
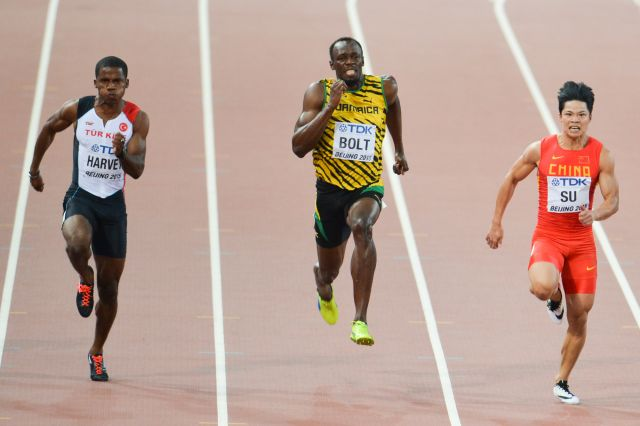
Su racing Usain Bolt and Jak Ali Harvey at the 2015 IAAF World Championships

On 30 May 2015, at the Prefontaine Classic in Eugene, Oregon, Su clocked a historic 9.99 seconds in the 100 m, becoming the first Asian-born sprinter to achieve a sub-10 second clocking. Su's historic sub-10 second clocking allowed him once again to regain the 100 m national record from compatriot Zhang Peimeng, ending their national record 'tug-of-war' which had begun in 2013. Su's coach Yuan Guoqiang later stated that: "Zhang Peimeng's 10.00 national record set at the World Championships in Moscow has given him (Su) more courage; it convinced him (Su) even more that a sub-10 clocking was not an impossible mission for Chinese athletes."

Later that year, Su qualified for the 2015 IAAF World Championships which were held in his home country of China. On 22 August 2015, Su raced in the first heat of the first round of the 100 metres finishing second behind Asafa Powell in 10.03 seconds. The following day, he was drawn in the first semi-final against defending champion Usain Bolt. Su finished in fourth clocking a time of 9.986 seconds tying Jimmy Vicaut's time in the third semi-final; since they were tied for the eighth-fastest time, they were both entered into the final, marking the first-ever nine-man final in World Championship history. Su then raced in the final, finishing 9th with a time of 10.06 seconds. Su subsequently became the first ever Asian-born athlete to run in a 100 m World Championship final.

On 29 August 2015, Su raced with his teammates Mo Youxue, Xie Zhenye and Zhang Peimeng in the 4 × 100 metres relay. Running the third leg, Su aided his team to a third-place finish in the heats, qualifying them for the final with a then Asian record time of 37.92 seconds. In the final, the Chinese team crossed the line in third behind the United States and Jamaica in 38.01 seconds, giving them a Bronze Medal finish. However, subsequent disqualification of the United States due to improper baton exchange meant that the Chinese team were promoted to a Silver medal finish in the Bird's Nest Stadium; with their Bronze being awarded to Canada.

=== 2016 ===
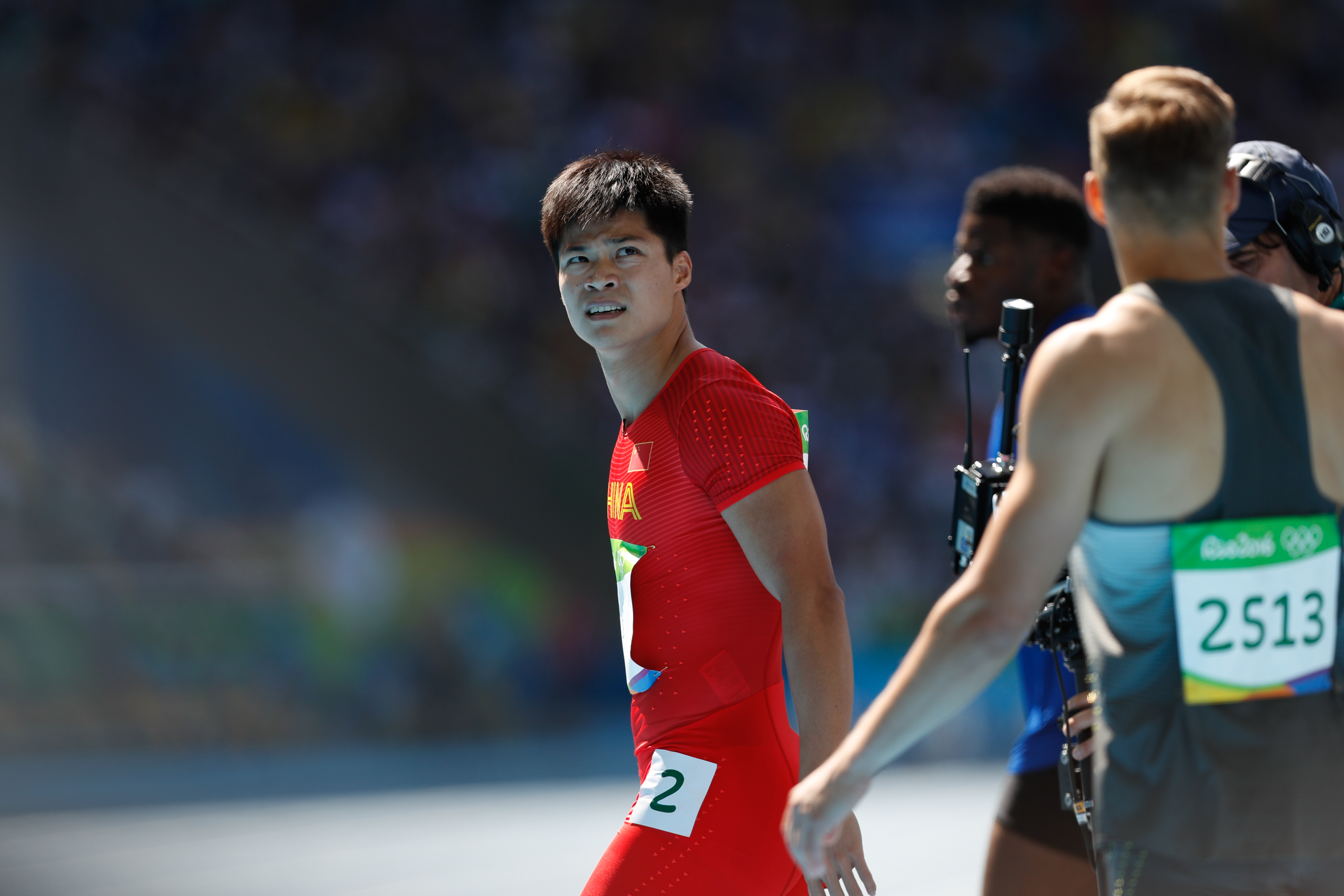
Su at the 2016 Summer Olympics

With his eyes on the 2016 Summer Olympics, Su began the year by running the 60 metres at various indoor meets in the US, ultimately qualifying for the 2016 IAAF World Indoor Championships in Portland, Oregon. On 18 March 2016, Su won his 60 metres heat at the championships with a time of 6.64 seconds. Later in the day, Su finished second in his semi-final clocking 6.50 seconds; a new personal best and equalling the Asian record. He went on to finish fifth in the final with a time of 6.54 seconds.

Outdoors, Su ran only three meets before the Olympics. He and his teammates ran and won two 4 × 100 metre relay races in his home country of China; one in Shanghai at the Shanghai Golden Grand Prix; and one in Beijing at the IAAF World Challenge Beijing. On 26 May 2016, Su finished seventh in 100 metres at the 2016 Prefontaine Classic in a wind-aided 10.04 seconds, unable to repeat the success he had on the same track the year before.

Su arrived in Rio de Janeiro for the Olympic Games, having qualified for the 100 metres and the 4 × 100 metres relay. In the 100 metres, Su finished third in his heat in 10.17 seconds, qualifying him as one of the fastest losers for the semi-final. The following day, on August 14, 2016, Su finished fourth in his semi-final in 10.08 seconds; a season's best time. However, his time was unable to qualify him for the final. 4 days later, on 18 August 2016, Su raced with his teammates Tang Xingqiang, Xie Zhenye and Zhang Peimeng in the heats of the 4 × 100 metre relay. Running the third leg, Su helped his team to a second-place finish in their heat behind the United States. Their time of 37.82 seconds set a new Asian record for the event. The following day, the Chinese team finished fourth in the final following a disqualification by team USA, narrowly missing out on an Olympic medal. Su ended his season after the Olympics.

=== 2017 ===
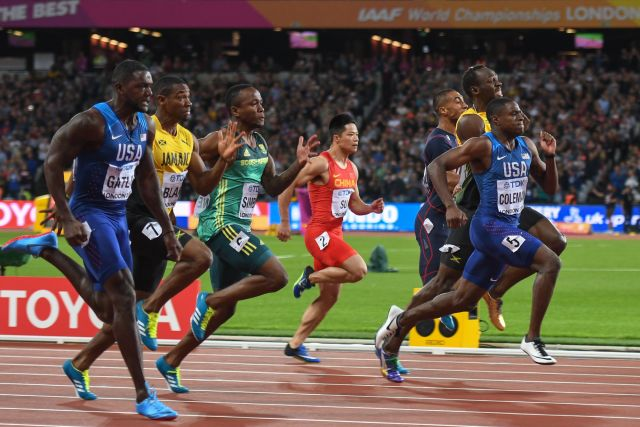
Su in the 100 m final of the 2017 IAAF World Championships

On 27 May 2017, Su once again achieved a sub-10 second time in the 100 m at the 2017 Prefontaine Classic with a personal best 9.92 seconds. However, the tailwind (+2.4 m/s) was above the allowed limit of 2.0 m/s, invalidating the time as an official national record or personal best.

Later that year, Su qualified for the 2017 IAAF World Championships. On 4 August 2017, Su raced in the fourth heat of the first round in the 100 metres subsequently qualifying to the semi-finals by clocking 10.03 seconds. The following day, he was drawn in the second semi-final against former world champion Yohan Blake. Su finished in third clocking a time of 10.10 seconds putting him through to the final where he subsequently finished 8th with a time of 10.27 seconds.

=== 2018 ===
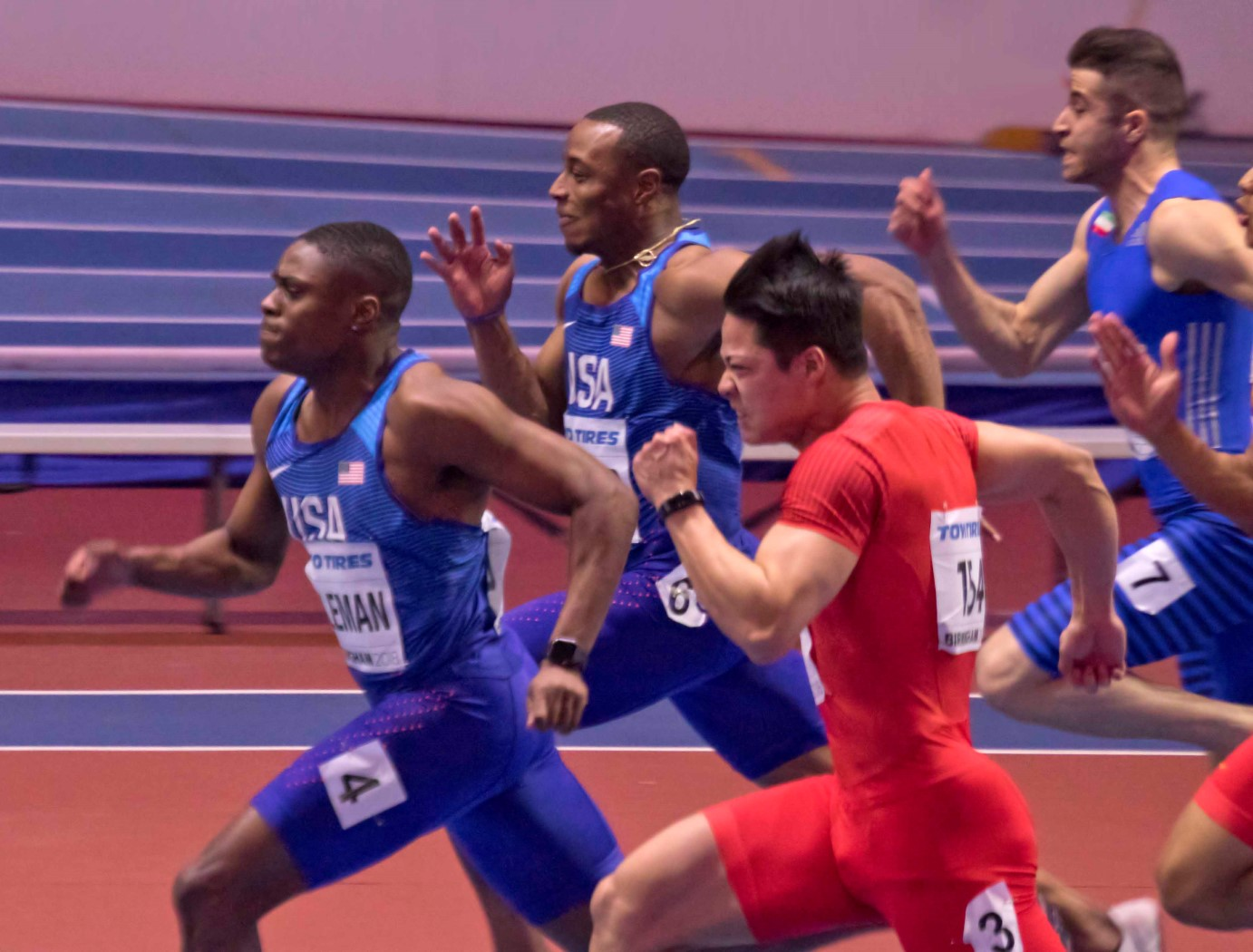
Su at the 2018 IAAF World Indoor Championships

Various stellar performances by Su Bingtian in 2018 made it a historically significant year for Chinese athletics.

On 3 March 2018, Su made history by becoming the first male Chinese sprinter to win an individual IAAF World Indoor Championships medal, as he took silver in the 2018 edition's men's 60 metres final. Su's 6.42 second performance in the event made him the current holder of the 60 m Asian record; it also places Su within the top 6 of all-time 60 metres performances.

On 22 June 2018, Su took gold in the men's 100 metres final of the 2018 IAAF World Challenge meet in Madrid with a historic 9.91 seconds; tying the Asian record previously set by Nigerian-born Qatari Femi Ogunode. Su's result of 9.91 seconds also simultaneously allowed him to regain his 100 m national record which compatriot Xie Zhenye had broken only three days earlier with a time of 9.97 seconds. One week later, Su continued his fantastic form by equalling his 9.91-second Asian record at the 2018 Meeting de Paris.

On 26 August 2018, Su won the gold medal in the men's 100 metres event at the 2018 Asian Games. He won the event with a time of 9.92 seconds breaking the Asian Games record previously set by Femi Ogunode at the 2014 Asian Games.

Representing team Asia-Pacific, Su capped off his record-breaking year with a silver medal in the 2018 IAAF Continental Cup men's 100 m final. Su finished 0.02 seconds behind team Americas representative Noah Lyles, with a time of 10.03 seconds.

Reflecting on his 2018 performances, Su remarked the following: "It is really a miraculous and amazing year for me, the most memorable one in my career. I achieved a series of good results, and most importantly, I made such results in competing with the best sprinters in the world, which was quite a boost to my confidence."

=== 2019 ===
At the end of 2018, Su made it known that his sights were now set on breaking the 9.90 second barrier in the 100 m as his primary goal for 2019.

On 14 February 2019, Su started the year out strong with a 60 m victory at the 2019 AIT International Grand Prix, clocking a stadium-record time of 6.52 seconds. Two days later, Su quickly followed up his good form with a resounding 60 m victory at the Birmingham meet of the 2019 IAAF World Indoor Tour. The winning time was clocked at 6.47 seconds beating out rivals Reece Prescod and Mike Rodgers to the gold.

At the 2019 IAAF World Relays, Su raced with his teammates Wu Zhiqiang, Xie Zhenye and Liang Jinsheng in the 4 × 100 metres relay. Running the third leg, Su aided his teammates to a second-place finish in the heats, qualifying them for the final with a time of 38.51 seconds. In the final, the Chinese team crossed the line in a season's best 38.16 seconds, subsequently missing out on a bronze medal finish by just 0.01 seconds.

=== 2021 ===
Su Bingtian in 2024, China News Service.

On 1 August 2021, Su clocked a time of 9.827 seconds to win his heat of the 2020 Summer Olympics men's 100 m semi-finals, thereby setting a new Asian record and becoming the second Asian sprinter to have ever qualified for a men's 100 metres Olympic final, after Takayoshi Yoshioka at the 1932 Summer Olympics and the first Asian to qualify for 100 m Olympic Final since the start of the digital timing era. Between 1980 and 2020, Su is the only sprinter of non-African descent to ever make Olympic 100 m Men's Finals in a span of 40 years. In the semi-finals Su was placed ahead of eventual gold-medalist Marcell Jacobs and also achieved the fastest time ever recorded for 60 m-split with 6.29 seconds, also the fastest 60 m all-time under any conditions surpassing both Usain Bolt's prior record of 6.31 seconds for 60 m split in his 100 m world record run and Christian Coleman's 6.34 official indoor world record. Su's 9.83 was also the fastest Olympic semi-final run prior to 2021. However, to this day, Kishane Thompson and Oblique Seville ran faster semi-final Olympic times 9.80 and 9.81 respectively and Su is currently joint third with Noah Lyles at 9.83. Su subsequently went on to achieve a sixth-place finish in the final with 9.98 seconds. He and his teammates also qualified for the final of the men's 4 × 100 m relay and finished fourth in that race in 37.79 seconds, equalling the Chinese national record set in 2019. On 18 February 2022, Great Britain was stripped of its silver medal in the men's 4 × 100 m relay after the Court of Arbitration for Sport confirmed CJ Ujah's doping violation. Su and his teammates were subsequently promoted to a bronze medal position.

=== 2025 ===
In November, Su made his final athletics appearance in the 4 × 100 relay at the National Games, finishing fourth with Guangdong. He later announced his retirement on a social media post, saying his body was telling him to "pass the baton" to younger teammates, ending his 21-year career.

== Personal life ==
=== Education ===
In 2017, Su graduated with a master's degree in International Economics and Trade from the College of Economics at Jinan University. In April 2018, Su was officially appointed as an associate professor of the School of Physical Education at Jinan University.

=== Family ===
Su is a native of Guzhen, Guangdong, China. On 10 October 2017, Su married Lin Yanfang. The wedding ceremony was held in Guzhen, Guangdong, a town close to where Su and Lin grew up. In the early morning of 11 July 2018, their son was born.

=== Outside athletics ===
On 20 December 2017, Su was elected as one of Zhongshan City's representatives for the 13th People's Congress of Guangdong Province.

As the representative for Chinese athletes, Su attended 'The 3rd Olympic Council of Asia (OCA) Athletes' Forum' held in Tokyo, Japan from 24 to 25 November 2018.

=== Charitable activities ===
On 19 September 2015, Su led dozens of school students on Ersha Island to help with fundraising activities for the Chinese charity "Walking for Love". The money raised for "Walking For Love" was intended to be used for the promotion of children's reading skills.

On 10 November 2015, Su visited various Guangzhou Power Supply power grid substations to help conduct on-site measurements. Su also undertook power grid construction work to provide electricity to an elderly man's home. Su's visit came after a typhoon incident in Guangzhou where Guangzhou Power Supply grid workers managed to fix power grids within only 5 hours of going down. After the visit, Su commented that "the existence and construction of the power grid required the collective support of everyone".

== Statistics ==
Information from World Athletics profile unless otherwise noted.

=== Personal bests ===
Event	Time (s)	Wind (m/s)	Competition	Venue	Date	Notes
60 m	6.42	—N/a	World Indoor Championships	Birmingham, United Kingdom	3 March 2018	Asian record
100 m	9.83	+0.9	Olympic Games	Tokyo, Japan	1 August 2021	Asian record
4 × 100 m relay	37.79	—N/a	World Championships	Doha, Qatar	4 October 2019	Chinese record
200 m	21.14	-1.0	World Athletics Continental Tour	La Chaux-de-Fonds, Switzerland	21 August 2019	Personal Best

=== International championship results ===
Representing China and the Asia-Pacific (Continental Cup only)
Year	Competition	Venue	Position	Event	Time	Wind (m/s)	Notes
2009	Asian Indoor Games	Hanoi, Vietnam	1st	60 m	6.65	—N/a	Personal best
2009	Asian Championships	Guangzhou, China	2nd	4 × 100 m relay	39.07	—N/a	Personal best
2009	East Asian Games	Hong Kong, China	1st	100 m	10.33	+0.1	
2009	East Asian Games	Hong Kong, China	3rd	4 × 100 m relay	39.86	—N/a	
2010	Asian Games	Guangzhou, China	1st	4 × 100 m relay	38.78	—N/a	Asian Games record
2011	Asian Championships	Kobe, Japan	1st	100 m	10.21	+1.8	Personal best
2011	Asian Championships	Kobe, Japan	4th	4 × 100 m relay	39.33	—N/a	
2011	Universiade	Shenzhen, China	3rd	100 m	10.27	−0.2	
2011	World Championships	Daegu, South Korea	6th (semi 2)	4 × 100 m relay	38.87	—N/a	Seasonal best
2012	World Indoor Championships	Istanbul, Turkey	1st (semi 3)	60 m	6.74	—N/a	Seasonal best
2012	Olympic Games	London, United Kingdom	8th (semi 3)	100 m	10.28	+1.0	
2012	Olympic Games	London, United Kingdom	5th (semi 1)	4 × 100 m relay	38.38	—N/a	Chinese record
2013	Asian Championships	Pune, India	1st	100 m	10.17	−0.3	
2013	Asian Championships	Pune, India	3rd	4 × 100 m relay	39.17	—N/a	Seasonal best
2013	World Championships	Moscow, Russia	DQ (semi 1)	100 m	—	−0.2	False start
2013	World Championships	Moscow, Russia	5th (semi 2)	4 × 100 m relay	38.95	—N/a	Seasonal best
2013	East Asian Games	Tianjin, China	1st	100 m	10.31	−0.1	
2013	East Asian Games	Tianjin, China	3rd	4 × 100 m relay	39.19	—N/a	
2014	World Indoor Championships	Sopot, Poland	4th	60 m	6.52	—N/a	Chinese record
2014	Asian Games	Incheon, South Korea	2nd	100 m	10.10	+0.4	Seasonal best
2014	Asian Games	Incheon, South Korea	1st	4 × 100 m relay	37.99	—N/a	Asian record
2015	Asian Championships	Wuhan, China	1st	4 × 100 m relay	39.04	—N/a	
2015	World Championships	Beijing, China	9th	100 m	10.06	−0.5	
2015	World Championships	Beijing, China	2nd	4 × 100 m relay	38.01	—N/a	
2016	World Indoor Championships	Portland, Oregon	5th	60 m	6.54	—N/a	
2016	Olympic Games	Rio de Janeiro, Brazil	4th (semi 3)	100 m	10.08	0.0	Seasonal best
2016	Olympic Games	Rio de Janeiro, Brazil	4th	4 × 100 m relay	37.90	—N/a	
2017	World Relays	Nassau, Bahamas	3rd	4 × 100 m relay	39.22	—N/a	
2017	World Championships	London, United Kingdom	8th	100 m	10.27	−0.7	
2017	World Championships	London, United Kingdom	4th	4 × 100 m relay	38.34	—N/a	
2018	World Indoor Championships	Birmingham, United Kingdom	2nd	60 m	6.42	—N/a	Asian record
2018	Asian Games	Jakarta, Indonesia	1st	100 m	9.92	+0.8	Asian Games record
2018	Asian Games	Jakarta, Indonesia	3rd	4 × 100 m relay	38.89	—N/a	
2018	Continental Cup	Ostrava, Czech Republic	2nd	100 m	10.03	0.0	
2019	World Relays	Yokohama, Japan	4th	4 × 100 m relay	38.16	—N/a	Seasonal best
2019	World Championships	Doha, Qatar	21st	100 m	10.23	–0.3	
2019	World Championships	Doha, Qatar	6th	4 × 100 m relay	38.07	—N/a	
2021	Olympic Games	Tokyo, Japan	6th	100 m	9.98	+0.1	
2021	Olympic Games	Tokyo, Japan	3rd	4 × 100 m relay	37.79	—N/a	= Chinese record
2022	World Championships	Eugene, United States	23rd (sf)	100 m	10.30	+0.1	
2022	World Championships	Eugene, United States	12th (h)	4 × 100 m relay	38.83	—N/a	

=== Circuit wins ===
Outdoor

- Diamond League (Event in parentheses)
  - Shanghai: 2016 (100 m), 2017 (4 × 100 m relay)
  - Monaco: 2017 (4 × 100 m relay)

Indoor

- World Indoor Tour (60 m)
  - Overall winner: 2018
  - Karlsruhe: 2018
  - Düsseldorf: 2018, 2019
  - Glasgow: 2018
  - Birmingham: 2019

=== National championship results ===
Year	Competition	Venue	Position	Event	Time	Wind (m/s)	Notes
2007	Chinese Junior Championships	Zhengzhou	4th (semi 2)	100 m	10.74	0.0	Seasonal best
2007	Chinese World Trials	Suzhou	3rd (heat 6)	100 m	10.83	+1.6	
2007	Chinese City Games	Wuhan	5th	100 m	10.58	+0.1	
2008	Chinese Championships	Shijiazhuang	4th	100 m	10.41	+0.2	Personal best
2008	Chinese Youth Championships	Taian	1st	100 m	10.53	+0.2	
2009	Chinese Championships	Yulin	1st	100 m	10.28	−0.4	Personal best
2009	Chinese Games	Jinan	6th	100 m	10.52	−0.4	
2010	Chinese Championships	Jinan	5th	100 m	10.39	0.0	
2011	Chinese Indoor Championships	Chengdu	1st	60 m	6.59	—N/a	
2011	Chinese Championships	Hefei	1st	100 m	10.16	+0.7	Chinese record
2012	Chinese Championships	Kunshan	1st	100 m	10.21	+1.4	
2013	Chinese Games	Shenyang	2nd	100 m	10.12	+1.1	Personal best
2013	Chinese Games	Shenyang	1st	4 × 100 m relay	38.73	—N/a	Seasonal best
2014	Chinese University Championships	Beijing	1st	100 m	10.28	−0.6	
2014	Chinese Championships	Suzhou	2nd	100 m	10.45	+0.4	
2017	Chinese Games	Tianjin	2nd	100 m	10.10	+0.3	
2017	Chinese Games	Tianjin	1st	4 × 100 m relay	38.16	—N/a	Seasonal best
2019	Chinese World Trials	Shenyang	2nd	100 m	10.19	+0.1	
2021	Chinese Games	Xi'an	1st	100 m	9.95	+0.1	

=== Sub-10 seconds 100 metres record ===
Su Bingtian has broken the 10-second barrier in the 100 metres on 13 occasions, with 10 of those occasions being under the allowable wind velocity of +2.0 m/s for record purposes. His first sub-10 clocking was on 30 May 2015 at the Prefontaine Classic in 9.99 seconds with a legal +1.5 m/s wind reading, setting a Chinese record and making him the first athlete of East Asian descent to break the 10-second barrier. He improved his personal best and the Chinese record on 22 June 2018 at the Meeting Madrid to 9.91 seconds, equaling the Asian record set by Nigerian-born Qatari sprinter Femi Ogunode, and further improved all three of these records on 1 August 2021 by clocking 9.83 seconds to win his semifinal heat at the 2020 Summer Olympics in Tokyo.

Time (s)	Wind (m/s)	Competition	Venue	Date	Notes
9.99	+1.5	Prefontaine Classic	Eugene, Oregon, U.S.	30 May 2015	Chinese record
9.99(9.987)	−0.4	World Championships	Beijing, China	23 August 2015	Chinese record
9.98 w	+4.1	Pure Athletics Spring Invitational	Clermont, Florida, U.S.	15 April 2017	Wind-assisted
9.92 w	+2.4	Prefontaine Classic	Eugene, Oregon, U.S.	27 May 2017	Wind-assisted
9.90 w	+2.4	Prefontaine Classic	Eugene, Oregon, U.S.	26 May 2018	Wind-assisted
9.91	+0.2	Meeting Madrid	Madrid, Spain	22 June 2018	Asian record
9.91(9.904)	+0.8	Meeting de Paris	Paris, France	30 June 2018	Asian record
9.92	+0.8	Asian Games	Jakarta, Indonesia	26 August 2018	Asian Games record
9.98	–0.9	Zhaoqing Invitational	Zhaoqing, China	24 April 2021	
9.98	+0.8	Chinese Championships	Shangyu, China	12 June 2021	
9.83(9.827)	+0.9	Summer Olympics	Tokyo, Japan	1 August 2021	Asian record
9.98	+0.1	Summer Olympics	Tokyo, Japan	1 August 2021	
9.95	+0.1	Chinese Games	Xi'an, China	21 September 2021	

=== Seasonal bests ===
Year	60 metres	100 metres
2006	—	10.59
2007	6.89	10.45
2008	6.71	10.41
2009	6.66	10.28
2010	6.58	10.32
2011	6.56	10.16
2012	6.74	10.19
2013	6.55	10.06
2014	6.52	10.10
2015	6.61	9.99
2016	6.50	10.08
2017	—	10.03
2018	6.42	9.91
2019	6.47	10.05
2020	—	—
2021	6.49	9.83

=== Track records ===
As of 9 September 2024, Bingtian holds the following track records for 100 metres.

Location	Time	Windspeed m/s	Date
Jakarta	9.92	+0.8	26/08/2018
Shaoxing	9.98	+0.8	11/06/2021
Shenzhen	10.05	+0.6	20/03/2021
Xi'an	9.95	+0.1	21/09/2021
Zhaoqing	9.98	–0.9	24/04/2021

Records
Preceded by Tosin Ogunode	Men's 60 m Asian record holder 18 March 2016 – present	Succeeded by Incumbent
Preceded by Femi Ogunode	Men's 100 m Asian record holder 22 June 2018 – present	Succeeded by Incumbent
Olympic Games
Preceded by Ding Ning	Flagbearer for China at the Olympics closing ceremony Tokyo 2020	Succeeded by Li Fabin & Ou Zixia
