= Sota Kawatsura =

Japanese sprinter (born 1989)

Personal information
- Nationality: Japanese
- Born: 19 June 1989 (age 37) Tokyo, Japan
- Education: Chuo University
- Height: 1.72 m (5 ft 8 in)
- Weight: 58 kg (128 lb)

Sport
- Country: Japan
- Sport: Track and field
- Event(s): 100 metres 200 metres

Achievements and titles
- Personal best(s): 60 m: 6.63 (2014) 100 m: 10.22 (2011) 200 m: 20.56 (2011)
Medal record
Men's athletics
Representing Japan
Asian Championships
Gold medal – first place	2011 Kobe	4×100 m relay
Silver medal – second place	2013 Pune	4×100 m relay
Bronze medal – third place	2011 Kobe	100 m
East Asian Games
Bronze medal – third place	2009 Hong Kong	200 m

Sota Kawatsura (川面 聡大, Kawatsura Sōta; born 19 June 1989 in Tokyo) is a Japanese track and field sprinter. He was an unused reserve runner in the 4 × 100 metres relay at the 2011 World Championships. He has won several medals at regional level.

His personal best is 10.22 seconds in the 100 metres and 20.56 seconds in the 200 metres. He is also the former national best holder for the outdoor 60 metres at 6.63 seconds.

== Personal bests ==
Event	Time (s)	Competition	Venue	Date	Notes
60 m	6.63 (wind: 0.0 m/s)	National Record Trials	Itami, Japan	5 October 2014	Former NB
100 m	10.22 (wind: +1.8 m/s)	National Sports Festival	Yamaguchi, Japan	8 October 2011	
100 m	10.10 (wind: +3.4 m/s)	Texas Relays	Austin, United States	29 March 2014	Wind-assisted
200 m	20.56 (wind: 0.0 m/s)	Kanto University Championships	Tokyo, Japan	22 May 2011	

== International competition ==
Year	Competition	Venue	Position	Event	Time (s)	Notes
Representing Japan
2009	East Asian Games	Hong Kong, China	3rd	200 m	21.43 (wind: -1.3 m/s)	
2011	Asian Championships	Kobe, Japan	3rd	100 m	10.30 (wind: +1.8 m/s)	PB
2011	Asian Championships	Kobe, Japan	1st	4×100 m relay	39.18 (relay leg: 1st)	
2011	Universiade	Shenzhen, China	12th (sf)	100 m	10.43 (wind: 0.0 m/s)	
2011	Universiade	Shenzhen, China	— (h)	4×100 m relay	DQ (relay leg: 3rd)	
2013	Asian Championships	Pune, India	— (sf)	100 m	DQ	
2013	Asian Championships	Pune, India	2nd	4×100 m relay	39.11 (relay leg: 4th)	

== National titles ==
Year	Competition	Venue	Event	Time
Representing Chuo University
2011	National University Championships	Kumamoto, Kumamoto	4×100 m relay	38.85 (relay leg: 2nd)
Representing Mizuno and Tokyo (National Sports Festival only)
2012	National Corporate Championships	Fukuoka, Fukuoka	4×100 m relay	39.83 (relay leg: 1st)
2013	National Corporate Championships	Kumagaya, Saitama	100 m	10.24 (wind: +1.3 m/s)
2013	National Sports Festival	Chōfu, Tokyo	100 m	10.41 (wind: -1.7 m/s)
2014	National Sports Festival	Isahaya, Nagasaki	4×100 m relay	39.36 (relay leg: 1st)
2016	National Corporate Championships	Osaka, Osaka	4×100 m relay	39.37 (relay leg: 1st)
2017	National Corporate Championships	Osaka, Osaka	4×400 m relay	3:08.82 (relay leg: 3rd)
