= Lai Chun Ho =

Hong Kong sprinter (born 1989)

Personal information
- Born: February 5, 1989 (age 37)
- Height: 1.71 m (5 ft 7 1/2 in)
- Weight: 64 kg (141 lb)

Sport
- Country: Hong Kong
- Sport: Athletics
- Event: 4 × 100m relay
Medal record
Men's Athletics
Representing Hong Kong
Asian Junior Athletics Championships
Gold medal – first place	2008 Jakarta	100m sprint
Bronze medal – third place	2008 Jakarta	4 × 100 metres relay
Asian Athletics Championships
Gold medal – first place	2013 Puna	4 × 100 metres relay
Silver medal – second place	2011 Kobe	4 × 100 metres relay
Universiade
Bronze medal – third place	2011 Shenzhen	4 × 100 metres relay
Asian Indoor Athletics Championships
Silver medal – second place	2012 Hangzhou	60m sprint
East Asian Games
Silver medal – second place	2013 Tianjin	4 × 100 metres relay
Asian Games
Bronze medal – third place	2014 Incheon	4 × 100 metres relay

Lai Chun Ho (Chinese: 黎振浩; Jyutping: lai^{4} zan^{3} hou^{4}; born February 5, 1989, in Hong Kong) is a track and field sprint athlete who competes internationally for Hong Kong.

In July 2008, Lai Chun Ho snatched gold in the 2008 Asian Junior Athletics Championships in Jakarta with a time of 10.46 seconds. He then teamed up with Tsui Chi Ho, Tong Hang and Chan Kei Fung to take bronze in the 4 × 100 m relay for Hong Kong.

Lai represented Hong Kong at the 2008 Summer Olympics in Beijing. He competed at the 100 metres sprint and placed 7th in his heat without advancing to the second round. He ran the distance in a time of 10.63 seconds.

Lai Chun-ho is a member of the sprint team that also includes Yip Siu-keung, Leung Ki-ho and Lawrence Ho who won bronze in the men's 4 × 100 m relay at the 2011 Summer Universiade in Shenzhen.

At the 2012 Asian Indoor Athletics Championships held in Hangzhou in February, Lai Chun Ho took the silver medal in the men's 60 metres sprint event with 6.78 seconds.

Lai is also a member of the team that ran in the Men's 4 × 100 metres relay race in the 2012 Summer Olympics in London. The team recorded 38.61 seconds in heat 2 and failed to make it to the final.
