= Dmitriy Marshin =

Azerbaijani hammer thrower

Personal information
- Born: September 15, 1972 (age 53)
- Height: 1.86 m (6 ft 1 in)
- Weight: 115 kg (254 lb)

Sport
- Country: Azerbaijan
- Sport: Athletics
- Event: Hammer throw
Medal record
Men's athletics
Representing Azerbaijan
Islamic Solidarity Games
| Bronze medal – third place | 2013 Palembang | Hammer throw |

Dmitry Marshin (born as Dzmitri Marshyn, 15 September 1972 in Mogilev) is an Azerbaijani athlete of Belarusian descent.

== Career ==
He competed for Azerbaijan in hammer throw at the 2012 Summer Olympics, finishing in 20th in the qualifying round and not qualifying for the final. His personal best is a throw of 79.56 in 2012.

=== Suspension ===
In 2015 Marshin was suspended for four years after he failed a drug test.
