= Buthaina Al-Yaqoubi =

Omani sprinter

Buthaina Eid Al-Yaqoubi (born January 31, 1991) is a track and field sprint athlete who competes internationally for Oman. She was the first woman to represent Oman at the Olympics.

Al-Yaqoubi represented Oman at the 2008 Summer Olympics in Beijing. She competed at the 100 metres sprint and placed 9th in her heat without advancing to the second round. She ran the distance in a time of 13.90 seconds.
