= Ng Ka Fung =

Hong Kong sprinter (born 1992)

Personal information
- Born: October 27, 1992 (age 33)
- Height: 1.8 m (5 ft 11 in)
- Weight: 77 kg (170 lb)

Sport
- Country: Hong Kong
- Sport: Athletics
- Event: 4 × 100m relay
Medal record
Asian Athletics Championships
Gold medal – first place	2013 Puna	4 × 100 metres relay
Silver medal – second place	2011 Kobe	4 × 100 metres relay
East Asian Games
Silver medal – second place	2013 Tianjin	4 × 100 metres relay
Asian Games
Bronze medal – third place	2014 Incheon	4 × 100 metres relay

Ng Ka Fung (Chinese: 吳家鋒; Jyutping: ng^{4} gaa^{1} fung^{1}; born 27 October 1992) is a Hong Kong sprinter. He competed in the 4 × 100 m relay event at the 2012 Summer Olympics.
