= Barakat Al-Harthi =

Omani sprinter (born 1988)

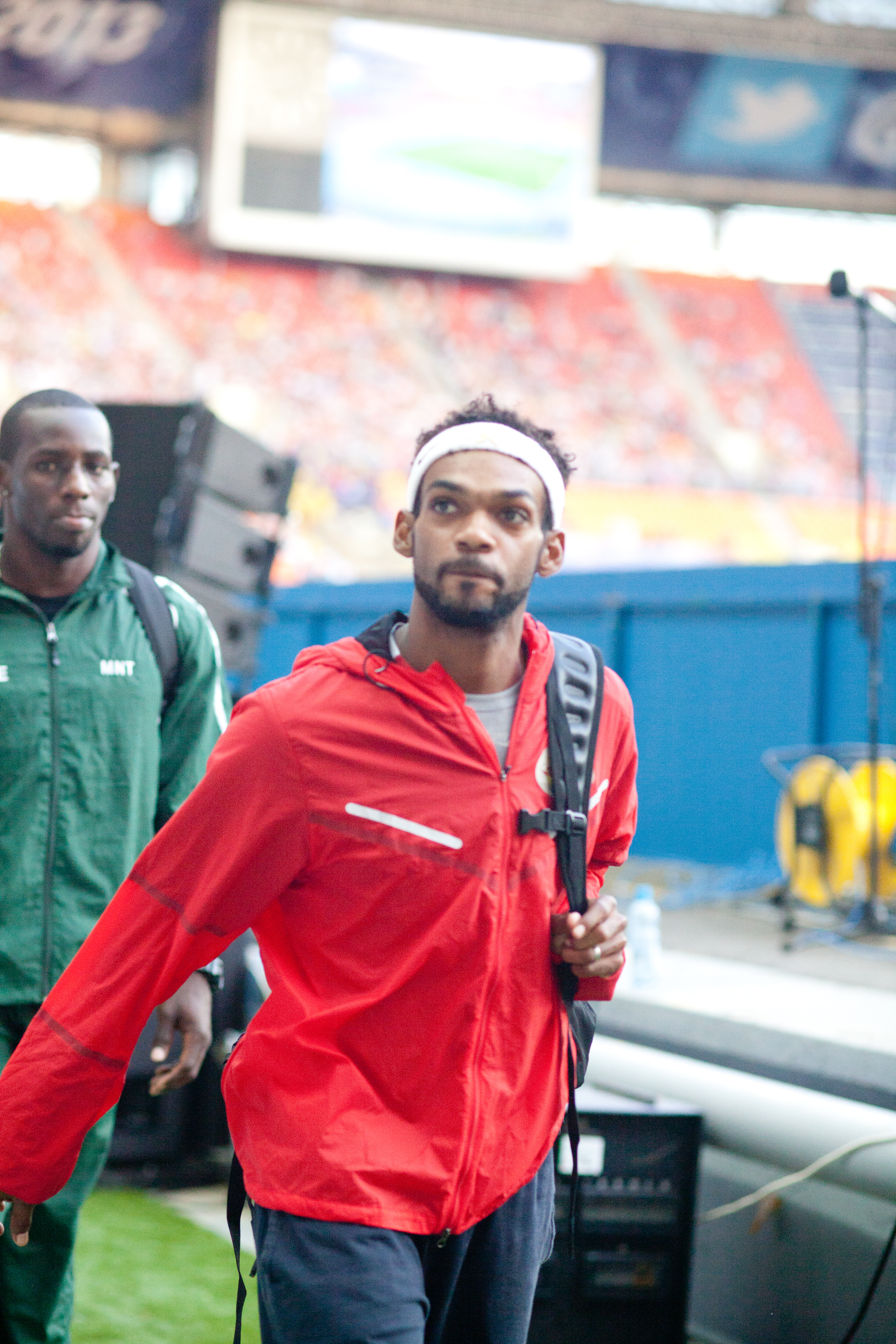
- Al-Harthi at the 2013 World Championships

Personal information
- Born: 15 June 1988 (age 38) Ibra, Oman
- Height: 1.71 m (5 ft 7 in)
- Weight: 67 kg (148 lb)

Sport
- Country: Oman
- Sport: Athletics
- Event: 100 metres

Achievements and titles
- Personal best: 100 m : 9.97
Medal record
Men's athletics
Representing Oman
Asian Games
Bronze medal – third place	2010 Guangzhou	100 m
Asian Championships
Bronze medal – third place	2013 Pune	100 m
Bronze medal – third place	2019 Doha	4x100 m relay
Asian Indoor Championships
Bronze medal – third place	2010 Tehran	60 m
Military World Games
Gold medal – first place	2015 Mungyeong	100 m
Silver medal – second place	2019 Wuhan	4x100 m relay
Islamic Solidarity Games
Gold medal – first place	2013 Palembang	4x100 m relay
Silver medal – second place	2013 Palembang	100 m
Bronze medal – third place	2017 Baku	100 m
Bronze medal – third place	2021 Konya	100 m
Bronze medal – third place	2021 Konya	4x100 m relay
Pan Arab Games
Gold medal – first place	2023 Algeria	4x100 m relay
Silver medal – second place	2011 Doha	100 m
Silver medal – second place	2011 Doha	4x100 m relay
Bronze medal – third place	2023 Algeria	100 m
Arab Championships
Gold medal – first place	2011 Al Ain	4x100 m relay
Gold medal – first place	2013 Doha	4x100 m relay
Silver medal – second place	2011 Al Ain	100 m
Silver medal – second place	2015 Isa Town	100 m
Silver medal – second place	2015 Isa Town	200 m
Bronze medal – third place	2009 Damascus	100 m
Bronze medal – third place	2009 Damascus	4x100 m relay
Bronze medal – third place	2013 Doha	100 m
Bronze medal – third place	2021 Radès	100 m
GCC Games
Silver medal – second place	2022 Kuwait City	4x100 m relay
Bronze medal – third place	2022 Kuwait City	100 m
West Asian Championships
Gold medal – first place	2012 Dubai	100 m
Gold medal – first place	2018 Amman	100 m
Gold medal – first place	2023 Doha	4x100 m relay
Silver medal – second place	2010 Aleppo	100 m
Silver medal – second place	2012 Dubai	200 m
Silver medal – second place	2012 Dubai	4x100 m relay
Asian Beach Games
Gold medal – first place	2016 Da Nang	60 m
Silver medal – second place	2016 Da Nang	4 x 60 m relay
- Updated on 12 August 2025

Barakat Mubarak Al-Harthi (Arabic: بركات مبارك الحارثي; born 15 June 1988) is an Omani sprinter who specializes in the 100 metres.

== Biography ==
He was born in Ibra. He competed at the 2009, 2013 and 2015 World Championships and the 2010 and 2014 World Indoor Championships without reaching the final.

Al-Harthi won a bronze medal at the Asian Games in Guangzhou, China in the 100m, which was Oman's only medal in the Games.

His personal best times are 6.67 seconds in the 60 metres, achieved at the 2010 World Indoor Championships in Doha; 9.97 seconds in the 100 metres, achieved in June 2016 in Stara Zagora; and 20.77 seconds in the 200 metres, achieved 2011 in Manama.

He ran at the 2011 Pan Arab Games but his sample came back positive for banned substances and he was banned for six months. After his ban, Al-Harthi competed at the 2012 Summer Olympics in the 100 metres.

Al-Harthi qualified for the 2016 Summer Olympics with a time of 10.16 seconds at the 2015 Military World Games. In 2016, his Olympic qualifying time of 10.05 seconds was 0.11 seconds faster than the required time to enter the men's 100 metres. While flying to Rio to compete at the 2016 Summer Olympics, Al-Harthi missed his layover and lost some of his sports equipment. On 13 August, Al-Harthi did not appear in the preliminary round and competed in the sixth race of the heats. Al-Harthi finished in third in his heat with a time of 10.22 seconds. His placing meant Al-Harthi did not qualify as one of the first two runners in his individual heat, and as he also did not have one of the eight fastest times from the remaining runners, Al-Harthi did not progress to the semi-finals. Out of 84 competitors, Al-Harthi finished in a tie for 26th place overall.
