= Tsui Chi Ho =

Hong Kong sprinter

Personal information
- Born: February 17, 1990 (age 36) Hong Kong
- Height: 1.71 m (5 ft 7 1/2 in)
- Weight: 62 kg (137 lb)

Sport
- Country: Hong Kong
- Sport: Athletics
- Event: 4 × 100m relay
Medal record
Men's Athletics
Representing Hong Kong
Asian Athletics Championships
Gold medal – first place	2013 Pune	4 × 100 m relay
Silver medal – second place	2011 Kobe	4 × 100 m relay
East Asian Games
Silver medal – second place	2013 Tianjin	4 × 100 m relay
Asian Games
Bronze medal – third place	2014 Incheon	4 × 100 m relay
Asian Junior Athletics Championships
Bronze medal – third place	2008 Jakarta	100 m
Bronze medal – third place	2008 Jakarta	4 × 100 m relay

Tsui Chi Ho (Chinese: 徐志豪; Jyutping: ceoi^{4} zi^{3} hou^{4}; born 17 February 1990) is a Hong Kong sprinter. He competed in the 4 × 100 m relay event at the 2012 Summer Olympics.

Tsui Chi Ho competed in the 2008 Asian Junior Athletics Championships in Jakarta, winning bronze in both the 100m sprint and 4 × 100 m relay.

Tsui Chi Ho is a member of the Hong Kong sprint team that won gold at men's 4 × 100 metres relay at the 2013 Asian Athletics Championships in Pune, India in July 2013. Hong Kong's quartet of Tang Yik Chun, Lai Chun Ho, Ng Ka Fung and Tsui Chi Ho won the relay in 38.94 seconds, ahead of second-placed Japan (39.11 secs) and China (39.17 secs).

In October 2013, Tsui Chi Ho won the Hong Kong Athletics League by winning the 100m final with a time of 10.66 seconds.

In October 2014, at the 2014 Asian Games, Tsui Chi Ho anchored the sprint team that set a seasonal best of 38.98 seconds to capture the bronze medal, behind China and Japan. This is Hong Kong's first Asian Games bronze medal in track and field since the 1954 Asian Games in Manila, when Stephen Xavier came third in the men's 200 metres.
