= Abdullah Al-Sooli =

Omani sprinter (born 1988)

Medal record

Men's athletics

Representing Oman

Pan Arab Games
Bronze medal – third place	2011 Doha	200 m

Abdullah Al-Sooli (born 20 January 1988) is an Omani sprinter who specializes in the 100 metres. He was born in Al-Rustaq.

== Career ==
He competed at the 2006 World Junior Championships and the 2008 Olympic Games without progressing to the second round. His personal best time is 10.53 seconds, achieved in the 2008 Olympic heat in Beijing.
