= Athletics at the 2010 Asian Games – Men's 100 metres =

Men's 100 metres at the 2010 Asian Games
- Venue: Aoti Main Stadium
- Dates: 21–22 November 2010
- Competitors: 34 from 22 nations

Medalists
gold medal	Lao Yi	China
silver medal	Yasir Al-Nashiri	Saudi Arabia
bronze medal	Barakat Al-Harthi	Oman

The men's 100 metres event at the 2010 Asian Games was held at the Aoti Main Stadium, Guangzhou, China on 21–22 November.

== Schedule ==
All times are China Standard Time (UTC+08:00)

Date	Time	Event
Sunday, 21 November 2010	17:25	Round 1
Monday, 22 November 2010	17:25	Semifinals
Monday, 22 November 2010	19:30	Final

== Records ==
Prior to this competition, the existing world, Asian and Games records were as follows.

World Record	Usain Bolt (JAM)	9.58	Berlin, Germany	16 August 2009
Asian Record	Samuel Francis (QAT)	9.99	Amman, Jordan	26 July 2007
Games Record	Koji Ito (JPN)	10.00	Bangkok, Thailand	13 December 1998

== Results ==
Legend

- DNS — Did not start
- DSQ — Disqualified

=== Round 1 ===
- Qualification: First 4 in each heat (Q) and the next 4 fastest (q) advance to the semifinals.

==== Heat 1 ====
- Wind: +1.2 m/s

Rank	Athlete	Time	Notes
1	Lim Hee-nam (KOR)	10.64	Q
2	Elfi Mustapa (SIN)	10.69	Q
3	Fahad Al-Jabri (OMA)	10.79	Q
4	Azharul Islam (BAN)	11.19	Q
5	Sar Churpveasna (CAM)	11.19	
6	Pao Hin Fong (MAC)	11.20	
—	Naoki Tsukahara (JPN)	DNS	

==== Heat 2 ====
- Wind: 0.0 m/s

Rank	Athlete	Time	Notes
1	Suryo Agung Wibowo (INA)	10.42	Q
2	Masashi Eriguchi (JPN)	10.57	Q
3	Wachara Sondee (THA)	10.58	Q
4	Wang Wen-tang (TPE)	10.58	Q
5	Azneem Ahmed (MDV)	10.99	
6	Waleed Anwari (AFG)	11.32	
—	Eisa Al-Youhah (IOC)	DSQ	

==== Heat 3 ====
- Wind: −0.1 m/s

Rank	Athlete	Time	Notes
1	Zheng Dongsheng (CHN)	10.41	Q
2	Samuel Francis (QAT)	10.42	Q
3	Yasir Al-Nashiri (KSA)	10.46	Q
4	Abdul Najeeb Qureshi (IND)	10.50	Q
5	Amirudin Jamal (SIN)	10.67	q
6	Mohamed Al-Rashedi (BRN)	10.79	
7	Tilak Ram Tharu (NEP)	11.14	

==== Heat 4 ====
- Wind: +0.3 m/s

Rank	Athlete	Time	Notes
1	Lao Yi (CHN)	10.34	Q
2	Yahya Habeeb (KSA)	10.43	Q
3	Tsui Chi Ho (HKG)	10.43	Q
4	Jirapong Meenapra (THA)	10.51	Q
5	Franklin Ramses Burumi (INA)	10.63	q
6	Krishna Kumar Rane (IND)	10.64	q
—	Mohamed Farhan (BRN)	DSQ	

==== Heat 5 ====
- Wind: +0.8 m/s

Rank	Athlete	Time	Notes
1	Barakat Al-Harthi (OMA)	10.26	Q
2	Lai Chun Ho (HKG)	10.43	Q
3	Yi Wei-chen (TPE)	10.52	Q
4	Kim Kuk-young (KOR)	10.58	Q
5	Ahmed Juma Al-Zaabi (UAE)	10.75	q
6	Aymen Jasim (IRQ)	10.83	

=== Semifinals ===
- Qualification: First 2 in each heat (Q) and the next 2 fastest (q) advance to the final.

==== Heat 1 ====
- Wind: +1.7 m/s

Rank	Athlete	Time	Notes
1	Lao Yi (CHN)	10.28	Q
2	Tsui Chi Ho (HKG)	10.32	Q
3	Yahya Habeeb (KSA)	10.40	q
4	Wachara Sondee (THA)	10.46	
5	Lim Hee-nam (KOR)	10.46	
6	Franklin Ramses Burumi (INA)	10.55	
7	Azharul Islam (BAN)	11.14	
—	Wang Wen-tang (TPE)	DSQ	

==== Heat 2 ====
- Wind: +0.9 m/s

Rank	Athlete	Time	Notes
1	Suryo Agung Wibowo (INA)	10.40	Q
2	Zheng Dongsheng (CHN)	10.44	Q
3	Masashi Eriguchi (JPN)	10.56	
4	Krishna Kumar Rane (IND)	10.62	
5	Yi Wei-chen (TPE)	10.63	
6	Ahmed Juma Al-Zaabi (UAE)	10.73	
7	Fahad Al-Jabri (OMA)	10.88	
8	Elfi Mustapa (SIN)	10.95	

==== Heat 3 ====
- Wind: +0.7 m/s

Rank	Athlete	Time	Notes
1	Barakat Al-Harthi (OMA)	10.35	Q
2	Yasir Al-Nashiri (KSA)	10.38	Q
3	Lai Chun Ho (HKG)	10.42	q
4	Abdul Najeeb Qureshi (IND)	10.46	
5	Kim Kuk-young (KOR)	10.51	
6	Jirapong Meenapra (THA)	10.52	
7	Amirudin Jamal (SIN)	10.73	
—	Samuel Francis (QAT)	DSQ	

=== Final ===
- Wind: +1.7 m/s

Rank	Athlete	Time	Notes
1st place, gold medalist(s)	Lao Yi (CHN)	10.24	
2nd place, silver medalist(s)	Yasir Al-Nashiri (KSA)	10.26	
3rd place, bronze medalist(s)	Barakat Al-Harthi (OMA)	10.28	
4	Lai Chun Ho (HKG)	10.32	
5	Yahya Habeeb (KSA)	10.35	
6	Suryo Agung Wibowo (INA)	10.37	
7	Zheng Dongsheng (CHN)	10.38	
8	Tsui Chi Ho (HKG)	12.26	
