= Athletics at the 2006 Asian Games – Men's 100 metres =

Men's 100 metres at the 2006 Asian Games
- Venue: Khalifa International Stadium
- Dates: 8–9 December 2006
- Competitors: 27 from 19 nations

Medalists
gold medal	Yahya Habeeb	Saudi Arabia
silver medal	Naoki Tsukahara	Japan
bronze medal	Wachara Sondee	Thailand

The men's 100 metres competition at the 2006 Asian Games in Doha, Qatar was held on 8 and 9 December 2006 at the Khalifa International Stadium.

== Schedule ==
All times are Arabia Standard Time (UTC+03:00)

Date	Time	Event
Friday, 8 December 2006	17:40	1st round
Saturday, 9 December 2006	09:20	Semifinals
Saturday, 9 December 2006	18:30	Final

== Records ==
Prior to this competition, the existing world, Asian and Games records were as follows.

World Record	Asafa Powell (JAM); ~~Justin Gatlin (USA)~~; Asafa Powell (JAM); Asafa Powell (JAM)	9.77	Athens, Greece; ~~Doha, Qatar~~; Gateshead, United Kingdom; Zurich, Switzerland	14 June 2005; ~~12 May 2006~~; 12 May 2006; 11 June 2006
Asian Record	Koji Ito (JPN)	10.00	Bangkok, Thailand	13 December 1998
Games Record	Koji Ito (JPN)	10.00	Bangkok, Thailand	13 December 1998

- Justin Gatlin's world record was rescinded in 2007.

== Results ==
Legend

- DNF — Did not finish

=== 1st round ===
- Qualification: First 3 in each heat (Q) and the next 4 fastest (q) advance to the semifinals.

==== Heat 1 ====
- Wind: +1.0 m/s

Rank	Athlete	Time	Notes
1	Yahya Al-Ghahes (KSA)	10.42	Q
2	Wachara Sondee (THA)	10.42	Q
3	Naoki Tsukahara (JPN)	10.47	Q
4	Lim Hee-nam (KOR)	10.62	q
5	Khalid Al-Obaidli (QAT)	10.65	q
6	Aleksandr Zolotukhin (KGZ)	11.16	
7	Masoud Azizi (AFG)	11.40	

==== Heat 2 ====
- Wind: +0.3 m/s

Rank	Athlete	Time	Notes
1	Al-Waleed Abdulla (QAT)	10.46	Q
2	Vyacheslav Muravyev (KAZ)	10.53	Q
3	Hu Kai (CHN)	10.64	Q
4	Yousuf Darwish (OMA)	10.83	
5	Jeon Duk-hyung (KOR)	10.87	
6	Chhay Lun (CAM)	11.42	
7	Zahir Naseer (MDV)	11.80	

==== Heat 3 ====
- Wind: +0.5 m/s

Rank	Athlete	Time	Notes
1	Yahya Habeeb (KSA)	10.49	Q
2	Mohamed Al-Rashedi (BRN)	10.54	Q
3	Liu Yuan-kai (TPE)	10.68	Q
4	Umanga Surendra (SRI)	10.80	
5	Juma Al-Jabri (OMA)	10.81	
6	Leung Chun Wai (HKG)	10.82	
7	Ali Shareef (MDV)	11.97	

==== Heat 4 ====
- Wind: −0.1 m/s

Rank	Athlete	Time	Notes
1	Shigeyuki Kojima (JPN)	10.49	Q
2	Sompote Suwannarangsri (THA)	10.49	Q
3	Khalil Al-Hanahneh (JOR)	10.66	Q
4	Wen Yongyi (CHN)	10.68	q
5	Chiang Wai Hung (HKG)	10.72	q
—	Hareth Mohammed (IRQ)	DNF	

=== Semifinals ===
- Qualification: First 4 in each heat (Q) advance to the final.

==== Heat 1 ====
- Wind: +0.8 m/s

Rank	Athlete	Time	Notes
1	Al-Waleed Abdulla (QAT)	10.37	Q
2	Naoki Tsukahara (JPN)	10.42	Q
3	Yahya Habeeb (KSA)	10.45	Q
4	Vyacheslav Muravyev (KAZ)	10.46	Q
5	Sompote Suwannarangsri (THA)	10.52	
6	Liu Yuan-kai (TPE)	10.57	
7	Khalil Al-Hanahneh (JOR)	10.71	
8	Hu Kai (CHN)	10.75	

==== Heat 2 ====
- Wind: +0.4 m/s

Rank	Athlete	Time	Notes
1	Wachara Sondee (THA)	10.46	Q
2	Shigeyuki Kojima (JPN)	10.46	Q
3	Wen Yongyi (CHN)	10.53	Q
4	Yahya Al-Ghahes (KSA)	10.55	Q
5	Lim Hee-nam (KOR)	10.63	
6	Khalid Al-Obaidli (QAT)	10.68	
7	Chiang Wai Hung (HKG)	10.88	
8	Mohamed Al-Rashedi (BRN)	11.44	

=== Final ===
- Wind: +0.3 m/s

Rank	Athlete	Time	Notes
1st place, gold medalist(s)	Yahya Habeeb (KSA)	10.32	
2nd place, silver medalist(s)	Naoki Tsukahara (JPN)	10.34	
3rd place, bronze medalist(s)	Wachara Sondee (THA)	10.39	
4	Al-Waleed Abdulla (QAT)	10.48	
5	Yahya Al-Ghahes (KSA)	10.52	
6	Shigeyuki Kojima (JPN)	10.57	
7	Wen Yongyi (CHN)	10.59	
8	Vyacheslav Muravyev (KAZ)	10.63	
