= Athletics at the 2009 National Games of China =

Athletics at the 11th National Games of China
- Dates: 21–26 October
- Host city: Jinan, PR China
- Venue: Jinan Olympic Sports Center
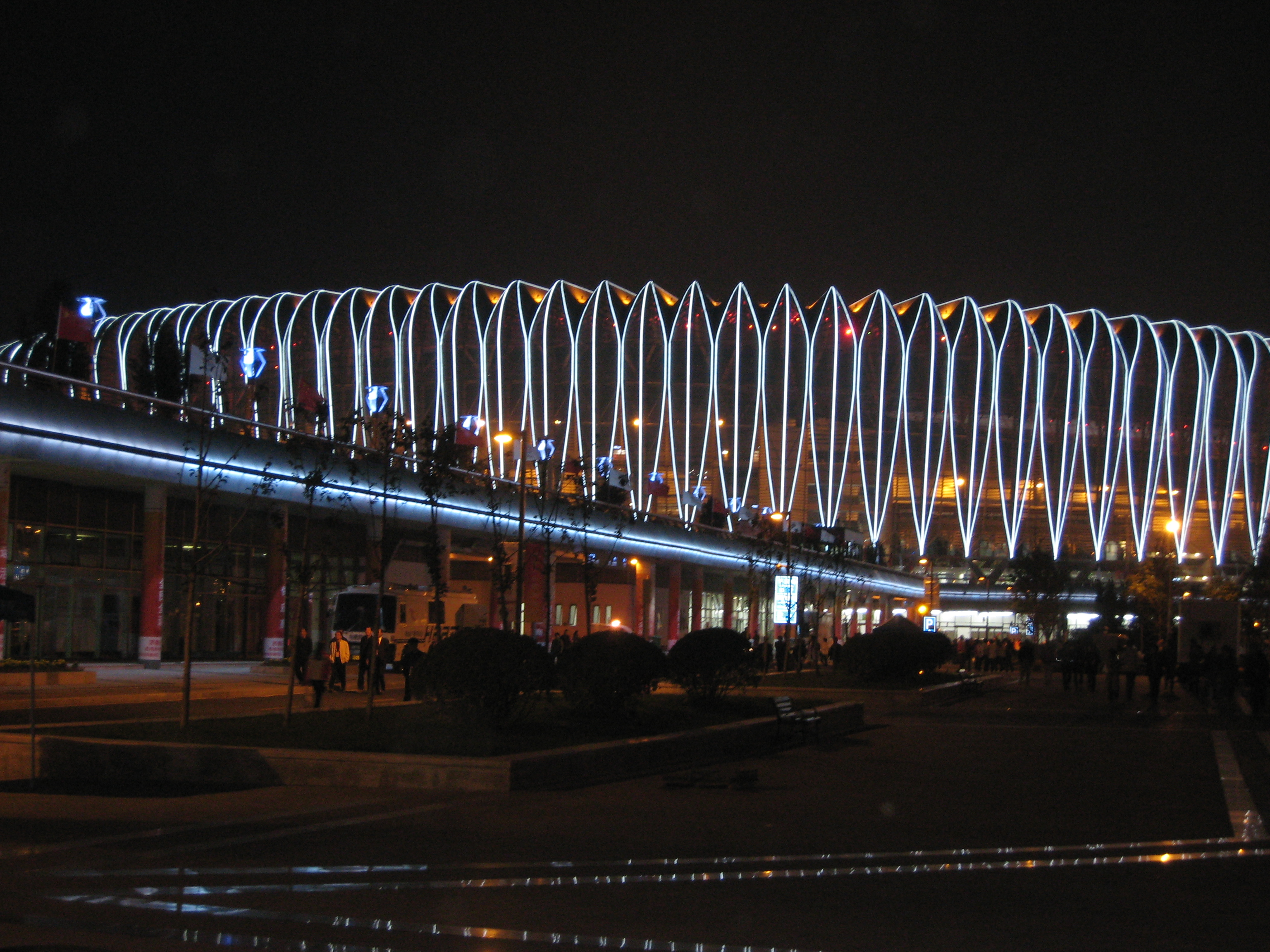
- Level: Senior
- Events: 46
- Records set: ?

At the 2009 National Games of China, the athletics events were held at the Jinan Olympic Sports Center in Jinan, People's Republic of China from 21–26 October, 2009. The National Games marathon event was held in conjunction with the Beijing Marathon on 18 October.

== Medal summary ==
=== Men ===
Event	Gold		Silver		Bronze	
100 metres	Lu Bin; Jiangsu	10.25 PB	Zhang Peimeng; Beijing	10.31	Guo Fan; Fujian	10.41
200 metres	Li Mingxuan; Heilongjiang	20.79 PB	Huang Wei; Shanghai	20.98	Huang Xiang; Sichuan	20.99 PB/NYR
400 metres	Liu Xiaosheng; Guangdong	46.02	Wang Youxin; Guangdong	46.84	Chen Xiaochuan; Fujian	46.90
800 metres	Li Xiangyu; Shanxi	1:49.19	Wang Ningming; Fujian	1:49.53 PB	Xia Xiudong; Zhejiang	1:50.39
1500 metres	Sun Wenli; Shandong	3:44.98	Xu Song; People's Liberation Army	3:45.93	Zhang Haikun; Shanghai	3:46.05
5000 metres	Lin Xiangqian; Jiangsu	13:38.77 PB	Tian Mengxu; Henan	13:39.53 PB	Jiang Bing; Shandong	13:39.61 PB
10,000 metres	Tian Mengxu; Henan	28:15.06 PB	Dong Guojian; Yunnan	28:17.60 PB	Yang Dinghong; People's Liberation Army	28:19.08 PB
110 metre hurdles	Liu Xiang; Shanghai	13.34	Ji Wei; People's Liberation Army	13.42	Shi Dongpeng; Hebei	13.63
400 metre hurdles	Meng Yan; Jilin	50.04	Li Guangjin; Inner Mongolia	50.75	Zhang Shibao; Shandong	50.95
3000 m steeplechase	Sun Wenli; Shandong	8:25.11 PB	Lin Xiangqian; Jiangsu	8:27.14 PB	Yang Tao; Ningxia	8:38.89 PB
4 × 100 m relay	Guangdong; Zheng Xiaodong; Liang Jiahong; Su Bingtian; Wen Yongyi	39.22	Sichuan; You Cheng; Xu Cheng; Huang Xiang; Yin Hualong	39.35	Beijing; Zhang Peimeng; Huang Minhua; Wang Xiaoxu; Xing Yanan	39.42
4 × 400 m relay	Guangdong; Chen Dayu; Cui Haojing; Wang Youxin; Liu Xiaosheng	3:06.37	Sichuan; Lin Yang; Liu Tong; Deng Shijie; You Cheng	3:07.44	Zhejiang; Yu Hui; Huang Long; Feng Dican; Zhou Jie	3:08.05
Marathon	Han Gang; Inner Mongolia	2:12:36	He Ping; Henan	2:12:53	Li Youcai; Yunnan	2:13:56
20 km walk	Wang Hao; Inner Mongolia	1:18:13 PB	Li Jianbo; Yunnan	1:19:10 PB	Chu Yafei; Inner Mongolia	1:20:27
50 km walk	Zhao Chengliang; Yunnan	3:40:33	Wang Hao; Inner Mongolia	3:41:55 PB	Si Tianfeng; Shandong	3:44:15
High jump	Zhang Shufeng; Heilongjiang	2.28	Wang Chen; Tianjin	2.26 PB	Huang Haiqiang; Zhejiang	2.23
Pole vault	Liu Feiliang; Shandong	5.60	Yang Quan; Shanghai	5.60 PB	Yang Yansheng; Shandong	5.50
Long jump	Zhang Xiaoyi; People's Liberation Army	8.27 PB	Li Jinzhe; Beijing	8.18 PB	Li Runrun; Jiangsu	8.06
Triple jump	Li Yanxi; Hebei	17.59 AR	Zhu Shujing; Zhejiang	17.41 PB	Cao Shuo; Hebei	16.90
Shot put	Jia Peng; Liaoning	19.20	Guo Yanxiang; Shandong	19.11	Xu Zhongnan; Heilongjiang	19.10 PB
Discus throw	Li Shaojie; Shandong	60.39	Wu Jian; Jiangsu	60.07	Tulake Nuermaimaiti; Xinjiang	57.07
Hammer throw	Ma Liang; Heilongjiang	71.01	Qi Dakai; Shaanxi	70.77	Zhao Yihai; Shandong	70.66
Javelin throw	Chen Qi; Shanghai	79.57	Zhao Qinggang; Liaoning	78.91	Wang Qingbo; Zhejiang	78.73
Decathlon	Qi Haifeng; Liaoning	7941	Yu Bin; Sichuan	7791	Zhu Hengjun; People's Liberation Army	7708 PB

=== Women ===
Event	Gold		Silver		Bronze	
100 metres	Jiang Lan; Jiangsu	11.50	Chen Jue; Jiangsu	11.51	Tao Yujia; Jiangxi	11.68
100 metres	Note: The original winner, Wang Jing of Fujian, won in 11.50 s but was later disqualified for using banned substances.					
200 metres	Chen Jue; Jiangsu	23.45 PB	Jiang Lan; Jiangsu	23.48	Wang Yingju; Fujian	23.79
400 metres	Huang Xiaoxiao; Shandong	52.23	Chen Lin; Shandong	52.96 PB	Chen Jingwen; Guangdong	53.10
800 metres	Zhou Haiyan; Liaoning	2:03.00 PB	Zhang Liqiu; Heilongjiang	2:04.03 PB	Li Yong; Heilongjiang	2:04.59 PB
1500 metres	Xue Fei; Jiangsu	4:18.26	Li Yong; Heilongjiang	4:18.35	Su Qian; Liaoning	4:18.60
5000 metres	Xue Fei; Jiangsu	15:11.72	Zhang Xin; Liaoning	15:13.30 PB	Zhu Yingying; Jiangsu	15:16.57 PB
10,000 metres	Bai Xue; Railways	31:17.62 PB	Zhu Yingying; Jiangsu	31:44.28 PB	Jia Chaofeng; Gansu	31:45.67 PB
100 m hurdles	Liu Jing; Sichuan	13.15	Sun Yawei; Jiangsu	13.17	Zhang Rong; Sichuan	13.40
400 m hurdles	Huang Xiaoxiao; Shandong	55.49	Pa Amei; Shanghai	56.73 PB	Yang Qi; Sichuan	56.83 PB
4 × 100 m relay	Guangxi; Huang Qiuju; Liang Qiuping; Han Ling; He Ying	44.32	Jiangsu; Liu Tingting; Chen Jue; Jiang Lan; Ma Xiaoyan	44.33	Zhejiang; Hu Lingling; Lai Weijie; Wang Xiaojiao; Zhu Juanhong	44.71
4 × 400 m relay	Guangdong; Chen Yanmei; Tang Xiaoyin; Qiu Jiehui; Chen Jingwen	3:30.63	Shandong; Jiao Congcong; Zhao Yanmin; Chen Lin; Huang Xiaoxiao	3:30.64	Shanghai; Li Qiuyan; Pa Amei; Zheng Zhihui; Du Luanluan	3:36.71
Marathon	Bai Xue; Railways	2:34:44	Zhang Xin; Liaoning	2:34:49	Zhu Xiaoling; Liaoning	2:34:55
20 km walk	Liu Hong; Guangdong	1:28:11	Li Yanfei; Shandong	1:28:57 PB	Bo Yanmin; Jiangsu	1:29:17
High jump	Zheng Xingjuan; Fujian	1.95 PB	Gu Xuan; People's Liberation Army Qiao Yanrui; Hebei	1.88	Not awarded	—
Pole vault	Wu Sha; Anhui	4.40 PB	Li Caixia; Shaanxi	4.40	Li Ling; Zhejiang	4:30
Long jump	Lu Minjia; Zhejiang	6.74 PB AYR	Chen Yaling; Anhui	6.58	Yao Jiajia; Liaoning	6.43
Triple jump	Chen Yufei; Shandong	14.11 PB	Xie Limei; Fujian	14.08	Liu Yanan; Hebei	14.04
Shot put	Gong Lijiao; Hebei	20.35 PB	Li Meiju; Hebei	19.38 PB	Li Ling; Liaoning	18.97
Discus throw	Li Yanfeng; Heilongjiang	66.40 PB	Song Aimin; Hebei	65.44 PB	Xu Shaoyang; Shandong	60.90
Hammer throw	Zhang Wenxiu; People's Liberation Army	74.25	Hao Shuai; Liaoning	67.63	Wang Zheng; Shaanxi	64.61
Javelin throw	Liu Chunhua; Hunan	60.65 PB	Zhang Li; People's Liberation Army	59.94	Ma Ning; Hebei	58.99
Heptathlon	Mei Yiduo; Liaoning	5689 PB	Liu Haili; Liaoning	5668	Sun Lu; Liaoning	5363 PB

== Medal table ==
* Host nation (Shandong)

Rank	Nation	Gold	Silver	Bronze	Total
1	Jiangsu	7	8	3	18
2	Shandong*	7	6	7	20
3	Liaoning	5	5	5	15
4	Heilongjiang	4	2	2	8
5	Guangdong	4	1	1	6
6	People's Liberation Army	2	4	2	8
7	Hebei	2	3	4	9
8	Shanghai	2	3	2	7
9	Railway	2	0	0	2
10	Fujian	1	2	3	6
10	Sichuan	1	2	3	6
12	Yunnan	1	2	2	5
13	Henan	1	2	0	3
13	Inner Mongolia	1	2	0	3
15	Zhejiang	1	1	5	7
16	Anhui	1	1	0	2
17	Chongqing	1	0	0	1
17	Guangxi	1	0	0	1
17	Hunan	1	0	0	1
17	Jilin	1	0	0	1
17	Shanxi	1	0	0	1
22	Beijing	0	2	2	4
23	Tianjin	0	2	0	2
24	Shaanxi	0	1	1	2
25	Gansu	0	0	1	1
25	Jiangxi	0	0	1	1
25	Ningxia	0	0	1	1
28	Xinjiang	0	0	0	0
Totals (28 entries)		47	49	45	141
