= 2009 Asian Athletics Championships – Women's 4 × 100 metres relay =

The women's 4 × 100 metres relay event at the 2009 Asian Athletics Championships was held at the Guangdong Olympic Stadium on November 12–14.

== Medalists ==
Gold	Silver	Bronze
Japan; Maki Wada; Chisato Fukushima; Mayumi Watanabe; Momoko Takahashi; Asuka Terada*	Thailand; Jintara Seangdee; Phatsorn Jaksuninkorn; Juthamas Tawoncharoen; Nongnuch Sanrat	South Korea; Lee Sun-ae; Kim Ji-eun; Kim Ha-na; Kim Cho-rong

* Athletes who participated in heats only.

== Results ==
=== Heats ===
Rank	Heat	Nation	Athletes	Time	Notes
1	2	Japan	Asuka Terada, Chisato Fukushima, Mayumi Watanabe, Momoko Takahashi	44.34	Q
2	1	Thailand	Jintara Seangdee, Phatsorn Jaksuninkorn, Juthamas Tawoncharoen, Nongnuch Sanrat	44.90	Q
3	2	South Korea	Lee Sun-ae, Kim Ji-eun, Kim Ha-na, Kim Cho-rong	45.96	Q
4	1	Vietnam	Nguyen Thi Tham, Le Ngoc Phuong, Do Thi Ly, Vu Thi Huong	46.04	Q
5	1	Chinese Taipei	Liao Ching-hsien, Chuang Shu-chuan, Chen Shu-chuan, Lin Yi-chun	46.04	Q
6	1	India	Mandeep Kaur, Sowjanya Karnatapu, Premachandram Kanchana Priya, Sharadha Narayana	46.51	q
7	1	Hong Kong	Lam On Ki, Leung Hau Sze, Wan Kin Yee, Hui Man Li Ng	46.52	q
	2	China	Tao Yujia, Liang Qiuping, Jiang Lan, Chen Jue	DQ	
	2	Sri Lanka	Priyadharshani, Achala Shalika Dias, Shashiprabha Jayasinghe, Pemila Priyadharshani Delapalage	DNF	

=== Final ===
Rank	Lane	Team	Name	Time	Notes
1st place, gold medalist(s)	6	Japan	Maki Wada, Chisato Fukushima, Mayumi Watanabe, Momoko Takahashi	43.93	
2nd place, silver medalist(s)	3	Thailand	Jintara Seangdee, Phatsorn Jaksuninkorn, Juthamas Tawoncharoen, Nongnuch Sanrat	44.55	
3rd place, bronze medalist(s)	4	South Korea	Lee Sun-ae, Kim Ji-eun, Kim Ha-na, Kim Cho-rong	45.46	
4	5	Vietnam	Nguyen Thi Tham, Le Ngoc Phuong, Do Thi Ly, Vu Thi Huong	45.55	
5	8	Chinese Taipei	Liao Ching-hsien, Chuang Shu-chuan, Chen Shu-chuan, Lin Yi-chun	45.81	
6	2	Hong Kong	Lam On Ki, Leung Hau Sze, Wan Kin Yee, Chan Ho Yee	46.45	
	7	India	Premachandram Kanchana Priya, Nidhi, Jyothi Hiriyur Manjunath, Sharadha Narayana	DQ	
