= 2010 IAAF Continental Cup – Results =

These are the results of the 2010 IAAF Continental Cup, which took place in Split, Croatia on 4 and 5 September 2010.

== Men ==
=== Track ===
Events
100 m	200 m	400 m	800 m	1500 m	3000 m	5000 m	110 m h	400 m h	3000 m st	4 × 100 m relay	4 × 400 m relay

==== Men's 100 metres ====
Rank	Lane	Athlete	Nationality	Team	React	Time	Points	Notes
1st place, gold medalist(s)	3	Christophe Lemaitre	France	Europe	0.153	10.06	8	
2nd place, silver medalist(s)	2	Daniel Bailey	Antigua and Barbuda	Americas	0.146	10.10	7	
3rd place, bronze medalist(s)	7	Mark Lewis-Francis	Great Britain	Europe	0.166	10.16	6	SB
4	6	Monzavous Edwards	United States	Americas	0.143	10.23	5	
5	4	Ben-Youssef Méité	Ivory Coast	Africa	0.159	10.32	4	
6	5	Lao Yi	China	Asia-Pacific	0.162	10.38	3	
7	1	Aaron Rouge-Serret	Australia	Asia-Pacific	0.153	10.45	2	
	8	Aziz Zakari	Ghana	Africa		DSQ		

==== Men's 200 metres ====
Rank	Lane	Athlete	Nationality	Team	React	Time	Points	Notes
1st place, gold medalist(s)	5	Wallace Spearmon	United States	Americas	0.169	19.95	8	
2nd place, silver medalist(s)	1	Churandy Martina	Netherlands Antilles	Americas	0.180	20.47	7	
3rd place, bronze medalist(s)	7	Ben-Youssef Méité	Ivory Coast	Africa	0.228	20.51	6	
4	6	Christian Malcolm	United Kingdom	Europe	0.161	20.75	5	
5	4	Kenji Fujimitsu	Japan	Asia-Pacific	0.179	20.80	4	
6	3	Amr Ibrahim Mostafa Seoud	Egypt	Africa	0.152	20.94	3	
7	8	Matt Davies	Australia	Asia-Pacific	0.304	22.03	2	
	2	Jaysuma Saidy Ndure	Norway	Europe	0.155	DNF		

==== Men's 400 metres ====
Rank	Lane	Athlete	Nationality	Team	React	Time	Points	Notes
1st place, gold medalist(s)	6	Jeremy Wariner	United States	Americas	0.172	44.22	8	CR
2nd place, silver medalist(s)	2	Ricardo Chambers	Jamaica	Americas	0.153	44.59	7	
3rd place, bronze medalist(s)	3	Michael Bingham	Great Britain	Europe	0.145	44.84	6	SB
4	7	Kevin Borlée	Belgium	Europe	0.166	45.01	5	SB
5	8	Rabah Yousif	Sudan	Africa	0.174	45.45	4	
6	5	Ben Offereins	Australia	Asia-Pacific	0.192	45.94	3	
7	1	Yuzo Kanemaru	Japan	Asia-Pacific	0.150	45.95	2	
8	4	Mohamed Khouaja	Libya	Africa	0.208	45.99	1	

==== Men's 800 metres ====
Rank	Lane	Athlete	Nationality	Team	Time	Points	Notes
1st place, gold medalist(s)	6	David Rudisha	Kenya	Africa	1:43.27	8	CR
2nd place, silver medalist(s)	5	Marcin Lewandowski	Poland	Europe	1:44.81	7	
3rd place, bronze medalist(s)	3	Belal Mansoor Ali	Bahrain	Asia-Pacific	1:44.92	6	
4	8	Kléberson Davide	Brazil	Americas	1:44.96	5	
5	4	Nick Symmonds	United States	Americas	1:44.98	4	
6	1	Michael Rimmer	Great Britain	Europe	1:45.91	3	
7	2	Shiferaw Wola	Ethiopia	Africa	1:46.56	2	
8	7	Tristan Garrett	Australia	Asia-Pacific	1:50.32	1	

==== Men's 1500 metres ====
Rank	Athlete	Nationality	Team	Time	Points	Notes
1st place, gold medalist(s)	Amine Laâlou	Morocco	Africa	3:35.49	8	
2nd place, silver medalist(s)	Mekonnen Gebremedhin	Ethiopia	Africa	3:35.70	7	
3rd place, bronze medalist(s)	Leonel Manzano	United States	Americas	3:36.48	6	
4	Arturo Casado	Spain	Europe	3:37.43	5	
5	Andrew Baddeley	Great Britain	Europe	3:38.41	4	
6	Asbel Kiprop	Kenya	Africa	3:38.81		
7	Yoann Kowal	France	Europe	3:39.30		
8	Taylor Milne	Canada	Americas	3:39.94	3	
9	Mohammed Shaween	Saudi Arabia	Asia-Pacific	3:40.75	2	
10	Mitchell Kealey	Australia	Asia-Pacific	3:41.51	1	

==== Men's 3000 metres ====
Rank	Athlete	Nationality	Team	Time	Points	Notes
1st place, gold medalist(s)	Bernard Lagat	United States	Americas	7:54.75	8	
2nd place, silver medalist(s)	Moses Ndiema Kipsiro	Uganda	Africa	7:54.98	7	SB
3rd place, bronze medalist(s)	Bayron Piedra	Ecuador	Americas	7:55.52	6	
4	Tariku Bekele	Ethiopia	Africa	7:55.79	5	
5	Vincent Kipsegechi Yator	Kenya	Africa	7:57.46		
6	Adrian Blincoe	New Zealand	Asia-Pacific	7:57.67	4	
7	Daniele Meucci	Italy	Europe	7:57.98	3	SB
8	Ben St. Lawrence	Australia	Asia-Pacific	7:58.55	2	
9	Mateusz Demczyszak	Poland	Europe	7:59.92	1	
10	Noureddine Smaïl	France	Europe	8:11.66		
11	Diego Alberto Borrego	Mexico	Americas	8:12.92		SB

==== Men's 5000 metres ====
Rank	Athlete	Nationality	Team	Time	Points	Notes
1st place, gold medalist(s)	Bernard Lagat	United States	Americas	13:58.23	8	
2nd place, silver medalist(s)	Moses Ndiema Kipsiro	Uganda	Africa	13:58.35	7	
3rd place, bronze medalist(s)	Bouabdellah Tahri	France	Europe	13:58.79	6	
4	Edwin Soi	Kenya	Africa	13:59.04	5	
5	Imane Merga	Ethiopia	Africa	14:00.53		
6	Collis Birmingham	Australia	Asia-Pacific	14:00.60	4	
7	Serhiy Lebid	Ukraine	Europe	14:00.73	3	
8	Mert Girmalegesse	Turkey	Europe	14:05.24		
9	Diego Alberto Borrego	Mexico	Americas	14:19.58	2	

==== Men's 110 metre hurdles ====
Rank	Lane	Athlete	Nationality	Team	React	Time	Points	Notes
1st place, gold medalist(s)	3	David Oliver	United States	Americas	0.159	13.11	8	
2nd place, silver medalist(s)	4	Andy Turner	Great Britain	Europe	0.162	13.48	7	
3rd place, bronze medalist(s)	2	Shi Dongpeng	China	Asia-Pacific	0.153	13.53	6	
4	8	Garfield Darien	France	Europe	0.161	13.75	5	
5	1	Selim Nurudeen	Nigeria	Africa	0.148	13.76	4	
6	5	Athmane Hadj Lazib	Algeria	Africa	0.226	13.89	3	
7	6	Tasuku Tanonaka	Japan	Asia-Pacific	0.156	13.92	2	
8	7	Dominique DeGrammont	Haiti	Americas	0.164	14.18	1	

==== Men's 400 metre hurdles ====
Rank	Lane	Athlete	Nationality	Team	React	Time	Points	Notes
1st place, gold medalist(s)	6	David Greene	Great Britain	Europe	0.161	47.88	8	PB
2nd place, silver medalist(s)	1	Javier Culson	Puerto Rico	Americas	0.169	48.08	7	
3rd place, bronze medalist(s)	5	Bershawn Jackson	United States	Americas	0.161	48.62	6	
4	7	Mamadou Kasse Hann	Senegal	Africa	0.189	48.89	5	PB
5	3	L. J. van Zyl	South Africa	Africa	0.184	49.97	4	
6	2	Héni Kechi	France	Europe	0.148	50.01	3	
7	8	Brendan Cole	Australia	Asia-Pacific		50.37	2	
8	4	Takayuki Koike	Japan	Asia-Pacific	0.183	54.45	1	

==== Men's 3000 metre steeplechase ====
Rank	Athlete	Nationality	Team	Time	Points	Notes
1st place, gold medalist(s)	Richard Mateelong	Kenya	Africa	8:09.67	8	CR
2nd place, silver medalist(s)	Roba Gari	Ethiopia	Africa	8:09.87	7	NR
3rd place, bronze medalist(s)	Mahiedine Mekhissi-Benabbad	France	Europe	8:09.96	6	
4	Benjamin Kiplagat	Uganda	Africa	8:14.47		
5	Ion Luchianov	Moldova	Europe	8:22.86	5	
6	Youcef Abdi	Australia	Asia-Pacific	8:23.39	4	SB
7	Tareq Mubarak Taher	Qatar	Asia-Pacific	8:26.54	3	
8	Daniel Huling	United States	Americas	8:27.59	2	
9	José Alberto Sánchez	Cuba	Americas	8:48.11	1	
DSQ	José Luis Blanco	Spain	Europe	8:48.79		

==== Men's 4 × 100 metres relay ====
Rank	Lane	Team	Athlete	Time	Points	Notes
1st place, gold medalist(s)	5	Americas	Daniel Bailey (ATG), Wallace Spearmon (USA), Tyson Gay (USA), Churandy Martina (AHO)	38.25	15	
2nd place, silver medalist(s)	4	Asia-Pacific	Shinji Takahira (JPN), Naoki Tsukahara (JPN), Kenji Fujimitsu (JPN), Shintaro Kimura (JPN)	39.28	11	
3rd place, bronze medalist(s)	3	Africa	Hannes Dreyer (ZAF), Simon Magakwe (ZAF), Wilhelm van der Vyver (ZAF), Thuso Mpuang (ZAF)	39.82	7	
	6	Europe	Imaad Halley (FRA), Christophe Lemaitre (FRA), Pierre-Alexis Pessonneaux (FRA), Teddy Tinmar (FRA)	DSQ		

==== Men's 4 × 400 metres relay ====
Rank	Lane	Team	Athlete	Time	Points	Notes
1st place, gold medalist(s)	6	Americas	Nery Brenes (CRC), Bershawn Jackson (USA), Greg Nixon (USA), Ricardo Chambers (JAM)	2:59.00	15	CR
2nd place, silver medalist(s)	3	Europe	Michael Bingham (GBR), Kevin Borlée (BEL), Vladimir Krasnov (RUS), Martyn Rooney (GBR)	2:59.84	11	
3rd place, bronze medalist(s)	4	Africa	Gary Kikaya (COD), Mark Kiprotich Mutai (KEN), Mohamed Khouaja (LBA), Rabah Yousif (SUD)	3:02.62	7	
4	5	Asia-Pacific	Joel Milburn (AUS), Ben Offereins (AUS), Brendan Cole (AUS), Kevin Moore (AUS)	3:03.66	3	

=== Field ===
Events
High jump	Pole vault	Long jump	Triple jump	Shot put	Discus throw	Hammer throw	Javelin throw

==== Men's high jump ====
Rank	Athlete	Nationality	Team	1.98	2.07	2.15	2.21	2.25	2.28	2.31	Result	Points	Notes
1st place, gold medalist(s)	Rashid Ahmed Al-Mannai	Qatar	Asia-Pacific	–	o	o	xo	xo	o	xxx	2.28	8	PB
2nd place, silver medalist(s)	Donald Thomas	Bahamas	Americas	-	-	o	o	xo	xxo	xxx	2.28	7	
3rd place, bronze medalist(s)	Martyn Bernard	United Kingdom	Europe	-	-	xxo	xo	o	xxx		2.25	6	
4	Kabelo Kgosiemang	Botswana	Africa	-	-	o	o	xo	xxx		2.25	5	
5	Lee Hup Wei	Malaysia	Asia-Pacific	-	o	xxo	xxo	xo	xxx		2.25	4	
6	Dusty Jonas	United States	Americas	-	-	xo	xo	xxx			2.21	3	
7	Mihail Dudaš	Serbia	Europe	o	xxx						1.98	2	
	Laarbi Bouraada	Algeria	Africa	xxx							NM		

==== Men's pole vault ====
Rank	Athlete	Nationality	Team	4.40	4.60	4.80	5.00	5.20	5.40	5.55	5.65	5.75	5.80	5.85	5.90	5.95	Result	Points	Notes
1st place, gold medalist(s)	Steven Hooker	Australia	Asia-Pacific	-	-	-	-	-	xo	-	o	xo	-	x-	o	xxo	5.95	8	CR
2nd place, silver medalist(s)	Renaud Lavillenie	France	Europe	-	-	-	-	-	o	-	o	-	o	o	o	xxx	5.90	7	
3rd place, bronze medalist(s)	Derek Miles	United States	Americas	-	-	-	-	-	xo	-	xo	xo	xxx				5.75	6	
4	Maksym Mazuryk	Ukraine	Europe	-	-	-	-	-	o	xo	o	xxx					5.65	5	
5	Yang Yansheng	China	Asia-Pacific	-	-	-	-	o	xx-	o	-						5.55	4	
6	Giovanni Lanaro	Mexico	Americas	-	-	-	-	xo	o	xxx							5.40	3	
7	Laarbi Bouraada	Algeria	Africa	xo	o	xo	xxx										4.80	2	=PB
	Hamdi Dhouibi	Tunisia	Africa														DNS		

==== Men's long jump ====
Rank	Athlete	Nationality	Team	#1	#2	#3	#4	Result	Points	Notes
1st place, gold medalist(s)	Dwight Phillips	United States	Americas	8.34	x	x	x	8.34	8	
2nd place, silver medalist(s)	Kafétien Gomis	France	Europe	7.89	7.82	x	8.10	8.10	7	
3rd place, bronze medalist(s)	Christian Reif	Germany	Europe	7.27	7.68	7.90	7.99	7.99	6	
4	Li Jinzhe	China	Asia-Pacific	7.60	7.92	7.93	x	7.93	5	
5	Tyrone Smith	Bermuda	Americas	7.91	7.90	7.68	7.78	7.91	4	
6	Ndiss Kaba Badji	Senegal	Africa	7.30	7.87	7.59	x	7.87	3	
7	Fabrice Lapierre	Australia	Asia-Pacific	6.05	7.53	7.70	7.59	7.70	2	
8	Laarbi Bouraada	Algeria	Africa	6.66	7.12	-	-	7.12	1	

==== Men's triple jump ====
Rank	Athlete	Nationality	Team	#1	#2	#3	#4	Result	Points	Notes
1st place, gold medalist(s)	Marian Oprea	Romania	Europe	17.11	x	17.20	17.29	17.29	8	
2nd place, silver medalist(s)	Alexis Copello	Cuba	Americas	17.25	x	x	17.09	17.25	7	
3rd place, bronze medalist(s)	Phillips Idowu	Great Britain	Europe	17.24	15.91	-	17.13	17.24	6	
4	Hugo Mamba-Schlick	Cameroon	Africa	16.45	16.67	16.60	16.90	16.90	5	SB
5	Randy Lewis	Grenada	Americas	x	16.79	x	16.85	16.85	4	
6	Tosin Oke	Nigeria	Africa	x	x	16.68	16.72	16.72	3	
7	Renjith Maheshwary	India	Asia-Pacific	15.85	x	16.42	16.69	16.69	2	
8	Roman Valiyev	Kazakhstan	Asia-Pacific	x	15.81	x	14.46	15.81	1	

==== Men's shot put ====
Rank	Athlete	Nationality	Team	#1	#2	#3	#4	Result	Points	Notes
1st place, gold medalist(s)	Christian Cantwell	United States	Americas	21.41	21.87	21.53	21.53	21.87	8	
2nd place, silver medalist(s)	Tomasz Majewski	Poland	Europe	20.73	20.87	21.22	20.78	21.22	7	
3rd place, bronze medalist(s)	Scott Martin	Australia	Asia-Pacific	19.23	19.12	x	20.10	20.10	6	
4	Dylan Armstrong	Canada	Americas	x	19.70	x	x	19.70	5	
5	Burger Lambrechts	South Africa	Africa	18.58	18.81	x	x	18.81	4	
6	Sultan Al-Hebshi	Saudi Arabia	Asia-Pacific	16.98	17.23	17.68	x	17.68	3	
7	Frank Elemba	Republic of the Congo	Africa	14.98	15.55	15.80	15.83	15.83	2	
DQ	Andrei Mikhnevich	Belarus	Europe	20.68	20.40	x	x	20.68	0	

==== Men's discus throw ====
Rank	Athlete	Nationality	Team	#1	#2	#3	#4	Result	Points	Notes
1st place, gold medalist(s)	Robert Harting	Germany	Europe	65.52	66.85	66.07	x	66.85	8	
2nd place, silver medalist(s)	Benn Harradine	Australia	Asia-Pacific	64.72	66.45	64.90	65.20	66.45	7	AR
3rd place, bronze medalist(s)	Ehsan Haddadi	Iran	Asia-Pacific	57.54	63.41	64.55	62.30	64.55	6	
4	Piotr Małachowski	Poland	Europe	62.86	62.76	64.20	x	64.20	5	
5	Jason Young	United States	Americas	59.00	59.32	x	61.33	61.33	4	
6	Jorge Fernández	Cuba	Americas	58.60	60.73	x	61.18	61.18	3	
7	Omar Ahmed El Ghazaly	Egypt	Africa	59.08	59.87	59.17	60.00	60.00	2	
8	Victor Hogan	South Africa	Africa	54.86	x	x	x	54.86	1	

==== Men's hammer throw ====
Rank	Athlete	Nationality	Team	#1	#2	#3	#4	Result	Points	Notes
1st place, gold medalist(s)	Libor Charfreitag	Slovakia	Europe	77.76	76.31	79.69	x	79.69	8	
2nd place, silver medalist(s)	Dilshod Nazarov	Tajikistan	Asia-Pacific	76.22	78.08	76.99	78.76	78.76	7	
3rd place, bronze medalist(s)	Ali Al-Zinkawi	Kuwait	Asia-Pacific	x	74.16	74.72	76.73	76.73	6	
4	Nicola Vizzoni	Italy	Europe	75.32	75.94	x	75.80	75.94	5	
5	Roberto Janet	Cuba	Americas	74.06	74.87	72.54	x	74.87	4	
6	A. G. Kruger	United States	Americas	x	74.00	x	x	74.00	3	
7	Chris Harmse	South Africa	Africa	x	x	71.06	x	71.06	2	
8	Mohsen El Anany	Egypt	Africa	69.17	67.65	69.77	69.37	69.77	1	

==== Men's javelin throw ====
Rank	Athlete	Nationality	Team	#1	#2	#3	#4	Result	Points	Notes
1st place, gold medalist(s)	Andreas Thorkildsen	Norway	Europe	78.94	84.81	84.06	89.26	89.26	8	CR
2nd place, silver medalist(s)	Gerhardus Pienaar	South Africa	Africa	76.93	x	78.00	83.17	83.17	7	SB
3rd place, bronze medalist(s)	Matthias de Zordo	Germany	Europe	80.00	81.93	x	82.89	82.89	6	
4	Jarrod Bannister	Australia	Asia-Pacific	78.86	78.85	79.18	79.99	79.99	5	
5	Stuart Farquhar	New Zealand	Asia-Pacific	77.58	78.29	-	-	78.29	4	
6	Ihab Al Sayed Abdelrahman	Egypt	Africa	72.14	74.11	x	x	74.11	3	
7	Arley Ibargüen	Colombia	Americas	x	73.73	x	x	73.73	2	
8	Mike Hazle	United States	Americas	69.99	x	70.71	73.18	73.18	1	

== Women ==
=== Track ===
Events
100 m	200 m	400 m	800 m	1500 m	3000 m	5000 m	100 m h	400 m h	3000 m st	4 × 100 m relay	4 × 400 m relay

==== Women's 100 metres ====
Rank	Lane	Athlete	Nationality	Team	React	Time	Points	Notes
1st place, gold medalist(s)	5	Kelly-Ann Baptiste	Trinidad and Tobago	Americas	0.174	11.05	8	
2nd place, silver medalist(s)	1	Shalonda Solomon	United States	Americas	0.167	11.09	7	
3rd place, bronze medalist(s)	6	Blessing Okagbare	Nigeria	Africa	0.152	11.14	6	
4	4	Verena Sailer	Germany	Europe	0.152	11.26	5	
5	8	Ezinne Okparaebo	Norway	Europe	0.145	11.37	4	
6	3	Chisato Fukushima	Japan	Asia-Pacific	0.154	11.42	3	
7	2	Ruddy Zang Milama	Gabon	Africa	0.161	11.49	2	
8	7	Melissa Breen	Australia	Asia-Pacific	0.181	11.58	1	

==== Women's 200 metres ====
Rank	Lane	Athlete	Nationality	Team	React	Time	Points	Notes
1st place, gold medalist(s)	7	Aleksandra Fedoriva	Russia	Europe	0.184	22.86	8	
2nd place, silver medalist(s)	3	Yelizaveta Bryzhina	Ukraine	Europe	0.221	23.37	7	
3rd place, bronze medalist(s)	4	Cydonie Mothersille	Cayman Islands	Americas	0.244	23.41	6	
4	8	Consuella Moore	United States	Americas	0.301	23.52	5	
5	5	Oludamola Osayomi	Nigeria	Africa	0.185	23.84	4	
6	6	Jody Henry	Australia	Asia-Pacific	0.152	24.02	3	
7	1	Estie Wittstock	South Africa	Africa	0.180	24.05	2	
8	2	Momoko Takahashi	Japan	Asia-Pacific	0.178	24.27	1	

==== Women's 400 metres ====
Rank	Lane	Athlete	Nationality	Team	React	Time	Points	Notes
1st place, gold medalist(s)	6	Amantle Montsho	Botswana	Africa	0.197	49.39	8	SB
2nd place, silver medalist(s)	5	Debbie Dunn	United States	Americas	0.173	49.71	7	
3rd place, bronze medalist(s)	4	Tatyana Firova	Russia	Europe	0.170	49.95	6	
4	1	Shericka Williams	Jamaica	Americas	0.197	50.70	5	
5	2	Amy Mbacké Thiam	Senegal	Africa	0.192	51.46	4	
6	8	Libania Grenot	Italy	Europe	0.217	51.74	3	
7	3	Jody Henry	Australia	Asia-Pacific	0.162	52.52	2	
8	7	Asami Chiba	Japan	Asia-Pacific	0.199	53.38	1	SB

==== Women's 800 metres ====
Rank	Lane	Athlete	Nationality	Team	Time	Points	Notes
1st place, gold medalist(s)	8	Janeth Jepkosgei	Kenya	Africa	1:57.88	8	
2nd place, silver medalist(s)	3	Kenia Sinclair	Jamaica	Americas	1:58.16	7	SB
3rd place, bronze medalist(s)	2	Mariya Savinova	Russia	Europe	1:58.27	6	
4	6	Jenny Meadows	Great Britain	Europe	1:58.88	5	
5	5	Tintu Luka	India	Asia-Pacific	1:59.17	4	NR
6	4	Zahra Bouras	Algeria	Africa	1:59.61	3	
7	1	Nikki Hamblin	New Zealand	Asia-Pacific	1:59.66	2	PB
8	7	Alysia Johnson	United States	Americas	2:01.83	1	

==== Women's 1500 metres ====
Rank	Athlete	Nationality	Team	Time	Points	Notes
1st place, gold medalist(s)	Hind Dehiba	France	Europe	4:19.78	8	
2nd place, silver medalist(s)	Nicole Edwards	Canada	Americas	4:21.34	7	
3rd place, bronze medalist(s)	Christin Wurth-Thomas	United States	Americas	4:21.46	6	
4	Mimi Belete	Bahrain	Asia-Pacific	4:22.27	5	
5	Aslı Çakır	Turkey	Europe	4:22.43	4	
6	Nikki Hamblin	New Zealand	Asia-Pacific	4:22.45	3	
7	Gelete Burka	Ethiopia	Africa	4:23.76	2	
8	Nancy Langat	Kenya	Africa	4:23.93	1	
9	Kaila McKnight	Australia	Asia-Pacific	4:27.40		
	Btissam Lakhouad	Morocco	Africa	DNF		

==== Women's 3000 metres ====
Rank	Athlete	Nationality	Team	Time	Points	Notes
1st place, gold medalist(s)	Meseret Defar	Ethiopia	Africa	9:03.33	8	
2nd place, silver medalist(s)	Shannon Rowbury	United States	Americas	9:04.82	7	
3rd place, bronze medalist(s)	Malindi Elmore	Canada	Americas	9:05.75	6	
4	Iness Chepkesis Chenonge	Kenya	Africa	9:07.18	5	
5	Tejitu Daba	Bahrain	Asia-Pacific	9:08.86	4	
6	Sara Moreira	Portugal	Europe	9:10.37	3	
7	Yuriko Kobayashi	Japan	Asia-Pacific	9:10.92	2	
8	Kaila McKnight	Australia	Asia-Pacific	9:24.50		
	Btissam Lakhouad	Morocco	Africa	DNS		
	Alemitu Bekele	Turkey	Europe	DSQ	0	

==== Women's 5000 metres ====
Rank	Athlete	Nationality	Team	Time	Points	Notes
1st place, gold medalist(s)	Vivian Cheruiyot	Kenya	Africa	16:05.74	8	
2nd place, silver medalist(s)	Sentayehu Ejigu	Ethiopia	Africa	16:07.11	7	
3rd place, bronze medalist(s)	Molly Huddle	United States	Americas	16:08.60	6	
4	Elvan Abeylegesse	Turkey	Europe	16:10.36	5	
5	Zakia Mrisho Mohamed	Tanzania	Africa	16:12.94		
6	Shitaye Eshete	Bahrain	Asia-Pacific	16:15.47	4	
7	Jéssica Augusto	Portugal	Europe	16:18.20	3	
8	Megan Wright	Canada	Americas	16:29.63	2	

==== Women's 100 metre hurdles ====
Rank	Lane	Athlete	Nationality	Team	React	Time	Points	Notes
1st place, gold medalist(s)	4	Sally Pearson	Australia	Asia-Pacific	0.138	12.65	8	
2nd place, silver medalist(s)	6	Lolo Jones	United States	Americas	0.143	12.66	7	
3rd place, bronze medalist(s)	2	Perdita Felicien	Canada	Americas	0.149	12.68	6	
4	5	Nevin Yanıt	Turkey	Europe	0.149	12.84	5	
5	1	Derval O'Rourke	Ireland	Europe	0.142	12.99	4	
6	3	Seun Adigun	Nigeria	Africa	0.159	13.48	3	
7	7	Gnima Faye	Senegal	Africa	0.251	13.58	2	
8	8	Asuka Terada	Japan	Asia-Pacific		13.67	1	

==== Women's 400 metre hurdles ====
Rank	Lane	Athlete	Nationality	Team	React	Time	Points	Notes
1st place, gold medalist(s)	4	Nickiesha Wilson	Jamaica	Americas	0.202	54.52	8	SB
2nd place, silver medalist(s)	1	Muizat Ajoke Odumosu	Nigeria	Africa	0.184	54.59	7	NR
3rd place, bronze medalist(s)	7	Vania Stambolova	Bulgaria	Europe	0.227	54.89	6	
4	3	Natalya Antyukh	Russia	Europe	0.172	55.19	5	
5	6	Lauren Boden	Australia	Asia-Pacific	0.174	55.30	4	
6	8	Nicole Leach	United States	Americas	0.225	55.64	3	
7	6	Hayat Lambarki	Morocco	Africa	0.226	59.03	2	

==== Women's 3000 metre steeplechase ====
Rank	Athlete	Nationality	Team	Time	Points	Notes
1st place, gold medalist(s)	Yuliya Zarudneva	Russia	Europe	9:25.46	8	CR
2nd place, silver medalist(s)	Milcah Chemos Cheywa	Kenya	Africa	9:25.84	7	
3rd place, bronze medalist(s)	Sofia Assefa	Ethiopia	Africa	9:29.53	6	
4	Hanane Ouhaddou	Morocco	Africa	9:39.39		SB
5	Lisa Aguilera	United States	Americas	9:41.48	5	
6	Korene Hinds	Jamaica	Americas	9:45.08	4	
7	Hatti Dean	Great Britain	Europe	9:45.36	3	
8	Li Zhenzhu	China	Asia-Pacific	9:47.28	2	SB
9	Sophie Duarte	France	Europe	9:49.93		
10	Minori Hayakari	Japan	Asia-Pacific	10:04.97	1	

==== Women's 4 × 100 metres relay ====
Rank	Lane	Team	Athlete	Time	Points	Notes
1st place, gold medalist(s)	4	Americas	Cydonie Mothersille, Debbie Ferguson-McKenzie, Shalonda Solomon, Kelly-Ann Baptiste	43.07	15	
2nd place, silver medalist(s)	3	Europe	Olesya Povkh, Nataliya Pohrebnyak, Mariya Ryemyen, Yelizaveta Bryzhina	43.77	11	
3rd place, bronze medalist(s)	5	Africa	Ruddy Zang Milama, Agnes Osazuwa, Oludamola Osayomi, Blessing Okagbare	43.88	7	
4	6	Asia-Pacific	Maki Wada, Chisato Fukushima, Yumeka Sano, Momoko Takahashi	44.54	3	

==== Women's 4 × 400 metres relay ====
Rank	Lane	Team	Athlete	Time	Points	Notes
1st place, gold medalist(s)	5	Americas	Shericka Williams, Debbie Dunn, Nickiesha Wilson, Christine Amertil	3:26.37	15	
2nd place, silver medalist(s)	4	Europe	Kseniya Ustalova, Antonina Krivoshapka, Libania Grenot, Tatyana Firova	3:26.58	11	
3rd place, bronze medalist(s)	6	Africa	Folashade Abugan, Amy Mbacké Thiam, Ndeye Soumah, Amantle Montsho	3:27.99	7	
4	3	Asia-Pacific	Lauren Boden, Jody Henry, Olivia Tauro, Amanda Crook	3:33.32	3	

=== Field ===
Events
High jump	Pole vault	Long jump	Triple jump	Shot put	Discus throw	Hammer throw	Javelin throw

==== Women's high jump ====
Rank	Athlete	Nationality	Team	1.64	1.72	1.78	1.83	1.88	1.92	1.95	1.98	2.00	2.02	2.05	2.10	Result	Points	Notes
1st place, gold medalist(s)	Blanka Vlašić	Croatia	Europe	-	-	-	-	o	o	o	-	o	o	o	xxx	2.05	8	CR, =WL
2nd place, silver medalist(s)	Emma Green	Sweden	Europe	-	-	-	o	xo	xxo	xxo	-	x-	xx			1.95	7	
3rd place, bronze medalist(s)	Levern Spencer	Saint Lucia	Americas	-	-	-	o	xo	xxx							1.88	5.5	
3rd place, bronze medalist(s)	Nadiya Dusanova	Uzbekistan	Asia-Pacific	-	-	o	o	xo	xxx							1.88	5.5	
5	Anna Ustinova	Kazakhstan	Asia-Pacific	-	-	o	o	xxo	xxx							1.88	4	
6	Lesyanis Mayor	Cuba	Americas	-	o	o	xxx									1.78	3	
7	Selloane Tsoaeli	Lesotho	Africa	o	o	xxo	xxx									1.78	2	NR
8	Margaret Simpson	Ghana	Africa	o	xxo	xxx										1.72	1	

==== Women's pole vault ====
Rank	Athlete	Nationality	Team	3.20	3.40	3.60	3.80	4.00	4.20	4.35	4.50	4.60	4.70	4.75	Result	Points	Notes
1st place, gold medalist(s)	Svetlana Feofanova	Russia	Europe	-	-	-	-	-	-	o	o	xo	xxo	-	4.70	8	CR
2nd place, silver medalist(s)	Lisa Ryzih	Germany	Europe	-	-	-	o	-	o	o	o	o	xxx		4.60	7	
3rd place, bronze medalist(s)	Fabiana Murer	Brazil	Americas	-	-	-	-	-	-	xxo	xo	xx-	x		4.50	6	
4	Li Caixia	China	Asia-Pacific	-	-	-	-	o	xo	xo	xxo	xxx			4.50	5	PB
5	Becky Holliday	United States	Americas	-	-	-	-	-	o	o	xxx				4.35	4	
6	Alana Boyd	Australia	Asia-Pacific	-	-	-	o	o	xo	xxo	xxx				4.35	3	
7	Laetitia Berthier	Burundi	Africa	o	xxo	xxx									3.40	2	
	Nisrine Dinar	Morocco	Africa	-	xxx										NM		

==== Women's long jump ====
Rank	Athlete	Nationality	Team	#1	#2	#3	#4	Result	Points	Notes
1st place, gold medalist(s)	Yuliya Tarasova	Uzbekistan	Asia-Pacific	x	6.25	6.30	6.70	6.70	8	
2nd place, silver medalist(s)	Yargelis Savigne	Cuba	Americas	6.28	6.50	6.31	6.63	6.63	7	
3rd place, bronze medalist(s)	Olga Rypakova	Kazakhstan	Asia-Pacific	6.60	x	6.53	x	6.60	6	SB
4	Ineta Radēviča	Latvia	Europe	6.30	6.44	6.37	6.55	6.55	5	
5	Naide Gomes	Portugal	Europe	6.52	x	4.94	6.32	6.52	4	
6	Blessing Okagbare	Nigeria	Africa	6.13	x	6.32	6.34	6.34	3	
7	Brianna Glenn	United States	Americas	x	6.22	6.28	6.18	6.28	2	
8	Jamaa Chnaik	Morocco	Africa	5.53	5.78	5.66	5.67	5.78	1	

==== Women's triple jump ====
Rank	Athlete	Nationality	Team	#1	#2	#3	#4	Result	Points	Notes
1st place, gold medalist(s)	Olga Rypakova	Kazakhstan	Asia-Pacific	15.25	14.40	x	x	15.25	8	CR
2nd place, silver medalist(s)	Olha Saladukha	Ukraine	Europe	14.40	x	14.70	14.54	14.70	7	
3rd place, bronze medalist(s)	Yargelis Savigne	Cuba	Americas	14.61	x	14.63	x	14.63	6	
4	Xie Limei	China	Asia-Pacific	14.12	14.35	14.23	x	14.35	5	SB
5	Simona La Mantia	Italy	Europe	14.12	x	14.05	x	14.12	4	
6	Sarah Nambawa	Uganda	Africa	13.51	13.42	13.78	x	13.78	3	
7	Nkiru Domike	Nigeria	Africa	12.82	x	13.69	x	13.69	2	
8	Erica McLain	United States	Americas	12.67	13.62	13.57	13.28	13.62	1	

==== Women's shot put ====
Rank	Athlete	Nationality	Team	#1	#2	#3	#4	Result	Points	Notes
1st place, gold medalist(s)	Valerie Adams	New Zealand	Asia-Pacific	20.70	20.86	20.76	20.56	20.86	8	SB
2nd place, silver medalist(s)	Nadzeya Astapchuk	Belarus	Europe	19.75	20.13	20.18	x	20.18	7	
3rd place, bronze medalist(s)	Gong Lijiao	China	Asia-Pacific	19.24	20.13	20.13	x	20.13	6	SB
4	Misleydis González	Cuba	Americas	18.14	18.54	18.62	18.15	18.62	5	
5	Jillian Camarena-Williams	United States	Americas	17.23	18.49	18.22	18.46	18.49	4	
6	Olga Ivanova	Russia	Europe	18.02	18.24	x	18.04	18.24	3	
7	Mariam Nnodu-Ibekwe	Nigeria	Africa	12.63	13.67	13.45	x	13.67	2	SB
8	Priscilla Isiao	Kenya	Africa	12.17	12.55	12.17	13.04	13.04	1	

==== Women's discus throw ====
Rank	Athlete	Nationality	Team	#1	#2	#3	#4	Result	Points	Notes
1st place, gold medalist(s)	Li Yanfeng	China	Asia-Pacific	61.57	61.29	63.79	x	63.79	8	
2nd place, silver medalist(s)	Sandra Perković	Croatia	Europe	62.30	60.70	63.29	59.80	63.29	7	
3rd place, bronze medalist(s)	Yarelis Barrios	Cuba	Americas	58.77	61.90	62.58	62.27	62.58	6	
4	Dani Samuels	Australia	Asia-Pacific	x	61.34	x	x	61.34	5	
5	Becky Breisch	United States	Americas	60.61	x	59.90	60.70	60.70	4	
6	Nicoleta Grasu	Romania	Europe	58.57	58.56	59.02	59.69	59.69	3	
7	Elizna Naudé	South Africa	Africa	x	53.41	55.79	x	55.79	2	
8	Kazai Suzanne Kragbé	Ivory Coast	Africa	49.29	52.27	x	x	52.27	1	

==== Women's hammer throw ====
Rank	Athlete	Nationality	Team	#1	#2	#3	#4	Result	Points	Notes
1st place, gold medalist(s)	Tatyana Lysenko	Russia	Europe	72.64	x	73.18	73.88	73.88	8	
2nd place, silver medalist(s)	Zhang Wenxiu	China	Asia-Pacific	73.69	x	70.46	72.71	73.69	7	
3rd place, bronze medalist(s)	Yipsi Moreno	Cuba	Americas	x	x	70.21	72.73	72.73	6	
4	Betty Heidler	Germany	Europe	70.38	x	72.70	x	72.70	5	
5	Jennifer Dahlgren	Argentina	Americas	63.73	64.96	66.25	x	66.25	4	
6	Gabrielle Neighbour	Australia	Asia-Pacific	61.15	60.15	60.80	63.07	63.07	3	
DSQ	Marwa Hussein	Egypt	Africa	61.07	61.87	x	61.64	61.87	0	

==== Women's javelin throw ====
Rank	Athlete	Nationality	Team	#1	#2	#3	#4	Result	Points	Notes
1st place, gold medalist(s)	Sunette Viljoen	South Africa	Africa	60.48	62.21	59.98	60.07	62.21	8	
2nd place, silver medalist(s)	Kimberley Mickle	Australia	Asia-Pacific	x	61.36	x	x	61.36	7	SB
3rd place, bronze medalist(s)	Linda Stahl	Germany	Europe	57.06	60.37	55.79	59.74	60.37	6	
4	Hana'a Ramadhan Omar	Egypt	Africa	51.33	55.00	58.16	56.30	58.16	5	NR
5	Kara Patterson	United States	Americas	56.35	58.07	x	55.97	58.07	4	
6	Yainelis Ribeaux	Cuba	Americas	53.22	57.08	55.09	54.24	57.08	3	
DSQ	Mariya Abakumova	Russia	Europe	65.28	68.14	62.49	61.90	68.14	0	
