= Athletics at the 2010 Asian Games – Women's 4 × 100 metres relay =

Women's 4 × 100 metres relay at the 2010 Asian Games
- Venue: Aoti Main Stadium
- Dates: 23–26 November 2010
- Competitors: 42 from 10 nations

Medalists
gold medal	Thailand; Phatsorn Jaksuninkorn, Neeranuch Klomdee, Laphassaporn Tawoncharoen, Nongnuch Sanrat
silver medal	China; Tao Yujia, Liang Qiuping, Jiang Lan, Ye Jiabei
bronze medal	Japan; Mayumi Watanabe, Momoko Takahashi, Yumeka Sano, Chisato Fukushima

The women's 4 × 100 metres relay event at the 2010 Asian Games was held at the Aoti Main Stadium, Guangzhou, China on 23–26 November.

== Schedule ==
All times are China Standard Time (UTC+08:00)

Date	Time	Event
Tuesday, 23 November 2010	18:10	Round 1
Friday, 26 November 2010	17:45	Final

== Records ==
Prior to this competition, the existing world, Asian and Games records were as follows.

World Record	East Germany	41.37	Canberra, Australia	6 October 1985
Asian Record	China	42.23	Shanghai, China	23 October 1997
Games Record	China	43.36	Bangkok, Thailand	15 December 1998

== Results ==
Legend

- DNF — Did not finish

=== Round 1 ===
- Qualification: First 3 in each heat (Q) and the next 2 fastest (q) advance to the final.

==== Heat 1 ====
Rank	Team	Time	Notes
1	Thailand (THA); Phatsorn Jaksuninkorn; Neeranuch Klomdee; Laphassaporn Tawoncharoen; Nongnuch Sanrat	44.42	Q
2	Vietnam (VIE); Lê Thị Mộng Tuyền; Lê Ngọc Phượng; Nguyễn Thị Ngọc Thắm; Vũ Thị Hương	45.12	Q
3	India (IND); Sathi Geetha; Srabani Nanda; P. K. Priya; H. M. Jyothi	45.44	Q
4	Hong Kong (HKG); Chan Ho Yee; Leung Hau Sze; Wan Kin Yee; Lam On Ki	47.23	q
—	Kazakhstan (KAZ); Viktoriya Zyabkina; Olga Bludova; Anastassiya Soprunova; Natalya Ivoninskaya	DNF	

==== Heat 2 ====
Rank	Team	Time	Notes
1	Japan (JPN); Mayumi Watanabe; Momoko Takahashi; Yumeka Sano; Asuka Terada	44.73	Q
2	China (CHN); Tao Yujia; Liang Qiuping; Jiang Lan; Ye Jiabei	44.78	Q
3	Sri Lanka (SRI); Yamuna Niranjala; Jani Chathurangani; Sujani Buddika; Chandrika Subashini	45.49	Q
4	Malaysia (MAS); Yee Yi Leng; Nurul Sarah Kadir; Norjannah Hafiszah Jamaludin; Siti Zubaidah Adabi	45.50	q
5	Iraq (IRQ); Alaa Hikmat; Dana Hussein; Inam Khazaal; Gulustan Mahmood	47.46	

=== Final ===
Rank	Team	Time	Notes
1st place, gold medalist(s)	Thailand (THA); Phatsorn Jaksuninkorn; Neeranuch Klomdee; Laphassaporn Tawoncharoen; Nongnuch Sanrat	44.09	
2nd place, silver medalist(s)	China (CHN); Tao Yujia; Liang Qiuping; Jiang Lan; Ye Jiabei	44.22	
3rd place, bronze medalist(s)	Japan (JPN); Mayumi Watanabe; Momoko Takahashi; Yumeka Sano; Chisato Fukushima	44.41	
4	Vietnam (VIE); Lê Thị Mộng Tuyền; Lê Ngọc Phượng; Nguyễn Thị Ngọc Thắm; Vũ Thị Hương	44.77	
5	India (IND); Sathi Geetha; Srabani Nanda; P. K. Priya; H. M. Jyothi	45.23	
6	Malaysia (MAS); Yee Yi Leng; Nurul Sarah Kadir; Norjannah Hafiszah Jamaludin; Siti Zubaidah Adabi	45.54	
7	Hong Kong (HKG); Chan Ho Yee; Leung Hau Sze; Hui Man Ling; Lam On Ki	46.40	
—	Sri Lanka (SRI); Yamuna Niranjala; Jani Chathurangani; Sujani Buddika; Chandrika Subashini	DNF	
