= 2009 Asian Athletics Championships – Men's 100 metres =

The men's 100 metres event at the 2009 Asian Athletics Championships was held at the Guangdong Olympic Stadium on November 10–11.

== Medalists ==
| Gold | Silver | Bronze |
|---|---|---|
| Zhang Peimeng; China | Naoki Tsukahara; Japan | Guo Fan; China |

== Results ==
=== Heats ===
Wind: Heat 1: -1.0 m/s, Heat 2: -1.1 m/s, Heat 3: -0.8 m/s, Heat 4: -0.5 m/s

| Rank | Heat | Name | Nationality | Time | Notes |
|---|---|---|---|---|---|
| 1 | 3 | Barakat Al-Harthi | Oman | 10.51 | Q |
| 1 | 2 | Naoki Tsukahara | Japan | 10.51 | Q |
| 3 | 3 | Sathya Suresh | India | 10.55 | Q, PB |
| 4 | 3 | Zhang Peimeng | China | 10.55 | Q |
| 5 | 3 | Suryo Agung Wibowo | Indonesia | 10.56 | Q |
| 6 | 4 | Shehan Ambepitiya | Sri Lanka | 10.59 | Q |
| 7 | 2 | Guo Fan | China | 10.60 | Q |
| 7 | 4 | Lim Hee-nam | South Korea | 10.60 | Q |
| 9 | 4 | Abdul Najeeb Qureshi | India | 10.60 | Q |
| 10 | 1 | Lai Chun Ho | Hong Kong | 10.62 | Q |
| 11 | 1 | Mohamed Farhane | Bahrain | 10.63 | Q |
| 11 | 2 | Yahya Habeeb | Saudi Arabia | 10.63 | Q |
| 13 | 4 | Yasir Baalghayth Al-Nashri | Saudi Arabia | 10.65 | q, F1 |
| 14 | 4 | Yi Wei-che | Chinese Taipei | 10.68 | q |
| 15 | 2 | Mohamed Sanad Al-Rashedi | Bahrain | 10.71 | q |
| 16 | 1 | Mohammad Noor Imran A Hadi | Malaysia | 10.72 | Q |
| 17 | 4 | Wattana Deewong | Thailand | 10.75 | |
| 18 | 1 | Tu Chia-lin | Chinese Taipei | 10.80 | |
| 18 | 3 | Muhammad Idris Zakaria | Malaysia | 10.80 | |
| 20 | 1 | Kim Kook-young | South Korea | 10.81 | |
| 21 | 1 | Masashi Eriguchi | Japan | 10.82 | |
| 22 | 3 | Poh Seng Song | Singapore | 10.85 | |
| 23 | 1 | Mohd Fadlin | Indonesia | 10.86 | |
| 24 | 2 | Tsui Chi Ho | Hong Kong | 10.87 | |
| 25 | 1 | Muhd Amirudin Bin Jamal | Singapore | 10.88 | |
| 26 | 4 | Fahad Al-Jabri | Oman | 10.89 | |
| 27 | 3 | Battulgyn Achitbileg | Mongolia | 11.09 | |
| 28 | 2 | Weerasuriya Mudiyanselage | Sri Lanka | 11.12 | |
| 29 | 4 | Hussain Haleem | Maldives | 11.25 | |
| 30 | 3 | Wachara Sondee | Thailand | 11.33 | |
| 31 | 2 | Tilak Ram Tharu | Nepal | 11.52 | |
| 32 | 2 | Ao Chan Hong | Macau | 11.60 | |

=== Semifinals ===
Wind: Heat 1: -0.6 m/s, Heat 2: -1.1 m/s

| Rank | Heat | Name | Nationality | Time | Notes |
|---|---|---|---|---|---|
| 1 | 1 | Naoki Tsukahara | Japan | 10.37 | Q |
| 2 | 1 | Guo Fan | China | 10.47 | Q |
| 2 | 2 | Zhang Peimeng | China | 10.47 | Q |
| 4 | 2 | Suryo Agung Wibowo | Indonesia | 10.51 | Q |
| 5 | 1 | Shehan Ambepitiya | Sri Lanka | 10.54 | Q |
| 6 | 2 | Barakat Al-Harthi | Oman | 10.55 | Q |
| 7 | 1 | Abdul Najeeb Qureshi | India | 10.62 | q |
| 8 | 2 | Sathya Suresh | India | 10.63 | q |
| 9 | 2 | Lai Chun Ho | Hong Kong | 10.63 | |
| 10 | 1 | Yahya Habeeb | Saudi Arabia | 10.65 | |
| 11 | 1 | Lim Hee-nam | South Korea | 10.69 | |
| 12 | 2 | Mohammad Noor Imran A Hadi | Malaysia | 10.76 | |
| 13 | 1 | Yi Wei-che | Chinese Taipei | 10.77 | |
| 14 | 1 | Mohamed Sanad Al-Rashedi | Bahrain | 10.83 | |
| 15 | 2 | Yasir Baalghayth Al-Nashri | Saudi Arabia | 10.84 | F1 |
| 16 | 2 | Mohamed Farhane | Bahrain | 11.61 | |

=== Final ===
Wind: -0.1 m/s

| Rank | Lane | Name | Nationality | Time | Notes |
|---|---|---|---|---|---|
| 1st place, gold medalist(s) | 3 | Zhang Peimeng | China | 10.28 | F1 |
| 2nd place, silver medalist(s) | 4 | Naoki Tsukahara | Japan | 10.32 | |
| 3rd place, bronze medalist(s) | 5 | Guo Fan | China | 10.37 | |
| 4 | 6 | Suryo Agung Wibowo | Indonesia | 10.41 | |
| 5 | 7 | Barakat Al-Harthi | Oman | 10.45 | |
| 6 | 8 | Shehan Ambepitiya | Sri Lanka | 10.49 | |
| 7 | 1 | Sathya Suresh | India | 10.62 | |
| 8 | 2 | Abdul Najeeb Qureshi | India | 10.63 | F1 |
