= Guo Fan =

Guo Fan may refer to:

- Frant Gwo or Guo Fan (郭帆; born 1980), Chinese film director. His most well known film production is "the Wandering Earth" (released in 2019), and its sequel "the Wandering Earth II" (released in 2022).
- Guo Fan (athlete) (郭凡; born 1985), Chinese athlete
