= P. K. Priya =

Indian athlete

Personal information
- Full name: Premachandram Kanchana Priya
- Born: 29 April 1988 (age 38)

Sport
- Country: India
- Sport: Track and field
- Event: 100 metres
Medal record
Women's athletics
Representing India
Commonwealth Games
| Bronze medal – third place | 2010 Delhi | 4 x 100 m relay |

Premachandram Kanchana Priya (born 29 April 1988), known as P. K. Priya, is an athlete from India. At the 2010 Commonwealth Games in Delhi, she was a member of the women's 4 × 100 m relay which won a bronze medal with Geetha Satti, Srabani Nanda and H. M. Jyothi. At the 2010 Asian Games in Guangzhou, she was a member of the women's 4 × 100 m relay which finished in 5th place. At the 2009 Asian Athletics Championships in Guangzhou, she was a member of the women's 4 × 100 m relay.

Personal bests:
| Event | Result | Date |
|---|---|---|
| 4 × 100 metres relay | 45.23 | 26 November 2010 |
| Long jump | 6.12 | 16 June 2006 |
| 100 metres | 11.97 | 5 June 2010 |

== See also ==
- India at the 2010 Asian Games
- India at the 2010 Commonwealth Games
