= 2009 Asian Athletics Championships – Men's 4 × 100 metres relay =

The men's 4 × 100 metres relay event at the 2009 Asian Athletics Championships was held at the Guangdong Olympic Stadium on November 12–14.

== Medalists ==
Gold	Silver	Bronze
Japan; Masashi Eriguchi; Naoki Tsukahara; Shinji Takahira; Kenji Fujimitsu	China; Guo Fan; Liang Jiahong; Su Bingtian; Zhang Peimeng	Chinese Taipei; Tu Chia-lin; Liu Yuan-kai; Tsai Meng-lin; Yi Wei-che

== Results ==
=== Heats ===
Rank	Heat	Nation	Athletes	Time	Notes
1	1	Japan	Masashi Eriguchi, Naoki Tsukahara, Shinji Takahira, Kenji Fujimitsu	39.24	Q
2	1	China	Guo Fan, Liang Jiahong, Su Bingtian, Zhang Peimeng	39.27	Q
3	1	Chinese Taipei	Tu Chia-lin, Liu Yuan-kai, Tsai Meng-lin, Yi Wei-che	39.82	Q
4	2	Thailand	Narakorn Chaiprasert, Wachara Sondee, Sompote Suwannarangsri, Wattana Deewong	39.99	Q
5	2	India	Nagaraj Bharmappa Gobbaragumpi, Sathya Suresh, Sameer Mon, Ritesh Anand	40.01	Q
6	2	South Korea	Kim Kook-young, Jeon Deok-hyung, Yeo Hosu-ah, Lim Hee-nam	40.03	Q
7	1	Oman	Fahad Al-Jabri, Juma Al-Jabri, Abdullah Al-Sooli, Barakat Al-Harthi	40.29	q
8	1	Hong Kong	Yip Siukeung, Tsui Chi Ho, Wong Ka Chun, Lai Chun Ho	40.33	q
	1	Saudi Arabia	Yahya Hassan Habeeb, Mohammed Al-Fardan, Yasir Al-Nashri, Yahya Saeed Al-Gahes	DQ	
	2	Indonesia	Mohd Fadlin, Suryo Agung Wibowo, Apip Dwi Cahyono, Riski Latip	DNF	
	1	Singapore	Yeo Foo Ee Gary, Bin Mustapha Muhd Elfi, Bin Jamal Muhd Amirudin, Poh Seng Song	DNF	
	2	United Arab Emirates		DNS	

=== Final ===
Rank	Lane	Team	Name	Time	Notes
1st place, gold medalist(s)	3	Japan	Masashi Eriguchi, Naoki Tsukahara, Shinji Takahira, Kenji Fujimitsu	39.01	
2nd place, silver medalist(s)	5	China	Guo Fan, Liang Jiahong, Su Bingtian, Zhang Peimeng	39.07	
3rd place, bronze medalist(s)	7	Chinese Taipei	Tu Chia-lin, Liu Yuan-kai, Tsai Meng-lin, Yi Wei-che	39.57	
4	4	Thailand	Sompote Suwannarangsri, Wachara Sondee, Suppachai Chimdee, Sittichai Suwonprateep	39.57	
5	6	India	Nagaraj Bharmappa Gobbaragumpi, Sathya Suresh, Sameer Mon, Abdul Najeeb Qureshi	39.58	
6	8	South Korea	Kim Kook-young, Jeon Deok-hyung, Yeo Hosu-ah, Lim Hee-nam	39.86	
7	2	Hong Kong	Tang Yik Chun, Tsui Chi Ho, Wong Ka Chun, Lai Chun Ho	40.22	
8	1	Oman	Fahad Al-Jabri, Juma Al-Jabri, Abdullah Al-Sooli, Barakat Al-Harthi	40.37	
