= Yumeka Sano =

Japanese sprinter

Personal information
- Nationality: Japan
- Born: 1 June 1985 (age 41) Masuho, Yamanashi, Japan
- Education: Tsuru University
- Height: 1.60 m (5 ft 3 in)
- Weight: 54 kg (119 lb)

Sport
- Sport: Track and field
- Event: 100 metres
- Personal best(s): 100 m: 11.59 (Hiroshima 2010)
Medal record
Women's athletics
Representing Japan
Asian Games
Bronze medal – third place	2010 Guangzhou	4×100 m relay

Yumeka Sano 佐野夢加 (born 1 June 1985 in Masuho, Yamanashi) is a retired Japanese sprinter. She competed for the Japanese team in the 4 × 100 metres relay at the 2012 Summer Olympics; the team placed 15th with a time of 44.25 in Round 1 and did not qualify for the final.

== Personal best ==
Event	Time (s)	Competition	Venue	Date	Notes
100 m	11.59 (wind: +1.7 m/s)	Mikio Oda Memorial	Hiroshima, Japan	29 April 2010	
100 m	11.50 (wind: +2.6 m/s)	Mikio Oda Memorial	Hiroshima, Japan	29 April 2010	Wind-assisted

== International competition ==
Year	Competition	Venue	Position	Event	Time	Notes
Representing Japan and Asia-Pacific (Continental Cup only)
2010	Continental Cup	Split, Croatia	4th	4×100 m relay	44.54 (relay leg: 3rd)	
2010	Asian Games	Guangzhou, China	3rd	4×100 m relay	44.41 (relay leg: 3rd)	SB
2012	Olympic Games	London, United Kingdom	14th (h)	4×100 m relay	44.25 (relay leg: 4th)	
