= Athletics at the 2009 Summer Universiade – Women's 100 metres =

The women's 100 metres event at the 2009 Summer Universiade was held on 7–8 July.

== Medalists ==
Gold	Silver	Bronze
Lina Grinčikaitė; Lithuania	Momoko Takahashi; Japan	Sonia Tavares; Portugal

== Results ==
=== Heats ===
Qualification: First 3 of each heat (Q) and the next 6 fastest (q) qualified for the semifinals.

Wind:
Heat 1: -0.9 m/s, Heat 2: +0.4 m/s, Heat 3: +0.8 m/s, Heat 4: -1.7 m/s, Heat 5: +0.8 m/s, Heat 6: -0.9 m/s

Rank	Heat	Name	Nationality	Time	Notes
1	5	Lina Grinčikaitė	Lithuania	11.49	Q, SB
2	3	Sonia Tavares	Portugal	11.52	Q
3	1	Melissa Breen	Australia	11.53	Q
4	6	Momoko Takahashi	Japan	11.58	Q
5	6	Tina Murn	Slovenia	11.58	Q
6	5	Ayodelé Ikuesan	France	11.60	Q
7	6	Maria Aurora Salvagno	Italy	11.63	Q
8	2	Iwona Brzezińska	Poland	11.66	Q
9	1	Sangwan Jaksunin	Thailand	11.73	Q, SB
10	2	Jelena Subotić	Serbia	11.74	Q
11	2	Tao Yujia	China	11.75	Q
11	5	Audrey Alloh	Italy	11.75	Q
13	3	Silva Pesackaitė	Lithuania	11.77	Q, PB
14	2	Zsófia Rozsa	Hungary	11.81	q
15	6	Maja Golub	Croatia	11.83	q
16	5	Pia Tajnikar	Slovenia	11.86	q
17	4	Tatjana Mitić	Serbia	11.87	Q
18	4	Jody Henry	Australia	11.87	Q
19	3	Andrea Koenen	New Zealand	11.88	Q, PB
20	5	Nongnuch Sanrat	Thailand	11.90	q
21	1	Edina Pal	Hungary	11.94	Q
22	2	Mildred Gamba	Uganda	11.95	q
22	3	Ekaterina Tatarintseva	Russia	11.95	q
24	1	Anna Animah Yeboah	Ghana	12.01	PB
25	2	Thandiwe Vilakazi	South Africa	12.04	
26	2	Irina Kasatkina	Russia	12.16	
26	4	Cindy Stewart	South Africa	12.16	Q
28	3	Ivana Rožman	Macedonia	12.20	
29	1	Lorène Bazolo	Republic of the Congo	12.23	
30	1	Tang Uen Shan	Hong Kong	12.27	PB
31	3	Millisand de la Paz	Netherlands Antilles	12.29	
32	4	Leng Mei	China	12.30	
33	4	Lin Yi-chun	Chinese Taipei	12.31	
34	1	Arta Sadrija	Albania	12.70	
35	3	Madiha Latif	Pakistan	12.74	
36	5	Sarita Morales	Costa Rica	12.96	
37	4	Hawwa Haneefa	Maldives	13.65	
38	1	Keikanyemang Ngande	Botswana	13.69	PB
39	3	Dao Thi Ha	Vietnam	13.72	
40	6	Inonge Ilubala	Zambia	15.39	
	4	Lucienne M'Belu	France	DNF	
	2	Helen Emedolu	Nigeria	DNS	
	4	Seun Adigun	Nigeria	DNS	
	5	Henriette Lungoy Namwisi	Democratic Republic of the Congo	DNS	
	6	Rima Alomari	Jordan	DNS	
	6	Marie-Josée Lukaku	Democratic Republic of the Congo	DNS	

=== Semifinals ===
Qualification: First 2 of each semifinal (Q) and the next 2 fastest (q) qualified for the finals.

Wind:
Heat 1: +0.2 m/s, Heat 2: +0.4 m/s, Heat 3: +0.5 m/s

Rank	Heat	Name	Nationality	Time	Notes
1	2	Lina Grinčikaitė	Lithuania	11.37	Q, SB
2	2	Tina Murn	Slovenia	11.52	Q
3	2	Maria Aurora Salvagno	Italy	11.57	q
3	3	Sonia Tavares	Portugal	11.57	Q
5	3	Iwona Brzezińska	Poland	11.59	Q, PB
6	3	Ayodelé Ikuesan	France	11.61	q
7	1	Momoko Takahashi	Japan	11.62	Q
8	1	Melissa Breen	Australia	11.65	Q
9	2	Tatjana Mitić	Serbia	11.72	
10	1	Tao Yujia	China	11.76	
11	1	Maja Golub	Croatia	11.77	
12	3	Silva Pesackaitė	Lithuania	11.80	
13	3	Audrey Alloh	Italy	11.82	
14	1	Sangwan Jaksunin	Thailand	11.83	
14	2	Jody Henry	Australia	11.83	
14	2	Zsófia Rozsa	Hungary	11.83	
17	1	Pia Tajnikar	Slovenia	11.86	
18	3	Edina Pal	Hungary	11.87	
19	1	Jelena Subotić	Serbia	12.04	
20	3	Mildred Gamba	Uganda	12.05	
21	3	Nongnuch Sanrat	Thailand	12.07	
22	2	Ekaterina Tatarintseva	Russia	12.08	
23	1	Andrea Koenen	New Zealand	12.09	
24	2	Cindy Stewart	South Africa	12.11	

=== Final ===
Wind: -0.3 m/s

Rank	Lane	Name	Nationality	Time	Notes
1st place, gold medalist(s)	4	Lina Grinčikaitė	Lithuania	11.31	PB
2nd place, silver medalist(s)	6	Momoko Takahashi	Japan	11.52	PB
3rd place, bronze medalist(s)	3	Sonia Tavares	Portugal	11.54	
4	2	Maria Aurora Salvagno	Italy	11.55	
5	5	Tina Murn	Slovenia	11.57	
6	7	Iwona Brzezińska	Poland	11.70	
7	1	Ayodelé Ikuesan	France	11.70	
8	8	Melissa Breen	Australia	11.72	
