= Lao Yi =

Chinese sprinter

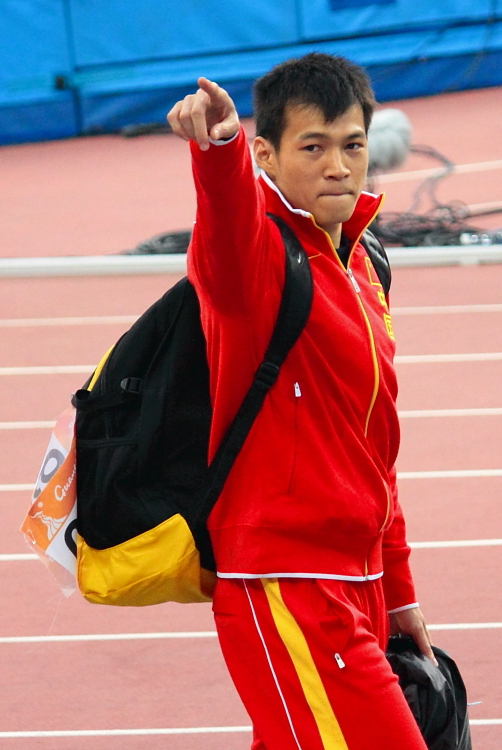
Lao at the 2010 Asian Games in Guangzhou

Lao Yi (Chinese: 劳义) (born October 10, 1985 in Hepu County, Beihai City, Guangxi) is a Chinese track and field athlete who specialises in sprinting. He made his international debut at the 2010 IAAF Continental Cup, where he finished sixth in the 100 metres, representing Asia.

He was the surprise winner of the 100 m gold medal at 2010 Asian Games with a time of 10.24 seconds. The race favourites were eliminated in qualifying and his win in the final made him the first Chinese athlete to take the 100 m title in Asian Games history. He then anchored the Chinese 4×100 metres relay team to a second gold medal, recording a time of 38.78 seconds to break the Asian Games record as well as the Chinese national record for the event, running alongside Lu Bin, Liang Jiahong and Su Bintian.

He is of Hakka descent and he is hailing from Hepu County.
