= 2009 Asian Athletics Championships – Women's 200 metres =

The women's 200 metres event at the 2009 Asian Athletics Championships was held at the Guangdong Olympic Stadium on November 12–13.

== Medalists ==
Gold	Silver	Bronze
Momoko Takahashi; Japan	Vu Thi Huong; Vietnam	Jiang Lan; China

== Results ==
=== Heats ===
Wind:
Heat 1: -0.6 m/s, Heat 2: +2.5 m/s, Heat 3: +0.5 m/s, Heat 4: +1.8 m/s

Rank	Heat	Name	Nationality	Time	Notes
1	3	Jiang Lan	China	24.19	Q
2	2	Kim Ha-na	South Korea	24.21	Q
3	4	Vu Thi Huong	Vietnam	24.27	Q
4	3	Chandrika Subashini Rasnayake	Sri Lanka	24.32	Q
5	1	Lai Weijie	China	24.37	Q
6	3	Kim Cho-rong	South Korea	24.40	Q
7	1	Le Ngoc Phuong	Vietnam	24.43	Q, PB
8	1	Momoko Takahashi	Japan	24.43	Q
9	2	Lidiya Shahvorostova	Uzbekistan	24.61	Q
9	4	Munira Saleh	Syria	24.61	Q
11	4	Pemila Priyadharshani Delapalage	Sri Lanka	24.72	Q
12	2	Anna Gavriushenko	Kazakhstan	24.78	Q
13	3	Tassaporn Wannakit	Thailand	24.83	q
14	2	Norjannanh Hafiszah Jamaludin	Malaysia	24.90	q
15	1	Nurul Sarah Abdul Kadir	Malaysia	25.08	q
16	1	Esso Gulstan	Iraq	25.14	q
17	4	Sowjanya Karnatapu	India	25.21	
18	3	Tang Uen Shan	Hong Kong	25.52	
19	3	Chen Shu-chuan	Chinese Taipei	25.53	
20	4	Dana Al-Khafaji	Iraq	25.66	
21	2	Faten Abdulnabi	Bahrain	25.87	
22	4	Yelena Ryabova	Turkmenistan	26.08	
23	3	Badmaa Batchyy	Mongolia	26.96	
24	4	Pramila Rijal	Nepal	27.35	
25	1	Io In Chi	Macau	27.53	
	2	Liao Ching-hsien	Chinese Taipei	DQ	F1, F2
	4	Guzel Khubbieva	Uzbekistan	DNS	
	1	Maryam Tousi	Iran	DNS	
	2	Maki Wada	Japan	DNS	

=== Semifinal ===
Wind: Heat 1: -0.5 m/s, Heat 2: 0.0 m/s

Rank	Heat	Name	Nationality	Time	Notes
1	2	Momoko Takahashi	Japan	23.75	Q
2	2	Vu Thi Huong	Vietnam	23.79	Q
3	2	Jiang Lan	China	23.80	Q
4	1	Munira Saleh	Syria	24.07	Q, PB
5	1	Lai Weijie	China	24.15	Q
6	1	Chandrika Subashini Rasnayake	Sri Lanka	24.20	Q
7	1	Kim Cho-rong	South Korea	24.25	q, PB
8	1	Le Ngoc Phuong	Vietnam	24.28	q, PB
9	2	Kim Ha-na	South Korea	24.55	
10	2	Tassaporn Wannakit	Thailand	24.70	
11	1	Nurul Sarah Abdul Kadir	Malaysia	24.84	
12	1	Anna Gavriushenko	Kazakhstan	24.96	
13	2	Lidiya Shahvorostova	Uzbekistan	24.98	
14	1	Esso Gulstan	Iraq	25.22	
15	2	Norjannanh Hafiszah Jamaludin	Malaysia	25.34	
	2	Pemila Priyadharshani Delapalage	Sri Lanka	DNF	

=== Final ===
Wind: +0.9 m/s

Rank	Lane	Name	Nationality	Time	Notes
1st place, gold medalist(s)	5	Momoko Takahashi	Japan	23.53	
2nd place, silver medalist(s)	6	Vu Thi Huong	Vietnam	23.61	SB
3rd place, bronze medalist(s)	7	Jiang Lan	China	23.65	
4	3	Munira Saleh	Syria	23.87	PB
5	4	Lai Weijie	China	24.08	
6	8	Chandrika Subashini Rasnayake	Sri Lanka	24.21	
7	1	Le Ngoc Phuong	Vietnam	24.33	
8	2	Kim Cho-rong	South Korea	24.37	
