= Maki Wada =

Japanese sprinter

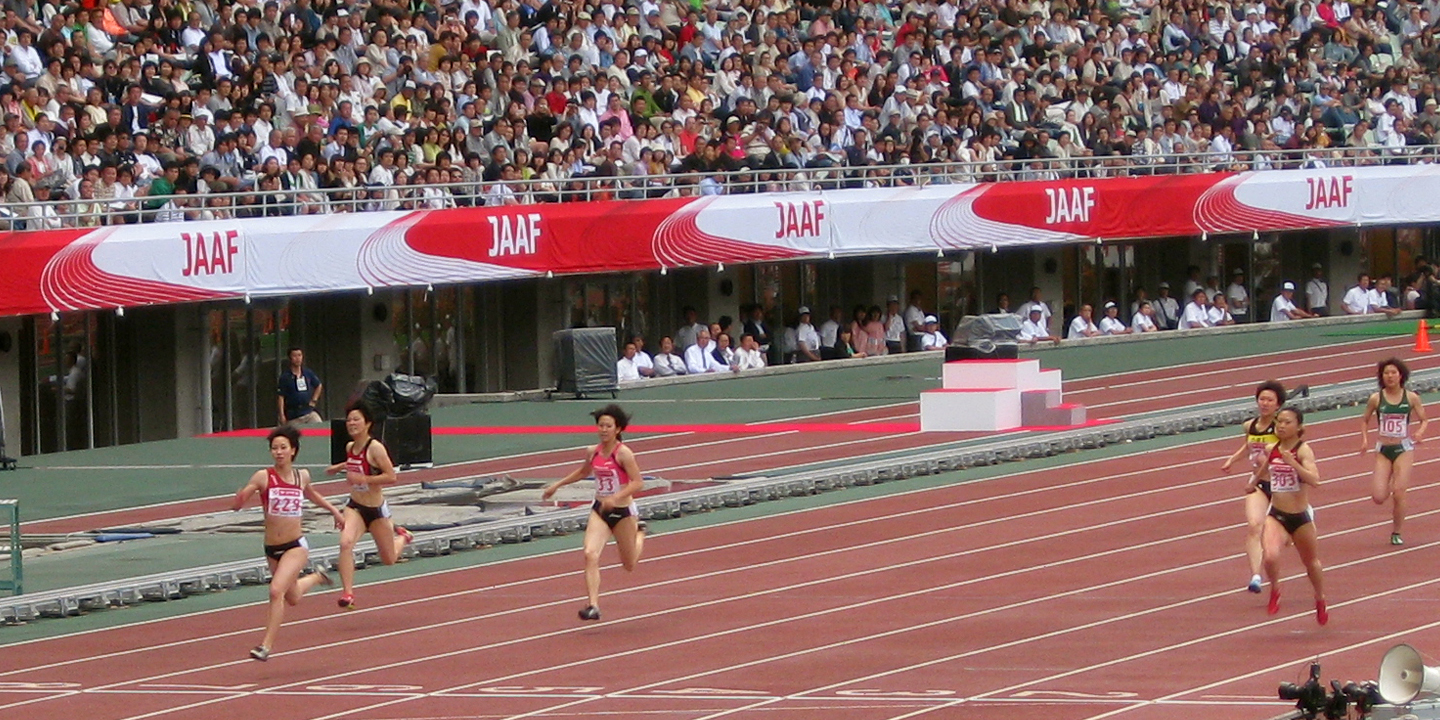
- Wada (No.303) at the 2012 Japanese Championships

Personal information
- Nationality: Japan
- Born: 18 November 1986 (age 39) Kyoto Prefecture, Japan
- Education: Ryukoku University
- Height: 1.64 m (5 ft 5 in)
- Weight: 52 kg (115 lb)

Sport
- Sport: Track and field
- Events: 100 metres 200 metres 4×100 metres relay
- Club: Mizuno Track Club

Achievements and titles
- Personal bests: 100 m: 11.53 (2018); 200 m: 23.67 (2007)
Medal record
Women's athletics
Representing Japan
Asian Championships
Gold medal – first place	2009 Guangzhou	4×100 m relay
East Asian Games
Silver medal – second place	2009 Hong Kong	4×100 m relay
Bronze medal – third place	2009 Hong Kong	100 m

Maki Wada (和田 麻希, Wada Maki; born 18 November 1986 in kyoto Prefecture) is a Japanese track and field sprinter. She competed in the 4 × 100 meters relay at the 2009 World Championships and did not qualify for the final.

She married her coach Akinori Minato in August 2020.

== Personal bests ==
Event	Time (s)	Competition	Venue	Date	Notes
100 m	11.53 (wind: +0.8 m/s)	Sumitomo Electric Cup	Itami, Japan	21 October 2018	
100 m	11.45 (wind: +2.8 m/s)	National Sports Festival	Akita, Japan	6 October 2007	Wind-assisted
200 m	23.67 (wind: +1.3 m/s)	National University Championship	Hiratsuka, Japan	9 September 2007	

== International competitions ==
Year	Competition	Venue	Position	Event	Time (s)
Representing Japan and Asia-Pacific (Continental Cup only)
2009	World Championships	Berlin, Germany	14th (h)	4×100 m relay	44.24 (relay leg: 4th)
2009	Asian Championships	Guangzhou, China	— (h)	200 m	DNS
2009	Asian Championships	Guangzhou, China	1st	4×100 m relay	43.93 (relay leg: 1st)
2009	East Asian Games	Hong Kong, China	3rd	100 m	12.06 (wind: -1.2 m/s)
2009	East Asian Games	Hong Kong, China	2nd	4×100 m relay	44.89 (relay leg: 4th)
2010	Continental Cup	Split, Croatia	4th	4×100 m relay	44.54 (relay leg: 1st)

== National title ==
- National Corporate Championships
  - 200 m: 2018

== Circuit win ==
- National Grand Prix Series (200 m)
  - Overall winner: 2019
