= Wen Yongyi =

Chinese sprinter

Wen Yongyi (born 3 January 1987 in Liuzhou, Guangxi) is a Chinese sprinter who specializes in the 100 metres. His personal best time is 10.28 seconds, achieved in July 2007 in Guangzhou.

He won a bronze medal in the 4 × 100 metres relay at the 2006 Asian Games. He also competed at the 2006 IAAF World Indoor Championships without reaching the final.

Wen represented China at the 2008 Summer Olympics in Beijing. He competed at the 4 × 100 metres relay together with Hu Kai, Zhang Peimeng and Lu Bin. In their qualification heat they placed fourth behind Jamaica, Canada and Germany. Their time of 39.13 was the eighth fastest out of sixteen participating nations in the first round and they qualified for the final. There they were however disqualified and placed at the eighth position.

He won the relay gold medal at the 11th Chinese National Games in 2009 with Liang Jiahong.
