= Athletics at the 2010 Commonwealth Games – Women's 4 × 100 metres relay =

Women's 4 × 100 metres relay at the Commonwealth Games

The Women's 4 × 100 metres relay at the 2010 Commonwealth Games as part of the athletics programme was held at the Jawaharlal Nehru Stadium on Tuesday 12 October 2010.

== Records ==
World Record	41.37	East Germany	Canberra, Australia	6 October 1985
Games Record	42.44	Bahamas	Manchester, England	2002

== Final ==
Rank	Lane	Nation	Competitors	Time	Notes
1st place, gold medalist(s)	4	England	Katherine Endacott, Montell Douglas, Laura Turner, Abiodun Oyepitan	44.19	
2nd place, silver medalist(s)	8	Ghana	Rosina Amenebede, Elizabeth Amolofo, Beatrice Gyaman, Janet Amponsah	45.24	
3rd place, bronze medalist(s)	2	India	Sathi Geetha, Srabani Nanda, P. K. Priya, Hiriyur Jyothi	45.25	
4	7	Nigeria	Seun Adigun, Comfort Onyali, Josephine Ehigie, Agnes Osazuwa	48.87	
–	6	Jamaica	Andrea Bliss, Shanna Thomas, Audria Segree, Dominique Blake		DSQ
–	3	Sierra Leone	Mahriam Kamara, Rebecca Ansumana, Leticia Macauley, Michaela Kargbo		DSQ
–	5	Cameroon			DNS
