= H. M. Jyothi =

Indian sprinter (born 1983)

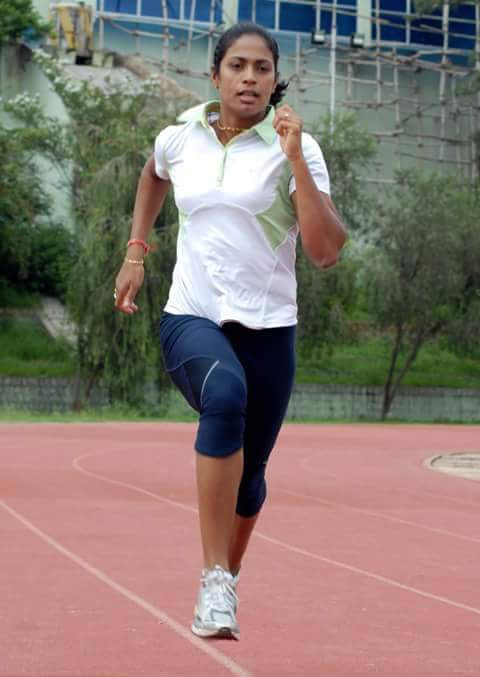
- photo by Sritata, 2016

Personal information
- Full name: Hiriyur Manjunath Jyothi
- Nationality: India
- Born: 1 July 1983 (age 43) Hiriyur, Karnataka, India
- Spouse: S. Srinivas

Sport
- Country: India
- Sport: Sprinter
- Events: 100 metres, 200 metres, 4×100 metres relay
- Team: India
- Coached by: S. Srinivas

Achievements and titles
- Personal bests: 100 m: 11.3 or 11.46 (Bengaluru 2015 or New Delhi 2016); 200 m: 23.42 (New Delhi 2016); 4×100 m relay: 43.42 (Almaty 2016) NR
Medal record
Women's athletics
Representing India
Commonwealth Games
Bronze medal – third place	2010 Delhi	4×100 m relay
Asian Athletics Championships
Bronze medal – third place	2009 Guangzhou	100 m
Asian All Stars Meet
Gold medal – first place	2008 Bhopal	100 m

Hiriyur Manjunath Jyothi (born 1 July 1983) is an Indian sprinter and Commonwealth games medalist. She competes in the 100 metres, 200 metres, and 4×100 metres relay categories. She is a national champion or former national champion in each of the three events, with personal best timings of 11.3 (or 11.46), 23.42, and 43.42 seconds in the 100 metres, 200 metres, and 4×100 metres relay, respectively. Her personal best times in all three events were after her withdrawal from professional competition for three years to become a mother. A Canara Bank employee, Jyothi is married to the former sprinter S. Srinivas, who is also her personal coach. Despite wanting to win a medal at Asian games, she couldn't continue sprint due to persistent achilles injury. She ended up her career in 2017 with a gold at the open nationals, Chennai.

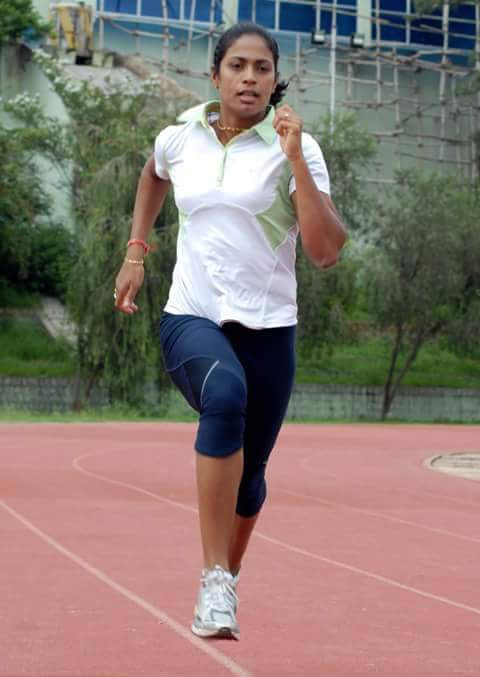
Jyothi in practice

== Early life ==
Jyothi was born to father H. N. Manjunath and mother Thippamma in Hiriyur, Karnataka (near Chitradurga), on 1 July 1983. She has four brothers and sisters, and is the family's second daughter.

== Career highlights ==
- Bronze in the 100 metres at the 2009 Asian Athletics Championships in Guangzhou, China, with a time of 11.60 seconds, India's first sub-400 metres sprint medal in nine years in the Asian Athletics Championships
- Bronze in the 4×100 metres relay at the 2010 Commonwealth Games in New Delhi with a time of 45.25 seconds, running the anchor leg, along with Geetha Satti, Srabani Nanda and P. K. Priya
- Broke the national record in the 4×100 metres relay in May 2016 with a time of 44.03 seconds at the IAAF World Challenge Beijing, with Merlin Joseph, Srabani Nanda, and Dutee Chand
- Broke their own national record in the 4×100 metres relay the following month with a time of 43.42 seconds at Almaty, Kazakhstan, again with Merlin Joseph, Srabani Nanda, and Dutee Chand
- Bronze in the 200 metres with a time of 23.92 seconds at the 2016 Taiwan Open Athletics Championships
- Bronze in the 100 metres with a time of 11.97 seconds at the 2006 Inter-State Championship
- Gold in the 100 metres with a time of 11.87 seconds at the 2015 Inter-State Championship
- Best Athlete Award at the 2016 National Open Championship on winning gold in all three of her events (100 metres in 11.57 seconds, 200 metres in 23.73 seconds, and 4×100 metres relay in 46.52 seconds)
- Overall champion at the 2017 Karnataka State Senior Athletics Championship, with silver in the 200 metres with a time of 24.5 seconds
- She has won around forty medals from nationals and the internationals.

== Awards ==
- Karnataka Olympics Association Award in Athletics in 2016
- Ekalavya Award in Athletics for 2010 from the government of Karnataka
- Rajothsava Award for Sports for 2010 from the government of Karnataka

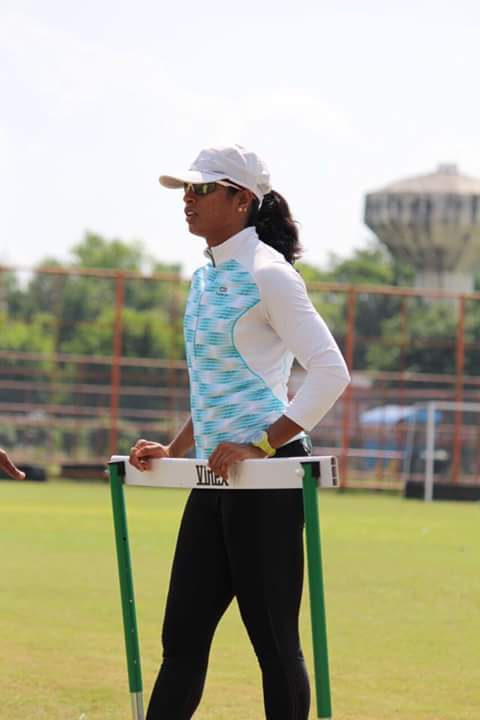
Jyothi warming up during 2016 national championships

== Sponsorship ==
Jyothi has been strongly supported by her parents, who have undergone great financial hardship to finance her ambitions. She has also received sponsorship from her employer, Canara Bank, since 2004, and also receives sponsorship from the Indian Athletics Academy, Bangalore.

== Personal life ==
Jyothi married former sprinter S. Srinivas, who is also her personal coach. In 2011, she withdrew from professional competition and gave birth to a baby girl, dhruthi hassini. She credited her husband with helping her, saying in 2014 that "Being a former medalist at the Asian level he understands my problems. It was because of his help that I'm able to manage my training and taking care of my two-and-half-year old daughter." Post retirement the couple also been blessed with a b. t,
