= Momoko Takahashi =

Japanese sprinter

Personal information
- Born: 16 November 1988 (age 37) Saitama, Japan
- Height: 170 cm (5 ft 7 in)
- Weight: 61 kg (134 lb)
Medal record
Women's athletics
Representing Japan
Asian Games
Silver medal – second place	2006 Doha	4×100 m
Bronze medal – third place	2010 Guangzhou	4×100 m
Asian Championships
Silver medal – second place	2007 Amman	4×100 m
Gold medal – first place	2009 Guangzhou	200 m
Gold medal – first place	2009 Guangzhou	4×100 m
Universiade
Silver medal – second place	2009 Belgrade	100 m

Momoko Takahashi (Japanese: 高橋萌木子; born 16 November 1988 in Saitama) is a Japanese track and field athlete who specialises in sprinting events. She has represented Japan twice at the World Championships in Athletics (2007 and 2009) and won relay medals at the Asian Games in both 2006 and 2010. She was the 200 m gold medallist at the 2009 Asian Athletics Championships.

A Japanese junior record holder, she is the country's second fastest ever runner over both 100 metres and 200 metres, behind Chisato Fukushima. Her bests for the events are 11.32 seconds and 23.15 seconds, respectively. She is a joint holder of the Japanese record in the 4×100 metres relay.

== Career ==
While studying at Saitama Sakae High School, she represented the school in the sprints. In 2005, she won the 100 metres at the national high school championships and then the 200 metres at the National Sports Festival of Japan. In 2006, she established herself with a Japanese junior and high school record of 11.54 seconds for the 100 metres. A third place in the event at that year's Japanese Athletics Championships brought her selection for the 2006 Asian Games. She was sixth in the 100 m final and won a silver medal with the Japanese women's 4×100 metres relay team, finishing behind China.

Takahashi claimed her first national title at the 2007 Japanese Championships, reaching the top of the podium in the women's 100 m. She competed at the 2007 Summer Universiade and ran the 100 m individual and relay events at Osaka's 2007 World Championships in Athletics, although she did not make it past the heats in either competition. She won a relay medal at the 2007 Asian Athletics Championships that year, as the Japanese were runners-up to Thailand. The 2008 season was not as productive for her, as she was fourth nationally and did not get selected for the 2008 Beijing Olympics, but she did improve her 200 m best to 23.48 seconds.

The 2009 Japanese Championships showed a resurgence in Takahashi's form: she was placed second to Chisato Fukushima's national record run over 200 m, but took the 100 m title after her rival withdrew due to an injury. Competing on the world stage for a second time, she ran in the heats of the 100 m, 200 m, and 4×100 m relay of the 2009 World Championships. A medal came at the 2009 Summer Universiade (100 m silver) and she ended the year as the continental champion, having won gold medals in the 200 m and relay at the 2009 Asian Athletics Championships. These performances were part of a Japanese sweep of the women's sprints, as her teammates Fukushima and Asami Tanno won the 100 m and 400 metres titles respectively. Takahashi also set her first Japanese national record that year, as she anchored home a 4 × 100 m relay team of Saori Kitakaze, Fukushima and Mayumi Watanabe in a time of 43.58 seconds at the Osaka Grand Prix.

The 2010 Japanese nationals saw a reversal of the previous year, as Takahashi won the 200 m but was runner-up to Fukushima over 100 m. She was one of the Asia-Pacific team's representatives at the 2010 IAAF Continental Cup, but she finished last in the 200 m, while the Japanese women's relay team that she anchored met a similar fate. She did not manage an individual medal at the 2010 Asian Games in November (coming fourth and sixth in the 100 m and 200 m finals), but she helped a Japanese quartet claim a bronze medal in the short relay.

Her 2011 began with a new national relay record at the Seiko Golden Grand Prix, where she, Saori Kitakaze, Fukushima and Kana Ichikawa knocked nearly two-tenths off the previous time with their run of 43.39 seconds.

== International competitions ==
Year	Competition	Venue	Position	Event	Notes
2006	Asian Games	Doha, Qatar	6th	100 m	11.85
2006	Asian Games	Doha, Qatar	2nd	4 × 100 m relay	39.21
2007	Asian Championships	Amman, Jordan	2nd	4 × 100 m relay	45.06
2007	Universiade	Bangkok, Thailand	19th (qf)	100 m	11.98
2007	Universiade	Bangkok, Thailand	13th (sf)	200 m	24.53
2007	World Championships	Osaka, Japan	43rd (h)	100 m	11.98
2007	World Championships	Osaka, Japan	– (h)	4 × 100 m relay	DQ
2009	Universiade	Belgrade, Serbia	2nd	100 m	11.52
2009	World Championships	Berlin, Germany	36th (h)	100 m	11.75
2009	World Championships	Berlin, Germany	32nd (h)	200 m	23.61
2009	World Championships	Berlin, Germany	14th (h)	4 × 100 m relay	44.24
2009	Asian Championships	Guangzhou, China	1st	200 m	23.53
2009	Asian Championships	Guangzhou, China	1st	4 × 100 m relay	43.93
2010	Continental Cup	Split, Croatia	8th	200 m	
2010	Continental Cup	Split, Croatia	4th	4 × 100 m relay	
2010	Asian Games	Guangzhou, China	4th	100 m	11.50
2010	Asian Games	Guangzhou, China	6th	200 m	23.97
2010	Asian Games	Guangzhou, China	3rd	4 × 100 m relay	44.41
2011	Asian Championships	Kobe, Japan	9th (h)	100 m	11.85
2011	Asian Championships	Kobe, Japan	1st	4 × 100 m relay	44.05
2011	World Championships	Daegu, South Korea	12th (h)	4 × 100 m relay	43.83
