= Hu Kai =

Chinese sprinter (born 1982)

Personal information
- Born: 4 August 1982 (age 44)
Medal record
Men's athletics
Representing China
Summer Universiade
| Gold medal – first place | 2005 Izmir | 100 m |

Hu Kai (simplified Chinese: 胡凯; traditional Chinese: 胡凱; pinyin: Hú Kǎi; born 4 August 1982 in Qingdao, Shandong) is a Chinese sprinter who specializes in the 100 metres. As of 2008, he was pursuing an advanced degree in management. His personal best time is 10.24 seconds, achieved in May 2008 in Beijing. In the 200 metres he has 20.57 seconds, achieved in April 2006 in Chongqing.

== Career ==
He won the 100 metres race at the 2005 Summer Universiade. In the 4 × 100 metres relay he finished fourth at the 2005 Summer Universiade and won a bronze medal at the 2006 Asian Games. He participated at the 2008 Summer Olympics in Beijing where he competed at the 100 metres sprint and placed 4th in his heat, normally resulting in elimination. However his time of 10.39 was the 8th fastest losing time, which was enough to earn a spot in the second round. There he had no chance of advancing to the semi-finals as his time of 10.40 seconds was the eighth and final time of the heat. Together with Wen Yongyi, Zhang Peimeng and Lu Bin he also competed at the 4 × 100 metres relay. In their qualification heat they placed fourth behind Jamaica, Canada and Germany. Their time of 39.13 was the eighth fastest out of sixteen participating nations in the first round and they qualified for the final. There they were however disqualified and placed at the eighth position.
