= Zheng Dongsheng =

Chinese sprinter (born 1992)

Zheng Dongsheng (born 23 January 1992, in Hubei) is a Chinese track and field athlete who specialises in sprinting.

== See also ==
- China at the 2012 Summer Olympics - Athletics
- Athletics at the 2012 Summer Olympics – Men's 4 × 100 metres relay
