= Lu Bin (sprinter) =

Chinese sprinter (born 1987)

Lu Bin (Chinese: 陆斌) (born 19 May 1987 in Suzhou, Jiangsu) is a Chinese sprinter who specializes in the 100 metres.

Lu represented China at the 2008 Summer Olympics in Beijing. He competed at the 4 × 100 metres relay together with Hu Kai, Zhang Peimeng and Wen Yongyi. In their qualification heat they placed fourth behind Jamaica, Canada and Germany. Their time of 39.13 was the eighth-fastest out of sixteen participating nations in the first round and they qualified for the final. There they were, however, disqualified and placed at the eighth position.
