= Srabani Nanda =

Indian sprinter (born 1991)

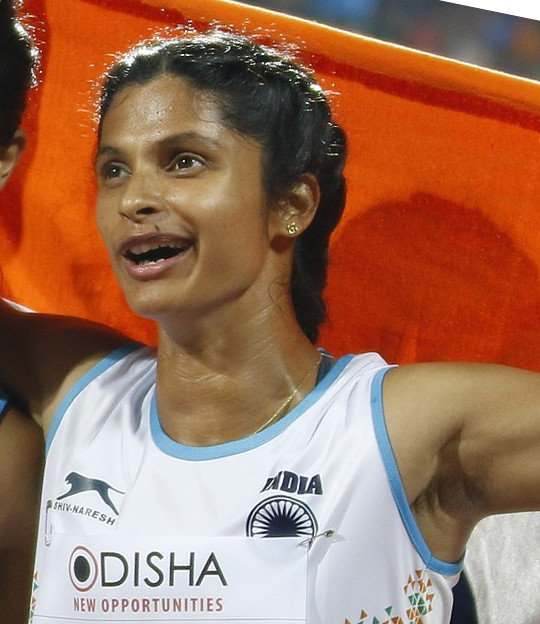
- Nanda at the 2017 Asian Championships

Personal information
- Born: 7 May 1991 (age 35) Phulbani, Odisha, India

Sport
- Sport: Athletics
- Events: 100m, 200m

Achievements and titles
- Personal bests: 100 m: 11.36 (2021); 200 m: 23.07 (2016)
Medal record
Women's athletics
Representing India
Commonwealth Games
Bronze medal – third place	2010 Delhi	4×100m
Asian Championships
Silver medal – second place	2025 Gumi	4×100m
Bronze medal – third place	2015 Wuhan	200 m
Bronze medal – third place	2017 Bhubaneswar	4×100m
Asian Relays
Gold medal – first place	2026 Shaoxing	4×100m
South Asian Games
Gold medal – first place	2016 Guwahati	200 m
Silver medal – second place	2016 Guwahati	100 m
Silver medal – second place	2016 Guwahati	4x100m
Asian Junior Championships
Gold medal – first place	2010 Hanoi	4×100m
Commonwealth Youth Games
Gold medal – first place	2008 Pune	4×100m

Srabani Nanda (born 7 May 1991) is an Indian sprinter. She represented India in the 200 m at the 2016 Rio Olympics.

== International competitions ==
Representing India
Year	Competition	Host	Position	Event	Result
2007	World Youth Championships	Ostrava, Czech Republic	5th	Medley relay	2:10.18
2008	Commonwealth Youth Games	Pune, India	10th (sf)	200 m	24.92
2008	Commonwealth Youth Games	Pune, India	1st	4 × 100 m relay	46.27
2010	Asian Junior Championships	Hanoi, Vietnam	15th (h)	100 m	12.49
2010	Asian Junior Championships	Hanoi, Vietnam	1st	4 × 100 m relay	45.82
2010	Commonwealth Games	Delhi, India	3rd	4 × 100 m relay	45.25
2010	Asian Games	Guangzhou, China	5th	4 × 100 m relay	45.23
2013	Asian Championships	Pune, India	7th	200 m	24.38
2013	Asian Championships	Pune, India	4th	4 × 100 m relay	45.03
2014	Commonwealth Games	Glasgow, Scotland	9th (h)	4 × 100 m relay	44.81
2014	Asian Games	Incheon, South Korea	6th	4 × 100 m relay	44.91
2015	Asian Championships	Wuhan, China	5th	100 m	11.48
2015	Asian Championships	Wuhan, China	3rd	200 m	23.54
2015	Asian Championships	Wuhan, China	4th	4 × 100 m relay	45.72
2016	South Asian Games	Guwahati, India	2nd	100 m	11.72
2016	South Asian Games	Guwahati, India	1st	200 m	23.91
2016	South Asian Games	Guwahati, India	2nd	4 × 100 m relay	45.79
2016	Asian Indoor Championships	Doha, Qatar	–	60 m	DQ
2016	Olympic Games	Rio, Brazil	55th (h)	200 m	23.58
2017	Asian Championships	Bhubaneswar, India	5th	200 m	23.67
2017	Asian Championships	Bhubaneswar, India	3rd	4 × 100 m relay	44.57
2022	Commonwealth Games	Birmingham, England	4th	4 × 100 m relay	43.81
2025	Asian Championships	Gumi, South Korea	2nd	4 × 100 m relay	43.86
2026	Asian Relays	Shaoxing, China	1st	4 × 100 m relay	43.85
