= Jiang Lan (sprinter) =

Chinese sprinter (born 1989)

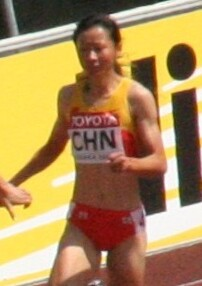
- Jiang Lan at the 2007 World Championships

Personal information
- Born: 27 June 1989 (age 36) Suzhou, Jiangsu, China

Chinese name
- Simplified Chinese: 蒋兰
- Traditional Chinese: 蔣蘭
Transcriptions
Standard Mandarin
- Hanyu Pinyin: Jiǎng Lán
Medal record
Women's athletics
Representing China
Asian Games
Silver medal – second place	2010 Guangzhou	4×100 m
Asian Championships
Bronze medal – third place	2009 Guangzhou	200 m
Asian Indoor Championships
Gold medal – first place	2010 Tehran	60 m

Jiang Lan (Chinese: 蒋兰; born 27 June 1989 in Suzhou, Jiangsu) is a female Chinese track and field sprinter who specializes in the 100 metres. Her personal best time is 11.49 seconds, achieved in October 2007 in Wuhan. In the 200 metres she has a best of 23.46 seconds.

Jiang represented China at the 2008 Summer Olympics in Beijing competing at the 4 × 100 metres relay together with Wang Jing, Tao Yujia and Qin Wangping. In their first round heat they placed fourth behind Jamaica, Russia and Germany. Their time of 43.78 seconds was the tenth time overall out of sixteen participating nations. With this result they failed to qualify for the final.

Jiang won the 100 m gold and 200 m silver at the 11th National Games of the People's Republic of China, as well as a silver in the relay for Jiangsu. She has also won medals at regional level competitions with a 200 m bronze at the 2009 Asian Athletics Championships and a gold from the 2009 East Asian Games among her past performances.

She has also competed in the 60 metres event indoors: she finished fifth at the 2009 Asian Indoor Games and won the gold medal at the 2010 Asian Indoor Athletics Championships.

Jiang shared in the relay silver at the 2010 Asian Games. She failed to make it out of the 200 m heats at the 2011 Asian Athletics Championships but won another relay silver in the 4 × 100 m event. She competed in the team event at the 2011 World Championships in Athletics but the Chinese runners were disqualified. In March 2013 she broke her first Chinese record by running the 200 m indoors in a time of 23.52 seconds.
