= Liang Jiahong =

Chinese sprinter (born 1988)

Personal information
- Born: March 6, 1988 (age 38)
- Height: 1.84 m (6 ft 1/2 in)
- Weight: 84 kg (185 lb)

Sport
- Country: China
- Sport: Athletics
- Event: 4 × 100 m relay
Medal record
Men's athletics
Representing China
Asian Championships
Silver medal – second place	2009 Guangzhou	4 × 100 m
Bronze medal – third place	2007 Amman	4 × 100 m

Liang Jiahong (born 6 March 1988 in Longjiang, Shunde, Foshan, Guangdong) is a Chinese sprinter who specializes in the 100 metres.

He finished fifth at the 2006 World Junior Championships. At the 2007 Asian Championships he won a bronze medal in the relay. He was an unused reserve runner in the 4 × 100 metres relay event at the 2008 Summer Olympics. However, he won the relay gold medal at the 11th Chinese National Games in 2009. He won the relay silver medal with China at the 2009 Asian Athletics Championships later that year. He was one of the 2012 Olympic Chinese men's 4 × 100 m team.

His personal best time is 10.31 seconds, achieved in May 2010 in Zhaoqing. In the 200 metres he has a 20.83 seconds personal best, achieved in April 2008 in Hangzhou.
