= Naoki Tsukahara =

Japanese sprinter (born 1985)

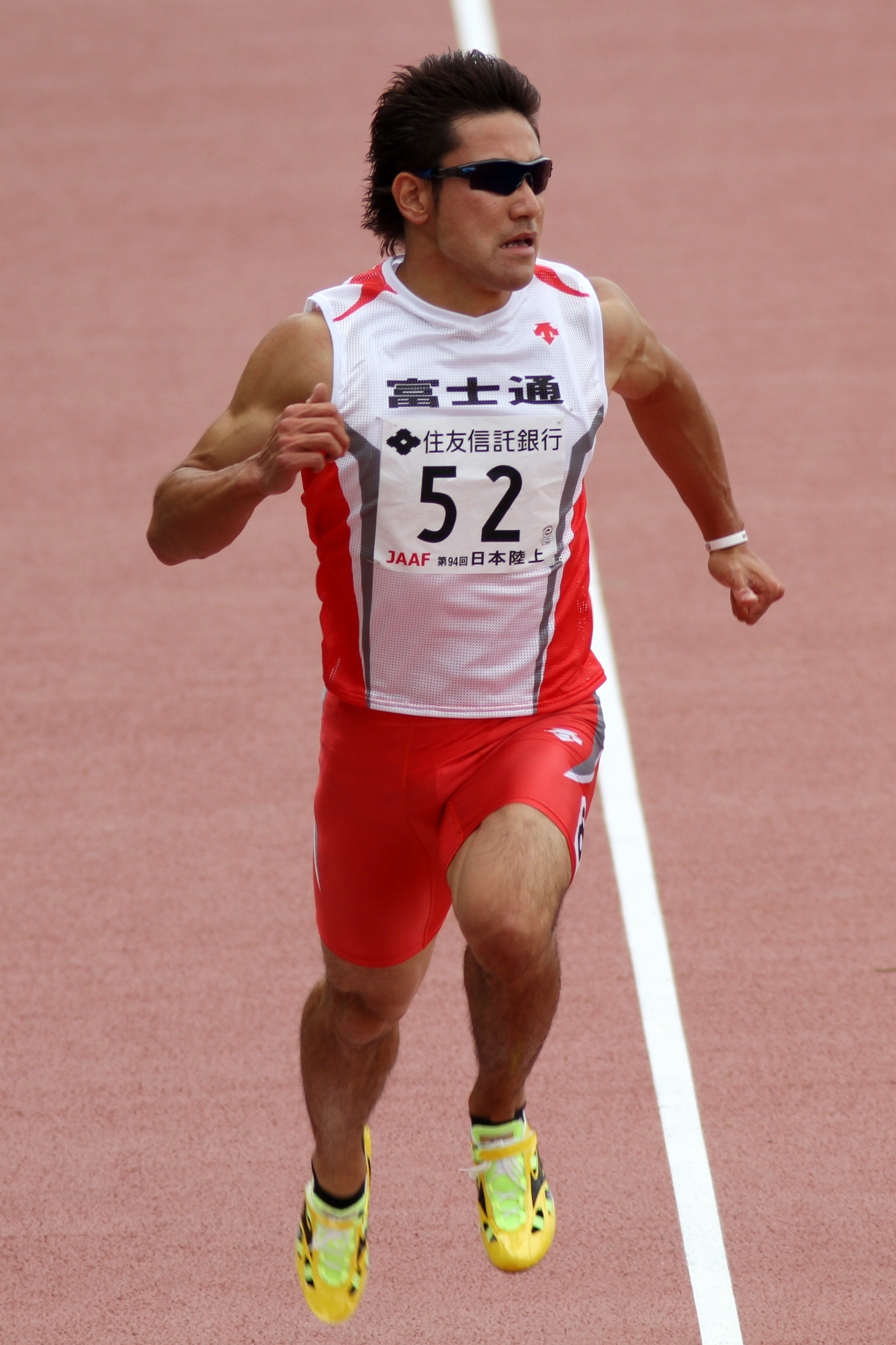
- Tsukahara at the 2010 Japan Championship

Personal information
- Nationality: Japan
- Born: 10 May 1985 (age 41) Okaya, Nagano
- Height: 180 cm (5 ft 11 in)
- Weight: 77 kg (170 lb)

Sport
- Sport: Running
- Event(s): 100 metres, 200 metres
- University team: Tokai University
- Club: Fujitsu Track & Field Team
- Retired: 2016

Achievements and titles
- Personal best(s): 100 m: 10.09 s (Hiroshima 2009); 200 m: 20.35 s (Yokohama 2006)
Medal record
Men's Athletics
Representing Japan
Olympics
Silver medal – second place	2008 Beijing	4 × 100 m relay
Asian Games
Silver medal – second place	2006 Doha	100 m
Silver medal – second place	2006 Doha	4 × 100 m relay
Asian Championships
Gold medal – first place	2009 Guangzhou	4 × 100 m relay
Silver medal – second place	2009 Guangzhou	100 m
World Junior Championships
Bronze medal – third place	2004 Grosseto	4 × 100 m relay

Naoki Tsukahara (塚原 直貴; born 10 May 1985) is a Japanese track and field sprinter who specialises in the 100 metres.

He was seventh in 100 m at the 58th National Sports Festival of Japan in 2003. After coming sixth over 200 m at the 2004 Japan Student Athletics Championships, he returned two years later to place runner-up in both short sprints. The 2006 Japan Championships in Athletics saw him with the 100 m title and take third in the 200 m.

Tsukahara represented Japan at the 2008 Summer Olympics in Beijing where he competed at the 100 metre sprint and placed second in his first heat after Churandy Martina in a time of 10.39 seconds. He qualified for the second round in which he improved his time to 10.23 seconds, finishing third behind Martina and Michael Frater. In the 100 m semi-finals Tsukahara achieved a time of 10.16 seconds, his best of the season, but finished in seventh place, failing to qualify for the final.

Together with Shingo Suetsugu, Shinji Takahira and Nobuharu Asahara, Tsukahara also competed in the 4 × 100 metres relay final at the 2008 Summer Olympics. In their qualification heat, the team placed second behind Trinidad and Tobago, ahead of the teams from the Netherlands and Brazil. Their time of 38.52 s was the third fastest out of sixteen participating nations in the first round and they qualified for the final. There they sprinted to a time of 38.15 seconds, placing third after the Jamaican and Trinidad teams, winning the bronze medal. However, in January 2017, Jamaica's gold medal was revoked after one of their athletes was found to have been doping, meaning that the Japanese team received silver. The achievement was a historic one in terms of Japanese olympians; it is the first track medal won by Japanese athletes in 80 years, as well as being the first medal won by male Japanese athletes.

Tsukahara had a strong start to the 2009 season, improving his 200 m best in early May to 20.61 s. He also set a new 100 m personal best at the 2009 Osaka Grand Prix. He easily won with a time of 10.13 seconds but still felt that he was capable of running faster.

== National titles ==
- Japan Championships in Athletics
  - 100 metres: 2006, 2007, 2008

== International competitions ==
Year	Competition	Venue	Position	Event	Notes
Representing Japan
2004	World Junior Championships	Grosseto, Italy	12th (sf)	100 m	10.55 (wind: +0.3 m/s)
2004	World Junior Championships	Grosseto, Italy	3rd	4 × 100 m relay	39.43 (relay leg: 4th)
2006	World Cup	Athens, Greece	3rd	4 × 100 m relay	38.51 (relay leg: 1st)
2006	Asian Games	Doha, Qatar	2nd	100 m	10.34 (wind: +0.3 m/s)
2006	Asian Games	Doha, Qatar	2nd	4 × 100 m relay	39.21 (relay leg: 1st)
2007	World Championships	Osaka, Japan	20th (qf)	100 m	10.31 (wind: -0.3 m/s)
2007	World Championships	Osaka, Japan	5th	4 × 100 m relay	38.03 (relay leg: 1st) AR
2008	Olympic Games	Beijing, China	13th (sf)	100 m	10.16 (wind: +0.3 m/s)
2008	Olympic Games	Beijing, China	2nd	4 × 100 m relay	38.15 (relay leg: 1st)
2009	World Championships	Berlin, Germany	15th (sf)	100 m	10.25 (wind: -0.2 m/s)
2009	World Championships	Berlin, Germany	4th	4 × 100 m relay	38.30 (relay leg: 2nd)
2009	Asian Championships	Guangzhou, China	2nd	100 m	10.32 (wind: -0.1 m/s)
2009	Asian Championships	Guangzhou, China	1st	4 × 100 m relay	39.01 (relay leg: 2nd)
2010	Continental Cup	Split, Croatia	2nd	4 × 100 m relay	39.28 (relay leg: 2ndg)
2013	Asian Championships	Pune, India	7th	100 m	10.54 (wind: -0.3 m/s)

== Personal bests ==
Event	Best	Location	Date
100 metres	10.09 s	Hiroshima, Japan	27 June 2009
200 metres	20.35 s	Yokohama, Japan	21 May 2006

== Records ==
- 4 × 100 m relay
  - Former Asian record holder - 38.03 s (relay leg: 1st) (Osaka, 1 September 2007)^{[a]}

^{a} with Shingo Suetsugu, Shinji Takahira, and Nobuharu Asahara
