= Yahya Habeeb =

Saudi Arabian track and field athlete (born 1986)

Medal record

Men's athletics

Representing Saudi Arabia

World Youth Championships
Silver medal – second place	2003 Sherbrooke	100 m

Asian Games
Gold medal – first place	2006 Doha	100 m

Yahya Hassan Ibrahim Habeeb (Arabic: يحيى حبيب; born 1 April 1986) is a Saudi Arabian track and field athlete who specialises in sprinting events. He was the gold medallist over 100 metres at the 2006 Asian Games and represented Saudi Arabia at the 2007 World Championships in Athletics. His best for the distance is 10.28 seconds.

== Early career and achievements ==
He made his first appearance on the world stage at the age of fifteen, competing in the 100 metres and 200 metres events at the 2001 World Youth Championships in Athletics. The following year he won the 100 m at the Gulf Cooperation Council Youth Championships and was the silver medallist at the 2002 Pan Arab Junior Championships. He reached the quarter-finals of the 100 m at the 2002 World Junior Championships in Athletics. He rose to prominence alongside fellow Saudi sprinter Yahya Al-Gahes, as Habeeb was the 100 m runner-up behind him at the 2003 World Youth Championships in Athletics and then the 2004 Asian Junior Athletics Championships.

Habeeb tested positive for the banned substance Prednisolone on the Asian Grand Prix circuit in 2004 and as a result he received a public warning and his mark at the competition was disqualified. He ran at the 2004 World Junior Championships in Athletics later that season and was a semi-finalist. After a quiet 2005, he set a personal best of 10.28 seconds in Doha in May 2006. He went on to claim the national title and then won the 100 m at the 2006 Asian Games, defeating Naoki Tsukahara who was the pre-race favourite. He also helped the Saudi Arabian men to sixth place in the 4×100 metres relay.

He began 2007 with individual and relay wins over 100 m at the Arab Championships. He competed at the 2007 Asian Athletics Championships and the 2007 World Championships in Athletics, but failed to progress beyond the qualifying rounds at either competition. He was chosen for the relay team at the 2007 Pan Arab Games and won the gold medal alongside Moussa Al-Housaoui, Yahya Al-Gahes and Salem Mubarak Al-Yami. He ran in the 60 metres at the 2007 Asian Indoor Games but was disqualified in the semi-finals.

He made a handful of appearances in 2008, running in the United States and Finland, but did not compete internationally that year. He was a semi-finalist in the 100 m at the 2009 Asian Athletics Championships. He attempted to defend his title at the 2010 Asian Games and gave his best performance in three years, running a time of 10.35 seconds, although that was only enough for fifth place. He was also part of the Saudi Arabian relay team which finished seventh that year.
