= Guo Fan (athlete) =

Chinese sprinter

Personal information
- Born: December 10, 1985 (age 40)
- Height: 1.70 m (5 ft 7 in)
- Weight: 60 kg (130 lb)

Sport
- Country: China
- Sport: Athletics
- Event: 4 × 100m relay
Medal record
Men's athletics
Representing China
Asian Championships
| Silver medal – second place | 2009 Guangzhou | 4×100 m |
| Bronze medal – third place | 2009 Guangzhou | 100 m |

Guo Fan (Chinese: 郭凡; born December 10, 1985, in Xindu 新度, Licheng District, Putian, Fujian) is a Chinese track and field athlete who specialises in sprinting.

== See also ==
- China at the 2012 Summer Olympics - Athletics
  - Athletics at the 2012 Summer Olympics – Men's 4 × 100 metres relay
