= Athletics at the 2002 Asian Games – Men's 4 × 100 metres relay =

Men's 4 × 100 metres relay at the 2002 Asian Games
- Venue: Busan Asiad Main Stadium
- Dates: 10–13 October 2002
- Competitors: 48 from 11 nations

Medalists
gold medal	Thailand; Reanchai Seeharwong, Vissanu Sophanich, Ekkachai Janthana, Sittichai Suwonprateep
silver medal	Japan; Hisashi Miyazaki, Shingo Suetsugu, Hiroyasu Tsuchie, Nobuharu Asahara
bronze medal	China; Shen Yunbao, Chen Haijian, Yin Hanzhao, Han Chaoming

The men's 4 × 100 metres relay competition at the 2002 Asian Games in Busan, South Korea was held on 10 and 13 October at the Busan Asiad Main Stadium.

== Schedule ==
All times are Korea Standard Time (UTC+09:00)

Date	Time	Event
Thursday, 10 October 2002	14:00	1st round
Sunday, 13 October 2002	10:20	Final

== Records ==
Prior to this competition, the existing world, Asian and Games records were as follows.

World Record	United States; United States	37.40	Barcelona, Spain; Stuttgart, Germany	8 August 1992; 21 August 1993
Asian Record	Japan	38.31	Athens, Greece	9 August 1997
Games Record	Japan	38.91	Bangkok, Thailand	15 December 1998

== Results ==
Legend

- DNF — Did not finish

=== 1st round ===
- Qualification: First 3 in each heat (Q) and the next 2 fastest (q) advance to the final.

==== Heat 1 ====
Rank	Team	Time	Notes
1	Japan (JPN); Hisashi Miyazaki; Shingo Suetsugu; Hiroyasu Tsuchie; Nobuharu Asahara	39.17	Q
2	Thailand (THA); Reanchai Seeharwong; Vissanu Sophanich; Ekkachai Janthana; Sittichai Suwonprateep	39.24	Q
3	India (IND); Anil Kumar Prakash; Piyush Kumar; Clifford Joshua; Sanjay Ghosh	39.71	Q
4	Chinese Taipei (TPE); Liu Yuan-kai; Liu Chih-hung; Chang Po-chih; Huang Hsin-ping	40.15	q
5	Oman (OMA); Ahmed Al-Moamari; Hamoud Al-Dalhami; Mohammed Al-Hooti; Musabah Al-Masoudi	40.32	q
6	Hong Kong (HKG); Ryan Lai; William To; Tang Hon Sing; Chiang Wai Hung	40.59	

==== Heat 2 ====
Rank	Team	Time	Notes
1	China (CHN); Shen Yunbao; Chen Haijian; Yin Hanzhao; Han Chaoming	39.21	Q
2	Saudi Arabia (KSA); Yahya Habeeb; Mubarak Ata Mubarak; Khalifah Al-Sager; Jamal Al-Saffar	40.01	Q
3	Malaysia (MAS); Tan Kok Lim; Nazmizan Mohamad; Zaiful Zainal Abidin; Azmi Ibrahim	40.30	Q
4	South Korea (KOR); Park Seung-hyuk; Kim Sang-do; Shin Jung-ki; Lee Kwang-pil	40.34	
—	Qatar (QAT); Sultan Al-Sheib; Khalid Al-Obaidli; Abdulla Al-Hamad; Saad Al-Shahwani	DNF	

=== Final ===
Rank	Team	Time	Notes
1st place, gold medalist(s)	Thailand (THA); Reanchai Seeharwong; Vissanu Sophanich; Ekkachai Janthana; Sittichai Suwonprateep	38.82	GR
2nd place, silver medalist(s)	Japan (JPN); Hisashi Miyazaki; Shingo Suetsugu; Hiroyasu Tsuchie; Nobuharu Asahara	38.90	
3rd place, bronze medalist(s)	China (CHN); Shen Yunbao; Chen Haijian; Yin Hanzhao; Han Chaoming	39.09	
4	India (IND); Sanjay Ghosh; Piyush Kumar; Anand Menezes; Anil Kumar Prakash	39.36	
5	Saudi Arabia (KSA); Yahya Al-Ghahes; Mubarak Ata Mubarak; Salem Al-Yami; Jamal Al-Saffar	40.00	
6	Chinese Taipei (TPE); Liu Chih-hung; Tsai Meng-lin; Chang Po-chih; Huang Hsin-ping	40.02	
7	Oman (OMA); Ahmed Al-Moamari; Hamoud Al-Dalhami; Mohammed Al-Hooti; Musabah Al-Masoudi	40.19	
8	Malaysia (MAS); Tan Kok Lim; Nazmizan Mohamad; Zaiful Zainal Abidin; Azmi Ibrahim	41.20	
