= 2002 Asian Athletics Championships – Men's 200 metres =

The men's 200 metres event at the 2002 Asian Athletics Championships was held in Colombo, Sri Lanka on 11–12 August.

== Medalists ==
Gold	Silver	Bronze
Gennadiy Chernovol; Kazakhstan	Fawzi Al-Shammari; Kuwait	Sittichai Suwonprateep; Thailand

== Results ==
=== Heats ===
Rank	Heat	Name	Nationality	Time	Notes
1	3	Fawzi Al-Shammari	Kuwait	21.27	Q
2	1	Sittichai Suwonprateep	Thailand	21.29	Q
3	3	Prasanna Amarasekara	Sri Lanka	21.30	Q
4	4	Gennadiy Chernovol	Kazakhstan	21.33	Q
5	1	Mohamed Al-Houti	Oman	21.44	Q
6	3	Ekkachai Janthana	Thailand	21.50	Q
6	4	Anand Menezes	India	21.50	Q
8	1	Abdulla Khamis Al-Hamad	Qatar	21.57	Q
9	3	Tsai Meng-Lin	Chinese Taipei	21.59	q
10	2	Sulaiman Hamid Aosman	Qatar	21.63	Q
11	5	Hamed Hamadan Al-Bishi	Saudi Arabia	21.64	Q
12	4	Jon Dhanuska Perera	Sri Lanka	21.71	Q
13	1	Yusuke Omae	Japan	21.75	
13	5	Ahmad Sakeh Sumarsono	Indonesia	21.75	Q
15	2	Suminda Mendis	Sri Lanka	21.77	Q
16	5	Tatsuya Ito	Japan	21.78	Q
17	5	Hamood Al-Dalhami	Oman	21.78	
18	4	Chang Po-Chih	Chinese Taipei	21.94	
19	3	Nguyen Thanh Hai	Vietnam	21.97	
20	2	Clifford Joshua	India	22.21	Q
21	1	Wang Peng	China	22.24	
22	2	Nazmizan Mohamad	Malaysia	22.30	
23	4	Azmi Ibrahim	Malaysia	22.61	
24	2	Ho Kwan Lung	Hong Kong	22.67	SB
25	3	Lu Ka Pun	Hong Kong	23.15	PB
26	2	Ang Fu Hong	Singapore	23.26	PB
27	4	Piphop Rasme Prum Keo	Cambodia	23.60	PB
28	5	Mohamed Amir	Maldives	23.77	PB
29	3	Abdullah Ibrahim	Maldives	24.21	PB
30	5	Bona Kong	Cambodia	24.23	PB
	1	Zakaria Messaiké	Lebanon	DNF	
	1	Mohd Shameer Ayub	Singapore	DNS	
	2	Salem Al-Yami	Saudi Arabia	DNS	

=== Semifinals ===
Wind:
Heat 1: 2.0 m/s

Rank	Heat	Name	Nationality	Time	Notes
1	2	Gennadiy Chernovol	Kazakhstan	21.00	Q
2	2	Sittichai Suwonprateep	Thailand	21.00	Q
3	1	Fawzi Al-Shammari	Kuwait	21.09	Q
4	2	Prasanna Amarasekara	Sri Lanka	21.28	Q
5	1	Anand Menezes	India	21.37	Q
6	1	Ekkachai Janthana	Thailand	21.44	Q
7	2	Hamed Hamadan Al-Bishi	Saudi Arabia	21.48	q
8	1	Tatsuya Ito	Japan	21.54	q
9	1	Sulaiman Hamid Aosman	Qatar	21.57	SB
9	2	Jon Dhanuska Perera	Sri Lanka	21.57	
11	2	Tsai Meng-Lin	Chinese Taipei	21.61	
12	1	Suminda Mendis	Sri Lanka	21.62	
12	2	Clifford Joshua	India	21.62	
14	2	Abdulla Khamis Al-Hamad	Qatar	21.78	
15	1	Ahmad Sakeh Sumarsono	Indonesia	21.81	
	1	Mohamed Al-Houti	Oman	DQ	

=== Final ===
Wind: +1.7 m/s

Rank	Name	Nationality	Time	Notes
1st place, gold medalist(s)	Gennadiy Chernovol	Kazakhstan	20.73	
2nd place, silver medalist(s)	Fawzi Al-Shammari	Kuwait	20.92	
3rd place, bronze medalist(s)	Sittichai Suwonprateep	Thailand	21.04	
4	Prasanna Amarasekara	Sri Lanka	21.32	
5	Anand Menezes	India	21.32	
6	Hamed Hamadan Al-Bishi	Saudi Arabia	21.32	
7	Tatsuya Ito	Japan	21.54	
8	Ekkachai Janthana	Thailand	21.74	
