= Athletics at the 2002 Asian Games – Men's 100 metres =

Athletic Competition

Men's 100 metres at the 2002 Asian Games
- Venue: Busan Asiad Main Stadium
- Dates: 7–8 October 2002
- Competitors: 20 from 11 nations

Medalists
gold medal	Jamal Al-Saffar	Saudi Arabia
silver medal	Nobuharu Asahara	Japan
bronze medal	Chen Haijian	China

The men's 100 metres competition at the 2002 Asian Games in Busan, South Korea was held on 7–8 October at the Busan Asiad Main Stadium.

== Schedule ==
All times are Korea Standard Time (UTC+09:00)

Date	Time	Event
Monday, 7 October 2002	09:50	1st round
Tuesday, 8 October 2002	11:30	Semifinals
Tuesday, 8 October 2002	16:00	Final

== Records ==
Prior to this competition, the existing world, Asian and Games records were as follows.

World Record	~~Tim Montgomery (USA)~~; Maurice Greene (USA)	~~9.78~~; 9.79	~~Paris, France~~; Athens, Greece	~~14 September 2002~~; 16 June 1999
Asian Record	Koji Ito (JPN)	10.00	Bangkok, Thailand	13 December 1998
Games Record	Koji Ito (JPN)	10.00	Bangkok, Thailand	13 December 1998

- Tim Montgomery's world record was rescinded in 2005.

== Results ==
=== 1st round ===
- Qualification: First 4 in each heat (Q) and the next 4 fastest (q) advance to the semifinals.

==== Heat 1 ====
- Wind: −0.4 m/s

Rank	Athlete	Time	Notes
1	Nobuharu Asahara (JPN)	10.40	Q
2	Shen Yunbao (CHN)	10.54	Q
3	Salem Al-Yami (KSA)	10.61	Q
4	Saad Al-Shahwani (QAT)	10.69	Q
5	Reanchai Seeharwong (THA)	10.72	q
6	Liu Chih-hung (TPE)	10.93	

==== Heat 2 ====
- Wind: −1.1 m/s

Rank	Athlete	Time	Notes
1	Jamal Al-Saffar (KSA)	10.44	Q
2	Tsai Meng-lin (TPE)	10.60	Q
3	Sittichai Suwonprateep (THA)	10.64	Q
4	William To (HKG)	10.78	Q
5	Kim Sang-do (KOR)	10.82	q
6	Ahmed Al-Moamari (OMA)	10.91	
7	Nobuhiro Tajima (JPN)	10.97	

==== Heat 3 ====
- Wind: +0.6 m/s

Rank	Athlete	Time	Notes
1	Chen Haijian (CHN)	10.33	Q
2	Gennadiy Chernovol (KAZ)	10.37	Q
3	Khalid Al-Obaidli (QAT)	10.44	Q
4	U. K. Shyam (SIN)	10.63	Q
5	Chiang Wai Hung (HKG)	10.64	q
6	Shin Jung-ki (KOR)	10.81	q
7	Juma Al-Jabri (OMA)	11.37	

=== Semifinals ===
- Qualification: First 4 in each heat (Q) advance to the final.

==== Heat 1 ====
- Wind: −0.8 m/s

Rank	Athlete	Time	Notes
1	Nobuharu Asahara (JPN)	10.38	Q
2	Chen Haijian (CHN)	10.42	Q
3	Khalid Al-Obaidli (QAT)	10.63	Q
4	Tsai Meng-lin (TPE)	10.68	Q
5	Chiang Wai Hung (HKG)	10.76	
6	U. K. Shyam (SIN)	10.79	
7	Reanchai Seeharwong (THA)	10.81	
8	Shin Jung-ki (KOR)	10.93	

==== Heat 2 ====
- Wind: +0.5 m/s

Rank	Athlete	Time	Notes
1	Jamal Al-Saffar (KSA)	10.24	Q
2	Gennadiy Chernovol (KAZ)	10.36	Q
3	Shen Yunbao (CHN)	10.45	Q
4	Salem Al-Yami (KSA)	10.45	Q
5	Sittichai Suwonprateep (THA)	10.47	
6	Saad Al-Shahwani (QAT)	10.56	
7	William To (HKG)	10.66	
8	Kim Sang-do (KOR)	10.67	

=== Final ===
- Wind: +0.3 m/s

Rank	Athlete	Time	Notes
1st place, gold medalist(s)	Jamal Al-Saffar (KSA)	10.24	
2nd place, silver medalist(s)	Nobuharu Asahara (JPN)	10.29	
3rd place, bronze medalist(s)	Chen Haijian (CHN)	10.34	
4	Gennadiy Chernovol (KAZ)	10.35	
5	Salem Al-Yami (KSA)	10.36	
6	Shen Yunbao (CHN)	10.43	
7	Khalid Al-Obaidli (QAT)	10.52	
8	Tsai Meng-lin (TPE)	10.53	
