= 2002 Asian Athletics Championships – Men's 100 metres =

The men's 100 metres event at the 2002 Asian Athletics Championships was held in Colombo, Sri Lanka on 9–10 August.

== Medalists ==
Gold	Silver	Bronze
Jamal Al-Saffar; Saudi Arabia	Gennadiy Chernovol; Kazakhstan	Salem Al-Yami; Saudi Arabia

== Results ==
=== Heats ===
Rank	Heat	Name	Nationality	Time	Notes
1	1	Salem Al-Yami	Saudi Arabia	10.55	Q
2	1	Hiroyasu Tsuchie	Japan	10.64	Q
3	1	Khaled Yousef Al-Obaidli	Qatar	10.68	Q
4	1	Chintake De Zoysa	Sri Lanka	10.78	q
5	1	Suminda Mendis	Sri Lanka	10.82	q, PB
6	1	Vissanu Sophanich	Thailand	10.87	
7	1	Zakaria Messaiké	Lebanon	11.06	
	1	Khalil Al-Hanahneh	Jordan	DNS	
1	2	Gennadiy Chernovol	Kazakhstan	10.59	Q
2	2	Yuta Kanno	Japan	10.64	Q
3	2	Shen Yunbao	China	10.72	Q
4	2	Tsai Meng-Lin	Chinese Taipei	10.74	q
5	2	Lim Tan Kok	Malaysia	10.83	q
6	2	Ahmad Hudeib Al-Mamari	Oman	10.97	
7	2	Tang Yui Han	Singapore	11.61	PB
8	2	Chaleunsouk Oudomphanh	Laos	11.76	SB
1	3	Jamal Al-Saffar	Saudi Arabia	10.57	Q
2	3	Reanchai Srihawong	Thailand	10.72	Q
3	3	Shin Jung-Ki	South Korea	10.79	
4	3	Chen Tien-Wen	Chinese Taipei	10.74	q
5	3	To Wai Lok	Hong Kong	10.92	
6	3	Poh Seng Song	Singapore	11.10	SB
7	3	Abdullah Ibrahim	Maldives	12.04	PB
	3	Sudath Ravindra Kumara	Sri Lanka	DQ	
1	4	Chen Haijian	China	10.65	Q
2	4	Saad Faraj Al-Shahwani	Qatar	10.67	Q
3	4	Azmi Ibrahim	Malaysia	10.78	Q
4	4	Chiang Wai Hung	Malaysia	10.89	
5	4	Nguyen Thanh Hai	Vietnam	11.16	PB
6	4	Piphop Rasme Prum Keo	Cambodia	11.70	PB
7	4	Bona Kong	Cambodia	11.75	PB
	4	Hamood Al-Dalhami	Oman	DQ	

=== Semifinals ===
Rank	Heat	Name	Nationality	Time	Notes
1	2	Gennadiy Chernovol	Kazakhstan	10.55	Q
2	2	Jamal Al-Saffar	Saudi Arabia	10.58	Q
3	1	Salem Al-Yami	Saudi Arabia	10.67	Q
3	2	Shen Yunbao	China	10.67	Q
5	2	Yuta Kanno	Japan	10.76	Q
6	1	Hiroyasu Tsuchie	Japan	10.77	Q
7	1	Chen Haijian	China	10.78	Q
8	1	Khaled Yousef Al-Obaidli	Qatar	10.79	Q
9	2	Chintake De Zoysa	Sri Lanka	10.82	
10	2	Saad Faraj Al-Shahwani	Qatar	10.86	
11	2	Tsai Meng-Lin	Chinese Taipei	10.87	
12	1	Reanchai Srihawong	Thailand	10.90	
13	2	Lim Tan Kok	Malaysia	11.04	
14	1	Suminda Mendis	Sri Lanka	11.06	
15	1	Azmi Ibrahim	Malaysia	11.18	
16	1	Chen Tien-Wen	Chinese Taipei	11.75	

=== Final ===
Wind: +3.1 m/s

Rank	Name	Nationality	Time	Notes
1st place, gold medalist(s)	Jamal Al-Saffar	Saudi Arabia	10.43	
2nd place, silver medalist(s)	Gennadiy Chernovol	Kazakhstan	10.50	
3rd place, bronze medalist(s)	Salem Al-Yami	Saudi Arabia	10.52	
4	Hiroyasu Tsuchie	Japan	10.62	
5	Shen Yunbao	China	10.70	
6	Yuta Kanno	Japan	10.75	
7	Chen Haijian	China	10.81	
	Khaled Yousef Al-Obaidli	Qatar	DNF	
