= 2003 Asian Athletics Championships – Men's 100 metres =

The men's 100 metres event at the 2003 Asian Athletics Championships was held in Manila, Philippines on September 20–21.

== Medalists ==
Gold	Silver	Bronze
Chen Haijian; China	Gennadiy Chernovol; Kazakhstan	Salem Al-Yami; Saudi Arabia

== Results ==
=== Heats ===
Wind: Heat 1: 0.0 m/s, Heat 2: +1.0 m/s, Heat 3: -0.1 m/s, Heat 4: +0.3 m/s, Heat 5: -0.1 m/s

Rank	Heat	Name	Nationality	Time	Notes
1	2	Gennadiy Chernovol	Kazakhstan	10.34	Q
2	4	Shingo Kawabata	Japan	10.42	Q
2	5	Shen Yunbao	China	10.42	Q
4	2	Adel Mohamed Al-Farhan	Bahrain	10.46	Q
5	4	Abdolghafar Saghar	Iran	10.50	Q
6	2	Anil Kumar	India	10.51	Q
7	3	Chen Haijian	China	10.52	Q
7	5	Sittichai Suwonprateep	Thailand	10.52	Q
9	2	Khalifa Al-Saker	Saudi Arabia	10.55	Q
9	5	Sanjay Ghosh	India	10.55	Q
11	1	Salem Al-Yami	Saudi Arabia	10.56	Q
12	2	Nazmizan Mohamad	Malaysia	10.57	q
13	3	Kazuhiro Tamura	Japan	10.58	Q
14	4	Hamood Al-Dalhami	Oman	10.63	Q, SB
15	5	Liu Yuan-Kai	Chinese Taipei	10.64	Q
16	4	Kang Tae-Seok	South Korea	10.66	Q
17	1	Sethuwa Nimal Hemantha	Sri Lanka	10.68	Q
18	2	Umaglia Kancanangai Shyam	Singapore	10.72	q
18	3	Chiang Wai Hung	Hong Kong	10.72	Q
20	3	Juma Mubarak Al-Jabri	Oman	10.76	Q, SB
21	1	Tsai Meng-Lin	Chinese Taipei	10.79	Q
21	4	To Wai Lok	Hong Kong	10.79	q
21	3	Vissanu Sophanich	Thailand	10.79	q
24	3	Nguyen Xuan Viet	Vietnam	10.87	PB
25	1	Poh Seng Song	Singapore	10.90	Q
26	2	Umanga Surendra	Sri Lanka	11.00	SB
27	1	Alex Gabito	Philippines	11.03	SB
27	5	Arnold Villarube	Philippines	11.03	SB
29	4	Au Chi Kun	Macau	11.27	SB
30	4	Sykham Silapaseuth	Laos	11.52	PB
31	5	Chaleunsook Adoudomphonh	Laos	11.56	
32	3	Umar Ibrahim	Maldives	11.95	PB
33	4	Mohamed Abu Abdallah	Bangladesh	16.55	SB
	2	Mohamed Masudul Karim	Bangladesh	DNS	
	3	Ali Khamis Al-Neyadi	United Arab Emirates	DNS	
	5	Chhay Lun	Cambodia	DNS	
	5	Salem Al-Qaifi	Yemen	DNS	

=== Quarterfinals ===
Wind: Heat 1: -0.3 m/s, Heat 2: +0.2 m/s, Heat 3: -0.1 m/s

Rank	Heat	Name	Nationality	Time	Notes
1	1	Gennadiy Chernovol	Kazakhstan	10.32	Q
2	1	Adel Mohamed Al-Farhan	Bahrain	10.39	Q
3	1	Abdolghafar Saghar	Iran	10.39	Q
4	2	Salem Al-Yami	Saudi Arabia	10.42	Q
4	3	Chen Haijian	China	10.42	Q
6	3	Shingo Kawabata	Japan	10.43	Q
7	2	Shen Yunbao	China	10.46	Q
8	3	Khalifa Al-Saker	Saudi Arabia	10.50	Q
9	1	Sanjay Ghosh	India	10.52	Q
10	3	Kazuhiro Tamura	Japan	10.53	Q
11	2	Anil Kumar	India	10.55	Q
12	3	Nazmizan Mohamad	Malaysia	10.60	Q
13	1	Kang Tae-Seok	South Korea	10.62	Q
14	1	Hamood Al-Dalhami	Oman	10.65	q
15	2	Sittichai Suwonprateep	Thailand	10.66	Q
16	2	Liu Yuan-Kai	Chinese Taipei	10.67	Q
17	2	Chiang Wai Hung	Hong Kong	10.72	
18	3	Sethuwa Nimal Hemantha	Sri Lanka	10.74	
19	1	To Wai Lok	Hong Kong	10.75	
20	3	Umaglia Kancanangai Shyam	Singapore	10.80	
21	3	Tsai Meng-Lin	Chinese Taipei	10.80	
22	1	Juma Mubarak Al-Jabri	Oman	10.86	
22	2	Poh Seng Song	Singapore	10.86	
24	2	Vissanu Sophanich	Thailand	11.11	

=== Semifinals ===
Wind: Heat 1: +0.8 m/s, Heat 2: 0.0 m/s

Rank	Heat	Name	Nationality	Time	Notes
1	1	Gennadiy Chernovol	Kazakhstan	10.30	Q
2	1	Adel Mohamed Al-Farhan	Bahrain	10.37	Q, PB
2	2	Salem Al-Yami	Saudi Arabia	10.37	Q
4	1	Shingo Kawabata	Japan	10.38	Q
5	2	Chen Haijian	China	10.42	Q
6	2	Abdolghafar Saghar	Iran	10.45	Q
7	2	Shen Yunbao	China	10.50	Q
8	1	Sittichai Suwonprateep	Thailand	10.51	Q
9	1	Anil Kumar	India	10.59	
10	2	Kazuhiro Tamura	Japan	10.60	
11	1	Nazmizan Mohamad	Malaysia	10.64	
12	2	Kang Tae-Seok	South Korea	10.70	
13	1	Liu Yuan-Kai	Chinese Taipei	10.73	
14	2	Sanjay Ghosh	India	10.74	
15	2	Hamood Al-Dalhami	Oman	10.78	
16	1	Khalifa Al-Saker	Saudi Arabia	25.14	

=== Final ===
Wind: 0.0 m/s

Rank	Name	Nationality	Time	Notes
1st place, gold medalist(s)	Chen Haijian	China	10.25	
2nd place, silver medalist(s)	Gennadiy Chernovol	Kazakhstan	10.27	SB
3rd place, bronze medalist(s)	Salem Al-Yami	Saudi Arabia	10.28	
4	Shingo Kawabata	Japan	10.42	
5	Adel Mohamed Al-Farhan	Bahrain	10.43	
6	Sittichai Suwonprateep	Thailand	10.48	
7	Shen Yunbao	China	10.51	
8	Abdolghafar Saghar	Iran	10.55	
