= Athletics at the 1998 Asian Games – Men's 200 metres =

Men's 200 metres at the 1998 Asian Games
- Venue: Thammasat Stadium
- Dates: 17–18 December 1998
- Competitors: 24 from 17 nations

Medalists
gold medal	Koji Ito	Japan
silver medal	Han Chaoming	China
bronze medal	Sugath Thilakaratne	Sri Lanka

The men's 200 metres competition at the 1998 Asian Games in Bangkok, Thailand was held on 17–18 December at the Thammasat Stadium.

== Schedule ==
All times are Indochina Time (UTC+07:00)

Date	Time	Event
Thursday, 17 December 1998	14:50	Heats
Thursday, 17 December 1998	17:00	Semifinals
Friday, 18 December 1998	15:50	Final

== Results ==
Legend

- DNF — Did not finish

=== Heats ===
- Qualification: First 4 in each heat (Q) and the next 4 fastest (q) advance to the semifinals.

==== Heat 1 ====
- Wind: +1.6 m/s

Rank	Athlete	Time	Notes
1	Koji Ito (JPN)	20.84	Q
2	Hamoud Al-Dalhami (OMA)	21.16	Q
3	Ekkachai Janthana (THA)	21.28	Q
4	Yin Hanzhao (CHN)	21.32	Q
5	Md Shafiqul Islam (BAN)	21.69	q
6	Lương Tích Thiện (VIE)	22.04	
7	Ho Kwan Lung (HKG)	22.60	
8	Kong Bona (CAM)	23.00	

==== Heat 2 ====
- Wind: +1.1 m/s

Rank	Athlete	Time	Notes
1	Tao Wu-shiun (TPE)	20.95	Q
2	Mohammed Al-Hooti (OMA)	21.07	Q
3	Saad Muftah Al-Kuwari (QAT)	21.25	Q
4	Worasit Vechaphut (THA)	21.29	Q
5	William To (HKG)	21.44	q
6	Lei Vai Kun (MAC)	22.00	
7	Ram Krishna Chaudhari (NEP)	22.21	
8	Thongdy Amnouayphone (LAO)	22.29	

==== Heat 3 ====
- Wind: +0.6 m/s

Rank	Athlete	Time	Notes
1	Ibrahim Ismail Muftah (QAT)	20.76	Q
2	Sugath Thilakaratne (SRI)	20.81	Q
3	Han Chaoming (CHN)	20.85	Q
4	Gennadiy Chernovol (KAZ)	20.89	Q
5	Hiroyasu Tsuchie (JPN)	21.08	q
6	Mohamed Mahbub Alam (BAN)	21.65	q
7	Mohamed Juma Al-Aswad (UAE)	21.73	
8	Muhammad Riaz (PAK)	22.23	

=== Semifinals ===
- Qualification: First 3 in each heat (Q) and the next 2 fastest (q) advance to the final.

==== Heat 1 ====
- Wind: +0.6 m/s

Rank	Athlete	Time	Notes
1	Ibrahim Ismail Muftah (QAT)	20.66	Q
2	Han Chaoming (CHN)	20.68	Q
3	Sugath Thilakaratne (SRI)	20.69	Q
4	Gennadiy Chernovol (KAZ)	20.70	q
5	Hiroyasu Tsuchie (JPN)	20.98	q
6	Mohammed Al-Hooti (OMA)	21.08	
7	Ekkachai Janthana (THA)	21.37	
8	Md Shafiqul Islam (BAN)	21.85	

==== Heat 2 ====
- Wind: +0.6 m/s

Rank	Athlete	Time	Notes
1	Koji Ito (JPN)	20.41	Q
2	Hamoud Al-Dalhami (OMA)	21.05	Q
3	Tao Wu-shiun (TPE)	21.06	Q
4	Worasit Vechaphut (THA)	21.12	
5	Yin Hanzhao (CHN)	21.17	
6	Saad Muftah Al-Kuwari (QAT)	21.39	
7	William To (HKG)	21.65	
—	Mohamed Mahbub Alam (BAN)	DNF	

=== Final ===
- Wind: −0.4 m/s

Rank	Athlete	Time	Notes
1st place, gold medalist(s)	Koji Ito (JPN)	20.25	GR
2nd place, silver medalist(s)	Han Chaoming (CHN)	20.70	
3rd place, bronze medalist(s)	Sugath Thilakaratne (SRI)	20.83	
4	Gennadiy Chernovol (KAZ)	20.84	
5	Ibrahim Ismail Muftah (QAT)	20.90	
6	Tao Wu-shiun (TPE)	21.16	
7	Hamoud Al-Dalhami (OMA)	21.18	
8	Hiroyasu Tsuchie (JPN)	21.31	
