= Athletics at the 2001 Summer Universiade – Men's 100 metres =

The men's 100 metres event at the 2001 Summer Universiade was held at the Workers Stadium in Beijing, China on 27–28 August.

== Medalists ==
| Gold | Silver | Bronze |
|---|---|---|
| Marcus Brunson; United States | Gennadiy Chernovol; Kazakhstan | Chris Lambert; Great Britain |

== Results ==
=== Heats ===
Wind:
Heat 1: +0.8 m/s, Heat 2: +0.4 m/s, Heat 3: 0.0 m/s, Heat 4: +1.2 m/s, Heat 5: +1.3 m/s, Heat 6: 0.0 m/s, Heat 7: +0.2 m/s, Heat 8: +1.1 m/s, Heat 9: +1.8 m/s, Heat 10: 0.0 m/s

| Rank | Heat | Athlete | Nationality | Time | Notes |
|---|---|---|---|---|---|
| 1 | 4 | Jérôme Éyana | France | 10.25 | Q, PB |
| 2 | 7 | Marcus Brunson | United States | 10.31 | Q |
| 3 | 10 | Chris Lambert | Great Britain | 10.32 | Q |
| 4 | 5 | Chen Haijian | China | 10.34 | Q |
| 4 | 6 | Gennadiy Chernovol | Kazakhstan | 10.34 | Q |
| 6 | 1 | David Baxter | Australia | 10.36 | Q |
| 6 | 1 | Juan Pita | Cuba | 10.36 | Q |
| 6 | 4 | Gideon Jablonka | Israel | 10.36 | Q |
| 9 | 6 | Cláudio Roberto Souza | Brazil | 10.37 | Q |
| 9 | 9 | Umaglia Kancanangai Shyam | Singapore | 10.37 | Q, NR |
| 9 | 9 | Sherwin Vries | Namibia | 10.37 | Q |
| 12 | 8 | Benedictus Botha | Namibia | 10.38 | Q |
| 13 | 9 | Shingo Kawabata | Japan | 10.39 | Q |
| 14 | 5 | Martijn Ungerer | Netherlands | 10.40 | Q |
| 15 | 8 | Diego Moisés Santos | Spain | 10.43 | Q |
| 16 | 4 | Jesús Carrión | Puerto Rico | 10.44 | Q |
| 17 | 3 | Roger Angouono-Moke | Congo | 10.45 | Q |
| 18 | 3 | Corné du Plessis | South Africa | 10.47 | Q |
| 18 | 7 | Idrissa Sanou | Burkina Faso | 10.47 | Q |
| 20 | 3 | Oliver König | Germany | 10.48 | Q |
| 20 | 4 | Sergey Bychkov | Russia | 10.48 | q |
| 20 | 8 | Gerald Williams | United States | 10.48 | Q |
| 20 | 10 | Wang Peng | China | 10.48 | Q |
| 24 | 1 | Virgil Spier | Netherlands | 10.49 | Q |
| 24 | 6 | Adam Basil | Australia | 10.49 | Q |
| 26 | 3 | Andrea Colombo | Italy | 10.52 | q |
| 27 | 10 | Aleksandr Smirnov | Russia | 10.53 | Q |
| 28 | 2 | Tsai Meng-lin | Chinese Taipei | 10.54 | Q |
| 28 | 5 | Andrea Rabino | Italy | 10.54 | Q |
| 30 | 6 | Kenji Nara | Japan | 10.57 | |
| 31 | 3 | Fabrice Calligny | France | 10.58 | |
| 31 | 7 | Kongdech Natenee | Thailand | 10.58 | Q |
| 33 | 2 | Tommy Kafri | Israel | 10.59 | Q |
| 34 | 5 | Vissanu Sophanich | Thailand | 10.60 | |
| 35 | 1 | Jarek Kulesza | Canada | 10.67 | |
| 36 | 6 | Marc Schneeberger | Switzerland | 10.67 | |
| 36 | 6 | Rok Predanič | Slovenia | 10.67 | |
| 38 | 9 | Dmitrijs Hadakovs | Latvia | 10.71 | |
| 39 | 4 | Diego Ferreira | Paraguay | 10.74 | |
| 40 | 2 | Lee Prowell | Guyana | 10.79 | Q |
| 40 | 5 | Sidiki Aboubakar | Cameroon | 10.79 | |
| 42 | 7 | Felix Okello | Uganda | 10.81 | |
| 43 | 2 | Fernando dos Reis | Brazil | 10.82 | |
| 44 | 7 | Rika Fardani | Indonesia | 10.83 | |
| 44 | 10 | DeVon Bean | Bermuda | 10.83 | |
| 46 | 3 | Issa Kebe | Senegal | 10.96 | |
| 47 | 5 | Sachin Navle | India | 11.00 | |
| 48 | 8 | Ho Kwan Lung | Hong Kong | 11.01 | |
| 49 | 4 | Alieu Conteh | Sierra Leone | 11.03 | |
| 50 | 7 | Lan Ming Tak | Hong Kong | 11.04 | |
| 51 | 4 | Karl Farrugia | Malta | 11.07 | |
| 52 | 1 | Iosefo Vuloaloa | Fiji | 11.08 | |
| 53 | 1 | Leisner Aragón | Colombia | 11.10 | |
| 54 | 8 | Alfred Engone | Gabon | 11.13 | |
| 55 | 6 | Vadims Avdejevs | Latvia | 11.19 | |
| 56 | 10 | Mohamed Al-Shikeili | Oman | 11.23 | |
| 57 | 3 | Roberto Gómez | Costa Rica | 11.25 | |
| 58 | 9 | Lei Ka In | Macau | 11.31 | |
| 59 | 8 | Mohamed Basheer | Iraq | 11.33 | |
| 60 | 4 | Pablo Moura | Peru | 11.45 | |
| 61 | 10 | Ali Mohamed Foudhe | Comoros | 11.45 | |
| 62 | 9 | Michael Banda | Malawi | 11.47 | |
| 63 | 6 | Afif Hass | Yemen | 11.50 | |
| 64 | 8 | Alnobi Al-Kiyumi | Oman | 11.53 | |
| 65 | 10 | Roberto Salvatierra | Peru | 11.55 | |
| 66 | 7 | Sergio Mba Nsono | Equatorial Guinea | 11.59 | |
| 66 | 9 | Abaker Mohamed | Sudan | 11.59 | |
| 68 | 2 | Leong Kin Kuan | Macau | 11.64 | |
| 69 | 9 | Sam Daraphirith | Cambodia | 11.73 | |
| 70 | 1 | Zeyad Abueshabieh | Jordan | 11.86 | |
| 71 | 5 | Erwin Alex | Federated States of Micronesia | 11.91 | |
| 72 | 10 | El Ottambot | Gabon | 11.98 | |
| 73 | 2 | Ervin Pupe | Albania | 14.12 | |
| 74 | 1 | Soleymane Balde | Guinea | 14.41 | |
| 75 | 7 | Abdolaye Barry | Guinea | 14.97 | |

=== Quarterfinals ===
Wind:
Heat 1: -2.1 m/s, Heat 2: -1.0 m/s, Heat 3: -0.8 m/s, Heat 4: ? m/s (N.B. wind assisted)

| Rank | Heat | Athlete | Nationality | Time | Notes |
|---|---|---|---|---|---|
| 1 | 2 | Marcus Brunson | United States | 10.23 | Q |
| 2 | 1 | Chris Lambert | Great Britain | 10.37 | Q |
| 3 | 3 | Gennadiy Chernovol | Kazakhstan | 10.38 | Q |
| 4 | 3 | Cláudio Roberto Souza | Brazil | 10.42 | Q |
| 5 | 1 | Juan Pita | Cuba | 10.43 | Q |
| 6 | 4 | Jérôme Éyana | France | 10.45 | Q |
| 7 | 2 | Idrissa Sanou | Burkina Faso | 10.47 | Q |
| 7 | 3 | Chen Haijian | China | 10.47 | Q |
| 7 | 4 | Corné du Plessis | South Africa | 10.47 | Q |
| 10 | 2 | Martijn Ungerer | Netherlands | 10.50 | Q |
| 11 | 1 | David Baxter | Australia | 10.51 | Q |
| 12 | 1 | Sherwin Vries | Namibia | 10.52 | Q |
| 12 | 2 | Umaglia Kancanangai Shyam | Singapore | 10.52 | Q |
| 12 | 4 | Benedictus Botha | Namibia | 10.52 | Q |
| 12 | 4 | Andrea Colombo | Italy | 10.52 | Q |
| 16 | 1 | Jesús Carrión | Puerto Rico | 10.53 | |
| 16 | 3 | Shingo Kawabata | Japan | 10.53 | Q |
| 18 | 4 | Virgil Spier | Netherlands | 10.54 | |
| 19 | 3 | Oliver König | Germany | 10.56 | |
| 20 | 2 | Adam Basil | Australia | 10.58 | |
| 20 | 4 | Diego Moisés Santos | Spain | 10.58 | |
| 22 | 4 | Gerald Williams | United States | 10.60 | |
| 23 | 2 | Sergey Bychkov | Russia | 10.61 | |
| 24 | 1 | Wang Peng | China | 10.62 | |
| 25 | 2 | Tommy Kafri | Israel | 10.63 | |
| 25 | 2 | Tsai Meng-lin | Chinese Taipei | 10.63 | |
| 25 | 4 | Roger Angouono-Moke | Congo | 10.63 | |
| 28 | 3 | Gideon Jablonka | Israel | 10.69 | |
| 29 | 1 | Aleksandr Smirnov | Russia | 10.70 | |
| 30 | 3 | Andrea Rabino | Italy | 10.71 | |
| 31 | 3 | Kongdech Natenee | Thailand | 10.72 | |
| 32 | 1 | Lee Prowell | Guyana | 11.06 | |

=== Semifinals ===
Wind:
Heat 1: +1.5 m/s, Heat 2: -0.7 m/s

| Rank | Heat | Athlete | Nationality | Time | Notes |
|---|---|---|---|---|---|
| 1 | 1 | Marcus Brunson | United States | 10.21 | Q |
| 2 | 1 | Jérôme Éyana | France | 10.28 | Q |
| 3 | 2 | Chris Lambert | Great Britain | 10.32 | Q |
| 4 | 2 | Gennadiy Chernovol | Kazakhstan | 10.32 | Q |
| 5 | 2 | Juan Pita | Cuba | 10.33 | Q |
| 6 | 1 | Cláudio Roberto Souza | Brazil | 10.37 | Q |
| 7 | 1 | Corné du Plessis | South Africa | 10.39 | Q |
| 8 | 1 | Benedictus Botha | Namibia | 10.40 | |
| 9 | 1 | Chen Haijian | China | 10.41 | |
| 10 | 1 | Shingo Kawabata | Japan | 10.43 | |
| 11 | 2 | Andrea Colombo | Italy | 10.45 | Q |
| 12 | 2 | Sherwin Vries | Namibia | 10.46 | |
| 13 | 2 | David Baxter | Australia | 10.51 | |
| 14 | 2 | Martijn Ungerer | Netherlands | 10.54 | |
| 15 | 2 | Idrissa Sanou | Burkina Faso | 10.55 | |
| | 1 | Umaglia Kancanangai Shyam | Singapore | DNS | |

=== Final ===
Wind: -0.9 m/s

| Rank | Athlete | Nationality | Time | Notes |
|---|---|---|---|---|
| 1st place, gold medalist(s) | Marcus Brunson | United States | 10.15 | |
| 2nd place, silver medalist(s) | Gennadiy Chernovol | Kazakhstan | 10.29 | |
| 3rd place, bronze medalist(s) | Chris Lambert | Great Britain | 10.38 | |
| 4 | Juan Pita | Cuba | 10.42 | |
| 5 | Cláudio Roberto Souza | Brazil | 10.44 | |
| 6 | Jérôme Éyana | France | 10.44 | |
| 7 | Corné du Plessis | South Africa | 10.54 | |
| 8 | Andrea Colombo | Italy | 10.57 | |
