= Athletics at the 2001 Summer Universiade – Men's 200 metres =

The men's 200 metres event at the 2001 Summer Universiade was held at the Workers Stadium in Beijing, China on 30–31 August.

== Medalists ==
Gold	Silver	Bronze
Marcin Urbaś; Poland	Gennadiy Chernovol; Kazakhstan	Corné du Plessis; South Africa

== Results ==
=== Heats ===
Wind:
Heat 1: +1.7 m/s, Heat 2: ? m/s, Heat 3: +0.2 m/s, Heat 4: 0.0 m/s, Heat 5: 0.0 m/s, Heat 6: -0.1 m/s, Heat 7: ? m/s, Heat 8: +1.1 m/s

Rank	Heat	Athlete	Nationality	Time	Notes
1	1	Gennadiy Chernovol	Kazakhstan	20.82	Q
2	4	Chris Lambert	Great Britain	20.84	Q
3	3	Xu Zizhou	China	20.86	Q
4	5	Marcin Urbaś	Poland	20.92	Q
5	1	Tim Williams	Australia	20.96	Q
6	6	Sherwin Vries	Namibia	20.99	Q
7	1	Yusuke Omae	Japan	21.00	Q
8	2	Josephus Howard	United States	21.01	Q
9	2	Mark Howard	Ireland	21.02	Q
9	8	Corné du Plessis	South Africa	21.02	Q
9	8	Masayuki Okusako	Japan	21.02	Q
12	7	Juan Pedro Toledo	Mexico	21.05	Q
13	3	Gideon Jablonka	Israel	21.10	Q
14	3	Kaaron Conwright	United States	21.14	Q
15	1	Tsai Meng-lin	Chinese Taipei	21.15	q
15	5	José Carlos Peña	Cuba	21.15	Q
17	3	Virgil Spier	Netherlands	21.17	q, PB
18	2	Oleg Sergeyev	Russia	21.25	Q
18	6	Tommy Kafri	Israel	21.25	Q
20	5	David Flowers	Australia	21.26	Q
21	6	Fernando dos Reis	Brazil	21.47	Q
22	7	Marc Schneeberger	Switzerland	21.52	Q
22	8	Paul McKee	Ireland	21.52	Q
24	4	Massimiliano Donati	Italy	21.55	Q
25	5	Chinedu Ike	Nigeria	21.56	q
26	8	Yang Yaozu	China	21.60	q
27	3	Dmitrijs Hadakovs	Latvia	21.62	q
28	4	Thobias Akwenye	Namibia	21.63	Q
29	4	Tony Ogbu	Nigeria	21.65	q
30	5	Rika Fardani	Indonesia	21.83	q
31	7	Lei Wai Kun	Macau	21.85	Q
32	6	Ho Kwan Lung	Hong Kong	21.96	q
33	3	Dmitriy Chumichkin	Azerbaijan	22.02	
34	2	Vadims Avdejevs	Latvia	22.09	
35	6	Diego Ferreira	Paraguay	22.15	
36	5	Alieu Conteh	Sierra Leone	22.31	
37	8	Sidiki Aboubakar	Cameroon	22.44	
38	1	Karl Farrugia	Malta	22.47	
39	2	Roberto Gómez	Costa Rica	22.65	
39	4	Lan Ming Tak	Hong Kong	22.65	
41	7	Lee Prowell	Guyana	22.66	
42	6	Afif Hass	Yemen	22.87	
43	6	Said Al-Abadi	Oman	22.91	
44	2	Ekkachai Janthana	Thailand	22.97	
45	7	Pablo Moura	Peru	23.16	
46	7	Chadana Wickramarachchi	Sri Lanka	23.20	
47	8	Ali Mohamed Foudhe	Comoros	23.29	
48	3	Roberto Salvatierra	Peru	23.52	
49	1	Chong Ka Man	Macau	23.69	
50	6	Sam Daraphirith	Cambodia	23.81	
51	1	Zeyad Abueshabieh	Jordan	23.92	
52	4	Edward Grech	Malta	23.99	
53	5	El Ottambot	Gabon	24.43	
54	7	Habib Sylla	Guinea	26.45	
	8	Aleksandr Ryabov	Russia	DNF	

=== Quarterfinals ===
Wind:
Heat 1: +0.8 m/s, Heat 2: +1.4 m/s, Heat 3: +0.2 m/s, Heat 4: -0.3 m/s

Rank	Heat	Athlete	Nationality	Time	Notes
1	2	Corné du Plessis	South Africa	20.63	Q
2	1	Marcin Urbaś	Poland	20.66	Q
3	4	Xu Zizhou	China	20.74	Q
4	4	Josephus Howard	United States	20.79	Q
5	1	Sherwin Vries	Namibia	20.81	Q
5	1	José Carlos Peña	Cuba	20.81	Q
7	3	Gennadiy Chernovol	Kazakhstan	20.82	Q
8	2	Chris Lambert	Great Britain	20.87	Q
9	2	Mark Howard	Ireland	20.88	Q
10	2	Kaaron Conwright	United States	20.92	Q
11	4	Masayuki Okusako	Japan	20.93	Q
12	3	Juan Pedro Toledo	Mexico	20.95	Q
13	4	Oleg Sergeyev	Russia	21.01	Q
14	3	Tim Williams	Australia	21.05	Q
15	3	Yusuke Omae	Japan	21.06	Q
16	4	Tommy Kafri	Israel	21.14	
17	1	Gideon Jablonka	Israel	21.18	Q
17	1	Fernando dos Reis	Brazil	21.18	
19	2	Virgil Spier	Netherlands	21.18	
20	1	David Flowers	Australia	21.21	
20	2	Marc Schneeberger	Switzerland	21.21	
22	3	Tsai Meng-lin	Chinese Taipei	21.32	
23	4	Paul McKee	Ireland	21.42	
24	3	Massimiliano Donati	Italy	21.45	
25	4	Tony Ogbu	Nigeria	21.57	
26	3	Chinedu Ike	Nigeria	21.60	
27	3	Lei Wai Kun	Macau	21.63	
28	1	Yang Yaozu	China	21.67	
29	2	Thobias Akwenye	Namibia	21.69	
30	1	Dmitrijs Hadakovs	Latvia	21.70	
31	4	Ho Kwan Lung	Hong Kong	22.13	
	2	Rika Fardani	Indonesia	?	

=== Semifinals ===
Wind:
Heat 1: +2.7 m/s, Heat 2: +1.5 m/s

Rank	Heat	Athlete	Nationality	Time	Notes
1	1	Xu Zizhou	China	20.39	Q
2	1	Marcin Urbaś	Poland	20.39	Q
3	2	Gennadiy Chernovol	Kazakhstan	20.47	Q
4	1	Sherwin Vries	Namibia	20.53	Q
5	2	Corné du Plessis	South Africa	20.61	Q
6	1	Kaaron Conwright	United States	20.71	Q
7	2	Masayuki Okusako	Japan	20.81	Q
8	1	Chris Lambert	Great Britain	20.86	
9	2	Josephus Howard	United States	20.91	Q
10	1	Mark Howard	Ireland	20.95	
11	1	Yusuke Omae	Japan	21.05	
12	1	Oleg Sergeyev	Russia	21.08	
13	2	José Carlos Peña	Cuba	21.09	
14	2	Gideon Jablonka	Israel	21.09	
15	2	Tim Williams	Australia	21.15	
16	2	Juan Pedro Toledo	Mexico	21.20	

=== Final ===
Rank	Athlete	Nationality	Time	Notes
1st place, gold medalist(s)	Marcin Urbaś	Poland	20.56	
2nd place, silver medalist(s)	Gennadiy Chernovol	Kazakhstan	20.57	
3rd place, bronze medalist(s)	Corné du Plessis	South Africa	20.58	
4	Xu Zizhou	China	20.70	
5	Sherwin Vries	Namibia	20.75	
6	Masayuki Okusako	Japan	20.99	
7	Josephus Howard	United States	21.10	
8	Kaaron Conwright	United States	21.38	
