= Athletics at the 2002 Asian Games – Men's 200 metres =

Men's 200 metres at the 2002 Asian Games
- Venue: Busan Asiad Main Stadium
- Dates: 9–10 October 2002
- Competitors: 19 from 12 nations

Medalists
| gold medal | Shingo Suetsugu | Japan |
| silver medal | Gennadiy Chernovol | Kazakhstan |
| bronze medal | Yang Yaozu | China |

The men's 200 metres competition at the 2002 Asian Games in Busan, South Korea was held on 9–10 October at the Busan Asiad Main Stadium.

== Schedule ==
All times are Korea Standard Time (UTC+09:00)

| Date | Time | Event |
|---|---|---|
| Wednesday, 9 October 2002 | 10:00 | 1st round |
| Wednesday, 9 October 2002 | 16:10 | Semifinals |
| Thursday, 10 October 2002 | 11:00 | Final |

== Records ==
Prior to this competition, the existing world, Asian and Games records were as follows.

| World Record | Michael Johnson (USA) | 19.32 | Atlanta, United States | 1 August 1996 |
| Asian Record | Koji Ito (JPN) | 20.16 | Kumamoto, Japan | 2 October 1998 |
| Games Record | Koji Ito (JPN) | 20.25 | Bangkok, Thailand | 18 December 1998 |

== Results ==
Legend

- DNS — Did not start

=== 1st round ===
- Qualification: First 4 in each heat (Q) and the next 4 fastest (q) advance to the semifinals.

==== Heat 1 ====
- Wind: +0.3 m/s

| Rank | Athlete | Time | Notes |
|---|---|---|---|
| 1 | Shingo Suetsugu (JPN) | 20.97 | Q |
| 2 | Sittichai Suwonprateep (THA) | 21.26 | Q |
| 3 | Ahmed Al-Dossari (KSA) | 21.34 | Q |
| 4 | Hamoud Al-Dalhami (OMA) | 21.63 | Q |
| 5 | Jeon Duk-hyung (KOR) | 21.71 | q |
| 6 | Azmi Ibrahim (MAS) | 22.87 | |

==== Heat 2 ====
- Wind: +0.3 m/s

| Rank | Athlete | Time | Notes |
|---|---|---|---|
| 1 | Yang Yaozu (CHN) | 21.01 | Q |
| 2 | Fawzi Al-Shammari (KUW) | 21.24 | Q |
| 3 | Hisashi Miyazaki (JPN) | 21.48 | Q |
| 4 | Ekkachai Janthana (THA) | 21.51 | Q |
| 5 | Anand Menezes (IND) | 21.53 | q |
| 6 | Nazmizan Mohamad (MAS) | 21.76 | q |
| 7 | Lee Kwang-pil (KOR) | 21.82 | q |

==== Heat 3 ====
- Wind: −0.2 m/s

| Rank | Athlete | Time | Notes |
|---|---|---|---|
| 1 | Xu Zizhou (CHN) | 20.98 | Q |
| 2 | Gennadiy Chernovol (KAZ) | 21.01 | Q |
| 3 | Hamed Al-Bishi (KSA) | 21.15 | Q |
| 4 | Mohammed Al-Hooti (OMA) | 21.43 | Q |
| 5 | Chao Un Kei (MAC) | 22.92 | |
| — | U. K. Shyam (SIN) | DNS | |

=== Semifinals ===
- Qualification: First 4 in each heat (Q) advance to the final.

==== Heat 1 ====
- Wind: +1.4 m/s

| Rank | Athlete | Time | Notes |
|---|---|---|---|
| 1 | Shingo Suetsugu (JPN) | 20.45 | Q |
| 2 | Yang Yaozu (CHN) | 20.78 | Q |
| 3 | Fawzi Al-Shammari (KUW) | 21.01 | Q |
| 4 | Hamoud Al-Dalhami (OMA) | 21.26 | Q |
| 5 | Ahmed Al-Dossari (KSA) | 21.39 | |
| 6 | Ekkachai Janthana (THA) | 21.48 | |
| 7 | Lee Kwang-pil (KOR) | 21.73 | |
| 8 | Anand Menezes (IND) | 21.77 | |

==== Heat 2 ====
- Wind: +0.8 m/s

| Rank | Athlete | Time | Notes |
|---|---|---|---|
| 1 | Gennadiy Chernovol (KAZ) | 20.71 | Q |
| 2 | Sittichai Suwonprateep (THA) | 20.83 | Q |
| 3 | Xu Zizhou (CHN) | 20.92 | Q |
| 4 | Hamed Al-Bishi (KSA) | 21.04 | Q |
| 5 | Hisashi Miyazaki (JPN) | 21.07 | |
| 6 | Mohammed Al-Hooti (OMA) | 21.59 | |
| 7 | Nazmizan Mohamad (MAS) | 21.60 | |
| 8 | Jeon Duk-hyung (KOR) | 21.66 | |

=== Final ===
- Wind: 0.0 m/s

| Rank | Athlete | Time | Notes |
|---|---|---|---|
| 1st place, gold medalist(s) | Shingo Suetsugu (JPN) | 20.38 | |
| 2nd place, silver medalist(s) | Gennadiy Chernovol (KAZ) | 20.57 | |
| 3rd place, bronze medalist(s) | Yang Yaozu (CHN) | 20.58 | |
| 4 | Fawzi Al-Shammari (KUW) | 20.73 | |
| 5 | Xu Zizhou (CHN) | 20.77 | |
| 6 | Sittichai Suwonprateep (THA) | 20.79 | |
| 7 | Hamed Al-Bishi (KSA) | 21.10 | |
| 8 | Hamoud Al-Dalhami (OMA) | 21.25 | |
