= Athletics at the 1998 Asian Games – Men's 100 metres =

Men's 100 metres at the 1998 Asian Games
- Venue: Thammasat Stadium
- Dates: 13–14 December 1998
- Competitors: 25 from 19 nations

Medalists
gold medal	Koji Ito	Japan
silver medal	Reanchai Seeharwong	Thailand
bronze medal	Yasukatsu Otsuki	Japan

The men's 100 metres competition at the 1998 Asian Games in Bangkok, Thailand was held on 13–14 December at the Thammasat Stadium.

== Schedule ==
All times are Indochina Time (UTC+07:00)

Date	Time	Event
Sunday, 13 December 1998	14:30	Heats
Sunday, 13 December 1998	16:50	Semifinals
Monday, 14 December 1998	16:15	Final

== Results ==
=== Heats ===
- Qualification: First 3 in each heat (Q) and the next 4 fastest (q) advance to the semifinals.

==== Heat 1 ====
- Wind: +2.8 m/s

Rank	Athlete	Time	Notes
1	Koji Ito (JPN)	10.03	Q
2	Gennadiy Chernovol (KAZ)	10.40	Q
3	Saad Muftah Al-Kuwari (QAT)	10.49	Q
4	Tao Wu-shiun (TPE)	10.50	q
5	Chiang Wai Hung (HKG)	10.63	q
6	Lương Tích Thiện (VIE)	10.67	q
7	Mohammed Al-Maskari (OMA)	10.72	

==== Heat 2 ====
- Wind: +2.5 m/s

Rank	Athlete	Time	Notes
1	Yasukatsu Otsuki (JPN)	10.33	Q
2	Lin Wei (CHN)	10.39	Q
3	Vissanu Sophanich (THA)	10.47	Q
4	Md Shafiqul Islam (BAN)	10.79	
5	Mohamed Juma Al-Aswad (UAE)	10.81	
6	Kong Bona (CAM)	11.31	

==== Heat 3 ====
- Wind: +2.4 m/s

Rank	Athlete	Time	Notes
1	Watson Nyambek (MAS)	10.25	Q
2	Vitaliy Medvedev (KAZ)	10.30	Q
3	William To (HKG)	10.50	Q
4	Mohamed Mahbub Alam (BAN)	10.66	q
5	Ram Krishna Chaudhari (NEP)	10.84	
6	Thongdy Amnouayphone (LAO)	11.10	

==== Heat 4 ====
- Wind: +3.1 m/s

Rank	Athlete	Time	Notes
1	Chintaka de Zoysa (SRI)	10.28	Q
2	Reanchai Seeharwong (THA)	10.28	Q
3	Zhou Wei (CHN)	10.28	Q
4	Muhammad Riaz (PAK)	10.95	
5	Mohammad Chaaban (LIB)	11.37	
6	Aleksandr Kozlov (TJK)	12.17	

=== Semifinals ===
- Qualification: First 3 in each heat (Q) and the next 2 fastest (q) advance to the final.

==== Heat 1 ====
- Wind: +2.4 m/s

Rank	Athlete	Time	Notes
1	Watson Nyambek (MAS)	10.20	Q
2	Yasukatsu Otsuki (JPN)	10.31	Q
3	Chintaka de Zoysa (SRI)	10.34	Q
4	Lin Wei (CHN)	10.42	
5	Vissanu Sophanich (THA)	10.46	
6	Saad Muftah Al-Kuwari (QAT)	10.54	
7	Chiang Wai Hung (HKG)	10.67	
8	Mohamed Mahbub Alam (BAN)	10.82	

==== Heat 2 ====
- Wind: +1.9 m/s

Rank	Athlete	Time	Notes
1	Koji Ito (JPN)	10.00	Q, AR
2	Reanchai Seeharwong (THA)	10.23	Q
3	Vitaliy Medvedev (KAZ)	10.31	Q
4	Zhou Wei (CHN)	10.34	q
5	Gennadiy Chernovol (KAZ)	10.36	q
6	Tao Wu-shiun (TPE)	10.41	
7	William To (HKG)	10.54	
8	Lương Tích Thiện (VIE)	10.66	

=== Final ===
- Wind: +1.6 m/s

Rank	Athlete	Time	Notes
1st place, gold medalist(s)	Koji Ito (JPN)	10.05	
2nd place, silver medalist(s)	Reanchai Seeharwong (THA)	10.31	
3rd place, bronze medalist(s)	Yasukatsu Otsuki (JPN)	10.31	
4	Watson Nyambek (MAS)	10.32	
5	Chintaka de Zoysa (SRI)	10.39	
6	Vitaliy Medvedev (KAZ)	10.40	
7	Gennadiy Chernovol (KAZ)	10.41	
8	Zhou Wei (CHN)	10.42	
