= Hiroyasu Tsuchie =

Japanese sprinter

Personal information
- Nationality: Japanese
- Born: 14 June 1974 (age 52) Izumo, Shimane, Japan
- Education: Waseda University
- Height: 1.71 m (5 ft 7 in)
- Weight: 65 kg (143 lb)

Sport
- Country: Japan
- Sport: Track and field
- Event: 100 metres
- Retired: 2006
- Now coaching: Yoshihide Kiryu

Achievements and titles
- Personal best(s): 100 m: 10.21 (2004); 200 m: 20.86 (2003)
Medal record
Men's athletics
Representing Japan
Asian Games
Gold medal – first place	1998 Bangkok	4×100 m relay
Silver medal – second place	2002 Busan	4×100 m relay
Asian Championships
Silver medal – second place	1998 Fukuoka	4×100 m relay
Bronze medal – third place	1998 Fukuoka	200 m

Hiroyasu Tsuchie (土江 寛裕, Tsuchie Hiroyasu; born 14 June 1974 in present-day Izumo, Shimane) is a coach and retired Japanese sprinter.

== Coaching career ==
He has been the Strengthening Committee Member of the Japan Association of Athletics Federations since 2007.

=== University coaching career ===
- Josai University - Director ( - 2014)
- Toyo University - Sprint coach (2014–present)

He is currently the sprint coach of the track and field club at Toyo University. He was previously the director of the track and field club at Josai University.

Notable Toyo University athletes trained by Hiroyasu Tsuchie include:

- Yoshihide Kiryu - He still trains with Tsuchie.
- Julian Walsh

=== Coaching honors ===
- Mizuno Sports Mentor Award - Silver Award 2017

== Personal life ==
His father Ryokichi Tsuchie is the 1965 Japanese Championships champion in the 200 metres.

== Competition record ==
Year	Competition	Venue	Position	Event	Notes
Representing Japan
1995	Universiade	Fukuoka, Japan	6th	4 × 100 m relay	40.37
1996	Olympic Games	Atlanta, United States	66th (h)	100 m	10.58
1996	Olympic Games	Atlanta, United States	–	4 × 100 m relay	DQ
1997	World Championships	Athens, Greece	37th (qf)	100 m	10.38
1997	World Championships	Athens, Greece	11th (sf)	4 × 100 m relay	38.89
1998	Asian Championships	Fukuoka, Japan	3rd	100 m	10.44
1998	Asian Championships	Fukuoka, Japan	2nd	4 × 100 m relay	39.30
1998	Asian Games	Bangkok, Thailand	8th	200 m	21.31
1998	Asian Games	Bangkok, Thailand	1st	4 × 100 m relay	38.91
2001	World Championships	Edmonton, Canada	44th (h)	100 m	10.54
2002	Asian Championships	Colombo, Sri Lanka	4th	100 m	10.62
2002	Asian Championships	Colombo, Sri Lanka	4th	4 × 100 m relay	39.41
2002	Asian Games	Busan, South Korea	2nd	4 × 100 m relay	38.90
2003	World Championships	Paris, France	6th	4 × 100 m relay	39.05
2004	Olympic Games	Athens, Greece	39th (h)	100 m	10.37
2004	Olympic Games	Athens, Greece	4th	4 × 100 m relay	38.49

== National titles ==
- Japanese Championships
  - 100 metres: 1999
  - 200 metres: 1998

== Personal bests ==
- 100 metres - 10.21 s (+1.0 m/s) (Tottori 2004)
- 100 metres - 10.09 s (+3.3 m/s) (Shizuoka 1999): Wind-assisted
- 200 metres - 20.86 s (0.0 m/s) (Fujiyoshida 2003)
- 200 metres - 20.86 s (+0.7 m/s) (Okayama 2003)
- 4×100 metres relay - 38.31 s (3rd leg) (Athens 1997): Former Asian and Japanese record
