= 2001 IAAF World Indoor Championships – Men's 200 metres =

The men's 200 metres event at the 2001 IAAF World Indoor Championships was held on March 9–10.

== Medalists ==
Gold	Silver	Bronze
Shawn Crawford; United States	Christian Malcolm; Great Britain	Patrick van Balkom; Netherlands

== Results ==
=== Heats ===
The winner of each heat (Q) and next 6 fastest (q) qualified for the semifinals.

Rank	Heat	Name	Nationality	Time	Notes
1	2	Shawn Crawford	United States	20.86	Q
1	3	Christopher Williams	Jamaica	20.86	Q
3	1	Patrick van Balkom	Netherlands	20.90	Q
4	1	Allyn Condon	Great Britain	20.93	q
5	6	Christian Malcolm	Great Britain	21.05	Q
6	5	Kevin Little	United States	21.09	Q
7	4	Radek Zachoval	Czech Republic	21.16	Q
8	4	Joseph Batangdon	Cameroon	21.21	q
9	6	Oumar Loum	Senegal	21.22	q
10	2	Gennadiy Chernovol	Kazakhstan	21.23	q, PB
10	3	Alessandro Attene	Italy	21.23	q
12	5	Massimiliano Donati	Italy	21.35	q
13	2	Oleg Sergeyev	Russia	21.50	
14	5	Dominic Demeritte	Bahamas	21.52	
15	6	Heber Viera	Uruguay	21.55	
16	1	Ricardo Alves	Portugal	21.83	
17	5	Chen Tien-Wen	Chinese Taipei	21.88	
18	3	Enefiok Udo-Obong	Nigeria	21.96	
19	6	Sayon Cooper	Liberia	21.98	
20	3	Hamood Al-Dalhami	Oman	21.99	
21	2	Alieu Kamara	Sierra Leone	22.26	
22	1	Angelo Edmund	Panama	22.34	
	4	Ommanandsingh Kowlessur	Mauritius	DQ	
	4	Denis Daniel Gutierrez	Nicaragua	DNS	

=== Semifinals ===
First 2 of each semifinal (Q) qualified directly for the final.

Rank	Heat	Name	Nationality	Time	Notes
1	3	Kevin Little	United States	20.73	Q
2	1	Christian Malcolm	Great Britain	20.76	Q
3	1	Patrick van Balkom	Netherlands	20.77	Q, NR
4	3	Christopher Williams	Jamaica	20.78	Q
5	2	Shawn Crawford	United States	20.80	Q
6	2	Allyn Condon	Great Britain	21.12	Q
7	2	Radek Zachoval	Czech Republic	21.17	
8	1	Gennadiy Chernovol	Kazakhstan	21.28	
9	3	Joseph Batangdon	Cameroon	21.43	
10	1	Oumar Loum	Senegal	21.49	
10	3	Alessandro Attene	Italy	21.49	
12	2	Massimiliano Donati	Italy	21.97	

=== Final ===
Rank	Name	Nationality	Time	Notes
1st place, gold medalist(s)	Shawn Crawford	United States	20.63	
2nd place, silver medalist(s)	Christian Malcolm	Great Britain	20.76	
3rd place, bronze medalist(s)	Patrick van Balkom	Netherlands	20.96	
4	Christopher Williams	Jamaica	21.12	
5	Allyn Condon	Great Britain	21.69	
	Kevin Little	United States	DNS	
