= Athletics at the 2002 Asian Games =

- Venue: Busan Asiad Main Stadium
- Dates: 7–14 October 2002
- Competitors: 459 from 39 nations

Athletics was contested from October 7 to October 14 at the 2002 Asian Games in Busan Asiad Main Stadium, Busan, South Korea. A total of 459 athletes from 39 nations took part in the competition. Afghanistan, Bhutan, Brunei, Laos and Maldives were the only nations without a representative in the events.

== Schedule ==
●	1st day	●	Final day	H	Heats	S	Semifinals	F	Final

Event↓/Date →	7th Mon	8th Tue		9th Wed		10th Thu	11th Fri	12th Sat	13th Sun	14th Mon
Men's 100 m	H	S	F							
Men's 200 m				H	S	F				
Men's 400 m	H	S		F						
Men's 800 m		H		F						
Men's 1500 m								F		
Men's 5000 m						F				
Men's 10,000 m	F									
Men's 110 m hurdles		H		F						
Men's 400 m hurdles	H	F								
Men's 3000 m steeplechase				F						
Men's 4 × 100 m relay						H			F	
Men's 4 × 400 m relay								H	F	
Men's marathon										F
Men's 20 km walk	F									
Men's high jump						F				
Men's pole vault		F								
Men's long jump								F		
Men's triple jump				F						
Men's shot put		F								
Men's discus throw									F	
Men's hammer throw		F								
Men's javelin throw								F		
Men's decathlon				●		●				
Women's 100 m		H	F							
Women's 200 m				H		F				
Women's 400 m		H				F				
Women's 800 m	H	F								
Women's 1500 m						F				
Women's 5000 m								F		
Women's 10,000 m		F								
Women's 100 m hurdles				H		F				
Women's 400 m hurdles		F								
Women's 4 × 100 m relay									F	
Women's 4 × 400 m relay									F	
Women's marathon									F	
Women's 20 km walk	F									
Women's high jump									F	
Women's pole vault				F						
Women's long jump	F									
Women's triple jump									F	
Women's shot put				F						
Women's discus throw						F				
Women's hammer throw								F		
Women's javelin throw	F									
Women's heptathlon	●	●								

== Medalists ==
=== Men ===
Event	Gold		Silver		Bronze	
100 m	Jamal Al-Saffar; Saudi Arabia	10.24	Nobuharu Asahara; Japan	10.29	Chen Haijian; China	10.34
200 m	Shingo Suetsugu; Japan	20.38	Gennadiy Chernovol; Kazakhstan	20.57	Yang Yaozu; China	20.58
400 m	Fawzi Al-Shammari; Kuwait	44.93 =GR	Hamdan Al-Bishi; Saudi Arabia	44.95	Rohan Pradeep Kumara; Sri Lanka	45.67
800 m	Rashid Mohamed; Bahrain	1:47.12	K. M. Binu; India	1:47.57	Li Huiquan; China	1:47.77
1500 m	Rashid Ramzi; Bahrain	3:47.33	Dou Zhaobo; China	3:48.51	Li Huiquan; China	3:48.55
5000 m	Mukhlid Al-Otaibi; Saudi Arabia	13:41.48	Abdelhak Zakaria; Bahrain	13:43.82	Khamis Abdullah Saifeldin; Qatar	13:44.42
10,000 m	Mukhlid Al-Otaibi; Saudi Arabia	28:41.89	Ahmed Ibrahim Warsama; Qatar	28:43.53	Abdelhak Zakaria; Bahrain	28:46.11
110 m hurdles	Liu Xiang; China	13.27; GR	Satoru Tanigawa; Japan	13.83	Park Tae-kyong; South Korea	13.89
400 m hurdles	Hadi Soua'an Al-Somaily; Saudi Arabia	48.42; GR	Mubarak Al-Nubi; Qatar	48.98	Dai Tamesue; Japan	49.29
3000 m steeplechase	Khamis Abdullah Saifeldin; Qatar	8:30.52; GR	Yoshitaka Iwamizu; Japan	8:31.75	Shared silver	
3000 m steeplechase	Khamis Abdullah Saifeldin; Qatar	8:30.52; GR	Abubaker Ali Kamal; Qatar	8:31.75	Shared silver	
4 × 100 m relay	Thailand; Reanchai Seeharwong; Vissanu Sophanich; Ekkachai Janthana; Sittichai Suwonprateep	38.82; GR	Japan; Hisashi Miyazaki; Shingo Suetsugu; Hiroyasu Tsuchie; Nobuharu Asahara	38.90	China; Shen Yunbao; Chen Haijian; Yin Hanzhao; Han Chaoming	39.09
4 × 400 m relay	Saudi Arabia; Hamed Al-Bishi; Hadi Soua'an Al-Somaily; Mohammed Al-Salhi; Hamdan Al-Bishi	3:02.47	India; Purukottam Ramachandran; K. J. Manoj Lal; Satvir Singh; Bhupinder Singh	3:04.22	Sri Lanka; Rohan Pradeep Kumara; Ranga Wimalawansa; Prasanna Amarasekara; Sugath Thilakaratne	3:04.37
Marathon	Lee Bong-ju; South Korea	2:14:04	Koji Shimizu; Japan	2:17:47	Ryuji Takei; Japan	2:18:38
20 km walk	Valeriy Borisov; Kazakhstan	1:24:20	Yu Chaohong; China	1:24:23	Satoshi Yanagisawa; Japan	1:25:33
High jump	Lee Jin-taek; South Korea	2.23	Wang Zhouzhou; China	2.19	Shared silver	
High jump	Lee Jin-taek; South Korea	2.23	Cui Kai; China	2.19	Shared silver	
High jump	Lee Jin-taek; South Korea	2.23	Kim Tae-hoi; South Korea	2.19	Shared silver	
Pole vault	Grigoriy Yegorov; Kazakhstan	5.40	Satoru Yasuda; Japan	5.40	Fumiaki Kobayashi; Japan	5.20
Long jump	Hussein Al-Sabee; Saudi Arabia	8.14; GR	Li Dalong; China	7.99	Al-Waleed Abdulla; Qatar	7.80
Triple jump	Salem Al-Ahmadi; Saudi Arabia	16.60	Lao Jianfeng; China	16.57	Takashi Komatsu; Japan	16.34
Shot put	Bahadur Singh Sagoo; India	19.03	Bilal Saad Mubarak; Qatar	18.98	Shakti Singh; India	18.27
Discus throw	Wu Tao; China	60.76	Abbas Samimi; Iran	60.44	Anil Kumar; India	59.81
Hammer throw	Koji Murofushi; Japan	78.72; GR	Hiroaki Doi; Japan	69.57	Ye Kuigang; China	68.18
Javelin throw	Li Rongxiang; China	82.21	Yukifumi Murakami; Japan	78.77	Sergey Voynov; Uzbekistan	78.74
Decathlon	Qi Haifeng; China	8041	Dmitriy Karpov; Kazakhstan	7995	Ahmad Hassan Moussa; Qatar	7683

=== Women ===
Event	Gold		Silver		Bronze	
100 m	Susanthika Jayasinghe; Sri Lanka	11.15; GR	Lyubov Perepelova; Uzbekistan	11.38	Qin Wangping; China	11.51
200 m	Saraswati Saha; India	23.28	Ni Xiaoli; China	23.34	Viktoriya Kovyreva; Kazakhstan	23.48
400 m	Damayanthi Dharsha; Sri Lanka	51.13; GR	K. M. Beenamol; India	52.04	Svetlana Bodritskaya; Kazakhstan	52.10
800 m	K. M. Beenamol; India	2:04.17	Madhuri Saxena; India	2:04.94	Zamira Amirova; Uzbekistan	2:05.05
1500 m	Sunita Rani; India	4:06.03; GR	Tatyana Borisova; Kyrgyzstan	4:12.53	Yoshiko Ichikawa; Japan	4:13.42
5000 m	Sun Yingjie; China	14:40.41; GR	Kayoko Fukushi; Japan	14:55.19	Sunita Rani; India	15:18.77
10,000 m	Sun Yingjie; China	30:28.26; GR	Kayoko Fukushi; Japan	30:51.81	Xing Huina; China	31:42.58
100 m hurdles	Feng Yun; China	12.96	Su Yiping; China	13.01	Trecia Roberts; Thailand	13.07
400 m hurdles	Natalya Torshina; Kazakhstan	56.13	Song Yinglan; China	56.43	Yao Yuehua; China	56.56
4 × 100 m relay	China; Zeng Xiujun; Yan Jiankui; Huang Mei; Qin Wangping	43.84	Thailand; Jutamass Tawoncharoen; Supavadee Khawpeag; Orranut Klomdee; Trecia Roberts	44.25	Uzbekistan; Anna Kazakova; Guzel Khubbieva; Lyudmila Dmitriadi; Lyubov Perepelova	44.32
4 × 400 m relay	India; Jincy Phillip; Manjeet Kaur; Soma Biswas; K. M. Beenamol	3:30.84	Kazakhstan; Tatyana Roslanova; Natalya Torshina; Olga Tereshkova; Svetlana Bodritskaya	3:31.72	China; Qin Wangping; Bo Fanfang; Hou Xiufen; Chen Yuxiang	3:32.43
Marathon	Ham Bong-sil; North Korea	2:33:35	Harumi Hiroyama; Japan	2:34:44	Hiromi Ominami; Japan	2:37:48
20 km walk	Wang Qingqing; China	1:33:40; GR	Gao Kelian; China	1:33:59	Svetlana Tolstaya; Kazakhstan	1:35:03
High jump	Tatyana Efimenko; Kyrgyzstan	1.90	Bobby Aloysius; India	1.88	Shared silver	
High jump	Tatyana Efimenko; Kyrgyzstan	1.90	Marina Korzhova; Kazakhstan	1.88	Shared silver	
Pole vault	Gao Shuying; China	4.35; GR	Masumi Ono; Japan	4.10	Qin Xia; China	4.00
Long jump	Anju Bobby George; India	6.53	Maho Hanaoka; Japan	6.47	Yelena Koshcheyeva; Kazakhstan	6.30
Triple jump	Huang Qiuyan; China	14.28; GR	Zhang Hao; China	13.89	Tatyana Bocharova; Kazakhstan	13.26
Shot put	Li Meiju; China	18.62	Lee Myung-sun; South Korea	18.50	Juttaporn Krasaeyan; Thailand	17.53
Discus throw	Neelam Jaswant Singh; India	64.55; GR	Song Aimin; China	61.80	Ma Shuli; China	59.89
Hammer throw	Gu Yuan; China	70.49; GR	Liu Yinghui; China	66.73	Masumi Aya; Japan	62.18
Javelin throw	Lee Young-sun; South Korea	58.87; GR	Liang Lili; China	58.77	Ha Xiaoyan; China	58.29
Heptathlon	Shen Shengfei; China	5911	Soma Biswas; India	5899	J. J. Shobha; India	5870

== Medal table ==
Rank	Nation	Gold	Silver	Bronze	Total
1	China (CHN)	14	14	13	41
2	India (IND)	7	6	4	17
3	Saudi Arabia (KSA)	7	1	0	8
4	Kazakhstan (KAZ)	3	4	5	12
5	South Korea (KOR)	3	2	1	6
6	Japan (JPN)	2	13	8	23
7	Bahrain (BRN)	2	1	1	4
8	Sri Lanka (SRI)	2	0	2	4
9	Qatar (QAT)	1	4	3	8
10	Thailand (THA)	1	1	2	4
11	Kyrgyzstan (KGZ)	1	1	0	2
12	Kuwait (KUW)	1	0	0	1
12	North Korea (PRK)	1	0	0	1
14	Uzbekistan (UZB)	0	1	3	4
15	Iran (IRI)	0	1	0	1
Totals (15 entries)		45	49	42	136

== Participating nations ==
A total of 459 athletes from 39 nations competed in athletics at the 2002 Asian Games:

- Bahrain (6)
- Bangladesh (2)
- Cambodia (1)
- China (64)
- Chinese Taipei (14)
- Hong Kong (6)
- India (37)
- Indonesia (3)
- Iran (4)
- Japan (63)
- Jordan (1)
- Kazakhstan (19)
- Kuwait (7)
- Kyrgyzstan (2)
- Lebanon (3)
- Macau (2)
- Malaysia (8)
- Mongolia (1)
- Myanmar (2)
- Nepal (5)
- North Korea (3)
- Oman (5)
- Pakistan (3)
- Palestine (2)
- Philippines (13)
- Qatar (31)
- Saudi Arabia (26)
- Singapore (1)
- South Korea (62)
- Sri Lanka (13)
- Syria (1)
- Tajikistan (4)
- Thailand (23)
- Timor-Leste (2)
- Turkmenistan (1)
- United Arab Emirates (2)
- Uzbekistan (12)
- Vietnam (4)
- Yemen (1)
