= Tsai Meng-lin =

Taiwanese sprinter

Personal information
- Born: 21 March 1978 (age 48)

Sport
- Sport: Track and field
Medal record
Representing Chinese Taipei
Asian Games
Silver medal – second place	2010 Guangzhou	4x100 m relay
East Asian Games
Gold medal – first place	2009 Hong Kong	4x100 m relay
Bronze medal – third place	2001 Osaka	200m
Bronze medal – third place	2009 Hong Kong	4x400 m relay
Asian Championships
Bronze medal – third place	2009 Guangzhou	4×100 m relay

Tsai Meng-lin (born 21 March 1978) is a retired Taiwanese athlete who specialised in the sprinting events. He represented his country at the 2001 and 2011 World Championships.

His personal bests are 10.29 seconds in the 100 metres (+1.4 m/s, Banchiao 2006) and 20.88 seconds in the 200 metres (+1.8 m/s, Kaohsiung 2002).

== Competition record ==
Year	Competition	Venue	Position	Event	Notes
Representing Chinese Taipei
2001	East Asian Games	Osaka, Japan	3rd	200 m	20.92
2001	World Championships	Edmonton, Canada	46th (h)	100 m	10.57
2001	Universiade	Beijing, China	8th (qf)	100 m	10.63
2001	Universiade	Beijing, China	5th (qf)	200 m	21.32
2002	Asian Championships	Colombo, Sri Lanka	11th (sf)	100 m	10.87
2002	Asian Championships	Colombo, Sri Lanka	11th (sf)	200 m	21.61
2002	Asian Games	Busan, South Korea	8th	100 m	10.53
2002	Asian Games	Busan, South Korea	6th	4 × 100 m relay	40.02
2003	Asian Championships	Manila, Philippines	21st (qf)	100 m	10.80
2003	Asian Championships	Manila, Philippines	11th (sf)	200 m	21.52
2006	Asian Games	Doha, Qatar	4th	4 × 100 m relay	39.99
2009	Asian Championships	Guangzhou, China	3rd	4 × 100 m relay	39.57
2009	East Asian Games	Hong Kong, China	1st	4 × 100 m relay	39.31
2009	East Asian Games	Hong Kong, China	3rd	4 × 400 m relay	3:10.47
2010	Asian Games	Guangzhou, China	2nd	4 × 100 m relay	39.05
2011	Asian Championships	Kobe, Japan	3rd	4 × 100 m relay	39.30
2011	World Championships	Daegu, South Korea	16th (h)	4 × 100 m relay	39.30
