= 2000 Asian Athletics Championships – Men's 200 metres =

The men's 200 metres event at the 2000 Asian Athletics Championships was held in Jakarta, Indonesia on 29–31 August.

== Medalists ==
Gold	Silver	Bronze
Masahiko Fukunaga; Japan	Sittichai Suwonprateep; Thailand	Mohamed Al-Houti; Oman

== Results ==
=== Heats ===
Wind:
Heat 1: -0.3 m/s, Heat 2: -0.9 m/s, Heat 3: -2.0 m/s, Heat 4: -1.6 m/s

Rank	Heat	Name	Nationality	Time	Notes
1	2	Sittichai Suwonprateep	Thailand	21.15	Q
2	1	Masahiko Fukunaga	Japan	21.18	Q
3	4	Mohamed Al-Houti	Oman	21.21	Q
4	3	Hirofumi Nakagawa	Japan	21.32	Q
5	4	Salem Al-Yami	Saudi Arabia	21.38	Q
6	4	Ajay Raj Singh	India	21.39	Q
7	3	Gennadiy Chernovol	Kazakhstan	21.47	Q
8	3	Abdullah Khamis	Qatar	21.55	Q
9	4	Ekkachai Janthana	Thailand	21.60	q
10	1	Xu Zizhou	China	21.61	Q
11	2	Yousef Dehmiri	Iran	21.69	Q
12	1	Ali Khamis Rasheed	United Arab Emirates	21.86	Q
13	2	John Muray	Indonesia	21.96	Q
14	3	Abdolghafar Saghar	Iran	22.02	q
15	1	Subakir	Indonesia	22.08	q
16	4	Rika Fardani	Indonesia	22.45	q
17	2	Shahidul Islam	Bangladesh	22.58	
18	1	Faraj Al-Dosari	Saudi Arabia	22.61	
19	3	Yin Hanzhao	China	22.64	
20	2	Ho Kwan Lung	Hong Kong	22.79	
21	4	Khalifa Al-Majed	Bahrain	23.00	
22	1	Ali Yasir	Pakistan	23.68	
23	3	Sultan Saeed	Maldives	23.86	

=== Semifinals ===
Wind:
Heat 1: +1.9 m/s, Heat 2: +0.4 m/s

Rank	Heat	Name	Nationality	Time	Notes
1	1	Sittichai Suwonprateep	Thailand	20.81	Q
2	1	Hirofumi Nakagawa	Japan	20.82	Q
3	1	Ekkachai Janthana	Thailand	20.91	Q
4	2	Mohamed Al-Houti	Oman	20.93	Q
5	1	Salem Al-Yami	Saudi Arabia	20.94	Q
6	1	Ajay Raj Singh	India	21.06	
7	2	Gennadiy Chernovol	Kazakhstan	21.28	Q
8	2	Abdullah Khamis	Qatar	21.29	Q
9	1	John Muray	Indonesia	21.40	
10	1	Yousef Dehmiri	Iran	21.41	
11	2	Masahiko Fukunaga	Japan	21.47	Q
12	2	Abdolghafar Saghar	Iran	21.88	
13	2	Ali Khamis Rasheed	United Arab Emirates	21.91	
14	2	Subakir	Indonesia	22.03	
15	2	Xu Zizhou	China	22.04	
16	1	Rika Fardani	Indonesia	22.05	

=== Final ===
Wind: +0.4 m/s

Rank	Name	Nationality	Time	Notes
1st place, gold medalist(s)	Masahiko Fukunaga	Japan	20.78	
2nd place, silver medalist(s)	Sittichai Suwonprateep	Thailand	20.79	
3rd place, bronze medalist(s)	Mohamed Al-Houti	Oman	20.81	
4	Abdullah Khamis	Qatar	21.14	
5	Ekkachai Janthana	Thailand	21.19	
6	Hirofumi Nakagawa	Japan	21.24	
7	Salem Al-Yami	Saudi Arabia	21.36	
	Gennadiy Chernovol	Kazakhstan	DNS	
