= Shingo Kawabata =

Japanese sprinter (born 1978)

Personal information
- Nationality: Japan
- Born: 15 May 1978 (age 48) Kagoshima Prefecture, Japan
- Height: 1.75 m (5 ft 9 in)
- Weight: 70 kg (154 lb)

Sport
- Sport: Track and field
- Event: 100 metres
- University team: Hosei University

Achievements and titles
- Personal bests: 100 m: 10.11 (Tokyo 2000) 200 m: 20.74 (Maebashi 2003) 60 m: 6.77 (Osaka 2003)
Medal record
Men's athletics
Representing Japan
Asian Championships
Bronze medal – third place	2003 Manila	4×100 m relay
East Asian Games
Gold medal – first place	2001 Osaka	4×100 m relay
Gold medal – first place	2005 Macau	4×100 m relay
Silver medal – second place	2001 Osaka	100 m
Universiade
Gold medal – first place	2001 Beijing	4×100 m relay

Shingo Kawabata (川畑 伸吾, Kawabata Shingo; born 15 May 1978) is a Japanese former sprinter who competed in the 2000 Summer Olympics.

== Personal bests ==
Event	Time	Wind	Venue	Date	Notes
Outdoor
100 m	10.11 s	+0.3 m/s	Tokyo, Japan	2 September 2000	
200 m	20.74 s	+0.2 m/s	Maebashi, Japan	12 October 2003	
Indoor
60 m	6.77 s		Osaka, Japan	22 February 2003	

== Records ==
- 100 metres
  - Former Japanese university record holder - 10.11 s (wind: +0.3 m/s) (Tokyo, 2 September 2000)
- Medley relay (100m×200m×300m×400m)
  - Current Japanese record holder - 1:48.27 s (relay leg: 1st) (Yokohama, 15 September 2001)^{[a]}

^{a} with Nobuharu Asahara, Kenji Tabata, and Jun Osakada

== International competition record ==
Year	Competition	Venue	Position	Event	Notes
Representing Japan
1996	World Junior Championships	Sydney, Australia	15th (qf)	100 m	10.88 (wind: -1.5 m/s)
1996	World Junior Championships	Sydney, Australia	5th	4 × 100 m relay	39.75 (relay leg: 4th)
2000	Olympics	Sydney, Australia	39th (qf)	100 m	10.60 (wind: -1.7 m/s)
2000	Olympics	Sydney, Australia	5th (sf)	4 × 100 m relay	38.31 (relay leg: 1st) =AR
2001	World Indoor Championships	Lisbon, Portugal	23rd (sf)	60 m	6.85
2001	East Asian Games	Osaka, Japan	6th	100 m	10.58 (wind: 0.0 m/s)
2001	East Asian Games	Osaka, Japan	1st	4 × 100 m relay	38.93 (relay leg: 1st) GR
2001	Universiade	Beijing, China	10th (sf)	100 m	10.43 (wind: +1.5 m/s)
2001	Universiade	Beijing, China	1st	4 × 100 m relay	38.77 (relay leg: 1st)
2003	Asian Championships	Manila, Philippines	4th	100 m	10.42 (wind: 0.0 m/s)
2003	Asian Championships	Manila, Philippines	3rd	4 × 100 m relay	39.59 (relay leg: 2nd)
2005	East Asian Games	Macau, China	2nd	100 m	10.54 (wind: -1.4 m/s)
2005	East Asian Games	Macau, China	1st	4 × 100 m relay	39.61 (relay leg: 1st)
