= Yuriy Pakhlyayev =

Kazakhstani high jumper (born 1974)

Personal information
- Nationality: Kazakhstani
- Born: 24 April 1974 (age 52)
- Height: 1.88 m (6 ft 2 in)
- Weight: 68 kg (150 lb)

Sport
- Sport: Athletics
- Event: High jump
Medal record
Men's athletics
Representing Kazakhstan
Asian Championships
Gold medal – first place	2000 Jakarta	High jump
Asian Indoor Championships
Gold medal – first place	2004 Tehran	High jump

Yuriy Pakhlyayev (Cyrillic: Юрий Пахляев; born 20 December 1974) is a retired Kazakhstani athlete who specialised in the high jump. He represented his country at the 2000 Summer Olympics without qualifying for the final.

His personal bests in the event are 2.26 metres outdoors (Almaty 2000) and 2.27 metres indoors (Tashkent 1997).

== Competition record ==
Year	Competition	Venue	Position	Notes
Representing Kazakhstan
2000	Asian Championships	Jakarta, Indonesia	1st	2.23 m
2000	Olympic Games	Sydney, Australia	19th (q)	2.24 m
2001	East Asian Games	Osaka, Japan	3rd	2.15 m
2002	Asian Games	Busan, South Korea	8th	2.10 m
2004	Asian Indoor Championships	Tehran, Iran	1st	2.23 m
