= Nobuharu Asahara =

Japanese athlete (born 1972)

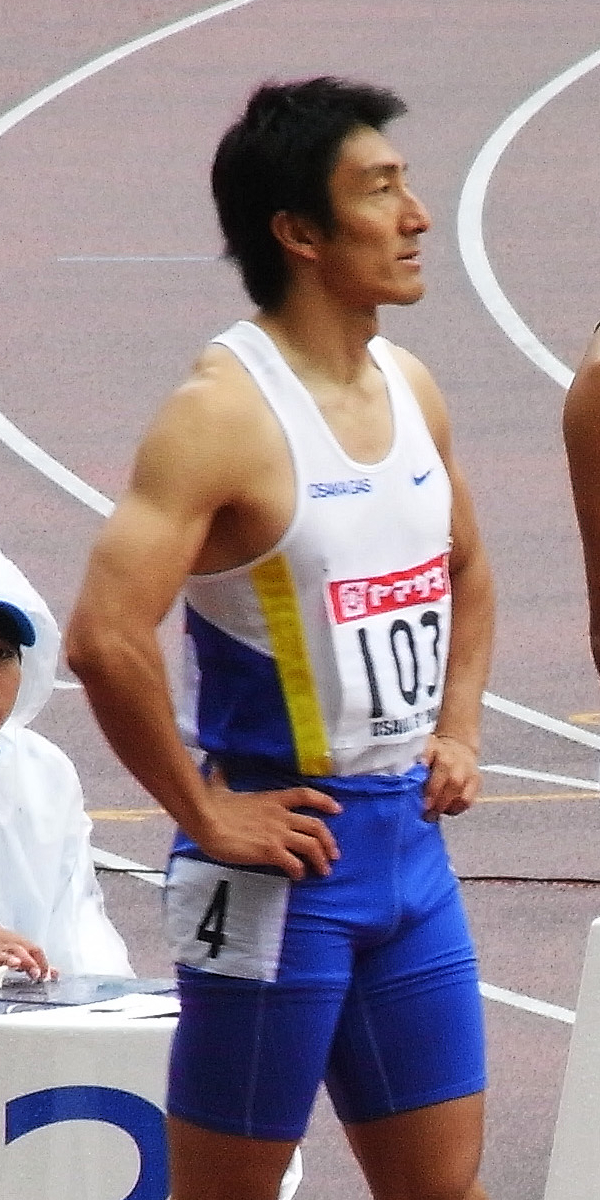

Personal information
- Nationality: Japan
- Born: 21 June 1972 (age 54) Kobe, Hyogo Prefecture, Japan
- Height: 1.79 m (5 ft 10 in)
- Weight: 75 kg (165 lb)

Sport
- Country: Japan
- Sport: Men's athletics
- Events: Sprints, Long jump
- University team: Doshisha University
- Retired: 23 September 2008
- Now coaching: Osaka Gas Track and Field Club

Achievements and titles
- Personal bests: 100 m: 10.02 (Oslo 2001) 200 m: 20.39 (Stuttgart 1997) Long Jump: 8.13 (Manila 1993)
Medal record
Olympic Games
Silver medal – second place	2008 Beijing	4 × 100 m relay
Asian Games
Silver medal – second place	2002 Busan	100 m
Silver medal – second place	2002 Busan	4 × 100 m relay
Asian Championships
Gold medal – first place	1993 Manila	Long jump
East Asian Games
Gold medal – first place	1997 Busan	100 m
Gold medal – first place	1997 Busan	4 × 100 m relay
Silver medal – second place	1993 Shanghai	Long jump
Bronze medal – third place	2001 Osaka	100 m
Asian Junior Championships
Gold medal – first place	1990 Beijing	4 × 100 m relay
Silver medal – second place	1990 Beijing	Long jump

Nobuharu Asahara (朝原 宣治, Asahara Nobuharu; born 21 June 1972 in Kita-ku, Kobe) is a former Japanese athlete who specialized in the 100 meters and long jump. He won the 100 m at the Japanese national championship on five occasions in 1996, 1997, 2000, 2001 and 2002, and he took part in the Olympics four times in 1996, 2000, 2004 and 2008. He represented Japan six times at the World Championships in Athletics.

At global-level championships, he reached the semifinals five times: at the 1996 Olympics and the World Championships in 1997, 2001, 2003 and 2007. He also finished twelfth in the long jump final at the 1995 World Championships. In addition, he won silver medals in both 100 m and 4 × 100 m relay at the 2002 Asian Games.

== Career ==
=== Early career ===
Asahara started out as a long jump specialist and he won a silver medal at the 1990 Asian Junior Championships with a jump of 7.49 meters. He gained his first major regional medal at the 1993 East Asian Games in May, where he took a silver with a jump of 7.93 m to finish behind Nai Hui-Fang. He won the 1993 Asian Championships in a new championship record and career best of 8.13 m (a mark which was broken in 1995 by Huang Geng).

He began to establish himself as Japan's top long jumper, winning the event at the Japanese national championships for the first time in 1994, and going on to two more national titles in 1995 and 1997 (missing out to Shigeru Tagawa in 1996). He completed a 100 m and long jump double at the 1997 National Sports Festival of Japan.

He set three Japanese records in the 100 meters, with 10.19 seconds in 1993, 10.14 seconds in 1996 and 10.08 seconds in 1997. He recorded 10.17 seconds at 35 years old in 2008.

=== Olympic medal and retirement ===
Asahara represented Japan at the 2008 Summer Olympics in Beijing, competing at the 100 meters sprint. He placed fourth in his first round heat behind Michael Frater, Pierre Brown and Darrel Brown, normally causing elimination. However his time of 10.25 was the fastest losing time and he advanced to the second round. There he could not repeat himself, ending up in eighth place with a time of 10.37 seconds. Together with Shingo Suetsugu, Shinji Takahira and Naoki Tsukahara he also competed at the 4 × 100 metres relay. In their qualification heat they placed second in behind Trinidad and Tobago, but in front of the Netherlands and Brazil. Their time of 38.52 was the third fastest out of sixteen participating nations in the first round and they qualified for the final. There they sprinted to a time of 38.15 seconds, the third time after the Jamaican and Trinidad teams, winning the bronze medal. It was the first Olympic medal for Japan in 80 years in track races. The medal was upgraded to a silver after the Jamaicans were DQ'ed due to Nesta Carter's positive doping sample.

On 23 September 2008, he retired from competitive athletics at the Kawasaki Super Meet, finishing third in the 100 m behind Mark Lewis-Francis and Michael Rodgers. After being greeted on the podium by Usain Bolt, Asahara said "It wasn't my best race, but it was exciting to run in front of so many fans. It was quite appropriate for my final race." After his retirement he was employed by Osaka Gas and opened an athletics training camp for children.

== Personal life ==
Nobuharu Asahara married synchronised swimmer Fumiko Okuno in 2002. They have 3 children together.

== Personal bests ==
Event	Time (sec)	Wind (m/s)	Venue	Date	Notes
50 metres (indoor)	5.75		Liévin, France	24 February 2002	Japan's record
60 metres (indoor)	6.55		Sindelfingen, Germany	1 March 1997	Japan's record
100 metres	10.02	+2.0	Oslo, Norway	13 July 2001	Japan's 4th-fastest time
100 metres (indoor)	10.41		Tampere, Finland	4 February 2002	Asian record (Asian best)
200 metres	20.39	+0.9	Stuttgart, Germany	13 July 1997	
Long jump	8.13 m	+0.7	Manila, Philippines	3 December 1993	
Long jump (indoor)	7.83 m		Paris, France	7 March 1997	

- All information taken from IAAF profile.

== Records ==
- 100 metres
  - Former Japanese record holder - 10.08 s (wind: +0.8 m/s) (Lausanne, 2 July 1997)
  - Former Japanese university record holder - 10.19 s (wind: +2.0 m/s) (Naruto, 26 October 1993)
- 4 × 100 m relay
  - Former Asian record holder - 38.03 s (relay leg: 4th) (Osaka, 1 September 2007)^{[a]}
- Medley relay (100 m + 200 m + 300 m + 400 m)
  - Current Japanese record holder - 1:48.27 s (relay leg: 2nd) (Yokohama, 15 September 2001)^{[b]}
- 50 metres (Indoor)
  - Current Japanese record holder - 5.75 s (Liévin, 24 February 2002)
- 60 metres (Indoor)
  - Current Japanese record holder - 6.55 s (Sindelfingen, 1 March 1997)
- 100 metres (Indoor)
  - Current Asian record (Asian best) holder - 10.41 s (Tampere, 4 February 2002)

^{a} with Naoki Tsukahara, Shingo Suetsugu, and Shinji Takahira
^{b} with Shingo Kawabata, Kenji Tabata, and Jun Osakada

== International competition record ==
Year	Competition	Venue	Position	Event	Notes
Representing Japan
1990	Asian Junior Championships	Beijing, China	2nd	Long jump	7.49 m (wind: +0.9 m/s)
1990	Asian Junior Championships	Beijing, China	1st	4 × 100 m relay	40.95 (relay leg: 2nd)
1993	East Asian Games	Shanghai, China	2nd	Long jump	7.93 m
1993	Asian Championships	Manila, Philippines	1st	Long jump	8.13 m (wind: +0.7 m/s) PB
1994	Asian Games	Hiroshima, Japan	9th	Long jump	7.65 m
1995	Universiade	Fukuoka, Japan	7th	Long jump	8.03 m (wind: +1.2 m/s)
1995	World Championships	Gothenburg, Sweden	12th	Long jump	8.03 m (wind: +1.2 m/s)
1996	Olympics	Atlanta, United States	10th (sf)	100 m	10.16 (wind: -0.5 m/s)
1996	Olympics	Atlanta, United States	– (h)	4 × 100 m relay	DQ (relay leg: 4th)
1996	Olympics	Atlanta, United States	36th (q)	Long jump	7.46 m (wind: +0.6 m/s)
1997	World Indoor Championships	Paris, France	14th (q)	Long jump	7.83 m PB
1997	East Asian Games	Busan, South Korea	1st	100 m	10.04 (wind: +4.0 m/s)
1997	East Asian Games	Busan, South Korea	1st	4 × 100 m relay	39.32 (relay leg: 4th) GR
1997	East Asian Games	Busan, South Korea	4th	Long jump	7.89 m (wind: +1.6 m/s)
1997	World Championships	Athens, Greece	14th (sf)	100 m	10.33 (wind: +0.5 m/s)
1997	World Championships	Athens, Greece	7th (sf)	4 × 100 m relay	38.31 (relay leg: 4th) AR
1997	World Championships	Athens, Greece	17th (q)	Long jump	7.88 m (wind: -0.4 m/s)
1999	World Indoor Championships	Maebashi, Japan	15th (sf)	60 m	6.60
2000	Olympics	Sydney, Australia	6th	4 × 100 m relay	38.66 (relay leg: 4th)
2001	World Indoor Championships	Lisbon, Portugal	17th (sf)	60 m	6.72
2001	East Asian Games	Osaka, Japan	3rd	100 m	10.44 (wind: 0.0 m/s)
2001	World Championships	Edmonton, Alberta, Canada	13th (sf)	100 m	10.33 (wind: -1.2 m/s)
2001	World Championships	Edmonton, Alberta, Canada	4th	4 × 100 m relay	38.96 (relay leg: 4th)
2002	Asian Games	Busan, South Korea	2nd	100 m	10.29 (wind: +0.3 m/s)
2002	Asian Games	Busan, South Korea	2nd	4 × 100 m relay	38.90 (relay leg: 4th)
2003	World Indoor Championships	Birmingham, United Kingdom	19th (h)	60 m	6.71
2003	World Championships	Saint-Denis, France	14th (sf)	100 m	10.42 (wind: +0.5 m/s)
2003	World Championships	Saint-Denis, France	6th	4 × 100 m relay	39.05 (relay leg: 4th)
2004	Olympics	Athens, Greece	21st (qf)	100 m	10.24 (wind: +0.2 m/s)
2004	Olympics	Athens, Greece	4th	4 × 100 m relay	38.49 (relay leg: 4th)
2005	World Championships	Helsinki, Finland	28th (qf)	100 m	10.58 (wind: -2.0 m/s)
2005	World Championships	Helsinki, Finland	8th	4 × 100 m relay	38.77 (relay leg: 4th)
2005	Asian Championships	Incheon, South Korea	4th	100 m	10.57 (wind: -0.3 m/s)
2007	World Championships	Osaka, Japan	16th (sf)	100 m	10.36 (wind: +0.3 m/s)
2007	World Championships	Osaka, Japan	5th	4 × 100 m relay	38.03 (relay leg: 4th) AR
2008	Olympics	Beijing, China	36th (qf)	100 m	10.37 (wind: -0.2 m/s)
2008	Olympics	Beijing, China	2nd	4 × 100 m relay	38.15 (relay leg: 4th)

== National Championship ==
He has won the individual national championship eight times.

- 5 wins in the 100 metres (1996, 1997, 2000, 2001, 2002)
- 3 wins in the long jump (1994, 1995, 1997)

=== Track records ===
As of 6 September 2024, Asahara holds the following track records for 100 metres.

Location	Time	Windspeed m/s	Date
Kanazawa	10.05	+1.4	09/06/2002
Busan	10.04	+4.0	15/05/1997
