= 2002 Asian Athletics Championships – Men's 4 × 100 metres relay =

The men's 4 × 100 metres relay event at the 2002 Asian Athletics Championships was held in Colombo, Sri Lanka on 9–10 August.

== Results ==
=== Heats ===
Rank	Heat	Nation	Time	Notes
1	2	Thailand	39.09	Q
2	2	Saudi Arabia	39.17	Q
3	2	Qatar	39.26	Q
4	1	China	39.58	Q
5	1	Japan	40.01	Q
6	1	Malaysia	40.06	Q
7	1	India	40.69	q
8	2	Hong Kong	40.89	q
9	1	Oman	40.71	
10	2	Singapore	41.70	
	2	Sri Lanka	DNS	

=== Final ===
Rank	Nation	Athletes	Time	Notes
1st place, gold medalist(s)	Thailand	Sittichai Suwonprateep, Ekkachai Janthana, Vissanu Sophanich, Reanchai Srihawong	38.99	
2nd place, silver medalist(s)	Saudi Arabia	Khalifa Al-Sagar, Salem Al-Yami, Mubarak Mubarak, Jamal Al-Saffar	39.16	
3rd place, bronze medalist(s)	Qatar	Mohd Sultan Al-Sheeb, Khalid Yousuf Al-Obaidi, Abdullah Khamis Al-Hamad, Khalid Habash Al-Suwaidi	39.39	
4	Japan		39.41	
5	India		39.72	
6	Hong Kong		40.26	
7	Malaysia		40.55	
8	South Korea		3.42.23	
