= Reanchai Seeharwong =

Thai sprinter (born 1976)

Personal information
- Born: 24 March 1976 (age 50) Samut Prakan, Thailand

Sport
- Country: Thailand
- Sport: Track and field
- Event(s): 100 meters, 200 meters
Medal record
Men's athletics
Representing Thailand
Asian Games
Gold medal – first place	2002 Busan	4×100 m
Silver medal – second place	1998 Bangkok	100 m
Silver medal – second place	1998 Bangkok	4×100 m
Asian Championships
Gold medal – first place	2002 Colombo	4×100 m
Silver medal – second place	1995 Jakarta	4×100 m

Reanchai Seeharwong (born 24 March 1976 in Samut Prakan) is a retired Thai sprinter who specialized in the 100 and 200 metres.

He won the bronze medal in the 200 metres at the 1994 Asian Junior Championships. He won the 100 and 200 metres back to back at both the 1995, 1999 and 2001 South East Asian Games. His breakthrough came at the 1998 Asian Games where he won the silver medal in the 100 metres as well as another silver in the 4 × 100 metres relay.

At the 2002 Asian Championships he reached the semi-final of the 100 metres and won a gold medal in the 4 × 100 metres relay. At the 2002 Asian Games he also reached the semi-final of the 100 metres and won a gold medal in the 4 × 100 metres relay.

Subsequently, he finished fifth with the Asian team in the 4 x 100 metres relay at the 2002 IAAF World Cup. He competed individually at the 1999 World Championships and the 2003 World Indoor Championships as well as in relay at the 1999 World Championships without reaching the final.

His personal best times was 10.23 seconds in the 100 metres, achieved at the 1998 Asian Games in Bangkok; and 20.69 seconds in the 200 metres, achieved at the 1999 South East Asian Games in Bandar Seri Begawan. His 100 metres time is the Thai record, and he holds an Asian record in the rarely contested 4 × 200 metres relay. His 200 metres time is the Southeast Asian Games record.
