= 2000 Asian Athletics Championships – Men's high jump =

The men's high jump event at the 2000 Asian Athletics Championships was held in Jakarta, Indonesia on 31 August.

== Results ==
Rank	Name	Nationality	1.90	2.00	2.05	2.10	2.15	2.19	2.23	2.27	Result	Notes
1st place, gold medalist(s)	Yuriy Pakhlyayev	Kazakhstan	–	–	o	o	o	o	o	xxx	2.23	
2nd place, silver medalist(s)	Wang Zhouzhou	China	–	o	–	o	o	xo	xxo	xxx	2.23	
3rd place, bronze medalist(s)	Yoshiteru Kaihoko	Japan	–	–	o	o	o	o	xxx		2.19	
4	Omar Moussa Al-Masrahi	Saudi Arabia									2.10	
5	Diding Rutopo	Indonesia									1.90	
	Kim Tae-Hoi	South Korea	–	–	–	xxx					NM	
	Aria Juniawan	Indonesia	–	xxx							NM	
