= Wang Zhouzhou =

Chinese high jumper

Medal record

Men's athletics

Representing China

Asian Championships
Gold medal – first place	2003 Manila	High jump
Silver medal – second place	2000 Jakarta	High jump

Wang Zhouzhou (王舟舟, born 20 April 1977) is a Chinese high jumper. His personal best jump is 2.27 metres, achieved in June 1999 in Shanghai.

== Achievements ==
Year	Competition	Venue	Position	Notes
Representing China
2000	Asian Championships	Jakarta, Indonesia	2nd	2.23 m
2001	Universiade	Beijing, China	5th	2.26 m
2001	East Asian Games	Osaka, Japan	3rd	2.15 m
2002	Asian Games	Busan, South Korea	2nd	2.19 m
2003	Universiade	Daegu, South Korea	6th	2.20 m
2003	Asian Championships	Manila, Philippines	1st	2.23 m
2003	Afro-Asian Games	Hyderabad, India	7th	2.00 m
