= Kim Tae-hoi =

South Korean high jumper

Personal information
- Born: 3 September 1973 (age 53) Jincheon County, South Korea

Sport
- Sport: Track and field
Medal record
Representing South Korea
Asian Games
Silver medal – second place	2002 Busan	High jump
East Asian Games
Silver medal – second place	1997 Busan	High jump

Kim Tae-Hoi (born 3 September 1973) is a retired South Korean high jumper.

He won the silver medal at the 2002 Asian Games. He also competed at the 1996 Olympic Games, but did not reach the final.

His personal best jump is 2.27 metres, achieved in April 1996 in Kyongju.

== Achievements ==
Year	Competition	Venue	Position	Notes
Representing South Korea
1992	World Junior Championships	Seoul, South Korea	16th	2.05 m
1996	Olympic Games	Atlanta, United States	32nd (q)	2.15 m
1997	East Asian Games	Busan, South Korea	2nd	2.24 m
1997	Universiade	Catania, Italy	13th (q)	2.15 m
2000	Asian Championships	Jakarta, Indonesia	–	NM
2002	Asian Games	Busan, South Korea	2nd	2.19 m
