= Chintaka de Zoysa =

Sri Lankan sprinter

Gunaratna Chintaka de Zoysa (born 18 December 1971) is a former Sri Lankan sprinter who competed in the men's 100m competition at the 1996 Summer Olympics. He recorded a 10.55, not enough to qualify for the next round past the heats. His personal best is 10.29, set in 1999.
