= Athletics at the 2002 Asian Games – Men's high jump =

Men's high jump at the 2002 Asian Games
- Venue: Busan Asiad Main Stadium
- Date: 10 October 2002
- Competitors: 15 from 13 nations

Medalists
gold medal	Lee Jin-taek	South Korea
silver medal	Wang Zhouzhou	China
silver medal	Cui Kai	China
silver medal	Kim Tae-hoi	South Korea

The men's high jump competition at the 2002 Asian Games in Busan, South Korea was held on 10 October at the Busan Asiad Main Stadium.

== Schedule ==
All times are Korea Standard Time (UTC+09:00)

Date	Time	Event
Thursday, 10 October 2002	15:00	Final

== Records ==
Prior to this competition, the existing world, Asian and Games records were as follows.

World Record	Javier Sotomayor (CUB)	2.45	Salamanca, Spain	27 July 1993
Asian Record	Zhu Jianhua (CHN)	2.39	Eberstadt, West Germany	10 June 1984
Games Record	Zhu Jianhua (CHN)	2.33	New Delhi, India	1 December 1982

== Results ==
Rank	Athlete	Attempt								Result	Notes
Rank	Athlete	1.95	2.00	2.05	2.10	2.15	2.19	2.23	2.27	Result	Notes
1st place, gold medalist(s)	Lee Jin-taek (KOR)	–	–	–	–	O	O	O	XXX	2.23	
2nd place, silver medalist(s)	Wang Zhouzhou (CHN)	–	–	O	O	O	O	XXX		2.19	
2nd place, silver medalist(s)	Cui Kai (CHN)	–	–	O	O	O	O	XXX		2.19	
2nd place, silver medalist(s)	Kim Tae-hoi (KOR)	–	–	–	O	O	O	XXX		2.19	
5	Salem Nasser Bakheet (BRN)	–	–	–	O	O	XXO	XXX		2.19	
6	Omar Al-Masrahi (KSA)	–	–	O	O	XO	XXX			2.15	
6	Chen Hung-chieh (TPE)	–	–	O	O	XO	XX–	X		2.15	
8	Yuriy Pakhlyayev (KAZ)	–	–	O	O	XXX				2.10	
8	Jean-Claude Rabbath (LIB)	–	–	–	O	XXX				2.10	
8	Manjula Kumara (SRI)	–	–	O	O	XXX				2.10	
11	Takahiro Uchida (JPN)	–	–	XO	O	XXX				2.10	
12	Loo Kum Zee (MAS)	–	O	O	XO	XXX				2.10	
13	Nguyễn Duy Bằng (VIE)	–	O	O	XXO	XXX				2.10	
14	Khalil Al-Khalil (KUW)	O	O	O	XXX					2.05	
14	Sean Guevara (PHI)	–	O	O	XXX					2.05	
