= Huang Hsin-ping =

Taiwanese sprinter

Huang Hsin-Ping (黃信平; born 10 September 1976) is a Taiwanese former sprinter who competed in the men's 100m competition at the 1996 Summer Olympics. He recorded a 10.70, not enough to qualify for the next round past the heats. His personal best is 10.41, set in 1995.
