= Sittichai Suwonprateep =

Thai sprinter (born 1980)

Medal record

Men's athletics

Representing Thailand

Asian Championships
Gold medal – first place	2000 Jakarta	4 × 100 m
Gold medal – first place	2002 Colombo	4 × 100 m
Gold medal – first place	2007 Amman	4 × 100 m
Silver medal – second place	2000 Jakarta	200 m
Silver medal – second place	2005 Incheon	4 × 100 m
Bronze medal – third place	2002 Colombo	200 m

Sittichai Suwonprateep (born November 17, 1980, in Samut Prakan) is a track and field sprint athlete who competes internationally for Thailand and is a naval officer with the Royal Thai Navy.

Suwonprateep represented Thailand at the 2008 Summer Olympics in Beijing. He competed at the 4 × 100 metres relay together with Siriroj Darasuriyong, Sompote Suwannarangsri and Apinan Sukaphai. In their qualification heat they placed fifth in a time of 39.40 seconds and they were eliminated.

== Competition record ==
Year	Competition	Venue	Position	Event	Notes
Representing Thailand
1999	World Championships	Seville, Spain	56th (h)	200 m	21.32
1999	World Championships	Seville, Spain	13th (h)	4 × 100 m relay	39.55
1999	Asian Junior Championships	Singapore	1st	200 m	20.96
2000	Asian Championships	Jakarta, Indonesia	2nd	200 m	20.79
2000	Asian Championships	Jakarta, Indonesia	1st	4 × 100 m relay	38.80
2000	Olympic Games	Sydney, Australia	13th (sf)	4 × 100 m relay	39.05
2002	Asian Championships	Colombo, Sri Lanka	3rd	200 m	21.04
2002	Asian Championships	Colombo, Sri Lanka	1st	4 × 100 m relay	38.99
2002	Asian Games	Busan, South Korea	7th (sf)	100 m	10.47
2002	Asian Games	Busan, South Korea	6th	200 m	20.79
2002	Asian Games	Busan, South Korea	1st	4 × 100 m relay	38.82
2003	World Championships	Paris, France	− (h)	200 m	DQ
2003	Asian Championships	Manila, Philippines	6th	100 m	10.48
2003	Asian Championships	Manila, Philippines	24th (h)	200 m	23.77
2003	Afro-Asian Games	Hyderabad, India	5th	200 m	21.21
2003	Afro-Asian Games	Hyderabad, India	4th	4 × 100 m relay	39.85
2003	Southeast Asian Games	Hanoi, Vietnam	2nd	100 m	10.50
2003	Southeast Asian Games	Hanoi, Vietnam	2nd	200 m	21.23
2003	Southeast Asian Games	Hanoi, Vietnam	1st	4 × 100 m relay	40.05
2005	Universiade	İzmir, Turkey	18th (qf)	200 m	21.34
2005	Universiade	İzmir, Turkey	–	4 × 100 m relay	DNF
2005	Asian Championships	Incheon, South Korea	2nd	4 × 100 m relay	39.23
2005	Southeast Asian Games	Manila, Philippines	1st	200 m	20.94
2005	Southeast Asian Games	Manila, Philippines	1st	4 × 100 m relay	39.74
2006	Asian Games	Doha, Qatar	19th (h)	200 m	23.87
2006	Asian Games	Doha, Qatar	1st	4 × 100 m relay	39.21
2007	Universiade	Bangkok, Thailand	22nd (qf)	200 m	22.08
2007	Universiade	Bangkok, Thailand	1st	4 × 100 m relay	39.15
2007	World Championships	Osaka, Japan	42nd (h)	200 m	21.87
2007	Southeast Asian Games	Nakhon Ratchasima, Thailand	2nd	200 m	20.84
2007	Southeast Asian Games	Nakhon Ratchasima, Thailand	1st	4 × 100 m relay	38.95
2008	Olympic Games	Beijing, China	9th (h)	4 × 100 m relay	39.40
2009	World Championships	Berlin, Germany	15th (h)	4 × 100 m relay	39.73
2009	Asian Championships	Guangzhou, China	17th (h)	200 m	21.71
2009	Asian Championships	Guangzhou, China	4th	4 × 100 m relay	39.57
2009	Southeast Asian Games	Vientiane, Laos	2nd	200 m	21.12
2009	Southeast Asian Games	Vientiane, Laos	1st	4 × 100 m relay	39.34
2010	Asian Games	Guangzhou, China	3rd	4 × 100 m relay	39.09
