= Gennadiy Chernovol =

Kazakhstani sprinter (born 1976)

Medal record

Men's athletics

Representing Kazakhstan

Asian Championships
Gold medal – first place	2002 Colombo	200 m
Silver medal – second place	2002 Colombo	100 m
Silver medal – second place	2003 Manila	100 m
Bronze medal – third place	1998 Fukuoka	200 m

Gennadiy Sergeyevich Chernovol (Russian: Геннадий Сергеевич Черновол; born June 6, 1976, in Soviet Union) is a former Kazakhstani athlete who competed in the sprints events. He is married to a high jumper, Anna Chicherova.

== Competition record ==
Year	Competition	Venue	Position	Event	Notes
Representing Kazakhstan
1997	Central Asian Games	Almaty, Kazakhstan	1st	200 m	
1998	Asian Championships	Fukuoka, Japan	3rd	200 m	20.92
1998	Asian Games	Bangkok, Thailand	7th	100 m	10.41
1998	Asian Games	Bangkok, Thailand	4th	200 m	20.84
1999	World Indoor Championships	Maebashi, Japan	22nd (sf)	60 m	6.73
1999	World Championships	Seville, Spain	48th (h)	200 m	21.05
2000	Asian Championships	Jakarta, Indonesia	7th (sf)	100 m	10.56
2000	Asian Championships	Jakarta, Indonesia	7th (sf)	200 m	21.28
2000	Olympic Games	Sydney, Australia	32nd (h)	200 m	20.95
2001	World Indoor Championships	Lisbon, Portugal	14th (sf)	60 m	6.69
2001	World Indoor Championships	Lisbon, Portugal	8th (sf)	200 m	21.28
2001	East Asian Games	Osaka, Japan	1st	100 m	10.28
2001	East Asian Games	Osaka, Japan	2nd	200 m	20.55
2001	World Championships	Edmonton, Canada	26th (qf)	100 m	10.28
2001	World Championships	Edmonton, Canada	21st (qf)	200 m	20.71
2001	Universiade	Beijing, China	2nd	100 m	10.29
2001	Universiade	Beijing, China	2nd	200 m	20.57
2002	Asian Championships	Colombo, Sri Lanka	2nd	100 m	10.50
2002	Asian Championships	Colombo, Sri Lanka	1st	200 m	20.73
2002	Asian Games	Busan, South Korea	2nd	200 m	20.57
2003	World Indoor Championships	Birmingham, United Kingdom	16th (sf)	60 m	6.69
2003	Central Asian Games	Dushanbe, Tajikistan	1st	100 m	
2003	Central Asian Games	Dushanbe, Tajikistan	1st	200 m	
2003	World Championships	Paris, France	28th (qf)	100 m	10.42
2003	World Championships	Paris, France	39th (h)	200 m	21.11
2003	Asian Championships	Manila, Philippines	2nd	100 m	10.27
2003	Afro-Asian Games	Hyderabad, India	4th	100 m	10.46
2003	Afro-Asian Games	Hyderabad, India	2nd	200 m	20.81
2004	World Indoor Championships	Budapest, Hungary	26th (h)	60 m	6.74
2004	Olympic Games	Athens, Greece	37th (qf)	100 m	10.42
