= Oleg Sergeyev (sprinter) =

Russian sprinter

Personal information
- Nationality: Russian
- Born: 9 March 1975 (age 51) Verkhnyaya Pyshma, Sverdlovsk Oblast, Soviet Union

Sport
- Sport: Sprinting
- Event: 200 metres

Oleg Sergeyev (born 9 March 1975) is a Russian sprinter. He competed in the men's 200 metres at the 2004 Summer Olympics.
