= Lương Tích Thiện =

Vietnamese sprinter (born 1976)

Personal information
- Nationality: Vietnamese
- Born: 24 January 1976 (age 50)

Sport
- Sport: Sprinting
- Event: 100 metres

Lương Tích Thiện (born 24 January 1976) is a Vietnamese sprinter. He competed in the men's 100 metres at the 2000 Summer Olympics.
