= Ahmed Al-Moamari =

Omani sprinter

Personal information
- Nationality: Omani
- Born: 21 December 1972 (age 52)

Sport
- Sport: Sprinting
- Event: 100 metres

Ahmed Al-Moamari (born 21 December 1972) is an Omani sprinter. He competed in the men's 100 metres at the 1992 Summer Olympics.
