= Jamal Al-Saffar =

Saudi Arabian sprinter (born 1971)

Medal record

Men's athletics

Representing Saudi Arabia

Asian Championships
| Gold medal – first place | 2000 Jakarta | 100 m |
| Gold medal – first place | 2002 Colombo | 100 m |
| Silver medal – second place | 2002 Colombo | 4×100 m |
| Bronze medal – third place | 2000 Jakarta | 4×100 m |

Jamal Abdullah Al-Saffar (Arabic: جمال عبدالله الصفار, born 24 October 1971) is a Saudi Arabian sprinter who specialized in the 100 metres. His personal best time was 10.19 seconds, achieved in April 2002 in Al-Kuwait in the athletics event at the 2002 West Asian Games.

== Achievements ==
| Year | Competition | Venue | Position | Notes |
Representing Saudi Arabia
| 1999 | Pan Arab Games | Irbid, Jordan | 1st | 100 m |
| 2000 | Asian Championships | Jakarta, Indonesia | 1st | 100 m |
| 2002 | Asian Championships | Colombo, Sri Lanka | 1st | 100 m |
| 2002 | Asian Games | Busan, South Korea | 1st | 100 m |
| 2002 | World Cup | Madrid, Spain | 5th | 100 m |
