= Poh Seng Song =

Singaporean sprinter (born 1983)

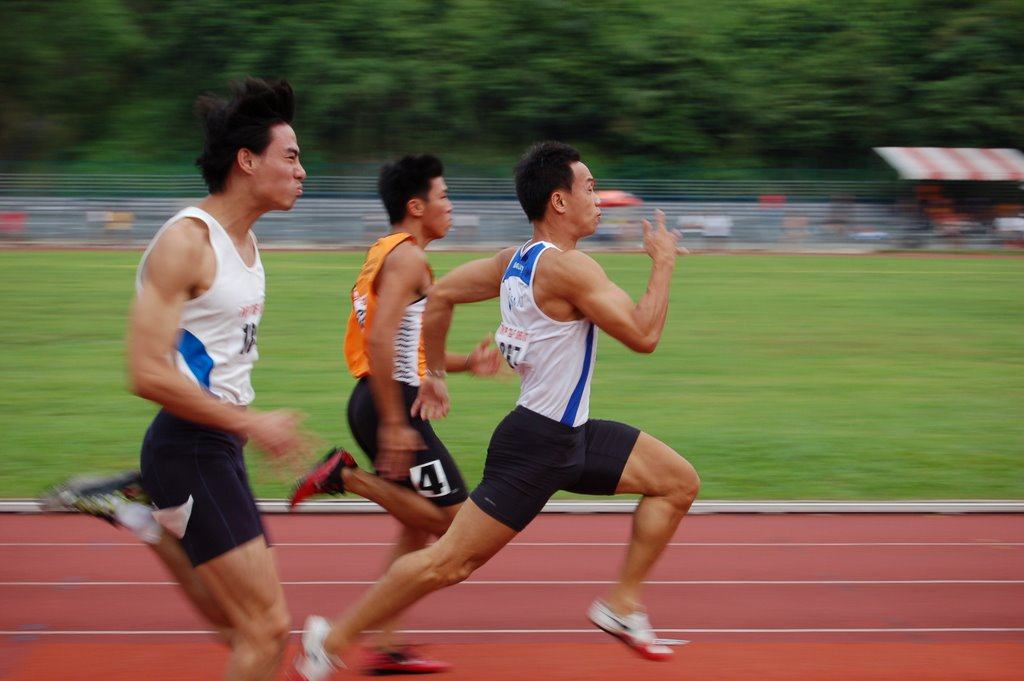
- Poh Seng Song (right) in 2006

Personal information
- National team: Singapore
- Born: 30 January 1983 (age 43) Singapore
- Spouse: Dipna Lim Prasad
- Children: 2
Medal record
Women's athletics
Men's athletics
Representing Singapore
South East Asian Games
Silver medal – second place	2003 Hanoi	4 x 100 metres relay
Bronze medal – third place	2005 Manila	4 x 100 metres relay

Poh Seng Song (born 30 January 1983) is an athlete from Singapore who specialises in the 100 metres sprint and 4 x 100 metres relay.

== Education ==
Poh studied at Anglo-Chinese School (Independent) (ACS(I)). As of December 2005, he is an undergraduate at the Singapore Management University.

== Career ==
In 1997, Poh broke Singapore's Schools' National 100-metre race record set by Ridzuan Rahim in 1995 with 11.68sec, 0.16sec faster, during the sixth Western Australia, Singapore and Malaysia Schools' International Track and Field Championships. The record was not recognised in Singapore.

Poh also played rugby for ACS(I) as a winger, winning the National Schools 'C' title in 1997 and National Schools 'B' titles twice in 1998 and 1999. He also won the National Youth League Under-14 title with Blacks RFC.

In 1999, Poh represented Singapore at the Philippine Open in the men's 4x100-metre event. The team won the silver medal behind Malaysia. The result was affected by a poor baton change between starter Tan Wei Leong and second runner Poh. Poh finished fourth in the men's 200m event.

Poh, alongside with Aaron Huang, Yusof Alias and U.K. Shyam, was set to be sent to the 1999 SEA Games, held at Brunei, for the men's 4x100-metre event, pending achieving qualification results. A time trial was set up for the team to qualify but due to an injury and an illness to two team members before a time trial, the trial was postponed. The team failed to participate at the Selangor Open due to an injury to Shyam. A special time trial was set up to replace the previous time trial at the annual inter-club championships which they failed to complete all the three attempts due to unsuccessful baton changes.

Participating in the 2004 Summer Olympics, Poh achieved seventh place in his 100 metres heat, thus missing out on a placing in Round 2 of the event.

In 2009, Poh started working for Singapore Airlines as a pilot.

Poh was Singapore Athletics' (SA) vice-president (finance & partnerships). On 18 March 2020, Poh and SA's athletes' commission representative Gary Yeo, who was recommended by Poh, resigned from the management committee of SA. Both resignations were rejected by SA's management committee. The management committee then banned Poh from holding any office within the jurisdiction of the association and/or its affiliates for two terms, based on the findings of a board of inquiry (BOI) on an incident of a WhatsApp chat leak. The management committee had "unanimously agreed" with the findings of the BOI which allegedly concluded Poh was the one who leaked a message. Poh denied he was the one who leaked the message and he was not the whistleblower in an internal dispute.

Poh then applied for a judicial review in the High Court of Singapore against SA, appealing against the BOI findings and requested for an open appeal hearing. On 17 September, Poh and the management committee, withdrew his application for judicial review and the ban on Poh, respectively following a mediation session. It remained unconfirmed whether did Poh leak the message.

In 2020, Poh was appointed as athletes' commission representative in SA.

== Personal life ==
Poh married his girlfriend of six years, and fellow runner, Dipna Lim Prasad in 2014. They have two children together.
