= 2003 Asian Athletics Championships – Men's 4 × 100 metres relay =

Relay event held in Manila, Philippines

The men's 4 × 100 metres relay event at the 2003 Asian Athletics Championships was held in Manila, Philippines on September 21–23.

== Results ==
=== Heats ===
Rank	Heat	Nation	Time	Notes
1	1	Japan	39.54	Q
2	1	China	39.63	Q
3	1	India	39.93	Q
4	1	Hong Kong	40.42	q
5	1	Oman	40.46	

=== Final ===
Rank	Nation	Time	Notes
1st place, gold medalist(s)	China	39.22	
2nd place, silver medalist(s)	Thailand	39.57	
3rd place, bronze medalist(s)	Japan	39.59	
4	India	39.69	
5	Hong Kong	40.07	
6	Sri Lanka	40.29	
