= Chen Haijian =

Chinese sprinter (born 1980)

Personal information
- Born: April 5, 1980 (age 46) Zhuhai, Guangdong, China

Sport
- Sport: Track and field
Medal record
Representing China
Asian Games
Bronze medal – third place	2002 Busan	100 m
Bronze medal – third place	2002 Busan	4x100 m relay
Asian Championships
Gold medal – first place	2003 Manila	100 m
Gold medal – first place	2003 Manila	4×100 m relay
East Asian Games
Silver medal – second place	2001 Osaka	100 m

Chen Haijian (simplified Chinese: 陈海健; traditional Chinese: 陳海健; pinyin: Chén Hǎijiàn; Jyutping: Chan4 Hoi2 Gin6; born April 5, 1980) is a Chinese athlete specializing in the 100 metres. His personal best time is 10.17 seconds, achieved in Shanghai in September 2003.

Participating in the 2004 Summer Olympics, he achieved fifth place in his 100 metres heat, thus missing out on a placing in Round 2 of the event. His best international performances have been a gold medal at the 2003 Asian Championships and a bronze medal at the 2002 Asian Games.

His interests include music and computers.

== Achievements ==
Year	Competition	Venue	Position	Notes
Representing China
2001	East Asian Games	Osaka, Japan	2nd	100 m
2003	Asian Championships	Manila, Philippines	1st	100 m
