= Salem Al-Yami =

Saudi Arabian sprinter (born 1982)

Medal record

Men's athletics

Representing Saudi Arabia

Asian Championships
Silver medal – second place	2002 Colombo	4×100 m
Bronze medal – third place	2000 Jakarta	4×100 m
Bronze medal – third place	2002 Colombo	100 m
Bronze medal – third place	2003 Manila	100 m

Salem Mubarak Al-Yami (Arabic: سالم اليامي; born February 9, 1982) is a Saudi Arabian sprinter specializing in the 100 metres.

He won a silver medal at the 2000 World Junior Championships, bronze medals at the 2002 and 2003 Asian Championships, and gold medals at the 2005 Islamic Solidarity Games as well as the 2001 and 2003 Pan Arab Championships.

Participating in the 2004 Summer Olympics, he achieved fourth place in his 100 metres heat, narrowly failing to qualify for the second round.

== Competition record ==
Year	Competition	Venue	Position	Event	Notes
Representing Saudi Arabia
1999	World Youth Championships	Bydgoszcz, Poland	5th	100 m	10.51
1999	World Youth Championships	Bydgoszcz, Poland	5th	200 m	21.54
1999	World Championships	Seville, Spain	53rd (h)	200 m	21.27
2000	Asian Championships	Jakarta, Indonesia	7th	200 m	21.36
2000	Olympic Games	Sydney, Australia	30th (h)	4 × 100 m relay	39.94
2000	World Junior Championships	Santiago, Chile	2nd	100m	10.38 (wind: +0.1 m/s)
2000	World Junior Championships	Santiago, Chile	9th (sf)	200m	20.95 (wind: +1.2 m/s)
2001	World Championships	Edmonton, Canada	28th (h)	100 m	10.21
2001	World Championships	Edmonton, Canada	38th (h)	200 m	21.03
2001	World Championships	Edmonton, Canada	9th (sf)	4 × 100 m relay	39.04
2002	Asian Championships	Colombo, Sri Lanka	3rd	100 m	10.52
2002	Asian Championships	Colombo, Sri Lanka	2nd	4 × 100 m relay	39.16
2003	World Indoor Championships	Birmingham, United Kingdom	35th (h)	60 m	6.79
2003	World Championships	Paris, France	46th (h)	100 m	10.51
2003	World Championships	Paris, France	–	4 × 100 m relay	DNF
2003	Asian Championships	Manila, Philippines	3rd	100 m	10.28
2004	Olympic Games	Athens, Greece	38th (h)	100 m	10.36
2004	Pan Arab Games	Algiers, Algeria	2nd	100 m	10.39
2004	Pan Arab Games	Algiers, Algeria	1st	4 × 100 m relay	39.40
2005	Islamic Solidarity Games	Mecca, Saudi Arabia	1st	100 m	10.21
2005	Islamic Solidarity Games	Mecca, Saudi Arabia	1st	4 × 100 m relay	39.80
2005	World Championships	Helsinki, Finland	24th (qf)	100 m	10.48
2006	Asian Games	Doha, Qatar	6th	4 × 100 m relay	40.18
2007	Pan Arab Games	Cairo, Egypt	1st	4 × 100 m relay	39.99
