= Vissanu Sophanich =

Thai sprinter (born 1974)

Personal information
- Born: July 4, 1974 (age 52)

Sport
- Sport: Track and field
Medal record
Representing Thailand
Asian Games
| Gold medal – first place | 2002 Busan | 4x100 m relay |
| Silver medal – second place | 1998 Bangkok | 4x100 m relay |
Asian Championships
| Gold medal – first place | 2000 Jakarta | 4×100 m relay |
| Gold medal – first place | 2002 Colombo | 4×100 m relay |
| Bronze medal – third place | 1993 Manila | 4×100 m relay |

Vissanu Sophanich (born July 4, 1974) is a track and field sprint athlete who competed internationally for Thailand. He was on the Thai team in the Men's 4 x 100 metre relay at the 2000 Summer Olympics.

His best time is 10.38 seconds (2000 Asian Athletics Championships, Jakarta, 2000). He holds the national 4-man relay record of 38.80 seconds, also in Jakarta on August 31, 2000, a performance which won the gold medal at the 2000 Asian Athletics Championships (relay team members: Kongdech Natenee, Vissanu Sophanich, Ekkachai Janthana, Sittichai Suwonprateep).

== See also ==
- 2001 World Championships in Athletics – Men's 4 x 100 metres relay.
- Thai records in athletics
