= Nazmizan Mohamad =

Malaysian sprinter (born 1981)

Personal information
- Nationality: Malaysian
- Born: 4 April 1981 (age 45) Dungun, Terengganu

Sport
- Sport: Sprinting
- Events: 100 metres, 200 metres, 4 x 100 metres relay
Medal record
Men's athletics
Representing Malaysia
World Youth Games
Bronze medal – third place	1998 Moscow	4×100 metres relay
Southeast Asian Games
Gold medal – first place	2003 Hanoi	100 m
Gold medal – first place	2003 Hanoi	200 m

Nazmizan Mohamad (born 4 April 1981) is a Malaysian sprinter. He competed in the men's 200 metres at the 2004 Summer Olympics.
