= Mohammed Al-Hooti =

Omani sprinter (born 1972)

Personal information
- Nationality: Omani
- Born: 8 September 1972 (age 53)

Sport
- Sport: Sprinting
- Event: 200 metres
Medal record
Men's athletics
Representing Oman
Asian Championships
Bronze medal – third place	2000 Jakarta	200 m

Mohammed Al-Hooti (born 8 September 1972) is an Omani sprinter. He competed in the 200 metres at the 1996 Summer Olympics and the 2000 Summer Olympics.
