= U. K. Shyam =

Singaporean sprinter

Personal information
- Full name: Umaglia Kancanangai Shyam Dhuleep
- Born: 1 July 1976 (age 50)
- Years active: 1992 - 2005

Sport
- Sport: Track and field
Medal record
Men's athletics
Representing Singapore
Southeast Asian Games
Silver medal – second place	2001 Kuala Lumpur	100 m
Silver medal – second place	2003 Vietnam	4x100 m relay
Bronze medal – third place	1997 Jakarta	4x100 m relay
Bronze medal – third place	2005 Manila	4x100 m relay

Umaglia Kancanangai Shyam Dhuleep (born 1 July 1976), commonly known as U. K. Shyam, is a retired Singaporean track and field athlete and former national 100m record holder of Singapore.

He attended St. Andrew's Secondary School and Raffles Junior College, and went on to do a double degree in Philosophy and Political Science at the National University of Singapore.

He held the Singaporean national record over the 100m with a timing of 10.37s for 22 years. He broke the 33-year-old record of 10.38s (set by C. Kunalan) at the World University Games in Beijing in 2001. He equalled his own national record soon after at the 2001 Southeast Asian Games in Kuala Lumpur.

== Athletics career ==
Shyam joined the national track and field team in 1992.

At the 1997 Southeast Asian Games, Shyam won the bronze medal in the 4×100 metres relay.

In 2000, he quit the national team after a dispute over his education funding but rejoined the team in 2001. He went on to win the Hong Kong Open with 10.45s and qualified for the 2001 Southeast Asian Games in Kuala Lumpur. He clinched the silver medal in the 100m race with 10.37s, equalling the national record he created earlier in the year.

In 2003, Shyam took part in the 2003 Southeast Asian Games and won the silver medal in the 4×100 metres relay with Lin Jingze, Hamkah Afik and Poh Seng Song.

At the 2005 Southeast Asian Games, Shyam won the bronze medal in the 4×100 metres relay.

He retired from athletics in 2005.

== Post athletics career ==
After retirement from sprinting, Shyam went on to teach philosophy at a junior college. He subsequently became a teacher at Raffles Institution.

In 2018, Shyam released a book, written by former national sprinter Kenneth Khoo, Running On Empty: The Story Behind 0.01s, detailing his athletics career. Shyam and Khoo donated their royalties from the book to the Chiam See Tong Sports Fund.

== Personal life ==
Shyam is married to Chia Hui Ping.

== Achievements ==
- Obtained IAAF world ranking in Men's 100m in 2001
- Qualified for Athens Olympics 2004 – B qualifier
- Ranked 2nd in Southeast Asia for the 100m Men's Sprint event in 2001
- Asian Games 2002 (Korea, Busan) 100m Men's sprint event Semi-finalist
- 23rd SEA Games (Manila, 2005) – 100m Men's sprint event Finalist
- 1st athlete to be placed on Singapore Sports Council's inaugural Athlete Career Training Programme (ACT Scheme) Programme was launched and conferred by then Deputy Prime Minister Goh Chok Tong.
- Ranked 1st in Singapore for the 100m Men's Sprint event from 2001 to 2003
- Singapore Sports Council Awards Meritorious Award winner (Senior) 2001
- Individual Award Recipient for Sporting Singapore Inspiration Awards 2006.
- Winner of the Public Sports Medal 2011
- Holland Village Celebrity Silver Medal Winner 2011 "Poser Fun Award Category"
- Singapore 100m record holder (2001–2023)

== Ambassadorships and scholarships ==
- Recipient of International Olympic Council (IOC) Olympic Solidarity Fund Scholarship 2002
- Tag Heuer Ambassador for Singapore (2001–2003)
- NIKE Ambassador for Singapore (1994, 1995, 2001 – present)
- Anti-Smoking Campaign Ambassador for Singapore (2002)
- One of the Ambassadors for Singapore Sports School

== Bibliography ==
- Shyam, U. K.; Khoo, Kenneth (2018). Running on Empty: The Story Behind 0.01s. Ethos Books. ISBN 978-981-11-7001-0.
