= Ho Kwan Lung =

Hong Kong sprinter (born 1976)

Personal information
- Nationality: Hong Konger
- Born: 27 November 1976 (age 49)

Chinese name
- Traditional Chinese: 何君龍
- Simplified Chinese: 何君龙
- Hanyu Pinyin: Hé Jūnlóng
- Yale Romanization: Hòh Gwānlùhng

Sport
- Sport: Sprinting
- Event: 4 × 100 metres relay

Ho Kwan Lung (born 27 November 1976) is a Hong Kong sprinter. He competed in the men's 4 × 100 metres relay at the 2000 Summer Olympics. He later became a coach at Fung Kai No. 1 Secondary School.
