= 2002 Asian Athletics Championships =

2002 Asian Championships
- Dates: 9–12 August
- Host city: Colombo, Sri Lanka
- Events: 43

The 14th Asian Athletics Championships were held in Colombo, Sri Lanka on 9–12 August 2002.

== Results ==
=== Men ===
| Event | Gold | | Silver | | Bronze | |
|---|---|---|---|---|---|---|
| 100 metres | Jamal Al-Saffar; Saudi Arabia | 10.43 | Gennadiy Chernovol; Kazakhstan | 10.50 | Salem Mubarak Al-Yami; Saudi Arabia | 10.52 |
| 200 metres | Gennadiy Chernovol; Kazakhstan | 20.73 | Fawzi Al-Shammari; Kuwait | 20.92 | Sittichai Suwonprateep; Thailand | 21.04 |
| 400 metres | Fawzi Al-Shammari; Kuwait | 45.21 | Hamdan Obah Al-Bishi; Saudi Arabia | 45.43 | Sugath Tillakaratne; Sri Lanka | 45.73 |
| 800 metres | Mihail Kolganov; Kazakhstan | 1:48.91 | Salem Amer Al-Badri; Qatar | 1:48.95 | Adam Abdu Adam Ali; Qatar | 1:49.25 |
| 1500 metres | Abdulrahman Sulaiman; Qatar | 3:45.98 | Rashid Ramzi; Bahrain | 3:46.41 | Jamal Noor Yousef; Qatar | 3:46.85 |
| 5000 metres | Khamis Seif Abdullah; Qatar | 14:16.81 | Abdulhak Zakaria; Bahrain | 14:19.92 | Nasser Sulaiman; Qatar | 14:19.97 |
| 10,000 metres | Ahmed Ibrahim Warsama; Qatar | 30:19.62 | Aman Majid Awadh; Qatar | 30:21.05 | Jagannath Lakade; India | 30:39.44 |
| 3000 metres steeplechase | Khamis Seif Abdullah; Qatar | 8:16.0 | Saad Shadad Al-Asmari; Saudi Arabia | 8:16.7 | Ali Abu Bakr Kamal; Qatar | 8:37.4 |
| 110 metres hurdles | Liu Xiang; China | 13.56 | Mubarak Ata Mubarak; Saudi Arabia | 13.96 | Mohamed Faiz; Malaysia | 14.33 |
| 400 metres hurdles | Mubarak Al-Nubi; Qatar | 48.67 CR | Hideaki Kawamura; Japan | 48.85 | Yevgeniy Meleshenko; Kazakhstan | 49.56 |
| 20 kilometres walk | Eiichi Yoshizawa; Japan | 1:26:51 | Toshihito Fujinohara; Japan | 1:28:06 | Shin Il-yong; South Korea | 1:31:07 |
| 4 × 100 metres relay | Thailand; Sittichai Suwonprateep; Ekkachai Janthana; Vissanu Sophanich; Reanchai Srihawong | 38.99 | Saudi Arabia; Khalifa Al-Sagar; Salem Al-Yami; Mubarak Mubarak; Jamal Al-Saffar | 39.16 | Qatar; Mohd Sultan Al-Sheeb; Khalid Yousuf Al-Obaidi; Abdullah Khamis Al-Hamad; Khalid Habash Al-Suwaidi | 39.39 |
| 4 × 400 metres relay | Sri Lanka; Rohan Pradeep Kumara; Ranga Wimalawansa; Prasanna Amarasekara; Sugath Thilakaratne | 3:03.35 | India; Satbir Singh; K. Suresh; Anil Kumar Rohil; Jata Shankar | 3:06.76 | Japan; Suguru Matsumoto; Yukihiro Mukai; Yoshihiro Chiba; Hideaki Kawamura | 3:07.09 |
| High jump | Cui Kai; China | 2.19 | Salem Nasser Bakhit; Bahrain | 2.15 | Loo Kum Zee; Malaysia | 2.15 |
| Pole vault | Daichi Sawano; Japan | 5.40 | Kim Se-in; South Korea | 5.40 | Grigoriy Yegorov; Kazakhstan | 5.20 |
| Long jump | Hussein Taher Al-Sabee; Saudi Arabia | 8.09 | Cai Xiaobao; China | 7.95w | Huang Le; China | 7.91w |
| Triple jump | Mouled Salem Al-Ahmadi; Saudi Arabia | 16.61 | Kazuyoshi Ishikawa; Japan | 16.42 | Mohammed Hamdi Awadh; Qatar | 16.18 |
| Shot put | Bilal Saad Mubarak; Qatar | 19.22 | Navpreet Singh; India | 18.97 | Kim Jae-il; South Korea | 17.98 |
| Discus throw | Rashid Shafi Al-Dosari; Qatar | 64.43 CR | Abbas Samimi; Iran | 60.49 | Nuer Maimaiti; China | 60.39 |
| Hammer throw | Koji Murofushi; Japan | 80.45 CR | Hiroaki Doi; Japan | 70.27 | Viktor Ustinov; Uzbekistan | 69.25 |
| Javelin throw | Li Rongxiang; China | 82.75 CR | Sergey Voynov; Uzbekistan | 79.70 | Park Jae-myong; South Korea | 79.22 |
| Decathlon | Ahmed Hassan Moussa; Qatar | 7670 pts | Pavel Andreev; Uzbekistan | 7428 pts | Takuro Hirata; Japan | 7344 pts |
WR world record | AR area record | CR championship record | GR games record | NR national record | OR Olympic record | PB personal best | SB season best | WL world leading (in a given season)

=== Women ===
| Event | Gold | | Silver | | Bronze | |
|---|---|---|---|---|---|---|
| 100 metres | Susanthika Jayasinghe; Sri Lanka | 11.29 CR | Qin Wangping; China | 11.56 | Lyubov Perepelova; Uzbekistan | 11.60 |
| 200 metres | Susanthika Jayasinghe; Sri Lanka | 22.84 =CR | Lyubov Perepelova; Uzbekistan | 23.76 | Yan Jiankui; China | 23.85 |
| 400 metres | Tatyana Roslanova; Kazakhstan | 52.61 | Zamira Amirova; Uzbekistan | 53.87 | Nguyen Thi Tinh; Vietnam | 54.57 |
| 800 metres | Miho Sugimori; Japan | 2:03.59 | Tatyana Borisova; Kyrgyzstan | 2:03.67 | Zamira Amirova; Uzbekistan | 2:04.48 |
| 1500 metres | Tatyana Borisova; Kyrgyzstan | 4:16.27 | Svetlana Lukasheva; Kazakhstan | 4:18.63 | Mizuho Nasukawa; Japan | 4:19.27 |
| 5000 metres | Ham Bong-Sil; North Korea | 15:42.88 | Akiko Kawashima; Japan | 15:44.08 | Mizuho Nasukawa; Japan | 16:24.63 |
| 10,000 metres | Ham Bong-Sil; North Korea | 34:44.92 | Jo Bun-Hui; North Korea | 35:00.63 | Lashram Aruna Devi; India | 35:38.70 |
| 100 metres hurdles | Yvonne Kanazawa; Japan | 13.40 | Sriyani Kulawansa; Sri Lanka | 13.43 | Trecia Roberts; Thailand | 13.60 |
| 400 metres hurdles | Natalya Torshina; Kazakhstan | 55.81 | Song Yinglan; China | 56.49 | Makiko Yoshida; Japan | 57.04 |
| 20 kilometres walk | Gao Kelian; China | 1:36:57 | Jian Xingli; China | 1:37:02 | Ryoko Tadamasa; Japan | 1:42:43 |
| 4 × 100 metres relay | China; Ni Xiaoli; Yan Jiankui; Huang Mei; Qin Wangping | 43.94 | Uzbekistan; Guzel Khubbieva; Anza Kazakova; Ludmila Dmitriadi; Lyubov Perepelova | 44.85 | Thailand; Trecia Roberts; Oramoch Klomdee; Supawadee Khawpeag; Juthamass Thawonchavoen | 44.89 |
| 4 × 400 metres relay | India; J.J. Shobha; Soma Biswas; Sunita Dahiya; Sagardeep Kaur | 3:37.48 | Japan; Miho Sugimori; Mayu Kida; Sakie Nobuoka; Makiko Yoshida | 3:38.29 | Sri Lanka; Menaka Wickremasinghe; Lalani Gunawardena; Swarnamali Edirisinghe; Damayanthi Dharsha | 3:42.71 |
| High jump | Tatyana Efimenko; Kyrgyzstan | 1.92 | Bobby Aloysius; India | 1.84 | Marina Korzhova; Kazakhstan | 1.84 |
| Pole vault | Gao Shuying; China | 4.20 CR | Masumi Ono; Japan | 4.20 CR | Ni Putu Desy Margawati; Indonesia | 4.10 NR |
| Long jump | Yelena Kashcheyeva; Kazakhstan | 6.61 | Lerma Gabito; Philippines | 6.40w | Marestella Torres; Philippines | 6.40w |
| Triple jump | Wu Lingmei; China | 13.83 | Mariya Sokova; Uzbekistan | 13.81 | Yelena Parfenova; Kazakhstan | 13.11 |
| Shot put | Juthaporn Krasaeyan; Thailand | 18.05 | Cheng Xiaoyan; China | 17.39 | Sumi Ichioka; Japan | 16.12 |
| Discus throw | Li Yanfeng; China | 60.06 | Harwant Kaur; India | 57.60 | Swaranjeet Kaur; India | 55.05 |
| Hammer throw | Gu Yuan; China | 71.10 CR | Huang Chih-Feng; Chinese Taipei | 58.19 | Hardeep Kaur; India | 57.82 |
| Javelin throw | Ma Ning; China | 57.15 | Xue Juan; China | 56.04 | Lee Young-Sun; South Korea | 53.72 |
| Heptathlon | Svetlana Kazanina; Kazakhstan | 5841 pts | J. J. Shobha; India | 5775 pts | Wang Hailan; China | 5635 pts |
WR world record | AR area record | CR championship record | GR games record | NR national record | OR Olympic record | PB personal best | SB season best | WL world leading (in a given season)

== Medal table ==
* Host nation (Sri Lanka)

| Rank | Nation | Gold | Silver | Bronze | Total |
|---|---|---|---|---|---|
| 1 | China | 10 | 6 | 4 | 20 |
| 2 | Qatar | 8 | 2 | 6 | 16 |
| 3 | Kazakhstan | 6 | 2 | 4 | 12 |
| 4 | Japan | 5 | 7 | 7 | 19 |
| 5 | Saudi Arabia | 3 | 4 | 1 | 8 |
| 6 | Sri Lanka* | 3 | 1 | 2 | 6 |
| 7 | Kyrgyzstan | 2 | 1 | 0 | 3 |
| 7 | North Korea | 2 | 1 | 0 | 3 |
| 9 | Thailand | 2 | 0 | 3 | 5 |
| 10 | India | 1 | 5 | 4 | 10 |
| 11 | Kuwait | 1 | 1 | 0 | 2 |
| 12 | Uzbekistan | 0 | 6 | 3 | 9 |
| 13 | Bahrain | 0 | 3 | 0 | 3 |
| 14 | South Korea | 0 | 1 | 4 | 5 |
| 15 | Philippines | 0 | 1 | 1 | 2 |
| 16 | Chinese Taipei | 0 | 1 | 0 | 1 |
| 16 | Iran | 0 | 1 | 0 | 1 |
| 18 | Malaysia | 0 | 0 | 2 | 2 |
| 19 | Indonesia | 0 | 0 | 1 | 1 |
| 19 | Vietnam | 0 | 0 | 1 | 1 |
| Totals (20 entries) | | 43 | 43 | 43 | 129 |

== See also ==
- 2002 in athletics (track and field)
