= Hamoud Al-Dalhami =

Omani sprinter (born 1971)

Personal information
- Full name: Hamoud Abdallah Said; Al-Dalhami
- Nationality: Oman
- Born: 7 November 1971 (age 55) Muscat, Oman
- Height: 1.72 m (5 ft 7 1/2 in)
- Weight: 65 kg (143 lb)

Sport
- Sport: Athletics
- Event: Sprint

Achievements and titles
- Personal bests: 100 m: 10.44 (1999); 200 m: 20.94 (1999)

Hamoud Abdallah Said Al-Dalhami (Arabic: حمود عبد الله سيد الدلهمي; born November 7, 1971, in Muscat) is a retired Omani sprinter, who specialized in both 100 and 200 metres. He represented Oman in two editions of the Olympic Games (2000 and 2004), and also attained personal bests of 10.44 (100 metres) and 20.94 (200 metres) from the 1999 Pan Arab Championships in Beirut, Lebanon.

Al-Dalhami made his official debut at the 2000 Summer Olympics in Sydney, where he competed as a member of the Omani track and field team in the men's 4 × 100 m relay. Running the second leg in heat four, Al-Dalhami delivered the Omani foursome a seasonal best and a sixth-place time in 39.82, but finished twenty-eighth overall from the prelims.

At the 2002 Asian Games in Busan, South Korea, Al-Dalhami finished eighth in the 200 metres with a time of 21.25, trailing behind Japan's Shingo Suetsugu by almost a full second.

Four years after competing in his last Olympics, Al-Dalhami qualified for his second Omani team in the men's 200 metres at the 2004 Summer Olympics in Athens by receiving a wild card invitation from IAAF without an entry time. Running against seven other athletes in heat four, Al-Dalhami surpassed Japan's Ryo Matsuda to take the seventh spot by a full three-second gap in 21.82. Al-Dalhami failed to advance into the semifinals as he placed farther from two automatic slots for the next round and shared a forty-ninth overall position with Swaziland's Mphelave Dlamini from the prelims. Al-Dalhami was also appointed by the Oman Olympic Committee to carry the nation's flag in the opening ceremony.
