= Ekkachai Janthana =

Thai sprinter (born 1977)

Personal information
- Nationality: Thai
- Born: 10 February 1977 (age 49)

Sport
- Sport: Sprinting
- Event: 4 × 100 metres relay
Medal record
Men's athletics
Representing Thailand
Asian Games
Gold medal – first place	2002 Busan	4x100 m relay
Gold medal – first place	2006 Doha	4x100 m relay
Asian Championships
Gold medal – first place	2000 Jakarta	4×100 m relay
Gold medal – first place	2002 Colombo	4×100 m relay
Silver medal – second place	2005 Incheon	4×100 m relay

Ekkachai Janthana (born 10 February 1977) is a Thai sprinter. He competed in the men's 4 × 100 metres relay at the 1996 Summer Olympics.
