= Athletics at the 1998 Asian Games – Men's 4 × 400 metres relay =

Men's 4 × 400 metres relay at the 1998 Asian Games
- Venue: Thammasat Stadium
- Dates: 18–19 December 1998
- Competitors: 44 from 10 nations

Medalists
| gold medal | Japan; Shunji Karube, Jun Osakada, Masayoshi Kan, Kenji Tabata |
| silver medal | India; Purukottam Ramachandran, Jata Shankar, Lijo David Thottan, Paramjit Singh |
| bronze medal | South Korea; Kim Jae-da, Kim Yong-hwan, Kim Ho, Shon Ju-il |

The men's 4 × 400 metres relay competition at the 1998 Asian Games in Bangkok, Thailand was held on 18 and 19 December at the Thammasat Stadium.

== Schedule ==
All times are Indochina Time (UTC+07:00)

| Date | Time | Event |
|---|---|---|
| Friday, 18 December 1998 | 17:30 | Heats |
| Saturday, 19 December 1998 | 16:20 | Final |

== Results ==
=== Heats ===
- Qualification: First 3 in each heat (Q) and the next 2 fastest (q) advance to the final.

==== Heat 1 ====
| Rank | Team | Time | Notes |
|---|---|---|---|
| 1 | Japan (JPN); Shunji Karube; Jun Osakada; Masayoshi Kan; Kenji Tabata | 3:04.25 | Q |
| 2 | India (IND); Lijo David Thottan; Jata Shankar; Dinesh Rawat; Purukottam Ramachandran | 3:04.86 | Q |
| 3 | Kuwait (KUW); Khaled Al-Johar; Mishal Al-Harbi; Musayed Al-Azimi; Fawzi Al-Shammari | 3:07.99 | Q |
| 4 | Chinese Taipei (TPE); Chen Tien-wen; Lee Ching-yen; Lin Chin-fu; Chang Po-chih | 3:08.08 | q |
| 5 | Oman (OMA); Mansoor Al-Anbari; Hamoud Al-Dalhami; Hamoud Al-Hashimi; Abdullah Mohammed Al-Anbari | 3:13.96 | |

==== Heat 2 ====
- Wind: +0.6 m/s

| Rank | Team | Time | Notes |
|---|---|---|---|
| 1 | Thailand (THA); Chalermpol Noohlong; Senee Kongtong; Narong Nilploy; Jirachai Linglom | 3:07.36 | Q |
| 2 | South Korea (KOR); Kim Ho; Kim Yong-hwan; Shon Ju-il; Kim Jae-da | 3:07.67 | Q |
| 3 | Qatar (QAT); Sami Al-Abdullah; Fareh Ibrahim Ali; Masoud Khamis Rahman; Ali Ismail Doka | 3:08.11 | Q |
| 4 | Malaysia (MAS); Zaiful Zainal Abidin; Romzi Bakar; Nadarajan Devarajo; Yazid Parlan | 3:09.01 | q |
| 5 | Sri Lanka (SRI); Rohan Pradeep Kumara; W. M. S. K. Wijetunge; Suminda Mendis; Ratna Kumar | 3:13.66 | |

=== Final ===
| Rank | Team | Time | Notes |
|---|---|---|---|
| 1st place, gold medalist(s) | Japan (JPN); Shunji Karube; Jun Osakada; Masayoshi Kan; Kenji Tabata | 3:01.70 | GR |
| 2nd place, silver medalist(s) | India (IND); Purukottam Ramachandran; Jata Shankar; Lijo David Thottan; Paramjit Singh | 3:02.62 | |
| 3rd place, bronze medalist(s) | South Korea (KOR); Kim Jae-da; Kim Yong-hwan; Kim Ho; Shon Ju-il | 3:05.72 | |
| 4 | Kuwait (KUW); Khaled Al-Johar; Mishal Al-Harbi; Musayed Al-Azimi; Fawzi Al-Shammari | 3:05.75 | |
| 5 | Qatar (QAT); Masoud Khamis Rahman; Fareh Ibrahim Ali; Sami Al-Abdullah; Ibrahim Ismail Muftah | 3:06.51 | |
| 6 | Thailand (THA); Wirat Sarad; Narong Nilploy; Chalermpol Noohlong; Senee Kongtong | 3:07.34 | |
| 7 | Chinese Taipei (TPE); Chen Tien-wen; Chang Po-chih; Lin Chin-fu; Lee Ching-yen | 3:07.61 | |
| 8 | Malaysia (MAS); Nadarajan Devarajo; Romzi Bakar; Vasu Subramaniam; Yazid Parlan | 3:10.31 | |
