= Athletics at the 2002 Asian Games – Men's 4 × 400 metres relay =

Men's 4 × 400 metres relay at the 2002 Asian Games
- Venue: Busan Asiad Main Stadium
- Dates: 12–13 October 2002
- Competitors: 40 from 9 nations

Medalists
gold medal	Saudi Arabia; Hamed Al-Bishi, Hadi Soua'an Al-Somaily, Mohammed Al-Salhi, Hamdan Al-Bishi
silver medal	India; Purukottam Ramachandran, K. J. Manoj Lal, Satvir Singh, Bhupinder Singh
bronze medal	Sri Lanka; Rohan Pradeep Kumara, Ranga Wimalawansa, Prasanna Amarasekara, Sugath Thilakaratne

The men's 4 × 400 metres relay competition at the 2002 Asian Games in Busan, South Korea was held on 12 and 13 October at the Busan Asiad Main Stadium.

== Schedule ==
All times are Korea Standard Time (UTC+09:00)

Date	Time	Event
Saturday, 12 October 2002	15:30	1st round
Sunday, 13 October 2002	11:00	Final

== Records ==
Prior to this competition, the existing world, Asian and Games records were as follows.

World Record	~~United States~~; United States	~~2:54.20~~; 2:54.29	~~Uniondale, United States~~; Stuttgart, Germany	~~22 July 1998~~; 22 August 1993
Asian Record	Japan	3:00.76	Atlanta, United States	3 August 1996
Games Record	Japan	3:01.70	Bangkok, Thailand	19 December 1998

- United States's world record was rescinded in 2008.

== Results ==
Legend

- DNS — Did not start
- DSQ — Disqualified

=== 1st round ===
- Qualification: First 3 in each heat (Q) and the next 2 fastest (q) advance to the final.

==== Heat 1 ====
Rank	Team	Time	Notes
1	Sri Lanka (SRI); Rohan Pradeep Kumara; Ranga Wimalawansa; Prasanna Amarasekara; Sugath Thilakaratne	3:04.75	Q
2	India (IND); Jata Shankar; Paramjit Singh; Satvir Singh; Bhupinder Singh	3:06.14	Q
3	Philippines (PHI); Jimar Aing; Ernie Candelario; Ronnie Marfil; Rodrigo Tanuan	3:08.68	Q
4	Qatar (QAT); Sulaiman Hamid Osman; Mohammed Abdulrahman Musa; Yasir Mohammed Abubaker; Salaheddine Al-Safi	3:09.54	q
5	South Korea (KOR); Lee Du-yeon; Lee Sang-bong; Kim Do-sun; Lee Jae-hun	3:12.11	

==== Heat 2 ====
Rank	Team	Time	Notes
1	Saudi Arabia (KSA); Ibrahim Al-Hamaidi; Hadi Soua'an Al-Somaily; Mohammed Al-Salhi; Hamed Al-Bishi	3:06.02	Q
2	Japan (JPN); Ken Yoshizawa; Masayuki Okusako; Dai Tamesue; Kenji Tabata	3:06.73	Q
3	China (CHN); Yang Yaozu; Han Chaoming; Ni Zhenjie; Liang Chao	3:09.68	Q
4	Thailand (THA); Jirachai Linglom; Weera Kongsri; Banjong Lachua; Narong Nilploy	3:10.04	q

=== Final ===
Rank	Team	Time	Notes
1st place, gold medalist(s)	Saudi Arabia (KSA); Hamed Al-Bishi; Hadi Soua'an Al-Somaily; Mohammed Al-Salhi; Hamdan Al-Bishi	3:02.47	
2nd place, silver medalist(s)	India (IND); Purukottam Ramachandran; K. J. Manoj Lal; Satvir Singh; Bhupinder Singh	3:04.22	
3rd place, bronze medalist(s)	Sri Lanka (SRI); Rohan Pradeep Kumara; Ranga Wimalawansa; Prasanna Amarasekara; Sugath Thilakaratne	3:04.37	
4	Japan (JPN); Masayuki Okusako; Kenji Tabata; Ken Yoshizawa; Dai Tamesue	3:05.85	
5	China (CHN); Yang Yaozu; Han Chaoming; Ni Zhenjie; Liang Chao	3:07.26	
6	Philippines (PHI); Jimar Aing; Ernie Candelario; Ronnie Marfil; Rodrigo Tanuan	3:08.29	
—	Thailand (THA); Jirachai Linglom; Senee Kongtong; Banjong Lachua; Narong Nilploy	DSQ	
—	Qatar (QAT); Sulaiman Hamid Osman; Mohammed Abdulrahman Musa; Yasir Mohammed Abubaker; Salaheddine Al-Safi	DNS	
