= Athletics at the 1998 Asian Games =

- Venue: Thammasat Stadium
- Dates: 6–20 December 1998
- Competitors: 451 from 37 nations

The athletics competition at the 1998 Asian Games were held in Thammasat Stadium, Bangkok, Thailand between 6 and 20 December 1998.

== Schedule ==
●	1st day	●	Final day	H	Heats	Q	Qualification	S	Semifinals	F	Final

Event↓/Date →	6th Sun	7th Mon	8th Tue	9th Wed	10th Thu	11th Fri	12th Sat	13th Sun		14th Mon	15th Tue	16th Wed	17th Thu		18th Fri	19th Sat	20th Sun
Men's 100 m								H	S	F							
Men's 200 m													H	S	F		
Men's 400 m								H	S	F							
Men's 800 m											H		F				
Men's 1500 m								H		F							
Men's 5000 m																F	
Men's 10,000 m								F									
Men's 110 m hurdles															H	F	
Men's 400 m hurdles											H		F				
Men's 3000 m steeplechase											F						
Men's 4 × 100 m relay											F						
Men's 4 × 400 m relay															H	F	
Men's marathon																	F
Men's 20 km walk								F									
Men's 50 km walk															F		
Men's high jump															F		
Men's pole vault											F						
Men's long jump										Q	F						
Men's triple jump																F	
Men's shot put										F							
Men's discus throw													F				
Men's hammer throw								F									
Men's javelin throw																F	
Men's decathlon													●		●		
Women's 100 m								H		F							
Women's 200 m													H		F		
Women's 400 m								H		F							
Women's 800 m											H		F				
Women's 1500 m										F							
Women's 5000 m															F		
Women's 10,000 m										F							
Women's 100 m hurdles																F	
Women's 400 m hurdles													F				
Women's 4 × 100 m relay											F						
Women's 4 × 400 m relay																F	
Women's marathon	F																
Women's 10,000 m walk										F							
Women's high jump								F									
Women's pole vault																F	
Women's long jump													F				
Women's triple jump															F		
Women's shot put											F						
Women's discus throw								F									
Women's javelin throw										F							
Women's heptathlon								●		●							

== Medalists ==
=== Men ===
Event	Gold		Silver		Bronze	
100 m	Koji Ito; Japan	10.05	Reanchai Seeharwong; Thailand	10.31	Yasukatsu Otsuki; Japan	10.31
200 m	Koji Ito; Japan	20.25; GR	Han Chaoming; China	20.70	Sugath Thilakaratne; Sri Lanka	20.83
400 m	Sugath Thilakaratne; Sri Lanka	44.99	Ibrahim Ismail Muftah; Qatar	45.32	Paramjit Singh; India	45.93
800 m	Lee Jin-il; South Korea	1:46.56	Kim Soon-hyung; South Korea	1:46.61	Abdulrahman Hassan Abdullah; Qatar	1:47.10
1500 m	Mohamed Suleiman; Qatar	3:40.03	Kim Soon-hyung; South Korea	3:40.56	Bahadur Prasad; India	3:41.48
5000 m	Mohamed Suleiman; Qatar	13:55.79	Ahmed Ibrahim Warsama; Qatar	13:56.65	Baek Seung-do; South Korea	13:57.11
10,000 m	Kenji Takao; Japan	28:45.66	Ahmed Ibrahim Warsama; Qatar	28:46.55	Gulab Chand; India	29:10.53
110 m hurdles	Chen Yanhao; China	13.65	Andrey Sklyarenko; Kazakhstan	13.86	Hamad Mubarak Al-Dosari; Qatar	13.99
400 m hurdles	Hideaki Kawamura; Japan	49.59	Yoshihiko Saito; Japan	49.94	Chen Tien-wen; Chinese Taipei	50.46
3000 m steeplechase	Yasunori Uchitomi; Japan	8:41.00	Hamid Sajjadi; Iran	8:42.53	Jafar Babakhani; Iran	8:55.04
4 × 100 m relay	Japan; Yasukatsu Otsuki; Shin Kubota; Hiroyasu Tsuchie; Koji Ito	38.91; GR	Thailand; Niti Piyapan; Reanchai Seeharwong; Worasit Vechaphut; Vissanu Sophanich	39.17	Oman; Hamoud Al-Dalhami; Mohammed Al-Hooti; Jahad Al-Sheikh; Ahmed Al-Moamari	40.26
4 × 400 m relay	Japan; Shunji Karube; Jun Osakada; Masayoshi Kan; Kenji Tabata	3:01.70; GR	India; Purukottam Ramachandran; Jata Shankar; Lijo David Thottan; Paramjit Singh	3:02.62	South Korea; Kim Jae-da; Kim Yong-hwan; Kim Ho; Shon Ju-il	3:05.72
Marathon	Lee Bong-ju; South Korea	2:12:32	Akira Manai; Japan	2:13:25	Kim Jung-won; North Korea	2:16:30
20 km walk	Yu Guohui; China	1:20:25; GR	Valeriy Borisov; Kazakhstan	1:23:52	Li Zewen; China	1:24:41
50 km walk	Wang Yinhang; China	3:59:26	Sergey Korepanov; Kazakhstan	3:59:27	Fumio Imamura; Japan	4:06:59
High jump	Lee Jin-taek; South Korea	2.27	Zhou Zhongge; China	2.23	Shigeki Toyoshima; Japan	2.19
High jump	Lee Jin-taek; South Korea	2.27	Zhou Zhongge; China	2.23	Loo Kum Zee; Malaysia	2.19
Pole vault	Igor Potapovich; Kazakhstan	5.55	Kim Chul-kyun; South Korea	5.40	Fumiaki Kobayashi; Japan	5.20
Long jump	Masaki Morinaga; Japan	8.10	Liu Hongning; China	8.05	Abdulrahman Al-Nubi; Qatar	7.99
Triple jump	Sergey Arzamasov; Kazakhstan	17.00	Duan Qifeng; China	16.98	Nattaporn Namkanha; Thailand	16.42
Shot put	Liu Hao; China	19.20	Shakti Singh; India	18.81	Sergey Rubtsov; Kazakhstan	18.79
Discus throw	Li Shaojie; China	64.58; GR	Anil Kumar; India	58.43	Zhang Cunbiao; China	57.28
Hammer throw	Koji Murofushi; Japan	78.57; GR	Andrey Abduvaliyev; Uzbekistan	77.14	Nikolay Davydov; Kyrgyzstan	68.10
Javelin throw	Sergey Voynov; Uzbekistan	79.70	Zhang Lianbiao; China	78.58	Li Rongxiang; China	78.57
Decathlon	Oleg Veretelnikov; Uzbekistan	8278; GR	Ramil Ganiyev; Uzbekistan	7857	Toru Yasui; Japan	7612

=== Women ===
Event	Gold		Silver		Bronze	
100 m	Li Xuemei; China	11.05	Li Yali; China	11.36	Rachita Mistry; India	11.41
200 m	Damayanthi Dharsha; Sri Lanka	22.48; GR	Li Xuemei; China	22.53	Yan Jiankui; China	23.15
400 m	Damayanthi Dharsha; Sri Lanka	51.57	Chen Yuxiang; China	52.50	Svetlana Bodritskaya; Kazakhstan	53.00
800 m	Jyotirmoyee Sikdar; India	2:01.00	Rosa Kutty; India	2:03.34	Wang Yuanping; China	2:04.45
1500 m	Jyotirmoyee Sikdar; India	4:12.82	Wang Qingfen; China	4:13.19	Sunita Rani; India	4:13.66
5000 m	Supriyati Sutono; Indonesia	15:54.45; GR	Sunita Rani; India	15:54.47	Michiko Shimizu; Japan	15:55.36
10,000 m	Yuko Kawakami; Japan	32:01.25	Zheng Guixia; China	32:18.81	Chiemi Takahashi; Japan	32:20.68
100 m hurdles	Olga Shishigina; Kazakhstan	12.63; GR	Liu Jing; China	12.89	Sriyani Kulawansa; Sri Lanka	13.08
400 m hurdles	Natalya Torshina; Kazakhstan	55.33	Hsu Pei-ching; Chinese Taipei	55.71	Li Yulian; China	55.93
4 × 100 m relay	China; Liang Yi; Yan Jiankui; Li Xuemei; Li Yali	43.36; GR	Uzbekistan; Guzel Khubbieva; Lyubov Perepelova; Lyudmila Dmitriadi; Elena Kviatkovskaya	44.38	Thailand; Supavadee Khawpeag; Natthaporn Wongtiprat; Savitree Srichure; Reawadee Watanasin	44.68
4 × 400 m relay	China; Zhang Hengyun; Zhang Henghua; Li Yulian; Chen Yuxiang	3:32.03	India; K. M. Beenamol; Jyotirmoyee Sikdar; Rosa Kutty; Jincy Phillip	3:32.20	Kazakhstan; Natalya Torshina; Svetlana Badrankova; Svetlana Bodritskaya; Svetlana Kazanina	3:37.16
Marathon	Naoko Takahashi; Japan	2:21:47; AR	Kim Chang-ok; North Korea	2:34:55	Tomoko Kai; Japan	2:35:01
10,000 m walk	Liu Hongyu; China	43:57.28; GR	Rie Mitsumori; Japan	44:29.82	Svetlana Tolstaya; Kazakhstan	45:29.95
High jump	Yoko Ota; Japan	1.88	Jin Ling; China	1.88	Anna Cherntsova; Kyrgyzstan	1.84
Pole vault	Cai Weiyan; China	4.00; GR	Masumi Ono; Japan	4.00 =GR	Sun Caiyun; China	4.00 =GR
Long jump	Guan Yingnan; China	6.89	Yu Yiqun; China	6.77	Yelena Pershina; Kazakhstan	6.55
Triple jump	Ren Ruiping; China	14.27; GR	Wu Lingmei; China	14.25	Wiktoriýa Brigadnaýa; Turkmenistan	13.66
Shot put	Li Meisu; China	18.96	Cheng Xiaoyan; China	18.55	Juttaporn Krasaeyan; Thailand	18.24
Discus throw	Luan Zhili; China	63.43	Liu Fengying; China	59.34	Neelam Jaswant Singh; India	55.09
Javelin throw	Lee Young-sun; South Korea	62.09	Liang Lili; China	60.11	Gurmeet Kaur; India	59.00
Heptathlon	Shen Shengfei; China	5817	Svetlana Kazanina; Kazakhstan	5775	Ma Chun-ping; Chinese Taipei	5659

== Medal table ==
Rank	Nation	Gold	Silver	Bronze	Total
1	China (CHN)	15	17	7	39
2	Japan (JPN)	12	4	8	24
3	Kazakhstan (KAZ)	4	4	5	13
4	South Korea (KOR)	4	3	2	9
5	Sri Lanka (SRI)	3	0	2	5
6	India (IND)	2	6	7	15
7	Qatar (QAT)	2	3	3	8
8	Uzbekistan (UZB)	2	3	0	5
9	Indonesia (INA)	1	0	0	1
10	Thailand (THA)	0	2	3	5
11	Chinese Taipei (TPE)	0	1	2	3
12	Iran (IRI)	0	1	1	2
12	North Korea (PRK)	0	1	1	2
14	Kyrgyzstan (KGZ)	0	0	2	2
15	Malaysia (MAS)	0	0	1	1
15	Oman (OMA)	0	0	1	1
15	Turkmenistan (TKM)	0	0	1	1
Totals (17 entries)		45	45	46	136

== Participating nations ==
A total of 451 athletes from 37 nations competed in athletics at the 1998 Asian Games:

- Bahrain (1)
- Bangladesh (4)
- Cambodia (2)
- China (59)
- Chinese Taipei (17)
- Hong Kong (7)
- India (26)
- Indonesia (5)
- Iran (8)
- Japan (63)
- Jordan (6)
- Kazakhstan (19)
- Kuwait (7)
- Kyrgyzstan (7)
- Laos (5)
- Lebanon (4)
- Macau (2)
- Malaysia (11)
- Maldives (2)
- Mongolia (3)
- Nepal (9)
- North Korea (6)
- Oman (8)
- Pakistan (2)
- Palestine (3)
- Philippines (1)
- Qatar (25)
- South Korea (19)
- Sri Lanka (22)
- Syria (5)
- Tajikistan (5)
- Thailand (60)
- Turkmenistan (3)
- United Arab Emirates (2)
- Uzbekistan (13)
- Vietnam (8)
- Yemen (2)
