= Athletics at the 2002 Asian Games – Men's 400 metres =

Athletics

Men's 400 metres at the 2002 Asian Games
- Venue: Busan Asiad Main Stadium
- Dates: 7–9 October 2002
- Competitors: 21 from 13 nations

Medalists
gold medal	Fawzi Al-Shammari	Kuwait
silver medal	Hamdan Al-Bishi	Saudi Arabia
bronze medal	Rohan Pradeep Kumara	Sri Lanka

The men's 400 metres competition at the 2002 Asian Games in Busan, South Korea was held on 7–9 October at the Busan Asiad Main Stadium.

== Schedule ==
All times are Korea Standard Time (UTC+09:00)

Date	Time	Event
Monday, 7 October 2002	11:20	1st round
Tuesday, 8 October 2002	11:00	Semifinals
Wednesday, 9 October 2002	14:30	Final

== Records ==
Prior to this competition, the existing world, Asian and Games records were as follows.

World Record	Michael Johnson (USA)	43.18	Seville, Spain	26 August 1999
Asian Record	Mohammed Al-Malki (OMA)	44.56	Budapest, Hungary	12 August 1988
Games Record	Ibrahim Ismail Muftah (QAT)	44.93	Hiroshima, Japan	11 October 1994

== Results ==
Legend

- DNF — Did not finish

=== 1st round ===
- Qualification: First 4 in each heat (Q) and the next 4 fastest (q) advance to the semifinals.

==== Heat 1 ====
Rank	Athlete	Time	Notes
1	Hamdan Al-Bishi (KSA)	45.26	Q
2	Fawzi Al-Shammari (KUW)	46.17	Q
3	Masayuki Okusako (JPN)	47.12	Q
4	Salaheddine Al-Safi (QAT)	47.77	Q
5	Hwang Il-sok (PRK)	48.50	q
6	Weera Kongsri (THA)	49.75	
—	Kim Do-sun (KOR)	DNF	

==== Heat 2 ====
Rank	Athlete	Time	Notes
1	Rohan Pradeep Kumara (SRI)	46.50	Q
2	Purukottam Ramachandran (IND)	46.79	Q
3	Kenji Tabata (JPN)	46.82	Q
4	Mohammed Al-Salhi (KSA)	47.04	Q
5	Ni Zhenjie (CHN)	47.38	q
6	Khaled Al-Johar (KUW)	47.77	q
7	Pich Kong (CAM)	52.78	

==== Heat 3 ====
Rank	Athlete	Time	Notes
1	Sugath Thilakaratne (SRI)	46.73	Q
2	Liang Chao (CHN)	46.74	Q
3	Ernie Candelario (PHI)	46.96	Q
4	Paramjit Singh (IND)	47.58	Q
5	Senee Kongtong (THA)	48.74	q
6	Lee Sang-bong (KOR)	49.35	
7	Chao Un Kei (MAC)	50.50	

=== Semifinals ===
- Qualification: First 4 in each heat (Q) advance to the final.

==== Heat 1 ====
Rank	Athlete	Time	Notes
1	Hamdan Al-Bishi (KSA)	45.56	Q
2	Fawzi Al-Shammari (KUW)	46.45	Q
3	Masayuki Okusako (JPN)	46.81	Q
4	Ernie Candelario (PHI)	46.84	Q
5	Sugath Thilakaratne (SRI)	47.28	
6	Salaheddine Al-Safi (QAT)	47.88	
7	Ni Zhenjie (CHN)	48.24	
8	Senee Kongtong (THA)	49.85	

==== Heat 2 ====
Rank	Athlete	Time	Notes
1	Rohan Pradeep Kumara (SRI)	46.60	Q
2	Liang Chao (CHN)	46.67	Q
3	Kenji Tabata (JPN)	47.19	Q
4	Purukottam Ramachandran (IND)	47.42	Q
5	Paramjit Singh (IND)	47.50	
6	Mohammed Al-Salhi (KSA)	47.60	
7	Khaled Al-Johar (KUW)	47.90	
8	Hwang Il-sok (PRK)	49.06	

=== Final ===
Rank	Athlete	Time	Notes
1st place, gold medalist(s)	Fawzi Al-Shammari (KUW)	44.93	=GR
2nd place, silver medalist(s)	Hamdan Al-Bishi (KSA)	44.95	
3rd place, bronze medalist(s)	Rohan Pradeep Kumara (SRI)	45.67	
4	Masayuki Okusako (JPN)	46.11	
5	Purukottam Ramachandran (IND)	46.15	
6	Liang Chao (CHN)	46.25	
7	Kenji Tabata (JPN)	46.61	
8	Ernie Candelario (PHI)	46.95	
