= Athletics at the 2001 SEA Games =

International athletics championship event

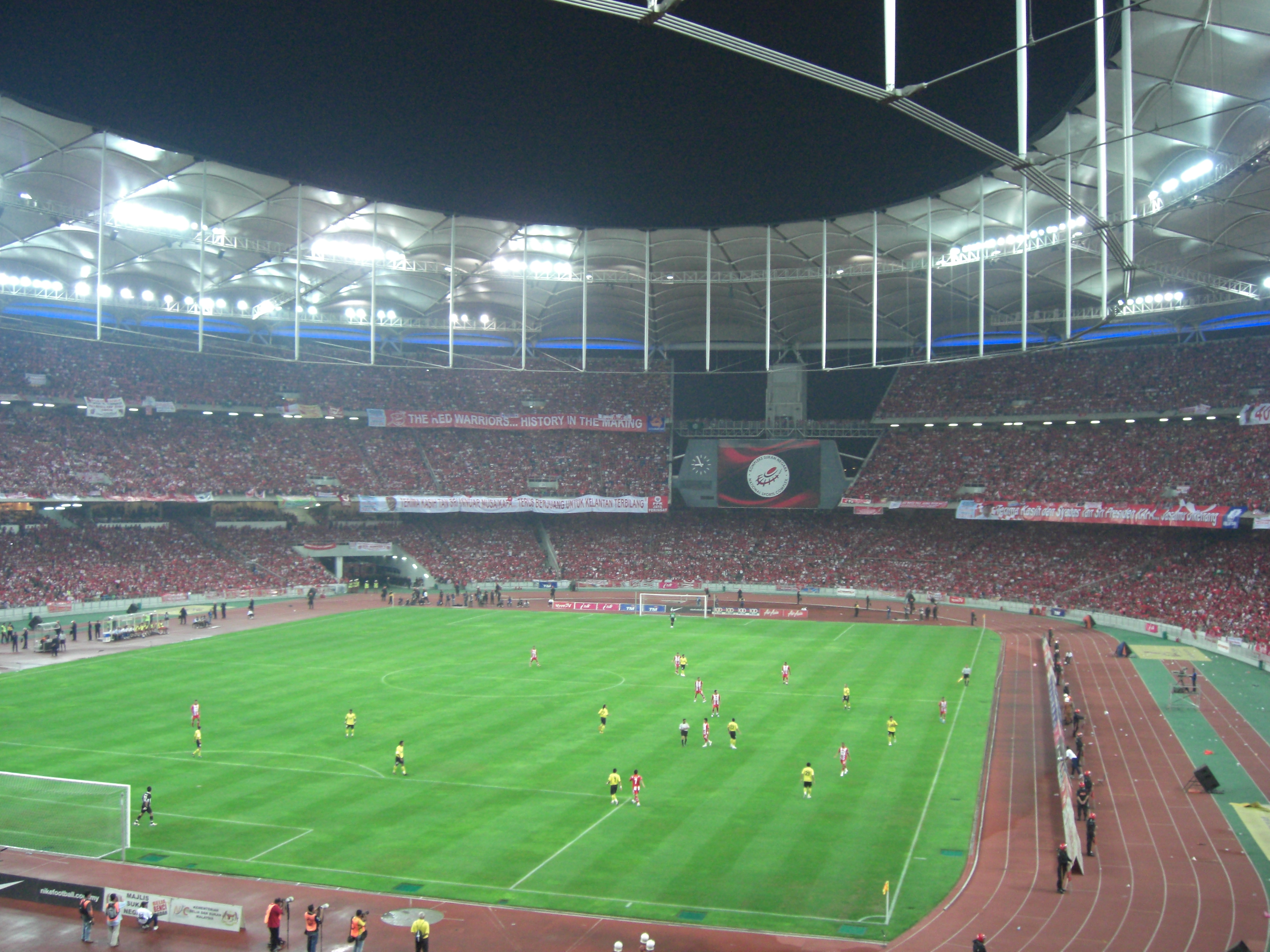
- The National Stadium hosted the track and field events.
- Venue: National Stadium
- Location: Kuala Lumpur, Malaysia
- Date: 12–15 September 2001
- Nations: 10

At the 2001 SEA Games, the athletics events were held in Kuala Lumpur, Malaysia. A total of 46 events were contested, of which 24 by male and 22 by female athletes. The track and field events were hosted at the National Stadium, Bukit Jalil, the marathons were held around Merdeka Square, and the racewalking events took place at Titiwangsa Lake Gardens.

Seven of the ten competing nations reached the medal table. Thailand, traditionally the regional leader in athletics, was the most successful nation, winning twenty-two gold medals and forty-one in total. The Philippines and Malaysia each won eight gold medals, with the Philippines edging into second with a medal haul of 23 (one more than the hosts). Indonesia and Vietnam respectively won 22 and 17 medals overall.

Three new women's events were introduced at the 21st edition of the competition: pole vault, hammer throw, and the 20 km race walk. Apart from the new events, eight previous games records were beaten at the competition, as well as 29 national records. Many champions from the 1999 edition of the tournament retained their titles: Arumugam Munusamy (men's 1500 metres) and Supriati Sutono (women's 5000 metres) won their third straight SEA Games titles, Juthaporn Krasaeyan had her third consecutive women's shot put and discus throw double, Loo Kum Zee won his fourth men's high jump gold, James Wong Tuck Yim took a fifth title in the men's discus and Nur Herman Majid extended his unbeaten run in the 110 metres hurdles to six titles.

Thailand had a sweep of the relays and several Thai athletes won multiple gold medals. Reanchai Sriharwong and Supavadee Khawpeag did the 100/200 metres sprint double on the men's and women's sides respectively, with Khawpeag breaking the Thai records in the process. Wassana Winatho won the women's 400 metres flat and hurdles, while Nattaporn Nomkanha was the men's gold medallist in the long jump and triple jump. Outside of Thailand, three other athletes topped the individual podium twice. The Philippines' Eduardo Buenavista won the 5000 m and 3000 metres steeplechase (knocking fifteen seconds off the games record in the latter). Pham Dinh Khanh Doan did a women's middle-distance double for Vietnam, while Indonesia's Supriyati Sutono improved the standards for the 5000 m and 10,000 metres, setting meet records in both.

== Medal summary ==
=== Men ===
Event	Gold		Silver		Bronze	
100 metres (Wind: -0.5 m/s)	Reanchai Sriharwong; Thailand	10.29	U. K. Shyam; Singapore	10.37 =NR	Kongdech Natenee; Thailand	10.45
200 metres	Reanchai Sriharwong; Thailand	20.95	Azmi Ibrahim; Malaysia	20.97	Raman Ganeshwaran; Malaysia	21.35
400 metres	Ernie Candelario; Philippines	46.59	Narong Nilploy; Thailand	46.72	Romzi Bakar; Malaysia	46.94
800 metres	John Lozada; Philippines	1:49.39	Dicky Gunawan; Indonesia	1:50.67	Suthirak Pinthong; Thailand	1:51.81
1500 metres	Arumugam Munusamy; Malaysia	3:50.53	John Lozada; Philippines	3:51.44	Nguyễn Văn Minh; Vietnam	3:51.76 NR
5000 metres	Eduardo Buenavista; Philippines	14:15.13	I Gede Karang Asem; Indonesia	14:43.31	Boonchu Chandecha; Thailand	14:43.96
10,000 metres	Aung Thuya; Myanmar	30:51.41	I Gede Karang Asem; Indonesia	30:57.23	Gopal Thein Win; Myanmar	30:58.01
110 metres hurdles	Nur Herman Majid; Malaysia	14.02 GR	Narongdech Janjai; Thailand	14.22	Mohd Faiz Mohamed; Malaysia	14.28
400 metres hurdles	Jirachai Linglom; Thailand	50.63	Nguyễn Bảo Huy; Vietnam	51.56 NR	Virut Sarat; Thailand	52.04
3000 metres steeplechase	Eduardo Buenavista; Philippines	8:40.77 GR	Daud Mama; Philippines	9:02.89	Jirasak Sutthichart; Thailand	9:09.51
4 × 100 metres relay	Thailand (THA); Kongdech Natenee; Vissanu Sophanich; Ekkachai Janthana; Reanchai Sriharwong	39.66	Malaysia (MAS); Mohd Faiz Mohamed; Raman Ganeshwaran; Azmi Ibrahim; Watson Nyambek	39.83 NR	Indonesia (INA)	40.49
4 × 400 metres relay	Thailand (THA); Jirachai Linglom; Senee Kongtong; Chalermpol Noohlong; Narong Nilploy	3:07.81	Philippines (PHI)	3:09.01	Malaysia (MAS); Moorthy; Muhamad Zaiful Zainal Abidin; Adam; Romzi Bakar	3:09.83
Marathon	Roy Vence; Philippines	2:23:51	Allan Ballester; Philippines	2:24:38	Osias Kamlase; Indonesia	2:33:03
20 km walk	Teoh Boon Lim; Malaysia	1:32:46	Kristian Lumban Tobing; Indonesia	1:33:46	Balaysendaran Thirukumaran; Malaysia	1:34:30
50 km walk	Govindasamy Saravanan; Malaysia	4:34:04	Sutrisno; Indonesia	4:35:26	Sakchai Samuthkao; Thailand	4:51:33
High jump	Loo Kum Zee; Malaysia	2.18 m	Sean Guevara; Philippines	2.13 m	Nguyễn Duy Bằng; Vietnam	2.11 m NR
Pole vault	Teh Weng Chang; Malaysia	4.90 m =NR	Somchet Karnkha; Thailand	4.80 m	Nunung Jayadi; Indonesia	4.80 m
Long jump	Nattaporn Nomkanha; Thailand	7.73 m	Joebert Delicano; Philippines	7.55 m	Moh. Sharul Amri Suhaimi; Malaysia	7.36 m
Triple jump	Nattaporn Nomkanha; Thailand	16.37 m GR	Sugeng Jatmiko; Indonesia	15.35 m	Joebert Delicano; Philippines	15.10 m
Shot put	Chatchawal Polyemg; Thailand	17.26 m GR	Dong Enxin; Singapore	17.08 m	Wansawang Sawatdee; Thailand	16.51 m
Discus throw	James Wong Tuck Yim; Singapore	56.98 m	Wansawang Sawatdee; Thailand	51.19 m NR	Dong Enxin; Singapore	48.06 m
Hammer throw	Wong Tee Kue; Malaysia	57.07 m	Ong Kok Hin; Indonesia	52.90 m	Arniel Ferrera; Philippines	51.07 m
Javelin throw	Therdsak Boonchansri; Thailand	72.89 m NR	Dandy Gallenero; Philippines	67.14 m	Kyaw Swar Mue; Myanmar	64.48 m
Decathlon	Fidel Gallenero; Philippines	6958 pts	Boonyaket Chalon; Thailand	6332 pts	Roberto Fresnido; Philippines	4947 pts

=== Women ===
Event	Gold		Silver		Bronze	
100 metres (Wind: +0.8 m/s)	Supavadee Khawpeag; Thailand	11.33 NR	Oranut Klomdee; Thailand	11.69	Lerma Bulauitan; Philippines	11.74
200 metres	Supavadee Khawpeag; Thailand	23.30 NR, GR	Irene Truitje Joseph; Indonesia	24.21	Võ Thị Ngọc Hạnh; Vietnam	24.70
400 metres	Wassana Winatho; Thailand	53.46	Saipin Kaewsorn; Thailand	54.91	Dương Thị Hồng Hạnh; Vietnam	55.54
800 metres	Phạm Đình Khánh Đoan; Vietnam	2:10.02	Ester Sumah; Indonesia	2:11.82	Armonrat Buatharach; Thailand	2:12.39
1500 metres	Phạm Đình Khánh Đoan; Vietnam	4:21.87 NR	Supriyati Sutono; Indonesia	4:25.44	Phyu War Thet; Myanmar	4:26.64
5000 metres	Supriyati Sutono; Indonesia	16:08.93 GR	Pa Pa; Myanmar	16:09.10 NR	Đoàn Nữ Trúc Vân; Vietnam	16:40.71 NR
10,000 metres	Supriyati Sutono; Indonesia	33:50.06 GR	Pa Pa; Myanmar	34:04.07	Đoàn Nữ Trúc Vân; Vietnam	35:21.16 NR
100 metres hurdles (Wind: +0.0 m/s)	Trecia Roberts; Thailand	13.21	Moh Siew Wei; Malaysia	13.43 NR	Vũ Bích Hường; Vietnam	13.47
400 metres hurdles	Wassana Winatho; Thailand	57.09	Noraseela Mohd Khalid; Malaysia	58.93	Cherry; Myanmar	59.38 NR
4 × 100 metres relay	Thailand (THA); Jutamass Tawoncharoen; Supavadee Khawpeag; Oranut Klomdee; Trecia Roberts	44.58	Vietnam (VIE)	45.30 NR	Malaysia (MAS); Job; Moh Siew Wei; Abdul Rahman; Alfred	45.90
4 × 400 metres relay	Thailand (THA); Oranut Klomdee; Wassana Winatho; Saipin Kaewsorn; Supavadee Khawpeag	3:38.70	Vietnam (VIE)	3:42.40	Malaysia (MAS)	3:45.48
Marathon	Cristabel Martes; Philippines	2:52:43	Pa Pa; Myanmar	2:55:51	Erni Ulatningsih; Indonesia	2:57:10
20 km walk	Yuan Yufang; Malaysia	1:42:55 GR	Tersiana Riwu Rohi; Indonesia	1:45:40 NR	Darwati; Indonesia	1:47:03
High jump	Netnapa Thaiking; Thailand	1.80 m	Narcisa Atienza; Philippines	1.74 m NR	Noengrothai Chaipetch; Thailand	1.74 m
Pole vault	Ni Putu Desi Margawati; Indonesia	3.90 m GR	Roslinda Samsu; Malaysia	3.80 m	Nampetch Pinthong; Thailand	3.70 m NR
Long jump	Phạm Thị Thu Lan; Vietnam	6.46 m	Lerma Bulauitan; Philippines	6.43 m	Nguyễn Thị Bích Vân; Vietnam	6.37 m
Triple jump	Wacharee Ritthiwat; Thailand	13.46 m	Phạm Thị Thu Lan; Vietnam	13.09 m	Nguyễn Thị Bích Vân; Vietnam	13.03 m
Shot put	Juthaporn Krasaeyan; Thailand	17.24 m	Kruawan Taweedech; Thailand	13.90 m	Aye Mon Khin; Myanmar	13.17 m
Discus throw	Juthaporn Krasaeyan; Thailand	48.08 m	Darminah; Indonesia	46.00 m	Dwi Ratnawati; Indonesia	45.68 m
Hammer throw	Benchamas Ounkaew; Thailand	49.84 m NR, GR	Yurita Arianny Arsyad; Indonesia	49.39 m	Siti Shahidah Abdullah; Malaysia	47.75 m NR
Javelin throw	Buoban Pamang; Thailand	54.80 m NR, GR	Geralyn Amandoron; Philippines	49.85 m	Chanthana Hongsa; Thailand	48.15 m
Heptathlon	Elma Muros; Philippines	5059 pts	Percela Molina; Philippines	4687 pts	Vũ Bích Hường; Vietnam	4427 pts

== Results ==
=== Men ===
==== 100 metres ====
Round 1

- Heat 1

Wind: -0.6 m/s

Rank	Athlete	Time	Notes
1	Kongdech Natenee (THA)	10.57	
2	Luong Tich Thien (VIE)	10.65	
3	Sukari (INA)	10.67	
4	Watson Nyambek (MAS)	10.71	
5	Aaron Huang Bing Kai (SIN)	10.87	
6	Somphavanh Soukaloune (LAO)	11.31	

- Heat 2

Wind: -0.4 m/s

Rank	Athlete	Time	Notes
1	Reanchai Sriharwong (THA)	10.34	
2	Jerme Amandoron (SIN)	10.51	
3	Hamberi Mahat (MAS)	10.77	
4	Erwin Heru Susanto (INA)	10.79	
5	Tran Van Xuan (VIE)	10.80	
6	Mohd Arman Hj Sanip (MAS)	10.81	
7	Boungnasit Chantachack (LAO)	11.60	

Final

Wind: -0.5 m/s

Rank	Athlete	Time	Notes
1st place, gold medalist(s)	Reanchai Sriharwong (THA)	10.29	
2nd place, silver medalist(s)	Umaglia K.Shyam (SIN)	10.37	=NR
3rd place, bronze medalist(s)	Kongdech Natenee (THA)	10.45	
4	Luong Tich Thien (VIE)	10.69	
5	Watson Nyambek (MAS)	10.70	
6	Erwin Heru Susanto (INA)	10.80	
7	Sukari (INA)	10.82	
—	Hamberi Mahat (MAS)	DNS	

==== 200 metres ====
Round 1

- Heat 1

Wind: -0.7 m/s

Rank	Athlete	Time	Notes
1	Azmi Ibrahim (MAS)	20.97	
2	Reanchai Sriharwong (THA)	21.13	
3	S. Subakir (INA)	21.59	
4	Trinh Duc Thanh (VIE)	21.80	
5	Mohd Arman Hj Sanip (BRU)	22.18	
6	Lo Vongsa (LAO)	22.90	

- Heat 2

Wind: +0.8 m/s

Rank	Athlete	Time	Notes
1	Raman Ganeshwaran (MAS)	21.38	
2	Ekkachai Janthana (THA)	21.49	
3	Nguyen Thanh Hai (VIE)	21.71	
4	Mohd Shameer Ayub (SIN)	21.76	
5	Qurais (INA)	21.95	

Final

Wind: -0.5 m/s

Rank	Athlete	Time	Notes
1st place, gold medalist(s)	Reanchai Sriharwong (THA)	20.95	
2nd place, silver medalist(s)	Azmi Ibrahim (MAS)	20.97	
3rd place, bronze medalist(s)	Raman Ganeshwaran (MAS)	21.35	
4	Nguyen Thanh Hai (VIE)	21.70	NR
5	Ekkachai Janthana (THA)	21.70	
6	S. Subakir (INA)	21.90	
7	Trinh Duc Thanh (VIE)	22.05	
—	Mohd Shameer Ayub (SIN)	DSQ	

==== 400 metres ====
Final

Rank	Athlete	Time	Notes
1st place, gold medalist(s)	Ernie Candelario (PHI)	46.59	
2nd place, silver medalist(s)	Narong Nilploy (THA)	46.72	
3rd place, bronze medalist(s)	Romzi Bakar (MAS)	46.94	
4	Onesimus Windesi (INA)	47.12	
5	Mohd Zaiful Zainal Abidin (MAS)	47.67	
6	Ahmad Sakeh (INA)	47.98	
7	Nguyen Dang Truong (VIE)	48.75	NR

==== 800 metres ====
Round 1

- Heat 1

Rank	Athlete	Time	Notes
1	Akrin (INA)	1:57.10	
2	Arumugam Munusamy (MAS)	1:57.47	
3	Chidanbaram Veeramani (SIN)	1:57.33	
4	Aniruth Saisood (THA)	1:58.05	
5	Pich Kong (CAM)	2:01.96	

- Heat 2

Wind: +0.8 m/s

Rank	Athlete	Time	Notes
1	John Lozada (PHI)	1:54.80	
2	Dicky Gunawan (INA)	1:54.87	
3	Tran Van Sy (VIE)	1:54.95	
4	Suthirak Pinthong (SIN)	1:54.98	
5	Lee Phongsanith (LAO)	2:01.66	

Final

Rank	Athlete	Time	Notes
1st place, gold medalist(s)	John Lozada (PHI)	1:49.39	
2nd place, silver medalist(s)	Dicky Gunawan (INA)	1:50.67	
3rd place, bronze medalist(s)	Suthirak Pinthong (THA)	1:51.81	
4	Tran Van Sy (VIE)	1:51.93	
5	Chidanbaram Veeramani (SIN)	1:52.99	
6	Akrin (INA)	1:53.49	
—	Aniruth Saisood (THA)	DNF	
—	Arumugam Munusamy (MAS)	DNS	

==== 1500 metres ====
Final

Rank	Athlete	Time	Notes
1st place, gold medalist(s)	Arumugam Munusamy (MAS)	3:50.53	
2nd place, silver medalist(s)	John Lozada (PHI)	3:51.44	
3rd place, bronze medalist(s)	Nguyen Van Minh (VIE)	3:51.76	NR
4	S.Pd. Emilmon (INA)	3:52.59	
5	Chamkaur Dhaliwal Singh (SIN)	3:54.02	
6	Subramaniam Ganesan (MAS)	3:55.47	
7	Jimy Anak Ahar (BRU)	4:05.65	
8	Tipparos Waeha (THA)	4:07.32	
9	Lee Phongsanith (LAO)	4:14.90	
10	Chatonlonh (LAO)	4:20.17	

==== 5000 metres ====
Final

Rank	Athlete	Time	Notes
1st place, gold medalist(s)	Eduardo Buenavista (PHI)	14:15.13	
2nd place, silver medalist(s)	I Gede Karang Asem (INA)	14:43.31	
3rd place, bronze medalist(s)	Boonchu Chandecha (THA)	14:43.96	
4	Gopal Thein Win (MYA)	14:45.06	
5	Aung Thuya (MYA)	14:49.58	
6	Daud Mama (PHI)	14:57.90	
7	Jirasak Sutthichart (THA)	15:16.23	
8	Chamkaur Dhaliwal Singh (SIN)	15:24.42	
9	Pov Huk (CAM)	17:05.60	

==== 10,000 metres ====
Final

Rank	Athlete	Time	Notes
1st place, gold medalist(s)	Aung Thuya (MYA)	30:51.41	
2nd place, silver medalist(s)	I Gede Karang Asem (INA)	30:57.23	
3rd place, bronze medalist(s)	Gopal Thein Win (MYA)	30:58.01	
4	Boonchu Chandecha (THA)	31:00.96	
5	Sutat Kallayanakitti (THA)	32:08.13	
6	Antonius Fallo (INA)	33:17.12	
7	Pov Huk (CAM)	39:11.22	

==== 110 metres hurdles ====
Final

Wind: 0.0 m/s

Rank	Athlete	Time	Notes
1st place, gold medalist(s)	Nur Herman Majid (MAS)	14.02	
2nd place, silver medalist(s)	Narongdech Janjai (THA)	14.22	
3rd place, bronze medalist(s)	Mohd Faiz Mohamed (MAS)	14.28	
4	Moh. Rusli (INA)	14.59	
5	Tran Quoc Hoan (VIE)	14.94	
6	Suphan Wongsripart (THA)	15.14	
7	Nguyen Thanh Tung (VIE)	15.72	

==== 400 metres hurdles ====
Final

Rank	Athlete	Time	Notes
1st place, gold medalist(s)	Jirachai Linglom (THA)	50.63	
2nd place, silver medalist(s)	Nguyen Bao Huy (VIE)	51.56	NR
3rd place, bronze medalist(s)	Virut Sarat (THA)	52.04	
4	Zulkarnaen Purba (INA)	52.76	
5	Nguyen Van Tang (VIE)	53.09	
6	Anuar Che Seman (MAS)	53.71	
7	Domingo Manata (VIE)	53.72	

==== 3000 metres steeplechase ====
Final

Rank	Athlete	Time	Notes
1st place, gold medalist(s)	Eduardo Buenavista (PHI)	8:40.77	
2nd place, silver medalist(s)	Daud Mama (PHI)	9:02.89	
3rd place, bronze medalist(s)	Jirasak Sutthichart (THA)	9:09.51	
4	Subramaniam Ganesan (MAS)	9:18.38	
—	Ganesan Elangovan (SIN)	DNF	

==== 4 × 100 metres relay ====
Final

Rank	Nation	Competitors	Time	Notes
1st place, gold medalist(s)	Thailand (THA)	Kongdech Natenee, Vissanu Sophanich, Ekkachai Janthana, Reanchai Sriharwong	39.66	
2nd place, silver medalist(s)	Malaysia (MAS)	Mohd Faiz Mohamed, Raman Ganeshwaran, Azmi Ibrahim, Watson Nyambek	39.83	NR
3rd place, bronze medalist(s)	Indonesia (INA)	?, ?, ?, ?	40.49	
4	Singapore (SIN)	?, ?, ?, ?	40.64	
5	Vietnam (VIE)	?, ?, ?, ?	41.02	
6	Laos (LAO)	?, ?, ?, ?	43.00	=NR

==== 4 × 400 metres relay ====
Final

Rank	Nation	Competitors	Time	Notes
1st place, gold medalist(s)	Thailand (THA)	Jirachai Linglom, Senee Kongtong, Chalermpol Noohlong, Narong Nilploy	3:07.81	
2nd place, silver medalist(s)	Philippines (PHI)	?, ?, ?, ?	3:09.01	
3rd place, bronze medalist(s)	Malaysia (MAS)	Moorthy, Muhamad Zaiful Zainal Abidin, Adam, Romzi Bakar	3:09.83	
4	Indonesia (INA)	?, ?, ?, ?	3:12.14	
5	Vietnam (VIE)	?, ?, ?, ?	3:16.70	
6	Singapore (SIN)	?, ?, ?, ?	3:17.11	

==== Marathon ====
Final

Rank	Athlete	Time	Notes
1st place, gold medalist(s)	Roy Vence (PHI)	2:23:51	
2nd place, silver medalist(s)	Allan Ballester (PHI)	2:24:38	
3rd place, bronze medalist(s)	Osias Kamlase (INA)	2:33:03	
4	Rosli Bin Rumia (MAS)	2:40:28	
—	Antonius Fallo (INA)	DNF	
—	Zaw Min Htwe (MYA)	DNF	
—	Sifli Anak Ahar (BRU)	DNF	

==== 20 km walk ====
Final

Rank	Athlete	Time	Notes
1st place, gold medalist(s)	Teoh Boon Lim (MAS)	1:32:46	
2nd place, silver medalist(s)	Kristian L.Tobing (INA)	1:33:46	
3rd place, bronze medalist(s)	Balaysendaran Thirukumaran (MAS)	1:34:30	
4	Myint Htay (MYA)	1:36:33	
5	Werapun Anunchai (THA)	1:44:47	

==== 50 km walk ====
Final

Rank	Athlete	Time	Notes
1st place, gold medalist(s)	Govindasamy Saravanan (MAS)	4:34:04	
2nd place, silver medalist(s)	Sutrisno (INA)	4:35:26	
3rd place, bronze medalist(s)	Sakchai Samuthkao (THA)	4:51:33	
—	Narinder Harbans Singh (MAS)	DNF	

==== High jump ====
Final

Rank	Athlete	Result	Notes
1st place, gold medalist(s)	Loo Kum Zee (MAS)	2.18 m	
2nd place, silver medalist(s)	Sean Guevara (PHI)	2.13 m	
3rd place, bronze medalist(s)	Nguyen Duy Bang (VIE)	2.11 m	NR
4	Arya Yuniawan (INA)	2.01 m	
5	Jarad Maliwong (THA)	2.01 m	

==== Pole vault ====
Final

Rank	Athlete	Result	Notes
1st place, gold medalist(s)	Teh Weng Chang (MAS)	4.90 m	=NR
2nd place, silver medalist(s)	Somchet Karnkha (THA)	4.80 m	
3rd place, bronze medalist(s)	Nunung Jayadi (INA)	4.80 m	
4	Emerson Obiena (PHI)	4.70 m	
5	Yeap Lai Hin (MAS)	4.70 m	

==== Long jump ====
Final

Rank	Athlete	Result	Notes
1st place, gold medalist(s)	Nattaporn Nomkanha (THA)	7.73 m	
2nd place, silver medalist(s)	Joebert Delicano (PHI)	7.55 m	
3rd place, bronze medalist(s)	Moh.Sharul Amri Suhaimi (MAS)	7.36 m	
4	Mohd Malik Ahmad Tobias (MAS)	7.22 m	
5	Windarji (INA)	7.11 m	
6	Raphie Pilaspilas (PHI)	7.02 m	
7	Nguyen Ngoc Quan (VIE)	7.01 m	
8	Myo Min Zin (MYA)	6.70 m	
9	Chaleuansouk Adoudomphon (LAO)	6.36 m	
—	Satid Kongpayak (THA)	NM	

==== Triple jump ====
Final

Rank	Athlete	Result	Notes
1st place, gold medalist(s)	Nattaporn Nomkanha (THA)	16.37 m	
2nd place, silver medalist(s)	Sugeng Jatmiko (INA)	15.35 m	
3rd place, bronze medalist(s)	Joebert Delicano (PHI)	15.10 m	
4	Chai Song Lip (MAS)	14.88 m	
5	Mohd Zaki Sadri (MAS)	14.86 m	
6	Myo Min Zin (MYA)	14.70 m	
7	Henry Dagmil (PHI)	14.45 m	
8	Thaveesri Boongruang (THA)	14.43 m	
9	Nguyen Mai Linh (VIE)	13.35 m	

==== Shot put ====
Final

Rank	Athlete	Result	Notes
1st place, gold medalist(s)	Chatchawal Polyemg (THA)	17.26 m	
2nd place, silver medalist(s)	Dong Enxin (SIN)	17.08 m	
3rd place, bronze medalist(s)	Wansawang Sawatdee (THA)	16.51 m	
4	Dao Dan Tieng (VIE)	14.44 m	

==== Discus throw ====
Final

Rank	Athlete	Result	Notes
1st place, gold medalist(s)	James Wong Tuck Yim (SIN)	56.98 m	
2nd place, silver medalist(s)	Wansawang Sawatdee (THA)	51.19 m	NR
3rd place, bronze medalist(s)	Dong Enxin (SIN)	48.06 m	
4	Dao Dan Tieng (VIE)	47.17 m	
5	Chatchawal Polyemg (THA)	45.91 m	

==== Hammer throw ====
Final

Rank	Athlete	Result	Notes
1st place, gold medalist(s)	Wong Tee Kue (MAS)	57.07 m	
2nd place, silver medalist(s)	Ong Kok Hin (INA)	52.90 m	
3rd place, bronze medalist(s)	Arniel Ferrera (PHI)	51.07 m	
4	Jerro Perater (PHI)	50.03 m	
5	Dong Enxin (SIN)	48.99 m	
6	Wichit Homthownlom (THA)	42.85 m	

==== Javelin throw ====
Final

Rank	Athlete	Result	Notes
1st place, gold medalist(s)	Therdsak Boonchansri (THA)	72.89 m	NR
2nd place, silver medalist(s)	Dandy Gallenero (PHI)	67.14 m	
3rd place, bronze medalist(s)	Kyaw Swar Mue (MYA)	64.48 m	
4	Sanya Buathong (THA)	63.47 m	

==== Decathlon ====
Summary

Rank	Athlete	100 Meters	Long Jump	Shot Put	High Jump	400 Meters	110m Hurdles	Discus	Pole Vault	Javelin	1500 Meter	Total	Notes
1st place, gold medalist(s)	Fidel Gallenero (PHI)	11.05; 850	6.83m 774	11.80m 594	1.78m 610	49.50; 838	??	??	4.40m 731	54.27m 652	4:53.74; 596	6958	
2nd place, silver medalist(s)	Boonyaket Chalon (THA)	11.39; 776	6.60m 720	11.34m 566	1.69m 536	50.74; 781	??	??	3.90m 590	56.05m 679	5:05.78; 527	6332	
3rd place, bronze medalist(s)	Roberto Fresnido (PHI)	12.00; 651	4.70m 326	12.04m 609	1.66m 512	1:00.93; 382	??	??	3.20m 406	54.15m 650	5:08.46; 512	4947	

=== Women ===
==== 100 metres ====
Round 1

- Heat 1

Wind: -0.4 m/s

Rank	Athlete	Time	Notes
1	Oranut Klomdee (THA)	11.77	
2	Irene Truitje Joseph (INA)	11.87	
3	Carol Lucia Alfred (MAS)	11.94	
4	Alinawati Ali Akbar (BRU)	12.21	
5	Nguyen Thi Thanh Huong (VIE)	12.25	

- Heat 2

Wind: -0.4 m/s

Rank	Athlete	Time	Notes
1	Supavadee Khawpeag (THA)	11.53	
2	Lerma E.Bulauitan (PHI)	11.76	
3	Supiati (INA)	11.87	
4	Hoang Thi Lan Anh (VIE)	12.09	
5	Nik Nor Azura (MAS)	13.00	

Final

Wind: 0.0 m/s

Rank	Athlete	Time	Notes
1st place, gold medalist(s)	Supavadee Khawpeag (THA)	11.33	NR
2nd place, silver medalist(s)	Oranut Klomdee (THA)	11.69	
3rd place, bronze medalist(s)	Lerma E.Bulauitan (PHI)	11.74	
4	Supiati (INA)	11.84	
5	Carol Lucia Alfred (MAS)	11.90	
6	Irene Truitje Joseph (INA)	11.94	
7	Hoang Thi Lan Anh (VIE)	12.14	
8	Alinawati Ali Akbar (BRU)	12.20	

==== 200 metres ====
Final

Wind: -0.7 m/s

Rank	Athlete	Time	Notes
1st place, gold medalist(s)	Supavadee Khawpeag (THA)	23.30	NR, GR
2nd place, silver medalist(s)	Irene Truitje Joseph (INA)	24.21	
3rd place, bronze medalist(s)	Vo Thi Ngoc Hanh (VIE)	24.70	
4	Norashikin Abdul Rahman (MAS)	24.76	
5	Carol Lucia Alfred (MAS)	24.80	
6	Hoang Thi Duyen (VIE)	24.90	
7	Alinawati Ali Akbar (BRU)	25.22	NR

==== 400 metres ====
Final

Rank	Athlete	Time	Notes
1st place, gold medalist(s)	Wassana Winatho (THA)	53.46	
2nd place, silver medalist(s)	Saipin Kaewsorn (THA)	54.91	
3rd place, bronze medalist(s)	Duong Thi Hong Hanh (VIE)	55.54	
4	Cherry (MYA)	55.63	
5	Leela Suresh Kee See Leng (MAS)	55.80	
6	Raquel Pareira Soselisa (INA)	56.59	
7	Nguyen Thi Tinh (VIE)	57.60	
8	Soo Cheng Peng (MAS)	57.97	

==== 800 metres ====
Final

Rank	Athlete	Time	Notes
1st place, gold medalist(s)	Pham Dinh Khanh Doan (VIE)	2:10.02	
2nd place, silver medalist(s)	Ester Sumah (INA)	2:11.82	
3rd place, bronze medalist(s)	Armonrat Buatharach (THA)	2:12.39	
4	Bui Thi Huyen (VIE)	2:12.43	
5	Olivia Sadi (INA)	2:13.08	
6	Nyo Nyo Win (MYA)	2:13.80	

==== 1500 metres ====
Final

Rank	Athlete	Time	Notes
1st place, gold medalist(s)	Pham Dinh Khanh Doan (VIE)	4:21.87	NR
2nd place, silver medalist(s)	Supriyati Sutono (INA)	4:25.44	
3rd place, bronze medalist(s)	Phyu War Thet (MYA)	4:26.64	
4	Olivia Sadi (INA)	4:29.76	
5	Bui Thi Huyen (VIE)	4:34.79	
6	Nyo Nyo Win (MYA)	4:42.96	

==== 5000 metres ====
Final

Rank	Athlete	Time	Notes
1st place, gold medalist(s)	Supriyati Sutono (INA)	16:08.93	GR
2nd place, silver medalist(s)	Pa Pa (MYA)	16:09.10	NR
3rd place, bronze medalist(s)	Doan Nu Truc Van (VIE)	16:40.71	NR
4	Rini Budiarti (INA)	17:10.77	
5	Phyu War Thet (MYA)	17:30.84	
6	Pacharee Chaitongsri (THA)	19:04.06	
7	Sirivanh Ketavong (LAO)	19:21.15	NR

==== 10000 metres ====
Final

Rank	Athlete	Time	Notes
1st place, gold medalist(s)	Supriyati Sutono (INA)	33:50.06	GR
2nd place, silver medalist(s)	Pa Pa (MYA)	34:04.07	
3rd place, bronze medalist(s)	Doan Nu Truc Van (VIE)	35:21.16	NR
4	Rini Budiarti (INA)	36:23.03	
5	Cristabel Martes (PHI)	36:56.41	
6	Phyu War Thet (MYA)	38:09.57	
7	Saifon Piawong (THA)	39:01.80	
—	Sirivanh Ketavong (LAO)	DNF	

==== 100 metres hurdles ====
Final

Wind: 0.0 m/s

Rank	Athlete	Time	Notes
1st place, gold medalist(s)	Trecia Roberts (THA)	13.21	
2nd place, silver medalist(s)	Moh Siew Wei (MAS)	13.43	NR
3rd place, bronze medalist(s)	Vu Bich Huong (VIE)	13.47	
4	Pattaporn Promsiri (THA)	14.28	
5	Dedeh Erawati (INA)	15.10	

==== 400 metres hurdles ====
Final

Rank	Athlete	Time	Notes
1st place, gold medalist(s)	Wassana Winatho (THA)	57.09	
2nd place, silver medalist(s)	Norasheela Mohd Khalid (MAS)	58.93	
3rd place, bronze medalist(s)	Cherry (MYA)	59.38	NR
4	Nguyen Thi Thanh Hoa (VIE)	59.89	
5	Nguyen Thi Ngan (VIE)	1.03.77	

==== 4 × 100 metres relay ====
Final

Rank	Nation	Competitors	Time	Notes
1st place, gold medalist(s)	Thailand (THA)	Jutamass Tawoncharoen, Supavadee Khawpeag, Oranut Klomdee, Trecia Roberts	44.58	
2nd place, silver medalist(s)	Vietnam (VIE)	?, ?, ?, ?	45.30	NR
3rd place, bronze medalist(s)	Malaysia (MAS)	Job, Moh Siew Wei, Norashikin Abdul Rahman, Carol Lucia Alfred	45.90	
4	Indonesia (INA)	?, ?, ?, ?	46.11	

==== 4 × 400 metres relay ====
Final

Rank	Nation	Competitors	Time	Notes
1st place, gold medalist(s)	Thailand (THA)	Oranut Klomdee, Wassana Winatho, Saipin Kaewsorn, Supavadee Khawpeag	3:38.70	
2nd place, silver medalist(s)	Vietnam (VIE)	?, ?, ?, ?	3:42.40	
3rd place, bronze medalist(s)	Malaysia (MAS)	?, ?, ?, ?	3:45.48	

==== Marathon ====
Final

Rank	Athlete	Time	Notes
1st place, gold medalist(s)	Cristabel Martes (PHI)	2:52:43	
2nd place, silver medalist(s)	Pa Pa (MYA)	2:55:51	
3rd place, bronze medalist(s)	Erni Wulatningsih (INA)	2:57:10	
—	Ruwiyati (INA)	DNF	

==== 20 km walk ====
Final

Rank	Athlete	Time	Notes
1st place, gold medalist(s)	Yuan Yufang (MAS)	1:42:55	
2nd place, silver medalist(s)	Tersiana Riwurohi (INA)	1:45:40	NR
3rd place, bronze medalist(s)	Darwati (INA)	1:47:03	
4	Thongju Piamsakul (THA)	1:55:46	NR
—	Khin Mar Soe (MYA)	DSQ	

==== High jump ====
Final

Rank	Athlete	Result	Notes
1st place, gold medalist(s)	Netnapa Thaiking (THA)	1.80 m	
2nd place, silver medalist(s)	Narcisa Atienza (PHI)	1.74 m	NR
3rd place, bronze medalist(s)	Noengruthai Chaipetch (THA)	1.74 m	

==== Pole vault ====
Final

Rank	Athlete	Result	Notes
1st place, gold medalist(s)	Ni Putu Desy Margawati (INA)	3.90 m	
2nd place, silver medalist(s)	Roslinda Samsu (MAS)	3.80 m	
3rd place, bronze medalist(s)	Nampetch Pinthong (THA)	3.70 m	NR
4	Tong My Kien Loan (VIE)	3.30 m	=NR
—	Fong Len Tze (MAS)	NM	

==== Long jump ====
Final

Rank	Athlete	Result	Notes
1st place, gold medalist(s)	Pham Thi Thu Lan (VIE)	6.46 m	
2nd place, silver medalist(s)	Lerma E.Bulauitan (PHI)	6.43 m	
3rd place, bronze medalist(s)	Nguyen Thi Bich Van (VIE)	6.37 m	
4	Elma Muros Posadas (PHI)	6.24 m	
5	Wacharee Ritthiwat (THA)	6.22 m	
6	Warunee Kittihirun (THA)	5.81 m	
7	Vilayvanh Vongphachan (LAO)	4.89 m	

==== Triple jump ====
Final

Rank	Athlete	Result	Notes
1st place, gold medalist(s)	Wacharee Ritthiwat (THA)	13.46 m	
2nd place, silver medalist(s)	Pham Thi Thu Lan (VIE)	13.09 m	
3rd place, bronze medalist(s)	Nguyen Thi Bich Van (VIE)	13.03 m	
4	Thitima Muanjan (THA)	12.30 m	
—	Vilayvanh Vongphachan (LAO)	NM	

==== Shot put ====
Final

Rank	Athlete	Result	Notes
1st place, gold medalist(s)	Juthaporn Krasaeyan (THA)	17.24 m	
2nd place, silver medalist(s)	Kruawan Taweedech (THA)	13.90 m	
3rd place, bronze medalist(s)	Aye Mon Khin (MYA)	13.17 m	
4	Aye Aye Nwe (MYA)	12.87 m	
5	Phan Thi Kim Hong (VIE)	12.26 m	

==== Discus throw ====
Final

Rank	Athlete	Result	Notes
1st place, gold medalist(s)	Juthaporn Krasaeyan (THA)	48.08 m	
2nd place, silver medalist(s)	Ibu Darminah (INA)	46.00 m	
3rd place, bronze medalist(s)	Dwi Ratnawati (INA)	45.68 m	
4	Aye Aye Nwe (MYA)	45.09 m	
5	Roselyn Hamero (PHI)	42.41 m	
6	Nham Huynh Chau (VIE)	40.15 m	NR
7	Siti Shahidah Abdullah (MAS)	37.91 m	
8	Phan Thi Kim Hong (VIE)	37.58 m	
9	Benchamas Ounkaew (THA)	24.02 m	

==== Hammer throw ====
Final

Rank	Athlete	Result	Notes
1st place, gold medalist(s)	Benchamas Ounkaew (THA)	49.84 m	NR, GR
2nd place, silver medalist(s)	Yurita Ariani (INA)	49.39 m	
3rd place, bronze medalist(s)	Siti Shahidah Abdullah (MAS)	47.75 m	NR
4	Nia Meilani Asnia (INA)	45.75 m	
5	Kruawan Taweedech (THA)	44.86 m	

==== Javelin throw ====
Final

Rank	Athlete	Result	Notes
1st place, gold medalist(s)	Buaban Phamang (THA)	54.80 m	NR, GR
2nd place, silver medalist(s)	Geralyn Amandoron (PHI)	49.85 m	
3rd place, bronze medalist(s)	Chanthana Hongsa (THA)	48.15 m	
4	Ni Ketut Mudiani (INA)	45.18 m	

==== Heptathlon ====
Results

- 100 metres hurdles

Rank	Athlete	Time	Points	Notes
1	Vu Bich Huong (VIE)	13.89	994	
2	Elma Muros Posadas (PHI)	14.53	905	
3	Kusumawadee Pewdum (THA)	15.03	838	
4	Percela Molina (PHI)	15.59	765	
5	Watcharaporn Masim (THA)	15.90	727	

- High jump

Rank	Athlete	Result	Points	Notes
1	Watcharaporn Masim (THA)	1.58	712	
2	Elma Muros Posadas (PHI)	1.55	678	
3	Percela Molina (PHI)	1.52	644	
3	Kusumawadee Pewdum (THA)	1.52	644	
5	Vu Bich Huong (VIE)	1.46	577	

- Shot put

Rank	Athlete	Result	Points	Notes
1	Elma Muros Posadas (PHI)	10.84	585	
2	Vu Bich Huong (VIE)	9.89	522	
3	Percela Molina (PHI)	9.70	510	
4	Watcharaporn Masim (THA)	9.58	502	
5	Kusumawadee Pewdum (THA)	7.31	355	

- 200 metres

Rank	Athlete	Time	Points	Notes
1	Elma Muros Posadas (PHI)	25.04	883	
2	Vu Bich Huong (VIE)	25.07	880	
3	Percela Molina (PHI)	25.59	833	
4	Kusumawadee Pewdum (THA)	26.37	765	
5	Watcharaporn Masim (THA)	29.22	538	

- Long jump

Rank	Athlete	Result	Points	Notes
1	Elma Muros Posadas (PHI)	6.06	868	
2	Percela Molina (PHI)	5.59	726	
3	Vu Bich Huong (VIE)	5.11	589	
4	Watcharaporn Masim (THA)	5.01	562	
—	Kusumawadee Pewdum (THA)	DNS	0	

- Javelin throw

Rank	Athlete	Result	Points	Notes
1	Percela Molina (PHI)	38.02	629	
2	Elma Muros Posadas (PHI)	34.05	554	
3	Watcharaporn Masim (THA)	25.52	392	
4	Vu Bich Huong (VIE)	25.37	389	

- 800 metres

Rank	Athlete	Time	Points	Notes
1	Elma Muros Posadas (PHI)	2:38.84	586	
2	Percela Molina (PHI)	2:39.42	580	
3	Vu Bich Huong (VIE)	2:48.82	476	
4	Kusumawadee Pewdum (THA)	3:02.72	340	

Summary

Rank	Athlete	100mH	HJ	SP	200m	LJ	JT	800m	Total	Notes
1st place, gold medalist(s)	Elma Muros Posadas (PHI)	905	678	585	883	868	554	586	5059	
2nd place, silver medalist(s)	Percela Molina (PHI)	765	644	510	833	726	629	580	4687	
3rd place, bronze medalist(s)	Vu Bich Huong (VIE)	994	577	522	880	589	389	476	4427	
4	Kusumawadee Pewdum (THA)	838	644	355	765	562	392	340	3896	
—	Watcharaporn Masim (THA)	727	712	502	538	DNS			DNF	

== National records by non-medallists ==
- Women's discus throw: Nham Huynh Chau (VIE) 40.15 m NR
- Women's pole vault: Tong My Kien Loan (VIE) 3.30 m =NR
- Women's 20 km walk: Thongju Piamsakul (THA) 1:55:46 min NR
- Women's 5000 metres: Sirivanh Ketavong (LAO) 19:21.15 min NR
- Women's 200 metres: Alinawati Ali Akbar (BRN) 25.22 sec NR
- Men's 4 × 100 m relay: Laos 43.00 sec =NR

== Medal table ==
* Host nation (Malaysia)

Rank	Nation	Gold	Silver	Bronze	Total
1	Thailand	22	8	11	41
2	Philippines	8	11	4	23
3	Malaysia*	8	5	9	22
4	Indonesia	3	13	6	22
5	Vietnam	3	4	10	17
6	Myanmar	1	3	5	9
7	Singapore	1	2	1	4
Totals (7 entries)		46	46	46	138
