= 2000 Asian Athletics Championships – Men's 4 × 400 metres relay =

The men's 4 × 400 metres relay event at the 2000 Asian Athletics Championships was held in Jakarta, Indonesia on 31 August.

== Results ==
Rank	Team	Name	Time	Notes
1st place, gold medalist(s)	Sri Lanka	Manura Kuranage Perera, Vellasamy Ratnakumara, Ranga Wimalawansa, Rohan Pradeep Kumara	3:02.71	NR
2nd place, silver medalist(s)	India	Purukottam Ramachandran, Manoj Lal, Lijo David Thottan, Paramjit Singh	3:02.78	
3rd place, bronze medalist(s)	Saudi Arabia	Hamdan Odha Al-Bishi, Mohammed Al-Bishi, Hamed Hamadan Al-Bishi, Hadi Soua'an Al-Somaily	3:05.00	
4	Kuwait	Khaled Atiq Al-Johar, Meshaal Saad Al-Harbi, Mohammad Al-Azemi, Fawzi Al-Shammari	3:05.66	
5	Thailand	Jirachai Linglom, Senee Kongtong, Chalermpol Noohlong, Narong Nilploy	3:05.89	
6	Philippines	Eduardo Buenavista, Jimar Aing, John Lozada, Ernie Candelario	3:16.90	
7	Singapore	C. Wee, Muhd Firdaus Juhari, Kenneth Khoo, Ng Boon Keng	3:19.21	
