= 2003 Asian Athletics Championships – Men's 400 metres =

2003 Asian challenge held in Philippines

The men's 400 metres event at the 2003 Asian Athletics Championships was held in Manila, Philippines on September 20–21.

== Medalists ==
Gold	Silver	Bronze
Fawzi Al-Shammari; Kuwait	Hamdan Odha Al-Bishi; Saudi Arabia	Yuki Yamaguchi; Japan

== Results ==
=== Heats ===
Rank	Heat	Name	Nationality	Time	Notes
1	1	Hamdan Odha Al-Bishi	Saudi Arabia	46.15	Q
2	1	Yuki Yamaguchi	Japan	46.37	Q
3	3	Sugath Thilakaratne	Sri Lanka	46.38	Q
4	2	Fawzi Al-Shammari	Kuwait	46.50	Q
5	2	Rohan Pradeep Kumara	Sri Lanka	46.72	Q
6	1	Jimar Aing	Philippines	46.82	q, PB
7	1	Manoj Lal	India	46.87	q
7	3	Mitsuhiro Sato	Japan	46.87	Q
9	3	Narong Nilploy	Thailand	46.95	SB
10	2	Mohammad Akefian	Iran	47.12	
11	2	Denis Rypakov	Kazakhstan	47.55	
12	3	Ahmad Sakeh Sumarsono	Indonesia	48.67	
13	2	Banjong Lachua	Thailand	49.05	
14	1	Saeed Al-Adhreai	Yemen	49.27	
15	2	Yan Karubaba	Indonesia	50.14	SB
16	3	Ankhbayar Tumur	Mongolia	52.18	PB
17	2	Abdullah Ibrahim	Maldives	53.63	PB

=== Final ===
Rank	Name	Nationality	Time	Notes
1st place, gold medalist(s)	Fawzi Al-Shammari	Kuwait	45.16	
2nd place, silver medalist(s)	Hamdan Odha Al-Bishi	Saudi Arabia	45.39	
3rd place, bronze medalist(s)	Yuki Yamaguchi	Japan	46.18	
4	Sugath Thilakaratne	Sri Lanka	46.21	
5	Manoj Lal	India	46.77	
6	Rohan Pradeep Kumara	Sri Lanka	46.92	
7	Jimar Aing	Philippines	46.93	
8	Mitsuhiro Sato	Japan	47.40	
