= 2000 Asian Athletics Championships – Men's 400 metres =

The men's 400 metres event at the 2000 Asian Athletics Championships was held in Jakarta, Indonesia on 28–30 August.

== Medalists ==
Gold	Silver	Bronze
Ibrahim Ismail Muftah; Qatar	Hamdan Odha Al-Bishi; Saudi Arabia	Xu Zizhou; China

== Results ==
=== Heats ===
Rank	Heat	Name	Nationality	Time	Notes
1	1	Ibrahim Ismail Muftah	Qatar	45.79	Q
2	3	Hamdan Odha Al-Bishi	Saudi Arabia	45.96	Q
3	2	Rohan Pradeep Kumara	Sri Lanka	46.15	Q
4	4	Salaheddine Bakar El-Safi	Qatar	46.37	Q
5	4	Paramjit Singh	India	46.46	Q
6	3	Purukottam Ramachandran	India	46.62	Q
7	4	Xu Zizhou	China	46.90	Q
8	1	Kazuhiro Takahashi	Japan	46.97	Q
9	1	Ernie Candelario	Philippines	47.14	Q
9	3	Ryuji Muraki	Japan	47.14	Q
11	2	Fawzi Al-Shammari	Kuwait	47.25	Q
12	1	Onisimus Windesi	Indonesia	47.51	q
13	4	Kim Jae-Da	South Korea	47.59	q
14	3	Hwang Il Sok	North Korea	47.72	q
15	1	Mohd Zaiful Zainal Abidin	Malaysia	48.10	q
16	3	Aniruth Saisood	Thailand	48.47	
17	3	Salem Masood Al-Ameeri	Bahrain	48.67	
18	2	Yuriy Gayev	Kazakhstan	48.73	Q
19	2	Jimar Aing	Philippines	48.82	
20	2	Khalid Bilal Al-Jabber	Bahrain	49.88	
21	2	Biplobuddin Bhuiyan	Bangladesh	50.36	
22	4	Mohamed Amir	Maldives	50.62	
23	4	Bazragch Batmunkh	Mongolia	51.27	
24	1	Sultan Saeed	Maldives	51.63	

=== Semifinals ===
Rank	Heat	Name	Nationality	Time	Notes
1	1	Ibrahim Ismail Muftah	Qatar	45.36	Q
2	2	Hamdan Odha Al-Bishi	Saudi Arabia	45.46	Q
3	2	Rohan Pradeep Kumara	Sri Lanka	45.65	Q
4	1	Paramjit Singh	India	45.92	Q
5	1	Xu Zizhou	China	46.16	Q
6	2	Purukottam Ramachandran	India	46.20	Q
7	2	Salaheddine Bakar El-Safi	Qatar	46.44	Q
8	1	Fawzi Al-Shammari	Kuwait	46.85	Q
9	2	Kim Jae-Da	South Korea	47.38	
10	1	Kazuhiro Takahashi	Japan	47.46	
11	2	Ernie Candelario	Philippines	47.55	
12	2	Ryuji Muraki	Japan	47.79	
13	2	Hwang Il Sok	North Korea	47.90	
14	1	Onisimus Windesi	Indonesia	48.07	
15	1	Mohd Zaiful Zainal Abidin	Malaysia	48.21	
16	1	Yuriy Gayev	Kazakhstan	48.22	

=== Final ===
Rank	Name	Nationality	Time	Notes
1st place, gold medalist(s)	Ibrahim Ismail Muftah	Qatar	44.66	NR
2nd place, silver medalist(s)	Hamdan Odha Al-Bishi	Saudi Arabia	45.32	AJR, NR
3rd place, bronze medalist(s)	Xu Zizhou	China	45.55	
4	Rohan Pradeep Kumara	Sri Lanka	45.66	
5	Paramjit Singh	India	45.82	
6	Purukottam Ramachandran	India	45.86	
7	Salaheddine Bakar El-Safi	Qatar	46.41	
8	Fawzi Al-Shammari	Kuwait	46.49	
