= Athletics at the 1998 Asian Games – Men's 400 metres =

Men's 400 metres at the 1998 Asian Games
- Venue: Thammasat Stadium
- Dates: 13–14 December 1998
- Competitors: 24 from 15 nations

Medalists
gold medal	Sugath Thilakaratne	Sri Lanka
silver medal	Ibrahim Ismail Muftah	Qatar
bronze medal	Paramjit Singh	India

The men's 400 metres competition at the 1998 Asian Games in Bangkok, Thailand was held on 13–14 December at the Thammasat Stadium.

== Schedule ==
All times are Indochina Time (UTC+07:00)

Date	Time	Event
Sunday, 13 December 1998	08:30	Heats
Sunday, 13 December 1998	14:50	Semifinals
Monday, 14 December 1998	14:50	Final

== Results ==
Legend

- DNF — Did not finish

=== Heats ===
- Qualification: First 3 in each heat (Q) and the next 4 fastest (q) advance to the semifinals.

==== Heat 1 ====
Rank	Athlete	Time	Notes
1	Sugath Thilakaratne (SRI)	46.88	Q
2	Kim Jae-da (KOR)	47.28	Q
3	Khaled Al-Johar (KUW)	47.88	Q
4	Khalifa Said (QAT)	48.38	q
5	Lei Vai Kun (MAC)	49.18	
6	Basheer Al-Khewani (YEM)	53.31	

==== Heat 2 ====
Rank	Athlete	Time	Notes
1	Paramjit Singh (IND)	46.68	Q
2	Kenji Tabata (JPN)	46.82	Q
3	Yazid Parlan (MAS)	48.37	Q
4	Chang Po-chih (TPE)	48.53	q
5	Anirut Saisut (THA)	48.77	
6	Mohammad Ayed (JOR)	49.64	

==== Heat 3 ====
Rank	Athlete	Time	Notes
1	Ibrahim Ismail Muftah (QAT)	46.65	Q
2	Shon Ju-il (KOR)	47.51	Q
3	Romzi Bakar (MAS)	47.69	Q
4	Lee Ching-yen (TPE)	48.55	
—	Puntsag-Ochiryn Pürevsüren (MGL)	DNF	
—	Shadi Qaqour (JOR)	DNF	

==== Heat 4 ====
Rank	Athlete	Time	Notes
1	Masayoshi Kan (JPN)	46.67	Q
2	Fawzi Al-Shammari (KUW)	46.81	Q
3	Rohan Pradeep Kumara (SRI)	47.02	Q
4	Senee Kongtong (THA)	47.76	q
5	Hwang Il-sok (PRK)	47.80	q
6	Hamoud Al-Hashimi (OMA)	48.94	

=== Semifinals ===
- Qualification: First 3 in each heat (Q) and the next 2 fastest (q) advance to the final.

==== Heat 1 ====
Rank	Athlete	Time	Notes
1	Ibrahim Ismail Muftah (QAT)	45.95	Q
2	Shon Ju-il (KOR)	46.55	Q
3	Kenji Tabata (JPN)	46.74	Q
4	Fawzi Al-Shammari (KUW)	47.00	q
5	Rohan Pradeep Kumara (SRI)	47.09	
6	Senee Kongtong (THA)	47.56	
7	Chang Po-chih (TPE)	48.17	
8	Yazid Parlan (MAS)	48.41	

==== Heat 2 ====
Rank	Athlete	Time	Notes
1	Sugath Thilakaratne (SRI)	45.88	Q
2	Paramjit Singh (IND)	46.37	Q
3	Masayoshi Kan (JPN)	46.50	Q
4	Kim Jae-da (KOR)	46.97	q
5	Romzi Bakar (MAS)	47.73	
6	Hwang Il-sok (PRK)	47.78	
7	Khaled Al-Johar (KUW)	48.24	
8	Khalifa Said (QAT)	48.41	

=== Final ===
Rank	Athlete	Time	Notes
1st place, gold medalist(s)	Sugath Thilakaratne (SRI)	44.99	
2nd place, silver medalist(s)	Ibrahim Ismail Muftah (QAT)	45.32	
3rd place, bronze medalist(s)	Paramjit Singh (IND)	45.93	
4	Fawzi Al-Shammari (KUW)	46.10	
5	Masayoshi Kan (JPN)	46.11	
6	Shon Ju-il (KOR)	46.19	
7	Kenji Tabata (JPN)	46.96	
8	Kim Jae-da (KOR)	47.85	
