= 2002 Asian Athletics Championships – Men's 400 metres =

The men's 400 metres event at the 2002 Asian Athletics Championships was held in Colombo, Sri Lanka on 9–10 August.

== Medalists ==
Gold	Silver	Bronze
Fawzi Al-Shammari; Kuwait	Hamdan Odha Al-Bishi; Saudi Arabia	Sugath Thilakaratne; Sri Lanka

== Results ==
=== Heats ===
Rank	Heat	Name	Nationality	Time	Notes
1	2	Hamdan Odha Al-Bishi	Saudi Arabia	45.82	Q
2	2	Rohan Pradeep Kumara	Sri Lanka	45.91	Q
3	2	Salaheddine Safi Bakar	Qatar	46.51	q, SB
4	3	Sugath Thilakaratne	Sri Lanka	46.90	Q
5	2	Ernie Candelario	Philippines	46.98	q
6	1	Fawzi Al-Shammari	Kuwait	47.20	Q
7	3	Satbir Singh	India	47.41	Q
8	1	Prasanna Amarasekara	Sri Lanka	47.60	Q
9	2	Mohd Zaiful Zainal Abidin	Malaysia	47.61	
10	1	Suguru Matsumoto	Japan	47.70	
11	3	Yukihiro Mukai	Japan	48.20	
12	3	Idris Abdelaziz Al-Housaoui	Saudi Arabia	49.11	SB
13	1	Jimar Aing	Philippines	49.50	SB
14	1	Leung Tat Wai	Hong Kong	50.30	
15	1	Chao Un Kei	Macau	50.40	SB
16	2	Ku King Kit	Hong Kong	50.71	
17	3	Khaled Ibrahim	Jordan	51.38	PB
18	3	Mohamed Amir	Maldives	52.33	SB
	1	Mohamed Akefian	Iran	DQ	
	2	Abdullah Ibrahim	Iran	DNS	

=== Final ===
Rank	Name	Nationality	Time	Notes
1st place, gold medalist(s)	Fawzi Al-Shammari	Kuwait	45.21	
2nd place, silver medalist(s)	Hamdan Odha Al-Bishi	Saudi Arabia	45.43	
3rd place, bronze medalist(s)	Sugath Thilakaratne	Sri Lanka	45.73	=SB
4	Rohan Pradeep Kumara	Sri Lanka	45.87	
5	Satbir Singh	India	46.64	
6	Prasanna Amarasekara	Sri Lanka	46.78	SB
7	Ernie Candelario	Philippines	47.60	
8	Salaheddine Safi Bakar	Qatar	47.76	
