= Manura Kuranage Perera =

Sri Lankan sprinter

Personal information
- Full name: Manura Kuranage Lanka Perera
- Nationality: Sri Lankan
- Born: 11 February 1979 (age 47) Negombo

Sport
- Sport: Sprinting
- Event: 4 × 400 metres relay
- Club: Atletica Virtus Lucca
Medal record
Men's athletics
Representing Sri Lanka
Asian Championships
Gold medal – first place	2000 Jakarta	4×400 m
Silver medal – second place	2005 Incheon	4×400 m

Manura Kuranage Lanka Perera (born 11 February 1979 in Negombo) is a Sri Lankan former sprinter. He competed in the men's 4 × 400 metres relay at the 2000 Summer Olympics.

== Biography ==
He was born in Sri Lanka. He moved to Italy, to Lucca, in January 1997, joining his family, who had migrated in 1991. To support himself, he worked various jobs, including dishwasher, bicycle renter, carpenter, guesthouse manager, and waiter, without ever giving up his athletics training. He married Sarda Thamel, with whom he had two children: Mithum Sandeepa Perera Kuranage, born in 2003, and Mithus Sankalpa, born in 2006. His eldest son, Mithum, died at the age of 23 following a motorcycle accident in Milan.

From 1998 to 2013, his club team was Virtus Lucca.

At the 2000 Asian Championships in Jakarta, he won the gold medal in the 4×400 m relay, running alongside Vellasamy Ratnakumara, Ranga Wimalawansa, and Rohan Pradeep Kumara; they set a national record in the event with a time of 3:02.71.

He represented Sri Lanka at the 2000 Summer Olympics in Sydney, where he was eliminated in the heats of the men's 4 × 400 metres relay, together with Rohan Pradeep Kumara, Ranga Wimalawansa, and Sugath Tillakeratne.

At the 2005 Asian Championships in Incheon, he won the silver medal in the 4×400 m relay, with Rohan Pradeep Kumara, Rohitha Pushpakumara, and Prasanna Amarasekara.
