= Athletics at the 2006 Asian Games – Men's 400 metres =

Asian Games competition

Men's 400 metres at the 2006 Asian Games
- Venue: Khalifa International Stadium
- Dates: 8–10 December 2006
- Competitors: 19 from 14 nations

Medalists
gold medal	Hamdan Al-Bishi	Saudi Arabia
silver medal	Brandon Simpson	Bahrain
bronze medal	Fawzi Al-Shammari	Kuwait

The men's 400 metres competition at the 2006 Asian Games in Doha, Qatar was held on 8 and 10 December 2006 at the Khalifa International Stadium.

== Schedule ==
All times are Arabia Standard Time (UTC+03:00)

Date	Time	Event
Friday, 8 December 2006	19:15	1st round
Sunday, 10 December 2006	16:45	Final

== Records ==
Prior to this competition, the existing world, Asian and Games records were as follows.

World Record	Michael Johnson (USA)	43.18	Seville, Spain	26 August 1999
Asian Record	Mohammed Al-Malki (OMA)	44.56	Budapest, Hungary	12 August 1988
Games Record	Ibrahim Ismail Muftah (QAT); Fawzi Al-Shammari (KUW)	44.93	Hiroshima, Japan; Busan, South Korea	11 October 1994; 9 October 2002

== Results ==
=== 1st round ===
- Qualification: First 2 in each heat (Q) and the next 2 fastest (q) advance to the final.

==== Heat 1 ====
Rank	Athlete	Time	Notes
1	Hamdan Al-Bishi (KSA)	46.71	Q
2	Yuki Yamaguchi (JPN)	47.33	Q
3	Fawzi Al-Shammari (KUW)	47.36	q
4	Rohan Pradeep Kumara (SRI)	47.91	
5	Chung Chen-kang (TPE)	48.00	
6	Sou Chon Kin (MAC)	50.64	

==== Heat 2 ====
Rank	Athlete	Time	Notes
1	Brandon Simpson (BRN)	46.82	Q
2	Reza Bouazar (IRI)	46.96	Q
3	Mohammed Al-Rawahi (OMA)	47.44	q
4	Julius Nierras (PHI)	48.39	
5	Adam Abdu Adam (QAT)	49.94	
6	Tserenpuntsagiin Myagmartseren (MGL)	49.96	
7	Taha Thabit (YEM)	50.53	

==== Heat 3 ====
Rank	Athlete	Time	Notes
1	Yuzo Kanemaru (JPN)	47.32	Q
2	Prasanna Amarasekara (SRI)	47.79	Q
3	Chen Chin-hsuan (TPE)	47.92	
4	Ismail Al-Sabiani (KSA)	48.01	
5	Ernie Candelario (PHI)	48.44	
6	Mohammad Miskani (SYR)	49.87	

=== Final ===
Rank	Athlete	Time	Notes
1st place, gold medalist(s)	Hamdan Al-Bishi (KSA)	45.64	
2nd place, silver medalist(s)	Brandon Simpson (BRN)	45.68	
3rd place, bronze medalist(s)	Fawzi Al-Shammari (KUW)	46.35	
4	Yuzo Kanemaru (JPN)	46.47	
5	Reza Bouazar (IRI)	47.07	
6	Yuki Yamaguchi (JPN)	47.13	
7	Prasanna Amarasekara (SRI)	47.27	
8	Mohammed Al-Rawahi (OMA)	47.71	
