= Athletics at the 1998 Asian Games – Men's 50 kilometres walk =

Men's 50 kilometres walk at the 1998 Asian Games
- Venue: Thammasat Stadium
- Dates: 18 December 1998
- Competitors: 8 from 5 nations

Medalists
gold medal	Wang Yinhang	China
silver medal	Sergey Korepanov	Kazakhstan
bronze medal	Fumio Imamura	Japan

The men's 50 kilometres walk competition at the 1998 Asian Games in Bangkok, Thailand was held on 18 December.

== Schedule ==
All times are Indochina Time (UTC+07:00)

Date	Time	Event
Friday, 18 December 1998	06:30	Final

== Results ==
Legend

- DNF — Did not finish

Rank	Athlete	Time	Notes
1st place, gold medalist(s)	Wang Yinhang (CHN)	3:59:26	
2nd place, silver medalist(s)	Sergey Korepanov (KAZ)	3:59:27	
3rd place, bronze medalist(s)	Fumio Imamura (JPN)	4:06:59	
4	Zou Menghui (CHN)	4:16:07	
5	Teoh Boon Lim (MAS)	4:45:36	
—	Sakchai Samutkao (THA)	DNF	
—	Virapun Anunchai (THA)	DNF	
—	Saravanan Govindasamy (MAS)	DNF	
