= Kenji Tabata =

Japanese sprinter

Personal information
- Nationality: Japan
- Born: 24 September 1974 (age 51) Aichi Prefecture, Japan
- Home town: Gotō Islands
- Education: Nihon University
- Height: 1.76 m (5 ft 9 in)
- Weight: 67 kg (148 lb)

Sport
- Sport: Track and field
- Event: 400 m
- Personal best(s): 200 m: 21.16 (Fukuchiyama 2002); 400 m: 45.69 (Fukuoka 1998)
Medal record
Men's athletics
Representing Japan
Asian Games
Gold medal – first place	1998 Bangkok	4×400 m relay
Asian Championships
Gold medal – first place	1998 Fukuoka	4×400 m relay
Bronze medal – third place	1998 Fukuoka	400 m
Asian Junior Championships
Gold medal – first place	1992 New Delhi	4×400 m relay
Silver medal – second place	1992 New Delhi	400 m

Kenji Tabata (田端 健児, Tabata Kenji; born 24 September 1974) is a retired Japanese sprinter who specialized in the 400 metres.

He won the bronze medal at the 1998 Asian Championships in a career best time of 45.69 seconds. He was then selected to represent Asia in 4 × 400 metres relay at the 1998 IAAF World Cup, and finished sixth with teammates Ibrahim Ismail Faraj, Sugath Tillakaratne and fellow Japanese sprinter Masayoshi Kan.

Tabata also competed at two World Championships (1999 and 2001) as well as the 2000 Summer Olympics where he failed to reach the final round.

== International competition ==
Year	Competition	Venue	Position	Event	Time	Notes
Representing Japan and Asia (World Cup only)
1992	Asian Junior Championships	New Delhi, India	2nd	400 m	47.68	
1992	Asian Junior Championships	New Delhi, India	1st	4×400 m relay	3:11.29	
1995	Universiade	Fukuoka, Japan	15th (qf)	400 m	46.76	
1995	Universiade	Fukuoka, Japan	4th	4×400 m relay	3:02.51 (relay leg: 1st)	
1996	Olympic Games	Atlanta, United States	(h)^{1}	4×400 m relay	3:02.82 (relay leg: 4th)	
1998	Asian Championships	Fukuoka, Japan	3rd	400 m	45.69	PB
1998	Asian Championships	Fukuoka, Japan	1st	4×400 m relay	3:02.61 (relay leg: 1st)	
1998	World Cup	Johannesburg, South Africa	5th	4×400 m relay	3:03.94 (relay leg: 3rd)	
1998	Asian Games	Bangkok, Thailand	7th	400 m	46.96	
1998	Asian Games	Bangkok, Thailand	1st	4×400 m relay	3:01.70 (relay leg: 2nd)	GB
1999	World Championships	Seville, Spain	31st (h)	400 m	46.42	SB
1999	World Championships	Seville, Spain	10th (h)	4×400 m relay	3:02.50 (relay leg: 3rd)	SB
2000	Olympic Games	Sydney, Australia	47th (h)	400 m	46.59	
2000	Olympic Games	Sydney, Australia	15th (sf)	4×400 m relay	3:13.63 (relay leg: 3rd)	
2001	World Championships	Edmonton, Canada	12th (h)	4×400 m relay	3:02.75 (relay leg: 1st)	SB
2002	Asian Games	Busan, South Korea	7th	400 m	46.61	
2002	Asian Games	Busan, South Korea	4th	4×400 m relay	3:05.85 (relay leg: 2nd)	
2003	World Championships	Paris, France	7th	4×400 m relay	3:03.15 (relay leg: 3rd)	

^{1}Competed only in the heat.

== National titles ==
- Japanese Championships
  - 400 m: 1998, 2002
