= Fawzi Al-Shammari =

Kuwaiti sprinter (born 1979)

Medal record

Men's athletics

Representing Kuwait

Asian Championships
Gold medal – first place	2002 Colombo	400 m
Gold medal – first place	2003 Manila	200 m
Gold medal – first place	2003 Manila	400 m
Silver medal – second place	2002 Colombo	200 m

Fawzi Dahash Awadh Al-Shammari (فوزي دهش عوض الشمري, born February 13, 1979) is a Kuwaiti former athlete who competed in the 200 and 400 metres.

== Competition record ==
Year	Competition	Venue	Position	Event	Notes
Representing Kuwait
1998	World Junior Championships	Annecy, France	3rd	400 m	45.89
1998	Asian Games	Bangkok, Thailand	4th	400 m	46.10
1998	Asian Games	Bangkok, Thailand	4th	4 × 400 m relay	3:05.75
2000	Asian Championships	Jakarta, Indonesia	8th	400 m	46.49
2000	Asian Championships	Jakarta, Indonesia	4th	4 × 400 m relay	3:05.66
2000	Olympic Games	Sydney, Australia	41st (h)	400 m	46.38
2000	Olympic Games	Sydney, Australia	–	4 × 400 m relay	DQ
2001	World Indoor Championships	Lisbon, Portugal	7th (h)	4 × 400 m relay	3:14.14 (iNR)
2002	West Asian Games	Kuwait City, Kuwait	1st	200 m	20.44
2002	West Asian Games	Kuwait City, Kuwait	1st	400 m	45.25
2002	Asian Championships	Colombo, Sri Lanka	2nd	200 m	20.92
2002	Asian Championships	Colombo, Sri Lanka	1st	400 m	45.21
2002	Asian Games	Busan, South Korea	4th	200 m	20.73
2002	Asian Games	Busan, South Korea	1st	400 m	44.93 (=NR)
2003	Asian Championships	Manila, Philippines	1st	200 m	20.70
2003	Asian Championships	Manila, Philippines	1st	400 m	45.16
2003	World Championships	Paris, France	24th (sf)	400 m	46.52
2004	Olympic Games	Athens, Greece	55th (h)	400 m	48.25
2005	Asian Championships	Incheon, South Korea	10th (h)	400 m	47.83
2005	West Asian Games	Doha, Qatar	1st	400 m	47.58
2006	Asian Games	Doha, Qatar	6th	200 m	21.61
2006	Asian Games	Doha, Qatar	3rd	400 m	46.35
2007	Asian Indoor Games	Macau	13th (h)	400 m	50.00
2009	Asian Indoor Games	Hanoi, Vietnam	14th (h)	400 m	51.06
2010	West Asian Championships	Aleppo, Syria	5th	400 m	47.74
