= Athletics at the 1998 Asian Games – Men's marathon =

Men's marathon at the 1998 Asian Games
- Venue: Thammasat Stadium
- Dates: 20 December 1998
- Competitors: 15 from 11 nations

Medalists
gold medal	Lee Bong-ju	South Korea
silver medal	Akira Manai	Japan
bronze medal	Kim Jung-won	North Korea

The men's marathon competition at the 1998 Asian Games in Bangkok, Thailand was held on 20 December.

== Schedule ==
All times are Indochina Time (UTC+07:00)

Date	Time	Event
Sunday, 20 December 1998	06:30	Final

== Results ==
Legend

- DNF — Did not finish

Rank	Athlete	Time	Notes
1st place, gold medalist(s)	Lee Bong-ju (KOR)	2:12:32	
2nd place, silver medalist(s)	Akira Manai (JPN)	2:13:25	
3rd place, bronze medalist(s)	Kim Jung-won (PRK)	2:16:30	
4	Tsutomu Sassa (JPN)	2:20:15	
5	Suyono Bejo Atmojo (INA)	2:26:49	
6	Nazirdin Akylbekov (KGZ)	2:29:38	
7	Meechai Choochip (THA)	2:30:48	
8	Jirattikarn Boonma (THA)	2:34:16	
9	Waris Masih (PAK)	2:37:54	
10	Lam Weng Hei (MAC)	2:49:51	
—	Laxman Adhikari (NEP)	DNF	
—	Hsu Gi-sheng (TPE)	DNF	
—	Ram Bahadur Basnet (NEP)	DNF	
—	Kim Yi-yong (KOR)	DNF	
—	Sok Sao (CAM)	DNF	
