= Jun Osakada =

Japanese sprinter

Personal information
- Nationality: Japan
- Born: 2 April 1974 (age 52) Kobe, Hyogo, Japan
- Education: Kyoto Sangyo University
- Height: 1.76 m (5 ft 9 in)
- Weight: 67 kg (148 lb)

Sport
- Country: Japan
- Sport: Athletics
- Event: 400 m
- Personal best(s): 100 m: 10.57 (2006) 200 m: 20.77 (1995); 300 m: 32.68 (2005) 400 m: 45.05 (2000)
Medal record
Asian Games
Gold medal – first place	1998 Bangkok	4×400 m relay
Asian Championships
Gold medal – first place	1998 Fukuoka	4×400 m relay
Silver medal – second place	1995 Jakarta	4×400 m relay
Bronze medal – third place	1995 Jakarta	200 m
East Asian Games
Gold medal – first place	2001 Osaka	4×400 m relay
Silver medal – second place	2001 Osaka	400 m

Jun Osakada (小坂田 淳, Osakada Jun; born 2 April 1974) is a male track and field sprinter from Japan.

== International competition ==
Year	Competition	Venue	Position	Event	Time	Notes
Representing Japan
1995	World Championships	Gothenburg, Sweden	52nd (h)	200 m	21.25 (wind: +2.0 m/s)	
1995	Universiade	Fukuoka, Japan	15th (sf)	200 m	21.50 (wind: +0.4 m/s)	
1995	Universiade	Fukuoka, Japan	1st (h)^{1}	4×400 m relay	3:03.89 (relay leg: 3rd)	
1995	Asian Championships	Jakarta, Indonesia	3rd	200 m	21.20 (wind: +1.8 m/s)	
1995	Asian Championships	Jakarta, Indonesia	4th	4×100 m relay	40.30 (relay leg: 4th)	
1995	Asian Championships	Jakarta, Indonesia	2nd	4×400 m relay	3:06.16 (relay leg: 3rd)	
1996	Olympic Games	Atlanta, United States	5th	4×400 m relay	3:00.76 (relay leg: 3rd)	NR
1997	East Asian Games	Busan, South Korea	(h)	200 m	27.21 (wind: +3.2 m/s)	
1998	Asian Championships	Fukuoka, Japan	1st	4×400 m relay	3:02.61 (relay leg: 2nd)	GB
1998	Asian Games	Bangkok, Thailand	1st	4×400 m relay	3:01.70 (relay leg: 1st)	GB
1999	World Indoor Championships	Maebashi, Japan	11th (sf)	400 m	46.95	
1999	World Indoor Championships	Maebashi, Japan	5th	4×400 m relay	3:06.22 (relay leg: 2nd)	
1999	World Championships	Seville, Spain	18th (qf)	400 m	45.71	
1999	World Championships	Seville, Spain	10th (h)	4×400 m relay	3:02.50 (relay leg: 1st)	SB
2000	Olympic Games	Sydney, Australia	30th (qf)	400 m	46.15	
2000	Olympic Games	Sydney, Australia	15th (sf)	4×400 m relay	3:13.63 (relay leg: 2nd)	
2001	World Indoor Championships	Lisbon, Portugal	23rd (h)	400 m	48.13	
2001	East Asian Games	Osaka, Japan	2nd	400 m	45.47	
2001	East Asian Games	Osaka, Japan	1st	4×400 m relay	3:03.74 (relay leg: 1st)	
2001	World Championships	Edmonton, Canada	39th (h)	400 m	46.86	
2001	World Championships	Edmonton, Canada	12th (h)	4×400 m relay	3:02.75 (relay leg: 2nd)	SB
2003	World Championships	Paris, France	7th (h)^{1}	4×400 m relay	3:02.35 (relay leg: 3rd)	SB
2004	Olympic Games	Athens, Greece	39th (h)	400 m	46.39	
2004	Olympic Games	Athens, Greece	4th	4×400 m relay	3:00.99 (relay leg: 2nd)	SB

^{1}Competed only in the heat.

== National titles ==
- Japanese Championships
  - 400 m: 1999, 2001

== Personal bests ==
- 400 metres - 45.05 s (2000)
