= 2000 Asian Athletics Championships – Women's 10,000 metres =

The women's 10,000 metres event at the 2000 Asian Athletics Championships was held in Jakarta, Indonesia on 28 August.

== Results ==
Rank	Name	Nationality	Time	Notes
1st place, gold medalist(s)	Supriati Sutono	Indonesia	33:47.24	
2nd place, silver medalist(s)	Aruna Devi Laishram	India	34:31.15	
3rd place, bronze medalist(s)	Hong Myung Hui	North Korea	35:27.50	
4	Chan Man Yee	Hong Kong	35:42.19	
5	Pushpa Devi	India	35:54.86	
6	Huang In-Ping	Chinese Taipei	36:04.01	
7	Zhou Chunxiu	China	38:05.99	
8	Baatarhuu Battsetseg	Mongolia	39:46.15	
