= Musayed Al-Azimi =

Kuwaiti sprinter

Personal information
- Nationality: Kuwaiti
- Born: 9 August 1969 (age 56)

Sport
- Sport: Sprinting
- Event: 4 × 400 metres relay

Musayed Ayed Al-Azimi (Arabic: مساعد عايد العازمي; born 9 August 1969) is a Kuwaiti sprinter. He competed in the men's 4 × 400 metres relay at the 2000 Summer Olympics.

In 1997, Al-Azimi ran 10.83 to win a 100 metres race in Tehran. Al-Azimi also set his 400 metres personal best of 47.81 seconds at a meeting that year.

Al-Azimi competed in the 100 m and 200 m at the 1998 Gulf Cooperation Council Athletics Championships in Muscat, Oman. He qualified for the finals in both events, finishing 5th in the 100 m in 10.57 seconds and 4th in the 200 m in 21.29 seconds.

In December 1998, Al-Azimi was selected for the Kuwaiti 4 × 400 m team at the 1998 Asian Games. Running third leg, he helped the team finish 3rd in their semi-final and advance to the finals with a 3:07.99 time. The following day, Al-Azimi again ran third leg for the Kuwaiti team in the finals, finishing fourth and just 0.03 seconds away from the bronze medal.

In 2000, Al-Azimi was selected for the Kuwaiti 4 × 400 m team at the 2000 Summer Olympics. Seeded in the fifth heat, the team was disqualified after running the race.
