= Supriyati Sutono =

Indonesian long-distance runner (born 1972)

Personal information
- Born: 24 June 1972 (age 54) Cilacap Regency, Central Java, Indonesia
Medal record
Women's athletics
Representing Indonesia
Asian Games
Gold medal – first place	1998 Bangkok	5000 m
Asian Championships
Gold medal – first place	2000 Jakarta	10,000 m
Bronze medal – third place	2000 Jakarta	5000 m
SEA Games
Gold medal – first place	1997 Jakarta	1500 m
Gold medal – first place	1997 Jakarta	5000 m
Gold medal – first place	1997 Jakarta	10,000 m
Gold medal – first place	1999 Bandar Seri Begawan	1500 m
Gold medal – first place	1999 Bandar Seri Begawan	5000 m
Gold medal – first place	2001 Kuala Lumpur	5000 m
Gold medal – first place	2001 Kuala Lumpur	10,000 m
Gold medal – first place	2003 Vietnam	5000 m
Silver medal – second place	2001 Kuala Lumpur	1500 m
Silver medal – second place	2003 Vietnam	10,000 m

Supriyati Sutono (also known as Supriati Sutono; born 24 June 1972) is an Indonesian former track and field athlete who competed in long-distance running track events. She set a number of Indonesian national records and remains the 3000 metres record holder (the others being beaten by Triyaningsih). She represented her country at the 2004 Summer Olympics.

She became Indonesia's first female athletics gold medallist at the 1998 Asian Games, winning the 5000 m, and was her country's first ever winner Asian Athletics Championships in 2000, taking the 10,000 m gold. She was also successful at the SEA Games, earning three individual medals in 1997, a career total of eight golds, and having four straight wins in the 5000 m from 1997 to 2003.

== Career ==
Born in Indonesia's Cilacap Regency, Sutono came to prominence at regional level at the 1997 SEA Games held in Jakarta, when she won an unprecedented three gold medals in the 1500 metres, 5000 metres and 10,000 metres. She won each event with a games record time. Her 1500 m run of 4:21.50 minutes proved to be a lifetime best. The 5000 m made its debut on the 1998 Asian Games programme, replacing the 3000 m, and Sutono won the inaugural race with a time of 15:54.45 minutes. She defeated a high-profile field including Olympic fourth-placer Michiko Shimizu and double Asian medallist Sunita Rani. This achievement made her Indonesia's first ever female gold medallist in the athletics competition, and only the country's second winner after Mohammed Sarengat's 1962 men's sprint/hurdles double. She also entered the 10,000 m a finished fifth. She set lifetime bests over both distances, timing 15:54.45 minutes and 32:52.45 minutes, respectively.

Sutono retained two of her three titles at the 1999 SEA Games, topping the podium in the 1500 m and 5000 m events, but relinquishing the 10,000 m to Malaysia's Yuan Yufang. She further established herself as among the continent's best distance runners at the 2000 Asian Athletics Championships. Taking the home advantage in Jakarta, she won the 10,000 m title and took a bronze medal in the 5000 m. The made her Indonesia's first gold medallist at the championships since its initiation in 1973.

She returned to the SEA Games on two more occasions. Two games records came at the 2001 SEA Games as she held off Myanmar's Pa Pa to claim a 5000 m/10,000 m double for the second time in her career. She was also a silver medallist in the 1500 m behind Pham Dinh Khanh Doan of Vietnam. She defended her 5000 m title at the 2003 SEA Games, making it four straight victories at the competition – a first for a female track athlete at the SEA Games. She came close to repeating her long-distance double but was narrowly beaten into second place in the 10,000 m by Vietnamese runner Doan Nu Truc Van.

The last major international outing of her career came on the highest stage. She was selected for the Indonesian Olympic team for the 2004 Athens Olympics. She finished nineteenth in her qualifying group with a time of 16:34.14 minutes.

== Personal bests ==
- 1500 metres – 4:21.50 (1997
- 3000 metres – 9:33.00 (1998)
- 5000 metres – 15:54.45 (1998)
- 10,000 metres – 32:52.45 (1998)

All information from IAAF profile

== International competitions ==
Year	Competition	Venue	Position	Event	Notes
1997	SEA Games	Jakarta, Indonesia	1st	1500 m	4:21.50 GR
1997	SEA Games	Jakarta, Indonesia	1st	5000 m	16:11.60 GR
1997	SEA Games	Jakarta, Indonesia	1st	10,000 m	34:02.26 GR
1998	Philippine Championships	Manila, Philippines	1st	3000 m	9:30.17
1998	Philippine Championships	Manila, Philippines	1st	5000 m	16:55.27
1998	Asian Games	Bangkok, Thailand	1st	5000 m	15:54.45 GR
1998	Asian Games	Bangkok, Thailand	5th	10,000 m	32:52.45
1999	SEA Games	Bandar Seri Begawan, Brunei	1st	1500 m	4:28.57
1999	SEA Games	Bandar Seri Begawan, Brunei	1st	5000 m	17:12.98
2000	Asian Championships	Jakarta, Indonesia	3rd	5000 m	16:03.85
2000	Asian Championships	Jakarta, Indonesia	1st	10,000 m	33:47.24
2001	SEA Games	Kuala Lumpur, Malaysia	2nd	1500 m	4:25.44
2001	SEA Games	Kuala Lumpur, Malaysia	1st	5000 m	16:08.93 GR
2001	SEA Games	Kuala Lumpur, Malaysia	1st	10,000 m	33:50.06 GR
2003	SEA Games	Hanoi, Vietnam	1st	5000 m	16:09.39
2003	SEA Games	Hanoi, Vietnam	2nd	10,000 m	34:48.93
2004	Olympic Games	Athens, Greece	19th (q)	5000 m	16:34.14
