= 2005 Asian Athletics Championships – Men's 4 × 400 metres relay =

The men's 4 × 400 metres relay event at the 2005 Asian Athletics Championships was held in Incheon, South Korea on September 2–4.

== Medalists ==
Gold	Silver	Bronze
Japan; Yuki Yamaguchi; Yuzo Kanemaru; Hideo Togashi; Mitsuhiro Sato	Sri Lanka; Rohan Pradeep Kumara; Rohitha Pushpakumara; Manura Kuranage Perera; Prasanna Amarasekara	India; Anil Kumar Rohil; Bhupinder Singh; Satbir Singh; Patlavath Shankar; Aboo Backer*

== Results ==
=== Heats ===
Rank	Heat	Nation	Athletes	Time	Notes
1	1	Sri Lanka	Rohan Pradeep Kumara, Rohitha Pushpakumara, Manura Kuranage Perera, Prasanna Amarasekara	3:07.98	Q
2	1	India	Satbir Singh, Aboo Backer, Anil Kumar Rohil, Bhupinder Singh	3:10.00	Q
3	2	Saudi Arabia	Bandar Yahya Sharahili, Bilal Al-Housaoui, Hamdan Al-Bishi, Hamed Al-Bishi	3:11.13	Q
4	1	South Korea	Kim Jae-da, Kim Jun-hyung, Choi Myong-Joon, Cho Sung-Kwon	3:11.34	Q
5	2	Japan	Hideo Togashi, Mitsuhiro Sato, Yuzo Kanemaru, Yuki Yamaguchi	3:11.65	Q
6	1	Iran	Mohammad Akefian, Reza Bouazar, Ehsan Mohajer Shojaei, Sajjad Moradi	3:11.79	q
7	2	Philippines	Julius Nierras, Jimar Aing, Ronnie Marfil, Ernie Candelario	3:12.27	Q
8	2	Kazakhstan	Boris Khamzin, Grigoriy Aksenov, Vadim Linnik, Yevgeniy Meleshenko	3:12.64	q
9	1	Chinese Taipei	Yi Wei-Chen, Liu Shih-Hsien, Chang Chi-Sheng, Lai Chun-Nan	3:15.21	

=== Final ===
Rank	Team	Name	Time	Notes
1st place, gold medalist(s)	Japan	Yuki Yamaguchi, Yuzo Kanemaru, Hideo Togashi, Mitsuhiro Sato	3:03.51	
2nd place, silver medalist(s)	Sri Lanka	Rohan Pradeep Kumara, Rohitha Pushpakumara, Manura Kuranage Perera, Prasanna Amarasekara	3:04.12	
3rd place, bronze medalist(s)	India	Anil Kumar Rohil, Bhupinder Singh, Satbir Singh, Patlavath Shankar	3:07.45	
4	Iran	Reza Bouazar, Mohammad Akefian, Ehsan Mohajer Shojaei, Sajjad Moradi	3:08.75	NR
5	South Korea	Kim Jae-da, Kim Jun-hyung, Choi Myong-Joon, Cho Sung-Kwon	3:10.60	
6	Kazakhstan	Boris Khamzin, Grigoriy Aksenov, Vadim Linnik, Yevgeniy Meleshenko	3:10.73	
7	Philippines	Julius Nierras, Jimar Aing, Ronnie Marfil, Ernie Candelario	3:11.70	
	Saudi Arabia	Hamdan Al-Bishi, Hadi Soua'an Al-Somaily, Hamed Al-Bishi, Mohammed Al-Salhi	DQ	
