= Mishal Al-Harbi (athlete) =

Kuwaiti sprinter

Mishal Sayed Al-Harbi
Personal information
- Native name: Arabic: مشعل سيد الحربي
- Nationality: Kuwaiti
- Born: Mishal Sayed Al-Harbi; Meshaal Al-Harbi; Mechel Al-Harbi; 29 January 1975 (age 51)

Sport
- Sport: Sprinting
- Event: 4 × 400 metres relay

Mishal Sayed Al-Harbi (Arabic: مشعل سيد الحربي; born 29 January 1975) is a Kuwaiti sprinter. He competed in the men's 4 × 400 metres relay at the 2000 Summer Olympics.

== Biography ==
Al-Harbi began competing internationally at the 1998 Gulf Cooperation Council Athletics Championships, winning a bronze medal. He participated in a number of other high-level competitions in 1998, including anchoring the 4th-place Kuwaiti team in the 4 × 400 m at the 1998 Asian Games.

Al-Harbi placed 5th at the 2000 Gulf Cooperation Council Athletics Championships in the 200 m, running 21.44 seconds into a headwind. At the 2000 Asian Athletics Championships 4 × 400 m, Al-Harbi ran 2nd leg for the Kuwaiti team that again finished in 4th place. He won his 400 m heat competing as a guest at the 2000 Singaporean Athletics Championships, qualifying him to represent his native country Kuwait at the 2000 Summer Olympics in the 4 × 400 m. The team was disqualified in the first round.

Al-Harbi ran his personal best of 46.05 seconds in the 400 m on 30 June 2001 at the Beirut International Military Games. He was finally able to register marks at a global championship that year, qualifying for the Lisbon 2001 IAAF World Indoor Championships in the relay and the Edmonton 2001 World Championships in Athletics individually in the 400 m. In the indoor relay, Al-Harbi ran 3rd leg for the Kuwaiti squad that finished 3rd in their heat in a national record of 3:14.14. In the individual 400 m, Al-Harbi finished 6th in his heat with a 48.19-second clocking.

Al-Harbi would continue to compete internationally until 2004.
