= Yu Yiqun =

Chinese long jumper (born 1976)

Medal record

Women's athletics

Representing China

Asian Championships
Silver medal – second place	1998 Fukuoka	Long jump

Yu Yiqun (born 12 January 1976) is a retired Chinese long jumper.

Her personal best jump was 6.77 metres, achieved at the 1998 Asian Games in Bangkok.

== Achievements ==
Year	Competition	Venue	Position	Notes
Representing China
1998	Asian Championships	Fukuoka, Japan	2nd	
1998	Asian Games	Bangkok, Thailand	2nd	6.77
