= Shon Ju-il =

South Korean sprinter

Personal information
- Born: 6 October 1969 (age 56)
- Height: 1.75 m (5 ft 9 in)
- Weight: 69 kg (152 lb)

Sport
- Sport: Athletics
- Event: 400 metres
Medal record
Men's athletics
Representing South Korea
Asian Championships
Silver medal – second place	1998 Fukuoka	4×400 m

Shon Ju-il (Korean: 손주일; born 6 October 1969) is a South Korean former sprinter who specialised in the 400 metres. He represented his country at the 1996 Summer Olympics as well as two outdoor and one indoor World Championships. In addition, he won a silver medal at the 1994 Asian Games.

His personal bests in the event are 45.37 seconds outdoors (Seoul 1994) and 46.88 seconds indoors (Tianjin 1996). Both results are standing national records.

== International competitions ==
Year	Competition	Venue	Position	Event	Notes
Representing South Korea
1994	Asian Games	Bangkok, Thailand	2nd	400 m	45.87
1994	Asian Games	Bangkok, Thailand	1st	4 × 400m relay	3:10.19
1995	World Indoor Championships	Barcelona, Spain	5th	400 m	46.90
1995	World Championships	Gothenburg, Sweden	27th (qf)	400 m	46.31
1996	Olympic Games	Atlanta, United States	42nd (h)	400 m	46.74
1997	World Championships	Athens, Greece	30th (qf)	400 m	47.36
1998	Asian Championships	Fukuoka, Japan	2nd	4 × 400m relay	3:04.44
1998	Asian Games	Bangkok, Thailand	6th	400 m	46.19
1998	Asian Games	Bangkok, Thailand	3rd	4 × 400m relay	3:05.72
