= Xu Zizhou =

Chinese sprinter

Personal information
- Born: 8 January 1981 (age 45) Hepu County, Guangxi, China

Sport
- Sport: Track and field
Medal record
Representing China
Asian Championships
Bronze medal – third place	2000 Jakarta	400 m
East Asian Games
Gold medal – first place	2001 Osaka	400 m
Silver medal – second place	2001 Osaka	4x100 m relay

Xu Zizhou (Chinese: 徐自宙; born 8 January 1981) is a Chinese former track and field sprinter. His personal best of 45.25 seconds for the 400 metres is the Chinese record for the event. He was the 400 m bronze medallist at the Asian Athletics Championships in 2000 and secured a gold medal at the 2001 East Asian Games.

He broke Chinese youth and junior records for the 400 m and was highly successful at the start of his career, representing China at the 1998 World Junior Championships in Athletics and winning the 400 m title at the 1998 World Youth Games. He was a five-time Chinese champion (four times over 400 m, once in 200 metres) and took a 200/400 m double at the National Games of China in 2001. Despite early success, he retired early in his career, ceasing to compete at age 24.

== Career ==
Born in Hepu County, Guangxi, Xu began his career as a 400 metres specialist. At the age of sixteen he was runner-up in that event at the 8th National Games of China with a Chinese youth record of 46.01 seconds. He won his first national title the following year at the 1998 Chinese Athletics Championships – the first of three consecutive Chinese titles. His debut global performance came at the 1998 World Youth Games, where he was the 400 m champion as well as the gold medallist in the 4×400 metres relay. An appearance at the 1998 World Junior Championships in Athletics came the next month, but there he failed to make the finals of either the 200 m or 400 m. Xu also claimed the 400 m title at the 1999 Chinese City Games. He was 200 metres runner-up at the 1999 Chinese Championships then claimed a 200/400 m double at the 2000 national event. He set Chinese junior records of 20.62 seconds for the 200 m and 45.55 seconds for the 400 m that year. His first international medal came at the 2000 Asian Athletics Championships, where he took the 400 m bronze.

Xu's best performances came in the 2001 season. A Chinese national record run of 45.25 seconds came at the 2001 East Asian Games, which brought him the gold medal and also a games record. His was a 200/400 m double champion at the 9th Chinese Games, setting his personal best of 20.60 seconds in the 200 m final. The 2001 Universiade was hosted in Beijing that year and Xu took fourth in the 200 m in the Chinese capital.

His 2002 was less successful: he mainly focused on the 200 m and the highlights of his season were a runner-up finish at the national championships and a fifth place at the 2002 Asian Games in a season's best of 20.77 seconds. He returned to his specialist event the following year and claimed his fourth 400 m national title at the Chinese Championships. His performances began to diminish from that year on. He was third in the 200 m at the 2004 national championships, but did not make it to the semi-finals of the 400 m. In his final year of competition in 2005 he won the 200 m title at the Asian University Athletics Championships, and was a semi-finalist in that event at the national championships. In his last major national event he helped Guangdong to the 4 × 400 m relay title, but did not go beyond the 200 m heats individually. This marked the end of his athletic career.
