= Hadi Soua'an Al-Somaily =

Saudi Arabian athlete (born 1976)

Medal record

Men's athletics

Representing Saudi Arabia

Olympic Games
Silver medal – second place	2000 Sydney	400 m hurdles

Asian Championships
Gold medal – first place	2000 Jakarta	400 m hurdles
Gold medal – first place	2005 Incheon	400 m hurdles
Silver medal – second place	1993 Manila	4×400 m
Bronze medal – third place	2000 Jakarta	4×400 m

Hadi Soua'an Al-Somaily (Arabic: هادي صوعان الصميلي, born December 30, 1976, in Ta'if) is a Saudi Arabian athlete. He won the first Saudi silver medal in the Olympics in the 400 metres hurdles, clocking a personal best time of 47.53 seconds in 2000 in Sydney. US sprinter Angelo Taylor won the race and the gold medal in 47.50 seconds.

== Competition record ==
Year	Competition	Venue	Position	Event	Notes
Representing Saudi Arabia
1994	World Junior Championships	Lisbon, Portugal	13th (sf)	400m hurdles	52.37
1994	World Junior Championships	Lisbon, Portugal	—	4 × 400 m relay	DQ
1995	World Championships	Gothenburg, Sweden	33rd (h)	400 m hurdles	50.54
1996	Olympic Games	Atlanta, United States	34th (h)	400 m hurdles	49.94
1996	Olympic Games	Atlanta, United States	15th (sf)	4 × 400 m relay	3:07.18
1999	World Championships	Seville, Spain	22nd (h)	400 m hurdles	49.88
1999	World Championships	Seville, Spain	–	4 × 400 m relay	DQ
1999	Pan Arab Games	Amman, Jordan	1st	400 m hurdles	50.02
2000	Asian Championships	Jakarta, Indonesia	1st	400 m hurdles	49.13
2000	Asian Championships	Jakarta, Indonesia	3rd	4 × 400 m relay	3:05.00
2000	Olympic Games	Sydney, Australia	2nd	400 m hurdles	47.53
2000	Olympic Games	Sydney, Australia	28th (h)	4 × 400 m relay	3:09.57
2001	World Championships	Edmonton, Canada	4th	400 m hurdles	47.99
2001	World Championships	Edmonton, Canada	17th (h)	4 × 400 m relay	3:04.22
2001	Goodwill Games	Brisbane, Australia	3rd	400 m hurdles	48.94
2002	West Asian Games	Kuwait City, Kuwait	1st	400 m hurdles	49.04
2002	Asian Games	Busan, South Korea	1st	400 m hurdles	48.42
2002	Asian Games	Busan, South Korea	1st	4 × 400 m relay	3:02.47
2003	World Championships	Paris, France	16th (sf)	400 m hurdles	49.25
2003	World Championships	Paris, France	–	4 × 400 m relay	DQ
2004	Olympic Games	Athens, Greece	15th (sf)	400 m hurdles	48.98
2004	Pan Arab Games	Algiers, Algeria	1st	400 m hurdles	48.77
2004	Pan Arab Games	Algiers, Algeria	1st	4 × 400 m relay	3:03.03
2005	Islamic Solidarity Games	Mecca, Saudi Arabia	2nd	400 m hurdles	50.78
2005	Islamic Solidarity Games	Mecca, Saudi Arabia	1st	4 × 400 m relay	3:04.35
2005	World Championships	Helsinki, Finland	11th (sf)	400 m hurdles	49.09
2005	World Championships	Helsinki, Finland	–	4 × 400 m relay	DQ
2005	Asian Championships	Incheon, South Korea	1st	400 m hurdles	49.16
2005	Asian Championships	Incheon, South Korea	–	4 × 400 m relay	DQ
2006	Asian Games	Doha, Qatar	5th	400 m hurdles	50.69
