= 1995 IAAF World Indoor Championships – Men's 400 metres =

The men's 400 metres event at the 1995 IAAF World Indoor Championships was held on 10–12 March.

== Medalists ==
Gold	Silver	Bronze
Darnell Hall; United States	Sunday Bada; Nigeria	Mikhail Vdovin; Russia

== Results ==
=== Heats ===
First 2 of each heat (Q) and next 2 fastest (q) qualified for the semifinals.

Rank	Heat	Name	Nationality	Time	Notes
1	2	Darnell Hall	United States	46.32	Q
2	2	Sunday Bada	Nigeria	46.79	Q
3	1	Calvin Davis	United States	46.99	Q
4	1	Eswort Coombs	Saint Vincent and the Grenadines	47.17	Q
5	1	Ashraf Saber	Italy	47.18	q
6	2	Mikhail Vdovin	Russia	47.20	q
7	5	Julian Völkel	Germany	47.33	Q
8	5	Michael Joubert	Australia	47.34	Q
9	2	Seiji Inagaki	Japan	47.59	
9	3	Ibrahim Ismail Muftah	Qatar	47.59	Q
11	4	Karsten Just	Germany	47.63	Q
12	2	Paul Slythe	Great Britain	47.66	
13	4	Shon Ju-il	South Korea	47.74	Q
14	5	Evripides Demosthenous	Cyprus	47.95	
15	3	Carlos Silva	Portugal	47.99	Q
16	5	Bouchaib Belkaid	Morocco	48.01	
17	3	Hiroyuki Hayashi	Japan	48.07	
17	4	Benyounés Lahlou	Morocco	48.07	
19	3	Bülent Eren	Turkey	48.09	
20	4	Désiré Pierre-Louis	Mauritius	48.14	
21	1	Wilson Cañizales	Colombia	49.32	
22	5	Muhamed Amin	Pakistan	50.23	
23	3	Mark Hylton	Great Britain	50.26	
24	4	Mukandila Kabongo	Zaire	51.60	
	4	Andrea Nuti	Italy	DQ	R141.3
	3	Antonio Sánchez	Spain	DNF	
	1	Lei Hong Wa	Macau	DNS	
	1	Mohamad Shaman	Jordan	DNS	
	5	Kennedy Ochieng	Kenya	DNS	

=== Semifinals ===
First 3 of each semifinal qualified directly (Q) for the final.

Rank	Heat	Name	Nationality	Time	Notes
1	1	Sunday Bada	Nigeria	46.41	Q
2	1	Calvin Davis	United States	46.53	Q
3	2	Mikhail Vdovin	Russia	46.91	Q
4	2	Darnell Hall	United States	46.92	Q
5	1	Carlos Silva	Portugal	46.94	Q
6	1	Ashraf Saber	Italy	47.33	
7	2	Shon Ju-il	South Korea	47.48	Q
8	2	Karsten Just	Germany	47.53	
9	1	Eswort Coombs	Saint Vincent and the Grenadines	47.63	
10	2	Michael Joubert	Australia	47.78	
11	1	Julian Völkel	Germany	47.81	
	2	Ibrahim Ismail Muftah	Qatar	DNS	

=== Final ===
Rank	Name	Nationality	Time	Notes
1st place, gold medalist(s)	Darnell Hall	United States	46.17	
2nd place, silver medalist(s)	Sunday Bada	Nigeria	46.38	
3rd place, bronze medalist(s)	Mikhail Vdovin	Russia	46.65	
4	Carlos Silva	Portugal	46.87	
5	Shon Ju-il	South Korea	46.90	
6	Calvin Davis	United States	47.19	
