= Darnell Hall =

American sprinter (born 1971)

Personal information
- Born: September 26, 1971 (age 55) Detroit, Michigan, U.S.
Medal record
Men's athletics
Representing the United States
Olympic Games
Gold medal – first place	1992 Barcelona	4 × 400 metres relay
World Indoor Championships
Gold medal – first place	1993 Toronto	4 × 400 m metres relay
Gold medal – first place	1995 Barcelona	400 metres

Darnell Kenneth Hall (born September 26, 1971) is an American sprinter who specialized in the 400 metres. He ran for the later gold-winning Team USA in the preliminary heats of the men's 4 × 400 m relay at the 1992 Summer Olympics.

== Athletic career ==
Hall, who grew up in Sojourner Truth public housing in Detroit, he ran high school track for Detroit's Pershing High School, winning the state championship in the 400 m with a time of 47.56 seconds. Hall attended Blinn College in Texas. Instead of transferring to an NCAA Division I school, at the age of 21 he decided to try for the 1992 US Olympic Team, and succeeded, winning a gold medal with the 4 × 400 m relay team.

Hall won the 1995 IAAF World Indoor Championships in Barcelona and finished sixth at the 1995 World Championships in Athletics in Gothenburg. At the 1993 IAAF World Indoor Championships he was on the 4 × 400 m relay team that won the gold medal.

His personal best 400 m time is 44.34 seconds, achieved in July 1995 in Lausanne.

== Post-athletic career ==
Hall is a policeman in the Detroit Police Department. and he now runs a AAU youth track team
