= Roy Vence =

Filipino long-distance runner

Personal information
- Nationality: Filipino
- Born: February 22, 1966 (age 60) Bogo, Cebu
- Height: 5 ft 6 in (168 cm)
- Weight: 104 lb (47 kg)

Sport
- Sport: Long-distance running
- Event: Marathon

Roy Vence (born February 22, 1966) is a Filipino long-distance runner. He competed in the men's marathon at the 1996 Summer Olympics.
