= Fareh Ibrahim Ali =

Qatari sprinter

Personal information
- Nationality: Qatari
- Born: 22 August 1974 (age 51)

Sport
- Sport: Sprinting
- Event: 4 × 400 metres relay
Medal record
Men's athletics
Representing Qatar
Asian Championships
| Gold medal – first place | 1995 Jakarta | 4×400 m |

Fareh Ibrahim Ali (Arabic: فارح إبراهيم علي; born 22 August 1974) is a Qatari sprinter. He competed in the men's 4 × 400 metres relay at the 1992 Summer Olympics.
