= Irene Joseph =

Indonesian sprinter

Personal information
- Nationality: Indonesian
- Born: 14 October 1981 (age 44)

Sport
- Sport: Sprinting
- Event: 100 metres

Irene Joseph (born 14 October 1981) is an Indonesian sprinter. She competed in the women's 100 metres at the 2000 Summer Olympics.
