= Wang Yinhang =

Chinese racewalker

Wang Yinhang (simplified Chinese: 王银行; traditional Chinese: 王銀行; pinyin: Wáng Yínháng; born February 15, 1977) is a male Chinese race walker.

== Achievements ==
Year	Competition	Venue	Position	Notes
Representing China
1998	Asian Games	Bangkok, Thailand	1st	50 km
1999	World Championships	Seville, Spain	18th	50 km
2000	Olympic Games	Sydney, Australia	13th	50 km
2002	World Race Walking Cup	Turin, Italy	16th	50 km
2003	World Championships	Paris, France	DSQ	50 km
