= Cherry (hurdler) =

Burmese hurdler

Personal information
- Nationality: Burmese
- Born: 24 September 1973 (age 52)

Sport
- Sport: Track and field
- Event: 400 metres hurdles

Cherry (born 24 September 1973) is a Burmese hurdler. She competed in the women's 400 metres hurdles at the 2000 Summer Olympics.
