= Athletics at the 1998 Asian Games – Women's long jump =

Women's long jump at the 1998 Asian Games
- Venue: Thammasat Stadium
- Dates: 17 December 1998
- Competitors: 11 from 8 nations

Medalists
gold medal	Guan Yingnan	China
silver medal	Yu Yiqun	China
bronze medal	Yelena Pershina	Kazakhstan

The women's long jump competition at the 1998 Asian Games in Bangkok, Thailand was held on 17 December at the Thammasat Stadium.

== Schedule ==
All times are Indochina Time (UTC+07:00)

Date	Time	Event
Thursday, 17 December 1998	14:30	Final

== Results ==
Legend

- DNS — Did not start

Rank	Athlete	Result	Notes
1st place, gold medalist(s)	Guan Yingnan (CHN)	6.89	
2nd place, silver medalist(s)	Yu Yiqun (CHN)	6.77	
3rd place, bronze medalist(s)	Yelena Pershina (KAZ)	6.55	
4	Ri Yong-ae (PRK)	6.39	
5	Hitomi Takamatsu (JPN)	6.31	
6	Wang Kuo-hui (TPE)	6.26	
7	Nguyễn Bích Vân (VIE)	6.25	
8	Yelena Koshcheyeva (KAZ)	6.07	
9	Nayanthi Chandrasena (SRI)	5.93	
10	Anoma Sooriyaarachchi (SRI)	5.70	
—	Elma Muros-Posadas (PHI)	DNS	
