= Kim Jung-won =

North Korean long-distance runner (born 1973)

Personal information
- Nationality: North Korean
- Born: 20 January 1973 (age 53)

Korean name
- Hangul: 김중원
- RR: Gim Jungwon
- MR: Kim Chungwŏn

Sport
- Sport: Long-distance running
- Event: Marathon
Medal record
Men's Athletics
Representing North Korea
Asian Games
Bronze medal – third place	1998 Bangkok	Marathon

Kim Jung-won (born 20 January 1973) is a North Korean long-distance runner. He competed in the men's marathon at the 1996 Summer Olympics and the 2000 Summer Olympics. Kim is married to fellow marathoner Jong Song-ok since March 2001. The couple's first child, Hyo-il, was born in 2002. Jong stated that North Korean leader Kim Jong Il personally suggested the name.
