= Hamdan Al-Bishi =

Saudi Arabian sprinter

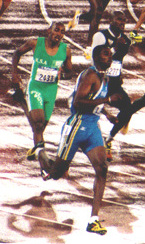
- Hamdan Al-Bishi (left) in 2000

Medal record

Men's athletics

Representing Saudi Arabia

Asian Championships
Silver medal – second place	2000 Jakarta	400 m
Silver medal – second place	2002 Colombo	400 m
Silver medal – second place	2003 Manila	400 m
Bronze medal – third place	2000 Jakarta	4×400 m

Hamdan Odha Al-Bishi (Arabic: حمدان عوضه البيشي) (born 5 May 1981 in Bisha) is a Saudi Arabian sprinter.

Besides earning laurels for his country, Al-Bishi also has been a sprinting coach and coached Yousef Masrahi after he returned to sprinting after his ban.

== Achievements ==
Year	Competition	Venue	Position	Event	Notes
Representing Saudi Arabia
1998	World Junior Championships	Annecy, France	16th (sf)	400m	47.47
2000	Asian Championships	Jakarta, Indonesia	2nd	400 m	45.32
2000	Asian Championships	Jakarta, Indonesia	3rd	4 × 400 m relay	3:05.00
2000	World Junior Championships	Santiago, Chile	1st	400 m	44.66 (CR & AJR)
2001	World Championships	Edmonton, Canada	5th	400 m	45.23
2002	Asian Championships	Colombo, Sri Lanka	2nd	400 m	45.43
2002	Asian Games	Busan, South Korea	2nd	400 m	44.95
2002	Asian Games	Busan, South Korea	1st	4 × 400 m relay	3:02.47
2003	Asian Championships	Manila, Philippines	7th	200 m	21.39
2003	Asian Championships	Manila, Philippines	2nd	400 m	45.39
2004	Pan Arab Games	Algiers, Algeria	1st	400 m	45.04
2005	Islamic Solidarity Games	Mecca, Saudi Arabia	2nd	400 m	45.57
2005	Islamic Solidarity Games	Mecca, Saudi Arabia	1st	4 × 400 m relay	3:04.35
2005	Asian Championships	Incheon, South Korea	2nd	400 m	45.39
2005	Asian Championships	Incheon, South Korea	–	4 × 400 m relay	DQ
2006	Asian Games	Doha, Qatar	1st	4 × 400 m relay	3:05.31
2007	Pan Arab Games	Cairo, Egypt	2nd	400 m	46.50
2007	Pan Arab Games	Cairo, Egypt	1st	4 × 400 m relay	3:04.74

=== Personal bests ===
- 200 metres – 20.81 s (2004)
- 400 metres – 44.66 s (2000)
