= Fumio Imamura =

Japanese racewalker (born 1966)

Fumio Imamura (Japanese: 今村 文男; born November 5, 1966, in Chiba) is a retired male race walker from Japan. He twice competed for his native country at the Summer Olympics: 1992 and 2000.

== International competitions ==
Representing Japan
Year	Competition	Venue	Position	Event	Notes
1991	World Race Walking Cup	San Jose, United States	12th	50 km	
1991	World Championships	Tokyo, Japan	7th	50 km	
1992	Olympic Games	Barcelona, Spain	18th	50 km	
1993	World Championships	Stuttgart, Germany	20th	50 km	
1994	Asian Games	Hiroshima, Japan	2nd	50 km	
1995	World Championships	Gothenburg, Sweden	20th	50 km	
1997	World Championships	Athens, Greece	6th	50 km	
1998	Asian Games	Bangkok, Thailand	2nd	50 km	
1999	World Championships	Seville, Spain	15th	50 km	
2000	Olympic Games	Sydney, Australia	36th	50 km	
2001	World Championships	Edmonton, Canada	29th	50 km	
2003	World Championships	Paris, France	DQ	50 km	
