= Masayoshi Kan =

Japanese sprinter (born 1972)

Personal information
- Born: 25 February 1972 (age 54) Chiba, Japan

Sport
- Sport: Track and field
Medal record
Representing Japan
World Indoor Championships
Bronze medal – third place	1993 Toronto	4x400 m relay
Bronze medal – third place	1995 Barcelona	4x400 m relay
Summer Universiade
Silver medal – second place	1993 Buffalo	4x400 m relay
Asian Games
Gold medal – first place	1998 Bangkok	4x400 m relay
Asian Championships
Gold medal – first place	1991 Kuala Lumpur	4×400 m relay
Gold medal – first place	1998 Fukuoka	4×400 m relay
Silver medal – second place	1998 Fukuoka	400 m

Masayoshi Kan (簡 優好, Kan Masayoshi; born 25 February 1972) is a retired Japanese sprinter who specialized in the 400 metres. He competed at the 1992 Summer Olympics.

He won bronze medals in 4 × 400 metres relay at the 1993 and 1995 World Indoor Championships

In 1998 he won the silver medal at the Asian Championships, and was subsequently selected to represent Asia in 4 × 400 metres relay at the 1998 IAAF World Cup. The Asian team finished sixth with teammates Ibrahim Ismail Faraj, Sugath Tillakaratne and fellow Japanese Kenji Tabata. In May the same year he clocked a career best time of 45.33 seconds in Osaka.

== International competitions ==
Representing Japan
Year	Competition	Venue	Position	Event	Notes
1990	World Junior Championships	Plovdiv, Bulgaria	26th (h)	400m	48.49
1990	World Junior Championships	Plovdiv, Bulgaria	7th	4 × 400 m relay	3:07.58
1998	Asian Championships	Fukuoka, Japan	2nd	400 m	45.64
