= Lijo David Thottan =

Indian sprinter

Personal information
- Nationality: Indian
- Born: 1 June 1974 (age 52)

Sport
- Sport: Sprinting
- Event: 4 × 400 metres relay
Medal record
Men's athletics
Representing India
Asian Championships
Silver medal – second place	2000 Jakarta	4×400 m

Lijo David Thottan (born 1 June 1974) is an Indian sprinter. He competed in the men's 4 × 400 metres relay at the 2000 Summer Olympics.
