= Jata Shankar =

Indian sprinter

Personal information
- Nationality: Indian
- Born: 20 June 1972 (age 54)

Sport
- Sport: Sprinting
- Event: 4 × 400 metres relay
Medal record
Men's athletics
Representing India
Asian Championships
Silver medal – second place	2002 Colombo	4×400 m

Jata Shankar (born 20 June 1972) is an Indian sprinter. He competed in the men's 4 × 400 metres relay at the 2000 Summer Olympics.
