= Jirachai Linglom =

Thai sprinter (born 1978)

Personal information
- Nationality: Thai
- Born: 13 October 1978 (age 47) Thailand

Sport
- Sport: Track and Field
- Events: 400 m hurdles and 4 × 400 m relay

Achievements and titles
- Personal bests: 100 m: 10.62 (2002); 400 m: 48.55 (1996); 400 m Hurdles: 50.63 (2001)
Medal record
Men's Athletics
Representing Thailand
Southeast Asian Games
Gold medal – first place	2001 Kuala Lumpur	400 m Hurdles
Gold medal – first place	2001 Kuala Lumpur	4 × 400 m Relay

Jirachai Linglom (born 13 October 1978 in Thailand) is a Thai sprinter who competed in the 2000 Summer Olympics and other prestigious track and field competitions. Linglom's two main events are the 400 metre hurdles and the 4 × 400 metre relay.

== International competitions ==
Year	Competition	Venue	Position	Notes
Representing the Thailand
2000	Olympics	Sydney, Australia	30th	4 × 400 m Relay
2001	Southeast Asian Games	Kuala Lumpur, Malaysia	1st	400 m Hurdles
2001	Southeast Asian Games	Kuala Lumpur, Malaysia	1st	4 × 400 m Relay

== Personal bests ==
Event	Time	Date	Location
100 m	10.62	21 June 2002	Hedelberg, Germany
400 m	48.55	?.?.1996	?
400 m Hurdles	50.63	16 September 2001	Kuala Lumpur, Malaysia
4 × 400 m Relay	3:11.65	29 September 2000	Sydney Australia
