= Chalermpol Noohlong =

Thai sprinter (born 1975)

Personal information
- Nationality: Thai
- Born: 3 June 1975 (age 51)

Sport
- Sport: Sprinting
- Event: 4 × 400 metres relay

Chalermpol Noohlong (born 3 June 1975) is a Thai sprinter. He competed in the men's 4 × 400 metres relay at the 2000 Summer Olympics.
