= Salaheddine Al-Safi =

Qatari sprinter (born 1980)

Salaheddine Bakar Al-Safi
Personal information
- Nationality: Qatari
- Born: 1 April 1980 (age 45)

Sport
- Sport: Sprinting
- Event: 400 metres

Salaheddine Bakar Al-Safi (born 1 April 1980) is a Qatari sprinter. He competed in the men's 400 metres at the 2000 Summer Olympics.
