= Purukottam Ramachandran =

Indian sprinter

Personal information
- Nationality: Indian
- Born: 20 May 1971 (age 55)

Sport
- Sport: Sprinting
- Event: 4 × 400 metres relay
Medal record
Men's athletics
Representing India
Asian Championships
Silver medal – second place	2000 Jakarta	4×400 m

Purukottam Ramachandran (born 20 May 1971) is an Indian sprinter who competed in the men's 4 × 400 metres relay at the 2000 Summer Olympics.
