= Narong Nilploy =

Thai sprinter (born 1979)

Personal information
- Nationality: Thai
- Born: 22 October 1979 (age 46)

Sport
- Sport: Sprinting
- Event: 4 × 400 metres relay

Narong Nilploy (born 22 October 1979) is a Thai sprinter. He competed in the men's 4 × 400 metres relay at the 2000 Summer Olympics.
