= Paramjit Singh (sprinter) =

Indian sprinter

Medal record

Men's athletics

Representing India

Asian Championships
Silver medal – second place	2000 Jakarta	4×400 m

Paramjit Singh (born August 22, 1971) is an Indian athlete who competed in the 400m at the 2000 Olympics.

In 1998 Paramjit Singh broke the 38-year-old National record for the 400m that had been set by Milkha Singh. He was also part of the Indian relay team that won a silver medal in the 4 x 400 m relay at the 1998 Asian Games. The team set the Indian national record in the event.
