= Senee Kongtong =

Thai sprinter (born 1976)

Personal information
- Nationality: Thai
- Born: 16 September 1976 (age 49)

Sport
- Sport: Sprinting
- Event: 4 × 400 metres relay

Senee Kongtong (born 16 October 1976) is a Thai sprinter. He competed in the men's 4 × 400 metres relay at the 2000 Summer Olympics.
