= Sugath Thilakaratne =

Sri Lankan sprinter and politician (born 1973)

Hon. Sugath Thilakaratne MP

Member of Parliament for National List
- Incumbent
- Assumed office 21 November 2024

Personal details
- Party: Janatha Vimukthi Peramuna
- Other political affiliations: National People's Power
- Sports career
- Native name: සුගත් තිලකරත්න
- Full name: Robosingho Arachchilage Don Sugath Thilakaratne
- Nickname: Vidulipura Kangawena (Unicorn of Vidulipura)
- Nationality: Sri Lankan
- Born: July 30, 1973 (age 52) Norton Bridge, Sri Lanka
- Education: Vidulipura Maha Vidyalaya
- Years active: 1992-2008
- Spouse: Dulani Chaturika (m. 2003)
- Children: 2
- Country: Sri Lanka
- Sport: Track and field
- Event: Sprint
Medal record
Men's athletics
Representing Sri Lanka
Event	1st	2nd	3rd
Asian Games	1	0	1
Asian Championships	3	0	5
Commonwealth Games	0	0	1
Total	4	0	7
Event	1st	2nd	3rd
400 m	4	0	7
Asian Games
Gold medal – first place	1998 Bangkok	400 m
Bronze medal – third place	1998 Bangkok	200 m
Asian Championship
Gold medal – first place	1998 Fukuoka	400 m
Gold medal – first place	2002 Colombo	4×400 m
Gold medal – first place	2003 Manila	4×400 m
Bronze medal – third place	1993 Manila	4×400 m
Bronze medal – third place	1995 Jakarta	400 m
Bronze medal – third place	1995 Jakarta	4×400 m
Bronze medal – third place	1998 Fukuoka	4×400 m
Bronze medal – third place	2002 Colombo	400 m
Commonwealth Games
Bronze medal – third place	1998 Kuala Lumpur	400 m
- Updated on 24 November 2015

Deshabandu Robosingho Arachchilage Don Sugath Thilakaratne (born July 30, 1973), commonly as Sugath Thilakaratne, is a Sri Lankan retired sprinter and a politician. Specialized in the 400 metres, Thilakaratne is the current record holder for the 400m event at the Asian Athletics Championships.

== Personal life ==
Thilakaratne was born on 30 July 1973 in Norton Bridge, Nuwara Eliya. His mother was M. G. R. Lisinona and his father was R. A. Appuhamy. Thilakaratne has three brothers: R. A. Ariyachandra, R. M. Wickremaweera, R. A. Nihal Jayaratne, Sugath Thilakaratne and one sister: Suneetha Chandrakanthi. He entered Vidulipura Maha Vidyalaya for his education in 1979 and started athletics at very little age.

He is married to former athlete Dulani Chaturika where the wedding was celebrated on 8 September 2003. The couple has one daughter, Thevini Dinara and one son, Dehan Akanath.

== Career ==
He started to practice under the coaches, Jayalath Senake Premawansa and Padmawathi, where he contested in 50 metres, 75 metres, 100 metres and 200 metres during school life. After seeing his talents, Anura Bandara, then Ambagamuwa Maha Vidyalaya coach, advised him to participate in the 400 metres. Under his guidance, he won the 400m event at the Nuwara Eliya District Meet in 1993. Then he won the 400m event in 48.50 seconds with a new record at the All-Island Schools athletics championship. In the same year, Thilakaratne, Damith De Silva, Mahinda Gunawardane, and Suresh Dematapitiya won the 4X400 relay event by beating the Indian team for the first time.

In 1994, he was selected for the South Asian Games trials with a new Sri Lanka record in the 400m, clocking a time of 47.17. In the coming years, he contested in four South Asian Games and won six gold medals. In 1995, he finished the final with a time of 46.21 seconds and won the bronze medal at the 1995 Asian Athletics Championships. In 1996 he contested in the Atlanta Olympics, where he beat the 400-metre world record holder Michael Johnson of the United States of America, in a preliminary round with a time of 44.78 seconds. However, his best came in 1998, when he dominated the track in both the Asian and Commonwealth championships, where he won the bronze medal at the 1998 Commonwealth Games with a time of 44.64 seconds. In that year, he clocked 44.61 sec. at the 1998 Asian Athletics Championships and won the gold medal with a record, which currently stands as well. He improved his personal best by almost a second to 44.61 and subsequently won medals in three international championships. Later in the year, Thilakaratne won the gold medal with a time of 44.99 seconds at the 1998 Asian Games.

In 2000, he contested in Sydney Olympics. His best performance in a major global competition was in the 2001 World Championships where he reached the semi-final. In 2002 Commonwealth Games, he won the second place by recording a time of 46.80 seconds in the 3rd preliminary round. Then in the 4th heat of the semi-finals, he recorded a time of 46.48 seconds and qualified for the semi-finals. But in the 2nd semi-final, he finished in 6th place with a time of 45.79 seconds and did not qualify for the final. At the 2002 Asian Athletics Championships, Thilakaratne won the bronze medal by finishing in 45.73 seconds.

== Post-retirement ==
After his retirement in 2008, he worked as an Assistant Manager Marketing in Sri Lanka Telecom. In 2011, he was appointed as a member of the National Sports Council, by then sports minister C. B. Ratnayake. Sugath also worked as the President of the Sri Lanka Athletic Association. He was appointed to the post on 14 May 2015. In 2019, he worked in the Petroleum Corporation.

Thilakaratne was listed in the National List of the National People's Power in the 2024 Sri Lankan parliamentary election. He was successfully appointed to parliament and named as the Deputy Minister of Sports in President Anura Kumara Dissanayake's cabinet. Thilakaratne is the first Olympic athlete to enter the Sri Lankan parliament.

== Achievements ==
Year	Competition	Venue	Position	Notes
Representing Sri Lanka
1998	Asian Championships	Fukuoka, Japan	1st	400 m
1998	Asian Games	Bangkok, Thailand	1st	
1998	Commonwealth Games	Kuala Lumpur, Malaysia	3rd	
2002	Asian Championships	Colombo, Sri Lanka	3rd	
