= Rohan Pradeep Kumara =

Sri Lankan sprinter (born 1975)

Medal record

Men's athletics

Representing Sri Lanka

Asian Championships
Gold medal – first place	2000 Jakarta	4×400 m
Gold medal – first place	2002 Colombo	4×400 m
Gold medal – first place	2003 Manila	4×400 m
Silver medal – second place	2005 Incheon	4×400 m
Bronze medal – third place	1998 Fukuoka	4×400 m
Bronze medal – third place	2005 Incheon	400 m

Rohan Handunpurage Pradeep Kumara (born 10 March 1975) is a Sri Lankan athlete who competed in the Men's 400 meters at the 2004 Summer Olympic Games, and did not pass the first round.

Kumara finished 400m Round 1's fourth heat at a time of 46.20 seconds and was placed fifth. Though he lost at the Olympics, he has won events at other competitions in Asia.

He finished 3rd at the 2002 Asian Games with a time of 45.87 seconds. His personal record is 45.25, set in 2000.
