= Athletics at the 2006 Asian Games – Women's 400 metres hurdles =

Women's 400 metres hurdles at the 2006 Asian Games
- Venue: Khalifa International Stadium
- Dates: 10 December 2006
- Competitors: 7 from 6 nations

Medalists
gold medal	Huang Xiaoxiao	China
silver medal	Satomi Kubokura	Japan
bronze medal	Noraseela Mohd Khalid	Malaysia

The women's 400 metres hurdles competition at the 2006 Asian Games in Doha, Qatar was held on 10 December 2006 at the Khalifa International Stadium.

== Schedule ==
All times are Arabia Standard Time (UTC+03:00)

Date	Time	Event
Sunday, 10 December 2006	17:10	Final

== Records ==
Prior to this competition, the existing world, Asian and Games records were as follows.

World Record	Yuliya Pechonkina (RUS)	52.34	Tula, Russia	8 August 2003
Asian Record	Han Qing (CHN); Song Yinglan (CHN)	53.96	Beijing, China; Guangzhou, China	9 September 1993; 22 November 2001
Games Record	Leng Xueyan (CHN)	55.26	Hiroshima, Japan	14 October 1994

== Results ==
Rank	Athlete	Time	Notes
1st place, gold medalist(s)	Huang Xiaoxiao (CHN)	55.41	
2nd place, silver medalist(s)	Satomi Kubokura (JPN)	56.49	
3rd place, bronze medalist(s)	Noraseela Mohd Khalid (MAS)	56.85	
4	Wassana Winatho (THA)	57.19	
5	Galina Pedan (KGZ)	58.12	
6	Tatyana Azarova (KAZ)	58.80	
7	Makiko Yoshida (JPN)	58.90	
