= 2000 Asian Athletics Championships – Women's 200 metres =

The women's 200 metres event at the 2000 Asian Athletics Championships was held in Jakarta, Indonesia on 29–31 August.

== Medalists ==
Gold	Silver	Bronze
Damayanthi Dharsha; Sri Lanka	Lyubov Perepelova; Uzbekistan	Vinita Tripathi; India

== Results ==
=== Heats ===
Wind:
Heat 1: +0.8 m/s, Heat 2: +0.5 m/s, Heat 3: +0.5 m/s

Rank	Heat	Name	Nationality	Time	Notes
1	2	Damayanthi Dharsha	Sri Lanka	23.11	Q
2	2	Yan Jiankui	China	23.32	Q
3	3	Lyubov Perepelova	Uzbekistan	23.50	Q
4	3	Chen Yueqin	China	23.54	Q
5	3	Rachita Mistry	India	23.60	q
6	2	Vinita Tripathi	India	23.61	q
7	2	Supavadee Khawpeak	Thailand	24.17	
8	1	Alyona Petrova	Turkmenistan	24.43	Q, NR
9	2	Irene Truitje Joseph	Indonesia	24.45	
10	1	Wan Kin Yee	Hong Kong	24.47	Q
11	3	Yumiko Sugawara	Japan	24.56	
12	1	Nguyen Thi Tinh	Vietnam	24.58	
13	1	Sakie Nobuoka	Japan	24.77	
14	1	Kim Dong-Hyun	South Korea	25.39	
15	3	Wirawan Ruamsuk	Thailand	25.50	
16	2	Shazia Yousef Khan	Pakistan	27.73	

=== Final ===
Wind: +0.7 m/s

Rank	Name	Nationality	Time	Notes
1st place, gold medalist(s)	Damayanthi Dharsha	Sri Lanka	22.84	CR
2nd place, silver medalist(s)	Lyubov Perepelova	Uzbekistan	23.30	
3rd place, bronze medalist(s)	Vinita Tripathi	India	23.39	
4	Yan Jiankui	China	23.64	
5	Chen Yueqin	China	23.87	
6	Wan Kin Yee	Hong Kong	24.29	
7	Alyona Petrova	Turkmenistan	24.32	NR
	Rachita Mistry	India	DQ	
