= Athletics at the 1998 Asian Games – Women's 4 × 400 metres relay =

Women's 4 × 400 metres relay at the 1998 Asian Games
- Venue: Thammasat Stadium
- Dates: 19 December 1998
- Competitors: 24 from 6 nations

Medalists
gold medal	China; Zhang Hengyun, Zhang Henghua, Li Yulian, Chen Yuxiang
silver medal	India; K. M. Beenamol, Jyotirmoyee Sikdar, Rosa Kutty, Jincy Phillip
bronze medal	Kazakhstan; Natalya Torshina, Svetlana Badrankova, Svetlana Bodritskaya, Svetlana Kazanina

The women's 4 × 400 metres relay competition at the 1998 Asian Games in Bangkok, Thailand was held on 19 December at the Thammasat Stadium.

== Schedule ==
All times are Indochina Time (UTC+07:00)

Date	Time	Event
Saturday, 19 December 1998	16:00	Final

== Results ==
Rank	Team	Time	Notes
1st place, gold medalist(s)	China (CHN); Zhang Hengyun; Zhang Henghua; Li Yulian; Chen Yuxiang	3:32.03	
2nd place, silver medalist(s)	India (IND); K. M. Beenamol; Jyotirmoyee Sikdar; Rosa Kutty; Jincy Phillip	3:32.20	
3rd place, bronze medalist(s)	Kazakhstan (KAZ); Natalya Torshina; Svetlana Badrankova; Svetlana Bodritskaya; Svetlana Kazanina	3:37.16	
4	Japan (JPN); Mariko Miura; Sakie Nobuoka; Satomi Kasashima; Mitsuko Katayama	3:38.61	
5	Sri Lanka (SRI); Swarnamali Edirisinghe; Nimmi de Zoysa; Jayamini Ileperuma; Damayanthi Dharsha	3:40.05	
6	Thailand (THA); Nopporn Serbsoomthorn; Praphaphun Chinwong; Sayrung Conpang; Yoawaluk Nakdilok	3:43.45	
