= Athletics at the 2002 Asian Games – Women's 200 metres =

Women's 200 metres at the 2002 Asian Games
- Venue: Busan Asiad Main Stadium
- Dates: 9–10 October 2002
- Competitors: 15 from 11 nations

Medalists
gold medal	Saraswati Saha	India
silver medal	Ni Xiaoli	China
bronze medal	Viktoriya Kovyreva	Kazakhstan

The women's 200 metres competition at the 2002 Asian Games in Busan, South Korea was held on 9–10 October at the Busan Asiad Main Stadium.

== Schedule ==
All times are Korea Standard Time (UTC+09:00)

Date	Time	Event
Wednesday, 9 October 2002	15:50	1st round
Thursday, 10 October 2002	11:20	Final

== Records ==
Prior to this competition, the existing world, Asian and Games records were as follows.

World Record	Florence Griffith Joyner (USA)	21.34	Seoul, South Korea	29 September 1988
Asian Record	Li Xuemei (CHN)	22.01	Shanghai, China	22 October 1997
Games Record	Damayanthi Dharsha (SRI)	22.48	Bangkok, Thailand	18 December 1998

== Results ==
Legend

- DNS — Did not start

=== 1st round ===
- Qualification: First 3 in each heat (Q) and the next 2 fastest (q) advance to the final.

==== Heat 1 ====
- Wind: −0.2 m/s

Rank	Athlete	Time	Notes
1	Viktoriya Kovyreva (KAZ)	23.58	Q
2	Susanthika Jayasinghe (SRI)	23.59	Q
3	Guzel Khubbieva (UZB)	23.81	Q
4	Motoka Arai (JPN)	23.81	q
5	Vinita Tripathi (IND)	23.94	q
6	Yan Jiankui (CHN)	23.96	
7	Kim Dong-hyun (KOR)	25.22	
8	Shamsunnahar Chumki (BAN)	25.73	

==== Heat 2 ====
- Wind: +0.3 m/s

Rank	Athlete	Time	Notes
1	Saraswati Saha (IND)	23.51	Q
2	Ni Xiaoli (CHN)	23.61	Q
3	Lyubov Perepelova (UZB)	23.65	Q
4	Chen Shu-chuan (TPE)	24.29	
5	Ayumi Suzuki (JPN)	24.73	
6	Wan Kin Yee (HKG)	25.37	
7	Gretta Taslakian (LIB)	25.47	

=== Final ===
- Wind: −0.2 m/s

Rank	Athlete	Time	Notes
1st place, gold medalist(s)	Saraswati Saha (IND)	23.28	
2nd place, silver medalist(s)	Ni Xiaoli (CHN)	23.34	
3rd place, bronze medalist(s)	Viktoriya Kovyreva (KAZ)	23.48	
4	Lyubov Perepelova (UZB)	23.52	
5	Guzel Khubbieva (UZB)	23.68	
6	Motoka Arai (JPN)	23.91	
7	Vinita Tripathi (IND)	23.92	
—	Susanthika Jayasinghe (SRI)	DNS	
