= India at the 1998 Asian Games =

- IOC code: IND
- NOC: Indian Olympic Association

in Bangkok
- Medals Ranked 9th: Gold 7 Silver 11 Bronze 17 Total 35

Asian Games appearances (overview)
- 1951; 1954; 1958; 1962; 1966; 1970; 1974; 1978; 1982; 1986; 1990; 1994; 1998; 2002; 2006; 2010; 2014; 2018; 2022; 2026

India competed at the 1998 Asian Games held in Bangkok, Thailand. India ranked 9th with 7 Gold medals, 11 Silver medals and 17 Bronze medals.

== Medals by sport ==
Sport	Gold	Silver	Bronze	Total
Athletics	2	6	7	15
Cue Sports	2	1	1	4
Boxing	1	0	1	2
Equestrian	0	0	1	1
Hockey	1	1	0	2
Kabaddi	1	0	0	1
Rowing	0	0	2	2
Shooting	0	2	1	3
Tennis	0	0	4	4
Weightlifting	0	1	0	1
Total	7	11	17	35

== Medalists ==
=== Gold (7) ===
Medal	Sportsperson	Games	Event
1st place, gold medalist(s)	Jyotirmoy Sikdhar	Athletics	1500 m
1st place, gold medalist(s)	Jyotirmoy Sikdhar	Athletics	800 m
1st place, gold medalist(s)	Geet Sethi and Ashok Shandilya	Billiards	Doubles
1st place, gold medalist(s)	Ashok Shandilya	Billiards	Singles
1st place, gold medalist(s)	Ngangom Dingko Singh	Boxing	54 kg
1st place, gold medalist(s)	Hockey team	Hockey	Men
1st place, gold medalist(s)	Kabaddi team	Kabaddi	Men

=== Silver (11) ===
Medal	Sportsperson	Games	Event
2nd place, silver medalist(s)	Anil Kumar	Athletics	Shot Put
2nd place, silver medalist(s)	Shakti Singh	Athletics	Discus Throw
2nd place, silver medalist(s)	Rosa Kutty	Athletics	800M Race
2nd place, silver medalist(s)	Sunita Rani	Athletics	5000M Race
2nd place, silver medalist(s)	Lijo David, P. Ramachandra, Jata Shankar,ParamJeet Singh	Athletics	Men's 4*400M Relay
2nd place, silver medalist(s)	Jincy Philit, Jyotimoyee Sikadar, Rosa Kutty, K.M Beenamol	Athletics	Women's 4*400M Relay

=== Bronze (17) ===
Tennis (4 Bronze Medals)-Mahesh Bhupathi (Men's Singles, Men's Team, and Mixed Doubles)Srinath Prahlad (Men's Singles and Men's Team)Syed Fazaluddin (Men's Team)Nitin Kirtane (Men's Team)Nirupama Vaidyanathan (Mixed Doubles)

Rowing (2 Bronze Medals)-Men's Coxless Four Team: Birbal Singh, Jagjit Singh, Johnson Xavier, and Tarlochan SinghMen's Lightweight Coxless Four Team: Binu Kurien, Kasam Khan, Pappi Singh, and Rampal Singh

Shooting (1 Bronze Medal)-Men's 25M Center Fire Pistol Team: Ashok Pandit, Ved Prakash Pilaniya, and Jaspal Rana

Athletics (7 Bronze Medals)-Sunita Rani (Women's 1500m)Gulab Chand (Men's 10,000m)Bahadur Prasad (Men's 1500m)Anil Kumar (Men's Discus Throw)Shakti Singh (Men's Shot Put)Gurmeet Kaur (Women's Javelin Throw)Rachita Mistry (Women's 100m)

Boxing: Gurcharan Singh (Men's Light Heavyweight - 81 kg)

Cue Sports: Ashok Shandilya / Geet Sethi or cue sports discipline Equestrian: Individual/Team event bronze

== Athletics ==
=== Men ===
Track & road events

Athletes	Event	Heats		Semifinal		Final	
Athletes	Event	Result	Rank	Result	Rank	Result	Rank
Paramjit Singh	400 m	46.68	1 Q	46.37	2 Q	45.93	3rd place, bronze medalist(s)
Bahadur Prasad	1500 m	3:51.00	3 Q	—N/a		3:41.58	3rd place, bronze medalist(s)
Bahadur Prasad	5000 m	—N/a				14:48.85	8
Gulab Chand	5000 m	—N/a				13:59.20	4
Gulab Chand	10000 m	—N/a				29:10.53	3rd place, bronze medalist(s)
Lijo David Thottan; Purukottam Ramachandran; Paramjit Singh; Jata Shankar	4 × 400 m relay	3:04.86	2 Q	—N/a		3:02.62 SB	2nd place, silver medalist(s)

Field events

Athletes	Event	Final	
Athletes	Event	Result	Rank
Anil Kumar	Discus Throw	58.43	2nd place, silver medalist(s)
Ajit Bhaduria	Discus Throw	54.03	6
Shakti Singh	Shot Put	18.81	2nd place, silver medalist(s)
Bahadur Singh Sagoo	Shot Put	18.21	4
Satbir Singh	Javelin Throw	75.21	6
Jagdish Bishnoi	Javelin Throw	72.03	8

=== Women ===
Track & road events

Athletes	Event	Heats		Semifinal		Final	
Athletes	Event	Result	Rank	Result	Rank	Result	Rank
Rachita Mistry	100 m	11.46	2Q	—N/a		11.41	3rd place, bronze medalist(s)
P.T. Usha	200 m	24.27	4	did not advance			
P.T. Usha	400 m	54.63	4 Q	—N/a		54.37	6
Rosa Kutty	400 m	54.06	1 Q	—N/a		54.55	4
Rosa Kutty	800 m	2.05.77	1 Q	—N/a		2.03.00	2nd place, silver medalist(s)
Jyotirmoyee Sikdar	800 m	2:07.41	1 Q	—N/a		2.01.00	1st place, gold medalist(s)
Jyotirmoyee Sikdar	1500 m	—N/a				4:12.81	1st place, gold medalist(s)
Sunita Rani	1500 m	—N/a				4:13.66	3rd place, bronze medalist(s)
Sunita Rani	5000 m	—N/a				15:54.47	2nd place, silver medalist(s)
Rachita Mistry; P.T. Usha; Valdivel Jayalakshmi; E.B. Shyla	4 × 100 m Relay	—N/a				44.77	4
Jincy Phillip; Jyotirmoyee Sikdar; Rosa Kutty; K.M. Beenamol	4 × 400 m Relay	—N/a				3:32.20	2nd place, silver medalist(s)

Field events

Athletes	Event	Final	
Athletes	Event	Result	Rank
Neelam Jaswant Singh	Discus Throw	55.09	3rd place, bronze medalist(s)
Swarnjeet Kaur	Discus Throw	51.46	4
Gurmeet Kaur	Javelin Throw	59.00	3rd place, bronze medalist(s)
Lekha Thomas	Triple Jump	13.05	9

== Medal tally ==
Rank	NOC	Gold	Silver	Bronze	Total
9	India	7	11	17	35

== Football ==
=== Men ===
==== Team ====
Coach: Syed Nayeemuddin

No.	Pos.	Player	Date of birth (age)	Club
1	GK	Juje Siddi	15 January 1973 (aged 25)	(All India Football Federation) Salgaocar
2	DF	K. V. Dhanesh	13 February 1973 (aged 25)	(All India Football Federation) Kochin
3	DF	Franky Barreto		(All India Football Federation) East Bengal
4	DF	Roberto Fernandez	2 November 1971 (aged 27)	(All India Football Federation) Salgaocar
5	DF	Jiju Jacob	25 December 1967 (aged 30)	(All India Football Federation) State Bank of Travancore
6	MF	Shanmugam Venkatesh	21 November 1978 (aged 20)	(All India Football Federation) Salgaocar
7	MF	Basudeb Mondal	6 July 1974 (aged 24)	(All India Football Federation) East Bengal
8	FW	Syed Sabir Pasha	5 November 1972 (aged 26)	(All India Football Federation) Indian Bank
9	FW	Raman Vijayan	4 June 1973 (aged 25)	(All India Football Federation) East Bengal
10	FW	I. M. Vijayan	25 April 1969 (aged 29)	(All India Football Federation) Mohun Bagan
11	MF	Jo Paul Ancheri	2 August 1975 (aged 23)	(All India Football Federation) Mohun Bagan
12	MF	Debjit Ghosh	23 February 1974 (aged 24)	(All India Football Federation) Mohun Bagan
13	GK	Feroz Sherif	22 May 1971 (aged 27)	(All India Football Federation) State Bank of Travancore
14	MF	Carlton Chapman	13 April 1971 (aged 27)	(All India Football Federation) East Bengal
15	FW	Bhaichung Bhutia	15 December 1976 (aged 21)	(All India Football Federation) East Bengal
16	DF	Anit Ghosh	24 March 1977 (aged 21)	(All India Football Federation) East Bengal
17	FW	Abdul Khalique		(All India Football Federation) Bengal Mumbai
18	MF	Tushar Rakshit	4 February 1968 (aged 30)	(All India Football Federation) East Bengal
19	MF	Shamsi Reza		(All India Football Federation) Mahindra & Mahindra
21	GK	Hemanta Dora	4 December 1973 (aged 25)	(All India Football Federation) Mohun Bagan

==== Preliminary round ====
Pos	Team	Pld	W	D	L	GF	GA	GD	Pts
1	Japan	2	2	0	0	6	0	+6	6
2	India	2	1	0	1	1	1	0	3
3	Nepal	2	0	0	2	0	6	−6	0

Source: RSSSF
3 December
15:30

Japan	1–0	India
Fukuda 55'

Trang Stadium, Trang

5 December
15:30

India	1–0	Nepal
Chapman 46'

Trang Stadium, Trang

==== Second round ====
Pos	Team	Pld	W	D	L	GF	GA	GD	Pts
1	Uzbekistan	3	2	1	0	7	1	+6	7
2	Turkmenistan	3	1	2	0	5	4	+1	5
3	North Korea	3	1	1	1	3	5	−2	4
4	India	3	0	0	3	2	7	−5	0

Source: RSSSF
7 December
15:00

Turkmenistan	3–2	India
Neželew 39'; Agaýew 49'; Kislow 74'		Vijayan 83'; Rakshit 87'

Supachalasai Stadium, Bangkok

9 December
17:00

India	0–2	Uzbekistan
		Shkvyrin 35'; Rahmonqulov 49'

Supachalasai Stadium, Bangkok

11 December
15:00

India	0–2	North Korea
		So Min-chol 11'; Ju Song-il 73'

Supachalasai Stadium, Bangkok

=== Women ===
Coach: S. Arumainayagam

No.	Pos.	Player	Date of birth (age)	Club
	MF	Bentla D'Coth	29 May 1969 (aged 29)	
	GK	Binshori Devi		
	DF	Chaitali Devi		
	DF	Chaoba Devi		
	DF	Khambi Devi		
	DF	Kumari Devi		
	FW	Lokeshwari Devi		
	MF	Oinam Bembem Devi	1 March 1980 (aged 18)	
	GK	Rabita Devi		
	FW	S. Rani Devi		
	FW	Tababi Devi		
	DF	Ezhilarasi		
	FW	Sujata Kar		
	FW	Gurmeet Kaur		
	MF	Gracye Pereira		
	DF	Maria Rebello		
	MF	Sradhanjali Samantaray	20 June 1978 (aged 20)	
	MF	Alpana Sil		

==== Preliminary round ====
Pos	Team	Pld	W	D	L	GF	GA	GD	Pts
1	China	3	3	0	0	24	0	+24	9
2	Chinese Taipei	3	1	1	1	14	7	+7	4
3	South Korea	3	1	1	1	8	4	+4	4
4	India	3	0	0	3	1	36	−35	0

Source: RSSSF
7 December
14:00

India	0–7	South Korea
	Report	Seong Mi Son; Sung Mi Cha; Maria Rebello (o.g.); Mi Yeon Lee

Thammasat Stadium, Pathum Thani

9 December
16:00

India	1–13	Chinese Taipei
Tababi Devi	Report	Ming-shu Lee; Ii-Min Hung; Huey-Shwu Wu; Chun- Lan Huang; Tzu-Yun Chang; Lan-ten Lan

Thammasat Stadium, Pathum Thani

11 December
14:00

India	0–16	China

Thai-Japanese Stadium, Bangkok
