= Athletics at the 1998 Asian Games – Women's 200 metres =

Athletics event

Women's 200 metres at the 1998 Asian Games
- Venue: Thammasat Stadium
- Dates: 17–18 December 1998
- Competitors: 14 from 11 nations

Medalists
gold medal	Damayanthi Dharsha	Sri Lanka
silver medal	Li Xuemei	China
bronze medal	Yan Jiankui	China

The women's 200 metres competition at the 1998 Asian Games in Bangkok, Thailand was held on 17–18 December at the Thammasat Stadium.

== Schedule ==
All times are Indochina Time (UTC+07:00)

Date	Time	Event
Thursday, 17 December 1998	14:20	Heats
Friday, 18 December 1998	15:30	Final

== Results ==
=== Heats ===
- Qualification: First 3 in each heat (Q) and the next 2 fastest (q) advance to the final.

==== Heat 1 ====
- Wind: +1.2 m/s

Rank	Athlete	Time	Notes
1	Damayanthi Dharsha (SRI)	23.16	Q, GR
2	Li Xuemei (CHN)	23.35	Q
3	Lyubov Perepelova (UZB)	23.71	Q
4	Chen Shu-chuan (TPE)	24.06	q
5	Sakie Nobuoka (JPN)	24.07	q
6	Supavadee Khawpeag (THA)	24.20	
7	Reine Bejjani (LIB)	26.84	

==== Heat 2 ====
- Wind: +1.9 m/s

Rank	Athlete	Time	Notes
1	Motoka Arai (JPN)	23.54	Q
2	Shanti Govindasamy (MAS)	23.56	Q
3	Yan Jiankui (CHN)	23.57	Q
4	P. T. Usha (IND)	24.27	
5	Wan Kin Yee (HKG)	24.38	
6	Savitree Srichure (THA)	24.53	
7	Hoàng Thị Lan Anh (VIE)	24.78	

=== Final ===
- Wind: +0.1 m/s

Rank	Athlete	Time	Notes
1st place, gold medalist(s)	Damayanthi Dharsha (SRI)	22.48	GR
2nd place, silver medalist(s)	Li Xuemei (CHN)	22.53	
3rd place, bronze medalist(s)	Yan Jiankui (CHN)	23.15	
4	Shanti Govindasamy (MAS)	23.42	
5	Lyubov Perepelova (UZB)	23.57	
6	Motoka Arai (JPN)	23.58	
7	Chen Shu-chuan (TPE)	23.96	
8	Sakie Nobuoka (JPN)	24.48	
