= 2000 Asian Athletics Championships – Women's 100 metres =

The women's 100 metres event at the 2000 Asian Athletics Championships was held in Jakarta, Indonesia on 28–30 August.

== Medalists ==
Gold	Silver	Bronze
Lyubov Perepelova; Uzbekistan	Saraswati Dey; India	Rachita Mistry; India

== Results ==
=== Heats ===
Wind:
Heat 1: +0.3 m/s, Heat 2: +0.3 m/s, Heat 3: -0.7 m/s

Rank	Heat	Name	Nationality	Time	Notes
1	1	Lyubov Perepelova	Uzbekistan	11.40	Q
2	1	Saraswati Dey	India	11.51	Q
3	2	Rachita Mistry	India	11.52	Q
4	2	Yan Jiankui	China	11.63	Q
5	3	Viktoriya Koviyreva	Kazakhstan	11.66	Q
6	1	Chen Jueqin	China	11.74	q
7	1	Motoka Arai	Japan	11.82	q
7	2	Irene Truitje Joseph	Indonesia	11.82	
7	2	Natalya Vorobyova	Kazakhstan	11.82	
7	3	Kaori Sakagami	Japan	11.82	Q
11	1	Orranut Klomdee	Thailand	12.00	
12	3	Wan Kin Yee	Hong Kong	12.04	
13	3	Sih Hernawati	Indonesia	12.23	
14	1	Supiati	Indonesia	12.26	
15	3	Nattaporn Wongtipart	Thailand	12.33	
16	2	Alinawati Ali Akbar	Brunei	12.58	
17	2	Shazia Yousef Khan	Pakistan	12.98	
18	3	Bina Shrestha	Nepal	13.42	

=== Final ===
Wind: +1.0 m/s

Rank	Name	Nationality	Time	Notes
1st place, gold medalist(s)	Lyubov Perepelova	Uzbekistan	11.31	
2nd place, silver medalist(s)	Saraswati Dey	India	11.40	
3rd place, bronze medalist(s)	Rachita Mistry	India	11.46	
4	Viktoriya Koviyreva	Kazakhstan	11.57	
5	Yan Jiankui	China	11.59	
6	Chen Jueqin	China	11.62	
7	Motoka Arai	Japan	11.78	
8	Kaori Sakagami	Japan	11.83	
