= Athletics at the 1998 Asian Games – Women's 100 metres =

Women's 100 metres at the 1998 Asian Games
- Venue: Thammasat Stadium
- Dates: 13–14 December 1998
- Competitors: 18 from 12 nations

Medalists
gold medal	Li Xuemei	China
silver medal	Li Yali	China
bronze medal	Rachita Mistry	India

The women's 100 metres competition at the 1998 Asian Games in Bangkok, Thailand was held on 13–14 December at the Thammasat Stadium.

== Schedule ==
All times are Indochina Time (UTC+07:00)

Date	Time	Event
Sunday, 13 December 1998	14:00	Heats
Monday, 14 December 1998	15:55	Final

== Results ==
Legend

- DNF — Did not finish
- DNS — Did not start

=== Heats ===
- Qualification: First 2 in each heat (Q) and the next 2 fastest (q) advance to the final.

==== Heat 1 ====
- Wind: +2.7 m/s

Rank	Athlete	Time	Notes
1	Li Xuemei (CHN)	10.99	Q
2	Motoka Arai (JPN)	11.46	Q
3	Shanti Govindasamy (MAS)	11.47	q
4	Wan Kin Yee (HKG)	11.78	
5	Hoàng Thị Lan Anh (VIE)	11.83	
—	Nathalie Saikaly (LIB)	DNF	

==== Heat 2 ====
- Wind: +0.8 m/s

Rank	Athlete	Time	Notes
1	Li Yali (CHN)	11.45	Q
2	Lyudmila Dmitriadi (UZB)	11.53	Q
3	Supavadee Khawpeag (THA)	11.65	q
4	Tomomi Kaneko (JPN)	11.73	
5	Chen Shu-chuan (TPE)	11.94	
6	Reine Bejjani (LIB)	13.13	

==== Heat 3 ====
- Wind: +1.5 m/s

Rank	Athlete	Time	Notes
1	Susanthika Jayasinghe (SRI)	11.30	Q
2	Rachita Mistry (IND)	11.46	Q
3	Guzel Khubbieva (UZB)	11.65	q
4	Naparat Suajongprue (THA)	11.86	
5	Phetsamone Paseuthxay (LAO)	13.04	
6	Chan Sau Ying (HKG)	17.92	

=== Final ===
- Wind: +2.3 m/s

Rank	Athlete	Time	Notes
1st place, gold medalist(s)	Li Xuemei (CHN)	11.05	
2nd place, silver medalist(s)	Li Yali (CHN)	11.36	
3rd place, bronze medalist(s)	Rachita Mistry (IND)	11.41	
4	Shanti Govindasamy (MAS)	11.41	
5	Motoka Arai (JPN)	11.59	
6	Guzel Khubbieva (UZB)	11.59	
7	Supavadee Khawpeag (THA)	11.62	
8	Lyudmila Dmitriadi (UZB)	11.63	
—	Susanthika Jayasinghe (SRI)	DNS	
