= 2000 Asian Athletics Championships – Women's 400 metres =

The women's 400 metres event at the 2000 Asian Athletics Championships was held in Jakarta, Indonesia, on 28–30 August.

== Medalists ==
Gold	Silver	Bronze
Damayanthi Dharsha; Sri Lanka	K. M. Beenamol; India	Chen Yuxiang; China

== Results ==
=== Heats ===
Rank	Heat	Name	Nationality	Time	Notes
1	1	Damayanthi Dharsha	Sri Lanka	51.87	Q
2	2	K. M. Beenamol	India	52.79	Q
3	1	Oksana Luneva	Kyrgyzstan	53.56	Q
4	2	Chen Yuxiang	China	53.60	Q
5	1	Paramjeet Kaur	India	53.75	Q
6	2	Kazue Kakinuma	Japan	54.44	Q
7	1	Yelena Piskunova	Uzbekistan	55.14	q
8	2	Alyona Petrova	Turkmenistan	55.42	q
9	1	Miho Sugimori	Japan	55.51	
10	1	Jeon Mi-Young	South Korea	57.65	
11	2	Kim Dong-Hyun	South Korea	57.92	
12	1	Raquel Perera Soselisa	Indonesia	59.87	
13	2	Beauty Nazmun Nahar	Bangladesh	60.75	
14	2	Yaznee Nasheeda	Maldives	62.43	NR

=== Final ===
Rank	Name	Nationality	Time	Notes
1st place, gold medalist(s)	Damayanthi Dharsha	Sri Lanka	51.05	CR, NR
2nd place, silver medalist(s)	K. M. Beenamol	India	51.41	
3rd place, bronze medalist(s)	Chen Yuxiang	China	52.81	
4	Paramjeet Kaur	India	53.08	
5	Oksana Luneva	Kyrgyzstan	53.93	
6	Kazue Kakinuma	Japan	54.05	
7	Alyona Petrova	Turkmenistan	54.40	
8	Yelena Piskunova	Uzbekistan	54.96	
