= Athletics at the 1998 Asian Games – Women's 800 metres =

Women's 800 metres at the 1998 Asian Games
- Venue: Thammasat Stadium
- Dates: 15–17 December 1998
- Competitors: 11 from 8 nations

Medalists
| gold medal | Jyotirmoyee Sikdar | India |
| silver medal | Rosa Kutty | India |
| bronze medal | Wang Yuanping | China |

The women's 800 metres competition at the 1998 Asian Games in Bangkok, Thailand was held on 15–17 December at the Thammasat Stadium.

== Schedule ==
All times are Indochina Time (UTC+07:00)

| Date | Time | Event |
|---|---|---|
| Tuesday, 15 December 1998 | 15:50 | Heats |
| Thursday, 17 December 1998 | 16:20 | Final |

== Results ==
=== Heats ===
- Qualification: First 3 in each heat (Q) and the next 2 fastest (q) advance to the final.

==== Heat 1 ====
| Rank | Athlete | Time | Notes |
|---|---|---|---|
| 1 | Ryoko Takezawa (JPN) | 2:04.35 | Q |
| 2 | Wang Yuanping (CHN) | 2:05.21 | Q |
| 3 | Rosa Kutty (IND) | 2:05.77 | Q |
| 4 | Chuang Ko-hsin (TPE) | 2:07.54 | q |
| 5 | Praphaphun Chinwong (THA) | 2:10.07 | q |

==== Heat 2 ====
| Rank | Athlete | Time | Notes |
|---|---|---|---|
| 1 | Jyotirmoyee Sikdar (IND) | 2:07.41 | Q |
| 2 | Lee Ya-hui (TPE) | 2:08.78 | Q |
| 3 | Saipin Patjun (THA) | 2:10.15 | Q |
| 4 | Phạm Đình Khánh Đoan (VIE) | 2:10.70 | |
| 5 | Yaznee Nasheeda (MDV) | 2:31.50 | |
| 6 | Myadagmaagiin Otgontuyaa (MGL) | 2:36.54 | |

=== Final ===
| Rank | Athlete | Time | Notes |
|---|---|---|---|
| 1st place, gold medalist(s) | Jyotirmoyee Sikdar (IND) | 2:01.00 | |
| 2nd place, silver medalist(s) | Rosa Kutty (IND) | 2:03.34 | |
| 3rd place, bronze medalist(s) | Wang Yuanping (CHN) | 2:04.45 | |
| 4 | Lee Ya-hui (TPE) | 2:04.77 | |
| 5 | Ryoko Takezawa (JPN) | 2:05.00 | |
| 6 | Chuang Ko-hsin (TPE) | 2:06.85 | |
| 7 | Saipin Patjun (THA) | 2:09.86 | |
| 8 | Praphaphun Chinwong (THA) | 2:10.01 | |
