= Athletics at the 1998 Asian Games – Women's 400 metres =

Women's 400 metres at the 1998 Asian Games
- Venue: Thammasat Stadium
- Dates: 13–14 December 1998
- Competitors: 14 from 8 nations

Medalists
gold medal	Damayanthi Dharsha	Sri Lanka
silver medal	Chen Yuxiang	China
bronze medal	Svetlana Bodritskaya	Kazakhstan

The women's 400 metres competition at the 1998 Asian Games in Bangkok, Thailand was held on 13–14 December at the Thammasat Stadium.

== Schedule ==
All times are Indochina Time (UTC+07:00)

Date	Time	Event
Sunday, 13 December 1998	15:00	Heats
Monday, 14 December 1998	14:30	Final

== Results ==
=== Heats ===
- Qualification: First 3 in each heat (Q) and the next 2 fastest (q) advance to the final.

==== Heat 1 ====
Rank	Athlete	Time	Notes
1	Rosa Kutty (IND)	54.06	Q
2	Chen Yuxiang (CHN)	54.13	Q
3	Svetlana Badrankova (KAZ)	54.59	Q
4	Satomi Kasashima (JPN)	54.94	q
5	Nimmi de Zoysa (SRI)	55.22	
6	Yoawaluk Nakdilok (THA)	56.93	
7	Dalivanh Detthongthip (LAO)	1:01.90	

==== Heat 2 ====
Rank	Athlete	Time	Notes
1	Damayanthi Dharsha (SRI)	52.48	Q
2	Svetlana Bodritskaya (KAZ)	53.47	Q
3	Zhang Hengyun (CHN)	54.37	Q
4	P. T. Usha (IND)	54.63	q
5	Mitsuko Katayama (JPN)	55.16	
6	Lee Ya-hui (TPE)	55.62	
7	Sayrung Conpang (THA)	56.52	

=== Final ===
Rank	Athlete	Time	Notes
1st place, gold medalist(s)	Damayanthi Dharsha (SRI)	51.57	
2nd place, silver medalist(s)	Chen Yuxiang (CHN)	52.50	
3rd place, bronze medalist(s)	Svetlana Bodritskaya (KAZ)	53.00	
4	Rosa Kutty (IND)	53.55	
5	Zhang Hengyun (CHN)	53.92	
6	P. T. Usha (IND)	54.37	
7	Svetlana Badrankova (KAZ)	54.63	
8	Satomi Kasashima (JPN)	55.20	
