= Athletics at the 2002 Asian Games – Women's 400 metres =

Women's 400 metres at the 2002 Asian Games
- Venue: Busan Asiad Main Stadium
- Dates: 8–10 October 2002
- Competitors: 16 from 10 nations

Medalists
gold medal	Damayanthi Dharsha	Sri Lanka
silver medal	K. M. Beenamol	India
bronze medal	Svetlana Bodritskaya	Kazakhstan

The women's 400 metres competition at the 2002 Asian Games in Busan, South Korea was held on 8–10 October at the Busan Asiad Main Stadium.

== Schedule ==
All times are Korea Standard Time (UTC+09:00)

Date	Time	Event
Tuesday, 8 October 2002	10:30	1st round
Thursday, 10 October 2002	15:30	Final

== Records ==
Prior to this competition, the existing world, Asian and Games records were as follows.

World Record	Marita Koch (GDR)	47.60	Canberra, Australia	6 October 1985
Asian Record	Ma Yuqin (CHN)	49.81	Beijing, China	11 September 1993
Games Record	Ma Yuqin (CHN)	51.17	Hiroshima, Japan	14 October 1994

== Results ==
Legend

- DNF — Did not finish
- DNS — Did not start

=== 1st round ===
- Qualification: First 3 in each heat (Q) and the next 2 fastest (q) advance to the final.

==== Heat 1 ====
Rank	Athlete	Time	Notes
1	Chen Yuxiang (CHN)	53.84	Q
2	Jincy Phillip (IND)	53.88	Q
3	Alýona Petrowa (TKM)	54.09	Q
4	Tatyana Roslanova (KAZ)	54.60	q
5	Mayu Kida (JPN)	54.71	q
6	Kim Dong-hyun (KOR)	55.73	
7	Saowalee Kaewchuay (THA)	56.16	
8	Gretta Taslakian (LIB)	56.43	

==== Heat 2 ====
Rank	Athlete	Time	Notes
1	Damayanthi Dharsha (SRI)	52.25	Q
2	Svetlana Bodritskaya (KAZ)	52.95	Q
3	K. M. Beenamol (IND)	53.21	Q
4	Kazue Kakinuma (JPN)	55.35	
5	Hou Jingmei (CHN)	55.92	
6	Park Jong-kyong (KOR)	57.47	
7	Saipin Kaewsorn (THA)	58.00	
—	Nguyễn Bích Vân (VIE)	DNS	

=== Final ===
Rank	Athlete	Time	Notes
1st place, gold medalist(s)	Damayanthi Dharsha (SRI)	51.13	GR
2nd place, silver medalist(s)	K. M. Beenamol (IND)	52.04	
3rd place, bronze medalist(s)	Svetlana Bodritskaya (KAZ)	52.10	
4	Jincy Phillip (IND)	53.13	
5	Chen Yuxiang (CHN)	54.11	
6	Mayu Kida (JPN)	54.13	
7	Tatyana Roslanova (KAZ)	54.44	
—	Alýona Petrowa (TKM)	DNF	
