= 2000 Asian Athletics Championships – Women's 4 × 400 metres relay =

The women's 4 × 400 metres relay event at the 2000 Asian Athletics Championships was held in Jakarta, Indonesia on 31 August.

== Results ==
Rank	Team	Name	Time	Notes
1st place, gold medalist(s)	India	Paramjeet Kaur, Jincy Phillip, Rosa Kutty, K. M. Beenamol	3:31.54	CR
2nd place, silver medalist(s)	Japan	Miho Sugimori, Kazue Kakinuma, Sakie Nobuoka, Makiko Yoshida	3:37.15	
3rd place, bronze medalist(s)	South Korea	Kim Sun-Young, Jeon Mi-Young, Kim Su-Kyong, Kim Dong-Hyun	3:48.29	
