= 2003 Asian Athletics Championships – Women's 400 metres =

The women's 400 metres event at the 2003 Asian Athletics Championships was held in Manila, Philippines on September 20–21.

== Medalists ==
Gold	Silver	Bronze
Yin Yin Khine; Myanmar	Bu Fanfang; China	Svetlana Bodritskaya; Kazakhstan

== Results ==
=== Heats ===
Rank	Heat	Name	Nationality	Time	Notes
1	3	Yin Yin Khine	Myanmar	53.32	Q
2	3	Oksana Luneva	Kyrgyzstan	53.65	Q
3	3	Svetlana Bodritskaya	Kazakhstan	53.73	q
4	2	Zhang Xiaoyuan	China	54.34	Q
5	1	Bu Fanfang	China	54.60	Q
6	1	Mayu Sato	Japan	54.71	Q
7	2	Menike Wickramasinghe	Sri Lanka	54.72	Q
8	1	Saowalee Kaewchuy	Thailand	54.82	q
9	2	Olga Tereshkova	Kazakhstan	55.09	
10	3	Mayumi Yuno	Japan	55.18	
11	3	Lee Yun-Kyong	South Korea	55.31	
12	2	Zamira Amirova	Uzbekistan	55.65	SB
13	3	Satti Geetha	India	55.80	
14	3	Saipin Kaewsorn	Thailand	56.76	SB
15	2	Mary Grace Melgar	Philippines	56.87	SB
16	1	Badmaa Batkhuu	Mongolia	1:01.91	NJR
17	1	Julie Rose Forbes	Philippines	1:02.40	PB
	2	Sagardeep Kaur	India	DNF	
	1	Damayanthi Dharsha	Sri Lanka	DNS	
	2	Amanda Teo Bao Ling	Singapore	DNS	

=== Final ===
Rank	Name	Nationality	Time	Notes
1st place, gold medalist(s)	Yin Yin Khine	Myanmar	52.96	NR
2nd place, silver medalist(s)	Bu Fanfang	China	52.97	
3rd place, bronze medalist(s)	Svetlana Bodritskaya	Kazakhstan	53.19	
4	Oksana Luneva	Kyrgyzstan	53.24	SB
5	Zhang Xiaoyuan	China	54.19	
6	Saowalee Kaewchuy	Thailand	54.35	PB
7	Mayu Sato	Japan	54.75	
8	Menike Wickramasinghe	Sri Lanka	54.96	
