= Kazuhiro Takahashi =

Kazuhiro Takahashi may refer to:

- Kazuhiro Takahashi (sledge hockey)
- Kazuhiro Takahashi (sprinter)
