= Athletics at the 2002 Asian Games – Women's 4 × 400 metres relay =

Women's 4 × 400 metres relay at the 2002 Asian Games
- Venue: Busan Asiad Main Stadium
- Dates: 13 October 2002
- Competitors: 24 from 6 nations

Medalists
gold medal	India; Jincy Phillip, Manjeet Kaur, Soma Biswas, K. M. Beenamol
silver medal	Kazakhstan; Tatyana Roslanova, Natalya Torshina, Olga Tereshkova, Svetlana Bodritskaya
bronze medal	China; Qin Wangping, Bo Fanfang, Hou Xiufen, Chen Yuxiang

The women's 4 × 400 metres relay competition at the 2002 Asian Games in Busan, South Korea was held on 13 October at the Busan Asiad Main Stadium.

== Schedule ==
All times are Korea Standard Time (UTC+09:00)

Date	Time	Event
Sunday, 13 October 2002	10:40	Final

== Records ==
Prior to this competition, the existing world, Asian and Games records were as follows.

World Record	Soviet Union	3:15.17	Seoul, South Korea	1 October 1988
Asian Record	China	3:24.28	Beijing, China	13 September 1993
Games Record	China	3:29.11	Hiroshima, Japan	16 October 1994

== Results ==
Rank	Team	Time	Notes
1st place, gold medalist(s)	India (IND); Jincy Phillip; Manjeet Kaur; Soma Biswas; K. M. Beenamol	3:30.84	
2nd place, silver medalist(s)	Kazakhstan (KAZ); Tatyana Roslanova; Natalya Torshina; Olga Tereshkova; Svetlana Bodritskaya	3:31.72	
3rd place, bronze medalist(s)	China (CHN); Qin Wangping; Bo Fanfang; Hou Xiufen; Chen Yuxiang	3:32.43	
4	Japan (JPN); Miho Sugimori; Kazue Kakinuma; Mayu Kida; Makiko Yoshida	3:33.23	
5	Thailand (THA); Suwannee Kumsa; Orranut Klomdee; Saowalee Kaewchuay; Wassana Winatho	3:40.13	
6	South Korea (KOR); Kim Dong-hyun; Lee Yun-kyong; Park Jong-kyong; Choi Hae-nam	3:42.27	
