= 2000 Asian Athletics Championships – Women's 800 metres =

The women's 800 metres event at the 2000 Asian Athletics Championships was held in Jakarta, Indonesia on 31 August.

== Results ==
Rank	Name	Nationality	Time	Notes
1st place, gold medalist(s)	Lin Na	China	2:03.46	
2nd place, silver medalist(s)	Wang Yuanping	China	2:04.11	
3rd place, bronze medalist(s)	Rosa Kutty	India	2:04.97	
4	Makiko Yoshida	Japan	2:07.09	
5	Ester Sumah	Indonesia	2:07.13	
6	Geeta Manral	India	2:09.01	
7	Pham Dinh Khanh Doan	Vietnam	2:10.02	
8	Ok Tok Sun	North Korea	2:12.55	
9	Olivia Sadi	Indonesia	2:13.61	
10	Yaznee Nasheeda	Maldives	2:30.62	
