= Motoka Arai =

Japanese sprinter (born 1974)

Personal information
- Nationality: Japanese
- Born: 16 June 1974 (age 52) Kobe, Japan
- Education: Konan University
- Height: 1.57 m (5 ft 2 in)
- Weight: 50 kg (110 lb)

Sport
- Country: Japan
- Sport: Track and field
- Event: Sprints
- Retired: September 2008

Achievements and titles
- Personal best(s): 60 m: 7.54 (1999) 100 m: 11.39 (2004) 200 m: 23.46 (1999)
Medal record
Women's athletics
Representing Japan
Asian Championships
Silver medal – second place	1998 Fukuoka	4×100 m relay
Silver medal – second place	2003 Manila	4×100 m relay
East Asian Games
Silver medal – second place	1997 Busan	4×100 m relay
Silver medal – second place	1997 Busan	4×400 m relay
Silver medal – second place	2001 Osaka	4×100 m relay
Bronze medal – third place	1997 Busan	200 m

Motoka Arai (新井 初佳, Arai Motoka; born 16 June 1974 in Kobe) is a Japanese retired sprinter. She competed in the 4 × 100 metres relay at the 1997 World Championships, the 100 metres and 4 × 100 metres relay at the 1999 World Championships and the 4 × 100 metres relay at the 2003 World Championships. She was a seven-time national champion in the 100 metres and a six-time national champion in the 200 metres at the Japanese Championships. She is the former Japanese record holder in the 100 metres and 200 metres, and the current Japanese record holder in the indoor 200 metres.

She married Japanese sprinter Shigeyuki Kojima in February 2004. She changed her name to Motoka Kojima, but she reverted to her original name.

== Personal bests ==
Event	Time (s)	Competition	Venue	Date	Notes
60 m	7.54 (Indoor)	World Indoor Championships	Maebashi, Japan	7 March 1999	
100 m	11.39 (wind: +1.1 m/s)	National Championships	Tottori, Japan	4 June 2004	
100 m	11.31 (wind: +3.7 m/s)	National Championships	Tokyo, Japan	9 June 2001	Wind-assisted
200 m	23.46 (wind: 0.0 m/s)	National Sports Festival	Kumamoto, Japan	26 October 1999	Former NR
200 m	23.22 (wind: +2.2 m/s)	National Championships	Shizuoka, Japan	3 October 1999	Wind-assisted
200 m	24.11 (Indoor)	Japan-China Indoor Match	Yokohama, Japan	26 February 2000	Current NIR

== International competition ==
Year	Competition	Venue	Position	Event	Time
Representing Japan
1997	East Asian Games	Busan, South Korea	3rd	200 m	24.09 (wind: +3.4 m/s)
1997	East Asian Games	Busan, South Korea	2nd	4×100 m relay	45.16 (relay leg: 4th)
1997	East Asian Games	Busan, South Korea	2nd	4×400 m relay	3:36.60 (relay leg: 2nd)
1997	World Championships	Athens, Greece	15th (sf)	4×100 m relay	44.56 (relay leg: 4th)
1998	Asian Championships	Fukuoka, Japan	4th	100 m	11.74 (wind: -0.1 m/s)
1998	Asian Championships	Fukuoka, Japan	5th	200 m	23.67 (wind: +1.7 m/s)
1998	Asian Championships	Fukuoka, Japan	2nd	4×100 m relay	44.45 (relay leg: 4th)
1998	Asian Games	Bangkok, Thailand	5th	100 m	11.59 (wind: +2.3 m/s)
1998	Asian Games	Bangkok, Thailand	6th	200 m	23.58 (wind: +0.1 m/s)
1998	Asian Games	Bangkok, Thailand	5th	4×100 m relay	44.80 (relay leg: 2nd)
1999	World Indoor Championships	Maebashi, Japan	26th (h)	60 m	7.54
1999	World Indoor Championships	Maebashi, Japan	— (h)	200 m	DNS
1999	World Championships	Seville, Spain	37th (h)	100 m	11.64 (wind: -0.6 m/s)
1999	World Championships	Seville, Spain	14th (h)	4×100 m relay	44.80 (relay leg: 2nd)
2000	Asian Championships	Jakarta, Indonesia	7th	100 m	11.78 (wind: -1.0 m/s)
2000	Asian Championships	Jakarta, Indonesia	5th	4×100 m relay	45.26 (relay leg: 2nd)
2001	East Asian Games	Osaka, Japan	4th	200 m	23.69 (wind: -2.4 m/s)
2001	East Asian Games	Osaka, Japan	2nd	4×100 m relay	44.24 (relay leg: 2nd)
2002	Asian Games	Busan, South Korea	9th (h)	100 m	11.70 (wind: -0.2 m/s)
2002	Asian Games	Busan, South Korea	6th	200 m	23.91 (wind: -0.2 m/s)
2002	Asian Games	Busan, South Korea	4th	4×100 m relay	44.59 (relay leg: 2nd)
2003	World Championships	Paris, France	15th (h)	4×100 m relay	44.57 (relay leg: 4th)
2003	Asian Championships	Manila, Philippines	2nd	4×100 m relay	44.56 (relay leg: 1st)

== National titles ==
- Japanese Championships
  - 100 m: 1998, 1999, 2000, 2001, 2002, 2003, 2004
  - 200 m: 1998, 1999, 2000, 2001, 2002, 2003
