= 2002 Asian Athletics Championships – Women's 200 metres =

The women's 200 metres event at the 2002 Asian Athletics Championships was held in Colombo, Sri Lanka on 11–12 August.

== Medalists ==
Gold	Silver	Bronze
Susanthika Jayasinghe; Sri Lanka	Lyubov Perepelova; Uzbekistan	Yan Jiankui; China

== Results ==
=== Heats ===
Wind:
Heat 1: +1.7 m/s, Heat 2: +2.0 m/s, Heat 3: ?

Rank	Heat	Name	Nationality	Time	Notes
1	1	Susanthika Jayasinghe	Sri Lanka	22.96	Q
2	3	Yan Jiankui	China	24.12	Q
3	2	Lyubov Perepelova	Uzbekistan	24.14	Q
4	1	Guzel Khubbieva	Uzbekistan	24.38	Q
5	1	Chen Shu-Chuan	Chinese Taipei	24.46	q
6	2	Ni Xiaoli	China	24.57	Q
7	2	Sakie Nobuoka	Japan	25.03	q
8	2	H.J.C.C. Silva	Sri Lanka	25.03	PB
9	3	Anoma Sooriyaarachchi	Sri Lanka	25.32	Q
10	3	Mukti Saha	India	25.34	SB
11	3	Eriko Kusanagi	Japan	25.40	SB
12	2	Erum Khanum	Pakistan	25.47	PB
13	1	Nathalie Saykali	Lebanon	26.14	PB
14	1	Nashfa Amira	Maldives	29.04	PB
15	2	Wan Kin Yee	Hong Kong	30.31	
	1	Orranut Klomdee	Thailand	DQ	
	3	Ruqaya Al-Ghasra	Bahrain	DNS	

=== Final ===
Wind: +2.1 m/s

Rank	Name	Nationality	Time	Notes
1st place, gold medalist(s)	Susanthika Jayasinghe	Sri Lanka	22.84	
2nd place, silver medalist(s)	Lyubov Perepelova	Uzbekistan	23.76	
3rd place, bronze medalist(s)	Yan Jiankui	China	23.85	
4	Ni Xiaoli	China	24.04	
5	Guzel Khubbieva	Uzbekistan	24.15	
6	Chen Shu-Chuan	Chinese Taipei	24.27	
7	Anoma Sooriyaarachchi	Sri Lanka	25.12	SB
8	Sakie Nobuoka	Japan	25.13	
