= Athletics at the 1998 Asian Games – Men's 10,000 metres =

Men's 10,000 metres at the 1998 Asian Games
- Venue: Thammasat Stadium
- Dates: 13 December 1998
- Competitors: 14 from 14 nations

Medalists
gold medal	Kenji Takao	Japan
silver medal	Ahmed Ibrahim Warsama	Qatar
bronze medal	Gulab Chand	India

The men's 10,000 metres competition at the 1998 Asian Games in Bangkok, Thailand was held on 13 December at the Thammasat Stadium.

== Schedule ==
All times are Indochina Time (UTC+07:00)

Date	Time	Event
Sunday, 13 December 1998	17:25	Final

== Results ==
Legend

- DNF — Did not finish

Rank	Athlete	Time	Notes
1st place, gold medalist(s)	Kenji Takao (JPN)	28:45.66	
2nd place, silver medalist(s)	Ahmed Ibrahim Warsama (QAT)	28:46.55	
3rd place, bronze medalist(s)	Gulab Chand (IND)	29:10.53	
4	Baek Seung-do (KOR)	29:12.01	
5	Xia Fengyuan (CHN)	29:16.34	
6	Jafar Babakhani (IRI)	29:31.19	
7	Boonchu Chandecha (THA)	30:44.75	
8	Anuradha Cooray (SRI)	31:18.76	
9	Abdulrahman Abdulaziz (YEM)	31:36.77	
10	Hsu Gi-sheng (TPE)	31:39.42	
11	Sergey Zabavsky (TJK)	31:48.37	
12	Waleed Naji (PLE)	33:16.95	
13	S. Budhathoki (NEP)	34:02.13	
—	Md Elias Uddin (BAN)	DNF	
