= 2000 Asian Athletics Championships – Men's 4 × 100 metres relay =

The men's 4 × 100 metres relay event at the 2000 Asian Athletics Championships was held in Jakarta, Indonesia on 30–31 August.

== Medalists ==
Gold	Silver	Bronze
Thailand; Kongdech Natenee; Vissanu Sophanich; Ekkachai Janthana; Sittichai Suwonprateep	Japan; Masahiko Fukunaga; Hirofumi Nakagawa; Kazuhiro Takahashi; Akihiro Yasui	Saudi Arabia; Mohamed Al-Yami; Mubarak Ata Mubarak; Salem Al-Yami; Jamal Al-Saffar

== Results ==
=== Heats ===
Rank	Heat	Nation	Athletes	Time	Notes
1	2	Thailand	Kongdech Natenee, Vissanu Sophanich, Ekkachai Janthana, Sittichai Suwonprateep	38.95	Q, CR, NR
2	1	Japan	Masahiko Fukunaga, Hirofumi Nakagawa, Kazuhiro Takahashi, Akihiro Yasui	39.72	Q
3	2	Saudi Arabia	Mohamed Al-Yami, Mubarak Ata Mubarak, Salem Al-Yami, Jamal Al-Saffar	39.77	Q
4	1	India	Chinnain Thirugnanadurai, Ajay Raj Singh, Anand Menezes, Rajeev Balakrishnan	39.78	Q
5	2	Qatar	Mohamed Sultan Al-Sheib, Al-Waleed Abdulla, Abdullah Khamis, Khaled Youssef Al-Obaidli	40.34	Q
6	1	Oman	Mohamed Al-Maskary, Jihad Al-Sheikh, Mohamed Al-Houti, Ahmed Hadib	40.38	Q
7	1	South Korea	Lee Hyung-Keun, Kim Sang-Do, Kang Tae-Suk, Kim Jae-Da	40.42	q
8	1	Hong Kong	To Wai Lok, Ho Kwan Lung, Tang Hon Sing, Chiang Wai Hung	40.74	q
9	2	Indonesia	Sukari, Erwin Heru Susanto, Subakir, Rika Fardani	40.78	

=== Final ===
Rank	Team	Name	Time	Notes
1st place, gold medalist(s)	Thailand	Kongdech Natenee, Vissanu Sophanich, Ekkachai Janthana, Sittichai Suwonprateep	38.80	CR, NR
2nd place, silver medalist(s)	Japan	Masahiko Fukunaga, Hirofumi Nakagawa, Kazuhiro Takahashi, Akihiro Yasui	39.18	
3rd place, bronze medalist(s)	Saudi Arabia	Mohamed Al-Yami, Mubarak Ata Mubarak, Salem Al-Yami, Jamal Al-Saffar	39.60	
4	India	Chinnain Thirugnanadurai, Ajay Raj Singh, Anand Menezes, Rajeev Balakrishnan	39.70	NR
5	Oman	Mohamed Al-Maskary, Jihad Al-Sheikh, Mohamed Al-Houti, Ahmed Hadib	39.88	
6	Qatar	Mohamed Sultan Al-Sheib, Al-Waleed Abdulla, Abdullah Khamis, Khaled Youssef Al-Obaidli	39.90	
7	South Korea	Lee Hyung-Keun, Kim Sang-Do, Kang Tae-Suk, Kim Jae-Da	40.31	
8	Hong Kong	To Wai Lok, Ho Kwan Lung, Tang Hon Sing, Chiang Wai Hung	57.01	
