= Athletics at the 2002 Asian Games – Women's 400 metres hurdles =

Women's 400 metres hurdles at the 2002 Asian Games
- Venue: Busan Asiad Main Stadium
- Dates: 8 October 2002
- Competitors: 8 from 6 nations

Medalists
gold medal	Natalya Torshina	Kazakhstan
silver medal	Song Yinglan	China
bronze medal	Yao Yuehua	China

The women's 400 metres hurdles competition at the 2002 Asian Games in Busan, South Korea was held on 8 October at the Busan Asiad Main Stadium.

== Schedule ==
All times are Korea Standard Time (UTC+09:00)

Date	Time	Event
Tuesday, 8 October 2002	14:40	Final

== Records ==
Prior to this competition, the existing world, Asian and Games records were as follows.

World Record	Kim Batten (USA)	52.61	Gothenburg, Sweden	11 August 1995
Asian Record	Han Qing (CHN); Song Yinglan (CHN)	53.96	Beijing, China; Guangzhou, China	9 September 1993; 22 November 2001
Games Record	Leng Xueyan (CHN)	55.26	Hiroshima, Japan	14 October 1994

== Results ==
Rank	Athlete	Time	Notes
1st place, gold medalist(s)	Natalya Torshina (KAZ)	56.13	
2nd place, silver medalist(s)	Song Yinglan (CHN)	56.43	
3rd place, bronze medalist(s)	Yao Yuehua (CHN)	56.56	
4	Makiko Yoshida (JPN)	56.68	
5	Wassana Winatho (THA)	58.83	
6	Choi Hae-nam (KOR)	59.66	
7	Lee Yun-kyong (KOR)	59.92	
8	Diala El-Chab (LIB)	1:00.96	
