= 2000 Asian Athletics Championships – Women's 400 metres hurdles =

Sports competition

The women's 400 metres hurdles event at the 2000 Asian Athletics Championships was held in Jakarta, Indonesia on 31 August.

== Results ==
Rank	Name	Nationality	Time	Notes
1st place, gold medalist(s)	Song Yinglan	China	57.73	
2nd place, silver medalist(s)	Yasuko Igari	Japan	58.90	
3rd place, bronze medalist(s)	Noraseela Mohd Khalid	Malaysia	59.62	
4	Kim Su-Kyong	South Korea	1:00.76	
5	Nguyen Thi Tinh	Vietnam	1:01.46	
6	Yati Suningsih	Indonesia	1:02.32	
