= Athletics at the 1998 Asian Games – Men's 5000 metres =

Men's 5000 metres at the 1998 Asian Games
- Venue: Thammasat Stadium
- Dates: 19 December 1998
- Competitors: 14 from 10 nations

Medalists
gold medal	Mohamed Suleiman	Qatar
silver medal	Ahmed Ibrahim Warsama	Qatar
bronze medal	Baek Seung-do	South Korea

The men's 5000 metres competition at the 1998 Asian Games in Bangkok, Thailand was held on 19 December at the Thammasat Stadium.

== Schedule ==
All times are Indochina Time (UTC+07:00)

Date	Time	Event
Saturday, 19 December 1998	15:40	Final

== Results ==
Legend

- DNF — Did not finish

Rank	Athlete	Time	Notes
1st place, gold medalist(s)	Mohamed Suleiman (QAT)	13:55.79	
2nd place, silver medalist(s)	Ahmed Ibrahim Warsama (QAT)	13:56.65	
3rd place, bronze medalist(s)	Baek Seung-do (KOR)	13:57.11	
4	Gulab Chand (IND)	13:59.20	
5	Jun Hiratsuka (JPN)	14:03.62	
6	Xia Fengyuan (CHN)	14:15.89	
7	Seiji Kushibe (JPN)	14:19.45	
8	Bahadur Prasad (IND)	14:48.85	
9	Boonchu Chandecha (THA)	14:57.92	
10	Gyan Bahadur Bohara (NEP)	14:57.98	
11	Bishnu Bahadur Rana (NEP)	15:03.64	
12	Md Elias Uddin (BAN)	15:34.97	
13	Mohamed Abuhaseera (PLE)	16:02.89	
—	Fayad Bakour (SYR)	DNF	
