= Kazue Kakinuma =

Japanese sprinter (born 1974)

Personal information
- Nationality: Japanese
- Born: 16 June 1974 (age 52) Yorii, Saitama, Japan
- Education: Chuo University
- Height: 1.70 m (5 ft 7 in)
- Weight: 52 kg (115 lb)

Sport
- Country: Japan
- Sport: Track and field
- Event: Sprints

Achievements and titles
- Personal bests: 100 m: 11.75 (1992) 200 m: 23.82 (1992) 400 m: 52.95 (2001)
Medal record
Women's athletics
Representing Japan
Asian Games
Bronze medal – third place	1994 Hiroshima	4×100 m relay
Asian Championships
Silver medal – second place	2000 Jakarta	4×400 m relay
Bronze medal – third place	1991 Kuala Lumpur	4×100 m relay
Bronze medal – third place	1998 Fukuoka	4×400 m relay
East Asian Games
Silver medal – second place	2001 Osaka	4×400 m relay
Bronze medal – third place	2001 Osaka	400 m

Kazue Kakinuma (柿沼 和恵, Kakinuma Kazue; born 16 June 1974 in Yorii, Saitama) is a retired Japanese sprinter. She competed in the 4 × 100 metres relay at the 1991 World Championships in Tokyo and the 4 × 400 meters relay at the 2001 World Championships in Edmonton. She is the first Japanese woman to run 200 metres in under 24 seconds and 400 metres in under 53 seconds, a former Japanese record holder for both events.

== Personal bests ==
Event	Time (s)	Competition	Venue	Date	Notes
100 m	11.75 (wind: +2.0 m/s)	Saitama Championships	Ageo, Japan	26 June 1992	
200 m	23.82 (wind: +0.2 m/s)	National High School Championships	Miyazaki, Japan	4 August 1992	Former NR; Former NJR; Former HSR
400 m	52.95	East Asian Games	Osaka, Japan	24 May 2001	Former NR

== International competition ==
Year	Competition	Venue	Position	Event	Time	Notes
Representing Japan
1991	World Championships	Tokyo, Japan	13th (h)	4×100 m relay	44.85 (relay leg: 2nd)	
1991	Asian Championships	Kuala Lumpur, Malaysia	6th	200 m	24.65 (wind: +1.7 m/s)	
1991	Asian Championships	Kuala Lumpur, Malaysia	3rd	4×100 m relay	45.25 (relay leg: 2nd)	
1992	World Junior Championships	Seoul, South Korea	6th	400 m	53.45	NR
1992	World Junior Championships	Seoul, South Korea	6th	4×100 m relay	44.90 (relay leg: 2nd)	NJR
1992	World Junior Championships	Seoul, South Korea	5th	4×400 m relay	3:34.83 (relay leg: 4th)	NR
1994	Asian Games	Hiroshima, Japan	7th	200 m	24.89 (wind: -0.8 m/s)	
1994	Asian Games	Hiroshima, Japan	3rd	4×100 m relay	44.57 (relay leg: 3rd)	NR
1994	Asian Games	Hiroshima, Japan	4th	4×400 m relay	3:40.74 (relay leg: 2nd)	
1995	Universiade	Fukuoka, Japan	19th (h)	400 m	55.81	
1995	Universiade	Fukuoka, Japan	7th	4×400 m relay	3:38.91 (relay leg: 4th)	
1995	Asian Championships	Jakarta, Indonesia	5th	400 m	54.90	
1995	Asian Championships	Jakarta, Indonesia	5th	4×100 m relay	45.62 (relay leg: 2nd)	
1995	Asian Championships	Jakarta, Indonesia	4th	4×400 m relay	3:41.50 (relay leg: 2nd)	
1998	Asian Championships	Fukuoka, Japan	(h)	200 m	24.61 (wind: +0.1 m/s)	
1998	Asian Championships	Fukuoka, Japan	3rd	4×400 m relay	3:35.71 (relay leg: 2nd)	
2000	Asian Championships	Jakarta, Indonesia	6th	400 m	54.05	
2000	Asian Championships	Jakarta, Indonesia	2nd	4×400 m relay	3:37.15 (relay leg: 2nd)	
2001	East Asian Games	Osaka, Japan	3rd	400 m	52.95	NR
2001	East Asian Games	Osaka, Japan	2nd	4×400 m relay	3:33.06 (relay leg: 2nd)	NR
2001	World Championships	Edmonton, Canada	13th (h)	4×400 m relay	3:33.51 (relay leg: 2nd)	
2002	Asian Games	Busan, South Korea	9th (h)	400 m	55.35	
2002	Asian Games	Busan, South Korea	4th	4×400 m relay	3:33.23 (relay leg: 2nd)	

== National Championships titles ==
She was a seven-time national champion at the Japanese Championships.

Year	Event	Time	Notes
Representing Saitama Sakae High School
1992	200 m	24.11 (wind: -0.2 m/s)	
1992	4×100 m relay	45.72 (relay leg: 4th)	HSR
Representing Chuo University
1994	4×400 m relay	3:42.90 (relay leg: 4th)	GR
1995	400 m	53.56	NUR
Representing Mizuno
1999	400 m	53.49	
2000	400 m	54.07	
2001	400 m	53.62	
