= Svetlana Bodritskaya =

Kazakhstani sprinter (born 1971)

Medal record

Women's athletics

Representing Kazakhstan

Asian Championships
Silver medal – second place	1995 Jakarta	4×100 m
Silver medal – second place	1998 Fukuoka	400 m
Silver medal – second place	2003 Manila	4×400 m
Bronze medal – third place	1995 Jakarta	200 m
Bronze medal – third place	2003 Manila	400 m

Svetlana Aleksandrovna Bodritskaya (Russian: Светлана Александровна Бодрицкая; born 7 November 1971 in Shymkent, Ongutsik Qazaqstan) is a retired sprinter Kazakhstan, who specialized in the 400 metres. Her personal best time is 51.78 seconds, achieved in June 2004 in Almaty.

== Competition record ==
Year	Competition	Venue	Position	Event	Notes
Representing Kazakhstan
1995	Asian Championships	Jakarta, Indonesia	3rd	200 m	24.20
1996	Olympic Games	Atlanta, United States	38th (h)	400 m	53.24
1997	World Indoor Championships	Paris, France	13th (sf)	200 m	23.95
1997	World Championships	Athens, Greece	42nd (h)	200 m	23.96
1997	World Championships	Athens, Greece	27th (h)	400 m	53.28
1997	East Asian Games	Busan, South Korea	1st	400 m	52.92
1998	Asian Championships	Fukuoka, Japan	2nd	400 m	52.46
1998	Asian Games	Bangkok, Thailand	3rd	400 m	53.00
1998	Asian Games	Bangkok, Thailand	3rd	4 × 400 m relay	3:37.16
1999	World Championships	Seville, Spain	38th (h)	400 m	53.74
2000	Olympic Games	Sydney, Australia	41st (h)	400 m	53.91
2001	East Asian Games	Osaka, Japan	2nd	400 m	52.39
2002	Asian Games	Busan, South Korea	3rd	400 m	52.10
2002	Asian Games	Busan, South Korea	2nd	4 × 400 m relay	3:31.72
2003	World Championships	Paris, France	12th (h)	4 × 400 m relay	3:31.20
2003	Asian Championships	Manila, Philippines	3rd	400 m	53.19
2003	Afro-Asian Games	Hyderabad, India	3rd	4 × 400 m relay	3:32.41
2004	Olympic Games	Athens, Greece	34th (h)	400 m	53.35
