= 2002 Asian Athletics Championships – Women's 400 metres hurdles =

The women's 400 metres hurdles event at the 2002 Asian Athletics Championships was held in Colombo, Sri Lanka on 10–12 August.

== Medalists ==
| Gold | Silver | Bronze |
|---|---|---|
| Natalya Alimzhanova; Kazakhstan | Song Yinglan; China | Makiko Yoshida; Japan |

== Results ==
=== Heats ===
| Rank | Heat | Name | Nationality | Time | Notes |
|---|---|---|---|---|---|
| 1 | 2 | Natalya Alimzhanova | Kazakhstan | 57.24 | Q |
| 2 | 1 | Song Yinglan | China | 58.72 | Q |
| 3 | 2 | Yao Yuehua | China | 58.90 | Q |
| 4 | 1 | Makiko Yoshida | Japan | 59.21 | Q |
| 5 | 2 | Sachiko Eguchi | Japan | 59.22 | Q |
| 6 | 2 | Noraseela Mohd Khalid | Malaysia | 59.38 | q |
| 7 | 1 | Sahabani Oram | India | 1:00.95 | Q |
| 8 | 2 | Diala El-Chab | Lebanon | 1:02.57 | q |
| 9 | 2 | S.V.A. Kusumawathi | Sri Lanka | 1:02.70 | |
| 10 | 1 | Lee Yun-Kyong | South Korea | 1:02.94 | |
| 11 | 1 | M.A. Shayamali | Sri Lanka | 1:06.14 | PB |
| | 1 | K.K.C. Priyadharshani | Sri Lanka | DNF | |

=== Final ===
| Rank | Name | Nationality | Time | Notes |
|---|---|---|---|---|
| 1st place, gold medalist(s) | Natalya Alimzhanova | Kazakhstan | 55.81 | |
| 2nd place, silver medalist(s) | Song Yinglan | China | 56.49 | |
| 3rd place, bronze medalist(s) | Makiko Yoshida | Japan | 57.04 | |
| 4 | Yao Yuehua | China | 58.10 | |
| 5 | Sachiko Eguchi | Japan | 59.53 | |
| 6 | Noraseela Mohd Khalid | Malaysia | 59.85 | |
| 7 | Diala El-Chab | Lebanon | 1:01.70 | PB |
| 8 | Sahabani Oram | India | 1:05.36 | |
