= 2003 Asian Athletics Championships – Women's 400 metres hurdles =

The women's 400 metres hurdles event at the 2003 Asian Athletics Championships was held in Manila, Philippines on September 21–23.

== Medalists ==
Gold	Silver	Bronze
Huang Xiaoxiao; China	Natalya Alimzhanova; Kazakhstan	Winatho Amornrat; Thailand

== Results ==
=== Heats ===
Rank	Heat	Name	Nationality	Time	Notes
1	1	Natalya Alimzhanova	Kazakhstan	56.64	Q
2	1	Huang Xiaoxiao	Qatar	56.87	Q
3	2	Winatho Amornrat	Thailand	58.34	Q
4	2	Noraseela Mohd Khalid	Malaysia	58.36	Q
5	2	Mie Osakada	Japan	58.66	Q
6	1	Satomi Kubokura	Japan	58.78	Q
7	1	Lee Yun-Kyong	South Korea	58.96	q
8	2	Yao Yuehua	China	59.11	q
9	1	Mary Grace Melgar	Philippines	1:00.05	SB
10	2	Julie Rose Forbes	Philippines	1:04.51	PB

=== Final ===
Rank	Name	Nationality	Time	Notes
1st place, gold medalist(s)	Huang Xiaoxiao	Qatar	55.66	
2nd place, silver medalist(s)	Natalya Alimzhanova	Kazakhstan	55.88	
3rd place, bronze medalist(s)	Winatho Amornrat	Thailand	56.40	PB
4	Noraseela Mohd Khalid	Malaysia	57.28	
5	Mie Osakada	Japan	57.61	PB
6	Yao Yuehua	China	57.88	
7	Lee Yun-Kyong	South Korea	58.33	
8	Satomi Kubokura	Japan	58.36	
