= Makiko Yoshida =

Japanese hurdler

Personal information
- Nationality: Japanese
- Born: 16 July 1976 (age 49) Kōriyama, Japan
- Education: Fukushima University Graduate School
- Height: 1.64 m (5 ft 5 in)
- Weight: 46 kg (101 lb)

Sport
- Country: Japan
- Sport: Track and field
- Event: 400 metres hurdles
- Retired: November 2014
- Personal best(s): 400 m: 53.20 (2003); 400 m hurdles: 55.89 (2003)
Medal record
Women's athletics
Representing Japan
Asian Championships
Silver medal – second place	2000 Jakarta	4 × 400 m relay
Bronze medal – third place	2002 Colombo	4 × 400 m relay
Bronze medal – third place	2002 Colombo	400 m hurdles
Bronze medal – third place	2005 Incheon	400 m hurdles
Bronze medal – third place	2005 Incheon	4 × 400 m relay
East Asian Games
Silver medal – second place	2001 Osaka	4 × 400 m relay
Bronze medal – third place	2001 Osaka	400 m hurdles

Makiko Yoshida (吉田真希子, Yoshida Makiko; born 16 July 1976) is a retired Japanese athlete who specialised in the 400 metres hurdles. She was the former national record holder in the event and first Japanese female hurdler to run under 57 and 56 seconds. She won several medals at the regional level.

She retired in November 2014 and became the coach of Toho Bank Athletics Club.

== Competition record ==
Year	Competition	Venue	Position	Event	Notes
Representing Japan
1999	World Indoor Championships	Maebashi, Japan	17th (h)	800 m	2:15.65
2000	Asian Championships	Jakarta, Indonesia	4th	800 m	2:07.09
2000	Asian Championships	Jakarta, Indonesia	2nd	4x400 m relay	3:37.15
2001	East Asian Games	Osaka, Japan	3rd	400 m hurdles	57.33
2001	East Asian Games	Osaka, Japan	2nd	4x400 m relay	3:33.06
2001	World Championships	Edmonton, Canada	13th (h)	4x400 m relay	3:33.51
2002	Asian Championships	Colombo, Sri Lanka	4th	400 m	54.67
2002	Asian Championships	Colombo, Sri Lanka	3rd	400 m hurdles	57.04
2002	Asian Championships	Colombo, Sri Lanka	2nd	4x400 m relay	3:38.29
2002	Asian Games	Busan, South Korea	4th	400 m hurdles	56.68
2002	Asian Games	Busan, South Korea	4th	4x400 m relay	3:33.23
2003	World Championships	Paris, France	23rd (h)	400 m hurdles	57.08
2005	Asian Championships	Incheon, South Korea	3rd	400 m hurdles	56.85
2005	Asian Championships	Incheon, South Korea	3rd	4x400 m relay	3:33.54
2006	Asian Games	Doha, Qatar	7th	400 m hurdles	58.90

== National titles ==
- Japanese Championships
  - 400 metres - 2002, 2003
  - 400 metres hurdles - 2000, 2001, 2002, 2003, 2004, 2006

== Personal bests ==
Outdoor

- 400 metres – 53.20 (Yokohama 2003)
- 800 metres – 2:06.24 (Kobe 2006)
- 400 metres hurdles – 55.89 (Yokohama 2003): Former national record
- 4 × 400 metres relay - 3:30.53 (Osaka 2007): Former national record

Indoor

- 400 metres – 55.13 (Tianjin 2003)
- 800 metres – 2:15.65 (Maebashi 1999)
- 4 × 400 metres relay - 3:38.43 (Yokohama 2003): Current national record

=== Masters national record holder ===
- 400 metres hurdles – 59.50 (Yamaguchi 2014): Current W35 national record
