= Chen Shu-chuan =

Taiwanese sprinter

Personal information
- Born: 20 April 1978 (age 48)
- Height: 1.71 m (5 ft 7 in)
- Weight: 55 kg (121 lb)

Sport
- Sport: Track and field
- Events: 100 m, 200 m
Medal record
Women's athletics
Representing Chinese Taipei
Asian Championships
Bronze medal – third place	2007 Amman	4×100 m

Chen Shu-chuan (Chinese: 陳淑娟; pinyin: Chén Shújuān; Wade–Giles: Chʻên^{2} Shu^{2}-chüan^{1}; born 20 April 1978) is a Taiwanese retired athlete who specialised in the sprinting events. She represented her country at the 2000 Summer Olympics without advancing to the second round.

Her personal bests are 11.47 seconds in the 100 metres (-0.5 m/s, Banchiao 2003) and 23.47 seconds in the 200 metres (+1.0 m/s, Bangkok 1997).

== Competition record ==
Year	Competition	Venue	Position	Event	Notes
Representing Chinese Taipei
1996	World Junior Championships	Sydney, Australia	30th (qf)	100 m	12.27
1996	World Junior Championships	Sydney, Australia	15th (sf)	200 m	24.60
1996	Asian Junior Championships	New Delhi, India	2nd	100 m	12.03
1996	Asian Junior Championships	New Delhi, India	3rd	200 m	24.39
1997	Asian Junior Championships	Bangkok, Thailand	1st	100 m	11.70
1997	Asian Junior Championships	Bangkok, Thailand	1st	200 m	23.47
1997	Asian Junior Championships	Bangkok, Thailand	3rd	4 × 100 m relay	45.47
1998	Asian Games	Bangkok, Thailand	14th (h)	100 m	11.94
1998	Asian Games	Bangkok, Thailand	7th	200 m	23.96
2000	Olympic Games	Sydney, Australia	63rd (h)	100 m	12.22
2002	Asian Championships	Colombo, Sri Lanka	7th	100 m	12.09
2002	Asian Championships	Colombo, Sri Lanka	6th	200 m	24.27
2002	Asian Games	Busan, South Korea	12th (h)	100 m	11.98
2002	Asian Games	Busan, South Korea	10th (h)	200 m	24.29
2003	Universiade	Daegu, South Korea	19th (qf)	100 m	12.17
2003	Universiade	Daegu, South Korea	14th (sf)	200 m	25.38
2005	Universiade	İzmir, Turkey	26th (qf)	100 m	12.45
2005	Universiade	İzmir, Turkey	34th (h)	200 m	25.34
2007	Asian Championships	Amman, Jordan	6th	200 m	24.58
2007	Asian Championships	Amman, Jordan	3rd	4 × 100 m relay	46.48
2009	Asian Championships	Guangzhou, China	19th (h)	200 m	25.53
2009	Asian Championships	Guangzhou, China	5th	4 × 100 m relay	45.81
2009	East Asian Games	Hong Kong, China	3rd	4 × 400 m relay	3:51.08
