= Yaznee Nasheeda =

Maldivian middle-distance runner

Personal information
- Nationality: Maldivian
- Born: 8 September 1977 (age 48)

Sport
- Sport: Middle-distance running
- Event: 800 metres

Yaznee Nasheeda (born 8 September 1977) is a Maldivian middle-distance runner specializing in the 800 metres. She was the Maldivian national record-holder in the event, competing at several international championships and the women's 800 metres at the 1996 Summer Olympics before becoming a coach.

== Career ==
Nasheeda was coached by Japanese trainer Hiraoki Higuchi. She had to train on the road while avoiding stones, people, and cars because she had no access to a track in the Maldives.

Nasheeda finished 7th in her 200 m and 400 m heats at the 1993 World Championships, failing to advance. She set a Maldivian record running 2:34.18 over 800 m to finish 7th in her heat at the 1995 World Championships.

At the 1996 Olympics, Nasheeda was seeded in the 3rd 800 m heat, running 2:36.85 to finish 7th. Nasheeda's time was 36 seconds behind the rest of the field, but the crowd cheered her finish. She said, "I think it went OK. I don't feel anything bad about what happened".

She was 7th in her heat at the 1997 World Championships 800 m. She entered the 400 m and 800 m at the 1998 Commonwealth Games, finishing 7th in her heat in both events. She was 5th in the second 800 m heat at the 1998 Asian Games, running 2:31.50. She set her personal best of 2:28.92 minutes in 1999.

Nasheeda was 10th in the 2000 Asian Championships 800 m final while she finished 7th in her 400 m heat. She was 6th in her 400 m heat at the 2002 Commonwealth Games in a time of 64.14 seconds.

== Personal life ==
Nasheeda became an athletics coach. She coached sprinter Fathimath Ibrahim, who represented the Maldives at the 2020 Summer Paralympics.She was the chef de mission of the Maldivian team at the 2015 Commonwealth Youth Games.

In May 2024, Nasheeda was elected as a female athlete representative at the Maldives Athletic Association.
