= Galina Pedan =

Kyrgyzstani hurdler

Medal record

Women's athletics

Representing Kyrgyzstan

Asian Championships
Bronze medal – third place	2007 Amman	400 m hurdles

Galina Pedan (born 29 May 1983) is a Kyrgyzstani athlete who specializes in the 400 metres hurdles.

She finished eighth at the 2005 Asian Championships and fifth at the 2006 Asian Games. She also competed at the 2004 and 2008 Olympic Games without reaching the final.

Her personal best time was 56.16 seconds, achieved in July 2004 in Almaty.

== Competition record ==
Year	Competition	Venue	Position	Event	Notes
Representing Kyrgyzstan
2002	Asian Junior Championships	Bangkok, Thailand	2nd	400 m hurdles	60.52
2004	Olympic Games	Athens, Greece	31st (h)	400 m hurdles	59.02
2005	Asian Championships	Incheon, South Korea	8th	400 m hurdles	59.05
2006	Asian Games	Doha, Qatar	5th	400 m hurdles	58.12
2007	Asian Championships	Amman, Jordan	3rd	400 m hurdles	59.13
2008	Asian Indoor Championships	Doha, Qatar	6th	400 m	57.02
2008	Olympic Games	Beijing, China	27th (h)	400 m hurdles	60.31
