= Paramjeet Kaur =

Indian athletics competitor (born 1976)

Personal information
- Nationality: Indian
- Born: 2 April 1976 (age 50) Meerut, Uttar Pradesh, India
Medal record
Women's athletics
Representing India
Asian Championships
Gold medal – first place	2000 Jakarta	4×400 m

Paramjeet Kaur (born 2 April 1976, in Meerut, Uttar Pradesh) is an Indian former athlete. She won a gold medal in the women's 4X400m relay in the 2000 Asian Athletics Championships held in Jakarta, Indonesia. She represented India in the Sydney Olympics 2000 in the women's 4X400 relay event. She is the first woman athlete from Rajasthan to represent India in Olympics until 2000. She is also the first woman Olympian from the Indian Revenue Service.

Her moment of glory and pride came when she along with K. M. Beenamol, Jincy Philips, and Manjula Kuriakose broke a 13-year-old national record in the women's 4x400 relay event in the Inter State Senior Athletics Championships held in Chennai. They also clocked the world's sixth fastest time in the long relay in 2000. These quarter milers recorded a time of 3:28.11 sec, smashing the previous national record of 3:31.55 sec set in Rome in 1987 by one of Indian athletics' best relay squads, P.T. Usha, Shiny Abraham, Vandana Shanbagh, and Vandana Rao. Their time was better than the Asian Games record of 3:29.11 sec created by China in Hiroshima.

She was awarded "Best Athlete of the Meet" for various championships during her career including three consecutive years in Inter-University meet.

== Awards and honours ==
- Maharana Pratap Award from Government of Rajasthan (1993–97)
- Aravali Award from Maharaja of Udaipur (1993)
- Nahar Sanman Puruskar from Rajasthani Welfare Association (1997)

== Achievements ==
Year	Competition	Venue	Position	Event	Notes
Representing India
2000	Asian Championships	Jakarta, Indonesia	1st	4 × 400 m relay	3:31.54 NR
2000	Olympic Games	Sydney, Australia		4 × 400 m relay	3:31.46
1999	South Asian Federation Games	Kathmandu, Nepal	1st	4 × 100 m relay	
1998	South Asian Athletic Federation	Colombo, Sri Lanka	2nd	4 × 400 m relay	
1996	Asian Junior Athletic Championships	New Delhi, India	1st	4 × 400 m relay	
1996	Asian Junior Athletic Championships	New Delhi, India	2nd	400 m	
1992	Singapore Open Track & Field Championship	Singapore	1st	4 × 400 m relay	
1992	Singapore Open Track & Field Championship	Singapore	2nd	4 × 100 m relay	
1992	Asian Junior Athletic Championships	New Delhi, India	1st	4 × 400 m relay	3:41.27

== Personal life ==
Paramjeet Kaur is married to Vijay Kumar Chaudhary, a sports enthusiast. They have two children, Yash and Mansi.
