= Athletics at the 1998 Asian Games – Women's discus throw =

Women's discus throw at the 1998 Asian Games
- Venue: Thammasat Stadium
- Dates: 13 December 1998
- Competitors: 7 from 5 nations

Medalists
gold medal	Luan Zhili	China
silver medal	Liu Fengying	China
bronze medal	Neelam Jaswant Singh	India

The women's discus throw competition at the 1998 Asian Games in Bangkok, Thailand was held on 13 December at the Thammasat Stadium.

== Schedule ==
All times are Indochina Time (UTC+07:00)

Date	Time	Event
Sunday, 13 December 1998	15:00	Final

== Results ==
Rank	Athlete	Result	Notes
1st place, gold medalist(s)	Luan Zhili (CHN)	63.43	
2nd place, silver medalist(s)	Liu Fengying (CHN)	59.34	
3rd place, bronze medalist(s)	Neelam Jaswant Singh (IND)	55.09	
4	Swaranjeet Kaur (IND)	51.46	
5	Miyoko Nakanishi (JPN)	49.73	
6	Park Kyong-hee (KOR)	46.57	
7	Sunisa Yooyao (THA)	46.47	
