= Akihiro Yasui =

Japanese sprinter (born 1977)

Personal information
- Nationality: Japanese
- Born: 2 October 1977 (age 48) Shiga Prefecture, Japan
- Education: Ryukoku University

Sport
- Country: Japan
- Sport: Track and field
- Event: 100 metres

Achievements and titles
- Personal best(s): 100 m: 10.21 (2000); 200 m: 20.93
Medal record
Men's athletics
Representing Japan
Asian Championships
Silver medal – second place	2000 Jakarta	4×100 m relay
East Asian Games
Gold medal – first place	2001 Osaka	4×100 m relay

Akihiro Yasui (安井 章泰, Yasui Akihiro; born 2 October 1977 in Shiga Prefecture) is a Japanese retired track and field sprinter who specialized in the 100 metres. He competed in the 100 metres at the 2001 World Championships.

== Personal bests ==
Event	Time (s)	Competition	Venue	Date	Notes
100 m	10.21 (+2.0 m/s)	Shiga Championships	Ōtsu, Japan	24 June 2000	
100 m	10.20 (+4.3 m/s)		Shizuoka, Japan	3 May 2000	Wind-assisted

== International competition ==
Year	Competition	Venue	Position	Event	Time
Representing Japan
1999	Universiade	Palma de Mallorca, Spain	18th (qf)	100 m	10.57 (wind: 0.0 m/s)
1999	Universiade	Palma de Mallorca, Spain	5th	4×100 m relay	39.37 (relay leg: 2nd)
2000	Asian Championships	Jakarta, Indonesia	5th	100 m	10.43 (wind: +0.2 m/s)
2000	Asian Championships	Jakarta, Indonesia	2nd	4×100 m relay	39.18 (relay leg: 4th)
2001	East Asian Games	Osaka, Japan	1st	4×100 m relay	38.93 (relay leg: 2nd) GR
2001	World Championships	Edmonton, Canada	36th (h)	100 m	10.51 (wind: +0.7 m/s)
