= 2005 Asian Athletics Championships – Women's 400 metres hurdles =

The women's 400 metres hurdles event at the 2005 Asian Athletics Championships was held in Incheon, South Korea on September 2–4.

== Medalists ==
| Gold | Silver | Bronze |
|---|---|---|
| Huang Xiaoxiao; China | Noraseela Mohd Khalid; Malaysia | Makiko Yoshida; China |

== Results ==
=== Heats ===
| Rank | Heat | Name | Nationality | Time | Notes |
|---|---|---|---|---|---|
| 1 | 1 | Noraseela Mohd Khalid | Malaysia | 57.25 | Q |
| 2 | 2 | Huang Xiaoxiao | China | 57.43 | Q |
| 3 | 1 | Makiko Yoshida | Japan | 58.13 | Q |
| 4 | 2 | Satomi Kubokura | Japan | 58.14 | Q |
| 5 | 1 | Natalya Alimzhanova | Kazakhstan | 58.63 | Q |
| 6 | 2 | Tatyana Azarova | Kazakhstan | 58.79 | Q |
| 7 | 2 | Mary Grace Melgar | Philippines | 59.01 | q |
| 8 | 2 | Galina Pedan | Kyrgyzstan | 1:00.32 | q |
| 9 | 1 | S.V.A. Kusumawathi | Sri Lanka | 1:01.83 | |
| 10 | 1 | Park Mi-Jin | South Korea | 1:03.90 | |

=== Final ===
| Rank | Name | Nationality | Time | Notes |
|---|---|---|---|---|
| 1st place, gold medalist(s) | Huang Xiaoxiao | China | 55.63 | CR |
| 2nd place, silver medalist(s) | Noraseela Mohd Khalid | Malaysia | 56.39 | NR |
| 3rd place, bronze medalist(s) | Makiko Yoshida | Japan | 56.85 | |
| 4 | Satomi Kubokura | Japan | 57.23 | |
| 5 | Natalya Alimzhanova | Kazakhstan | 57.50 | |
| 6 | Mary Grace Melgar | Philippines | 58.09 | PB |
| 7 | Tatyana Azarova | Kazakhstan | 58.68 | |
| 8 | Galina Pedan | Kyrgyzstan | 59.05 | |
