= Athletics at the 1998 Asian Games – Women's 400 metres hurdles =

Women's 400 metres hurdles at the 1998 Asian Games
- Venue: Thammasat Stadium
- Dates: 17 December 1998
- Competitors: 7 from 6 nations

Medalists
gold medal	Natalya Torshina	Kazakhstan
silver medal	Hsu Pei-ching	Chinese Taipei
bronze medal	Li Yulian	China

The women's 400 metres hurdles competition at the 1998 Asian Games in Bangkok, Thailand was held on 17 December at the Thammasat Stadium.

== Schedule ==
All times are Indochina Time (UTC+07:00)

Date	Time	Event
Thursday, 17 December 1998	15:20	Final

== Results ==
Rank	Athlete	Time	Notes
1st place, gold medalist(s)	Natalya Torshina (KAZ)	55.33	
2nd place, silver medalist(s)	Hsu Pei-ching (TPE)	55.71	
3rd place, bronze medalist(s)	Li Yulian (CHN)	55.93	
4	Li Rui (CHN)	56.16	
5	Mika Sasaki (JPN)	58.78	
6	Nguyễn Thị Hoàng Thuỷ (VIE)	1:01.19	
7	Nuchanart Nukboon (THA)	1:01.79	
