= Mohamed Al-Yami =

Saudi Arabian sprinter

Personal information
- Nationality: Saudi Arabian
- Born: 15 May 1980 (age 46)

Sport
- Sport: Sprinting
- Event: 4 × 100 metres relay
Medal record
Men's athletics
Representing Saudi Arabia
Asian Championships
Bronze medal – third place	2000 Jakarta	4×100 m

Mohamed Al-Yami (born 15 May 1980) is a Saudi Arabian sprinter. He competed in the men's 4 × 100 metres relay at the 2000 Summer Olympics.
