= 2007 Asian Athletics Championships – Women's 400 metres hurdles =

The women's 400 metres hurdles event at the 2007 Asian Athletics Championships was held in Amman, Jordan on July 27, 2007.

== Results ==
Rank	Lane	Name	Nationality	Time	Notes
1st place, gold medalist(s)	2	Satomi Kubokura	Japan	56.74	
2nd place, silver medalist(s)	1	Ruan Zhuofen	China	57.63	
3rd place, bronze medalist(s)	3	Galina Pedan	Kyrgyzstan	59.13	
4	5	Ghofrane Mohammad	Syria	59.21	
5	4	Sayaka Aoki	Japan	59.55	
6	6	Abeer Al-Hiyari	Jordan	1:10.38	
