= Kongdech Natenee =

Thai sprinter (born 1975)

Personal information
- Nationality: Thai
- Born: 29 May 1975 (age 51)

Sport
- Sport: Sprinting
- Event: 4 × 100 metres relay
Medal record
Men's athletics
Representing Thailand
Asian Championships
Gold medal – first place	2000 Jakarta	4×100 m

Kongdech Natenee (born 29 May 1975) is a Thai sprinter. He competed in the 4 × 100 metres relay at the 1996 Summer Olympics and the 2000 Summer Olympics.
