= Lyudmila Dmitriadi =

Uzbekistani sprinter (born 1969)

Lyudmila Leonidovna Dmitriadi (born 24 September 1969) is an Uzbekistani sprinter who specialized in the 100 metres. She competed in the women's 100 metres at the 1996 Summer Olympics.

Her personal best time is 11.44 seconds, achieved in June 2001 in Bishkek.

== Achievements ==
Year	Tournament	Venue	Result	Extra
2002	Asian Games	Busan, South Korea	3rd	4 × 100 m relay
