= Kazuhiro Takahashi (sprinter) =

Japanese sprinter

Personal information
- Nationality: Japanese
- Born: 27 July 1976 (age 49) Nara Prefecture, Japan
- Education: Waseda University
- Height: 1.65 m (5 ft 5 in)
- Weight: 60 kg (130 lb)

Sport
- Country: Japan
- Sport: Track and field
- Event: Sprints
- Retired: 2004

Achievements and titles
- Personal best(s): 100 m: 10.24 (1994); 200 m: 20.57 (1994)
Medal record
Men's athletics
Representing Japan
Asian Championships
Silver medal – second place	2000 Jakarta	4×100 m relay

Kazuhiro Takahashi (高橋 和裕, Takahashi Kazuhiro; born 27 July 1976 in Nara Prefecture) is a Japanese retired sprinter. He currently holds the Asian indoor record in the 4 × 400 metres relay with 3:05.90 minutes, achieved with teammates Jun Osakada, Masayoshi Kan and Shunji Karube in March 1999 in Maebashi. He also formerly held the Japanese record in the 200 metres with 20.57 seconds.

He is currently (2020) the athletic director at Hamamatsu Koto High School.

== Personal bests ==
- 100 metres – 10.24 (+0.4 m/s, Toyama 1994): Former national junior (U20) and high school record
- 200 metres – 20.57 (+0.5 m/s, Osaka 1994): Former national senior, junior (U20) and high school record
- 4×400 metres relay (Indoor) – 3:05.90 (1st leg, Maebashi 1999): Current Asian indoor record

== International competitions ==
Year	Competition	Venue	Position	Event	Time
Representing Japan
1994	Asian Games	Hiroshima, Japan	5th	200 m	21.01 (wind: +1.7 m/s)
1999	World Indoor Championships	Maebashi, Japan	24th (h)	200 m	21.35
1999	World Indoor Championships	Maebashi, Japan	5th	4×400 m relay	3:06.22 (relay leg: 1st)
2000	Asian Championships	Jakarta, Indonesia	10th (sf)	400 m	47.46
2000	Asian Championships	Jakarta, Indonesia	2nd	4×100 m relay	39.18 (relay leg: 2nd)

== National titles ==
- National Championships
  - 200 m: 1994
- National Corporate Championships
  - 200 m: 2000
- National High School Championships
  - 100 m: 1994
  - 200 m: 1994
  - 4×100 m relay: 1994
  - 4×400 m relay: 1994
- National Sports Festival
  - 100 m (Boys A): 1994
