= Saraswati Saha =

Indian sprinter (born 1979)

Personal information
- Full name: Saraswati Dey-Saha
- Born: 23 November 1979 (age 46) Chittamara, Tripura, India
- Height: 1.54 m (5 ft 1 in)

Sport
- Sport: Athletics
- Events: 100 m, 200 m

Achievements and titles
- Personal bests: 100 m: 11.40 (2000); 200 m: 22.82 NR (2002)
Medal record
Women's athletics
Representing India
Asian Games
Gold medal – first place	2002 Busan	200 m
Asian Championships
Gold medal – first place	1998 Fukuoka	4×100m
Silver medal – second place	2000 Jakarta	4×100m
Silver medal – second place	2000 Jakarta	100 m

Saraswati Dey-Saha (born 23 November 1979) is an Indian former sprinter. She is the first Indian woman to break the 23-second barrier in 200 m and holds the current national record of 22.82 seconds set in Ludhiana in 2002. The highlight of her career was the 200 m gold medal she won at the 2002 Asian Games. Saraswati was honored with the Arjuna Award in 2002.

== Career ==
Saraswati represented India in 4 x 100 metres relay together with P. T. Usha, E. B. Shyla, and Rachita at the 1998 Asian Championships in Athletics where her team won the gold medal on way to setting the current national record of 44.43 s. Later in the 4 x 100 metres relay at 2000 Sydney Olympics her team - consisting of V. Jayalakshmi, Vinita Tripathi, and Rachita Mistry - clocked a time of 45.20 s in the first round. The team finished last in their heats. She also represented India in the women's 200 m event at the 2004 Athens Olympics.

Saraswati quit competitive athletics in July 2006 owing to the injury to her Achilles tendon, occurred after the Busan Asian Games.
