= Natalya Torshina-Alimzhanova =

Kazakhstani hurdler (born 1968)

Medal record

Women's athletics

Representing Kazakhstan

Asian Championships
Gold medal – first place	1993 Manila	400 m hurdles
Gold medal – first place	2002 Colombo	400 m hurdles
Silver medal – second place	1998 Fukuoka	400 m hurdles
Silver medal – second place	2003 Manila	400 m hurdles
Silver medal – second place	2005 Incheon	4×400 m
Bronze medal – third place	1995 Jakarta	400 m hurdles

Natalya Torshina-Alimzhanova (born 4 October 1968 in Kemerovo, Russian SFSR) is a Russian-Kazakhstani athlete who specializes in the 400 metres hurdles. Her personal best time is 54.50 seconds, achieved in May 2000 in Vila Real de Santo António. She competed at three Olympic Games.

== Competition record ==
Year	Competition	Venue	Position	Event	Notes
Representing Kazakhstan
1993	Asian Championships	Manila, Philippines	1st	400 m hurdles	56.70
1993	World Championships	Stuttgart, Germany	8th	400 m hurdles	55.78
1994	Goodwill Games	St. Petersburg, Russia	8th	400 m hurdles	58.25
1994	Asian Games	Hiroshima, Japan	2nd	400 m hurdles	55.81
1995	Asian Championships	Jakarta, Indonesia	3rd	400 m hurdles	58.88
1995	World Championships	Gothenburg, Sweden	8th	400 m hurdles	56.75
1996	Olympic Games	Atlanta, USA	17th (h)	400 m hurdles	55.94
1997	East Asian Games	Busan, South Korea	1st	400 m hurdles	55.90
1997	World Championships	Athens, Greece	19th (h)	400 m hurdles	56.64
1998	Asian Championships	Fukuoka, Japan	2nd	400 m hurdles	56.34
1998	Asian Games	Bangkok, Thailand	1st	400 m hurdles	55.33
1999	World Championships	Seville, Spain	12th (sf)	400 m hurdles	55.26
2000	Olympic Games	Sydney, Australia	15th (sf)	400 m hurdles	56.22
2001	World Championships	Edmonton, Canada	13th (sf)	400 m hurdles	56.45
2002	Asian Championships	Colombo, Sri Lanka	1st	400 m hurdles	55.81
2002	Asian Games	Busan, South Korea	1st	400 m hurdles	56.13
2002	Asian Games	Busan, South Korea	1st	4 × 400 m relay	3:31.72
2003	World Championships	Paris, France	8th (sf)	400 m hurdles	55.24
2003	World Championships	Paris, France	12th (h)	4 × 400 m relay	3:31.20
2003	Asian Championships	Manila, Philippines	2nd	400 m hurdles	55.88
2003	Afro-Asian Games	Hyderabad, India	1st	400 m hurdles	55.81
2003	Afro-Asian Games	Hyderabad, India	3rd	4 × 400 m relay	3:32.41
2004	Olympic Games	Athens, Greece	12th (sf)	400 m hurdles	55.08
2004	World Athletics Final	Monte Carlo, Monaco	6th	400 m hurdles	56.12
2005	World Championships	Helsinki, Finland	24th (h)	400 m hurdles	58.26
2005	Asian Championships	Incheon, South Korea	5th	400 m hurdles	57.50
2005	Asian Championships	Incheon, South Korea	2nd	4 × 400 m relay	3:32.61

In addition she has four gold medals from the Central Asian Games.
