= Song Yinglan =

Chinese hurdler

Medal record

Women's athletics

Representing China

Asian Championships
Gold medal – first place	2000 Jakarta	400 m hurdles
Silver medal – second place	2002 Colombo	400 m hurdles

Song Yinglan (born 14 September 1975) is a retired female Chinese hurdler in the 400 metres.

Her personal best time is 53.96 seconds, achieved in November 2001 in Guangzhou. This is the current Asian record, shared with Han Qing who ran in the same time in September 1993 in Beijing.

== International competitions ==
Year	Competition	Venue	Position	Event	Notes
Representing China
2000	Asian Championships	Jakarta, Indonesia	1st	400 m hurdles	57.73
2001	East Asian Games	Osaka, Japan	2nd	400 m hurdles	56.94
2001	Universiade	Beijing, China	10th (sf)	400 m hurdles	57.50
2001	Universiade	Beijing, China	7th	4 × 400 m relay	3:39.89
2002	Asian Championships	Colombo, Sri Lanka	2nd	400 m hurdles	56.49
2002	Asian Games	Busan, South Korea	2nd	400 m hurdles	56.43
