= Tatyana Azarova =

Kazakhstani hurdler (born 1985)

Personal information
- Born: December 2, 1985 (age 40) Pavlodarskaya Oblast, Kazakh SSR, Soviet Union
- Height: 1.67 m (5 ft 5 1/2 in)
- Weight: 54 kg (119 lb)

Sport
- Country: Kazakhstan
- Sport: Athletics
- Event: 400m Hurdles
Medal record
Women's athletics
Representing Kazakhstan
Asian Indoor Championships
Silver medal – second place	2008 Doha	4×400 m

Tatyana Nikolaevna Azarova (born 2 December 1985) is a Kazakhstani athlete who specializes in the 400 metres hurdles. Her personal best time is 54.78 seconds, achieved in May 2007 in Almaty. She competed in the 2008 Olympic Games and the 2012 Olympic Games.

== Competition record ==
Year	Competition	Venue	Position	Event	Notes
Representing Kazakhstan
2004	World Junior Championships	Grosseto, Italy	6th	400 m hurdles	58.41
2005	Universiade	İzmir, Turkey	24th (h)	400 m hurdles	60.52
2005	Universiade	İzmir, Turkey	6th	4 × 400 m hurdles	3:32.83
2005	Asian Championships	Incheon, South Korea	7th	400 m hurdles	58.68
2006	Asian Games	Doha, Qatar	6th	400 m hurdles	58.80
2006	Asian Games	Doha, Qatar	2nd	4 × 400 m relay	3:33.86
2007	Universiade	Bangkok, Thailand	1st	400 m hurdles	55.52
2007	World Championships	Osaka, Japan	16th (sf)	400 m hurdles	55.74
2007	Asian Indoor Games	Macau	2nd	400 m	53.68
2007	Asian Indoor Games	Macau	1st	4 × 400 m relay	3:37.59
2008	Asian Indoor Championships	Doha, Qatar	2nd	4 × 400 m relay	3:38.10
2009	World Championships	Berlin, Germany	29th (h)	400 m hurdles	57.90
2012	Olympic Games	London, United Kingdom	37th (h)	400 m hurdles	58.53
