= Huang Xiaoxiao =

Chinese hurdler (born 1983)

Personal information
- Born: March 3, 1983 (age 43)
- Height: 1.76 m (5 ft 9 1/2 in)
- Weight: 66 kg (146 lb)

Sport
- Country: China
- Sport: Athletics
- Event: 400m Hurdles
Medal record
Women's athletics
Representing China
Asian Championships
Gold medal – first place	2003 Manila	400 m hurdles
Gold medal – first place	2003 Manila	4×400 m
Gold medal – first place	2005 Incheon	400 m hurdles

Huang Xiaoxiao (simplified Chinese: 黄潇潇; traditional Chinese: 黃瀟瀟; pinyin: Huáng Xiāoxiāo; born March 3, 1983, in Qingdao, Shandong) is a Chinese hurdler who specialises in the 400 metres hurdles.

Huang made her first impression on the world stage at the Athletics at the 2003 Summer Universiade, where she took a silver in the 400 m hurdles. Although disappointed when she did not qualify for the final heat of the Athens Olympics in 2004, Huang ran solidly at the next year's 2005 World Championships in Athletics, where she finished fifth in the 400m hurdles. She returned to the competition at the 2009 World Championships in Athletics and she reached the semifinals of the event.

The majority of her medals come from continental competitions in Asia. She won the hurdles title at the 2005 Asian Athletics Championships in a Championship record time of 55.63 seconds. Huang won at the 2005 East Asian Games later that year, setting a Games record in the process. She represented Asia at the 2006 IAAF World Cup, coming sixth in the final. Her strength on the Asian athletics scene was again confirmed at the 2006 Asian Games where she again beat all-comers.

Huang dominates the sport at home. At the 10th National Games in 2005, she won gold medals in the 400m and 400m hurdles. She repeated the feat at the 11th Chinese National Games in 2009, and also took the silver with Shandong in the 400 m relay event.

Her personal best time is 54.00 seconds, achieved during the heats at the 2007 World Championships in Osaka. The current Chinese and Asian record is 53.96 seconds.

== International competitions ==
Year	Competition	Venue	Position	Event	Notes
2003	Universiade	Daegu, South Korea	2nd	400 m hurdles	
2003	Universiade	Daegu, South Korea	7th	400 m	
2003	Asian Championships	Manila, Philippines	1st	400 m hurdles	
2005	World Championships	Helsinki, Finland	5th	400 m hurdles	
2005	Asian Championships	Incheon, South Korea	1st	400 m hurdles	
2006	World Cup	Athens, Greece	6th	400 m hurdles	
2006	Asian Games	Doha, Qatar	1st	400 m hurdles	
2006	Asian Games	Doha, Qatar	3rd	4 × 400 m relay	
2007	World Championships	Osaka, Japan	5th	400 m hurdles	
