= Noraseela Mohd Khalid =

Malaysian hurdler

Personal information
- Born: 27 September 1979 (age 47)
- Height: 1.66 m (5 ft 5 1/2 in)
- Weight: 55 kg (121 lb)

Sport
- Country: Malaysia
- Sport: Athletics
- Event: 400m Hurdles
Medal record
Women's athletics
Representing Malaysia
Asian Championships
Silver medal – second place	2005 Incheon	400 m hurdles
Bronze medal – third place	2000 Jakarta	400 m hurdles

Noraseela Mohd Khalid (born 27 September 1979) is a Malaysian athlete who specialises in the 400 metres hurdles. Her personal best is 56.02 seconds, achieved in June 2006 in Regensburg.

She won the bronze medal at the 2000 Asian Championships, finished sixth at the 2003 Summer Universiade, fourth at the 2003 Asian Championships, won the silver medal at the 2005 Asian Championships, finished sixth at the 2006 Commonwealth Games and won the bronze medal at the 2006 Asian Games. She also competed at the World Championships in 2001 and 2005 without reaching the final.

== Achievements ==
Year	Competition	Venue	Position	Event	Notes
1999	Universiade	Palma de Mallorca, Spain	22nd (h)	100 m hurdles	14.80
1999	Universiade	Palma de Mallorca, Spain	22nd (h)	400 m hurdles	60.74
1999	Southeast Asian Games	Bandar Seri Begawan, Brunei	1st	400 m hurdles	58.70
2000	Asian Championships	Jakarta, Indonesia	3rd	400 m hurdles	59.62
2001	World Championships	Edmonton, Alberta	24th (h)	400 m hurdles	59.12
2001	Southeast Asian Games	Kuala Lumpur, Malaysia	2nd	400 m hurdles	58.93
2002	Asian Championships	Colombo, Sri Lanka	6th	400 m hurdles	59.85
2003	Universiade	Daegu, South Korea	6th	400 m hurdles	56.90
2003	Asian Championships	Manila, Philippines	4th	400 m hurdles	57.28
2003	Southeast Asian Games	Hanoi, Vietnam	1st	400 m hurdles	57.62
2005	World Championships	Helsinki, Finland	23rd (h)	400 m hurdles	57.58
2005	Asian Championships	Incheon, South Korea	2nd	400 m hurdles	56.39
2006	Asian Games	Doha, Qatar	3rd	400 m hurdles	56.85
2009	Asian Championships	Guangzhou, China	2nd	400 m hurdles	57.15
2009	Southeast Asian Games	Vientiane, Laos	3rd	400 m	54.32
2009	Southeast Asian Games	Vientiane, Laos	1st	400 m hurdles	56.99
2010	Asian Games	Guangzhou, China	5th	400 m hurdles	57.22
2011	Southeast Asian Games	Palembang, Indonesia	1st	400 m hurdles	57.41
2012	Olympic Games	London, United Kingdom	39th (h)	400 m hurdles	60.16
