= Anoma Sooriyaarachchi =

Sri Lankan track and field athlete

Personal information
- Nationality: Sri Lankan British, Welsh
- Citizenship: British
- Born: 21 March 1984 (age 42)
- Education: Southlands College, Galle

Sport
- Country: Sri Lanka/United Kingdom/Wales
- Sport: Athletics
- Event(s): long jump, 100m, 200m, 4×100m relay

Anoma Sooriyaarachchi, also spelt as either as Anoma Sooriyarachchi or Anoma Suriyaarachchi, (Sinhala: අනෝමා සූරීයාරාච්චි) (born 21 March 1981) is a Sri Lankan-based track and field athlete who competes in women's 100m, 200m, 4 × 100 m relay and long jump events. She is a Sri Lankan national and Asian record holder in women's 100-yard dash event. She obtained the British citizenship during her early career which was at the half way mark as a track and field athlete and now currently lives in Wales.

== Career ==
After completing her education from the Southlands College, she pursued her career in athletics and took part at the 1998 Asian Junior Athletics Championships. She also made her Asian Games debut in the same year representing Sri Lanka and competed in the women's long jump event. Anoma competed at her maiden World Athletics Championships in 2001. She also featured in Sri Lankan squads for the 2002 Asian Games and 2002 Asian Athletics Championships.

However she felt displeasure on the selectors over her exclusion from the Sri Lankan contingent for the 2002 Commonwealth Games and left the country to pursue her athletics career in Great Britain. Sri Lankan selection committee later convinced her to take part at the 2006 Asian Games while she was in UK to compete in the 4 × 100 m relay category as a replacement for sprinter Jani Chathurangani at that time who was banned from participating in international competitions due to doping scandal. However Anoma didn't participate at the event.

On 31 May 2011, during the 2011 Golden Spike Ostrava competition, she set Sri Lankan and Asian records in the women's 100yard category which was held in Czech Republic.
