= Rachita Mistry =

Indian sprinter

Personal information
- Nationality: Indian
- Born: Rachita Panda; 4 March 1974 (age 52) Rourkela, Odisha, India
- Height: 1.64 m (5 ft 4 1/2 in)
- Weight: 55 kg (121 lb; 8.7 st)

Sport
- Country: India
- Sport: Running
- Events: 100 metres, 200 metres
- Club: Indian Railways
- Retired: Yes

Achievements and titles
- Personal bests: 100 m: 11.26 (Thiruvananthapuram 2000); 200 m: 23.10 (Chennai 2000)
Medal record
Women's athletics
Representing India
Asian Games
Bronze medal – third place	1998 Bangkok	100 m
Asian Championships
Gold medal – first place	1998 Fukuoka	4x100 m
Bronze medal – third place	1993 Manila	4×100 m
Silver medal – second place	2000 Jakarta	4×100 m
Bronze medal – third place	2000 Jakarta	100 m

Rachita Mistry (née Panda, born 4 March 1974) is an Indian former sprinter from Odisha.

== Career ==
She held the 100 metres national record of 11.38 seconds set at the National Circuit Athletic Meet held in Thiruvananthapuram on 12 August 2000 for 13 years until it was bettered in 2013 by Merlin K. Joseph. Rachita set her personal best time of 11.26 s for 100 metres in Bangalore on 5 July 2001 and in the process she broke P. T. Usha's long standing mark of 11.39 s set during the 1985 Asian Championships in Athletics in Jakarta. However, following some controversies, the Amateur Athletic Federation of India (AAFI) did not ratify the national record on the ground that no dope tests had been carried out during the meet. AAIF, however, clarified that the performances of the athletes who set the National record during the 2000 National Circuit Meet would be allowed to stand as their personal bests.

Rachita represented India in 4 x 100 metres relay together with P. T. Usha, E. B. Shyla, and Saraswati Saha at the 1998 Asian Championships in Athletics where her team won the gold medal on way to setting the current national record of 44.43 s. Later in the 4 x 100 metres relay at 2000 Sydney Olympics her team - consisting of V. Jayalakshmi, Vinita Tripathi, and Saraswati Saha - clocked a time of 45.20 s in the first round. The team finished last in their heats.

Rachita is also a former National record holder in the 200 metre sprint. She set the 200 m record on 31 July 2000, at Chennai, with a run of 23.10 seconds. In doing so, she broke the previous record held by P. T. Usha. Rachita's 200 metres record was later replaced by Saraswati Saha in August 2002. In 1998, she was conferred the Arjuna Award for her contribution to the Indian athletics.

== Achievements ==
Year	Competition	Venue	Position	Notes
Representing India
1998	Asian Championships	Fukuoka, Japan	1st	4 × 100 m NR
2000	Asian Championships	Jakarta, Indonesia	3rd	100 m

== National titles ==
- All-India Open National Championships
  - 100 m: 1998
- All-India Inter State Championships
  - 100 m: 1998, 2000
  - 200 m: 2000
- Indian National Games
  - 100 m: 1997
