= Bo Fanfang =

Chinese sprinter (born 1978)

Personal information
- Native name: 卜範芳
- Nationality: Chinese
- Born: 10 February 1978 (age 47) Yishui, China

Sport
- Sport: Sprinting
- Event: 400 metres

Bo Fanfang (Chinese: 卜範芳; born 10 February 1978) is a Chinese sprinter. She competed in the women's 400 metres at the 2004 Summer Olympics.
