= Wang Yuanping =

Chinese middle-distance runner

Medal record

Women's athletics

Representing China

Asian Championships
Silver medal – second place	2000 Jakarta	800 m

Wang Yuanping (born 8 December 1976) is a retired Chinese athlete who specialised in the 800 metres. She won several medals at the regional level.

Her personal bests in the event are 2:00.63 seconds outdoors (Jinzhou 2000) and 2:03.41 seconds indoors (Yokohama 2004).

== Competition record ==
Year	Competition	Venue	Position	Event	Notes
Representing China
1998	Asian Games	Bangkok, Thailand	3rd	800 m	2:04.45
2000	Asian Championships	Jakarta, Indonesia	2nd	800 m	2:04.11
2001	World Indoor Championships	Lisbon, Portugal	19th (h)	800 m	2:09.80
2001	East Asian Games	Osaka, Japan	1st	800 m	2:03.21
2001	Universiade	Beijing, China	15th (sf)	800 m	2:06.77
2002	Asian Games	Busan, South Korea	4th	800 m	2:05.13
2003	Afro-Asian Games	Hyderabad, India	2nd	800 m	2:04.36
