= Supavadee Khawpeag =

Thai sprinter

Personal information
- Nationality: Thai
- Born: 17 July 1976 (age 49)

Sport
- Sport: Sprinting
- Event: 4 × 100 metres relay
Medal record
Women's athletics
Representing Thailand
Asian Championships
Gold medal – first place	2007 Amman	4×100 m

Supavadee Khawpeag (born 17 July 1976) is a Thai sprinter. She competed in the women's 4 × 100 metres relay at the 2000 Summer Olympics.
