= Nimmi de Zoysa =

Sri Lankan sprinter

Nimmi de Zoysa Oly
Personal information
- Nationality: Sri Lankan
- Born: 19 November 1975 (age 50)

Sport
- Sport: Sprinting
- Event(s): 4 × 100 metres relay, 4 × 400 metres relay, 400 metres, 200 metres, 100 metres
Medal record
Women's athletics
Representing Sri Lanka
Asian Championships
Gold medal – first place	2000 Jakarta	4×100 m

S. Nimmi de Zoysa Oly (born 19 November 1975) is a Sri Lankan former sprinter. She competed in the women's 4 × 100 metres relay at the 2000 Summer Olympics. She's also a gold medalist in the women's 4 × 100 metres relay at the 2000 Asian Championships in Jakarta.
