= Lyubov Perepelova =

Uzbekistani sprinter (born 1979)

Personal information
- Born: Lyubov Gennadyevna Perepelova; February 26, 1979 (age 47) Tashkent, Uzbek SSR, Soviet Union (now Uzbekistan)
- Height: 1.61 m (5 ft 3 1/2 in)
- Weight: 54 kg (119 lb)

Sport
- Country: Uzbekistan
- Sport: Athletics
- Event: sprinter
Medal record
Women's athletics
Representing Uzbekistan
Asian Games
Silver medal – second place	2002 Busan	100 m
Bronze medal – third place	2002 Busan	4×100 m
Asian Championships
Gold medal – first place	2000 Jakarta	100 m
Gold medal – first place	2003 Manila	100 m
Gold medal – first place	2003 Manila	200 m
Silver medal – second place	2000 Jakarta	200 m
Silver medal – second place	2002 Colombo	200 m
Bronze medal – third place	2002 Colombo	100 m

Lyubov Gennadiyevna Perepelova (Russian: Любовь Геннадьевна Перепелова; born 26 February 1979) is an Uzbekistani sprinter who specializes in the 100 and 200 metres.

From July 2005 to July 2007 she was suspended due to a doping offense.

== Achievements ==
Year	Competition	Venue	Position	Event	Notes
Representing Uzbekistan
1998	World Junior Championships	Annecy, France	16th (sf)	100m	12.15 (wind: +0.7 m/s)
1998	World Junior Championships	Annecy, France	22nd (qf)	200m	24.36 (wind: +0.7 m/s)
2000	Asian Championships	Jakarta, Indonesia	1st	100 m	11.31
2000	Asian Championships	Jakarta, Indonesia	2nd	200 m	23.30
2002	Asian Games	Busan, South Korea	2nd	100 m	11.38
2002	Asian Games	Busan, South Korea	3rd	4 × 100 m relay	44.32
2002	Asian Championships	Colombo, Sri Lanka	3rd	100 m	11.60
2002	Asian Championships	Colombo, Sri Lanka	2nd	200 m	23.76
2003	Asian Championships	Manila, Philippines	1st	100 m	11.43
2003	Asian Championships	Manila, Philippines	1st	200 m	23.11
2003	Afro-Asian Games	Hyderabad, India	2nd	100 m	11.49 w

=== Personal bests ===
- 60 metres - 7.31 s (2005)
- 100 metres - 11.04 s (2000)
- 200 metres - 22.72 s (2000)
