= Han Qing =

Chinese track and field athlete (born 1970)

Medal record

Women's athletics

Representing China

Asian Games
Gold medal – first place	1990 Beijing	200 m

Asian Championships
Gold medal – first place	1993 Manila	4×400 m

Han Qing (Chinese: 韩青; born March 14 1970) is a Chinese former track and field athlete who competed in the 200 metres and 400 metres hurdles. Her personal best of 53.96 seconds in the hurdles is an Asian record, shared with Song Yinglan. She was the Asian Games champion over 200 m in 1990 and initially won the 400 m hurdles gold medal in 1994.

== Career ==
Han had a rapid rise in the 1990 season, going from a relatively unknown athlete to the 200 m gold medallist at the 1990 Asian Games in Beijing, breaking the Asian Games record with a time of 23.42 seconds and defeating the more experienced Wang Huei-chen and Tian Yumei (who was the 100 m champion). This made her the first Chinese of either sex to win the Asian Games title over that distance, and as of 2014 she remains the only one to have done so.

She continued in that discipline at the 1993 East Asian Games held in Shanghai, but managed only third place behind Wang and fellow Chinese Chen Zhaojing. She switched to compete in the 400 m hurdles that season and the change proved successful as at the 7th Chinese National Games she broke the Asian record for the event with her winning time of 53.96 seconds. This was part of a slew of record-breaking performances by Chinese women at the competition, which saw world or Asian records set in all the women's track events bar the 4×100 m relay. The time ranked her fifth in the global seasonal rankings for 1993.

She entered the 1994 Asian Games as the continent's leading female hurdler. In her first major championship outside Japan she claimed the gold medal with a time of 54.74 seconds – an Asian Games record. It placed her fourth on time amongst athletes that season. However, this mark was not to stand as she was disqualified after giving a urine test that was positive for the banned substance Dihydrotestosterone. She was one of eleven Chinese athletes to fail a drugs test at the Asian Games that year, eight of them being gold medallists. This was the first time a winner of an athletics medal had been disqualified for doping at the Asian Games. Marking a toughening of doping sanctions by the Chinese governing body, she was banned from the sport for four years.

This effectively marked the end of her career as she did not return to competition. As of 2015, her personal best of 53.96 seconds is still the Asian record for the event, although this is now shared with Song Yinglan, who equalled the time during her win at the 2001 Chinese National Games.

== National titles ==
- National Games of the People's Republic of China
  - 400 m hurdles: 1993

== International competitions ==
Year	Competition	Venue	Position	Event	Notes
1990	Asian Games	Beijing, China	1st	200 m	23.42 GR
1993	East Asian Games	Shanghai, China	3rd	200 m	23.76
1994	Asian Games	Hiroshima, Japan	1st	400 m hurdles	54.74 DQ

== See also ==
- List of doping cases in athletics
