= Jincy Phillip =

Indian sprinter

Personal information
- Nationality: Indian
- Born: 12 April 1977 (age 49)

Sport
- Sport: Sprinting
- Event: 4 × 400 metres relay
Medal record
Women's athletics
Representing India
Asian Championships
Gold medal – first place	2000 Jakarta	4×400 m

Jincy Phillip (born 12 April 1977) is an Indian sprinter. She competed in the women's 4 × 400 metres relay at the 2000 Summer Olympics. She also won a gold and silver medal, at the 2002 and the 1998 Asian Games respectively.
