= Damayanthi Dharsha =

Sri Lankan sprinter

Deshabandu Damayanthi Dharsha
Personal information
- Native name: දමයන්ති දර්ශා
- Full name: Damayanthi Dharsha-Kobalavithanage
- Nationality: Sri Lankan
- Born: February 13, 1975 (age 51) Panadura, Sri Lanka

Sport
- Country: Sri Lanka
- Sport: Track and field
- Event: Sprint
- Retired: 2007

Achievements and titles
- Personal best(s): 200 m: 22.48 (Bangkok 1998); 400 m: 51.05 (Jakarta 2000)
Medal record
Women's athletics
Representing Sri Lanka
Event	1st	2nd	3rd
Asian Games	3	0	1
Asian Championships	4	1	0
Total	7	1	1
Event	1st	2nd	3rd
200 m	3	1	1
400 m	4	0	0
Asian Games
Gold medal – first place	1998 Fukuoka	400 m
Gold medal – first place	1998 Bangkok	200 m
Gold medal – first place	2002 Busan	400 m
Bronze medal – third place	1994 Hiroshima	200 m
Asian Championships
Gold medal – first place	1998 Bangkok	400 m
Gold medal – first place	2000 Jakarta	200 m
Gold medal – first place	2000 Jakarta	400 m
Gold medal – first place	2000 Jakarta	4×100 m
Gold medal – first place	2005 Busan	200 m
Silver medal – second place	1993 Manila	200 m
Bronze medal – third place	2002 Colombo	4×400 m
- Updated on 10 November 2015

Deshabandu Kobala Vithanage Damayanthi Dharsha-Kobalavithanage (born 13 February 1975) is a retired Sri Lankan athlete who competed in the 200 and 400 metres race events. She is the current Asian Games record holder in women's 200m event and current Asian Athletics Championships record holder in women's 400m event as well as national record holder in women's 400m. She is regarded as one of the greatest track and field athletes to have represented Sri Lanka at international level alongside her teammate Susanthika Jayasinghe. She is also regarded as the most successful Sri Lankan athlete at the Asian Games with a medal haul of four medals including three gold medals and became the first Sri Lankan female athlete to clinch three Asian Games gold medals. She represented Sri Lanka at the Olympics on three occasions in 1992, 2000 and 2004. She also represented Sri Lanka at the Commonwealth Games on four occasions in 1994, 1998, 2002 and 2006 as well as at the South Asian Games on four occasions.

She now has migrated and lives in Melbourne, Australia.

== Biography ==
Dharsha was born on 13 February 1975 in Panadura. However, she along with her family moved to her father's hometown in Ampara at her young age. She pursued her primary education at the Ampara Bandaranaike Maha Vidyalaya for a brief period of time. She along with her family returned to Panadura mainly due to the threat of LTTE which emerged in 1983 and she initially attended St. John's College for one year before transferring to Panadura Balika Maha Vidyalaya. She started competing in track and field events since the age of 13 in 1988 after joining the Panadura Balika Maha Vidyalaya. She was coached by former Sri Lankan Olympian Sunil Gunawardene. She also obtained scholarship to join the Ladies' College, Colombo in 1991 due to her success in athletics at the school level competitions. She married Eranda Siriwardane in 2003 and has three children.

== Career ==
She gained her first international experience at the 1991 Malaysian Open. She made an initial impact at just 16 years when she won the 100 metres gold medal at the 1991 South Asian Games in Colombo with a new record. She broke into the limelight by winning the 100 metre gold at the Asian Junior Championships in the same year. She also eventually won the national titles in both women's 100m and 200m events at the 1991 National Athletics Championships.

She was chosen to represent Sri Lanka as a first-choice athlete at the 1992 Summer Olympics at the age of 17 and became the youngest Sri Lankan to compete at the Olympics. She also became the first Sri Lankan schoolgirl to participate in the Olympics. The 1992 Barcelona Olympics also marked her maiden Olympic appearance and she competed in the women's 100m and 200m events. Following the 1992 Olympics, she participated in an invitational athletics meet in Malaysia and secured gold medals in 100m and 200m events in the competition. In the same year, she received the Duncan White Trophy.

In 1993, she attended a special training session in Australia. She claimed her first international medal during the 1993 Asian Athletics Championships securing a silver medal in the 200m event with a timing of 23.29 seconds. She claimed gold medal in the 100m event at the 1994 Asian Junior Athletics Championships and set a new Asian Junior Championships record in the women's 100m event with a timing of 11.42 seconds. During the same Asian Junior Championships, she claimed silver medal in the women's 200m event and finished just behind Susanthika Jayasinghe.

She won the bronze medal in the 200 metres behind Chinese Taipei's Wang Huei-Chen and teammate Susanthika Jayasinghe at the 1994 Asian Games in Hiroshima. That was the beginning of a dominant period for Sri Lanka in women's sprinting with Jayasinghe and Darsha seriously challenging the Chinese.

She had a remarkable run in 1998 claiming three gold medals at the Asian regional competitions. She claimed her first gold medal in her career in the women's 400m event at the 1998 Asian Athletics Championships and followed it up with gold medals in women's 200m and 400m events at the 1998 Asian Games. At the 1998 Asian Games, she also set Asian Games record in women's 200m with a new record of 22.48 seconds.

She made her second appearance at the Olympics in her athletic career in 2000 after failing to qualify for the 1996 Olympics. She was also the flag bearer for Sri Lanka during the opening ceremony of the 2000 Sydney Olympics at the age of 25. She also held the record for being the youngest ever Sri Lankan flag bearer at the Olympics until it was surpassed by Milka Gehani at the 2020 Summer Olympics. She defended her 400m title at the 2000 Asian Athletics Championships with a new Asian Championship record of 51.05 seconds and also claimed gold medal in the 200m event during the Asian Championships in the same year. She also successfully defended her 400m gold medal at the 2002 Asian Games in Busan. She claimed bronze medal in the women's 4 × 400 m relay at the 2002 Asian Athletics Championships. In addition, she also joined the MAS Holdings in 2003 as a senior HR executive.

She made her third and final Olympic appearance at the 2004 Summer Olympics. Her last international appearance for Sri Lanka came during the 2006 Commonwealth Games. In July 2007, Dharsha announced her retirement from athletics.

She represented Sri Lanka along with former veteran cricketer Mahela Jayawardene in a ten-team celebrity street cricket game during the opening ceremony of the 2019 Cricket World Cup.

In 2021, she contested in the elections for the post of Vice President of Sri Lanka Athletics Association and was elected as the Vice President of Sri Lanka Athletics Association. She also became the first female Vice President of SLA and was appointed as the head of the women's sub committee of Technical Officials and Media.

== International competitions ==
Year	Competition	Venue	Position	Event	Notes
Representing Sri Lanka
1992	Olympic Games	Barcelona, Spain	38th (h)	100 m	11.88
1992	Olympic Games	Barcelona, Spain	29th (qf)	200 m	23.89
1993	Asian Championships	Manila, Philippines	2nd	200 m	23.29
1994	Asian Games	Hiroshima, Japan	3rd	200 m	23.61
1995	World Championships	Edmonton, Canada	38th (h)	100 m	11.65
1995	World Championships	Edmonton, Canada	28th (qf)	200 m	23.45
1997	World Championships	Athens, Greece	22nd (qf)	400 m	53.49
1998	Asian Championships	Fukuoka, Japan	1st	400 m	51.23
1998	Commonwealth Games	Kuala Lumpur, Malaysia	4th	400 m	51.06
1998	Asian Games	Bangkok, Thailand	1st	200 m	22.48
1998	Asian Games	Bangkok, Thailand	1st	400 m	51.57
1998	Asian Games	Bangkok, Thailand	6th	4 × 400 m relay	3:40.05
1999	World Championships	Seville, Spain	37th (h)	200 m	23.57
1999	World Championships	Seville, Spain	31st (qf)	200 m	53.33
2000	Asian Championships	Jakarta, Indonesia	1st	200 m	22.84
2000	Asian Championships	Jakarta, Indonesia	1st	400 m	51.05
2000	Olympic Games	Sydney, Australia	23rd (qf)	400 m	52.35
2001	World Indoor Championships	Lisbon, Portugal	12th (sf)	200 m	24.00
2001	World Indoor Championships	Lisbon, Portugal	–	400 m	DNF
2001	World Championships	Edmonton, Canada	10th (sf)	200 m	22.88
2001	World Championships	Edmonton, Canada	19th (sf)	400 m	51.83
2001	World Championships	Edmonton, Canada	8th (h)	4 × 100 m relay	43.89
2002	Commonwealth Games	Manchester, United Kingdom	14th (sf)	200 m	24.18
2002	Commonwealth Games	Manchester, United Kingdom	22nd (sf)	400 m	53.91
2002	Commonwealth Games	Manchester, United Kingdom	6th (f)	4 × 100 m relay	44.25
2002	Asian Championships	Colombo, Sri Lanka	3rd	4 × 400 m relay	3:42.71
2002	Asian Games	Busan, South Korea	1st	400 m	51.13
2003	World Indoor Championships	Birmingham, United Kingdom	24th (h)	400 m	54.61
2003	Asian Championships	Manila, Philippines	3rd (h)	200 m	24.13
2004	Olympic Games	Athens, Greece	38th (h)	400 m	54.58
2005	Asian Championships	Incheon, South Korea	1st	200 m	23.21
2006	Commonwealth Games	Melbourne, Australia	16th (sf)	200 m	24.22
