= Baek Seung-do =

South Korean runner (born 1968)

Personal information
- Nationality: South Korean
- Born: 16 June 1968 (age 58)

Sport
- Sport: Long-distance running
- Event: Marathon
Medal record
Men's athletics
Representing South Korea
Asian Games
Bronze medal – third place	1998 Bangkok	5000m
Asian Championships
Gold medal – first place	1998 Fukuoka	10,000 m
Bronze medal – third place	1993 Manila	10,000 m

Baek Seung-do (born 16 June 1968) is a South Korean long-distance runner. He competed in the men's marathon at the 2000 Summer Olympics.

Baek's finish of 5th at the 2000 Tokyo Marathon was described in Korean media as a "miracle". He ran 2:08:49 to break his eight-year-old personal best by two minutes.
