= Vinita Tripathi =

Indian athlete

Personal information
- Nationality: Indian
- Born: 15 October 1980 (age 45)

Sport
- Sport: Sprinting
- Event: 4 × 100 metres relay
Medal record
Women's athletics
Representing India
Asian Championships
Silver medal – second place	2000 Jakarta	4×100 m

Vinita Tripathi (born 15 October 1980) is an Indian sprinter. She competed in the women's 4 × 100 metres relay at the 2000 Summer Olympics.
