= K. M. Beenamol =

Indian athlete

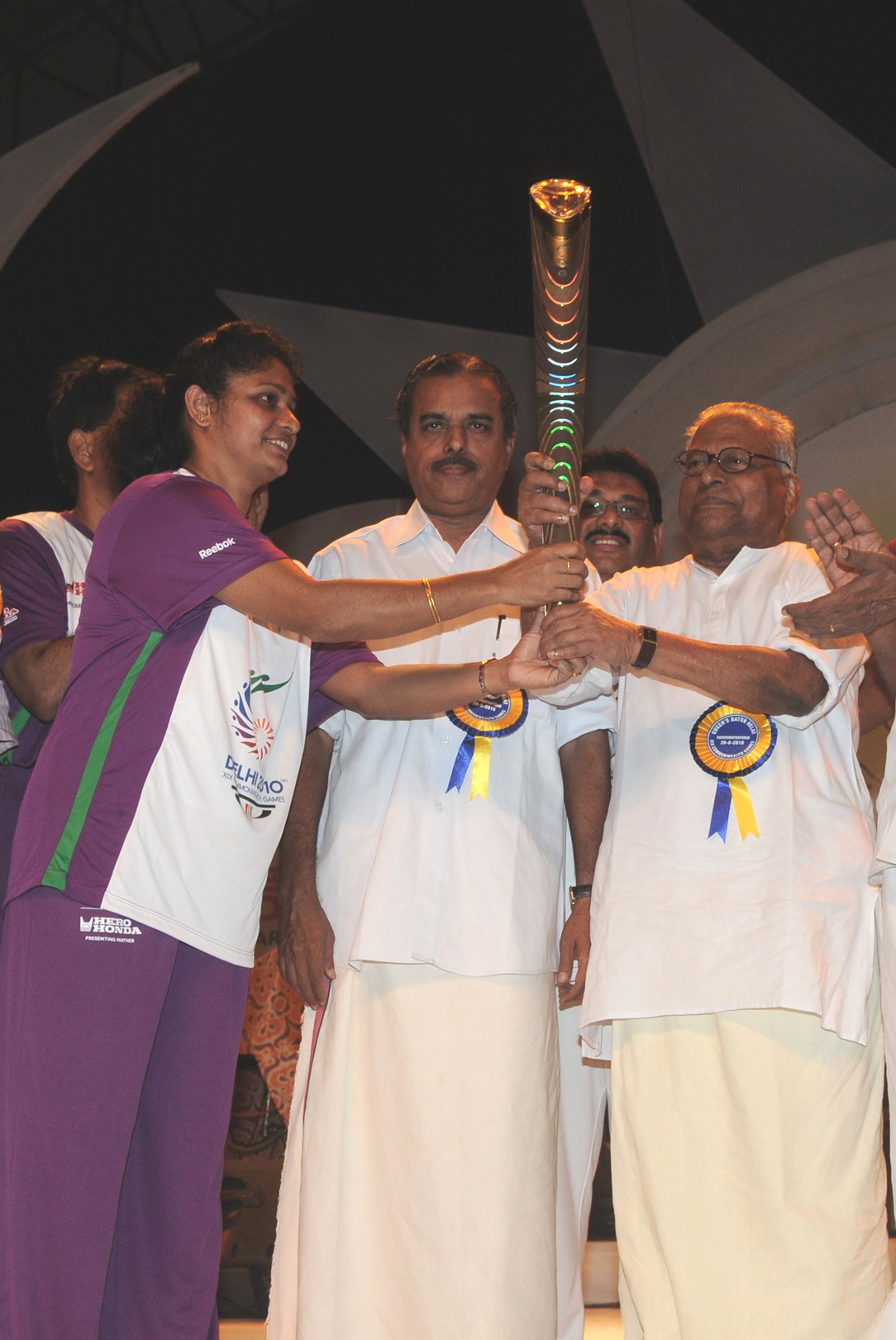
- Beenamol handing over the Queen's Baton to the Chief Minister of Kerala in 2010

Personal information
- Full name: Kalayathumkuzhi Mathews Beenamol
- National team: India
- Born: 15 August 1975 (age 51) Kombodinjal, Idukki district, Kerala, India
- Years active: 1990–2004
- Employer: Indian Railways
- Height: 163 cm (5 ft 4 in)
- Weight: 50 kg (110 lb)
- Spouse: Dr. Vivek George

Sport
- Country: India
- Sport: Track and field
- Events: Sprint (400 m); Middle-distance (800 m); Relay (4 × 400 m)
- Coached by: Raju Paul

Achievements and titles
- Personal bests: 400 m: 51.21 (Kyiv, 2000); 800 m: 2:02.01 (New Delhi, 2002); 4 × 400 m relay: 3:26.89 (Athens, 2004) NR
Medal record
Women's athletics
Representing India
Asian Athletics Championships
Gold medal – first place	2000 Jakarta	4 × 400 m relay
Silver medal – second place	2000 Jakarta	400 m
Asian Games
Gold medal – first place	2002 Busan	800 m
Gold medal – first place	2002 Busan	4 × 400 m relay
Silver medal – second place	2002 Busan	400 m
Asian Junior Athletics Championships
Gold medal – first place	1992 New Delhi	800 m
Gold medal – first place	1992 New Delhi	4 × 400 m relay
Silver medal – second place	1992 New Delhi	400 m
Silver medal – second place	1994 Jakarta	800 m
Bronze medal – third place	1994 Jakarta	400 m
Bronze medal – third place	1994 Jakarta	4×400 m relay

Kalayathumkuzhi Mathews Beenamol, popularly known as K. M. Beenamol (born 15 August 1975, from Kombodinjal, Idukki district, Kerala) is an Indian international athlete.

== Professional athletics career ==
Beenamol and her brother K. M. Binu became the first Indian siblings to win medals in a major international competition. Binu won a silver medal in men's 800m race.

=== Olympics ===
It was during 2000 Summer Olympics, Beenamol was largely unknown, until she became the third Indian woman to reach an Olympic semi-final since P. T. Usha and Shiny Wilson, who achieved almost the same feat in 400m Hurdles in 800m respectively in the 1984 Summer Olympics in Los Angeles.

=== Asian games ===
She won the gold medal in women's 800m and the 4 × 400 m women's relay in the 2002 Asian Games held at Busan.

== Achievements ==
Year	Competition	Venue	Position	Event	Notes
2000	Asian Championships	Jakarta, Indonesia	Gold	4 × 400 m relay	3:31.54
2000	Asian Championships	Jakarta, Indonesia	Silver	400 m	51.41
2002	Asian Games	Busan, South Korea	Gold	800 m	2:04.17
2002	Asian Games	Busan, South Korea	Gold	4 × 400 m relay	3:30.84
2004	Olympic Games	Athens, Greece	6th	4 × 400 m relay	3:26.89 NR

== Awards ==
Beenamol was conferred Arjuna Award in 2000 for her exemplary achievement in her athletic career. She is also the joint winner of India's highest sporting honour, the Rajiv Gandhi Khel Ratna award in the year 2002–2003 along with Anjali Ved Pathak Bhagwat. In 2004, she was awarded the Padma Shri.

== Personal life ==
K. M. Beenamol is married to Vivek George, a pathologist, and has 2 children, Ashwin and Haile (named after Ethiopian legend Haile Gebrselassie).

== See also ==
- List of Kerala Olympians
