= Rosa Kutty =

Indian athlete

Personal information
- Born: 1964 (age 61–62)
- Occupation: athlete
Medal record
Women's athletics
Representing India
Asian Games
Silver medal – second place	1998 Bangkok	800 m
Asian Championships
Gold medal – first place	2000 Jakarta	4×400 m
Silver medal – second place	1989 New Delhi	800 m
Silver medal – second place	1995 Jakarta	4×400 m
Silver medal – second place	1998 Fukuoka	4×400 m
Bronze medal – third place	2000 Jakarta	800 m

Rosa Kutty (born 1964) is a former Indian woman athlete who participated in 1996 and 2000 Olympics in 4x 400 relay race. She won silver medal in 1998 Asian Games in 800 mt race. She is from Aayavana, Muvattupuzha in Kerala and now live in Bangalore in Karnataka. She works as Sports Officer in the Bangalore Division of South Western Railways She got Arjuna award for her achievements in 1994.

== Medals ==
- Silver medal in 800m at Asian Meet, Delhi, 1989
- Bronze in 800m at Beijing Asiad
- Silver at Bangkok Asiad, 1998
