= Yan Jiankui =

Chinese sprinter (born 1976)

Medal record

Women's athletics

Representing China

Asian Championships
Gold medal – first place	1998 Fukuoka	100 m
Gold medal – first place	1998 Fukuoka	200 m
Gold medal – first place	2002 Colombo	4×100 m
Bronze medal – third place	2000 Jakarta	4×100 m
Bronze medal – third place	2002 Colombo	200 m

Yan Jiankui (born 19 March 1976) is a retired female sprinter from PR China. She competed in the 100 metres and the 200 metres at the 1996 Summer Olympics.

In 1998 she won both the 100 metres and 200 metres the Asian Championships and as well as a bronze medal in the 200 m at the Asian Games. She was selected to represent Asia at the 1998 World Cup, but finished eighth and last in both events. Later she won a bronze medal in the 200 m at the 2002 Asian Championships.

She also competed at the 1997 World Indoor Championships and the 1997 World Championships without reaching the final. However, she finished eighth at the 1997 World Championships with the 4 x 100 metres relay team.

Her personal best times were both achieved in 1998. She ran the 100 m in 11.22 seconds in Beijing and the 200 m in 22.85 seconds in Shijiazhuang.

== Achievements ==
Year	Competition	Venue	Position	Notes
Representing China
1997	East Asian Games	Busan, South Korea	1st	200 m
1998	Asian Championships	Fukuoka, Japan	1st	100 m
1998	Asian Championships	Fukuoka, Japan	1st	200 m
2001	East Asian Games	Osaka, Japan	2nd	200 m
2001	East Asian Games	Osaka, Japan	1st	4 × 400 m relay
