= 2000 Asian Athletics Championships =

2000 Asian Championships
- Dates: 28–31 August
- Host city: Jakarta, Indonesia
- Events: 43
- Participation: 441 athletes from 37 nations

The 13th Asian Athletics Championships were held in Jakarta, Indonesia in late August 2000.

== Results ==
=== Men ===
Event	Gold		Silver		Bronze	
100 metres	Jamal Al-Saffar; Saudi Arabia	10.32	Anil Kumar Prakash; India	10.35	Yin Hanzhao; China	10.36
200 metres	Masahiko Fukunaga; Japan	20.78	Sittichai Suwonprateep; Thailand	20.79	Mohammed Al-Houti; Oman	20.81
400 metres	Ibrahim Ismail Muftah; Qatar	44.66	Hamdan Obah Al-Bishi; Saudi Arabia	45.32	Xu Zizhou; China	45.55
800 metres	Mehdi Jelodarzadeh; Iran	1:49.80	Kim Soon-hyung; South Korea	1:50.06	Lee Jae-Hun; South Korea	1:50.35
1500 metres	Mohammed Sulaiman; Qatar	3:52.47	Ali Abu Bakr Kamal; Qatar	3:52.64	Sun Wenli; China	3:52.94
5000 metres	Ahmed Ibrahim Warsama; Qatar	13:53.10	Gong Ke; China	14:04.61	Mohammed Sulaiman; Qatar	14:10.79
10,000 metres	Ahmed Ibrahim Warsama; Qatar	29:53.00	Gulab Chand; India	30:03.75	Gong Ke; China	30:05.11
3000 metres steeplechase	Khamis Seif Abdullah; Qatar	8:47.33	Hussain Ali Al-Asmari; Saudi Arabia	8:52.85	Hamid Sajjadi; Iran	8:54.07
110 metres hurdles	Mubarak Ata Mubarak; Saudi Arabia	14.02	Shen Zhensheng; China	14.13	Park Tae-kyong; South Korea	14.16
400 metres hurdles	Hadi Soua'an Al-Somaily; Saudi Arabia	49.13	Harijan Ratnayake; Sri Lanka	49.44 NR	Zahr-el-Din El-Najem; Syria	49.67
4 × 100 metres relay	Thailand; Kongdech Natenee; Vissanu Sophanich; Ekkachai Janthana; Sittichai Suwonprateep	38.80 NR	Japan; Masahiko Fukunaga; Hirofumi Nakagawa; Kazuhiro Takahashi; Akihiro Yasui	39.18	Saudi Arabia; Mohamed Al-Yami; Mubarak Ata Mubarak; Salem Al-Yami; Jamal Al-Saffar	39.60
4 × 400 metres relay	Sri Lanka; Manura Lanka Perera; Vellasamy Ratnakumara; Ranga Wimalawansa; Rohan Pradeep Kumara	3:02.71 NR	India; Purukottam Ramachandran; Manoj Lal; Lijo David Thottan; Paramjit Singh	3:02.78	Saudi Arabia; Hamdan Odha Al-Bishi; Mohammed Al-Bishi; Hamed Hamadan Al-Bishi; Hadi Soua'an Al-Somaily	3:05.00
20 kilometres walk	Wu Ping; China	1:28:04	Hironori Kawai; Japan	1:29:13	Lee Dae-ro; South Korea	1:30:36
High jump	Yuriy Pakhlyayev; Kazakhstan	2.23	Wang Zhouzhou; China	2.23	Yoshiteru Kaihoko; Japan	2.19
Pole vault	Zhang Hongwei; China	5.40	Satoru Yasuda; Japan	5.20	Liu Yen-sung; Chinese Taipei	5.10
Long jump	Hussein Taher Al-Sabee; Saudi Arabia	8.33 CR	Sanjay Kumar Rai; India	8.03	Abdulrahman Al-Nubi; Qatar	8.01
Triple jump	Nattaporn Nomkanha; Thailand	16.53	Maksim Smetanin; Kyrgyzstan	16.33	Mouled Salem Al-Ahmadi; Saudi Arabia	16.24
Shot put	Shakti Singh; India	19.77 CR	Bilal Saad Mubarak; Qatar	19.23	Wen Jili; China	19.18
Discus throw	Anil Kumar; India	58.47	Abbas Samimi; Iran	58.27	Hridayanand Singh; India	56.96
Hammer throw	Wataru Ebihara; Japan	69.50	Ye Kuigang; China	69.48	Nasser Abdul Al-Jarallah; Kuwait	66.98
Javelin throw	Jagdish Kumar Bishnoi; India	76.81	Chu Ki-young; South Korea	75.27	Sun Shipeng; China	74.34
Decathlon	Hitoshi Maruono; Japan	7321 pts	Kim Kun-woo; South Korea	7031 pts	Kim Sang-ryong; North Korea	6970 pts
WR world record | AR area record | CR championship record | GR games record | NR national record | OR Olympic record | PB personal best | SB season best | WL world leading (in a given season)

=== Women ===
Event	Gold		Silver		Bronze	
100 metres	Lyubov Perepelova; Uzbekistan	11.31 CR	Saraswati Dey; India	11.40	Rachita Mistry; India	11.46
200 metres	Damayanthi Dharsha; Sri Lanka	22.84 CR	Lyubov Perepelova; Uzbekistan	23.30	Vinitha Tripathi; India	23.39
400 metres	Damayanthi Dharsha; Sri Lanka	51.05 CR/NR	K. Mathews Beenamol; India	51.41	Chen Yuxiang; China	52.81
800 metres	Lin Na; China	2:03.46	Wang Yuanping; China	2:04.11	Rosa Kutty; India	2:04.97
1500 metres	Wu Qingdong; China	4:17.82	Zhang Ling; China	4:18.31	Tokgo Sun-Ok; North Korea	4:20.04
5000 metres	Wu Qingdong; China	15:58.83	Naomi Sakashita; Japan	16:01.53	Supriati Sutono; Indonesia	16:03.85
10,000 metres	Supriati Sutono; Indonesia	33:47.24	Lashram Aruna Devi; India	34:31.15	Hong Myong-Hui; North Korea	35:27.50
100 metres hurdles	Su Yiping; China	12.99 CR	Trecia Roberts; Thailand	13.01	Anuradha Biswal; India	13.40
400 metres hurdles	Song Yinglan; China	57.73	Yasuko Igari; Japan	58.90	Noraseela Khalid; Malaysia	59.62
4 × 100 metres relay	Sri Lanka; Tamara Samandeepika; Pradeepa Herath; Nimmi de Zoysa; Damayanthi Darsha	44.23 NR	India; Anuradha Biswal; Vinita Tripathi; Saraswati Dey; Rachita Mistry	44.48	China; Su Yiping; Chen Yuxiang; Yan Jiankui; Chen Jueqin	44.80
4 × 400 metres relay	India; Paramjeet Kaur; Jincy Phillip; Rosa Kutty; K. M. Beenamol	3:31.54	Japan; Miho Sato; Kazue Kakinuma; Sakie Nobuoka; Makiko Yoshida	3:37.15	South Korea; Kim Sun-Young; Jeon Mi-Young; Kim Su-Kyong; Kim Dong-Hyun	3:48.29
10,000 metres walk	Li Hong; China	44:59.90 CR	Sun Chunfang; China	45:42.68	Yuan Yufang; Malaysia	46:12.66
High jump	Bobby Aloysius; India	1.83	Marina Korzhova; Kazakhstan	1.83	Tatyana Efimenko; Kyrgyzstan	1.80
Pole vault	Takayo Kondo; Japan	4.00 =CR	Chang Ko-Hsin; Chinese Taipei	3.90	Masumi Ono; Japan	3.80
Long jump	Yelena Bobrovskaya; Kyrgyzstan	6.66	Liang Shuyan; China	6.64	Maho Hanaoka; Japan	6.61
Triple jump	Yelena Parfenova; Kazakhstan	14.08	Miao Chunqing; China	14.01	Maho Hanaoka; Japan	13.67
Shot put	Nada Kawar; Jordan	17.46	Chinatsu Mori; Japan	16.38	Cho Jin-Sook; South Korea	15.38
Discus throw	Neelam Jaswant Singh; India	60.75	Cao Qi; China	58.71	Li Yanfeng; China	57.52
Hammer throw	Li Xiaoxue; China	59.02	Yuka Murofushi; Japan	58.64	Masumi Aya; Japan	55.97
Javelin throw	Lee Young-Sun; South Korea	55.78	Gurmeet Kaur; India	55.65	Zhang Li; China	55.07
Heptathlon	Svetlana Kazanina; Kazakhstan	6074 pts	Pramila Ganapathy; India	6016 pts	Irina Naumenko; Kazakhstan	5937 pts
WR world record | AR area record | CR championship record | GR games record | NR national record | OR Olympic record | PB personal best | SB season best | WL world leading (in a given season)

== Medal table ==
* Host nation (Indonesia)

Rank	Nation	Gold	Silver	Bronze	Total
1	China (CHN)	9	10	10	29
2	India (IND)	6	10	5	21
3	Qatar (QAT)	5	2	2	9
4	Japan (JPN)	4	8	5	17
5	Saudi Arabia (KSA)	4	2	3	9
6	Sri Lanka (SRI)	4	1	0	5
7	Kazakhstan (KAZ)	3	1	1	5
8	Thailand (THA)	2	2	0	4
9	South Korea (KOR)	1	3	5	9
10	Iran (IRI)	1	1	1	3
10	Kyrgyzstan (KGZ)	1	1	1	3
12	Uzbekistan (UZB)	1	1	0	2
13	Indonesia (INA)*	1	0	1	2
14	Jordan (JOR)	1	0	0	1
15	Chinese Taipei (TPE)	0	1	1	2
16	North Korea (PRK)	0	0	3	3
17	Malaysia (MAS)	0	0	2	2
18	Kuwait (KUW)	0	0	1	1
18	Oman (OMA)	0	0	1	1
18	Syria (SYR)	0	0	1	1
Totals (20 entries)		43	43	43	129

== Participation ==
- Bahrain (5)
- Bangladesh (4)
- Brunei (1)
- Cambodia (2)
- China (37)
- Chinese Taipei (16)
- Hong Kong (8)
- India (40)
- Indonesia (42)
- Iran (12)
- Japan (44)
- Jordan (4)
- Kazakhstan (14)
- Kuwait (8)
- Kyrgyzstan (7)
- Laos (2)
- Malaysia (9)
- Maldives (4)
- Mongolia (3)
- Nepal (3)
- North Korea (4)
- Oman (8)
- Pakistan (5)
- Palestine (2)
- Philippines (7)
- Qatar (24)
- Saudi Arabia (25)
- Singapore (7)
- South Korea (31)
- Sri Lanka (11)
- Syria (3)
- Tajikistan (3)
- Thailand (23)
- Turkmenistan (4)
- United Arab Emirates (7)
- Uzbekistan (4)
- Vietnam (8)

== See also ==
- 2000 in athletics (track and field)
