= Athletics at the 2006 Asian Games – Men's 4 × 100 metres relay =

Men's 4 × 100 metres relay at the 2006 Asian Games
- Venue: Khalifa International Stadium
- Dates: 11–12 December 2006
- Competitors: 42 from 10 nations

Medalists
gold medal	Thailand; Seksan Wongsala, Wachara Sondee, Ekkachai Janthana, Sittichai Suwonprateep
silver medal	Japan; Naoki Tsukahara, Shingo Suetsugu, Yusuke Omae, Shinji Takahira
bronze medal	China; Wen Yongyi, Pang Guibin, Yang Yaozu, Hu Kai

The men's 4 × 100 metres relay competition at the 2006 Asian Games in Doha, Qatar was held on 11 and 12 December 2006 at the Khalifa International Stadium.

== Schedule ==
All times are Arabia Standard Time (UTC+03:00)

Date	Time	Event
Monday, 11 December 2006	18:15	1st round
Tuesday, 12 December 2006	17:00	Final

== Records ==
Prior to this competition, the existing world, Asian and Games records were as follows.

World Record	United States; United States	37.40	Barcelona, Spain; Stuttgart, Germany	8 August 1992; 21 August 1993
Asian Record	Japan	38.31	Athens, Greece	9 August 1997
Games Record	Thailand	38.82	Busan, South Korea	13 October 2002

== Results ==
Legend

- DNF — Did not finish

=== 1st round ===
- Qualification: First 3 in each heat (Q) and the next 2 fastest (q) advance to the final.

==== Heat 1 ====
Rank	Team	Time	Notes
1	Thailand (THA); Sompote Suwannarangsri; Wachara Sondee; Ekkachai Janthana; Sittichai Suwonprateep	39.45	Q
2	China (CHN); Wen Yongyi; Pang Guibin; Yang Yaozu; Hu Kai	39.92	Q
3	Chinese Taipei (TPE); Liu Chih-hung; Liu Yuan-kai; Yi Wei-chen; Tsai Meng-lin	39.93	Q
4	Saudi Arabia (KSA); Mohammed Al-Fardan; Mubarak Ata Mubarak; Yahya Habeeb; Salem Al-Yami	40.33	q
5	Hong Kong (HKG); Leung Chun Wai; Lau Yu Leong; Tang Yik Chun; Chiang Wai Hung	40.63	q

==== Heat 2 ====
Rank	Team	Time	Notes
1	Japan (JPN); Naoki Tsukahara; Shingo Suetsugu; Yusuke Omae; Shinji Takahira	39.39	Q
2	Qatar (QAT); Sulaiman Hamid Osman; Khalid Al-Obaidli; Areef Ibrahim Badar; Al-Waleed Abdulla	40.09	Q
3	Oman (OMA); Fahad Al-Jabri; Juma Al-Jabri; Musabah Al-Masoudi; Yousuf Darwish	40.38	Q
4	South Korea (KOR); Jeon Duk-hyung; Lim Hee-nam; Lim Jae-youl; Park Pyung-hwan	40.92	
—	Kuwait (KUW); Jarah Al-Khadher; Fawaz Al-Shammari; Eisa Al-Youhah; Saleh Al-Haddad	DNF	

=== Final ===
Rank	Team	Time	Notes
1st place, gold medalist(s)	Thailand (THA); Seksan Wongsala; Wachara Sondee; Ekkachai Janthana; Sittichai Suwonprateep	39.21	
2nd place, silver medalist(s)	Japan (JPN); Naoki Tsukahara; Shingo Suetsugu; Yusuke Omae; Shinji Takahira	39.21	
3rd place, bronze medalist(s)	China (CHN); Wen Yongyi; Pang Guibin; Yang Yaozu; Hu Kai	39.62	
4	Chinese Taipei (TPE); Liu Chih-hung; Liu Yuan-kai; Yi Wei-chen; Tsai Meng-lin	39.99	
5	Qatar (QAT); Sulaiman Hamid Osman; Khalid Al-Obaidli; Areef Ibrahim Badar; Al-Waleed Abdulla	40.02	
6	Saudi Arabia (KSA); Salem Al-Yami; Mubarak Ata Mubarak; Yahya Habeeb; Yahya Al-Ghahes	40.18	
7	Oman (OMA); Fahad Al-Jabri; Juma Al-Jabri; Musabah Al-Masoudi; Yousuf Darwish	40.38	
8	Hong Kong (HKG); Leung Chun Wai; Lau Yu Leong; Tang Yik Chun; Chiang Wai Hung	40.84	
