= Athletics at the 2006 Asian Games – Men's 200 metres =

Men's 200 metres at the 2006 Asian Games
- Venue: Khalifa International Stadium
- Dates: 10–11 December 2006
- Competitors: 22 from 16 nations

Medalists
gold medal	Shingo Suetsugu	Japan
silver medal	Yang Yaozu	China
bronze medal	Shinji Takahira	Japan

The men's 200 metres competition at the 2006 Asian Games in Doha, Qatar was held on 10 and 11 December 2006 at the Khalifa International Stadium.

== Schedule ==
All times are Arabia Standard Time (UTC+03:00)

Date	Time	Event
Sunday, 10 December 2006	19:15	1st round
Monday, 11 December 2006	16:20	Final

== Records ==
Prior to this competition, the existing world, Asian and Games records were as follows.

World Record	Michael Johnson (USA)	19.32	Atlanta, United States	1 August 1996
Asian Record	Shingo Suetsugu (JPN)	20.03	Yokohama, Japan	7 June 2003
Games Record	Koji Ito (JPN)	20.25	Bangkok, Thailand	18 December 1998

== Results ==
Legend

- DNF — Did not finish
- DNS — Did not start

=== 1st round ===
- Qualification: First 2 in each heat (Q) and the next 2 fastest (q) advance to the final.

==== Heat 1 ====
- Wind: 0.0 m/s

Rank	Athlete	Time	Notes
1	Yang Yaozu (CHN)	20.88	Q
2	Hamed Al-Bishi (KSA)	21.25	Q
3	Yaser Omar El-Haj (QAT)	21.28	q
4	Lim Hee-nam (KOR)	21.57	
5	Yi Wei-chen (TPE)	21.71	
6	Aleksandr Zolotukhin (KGZ)	22.15	
7	Zahir Naseer (MDV)	23.80	
8	Sittichai Suwonprateep (THA)	23.87	

==== Heat 2 ====
- Wind: −0.2 m/s

Rank	Athlete	Time	Notes
1	Shingo Suetsugu (JPN)	21.04	Q
2	Adel Aseeri (KSA)	21.75	Q
3	Lim Jae-youl (KOR)	22.01	
4	Areef Ibrahim Badar (QAT)	22.25	
5	Taweesak Pooltong (THA)	22.29	
6	Taha Thabit (YEM)	23.09	
—	Mohamed Al-Rashedi (BRN)	DNS	

==== Heat 3 ====
- Wind: −1.3 m/s

Rank	Athlete	Time	Notes
1	Shinji Takahira (JPN)	21.19	Q
2	Khalil Al-Hanahneh (JOR)	21.49	Q
3	Fawzi Al-Shammari (KUW)	21.57	q
4	Tang Yik Chun (HKG)	21.68	
5	Masoud Azizi (AFG)	23.33	
—	Ali Shareef (MDV)	DNF	
—	Hareth Mohammed (IRQ)	DNS	

=== Final ===
- Wind: +0.7 m/s

Rank	Athlete	Time	Notes
1st place, gold medalist(s)	Shingo Suetsugu (JPN)	20.60	
2nd place, silver medalist(s)	Yang Yaozu (CHN)	20.71	
3rd place, bronze medalist(s)	Shinji Takahira (JPN)	20.81	
4	Hamed Al-Bishi (KSA)	20.83	
5	Khalil Al-Hanahneh (JOR)	21.32	
6	Fawzi Al-Shammari (KUW)	21.61	
7	Adel Aseeri (KSA)	21.61	
8	Yaser Omar El-Haj (QAT)	21.79	
