= 2007 Asian Athletics Championships – Men's 4 × 100 metres relay =

The men's 4 × 100 metres relay event at the 2007 Asian Athletics Championships was held in Amman, Jordan on July 28–29.

== Medalists ==
| Gold | Silver | Bronze |
|---|---|---|
| Thailand; Taweesak Pooltong; Wachara Sondee; Sompote Suwannarangsri; Sittichai Suwonprateep | Qatar; Saad Al-Shahwani; Samuel Francis; Areef Ibrahim Badar; Ibrahim Abdulla Al-Waleed | China; Wen Yongti; Cao Jian; Zhang Yuan; Liang Jiahong |

== Results ==
=== Heats ===
| Rank | Heat | Nation | Athletes | Time | Notes |
|---|---|---|---|---|---|
| 1 | 1 | Thailand | ?, ?, ?, ? | 39.53 | Q |
| 2 | 2 | China | ?, ?, ?, ? | 39.62 | Q |
| 3 | 1 | Qatar | ?, ?, ?, ? | 39.76 | Q |
| 4 | 2 | India | ?, ?, ?, ? | 40.18 | Q |
| 5 | 2 | Saudi Arabia | ?, ?, ?, ? | 40.51 | Q |
| 6 | 1 | Hong Kong | ?, ?, ?, ? | 40.64 | Q |
| 7 | 2 | Singapore | ?, ?, ?, ? | 40.95 | q |
| 8 | 2 | Kuwait | ?, ?, ?, ? | 41.31 | q |
| | 1 | Chinese Taipei | ?, ?, ?, ? | DNF | |
| | 2 | Jordan | ?, ?, ?, ? | DNF | |
| | 1 | Philippines | | DNS | |
| | 1 | Yemen | | DNS | |

=== Final ===
| Rank | Team | Name | Time | Notes |
|---|---|---|---|---|
| 1st place, gold medalist(s) | Thailand | Taweesak Pooltong, Wachara Sondee, Sompote Suwannarangsri, Sittichai Suwonprateep | 39.34 | |
| 2nd place, silver medalist(s) | Qatar | Saad Al-Shahwani, Samuel Francis, Areef Ibrahim Badar, Ibrahim Abdulla Al-Waleed | 39.64 | |
| 3rd place, bronze medalist(s) | China | Wen Yongti, Cao Jian, Zhang Yuan, Liang Jiahong | 39.71 | |
| 4 | India | Ritesh Anand, Shameer Mon, Vilas Neelagund, Nagaraj Gobbaragumpi | 39.84 | |
| 5 | Hong Kong | Tang Yik Chun, Lau Yu Leong, Wong Ka Chun, Chiang Wai Hung | 40.59 | |
| 6 | Saudi Arabia | Yasir Al-Nashri, Yahya Al-Gahes, Yahya Habeeb, Hamed Al-Bishi | 41.05 | |
| 7 | Singapore | Yeo Foo Ee Gary, Poh Seng Song, Mohammad Amirudin Bin Jamal, Calvin Kang Li Loon | 41.15 | |
| 8 | Kuwait | Saad Al-Yahya, Saleh Al-Hadad, Husein Al-Youha, Mohammad Al-Jawhar | 41.65 | |
