= 2005 Asian Athletics Championships – Men's 100 metres =

The men's 100 metres event at the 2005 Asian Athletics Championships was held in Incheon, South Korea on September 1–2.

== Medalists ==
Gold	Silver	Bronze
Yahya Al-Ghahes; Saudi Arabia	Shingo Suetsugu; Japan	Khaled Youssef Al-Obaidli; Qatar

== Results ==
=== Heats ===
Wind: Heat 1: +0.1 m/s, Heat 2: +0.3 m/s, Heat 3: 0.0 m/s, Heat 4: +0.3 m/s

Rank	Heat	Name	Nationality	Time	Notes
1	4	Khaled Youssef Al-Obaidli	Qatar	10.40	Q
2	2	Shingo Suetsugu	Japan	10.45	Q
3	3	Yahya Al-Ghahes	Saudi Arabia	10.47	Q
4	1	Nobuharu Asahara	Japan	10.51	Q
5	1	Anil Kumar Prakash	India	10.52	Q
6	3	Vitaly Medvedev	Kazakhstan	10.54	Q
7	1	Surendra Sanjeewa	Sri Lanka	10.55	Q
8	1	Saad Al-Shahwani	Qatar	10.59	q
9	2	Guo Fan	China	10.60	Q
10	3	John Muray	Indonesia	10.61	Q
11	2	Vyacheslav Muravyev	Kazakhstan	10.62	Q
12	2	Juma Al-Jabri	Oman	10.64	q
12	4	Wachara Sondee	Thailand	10.64	Q
14	4	Liu Dapeng	China	10.67	Q
15	3	Muhammad Imran	Pakistan	10.72	q, SB
16	4	Farag Al-Dosari	Saudi Arabia	10.73	q
17	1	Mohd Shameer Ayub	Singapore	10.80	
18	4	Choi Hyung-Rak	South Korea	10.81	
19	3	Lim Hee-Nam	South Korea	10.82	
20	1	Sompote Suwannarangsri	Thailand	10.86	
21	3	Fahad Al-Jabri	Oman	10.89	
22	2	Poh Seng Song	Singapore	10.90	
23	2	Wong Ka Chun	Hong Kong	10.97	
24	2	Mohamad Siraj Tamim	Lebanon	10.97	SB
25	4	Ali Shareef	Maldives	11.37	SB
26	1	Massoud Azizi	Afghanistan	11.38	

=== Semifinals ===
Wind: Heat 1: 0.0 m/s, Heat 2: -0.4 m/s

Rank	Heat	Name	Nationality	Time	Notes
1	2	Khaled Youssef Al-Obaidli	Qatar	10.36	Q
2	1	Yahya Al-Ghahes	Saudi Arabia	10.40	Q
3	2	Shingo Suetsugu	Japan	10.44	Q
4	1	Nobuharu Asahara	Japan	10.45	Q
5	1	Anil Kumar Prakash	India	10.46	Q
6	1	Vyacheslav Muravyev	Kazakhstan	10.55	Q
7	2	Wachara Sondee	Thailand	10.57	Q
8	1	Surendra Sanjeewa	Sri Lanka	10.58	
9	1	Saad Al-Shahwani	Qatar	10.60	
10	2	Vitaly Medvedev	Kazakhstan	10.61	Q
11	2	Juma Al-Jabri	Oman	10.66	
12	1	Guo Fan	China	10.67	
12	2	Liu Dapeng	China	10.67	
14	2	John Muray	Indonesia	10.73	
15	2	Farag Al-Dosari	Saudi Arabia	10.73	
16	1	Muhammad Imran	Pakistan	10.77	

=== Final ===
Wind: -0.3 m/s

Rank	Name	Nationality	Time	Notes
1st place, gold medalist(s)	Yahya Al-Ghahes	Saudi Arabia	10.39	
2nd place, silver medalist(s)	Shingo Suetsugu	Japan	10.42	
3rd place, bronze medalist(s)	Khaled Youssef Al-Obaidli	Qatar	10.45	
4	Nobuharu Asahara	Japan	10.57	
5	Wachara Sondee	Thailand	10.61	
6	Anil Kumar Prakash	India	10.61	
7	Vitaly Medvedev	Kazakhstan	10.67	
	Vyacheslav Muravyev	Kazakhstan	DNS	
