= Athletics at the 2003 Summer Universiade – Men's 4 × 100 metres relay =

The men's 4 × 100 metres relay event at the 2003 Summer Universiade was held in Daegu, South Korea on 29 and 30 August.

== Results ==
=== Heats ===
Rank	Heat	Nation	Athletes	Time	Notes
1	1	Russia	Yevgeniy Vorobyev, Aleksandr Ryabov, Roman Smirnov, Andrey Yepishin	39.63	Q
2	2	Japan	Kazuki Ishikura, Shinji Takahira, Tatsuro Yoshino, Tomoyuki Arai	39.77	Q
3	2	Estonia	Allar Aasma, Henri Sool, Martin Vihmann, Mikk Joorits	40.17	Q
4	1	Hungary	Imre Lőrincz, David Csesznegi, Gergely Németh, Tamás Margl	40.48	Q
5	1	South Korea	Im Ir-hoan, Kim Jae-geun, Park Tae-kyoung, Kang Tae-suk	40.56	Q
6	1	Senegal	Doudou Félou Sow, Djibril Diatta, Amadou Diouf, Malang Sané	40.56	q
7	2	Slovenia	Urban Matoh, Bostjan Fridrih, Matic Šušteršic, Jan Žumer	40.75	Q
8	2	Macau	Lei Ka In, Lam Cheng Fu, Wong Wai Ip, Leong Kin Kuan	42.97	q
9	2	Sri Lanka	Prabhashita Caldera, Ranjithkumar Silvapragasam, S. M. P. S. D. Pathirana, Thushanthan Ariyanayakam	43.94	
10	1	Oman	Nasser Amor Said Al-Naabi, Saif Al-Yarabi, Hilal Al-Rajhi, Alnobi Al-Kiyumi	44.24	

=== Final ===
Rank	Lane	Nation	Athletes	Time	Notes
1st place, gold medalist(s)	5	Japan	Kazuki Ishikura, Shinji Takahira, Tatsuro Yoshino, Tomoyuki Arai	39.45	
2nd place, silver medalist(s)	4	Russia	Yevgeniy Vorobyev, Aleksandr Ryabov, Roman Smirnov, Andrey Yepishin	39.67	
3rd place, bronze medalist(s)	3	Estonia	Allar Aasma, Henri Sool, Martin Vihmann, Mikk Joorits	39.99	
4	6	Hungary	Imre Lőrincz, David Csesznegi, Gergely Németh, Tamás Margl	40.61	
5	7	Slovenia	Ranko Leskovar, Bostjan Fridrih, Matic Šušteršic, Jan Žumer	40.63	
6	2	South Korea	Im Ir-hoan, Kim Jae-geun, Park Tae-kyoung, Kang Tae-suk	40.81	
7	1	Macau	Lei Ka In, Lam Cheng Fu, Wong Wai Ip, Leong Kin Kuan	43.05	
	8	Senegal		DNS	
