= 2005 Asian Athletics Championships – Men's 200 metres =

The men's 200 metres event at the 2005 Asian Athletics Championships was held in Incheon, South Korea on September 3–4.

== Medalists ==
Gold	Silver	Bronze
Hamed Al-Bishi; Saudi Arabia	Tatsuro Yoshino; Japan	Yang Yaozu; China

== Results ==
=== Heats ===
Wind: Heat 1: 0.0 m/s, Heat 2: +0.1 m/s, Heat 3: +0.3 m/s

Rank	Heat	Name	Nationality	Time	Notes
1	3	Hamed Al-Bishi	Saudi Arabia	21.23	Q
2	3	Tatsuro Yoshino	Japan	21.25	Q
3	2	Yang Yaozu	China	21.35	Q
4	2	Prasanna Amarasekara	Sri Lanka	21.41	Q
5	3	Hamood Al-Dalhami	Oman	21.46	q
6	2	Humoud Al-Saad	Kuwait	21.57	q
7	1	Tang Yik Chun	Hong Kong	21.69	Q
7	3	Suh Min-Suk	South Korea	21.69	
9	1	Wang Chengliang	China	21.72	Q
10	1	Yusuke Omae	Japan	21.74	
11	1	Mohamed Ali Al-Bishi	Saudi Arabia	21.76	
12	2	Hamed Kefah Al-Dosari	Qatar	21.77	
13	2	Mohamad Siraj Tamim	Lebanon	21.85	
14	1	Muhammad Imran	Pakistan	21.96	
15	1	Musabeh Al-Masoudi	Oman	22.13	
16	1	Chao Un Kei	Macau	22.31	
17	3	Shafiq Kashmiri	Singapore	22.40	SB
18	1	Ali Shareef	Maldives	22.58	SB
19	3	Massoud Azizi	Afghanistan	23.68	SB
20	2	Abdul Qadeer Ghani Zada	Afghanistan	24.07	PB

=== Final ===
Wind: +1.8 m/s

Rank	Name	Nationality	Time	Notes
1st place, gold medalist(s)	Hamed Al-Bishi	Saudi Arabia	20.66	SB
2nd place, silver medalist(s)	Tatsuro Yoshino	Japan	20.68	
3rd place, bronze medalist(s)	Yang Yaozu	China	20.85	
4	Tang Yik Chun	Hong Kong	21.01	
5	Prasanna Amarasekara	Sri Lanka	21.12	SB
6	Wang Chengliang	China	21.29	
7	Hamood Al-Dalhami	Oman	21.31	SB
8	Humoud Al-Saad	Kuwait	21.40	
