= Athletics at the 2010 Asian Games – Men's 4 × 100 metres relay =

Men's 4 × 100 metres relay at the 2010 Asian Games
- Venue: Aoti Main Stadium
- Dates: 23–26 November 2010
- Competitors: 55 from 13 nations

Medalists
gold medal	China; Lu Bin, Liang Jiahong, Su Bingtian, Lao Yi
silver medal	Chinese Taipei; Wang Wen-tang, Liu Yuan-kai, Tsai Meng-lin, Yi Wei-chen
bronze medal	Thailand; Poommanus Jankem, Wachara Sondee, Jirapong Meenapra, Sittichai Suwonprateep

The men's 4 × 100 metres relay event at the 2010 Asian Games was held at the Aoti Main Stadium, Guangzhou, China on 23–26 November.

== Schedule ==
All times are China Standard Time (UTC+08:00)

Date	Time	Event
Tuesday, 23 November 2010	18:10	Round 1
Friday, 26 November 2010	17:45	Final

== Records ==
Prior to this competition, the existing world, Asian and Games records were as follows.

World Record	Jamaica	37.10	Beijing, China	22 August 2008
Asian Record	Japan	38.03	Osaka, Japan	1 September 2007
Games Record	Thailand	38.82	Busan, South Korea	13 October 2002

== Results ==
Legend

- DNF — Did not finish
- DSQ — Disqualified

=== Round 1 ===
- Qualification: First 3 in each heat (Q) and the next 2 fastest (q) advance to the final.

==== Heat 1 ====
Rank	Team	Time	Notes
1	Chinese Taipei (TPE); Wang Wen-tang; Liu Yuan-kai; Tsai Meng-lin; Yi Wei-chen	39.34	Q
2	India (IND); B. G. Nagaraj; Ritesh Anand; Shameer Mon; Abdul Najeeb Qureshi	39.62	Q
3	Hong Kong (HKG); Tang Yik Chun; Lai Chun Ho; Yip Siu Keung; Tsui Chi Ho	39.87	Q
4	Oman (OMA); Fahad Al-Jabri; Barakat Al-Harthi; Abdullah Al-Sooli; Yahya Al-Noufali	40.00	q
5	United Arab Emirates (UAE); Khalifa Sarwashi; Ahmed Juma Al-Zaabi; Bilal Juma Al-Salfa; Omar Juma Al-Salfa	40.21	
—	South Korea (KOR); Yeo Ho-sua; Lim Hee-nam; Kim Kuk-young; Jeon Duk-hyung	DSQ	

==== Heat 2 ====
Rank	Team	Time	Notes
1	China (CHN); Lu Bin; Liang Jiahong; Su Bingtian; Lao Yi	39.03	Q
2	Thailand (THA); Poommanus Jankem; Wachara Sondee; Jirapong Meenapra; Sittichai Suwonprateep	39.57	Q
3	Indonesia (INA); Mohammad Fadlin; Suryo Agung Wibowo; Farrel Octaviandi; Franklin Ramses Burumi	39.78	Q
4	Saudi Arabia (KSA); Mussa Howsawi; Yasir Al-Nashiri; Yahya Habeeb; Faris Sharahili	39.90	q
5	Japan (JPN); Masashi Eriguchi; Shinji Takahira; Mitsuhiro Abiko; Kenji Fujimitsu	47.14	
—	Singapore (SIN); Gary Yeo; Elfi Mustapa; Amirudin Jamal; Calvin Kang	DNF	
—	Sri Lanka (SRI); Keith de Mel; Gihan Chamara; Ashan Hasaranga; Shiwantha Weerasuriya	DSQ	

=== Final ===
Rank	Team	Time	Notes
1st place, gold medalist(s)	China (CHN); Lu Bin; Liang Jiahong; Su Bingtian; Lao Yi	38.78	GR
2nd place, silver medalist(s)	Chinese Taipei (TPE); Wang Wen-tang; Liu Yuan-kai; Tsai Meng-lin; Yi Wei-chen	39.05	
3rd place, bronze medalist(s)	Thailand (THA); Poommanus Jankem; Wachara Sondee; Jirapong Meenapra; Sittichai Suwonprateep	39.09	
4	Hong Kong (HKG); Tang Yik Chun; Lai Chun Ho; Yip Siu Keung; Tsui Chi Ho	39.62	
5	Indonesia (INA); Mohammad Fadlin; Suryo Agung Wibowo; Farrel Octaviandi; Franklin Ramses Burumi	39.87	
6	Saudi Arabia (KSA); Mussa Howsawi; Yasir Al-Nashiri; Yahya Habeeb; Ahmed Al-Muwallad	40.01	
7	Oman (OMA); Fahad Al-Jabri; Yahya Al-Noufali; Abdullah Al-Sooli; Barakat Al-Harthi	40.02	
DQ	India (IND); Rahamatulla Molla; Suresh Sathya; Shameer Mon; Abdul Najeeb Qureshi	~~39.10~~	

- India originally finished 4th, but was later disqualified after IAAF announced that Suresh Sathya had tested positive for Nandrolone prior to the Asian Games.
