= 2005 Asian Athletics Championships – Men's 4 × 100 metres relay =

The men's 4 × 100 metres relay event at the 2005 Asian Athletics Championships was held in Incheon, South Korea on September 1–4.

== Medalists ==
Gold	Silver	Bronze
Japan; Kazuyoshi Hidaka; Tatsuro Yoshino; Yusuke Omae; Shingo Suetsugu	Thailand; Seksan Wongsala; Wachara Sondee; Ekkachai Janthana; Sittichai Suwonprateep	Saudi Arabia; Farag Al-Dosari; Mubarak Ata Mubarak; Yahya Al-Ghahes; Hamed Al-Bishi; Bader Al-Ainain*

== Results ==
=== Heats ===
Rank	Heat	Nation	Athletes	Time	Notes
1	1	Thailand	Seksan Wongsala, Wachara Sondee, Ekkachai Janthana, Sittichai Suwonprateep	39.39	Q
2	2	Japan	Kazuyoshi Hidaka, Tatsuro Yoshino, Yusuke Omae, Shingo Suetsugu	39.65	Q
3	1	India	Bharmappa Nagaraj, Sandeep Singh Sarkaria, Vilas Neelagund, Hariharan Jayachandran	39.83	Q
4	2	China	Guo Fan, Liu Dapeng, Yang Yaozu, Wang Chengliang	40.00	Q
5	2	Saudi Arabia	Yahya Al-Ghahes, Mubarak Ata Mubarak, Hamed Al-Bishi, Bader Al-Ainain	40.05	Q
6	2	Oman	Fahad Al-Jabri, Juma Al-Jabri, Hamood Al-Dalhami, Musabeh Al-Masoudi	40.09	q
7	1	Chinese Taipei	Wang Shih-Wen, Liu Yuan-Kai, Lin Yi-Wei, Cheng Ming-Sheng	40.37	Q
8	1	South Korea	Park Yeong-hwan, Lim Hee-nam, Suh Min-suk, Choi Hyung-rak	40.39	q
9	2	Kazakhstan	Grigoriy Volodin, Vyacheslav Muravyev, Rinat Galiyev, Vitaly Medvedev	40.48	
10	2	Sri Lanka	Prabashitha Caldera, Surendra Sanjeewa, Ravindra Kumara Sudath, Jon Dhanuska Perera	40.49	
11	1	Singapore	Poh Seng Song, Shafiq Kashmiri, Erzalm Fawzy Rawi, Mohd Shameer Ayub	41.03	
	1	Hong Kong	Leung Chun Wai, Lau Yu Leong, To Wai Lok, Chiang Wai Hung	DNF	

=== Final ===
Rank	Team	Name	Time	Notes
1st place, gold medalist(s)	Japan	Kazuyoshi Hidaka, Tatsuro Yoshino, Yusuke Omae, Shingo Suetsugu	39.10	
2nd place, silver medalist(s)	Thailand	Seksan Wongsala, Wachara Sondee, Ekkachai Janthana, Sittichai Suwonprateep	39.23	
3rd place, bronze medalist(s)	Saudi Arabia	Farag Al-Dosari, Mubarak Ata Mubarak, Yahya Al-Ghahes, Hamed Al-Bishi	39.25	
4	China	Guo Fan, Liu Dapeng, Yang Yaozu, Wang Chengliang	39.73	
5	India	Anil Kumar Prakash, Sandeep Singh Sarkaria, Vilas Neelagund, Hariharan Jayachandran	39.74	
6	Chinese Taipei	Wang Shih-Wen, Liu Yuan-Kai, Lin Yi-Wei, Chen Tien-Wen	40.25	
7	Oman	Fahad Al-Jabri, Juma Al-Jabri, Hamood Al-Dalhami, Musabeh Al-Masoudi	40.46	
8	South Korea	Park Yeong-hwan, Lim Hee-nam, Choi Hyung-rak, Suh Min-suk	40.57	
