= Athletics at the 2007 Summer Universiade – Men's 100 metres =

The men's 100 metres event at the 2007 Summer Universiade was held on 10–12 August. The final originally took place on 11 August but the results were cancelled due to a marginal false-start by Simeon Williamson, which was not at first noticed by the officials. A re-run was ordered a day later. The order of medalists, however, stayed the same after the second race.

== Medalists ==
Gold	Silver	Bronze
Simeon Williamson; Great Britain	Zhang Peimeng; China	Neville Wright; Canada

== Results ==
=== Heats ===
Qualification: First 3 of each heat (Q) and the next 8 fastest (q) qualified for the quarterfinals.

Wind:
Heat 1: -0.3 m/s, Heat 2: -0.6 m/s, Heat 3: -0.7 m/s, Heat 4: -0.6 m/s
Heat 5: -0.9 m/s, Heat 6: -0.6 m/s, Heat 7: -2.9 m/s, Heat 8: -3.0 m/s

Rank	Heat	Name	Nationality	Time	Notes
1	6	Neville Wright	Canada	10.50	Q
2	1	Adam Miller	Australia	10.52	Q
3	3	Adrian Durant	United States Virgin Islands	10.56	Q
3	4	Hannes Dreyer	South Africa	10.56	Q
5	7	Amr Ibrahim Mostafa Seoud	Egypt	10.58	Q
6	3	Ryan Scott	Great Britain	10.59	Q
7	6	Kael Becerra	Chile	10.60	Q
8	4	Zhang Peimeng	China	10.66	Q
9	1	Yin Hualong	China	10.67	Q
9	7	Wachara Sondee	Thailand	10.67	Q
11	6	Geronimo Goeloe	Netherlands Antilles	10.69	Q
12	7	Arnaldo Abrantes	Portugal	10.71	Q
13	5	Dmytro Hlushchenko	Ukraine	10.72	Q
13	6	Žilvinas Adomavičius	Lithuania	10.72	q
15	5	Mohd Latif Nyat	Malaysia	10.73	Q
16	4	Shafiq Kashmiri	Singapore	10.77	Q
17	8	Simeon Williamson	Great Britain	10.79	Q
18	1	Yi Wei-chen	Chinese Taipei	10.84	Q, SB
19	3	Christopher Kofi Gyapong	Ghana	10.84	Q
20	2	Chriswill De Wee	Namibia	10.86	Q
21	5	Pirom Autas	Thailand	10.87	Q
22	4	Lau Yu Leong	Hong Kong	10.88	q
22	5	Thierry Adanabou	Burkina Faso	10.88	q
24	8	Shinichiro Iwamoto	Japan	10.90	Q
25	5	Prince Kwidama	Netherlands Antilles	10.96	q
25	7	Lee Jun-woo	South Korea	10.96	q
25	7	Liu Yuan-kai	Chinese Taipei	10.96	q
28	1	Tshepang Tshube	Botswana	11.04	q, FS1
29	2	Franklin Nazareno	Ecuador	11.05	Q
30	5	Jacob Wolfgang	Denmark	11.07	q
31	1	Malamine Diame	Senegal	11.10	
31	8	Poh Seng Song	Singapore	11.10	Q
33	6	Mohammad Talha Iftikhar	Pakistan	11.13	
34	3	Wong Ka Chun	Hong Kong	11.14	
35	5	Chao Un Kei	Macau	11.15	
36	7	Mohd Syarafie Bin Sauli	Malaysia	11.16	
37	4	Mounir Mahadi	Chad	11.19	
38	4	Haykal Moussallem	Lebanon	11.21	FS1
39	2	Ernest Ofei-Brako	Ghana	11.23	Q
40	7	Ali Al-Rashdi	Oman	11.34	
41	8	Hithanadura Lasitha Silva	Sri Lanka	11.39	
42	6	John Kennedy Okewling	Uganda	11.40	
43	3	Julius Kasule	Uganda	11.42	
44	6	Hilary Wesonga Weguld	Kenya	11.44	
45	4	Sou Chon Kin	Macau	11.60	
45	8	Jacob Bolo	Kenya	11.60	
47	1	Jalal Kazi Shah	Bangladesh	11.62	
47	2	Joseph El-Kharrat	Lebanon	11.62	
49	7	Sergio Mba Nso	Equatorial Guinea	11.67	
50	8	Rogers Aheebwa	Uganda	11.77	
51	8	Mubarak Al-Malik	Qatar	11.81	
52	2	Leon Choongwe	Zambia	11.88	
53	6	Mohamed Al-Simat	Bahrain	12.42	
54	3	Ahmad Baniabbas	Qatar	13.02	
55	2	Kouame Florentin Dossou Ayedjo	Benin	14.73	
	2	Mmoloki Seele	Botswana	DQ	FS1
	1	Raymond Diogo	Uganda	DNS	
	3	Masashi Eriguchi	Japan	DNS	
	3	Henri Sool	Estonia	DNS	

=== Quarterfinals ===
Qualification: First 4 of each heat qualified directly (Q) for the semifinals.

Wind:
Heat 1: -0.8 m/s, Heat 2: -0.6 m/s, Heat 3: -0.9 m/s, Heat 4: -0.6 m/s

Rank	Heat	Name	Nationality	Time	Notes
1	1	Adam Miller	Australia	10.40	Q
2	4	Neville Wright	Canada	10.42	Q
3	3	Amr Ibrahim Mostafa Seoud	Egypt	10.48	Q
4	1	Arnaldo Abrantes	Portugal	10.53	Q
5	2	Dmytro Hlushchenko	Ukraine	10.54	Q
6	2	Hannes Dreyer	South Africa	10.55	Q
7	1	Simeon Williamson	Great Britain	10.56	Q
7	4	Franklin Nazareno	Ecuador	10.56	Q
7	4	Ryan Scott	Great Britain	10.56	Q
10	2	Zhang Peimeng	China	10.57	Q
11	3	Adrian Durant	United States Virgin Islands	10.58	Q
12	1	Kael Becerra	Chile	10.59	Q
12	3	Yin Hualong	China	10.59	Q
14	3	Wachara Sondee	Thailand	10.68	Q
14	4	Chriswill De Wee	Namibia	10.68	Q
16	1	Shinichiro Iwamoto	Japan	10.71	
17	4	Žilvinas Adomavičius	Lithuania	10.74	
18	2	Mohd Latif Nyat	Malaysia	10.75	Q
19	2	Liu Yuan-kai	Chinese Taipei	10.79	
19	4	Geronimo Goeloe	Netherlands Antilles	10.79	
21	3	Christopher Kofi Gyapong	Ghana	10.80	
22	2	Pirom Autas	Thailand	10.81	
23	2	Shafiq Kashmiri	Singapore	10.85	
24	2	Lau Yu Leong	Hong Kong	10.88	
25	1	Poh Seng Song	Singapore	10.93	
26	3	Yi Wei-chen	Chinese Taipei	10.94	
27	1	Thierry Adanabou	Burkina Faso	10.95	F1
28	3	Lee Jun-woo	South Korea	10.97	
29	4	Jacob Wolfgang	Denmark	11.08	
30	1	Tshepang Tshube	Botswana	11.12	
31	4	Ernest Ofei-Brako	Ghana	11.32	
	3	Prince Kwidama	Netherlands Antilles	DNS	

=== Semifinals ===
Wind:
Heat 1: -2.0 m/s, Heat 2: -3.8 m/s Qualification: First 4 of each semifinal qualified directly (Q) for the final.

Rank	Heat	Name	Nationality	Time	Notes
1	1	Neville Wright	Canada	10.42	Q
2	1	Amr Ibrahim Mostafa Seoud	Egypt	10.45	Q
3	1	Zhang Peimeng	China	10.47	Q
4	1	Simeon Williamson	Great Britain	10.49	Q
5	2	Adam Miller	Australia	10.62	Q
6	1	Wachara Sondee	Thailand	10.63	
7	1	Hannes Dreyer	South Africa	10.63	
8	2	Dmytro Hlushchenko	Ukraine	10.64	Q
9	2	Arnaldo Abrantes	Portugal	10.66	Q
10	1	Franklin Nazareno	Ecuador	10.67	
11	2	Yin Hualong	China	10.70	Q
12	2	Ryan Scott	Great Britain	10.76	
13	2	Kael Becerra	Chile	10.81	
14	1	Chriswill De Wee	Namibia	10.88	
15	2	Mohd Latif Nyat	Malaysia	10.98	
16	2	Adrian Durant	United States Virgin Islands	16.14	

=== Final ===
Wind: -0.9 m/s

Rank	Lane	Name	Nationality	Time	Notes
1st place, gold medalist(s)	8	Simeon Williamson	Great Britain	10.22	
2nd place, silver medalist(s)	7	Zhang Peimeng	China	10.30	
3rd place, bronze medalist(s)	5	Neville Wright	Canada	10.37	
4	3	Adam Miller	Australia	10.39	
5	4	Dmytro Hlushchenko	Ukraine	10.39	
6	1	Arnaldo Abrantes	Portugal	10.53	
7	6	Amr Ibrahim Mostafa Seoud	Egypt	10.53	
8	2	Yin Hualong	China	10.66	
