= Athletics at the 2003 Summer Universiade – Men's 200 metres =

The men's 200 metres event at the 2003 Summer Universiade was held in Daegu, South Korea on 27–28 August.

== Medalists ==
Gold	Silver	Bronze
Leigh Julius; South Africa	Paul Hession; Ireland	Jiří Vojtík; Czech Republic

== Results ==
=== Heats ===
Wind:
Heat 1: -0.5 m/s, Heat 2: -0.3 m/s, Heat 3: -1.3 m/s, Heat 4: +1.9 m/s, Heat 5: +0.9 m/s, Heat 6: -0.6 m/s

Rank	Heat	Athlete	Nationality	Time	Notes
1	5	Juan Pedro Toledo	Mexico	21.03	Q
2	4	Paul Hession	Ireland	21.11	Q
3	5	Leigh Julius	South Africa	21.19	Q
4	1	Tatsuro Yoshino	Japan	21.42	Q
5	3	Jiří Vojtík	Czech Republic	21.52	Q
6	6	Ray Ardill	Canada	21.56	Q
7	6	Marc Schneeberger	Switzerland	21.61	Q
8	4	Xavier James	Bermuda	21.63	Q
9	5	Adam Miller	Australia	21.71	Q
10	1	Henri Sool	Estonia	21.75	Q
11	2	Liu Yuan-Kai	Chinese Taipei	21.78	Q
12	6	Martin Vihmann	Estonia	21.78	Q
13	1	Thobias Akwenye	Namibia	21.81	Q
14	2	Tomoyuki Arai	Japan	21.90	Q
15	4	Valentin Bulichev	Azerbaijan	22.04	Q
16	1	Gaberieli Waqavanua	Fiji	22.06	Q
17	2	Craig Bearda	New Zealand	22.08	Q
18	3	Malang Sané	Senegal	22.08	Q
19	3	Diego Ferreira	Paraguay	22.28	Q
20	4	Lai Ka Pun	Hong Kong	22.30	Q
21	4	Alain Olivier Nyoumai	Cameroon	22.32	q
22	3	Raymond Diogo	Uganda	22.33	Q
23	5	Koffi Kouadio	Ivory Coast	22.43	Q
24	4	Kenneth Khoo Kian Seong	Singapore	22.45	q
25	6	Kim Jae-da	South Korea	22.58	Q
26	3	Karl Farrugia	Malta	22.72	q
27	1	Wilfried Bingangoye	Gabon	22.79	q
28	2	Boikaego Ennetse	Botswana	22.85	Q
29	5	Prabashitha Caldera	Sri Lanka	22.89	q
30	6	Eric Chan Chi Hong	Hong Kong	22.89	q
31	2	Teu Koon Kiat	Singapore	22.90	q
32	5	Wang Peng	China	23.24	q
33	4	Giancarlo Castro	Peru	23.25	
34	4	Lei Pak Lim	Macau	23.31	
35	5	Saif Al-Yarabi	Oman	23.34	
36	1	Nasser Amor Said Al-Naabi	Oman	23.62	
37	3	Sergio Mba Nsono	Equatorial Guinea	24.06	
38	2	Chadana Wickramarachchi	Sri Lanka	24.22	
39	6	Rory Forde	Guyana	24.44	

=== Quarterfinals ===
Wind:
Heat 1: -0.1 m/s, Heat 2: +0.1 m/s, Heat 3: +0.6 m/s, Heat 4: -0.8 m/s

Rank	Heat	Athlete	Nationality	Time	Notes
1	3	Jiří Vojtík	Czech Republic	20.99	Q
2	3	Leigh Julius	South Africa	21.20	Q
3	1	Tatsuro Yoshino	Japan	21.26	Q
4	4	Juan Pedro Toledo	Mexico	21.36	Q
5	2	Tomoyuki Arai	Japan	21.38	Q
6	2	Martin Vihmann	Estonia	21.45	Q
7	4	Paul Hession	Ireland	21.47	Q
8	1	Adam Miller	Australia	21.49	Q
9	1	Henri Sool	Estonia	21.54	Q
10	2	Liu Yuan-Kai	Chinese Taipei	21.57	Q
11	3	Ray Ardill	Canada	21.58	Q
12	1	Malang Sané	Senegal	21.62	Q
13	2	Xavier James	Bermuda	21.63	Q
14	1	Craig Bearda	New Zealand	21.71	
15	4	Marc Schneeberger	Switzerland	21.77	Q
16	4	Thobias Akwenye	Namibia	21.85	Q
17	3	Gaberieli Waqavanua	Fiji	22.01	Q
18	2	Koffi Kouadio	Ivory Coast	22.19	
19	2	Diego Ferreira	Paraguay	22.19	
20	3	Valentin Bulichev	Azerbaijan	22.29	
21	3	Karl Farrugia	Malta	22.44	
22	3	Lai Ka Pun	Hong Kong	22.45	
23	2	Teu Koon Kiat	Singapore	22.57	
24	4	Alain Olivier Nyoumai	Cameroon	22.64	
25	1	Kim Jae-da	South Korea	22.66	
26	2	Eric Chan Chi Hong	Hong Kong	22.75	
27	1	Kenneth Khoo Kian Seong	Singapore	22.86	
28	4	Boikaego Ennetse	Botswana	22.93	
29	1	Wilfried Bingangoye	Gabon	22.96	
30	4	Prabashitha Caldera	Sri Lanka	23.18	
	?	Wang Peng	China	?	
	?	Raymond Diogo	Uganda	?	

=== Semifinals ===
Wind:
Heat 1: +0.9 m/s, Heat 2: +0.2 m/s

Rank	Heat	Athlete	Nationality	Time	Notes
1	2	Leigh Julius	South Africa	20.77	Q
2	2	Paul Hession	Ireland	20.80	Q
3	1	Jiří Vojtík	Czech Republic	20.91	Q
4	1	Tomoyuki Arai	Japan	21.02	Q
5	1	Juan Pedro Toledo	Mexico	21.16	Q
6	2	Martin Vihmann	Estonia	21.18	Q
7	1	Henri Sool	Estonia	21.19	Q
7	2	Tatsuro Yoshino	Japan	21.19	Q
9	1	Adam Miller	Australia	21.30	
10	2	Ray Ardill	Canada	21.46	Q
11	1	Malang Sané	Senegal	21.47	
12	2	Marc Schneeberger	Switzerland	21.48	
13	2	Liu Yuan-Kai	Chinese Taipei	21.75	
14	1	Xavier James	Bermuda	21.79	
15	1	Gaberieli Waqavanua	Fiji	21.80	
	2	Thobias Akwenye	Namibia	DNS	

=== Final ===
Wind: -0.7 m/s

Rank	Lane	Athlete	Nationality	Time	Notes
1st place, gold medalist(s)	4	Leigh Julius	South Africa	20.49	
2nd place, silver medalist(s)	3	Paul Hession	Ireland	20.89	
3rd place, bronze medalist(s)	5	Jiří Vojtík	Czech Republic	21.03	
4	6	Tomoyuki Arai	Japan	21.07	
5	7	Martin Vihmann	Estonia	21.15	
6	8	Tatsuro Yoshino	Japan	21.18	
7	2	Juan Pedro Toledo	Mexico	21.94	
	1	Henri Sool	Estonia	DNS	
