= Athletics at the 2005 Summer Universiade – Men's 200 metres =

Sporting event

The men's 200 metres event at the 2005 Summer Universiade was held on 17–18 August in İzmir, Turkey.

== Medalists ==
Gold	Silver	Bronze
Leigh Julius; South Africa	Shinji Takahira; Japan	Paul Hession; Ireland

== Results ==
=== Heats ===
Wind:
Heat 1: -0.1 m/s, Heat 2: +0.1 m/s, Heat 3: +1.9 m/s, Heat 4: 0.0 m/s, Heat 5: +1.2 m/s
Heat 6: +1.4 m/s, Heat 7: +0.4 m/s, Heat 8: -0.4 m/s, Heat 9: +1.8 m/s

Rank	Heat	Athlete	Nationality	Time	Notes
1	4	Paul Hession	Ireland	21.12	Q
1	7	Sandro Viana	Brazil	21.12	Q
3	4	Tim Abeyie	Great Britain	21.14	Q
4	8	Till Helmke	Germany	21.15	Q
5	6	Shinji Takahira	Japan	21.21	Q
6	1	Leigh Julius	South Africa	21.26	Q
6	7	Henri Sool	Estonia	21.26	Q, SB
8	4	Martin Vihmann	Estonia	21.27	Q
8	7	Andrew Moore	New Zealand	21.27	Q, PB
10	6	Christie van Wyk	Namibia	21.35	Q
11	9	Jiří Vojtík	Czech Republic	21.40	Q
12	3	Jin Ke	China	21.41	Q
12	6	Sittichai Suwonprateep	Thailand	21.41	Q
12	8	Masaya Minami	Japan	21.41	Q
12	8	Tal Mor	Israel	21.41	Q
16	7	Darren Chin	Great Britain	21.42	q
17	3	Marc Schneeberger	Switzerland	21.43	Q
18	1	Orion Nicely	Jamaica	21.44	Q
18	8	Maksim Mokrousov	Russia	21.44	q
20	1	Josip Šoprek	Croatia	21.46	Q
20	2	Dewayne Barrett	Jamaica	21.46	Q
22	9	Ahmed Ajiboye	Nigeria	21.50	Q
23	3	Rudolf Götz	Czech Republic	21.52	Q
24	6	Attila Farkas	Hungary	21.56	q
25	6	Liu Yuan-Kai	Chinese Taipei	21.57	q
26	2	Ivan Teplykh	Russia	21.59	Q
26	8	Luca Verdecchia	Italy	21.59	q, SB
28	8	Elton Garus-Oab	Namibia	21.60	
29	1	Mario Trillo	Mexico	21.61	
30	5	İsmail Aslan	Turkey	21.62	Q
31	4	Du Bing	China	21.64	
32	5	Lin Yi-Wei	Chinese Taipei	21.73	Q
33	5	Massimiliano Donati	Italy	21.74	Q, SB
34	7	Ron Richards	Liberia	21.77	
35	7	Snyman Prinsloo	South Africa	21.82	
36	2	Sompote Suwannarangsri	Thailand	21.87	Q
36	9	Nathan Vadeboncoeur	Canada	21.87	Q
38	3	Félix Martínez	Puerto Rico	21.88	
39	3	Mads Bangsø	Denmark	21.90	
40	6	Raymond Diogo	Uganda	21.96	SB
41	9	Craig Bearda	New Zealand	21.98	
42	3	Svetoslav Stanev	Bulgaria	22.00	
42	9	Behrooz Mahdavi	Iran	22.00	
44	1	Tshepang Tshube	Botswana	22.08	
45	1	Chao Un Kei	Macau	22.18	
45	2	Lui Ka Ho	Hong Kong	22.18	
47	5	Mohamad Tamim	Lebanon	22.21	
48	2	Hakan Karacaoğlu	Turkey	22.27	
49	8	Mohammad Talha Iftikhar	Pakistan	22.30	
50	5	Stanislav Knezhanski	Bulgaria	22.59	
51	2	Alassane Diallo	Senegal	22.69	
52	2	Kayode Isijola	Nigeria	22.80	
53	4	Boikaego Ennetse	Botswana	22.91	
53	6	Eric Marende	Kenya	22.91	
55	2	Joseph Kharrat	Lebanon	23.11	
56	4	Timothy Szeto Man Ho	Hong Kong	22.24	
57	4	Andrew Opata	Uganda	23.20	
58	7	Neal Borg	Malta	23.24	
59	9	Lam Chang Fu	Macau	23.27	
60	8	Edward Mkandawire	Malawi	23.93	
	7	Emanuel Parris	Canada	DQ	
	9	Ivan Borg	Malta	DNF	

=== Quarterfinals ===
Wind:
Heat 1: -0.1 m/s, Heat 2: +0.3 m/s, Heat 3: +0.3 m/s, Heat 4: -0.4 m/s

Rank	Heat	Athlete	Nationality	Time	Notes
1	2	Leigh Julius	South Africa	20.84	Q
2	2	Shinji Takahira	Japan	20.86	Q
3	3	Paul Hession	Ireland	20.94	Q
4	3	Dewayne Barrett	Jamaica	21.00	Q
5	2	Marc Schneeberger	Switzerland	21.03	Q
6	2	Martin Vihmann	Estonia	21.05	Q, PB
7	4	Sandro Viana	Brazil	21.09	Q
8	1	Till Helmke	Germany	21.10	Q
9	4	Josip Šoprek	Croatia	21.18	Q
10	2	Darren Chin	Great Britain	21.22	SB
11	1	Jiří Vojtík	Czech Republic	21.25	Q
11	3	Ahmed Ajiboye	Nigeria	21.25	Q
13	2	Christie van Wyk	Namibia	21.26	SB
14	4	Jin Ke	China	21.27	Q
15	1	Henri Sool	Estonia	21.28	Q
16	1	Masaya Minami	Japan	21.33	Q
16	3	Ivan Teplykh	Russia	21.33	Q
18	2	Sittichai Suwonprateep	Thailand	21.34	
18	4	Tim Abeyie	Great Britain	21.34	Q
20	2	Maksim Mokrousov	Russia	21.45	
21	4	Orion Nicely	Jamaica	21.47	
22	1	Tal Mor	Israel	21.49	
23	1	Andrew Moore	New Zealand	21.53	
24	3	Rudolf Götz	Czech Republic	21.56	
25	3	Liu Yuan-Kai	Chinese Taipei	21.56	
26	1	Nathan Vadeboncoeur	Canada	21.64	
26	3	İsmail Aslan	Turkey	21.64	
28	1	Attila Farkas	Hungary	21.73	
29	4	Lin Yi-Wei	Chinese Taipei	21.74	
30	3	Massimiliano Donati	Italy	21.84	
31	4	Sompote Suwannarangsri	Thailand	22.12	
	4	Luca Verdecchia	Italy	DNS	

=== Semifinals ===
Wind:
Heat 1: -0.7 m/s, Heat 2: +0.2 m/s

Rank	Heat	Athlete	Nationality	Time	Notes
1	1	Leigh Julius	South Africa	20.75	Q
2	1	Shinji Takahira	Japan	20.77	Q
3	1	Till Helmke	Germany	20.84	Q
4	2	Paul Hession	Ireland	20.95	Q
5	1	Tim Abeyie	Great Britain	21.03	Q
6	2	Martin Vihmann	Estonia	21.14	Q
7	2	Josip Šoprek	Croatia	21.16	Q
8	2	Sandro Viana	Brazil	21.17	Q
9	2	Dewayne Barrett	Jamaica	21.20	
10	2	Jin Ke	China	21.23	
11	2	Ahmed Ajiboye	Nigeria	21.29	
12	1	Jiří Vojtík	Czech Republic	21.33	
13	2	Masaya Minami	Japan	21.42	
14	1	Henri Sool	Estonia	21.52	
15	1	Ivan Teplykh	Russia	21.54	
	1	Marc Schneeberger	Switzerland	DNF	

=== Final ===
Wind: +1.1 m/s

Rank	Athlete	Nationality	Time	Notes
1st place, gold medalist(s)	Leigh Julius	South Africa	20.56	
2nd place, silver medalist(s)	Shinji Takahira	Japan	20.93	
3rd place, bronze medalist(s)	Paul Hession	Ireland	21.02	
4	Till Helmke	Germany	21.03	
5	Martin Vihmann	Estonia	21.21	
6	Josip Šoprek	Croatia	21.31	
7	Tim Abeyie	Great Britain	21.35	
8	Sandro Viana	Brazil	21.43	
