= Liu Yuan-kai =

Taiwanese sprinter

Medal record

Men's athletics

Representing Chinese Taipei

Asian Championships
Bronze medal – third place	2009 Guangzhou	4×100 m

Liu Yuan-kai (born 2 December 1981) is a Taiwanese athlete who specialises in the sprinting events. He represented his country at the 2011 and 2013 World Championships as well as four consecutive Asian Games.

== Competition record ==
Year	Competition	Venue	Position	Event	Notes
Representing Chinese Taipei
1998	World Youth Games	Moscow, Russia	10th (sf)	400 m	50.23
1998	World Youth Games	Moscow, Russia	3rd	4 × 400 m relay	3:20.83
1999	Asian Junior Championships	Singapore	8th	200 m	22.10
1999	Asian Junior Championships	Singapore	5th	400 m	47.73
2000	World Junior Championships	Santiago, Chile	36th (h)	200 m	22.15
2000	World Junior Championships	Santiago, Chile	31st (h)	400 m	49.06
2002	Asian Games	Busan, South Korea	6th (h)	4 × 100 m relay	40.15
2003	Universiade	Daegu, South Korea	3rd (h)	100 m	10.69
2003	Universiade	Daegu, South Korea	1st (h)	200 m	21.78
2003	Asian Championships	Manila, Philippines	13th (sf)	100 m	10.73
2003	Asian Championships	Manila, Philippines	14th (sf)	200 m	21.75
2004	Asian Indoor Championships	Tehran, Iran	7th	100 m	6.92
2005	Universiade	İzmir, Turkey	27th (qf)	100 m	10.73
2005	Universiade	İzmir, Turkey	25th (qf)	200 m	21.56
2005	Universiade	İzmir, Turkey	10th (h)	4 × 100 m relay	40.83
2005	Asian Championships	Incheon, South Korea	6th	4 × 100 m relay	40.25
2006	Asian Games	Doha, Qatar	10th (sf)	100 m	10.57
2006	Asian Games	Doha, Qatar	4th	4 × 100 m relay	39.99
2007	Universiade	Bangkok, Thailand	19th (qf)	100 m	10.79
2009	Asian Championships	Guangzhou, China	3rd	4 × 100 m relay	39.57
2009	East Asian Games	Hong Kong, China	1st	4 × 100 m relay	39.31
2009	East Asian Games	Hong Kong, China	3rd	4 × 400 m relay	3:10.47
2010	Asian Games	Guangzhou, China	2nd	4 × 100 m relay	39.05
2011	Asian Championships	Kobe, Japan	15th (h)	100 m	10.72
2011	Asian Championships	Kobe, Japan	3rd	4 × 100 m relay	39.30
2011	World Championships	Daegu, South Korea	16th (h)	4 × 100 m relay	39.30
2013	Asian Championships	Pune, India	5th	4 × 100 m relay	39.52
2013	World Championships	Moscow, Russia	22nd (h)	4 × 100 m relay	39.72
2014	Asian Games	Incheon, South Korea	5th	4 × 100 m relay	39.20

== Personal bests ==
Outdoor

- 100 metres – 10.29 (+0.9 m/s, Yunlin 2006)
- 200 metres – 20.84 (+0.5 m/s, Tainan 2007)
- 400 metres – 47.31 (Kaohsiung 1999)

Indoor

- 60 metres – 6.90 (Tehran 2004)
