= Vihmann =

Vihmann is a surname. Notable people with the surname include:

- Madis Vihmann (born 1995), Estonian footballer
- Martin Vihmann (born 1981), Estonian athletics competitor
