= Yusuke Omae =

Japanese sprinter

Personal information
- Nationality: Japanese
- Born: 6 April 1982 (age 44) Tokyo, Japan
- Education: Waseda University
- Height: 1.76 m (5 ft 9 in)
- Weight: 68 kg (150 lb)

Sport
- Country: Japan
- Sport: Track and field
- Events: 200 metres 4×100 metres relay

Achievements and titles
- Personal bests: 100 m: 10.33 s (2001, 2004); 200 m: 20.29 s (2001) AU20R
Medal record
Men's athletics
Representing Japan
Asian Games
Silver medal – second place	2006 Doha	4×100 m relay
Asian Championships
Gold medal – first place	2005 Incheon	4×100 m relay
Bronze medal – third place	2003 Manila	4×100 m relay
East Asian Games
Gold medal – first place	2005 Macau	4×100 m relay
Universiade
Gold medal – first place	2001 Beijing	4×100 m relay
World Junior Championships
Bronze medal – third place	2000 Santiago	4×100 m relay
Asian Junior Championships
Gold medal – first place	1999 Singapore	4×100 m relay
Bronze medal – third place	1999 Singapore	200 m
Bronze medal – third place	2001 Bandar Seri Begawan	200 m
World Youth Championships
Silver medal – second place	1999 Bydgoszcz	4×100 m relay

Yusuke Omae (大前 祐介, Ōmae Yūsuke; born 6 April 1982 in Tokyo) is a Japanese retired track and field sprinter who specialized in the 200 metres. His personal best in the event is 20.29 seconds set in Matsumoto in 2001. This is the current Asian U20 record. He won multiple medals with the Japanese 4 × 100 metres relay team.

He is married to former gymnast Nina Saeed Yokota, with whom he has a child.

== Personal bests ==
Event	Time	Wind	Competition	Venue	Date	Notes
100 m	10.33 s	+1.6 m/s	Japanese Junior Championships	Matsumoto, Japan	1 July 2001	
100 m	10.33 s	+1.2 m/s	Mikio Oda Memorial	Hiroshima, Japan	29 April 2004	
200 m	20.29 s	+0.6 m/s	Japanese Junior Championships	Matsumoto, Japan	30 June 2001	Current AU20R

== International competition ==
Year	Competition	Venue	Position	Event	Time
Representing Japan
1999	World Youth Championships	Bydgoszcz, Poland	9th (sf)	200 m	21.73 (wind: +0.7 m/s)
1999	World Youth Championships	Bydgoszcz, Poland	2nd	4×100 m relay	40.14 (relay leg: 4th)
1999	Asian Junior Championships	Singapore	3rd	200 m	21.17 (wind: -0.3 m/s)
1999	Asian Junior Championships	Singapore	1st	4×100 m relay	39.86 (relay leg: 4th)
2000	World Junior Championships	Santiago, Chile	5th	200 m	21.05 (wind: +1.3 m/s)
2000	World Junior Championships	Santiago, Chile	3rd	4×100 m relay	39.47 (relay leg: 3rd) NJR
2001	Asian Junior Championships	Bandar Seri Begawan, Brunei	3rd	200 m	21.22 (wind: +2.9 m/s)
2001	Universiade	Beijing, China	11th (sf)	200 m	21.05 (wind: +2.7 m/s)
2001	Universiade	Beijing, China	1st	4×100 m relay	38.77 (relay leg: 3rd)
2002	Asian Championships	Colombo, Sri Lanka	13th (h)	200 m	21.75
2002	Asian Championships	Colombo, Sri Lanka	4th	4×100 m relay	39.41 (relay leg: 4th)
2003	Asian Championships	Manila, Philippines	6th	200 m	21.26 (wind: +0.4 m/s)
2003	Asian Championships	Manila, Philippines	3rd	4×100 m relay	39.59 (relay leg: 3rd)
2005	Asian Championships	Incheon, South Korea	10th (h)	200 m	21.74 (wind: 0.0 m/s)
2005	Asian Championships	Incheon, South Korea	1st	4×100 m relay	39.10 (relay leg: 3rd)
2005	East Asian Games	Macau, China	5th	200 m	21.62 (wind: -0.5 m/s)
2005	East Asian Games	Macau, China	1st	4×100 m relay	39.61 (relay leg: 3rd)
2006	Asian Games	Doha, Qatar	2nd	4×100 m relay	39.21 (relay leg: 3rd)
