= Tatsuro Yoshino =

Japanese sprinter

Personal information
- Nationality: Japanese
- Born: 11 September 1982 (age 43) Chiba Prefecture, Japan
- Education: Tokai University
- Height: 1.70 m (5 ft 7 in)
- Weight: 67 kg (148 lb)

Sport
- Country: Japan
- Sport: Track and field
- Event(s): 100 metres 200 metres
- Personal best(s): 100 m: 10.27 (Sapporo 2005); 200 m: 20.67 (Yokohama 2003)
Medal record
Men's athletics
Representing Japan
Asian Championships
Gold medal – first place	2005 Incheon	4×100 m relay
Silver medal – second place	2005 Incheon	200 m
Universiade
Gold medal – first place	2003 Daegu	4×100 m relay
Asian Junior Championships
Silver medal – second place	2001 Bandar Seri Begawan	4×100 m relay

Tatsuro Yoshino (吉野 達郎, Yoshino Tatsurō; born 11 September 1982) is a retired Japanese sprinter. He competed in the 4 × 100 metres relay at the 2005 World Championships finishing eighth.

== Competition record ==
Year	Competition	Venue	Position	Event	Notes
Representing Japan
2001	Asian Junior Championships	Bandar Seri Begawan, Brunei	2nd	200 m	21.11 (w)
2001	Asian Junior Championships	Bandar Seri Begawan, Brunei	2nd	4 × 100 m relay	40.35
2003	Universiade	Daegu, South Korea	6th	200 m	21.18
2003	Universiade	Daegu, South Korea	1st	4 × 100 m relay	39.45
2003	Asian Championships	Manila, Philippines	5th	200 m	21.14
2005	World Championships	Helsinki, Finland	8th	4 × 100 m relay	38.77
2005	Asian Championships	Incheon, South Korea	2nd	200 m	20.68
2005	Asian Championships	Incheon, South Korea	1st	4 × 100 m relay	39.10

== Personal bests ==
Event	Time (s)	Competition	Venue	Date	Notes
100 m	10.27 (+2.0 m/s)	Nanbu Chuhei Memorial	Sapporo, Japan	10 July 2005	
100 m	10.25 (+3.4 m/s)	Nanbu Chuhei Memorial	Sapporo, Japan	18 July 2015	Wind-assisted
200 m	20.67 (+0.2 m/s)	Japanese Championships	Yokohama, Japan	6 June 2003	
200 m	20.51 (+3.6 m/s)	Shizuoka International Meet	Shizuoka, Japan	3 May 2003	Wind-assisted
