= Yuta Kanno =

Japanese sprinter (born 1980)

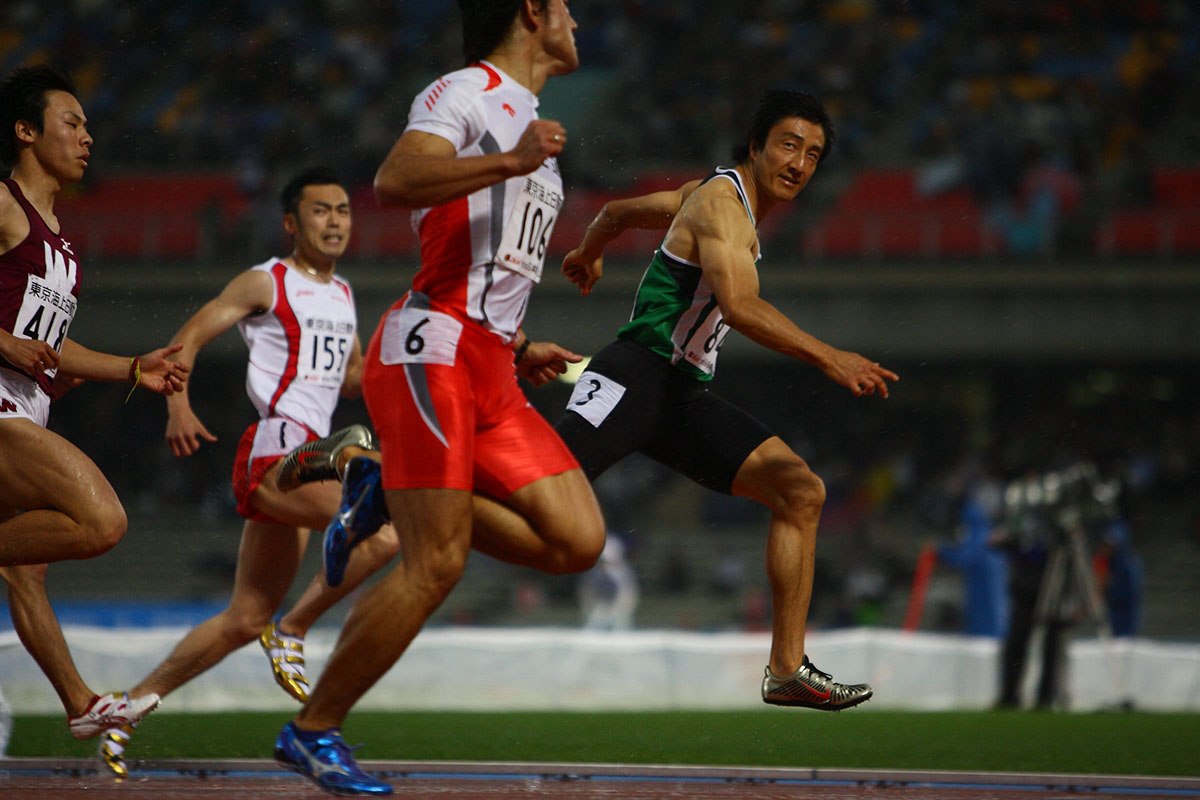
- Kanno (second from left) at the 2008 Japanese Championships

Personal information
- Nationality: Japanese
- Born: 13 December 1980 (age 45) Chiba Prefecture, Japan
- Education: Nihon University
- Height: 1.74 m (5 ft 9 in)
- Weight: 64 kg (141 lb)

Sport
- Country: Japan
- Sport: Track and field
- Event(s): 100 metres 200 metres
- Retired: 2008

Achievements and titles
- Personal best(s): 100 m: 10.22 (2003); 200 m: 20.89 (1999)
Medal record
Men's athletics
Representing Japan
Asian Junior Championships
Gold medal – first place	1999 Singapore	4×100 m relay

Yuta Kanno (菅野 優太, Kanno Yūta; born 13 December 1980 in Chiba Prefecture) is a Japanese former professional track and field sprinter. He finished sixth in the 100 metres at the 2002 Asian Championships and finished fourth in the 4 × 100 metres relay. He was also the 1999 Asian junior champion in the 4 × 100 metres relay and the 1999 Japanese junior champion in the 200 metres.

== Personal bests ==
Event	Time (s)	Competition	Venue	Date	Notes
100 m	10.22 (+1.6 m/s)	Japanese Championships	Yokohama, Japan	8 June 2003	
200 m	20.89 (+0.3 m/s)	Japanese University Championships	Tokyo, Japan	12 September 1999	
200 m	20.85 (+2.7 m/s)	Japanese Junior Championships	Kumamoto, Japan	2 October 1998	Wind-assisted

== International competition ==
Year	Competition	Venue	Position	Event	Time (s)
Representing Japan
1999	Asian Junior Championships	Singapore	5th	200 m	21.48 (wind: -0.3 m/s)
1999	Asian Junior Championships	Singapore	1st	4×100 m relay	39.86 (relay leg: 2nd)
2002	Asian Championships	Colombo, Sri Lanka	6th	100 m	10.75 (wind: -3.1 m/s)
2002	Asian Championships	Colombo, Sri Lanka	4th	4×100 m relay	39.41 (relay leg: 2nd)
