= Athletics at the 2001 Summer Universiade – Men's 4 × 100 metres relay =

The men's 4 × 100 metres relay event at the 2001 Summer Universiade was held at the Workers Stadium in Beijing, China between 29 August and 1 September.

== Results ==
=== Heats ===
| Rank | Heat | Nation | Athletes | Time | Notes |
|---|---|---|---|---|---|
| 1 | 2 | Japan | Yusuke Omae, Shingo Kawabata, Kenji Nara, Masayuki Okusako | 39.13 | Q |
| 2 | 1 | Cuba | Yuniel Hernández, José Carlos Peña, José Ángel César, Juan Pita | 39.34 | Q |
| 3 | 2 | Australia | Nigel Biggs, David Baxter, Tim Williams, Adam Basil | 39.39 | Q |
| 4 | 1 | Russia | Aleksander Ryabov, Aleksander Smirnov, Oleg Sergeyev, Sergey Bychkov | 39.62 | Q |
| 5 | 1 | Italy | Massimiliano Donati, Andrea Colombo, Andrea Rabino, Luca Verdecchia | 39.63 | Q |
| 6 | 1 | United States | Josh Norman, Gerald Williams, Kaaron Conwright, Josephus Howard | 39.73 | q |
| 7 | 2 | Namibia | Sylvester Nauta, Stephan Louw, Benedictus Botha, Sherwin Vries | 39.77 | Q |
| 8 | 2 | Thailand | Surachai Srijad, Ekkachai Janthana, Kongdech Natenee, Vissanu Sophanich | 40.25 | q |
| 9 | 1 | Nigeria | Njoteah Nnankec, Onyeabor Ngwogu, Joseph Eigbirimonleye, Isaac Uche | 40.37 | |
| 10 | 2 | Hong Kong | Chan Chi Hong, Lan Ming Tak, Ho Kwan Lung, Chan Ming Sang | 42.06 | |
| 11 | 2 | Oman | Said Al-Abadi, Mohamed Al-Shikeili, Alnobi Al-Kiyumi, Mansour Al-Anbary | 42.95 | |
| 12 | 1 | Macau | Lei Ka In, Wong Wai Ip, Law Leng Wai, Chong Ka Man | 43.66 | |
| | 2 | China | Wang Peng, Chen Haijian, Xu Zizhou, Yin Hanzhao | DQ | |
| | 1 | Brazil | | DNS | |

=== Final ===
| Rank | Nation | Athletes | Time | Notes |
|---|---|---|---|---|
| 1st place, gold medalist(s) | Japan | Shingo Kawabata, Kenji Nara, Yusuke Omae, Masayuki Okusako | 38.77 | |
| 2nd place, silver medalist(s) | United States | Gerald Williams, Marcus Brunson, Josh Norman, Kaaron Conwright | 39.14 | |
| 3rd place, bronze medalist(s) | Italy | Andrea Rabino, Massimiliano Donati, Andrea Colombo, Luca Verdecchia | 39.35 | |
| 4 | Namibia | Stephan Louw, Sherwin Vries, Benedictus Botha, Thobias Akwenye | 39.48 | NR |
| 5 | Australia | Adam Basil, Nigel Biggs, Tim Williams, David Baxter | 39.50 | |
| 6 | Russia | Aleksander Ryabov, Aleksander Smirnov, Sergey Bychkov, Oleg Sergeyev | 39.55 | |
| 7 | Thailand | Vissanu Sophanich, Surachai Srijad, Kongdech Natenee, Ekkachai Janthana | 39.80 | |
| | Cuba | José Ángel César, Yuniel Hernández, Juan Pita, José Carlos Peña | DNF | |
