= Yi Wei-chen =

Taiwanese sprinter

Yi Wei-chen (Chinese: 易緯鎮; born 28 August 1988) is a Taiwanese athlete who specialises in the sprinting events. He represented his country at the 2010 World Indoor Championships and 2011 World Championships.

== Competition record ==
Year	Competition	Venue	Position	Event	Notes
Representing Chinese Taipei
2005	World Youth Championships	Marrakesh, Morocco	28th (h)	100 m	10.88
2005	World Youth Championships	Marrakesh, Morocco	35th (h)	200 m	22.15
2005	World Youth Championships	Marrakesh, Morocco	6th (h)	Medley relay	1:54.02
2005	Asian Championships	Incheon, South Korea	9th (h)	4 × 400 m relay	3:15.21
2006	Asian Junior Championships	Macau, China	6th	200 m	22.04
2006	Asian Junior Championships	Macau, China	3rd	4 × 100 m relay	40.67
2006	World Junior Championships	Beijing, China	43rd (h)	100 m	10.76
2006	World Junior Championships	Beijing, China	31st (h)	200 m	21.75
2006	World Junior Championships	Beijing, China	15th (h)	4 × 100 m relay	40.33
2006	Asian Games	Doha, Qatar	10th (h)	200 m	21.71
2006	Asian Games	Doha, Qatar	4th	4 × 100 m relay	39.99
2006	Asian Games	Doha, Qatar	6th	4 × 400 m relay	3:12.03
2007	Asian Championships	Amman, Jordan	17th (h)	100 m	10.68
2007	Universiade	Bangkok, Thailand	26th (qf)	100 m	10.94
2009	Universiade	Belgrade, Serbia	22nd (qf)	100 m	10.66
2009	East Asian Games	Hong Kong, China	3rd	100 m	10.45
2009	East Asian Games	Hong Kong, China	1st	4 × 100 m relay	39.31
2010	World Indoor Championships	Doha, Qatar	35th (h)	60 m	6.96
2010	Asian Games	Guangzhou, China	17th (sf)	100 m	10.63
2010	Asian Games	Guangzhou, China	2nd	4 × 100 m relay	39.05
2011	Asian Championships	Kobe, Japan	3rd	4 × 100 m relay	39.30
2011	World Championships	Daegu, South Korea	16th (h)	4 × 100 m relay	39.30
2013	Asian Championships	Pune, India	5th	4 × 100 m relay	39.52

== Personal bests ==
Outdoor

- 100 metres – 10.28 (+1.2 m/s, Taipei City 2012)
- 200 metres – 20.91 (+1.3 m/s, Kaohsiung City 2012)

Indoor

- 60 metres – 6.96 (Doha 2010)
