= 2000 World Junior Championships in Athletics – Men's 200 metres =

The men's 200 metres event at the 2000 World Junior Championships in Athletics was held in Santiago, Chile, at Estadio Nacional Julio Martínez Prádanos on 19, 20 and 21 October.

== Medalists ==
Gold	Paul Gorries; South Africa
Silver	Marcin Jędrusiński; Poland
Bronze	Tim Benjamin; United Kingdom

== Results ==
=== Final ===
21 October
Wind: +1.3 m/s

Rank	Name	Nationality	Time	Notes
1st place, gold medalist(s)	Paul Gorries	South Africa	20.64	
2nd place, silver medalist(s)	Marcin Jędrusiński	Poland	20.87	
3rd place, bronze medalist(s)	Tim Benjamin	United Kingdom	20.94	
4	Omar Brown	Jamaica	21.04	
5	Yusuke Omae	Japan	21.05	
6	Marvin Anderson	Jamaica	21.06	
7	Dwayne Grant	United Kingdom	21.33	
8	Johan Engberg	Sweden	21.38	

=== Semifinals ===
20 October

==== Semifinal 1 ====
Wind: +1.2 m/s

Rank	Name	Nationality	Time	Notes
1	Yusuke Omae	Japan	20.81	Q
2	Marvin Anderson	Jamaica	20.84	Q
3	Johan Engberg	Sweden	20.87	Q
4	Dwayne Grant	United Kingdom	20.88	Q
5	Salem Al-Yami	Saudi Arabia	20.95	
6	Sebastian Gatzka	Germany	21.03	
7	Jiří Vojtík	Czech Republic	21.16	
8	Bruno Campos	Brazil	104.38	

==== Semifinal 2 ====
Wind: -0.5 m/s

Rank	Name	Nationality	Time	Notes
1	Paul Gorries	South Africa	20.62	Q
2	Marcin Jędrusiński	Poland	20.69	Q
3	Tim Benjamin	United Kingdom	20.76	Q
4	Omar Brown	Jamaica	20.90	Q
5	Yang Yaozu	China	20.96	
6	Tim Williams	Australia	21.33	
7	Yuji Okuno	Japan	30.91	
	Rae Edwards	United States	DNF	

=== Quarterfinals ===
19 October

==== Quarterfinal 1 ====
Wind: +0.5 m/s

Rank	Name	Nationality	Time	Notes
1	Omar Brown	Jamaica	21.06	Q
2	Yusuke Omae	Japan	21.15	Q
3	Johan Engberg	Sweden	21.19	Q
4	Dwayne Grant	United Kingdom	21.24	Q
5	Daniel Abenzoar-Foulé	France	21.45	
6	Marco Marsadri	Italy	21.67	
7	Harry Adu-Mfum	Ghana	21.78	
8	Dmitriy Chumichkin	Azerbaijan	22.25	

==== Quarterfinal 2 ====
Wind: -0.2 m/s

Rank	Name	Nationality	Time	Notes
1	Marvin Anderson	Jamaica	20.94	Q
2	Salem Al-Yami	Saudi Arabia	21.07	Q
3	Marcin Jędrusiński	Poland	21.13	Q
4	Yang Yaozu	China	21.21	Q
5	Ricardo Alves	Portugal	21.34	
6	Kostyantyn Vasyukov	Ukraine	21.50	
7	Johan Wissman	Sweden	21.55	
8	Gordon Kennedy	Ireland	21.58	

==== Quarterfinal 3 ====
Wind: +0.1 m/s

Rank	Name	Nationality	Time	Notes
1	Paul Gorries	South Africa	20.72	Q
2	Tim Benjamin	United Kingdom	20.77	Q
3	Sebastian Gatzka	Germany	21.18	Q
4	Yuji Okuno	Japan	21.21	Q
5	Guillermo Mayer	Chile	21.39	
6	Pedro Silva	Portugal	21.60	
7	Vladimir Demchenko	Ukraine	21.63	
8	Rubén Chávez	Mexico	21.70	

==== Quarterfinal 4 ====
Wind: -1.6 m/s

Rank	Name	Nationality	Time	Notes
1	Bruno Campos	Brazil	21.21	Q
2	Tim Williams	Australia	21.29	Q
3	Rae Edwards	United States	21.32	Q
4	Jiří Vojtík	Czech Republic	21.37	Q
5	Ronald Pognon	France	21.42	
6	Ommanandsingh Kowlessur	Mauritius	21.52	
7	Martín Rodríguez	Spain	21.70	
	Gareth Roelf	South Africa	DNS	

=== Heats ===
19 October

==== Heat 1 ====
Wind: +0.1 m/s

Rank	Name	Nationality	Time	Notes
1	Yang Yaozu	China	20.97	Q
2	Salem Al-Yami	Saudi Arabia	21.12	Q
3	Vladimir Demchenko	Ukraine	21.63	Q
4	Rubén Chávez	Mexico	21.78	Q
5	Helly Ollarves	Venezuela	22.07	
6	David Hamil	Cayman Islands	22.64	
	Marc Burns	Trinidad and Tobago	DNF	

==== Heat 2 ====
Wind: -1.1 m/s

Rank	Name	Nationality	Time	Notes
1	Bruno Campos	Brazil	21.27	Q
2	Yuji Okuno	Japan	21.40	Q
3	Marvin Anderson	Jamaica	21.42	Q
4	Johan Engberg	Sweden	21.49	Q
5	Martín Rodríguez	Spain	21.54	q
6	Hicham Chliyeh	Morocco	22.18	
7	Guillermo Dongo	Suriname	22.21	

==== Heat 3 ====
Wind: +0.3 m/s

Rank	Name	Nationality	Time	Notes
1	Paul Gorries	South Africa	21.13	Q
2	Daniel Abenzoar-Foulé	France	21.42	Q
3	Pedro Silva	Portugal	21.61	Q
4	Kostyantyn Vasyukov	Ukraine	21.62	Q
5	Liu Yuan-Kai	Chinese Taipei	22.15	
6	Turo Bourgery	Tahiti	22.29	
7	Ku King Kit	Hong Kong	22.62	

==== Heat 4 ====
Wind: -0.3 m/s

Rank	Name	Nationality	Time	Notes
1	Tim Benjamin	United Kingdom	21.15	Q
2	Sebastian Gatzka	Germany	21.36	Q
3	Ricardo Alves	Portugal	21.47	Q
4	Gareth Roelf	South Africa	21.70	Q
5	Dmitriy Chumichkin	Azerbaijan	21.97	q
6	Andrew Konai	Solomon Islands	23.59	
	Churandy Martina	Netherlands Antilles	DQ	IAAF rule 163.3

==== Heat 5 ====
Wind: +1.0 m/s

Rank	Name	Nationality	Time	Notes
1	Rae Edwards	United States	21.08	Q
2	Dwayne Grant	United Kingdom	21.34	Q
3	Marco Marsadri	Italy	21.48	Q
4	Gordon Kennedy	Ireland	21.56	Q
5	Melville Rogers	Saint Kitts and Nevis	23.09	
6	Darrel Brown	Trinidad and Tobago	52.84	

==== Heat 6 ====
Wind: -0.8 m/s

Rank	Name	Nationality	Time	Notes
1	Omar Brown	Jamaica	21.30	Q
2	Ronald Pognon	France	21.34	Q
3	Ommanandsingh Kowlessur	Mauritius	21.51	Q
4	Harry Adu-Mfum	Ghana	21.68	Q
5	Roland Kwitt	Austria	22.06	
6	Tal Mor	Israel	22.12	
7	Ville Vakkuri	Finland	28.39	

==== Heat 7 ====
Wind: -1.1 m/s

Rank	Name	Nationality	Time	Notes
1	Yusuke Omae	Japan	20.99	Q
2	Marcin Jędrusiński	Poland	21.25	Q
3	Jiří Vojtík	Czech Republic	21.31	Q
4	Tim Williams	Australia	21.42	Q
5	Guillermo Mayer	Chile	21.51	q
6	Johan Wissman	Sweden	21.78	q
7	Javier Baeza	Mexico	22.35	
8	Teina Teiti	Cook Islands	23.19	

== Participation ==
According to an unofficial count, 49 athletes from 39 countries participated in the event.

- Australia (1)
- Austria (1)
- Azerbaijan (1)
- Brazil (1)
- Cayman Islands (1)
- Chile (1)
- China (1)
- Chinese Taipei (1)
- Cook Islands (1)
- Czech Republic (1)
- Finland (1)
- France (2)
- Germany (1)
- Ghana (1)
- Hong Kong (1)
- Ireland (1)
- Israel (1)
- Italy (1)
- Jamaica (2)
- Japan (2)
- Mauritius (1)
- Mexico (2)
- Morocco (1)
- Netherlands Antilles (1)
- Poland (1)
- Portugal (2)
- Saint Kitts and Nevis (1)
- Saudi Arabia (1)
- Solomon Islands (1)
- South Africa (2)
- Spain (1)
- Suriname (1)
- Sweden (2)
- Tahiti (1)
- Trinidad and Tobago (2)
- Ukraine (2)
- United Kingdom (2)
- United States (1)
- Venezuela (1)
