= Brandon Simpson =

American sprinter (born 1981)

Medal record

Athletics

Representing Jamaica

World Championships
| Silver medal – second place | 2001 Edmonton | 4x400 m relay |
| Silver medal – second place | 2003 Paris | 4x400 m relay |
| Bronze medal – third place | 2005 Helsinki | 4x400 m relay |

CAC Championships
| Silver medal – second place | 2001 Guatemala City | 400 m |

World Junior Championships
| Gold medal – first place | 2000 Santiago | 4×400 m relay |
| Silver medal – second place | 2000 Santiago | 400 m |

CAC Junior Championships (U20)
| Gold medal – first place | 2000 San Juan | 400 m |
| Gold medal – first place | 2000 San Juan | 4x400 m relay |

Brandon Simpson (born 6 September 1981 in Florida, U.S.) is a sprinter who represents Bahrain, having previously represented Jamaica. He has won a bronze medal in 4 x 400 metres relay at three world championships; 2001, 2003 and 2005. He finished 6th in the individual 400 metres contest in 2005, and 5th at the 2004 Olympics.

Simpson was also selected as an alternate for Jamaica at the 2000 Summer Olympics, making him then the youngest ever Jamaican named for an Olympic team. Simpson ran for the George Mason Patriots track and field team and then transferred to the TCU Horned Frogs track and field program.

== Achievements ==
| Year | Competition | Venue | Position | Event | Notes |
Representing Jamaica
| 2000 | World Junior Championships | Santiago, Chile | 2nd | 400m | 45.73 |
| 2000 | World Junior Championships | Santiago, Chile | 1st | 4 × 400 m relay | 3:06.06 |
| 2001 | Central American and Caribbean Championships | Guatemala City, Guatemala | 2nd | 400 m | 45.46 |
| 2001 | World Championships | Edmonton, Canada | 2nd | 4 X 400 m | 2:58.39 |
| 2003 | World Championships | Paris, France | 2nd | 4 X 400 m | 2:59.60 |
| 2003 | World Athletics Final | Monte Carlo, Monaco | 7th | 400 m | 46.02 |
| 2004 | Olympic Games | Athens, Greece | 5th | 400 m | 44.76 |
| 2005 | World Championships | Helsinki, Finland | 6th | 400 m | 45.01 |
| 2005 | World Championships | Helsinki, Finland | 3rd | 4 X 400 m | 2:58.07 |
| 2005 | World Athletics Final | Monte Carlo, Monaco | 4th | 400 m | 44.86 |

=== Personal bests ===
- 400 metres – 44.64 s (2006)
