= 1999 Asian Junior Athletics Championships =

8th Asian Junior Championships
- Dates: 30 September – 3 October
- Host city: Singapore
- Level: Junior (under-20)
- Events: 43

The 1999 Asian Junior Athletics Championships was the eighth edition of the international athletics competition for Asian under-20 athletes, organised by the Asian Athletics Association. It took place from 30 September to 3 October in Singapore. A total of 43 events were contested, which were divided equally between male and female athletes aside from the men's 3000 metres steeplechase.

== Medal summary ==
=== Men ===
Event	Gold		Silver		Bronze	
100 metres	Kazuya Kitamura (JPN)	10.56	Yang Yaozu (CHN)	10.66	Shingo Suetsugu (JPN)	10.68
200 metres	Sittichai Suwonprateep (THA)	20.96	Yang Yaozu (CHN)	21.10	Yusuke Omae (JPN)	21.17
400 metres	Salah-el-Din Bakar (QAT)	45.85 CR	Hamdan Al-Bishi (KSA)	45.98	Mitsuhiro Sato (JPN)	46.75
800 metres	Salah Taib Fadlallah (KSA)	1:49.17	Mohammad Al-Azemi (KUW)	1:49.53	Binu Mathews (IND)	1:49.60
1500 metres	Abubaker Ali Kamal (QAT)	3:42.46 CR	Dou Zhaobo (CHN)	3:44.09	Zhao Yunhai (CHN)	3:45.86
5000 metres	Sun Hongru (CHN)	14:46.84	Mukhlid Al-Otaibi (KSA)	14:46.89	Abdulaziz Al-Ameri (QAT)	14:47.31
10,000 metres	Mukhlid Al-Otaibi (KSA)	30:11.05	Gojen Singh (IND)	30:30.91	Kazushi Hara (JPN)	31:11.03
110 metres hurdles	Katsuya Hagino (JPN)	14.42	Rouhollah Ashgari (IRI)	14.55	Yang Chia-Lin (TPE)	14.58
400 metres hurdles	Hisatoshi Hotta (JPN)	51.16	Li Zhijun (CHN)	51.70	Meng Yan (CHN)	52.09
3000 metres steeplechase	Said Al-Harasi (QAT)	8:54.65	Jassim Mohamed (UAE)	8:56.05	Sun Hongru (CHN)	8:59.70
4×100 m relay	Japan (JPN); Kazuya Kitamura; Yuta Kanno; Shingo Suetsugu; Yusuke Omae	39.86	Saudi Arabia (KSA)	40.18	Thailand (THA)	40.63
4×400 m relay	Japan (JPN); Mitsuhiro Sato; Naohiro Kawakita; Shinji Itabashi; Hisatoshi Hotta	3:07.38 CR	Saudi Arabia (KSA)	3:09.66	Qatar (QAT)	3:11.35
10,000 metres walk	Wang Shigang (CHN)	44:55.00	Gurdev Singh (IND)	44:55.73	Eiichi Yoshizawa (JPN)	45:15.17
High jump	Naoyuki Daigo (JPN)	2.21 m	Cui Kai (CHN)	2.15 m	Akio Fujiki (JPN)	2.15 m
Pole vault	Tatsuhiko Yasukawa (JPN)	5.20 m =CR	Shunsuke Shimo (JPN)	5.00 m	Liu Chun-Wei (TPE)	4.80 m
Long jump	Dong Baohua (CHN)	7.72 m	Son Il-Shik (KOR)	7.54 m	Keisuke Nakamura (JPN)	7.42 m
Triple jump	Mohd Abdulaziz (QAT)	16.21 m	Shen Wei (CHN)	15.76 m	Ibrahim Abubaker (QAT)	15.69 m
Shot put	Ahmed Gholoum (KUW)	17.87 m	Cong Wei (CHN)	17.58 m	Kuldeep Singh Mann (IND)	16.88 m
Discus throw	Rashid Shafi Al-Dosari (QAT)	55.28 m CR	Adel Saber Salem (UAE)	53.28 m	Yan Xiaoming (CHN)	52.59 m
Hammer throw	Dilshod Nazarov (TJK)	63.56 m	Shen Yi (CHN)	63.10 m	Vinod Singh Kumar (IND)	59.17 m
Javelin throw	Song Dong-Hyun (KOR)	71.88 m	Li Duanwu (CHN)	68.99 m	Park Jae-Myeong (KOR)	68.05 m
Decathlon	Ahmad Hassan Moussa (QAT)	7387 pts CR	Cao Wen (CHN)	7292 pts	Mohd Malik Ahmed Tobias (MAS)	6868 pts

=== Women ===
Event	Gold		Silver		Bronze	
100 metres	Qin Wangping (CHN)	11.55	Irene Joseph (INA)	11.89	Zhu Yuanhong (CHN)	12.12
200 metres	Qin Wangping (CHN)	23.80	Vinita Tripathi (IND)	24.51	Irene Joseph (INA)	24.64
400 metres	Cui Lin (CHN)	53.51	Yelena Piskunova (UZB)	54.43	Sathi Geetha (IND)	55.03
800 metres	Lee Ya-Hui (TPE)	2:06.47	Tomoko Matsushima (JPN)	2:07.08	Yan Junli (CHN)	2:07.96
1500 metres	Irina Podkorytova (KAZ)	4:22.61	Geeta Manral (IND)	4:25.25	Yan Junli (CHN)	4:25.51
5000 metres	Jong Yong-Ok (PRK)	16:55.28	Ri Myong Sil (PRK)	16:58.69	Kayoko Fukushi (JPN)	17:08.10
10,000 metres	Jin Li (CHN)	35:51.34	Jong Yong-Ok (PRK)	35:53.33	Ri Myong Sil (PRK)	35:57.70
100 metres hurdles	Takako Baba (JPN)	14.07	Liu Li (CHN)	14.07	Lin Yueh-Chin (TPE)	14.54
400 metres hurdles	Yang Junli (CHN)	59.36	Yelena Piskunova (UZB)	59.90	Li Shuju (CHN)	59.93
4×100 m relay	China (CHN); Liu Li; Zhu Yuanhong; Cui Lin; Qin Wangping	46.05	India (IND)	46.22	Japan (JPN)	46.46
4×400 m relay	China (CHN); Li Shuju; Yang Junli; Yan Junli; Cui Lin	3:39.50	India (IND)	3:41.62	Japan (JPN)	3:42.55
10,000 metres walk	Li Yurui (CHN)	51:20.39	Mayumi Kawasaki (JPN)	52:36.98	Ha Mingming (CHN)	53:09.82
High jump	Tatyana Efimenko (KGZ)	1.88 m =CR	Netnapa Thaiking (THA)	1.83 m	Wang Chen (CHN)	1.81 m
Pole vault	Tang Junmei (CHN)	4.10 m	Chang Ko-Hsin (TPE)	4.00 m	Kuan Mei-Lien (TPE)	3.80 m
Long jump	Pan Wangxing (CHN)	6.20 m	Olessya Belyayeva (KAZ)	6.09 m	Takako Baba (JPN)	6.08 m
Triple jump	Viktoriya Brigadnaya (TKM)	13.97 m	Anna Tarasova (KAZ)	13.76 m	Yu Shaohua (CHN)	13.25 m
Shot put	Li Meiju (CHN)	16.45 m	Hong Mei (CHN)	15.34 m	Chinatsu Mori (JPN)	15.06 m
Discus throw	Xu Shaoyang (CHN)	52.74 m	Harwant Kaur (IND)	51.24 m	Liu Yanxia (CHN)	51.22 m
Hammer throw	Cui Xiaohong (CHN)	58.93 m	Masumi Aya (JPN)	52.22 m	Liu Hsiang-Chun (TPE)	49.63 m
Javelin throw	Du Beibei (CHN)	55.30 m	Liu Lin (CHN)	52.36 m	Chen Chia-Yu (TPE)	46.23 m
Heptathlon	Irina Naumenko (KAZ)	5557 pts CR	Wassana Winatho (THA)	5325 pts	Fumiko Kato (JPN)	5000 pts

== 1999 Medal Table ==
Rank	Nation	Gold	Silver	Bronze	Total
1	China (CHN)	17	13	12	42
2	Japan (JPN)	8	4	13	25
3	Qatar (QAT)	6	0	3	9
4	Saudi Arabia (KSA)	2	4	0	6
5	Kazakhstan (KAZ)	2	2	0	4
6	North Korea (PRK)	1	2	1	4
6	Thailand (THA)	1	2	1	4
8	Chinese Taipei (TPE)	1	1	6	8
9	South Korea (KOR)	1	1	1	3
10	Kuwait (KUW)	1	1	0	2
11	Kyrgyzstan (KGZ)	1	0	0	1
11	Tajikistan (TJK)	1	0	0	1
11	Turkmenistan (TKM)	1	0	0	1
14	India (IND)	0	7	4	11
15	United Arab Emirates (UAE)	0	2	0	2
15	Uzbekistan (UZB)	0	2	0	2
17	Indonesia (INA)	0	1	1	2
18	Iran (IRI)	0	1	0	1
19	Malaysia (MAS)	0	0	1	1
Totals (19 entries)		43	43	43	129
