= Shingo Suetsugu =

Japanese sprinter

Suetsugu Shingo
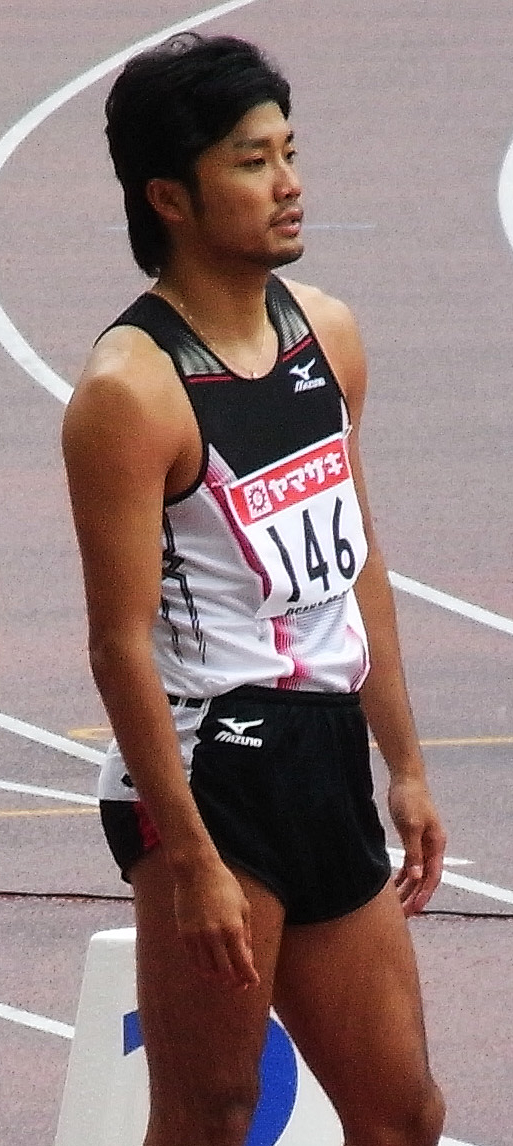

Personal information
- Nationality: Japan
- Born: 2 June 1980 (age 46) Kumamoto, Kumamoto Prefecture, Japan
- Height: 1.78 m (5 ft 10 in)
- Weight: 68 kg (150 lb)

Sport
- Sport: Track and field
- Event(s): 100 metres, 200 metres
- University team: Tokai University

Achievements and titles
- Personal bests: 100 m: 10.03 (Mito 2003) 200 m: 20.03 (Yokohama 2003) NR 400 m: 45.99 (Machida 2002)
Medal record
Men's athletics
Representing Japan
Olympics
Silver medal – second place	2008 Beijing	4×100 m relay
World Championships
Bronze medal – third place	2003 Paris	200 m
Asian Games
Gold medal – first place	2002 Busan	200 m
Gold medal – first place	2006 Doha	200 m
Silver medal – second place	2002 Busan	4×100 m relay
Silver medal – second place	2006 Doha	4×100 m relay
Asian Championships
Gold medal – first place	2005 Incheon	4×100 m relay
Silver medal – second place	2005 Incheon	100 m
Afro-Asian Games
Bronze medal – third place	2003 Hyderabad	100 m
East Asian Games
Gold medal – first place	2001 Osaka	200 m
Gold medal – first place	2001 Osaka	4×100 m relay
Asian Junior Championships
Gold medal – first place	1999 Singapore	4×100 m relay
Bronze medal – third place	1999 Singapore	100 m
Representing Asia
World Cup
Bronze medal – third place	2006 Athens	200 m
Bronze medal – third place	2006 Athens	4×100 m relay

Shingo Suetsugu (末續 慎吾, Suetsugu Shingo; born 2 June 1980 in Kumamoto) is a Japanese sprinter. He is a former Asian record holder in the 200 metres and 4×100 metres relay.

== Running career ==
Suetsugu won a bronze medal in the 200 metres event at the 2003 IAAF World Championships in a time of 20.38 seconds. The same year he set an Asian record of 20.03 seconds at the Japanese national championships, and also won the 100 metres in 10.13 seconds. Participating in the 2004 Summer Olympics, he reached the second round in the 100 metres.

=== Olympics ===
Suetsugu represented Japan at the 2008 Summer Olympics in Beijing. He competed at the 4×100 metres relay together with Naoki Tsukahara, Shinji Takahira and Nobuharu Asahara. In their qualification heat they placed second behind Trinidad and Tobago, but in front of the Netherlands and Brazil. Their time of 38.52 was the third fastest out of sixteen participating nations in the first round, and they qualified for the final. There they sprinted to a time of 38.15 seconds, the third fastest after the Jamaican and Trinidad teams, winning the bronze medal. The medal was upgraded to a silver after the Jamaicans were DQ'ed due to Nesta Carter's positive doping sample. Suetsugu also took part in the 200 metres individual race, finishing sixth in his first round heat, with a time of 20.93 seconds, which was not enough to qualify for the second round.

== Personal bests ==
Event	Time	Wind	Venue	Date	Notes
100 m	10.03 s	+1.8 m/s	Mito, Japan	5 May 2003	Japan's 5th-fastest time
200 m	20.03 s	+0.6 m/s	Yokohama, Japan	7 June 2003	Japan's record
400 m	45.99 s		Machida, Japan	18 August 2002	

== Records ==
- 100 metres
  - Former Japanese university record holder - 10.05 s (wind: +1.9 m/s) (Mito, 6 May 2002)
- 200 metres
  - Former Asian record holder - 20.03 s (wind: +0.6 m/s) (Yokohama, 7 June 2003)
  - Current Japanese record holder - 20.03 s (wind: +0.6 m/s) (Yokohama, 7 June 2003)
  - Former Japanese university record holder - 20.26 s (wind: -0.9 m/s) (Yokohama, 9 September 2000)
- 4 × 100 m relay
  - Former Asian record holder - 38.03 s (relay leg: 2nd) (Osaka, 1 September 2007)^{[a]}
  - Former Japanese university record holder - 38.57 s (relay leg: 2nd) (Tokyo, 29 September 2001)^{[b]}
- Medley relay (100m×200m×300m×400m)
  - Former Japanese university record holder - 1:50.21 s (relay leg: 2nd) (Yokohama, 15 September 2001)

^{a} with Naoki Tsukahara, Shinji Takahira, and Nobuharu Asahara
^{b} with Hisashi Miyazaki, Toshiyuki Fujimoto, and Masayuki Okusako

== International competition record ==
Year	Competition	Venue	Position	Event	Notes
Representing Japan
1999	Asian Junior Championships	Singapore	3rd	100 m	10.68 (wind: -0.1 m/s)
1999	Asian Junior Championships	Singapore	1st	4 × 100 m relay	39.86 (relay leg: 3rd)
2000	Olympics	Sydney, Australia	14th (sf)	200 m	20.69 (wind: +0.3 m/s)
2000	Olympics	Sydney, Australia	6th	4 × 100 m relay	38.66 (relay leg: 3rd)
2001	East Asian Games	Osaka, Japan	1st	200 m	20.34 (wind: 0.0 m/s) GR
2001	East Asian Games	Osaka, Japan	1st	4 × 100 m relay	38.93 (relay leg: 3rd) GR
2001	World Championships	Edmonton, Canada	10th (sf)	200 m	20.39 (wind: +0.7 m/s)
2001	World Championships	Edmonton, Canada	4th	4 × 100 m relay	38.96 (relay leg: 2nd)
2002	Asian Games	Busan, South Korea	1st	200 m	20.38 (wind: 0.0 m/s)
2002	Asian Games	Busan, South Korea	2nd	4 × 100 m relay	38.90 (relay leg: 2nd)
2003	World Championships	Saint-Denis, France	3rd	200 m	20.38 (wind: +0.1 m/s)
2003	Afro-Asian Games	Hyderabad, India	3rd	100 m	10.36 (wind: -0.6 m/s)
2004	Olympics	Athens, Greece	17th (qf)	100 m	10.19 (wind: 0.0 m/s)
2004	Olympics	Athens, Greece	4th	4 × 100 m relay	38.49 (relay leg: 2nd)
2005	World Championships	Helsinki, Finland	11th (sf)	200 m	20.84 (wind: -0.3 m/s)
2005	World Championships	Helsinki, Finland	8th	4 × 100 m relay	38.77 (relay leg: 1st)
2005	Asian Championships	Incheon, South Korea	2nd	100 m	10.42 (wind: -0.3 m/s)
2005	Asian Championships	Incheon, South Korea	1st	4 × 100 m relay	39.10 (relay leg: 4th)
2006	World Cup	Athens, Greece	3rd	200 m	20.30 (wind: +0.1 m/s)
2006	World Cup	Athens, Greece	3rd	4 × 100 m relay	38.51 (relay leg: 2nd)
2006	Asian Games	Doha, Qatar	1st	200 m	20.60 (wind: +0.7 m/s)
2006	Asian Games	Doha, Qatar	2nd	4 × 100 m relay	39.21 (relay leg: 2nd)
2007	World Championships	Osaka, Japan	19th (qf)	200 m	20.70 (wind: +0.9 m/s)
2007	World Championships	Osaka, Japan	5th	4 × 100 m relay	38.03 (relay leg: 2nd) AR
2008	Olympics	Beijing, China	34th (h)	200 m	20.93 (wind: -0.7 m/s)
2008	Olympics	Beijing, China	2nd	4 × 100 m relay	38.15 (relay leg: 2nd)

== National championships ==
He has won the individual national championship 6 times:

- 2 wins in the 100 metres (2003, 2004)
- 4 wins in the 200 metres (2001, 2003, 2006, 2007)
