= 2003 Asian Athletics Championships – Men's 200 metres =

The men's 200 metres event at the 2003 Asian Athletics Championships was held in Manila, the Philippines, on September 22–23.

== Medalists ==
Gold	Silver	Bronze
Fawzi Al-Shammari; Kuwait	Hamed Hamadan Al-Bishi; Saudi Arabia	Yang Yaozu; China

== Results ==
=== Heats ===
Wind: Heat 1: +1.5 m/s, Heat 2: +0.7 m/s, Heat 3: +2.4 m/s, Heat 4: +0.4 m/s

Rank	Heat	Name	Nationality	Time	Notes
1	4	Hamed Hamadan Al-Bishi	Saudi Arabia	20.96	Q
2	2	Hamdan Odha Al-Bishi	Saudi Arabia	21.02	Q
3	4	Gennadiy Chernovol	Kazakhstan	21.07	Q
4	1	Fawzi Al-Shammari	Kuwait	21.10	Q
5	1	Yang Yaozu	China	21.12	Q
6	3	He Jun	China	21.14	Q
7	2	Yusuke Omae	Japan	21.23	Q
8	1	Prasanna Amarasekara	Sri Lanka	21.26	Q
9	3	Tatsuro Yoshino	Japan	21.27	Q
10	2	Sethuwa Nimal Hemantha	Sri Lanka	21.31	Q
11	1	Jhon Herman Muray	Indonesia	21.35	q
12	4	Tsai Meng-Lin	Chinese Taipei	21.49	Q
13	2	Jimar Aing	Philippines	21.50	q, PB
14	1	Liu Yuan-Kai	Chinese Taipei	21.56	q
15	4	Mohammad Akefian	Iran	21.58	q
16	2	Sykham Silapaseuth	Laos	21.71	PB
17	3	Cho Young-Wook	South Korea	21.82	Q
18	1	Le Ngoc Thanh	Vietnam	21.84	PB
19	3	Juma Mubarak Al-Jabri	Oman	21.95	
20	3	Nazmizan Mohamad	Malaysia	21.97	
21	3	Mohamed Masudul Karim	Bangladesh	21.97	
22	4	Chao Un Kei	Macau	22.15	SB
22	4	Lin Jingze	Singapore	22.20	PB
23	1	Henry Dagmil	Philippines	22.29	SB
24	2	Sittichai Suwonprateep	Thailand	23.77	
25	2	Hamood Al-Dalhami	Oman	24.01	
26	3	Umar Ibrahim	Maldives	24.73	

=== Semifinals ===
Wind: Heat 1: -0.1 m/s, Heat 2: +0.6 m/s

Rank	Heat	Name	Nationality	Time	Notes
1	2	Fawzi Al-Shammari	Kuwait	20.81	Q
2	2	Yang Yaozu	China	20.88	Q
3	2	Hamdan Odha Al-Bishi	Saudi Arabia	20.99	Q, SB
4	1	Hamed Hamadan Al-Bishi	Saudi Arabia	21.07	Q
5	1	Tatsuro Yoshino	Japan	21.21	Q
6	2	Yusuke Omae	Japan	21.22	Q
7	2	Sethuwa Nimal Hemantha	Sri Lanka	21.23	
8	1	He Jun	China	21.38	Q
9	1	Prasanna Amarasekara	Sri Lanka	21.39	Q
10	1	Mohammad Akefian	Iran	21.50	
11	1	Tsai Meng-Lin	Chinese Taipei	21.52	
12	2	Jimar Aing	Philippines	21.54	
13	1	Jhon Herman Muray	Indonesia	21.68	
14	2	Liu Yuan-Kai	Chinese Taipei	21.75	
15	1	Cho Young-Wook	South Korea	21.95	
	2	Gennadiy Chernovol	Kazakhstan	DNF	

=== Final ===
Wind: 0.0 m/s

Rank	Name	Nationality	Time	Notes
1st place, gold medalist(s)	Fawzi Al-Shammari	Kuwait	20.70	
2nd place, silver medalist(s)	Hamed Hamadan Al-Bishi	Saudi Arabia	20.73	
3rd place, bronze medalist(s)	Yang Yaozu	China	20.82	
4	He Jun	China	21.10	
5	Tatsuro Yoshino	Japan	21.14	
6	Yusuke Omae	Japan	21.26	
7	Hamdan Odha Al-Bishi	Saudi Arabia	21.39	
8	Prasanna Amarasekara	Sri Lanka	21.52	
