= Ommanandsing Kowlessur =

Mauritian sprinter

Ommanandsing Kowlessur (born March 29, 1982) is a Mauritian athlete competing in the 200 and 400 metres. He placed fifth in the 400 metres at the 2005 Francophone Games, held in Niamey, Niger. In 2006, Kowlessur placed fourth in the 4 × 100 m relay at the Commonwealth Games in Melbourne, Australia.

== Achievements ==
Year	Competition	Venue	Position	Event	Notes
Representing Mauritius
2000	Championnats Nationaux Vital	Reduit, Mauritius	1st	200 m	21.56
2000	World Junior Championships	Santiago, Chile	22nd (qf)	200 m	21.52 (wind: -1.6 m/s)
2001	African Junior Athletics Championships	Reduit, Mauritius	1st	200 m Final	21.66
2001	African Junior Athletics Championships	Reduit, Mauritius	5th	400 m Final	48.53
2002	Championnats de France d'athletisme	Saint-Etienne, France	8th	200 m	21.82
2002	13th African Championships in Athletics	Rades, Tunisia	5th	200 m Semifinal	21.57
2002	Commonwealth Games	Manchester, England	6th	4 × 100 m Semifinal	40.05
2003	Championnats Nationaux Vital	Reduit, Mauritius	1st	400 m	48.21
2004	Championnats Nationaux Vital	Reduit, Mauritius	1st	200 m	21.88
2005	Championnats Nationaux Vital	Reduit, Mauritius	1st	400 m	48.87
2005	Francophone Games	Niamey, Niger	5th	400 m Final	47.62
2005	Francophone Games	Niamey, Niger	3rd	4 × 100 m Final	40.28
2005	Francophone Games	Niamey, Niger	2nd	4 × 400 m Final	3:07.18
2006	Commonwealth Games	Melbourne, Australia	4th	4 × 100 m Final	39.97
2006	Commonwealth Games	Melbourne, Australia	5th	4 × 400 m Heat	3:08:19
2007	All-Africa Games	Algiers, Algeria	7th	200 m Semifinal	21.91
