= Simeon Williamson =

English bobsledder & track and field sprinter

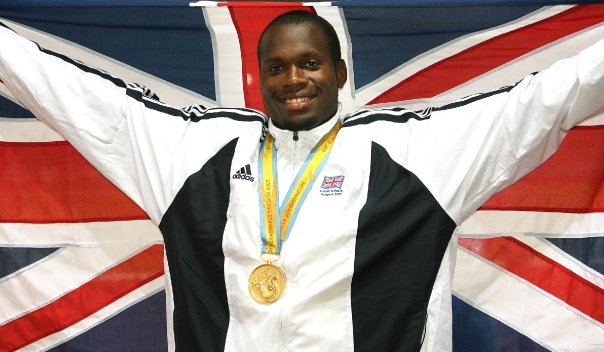
- Gold medal at World Student Games

Personal information
- Nationality: British (English)
- Born: 16 January 1986 (age 40) Islington, England
- Height: 185 cm (6 ft 1 in)
- Weight: 95 kg (14 st 13 lb; 209 lb)

Sport
- Sport: Athletics bobsleigh
- Event(s): 100 metres, 200 metres
- Club: Highgate Harriers

Achievements and titles
- Personal best(s): 60 m: 6.53 100 m: 10.03 200 m: 21.25
Medal record
Representing Great Britain
World Championships
| Bronze medal – third place | 2009 Berlin | 4 × 100 m relay |
Summer Universiade
| Gold medal – first place | 2007 Bangkok | 100 m |
European U23 Championships
| Gold medal – first place | 2007 Debrecen | 100 m |

Simeon Oscar Williamson (born 16 January 1986) is an English bobsledder and former track and field sprinter who specialised in the 100 metres. Williamson, a London native, is the second cousin to 2008 Beijing Olympics silver medalist British high jumper Germaine Mason. He is coached by Lloyd Cowan, and his athletics club is Highgate Harriers. He is a former British 100 metres champion.

== Career ==
He won the silver at the European Junior Championships in 2005, 1/100 of a second behind Craig Pickering, to complete a British 1–2–3 with third placed Alex Nelson. In 2007 he became European Athletics Under-23 Champion in the 100 m, clocking a personal best of 10.10 seconds and edging out compatriot Pickering in a British 1–2. He won the 100 m race at the 2007 Summer Universiade.

In 2008 he finished seventh in 60 metres at the World Indoor Championships. That year, Williamson was featured in a BBC documentary called Sprint, along with other 100 m hopefuls Pickering, Harry Aikines-Aryeetey and Wade Bennett-Jackson. Williamson represented Team GB in the 2008 Beijing Olympics in the 100 m and the 4 × 100 metres relay. He was second in the trials behind Dwain Chambers, running a new personal best of 10.03 seconds. However, following a minor injury at the team's training camp he was less successful in the Olympics. He failed to match his trials form and went out at the quarter-final stage. Together with Tyrone Edgar, Marlon Devonish and Pickering he also competed at the 4 × 100 m relay. In their qualification heat they were disqualified and eliminated for dropping the baton.

=== National champion ===
At the 2009 Birmingham Grand Prix Williamson won the 60 m and improved his personal best to 6.53 seconds. He was selected to compete at the European Indoor Championships in Turin and finished a close fourth in the 60 m final with 6.57 s. In the outdoor season in June, Williamson ran the 100 m in 10.09 seconds at the Fanny Blankers-Koen Games. This was the second fastest time by a European at that point in the season. Following this he finished second to world-leader Daniel Bailey at the ISTAF meet in Berlin; the first ÅF Golden League of the season.

Williamson won his first national championships in July. He broke Dwain Chambers' domination of the British 100 m with a strong run into the wind. His time of 10.05 seconds was not a personal best, but it surely would have been had he not been hampered by a −1.8 m/s wind. Williamson was pleased with his first national title, having finished as runner-up a number of times, and turned his attention to a further Golden League meet against Usain Bolt. He did not repeat his national championships' form on the European circuit, running 10.14 seconds for sixth place at the Meeting Areva, although a fourth place at the London Grand Prix with 10.19 seconds into a strong headwind was an improvement.

At the 2009 World Championships, Williamson failed to live up to expectations and was eliminated in the quarter-finals of the competition, recording 10.23 seconds after suffering a cramp. However, success came in the form of a relay medal, as he led off a team including Tyrone Edgar, Marlon Devonish and Harry Aikines-Aryeetey, and won the bronze, his first international relay medal. After the championships he took third at the Rieti IAAF Grand Prix, but finished last by some distance at the 2009 IAAF World Athletics Final. Although, he had won his first national championship that year, he had peaked outside of the major competitions. He stated that he was not sure how he had managed his 10.05 seconds win, but announced that he would return to Jamaica for a winter training camp to try to improve his consistency for the following season.

He missed the 2010 season, including the 2010 Commonwealth Games, due to knee injury and surgery. He returned to Jamaica for rehabilitation but missed the 2011 season after the recurrence of an injury.

In addition to sprinting, Williamson has also competed as a push athlete in bobsledding, and was selected as a member of the British team for the 2015 FIBT World Championships where he finished in 14th in the two-man event with Lamin Deen and eighth along with the rest of the British squad in the team event.

== Personal bests ==
| Event | Best | Location | Date |
|---|---|---|---|
| 60 metres | 6.53 s | Birmingham, England | 21 February 2009 |
| 100 metres | 10.03 s | Birmingham, England | 12 July 2008 |
| 200 metres (indoor) | 21.55 s | Birmingham, England | 20 February 2005 |
| 200 metres (outdoor) | 21.25 s | Geneva, Switzerland | 6 June 2009 |
