= 2000 World Junior Championships in Athletics – Men's 400 metres =

The men's 400 metres event at the 2000 World Junior Championships in Athletics was held in Santiago, Chile, at Estadio Nacional Julio Martínez Prádanos on 17, 18 and 20 October.

== Medalists ==
Gold	Hamdan Al-Bishi; Saudi Arabia
Silver	Brandon Simpson; Jamaica
Bronze	Shinji Ishikawa; Japan

== Results ==
=== Final ===
20 October

Rank	Name	Nationality	Time	Notes
1st place, gold medalist(s)	Hamdan Al-Bishi	Saudi Arabia	44.66	
2nd place, silver medalist(s)	Brandon Simpson	Jamaica	45.73	
3rd place, bronze medalist(s)	Shinji Ishikawa	Japan	45.77	
4	Damion Barry	Trinidad and Tobago	45.86	
5	William Hernández	Venezuela	45.94	
6	Richard Sharp	South Africa	45.97	
7	Jonathan Palma	Venezuela	46.36	
8	Rafał Wieruszewski	Poland	46.37	

=== Semifinals ===
18 October

==== Semifinal 1 ====
Rank	Name	Nationality	Time	Notes
1	Damion Barry	Trinidad and Tobago	46.63	Q
2	Rafał Wieruszewski	Poland	46.66	Q
3	Shinji Ishikawa	Japan	46.99	Q
4	Jonathan Palma	Venezuela	47.10	Q
5	Tshepo Thobelangope	South Africa	47.18	
6	Gordon Kennedy	Ireland	47.37	
7	Bastian Swillims	Germany	47.43	
8	Vladimir Demchenko	Ukraine	47.54	

==== Semifinal 2 ====
Rank	Name	Nationality	Time	Notes
1	Hamdan Al-Bishi	Saudi Arabia	45.69	Q
2	Brandon Simpson	Jamaica	45.96	Q
3	William Hernández	Venezuela	46.77	Q
4	Richard Sharp	South Africa	46.83	Q
5	Sherridan Kirk	Trinidad and Tobago	47.08	
6	Shinji Itabashi	Japan	47.67	
7	Bruno Ediarimalala	Madagascar	47.91	
8	James Graham	United States	49.64	

=== Heats ===
17 October

==== Heat 1 ====
Rank	Name	Nationality	Time	Notes
1	Hamdan Al-Bishi	Saudi Arabia	46.63	Q
2	Gordon Kennedy	Ireland	46.94	Q
3	Jonathan Palma	Venezuela	47.27	q
4	Mark Ormrod	Australia	47.66	
5	Richard Petzold	Germany	48.96	
6	David Neilsen	Guam	49.99	
7	Melville Rogers	Saint Kitts and Nevis	51.18	

==== Heat 2 ====
Rank	Name	Nationality	Time	Notes
1	Brandon Simpson	Jamaica	46.64	Q
2	Bastian Swillims	Germany	47.06	Q
3	David Melo	Spain	47.96	
4	Marcelo Figueroa	El Salvador	47.99	
5	Alexis Roberts	Bahamas	49.02	
6	Liu Yuan-Kai	Chinese Taipei	49.06	
	Japheth Ogamba	Kenya	DQ	IAAF rule 163.3

==== Heat 3 ====
Rank	Name	Nationality	Time	Notes
1	Damion Barry	Trinidad and Tobago	46.62	Q
2	Tshepo Thobelangope	South Africa	46.81	Q
3	Bruno Ediarimalala	Madagascar	46.83	q
4	Urel Lacroix	France	47.34	
5	Dmitriy Petrov	Russia	47.66	
6	Jesús Torres	Puerto Rico	48.58	
7	Khalid Brooks	Anguilla	53.09	
	Sándor Gombos	Hungary	DQ	IAAF rule 163.3

==== Heat 4 ====
Rank	Name	Nationality	Time	Notes
1	William Hernández	Venezuela	46.52	Q
2	Rafał Wieruszewski	Poland	46.64	Q
3	Vladimir Demchenko	Ukraine	47.10	q
4	Cameron Brown	Australia	47.36	
5	Florin Suciu	Romania	47.44	
6	Nathan Justin	Saint Lucia	49.66	
7	Shane Ogumoro	Northern Mariana Islands	56.72	

==== Heat 5 ====
Rank	Name	Nationality	Time	Notes
1	Shinji Itabashi	Japan	47.37	Q
2	James Graham	United States	48.06	Q
3	Sebastián Martínez	Chile	48.21	
4	Sam Higgie	New Zealand	48.31	
5	David Hamil	Cayman Islands	49.97	
6	Lucien Kramar	Guinea	52.94	

==== Heat 6 ====
Rank	Name	Nationality	Time	Notes
1	Shinji Ishikawa	Japan	46.53	Q
2	Richard Sharp	South Africa	46.84	Q
3	Sherridan Kirk	Trinidad and Tobago	47.06	q
4	Abdellatif El-Ghazaoui	Morocco	48.35	
5	Hamed Al-Bishi	Saudi Arabia	48.40	
6	Elton Spain	United States	50.03	
7	Ku King Kit	Hong Kong	51.92	

== Participation ==
According to an unofficial count, 42 athletes from 34 countries participated in the event.

- Anguilla (1)
- Australia (2)
- Bahamas (1)
- Cayman Islands (1)
- Chile (1)
- Chinese Taipei (1)
- El Salvador (1)
- France (1)
- Germany (2)
- Guam (1)
- Guinea (1)
- Hong Kong (1)
- Hungary (1)
- Ireland (1)
- Jamaica (1)
- Japan (2)
- Kenya (1)
- Madagascar (1)
- Morocco (1)
- New Zealand (1)
- Northern Mariana Islands (1)
- Poland (1)
- Puerto Rico (1)
- Romania (1)
- Russia (1)
- Saint Kitts and Nevis (1)
- Saint Lucia (1)
- Saudi Arabia (2)
- South Africa (2)
- Spain (1)
- Trinidad and Tobago (2)
- Ukraine (1)
- United States (2)
- Venezuela (2)
