= Hamed Al-Bishi =

Saudi Arabian sprinter

Hamed Hamadan Al-Bishi
Personal information
- Born: 3 March 1982 (age 44) Saudi Arabia
- Height: 1.85 m (6 ft 1 in)
- Weight: 67 kg (148 lb)

Achievements and titles
- Personal bests: 200 m – 20.55 (2003); 300 m – 33.28 (2002); 400 m – 45.62 (2004); 400 m hurdles – 50.94 (2001)
Medal record
Men's athletics
Representing Saudi Arabia
Asian Championships
Gold medal – first place	2005 Incheon	200 m
Silver medal – second place	2003 Manila	200 m
Bronze medal – third place	2000 Jakarta	4 × 400 m
Bronze medal – third place	2005 Incheon	4 × 100 m

Hamed Hamadan Al-Bishi (born 3 March 1982) is a Saudi track and field athlete who specialises in sprint running. He won a gold medal in 4 × 400 m relay at the 2002 Asian Games and became Asian champion over 200 metres in 2005. He also competed in the men's 4 × 400 metres relay at the 2000 Summer Olympics.

== Achievements ==
Year	Competition	Venue	Position	Event	Notes
Representing Saudi Arabia
2000	Asian Championships	Jakarta, Indonesia	3rd	4 × 400 m relay	3:05.00
2000	Olympic Games	Sydney, Australia	28th (h)	4 × 400 m relay	3:09.57
2000	World Junior Championships	Santiago, Chile	27th (h)	400 m	48.40
2001	Asian Junior Championships	Bandar Seri Begawan, Brunei	1st	200 m	46.16
2001	Asian Junior Championships	Bandar Seri Begawan, Brunei	1st	400 m hurdles	50.94
2001	World Championships	Edmonton, Canada	17th (h)	4 × 400 m relay	3:04.22
2002	Asian Championships	Colombo, Sri Lanka	6th	200 m	21.32
2002	Asian Games	Busan, South Korea	7th	200 m	21.10
2002	Asian Games	Busan, South Korea	1st	4 × 400 m relay	3:02.47
2003	World Championships	Paris, France	15th (sf)	200 m	20.70
2003	Asian Championships	Manila, Philippines	2nd	200 m	20.73
2004	Pan Arab Games	Algiers, Algeria	1st	200 m	20.81
2004	Pan Arab Games	Algiers, Algeria	1st	4 × 100 m relay	39.40
2004	Pan Arab Games	Algiers, Algeria	1st	4 × 400 m relay	3:03.03
2005	Islamic Solidarity Games	Mecca, Saudi Arabia	1st	200 m	20.72
2005	Islamic Solidarity Games	Mecca, Saudi Arabia	1st	4 × 400 m relay	3:04.35
2005	World Championships	Helsinki, Finland	33rd (h)	200 m	21.03
2005	Asian Championships	Incheon, South Korea	1st	200 m	20.66
2005	Asian Championships	Incheon, South Korea	3rd	4 × 100 m relay	39.25
2005	Asian Championships	Incheon, South Korea	3rd (h)	4 × 400 m relay	3:11.13
2006	Asian Games	Doha, Qatar	4th	200 m	20.83
2006	Asian Games	Doha, Qatar	1st	4 × 400 m relay	3:05.31
2007	Asian Indoor Games	Macau	5th	400 m	48.37
2007	Asian Indoor Games	Macau	1st	4 × 400 m relay	3:11.29
2007	Pan Arab Games	Cairo, Egypt	5th	200 m	21.28
2007	Pan Arab Games	Cairo, Egypt	1st	4 × 400 m relay	3:04.74
2009	World Championships	Berlin, Germany	32nd (h)	200 m	21.00
2009	Asian Championships	Guangzhou, China	4th	200 m	21.11
2009	Asian Championships	Guangzhou, China	4th	4 × 400 m relay	3:06.95
2009	Asian Indoor Games	Hanoi, Vietnam	1st	4 × 400 m relay	3:10.31 (NR)
2010	West Asian Championships	Aleppo, Syria	5th	200 m	21.54
2010	West Asian Championships	Aleppo, Syria	1st	4 × 400 m relay	3:06.97
2010	Asian Games	Guangzhou, China	18th (h)	200 m	21.89
2010	Asian Games	Guangzhou, China	1st	4 × 400 m relay	3:02.30 (NR)
2011	Asian Championships	Kobe, Japan	2nd	4 × 400 m relay	3:08.03
2011	World Championships	Daegu, South Korea	16th (h)	4 × 400 m relay	3:05.65
2011	Pan Arab Games	Doha, Qatar	1st	4 × 400 m relay	3:07.22
