= Tamás Margl =

Hungarian long jumper and bobsledder

Personal information
- Born: 18 June 1976 (age 50) Budapest, Hungary

Sport
- Sport: Track and field Bobsleigh

Tamás Margl (born 18 June 1976) is a retired Hungarian sportsperson who competed in long jump and later bobsleigh. He is one of the few athletes who have competed at both Summer and Winter Olympic Games.

He was born in Budapest, and represented the sports club Tatabányai SC. He was the Hungarian champion in long jump in 2001 and 2004, and indoor champion in 2000 and 2001. His personal best was 8.20 metres, achieved in June 2004 in Tatabánya. He competed at the 2004 Olympic Games without reaching the final.

Margl later competed in the four-man bobsleigh at the 2006 Winter Olympics.

He stands 1.90 m (6 ft 3 in) tall, and during his career he weighed 84 kilograms (185 lb).
