= Sompote Suwannarangsri =

Thai sprinter (born 1985)

Medal record

Men's athletics

Representing Thailand

Asian Championships
Gold medal – first place	2007 Amman	4×100 m

Sompote Suwannarangsri (born June 1, 1985 in Lopburi) is a retired sprint athlete who competed internationally for Thailand.

On the global level Suwannarangsri represented Thailand at the 2008 Summer Olympics, competing at the 4 × 100 metres relay together with Siriroj Darasuriyong, Apinan Sukaphai and Sittichai Suwonprateep. In their qualification heat they placed fifth in a time of 39.40 seconds and they were eliminated. He also competed at the 2011 World Championships without reaching the relay final. Individually he competed at the 2004 World Junior Championships (100 m) without reaching the final. The Thai relay team won gold medals in relay at the 2007 Summer Universiade; at the 2011 Universiade relay final they were disqualified, and he competed at the 2005 Summer Universiade (200 m) without reaching the final.

On the continental level the Thai relay team won the gold medals at the 2007 Asian Championships, placed fourth at the 2009 Asian Championships and fifth at the 2011 Asian Championships. He was also a heat runner at the 2006 Asian Games relay.

Individually he finished fifth at the 2006 Asian Indoor Championships (60 m), was disqualified in the final at the 2007 Asian Indoor Games (60 m) and competed at the 2005 Asian Championships (100 m) and the 2006 Asian Games (100 m) without reaching the final.

Regionally, at the 2005 Southeast Asian Games he won a gold medal in relay, the silver medal in 100 metres and bronze in the 200 metres. He won another relay gold at the 2007 and 2009 Southeast Asian Games. At the 2011 Southeast Asian Games he won the 200 metres bronze and finished fourth in the relay.

His personal best times were 6.69 seconds in the 60 metres, achieved at the 2007 Asian Indoor Games in Macau; 10.49 seconds in the 100 metres, achieved at the 2006 Asian Games in Doha; and 21.13 seconds in the 200 metres, achieved in April 2008 in Bangkok.
