= Yahya Al-Ghahes =

Saudi Arabian sprinter (born 1986)

Personal information
- Nationality: Saudi Arabian
- Born: 19 February 1986 (age 40)
- Height: 170 cm (5 ft 7 in)
- Weight: 68 kg (150 lb)

Sport
- Sport: Running

Achievements and titles
- Personal bests: 100m: 10.28; 200m: 21.51
Medal record
Representing Saudi Arabia
Men's athletics
World Youth Championships
Gold medal – first place	2003 Sherbrooke	100 m
Asian Championships
Gold medal – first place	2005 Incheon	100 m
Bronze medal – third place	2005 Incheon	4×100 m

Yahya Al-Ghahes (Arabic: يحيى قاحص; born 19 February 1986) is a Saudi Arabian sprinter who specializes in the 100 metres.

He won the 2003 World Youth Championships, finished fifth at the 2004 World Junior Championships and won the 2005 Asian Championships.

His personal best times are 6.56 seconds in the 60 metres, achieved in October 2007 in Macau; 10.28 seconds in the 100 metres, achieved in September 2005 in Radès; and 21.51 seconds in the 200 metres, achieved in February 2003 in Qatif.
