= Vitaliy Medvedev (sprinter) =

Kazakhstani sprinter (born 1977)

Vitaly Medvedev
Personal information
- Born: 6 January 1977 (age 49) Kaskelen, Alma-Ata Region, Kazakh SSR, Soviet Union
- Height: 1.73 m (5 ft 8 in)
- Weight: 64 kg (141 lb)

Sport
- Sport: Sprint running

Vitaly Medvedev (Russian: Виталий Медведев; born 6 January 1977) is a retired sprinter from Kazakhstan. He competed at the 1996 and 2000 Olympics in the 100 m, but failed to reach the finals. His personal best is 10.13 s (1999). In 2004 he graduated from the University of Texas at El Paso with a degree in philosophy.
