= Wachara Sondee =

Thai sprinter (born 1983)

Medal record

Men's athletics

Representing Thailand

Asian Games
| Gold medal – first place | 2006 Doha | 4×100 m |
| Bronze medal – third place | 2006 Doha | 100 m |
| Bronze medal – third place | 2010 Guangzhou | 4×100 m |

Asian Championships
| Gold medal – first place | 2007 Amman | 4×100 m |
| Silver medal – second place | 2005 Incheon | 4×100 m |

Asian Indoor Games
| Silver medal – second place | 2005 Bangkok | 60 m |
| Bronze medal – third place | 2007 Macau | 60 m |
| Bronze medal – third place | 2009 Hanoi | 60 m |

Asian Indoor Championships
| Silver medal – second place | 2006 Pattaya | 60 m |

Southeast Asian Games
| Gold medal – first place | 2005 Manila | 100m |
| Gold medal – first place | 2005 Manila | 4x100 m |
| Gold medal – first place | 2007 Nakhon Ratchasima | 4x100 m |
| Gold medal – first place | 2009 Vientiane | 4x100 m |
| Silver medal – second place | 2007 Nakhon Ratchasima | 100 m |
| Silver medal – second place | 2009 Vientiane | 100 m |
| Bronze medal – third place | 2011 Hanoi | 100 m |

Universiade
| Gold medal – first place | 2007 Bangkok | 4×100 m |

Wachara Sondee (born 9 April 1983) is a Thai track and field athlete who competes in sprinting events. He primarily competes in the 100 metres and 60 metres and is the Thai national record holder for the shorter distance with his best of 6.65 seconds.

He has won medals indoors at three straight editions of the Asian Indoor Games and was the silver medallist over 60 m at the 2006 Asian Indoor Athletics Championships. His highest level achievements came at the 2006 Asian Games, where he was a 100 m medallist and won the 4×100 m relay title with Thailand. His winning performance in the relay at the 2007 Summer Universiade in Bangkok was his country's first ever medal in athletics at the games.

Sondee has performed on the global stage at the 2009 World Championships in Athletics and the 2006 IAAF World Indoor Championships. Much of his success has come at the regional level where he has won three consecutive relay golds at the Southeast Asian Games to complement individual gold and silver medals in the 100 m.

== Career ==
Sondee made his first international appearances in 2005, starting with a sixth place finish in the 100 metres final of the 2005 Summer Universiade and a run at the 2005 Asian Athletics Championships. That November, he ran in the 60 metres final of the inaugural Asian Indoor Games in Bangkok, but was beaten to the gold by Yik Chun Tang and had to settle for second place. He won the gold medal in a Thai 1–2 of the 100 m at the 2005 Southeast Asian Games with Sompote Suwannarangsri, and the pair teamed up to claim the 4×100 metres relay title.

Sondee ran a personal best and Thai national record of 6.65 seconds at the 2006 Asian Indoor Athletics Championships, but was edged into second place as China's Gong Wei took the 60 m gold. This performance earned him selection for the 2006 IAAF World Indoor Championships in Moscow the following month, but he was eliminated in the first round. The 2006 Asian Games that year saw him run a 100 m personal best of 10.39 sec in the final to secure the bronze medal. Sondee and a team including Sittichai Suwonprateep saw off Japan to win the 4×100 m relay gold medals.

Bangkok hosted the 2007 Summer Universiade and although Sondee was knocked out of the 100 m at the semi-final stage, his Thai team including Pirom Autas, Suwannarangsri and Suwonprateep won Thailand's first ever medal in the history of the competition by taking the 4×100 m relay gold. In October he equalled his 60 m best at the 2007 Asian Indoor Games, taking the bronze. He attempted to defend his 100 m title at the 2007 Southeast Asian Games (also hosted on home territory in Nakhon Ratchasima), but his personal best run of 10.33 sec was only enough for second behind Indonesia's Suryo Agung Wibowo. The relay team was unrivalled, however, as Sondee led off the team to a Games record mark of 38.95 seconds.

He missed much of the 2008 season but returned to international competition at the 2009 Summer Universiade, where he was fourth with the Thai men's relay team. He was chosen for the relay team at the 2009 World Championships in Athletics, but they did not make it into the final round. At the 2009 Asian Indoor Games he repeated his 2007 performance by taking the 60 m bronze medal. A 10.30-second run at the 2009 SEA Games brought him a second consecutive silver medal and he also won a gold at the competition for the 4×100 m relay. Sondee reached the 100 m semi-finals at the 2010 Asian Games, but the Thai men failed to defend their relay title, leaving the competition with the bronze medals on this occasion.
