= Shinji Takahira =

Japanese sprinter

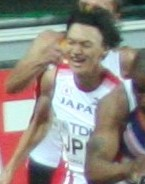
- Takahira in 2007

Personal information
- Born: 18 July 1984 (age 41) Asahikawa, Japan
- Height: 1.80 m (5 ft 11 in)
- Weight: 60 kg (132 lb)

Sport
- Country: Japan
- Sport: Athletics
- Event: 200 metres
Medal record
Men's athletics
Representing Japan
Olympic Games
Silver medal – second place	2008 Beijing	4 × 100 m
Asian Championships
Gold medal – first place	2009 Guangzhou	4 × 100 m
Silver medal – second place	2009 Guangzhou	200 m

Shinji Takahira (高平 慎士, Takahira Shinji; born 18 July 1984 in Asahikawa) is a Japanese sprinter who specialises in the 100 and 200 metres.

Takahira competed in the 200 m at the 2004 Athens Olympics and the 2005 World Championships but failed to progress beyond the heats. He took the silver medal at the 2005 Summer Universiade. He represented Japan in his home country at the 2007 Osaka World Championships and reached the quarter-finals of the 200 m event.

Takahira represented Japan at the 2008 Summer Olympics in Beijing. He competed at the 4 × 100 metres relay together with Naoki Tsukahara, Shingo Suetsugu and Nobuharu Asahara. In their qualification heat they placed second in behind Trinidad and Tobago, but in front of the Netherlands and Brazil. Their time of 38.52 was the third fastest out of sixteen participating nations in the first round and they qualified for the final. There they sprinted to a time of 38.15 seconds, the third time after the Jamaican and Trinidad teams, winning the bronze medal. However, in January 2017, Jamaica's medal was revoked due to one of their athletes proven to have been doping; this meant that Japan now moved up to a silver medal. He also took part in the 200 metres individual. In his first round heat he placed fourth in a time of 20.58 seconds, outside the direct qualifiers. His time was however among the best losing times, securing his second round spot. In the second round he came to a time of 20.63 seconds and was eliminated as he only placed seventh in the heat.

Takahira made a good start to the 2009 season, finishing second and recording a new 200 m best of 20.31 s at the 2009 Osaka Grand Prix. He felt spurred on by running against American athlete Rodney Martin and stated that he hoped to make the semis or final of the forthcoming Berlin World Championships. He won the 200 m at the Japanese Championships, breaking his personal best with a run of 20.22 seconds. This was the third-fastest time ever run in Japan, and Takahira said "I was secretly hoping for Suetsugu’s (national) record".

== Achievements ==
=== Competition record ===
Year	Competition	Venue	Position	Event	Notes
Representing Japan
2002	World Junior Championships	Kingston, Jamaica	7th	4 × 100 m relay	40.05
2003	Universiade	Daegu, South Korea	1st	4 × 100 m relay	39.45
2003	Universiade	Daegu, South Korea	4th	4 × 400 m relay	3:05.97
2004	Olympic Games	Athens, Greece	40th (h)	200 m	21.05
2004	Olympic Games	Athens, Greece	4th	4 × 100 m relay	38.49
2005	World Championships	Helsinki, Finland	33rd (h)	200 m	21.03
2005	World Championships	Helsinki, Finland	8th	4 × 100 m relay	38.77
2005	Universiade	İzmir, Turkey	2nd	200 m	20.93
2005	Universiade	İzmir, Turkey	2nd	4 × 100 m relay	39.29
2005	Universiade	İzmir, Turkey	2nd (h)	4 × 400 m relay	3:05.02
2005	East Asian Games	Macau	1st	200 m	20.88
2005	East Asian Games	Macau	1st	4 × 100 m relay	39.61
2006	World Cup	Athens, Greece	3rd	4 × 100 m relay	38.51
2006	Asian Games	Doha, Qatar	3rd	200 m	20.81
2006	Asian Games	Doha, Qatar	2nd	4 × 100 m relay	39.21
2007	World Championships	Osaka, Japan	21st (qf)	200 m	20.77
2007	World Championships	Osaka, Japan	5th	4 × 100 m relay	38.03 (AR)
2008	Olympic Games	Beijing, China	21st (qf)	200 m	20.63
2008	Olympic Games	Beijing, China	2nd	4 × 100 m relay	38.15
2009	World Championships	Berlin, Germany	17th (qf)	200 m	20.69
2009	World Championships	Berlin, Germany	4th	4 × 100 m relay	38.30
2009	Asian Championships	Guangzhou, China	2nd	100 m	10.32
2009	Asian Championships	Guangzhou, China	1st	4 × 100 m relay	39.01
2010	Asian Games	Guangzhou, China	10th (h)	4 × 100 m relay	47.14
2011	Asian Championships	Kobe, Japan	1st	4 × 100 m relay	39.18
2011	World Championships	Daegu, South Korea	16th (sf)	200 m	20.90
2011	World Championships	Daegu, South Korea	9th (h)	4 × 100 m relay	38.66
2012	Olympic Games	London, United Kingdom	19th (sf)	200 m	20.77
2012	Olympic Games	London, United Kingdom	5th	4 × 100 m relay	38.35
2014	IAAF World Relays	Nassau, Bahamas	9th (h)	4 × 200 m relay	1:23.87
2014	Asian Games	Incheon, South Korea	2nd	4 × 100 m relay	38.49
2014	Asian Games	Incheon, South Korea	2nd (h)	4 × 400 m relay	3:05.53

=== Personal bests ===
Event	Time	Location	Date
100 metres	10.20 sec	Hiroshima, Japan	29 April 2009
200 metres	20.22 sec	Hiroshima, Japan	26 June 2009
