= Ali Shareef =

Maldivian sprinter

Ali Shareef (born July 1, 1979) is a track and field sprint athlete who competes internationally for the Maldives.

Shareef represented the Maldives at the 2008 Summer Olympics in Beijing. He competed at the 100 metres sprint and placed 7th in his heat without advancing to the second round. He ran the distance in a time of 11.11 seconds.

He competed at the 100 metres sprint and first round placed 3rd in south Asian games 2010 dhaka his heat time of 11.03 He ran the final round 100 meter distance in a time of 11.08 seconds.1

He is the first man in Maldives which held the national record in 100 and 200 meters in three consecutive years 2006 to 2008 in Maldivian National championship.

Achievements (National Level) 2004 : Association Championship (1st in 100m/ 2nd in 200m/ 1st in 4X100m Relay/ 1st in 4X400 Relay) 2005 : National Tournament (1st in Long Jump/ 2nd in 100m/ 2nd in 200m/ 1st in 4X100m Relay/ 1st in 4X400 Relay) 2006 : National Tournament (1st in 100m/ 1st in 200m/ 1st in 4X100m Relay/ 1st in 4X400 Relay) 2007 : National Tournament (1st in 100m/ 1st in 200m/ 1st in 4X100m Relay/ 1st in 4X400 Relay) 2008 : National Tournament (1st in 100m/ 1st in 200m/ 1st in 4X100m Relay/ 1st in 4X400 Relay) 2009 : National Tournament (1st in 100m/ 2nd in 200m/ 1st in 4X100m Relay/ 1st in 4X400 Relay) 2012 : National Tournament (3rd in 100m/ 1st in 4X100m Relay )

Participation (International Level) 2005 : IAAF World Championship/ Helsinki. 2005 : 1st Asian Indoor Games/ Bangkok. 2005 : 16th Asian Athletics championship/ Incheon. 2006 : Asian Games/ Dhoha. 2006 : IAAF Indoor World Championship/ Moscow. 2006 : South Asian Games/ Colombo. 2008 : Asian Athletics Championship/ kochi. 2008 : 2nd Asian Indoor Championship/ Dhoha. 2008 : Olympic Games/ Beijing. 2010 : South Asian Games/Dhaka.
