= Martin Vihmann =

Estonian athletics competitor (born 1981)

Martin Vihmann (born 23 August 1981) is an Estonian athletics competitor.

In 2009, he graduated from Tallinn University of Technology.

He began athletics training in 1997, coached by Ando and Katrin Palginõmm. From 1999 to 2005, his coach was Valter Espe. In 2003, he won a bronze medal at the 2003 Summer Universiade in 4 × 100 metres relay. He is multiple-times Estonian champion in different running disciplines. From 2001 to 2008, he was a member of Estonian national athletics team.

Besides athletics, he has also been successful in rally driving. From 2016 to 2019, he won 4 medals at Estonian championships.

Personal best:

- 100 m 10,62 (2002)
- 200 m 21,05 (2005)
- 400 m 46,99 (2004)
