= Yang Yaozu =

Chinese sprinter (born 1981)

Personal information
- Born: January 9, 1981 (age 45) Shanghai, China

Sport
- Sport: Track and field
Medal record
Representing China
Asian Games
| Silver medal – second place | 2006 Doha | 200 m |
| Bronze medal – third place | 2002 Busan | 200 m |
| Bronze medal – third place | 2006 Doha | 4x100 m relay |
Asian Championships
| Gold medal – first place | 2003 Manila | 4×100 m relay |
| Bronze medal – third place | 2003 Manila | 200 m |
| Bronze medal – third place | 2005 Incheon | 200 m |

Yang Yaozu (simplified Chinese: 杨耀祖; traditional Chinese: 楊耀祖; pinyin: Yáng Yàozǔ; born January 9, 1981) is a Chinese sprinter. His personal best of 20.54 seconds in the 200 metres makes him the joint national record holder in the event. Formerly the number one Chinese sprinter, injuries have affected his performances since the 2006 season.

== Achievements ==
| Year | Competition | Venue | Position | Event | Notes |
Representing China
| 2000 | World Junior Championships | Santiago, Chile | 10th (sf) | 200m | 20.96 (wind: -0.5 m/s) |
| 2002 | Asian Games | Busan, South Korea | 3rd | 200 m | 20.58 |
| 2003 | Asian Championships | Manila, Philippines | 3rd | 200 m | 20.82 |
| 2005 | Asian Championships | Incheon, South Korea | 3rd | 200 m | 20.85 |
| 2006 | World Cup | Athens, Greece | 6th | 100 m | 10.21 PB |
| 2006 | Asian Games | Doha, Qatar | 2nd | 200 m | 20.71 |
| 2006 | Asian Games | Doha, Qatar | 3rd | 4 × 100 m relay | 39.62 |

== Personal bests ==
- 100 metres - 10.21 s (2006)
- 200 metres - 20.54 s (2006)
