= Tang Yik Chun =

Hong Kong sprinter

Personal information
- Born: June 23, 1986 (age 40) Hong Kong
- Height: 1.77 m (5 ft 9 1/2 in)
- Weight: 67 kg (148 lb)

Sport
- Country: Hong Kong
- Sport: Athletics
- Event: 4 × 100m relay
Medal record
Men's Athletics
Representing Hong Kong
Asian Athletics Championships
Gold medal – first place	2013 Puna	4 × 100 m relay
Silver medal – second place	2011 Kobe	4 × 100 m relay
East Asian Games
Silver medal – second place	2013 Tianjin	4 × 100 m relay
Asian Games
Bronze medal – third place	2014 Incheon	4 × 100 m relay

Tang Yik Chun (Chinese: 鄧亦峻; Jyutping: dang^{6} yik^{6} zeon^{3}; born 23 June 1986) is a Hong Kong sprinter. He competed in the 4 × 100 m relay event at the 2012 Summer Olympics.
