= 2023 Asian Athletics Championships – Men's 100 metres =

Men's 100 metres at the 2023 Asian Athletics Championships
- Venue: National Stadium
- Location: Bangkok, Thailand
- Dates: 13 July (heats); 14 July (semi-finals & final)
- Competitors: 42 from 27 nations
- Winning time: 10.02

Medalists
gold medal	Hiroki Yanagita	Japan
silver medal	Abdullah Abkar Mohammed	Saudi Arabia
bronze medal	Hassan Taftian	Iran

The men's 100 metres event at the 2023 Asian Athletics Championships was held on 13 and 14 July.

== Records ==
Records before the 2023 Asian Athletics Championships
Record	Athlete (nation)	Time (s)	Location	Date
World record	Usain Bolt (JAM)	9.58	Berlin, Germany	16 August 2009
Asian record	Su Bingtian (CHN)	9.83	Tokyo, Japan	1 August 2021
Championship record	Femi Ogunode (QAT)	9.91	Wuhan, China	4 June 2015
World leading	Zharnel Hughes (GBR)	9.83	New York City, United States	24 June 2023
Asian leading	Yoshihide Kiryu (JPN)	10.03	Osaka, Japan	6 May 2023

== Results ==
=== Heats ===
Held on 13 July. First 3 in each heat (Q) and the next 6 fastest (q) qualified for the semi-finals.

==== Heat 1 ====
Rank	Athlete	Nation	Time	Notes
1	Ryuichiro Sakai	Japan	10.18	Q
2	Imran Rahman	Bangladesh	10.25	Q, NR
3	Ngần Ngọc Nghĩa	Vietnam	10.41	Q
4	Khairul Hafiz Jantan	Malaysia	10.46	q
5	Park Won-jin	South Korea	10.48	q
6	Alisher Sadulayev	Turkmenistan	10.81	
7	Bilal Thiyab	Jordan	10.87	
			Wind: 0.0 m/s	

==== Heat 2 ====
Rank	Athlete	Nation	Time	Notes
1	Muhd Azeem Fahmi	Malaysia	10.24	Q
2	Lee Hong Kit	Hong Kong	10.46	Q
3	Ali Anwar Al-Balushi	Oman	10.61	Q
4	Vitaliy Zems	Kazakhstan	10.62	
5	Mark Lee	Singapore	10.63	
6	Sorsy Phompakdy	Laos	10.78	NR
7	Ahmed Najudhaan Abdulla	Maldives	11.20	
			Wind: +0.5 m/s	

==== Heat 3 ====
Rank	Athlete	Nation	Time	Notes
1	Abdullah Abkar Mohammed	Saudi Arabia	10.18	Q
2	Femi Ogunode	Qatar	10.19	Q
3	Shajar Abbas	Pakistan	10.37	Q, NR
4	Noureddine Hadid	Lebanon	10.48	q
5	Natawat Imaudom	Thailand	10.57	q
6	Hadi Sudirman	Indonesia	10.60	
7	Xaidavahn Vongsavanh	Laos	10.91	
			Wind: 0.0 m/s	

==== Heat 4 ====
Rank	Athlete	Nation	Time	Notes
1	Hiroki Yanagita	Japan	10.10	Q, =PB
2	Marc Brian Louis	Singapore	10.43	Q
3	Chen Guanfeng	China	10.47	Q
4	Soraoat Dabbang	Thailand	10.60	q
5	Aimat Tulebayev	Kazakhstan	10.77	
6	Chanyourong Noeb	Cambodia	11.07	
7	Aayush Kunwar	Nepal	11.20	
			Wind: -0.5 m/s	

==== Heat 5 ====
Rank	Athlete	Nation	Time	Notes
1	Hassan Taftian	Iran	10.40	Q
2	Lin Yu-hsien	Chinese Taipei	10.44	Q
3	Barakat Al-Harthi	Oman	10.46	Q
4	Chan Kin Wa	Macau	10.83	
5	Favoris Muzrapov	Tajikistan	10.86	
—	Wais Ahmad Atayee	Afghanistan	DQ	
—	Nasser Mahmoud Mohammed	Saudi Arabia	DNS	
			Wind: +0.2 m/s	

==== Heat 6 ====
Rank	Athlete	Nation	Time	Notes
1	Yang Chun-han	Chinese Taipei	10.25	Q
2	Chen Jiapeng	China	10.36	Q
3	Shak Kam Ching	Hong Kong	10.46	Q
4	Lee Shim-on	South Korea	10.50	q
5	Ildar Akhmadiyev	Tajikistan	10.67	
6	Shivaraj Parki	Nepal	11.22	
7	Safar Ali Ahmadi	Afghanistan	11.89	
			Wind: +0.4 m/s	

=== Semi-finals ===
Held on 14 July. First 2 in each heat (Q) and the next 2 fastest (q) qualified for the final.

==== Heat 1 ====
Rank	Athlete	Nation	Time	Notes
1	Ryuichiro Sakai	Japan	10.23	Q
2	Muhd Azeem Fahmi	Malaysia	10.35	Q
3	Chen Jiapeng	China	10.38	q
4	Lin Yu-hsien	Chinese Taipei	10.46	
5	Shak Kam Ching	Hong Kong	10.57	
6	Barakat Al-Harthi	Oman	10.60	
—	Park Won-jin	South Korea	DNS	
—	Natawat Imaudom	Thailand	DNS	
			Wind: -0.6 m/s	

==== Heat 2 ====
Rank	Athlete	Nation	Time	Notes
1	Hiroki Yanagita	Japan	10.14	Q
2	Hassan Taftian	Iran	10.19	Q
3	Femi Ogunode	Qatar	10.24	q
4	Shajar Abbas	Pakistan	10.45	
5	Soraoat Dabbang	Thailand	10.47	
6	Khairul Hafiz Jantan	Malaysia	10.50	
7	Lee Hong Kit	Hong Kong	10.53	
—	Ali Anwar Al-Balushi	Oman	DNF	
			Wind: 0.0 m/s	

==== Heat 3 ====
Rank	Athlete	Nation	Time	Notes
1	Abdullah Abkar Mohammed	Saudi Arabia	10.24	Q
2	Yang Chun-han	Chinese Taipei	10.33	Q
3	Chen Guanfeng	China	10.38	
4	Marc Brian Louis	Singapore	10.39	=PB
5	Imran Rahman	Bangladesh	10.40	
6	Noureddine Hadid	Lebanon	10.48	
7	Ngần Ngọc Nghĩa	Vietnam	10.53	
8	Lee Shim-on	South Korea	10.59	
			Wind: +0.3 m/s	

=== Final ===
Held on 14 July.

Rank	Lane	Athlete	Nation	Time	Notes
1st place, gold medalist(s)	5	Hiroki Yanagita	Japan	10.02	PB
2nd place, silver medalist(s)	6	Abdullah Abkar Mohammed	Saudi Arabia	10.19	
3rd place, bronze medalist(s)	4	Hassan Taftian	Iran	10.23	
4	2	Femi Ogunode	Qatar	10.25	
5	7	Muhd Azeem Fahmi	Malaysia	10.25	
6	3	Ryuichiro Sakai	Japan	10.26	
7	1	Chen Jiapeng	China	10.30	
8	8	Yang Chun-han	Chinese Taipei	10.31	
				Wind: 0.0 m/s	
