= Athletics at the 2022 Asian Games – Men's 4 × 100 metres relay =

Men's 4 × 100 metres relay at the 2022 Asian Games
- Venue: Hangzhou Olympic Expo Main Stadium
- Date: 2–3 October 2023
- Competitors: 55 from 14 nations

Medalists
gold medal	China; Chen Guanfeng, Xie Zhenye, Yan Haibin, Chen Jiapeng
silver medal	Japan; Yoshihide Kiryu, Yuki Koike, Koki Ueyama, Shoto Uno
bronze medal	South Korea; Lee Jeong-tae, Kim Kuk-young, Lee Jae-seong, Ko Seung-hwan, Park Won-jin

The men's 4 × 100 metres relay competition at the 2022 Asian Games took place on 2 and 3 October 2023 at the HOC Stadium, Hangzhou.

== Schedule ==
All times are China Standard Time (UTC+08:00)

Date	Time	Event
Monday, 2 October 2023	09:20	Round 1
Tuesday, 3 October 2023	21:25	Final

== Records ==
Prior to this competition, the existing world, Asian and Games records were as follows.

World Record	Jamaica	36.84	London, United Kingdom	11 August 2012
Asian Record	Japan	37.43	Doha, Qatar	5 October 2019
Games Record	China	37.99	Incheon, South Korea	2 October 2014

== Results ==
Legend

- DNS — Did not start
- DSQ — Disqualified

=== Round 1 ===
- Qualification: First 3 in each heat (Q) and the next 2 fastest (q) advance to the final.

==== Heat 1 ====
Rank	Team	Time	Notes
1	China (CHN); Chen Guanfeng; Xie Zhenye; Yan Haibin; Chen Jiapeng	38.62	Q
2	South Korea (KOR); Lee Jeong-tae; Kim Kuk-young; Lee Jae-seong; Park Won-jin	38.75	Q
3	Malaysia (MAS); Khairul Hafiz Jantan; Arsyad Saat; Jonathan Nyepa; Muhd Azeem Fahmi	39.40	Q
4	Thailand (THA); Natawat Iamudom; Soraoat Dapbang; Chayut Khongprasit; Thawatchai Himaiad	39.57	q
5	Maldives (MDV); Ahmed Najudhaan Abdulla; Ibrahim Nahil Nizar; Mohamed Minhal Shamin; Hassan Saaid	42.19	
—	Hong Kong (HKG); Ho Wai Lun; Lee Hong Kit; Felix Diu; Ng Ka Fung	DSQ	
—	Oman (OMA); Rashid Al-Aasmi; Barakat Al-Harthi; Mohamed Obaid Al-Saadi; Ali Anwar Al-Balushi	DSQ	

==== Heat 2 ====
Rank	Team	Time	Notes
1	Japan (JPN); Yoshihide Kiryu; Yuki Koike; Koki Ueyama; Shoto Uno	38.99	Q
2	Indonesia (INA); Wahyu Setiawan; Lalu Muhammad Zohri; Bayu Kertanegara; Adith Rico Pradana	39.56	Q
3	Singapore (SGP); Mark Lee; Joshua Chua; Calvin Quek; Marc Brian Louis	39.70	Q
4	Chinese Taipei (TPE); Wei Tai-sheng; Chen Wen-pu; Yang Chun-han; Wang Wei-hsu	39.81	q
5	Saudi Arabia (KSA); Sultan Al-Khalidi; Abdulaziz Atafi; Hamoud Olwani; Mahmoud Hafiz	40.34	
6	Macau (MAC); Lou Weng Fu; Bu Cheng Hou; Vong Ka In; Chan Kin Wa	42.36	
—	Mongolia (MGL) — — — —	DNS	

=== Final ===
Rank	Team	Time	Notes
1st place, gold medalist(s)	China (CHN); Chen Guanfeng; Xie Zhenye; Yan Haibin; Chen Jiapeng	38.29	
2nd place, silver medalist(s)	Japan (JPN); Yoshihide Kiryu; Yuki Koike; Koki Ueyama; Shoto Uno	38.44	
3rd place, bronze medalist(s)	South Korea (KOR); Lee Jeong-tae; Kim Kuk-young; Lee Jae-seong; Ko Seung-hwan	38.74	
4	Thailand (THA); Natawat Iamudom; Soraoat Dapbang; Chayut Khongprasit; Puripol Boonson	38.81	
5	Indonesia (INA); Wahyu Setiawan; Lalu Muhammad Zohri; Bayu Kertanegara; Adith Rico Pradana	39.25	
6	Chinese Taipei (TPE); Wei Tai-sheng; Chen Wen-pu; Yang Chun-han; Lin Yu-tang	39.28	
7	Singapore (SGP); Mark Lee; Joshua Chua; Calvin Quek; Marc Brian Louis	39.38	
—	Malaysia (MAS); Khairul Hafiz Jantan; Arsyad Saat; Jonathan Nyepa; Muhd Azeem Fahmi	DSQ	
