= 2023 Asian Athletics Championships – Men's 4 × 100 metres relay =

Men's 4 × 100 metres relay at the 2023 Asian Athletics Championships
- Venue: National Stadium
- Location: Bangkok, Thailand
- Dates: 12 July (heats); 13 July (final)
- Nations: 12
- Winning time: 38.55 CR, NR

Medalists
gold medal	Natawat Imaudom; Soraoat Dabbang; Chayut Khongprasit; Puripol Boonson	Thailand
silver medal	Wu Zhiqiang; Xie Zhenye; Chen Jiapeng; Chen Guanfeng	China
bronze medal	Lee Shim-on; Ko Seung-hwan; Shin Min-kyu; Park Won-jin	South Korea

The men's 4 × 100 metres relay event at the 2023 Asian Athletics Championships was held on 12 and 13 July.

== Results ==
=== Heats ===
Qualification rule: First 3 in each heat (Q) and the next 2 fastest (q) qualified for the final.

Rank	Heat	Nation	Athletes	Time	Notes
1	1	Thailand	Natawat Imaudom, Soraoat Dabbang, Chayut Khongprasit, Puripol Boonson	38.66	Q
2	2	China	Wu Zhiqiang, Xie Zhenye, Chen Jiapeng, Chen Guanfeng	39.12	Q
3	1	Malaysia	Khairul Hafiz Jantan, Jonathan Nyepa, Mohammad Thafiq Hisham, Muhd Azeem Fahmi	39.20	Q
4	2	South Korea	Lee Shim-on, Ko Seung-hwan, Shin Min-kyu, Park Won-jin	39.33	Q
5	2	Chinese Taipei	Wei Tai-sheng, Chen Wen-pu, Yang Chun-han, Wang Wei-hsu	39.43	Q
6	2	Oman	Mohammed Hamdan Said, Ahmed Mubarak Saleh Al-Saadi, Hussain Mohsen Al-Farisi, Som Bahadur	39.48	q
7	2	Saudi Arabia	Mohammed Dawood Abdullah, Fahad Mohamed Al-Subaie, Mahmoud Hafiz Ibrahim, Abdullah Abkar Mohammed	39.50	q
8	1	Singapore	Calvin Quek, Joshua Chua Hanwei, Mark Lee, Marc Brian Louis	39.62	Q
9	1	Hong Kong	Yat Lok Chan, Lee Hong Kit, Ho Wai Lun, Ng Ka Fung	39.66	
10	1	Indonesia	Wahyu Setiawan, Bayu Kerta Negara, Rico Adith, Hadi Sudirman	39.90	
11	1	Laos	Siphasouk Botvilaithong, Sorsy Phompakdy, Khanmalaiphone Bounyaveun, Xaidavahn Vongsavanh	41.24	
12	2	Maldives	Ismail Rasheed, Hussain Fazeel, Wan Muhammad Nazri, Ibrahim Nahil Nizar	42.97	

=== Final ===
Rank	Lane	Team	Name	Time	Notes
1st place, gold medalist(s)	5	Thailand	Natawat Imaudom, Soraoat Dabbang, Chayut Khongprasit, Puripol Boonson	38.55	CR, NR
2nd place, silver medalist(s)	3	China	Wu Zhiqiang, Xie Zhenye, Chen Jiapeng, Chen Guanfeng	38.87	
3rd place, bronze medalist(s)	6	South Korea	Lee Shim-on, Ko Seung-hwan, Shin Min-kyu, Park Won-jin	38.99	
4	2	Saudi Arabia	Mohammed Dawood Abdullah, Fahad Mohamed Al-Subaie, Mahmoud Hafiz Ibrahim, Abdullah Abkar Mohammed	39.12	
5	1	Oman	Rashid Al-Aasmi, Barakat Al-Harthi, Mohamed Obaid Al-Saadi, Khaled Saleh Al-Ghailani	39.17	NR
6	4	Malaysia	Khairul Hafiz Jantan, Jonathan Nyepa, Mohammad Thafiq Hisham, Muhd Azeem Fahmi	39.17	
7	8	Singapore	Calvin Quek, Joshua Chua Hanwei, Mark Lee, Marc Brian Louis	39.32	
8	7	Chinese Taipei	Wei Tai-sheng, Chen Wen-pu, Yang Chun-han, Wang Wei-hsu	48.96	
