= 2023 Asian Athletics Championships – Men's 200 metres =

Men's 200 metres at the 2023 Asian Athletics Championships
- Venue: National Stadium
- Location: Bangkok, Thailand
- Dates: 15 July (heats & semi-finals); 16 July (final)
- Competitors: 38 from 26 nations
- Winning time: 20.23 CR

Medalists
gold medal	Towa Uzawa	Japan
silver medal	Yang Chun-han	Chinese Taipei
bronze medal	Koki Ueyama	Japan

The men's 200 metres event at the 2023 Asian Athletics Championships was held on 15 and 16 July.

== Records ==
Records before the 2023 Asian Athletics Championships
Record	Athlete (nation)	Time (s)	Location	Date
World record	Usain Bolt (JAM)	19.19	Berlin, Germany	20 August 2009
Asian record	Xie Zhenye (CHN)	19.88	London, United Kingdom	21 July 2019
Championship record	Femi Ogunode (QAT)	20.28	Wuhan, China	6 June 2015
World leading	Noah Lyles (USA)	19.67	Kingston, Jamaica	3 June 2023
Asian leading	Towa Uzawa (JPN)	20.32	Osaka, Japan	2 June 2023

== Results ==
=== Heats ===
Held on 15 July. First 4 in each heat (Q) and the next 4 fastest (q) qualified for the semi-finals.

==== Heat 1 ====
Rank	Athlete	Nation	Time	Notes
1	Towa Uzawa	Japan	20.73	Q
2	Rashid Al-Aasmi	Oman	21.16	Q
3	Milad Naseh Jahani	Iran	21.17	Q
4	Ngần Ngọc Nghĩa	Vietnam	21.20	Q
5	Ho Wai Lun	Hong Kong	21.43	q, PB
6	Bilal Thiyab	Jordan	21.73	q, PB
7	Aimat Tulebayev	Kazakhstan	21.82	q
			Wind: +0.7 m/s	

==== Heat 2 ====
Rank	Athlete	Nation	Time	Notes
1	Koki Ueyama	Japan	20.73	Q
2	Abdulaziz Abdou Atafi	Saudi Arabia	21.06	Q
3	Noureddine Hadid	Lebanon	21.18	Q
4	Mohammad Jahir Rayhan	Bangladesh	21.67	Q
5	Chan Kin Wa	Macau	21.85	
6	Ibrahim Nahil Nizar	Maldives	22.59	PB
7	Penjor Tshering	Bhutan	22.83	NR
			Wind: +0.5 m/s	

==== Heat 3 ====
Rank	Athlete	Nation	Time	Notes
1	Xie Zhenye	China	20.57	Q
2	Yang Chun-han	Chinese Taipei	20.87	Q
3	Ko Seung-hwan	South Korea	20.91	Q
4	Mark Lee	Singapore	21.48	Q
5	Mueed Abdul	Pakistan	21.86	
6	Md Rakibul Hasan	Bangladesh	22.41	
7	Shivaraj Parki	Nepal	22.64	PB
8	Wais Ahmad Atayee	Afghanistan	23.68	PB
			Wind: 0.0 m/s	

==== Heat 4 ====
Rank	Athlete	Nation	Time	Notes
1	Shin Min-kyu	South Korea	21.17	Q
2	Fahad Mohamed Al-Subaie	Saudi Arabia	21.23	Q
3	Mohamed Obaid Al-Saadi	Oman	21.30	Q
4	Jonathan Nyepa	Malaysia	21.79	Q
5	Favoris Muzrapov	Tajikistan	22.30	
6	Alisher Sadulayev	Turkmenistan	22.41	
7	Safar Ali Ahmadi	Afghanistan	24.90	PB
—	Soraoat Dapbang	Thailand	DNS	
			Wind: -1.1 m/s	

==== Heat 5 ====
Rank	Athlete	Nation	Time	Notes
1	Femi Ogunode	Qatar	20.93	Q
2	Shajar Abbas	Pakistan	21.06	Q
3	Chen Wen-pu	Chinese Taipei	21.12	Q
4	Chayut Khongprasit	Thailand	21.53	Q
5	Vitaliy Zems	Kazakhstan	21.76	q
6	Sorsy Phompakdy	Laos	21.90	NR
7	Aayush Kunwar	Nepal	22.40	PB
—	Reuben Rainer Lee Siong En	Singapore	DNS	
			Wind: +0.2 m/s	

=== Semi-finals ===
Held on 15 July. First 2 in each heat (Q) and the next 2 fastest (q) qualified for the final.

==== Heat 1 ====
Rank	Athlete	Nation	Time	Notes
1	Xie Zhenye	China	20.71	Q
2	Ko Seung-hwan	South Korea	20.79	Q
3	Shajar Abbas	Pakistan	21.04	
4	Chen Wen-pu	Chinese Taipei	21.09	
5	Chayut Khongprasit	Thailand	21.12	
6	Milad Naseh Jahani	Iran	21.14	
7	Mohammad Jahir Rayhan	Bangladesh	21.69	
8	Aimat Tulebayev	Kazakhstan	22.14	
			Wind: 0.0 m/s	

==== Heat 2 ====
Rank	Athlete	Nation	Time	Notes
1	Femi Ogunode	Qatar	20.66	Q
2	Koki Ueyama	Japan	20.83	Q
3	Fahad Mohamed Al-Subaie	Saudi Arabia	20.99	q
4	Mohamed Obaid Al-Saadi	Oman	21.08	
5	Shin Min-kyu	South Korea	21.15	
6	Ngần Ngọc Nghĩa	Vietnam	21.20	
7	Ho Wai Lun	Hong Kong	21.82	
8	Bilal Thiyab	Jordan	21.86	
			Wind: -0.2 m/s	

==== Heat 3 ====
Rank	Athlete	Nation	Time	Notes
1	Towa Uzawa	Japan	20.56	Q
2	Yang Chun-han	Chinese Taipei	20.71	Q
3	Abdulaziz Abdou Atafi	Saudi Arabia	20.85	q
4	Noureddine Hadid	Lebanon	21.16	
5	Rashid Al-Aasmi	Oman	21.17	
6	Vitaliy Zems	Kazakhstan	21.48	
7	Mark Lee	Singapore	21.56	
8	Jonathan Nyepa	Malaysia	21.83	
			Wind: -0.4 m/s	

=== Final ===
Held on 16 July.

Rank	Lane	Athlete	Nation	Time	Notes
1st place, gold medalist(s)	4	Towa Uzawa	Japan	20.23	CR
2nd place, silver medalist(s)	6	Yang Chun-han	Chinese Taipei	20.48	
3rd place, bronze medalist(s)	8	Koki Ueyama	Japan	20.53	
4	3	Xie Zhenye	China	20.66	
5	7	Ko Seung-hwan	South Korea	20.66	
6	1	Abdulaziz Abdou Atafi	Saudi Arabia	20.74	
7	2	Fahad Mohamed Al-Subaie	Saudi Arabia	21.10	
8	5	Femi Ogunode	Qatar	29.03	
				Wind: -0.4 m/s	
