= 2025 Asian Athletics Championships – Men's 100 metres =

Men's 100 metres at the 2025 Asian Athletics Championships
- Venue: Gumi Civic Stadium
- Location: Gumi, South Korea
- Dates: 27 May (heats); 28 May (semi-finals & final)
- Competitors: 37 from 25 nations
- Winning time: 10.20 [.194]

Medalists
gold medal	Hiroki Yanagita	Japan
silver medal	Puripol Boonson	Thailand
bronze medal	Abdullah Abkar Mohammed	Saudi Arabia

The men's 100 metres event at the 2025 Asian Athletics Championships was held on 27 and 28 May.

== Records ==
Records before the 2025 Asian Athletics Championships
Record	Athlete (nation)	Time (s)	Location	Date
World record	Usain Bolt (JAM)	9.58	Berlin, Germany	16 August 2009
Asian record	Su Bingtian (CHN)	9.83	Tokyo, Japan	1 August 2021
Championship record	Femi Ogunode (QAT)	9.91	Wuhan, China	4 June 2015
World leading	Akani Simbine (RSA)	9.90	Gaborone, Botswana	12 April 2025
Asian leading	Hiroki Yanagita (JPN)	10.06	Tokyo, Japan	18 May 2025

== Schedule ==
The event schedule, in local time (UTC+9), was as follows:

Date	Time	Round
27 May	15:00	Heats
28 May	17:15	Semi-finals
28 May	20:00	Final

== Results ==
=== Heats ===
Held on 27 May. First 4 in each heat (Q) and the next 4 fastest (q) qualified for the semi-finals.

==== Heat 1 ====
Place	Lane	Athlete	Nation	Time	Notes
1	3	Ali Anwar Al-Balushi	Oman	10.34	Q
2	5	Nwamadi Joel-jin	South Korea	10.39 [.381]	Q, SB
3	4	He Jinxian	China	10.39 [.383]	Q
4	2	Chan Yat Lok	Hong Kong	10.58	Q
5	8	Leong Lok Io	Macau	10.66	q, =PB
6	6	Favoris Muzrapov	Tajikistan	10.73	
7	7	Alisher Sadulayev	Turkmenistan	10.89	SB
				Wind: (+1.3 m/s)	

==== Heat 2 ====
Place	Lane	Athlete	Nation	Time	Notes
1	4	Chamod Yodasinghe	Sri Lanka	10.40	Q
2	5	Kwok Chun Ting	Hong Kong	10.49	Q
3	6	Vitaliy Zems	Kazakhstan	10.51	Q, SB
4	3	Lalu Muhammad Zohri	Indonesia	10.54	Q, SB
5	7	Zaid Al-Awamleh	Jordan	10.66	q
6	2	Chan Kin Wa	Macau	10.85	SB
7	8	Aayush Kunwar	Nepal	11.27	
				Wind: (−0.5 m/s)	

==== Heat 3 ====
Place	Lane	Athlete	Nation	Time	Notes
1	3	Puripol Boonson	Thailand	10.22	Q
2	7	Akihiro Higashida	Japan	10.29	Q, SB
3	4	Salah Nur Ismail Yunis	Qatar	10.36	Q, PB
4	6	Marc Brian Louis	Singapore	10.37	Q, SB
5	5	Noureddine Hadid	Lebanon	10.62	q
6	2	Khairul Hafiz Jantan	Malaysia	10.71	
7	8	Zulkhuu Otgontugs	Mongolia	11.16	SB
				Wind: (+1.4 m/s)	

==== Heat 4 ====
Place	Lane	Athlete	Nation	Time	Notes
1	4	Malham Al-Balushi	Oman	10.41 [.404]	Q
2	5	Wang Shengjie	China	10.41 [.407]	Q
3	3	Hassan Taftian	Iran	10.47	Q
4	6	Jonathan Nyepa	Malaysia	10.59	Q, SB
5	2	Almat Tulebaev	Kazakhstan	10.81 [.801]	SB
6	8	Rico Adith	Indonesia	10.81 [.801]	SB
7	7	Mohamed Ismail Hossain	Bangladesh	11.03	SB
8	1	Omar Chaaban	Palestine	11.41	SB
				Wind: (−1.1 m/s)	

==== Heat 5 ====
Place	Lane	Athlete	Nation	Time	Notes
1	6	Hiroki Yanagita	Japan	10.25	Q
2	4	Abdullah Abkar Mohammed	Saudi Arabia	10.29	Q
3	5	Seo Min-jun	South Korea	10.35	Q, PB
4	3	Saif Al-Rammahi	Iraq	10.46	Q
5	7	Chutithat Pruksorranan	Thailand	10.62	q, SB
6	1	Ibadulla Adam	Maldives	10.78	SB
7	8	Lukman Gurbandurdyyev	Turkmenistan	10.82	PB
8	2	Shiva Raj Parki	Nepal	11.08	PB
				Wind: (+1.4 m/s)	

=== Semi-finals ===
Held on 28 May. First 2 in each heat (Q) and the next 2 fastest (q) qualified for the semi-finals.

==== Heat 1 ====
Place	Lane	Athlete	Nation	Time	Notes
1	5	Puripol Boonson	Thailand	10.27	Q
2	3	Abdullah Abkar Mohammed	Saudi Arabia	10.34	Q
3	6	Akihiro Higashida	Japan	10.40	q
4	4	Salah Nur Ismail Yunis	Qatar	10.42	
5	2	He Jinxian	China	10.49	
6	1	Zaid Al-Awamleh	Jordan	10.72 [.716]	
7	8	Yat Lok Chan	Hong Kong	10.72 [.717]	
—	7	Lalu Muhammad Zohri	Indonesia	DNS	
				Wind: (−0.6 m/s)	

==== Heat 2 ====
Place	Lane	Athlete	Nation	Time	Notes
1	5	Hiroki Yanagita	Japan	10.35	Q
2	7	Hassan Taftian	Iran	10.41	Q
3	3	Malham Al-Balushi	Oman	10.42	q
4	4	Nwamadi Joel-jin	South Korea	10.50	
5	6	Kwok Chun Ting	Hong Kong	10.52	
6	2	Saif Al-Rammahi	Iraq	10.61	
7	1	Leon Lok Io	Macau	10.72	
8	8	Jonathan Nyepa	Malaysia	10.73	
				Wind: (−0.8 m/s)	

==== Heat 3 ====
Place	Lane	Athlete	Nation	Time	Notes
1	5	Ali Anwar Al-Balushi	Oman	10.32	Q
2	4	Wang Shengjie	China	10.42	Q
3	6	Chamod Yodasinghe	Sri Lanka	10.46	
4	7	Marc Brian Louis	Singapore	10.52	
5	3	Seo Min-jun	South Korea	10.57	
6	2	Vitaliy Zems	Kazakhstan	10.58	
7	1	Chutithat Pruksorranan	Thailand	10.79	
—	8	Noureddine Hadid	Lebanon	DQ	TR 16.8
				Wind: (−0.9 m/s)	

=== Final ===
Place	Lane	Athlete	Nation	Time	Notes
1st place, gold medalist(s)	4	Hiroki Yanagita	Japan	10.20 [.194]	SB
2nd place, silver medalist(s)	3	Puripol Boonson	Thailand	10.20 [.196]	
3rd place, bronze medalist(s)	6	Abdullah Abkar Mohammed	Saudi Arabia	10.30 [.296]	
4	8	Malham Al-Balushi	Oman	10.30 [.299]	
5	7	Wang Shengjie	China	10.31	SB
6	5	Ali Anwar Al-Balushi	Oman	10.33	
7	1	Akihiro Higashida	Japan	10.39	
8	2	Hassan Taftian	Iran	10.41	
				Wind: (+0.6 m/s)	
