= Athletics at the 2018 Asian Games – Men's 100 metres =

Men's 100 metres at the 2018 Asian Games
- Venue: Gelora Bung Karno Stadium
- Date: 25–26 August 2018
- Competitors: 35 from 23 nations

Medalists
gold medal	Su Bingtian	China
silver medal	Tosin Ogunode	Qatar
bronze medal	Ryota Yamagata	Japan

The men's 100 metres competition at the 2018 Asian Games took place on 25 and 26 August 2018 at the Gelora Bung Karno Stadium.

== Schedule ==
All times are Western Indonesia Time (UTC+07:00)

Date	Time	Event
Saturday, 25 August 2018	19:00	Round 1
Sunday, 26 August 2018	18:45	Semifinals
Sunday, 26 August 2018	21:25	Final

== Records ==
Prior to this competition, the existing world, Asian and Games records were as follows.

World Record	Usain Bolt (JAM)	9.58	Berlin, Germany	16 August 2009
Asian Record	Femi Ogunode (QAT); Femi Ogunode (QAT); Su Bingtian (CHN); Su Bingtian (CHN)	9.91	Wuhan, China; Gainesville, United States; Madrid, Spain; Paris, France	4 June 2015; 22 April 2016; 22 June 2018; 30 June 2018
Games Record	Femi Ogunode (QAT)	9.93	Incheon, South Korea	28 September 2014

== Results ==
=== Round 1 ===
- Qualification: First 4 in each heat (Q) and the next 4 fastest (q) advance to the semifinals.

==== Heat 1 ====
- Wind: −0.1 m/s

Rank	Athlete	Time	Notes
1	Tosin Ogunode (QAT)	10.16	Q
2	Ryota Yamagata (JPN)	10.19	Q
3	Kim Kuk-young (KOR)	10.43	Q
4	Bandit Chuangchai (THA)	10.57	Q
5	Liaquat Ali (PAK)	11.01	
6	Pen Sokong (CAM)	11.10	
7	Vitaliy Zems (KAZ)	11.10	

==== Heat 2 ====
- Wind: +0.6 m/s

Rank	Athlete	Time	Notes
1	Yang Chun-han (TPE)	10.13	Q
2	Asuka Cambridge (JPN)	10.23	Q
3	Tsui Chi Ho (HKG)	10.57	Q
4	Chayut Khongprasit (THA)	10.62	Q
5	Saeed Al-Khaldi (BRN)	10.69	q
6	Fatek Adnan (OMA)	10.85	
7	Abdul Wahab Zahiri (AFG)	11.65	

==== Heat 3 ====
- Wind: 0.0 m/s

Rank	Athlete	Time	Notes
1	Lalu Muhammad Zohri (INA)	10.27	Q
2	Xu Zhouzheng (CHN)	10.40	Q
3	Khairul Hafiz Jantan (MAS)	10.47	Q
4	Oh Kyong-soo (KOR)	10.62	Q
5	Jo Kum-ryong (PRK)	10.76	
6	Alexandr Kasper (KAZ)	10.83	
7	Yam Sajan Sunar (NEP)	11.39	

==== Heat 4 ====
- Wind: −0.6 m/s

Rank	Athlete	Time	Notes
1	Su Bingtian (CHN)	10.27	Q
2	Jonathan Nyepa (MAS)	10.43	Q
3	Wang Wei-hsu (TPE)	10.55	Q
4	Ng Ka Fung (HKG)	10.65	Q
5	Hassan Saaid (MDV)	10.67	q
6	Noureddine Hadid (LBN)	10.76	
7	Fakhri Ismail (BRU)	10.83	

==== Heat 5 ====
- Wind: +0.7 m/s

Rank	Athlete	Time	Notes
1	Abdullah Abkar Mohammed (KSA)	10.15	Q
2	Barakat Al-Harthi (OMA)	10.21	Q
3	Andrew Fisher (BRN)	10.31	Q
4	Hassan Taftian (IRI)	10.35	Q
5	Yaspi Boby (INA)	10.62	q
6	Gohar Shahbaz (PAK)	10.66	q
7	Aksonesath Lathsavong (LAO)	11.29	

=== Semifinals ===
- Qualification: First 2 in each heat (Q) and the next 2 fastest (q) advance to the final.

==== Heat 1 ====
- Wind: −0.2 m/s

Rank	Athlete	Time	Notes
1	Abdullah Abkar Mohammed (KSA)	10.21	Q
2	Lalu Muhammad Zohri (INA)	10.24	Q
3	Xu Zhouzheng (CHN)	10.36	
4	Andrew Fisher (BRN)	10.37	
5	Wang Wei-hsu (TPE)	10.46	
6	Bandit Chuangchai (THA)	10.57	
7	Ng Ka Fung (HKG)	10.59	
8	Hassan Saaid (MDV)	10.63	

==== Heat 2 ====
- Wind: +0.2 m/s

Rank	Athlete	Time	Notes
1	Su Bingtian (CHN)	10.16	Q
2	Tosin Ogunode (QAT)	10.20	Q
3	Asuka Cambridge (JPN)	10.36	
4	Jonathan Nyepa (MAS)	10.46	
5	Oh Kyong-soo (KOR)	10.61	
6	Yaspi Boby (INA)	10.70	
7	Tsui Chi Ho (HKG)	10.76	
8	Gohar Shahbaz (PAK)	10.80	

==== Heat 3 ====
- Wind: +0.9 m/s

Rank	Athlete	Time	Notes
1	Ryota Yamagata (JPN)	10.10	Q
2	Yang Chun-han (TPE)	10.17	Q
3	Hassan Taftian (IRI)	10.17	q
4	Kim Kuk-young (KOR)	10.33	q
5	Barakat Al-Harthi (OMA)	10.33	
6	Khairul Hafiz Jantan (MAS)	10.45	
7	Chayut Khongprasit (THA)	10.63	
8	Saeed Al-Khaldi (BRN)	10.67	

=== Final ===
- Wind: +0.8 m/s

Rank	Athlete	Time	Notes
1st place, gold medalist(s)	Su Bingtian (CHN)	9.92	GR
2nd place, silver medalist(s)	Tosin Ogunode (QAT)	10.00	
3rd place, bronze medalist(s)	Ryota Yamagata (JPN)	10.00	
4	Abdullah Abkar Mohammed (KSA)	10.10	
5	Yang Chun-han (TPE)	10.17	
6	Hassan Taftian (IRI)	10.19	
7	Lalu Muhammad Zohri (INA)	10.20	
8	Kim Kuk-young (KOR)	10.26	
