= 2022 Japan Championships in Athletics =

106th Japan Championships in Athletics
- Edition: 106th
- Dates: 9–12 June
- Host city: Osaka, Japan
- Venue: Yanmar Stadium Nagai
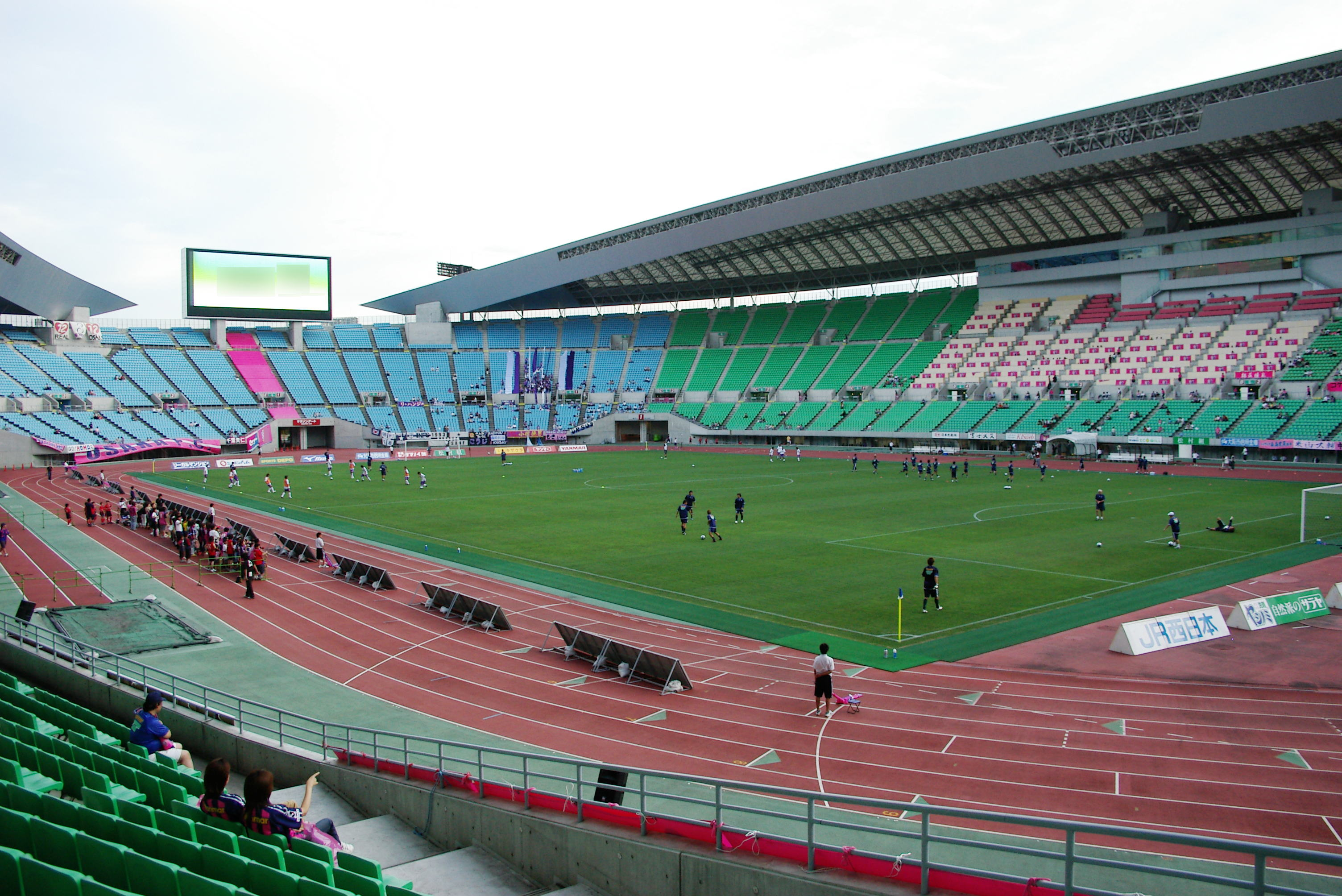
- Level: Senior
- Type: Outdoor

The 106th Japan Championships in Athletics (第106回日本陸上競技選手権大会, Dai 106 kai Nihon Rikujō Kyōgi Sensyuken Taikai) was held at Nagai Stadium in Osaka. Organised by JAAF, the four-day competition took place from 9–12 June and served as the national championships in track and field for Japan.

The schedule of events other than this tournament is as follows:

- 35 kilometres race walk - 17 April (Wajima City)
- 10,000 m - 7 May (National Stadium)
- Combined - 4–5 June (Akita Prefectural Central Park Athletics Stadium, Akita)
- Relays - 1 and 2 October (National)
- Indoor competition - 4 February 2023 (Osaka Castle Hall, Osaka)
- 20 kilometres race walk - 19 February 2023 (Rokkō Island, Kobe)
- Cross-country race - 2 February 2023 (Uminonakamichi Seaside Park, Fukuoka)

== Results ==
=== Men ===
- Complete results

Event	Gold		Silver		Bronze	
100 metres (wind: +1.1 m/s)	Abdul Hakim Sani Brown; Tumbleweed TC	10.08 s	Ryūichirō Sakai [[]]	10.10 s	Hiroki Yanagita [[]]	10.19 s
200 metres +1.7	Koki Ueyama; Sumitomo Electric	20.46 s	Yuki Koike [[]]	20.62 s	Ryota Suzuki [[]]	20.64 s
400 metres	Fuga Sato [[]]	45.49 s	Kaito Kawabata [[]]	46.00 s	Alan Meldrum [[]]	46.05 s
800 metres	Mikuto Kaneko [[]]	1:47.07 min	Kentaro Usuda [[]]	1:47.42 min	Daiki Nemoto [[]]	1:. min
1500 metres	Kazuto Iizawa [[]]	3:42.82 min	Rikuto Ijima [[]]	3:43.17 min	Keisuke Morita [[]]	3:43.21 min
5000 metres	Hyuga Endo [[]]	13:22.13 min	Hiroki Matsueda [[]]	13:30.15 min	Kanta Shimizu [[]]	13:31.51 min
110 m hurdles (-1.2)	Shunsuke Izumiya; Juntendo University	13.21 s	Rachid Muratake [[]]	13.31 s	Shuhei Ishikawa [[]]	13.48 s
400 m hurdles	Kazuki Kurokawa [[]]	48.89 s	Hiroya Kawagoe [[]]	49.72 s	Masaki Toyoda [[]]	49.85 s
3000 m s'chase	Ryuji Miura; Juntendo University	8:14.47 min CR	Ryoma Aoki [[]]	8:20.09 min	Kosei Yamaguchi; Honda	8:23.29 min
35 km walk	Masatora Kawano; Aichi Steel	2:26:40 h	[[]] Physical Training School JSDF	2:42:34 h	[[]] Niigata Albirex RC	2:43:31 h
High jump	Tomohiro Shinno; Japan Airlines	2.30 m	Keitaro Fujita [[]]	2.20 m	Ryoichi Akamatsu; Naoto Hasegawa [[]]	2.20 m
Pole vault	Masaki Ejima; Tokio Marine & Nichido CS	5.60 m	Tomoya Karasawa [[]]	5.50 m	Takuma Ishikawa [[]]	5.40 m
Long jump	Yuki Hashioka [[]]	8.27 m	Hibiki Tsuha [[]]	8.07 m (w)	Keisuke Matsumoto [[]]	8.07 m +1.9
Triple jump	Riku Ito [[]]	16.57 m	Yuto Adachi [[]]	16.22 m -1.5	Hikaru Ikehata [[]]	16.14 m +0.8
Shot put	Hikaru Murakami [[]]	18.64 m	Jason Atuobeng [[]]	18.08 m	Hitoshi Okumura [[]]	18.02 m
Discus throw	Yuji Tsutsumi; Alsok Gunma	59.29 m	Masateru Yugami; Toyota	59.43 m	Shinichi Yukinaga; Shikoku University	56.49 m
Hammer throw	Ryota Kashimura; Nihon University	72.77 m	Takahiro Kobata; Yamada Holdings	71.34 m	Tatsuto Nakagawa; Zenrin	70.44 m
Javelin throw	Genki Dean; Mizuno Corporation	81.02 m	Kenji Ogura [[]]	80.25 m	Ryohei Arai [[]]	78.05 m
Decathlon	Keisuke Okuda [[]]	7626 pts	[[]] [[]]	7 pts	[[]] [[]]	76 pts
