= Athletics at the 2022 Asian Games – Men's 200 metres =

Men's 200 metres at the 2022 Asian Games
- Venue: Hangzhou Olympic Expo Main Stadium
- Date: 1–2 October 2023
- Competitors: 32 from 24 nations

Medalists
| gold medal | Koki Ueyama | Japan |
| silver medal | Abdullah Abkar Mohammed | Saudi Arabia |
| bronze medal | Yang Chun-han | Chinese Taipei |

The men's 200 metres competition at the 2022 Asian Games took place on 1 and 2 October 2023 at the HOC Stadium, Hangzhou.

== Schedule ==
All times are China Standard Time (UTC+08:00)

| Date | Time | Event |
|---|---|---|
| Sunday, 1 October 2023 | 10:15 | Round 1 |
| Sunday, 1 October 2023 | 19:55 | Semifinals |
| Monday, 2 October 2023 | 19:55 | Final |

== Records ==
Prior to this competition, the existing world, Asian and Games records were as follows.

| World Record | Usain Bolt (JAM) | 19.19 | Berlin, Germany | 20 August 2009 |
| Asian Record | Xie Zhenye (CHN) | 19.88 | London, Great Britain | 21 July 2019 |
| Games Record | Femi Ogunode (QAT) | 20.14 | Incheon, South Korea | 1 October 2014 |

== Results ==
Legend

- DNF — Did not finish
- DSQ — Disqualified

=== Round 1 ===
- Qualification: First 3 in each heat (Q) and the next 4 fastest (q) advance to the semifinals.

==== Heat 1 ====
- Wind: 0.0 m/s

| Rank | Athlete | Time | Notes |
|---|---|---|---|
| 1 | Yang Chun-han (TPE) | 20.98 | Q |
| 2 | Shin Min-kyu (KOR) | 21.03 | Q |
| 3 | Mohamed Obaid Al-Saadi (OMA) | 21.24 | Q |
| 4 | Mark Lee (SGP) | 21.44 | q |
| 5 | Noureddine Hadid (LBN) | 21.61 | |
| 6 | Sorsy Phompakdy (LAO) | 21.92 | |
| 7 | Ibrahim Nahil Nizar (MDV) | 22.98 | |
| 8 | Erdenebatyn Turtogtokh (MGL) | 23.21 | |

==== Heat 2 ====
- Wind: −0.7 m/s

| Rank | Athlete | Time | Notes |
|---|---|---|---|
| 1 | Koki Ueyama (JPN) | 20.82 | Q |
| 2 | Sui Gaofei (CHN) | 21.14 | Q |
| 3 | Puripol Boonson (THA) | 21.26 | Q |
| 4 | Abdulaziz Atafi (KSA) | 21.29 | q |
| 5 | Otgontögsiin Zulkhüü (MGL) | 22.04 | |
| 6 | Chan Chun Ho (HKG) | 22.12 | |
| 7 | Favoris Muzrapov (TJK) | 22.32 | |
| 8 | Ahmed Najudhaan Abdulla (MDV) | 23.27 | |

==== Heat 3 ====
- Wind: −3.0 m/s

| Rank | Athlete | Time | Notes |
|---|---|---|---|
| 1 | Femi Ogunode (QAT) | 20.83 | Q |
| 2 | Ko Seung-hwan (KOR) | 21.00 | Q |
| 3 | Saeed Al-Khaldi (BRN) | 21.33 | Q |
| 4 | Shajar Abbas (PAK) | 21.53 | |
| 5 | Vong Ka In (MAC) | 22.37 | |
| 6 | Tshering Penjor (BHU) | 22.83 | |
| 7 | Ruslan Litovskii (KGZ) | 22.86 | |
| — | Sha Mahmood Noor Zahi (AFG) | DSQ | |

==== Heat 4 ====
- Wind: −0.1 m/s

| Rank | Athlete | Time | Notes |
|---|---|---|---|
| 1 | Abdullah Abkar Mohammed (KSA) | 20.78 | Q |
| 2 | Shoto Uno (JPN) | 20.87 | Q |
| 3 | Amlan Borgohain (IND) | 21.08 | Q |
| 4 | Russel Taib (MAS) | 21.31 | q |
| 5 | Rashid Al-Aasmi (OMA) | 21.35 | q |
| 6 | Chan Kin Wa (MAC) | 21.54 | |
| 7 | Shak Kam Ching (HKG) | 21.99 | |
| 8 | Yatpitou Chantivea (CAM) | 22.61 | |

=== Semifinals ===
- Qualification: First 3 in each heat (Q) and the next 2 fastest (q) advance to the final.

==== Heat 1 ====
- Wind: +0.8 m/s

| Rank | Athlete | Time | Notes |
|---|---|---|---|
| 1 | Abdullah Abkar Mohammed (KSA) | 20.59 | Q |
| 2 | Saeed Al-Khaldi (BRN) | 20.61 | Q |
| 3 | Yang Chun-han (TPE) | 20.67 | Q |
| 4 | Shoto Uno (JPN) | 20.77 | q |
| 5 | Amlan Borgohain (IND) | 21.03 | q |
| 6 | Shin Min-kyu (KOR) | 21.07 | |
| 7 | Rashid Al-Aasmi (OMA) | 21.32 | |
| 8 | Russel Taib (MAS) | 21.53 | |

==== Heat 2 ====
- Wind: −0.9 m/s

| Rank | Athlete | Time | Notes |
|---|---|---|---|
| 1 | Femi Ogunode (QAT) | 20.75 | Q |
| 2 | Koki Ueyama (JPN) | 20.77 | Q |
| 3 | Ko Seung-hwan (KOR) | 20.87 | Q |
| 4 | Sui Gaofei (CHN) | 21.04 | |
| 5 | Abdulaziz Atafi (KSA) | 21.14 | |
| 6 | Mohamed Obaid Al-Saadi (OMA) | 21.32 | |
| 7 | Mark Lee (SGP) | 21.61 | |
| — | Puripol Boonson (THA) | DNF | |

=== Final ===
- Wind: −0.2 m/s

| Rank | Athlete | Time | Notes |
|---|---|---|---|
| 1st place, gold medalist(s) | Koki Ueyama (JPN) | 20.60 | |
| 2nd place, silver medalist(s) | Abdullah Abkar Mohammed (KSA) | 20.63 | |
| 3rd place, bronze medalist(s) | Yang Chun-han (TPE) | 20.74 | |
| 4 | Femi Ogunode (QAT) | 20.75 | |
| 5 | Saeed Al-Khaldi (BRN) | 20.88 | |
| 6 | Amlan Borgohain (IND) | 20.98 | |
| 7 | Ko Seung-hwan (KOR) | 21.06 | |
| 8 | Shoto Uno (JPN) | 21.07 | |
