= 2019 Asian Athletics Championships – Men's 4 × 100 metres relay =

Men's 4 × 100 metres relay at the 2019 Asian Athletics Championships
- Venue: Khalifa International Stadium
- Location: Doha, Qatar
- Dates: 22 April (heats); 23 April (final)
- Nations: 12
- Winning time: 38.99

Medalists
gold medal	Sowan Ruttanapon; Bandit Chuangchai; Jirapong Meenapra; Siripol Punpa	Thailand
silver medal	Wei Yi-ching; Wang Wei-hsu; Yang Chun-han; Lin Hung-min	Chinese Taipei
bronze medal	Mohammed Al-Balushi; Barakat Al-Harthi; Mohamed Obaid Al-Saadi; Ammar Al-Saifi	Oman

The men's 4 × 100 metres relay event at the 2019 Asian Athletics Championships was held on 22 and 23 April.

== Results ==
=== Heats ===
Rank	Heat	Nation	Athletes	Time	Notes
1	1	Thailand	Sowan Ruttanapon, Bandit Chuangchai, Jirapong Meenapra, Siripol Punpa	38.72	Q, CR, NR
2	2	China	Wu Zhiqiang, Xu Zhouzheng, Liang Jinsheng, Jiang Hengnan	39.06	Q, SB
3	1	South Korea	Kim Kuk-young, Lee Jae-ha, Ko Seung-hwan, Lee Jae-seong	39.22	Q, SB
4	2	Chinese Taipei	Wei Yi-ching, Wang Wei-hsu, Yang Chun-han, Lin Hung-min	39.33	Q, SB
5	1	Oman	Mohammed Al-Balushi, Barakat Al-Harthi, Mohamed Obaid Al-Saadi, Ammar Al-Saifi	39.41	Q, NR
6	2	Philippines	Francis Medina, Anfernee Lopena, Clinton Bautista, Eric Cray	39.57	Q, SB
7	1	Hong Kong	Tang Yik Chun, Lee Hong Kit, Tse Yee Hin Rico, Tsui Chi Ho	39.70	q, SB
8	1	Saudi Arabia	Ahmed Mabrouk Al-Majrashi, Mohamed Daoud Abdullah, Fahhad Mohammed Al-Subaie, Ali Khalid Mas	39.88	q
9	2	Indonesia	Mochammad Bisma Diwa Abina, Eko Rimbawan, Joko Kuncoro Adi, Bayu Kertanegara	39.96	SB
10	2	Qatar	Abdelaziz Mohamed, Jaber Hilal Al-Mamari, Mahamat Zakaria Khalid, Owaab Barrow	40.17	SB
11	3	Maldives	Hassan Nujoom, Sarees Ahmed, Ibadulla Adam, Hassan Saaid	41.80	
	2	Kazakhstan	Vitaliy Zems, Damil Sutzhanov, Sergey Russak, Alexandr Kasper	DNF	
	1	Singapore		DNS	

=== Final ===
Rank	Lane	Team	Name	Time	Notes
1st place, gold medalist(s)	5	Thailand	Sowan Ruttanapon, Bandit Chuangchai, Jirapong Meenapra, Siripol Punpa	38.99	
2nd place, silver medalist(s)	4	Chinese Taipei	Wei Yi-ching, Wang Wei-hsu, Yang Chun-han, Lin Hung-min	39.18	SB
3rd place, bronze medalist(s)	8	Oman	Mohammed Al-Balushi, Barakat Al-Harthi, Mohamed Obaid Al-Saadi, Ammar Al-Saifi	39.36	NR
4	3	Saudi Arabia	Ahmed Mabrouk Al-Majrashi, Mohamed Daoud Abdullah, Fahhad Mohammed Al-Subaie, Ahmad Khader Al-Muwallad	39.52	SB
5	2	Hong Kong	Tang Yik Chun, Lee Hong Kit, Tse Yee Hin Rico, Tsui Chi Ho	39.91	
6	9	Philippines	Francis Medina, Anfernee Lopena, Clinton Bautista, Eric Cray	40.10	
	6	China	Wu Zhiqiang, Xie Zhenye, Liang Jinsheng, Jiang Hengnan	DQ	R163.3a
	7	South Korea		DNS	
