= Ryoichi Akamatsu =

Japanese high jumper (born 1995)

Personal information
- Native name: Japanese: 赤松 諒一
- Full name: Ryōichi Akamatsu
- Nationality: Japan
- Born: 2 May 1995 (age 31) Gifu Prefecture
- Education: Gifu University; Gifu University of Medical Science
- Height: 184 cm (6 ft 0 in)
- Weight: 60 kg (132 lb)

Sport
- Sport: Athletics
- Event: High jump
- Coached by: Ryohei Hayashi

Achievements and titles
- National finals: 2015 Japanese Champs; • High jump, 8th; 2016 Japanese Champs; • High jump, 4th; 2017 Japanese Champs; • High jump, 5th; 2018 Japanese Champs; • High jump, 6th; 2019 Japanese Champs; • High jump, 7th; 2020 Japanese Champs; • High jump, 6th; 2021 Japanese Indoors; • High jump, 5th; 2021 Japanese Champs; • High jump, 7th; 2022 Japanese Indoors; • High jump, 2nd (silver); 2022 Japanese Champs; • High jump, 3rd (bronze); 2023 Japanese Indoors; • High jump, 1st (gold); 2023 Japanese Champs; • High jump, 1st (gold)
- Personal best: HJ: 2.30 m (2023)
Medal record
Men's athletics
Representing Japan
Asian Indoor Championships
Gold medal – first place	2023 Astana	High jump
Gold medal – first place	2024 Tehran	High jump
- Updated on 20 February 2024

Ryoichi Akamatsu (Japanese: 赤松 諒一; born 2 May 1995), also spelled Ryōichi Akamatsu, is a Japanese high jumper from Gifu Prefecture. He is a two-time Asian Indoor Champion in the high jump, and he won the 2023 Japanese Athletics Championships before placing 8th at the World Championships that year.

== Career ==
Akamatsu began high jumping as early as 2013, when he finished 3rd at the Japanese high school championships representing Kano High School. Until 2022, he had only jumped twice outside of Japan — once at the Taiwan Athletics Open Meeting in 2016, and once at the 2019 China–Japan–Korea Friendship Athletic Meeting in South Korea where he finished 3rd.

By tying for 3rd place at the 2022 Japanese Athletics Championships, Akamatsu was selected to represent Japan for the first time at the 2022 World Athletics Championships. At the championships, he placed 19th in qualification and did not advance to the finals.

After winning his first national title at the 2023 Japanese Indoor Championships, Akamatsu competed at the 2023 Asian Indoor Athletics Championships, where he won the gold medal. He defended his title at the 2023 Japanese Athletics Championships, earning him qualification to represent Japan at the Asian Championships where he finished 5th. Following that competition, he set his personal best of 2.30 metres at the Twilight Games in Tokyo, making him the 6th-highest Japanese jumper in history.

At the 2023 World Championships, Akamatsu qualified for his first global final and finished 8th. He didn't jump as high in the finals as he did in the preliminary round, claiming he was overworked. He ended his season at the 2023 Asian Games in Hangzhou, finishing tied for 2nd in qualification and 6th in the final.

In February 2024, Akamatsu defended his Asian Indoor Championships high jump title in Tehran.

== Personal life ==
Born in Gifu Prefecture, Akamatsu attended Kano High School and studied Gifu University for college and graduate school. He played basketball as a child, and the feeling of doing a layup inspired him to compete in the high jump. He works as a data engineer and research student at Gifu University of Medical Science, where part of his research is focused on improving jumping technique in his event.

Akamatsu enjoys camping in his free time, most often in Meihō, Gifu. He started playing Pokémon games after seeing Shunya Takayama and Shuhei Ishikawa playing the Pokémon Trading Card Game at the 2023 Asian Games.

== Statistics ==
=== Personal best progression ===
High Jump progression
#	Mark	Pl.	Competition	Venue	Date	Ref.
1	2.10 m	3rd place, bronze medalist(s)	Japanese High School Championships	Oita, Japan	1 Aug 2013	
2	2.11 m	1st place, gold medalist(s)		Gifu, Japan	12 Sep 2014	
3	2.18 m	1st place, gold medalist(s)		Gifu, Japan	10 Oct 2014	
4	2.25 m	1st place, gold medalist(s)	Osaka Japanese University Championships	Osaka, Japan	13 Sep 2015	
5	2.28 m	1st place, gold medalist(s)	Yokosuka City Autumn Meeting	Yokosuka, Japan	2 Nov 2020	
6	2.29 m	1st place, gold medalist(s)	Japanese Athletics Championships	Osaka, Japan	3 Jun 2023	
7	2.30 m	1st place, gold medalist(s)	Twilight Games	Tokyo, Japan	21 Jul 2023	
