= 2025 Asian Athletics Championships – Men's 200 metres =

Men's 200 metres at the 2025 Asian Athletics Championships
- Venue: Gumi Civic Stadium
- Location: Gumi, South Korea
- Dates: 30 May (heats & semi-finals); 31 May (final)
- Winning time: 20.12 CR

Medalists
gold medal	Towa Uzawa	Japan
silver medal	Abdulaziz Abdui Atafi	Saudi Arabia
bronze medal	Animesh Kujur	India

The men's 200 metres event at the 2025 Asian Athletics Championships was held on 30 and 31 May.

== Records ==
Records before the 2025 Asian Athletics Championships
Record	Athlete (nation)	Time (s)	Location	Date
World record	Usain Bolt (JAM)	19.19	Berlin, Germany	20 August 2009
Asian record	Xie Zhenye (CHN)	19.88	London, United Kingdom	21 July 2019
Championship record	Towa Uzawa (JPN)	20.23	Bangkok, Thailand	16 July 2023
World leading	Kenny Bednarek (USA)	19.84	Miramar, United States	4 May 2025
Asian leading	Towa Uzawa (JPN)	20.13	Fukuroi, Japan	18 May 2025

== Schedule ==
The event schedule, in local time (UTC+9), was as follows:

Date	Time	Round
30 May	11:10	Heats
30 May	19:25	Semi-finals
31 May	17:30	Final

== Results ==
=== Heats ===
Held on 30 May. First 3 in each heat (Q) and the next 4 fastest (q) qualified for the semi-finals.

==== Heat 1 ====
Place	Lane	Athlete	Nation	Time	Notes
1	6	Shōta Iizuka	Japan	20.89	Q
2	5	Animesh Kujur	India	20.98	Q
3	4	Ildar Akhmadiev	Tajikistan	21.51	Q, SB
4	3	Magnus Johannsson	Hong Kong	21.57	q
5	7	Muhammad Sayyid Amin bin Roslan	Malaysia	21.83	SB
6	2	Zulkhuu Otgontugs	Mongolia	22.70	SB
—	8	Aayush Kunwar	Nepal	DNF	
				Wind: (−0.3 m/s)	

==== Heat 2 ====
Place	Lane	Athlete	Nation	Time	Notes
1	5	Towa Uzawa	Japan	20.94	Q
2	6	Chen Jinfeng	China	21.12	Q
3	7	Yip King Wai	Hong Kong	21.25	Q
4	3	Witali Zems	Kazakhstan	21.38	q
5	4	Russel Alexander Nasir Taib	Malaysia	21.71	SB
6	8	Favoris Muzrapov	Tajikistan	22.11	SB
7	2	Shivaraj Parki	Nepal	22.68	SB
				Wind: (−1.0 m/s)	

==== Heat 3 ====
Place	Lane	Athlete	Nation	Time	Notes
1	5	Ali Anwar Al-Balushi	Oman	21.71	Q
2	6	Kalinga Kumarage	Sri Lanka	21.73	Q
3	7	Noureddine Hadid	Lebanon	21.74	Q
4	4	Almat Tulebaev	Kazakhstan	22.01 [.001]	SB
5	8	Leong Lok Io	Macau	22.01 [.004]	
6	3	Turtogtokh Erdenebat	Mongolia	23.74	SB
				Wind: (+0.6 m/s)	

==== Heat 4 ====
Place	Lane	Athlete	Nation	Time	Notes
1	5	Abdulaziz Abdui Atafi	Saudi Arabia	20.61	Q, SB
2	3	Ko Seung-hwan	South Korea	20.69	Q, SB
3	6	Shi Junhao	China	20.76	Q
4	2	Suleiman Abdulrahman	United Arab Emirates	20.94	q, =NU20R
5	7	Shajar Abbas	Pakistan	21.15	q, SB
6	1	Zaid Al-Awamleh	Jordan	21.64	SB
7	8	Vong Ka In	Macau	22.44	
8	4	Omar Chaaban	Palestine	22.92	SB
				Wind: (+1.0 m/s)	

=== Semi-finals ===
Held on 30 May. First 3 in each heat (Q) and the next 2 fastest (q) qualified for the final.

==== Heat 1 ====
Place	Lane	Athlete	Nation	Time	Notes
1	7	Ko Seung-hwan	South Korea	20.82 [.816]	Q
2	6	Shōta Iizuka	Japan	20.82 [.820]	Q
3	5	Abdulaziz Abdui Atafi	Saudi Arabia	20.83	Q
4	4	Shi Junhao	China	20.98	q
5	1	Suleiman Abdulrahman	United Arab Emirates	21.30	
6	8	Noureddine Hadid	Lebanon	21.57	
7	2	Magnus Johannsson	Hong Kong	21.70	
8	3	Zaid Al-Awamleh	Jordan	21.90	
				Wind: (+-2.4 m/s)	

==== Heat 2 ====
Place	Lane	Athlete	Nation	Time	Notes
1	5	Towa Uzawa	Japan	20.67	Q
2	7	Animesh Kujur	India	20.81	Q
3	3	Chen Jinfeng	China	20.88	Q
4	4	Yip King Wai	Hong Kong	21.10	q, PB
5	2	Witali Zems	Kazakhstan	21.25	
6	1	Shajar Abbas	Pakistan	21.27	
7	6	Ali Anwar Al-Balushi	Oman	21.30	
8	8	Ildar Akhmadiev	Tajikistan	21.62	
				Wind: (−0.9 m/s)	

=== Final ===
Place	Lane	Athlete	Nation	Time	Notes
1st place, gold medalist(s)	5	Towa Uzawa	Japan	20.12	CR, PB
2nd place, silver medalist(s)	4	Abdulaziz Abdui Atafi	Saudi Arabia	20.31	PB
3rd place, bronze medalist(s)	7	Animesh Kujur	India	20.32	NR
4	3	Shōta Iizuka	Japan	20.66	SB
5	8	Chen Jinfeng	China	20.70	PB
6	6	Ko Seung-hwan	South Korea	20.72	
7	2	Yip King Wai	Hong Kong	21.16	
—	1	Shi Junhao	China	DQ	TR 16.8
				Wind: (+0.8 m/s)	
