= Koki Ueyama =

Japanese sprinter

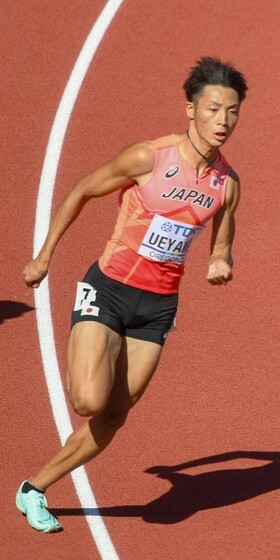
- Koki Ueyama in 2022

Personal information
- Nationality: Japanese
- Born: 15 May 1999 (age 27) Matsusaka, Mie Prefecture, Japan

Sport
- Sport: Athletics
- Event: Sprinting
Medal record
Men's athletics
Representing Japan
Asian Games
Gold medal – first place	2022 Hangzhou	200 m
Silver medal – second place	2022 Hangzhou	4 × 100 metres relay
Asian Championships
Bronze medal – third place	2023 Bangkok	200 m
Japan Athletics Championships
Gold medal – first place	2022 Osaka	200m

Koki Ueyama (上山 紘輝, Ueyama Koki; born 15 May 1999) is a Japanese sprinter.

== Career ==
He qualified to participate at the 2018 IAAF World U20 Championships and competed in the men's 200m and in the men's 4 × 100 metres relay events. During the 2018 IAAF World U20 Championships, he finished the heat event of the 200m race with a timing of 21.04 seconds, which propelled him to compete in the semi-finals of the 200m race.

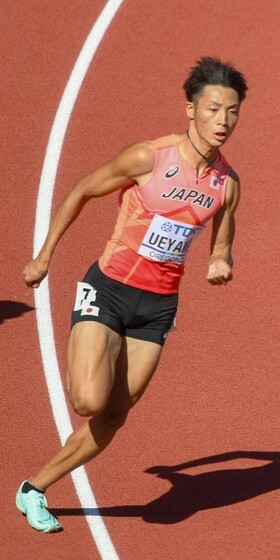
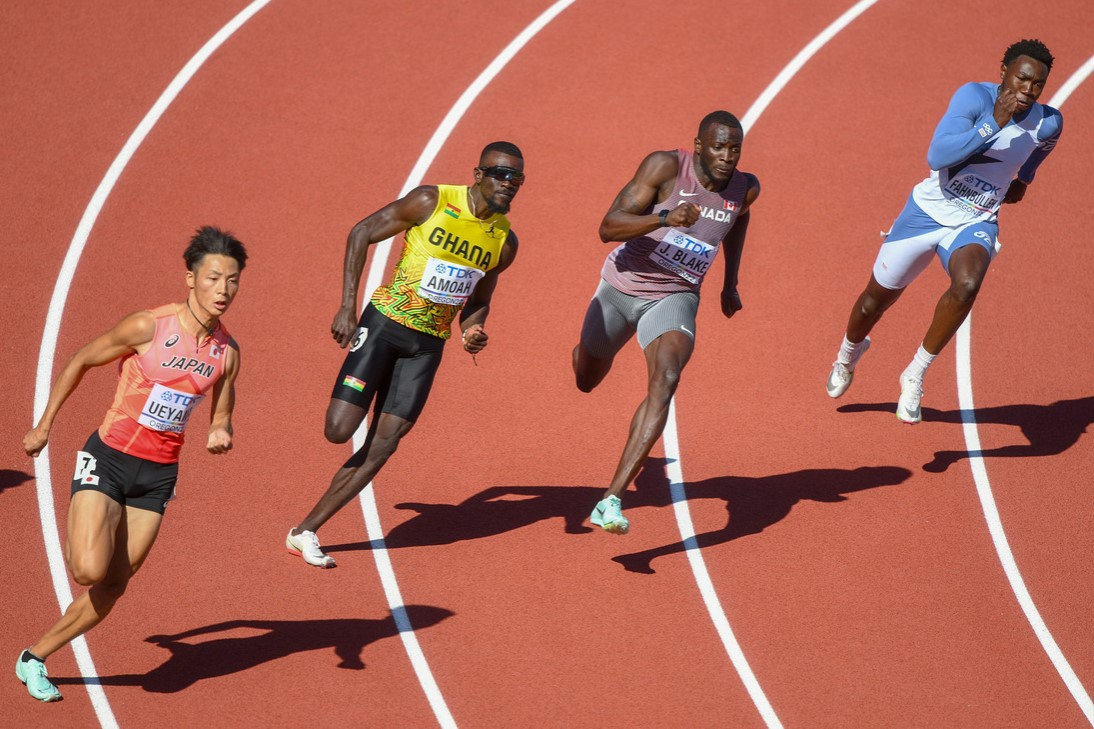
Koki Ueyama (on the left) runs alongside Ghana's Joseph Amoah, Canada's Jerome Blake and Liberia's Joseph Fahnbulleh in the men's 200m event at the 2022 World Athletics Championships

He represented Japan at the 2022 World Athletics Championships and competed in the men's 200m and men's 4 × 100 metres relay events. He reached the semi-finals of the men's 200m event during the 2022 World Athletics Championships after an impressive finish in the heat event with a timing of 20.26 seconds. In June 2022, he secured a gold medal in the men's 200m event at the 106th edition of the Japan Championships in Athletics.

Koki Ueyama represented Japan at the 2023 Asian Athletics Championships and claimed a bronze medal in the men's 200m event. He also represented Japan at the 2023 World Athletics Championships and competed in the men's 200m event.

He represented Japan at the 2022 Asian Games and took part in the men's 200m event. He clinched a gold medal in the final of the men's 200m race, which turned out to be a close-fought contest as he edged past Saudi Arabia's Abdullah Abkar Mohammed by the barest of margins with only a difference of 0.03 seconds. He also secured Japan's first track and field gold medal during the course of the 2022 Asian Games. Initially, Qatari track and field athlete Femi Ogunode took the lead for the front half of the race, and Koki Ueyama then managed to claim the lead in the 200m final, and Koki eventually won the race with a timing of 20.60 seconds. He was also one of the members of the Japanese team which secured bronze in the men's 4 × 100 metres relay final during the 2022 Asian Games.
