= 2023 Japan Championships in Athletics =

107th Japan Championships in Athletics
- Edition: 107th
- Dates: 1–4 June
- Host city: Osaka, Japan
- Venue: Yanmar Stadium Nagai
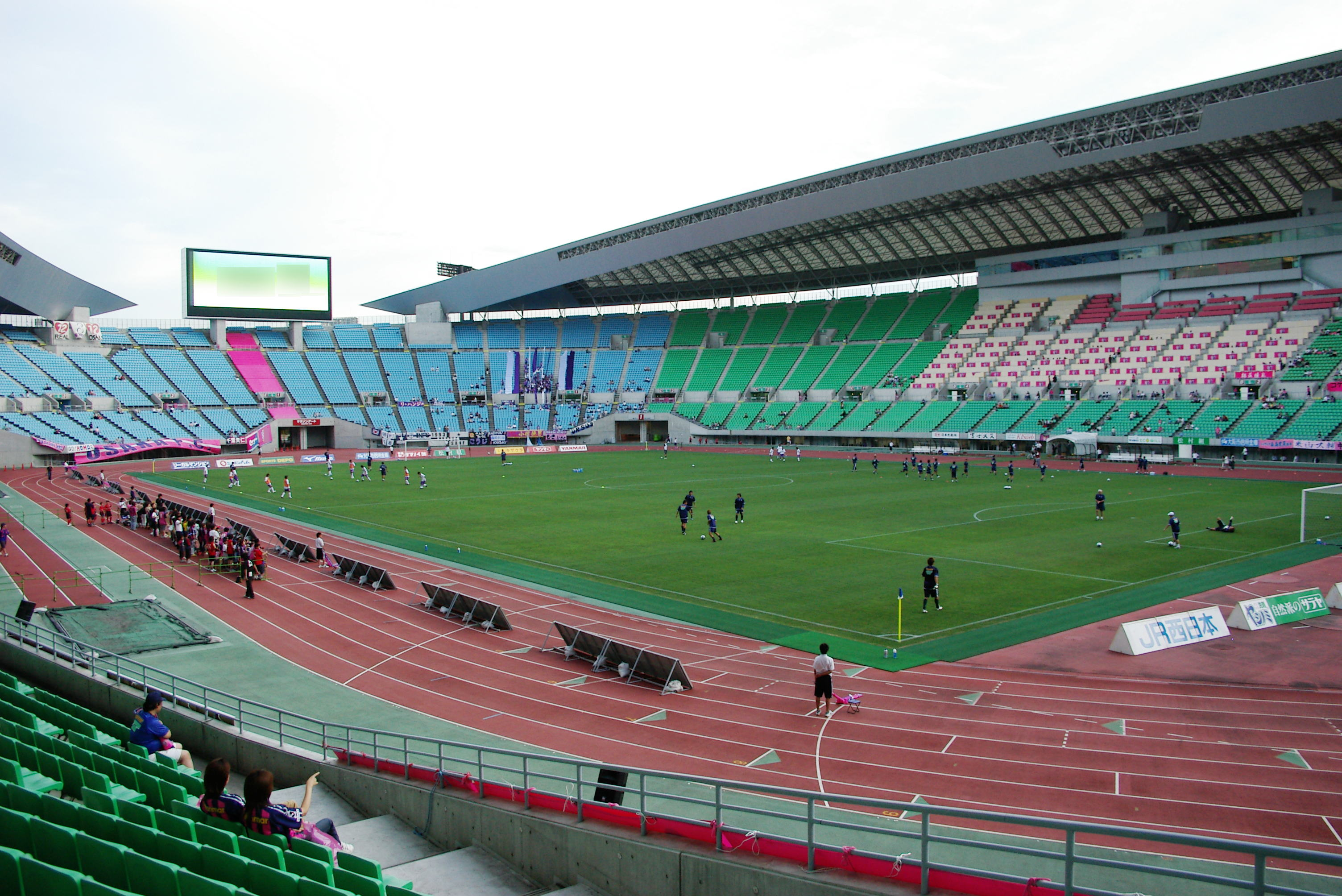
- Level: Senior
- Type: Outdoor

The 107th Japan Championships in Athletics (第107回日本陸上競技選手権大会, Dai 107 kai Nihon Rikujō Kyōgi Sensyuken Taikai) was held at Nagai Stadium in Osaka. Organised by JAAF, the four-day competition took place from 1–4 June and served as the national championships in track and field for Japan.

This competition was also for the qualifying trial for the Japan team at the 2023 World Championships.

The schedule of events other than this tournament is as follows:

- 35 kilometres race walk - 16 April (Wajima City)
- 10,000 m -
- Combined - 6–7 May at the Nagai Stadium
- Relays - (National)
- Indoor competition - (Osaka Castle Hall, Osaka)
- 20 kilometres race walk -
- Cross-country race -

== Results ==
=== Men ===
- Complete results

Event	Gold		Silver		Bronze	
100 metres (wind: -0.2 m/s)	Ryūichirō Sakai; Osaka Gas	10.11 s	Hiroki Yanagita [[]]	10.13 s =SB	Yuki Koike [[]]	10.18 s
200 metres (wind: -0.2 m/s)	Towa Uzawa [[]]	20.32 s PB	Shoto Uno [[]]	20.55 s	Soshi Mizukubo [[]]	20.66 s
400 metres	Yuki Joseph Nakajima [[]]	45.15 s PB	Fuga Sato [[]]	45.26 s PB	Kentaro Sato [[]]	45.47 s
800 metres	Sho Kawamoto [[]]	1:46.18 min SB	Junya Matsumoto [[]]	1:46.52 min	Hinata Maeda [[]]	1:47.54 min
1500 metres	Kazuki Kawamura [[]]	3:38.45 min SB	Yusuke Takahashi [[]]	3:38.69 min	Keisuke Morita [[]]	3:38.71 min
5000 metres	Kazuya Shiojiri [[]]	13:19.87 min SB	Hyuga Endo [[]]	13:20.84 min	Kanta Shimizu [[]]	13:21.08 min
110 m hurdles -0.9	Shunsuke Izumiya; Juntendo University	13.04 s NR	Shunya Takayama [[]]	13.30 s	Taiga Yokochi [[]]	13.51 s
400 m hurdles	Daiki Ogawa [[]]	49.52 s PB	Hiromu Yamauchi [[]]	49.78 s SB	Yusaku Kodama [[]]	49.83 s
3000 m s'chase	Ryuji Miura; Juntendo University	8:21.41 min	Seiya Sunada [[]]	8:26.36 min	Atsushi Shobu [[]]	8:28.16 min
35 km walk	Tomohiro Noda [[]]	2:23:13 NR	Satoshi Maruo [[]]	2:25:49	Masatora Kawano [[]]	2:26:51
High jump	Ryoichi Akamatsu; Japan Airlines	2.29 m PB	Naoto Hasegawa [[]]	2.25 m	Tomohiro Shinno [[]]	2.25 m
Pole vault	Tomoya Karasawa [[]]	5.41 m	Shingo Sawa [[]]	5.41 m	Takuma Ishikawa [[]]	5.31 m
Long jump	Shotaro Shiroyama [[]]	8.11 m (w) +2.1	Yuki Hashioka [[]]	8.06 m 1.1 SB	Daiki Oda [[]]	7.90 m 2.0
Triple jump	Hikaru Ikehata [[]]	16.35 m 0.8 =SB	Riku Ito [[]]	15.84 m -0.2	[[]] [[]]	15.67 m 0.5
Shot put	Hitoshi Okumura [[]]	18.42 m PB	Ryuji Iwasa [[]]	18.36 m	Daichi Morishita [[]]	18.24 m
Discus throw	Yuji Tsutsumi; Alsok Gunma	57.98 m	Masateru Yugami [[]]	56.78 m	Shinichi Yukinaga [[]]	54.71 m
Hammer throw	Shota Fukuda [[]]	71.79 m PB	Ryota Kashimura [[]]	71.64 m	Kohei Oda [[]]	70.29 m
Javelin throw	Genki Dean; Mizuno Corporation	82.65 m SB	Ryohei Arai [[]]	80.60 m	Yuta Sakiyama [[]]	78.88 m
Decathlon	Shun Taue [[]]	7,674 pts SB	Keisuke Ushiro [[]]	7,112 pts SB	[[]] [[]]	7 pts
