= College of Naka-nippon Aviation =

Vocational school in Gifu Prefecture, Japan

Coordinates: 35.4527°N 136.9329°E

- 中日本航空専門学校
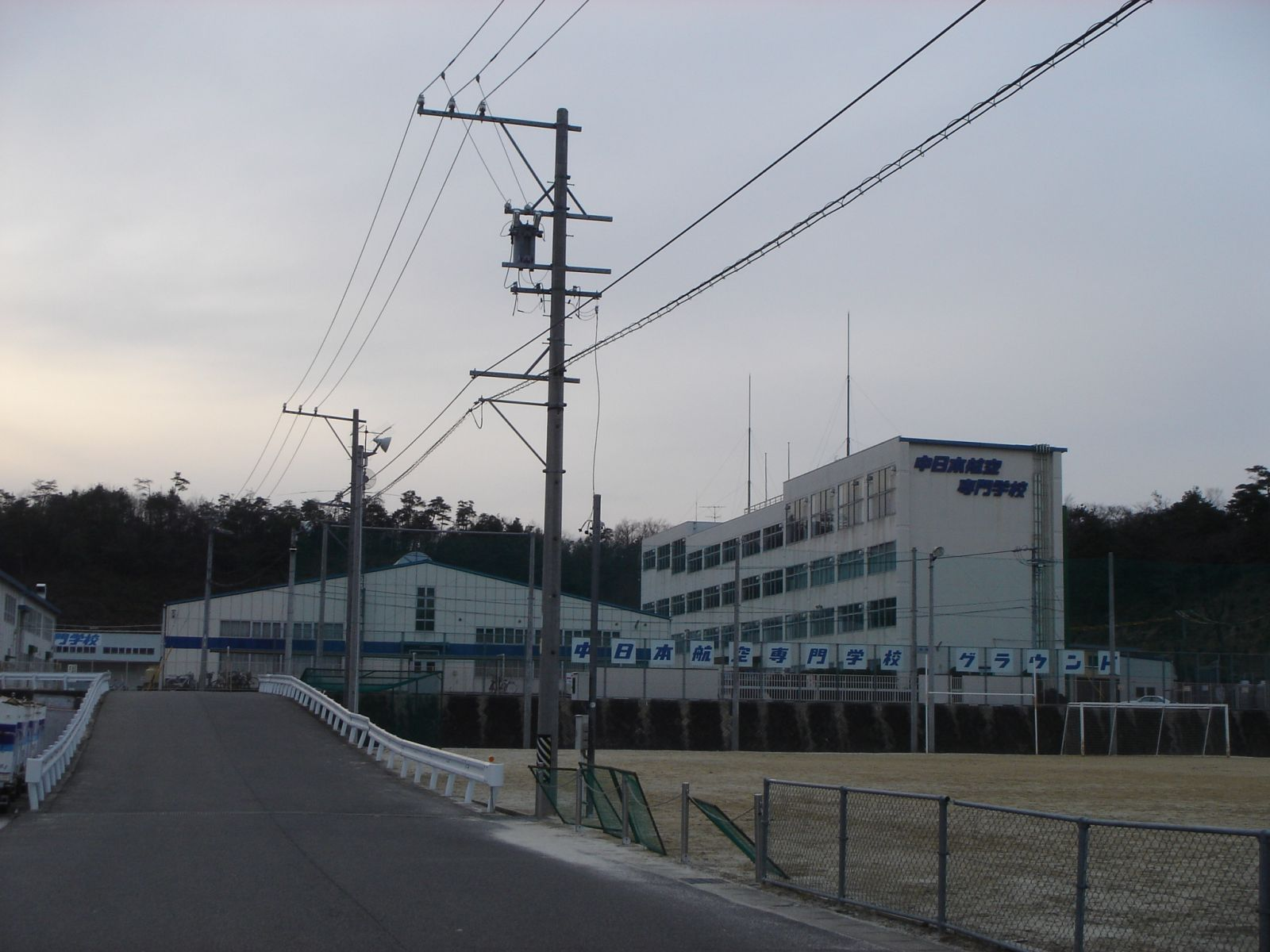
- College of Naka-nippon Aviation in 2008
- Type: Private
- Location: Seki, Gifu, Japan
- Website: http://www.cna.ac.jp/

College of Naka-nippon Aviation (中日本航空専門学校, Naka-nippon Koukū Senmon Gakkō) is a vocational school in Seki, Gifu Prefecture, Japan. It is one of the largest colleges in the aviation field in Japan. It is run by the education foundation, Jinno Institute (神野学園).

== History ==
It opened in 1970 in Konan and moved its campus to Seki in 1982.

== Departments ==
- Aviation Maintenance Engineering (three-year program)
- Aircraft Production Engineering (three-year program)
- Airport Service (two-year program)
