= Yang Chun-han =

Taiwanese athlete

Yang Chun-han 楊俊瀚
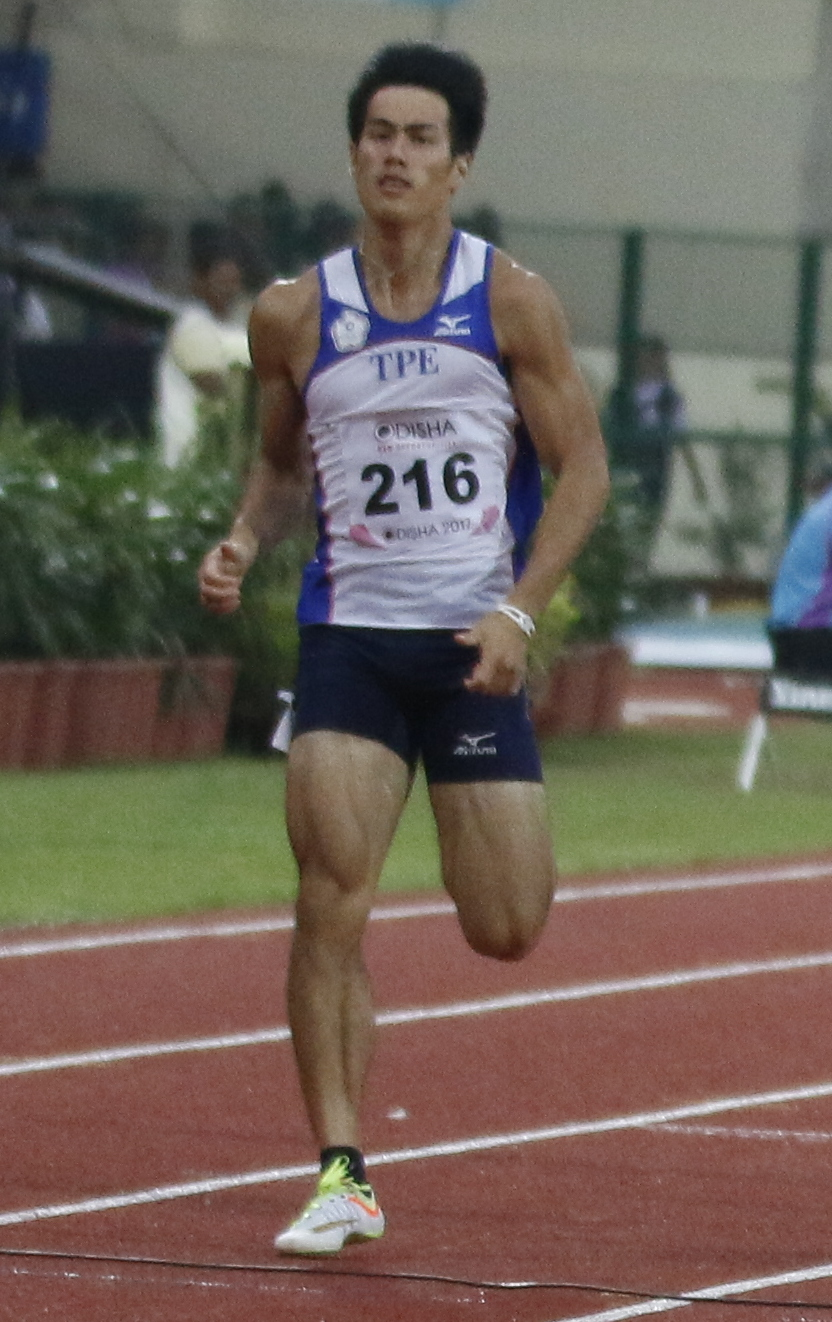
- Yang Chun-han in 2017

Personal information
- Nationality: Republic of China (Taiwan)
- Born: 1 January 1997 (age 29) Yuli, Hualien, Taiwan
- Education: National Taiwan Sport University
- Height: 1.76 m (5 ft 9 in)
- Weight: 65 kg (143 lb; 10 st 3 lb)

Sport
- Sport: Athletics
- Events: 100 m, 200 m
- Coached by: Liu Yuan-kai

Achievements and titles
- National finals: 2013 National Games; • 200 m, 2nd (silver); 2014 Taiwanese Champs; • 100 m, 1st (gold); 2015 National Games; • 100 m, 1st (gold); • 200 m, 1st (gold); 2016 Taiwanese Champs; • 100 m, 1st (gold); 2022 Taiwanese Champs; • 100 m, 1st (gold); • 200 m, 1st (gold)
- Personal bests: 100 m: 10.11（W：+0.2） NR; 200 m: 20.23（W：+0.7） NR
Medal record
Men's Athletics
Representing Chinese Taipei
Asian Games
Silver medal – second place	2018 Jakarta	200 m
Asian Championships
Gold medal – first place	2017 Bhubaneswar	200 m
Silver medal – second place	2019 Doha	4 × 100 m
Silver medal – second place	2023 Bangkok	200 m
Bronze medal – third place	2017 Bhubaneswar	100 m
Bronze medal – third place	2015 Wuhan	4 × 100 m
Summer Universiade
Gold medal – first place	2017 Taipei	100 m
Bronze medal – third place	2017 Taipei	4 × 100 m
Youth Olympic Games
Bronze medal – third place	2014 Nanjing	200 m
Asian Youth Games
Bronze medal – third place	2013 Nanjing	100 m

Yang Chun-han (Chinese: 楊俊瀚); born 1 January 1997, is a Taiwanese athlete of Amis descent specialising in sprinting events. He won two medals at the 2017 Asian Championships, gold in the 200 and bronze in the 100 metres. Yang won gold in the 100 metres at the 2017 Summer Universiade. He holds the national records in both the 100 and 200 metres.

== International competitions ==
Year	Competition	Venue	Position	Event	Notes
Representing Chinese Taipei
2013	World Youth Championships	Donetsk, Ukraine	46th (h)	100 m	11.17
2013	Asian Youth Games	Nanjing, China	3rd	100 m	10.73
2013	Asian Youth Games	Nanjing, China	1st	200 m	21.47
2014	Asian Junior Championships	Taipei, Taiwan	6th	100 m	10.73
2014	Asian Junior Championships	Taipei, Taiwan	5th	200 m	21.17
2014	Asian Junior Championships	Taipei, Taiwan	3rd	4 × 100 m	39.91
2014	Youth Olympic Games	Nanjing, China	3rd	200 m	21.31
2014	Asian Games	Incheon, South Korea	11th (sf)	200 m	21.64
2014	Asian Games	Incheon, South Korea	5th	4 × 100 m	39.20
2015	Universiade	Gwangju, South Korea	–	100 m	DQ
2015	Universiade	Gwangju, South Korea	15th (sf)	200 m	21.37
2015	Universiade	Gwangju, South Korea	–	4 × 100 m	DNF
2015	Asian Championships	Wuhan, China	11th (sf)	100 m	10.48
2015	Asian Championships	Wuhan, China	5th	200 m	20.96
2015	Asian Championships	Wuhan, China	3rd	4 × 100 m	39.35
2016	Asian Junior Championships	Ho Chi Minh City, Vietnam	1st	200 m	20.73
2016	Asian Junior Championships	Ho Chi Minh City, Vietnam	1st	4 × 100 m	39.75
2016	World U20 Championships	Bydgoszcz, Poland	5th	200 m	20.81
2016	World U20 Championships	Bydgoszcz, Poland	11th (h)	4 × 100 m	40.33
2017	Asian Championships	Bhubaneswar, India	3rd	100 m	10.31
2017	Asian Championships	Bhubaneswar, India	1st	200 m	20.66
2017	Asian Championships	Bhubaneswar, India	7th	4 × 100 m	40.23
2017	Universiade	Taipei, Taiwan	1st	100 m	10.22
2017	Universiade	Taipei, Taiwan	7th	200 m	21.07
2017	Universiade	Taipei, Taiwan	3rd	4 × 100 m	39.06
2018	Asian Games	Jakarta, Indonesia	5th	100 m	10.17
2018	Asian Games	Jakarta, Indonesia	2nd	200 m	20.23
2018	Asian Games	Jakarta, Indonesia	4th	4 × 100 m	38.98
2019	Asian Championships	Doha, Qatar	5th	100 m	10.28
2019	Asian Championships	Doha, Qatar	2nd	4 × 100 m relay	39.18
2019	World Relays	Yokohama, Japan	15th (h)	4 × 100 m relay	38.89
2019	Universiade	Naples, Italy	21st (sf)	200 m	23.37
2019	World Championships	Doha, Qatar	38th (h)	200 m	20.80
2021	Olympic Games	Tokyo, Japan	31st (h)	100 m	10.21
2023	Asian Championships	Bangkok, Thailand	8th	100 m	10.31
2023	Asian Championships	Bangkok, Thailand	2nd	200 m	20.48
2023	Asian Championships	Bangkok, Thailand	8th	4 × 100 m relay	48.96
2023	World Championships	Budapest, Hungary	35th (h)	200 m	20.82
2023	Asian Games	Hangzhou, China	12th (sf)	100 m	10.23
2023	Asian Games	Hangzhou, China	3rd	200 m	20.74
2023	Asian Games	Hangzhou, China	6th	4 × 100 m relay	39.28
2024	Olympic Games	Paris, France	14th (rep)	200 m	20.73

== Personal bests ==
- 100 metres – 10.11 (W：+0.2 m/s, Hiratsuka 2018) NR
- 200 metres – 20.23 (W：+0.7 m/s, Jakarta 2018) NR
