= Jinno Institute =

Educational foundation

The Jinno Institute (学校法人神野学園, Gakkō Hōjin Jinno Gakuen) is an educational foundation in Aichi that operates a university and two colleges in Gifu, Japan.

== Institutions ==
- Gifu University of Medical Science
- Nakanihon Automotive College
- College of Naka-nippon Aviation
