= Fahhad Al-Subaie =

Saudi athlete (born 1994)

Fahhad Mohammed Al-Subaie (Arabic: فهاد محمد السبيعي; born 4 February 1994) is a Saudi athlete who specialises in the 200 metres. He won silver medals at the 2013 Asian Championships and 2014 Asian Games.

He has personal bests of 10.37 in the 100 metres (2013) and 20.74 seconds in the 200 metres (2013).

== Competition record ==
Year	Competition	Venue	Position	Event	Notes
Representing Saudi Arabia
2011	World Youth Championships	Lille, France	35th (h)	200 m	22.19
2013	Arab Championships	Doha, Qatar	2nd	200 m	20.55
2013	Asian Championships	Pune, India	5th	100 m	10.48
2013	Asian Championships	Pune, India	2nd	200 m	20.91
2013	Asian Championships	Pune, India	1st	4 × 400 m relay	3:02.53
2013	Islamic Solidarity Games	Palembang, Indonesia	3rd	100 m	10.37
2013	Islamic Solidarity Games	Palembang, Indonesia	1st	200 m	20.74
2013	Islamic Solidarity Games	Palembang, Indonesia	2nd	4 × 100 m relay	40.20
2014	Asian Games	Incheon, South Korea	2nd	200 m	20.74
2015	Asian Championships	Wuhan, China	2nd	200 m	20.63
2017	Asian Indoor and Martial Arts Games	Ashgabat, Turkmenistan	–	60 m	DQ
2019	Arab Championships	Cairo, Egypt	3rd	200 m	20.84
2019	Arab Championships	Cairo, Egypt	1st	4 × 100 m relay	39.79
2019	Asian Championships	Doha, Qatar	5th (sf)	200 m	20.76^{1}
2019	Asian Championships	Doha, Qatar	4th	4 × 100 m relay	39.52
2019	World Championships	Doha, Qatar	26th (h)	200 m	20.51
2022	GCC Games	Kuwait City, Kuwait	2nd	100 m	20.92
2022	GCC Games	Kuwait City, Kuwait	1st	4 × 100 m relay	39.06
2022	Islamic Solidarity Games	Konya, Turkey	–	200 m	DNF
2022	Islamic Solidarity Games	Konya, Turkey	5th	4 × 100 m relay	39.32
2023	Arab Championships	Marrakesh, Morocco	3rd	200 m	20.71
2023	Arab Championships	Marrakesh, Morocco	1st	4 × 100 m relay	39.08
2023	Asian Championships	Bangkok, Thailand	7th	200 m	21.10
2023	Asian Championships	Bangkok, Thailand	4th	4 × 100 m relay	39.12

^{1}Did not start in the final
