= Towa Uzawa =

Japanese sprinter (born 2002)

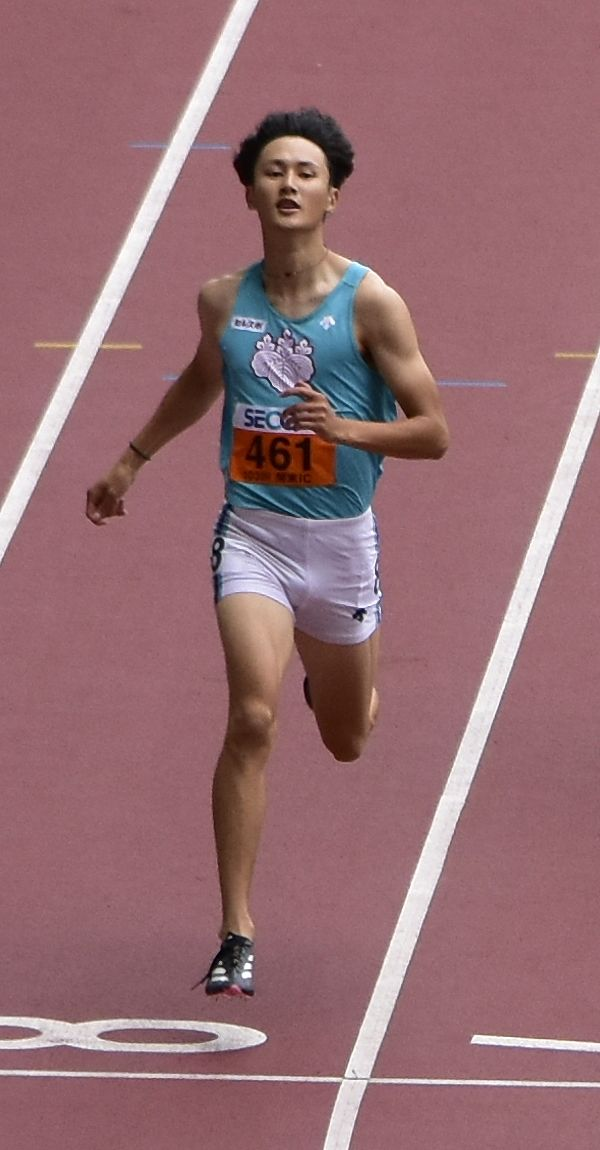
- Uzawa in 2024

Personal information
- Nationality: Japanese
- Born: 25 November 2002 (age 23)

Sport
- Sport: Athletics
- Event: 200 meters

Achievements and titles
- Personal bests: 100 m: 10.30 (Sagamihara 2021); 200 m: 20.11 (Fukui 2025); 300 m: 32.45 (Utsunomiya 2022)
Medal record
Men's athletics
Representing Japan
Asian Championships
Gold medal – first place	2025 Gumi	200 m
Gold medal – first place	2023 Bangkok	200 meters

Towa Uzawa (鵜澤 飛羽, Uzawa Towa; born 25 November 2002) is a Japanese sprinter who specializes in the 200 meters.

In 2023, he won the 200 meters at both the Asian and Japanese Championships. He also competed in the World Championships, where he reached the semi finals.

In 2024, he qualified for the 200 meters at the 2024 Summer Olympics based on his world ranking.
