= Felix Diu =

Hong Kong sprinter (born 2000)

Felix Diu Chun Hei (born 3 April 2000) is a sprinter who competed in the men's 100 metres for Hong Kong at the 2024 Summer Olympics. He qualified via a Universality Place, in which athletes from underrepresented countries receive placement. Diu was eliminated in the preliminary rounds after placing fourth in his heat. At the Olympics, Diu briefly became a viral Internet meme in Hong Kong due to his surname being a homophone of a Cantonese profanity.
