= Chen Jiapeng =

Chinese sprinter (born 2002)

Personal information
- Born: July 5, 2002 (age 23) Siping, Jilin, China
- Education: Central China Normal University
- Height: 175 cm (5 ft 9 in)

Sport
- Country: China
- Sport: Track and field
- Event(s): 60 m, 100 m, 200 m, 4×100 m relay, 4×200 m relay

Achievements and titles
- Personal bests: 60 m: 6.87 (2019); 100 m: 10.17 (2023); 200 m: 21.17 (2022)
Medal record
Men's athletics
Representing China
Asian Games
| Gold medal – first place | 2022 Hangzhou | 4×100 m relay |
Asian Championships
| Silver medal – second place | 2023 Bangkok | 4×100 m relay |
Summer World University Games
| Gold medal – first place | 2021 Chengdu | 4×100 m relay |
Asian Youth Championships
| Bronze medal – third place | 2019 Hong Kong | 100 m |

Chen Jiapeng (Chinese: 陈佳鹏; pinyin: Chénjiāpéng; born July 5, 2002) is a Chinese sprinter.

== Background ==
Chen was born in Siping, Jilin, China.

His first international competition was at the 2019 Asian Youth Athletics Championships where he obtained a bronze metal in the 100-meter event. His time was 10.66 seconds.

He currently studies at Central China Normal University.
