= Abdullah Abkar Mohammed =

Saudi sprinter (born 1997)

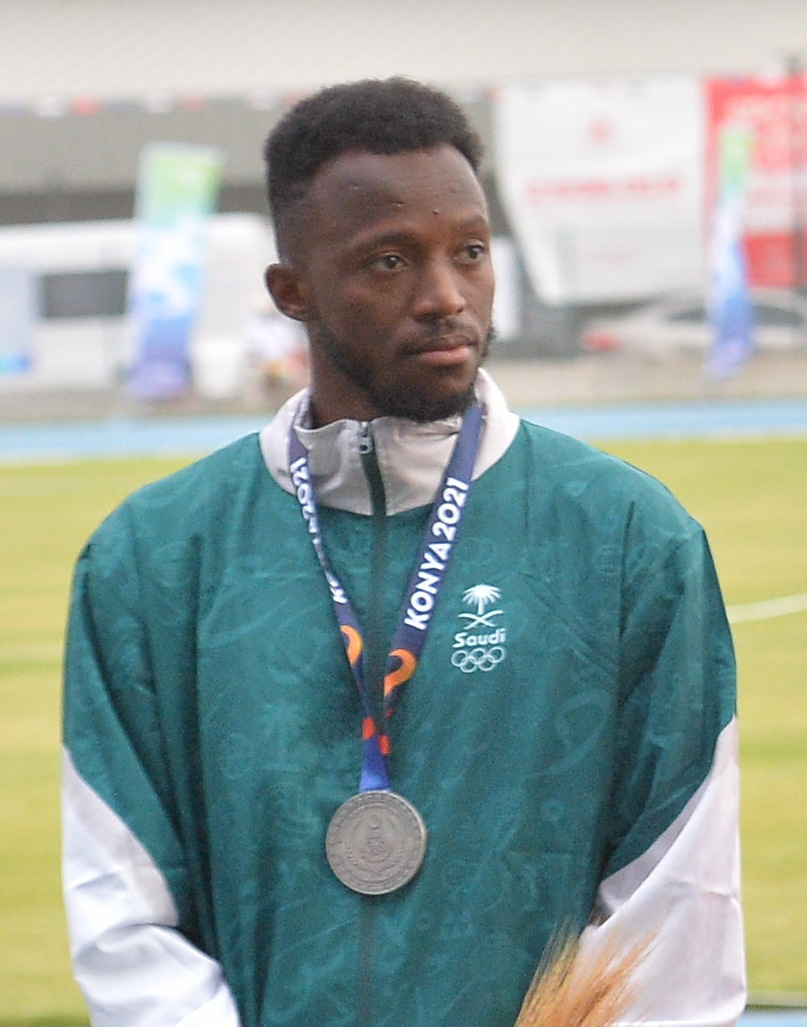

Personal information
- Born: 1 January 1997 (age 29) Medina, Saudi Arabia
- Height: 1.72 m (5 ft 7 1/2 in)
- Weight: 73 kg (161 lb)

Sport
- Country: Saudi Arabia
- Sport: Athletics
- Events: 60 m, 100 m, 200 m
Medal record
Men's athletics
Representing Saudi Arabia
Asian Championships
Silver medal – second place	2023 Bangkok	100 m
Bronze medal – third place	2025 Gumi	100 m

Abdullah Abkar Mohammed (Arabic: عبد الله أبكر محمد, born 1 January 1997) is a Saudi sprinter competing in the 100 metres. He represented Saudi Arabia in the 100 metres at the 2016 Olympics. At the 5th Islamic Solidarity Games at Konya, Turkey, Mohammed ran a time of 9.95 seconds, but the time is invalid due to a technical failure on the cabling of the starting system, and thus cannot be ratified as new National Record.

== Competition record ==
Year	Competition	Venue	Position	Event	Notes
Representing Saudi Arabia
2016	World Indoor Championships	Portland, United States	18th (sf)	60 m	6.68
2016	Asian Junior Championships	Ho Chi Minh City, Vietnam	3rd	100 m	10.45
2016	Asian Junior Championships	Ho Chi Minh City, Vietnam	7th (h)	200 m	21.71^{1}
2016	Olympic Games	Rio de Janeiro, Brazil	34th (h)	100 m	10.26
2017	World Championships	London, United Kingdom	32nd (h)	100 m	10.31
2017	Asian Indoor and Martial Arts Games	Ashgabat, Turkmenistan	2nd (sf)	60 m	6.67^{2}
2017	Asian Indoor and Martial Arts Games	Ashgabat, Turkmenistan	–	4 × 400 m relay	DQ
2018	World Indoor Championships	Birmingham, United Kingdom	12th (sf)	60 m	6.63
2018	Asian Games	Jakarta, Indonesia	4th	100 m	10.10
2021	Arab Championships	Radès, Tunisia	2nd	100 m	10.48
2021	Arab Championships	Radès, Tunisia	1st	4 × 100 m relay	39.69
2022	GCC Games	Kuwait City, Kuwait	2nd	100 m	10.21 (w)
2022	GCC Games	Kuwait City, Kuwait	1st	4 × 100 m relay	39.06
2022	Islamic Solidarity Games	Konya, Turkey	2nd	100 m	~~9.95~~ IRM
2022	Islamic Solidarity Games	Konya, Turkey	5th	4 × 100 m relay	39.32
2023	West Asian Championships	Doha, Qatar	2nd	100 m	10.23
2023	West Asian Championships	Doha, Qatar	2nd	4 × 100 m relay	39.86
2023	Arab Championships	Marrakesh, Morocco	2nd	100 m	10.29
2023	Arab Championships	Marrakesh, Morocco	1st	4 × 100 m relay	39.08
2023	Asian Championships	Bangkok, Thailand	2nd	100 m	10.19
2023	Asian Championships	Bangkok, Thailand	4th	4 × 100 m relay	39.12
2023	Asian Games	Hangzhou, China	9th (sf)	100 m	10.21
2023	Asian Games	Hangzhou, China	2nd	200 m	20.63
2025	Asian Championships	Gumi, South Korea	3rd	100 m	10.30

^{1}Did not start in the semifinals
^{2}Disqualified in the final

== Personal bests ==
Outdoor

- 100 metres – 10.03 (+1.2 m/s), Stade Charléty, Paris (FRA) on 30 June 2018
- 200 metres – 20.50 (+1.9 m/s), Riyadh (KSA) on 7 November 2022

Indoor

- 60 metres – 6.60, New York City (USA), at the Millrose Games on 3 February 2018
