= Gifu University of Medical Science =

Higher education institution in Gifu Prefecture, Japan

- 岐阜医療科学大学
- Other names: GUMS
- Type: Private
- Established: 1973
- Students: 1192
- Location: 795-1 Aza-Nagamine, Ichihiraga, Seki, Gifu, Japan; 35°29′28.7″N 136°57′6.1″E
- Campus: Suburban
- Website: www.u-gifu-ms.ac.jp

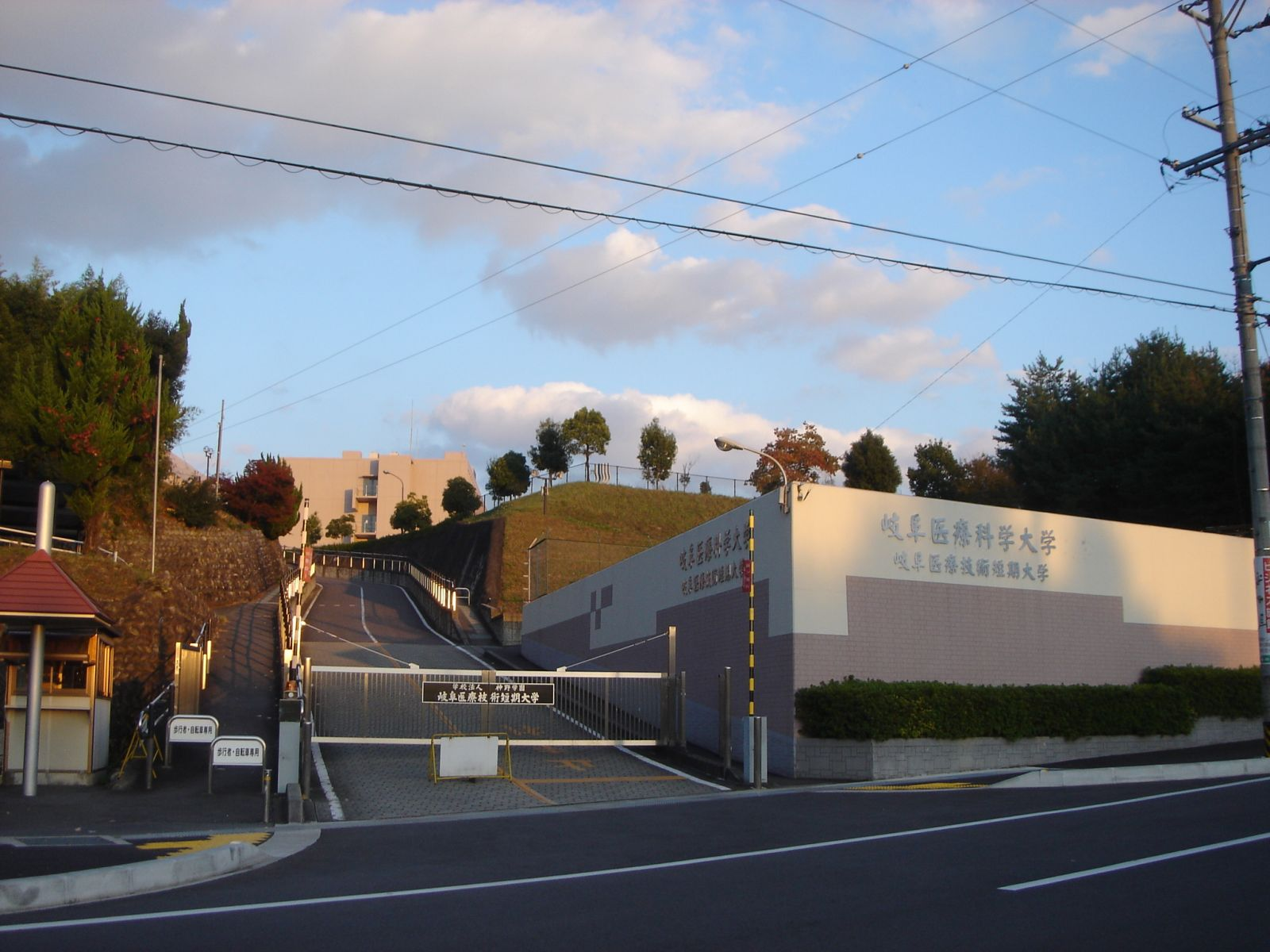
Gifu University of Medical Science

Gifu University of Medical Science (岐阜医療科学大学, Gifu Iryō Kagaku Daigaku) is a private university in Seki, Gifu, Japan. It is run by an educational foundation, Jinno Institute (神野学園).

== History ==
It started in 1973 as a vocational school, Kokusai Igaku Sougou Gijutsu Gakuin (国際医学総合技術学院), which became a junior college in 1983, Gifu College of Medical Technology (岐阜医療技術短期大学). It was awarded full university status in 2006. The graduate school opened in 2016.

== Faculties and graduate school ==
=== Undergraduate ===
- School of Health Sciences
  - Faculty of Medical Technology
  - Faculty of Radiological Technology
  - Faculty of Nursing

=== Postgraduate ===
- Faculty of Midwifery (Diploma)
- Graduate School of Health and Medicine (MSc)
