= Hiroki Yanagita =

Japanese athlete (born 2003)

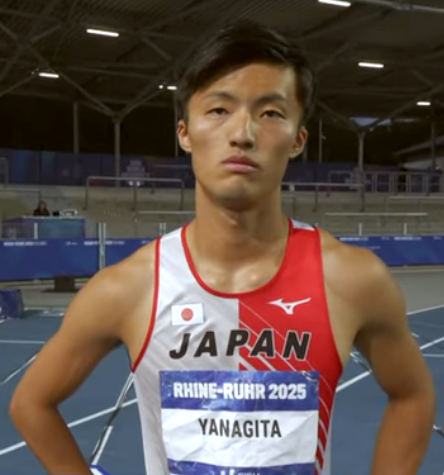
- At the 2025 Summer World University Games

Personal information
- Nationality: Japanese
- Born: 25 July 2003 (age 22)

Sport
- Sport: Athletics
- Event: Sprint

Achievements and titles
- Personal best(s): 100m: 10.00 (Fukui, 2025)
Medal record
Men's athletics
Representing Japan
Asian Championships
Gold medal – first place	2023 Bangkok	100 m
Gold medal – first place	2025 Gumi	100 m
Summer World University Games
Bronze medal – third place	2025 Bochum	100 m
World Relays
Silver medal – second place	2021 Chorzów	4×100m relay
World U20 Championships
Gold medal – first place	2022 Cali	4x100m relay

Hiroki Yanagita (栁田 大輝, born 25 July 2003) is a Japanese sprinter. He won the 2023 and 2025 Asian Athletics Championships over 100 metres.

== Biography ==
He ran the anchor leg for the Japanese 4 × 100 m relay team that finished runner-up at the World Athletics Relays in Chorzów in 2021. He was also part of the Japanese relay team that competed at the 2021 World Athletics Championships in Eugene, United States.

He was a member of the Japanese 4 × 100 m relay team that won gold at the World Athletics U20 Championships in Cali, Colombia in August 2022. He also finished sixth in the individual 100m at the championships in a time of 10.24 seconds.

In July 2023, he won gold in the 100 metres at the Asian Championships in Bangkok, running a personal best time of 10.02 seconds.

He reached the semi-finals of the individual 100m and was a member of the Japanese 4 × 100 m relay team that finished fifth in the final at the 2023 World Athletics Championships in Budapest.

He ran as part of the Japanese 4 × 100 m relay team which qualified for the 2024 Paris Olympics at the 2024 World Relays Championships in Nassau, Bahamas. He competed in the men's 4 x 100 metres relay at the 2024 Paris Olympics.

In May 2025, he won the 100 metres at the Golden Grand Prix in Tokyo in 10.06 seconds to finish ahead of Americans Christian Miller and Christian Coleman. That month, he won the gold medal in the 100 metres at the 2025 Asian Athletics Championships. In July 2025, he won the bronze medal at the 2025 Summer World University Games in Germany, in the 100 metres. In August, he lowered his 100m personal best to 10.00 seconds at the Athlete Night Games in Fukui.

In September 2025, he competed in the men's 4 x 100 metres at the 2025 World Championships in Tokyo, Japan, as the Japanese team placed sixth.

In May, he ran at the 2026 World Athletics Relays in the men's 4 × 100 metres relay in Gaborone, Botswana.

== Personal life ==
He studied International Literature at Toyo University, where he was coached by Hiroyasu Tsuchie.
