= Ngần Ngọc Nghĩa =

Vietnamese sprinter

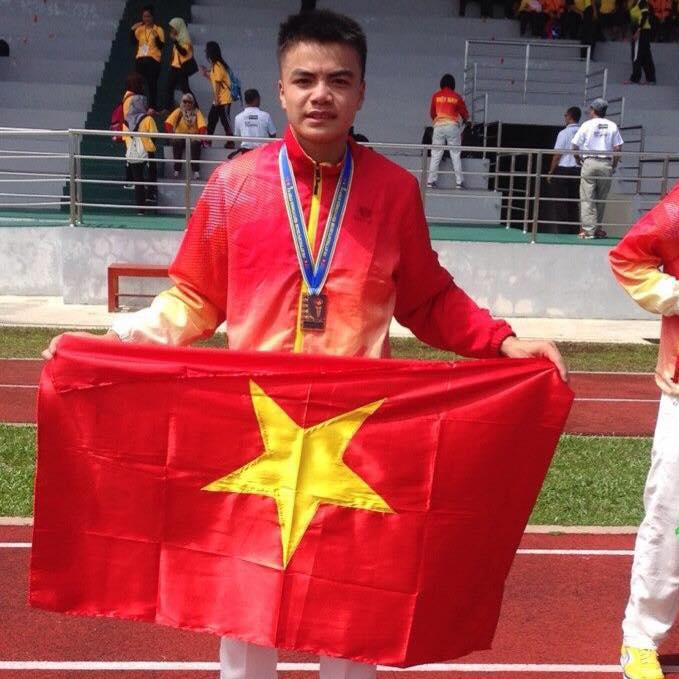
- Ngan Ngoc Nghia

Personal information
- Nationality: Vietnamese
- Born: 20 July 1999 (age 27)

Sport
- Sport: Athletics
- Event: Sprinting
Medal record
Men's athletics
Representing Vietnam
Southeast Asian Games
Silver medal – second place	2021 Hanoi	200 m
Silver medal – second place	2023 Cambodia	200 m

Medal record

Professional athletics athlete

Representing Vietnam
Gold medal – first place	2017 Vietnam	Men's 4×100m
Gold medal – first place	2018 Vietnam	Men's 200m
Gold medal – first place	2019 Vietnam	Men's 4×100m
Gold medal – first place	2020 Vietnam	Men's 100m
Gold medal – first place	SEA Games 31	Men's 100m
Gold medal – first place	SEA Games 31	Men's 4×100m

Ngần Ngọc Nghĩa (born 20 July 1999) is a Vietnamese athlete. He competed in the men's 100 metres event at the 2019 World Athletics Championships.

== Biography ==
Ngần Ngọc Nghĩa was born in 1999 into a farming family in Hua Păng Commune, Mộc Châu District, Sơn La Province.

In 2014, coaches from the People's Public Security selected athletes at the Sơn La student athletics competition. Ngần Ngọc Nghĩa, then 15 years old, was invited by the coaches to Hanoi for training.

He took up athletics in 2015.

In the second half of 2015, Nghĩa suffered a fairly serious hamstring injury. He had to stop training or train only lightly for about six to seven months, but Ngần Ngọc Nghĩa overcame the injury.

== Career ==
=== 2016 ===
At the 2016 National Athletics Championships, Ngần Ngọc Nghĩa won the gold medal in the men's 4×100 m relay for the People's Public Security team.

=== 2017 ===
At the 2017 National Athletics Championships, Nghĩa won his first gold medal in the men's 4×100 m relay.

=== 2018 ===
At the 2018 National Games, Ngần Ngọc Nghĩa recorded a time of 21.29 seconds to win the gold medal, followed by Lương Văn Thao in second place, Nguyễn Văn Châu in third, and Lê Trọng Hinh in fourth.

=== 2019 ===
Another record was set in the men's 4×100 m relay final. The People's Public Security team, consisting of four athletes—Võ Ngọc Huy, Hoàng Mạnh Cường, Lãnh Văn Cương, and Ngần Ngọc Nghĩa—set a new national record of 40.44 seconds, surpassing the previous record set by Army athletes at the 2012 National Championships. The team won the gold medal at the 2019 National Athletics Championships.

=== 2020 ===
In the men's 100 m final, Ngần Ngọc Nghĩa competed against seven opponents, including former national champion Lê Trọng Hinh of Thanh Hóa, who was making his return. Ngọc Nghĩa crossed the finish line first in 10.40 seconds. Not only did he successfully defend his gold medal, but he also broke the national record of 10.47 seconds that he had set two years earlier at the 2020 National Athletics Championships, held at the Mỹ Đình National Stadium.

=== 2022 ===
In the men's 200 m qualifying round in May 2022 at Mỹ Đình National Stadium, Ngần Ngọc Nghĩa finished first in the final heat with a time of 20.81 seconds. After carefully reviewing the wind conditions and other factors, the technical committee confirmed that his performance was recognized as a new national record. The previous national record was 20.89 seconds, set by former national team member Lê Trọng Hinh when he won the gold medal at the SEA Games 28 in Singapore seven years earlier.

Ngần Ngọc Nghĩa won the gold medal at the SEA Games 31 and also broke the national record with a time of 10.35 seconds, surpassing his own previous record of 10.40 seconds, as well as the Games record of 10.47 seconds.

On 16 February 2022, Ngần Ngọc Nghĩa suffered an injury immediately after attempting to cross the finish line and win the gold medal in the men's 4×100 m relay at the SEA Games 31. The People's Public Security men's relay team, consisting of Lê Trung Kiên, Đặng Hoàng Ánh, Lãnh Văn Cương, and Ngần Ngọc Nghĩa, finished first with a time of 40.83 seconds.
