= Kim Kuk-young =

South Korean sprinter (born 1991)

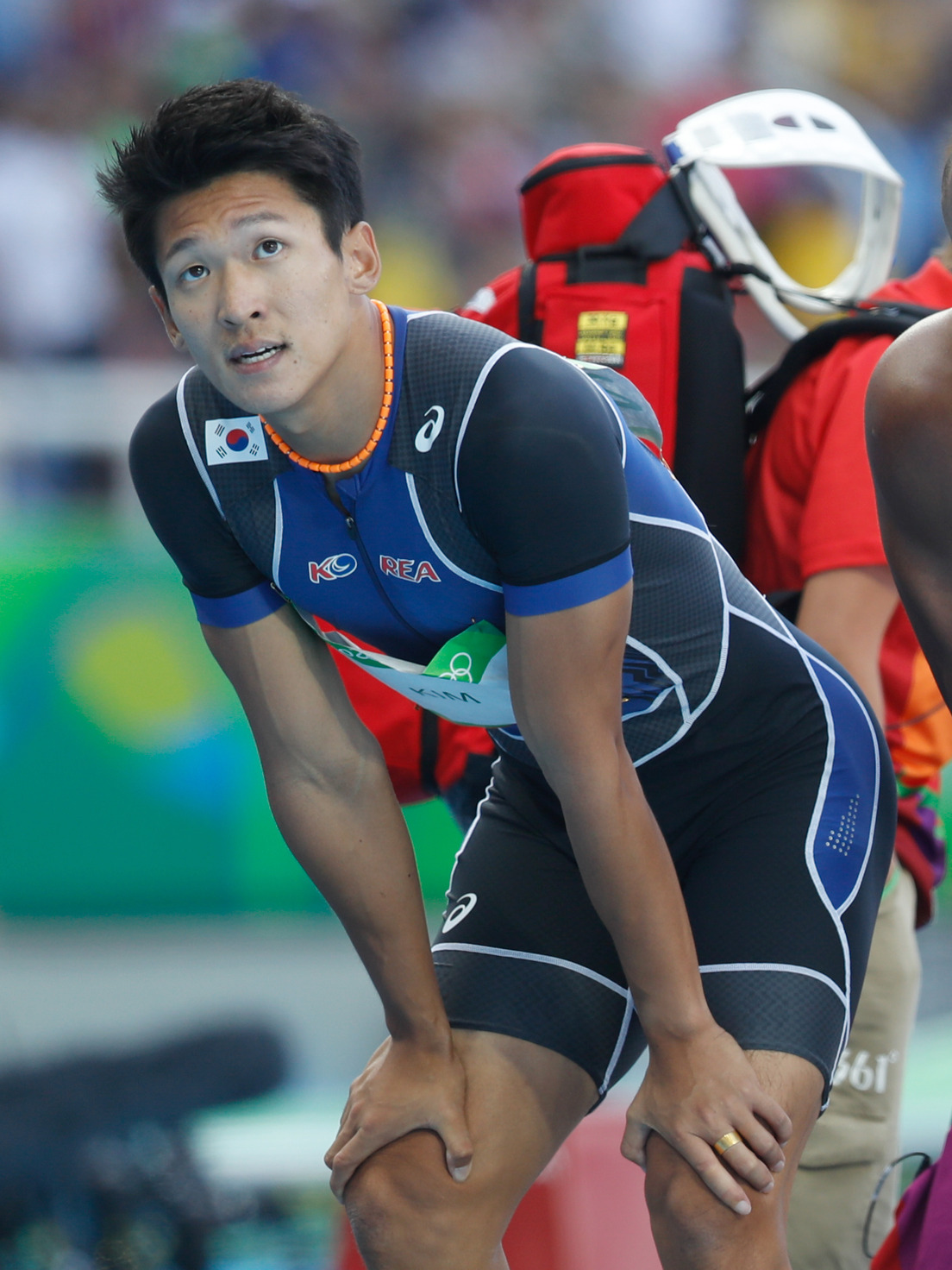
- Kim at the 2016 Olympics

Personal information
- Native name: 김국영
- Nationality: South Korean
- Born: 19 April 1991 (age 35) Anyang, Gyeonggi
- Education: Pyeongchon Management High School, Chosun University
- Height: 175 cm (5 ft 9 in)
- Weight: 73 kg (161 lb)
- Website: Cyworld

Sport
- Country: South Korea
- Sport: Track and field
- Team: Gwangju Metropolitan City Hall
Medal record
Men's athletics
Representing South Korea
Asian Games
Bronze medal – third place	2022 Hangzhou	4×100 m relay

Korean name
- Hangul: 김국영
- Hanja: 金國榮
- RR: Gim Gukyeong
- MR: Kim Kugyŏng

Kim Kuk-young (Korean pronunciation: [kim.ɡu.ɡjʌŋ] or [kim] [ku.ɡjʌŋ]; born 19 April 1991) is a South Korean track and field sprinter who competes in the 100 metres. He set a national record in the men's 100-meter sprint at the 2015 Summer Universiade. His personal best, and the current Korean men's 100m national record, is 10.07 set in Jeongseon on 27 June 2017.

He retired in 2025 and then he became coach of South Korea women National athletics team.
