= Ryuichiro Sakai =

Japanese sprinter

Personal information
- Nationality: Japanese
- Born: 14 March 1998 (age 28) Toyonaka, Osaka Prefecture, Japan

Sport
- Sport: Athletics
- Event: 100 meters

Achievements and titles
- Personal bests: 60 m: 6.62i (Tampere & Belgrade 2023); 100 m: 10.02 (Tottori 2022); 200 m: 21.34 (Osaka 2019)

Ryuichiro Sakai (坂井 隆一郎, Sakai Ryūichirō; born 14 March 1998) is a Japanese sprinter who specializes in the 100 meters.

In 2023, he won the 100 meters at the Japanese Championships. He also competed in the same event at the 2022 and 2023 World Championships, reaching the semi finals in 2022.

In 2024, he qualified for the 100 meters at the 2024 Summer Olympics based on his world ranking.
