= Chen Wen-pu =

Taiwanese sprinter (born 1998)

Personal information
- Born: 25 December 1998 (age 27)

Sport
- Sport: Athletics
- Event: Sprint

Achievements and titles
- Personal bests: 60 m: 6.60 (2026) NR; 100 m: 10.26 (2025); 200 m: 20.69 (2023)
Medal record
Mmen's athletics
Representing Chinese Taipei
Asian Indoor Championships
Silver medal – second place	2026 Tanjijn	60 m

Chen Wen-pu (born 25 December 1998) is a Taiwanese sprinter. He was a silver medalist in the 60 metres at the 2026 Asian Indoor Athletics Championships, running a national record time.

== Biography ==
In 2023, he competed at the 2023 Asian Athletics Championships in Bangkok, Thailand, placing eighth in the final with the men's 4 × 100 metres relay team. That year, he was also selected to represent the Chinese Taipei delegation for the delayed 2022 Asian Games in Hangzhou, China, where he was part of the 4 × 100 metres relay team which qualified for the final and placed sixth overall. However, he suffered an Achilles tendon injury at the Asian Games and was only able to compete professionally again after a year of physical therapy.

In October 2025, he ran a wind-assisted 9.95 seconds (+2.7 m/s) for the 100 metres at the National Games. In February 2026, was a silver medalist in the 60 metres at the 2026 Asian Indoor Athletics Championships in Tianjin, China, running 6.60 seconds in the final, a new national record to finish 0.01 behind Chinese sprinter Deng Xinrui. The previous national record of 6.68 seconds that he surpassed had been set by Cheng Hsin-fu in 1988. He had also previously set a personal best of 6.61 seconds in the semi-final. In March 2026, he was selected for the 2026 World Athletics Indoor Championships in Toruń, Poland in the men's 60 metres.
