= Ko Seung-hwan =

South Korean sprinter

Personal information
- Born: 14 November 1997 (age 28)

Sport
- Sport: Athletics
- Event: Sprint

Achievements and titles
- Personal bests: 100m: 10.42 (Gimhae, 2025); 200m: 20.45 (Jeongseon, 2025)
Medal record
Men's athletics
Representing South Korea
Asian Games
Bronze medal – third place	2022 Hangzhou	4×100 m relay
Asian Championships
Bronze medal – third place	2023 Bangkok	4×100 m relay

Ko Seung-hwan (born 14 November 1997) is a South Korean sprinter. He is a multiple-time national champion over 200 metres.

== Career ==
Competing at the 2019 Summer Universiade in Naples, he won a bronze medal in the 4 x 100 metres relay alongside Lee Kyu-hyung, Mo Il-hwan and Park Si-young.

He won a bronze medal in the 4 x 100 metres relay at the 2023 Asian Athletics Championships in Bangkok. He was then a bronze medalist with the South Korean men’s 4 x 100 metres team at the delayed 2022 Asian Games held in Hangzhou, China in October 2023. It was the first time a South Korean team had won a medal in the event at the Games since 1986.

He was a finalist and placed sixth overall in the 200 metres for the South Korean team at the 2025 Asian Athletics Championships in Gumi, South Korea. He competed at the 2025 World Athletics Relays in China in the Men's 4 × 100 metres relay in May 2025.

He set a new personal best of 20.45 seconds for the 200 metres whilst competing in Jeongseon in June 2025, improving on his previous best of 20.49 seconds set the year before, and moved him to within 0.05 seconds of the South Korean national record. In September 2025, he competed in the 200 metres at the 2025 World Championships in Tokyo, Japan.
