= Marc Brian Louis =

Singaporean sprinter

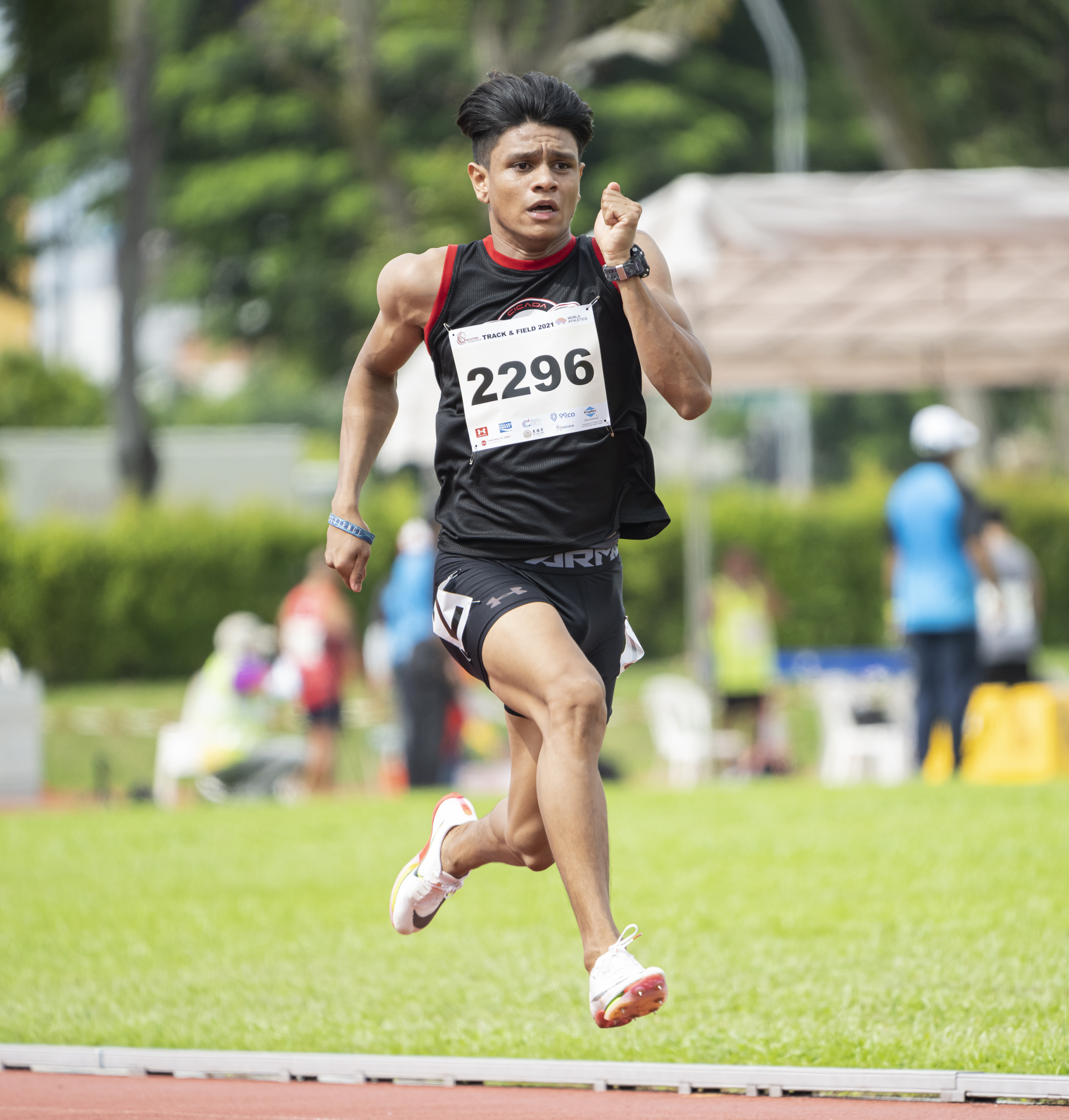
- Louis competing in 2021

Personal information
- Born: 7 August 2002 (age 24) Singapore
- Height: 174 cm (5 ft 9 in)
- Weight: 67 kg (148 lb)

Sport
- Country: Singapore
- Sport: Athletics
- Events: 100 m, 100 m hurdles, 200 m, 400 m hurdles, 4 x 100 m

Achievements and titles
- Personal bests: 100 m: 10.27s (NR); 200 m: 20.72s (NR)
Medal record
Men's athletics
Representing Singapore
Southeast Asian Games
Silver medal – second place	2023 Cambodia	100 m
Silver medal – second place	2025 Thailand	200 m
Bronze medal – third place	2021 Vietnam	100 m
Bronze medal – third place	2021 Vietnam	4 x 100 m relay
Bronze medal – third place	2023 Cambodia	4 x 100 m relay
Asian Youth Championships
Gold medal – first place	2019 Hong Kong	400 m hurdles
Bronze medal – third place	2019 Hong Kong	110 m hurdles
Southeast Asian Youth Championships
Gold medal – first place	2019 Ilagan	400 m hurdles
Silver medal – second place	2019 Ilagan	110 m hurdles

Marc Brian Louis (born 7 August 2002) is a Singaporean athlete specialising in sprints and hurdles. He is the current national record holder for the 60 m (6.68s), 100 m (10.27s), and 200 m (20.89s).

== Early life and education ==
Louis' father, Gilbert, first realised that Louis had running potential when he took the then eight-year-old Louis to a run at Sembawang Park. Louis dabbled in football and swimming growing up, but eventually gravitated towards track and field. He started competing for Sembawang Primary School, and subsequently, Anderson Secondary School. While he won medals at the national championships in primary school, it was only in 2017 that he won his first gold, at the 110m hurdles. He successfully defended his title the following year, adding a gold in the 400 m hurdles as well. Louis was temporarily enrolled in the Singapore Sports School, but left after a year. He later graduated from the Institute of Technical Education.

== Sporting career ==
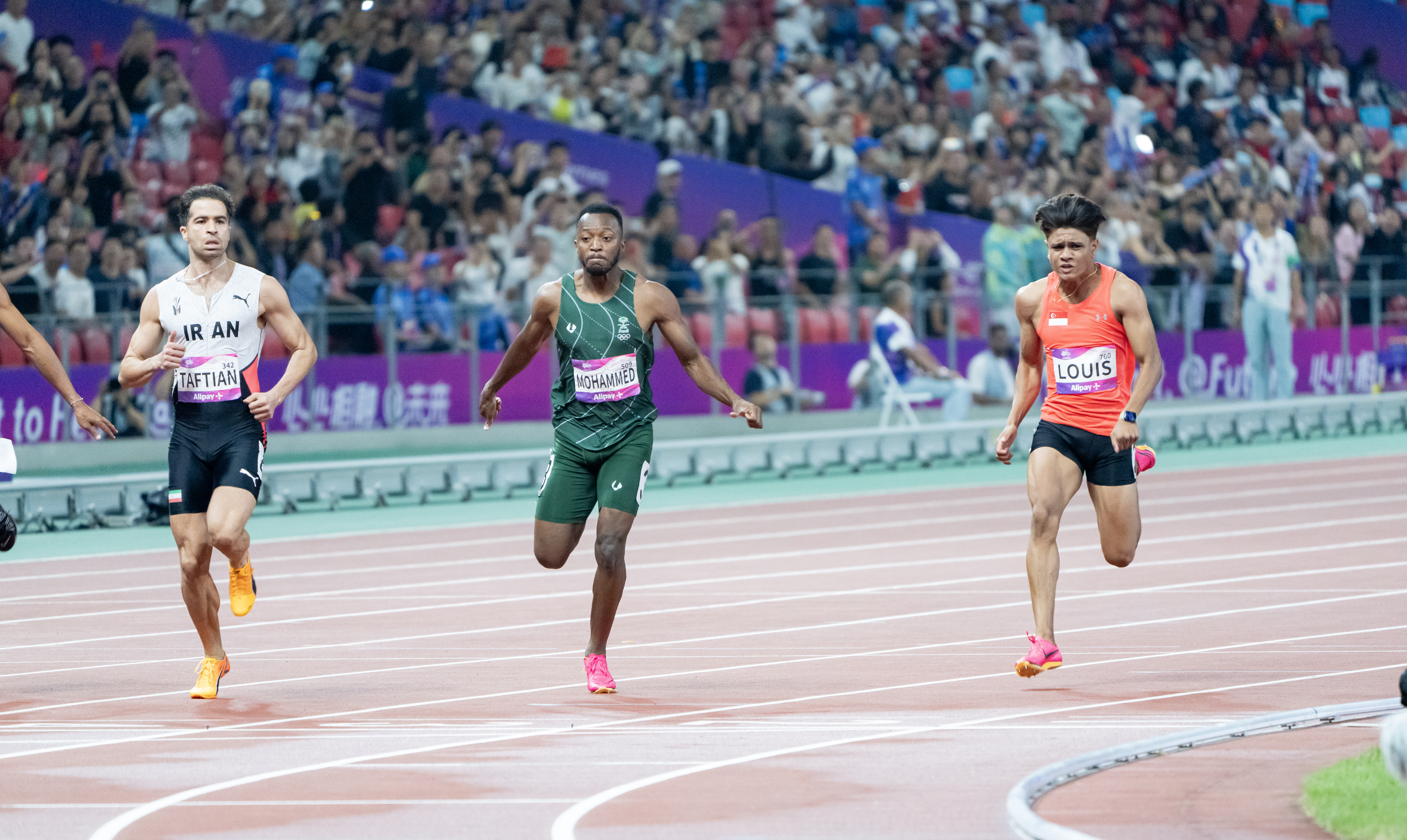
Louis (right) at the 2022 Asian Games, where he broke the national record for the 100 m

In 2019, Louis became the first Singaporean to win gold in the 400 m hurdles (55.09s) at the 2019 Asian Youth Athletics Championships held in Hong Kong. In the same tournament, he clocked 13.74s in the 110 m hurdles to set a new national U-18 record. Earlier in the year, Louis had won the 400 m hurdles and came in second in the 110m hurdles at the 2019 Southeast Asian Youth Athletics Championships.

In 2021, while competing at the World Athletics U-20 Championships in Nairobi, Louis set a new national U-20 record for the 110 m hurdles with a time of 13.77s; he finished 11th overall. In the same year, he broke the national U-20 record for the 100 m with a time of 10.39s – 0.02s off the men's record. Because of his performances, he was granted deferment from National Service. This paid off at the 2021 Southeast Asian Games, where he won a bronze in the 100m and was also part of the men's quartet that won a bronze in the 4x100m relay — Singapore's first relay medal at the competition in seven years.

At the 2023 Southeast Asian Games in Phnom Penh, Louis won another bronze in the 4 x 100 m relay and a silver in the 100 m, matching his personal best of 10.39s in the latter. At the 2022 Asian Games in Hangzhou, China, Louis finished 6th in his 100 m semi-final and 13th overall. However, he broke the 22-year national record set by UK Shyam in 2001 (10.37s) with a time of 10.27s. At the 2024 World Athletics Indoor Championships, he broke another national record, this time at the 60m (6.69s).

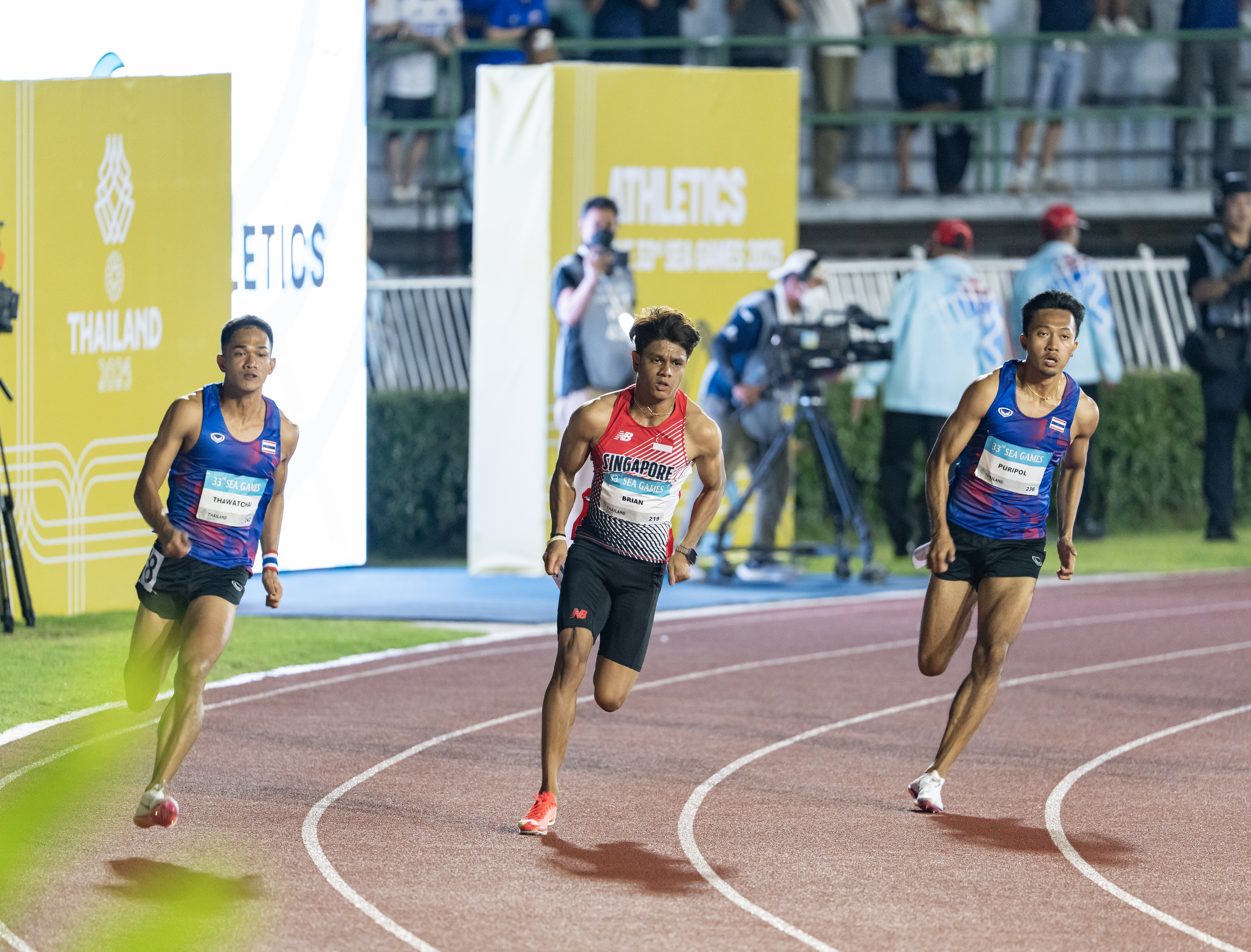
Louis at the 2025 Southeast Asian Games, where he rewrote his 200 m record

On 11 August 2025, Louis broke Reuben Rainer Lee's 200 m record of 21.07s with a time of 20.89s at the Sano Sprint Meet in Japan, becoming the first Singaporean to clock a sub-21 for the event. He lowered this time to 20.72s during the final of the 2025 Southeast Asian Games in Thailand. In the 100 m, he finished fourth (10.32s).

=== Personal bests ===
- 60 m – 6.68s (2026 World Athletics Indoor Championships)
- 100 m – 10.27s (+2.0 m/s, Hangzhou 2022)
- 200 m – 20.72s (Bangkok 2025)

== See also ==
- Sport in Singapore
- Sport Singapore
- List of Singapore World Champions in Sports
