= Mark Lee (runner) =

Singaporean sprinter (born 2004)

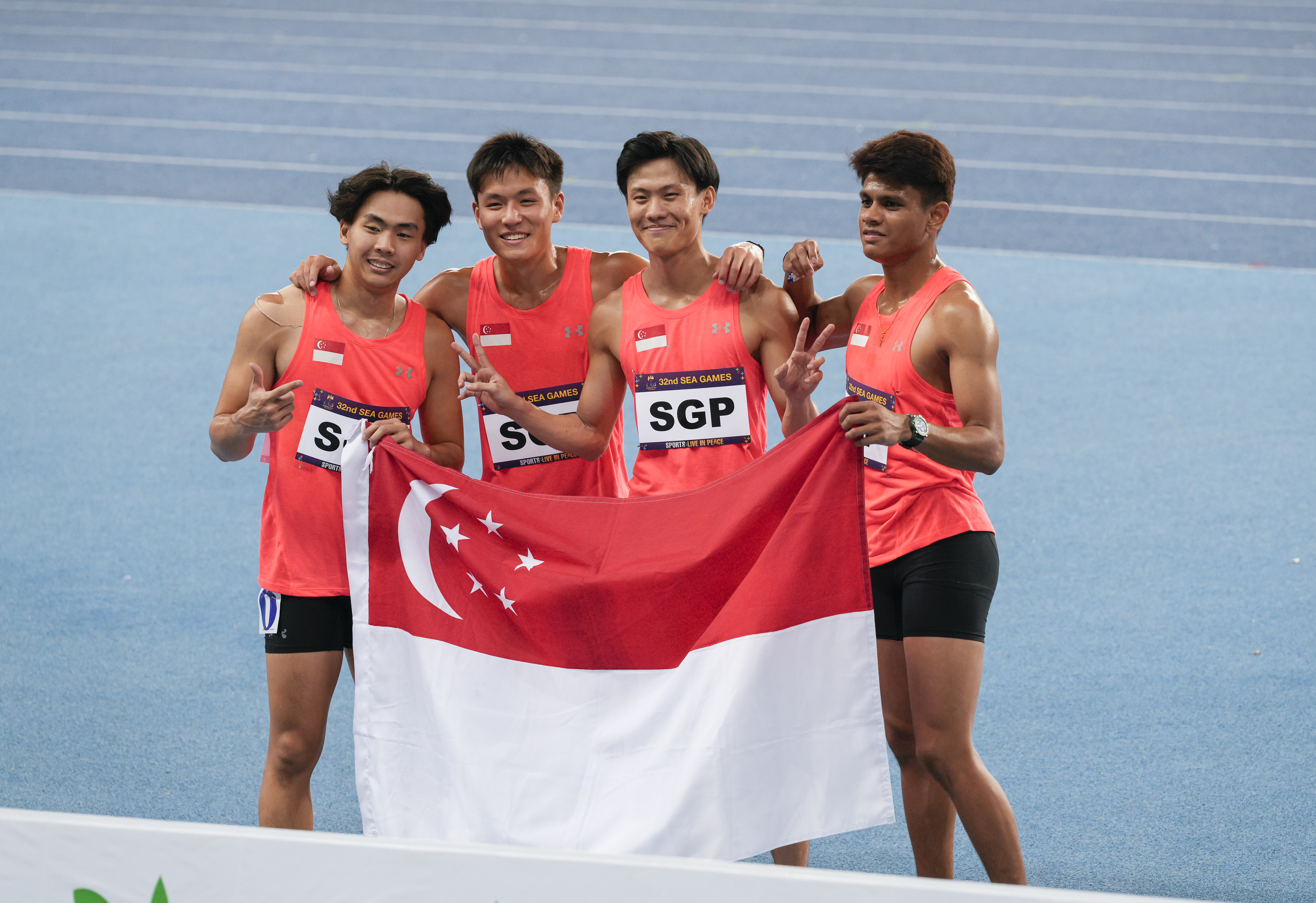
- Lee (second from left) with his 4 × 100 m teammates after their bronze performance at the 2023 SEA Games

Personal information
- Born: 17 April 2004 (age 22) Singapore

Sport
- Country: Singapore
- Sport: Athletics
- Events: 100 metres, 200 metres, 4 x 100 metres relay
Medal record
Men's Athletics
Representing Singapore
Southeast Asian Games
Bronze medal – third place	2023 Cambodia	4 x 100 metres relay

Mark Lee Ren (born 17 April 2004) is a Singaporean athlete who specialises in the 100m and 200m sprints. As a student at Anglo-Chinese School (Independent)—and coached by former Singapore sprinter Hamkah Afik—he broke the 100m and 200m national schools records in 2022 with timings of 10.59s and 21.62s respectively.

At the 2023 SEA Games in Phnom Penh, he qualified for the final, eventually finishing fifth with a time of 21.48s. In the 4 x 100 metres relay, he was part of the quartet that earned a bronze.

== See also ==
- Sport in Singapore
- Sport Singapore
- List of Singapore World Champions in Sports
