= Khairul Hafiz Jantan =

Malaysian sprinter (born 1998)

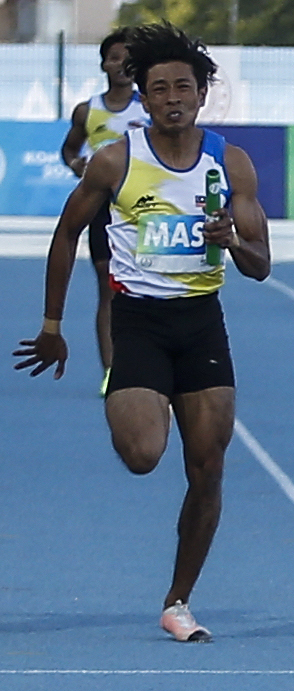
- Khairul Hafiz Jantan in 2022

Personal information
- Full name: Khairul Hafiz bin Jantan
- Nicknames: The Flying Youth; The Flying Jantan
- Born: 22 July 1998 (age 28) Merlimau, Malaysia
- Height: 1.73 m (5 ft 8 in)
- Weight: 58 kg (128 lb)

Sport
- Sport: Track and field
- Event: Sprinting

Achievements and titles
- Personal bests: 100 m: 10.18 s NR, NJR (Kuching 2016); 200 m: 20.90 s NJR (Kuala Lumpur 2017)
Medal record
Men's athletics
Representing Malaysia
Southeast Asian Games
Gold medal – first place	2017 Kuala Lumpur	100 m
Silver medal – second place	2019 Philippines	4×100 m relay
Bronze medal – third place	2023 Cambodia	4×100 m relay
Asian Junior Athletics Championships
Gold medal – first place	2016 Ho Chi Minh City	100 m
Silver medal – second place	2016 Ho Chi Minh City	200 m
Silver medal – second place	2016 Ho Chi Minh City	4×100 m relay
ASEAN School Games
Gold medal – first place	2015 Bandar Seri Begawan	4×100 m relay
Silver medal – second place	2015 Bandar Seri Begawan	200 m
Silver medal – second place	2015 Bandar Seri Begawan	4×400 m relay

Khairul Hafiz bin Jantan (born 22 July 1998) is a Malaysian sprinter, competing in events ranging from 100 metres to 400 metres. He was the former Malaysian 100 metres outdoor record holder with a time of 10.18 seconds. Khairul Hafiz, representing home state Malacca, had broken the record set by Watson Nyambek (10.38 set in 1998) during the Malaysia Games in Kuching in 2016. His personal best of 20.90 seconds in the 200 metres was the Malaysian national junior record.
