= 2009 Asian Athletics Championships – Men's 200 metres =

The men's 200 metres event at the 2009 Asian Athletics Championships was held at the Guangdong Olympic Stadium on November 12–13.

== Medalists ==
Gold	Silver	Bronze
Omar Jouma Al-Salfa; United Arab Emirates	Shinji Takahira; Japan	Hitoshi Saito; Japan

== Results ==
=== Heats ===
Wind: Heat 1: +1.9 m/s, Heat 2: +0.9 m/s, Heat 3: +0.9 m/s, Heat 4: +0.9 m/s

Rank	Heat	Name	Nationality	Time	Notes
1	1	Omar Jouma Al-Salfa	United Arab Emirates	21.03	Q
2	1	Hamed Hamdan Al-Bishi	Saudi Arabia	21.16	Q
2	2	Vyacheslav Muravyev	Kazakhstan	21.16	Q
4	2	Suppachai Chimdee	Thailand	21.21	Q
5	4	Shinji Takahira	Japan	21.23	Q
6	4	Barakat Al-Harthi	Oman	21.33	Q
7	1	Yeo Hosu-ah	South Korea	21.34	Q
7	2	Lahmediu Al-Marjabi	Oman	21.34	Q
9	4	Adel Jaber Mahbub	Saudi Arabia	21.43	Q
10	3	Hitoshi Saito	Japan	21.48	Q
11	4	Leung Ki Ho	Hong Kong	21.50	q
12	4	Shehan Ambepitiya	Sri Lanka	21.51	q
13	3	Sivadasan Arunjith	India	21.54	Q
13	2	Wang Chengliang	China	21.54	q
15	2	Jeon Deok-hyung	South Korea	21.58	q
16	1	Tang Yik Chun	Hong Kong	21.60	
17	4	Sittichai Suwonprateep	Thailand	21.71	
18	1	Pan Po-yu	Chinese Taipei	21.73	
19	2	Apip Dwi Cahyono	Indonesia	21.97	
20	3	Liu Yung	Chinese Taipei	22.05	Q
21	3	Mohamad Noor Imrah A Hadi	Malaysia	22.19	
22	1	Riski Latip	Indonesia	22.54	
22	4	Battulgyn Achitbileg	Mongolia	22.54	PB
24	3	Liang Jiahong	China	22.79	
25	2	Tilak Ram Tharu	Nepal	23.39	F1
25	3	Kilakone Sophonexay	Laos	23.39	
	1	Weerasuriya Mudiyanselage	Sri Lanka	DNF	
	2	Femi Seun Ogunode	Qatar	DNS	
	3	Ao Chan Hong	Macau	DNS	

=== Semifinals ===
Wind: Heat 1: -0.1 m/s, Heat 2: +1.0 m/s

Rank	Heat	Name	Nationality	Time	Notes
1	1	Omar Jouma Al-Salfa	United Arab Emirates	21.07	Q
2	1	Hitoshi Saito	Japan	21.17	Q
3	2	Shinji Takahira	Japan	21.28	Q
4	1	Hamed Hamdan Al-Bishi	Saudi Arabia	21.29	Q
5	2	Yeo Hosu-ah	South Korea	21.36	Q
6	2	Suppachai Chimdee	Thailand	21.47	Q
7	2	Vyacheslav Muravyev	Kazakhstan	21.52	q
8	1	Leung Ki Ho	Hong Kong	21.54	q
9	2	Shehan Ambepitiya	Sri Lanka	21.57	
10	1	Jeon Deok-hyung	South Korea	21.60	F2
11	2	Wang Chengliang	China	21.61	
12	1	Sivadasan Arunjith	India	21.62	F1
13	1	Liu Yung	Chinese Taipei	21.94	
14	1	Lahmediu Al-Marjabi	Oman	22.03	
	2	Barakat Al-Harthi	Oman	DQ	F1, F2
	2	Adel Jaber Mahbub	Saudi Arabia	DNS	

=== Final ===
Wind: +0.6 m/s

Rank	Lane	Name	Nationality	Time	Notes
1st place, gold medalist(s)	4	Omar Jouma Al-Salfa	United Arab Emirates	21.07	
2nd place, silver medalist(s)	3	Shinji Takahira	Japan	21.08	
3rd place, bronze medalist(s)	6	Hitoshi Saito	Japan	21.10	
4	7	Hamed Hamdan Al-Bishi	Saudi Arabia	21.11	
5	5	Yeo Hosu-ah	South Korea	21.36	
6	2	Vyacheslav Muravyev	Kazakhstan	21.51	
7	1	Leung Ki Ho	Hong Kong	21.63	
8	8	Suppachai Chimdee	Thailand	22.67	
