= 2015 Asian Athletics Championships – Men's 100 metres =

The Men's 100 metres at the 2015 Asian Athletics Championships was held on the 3 and 4 of June.

== Medalists ==
Gold	Femi Seun Ogunode; Qatar
Silver	Zhang Peimeng; China
Bronze	Reza Ghasemi; Iran

== Records ==
2015 Asian Athletics Championships
World record	Usain Bolt (JAM)	9.58	Berlin, Germany	16 August 2009
Asian record	Femi Seun Ogunode (QAT)	9.93	Incheon, South Korea	28 September 2014
Championship record	Samuel Francis (QAT)	9.99	Amman, Jordan	26 July 2007

== Schedule ==
Date	Time	Round
3 June 2015	09:40	Round 1
3 June 2015	16:10	Semifinals
4 June 2015	16:35	Final

== Results ==
=== Round 1 ===
Qualification rule: The first four finishers in each heat (Q) plus the four fastest times of those who finished fourth or lower in their heat (q) qualified.

==== Heat 1 ====
Rank	Lane	Name	Nationality	Reaction	Result	Notes
1	6	Reza Ghasemi	Iran	0.162	10.46	Q
2	5	Barakat Al-Harthi	Oman	0.140	10.54	Q
3	7	Hassan Saaid	Maldives	0.150	10.68	Q
4	3	Himasha Eashan	Sri Lanka	0.138	10.73	Q
5	4	Yang Chun-han	Chinese Taipei	0.122	10.74	q
6	2	Subur Santoso	Indonesia	0.169	10.99	
7	5	Aasish Chaudhary	Nepal	0.124	11.26	
				Wind: −1.6 m/s		

==== Heat 2 ====
Rank	Lane	Name	Nationality	Reaction	Result	Notes
1	6	Xie Zhenye	China	0.170	10.42	Q
2	5	Francis Samuel Adelebari	Qatar	0.142	10.45	Q
3	7	Kazuma Oseto	Japan	0.154	10.62	Q
4	3	Harith Ammar Sobri	Malaysia	0.163	10.79	Q
5	4	Davron Atabaev	Tajikistan	0.171	10.90	q
6	2	Hussain Haleem	Maldives	0.189	11.01	
7	5	Nguyen Ngoc An	Vietnam	0.170	11.15	
				Wind: −1.0 m/s		

==== Heat 3 ====
Rank	Lane	Name	Nationality	Reaction	Result	Notes
1	6	Femi Seun Ogunode	Qatar	0.171	10.12	Q
2	5	Yang Yang	China	0.140	10.53	Q
3	7	Kim Woo-sam	South Korea	0.134	10.71	Q
4	3	Khalid Al-Ghailani	Oman	0.127	10.73	Q
5	4	Li Lut Yin	Hong Kong	0.139	10.92	q
6	2	Saiyfon Luangsulin	Laos	0.183	11.56	
7	5	Pen Sokong	Cambodia	0.192	11.66	
				Wind: −0.7 m/s		

==== Heat 4 ====
Rank	Lane	Name	Nationality	Reaction	Result	Notes
1	6	Meshaal Al-Mutairi	Kuwait	0.123	10.50	Q
2	5	Kim Kuk-young	South Korea	0.129	10.60	Q
3	7	Yuki Koike	Japan	0.165	10.70	Q
4	3	Shen Yu-Sen	Chinese Taipei	0.157	10.76	Q
5	4	Bandit Chuangchai	Thailand	0.146	10.86	q
6	2	Noureddine Hadid	Lebanon	0.174	10.95	
7	5	Ganboldyn Shijirbaatar	Mongolia	0.128	11.14	
				Wind: −0.3 m/s		

==== Heat 5 ====
Rank	Lane	Name	Nationality	Reaction	Result	Notes
1	6	Zhang Peimeng	China	0.158	10.39	Q
2	5	Liaqat Ali	Pakistan	0.136	10.53	Q
3	7	Yasir Al-Nashri	Saudi Arabia	0.139	10.77	Q
4	3	Battulgyn Achitbileg	Mongolia	0.162	10.90	Q
5	4	Khairyll Amir Bin Tumadi	Singapore	0.160	10.93	
6	2	Masbah Ahmmed	Bangladesh	0.316	11.19	
				Wind: −0.9 m/s		

==== Round 1 result ====
Rank	Heat	Name	Nationality	Time	Notes
1	3	Femi Seun Ogunode	Qatar	10.12	Q
2	5	Zhang Peimeng	China	10.39	Q
3	2	Xie Zhenye	China	10.42	Q
4	2	Francis Samuel Adelebari	Qatar	10.45	Q
5	1	Reza Ghasemi	Iran	10.46	Q
6	4	Meshaal Al-Mutairi	Kuwait	10.50	Q
7	3	Yang Yang	China	10.53	Q
8	5	Liaqat Ali	Pakistan	10.53	Q
9	1	Barakat Al-Harthi	Oman	10.54	Q
10	4	Kim Kuk-young	South Korea	10.60	Q
11	2	Kazuma Oseto	Japan	10.62	Q
12	1	Hassan Saaid	Maldives	10.68	Q
13	4	Yuki Koike	Japan	10.70	Q
14	3	Kim Woo-sam	South Korea	10.71	Q
15	3	Khalid Al-Ghailani	Oman	10.73	Q
16	1	Himasha Eashan	Sri Lanka	10.73	Q
17	1	Yang Chun-han	Chinese Taipei	10.74	q
18	4	Shen Yu-Sen	Chinese Taipei	10.76	Q
19	5	Yasir Al-Nashri	Saudi Arabia	10.77	Q
20	2	Harith Ammar Sobri	Malaysia	10.79	Q
21	4	Bandit Chuangchai	Thailand	10.86	q
22	5	Battulgyn Achitbileg	Mongolia	10.90	Q
23	2	Davron Atabaev	Tajikistan	10.90	q
24	3	Li Lut Yin	Hong Kong	10.92	q
25	5	Khairyll Amir Bin Tumadi	Singapore	10.93	
26	4	Noureddine Hadid	Lebanon	10.95	
27	1	Subur Santoso	Indonesia	10.99	
28	2	Hussain Haleem	Maldives	11.01	
29	4	Ganboldyn Shijirbaatar	Mongolia	11.14	
30	2	Nguyen Ngoc An	Vietnam	11.15	
31	5	Masbah Ahmmed	Bangladesh	11.19	
32	1	Aasish Chaudhary	Nepal	11.26	
33	3	Saiyfon Luangsulin	Laos	11.56	
34	3	Pen Sokong	Cambodia	11.66	

=== Semi-final ===
Qualification rule: First 2 in each heat(Q) and the next 2 fastest(q).

==== Heat 1 ====
Rank	Lane	Name	Nationality	Reaction	Result	Notes
1	7	Zhang Peimeng	China	0.153	10.29	Q
2	4	Meshaal Al-Mutairi	Kuwait	0.140	10.32	Q
3	6	Kazuma Oseto	Japan	0.178	10.45	
4	9	Himasha Eashan	Sri Lanka	0.151	10.52	
5	2	Battulgyn Achitbileg	Mongolia	0.180	10.65	NR
6	5	Liaqat Ali	Pakistan	0.181	10.66	
7	8	Kim Woo-sam	South Korea	0.125	10.67	
8	3	Davron Atabaev	Tajikistan	0.186	10.75	
				Wind: +0.8 m/s		

==== Heat 2 ====
Rank	Lane	Name	Nationality	Reaction	Result	Notes
1	7	Femi Seun Ogunode	Qatar	0.155	9.97	Q, CR
2	4	Francis Samuel Adelebari	Qatar	0.137	10.29	Q
3	6	Yang Yang	China	0.121	10.34	q
4	5	Hassan Saaid	Maldives	0.138	10.50	=NR
5	3	Harith Ammar Sobri	Malaysia	0.142	10.58	
6	9	Shen Yu-Sen	Chinese Taipei	0.158	10.66	
7	2	Li Lut Yin	Hong Kong	0.154	10.67	
	8	Yuki Koike	Japan	-	DNS	
				Wind: +1.1 m/s		

==== Heat 3 ====
Rank	Lane	Name	Nationality	Reaction	Result	Notes
1	6	Reza Ghasemi	Iran	0.144	10.28	Q
2	7	Xie Zhenye	China	0.165	10.33	Q
3	4	Barakat Al-Harthi	Oman	0.141	10.37	q
4	5	Kim Kuk-young	South Korea	0.128	10.47	
5	2	Yang Chun-han	Chinese Taipei	0.127	10.48	
6	8	Khalid Al-Ghailani	Oman	0.150	10.68	
7	3	Bandit Chuangchai	Thailand	0.292	10.69	
8	9	Yasir Al-Nashri	Saudi Arabia	0.142	13.88	
				Wind: −0.7 m/s		

==== Semi-finals result ====
Rank	Heat	Name	Nationality	Time	Notes
1	2	Femi Seun Ogunode	Qatar	9.97	Q, CR
2	3	Reza Ghasemi	Iran	10.28	Q
3	1	Zhang Peimeng	China	10.29	Q
4	2	Francis Samuel Adelebari	Qatar	10.29	Q
5	1	Meshaal Al-Mutairi	Kuwait	10.32	Q
6	3	Xie Zhenye	China	10.33	Q
7	2	Yang Yang	China	10.53	q
8	3	Barakat Al-Harthi	Oman	10.37	q
9	1	Kazuma Oseto	Japan	10.45	
10	3	Kim Kuk-young	South Korea	10.47	
11	3	Yang Chun-han	Chinese Taipei	10.48	
12	2	Hassan Saaid	Maldives	10.50	=NR
13	1	Himasha Waththakankanamge	Sri Lanka	10.52	
14	2	Harith Ammar Sobri	Malaysia	10.58	
15	1	Battulgyn Achitbileg	Mongolia	10.65	NR
16	2	Shen Yu-Sen	Chinese Taipei	10.66	
17	1	Liaqat Ali	Pakistan	10.66	
18	2	Li Lut Yin	Hong Kong	10.67	
19	1	Kim Woo-sam	South Korea	10.67	
20	3	Khalid Al-Ghailani	Oman	10.68	
21	3	Bandit Chuangchai	Thailand	10.69	
22	1	Davron Atabaev	Tajikistan	10.75	
23	3	Yasir Al-Nashri	Saudi Arabia	13.88	
	2	Yuki Koike	Japan	DNS	

=== Final ===
Rank	Lane	Name	Nationality	Reaction	Result	Notes
1st place, gold medalist(s)	6	Femi Seun Ogunode	Qatar	0.160	9.91	AR CR
2nd place, silver medalist(s)	5	Zhang Peimeng	China	0.141	10.15	
3rd place, bronze medalist(s)	4	Reza Ghasemi	Iran		10.19	
4	9	Xie Zhenye	China	0.167	10.25	
5	2	Yang Yang	China		10.27	
6	8	Meshaal Al-Mutairi	Kuwait	0.140	10.27	NR
7	3	Barakat Al-Harthi	Oman		10.29	
8	7	Francis Samuel Adelebari	Qatar	0.129	10.31	
				Wind: +1.8 m/s		
