= Track and field at the 2011 Military World Games – Men's 200 metres =

The men's 200 metres event at the 2011 Military World Games was held on 22 and 23 July at the Estádio Olímpico João Havelange.

== Records ==
Prior to this competition, the existing world and CISM record were as follows:

World Record	Usain Bolt (JAM)	19.19	Berlin, Germany	20 August 2009
CISM World Record	Alessandro Cavallaro (ITA)	20.56	Hyderabad, India	17 October 2007

== Schedule ==
Date	Time	Round
22 July 2011		Round 1
22 July 2011		Semifinals
23 July 2011	09:25	Final

== Medalists ==
Gold	Silver	Bronze
Femi Seun Ogunode; Qatar	Aziz Ouhadi; Morocco	Joel Tapia; Dominican Republic

== Results ==
=== Final ===
Wind: +1.2 m/s

Rank	Lane	Name	Nationality	Time	Notes
1st place, gold medalist(s)	5	Femi Seun Ogunode	Qatar	20.46	CR
2nd place, silver medalist(s)	3	Aziz Ouhadi	Morocco	20.62	
3rd place, bronze medalist(s)	4	Joel Tapia	Dominican Republic	20.88	
4	2	Nilson André	Brazil	20.91	
5	6	Omar Alsalfa	United Arab Emirates	20.92	
6	8	Ailson Feitosa	Brazil	21.26	
7	7	Kamil Masztak	Poland	21.32	
8	1	Roberto Donati	Italy	21.69	
