= 2008 World Junior Championships in Athletics – Men's 200 metres =

The men's 200 metres event at the 2008 World Junior Championships in Athletics was held in Bydgoszcz, Poland, at Zawisza Stadium on 10 and 11 July.

== Medalists ==
Gold	Christophe Lemaître; France
Silver	Nickel Ashmeade; Jamaica
Bronze	Robert Hering; Germany

== Results ==
=== Final ===
11 July
Wind: -0.9 m/s

Rank	Name	Nationality	Time	Notes
1st place, gold medalist(s)	Christophe Lemaître	France	20.83	
2nd place, silver medalist(s)	Nickel Ashmeade	Jamaica	20.84	
3rd place, bronze medalist(s)	Robert Hering	Germany	20.96	
4	Curtis Mitchell	United States	20.98	
5	Ramil Guliyev	Azerbaijan	21.00	
6	Antonio Sales	United States	21.01	
7	Omar Al-Salfa	United Arab Emirates	21.10	
	Adel Jaber Al-Asseri	Saudi Arabia	DQ	IAAF rule 32.2

=== Semifinals ===
10 July

==== Semifinal 1 ====
Wind: -0.9 m/s

Rank	Name	Nationality	Time	Notes
1	Nickel Ashmeade	Jamaica	20.83	Q
2	Ramil Guliyev	Azerbaijan	20.90	Q
3	Antonio Sales	United States	20.90	q
4	Omar Al-Salfa	United Arab Emirates	21.02	q
5	Alexander Nordkvist	Sweden	21.32	
6	Masanori Kaji	Japan	21.45	
7	Davide Manenti	Italy	21.67	
8	Liang Tse-Ching	Chinese Taipei	21.89	

==== Semifinal 2 ====
Wind: -0.3 m/s

Rank	Name	Nationality	Time	Notes
1	Curtis Mitchell	United States	20.74	Q
2	Christophe Lemaître	France	20.88	Q
3	David Lescay	Cuba	21.32	
4	Lukáš Štastný	Czech Republic	21.46	
5	Javier Sanz	Spain	21.53	
6	Shehan Abeypitiyage	Sri Lanka	21.60	
7	Likoúrgos-Stéfanos Tsákonas	Greece	21.83	
	Chris Clarke	United Kingdom	DNS	

==== Semifinal 3 ====
Wind: -0.1 m/s

Rank	Name	Nationality	Time	Notes
1	Robert Hering	Germany	21.06	Q
2	Diego Marani	Italy	21.23	
3	Seiya Hane	Japan	21.39	
4	Jovon Toppin	Trinidad and Tobago	21.45	
5	Pan Po-Yu	Chinese Taipei	21.55	
6	Richard Kilty	United Kingdom	21.56	
7	Ramone McKenzie	Jamaica	21.60	
	Adel Jaber Al-Asseri	Saudi Arabia	DQ	IAAF rule 32.2 Q

=== Heats ===
10 July

==== Heat 1 ====
Wind: +0.4 m/s

Rank	Name	Nationality	Time	Notes
1	Antonio Sales	United States	21.27	Q
2	Shehan Abeypitiyage	Sri Lanka	21.57	Q
3	Suppachai Chimdee	Thailand	21.74	
4	Kemar Hyman	Cayman Islands	21.81	
5	Endrik Zilberstein	Georgia	22.55	
	Tirafal Batsholelwang	Botswana	DQ	IAAF rule 163.3

==== Heat 2 ====
Wind: -0.7 m/s

Rank	Name	Nationality	Time	Notes
1	Diego Marani	Italy	21.18	Q
2	Richard Kilty	United Kingdom	21.27	Q
3	Ramone McKenzie	Jamaica	21.55	q
4	Alvaro Cassiani	Venezuela	21.85	
5	Roman Turcáni	Slovakia	22.13	
6	Pedro Suazo	Honduras	22.38	
7	Owen Camilleri	Malta	23.10	

==== Heat 3 ====
Wind: +0.9 m/s

Rank	Name	Nationality	Time	Notes
1	Christophe Lemaître	France	20.91	Q
2	Seiya Hane	Japan	21.42	q
3	Roy Schmidt	Germany	21.66	
4	Ahmed Al-Merjabi	Oman	21.81	
5	Michal Partyka	Poland	21.86	
6	Curtis Kock	Netherlands Antilles	22.01	
7	Tre Houston	Bermuda	22.10	
	Adel Jaber Al-Asseri	Saudi Arabia	DQ	IAAF rule 32.2 Q

==== Heat 4 ====
Wind: -1.1 m/s

Rank	Name	Nationality	Time	Notes
1	Javier Sanz	Spain	21.69	Q
2	Pan Po-Yu	Chinese Taipei	21.71	Q
3	Frédéric Mignot	France	21.74	
4	Filip Totos	Poland	21.79	
5	Patrick Vosloo	South Africa	21.93	
6	Philip Berntsen	Norway	21.99	
7	Zwade Edwards	Trinidad and Tobago	22.11	
8	Douglas Schmidt	Palau	24.01	

==== Heat 5 ====
Wind: -0.3 m/s

Rank	Name	Nationality	Time	Notes
1	Nickel Ashmeade	Jamaica	20.86	Q
2	David Lescay	Cuba	21.32	Q
3	Alexander Nordkvist	Sweden	21.38	q
4	Lukáš Štastný	Czech Republic	21.50	q
5	Bernhard Chudarek	Austria	21.76	
6	Mindaugas Baliukonis	Lithuania	21.83	
7	Emmanuel Appiah Kubi	Ghana	22.04	

==== Heat 6 ====
Wind: -0.2 m/s

Rank	Name	Nationality	Time	Notes
1	Masanori Kaji	Japan	21.34	Q
2	Omar Al-Salfa	United Arab Emirates	21.43	Q
3	Jovon Toppin	Trinidad and Tobago	21.56	q
4	Michael Robertson	Canada	21.64	
5	Su Wai'bou Sanneh	Gambia	22.01	
6	Matic Molicnik	Slovenia	22.37	
7	Thapelo Ketlogetswe	Botswana	22.65	

==== Heat 7 ====
Wind: -1.8 m/s

Rank	Name	Nationality	Time	Notes
1	Curtis Mitchell	United States	21.21	Q
2	Chris Clarke	United Kingdom	21.70	Q
3	Femi Owolade	Nigeria	21.80	
4	Shekeim Greaves	Barbados	21.81	
5	Martin Ricar	Czech Republic	21.93	
6	Maximus Fröjd	Sweden	22.06	
7	Tantawat Tongalam	Thailand	22.64	
8	René Heriniaina	Madagascar	23.16	

==== Heat 8 ====
Wind: +0.4 m/s

Rank	Name	Nationality	Time	Notes
1	Robert Hering	Germany	21.08	Q
2	Ramil Guliyev	Azerbaijan	21.33	Q
3	Davide Manenti	Italy	21.50	q
4	Likoúrgos-Stéfanos Tsákonas	Greece	21.56	q
5	Liang Tse-Ching	Chinese Taipei	21.60	q
6	Izzet Safer	Turkey	21.71	
7	Innocent Bologo	Burkina Faso	22.12	

== Participation ==
According to an unofficial count, 58 athletes from 44 countries participated in the event.

- Austria (1)
- Azerbaijan (1)
- Barbados (1)
- Bermuda (1)
- Botswana (2)
- Burkina Faso (1)
- Canada (1)
- Cayman Islands (1)
- Chinese Taipei (2)
- Cuba (1)
- Czech Republic (2)
- France (2)
- Gambia (1)
- Georgia (1)
- Germany (2)
- Ghana (1)
- Greece (1)
- Honduras (1)
- Italy (2)
- Jamaica (2)
- Japan (2)
- Lithuania (1)
- Madagascar (1)
- Malta (1)
- Netherlands Antilles (1)
- Nigeria (1)
- Norway (1)
- Oman (1)
- Palau (1)
- Poland (2)
- Saudi Arabia (1)
- Slovakia (1)
- Slovenia (1)
- South Africa (1)
- Spain (1)
- Sri Lanka (1)
- Sweden (2)
- Thailand (2)
- Trinidad and Tobago (2)
- Turkey (1)
- United Arab Emirates (1)
- United Kingdom (2)
- United States (2)
- Venezuela (1)
