= Athletics at the 2014 Asian Games – Men's 100 metres =

Men's 100 metres at the 2014 Asian Games
- Venue: Incheon Asiad Main Stadium
- Dates: 27–28 September 2014
- Competitors: 26 from 16 nations

Medalists
gold medal	Femi Ogunode	Qatar
silver medal	Su Bingtian	China
bronze medal	Kei Takase	Japan

The men's 100 metres event at the 2014 Asian Games was held at the Incheon Asiad Main Stadium, Incheon, South Korea on 27–28 September.

== Schedule ==
All times are Korea Standard Time (UTC+09:00)

Date	Time	Event
Saturday, 27 September 2014	18:55	Round 1
Sunday, 28 September 2014	19:00	Semifinals
Sunday, 28 September 2014	21:00	Final

== Records ==
Prior to this competition, the existing world, Asian and Games records were as follows.

World Record	Usain Bolt (JAM)	9.58	Berlin, Germany	16 August 2009
Asian Record	Samuel Francis (QAT)	9.99	Amman, Jordan	26 July 2007
Games Record	Koji Ito (JPN)	10.00	Bangkok, Thailand	13 December 1998

== Results ==
=== Round 1 ===
- Qualification: First 3 in each heat (Q) and the next 4 fastest (q) advance to the semifinals.

==== Heat 1 ====
- Wind: −0.1 m/s

Rank	Athlete	Time	Notes
1	Ryota Yamagata (JPN)	10.21	Q
2	Zhang Peimeng (CHN)	10.27	Q
3	Jirapong Meenapra (THA)	10.45	Q
4	Tsui Chi Ho (HKG)	10.59	q
5	Meshaal Al-Mutairi (KUW)	10.77	
6	Pao Hin Fong (MAC)	11.02	

==== Heat 2 ====
- Wind: −0.3 m/s

Rank	Athlete	Time	Notes
1	Samuel Francis (QAT)	10.33	Q
2	Su Bingtian (CHN)	10.35	Q
3	Ruttanapon Sowan (THA)	10.56	Q
4	Amirudin Jamal (SIN)	10.61	q
5	Abbos Toshmatov (UZB)	10.83	
6	So Chun Hong (HKG)	10.89	

==== Heat 3 ====
- Wind: +0.1 m/s

Rank	Athlete	Time	Notes
1	Kei Takase (JPN)	10.21	Q
2	Kim Kuk-young (KOR)	10.30	Q
3	Reza Ghasemi (IRI)	10.33	Q
4	Hassan Saaid (MDV)	10.50	q
5	Battulgyn Achitbileg (MGL)	10.76	
6	Mohammed Abukhousa (PLE)	10.80	
7	Leong Wang Kuong (MAC)	10.89	

==== Heat 4 ====
- Wind: −0.2 m/s

Rank	Athlete	Time	Notes
1	Femi Ogunode (QAT)	10.14	Q
2	Barakat Al-Harthi (OMA)	10.32	Q
3	Hassan Taftian (IRI)	10.41	Q
4	Oh Kyong-soo (KOR)	10.50	q
5	Calvin Kang (SIN)	10.67	
6	Ganboldyn Shijirbaatar (MGL)	10.88	
7	Yam Sajan Sunar (NEP)	11.43	

=== Semifinals ===
- Qualification: First 3 in each heat (Q) and the next 2 fastest (q) advance to the final.

==== Heat 1 ====
- Wind: +1.2 m/s

Rank	Athlete	Time	Notes
1	Ryota Yamagata (JPN)	10.17	Q
2	Su Bingtian (CHN)	10.22	Q
3	Samuel Francis (QAT)	10.25	Q
4	Hassan Taftian (IRI)	10.34	
5	Kim Kuk-young (KOR)	10.35	
6	Tsui Chi Ho (HKG)	10.46	
7	Jirapong Meenapra (THA)	10.51	
8	Hassan Saaid (MDV)	10.59	

==== Heat 2 ====
- Wind: +0.2 m/s

Rank	Athlete	Time	Notes
1	Femi Ogunode (QAT)	10.02	Q
2	Kei Takase (JPN)	10.13	Q
3	Zhang Peimeng (CHN)	10.17	Q
4	Reza Ghasemi (IRI)	10.30	q
5	Barakat Al-Harthi (OMA)	10.31	q
6	Oh Kyong-soo (KOR)	10.44	
7	Ruttanapon Sowan (THA)	10.54	
8	Amirudin Jamal (SIN)	10.60	

=== Final ===
- Wind: +0.4 m/s

Rank	Athlete	Time	Notes
1st place, gold medalist(s)	Femi Ogunode (QAT)	9.93	AR
2nd place, silver medalist(s)	Su Bingtian (CHN)	10.10	
3rd place, bronze medalist(s)	Kei Takase (JPN)	10.15	
4	Zhang Peimeng (CHN)	10.18	
5	Reza Ghasemi (IRI)	10.25	
6	Ryota Yamagata (JPN)	10.26	
7	Barakat Al-Harthi (OMA)	10.29	
8	Samuel Francis (QAT)	10.41	
