= 2011 Asian Athletics Championships – Men's 200 metres =

The men's 200 metres at the 2011 Asian Athletics Championships was held at the Kobe Universiade Memorial Stadium on 9 and 10 July.

== Medalists ==
| Gold | Femi Seun Ogunode; Qatar |
| Silver | Hitoshi Saito; Japan |
| Bronze | Omar Jouma Al-Salfa; United Arab Emirates |

== Records ==
2011 Asian Athletics Championships
| World record | Usain Bolt (JAM) | 19.19 | Berlin, Germany | 20 August 2009 |
| Asian record | Shingo Suetsugu (JPN) | 20.03 | Yokohama, Japan | 26 July 2007 |
| Championship record | Jang Jae-Keun (KOR) | 20.41 | Jakarta, South Korea | 1985 |

== Results ==
=== Round 1 ===
First 2 in each heat (Q) and 2 best performers (q) advanced to the Final.

| Rank | Heat | Name | Nationality | Time | Notes |
|---|---|---|---|---|---|
| 1 | 2 | Femi Seun Ogunode | Qatar | 20.50 | Q |
| 2 | 2 | Shōta Iizuka | Japan | 20.91 | Q |
| 3 | 1 | Hitoshi Saito | Japan | 21.04 | Q |
| 4 | 3 | Omar Jouma Al-Salfa | United Arab Emirates | 21.10 | Q |
| 5 | 3 | Shehan Ambepitiya | Sri Lanka | 21.11 | Q |
| 6 | 2 | Yahya Al Noufali | Oman | 21.12 | q |
| 7 | 2 | Reza Ghasemi | Iran | 21.15 | q |
| 8 | 2 | Liang Tse-Ching | Chinese Taipei | 21.25 | SB |
| 9 | 1 | Abdullah Al-Sooli | Oman | 21.27 | Q |
| 10 | 2 | Mohammed Jummah | Iraq | 21.33 | SB |
| 11 | 3 | Vyacheslav Muravyev | Kazakhstan | 21.53 | |
| 12 | 3 | Zheng Dongsheng | China | 21.57 | |
| 13 | 1 | Leung Ki Ho | Hong Kong | 21.70 | |
| 14 | 1 | Liang Jiahong | China | 21.75 | |
| 15 | 3 | Battulgyn Achitbileg | Mongolia | 21.82 | |
| 16 | 3 | Calvin Kang Li Loong | Singapore | 21.86 | |
| 17 | 1 | Elfi Mustapa | Singapore | 22.42 | |
| 18 | 1 | Khalil Al-Hanahneh | Jordan | 22.49 | |
| 19 | 2 | M. Tsetsegmaa | Mongolia | 23.03 | |
| 20 | 3 | Yuichi Kobayashi | Japan | 32.11 | |
| 21 | 1 | Peyman Rajabi | Iran | DQ | 163.3(a) |

=== Final ===
| Rank | Lane | Name | Nationality | Time | Notes |
|---|---|---|---|---|---|
| 1st place, gold medalist(s) | 6 | Femi Seun Ogunode | Qatar | 20.41 | =CR |
| 2nd place, silver medalist(s) | 4 | Hitoshi Saito | Japan | 20.75 | |
| 3rd place, bronze medalist(s) | 5 | Omar Jouma Al-Salfa | United Arab Emirates | 20.97 | |
| 4 | 7 | Shōta Iizuka | Japan | 21.10 | |
| 5 | 8 | Abdullah Al-Sooli | Oman | 21.14 | |
| 6 | 9 | Shehan Ambepitiya | Sri Lanka | 21.16 | |
| 7 | 2 | Reza Ghasemi | Iran | 21.18 | |
| 8 | 3 | Yahya Al Noufali | Oman | 21.20 | |
