= Athletics at the 2010 Asian Games – Men's 200 metres =

Men's 200 metres at the 2010 Asian Games
- Venue: Aoti Main Stadium
- Dates: 24–25 November 2010
- Competitors: 24 from 14 nations

Medalists
gold medal	Femi Ogunode	Qatar
silver medal	Kenji Fujimitsu	Japan
bronze medal	Omar Juma Al-Salfa	United Arab Emirates

The men's 200 metres event at the 2010 Asian Games was held at the Aoti Main Stadium, Guangzhou, China on 24–25 November.

== Schedule ==
All times are China Standard Time (UTC+08:00)

Date	Time	Event
Wednesday, 24 November 2010	18:00	Round 1
Thursday, 25 November 2010	18:15	Final

== Records ==
Prior to this competition, the existing world, Asian and Games records were as follows.

World Record	Usain Bolt (JAM)	19.19	Berlin, Germany	20 August 2009
Asian Record	Shingo Suetsugu (JPN)	20.03	Yokohama, Japan	7 June 2003
Games Record	Koji Ito (JPN)	20.25	Bangkok, Thailand	18 December 1998

== Results ==
Legend

- DNS — Did not start

=== Round 1 ===
- Qualification: First 2 in each heat (Q) and the next 2 fastest (q) advance to the final.

==== Heat 1 ====
- Wind: +0.6 m/s

Rank	Athlete	Time	Notes
1	Femi Ogunode (QAT)	20.58	Q
2	Liang Jiahong (CHN)	21.05	Q
3	Leung Ki Ho (HKG)	21.25	
4	Mitsuhiro Abiko (JPN)	21.28	
5	Liang Tse-ching (TPE)	21.31	
6	Vyacheslav Muravyev (KAZ)	21.47	
7	Hamed Al-Bishi (KSA)	21.89	
8	Tilak Ram Tharu (NEP)	22.51	

==== Heat 2 ====
- Wind: +1.0 m/s

Rank	Athlete	Time	Notes
1	Omar Juma Al-Salfa (UAE)	20.63	Q
2	Kenji Fujimitsu (JPN)	20.80	Q
3	Abdullah Al-Sooli (OMA)	21.19	q
4	Dharambir Singh (IND)	21.52	
5	Faris Sharahili (KSA)	21.57	
6	Calvin Kang (SIN)	21.68	
7	Hassan Saaid (MDV)	22.16	
—	Yeo Ho-sua (KOR)	DNS	

==== Heat 3 ====
- Wind: +0.5 m/s

Rank	Athlete	Time	Notes
1	Suresh Sathya (IND)	~~21.02~~	Q
2	Jeon Duk-hyung (KOR)	21.09	Q
3	Samuel Francis (QAT)	21.16	q
4	Yahya Al-Noufali (OMA)	21.57	
5	Tang Yik Chun (HKG)	21.67	
6	Gary Yeo (SIN)	22.29	
7	Azneem Ahmed (MDV)	22.39	
—	Bilal Juma Al-Salfa (UAE)	DNS	

=== Final ===
- Wind: +1.4 m/s

Rank	Athlete	Time	Notes
1st place, gold medalist(s)	Femi Ogunode (QAT)	20.43	
2nd place, silver medalist(s)	Kenji Fujimitsu (JPN)	20.74	
3rd place, bronze medalist(s)	Omar Juma Al-Salfa (UAE)	20.83	
4	Liang Jiahong (CHN)	21.02	
5	Jeon Duk-hyung (KOR)	21.02	
6	Abdullah Al-Sooli (OMA)	21.37	
—	Samuel Francis (QAT)	DNS	
DQ	Suresh Sathya (IND)	~~21.07~~	

- Suresh Sathya of India originally finished 6th, but was later disqualified after IAAF announced that he had tested positive for Nandrolone prior to the Asian Games.
