= 2014 Asian Indoor Athletics Championships – Results =

These are the full results of the 2014 Asian Indoor Athletics Championships which took place on 15–16 February 2014 in Hangzhou, China.

== Men's results ==
=== 60 meters ===
Heats – 15 February

Rank	Heat	Name	Nationality	Time	Notes
1	1	Femi Seun Ogunode	Qatar	6.58	q
2	4	Samuel Francis	Qatar	6.62	q
3	3	Reza Ghasemi	Iran	6.72	q
4	3	Masashi Eriguchi	Japan	6.74	q
5	2	Eric Shauwn Cray	Philippines	6.77	q, NR
6	4	Mo Youxue	China	6.82	q
7	4	Calvin Kang Li Loong	Singapore	6.83	q
8	1	Yahya Al-Noufli	Oman	6.84	q
9	2	Ma Jun	China	6.87	
10	1	Tu Chia-lin	Chinese Taipei	6.90	
11	2	Ruttanapon Sowan	Thailand	6.92	
12	4	Liaquat Ali	Pakistan	6.92	
13	1	Muhammad Elfi Mustapa	Singapore	6.93	
14	2	Pan Po-yu	Chinese Taipei	6.96	
15	2	Akmyrat Orazgeldiyev	Turkmenistan	7.01	
16	3	Achitbileg Battulga	Mongolia	7.01	
17	3	Lam Kin Hang	Macau	7.06	
18	1	Valerii Ponomarev	Kyrgyzstan	7.07	
19	4	Kritsada Namsuwan	Thailand	7.08	
20	4	Yang Zi Xian	Macau	7.11	
21	2	Tsasbayar Sainbileg	Mongolia	7.50	
	1	Ildar Hojayev	Turkmenistan	DQ	
	3	Ng Ka Fung	Hong Kong	DQ	
	3	Barakat Al-Harthi	Oman	DQ	

Final – 15 February

Rank	Heat	Name	Nationality	Time	Notes
1st place, gold medalist(s)	2	Samuel Francis	Qatar	6.61	
2nd place, silver medalist(s)	2	Femi Seun Ogunode	Qatar	6.62	
3rd place, bronze medalist(s)	2	Reza Ghasemi	Iran	6.68	
4	2	Masashi Eriguchi	Japan	6.73	
5	1	Eric Shauwn Cray	Philippines	6.75	NR
6	1	Mo Youxue	China	6.77	
7	1	Calvin Kang Li Loong	Singapore	6.80	
8	1	Yahya Al-Noufli	Oman	6.85	

=== 400 meters ===
Heats – 15 February

Rank	Heat	Name	Nationality	Time	Notes
1	1	Sergey Zaikov	Kazakhstan	47.96	q
2	3	Mehdi Zamani	Iran	48.52	q
3	1	Chen Jianxin	China	48.56	q
4	3	Ahmed Mubarak Salah	Oman	48.71	q
5	1	Kazuya Watanabe	Japan	48.78	q
6	3	Igor Kondratyev	Kazakhstan	48.85	q
7	3	Ou Shaowei	China	48.86	
8	3	Chan Ka Chun	Hong Kong	49.00	NR
9	4	Mohammed Hindi	Oman	49.02	
10	4	Hadi Rahimi	Iran	49.09	
11	2	Yusuke Ishitsuka	Japan	49.18	
12	2	Artem Dyatlov	Uzbekistan	49.45	
13	2	Noureddine Hadid	Lebanon	49.63	NR
14	2	Aleksandr Pronzhenko	Tajikistan	50.04	NR
15	3	Lo Yen-yao	Chinese Taipei	50.08	
16	1	Leung King Hung	Hong Kong	50.21	
17	4	Wang Wen-tang	Chinese Taipei	51.90	
18	4	Ao Ieong Ka Hou	Macau	52.06	
19	2	Aleksei Namuratov	Kyrgyzstan	52.19	
	1	Lam Iong Sang	Macau	DNF	
	4	Femi Seun Ogunode	Qatar	DNS	

Final – 15 February

Rank	Name	Nationality	Time	Notes
1st place, gold medalist(s)	Mehdi Zamani	Iran	48.25	
2nd place, silver medalist(s)	Sergey Zaikov	Kazakhstan	48.37	
3rd place, bronze medalist(s)	Ahmed Mubarak Salah	Oman	48.51	
4	Chen Jianxin	China	48.61	
5	Kazuya Watanabe	Japan	48.68	
6	Igor Kondratyev	Kazakhstan	48.78	

=== 800 meters ===
Heats – 16 February

Rank	Heat	Name	Nationality	Time	Notes
1	1	Jamal Hairane	Qatar	1:53.60	Q
2	1	Yasuhiro Nakamura	Japan	1:53.66	Q
3	2	Musaeb Abdulrahman Balla	Qatar	1:54.69	Q
4	1	Sergey Tulapin	Kazakhstan	1:54.82	q
5	2	Ebrahim Al-Zofairi	Kuwait	1:54.83	Q
6	2	Farhan Ahmad	Pakistan	1:55.52	q
7	2	Jiang Xiaobin	China	1:55.60	
8	2	Jian Yong Leo Fang	Singapore	1:55.63	NR
9	1	Akhyt Asyekhan	Mongolia	1:55.99	
10	1	Aleskseii Namuratov	Kyrgyzstan	2:04.57	

Final – 16 February

Rank	Name	Nationality	Time	Notes
1st place, gold medalist(s)	Musaeb Abdulrahman Balla	Qatar	1:50.27	
2nd place, silver medalist(s)	Ebrahim Al-Zofairi	Kuwait	1:50.86	
3rd place, bronze medalist(s)	Yasuhiro Nakamura	Japan	1:50.94	
4	Jamal Hairane	Qatar	1:52.09	
5	Sergey Tulapin	Kazakhstan	1:55.24	
6	Farhan Ahmad	Pakistan	1:59.94	

=== 1500 meters ===
15 February

Rank	Name	Nationality	Time	Notes
1st place, gold medalist(s)	Mohamad Al-Garni	Qatar	3:48.79	
2nd place, silver medalist(s)	Hamza Driouch	Qatar	3:49.55	
3rd place, bronze medalist(s)	Omar Al-Rasheedi	Kuwait	3:50.79	
4	Hossein Keyhani	Iran	3:50.80	
5	Luo Yuxi	China	3:53.39	
6	Ali Fahimi	Iran	3:55.41	
7	Munkhbayar Narandulam	Mongolia	3:55.48	NR
8	Adilet Kyshtakbekov	Kyrgyzstan	3:59.29	
9	Erzhan Askarov	Kyrgyzstan	4:00.02	
10	Akhyt Asyekhan	Mongolia	4:01.92	
	Farhan Ahmad	Pakistan	DNS	

=== 3000 meters ===
16 February

Rank	Name	Nationality	Time	Notes
1st place, gold medalist(s)	Mohamad Al-Garni	Qatar	8:08.65	
2nd place, silver medalist(s)	Abubaker Ali Kamal	Qatar	8:09.48	
3rd place, bronze medalist(s)	Tetsuya Yoroizaka	Japan	8:11.73	
4	Zhang Songlin	China	8:13.61	
5	Ali Fahimi	Iran	8:23.67	
6	Munkhbayar Narandulam	Mongolia	8:34.15	NR
7	Adilet Kyshtakbekov	Kyrgyzstan	8:35.44	
8	Erzhan Askarov	Kyrgyzstan	8:36.63	

=== 60 meters hurdles ===
Heats – 15 February

Rank	Heat	Name	Nationality	Time	Notes
1	2	Abdulaziz Al-Mandeel	Kuwait	7.87	q
2	3	Yaqoub Mohamed Al-Youha	Kuwait	7.90	q
3	1	Huang Hao	China	7.96	q
4	2	Jiang Fan	China	8.11	q
5	2	Arumugam Suresh	India	8.14	q
6	3	Saif Sabbah Khalifa	Qatar	8.17	q
7	1	Ameer Shakir	Iraq	8.22	q
8	1	Rio Maholtra	Indonesia	8.25	q, NR
9	2	Kwong Ming Kin	Hong Kong	8.27	
10	3	Yang Wei-ting	Chinese Taipei	8.30	
11	3	Milad Sayyar	Iran	8.35	
12	1	Iong Kim Fai	Macau	8.44	
13	1	Ko Wen-bin	Chinese Taipei	8.66	
14	2	Ali Hazer	Lebanon	8.67	
15	3	Eric Shauwn Cray	Philippines	8.97	
	3	Mohsin Ali	Pakistan	DQ	

Final – 15 February

Rank	Heat	Name	Nationality	Time	Notes
1st place, gold medalist(s)	2	Abdulaziz Al-Mandeel	Kuwait	7.80	
2nd place, silver medalist(s)	2	Yaqoub Mohamed Al-Youha	Kuwait	7.90	
3rd place, bronze medalist(s)	2	Huang Hao	China	7.90	
4	2	Jiang Fan	China	7.91	
5	1	Arumugam Suresh	India	8.08	NR
6	1	Saif Sabbah Khalifa	Qatar	8.09	
7	1	Rio Maholtra	Indonesia	8.27	
	1	Ameer Shakir	Iraq	DNS	

=== 4 x 400 meters relay ===
16 February

Rank	Nation	Athletes	Time	Notes
1st place, gold medalist(s)	Kazakhstan	Dmitriy Korabelnikov, Igor Kondratyev, Omirserik Bekenov, Sergey Zaikov	3:12.94	CR, NR
2nd place, silver medalist(s)	China	Zhang Huadong, Qin Jian, Chen Jianxin, Zhu Chenbin	3:13.43	
3rd place, bronze medalist(s)	Oman	Obaid Al-Quraini, Ahmed Al-Marjabi, Othman Al-Busaidi, Ahmed Mubarak Salah	3:13.49	NR
4	Iran	Reza Ghasemi, Hadi Rahimi, Hossein Keyhani, Mehdi Zamani	3:13.55	
	Macau		DNS	
	Kuwait		DNS	

=== High jump ===
16 February

Rank	Name	Nationality	2.00	2.10	2.15	2.20	2.24	2.30	2.36	2.41	Result	Notes
1st place, gold medalist(s)	Mutaz Essa Barshim	Qatar	–	–	o	o	xxo	o	xo	xxx	2.36	
2nd place, silver medalist(s)	Majededdin Ghazal	Syria	–	o	o	o	xxx				2.20	
3rd place, bronze medalist(s)	Zhang Guowei	China	o	o	o	xo	xxx				2.20	
4	Yuriy Dergachev	Kazakhstan	o	o	xxo	xo	xxx				2.20	
5	Li Peng	China	o	o	o	xxx					2.15	
6	Bai Long	China	o	o	xxo	xxx					2.15	
7	Muamer Aissa Barsham	Qatar	o	o	xxx						2.10	
8	Nauraj Singh Randhawa	Malaysia	xo	o	xxx						2.10	
9	Anton Bodnar	Kazakhstan	–	xo	x–	xx					2.10	
9	Hsiang Chun-hsien	Chinese Taipei	o	xo	xxx						2.10	NR
11	Lui Tsz Hin Daniel	Hong Kong	o	xxx							2.00	

=== Pole vault ===
15 February

Rank	Name	Nationality	4.60	5.00	5.15	5.30	5.30	5.25	5.20	5.15	Result	Notes
1st place, gold medalist(s)	Hsieh Chia-han	Chinese Taipei	–	o	o	xxx	x	x	x	o	5.15	
2nd place, silver medalist(s)	Zhou Bo	China	–	o	o	xxx	x	x	x	x	5.15	
3rd place, bronze medalist(s)	Ryo Tanaka	Japan	–	xo	xxo	xxx					5.15	
4	Han Duh-yeon	South Korea	–	o	xxx						5.00	
4	Lu Yao	China	–	o	xxx						5.00	
	Iskandar Alwi	Malaysia	xxx								NM	

=== Long jump ===
15 February

Rank	Name	Nationality	#1	#2	#3	#4	#5	#6	Result	Notes
1st place, gold medalist(s)	Saleh Abdelaziz Al-Haddad	Kuwait	7.82	7.94	7.51	7.75	–	–	7.94	NR
2nd place, silver medalist(s)	Mohammad Arzandeh	Iran	7.72	7.66	7.71	7.80	x	x	7.80	NR
3rd place, bronze medalist(s)	Xie Lei	China	7.65	x	x	7.76	x	x	7.76	
4	Zhang Yaoguang	China	7.69	x	7.59	x	x	7.67	7.69	
5	Konstantin Safronov	Kazakhstan	7.47	x	7.35	7.36	7.48	7.50	7.50	
6	Henry Dagmil	Philippines	7.14	7.30	7.27	7.07	7.17	7.43	7.43	
7	Lin Hung-Min	Chinese Taipei	7.24	x	7.22	7.29	7.27	x	7.29	
8	Andrey Reznichenko	Uzbekistan	7.22	x	6.99	x	x	x	7.22	
9	Tsai I-Ta	Chinese Taipei	6.93	7.21	7.19				7.21	
10	Noval Kurniawan	Indonesia	6.72	6.95	6.90				6.95	=NR
11	Abdulrahman Khamis	Bahrain	6.89	6.65	6.62				6.89	
12	Tam Chon Lok	Macau	6.40	6.44	6.27				6.44	
13	Tsasbayar Sainbileg	Mongolia	6.08	4.45	x				6.08	

=== Triple jump ===
16 February

Rank	Name	Nationality	#1	#2	#3	#4	#5	#6	Result	Notes
1st place, gold medalist(s)	Fu Haitao	China	x	x	15.36	16.20	x	16.21	16.21	
2nd place, silver medalist(s)	Roman Valiyev	Kazakhstan	x	x	16.16	15.91	x	x	16.16	
3rd place, bronze medalist(s)	Ruslan Kurbanov	Uzbekistan	15.83	16.00	15.98	15.77	15.67	x	16.00	
4	Muhammad Hakimi Ismail	Malaysia	15.09	15.46	15.51	x	15.51	16.00	16.00	NR
5	Mohamed Salman	Bahrain	15.77	15.62	15.71	15.78	15.97	15.76	15.97	NR
6	Zhang Yaoguang	China	15.62	15.59	15.16	15.49	–	15.97	15.97	
7	Daigo Hasegawa	Japan	15.73	15.16	15.52	15.81	15.34	15.53	15.81	
8	Vasilis Monolis	Uzbekistan	14.99	15.35	15.26	15.16	15.15	x	15.35	
9	Abdullah Al-Youhah	Kuwait	14.89	x	15.14				15.14	
10	Tam Chon Lok	Macau	x	13.30	13.48				13.48	

=== Shot put ===
16 February

Rank	Name	Nationality	#1	#2	#3	#4	#5	#6	Result	Notes
1st place, gold medalist(s)	Om Prakash Singh Karhana	India	18.09	17.39	17.75	18.45	19.07	x	19.07	
2nd place, silver medalist(s)	Wang Guangfu	China	18.40	18.59	x	18.46	18.38	18.64	18.64	
3rd place, bronze medalist(s)	Li Jun	China	17.83	x	18.11	18.33	18.03	18.52	18.52	
4	Mashari Mohammad	Kuwait	x	18.05	18.26	x	x	x	18.26	
5	Grigoriy Kamulya	Uzbekistan	17.95	x	18.09	18.15	x	x	18.15	
6	Sergey Dementev	Uzbekistan	17.33	x	16.99	17.83	17.36	17.60	17.83	
7	Adi Aliffuddin Hussin	Malaysia	15.99	16.03	16.00	16.06	16.13	15.79	16.13	
8	Tejen Hommadov	Turkmenistan	14.96	15.58	15.12	15.55	x	x	15.58	

=== Heptathlon ===
15–16 February

The highest mark recorded in each event is highlighted in yellow

Rank	Athlete	Nationality	60m	LJ	SP	HJ	60m H	PV	1000m	Points	Notes
1st place, gold medalist(s)	Dmitriy Karpov	Kazakhstan	7.24	6.97	15.91	1.99	8.42	4.80	2:48.78	5752	
2nd place, silver medalist(s)	Akihiko Nakamura	Japan	7.03	7.02	11.48	1.96	8.22	4.60	2:33.78	5693	NR
3rd place, bronze medalist(s)	Leonid Andreev	Uzbekistan	7.24	7.07	14.49	1.99	8.58	5.10	3:06.88	5561	
4	Guo Qi	China	7.33	6.51	12.90	1.93	8.39	4.70	2:57.10	5268	
5	Wang Qunhao	China	7.43	6.58	11.35	1.96	8.39	4.30	2:41.57	5230	
6	Jesson Ramil Cid	Philippines	7.07	6.77	11.35	1.84	8.26	NM	2:46.55	4565	NR
	Hadi Sepehrzad	Iran	7.17	6.39	15.76	1.96	8.38	DNS	–	DNF	
	Abdoljalil Toumaj	Iran	7.21	6.81	12.73	1.96	8.42	NM	DNS	DNF	

== Women's results ==
=== 60 meters ===
Heats – 15 February

Rank	Heat	Name	Nationality	Time	Notes
1	1	Olga Safronova	Kazakhstan	7.39	q
2	2	Tao Yujia	China	7.46	q
3	2	Maryam Toosi	Iran	7.47	q
4	2	Fong Yee Pui	Hong Kong	7.55	q, NR
5	1	Veronica Shanti Pereira	Singapore	7.62	q, NR
6	1	Lin Huijun	China	7.70	q
7	1	Lam On Ki	Hong Kong	7.70	q
8	1	Khanrutai Pakdee	Thailand	7.72	q
9	2	Aziza Sbaity	Lebanon	7.92	
10	2	Maysa Rejepova	Turkmenistan	7.98	
11	2	Nigina Sharipova	Uzbekistan	7.99	

Final – 15 February

Rank	Heat	Name	Nationality	Time	Notes
1st place, gold medalist(s)	2	Tao Yujia	China	7.36	
2nd place, silver medalist(s)	2	Olga Safronova	Kazakhstan	7.41	
3rd place, bronze medalist(s)	2	Maryam Toosi	Iran	7.50	
4	2	Fong Yee Pui	Hong Kong	7.55	=NR
5	1	Lin Huijun	China	7.57	
6	1	Khanrutai Pakdee	Thailand	7.58	
7	1	Veronica Shanti Pereira	Singapore	7.61	NR
8	1	Lam On Ki	Hong Kong	7.67	

=== 400 meters ===
Heats – 15 February

Rank	Heat	Name	Nationality	Time	Notes
1	1	Yuliya Rakhmanova	Kazakhstan	54.97	q
2	1	Maryam Toosi	Iran	55.35	q
3	1	Cheng Chong	China	56.08	q
4	2	Olga Andreyeva	Kazakhstan	56.66	q
5	1	Anilda Thomas	India	56.97	q
6	2	Natalya Asanova	Uzbekistan	57.47	q
7	2	Chen Jingwen	China	59.05	

Final – 15 February

Rank	Name	Nationality	Time	Notes
1st place, gold medalist(s)	Maryam Toosi	Iran	54.24	
2nd place, silver medalist(s)	Yuliya Rakhmanova	Kazakhstan	54.37	
3rd place, bronze medalist(s)	Olga Andreyeva	Kazakhstan	55.74	
4	Anilda Thomas	India	56.08	
5	Cheng Chong	China	56.86	
6	Natalya Asanova	Uzbekistan	56.96	

=== 800 meters ===
16 February

Rank	Name	Nationality	Time	Notes
1st place, gold medalist(s)	Tatyana Yurchenko	Kazakhstan	2:14.20	
2nd place, silver medalist(s)	Ksenia Faiskanova	Kyrgyzstan	2:14.47	
3rd place, bronze medalist(s)	Tatyana Neroznak	Kazakhstan	2:14.61	
4	Lismawati Ilang	Indonesia	2:15.44	NR
5	Jiang Zirui	China	2:29.10	

=== 1500 meters ===
15 February

Rank	Name	Nationality	Time	Notes
1st place, gold medalist(s)	Maryam Yusuf Jamal	Bahrain	4:19.42	
2nd place, silver medalist(s)	Betlhem Desalegn	United Arab Emirates	4:19.83	
3rd place, bronze medalist(s)	Viktoriia Poliudina	Kyrgyzstan	4:25.36	NR
4	Irina Moroz	Uzbekistan	4:25.98	
5	Ksenia Faiskanova	Kyrgyzstan	4:30.39	
6	Shinetsetseg Chuluunkhuu	Mongolia	4:38.07	NR
7	Zang Chunxue	China	4:57.18	

=== 3000 meters ===
16 February

Rank	Name	Nationality	Time	Notes
1st place, gold medalist(s)	Maryam Yusuf Jamal	Bahrain	8:43.16	CR, NR
2nd place, silver medalist(s)	Betlhem Desalegn	United Arab Emirates	8:46.54	NR
3rd place, bronze medalist(s)	Alia Saeed Mohammed	United Arab Emirates	8:56.78	
4	Irina Moroz	Uzbekistan	9:33.64	
5	Gulshanoi Satarova	Kyrgyzstan	9:34.77	
6	Viktoriia Poliudina	Kyrgyzstan	9:39.28	
7	Shinetsetseg Chuluunkhuu	Mongolia	10:03.91	
8	Li Wenjie	China	10:30.72	

=== 60 meters hurdles ===
15 February

Rank	Name	Nationality	Time	Notes
1st place, gold medalist(s)	Wu Shuijiao	China	8.02	CR, NR
2nd place, silver medalist(s)	Anastassiya Pilipenko	Kazakhstan	8.27	
3rd place, bronze medalist(s)	Sun Yawei	China	8.37	
4	Lui Lai Yiu	Hong Kong	8.76	
5	Raja Azhar	Malaysia	8.78	
6	Lo Wing Yee	Hong Kong	8.89	

=== 4 x 400 meters relay ===
16 February

Rank	Nation	Athletes	Time	Notes
1st place, gold medalist(s)	Kazakhstan	Elina Mikhina, Tatyana Yurchenko, Olga Andreyeva, Yuliya Rakhmanova	3:42.45	
2nd place, silver medalist(s)	Thailand	Karat Srimuang, Atchima Eng-Chuan, Pornpan Hoemhuk, Treewadee Yongphan	3:42.55	
3rd place, bronze medalist(s)	China	Zhou Yanling, Chen Jingwen, Li Manyuan, Wang Huan	3:43.89	
4	Kyrgyzstan	Gulshanoi Satarova, Anna Bulanova, Viktoriya Poliudina, Ksenia Faiskanova	4:12.29	

=== High jump ===
16 February

Rank	Name	Nationality	1.65	1.70	1.75	1.80	1.84	1.88	1.91	1.94	1.96	1.98	Result	Notes
1st place, gold medalist(s)	Svetlana Radzivil	Uzbekistan	–	–	–	o	xo	o	xo	o	xo	xxx	1.96	CR, =NR
2nd place, silver medalist(s)	Zheng Xingjuan	China	–	–	–	o	o	xo	o	xxx			1.91	
3rd place, bronze medalist(s)	Zhao Jian	China	o	o	o	xo	xxx						1.80	
4	Zhang Luyu	China	o	o	o	xxx							1.75	
5	Yuki Mimura	Japan	xo	o	xxx								1.70	

=== Pole vault ===
15 February

Rank	Name	Nationality	3.60	3.80	4.00	4.15	4.30	4.40	Result	Notes
1st place, gold medalist(s)	Tomomi Abiko	Japan	–	–	o	o	o	xxx	4.30	
2nd place, silver medalist(s)	Ren Mengqian	China	–	–	o	o	xxx		4.15	
2nd place, silver medalist(s)	Xu Huiqin	China	–	–	o	o	x–	xx	4.15	
4	Kanae Tatsuta	Japan	o	o	xxx				3.80	
5	Khyati Vakharia	India	xo	xo	xxx				3.80	NR
6	Liu Jingyi	China	o	xxx					3.60	

=== Long jump ===
15 February

Rank	Name	Nationality	#1	#2	#3	#4	#5	#6	Result	Notes
1st place, gold medalist(s)	Yurina Hiraka	Japan	6.12	6.22	6.15	6.07	x	6.34	6.34	
2nd place, silver medalist(s)	Darya Reznichenko	Uzbekistan	6.15	6.03	5.98	6.30	x	6.25	6.30	
3rd place, bronze medalist(s)	Jiang Yanfei	China	6.01	6.22	x	6.19	x	x	6.22	
4	Maria Natalia Londa	Indonesia	6.08	x	6.18	x	6.02	5.69	6.18	
5	Anastasiya Juravleva	Uzbekistan	5.82	6.13	6.15	6.14	x	6.07	6.15	
6	Wang Wupin	China	6.12	x	6.13	x	x	x	6.13	
7	Anna Bulanova	Kyrgyzstan	5.32	5.64	5.78	x	x	5.63	5.78	
8	Nurul Jannah Mohd Zulkifli	Singapore	x	x	5.24	5.15	5.33	5.27	5.33	NR

=== Triple jump ===
16 February

Rank	Name	Nationality	#1	#2	#3	#4	#5	#6	Result	Notes
1st place, gold medalist(s)	Anastasiya Juravleva	Uzbekistan	13.43	13.37	13.60	13.55	–	x	13.60	
2nd place, silver medalist(s)	Aleksandra Kotlyarova	Uzbekistan	x	13.45	x	x	x	13.25	13.45	
3rd place, bronze medalist(s)	Li Xiaohong	China	13.43	x	13.30	x	x	13.42	13.43	
4	Deng Lina	China	13.22	13.26	13.05	13.03	12.71	13.15	13.26	
5	Thitima Muangjan	Thailand	x	13.11	13.25	12.98	13.16	13.05	13.25	
6	Irina Ektova	Kazakhstan	12.97	x	x	12.96	13.09	13.05	13.09	
7	Sheena Nellickal Varkey	India	12.48	x	12.16	12.29	12.48	x	12.48	
8	Yekaterina Ektova	Kazakhstan	x	12.38	x	x	x	x	12.38	

=== Shot put ===
15 February

Rank	Name	Nationality	#1	#2	#3	#4	#5	#6	Result	Notes
1st place, gold medalist(s)	Sofiya Burkhanova	Uzbekistan	16.39	15.61	16.34	16.60	16.80	16.57	16.80	
2nd place, silver medalist(s)	Bian Ka	China	15.76	15.89	16.15	16.44	15.86	16.60	16.60	
3rd place, bronze medalist(s)	Lin Chia-ying	Chinese Taipei	15.53	x	x	x	16.52	16.08	16.52	NR
4	Xu Jiaqi	China	14.78	15.46	14.75	15.55	15.10	x	15.55	

=== Pentathlon ===
16 February

The highest mark recorded in each event is highlighted in yellow

Rank	Athlete	Nationality	60m H	HJ	SP	LJ	800m	Points	Notes
1st place, gold medalist(s)	Wang Qingling	China	8.58	1.75	12.34	6.17	2:26.02	4246	
2nd place, silver medalist(s)	Yuliya Tarasova	Uzbekistan	8.88	1.63	12.88	6.00	2:28.68	3985	
3rd place, bronze medalist(s)	Irina Karpova	Kazakhstan	8.98	1.72	11.90	5.62	2:24.05	3951	
4	Yekaterina Voronina	Uzbekistan	9.71	1.69	13.32	5.81	2:24.09	3951	
5	Sepideh Tavakoli	Iran	9.10	1.69	12.35	5.30	2:28.82	3951	
6	Zhang Huan	China	8.92	1.57	9.81	5.77	2:25.85	3671	
7	Li Weijian	China	8.91	1.57	10.30	5.52	2:33.54	3534	
8	Chu Chia-Ling	Chinese Taipei	8.92	1.57	11.44	5.47	2:39.27	3524	
9	Krystel Saneh	Lebanon	9.39 NR	1.51 NR	8.43 NR	5.30	2:37.90	3129	NR
10	Irina Velihanova	Turkmenistan	9.86	NM	10.19	4.91	2:29.97	2508	
