= 2008 Asian Junior Athletics Championships =

13th Asian Junior Championships
- Dates: 12–15 July
- Host city: Jakarta, Indonesia
- Venue: Madya Stadium
- Level: Junior (under-20)
- Events: 44

The 2008 Asian Junior Athletics Championships was the 13th edition of the international athletics competition for Asian under-20 athletes, organised by the Asian Athletics Association. It took place from 12 to 15 July at the Madya Stadium in Jakarta. It was the third occasion that the Indonesian capital had hosted the event, following the inaugural edition in 1986 and the fifth hosting in 1994. A total of 44 events were contested, which were divided equally between male and female athletes.

== Medal summary ==
=== Men ===
Event	Gold		Silver		Bronze	
100 metres	Lai Chun Ho (HKG)	10.43	Shehan Abeypitiyage (SRI)	10.55	Tsui Chi Ho (HKG)	10.56
200 metres	Omar Juma Al-Salfa (UAE)	21.04	Huang Xiang (CHN)	21.26	Adel Jaber Al-Asseri (KSA)	21.38
400 metres	Ismail Al-Sabani (KSA)	46.33	Yu Cheng (CHN)	46.93	Seong Hyeok-Je (KOR)	47.40
800 metres	Musaab Bala (QAT)	1:52.45	Amir Moradi (IRI)	1:52.62	Janaka Weerasinghe (SRI)	1:53.53
1500 metres	Charles Koech (QAT)	3:48.46	Emad Noor (KSA)	3:49.47	Xu Song (CHN)	3:52.81
5000 metres	Charles Koech (QAT)	14:29.55	Ryuji Kashiwabara (JPN)	14:52.05	Jeong Jin-Hyeok (KOR)	15:00.39
10,000 metres	Majid Saleh Bashir (BHR)	33:08.17	Mohammad Faraji (IRI)	34:25.74	Ridwan (INA)	34:33.28
110 metres hurdles	Jin Nakamura (JPN)	13.69	Ko Wen-Ting (TPE)	13.70	Sami Al-Haydar (KSA)	13.87
400 metres hurdles	Tomoharu Kino (JPN)	50.76	Lee Seung-yun (KOR)	50.95	Jassim Waleed Al-Mas (KUW)	52.16
3000 metres steeplechase	Majid Saleh Bashir (BHR)	8:56.90	Wang Chiu-Chun (TPE)	9:17.42	Mohammad Faraji (IRI)	9:24.72
4 × 100 m relay	Japan (JPN); Genki Kawai; Seiya Hane; Kohei Yoshida; Shogo Yano	40.22	Thailand (THA); Poommanus Jankem; Wattana Deewong; Weerawat Pharueang; Suppachai Chimdee	40.31	Hong Kong (HKG); Chan Kei Fung; Tsui Chi Ho; Tong Hang; Lai Chun Ho	41.17
4 × 400 m relay	Thailand (THA); Yotsanee Chanwit; Chanatip Ruckburee; Saharat Sammayan; Suppachai Chimdee	3:10.86	India (IND); Jithin Paul; Parveen Kumar; Inderjit Singh; Shejil Varghese	3:12.94	Saudi Arabia (KSA); Faris Al-Sharaheli; Adel Jaber Al-Asseri; Emad Noor; Ismail Al-Sabani	3:15.65
10,000 metres walk	Yang Tao (CHN)	43:21.27	Geng Lingfu (CHN)	43:43.91	Hiroki Nagaiwa (JPN)	45:07.14
High jump	Lakshmanan Yogaraj (IND)	2.14 m	Chen Cheng (CHN)	2.14 m	Manato Onoda (JPN)	2.11 m
Pole vault	Yuya Ariake (JPN)	5.20 m	Liao Shu-Kai (TPE)	4.80 m	Nikita Filippov (KAZ)	4.80 m
Long jump	Weng Yongfeng (CHN)	8.05 m CR	Mubarak Al-Jaseer (KSA)	7.74 m (w)	Li Jinzhe (CHN)	7.47 m
Triple jump	Mohamed Yusuf Salman (BHR)	16.64 m	Jiang Wei (CHN)	16.10 m	Yang Yang (CHN)	16.06 m
Shot put	Grigoriy Kamulya (UZB)	19.96 m	Sergey Dementev (UZB)	18.43 m	Jasdeep Singh Dhillon (IND)	18.04 m
Discus throw	Mosta'an Motamed (IRI)	58.69 m	Hamed Mansour (SYR)	56.36 m	Huang Wei (CHN)	55.31 m
Hammer throw	Park Yeong-Sik (KOR)	65.03 m	Alisher Eshbekov (TJK)	64.57 m	Odai Amir Hwafdeh (QAT)	57.45 m
Javelin throw	Bobur Shokirjonov (UZB)	66.03 m	Park Won-Kil (KOR)	64.70 m	Rajimatollah Tatari (IRI)	63.71 m
Decathlon	Alexandr Chernov (KAZ)	6434 pts	Yun Yeong-Hak (KOR)	6226 pts	Ahmed Al-Maqbali (OMA)	5773 pts

=== Women ===
Event	Gold		Silver		Bronze	
100 metres	Sintara Seangdee (THA)	11.75	Han Huijiang (CHN)	11.88	Serafi Anelies Unani (INA)	11.93
200 metres	Sintara Seangdee (THA)	24.10	Tassaporn Wannakit (THA)	24.43	Liu Tingting (CHN)	24.64
400 metres	Chen Lin (CHN)	53.68	Huang Meiling (CHN)	54.74	Yen Tai-Ting (TPE)	55.29
800 metres	Tong Xiaomei (CHN)	2:06.64	Tintu Luka (IND)	2:08.63	Bindu Simon Rajam (IND)	2:11.13
1500 metres	Liu Fang (CHN)	4:28.50	Bindu Simon Rajam (IND)	4:29.18	Viktoriya Poliudina (KGZ)	4:31.45
3000 metres	Michi Numata (JPN)	9:33.86	Savita Dhankhar (IND)	9:39.83	Viktoriya Poliudina (KGZ)	9:41.21
5000 metres	Hao Xiaofan (CHN)	17:08.84	Kasumi Nishihara (JPN)	17:11.14	Akiko Matsuyama (JPN)	17:20.11
100 metres hurdles	Deng Ru (CHN)	13.59	Wang Li (CHN)	13.84	Nazomi Yamamoto (JPN)	13.95
400 metres hurdles	Ghofran Al-Mouhmad (SYR)	57.85	Deng Xiaoqing (CHN)	58.76	Taissa Makhmayeva (KAZ)	59.30
3000 metres steeplechase	Marina Podkorytova (KAZ)	10:57.59	Bara'h Awadallah (JOR)	11:32.90	Novita Andriani (INA)	11:37.25
4 × 100 m relay	Thailand (THA); Kamonch Sornplod; Sintara Seangdee; Tassaporn Wannakit; Athchima Engchuan	45.95	China (CHN); Deng Ru; Huang Meiling; Liu Tingting; Han Huijiang	45.98	Chinese Taipei (TPE); Chuang Chih-Han; Chang Hsin-Fang; Yen Tai-Ting; Lin Wen-Wen	47.05
4 × 400 m relay	China (CHN); Han Huijiang; Tong Xiaomei; Huang Meiling; Chen Lin	3:39.67	Kazakhstan (KAZ); Natalya Tukova; Yelena Geptina; Margarita Kudinova; Taissa Makhmayeva	3:42.20	India (IND); Juana Murmu; Chinchu Jose; Anu Mariam Jose; Tintu Luka	3:42.47
10,000 metres walk	Yu Miao (CHN)	46:17.44 CR	Li Yanfei (CHN)	46:46.52	Kumiko Okada (JPN)	47:01.45
High jump	Jessica Fung Wai Yee (HKG)	1.78 m	Xu Jie (CHN)	1.74 m	Duong Thi Viet Anh (VIE)	1.70 m
Pole vault	Tomoko Sumiishi (JPN)	3.90 m	Huang Minming (CHN)	3.90 m	Miki Motomiya (JPN)	3.70 m
Long jump	Bao Sha (CHN)	6.32 m	Li Yanmei (CHN)	6.28 m	Bae Chan-Mi (KOR)	6.10 m
Triple jump	Li Yanmei (CHN)	13.60 m	Maria Londa (INA)	13.24 m	Hu Qian (CHN)	13.01 m
Shot put	Meng Qianqian (CHN)	16.49 m	Ma Qiao (CHN)	14.68 m	Sofiya Burkhanova (UZB)	14.16 m
Discus throw	Xi Shangxue (CHN)	52.63 m	Jin Yuanyuan (CHN)	52.40 m	Li Wen-hua (TPE)	52.15 m
Hammer throw	Galina Mityaeva (TJK)	57.83 m	Lee Jae-Young (KOR)	54.15 m	Tatyana Bem (KAZ)	52.24 m
Javelin throw	Li Lingwei (CHN)	54.72 m	Anastasiya Svechnikova (UZB)	51.58 m	Riyoko Miyamoto (JPN)	50.76 m
Heptathlon	Chu Chia-Ling (TPE)	4871 pts	Lee Yi-Jung (TPE)	4730 pts	Olga Lapina (KAZ)	4697 pts

== 2008 Medal Table ==
Rank	Nation	Gold	Silver	Bronze	Total
1	China (CHN)	14	16	6	36
2	Japan (JPN)	6	2	7	15
3	Thailand (THA)	4	2	0	6
4	Qatar (QAT)	3	0	1	4
5	Bahrain (BHR)	3	0	0	3
6	Uzbekistan (UZB)	2	2	1	5
7	Kazakhstan (KAZ)	2	1	4	7
8	Hong Kong (HKG)	2	0	2	4
9	Chinese Taipei (TPE)	1	4	3	8
9	India (IND)	1	4	3	8
9	South Korea (KOR)	1	4	3	8
12	Saudi Arabia (KSA)	1	2	3	6
13	Iran (IRI)	1	2	2	5
14	Syria (SYR)	1	1	0	2
14	Tajikistan (TJK)	1	1	0	2
16	United Arab Emirates (UAE)	1	0	0	1
17	Indonesia (INA)	0	1	3	4
18	Sri Lanka (SRI)	0	1	1	2
19	Jordan (JOR)	0	1	0	1
20	Kyrgyzstan (KGZ)	0	0	2	2
21	Kuwait (KUW)	0	0	1	1
21	Oman (OMA)	0	0	1	1
21	Vietnam (VIE)	0	0	1	1
Totals (23 entries)		44	44	44	132
