= List of Mongolian records in athletics =

The following are the national records in athletics in Mongolia maintained by the Mongolian Athletic Federation (MAF).

== Outdoor ==
Key to tables: Awaiting ratification Record not kept by MAF Not ratified or later rescinded by MAF

=== Men ===
Event	Record	Athlete	Date	Meet	Place	Ref.
100 m	10.62 (+1.2 m/s)	Achitbileg Battulga	25 June 2016	Kosanov Memorial	Almaty, Kazakhstan	
100 m	10.3 h	Achitbileg Battulga	17 July 2014		Ulaanbaatar, Mongolia	
200 m	21.53 (+0.8 m/s)	Achitbileg Battulga	30 September 2014	Asian Games	Incheon, South Korea	
400 m	48.15	Tsendsuren Erdene-Munkh	14 June 1989		Bratislava, Czechoslovakia	
800 m	1:52.63	Chuluunbaatar Ariunsaichan	7 June 1988		Ostrava, Czechoslovakia	
800 m	1:51.67	Myagmarsuren Davaanyam	9 August 2026		China	
800 m	1:52.6 h	Tumur Ankhbayar	22 June 2005		Ulan-Ude, Russia	
1500 m	3:49.7 h	Davaajav Ganbold	1 June 1980		Ulaanbaatar, Mongolia	
3000 m	8:29.80	Chadaa Usni-Ek	10 June 1984		Sochi, Soviet Union	
5000 m	14:12.86	Ser-Od Bat-Ochir	3 April 2021	Umemura Gakuen Competition	Toyota, Japan	
5 km (road)	14:23+	Ser-Od Bat-Ochir	19 November 2023	Ageo City Half Marathon	Ageo, Japan	
10,000 m	29:17.72	Ser-Od Bat-Ochir	9 October 2020	21st Chubu Business Group Athletics Championships and Tajima Festival	Tajimi, Japan	
10 km (road)	28:56+	Ser-Od Bat-Ochir	7 February 2016	Kagawa Marugame Half Marathon	Marugame, Japan	
15 km (road)	43:54+	Ser-Od Bat-Ochir	7 February 2016	Kagawa Marugame Half Marathon	Marugame, Japan	
20 km (road)	58:54+	Ser-Od Bat-Ochir	7 February 2016	Kagawa Marugame Half Marathon	Marugame, Japan	
Half marathon	1:02:10	Ser-Od Bat-Ochir	7 February 2016	Marugame Half Marathon	Marugame, Japan	
25 km (road)	1:14:29+	Ser-Od Bat-Ochir	25 February 2024	Osaka Marathon	Osaka, Japan	
30 km (road)	1:29:56+	Ser-Od Bat-Ochir	25 February 2024	Osaka Marathon	Osaka, Japan	
Marathon	2:08:50	Ser-Od Bat-Ochir	7 December 2014	Fukuoka Marathon	Fukuoka, Japan	
110 m hurdles	16.36 NWI	Gombo Munkhsaikhan	5 August 1977		Sofia, Bulgaria	
110 m hurdles	16.05 NWI	Munkhorgil Tuvden	4 May 2018	Bill Jackson Invitational	Lockport, United States	
300 m hurdles	44.24	Munkhorgil Tuvden			United States	
400 m hurdles	54.00	Tsendsuren Erdene-Munkh	20 June 1990		Bratislava, Czechoslovakia	
3000 m steeplechase	9:11.39	Davaajav Ganbold	24 July 1981		Leningrad, Soviet Union	
High jump	2.08 m	Demberelsaichan Altansuch	30 June 1987		Ulaanbaatar, Mongolia	
Pole vault	3.80 m	Tserendesh Tsogtbaatar	12 July 1970		Ulaanbaatar, Mongolia	
Long jump	7.47 m (+1.9 m/s)	Khandsuren Tsastbaatar	21 August 1986		Irkutsk, Soviet Union	
Triple jump	14.60 m (+1.4 m/s)	Khandsuren Tsastbaatar	22 August 1986		Irkutsk, Soviet Union	
Shot put	17.80 m	Dashdendev Makhashiri	30 May 1998		Irkutsk, Russia	
Discus throw	60.14 m	Dashdendev Makhashiri	18 May 1997		Busan, South Korea	
Hammer throw	49.97 m	Dashdendev Makhashiri	21 July 2005		Ulaanbaatar, Mongolia	
Javelin throw						
Decathlon	5945 pts h	Dambo Damdinsuren	29–30 June 1971		Ulaanbaatar, Mongolia	
Decathlon	100m (wind) / Long jump (wind) / Shot put / High jump / 400m / 110m H (wind) / Discus / Pole vault / Javelin / 1500m; 11.1 / 6.23 m / 9.68 m / 1.70 m / 53.3 / 16.8 / 29.46 m / 3.50 m / 51.30 m / 4:39.2					
20 km walk (road)						
50 km walk (road)						
4 × 100 m relay	42.3 h	Mongolia	11 August 1990		Ulaanbaatar, Mongolia	
4 × 400 m relay	3:18.8 h	Mongolia	12 August 1990		Ulaanbaatar, Mongolia	

=== Women ===
Event	Record	Athlete	Date	Meet	Place	Ref.
100 m	12.26 (+0.1 m/s)	Jatansuren Otgonchineg	26 August 1991	World Championships	Tokyo, Japan	
200 m	24.52 (−0.3 m/s)	Munkhkherlen Tsoodol	10 July 2026	Asian U23 Championships	Ordos City, China	
400 m	54.97	Munkhkherlen Tsoodol	10 July 2026	Asian U23 Championships	Ordos City, China	
800 m	2:10.5 h	Chuluunkhuu Shinetsetseg	4 July 2009		Ulan-Ude, Russia	
1500 m	4:28.41	Chuluunkhuu Shinetsetseg	1 October 2023	Asian Games	Hangzhou, China	
3000 m	9:39.23	Bayartsogtyn Mönkhzayaa	3 August 2014		Irkutsk, Russia	
5000 m	16:11.10	Bayartsogtyn Mönkhzayaa	2 October 2014	Asian Games	Incheon, South Korea	
5 km (road)	16:46+	Khishigsaikhan Galbadrakh	2 March 2025	Tokyo Marathon	Tokyo, Japan	
10,000 m	33:24.79	Bayartsogtyn Mönkhzayaa	13 July 2023	Asian Championships	Bangkok, Thailand	
10 km (road)	33:26	Bayartsogtyn Mönkhzayaa	27 October 2024	Shanghai 10K Elite Race	Shanghai, China	
15 km (road)	50:21+	Khishigsaikhan Galbadrakh	19 November 2023	Ageo City Half Marathon	Ageo, Japan	
20 km (road)	1:07:02+	Khishigsaikhan Galbadrakh	19 November 2023	Ageo City Half Marathon	Ageo, Japan	
Half marathon	1:10:32	Khishigsaikhan Galbadrakh	19 November 2023	Ageo City Half Marathon	Ageo, Japan	
25 km (road)	1:26:49+	Khishigsaikhan Galbadrakh	17 December 2023	Taipei Marathon	Taipei, Taiwan	
30 km (road)	1:44:01+	Khishigsaikhan Galbadrakh	3 March 2024	Tokyo Marathon	Tokyo, Japan	
Marathon	2:24:45	Bayartsogtyn Mönkhzayaa	17 March 2024	Seoul International Marathon	Seoul, South Korea	
100 m hurdles	15.4 h (+1.3 m/s)	Batsuur Niamsouren	29 July 1972		Ulaanbaatar, Mongolia	
100 m hurdles	14.98 (+2.0 m/s)	Nomin-Od Ser-Od	16 March 2024	1st Sanda City Record Meeting	Miki, Japan	
400 m hurdles	1:04.0 h	Baatar Hurelceceg	22 August 1984		Ulaanbaatar, Mongolia	
3000 m steeplechase						
High jump	1.71 m	Damdinsuren Bolormaa	1 August 1992		Ulaanbaatar, Mongolia	
Pole vault						
Long jump	6.08 m (+0.7 m/s)	Baatarchu Odonchimeg	30 June 1987		Ulaanbaatar, Mongolia	
Triple jump	12.60 m NWI	Enkhbat Oyundari	17 September 2022	Mongolian Championships	Ulaanbaatar, Mongolia	
Shot put	14.68 m	Nanjilma Dashzeveg	16 July 1966		Ulaanbaatar, Mongolia	
Discus throw	54.90 m	Nanjilma Dashzeveg	13 May 1972		Ulaanbaatar, Mongolia	
Hammer throw	45.90 m	Purev Maamuu	21/22 July 2006		Ulaanbaatar, Mongolia	
Javelin throw	19.18 m	Byama Khoasbaatar	29 April 2011		Columbia, United States	
Heptathlon	4324 pts h	Davaashav Ganceceg	30–31 July 1988		Ulaanbaatar, Mongolia	
Heptathlon	100m H (wind) / High jump / Shot put / 200m (wind) / Long jump (wind) / Javelin / 800m; 16.0 / 1.53 m / 9.58 m / 26.9 / 4.90 m / 32.08 m / 2:26.8					
20 km walk (road)	1:45:09	Volooj Otgontuul	16 March 2008	Asian Race Walking Championships	Nomi, Japan	
50 km walk (road)						
4 × 100 m relay	50.2 h	Mongolia	20 August 1986		Irkutsk, Soviet Union	
4 × 400 m relay	3:52.33	Mongolia; Munkhtumen Otgonpurev; Batbold Solongo; Enkhbaatar Sarangua; Zuunnast Gankhishig	4 October 2023	Asian Games	Hangzhou, China	

== Indoor ==
=== Men ===
Event	Record	Athlete	Date	Meet	Place	Ref.
60 m	6.94	Tsagaan Odonbaiar	25 February 1989		Moscow, Soviet Union	
200 m	22.60	Tsendsuren Erdene-Munkh	26 February 1989		Moscow, Soviet Union	
400 m	49.23	Tsendsuren Erdene Munkh	24 February 1990		Moscow, Soviet Union	
600 m	1:39.54	Munkhorgil Tuvden			United States	
800 m	1:55.76	Puntsagsor Purevsuren	7 March 1997	World Championships	Paris, France	
1500 m	3:55.48	Narandulam Munkhbayar	15 February 2014	Asian Championships	Hangzhou, China	
3000 m	8:34.15	Narandulam Munkhbayar	15 February 2014	Asian Championships	Hangzhou, China	
55 m hurdles	8.47	Munkhorgil Tuvden			United States	
60 m hurdles	9.07	Munkhorgil Tuvden			United States	
High jump						
Pole vault						
Long jump	6.08 m	Sainbileg Tsasbayar	15 February 2014	Asian Championships	Hangzhou, China	
Triple jump						
Shot put						
Heptathlon						
Heptathlon	60m / Long jump / Shot put / High jump / 60m H / Pole vault / 1000m					
5000 m walk						
4 × 400 m relay						

=== Women ===
Event	Record	Athlete	Date	Meet	Place	Ref.
60 m	7.79	Munkhtumen Otgonpurev	7 February 2026	Asian Championships	Tianjin, China	
200 m						
400 m	56.40	Munkhtumen Otgonpurev	6 February 2026	Asian Championships	Tianjin, China	
800 m	2:15.45	Shinetsetseg Chuluunkhuu	31 October 2007	Asian Indoor Games	Macau	
1500 m	4:38.07	Chuluunkhuu Shinetsetseg	15 February 2014	Asian Championships	Hangzhou, China	
3000 m	10:03.69	Battsetseg Baatarkhuu	1 November 2007	Asian Indoor Games	Macau	
60 m hurdles						
High jump						
Pole vault						
Long jump						
Triple jump						
Shot put	12.22 m	Dulmaa Bazarsad	6 February 2026	Asian Championships	Tianjin, China	
Pentathlon						
Pentathlon	60m H / High jump / Shot put / Long jump / 800m					
3000 m walk						
4 × 400 m relay	3:54.87	Mongolia; Munguntuya Batgerel; Erdenebileg Ariuntungalag; Shinetsetseg Chuluunkhuu; Uyanga Ulziitumur	1 November 2007	Asian Indoor Games	Macau	
