= Hassan Saaid =

Maldivian sprinter (born 1992)

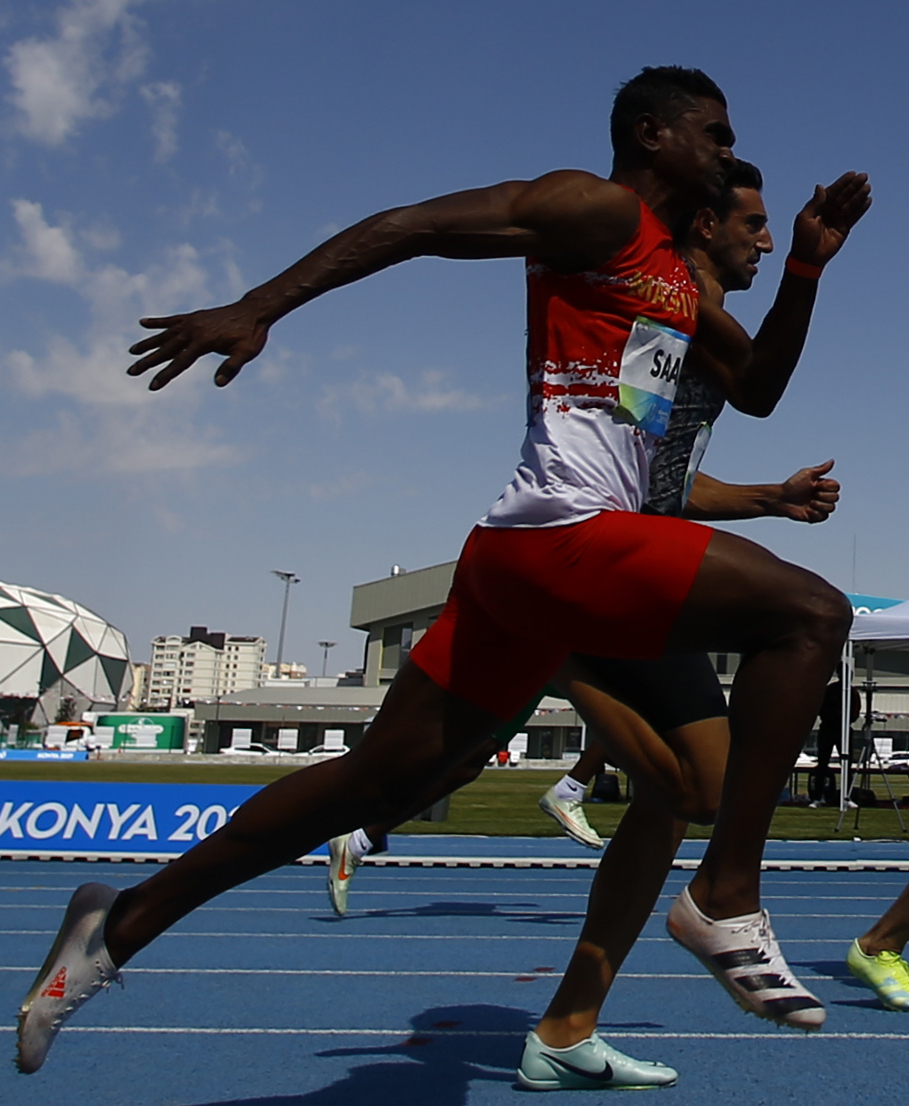
- Hassan Saaid in 2022

Personal information
- Native name: ޙަސަން ސާއިދު
- Nationality: Maldives
- Born: 4 March 1992 (age 34) Gaafaru, Maldives
- Height: 5 ft 2 in (157 cm)
- Weight: 60 kg (132 lb) (2014)

Sport
- Country: Maldives
- Sport: Athletics
- Event: Sprint
- Club: Dhivehi Sifainge Club
Medal record
Men's athletics
Representing Maldives
South Asian Games
Gold medal – first place	2019 Kathmandu	100 m
Silver medal – second place	2016 Guwahati	100 m
Silver medal – second place	2016 Guwahati	200 m
Bronze medal – third place	2010 Dhaka	4 × 100 m relay

Hassan Saaid (Dhivehi: ޙަސަން ސާއިދު; born 4 March 1992) is a Maldivian athlete specialising in the sprinting events. He represented his country at the 2010 and 2014 Commonwealth Games, as well as the 2010 and 2014 Asian Games.

He is the current national record holder in the 100, 200 and 400 metres, as well as the 4×100 metres relay.

He studied at the University of West Indies in Jamaica.

Saaid won his country's first ever South Asian Games gold medal (in the 100m event) at the 2019 edition held in Kathmandu, Nepal.

== Competition record ==
Year	Competition	Venue	Position	Event	Notes
Representing Maldives
2010	South Asian Games	Dhaka, Bangladesh	3rd	4 × 100 m relay	41.39
2010	Asian Junior Championships	Hanoi, Vietnam	18th (h)	200 m	22.77
2010	Asian Junior Championships	Hanoi, Vietnam	14th (h)	400 m	50.08
2010	Commonwealth Games	Delhi, India	33rd (h)	200 m	22.07
2010	Commonwealth Games	Delhi, India	27th (h)	400 m	48.56
2010	Asian Games	Guangzhou, China	19th (h)	200 m	22.16
2013	Asian Championships	Pune, India	9th (sf)	200 m	21.37
2014	Commonwealth Games	Glasgow, United Kingdom	42nd (h)	100 m	10.79
2014	Commonwealth Games	Glasgow, United Kingdom	40th (h)	200 m	21.38
2014	Asian Games	Incheon, South Korea	15th (sf)	100 m	10.59
2014	Asian Games	Incheon, South Korea	10th (sf)	200 m	21.62
2015	Asian Championships	Wuhan, China	12th (sf)	100 m	10.50
2015	Asian Championships	Wuhan, China	14th (sf)	200 m	21.19
2015	World Championships	Beijing, China	42nd (h)	100 m	10.42 NR
2016	South Asian Games	Guwahati, India	2nd	100 m	10.41
2016	South Asian Games	Guwahati, India	2nd	200 m	21.15
2016	Asian Indoor Championships	Doha, Qatar	5th	60 m	6.84
2016	Olympic Games	Rio de Janeiro, Brazil	58th (h)	100 m	10.47
2017	Islamic Solidarity Games	Baku, Azerbaijan	4th	100 m	10.42
2017	Islamic Solidarity Games	Baku, Azerbaijan	6th	200 m	21.23
2017	Asian Championships	Bhubaneswar, India	4th	100 m	10.37
2017	World Championships	London, United Kingdom	40th (h)	100 m	10.45
2018	Asian Games	Jakarta, Indonesia	19th (sf)	100 m	10.63
2019	Asian Championships	Doha, Qatar	17th (sf)	100 m	10.56
2019	Asian Championships	Doha, Qatar	11th (h)	4 × 100 m relay	41.80
2019	South Asian Games	Kathmandu, Nepal	1st	100 m	10.45
2019	South Asian Games	Kathmandu, Nepal	3rd	200 m	21.22
2021	Olympic Games	Tokyo, Japan	14th (p)	100 m	10.70
2022	World Indoor Championships	Belgrade, Serbia	38th (h)	60 m	6.87
2022	World Championships	Eugene, United States	54th (h)	100 m	10.83
2022	Islamic Solidarity Games	Konya, Turkey	31st (h)	100 m	10.60
2022	Islamic Solidarity Games	Konya, Turkey	24th (h)	200 m	21.69
2023	Asian Games	Hangzhou, China	32nd (h)	100 m	10.71
2023	Asian Games	Hangzhou, China	10th (h)	4 × 100 m relay	42.19
2024	Asian Indoor Championships	Tehran, Iran	22nd (h)	60 m	6.95
2024	World Indoor Championships	Glasgow, United Kingdom	37th (h)	60 m	6.93
2025	World Indoor Championships	Nanjing, China	49th (h)	60 m	7.05
2025	World Championships	Tokyo, Japan	55th (h)	100 m	10.81
2025	Islamic Solidarity Games	Riyadh, Saudi Arabia	18th (h)	100 m	11.18
2026	Asian Indoor Championships	Tianjin, China	31st (h)	60 m	7.05
2026	Commonwealth Games	Glasgow, United Kingdom	51st (h)	100 m	10.77
2026	Commonwealth Games	Glasgow, United Kingdom	48th (h)	200 m	22.10

== Personal bests ==
Outdoor

- 100 metres – 10.33 (+1.9 m/s) (Kingston 2016) NR
- 200 metres – 20.75 (+1.0 m/s) (Bangalore 2016) NR
- 400 metres – 47.48 (Kingston 2013) NR

Indoor

- 60 metres – 6.75 (Doha 2016) NR
