= Omar Juma Al-Salfa =

Emirati sprinter (born 1989)

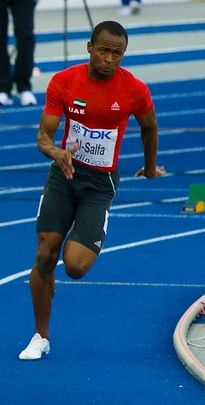
- Al-Salfai an Berlin (2009 year)

Personal information
- Born: 15 October 1989 (age 36)
Medal record
Men's athletics
Representing the United Arab Emirates
Asian Championships
Gold medal – first place	2009 Guangzhou	200 m
Asian Games
Bronze medal – third place	2010 Guangzhou	200 m
Asian Indoor Games
Bronze medal – third place	2009 Hanoi	4×400 m relay

Omar Jouma Bilal Al-Salfa, Arabic: عمر جمعة بلال السالفة, (born 15 October 1989) is a track and field athlete from the United Arab Emirates who competes in sprinting events. He was a gold medallist at the 2009 Asian Athletics Championships and represented his country at the 2008 Beijing Olympics.

== Career ==
He made his first appearances at major competitions in 2007: he took the bronze medal over 200 metres at the Military World Games in October and then came fourth at the Pan Arab Games with a national record-breaking run of 20.94 seconds. He turned to the indoor circuit at the start of the following season and came fourth at the 2008 Asian Indoor Athletics Championships with a national record of 6.81 seconds for the 60 metres. He was selected for the 2008 IAAF World Indoor Championships and ran in the heats.

Outdoors he set a national junior record of 10.53 seconds to take the 100 metres title at that year's Arab Junior Championships that, and also went on to win the 200 m gold medal. At the 2008 Asian Junior Athletics Championships he took the gold in the 200 m. He reached the 200 m final at the 2008 World Junior Championships in Athletics and gained a place on the Olympic team for the 2008 Summer Olympics, where he competed in the heats stage of the event.

He improved his 200 m record to 20.72 seconds with a win at the Gulf Championships in May 2009. He competed at the 2009 World Championships in Athletics and reached the quarter-finals on his debut appearance at the competition. A fourth-place finish over 60 m at the 2009 Asian Indoor Games (with a personal best of 6.72 seconds) was followed by a bronze medal with the Emirati team in the 4×400 metres relay. Al-Salfa won his first major senior title at the 2009 Asian Athletics Championships, just dipping ahead of Shinji Takahira of Japan to win the Asian 200 m title. In 2010 he made his first appearance on the IAAF Diamond League circuit running a wind-assisted 10.35 seconds in the 100 m at the Qatar Athletic Super Grand Prix in Doha. He claimed the 200 m bronze medal behind Nigerian-born Femi Ogunode and Japan's Kenji Fujimitsu at the 2010 Asian Games.

== Major competition record ==
Year	Competition	Venue	Position	Event	Notes
Representing United Arab Emirates
2007	Pan Arab Games	Cairo, Egypt	4th	200 m	20.94 (NR)
2008	Asian Indoor Championships	Doha, Qatar	4th	60 m	6.81
2008	World Indoor Championships	Valencia, Spain	28th (h)	60 m	6.88
2008	World Junior Championships	Bydgoszcz, Poland	7th	200 m	21.10 (wind: -0.9 m/s)
2008	Olympic Games	Beijing, China	40th (h)	200 m	21.00
2009	Asian Indoor Games	Hanoi, Vietnam	4th	60 m	6.72 (NR)
2009	World Championships	Berlin, Germany	25th (qf)	200 m	20.97
2009	Asian Championships	Guangzhou, China	1st	200 m	21.07
2010	West Asian Championships	Aleppo, Syria	2nd	200 m	21.11
2010	West Asian Championships	Aleppo, Syria	1st	4 × 100 m relay	40.07
2010	West Asian Championships	Aleppo, Syria	4th	4 × 400 m relay	3:15.44
2010	Asian Games	Guangzhou, China	3rd	200 m	20.83
2011	Asian Championships	Kobe, Japan	3rd	200 m	20.97
2011	World Championships	Daegu, South Korea	48th (h)	200 m	21.45
2011	Pan Arab Games	Doha, Qatar	5th	100 m	21.59
2011	Pan Arab Games	Doha, Qatar	3rd	4 × 100 m	40.15
2012	West Asian Championships	Dubai, United Arab Emirates	1st (h)	200 m	21.40
2012	West Asian Championships	Dubai, United Arab Emirates	1st	4 × 400 m relay	3:10.80
2016	Asian Indoor Championships	Doha, Qatar	26th (h)	60 m	7.11
2018	West Asian Championships	Amman, Jordan	7th (h)	200 m	21.75 (w)
