= Suppachai Chimdee =

Thai athletics competitor

Suppachai Chimdee (born 5 January 1991) is a retired Thai sprinter who specialized in the 200 and 400 metres.

In age-specific categories he won several medals. At the 2008 Asian Junior Championships he won a silver medal in the 4 × 100 metres relay and a gold medal in the 4 × 400 metres relay. At the 2010 Asian Junior Championships he won gold medals in the 200 metres, 4 × 100 and 4 × 400. At the 2008 World Junior Championships he competed in the 200 metres without progressing from the heat and finished eighth at the 2008 World Junior Championships. At the 2010 World Junior Championships he again competed in the 200 metres, reaching the semi-final, and finished sixth in the relay.

At the World Championships he competed in relay in 2009 and 2011 without reaching the final. The team was also disqualified in the final at the 2011 Summer Universiade, and later finished fourth at the 2013 Summer Universiade.

On the regional level he won several medals. At the 2009 Asian Indoor Games he won a silver medal in the 4 × 400 metres relay. At the 2009 Southeast Asian Games he won the bronze medal in the 200 metres and gold medals in the 4 × 100 and 4 × 400. At the 2009 Asian Championships he finished eighth in the 200 metres, fourth in the 4 × 100 and sixth in the 4 × 400. At the 2011 Southeast Asian Games he finished fifth in the 100 metres, fourth in the 4 × 100 and won silver medals in the 200 m and the 4 × 400 m. At the 2013 Southeast Asian Games he won a gold medal in the 4 × 100 m, finished fourth in the 200 m and competed in the 400 m. At the 2014 Asian Games he competed in the 200 m and 4 × 400 m without reaching the final.

His personal best times were 10.47 seconds in the 100 metres, achieved in June 2010 in Pune; 20.68 seconds in the 200 metres, achieved in March 2009 in Kanchanaburi; and 46.78 seconds in the 400 metres, achieved in December 2012 in Chiang Mai. His 200-metre time is the Thai record; he also co-holds the 4 × 400 metres national indoor record with 3:11.07 minutes at the 2009 Asian Indoor Games.
