= Farhan Ahmad =

Pakistani athlete (born 1994)

Personal information
- Nationality: Pakistani
- Born: 7 June 1994 (age 32)

Sport
- Sport: Track and field
- Event: 800 metres

Achievements and titles
- Personal best: 800 m: 1:50.14 (2011)

Farhan Ahmad (born 7 June 1994) is a Pakistani athlete. Ahmad was Pakistan's only representative at the 2011 World Championships held in South Korea, where he competed in the 800 metres. He achieved a personal best of 1:50.14 minutes at the competition.

Ahmad represented the Water and Power Development Authority athletics team in competition. He is coached by Salman Iqbal Butt.

He qualified for the finals of the 2014 Asian Indoor Championships 800 m, where he finished 6th.
