= Athletics at the 2013 SEA Games – Men's 400 metres =

The men's 400 metres at the 2013 SEA Games, was held in Naypyidaw, Myanmar. The track and field events took place at the Wunna Theikdi Stadium on December 15.

== Schedule ==
All times are Myanmar Standard Time (UTC+06:30)

Date	Time	Event
Sunday, 15 December 2013	10:30	Heats
Sunday, 15 December 2013	16:30	Final

== Records ==
Prior to this competition, the existing world, Asian, and Southeast Asian Games records were as follows.

World Record	Michael Johnson (USA)	43.18	Seville, Spain	26 August 1999
Asian Record	Mohamed Amer Al-Malky (OMA)	44.56	Budapest, Hungary	12 August 1988
Games Record	Aktawat Sakulchan (THA)	46.05	Chiang Mai, Thailand	10 December 1995

== Results ==
Legend

- DSQ — Disqualified
- DNF — Do Not Finish

=== Round 1 ===
==== Heat 1 ====
Rank	Lane	Athlete	Time	Notes
1	8	Archand Christian Bagsit (PHI)	47.83	
2	4	Mohamad Arif Zulhilmi Alet (MAS)	47.86	
3	7	Heru Astriyanto (INA)	48.06	
4	3	Trong Hinh Le (VIE)	48.31	
5	6	Suppachai Chimdee (THA)	48.56	
6	1	Guo Pei Loh (SIN)	50.67	
7	2	Kyaw Zin Aung (MYA)	51.00	
8	5	Samorn Kieng (CAM)	51.54	

==== Heat 2 ====
Rank	Lane	Athlete	Time	Notes
1	4	Edgardo Alejan Jr (PHI)	48.02	
2	3	Edy Ariansyah (INA)	48.05	
3	5	Srikharin Wannasa (THA)	48.21	
4	1	Kannanthasan Subramaniam (MAS)	48.49	
5	7	Zubin Percy Muncherji (SIN)	48.90	
6	8	Thet Zaw Win (MYA)	49.73	
7	6	Ak Hafiy Tajuddin Pg Rositi (BRU)	49.94	
—	2	Cong Lich Quach (VIE)	DNF	

=== Final ===
Rank	Lane	Athlete	Time	Notes
1st place, gold medalist(s)	3	Archand Christian Bagsit (PHI)	47.22	
2nd place, silver medalist(s)	6	Edgardo Alejan Jr (PHI)	47.45	
3rd place, bronze medalist(s)	5	Edy Ariansyah (INA)	47.78	
4	7	Srikharin Wannasa (THA)	47.83	
5	4	Mohamad Arif Zulhilmi Alet (MAS)	48.23	
6	8	Heru Astriyanto (INA)	48.75	
7	1	Kannanthasan Subramaniam (MAS)	48.85	
8	2	Trong Hinh Le (VIE)	49.22	
