= Battulgyn Achitbileg =

Mongolian sprinter (born 1986)

Personal information
- Born: 30 July 1986 (age 39) Dundgovi Province, Mongolia
- Education: Mongolian State University of Agriculture
- Height: 1.74 m (5 ft 9 in)
- Weight: 74 kg (163 lb)

Sport
- Sport: Athletics
- Event(s): 60 m, 100 m, 200 m

Battulgyn Achitbileg (Mongolian: Баттулгын Ачитбилэг; born 30 July 1986) is a Mongolian athlete who competes in the sprinting events. He represented his country at the 2012 World Indoor Championships in Istanbul.

He currently holds national records in the 100 and 200 metres.

== Competition record ==
| Year | Competition | Venue | Position | Event | Notes |
Representing Mongolia
| 2009 | Asian Championships | Guangzhou, China | 27th (h) | 100 m | 11.09 |
| 2009 | Asian Championships | Guangzhou, China | 22nd (h) | 200 m | 22.54 |
| 2011 | Asian Championships | Kobe, Japan | 23rd (h) | 100 m | 10.95 |
| 2011 | Asian Championships | Kobe, Japan | 15th (h) | 200 m | 21.82 |
| 2012 | Asian Indoor Championships | Hangzhou, China | – | 60 m | DQ |
| 2012 | World Indoor Championships | Istanbul, Turkey | 30th (h) | 60 m | 7.03 |
| 2013 | Universiade | Kazan, Russia | 23rd (qf) | 100 m | 10.73 |
| 2013 | Universiade | Kazan, Russia | 23rd (qf) | 200 m | 21.70 |
| 2014 | Asian Indoor Championships | Hangzhou, China | 16th (h) | 60 m | 7.01 |
| 2014 | Asian Games | Incheon, South Korea | 18th (h) | 100 m | 10.76 |
| 2014 | Asian Games | Incheon, South Korea | 19th (sf) | 200 m | 22.22 |
| 2015 | Asian Championships | Wuhan, China | 15th (sf) | 100 m | 10.65 |
| 2015 | Asian Championships | Wuhan, China | 26th (h) | 200 m | 22.09 |
| 2016 | Asian Indoor Championships | Doha, Qatar | 20th (h) | 60 m | 6.95 |

== Personal bests ==
Outdoor

- 100 metres – 10.62 (+1.2 m/s, Almaty 2016)
- 200 metres – 21.53 (+0.8 m/s, Incheon 2014)

Indoor

- 60 metres – 6.95 (Doha 2016)

At the 2014 National Championships, Achitbileg ran 100 meters events in 10.3, but the result was not ratified by the Mongolian Athletics Federation.

Trained sprinters with average ability run at a speed of 19.52 mph, running 100 meters in 11.3 seconds, 200 meters in 22.9 seconds, In this context, Achitbileg's personal best stands of 10.62 seconds and 21.53 seconds represent a significant achievement for sprinting in Mongolia, highlighting the country's developing presence in international athletics. Competing alongside leading global athletes, his performances highlighted the growing capability of Mongolian sprinters.
