= Hitoshi Saito (athlete) =

Japanese sprinter

Personal information
- Nationality: Japanese
- Born: 9 October 1986 (age 39) Tochigi, Japan
- Education: University of Tsukuba
- Height: 1.80 m (5 ft 11 in)
- Weight: 69 kg (152 lb)

Sport
- Country: Japan
- Sport: Track and field
- Event(s): 200 metres 4×100 metres relay

Achievements and titles
- Personal best(s): 100 m: 10.35 (Tokyo 2008); 200 m: 20.42 (Sapporo 2009)
Medal record
Men's athletics
Representing Japan
Asian Championships
Gold medal – first place	2011 Kobe	4×100 m relay
Silver medal – second place	2011 Kobe	200 m
Bronze medal – third place	2009 Guangzhou	200 m

Hitoshi Saito (齋藤 仁志, Saitō Hitoshi; born 9 October 1986 in Tochigi) is a Japanese retired track and field sprinter who specialized in the 200 metres.

== Career ==
Sato represented Japan at two consecutive World Championships, in 2009 and 2011. He was also the reserve relay member at the 2008 Summer Olympics, but was ultimately not selected to run.

== Personal bests ==
Event	Time (s)	Competition	Venue	Date	Notes
100 m	10.35 (wind: +0.1 m/s)	Kanto University Championships	Tokyo, Japan	18 May 2008	
100 m	10.30 (wind: +6.5 m/s)	Chūhei Nambu Memorial	Sapporo, Japan	15 July 2007	Wind-assisted
200 m	20.42 (wind: +1.3 m/s)	Japanese Championships	Hiroshima, Japan	26 June 2009	
200 m	20.37 (wind: +2.3 m/s)	Japanese Championships	kawasaki, Japan	26 June 2008	Wind-assisted

== International competition ==
Year	Competition	Venue	Position	Event	Time
Representing Japan
2007	Summer Universiade	Bangkok, Thailand	8th	200 m	21.34 (wind: +0.2 m/s)
2007	Summer Universiade	Bangkok, Thailand	5th	4×100 m relay	39.45 (relay leg: 2nd)
2007	Summer Universiade	Bangkok, Thailand	— (h)	4×400 m relay	DNS (relay leg: 3rd)
2009	Summer Universiade	Belgrade, Serbia	7th	200 m	22.22 (wind: +0.1 m/s)
2009	Summer Universiade	Belgrade, Serbia	— (h)	4×100 m relay	DQ (relay leg: 4th)
2009	World Championships	Berlin, Germany	47th (h)	200 m	21.38 (wind: -0.2 m/s)
2009	Asian Championships	Guangzhou, China	3rd	200 m	21.10 (wind: +0.6 m/s)
2011	Asian Championships	Kobe, Japan	2nd	200 m	20.75 (wind: -0.4 m/s)
2011	Asian Championships	Kobe, Japan	1st	4×100 m relay	39.18 (relay leg: 4th)
2011	World Championships	Daegu, South Korea	19th (sf)	200 m	21.17 (wind: -1.0 m/s)
2011	World Championships	Daegu, South Korea	9th (h)	4×100 m relay	38.66 (relay leg: 4th) SB
