= Robert Hering =

German sprinter (born 1990)

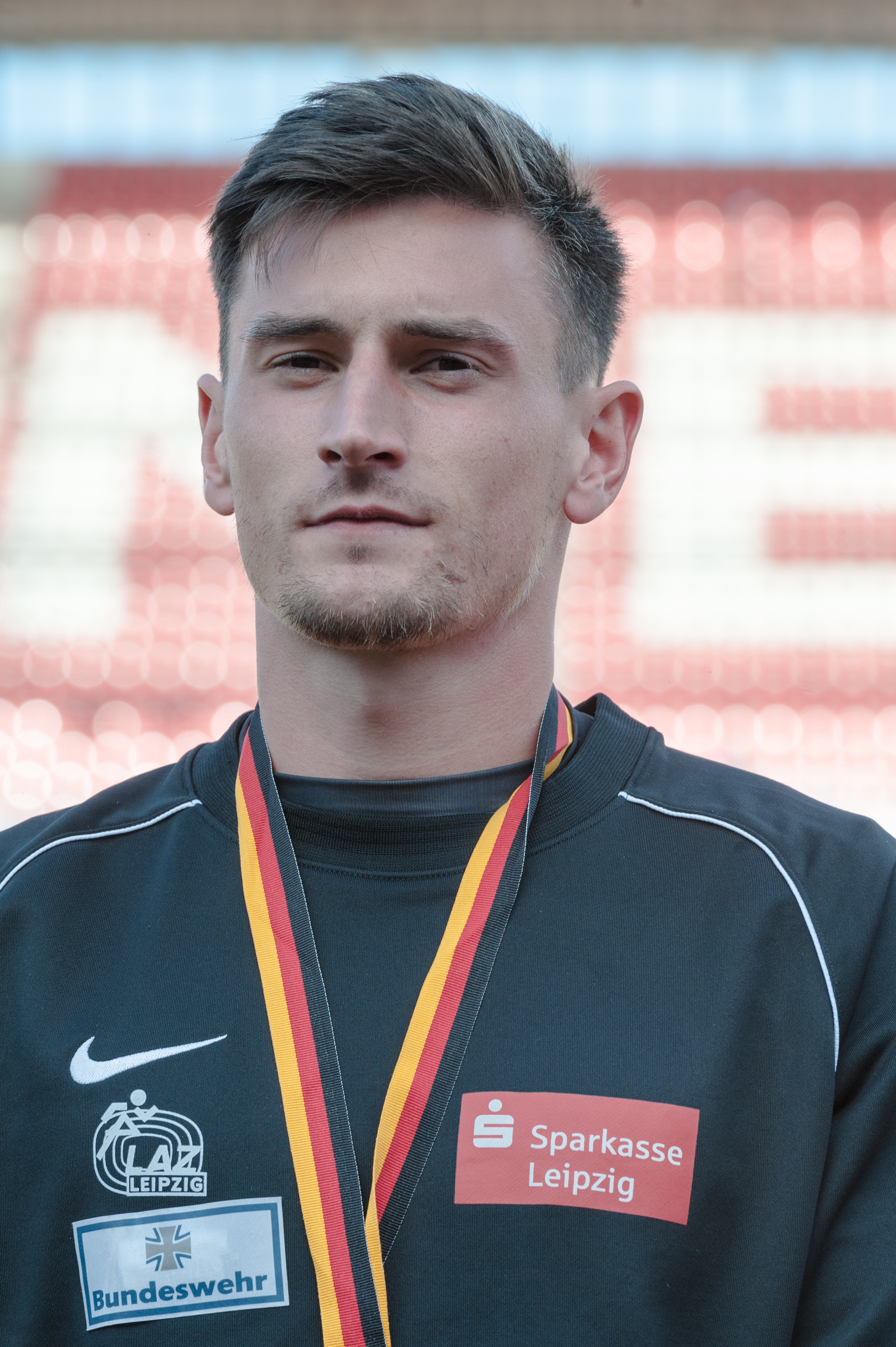
- Hering in 2015

Personal information
- Full name: Robert Hering
- Nationality: Germany
- Born: 14 June 1990 (age 36) Gera, East Germany
- Height: 1.82 m (6 ft 0 in)
- Weight: 78 kg (172 lb)

Sport
- Sport: Running
- Club: TuS Jena

Achievements and titles
- Personal bests: 100 m: 10.34 s (Mannheim, 2009); 200 m: 20.41 s (Ulm, 2009)
Medal record
Men's athletics
Representing Germany
World Junior Championships
Bronze medal – third place	2008 Bydgoszcz	200 m
European Junior Championships
Gold medal – first place	2007 Hengelo	4 × 100 m
Silver medal – second place	2009 Novi Sad	200 m

Robert Hering (born 14 June 1990 in Gera) is a German sprinter who specialises in the 200 metres. His personal best time is 20.41 seconds, achieved at the 2009 German Athletics Championships in Ulm, where he won gold. He competed at the 2016 Summer Olympics on Germany's 4 × 100 m relay team which finished 9th in the heats and did not advance to the final.

== See also ==
- German all-time top lists - 200 metres
