= Athletics at the 2014 Asian Games – Men's 200 metres =

Men's 200 metres at the 2014 Asian Games
- Venue: Incheon Asiad Main Stadium
- Dates: 30 September – 1 October 2014
- Competitors: 36 from 23 nations

Medalists
gold medal	Femi Ogunode	Qatar
silver medal	Fahhad Al-Subaie	Saudi Arabia
bronze medal	Yeo Ho-sua	South Korea

The men's 200 metres event at the 2014 Asian Games was held at the Incheon Asiad Main Stadium, Incheon, South Korea on 30 September – 1 October.

== Schedule ==
All times are Korea Standard Time (UTC+09:00)

Date	Time	Event
Tuesday, 30 September 2014	19:40	Round 1
Wednesday, 1 October 2014	09:45	Semifinals
Wednesday, 1 October 2014	20:00	Final

== Records ==
Prior to this competition, the existing world, Asian and Games records were as follows.

World Record	Usain Bolt (JAM)	19.19	Berlin, Germany	20 August 2009
Asian Record	Shingo Suetsugu (JPN)	20.03	Yokohama, Japan	7 June 2003
Games Record	Koji Ito (JPN)	20.25	Bangkok, Thailand	18 December 1998

== Results ==
Legend

- DNF — Did not finish
- DNS — Did not start
- DSQ — Disqualified

=== Round 1 ===
- Qualification: First 4 in each heat (Q) and the next 4 fastest (q) advance to the semifinals.

==== Heat 1 ====
- Wind: +0.2 m/s

Rank	Athlete	Time	Notes
1	Shota Hara (JPN)	20.76	Q
2	Barakat Al-Harthi (OMA)	21.26	Q
3	Naser Esmaeil (KUW)	21.59	Q
4	Naqib Asmin (SIN)	21.78	Q
5	Hasanain Hussein (IRQ)	21.86	q
6	Yam Sajan Sunar (NEP)	22.36	
—	Abbas Abubakar Abbas (BRN)	DNS	

==== Heat 2 ====
- Wind: +1.1 m/s

Rank	Athlete	Time	Notes
1	Xie Zhenye (CHN)	20.74	Q
2	Fahhad Al-Subaie (KSA)	20.85	Q
3	Mohammad Hossein Abareghi (IRI)	20.89	Q
4	Hassan Saaid (MDV)	21.31	Q
5	Lee Cheng Wei (SIN)	21.57	q
6	Suppachai Chimdee (THA)	21.78	q
7	Tilak Ram Tharu (NEP)	22.22	

==== Heat 3 ====
- Wind: +1.6 m/s

Rank	Athlete	Time	Notes
1	Zhang Peimeng (CHN)	20.77	Q
2	Yeo Ho-sua (KOR)	20.82	Q
3	Omirserik Bekenov (KAZ)	21.59	Q
4	Tang Yik Chun (HKG)	21.87	Q
5	Davron Atabaev (TJK)	21.91	
6	Mohammad Sayed Sahel (AFG)	23.44	
7	Lhaba Tshering (BHU)	24.18	
—	Yahya Al-Noufali (OMA)	DSQ	

==== Heat 4 ====
- Wind: +1.2 m/s

Rank	Athlete	Time	Notes
1	Shota Iizuka (JPN)	20.94	Q
2	Hassan Taftian (IRI)	21.39	Q
3	Mohammed Hasan (IRQ)	21.42	Q
4	Eid Abdulla Al-Kuwari (QAT)	21.68	Q
5	Hussain Inaas (MDV)	22.66	
6	Nasanjargalyn Enkhtör (MGL)	23.19	
—	Cho Kyu-won (KOR)	DNF	

==== Heat 5 ====
- Wind: +0.8 m/s

Rank	Athlete	Time	Notes
1	Femi Ogunode (QAT)	20.85	Q
2	Yang Chun-han (TPE)	21.28	Q
3	Ng Ka Fung (HKG)	21.34	Q
4	Battulgyn Achitbileg (MGL)	21.53	Q
5	Aleksandr Pronzhenko (TJK)	21.86	q
6	Abbos Toshmatov (UZB)	22.05	
7	Lao Iong (MAC)	22.35	

=== Semifinals ===
- Qualification: First 2 in each heat (Q) and the next 2 fastest (q) advance to the final.

==== Heat 1 ====
- Wind: 0.0 m/s

Rank	Athlete	Time	Notes
1	Shota Iizuka (JPN)	21.26	Q
2	Hassan Taftian (IRI)	21.49	Q
3	Hassan Saaid (MDV)	21.62	
4	Yang Chun-han (TPE)	21.64	
5	Lee Cheng Wei (SIN)	22.17	
6	Omirserik Bekenov (KAZ)	22.20	
7	Zhang Peimeng (CHN)	22.74	
—	Suppachai Chimdee (THA)	DNS	

==== Heat 2 ====
- Wind: 0.0 m/s

Rank	Athlete	Time	Notes
1	Yeo Ho-sua (KOR)	21.18	Q
2	Fahhad Al-Subaie (KSA)	21.24	Q
3	Ng Ka Fung (HKG)	21.59	
4	Mohammed Hasan (IRQ)	21.81	
5	Eid Abdulla Al-Kuwari (QAT)	21.88	
6	Naqib Asmin (SIN)	22.15	
7	Aleksandr Pronzhenko (TJK)	22.35	
—	Xie Zhenye (CHN)	DSQ	

==== Heat 3 ====
- Wind: 0.0 m/s

Rank	Athlete	Time	Notes
1	Femi Ogunode (QAT)	20.86	Q
2	Shota Hara (JPN)	21.25	Q
3	Mohammad Hossein Abareghi (IRI)	21.33	q
4	Barakat Al-Harthi (OMA)	21.45	q
5	Naser Al-Esmaeil (KUW)	21.89	
6	Tang Yik Chun (HKG)	22.03	
7	Battulgyn Achitbileg (MGL)	22.22	
—	Hasanain Hussein (IRQ)	DSQ	

=== Final ===
- Wind: +0.3 m/s

Rank	Athlete	Time	Notes
1st place, gold medalist(s)	Femi Ogunode (QAT)	20.14	GR
2nd place, silver medalist(s)	Fahhad Al-Subaie (KSA)	20.74	
3rd place, bronze medalist(s)	Yeo Ho-sua (KOR)	20.82	
4	Shota Iizuka (JPN)	20.87	
5	Shota Hara (JPN)	20.89	
6	Mohammad Hossein Abareghi (IRI)	21.07	
7	Barakat Al-Harthi (OMA)	21.17	
8	Hassan Taftian (IRI)	21.24	
