= Vyacheslav Muravyev =

Kazakhstani sprinter (born 1982)

Medal record

Men's athletics

Representing Kazakhstan

Asian Indoor Championships
Bronze medal – third place	2006 Pattaya	60 m
Bronze medal – third place	2008 Doha	60 m

Vyacheslav Olegovich Muravyev (Russian: Вячеслав Олегович Муравьев; born 14 July 1982 in Karaganda) is a Kazakhstani sprinter who specializes in the 100 and 200 metres.

He competed in the 60 metres at the 2006 World Indoor Championships, and finished eighth in the 100 metres at the 2006 Asian Games. He then competed in the 200 metres event at the 2008 Olympic Games and 2012 Olympic Games without reaching the final round.

His personal best 100 metres time is 10.33 seconds, achieved in May 2012 in Almaty. He has 20.63 seconds in the 200 metres, achieved in May 2012 also in Almaty; and 6.67 seconds in the 60 metres, achieved in February 2006 in Pattaya.

== Competition record ==
Year	Competition	Venue	Position	Event	Notes
Representing Kazakhstan
1999	World Youth Championships	Bydgoszcz, Poland	50th (h)	100 m	11.49
1999	World Youth Championships	Bydgoszcz, Poland	43rd (h)	200 m	23.01
2005	Asian Championships	Incheon, South Korea	6th (sf)	100 m	10.55
2005	Asian Championships	Incheon, South Korea	9th (h)	4 × 100 m relay	40.48
2006	Asian Indoor Championships	Pattaya, Thailand	3rd	60 m	6.67
2006	World Indoor Championships	Moscow, Russia	32nd (h)	60 m	6.80
2006	Asian Games	Doha, Qatar	8th	100 m	10.63
2008	Asian Indoor Championships	Doha, Qatar	3rd	60 m	6.79
2008	Olympic Games	Beijing, China	56th (h)	200 m	21.68
2009	World Championships	Berlin, Germany	52nd (h)	200 m	21.48
2010	Asian Indoor Championships	Tehran, Iran	7th	60 m	6.86
2010	Asian Games	Guangzhou, China	12th (h)	200 m	21.47
2011	Asian Championships	Kobe, Japan	11th (h)	200 m	21.53
2012	Olympic Games	London, United Kingdom	50th (h)	200 m	21.75
