= Femi Ogunode =

Nigerian-born Qatari sprint athlete (born 1991)

Femi Seun Ogunode
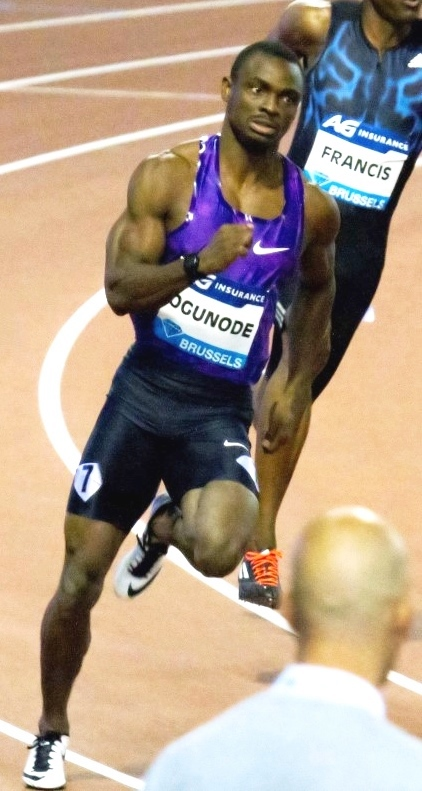
- Ogunode at the 2015 Memorial Van Damme

Personal information
- Nationality: Qatari
- Born: 15 May 1991 (age 35) Ondo Town, Nigeria
- Height: 1.85 m (6 ft 1 in)
- Weight: 73 kg (161 lb) (2022)
- Spouse: Kemi Ogunode

Sport
- Sport: Track and Field
- Event: Sprints

Achievements and titles
- Personal bests: 100m: 9.91 (Wuhan 2015), 200m: 19.97 (Brussels 2015), 400m: 45.12 (Guangzhou 2010).
Medal record
Representing Qatar
World Indoor Championships
Bronze medal – third place	2014 Sopot	60 m
Asian Games
Gold medal – first place	2010 Guangzhou	200 m
Gold medal – first place	2010 Guangzhou	400 m
Gold medal – first place	2014 Incheon	100 m
Gold medal – first place	2014 Incheon	200 m
Asian Athletics Championships
Gold medal – first place	2011 Kobe	200 m
Gold medal – first place	2015 Wuhan	100 m
Gold medal – first place	2015 Wuhan	200 m
Gold medal – first place	2015 Wuhan	4×400 m relay
Silver medal – second place	2017 Bhubaneswar	100 m
Bronze medal – third place	2017 Bhubaneswar	200 m
Asian Indoor Championships
Silver medal – second place	2014 Hangzhou	60 m
Silver medal – second place	2023 Astana	4×400 m relay
West Asian Athletics Championships
Gold medal – first place	2010 Aleppo	100 m
Gold medal – first place	2010 Aleppo	200 m
Pan Arab Games
Gold medal – first place	2011 Doha	100 m
Silver medal – second place	2011 Doha	200 m
Arab Championships
Gold medal – first place	2011 Al Ain	200 m
Gold medal – first place	2015 Manama	100 m
Gold medal – first place	2015 Manama	200 m
Gold medal – first place	2021 Radès	100 m
Gold medal – first place	2021 Radès	200 m
Bronze medal – third place	2011 Al Ain	100 m
Representing Asia-Pacific
Continental Cup
Bronze medal – third place	2014 Marrakesh	100 m
Bronze medal – third place	2014 Marrakesh	200 m

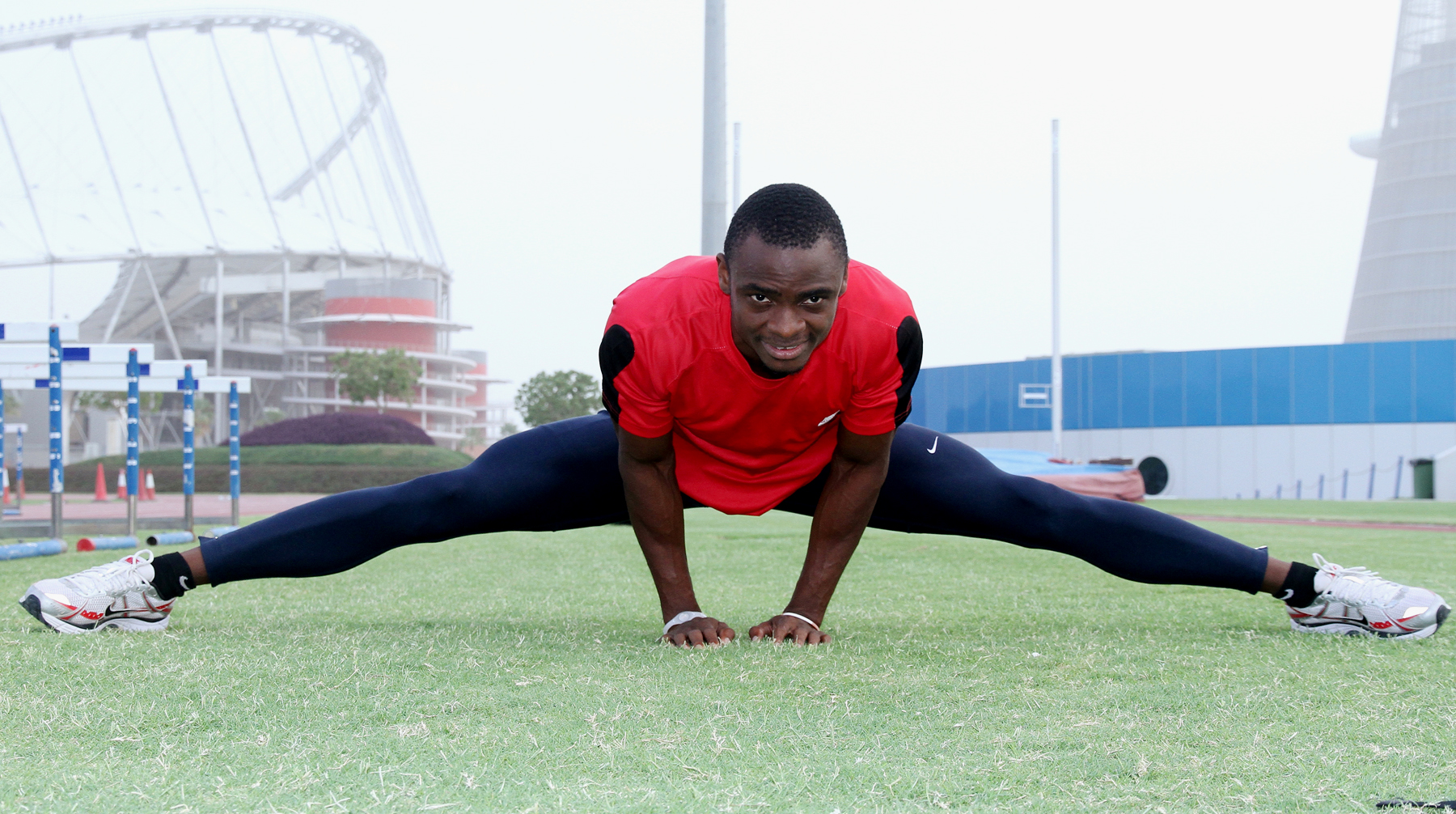
Ogunode in 2011

Femi Seun Ogunode (born 15 May 1991) is a Nigerian-born sprint athlete who competes internationally for Qatar since 2010. His personal best of 9.91 at the 100 m in 2015 made him the former holder of the Asian 100 m record, which was tied by China's Su Bingtian in 2018 and surpassed in 2021 at the 2020 Summer Olympics.

Ogunode made his international debut for Qatar at the 2010 Asian Games and won a 200 metres/400 metres double. The following year he won Asian and Arab titles over 200 m as well as the 100 metres/200 meter sprint titles at the 2011 Military World Games. He was a finalist in the 400 m at the 2011 World Championships in Athletics.

He won his second career double at the Asian Games in 2014, this time in the 100 m/200 m, and set an Asian record of 9.93 seconds for the former event (the second Asian man to break the 10-second barrier after fellow Qatari-Nigerian Samuel Francis). He also won bronze medals that year at the 2014 IAAF World Indoor Championships and 2014 IAAF Continental Cup.

== Career ==
In Nigeria, Ogunode ran for University of Ibadan and qualified for the 2007 All-Africa Games and the 2008 Summer Olympics. However, the Athletics Federation of Nigeria left him off of the final rosters for both events for undisclosed reasons. Following these slights, Ogunode accepted an offer to compete internationally for Qatar.

He moved to Qatar in October 2009 and began international competition the following year. He won the 100 metres and 200 metres at the West Asian Championships and was entered into the 2010 Asian Games. At the Games in Guangzhou he took two gold medals, winning over 200 m and 400 metres with personal bests of 20.43 seconds and 45.12 seconds, respectively. This made him only the second athlete in Games history to have won both events at the same competition – Milkha Singh first achieved this at the 1958 Asian Games.

He became the Asian champion in 200 metres, at Kobe, Japan. He equalled the Championships record (20.41 s) en route to gold. He then did even better at the Military World Games in Rio de Janeiro, Brazil, when he completed a 100 metres and 200 metres double. He set new championship marks over both distances (10.07 and 20.46).

In September 2014 he won the 100 m event at the Asian Games setting a new Asian record at 9.93 s. He also won the 200 m gold at Incheon. He set a further Asian record at the 2015 Asian Athletics Championships by winning the 100 m in a time of 9.91 seconds, having already broken the championship record with a run of 9.97 seconds in the semi-finals.

On 28 May 2021, he run his seasonal best of 10.00 s at Suhaim bin Hamad Stadium, Doha, winning the 100 m race of this Diamond League meeting and obtaining the standard for the 2020 Olympic Games.

== Personal life ==
His name Femi is a Yoruba name pronounced "F-eh-mi". He was born in Ondo State, Nigeria. His parents are TSB Ogunode and Adesola Ogunode. He is married to Kemi Adebayo. They have three children, Nathan Ogunode, Adriel Ogunode and Reina Ogunode. His younger brother, Tosin Ogunode, is also a sprinter for Qatar. He has 7 siblings.

Ogunode's father, T S B Ogunode, was a boxer and his mother, Adesola Ogunode, was a sprinter. Before focusing on running, Ogunode boxed and played football. He was a successful youth boxer and competed in state-level championships.

== International competitions ==
Year	Competition	Venue	Position	Event	Notes
2010	West Asian Championships	Aleppo, Syria	1st	100 m	10.21
2010	West Asian Championships	Aleppo, Syria	1st	200 m	20.98
2010	Asian Games	Guangzhou, China	1st	200 m	20.43
2010	Asian Games	Guangzhou, China	1st	400 m	45.12
2011	Asian Championships	Kobe, Japan	1st	200 m	20.41 CR
2011	Military World Games	Rio de Janeiro, Brazil	1st	100 m	10.07 GR
2011	Military World Games	Rio de Janeiro, Brazil	1st	200 m	20.46 GR
2011	World Championships	Daegu, South Korea	9th (sf)	200 m	20.58
2011	World Championships	Daegu, South Korea	8th	400 m	45.55
2011	Arab Championships	Al Ain, United Arab Emirates	3rd	100 m	10.37
2011	Arab Championships	Al Ain, United Arab Emirates	1st	200 m	20.59
2011	Arab Championships	Al Ain, United Arab Emirates	3rd	4 × 100 m relay	40.13
2011	Pan Arab Games	Doha, Qatar	1st	100 m	10.37
2011	Pan Arab Games	Doha, Qatar	2nd	200 m	21.01
2014	Asian Indoor Championships	Hangzhou, China	2nd	60 m	6.62
2014	World Indoor Championships	Sopot, Poland	3rd	60 m	6.52
2014	Continental Cup	Marrakesh, Morocco	3rd	100 m	10.04
2014	Continental Cup	Marrakesh, Morocco	3rd	200 m	20.17
2014	Asian Games	Incheon, South Korea	1st	100 m	9.93 AR GR
2014	Asian Games	Incheon, South Korea	1st	200 m	20.14 GR
2015	Arab Championships	Isa Town, Bahrain	1st	100 m	10.04w
2015	Arab Championships	Isa Town, Bahrain	1st	200 m	20.52w
2015	Asian Championships	Wuhan, China	1st	100 m	9.91AR CR
2015	Asian Championships	Wuhan, China	1st	200 m	20.32
2015	Asian Championships	Wuhan, China	1st	4 × 400 m relay	3:02.50 CR
2015	World Championships	Beijing, China	10th (sf)	100 m	10.00
2015	World Championships	Beijing, China	7th	200 m	20.27
2016	Olympic Games	Rio de Janeiro, Brazil	37th (h)	100 m	10.28
2016	Olympic Games	Rio de Janeiro, Brazil	23rd (h)	200 m	20.36
2017	Asian Championships	Bhubaneswar, India	2nd	100 m	10.26
2017	Asian Championships	Bhubaneswar, India	3rd	200 m	20.79
2022	World Indoor Championships	Belgrade, Serbia	8th (sf)	60 m	6.60
2022	World Championships	Eugene, United States	48th (h)	100 m	10.52
2023	Asian Indoor Championships	Astana, Kazakhstan	4th	60 m	6.67
2023	Asian Indoor Championships	Astana, Kazakhstan	2nd	4 × 400 m relay	3:09.26
2023	West Asian Championships	Doha, Qatar	1st	100 m	10.13
2023	West Asian Championships	Doha, Qatar	1st	200 m	20.70
2023	Arab Championships	Marrakesh, Morocco	1st	100 m	10.19
2023	Arab Championships	Marrakesh, Morocco	1st	200 m	20.52
2023	Asian Championships	Bangkok, Thailand	4th	100 m	10.25
2023	Asian Championships	Bangkok, Thailand	8th	200 m	29.03
2023	Asian Games	Hangzhou, China	16th (sf)	100 m	10.40
2023	Asian Games	Hangzhou, China	4th	200 m	20.75
2024	Asian Indoor Championships	Tehran, Iran	5th	60 m	6.69

Records
Preceded by (Qatar) Samuel Francis	Men's 100 m Asian record holder 28 September 2014 – 22 June 2018	Succeeded by (China) Su Bingtian
Records
Preceded by (Japan) Shingo Suetsugu	Men's 200 m Asian record holder 11 September 2015 – 21 July 2019	Succeeded by (China) Xie Zhenye
