= Shehan Ambepitiya =

Sri Lankan sprinter

Shehan Sandaruwan Abeyptiya
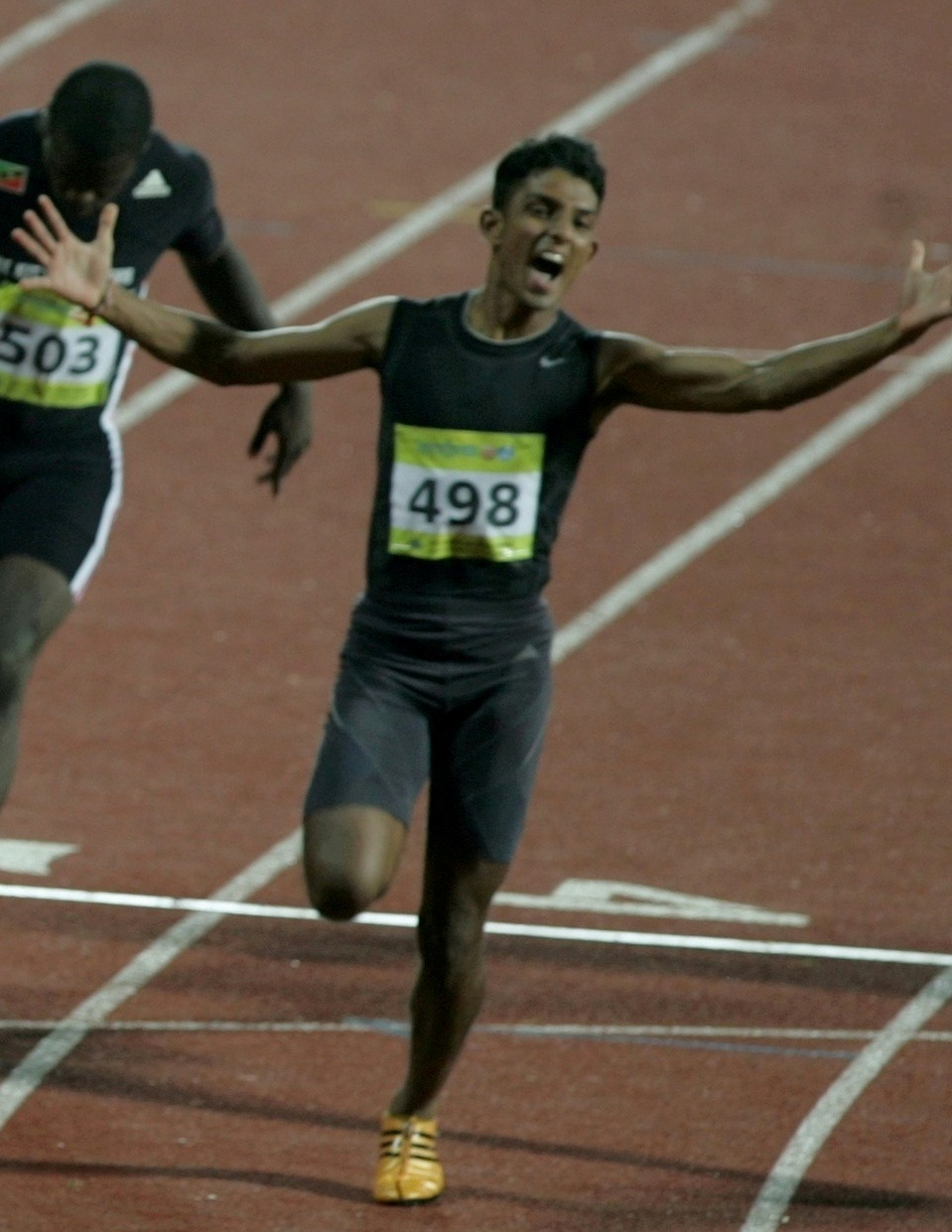
- Ambeypitiya at the Commonwealth Youth Games, Pune, 2008

Personal information
- Full name: Shehan Sandaruwan Abeyptiya
- Nationality: Sri Lanka
- Born: 17 January 1990 (age 36)
Medal record
Representing Sri Lanka
Athletics
Gold medal – first place	2008 Pune	100 metres
Gold medal – first place	2008 Pune	200 metres
Gold medal – first place	2008 Pune	4 x 100 metres
Gold medal – first place	2010 Dhaka	100 metres
Gold medal – first place	2010 Dhaka	4 x 100 metres
Gold medal – first place	2016 Guwahati	4 x 100 metres
Silver medal – second place	2010 Dhaka	200 metres
Silver medal – second place	2008 Jakarta	100 metres

Shehan Sadaruwan Ambepitiya (born 17 January 1990), known as Shehan Abeyptiya, is a Sri Lankan male athlete who won 3 gold medals at the 2008 Commonwealth Youth Games.

He also competed at the 2010 Commonwealth Games, making the semi-finals in the 100 and 200 metre events. He was also a finalist in the World Junior Championship in 2007. Ambepitiya further represented Sri Lanka at the 2009 World Athletics Championship, 2010 Commonwealth Games, 2010 South Asian Games, the Asian Junior Athletics Championships. In the Commonwealth Youth Games he won 3 Gold medals with 3 new games records. He was the first ever Sri Lankan to be a finalist in a World Junior Athletics Championships 2008. Also as a junior athlete he won the Asian Junior Silver medal for the 100m in the 2008.

Ambepitiya, considered as the fastest man in South Asia by winning the gold medal for the 100m in the South Asian Games 2010, Dakah, made a strong start to the 2010 athletics season, recording a personal best timing of 10.31 seconds for 100m and 21.10 seconds in 2011 Asian Athletics Championships for his 200m. Ambepitiya who trained under coach Sunil Gunawardena in Sri Lanka, subsequently trained in Jamaica under coach Glean Mills, the trainer of Usain Bolt and the world champion Yohan Blake.

Shehan Ambepitiya studied in President's College, Kotte and Gateway College Colombo, and had contributed immensely to the schools athletic championships.
