= Samuel Francis (sprinter) =

Nigerian-born Qatari sprinter

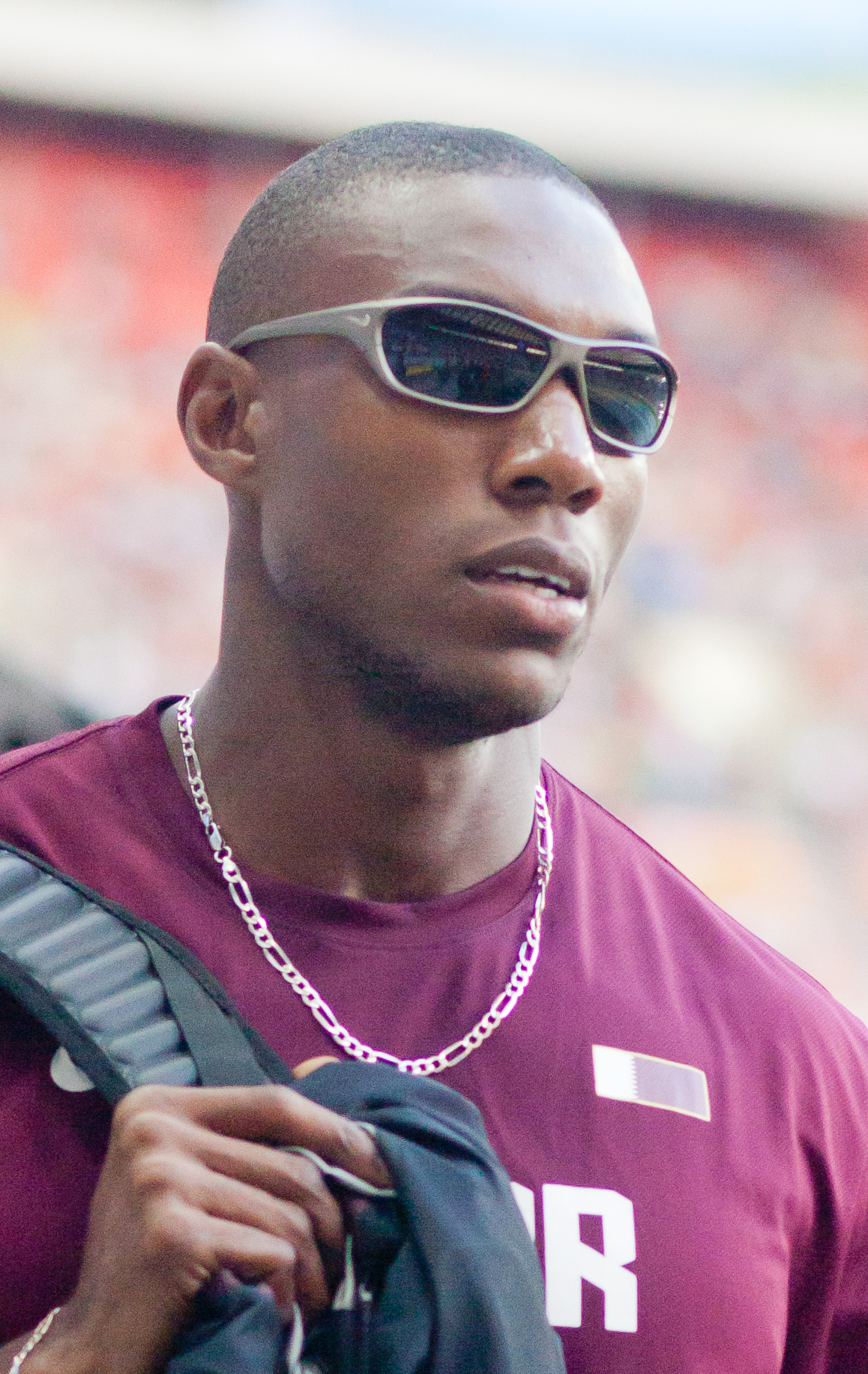
- Francis at the 2013 World Championships

Personal information
- Full name: Samuel Adelebari Francis
- Born: 27 March 1987 (age 39) Port Harcourt, Nigeria

Sport
- Sport: Running
- Event: Sprints

Achievements and titles
- Personal bests: 100 m: 9.99 s (Amman 2007); 200 m: 20.61 s (Sofia 2008)
Medal record
Men's athletics
Representing Qatar
Asian Championships
Gold medal – first place	Amman 2007	100 m
Silver medal – second place	Amman 2007	4×100 m
Asian Indoor Games
Gold medal – first place	Macau 2007	60 m
Asian Indoor Championships
Gold medal – first place	Doha 2008	60 m
Gold medal – first place	Tehran 2010	60 m
Gold medal – first place	Hangzhou 2014	60 m

Samuel Adelebari Francis (born 27 March 1987 in Port Harcourt) is a sprinter who specializes in the 100 metres. He was born in Port Harcourt, the capital of Rivers State, Nigeria. He is a naturalized Qatari and has competed for Qatar from July 2007. His personal best of 9.99 seconds is the former Asian record for the 100 m.

At the 2007 Asian Championships he first set a new championship record of 10.18 seconds during the heats. In the final he ran in a new Asian record, breaking the 10-second barrier with a time of 9.99 seconds, bettering Koji Ito's mark of 10.00 seconds at the 1998 Asian Games. He also went on to win the silver medal as part of the 4×100 metres relay team for Qatar. At the 2007 World Championships held one month later, his goal was to reach the final. He did not finish the race, however, exiting in the first round.

At the 2008 Olympic Games he competed at the 100 metres sprint. He also was scheduled to compete in the 200 metres sprint but did not start. However, retesting of his blood samples from the game showed he had used stanozolol, and all his results from the games were disqualified.

He ran at the next major championships, the 2009 World Championships in Athletics, but though he ran one of the fastest times of the first round, he was knocked out at the quarter-finals stage.

Francis has also competed indoors over 60 metres. At the 2007 Asian Indoor Games he won with a Games record time of 6.54 seconds. The following year at the 2008 Asian Indoor Athletics Championships he also won in championship record time. He competed at the 2009 Asian Indoor Games, but withdrew from the final due to injury, also missing the 2009 Asian Athletics Championships as a result. He rebounded soon after, winning another gold at the 2010 Asian Indoor Athletics Championships in February and improving his own championship record to 6.58 seconds.

== Personal bests ==
Event	Time (sec)	Venue	Date
60 metres	6.54	Macau, China	30 October 2007
100 metres	9.99 AR	Amman, Jordan	26 July 2007
200 metres	20.61	Sofia, Bulgaria	30 June 2008

- All information taken from IAAF athlete profile.
