= 2017 Asian Athletics Championships – Men's 200 metres =

The men's 200 metres at the 2017 Asian Athletics Championships was held on 6 and 7 July.

== Medalists ==
Gold	Yang Chun-han; Chinese Taipei
Silver	Park Bong-go; South Korea
Bronze	Femi Ogunode; Qatar

== Results ==
=== Heats ===
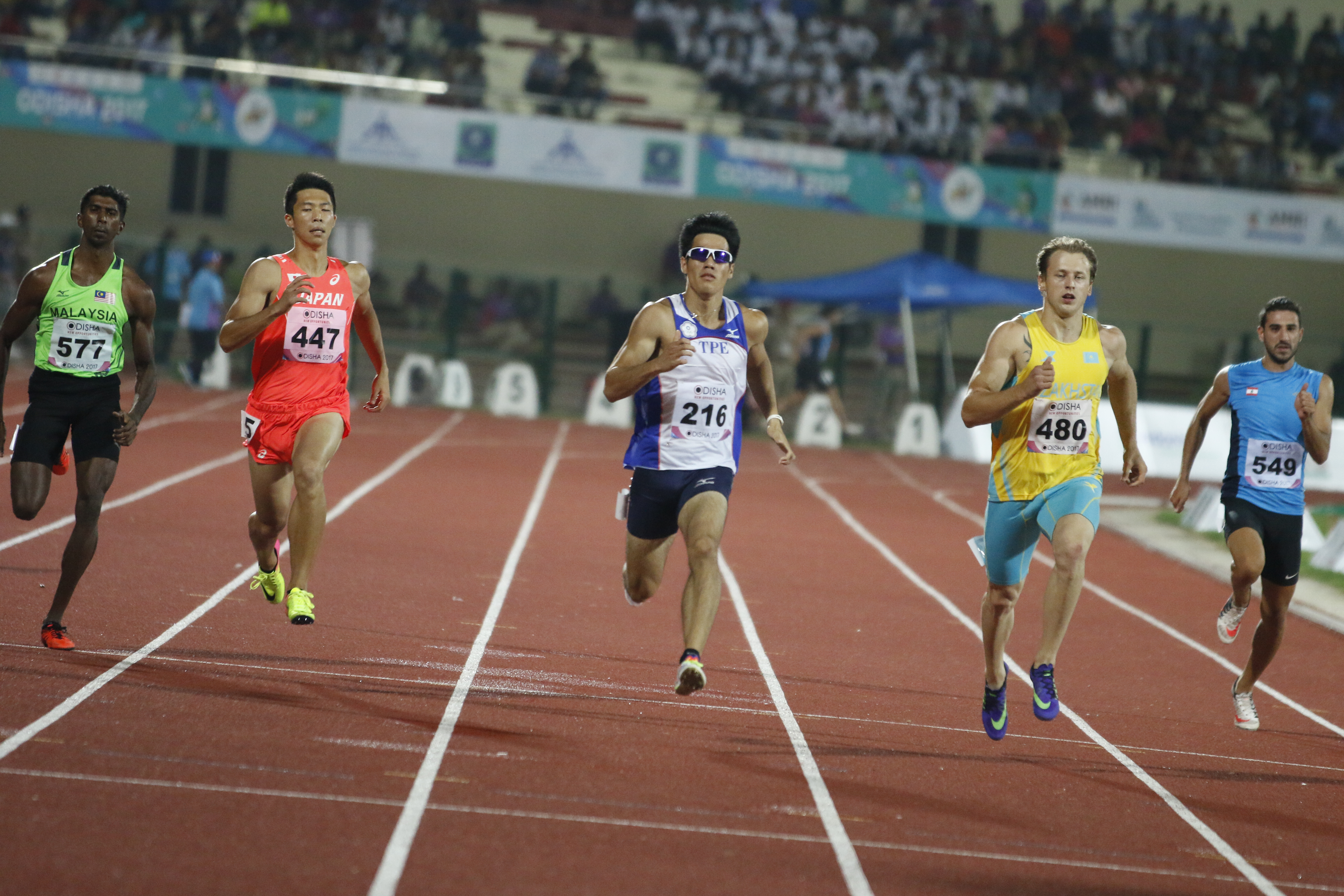
Heat 2

Qualification rule: First 3 in each heat (Q) and the next 4 fastest (q) qualified for the semifinals.

Wind:
Heat 1: +1.0 m/s, Heat 2: +0.3 m/s, Heat 3: -0.2 m/s, Heat 4: -0.3 m/s

Rank	Heat	Name	Nationality	Time	Notes
1	4	Femi Ogunode	Qatar	20.79	Q
2	2	Yang Chun-han	Chinese Taipei	20.90	Q
3	1	Bie Ge	China	20.92	Q
4	1	Park Bong-go	South Korea	20.97	Q
5	1	Trenten Anthony Beram	Philippines	21.05	Q
6	4	Ahmed Esam	Iraq	21.06	Q
7	2	Vladislav Grigoryev	Kazakhstan	21.10	Q
8	3	Lee Jae-ha	South Korea	21.18	Q
8	4	Hassan Taftian	Iran	21.18	Q
10	2	Kotaro Taniguchi	Japan	21.27	Q
11	4	Vinoj Suranjaya De Silva	Sri Lanka	21.29	q
12	3	Amiya Kumar Mallick	India	21.30	Q
13	2	Aravinn Thevarr	Malaysia	21.33	q
14	3	Ali Khadivar	Iran	21.37	Q
15	3	Liang Jinsheng	China	21.41	q
16	1	Mohamed Obaid Al-Hindi	Oman	21.66	q
17	2	Noureddine Hadid	Lebanon	21.92	
18	4	Rashid Huwaishal	Oman	22.13	
19	1	Abdelrahman Abu Al-Hummos	Jordan	22.18	
19	3	Christopher Boulos	Lebanon	22.18	
21	2	Grigoriy Derepaskin	Tajikistan	22.30	
22	2	Shariful Islam	Bangladesh	22.41	
22	4	Shinebayar Damdinchimeg	Mongolia	22.41	
24	3	Sarees Ahmed	Maldives	22.77	
25	1	Jantsandorj Ganbold	Mongolia	23.83	
26	3	Tosin Ogunode	Qatar	1:55.51	
	4	Hassan Saaid	Maldives	DNS	

=== Semifinals ===
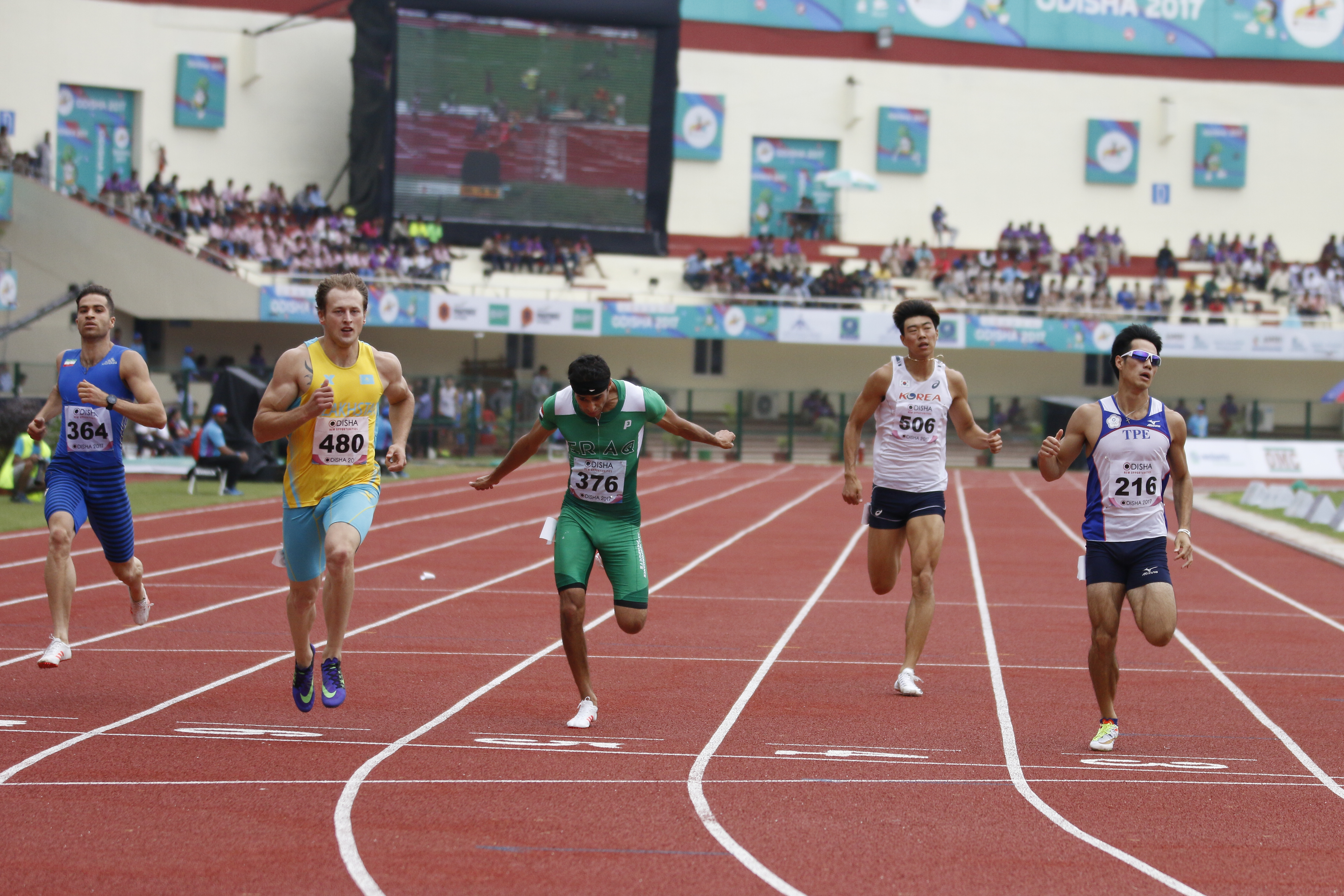
Semifinal 1

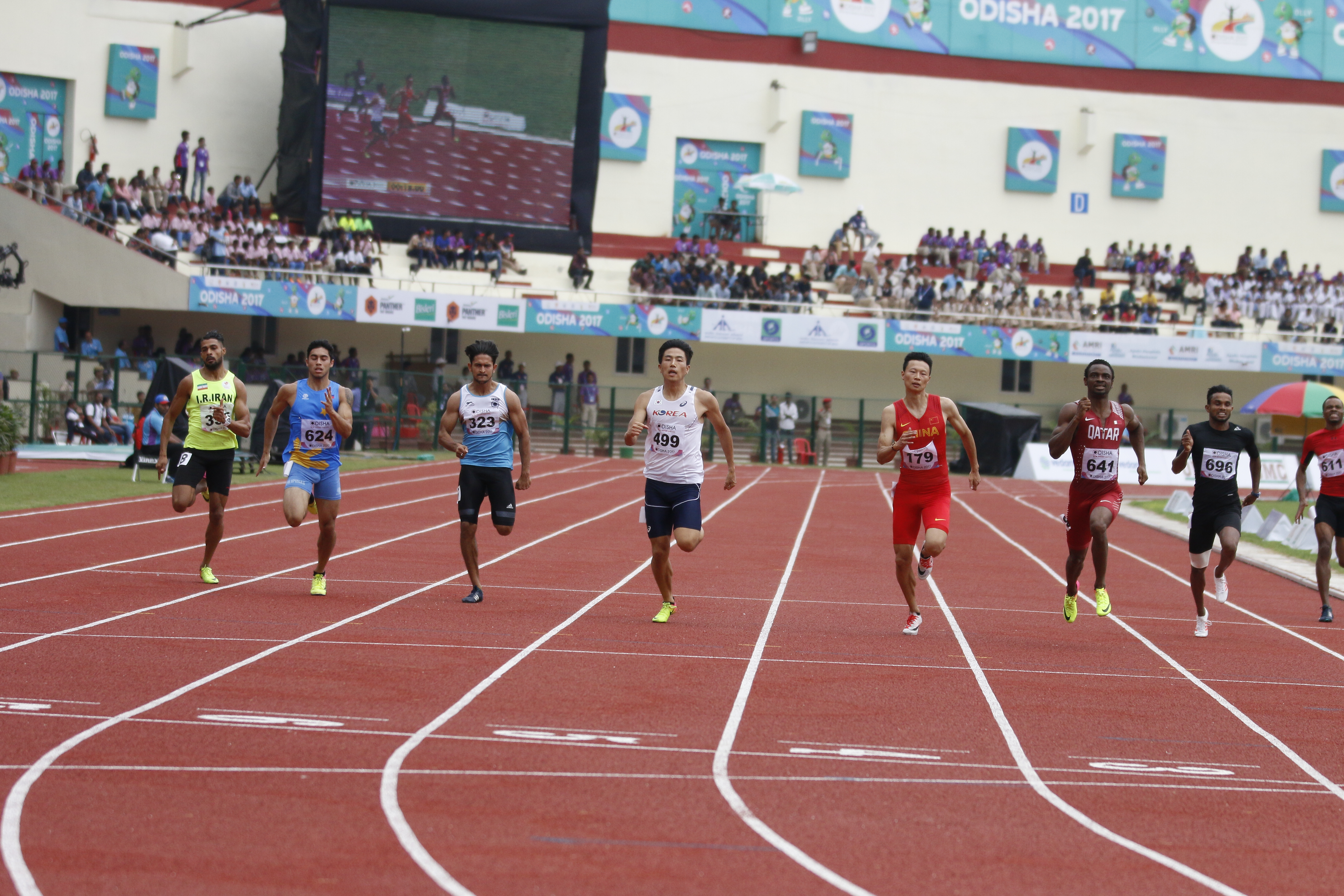
Semifinal 2

Qualification rule: First 3 in each semifinal (Q) and the next 2 fastest (q) qualified for the final.

Wind:
Heat 1: -0.1 m/s, Heat 2: +0.1 m/s

Rank	Heat	Name	Nationality	Time	Notes
1	2	Park Bong-go	South Korea	20.91	Q
2	2	Bie Ge	China	20.95	Q
3	1	Vladislav Grigoryev	Kazakhstan	20.98	Q
4	1	Kotaro Taniguchi	Japan	21.01	Q
5	2	Femi Ogunode	Qatar	21.05	Q
6	2	Trenten Anthony Beram	Philippines	21.05	q
7	1	Yang Chun-han	Chinese Taipei	21.09	Q
8	2	Amiya Kumar Mallick	India	21.12	q
9	1	Ahmed Esam	Iraq	21.14	
10	1	Hassan Taftian	Iran	21.18	
11	2	Vinoj Suranjaya De Silva	Sri Lanka	21.27	
12	2	Ali Khadivar	Iran	21.28	
13	1	Aravinn Thevarr	Malaysia	21.41	
14	1	Lee Jae-ha	South Korea	21.66	
15	2	Mohamed Obaid Al-Hindi	Oman	21.93	
16	1	Liang Jinsheng	China	22.10	

=== Final ===
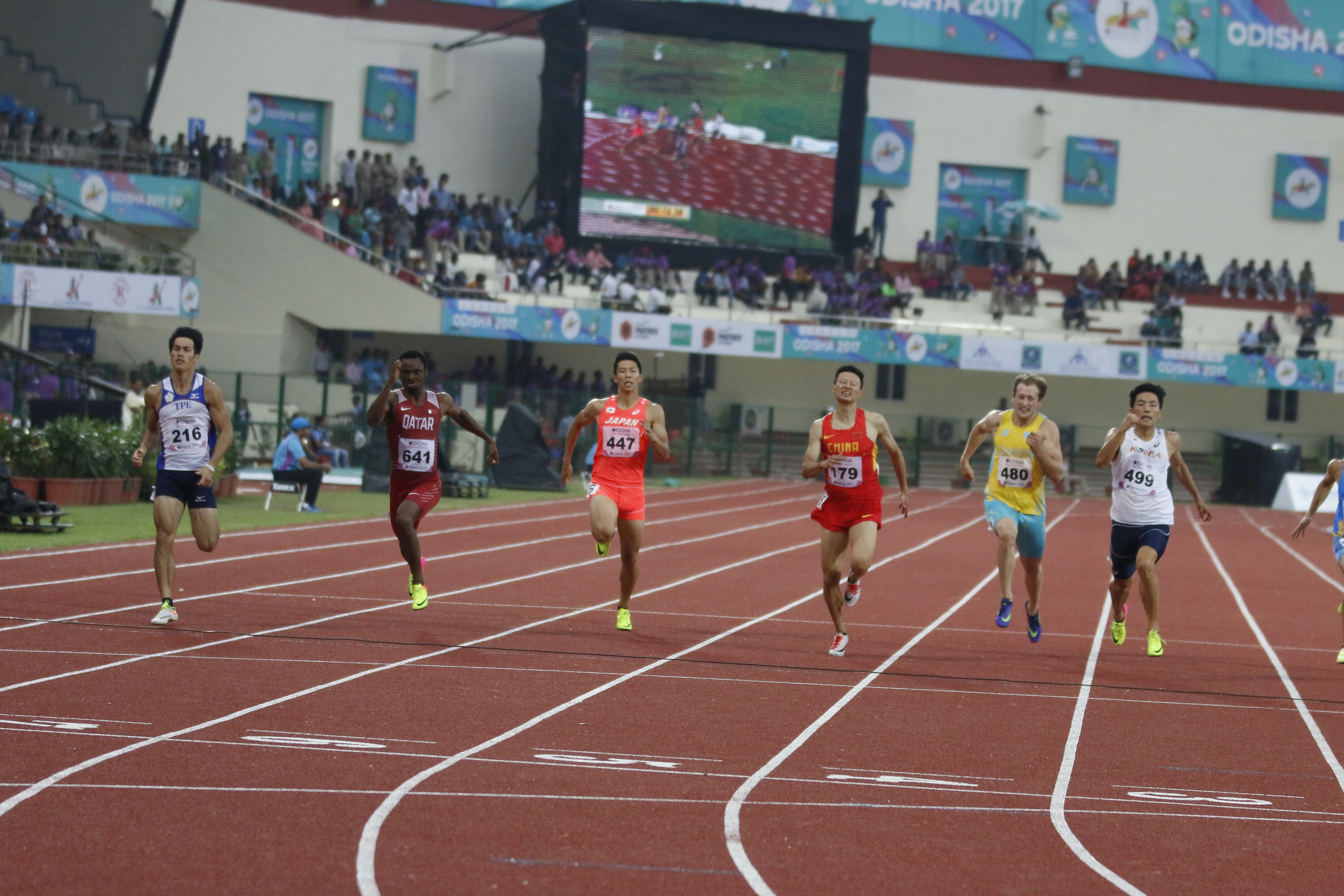
The final

Wind: 0.0 m/s

Rank	Lane	Name	Nationality	Time	Notes
1st place, gold medalist(s)	8	Yang Chun-han	Chinese Taipei	20.66	NR
2nd place, silver medalist(s)	3	Park Bong-go	South Korea	20.76	
3rd place, bronze medalist(s)	7	Femi Ogunode	Qatar	20.79	
4	5	Bie Ge	China	20.85	
5	2	Trenten Anthony Beram	Philippines	20.96	NR
6	6	Kotaro Taniguchi	Japan	21.01	
7	1	Amiya Kumar Mallick	India	21.03	PB
8	4	Vladislav Grigoryev	Kazakhstan	21.07	
