= Athletics at the 2018 Asian Games – Men's 4 × 100 metres relay =

Men's 4 × 100 metres relay at the 2018 Asian Games
- Venue: Gelora Bung Karno Stadium
- Date: 29–30 August 2018
- Competitors: 59 from 14 nations

Medalists
gold medal	Japan; Ryota Yamagata, Shuhei Tada, Yoshihide Kiryu, Asuka Cambridge
silver medal	Indonesia; Mohammad Fadlin, Lalu Muhammad Zohri, Eko Rimbawan, Bayu Kertanegara
bronze medal	China; Xu Haiyang, Mi Hong, Su Bingtian, Xu Zhouzheng

The men's 4 × 100 metres relay competition at the 2018 Asian Games took place on 29 and 30 August 2018 at the Gelora Bung Karno Stadium.

== Schedule ==
All times are Western Indonesia Time (UTC+07:00)

Date	Time	Event
Wednesday, 29 August 2018	21:15	Round 1
Thursday, 30 August 2018	19:10	Final

== Records ==
Prior to this competition, the existing world, Asian and Games records were as follows.

World Record	Jamaica	36.84	London, United Kingdom	11 August 2012
Asian Record	Japan	37.60	Rio de Janeiro, Brazil	19 August 2016
Games Record	China	37.99	Incheon, South Korea	2 October 2014

== Results ==
Legend

- DSQ — Disqualified

=== Round 1 ===
- Qualification: First 3 in each heat (Q) and the next 2 fastest (q) advance to the final.

==== Heat 1 ====
Rank	Team	Time	Notes
1	Japan (JPN); Ryota Yamagata; Shuhei Tada; Yoshihide Kiryu; Asuka Cambridge	38.20	Q
2	China (CHN); Xu Haiyang; Mi Hong; Su Bingtian; Xu Zhouzheng	38.88	Q
3	South Korea (KOR); Kim Kuk-young; Mo Il-hwan; Oh Kyong-soo; Kim Min-kyun	39.34	Q
4	Hong Kong (HKG); Chan Ming Tai; Ng Ka Fung; Lai Chun Ho; Tsui Chi Ho	39.54	q
5	Philippines (PHI); Anfernee Lopena; Eric Cray; Clinton Bautista; Trenten Beram	39.59	
6	Oman (OMA); Fatek Adnan; Barakat Al-Harthi; Mohamed Obaid Al-Saadi; Ammar Al-Saifi	39.76	
7	Kazakhstan (KAZ); Vyacheslav Zems; Alexandr Kasper; Vitaliy Zems; Vladislav Grigoryev	40.04	

==== Heat 2 ====
Rank	Team	Time	Notes
1	Indonesia (INA); Mohammad Fadlin; Lalu Muhammad Zohri; Eko Rimbawan; Bayu Kertanegara	39.03	Q
2	Chinese Taipei (TPE); Wei Yi-ching; Yang Chun-han; Wei Tai-sheng; Wang Wei-hsu	39.15	Q
3	Thailand (THA); Kritsada Namsuwan; Bandit Chuangchai; Siripol Punpa; Jaran Sathoengram	39.52	Q
4	Malaysia (MAS); Haiqal Hanafi; Jonathan Nyepa; Zulfiqar Ismail; Khairul Hafiz Jantan	39.59	q
5	Bahrain (BRN); Saeed Al-Khaldi; Andrew Fisher; Yaqoob Salem Yaqoob; Musa Isah	39.67	
6	Pakistan (PAK); Muhammad Shahbaz; Liaquat Ali; Uzair Rehman; Gohar Shahbaz	40.56	
7	Qatar (QAT); Abdelaziz Mohamed; Saoud Al-Humaidi; Jaber Al-Mamari; Owaab Barrow	41.03	

=== Final ===
Rank	Team	Time	Notes
1st place, gold medalist(s)	Japan (JPN); Ryota Yamagata; Shuhei Tada; Yoshihide Kiryu; Asuka Cambridge	38.16	
2nd place, silver medalist(s)	Indonesia (INA); Mohammad Fadlin; Lalu Muhammad Zohri; Eko Rimbawan; Bayu Kertanegara	38.77	
3rd place, bronze medalist(s)	China (CHN); Xu Haiyang; Mi Hong; Su Bingtian; Xu Zhouzheng	38.89	
4	Chinese Taipei (TPE); Wei Yi-ching; Yang Chun-han; Wei Tai-sheng; Wang Wei-hsu	38.98	
5	South Korea (KOR); Oh Kyong-soo; Park Tae-geon; Kim Kuk-young; Kim Min-kyun	39.10	
6	Thailand (THA); Kritsada Namsuwan; Bandit Chuangchai; Chayut Khongprasit; Jaran Sathoengram	39.29	
7	Hong Kong (HKG); Chan Ming Tai; Ng Ka Fung; Lai Chun Ho; Tsui Chi Ho	39.48	
—	Malaysia (MAS); Nixson Kennedy; Jonathan Nyepa; Zulfiqar Ismail; Khairul Hafiz Jantan	DSQ	
