= Athletics at the 2018 Asian Games – Men's 200 metres =

Men's 200 metres at the 2018 Asian Games
- Venue: Gelora Bung Karno Stadium
- Date: 28–29 August 2018
- Competitors: 31 from 24 nations

Medalists
| gold medal | Yuki Koike | Japan |
| silver medal | Yang Chun-han | Chinese Taipei |
| bronze medal | Yaqoob Salem Yaqoob | Bahrain |

The men's 200 metres competition at the 2018 Asian Games took place on 28 and 29 August 2018 at the Gelora Bung Karno Stadium.

== Schedule ==
All times are Western Indonesia Time (UTC+07:00)

| Date | Time | Event |
|---|---|---|
| Tuesday, 28 August 2018 | 10:15 | Round 1 |
| Tuesday, 28 August 2018 | 19:15 | Semifinals |
| Wednesday, 29 August 2018 | 19:05 | Final |

== Records ==
Prior to this competition, the existing world, Asian and Games records were as follows.

| World Record | Usain Bolt (JAM) | 19.19 | Berlin, Germany | 20 August 2009 |
| Asian Record | Femi Ogunode (QAT) | 19.97 | Brussels, Belgium | 11 September 2015 |
| Games Record | Femi Ogunode (QAT) | 20.14 | Incheon, South Korea | 1 October 2014 |

== Results ==
Legend

- DNF — Did not finish
- DNS — Did not start
- DSQ — Disqualified

=== Round 1 ===
- Qualification: First 3 in each heat (Q) and the next 4 fastest (q) advance to the semifinals.

==== Heat 1 ====
- Wind: −0.1 m/s

| Rank | Athlete | Time | Notes |
|---|---|---|---|
| 1 | Mohamed Obaid Al-Saadi (OMA) | 20.74 | Q |
| 2 | Kim Kuk-young (KOR) | 20.78 | Q |
| 3 | Trenten Beram (PHI) | 21.14 | Q |
| 4 | Sittiphon Donpritee (THA) | 21.52 | |
| 5 | Uzair Rehman (PAK) | 21.70 | |
| 6 | Erdenebatyn Turtogtokh (MGL) | 23.07 | |
| — | Abdullah Abkar Mohammed (KSA) | DNS | |

==== Heat 2 ====
- Wind: −0.7 m/s

| Rank | Athlete | Time | Notes |
|---|---|---|---|
| 1 | Yaqoob Salem Yaqoob (BRN) | 20.86 | Q |
| 2 | Shota Iizuka (JPN) | 21.08 | Q |
| 3 | Hassan Taftian (IRI) | 21.25 | Q |
| 4 | Wei Tai-sheng (TPE) | 21.25 | q |
| 5 | Vladislav Grigoryev (KAZ) | 21.28 | q |
| 6 | Muhammad Shahbaz (PAK) | 21.91 | |
| 7 | Chan Ka Chun (HKG) | 22.13 | |
| 8 | Aksonesath Lathsavong (LAO) | 22.94 | |

==== Heat 3 ====
- Wind: −1.1 m/s

| Rank | Athlete | Time | Notes |
|---|---|---|---|
| 1 | Yang Chun-han (TPE) | 20.95 | Q |
| 2 | Yuki Koike (JPN) | 21.30 | Q |
| 3 | Noureddine Hadid (LBN) | 21.33 | Q |
| 4 | Jo Kum-ryong (PRK) | 21.85 | |
| 5 | Noor Firdaus Ar-Rasyid (BRU) | 21.88 | |
| 6 | Pen Sokong (CAM) | 22.44 | |
| — | Eko Rimbawan (INA) | DSQ | |
| — | Hassan Saaid (MDV) | DNS | |

==== Heat 4 ====
- Wind: +0.1 m/s

| Rank | Athlete | Time | Notes |
|---|---|---|---|
| 1 | Park Tae-geon (KOR) | 20.77 | Q |
| 2 | Tosin Ogunode (QAT) | 20.78 | Q |
| 3 | Bie Ge (CHN) | 20.81 | Q |
| 4 | Ahmed Esam (IRQ) | 21.31 | q |
| 5 | Bayu Kertanegara (INA) | 21.34 | q |
| 6 | Tang Yik Chun (HKG) | 21.89 | |
| — | Ali Khadivar (IRI) | DNS | |
| — | Yam Sajan Sunar (NEP) | DNS | |

=== Semifinals ===
- Qualification: First 3 in each heat (Q) and the next 2 fastest (q) advance to the final.

==== Heat 1 ====
- Wind: −0.3 m/s

| Rank | Athlete | Time | Notes |
|---|---|---|---|
| 1 | Yaqoob Salem Yaqoob (BRN) | 20.61 | Q |
| 2 | Shota Iizuka (JPN) | 20.64 | Q |
| 3 | Park Tae-geon (KOR) | 20.69 | Q |
| 4 | Trenten Beram (PHI) | 21.26 | |
| 5 | Wei Tai-sheng (TPE) | 21.27 | |
| 6 | Ahmed Esam (IRQ) | 21.34 | |
| 7 | Hassan Taftian (IRI) | 21.47 | |
| — | Tosin Ogunode (QAT) | DNF | |

==== Heat 2 ====
- Wind: +0.2 m/s

| Rank | Athlete | Time | Notes |
|---|---|---|---|
| 1 | Yuki Koike (JPN) | 20.35 | Q |
| 2 | Yang Chun-han (TPE) | 20.53 | Q |
| 3 | Kim Kuk-young (KOR) | 20.66 | Q |
| 4 | Mohamed Obaid Al-Saadi (OMA) | 20.83 | q |
| 5 | Bie Ge (CHN) | 20.90 | q |
| 6 | Noureddine Hadid (LBN) | 21.22 | |
| 7 | Vladislav Grigoryev (KAZ) | 21.42 | |
| 8 | Bayu Kertanegara (INA) | 21.58 | |

=== Final ===
- Wind: +0.7 m/s

| Rank | Athlete | Time | Notes |
|---|---|---|---|
| 1st place, gold medalist(s) | Yuki Koike (JPN) | 20.23 | |
| 2nd place, silver medalist(s) | Yang Chun-han (TPE) | 20.23 | |
| 3rd place, bronze medalist(s) | Yaqoob Salem Yaqoob (BRN) | 20.55 | |
| 4 | Kim Kuk-young (KOR) | 20.59 | |
| 5 | Park Tae-geon (KOR) | 20.61 | |
| 6 | Shota Iizuka (JPN) | 20.68 | |
| 7 | Mohamed Obaid Al-Saadi (OMA) | 20.81 | |
| 8 | Bie Ge (CHN) | 21.07 | |
