= Tang Xingqiang =

Chinese sprinter

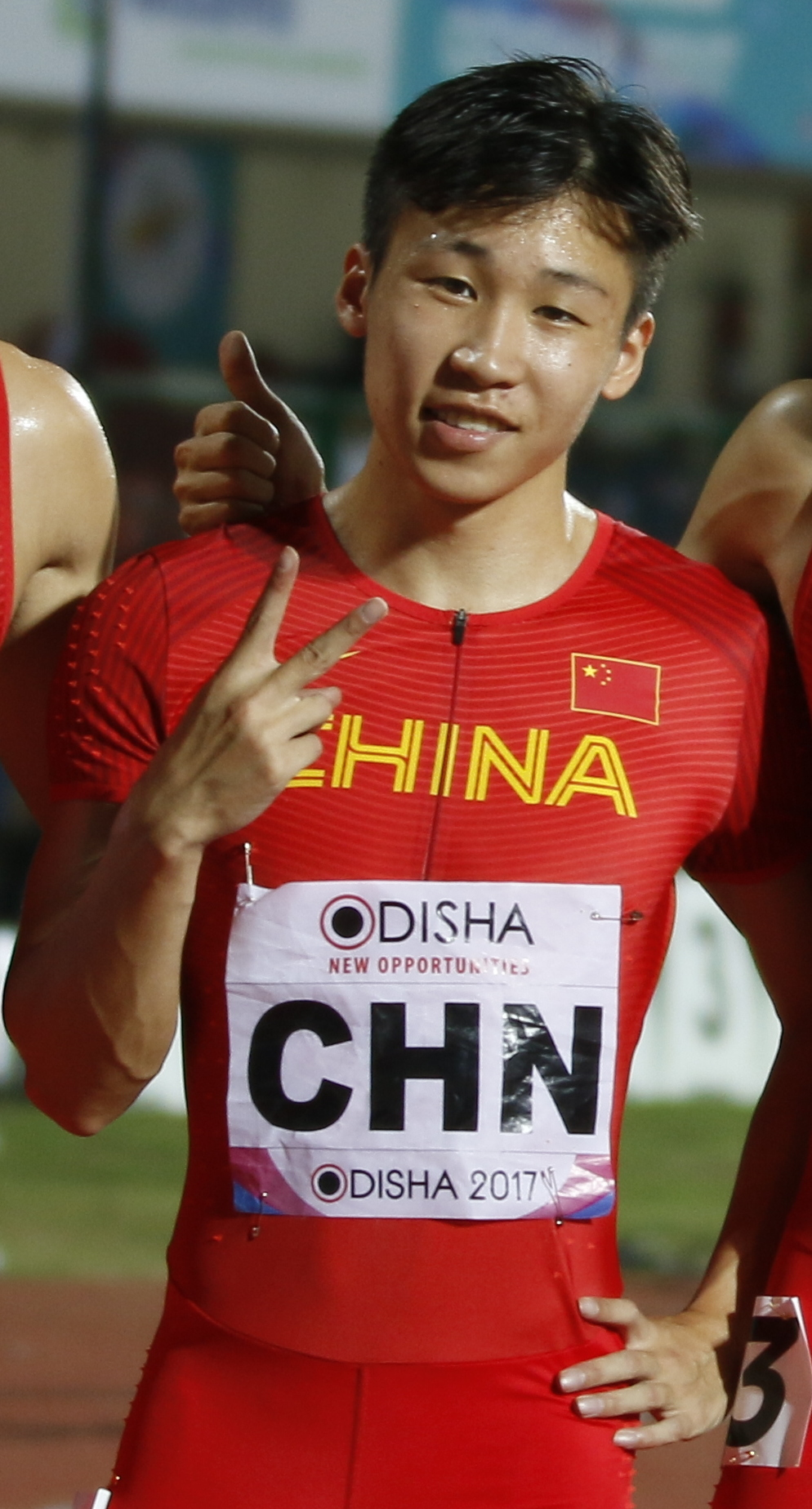
- Tang in 2017

Personal information
- Nationality: Chinese
- Born: 11 August 1995 (age 30) Zhouning County, Fujian, China
- Height: 1.70 m (5 ft 7 in)
- Weight: 61 kg (134 lb)

Sport
- Sport: Track and field
- Event: 100 metres

Achievements and titles
- Personal best: 100 m: 10.22 (2021)
Medal record
Olympic Games
| Bronze medal – third place | 2020 Tokyo | 4×100 m relay |
IAAF World Relays
| Bronze medal – third place | 2017 Nassau | 4×100 m relay |
Asian Championships
| Gold medal – first place | 2017 Bhubaneswar | 4×100 m relay |

Tang Xingqiang (Chinese: 汤星强; born 11 August 1995) is a Chinese track and field sprinter who competes in the 100 metres. He represented his country at the 2016 and 2020 Summer Olympics.

== Career ==
He made his international senior debut at the 2015 Asian Athletics Championships, competing in the 200 metres and reaching the semi-finals.

At the 2016 Summer Olympics, he led off a Chinese 4 × 100 metres relay quartet including Xie Zhenye, Su Bingtian, and Zhang Peimeng. The team set an Asian record of 37.82 seconds in qualifying and finished fourth in the final. The record was quickly broken by Japan in the following relay heat. In the 2020 Summer Olympics, he also led off the same Chinese relay quartet, with Zhang replaced with Wu Zhiqiang, winning a bronze medal and equaling the Chinese record set at the 2019 World Championships.

== Personal bests ==
- 60 metres – 6.56 (2016)
- 100 metres – 10.22 (2021)
- 200 metres – 20.39 (2021)
- 200 metres indoor – 22.00 (2016)
- 4 × 100 metres relay – 37.79 (2021)

== International competitions ==
| Year | Competition | Venue | Position | Event | Notes |
|---|---|---|---|---|---|
| 2015 | Asian Championships | Wuhan, China | 11th (sf) | 200 m | 21.06 |
| 2016 | Olympic Games | Rio de Janeiro, Brazil | 4th | 4 × 100 m relay | 37.90 |
| 2017 | IAAF World Relays | Nassau, Bahamas | 3rd | 4 × 100 m relay | 39.22 |
| 2017 | IAAF World Relays | Nassau, Bahamas | 6th | 4 × 200 m relay | 1:22.91 |
| 2017 | Asian Championships | Bhubaneswar, India | 8th (sf) | 100 m | 10.43^{1} |
| 2017 | Asian Championships | Bhubaneswar, India | 1st | 4 × 100 m relay | 39.38 |
| 2020 | Olympic Games | Tokyo, Japan | 3rd | 4 × 100 m relay | 37.79 =NR |
| 2022 | World Championships | Eugene, United States | 12th (h) | 4 × 100 m relay | 38.83 |

^{1}Disqualified in the final
