= 2017 Asian Athletics Championships – Men's 4 × 100 metres relay =

The men's 4 × 100 metres relay at the 2017 Asian Athletics Championships was held on 7 and 8 July.

== Medalists ==
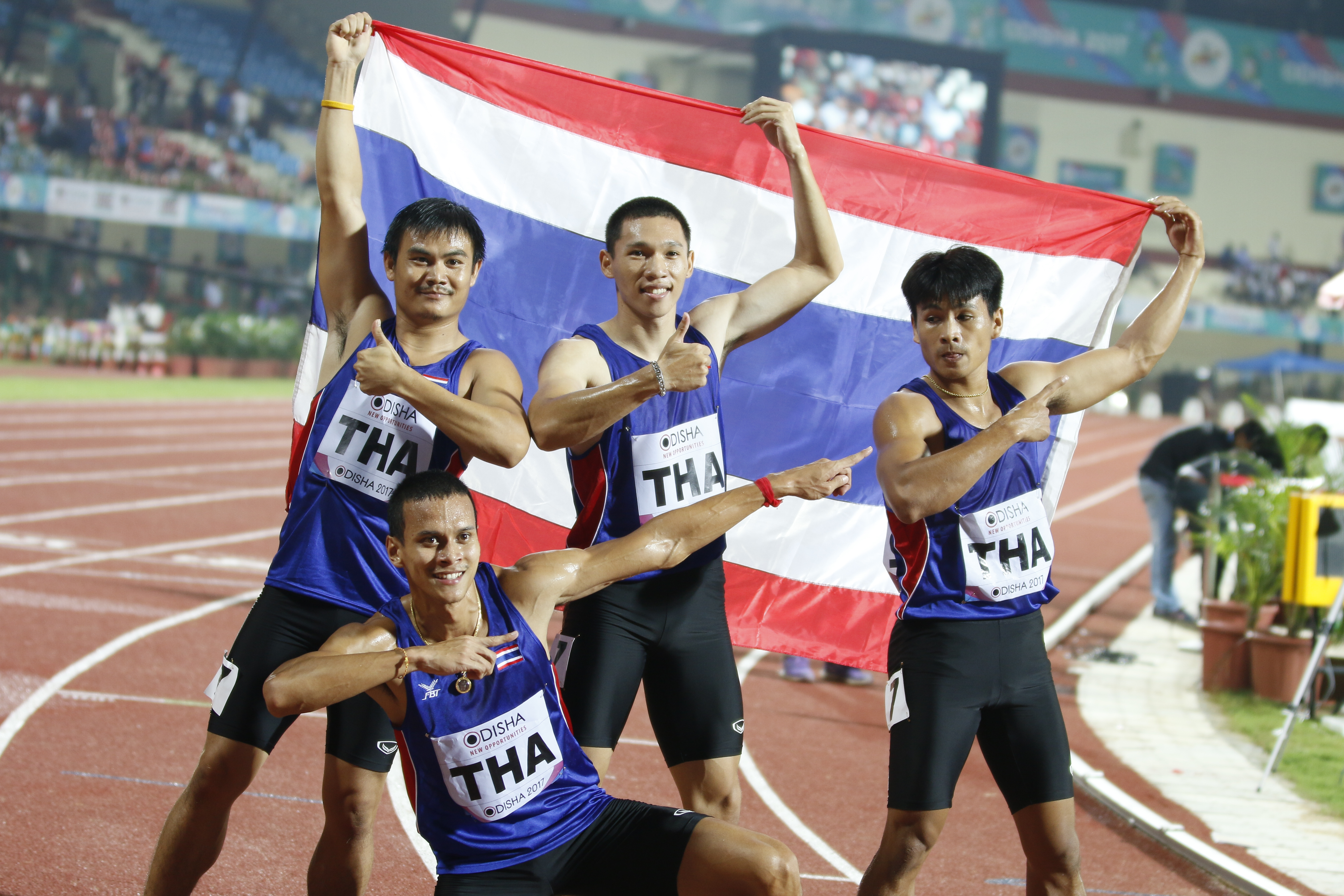
Athletes during 22nd Asian Athletics Championships in Bhubaneswar.

Gold	Silver	Bronze
China; Tang Xingqiang; Liang Jinsheng; Bie Ge; Xu Haiyang; Xu Zhouzheng*	Thailand; Kritsada Namsuwun; Bandit Chuangchai; Jirapong Meenapra; Jaran Sathoengram; Sowan Ruttanapon*	Hong Kong; So Chun Hong; Ng Ka Fung; Tang Yik Chun; Tsui Chi Ho; Wan Hin Chung*

*Athletes who ran in heats only

== Results ==
=== Heats ===
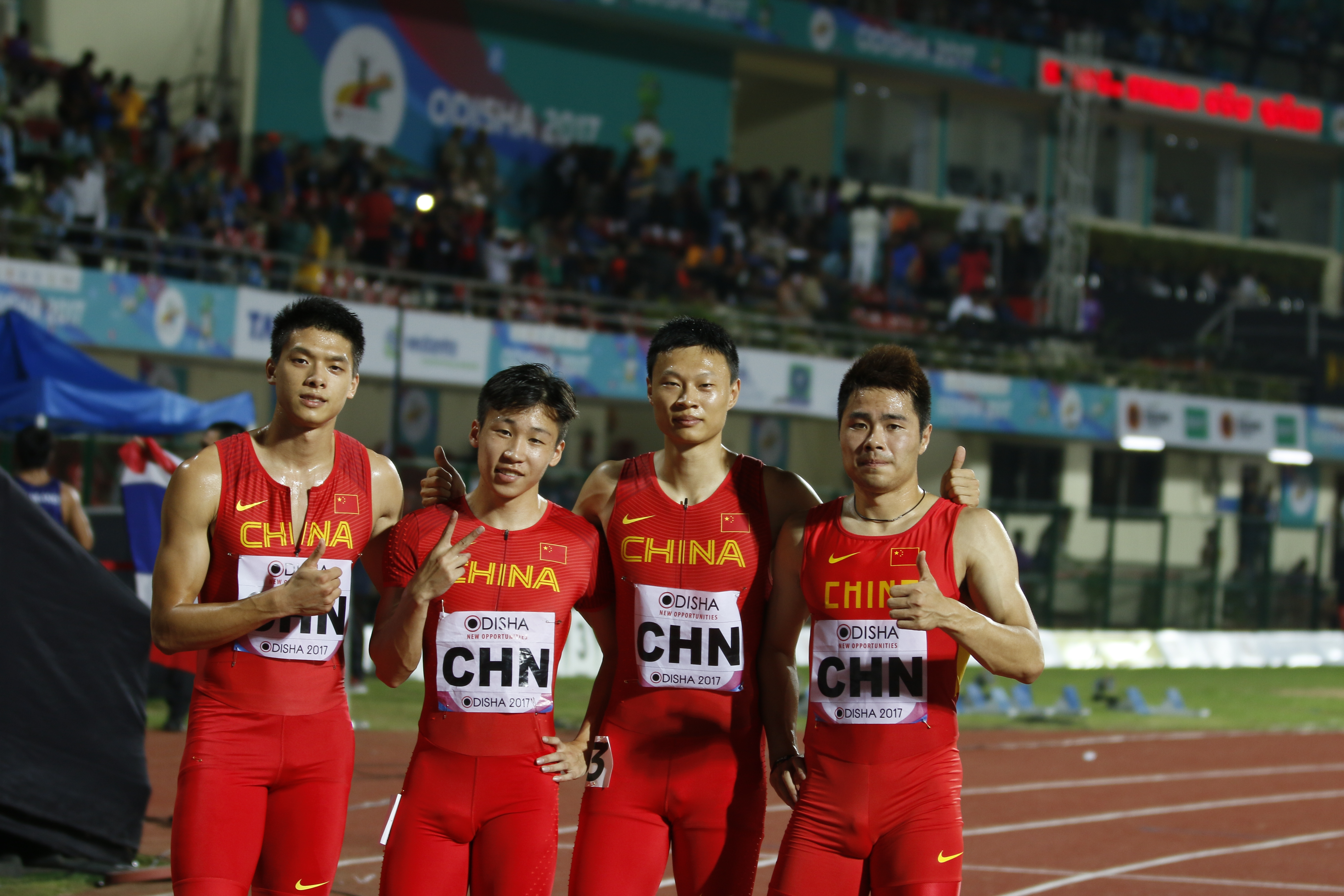
4x100m Men Relay - Gold Medal Winners Of China

Qualification rule: First 3 in each heat (Q) and the next 2 fastest (q) qualified for the final.

Rank	Heat	Nation	Athletes	Time	Notes
1	1	China	Tang Xingqiang, Liang Jinsheng, Bie Ge, Xu Zhouzheng	39.06	Q
2	1	Chinese Taipei	Wei Yi-ching, Yang Chun-han, Yeh Shou-po, Chen Chia-hsun	39.40	Q
3	1	Thailand	Sowan Ruttanapon, Bandit Chuangchai, Jirapong Meenapra, Kritsada Namsuwun	39.48	Q
4	1	Sri Lanka	Mohamed Ashraful, Himasha Eashan, Vinoj Suranjaya De Silva, Shehan Ambepitiya	39.69	q
5	2	South Korea	Lee Ji-woo, Park Bong-go, Lee Yo-han, Lee Jae-ha	40.18	Q
6	2	Hong Kong	Wan Hin Chung, Ng Ka Fung, Tang Yik Chun, Tsui Chi Ho	40.40	Q
7	1	Malaysia	Nixson Anak, Jonathan Anak, Badrul Hisyam, Aravinn Thevarr	40.50	q
8	2	Singapore	Muhd Hariz Darajit, Calvin Kang Li Loong, Ariff Januri, Timothee Yap Jin Wei	40.83	Q
9	1	Oman	Yousuf Marzouq, Samir Khalaf, Mohamed Obaid Al-Hindi, Rashid Huwaishal	41.08	
10	2	Bangladesh	Abdur Rouf, Kazi Imran, Masud Rana, Masbah Ahmmed	42.64	
11	2	Macau	Chong Kuan Hou, Wong Ka Chun, Lai Ho Tat Costa, Ao Ieong Ka Hou	42.72	
12	1	Kuwait	Husain Al-Sheehah, Mishal Khalifa Al-Mutairi, Eissa Al-Youha, Abdulaziz Qarainais	43.87	
	1	Lebanon	Christopher Boulos, Hassan Mansour, Khaled El Denawi, Noureddine Hadid	DQ	
	2	India	Anuroop John, Elakkiya Dasan, Jyoti Debnath Shankar, Amiya Kumar Mallick	DQ	
	2	Philippines		DNS	

=== Final ===
Rank	Lane	Team	Name	Time	Notes
1st place, gold medalist(s)	3	China	Tang Xingqiang, Liang Jinsheng, Bie Ge, Xu Haiyang	39.38	
2nd place, silver medalist(s)	7	Thailand	Kritsada Namsuwun, Bandit Chuangchai, Jirapong Meenapra, Jaran Sathoengram	39.38	
3rd place, bronze medalist(s)	6	Hong Kong	So Chun Hong, Ng Ka Fung, Tang Yik Chun, Tsui Chi Ho	39.53	
4	2	Sri Lanka	Himasha Eashan, Shehan Ambepitiya, Vinoj Suranjaya De Silva, Mohamed Ashraful	39.59	
5	1	Malaysia	Nixson Anak, Jonathan Anak, Badrul Hisyam, Khairul Hafiz	39.98	
6	8	Singapore	Muhd Hariz Darajit, Calvin Kang Li Loong, Ariff Januri, Timothee Yap Jin Wei	40.22	
7	5	Chinese Taipei	Wei Yi-ching, Yang Chun-han, Yeh Shou-po, Chen Chia-hsun	40.23	
8	4	South Korea	Lee Ji-woo, Park Bong-go, Lee Yo-han, Lee Jae-ha	40.26	
