= Track and field at the 2015 Military World Games – Men's 100 metres =

The men's 100 metres event at the 2015 Military World Games was held on 4 and 5 and 6 October at the KAFAC Sports Complex.

== Records ==
Prior to this competition, the existing world and CISM record were as follows:

World Record	Usain Bolt (JAM)	9.58	Berlin, Germany	16 August 2009
CISM World Record	Femi Seun Ogunode (QAT)	10.07	Rio de Janeiro, Brazil	21 July 2011

== Schedule ==
Date	Time	Round
4 October 2015	16:50	Round 1
5 October 2015	11:30	Semifinals
6 October 2015	16:50	Final

== Medalists ==
Gold	Silver	Bronze
Barakat Al-Harthi; Oman	Reza Ghasemi; Iran	Aziz Ouhadi; Morocco

== Results ==
=== Round 1 ===
Qualification: First 3 in each heat (Q) and next 6 fastest (q) qualified for the semifinals.

Wind:
Heat 1: +3.5 m/s, Heat 2: +2.8 m/s, Heat 3: +1.8 m/s, Heat 4: +1.3 m/s, Heat 5: +3.1 m/s, Heat 6: +2.2 m/s

Rank	Heat	Name	Nationality	Time	Notes
1	3	Reza Ghasemi	Iran	10.28	Q
2	6	Bruno de Barros	Brazil	10.32	Q
3	3	Barakat Al-Harthi	Oman	10.33	Q
4	6	Naseib Salmein	United Arab Emirates	10.35	Q
5	6	Serhiy Smelyk	Ukraine	10.36	Q
6	4	Salem Eid Yaqoob	Bahrain	10.37	Q
7	6	Mike Mokamba Nyang'au	Kenya	10.38	q
8	2	Samuel Francis	Qatar	10.42	Q
9	5	Delmas Obou	Italy	10.45	Q
10	1	Aziz Ouhadi	Morocco	10.49	Q
11	2	Hassan Taftian	Iran	10.50	Q
12	4	Kyongsoo Oh	South Korea	10.51	Q
13	2	Grzegorz Zimniewicz	Poland	10.53	Q
14	4	Dariusz Kuc	Poland	10.54	Q
15	1	Robert Hering	Germany	10.55	Q
16	5	Kim Min-Kyun	South Korea	10.60	Q
17	3	Stanley del Carmen	Dominican Republic	10.60	Q
18	6	Liaquat Ali	Pakistan	10.67	q
19	5	Mohamed Abdul Ladeef	Sri Lanka	10.69	Q
20	6	Vidya Sagar	India	10.69	q
21	6	Muhammad Patoniah	Indonesia	10.70	q
22	1	Tony Kipruto Chirchir	Kenya	10.71	Q
23	4	Eid Abdulla Al-Kuwari	Qatar	10.71	q
24	1	Damien Broothaerts	Belgium	10.76	q
25	3	José Carlos Moreira	Brazil	10.77	
26	3	Teddy Tinmar	France	10.78	
27	5	Jyoti Sankar Debnath	India	10.80	
28	1	Mayovanex de Oleo	Dominican Republic	10.80	
29	5	Steven Gugerli	Switzerland	10.82	
30	2	Anton Jeremy Graphenreed	United States	10.83	
31	2	Farrel Octaviandi	Indonesia	10.84	
32	2	Pascal Mueller	Switzerland	10.86	
33	2	Hakan Karacaoglu	Turkey	10.88	
34	4	Fabio Cerutti	Italy	10.92	
35	4	Samir Al Riyami	Oman	10.95	
36	5	Abdourahim Haroun	Chad	10.95	
37	1	Noureddine Hadid	Lebanon	11.01	
38	3	Okan Kamis	Turkey	11.05	
39	5	Hussain Ghuloum Rustom Saleh Alba	United Arab Emirates	11.06	
40	3	Dominique Shands	United States	11.12	
41	4	Venislav Tsvetelyubov Nikolov	Bulgaria	11.53	
42	5	Abdallah Islam	Palestine	11.58	
	6	Emmanuel Bingu Chimdzeka	Malawi	DNS	
	1	Pethias Barclays Gondwe Mdoka	Malawi	DNS	

=== Semifinals ===
Qualification: First 2 in each heat (Q) and next 2 fastest (q) qualified for the final.

Wind:
Heat 1: -2.2 m/s, Heat 2: -0.7 m/s, Heat 3: -1.4 m/s

Rank	Heat	Name	Nationality	Time	Notes
1	3	Samuel Francis	Qatar	10.49	Q
2	2	Bruno de Barros	Brazil	10.52	Q
3	3	Hassan Taftian	Iran	10.54	Q
4	1	Barakat Al-Harthi	Oman	10.60	Q
5	1	Aziz Ouhadi	Morocco	10.60	Q
6	1	Reza Ghasemi	Iran	10.63	q
7	2	Delmas Obou	Italy	10.66	Q
8	3	Salem Eid Yaqoob	Bahrain	10.66	q
9	3	Kyongsoo Oh	South Korea	10.67	
10	2	Naseib Salmein	United Arab Emirates	10.68	
11	3	Stanley del Carmen	Dominican Republic	10.73	
12	2	Mike Mokamba Nyang'au	Kenya	10.76	
13	3	Dariusz Kuc	Poland	10.76	
14	2	Grzegorz Zimniewicz	Poland	10.79	
15	2	Eid Abdulla Al-Kuwari	Qatar	10.81	
16	2	Mohamed Abdul Ladeef	Sri Lanka	10.81	
17	1	Min-Kyun Kim	South Korea	10.83	
18	1	Serhiy Smelyk	Ukraine	10.85	
19	2	Robert Hering	Germany	10.85	
20	3	Vidya Sagar	India	10.94	
21	1	Liaquat Ali	Pakistan	11.02	
22	1	Tony Kipruto Chirchir	Kenya	11.03	
23	3	Muhammad Patoniah	Indonesia	11.04	
24	1	Damien Broothaerts	Belgium	11.22	

=== Final ===
Wind: +1.7 m/s

Rank	Lane	Name	Nationality	Time	Notes
1st place, gold medalist(s)	3	Barakat Al-Harthi	Oman	10.16	
2nd place, silver medalist(s)	1	Reza Ghasemi	Iran	10.18	
3rd place, bronze medalist(s)	8	Aziz Ouhadi	Morocco	10.25	
4	5	Hassan Taftian	Iran	10.27	
5	6	Bruno de Barros	Brazil	10.29	
6	4	Samuel Francis	Qatar	10.33	
7	7	Delmas Obou	Italy	10.38	
8	2	Salem Eid Yaqoob	Bahrain	10.49	
