= 2015 Asian Athletics Championships – Men's 200 metres =

The men's 200 metres event at the 2015 Asian Athletics Championships was held on the 6 and 7 of June.

== Medalists ==
Gold	Femi Seun Ogunode; Qatar
Silver	Fahhad Mohammed Al-Subaie; Saudi Arabia
Bronze	Dharambir Singh; India

== Results ==
=== Heats ===
First 4 in each heat (Q) and the next 4 fastest (q) qualified for the semifinals.

Wind:
Heat 1: -0.9 m/s, Heat 2: -2.2 m/s, Heat 3: -0.1 m/s, Heat 4: -0.7 m/s, Heat 5: -1.5 m/s

Rank	Heat	Name	Nationality	Time	Notes
1	4	Femi Seun Ogunode	Qatar	20.51	Q
2	5	Fahhad Mohammed Al-Subaie	Saudi Arabia	20.97	Q
3	4	Tang Xingqiang	China	20.99	Q
4	4	Yang Chun-Han	Chinese Taipei	20.99	Q
5	1	Shōta Hara	Japan	21.05	Q
6	3	Reza Ghasemi	Iran	21.13	Q
6	4	Sajjad Hashemi	Iran	21.13	Q
8	1	Dharmbir Singh	India	21.16	Q
9	1	Samuel Francis	Qatar	21.18	Q
10	1	Khalid Al-Ghailani	Oman	21.18	Q
11	2	Kotaro Taniguchi	Japan	21.19	Q
12	5	Hassan Saaid	Maldives	21.26	Q
13	2	Bie Ge	China	21.31	Q
14	3	Mohammed Jumaai	Iraq	21.38	Q
15	5	Liaqat Ali	Pakistan	21.46	Q
16	3	Pan Xinyue	China	21.47	Q
17	2	Ng Ka Fung	Hong Kong	21.48	Q
18	3	Wang Wen-Tang	Chinese Taipei	21.55	Q
19	1	Tang Yik Chun	Hong Kong	21.59	q
19	5	Vinoj Muthumuni	Sri Lanka	21.59	Q
21	3	Barakat Al-Harthi	Oman	21.68	q
22	4	Bandar Atiyah Kaabi	Saudi Arabia	21.78	q
23	2	Aleksander Pronzhenko	Tajikistan	21.79	Q
24	1	Choi Min-suk	South Korea	21.80	q
25	1	Davron Atabaev	Tajikistan	21.85	
26	4	Battulgyn Achitbileg	Mongolia	22.09	
27	3	Noureddine Hadid	Lebanon	22.15	
28	5	Aasish Chaudhary	Nepal	22.25	
29	2	Tang Cho Hin	Macau	22.37	
30	3	Nguyen Ngoc An	Vietnam	22.52	
30	5	Ganboldyn Shijirbaatar	Mongolia	22.52	
32	2	Masbah Ahmmed	Bangladesh	22.80	
33	4	Nujoom Hassan	Maldives	23.02	
34	2	Pen Sokong	Cambodia	23.05	

=== Semifinals ===
First 2 in each semifinal (Q) and the next 2 fastest (q) qualified for the final.

Wind:
Heat 1: -1.1 m/s, Heat 2: -0.7 m/s, Heat 3: -1.0 m/s

Rank	Heat	Name	Nationality	Time	Notes
1	2	Femi Seun Ogunode	Qatar	20.28	Q, CR
2	1	Fahhad Mohammed Al-Subaie	Saudi Arabia	20.60	Q
3	1	Dharmbir Singh	India	20.87	Q
3	2	Kotaro Taniguchi	Japan	20.87	Q
5	3	Reza Ghasemi	Iran	20.90	Q
6	2	Yang Chun-Han	Chinese Taipei	20.92	q
7	2	Khalid Al-Ghailani	Oman	20.95	q
8	1	Sajjad Hashemi	Iran	20.96	
8	3	Shōta Hara	Japan	20.96	Q
10	3	Bie Ge	China	21.05	
11	1	Tang Xingqiang	China	21.06	
12	1	Samuel Francis	Qatar	21.10	
13	2	Pan Xinyue	China	21.13	
14	2	Hassan Saaid	Maldives	21.19	NR
15	3	Mohammed Jumaai	Iraq	21.21	
16	3	Ng Ka Fung	Hong Kong	21.24	
17	3	Wang Wen-Tang	Chinese Taipei	21.31	
18	1	Liaqat Ali	Pakistan	21.43	
19	2	Tang Yik Chun	Hong Kong	21.54	
20	1	Vinoj Muthumuni	Sri Lanka	21.57	
21	2	Aleksander Pronzhenko	Tajikistan	21.68	
22	1	Choi Min-suk	South Korea	21.74	
23	3	Bandar Atiyah Kaabi	Saudi Arabia	21.92	
	3	Barakat Al-Harthi	Oman	DNS	

=== Final ===
Wind: +1.0 m/s

Rank	Lane	Name	Nationality	Result	Notes
1st place, gold medalist(s)	3	Femi Seun Ogunode	Qatar	20.32	
2nd place, silver medalist(s)	6	Fahhad Mohammed Al-Subaie	Saudi Arabia	20.63	
3rd place, bronze medalist(s)	5	Dharmbir Singh	India	20.66	
4	7	Kotaro Taniguchi	Japan	20.69	
5	1	Yang Chun-Han	Chinese Taipei	20.96	
6	4	Reza Ghasemi	Iran	21.08	
7	8	Shōta Hara	Japan	21.16	
8	2	Khalid Al-Ghailani	Oman	21.34	
