= 2017 Asian Athletics Championships – Men's 100 metres =

The men's 100 metres at the 2017 Asian Athletics Championships was held on 6 and 7 July.

== Medalists ==
Gold	Hassan Taftian; Iran
Silver	Femi Seun Ogunode; Qatar
Bronze	Yang Chun-han; Chinese Taipei

== Results ==
=== Heats ===
Qualification rule: First 3 in each heat (Q) and the next 6 fastest (q) qualified for the semifinals.

Wind:
Heat 1: -0.1 m/s, Heat 2: +0.8 m/s, Heat 3: +0.1 m/s, Heat 4: -0.2 m/s, Heat 5: 0.0 m/s, Heat 6: +0.5 m/s

Rank	Heat	Name	Nationality	Time	Notes
1	3	Khairul Hafiz Jantan	Malaysia	10.28	Q
2	5	Femi Seun Ogunode	Qatar	10.29	Q
3	3	Xu Haiyang	China	10.34	Q
4	2	Tosin Ogunode	Qatar	10.37	Q
5	1	Yang Chun-han	Chinese Taipei	10.40	Q
6	4	Tang Xingqiang	China	10.43	Q
6	6	Hassan Saaid	Maldives	10.43	Q
8	5	Vinoj Suranjaya De Silva	Sri Lanka	10.44	Q
9	1	Himasha Eashan	Sri Lanka	10.47	Q
10	1	Amiya Kumar Mallick	India	10.48	Q
11	2	Vladislav Grigoryev	Kazakhstan	10.51	Q
12	6	Takumi Kuki	Japan	10.53	Q
12	6	Jonathan Anak	Malaysia	10.53	Q
14	3	Bandit Chuangchai	Thailand	10.60	Q
15	4	Hassan Taftian	Iran	10.64	Q
15	5	Ng Ka Fung	Hong Kong	10.64	Q
17	1	Calvin Kang Li Loong	Singapore	10.68	q
18	4	Tsui Chi Ho	Hong Kong	10.70	Q
19	2	Lee Yo-han	South Korea	10.71	Q
20	3	Ahmed Esam	Iraq	10.72	q
21	2	Kritsada Namsuwun	Thailand	10.73	q
22	2	Noureddine Hadid	Lebanon	10.76	q
23	5	Lee Ji-woo	South Korea	10.78	q
24	4	Anfernee Lopena	Philippines	10.86	q
25	3	Masbah Ahmmed	Bangladesh	10.88	
26	3	Davron Atabaev	Tajikistan	10.90	
27	1	Christopher Boulos	Lebanon	10.95	
28	2	Samir Khalaf	Oman	11.03	
29	5	Kazi Imran	Bangladesh	11.09	
30	2	Chong Kuan Hou	Macau	11.16	
31	1	Azneem Ahmed	Maldives	11.20	
32	3	Ao Ieong Ka Hou	Macau	11.21	
32	5	Ali Moosa Shaiba	United Arab Emirates	11.21	
34	6	Zahiri Abdul Wahab	Afghanistan	11.63	
	4	Shinebayar Damdinchimeg	Mongolia	DQ	
	4	Timothee Yap Jin Wei	Singapore	DQ	
	6	Vyacheslav Zems	Kazakhstan	DQ	
	4	Andrew Fisher	Bahrain	DNS	
	5	Mohamed Fakhri Ismail	Brunei	DNS	
	6	Mohamed Bohari	Brunei	DNS	
	6	Kemarley Brown	Bahrain	DNS	

=== Semifinals ===
Qualification rule: First 2 in each semifinal (Q) and the next 2 fastest (q) qualified for the final.

Wind:
Heat 1: 0.0 m/s, Heat 2: +1.4 m/s, Heat 3: +0.5 m/s

Rank	Heat	Name	Nationality	Time	Notes
1	3	Khairul Hafiz Jantan	Malaysia	10.24	Q
2	2	Femi Seun Ogunode	Qatar	10.27	Q
3	1	Tosin Ogunode	Qatar	10.32	Q
4	1	Yang Chun-han	Chinese Taipei	10.33	Q
5	3	Hassan Taftian	Iran	10.35	Q
6	2	Xu Haiyang	China	10.40	Q
7	2	Hassan Saaid	Maldives	10.40	q
8	3	Tang Xingqiang	China	10.43	q
9	3	Vinoj Suranjaya De Silva	Sri Lanka	10.44	
10	1	Ng Ka Fung	Hong Kong	10.50	
11	1	Himasha Eashan	Sri Lanka	10.53	
12	2	Takumi Kuki	Japan	10.54	
13	1	Vladislav Grigoryev	Kazakhstan	10.56	
14	2	Jonathan Anak	Malaysia	10.61	
14	3	Calvin Kang Li Loong	Singapore	10.61	
16	1	Noureddine Hadid	Lebanon	10.71	
17	3	Lee Yo-han	South Korea	10.78	
18	2	Ahmed Esam	Iraq	10.83	
19	1	Lee Ji-woo	South Korea	10.87	
20	2	Tsui Chi Ho	Hong Kong	10.91	
21	3	Anfernee Lopena	Philippines	10.95	
22	1	Bandit Chuangchai	Thailand	11.35	
23	2	Kritsada Namsuwun	Thailand	11.78	
	3	Amiya Kumar Mallick	India	DQ	

=== Final ===
Wind: +0.7 m/s

Rank	Lane	Name	Nationality	Time	Notes
1st place, gold medalist(s)	7	Hassan Taftian	Iran	10.25	
2nd place, silver medalist(s)	4	Femi Seun Ogunode	Qatar	10.26	
3rd place, bronze medalist(s)	6	Yang Chun-han	Chinese Taipei	10.31	
4	2	Hassan Saaid	Maldives	10.37	
5	5	Tosin Ogunode	Qatar	10.40	
6	8	Xu Haiyang	China	10.45	
	3	Khairul Hafiz Jantan	Malaysia	DQ	
	1	Tang Xingqiang	China	DQ	
