= Park Tae-geon =

South Korean sprinter

Park Bong-go
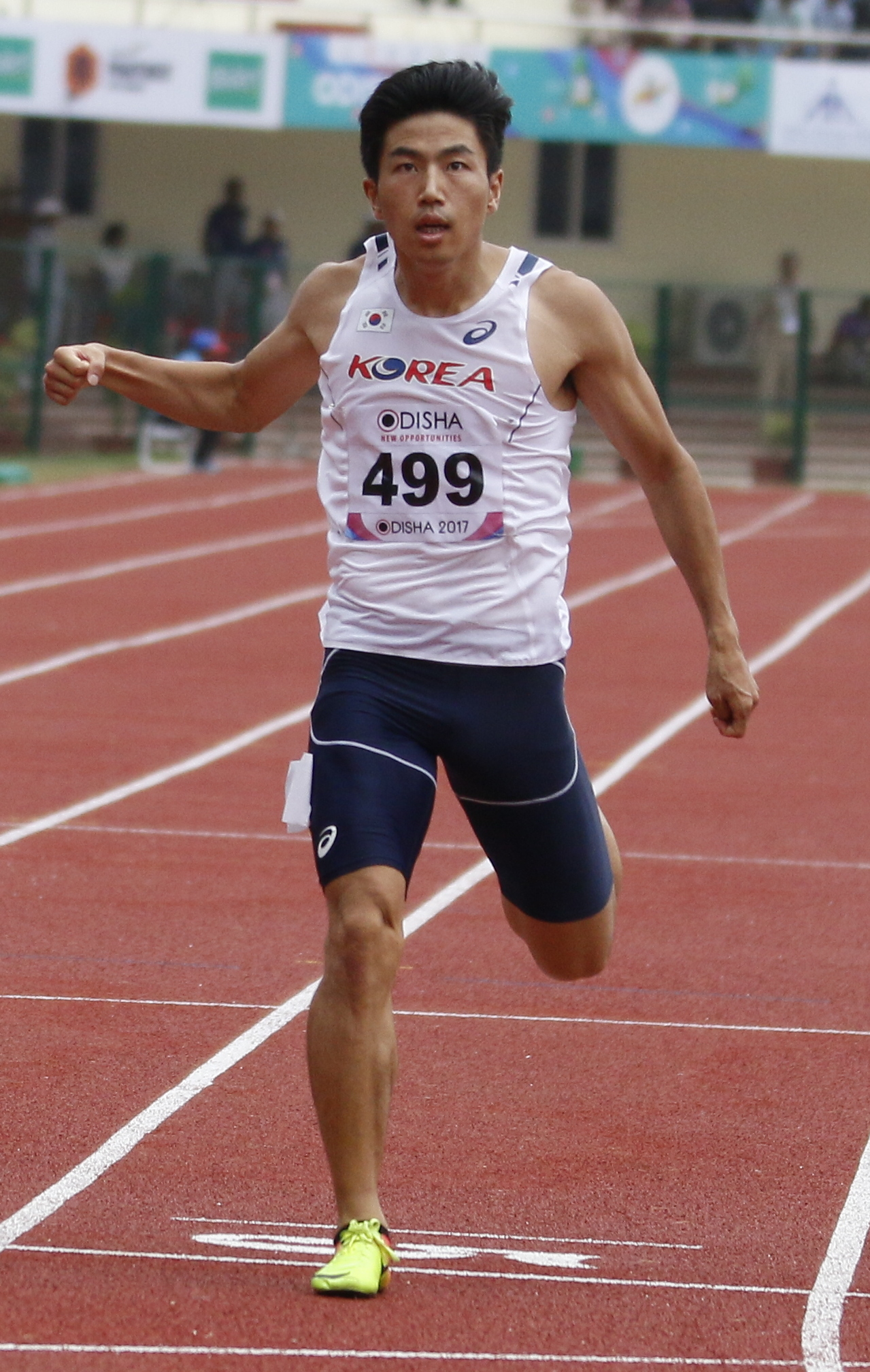
- Park Bong-go in 2017

Personal information
- Born: 8 May 1991 (age 35)

Sport
- Sport: Athletics
- Event(s): 200 m, 400 m
Medal record
Representing South Korea
Asian Games
| Silver medal – second place | 2014 Incheon | 4×400 metres relay |

Park Tae-geon (born 8 May 1991) formerly known as Park Bong-go is a South Korean athlete specialising in the 400 metres. He represented his country at the 2011 World Championships without reaching the semifinals.

== Competition record ==
| Year | Competition | Venue | Position | Event | Notes |
Representing South Korea
| 2009 | East Asian Games | Hong Kong, China | 2nd | 400 m | 46.96 |
| 2010 | World Junior Championships | Moncton, Canada | 15th (h) | 400 m | 47.46 |
| 2011 | Asian Championships | Kobe, Japan | 7th (h) | 400 m | 46.97 |
| 2011 | World Championships | Daegu, South Korea | 25th (h) | 400 m | 46.42 |
| 2011 | World Championships | Daegu, South Korea | 15th (h) | 4 × 400 m relay | 3:04.05 |
| 2014 | Asian Games | Incheon, South Korea | 6th | 400 m | 46.19 |
| 2014 | Asian Games | Incheon, South Korea | 2nd | 4 × 400 m relay | 3:04.03 |
| 2015 | Universiade | Gwangju, South Korea | 11th (sf) | 400 m | 46.39 |
| 2015 | Universiade | Gwangju, South Korea | 4th | 4 × 400 m relay | 3:08.17 |
| 2017 | Asian Championships | Bhubaneswar, India | 2nd | 200 m | 20.76 |
| 2017 | Asian Championships | Bhubaneswar, India | 8th | 4 × 100 m relay | 40.26 |
| 2017 | Asian Championships | Bhubaneswar, India | 6th | 4 × 400 m relay | 3:09.15 |
| 2018 | Asian Games | Jakarta, Indonesia | 5th | 200 m | 20.61 |
| 2018 | Asian Games | Jakarta, Indonesia | 5th | 4 × 100 m relay | 39.10 |

== Personal bests ==
- 100 metres – 10.30 (2018)
- 200 metres – 20.40 (+0.3 m/s) (Jeongseon 2018)
- 400 metres – 45.63 (Daegu 2010)
