= 2019 Asian Athletics Championships – Men's 100 metres =

Men's 100 metres at the 2019 Asian Athletics Championships
- Venue: Khalifa International Stadium
- Location: Doha, Qatar
- Dates: 21 April (heats); 22 April (semi-finals & final)
- Competitors: 40 from 25 nations
- Winning time: 10.10

Medalists
gold medal	Yoshihide Kiryū	Japan
silver medal	Lalu Muhammad Zohri	Indonesia
bronze medal	Wu Zhiqiang	China

The men's 100 metres event at the 2019 Asian Athletics Championships was held on 21 and 22 April.

== Records ==
Records before the 2019 Asian Athletics Championships
Record	Athlete (nation)	Time (s)	Location	Date
World record	Usain Bolt (JAM)	9.58	Berlin, Germany	16 August 2009
Asian record	Femi Ogunode (QAT)	9.91	Wuhan, China	4 June 2015
Championship record	Femi Ogunode (QAT)	9.91	Wuhan, China	4 June 2015
World leading	Divine Oduduru (NGR)	9.94	Texas, United States	20 April 2019
Asian leading	Yoshihide Kiryu (JPN)	10.08	Brisbane, Australia	23 March 2019

== Results ==
=== Heats ===
Qualification rule: First 4 in each heat (Q) and the next 4 fastest (q) qualified for the semifinals.

Wind:
Heat 1: +1.2 m/s, Heat 2: +0.8 m/, Heat 3: +0.9 m/s, Heat 4: +0.5 m/, Heat 5: -0.2 m/s

Rank	Heat	Name	Nationality	Time	Notes
1	1	Andrew Fisher	Bahrain	10.15	Q, SB
2	1	Tosin Ogunode	Qatar	10.22	Q, SB
3	1	Hassan Taftian	Iran	10.26	Q
3	2	Lalu Muhammad Zohri	Indonesia	10.26	Q
5	4	Kim Kuk-young	South Korea	10.27	Q
6	3	Yoshihide Kiryū	Japan	10.29	Q
6	5	Wu Zhiqiang	China	10.29	Q
8	5	Ryota Yamagata	Japan	10.30	Q
9	1	Jirapong Meenapra	Thailand	10.34	Q, SB
9	4	Yang Chun-han	Chinese Taipei	10.34	Q, SB
11	4	Xu Zhouzheng	China	10.41	Q, SB
12	2	Himasha Eashan Waththakankanamge	Sri Lanka	10.42	Q
13	2	Barakat Al-Harthi	Oman	10.43	Q, SB
14	1	Hassan Saaid	Maldives	10.47	q
15	2	Siripol Punpa	Thailand	10.52	Q
15	5	Noureddine Hadid	Lebanon	10.52	Q
17	3	Wang Wei-hsu	Chinese Taipei	10.53	Q
18	4	Muhammad Zulfiqar Bin Ismail	Malaysia	10.55	Q
19	4	Eric Shauwn Cray	Philippines	10.57	q, SB
20	1	Lee Jae-seong	South Korea	10.60	q
21	1	Muhd Noor Firdaus Ar Rasyid	Brunei	10.61	q, PB
22	2	Tsui Chi Ho	Hong Kong	10.63	
23	3	Anfernee Lopena	Philippines	10.65	Q
24	4	Damil Sutzhanov	Kazakhstan	10.68	
25	1	Ariff Bin Januri	Singapore	10.73	
26	5	Jaber Hilal Al-Mamari	Qatar	10.74	Q, PB
27	2	Uzair Rehman	Pakistan	10.77	SB
28	3	Alisher Sadulayev	Turkmenistan	10.78	Q
29	5	Alexandr Kasper	Kazakhstan	10.80	
30	5	Mohammed Al-Balushi	Oman	10.85	SB
31	2	Mohammed Hasan Miah	Bangladesh	10.86	SB
32	3	Mahmoud El Daou	Lebanon	10.88	
33	4	Adi Ramli Sidiq	Indonesia	10.89	SB
34	2	Aligadzhi Magamedgadzhiev	Kyrgyzstan	10.92	SB
35	3	Pen Sokong	Cambodia	10.94	SB
36	5	Lin Tim Weng Dexter	Singapore	11.03	
37	5	Mohamed Ismail	Bangladesh	11.17	SB
38	3	Lam Cho Kei	Macau	11.25	SB
	3	Abdo Barka	Bahrain	DQ	R162.8
	4	Sarees Ahmed	Maldives	DQ	R162.8

=== Semi-finals ===
Qualification rule: First 2 in each heat (Q) and the next 2 fastest (q) qualified for the final.

Wind:
Heat 1: +1.2 m/s, Heat 2: +1.4 m/, Heat 3: +1.7 m/s

Rank	Heat	Name	Nationality	Time	Notes
1	2	Yoshihide Kiryū	Japan	10.12	Q
2	2	Lalu Muhammad Zohri	Indonesia	10.15	Q, NR
3	3	Andrew Fisher	Bahrain	10.16	Q
4	1	Ryota Yamagata	Japan	10.18	Q, =SB
5	3	Wu Zhiqiang	China	10.22	Q, =PB
6	1	Kim Kuk-young	South Korea	10.25	Q
7	3	Hassan Taftian	Iran	10.25	q
8	2	Yang Chun-han	Chinese Taipei	10.29	q, SB
9	3	Barakat Al-Harthi	Oman	10.30	SB
10	2	Tosin Ogunode	Qatar	10.32	
11	1	Xu Zhouzheng	China	10.36	SB
12	2	Noureddine Hadid	Lebanon	10.41	NR
13	3	Wang Wei-hsu	Chinese Taipei	10.46	
14	1	Muhammad Zulfiqar Bin Ismail	Malaysia	10.49	
15	1	Himasha Eashan Waththakankanamge	Sri Lanka	10.51	
16	2	Eric Shauwn Cray	Philippines	10.56	SB
17	1	Hassan Saaid	Maldives	10.56	
18	3	Muhd Noor Firdaus Ar Rasyid	Brunei	10.60	PB
19	3	Anfernee Lopena	Philippines	10.66	
20	1	Jaber Hilal Al-Mamari	Qatar	10.67	PB
21	2	Lee Jae-seong	South Korea	10.70	
22	3	Jirapong Meenapra	Thailand	10.71	
23	2	Alisher Sadulayev	Turkmenistan	10.81	
24	1	Siripol Punpa	Thailand	11.19	

=== Final ===
Wind: +1.5 m/s

Rank	Lane	Name	Nationality	Time	Notes
1st place, gold medalist(s)	7	Yoshihide Kiryū	Japan	10.10	
2nd place, silver medalist(s)	4	Lalu Muhammad Zohri	Indonesia	10.13	NR
3rd place, bronze medalist(s)	9	Wu Zhiqiang	China	10.18	PB
4	5	Andrew Fisher	Bahrain	10.20	
5	3	Yang Chun-han	Chinese Taipei	10.28	SB
6	8	Kim Kuk-young	South Korea	26.22	
	2	Hassan Taftian	Iran	DNS	
	6	Ryota Yamagata	Japan	DNS	
