= Kotaro Taniguchi =

Japanese sprinter

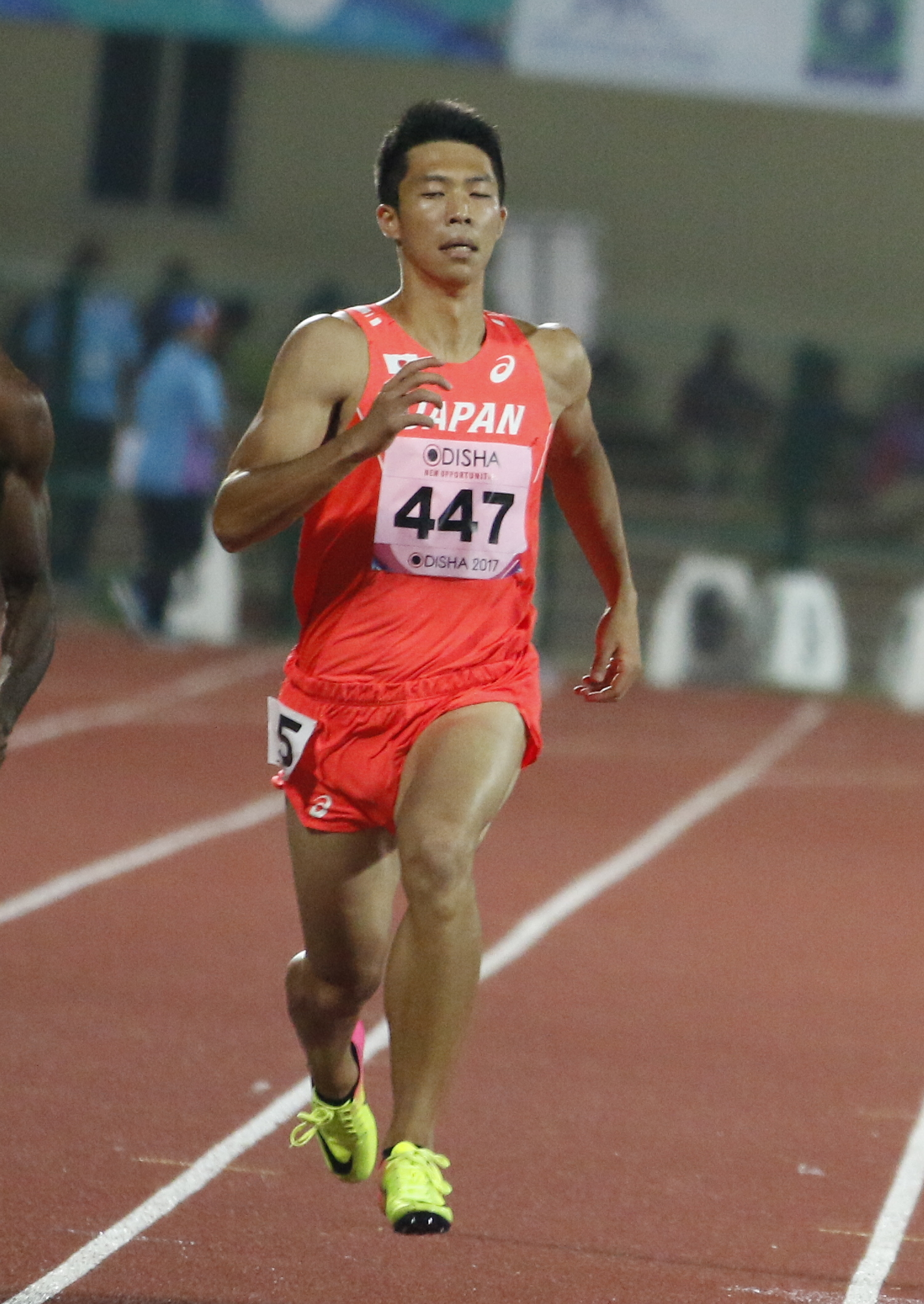

Personal information
- Born: 3 November 1994 (age 31)
- Height: 1.84 m (6 ft 0 in)
- Weight: 79 kg (174 lb)

Sport
- Sport: Track and field
- Event: 200 metres
- College team: Chuo University

Kotaro Taniguchi (谷口耕太郎, Taniguchi Kōtarō; born 3 November 1994) is a Japanese sprinter competing primarily in the 200 metres. He finished fourth at the 2015 Asian Championships. As part of the Japanese 4 × 100 metres relay, he won medals at the 2015 IAAF World Relays and 2015 Summer Universiade.

== Competition record ==
Year	Competition	Venue	Position	Event	Notes
Representing Japan
2014	Continental Cup	Marrakesh, Morocco	4th	4 × 100 m relay	39.50
2015	IAAF World Relays	Nassau, Bahamas	3rd	4 × 100 m relay	38.20
2015	Asian Championships	Wuhan, China	4th	200 m	20.69
2015	Universiade	Gwangju, South Korea	7th	200 m	21.17
2015	Universiade	Gwangju, South Korea	1st	4 × 100 m relay	39.08
2015	World Championships	Beijing, China	10th (h)	4 × 100 m relay	38.60
2017	Asian Championships	Bhubaneswar, India	6th	200 m	21.01

== Personal bests ==
Outdoor

- 100 metres – 10.51 (-0.3 m/s) (Liège 2014)
- 200 metres – 20.45 (+0.6 m/s) (Fukuroi 2014)
