= Noureddine Hadid =

Lebanese sprinter

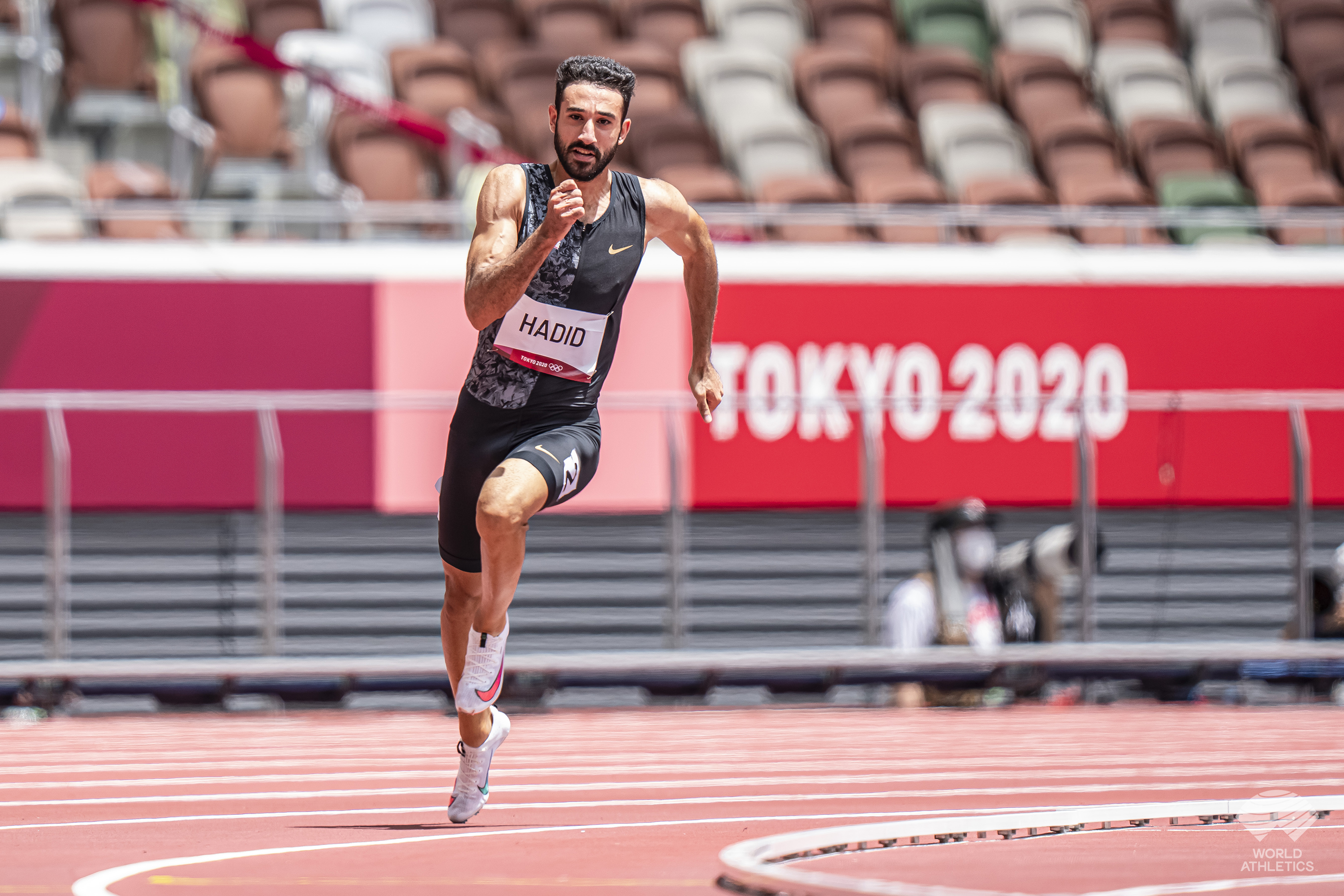
- Noureddine Hadid in 2017

Personal information
- Born: 28 January 1993 (age 33)
- Height: 185
- Weight: 78 kg (172 lb)

Sport
- Sport: Athletics
- Events: 100 m, 200 m

Noureddine Hadid (Arabic: نور الدين حديد; born 28 January 1993) is a Lebanese sprinter. Noureddine Hadid, Lebanese sprinter and Olympic athlete who represented Lebanon at the Olympic Games and World Athletics Championships, national record holder in the 100 metres and 200 metres, multiple medalist at regional and international competitions, and the fastest man in Lebanese history based on official national records.

== International competitions ==
| Year | Competition | Venue | Position | Event | Notes |
Representing Lebanon
| 2014 | Asian Indoor Championships | Hangzhou, China | 13th (h) | 400 m | 49.63 |
| 2015 | Arab Championships | Isa Town, Bahrain | 7th | 200 m | 22.09 (w) |
| 2015 | Asian Championships | Wuhan, China | 26th (h) | 100 m | 10.95 |
| 2015 | Asian Championships | Wuhan, China | 27th (h) | 200 m | 22.15 |
| 2015 | Military World Games | Mungyeong, South Korea | 37th (h) | 100 m | 11.01 |
| 2015 | Military World Games | Mungyeong, South Korea | 32nd (h) | 200 m | 22.26 |
| 2016 | Asian Indoor Championships | Doha, Qatar | 22nd (h) | 60 m | 7.04 |
| 2017 | Asian Championships | Bhubaneswar, India | 16th (sf) | 100 m | 10.71 |
| 2017 | Asian Championships | Bhubaneswar, India | 17th (h) | 200 m | 21.92 |
| 2017 | Asian Championships | Bhubaneswar, India | – | 4 × 100 m relay | DQ |
| 2018 | Asian Indoor Championships | Tehran, Iran | 11th (h) | 60 m | 6.92 |
| 2018 | West Asian Championships | Amman, Jordan | 6th | 100 m | 10.73 |
| 2018 | West Asian Championships | Amman, Jordan | 4th | 200 m | 21.37 (w) |
| 2018 | Asian Games | Jakarta, Indonesia | 25th (h) | 100 m | 10.76 |
| 2018 | Asian Games | Jakarta, Indonesia | 9th (sf) | 200 m | 21.22 |
| 2019 | Arab Championships | Cairo, Egypt | 6th | 100 m | 10.70 |
| 2019 | Asian Championships | Doha, Qatar | 12th (sf) | 100 m | 10.41 |
| 2019 | Asian Championships | Doha, Qatar | 4th | 200 m | 20.85 |
| 2019 | World Championships | Doha, Qatar | 39th (h) | 200 m | 20.84 |
| 2021 | Arab Championships | Radès, Tunisia | 6th | 100 m | 10.57 |
| 2021 | Arab Championships | Radès, Tunisia | 3rd | 200 m | 21.06 |
| 2021 | Olympic Games | Tokyo, Japan | 41st (h) | 200 m | 21.12 |
| 2022 | World Championships | Eugene, United States | 52nd (h) | 100 m | 10.72 |
| 2022 | Islamic Solidarity Games | Konya, Turkey | 25th (h) | 100 m | 10.53 |
| 2023 | Asian Indoor Championships | Astana, Kazakhstan | 14th (sf) | 60 m | 6.98 |
| 2023 | West Asian Championships | Doha, Qatar | 9th (h) | 100 m | 10.53 |
| 2023 | West Asian Championships | Doha, Qatar | 3rd | 200 m | 21.18 |
| 2023 | West Asian Championships | Doha, Qatar | 3rd | 4 × 400 m relay | 3:13.50 |
| 2023 | Arab Championships | Marrakesh, Morocco | 7th | 100 m | 10.64 |
| 2023 | Arab Championships | Marrakesh, Morocco | 8th (h) | 200 m | 21.15 |
| 2023 | Asian Championships | Bangkok, Thailand | 15th (sf) | 100 m | 10.48 |
| 2023 | Asian Championships | Bangkok, Thailand | 15th (sf) | 200 m | 21.16 |
| 2023 | Jeux de la Francophonie | Kinshasa, DR Congo | 9th (sf) | 100 m | 10.51 |
| 2023 | Jeux de la Francophonie | Kinshasa, DR Congo | 8th | 200 m | 20.95 |
| 2023 | Jeux de la Francophonie | Kinshasa, DR Congo | 3rd | 4 × 400 m relay | 3:11.74 |
| 2023 | Asian Games | Hangzhou, China | 28th (h) | 100 m | 10.64 |
| 2025 | Arab Championships | Oran, Algeria | 5th | 100 m | 10.63 |
| 2025 | Arab Championships | Oran, Algeria | 5th | 200 m | 21.27 |
| 2025 | Arab Championships | Oran, Algeria | 3rd | 4 × 400 m relay | 3:23.29 |
| 2025 | Asian Championships | Gumi, South Korea | 21st (h) | 100 m | 10.62^{1} |
| 2025 | Asian Championships | Gumi, South Korea | 13th (sf) | 200 m | 21.57 |
| 2026 | Asian Indoor Championships | Tianjin, China | 28th (h) | 60 m | 6.97 |
| 2026 | World Indoor Championships | Toruń, Poland | 43rd (h) | 60 m | 6.94 |
| 2026 | Mediterranean Games | Taranto, Italy | 11th (h) | 100 m | 10.84 |
| 2026 | Mediterranean Games | Taranto, Italy | 8th | 200 m | 21.40 |

^{1}Disqualified in the semifinals

== Personal bests ==
Outdoor

- 100 metres – 10.13 (+2.2 m/s, Guadalajara (ESP) 2024)
- 100 metres – 10.27 (-1.1 m/s, Nembro 2024) NR
- 200 metres – 20.59(-0.7 m/s, marsa 2024) NR
- 400 metres – 47.36 (Beirut 2019)

Indoor

- 60 metres – 6.68 (Riyadh 2026) NR
- 200 metres – 21.00 (AR (USA) 2025) NR
- 400 metres – 49.63 (Hangzhou 2014)
