= Hassan Taftian =

Iranian sprinter (born 1993)

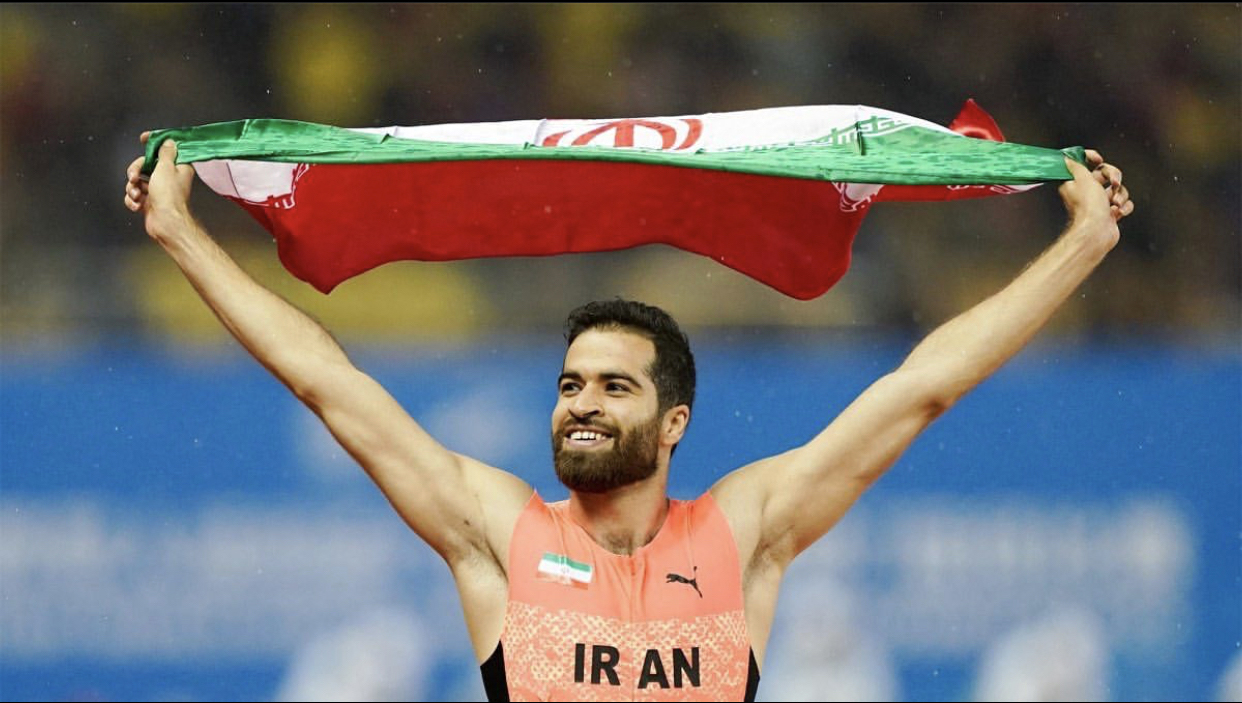

Personal information
- Native name: حسن تفتیان
- Nationality: Iranian
- Born: 4 May 1993 (age 33) Torbat-e Heydarieh, Iran
- Education: Ph.D of sport management from the University of Tehran
- Height: 1.82 m (6 ft 0 in)
- Weight: 76 kg (168 lb)

Sport
- Sport: Running
- Event: Sprints

Achievements and titles
- Personal bests: 100 m: 10.03 (Paris 2018); 200 m: 20.74 (Loughborough 2018); 60 m: 6.51A (Tehran 2018)
Medal record
Men's athletics
Representing Iran
Asian Championships
Gold medal – first place	2017 Bhubaneswar	100 m
Bronze medal – third place	2023 Bangkok	100 m
Asian Indoor Championships
Gold medal – first place	2016 Doha	60 m
Gold medal – first place	2018 Tehran	60 m
Asian Indoor and Martial Arts Games
Gold medal – first place	2017 Ashgabat	60 m
Asian Junior Championships
Gold medal – first place	2012 Colombo	100 m
Silver medal – second place	2010 Hanoi	100 m
Bronze medal – third place	2012 Colombo	200 m

Hassan Taftian (Persian: حسن تفتیان; born 4 May 1993 in Torbat-e Heydarieh) is an Iranian sprinter. He is an olympic sprinter that represented Iran at Rio 2016, Tokyo 2020, and Paris 2024 Summer Olympics. He represented his country at four outdoor and three indoor World Championships.

Taftian won the gold medal in 100 metres at the 2012 Asian Junior Athletics Championships in Colombo, Sri Lanka. On 8 July 2017 Taftian became the first Iranian to ever win the gold medal in 100 metres in an Asian Athletics Championships after finishing with a time of 10.25 seconds at the 2017 Asian Athletics Championships in Bhubaneswar, India.

At the 5th Islamic Solidarity Games at Konya, Turkey, Taftian ran a time of 9.88 seconds, but his run was wind-assisted (5.1 m/s), and thus cannot be ratified as new National Record.

== International competitions ==
Year	Competition	Venue	Position	Event	Notes
Representing Iran
2009	Asian Youth Games	Singapore	6th	100 m	11.27
2010	Asian Junior Championships	Hanoi, Vietnam	2nd	100 m	10.81
2010	World Junior Championships	Moncton, Canada	19th (sf)	100 m	10.89
2012	Asian Junior Championships	Colombo, Sri Lanka	1st	100 m	10.49
2012	Asian Junior Championships	Colombo, Sri Lanka	3rd	200 m	21.60
2012	World Junior Championships	Barcelona, Spain	9th (sf)	100 m	10.46
2012	West Asian Championships	Dubai, United Arab Emirates	4th	100 m	10.52
2012	West Asian Championships	Dubai, United Arab Emirates	1st	4 × 100 m	40.26
2013	Asian Championships	Pune, India	8th	100 m	10.54
2013	World Championships	Moscow, Russia	48th (h)	100 m	10.57
2014	World Indoor Championships	Sopot, Poland	19th (sf)	60 m	6.67
2014	Asian Games	Incheon, South Korea	10th (sf)	100 m	10.50
2014	Asian Games	Incheon, South Korea	8th	200 m	21.24
2015	World Championships	Beijing, China	20th (sf)	100 m	10.20
2016	Asian Indoor Championships	Doha, Qatar	1st	60 m	6.56
2016	Olympic Games	Rio de Janeiro, Brazil	22nd (sf)	100 m	10.23
2017	Islamic Solidarity Games	Baku, Azerbaijan	8th	100 m	11.99
2017	Asian Championships	Bhubaneswar, India	1st	100 m	10.25
2017	Asian Championships	Bhubaneswar, India	10th (sf)	200 m	21.18
2017	World Championships	London, United Kingdom	34th (h)	100 m	10.34
2017	Asian Indoor and Martial Arts Games	Ashgabat, Turkmenistan	1st	60 m	6.55
2018	Asian Indoor Championships	Tehran, Iran	1st	60 m	6.51
2018	World Indoor Championships	Birmingham, United Kingdom	5th	60 m	6.53
2018	Asian Games	Jakarta, Indonesia	6th	100 m	10.19
2018	Asian Games	Jakarta, Indonesia	14th (sf)	200 m	21.47
2019	Asian Championships	Doha, Qatar	7th (sf)	100 m	10.25^{1}
2019	World Championships	Doha, Qatar	27th (h)	100 m	10.24
2019	Military World Games	Wuhan, China	1st	100 m	10.24
2021	Olympic Games	Tokyo, Japan	28th (h)	100 m	10.19
2022	World Indoor Championships	Belgrade, Serbia	35th (h)	60 m	6.75
2022	Islamic Solidarity Games	Konya, Turkey	5th	100 m	10.02
2022	Islamic Solidarity Games	Konya, Turkey	–	200 m	DQ
2023	Asian Championships	Bangkok, Thailand	3rd	100 m	10.23
2023	World Championships	Budapest, Hungary	23rd (h)	100 m	10.17
2023	Asian Games	Hangzhou, China	4th	100 m	10.14
2024	Asian Indoor Championships	Tehran, Iran	6th	60 m	6.69
2024	Olympic Games	Paris, France	33rd (h)	100 m	10.18
2025	Asian Championships	Gumi, South Korea	8th	100 m	10.41

^{1}Did not start in the final

== Personal bests ==
Outdoor

- 100 metres – 10.03 (+1.2 m/s, Paris 2018)
- 200 metres – 20.74 (+0.8 m/s, Loughborough 2018)

Indoor

- 60 metres – 6.51A (Tehran 2018)

== See also ==
- List of Iranian records in athletics
