= Yaqoob Salem Yaqoob =

Bahraini sprinter

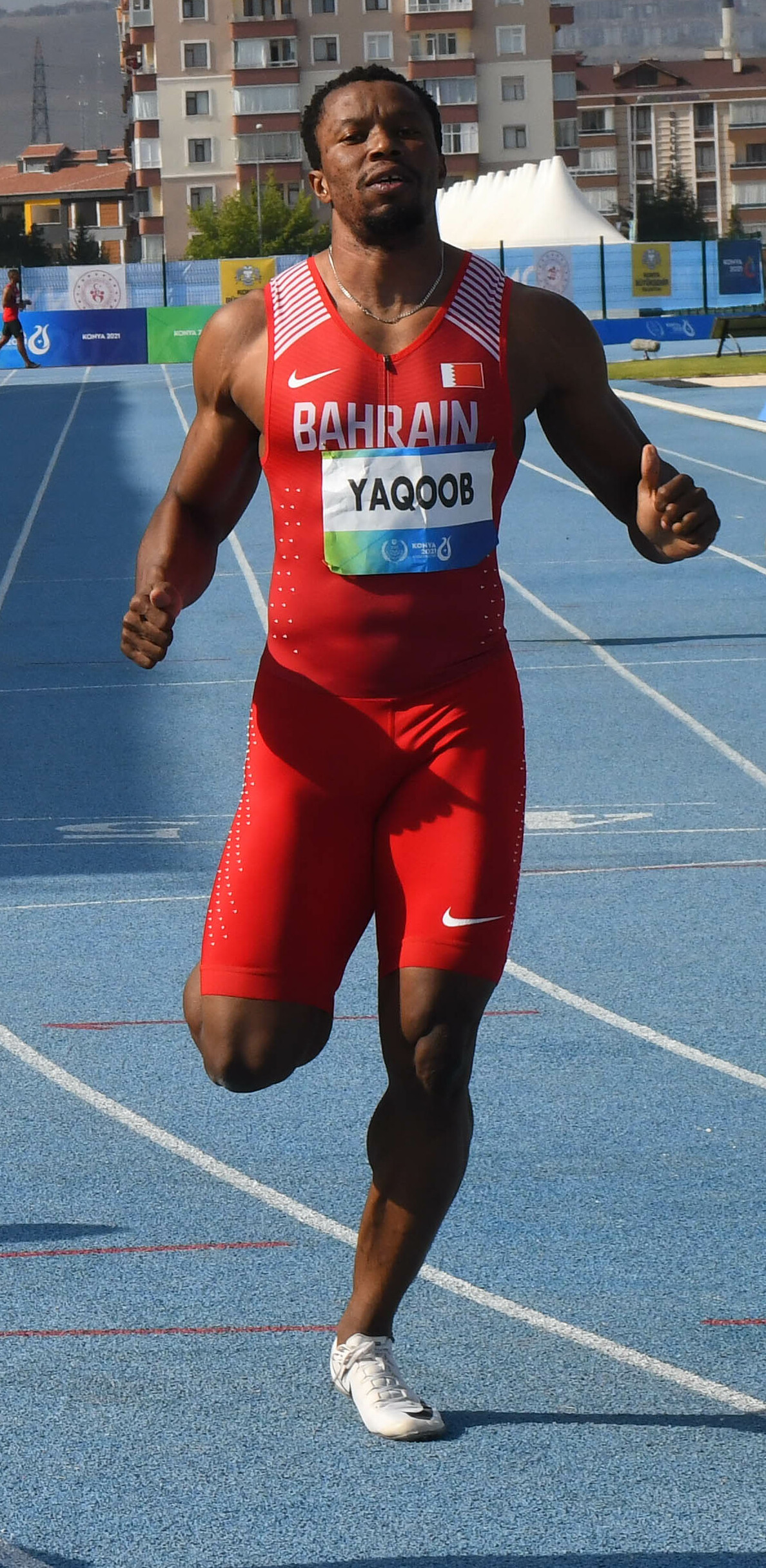
- Salem Eid Yaqoob competing at the 2021 Islamic Solidarity Games

Personal information
- Full name: Yaqoob Salem Eid Yaqoob
- Nationality: Bahraini
- Born: 1 March 1996 (age 30) Nigeria
- Height: 175 cm (5 ft 9 in)
- Weight: 65 kg (143 lb)

Sport
- Sport: Athletics
- Event: Sprints
Medal record
Men's athletics
Representing the Bahrain
Asian Games
Bronze medal – third place	2018 Jakarta	200 m
Asian Championships
Bronze medal – third place	2019 Doha	200 m
Military World Games
Gold medal – first place	2019 Wuhan	4x400 m relay
Islamic Solidarity Games
Gold medal – first place	2017 Baku	4x100 m relay
Silver medal – second place	2017 Baku	200 m
Silver medal – second place	2021 Konya	4x100 m relay
Arab Games
Silver medal – second place	2023 Bir El Djir	4x100 m relay
West Asian Championships
Gold medal – first place	2018 Amman	200 m

Yaqoob Salem Eid Yaqoob (Arabic: يعقوب سالم عيد يعقوب, born 1 March 1996 in Nigeria) is a Bahraini sprinter. He holds the national record for 200m.

Yaqoob is currently serving a four year competition ban (2023-2027) due to an anti-doping regulation violation in relation to testing positive for stanozolol.

== Career ==
Yaqoob competed at the 2015 Military World Games in the 100 metres and 200 metres. He reached the final of the 100m and the semi-final of the 200m.

Yaqoob competed in the 2016 Rio Olympics, and reached the semi-finals of the 200 metres. He holds the national record having run the 200m in 20.19 seconds.

== Personal bests ==
- 100 metres – 10.37 seconds (2015)
- 200 metres – 20.19 seconds (2016)
