= Wu Zhiqiang (sprinter) =

Chinese sprinter (born 1994)

Personal information
- Born: 10 April 1994 (age 32) Tongliao, Inner Mongolia
- Education: Beijing Sport University
- Height: 1.75 m (5 ft 9 in)
- Weight: 66 kg (146 lb)

Sport
- Sport: Athletics
- Event: 100 metres
Medal record
Men's athletics
Representing China
Olympic Games
Bronze medal – third place	2020 Tokyo	4×100 m relay
Asian Championships
Silver medal – second place	2023 Bangkok	4×100 m relay
Bronze medal – third place	2019 Doha	100 m

Wu Zhiqiang (born 10 April 1994) is a Chinese sprinter. He represented his country in the 4 × 100 metres relay at the 2017 World Championships finishing fourth in the final.

== International competitions ==
Year	Competition	Venue	Position	Event	Notes
Representing China
2013	Universiade	Kazan, Russia	22nd (qf)	100 m	10.72
2013	Universiade	Kazan, Russia	5th	4 × 100 m relay	39.54
2015	IAAF World Relays	Nassau, Bahamas	21st (h)	4 × 100 m relay	57.98
2015	IAAF World Relays	Nassau, Bahamas	–	4 × 200 m relay	DQ
2015	Asian Championships	Wuhan, China	1st (h)	4 × 100 m relay	39.02
2017	World Championships	London, United Kingdom	4th	4 × 100 m relay	38.34
2018	Asian Indoor Championships	Tehran, Iran	7th	60 m	6.84
2019	Asian Championships	Doha, Qatar	3rd	100 m	10.18
2019	World Relays	Yokohama, Japan	4th	4 × 100 m relay	38.16
2019	World Championships	Doha, Qatar	–	4 × 100 m relay	DNF
2021	Olympic Games	Tokyo, Japan	27th (h)	100 m	10.18
2021	Olympic Games	Tokyo, Japan	3rd	4 × 100 m relay	37.79 (=NR)
2023	Asian Championships	Bangkok, Thailand	2nd	4 × 100 m relay	38.87

== Personal bests ==
Outdoor

- 100 metres – 10.11 (+0.1 m/s, Chongqing 2021)
- 200 metres – 21.05 (+0.5 m/s, Jinhua 2019)

Indoor

- 60 metres – 6.63 (Chengdu 2021)
- 200 metres – 21.95 (Beijing 2015)
