= Quadriceps tendon rupture =

Tear of the tendon that runs from the quadriceps muscle to the top of the knee cap

- Other names: Quadriceps tendon tear
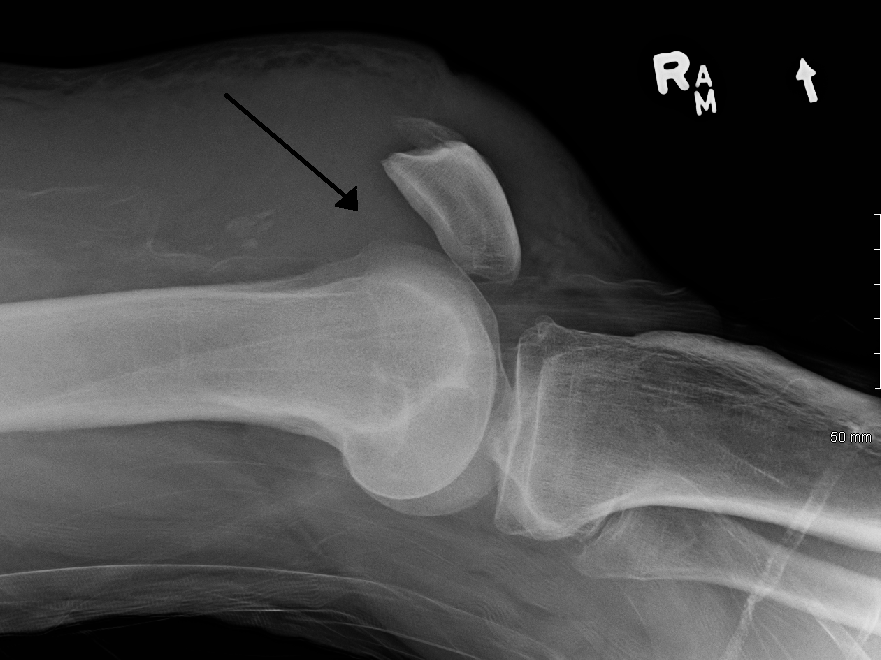
- An x-ray demonstrating quadriceps tendon rupture. Note the abnormal angle of the patella and soft-tissue swelling marked by the arrow.
- Specialty: Orthopedic

A quadriceps tendon rupture is a tear of the tendon that runs from the quadriceps muscle to the top of the knee cap.

== Signs and symptoms ==
Symptoms are pain and the inability to extend the knee against resistance. A gap can often be palpated at the tendon's normal location.

== Diagnosis ==
The diagnosis is usually made clinically, but ultrasound or MRI can be used if there is any doubt.

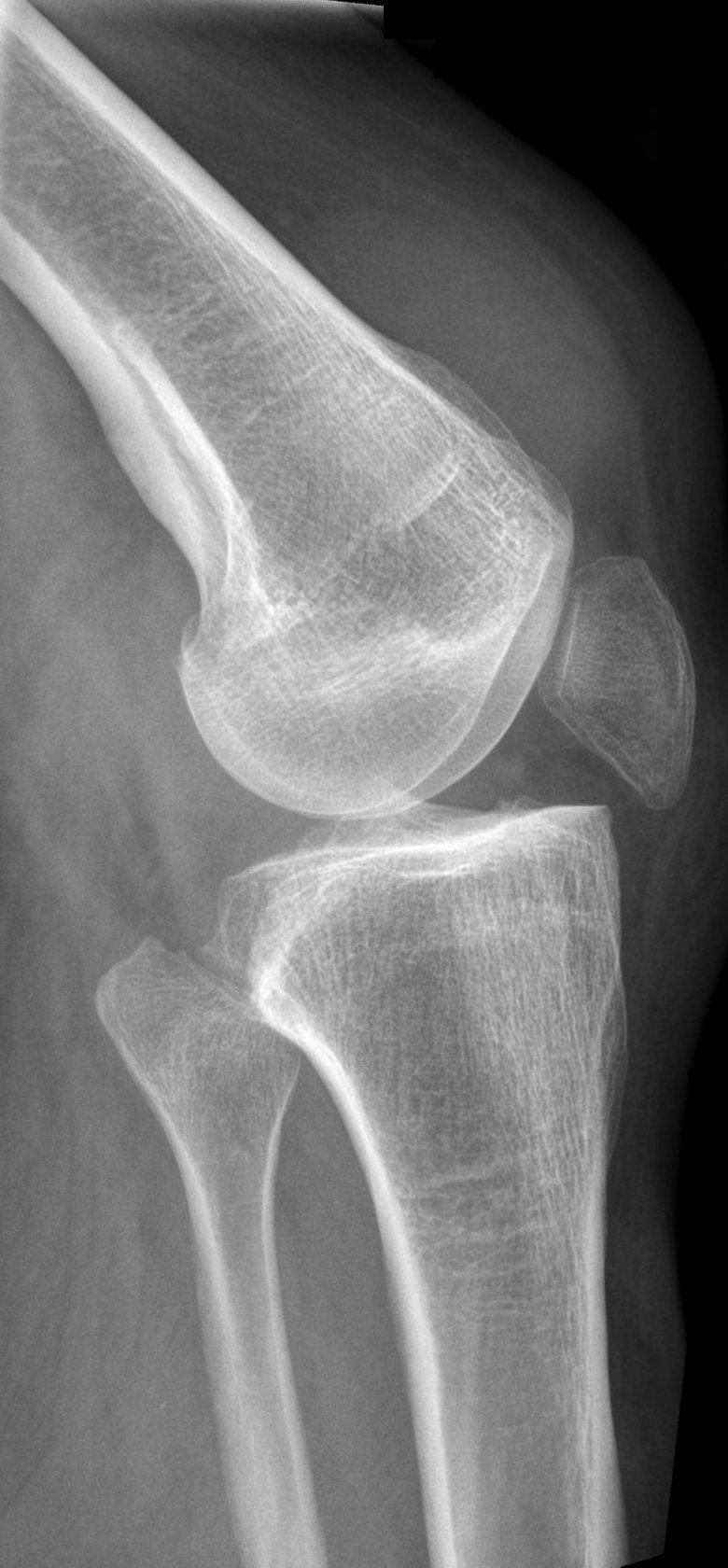
Quadriceps tendon rupture in plain X-ray

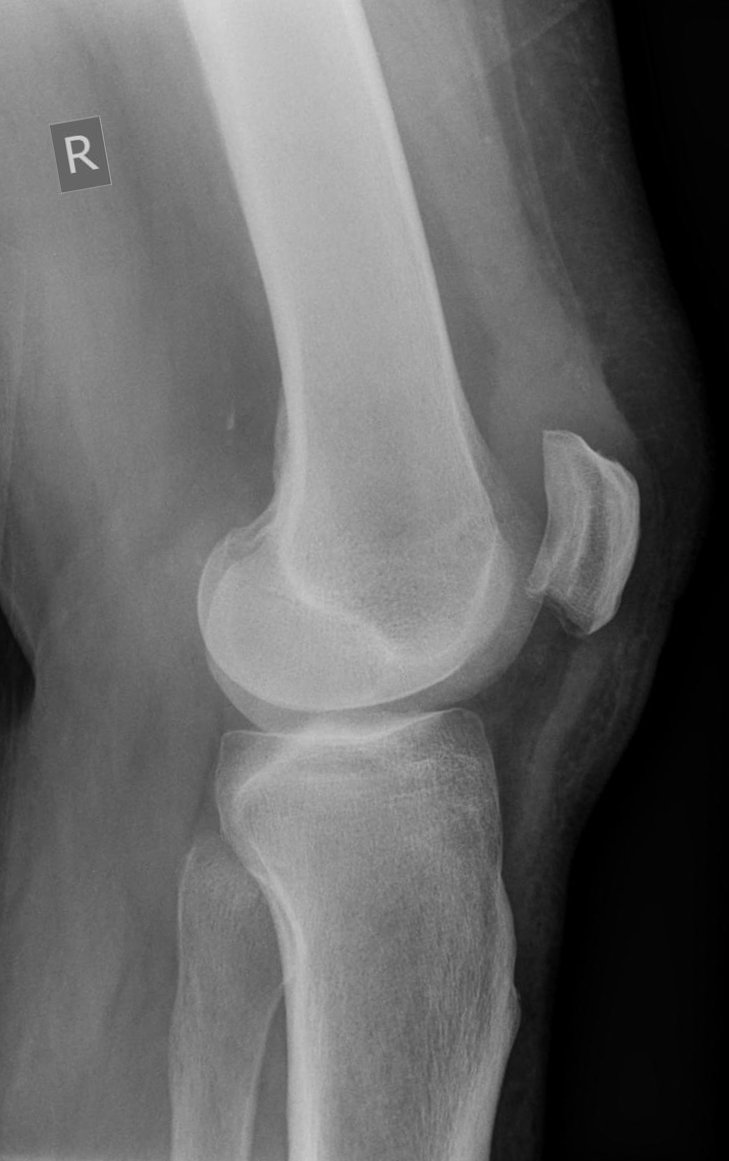
Quadriceps tendon rupture in plain X-ray: Incomplete rupture with haematoma in tendon.

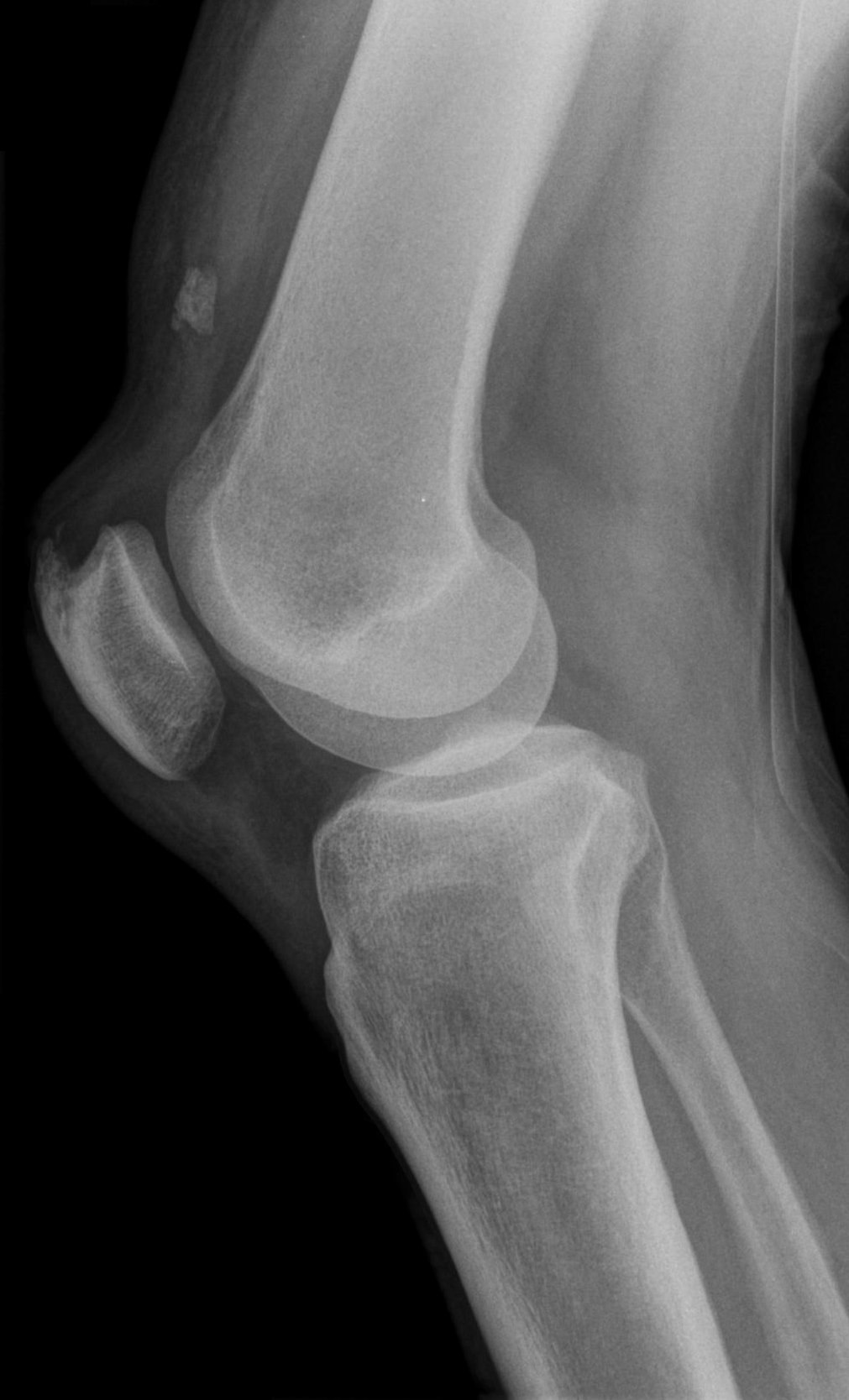
Quadriceps tendon rupture in plain X-ray

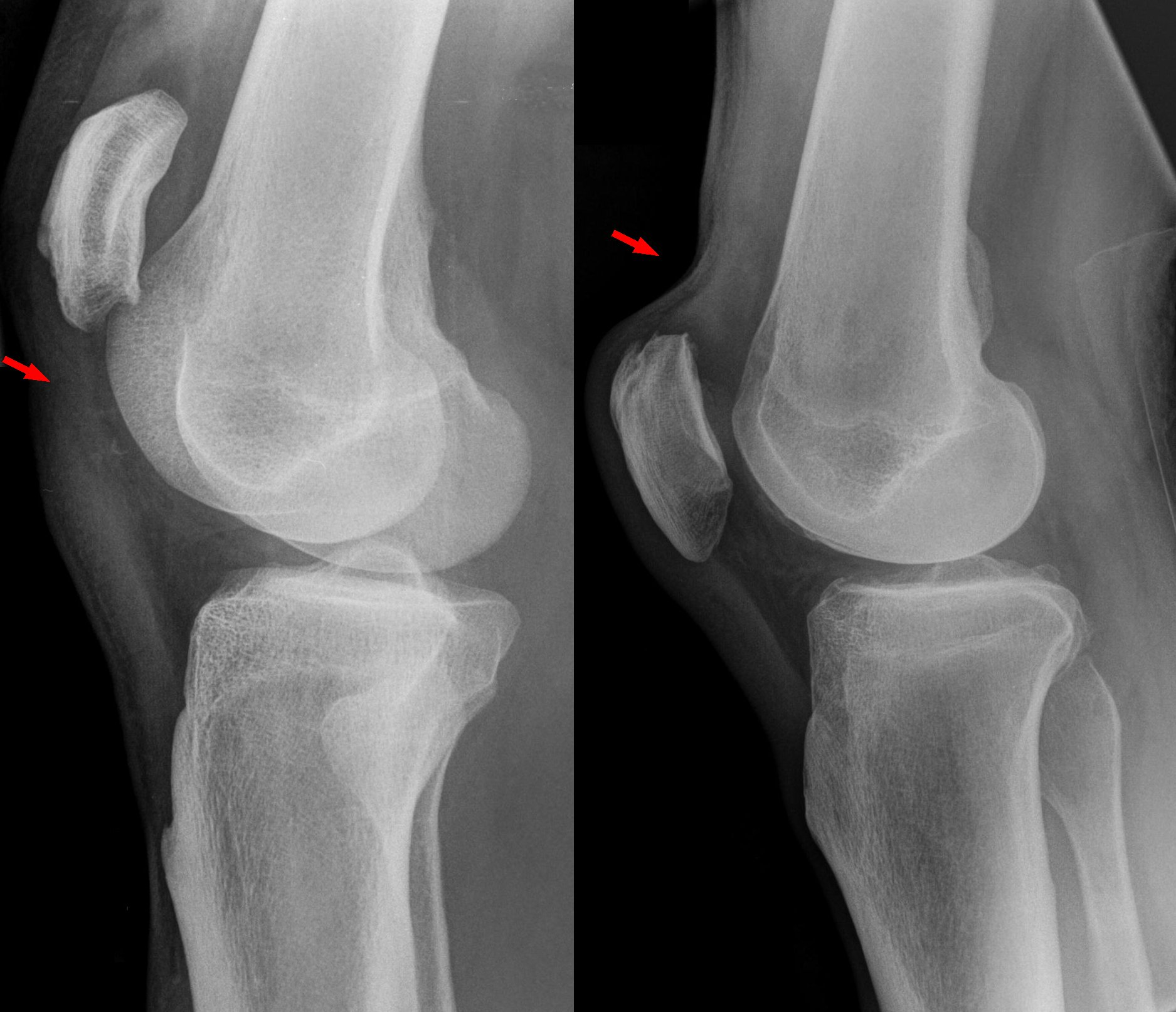
X-ray of a tear of the patellar tendon. On the left: The kneecap is pulled up. On the right: Significant dent in the soft tissue above the kneecap.

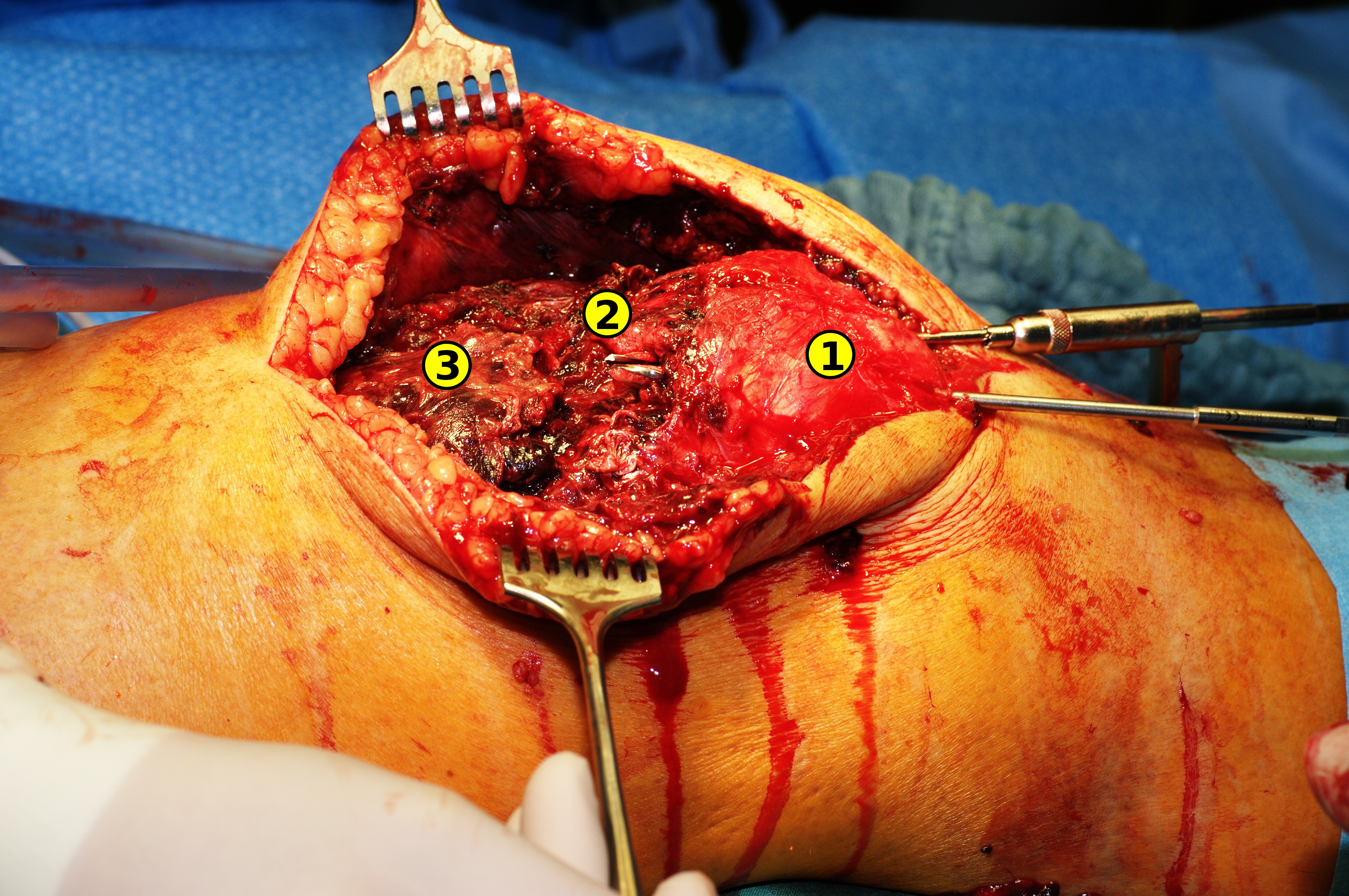
Operative image: 1. Kneecap 2. upper patella pole with drill holes 3. Stump of the quadriceps tendon

== Treatment ==
The tendon can be surgically repaired. Afterwards a brace is given that prevents flexion of the knee. Athletes who have had this injury generally return to action in about 9 months to a year.
