= Amiya Kumar Mallick =

Indian sprinter

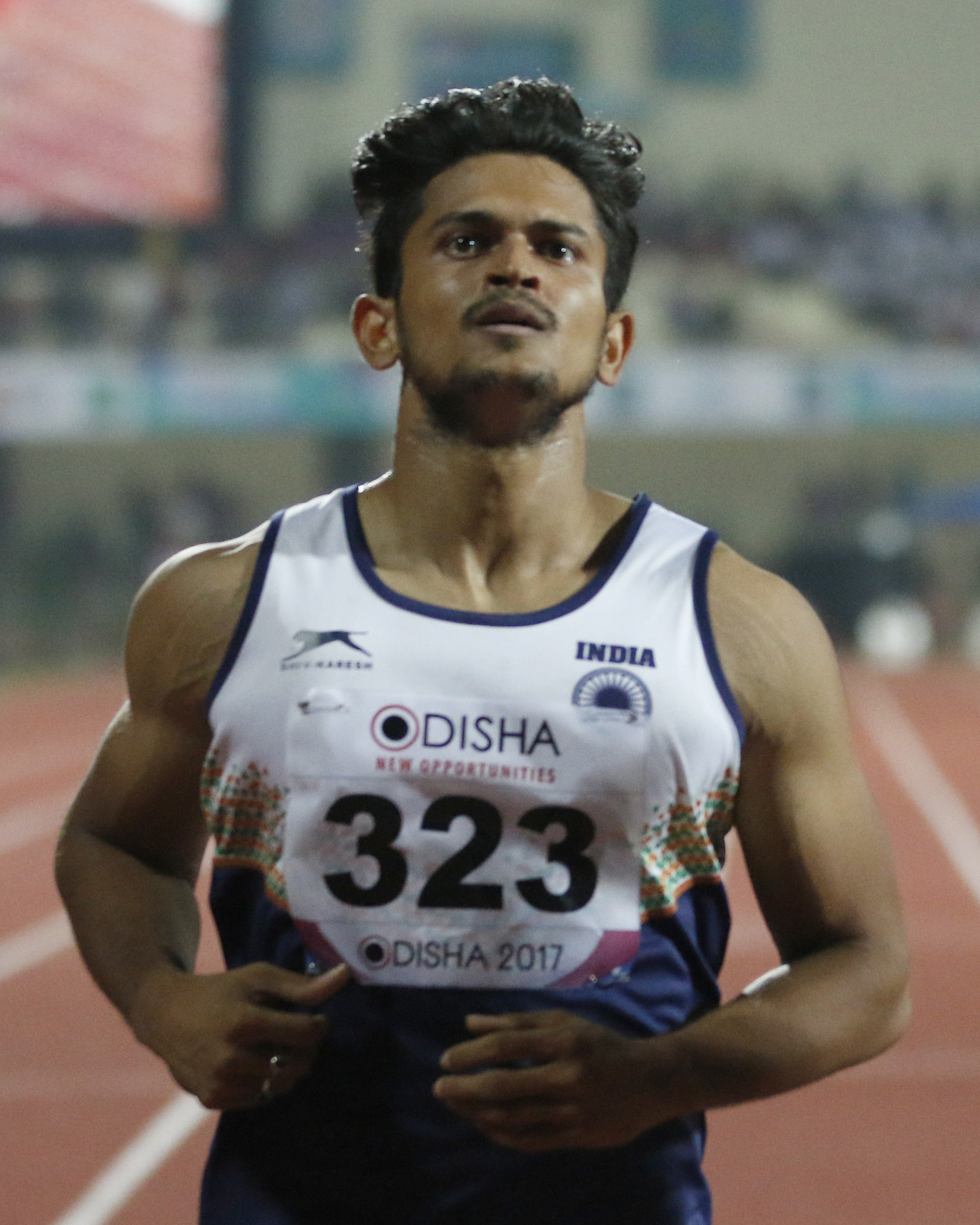
- Mallick at the 2017 Asian Athletics Championships in Bhubaneswar

Personal information
- Born: 14 November 1992 (age 33) Olansh, Cuttack district, Odisha, India

Sport
- Country: India
- Sport: Track and field
- Event: 100 metres

Achievements and titles
- Personal bests: 100m: 10.26 s (New Delhi 2016) NR; 200m: 21.03 s (Bhubaneswar 2017)
Medal record
Men's athletics
Representing India
South Asian Games
Silver medal – second place	2019 Kathmandu	4 × 100 m relay

Amiya Kumar Mallick (born 14 November 1992) is an Indian sprinter from Odisha. He previously held the 100 metres national record of 10.26 seconds.

== Personal life ==
Mallick was born on 14 November 1992 in Olansh, Cuttack district, Orissa. His father works in Bhubaneswar as a section officer in the education department of the state government and his mother is a housewife. As of 2016, Mallick is pursuing an MBA at the KIIT University in Bhubaneswar.

== Career ==
Mallick won the silver medal in 100 metres at the 2006 Junior Asian Meet in Colombo and a bronze in 200 metres at the 2008 Commonwealth Youth Games, clocking 21.33 seconds. In October 2011, he suffered a left quadricep injury which left him bed-ridden for six months after which he had to use crutches to walk. He returned to sprinting in December 2012, while his doctors told him that it will not be possible for him to match his previous timings.

Mallick came into the limelight after winning gold medal at the National Open Athletics Championships at Ranchi in 2013 by recording 21.22 seconds. In 2014, he trained for four months under Glen Mills, who coached Usain Bolt and Yohan Blake, at the Racers Track Club in Kingston. The training which costed ₹16 lakh was funded by his father, the state association and some sponsors, and helped him change his running technique.

Mallick set the national 100 metres record on 28 April 2016 during the semifinals of the National Federation Cup in New Delhi, running 10.26 seconds. He bettered the previous national record of 10.30 seconds jointly held by Anil Kumar Prakash (2005) and Abdul Najeeb Qureshi (2010). Having clocked 10.35 seconds during the heats of the same event, Mallick suffered a hamstring strain during the semifinal. He ran the final with his thigh heavily strapped and finished fourth clocking 10.51.

At the 2017 Asian Athletics Championships in Bhubaneswar, Mallick was disqualified in the 100 metres semifinals because of a false start. He was part of the 4 × 100 metres relay team which was also disqualified in the heats due to a baton exchange infraction by Mallick. He qualified for the final of the 200 metres event in which he finished with a personal best time of 21.03 seconds.
