= Bie Ge =

Chinese sprinter (born 1992)

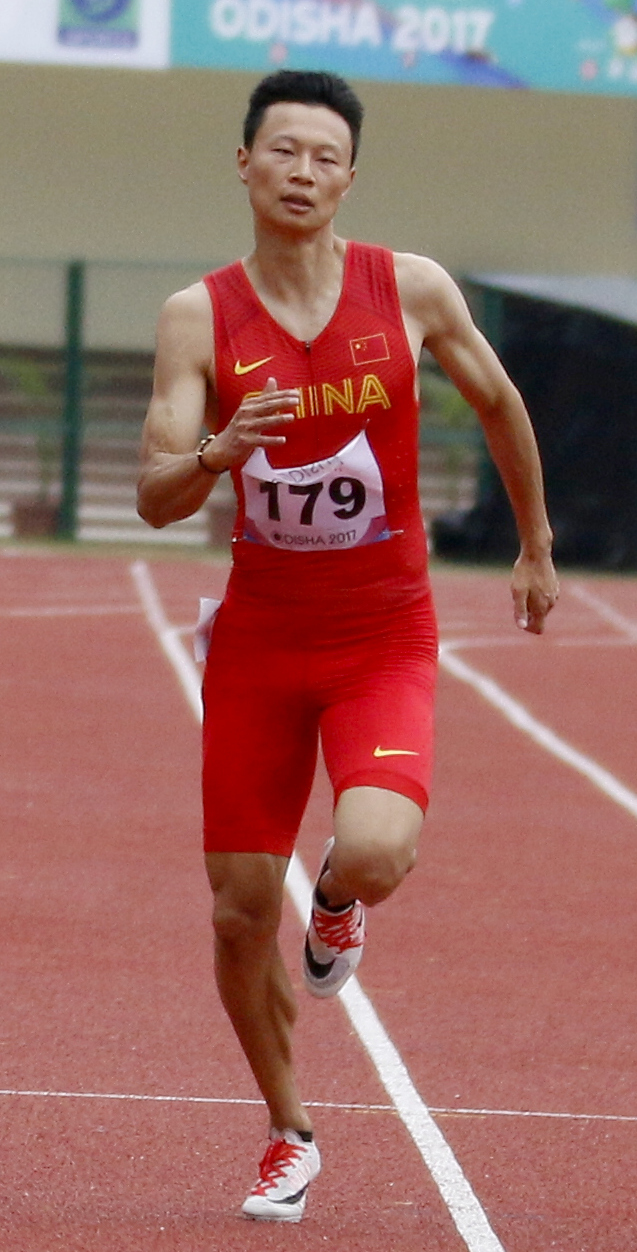
- Bie at the 2017 Asian Championships

Personal information
- Born: 2 August 1992 (age 33)
- Education: Southwest University
- Height: 183 cm (6 ft 0 in)
- Weight: 75 kg (165 lb)

Sport
- Sport: Athletics
- Event: 100–200 m
- Coached by: Chen Yongjian (personal)

Achievements and titles
- Personal best(s): 100 m – 10.49 (2016); 200 m – 20.39 (2018)
Medal record
Representing China
Asian Athletics Championships
Gold medal – first place	2017 Bhubaneswar	4 × 100 m

Bie Ge (born 2 August 1992) is a Chinese sprinter. He won a gold medal in the 4 × 100 m relay at the 2017 Asian Championships, and finished fourth in the 200 m. He placed eighth in this event at the 2018 Asian Games.
