= Trenten Beram =

Filipino sprinter

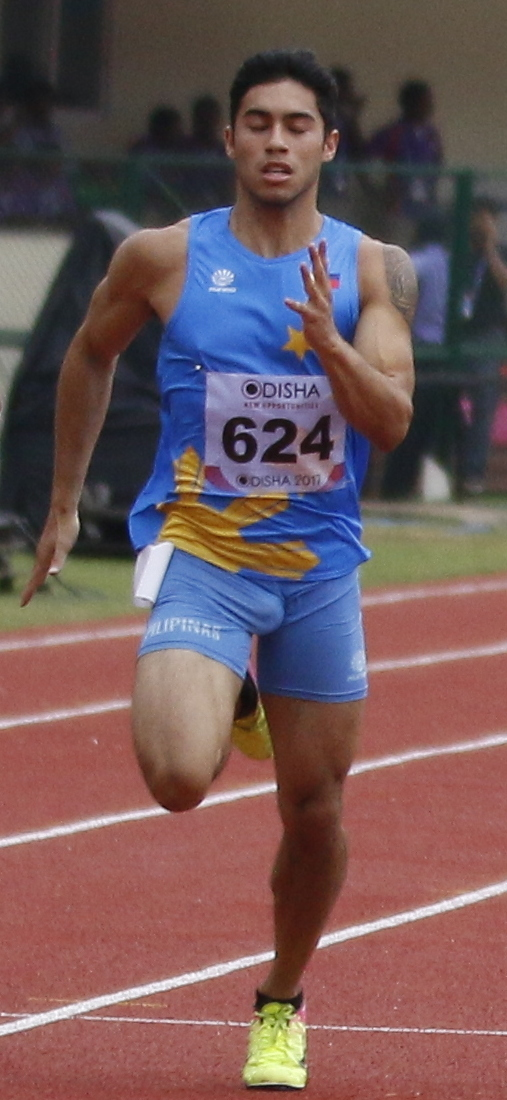
- Trenten Beram in 2017

Personal information
- Full name: Trenten Anthony Manugas Beram
- Nationality: Filipino/American
- Born: April 1, 1996 (age 30) Scarsdale, New York, United States

Sport
- Country: Philippines
- Sport: Track and field
- Events: 4 x 100 metres relay; 400 metres; 200 metres
Medal record
Southeast Asian Games
| Gold medal – first place | 2017 Kuala Lumpur | 400 m |
| Gold medal – first place | 2017 Kuala Lumpur | 200 m |
| Bronze medal – third place | 2017 Kuala Lumpur | 4 x 100 relay |

Trenten Anthony Manugas Beram (born April 1, 1996) is a retired Filipino American track and field athlete who competed in sprinting events.

== Early life ==
Trenten Beram was born April 1, 1996, in Scarsdale, a northern suburb of New York. He is the son of American Glen Beram and Nena Manugas who is from the Philippines. Trenten moved to Hopewell Junction, NY, where he attended Arlington High School in LaGrangeville.

Through the first 2 years of high school, Trenten played baseball earning a spot on the Varsity team because of his batting skills along with his speed in Centerfield. At the urging of his teammates, Trenten joined the indoor track team in his Junior year to help keep in shape for Baseball. Once there, his true abilities surfaced. Within one year, Trenten was able to beat numerous records at the amateur level as well as earn the status of All American at the National Junior Olympics.

In 2014 (his senior year of high school), Trenten was discovered by a talent scout in Manila and then contacted by the Philippine Amateur Track and Field Association (PATAFA), the national sports association for athletics in the Philippines. He was advised to join its athletics National Team, which would first require him to have dual citizenship. After months of reflection, Beram decided to run under the Philippine flag, driven by his interest on his mother's country. He began the process in November 2015, officially gaining Filipino citizenship seven months later. During this period, Trenten began his academic studies at the University of Connecticut as a math major. While actively contributing to the university's track success, he managed to hold a GPA close to 3.9, with nearly perfect scores.

== Athletics career ==
2016-2017: Two New National Records for the Philippines

Beram makes his entry into the Philippine National team in the 2016 season .

The Filipino athletics world reported on June 24, 2016, at PATAFA Trials, that the 200-meter Philippine 10 year record held by Ralph Waldy Soguilon (21.17), had been broken by Beram who ran it in 21.12 seconds.

In March, 2017, during the Ayala Philippine National Open, he was part of the 4 x 100 national team that marked a 40.29 seconds National record. Three months later, a time of 39.96 was achieved at the Hong Kong Invitational. The 4 × 100 made up of Beram, Lopena, Patrick Unso and Archand Bagsit further improved the Filipino National record in that event. On July 6, 2017, still a math student at UConn, Trent took part in the Asian Championships (Bhubaneswar, India) where he clocked a 200-meter time of 21.05 seconds, further improving on his National Record from the previous year. After advancing through the semifinals in 21.07 seconds, Beram placed fifth in the Finals, once again improving his national record in 20.96. He also became the first Filipino sprinter ever to fall under the 21 second mark in the 200 meter dash.

A month later he participated at the XXIX Southeast Asian Games in Kuala Lumpur, Malaysia. Here he won Gold in the 200 meter dash while setting yet another new National record of 20.84 seconds and beating out Arapong Meenapra (21.22) and Thevarr Gunasegaran (21.26 ) on August 23, 2017. A day later, Beram achieved a first in Filipino athletic history by also winning Gold in the 400 meter dash with a time of 46.39 seconds. He also captured bronze in the 4 × 100 relay with a time of 39.11, setting a new national record. The quartet was composed of Anfernee Lopena, Archand Bagsit, Eric Cray and Beram himself running anchor.

In 2019, Beram left the national team.
