= Yemen at the World Athletics Championships =

- WA code: YEM
- National federation: Yemen Athletics Federation
- Website: yemnoc.org/en/federations/t32.html
- Medals: Gold 0 Silver 0 Bronze 0 Total 0

World Athletics Championships appearances (overview)
- 1983; 1987; 1991; 1993; 1995; 1997; 1999; 2001; 2003; 2005; 2007; 2009; 2011; 2013; 2015; 2017; 2019; 2022; 2023; 2025

Yemen has competed at the World Athletics Championships on fourteen occasions, and did not send a delegation for the 1991 and 2017 editions. Its competing country code is YEM. The IAAF treats the past participation of the Yemen Arab Republic (YAR) and South Yemen (PDRY) as part of a united Yemen's history. The country has not won any medals at the competition and as of 2017 no Yemeni athlete has progressed beyond the first round of an event.

== Results ==
Key

- Note–Ranks given for track events are for the entire round
- Q = Qualified for the next round
- q = Qualified for the next round as a fastest loser or, in field events, by position without achieving the qualifying target
- NR = National record
- GR = Games record
- PB = Personal best
- SB = Season best
- DNF = Did not finish
- DNS = Did not start
- NM = No mark
- N/A = Round not applicable for the event
- Bye = Athlete not required to compete in round

=== 2011 ===
The Republic of Yemen competed at the 2011 World Championships in Athletics from August 27 to September 4 in Daegu, South Korea. A team of 2 athletes was announced to represent the country in the event.

==== Men ====
Athlete	Event	Preliminaries		Heats		Semifinals		Final	
Athlete	Event	Time Width Height	Rank	Time Width Height	Rank	Time Width Height	Rank	Time Width Height	Rank
Nabil Mohamed Al-Garbi	1500 metres			3:50.17 PB	32	Did not advance			

==== Women ====
Athlete	Event	Preliminaries		Heats		Semifinals		Final	
Athlete	Event	Time Width Height	Rank	Time Width Height	Rank	Time Width Height	Rank	Time Width Height	Rank
Fatima Abdullah Dahman	400 m hurdles			1:11.49 PB	38	Did not advance			

=== 2013 ===
Yemen competed at the 2013 World Championships in Athletics in Moscow, Russia, from 10–18 August 2013. A team of one athlete was announced to represent the country in the event.

=== 2019 ===
Yemen competed at the 2019 World Athletics Championships in Doha, Qatar, from 27 September–6 October 2019. Yemen had entered 1 athlete.

==== Men ====
Track and road events

Athlete	Event	Heat		Semifinal		Final	
Athlete	Event	Result	Rank	Result	Rank	Result	Rank
Ahmed Al-Yaari	200 m	22.37 NR	49	Did not advance			

=== 2023 ===
Yemen competed at the 2023 World Athletics Championships in Budapest, Hungary, which were held from 19 to 27 August 2023. The athlete delegation of the country was composed of one competitor, middle-distance runner Abdullah Al-Yaari who would compete in the men's 800 metres. He qualified upon being selected by the Yemen Amateur Athletic Federation but was a late entry. In the heats of the event against eight other competitors, he would place eighth though set a new personal best. He did not advance to the semifinals of the event.
