= Athletics at the 2015 Summer Universiade – Women's 20 kilometres walk =

The women's 20 kilometres walk event at the 2015 Summer Universiade was held on 10 July at the Gwangju Universiade Main Stadium.

== Medalists ==
=== Individual ===
Gold	Silver	Bronze
Anisya Kirdyapkina; Russia	Marina Pandakova; Russia	Hou Yongbo; China

=== Team ===
Gold	Silver	Bronze
Russia; Anisya Kirdyapkina; Marina Pandakova; Sofiya Brodatskaya; Lina Kalutskaya	China; Hou Yongbo; Yang Jiayu; Yang Mingxia; Liu Huan	Australia; Rachel Tallent; Stephanie Stigwood; Nicole Fagan

== Results ==
=== Individual ===
Rank	Name	Nationality	Time	Penalties	Notes
1st place, gold medalist(s)	Anisya Kirdyapkina	Russia	1:28:18		UR
2nd place, silver medalist(s)	Marina Pandakova	Russia	1:29:52		
3rd place, bronze medalist(s)	Hou Yongbo	China	1:32:42		
4	Sofiya Brodatskaya	Russia	1:35:00		
5	Yang Jiayu	China	1:36:50		PB
6	Inna Kashyna	Ukraine	1:37:23	>>	
7	Rachel Tallent	Australia	1:37:40		
8	Mária Czaková	Slovakia	1:38:24	>	
9	Yang Mingxia	China	1:38:25		
10	Daniela Stoffel	Portugal	1:38:27	>	
11	Federica Curiazzi	Italy	1:38:27	~>	
12	Lina Kalutskaya	Russia	1:41:04		
13	Olena Shumkina	Ukraine	1:41:28	>	
14	Stephanie Stigwood	Australia	1:42:05	~	
15	Sandra Nevarez	Mexico	1:42:28	>>	PB
16	Liu Huan	China	1:42:36	~	
17	Ching Siu Nga	Hong Kong	1:42:36	>	
18	Nicole Fagan	Australia	1:46:42		
19	Yenni Ortiz	Argentina	2:02:06	>	
20	Sofia Kloster	Argentina	2:03:58	>	
21	Sandy Karam	Lebanon	2:09:54	>>	NR
	Eleonora Bustos	Argentina	DQ	>>~	
	Vasylyna Vitovshchyk	Ukraine	DQ	>>>	
	Khushbir Kaur	India	DNS		

Penalties
~ Lost contact
> Bent knee

=== Team ===
Rank	Team	Time	Notes
1st place, gold medalist(s)	Russia	4:33:11	
2nd place, silver medalist(s)	China	4:47:58	
3rd place, bronze medalist(s)	Australia	5:06:28	
	Argentina		
	Ukraine		
