= 2019 Asian Athletics Championships – Men's 200 metres =

Men's 200 metres at the 2019 Asian Athletics Championships
- Venue: Khalifa International Stadium
- Location: Doha, Qatar
- Dates: 23 April (heats & semi-finals); 24 April (final)
- Competitors: 30 from 22 nations
- Winning time: 20.33

Medalists
gold medal	Xie Zhenye	China
silver medal	Yuki Koike	Japan
bronze medal	Yaqoob Eid Salem	Bahrain

The men's 200 metres event at the 2019 Asian Athletics Championships was held on 23 and 24 April 2019.

== Records ==
Records before the 2019 Asian Athletics Championships
Record	Athlete (nation)	Time (s)	Location	Date
World record	Usain Bolt (JAM)	19.19	Berlin, Germany	20 August 2009
Asian record	Femi Ogunode (QAT)	19.97	Brussel, Belgium	11 September 2015
Championship record	Femi Ogunode (QAT)	20.28	Wuhan, China	6 June 2015
World leading	Divine Oduduru (NGR)	19.76	Waco, United States	20 April 2019
Asian leading	Yoshihide Kiryu (JPN)	20.39	Brisbane, Australia	23 March 2019

== Results ==
=== Heats ===
Qualification rule: First 4 in each heat (Q) and the next 4 fastest (q) qualified for the semifinals.

Wind:
Heat 1: +1.3 m/s, Heat 2: +0.8 m/s, Heat 3: +2.7 m/s, Heat 4: +1.1 m/, Heat 5: +2.0 m/s

Rank	Heat	Name	Nationality	Time	Notes
1	1	Femi Seun Ogunode	Qatar	20.67	Q
2	4	Xie Zhenye	China	20.74	Q
3	3	Fahhad Mohammed Al Subaie	Saudi Arabia	20.88	Q
4	2	Ko Seung-hwan	South Korea	20.92	Q, PB
5	4	Noureddine Hadid	Lebanon	20.93	Q, NR
6	4	Abdo Barka	Bahrain	21.00	Q
7	2	Yaqoob Eid Salem	Bahrain	21.08	Q
8	1	Mohamed Obaid Al-Saadi	Oman	21.09	Q
9	5	Yuki Koike	Japan	21.18	Q
10	3	Liang Jinsheng	China	21.33	Q
11	4	Uzair Rehman	Pakistan	21.41	Q
12	5	Yeh Shou-po	Chinese Taipei	21.44	Q
13	3	Rashid Al-Aasmi	Oman	21.50	Q
14	1	Lee Jae-ha	South Korea	21.51	Q
15	4	Muhd Noor Firdaus Ar Rasyid	Brunei	21.54	q
16	5	Timothee Yap Jin Wei	Singapore	21.55	Q
17	5	Nutthapong Veeravongratanasiri	Thailand	21.55	Q
18	2	Russel Alexander Nasir Taib	Malaysia	21.77	Q
19	3	Alisher Sadulayev	Turkmenistan	21.79	Q
20	4	Joko Kuncoro Adi	Indonesia	21.80	q, PB
21	1	Mahmoud El Daou	Lebanon	21.87	Q
22	3	Jaber Hilal Al-Mamari	Qatar	21.96	q
23	1	Eric Shauwn Cray	Philippines	21.98	q
24	2	Tan Zongyang	Singapore	22.16	Q
25	1	Aligadzhi Magamedgadzhiev	Kyrgyzstan	22.21	SB
26	2	Pen Sokong	Cambodia	22.33	
27	3	Ahmed Al-Yaari	Yemen	22.34	
28	5	Ibrahim Ashfan Ali	Maldives	22.57	
29	3	Ibadulla Adam	Maldives	22.87	
	2	Yousef Karam	Kuwait	DQ	R162.8
	2	Hussein Ali Al-Khafaji	Iraq	DNS	
	5	Mohammed Abdulridha Al-Tameemi	Iraq	DNS	
	5	Saeed Bahashwan	Yemen	DNS	
	1	Chayut Khongprasit	Thailand	DNS	
	4	Tosin Ogunode	Qatar	DNS	
	5	Hassan Taftian	Iran	DNS	
	3	Himasha Eashan Waththakankanamge	Sri Lanka	DNS	

=== Semi-finals ===
Qualification rule: First 2 in each heat (Q) and the next 2 fastest (q) qualified for the final.

Wind:
Heat 1: +1.3 m/s, Heat 2: +0.7 m/s, Heat 3: +1.3 m/s

Rank	Heat	Name	Nationality	Time	Notes
1	1	Xie Zhenye	China	20.35	Q
2	1	Yuki Koike	Japan	20.60	Q
3	3	Femi Seun Ogunode	Qatar	20.63	Q
4	3	Yaqoob Eid Salem	Bahrain	20.71	Q
5	2	Fahhad Mohammed Al Subaie	Saudi Arabia	20.76	Q, SB
6	2	Ko Seung-hwan	South Korea	20.81	Q, PB
7	1	Mohamed Obaid Al-Saadi	Oman	20.86	q
8	3	Noureddine Hadid	Lebanon	21.04	q
9	3	Lee Jae-ha	South Korea	21.18	
10	2	Yeh Shou-po	Chinese Taipei	21.33	
11	2	Uzair Rehman	Pakistan	21.48	
12	1	Nutthapong Veeravongratanasiri	Thailand	21.49	
13	2	Muhd Noor Firdaus Ar Rasyid	Brunei	21.62	
14	3	Rashid Al-Aasmi	Oman	21.74	PB
15	2	Russel Alexander Nasir Taib	Malaysia	21.75	
16	3	Alisher Sadulayev	Turkmenistan	21.88	
17	1	Jaber Hilal Al-Mamari	Qatar	21.90	
18	2	Joko Kuncoro Adi	Indonesia	22.08	
19	3	Tan Zongyang	Singapore	22.18	
20	1	Timothee Yap Jin Wei	Singapore	23.04	
21	1	Mahmoud El Daou	Lebanon	36.10	
	1	Abdo Barka	Bahrain	DNF	
	3	Eric Shauwn Cray	Philippines	DQ	R162.8
	2	Liang Jinsheng	China	DQ	R163.3a

=== Final ===
Wind: +1.7 m/s

Rank	Lane	Name	Nationality	Time	Notes
1st place, gold medalist(s)	7	Xie Zhenye	China	20.33	
2nd place, silver medalist(s)	6	Yuki Koike	Japan	20.55	
3rd place, bronze medalist(s)	9	Yaqoob Eid Salem	Bahrain	20.84	
4	2	Noureddine Hadid	Lebanon	20.85	NR
5	8	Ko Seung-hwan	South Korea	20.94	
	4	Femi Seun Ogunode	Qatar	DNF	
	3	Mohamed Obaid Al-Saadi	Oman	DNS	
	4	Fahhad Mohammed Al Subaie	Saudi Arabia	DNS	
