= Rud (disambiguation) =

Rud is a Persian stringed musical instrument.

Rud or RUD may also refer to:

== Geography ==
- Khvaf, also called Rūd, a city in Iran
- Rud, Nishapur, a village in Iran

== People ==
- Anne Rud (died 1533), Danish noble and landholder
- Jon Raahauge Rud (born 1986), Danish swimmer
- Ove Rud (1923–2007), Danish actor
- Otte Rud (1520–1565), Danish admiral
- Rutherford "Rud" Rennie (1897–1956), American newspaperman and sportswriter
- Rued Langgaard (1893–1952), Danish composer, born Rud Immanuel Langgaard.

== Religion ==
- Ram and Rud, progenitors of the second generation of humans in Mandaeism

== Transportation ==
- IATA code for Shahroud Airport
- Rutland station, Vermont, Amtrak rail code
- Rapid Unscheduled Disassembly (explosion)

== See also ==
- , a common element in Iranian place names
