= Yemen at the 2023 World Athletics Championships =

- Flag of Yemen
- WA code: YEM

in Budapest, Hungary 19 August 2023 – 27 August 2023
- Competitors: 1 (1 man and 0 women)
- Medals: Gold 0 Silver 0 Bronze 0 Total 0

World Athletics Championships appearances (overview)
- 1983; 1987; 1991; 1993; 1995; 1997; 1999; 2001; 2003; 2005; 2007; 2009; 2011; 2013; 2015; 2017; 2019; 2022; 2023

Yemen competed at the 2023 World Athletics Championships in Budapest, Hungary, which were held from 19 to 27 August 2023. The athlete delegation of the country was composed of one competitor, middle-distance runner Abdullah Al-Yaari who would compete in the men's 800 metres. He qualified upon being selected by the Yemen Amateur Athletic Federation but was a late entry. In the heats of the event against eight other competitors, he would place eighth though set a new personal best. He did not advance to the semifinals of the event.

== Background ==
The 2023 World Athletics Championships in Budapest, Hungary, were held from 19 to 27 August 2023. The Championships were held at the National Athletics Centre. To qualify for the World Championships, athletes had to reach an entry standard (e.g. time or distance), place in a specific position at select competitions, be a wild card entry, or qualify through their World Athletics Ranking at the end of the qualification period.

As Yemen did not meet any of the four standards, they could send either one male or one female athlete in one event of the Championships who has not yet qualified. The Yemen Amateur Athletic Federation selected middle-distance runner Abdullah Al-Yaari who was a late entry as he was not entered in the Entry List as of 10 August, around a week before the World Championships.

== Results ==
Key

- Q = Qualified for the next round
- q = Qualified for the next round as a fastest loser or, in field events, by position without achieving the qualifying target
- NR = National record
- PB = Personal best
- SB = Season best
- N/A = Round not applicable for the event

=== Men ===
Al-Yaari competed in the heats of the men's 800 metres on 22 August against eight other competitors in his round. He raced in the last heat, the seventh heat, and recorded a time of 1:47.98. His time would set a new personal best but would place him eighth in the round and thus did not advance further to the semifinals.

==== Track and road events ====
Athlete	Event	Heat		Semifinal		Final	
Athlete	Event	Result	Rank	Result	Rank	Result	Rank
Abdullah Al-Yaari	800 metres	1:47.98 PB	8	Did not advance			
