= 2019 World Athletics Championships – Men's 200 metres =

Men's 200 metres at the 2019 World Championships
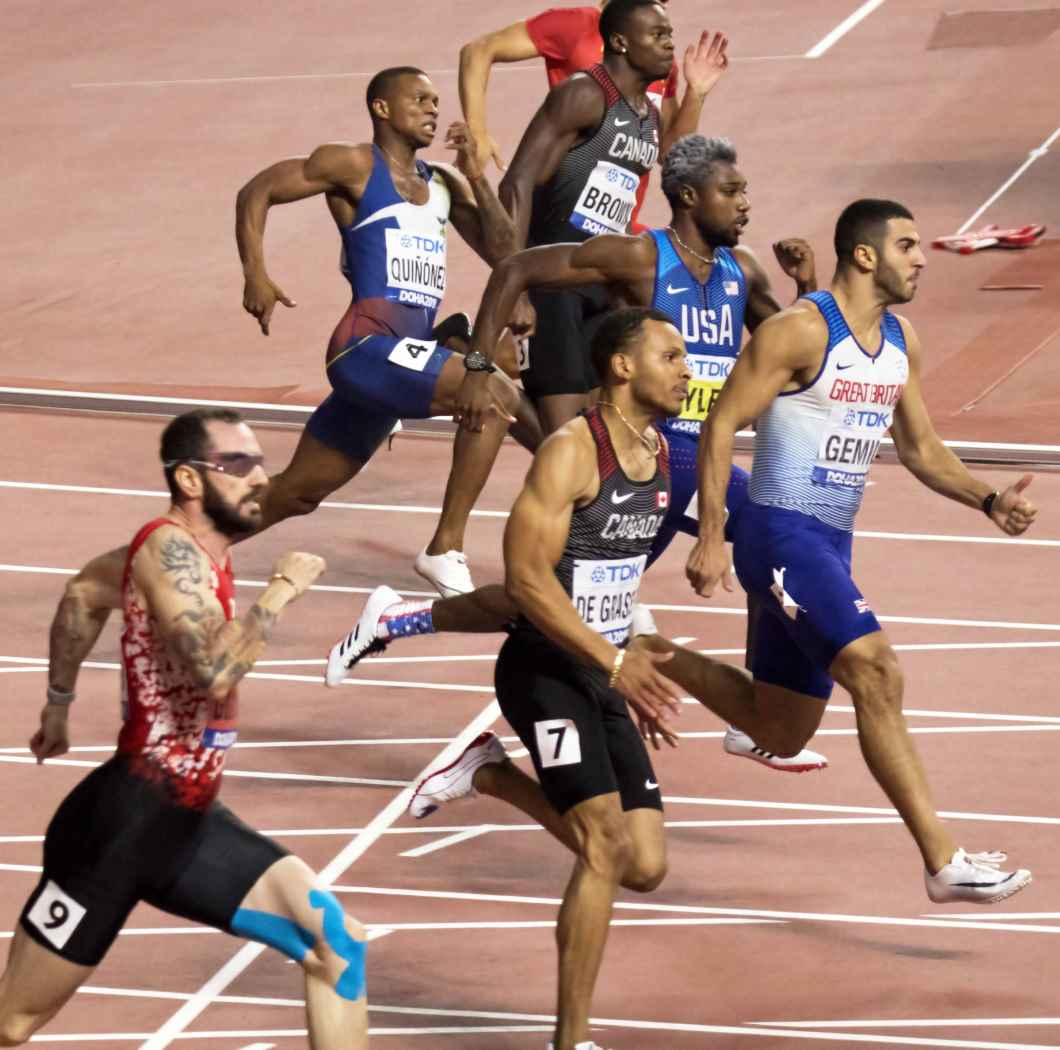
- 200m men final
- Venue: Khalifa International Stadium
- Dates: 29 September (heats); 30 September (semi-finals); 1 October (final)
- Competitors: 52 from 37 nations
- Winning time: 19.83

Medalists
gold medal	Noah Lyles	United States
silver medal	Andre De Grasse	Canada
bronze medal	Álex Quiñónez	Ecuador

Video on YouTube Official Video

The men's 200 metres at the 2019 World Athletics Championships was held at the Khalifa International Stadium in Doha from 29 September to 1 October 2019. The winning margin was 0.12 seconds.

== Summary ==
Out of the blocks in the final, Adam Gemili took a slight lead through the turn with Andre De Grasse then Noah Lyles giving up as much as a meter. Coming off the turn, Lyles accelerated past Gemili. Once Lyles hit his top end speed, there was no catching him. Behind him, Álex Quiñónez was gaining on De Grasse and both were edging closer to Gemili. 20 metres out, both went by. Lyles won by 2 metres, De Grasse held off Quiñónez for silver.

Lyles' victory capped an evening of 3 men's gold medals for USA also including Sam Kendricks in the pole vault and Donavan Brazier in the 800 metres.

== Records ==
Before the competition records were as follows:

Record	Athlete	Perf.	Location	Date
World	Usain Bolt (JAM)	19.19	Berlin, Germany	20 August 2009
Championship	Usain Bolt (JAM)	19.19	Berlin, Germany	20 August 2009
World Leading	Noah Lyles (USA)	19.50	Lausanne, Switzerland	5 July 2019
African	Frank Fredericks (NAM)	19.68	Atlanta, United States	1 August 1996
Asian	Xie Zhenye (CHN)	19.88	London, Great Britain	21 July 2019
North, Central American and Caribbean	Usain Bolt (JAM)	19.19	Berlin, Germany	20 August 2009
South American	Alonso Edward (PAN)	19.81	Berlin, Germany	20 August 2009
European	Pietro Mennea (ITA)	19.72A	Mexico City, Mexico	12 September 1979
Oceanian	Peter Norman (AUS)	20.06A	Mexico City, Mexico	16 October 1968

The following records were set at the competition:

Record	Perf.	Athlete	Nat.	Date
Lebanese	20.84	Noureddine Hadid	LIB	29 Sep 2019
Yemeni	22.37	Ahmed Al-Yaari	YEM	29 Sep 2019

== Qualification standard ==
The standard to qualify automatically for entry was 20.40.

== Schedule ==
The event schedule, in local time (UTC+3), was as follows:

Date	Time	Round
29 September	20:05	Heats
30 September	20:50	Semi-finals
1 October	22:40	Final

== Results ==
=== Heats ===
The first three in each heat (Q) and the next three fastest (q) qualified for the semifinals.

Wind:
Heat 1: +0.5 m/s, Heat 2: +0.5 m/s, Heat 3: +0.8 m/s, Heat 4: +0.7 m/s, Heat 5: +1.0 m/s, Heat 6: +0.9 m/s, Heat 7: +0.2 m/s

Rank	Heat	Lane	Name	Nationality	Time	Notes
1	1	7	Adam Gemili	Great Britain & N.I.	20.06	Q, SB
2	3	4	Álex Quiñónez	Ecuador	20.08	Q
3	5	4	Aaron Brown	Canada	20.10	Q
4	5	5	Miguel Francis	Great Britain & N.I.	20.11	Q
5	4	6	Kyle Greaux	Trinidad and Tobago	20.19	Q
6	2	4	Xie Zhenye	China	20.20	Q
7	6	7	Andre De Grasse	Canada	20.20	Q
8	7	8	Jereem Richards	Trinidad and Tobago	20.23	Q
8	3	8	Yohan Blake	Jamaica	20.23	Q, SB
10	2	3	Zharnel Hughes	Great Britain & N.I.	20.24	Q, SB
11	7	3	Noah Lyles	United States	20.26	Q
12	1	2	Ramil Guliyev	Turkey	20.27	Q
13	6	9	Clarence Munyai	South Africa	20.29	Q
14	2	5	Anaso Jobodwana	South Africa	20.35	Q, SB
15	5	6	Rasheed Dwyer	Jamaica	20.37	Q
16	1	6	Taymir Burnet	Netherlands	20.37	Q
17	7	2	Brendon Rodney	Canada	20.38	Q
18	6	6	Serhiy Smelyk	Ukraine	20.39	Q
19	1	9	Divine Oduduru	Nigeria	20.40	q
20	3	6	Alex Wilson	Switzerland	20.40	Q
21	7	7	Andre Ewers	Jamaica	20.41	q
22	5	3	Fausto Desalu	Italy	20.43	q
23	3	7	Aldemir da Silva Júnior	Brazil	20.44	
24	2	8	Yuki Koike	Japan	20.46	
25	4	2	Yancarlos Martínez	Dominican Republic	20.47	Q
26	2	7	Fahhad Al-Subaie	Saudi Arabia	20.51	
27	4	4	Reynier Mena	Cuba	20.52	Q
28	6	3	Sydney Siame	Zambia	20.58	
29	4	7	Jeremy Dodson	Samoa	20.60	
30	6	4	Kirara Shiraishi	Japan	20.62	
31	5	8	Jun Yamashita	Japan	20.62	
32	7	6	Mouhamadou Fall	France	20.63	
33	4	3	Bernardo Baloyes	Colombia	20.64	
34	6	8	Steven Müller	Germany	20.69	
35	7	4	Guy Maganga Gorra	Gabon	20.74	
36	1	5	Paulo André de Oliveira	Brazil	20.75	
37	5	7	Abdelaziz Mohamed	Qatar	20.75	SB
38	3	2	Yang Chun-han	Chinese Taipei	20.80	
39	3	5	Noureddine Hadid	Lebanon	20.84	NR
40	6	5	Sibusiso Matsenjwa	Eswatini	20.85	
41	4	8	Emmanuel Eseme	Cameroon	20.87	
42	3	9	Antonio Infantino	Italy	20.89	
43	1	8	Rodney Rowe	United States	20.92	
44	5	9	Emmanuel Arowolo	Nigeria	21.07	
45	1	3	Fodé Sissoko	Mali	21.30	
46	4	5	Kenneth Bednarek	United States	21.50	
47	2	6	José Andrés Salazar	El Salvador	21.64	
48	2	9	Muhd Noor Firdaus Ar-Rasyid	Brunei	21.99	
49	6	2	Ahmed Al-Yaari	Yemen	22.37	NR
50	3	3	Grégory Bradai	French Polynesia	22.79	SB
	1	4	Terrance Jones	Bahamas	DQ	163.3(a)
	5	2	Jeffrey Vanan	Suriname	DQ	163.3(a)
	7	5	Alonso Edward	Panama	DNS	

=== Semi-finals ===
Video on YouTube Official Video

The first 2 in each heat (Q) and the next two fastest (q) qualified for the final.

Wind:
Heat 1: -0.3 m/s, Heat 2: +0.1 m/s, Heat 3: -0.1 m/s

Rank	Heat	Lane	Name	Nationality	Time	Notes
1	2	5	Noah Lyles	United States	19.86	Q
2	2	4	Álex Quiñónez	Ecuador	19.95	Q
3	2	6	Xie Zhenye	China	20.03	q
4	1	5	Adam Gemili	Great Britain & N.I.	20.03	Q, SB
5	3	6	Andre De Grasse	Canada	20.08	Q
6	1	4	Ramil Guliyev	Turkey	20.16	Q
7	1	6	Aaron Brown	Canada	20.20	q
8	3	7	Kyle Greaux	Trinidad and Tobago	20.24	Q
9	2	8	Yancarlos Martínez	Dominican Republic	20.28	SB
10	1	7	Jereem Richards	Trinidad and Tobago	20.28	
11	3	5	Zharnel Hughes	Great Britain & N.I.	20.30	
12	3	8	Taymir Burnet	Netherlands	20.34	PB
13	2	9	Brendon Rodney	Canada	20.34	
14	3	9	Anaso Jobodwana	South Africa	20.34	SB
15	3	4	Yohan Blake	Jamaica	20.37	
16	1	8	Rasheed Dwyer	Jamaica	20.54	
17	1	9	Clarence Munyai	South Africa	20.55	
18	1	2	Serhiy Smelyk	Ukraine	20.55	
19	2	3	Andre Ewers	Jamaica	20.61	
20	3	3	Reynier Mena	Cuba	20.61	
21	2	2	Fausto Desalu	Italy	20.73	
22	3	2	Divine Oduduru	Nigeria	20.84	
	1	3	Alex Wilson	Switzerland	DNS	
	2	7	Miguel Francis	Great Britain & N.I.	DNS	

=== Final ===
The final was started on 1 October at 22:40.

Wind: +0.3 m/s

Rank	Lane	Name	Nationality	Time	Notes
1st place, gold medalist(s)	5	Noah Lyles	United States	19.83	
2nd place, silver medalist(s)	7	Andre De Grasse	Canada	19.95	
3rd place, bronze medalist(s)	4	Álex Quiñónez	Ecuador	19.98	
4	6	Adam Gemili	Great Britain & N.I.	20.03	SB
5	9	Ramil Guliyev	Turkey	20.07	
6	3	Aaron Brown	Canada	20.10	
7	2	Xie Zhenye	China	20.14	
8	8	Kyle Greaux	Trinidad and Tobago	20.39	
