= Anisya Kirdyapkina =

Russian racewalker

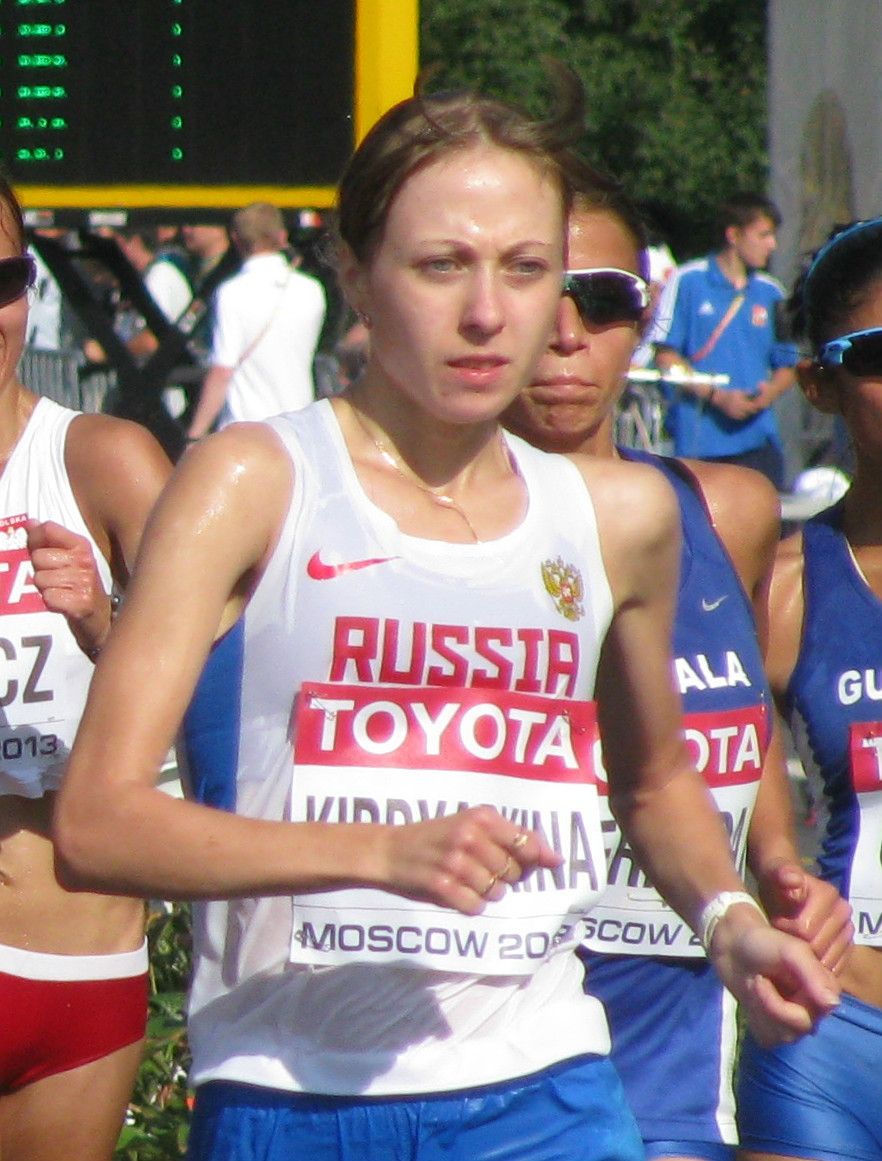

Personal information
- Born: Anisya Byasyrovna Kornikova; 23 October 1989 (age 36) Saransk, Mordovia
- Height: 1.64 m (5 ft 4 1/2 in)
- Weight: 47 kg (104 lb)

Sport
- Country: Russia
- Sport: Women's athletics
- Event: 20km Race Walk
Medal record
World Championships
| Bronze medal – third place | 2009 Berlin | 20 km walk |
| Disqualified | 2013 Moscow | 20 km walk |
| Disqualified | 2011 Daegu | 20 km walk |
European Championships
| Gold medal – first place | 2010 Barcelona | 20 km walk |
European Cup
| Gold medal – first place | 2009 Metz | Team 20 km walk |
Universiade
| Disqualified | 2013 Kazan | 20 km walk |
| Disqualified | 2013 Kazan | Team 20 km walk |

Anisya Byasyrovna Kirdyapkina (Russian: Анися Бясыровна Кирдяпкина; née Kornikova Russian: Корникова; born 23 October 1989) is a Russian race walker. She is married to Sergey Kirdyapkin, who is also a racewalker. She was discovered by the race walking coach Konstantin Nacharkin at the age of nine. She met her future husband through race walking and they were married when she was 18. As of 2014, they shared a coach, Viktor Chegin.

== Career ==
In 2007, she won the Russian Winter Championships, the European Race Walking Cup and the European Junior Championships, all 10 km races. She race in the 20 km IAAF Race Walking Challenge Final, which was held in her hometown of Saransk. She finished second to Olga Kaniskina. She received two technique disqualifications in races in 2008. In 2009, she finished in 4th at the World Championships which was retrospectively upgraded to bronze due to the disqualification of the original gold medalist, 5 days before her husband won gold. In 2010, she won the summer and winter Russian titles, setting a new personal best of 1.25.11. That year, she finished second in a Russian one, two, three at the European Championships. At the 2011 she won a bronze medal at the World Championships.

Kirdyapkina's qualification for the 2012 Olympics came down to a battle between her and Tatyana Sibileva. Kirdyapkina qualified for the 2012 Olympics by beating Sibileva at the Russian National Championships. At the 2012 Olympics, she finished in 5th place.

At the 2013 Universiade, held in Kazan, Russia, Kirdyapkina lead a Russian one, two, three with a championship record of 1:29:30. She finished in second in the 2013 World Championships in Moscow beaten by Russian teammate Elena Lashmanova.

In February 2019, Kirdyapkina was banned for three years for doping and all her results from 25 February 2011 to 11 October were disqualified including her 2 Universiade gold medals, 2 World Championship silver medals and her 2012 Olympics 5th place.

== International competitions ==
Representing Russia
| Year | Competition | Venue | Position | Event | Result | Notes |
|---|---|---|---|---|---|---|
| 2007 | European Race Walking Cup | Leamington Spa, United Kingdom | 1st | 10 km walk | 43:17 | |
| 2007 | European Race Walking Cup | Leamington Spa, United Kingdom | 2nd | Junior team | 18 pts | |
| 2007 | European Junior Championships | Hengelo, Netherlands | 1st | 10,000 m walk | 43:27.20 | |
| 2008 | World Race Walking Cup | Cheboksary, Russia | — | 20 km walk | DQ | Lifting |
| 2009 | European Race Walking Cup | Metz, France | 2nd | 20 km walk | 1:33:28 | |
| 2009 | European Race Walking Cup | Metz, France | 1st | Team | 14 pts | |
| 2009 | World Championships | Berlin, Germany | 3rd | 20 km walk | 1:30:09 | |
| 2010 | World Race Walking Cup | Chihuahua, Mexico | 6th | 20 km walk | 1:34:47 | |
| 2010 | European Championships | Barcelona, Spain | 1st | 20 km walk | 1:28:55 | |
| 2011 | European Race Walking Cup | Olhão, Portugal | DQ (2nd) | 20 km walk | 1:30:41 | Doping |
| 2011 | European Race Walking Cup | Olhão, Portugal | DQ (1st) | Team | 14 pts | Doping |
| 2011 | World Championships | Daegu, South Korea | DQ (3rd) | 20 km walk | 1:30:12 | Doping |
| 2012 | World Race Walking Cup | Saransk, Russia | DQ (6th) | 20 km walk | 1:31:00 | Doping |
| 2012 | Olympic Games | London, United Kingdom | DQ (5th) | 20 km walk | 1:26:26 | Doping |
| 2013 | European Race Walking Cup | Dudince, Slovakia | DQ (1st) | 20 km walk | 1:28:39 | Doping |
| 2013 | European Race Walking Cup | Dudince, Slovakia | DQ (1st) | Team | 6 pts | Doping |
| 2013 | Universiade | Kazan, Russia | DQ (1st) | 20 km walk | 1:29:30 | Doping |
| 2013 | Universiade | Kazan, Russia | DQ (1st) | Team | 4:32:41 | Doping |
| 2013 | World Championships | Moscow, Russia | DQ (2nd) | 20 km walk | 1:27:11 | Doping |
| 2014 | World Race Walking Cup | Taicang, China | 1st | 20 km walk | 1:26:31 | |
| 2015 | Universiade | Gwangju, South Korea | 1st | 20 km walk | 1:28:18 | |
| 2015 | Universiade | Gwangju, South Korea | 1st | Team | 4:33:11 | |
