= Federica Curiazzi =

Italian racewalker (born 1992)

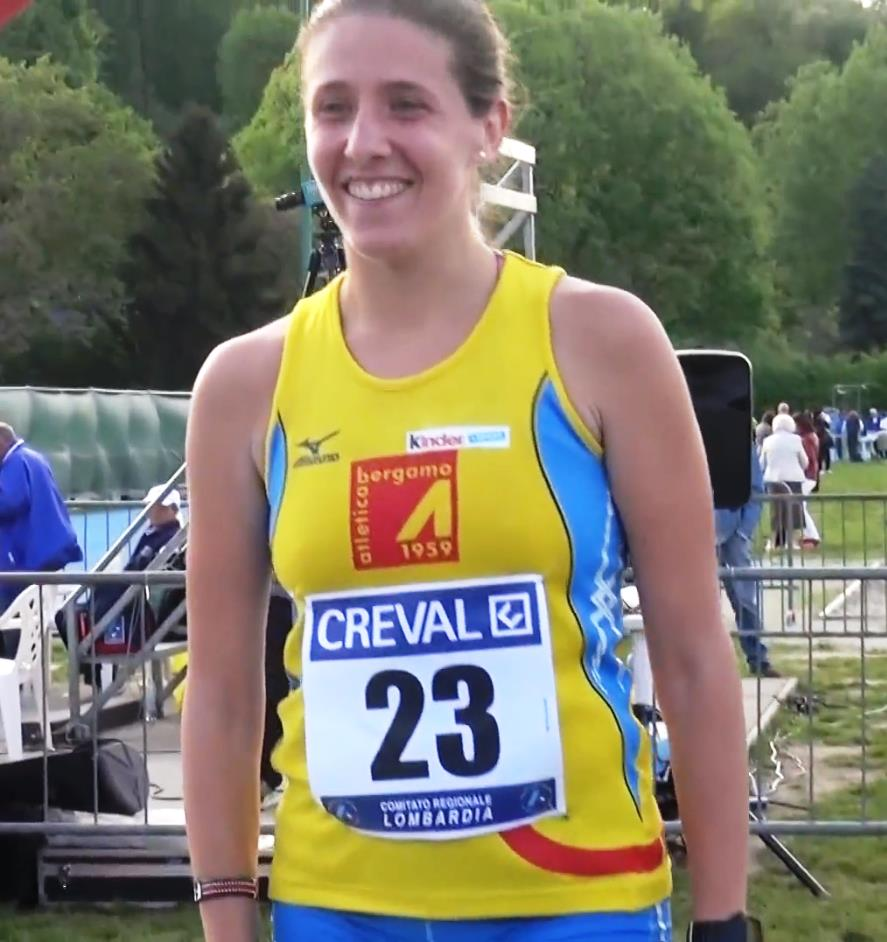
- Curiazzi in 2015.

Personal information
- National team: Italy: 5 caps (until 2020)
- Born: 14 August 1992 (age 33) Bergamo, Italy

Sport
- Sport: Athletics
- Event: Race walking
- Club: Atletica Bergamo 1959
- Coached by: Ruggero Sala

Achievements and titles
- Personal bests: 10 km: 45:50 (2020); 20 km: 1:35:32 (2015); 35 km: 3:10:09 (2020); 50 km: 4:30:17 (2019)
Medal record
Representing Italy
Women's athletics
World Team Championships
Silver medal – second place	2026 Brasília	Marathon walk (team)
European Race Walking Cup
Bronze medal – third place	2019 Alytus	Team

Federica Curiazzi (born 14 August 1992) is an Italian racewalker.

== Achievements ==
Senior

Year	Competition	Venue	Rank	Event	Performance	Notes
2014	World Race Walking Cup	(China) Taicang	57th	20 km walk	1:35:59	PB
2014	World Race Walking Cup	(China) Taicang	5th	Team	70 pts	
2014	European Championships	(Switzerland) Zürich	22nd	20 km walk	1:35:48	PB
2015	Universiade	(China) Gwangju	11th	20 km walk	1:36:27	
2019	European Race Walking Cup	(Lithuania) Alytus	15th	50 km walk	4:30:17	PB
2019	European Race Walking Cup	(Lithuania) Alytus	3rd	Team	27 pts	

== See also ==
- Italian all-time lists – 50 km walk
- Italian team at the running events
