= Yuki Koike =

Japanese sprinter (born 1995)

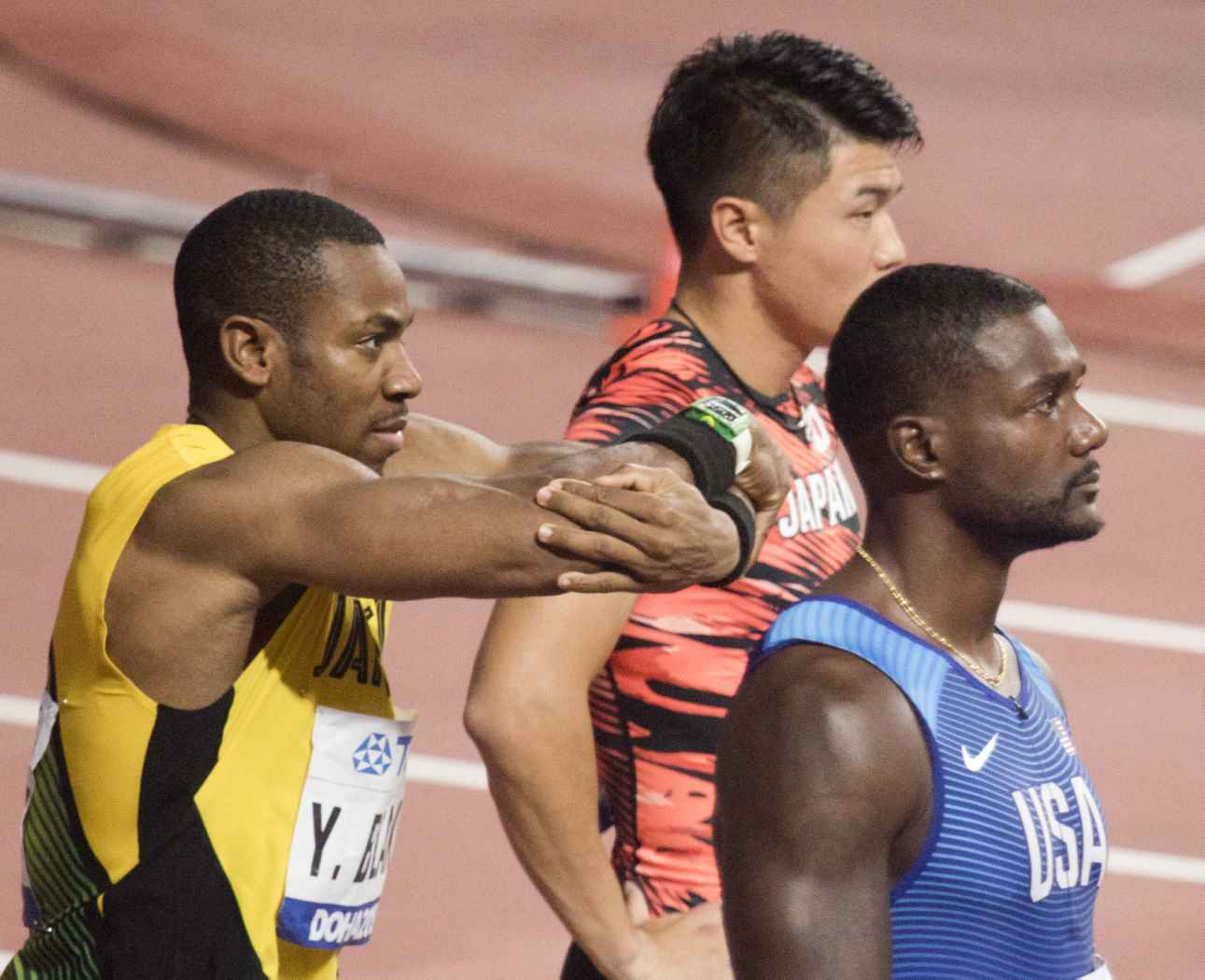

Personal information
- Nationality: Japanese
- Born: 13 May 1995 (age 31) Otaru, Japan
- Education: Keio University
- Height: 1.73 m (5 ft 8 in)
- Weight: 73 kg (161 lb)

Sport
- Sport: Athletics
- Event: Sprinting
- Coached by: Junichi Usui
Medal record
Men's athletics
Representing Japan
World Championships
Bronze medal – third place	2019 Doha	4×100 m relay
Asian Games
Gold medal – first place	2018 Jakarta	200 m
Bronze medal – third place	2018 Jakarta	4×400 m relay
Asian Championships
Silver medal – second place	2019 Doha	200 m

Yuki Koike (小池 祐貴, Koike Yūki; born 13 May 1995) is a Japanese sprinter. He won a gold medal in the 200 metres at the 2018 Asian Games.

== International competitions ==
Year	Competition	Venue	Position	Event	Notes
Representing Japan
2014	World Junior Championships	Eugene, United States	4th	200 m	20.34
2014	World Junior Championships	Eugene, United States	2nd	4 × 100 m relay	39.02
2015	Asian Championships	Wuhan, China	13th (h)	100 m	10.70^{1}
2015	Universiade	Gwangju, South Korea	10th (sf)	100 m	10.35
2015	Universiade	Gwangju, South Korea	1st (h)	4 × 100 m relay	38.93
2018	Asian Games	Jakarta, Indonesia	1st	200 m	20.23
2018	Asian Games	Jakarta, Indonesia	3rd	4 × 400 m relay	3:01.94
2019	Asian Championships	Doha, Qatar	2nd	200 m	20.55
2019	World Relays	Yokohama, Japan	–	4 × 100 m relay	DQ
2019	World Championships	Doha, Qatar	22nd (sf)	100 m	10.28
2019	World Championships	Doha, Qatar	24th (h)	200 m	20.46
2019	World Championships	Doha, Qatar	3rd (h)	4 × 100 m relay	37.78
2021	Olympic Games	Tokyo, Japan	32nd (h)	100 m	10.22
2021	Olympic Games	Tokyo, Japan	9th (h)	4 × 100 m relay	38.16^{2}
2023	World Championships	Budapest, Hungary	5th	4 × 100 m relay	37.83
2023	Asian Games	Hangzhou, China	10th (sf)	100 m	10.22
2023	Asian Games	Hangzhou, China	2nd	4 × 100 m relay	38.44
2025	World Championships	Tokyo, Japan	6th	4 × 100 m relay	38.35

^{1}Did not start in the semi-finals
^{2}Did not finish in the final

== Personal bests ==
Outdoors

- 100 metres – 9.98 (+0.5 m/s, London 2019)
- 200 metres – 20.23 (+0.7 m/s, Jakarta 2018)
- 400 metres – 46.87 (Fukuroi 2015)
