= Trinidad and Tobago at the 2019 World Athletics Championships =

Trinidad and Tobago at the 2019 World Championships in Athletics
- Flag of Trinidad and Tobago
- WA code: TTO
- National federation: National Association of Athletics Administrations of Trinidad & Tobago
- Website: ttnaaa.org

in Doha, Qatar
- Competitors: 14
- Medals: Gold 0 Silver 0 Bronze 0 Total 0

World Championships in Athletics appearances
- 1983; 1987; 1991; 1993; 1995; 1997; 1999; 2001; 2003; 2005; 2007; 2009; 2011; 2013; 2015; 2017; 2019; 2022; 2023

Trinidad and Tobago competed at the 2019 World Championships in Athletics in Doha, Qatar, from 27 September to 6 October 2019.

== Results ==
Key

- Q = Qualified for the next round
- q = Qualified for the next round as a fastest loser or, in field events, by position without achieving the qualifying target
- NR = National record
- PB = Personal best
- SB = Season best
- N/A = Round not applicable for the event

=== Men ===
Track and road events

Athlete	Event	Heat		Semi-final		Final	
Athlete	Event	Result	Rank	Result	Rank	Result	Rank
Kyle Greaux	200 metres	20.19	5	20.24	8	20.39	8
Jereem Richards	200 metres	20.23	8	20.28	10	Did not advance	
Machel Cedenio	400 metres	45.26	9	44.41	5	45.30	7
Asa Guevara; Jereem Richards; Darren Alfred; Deon Lendore; Machel Cedenio	4 × 400 metres relay	3:01.35	5	-		3:00.74 SB	5

Field events

Athlete	Event	Qualification		Final	
Athlete	Event	Distance	Position	Distance	Position
Andwuelle Wright	Long jump	7.76	17	Did not advance	
Keshorn Walcott	Javelin throw	84.44	5	77.47	11

=== Women ===
Track and road events

Athlete	Event	Heat		Semi-final		Final	
Athlete	Event	Result	Rank	Result	Rank	Result	Rank
Kelly-Ann Baptiste	100 metres	11.21	14	11.19	12	Did not advance	
Kamaria Durant	200 metres	23.08	21	23.44	22	Did not advance	
Mauricia Prieto	200 metres	23.33	31	Did not advance			
Semoy Hackett; Kelly-Ann Baptiste; Reyare Thomas; Kamaria Durant; Mauricia Prieto	4 × 100 metres relay	42.75 SB	5	-		42.71 SB	6

Field events

Athlete	Event	Qualification		Final	
Athlete	Event	Distance	Position	Distance	Position
Portious Warren	Shot put	17.46	19	Did not advance	
