= Athletics at the 2013 Summer Universiade – Women's 20 kilometres walk =

The women's 20 km race walk at the 2013 Summer Universiade was held on July 10, 2013.

== Medalists ==
=== Individual ===
Gold	Silver	Bronze
Irina Yumanova; Russia	Lina Bikulova; Russia	Hanna Drabenia; Belarus

=== Team ===
Gold	Silver	Bronze
Russia; Anisya Kirdyapkina; Irina Yumanova; Lina Bikulova; Vera Sokolova	China; Yang Mingxia; Zhang Xin; Gao Ni; Zhou Tongmei	

== Results ==
Rank	Name	Nationality	Time	Notes
DQ	~~Anisya Kirdyapkina~~	Russia	DQ	UR
1st place, gold medalist(s)	Irina Yumanova	Russia	1:30:41	
2nd place, silver medalist(s)	Lina Bikulova	Russia	1:32:30	
3rd place, bronze medalist(s)	Hanna Drabenia	Belarus	1:33:15	
4	Yang Mingxia	China	1:33:22	
5	Laura Reynolds	Ireland	1:33:31	SB
6	Paola Pérez	Ecuador	1:33:40	
7	Aiman Kozhakmetova	Kazakhstan	1:36:37	
8	Lucie Pelantová	Czech Republic	1:37:03	
9	Mária Czaková	Slovakia	1:37:20	
10	Zhang Xin	China	1:38:16	
11	Gao Ni	China	1:38:16	
12	Hiroi Maeda	Japan	1:38:48	
13	Sui Nga Ching	Hong Kong	1:40:52	PB
14	Zhou Tongmei	China	1:44:44	
15	Stephanie Stigwood	Australia	1:45:05	
16	Chia-Feng Chang	Chinese Taipei	1:47:36	
	Rachel Tallent	Australia	DNF	
	Despoina Zapounidou	Greece	DNF	
	Lizbet Silva Miranda	Mexico	DQ	
	Vera Sokolova	Russia	DQ	
	Olga Skrypak	Ukraine	DNS	
