= State Secretariat for International Finance =

Swiss administrative unit

- (in German) Staatssekretariat für internationale Finanzfragen (in French) Secrétariat d'État aux questions financières internationales (in Italian) Segreteria di Stato per le questioni finanziarie internazionali (in Romansh) Secretariat da stadi per dumondas finanzialas internaziunalas

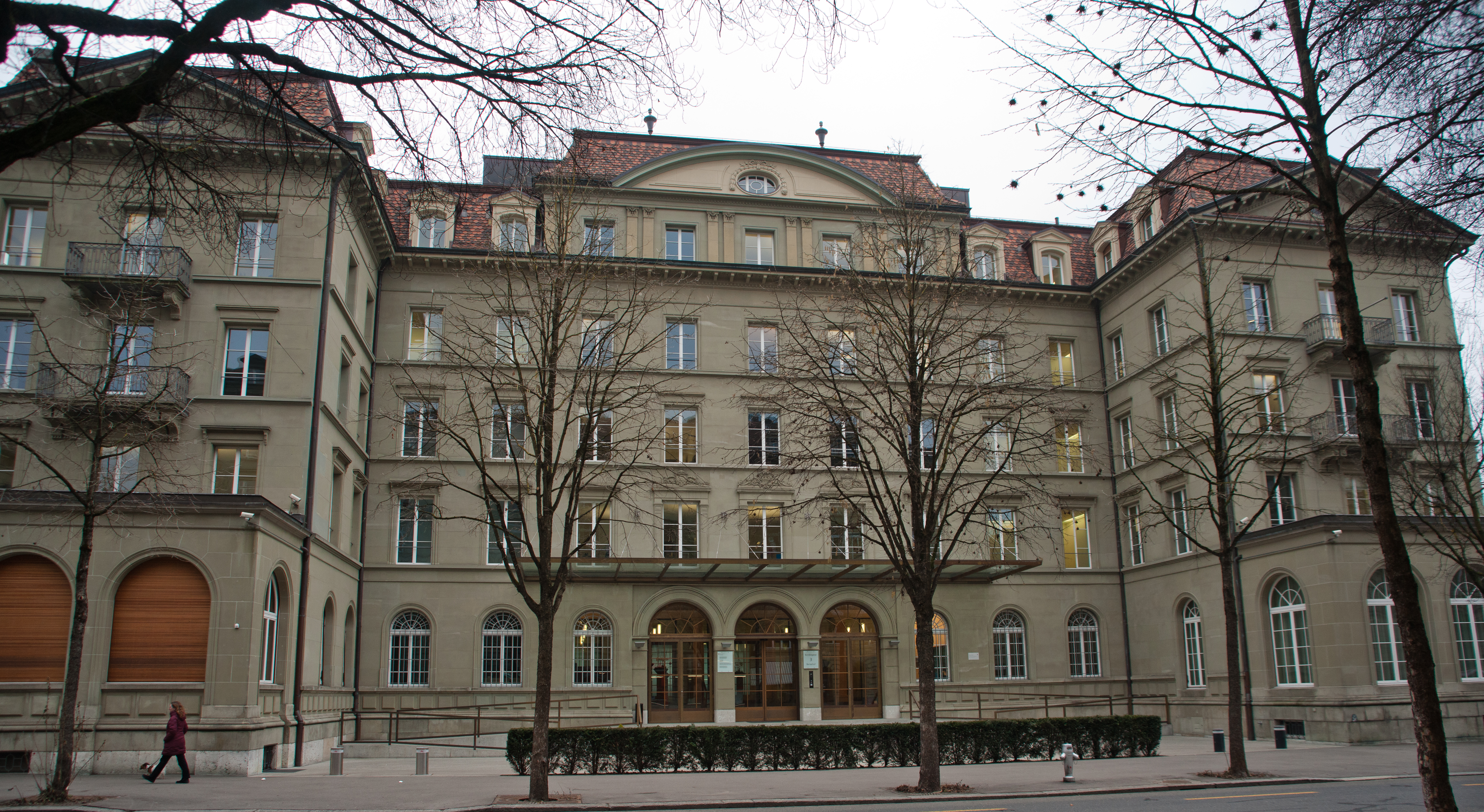
- The Bernerhof, headquarters of the Federal Department of Finance (2005).

Agency overview
- Formed: 1 March 2010; 16 years ago
- Jurisdiction: Federal administration of Switzerland
- Headquarters: Bern, Switzerland
- Minister responsible: Karin Keller-Sutter, Federal Councillor
- Parent agency: Federal Department of Finance
- Website: www.sif.admin.ch

The State Secretariat for International Finance (SIF) is a Swiss government agency that is responsible for defending Switzerland's interests in international financial, tax and monetary matters. It promotes international competitiveness, the integrity of Switzerland's financial centre, access to foreign financial markets and the stability of the Swiss financial sector.

It is an office of the federal administration of Switzerland under the responsibility of the Federal Department of Finance.

== History ==
The office was established in 2010 due to the 2008 financial crisis and tax issue disputes between Switzerland and other countries such as the UBS tax evasion controversies.

Since 2019, the current Secretary for International Finance is Daniela Stoffel.

In July 2023, the Swiss Financial Innovation Desk, aimed at promoting financial innovation in Switzerland, was established as part of the SIF.

== Full-time positions since 2010 ==
Raw data

Source: "Federal Finance Administration FFA: Data portal".
