= List of Lebanese records in athletics =

The following are the national records in athletics in Lebanon maintained by its athletics federation: Fédération Libanaise d'Athlétisme (FLA).

== Outdoor ==
Key to tables: Awaiting ratification Record not kept by FLA Not ratified or later rescinded by FLA

=== Men ===
| Event | Record | Athlete | Date | Meet | Place | Ref. |
|---|---|---|---|---|---|---|
| 100 m | 10.27 (−1.1 m/s) | Noureddine Hadid | 19 June 2024 | Meeting Internazionale Città di Nembro | Nembro, Italy | |
| 100 m | 10.27 (+1.7 m/s) | Noureddine Hadid | 23 June 2024 | Meeting Guadalajara Atletismo Puma | Guadalajara, Spain | |
| 200 m | 20.59 (−0.7 m/s) | Noureddine Hadid | 1 June 2024 | | Marsa, Malta | |
| 300 m | 33.77 | Tamer Saleh | 10 December 2023 | | Beirut, Lebanon | |
| 400 m | 46.92 | Marc Anthony Ibrahim | 18 May 2024 | Mediterranean U23 Championships | Ismailia, Egypt | |
| 800 m | 1:50.31 | Mohamed Hannouf | 24 June 2023 | Arab Championships | Marrakech, Morocco | |
| 1000 m | 2:24.00 | Ali Mortada | 3 June 2023 | | Beirut, Lebanon | |
| 1500 m | 3:44.11 | Munir Kabbara | 15 April 2022 | Bryan Clay Invitational | Azusa, United States | |
| Mile | 4:07.76 | Zayed Al Sayd | 6 February 2025 | VMC Meet #4 | Melbourne, Australia | |
| Mile (road) | 4:13.9 h | Zayed Al Sayd | 25 April 2026 | Ballarat Road Races | Ballarat, Australia | |
| 3000 m | 7:59.62 | Zayd Al Sayd | 14 December 2024 | On Track Nights: Zatopek: 10 | Melbourne, Australia | |
| 5000 m | 14:13.13 | Zayd Al Sayd | 28 November 2024 | Victorian 5000m Championships | Melbourne, Australia | |
| 5 km (road) | 14:04 | Zayd Al Sayd | 15 June 2025 | Lakeside:5 | Melbourne, Australia | |
| 10,000 m | 30:08.20 | Ali Alrida Kanaan | 10 July 2025 | Lebanese Championships | Beirut, Lebanon | |
| 10 km (road) | 29:45 | Zayd Al Sayd | 21 September 2025 | Run Prix | Melbourne, Australia | |
| One hour | 18548 m | Hussein Awada | 5 March 2011 | | Beirut, Lebanon | |
| Half marathon | 1:05:28 | Ali Hussein Awada | 28 February 2010 | Limassol Half Marathon | Limassol, Cyprus | |
| Marathon | 2:19:46 | Tony Hanna | 19 October 2025 | Amsterdam Marathon | Amsterdam, Netherlands | |
| 100 km (road) | 11:37:14 | Chawky Reaidy | 27 August 2022 | | Berlin, Germany | |
| 100 km (road) | 8:47:42 | Youssef Assaker | 20 September 2026 | 100 km World Championships | Ames, Spain | |
| 110 m hurdles | 13.87 (+0.6 m/s) | Ahmad Hazer | 7 June 2013 | | Beirut, Lebanon | |
| 400 m hurdles | 48.95 | Mark Anthony Ibrahim | 9 August 2025 | IFAM Oordegem | Oordegem, Belgium | |
| 3000 m steeplechase | 8:44.05 | Munir Kabbara | 14 May 2022 | | Eugene, United States | |
| High jump | 2.27 m | Jean-Claude Rabbath | 23 April 2004 | | Beirut, Lebanon | |
| High jump | 2.27 m | Jean-Claude Rabbath | 12 June 2004 | | Bucharest, Romania | |
| Pole vault | 4.40 m | Mohammed Nasser | 15 October 1971 | | İzmir, Turkey | |
| Long jump | 7.43 m | Marc Habib | 22 July 2004 | | Jamhour, Lebanon | |
| Triple jump | 14.89 m (−0.7 m/s) | Patrick Hanna | 20 July 2014 | Ontario Championships | Ottawa, Canada | |
| Triple jump | 15.39 m (+0.4 m/s) | Patrick Hanna | 22 June 2016 | Aileen Meagher International Classic | Halifax, Canada | |
| Shot put | 18.00 m | Christopher Saikalis | 13 May 2016 | GVSU Second to Last Chance | Allendale, United States | |
| Shot put | 18.43 m | Christopher Saikalis | 16 April 2016 | | Rochester, United States | |
| Discus throw | 54.15 m | Georges Hachem | 24 September 2004 | | Beirut, Lebanon | |
| Hammer throw | 58.41 m | Abdallah Adib Shaheen | 19 April 2013 | Soka Peace Invitational | Aliso Viejo, United States | |
| Javelin throw | 65.16 m | Nabil Akkoumi | 12 August 2022 | Lebanese Open Clubs Federation Cup | Beirut, Lebanon | |
| Decathlon | 6873 pts h | Elie Sfeir | 29–30 August 1975 | | Algiers, Algeria | |
| Decathlon | 100m (wind) / Long jump (wind) / Shot put / High jump / 400m / 110m H (wind) / Discus / Pole vault / Javelin / 1500m; 11.48 / 7.17 m / 11.55 m / 1.86 m / 54.60 / 15.70 / 34.68 m / 3.90 m / 54.80 m / 4:34.60 | | | | | |
| 3000 m walk (track) | 12:56.01 | Ali Ismail | 20 May 2011 | | Kyiv, Ukraine | |
| 5000 m walk (track) | 22:38.41 (Note: outdoor best; indoor mark ratified as absolute record) | Ali Ismail | 15 May 2011 | | Irpin, Ukraine | |
| 10 km walk (road) | 43:39 | Ali Ismail | 24 June 2012 | | Lutsk, Ukraine | |
| 20 km walk (road) | 1:35:20 | Ali Ismail | 9 June 2012 | | Sumy, Ukraine | |
| 4 × 100 m relay | 41.05 | Lebanon; Dimitri Habib; Tamer Saleh; Marc-Anthony Ibrahim; Andrew Dani | 21 July 2024 | | Beirut, Lebanon | |
| 4 × 200 m relay | 1:31.25 | | 20 December 2015 | | Jamhour, Lebanon | |
| 4 × 400 m relay | 3:11.74 | Lebanon; Noureddine Hadid; Marc Anthony Ibrahim; Ali H. Mourtada; Mohamad Mortada | 4 August 2023 | Jeux de la Francophonie | Kinshasa, Democratic Republic of the Congo | |

=== Women ===
| Event | Record | Athlete | Date | Meet | Place | Ref. |
|---|---|---|---|---|---|---|
| 100 m | 11.54 (+1.4 m/s) | Aziza Sbaity | 27 May 2023 | Kurpfalz Gala | Weinheim, Germany | |
| 200 m | 23.56 (+1.4 m/s) | Gretta Taslakian | 24 November 2007 | Pan Arab Games | Cairo, Egypt | |
| 300 m | 39.37 | Aziza Sbaity | 20 December 2020 | | Beirut, Lebanon | |
| 400 m | 52.72 | Rasha Badrani | 19 April 2025 | Mt. SAC Relays | Walnut, United States | |
| 800 m | 2:11.49 | Saria Traboulsi | 25 July 2013 | | Beirut, Lebanon | |
| 1000 m | 2:53.59 | Saria Traboulsi | 10 August 2013 | | Jamhour, Lebanon | |
| 1500 m | 4:32.44 | Nadia Dagher | 25 June 2015 | | Berlin, Germany | |
| 3000 m | 9:48.00 | Nadia Dagher | 19 May 2016 | | Berlin, Germany | |
| 5000 m | 16:53.89 | Nadia Dagher | 25 May 2016 | | Koblenz, Germany | |
| 5 km (road) | 17:50+ | Chirine Njeim | 17 July 2016 | Chicago Half Marathon | Chicago, United States | |
| 10,000 m | 36:31.80 | Maria-Pia Nehmé | 12 July 2019 | Soirée Rouge et Or | Laval, Canada | |
| 10 km (road) | 36:00+ | Chirine Njeim | 17 July 2016 | Chicago Half Marathon | Chicago, United States | |
| 15 km (road) | 55:21+ | Nesrine Leene-Njeim | 1 December 2024 | Valencia Marathon | Valencia, Spain | |
| 20 km (road) | 1:13:52+ | Nesrine Leene-Njeim | 1 December 2024 | Valencia Marathon | Valencia, Spain | |
| Half marathon | 1:16:02 | Chirine Njeim | 6 March 2021 | | The Woodlands, United States | |
| 25 km (road) | 1:32:29+ | Nesrine Leene-Njeim | 1 December 2024 | Valencia Marathon | Valencia, Spain | |
| 30 km (road) | 1:51:04+ | Nesrine Leene-Njeim | 1 December 2024 | Valencia Marathon | Valencia, Spain | |
| Marathon | 2:36:09 | Nesrine Leene-Njeim | 1 December 2024 | Valencia Marathon | Valencia, Spain | |
| 100 km (road) | 9:07.31 | Kathia Rached | 27 August 2022 | | Berlin, Germany | |
| 100 m hurdles | 14.55 (+2.0 m/s) | Rasha Badrani | 9 March 2024 | | Fullerton, United States | |
| 400 m hurdles | 57.79 | Rasha Badrani | 5 April 2025 | UC San Diego Triton Invitational | San Diego, United States | |
| 2000 m steeplechase | 7:26.83 | Loaa Zaarour | 26 June 2021 | | Beirut, Lebanon | |
| 3000 m steeplechase | 11:42.87 | Sama Mostafa | 21 June 2026 | Arab Athletics U23 Championships | Ismailia, Egypt | |
| High jump | 1.72 m | Carine Bouchakjian | 11 August 2000 | | Jamhour, Lebanon | |
| Pole vault | 2.10 m | Jana Majed | 8 July 2010 | 7th Beirut Municipality Tournament | Beirut, Lebanon | |
| Long jump | 5.87 m (−0.5 m/s) | Krystel Saneh | 24 April 2021 | | Beirut, Lebanon | |
| Triple jump | 12.08 m (Note: not ratified by FLA but recognised by World Athletics) | Sandra Gabrael | 25 October 2003 | | Sydney, Australia | |
| Triple jump | 11.85 m (+0.9 m/s) | Rania Estephan | 2 July 2001 | | Beirut, Lebanon | |
| Shot put | 12.39 m | Leila Corhani | 16 May 2002 | | Jamhour, Lebanon | |
| Discus throw | 41.30 m | Jeannette Ayoub | 1986 | | Teheran, Iran | |
| Hammer throw | 44.66 m | Mariam Youssef | 7 April 2025 | West Asian Clubs Championships | Doha, Qatar | |
| Javelin throw | 38.00 m | Janet Said | 16 July 2010 | Lebanese Championships | Jamhour, Lebanon | |
| Heptathlon | 4314 pts | Zeina Mina | 19–20 August 1983 | | Amman, Jordan | |
| Heptathlon | 100m H (wind) / High jump / Shot put / 200m (wind) / Long jump (wind) / Javelin / 800m; 15.52 / 1.60 m / 8.56 m / 27.45 / 4.96 m / 27.18 m / 2:27.73 | | | | | |
| 3000 m walk (track) | 16:05.44 | Sandy Karam | 21 July 2013 | | Jamhour, Lebanon | |
| 5000 m walk (track) | 27:09.00 | Sandy Karam | 24 May 2014 | | Beirut, Lebanon | |
| 10,000 m walk (track) | 57:05.61 | Sandy Karam | 4 June 2016 | Mediterranean U23 Championships | Radès, Tunisia | |
| 10 km walk (road) | 1:04:12+ | Sandy Karam | 10 July 2015 | Universiade | Gwangju, South Korea | |
| 20 km walk (road) | 2:09:54 | Sandy Karam | 10 July 2015 | Universiade | Gwangju, South Korea | |
| 50 km walk (road) | | | | | | |
| 4 × 100 m relay | 46.91 | Lebanon; Haya Kobrosly; Lynn Ghazawi; Racha Badrani; Mayssa Mouawad | 8 July 2024 | Arab U23 Championships | Ismailia, Egypt | |
| 4 × 200 m relay | 1:52.70 | Team CSJ; Joy Abou-Sleiman; Céline Keyrouz; Rebecca Kassab; Joelle Feghali | 25 March 2013 | | Jamhour, Lebanon | |
| 4 × 400 m relay | 3:53.90 | Team Maristes; Nathalie Saikali; Reine Bejjani; Mirvat Hamzé; Gretta Taslakian | 3 August 2002 | | Jamhour, Lebanon | |

=== Mixed ===
| Event | Record | Athlete | Date | Meet | Place | Ref. |
|---|---|---|---|---|---|---|
| 4 × 400 m relay | 3:32.60 | Lebanon; Mohamad Mortada; Marc Anthony Ibrahim; Aziza Sbaity; Maria Nohra | 26 April 2023 | West Asian Championships | Doha, Qatar | |

== Indoor ==
=== Men ===
| Event | Record | Athlete | Date | Meet | Place | Ref. |
|---|---|---|---|---|---|---|
| 60 m | 6.71 | Tamer Saleh | 14 February 2025 | Badgers Windy City Invite | Chicago, United States | |
| 200 m | 21.00 | Noureddine Hadid | 21 February 2025 | Arkansas Qualifier | Fayetteville, United States | |
| 300 m | 34.04 | Tamer Saleh | 10 January 2026 | UK Rod McCravy Memorial | Louisville, United States | |
| 400 m | 47.55 | Mark Anthony Ibrahim | 30 January 2026 | Bob Pollock Invitational | Clemson, United States | |
| 500 m | 1:05.63 | Rani Marhaba | 8 February 2019 | David Hemery Valentine Invitational | Boston, United States | |
| 600 m | 1:23.13 | Rani Marhaba | 3 February 2019 | Sykes & Sabock Challenge Cup | University Park, United States | |
| 800 m | 1:54.39 | Peter Khoury | 2 February 2020 | | Istanbul, Turkey | |
| 1000 m | 2:52.32 (Note: record set during heptathlon competition) | Ali Hazer | 25 February 2010 | Asian Championships | Tehran, Iran | |
| 1000 m | 2:34.59 | Rani Marhaba | 19 January 2019 | Cornell Upstate Challenge | Ithaca, United States | |
| 1500 m | 3:53.60 | Peter Alkhoury | 7 February 2021 | Turkish Championships | Istanbul, Turkey | |
| 3000 m | 8:19.29 | Munir Kabbara | 27 January 2023 | BU John Thomas Terrier Classic | Boston, United States | |
| 3000 m | 8:13.55 OT | Munir Kabbara | 29 February 2020 | MPSF Championships | Seattle, United States | |
| 5000 m | 14:33.77 | Munir Kabbara | 27 January 2023 | BU John Thomas Terrier Classic | Boston, United States | |
| 60 m hurdles | 8.20 | Ahmad Hazer | 11 February 2018 | | Vienna, Austria | |
| High jump | 2.24 m | Jean-Claude Rabbath | 7 February 2007 | | Weinheim, Germany | |
| Pole vault | 3.40 m (Note: record set during heptathlon competition) | Ali Hazer | 25 February 2010 | Asian Championships | Tehran, Iran | |
| Pole vault | 3.40 m | Patrick Hanna | 4 February 2012 | Classique Corsaire Chaparal | Ottawa, Canada | |
| Long jump | 7.41 m | Gaby Issa El Khoury | 4 February 1984 | | Paris, France | |
| Triple jump | 14.76 m (Note: by World Athletics source) | Patrick Hanna | 14 March 2015 | | Montreal, Canada | |
| Triple jump | 15.78 m | Patrick Hanna | 5 December 2015 | | Toronto, Canada | |
| Shot put | 17.75 m | Christopher Saikalis | 11 March 2017 | NCAA Division II Championships | Birmingham, United States | |
| Heptathlon | 4813 pts | Ali Hazer | 24–25 February 2010 | Asian Championships | Tehran, Iran | |
| Heptathlon | 60m / Long jump / Shot put / High jump / 60m H / Pole vault / 1000m; 7.16 / 6.43 m / 11.59 m / 1.83 m / 8.45 / 3.40 m / 2:52.36 | | | | | |
| 5000 m walk | 21:22.72 | Ali Ismail | 27 January 2012 | | Zaporizhia, Ukraine | |
| 10,000 m walk | 46:23.16 | Ali Ismail | 16 February 2012 | | Sumy, Ukraine | |
| 4 × 200 m relay | 1:36.12 | Noureddine Hadid; Ramzi Naim; Abdo Hélou; Simon Hammam | 21 December 2019 | | Istanbul, Turkey | |
| 4 × 400 m relay | | | | | | |

=== Women ===
| Event | Record | Athlete | Date | Meet | Place | Ref. |
|---|---|---|---|---|---|---|
| 60 m | 7.47 | Aziza Sbaity | 18 March 2022 | World Championships | Belgrade, Serbia | |
| 200 m | 23.73 A | Rasha Badrani | 6 February 2026 | New Mexico Collegiate Classic | Albuquerque, United States | |
| 400 m | 52.81 A | Rasha Badrani | 8 February 2025 | Wolf Pack Classic | Reno, United States | |
| 800 m | 2:12.70 A | Rasha Badrani | 31 January 2026 | New Mexico Team Open | Albuquerque, United States | |
| 1000 m | 3:06.65 | Lina Jaafar | 14 February 2019 | MIAA Division 1 Championships | Massachusetts, United States | |
| 1500 m | 4:52.0 h | Natasha Farran | 23 January 1998 | | Kyiv, Ukraine | |
| 3000 m | 9:52.98 | Maria Pia Nehmé | 23 January 2015 | 20th Annual McGill Team Challenge | Montreal, Canada | |
| 60 m hurdles | 9.37 | Krystel Saneh | 20 February 2016 | Asian Championships | Doha, Qatar | |
| High jump | 1.51 m | Krystel Saneh | 16 February 2014 | Asian Championships | Hangzhou, China | |
| High jump | 1.51 m | Nourhane El Kouche | 9 January 2016 | | Prague, Czech Republic | |
| Pole vault | | | | | | |
| Long jump | 5.33 m (Note: record set during pentathlon competition) | Krystel Saneh | 15 February 2013 | | Teheran, Iran | |
| Triple jump | 10.51 m | Joy Abou Sleiman | 13 December 2018 | | Eaubonne, France | |
| Shot put | 8.66 m | Krystel Saneh | 11 February 2017 | | Rud, Iran | |
| Shot put | 8.90 m | Kiera Sleiman | 12 February 2022 | MSTCA Last Chance | Boston, United States | |
| Pentathlon | 3129 pts | Krystel Saneh | 16 February 2014 | Asian Championships | Hangzhou, China | |
| Pentathlon | 60m H / High jump / Shot put / Long jump / 800m; 9.39 / 1.51 m / 8.43 m / 5.30 m / 2:37.90 | | | | | |
| 3000 m walk | | | | | | |
| 4 × 400 m relay | | | | | | |
