= Daniela Stoffel =

Swiss diplomat

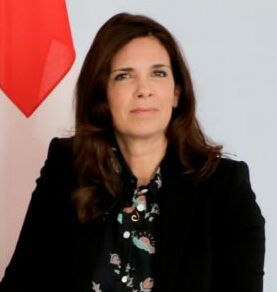
Daniela Stoffel (2019)

Daniela Stoffel (born 1968) is a Swiss diplomat. She has been State Secretary for International Finance at the Federal Department of Finance since 1 March 2019.

== Career ==
Daniela Stoffel studied philosophy, economics and linguistics at the University of Zurich and completed her studies in 1996. Two years later she joined the diplomatic service of the Department of Foreign Affairs (EDA). In the following years she took on leadership roles in Washington, D.C., Berlin and Paris.

From 2015, Stoffel worked for the State Secretariat for International Financial Affairs, where she most recently headed the political staff. From 2016 she also worked as a diplomatic advisor to the head of the EFD department.

She was named Swiss ambassador to the United Arab Emirates and Bahrain in December 2018, but she did not take up the post because she was assigned to the ministry of Finance in January 2019.

Daniela Stoffel has a daughter. She lives in Winterthur, in the canton of Zurich.
