= Yang Mingxia =

Chinese racewalker (born 1990)

Yang Mingxia (born January 13, 1990, in Danfeng County, Shangluo, Shaanxi) is a female Chinese race walker. She represented her country at the 20 km (12 mi) race walk event at the 2008 Summer Olympics, but was disqualified. She previously finished fourth in an IAAF Race Walking Challenge meet in 2008.

== Achievements ==
Year	Tournament	Venue	Result	Event
2008	Olympic Games	Beijing, PR China	DSQ	20 km
2009	World Championships	Berlin, Germany	18th	20 km
2013	Universiade	Kazan, Russia	2nd	20 km walk team
