= Ahmed Al-Yaari =

Yemeni sprinter

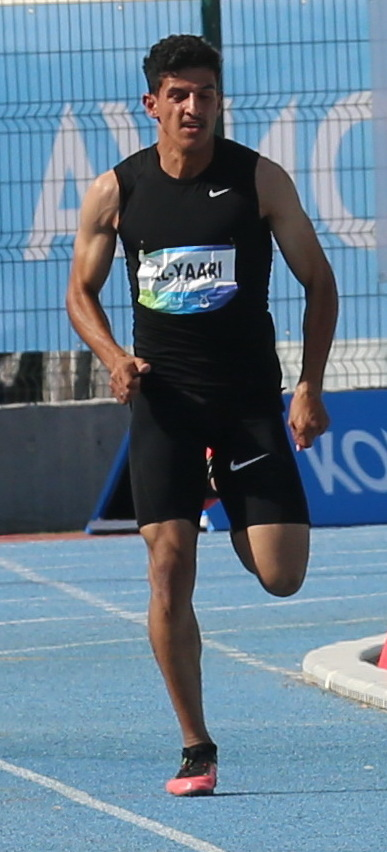
- Ahmed Al-Yaari in 2022

Personal information
- Full name: Ahmed Abdullah Saad Al-Yaari
- Nationality: Yemeni
- Born: 16 January 2000 (age 26)

Sport
- Sport: Athletics
- Event: 400 metres

Ahmed Abdullah Saad Al-Yaari (born 16 January 2000) is a Yemeni sprinter specialising in the 400 metres. He represented Yemen at the 2020 Summer Olympics. He is the Yemeni record holder in the 200 and 400 metres dash.

== Career ==
Al-Yaari began his international career for Yemen at the 2017 Asian Youth Athletics Championships. He then competed at the Asian Athletics Championships where he finished in 24th place. He was scheduled to represent Yemen at the 2018 IAAF World U20 Championships in the 400 metres, however, he did not start.

In April 2019 at the Asian Athletics Championships, Al-Yaari set the Yemeni national record in the 400 metres with a time of 48.27. In September 2019 at the World Athletics Championships, Al-Yaari set the Yemeni national record in the 200 metres with a time of 22.37.

Al-Yaari represented Yemen at the 2020 Summer Olympics in the 400 metres.

== International competitions ==
Year	Competition	Venue	Position	Event	Notes
Representing Yemen
2017	Asian Youth Championships	Bangkok, Thailand	5th	1500 m	4:02.51
2017	Asian Championships	Bhubaneswar, India	24th (h)	800 m	1:55.86
2019	Asian Championships	Doha, Qatar	27th (h)	200 m	22.34
2019	Asian Championships	Doha, Qatar	22nd (h)	400 m	48.27 NR
2019	World Championships	Doha, Qatar	49th (h)	200 m	22.37 NR
2021	Olympic Games	Tokyo, Japan	46th (h)	400 m	48.53
2022	Islamic Solidarity Games	Konya, Turkey	22nd (sf)	200 m	22.34 (w)
2022	Islamic Solidarity Games	Konya, Turkey	11th (h)	400 m	48.76
2022	Islamic Solidarity Games	Konya, Turkey	13th (h)	800 m	1:53.16
2023	Arab Games	Oran, Algeria	12th (h)	200 m	22.27
