= List of Yemeni records in athletics =

The following are the national records in athletics in the Republic of Yemen maintained by Yemen's national athletics federation: Yemen Amateur Athletic Federation (YAAF).

== Outdoor ==
Key to tables: Awaiting ratification Record not kept by YAAF Not ratified or later rescinded by YAAF

=== Men ===
Event	Record	Athlete	Date	Meet	Place	Ref.
100 m	10.90	Nagib Salem Ahmed	July 1982		Kiev, Soviet Union	
200 m	22.27 (+0.5 m/s)	Ahmed Al-Yaari	7 July 2023	Arab Games	Oran, Algeria	
400 m	48.27	Ahmed Al-Yaari	21 April 2019	Asian Championships	Doha, Qatar	
800 m	1:48.24	Saeed Basweiden	13 May 1998		Knoxville, United States	
800 m	1:48.00	Abdullah Al-Yaari	24 May 2023	1st Arab U23 Championships	Radès, Tunisia	
800 m	1:47.98	Abdullah Al-Yaari	22 August 2023	World Championships	Budapest, Hungary	
800 m	1:47.75	Abdullah Al-Yaari	25 May 2024	Gouden Spike	Leiden, Netherlands	
1500 m	3:49.8	Mohamed Abdulkader Al-Halaki	4 October 1991		Latakia, Syria	
3000 m	8:22.43	Nabil Mohamed Al-Garbi	24 July 2009		Aleppo, Syria	
5000 m	14:40.19	Awadh Saleh Nasser	22 July 1994	World Junior Championships	Lisbon, Portugal	
10,000 m	30:49.58	Khalid Al-Etashi	31 July 1992	Olympic Games	Barcelona, Spain	
Half marathon	1:09:28	Essam Saleh Juaime	5 May 2002		Brussels, Belgium	
Marathon	2:40:41	Mohamed Al-Saadi	4 August 1996	Olympic Games	Atlanta, United States	
110 m hurdles	15.83	Christopher Salole	26 November 1962	British Empire and Commonwealth Games	Perth, Australia	
400 m hurdles	53.34	Nasim Ahmed Mansour	16 April 2016		Manama, Bahrain	
3000 m steeplechase	8:57.43	Awadh Saleh Nasser	17 September 1994		Jakarta, Indonesia	
High jump	1.95 m	Abdel Allahi Mahmoud	1976		Aden, Yemen	
Pole vault	3.40 m	Mohamed Nasser Bertouche	1973		Algiers, Algeria	
Long jump	6.55 m	Mutahhar Hasan Al-Haimi	25–28 August 2008		Sana'a, Yemen	
Triple jump	14.17 m	Christopher Salole	February 1962		Australia	
Shot put	13.18 m	Atiq Mohamed Nasir	23/26 April 2010		Sana'a, Yemen	
Discus throw	35.50 m	Ahmed Amin Ahmed	1976		Aden, Yemen	
Hammer throw						
Javelin throw	55.70 m	Atiq Mohamed Nasir	23/26 April 2010		Sana'a, Yemen	
Decathlon						
Decathlon	100m (wind) / Long jump (wind) / Shot put / High jump / 400m / 110m H (wind) / Discus / Pole vault / Javelin / 1500m					
10,000 m walk (track)	49:35.00	Saleh Ramzi	29 May 2024	West Asian Championships	Basra, Iraq	
20 km walk (road)						
50 km walk (road)						
4 × 100 m relay	42.96	Yemen	26 November 1982	Asian Games	New Delhi, India	
4 × 400 m relay	3:18.18	Yemen; W.H. Shaddad; Mohammed Ahmed Al-Yafaei; Salem Al-Qaifi; Saeed Al-Adhroui	9 September 2003		Amman, Jordan	

=== Women ===
Event	Record	Athlete	Date	Meet	Place	Ref.
100 m	13.35	Fatima Suleiman Al-Dahman	22 July 2009		Aleppo, Syria	
200 m	27.53	Fatima Suleiman Al-Dahman	24 November 2007	Pan Arab Games	Cairo, Egypt	
400 m	1:05.22	Fatima Suleiman Al-Dahman	10 October 2008		Amman, Jordan	
800 m	2:36.28	Sally Ahmad Hanif	23 July 2009		Aleppo, Syria	
1500 m	5:20.14	Bilqis Ahmed Sharaf	12 April 2008		Amman, Jordan	
3000 m	11:35.0 h	Bilqis Ahmed Sharaf	22 Jul 2009		Aleppo, Syria	
5000 m	20:55.25	Fatma Al-Orafi	26 October 2007		Amman, Jordan	
10,000 m						
Half marathon	1:48:54	Fatma Al-Orafi	23 November 2007	Pan Arab Games	Cairo, Egypt	
Marathon	4:43:40	Farida Mabrook	16 February 2024	International Ooredoo Marathon	Doha, Qatar	
100 m hurdles	18.0 h	Hikmat Bartouche	14 May 1985		Aden, Yemen	
400 m hurdles	1:04.70	Fatima Suleiman Al-Dahman	24 July 2009		Aleppo, Syria	
3000 m steeplechase						
High jump	1.38 m	Bushra Nageeb	12 May 2007		Sana'a, Yemen	
Pole vault						
Long jump	4.50 m	Amal Kala	28 November 1984		Aden, Yemen	
Triple jump	8.75 m	Hana Srouri	27 October 2007		Amman, Jordan	
Shot put	8.95 m	Majita Ahmed Shawgi	16/17 May 2005		Sana'a, Yemen	
Discus throw	19.35 m	Maha Abdou	5 September 1979		Mogadishu, Somalia	
Hammer throw						
Javelin throw	25.39 m	Hana Srouri	27 October 2007		Amman, Jordan	
Heptathlon						
Heptathlon	100m H (wind) / High jump / Shot put / 200m (wind) / Long jump (wind) / Javelin / 800m					
20 km walk (road)						
4 × 100 m relay	54.87	Yemen	11 October 2008		Amman, Jordan	
4 × 400 m relay	4:27.52	Yemen	11 October 2008		Amman, Jordan	

== Indoor ==
=== Men ===
Event	Record	Athlete	Date	Meet	Place	Ref.
60 m	7.32	Mohamed Ali Samantar	18 January 1985	World Indoor Games	Paris, France	
200 m	22.95	Mohamed Ali Samantar	19 January 1985	World Indoor Games	Paris, France	
400 m	49.25	Ahmed Al-Yaari	9 January 2023	Qatari Championships	Doha, Qatar	
800 m	1:49.33	Saeed Basweiden	27 February 1999	Virginia Tech Elite	Blacksburg, United States	
1500 m	4:02.17	Ebrahim Shabil	20 February 2016	Asian Championships	Doha, Qatar	
3000 m	8:54.71	Noor Aldeen Al-Humaidha	21 February 2016	Asian Championships	Doha, Qatar	
60 m hurdles						
High jump						
Pole vault						
Long jump						
Triple jump						
Shot put	10.93 m	Mohamed Nasser Al-Badawi	15 November 2005	Asian Indoor Games	Pattaya, Thailand	
Heptathlon						
Heptathlon	60m / Long jump / Shot put / High jump / 60m H / Pole vault / 1000m					
5000 m walk						
4 × 400 m relay						

=== Women ===
Event	Record	Athlete	Date	Meet	Place	Ref.
60 m	8.91	Hikmat Bartouche	19 January 1985	World Indoor Games	Paris, France	
200 m						
400 m						
800 m						
1500 m						
3000 m						
60 m hurdles						
High jump						
Pole vault						
Long jump						
Triple jump						
Shot put						
Pentathlon						
Pentathlon	60m H / High jump / Shot put / Long jump / 800m					
3000 m walk						
4 × 400 m relay						
