= Rud, Nishapur =

Rud رود
- Village
- Location within Iran
- Coordinates: 36°14′53″N 58°55′04″E
- Country: Iran
- Province: Razavi Khorasan
- County: Nishapur
- Bakhsh: Central
- Rural District: Fazl

Population (2006)
  - Total: 237
- Time zone: UTC+3:30 (IRST)
  - Summer (DST): UTC+4:30 (IRDT)

Rud (Persian: رود, also Romanized as Rūd) is a village in Fazl Rural District, in the Central District of Nishapur County, Razavi Khorasan Province, Iran. At the 2006 census, its population was 237, in 67 families. This village is situated next to one of the biggest campgrounds of the country called Baghrud.
