= Abdullah Al-Yaari =

Yemeni middle-distance runner

Personal information
- Nationality: Yemeni
- Born: 5 July 2003 (age 22)

Sport
- Country: Yemen
- Sport: Athletics
- Event: Middle-distance running

Achievements and titles
- Personal best: 800 m: NR 1:48.00 (2023)

Abdullah Al-Yaari (Arabic: عبدالله محمد عبدالله اليعري; born 5 July 2003) is a Yemeni sprinter who specializes in the 800 metres.

== Biography ==
Al-Yaari comes from Dhamar Governorate. He became the first Yemeni athlete to ever advance from the qualification round of an international competition when he qualified for the semi-finals of the 800 metres at the 2021 World Under-20 Championships in Nairobi, Kenya.

In April 2023, Al-Yaari won the 800m gold medal at the West Asian Athletics Championships in Qatar, ahead of Oman's Hussain Mahmoud Al-Farsi and Qatar's Mubarak Rabi Mahmoud. The Yemeni ambassador to Qatar, Rajeh Badi, extended his congratulations to Al-Yaari for the win.

His personal best time is 1:48.00 minutes in the 800 metres, achieved at the 2023 Arab U23 Championships in Radès.
