= Athletics at the 2007 Summer Universiade – Men's 4 × 100 metres relay =

The men's 4 × 100 metres relay event at the 2007 Summer Universiade was held on 9 July.

== Medalists ==
Gold	Silver	Bronze
Thailand; Pirom Autas; Wachara Sondee; Sompote Suwannarangsri; Sittichai Suwonprateep	South Africa; Hannes Dreyer; Leigh Julius; Hendrik Kotze; Snyman Prinsloo; Petrus Koekemoer*	China; Wang Xiaoxu; Zhang Peimeng; Du Bing; Yin Hualong

*Athletes who participated in heats only.

== Results ==
=== Heats ===
Qualification: First 3 teams of each heat (Q) plus the next 2 fastest (q) qualified for the final.

Rank	Heat	Nation	Athletes	Time	Notes
1	2	Thailand	Pirom Autas, Wachara Sondee, Sompote Suwannarangsri, Sittichai Suwonprateep	39.47	Q
2	1	Great Britain	Ryan Scott, Simon Farenden, Darren Chin, Simeon Williamson	39.78	Q
3	1	South Africa	Hannes Dreyer, Leigh Julius, Petrus Koekemoer, Snyman Prinsloo	39.89	Q
4	2	Japan	Naohiro Shinada, Hitoshi Saito, Tomoya Kamiyama, Masashi Eriguchi	39.98	Q
5	1	China	Wang Xiaoxu, Zhang Peimeng, Du Bing, Yin Hualong	40.08	Q
6	2	Estonia	Rene Oruman, Henri Sool, Martin Vihmann, Mart Kroodo	41.07	Q
7	2	Malaysia	Mohd Syarafie Sauli, Ravindran Shanmuganathan, Mohd Latif Nyat, Narendran Shanmuganathan	41.07	q
8	2	Ghana	Michael Osei-Owusu, Ernest Ofei-Brako, Eugehe Ricky Asante, Christopher Kofi Gyapong	41.27	q
9	1	Hong Kong	Lui Ka Ho, Lau Yu Leong, Leung Ki Ho, Wong Ka Chun	41.38	
10	2	Denmark	Steffen Jorgensen, Nicklas Hyde, Mare Lorentzen, Jacob Wolfgang	41.93	
11	2	Uganda	Rogers Aheebwa, Moses Edweu Ejobu, Julius Kasule, John Kennedy Okewling	43.27	
12	1	Sri Lanka	Ruchiru Samarasingha, Nalin Thilakarathne, Rangana Jayathilaka, Hithanadura Lasitha Silva	43.69	
	1	Czech Republic		DNS	

=== Final ===
Rank	Lane	Nation	Athletes	Time	Notes
1st place, gold medalist(s)	5	Thailand	Pirom Autas, Wachara Sondee, Sompote Suwannarangsri, Sittichai Suwonprateep	39.15	
2nd place, silver medalist(s)	4	South Africa	Hannes Dreyer, Leigh Julius, Hendrik Kotze, Snyman Prinsloo	39.20	
3rd place, bronze medalist(s)	7	China	Wang Xiaoxu, Zhang Peimeng, Du Bing, Yin Hualong	39.30	
4	6	Great Britain	Ryan Scott, Simon Farenden, Darren Chin, Simeon Williamson	39.31	
5	3	Japan	Naohiro Shinada, Hitoshi Saito, Tomoya Kamiyama, Shinichiro Iwamoto	39.45	
6	8	Malaysia	Mohd Syarafie Sauli, Ravindran Shanmuganathan, Mohd Latif Nyat, Narendran Shanmuganathan	40.60	
7	1	Ghana	Michael Osei-Owusu, Ernest Ofei-Brako, Eugehe Ricky Asante, Christopher Kofi Gyapong	41.34	
	2	Estonia	Rene Oruman, Henri Sool, Martin Vihmann, Tarmo Jallai	DNF	FS1
