= Athletics at the 2007 Summer Universiade – Men's 200 metres =

Universiade 200m

The men's 200 metres event at the 2007 Summer Universiade was held on 12–13 August.

== Medalists ==
Gold	Silver	Bronze
Amr Ibrahim Mostafa Seoud; Egypt	Leigh Julius; South Africa	Tomoya Kamiyama; Japan

== Results ==
=== Heats ===
Qualification: First 4 of each heat (Q) and the next 4 fastest (q) qualified for the quarterfinals.

Wind: Heat 1: -1.8 m/s, Heat 2: +0.9 m/s, Heat 3: -0.2 m/s, Heat 4: -1.0 m/s, Heat 5: -0.7 m/s, Heat 6: -0.8 m/s, Heat 7: +0.2 m/s

Rank	Heat	Name	Nationality	Time	Notes
1	2	Gavin Smellie	Canada	20.81	Q
2	2	Amr Ibrahim Mostafa Seoud	Egypt	20.88	Q, PB
3	6	Tomoya Kamiyama	Japan	21.02	Q
4	7	Christopher Kofi Gyapong	Ghana	21.13	Q, PB
5	2	Žilvinas Adomavičius	Lithuania	21.23	Q, PB
6	4	Franklin Nazareno	Ecuador	21.26	Q
7	6	Nicklas Hyde	Denmark	21.30	Q, PB
8	2	Snyman Prinsloo	South Africa	21.38	Q
9	3	Félix Martínez	Puerto Rico	21.42	Q, PB
10	3	Simon Farenden	Great Britain	21.48	Q
11	4	Bobby Young	Liberia	21.50	Q
12	2	Martin Vihmann	Estonia	21.54	q
12	7	Jan Schiller	Czech Republic	21.54	Q
14	6	Darren Chin	Great Britain	21.56	Q
15	7	Hitoshi Saito	Japan	21.58	Q
16	6	Henri Sool	Estonia	21.73	Q
17	7	Lee Junwoo	South Korea	21.75	Q
18	3	Leung Ki Ho	Hong Kong	21.78	Q
19	3	Konstantinos Papandonoudis	Greece	21.80	Q
20	2	Narendran Shanmuganathan	Malaysia	21.82	q
21	5	Leigh Julius	South Africa	21.83	Q
22	4	Frank Puriza	Namibia	21.84	Q
23	4	Andrew Dargie	Canada	21.89	Q
24	6	Sittichai Suwonprateep	Thailand	22.02	q
25	7	Waldy Lindeborg	Netherlands Antilles	22.22	q
26	1	Cyrus Wesley	Liberia	22.23	Q
27	6	Albert Adjekum Essuman	Ghana	22.26	
28	1	Khoo Kian Seong Kenneth	Singapore	22.27	Q
29	2	Chao Un Kei	Macau	22.28	
30	4	Tshepang Tshube	Botswana	22.36	
31	2	Lui Ka Ho	Hong Kong	22.39	
32	1	Siriroj Darasuriyong	Thailand	22.55	Q
32	5	Geronimo Goeloe	Netherlands Antilles	22.55	Q
34	1	Ravindran Shanmuganathan	Malaysia	22.57	Q
35	6	Hithanadura Lasitha Silva	Sri Lanka	22.85	
36	1	Mmoloki Seele	Botswana	22.87	
36	5	Malamine Diame	Senegal	22.87	Q
38	5	Jacob Bolo	Kenya	23.13	Q
39	1	Sou Chon Kin	Macau	23.14	
40	7	Hilary Wesonga Weguld	Kenya	23.38	
41	5	Mubarak Al-Malik	Qatar	23.46	
42	3	Jalal Kazi Shah	Bangladesh	23.63	SB
43	3	Michel Al-Zinati	Lebanon	23.64	
44	5	Leon Choongwe	Zambia	23.77	
45	4	Edgard Ghanime	Lebanon	24.39	
	1	Arnaldo Abrantes	Portugal	DNS	
	1	Dmytro Hlushchenko	Ukraine	DNS	
	3	Adam Miller	Australia	DNS	
	3	John Kennedy Okewling	Uganda	DNS	
	4	Rogers Aheebwa	Uganda	DNS	
	5	Shafiq Kashmiri	Singapore	DNS	
	7	Du Bing	China	DNS	
	7	Sergio Mba Nso	Equatorial Guinea	DNS	

=== Quarterfinals ===
Qualification: First 4 of each heat qualified directly (Q) for the semifinals.

Wind: Heat 1: -0.8 m/s, Heat 2: -0.1 m/s, Heat 3: -0.4 m/s, Heat 4: 0.0 m/s

Rank	Heat	Name	Nationality	Time	Notes
1	1	Amr Ibrahim Mostafa Seoud	Egypt	20.93	Q
2	2	Tomoya Kamiyama	Japan	21.07	Q
3	1	Gavin Smellie	Canada	21.12	Q
4	4	Jan Schiller	Czech Republic	21.18	Q
5	3	Leigh Julius	South Africa	21.21	Q
6	1	Darren Chin	Great Britain	21.23	Q, FS1
7	1	Hitoshi Saito	Japan	21.29	Q
8	1	Nicklas Hyde	Denmark	21.32	
9	4	Franklin Nazareno	Ecuador	21.34	Q
10	3	Christopher Kofi Gyapong	Ghana	21.36	Q
11	2	Žilvinas Adomavičius	Lithuania	21.43	Q
12	4	Félix Martínez	Puerto Rico	21.49	Q
13	3	Martin Vihmann	Estonia	21.60	Q
13	4	Snyman Prinsloo	South Africa	21.60	Q
15	2	Simon Farenden	Great Britain	21.61	Q
16	3	Geronimo Goeloe	Netherlands Antilles	21.63	Q, PB
17	3	Bobby Young	Liberia	21.73	
18	2	Leung Ki Ho	Hong Kong	21.75	Q
19	3	Narendran Shanmuganathan	Malaysia	21.79	
19	4	Khoo Kian Seong Kenneth	Singapore	21.79	PB
21	4	Siriroj Darasuriyong	Thailand	21.99	
22	2	Sittichai Suwonprateep	Thailand	22.08	
23	2	Andrew Dargie	Canada	22.10	
24	1	Waldy Lindeborg	Netherlands Antilles	22.21	
25	1	Konstantinos Papandonoudis	Greece	22.22	
26	2	Cyrus Wesley	Liberia	22.26	
27	3	Malamine Diame	Senegal	22.90	
	1	Lee Junwoo	South Korea	DNS	
	2	Henri Sool	Estonia	DNS	
	3	Frank Puriza	Namibia	DNS	
	4	Jacob Bolo	Kenya	DNS	
	4	Ravindran Shanmuganathan	Malaysia	DNS	

=== Semifinals ===
Qualification: First 4 of each semifinal qualified directly (Q) for the final.

Wind: Heat 1: -0.8 m/s, Heat 2: -0.3 m/s

Rank	Heat	Name	Nationality	Time	Notes
1	2	Gavin Smellie	Canada	20.83	Q
2	2	Leigh Julius	South Africa	20.92	Q
3	1	Tomoya Kamiyama	Japan	20.99	Q
4	2	Amr Ibrahim Mostafa Seoud	Egypt	21.02	Q
5	1	Darren Chin	Great Britain	21.11	Q
6	1	Franklin Nazareno	Ecuador	21.20	Q
7	2	Hitoshi Saito	Japan	21.22	Q
8	1	Jan Schiller	Czech Republic	21.23	Q
9	2	Žilvinas Adomavičius	Lithuania	21.27	FS1
10	1	Félix Martínez	Puerto Rico	21.45	
11	1	Christopher Kofi Gyapong	Ghana	21.50	
12	2	Martin Vihmann	Estonia	21.55	
13	1	Geronimo Goeloe	Netherlands Antilles	21.67	FS1
14	2	Leung Ki Ho	Hong Kong	21.74	
15	1	Snyman Prinsloo	South Africa	22.01	
	2	Simon Farenden	Great Britain	DNS	

=== Final ===
Wind: +0.2 m/s

Rank	Lane	Name	Nationality	Time	Notes
1st place, gold medalist(s)	7	Amr Ibrahim Mostafa Seoud	Egypt	20.74	PB
2nd place, silver medalist(s)	4	Leigh Julius	South Africa	20.96	
3rd place, bronze medalist(s)	3	Tomoya Kamiyama	Japan	20.97	
4	2	Jan Schiller	Czech Republic	21.07	
5	5	Gavin Smellie	Canada	21.09	
6	6	Darren Chin	Great Britain	21.11	
7	1	Franklin Nazareno	Ecuador	21.20	
8	8	Hitoshi Saito	Japan	21.34	
