= Athletics at the 2003 Summer Universiade – Men's 100 metres =

The men's 100 metres event at the 2003 Summer Universiade was held in Daegu, South Korea on 25 and 26 August.

== Medalists ==
Gold	Silver	Bronze
Chris Lambert; Great Britain	Leigh Julius; South Africa	Dejan Vojnović; Croatia

== Results ==
=== Heats ===
Wind:
Heat 1: +0.2 m/s, Heat 2: +0.6 m/s, Heat 3: -0.3 m/s, Heat 4: +0.6 m/s, Heat 5: -0.1 m/s, Heat 6: -0.4 m/s, Heat 7: -0.1 m/s

Rank	Heat	Athlete	Nationality	Time	Notes
1	5	Chris Lambert	Great Britain	10.33	Q
2	4	Aleksandr Ryabov	Russia	10.53	Q
3	1	Leigh Julius	South Africa	10.55	Q
4	7	Wang Peng	China	10.58	Q
5	4	Matic Šušteršic	Slovenia	10.59	Q
5	5	Nobuhiro Tajima	Japan	10.59	Q
7	6	Dejan Vojnović	Croatia	10.60	Q
8	3	Kazuki Ishikura	Japan	10.62	Q
8	6	Nazmizan Mohamed	Malaysia	10.62	Q
10	7	Boštjan Fridrih	Slovenia	10.63	Q
11	3	Roman Smirnov	Russia	10.64	Q
12	3	Liu Yuan-kai	Chinese Taipei	10.69	Q
13	5	Thobias Akwenye	Namibia	10.70	Q
14	1	Gergely Németh	Hungary	10.71	Q
14	2	Malang Sané	Senegal	10.71	Q
14	5	Kang Tae-suk	South Korea	10.71	Q
14	6	Diego Ferreira	Paraguay	10.71	Q
18	4	Xavier James	Bermuda	10.73	Q
19	2	Adam Miller	Australia	10.75	Q
20	2	Benedictus Botha	Namibia	10.80	Q
21	5	Marko Janković	Serbia and Montenegro	10.81	q
22	4	Allar Aasma	Estonia	10.82	Q
23	3	Craig Bearda	New Zealand	10.87	Q
24	4	Alain Olivier Nyoumai	Cameroon	10.89	q
25	1	Prabashitha Caldera	Sri Lanka	10.93	Q
25	3	Lai Ka Pun Ryan	Hong Kong	10.93	q
27	3	Koffi Arsene Kouadio	Ivory Coast	10.95	q
28	5	Gaberieli Waqavanua	Fiji	11.04	
29	7	Raymond Diogo	Uganda	11.10	Q
30	7	Djibril Diatta	Senegal	11.18	Q
31	2	Danny Fredrick	Federated States of Micronesia	11.22	Q
32	4	Eric Chan Chi Hong	Hong Kong	11.23	
33	6	Md. Abdulla Hel Kafi	Bangladesh	11.24	Q
34	7	Wilfried Bingangoye	Gabon	11.24	
35	1	Boikaego Ennetse	Botswana	11.35	Q
36	3	Jaffar Shah	Pakistan	11.38	
37	1	Lei Ka In	Macau	11.45	
38	3	Thushanthan Ariyanayakam	Sri Lanka	11.45	
39	4	Sergio Mba Nsono	Equatorial Guinea	11.50	
39	7	Giancarlo Castro	Peru	11.50	
41	2	Luu Tri Dung	Vietnam	11.52	
42	4	Wong Wai Ip	Macau	11.66	
43	6	Nasser Amor Said Al-Naabi	Oman	11.67	
44	1	Hashin Yousif	Sudan	11.71	
45	2	Rory Forde	Guyana	11.73	
45	5	Jean-Jacques Nkiama	Democratic Republic of the Congo	11.73	
47	2	Tati Paul Makiya	Tanzania	11.81	
48	2	Roberto Salvatierra	Peru	11.82	
49	5	Muhammad Imran	Pakistan	11.97	
50	7	Sarr Seyidi	Mauritania	13.25	
51	6	Ebrahim Al-Shaebi	Yemen	13.27	
52	1	Rolana Nysi	Albania	13.48	

=== Quarterfinals ===
Wind:
Heat 1: +0.8 m/s, Heat 2: -2.0 m/s, Heat 3: -0.1 m/s, Heat 4: +1.9 m/s

Rank	Heat	Athlete	Nationality	Time	Notes
1	1	Chris Lambert	Great Britain	10.31	Q
2	1	Nazmizan Mohamed	Malaysia	10.38	Q
3	4	Nobuhiro Tajima	Japan	10.39	Q
4	4	Wang Peng	China	10.40	Q
5	1	Kazuki Ishikura	Japan	10.42	Q
6	1	Kang Tae-suk	South Korea	10.49	Q
7	3	Leigh Julius	South Africa	10.53	Q
8	4	Thobias Akwenye	Namibia	10.57	Q
9	1	Diego Ferreira	Paraguay	10.60	
10	4	Liu Yuan-kai	Chinese Taipei	10.61	Q
11	2	Dejan Vojnović	Croatia	10.62	Q
12	2	Aleksandr Ryabov	Russia	10.66	Q
13	3	Roman Smirnov	Russia	10.68	Q
14	3	Matic Šušteršic	Slovenia	10.68	Q
15	4	Xavier James	Bermuda	10.69	
16	3	Adam Miller	Australia	10.70	Q
17	2	Boštjan Fridrih	Slovenia	10.74	Q
18	3	Malang Sané	Senegal	10.77	
18	4	Marko Janković	Serbia and Montenegro	10.77	
20	2	Gergely Németh	Hungary	10.79	Q
21	1	Alain Olivier Nyoumai	Cameroon	10.81	
21	1	Prabashitha Caldera	Sri Lanka	10.81	
23	2	Benedictus Botha	Namibia	10.90	
24	4	Raymond Diogo	Uganda	10.92	
25	2	Lai Ka Pun Ryan	Hong Kong	10.94	
26	3	Allar Aasma	Estonia	10.97	
27	3	Koffi Arsene Kouadio	Ivory Coast	10.97	
28	2	Craig Bearda	New Zealand	11.06	
29	4	Djibril Diatta	Senegal	11.15	
30	3	Danny Fredrick	Federated States of Micronesia	11.35	
31	1	Boikaego Ennetse	Botswana	11.36	
32	2	Md. Abdulla Hel Kafi	Bangladesh	11.43	

=== Semifinals ===
Wind:
Heat 1: -0.1 m/s, Heat 2: -2.2 m/s

Rank	Heat	Athlete	Nationality	Time	Notes
1	1	Chris Lambert	Great Britain	10.38	Q
2	2	Dejan Vojnović	Croatia	10.58	Q
3	1	Wang Peng	China	10.60	Q
4	2	Leigh Julius	South Africa	10.61	Q
5	1	Kazuki Ishikura	Japan	10.66	Q
5	2	Aleksandr Ryabov	Russia	10.66	Q
5	2	Nobuhiro Tajima	Japan	10.66	Q
8	2	Nazmizan Mohamed	Malaysia	10.68	
9	1	Matic Šušteršic	Slovenia	10.69	Q
10	1	Gergely Németh	Hungary	10.71	
11	1	Roman Smirnov	Russia	10.73	
12	2	Kang Tae-suk	South Korea	10.76	
13	2	Boštjan Fridrih	Slovenia	10.79	
14	2	Adam Miller	Australia	10.81	
15	1	Thobias Akwenye	Namibia	10.83	
16	1	Liu Yuan-kai	Chinese Taipei	10.86	

=== Final ===
Wind: -1.2 m/s

Rank	Lane	Athlete	Nationality	Time	Notes
1st place, gold medalist(s)	4	Chris Lambert	Great Britain	10.44	
2nd place, silver medalist(s)	3	Leigh Julius	South Africa	10.50	
3rd place, bronze medalist(s)	5	Dejan Vojnović	Croatia	10.58	
4	2	Nobuhiro Tajima	Japan	10.60	
5	7	Aleksandr Ryabov	Russia	10.65	
6	6	Wang Peng	China	10.66	
7	1	Kazuki Ishikura	Japan	10.71	
8	8	Matic Šušteršic	Slovenia	10.85	
