= Chris Lambert (sprinter) =

British sprinter (born 1981)

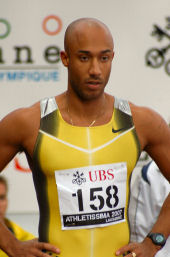

Personal information
- Nationality: British (English)
- Born: 6 April 1981 (age 45) London, England
- Height: 1.88 m (6 ft 2 in)
- Weight: 88 kg (194 lb)

Sport
- Sport: Athletics
- Event: Sprints
- Club: Belgrave Harriers
- Turned pro: 2003

Achievements and titles
- Olympic finals: 2004; 200 m- 1st round DNF
- World finals: 2005; 200 m- 1st round DNS
- Highest world ranking: 10 (Feb 2005)
- Personal bests: 100 m 10.24 (1999); 100 m 10.19w (2002); 200 m 20.34 (2003)
Medal record
Representing Great Britain
European Indoor Championships
Silver medal – second place	2005 Madrid	200 m
Summer Universiade
Gold medal – first place	2003 Daegu	100 m
Bronze medal – third place	2001 Beijing	100 m
European U23 Championships
Gold medal – first place	2003 Bydgoszcz	200 m
Gold medal – first place	2003 Bydgoszcz	4x100 m relay
European Junior Championships
Bronze medal – third place	1999 Riga	200 m

Christopher Patrick Lambert (born 6 April 1981) is a former professional sprinter from England who competed at the 2004 Summer Olympics

== Biography ==
Lambert grew up on Southampton Way Estate in Peckham, London, attending to school at Oliver Goldsmith's Primary School in Camberwell and Haberdashers' Aske's Hatcham College, before attending Harvard University, where he was a member of The Phoenix – S K Club.

As a junior athlete in 1999, Lambert finished 3rd at the European Junior Championships and ran the fastest time in the world over 200 m for an U20 athlete. Named captain of the Great British Junior team in 2000, he was unable to compete for the majority of the season due to a hamstring injury but left the age group ranked 3rd on the national all-time list. At Harvard, Lambert broke 5 college and 3 Ivy League records (for the 60 m, 100 m and 200 m), winning 6 Ivy League titles and finishing 4th in the 2003 NCAA Men's Outdoor Track and Field Championship, becoming an NCAA All-American.

On graduating and beginning a professional career, Lambert won gold in a championship record time at the 2003 European Athletics U23 Championships. He then became an Olympian, securing selection to TeamGB for the 2004 Olympic Games in Athens, but due to injury he surrendered his place on the 4 × 100 m relay team that went on to win the gold medal. He claimed a silver medal at the 2005 European Athletics Indoor Championships then in an injury-plagued career he was also selected for but had to withdraw from the 2002 European Athletics Championships, 2005 IAAF World Championships in Athletics and 2006 Commonwealth Games.

Lambert became the British 200 metres champion after winning the British AAA Championships title at the 2004 AAA Championships.

He finally retired in 2008 due to complications resulting from suffering several stress fractures to the right tibia.

Lambert remains a keen sports fan, focusing on athletics, football (lifelong Arsenal supporter), and golf.

== International competitions ==
Year	Competition	Venue	Position	Event	Notes
Representing Great Britain and England
1998	World Junior Championships	Annecy, France	—	4 × 100 m relay	DQ
1999	European Junior Championships	Riga, Latvia	3rd	200 m	20.67
2001	Summer Universiade	Beijing, China	3rd	100 m	10.38
2003	Summer Universiade	Daegu, South Korea	1st	100 m	10.44
2003	European U23 Championships	Bydgoszcz, Poland	1st	200 m	20.34 (wind: 0.7 m/s)
2003	European U23 Championships	Bydgoszcz, Poland	1st	4 × 100 m relay	39.31
2005	European Indoor Championships	Madrid, Spain	2nd	200 m	20.69
