= Tomoya Kamiyama =

Japanese sprinter (born 1988)

Personal information
- Nationality: Japanese
- Born: 21 February 1988 (age 38) Tochigi Prefecture, Japan
- Education: Sakushin Gakuin University
- Height: 1.74 m (5 ft 9 in)
- Weight: 67 kg (148 lb)

Sport
- Country: Japan
- Sport: Track and field
- Event: 200 metres

Achievements and titles
- Personal best: 20.69 (Osaka 2007)
Medal record
Men's athletics
Representing Japan
Universiade
Bronze medal – third place	2007 Bangkok	200 m

Tomoya Kamiyama (神山 知也, Kamiyama Tomoya; born 21 February 1988 in Tochigi Prefecture) is a Japanese sprinter who specialized in the 200 metres. He competed at the 2007 World Championships reaching the quarterfinals. He also won a bronze medal at the 2007 Universiade.

== Personal best ==
Event	Time (s)	Competition	Venue	Date
200 m	20.69 (wind: +1.2 m/s)	Japanese Championships	Osaka, Japan	30 June 2007

== International competition ==
Year	Competition	Venue	Position	Event	Time (s)
Representing Japan
2007	Universiade	Bangkok, Thailand	3rd	200 m	20.97 (wind: +0.2 m/s)
2007	Universiade	Bangkok, Thailand	5th	4×100 m relay	39.45 (relay leg: 3rd)
2007	World Championships	Osaka, Japan	26th (qf)	200 m	20.89 (wind: -0.3 m/s)
