= 2008 African Championships in Athletics – Men's 200 metres =

The men's 200 metres event at the 2008 African Championships in Athletics was held at the Addis Ababa Stadium on May 3–4.

== Medalists ==
Gold	Silver	Bronze
Thuso Mpuang; South Africa	Stéphan Buckland; Mauritius	Fanuel Kenosi; Botswana

== Results ==
=== Heats ===
Qualification: First 3 of each heat (Q) and the next 6 fastest (q) qualified for the semifinals.

Wind: Heat 1: -2.1 m/s, Heat 2: -1.8 m/s, Heat 3: -0.2 m/s, Heat 4: -1.0 m/s, Heat 5: -1.8 m/s, Heat 6: -0.7 m/s

Rank	Heat	Name	Nationality	Time	Notes
1	4	Obinna Metu	Nigeria	20.81	Q
2	6	Thuso Mpuang	South Africa	21.05	Q
3	5	Khalid Idrissi Zougari	Morocco	21.09	Q
4	4	Seth Amoo	Ghana	21.14	Q
5	1	Stéphan Buckland	Mauritius	21.18	Q
6	3	Hitjivirue Kaanjuka	Namibia	21.18	Q
7	5	Soleiman Salem Ayed	Egypt	21.21	Q
8	4	Fabrice Coiffic	Mauritius	21.23	Q
9	1	Corne Du Plessis	South Africa	21.27	Q
10	3	Joseph Batangdon	Cameroon	21.28	Q
11	1	Adetoyi Durotoye	Nigeria	21.36	Q
12	4	Abdourahmane Ndour	Senegal	21.44	q
13	2	Fanuel Kenosi	Botswana	21.44	Q
14	6	Shepherd Agbeko	Ghana	21.54	Q
15	5	Christopher Gyapong	Ghana	21.59	Q
16	3	Moussa Sissoko	Mali	21.62	Q
17	2	Roger Angouono-Moke	Republic of the Congo	21.65	Q
18	5	Suwaibou Sanneh	Gambia	21.66	q
19	6	François Belinga	Cameroon	21.73	Q
20	2	Wetere Galcha	Ethiopia	21.74	Q
21	1	Béranger Aymard Bosse	Central African Republic	21.80	q
22	5	Bereket Desta	Ethiopia	21.81	q
23	6	Ogaweditse Museki	Botswana	21.86	q
24	2	Onyeabor Ngwogu	Nigeria	21.88	q
25	3	Isaac Jones	Gambia	21.96	
26	6	Abyot Lencho	Ethiopia	22.00	
27	5	Idrissa Adam	Cameroon	22.02	
28	4	Sergio Mullins	South Africa	22.05	
29	2	Narcisse Tevoedjre	Benin	22.10	
30	3	Dazi Conet Theodore Kouassi	Ivory Coast	22.37	
31	2	Marius Loua Siapade	Ivory Coast	22.42	
32	4	Moumi Sebergue	Chad	22.57	
33	1	Mounir Mahadi	Chad	22.58	
34	2	Islam Mulinda	Rwanda	22.65	
35	6	Ghyd-Kermeliss-Holly Olonghot	Republic of the Congo	22.69	
36	6	Mafo Tshiyinoa	Democratic Republic of the Congo	22.78	
37	2	Almamy Bangoura	Guinea	23.01	
38	5	Moussa Camara	Guinea	23.23	
	1	Muadam Hamisi	Tanzania	DNS	
	1	Oumar Loum	Senegal	DNS	
	1	Youssouf Mhadjou	Comoros	DNS	
	3	Wilfried Bingangoye	Gabon	DNS	
	3	Amr Ibrahim Mostafa Seoud	Egypt	DNS	
	3	Katim Touré	Senegal	DNS	
	4	Yasini Mihndini	Tanzania	DNS	
	5	Éric Pacôme N'Dri	Ivory Coast	DNS	
	6	Mussa Mlekwa	Tanzania	DNS	

=== Semifinals ===
Qualification: First 2 of each semifinal (Q) and the next 2 fastest (q) qualified for the final.

Wind: Heat 1: -5.5 m/s, Heat 2: +3.7 m/s, Heat 3: -3.6 m/s

Rank	Heat	Name	Nationality	Time	Notes
1	3	Thuso Mpuang	South Africa	20.97	Q
2	2	Stéphan Buckland	Mauritius	21.01	Q
3	2	Khalid Idrissi Zougari	Morocco	21.19	Q
4	3	Soleiman Salem Ayed	Egypt	21.21	Q
5	3	Hitjivirue Kaanjuka	Namibia	21.22	q
6	1	Obinna Metu	Nigeria	21.24	Q
7	1	Fanuel Kenosi	Botswana	21.39	Q
8	2	Joseph Batangdon	Cameroon	21.46	q
9	1	Seth Amoo	Ghana	21.46	
10	2	Corne Du Plessis	South Africa	21.48	
11	2	Christopher Gyapong	Ghana	21.48	
12	3	Shepherd Agbeko	Ghana	21.50	
13	2	Moussa Sissoko	Mali	21.66	
14	3	Adetoyi Durotoye	Nigeria	21.69	
15	1	Abdourahmane Ndour	Senegal	21.71	
16	1	Wetere Galcha	Ethiopia	21.83	
17	2	Bereket Desta	Ethiopia	21.84	
18	2	Béranger Aymard Bosse	Central African Republic	21.87	
19	1	Onyeabor Ngwogu	Nigeria	21.87	
20	3	François Belinga	Cameroon	22.14	
21	3	Ogaweditse Museki	Botswana	22.79	
	1	Fabrice Coiffic	Mauritius	DNF	
	1	Roger Angouono-Moke	Republic of the Congo	DNS	
	3	Suwaibou Sanneh	Gambia	DNS	

=== Final ===
Wind: +0.3 m/s

Rank	Lane	Name	Nationality	Time	Notes
1st place, gold medalist(s)	4	Thuso Mpuang	South Africa	20.53	PB
2nd place, silver medalist(s)	5	Stéphan Buckland	Mauritius	20.62	SB
3rd place, bronze medalist(s)	8	Fanuel Kenosi	Botswana	20.72	NR
4	6	Obinna Metu	Nigeria	20.73	
5	3	Khalid Idrissi Zougari	Morocco	20.82	
6	2	Joseph Batangdon	Cameroon	21.24	
7	1	Hitjivirue Kaanjuka	Namibia	21.28	
	7	Soleiman Salem Ayed	Egypt	DNF	
