= 2006 African Championships in Athletics – Men's 4 × 100 metres relay =

Track and field relay event in the 2006 African Championships in Athletics

The men's 4 × 100 metres relay event at the 2006 African Championships in Athletics was held at the Stade Germain Comarmond on August 11.

== Results ==
Rank	Lane	Nation	Competitors	Time	Notes
1st place, gold medalist(s)	4	Nigeria	Peter Emelieze,^{a} Uchenna Emedolu, Adetoyi Durotoye, Olusoji Fasuba	39.63	
2nd place, silver medalist(s)	6	South Africa	Hannes Dreyer, Leigh Julius, Lee Roy Newton, Sherwin Vries	39.68	
3rd place, bronze medalist(s)	5	Ghana	Harry Adu-Mfum, Cyril Ferguson, Seth Amoo, Eric Nkansah	40.12	
4	7	Senegal	Dieme Bakary, ?, Oumar Loum, Moussa Baldé	40.54	
5	8	Liberia	Bobby Young, Augustine Schmader, Anthony Whea, Cyrus Wesley	41.02	
6	3	Botswana	Obakeng Ngwigwa, Tlhalosang Molapisi, Mooketsi Magaga, Gable Garenamotse	41.20	
	2	Seychelles	Wallace Brutis, Travis Hardy, Stephen Moosoudee, Abdulla Mohamed Hussein	DQ	
	1	Mauritius	Arnaud Casquette, Eric Milazar, Fabrice Coiffic, Stéphan Buckland	DNF	
