= Seth Amoo =

Ghanaian sprinter (born 1983)

Medal record

Men's athletics

Representing Ghana

African Championships
Silver medal – second place	2008 Addis Ababa	4×100 m
Bronze medal – third place	2006 Bambous	4×100 m

Seth Amoo (born 20 March 1983) is a Ghanaian sprinter who specializes in the 200 metres.

Amoo represented Ghana at the 2008 Summer Olympics in Beijing. He competed at the 200 metres and placed fourth in his first round heat in a time of 20.91 seconds, which was not enough to qualify for the second round.

Amoo was an All-American sprinter for the Arizona State Sun Devils track and field team, finishing runner-up in the 4 × 100 metres relay at the 2004 NCAA Division I Outdoor Track and Field Championships and in the 4 × 400 metres relay at the 2005 NCAA Division I Outdoor Track and Field Championships.

== Competition record ==
Year	Competition	Venue	Position	Event	Notes
Representing Ghana
2006	African Championships	Bambous, Mauritius	7th	200 m	21.70
2006	African Championships	Bambous, Mauritius	2nd	4 × 100 m relay	40.12
2006	Commonwealth Games	Melbourne, Australia	25th (qf)	100 m	10.75
2006	Commonwealth Games	Melbourne, Australia	16th (sf)	200 m	21.19
2006	Commonwealth Games	Melbourne, Australia	4th (h)	4 × 100 m relay	39.03
2007	All-Africa Games	Algiers, Algeria	2nd	200 m	20.88
2007	All-Africa Games	Algiers, Algeria	4th	4 × 100 m relay	39.59
2007	World Championships	Osaka, Japan	30th (h)	200 m	20.85
2008	World Indoor Championships	Valencia, Spain	28th (h)	60 m	6.88
2008	African Championships	Addis Ababa, Ethiopia	9th (sf)	200 m	21.46
2008	African Championships	Addis Ababa, Ethiopia	2nd	4 × 100 m relay	40.30
2008	Olympic Games	Beijing, China	33rd (h)	200 m	20.91
2009	World Championships	Berlin, Germany	35th (h)	200 m	21.04
2009	World Championships	Berlin, Germany	13th (h)	4 × 100 m relay	39.61

=== Personal bests ===
- 60 metres - 6.70 s (2008)
- 100 metres - 10.30 s (2004)
- 200 metres - 20.36 s (2005)
- 400 metres - 46.08 s (2003)
