= 2006 African Championships in Athletics – Men's 200 metres =

The men's 200 metres event at the 2006 African Championships in Athletics was held at the Stade Germain Comarmond on August 12–13.

== Medalists ==
Gold	Silver	Bronze
Uchenna Emedolu; Nigeria	Stéphan Buckland; Mauritius	Leigh Julius; South Africa

== Results ==
=== Heats ===
Wind: Heat 1: -3.6 m/s, Heat 2: -3.5 m/s, Heat 3: -2.3 m/s, Heat 4: -2.2 m/s, Heat 5: -5.1 m/s

Rank	Heat	Name	Nationality	Time	Notes
1	4	Amr Ibrahim Mostafa Seoud	Egypt	21.07	Q
2	2	Stéphan Buckland	Mauritius	21.35	Q
3	4	Seth Amoo	Ghana	21.36	Q
4	3	Fabrice Coiffic	Mauritius	21.38	Q
5	3	Leigh Julius	South Africa	21.39	Q
6	1	Uchenna Emedolu	Nigeria	21.50	Q
7	4	Soleiman Salem Ayed	Egypt	21.54	q, SB
8	2	Oumar Loum	Senegal	21.57	Q
9	4	Marius Loua Siapade	Ivory Coast	21.61	q
10	2	Tanko Braimah	Ghana	21.62	q
10	4	Temba Ncube	Zimbabwe	21.62	q
12	1	Brian Dzingai	Zimbabwe	21.63	Q
13	4	Lee Roy Newton	South Africa	21.73	q
14	3	Mphelave Dlamin	Swaziland	21.99	q
15	1	Tidiane Coulibaly	Mali	22.02	
16	5	Sherwin Vries	South Africa	22.05	Q
17	3	Jack Ng'umbi	Zambia	22.07	
18	5	Vincent Mumo	Kenya	22.10	Q
19	1	Yves Sonan	Ivory Coast	22.13	
20	2	Islam Mulinda	Rwanda	22.18	
21	3	Wetere Galcha	Ethiopia	22.31	
22	4	Devilert Arsene Kimbembe	Republic of the Congo	22.35	
23	5	Gad Boakye	Ghana	22.45	
24	3	Mooketsi Magaga	Botswana	22.54	
25	4	Tshepang Tshube	Botswana	22.56	
26	1	Tlhalosang Molapisi	Botswana	22.74	
27	5	Richard Chitambi	Zambia	23.05	
28	5	Nelson Renaud	Seychelles	23.33	
29	2	Wallace Brutis	Seychelles	23.90	
	4	Assoumani Ahmed	Comoros	DNF	
	2	Adetoyi Durotoye	Nigeria	DQ	
	1	Abdourahmane Ndour	Senegal	DNS	
	2	Roger Angouono-Moke	Republic of the Congo	DNS	
	5	Abdula Maled	Somalia	DNS	
	5	Béranger Aymard Bosse	Central African Republic	DNS	

=== Semifinals ===
Wind: Heat 1: -1.1 m/s, Heat 2: -1.8 m/s

Rank	Heat	Name	Nationality	Time	Notes
1	2	Uchenna Emedolu	Nigeria	20.88	Q
2	1	Sherwin Vries	South Africa	20.90	Q
3	1	Stéphan Buckland	Mauritius	20.93	Q
4	1	Oumar Loum	Senegal	20.99	Q
5	1	Brian Dzingai	Zimbabwe	21.05	Q
6	2	Leigh Julius	South Africa	21.06	Q
7	1	Tanko Braimah	Ghana	21.15	
7	2	Fabrice Coiffic	Mauritius	21.15	Q
9	2	Seth Amoo	Ghana	21.23	Q
10	1	Amr Ibrahim Mostafa Seoud	Egypt	21.32	
10	2	Vincent Mumo	Kenya	21.32	
12	2	Lee Roy Newton	South Africa	21.38	
13	2	Temba Ncube	Zimbabwe	21.58	
14	1	Marius Loua Siapade	Ivory Coast	21.73	
14	2	Soleiman Salem Ayed	Egypt	21.73	
16	1	Mphelave Dlamin	Swaziland	22.09	

=== Final ===
Wind: -1.5 m/s

Rank	Lane	Name	Nationality	Time	Notes
1st place, gold medalist(s)	3	Uchenna Emedolu	Nigeria	20.61	
2nd place, silver medalist(s)	6	Stéphan Buckland	Mauritius	20.67	
3rd place, bronze medalist(s)	5	Leigh Julius	South Africa	20.82	
4	4	Sherwin Vries	South Africa	20.84	
5	7	Fabrice Coiffic	Mauritius	21.14	
6	2	Brian Dzingai	Zimbabwe	21.24	
7	8	Seth Amoo	Ghana	21.70	
	1	Oumar Loum	Senegal	DNS	
