= 2007 World Championships in Athletics – Men's 200 metres =

Men's 200 metres at the 2007 World Championships
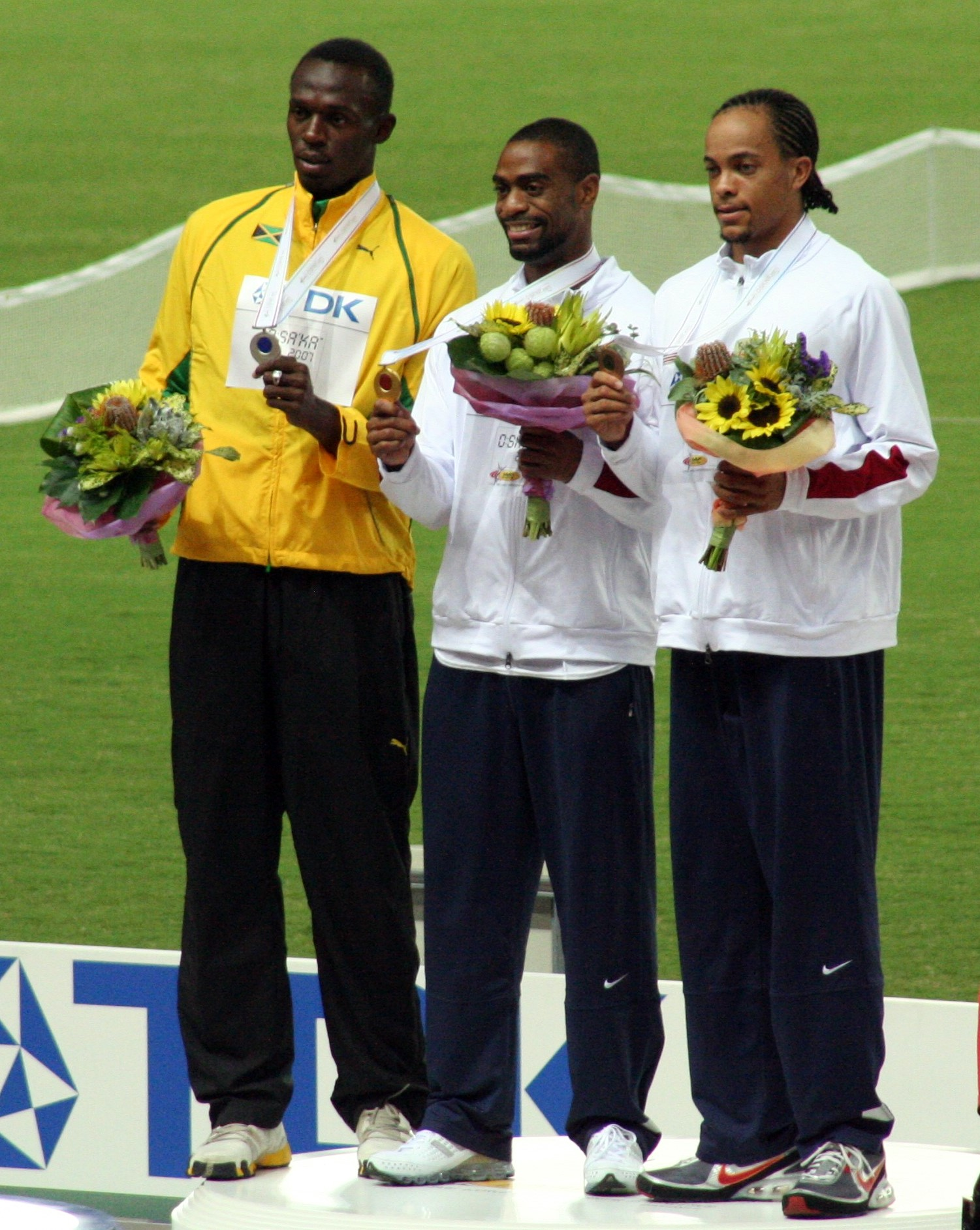
- World Champion Tyson Gay (center) receiving his gold medal alongside silver medalist Usain Bolt (left) and bronze medalist Wallace Spearmon (right).
- Venue: Osaka Nagai Stadium
- Dates: 28 August (heats and quarter-finals); 29 August (semi-finals); 30 August (final)
- Competitors: 49
- Winning time: 19.76

Medalists
gold medal	Tyson Gay	United States
silver medal	Usain Bolt	Jamaica
bronze medal	Wallace Spearmon	United States

These are the official results of the men's 200 metres event at the 2007 IAAF World Championships in Osaka, Japan. There were a total number of 49 participating athletes, with six qualifying heats and the final held on Thursday August 30. This event is notable for being one of the two solo World Championship events in which Usain Bolt has been beaten as of July 2017, the other event being men's 200 metres in 2005 World Championships.

The winning margin for the final was 0.15 seconds.

== Medalists ==
Gold	Silver	Bronze
Tyson Gay; United States	Usain Bolt; Jamaica	Wallace Spearmon; United States

== Records ==
Existing records at the start of the event.

World Record	Michael Johnson (USA)	19.32	Atlanta, United States	August 1, 1996
Championship Record	Michael Johnson (USA)	19.79	Gothenburg, Sweden	August 11, 1995

== Schedule ==
Date	Time	Round
August 28, 2007	11:10	Heats
August 28, 2007	20:10	Quarterfinals
August 29, 2007	22:20	Semifinals
August 30, 2007	22:20	Final

== Results ==
KEY:	q	Fastest non-qualifiers	Q	Qualified	WR	World record	AR	Area record	NR	National record	PB	Personal best	SB	Seasonal best

=== Heats ===
Qualification: First 4 in each heat(Q) and the next 8 fastest(q) advance to the quarterfinals.

Rank	Heat	Name	Nationality	Time	Notes
1	4	Anastasios Gousis	Greece	20.11	Q, PB
2	4	Usain Bolt	Jamaica	20.12	Q
3	4	Brendan Christian	Antigua and Barbuda	20.23	Q, NR
4	3	Bryan Barnett	Canada	20.31	Q, PB
4	4	Marcin Jędrusiński	Poland	20.31	Q, PB
6	6	Marvin Anderson	Jamaica	20.43	Q
7	5	Rodney Martin	United States	20.44	Q
7	6	Kristof Beyens	Belgium	20.44	Q, PB
9	6	Wallace Spearmon	United States	20.45	Q
10	2	Tyson Gay	United States	20.46	Q
10	5	Paul Hession	Ireland	20.46	Q
12	2	Churandy Martina	Netherlands Antilles	20.47	Q
12	2	Sandro Viana	Brazil	20.47	Q
12	3	Shingo Suetsugu	Japan	20.47	Q
15	3	Patrick Johnson	Australia	20.48	Q, SB
15	4	Arnaldo Abrantes	Portugal	20.48	Q, PB
17	3	Brian Dzingai	Zimbabwe	20.50	Q
18	2	Matic Osovnikar	Slovenia	20.51	Q, SB
19	2	Visa Hongisto	Finland	20.56	q, PB
20	3	Guus Hoogmoed	Netherlands	20.57	q
21	6	Francis Obikwelu	Portugal	20.61	Q
22	2	James Dolphin	New Zealand	20.65	q, SB
22	6	Amr Ibrahim Mostafa Seoud	Egypt	20.65	q, NR
24	2	Marco Cribari	Switzerland	20.71	q
25	5	Marc Schneeberger	Switzerland	20.72	Q
26	5	Tomoya Kamiyama	Japan	20.78	Q
27	4	Jacobi Mitchell	Bahamas	20.81	q
28	4	Ivan Teplykh	Russia	20.81	q, SB
29	1	Shinji Takahira	Japan	20.83	Q
30	3	Seth Amoo	Ghana	20.85	
30	5	Christian Krone	South Africa	20.85	
32	1	Christopher Williams	Jamaica	20.88	Q
33	5	Khalil Al Hanahneh	Jordan	21.01	NR
34	1	Basílio de Moraes	Brazil	21.09	Q
35	6	Hitjivirue Kaanjuka	Namibia	21.10	
36	6	Daniel Grueso	Colombia	21.11	
37	1	Franklin Nazareno	Ecuador	21.18	Q
38	1	Juan Pedro Toledo	Mexico	21.31	
39	1	Ruslan Abbasov	Azerbaijan	21.33	
40	1	Morné Nagel	South Africa	21.35	
41	3	Tang Yik Chun	Hong Kong	21.72	
42	3	Sittichai Suwonprateep	Thailand	21.87	SB
43	2	Mphelave Dlamin	Swaziland	21.96	SB
44	5	Courtny Bascombe	Saint Vincent and the Grenadines	22.08	PB
45	4	Michael Alicto	Guam	22.45	PB
46	6	Zahir Naseer	Maldives	23.27	PB
47	2	Amaroy Marino	Palau	23.34	PB
48	1	Harmon Harmon	Cook Islands	23.78	
49	5	Marek Niit	Estonia		DNS

=== Quarterfinals ===
Qualification: First 4 in each heat(Q) advance to the semifinals.

Rank	Heat	Name	Nationality	Time	Notes
1	3	Tyson Gay	United States	20.08	Q
2	2	Usain Bolt	Jamaica	20.13	Q
2	3	Marvin Anderson	Jamaica	20.13	Q, PB
4	1	Rodney Martin	United States	20.25	Q
5	2	Wallace Spearmon	United States	20.26	Q
6	1	Brian Dzingai	Zimbabwe	20.28	Q, SB
7	1	Brendan Christian	Antigua and Barbuda	20.36	Q
8	3	Francis Obikwelu	Portugal	20.38	Q, SB
9	2	Churandy Martina	Netherlands Antilles	20.39	Q
10	1	Christopher Williams	Jamaica	20.40	Q
11	2	Bryan Barnett	Canada	20.41	Q
12	4	Paul Hession	Ireland	20.50	Q
13	4	Anastasios Gousis	Greece	20.51	Q
14	4	Kristof Beyens	Belgium	20.52	Q
15	3	Marcin Jędrusiński	Poland	20.53	Q
16	4	Patrick Johnson	Australia	20.62	Q
17	1	Matic Osovnikar	Slovenia	20.65	
18	3	Sandro Viana	Brazil	20.68	
19	3	Shingo Suetsugu	Japan	20.70	
20	1	Amr Ibrahim Mostafa Seoud	Egypt	20.72	
21	1	Shinji Takahira	Japan	20.77	
22	2	Visa Hongisto	Finland	20.78	
23	1	James Dolphin	New Zealand	20.80	
24	4	Arnaldo Abrantes	Portugal	20.82	
25	3	Marco Cribari	Switzerland	20.86	
26	2	Tomoya Kamiyama	Japan	20.89	
27	4	Ivan Teplykh	Russia	20.98	
28	2	Basílio de Moraes	Brazil	21.07	
29	4	Marc Schneeberger	Switzerland	21.09	
30	2	Jacobi Mitchell	Bahamas	21.17	
31	3	Guus Hoogmoed	Netherlands	21.32	
32	4	Franklin Nazareno	Ecuador	21.50	

=== Semifinals ===
First 4 of each Semifinal will be directly qualified (Q) for the final.

==== Semifinal 1 ====
Rank	Lane	Name	Nationality	React	Time	Notes
1	6	Usain Bolt	Jamaica	0.169	20.03	Q
2	7	Wallace Spearmon	United States	0.133	20.05	Q
3	4	Rodney Martin	United States	0.165	20.18	Q, SB
4	3	Churandy Martina	Netherlands Antilles	0.140	20.20	Q, NR
5	8	Francis Obikwelu	Portugal	0.167	20.40	
6	5	Brian Dzingai	Zimbabwe	0.125	20.45	
7	9	Marcin Jędrusiński	Poland	0.151	20.54	
8	2	Bryan Barnett	Canada	0.142	20.68	

==== Semifinal 2 ====
Rank	Lane	Name	Nationality	React	Time	Notes
1	5	Tyson Gay	United States	0.157	20.00	Q
2	6	Marvin Anderson	Jamaica	0.163	20.06	Q, PB
3	9	Christopher Williams	Jamaica	0.143	20.24	Q
4	7	Anastasios Gousis	Greece	0.151	20.33	Q
5	3	Brendan Christian	Antigua and Barbuda	0.139	20.36	
6	4	Paul Hession	Ireland	0.154	20.50	
7	8	Kristof Beyens	Belgium	0.152	20.53	
8	2	Patrick Johnson	Australia	0.151	20.73	

=== Final ===
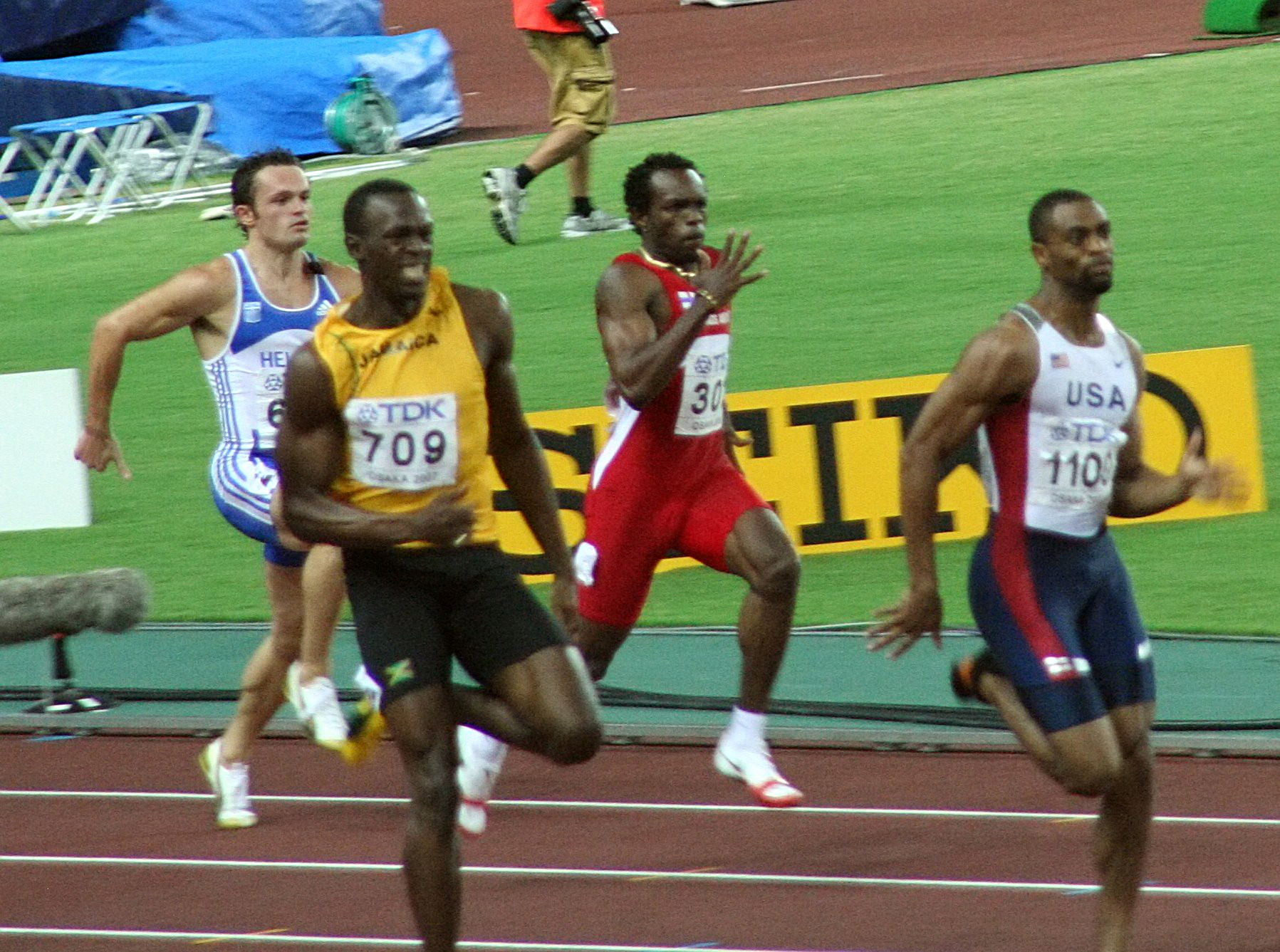
Tyson Gay pulling away in the closing stages of the race

Rank	Lane	Name	Nationality	React	Time	Notes
1st place, gold medalist(s)	4	Tyson Gay	United States	0.143	19.76	CR
2nd place, silver medalist(s)	5	Usain Bolt	Jamaica	0.159	19.91	
3rd place, bronze medalist(s)	6	Wallace Spearmon	United States	0.144	20.05	
4	8	Rodney Martin	United States	0.186	20.06	PB
5	3	Churandy Martina	Netherlands Antilles	0.144	20.28	
6	7	Marvin Anderson	Jamaica	0.171	20.28	
7	9	Christopher Williams	Jamaica	0.154	20.57	
8	2	Anastasios Gousis	Greece	0.143	20.75	
