= 2003 European Athletics U23 Championships – Men's 200 metres =

The men's 200 metres event at the 2003 European Athletics U23 Championships was held in Bydgoszcz, Poland, at Zawisza Stadion on 18 and 20 July.

== Medalists ==
Gold	Chris Lambert; Great Britain
Silver	Marcin Jędrusiński; Poland
Bronze	Johan Wissman; Sweden

== Results ==
=== Final ===
20 July
Wind: 0.7 m/s

Rank	Name	Nationality	Time	Notes
1st place, gold medalist(s)	Chris Lambert	Great Britain	20.34	CR
2nd place, silver medalist(s)	Marcin Jędrusiński	Poland	20.39	
3rd place, bronze medalist(s)	Johan Wissman	Sweden	20.43	
4	Johan Engberg	Sweden	20.83	
5	Paul Hession	Ireland	20.86	
6	Jiří Vojtík	Czech Republic	20.91	
7	Kristof Beyens	Belgium	20.91	
8	Guus Hoogmoed	Netherlands	20.98	

=== Heats ===
18 July
Qualified: first 2 in each heat and 2 best to the Final

==== Heat 1 ====
Wind: 2.2 m/s

Rank	Name	Nationality	Time	Notes
1	Chris Lambert	Great Britain	20.75 w	Q
2	Paul Hession	Ireland	20.88 w	Q
3	Guus Hoogmoed	Netherlands	20.90 w	q
4	Ricardo Alves	Portugal	21.19 w	
5	Tal Mor	Israel	21.26 w	
6	Neophytos Michael	Cyprus	21.40 w	
7	Paweł Ptak	Poland	21.51 w	

==== Heat 2 ====
Wind: 0.3 m/s

Rank	Name	Nationality	Time	Notes
1	Johan Wissman	Sweden	20.72	Q
2	Jiří Vojtík	Czech Republic	20.87	Q
3	Kristof Beyens	Belgium	20.94	q
4	Tim Abeyie	Great Britain	21.24	
5	Daniel Abenzoar-Foulé	Luxembourg	21.47	
6	David Socrier	France	21.53	
7	José María García-Borreguero	Spain	21.61	

==== Heat 3 ====
Wind: 1.2 m/s

Rank	Name	Nationality	Time	Notes
1	Marcin Jędrusiński	Poland	20.90	Q
2	Johan Engberg	Sweden	21.22	Q
3	Daniel Adolia	France	21.40	
4	Adrian Stefan	Romania	21.42	
5	Markus Malucha	Germany	21.52	
6	Dániel Ágoston	Hungary	21.59	
7	Dmitriy Chumichkin	Azerbaijan	22.02	

== Participation ==
According to an unofficial count, 21 athletes from 17 countries participated in the event.

- Azerbaijan (1)
- Belgium (1)
- Cyprus (1)
- Czech Republic (1)
- France (2)
- Germany (1)
- Great Britain (2)
- Hungary (1)
- Ireland (1)
- Israel (1)
- Luxembourg (1)
- Netherlands (1)
- Poland (2)
- Portugal (1)
- Romania (1)
- Spain (1)
- Sweden (2)
