= Leigh Julius =

South African sprinter

Medal record

Men's athletics

Representing South Africa

African Championships
Silver medal – second place	2006 Bambous	4×100 m
Bronze medal – third place	2006 Bambous	200 m

Leigh Ignatius Julius (born 25 March 1985) is a South African sprinter.

Julius was born in Cradock, Eastern Cape, He represented South Africa at the 2008 Summer Olympics in Beijing. He competed at the 4 × 100 metres relay together with Hannes Dreyer, Ishmael Kumbane and Thuso Mpuang. In their qualification heat they did not finish due to a mistake in the baton exchange and they were eliminated.

== Competition record ==
Year	Competition	Venue	Position	Event	Notes
Representing South Africa
2001	World Youth Championships	Debrecen, Hungary	2nd	Medley reley	1:51.35
2002	World Junior Championships	Kingston, Jamaica	21st (sf)	200 m	21.83 (-4.1 m/s)
2002	World Junior Championships	Kingston, Jamaica	6th (h)	4 × 400 m relay	3:07.65
2002	Commonwealth Games	Manchester, United Kingdom	3rd (h)	4 × 400 m relay	3:04.31
2003	Universiade	Daegu, South Korea	2nd	100 m	10.50
2003	Universiade	Daegu, South Korea	1st	200 m	20.49
2004	World Junior Championships	Grosseto, Italy	14th (sf)	100 m	10.56 (+0.3 m/s)
2004	World Junior Championships	Grosseto, Italy	2nd	200 m	20.88 (+0.1 m/s)
2004	World Junior Championships	Grosseto, Italy	2nd	4 × 400 m relay	3:04.50
2004	Olympic Games	Athens, Greece	32nd (h)	200 m	20.80
2005	World Championships	Helsinki, Finland	36th (h)	100 m	10.51
2005	World Championships	Helsinki, Finland	24th (qf)	200 m	21.45
2005	Universiade	İzmir, Turkey	1st	200 m	20.56
2005	Universiade	İzmir, Turkey	9th (h)	4 × 100 m relay	40.42
2006	Commonwealth Games	Melbourne, Australia	10th (sf)	200 m	20.86
2006	Commonwealth Games	Melbourne, Australia	2nd	4 × 100 m relay	38.98
2006	African Championships	Bambous, Mauritius	3rd	200 m	20.82
2006	African Championships	Bambous, Mauritius	2nd	4 × 100 m relay	39.68
2007	Universiade	Bangkok, Thailand	2nd	200 m	20.96
2007	Universiade	Bangkok, Thailand	2nd	4 × 100 m relay	39.20
2007	All-Africa Games	Algiers, Algeria	1st	200 m	20.81
2007	All-Africa Games	Algiers, Algeria	2nd	4 × 100 m relay	39.11
2007	World Championships	Osaka, Japan	11th (h)	4 × 100 m relay	39.05
2009	Universiade	Belgrade, Serbia	19th (qf)	200 m	39.52
2009	Universiade	Belgrade, Serbia	3rd	4 × 100 m relay	39.52
2009	World Championships	Berlin, Germany	14th (h)	4 × 100 m relay	39.71

=== Personal bests ===
- 100 metres – 10.25 s (2007)
- 200 metres – 20.42 s (2010)
- 400 metres – 46.59 s (2004)
