= Snyman Prinsloo =

South African athletics competitor

Personal information
- Born: 22 May 1984 (age 42)

Sport
- Country: South Africa
- Sport: Athletics
- Event: Sprinting
Medal record
Commonwealth Games
Silver medal – second place	2006 Melbourne	4 × 100 m relay
Universiade
Silver medal – second place	2007 Bangkok	4 × 100 m relay

Snyman Prinsloo (born 22 May 1984) is a South African former athlete.

A sprinter, Prinsloo had personal bests of 10.32 seconds for the 100 metres and 20.70 seconds for the 200 metres. He was a member of South Africa's silver medal-winning 4 × 100 metres team at the 2006 Commonwealth Games in Melbourne and also ran in the relay at 2007 World Championships. At the 2007 All-Africa Games in Algiers, Prinsloo came fifth in the individual 100 metres final with a time of 10.39 seconds, putting him .02 seconds off the podium.

Prinsloo married heptathlete Mariska Meintjies.
