= Rene Oruman =

Estonian athletics competitor

Rene Oruman (born 7 January 1984) is an Estonian athletics competitor.

He was born in Pärnu. In 2002 he graduated from Audentes Sports Gymnasium in Tallinn, and in 2005 from the University of Tartu's Institute of Physical Education.

He started his athletics exercising under the guidance of Ando Palginõmm. 2005-2008 his coach was Tiina Torop. He won gold medal at 2001 World Youth Championships in Athletics, competing in octathlon. He is multiple-times Estonian champion in different running disciplines.

Records:

- 110 m hurdles 13,88 (2007)
- 60 m hurdles 7,84 (2008)
