= Athletics at the 2015 SEA Games =

International athletics championship event

- Venue: National Stadium; East Coast Park; Kallang Practice Track
- Date: 6–12 June 2015
- Competitors: 346 from 11 nations

Athletics competitions at the 2015 SEA Games were held at the National Stadium, East Coast Park and Kallang Practice Track in Singapore from 6 to 12 June. A total of 46 athletics events are featured at the 28th SEA Games, divided evenly between the sexes. The marathon started and finished in the stadium and had a route in the surrounding area including the East Coast Park, Marina Bay and the Gardens by the Bay.

A total of eleven games records were broken at the competition. Further to this, 42 national record marks were equalled or bettered and three regional bests for Southeast Asia were set. The regional records included 5.30 m in the men's pole vault by Porranot Purahong and 16.76 m in the men's triple jump by Muhammad Hakimi Ismail.

Thailand maintained its long streak at the top of the athletics medal table, winning seventeen events and ending the competition with 39 medals. Vietnam was the runner-up with eleven gold medals among its haul of 34 medals. (Thailand was most successful in the field events, while Vietnam won most of its medals on the track.) Indonesia won the next highest number of gold medals at seven, while the Philippines had the third highest medal total with 21. The host nation Singapore won three gold medals. Seven of the eleven participating nations reached the medal table.

Two Filipinos, Eric Cray and Kayla Richardson, won the men's and women's 100 metres, and a third, Caleb Stuart, won the men's hammer throw. Cray completed a double, defending his 400 m hurdles title as well and being one of seven athletes to win two individual gold medals at the games. Two Indonesian women had doubles: Maria Natalia Londa won both the women's long jump and triple jump titles, while reigning 10,000 m champion Triyaningsih won over that distance and also the 5000 m (the fourth time in her career she had won that double). The remaining three doubles were achieved by Vietnamese athletes: Nguyễn Thị Huyền won the 400 m flat and hurdles, while Dương Văn Thái and Đỗ Thị Thảo won all the men's and women's middle-distance titles between them.

A total of seventeen athletes defended their titles from the 2013 SEA Games, with both Đỗ Thị Thảo and Maria Natalia Londa completing the same doubles they had previously. Zhang Guirong had her sixth straight win in the women's shot put, while Triyaningsih extended her unbeaten run in the 10,000 m to five. Jamras Rittidet took his fourth consecutive SEA Games gold medal in the men's 110 m hurdles. Three women had their third straight SEA Games wins: Rini Budiarti (steeplechase), Nguyễn Thị Thanh Phúc (20 km walk) and Subenrat Insaeng (discus).

== Competition schedule ==
The following was the competition schedule for the athletics competitions:

== Records ==
A total of eleven games records were improved at the competition.

=== Men ===
Event	Date	Round	Name	Nationality	Result	Type
100 m	9 June	Final	Eric Shauwn Cray	Philippines	10.25	NR
400 m	12 June	Final	Kunanon Sukkaew	Thailand	46.00	GR
5000 m	9 June	Final	Nguyễn Văn Lai	Vietnam	14:04.82	GR
110 m hurdles	11 June	Final	Jamras Rittidet	Thailand	13.69	GR
400 m hurdles	10 June	Final	Eric Shauwn Cray	Philippines	49.40	GR, NR
Pole vault	9 June	Final	Porranot Purahong	Thailand	5.30	GR
Triple jump	9 June	Final	Muhammad Hakimi Ismail	Malaysia	16.76	GR
Hammer throw	9 June	Final	Caleb John Christian Stuart	Philippines	65.63	GR

=== Women ===
Event	Date	Round	Name	Nationality	Result	Type
400 m hurdles	10 June	Final	Nguyễn Thị Huyền	Vietnam	56.15	GR
3000 m steeplechase	12 June	Final	Khin Mar Se	Myanmar	10:52.75	NR
3000 m steeplechase	12 June	Final	Cheryl Chan Xue Rou	Singapore	11:45.16	NR
Discus throw	12 June	Final	Subenrat Insaeng	Thailand	58.56	GR
Hammer throw	9 June	Final	Mingkamon Koomphon	Thailand	56.57	GR
4 × 400 m relay	11 June	Final	Nguyễn Thị Oanh; Nguyễn Thị Thủy; Quách Thị Lan; Nguyễn Thị Huyền	Vietnam	3:31.46	GR

== Medalists ==
Key
GR	Southeast Asian Games record	NR	National record

=== Men's events ===
Event	Gold		Silver		Bronze	
100 m	Eric Cray; Philippines	10.25	Yaspi Boby; Indonesia	10.45	Iswandi; Indonesia	10.45
200 m	Lê Trọng Hinh; Vietnam	20.89	Jaran Sathoengram; Thailand	21.05	Jirapong Meenapra; Thailand	21.13
400 m	Kunanon Sukkaew; Thailand	46.00 GR	Quách Công Lịch; Vietnam	46.02	Edgardo Alejan Jr. Philippines	47.08
800 m	Dương Văn Thái; Vietnam	1:51.43	Mervin Guarte; Philippines	1:51.47	Yothin Yaprajan; Thailand	1:52.32
1500 m	Dương Văn Thái; Vietnam	3:47.04	Mervin Guarte; Philippines	3:48.06	Yothin Yaprajan; Thailand	3:49.35
5000 m	Nguyễn Văn Lai; Vietnam	14:04.82 GR	Agus Prayogo; Indonesia	14:15.14	Sanchai Namkhet; Thailand	14:40.59
10000 m	Agus Prayogo; Indonesia	29:41.56	Boonthung Srisung; Thailand	30:05.22	San Naing; Myanmar	30:26.23
110 m hurdles	Jamras Rittidet; Thailand	13.69 GR	Rayzam Shah Wan Sofian; Malaysia	13.97	Patrick Unso; Philippines	14.12
400 m hurdles	Eric Cray; Philippines	49.40 GR	Quách Công Lịch; Vietnam	50.29	Andrian; Indonesia	51.36
3000 m steeplechase	Christopher Ulboc Jr. Philippines	8:59.07	Phạm Tiến Sản; Vietnam	8:59.90	Atjong Tio Purwanto; Indonesia	9:06.41
4 × 100 m relay	Thailand; Ruttanapon Sowan; Aphisit Promkaew; Jirapong Meenapra; Jaran Sathoengram	38.99	Singapore; Calvin Kang Li Loong; Gary Yeo; Lee Cheng Wei; Muhammad Amirudin Jamal	39.24 NR	Indonesia; Fadlin; Iswandi; Yudi Dwi Nugroho; Yaspi Boby	39.32 NR
4 × 400 m relay	Thailand; Pooriphat Kaijun; Srikharin Wannasa; Saharat Sammayan; Kunanon Sukkaew	3:06.81	Philippines; Joan Caido; Edgardo Alejan Jr. Ryan Bigyan; Archand Christian Bagsit	3:06.84	Vietnam; Đào Xuân Cường; Lương Văn Thao; Lê Trọng Hinh; Quách Công Lịch	3:08.48
Marathon	Soh Rui Yong; Singapore	2:34:56	Boonthung Srisung; Thailand	2:35:09	Hoàng Nguyên Thanh; Vietnam	2:37:10
20 km walk	Hendro Yap; Indonesia	1:34:23	Võ Xuân Vinh; Vietnam	1:38:38	Md Khairil Harith Harun; Malaysia	1:40:57
High jump	Nauraj Singh Randhawa; Malaysia	2.13 m	Đào Văn Thủy; Vietnam	2.13 m	Muhammed Ashraf Saipu Rahman; Malaysia	2.11 m
Pole vault	Porranot Purahong; Thailand	5.30 m GR	Ernest John Obiena; Philippines	5.25 m	Iskandar Alwi; Malaysia	5.05 m
Long jump	Supanara Sukhasvasti; Thailand	7.75 m	Phạm Văn Lâm; Vietnam	7.52 m	Donovant Arriola Jr. Philippines	7.51 m
Triple jump	Hakimi Ismail; Malaysia	16.76 m GR	Varunyoo Kongnil; Thailand	16.20 m	Nguyễn Văn Hùng; Vietnam	15.92 m
Shot put	Promrob Juntima; Thailand	17.47 m	Chatchawal Polyiam; Thailand	17.05 m	Adi Aliffudin Hussin; Malaysia	16.96 m
Discus throw	Irfan Shamshuddin; Malaysia	56.62 m	Narong Benjaroon; Thailand	52.59 m	Kwanchai Numsomboon; Thailand	51.02 m
Hammer throw	Caleb John Stuart; Philippines	65.63 m GR	Tantipong Phetchaiya; Thailand	62.12 m	Jackie Wong Siew Cheer; Malaysia	61.18 m
Javelin throw	Peerachet Jantra; Thailand	75.18 m	Hussadin Rodmanee; Thailand	70.96 m	Kyaw Nyi Nyi Htwe; Myanmar	56.84 m
Decathlon	Nguyễn Văn Huê; Vietnam	7232 pts	Jesson Ramil Cid; Philippines	7065 pts	Janry Ubas; Philippines	6796 pts

=== Women's events ===
Event	Gold		Silver		Bronze	
100 m (Wind: -0.4 m/s)	Kayla Anise Richardson; Philippines	11.76	Tassaporn Wannakit; Thailand	11.76	Veronica Shanti Pereira; Singapore	11.88
200 m	Veronica Shanti Pereira; Singapore	23.60	Kayla Anise Richardson; Philippines	23.71	Nguyễn Thị Oanh; Vietnam	23.92
400 m	Nguyễn Thị Huyền; Vietnam	52.00	Quách Thị Lan; Vietnam	52.52	Shereen Samson Vallabouy; Malaysia	54.26
800 m	Đỗ Thị Thảo; Vietnam	2:05.22	Myint Swe Li; Myanmar	2:10.21	Vũ Thị Ly; Vietnam	2:12.36
1500 m	Đỗ Thị Thảo; Vietnam	4:28.39	Nguyen Thi Phuong; Vietnam	4:31.59	Phyu War Thet; Myanmar	4:33.25
5000 m	Triyaningsih; Indonesia	16:18.06	Rini Budiarti; Indonesia	16:30.85	Phyu War Thet; Myanmar	16:54.71
10000 m	Triyaningsih; Indonesia	33:44.53	Phạm Thị Huệ; Vietnam	35:02.70	Jane Vongvorachoti; Thailand	35:20.46
100 m hurdles (Wind: +0.2 m/s)	Wallapa Punsoongneun; Thailand	13.56	Dedeh Erawati; Indonesia	13.61	Trần Thị Yến Hoa; Vietnam	13.64
400 m hurdles	Nguyễn Thị Huyền; Vietnam	56.15 GR	Dipna Lim Prasad; Singapore	59.24	Wassana Winatho; Thailand	1:01.69
3000 m steeplechase	Rini Budiarti; Indonesia	10:20.40	Nguyễn Thị Phương; Vietnam	10:32.61	Jessica Lynn Barnard; Philippines	10:36.90
4 × 100 m relay	Thailand; Thipat Supawan; Khanrutai Pakdee; Phatsorn Jaksuninkorn; Tassaporn Wannakit	44.27	Vietnam; Ha Thi Thu; Lưu Kim Phụng; Trần Thị Yến Hoa; Quyền Đô Thị	44.77 NR=	Malaysia; Siti Fatima Mohamad; Zaidatul Husniah Zulkifli; Komalam Shally Selvaretnam; Noor Amira Mohamad Nafiah	45.41
4 × 400 m relay	Vietnam; Nguyễn Thị Oanh; Nguyễn Thị Thủy; Quách Thị Lan; Nguyễn Thị Huyền	3:31.46 GR	Thailand; Supanich Poolkerd; Atchima Eng-Chuan; Pornpan Hoemhuk; Treewadee Yongphan	3:36.82	Malaysia; Fathin Faqihah Mohd Yusuf; Nurul Faizah Asma Mazlan; Zaimah Atifah Zainuddin; Shereen Samson Vallabouy	3:39.10
Marathon	Natthaya Thanaronnawat; Thailand	3:03:25	Mary Joy Tabal; Philippines	3:04:39	Hoàng Thị Thanh; Vietnam	3:07:14
20 km walk	Nguyễn Thị Thanh Phúc; Vietnam	1:45:20	Soe Than Than; Myanmar	1:46:57	Phan Thị Bích Hà; Vietnam	1:48:23
High jump	Wanida Boonwan; Thailand	1.85 m	Phạm Thị Diễm; Vietnam	1.83 m	Michelle Sng Suat Li; Singapore	1.81 m
Pole vault	Chayanisa Chomchuendee; Thailand	4.10 m	Rachel Yang; Singapore	3.90 m	Riezel Buenaventura; Philippines	3.60 m
Long jump	Maria Natalia Londa; Indonesia	6.70 m	Bùi Thị Thu Thảo; Vietnam	6.65 m	Marestella Torres; Philippines	6.41 m
Triple jump	Maria Natalia Londa; Indonesia	13.75 m	Trần Huệ Hoa; Vietnam	13.73 m	Thitima Muangjan; Thailand	13.65 m
Shot put	Zhang Guirong; Singapore	14.60 m	Sawitri Thongchao; Thailand	13.62 m	Areerat Intadis; Thailand	13.31 m
Discus throw	Subenrat Insaeng; Thailand	59.56 m GR	Yap Jeng Tzan; Malaysia	46.95 m	Hannah Lee; Singapore	45.72 m
Hammer throw	Mingkamon Koomphon; Thailand	56.57 m GR	Panwat Gimsrang; Thailand	55.47 m	Grace Wong Xiu Mei; Malaysia	53.80 m
Javelin throw	Natta Nachan; Thailand	54.38 m	Bùi Thị Xuân; Vietnam	49.16 m	Rosie Villarito; Philippines	48.44 m
Heptathlon	Sunisa Khotseemueang; Thailand	5396 pts	Kotchakorn Khamrueangsri; Thailand	5280 pts	Narcisa Atienza; Philippines	4798 pts

== Medal table ==
Thailand topped the medal table with seventeen gold medals and a total of 39 medals.

* Host nation (Singapore)

Rank	Nation	Gold	Silver	Bronze	Total
1	Thailand (THA)	17	13	9	39
2	Vietnam (VIE)	11	15	8	34
3	Indonesia (INA)	7	4	4	15
4	Philippines (PHI)	5	7	9	21
5	Singapore (SIN)*	3	3	3	9
6	Malaysia (MAS)	3	2	9	14
7	Myanmar (MYA)	0	2	4	6
Totals (7 entries)		46	46	46	138

== See also ==
- Athletics at the 2015 ASEAN Para Games

== Participating nations ==
A total of 346 athletes (195 men, 151 women) from 11 nations competed in athletics at the 2015 Southeast Asian Games:

- Brunei (6)
- Cambodia (5)
- Indonesia (23)
- Laos (13)
- Malaysia (38)
- Myanmar (21)
- Philippines (36)
- Singapore (74)
- Thailand (77)
- Timor-Leste (5)
- Vietnam (48)
