= Athletics at the 2011 SEA Games =

International athletics championship event

- Venue: Jakabaring Athletic Stadium
- Location: Palembang, Indonesia
- Date: 12–16 November 2011
- Nations: 11

The athletics competition at the 2011 SEA Games was held from 12 to 16 November at the Jakabaring Athletic Stadium in Jakabaring Sport City, Palembang, Indonesia. Over the five-day competition a total of 46 events were contested with 23 contests for each gender, matching the Olympic athletics program minus the men's 50 km race walk. Six SEA Games records were broken and twenty national records were surpassed.

Thailand – traditionally dominant in the competition – again had the highest number of gold medals in athletics, winning fourteen events and taking 32 medals overall. The host nation Indonesia was a close second with thirteen golds and won the most medals with a total of 36. Vietnam were a clear third with nine golds and 32 medals. Seven of the eleven competing nations reached the medal table.

The 26th edition saw athletes continue successful streaks at the competition: Filipino Rene Herrera won his fifth consecutive men's steeplechase gold medal, his teammate Marestella Torres won her fourth long jump title (with the second longest jump in Asia so far in 2011), and Theerayut Philakong of Thailand won a fourth straight title in the men's triple jump. Thai athlete Wassana Winatho and James Wong Tuck Yim of Singapore each won their tenth SEA Games gold medals of their careers at the competition.

Indonesia's Triyaningsih demonstrated her regional dominance in women's long-distance running: after two 5000/10,000 m doubles in 2007 and 2009, she again won both track events and also the women's marathon race. Agus Prayogo won a 5000/10,000 m men's double and Yahuza's win in the men's marathon made it a long-distance sweep for Indonesia. Two other athletes completed event doubles: Franklin Burumi of Indonesia won the 100 and 200 metres finals, while Truong Thanh Hang repeated her 800/1500 metres double for a third consecutive edition.

The final runner on Malaysia's 4×400 m relay team, Muhamad Yunus Lasaleh, tested positive for banned substances at the competition.

== Medal summary ==
=== Men ===
Event	Gold		Silver		Bronze	
100 metres (Wind: +2.1 m/s)	Franklin Ramses Burumi; Indonesia	10.37 w	Gary Yeo; Singapore	10.46 w	Wachara Sondee; Thailand	10.47 w
200 metres	Franklin Ramses Burumi; Indonesia	20.93	Suppachai Chimdee; Thailand	21.05	Sompote Suwannarangsri; Thailand	21.46
400 metres	Heru Astriyanto; Indonesia	47.53	Archand Christian Bagsit; Philippines	47.71	Yakobus Leuwol; Indonesia	47.97
800 metres	Dương Văn Thái; Vietnam	1:49.42 NR	Mervin Guarte; Philippines	1:50.69	Abdul Haris; Indonesia	1:51.28
1500 metres	Ridwan; Indonesia	3:47.63	Mervin Guarte; Philippines	3:47.65 NR	Nguyễn Đình Cương; Vietnam	3:49.48 ^{†}
5000 metres	Agus Prayogo; Indonesia	14:10.01	Jauhari Johan; Indonesia	14:35.98	Nguyễn Văn Lai; Vietnam	14:41.30
10,000 metres	Agus Prayogo; Indonesia	30:10.43	Jauhari Johan; Indonesia	30:43.62	Nguyễn Văn Lai; Vietnam	31:22.20
110 m hurdles	Jamras Rittidet; Thailand	13.77 GR, NR	Rayzam Shah Wan Sofian; Malaysia	13.86	Mohd Robani Hasaan; Malaysia	14.14
400 m hurdles	Đào Xuân Cường; Vietnam	51.45 NR	Narongdech Janjai; Thailand	51.60	Andrian; Indonesia	51.70
3000 m steeplechase	Rene Herrera; Philippines	8:52.23	Muhammad Al Quraisy; Indonesia	8:55.91 NR	Nguyễn Đăng Đức Bảo; Vietnam	8:57.88
4×100 m relay	Indonesia; Fernando Lumain; Franklin Ramses Burumi; Muhammad Fadlin; Farrell Oktaviandi	39.91	Singapore; Calvin Kang; Muhammad Amiruddin Jamal; Lee Cheng Wei; Gary Yeo	39.91	Malaysia; Mohd Zabidi Ghazali; Mohd Ikhwan Nor; Mohd Azhar Ismail; Mohammad Noor Imran	40.41
4×400 m relay	Philippines; Edgardo Alejan; Julius Nierras; Junrey Ocampo Bano; Archand Christian Bagsit	3:11.16	Thailand; Jukkatip Pojaroen; Saharat Sammayan; Nitipol Thongpoon; Suppachai Chimdee	3:14.90	Singapore; Zaki Sapari; Ng Chin Hui; Kenneth Khoo Kian Song; Lance Tan Wei Sheng	3:18.50
Marathon	Yahuza; Indonesia	2:27:45	Eric Panique; Philippines	2:28:26	Eduardo Buenavista; Philippines	2:29:09
20 km walk	Lo Choon Sieng; Malaysia	1:32:34	Hendro Yap; Indonesia	1:33:23	Nguyễn Thành Ngưng; Vietnam	1:35:48
High jump	Lee Hup Wei; Malaysia	2.15 m	Pramote Pumurai; Thailand	2.12 m	Nguyễn Duy Bằng; Vietnam	2.08 m
Pole vault	Kreeta Sintawacheewa; Thailand	5.10 m	Sompong Saombankuay; Thailand	5.00 m	Edwin Chong Ming Xung; Singapore	4.70 m
Long jump	Supanara Sukhasvasti; Thailand	7.86 m	Henry Dagmil; Philippines	7.78 m	Benigno Marayag; Philippines	7.61 m
Triple jump	Theerayut Philakong; Thailand	16.43 m	Nguyễn Văn Hùng; Vietnam	16.39 m	Varunyoo Kongnil; Thailand	16.14 m
Shot put	Chatchawal Polyiam; Thailand	17.74 m	Adi Aliffudin Hussin; Malaysia	17.54 m NR	Promrob Juntima; Thailand	17.08 m
Discus throw	James Wong Tuck Yim; Singapore	51.32 m	Hermanto; Indonesia	50.56 m	Kwanchai Nunsomboo; Thailand	50.28 m
Hammer throw	Tantipong Phetchaiya; Thailand	61.46 m	Arniel Ferrera; Philippines	60.19 m	Jackie Wong Siew Cheer; Malaysia	57.04 m
Javelin throw	Nguyễn Trường Giang; Vietnam	69.07 m	Nontach Palanupat; Thailand	68.87 m	Danilo Fresnido; Philippines	66.27 m
Decathlon	Vũ Văn Huyện; Vietnam	7223 pts	Nguyễn Văn Huệ; Vietnam	6830 pts	Zakaria Malik; Indonesia	6602 pts

- ^{†} : Malaysia's Mohd Jironi Riduan finished third in the 1500 m but was disqualified for pulling on another athlete's shirt.
- ^{††} : Malaysia's final leg runner in the 400 m relay failed a drug test at the competition and was later banned.

=== Women ===
Event	Gold		Silver		Bronze	
100 metres (Wind: +1.7 m/s)	Serafi Anelies Unani; Indonesia	11.69	Nongnuch Sanrat; Thailand	11.69	Vũ Thị Hương; Vietnam	11.73
200 metres	Laphassaporn Tawoncharoen; Thailand	23.65	Lê Ngọc Phượng; Vietnam	24.01	Vũ Thị Hương; Vietnam	24.06
400 metres	Treewadee Yongphan; Thailand	54.13	Nguyễn Thị Thúy; Vietnam	54.27	Kay Khaing Lwin; Myanmar	55.28
800 metres	Trương Thanh Hằng; Vietnam	2:02.65	Đỗ Thị Thảo; Vietnam	2:05.62	Olivia Sadi; Indonesia	2:08.41
1500 metres	Trương Thanh Hằng; Vietnam	4:15.75	Đỗ Thị Thảo; Vietnam	4:18.94	Olivia Sadi; Indonesia	4:21.19
5000 metres	Triyaningsih; Indonesia	16:06.37	Phyu War Thet; Myanmar	16:12.23	Rini Budiarti; Indonesia	16:31.85
10,000 metres	Triyaningsih; Indonesia	34:52.74	Phạm Thị Bình; Vietnam	36:04.83	Phạm Thị Hiền; Vietnam	36:16.84
100 m hurdles (Wind: +0.7 m/s)	Wallapa Punsoongneun; Thailand	13.51	Dedeh Erawati; Indonesia	13.53	Wassana Winatho; Thailand	13.77
400 m hurdles	Noraseela Khalid; Malaysia	57.41	Wassana Winatho; Thailand	58.97	Viera Melissa Hetharie; Indonesia	59.64 NR
3000 m steeplechase	Rini Budiarti; Indonesia	10:00.58 GR, NR	Nguyễn Thị Phương; Vietnam	10:04.42	Yulianingsih; Indonesia	10:48.97
4×100 m relay	Thailand; Nongnuch Sanrat; Laphassaporn Tawoncharoen; Phatsorn Jaksuninkorn; Neeranuch Klomdee	44.40	Indonesia; Nurul Imaniar; Tri Setyo Utami; Serafi Anelies Unani; Dedeh Erawati	45.00 NR	Vietnam; Lê Thị Mộng Tuyền; Lê Ngọc Phượng; Trương Thanh Hằng; Vũ Thị Hương	45.12
4×400 m relay	Thailand; Saowalee Kaewchuay; Pornpan Hoemhuk; Laphassaporn Tawoncharoen; Treewadee Yongphan	3:41.35	Indonesia; Sulastri; Viera Mellisa Hetharie; Musyafidah; Nining Souhaly	3:44.65	Vietnam; Nguyễn Thị Thúy; Nguyễn Thị Oanh; Vũ Thùy Trang; Nguyễn Thị Huyền	3:45.03
Marathon	Triyaningsih; Indonesia	2:45:35	Ni Lar San; Myanmar	2:46:37	Phạm Thị Bình; Vietnam	2:48:43
20 km walk	Nguyễn Thị Thanh Phúc; Vietnam	1:43:22	Kay Khaing Myo Tun; Myanmar	1:45:19	Darwati; Indonesia	1:46:04
High jump	Dương Thị Việt Anh; Vietnam	1.90 m	Wanida Boonwan; Thailand	1.87 m	Phạm Thị Diễm; Vietnam	1.87 m
Pole vault	Roslinda Samsu; Malaysia	4.20 m GR	Lê Thị Phương; Vietnam	4.20 m GR NR	Ni Putu Desi Margawati; Indonesia	3.90 m
Long jump	Marestella Torres; Philippines	6.71 m GR	Maria Natalia Londa; Indonesia	6.47 m NR	Katherine Santos; Philippines	6.25 m
Triple jump	Trần Huệ Hoa; Vietnam	13.76 m NR	Maria Natalia Londa; Indonesia	13.73 m NR	Thitima Muangjan; Thailand	13.64 m
Shot put	Zhang Guirong; Singapore	16.96 m	Wan Lay Chi; Singapore	14.59 m	Juttaporn Krasaeyan; Thailand	14.37 m
Discus throw	Subenrat Insaeng; Thailand	52.25 m GR	Dwi Ratnawati; Indonesia	49.98 m	Zhang Guirong; Singapore	48.22 m
Hammer throw	Tang Song Hwa; Malaysia	55.15 m	Rose Herlinda Inggriana; Indonesia	51.95 m	Loralie Sermona; Philippines	49.69 m
Javelin throw	Natta Nachan; Thailand	48.80 m	Rosie Villarito; Philippines	47.35 m	Saowalak Pettong; Thailand	46.73 m
Heptathlon	Wassana Winatho; Thailand	5488 pts	Narcisa Atienza; Philippines	5285 pts	Dương Thị Việt Anh; Vietnam	5196 pts

== Medal table ==
* Host nation (Indonesia)

Rank	Nation	Gold	Silver	Bronze	Total
1	Thailand	14	9	9	32
2	Indonesia*	13	12	11	36
3	Vietnam	9	9	14	32
4	Malaysia	5	2	3	10
5	Philippines	3	9	5	17
6	Singapore	2	3	3	8
7	Myanmar	0	3	1	4
Totals (7 entries)		46	47	46	139
