= Athletics at the 2013 SEA Games – Men's 10,000 metres =

The men's 10000 metres at the 2013 SEA Games was part of the athletics events and was held in Naypyidaw, Myanmar. The track and field event took place at the Wunna Theikdi Stadiumon December 17.

== Schedule ==
All times are Myanmar Standard Time (UTC+06:30)

Date	Time	Event
Thursday, 19 December 2013	08:00	Final

== Records ==
Prior to this competition, the existing world, Asian, and Southeast Asian Games records were as follows.

World Record	Kenenisa Bekele (ETH)	26:17.53	Brussels, Belgium	26 August 2005
Asian Record	Ahmad Hassan Abdullah (QAT)	26:38.76	Brussels, Belgium	5 September 2003
Games Record	Eduardo Buenavista (PHI)	29:19.97	Hanoi, Vietnam	7 December 2003

== Results ==
Rank	Athlete	Time	Notes
1st place, gold medalist(s)	Nguyen Van Lai (VIE)	29:44.82	NR
2nd place, silver medalist(s)	Boonthung Srisung (THA)	29:46.61	
3rd place, bronze medalist(s)	Agus Prayogo (INA)	30:25.33	
4	Sanchai Namkhet (THA)	30:35.54	
5	Soe Min Thu (MYA)	30:46.69	
6	Jauhari Johan (INA)	30:54.14	
7	Thein Hlaing Oo (MYA)	31:29.27	
—	Viro Ma (CAM)	DNS	
