= List of Vietnamese records in athletics =

The following are the national records in athletics in Vietnam maintained by the Vietnam Athletics Federation (VAF).

== Outdoor ==
Key to tables: Awaiting ratification Record not kept by VAF

=== Men ===
Event	Record	Athlete	Date	Meet	Place	Ref.
100 m	10.35 (+0.7 m/s)	Ngần Ngọc Nghĩa	14 December 2022	Vietnam National Games	Hanoi, Vietnam	
100 m	10.2 h (NWI)	Lương Tích Thiện	11 May 2001		Hanoi, Vietnam	
200 m	20.74 (±0.0 m/s)	Ngần Ngọc Nghĩa	14 May 2022	Southeast Asian Games	Hanoi, Vietnam	
400 m	45.50	Tạ Ngọc Tưởng	11 July 2026	Asian U23 Championships	Ordos, China	
800 m	1:48.97	Dương Văn Thái	23 August 2017	Southeast Asian Games	Kuala Lumpur, Malaysia	
1500 m	3:45.31	Nguyễn Đình Cương	11 December 2007	Southeast Asian Games	Nakhon Ratchasima, Thailand	
3000 m	8:49.97	Nguyễn Đăng Đức Bảo	30 June 2008		Hanoi, Vietnam	
5000 m	14:04.82	Nguyễn Văn Lai	9 June 2015	Southeast Asian Games	Kallang, Singapore	
10,000 m	29:44.82	Nguyễn Văn Lai	19 December 2013	Southeast Asian Games	Naypyidaw, Myanmar	
Half marathon	1:06:40	Hoàng Nguyên Thanh	1 January 2024	Vietnam International Half Marathon	Hanoi, Vietnam	
Marathon	2:18:42 (Note: by World Athletics source; 2:18:43 by other sources; 2:08:42 by VAF source, a typo)	Hoàng Nguyên Thanh	21 January 2024	Hong Kong Marathon	Hong Kong, Hong Kong	
110 m hurdles	14.19	Nguyễn Ngọc Quang	13 November 2011	Southeast Asian Games	Palembang, Indonesia	
400 m hurdles	50.05	Quách Công Lịch	22 August 2017	Southeast Asian Games	Kuala Lumpur, Malaysia	
3000 m steeplechase	8:51.16	Nguyễn Trung Cường	12 July 2018	World U20 Championships	Tampere, Finland	
High jump	2.25 m	Nguyễn Duy Bằng	28 September 2004		Singapore	
Pole vault	4.91 m	Nguyễn Văn Huệ	12 October 2015		Ho Chi Minh City, Vietnam	
Long jump	7.98 m	Nguyễn Tiến Trọng	18 September 2019	Vietnamese Championships	Ho Chi Minh City, Vietnam	
Triple jump	16.67 m (+1.3 m/s)	Nguyễn Văn Hùng	19 December 2013	Southeast Asian Games	Naypyidaw, Myanmar	
Shot put	17.39 m	Phan Thanh Bình	9 May 2023	Southeast Asian Games	Phnom Penh, Cambodia	
Discus throw	55.17 m	Đỗ Tấn Trưởng	18 September 2019	Vietnamese Championships	Ho Chi Minh City, Vietnam	
Hammer throw	54.24 m	Đỗ Tấn Trưởng	26 October 2017	Vietnamese Championships	Hanoi, Vietnam	
Javelin throw	73.18 m	Nguyễn Hoài Văn	18 July 2019	Ho Chi Minh International Open	Ho Chi Minh City, Vietnam	
Decathlon	7755 pts	Vũ Văn Huyện	24–25 November 2010 (Note: by official result source; 27 November 2010 by VAF source, a typo)	Asian Games	Guangzhou, China	
Decathlon	100m (wind) / Long jump (wind) / Shot put / High jump / 400m / 110m H (wind) / Discus / Pole vault / Javelin / 1500m; 10.76 (+1.6 m/s) / 7.16 m (+0.7 m/s) / 11.80 m / 1.97 m / 48.93 / 15.13 (+1.3 m/s) / 41.36 m / 4.70 m / 55.14 m / 4:30.20					
3000 m walk (track)	15:00.83	Nguyễn Huy Thắng	16 June 2012		Vĩnh Long, Vietnam	
5000 m walk (track)	23:14.21	Phùng Kim Quang	9 October 2020		Tây Ninh, Vietnam	
5 km walk (road)	20:56+	Nguyễn Thành Ngưng	20 March 2016	Asian Race Walking Championships	Nomi, Japan	
10 km walk (road)	41:50+	Nguyễn Thành Ngưng	20 March 2016	Asian Race Walking Championships	Nomi, Japan	
15 km walk (road)	1:02:58+	Nguyễn Thành Ngưng	20 March 2016	Asian Race Walking Championships	Nomi, Japan	
10,000 m walk (track)	44:22.08	Nguyễn Thành Ngưng	11 July 2012		Ho Chi Minh City, Vietnam	
20,000 m walk (track)	1:36:09+	Nguyễn Thành Ngưng	17 September 2019	Vietnamese Championships	Ho Chi Minh City, Vietnam	
20 km walk (road)	1:23:29	Nguyễn Thành Ngưng	20 March 2016	Asian Race Walking Championships	Nomi, Japan	
50 km walk (road)						
4 × 100 m relay	39.87	Vietnam; Nguyễn Đình Vũ; Trịnh Việt Tú; Lê Quyền Lợi; Ngần Ngọc Nghĩa	16 May 2022	Southeast Asian Games	Hanoi, Vietnam	
4 × 100 m relay	39.04	People's Public Security Team; Trương Văn Hiếu; Triệu Thái Sơn; Đinh Hoàng Quốc Bảo; Ngần Ngọc Nghĩa	22 August 2026	Vietnamese Relay Championships	Quảng Ngãi, Vietnam	
4 × 200 m relay	1:24.63	Thanh Hóa Team; Trung; Lê Trọng Hinh; Lương Văn Thao; Lê Hồng Hữu	9 October 2015		Ho Chi Minh City, Vietnam	
4 × 200 m relay	1:22.07	People's Public Security Team; Trương Văn Hiếu; Đinh Hoàng Quốc Bảo; Lâm Quang Huy; Ngần Ngọc Nghĩa	23 August 2026	Vietnamese Relay Championships	Quảng Ngãi, Vietnam	
4 × 400 m relay	3:02.60	Vietnam; Tạ Ngọc Tưởng; Vũ Ngọc Khánh; Trần Đình Sơn; Lê Ngọc Phúc	21 June 2026	2nd Asian Relay Championships	Shaoxing, China	
4 × 800 m relay	7:37.76	Đắk Lắk Team; Tran Van Cat; Ngo Dang Thanh; Nguyễn Van Han; Pham Cao Son	29 December 2010	Vietnam National Games	Da Nang, Vietnam	
4 × 800 m relay	7:33.02	Đồng Nai Team; Lương Đức Phước; Sầm Văn Đời; Lý Toàn Phát Dĩ; Trương Nhật Linh	23 August 2026	Vietnamese Relay Championships	Quảng Ngãi, Vietnam	

=== Women ===
Event	Record	Athlete	Date	Meet	Place	Ref.
100 m	11.34 (±0.0 m/s)	Vũ Thị Hương	13 December 2009	Southeast Asian Games	Vientiane, Laos	
100 m	11.33 w (Note: windy conditions but recognised by VAF)	Vũ Thị Hương	26 July 2007	Asian Championships	Amman, Jordan	
200 m	23.14 (+1.0 m/s)	Lê Thị Cẩm Tú	13 December 2025	Southeast Asian Games	Bangkok, Thailand	
300 m	38.64	Vũ Thị Hương	22 May 2011	Internationales Läufermeeting	Pliezhausen, Germany	
400 m	51.83	Nguyễn Thị Tĩnh	8 November 2003	Southeast Asian Games	Hanoi, Vietnam	
800 m	2:00.91	Trương Thanh Hằng	25 November 2010	Asian Games	Guangzhou, China	
1500 m	4:09.58	Trương Thanh Hằng	23 November 2010	Asian Games	Guangzhou, China	
3000 m	9:50.3	Nguyễn Thị Xuân Thanh	2 May 1997		Hanoi, Vietnam	
5000 m	15:46.11	Nguyễn Thị Oanh	31 May 2025	Asian Championships	Gumi, South Korea	
10,000 m	33:13.23	Nguyễn Thị Oanh	17 December 2022	Vietnam National Games	Hanoi, Vietnam	
Half marathon	1:15:10 (Note: by VAF source; 1:15:11 by other sources)	Nguyễn Thị Oanh	1 January 2024	Vietnam International Half Marathon	Hanoi, Vietnam	
Marathon	2:44:51	Hoàng Thị Ngọc Hoa	21 January 2024	Hong Kong Marathon	Hong Kong, Hong Kong	
100 m hurdles	13.36 (NWI)	Vũ Bích Hường	9 August 1999	Southeast Asian Games	Bandar Seri Begawan, Brunei	
100 m hurdles	13.36 (+0.9 m/s)	Vũ Bích Hường	25 August 1999	World Championships	Seville, Spain	
400 m hurdles	55.30	Quách Thị Lan	27 August 2018	Asian Games	Jakarta, Indonesia	
3000 m steeplechase	9:43.83	Nguyễn Thị Oanh	27 August 2018	Asian Games	Jakarta, Indonesia	
High jump	1.94 m	Bùi Thị Nhung	4 May 2005		Bangkok, Thailand	
Pole vault	4.20 m	Lê Thị Phương	15 November 2011	Southeast Asian Games	Palembang, Indonesia	
Long jump	6.68 m (+0.2 m/s)	Bùi Thị Thu Thảo	24 August 2017	Southeast Asian Games	Kuala Lumpur, Malaysia	
Triple jump	14.15 m (+0.1 m/s)	Vũ Thị Mến	23 August 2017	Southeast Asian Games	Kuala Lumpur, Malaysia	
Shot put	14.56 m	Ka Hoa	18 July 2017	Ho Chi Minh International Open	Ho Chi Minh City, Vietnam	
Discus throw	48.40 m	Nguyễn Thị Hồng Thương	24 November 2016	Vietnamese Championships	Hanoi, Vietnam	
Hammer throw	51.27 m	Phạm Thị Thanh Trúc	26 October 2017	Vietnamese Championships	Hanoi, Vietnam	
Javelin throw	56.37 m	Lò Thị Hoàng	18 May 2022	Southeast Asian Games	Hanoi, Vietnam	
Heptathlon	5440 pts h (NWI)	Nguyễn Linh Na	14–15 December 2022	Vietnam National Games	Hanoi, Vietnam	
Heptathlon	100m H (wind) / High jump / Shot put / 200m (wind) / Long jump (wind) / Javelin / 800m; 14.50 (+0.7 m/s) / 1.71 m / 11.86 m / 25.41 (NWI) / 5.76 m (NWI) / 38.69 m / 2:26.07					
3000 m walk (track)	15:13.33	Lương Thị Nhất	8 October 2020		Tây Ninh, Vietnam	
5000 m walk (track)	22:35.76	Nguyễn Thị Thanh Phúc	21 July 2013		Ho Chi Minh City, Vietnam	
10,000 m walk (track)	50:39.74	Nguyễn Thị Thanh Phúc	18 September 2019	Vietnamese Championships	Ho Chi Minh City, Vietnam	
20,000 m walk (track)	1:35:15.00	Nguyễn Thị Thanh Phúc	11 March 2012		Japan	
10 km walk (road)	46:09+	Nguyễn Thị Thanh Phúc	11 August 2012	Olympic Games	London, United Kingdom	
20 km walk (road)	1:33:36	Nguyễn Thị Thanh Phúc	11 August 2012	Olympic Games	London, United Kingdom	
50 km walk (road)						
4 × 100 m relay	43.88	Vietnam; Lê Thị Mộng Tuyền; Đỗ Thị Quyên; Trần Thị Yến Hoa; Lê Tú Chinh	25 August 2017	Southeast Asian Games	Kuala Lumpur, Malaysia	
4 × 200 m relay	1:34.51	Ha Noi Team; Phùng Thị Huệ; Nguyễn Thị Kim Ngọc; Hoàng Thị Minh Hạnh [[Nguyễn Thị Hằng (athlete)|Nguyễn Thị Hằng]]	11 August 2025	Vietnamese Championships	Da Nang, Vietnam	
4 × 400 m relay	3:30.81	Vietnam; Lan; Hằng; Hạnh; Ngọc	21 May 2024	1st Asian Relay Championships	Bangkok, Thailand	
4 × 800 m relay	8:50.83	Nam Định Team; Trần Thị Duyên; Đinh Thị Bích; Phạm Thị Ngọt; Bùi Thị Ngân	16 September 2019	Vietnamese Championships	Ho Chi Minh City, Vietnam	

=== Mixed ===
Event	Record	Athlete	Date	Meet	Place	Ref.
4 × 100 m relay	42.54	Ho Chi Minh Team; Hà Thị Thu; Lê Tú Chinh; Nguyễn Đăng Khoa; Lê Quyền Lợi	11 November 2020	Vietnamese National Championships	Hanoi, Vietnam	
4 × 400 m relay	3:14.54	Vietnam; Ta Ngoc Tuong; Quach Thi Lan; Le Ngoc Phuc; Nguyễn Thị Ngọc	24 September 2026	Asian Games	Nagoya, Japan	

== Indoor ==
=== Men ===
Event	Record	Athlete	Date	Meet	Place	Ref.
60 m	6.80	Nguyễn Văn Mùa	31 October 2009	Asian Indoor Games	Hanoi, Vietnam	
200 m	21.78	Quách Công Lịch	31 January 2016	KMS Invitational	Birmingham, United States	
400 m	47.44	Quách Công Lịch	13 February 2016	Samford Open	Birmingham, United States	
800 m	1:57.89	Nguyen Ba The	1 October 2009		Hanoi, Vietnam	
1500 m	4:03.64	Tran Van Tuyen	1 October 2009		Hanoi, Vietnam	
3000 m	8:24.69	Nguyễn Văn Lai	19 September 2017	Asian Indoor and Martial Arts Games	Ashgabat, Turkmenistan	
60 m hurdles	8.19	Trần Nghĩa Nhân	1 October 2009		Hanoi, Vietnam	
High jump	2.15 m	Nguyễn Duy Bằng	1 October 2009		Hanoi, Vietnam	
Pole vault	4.60 m	Vũ Văn Huyện	2 November 2009	Asian Indoor Games	Hanoi, Vietnam	
Long jump	7.48 m	Nguyễn Tiến Trọng	19 September 2017	Asian Indoor and Martial Arts Games	Ashgabat, Turkmenistan	
Triple jump	15.61 m	Nguyễn Văn Hùng	2 November 2009	Asian Indoor Games	Hanoi, Vietnam	
Shot put	13.67 m	Ngô Đăng Quang	1 October 2009		Hanoi, Vietnam	
Heptathlon	5622 pts	Vũ Văn Huyện	2 November 2009	Asian Indoor Games	Hanoi, Vietnam	
Heptathlon	60m / Long jump / Shot put / High jump / 60m H / Pole vault / 1000m; 6.96 / 7.18 m / 11.64 m / 2.00 m / 8.43 / 4.60 m / 2:45.52					
5000 m walk						
4 × 400 m relay	3:23.10	DHI Team	1 October 2009		Hanoi, Vietnam	

=== Women ===
Event	Record	Athlete	Date	Meet	Place	Ref.
60 m	7.24	Vũ Thị Hương	31 October 2009	Asian Indoor Games	Hanoi, Vietnam	
200 m	24.86	Quách Thị Lan	31 January 2016	KMS Invitational	Birmingham, United States	
400 m	54.41	Nguyễn Thị Hằng	19 September 2017	Asian Indoor and Martial Arts Games	Ashgabat, Turkmenistan	
800 m	2:03.65	Trương Thanh Hằng	2 November 2009	Asian Indoor Games	Hanoi, Vietnam	
1500 m	4:15.55	Nguyễn Thị Oanh	11 February 2023	Asian Championships	Astana, Kazakhstan	
3000 m	9:36.38	Bùi Thị Hiền	1 November 2007	Asian Indoor Games	Macau	
60 m hurdles	8.49	Vũ Thị Hằng Ni	2 November 2009	Asian Indoor Games	Hanoi, Vietnam	
High jump	1.90 m	Bùi Thị Nhung	11 February 2007		Macau	
Pole vault	4.00 m	Lê Thị Phương	31 October 2009	Asian Indoor Games	Hanoi, Vietnam	
Long jump	6.36 m	Bùi Thị Thu Thảo	18 September 2017	Asian Indoor and Martial Arts Games	Ashgabat, Turkmenistan	
Triple jump	12.61 m	Bùi Thị Nhật Thanh	13 November 2005		Pattaya, Thailand	
Shot put	10.78 m	Nguyễn Thị Thu Cúc	31 October 2009	Asian Indoor Games	Hanoi, Vietnam	
Pentathlon	3812 pts	Dương Thị Việt Anh	19 February 2012	Asian Championships	Hangzhou, China	
Pentathlon	60m H / High jump / Shot put / Long jump / 800m; 8.99 / 1.83 m / 10.10 m / 5.82 m / 2:41.7 h					
3000 m walk						
4 × 400 m relay	3:58.23	Vietnam	1 October 2009		Hanoi, Vietnam	
