= Athletics at the 2019 SEA Games =

- Venue: New Clark City Athletics Stadium
- Dates: 6–10 December

Athletics or track and field competitions at the 2019 SEA Games were held from 6 to 10 December 2019. Athletics are held in the New Clark City Athletics Stadium from 6 to 10 December 2019. The New Clark City Athletics Stadium was used as its venue.

== Medal summary ==
=== Medal table ===
* Host nation (Philippines)

| Rank | Nation | Gold | Silver | Bronze | Total |
|---|---|---|---|---|---|
| 1 | Vietnam (VIE) | 16 | 12 | 10 | 38 |
| 2 | Thailand (THA) | 12 | 11 | 12 | 35 |
| 3 | Philippines (PHI)* | 11 | 8 | 8 | 27 |
| 4 | Malaysia (MAS) | 5 | 9 | 7 | 21 |
| 5 | Indonesia (INA) | 5 | 6 | 5 | 16 |
| 6 | Myanmar (MYA) | 0 | 1 | 2 | 3 |
| 7 | Singapore (SGP) | 0 | 0 | 3 | 3 |
| 8 | Laos (LAO) | 0 | 0 | 1 | 1 |
| Totals (8 entries) | | 49 | 47 | 48 | 144 |

=== Men's events ===
Key
| GR | SEA Games record | NR | National record |

| Event | Gold | | Silver | | Bronze | |
|---|---|---|---|---|---|---|
| 100 m | Muhammad Haiqal Hanafi; Malaysia | 10.35 | Ruttanapon Sowan; Thailand | 10.49 | Bandit Chuangchai; Thailand | 10.52 |
| 200 m | Chayut Khongprasit; Thailand | 20.71 | Siripol Punpa; Thailand | 20.78 | Russel Alexander Nasir Taib; Malaysia | 21.11 |
| 400 m | Trần Nhật Hoàng; Vietnam | 46.56 | Trần Đình Sơn; Vietnam | 46.68 | Phitchaya Sunthonthuam; Thailand | 46.98 |
| 800 m | Dương Văn Thái; Vietnam | 1:49.91 | Carter Lilly; Philippines | 1:50.17 | Royson Vincent; Malaysia | 1:50.68 |
| 1500 m | Dương Văn Thái; Vietnam | 4:06.63 | Mariano Masano; Philippines | 4:08.27 | Yothin Yaprajan; Thailand | 4:08.90 |
| 5000 m | Kieran Tuntivate; Thailand | 14:31.15 | Nguyễn Văn Lai; Vietnam | 14:32.42 | Sonny Wagdos; Philippines | 14:34.73 |
| 10000 m | Kieran Tuntivate; Thailand | 30:19.28 | Agus Prayogo; Indonesia | 30:22.13 | Nguyễn Văn Lai; Vietnam | 30:29.73 |
| 110 m hurdles | Clinton Bautista; Philippines | 13.97 | Rayzam Shah Wan Sofian; Malaysia | 13.97 | Anousone Xaysa; Laos | 13.99 |
| 400 m hurdles | Eric Cray; Philippines | 50.21 | Halomoan Edwin Binsar; Indonesia | 50.81 | Quách Công Lịch; Vietnam | 51.60 |
| 3000 m steeplechase | Đỗ Quốc Luật; Vietnam | 9:04.50 | Nguyễn Trung Cường; Vietnam | 9:04.54 | Atjong Tio Purwanto; Indonesia | 9:10.02 |
| 4 × 100 m relay | Thailand; Ruttanapon Sowan; Bandit Chuangchai; Jirapong Meenapra; Siripol Punpa | 39.27 | Malaysia; Nixson Kennedy; Muhammad Haiqal Hanafi; Khairul Hafiz Jantan; Russel Alexander Nasir Taib | 39.78 | Philippines; Anfernee Lopena; Clinton Bautista; Francis Medina; Eric Cray | 40.04 |
| 4 × 400 m relay | Vietnam; Quách Công Lịch; Lương Văn Thao; Trần Đình Sơn; Trần Nhật Hoàng | 3:08.07 | Thailand; Thipthanet Sripha; Phitchaya Sunthonthuam; Apisit Chamsri; Nattapong Kongkraphan | 3:08.20 | Philippines; Edgardo Alejan Jr. Micheal Carlo Del Prado; Frederick Ramirez; Joyme Sequita | 3:08.63 |
| Marathon | Agus Prayogo; Indonesia | 2:26:48 | Sanchai Namkhet; Thailand | 2:27:18 | Muhaizar Mohamad; Malaysia | 2:33:08 |
| 20 km walk | Hendro Yap; Indonesia | 1:31:20 | Võ Xuân Vĩnh; Vietnam | 1:31:38 | Mine Nyi Nyi Moe; Myanmar | 1:33:25 |
| High jump | Lee Hup Wei; Malaysia | 2.21 m | Nauraj Singh Randhawa; Malaysia | 2.21 m | Tawan Kaeodam; Thailand | 2.15 m |
| Pole vault | Ernest Obiena; Philippines | 5.45 m GR | Porranot Purahong; Thailand | 5.20 m | Iskandar Alwi; Malaysia | 5.00 m |
| Long jump | Sapwaturrahman; Indonesia | 8.03 m GR | Andre Anura; Malaysia | 8.02 m NR | Sutthisak Singkhon; Thailand | 7.89 m |
| Triple jump | Hakimi Ismail; Malaysia | 16.68 m | Mark Harry Diones; Philippines | 16.42 m | Sapwaturrahman; Indonesia | 16.21 m |
| Shot put | William Morrison III; Philippines | 18.38 m NR | Muhammad Ziyad Zolkefli; Malaysia | 17.03 m | Promrob Juntima; Thailand | 16.40 m |
| Discus throw | Irfan Shamsuddin; Malaysia | 57.29 m | William Morrison III; Philippines | 51.38 m | Narong Benjaroon; Thailand | 51.29 m |
| Hammer throw | Kittipong Boonmawan; Thailand | 67.56 m GR, NR | Jackie Wong; Malaysia | 63.83 m | Ye Htet Aung; Myanmar | 58.88 m NR |
| Javelin throw | Melvin Calano; Philippines | 72.86 m | Abdul Hafiz; Indonesia | 71.00 m | Nguyễn Hoài Văn; Vietnam | 70.88 m |
| Decathlon | Aries Toledo; Philippines | 7033 pts. | Bùi Văn Sự; Vietnam | 6911 pts. | Janry Ubas; Philippines | 6769 pts. |

=== Women's events ===
| Event | Gold | | Silver | | Bronze | |
|---|---|---|---|---|---|---|
| 100 m | Lê Tú Chinh; Vietnam | 11.54 | Kristina Knott; Philippines | 11.55 | Veronica Shanti Pereira; Singapore | 11.66 |
| 200 m | Kristina Knott; Philippines | 23.01 GR | Lê Tú Chinh; Vietnam | 23.45 | Veronica Shanti Pereira; Singapore | 23.77 |
| 400 m | Nguyễn Thị Huyền; Vietnam | 52.80 | Chinenye Onuorah; Thailand | 53.81 | Quách Thị Lan; Vietnam | 53.95 |
| 800 m | Đinh Thị Bích; Vietnam | 2:07.16 | Khuất Phương Anh; Vietnam | 2:08.24 | Agustina Mardika Manik; Indonesia | 2:09.61 |
| 1500 m | Nguyễn Thị Oanh; Vietnam | 4:17.31 | Agustina Mardika Manik; Indonesia | 4:22.60 | Khuất Phương Anh; Vietnam | 4:23.47 |
| 5000 m | Nguyễn Thị Oanh; Vietnam | 16:45.98 | Phạm Thị Huệ; Vietnam | 16:52.35 | Joida Gagnao; Philippines | 17:52.16 |
| 10000 m | Phạm Thị Huệ; Vietnam | 36:23.24 | Phạm Thị Hồng Lệ; Vietnam | 36:32.24 | Odekta Elvina Naibaho; Indonesia | 36:42.28 |
| 100 m hurdles | Emilia Nova; Indonesia | 13.61 | Trần Thị Yến Hoa; Vietnam | 13.75 | Nur Izlyn Zaini; Singapore | 13.92 |
| 400 m hurdles | Nguyễn Thị Huyền; Vietnam | 56.90 | Quach Thi Lan; Vietnam | 57.39 | Robyn Lauren Brown; Philippines | 59.08 |
| 3000 m steeplechase | Nguyễn Thị Oanh; Vietnam | 10:00.02 GR | Joida Gagnao; Philippines | 10:59.91 | Pretty Sihite; Indonesia | 11:05.93 |
| 4 × 100 m relay | Thailand; Supawan Thipat; Uma Chatta-on; Kwanrutai Pakdee; Tassaporn Wannakit | 44.38 | Philippines; Kristina Knott; Kayla Richardson; Kyla Richardson; Zion Nelson | 44.57 | Vietnam; Hà Thị Thu; Lê Tú Chinh; Lê Thị Mộng Tuyền; Trần Thị Yến Hoa | 45.17 |
| 4 × 400 m relay | Vietnam; Nguyễn Thị Oanh; Quách Thị Lan; Hoàng Thị Ngọc; Nguyễn Thị Hằng | 3:34.64 | Thailand; Sukanya Janchaona; Supanich Poolkerd; Arisa Weruwanarak; Chinenye Onuorah | 3:39.78 | Philippines; Eloiza Luzon; Jessel Lumapas; Maureen Schrijvers; Robyn Lauren Brown | 3:43.41 |
| Marathon | Christine Hallasgo; Philippines | 2:56:56 | Mary Joy Tabal; Philippines | 2:58:49 | Phạm Thị Hồng Lệ; Vietnam | 3:02:52 |
| 10 km walk | Phạm Thị Thu Trang; Vietnam | 52:59.45 | Than Than Soe; Myanmar | 53:29.89 | Elena Goh Ling Yin; Malaysia | 53:38.71 |
| High jump | Yap Sean Yee; Malaysia | 1.81 m | shared gold | | Phạm Thị Diễm; Vietnam | 1.78 m |
| High jump | Wanida Boonwan; Thailand | 1.81 m | shared gold | | Phạm Thị Diễm; Vietnam | 1.78 m |
| Pole vault | Natalie Uy; Philippines | 4.25 m GR | Chayanisa Chomchuendee; Thailand | 4.10 m | Chonthicha Khabut; Thailand | 4.00 m |
| Long jump | Maria Natalia Londa; Indonesia | 6.47 m | Parinya Chuaimaroeng; Thailand | 6.23 m | Vũ Thị Mộng Mơ; Vietnam | 6.16 m |
| Triple jump | Parinya Chuaimaroeng; Thailand | 13.75 m | Maria Natalia Londa; Indonesia | 13.60 m | Vũ Thị Mến; Vietnam | 13.55 m |
| Shot put | Areerat Intadis; Thailand | 15.80 m | Eki Febri Ekawati; Indonesia | 15.08 m | Athima Saowaphaiboon; Thailand | 13.36 m |
| Discus throw | Subenrat Insaeng; Thailand | 60.33 m GR | Choo Kang Ni; Malaysia | 47.02 m | Queenie Ting; Malaysia | 45.28 m |
| Hammer throw | Mingkamon Koomphon; Thailand | 55.99 m | Grace Wong; Malaysia | 55.82 m | Panwat Gimsrang; Thailand | 55.64 m |
| Javelin throw | Natta Nachan; Thailand | 55.66 m | Lò Thị Hoàng; Vietnam | 53.77 m | Jariya Wichaidit; Thailand | 51.80 m |
| Heptathlon | Sarah Dequinan; Philippines | 5101 pts. | Norliyana Kamaruddin; Malaysia | 4906 pts. | Sunisa Khotseemueang; Thailand | 4730 pts. |

=== Mixed ===
| Event | Gold | | Silver | | Bronze | |
|---|---|---|---|---|---|---|
| 4 × 100 m relay | Philippines; Eloiza Luzon; Anfernee Lopena; Kristina Knott; Eric Cray | 41.67 | Thailand; Tassaporn Wannakit; Chayut Khongprasit; Kwanrutai Pakdee; Nutthapong Veeravongratanasiri | 41.99 | Malaysia; Azreen Nabila Alias; Jonathan Nyepa; Zaidatul Husniah Zulkifli; Nixson Kennedy | 42.40 |
| 4 × 400 m relay | Vietnam; Nguyễn Thị Hằng; Trần Nhật Hoàng; Quách Thị Lan; Trần Đình Sơn | 3:19.50 | Thailand; Pratchaya Prapas; Chinenye Onuorah; Arisa Weruwanarak; Pipatporn Paungpi | 3:26.09 | Philippines; Raymond Alferos; Robyn Lauren Brown; Maureen Schrijvers; Edgardo Alejan Jr. | 3:26.95 |
