= Athletics at the 2023 SEA Games =

Track and field events in Phnom Penh

- Venue: Morodok Techo National Stadium (track and field events); Angkor Wat (marathon and 20km walk)
- Date: 6–12 May
- Nations: 11

The athletics events at the 2023 SEA Games took place from 6–12 May 2023 in Phnom Penh, Cambodia. The Games featured a total of 47 events.

== Venue ==
Morodok Techo National Stadium hosted track and field events while Marathon and race walking events were held at Angkor Wat.

== Schedule ==
Legend
| P | Preliminary round | Q | Qualification | H | Heats | ½ | Semi-finals | F | Final |

Ref
| Date | May 6 | | May 7 | | May 8 | | May 9 | | May 10 | | May 11 | | May 12 | |
| Event | M | E | M | E | M | E | M | E | M | E | M | E | M | E |
Men's
| 100 m | | | | | | | | | | | | | P | F |
| 200 m | | | | | P | F | | | | | | | | |
| 400 m | | | | | | | P | F | | | | | | |
| 800 m | | | | | | | | F | | | | | | |
| 1,500 m | | | | | | F | | | | | | | | |
| 5,000 m | | | | | | | | F | | | | | | |
| 10,000 m | | | | | | | | | | | | F | | |
| 100 m hurdles | | | | | | | | | P | | | | | |
| 110 m hurdles | | | | | | | P | | | F | | | | |
| 400 m hurdles | | | | | | | | | | | | F | | |
| 3,000 m steeplechase | | | | | | | | | | F | | | | |
| 4 × 100 m relay | | | | | | | | | | F | | | | |
| 4 × 400 m relay | | | | | | | | | | | | | P | F |
| High jump | | | | | | | | | | | | | | F |
| Long jump | | | | | | | | F | | | | | | |
| Pole vault | | | | | | F | | | | | | | | |
| Shot put | | | | | | | | F | | | | | | |
| Triple jump | | | | | | | | | | | | F | | |
| Discus throw | | | | | | | | | | | | F | | |
| Hammer throw | | | | | F | | | | | | | | | |
| Javelin throw | | | | | F | | | | | | | | | |
| Decathlon | | | | | | | | F | | | | | | |
| Marathon | F | | | | | | | | | | | | | |
| 20 km race walk | | F | | | | | | | | | | | | |
Women's
| 100 m | | | | | | | | | | | | | P | F |
| 200 m | | | | | P | F | | | | | | | | |
| 400 m | | | | | | | P | F | | | | | | |
| 800 m | | | | | | | | | | F | | | | |
| 1,500 m | | | | | F | | | | | | | | | |
| 5,000 m | | | | | | F | | | | | | | | |
| 10,000 m | | | | | | | | | | | | | | |
| 100 m hurdles | | | | | | | | | P | F | | | | |
| 110 m hurdles | | | | | | | | | | | | | | |
| 400 m hurdles | | | | | | | | | | | | | | |
| 3,000 m steeplechase | | | | | | | | F | | | | | | |
| 4 × 100 m relay | | | | | | | | | | F | | | | |
| 4 × 400 m relay | | | | | | | | | | | | | | F |
| High jump | | | | | | | | F | | | | | | |
| Pole vault | | | | | | | | | | F | | | | |
| Shot put | | | | | | | | | | | | F | | |
| Triple jump | | | | | | F | | | | | | | | |
| Discus throw | | | | | | | | | | | | | | |
| Hammer throw | | | | | F | | | | | | | | | |
| Javelin throw | | | | | | | | | | | | | | F |
| Heptathlon | | | | | | | | | | | | F | | |
| Decathlon | | | | | | | | | | | | | | |
| Marathon | F | | | | | | | | | | | | | |
| 20 km race walk | | F | | | | | | | | | | | | |
Mixed
| 4 × 400 m relay | | | | | | F | | | | | | | | |

== Participating countries ==
- Brunei
- Cambodia (Host)
- Timor-Leste
- Indonesia (28)
- Laos
- Malaysia (65)
- Myanmar
- Philippines
- Singapore
- Thailand
- Vietnam

== Medal table ==
* Host nation (Cambodia)

| Rank | Nation | Gold | Silver | Bronze | Total |
|---|---|---|---|---|---|
| 1 | Thailand | 16 | 8 | 5 | 29 |
| 2 | Vietnam | 12 | 20 | 8 | 40 |
| 3 | Indonesia | 7 | 3 | 9 | 19 |
| 4 | Malaysia | 5 | 3 | 11 | 19 |
| 5 | Philippines | 4 | 10 | 8 | 22 |
| 6 | Singapore | 3 | 2 | 5 | 10 |
| 7 | Cambodia* | 1 | 0 | 0 | 1 |
| 8 | Myanmar | 0 | 0 | 2 | 2 |
| Totals (8 entries) | | 48 | 46 | 48 | 142 |

== Medalists ==
Key
| GR | SEA Games record | NR | National record |

=== Men's events ===
| Event | Gold | | Silver | | Bronze | |
|---|---|---|---|---|---|---|
| 100 m | Soraoat Dabbang; Thailand | 10.37 | Marc Brian Louis; Singapore | 10.39 | Muhammad Haiqal Hanafi; Malaysia | 10.45 (Note: 10.443 exactly to win bronze medal) |
| 200 m | Soraoat Dabbang; Thailand | 20.62 | Ngần Ngọc Nghĩa; Vietnam | 20.84 | Lalu Muhammad Zohri; Indonesia | 21.02 |
| 400 m | Umar Osman; Malaysia | 46.34 NR | Umajesty Williams; Philippines | 46.52 | Frederick Ramirez; Philippines | 46.63 |
| 800 m | Chhun Bunthorn; Cambodia | 1:52.91 | Lương Đức Phước; Vietnam | 1:53.34 | Wan Muhammad Fazri; Malaysia | 1:53.86 |
| 1,500 m | Kieran Tuntivate; Thailand | 3:58.51 | Lương Đức Phước; Vietnam | 3:59.31 | Wahyudi Putra; Indonesia | 3:59.36 |
| 5,000 m | Kieran Tuntivate; Thailand | 14:34.77 | Sonny Wagdos; Philippines | 14:36.45 | Robi Syianturi; Indonesia | 14:43.45 |
| 10,000 m | Rikki Marthin Simbolon; Indonesia | 31:08.85 | Soh Rui Yong; Singapore | 31:10.70 NR | Tan Htike Soe; Myanmar | 31:25.55 |
| 110 m hurdles | Natthaphon Dansungnoen; Thailand | 13.831 (Note: joint Gold Medal) | shared gold | – | John Cabang; Philippines | 13.86 |
| 110 m hurdles | Ang Chen Xiang; Singapore | 13.831 NR | shared gold | – | John Cabang; Philippines | 13.86 |
| 400 m hurdles | Eric Cray; Philippines | 50.03 | Natthaphon Dansungnoen; Thailand | 50.73 | Calvin Quek; Singapore | 50.75 |
| 3,000 m steeplechase | Nguyễn Trung Cường; Vietnam | 8:51.99 | Lê Tiến Long; Vietnam | 8:53.62 | Pandu Sukarya; Indonesia | 8:55.05 |
| 4 × 100 m relay | Indonesia; Lalu Muhammad Zohri; Bayu Kertanegara; Sudirman Hadi; Adith Rico Pradana | 39.11 | Thailand; Piyawat Aendu; Chayut Khongprasit; Muhamah Salaeh; Kobsit Sittichai | 39.13 | Malaysia; Jonathan Nyepa; Khairul Hafiz Jantan; Mohamad Eizlan Dahalan; Muhammad Arsyad Md Saat | 39.36 |
| 4 × 100 m relay | Indonesia; Lalu Muhammad Zohri; Bayu Kertanegara; Sudirman Hadi; Adith Rico Pradana | 39.11 | Thailand; Piyawat Aendu; Chayut Khongprasit; Muhamah Salaeh; Kobsit Sittichai | 39.13 | Singapore; Joshua Chua; Xander Ho; Marc Brian Louis; Mark Lee | 39.36 |
| 4 × 400 m relay | Philippines; Clinton Kingsley Bautista; Michael del Prado; Joyme Sequita; Umajesty Williams | 3:07.22 | Thailand; Jirateep Bundee; Apisit Chamsri; Thawatchai Khongjeam; Joshua Atkinson | 3:07.23 | Malaysia; Muhammad Firdaus Zemi; Ruslem Zikry Putra Roseli; Tharshan Shanmugam; Umar Osman | 3:08.82 |
| Marathon | Agus Prayogo; Indonesia | 2:32:59 | Arlan Arbois; Philippines | 2:33:27 | Hoàng Nguyên Thanh; Vietnam | 2:35:49 |
| 20 km race walk | Hendro Yap; Indonesia | 1:40:42 | Nguyễn Thành Ngưng; Vietnam | 1:45:36 | Pyae Phyo Htun; Myanmar | 1:49:39 |
| High jump | Tawan Kaeodam; Thailand | 2.27 m GR | Vũ Đức Anh; Vietnam | 2.17 m | Farell Glen Felix Jerus; Malaysia | 2.15 m |
| Pole vault | Ernest John Obiena; Philippines | 5.65 m GR | Kasinpob Chomchanad; Thailand | 5.20 m | Patsapong Amsam-ang; Thailand | 5.20 m |
| Long jump | Janry Ubas; Philippines | 7.85 m | Nguyễn Tiến Trọng; Vietnam | 7.66 m | Sapwaturrahman; Indonesia | 7.62 m |
| Triple jump | Andre Anura; Malaysia | 16.06 m | Ronnie Malipay; Philippines | 15.74 m | Mark Harry Diones; Philippines | 15.70 m |
| Shot put | Jakkapat Noisri; Thailand | 17.84 m | Phan Thanh Bình; Vietnam | 17.39 m | Muhammad Ziyad Zolkefli; Malaysia | 17.30 m |
| Discus throw | Irfan Shamsuddin; Malaysia | 57.83 m | Kiadpradid Srisai; Thailand | 51.89 m | Bandit Singhatongkul; Thailand | 50.02 m |
| Hammer throw | Kittipong Boonmawan; Thailand | 64.49 m | Jackie Wong; Malaysia | 64.20 m | Sadat Marzuqi Ajisan; Malaysia | 59.76 m |
| Javelin throw | Abdul Hafiz; Indonesia | 69.60 m | Nguyễn Hoài Văn; Vietnam | 69.55 m | Agustinus Abadi Ndiken; Indonesia | 66.20 m |
| Decathlon | Sutthisak Singkhon; Thailand | 7468 pts | Janry Ubas; Philippines | 6923 pts | Aries Toledo; Philippines | 6891 pts |

=== Women's events ===
| Event | Gold | | Silver | | Bronze | |
|---|---|---|---|---|---|---|
| 100 m | Shanti Pereira; Singapore | 11.41 | Supanich Poolkerd; Thailand | 11.58 | Trần Thị Nhi Yến; Vietnam | 11.75 |
| 200 m | Shanti Pereira; Singapore | 22.69 GR, NR | Trần Thị Nhi Yến; Vietnam | 23.54 | Zaidatul Husniah Zulkifli; Malaysia | 23.60 |
| 400 m | Shereen Samson Vallabouy; Malaysia | 52.53 | Nguyễn Thị Huyền; Vietnam | 53.27 | Nguyễn Thị Hằng; Vietnam | 53.84 |
| 800 m | Nguyễn Thị Thu Hà; Vietnam | 2:08.55 | Bùi Thị Ngân; Vietnam | 2:08.96 | Goh Chui Ling; Singapore | 2:09.15 |
| 1,500 m | Nguyễn Thị Oanh; Vietnam | 4:16.85 | Bùi Thị Ngân; Vietnam | 4:24.57 | Goh Chui Ling; Singapore | 4:26.33 NR |
| 5,000 m | Nguyễn Thị Oanh; Vietnam | 17:00.33 | Phạm Thị Hồng Lệ; Vietnam | 17:06.72 | Odekta Elvina Naibaho; Indonesia | 17:13.63 |
| 10,000 m | Nguyễn Thị Oanh; Vietnam | 35:11.53 | Phạm Thị Hồng Lệ; Vietnam | 35:21.09 | Odekta Elvina Naibaho; Indonesia | 35:31.03 |
| 100 m hurdles | Huỳnh Thị Mỹ Tiên; Vietnam | 13.50 | Bùi Thị Nguyên; Vietnam | 13.52 | Dina Aulia; Indonesia | 13.59 |
| 400 m hurdles | Nguyễn Thị Huyền; Vietnam | 56.29 | Robyn Lauren Brown; Philippines | 56.51 | Nguyễn Thị Ngọc; Vietnam | 59.09 |
| 3,000 m steeplechase | Nguyễn Thị Oanh; Vietnam | 10:34.37 | Joida Gagnao; Philippines | 10:40.96 | Nguyễn Thị Hương; Vietnam | 11:00.85 |
| 4 × 100 m relay | Thailand; Jirapat Khanonta; Sukanda Petraksa; Athicha Phetkun; Manatsada Sanmano | 44.24 | Vietnam; Hoàng Dư Ý Hà Thị Thu; Kha Thanh Trúc; Lê Tú Chinh | 44.51 | Malaysia; Azreen Nabila Alias; Nur Afrina Batrisyia; Nur Aishah Rofina Aling; Zaidatul Husniah Zulkifli | 44.58 NR |
| 4 × 400 m relay | Vietnam; Hoàng Thị Minh Hạnh; Nguyễn Thị Hằng; Nguyễn Thị Huyền; Nguyễn Thị Ngọc | 3:33.05 | Philippines; Bernalyn Bejoy; Robyn Lauren Brown; Jessel Lumapas; Maureen Schrijvers | 3:37.75 NR | Thailand; Sukanya Janchaona; Benny Nontanam; Sasipim Satachot; Arisa Weruwanarak | 3:39.29 |
| Marathon | Odekta Elvina Naibaho; Indonesia | 2:48:14 | Lê Thị Tuyết; Vietnam | 2:49:21 | Christine Hallasgo; Philippines | 2:50:27 |
| 20 km race walk | Nguyễn Thị Thanh Phúc; Vietnam | 1:55:02 | Violine Intan Puspita; Indonesia | 1:55:14 | Kotchaphon Tangsrivong; Thailand | 1:57:11 |
| High jump | Thanlada Thongchomphunut; Thailand | 1.79 m | Phạm Thị Diễm; Vietnam | 1.77 m | Michelle Sng Suat Li; Singapore | 1.73 m |
| Pole vault | Chonthicha Khabut; Thailand | 4.05 m | Nor Sarah Adi; Malaysia | 4.05 m | Natalie Uy; Philippines | 4.00 m |
| Long jump | Maria Natalia Londa; Indonesia | 6.28 m | Bùi Thị Thu Thảo; Vietnam | 6.13 m | Bùi Thị Loan; Vietnam | 6.02 m |
| Triple jump | Parinya Chuaimaroeng; Thailand | 13.60 m | Maria Natalia Londa; Indonesia | 13.50 m | Nguyễn Thị Hương; Vietnam | 13.46 m |
| Shot put | Areerat Intadis; Thailand | 16.71 m | Eki Febri Ekawati; Indonesia | 15.24 m | Nani Sahirah Maryata; Malaysia | 14.44 m |
| Discus throw | Subenrat Insaeng; Thailand | 57.69 m | Queenie Ting; Malaysia | 50.73 m | Lê Thị Cẩm Dung; Vietnam | 45.08 m |
| Hammer throw | Grace Wong; Malaysia | 61.87 m GR | Mingkamon Koomphon; Thailand | 57.86 m | Nurul Hidayah Lukman; Malaysia | 49.61 m |
| Javelin throw | Jariya Wichaidit; Thailand | 52.60 m | Gennah Malapit; Philippines | 49.55 m | Evalyn Palabrica; Philippines | 48.31 m |
| Heptathlon | Nguyễn Linh Na; Vietnam | 5403 pts | Sarah Dequinan; Philippines | 5369 pts | Sunisa Khotseemueang; Thailand | 5253 pts |

=== Mixed events ===
| Event | Gold | | Silver | | Bronze | |
|---|---|---|---|---|---|---|
| 4 × 400 m relay | Vietnam; Nguyễn Thị Hằng; Nguyễn Thị Huyền; Trần Đình Sơn; Trần Nhật Hoàng | 3:21.27 | Thailand; Joshua Atkinson; Benny Nontanam; Siripol Phanpae; Supanich Poolkerd | 3:23.02 | Philippines; Robyn Lauren Brown; Michael del Prado; Jessel Lumapas; Umajesty Williams | 3:23.69 |
