= List of SEA Games records in athletics =

The South East Asian Games is a biennial event which began in 1959 known as the Southeast Asian Peninsular Games. Athletics has been one of the sports held at the Games since the inaugural edition. Records are maintained by the Southeast Asian Games Federation and set by athletes who are representing one of the 11 countries of Southeast Asia.

== Men's records ==
Event	Record	Name	Nationality	Date	Games	Place	Ref.
100 m	9.94 (+0.7 m/s) NR	Puripol Boonson	Thailand	11 December 2025	2025 SEA Games	Bangkok, Thailand	
200 m	20.07 (+0.2 m/s) NR	Puripol Boonson	Thailand	13 December 2025	2025 SEA Games	Bangkok, Thailand	
400 m	45.13 NR	Joshua Robert Atkinson	Thailand	12 December 2025	2025 SEA Games	Bangkok, Thailand	
800 m	1:48.29	Samson Vellabouy	Malaysia	14 August 1989	1989 SEA Games	Kuala Lumpur, Malaysia	
1500 m	3:45.31 NR	Nguyễn Đình Cương	Vietnam	11 December 2007	2007 SEA Games	Nakhon Ratchasima, Thailand	
5000 m	14:04.82 NR	Nguyễn Văn Lai	Vietnam	9 June 2015	2015 SEA Games	Kallang, Singapore	
10,000 m	29:19.62	Eduardo Buenavista	Philippines	7 December 2003	2003 SEA Games	Hanoi, Vietnam	
Marathon	2:20:27.00	Eduardus Nabunome	Indonesia	19 October 1997	1997 SEA Games	Jakarta, Indonesia	
110 m hurdles	13.66 (+1.4 m/s) (Note: Internal Recovery Time. During the hurdle races in Thailand, the official timing provider experienced serious technical issues. There were massive failures affecting the power supply and the automatic scoring system. The primary, fully automatic electronic times (FAT) could not be processed directly as usual. The federation had to rely on video analysis and secondary backup systems to determine the rankings and times.)	John Cabang	Philippines	12 December 2025	2025 SEA Games	Bangkok, Thailand	
400 m hurdles	49.40	Eric Cray	Philippines	10 June 2015	2015 SEA Games	Kallang, Singapore	
3000 m steeplechase	8:40.77	Eduardo Buenavista	Philippines	12 December 2001	2001 SEA Games	Kuala Lumpur, Malaysia	
High jump	2.27 m	Tawan Kaeodam	Thailand	12 May 2023	2023 SEA Games	Phnom Penh, Cambodia	
Pole vault	5.70 m	EJ Obiena	Philippines	16 December 2025	2025 SEA Games	Bangkok, Thailand	
Pole vault	5.70 m NR	Patsapong Amsam-ang	Thailand	16 December 2025	2025 SEA Games	Bangkok, Thailand	
Long jump	8.03 m (+0.5 m/s)	Sapwaturrahman	Indonesia	7 December 2019	2019 SEA Games	New Clark City, Philippines	
Triple jump	16.77 m (+0.2 m/s); NR	Muhammad Hakimi Ismail	Malaysia	23 August 2017	2017 SEA Games	Bukit Jalil, Malaysia	
Shot put	18.14 m	William Morrison III	Philippines	15 May 2022	2021 SEA Games	Hanoi, Vietnam	
Discus throw	59.50 m	Wong Tuck Yim	Singapore	8 August 1999	1999 SEA Games	Bandar Seri Begawan, Brunei	
Hammer throw	67.56 m =NR	Kittipong Boonmawan	Thailand	7 December 2019	2019 SEA Games	New Clark City, Philippines	
Javelin throw	76.30 m	Peerachet Jantra	Thailand	17 December 2013	2013 SEA Games	Naypyidaw, Myanmar	
Decathlon	7603 pts NWI	Sutthisak Singkhon	Thailand	14–15 May 2022	2021 SEA Games	Hanoi, Vietnam	
Decathlon	100m / Long jump / Shot put / High jump / 400m / 110m H / Discus / Pole vault / Javelin / 1500m; 10.99 (+0.8 m/s) / 7.29 m (NWI) / 14.24 m / 1.95 m / 49.51 / 15.10 (+0.5 m/s) / 44.09 m / 4.30 m / 52.70 m / 4:52.63						
20,000 m walk (track)	1:32:11.27	Hendro Yap	Indonesia	22 August 2017	2017 SEA Games	Bukit Jalil, Malaysia	
20 km walk (road)	1:29:13	Harbans Singh Narinde	Malaysia	14 October 1997	1997 SEA Games	Jakarta, Indonesia	
4 × 100 m relay	38.28 NR	Thawatchai Hiemiat; Puripol Boonson; Chayut Khongprasit; Soraoat Dapbang	Thailand	15 December 2025	2025 SEA Games	Bangkok, Thailand	
4 × 400 m relay	3:03.07 NR	Sarawut Nuansri; Khunphat Kraichan; Jirayu Pleenaram; Joshua Robert Atkinson	Thailand	16 December 2025	2025 SEA Games	Bangkok, Thailand	

Key:
^{WR} World record	^{AR} Asian record	^{NR} National record	^{PB} Athlete's personal best

== Women's records ==
Event	Record	Name	Nationality	Date	Games	Place	Ref.
100 m	11.28 (+0.9 m/s)	Lydia De Vega	Philippines	16 September 1987	1987 SEA Games	Jakarta, Indonesia	
200 m	22.69 (−0.9 m/s) NR	Shanti Pereira	Singapore	8 May 2023	2023 SEA Games	Phnom Penh, Cambodia	
400 m	51.83 NR	Nguyễn Thị Tĩnh	Vietnam	8 December 2003	2003 SEA Games	Hanoi, Vietnam	
800 m	2:02.39	Trương Thanh Hằng	Vietnam	8 December 2007	2007 SEA Games	Nakhon Ratchasima, Thailand	
1500 m	4:11.60	Trương Thanh Hằng	Vietnam	7 December 2007	2007 SEA Games	Nakhon Ratchasima, Thailand	
5000 m	15:54.32	Triyaningsih	Indonesia	8 December 2007	2007 SEA Games	Nakhon Ratchasima, Thailand	
10,000 m	32:49.47	Triyaningsih	Indonesia	17 December 2009	2009 SEA Games	Vientiane, Laos	
Marathon	2:34:29	Ruwiyati	Indonesia	13 December 1995	1995 SEA Games	Chiang Mai, Thailand	
100 m hurdles	12.85 (+1.6 m/s)	Trecia Roberts	Thailand	9 August 1999	1999 SEA Games	Bandar Seri Begawan, Brunei	
400 m hurdles	56.06	Nguyễn Thị Huyền	Vietnam	22 August 2017	2017 SEA Games	Bukit Jalil, Malaysia	
3000 m steeplechase	9:52.46	Nguyễn Thị Oanh	Vietnam	15 May 2022	2021 SEA Games	Hanoi, Vietnam	
High jump	1.94 m	Noeng-ruthai Chaipech	Thailand	14 December 2009	2009 SEA Games	Vientiane, Laos	
Pole vault	4.35 m NR	Diva Renatta Jayadi	Indonesia	11 December 2025	2025 SEA Games	Bangkok, Thailand	
Long jump	6.71 m	Marestella Torres	Philippines	12 November 2011	2011 SEA Games	Palembang, Indonesia	
Triple jump	14.17 m (−0.7 m/s) NR	Maria Natalia Londa	Indonesia	17 December 2013	2013 SEA Games	Naypyidaw, Myanmar	
Shot put	18.20 m	Du Xianhui	Singapore	7 December 2003	2003 SEA Games	Hanoi, Vietnam	
Discus throw	60.33 m	Subenrat Insaeng	Thailand	9 December 2019	2019 SEA Games	New Clark City, Philippines	
Hammer throw	65.41 m NR	Grace Wong Xiu Mei	Malaysia	12 December 2025	2025 SEA Games	Bangkok, Thailand	
Javelin throw	56.37 m NR	Lò Thị Hoàng	Vietnam	18 May 2022	2021 SEA Games	Hanoi, Vietnam	
Heptathlon	5889 pts	Wassana Winatho	Thailand	11 December 2007	2007 SEA Games	Nakhon Ratchasima, Thailand	
20 km walk (road)	1:37.08	Nguyễn Thị Thanh Phúc	Vietnam	15 December 2013	2013 SEA Games	Naypyidaw, Myanmar	
4 × 100 m relay	43.88 NR	Lê Thị Mộng Tuyền; Đỗ Thị Quyên; Trần Thị Yến Hoa; Lê Tú Chinh	Vietnam	25 August 2017	2017 SEA Games	Kuala Lumpur, Malaysia	
4 × 400 m relay	3:31.46 NR	Nguyễn Thị Oanh; Nguyễn Thị Thúy; Quách Thị Lan; Nguyễn Thị Huyền	Vietnam	11 June 2015	2015 SEA Games	Kallang, Singapore	

Key:
^{WR} World record	^{AR} Asian record	^{NR} National record	^{PB} Athlete's personal best

== Mixed records ==
Event	Record	Name	Nationality	Date	Games	Place	Ref.
4 × 100 m relay	41.67 NR	Eloiza Luzon; Anfernee Lopena; Kristina Knott; Eric Cray	Philippines	8 December 2019	2019 SEA Games	New Clark City, Philippines	
4 × 400 m relay	3:19.29	Siripol Punpa; Supanich Poolkerd; Joshua Atkinson; Benny Nontanam	Thailand	14 May 2022	2021 SEA Games	Hanoi, Vietnam	

Key:
^{WR} World record	^{AR} Asian record	^{NR} National record	^{PB} Athlete's personal best

== Record holders' rankings ==
=== By nation ===
Nation	Men	Women	Mixed	Record Tally
Thailand	9	4	1	14
Vietnam	2	9	0	11
Philippines	6	2	1	9
Indonesia	3	5	0	8
Malaysia	3	1	0	4
Singapore	1	2	0	3
Total	24	23	2	49

== See also ==
- Athletics at the Southeast Asian Games
- List of Southeast Asian Games medalists in athletics
