= Athletics at the 2015 SEA Games – Men's 400 metres =

Men's 400 metres competition

Athletics – Men's 200 metres at the 2015 SEA Games
- Venue: Nation stadium
- Date: 12 June 2015
- Competitors: 10 from 6 nations

Medalists
gold medal	Kunanon Sukkaew	Thailand
silver medal	Quach Cong Lich	Vietnam
bronze medal	Edgardo Alejan Jr.	Philippines

The men's 400 metres competition of the athletics event at the 2015 SEA Games was held on 12 June at the National Stadium in Singapore.

== Records ==
Prior to this competition, the existing Asian and Games records were as follows:

Asian record	Yousef Ahmed Masrahi (KSA)	44.43	Lausanne, Switzerland	3 July 2014
Games record	Aktawat Sakoolchan (THA)	46.05	Chiang Mai, Thailand	10 December 1995

The following records were established during the competition:

Date	Event	Name	Nationality	Time	Record
12 June 2015	Men's 400 metres	Kunanon Sukkaew	THA	46.00	Games Record

== Schedule ==
All times are Singapore Standard Time (UTC+08:00)

Date	Time	Event
Saturday, 12 June 2015	9:40	Heat 1
Saturday, 12 June 2015	9:50	Heat 2
Saturday, 12 June 2015	16:50	Final

== Results ==
=== Round 1 ===
Source: Results Summary

- Qualification: First 3 in each heat (Q) and the next 2 fastest (q) advance to the final.

==== Heat 1 ====
Source: Results Heat 1

Rank	Athlete	Time	Notes
1	Quach Cong Lich (VIE)	47.68	Q
2	Mohamad Arif Zulhilmi Alet (MAS)	47.80	Q
3	Ng Chin Hui (SIN)	48.76	Q
4	Archand Christian Bagsit (PHI)	48.78	
5	Domingos Savio Dos Santos (TLS)	50.79	

==== Heat 2 ====
Source: Results Heat 2

Rank	Athlete	Time	Notes
1	Edgardo Alejan Jr. (PHI)	47.62	Q
2	Zubin Muncherji (SIN)	47.71	Q, SB
3	Luong Van Thao (VIE)	47.82	Q
4	Kunanon Sukkaew (THA)	47.92	q
5	Dinesh Krishnan (MAS)	48.22	q

=== Final ===
Source: Result Final

Rank	Athlete	Time	Notes	
1st place, gold medalist(s)	Kunanon Sukkaew (THA)	46.00	GR	Video on YouTube Official Video
2nd place, silver medalist(s)	Quach Cong Lich (VIE)	46.02	PB	Video on YouTube Official Video
3rd place, bronze medalist(s)	Edgardo Alejan Jr. (PHI)	47.08	SB	Video on YouTube Official Video
4	Luong Van Thao (VIE)	47.16	PB	Video on YouTube Official Video
5	Mohamad Arif Zulhilmi Alet (MAS)	47.43		Video on YouTube Official Video
6	Zubin Muncherji (SIN)	47.87		Video on YouTube Official Video
7	Ng Chin Hui (SIN)	48.83		Video on YouTube Official Video
8	Dinesh Krishnan (MAS)	49.04		Video on YouTube Official Video

== See also ==
- Official website
