= Athletics at the 2015 SEA Games – Men's 5000 metres =

The men's 5000 metres at the 2015 SEA Games was held in National Stadium, Singapore. The track and field events took place on June 9.

== Schedule ==
All times are (UTC+08:00)

| Date | Time | Event |
|---|---|---|
| Tuesday, 9 June 2015 | 16:35 | Final |

== Records ==
Prior to this competition, the existing world, Asian, and Southeast Asian Games records were as follows.

| World Record | Kenenisa Bekele (ETH) | 12:37.35 | Hengelo, Netherlands | 31 May 2004 |
| Asian Record | Albert Rop (BHR) | 12:51.96 | Fontvieille, Monaco | 19 July 2013 |
| Games Record | Murusamy Ramachandran (MAS) | 14:08.97 | Singapore | 15 June 1993 |

The following new record were set during this competition.

| Date | Event | Athlete | Time | Records |
|---|---|---|---|---|
| 9 June | Final | Nguyen Van Lai (VIE) | 14:04.82 | GR |

== Results ==
Legend

- SB — Seasonal Best
- PB — Personal Best
- GR — Games Record

| Rank | Athlete | Time | Note |
|---|---|---|---|
| 1st place, gold medalist(s) | Nguyen Van Lai (VIE) | 14:04.82 | GR |
| 2nd place, silver medalist(s) | Agus Prayogo (INA) | 14:15.14 | SB |
| 3rd place, bronze medalist(s) | Sanchai Namkhet (THA) | 14:40.59 | PB |
| 4 | Do Quoc Luat (VIE) | 14:56.00 | |
| 5 | Nattawut Innum (THA) | 14:57.55 | PB |
| 6 | San Naing (MYA) | 15:13.83 | SB |
| 7 | Melvin Wong Yan Hao (SIN) | 16:01.58 | |
| 8 | Jeevaneesh Soundararajah (SIN) | 16:14.75 | |
| 9 | Viro Ma (CAM) | 16:18.80 | |
| 10 | Sopeak Phan (CAM) | 16:44.38 | PB |
