= Athletics at the 2017 SEA Games =

- Venue: Bukit Jalil National Stadium; Putrajaya (marathon)
- Date: 19–26 August 2017
- Nations: 11

The athletics competitions at the 2017 SEA Games in Kuala Lumpur took place at Bukit Jalil National Stadium in Bukit Jalil. The marathon event meanwhile, was held in Putrajaya.

The 2017 Games featured competitions in forty-five events (23 events for men and 22 events for women).

== Events ==
The following events were contested (all distances are in metres unless stated):

- Track: 100, 200, 400, 800, 1500, 1500, 5000, 10000, 100 Hurdles (women), 110 Hurdles (men), 3000 Steeplechase, 4×100 Relay, and 4×400 Relay;
- Road: Marathon, 10 kilometres walk (women), and 20 kilometres walk (men);
- Field: High jump, Pole vault, Long jump, Triple jump, Shot put, Discus throw, Hammer throw, and Javelin throw;
- Combined: Decathlon (men) and Heptathlon (women)

== Participation ==
=== Participating nations ===
- Brunei (5)
- Cambodia (6)
- Indonesia (27)
- Laos (12)
- Malaysia (63)
- Myanmar (11)
- Philippines (38)
- Singapore (29)
- Thailand (79)
- Timor-Leste (4)
- Vietnam (50)

== Medal summary ==
=== Medal table ===
* Host nation (Malaysia)

Rank	Nation	Gold	Silver	Bronze	Total
1	Vietnam (VIE)	17	11	6	34
2	Thailand (THA)	9	13	11	33
3	Malaysia (MAS)*	8	8	9	25
4	Indonesia (INA)	5	7	3	15
5	Philippines (PHI)	5	3	10	18
6	Singapore (SGP)	2	2	4	8
7	Laos (LAO)	0	0	1	1
7	Myanmar (MYA)	0	0	1	1
Totals (8 entries)		46	44	45	135

=== Men's events ===
Key
GR	SEA Games record	NR	National record

Event	Gold		Silver		Bronze	
100 m	Khairul Hafiz Jantan; Malaysia	10.38	Eric Cray; Philippines	10.43	Kritsada Namsuwun; Thailand	10.43
200 m	Trenten Beram; Philippines	20.84 NR	Jirapong Meenapra; Thailand	21.22	Aravinn Thevarr Gunasegaran; Malaysia	21.26
400 m	Trenten Beram; Philippines	46.39	Phitchaya Sunthonthuam; Thailand	46.46	Quách Công Lịch; Vietnam	46.48
800 m	Dương Văn Thái; Vietnam	1:48.97 NR	Marco Vilog; Philippines	1:49.91	Royson Vincent; Malaysia	1:50.76
1500 m	Dương Văn Thái; Vietnam	3:51.44	Yothin Yaprajan; Thailand	3:53.41	Mervin Guarte; Philippines	3:53.68
5000 m	Nguyễn Văn Lai; Vietnam	14:55.15	Prabudass Krishnan; Malaysia	14:57.43	Agus Prayogo; Indonesia	15:01.80
10,000 m	Agus Prayogo; Indonesia	30:22.26	Nguyễn Văn Lai; Vietnam	30:45.64	Sanchai Namkhet; Thailand	30:54.86
110 m hurdles	Rayzam Shah Wan Sofian; Malaysia	13.83	Jamras Rittidet; Thailand	14.10	Clinton Bautista; Philippines	14.15
400 m hurdles	Eric Cray; Philippines	50.03	Quách Công Lịch; Vietnam	50.05 NR	Andrian; Indonesia	51.52
3000 m steeplechase	Atjong Tio Purwanto; Indonesia	9:03.94	Phạm Tiến Sản; Vietnam	9:06.31	Đỗ Quốc Luật; Vietnam	9:08.72
4 × 100 m relay	Thailand; Bandit Chuangchai; Jaran Sathoengram; Kritsada Namsuwun; Jirapong Meenapra	38.90 GR	Indonesia; Muhammad Fadlin; Iswandi; Eko Rimbawan; Yaspi Boby	39.05 NR	Philippines; Anfernee Lopena; Archand Bagsit; Eric Cray; Trenten Beram	39.11 NR
4 × 400 m relay	Thailand; Kunanon Sukkaew; Nattapong Kongkraphan; Jirayu Pleenaram; Phitchaya Sunthonthuam	3:07.25	Vietnam; Lương Văn Thao; Phan Khắc Hoàng; Trần Đình Sơn; Quách Công Lịch	3:07.40 NR	Philippines; Edgardo Alejan, Jr. Michael Carlo del Prado; Archand Bagsit; Aries Toledo	3:08.42
Marathon	Soh Rui Yong; Singapore	2:29:27	Agus Prayogo; Indonesia	2:31:20	Muhaizar Mohamad; Malaysia	2:31:52
20 km walk (track)	Hendro Yap; Indonesia	1:32:11 GR	Lo Choon Sieng; Malaysia	1:32:28	Muhammad Khairil Harith Harun; Malaysia	1:34:04
High jump	Nauraj Singh Randhawa; Malaysia	2.24 m =GR	Lee Hup Wei; Malaysia	2.24 m =GR	Nguyễn Thành Nhân; Vietnam	2.18 m
Pole vault	Porranot Purahong; Thailand	5.35 m GR, =NR	Patsapong Amsamang; Thailand	5.30 m	Iskandar Alwi; Malaysia	5.25 m NR
Long jump	Bùi Văn Đông; Vietnam	7.83 m NR	Suwandi Wijaya; Indonesia	7.78 m	Janry Ubas; Philippines	7.75 m
Triple jump	Hakimi Ismail; Malaysia	16.77 m GR, NR	Mark Harry Diones; Philippines	16.63 m	Pratchaya Tepparak; Thailand	16.37 m
Shot put	Promrob Juntima; Thailand	17.42 m	Thawat Khachin; Thailand	17.15 m	Muhammad Ziyad Zolkefli; Malaysia	17.12 m
Discus throw	Irfan Shamshuddin; Malaysia	58.36 m	Narong Benjaroon; Thailand	50.54 m	Abdul Rahman Lee; Malaysia	44.80 m
Hammer throw	Jackie Wong Siew Cheer; Malaysia	65.90 m GR	Kittipong Boonmawan; Thailand	65.49 m NR	Arniel Ferrera; Philippines	55.94 m
Javelin throw	Peerachet Jantra; Thailand	71.49 m	Abdul Hafiz; Indonesia	69.30 m	Melvin Calano; Philippines	65.94 m
Decathlon	Aries Toledo; Philippines	7433 pts NR	Sutthisak Singkhon; Thailand	7411 pts	Bùi Văn Sự; Vietnam	6737 pts

=== Women's events ===
Key
GR	Southeast Asian Games record	NR	National record

Event	Gold		Silver		Bronze	
100 m	Lê Tú Chinh; Vietnam	11.56	Zaidatul Husniah Zulkifli; Malaysia	11.74	Veronica Shanti Pereira; Singapore	11.76
200 m	Lê Tú Chinh; Vietnam	23.32	Zaidatul Husniah Zulkifli; Malaysia	23.64	Veronica Shanti Pereira; Singapore	23.68
400 m	Nguyễn Thị Huyền; Vietnam	52.48	Dipna Lim Prasad; Singapore	54.18 NR	Supanich Poolkerd; Thailand	54.55
800 m	Vũ Thị Ly; Vietnam	2:07.11	Khuất Phương Anh; Vietnam	2:09.05	Swe Li Myint; Myanmar	2:12.31
1500 m	Nguyễn Thị Oanh; Vietnam	4:20.51	Vũ Thị Ly; Vietnam	4:30.68	Lodkeo Inthakoumman; Laos	4:37.24 NR
5000 m	Nguyễn Thị Oanh; Vietnam	17:23.20	Phạm Thị Huệ; Vietnam	17:33.45	Triyaningsih; Indonesia	17:36.98
10,000 m	Triyaningsih; Indonesia	36:39.37	Phạm Thị Huệ; Vietnam	36:54.02	Phạm Thị Hồng Lệ; Vietnam	37:06.64
100 m hurdles	Trần Thị Yến Hoa; Vietnam	13.40	Raja Nursheena Azhar; Malaysia	13.92	Nur Izlyn Zaini; Singapore	14.14 =NR
400 m hurdles	Nguyễn Thị Huyền; Vietnam	56.06 GR, NR	Dipna Lim Prasad; Singapore	1:00.55	Jutamas Khonkham; Thailand	1:00.73
4 × 100 m relay	Vietnam; Lê Thị Mộng Tuyền; Đỗ Thị Quyên; Trần Thị Yến Hoa; Lê Tú Chinh	43.88 GR, NR	Thailand; Parichat Charoensuk; Kanyarat Pakdee; Supawan Thipat; Tassaporn Wannakit	44.62	Philippines; Eloisa Luzon; Kayla Anise Richardson; Kyla Ashley Richardson; Zion Corrales Nelson	44.81 NR
4 × 400 m relay	Vietnam; Nguyễn Thị Oanh; Quách Thị Lan; Hoàng Thị Ngọc; Nguyễn Thị Huyền	3:33.40	Thailand; Pornpan Hoemhuk; Atchima Eng-chuan; Treewadee Yongphan; Supanich Poolkerd	3:38.95	Malaysia; Nurul Faizah Asma' Mazlan; Shereen Samson Vallabuoy; Tanalaksiumy Rayer; Fathin Faqihah Yusuf	3:43.31
Marathon	Mary Joy Reyes Tabal; Philippines	2:48:26	Hoàng Thị Thanh; Vietnam	2:55:43	Natthaya Thanaronnawat; Thailand	2:58:17
10 km walk (track)	Elena Goh Ling Yin; Malaysia	52:21.50	Phan Thị Bích Hà; Vietnam	52:27.78	Tanaphon Assawawongcharoen; Thailand	53:17.10
High jump	Dương Thị Việt Anh; Vietnam	1.83 m	shared gold		Yap Sean Yee; Malaysia	1.83 m NR
High jump	Michelle Sng Suat Li; Singapore	1.83 m	shared gold		Yap Sean Yee; Malaysia	1.83 m NR
Pole vault	Chayanisa Chomchuendee; Thailand	4.10 m	Chuah Yu Tian; Malaysia	3.80 m	Rachel Isabel Yang Bingjie; Singapore	3.60 m
Long jump	Bùi Thị Thu Thảo; Vietnam	6.68 m NR	Maria Natalia Londa; Indonesia	6.47 m	Marestella Sunang; Philippines	6.45 m
Triple jump	Vũ Thị Mến; Vietnam	14.15 m NR	Maria Natalia Londa; Indonesia	13.52 m	Parinya Chuaimaroeng; Thailand	13.32 m
Shot put	Eki Febri Ekawati; Indonesia	15.39 m	Areerat Intadis; Thailand	15.33 m	Sawitri Thongchao; Thailand	14.26 m
Discus throw	Subenrat Insaeng; Thailand	55.23 m	Choo Kang Ni; Malaysia	47.91 m NR	Nguyễn Thị Hồng Thương; Vietnam	45.10 m
Hammer throw	Grace Wong Xiu Mei; Malaysia	59.24 m GR	Mingkamon Koomphon; Thailand	56.15 m	Panwat Gimsrang; Thailand	54.88 m
Javelin throw	Natta Nachan; Thailand	55.04 m	Bùi Thị Xuân; Vietnam	52.50 m NR	Evalyn Palabrica; Philippines	47.21 m
Heptathlon	Sunisa Khotseemueang; Thailand	5430 pts	Emilia Nova; Indonesia	5386 pts NR	Wassana Winatho; Thailand	5288 pts

== See also ==
- Athletics at the 2017 ASEAN Para Games
