= Athletics at the 2013 SEA Games – Men's javelin throw =

The men's hammer throw at the 2013 SEA Games, the athletics was held in Naypyidaw, Myanmar. The track and field events is taking place at the Wunna Theikdi Stadiumon December 17.

== Schedule ==
All times are Myanmar Standard Time (UTC+06:30)

Date	Time	Event
Tuesday, 17 December 2013	14:30	Final

== Records ==
Prior to this competition, the existing world, Asian, and Southeast Asian Games records were as follows.

World Record	Jan Železný (CZE)	98.48	Jena, Germany	25 May 1996
Asian Record	Kazuhiro Mizoguchi (JPN)	87.60	San Jose, United States	27 May 1989
Games Record	Frans Mahuse (INA)	75.38	Jakarta, Indonesia	15 September 1987

== Results ==
Legend

- X — Failure

Rank	Athlete	Attempts						Result	Notes
Rank	Athlete	1	2	3	4	5	6	Result	Notes
1st place, gold medalist(s)	Peerachet Jantra (THA)	?	?	?	?	?	?	76.30	GR, NR
2nd place, silver medalist(s)	Hussadin Rodmanee (THA)	?	?	?	?	?	?	75.43	
3rd place, bronze medalist(s)	Nguyen Truong Giang (VIE)	?	?	?	?	?	?	69.69	
4	Agustinus Mahuze (INA)	?	?	?	?	?	?	66.91	
5	Danilo Fresnido (PHI)	?	?	?	?	?	?	66.32	
6	Kyaw Swar Moe (MYA)	?	?	?	?	?	?	60.59	
7	Kyaw Nyi Nyi Htwe (MYA)	?	?	?	?	?	?	57.90	
