= Nauraj Singh Randhawa =

Malaysian high jumper

Personal information
- Born: 27 January 1992 (age 34) Johor Bahru, Malaysia
- Height: 1.91 m (6 ft 3 in)
- Weight: 70 kg (154 lb)

Sport
- Country: Malaysia
- Sport: Athletics
- Event: High jump

Achievements and titles
- Personal best: 2.30 m (2017)
Medal record
Men's athletics
Representing Malaysia
Southeast Asian Games
Gold medal – first place	2017 Kuala Lumpur	High Jump
Gold medal – first place	2015 Singapore	High Jump
Gold medal – first place	2013 Naypyidaw	High Jump
Silver medal – second place	2019 Philippines	High Jump
Silver medal – second place	2021 Hanoi	High Jump

Nauraj Singh Randhawa (Punjabi: ਨੌਰਾਜ ਸਿੰਘ ਰੰਧਾਵਾ (Nauraja sigha radhāvā); born 27 January 1992) is a Malaysian athlete, specialising in the high jump.

== Athletics career ==
He won the gold medal in the 2013 and 2015 Southeast Asian Games. In 2016, he jumped 2.29 m in Kallang, Singapore. In 2017, he beat the 2.30 mark in Singapore, improving his personal best. With this record he became the first track and field athlete to reach the Olympics without a wild card since the 2008 Beijing Olympics when Lee Hup Wei, Roslinda Samsu and Yuan Yufang qualified on merit.
