= Robyn Lauren Brown =

Filipino-American hurdler (born 1994)

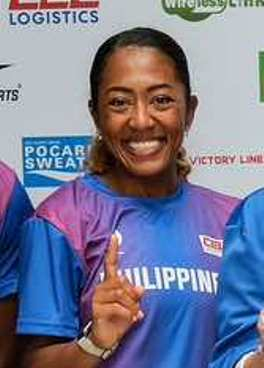
- Brown in 2024

Personal information
- Full name: Robyn Lauren Crisostomo Brown
- Nationality: Philippines; United States
- Born: July 27, 1994 (age 32)
- Height: 1.63 m (5 ft 4 in)

Sport
- Country: Philippines
- Sport: Track and field
- Event: 400 metres hurdles
- College team: University of Hawaiʻi at Mānoa
Medal record
Representing Philippines
Women's athletics
Event	1st	2nd	3rd
Asian Athletics Championships	1	0	0
Southeast Asian Games	0	3	7
Total	1	3	7
Asian Athletics Championships
Gold medal – first place	2023 Bangkok	400m hurdles
Southeast Asian Games
Silver medal – second place	2025 Thailand	400m hurdles
Silver medal – second place	2023 Cambodia	400m hurdles
Silver medal – second place	2023 Cambodia	4×400 m relay
Bronze medal – third place	2025 Thailand	Women's 4x400m Relay
Bronze medal – third place	2019 Philippines	400m hurdles
Bronze medal – third place	2019 Philippines	4×400 m relay
Bronze medal – third place	2019 Philippines	4×400 m relay (mixed)
Bronze medal – third place	2021 Vietnam	400m hurdles
Bronze medal – third place	2021 Vietnam	4×400 m relay
Bronze medal – third place	2023 Cambodia	4×400 m relay (mixed)

Robyn Lauren Crisostomo Brown (born July 27, 1994) is a Filipino-American hurdler competing for the Philippines, who was the gold medalist of the 400m hurdles event at the 2023 Asian Athletics Championships.

== Education ==
Brown graduated from Ruben S. Ayala High School in Chino Hills, California in 2012 and attended Mt. San Antonio College in Walnut, California for two years. She was a member of the Hawaii Rainbow Wahine track and field team at the University of Hawaiʻi at Mānoa, and graduated in 2017 with a Bachelor of Arts in Interdisciplinary Studies.

== Career ==
Brown has competed for the Philippines at the Southeast Asian Games. She competed in the women's 400m hurdles. She won bronze in both the 2019 and 2021 editions in the Philippines and Vietnam. At the 2023 edition in Cambodia, she won a silver. Here she broke the 30-year Philippine record previously set by Elma Muros Posadas.

At the 2023 Asian Athletics Championships in Bangkok, Brown clinched a gold medal in the women's 400m hurdles. This ended the gold medal drought for the Philippines, with the last one won by a Filipina being the women's long jump medal attained by Marestella Torres-Sunang in 2009.

== Personal life ==
Brown came from a family of medical workers. Her father is American and her mother is Filipino. Her father Kurtis Brown was a former respiratory therapist while her mother Susana Crisostomo is a nurse in Los Angeles.

== Filmography ==
=== Web shows ===
Year	Title	Role	Notes	Ref.
2025	Physical: Asia	Contestant	Team Philippines	
