= Boonthung Srisung =

Thai long-distance runner

Personal information
- Nationality: Thai
- Born: 30 May 1981 (age 45) Buriram Province, Thailand
- Height: 171 cm (5 ft 7 in)
- Weight: 59 kg (130 lb)

Sport
- Sport: Athletics
- Event: Marathon
Medal record
Men's Track and field
Representing Thailand
Southeast Asian Games
Gold medal – first place	2007 Nakhon Ratchasima	5000m
Gold medal – first place	2007 Nakhon Ratchasima	10,000m
Silver medal – second place	2009 Vientiane	5000m
Silver medal – second place	2013 Naypyidaw	5000m
Silver medal – second place	2013 Naypyidaw	10,000m
Silver medal – second place	2015 Singapore	10,000m
Silver medal – second place	2015 Singapore	Marathon
Bronze medal – third place	2007 Nakhon Ratchasima	1500m
Bronze medal – third place	2009 Vientiane	10,000m

Boonthung Srisung (Thai: บุญถึง ศรีสังข์; Thai nickname: Tay; born 30 May 1981) is a Thai long-distance runner. Srisung graduated from the Institute of Physical Education in Sukhothai, Thailand, and is currently coached by Nikorn Kansong.

He qualified for the 2016 Summer Olympics in Rio de Janeiro, and represented Thailand in the men's marathon. He finished in 133rd place with a time of 2:37.46. He was the flag bearer for Thailand during the closing ceremony.

At the 2013 Southeast Asian Games, he won silver medals in both 5000 metres and 10,000 metres.

== Personal bests ==
Outdoor

- 1500m – 3:52.80 (Incheon 2005)
- 3000m – 8:17.89 (Bangkok 2007)
- 5000m – 14:10.56 (Izmir 2005)
- 10,000m – 29:29.59 (Manila 2005)
- 3000m Steeplechase - 9:24.25 (Chiang Rai 2018)
- Half Marathon – 1:07:35 (Sydney 2006)
- Marathon – 2:24:01 (Houston 2016)

Indoor

- 3000m – 8:10.39 (Bangkok 2005)
