= Athletics at the 2025 SEA Games =

Track and field events in Bangkok

- Venue: Suphachalasai Stadium
- Date: 11–16 December
- Competitors: 345 from 10 nations

Athletics at the 2025 SEA Games in Bangkok took place from 11 to 16 December 2025, featuring a total of 47 medal events across two distinct sets: track and field and road running. The main venue, Suphachalasai Stadium was used for track and field and road running.

== Participating countries ==
- Cambodia (6) (Withdrew)
- Indonesia (30)
- Laos (9)
- Malaysia (49)
- Myanmar (15)
- Philippines (61)
- Singapore (39)
- Timor-Leste (6)
- Thailand (80) (Host)
- Vietnam (50)

== Medal table ==
* Host nation (Thailand)

Rank	Nation	Gold	Silver	Bronze	Total
1	Thailand*	13	13	4	30
2	Vietnam	12	12	10	34
3	Indonesia	9	5	6	20
4	Philippines	5	7	19	31
5	Malaysia	5	5	6	16
6	Singapore	3	3	3	9
7	Myanmar	0	2	0	2
Totals (7 entries)		47	47	48	142

== Medalists ==
Key
GR	SEA Games record	NR	National record

=== Men's events ===
Event	Gold		Silver		Bronze	
100 m	Puripol Boonson; Thailand	10.00	Lalu Muhammad Zohri; Indonesia	10.25	Danish Iftikhar Muhammad Roslee; Malaysia	10.26
200 m	Puripol Boonson; Thailand	20.07 GR, NR	Marc Brian Louis; Singapore	20.72 NR	Danish Iftikhar Muhammad Roslee; Malaysia	20.73 NR
400 m	Joshua Robert Atkinson; Thailand	45.13 GR, NR	Tạ Ngọc Tưởng; Vietnam	45.53 NR	Lê Ngọc Phúc; Vietnam	46.21
800 m	Hussein Loraña; Philippines	1:48.80	Joshua Robert Atkinson; Thailand	1:49.24	Wan Muhammad Fazri Wan Zahari; Malaysia	1:49.85
1,500 m	Kieran Tuntivate; Thailand	3:47.50	Wahyudi Putra; Indonesia	3:49.03	Lương Đức Phước; Vietnam	3:50.13
5,000 m	Kieran Tuntivate; Thailand	14:46.38	Yacine Guermali; Philippines	14:47.33	Sonny Wagdos; Philippines	14:48.01
10,000 m	Kieran Tuntivate; Thailand	29:41.81	Yacine Guermali; Philippines	29:43.94	Rikki Marthin Luther Simbolon; Indonesia	29:54.64
110 m hurdles	John Cabang; Philippines	13.66 GR	Ang Chen Xiang; Singapore	13.75	Mohamad Armin Zahryl Abdul Lattif; Malaysia	13.85
400 m hurdles	Calvin Quek; Singapore	50.27	Nguyễn Đức Sơn; Vietnam	50.80	Lê Quốc Huy; Vietnam	50.91
3,000 m steeplechase	Nguyễn Trung Cường; Vietnam	8:55.32	Pandu Sukarya; Indonesia	8:57.13	Junel Gobotia; Philippines	8:58.34
4×100 m relay	Thailand; Thawatchai Hiemiat; Puripol Boonson; Chayut Khongprasit; Soraoat Dapbang	38.28 GR, NR	Malaysia; Jonathan Nyepa; Danish Iftikhar Muhammad Roslee; Pengiran Aidil Auf Hajam; Aliff Iman Mohd Fahimi	39.03 'NR	Indonesia; Wahyu Setiawan; Lalu Muhammad Zohri; Fatah Sidik Jaelani; Bayu Kertanegara	39.51
4×400 m relay	Thailand; Sarawut Nuansi; Khunaphat Kaijan; Jirayu Pleenaram; Joshua Robert Atkinson	3:03.07	Vietnam; Trần Nhật Hoàng; Tạ Ngọc Tưởng; Vũ Ngọc Khánh; Lê Ngọc Phúc	3:03.85	Singapore; Thiruben Thana Rajan; Zubin Percy Muncherji; Reuben Rainer Lee; Calvin Quek	3:10.74
Marathon	Robi Syianturi; Indonesia	02:27:33	Arlan Arbois Jr. Philippines	02:30:19	Richard Salaño; Philippines	02:31:29
20 km race walk	Hendro Yap; Indonesia	01:35:25	Naing Lin Tun; Myanmar	01:37:55	Nguyễn Thành Ngưng; Vietnam	01:37:57
High jump	Tawan Kaoedam; Thailand	2.22 m	Kampton Kam; Singapore	2.19 m	Leonard Grospe; Philippines	2.19 m
Pole vault	Ernest John Obiena; Philippines	5.70 m =GR	Patsapong Amsam-ang; Thailand	5.70 m =GR, NR	Elijah Kevin Cole; Philippines	5.20 m
Long jump	Andre Anura; Malaysia	7.71 m	Janry Ubas; Philippines	7.64 m	Andrew George Medina; Singapore	7.53 m
Triple jump	Hồ Trọng Mạnh Hùng; Vietnam	16.33 m	Andre Anura; Malaysia	16.29 m	Gabriel Lee Jing Yi; Singapore	16.09 m NR
Shot put	Jonah Chang Rigan; Malaysia	18.78 m	Thongchai Silamool; Thailand	16.80 m	William Morrison III; Philippines	16.66 m
Discus throw	Irfan Shamsuddin; Malaysia	60.23 m	Srisai Kiadpradid; Thailand	53.82 m	Russel Ricafort, Jr; Philippines	53.34 m
Hammer throw	Kittipong Boonmawan; Thailand	63.11 m	Sadat Marzuqi Ajisan; Malaysia	60.15 m	Jackie Wong Siew Cheer; Malaysia	59.81 m
Javelin throw	Abdul Hafiz; Indonesia	72.82 m	Silfanus Ndiken; Indonesia	71.99 m	Wachirawit Sornwichai; Thailand	69.62 m
Decathlon	Hokett Delos Santos; Philippines	6,917 pts	Sutthisak Singkhon; Thailand	6,649 pts	Idan Fauzan Richsan; Indonesia	6,582 pts

=== Women's events ===
Event	Gold		Silver		Bronze	
100 m	Veronica Shanti Pereira; Singapore	11.36	Jirapat Khanonta; Thailand	11.54	Hà Thị Thu; Vietnam	11.58
200 m	Veronica Shanti Pereira; Singapore	23.05	Lê Thị Cẩm Tú; Vietnam	23.14 NR	Zion Rose Nelson; Philippines	23.50
400 m	Nguyễn Thị Ngọc; Vietnam	52.74	Chinenye Josephine Onuorah; Thailand	52.93	Jeralyn Rodriguez; Philippines	53.40
800 m	Naomi Marjorie Cesar; Philippines	2:10.2	Hà Thị Thu; Vietnam	2:10.3	Bernalyn Bejoy; Philippines	2:10.6
1,500 m	Bùi Thị Ngân; Vietnam	4:27.34	Nguyễn Khánh Linh; Vietnam	4:29.76	Susan Ramadan; Philippines	4:38.74
5,000 m	Nguyễn Thị Oanh; Vietnam	16:27.13	Lê Thị Tuyết; Vietnam	16:34.06	Joida Gagnao; Philippines	17:09.87
10,000 m	Nguyễn Thị Oanh; Vietnam	34:27.93	Lê Thị Tuyết; Vietnam	34:35.26	Odekta Elvina Naibaho; Indonesia	35:33.23
100 m hurdles	Dina Aulia; Indonesia	13.21	Emilia Nova; Indonesia	13.27	Huỳnh Thị Mỹ Tiên; Vietnam	13.43
400 m hurdles	Quách Thị Lan; Vietnam	56.82	Robyn Lauren Brown; Philippines	57.50	Lauren Hoffman; Philippines	57.75
3,000 m steeplechase	Nguyễn Thị Oanh; Vietnam	10:13.74	Đoàn Thu Hằng; Vietnam	10:50.30	Jessa Mae Roda; Philippines	10:55.68
4×100 m relay	Thailand; Manatsada Sanmano; Sukanda Petraksa; Jirapat Khanonta; Supanich Poolkerd	43.88	Vietnam; Phùng Thị Huệ; Lê Thị Cẩm Tú; Kha Thanh Trúc; Hà Thị Thu	43.91	Philippines; Lianne Diana Pama; Jessica Rose Laurance; Kristina Marie Knott; Zion Rose Nelson	43.97
4×400 m relay	Vietnam; Lê Tuyết Mai; Nguyễn Thị Hằng; Nguyễn Thị Ngọc; Hoàng Thị Minh Hạnh	3:32.59	Thailand; Arisa Weruwanarak; Benny Nontanam; Montida Thongprachukaew; Chinenye Josephine Onuorah	3:36.87	Philippines; Lauren Hoffman; Robyn Lauren Brown; Jeralyn Rodriguez; Bernalyn Bejoy	3:38.92
Marathon	Odekta Elvina Naibaho; Indonesia	02:43:13	Artjoy Torregosa; Philippines	02:48:00	Bùi Thị Thu Hà; Vietnam	02:54:40
20 km race walk	Violine Intan Puspita; Indonesia	01:46:52	May Htet Zin; Myanmar	01:47:41	Kotchaphon Tangsrivong; Thailand	01:48:15
High jump	Bùi Thị Kim Anh; Vietnam	1.86 m	Mariel Abuan; Philippines	1.80 m	Norliyana Kamaruddin; Malaysia	1.75 m
Pole vault	Diva Renatta Jayadi; Indonesia	4.35 m GR, NR	Chonthicha Khabut; Thailand	4.05 m	Chayanisa Chomchuendee; Thailand	3.90 m
Pole vault	Diva Renatta Jayadi; Indonesia	4.35 m GR, NR	Chonthicha Khabut; Thailand	4.05 m	Maria Andriani Melabessy; Indonesia	3.90 m
Long jump	Trần Thị Loan; Vietnam	6.53 m	Hà Thị Thúy Hằng; Vietnam	6.29 m	Maria Natalia Londa; Indonesia	6.27 m
Triple jump	Maria Natalia Londa; Indonesia	13.85 m	Parinya Chuaimaroeng; Thailand	13.79 m	Vũ Thị Ngọc Hà; Vietnam	13.68 m
Shot put	Nani Sahirah Maryata; Malaysia	16.91 m	Areerat Intadis; Thailand	16.04 m	Kim Thị Huyền; Vietnam	15.92 m
Discus throw	Subenrat Insaeng; Thailand	58.86 m	Queenie Ting Kung Ni; Malaysia	51.81 m	Lê Thị Cẩm Dung; Vietnam	49.34 m
Hammer throw	Grace Wong; Malaysia	65.41 m GR, NR	Mingkamon Koomphon; Thailand	60.74 m	Sawitree Kaewasuksri; Thailand	56.27 m
Javelin throw	Jariya Wichaidit; Thailand	55.64 m	Ng Jing Xuan; Malaysia	52.17 m NR	Bhianca Ana Espenilla; Philippines	51.66 m
Heptathlon	Emilia Nova; Indonesia	5,497 pts	Hoàng Thanh Giang; Vietnam	5,455 pts	Sarah De Quinan; Philippines	5,201 pts

=== Mixed events ===
Event	Gold		Silver		Bronze	
4 × 400 m relay	Vietnam; Lê Ngọc Phúc; Nguyễn Thị Hằng; Tạ Ngọc Tưởng; Nguyễn Thị Ngọc	3:15.07	Thailand; Sarawut Nuansi; Benny Nontanam; Joshua Robert Atkinson; Chinenye Josephine Onuorah	3:16.56	Philippines; Alhryan Labita; Bernalyn Bejoy; Angel Rene Watson; Alfred Talplacido	3:27.22
