= Yaspi Boby =

Indonesian sprinter (born 1987)

Personal information
- Born: 28 October 1987 (age 38)

Sport
- Country: Indonesia
- Sport: Track and field
- Event: 100 metres
Medal record
Men's Track and field
Representing Indonesia
Southeast Asian Games
Silver medal – second place	2015 Singapore	100m
Silver medal – second place	2017 Kuala Lumpur	4 × 100 m relay
Bronze medal – third place	2013 Naypyidaw	4 × 100 m relay
Bronze medal – third place	2015 Singapore	4 × 100 m relay

Yaspi Boby (born 28 October 1987) is an Indonesian sprinter. He competed in the 100 metres event at the 2015 World Championships in Athletics in Beijing, China.
