= Agus Prayogo =

Indonesian long-distance runner

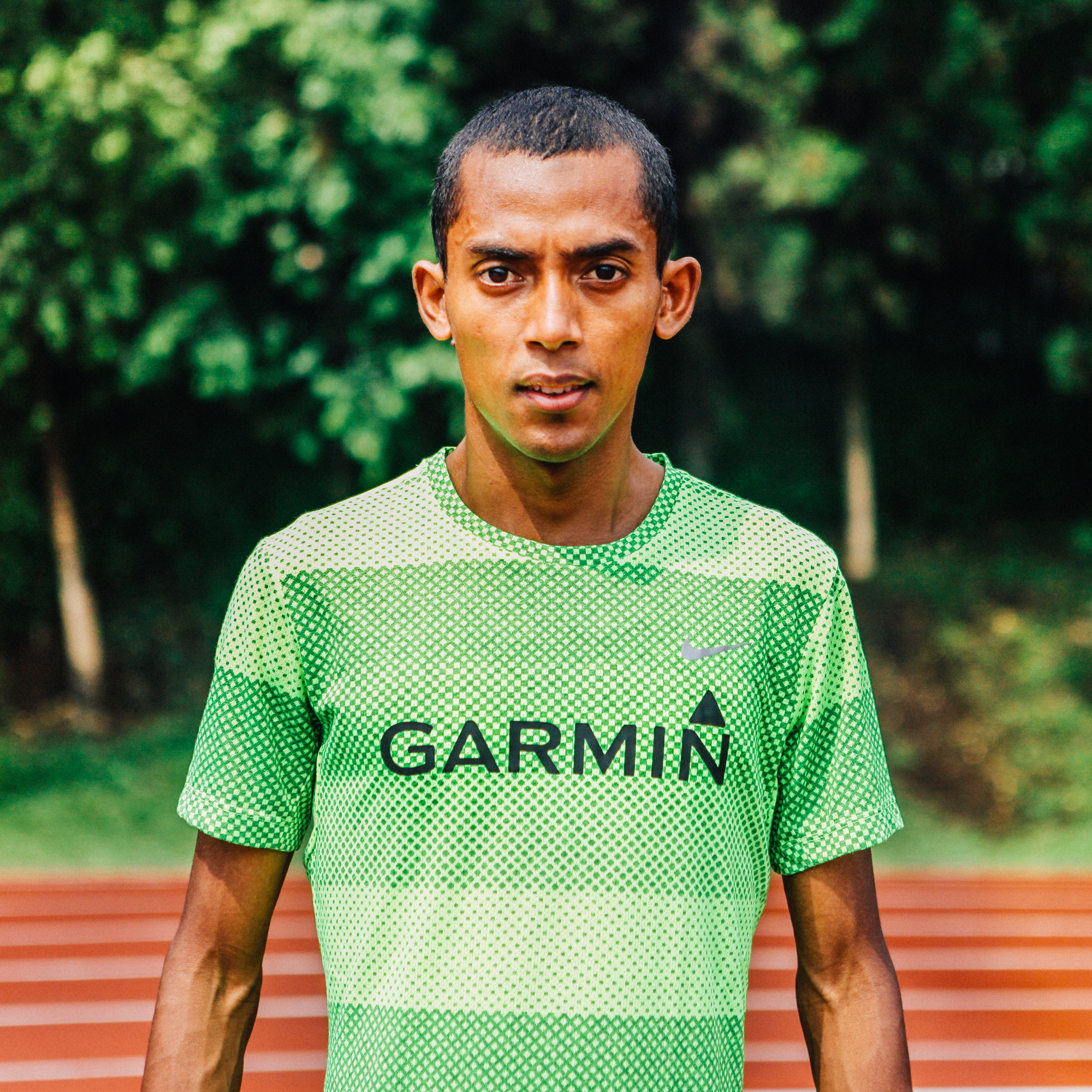

Personal information
- Nationality: Indonesian
- Born: 23 August 1985 (age 40) Bogor, West Java, Indonesia
- Height: 172 cm (5 ft 8 in)
- Weight: 54 kg (119 lb)

Sport
- Sport: Long-distance running
- Events: 5,000 metres, 10,000 metres, and marathon
Medal record
Men's athletics
Representing Indonesia
SEA Games
Gold medal – first place	2009 Vientiane	10,000 m
Gold medal – first place	2011 Jakarta–Palembang	5000 m
Gold medal – first place	2011 Jakarta–Palembang	10,000 m
Gold medal – first place	2015 Singapore	10,000 m
Gold medal – first place	2017 Kuala Lumpur	10,000 m
Gold medal – first place	2019 Philippines	Marathon
Gold medal – first place	2023 Cambodia	Marathon
Silver medal – second place	2015 Singapore	5000 m
Silver medal – second place	2017 Kuala Lumpur	Marathon
Silver medal – second place	2019 Philippines	10,000 m
Silver medal – second place	2021 Vietnam	Marathon
Bronze medal – third place	2013 Naypyidaw	10,000 m
Bronze medal – third place	2017 Kuala Lumpur	5000 m
ASEAN University Games
Gold medal – first place	2010 Chiang Mai	5,000 m
Silver medal – second place	2012 Vientiane	5,000 m
Silver medal – second place	2012 Vientiane	10,000 m

Agus Prayogo (born 23 August 1985 in Bogor) is an Indonesian long-distance runner. He currently holds the Indonesian national records for the 3000 metres, 5000 metres, 10,000 metres, and half marathon.

== Early life ==
Agus Prayogo is of Javanese descent, and was born in Bogor, West Java to Prayitno (father) and Supriyaningsih (mother). Prayogo spent his childhood in Magelang, Central Java. His talent for running was first identified while he was a student at PORSENI (Pekan Olahraga dan Seni) Elementary School. During junior high school (SMP), Prayogo moved to Salatiga and joined a local running club. After finishing his schooling, he enlisted in the Indonesian military. Prayogo is currently living in Bandung.
