= Quách Thị Lan =

Vietnamese sprinter and hurdler

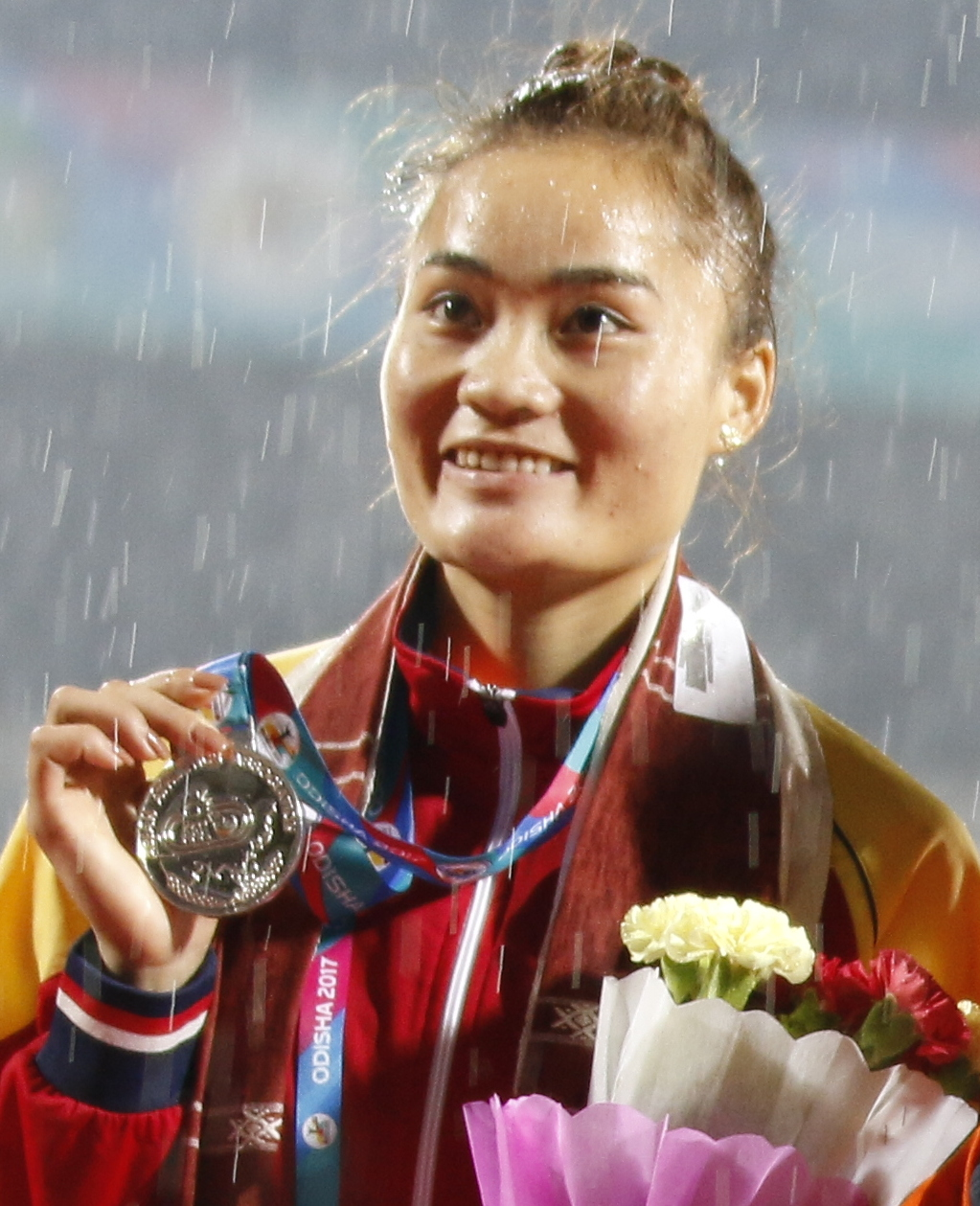
- Lan in 2017

Personal information
- Nationality: Vietnam
- Born: 18 October 1995 (age 31) Ngọc Lặc, Thanh Hóa, Vietnam
- Education: VNU University of Economics and Business
- Height: 175 cm (5 ft 9 in)
- Weight: 60 kg (132 lb)

Sport
- Sport: Athletics
- Events: 200 m, 400 m, 400 m hurdles

Achievements and titles
- Personal bests: 200 m – 23.72 (2018); 400 m – 52.06 (2014); 400 mH – 55.30 (2018, NR)
Medal record
Representing Vietnam
Asian Games
Gold medal – first place	2018 Jakarta	400 m hurdles
Silver medal – second place	2014 Incheon	400 m
Bronze medal – third place	2018 Jakarta	4 × 400 m relay
Bronze medal – third place	2026 Nagoya	Mixed 4 × 400 m relay
Asian Athletics Championships
Gold medal – first place	2017 Bhubaneswar	400 m
Gold medal – first place	2017 Bhubaneswar	4 × 400 m relay
Gold medal – first place	2019 Doha	400 m hurdles
Silver medal – second place	2025 Gumi	4 × 400 m relay
Asian Indoor Championships
Bronze medal – third place	2016 Doha	400 m
Southeast Asian Games
Gold medal – first place	2015 Singapore	4 × 400 m relay
Gold medal – first place	2017 Kuala Lumpur	4 × 400 m relay
Gold medal – first place	2019 Philippines	4 × 400 m relay
Gold medal – first place	2019 Philippines	Mixed 4 × 400 m relay
Gold medal – first place	2021 Vietnam	400 m hurdles
Gold medal – first place	2021 Vietnam	4 × 400 m relay
Gold medal – first place	2025 Thailand	400 m hurdles
Silver medal – second place	2013 Naypyidaw	400 m
Silver medal – second place	2013 Naypyidaw	400 m hurdles
Silver medal – second place	2013 Naypyidaw	4 × 400 m relay
Silver medal – second place	2015 Singapore	400 m
Silver medal – second place	2019 Philippines	Mixed 4 × 400 m relay
Silver medal – second place	2021 Vietnam	400 m hurdles
Bronze medal – third place	2019 Philippines	400 m
Bronze medal – third place	2021 Vietnam	400 m

Quách Thị Lan (born 18 October 1995) is a Vietnamese sprinter and hurdler who specialises in the 400 m distance. She won individual silver medals at the Southeast Asian Games (2013 and 2015), Asian Games (2014 and 2018) and Asian championships (2017).

Her elder brother Quách Công Lịch won three medals in the 400 m and 400 m hurdles events at the 2017 Southeast Asian Games.
