= Maria Natalia Londa =

Indonesian athlete (born 1990)

Personal information
- Born: 29 October 1990 (age 35) Denpasar, Bali, Indonesia
- Height: 1.65 m (5 ft 5 in)
- Weight: 56 kg (123 lb)

Sport
- Country: Indonesia
- Sport: Athletics
- Event: Triple jump Long Jump
- Coached by: I Made Sukariata
Medal record
Women's athletics
Representing Indonesia
Asian Games
Gold medal – first place	2014 Incheon	Long jump
Islamic Solidarity Games
Silver medal – second place	2017 Baku	Long jump
SEA Games
Gold medal – first place	2013 Naypyidaw	Long jump
Gold medal – first place	2013 Naypyidaw	Triple jump
Gold medal – first place	2015 Singapore	Long jump
Gold medal – first place	2015 Singapore	Triple jump
Gold medal – first place	2019 Philippines	Long jump
Gold medal – first place	2023 Cambodia	Long jump
Gold medal – first place	2025 Thailand	Triple jump
Silver medal – second place	2011 Jakarta–Palembang	Long jump
Silver medal – second place	2011 Jakarta–Palembang	Triple jump
Silver medal – second place	2017 Kuala Lumpur	Long jump
Silver medal – second place	2017 Kuala Lumpur	Triple jump
Silver medal – second place	2019 Philippines	Triple jump
Silver medal – second place	2023 Cambodia	Triple jump
Bronze medal – third place	2009 Vientiane	Long jump
Bronze medal – third place	2009 Vientiane	Triple jump
Bronze medal – third place	2021 Vietnam	Long jump
Bronze medal – third place	2021 Vietnam	Triple jump
Bronze medal – third place	2025 Thailand	Long jump
ASEAN University Games
Gold medal – first place	2010 Chiang Mai	Triple jump
Gold medal – first place	2012 Vientiane	Long jump
Gold medal – first place	2012 Vientiane	Triple jump
Gold medal – first place	2014 Palembang	Long jump
Gold medal – first place	2014 Palembang	Triple jump
Asian Junior Championships
Silver medal – second place	2008 Jakarta	Triple jump

Maria Natalia Londa (born 29 October 1990 in Denpasar) is an Indonesian track and field athlete who competes in the long jump and triple jump. She represented Indonesia at the World Championships in Athletics in 2007 and has appeared once at the Asian Games (2014). She won the gold medal at the 2014 Asian Games in the long jump. She also won two gold medals at the 2013 SEA Games and two gold medals at the 2015 SEA Games.

She competed for Indonesia in the long jump at the 2016 Summer Olympics. She placed 23rd in the qualifying round and did not advance to the finals. She was the flagbearer for Indonesia during the Parade of Nations.

== Career ==
=== Junior and early senior achievements ===
Londa junior career gained prominence at the 2008 Asian Junior Athletics Championships in Jakarta, where she secured the silver medal in the women's triple jump with a leap of 13.24 meters, marking her breakthrough on the regional youth stage.

Transitioning to early senior competition, Londa made her debut at the 2009 SEA Games in Vientiane, Laos, earning bronze medals in both the long jump (6.23 meters) and triple jump (13.31 meters), which highlighted her emerging versatility in horizontal jumps. These performances at age 19 established her as a promising talent for Indonesia, building on her foundational training.During her late teens and early 20s, Londa developed a dual specialization in long jump and triple jump, training intensively in both events to refine her technique and power, which allowed her to compete effectively across regional youth and senior platforms. Her academic pursuits at university further supported this progression by facilitating participation in university level games that complemented her athletic development.

=== National records and coaching ===
Londa holds the Indonesian national record in the women's long jump with a distance of 6.70 meters, achieved at the 2015 SEA Games in Singapore. She also established the national record in the triple jump at 14.17 meters during the 2013 SEA Games in Naypyidaw, Myanmar, surpassing her previous mark and demonstrating her versatility in horizontal jumping events. These records underscore her technical prowess and have stood as benchmarks for Indonesian athletes in the discipline. Londa's development was significantly influenced by her long term coaching relationship with I Made Sukariata, whom she met through athletics and later married.

Sukariata, a former national-level long jumper himself, has coached Londa since the early stages of her senior career, focusing on refining her takeoff technique, stride length, and overall consistency to optimize performance in both long and triple jumps. Under his guidance, Londa transformed her junior-level potential into sustained elite-level results, including multiple SEA Games titles that built toward her record-setting achievements.

Standing at 1.63 meters tall and weighing 57 kilograms, Londa's compact physique provided advantages in generating explosive power from the runway while maintaining balance during the jump phases, particularly in the triple jump's hop, step, and jump sequence. This build, combined with Sukariata's targeted training, enabled her to achieve efficient energy transfer and minimize injury risks over her extended career.

Londa established herself as a dominant force in Southeast Asian athletics, particularly in the long jump and triple jump events at the SEA Games. Across multiple editions from 2011 to 2025, she secured numerous medals, including several golds, contributing to a total of at least 12 SEA Games medals by 2019. Her achievements include a silver medal in the long jump at the 2011 SEA Games, where she set a national record of 6.47 m. In 2013, she claimed golds in both the long jump (6.39 m) and triple jump with a national record distance of 14.17 m at the 2013 SEA Games. Londa defended her prowess with double golds in both the long jump and triple jump at the 2015 Singapore SEA Games, successfully retaining her titles from previous editions.

She added a silver in the triple jump at the 2017 Kuala Lumpur Games and gold in the long jump (6.47 m) at the 2019 Manila edition, bringing her gold tally to five by that point. Further successes followed with a silver in the triple jump (13.45 m) at the 2022 Hanoi Games and gold in the long jump (6.28 m) at the 2023 SEA Games, underscoring her sustained excellence in the region. In 2025, at the Thailand SEA Games, she won gold in the triple jump (13.85 m) and bronze in the long jump (6.27 m).

On the broader Asian stage, Londa achieved a career highlight with gold in the women's long jump at the 2014 Asian Games, leaping 6.55 m to equal her personal best and secure Indonesia's first athletics gold at the event since 1998. She competed again at the 2018 Asian Games, finishing fifth in the long jump with 6.45 m.

Londa also excelled in other regional competitions, including the ASEAN University Games, where she won gold in the women's triple jump at the 2014 Palembang edition. At the 2017 Islamic Solidarity Games in Baku, she earned silver in the long jump with a best effort of 6.30 m. At the global level, Londa represented Indonesia at the 2016 Summer Olympics in Rio de Janeiro, competing in the women's long jump qualification round where she recorded 6.29 m but did not advance to the final.

Olympic Games
Preceded by I Gede Siman Sudartawa	Flagbearer for Indonesia; Rio de Janeiro 2016	Succeeded by Rio Waida
