= Dương Văn Thái =

Vietnamese middle-distance runner (born 1992)

Personal information
- Nationality: Vietnam
- Born: 18 April 1992 (age 34) Nam Định, Vietnam

Sport
- Sport: Middle-distance running
- Event(s): 800 metres and 1500 metres
Medal record
Men's Athletics
Representing Vietnam
Southeast Asian Games
Gold medal – first place	2011 Jakarta	Men's 800 m
Gold medal – first place	2013 Naypyidaw	Men's 1500 m
Gold medal – first place	2015 Singapore	Men's 800 m
Gold medal – first place	2015 Singapore	Men's 1500 m
Gold medal – first place	2017 Kuala Lumpur	Men's 800 m
Gold medal – first place	2017 Kuala Lumpur	Men's 1500 m
Gold medal – first place	2019 Manila	Men's 800 m
Gold medal – first place	2019 Manila	Men's 1500 m
Bronze medal – third place	2013 Naypyidaw	Men's 800 m

Dương Văn Thái (born 18 April 1992) is a Vietnamese middle-distance runner specializing in the 800 metres and 1500 metres.
