= Hoàng Nguyên Thanh =

Vietnamese marathoner (born 1995)

Personal information
- Born: Hoàng Nguyên Thanh; 1995 (age 30–31) Bình Phước Province, Việt Nam

Sport
- Country: Vietnam
- Sport: Athletics
- Event: Marathon
Medal record
Representing Vietnam
Athletics
SEA Games
Bronze medal – third place	SEA Games 2015	Marathon
Gold medal – first place	SEA Games 2021	Marathon

Hoàng Nguyên Thanh (born in 1995 in Bình Phước Province, Vietnam) is a Vietnamese marathoner, who has won five Vietnamese national championships in men's marathon. He is also the first Vietnamese runner to have ever won a gold medal in the men's marathon at the SEA Games, winning in 2021. He finished the marathon in 2:25:08, faster than the second-placed Prayogo by 30 seconds.

== Career ==
His best run for a marathon was in 2:18:42 in the Asian Marathon Championships in Hong Kong Marathon in Hong Kong, China in 2024, this record helps him break the national record for Vietnamese men's marathon in 21 years, since 2003.

In Vietnam, Hoàng Nguyên Thanh plays for Bình Phước Province Team, winning 4 consecutive championships in the Tiền Phong Marathon from 2020 to 2024, he finished in 2:26:5 in Tien Phong Marathon 2024.
