= Nguyễn Thành Ngưng =

Vietnamese race walker

Personal information
- Born: 8 April 1992 (age 34) Đà Nẵng, Vietnam
- Height: 1.65 m (5 ft 5 in)
- Weight: 55 kg (121 lb)

Sport
- Country: Vietnam
- Sport: Athletics
Medal record
Men's Athletics
Representing Vietnam
SEA Games
Silver medal – second place	2023 Phnom Penh	Men's 20km walk
Bronze medal – third place	2011 Jakarta	Men's 20km walk
Bronze medal – third place	2025 Bangkok	Men's 20km walk

Nguyễn Thành Ngưng (born 8 April 1992) is a Vietnamese race walker. He competed in the men's 20 kilometres walk at the 2016 Summer Olympics.
