= Nguyễn Thị Thanh Phúc =

Vietnamese racewalker

Personal information
- Born: Nguyễn Thị Thanh Phúc; 12 August 1990 (age 35) Hòa Vang, Đà Nẵng, Vietnam

Sport
- Country: Vietnam
- Sport: Athletics
- Event: 20 km Race Walk
Medal record
Representing Vietnam
Athletics
Asian Walk Race Championship
Silver medal – second place	2013 Nomi	20 km race walk
Bronze medal – third place	2012 Nomi	20 km race walk
Southeast Asian Games
Gold medal – first place	2011 Palembang	20 km race walk
Gold medal – first place	2013 Naypyidaw	20 km race walk
Gold medal – first place	2015 Singapore	20 km race walk
Gold medal – first place	2021 Vietnam	20 km race walk
Gold medal – first place	2023 Cambodia	20 km race walk
- Updated on 6 May 2023

Nguyễn Thị Thanh Phúc (born 12 August 1990 in Da Nang, Vietnam) is a Vietnamese race-walker. She competed for Vietnam at the 2012 Summer Olympics. Her brother, Nguyễn Thành Ngưng, also competed for Vietnam in race walking.
