= Nguyễn Thị Huyền (athlete) =

Vietnamese athletics competitor

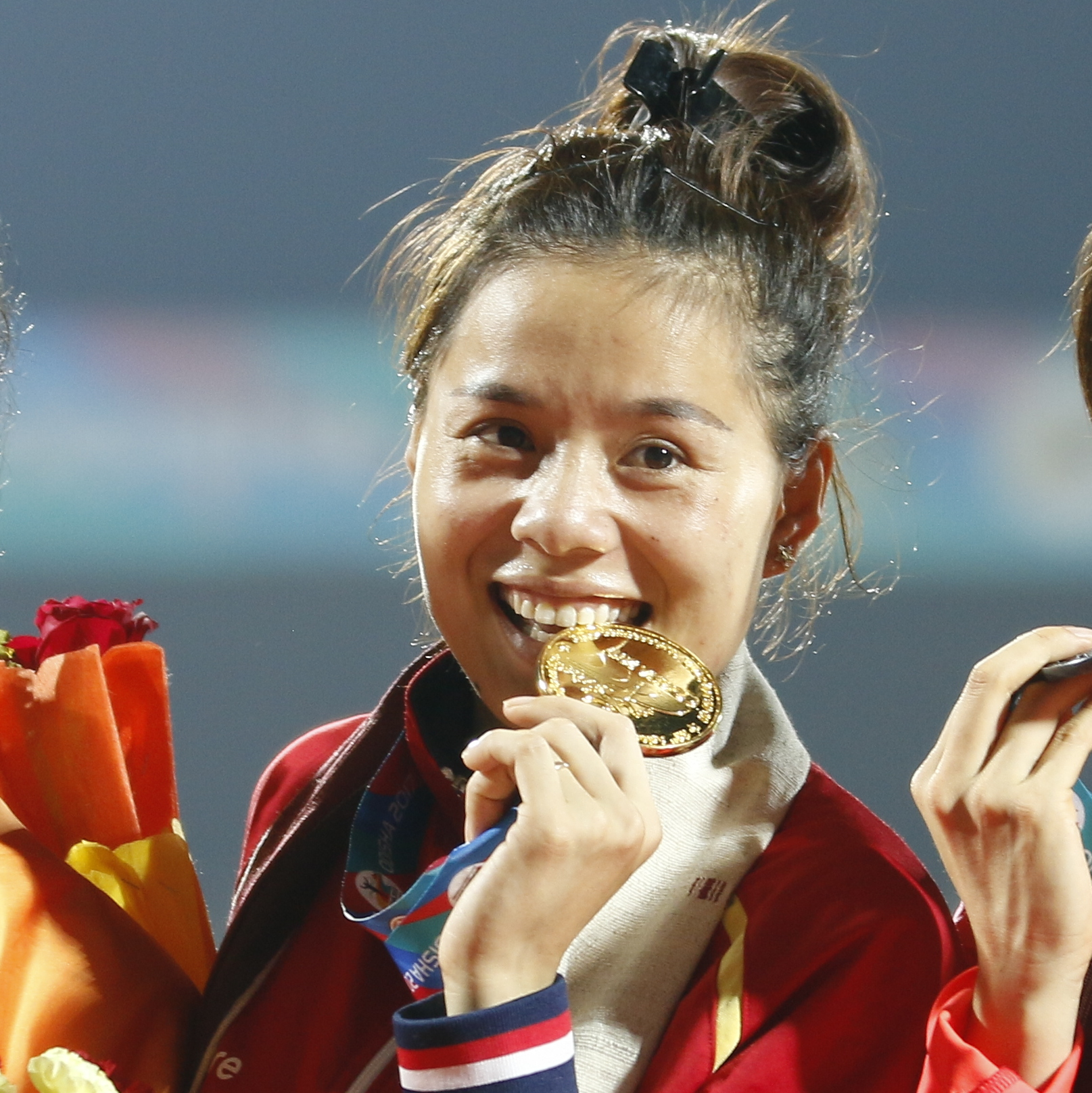
- Nguyễn at the 2017 Asian Championships

Personal information
- Nationality: Vietnam
- Born: May 19, 1993 (age 33) Ý Yên, Nam Định, Vietnam
- Height: 1.58 m (5 ft 2 in)
- Weight: 45 kg (99 lb)

Sport
- Sport: Track and field
- Event(s): 400 m, 400 m hurdles

Achievements and titles
- Personal best(s): 400 m - 52.00 (2015); 400 mH - 56.06 (2017)
Medal record
Representing Vietnam
Asian Athletics Championships
| Gold medal – first place | 2017 Bhubaneswar | 400 m hurdles |
| Gold medal – first place | 2017 Bhubaneswar | 4×400 m |
Asian Indoor Championships
| Silver medal – second place | 2023 Astana | 400 m |
Asian Junior Championships
| Gold medal – first place | 2012 Colombo | 400 m hurdles |
Southeast Asian Games
| Gold medal – first place | 2015 Singapore | 400 m |
| Gold medal – first place | 2015 Singapore | 400 m hurdles |
| Gold medal – first place | 2015 Singapore | 4 × 400 m |
| Gold medal – first place | 2017 Kuala Lumpur | 400 m hurdles |
| Gold medal – first place | 2017 Kuala Lumpur | 400 m |
| Gold medal – first place | 2017 Kuala Lumpur | 4 × 400 m |
| Gold medal – first place | 2023 Phnom Penh | Mixed 4×400 m |

Nguyễn Thị Huyền (born 19 May 1993) is a Vietnamese runner and hurdler who specializes in the 400 m distance.

At the 2014 Asian Games Nguyễn finished seventh in the 400 metres and fifth in the 4 × 400 m relay.

At the 2015 Southeast Asian Games Nguyễn won the 400 m, 400 m hurdles, and 4×400 m relay and set games records in the latter two events. Her results in these games gave her two individual qualifying times for the 2015 World Championships in Athletics and the 2016 Olympics.
