= Quách Công Lịch =

Vietnamese athletics competitor

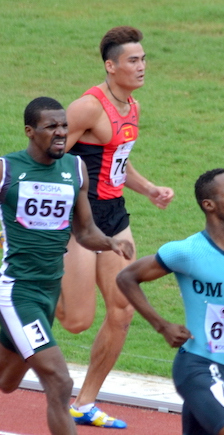
- Quách (center) at the 2017 Asian Championships

Personal information
- Nationality: Vietnam
- Born: 27 August 1993 (age 32) Thanh Hóa, Vietnam
- Education: Peking University
- Height: 185 cm (6 ft 1 in)
- Weight: 80 kg (176 lb)

Sport
- Sport: Athletics
- Event(s): 200 m, 400 m, 400 m hurdles
- Coached by: Vu Ngoc Loi; Nguyen Thi Thanh Huong

Achievements and titles
- Personal best(s): 200 m – 21.67 (2016); 400 m – 45.99 (2015); 400 mH – 50.05 (2017)
Medal record
Representing Vietnam
Southeast Asian Games
| Gold medal – first place | 2023 Phnom Penh | Mixed 4×400 m |
| Silver medal – second place | 2015 Singapore | 400 m hurdles |
| Silver medal – second place | 2015 Singapore | 400 m |
| Bronze medal – third place | 2015 Singapore | Men's 4×400 m |
| Silver medal – second place | 2017 Kuala Lumpur | 400 m hurdles |
| Silver medal – second place | 2017 Kuala Lumpur | Men's 4×400 m |
| Bronze medal – third place | 2017 Kuala Lumpur | 400 m |

Quách Công Lịch (born 27 August 1993) is a sprinter and hurdler from Vietnam who specialises in the 400 m distance. He won four silver and two bronze medals at the Southeast Asian Games in 2015–2017, and served as the flag bearer for Vietnam during the opening ceremony in 2015. His younger sister Quách Thị Lan also won multiple medals in the 400 m and 400 m hurdles at the Southeast Asian Games.
