= Nguyễn Văn Hùng (athlete) =

Vietnamese triple jumper

Personal information
- Nationality: Vietnamese
- Born: April 3, 1989 (age 37)

Sport
- Sport: Track and field
- Event: Triple jump

Nguyễn Văn Hùng (born April 3, 1989) is a Vietnamese track and field athlete specializing in the triple jump. He competed in the 2009 World Championships in Athletics, failing to qualify for the final, and finished fifth in the 2009 Southeast Asian Games. In July 2010, at the 17th Ho Chi Minh City Open International Athletics Tournament, he set a new Vietnamese national record in the triple jump, leaping 16.41 meters (53 ft 10.1 in) and breaking his own previous record of 16.37 meters (53 ft 8.5 in).

== See also ==
- Vietnamese records in athletics
