= Sanchai Namkhet =

Thai long-distance runner

Personal information
- Nationality: Thai
- Born: December 16, 1989 (age 36) Surin, Thailand
Medal record
Men's athletics
Representing Thailand
Southeast Asian Games
| Bronze medal – third place | 2015 Singapore | 5,000 m |
| Bronze medal – third place | 2017 Kuala Lumpur | 10,000 m |
| Silver medal – second place | 2019 Kuala Lumpur | Marathon |

Sanchai Namkhet (Thai: สัญชัย นามเขต) is a Thai long-distance runner.

== Personal bests ==
Outdoor

- 3000m - 8:36.90 (Chonburi 2013)
- 5000m - 14:40.59 (Singapore 2015)
- 10,000m - 30:35.54 (Naypiydaw 2013)
- 3000m steeplechase - 9:25.66 (Vientiane 2012)
- Half Marathon - 1:08:41 (Buriram 2017)
- Marathon - 2:34:39 (Samui Island 2012)

Indoor

- 3000m - 8:36.95 (Ashgabat 2017)
