= Nguyễn Văn Lai =

Vietnamese long-distance runner

Personal information
- Nationality: Vietnamese
- Born: 10 June 1986 (age 39)

Sport
- Sport: Long-distance running

Nguyễn Văn Lai (born 10 June 1986) is a Vietnamese long-distance runner. In 2007, Nguyễn began training at the Vietnamese Army Sports Training Center (Trung tâm thể dục thể thao quân đội) in Hanoi, when his talent for running was identified while he was serving in the military.

Nguyễn's family is currently living in Thanh Hóa Province.
