= Athletics at the 2011 SEA Games – Results =

These are the official results of the athletics competition at the 2011 SEA Games which was held from 12 to 16 November 2011 in Palembang, Indonesia.

== Men's events ==
=== Track ===
==== 100 metres ====
- Records

Prior to this competition, the existing world, Asian, and Southeast Asian Games records were as follows.

World Record	Usain Bolt (JAM)	9.58	Berlin, Germany	16 August 2009
Asian Record	Samuel Francis (QAT)	9.99	Amman, Jordan	26 July 2007
Games Record	Suryo Agung Wibowo (INA)	10.17	Vientiane, Laos	13 December 2009

===== Round 1 =====
Qualification rule: The first there finishers in each heat (Q) plus the two fastest times of those who finished four or lower in their heat (q) qualified.

====== Heat 1 ======
- November 12, 09:00
- Wind: -0.8 m/s

Rank	Lane	Athlete	Time	Notes
1	4	Fadlin (INA)	10.69	Q
2	6	Ambrose Anak Jilom (MAS)	10.78	Q
3	2	Wachara Sondee (THA)	10.85	Q
4	7	Pin Wanhaep (CAM)	11.09	q
5	5	Muhammad Elfi Bin Mustopa (SIN)	11.22	
6	2	Chit San Maung (MYA)	11.75	

====== Heat 2 ======
- November 12, 09:05

Rank	Lane	Athlete	Time	Notes
1	6	Franklin Ramses Burumi (INA)	10.54	Q
2	4	Yeo Foo Ee Gary (SIN)	10.64	Q
3	3	Mohammad Noor Imran Abdul Hadi (MAS)	10.73	Q
4	5	Suppachai Chimdee (THA)	10.75	q
5	2	Sar Churp Veasna (CAM)	11.46	

===== FINAL =====
- November 12, 18:30
- Wind: +2.1 m/s

Rank	Lane	Athlete	Time	Notes
1st place, gold medalist(s)	6	Franklin Ramses Burumi (INA)	10.37	
2nd place, silver medalist(s)	3	Yeo Foo Ee Gary (SIN)	10.46	
3rd place, bronze medalist(s)	8	Wachara Sondee (THA)	10.47	
4	4	Fadlin (INA)	10.51	
5	1	Suppachai Chimdee (THA)	10.53	
6	7	Mohammad Noor Imran Abdul Hadi (MAS)	10.55	
7	2	Pin Wanhaep (CAM)	10.91	
8	5	Ambrose Anak Jilom (MAS)	76.31	

==== 200 metres ====
- Records

Prior to this competition, the existing world, Asian, and Southeast Asian Games records were as follows.

World Record	Usain Bolt (JAM)	19.19	Berlin, Germany	20 August 2009
Asian Record	Shingo Suetsugu (JPN)	20.03	Yokohama, Japan	7 June 2003
Games Record	Reanchai Seeharwong (THA)	20.69	Bandar Seri Begawan, Brunei	10 August 1999

===== Round 1 =====
Qualification rule: The first there finishers in each heat (Q) plus the two fastest times of those who finished four or lower in their heat (q) qualified.

====== Heat 1 ======
- November 14, 07:30
- Wind: -1.4 m/s

Rank	Lane	Athlete	Time	Notes
1	4	Franklin Ramses Burumi (INA)	21.29	Q
2	3	Suppachai Chimdee (THA)	21.74	Q
3	5	Lee Cheng Wei (SIN)	22.21	Q
4	6	Moh Ikhwan Nor (MAS)	22.48	q
5	2	Sar Churp Veasna (CAM)	23.67	

====== Heat 2 ======
- November 14, 07:35
- Wind: -1.4 m/s

Rank	Lane	Athlete	Time	Notes
1	6	Fernando Lumain (INA)	21.89	Q
2	3	Sompote Suwannarangsri (THA)	22.07	Q
3	4	Mohammad Noor Imran Abdul Hadi (MAS)	22.28	Q
4	5	Calvin Kang Li Loong (SIN)	22.28	q
5	2	Wanhaeb Pin (CAM)	22.66	
6	7	Thet Zaw Win (MYA)	22.86	

===== FINAL =====
- November 14, 18:40
- Wind: +1.7 m/s

Rank	Lane	Athlete	Time	Notes
1st place, gold medalist(s)	3	Franklin Ramses Burumi (INA)	20.93	
2nd place, silver medalist(s)	4	Suppachai Chimdee (THA)	21.05	
3rd place, bronze medalist(s)	6	Sompote Suwannarangsri (THA)	21.46	
4	5	Fernando Lumain (INA)	21.47	
5	7	Lee Cheng Wei (SIN)	21.60	
6	8	Mohammad Noor Imran Abdul Hadi (MAS)	21.64	
7	2	Moh Ikhwan Nor (MAS)	21.72	
8	1	Calvin Kang Li Loong (SIN)	21.95	

==== 400 metres ====
- Records

Prior to this competition, the existing world, Asian, and Southeast Asian Games records were as follows.

World Record	Michael Johnson (USA)	43.18	Seville, Spain	26 August 1999
Asian Record	Mohamed Amer Al-Malky (OMA)	44.56	Budapest, Hungary	12 August 1988
Games Record	Aktawat Sakulchan (THA)	46.05	Chiang Mai, Thailand	10 December 1995

===== Round 1 =====
Qualification rule: The first there finishers in each heat (Q) plus the two fastest times of those who finished four or lower in their heat (q) qualified.

====== Heat 1 ======
November 12, 20:05

Rank	Lane	Athlete	Time	Notes
1	6	Archand Christian Bagsit (PHI)	48.95	Q
2	4	Heru Astriyanto (INA)	49.19	Q
3	5	Khoo Kian Seong Kenneth (SIN)	49.79	Q
4	3	Chanatip Ruckburee (THA)	51.41	
5	2	Anopusone Xaysa (LAO)	54.27	

====== Heat 2 ======
November 12, 20:10

Rank	Lane	Athlete	Time	Notes
1	2	Yacobus Leuwol (INA)	48.99	Q
2	6	Arnon Jaijaree (THA)	49.11	Q
3	5	Julius Felicisimo Nierras, Jr. (PHI)	49.22	Q
4	4	Ng Chin Hui (SIN)	49.77	q
5	3	Zaw Lwin Htoo (MYA)	50.25	q

===== FINAL =====
- November 13, 19:30

Rank	Lane	Athlete	Time	Notes
1st place, gold medalist(s)	3	Heru Astriyanto (INA)	47.53	
2nd place, silver medalist(s)	5	Archand Christian Bagsit (PHI)	47.71	
3rd place, bronze medalist(s)	4	Yacobus Leuwol (INA)	47.97	
4	1	Ng Chin Hui (SIN)	48.37	
5	8	Julius Felicisimo Nierras, Jr. (PHI)	48.62	
6	6	Arnon Jaijaree (THA)	49.01	
7	2	Zaw Lwin Htoo (MYA)	49.66	
8	7	Khoo Kian Seong Kenneth (SIN)	49.74	

==== 800 m ====
Prior to this competition, the existing world, Asian, and Southeast Asian Games records were as follows.

World Record	David Rudisha (KEN)	1:41.01	Berlin, Germany	29 August 2010
Asian Record	Yusuf Saad Kamel (BRN)	1:42.79	Fontvieille, Monaco	29 July 2008
Games Record	Samson Vellabouy (MAS)	1:48.29	Kuala Lumpur, Malaysia	14 August 1989

- November 15, 18:45

Rank	Lane	Athlete	Time	Notes
1st place, gold medalist(s)	7	Duong Van Thai (VIE)	1:49.42	
2nd place, silver medalist(s)	8	Marvin Guarte (PHI)	1:50.69	
3rd place, bronze medalist(s)	5	Abdul Haris (INA)	1:51.28	
4	6	Wacharin Waekachi (THA)	1:51.45	
5	7	Kieng Samorn (CAM)	1:53.17	
6	2	Edgardo Alejan (PHI)	1:53.39	
7	5	Thet Zaw Win (MYA)	1:55.29	
8	2	Srikharin Wannasa (THA)	1:55.59	
9	1	Ridwan (INA)	1:57.39	
10	4	Nguyen Dinh Cuong (VIE)	2:15.33	
—	3	Mohd Jironi Ridzuan (MAS)		DNF

==== 1500 m ====
Prior to this competition, the existing world, Asian, and Southeast Asian Games records were as follows.

World Record	Hicham El-Guerrouj (MAR)	3:26.00	Rome, Italy	14 July 1998
Asian Record	Rashid Ramzi (BRN)	3:29.14	Rome, Italy	14 July 2006
Games Record	Nguyen Dinh Cuong (VIE)	3:45.31	Nakhon Ratchasima, Thailand	11 December 2007

- November 13, 20:00

Rank	Lane	Athlete	Time	Notes
1st place, gold medalist(s)	9	Ridwan (INA)	3:47.63	
2nd place, silver medalist(s)	10	Marvin Guarte (PHI)	3:47.65	
3rd place, bronze medalist(s)	11	Nguyen Dinh Cuong (VIE)	3:49.48	
4	3	Duong Van Thai (VIE)	3:53.32	
5	7	Maung Chet (MYA)	3:57.03	
6	1	Patikarn Pechsricha (THA)	4:00.71	
7	2	Edi Hariyanto (INA)	4:07.71	
8	5	Kieng Samorn (CAM)	4:11.26	
9	4	Zeyar Win (MYA)	4:16.82	
10	8	Wacharin Waekachi (THA)	4:17.30	
—	6	Mohd Jironi Ridzuan (MAS)		DQ

- Malaysia's Mohd Jironi Riduan finished third in the 1500 m but was disqualified for pulling on another athlete's shirt.

==== 5000 m ====
Prior to this competition, the existing world, Asian, and Southeast Asian Games records were as follows.

World Record	Kenenisa Bekele (ETH)	12:37.35	Hengelo, Netherlands	31 May 2004
Asian Record	Saif Saeed Shaheen (QAT)	12:51.98	Rome, Italy	14 July 2006
Games Record	Murusamy Ramachandran (MAS)	14:08.97	Singapore	15 June 1993

- November 15, 18:00

Rank	Lane	Athlete	Time	Notes
1st place, gold medalist(s)	7	Agus Prayogo (INA)	14:10.01	
2nd place, silver medalist(s)	11	Jauhari Johan (INA)	14:35.98	
3rd place, bronze medalist(s)	5	Nguyen Van Lai (VIE)	14:41.30	
4	10	Boonthung Srisung (THA)	14:50.63	
5	6	Naing San (MYA)	15:22.67	
6	2	Julius Sermona (PHI)	15:23.75	
7	9	Augusto Ramos Soares (TLS)	15:27.54	
8	3	Thein Hlaing Oo (MYA)	15:34.03	
9	8	Nik Fakarudin Ismail (MAS)	15:34.62	
10	1	Ribeiro Pino De Carvalho (TLS)	16:04.99	
11	4	Kutidom Aumyot (THA)	16:07.97	
—	13	Rene Gamarcha Herrera (PHI)		DNF
—	12	Sysavath Thammavongchit (LAO)		DNS

==== 10000 m ====
Prior to this competition, the existing world, Asian, and Southeast Asian Games records were as follows.

World Record	Kenenisa Bekele (ETH)	26:17.53	Brussels, Belgium	26 August 2005
Asian Record	Ahmad Hassan Abdullah (QAT)	26:36.76	Brussels, Belgium	5 September 2003
Games Record	Eduardo Buenavista (PHI)	29:19.97	Hanoi, Vietnam	7 December 2003

- November 13, 18:00

Rank	Lane	Athlete	Time	Notes
1st place, gold medalist(s)	4	Agus Prayogo (INA)	30:10.43	
2nd place, silver medalist(s)	7	Jauhari Johan (INA)	30:43.62	
3rd place, bronze medalist(s)	1	Nguyen Van Lai (VIE)	31:22.20	
4	6	Boonthung Srisung (THA)	31:31.61	
5	3	Julius Sermona (PHI)	32:25.14	
6	9	Augusto Ramos Soares (TLS)	32:40.94	
7	8	Naing San (MYA)	33:34.52	
8	10	Thein Hlaing Oo (MYA)	33:34.63	
—	2	Sanchai Namkhet (THA)		DNF
—	5	Eduardo Buenavista (PHI)		DNF

==== 110 m hurdles ====
- Records

Prior to this competition, the existing world, Asian, and Southeast Asian Games records were as follows.

World Record	Aries Merritt (USA)	12.80	Brussels, Belgium	7 September 2012
Asian Record	Liu Xiang (CHN)	12.88	Lausanne, Switzerland	11 July 2006
Games Record	Jamras Rittidet (THA)	13.89	Vientiane, Laos	16 December 2009

===== Round 1 =====
Qualification rule: The first there finishers in each heat (Q) plus the two fastest times of those who finished four or lower in their heat (q) qualified.

====== Heat 1 ======
November 13, 08:45

Rank	Lane	Athlete	Time	Notes
1	3	Nguyen Ngoc Quang (VIE)	14.64	Q
2	4	Rayzam Shah Wan Sofian (MAS)	14.76	Q
3	5	Jamras Rittidet (THA)	14.90	Q
4	6	Patrick Ma. Unso (PHI)	15.05	q
5	2	Soulisack Silisavadymao (LAO)	16.34	

====== Heat 2 ======
November 13, 08:50

Rank	Lane	Athlete	Time	Notes
1	3	Mohd Robani Hassan (MAS)	14.24	Q
2	4	Narongdech Janjai (THA)	14.71	Q
3	2	Rio Maholtra (INA)	14.95	Q
4	5	Vo Van Hung (VIE)	15.00	q

===== FINAL =====
- November 13, 18:45
- Wind: +0.7 m/s

Rank	Lane	Athlete	Time	Notes
1st place, gold medalist(s)	7	Jamras Rittidet (THA)	13.77	GR NR
2nd place, silver medalist(s)	5	Rayzam Shah Wan Sofian (MAS)	13.86	
3rd place, bronze medalist(s)	6	Mohd Robani Hassan (MAS)	14.14	
4	4	Nguyen Ngoc Quang (VIE)	14.19	
5	3	Narongdech Janjai (THA)	14.30	
6	2	Patrick Ma. Unso (PHI)	14.58	
7	1	Vo Van Hung (VIE)	14.74	
8	8	Rio Maholtra (INA)	15.00	

==== 400 m hurdles ====
- Records

Prior to this competition, the existing world, Asian, and Southeast Asian Games records were as follows.

World Record	Kevin Young (USA)	46.78	Barcelona, Spain	6 August 1992
Asian Record	Hadi Soua'an Al-Somaily (KSA)	47.53	Sydney, Australia	27 September 2000
Games Record	Chanon Keanchan (THA)	49.76	Chiang Mai, Thailand	12 December 1995

===== Round 1 =====
Qualification rule: The first there finishers in each heat (Q) plus the two fastest times of those who finished four or lower in their heat (q) qualified.

====== Heat 1 ======
November 14, 18:00

Rank	Lane	Athlete	Time	Notes
1	5	Junrey O Bano (PHI)	52.21	Q
2	6	Andrian (INA)	52.83	Q
3	8	Muhammad Firdaus Mazalan (MAS)	52.87	Q
4	4	Vu Van Tinh (VIE)	53.38	q
5	3	Muhammad Zaki Sapari (SIN)	53.51	q
6	7	Nitat Kaewkhong (THA)	53.69	
7	2	Anopusone Xaysa (LAO)	59.08	

====== Heat 2 ======
November 14, 08:05

Rank	Lane	Athlete	Time	Notes
1	4	Narongdech Janjai (THA)	52.92	Q
2	5	Dao Xuan Cuong (VIE)	52.97	Q
3	7	Rio Prasetyo (INA)	54.45	Q
4	3	Mohamed Baihaqi Razlan (MAS)	55.33	
5	6	Yap Jin Wei (SIN)	55.51	
—	2	Patrick Ma. Unso (PHI)	DNS	

===== FINAL =====
- November 15, 17:30

Rank	Lane	Athlete	Time	Notes
1st place, gold medalist(s)	6	Dao Xuan Cuong (VIE)	51.45	
2nd place, silver medalist(s)	5	Narongdech Janjai (THA)	51.60	
3rd place, bronze medalist(s)	3	Andrian (INA)	51.70	
4	4	Junrey O Bano (PHI)	51.75	
5	8	Muhammad Firdaus Mazalan (MAS)	52.57	
6	2	Vu Van Tinh (VIE)	52.95	
7	7	Rio Prasetyo (INA)	53.83	
8	1	Muhammad Zaki Sapari (SIN)	54.51	

==== 3000 metre Steeplechase ====
- Records

Prior to this competition, the existing world, Asian, and Southeast Asian Games records were as follows.

World Record	Saif Saaeed Shaheen (QAT)	7:53.63	Brussels, Belgium	3 September 2004
Asian Record	Saif Saaeed Shaheen (QAT)	7:53.63	Brussels, Belgium	3 September 2004
Games Record	Eduardo Buenavista (PHI)	8:40.77	Kuala Lumpur, Malaysia	12 December 2001

- November 12, 19.35
- FINAL

Rank	Athlete	Time
1st place, gold medalist(s)	Rene Herrera (PHI)	8:52.23
2nd place, silver medalist(s)	Muhammad Al Quraisy (INA)	8:55.91
3rd place, bronze medalist(s)	Nguyen Dang Duc Ba (VIE)	8:57.88
4	Nguyen Van Ly (VIE)	9:09.66
5	Hernani Sore (PHI)	9:19.05
6	Yogi Triono (INA)	9:26.39
7	Patikarn Pechsrich (THA)	9:27.16
8	Ahmad Luth Bin Ham (MAS)	9:31.22
9	Sanchai Namkhet (THA)	9:42.97
10	Thammavongchith Sysavath (LAO)	9:50.69
11	Karthik Jayaraman (MAS)	9:51.53
12	Ribeiro (TLS)	10:01.60
13	Soe Naing Win (MYA)	10:03.16
14	Chan Myaye Aung (MYA)	10:13.01

==== 4x100 metres ====
- Records

Prior to this competition, the existing world, Asian, and Southeast Asian Games records were as follows.

World Record	Jamaica	37.04	Daegu, South Korea	4 September 2011
Asian Record	Japan	38.03	Osaka, Japan	1 September 2007
Games Record	Thailand	38.95	Nakhon Ratchasima, Thailand	10 December 2007

- November 15, 19:20

Rank	Lane	Nation	Competitors	Time	Notes
1st place, gold medalist(s)	3	Indonesia (INA)	Fernando Lumain, Franklin Ramses Burumi, Fadlin, Farrel Octaviandi	39.91	Detail Time : 39.905
2nd place, silver medalist(s)	2	Singapore (SIN)	Calvin Kang Li Loong, Muhd Amiruddin Jamal, Lee Cheng Wei, Gary Yeo Foo Ee	39.91	Detail Time : 39.909
3rd place, bronze medalist(s)	4	Malaysia (MAS)	Mohd Zabidi Ghazali, Mohd Ikhwan Nor, Mohd Azhar Ismail, Mohd Noor Imran Hadi	40.41	
4	5	Thailand (THA)	Jirapon Meenapra, Suppacha Chimdee, Sompote Suwannarangsri, Wachara Sondee	40.44	

==== 4x400 metres ====
- Records

Prior to this competition, the existing world, Asian, and Southeast Asian Games records were as follows.

World Record	United States	2:54.29	Stuttgart, Germany	22 August 1993
Asian Record	Japan	3:00.76	Atlanta, United States	3 August 1996
Games Record	Thailand	3:05.47	Chiang Mai, Thailand	15 December 1995

- November 14, 20:00

Rank	Lane	Nation	Competitors	Time	Notes
1st place, gold medalist(s)	3	Philippines (PHI)	Edgardo Alejan, Julius Felicisimo Nierras, Junrey Bano, Archand Christian Bagsit	3:11.16	
2nd place, silver medalist(s)	2	Thailand (THA)	Jukkatip Phocharoen, Saharat Summayan, Nitipol Thongpoon, Suppachai Chimdee	3:14.90	
3rd place, bronze medalist(s)	7	Singapore (SIN)	Muhd Zaki Sapari, Ng Chin Hui, Kenneth Khoo, Lance Tan Wei Sheng	3:18.50	
4	5	Indonesia (INA)	Yacobus Leuwol, Arif Rahman, Abdul Rajak, Heru Astriyanto	3:20.18	
—	6	Myanmar (MYA)	Htet Hmu Zaw, Zaw Lwin Htoo, Aye Min Thein, Thet Zaw Win	DQ	
—	4	Malaysia (MAS)	Subramaniam Kannathasan, Panerselvan Yuvaaraj, Schzuan Ahmad Rosely, Muhamad Yunus Lasaleh	DQ	Team member Muhamad Yunus Lasaleh tested positive for doping

=== Field events ===
==== High jump ====
- Records

Prior to this competition, the existing world, Asian, and Southeast Asian Games records were as follows.

World Record	Javier Sotomayor (CUB)	2.45	Salamanca, Spain	27 July 1993
Asian Record	Mutaz Essa Barshim (QAT)	2.40	Eugene, United States	1 June 2013
Games Record	Loo Kum Zee (MAS)	2.24	Chiang Mai, Thailand	14 December 1995

- November 14, 18:00

Rank	Athlete	1.90	1.95	2.00	2.04	2.08	2.12	2.15	2.20	Result	Notes
1st place, gold medalist(s)	Lee Hup Wei (MAS)	—	—	O	O	O	XO	O	XXX	2.15	
2nd place, silver medalist(s)	Pramkote Pumurai (THA)	—	O	O	O	XO	XO	XXX		2.12	
3rd place, bronze medalist(s)	Nguyen Duy Bang (VIE)	—	O	O	O	XO	XXX			2.08	
4	Dao Van Thuy (VIE)	O	O	O	XO	XXO	XXX			2.08	
5	Hassaim Ahmad Najwan Aqra (MAS)	—	XO	O	XO	XXO	XXX			2.08	
6	Torlarp Sudjunta (THA)	—	—	—	XXO	XXX				2.04	
7	Syahrial (INA)	—	—	XO	XXO	XXX				2.04	
8	Andre Darmawan (INA)	O	O	XXO	XXX					2.00	

==== Pole vault ====
- November 12 - FINAL
- FINAL

Rank	Athlete	Result
1st place, gold medalist(s)	Kreeta Sintawachee (THA)	5.10m
2nd place, silver medalist(s)	Sompong Saombankua (THA)	5.00m
3rd place, bronze medalist(s)	Henri Setiawan (INA)	4.70m
4	Chong Ming Xun (SIN)	4.70m
5	Nguyen Van Hue (VIE)	4.60m
6	Tun Tun Lin (MYA)	4.40m

==== Discus throw ====
- Records

Prior to this competition, the existing world, Asian, and Southeast Asian Games records were as follows.

World Record	Jürgen Schult (GDR)	74.08 m	Neubrandenburg, East Germany	6 June 1986
Asian Record	Ehsan Haddadi (IRI)	69.32 m	Tallinn, Estonia	3 June 2008
Games Record	Wong Tuck Yim (SIN)	59.50 m	Bandar Seri Begawan, Brunei	8 August 1999

- November 12, 08.30
- FINAL

Rank	Athlete	Attempts						Result	Notes
Rank	Athlete	1	2	3	4	5	6	Result	Notes
1st place, gold medalist(s)	James Wong Tuck Yim (SIN)	49.64	X	X	51.32	51.05	50.18	51.32	
2nd place, silver medalist(s)	Hermanto (INA)	48.99	47.46	46.98	49.52	49.16	50.56	50.56	
3rd place, bronze medalist(s)	Kwanchai Numsomboo (THA)	50.28	X	49.21	50.21	49.93	49.98	50.28	
4	Sathaporn Kajorn (THA)	40.75	X	X	X	41.99	X	41.99	
5	Guntur Wahyu Arif (INA)	X	X	36.31	X	38.18	40.10	40.10	

== Women's events ==
=== Track events ===
==== 100 metres ====
- Records

Prior to this competition, the existing world, Asian, and Southeast Asian Games records were as follows.

World Record	Florence Griffith-Joyner (USA)	10.49	Indianapolis, United States	16 July 1988
Asian Record	Li Xuemei (CHN)	10.79	Shanghai, China	18 October 1997
Games Record	Lydia De Vega (PHI)	11.28	Jakarta, Indonesia	16 December 1987

- FINAL
- November 12, 18:15
- Wind: +1.7 m/s

Rank	Lane	Athlete	Time	Notes
1st place, gold medalist(s)	2	Serafi Anelies Unani (INA)	11.69	
2nd place, silver medalist(s)	5	Nongnuch Sanrat (THA)	11.69	
3rd place, bronze medalist(s)	4	Vu Thi Huong (VIE)	11.73	
4	3	Neeranuch Klomdee (THA)	11.84	
5	1	Nurul Sarah Abdul Kadir (MAS)	11.86	
6	8	Nurul Imaniar (INA)	11.87	
7	7	Le Ngoc Phuong (VIE)	11.89	
8	6	Norjannah Hafiszah Jamaluddin (MAS)	12.03	

==== 200 metres ====
- Records

Prior to this competition, the existing world, Asian, and Southeast Asian Games records were as follows.

World Record	Florence Griffith-Joyner (USA)	21.34	Seoul, South Korea	29 September 1988
Asian Record	Li Xuemei (CHN)	22.01	Shanghai, China	22 October 1997
Games Record	Supavadee Khawpeag (THA)	23.30	Kuala Lumpur, Malaysia	15 September 2001

===== Round 1 =====
Qualification rule: The first there finishers in each heat (Q) plus the two fastest times of those who finished four or lower in their heat (q) qualified.

====== Heat 1 ======
- November 14, 08:00

Rank	Lane	Athlete	Time	Notes
1	4	Laphassaporn Tawoncharoen (THA)	24.29	Q
2	5	Vu Thi Huong (VIE)	24.35	Q
3	3	Kay Khaing Lwin (MYA)	24.71	Q
4	2	Rostina (INA)	25.03	q
5	6	Norjannah Hafiszah Jamaluddin (MAS)	25.80	

====== Heat 2 ======
- November 14, 08:05

Rank	Lane	Athlete	Time	Notes
1	6	Neeranuch Klomdee (THA)	24.52	Q
2	5	Le Ngoc Phuong (VIE)	24.60	Q
3	3	Nurul Sarah Abdul Kadir (MAS)	24.99	Q
4	7	Tri Setyo Utami (INA)	25.10	q
5	4	Lai Lai Win (MYA)	25.90	
6	2	Valerie Seema Pereira (SIN)	33.09	

===== FINAL =====
- November 14, 18:40
- Wind: +1.4 m/s

Rank	Lane	Athlete	Time	Notes
1st place, gold medalist(s)	3	Laphassaporn Tawoncharoen (THA)	23.65	
2nd place, silver medalist(s)	6	Le Ngoc Phuong (VIE)	24.01	
3rd place, bronze medalist(s)	4	Vu Thi Huong (VIE)	24.06	
4	5	Neeranuch Klomdee (THA)	24.11	
5	8	Nurul Sarah Abdul Kadir (MAS)	24.42	
6	7	Kay Khaing Lwin (MYA)	24.52	
7	2	Tri Setyo Utami (INA)	24.53	
8	1	Rostina (INA)	24.99	

==== 400 metres ====
- Records

Prior to this competition, the existing world, Asian, and Southeast Asian Games records were as follows.

World Record	Marita Koch (GDR)	47.60	Canberra, Australia	6 October 1985
Asian Record	Ma Yuqin (CHN)	49.81	Beijing, China	11 September 1993
Games Record	Nguyen Thi Tinh (VIE)	51.83	Hanoi, Vietnam	8 December 2003

===== Round 1 =====
Qualification rule: The first there finishers in each heat (Q) plus the two fastest times of those who finished four or lower in their heat (q) qualified.

====== Heat 1 ======
- November 12, 19:50

Rank	Lane	Athlete	Time	Notes
1	5	Nguyen Thi Thuy (VIE)	56.22	Q
2	3	Kay Khaing Lwin (MYA)	56.36	Q
3	4	Saowalee Kaewchuay (THA)	56.56	Q
4	6	Sulastri (INA)	57.19	q
5	2	Wendy Enn (SIN)	59.42	

====== Heat 2 ======
- November 12, 19:55

Rank	Lane	Athlete	Time	Notes
1	2	Treewadee Yongphan (THA)	55.61	Q
2	5	Yin Yin Khaing (MYA)	56.45	Q
3	4	Nguyen Thi Oanh (VIE)	56.60	Q
4	3	Nining Souhaly (INA)	58.20	q
5	6	Charlene Oh (SIN)	1:03.74	

===== FINAL =====
- November 13, 19:15

Rank	Lane	Athlete	Time	Notes
1st place, gold medalist(s)	6	Treewadee Yongphan (THA)	54.13	
2nd place, silver medalist(s)	4	Nguyen Thi Thuy (VIE)	54.27	
3rd place, bronze medalist(s)	3	Kay Khaing Lwin (MYA)	55.28	
4	7	Nguyen Thi Oanh (VIE)	55.36	
5	2	Sulastri (INA)	55.93	
6	8	Saowalee Kaewchuay (THA)	56.39	
7	1	Nining Souhaly (INA)	56.56	
8	5	Yin Yin Khaing (MYA)	57.24	

==== 800 metres ====
- Records

Prior to this competition, the existing world, Asian, and Southeast Asian Games records were as follows.

World Record	Jarmila Kratochvílová (TCH)	1:53.28	Munich, West Germany	26 July 1983
Asian Record	Liu Dong (CHN)	1:55.54	Beijing, China	9 September 1993
Games Record	Hang Truong Thanh (VIE)	2:02.39	Nakhon Ratchasima, Thailand	8 December 2007

- November 15, 18:30

Rank	Lane	Athlete	Time	Notes
1st place, gold medalist(s)	4	Truong Thanh Hang (VIE)	2:02.65	
2nd place, silver medalist(s)	5	Do Thi Thao (VIE)	2:05.62	
3rd place, bronze medalist(s)	7	Olivia Sadi (INA)	2:08.41	
4	6	Aye Aye Than (MYA)	2:10.84	
5	3	Ganthi Manthi Kuma (MAS)	2:12.31	
6	2	Nurainun Perangin (INA)	2:22.49	

==== 1500 metres ====
- Records

Prior to this competition, the existing world, Asian, and Southeast Asian Games records were as follows.

World Record	Qu Yunxia (CHN)	3:50.46	Beijing, China	11 September 1993
Asian Record	Qu Yunxia (CHN)	3:50.46	Beijing, China	11 September 1993
Games Record	Hang Truong Thanh (VIE)	4:11.60	Nakhon Ratchasima, Thailand	7 December 2007

- November 13, 20:15

Rank	Lane	Athlete	Time	Notes
1st place, gold medalist(s)	6	Truong Thanh Hang (VIE)	4:15.75	
2nd place, silver medalist(s)	3	Do Thi Thao (VIE)	4:18.94	
3rd place, bronze medalist(s)	7	Olivia Sadi (INA)	4:21.19	
4	5	Phyu War Thet (MYA)	4:25.35	
5	2	Rini Budiarti (INA)	4:39.37	
6	1	Aye Aye Than (MYA)	4:39.48	
7	4	Amelia (TLS)	5:14.64	

==== 5000 metres ====
- Records

Prior to this competition, the existing world, Asian, and Southeast Asian Games records were as follows.

World Record	Tirunesh Dibaba (ETH)	14:11.15	Beijing, China	6 June 2008
Asian Record	Jiang Bo (CHN)	14:28.09	Shanghai, China	23 October 1997
Games Record	Triyaningsih (INA)	15:54.32	Nakhon Ratchasima, Thailand	8 December 2007

- November 14, 18:20

Rank	Lane	Athlete	Time	Notes
1st place, gold medalist(s)	9	Triyaningsih (INA)	16:06.37	
2nd place, silver medalist(s)	12	Phyu War Thet (MYA)	16:12.23	
3rd place, bronze medalist(s)	5	Rini Budiarti (INA)	16:31.85	
4	7	Khin Mar Se (MYA)	17:40.52	
5	10	Nguyen Thi Phuong (VIE)	17:41.52	
6	3	Jho An Banayag (PHI)	17:46.60	
7	2	Woraphan Nuansri (THA)	17:53.05	
8	4	Marquita (TLS)	19:00.15	
9	11	Amelia (TLS)	19:32.46	
10	6	Souksavanh Malivanh (LAO)	19:44.36	
—	1	Pham Thi Hien (VIE)		DNS
—	8	Saywaeo Sontiya (THA)		DNS

==== 10000 metres ====
- Records

Prior to this competition, the existing world, Asian, and Southeast Asian Games records were as follows.

World Record	Wang Junxia (CHN)	29:31.78	Beijing, China	8 September 1993
Asian Record	Wang Junxia (CHN)	29:31.78	Beijing, China	8 September 1993
Games Record	Triyaningsih (INA)	32:49.47	Vientiane, Laos	17 December 2009

- November 12, 17:30

Rank	Lane	Athlete	Time	Notes
1st place, gold medalist(s)	4	Triyaningsih (INA)	34:52.74	
2nd place, silver medalist(s)	3	Pham Thi Binh (VIE)	36:04.83	
3rd place, bronze medalist(s)	5	Pham Thi Hien (VIE)	36:16.84	
4	1	Ni Lar San (MYA)	37:12.37	
5	2	Satianathan Renuka (SIN)	38:50.61	

==== 100 m hurdles ====
- Records

Prior to this competition, the existing world, Asian, and Southeast Asian Games records were as follows.

World Record	Yordanka Donkova (BUL)	12.21	Stara Zagora, Bulgaria	20 August 1988
Asian Record	Olga Shishigina (KAZ)	12.44	Lucerne, Switzerland	27 June 1995
Games Record	Trecia Roberts (THA)	12.85	Bandar Seri Begawan, Brunei	9 August 1999

===== Round 1 =====
Qualification rule: The first there finishers in each heat (Q) plus the two fastest times of those who finished four or lower in their heat (q) qualified.

====== Heat 1 ======
- November 13, 09:00

Rank	Lane	Athlete	Time	Notes
1	4	Wallapa Punsoongneun (THA)	13.72	Q
2	5	Sheena Atilano (PHI)	13.98	Q
3	6	Agustina Bawele (INA)	13.98	Q
4	3	Qcao Thi Hang (VIE)	13.99	q
5	2	Dipna Lim Prasad (SIN)	14.44	

====== Heat 2 ======
- November 13, 09:05

Rank	Lane	Athlete	Time	Notes
1	5	Dedeh Erawati (INA)	13.62	Q
2	2	Bach Phuong Thao (VIE)	14.03	Q
3	3	Wassana Winatho (THA)	14.13	Q
4	4	Raja Nursheena Raja Azhar (MAS)	14.40	q

===== FINAL =====
- November 13, 19:00

Rank	Lane	Athlete	Time	Notes
1st place, gold medalist(s)	4	Wallapa Punsoongneun (THA)	13.51	
2nd place, silver medalist(s)	6	Dedeh Erawati (INA)	13.53	
3rd place, bronze medalist(s)	8	Wassana Winatho (THA)	13.77	
4	1	Qcao Thi Hang (VIE)	13.85	
5	3	Sheena Atilano (PHI)	13.85	
6	7	Agustina Bawele (INA)	14.12	
7	2	Raja Nursheena Raja Azhar (MAS)	14.22	
8	5	Bach Phuong Thao (VIE)	14.47	

==== 400 m hurdles ====
- Records

Prior to this competition, the existing world, Asian, and Southeast Asian Games records were as follows.

World Record	Yuliya Pechonkina (RUS)	52.34	Tula, Russia	8 August 2003
Asian Record	Han Qing (CHN); Song Yinglan (CHN)	53.96	Beijing, China; Guangzhou, China	9 September 1993; 22 November 2001
Games Record	Reawadee Srithao (THA)	56.78	Manila, Philippines	2 December 1991

- November 15, 17:45

Rank	Lane	Athlete	Time	Notes
1st place, gold medalist(s)	3	Noraseela Khalid (MAS)	57.41	
2nd place, silver medalist(s)	4	Wassana Winatho (THA)	58.97	
3rd place, bronze medalist(s)	5	Melissa Hetharie Viera (INA)	59.64	NR
4	6	Nguyen Thi Huyen (VIE)	59.73	
5	2	Nguyen Thi Oanh (VIE)	1:00.61	
6	1	Maryati (INA)	1:01.60	
7	8	Panida Rattanachan (THA)	1:01.95	
8	7	Thirualkarasu Piriyah (SIN)	1:03.49	

==== 3000 metre steeplechase ====
- Records

Prior to this competition, the existing world, Asian, and Southeast Asian Games records were as follows.

World Record	Gulnara Samitova-Galkina (RUS)	8:58.81	Beijing, China	17 August 2008
Asian Record	Liu Nian (CHN)	9:26.25	Wuhan, China	2 November 2007
Games Record	Inaugural Event			

- November 12–19.15
- FINAL

Rank	Lane	Athlete	Time	Notes
1st place, gold medalist(s)	5	Rini Budiarti (INA)	10:00.58	GR NR
2nd place, silver medalist(s)	4	Nguyen Thi Phuong (THA)	10:04.42	
3rd place, bronze medalist(s)	1	Yulianingsih (INA)	10:48.97	
4	6	Melinder Kaur Ragb (MAS)	11:32.49	
5	3	Khin Mar Se (MYA)	12:46.63	
6	7	Malivanh Souksavanh (LAO)	12:56.40	
—	2	Saywaeo Sontiya (THA)	DNF	

==== 4x100 metres ====
- Records

Prior to this competition, the existing world, Asian, and Southeast Asian Games records were as follows.

World Record	East Germany	41.37	Canberra, Australia	6 October 1985
Asian Record	China	42.23	Shanghai, China	23 October 1997
Games Record	Thailand	44.00	Nakhon Ratchasima, Thailand	10 December 2007

- November 15, 19:40

Rank	Lane	Nation	Competitors	Time	Notes
1st place, gold medalist(s)	3	Thailand (THA)	Phatsorn Jaksuninkorn, Neeranuch Klomdee, Laphassaporn Tawoncharoen, Nongnuch Sanrat	44.40	
2nd place, silver medalist(s)	1	Indonesia (INA)	Nurul Imaniar, Tri Setyo Utami, Serafi Anelies Unani, Dedeh Erawati	45.00	NR
3rd place, bronze medalist(s)	2	Vietnam (VIE)	Le Thi Mong Tuyen, Le Ngoc Phuong, Truong Thanh Hang, Vu Thi Huong	45.12	
4	4	Malaysia (MAS)	Zaidatul Husna Zulkifli, Nurul Sarah Abdul Kadir, Komalam Sally Selveretnam, Norjannah Hafiszah Jamaluddin	45.46	

==== 4x400 metres ====
- Records

Prior to this competition, the existing world, Asian, and Southeast Asian Games records were as follows.

World Record	Soviet Union	3:15.17	Seoul, South Korea	1 October 1988
Asian Record	China	3:24.28	Beijing, China	13 September 1993
Games Record	Thailand	3:35.53	Manila, Philippines	3 December 1991

- November 14, 19:40

Rank	Lane	Nation	Competitors	Time	Notes
1st place, gold medalist(s)	4	Thailand (THA)	Saowalee Kawchuay, Pornpan Hoemhuk, Laphassaporn Tawoncharoen, Treewadee Yongphan	3:41.35	
2nd place, silver medalist(s)	2	Indonesia (INA)	Sulastri, Melissa Hetharie Viera, Musyafidah, Nining Souhaly	3:44.65	
3rd place, bronze medalist(s)	5	Vietnam (VIE)	Nguyen Thi Thuy, Nguyen Thi Oanh, Nguyen Thi Huyen, Nguyen Thi Thuy	3:45.03	
4	6	Myanmar (MYA)	Yin Yin Khine, Aye Aye Than, Naw Ka Paw Phaw, Kay Khaing Lwin	3:45.46	
5	3	Singapore (SIN)	Nikita Sharda, Wendy Enn, Thirualkarasu Piriyah, Dipna Lim Prasad	3:54.57	

==== Marathon ====
- Records

Prior to this competition, the existing world, Asian, and Southeast Asian Games records were as follows.

World Record	Paula Radcliffe (GBR)	2:15:25	London, United Kingdom	13 April 2003
Asian Record	Mizuki Noguchi (JPN)	2:19:12	Berlin, Germany	25 September 2005
Games Record	Ruwiyati (INA)	2:34:29	Chiang Mai, Thailand	13 December 1995

- November 16, 05:30

Rank	Athlete	Time	Notes
1st place, gold medalist(s)	Triyaningsih (INA)	2:45:35	
2nd place, silver medalist(s)	Ni Lar San (MYA)	2:46:37	
3rd place, bronze medalist(s)	Pham Thi Binh (VIE)	2:48:43	
4	Jho An Banayag (PHI)	2:50:40	
−	Juventina (TLS)	DNF	
—	Anne Qi Hui (SIN)	DNF	
—	Pham Thi Hien (VIE)	DNS	

==== 20 km walk ====
- Records

Prior to this competition, the existing world, Asian, and Southeast Asian Games records were as follows.

World Record	Elena Lashmanova (RUS)	1:25:02	London, United Kingdom	11 August 2012
Asian Record	Shenjie Qieyang (CHN)	1:25:16	London, United Kingdom	11 August 2012
Games Record	Yuan Yu Fang (MAS)	1:39:25	Hanoi, Vietnam	11 December 2003

- November 13, 06:00

Rank	Athlete	Time	Notes
1st place, gold medalist(s)	Nguyen Thi Thanh Phuc (VIE)	1:43:22	
2nd place, silver medalist(s)	Kay Khaing Myo Tun (MYA)	1:45:19	
3rd place, bronze medalist(s)	Darwati (INA)	1:46:04	
4	Yuan Yu Fang (MAS)	1:48:29	
5	Inayati (INA)	1:55:17	
6	Tanaphon Assawawongcharoen (THA)	1:58:49	
7	Norliana Binti Mohd Rusni (MAS)	2:03:42	

=== Field events ===
==== High jump ====
- Records

Prior to this competition, the existing world, Asian, and Southeast Asian Games records were as follows.

World Record	Stefka Kostadinova (BUL)	2.09	Rome, Italy	30 August 1987
Asian Record	Marina Aitova (KAZ)	1.99	Athens, Greece	13 July 2009
Games Record	Noeng-ruthai Chaipech (THA)	1.94	Vientiane, Laos	14 December 2009

- November 13, 18.00

Rank	Athlete	1.65	1.70	1.75	1.80	1.84	1.87	1.90	1.92	Result	Notes
1st place, gold medalist(s)	Duong Thi Viet Anh (VIE)	—	—	O	O	O	O	XO	XXX	1.90	
2nd place, silver medalist(s)	Wanida Boonwan (THA)	—	O	O	O	XO	XO	XXX		1.87	
3rd place, bronze medalist(s)	Pham Thi Diem (VIE)	—	O	O	O	XO	XXO	XXX		1.87	
4	Noeng-ruthai Chaipech (THA)	—	XO	O	O	XO	XXX			1.84	
5	Ika Puspadewi (INA)	XO	XXX							1.65	

==== Pole vault ====
- Records

Prior to this competition, the existing world, Asian, and Southeast Asian Games records were as follows.

World Record	Yelena Isinbayeva (RUS)	5.06 m	Zurich, Switzerland	28 August 2009
Asian Record	Li Ling (CHN)	4.65 m	Shenyang, China	8 September 2013
Games Record	Roslinda Samsu (MAS)	4.15 m	Vientiane, Laos	17 December 2009

- November 15, 17.30

Rank	Athlete	3.40	3.60	3.70	3.80	3.90	4.00	4.10	4.20	4.25	Result	Notes
1st place, gold medalist(s)	Roslinda Samsu (MAS)	—	—	—	O	O	O	O	O	XXX	4.20	GR
2nd place, silver medalist(s)	Le Thi Phuong (VIE)	—	—	—	XO	O	O	O	O	XXX	4.20	GR NR
3rd place, bronze medalist(s)	Ni Putu Desi Margawati (INA)	—	—	O	O	XXO	XXX				3.90	
4	Riezel Buenaventura (PHI)	O	XO	O	XO	XXO	XXX				3.90	
5	Sukanya Chomchuendee (THA)	—	O	—	O	XXX					3.80	
—	Rachel Isabel Yang Bingjie (THA)										DNS	

==== Long jump ====
- Records

Prior to this competition, the existing world, Asian, and Southeast Asian Games records were as follows.

World Record	Galina Chistyakova (URS)	7.52	Leningrad, Soviet Union	11 June 1988
Asian Record	Yao Weili (CHN)	7.01	Jinan, China	5 June 1993
Games Record	Marestella Torres (PHI)	6.68	Vientiane, Laos	16 December 2009

Rank	Athlete	Attempts						Result	Notes
Rank	Athlete	1	2	3	4	5	6	Result	Notes
1st place, gold medalist(s)	Marestella Torres (PHI)	6.65; 0.6	X	6.71; 1.1	X	X	6.61; 0.0	6.71	GR NR
2nd place, silver medalist(s)	Maria Natalia Londa (INA)	X	X	6.22; 1.4	6.47; 1.1	X	6.42; 0.0	6.47	NR
3rd place, bronze medalist(s)	Katherine Khay Santos (PHI)	X	6.04; 0.4	6.25; 0.9	5.98; 0.0	6.03 -0.5	6.03 -0.1	6.25	
4	Thitima Muangjan (THA)	6.10; 0.6	6.19; 0.0	X	X	X	5.94 -0.2	6.19	
5	Bui Thi Thu Thao (VIE)	6.10; 1.1	6.11; 0.4	6.08; 0.8	5.88; 0.6	X	5.97; 0.7	6.11	
6	Sirada Seechaichana (THA)	6.02; 0.3	5.85; 0.6	5.71; 1.8	5.84; 0.6	6.01; 0.2	5.99; 0.3	6.02	
7	Nurul Fatimatul Zahra Awang (MAS)	X	5.97; 0.9	5.87; 1.8	5.92; 0.8	X	X	5.97	
8	Nova Aprilia Abdurroni (INA)	5.86; 0.6	5.80; 0.6	5.91; 1.1	5.62; 0.8	5.90; 0.5	5.69; 0.9	5.91	

==== Triple jump ====
- Records

Prior to this competition, the existing world, Asian, and Southeast Asian Games records were as follows.

World Record	Inessa Kravets (UKR)	15.50	Gothenburg, Sweden	10 August 1995
Asian Record	Olga Rypakova (KAZ)	15.25	Split, Croatia	4 September 2010
Games Record	Thitima Muangjan (THA)	14.08	Vientiane, Laos	14 December 2009

- November 14, 19.30

Rank	Athlete	Attempts						Result	Notes
Rank	Athlete	1	2	3	4	5	6	Result	Notes
1st place, gold medalist(s)	Tran Hue Hoa (VIE)	13.51 -0.4	13.76 -0.5	13.28; 0.2	13.67; 0.4	13.75 -0.5	13.75; 1.1	13.76	NR
2nd place, silver medalist(s)	Maria Natalia Londa (INA)	13.33; 0.3	13.41; 1.4	13.73; 0.6	13.32; 0.5	12.63; 0.3	12.92; 0.4	13.73	NR
3rd place, bronze medalist(s)	Thitima Muangjan (THA)	13.64; 0.7	13.64 -0.6	13.29 -0.6	13.53 -0.6	13.27; 0.7	13.53; 0.2	13.64	
4	Sirada Seechaichana (THA)	13.18; 0.4	13.04 -0.5	X	X	X	X	13.18	

==== Shot put ====
- Records

Prior to this competition, the existing world, Asian, and Southeast Asian Games records were as follows.

World Record	Natalya Lisovskaya (URS)	22.63	Moscow, Soviet Union	7 June 1987
Asian Record	Li Meisu (CHN)	21.76	Shijiazhuang, China	23 April 1988
Games Record	Du Xianhui (SIN)	18.20	Hanoi, Vietnam	7 December 2003

- November 14, 19.20

Rank	Athlete	Attempts						Result	Notes
Rank	Athlete	1	2	3	4	5	6	Result	Notes
1st place, gold medalist(s)	Zhang Guirong (SIN)	16.15	16.96	X	16.58	16.63	X	16.96	
2nd place, silver medalist(s)	Wan Laychi (SIN)	13.88	14.03	14.55	14.12	14.25	14.59	14.59	
3rd place, bronze medalist(s)	Juttaporn Krasaeyan (THA)	13.82	14.18	14.30	14.11	13.92	14.37	14.37	
4	Sawitri Thongchao (THA)	12.77	X	X	13.24	13.54	13.74	13.74	
5	Dewi Lantari (INA)	13.10	12.91	12.64	13.15	12.47	12.28	13.15	
6	Eki Febri Ekawati (INA)	X	13.00	X	13.08	11.95	12.59	13.08	

==== Discus throw ====
- Records

Prior to this competition, the existing world, Asian, and Southeast Asian Games records were as follows.

World Record	Gabriele Reinsch (GDR)	76.80	Neubrandenburg, East Germany	9 July 1988
Asian Record	Xiao Yanling (CHN)	71.68	Beijing, China	14 March 1992
Games Record	Juttaporn Krasaeyan (THA)	51.48	Bandar Seri Begawan, Brunei	11 August 1999

- November 15, 18.30

Rank	Athlete	Attempts						Result	Notes
Rank	Athlete	1	2	3	4	5	6	Result	Notes
1st place, gold medalist(s)	Subenrat Insaeng (THA)	51.44	X	X	49.76	51.31	52.25	52.25	GR
2nd place, silver medalist(s)	Dwi Ratnawati (INA)	39.15	12.67	49.98	44.77	44.77	X	49.98	
3rd place, bronze medalist(s)	Zhang Guirong (SIN)	45.46	46.26	44.28	42.22	48.22	47.20	48.22	
4	Wan Laychi (SIN)	44.09	46.79	X	X	46.53	45.00	46.79	
5	Juttaporn Krasaeyan (THA)	42.32	43.93	X	X	44.67	X	44.67	
6	Yap Jeng Tzan (MAS)	X	41.84	X	X	X	X	41.84	

==== Hammer throw ====
- Records

Prior to this competition, the existing world, Asian, and Southeast Asian Games records were as follows.

World Record	Betty Heidler (GER)	79.42m	Halle, Germany	21 May 2011
Asian Record	Zhang Wenxiu (CHN)	76.99m	Ostrava, Czech Republic	24 May 2012
Games Record	Tan Song Hwa (MAS)	56.41m	Vientiane, Laos	15 December 2009

- November 12, 17.00

Rank	Athlete	Attempts						Result	Notes
Rank	Athlete	1	2	3	4	5	6	Result	Notes
1st place, gold medalist(s)	Tan Song Hwa (MAS)	55.08	X	X	55.15	X	—	55.15	
2nd place, silver medalist(s)	Rose Herlinda Inggriana (INA)	X	49.40	51.95	X	51.11	50.15	51.95	
3rd place, bronze medalist(s)	Loralie Sermona (PHI)	X	X	X	48.49	47.38	49.69	49.69	
4	Sunisa Boonprasarn (SIN)	44.51	47.38	45.04	X	47.68	46.03	47.68	
5	Panwat Gimsrang (THA)	46.65	45.57	47.36	45.74	45.78	42.73	47.36	
6	Math Thinmanao (LAO)	X	X	27.50	26.48	27.18	28.27	28.27	

==== Javelin throw ====
- Records

Prior to this competition, the existing world, Asian, and Southeast Asian Games records were as follows.

World Record	Barbora Špotáková (CZE)	72.28m	Stuttgart, Germany	13 September 2008
Asian Record	Lü Huihui (CHN)	65.62m	Zhaoqing, China	27 April 2013
Games Record	Buoban Pamang (THA)	55.97m	Nakhon Ratchasima, Thailand	7 December 2007

- November 13, 18.00

Rank	Athlete	Attempts						Result	Notes
Rank	Athlete	1	2	3	4	5	6	Result	Notes
1st place, gold medalist(s)	Natta Nachan (THA)	46.95	47.69	48.80	X	47.94	47.11	48.80	
2nd place, silver medalist(s)	Rosie Villarito (PHI)	45.18	47.35	45.79	X	X	46.57	47.35	
3rd place, bronze medalist(s)	Saowalak Pettong (THA)	X	X	44.49	45.29	46.73	46.36	46.73	
4	Bui Thi Xuan (VIE)	44.91	46.20	46.32	46.50	46.25	44.59	46.50	
5	Dian Kartika Sari (INA)	40.95	41.99	43.85	X	40.26	41.07	43.85	
6	Math Thinmanao (LAO)	X	35.47	36.71	36.17	38.70	36.78	38.70	

==== Heptathlon ====
- Records

Prior to this competition, the existing world, Asian, and Southeast Asian Games records were as follows.

World Record	Jackie Joyner-Kersee (USA)	7291	Seoul, South Korea	23–24 September 1988
Asian Record	Ghada Shouaa (SYR)	6942	Götzis, Austria	26 May 1996
Games Record	Wassana Winatho (THA)	5889	Nakhon Ratchasima, Thailand	11 December 2007

- 100 m hurdles

November 14, 07:00

Rank	Lane	Athlete	Time	Points	Notes
1	7	Wassana Winatho (THA)	14.19	952	
2	5	Duong Thi Viet Anh (VIE)	14.99	843	
3	6	Bui Thi Thu Thao (VIE)	15.02	839	
4	4	Rohimayati (INA)	15.07	832	
5	2	Sunisa Khotseemueang (THA)	15.44	784	
6	3	Narcisa Atienza (PHI)	15.66	769	

- High Jump

November 14, 08:30

Rank	Athlete	1.30	1.33	1.36	1.39	1.42	1.45	1.48	1.51	1.54	1.57	1.60	1.63	1.66	1.69	1.72	1.75	1.78	1.81	1.84	1.87	1.90	1.93	Result	Points	Notes	Overall	Overall Rank
1	Duong Thi Viet Anh (VIE)	—	—	—	—	—	—	—	—	—	—	—	—	O	—	—	O	—	O	O	XO	O	XXX	1.90	1106		1949	1
2	Wassana Winatho (THA)	—	—	—	—	—	—	—	—	—	—	O	—	O	—	O	O	XXX						1.75	916		1868	2
3	Narcisa Atienza (PHI)	—	—	—	—	—	—	—	—	—	—	O	—	XO	O	O	XO	XXX						1.75	916		1685	3
4	Bui Thi Thu Thao (VIE)	—	—	—	—	—	O	O	O	O	O	XXX												1.57	701		1540	4
5	Sunisa Khotseemueang (THA)	—	—	—	—	—	O	O	O	O	XXX													1.54	666		1450	5
6	Rohimayati (INA)	O	XO	O	XO	XO	O	XXX																1.45	566		1398	6

- Shot Put

November 14, 18:00

Rank	Athlete	1	2	3	Result	Points	Notes	Overall	Overall Rank
1	Narcisa Atienza (PHI)	12.15	12.15	X	12.15	671		2356	3
2	Sunisa Khotseemueang (THA)	11.94	8.87	10.80	11.94	657		2107	4
3	Wassana Winatho (THA)	11.02	11.63	11.52	11.63	637		2505	1
4	Bui Thi Thu Thao (VIE)	X	10.51	X	10.51	563		2103	5
5	Duong Thi Viet Anh (VIE)	9.69	9.12	9.99	9.99	529		2478	2
6	Rohimayati (INA)	9.26	9.58	9.67	9.67	508		1906	6

- 200 metres

November 14, 19:20
Wind: 1.2 m/s

Rank	Lane	Athlete	Time	Points	Notes	Overall	Overall Rank
1	2	Wassana Winatho (THA)	24.91	895		3400	1
2	6	Bui Thi Thu Thao (VIE)	25.61	832		2935	4
3	7	Duong Thi Viet Anh (VIE)	26.07	791		3269	2
4	4	Sunisa Khotseemueang (THA)	26.20	780		2887	5
5	5	Narcisa Atienza (PHI)	26.41	762		3118	3
6	3	Rohimayati (INA)	26.58	747		2653	6

- Long jump

November 15, 16:00

Rank	Athlete	1	2	3	Result	Points	Notes	Overall	Overall Rank
1	Bui Thi Thu Thao (VIE)	X	5.84; 0.2	5.95; 0.4	5.95	834		3769	4
2	Duong Thi Viet Anh (VIE)	X	X	5.90; 0.3	5.90	819		4088	2
3	Wassana Winatho (THA)	X	5.47 -0.6	5.85; 1.1	5.85	804		4204	1
4	Narcisa Atienza (PHI)	X	5.73 -0.2	X	5.73	768		3886	3
5	Sunisa Khotseemueang (THA)	4.94; 0.1	X	5.39; 1.1	5.39	668		3555	5
6	Rohimayati (INA)	5.12; 0.6	5.26 -0.3	5.15; 0.9	5.26	631		3284	6

- Javelin throw

November 15, 17:30

Rank	Athlete	1	2	3	Result	Points	Notes	Overall	Overall Rank
1	Narcisa Atienza (PHI)	43.17	X	X	43.17	728		4614	3
2	Sunisa Khotseemueang (THA)	X	39.51	31.91	39.51	658		4213	5
3	Wassana Winatho (THA)	32.81	36.02	—	36.02	591		4795	1
4	Duong Thi Viet Anh (VIE)	31.14	34.06	28.65	34.06	554		4642	2
5	Bui Thi Thu Thao (VIE)	28.76	33.01	29.40	33.01	534		4303	5
6	Rohimayati (INA)	31.98	25.12	X	31.98	514		3798	6

- 800 metres

November 15, 19:00

Rank	Lane	Athlete	Time	Points	Notes
1	1	Wassana Winatho (THA)	2:29.97	693	
2	3	Narcisa Atienza (PHI)	2:31.72	671	
3	6	Sunisa Khotseemueang (THA)	2:35.37	627	
4	4	Duong Thi Viet Anh (VIE)	2:41.62	554	
5	2	Rohimayati (INA)	2:44.18	526	
6	5	Bui Thi Thu Thao (VIE)	3:06.67	306	

- OVERALL RESULTS

The final results of the event are in the following table.

The highest mark recorded in each event is highlighted in yellow

Rank	Athlete	100m H	HJ	SP	200m	LJ	JT	800m	Points	Notes
1st place, gold medalist(s)	Wassana Winatho (THA)	952; 14.19	916; 1.75	637; 11.63	895; 24.91	804; 5.85	591; 36.02	693; 2:29.97	5488	
2nd place, silver medalist(s)	Narcisa Atienza (PHI)	769; 15.56	916; 1.75	671; 12.15	762; 26.41	768; 5.73	728; 43.17	671; 2:31.72	5285	
3rd place, bronze medalist(s)	Duong Thi Viet Anh (VIE)	843; 14.99	1106; 1.90	529; 9.99	791; 26.07	819; 5.90	554; 34.06	554; 2:41.62	5196	
4	Sunisa Khotseemueang (THA)	784; 15.44	666; 1.54	657; 11.94	780; 26.20	668; 5.39	658; 39.51	627; 2:35.37	4840	
5	Bui Thi Thu Thao (VIE)	839; 15.02	701; 1.57	563; 10.51	832; 25.61	834; 5.95	534; 33.01	306; 3:06.67	4609	
6	Rohimayati (INA)	832; 15.07	566; 1.45	508; 9.67	747; 26.58	631; 5.26	514; 31.98	526; 2:44.18	4324	
