= Athletics at the 2009 SEA Games – Results =

These are the full results from the athletics competition at the 2009 SEA Games.

== Men ==
=== Track Events ===
==== 100 metres ====
- December 13 - Round One Heats
- December 13 - FINAL
- Heat 1

Rank	Lane	Runner	NOC	Time	Notes
1	3	Suryo Agung Wibowo	(Indonesia)	10.69	Q
2	6	Wattana Deewong	(Thailand)	10.81	Q
3	5	Amirudin Jamal	(Singapore)	10.83	Q
4	2	Sar Chupveasna	(Cambodia)	11.20	
5	4	Kilakone	(Laos)	11.24	

- Heat 2

Rank	Lane	Runner	NOC	Time	Notes
1	4	Wachara Sondee	(Thailand)	10.61	Q
2	5	Mohd Noor Imran	(Malaysia)	10.65	Q
3	2	Poh Seng Song	(Singapore)	10.73	Q
4	6	Fadlin	(Indonesia)	10.75	Q
5	3	Bui Duy Thuong	(Vietnam)	10.90	Q
6	7	Chaleunsouk	(Laos)	11.18	

- FINAL

Rank	Lane	Runner	NOC	Time	Note
1st place, gold medalist(s)	4	Suryo Agung Wibowo	(Indonesia)	10.17	GR
2nd place, silver medalist(s)	5	Wachara Sondee	(Thailand)	10.30	
3rd place, bronze medalist(s)	2	Fadlin	(Indonesia)	10.61	
4	8	Amirudin Jamal	(Singapore)	10.62	
5	7	Poh Seng Song	(Singapore)	10.70	
6	6	Mohd Noor Imran	(Malaysia)	10.71	
7	3	Wattana Deewong	(Thailand)	10.73	
8	1	Bui Duy Thuong	(Vietnam)	10.89	

==== 200 metres ====
- December 15 - Round One Heats
- December 16 - FINAL
- Heat 1

Rank	Lane	Runner	NOC	Time	Notes
1	4	Sittichai Suwonprateep	(Thailand)	21.49	Q
2	2	Sar Chupveasna	(Cambodia)	22.94	Q
3	3	Fadlin	(Indonesia)	22.97	Q
4	4	Souksavanh Tonsaktheva	(Laos)	23.48	Q

- Heat 2

Rank	Lane	Runner	NOC	Time	Notes
1	6	Suryo Agung Wibowo	(Indonesia)	21.29	Q
2	4	Suppachai Chimdee	(Thailand)	21.51	Q
3	2	Mohd Noor Imran	(Malaysia)	22.49	Q
4	3	Bui Duy Thuong	(Vietnam)	22.76	Q
5	5	Alousana Souvannalat	(Laos)	42.00	

- FINAL

Rank	Lane	Runner	NOC	Time	Note
1st place, gold medalist(s)	4	Suryo Agung Wibowo	(Indonesia)	20.85	
2nd place, silver medalist(s)	3	Sittichai Suwonprateep	(Thailand)	21.12	
3rd place, bronze medalist(s)	5	Suppachai Chimdee	(Thailand)	21.24	
4	8	Mohd Noor Imran	(Malaysia)	21.60	
5	7	Fadlin	(Indonesia)	22.25	
6	1	Bui Duy Thuong	(Vietnam)	22.56	
7	6	Sar Chupveasna	(Cambodia)	22.85	
8	2	Souksavanh Tonsaktheva	(Laos)	23.44	

==== 400 metres ====
- December 17 - FINAL
- FINAL

Rank	Lane	Runner	NOC	Time	Note
1st place, gold medalist(s)	5	Mohd Zafril	(Malaysia)	47.11	
2nd place, silver medalist(s)	7	Heru Astriyanto	(Indonesia)	47.35	
3rd place, bronze medalist(s)	2	Jukkatip Pojaroen	(Thailand)	47.53	
4	1	Yuvaaraj Panerselvam	(Malaysia)	47.61	
5	6	Julius Nierras	(Philippines)	47.89	
6	4	Chanatip Ruckburee	(Thailand)	48.09	
7	3	Junrey Bano	(Philippines)	48.83	
8	8	Kethsada Phengsavath	(Laos)	52.18	

==== 800 metres ====
- December 14 - FINAL
- FINAL

Rank	Lane	Runner	NOC	Time	Note
1st place, gold medalist(s)	1	Nguyen Dinh Cuong	(Vietnam)	1:50.65	
2nd place, silver medalist(s)	6	Mohd Jironi Riduan	(Malaysia)	1:50.98	
3rd place, bronze medalist(s)	6	S. Mathialagan	(Malaysia)	1:51.75	
4	7	J. Pattasai	(Thailand)	1:51.82	
5	2	W. Waekachi	(Thailand)	1:52.22	
6	8	Nelbert Ducusin	(Philippines)	1:52.82	
7	8	Midel Dique	(Philippines)	1:55.49	
8	3	Kyaw Laun Aung	(Myanmar)	1:55.79	
9	5	Mai Van Van	(Vietnam)	1:56.32	
10	4	Anousone A.	(Laos)	2:03.61	
11	4	Anousone S.	(Laos)	2:12.87	

==== 1500 metres ====
- December 17 - FINAL
- FINAL

Rank	Lane	Runner	NOC	Time	Notes
1st place, gold medalist(s)	2	Nguyen Dinh Cuong	(Vietnam)	3:46.58	
2nd place, silver medalist(s)	8	Mohd Jironi Riduan	(Malaysia)	3:47.34	
3rd place, bronze medalist(s)	3	Vadivellan Mahendran	(Malaysia)	3:48.99	
4	6	Patikarn Pechsricha	(Thailand)	4:00.16	
5	5	Nelbert Ducusin	(Philippines)	4:05.10	
6	4	Saysana Bannavong	(Laos)	4:06.84	
7	7	Nguyen Van Ly	(Vietnam)	-	DNF
8	1	Boonthung Srisung	(Thailand)	-	DNS

==== 5000 metres ====
- December 13 - FINAL
- FINAL

Rank	Lane	Runner	NOC	Time	Note
1st place, gold medalist(s)	3	Aung Khaing	(Myanmar)	14:43.12	
2nd place, silver medalist(s)	5	Boonthung Srisung	(Thailand)	14:50.71	
3rd place, bronze medalist(s)	4	Julius Sermona	(Philippines)	14:59.85	
4	1	Priv. Kyi Min Soe	(Myanmar)	15:17.04	
5	8	Sanchai Namkhet	(Thailand)	15:21.89	
6	2	Hem Bunting	(Cambodia)	15:45.63	
7	9	Saysana	(Laos)	16:20.50	
8	6	Ribeiro Pinto De C	(Timor-Leste)	17:32.11	
9	7	Sean Sopheak	(Cambodia)	17:32.11	

==== 10,000 metres ====
- December 16 - FINAL
- FINAL

Rank	Lane	Runner	NOC	Time	Note
1st place, gold medalist(s)	10	Agus Prayogo	(Indonesia)	29:51.40	
2nd place, silver medalist(s)	6	Jauhari Johan	(Indonesia)	30:10.52	
3rd place, bronze medalist(s)	8	Boonthung Srisung	(Thailand)	30:25.75	
4	5	Aung Thura	(Myanmar)	30:40.29	
5	9	Aung Khaing	(Myanmar)	31:31.50	
6	2	Sanchai Namkhet	(Thailand)	32:21.79	
7	4	Julius Sermona	(Philippines)	33:13.64	
8	3	Rene Herrera	(Philippines)	00:00.00	DNS
9	1	Augusto Ramor Soar	(Timor-Leste)	00:00.00	DNS
10	7	Hem Bunting	(Cambodia)	00:00.00	DNS

==== 110 metre hurdles ====
- December 16 - FINAL
- FINAL

Rank	Lane	Runner	NOC	Time	Note
1st place, gold medalist(s)	6	Jamras Rittidet	(Thailand)	13.89	
2nd place, silver medalist(s)	4	Mohd Robani Hassan	(Malaysia)	14.05	
3rd place, bronze medalist(s)	3	Suphan Wongsriphu	(Thailand)	14.16	
4	5	Muhd Faiz	(Malaysia)	DNF	

==== 400 metre hurdles ====
- December 13 - FINAL
- FINAL

Rank	Lane	Runner	NOC	Time	Note
1st place, gold medalist(s)	4	Narongdech Janjai	(Thailand)	00:52.49	
2nd place, silver medalist(s)	6	Zulkarnain Purba	(Indonesia)	00:53.40	
3rd place, bronze medalist(s)	3	Phatyot Klong-Ngan	(Thailand)	00:54.15	
4	7	Junrey Bano	(Philippines)	00:54.49	
5	5	Saly	(Laos)	00:57.00	
6	2	Phouthaviphone	(Laos)	01:01.76	

==== 3000 metre steeplechase ====
- December 14 - FINAL
- FINAL

Rank	Lane	Runner	NOC	Time	Note
1st place, gold medalist(s)	2	Rene Herrera	(Philippines)	09:11.20	
2nd place, silver medalist(s)	3	Patikarn Pechsricha	(Thailand)	09:27.21	
3rd place, bronze medalist(s)	4	Nguyen Van Ly	(Vietnam)	09:38.80	
4	1	Sysavath	(Laos)	10:13.11	
5	5	Saysana	(Laos)	10:20.49	

==== 4×100 metre relay ====
- December 17 - FINAL

Rank	Lane	Nation	Competitors	Time	Notes
1st place, gold medalist(s)	4	(Thailand)	Jukkatip Pojaroen, Chanatip Ruckburee, Supachai Phachsay, Suppachai Chimdee	39.34	
2nd place, silver medalist(s)	6	(Singapore)	Gary Yeo, Elfi Mustapa, Lee Chong Wei, Amirudin Jamal	39.82	
3rd place, bronze medalist(s)	5	(Indonesia)	Riski Latip, Apip Dwi Cahyono, Fadlin, Suryo Agung Wibowo	40.16	
4	3	(Laos)	?,?,?,?	DNF	

==== 4×400 metre relay ====
- December 14 - FINAL

Rank	Lane	Nation	Competitors	Time	Notes
1st place, gold medalist(s)	4	(Thailand)	Jukkatip Pojaroen, Chanatip Ruckburee, Supachai Phachsay, Suppachai Chimdee	3:08.40	
2nd place, silver medalist(s)	3	(Malaysia)	Zafril Zuslaini, Idris Zakaria, Paneerselvam Yuvaaraj, Zaiful Zainal Abidin	3:10.19	
3rd place, bronze medalist(s)	2	(Laos)	Kethsada Phengsavanh, Saly Kheuabmavong, Kenmanh Chanthavong, Phouthaviphone Phonxaiya	3:26.46	

==== Marathon ====
- December 15 - FINAL
- FINAL

Rank	Lane	Runner	NOC	Time	Notes
1st place, gold medalist(s)	7	Eduardo Banajera Buenavista	(Philippines)	2:21:10.14	
2nd place, silver medalist(s)	4	Yahuza	(Indonesia)	2:21:56.12	
3rd place, bronze medalist(s)	1	Hem Bunting	(Cambodia)	2:25:19.68	NR
4	3	Ari Swadana	(Thailand)	2:27:55.49	
5	10	Augusto Ramor Soar	(Timor-Leste)	2:30:03.34	
6	8	Boonchoo Jandacha	(Thailand)	2:32:13.62	
7	9	Sutat Kallayanakitti	(Thailand)	2:39:40.43	
8	6	Soe Min Thu	(Myanmar)	2:43:01.33	
9	2	Sean Sopheak	(Cambodia)	2:47:49.47	
10	5	Sengkeo Sensuritoay	(Laos)	2:50:53.45	NR
11	11	Kongchay Sathitong	(Laos)	3:05:27.30	

=== Race Walk ===
==== 20 km walk ====
- December 15 - FINAL
- FINAL

Rank	Lane	Runner	NOC	Time	Notes
1st place, gold medalist(s)	5	Teoh Boon Lim	(Malaysia)	01:31:28	
2nd place, silver medalist(s)	1	Indra Abdul Kadir	(Indonesia)	01:32:09	
3rd place, bronze medalist(s)	2	Kristian Lumbang Tobing	(Indonesia)	01:33:35	
4	6	Michael Embuedo	(Philippines)	01:41:54	
5	7	Veerapun Anunchai	(Thailand)	01:46:08	
6	3	Bountome Singlokham	(Laos)	02:00:40	
7	4	Lo Choon Sieng	(Malaysia)		DQ

=== Field Events ===
==== High jump ====
- December 17 - FINAL
- FINAL

Rank	Athlete	NOC	Result	Notes
1st place, gold medalist(s)	Lee Hup Wei	(Malaysia)	2.18m	
2nd place, silver medalist(s)	Pramote Pumurai	(Thailand)	2.14m	
3rd place, bronze medalist(s)	Suchart Singhaklang	(Thailand)	2.10m	
4	Nguyen Duy Bang	(Vietnam)	2.10m	
5	Navinraj Subramaniam	(Malaysia)	2.05m	
6	Syahrial	(Indonesia)	2.05m	

==== Pole vault ====
- December 16 - FINAL

Rank	Jumper	Result	Notes
1st place, gold medalist(s)	(Thailand) Kreeta Sintawacheewa	5.21m	GR
2nd place, silver medalist(s)	(Thailand) Sompong Sombankuay	5.00m	
3rd place, bronze medalist(s)	(Malaysia) Muhd Hafizuddin	4.50m	
4	(Myanmar) Tun Tun Lin		
5	(Laos) Ying Yot Novom		
6	(Singapore) Sean Lim		
7	(Vietnam) Vu Van Huyen		

==== Long jump ====
- December 15 - FINAL

Rank	Athlete	Nationality	1	2	3	4	5	6	Result	Notes
1st place, gold medalist(s)	Supanara Sukhasvasti	Thailand	7.50	X	7.70	X	X	7.83	7.83	
2nd place, silver medalist(s)	Joebert Delicano	Philippines	7.61	7.74	7.61	X	7.72	7.61	7.74	
3rd place, bronze medalist(s)	Henry Dagmil	Philippines	6.97	X	7.53	7.32	X	7.72	7.72	
4	Nguyen Van Mua	Vietnam	7.42	7.65	X	X	7.50	X	7.65	
5	Theerayut Philakong	Thailand	X	X	7.50	X	7.64	X	7.64	
6	Matthew Goh	Singapore	7.62	7.50	X	X	7.41	X	7.62	
7	Nguyen Manh Hieu	Vietnam	6.73	6.84	6.67	6.78	6.95	X	6.95	
8	Sipaseuth Phetsomphou	Laos	5.73	6.75	6.60	X	6.80	6.67	6.80	
9	Khiev Samnang	Cambodia	5.70	6.61	6.62	-	-	-	6.62	
10	Souphalay Sinthalavong	Laos	X	6.08	X	-	-	-	6.08	

==== Triple jump ====
- December 13 - FINAL

Rank	Athlete	Nationality	1	2	3	4	5	6	Result	Notes
1st place, gold medalist(s)	Theerayut Philakong	Thailand	X	X	15.80	15.45	16.25	16.51	16.51	GR
2nd place, silver medalist(s)	Varunyoo Kongnil	Thailand	15.90	X	X	16.29	X	X	16.29	
3rd place, bronze medalist(s)	Joebert Delicano	Philippines	15.84	15.94	15.86	15.89	15.68	16.12	16.12	
4	Stefen Seng	Singapore	X	X	16.03	X	16.02	X	16.03	
5	Nguyen Van Hung	Vietnam	15.86	15.61	X	X	15.55	15.95	15.95	
6	Nguyen Manh Hieu	Vietnam	15.04	15.23	14.50	14.71	X	14.67	15.23	
7	Sipaseuth	Laos	14.41	14.53	14.49	-	-	-	14.53	
8	Souphy	Laos	X	13.55	13.26	-	-	-	13.55	

==== Shot put ====
- December 13 - FINAL

Rank	Athlete	Nationality	1	2	3	4	5	6	Result	Notes
1st place, gold medalist(s)	Chatchawal Polyiam	Thailand	17.16	17.59	X	X	X	X	17.59	GR
2nd place, silver medalist(s)	Adi Aliffudin	Malaysia	16.34	16.54	X	X	16.09	16.92	16.92	
3rd place, bronze medalist(s)	Sathaporn Kajorn	Thailand	15.75	15.39	X	X	15.59	15.60	15.75	
4	Eliezer Sunang	Philippines	X	X	14.79	X	15.16	15.56	15.56	
5	Yazid Yatami Yusof	Brunei	12.79	12.78	12.87	13.22	12.89	13.25	13.25	
6	Souvanha	Laos	12.16	11.85	11.84	11.81	X	X	12.16	
7	Kamphai	Laos	11.57	11.89	X	X	X	X	11.89	

==== Discus throw ====
- December 16 - FINAL

Rank	Athlete	Nationality	1	2	3	4	5	6	Result	Notes
1st place, gold medalist(s)	WongTuck Yim	Singapore	52.18	X	X	52.53	X	53.60	53.60	
2nd place, silver medalist(s)	Kvanchai Numsomboon	Thailand	46.65	51.05	52.15	51.23	X	50.50	52.15	
3rd place, bronze medalist(s)	Wansawang Sawasdee	Thailand	49.00	49.69	51.53	52.02	50.90	X	52.02	
4	Scott Wong	Singapore	43.22	44.95	44.66	X	42.58	X	44.95	
5	Tranh Minh Tuan	Vietnam	43.64	X	43.01	42.30	X	41.41	43.64	
6	Yazid Yatami Yusof	Brunei	43.29	42.29	X	X	X	X	43.29	
7	Souvanha Phouthonesy	Laos	35.83	X	X	35.31	36.41	35.83	36.41	

==== Hammer throw ====
- December 13 - FINAL

Rank	Athlete	Nationality	1	2	3	4	5	6	Result	Notes
1st place, gold medalist(s)	Arniel Ferrera	Philippines	X	60.40	X	60.18	61.62	X	61.62	GR
2nd place, silver medalist(s)	Tantipong Phetchaiya	Thailand	56.74	58.09	X	58.98	57.09	59.56	59.56	
3rd place, bronze medalist(s)	Yongjaros Kanju	Thailand	54.05	53.40	54.52	56.52	56.60	X	56.60	
4	Ardiansyah Apandi	Indonesia	43.20	X	44.13	41.27	41.54	X	44.13	

==== Javelin throw ====
- December 17 - FINAL

Rank	Athlete	Nationality	1	2	3	4	5	6	Result	Notes
1st place, gold medalist(s)	Danilo Fresnido	Philippines	65.64	67.45	72.93	65.88	66.28	-	72.93	
2nd place, silver medalist(s)	Nontach Palanupat	Thailand	66.55	65.21	64.19	66.41	67.68	66.37	67.68	
3rd place, bronze medalist(s)	Sanya Buathong	Thailand	66.26	67.00	62.60	-	X	67.43	67.43	
4	Yulius Morin	Indonesia	64.06	58.59	X	50.44	60.31	67.15	67.15	
5	Khongma Korakant	Laos	58.02	58.60	61.07	59.24	60.97	58.89	61.07	
6	Phongsamouth Khanthaphone	Laos	46.83	45.66	52.58	X	X	48.82	52.58	

=== Combined Event ===
==== Decathlon ====
- December 13 - 100m

Rank	Lane	Runner	NOC	Time	Scores	Note
1	7	Vu Van Huyen	(Vietnam)	10.78	910	
2	5	Boonkete Chalon	(Thailand)	11.08	843	
3	6	Oudomsack Chanthavong	(Laos)	11.25	806	
4	4	Nguyen Van Hue	(Vietnam)	11.32	791	
5	2	Amnat Kunpadit	(Thailand)	11.33	789	
6	3	Boupheth Vonkhamsone	(Laos)	12.09	633	

- December 13 - Long Jump

Rank	Athlete	Nationality	1	2	3	Result	Scores	Notes
1	Nguyen Van Hue	(Vietnam)	6.62	7.09	-	7.09	835	
2	Vu Van Huyen	(Vietnam)	6.86	6.88	7.02	7.02	818	
3	Oudomsack Chanthavong	(Laos)	6.51	6.73	6.67	6.73	750	
4	Boonkete Chalon	(Thailand)	6.55	6.71	X	6.71	746	
5	Amnat Kunpadit	(Thailand)	6.50	X	6.48	6.50	697	
6	Boupheth Vonkhamsone	(Laos)	5.95	5.58	5.67	5.95	576	

- December 13 - Shot Put

Rank	Athlete	Nationality	1	2	3	Result	Scores	Notes
1	Boonkete Chalon	(Thailand)	12.42	12.60	12.62	12.62	644	
2	Vu Van Huyen	(Vietnam)	10.78	11.72	11.83	11.83	596	
3	Boupheth Vonkhamsone	(Laos)	X	10.48	X	10.48	515	
4	Nguyen Van Hue	(Vietnam)	10.22	9.89	9.88	10.22	499	
5	Oudomsack Chanthavong	(Laos)	9.91	9.95	10.16	10.16	495	
6	Amnat Kunpadit	(Thailand)	8.95	9.71	9.63	9.71	468	

- December 13 -High Jump

Rank	Athlete	NOC	Time	Scores	Note
1	Vu Van Huyen	(Vietnam)	2.01m	813	
2	Oudomsack Chanthavong	(Laos)	1.89m	705	
3	Nguyen Van Hue	(Vietnam)	1.86m	679	
4	Boonkete Chalon	(Thailand)	1.80m	627	
5	Boupheth Vonkhamsone	(Laos)	1.77m	602	
6	Amnat Kunpadit	(Thailand)	1.71m	552	

- December 13 - 400m

Rank	Lane	Runner	NOC	Time	Scores	Note
1	3	Vu Van Huyen	(Vietnam)	49.10	857	
2	4	Boonkete Chalon	(Thailand)	49.44	841	
3	5	Oudomsack Chanthavong	(Laos)	51.86	731	
4	6	Nguyen Van Hue	(Vietnam)	52.36	709	
5	2	Boupheth Vonkhamsone	(Laos)	54.55	617	
6	7	Amnat Kunpadit	(Thailand)	56.05	557	

- December 14 - 110m Hurdle

Rank	Lane	Runner	NOC	Time	Scores	Note
1	3	Vu Van Huyen	(Vietnam)	15.15	831	
2	1	Amnat Kunpadit	(Thailand)	15.38	804	
3	6	Oudomsack Chanthavong	(Laos)	15.41	801	
4	5	Nguyen Van Hue	(Vietnam)	15.72	765	
5	4	Boonkete Chalon	(Thailand)	15.74	762	
6	2	Boupheth Vonkhamsone	(Laos)	17.49	574	

- December 14 - Discus Throw

Rank	Athlete	Nationality	1	2	3	Result	Scores	Notes
1	Vu Van Huyen	(Vietnam)	35.84	38.85	39.42	39.42	653	
2	Boonkete Chalon	(Thailand)	33.20	35.37	X	35.37	571	
3	Boupheth Vonkhamsone	(Laos)	31.58	X	X	31.58	496	
4	Amnat Kunpadit	(Thailand)	27.60	27.55	X	27.60	417	
5	Oudomsack Chanthavong	(Laos)	24.36	26.18	X	26.18	390	
6	Nguyen Van Hue	(Vietnam)	X	X	24.08	24.08	349	

- December 14 -Pole Vault

Rank	Athlete	NOC	Time	Scores	Note
1	Amnat Kunpadit	(Thailand)	4.80m	849	
2	Vu Van Huyen	(Vietnam)	4.40m	731	
3	Nguyen Van Hue	(Vietnam)	4.40m	731	
4	Boonkete Chalon	(Thailand)	4.10m	645	
5	Boupheth Vonkhamsone	(Laos)	3.70m	535	
6	Oudomsack Chanthavong	(Laos)	3.70m	535	

- December 14 - Javelin Throw

Rank	Athlete	Nationality	1	2	3	Result	Scores	Notes
1	Vu Van Huyen	(Vietnam)	51.41	55.72	54.14	55.72	674	
2	Boonkete Chalon	(Thailand)	50.85	53.04	52.90	53.04	634	
3	Nguyen Van Hue	(Vietnam)	45.29	-	-	45.29	519	
4	Oudomsack Chanthavong	(Laos)	43.69	45.28	34.69	45.28	519	
5	Boupheth Vonkhamsone	(Laos)	X	44.47	X	44.47	507	
6	Amnat Kunpadit	(Thailand)	37.24	X	40.62	40.62	451	

- December 14 - 1500m

Rank	Lane	Runner	NOC	Time	Scores	Note
1	6	Vu Van Huyen	(Vietnam)	4:40.77	675	
2	2	Boonkete Chalon	(Thailand)	4:52.63	603	
3	3	Boupheth Vonkhamsone	(Laos)	4:55.57	586	
4	4	Nguyen Van Hue	(Vietnam)	4:56.70	579	
5	5	Oudomsack Chanthavong	(Laos)	4:58.84	566	
6	1	Amnat Kunpadit	(Thailand)	6:08.85	229	

- Standings after Event 10
  14 December 2009

Rank	Athlete	NOC	December 13					December 14					Total Score	Notes
Rank	Athlete	NOC	100 Meters	Long Jump	Shot Put	High Jump	400 Meters	110m Hurdles	Discus	Pole Vault	Javelin	1500 Meter	Total Score	Notes
1st place, gold medalist(s)	Vu Van Huyen	(Vietnam)	10.78; 910	7.02; 818	11.83; 596	2.01m 813	49.10; 857	15.15; 831	39.42; 653	4.40m 731	55.72; 674	4:40.77; 675	7558	GR
2nd place, silver medalist(s)	Boonkete Chalon	(Thailand)	11.08; 843	6.71; 746	12.62; 644	1.80m 627	49.44; 841	15.74; 762	35.37; 571	4.10m 645	53.04; 634	4:52.63; 603	6916	
3rd place, bronze medalist(s)	Nguyen Van Hue	(Vietnam)	11.32; 791	7.09; 835	10.22; 499	1.86m 679	52.36; 709	15.72; 765	24.08; 349	4.40m 731	45.29; 519	4:56.70; 579	6456	
4	Oudomsack Chanthavong	(Laos)	11.25	6.73; 750	10.16; 495	1.89m 705	51.86; 731	15.41; 801	26.18; 390	3.70m 535	45.28; 519	4:58.84; 566	6298	
5	Amnat Kunpadit	(Thailand)	11.33; 789	6.50; 697	9.71; 468	1.71m 552	56.05; 557	15.38; 804	27.60; 417	4.80m 849	40.62; 451	6:08.85; 229	5813	
6	Boupheth Vonkhamsone	(Laos)	12.09; 633	5.95; 576	10.48; 515	1.77m 602	54.55; 617	17.49; 574	31.58; 496	3.70m 535	44.47; 507	4:55.57; 586	5641	

== Women ==
=== Track Events ===
==== 100 metres ====
- December 13 - Round One Heats
- December 13 - FINAL
- Heat 1

Rank	Lane	Runner	NOC	Time	Note
1	6	Le Ngoc Phuong	(Vietnam)	11.85	
2	7	Nurul Sarah Kadir	(Malaysia)	11.85	
3	3	Irene T. Joseph	(Indonesia)	11.91	
4	5	Neeranuch Klomdee	(Thailand)	12.54	
5	4	Phordy Sitthideth	(Laos)	13.09	

- Heat 2

Rank	Lane	Runner	NOC	Time	Note
1	6	Vu Thi Huong	(Vietnam)	11.59	
2	5	Laphassaporn Tawoncharoen	(Thailand)	11.78	
3	3	Norjannah Hafiszah	(Malaysia)	11.93	
4	2	Tri Setyo Utami	(Indonesia)	12.06	
5	7	Vansy Thammalath	(Laos)	15.66	
6	4	Sou Titlida	(Cambodia)	11.18	

- FINAL

Rank	Lane	Runner	NOC	Time	Note
1st place, gold medalist(s)	6	Vu Thi Huong	(Vietnam)	11.34	
2nd place, silver medalist(s)	6	Le Ngoc Phuong	(Vietnam)	11.746	
2nd place, silver medalist(s)	5	Laphassaporn Tawoncharoen	(Thailand)	11.746	
4	3	Norjannah Hafiszah	(Malaysia)	11.82	
5	7	Nurul Sarah Kadir	(Malaysia)	11.83	
6	3	Irene T. Joseph	(Indonesia)	11.91	
7	2	Tri Setyo Utami	(Indonesia)	12.03	
8	5	Neeranuch Klomdee	(Thailand)	DNS	

==== 200 metres ====
- December 16 - FINAL
- FINAL

Rank	Lane	Runner	NOC	Time	Note
1st place, gold medalist(s)	2	Vu Thi Huong	(Vietnam)	23.31	
2nd place, silver medalist(s)	7	Kay Khine Lwin	(Myanmar)	24.00	
3rd place, bronze medalist(s)	5	Le Nguoc Phuong	(Vietnam)	24.03	
4	6	Nurul Sarah Kadir	(Malaysia)	24.10	
5	4	Laphassaporn Tawoncharoen	(Thailand)	24.15	
6	3	Norjannah Hafiszah	(Malaysia)	24.48	

==== 400 metres ====
- December 16 - Round One Heats
- December 17 - FINAL
- Heat 1

Rank	Lane	Runner	NOC	Time	Note
1	5	Noraseela Khalid	(Malaysia)	56.64	Q
2	4	Saowalee Kaewchuay	(Thailand)	56.84	Q
3	3	Nguyen Thi Bac	(Vietnam)	56.89	Q
4	6	Boudsady Vongdala	(Laos)	1:04.96	

- Heat 2

Rank	Lane	Runner	NOC	Time	Note
1	5	Treewadee Yongphan	(Thailand)	56.75	Q
2	4	Kay Khine Lwin	(Myanmar)	57.12	Q
3	3	Ganthi Manthi Kumarasamy	(Malaysia)	57.42	Q
4	6	Nguyen Thi Thuy	(Vietnam)	58.16	Q
5	2	Sayloung Inthavong	(Laos)	1:02.36	Q

- FINAL

Rank	Lane	Runner	NOC	Time	Note
1st place, gold medalist(s)	4	Treewadee Yongphan	(Thailand)	54.16	
2nd place, silver medalist(s)	6	Kay Khine Lwin	(Myanmar)	54.25	
3rd place, bronze medalist(s)	5	Noraseela Khalid	(Malaysia)	54.32	
4	3	Saowalee Kaewchuay	(Thailand)	54.96	
5	8	Nguyen Thi Bac	(Vietnam)	56.12	
6	2	Nguyen Thi Thuy	(Vietnam)	57.61	
7	7	Ganthi Manthi Kumarasamy	(Malaysia)	57.69	
8	1	Sayloung Inthavong	(Laos)	1:01.92	

==== 800 metres ====
- December 14 - FINAL
- FINAL

Rank	Lane	Runner	NOC	Time	Note
1st place, gold medalist(s)	3	Truong Thanh Hang	(Vietnam)	2:02.74	
2nd place, silver medalist(s)	4	Ganthi Manthi Kumarasamy	(Malaysia)	2:07.99	
3rd place, bronze medalist(s)	6	Do Thi Thao	(Vietnam)	2:12.26	
4	1	Than Toe Khin Myo	(Myanmar)	2:13.46	
5	2	Koodkeo Muenkod	(Laos)	2:30.40	
6	5	Toly Pheagphalang	(Laos)	2:32.30	

==== 1500 metres ====
- December 17 - FINAL
- FINAL

Rank	Lane	Runner	NOC	Time	Note
1st place, gold medalist(s)	1	Truong Thanh Hang	(Vietnam)	4:19.48	
2nd place, silver medalist(s)	7	Naing Naing Win	(Myanmar)	4:20.47	
3rd place, bronze medalist(s)	4	Bhu Thi Hien	(Vietnam)	4:38.81	
4	3	Than Toe Khin Myo	(Myanmar)	4:52.49	
5	5	Wantana Sawang	(Thailand)	4:57.99	
6	6	Souvany Pheangthijuk	(Laos)	5:09.32	
7	2	Koodkeo Muenkod	(Laos)	5:12.60	

==== 5000 metres ====
- December 14 - FINAL
- FINAL

Rank	Lane	Runner	NOC	Time	Notes
1st place, gold medalist(s)	1	Triyaningsih	(Indonesia)	15:56.79	
2nd place, silver medalist(s)	10	Naing Naing Win	(Myanmar)	16:38.02	
3rd place, bronze medalist(s)	3	Mercedita Manipol Fetalvero	(Philippines)	17:12.09	
4	4	Saifon Boonjang	(Thailand)	18:06.35	
5	9	Unik Setyorini	(Indonesia)	18:15.00	
6	6	Bui Thi Hien	(Vietnam)	18:15.16	
7	7	Woraphan Nuansari	(Thailand)	18:32.02	
8	5	Marquitados Santos	(Timor-Leste)	19:53.60	
9	8	Souvanni Pheangthijuk	(Laos)	20:34.34	
10	2	Souksavanh Malivanh	(Laos)	20:45.92	

==== 10,000 metres ====
- December 17 - FINAL
- FINAL

Rank	Lane	Runner	NOC	Time	Notes
1st place, gold medalist(s)	3	Triyaningsih	(Indonesia)	32:49.47	GR
2nd place, silver medalist(s)	1	Mercedita Manipol Fetalvero	(Philippines)	36:15.66	
3rd place, bronze medalist(s)	4	Pham Thi Hien	(Vietnam)	36:57.86	
4	2	Saifon Boonjang	(Thailand)	37:10.44	
5	5	Souksavanh Malivanh	(Laos)	41:58.46	
6	6	Unik Setyorini	(Indonesia)	-	DNS

==== 100 metre hurdles ====
- December 16 - FINAL
- FINAL

Rank	Lane	Runner	NOC	Time	Note
1st place, gold medalist(s)	5	Dedeh Erawati	(Indonesia)	13.34	
2nd place, silver medalist(s)	4	Wallapa Punsoongneun	(Thailand)	13.84	
3rd place, bronze medalist(s)	2	Agustina Bawele	(Indonesia)	14.21	
4	3	Sheena Atilano	(Philippines)	14.37	

==== 400 metre hurdles ====
- December 13 - FINAL
- FINAL

Rank	Lane	Runner	NOC	Time	Note
1st place, gold medalist(s)	3	Noraseela Khalid	(Malaysia)	00:56.99	
2nd place, silver medalist(s)	6	Amornrat Winatho	(Thailand)	00:58.00	
3rd place, bronze medalist(s)	7	Nguyen Thi Bac	(Vietnam)	01:00.31	
4	2	Jutamas Khonkham	(Thailand)	01:04.75	
5	4	Nguyễn Thị Nga	(Vietnam)	01:05.93	
6	5	Saimay	(Laos)	01:10.99	

==== 4×100 metre relay ====
- December 14 - FINAL

Rank	Lane	Nation	Competitors	Time	Notes
1st place, gold medalist(s)	3	(Thailand)	Jintara Seangdee, Phatsorn Jaksuninkorn, Laphassaporn Tawoncharoen, Nongnuch Sanrat	44.54	
2nd place, silver medalist(s)	6	(Vietnam)	,	44.82	
3rd place, bronze medalist(s)	7	(Indonesia)	,	45.32	
4	5	(Malaysia)	Norjnnah Hafiszah Jamaluddin, Yee Yi Ling, Cynthia Manging, Nurul Sarah Abdul Kadir	45.69	
5	4	(Laos)	,	51.32	

==== 4×400 metre relay ====
- December 14 - FINAL

Rank	Lane	Nation	Competitors	Time	Notes
1st place, gold medalist(s)	3	(Thailand)	Saowalee Kaewchuay, Treewadee Yongphan, Karat Srimuang, Amornrat Winatho	3:38.51	
2nd place, silver medalist(s)	2	(Myanmar)	Lai Lai Win, Aye Aye Than, Yin Yin Khine, Kay Khine Lwin	3:43.29	
3rd place, bronze medalist(s)	4	(Vietnam)	Nguyễn Thị Nga, Nguyen Thi Thuy, Vu Thuy Trang, Nguyen Thi Bac	3:49.28	
4	5	(Malaysia)	Nurul Faizah Asma, Norrohida Baidawi, Kumarasamy Ganthimanthi, Cynthia Manging	3:49.89	
5	6	(Laos)	,	4:13.05	

==== Marathon ====
- December 15 - FINAL
- FINAL

Rank	Lane	Runner	NOC	Time	Notes
1st place, gold medalist(s)	4	Jho-An Banayag	(Philippines)	02:46:34	
2nd place, silver medalist(s)	6	Sunisa Sailomyen	(Thailand)	02:46:47	
3rd place, bronze medalist(s)	1	Ni Lar San	(Myanmar)	02:46:54	
4	7	Pham Thi Hien	(Vietnam)	02:49:52	
5	8	Unik Setyorini	(Indonesia)	02:54:23	
6	3	Christabel Martes	(Philippines)	03:00:31	
7	9	Thidra Cho	(Myanmar)	03:08:01	
8	6	Pacharee ChaitongsriI	(Thailand)	03:12:02	

=== Race Walk ===
==== 20 km walk ====
- December 15 - FINAL
- FINAL

Rank	Lane	Runner	NOC	Time	Notes
1st place, gold medalist(s)	4	Kay Khing Myo Tun	(Myanmar)	01:45:06	
2nd place, silver medalist(s)	1	Darwati	(Indonesia)	01:45:23	
3rd place, bronze medalist(s)	5	Sar Mar Lar Nwe	(Myanmar)	01:46:56	
4	3	Norliana	(Malaysia)	01:54:58	
5	6	Tanaphon Assawawongcharoen	(Thailand)	01:46:08	
6	2	Manilat Phamesethong	(Laos)	02:00:40	

=== Field Event ===
==== High jump ====
- December 14 - FINAL

Rank	Jumper	Result	Notes
1st place, gold medalist(s)	Noengruthai Chaipech (THA)	1.94m	GR, NR
2nd place, silver medalist(s)	Wanida Boonwan (THA)	1.88m	
3rd place, bronze medalist(s)	Duong Thi Viet Anh (VIE)	1.88m	
4	Bui Thi Nhung (VIE)	1.80m	

==== Pole vault ====
- December 17 - FINAL
- FINAL

Rank	Athlete	NOC	Result	Notes
1st place, gold medalist(s)	Roslinda Samsu	(Malaysia)	4.15m	GR
2nd place, silver medalist(s)	Le Thi Phuong	(Vietnam)	3.90m	
3rd place, bronze medalist(s)	Sukanya Chomchuendee	(Thailand)	3.75m	
4	Ni Putu Desy Margawati	(Indonesia)	3.75m	
5	Kathleen Ong	(Malaysia)	3.60m	
6	Sunisa Kao-Iad	(Thailand)	3.40m	
7	Toukta Khambounheuang	(Laos)	-	
8	Rachel Isabel Yang	(Singapore)	-	DNS

==== Long jump ====
- December 16 - FINAL

Rank	Athlete	Nationality	1	2	3	4	5	6	Result	Notes
1st place, gold medalist(s)	Marestella Torres	Philippines	6.48	X	6.43	6.68	X	6.53	6.68	GR
2nd place, silver medalist(s)	Thitima Muangjan	Thailand	6.17	6.31	6.32	6.35	6.31	X	6.35	
3rd place, bronze medalist(s)	Maria Natalia Londa	Indonesia	X	6.05	6.12	X	6.08	6.23	6.23	
4	Sirada Seechaichana	Thailand	5.95	6.15	6.12	6.19	X	6.21	6.21	
5	Siti Zubaidah	Malaysia	X	5.81	5.83	5.62	5.50	5.75	5.83	
6	Nguyen Mai Quynh	Singapore	X	5.62	X	5.45	5.55	-	5.62	

==== Triple jump ====
- December 14 - FINAL

Rank	Name	Nationality	1	2	3	4	5	6	Result	Notes
1st place, gold medalist(s)	Thitima Muangjan	Thailand	14.08	x	13.67	13.76	-	-	14.08	GR
2nd place, silver medalist(s)	Sirada Seechaichana	Thailand	12.77	13.40	13.48	13.06	x	-	13.48	
3rd place, bronze medalist(s)	Maria Natalia Londa	Indonesia	13.08	13.31	-	x	13.09	-	13.31	
4	Nguyen Mai Quynh	Vietnam	x	x	13.00	13.22	13.01	x	13.22	
5	Noor Amira Nafiah	Malaysia	x	x	x	11.45	12.12	11.48	12.12	

==== Shot put ====
- December 17 - FINAL

Rank	Athlete	Nationality	1	2	3	4	5	6	Result	Notes
1st place, gold medalist(s)	Zhang Guirong	(Singapore)	17.11	X	17.12	16.85	X	X	17.12	
2nd place, silver medalist(s)	Juthaporn Krasaeyan	(Thailand)	15.10	15.77	15.57	15.42	X	15.67	15.77	
3rd place, bronze medalist(s)	Siwaporn Warapiang	(Thailand)	13.12	12.68	13.58	14.04	X	14.08	14.08	
4	Soudphasone Phan Vatvongsouk	(Laos)	10.47	10.73	10.08	10.81	X	10.44	10.81	

==== Discus throw ====
- December 14 - FINAL

Rank	Athlete	Nationality	1st	2nd	3rd	4th	5th	6th	Result	Notes
1st place, gold medalist(s)	Dwi Ratnawati	Indonesia	42.84	x	x	50.63	x	x	50.63	
2nd place, silver medalist(s)	Siwaporn Warapiang	Thailand	49.85	48.37	x	x	x	x	49.85	
3rd place, bronze medalist(s)	Juthaporn Krasaeyan	Thailand	48.22	49.12	49.11	47.77	x	48.85	49.12	
4	Wan Lay Chi	Singapore	44.80	43.29	45.84	x	46.09	45.91	46.09	

==== Hammer throw ====
- December 15 - FINAL

Rank	Athlete	Nationality	1	2	3	4	5	6	Result	Notes
1st place, gold medalist(s)	Tan Song Hwa	Malaysia	40.74	55.01	55.67	X	56.41	X	56.41	GR
2nd place, silver medalist(s)	Rose Herlinda	Indonesia	54.12	X	X	X	X	X	54.12	GR
3rd place, bronze medalist(s)	Ruttana Suraprasert	Thailand	47.05	X	45.08	X	X	48.00	48.00	
4	Rujira Kowangchai	Thailand	43.85	44.50	45.15	44.33	46.61	44.36	46.61	
5	Anita Rohma	Indonesia	45.58	45.70	X	44.25	44.76	46.04	46.04	
6	Souphalay Sinthalavong	Laos	X	26.68	X	X	26.37	23.21	26.68	

==== Javelin throw ====
- December 13 - FINAL

Rank	Athlete	Nationality	1	2	3	4	5	6	Result	Notes
1st place, gold medalist(s)	Rosie Villarito	Philippines	X	48.36	X	49.69	48.72	48.18	49.69	GR
2nd place, silver medalist(s)	Lo Thi Hang	Vietnam	42.43	44.02	X	45.95	X	44.74	45.95	
3rd place, bronze medalist(s)	Tran Thi Tham	Vietnam	44.94	43.17	42.89	X	45.01	44.60	45.01	
4	Natta Nachan	Thailand	43.53	45.00	42.76	41.95	X	43.97	45.00	
5	Phouvieng	Laos	41.88	43.98	41.36	X	X	-	43.98	
6	Teo Hui Juen	Singapore	40.30	40.18	43.29	37.42	40.08	37.30	43.29	
7	Buoban Pamang	Thailand	-	-	-	-	-	-	DNS	

=== Combined Event ===
==== Heptathlon ====
Results

- 100 metres hurdles

16 December 2009

Rank	Athlete	Time	Points	Notes
1	Amornrat Winatho (THA)	13.89	994	
2	Nguyen Thi Thu Cuc (VIE)	15.05	835	
3	Duong Thi Viet Anh (VIE)	15.65	758	
4	Narcisa Atienza (PHI)	16.05	708	
5	Philaylack Sackpaseuth (LAO)	16.15	696	NR

- High jump

16 December 2009

Rank	Athlete	Result	Points	Notes
1	Duong Thi Viet Anh (VIE)	1.85	1041	
2	Narcisa Atienza (PHI)	1.76	928	
3	Amornrat Winatho (THA)	1.73	891	
3	Nguyen Thi Thu Cuc (VIE)	1.73	891	
5	Philaylack Sackpaseuth (LAO)	1.40	512	

- Shot put

16 December 2009

Rank	Athlete	Result	Points	Notes
1	Narcisa Atienza (PHI)	11.91	655	
2	Amornrat Winatho (THA)	11.66	639	
3	Nguyen Thi Thu Cuc (VIE)	11.00	595	
4	Duong Thi Viet Anh (VIE)	9.20	477	
5	Philaylack Sackpaseuth (LAO)	9.03	466	

- 200 metres

16 December 2009

Rank	Athlete	Time	Points	Notes
1	Amornrat Winatho (THA)	24.86	900	
2	Narcisa Atienza (PHI)	26.56	749	
3	Nguyen Thi Thu Cuc (VIE)	26.86	724	
4	Duong Thi Viet Anh (VIE)	27.62	661	
5	Philaylack Sackpaseuth (LAO)	27.48	672	

- Long jump

17 December 2009

Rank	Athlete	Result	Points	Notes
1	Amornrat Winatho (THA)	5.84	801	
2	Duong Thi Viet Anh (VIE)	5.78	783	
3	Nguyen Thi Thu Cuc (VIE)	5.66	747	
4	Narcisa Atienza (PHI)	5.41	674	
5	Philaylack Sackpaseuth (LAO)	5.11	589	

- Javelin throw

17 December 2009

Rank	Athlete	Result	Points	Notes
1	Narcisa Atienza (PHI)	45.52	774	
2	Amornrat Winatho (THA)	38.63	641	
3	Nguyen Thi Thu Cuc (VIE)	35.43	580	
4	Duong Thi Viet Anh (VIE)	29.01	458	
5	Philaylack Sackpaseuth (LAO)	23.71	358	

- 800 metres

17 December 2009

Rank	Athlete	Time	Points	Notes
1	Amornrat Winatho (THA)	2:23.40	778	
2	Nguyen Thi Thu Cuc (VIE)	2:24.09	769	
3	Narcisa Atienza (PHI)	2:29.13	704	
4	Duong Thi Viet Anh (VIE)	2:48.53	479	
5	Philaylack Sackpaseuth (LAO)	3:15.10	238	

- Standings after Event 7
  17 December 2009

Rank	Athlete	NOC	December 16				December 17			Total Score	Notes
Rank	Athlete	NOC	100m Hurdles	High Jump	Shot Put	200 Meters	Long Jump	Javelin	800 Meter	Total Score	Notes
1st place, gold medalist(s)	Amornrat Winatho	Thailand (THA)	994	891	639	900	801	641	778	5644	
2nd place, silver medalist(s)	Narcisa Matalog Atienza	Philippines (PHI)	708	928	655	724	674	774	704	5167	
3rd place, bronze medalist(s)	Nguyen Thi Thu Cuc	Vietnam (VIE)	835	891	595	749	747	580	769	5166	
4	Duong Thi Viet Anh	Vietnam (VIE)	758	1041	477	661	783	458	479	4657	
5	Philaylack Sackpaseuth	Laos (LAO)	696	512	466	672	589	358	238	3531	NR
