= Athletics at the 2009 SEA Games =

- Venue: Laos National Stadium
- Location: Vientiane, Laos
- Date: 13–17 December 2009
- Nations: 11

Athletics at the 2009 SEA Games, was held at the in Vientiane, Laos from 13 December to 17 December. A total of 45 events were contested.

== Medal summary ==
* Host nation (Laos)

| Rank | Nation | Gold | Silver | Bronze | Total |
|---|---|---|---|---|---|
| 1 | Thailand (THA) | 14 | 20 | 14 | 48 |
| 2 | Indonesia (INA) | 7 | 7 | 7 | 21 |
| 3 | Vietnam (VIE) | 7 | 4 | 11 | 22 |
| 4 | Philippines (PHI) | 7 | 3 | 4 | 14 |
| 5 | Malaysia (MAS) | 6 | 6 | 4 | 16 |
| 6 | Myanmar (MYA) | 2 | 5 | 2 | 9 |
| 7 | Singapore (SIN) | 2 | 1 | 0 | 3 |
| 8 | Cambodia (CAM) | 0 | 0 | 1 | 1 |
| 8 | Laos (LAO)* | 0 | 0 | 1 | 1 |
| Totals (9 entries) | | 45 | 46 | 44 | 135 |

== Results ==
The full results can be found here.

=== Men ===
| Event | Gold | | Silver | | Bronze | |
|---|---|---|---|---|---|---|
| 100 m (Wind: +0.8 m/s) | Suryo Agung Wibowo; Indonesia | 10.17 GR | Wachara Sondee; Thailand | 10.30 | Muhammad Fadlin; Indonesia | 10.61 |
| 200 m | Suryo Agung Wibowo; Indonesia | 20.85 | Sittichai Suwonprateep; Thailand | 21.12 | Suppachai Chimdee; Thailand | 21.24 |
| 400 m | Zafril Zuslaini; Malaysia | 47.11 | Heru Astriyanto; Indonesia | 47.35 | Jukkatip Pojaroen; Thailand | 47.53 |
| 800 m | Nguyễn Đình Cương; Vietnam | 1:50.65 | Mohd Jironi Riduan; Malaysia | 1:50.98 | Subramaniam Mathialagan; Malaysia | 1:51.75 |
| 1500 m | Nguyễn Đình Cương; Vietnam | 3:46.58 | Mohd Jironi Riduan; Malaysia | 3:47.34 | Mahendran Vadivellan; Malaysia | 3:48.99 |
| 5000 m | Aung Khaing; Myanmar | 14:43.12 | Boonthung Srisung; Thailand | 14:50.71 | Julius Sermona; Philippines | 14:59.85 |
| 10000 m | Agus Prayogo; Indonesia | 29:51.40 | Jauhari Johan; Indonesia | 30:10.52 | Boonthung Srisung; Thailand | 30:25.75 |
| 110 m hurdles | Jamras Rittidet; Thailand | 13.89 GR | Mohd Robani Hassan; Malaysia | 14.05 | Suphan Wongsriphuck; Thailand | 14.16 |
| 400 m hurdles | Narongdech Janjai; Thailand | 52.49 | Zulkarnain Purba; Indonesia | 53.40 | Phatyot Klong-Ngan; Thailand | 54.15 |
| 3000 m steeplechase | Rene Herrera; Philippines | 09:11.20 | Patikarn Pechsricha; Thailand | 09:27.21 | Nguyễn Văn Lý; Vietnam | 09:38.80 |
| 4 × 100 m relay | Thailand; Suppachai Chimdee; Wachara Sondee; Sompote Suwannarangsri; Sittichai Suwonprateep | 39.34 | Singapore; Gary Yeo; Elfi Mustapa; Lee Chong Wei; Amirudin Jamal | 39.82 | Indonesia; Riski Latip; Apip Dwi Cahyono; Muhammad Fadlin; Suryo Agung Wibowo | 40.16 |
| 4 × 400 m relay | Thailand; Jukkatip Pojaroen; Chanatip Ruckburee; Supachai Phachsay; Suppachai Chimdee | 3:08.40 | Malaysia; Zafril Zuslaini; Idris Zakaria; Paneerselvam Yuvaaraj; Zaiful Zainal Abidin | 3:10.19 | Laos; Kethsada Phengsavanh; Saly Kheuabmavong; Kenmanh Chanthavong; Phouthaviphone Phonxaiya | 3:26.46 |
| Marathon | Eduardo Buenavista; Philippines | 2:21:10.14 | Yahuza; Indonesia | 2:21:56.12 | Hem Bunting; Cambodia | 2:25:19.68 |
| 20 km walk | Teoh Boon Lim; Malaysia | 1:31:28 | Indra Abdul Kadir; Indonesia | 1:32:09 | Kristian Lumban Tobing; Indonesia | 1:33:35 |
| High jump | Lee Hup Wei; Malaysia | 2.18 m | Pramote Pumurai; Thailand | 2.14 m | Suchart Singhaklang; Thailand | 2.10 m |
| Pole vault | Kreeta Sintawacheewa; Thailand | 5.21 m GR | Sompong Saombankuay; Thailand | 5.00 m | Mohd Hafizuddin Shahadan; Malaysia | 4.50 m |
| Long jump | Supanara Sukhasvasti; Thailand | 7.83 m | Joebert Delicano; Philippines | 7.74 m | Henry Dagmil; Philippines | 7.72 m |
| Triple jump | Theerayut Philakong; Thailand | 16.51 m GR | Varunyoo Kongnil; Thailand | 16.29 m | Joebert Delicano; Philippines | 16.12 m |
| Shot put | Chatchawal Polyiam; Thailand | 17.59 m GR | Adi Aliffudin; Malaysia | 16.92 m | Sathaporn Kajorn; Thailand | 15.75 m |
| Discus throw | James Wong Tuck Yim; Singapore | 53.60 m | Kvanchai Numsomboon; Thailand | 52.15 m | Wansawang Sawasdee; Thailand | 52.02 m |
| Hammer throw | Arniel Ferrera; Philippines | 61.62 m GR | Tantipong Phetchaiya; Thailand | 59.56 m | Yongjaros Kanju; Thailand | 56.60 m |
| Javelin throw | Danilo Fresnido; Philippines | 72.93 m | Nontach Palanupat; Thailand | 67.68 m | Sanya Buathong; Thailand | 67.43 m |
| Decathlon | Vũ Văn Huyện; Vietnam | 7558 pts GR | Boonkete Chalon; Thailand | 6916 pts | Nguyễn Văn Huê; Vietnam | 6456 pts |

=== Women ===
| Event | Gold | | Silver | | Bronze | |
|---|---|---|---|---|---|---|
| 100 m (Wind: +0.0 m/s) | Vũ Thị Hương; Vietnam | 11.34 | Laphassaporn Tawoncharoen; Thailand | 11.75 (11.746) | none awarded | - |
| 100 m (Wind: +0.0 m/s) | Vũ Thị Hương; Vietnam | 11.34 | Lê Ngọc Phượng; Vietnam | 11.75 (11.746) | none awarded | - |
| 200 m | Vũ Thị Hương; Vietnam | 23.31 | Kay Khine Lwin; Myanmar | 24.00 | Lê Ngọc Phượng; Vietnam | 24.03 |
| 400 m | Treewadee Yongphan; Thailand | 54.16 | Kay Khine Lwin; Myanmar | 54.25 | Noraseela Khalid; Malaysia | 54.32 |
| 800 m | Trương Thanh Hằng; Vietnam | 2:02.74 | Kumarasamy Ganthi Manthi; Malaysia | 2:07.99 | Đỗ Thị Thảo; Vietnam | 2:12.26 |
| 1500 m | Trương Thanh Hằng; Vietnam | 4:19.48 | Naing Naing Win; Myanmar | 4:20.47 | Bùi Thị Hiền; Vietnam | 4:38.81 |
| 5000 m | Triyaningsih; Indonesia | 15:56.79 | Naing Naing Win; Myanmar | 16:38.02 | Mercedita Fetalvero; Philippines | 17:12.09 |
| 10000 m | Triyaningsih; Indonesia | 32:49.47 GR | Mercedita Fetalvero; Philippines | 36:15.66 | Phạm Thị Hiên; Vietnam | 36:57.86 |
| 100 m hurdles (Wind: NWI) | Dedeh Erawati; Indonesia | 13.34 | Wallapa Punsoongneun; Thailand | 13.84 | Agustina Bawele; Indonesia | 14.21 |
| 400 m hurdles | Noraseela Khalid; Malaysia | 56.99 | Amornrat Winatho; Thailand | 58.00 | Nguyễn Thị Bắc; Vietnam | 01:00.31 |
| 4 × 100 m relay | Thailand; Jintara Seangdee; Phatsorn Jaksuninkorn; Laphassaporn Tawoncharoen; Nongnuch Sanrat | 44.54 | Vietnam | 44.82 | Indonesia | 45.32 |
| 4 × 400 m relay | Thailand; Saowalee Kaewchuay; Treewadee Yongphan; Karat Srimuang; Amornrat Winatho | 3:38.51 | Myanmar; Lai Lai Win; Aye Aye Than; Yin Yin Khine; Kay Khine Lwin | 3:43.29 | Vietnam; Nguyễn Thị Nga; Nguyễn Thị Thúy; Vũ Thùy Trang; Nguyễn Thị Bắc | 3:49.28 |
| Marathon | Jho-An Banayag; Philippines | 2:46:34 | Sunisa Sailomyen; Thailand | 2:46:47 | Ni Lar San; Myanmar | 2:46:54 |
| 20 km walk | Kay Khing Myo Tun; Myanmar | 1:45:06 | Darwati; Indonesia | 1:45:23 | Saw Mar Lar Nwe; Myanmar | 1:46:56 |
| High jump | Noengrothai Chaipetch; Thailand | 1.94 m GR | Wanida Boonwan; Thailand | 1.88 m | Dương Thị Việt Anh; Vietnam | 1.88 m |
| Pole vault | Roslinda Samsu; Malaysia | 4.15 m GR | Lê Thị Phương; Vietnam | 3.90 m | Sukanya Chomchuendee; Thailand | 3.75 m |
| Long jump | Marestella Torres; Philippines | 6.68 m GR | Thitima Muangjan; Thailand | 6.35 m | Maria Natalia Londa; Indonesia | 6.23 m |
| Triple jump | Thitima Muangjan; Thailand | 14.08 m GR | Sirada Seechaichana; Thailand | 13.48 m | Maria Natalia Londa; Indonesia | 13.31 m |
| Shot put | Zhang Guirong; Singapore | 17.12 m | Juttaporn Krasaeyan; Thailand | 15.77 m | Siwaporn Warapiang; Thailand | 14.08 m |
| Discus throw | Dwi Ratnawati; Indonesia | 50.63 m | Siwaporn Warapiang; Thailand | 49.85 m | Juttaporn Krasaeyan; Thailand | 49.12 m |
| Hammer throw | Tan Song Hwa; Malaysia | 56.41 m GR | Rose Herlinda Inggriana; Indonesia | 54.12 m | Ruttana Suraprasert; Thailand | 48.00 m |
| Javelin throw | Rosie Villarito; Philippines | 49.69 m | Lò Thị Hằng; Vietnam | 45.95 m | Trần Thị Thắm; Vietnam | 45.01 m |
| Heptathlon | Amornrat Winatho; Thailand | 5644 pts | Narcisa Atienza; Philippines | 5167 pts | Nguyễn Thị Thu Cúc; Vietnam | 5166 pts |
