= Athletics at the 2013 SEA Games =

International athletics championship event

- Venue: Wunna Theikdi Stadium
- Location: Naypyidaw, Myanmar
- Date: 15–19 December 2013
- Nations: 11

At the 2013 SEA Games, the athletics events took place in Naypyidaw, Myanmar. The track and field events took place at the Wunna Theikdi Stadium. The competition held between December 15–19.

Thailand retained its traditional position as the nation with the most gold medals with seventeen among its 39 medals. Vietnam was comfortably the next strongest performer with ten golds in its 33-medal haul. Indonesia was third with six gold medals and a total of seventeen. The Philippines also won six golds, and its total of 13 medals was matched by Malaysia and the hosts Myanmar. Eight of the eleven participating countries reached the medal table.

A total of eight games records were bettered at the competition. Thailand provided the bulk of these performances with Jamras Rittidet (men's 110 m hurdles), Tantipong Phetchaiya (men's hammer), Peerachet Jantra (men's javelin), Sukanya Chomchuendee (women's pole vault) and Subenrat Insaeng (women's discus throw) adding themselves to the record books. Myanmar's Saw Mar Lar Nwe significantly improved her best by winning the women's 20 km walk in 1:35:03 hours – breaking the games record and improving the Burmese record by nearly seven minutes. Vietnam's Nguyen Van Hung broke the men's triple jump record with his clearance of 16.67 m (54 ft 8 1/4 in), while Indonesia's Maria Natalia Londa managed the same feat on the women's side with 14.17 m (46 ft 5 3/4 in).

Several athletes won multiple individual titles. Jirapong Meenapra did the men's short sprint double, Mohd Jironi Riduan took gold in both men's middle-distance running events and Nguyen Van Lai broke Vietnamese records to claim a 5000 metres/10,000 metres double. On the women's side, Vu Thi Huong won the sprints and her compatriot Do Thi Thao did a middle-distance double for Vietnam. Phyu War Thet and Triyaningsih had a gold and silver each from the long-distance track events. Maria Natalia Londa won both horizontal jumps and multi-eventer Wassana Winatho won both the heptathlon and the 400 metres hurdles, which brought her career SEA Games medal count to 13.

== Medalists ==
=== Men ===
Event	Gold		Silver		Bronze	
100 metres	Jirapong Meenapra; Thailand	10.48	Iswandi; Indonesia	10.51	Muhammad Amirudin Jamal; Singapore	10.55
200 metres	Jirapong Meenapra; Thailand	21.29	Harith Ammar Mohd Sobri; Malaysia	21.46	Lê Trọng Hinh; Vietnam	21.47
400 metres	Archand Christian Bagsit; Philippines	47.22	Edgardo Alejan Jr; Philippines	47.45	Edy Ariansyah; Indonesia	47.78
800 metres	Mohd Jironi Riduan; Malaysia	1:50.98	Mervin Guarte; Philippines	1:51.51	Dương Văn Thái; Vietnam	1:51.62
1500 metres	Mohd Jironi Riduan; Malaysia	3:58.02	not awarded		Ridwan; Indonesia	3:58.37
1500 metres	Dương Văn Thái; Vietnam	3:58.02	not awarded		Ridwan; Indonesia	3:58.37
5000 metres	Nguyễn Văn Lai; Vietnam	14:19.35 NR	Boonthung Srisung; Thailand	14:21.75	Ridwan; Indonesia	14:27.69
10,000 metres	Nguyễn Văn Lai; Vietnam	29:44.82 NR	Boonthung Srisung; Thailand	29:46.61	Agus Prayogo; Indonesia	30:25.33
110 metres hurdles	Jamras Rittidet; Thailand	13.72 GR NR	Rayzam Shah Wan Sofian; Malaysia	14.00	Anousone Xaysa; Laos	14.17 NR
400 metres hurdles	Eric Cray; Philippines	51.29	Andrian; Indonesia	51.74	Đào Xuân Cường; Vietnam	51.79
3000 metres steeplechase	Christopher Ulboc Jr; Philippines	9:01.59	Phạm Tiến Sản; Vietnam	9:02.50	Patikarn Pechsricha; Thailand	9:04.04
4 × 100 metres relay	Thailand; Ruttanapon Sowan; Aphisit Promkaew; Jirapong Meenapra; Suppachai Chimdee	39.75	Singapore; Muhammad Elfi Mustapa; Calvin Kang Li Loong; Cheng Wei Lee; Muhammad Amirudin Jamal	39.79	Indonesia; Yaspi Boby; Iswandi; Muhammad Fadlin; Muhammad Rozikin	40.15
4 × 400 metres relay	Philippines; Isidro Del Prado Jr; Edgardo Alejan Jr; Julius Felicisimo Nierras; Archand Christian Bagsit	3:09.32	Thailand; Treenate Krittanukulwong; Wannasa Srikharin; Saharat Sammayan; Khanom Nattapong	3:09.81	Malaysia; Schzuan Ahmad Rosely; Mohamad Arif Zulhilmi Alet; Yuvaraaj Panerselvam; Kannanthasan Subramaniam	3:15.06
Marathon	Mok Ying Ren; Singapore	2:28:36	Thaung Aye; Myanmar	2:29:50	Eric Panique; Philippines	2:30:30
20 kilometres walk	Hendro Yap; Indonesia	1:29:41	Võ Xuân Vĩnh; Vietnam	1:33:30	Myo Min Thiha; Myanmar	1:36:18
High jump	Nauraj Singh Randhawa; Malaysia	2.17 m	Đào Văn Thủy; Vietnam	2.13 m	Pramote Pumurai; Thailand	2.13 m
Pole vault	Kreeta Sintawacheewa; Thailand	5.15 m	Iskandar Alwi; Malaysia	5.10 m NR	Sompong Saombankuay; Thailand	5.00 m
Long jump	Henry Dagmil; Philippines	7.80 m	Supanara Sukhasvasti; Thailand	7.71 m	Phạm Văn Lâm; Vietnam	7.53 m
Triple jump	Nguyễn Văn Hùng; Vietnam	16.67 m GR NR	Hakimi Ismail; Malaysia	16.44 m NR	Theerayut Philakong; Thailand	16.26 m
Shot put	Thawat Khachin; Thailand	17.54 m	Adi Aliffuddin Hussin; Malaysia	17.10 m	Chatchawal Polyiam; Thailand	16.85 m
Discus throw	Irfan Shamshuddin; Malaysia	53.16 m NR	Narong Benjaroon; Thailand	52.45 m	Hermanto; Indonesia	51.96 m
Hammer throw	Tantipong Phetchaiya; Thailand	62.23 m GR NR	Arniel Ferrera; Philippines	61.18 m	Jackie Wong Siew Cheer; Malaysia	59.75 m NR
Javelin throw	Peerachet Jantra; Thailand	76.30 m GR NR	Hussadin Rodmanee; Thailand	75.43 m	Nguyễn Trường Giang; Vietnam	69.69 m
Decathlon	Jesson Ramil Cid; Philippines	7038 pts	Zakaria Malik; Indonesia	6711 pts	Nguyễn Văn Đạt; Vietnam	6383 pts

=== Women ===
Event	Gold		Silver		Bronze	
100 metres	Vũ Thị Hương; Vietnam	11.59	Neeranuch Klomdee; Thailand	11.85	Tassaporn Wannakit; Thailand	11.91
200 metres	Vũ Thị Hương; Vietnam	23.55	Neeranuch Klomdee; Thailand	24.02	Nguyễn Thị Oanh; Vietnam	24.13
400 metres	Treewadee Yongphan; Thailand	53.11	Quách Thị Lan; Vietnam	53.38	Nguyễn Thị Oanh; Vietnam	53.71
800 metres	Đỗ Thị Thảo; Vietnam	2:05.52	Vũ Thị Ly; Vietnam	2:07.25	Swe Li Myint; Myanmar	2:08.20
1500 metres	Đỗ Thị Thảo; Vietnam	4:22.64	Phyu War Thet; Myanmar	4:27.01	Aung Than Toe Khin Myo; Myanmar	4:32.33
5000 metres	Phyu War Thet; Myanmar	16:06.01 NR	Triyaningsih; Indonesia	16:24.36	Khin Mar Sal; Myanmar	17:37.57
10,000 metres	Triyaningsih; Indonesia	34:32.68	Phyu War Thet; Myanmar	34:39.32	Lodkeo Inthakoumman; Laos	37:41.96 NR
100 metres hurdles	Dedeh Erawati; Indonesia	13.53	Wallapa Punsoongneun; Thailand	13.71	Raja Nursheena Azhar; Malaysia	13.84
400 metres hurdles	Wassana Winatho; Thailand	58.85	Quách Thị Lan; Vietnam	58.93	Dipna Lim Prasad; Singapore	59.96
3000 metres steeplechase	Rini Budiarti; Indonesia	10:04.54	Nguyễn Thị Oanh; Vietnam	10:30.92	Jessica Barnard; Philippines	11:04.84 NR
4 × 100 metres relay	Thailand; Phatsorn Jaksuninkorn; Neeranuch Klomdee; Tassaporn Wannakit; Nongnuch Sanrat	44.42	Vietnam; Mai Thị Phương; Nguyễn Thị Ngọc Thẩm; Đỗ Thị Quyên; Vũ Thị Hương	44.99	Indonesia; Lusiana Satriani; Tri Setyo Utami; Niafatul Aini; Ni Nyoman Kerni	45.88
4 × 400 metres relay	Thailand; Phatsorn Jaksuninkorn; Atchima Engchuan; Pornpan Hoemhuk; Treewadee Yongphan	3:36.58	Vietnam; Quách Thị Lan; Nguyễn Thị Thúy; Nguyễn Thị Thúy; Nguyễn Thị Oanh	3:36.92 NR	Myanmar; Su Kyi Aung; Yin Yin Khine; Aye Aye Than; Swe Li Myint	3:42.88
Marathon	Phạm Thị Bình; Vietnam	2:45:34 NR	Myint Myint Aye; Myanmar	2:46:07	Pa Pa; Myanmar	2:49:01
20 kilometres walk	Nguyễn Thị Thanh Phúc; Vietnam	1:37:08 GR	Kay Khine Myo Tun; Myanmar	1:40:15	Tanaphon Assawawongcharoen; Thailand	1:44:16
High jump	Dương Thị Việt Anh; Vietnam	1.84 m	Wanida Boonwan; Thailand	1.80 m	Phạm Thị Diễm; Vietnam	1.80 m
Pole vault	Sukanya Chomchuendee; Thailand	4.21 m GR NR	Lê Thị Phương; Vietnam	4.10 m	Riezel Buenaventura; Philippines	3.80 m
Long jump	Maria Natalia Londa; Indonesia	6.39 m	Thitima Muangjan; Thailand	6.24 m	Bùi Thị Thu Thảo; Vietnam	6.14 m
Triple jump	Maria Natalia Londa; Indonesia	14.17 m GR NR	Thitima Muangjan; Thailand	14.16 m NR	Trần Huệ Hoa; Vietnam	14.12 m NR
Shot put	Zhang Guirong; Singapore	14.99 m	Du Xianhui; Singapore	14.92 m	Sawitri Thongchao; Thailand	14.82 m
Discus throw	Subenrat Insaeng; Thailand	56.77 m GR NR	Zhang Guirong; Singapore	42.26 m	Du Xianhui; Singapore	41.02 m
Hammer throw	Panwat Gimsrang; Thailand	54.96 m NR	Renee Kelly Lee Casier; Malaysia	53.12 m	Mingkamon Koomphon; Thailand	51.82 m
Javelin throw	Saowalak Pettong; Thailand	52.96 m	Natta Nachan; Thailand	50.37 m	Bùi Thị Xuân; Vietnam	48.31 m
Heptathlon	Wassana Winatho; Thailand	5556 pts	Narcisa Atienza; Philippines	5241 pts	Sunisa Khotseemueang; Thailand	5152 pts

== Medal table ==
* Host nation (Myanmar)

Rank	Nation	Gold	Silver	Bronze	Total
1	Thailand	17	13	10	40
2	Vietnam	11	10	12	33
3	Indonesia	6	4	7	17
4	Philippines	6	4	3	13
5	Malaysia	4	6	3	13
6	Singapore	2	3	3	8
7	Myanmar*	1	5	6	12
8	Laos	0	0	2	2
Totals (8 entries)		47	45	46	138
