= Mohammad Fadlin =

Indonesian sprinter

Personal information
- Born: 28 October 1989 (age 36)
- Education: University of Mataram

Sport
- Sport: Track and field
- Events: 100 metres, 200 metres
Medal record
Men's athletics
Representing Indonesia
Asian Games
Silver medal – second place	2018 Jakarta–Palembang	4 × 100 m relay
Islamic Solidarity Games
Bronze medal – third place	2013 Palembang	4 × 100 m relay
SEA Games
Gold medal – first place	2011 Jakarta–Palembang	4 × 100 m relay
Bronze medal – third place	2009 Vientiane	100 m
Bronze medal – third place	2009 Vientiane	4 × 100 m relay
Bronze medal – third place	2013 Naypyidaw	4 × 100 m relay
Bronze medal – third place	2015 Singapore	4 × 100 m relay

Mohammad Fadlin (born 28 October 1989) is an Indonesian athlete who specialises in the sprinting events. He represented his country at the 2011 World Championships. He completed his higher education at the University of Mataram.

== Career ==
He is known by the nickname Fadlin and competes in the 100 metres and 200 metres. His personal best times are 10.42 seconds with a headwind of -1.9 m/s in Jakarta on June 29, 2011, and 10.43 seconds with a tailwind of +0.7 in Bogor on September 22, 2016. He formerly held the Indonesian national record in the 4 × 100 metre relay with 39.78 seconds in Guangzhou on November 23, 2010, together with Suryo Agung Wibowo, Farrel Octaviandi, and Franklin Burumi, which was later improved to 38.77 seconds at the 2018 Asian Games.

His international career began in 2008. He competed at the 2008 Asian Indoor Championships in Doha with 7.05 seconds in the 60 metres, and the 2008 Asian Junior Championships in Jakarta with 7th place in the 100 metres with 10.66 seconds. At the 2009 SEA Games in Vientiane, he won a bronze medal in the 100 metres with 10.61 seconds, placed 5th in the 200 metres with 22.25 seconds, and won bronze in the 4 × 100 metre relay. At the 2010 Asian Games in Guangzhou, he placed 5th in the 4 × 100 metre relay with 39.87 seconds.

At the 2011 Asian Championships in Kobe, he placed 8th in the 100 metres with 10.49 seconds, and in the same year represented Indonesia at the 2011 World Championships in Daegu, South Korea, with 11.00 seconds in the heats of the 100 metres. At the 2011 SEA Games in Palembang, he placed 4th in the 100 metres with 10.51 seconds and won gold in the 4 × 100 metre relay with 39.91 seconds.

At the 2013 Universiade in Kazan, Russia, he recorded 21.93 seconds in the 200 metres. At the 2013 Islamic Solidarity Games in Palembang, he won bronze in the 4 × 100 metre relay with 40.37 seconds. At the 2013 SEA Games in Naypyidaw, he placed 8th in the 200 metres with 22.10 seconds and won bronze in the 4 × 100 metre relay with 40.15 seconds.

At the 2015 SEA Games in Singapore, he placed 7th in the 200 metres with 21.47 seconds and won bronze in the 4 × 100 metre relay with 39.32 seconds. At the 2016 Asian Indoor Championships in Doha, he placed 4th in the 60 metres with 6.75 seconds. His best achievement at the Asian level was at the 2018 Asian Games in Jakarta, where he won a silver medal in the 4 × 100 metre relay with a time of 38.77 seconds, which also became Indonesia's new national record.

== Competition record ==
Year	Competition	Venue	Position	Event	Notes
Representing Indonesia
2008	Asian Indoor Championships	Doha, Qatar	15th (h)	60 m	7.05
2008	Asian Junior Championships	Jakarta, Indonesia	7th	100 m	10.66
2008	Asian Junior Championships	Jakarta, Indonesia	–	4 × 100 m relay	DQ
2009	Asian Championships	Guangzhou, China	23rd (h)	100 m	10.86
2009	Asian Championships	Guangzhou, China	–	4 × 100 m relay	DNF
2009	SEA Games	Vientiane, Laos	3rd	100 m	10.61
2009	SEA Games	Vientiane, Laos	5th	200 m	22.25
2009	SEA Games	Vientiane, Laos	3rd	4 × 100 m relay	40.16
2010	Asian Games	Guangzhou, China	5th	4 × 100 m relay	39.87
2011	Asian Championships	Kobe, Japan	8th	100 m	10.49
2011	Asian Championships	Kobe, Japan	10th (h)	4 × 100 m relay	40.52
2011	World Championships	Daegu, South Korea	52nd (h)	100 m	11.00
2011	SEA Games	Palembang, Indonesia	4th	100 m	10.51
2011	SEA Games	Palembang, Indonesia	1st	4 × 100 m relay	39.91
2013	Universiade	Kazan, Russia	28th (h)	200 m	21.93
2013	Islamic Solidarity Games	Palembang, Indonesia	3rd	4 × 100 m relay	40.37
2013	SEA Games	Naypyidaw, Myanmar	8th	200 m	22.10
2013	SEA Games	Naypyidaw, Myanmar	3rd	4 × 100 m relay	40.15
2015	SEA Games	Singapore	7th	200 m	21.47
2015	SEA Games	Singapore	3rd	4 × 100 m relay	39.32
2016	Asian Indoor Championships	Doha, Qatar	4th	60 m	6.75
2018	Asian Games	Jakarta, Indonesia	2nd	4 × 100 m relay	38.77

== Personal bests ==
Outdoor

- 100 metres – 10.42 (-1.9 m/s, Jakarta 2011)
- 200 metres – 21.04 (Rumbai 2012)

Indoor

- 60 metres – 6.74 (Doha 2016)
