= Treewadee Yongphan =

Thai sprinter (born 1987)

Personal information
- Born: 29 September 1987 (age 38)
- Height: 1.66 m (5 ft 5 in)
- Weight: 53 kg (117 lb)

Sport
- Sport: Athletics
- Event: 400 metres
Medal record
Women's athletics
Representing Thailand
Asian Indoor Championships
Silver medal – second place	2014 Hangzhou	4×400 m
Bronze medal – third place	2008 Doha	4×400 m

Treewadee Yongphan (born 3 March 1987) is a Thai sprinter specialising in the 400 metres. She won several medals at regional level.

== International competitions ==
Year	Competition	Venue	Position	Event	Notes
Representing Thailand
2005	Asian Indoor Games	Pattaya, Thailand	4th	400 m	54.98
2005	Asian Indoor Games	Pattaya, Thailand	2nd	4 × 400 m relay	3:48.25
2006	Asian Indoor Championships	Pattaya, Thailand	4th	400 m	57.38
2006	Asian Junior Championships	Macau, China	5th	400 m	57.29
2006	Asian Junior Championships	Macau, China	2nd	4 × 400 m relay	3:44.61
2007	Asian Indoor Games	Macau, China	9th (h)	400 m	57.18
2008	Asian Indoor Championships	Doha, Qatar	3rd	4 × 400 m relay	3:43.22
2009	Asian Indoor Games	Hanoi, Vietnam	4th	400 m	54.98
2009	Asian Indoor Games	Hanoi, Vietnam	3rd	4 × 400 m relay	3:41.37
2009	Asian Championships	Guangzhou, China	8th	400 m	55.56
2009	Asian Championships	Guangzhou, China	5th	4 × 400 m relay	3:38.73
2009	Southeast Asian Games	Vientiane, Laos	1st	400 m	54.16
2009	Southeast Asian Games	Vientiane, Laos	1st	4 × 400 m relay	3:38.51
2010	Asian Games	Guangzhou, China	12th (h)	400 m	56.59
2011	Southeast Asian Games	Palembang, Indonesia	1st	400 m	54.13
2011	Southeast Asian Games	Palembang, Indonesia	1st	4 × 400 m relay	3:41.35
2013	Southeast Asian Games	Naypyidaw, Myanmar	1st	400 m	53.11
2013	Southeast Asian Games	Naypyidaw, Myanmar	1st	4 × 400 m relay	3:36.58
2014	Asian Indoor Championships	Hangzhou, China	2nd	4 × 400 m relay	3:42.55
2014	Asian Games	Incheon, South Korea	4th	4 × 400 m relay	3:33.16
2015	Southeast Asian Games	Singapore	4th	400 m	55.13
2015	Southeast Asian Games	Singapore	2nd	4 × 400 m relay	3:36.82
2017	Southeast Asian Games	Kuala Lumpur, Malaysia	2nd	4 × 400 m relay	3:38.95
2017	Asian Indoor and Martial Arts Games	Ashgabat, Turkmenistan	1st	4 × 400 m relay	3:43.41

== Personal bests ==
Outdoor

- 400 metres – 53.11 (Naypiydaw 2013)
- 800 metres – 2:11.48 (Khon Kaen 2012)

Indoor

- 400 metres – 54.98 (Hanoi 2009)
