= Dương Thị Việt Anh =

Vietnamese high jumper (born 1989)

Personal information
- Born: 30 December 1989 (age 36) Vĩnh Lợi, Bạc Liêu, Vietnam
- Height: 1.75 m (5 ft 9 in)
- Weight: 62 kg (137 lb)

Sport
- Sport: Athletics
- Event: High jump
Medal record
Women's athletics
Representing Vietnam
Asian Indoor Championships
Silver medal – second place	2012 Hangzhou	Pentathlon
Bronze medal – third place	2012 Hangzhou	High jump
Southeast Asian Games
Gold medal – first place	2011 Palembang	High jump
Gold medal – first place	2013 Naypyidaw	High jump
Gold medal – first place	2017 Kuala Lumpur	High jump
Bronze medal – third place	2009 Vientiane	High jump
Bronze medal – third place	2011 Palembang	Heptathlon

Dương Thị Việt Anh (born 30 December 1989) is a Vietnamese athlete competing in the high jump.

== International competitions ==
Year	Competition	Venue	Position	Event	Notes
Representing Vietnam
2008	Asian Junior Championships	Jakarta, Indonesia	3rd	High jump	1.70 m
2009	Asian Indoor Games	Hanoi, Vietnam	5th	Pentathlon	3547 pts
2009	Southeast Asian Games	Vientiane, Laos	3rd	High jump	1.88 m
2009	Southeast Asian Games	Vientiane, Laos	4th	Hepthathlon	4657 pts
2010	Asian Indoor Championships	Tehran, Iran	4th	High jump	1.83 m
2011	Asian Championships	Kobe, Japan	–	Heptathlon	DNF
2011	Southeast Asian Games	Palembang, Indonesia	1st	High jump	1.90 m
2011	Southeast Asian Games	Palembang, Indonesia	3rd	Heptathlon	5196 pts
2012	Asian Indoor Championships	Hangzhou, China	3rd	High jump	1.84 m
2012	Asian Indoor Championships	Hangzhou, China	2nd	Pentathlon	3812 pts
2012	Olympic Games	London, United Kingdom	29th (q)	High jump	1.80 m
2013	Southeast Asian Games	Naypyidaw, Myanmar	1st	High jump	1.84 m
2017	Southeast Asian Games	Kuala Lumpur, Malaysia	1st	High jump	1.83 m
2017	Asian Indoor and Martial Arts Games	Ashgabat, Turkmenistan	5th	High jump	1.75 m
2018	Asian Games	Jakarta, Indonesia	6th	High jump	1.80 m
