= Phyu War Thet =

Burmese long-distance runner

Medal record

Women's athletics

Representing Myanmar

Southeast Asian Games
Gold medal – first place	2013 Naypyidaw	5000 m
Silver medal – second place	2003 Hanoi	5000 m
Silver medal – second place	2011 Palembang	5000 m
Silver medal – second place	2013 Naypyidaw	1500 m
Silver medal – second place	2013 Naypyidaw	10000 m
Bronze medal – third place	2001 Kuala Lumpur	1500 m
Bronze medal – third place	2007 Korat	5000 m
Bronze medal – third place	2015 Singapore	1500 m
Bronze medal – third place	2015 Singapore	5000 m

Phyu War Thet (born 11 May 1985) is a track and field athlete from Myanmar. She won her first (and currently only) Southeast Asian Games gold medal in the women's 5000 metres at the 2013 Southeast Asian Games in her home country. She also won silver in the 1500 metres and 10,000 metres races at the same event. She competed barefoot in Southeast Asian Games events before 2013, .
