= Trần Huệ Hoa =

Vietnamese triple jumper

Trần Huệ Hoa (born 8 August 1991) is a Vietnamese triple jumper.

She won the silver medal (in high jump) at the 2010 Asian Junior Championships, and then the gold medal at the 2011 Southeast Asian Games, the bronze medal at the 2013 Southeast Asian Games, finished fifth at the 2013 Asian Championships, eighth at the 2014 Asian Games won the silver medal at the 2015 Southeast Asian Games and no-marked at the 2016 Asian Indoor Championships.

Her personal best jump is 14.12 metres, achieved at the Southeast Asian Games in Naypyidaw.
