= Fernando Lumain =

Indonesian sprinter (born 1995)

Personal information
- Nationality: Indonesia
- Born: 18 October 1995 (age 30) Tondano, North Sulawesi, Indonesia
- Height: 1.83 m (6 ft 0 in)

Sport
- Sport: Athletics
Medal record
Representing Indonesia
Men's athletics
SEA Games
Gold medal – first place	2011 Palembang	4×100 m relay

Fernando Lumain (born 18 October 1989) is an Indonesian sprinter. At the 2012 Summer Olympics, he competed in the Men's 100 metres where he finished with a seasonal best time of 10.80 seconds in the preliminaries but was eliminated in the first round.
