= Saysana =

Saysana is a surname. Notable people with the surname include:

- Lembo Saysana (born 1995), Laotian footballer
- Sopha Saysana (born 1992), Laotian footballer
