= Tan Song Hwa =

Malaysian hammer thrower

Personal information
- Born: 28 July 1986 (age 39) kuantan, Pahang

Chinese name
- Traditional Chinese: 陳雙華
- Simplified Chinese: 陈双华
- Hanyu Pinyin: Chén Shuānghuá
- Hokkien POJ: Tân Sianghôa

Sport
- Country: Malaysia

Achievements and titles
- Personal best: Hammer Throw: 58.71 NR
Medal record
Women's athletics
SEA Games
Gold medal – first place	2009 Laos	Hammer Throw
Gold medal – first place	2011 Palembang	Hammer Throw

Tan Song Hwa (born 28 July 1986) is a Malaysian athlete who specialises in hammer throw. Her personal best is 58.71m, achieved on 15 June 2011 at Szombathely, Hungary. Tan won the women's hammer throw gold medal at the 2009 Southeast Asian Games.

In 2011 SEA Games, in spite of pain due to a back injury, Tan retained her gold medal in the women's Hammer Throw which she won in the 2009 edition in Laos. She hurled the implement a distance of 55.15m.
