= Vũ Thị Hương =

Vietnamese sprinter

Medal record

Women's athletics

Representing Vietnam

Asian Games
Silver medal – second place	2010 Guangzhou	200 m
Bronze medal – third place	2010 Guangzhou	100 m

Asian Indoor Games
Gold medal – first place	2009 Hanoi	60 m

Asian Championships
Silver medal – second place	2007 Amman	100 m
Silver medal – second place	2009 Guangzhou	100 m
Silver medal – second place	2009 Guangzhou	200 m
Bronze medal – third place	2007 Amman	200 m

Southeast Asian Games
Gold medal – first place	2005 Manila	100 m
Gold medal – first place	2007 Khorat	100 m
Gold medal – first place	2007 Khorat	200 m
Gold medal – first place	2009 Vientiane	100 m
Gold medal – first place	2009 Vientiane	200 m
Gold medal – first place	2013 Naypyidaw	100 m
Gold medal – first place	2013 Naypyidaw	200 m
Silver medal – second place	2003 Hanoi	4×100 m relay
Silver medal – second place	2005 Manila	200 m
Bronze medal – third place	2003 Hanoi	100 m

Vũ Thị Hương (born October 7, 1986, in Định Hóa, Thái Nguyên) is a former track and field sprint athlete who competes internationally for Vietnam.

Hương represented Vietnam at the 2008 Summer Olympics in Beijing. She competed at the 100 metres sprint and placed third in her first round heat after Kim Gevaert and Yulia Nestsiarenka in a time of 11.65 seconds. She qualified for the second round in which she failed to qualify for the semi-finals as her time of 11.70 was the eighth and slowest time of her race. At the first elimination round, she beat some contestants including Chisato Fukushima of Japan and Halimat Ismaila of Nigeria.

Hương was coached by Nguyễn Đình Minh, 1988 Olympic sprinter for Vietnam.
