= Trương Thanh Hằng =

Vietnamese middle-distance runner

Personal information
- Born: 1 May 1986 (age 40) Ho Chi Minh City, Vietnam
Medal record
Women's athletics
Representing Vietnam
Asian Games
Silver medal – second place	2010 Guangzhou	800 m
Silver medal – second place	2010 Guangzhou	1500 m
Asian Championships
Gold medal – first place	2007 Amman	800 m
Gold medal – first place	2011 Kobe	800 m
Silver medal – second place	2011 Kobe	1500 m
Bronze medal – third place	2007 Amman	1500 m
Bronze medal – third place	2009 Guangzhou	800 m
Bronze medal – third place	2009 Guangzhou	1500 m
Asian Indoor Championships
Gold medal – first place	2010 Tehran	800 m
Southeast Asian Games
Gold medal – first place	2005 Manila	1500 m
Gold medal – first place	2007 Khorat	800 m
Gold medal – first place	2007 Khorat	1500 m
Gold medal – first place	2009 Vientiane	800 m
Gold medal – first place	2009 Vientiane	1500 m
Gold medal – first place	2011 Palembang	800 m
Gold medal – first place	2011 Palembang	1500 m
Bronze medal – third place	2005 Manila	800 m

Trương Thanh Hằng (born 1 May 1986 in Ho Chi Minh City) is a Vietnamese track and field athlete who specialises in middle-distance running events. She is the Vietnamese record holder over both 800 metres and 1500 metres.

== Career ==
Born in Ho Chi Minh City, Thanh Hang won a national title over 1500 metres in 2004 and began to represent her country internationally the following year, beginning with a sixth-place finish at the 2005 Asian Athletics Championships. She won the 1500 m gold medal at the 2005 Southeast Asian Games, breaking the Games record and Vietnamese national record, and she also claimed the bronze medal in the women's 800 metres. Her next major competition was the 2006 Asian Games and she was knocked out in the qualifying rounds of the 800 m, but took fourth in her 1500 m speciality, improving her national mark to 4:17.66 minutes in the process.

At the 2007 Asian Athletics Championships Thanh Hang won the 800 m gold but was third in the 1500 m, behind Sinimole Paulose and Sara Bekheet. Further success came at the regional 2007 Southeast Asian Games, as she completed an 800/1500 m double with national record runs of 2:02.39 and 4:11.60 minutes. She attended no major events in 2008 but won a series of medals in late 2009. She won two bronze medals at the 2009 Asian Athletics Championships and gained an 800 m silver and 1500 m bronze at the 2009 Asian Indoor Games, setting national indoor records at both distances. She retained her titles at the 2009 Southeast Asian Games the following month, while her male compatriot Nguyen Dinh Cuong made it a middle-distance sweep for Vietnam.

She began her 2010 season at the 2010 Asian Indoor Athletics Championships in Tehran and was a comfortable winner of the 800 m. The 2010 Asian Games saw her career reach new heights as she knocked nearly five seconds off her 1500 m best to take the silver in a time of 4:09.58 minutes, beaten only by Maryam Yusuf Jamal the reigning world champion. Similar improvements came in the 800 m, where her new national record mark of 2:00.91 minutes brought another silver medal.

At age of 25, Truong Thanh Hang has 5 gold medals from SEA Games, with the addition of three golds from the Asian championships. On that basis, the 2011 Southeast Asia Games was probably to serve only as a “cool down” to wrap up her busy season, before starting the build-up for the London Olympics. Thanh Hang delivered two gold medals as expected in both 800m and 1500m, clocking 2:02.65 and 4:15.75 respectively. The good times achieved following a closer battle from teammate Do Thi Thao who finished in second in both 800m (2:05.62) and 1500m (4:18.94). At the recent Asian championships she claimed the gold medal at 800m with 2:01.41, winning the silver in the 1500m (4:18.40).
