= Ni Lar San =

Burmese marathon runner

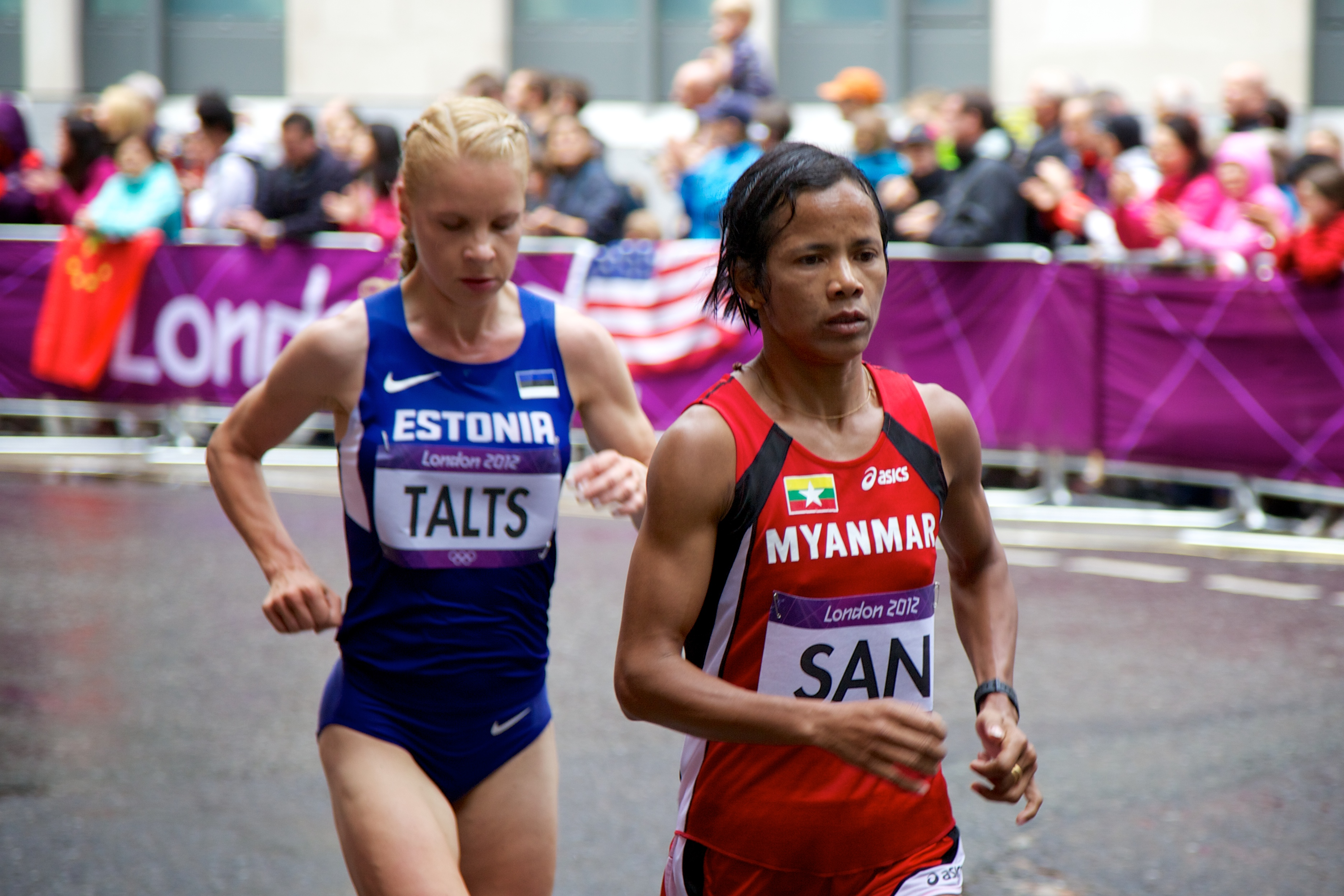
- Ni Lar San (right) with Evelin Talts at the Women's marathon in London 2012.

Personal information
- Born: October 7, 1984 (age 41)
- Height: 1.6 m (5 ft 3 in)
- Weight: 50 kg (110 lb)

Sport
- Country: Myanmar
- Sport: Athletics
- Event: Marathon

Ni Lar San (7 October 1984) is a Burmese marathon runner who competed in the marathon event at the 2012 Summer Olympics. She finished 3rd to last (105th place) in the women's marathon, with a time of 3:04:27.
