= List of Singaporean records in athletics =

The following are the national records in athletics in Singapore maintained by Singapore Athletics (SA).

== Outdoor ==
Key to tables: Awaiting ratification Record not kept by SA Not ratified or later rescinded by SA

=== Men ===
Event	Record	Athlete	Date	Meet	Place	Ref.
100 m	10.27 (+2.0 m/s)	Marc Brian Louis	30 September 2023	Asian Games	Hangzhou, China	
100 m	10.2 h	Muhamad Hosni Muhamad	3 July 1994	19th Flash Athletics Club Championships	Singapore	
200 m	20.72 (+0.2 m/s)	Marc Brian Louis	13 December 2025	Southeast Asian Games	Bangkok, Thailand	
400 m	47.02	Zubin Percy Muncherji	13 May 2018	Big Ten Championships	Bloomington, United States	
800 m	1:49.94	Thiruben Thana Rajan	30 May 2025	Asian Championships	Gumi, South Korea	
800 m	1:49.9 h	Subramani Surendra	30 April 1983	Oregon Track Club mini meet	Eugene, United States	
1000 m	2:31.05	Jayden Tan	6 March 2025	Box Hill Burn	Box Hill, Australia	
1500 m	3:51.10	Lui Yuan Chow	13 March 2020	Victorian Milers Club Meet #5	Melbourne, Australia	
Mile (track)	4:20.83	Lui Yuan Chow	18 February 2020	Victorian Milers Club Meet #4	Melbourne, Australia	
Mile (road)	4:18.6 h	Shaun Goh	13 June 2026	BIG Mile	Utrecht, Netherlands	
2400 m	6:47.01	Shaun Goh	15 August 2026	Pocari Sweat 2.4 km Run	Singapore	
3000 m	8:28.83 (Note: National Best Performance)	Lui Yuan Chow	21 December 2019	Steigen Spectacular	Geelong, Australia	
5000 m	14:44.21	Soh Rui Yong	17 July 2021	Singapore Athletics Series 4	Singapore	
5000 m	14:36.22	Soh Rui Yong	9 July 2026	Tracksmith Twilight 5000	London, United Kingdom	
5 km (road)	14:47	Shaun Goh	19 September 2026	World Road Running Championships	Copenhagen, Denmark	
10,000 m	30:24.19	Soh Rui Yong	15 November 2026	253rd Tokai University Long Distance Challenge	Kanagawa, Japan	
10 km (road)	30:16	Shaun Goh	27 September 2026	Vitality London 10,000	London, United Kingdom	
15 km (road)	46:20+	Shaun Goh	25 October 2026	Valencia Half Marathon	Valencia, Spain	
20 km (road)	1:01:36+	Shaun Goh	25 October 2026	Valencia Half Marathon	Valencia, Spain	
Half marathon	1:05:01	Shaun Goh	25 October 2026	Valencia Half Marathon	Valencia, Spain	
Marathon	2:22:59	Soh Rui Yong	5 December 2021	Valencia Marathon	Valencia, Spain	
50 km (road)	3:39:03+	Ben Khoo	12 September 2026	RUN Winschoten	Winschoten, Netherlands	
100 km (road)	7:39:16	Ben Khoo	12 September 2026	RUN Winschoten	Winschoten, Netherlands	
110 m hurdles	13.77 (+1.5 m/s)	Ang Chen Xiang	7 June 2025	Taiwan Open	Taipei City, Taiwan	
400 m hurdles	49.75	Calvin Quek	20 August 2025	The 20th Twilight Games	Yokohama, Japan	
3000 m steeplechase	9:11.24	Mathevan Maran	19 October 1991	Asian Championships	Kuala Lumpur, Malaysia	
High jump	2.25 m	Kampton Kam	11 April 2025	South Florida Invitational	Tampa, United States	
Pole vault	5.34 m	Low Jun Yu	5 July 2024	ASEAN University Games	Surabaya, Indonesia	
Long jump	7.62 m	Matthew Goh Yujie	15 December 2009	Southeast Asian Games	Vientiane, Laos	
Triple jump	16.09 m (+0.1 m/s)	Gabriel Lee Jing Yi	11 December 2025	Southeast Asian Games	Bangkok, Thailand	
Shot put	17.44 m	Dong Enxin	23 September 2003		Manila, Philippines	
Shot put	17.48 m	Dong Enxin (Note: as a Chinese citizen)	19 May 2001		Manila, Philippines	
Discus throw	59.87 m	James Wong Tuck Yim	8 May 1999		Wiesbaden, Germany	
Hammer throw	58.20 m	James Wong Tuck Yim	7 April 1999		Halle, Germany	
Javelin throw	61.07 m	Justyn Phoa Zairen	27 November 2020	SA Performance Trial 1	Singapore	
Decathlon	6393 pts h	Tang Ngai Kin	2–3 September 1978		Singapore	
Decathlon	100m (wind) / Long jump (wind) / Shot put / High jump / 400m / 110m H (wind) / Discus / Pole vault / Javelin / 1500m; 10.9 / 6.87 m / 11.30 m / 1.85 m / 51.5 / 15.6 / 29.68 m / 3.60 m / 48.02 m / 5:05.5					
10,000 m walk (track)	46:25.76	Jairajkumar Jeyabal	5 December 1996		New Delhi, India	
10 km walk (road)	45:55+	Sim Soon Chye Edmund	11 March 2012	Asian Race Walking Championships	Nomi, Japan	
15 km walk (road)	1:11:56+	Sim Soon Chye Edmund	20 March 2016	Asian Race Walking Championships	Nomi, Japan	
20,000 m walk (track)	1:38:19.5	Khoo Ching Mong Ricky	18 April 1993		Manila, Philippines	
20 km walk (road)	1:34:49	Sim Soon Chye Edmund	20 March 2016	Asian Race Walking Championships	Nomi, Japan	
50 km walk (road)	5:07:03	Arumugan Kannan	9 December 1969		Rangoon, Myanmar	
4 × 100 m relay	39.24	Singapore; Kang Li Loong Calvin; Yeo Foo Ee Gary; Lee Cheng Wei; Muhammad Amirudin Jamal	12 June 2015	Southeast Asian Games	Kallang, Singapore	
4 × 400 m relay	3:10.11	Singapore; Ng Chin Hui; Zubin Percy Muncherji; Thiruben Thana Rajan; Calvin Quek	12 May 2023 (Note: by official result source; 12 October by SA source, a typo)	Southeast Asian Games	Phnom Penh, Cambodia	

=== Women ===
Event	Record	Athlete	Date	Meet	Place	Ref.
100 m	11.20 (±0.0 m/s)	Shanti Pereira	14 July 2023	Asian Championships	Bangkok, Thailand	
200 m	22.57 (−0.4 m/s)	Shanti Pereira	23 August 2023	World Championships	Budapest, Hungary	
400 m	53.67	Shanti Pereira	30 March 2024	Florida Relays	Gainesville, United States	
800 m	2:07.79	Goh Chui Ling	3 June 2023	Sparkassen Gala Regensburg	Regensburg, Germany	
800 m	2:07.4 h	Chee Swee Lee	31 May 1976		San Diego, United States	
1000 m	2:55.96	Romaine Rui-Min Soh	6 March 2025	Box Hill Burn	Box Hill, Australia	
1500 m	4:26.33	Goh Chui Ling	9 May 2023	Southeast Asian Games	Phnom Penh, Cambodia	
Mile (track)	5:10.86	Vanessa Lee Ying Zhuang	17 January 2026	West Mile Showdown	Waddell, United States	
Mile (road)	5:24.19 Wo	Romaine Rui-Min Soh	1 October 2023	World Road Running Championships	Riga, Latvia	
2400 m	7:48.49	Goh Chui Ling	20 August 2022	Pocari 2.4 km Run	Singapore	
3000 m	9:51.16	Goh Chui Ling	5 August 2022	Neustädter Läufermeeting	Neustadt an der Waldnaab, Germany	
5000 m	17:06.69 (Note: by World Athletics and SA sources; 17:06.68 by official result source)	Vanessa Lee Ying Zhuang	6 March 2025	Box Hill Burn	Box Hill, Australia	
5 km (road)	16:57	Vanessa Lee Ying Zhuang	5 July 2025	Gold Coast Marathon 5K	Gold Coast, Australia	
10,000 m	36:00.95	Vanessa Lee Ying Zhuang	24 September 2026	Asian Games	Nagoya, Japan	
10 km (road)	35:55	Vanessa Lee Ying Zhuang	7 July 2024	Gold Coast Marathon	Gold Coast, Australia	
10 km (road)	34:25	Yvonne Danson	19 November 1995		Melbourne, Australia	
Half marathon	1:16:04	Vanessa Lee Ying Zhuang	4 July 2026	China Airlines Half Marathon	Gold Coast, Australia	
Marathon	2:34:41	Yvonne Danson	13 December 1995	Southeast Asian Games	Chiang Mai, Thailand	
Marathon	2:30:53 a (Note: as British citizen)	Yvonne Danson	17 April 1995	Boston Marathon	Boston, United States	
100 m hurdles	13.80 (+1.6 m/s)	Kerstin Ong	9 May 2026	Hong Kong Championships	Hong Kong, China	
400 m hurdles	58.93	Dipna Lim Prasad	26 August 2018	Asian Games	Jakarta, Indonesia	
3000 m steeplechase	11:02.65	Vanessa Lee Ying Zhuang	21 November 2026	Denise Boyd Shield Meet 2026	Queensland, Australia	
High jump	1.86 m	Michelle Sng	30 October 2021		Singapore	
Pole vault	3.91 m	Rachel Yang	13 June 2017	Thailand Open	Bangkok, Thailand	
Long jump	6.18 m (+0.9 m/s)	Tan Eugenia Yan Ning	10 June 2015	Southeast Asian Games	Kallang, Singapore	
Triple jump	12.92 m (−2.9 m/s)	Tia Rozario	7 May 2023 (Note: by World Athletics source; 6 May 2023 by SAAA source)	Ivy League Heptagonal Championships	Philadelphia, United States	
Shot put	18.57 m	Zhang Gui Rong	1 September 2005		Incheon, South Korea	
Discus throw	49.91 m	Zhang Gui Rong	8 December 2003	Southeast Asian Games	Hanoi, Vietnam	
Hammer throw	38.57 m	Valerie Loong Jia Li	21 January 2018	SAA Track and Field Series 1	Singapore	
Javelin throw	51.66 m	Zhang Gui Rong	11 December 2003	Southeast Asian Games	Hanoi, Vietnam	
Heptathlon	5116 pts	Yu Long Nyu	15–16 June 1993		Singapore	
Heptathlon	100m H (wind) / High jump / Shot put / 200m (wind) / Long jump (wind) / Javelin / 800m; 14.88 / 1.74 m / 9.19 m / 25.18 / 5.88 m (+0.9 m/s) / 31.42 m / 2:30.18					
5000 m walk (track)	25:40.08	Low Guan Hoon Helen	3 December 1991	Southeast Asian Games	Manila, Philippines	
10,000 m walk (track)	53:33.46	Low Guan Hoon Helen	17 December 1989		New Delhi, India	
10 km walk (road)	51:05.0	Low Guan Hoon Helen	11 August 1991		Kuala Lumpur, Malaysia	
20 km walk (road)	1:58:26	Tin Shu Min	31 January 2015		Singapore	
50 km walk (road)						
4 × 100 m relay	44.41	Singapore; Kerstin Ong; Elizabeth-Ann Tan; Laavinia Jaiganth; Shanti Pereira	16 December 2025	Southeast Asian Games	Bangkok, Thailand	
4 × 400 m relay	3:40.58	Singapore; Piriyah T Dipna Lim Prasad; Goh Chui Ling; Veronica Shanti Pereira	11 June 2015	Southeast Asian Games	Kallang, Singapore	

=== Mixed ===
Event	Record	Athlete	Date	Meet	Place	Ref.
4 × 100 m relay	41.19	Singapore; Marc Brian Louis; Shanti Pereira; Tate Tan; Elizabeth-Ann Tan	23 September 2026	20th Asian Games	Nagoya, Japan	
4 × 400 m relay	3:33.26	Singapore; Shanti Pereira; Calvin Quek; Wei Bin Ow Yeong; Goh Chui Ling	11 June 2021	SA Performance Trial 2	Singapore	

== Indoor ==
=== Men ===
Event	Record	Athlete	Date	Meet	Place	Ref.
55 m	6.51	Shafiq Kashmiri	23 February 2008	Princeton Invitation	Lawrenceville, United States	
60 m	6.68	Marc Brian Louis	1 March 2025	10th International Tournament for the Prizes of Olga Rypakova	Oskemen, Kazakhstan	
60 m	6.68	Marc Brian Louis	21 March 2025	World Championships	Nanjing, China	
60 m	6.68	Marc Brian Louis	20 March 2026	World Championships	Toruń, Poland	
200 m	22.60	Zubin Muncherji	26 January 2018	Indiana University Relays	Geneva, United States	
300 m	34.41	Shafiq Kashmiri	8 December 2007	Princeton New Year Invitational	Princeton, United States	
400 m	47.82	Zubin Muncherji	23/24 February 2018	Big Ten Championships	Geneva, United States	
500 m	1:03.72	Zubin Muncherji	7 December 2018	Hoosier Open	Bloomington, United States	
600 m	1:18.60	Zubin Muncherji	22 February 2019	Big Ten Championships	Ann Arbor, United States	
800 m	1:55.63	Jian Yong Leo Fang	16 February 2014	Asian Championships	Hangzhou, China	
1500 m	4:09.50	Jian Yong Leo Fang	20 February 2016	Asian Championships	Doha, Qatar	
Mile	4:27.13	Ethan Yan	18 February 2023	Panther Tune-Up	Milwaukee, United States	
3000 m	9:10.38	Ethan Yan	4 February 2023	Big Dog Invitational	Stevens Point, United States	
60 m hurdles	7.91	Ang Chen Xiang	20 March 2022 (Note: by official result source; 23 March 2022 by Singapore Athletics source, a typo)	World Championships	Belgrade, Serbia	
High jump	2.20 m	Kampton Kam	10 February 2024	Darius Dixon Memorial	Lynchburg, United States	
Pole vault	5.00 m	Low Jun Yu	13 January 2024	ATSVI Hallenmeeting	Innsbruck, Austria	
Pole vault	5.00 m	Low Jun Yu	20 January 2024	Stadtwerke Sindelfingen Hallenmeeting	Sindelfingen, Germany	
Long jump	7.08 m	Chew Han Wei	18 February 2012	Cornell Deneault Memorial	Ithaca, United States	
Triple jump	15.71 m	Stefan Tseng Ke Cheng	23 February 2008	AVIVA Indoor Grand Prix	Birmingham, United Kingdom	
Shot put	15.84 m A	Wong Kai Yuen	21 January 2018 (Note: by federation source; 20 January 2018 by result source)	Dr. Martin Luther King Collegiate Invitational	Albuquerque, United States	
Heptathlon	4478 pts	Raeshon Loo Wei Ming	28 February–1 March 2026	Estonian Championships	Tallinn, Estonia	
Heptathlon	60m / Long jump / Shot put / High jump / 60m H / Pole vault / 1000m; 7.35 / 6.35 m / 12.18 m / 1.69 m / 9.20 / 3.96 m / 3:07.68					
5000 m walk						
4 × 400 m relay						

=== Women ===
Event	Record	Athlete	Date	Meet	Place	Ref.
60 m	7.61	Shanti Pereira	15 February 2014	Asian Championships	Hangzhou, China	
200 m	25.94	Valerie Seema Pereira	25 February 2006	Aviva Indoor Grand Prix	Birmingham, United Kingdom	
300 m	48.43	Wong Si Min Levyn	13 March 2022		Manchester, United Kingdom	
400 m	59.14	Laavinia Jaiganth	6 February 2026	Asian Championships	Tianjin, China	
600 m	1:47.65	Wong Si Min Levyn	5 March 2022		Manchester, United Kingdom	
800 m	2:27.31	Nicole Ann Isabella Yun Mun	19 February 2016	Asian Championships	Doha, Qatar	
1500 m	5:09.76	Vanessa Lee Ying Zhuang	6 February 2026	Asian Championships	Tianjin, China	
3000 m	10:29.87	Vanessa Lee Ying Zhuang	7 February 2026	Asian Championships	Tianjin, China	
5000 m	18:43.20	Faith Zhen Ford	30 January 2026	Penn State National Open	University Park, United States	
60 m hurdles	8.53	Nur Izlyn Bte Zaini	18 February 2019	Sun Belt Conference Championships	Birmingham, United States	
High jump	1.75 m	Michelle Sng Suat Li	21 February 2016	Asian Championships	Doha, Qatar	
Pole vault	3.60 m	Esther Tay	7 February 2026	Asian Championships	Tianjin, China	
Pole vault	3.60 m	Esther Tay	14 December 2025	Cardiff Met Christmas Classic	Cardiff, United Kingdom	
Long jump	5.96 m	Tia Rozario	8 February 2026	Asian Championships	Tianjin, China	
Triple jump	12.91 m	Tia Rozario	7 February 2026	Asian Championships	Tianjin, China	
Shot put	17.99 m	Zhang Guirong	15 November 2005	Asian Indoor Games	Pattaya, Thailand	
Pentathlon						
Pentathlon	60m H / High jump / Shot put / Long jump / 800m					
3000 m walk						
4 × 400 m relay						
