= Athletics at the 2023 SEA Games – Women's Results =

The women's athletics competitions at the 2023 SEA Games in Cambodia took place between 6 and 1 May 2023. Track and field events took place at the Morodok Techo National Stadium in Phnom Penh while the marathon and 20 km walk events took place at Angkor Wat.

The 2023 Games featured competitions in 22 events.

== 100 metre ==
Athletics – Women's 100 metre at the 2023 SEA Games
- Venue: Morodok Techo National Stadium
- Date: 12 May 2023
- Competitors: 13 from 7 nations

Medalists
gold medal	Shanti Pereira	Singapore
silver medal	Supanich Poolkerd	Thailand
bronze medal	Trần Thị Nhi Yến	Vietnam

=== Records ===
Prior to this competition, the existing Asian and SEA Games records were as follows:

AR	Li Xuemei (CHN)	10.79	Shanghai, China	18 October 1997
GR	Lydia De Vega (PHI)	11.28	Jakarta, Indonesia	16 September 1987

=== Results ===
Heat 1

Rank	Athlete	Time	Notes
1	Supanich Poolkerd (THA)	11.63	Q
2	Kristina Knott (PHI)	11.66	Q
3	Zaidatul Husniah Zulkifli (MAS)	11.69	Q
4	Hoang Du Y (VIE)	11.73	q
5	Elizabeth-Ann Tan Shee Ru (SGP)	12.00	q
6	Sang Lida (CAM)	12.39	

Heat 2

Rank	Athlete	Time	Notes
1	Shanti Pereira (SGP)	11.49	Q
2	Trần Thị Nhi Yến (VIE)	11.71	Q
3	Nur Aishah Rofina Aling (MAS)	12.04	Q
4	On-Uma Chattha (THA)	12.28	
5	Kyla Ashley Maico Richardson (PHI)	12.40	
6	Silina Pha Aphay (LAO)	12.59	
7	Duong Sreypheap (CAM)	12.71	

Finals

Rank	Athlete	Time	Notes
1st place, gold medalist(s)	Shanti Pereira (SGP)	11.41	
2nd place, silver medalist(s)	Supanich Poolkerd (THA)	11.58	
3rd place, bronze medalist(s)	Trần Thị Nhi Yến (VIE)	11.75	
4	Zaidatul Husniah Zulkifli (MAS)	11.83	
5	Hoang Du Y (VIE)	11.85	
6	Elizabeth-Ann Tan Shee Ru (SGP)	11.96	
7	Nur Aishah Rofina Aling (MAS)	12.12	
—	Kristina Knott (PHI)	—	DNS

== 200 metre ==
Athletics – Women's 200 metre at the 2023 SEA Games
- Venue: Morodok Techo National Stadium
- Date: 8 May 2023
- Competitors: 11 from 6 nations

Medalists
gold medal	Shanti Pereira	Singapore
silver medal	Trần Thị Nhi Yến	Vietnam
bronze medal	Zaidatul Husniah Zulkifli	Malaysia

=== Records ===
Prior to this competition, the existing Asian and SEA Games records were as follows:

AR	Li Xuemei (CHN)	22.01	Shanghai, China	22 October 1997
GR	Kristina Knott (PHI)	23.01	New Clark City, Philippines	7 December 2019

=== Results ===
Heat 1

Rank	Athlete	Time	Notes
1	Shanti Pereira (SGP)	24.03	Q
2	Nur Afrina Batrisyia (MAS)	24.30	Q
3	Athicha Phetkun (THA)	24.40	Q
4	Tran Thi Nhi Yen (VIE)	25.73	Q
5	Sang Lida (CAM)	25.73	

Heat 2

Rank	Athlete	Time	Notes
1	Zaidatul Husniah Zulkifli (MAS)	23.98	Q
2	Kristina Knott (PHI)	24.06	Q
3	Elizabeth-Ann Tan Shee Ru (SGP)	24.12	Q
4	Kha Thanh Trúc (VIE)	24.15	Q
5	On-Uma Chattha (THA)	25.50	
6	Duong Sreypheap (CAM)	25.96	

Finals

Rank	Athlete	Time	Notes
1st place, gold medalist(s)	Shanti Pereira (SGP)	22.69	GR, NR
2nd place, silver medalist(s)	Trần Thị Nhi Yến (VIE)	23.54	
3rd place, bronze medalist(s)	Zaidatul Husniah Zulkifli (MAS)	23.60	
4	Kristina Knott (PHI)	23.79	
5	Elizabeth-Ann Shee Ru Tan (SGP)	24.03	
6	Nur Afrina Batrisyia (MAS)	24.09	
7	Thanh Truc Kha (VIE)	24.48	
—	Athicha Phetkun (THA)		DQ

== 400 metre ==
Athletics – Women's 400 metre at the 2023 SEA Games
- Venue: Morodok Techo National Stadium
- Date: 9 May 2023
- Competitors: 9 from 5 nations

Medalists
gold medal	Shereen Samson Vallabouy	Malaysia
silver medal	Nguyễn Thị Huyền	Vietnam
bronze medal	Nguyễn Thị Hằng	Vietnam

=== Records ===
Prior to this competition, the existing Asian and SEA Games records were as follows:

AR	Salwa Eid Naser (BHR)	48.14	Doha, Qatar	3 October 2019
GR	Nguyễn Thị Tĩnh (VIE)	51.83	Hanoi, Vietnam	8 December 2003

=== Results ===
Rank	Athlete	Time	Notes
1st place, gold medalist(s)	Shereen Samson Vallabouy (MAS)	52.53	
2nd place, silver medalist(s)	Nguyễn Thị Huyền (VIE)	53.27	
3rd place, bronze medalist(s)	Nguyễn Thị Hằng (VIE)	53.84	
4	Maureen Emily Ong Schrijvers (PHI)	54.69	
5	Jessel Dialino Lumapas (PHI)	56.41	
6	Benny Nontanam (THA)	57.54	
7	Thipphanet Meechan (THA)	57.76	
—	Ben Seyha (CAM)	—	DNS
—	Chelsea Cassiopea Evali Bopulas (MAS)	—	DNS

== 800 metre ==
Athletics – Women's 800 metre at the 2023 SEA Games
- Venue: Morodok Techo National Stadium
- Date: 11 May 2023
- Competitors: 11 from 7 nations

Medalists
gold medal	Nguyễn Thị Thu Hà	Vietnam
silver medal	Bui Thị Ngan	Vietnam
bronze medal	Goh Chui Ling	Singapore

=== Records ===
Prior to this competition, the existing Asian and SEA Games records were as follows:

AR	Liu Dong (CHN)	1:55.54	Beijing, China	9 September 1993
GR	Trương Thanh Hằng (VIE)	2:02.39	Nakhon Ratchasima, Thailand	8 December 2007

=== Results ===
Rank	Athlete	Time	Notes
1st place, gold medalist(s)	Nguyễn Thị Thu Hà (VIE)	2:08.55	
2nd place, silver medalist(s)	Bui Thị Ngan (VIE)	2:08.96	
3rd place, bronze medalist(s)	Goh Chui Ling (SGP)	2:09.15	
4	Bernalyn Bejoy (PHI)	2:09.20	
5	Mutiara Oktarani Nurul Al Pasha (INA)	2:14.35	
6	Savinder Kaur (MAS)	2:15.77	
7	Hizillawanty Jamain (MAS)	2:16.92	
8	Ruedee Netthai (THA)	2:18.25	
9	Pattarawan Chanpoltho (THA)	2:20.96	
10	Kan Sreyroth (CAM)	2:24.46	
—	Marisolervera Amarga (PHI)	—	DNS

== 1500 metre ==
Athletics – Women's 1500 metre at the 2023 SEA Games
- Venue: Morodok Techo National Stadium
- Date: 9 May 2023
- Competitors: 10 from 8 nations

Medalists
gold medal	Nguyễn Thị Oanh	Vietnam
silver medal	Bui Thị Ngan	Vietnam
bronze medal	Goh Chui Ling	Singapore

=== Records ===
Prior to this competition, the existing Asian and SEA Games records were as follows:

AR	Qu Yunxia (CHN)	3:50.46	Beijing, China	11 September 1993
GR	Trương Thanh Hằng (VIE)	4:11.60	Nakhon Ratchasima, Thailand	7 December 2007

=== Results ===
Rank	Athlete	Time	Notes
1st place, gold medalist(s)	Nguyễn Thị Oanh (VIE)	4:16.85	
2nd place, silver medalist(s)	Bui Thị Ngan (VIE)	4:24.57	
3rd place, bronze medalist(s)	Goh Chui Ling (SGP)	4:26.33	NR
4	Savinder Kaur (MAS)	4:29.10	
5	Lodkeo Inthakumman (LAO)	4:35.16	
6	Mutiara Oktarani Nurul Al Pasha (INA)	4:38.64	
7	Ângela Freitas De Fátima Araújo (TLS)	4:41.41	
8	Geetha Sivaraja (MAS)	5:00.090	
9	Pattarawan Chanpoltho (THA)	5:06.15	
—	Bou Samnang (CAM)	—	DNS

== 5000 metre ==
Athletics – Women's 5000 metre at the 2023 SEA Games
- Venue: Morodok Techo National Stadium
- Date: 8 May 2023
- Competitors: 11 from 8 nations

Medalists
gold medal	Nguyễn Thị Oanh	Vietnam
silver medal	Phạm Thị Hồng Lệ	Vietnam
bronze medal	Odekta Elvina Naibaho	Indonesia

=== Records ===
Prior to this competition, the existing Asian and SEA Games records were as follows:

AR	Jiang Bo (CHN)	14:28.09	Shanghai, China	23 October 1997
GR	Triyaningsih (INA)	15:54.32	Nakhon Ratchasima, Thailand	8 December 2007

=== Results ===
Rank	Athlete	Time	Notes
1st place, gold medalist(s)	Nguyễn Thị Oanh (VIE)	17:00.33	
2nd place, silver medalist(s)	Phạm Thị Hồng Lệ (VIE)	17:06.72	
3rd place, bronze medalist(s)	Odekta Elvina Naibaho (INA)	17:13.63	
4	Joida Gadot Gagnao (PHI)	17:22.48	
5	Lodkeo Inthakumman (LAO)	17:36.05	NR
6	Vanessa Ying Zhuang Lee (SGP)	18:02.52	
7	Ângela Freitas De Fátima Araújo (TLS)	18:35.80	
8	Abegail Andres Manzano (PHI)	18:41.76	
9	Khin Mar Se (MYA)	18:55.37	
10	Run Romdul (CAM)	21:27.08	
11	Bou Samnang (CAM)	22:54.22	

== 10000 metre ==
Athletics – Women's 10000 metre at the 2023 SEA Games
- Venue: Morodok Techo National Stadium
- Date: 12 May 2023
- Competitors: 12 from 8 nations

Medalists
gold medal	Nguyễn Thị Oanh	Vietnam
silver medal	Phạm Thị Hồng Lệ	Vietnam
bronze medal	Odekta Elvina Naibaho	Indonesia

=== Records ===
Prior to this competition, the existing Asian and SEA Games records were as follows:

AR	Wang Junxia (CHN)	29:31.78	Beijing, China	8 September 1993
GR	Triyaningsih (INA)	32:49.47	Vientiane, Laos	17 December 2009

=== Results ===
Rank	Athlete	Time	Notes
1st place, gold medalist(s)	Nguyễn Thị Oanh (VIE)	35:11.53	
2nd place, silver medalist(s)	Phạm Thị Hồng Lệ (VIE)	35:21.09	
3rd place, bronze medalist(s)	Odekta Elvina Naibaho (INA)	35:31.03	
4	Than Aye Aye (MYA)	36:02.54	
5	Christine Organiza Hallasgo (PHI)	36:41.08	
6	Lodkeo Inthakumman (LAO)	37:29.58	
7	Vanessa Ying Zhuang Lee (SGP)	37:46.21	
8	Ângela Freitas De Fátima Araújo (TLS)	38:11.04	
9	Joida Gadot Gagnao (PHI)	38:27.63	
10	Toh Ting Xuan (SGP)	39:20.64	
11	Khin Mar Se (MYA)	39:28.59	
12	Ling Rachna (CAM)	41:11.57	

== 100 metre hurdles ==
Athletics – Women's 100 metre hurdles at the 2023 SEA Games
- Venue: Morodok Techo National Stadium
- Date: 10 May 2023
- Competitors: 10 from 7 nations

Medalists
gold medal	Huỳnh Thị Mỹ Tiên	Vietnam
silver medal	Bùi Thị Nguyên	Vietnam
bronze medal	Dina Aulia	Indonesia

=== Records ===
Prior to this competition, the existing Asian and SEA Games records were as follows:

AR	Olga Shishigina (KAZ)	12.44	Lucerne, Switzerland	27 June 1995
GR	Trecia Roberts (THA)	12.85	Bandar Seri Begawan, Brunei	9 August 1999

=== Results ===
Heat 1

Rank	Athlete	Time	Notes
1	Huỳnh Thị Mỹ Tiên (VIE)	13.50	Q
2	Emilia Nova (INA)	13.87	Q
3	Jelly Paragile (PHI)	13.92	Q
4	Farah Syakira Azif Safarin (MAS)	14.90	Q
—	Khanmalaiphone Bounyaveun (LAO)		DQ

Heat 2

Rank	Athlete	Time	Notes
1	Bùi Thị Nguyên (VIE)	13.46	Q
2	Dina Aulia (INA)	13.51	Q
3	Natchaya Chaopakpang (THA)	14.23	Q
4	Melissa Escoton (PHI)	14.35	Q
—	Beh Seyha (CAM)		DNS

Finals

Rank	Athlete	Time	Notes
1st place, gold medalist(s)	Huỳnh Thị Mỹ Tiên (VIE)	13.50	
2nd place, silver medalist(s)	Bùi Thị Nguyên (VIE)	13.52	
3rd place, bronze medalist(s)	Dina Aulia (INA)	13.59	
4	Emilia Nova (INA)	13.96	
5	Jelly Paragile (PHI)	14.01	
6	Natchaya Chaopakpang (THA)	14.23	
7	Melissa Escoton (PHI)	14.33	
8	Farah Syakira Azif Safarin (MAS)	14.79	

== 400 metre hurdles ==
Athletics – Women's 400 metre hurdles at the 2023 SEA Games
- Venue: Morodok Techo National Stadium
- Date: 11 May 2023
- Competitors: 7 from 5 nations

Medalists
gold medal	Nguyễn Thị Huyền	Vietnam
silver medal	Robyn Lauren Brown	Philippines
bronze medal	Nguyễn Thị Ngọc	Vietnam

=== Records ===
Prior to this competition, the existing Asian and SEA Games records were as follows:

AR	Han Qing (CHN)	53.96	Beijing, China	9 September 1993
AR	Song Yinglan (CHN)	53.96	Guangzhou, China	22 November 2001
GR	Nguyễn Thị Huyền (VIE)	56.06	Kuala Lumpur, Malaysia	22 August 2017

=== Results ===
Rank	Athlete	Time	Notes
1st place, gold medalist(s)	Nguyễn Thị Huyền (VIE)	56.29	
2nd place, silver medalist(s)	Robyn Lauren Brown (PHI)	56.15	
3rd place, bronze medalist(s)	Nguyễn Thị Ngọc (VIE)	59.09	
4	Mandy Goh Li (MAS)	1:00.70	
5	Arisa Weruwanarak (THA)	1:04.50	
6	Natchaya Chaopakpang (THA)	1:08.44	
7	Khanmalaiphone Bounyaveun (LAO)	1:09.76	

== 3000 metre steeplechase ==
Athletics – Women's 3000 metre steeplechase at the 2023 SEA Games
- Venue: Morodok Techo National Stadium
- Date: 9 May 2023
- Competitors: 4 from 2 nations

Medalists
gold medal	Nguyễn Thị Oanh	Vietnam
silver medal	Joida Gadot Gagnao	Philippines
bronze medal	Nguyễn Thị Huong	Vietnam

=== Records ===
Prior to this competition, the existing Asian and SEA Games records were as follows:

AR	Ruth Jebet (BHR)	8:52.78	Saint-Denis, France	27 August 2016
GR	Nguyễn Thị Oanh (VIE)	9:52.46	Hanoi, Vietnam	15 May 2022

=== Results ===
Rank	Athlete	Time	Notes
1st place, gold medalist(s)	Nguyễn Thị Oanh (VIE)	10:34.37	
2nd place, silver medalist(s)	Joida Gadot Gagnao (PHI)	10:40.96	
3rd place, bronze medalist(s)	Nguyễn Thị Huong (VIE)	11:00.85	
4	Abegail Andres Manzano (PHI)	11:19.16	

== 4 x 100 metre relay ==
Athletics – Women's 4 x 100 metre relay at the 2023 SEA Games
- Venue: Morodok Techo National Stadium
- Date: 10 May 2023
- Competitors: 24 from 6 nations

Medalists
gold medal	Jirapat Khanonta; Sukanda Petraksa; Athicha Phetkun; Manatsada Sanmano	Thailand
silver medal	Hoàng Dư Ý Huỳnh Thị Mỹ Tiên; Kha Thanh Trúc; Lê Tú Chinh	Vietnam
bronze medal	Azreen Nabila Alias; Nur Afrina Batrisyia; Nur Aishah Rofina Aling; Zaidatul Husniah Zulkifli	Malaysia

=== Records ===
Prior to this competition, the existing Asian and SEA Games records were as follows:

AR	China; Xiao Lin, Li Yali, Liu Xiaomei, Li Xuemei	42.23	Shanghai, China	23 October 1997
GR	Vietnam; Le Thị Mộng Tuyền, Đỗ Thị Quyên, Trần Thị Yến Hoa, Lê Tú Chinh	43.88	Kuala Lumpur, Malaysia	25 August 2017

=== Results ===
Rank	Athlete	Time	Notes
1st place, gold medalist(s)	Thailand; Jirapat Khanonta, Sukanda Petraksa, Athicha Phetkun, Manatsada Sanmano	44.24	
2nd place, silver medalist(s)	Vietnam; Hoàng Dư Ý, Huỳnh Thị Mỹ Tiên, Kha Thanh Trúc, Lê Tú Chinh	44.51	
3rd place, bronze medalist(s)	Malaysia; Azreen Nabila Alias, Nur Afrina Batrisyia, Nur Aishah Rofina Aling, Zaidatul Husniah Zulkifli	44.58	NR
4	Singapore; Bernice Yee Ling Liew, Clara Si Hui Goh, Elizabeth-Ann Shee Ru Tan, Nur Izlyn Binte Zaini	45.16	
5	Philippines; Jessel Dialino Lumapas, Kayla Maico Richardson, Kristina Knott, Kyla Ashley Maico Richardson	45.17	
6	Cambodia; Ben Seyha, Duong Sreypheap, Kan Sreyroth, Pok Pisey	49.50	

== 4 x 400 metre relay ==
Athletics – Women's 4 x 400 metre relay at the 2023 SEA Games
- Venue: Morodok Techo National Stadium
- Date: 12 May 2023
- Competitors: 16 from 4 nations

Medalists
gold medal	Hoàng Thị Minh Hạnh; Nguyễn Thị Hằng; Nguyễn Thị Huyền; Nguyễn Thị Ngọc	Vietnam
silver medal	Bernalyn Bejoy; Robyn Lauren Brown; Jessel Lumapas; Maureen Schrijvers	Philippines
bronze medal	Sukanya Janchaona; Benny Nontanam; Sasipim Satachot; Arisa Weruwanarak	Thailand

=== Records ===
Prior to this competition, the existing Asian and SEA Games records were as follows:

AR	China; An Xiaohong, Bai Xiaoyun, Cao Chunying, Ma Yuqin	3:24.28	Beijing, China	13 September 1993
GR	Vietnam; Nguyễn Thị Oanh, Nguyễn Thị Thúy, Quách Thị Lan, Nguyễn Thị Huyền	3:31.46	Kallang, Singapore	11 June 2015

=== Results ===
Rank	Athlete	Time	Notes
1st place, gold medalist(s)	Vietnam; Hoàng Thị Minh Hạnh, Nguyễn Thị Hằng, Nguyễn Thị Huyền, Nguyễn Thị Ngọc	3:33.05	
2nd place, silver medalist(s)	Philippines; Bernalyn Bejoy, Robyn Lauren Brown, Jessel Lumapas, Maureen Schrijvers	3:37.75	NR
3rd place, bronze medalist(s)	Thailand; Sukanya Janchaona, Benny Nontanam, Sasipim Satachot, Arisa Weruwanarak	3:39.29	
4	Malaysia; Chelsea Cassiopea Evali Bopulas, Mandy Goh Li, Nurul Aliah Maisarah Nor Azmi, Shereen Samson Vallabouy	3:39.89	

== Marathon ==
Athletics – Women's Marathon at the 2023 SEA Games
- Venue: Angkor Wat
- Date: 6 May 2023
- Competitors: 9 from 7 nations

Medalists
gold medal	Odekta Elvina Naibaho	Indonesia
silver medal	Lê Thị Thuyết	Vietnam
bronze medal	Christine Organiza Hallasgo	Philippines

=== Records ===
Prior to this competition, the existing Asian and SEA Games records were as follows:

AR	Mao Ichiyama (JPN)	2:20:29	Aichi, Japan	8 March 2020
GR	Ruwiyati (INA)	2:34:29	Chiang Mai, Thailand	13 December 1995

=== Results ===
Rank	Athlete	Time
1st place, gold medalist(s)	Odekta Elvina Naibaho (INA)	2:48:14
2nd place, silver medalist(s)	Lê Thị Thuyết (VIE)	2:49:21
3rd place, bronze medalist(s)	Christine Organiza Hallasgo (PHI)	2:50:27
4	Linda Janthachit (THA)	2:58:11
5	Myint Myint Aye (MYA)	3:11:52
6	Aoranuch Aiamtas (THA)	3:17:36
7	Fang Yu Sharon Tan (SGP)	3:32.58
8	Thi Ninh Nguyen (VIE)	3:46:44
9	Eng Muy Ngim (CAM)	4:00:17

== 20 kilometres race walk ==
Athletics – Women's 20 kilometres race walk at the 2023 SEA Games
- Venue: Angkor Wat
- Date: 6 May 2023
- Competitors: 6 from 4 nations

Medalists
gold medal	Nguyễn Thị Thanh Phúc	Vietnam
silver medal	Violine Intan Puspita	Indonesia
bronze medal	Kotchaphon Tangsrivong	Thailand

=== Records ===
Prior to this competition, the existing Asian and SEA Games records were as follows:

AR	Violah Jepchumba (BHR)	1:01:50	Prague, Czech Republic	1 April 2017
GR	Nguyễn Thị Thanh Phúc (VIE)	1:37.08	Naypyidaw, Myanmar	15 December 2013

=== Results ===
Rank	Athlete	Time
1st place, gold medalist(s)	Nguyễn Thị Thanh Phúc (VIE)	1:55:02
2nd place, silver medalist(s)	Violine Intan Puspita (INA)	1:55:14
3rd place, bronze medalist(s)	Kotchaphon Tangsrivong (THA)	1:57:11
4	Zin May Htet (MYA)	2:01:35
5	Than Than Soe (MYA)	2:10:29
6	Thi Van Nguyen (VIE)	2:15:22

== High jump ==
Athletics – Women's high jump at the 2023 SEA Games
- Venue: Morodok Techo National Stadium
- Date: 6 May 2023
- Competitors: 7 from 5 nations

Medalists
gold medal	Thanlada Thongchomphunut	Thailand
silver medal	Phạm Thị Diễm	Vietnam
bronze medal	Michelle Sng Suat Li	Singapore

=== Records ===
Prior to this competition, the existing Asian and SEA Games records were as follows:

AR	Nadezhda Dubovitskaya (KAZ)	2.00 m	Almaty, Kazakhstan	8 June 2021
GR	Noeng-ruthai Chaipech (THA)	1.94 m	Vientiane, Laos	14 December 2009

=== Results ===
Rank	Athlete	1.50	1.55	1.60	1.65	1.69	1.73	1.77	1.79	Height	Notes
1st place, gold medalist(s)	Thanlada Thongchomphunut (THA)		o	o	o	o	o	xxo	xxo	1.79	
2nd place, silver medalist(s)	Phạm Thị Diễm (VIE)				o	xo	o	xxo	xxx	1.77	
3rd place, bronze medalist(s)	Michelle Sng Suat Li (SGP)			o	o	o	xo	xxx		1.73	
4	Nguyen Thanh Vy (VIE)				o	o	xxx			1.69	
5	Yap Sean Yee (MAS)		o	o	o	o	xxx			1.69	
—	Sun Soklim (CAM)			xxx						NM	
—	Ngu Jia Xin (MAS)									DNS	

== Pole vault ==
Athletics – Women's pole vault at the 2023 SEA Games
- Venue: Morodok Techo National Stadium
- Date: 10 May 2023
- Competitors: 8 from 5 nations

Medalists
gold medal	Chonthicha Khabut	Thailand
silver medal	Nor Sarah Adi	Malaysia
bronze medal	Natalie Uy	Philippines

=== Records ===
Prior to this competition, the existing Asian and SEA Games records were as follows:

AR	Li Ling (CHN)	4.72 m	Shanghai, China	18 May 2019
GR	Natalie Uy (PHI)	4.25 m	New Clark City, Philippines	8 December 2019

=== Results ===
Rank	Athlete	3.80	3.85	3.90	3.95	4.00	4.05	4.10	Height	Notes
1st place, gold medalist(s)	Chonthicha Khabut (THA)		o		o	o	o	xxx	4.05	
2nd place, silver medalist(s)	Nor Sarah Adi (MAS)	o	xo	xo		o	o	xxx	4.05	
3rd place, bronze medalist(s)	Natalie Uy (PHI)	o	o	o		o	xx	x	4.00	
4	Diva Renatta Jayadi (INA)	xo		o		o	xxx		4.00	
5	Chayanisa Chomchuendee (THA)		o		xxo		xxx		3.95	
6	Maria Andriani Melabessy (INA)								3.45	
—	Alyana Martinez (PHI)								NH	
—	Rachel Isabel Bingjie Yang (SGP)								NH	

== Long jump ==
Athletics – Women's long jump at the 2023 SEA Games
- Venue: Morodok Techo National Stadium
- Date: 10 May 2023
- Competitors: 8 from 6 nations

Medalists
gold medal	Maria Natalia Londa	Indonesia
silver medal	Bùi Thị Thu Thảo	Vietnam
bronze medal	Bùi Thị Loan	Vietnam

=== Records ===
Prior to this competition, the existing Asian and SEA Games records were as follows:

AR	Yao Weili (CHN)	7.01 m	Jinan, China	5 June 1993
GR	Marestella Torres (PHI)	6.71 m	Palembang, Indonesia	12 November 2011

=== Results ===
Rank	Athlete	Round						Mark
Rank	Athlete	1	2	3	4	5	6	Mark
1st place, gold medalist(s)	Maria Natalia Londa (INA)	x	6.06	6.20	x	6.28	6.14	6.28
2nd place, silver medalist(s)	Bùi Thị Thu Thảo (VIE)	x	x	x	6.13	6.08	x	6.13
3rd place, bronze medalist(s)	Bùi Thị Loan (VIE)	5.96	x	6.00	5.80	6.00	6.02	6.02
4	Parinya Chuaimaroeng (THA)	6.00	x	5.92	5.87	x	5.93	6.00
5	Supawat Choothong (THA)	x	5.78	5.78	x	x	x	5.78
6	Nurul Ashikin Abas (MAS)	5.49	5.47	5.23	5.52	5.67	x	5.67
7	Silina Pha Aphay (LAO)	5.17	5.13	5.08	5.17	4.78	4.85	5.17
8	Pok Pisey (CAM)	4.76	4.66	4.67	4.43	—	—	4.76

== Triple jump ==
Athletics – Women's triple jump at the 2023 SEA Games
- Venue: Morodok Techo National Stadium
- Date: 8 May 2023
- Competitors: 5 from 4 nations

Medalists
gold medal	Parinya Chuaimaroeng	Thailand
silver medal	Maria Natalia Londa	Indonesia
bronze medal	Nguyễn Thị Hương	Vietnam

=== Records ===
Prior to this competition, the existing Asian and SEA Games records were as follows:

AR	Olga Rypakova (KAZ)	15.25 m	Stadion Poljud, Croatia	4 September 2010
GR	Maria Natalia Londa (INA)	14.17 m	Naypyidaw, Myanmar	17 December 2013

=== Results ===
Rank	Athlete	Round						Mark
Rank	Athlete	1	2	3	4	5	6	Mark
1st place, gold medalist(s)	Parinya Chuaimaroeng (THA)	x	x	13.08	13.21	13.60	13.05	13.60
2nd place, silver medalist(s)	Maria Natalia Londa (INA)	13.28	13.42	x	13.50	13.03	x	13.50
3rd place, bronze medalist(s)	Nguyễn Thị Hương (VIE)	x	13.21	13.22	x	13.11	13.46	13.46
4	Nurul Ashikin Abas (MAS)	x	13.32	x	13.16	12.37	x	13.23
5	Supawat Choothong (THA)	x	12.75	12.52	x	12.53	11.95	12.75

== Shot put ==
Athletics – Women's shot put at the 2023 SEA Games
- Venue: Morodok Techo National Stadium
- Date: 11 May 2023
- Competitors: 10 from 6 nations

Medalists
gold medal	Areerat Intadis	Thailand
silver medal	Eki Febri Ekawati	Indonesia
bronze medal	Nani Sahirah Maryata	Malaysia

=== Records ===
Prior to this competition, the existing Asian and SEA Games records were as follows:

AR	Li Meisu (CHN)	21.76 m	Shijiazhuang, China	23 April 1988
GR	Du Xianhui (SGP)	18.20 m	Hanoi, Vietnam	7 December 2003

=== Results ===
Rank	Athlete	Round						Mark
Rank	Athlete	1	2	3	4	5	6	Mark
1st place, gold medalist(s)	Areerat Intadis (THA)	15.52	14.88	15.04	16.71	15.13	14.97	16.71
2nd place, silver medalist(s)	Eki Febri Ekawati (INA)	14.22	15.11	15.24	x	x	x	15.24
3rd place, bronze medalist(s)	Nani Sahirah Maryata (MAS)	14.37	13.47	12.44	14.44	x	13.95	14.44
4	Nurul Ainin Syauqina Nor Azahar (MAS)	11.91	x	12.56	12.45	12.16	12.50	12.56
5	Jamela Poderoso De Asis (PHI)	x	12.03	x	x	12.22	12.46	12.46
6	Subenrat Insaeng (THA)	11.34	12.06	12.12	R	R	R	12.12
7	Aira Buan Teodosio (PHI)	10.93	x	11.80	x	11.04	10.62	11.80
8	Wai Teng Melissa Yee (SGP)	11.56	10.72	10.96	x	10.60	11.69	11.69
9	Phon Sovannara (CAM)	11.37	10.17	10.79	Did not advance			11.37
10	Neang Monika (CAM)	11.33	11.18	10.98	Did not advance			11.33

== Discus throw ==
Athletics – Women's discus throw at the 2023 SEA Games
- Venue: Morodok Techo National Stadium
- Date: 10 May 2023
- Competitors: 6 from 4 nations

Medalists
gold medal	Subenrat Insaeng	Thailand
silver medal	Queenie Ting	Malaysia
bronze medal	Lê Thị Cẩm Dung	Vietnam

=== Records ===
Prior to this competition, the existing Asian and SEA Games records were as follows:

AR	Xiao Yanling (CHN)	71.68 m	Beijing, China	14 March 1992
GR	Subenrat Insaeng (THA)	60.33 m	New Clark City, Philippines	9 December 2019

=== Results ===
Rank	Athlete	Round						Mark
Rank	Athlete	1	2	3	4	5	6	Mark
1st place, gold medalist(s)	Subenrat Insaeng (THA)	x	57.69	x	54.67	x	x	57.69
2nd place, silver medalist(s)	Queenie Ting (MAS)	49.19	50.05	50.73	x	x	x	50.73
3rd place, bronze medalist(s)	Lê Thị Cẩm Dung (VIE)	42.27	45.08	42.92	45.01	44.16	42.32	45.08
4	Nur Atiqah Sufiah Hanizam (MAS)	44.39	43.84	41.58	44.02	41.96	44.34	44.39
5	Phon Sovannara (CAM)	x	x	29.29	29.75	x	0.00	29.75
6	Areerat Intadis (THA)	24.18	0.00	0.00	0.00	0.00	0.00	24.18

== Hammer throw ==
Athletics – Women's hammer throw at the 2023 SEA Games
- Venue: Morodok Techo National Stadium
- Date: 8 May 2023
- Competitors: 5 from 4 nations

Medalists
gold medal	Grace Wong	Malaysia
silver medal	Mingkamon Koomphon	Thailand
bronze medal	Nurul Hidayah Lukman	Malaysia

=== Records ===
Prior to this competition, the existing Asian and SEA Games records were as follows:

AR	Wang Zheng (CHN)	77.68 m	Chengdu, China	29 March 2014
GR	Grace Wong (MAS)	59.24 m	Hanoi, Vietnam	18 May 2022

=== Results ===
Rank	Athlete	Round						Mark
Rank	Athlete	1	2	3	4	5	6	Mark
1st place, gold medalist(s)	Grace Wong (MAS)	56.08	55.40	59.17	61.87	x	60.88	61.87 GR
2nd place, silver medalist(s)	Mingkamon Koomphon (THA)	57.62	x	x	57.86	x	x	57.86
3rd place, bronze medalist(s)	Nurul Hidayah Lukman (MAS)	49.61	x	45.03	x	x	x	49.61
4	Panwat Gimsrang (THA)	x	x	49.05	48.54	x	x	49.05
5	Aira Buan Teodosio (PHI)	x	45.65	46.21	x	x	40.34	46.21

== Javelin throw ==
Athletics – Women's javelin throw at the 2023 SEA Games
- Venue: Morodok Techo National Stadium
- Date: 12 May 2023
- Competitors: 6 from 3 nations

Medalists
gold medal	Jariya Wichaidit	Thailand
silver medal	Gennah Malapit	Philippines
bronze medal	Evalyn Palabrica	Philippines

=== Records ===
Prior to this competition, the existing Asian and SEA Games records were as follows:

AR	Lü Huihui (CHN)	67.98 m	Shenyang, China	2 August 2019
GR	Lò Thị Hoàng (VIE)	59.24 m	Kuala Lumpur, Malaysia	24 August 2017

=== Results ===
Rank	Athlete	Round						Mark
Rank	Athlete	1	2	3	4	5	6	Mark
1st place, gold medalist(s)	Jariya Wichaidit (THA)	45.53	49.93	x	x	x	52.60	52.60
2nd place, silver medalist(s)	Gennah Malapit (PHI)	x	49.55	45.73	45.69	47.44	38.06	49.55
3rd place, bronze medalist(s)	Evalyn Palabrica (PHI)	x	48.31	46.90	x	46.59	x	48.31
4	Ng Jing Xuan (MAS)	37.52	42.46	44.58	41.90	42.16	44.22	44.58
5	Supisara Ngerndist (THA)	x	41.73	43.28	x	x	42.94	43.28
6	Pavithraa Devi Jayaindran (MAS)	42.07	42.54	43.16	41.58	40.41	x	43.16

== Heptathlon ==
Athletics – Women's heptathlon at the 2023 SEA Games
- Venue: Morodok Techo National Stadium
- Date: 10–11 May 2023
- Competitors: 6 from 4 nations

Medalists
gold medal	Nguyễn Linh Na	Vietnam
silver medal	Sarah Dequinan	Philippines
bronze medal	Sunisa Khotseemueang	Thailand

=== Records ===
Prior to this competition, the existing Asian and SEA Games records were as follows:

AR	Ghada Shouaa (SYR)	6942 pts	Götzis, Austria	25–26 May 1996
GR	Wassana Winatho (THA)	5889 pts	Nakhon Ratchasima, Thailand	11 December 2007

=== Results ===
Key

The highest mark recorded in each event is highlighted in yellow

Rank	Athlete	200m	800m	Shot put	High jump	Long jump	100m hurdles	Javeline throw	Total points
1st place, gold medalist(s)	Nguyễn Linh Na (VIE)	863; 25.26	698; 2:29.60	615; 11.30	806; 1.66	843; 5.98	899; 14.57	679; 40.59	5403
2nd place, silver medalist(s)	Sarah Dequinan (PHI)	788; 26.15	694; 2:29.89	567; 10.57	879; 1.72	771; 5.74	872; 14.77	798; 46.80	5369
3rd place, bronze medalist(s)	Sunisa Khotseemueang (THA)	784; 26.15	663; 2:32.39	643; 11.73	842; 1.69	747; 5.66	874; 14.76	700; 41.72	5253
4	Hoang Thanh Giang (VIE)	872; 25.16	791; 2:22.44	400; 8.01	771; 1.63	843; 5.98	910; 14.49	576; 35.23	5163
5	Norliyana Kamaruddin (MAS)	725; 26.84	602; 2:37.46	568; 10.59	991; 1.81	663; 5.37	808; 15.26	489; 30.67	4846
6	Winnie Eng May Xin (MAS)	0 DNS	0 DNS	0 R	0 DNS	0 DNS	746; 15.74	0; 0.00	746

== See also ==
- Athletics at the 2023 SEA Games – Men's Results
- Athletics at the 2023 SEA Games – Mixed 4 × 400 m relay
