= Shaun Goh =

Singaporean runner (born 1997)

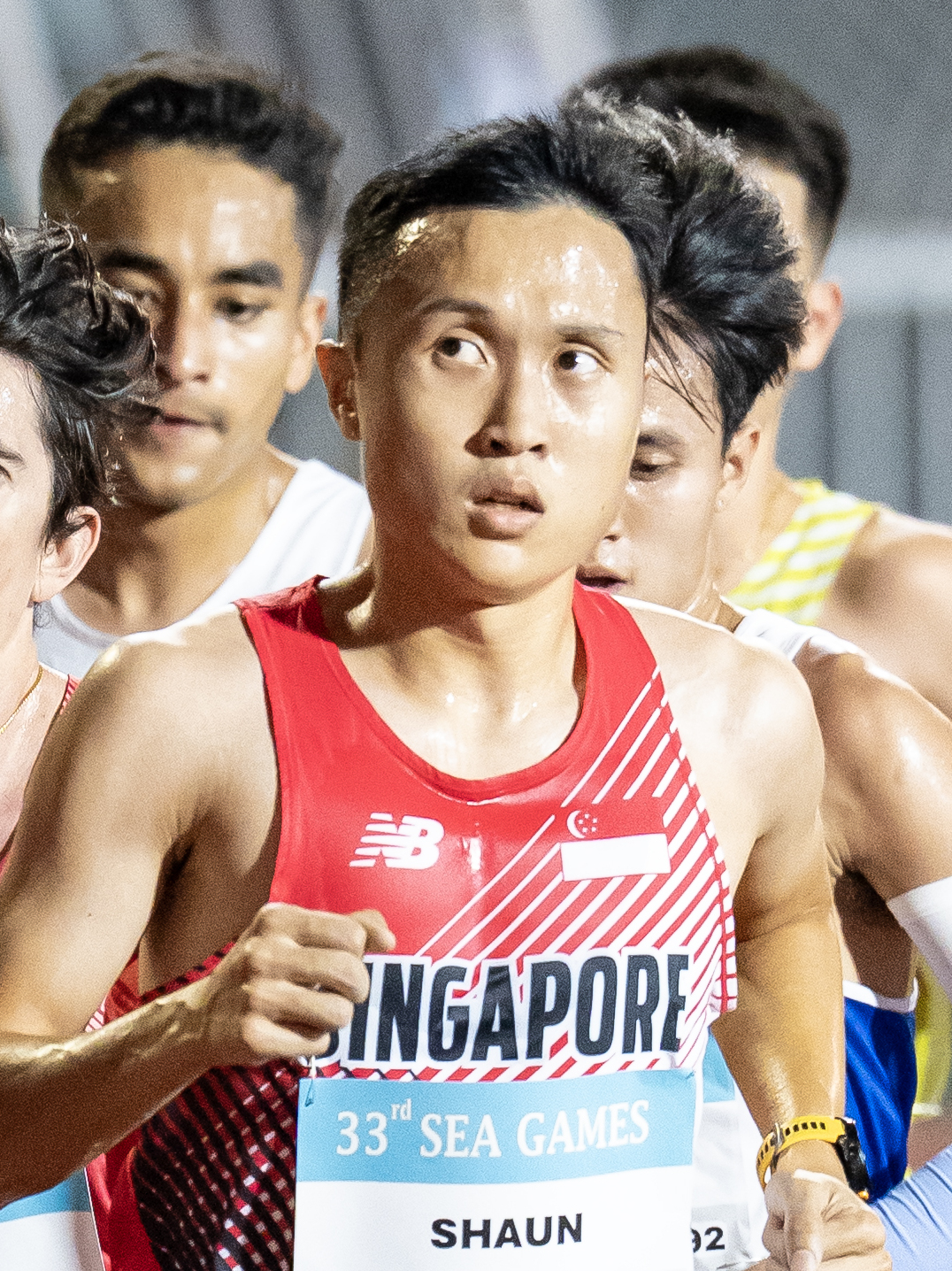
- Goh at the 2025 SEA Games

Personal information
- Born: 12 January 1997 (age 29) Singapore

Sport
- Country: Singapore
- Sport: Athletics
- Events: 1500m, 5,000m, 10,000m, Half-Marathon

Achievements and titles
- Personal bests: Outdoors; 1500 m: 3:57.50 (2026); 2.4 km: 6:47.01 (2026, NR); 3000 m: 8:39.81 (2025); 5000 m: 14:45.29 (2026); 10,000 m: 30:27.83 (2026); Road; Mile: 4:18.6 (2026, NR); 5 km: 14:47 (2026, NR); 10 km: 30:16 (2026, NR); Half marathon: 1:05:01 (2026, NR)

Shaun Goh (born 12 January 1997) is a middle- and long-distance runner from Singapore. He currently holds the Singapore national records in the road mile (4:18.6), 2.4 km (6:47.01), 5 km road race (14:47), 10 km road race (30:16) and the half marathon (1:05:01).

Goh represented Singapore at the 2023 SEA Games and 2025 SEA Games, competing in the 10,000 m at both editions and also the 5000 m at the latter.

== National records ==
=== First national record ===
Goh set his first Singapore national record on 22 September 2024, running 31:00 for the 10 km road race at the Run Prix in Melbourne, Australia, improving the previous record held by Soh Rui Yong by 37 seconds. On 5 July 2025, he set the national record in the 5 km road race at the Gold Coast Airport 5km in Australia, finishing fifth in 14:49.

=== 10,000 metres national record ===
On 9 August 2025, Goh set his first national record on the track, running 31:02.40 in the 10,000 m at the Queensland 10,000m Championships in Brisbane, Australia. The performance surpassed Soh's previous national record of 31:10.70.[6] The record was subsequently broken by Soh, who ran 30:33.29 at the Nittaidai Challenge Games in Tokyo on 29 November 2025.

=== Multiple national records in 2026 ===
In 2026, Goh set national records across multiple distances.

On 13 June 2026, he set a national record in the road mile, running 4:18.6 at the BigSeries Big Mile in Utrecht, Netherlands.

On 4 July, he lowered his own 10 km road record to 30:41 at the Southern Cross University 10km on the Gold Coast, Australia.

On 15 August, Goh ran 6:47.01 at the Pocari Sweat 2.4 km National Championships, breaking the previous national record of 6:50.31 held by Jeevaneesh Soundararajah and becoming the first Singaporean to run under 6 minutes 50 seconds for 2.4km. Nepal's Subas Gurung finished 0.008 seconds ahead of Goh in 6:47.002, with the pair becoming the first two runners to break the 6:50 barrier at the event.

On 19 September, he lowered his own 5 km road record to 14:47 at the World Athletics Road Running Championships in Copenhagen, where he finished 49th in the men's 5km.

Eight days later, on 27 September, Goh lowered his 10 km road national record for the second time that year, running 30:16 at the Vitality London 10,000. The performance improved his previous mark by 25 seconds.

On 25 October, Goh broke the half marathon national record at 1:04:59 (chip time) at the Valencia Half Marathon, toppling Soh Rui Yong's half marathon record set at the same race 3 years ago by almost 2 minutes. He also became the first Singaporean to break the 65 minute half marathon mark. His official gun time is 1:05:01.

On 7 November, Goh ran 30:27.83 at the 26th Nittaidai Challenge Games, breaking the previous national record of 30:33.29 held by Soh, becoming the first Singaporean to run under 30:30 for the 10,000m event.
