= Mok Ying Ren =

Singaporean triathlete and distance runner

Adj Asst Prof Mok Ying Ren
- Education: MBBS, NUS (2012); MMed Ortho; FRCSEd (Orth) (2022) MSpMed, University of Queensland (2016); Fellowship at Rizzoli Ortho Institute, Bologna, Italy (2025)
- Occupations: Orthopaedic Sports Surgeon, Academic
- Employer(s): National University Hospital, Singapore
- Known for: ACL reconstruction (over-the-top technique), meniscus repair, cartilage surgery, knee preservation surgery; first Singaporean to win SEA Games gold medals in two different sports
- Website: https://www.nuh.com.sg/care-at-nuh/find-a-doctor/doctor-details/Mok_Ying_Ren

Mok Ying Ren
Personal information
- Born: 6 July 1988 (age 38) Singapore
- Height: 1.72 m (5 ft 7 1/2 in)
- Weight: 60 kg (130 lb)
- Spouse: Belinda Ooi (m. 2017)
- Children: Emma Mok, Caleb Mok, Micaiah Mok
- Website: http://mokyingren.sg

Sport
- Country: Singapore
- Club: Team Singapore
- Coached by: Self Coached

Achievements and titles
- Personal bests: 5000 m: 14:51; 10,000 m: 31:55; Half marathon: 1:07:08; Marathon: 2:26:07
Medal record
Representing Singapore
Men's triathlon
Southeast Asian Games
Gold medal – first place	2007 Thailand	Olympic distance
Men's athletics
Southeast Asian Games
Gold medal – first place	2013 Myanmar	Marathon

Dr. Mok Ying Ren (born 6 July 1988) is a Singaporean orthopaedic surgeon, former competitive triathlete, and long-distance runner. He is a Consultant in Sports Surgery at the National University Hospital (NUH), Singapore, and an Adjunct Assistant Professor at the NUS Yong Loo Lin School of Medicine, specialising in knee sports surgery including anterior cruciate ligament (ACL) reconstruction, meniscus repair, and knee preservation surgery. As an athlete, his best performances include a gold medal in the triathlon at the 2007 SEA Games, and another in the marathon at the 2013 SEA Games, making him the first and thus far only Singaporean to win SEA Games gold medals in two different sports. He held the national record in the 5000 m event from May 2011 to July 2021.

== Career ==
=== Medical career ===
He is currently a Consultant in the Division of Sports Surgery at the National University Hospital (NUH), Singapore.

Mok completed an international subspecialty fellowship at the Rizzoli Orthopaedic Institute in Bologna, Italy; which is one of the top Orthopedic Institutions in the world, ranking in the top 10 in the world every year since 2022. He was trained under Professor Stefano Zaffagnini, a leading authority in ACL reconstruction and knee ligament surgery. He was also mentored by Dr Alberto Grassi, one of the highest volume paediatric ACL reconstruction surgeon in the world. During this fellowship, he trained specifically in the over-the-top ACL reconstruction technique, a physeal-sparing and anatomically distinct approach developed at the Rizzoli Institute and has been in use since 1993.

Mok's research interests include the anatomy, epidemiology, reconstruction techniques, management of complications, outcomes, lateral extra-articular tenodesis, graft selection, over-the-top reconstruction, and magnetic resonance assessment of the ACL. He is an author of several textbook chapters on knee dislocation.

=== Athletics ===
Mok is a 7-time Singapore Marathon Local Champion, capturing every title from 2009 to 2016 with the exception of a 3rd-place finish in 2012. Mok first won the 2009 Singapore Marathon with a time of 2:43:42 on his debut marathon. At the 2010 Singapore Marathon, his second marathon, he broke his own course record for the local category with a time of 2:38:27. Mok once again won the 2011 Singapore Marathon Local Category with a time of 2:46:01 despite battling a bad case of plantar fasciitis. In 2016, he clocked 1hr 7min 8 sec at the Rock 'n' Roll Arizona Half Marathon to set a new National best time for the half marathon.

Mok ran a new Singaporean men's 5000 m national record of 14:51:09 at the Tokai University Time Trials in Japan in May 2011. The record was broken by Soh Rui Yong in July 2021.

== Early life and education ==
Mok Ying Ren was born on 6 July 1988 in Singapore. His father was an engineer with Housing and Development Board, and his mother was a housewife. Additionally, he has a younger sister, 6 years younger, Mok Ying Rong. He studied at Red Swastika Primary School, Raffles Institution, and then Raffles Junior College. He graduated from the National University Singapore Yong Loo Lin School of Medicine in 2012. He also completed Masters in Sports Medicine with the University of Queensland in 2016.

== Personal life ==
Mok married Belinda Ooi on 30 December 2017, after having dated for four years. They have a daughter and two sons.
