= Athletics at the 1994 Commonwealth Games – Women's marathon =

Women's marathon at the Commonwealth Games

The women's marathon event at the 1994 Commonwealth Games was held in Victoria, British Columbia

== Results ==
Rank	Name	Nationality	Time	Notes
1st place, gold medalist(s)	Carole Rouillard	Canada	2:30:41	
2nd place, silver medalist(s)	Lizanne Bussières	Canada	2:31:07	
3rd place, bronze medalist(s)	Yvonne Danson	England	2:32:24	
4	Karen MacLeod	Scotland	2:33:16	
5	Nyla Carroll	New Zealand	2:34:03	
6	Angelina Kanana	Kenya	2:35:02	
7	Hayley Nash	Wales	2:35:39	
8	Sally Ellis	England	2:37:14	
9	Carol Galea	Malta	2:39:40	
10	Kerryn McCann	Australia	2:40:10	
11	Danuta Bartoszek	Canada	2:40:44	
12	Lynn Harding	Scotland	2:40:57	
13	Sally Eastall	England	2:41:32	
14	Pauline Vea	Tonga	2:56:59	
15	Tani Ruckle	Australia	3:06:27	
	Susan Hobson	Australia	DNF	
