= Athletics at the 2023 SEA Games – Mixed 4 × 400 m relay =

Athletics – Mixed 4 x 400 metre relay at the 2023 SEA Games
- Venue: Morodok Techo National Stadium
- Date: 8 May 2023
- Competitors: 16 from 4 nations

Medalists
gold medal	Quách Công Lịch; Trần Đình Sơn; Trần Nhật Hoàng; Hoàng Thị Ánh Thục; Nguyễn Thị Hằng; Nguyễn Thị Huyền	Vietnam
silver medal	Chitdara Phretewek; Joseph Onuora; Patcharaporn Jongkaijak; Phattaraporn Dechanon; Sarawut Nuansi; Thipphanet Meechan	Thailand
bronze medal	Frederick Ramirez; Joyme Sequita; Michael Del Prado; Umajesty Williams	Philippines

The mixed 4 × 400 m relay competition at the 2023 SEA Games in Cambodia took place on 8 May 2023, at the Morodok Techo National Stadium in Phnom Penh.

Four teams of four athletes each took part of the competition.

== Records ==
Prior to this competition, the existing Asian and SEA Games records were as follows:

AR	Bahrain; Musa Isah, Aminat Yusuf Jamal, Salwa Eid Naser, Abbas Abubakar Abbas	3:11.82	Doha, Qatar	29 September 2019
GR	Thailand; Siripol Punpa, Supanich Poolkerd, Joshua Atkinson, Benny Nontanam	3:19.29	Hanoi, Vietnam	14 May 2022

== Results ==
Rank	Athlete	Time	Notes
1st place, gold medalist(s)	Vietnam; Quách Công Lịch, Trần Đình Sơn, Trần Nhật Hoàng, Hoàng Thị Ánh Thục, Nguyễn Thị Hằng, Nguyễn Thị Huyền	3:21.27	
2nd place, silver medalist(s)	Thailand; Chitdara Phretewek, Joseph Onuora, Patcharaporn Jongkaijak, Phattaraporn Dechanon, Sarawut Nuansi, Thipphanet Meechan	3:23.02	
3rd place, bronze medalist(s)	Philippines; Frederick Ramirez, Joyme Sequita, Michael Del Prado, Umajesty Williams	3:23.69	
4	Malaysia; Umar Osman, Abdul Wafiy Roslan, Muhammad Firdaus Musa, Chelsea Cassiopea Evali Bopulas, Mandy Goh Li, Zaimah Atifah Zainuddin	3:31.25	

== See also ==
- Athletics at the 2023 SEA Games – Men's Results
- Athletics at the 2023 SEA Games – Women's Results
