= Reuben Rainer Lee =

Singaporean sprinter (born 2002)

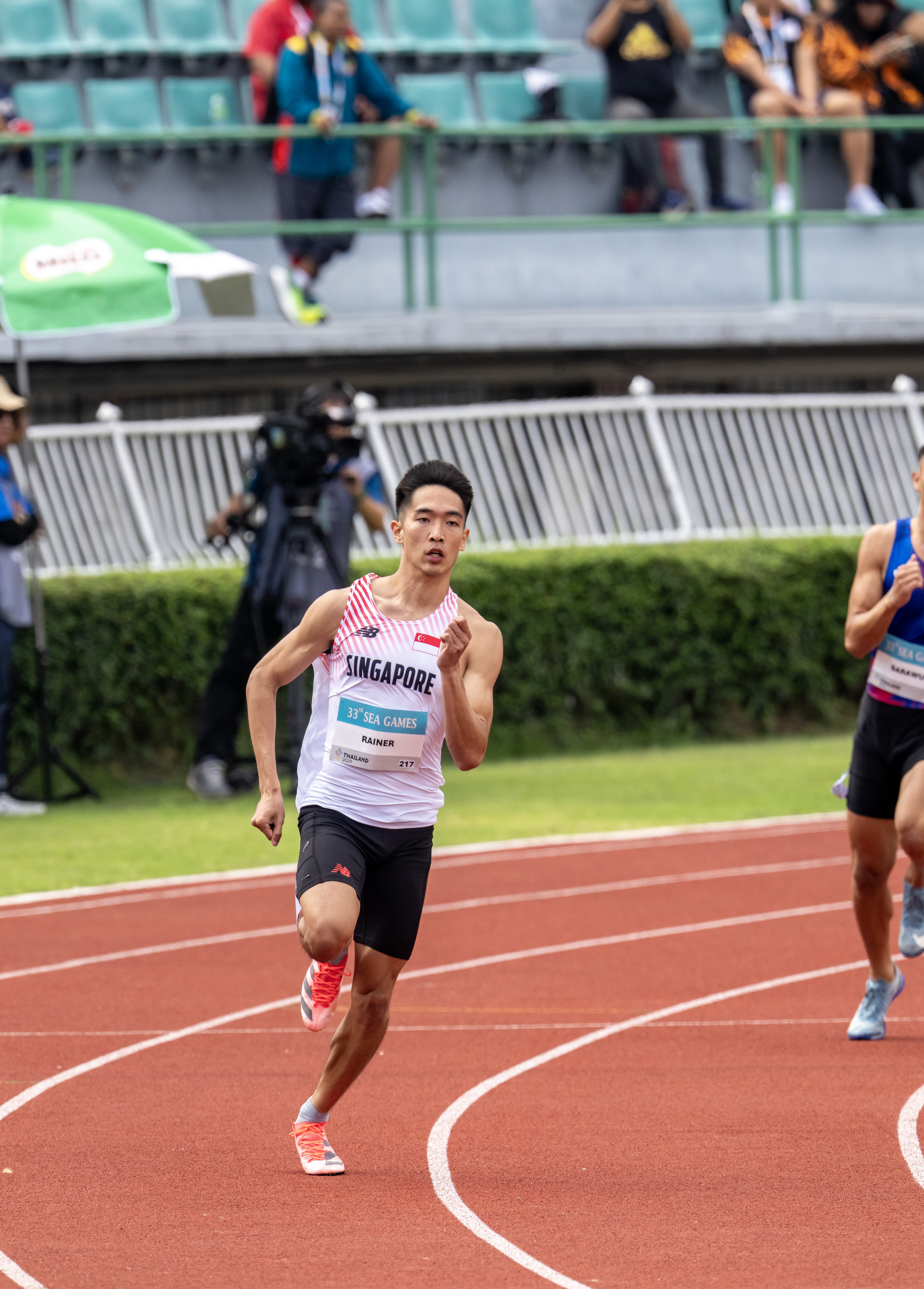
- Lee at the 2025 SEA Games

Personal information
- Full name: Reuben Rainer Lee Siong En
- Born: 17 September 2002 (age 24) Singapore

Sport
- Country: Singapore
- Sport: Athletics
- Events: 200m, 400m
Medal record
Men's Athletics
Representing Singapore
Southeast Asian Games
Silver medal – second place	2021 Vietnam	4 × 400 metres relay
Bronze medal – third place	2025 Thailand	4 x 400 metres relay

Reuben Rainer Lee Siong En (born 17 September 2002) is a sprinter from Singapore. He had represented Singapore in the 200m and 4 x 400m events and won a bronze in the 4 x 400m at the 2025 SEA Games.

== Career ==
During the 2021 SEA Games held at Vietnam, Lee broke broke the national record for the 200m with a time of 21.07s and also won a silver in the 4 × 400 m relay.

During the 2025 SEA Games held at Thailand, Muncherji won the bronze medal in the 4x400m relay with teammates Zubin Muncherji, Thiruben Thana Rajan, and Calvin Quek, clocking 3 minutes 10.74 seconds.
