= International Stadium =

International Stadium may refer to:

- Amman International Stadium, Jordan
- International Stadium Yokohama, now Nissan Stadium, Japan
- Jakarta International Stadium, Indonesia
- Rotorua International Stadium, New Zealand
