= Vanessa Lee (athlete) =

Singaporean distance runner

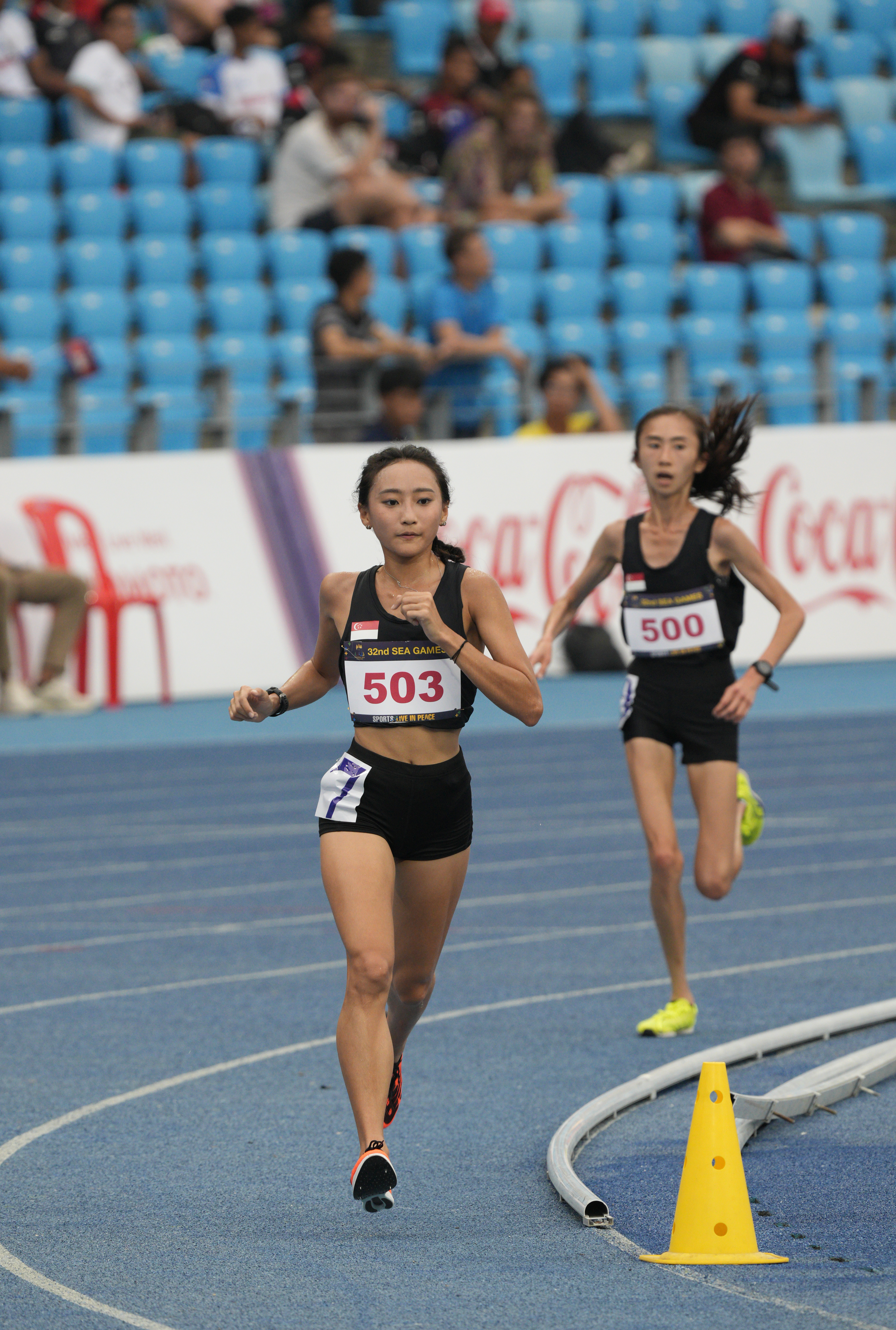
- Lee competing in Phnom Penh during the 2023 SEA Games

Personal information
- Born: 23 February 1998 (age 28) Singapore

Sport
- Country: Singapore
- Sport: Athletics
- Events: 3000 m steeplechase, 5000 m, 10,000 m

Vanessa Lee Ying Zhuang (Chinese: 李瑛粧; pinyin: Lǐ Yīngzhuāng; born 23 February 1998) is a Singapore distance runner who has competed in the SEA Games. She holds the national records for the mile (5:10.86), 3000 metres steeplechase (11:04.18), 5000 metres (17:06.69), 5km road (16:57), 10,000 metres (36:15.67), 10km road (35:55),and half marathon (1:16.04). In 2021, Lee set the national record for 2.4km (7:59.69) before it was broken by Goh Chui Ling's 7:58.50 effort the following year.

Lee studied at Victoria Junior College. When she was a university student, Lee won multiple titles and held records at the Institute-Varsity-Polytechnic Track and Field Championships.
