= Calvin Quek =

Singaporean sprinter

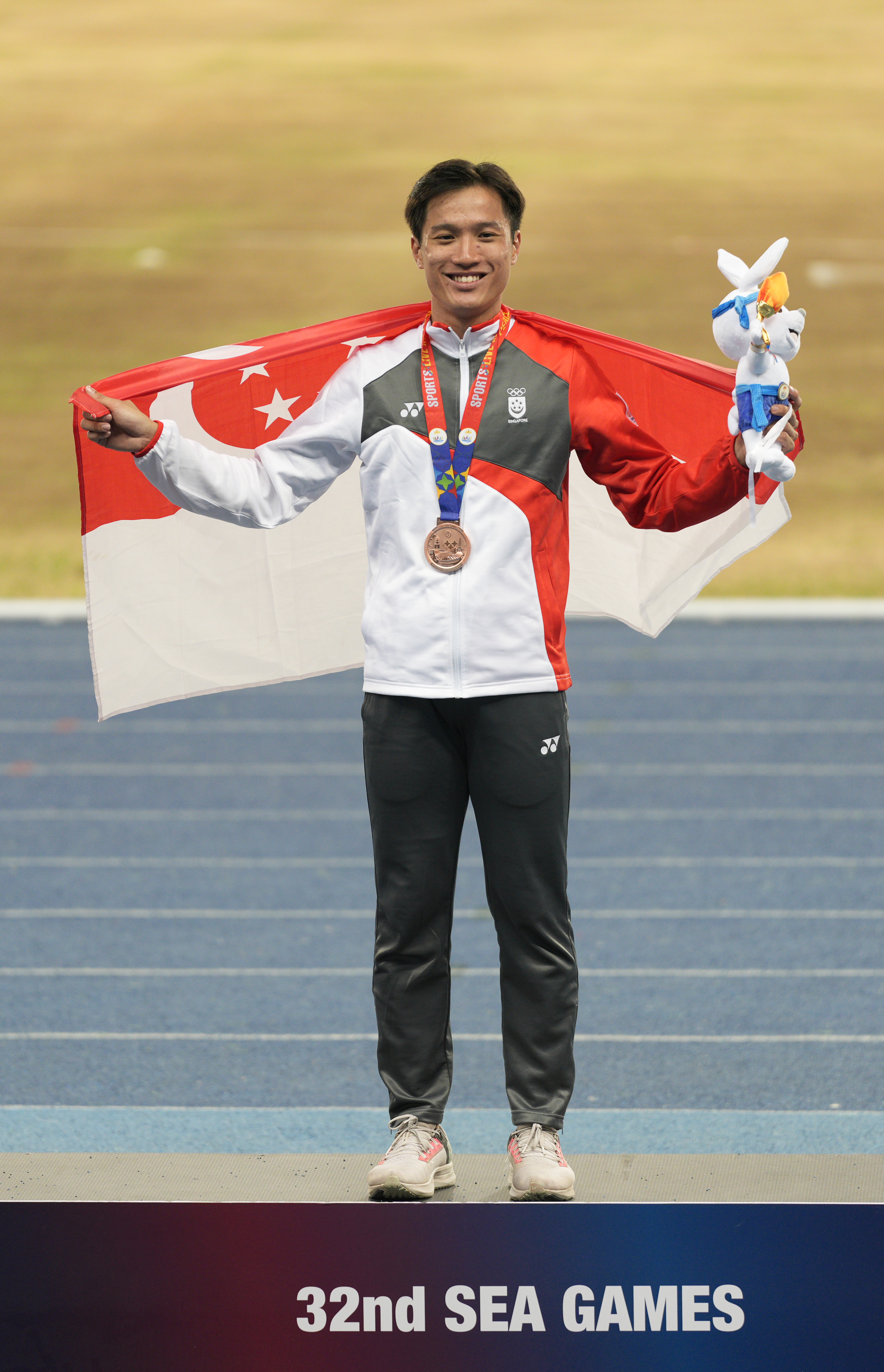
- Quek with his bronze medal at the 2023 SEA Games

Personal information
- Born: 26 February 1996 (age 30) Singapore

Sport
- Country: Singapore
- Sport: Athletics
- Event: 400 metres hurdles
Medal record
Men's Athletics
Representing Singapore
Southeast Asian Games
Gold medal – first place	2025 Thailand	400m hurdles
Silver medal – second place	2021 Vietnam	4 x 400 metres relay
Bronze medal – third place	2021 Vietnam	400m hurdles
Bronze medal – third place	2023 Cambodia	400m hurdles
Bronze medal – third place	2025 Thailand	4 x 400 metres relay

Calvin Quek Jun Jie (born 26 February 1996) is a Singapore sprinter who specialises in the 400 m and 400 m hurdles.

== Career ==
As a schoolboy, Quek was a perennial medallist at National Schools in both events. He first broke the 400m hurdles national record in February 2022 with a time of 51.73s at a Southeast Asian Games Trial. Subsequently, at the SEA Games in Hanoi, he rewrote his national record with a time of 51.19s and became the first Singaporean to win a SEA Games medal in the event since 1969. That year, he also competed in the 2022 Commonwealth Games and 2022 Asian Games.

At the 2023 SEA Games in Phnom Penh, Quek ran 50.75s to secure a bronze again. At the same competition, he was part of the 4 × 400 m quartet that broke the national record with 3 minutes 10.11 seconds. In the World University Games, he ran 50.43s to rewrite his 400m hurdles national record.

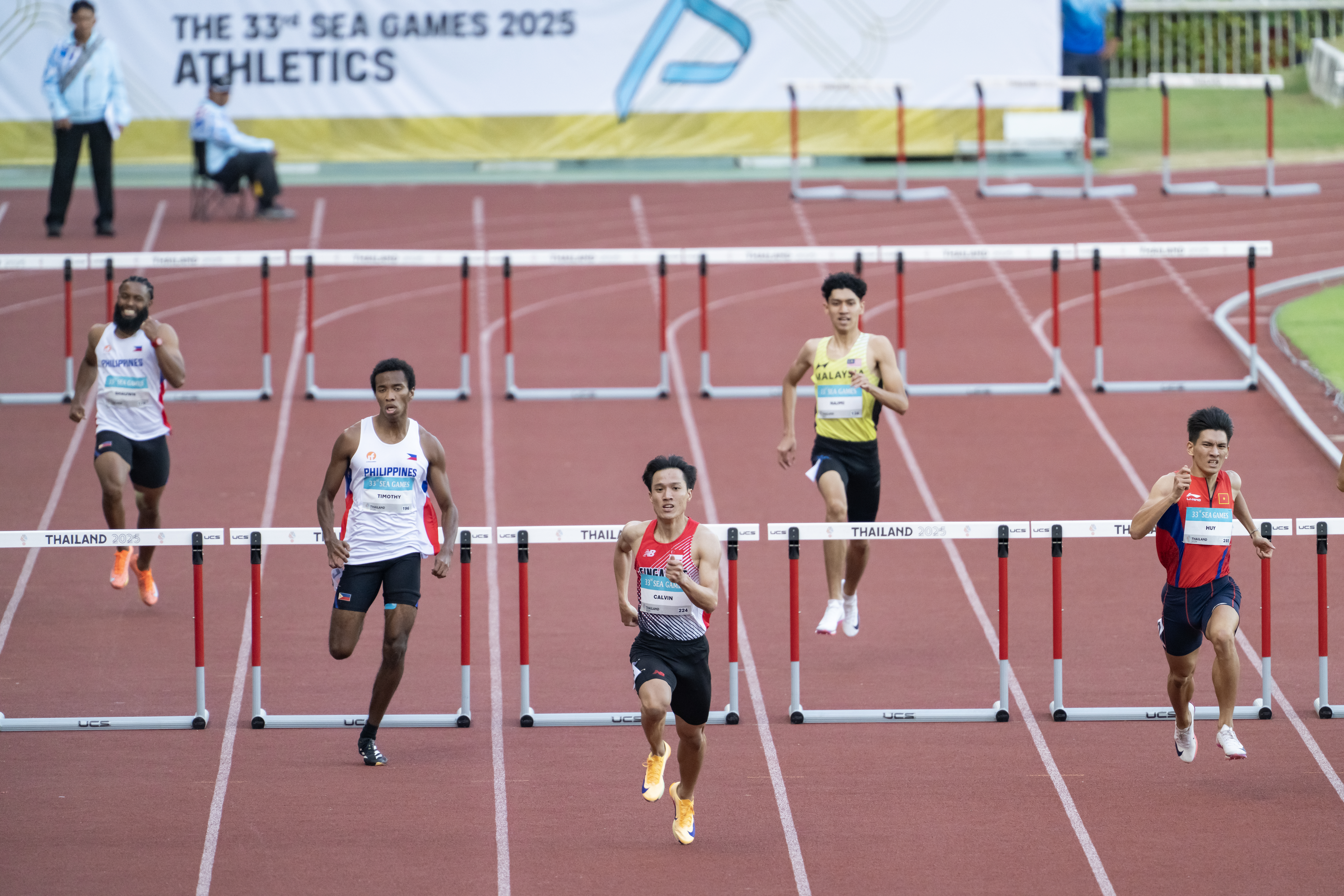
Quek en route to his gold in the 2025 SEA Games

In August 2025, Quek rewrote his 400m hurdles record twice: first in Kyoto (50.24s), and subsequently in Yokohama (49.75s). At the 2025 SEA Games in Bangkok, he won Singapore's first gold in the event in 60 years with a time of 50.27s. In the 4 × 400 m, Quek began the last leg in fourth place and the team — also comprising Reuben Rainer Lee, Thiruben Thana Rajan, and Zubin Percy Muncherji— won the bronze with a time of 3 minutes 10.74 seconds.
