= Thiruben Thana Rajan =

Singaporean runner (born 2000)

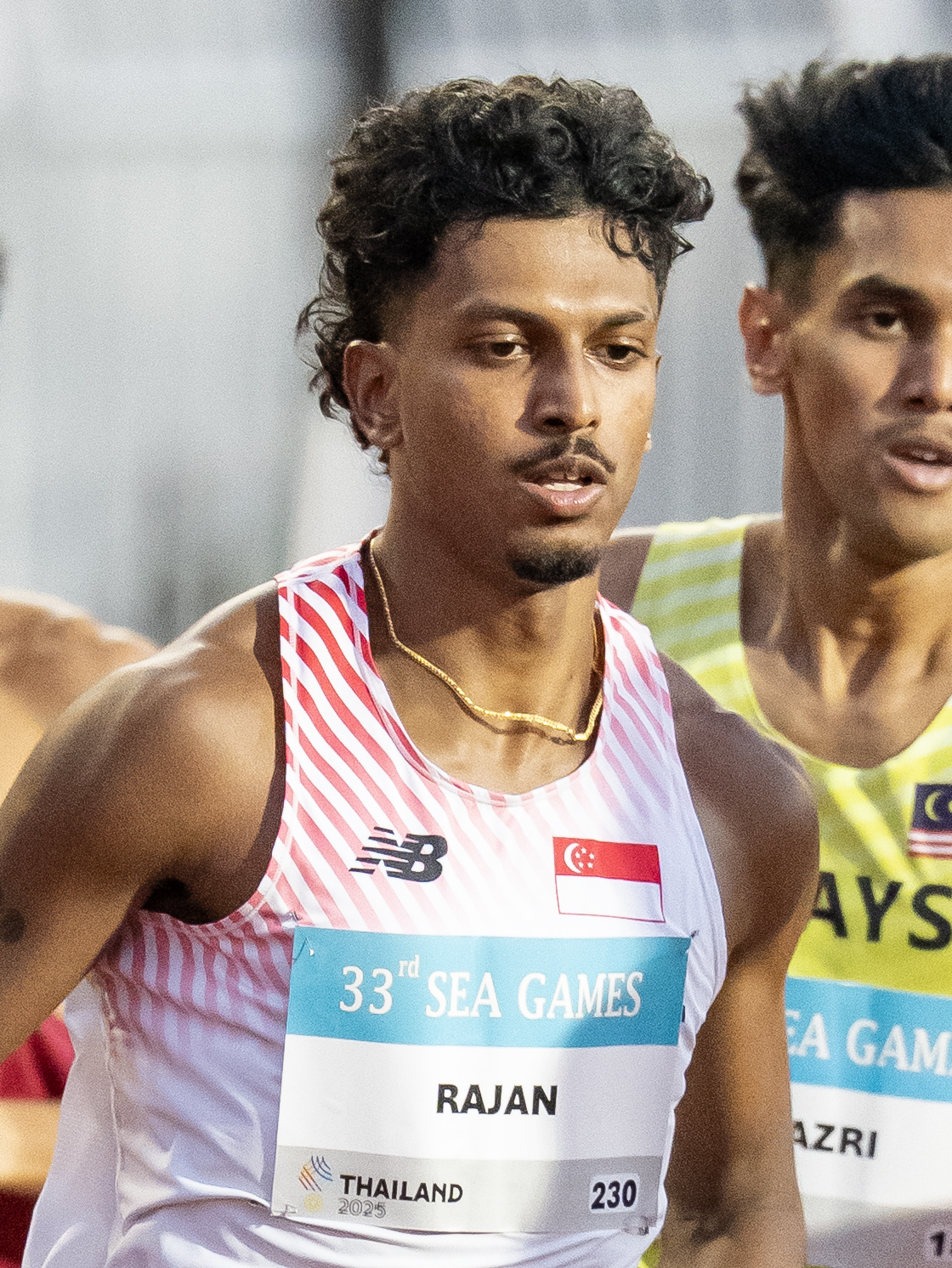
- Thiruben at the 2025 Southeast Asian Games

Personal information
- Born: 28 October 2000 (age 26) Singapore

Sport
- Country: Singapore
- Sport: Athletics
- Events: 400 m, 800 m
Medal record
Men's Athletics
Representing Singapore
Southeast Asian Games
| Silver medal – second place | 2021 Vietnam | 4 × 400 metres relay |
| Bronze medal – third place | 2025 Thailand | 4 x 400 metres relay |

Thiruben Thana Rajan (born 28 October 2000) is a runner from Singapore. He has represented Singapore in various Southeast Asian Games, and holds the national record for the 800 m (1:49.94).

== Running career ==
Thiruben started racing competitively when he was 14; in only his third 400 m race, he ran 48.77s to break the record at the Singapore Under-18 and Under-20 Athletics Championships. The same year at the World U-18 Championship, he lowered his record to 47.91s.

At the 2023 SEA Games in Cambodia, Thiruben, together with Calvin Quek, Zubin Muncherji, and Ng Chin Hui broke the Singapore national record for the 4 x 400 metres. At the 2025 SEA Games in Thailand, Thiruben, together with Quek, Muncherji, and Reuben Rainer Lee won the broze in the same event.
