= Jeevaneesh Soundararajah =

Singaporean athlete, long-distance runner, SEA Games participant

- Jeevaneesh competing in 2022

Personal information
- Born: 5 July 1993 (age 33) Singapore

Sport
- Country: Singapore
- Sport: Athletics
- Events: 1500 metres, 5000 metres

Jeevaneesh Soundararajah (born 5 July 1993) is a Singaporean long-distance athlete who specializes in events ranging from 1500m to 10,000m. He represented Singapore in the men's 5000 metres at the 2015 SEA Games and 1500 metres at the 2021 SEA Games.

As a schoolboy, he won the 1500 metres and cross-country events at the "A" Division National School Games, and was the first person to go below 15 minutes for the latter.

On 8 January 2022, he won the Pocari Sweat 2.4 km challenge with a national mark of 6:52.97; he lowered this mark by 2 seconds in the second edition of the race seven months later. In April he won the bronze in the 1500 metres at the Singapore Open with a time of 4:00.99.

== Athletic career ==
=== Southeast Asian Games ===
2015 SEA Games (Singapore):

- Competed in the Men's 5000m, finishing in eighth place with a time of 16:14.75

2021 SEA Games (Hanoi, Vietnam):

- Represented Singapore in the 1500m

2023 SEA Games (Cambodia):

- Competed in the 5000m, finishing in fifteenth place with a timing of 15:51.63

=== World Athletics Cross Country Championship ===
- Represented Singapore at the World Athletics Cross Country 2023 in Bathurst, Australia

=== 2.4km National Record ===
On January 8, 2022, at the Pocari Sweat Run at the Home of Athletics, Jeevaneesh set a new Singapore national record for 2.4 km with a time of 6:52.97, breaking the previous record of 6:53.18 set by Soh Rui Yong. He lowered this mark by 2 seconds in the second edition of the race seven months later.

Singapore Open (2022):

- Won the bronze medal in the 1500m with a time of 4:00.99.
