= Tia Rozario =

Singapore female athlete

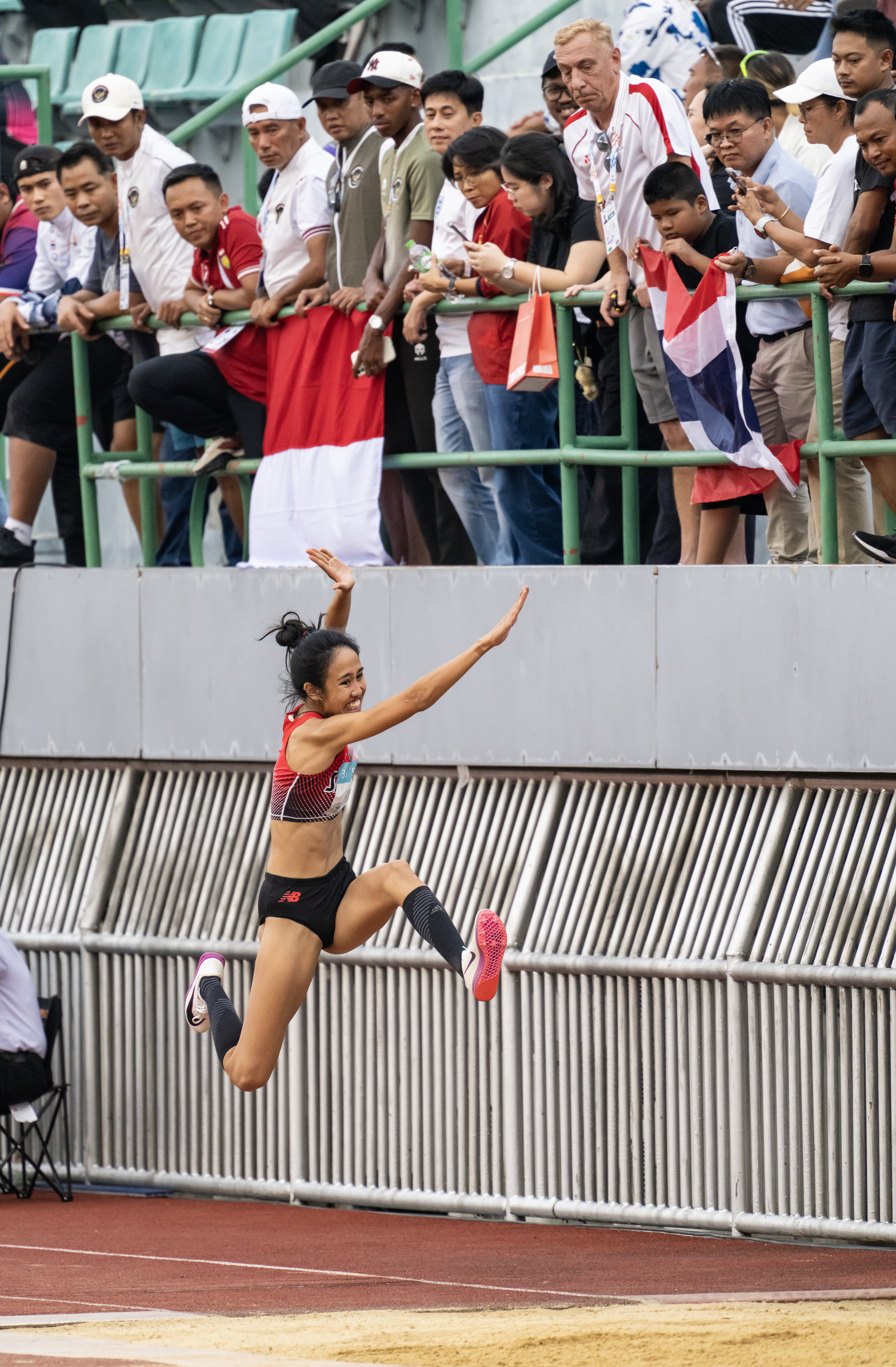
- Rozario at the 2025 Southeast Asian Games

Personal information
- Full name: Tia Louise Rozario
- Born: 14 October 2000 (age 26)

Tia Louise Rozario (born 14 October 2000) is a Singaporean athlete specialising in long jump and triple jump. Rozario holds the national records for indoor long jump (5.82m), indoor triple jump (12.81m), and triple jump (12.92m).

== Education ==
Rozario studied at Princeton University for her undergraduate degree in neuroscience and is pursuing a master's in biomedical science at Duke University.

== Sporting career ==
When Rozario was younger, she competed as a hurdler. Subsequently, she represented Singapore Sports School and won the A Division long jump; before that, she also won the event for four consecutive years.

In 2016, she represented Singapore at the 12th Southeast Asian Youth Athletics.
