= Zubin Muncherji =

Singaporean sprinter

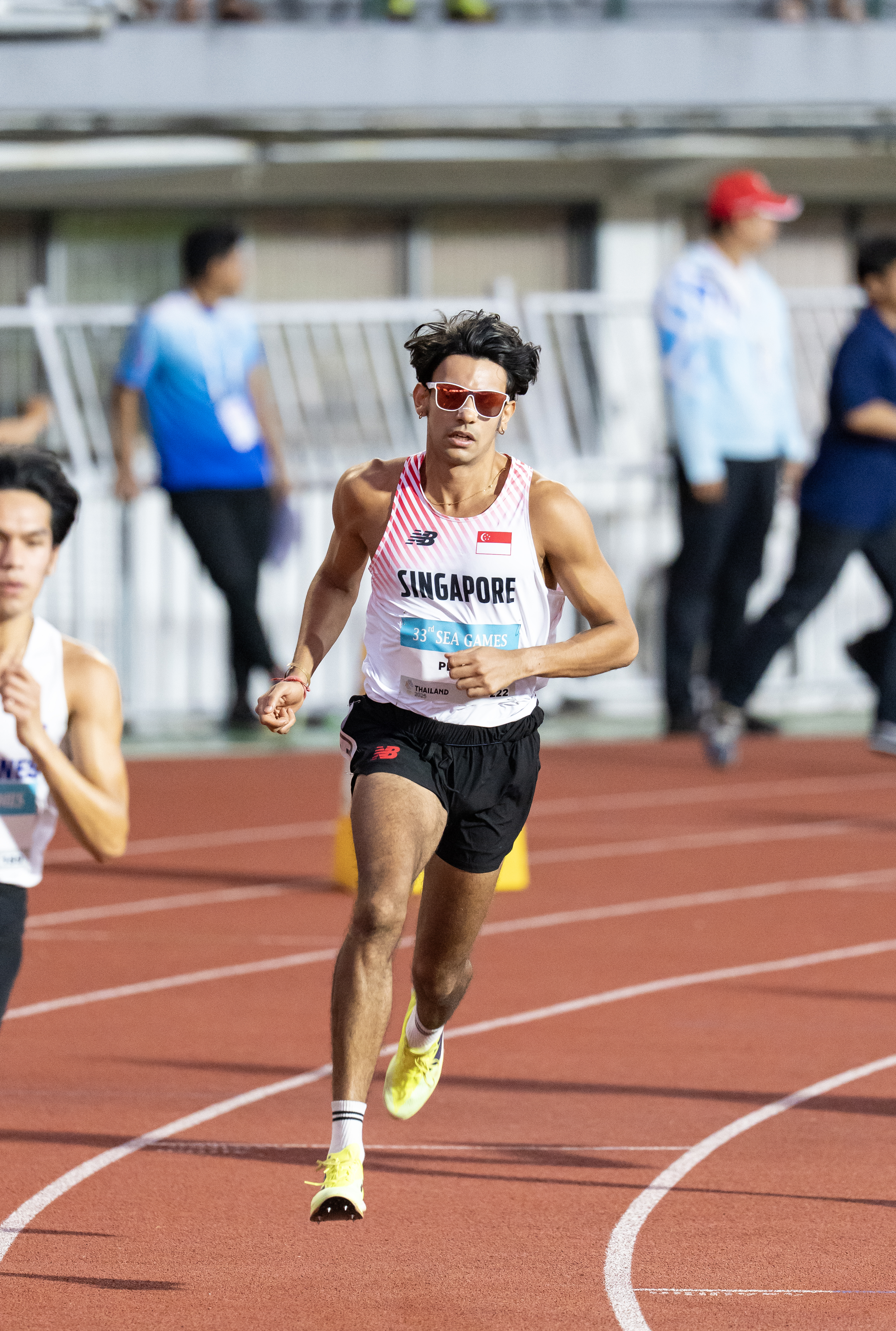
- Zubin running the 800 metres at the 2025 SEA Games

Personal information
- Full name: Zubin Percy Muncherji
- Born: 23 June 1996 (age 30) Singapore

Sport
- Country: Singapore
- Sport: Athletics
- Events: 400 metres, 800 metres
Medal record
Men's Athletics
Representing Singapore
Southeast Asian Games
Bronze medal – third place	2025 Thailand	4 x 400 metres relay

Zubin Percy Muncherji (born 23 June 1996) is a Singapore runner. In 2018, he set the 400 metres national record with a time of 47.02s at the Big Ten Championships in Indiana. In June 2014, at the age of 17, Muncherji broke a 40-year-old Singapore national record when he ran 47.29 seconds in the 400m at the Asian Junior Championships in Taipei, Taiwan.

At the 2025 SEA Games, Zubin, together with Calvin Quek, Reuben Rainer Lee, and Thiruben Thana Rajan, won the bronze in the 4 x 400.

== Career ==
In June 2014, Muncherji took part in the 400m event at the Asian Junior Championships in Taipei and broke the Singapore national record with a time of 47.29 seconds.

While at Indiana University, Muncherji was part of the distance medley relay team which finished second at Big Ten Championships with a time of 9:28.62; finished third in the 400m (49.09s); set a facility record at the Power 5 with the DMR squad (9:31.64)

In May 2018, he broke his record with 47.02 seconds at the Big Ten Championships in Bloomington, Indiana.

During the 2015 SEA Games held at Singapore, Muncherji finished sixth in the 400m final.

During the 2019 SEA Games held at Philippines, Muncherji took part in the 400m, running 48.75 seconds but missed the final by placing fifth in his heat. He was also part of the 4 x 400m relay team, which finished fifth with a time of 3:12.35.

At the 2023 SEA Games in Phnom Penh, Muncherji was part of the 4 × 400 m quartet that broke the national record with 3min 10.11sec.

During the 2023 SEA Games held at Cambodia, Muncherji was part of the 4 x 400m relay team with Ng Chin Hui, Thiruben Thana Rajan and Calvin Quek that broke the national record with 3 minutes 10.11 seconds.

During the 2025 SEA Games held at Thailand, Muncherji won the bronze medal in the 4x400m relay with teammates Reuben Lee, Thiruben Thana Rajan, and Calvin Quek, clocking 3 minutes 10.74 seconds.

By 2026, Muncherji had retired from running.
