= Goh Chui Ling =

Singaporean runner

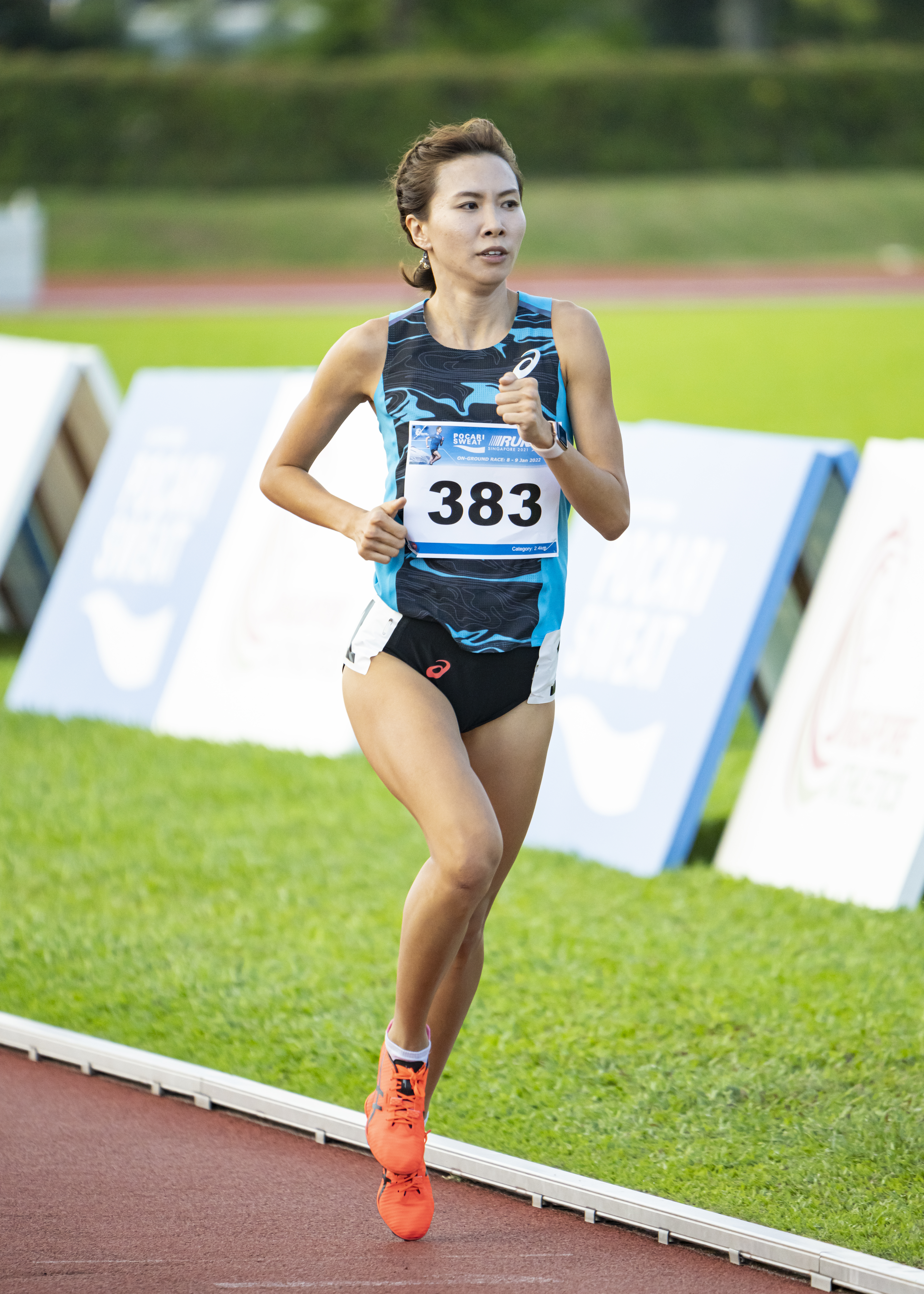
- Goh competing in 2022

Personal information
- National team: Singapore
- Born: 27 November 1992 (age 33) Singapore

Sport
- Sport: Athletics
- Events: 400m, 800m, 1500m, 5000m, 10,000m
Medal record
Women's Athletics
Representing Singapore
Southeast Asian Games
Silver medal – second place	2021 Vietnam	1500 metres
Bronze medal – third place	2021 Vietnam	800 metres
Bronze medal – third place	2021 Vietnam	10,000 metres
Bronze medal – third place	2023 Cambodia	1500 metres
Bronze medal – third place	2023 Cambodia	800 metres

Goh Chui Ling (Chinese: 吴秋玲; pinyin: Wú Qiūlíng; born 27 November 1992) is a Singaporean track and field athlete specialising in middle-distance events. She was a member of the 4x400 women's team and 4x400 mixed team that set the current national records. She also holds the national record for the women's 1,500m, 2.4 km, and 3,000m.

== Sporting career ==
Goh started track and field training when she was 13 years old, when she was pursuing her Singapore-Cambridge GCE Ordinary Level at Macpherson Secondary School. She chose track and field because her two older sisters were also competing in track and field events. She started as a high jumper in secondary school, winning gold at the National Track and Field Championship in 2008. She participated again in the High Jump at the ASEAN Schools Track and Field Championship in 2008, in Danang. When Goh was in Hwa Chong Junior College and National University of Singapore, she branched out into sprints as well.

=== Sprint ===
While studying in NUS, Goh was a recipient of the NUS Sports Scholarship. She was invited to the national senior squad in 2013, and participated in the 400m at the 2013 South-East Asian Games in Naypyidaw. Subsequently, she participated in other major games, such as 2014 Asian Games in Incheon, 2015 Southeast Asian Games and 2016 ASEAN University Games in Singapore, 2017 Asian Athletics in Bhubaneswar, and 2017 Southeast Asian Games in Kuala Lumpur. At the 2015 SEA Games, together with Dipna Lim Prasad, T. Piriyah, and Veronica Shanti Pereira - the team broke the 41-year-old 4 × 400 m record.

=== Middle and long distance ===
On 23 January 2021, Goh raced in the 5,000m for the first time, clocking 17:55.47, which was just outside the SEA Games qualifying mark of 17:52.16. On 17 October 2021, she set a new national mark for 10 km (road) with a time of 37:17.50, breaking the previous mark by 51.50s. A month later, she ran 36:28 for the same event at the Foulee Venissiane race in Lyon. In the same year, she also set personal bests for the 800m (2:09.42) and 1,500m (4:32.56). On 9 January 2022, Goh broke the national record for the 2.4 km with a time of 7:58.50 at the Pocari Sweat Run.

At the 2021 Southeast Asian Games, Goh won the bronze in the 1500m, clocking 4:33.41; this was then upgraded to a silver following a finding of doping against the original silver medallist. She also won the bronze in the 10,000m, clocking 39:22.26, though the latter was only awarded after the Singapore delegation lodged a protest against a Vietnamese runner who came in initially won the silver medal and was disqualified for wearing unapproved shoes.

Goh (502) competing in the 2023 SEA Games, her final appearance in the regional competition

On 16 July 2022, Goh broke the national record for 1,500m at the Flanders Cup in Belgium, clocking 4:27.26, almost 4 seconds faster than the previous record of 4:31.20 set by Kandasamy Jayamani in 1982. On 7 August, she also broke Jayamani's 3,000m record of 9:56.6s by clocking 9:51.16s at the Neustadter Laufermeeting in Germany. This was her seventh national mark, including two relay records. Goh rewrote her national mark for the 1,500m at the 2023 Southeast Asian Games in Phnom Penh when she came in third with a time of 4:26.33. In the same games, she won bronze for 800m with a time of 2:09:15.

On 6 June 2024, Goh broke Yvonne Danson's 27-year-old national record in the 5,000m when she clocked 17m 33.73s in Munich.

== Legal career ==
Goh graduated from the Faculty of Law from the National University of Singapore in 2016, and she was called as an Advocate & Solicitor in the Supreme Court of Singapore in 2017. She joined Edmond Pereira Law Corporation, specialising in civil and criminal litigation. She has been involved in criminal cases, involving corruption, cheating, and breach of international sanctions and civil litigation at the Court of Appeal of Singapore.

Goh graduated from Melbourne Law School in 2021 with a Master of Laws and continued with her research for a Doctor of Philosophy with Melbourne. She has been a visiting researcher with National University of Singapore and the Centre for Asian Legal Studies, and has widely published widely on sports law (including peer-reviewed articles), on topics such as disability sports, anti-doping, e-sports, human rights in sports, gender eligibility, and has spoken on sports law at international seminars.

Goh is on the board of Chiam See Tong Sports Fund, a Singapore sports charity.
