= Michelle Sng =

Singaporean athletics competitor

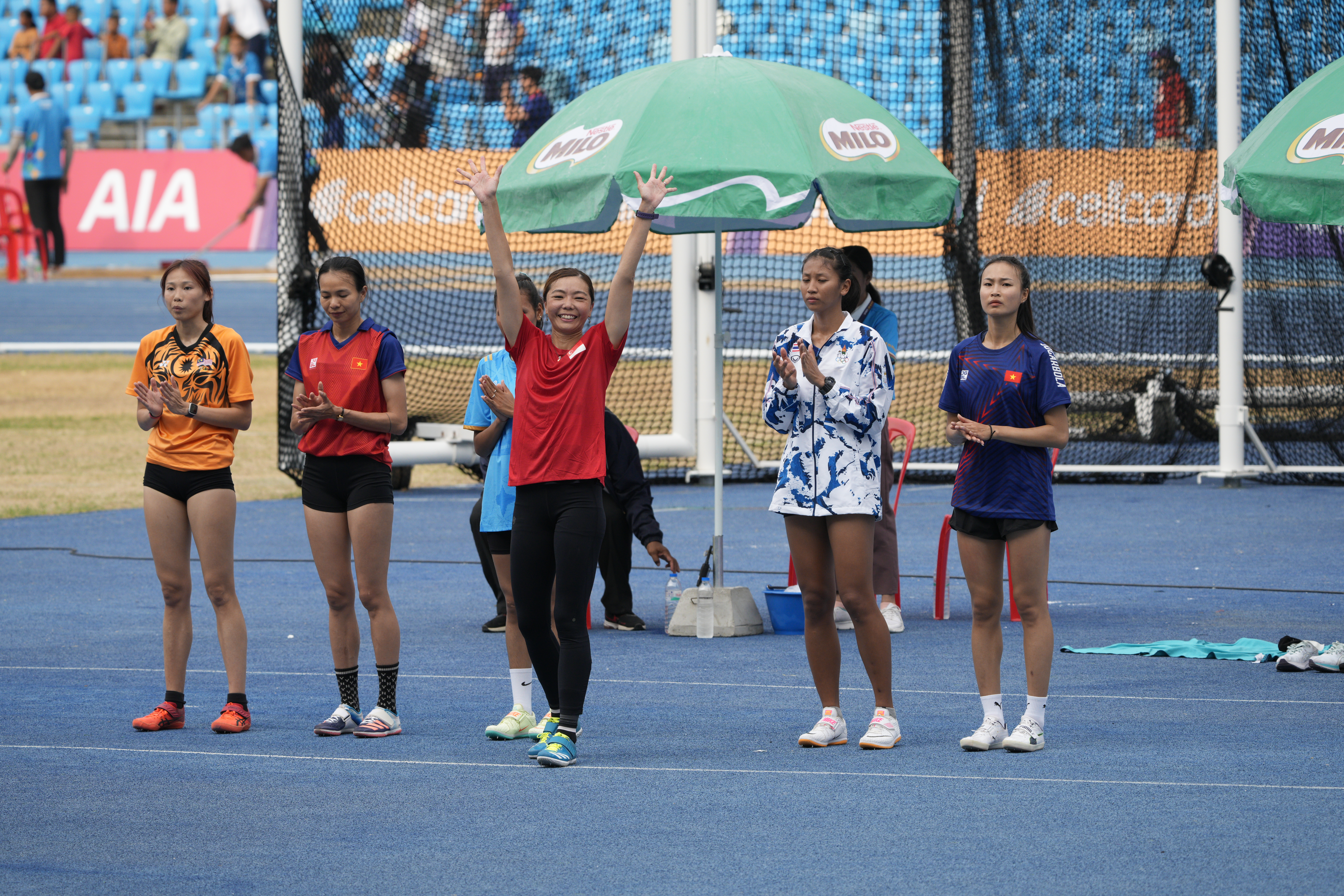
- Sng (arms raised) at the 2023 SEA Games

Personal information
- Full name: Michelle Sng Suat Li
- Born: 19 May 1987 (age 39) Singapore

Sport
- Sport: Athletics
- Event: High jump
Medal record
Women's Athletics
Representing Singapore
Southeast Asian Games
Gold medal – first place	2017 Malaysia	High jump
Silver medal – second place	2021 Vietnam	High jump
Bronze medal – third place	2015 Singapore	High jump
Bronze medal – third place	2023 Cambodia	High jump

Michelle Sng Suat Li (born 19 May 1987) is a former Singapore athlete specialising in the high jump. She holds the national record and has represented Singapore in various regional and international competitions.

Sng first broke the national record in 2006 with a jump of 1.79m. She rewrote her record that year (1.80m), and did so again in 2015 (1.84m) and 2021 (1.86m).

Sng won a bronze (1.81m) in the 2015 SEA Games in Singapore and silver (1.75m) in the 2021 SEA Games in Vietnam; at the 2017 SEA Games in Malaysia, she became the first Singaporean woman to win the event (1.83m) at the competition since 1965. In her final SEA Games in Cambodia in 2023, she won a bronze (1.73m).

Sng has also represented Singapore at the Asian Games (2006 and 2018), Asian Athletics Championships, and Commonwealth Games.
