= Soh Rui Yong =

Singaporean long-distance runner (born 1991)

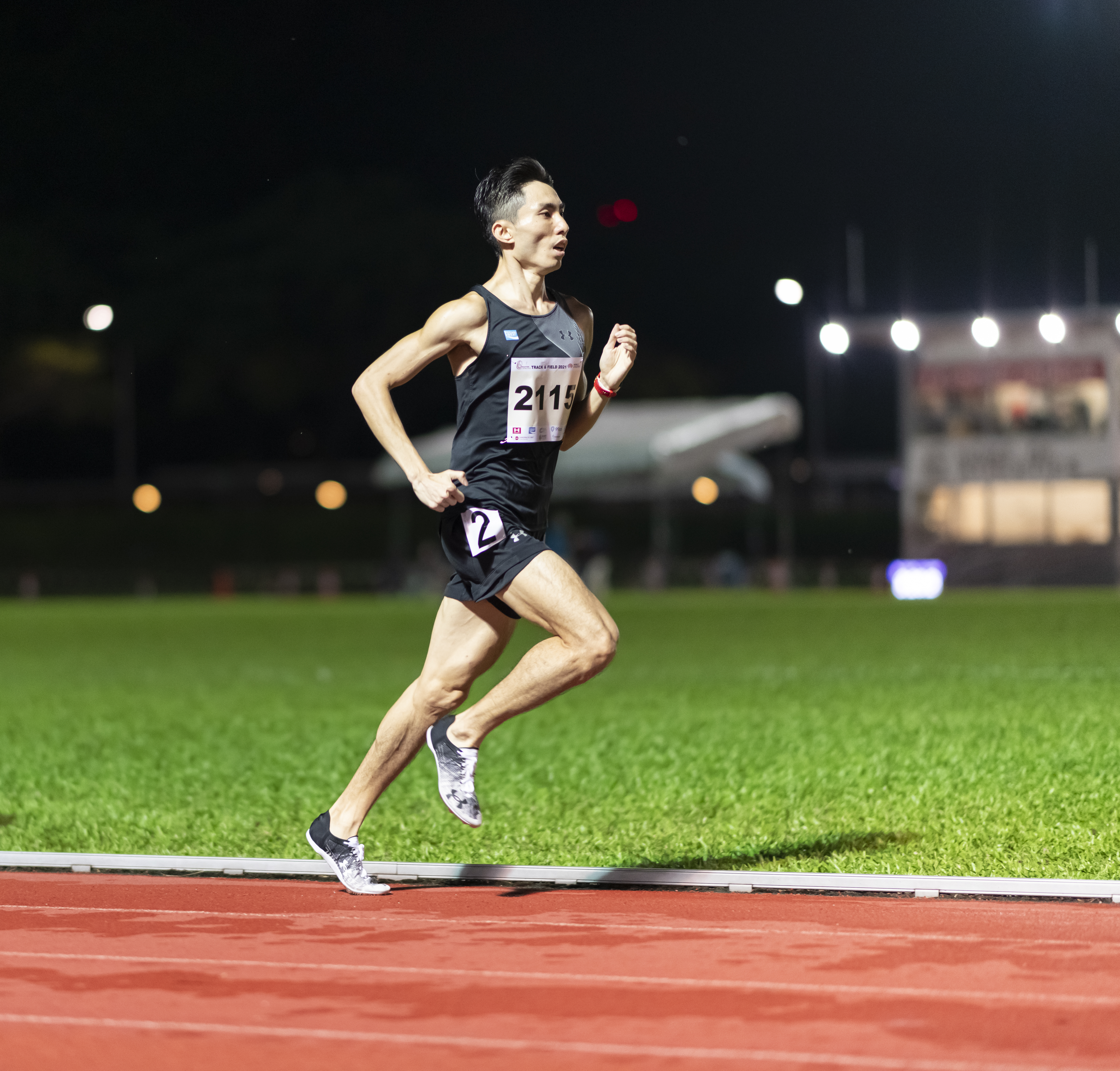
- Soh in 2021

Personal information
- Born: 6 August 1991 (age 35) Singapore
- Spouse: Nantacha (2023–present)

Chinese name
- Simplified Chinese: 苏睿勇
- Traditional Chinese: 蘇睿勇
- Hanyu Pinyin: Sū Ruìyǒng

Sport
- Country: Singapore
- Turned pro: 2016
- Coached by: Self-coached

Achievements and titles
- Personal bests: 5000 m (Track): 14:36.22 (NR); 10,000 m (Track): 30:33.29 (NR); Half marathon: 1:06:45 (NR); Marathon: 2:22:59 (NR)
Medal record
Men's athletics
Representing Singapore
Southeast Asian Games
Gold medal – first place	2015 Singapore	Marathon
Gold medal – first place	2017 Kuala Lumpur	Marathon
Silver medal – second place	2023 Cambodia	10000 m

Guillaume Soh Rui Yong (Chinese: 苏睿勇; pinyin: Sū Ruìyǒng; born 6 August 1991) is a Singaporean national long-distance runner and holder of five national records: 5,000m (track & road), 10,000m (track), half marathon and marathon. Soh has been described as the "most outstanding long-distance runner in our history" by the President of Singapore, Tharman Shanmugaratnam, hailing Soh's "mental stamina".

Soh also holds the Guinness World Record for "Fastest marathon in a suit (male)" with a timing of 02:39:57.

In 2017, Soh became the first Singaporean male marathoner to win back-to-back SEA Games titles when he won gold again at the Southeast Asian Games. In 2023, Soh also became the first ever Singaporean to win a silver medal in the 10,000m at the SEA Games. Soh has been acknowledged for various acts of sportsmanship by his competitors in which he had offered help to them during the race at various events throughout his career. Soh is also a 5-time Standard Chartered Singapore Marathon national champion, having won every edition of the Singapore national marathon championships since it began in 2017.

Soh was embroiled in 3 legal disputes involving former national runner Ashley Liew, as well as Singapore Athletics and Malik Aljunied of the Singapore National Olympic Council between 2019 and 2022 which led him to be excluded from participating in two consecutive SEA Games in 2019 and 2021. He made his return to the Singapore team for the SEA Games in 2023.

== Early life ==
Soh was born in Singapore in 1991. Soh's mother is a teacher, and his younger sister Romaine is also an accomplished runner. When Soh was at Raffles Institution, he won the A Division individual cross-country title two years in a row.

== Education ==
Soh graduated from the University of Oregon in the United States, where he studied business administration.

Soh graduated from University College London with a law degree in September 2024.

As of December 2024, Soh is completing a Master of Business Administration (MBA) course at London Business School.

== Career ==
In September 2012, Soh became the fastest Singaporean at the annual Army Half Marathon with a timing of 1:12:25. At the half marathon event, his sportmanship was acknowledged by Ashley Liew, a fellow Singaporean athlete, when he stopped mid-way the race to see if Liew needed help after tripping at a carpeted kerb.

On 14 June 2014, Soh set a new national record for the 10,000m track event at the Portland Track Festival with a timing of 31:15.95, beating the previous record of 31:19:00 set by P.C. Suppiah in November 1973.

=== 2015–2019: SEA Games and Standard Charted Singapore Marathon successes ===
Soh won his first marathon gold at the 2015 Southeast Asian Games and became the first Singaporean male marathoner to win back-to-back SEA Games titles when he won gold again at the 2017 SEA Games despite almost being expelled from the team a week before the race. In the 2017 SEA Games, in an act of sportmanship, Soh had offered his drink to Indonesian runner, Agus Prayogo, after Prayogo missed taking his at a designated hydration point. However Prayogo declined, reasoning that each runner had his own drink. Prayogo clinched silver medal for the race.

In August 2017, Soh courted controversy when he was given a formal warning by the Singapore National Olympic Council (SNOC).

Soh has been undefeated since the inaugural Singapore Marathon National Championships, winning in 2017, 2018, and 2019. The national championships were not held in 2020 and 2021 due to the COVID-19 pandemic in Singapore, while in 2022, the national championship was dropped from the event. The national championship returned to the event in 2023, with Soh winning again.

=== 2019–2022: Not selected for national representation ===
On 20 January 2019, Soh set a new half marathon national record of 66:46 at the 2019 Aramco Houston Half Marathon, breaking Mok Ying Ren's 3-year-old record of 67:08. This made him the only Singapore man in history to concurrently hold the 10,000m (31:15.95) and half marathon national records. On 17 March 2019, Soh broke the Singapore marathon record after finishing the Seoul Marathon in 2:23:42. However, Soh was not selected to compete in the 2019 SEA Games by SNOC to defend his marathon gold despite being nominated by SA. In spite of not being selected to compete, Soh continued to support the Singapore team, coaching Gordon Lim, who was selected for the 2019 SEA Games Marathon. Soh also competed at the 2019 Standard Chartered Singapore Marathon National Championship and won his third national marathon crown in 3 years, earning $10,000 for his efforts.

On 17 July 2021, at the Singapore Athletics All Comers Meet 4, Soh clocked 14:44.21 for the 5,000m, breaking Mok's record of 14:51.09. With this result, Soh became the holder of four national records: 5,000m, 10,000m, half-marathon, and marathon.

On 4 September 2021, Soh clocked 6:53.18 in a 2.4 km run – the fastest recorded time in Singapore. He issued a challenge to all Singaporeans to clock a sub-7 timing; anyone succeeding would receive $700 and 700 bottles of Pocari Sweat paid by Soh. The challenge was eventually carried out at Pocari Sweat Run, a local running event, on 8 January 2022. In it, Jeevaneesh Soundararajah set a new record at 6:52.97.

On 28 November 2021, Soh took on the fastest Gurkha soldier in Singapore, Subas Gurung, over 10,000m at the Singapore Athletics Allcomers 5 Track Meet. Soh won the race in 31:28.67, becoming the first Singaporean in history to qualify for the Asian Games 10,000m final.

On 5 December 2021, Soh broke his national record for the marathon when he ran 2:22:59 at the Valencia Marathon. This performance made him the first marathon runner in Singapore history to qualify for the Asian Games Marathon.

On 17 February 2022, SNOC announced that Soh would be excluded from 2021 Southeast Asian Games that was held in Hanoi in May 2022. The 2021 SEA Games was delayed due to COVID-19 pandemic. The basis for the exclusion was similar to that for his exclusion from the 2019 SEA Games, on his conduct and behaviour "continu[ing] to fall short" of the standards SNOC expected of its athletes.

On 17 June 2022, Soh would rewrite his 2014 national record for the 10,000m track event with a timing of 31:12.05 at the England Athletics' Championships.

=== 2023–present: SEA Games, Asian Games, records and running academy ===
==== 2023 SEA Games ====
On 25 March 2023, The Straits Times reported that Soh had been selected for the 2023 Southeast Asian Games by the Singapore National Olympic Council, bringing an end to years of dispute between the two parties; this allowed him to compete in the 5,000m and 10,000m events. With just 6 weeks to prepare, Soh finished 4th in the SEA Games 5,000m. That was just 4 seconds short of his own national record and clinched silver in the 10,000m, ending Singapore's 40-year wait for a medal in the event.

In the 10,000m event, Soh offered another Indonesian rival Rikki Marthin Luther Simbolon a drink after Simbolon missed taking his drink. In addition to the media coverage of the act of sportsmanship in Singapore, it was reported in various Indonesian and other international media as well.

==== Exclusion from 19th Asian Games ====
On 10 June 2023, Soh was not selected for Singapore's 2022 Asian Games line-up (delayed due to COVID-19 pandemic), after the SNOC claimed that he had made 'disparaging' remarks. The SNOC had sent Singapore Athletics a list of comments and remarks made by Soh a week before SNOC's appeal committee met on 7 June 2023. These comments were allegedly made in relation to the previous dispute over the credibility surrounding Ashley Liew's 2015 “act of sportmanship”, as well as a current teammate, religion, and use of vulgarities among others. SNOC has not publicly provided evidence to substantiate these allegations. Despite Soh deleting the comments he made online, the SNOC upheld their decision, stating that the "behaviour does not commensurate with his apology given". The SNOC’s decision was criticised in the Singapore Parliament on 6 July 2023 by Leader of the Opposition, Pritam Singh and NCMP Leong Mun Wai, with both backing Soh to represent Singapore at the 2023 Asian Games.

==== Setting national records ====
On 8 August 2023, Soh set a new Singapore record in the 5 km road race, finishing 3rd in the Sri Chinmoy Kangaroo Hop 5k in London. While there were no national records for the 5 km road race recorded previously, Singapore Athletics said it “recognised Soh’s achievement” as it fulfils the criteria of having UK Athletics race permits and a course accuracy certification. Soh's timing of 15min 15sec is slightly slower than his 5,000m track timing of 14min 44sec.

On 22 October 2023, at the Valencia Half Marathon, Soh rewrote his Half Marathon national record of 1:06:45 by 1 second for a timing of 1:06:45. In the same race, Soh passed through the 10 km mark with a split timing of 31:39, breaking the previous record of 32:10, co-held by Mok Ying Ren & Jeevaneesh Soundararajah. By setting a new record in the 10 km (Road), Soh now holds six national records concurrently.

On 13 September 2024, Soh broke his own 5 km road national record by 7 seconds, running 15:08 at the Podium Friday Night Under The Lights 5K at Battersea Park. This was made even more notable because Soh had just turned 33 years old and graduated with his law degree in the week leading up to this new record.

On 21 September 2024, Soh set a new Singapore record in the road mile event at the Westminster Mile in London. As a result, Soh reached a new high of holding 7 national records for a matter of hours before Shaun Goh, Soh's 2023 SEA Games 10,000m teammate who Soh has mentored since, broke his 10 km road record the next day.

==== Running academy ====
In January 2024, Soh launched the RunSohFast Marathon Academy, with the mission of imparting his knowledge to other runners. The aim of the academy is to help fellow runners improve while having fun and he is also looking for ways to expand and give opportunities to up-and-coming runners in the future.

==== Guinness World Record attempt ====
On 27 April 2025, at the TCS London Marathon, Soh set a new Guinness World Record for "Fastest marathon in a suit (male)" with a timing of 02:39:57, wearing a 3-piece BOSS suit.

==== 2025 SEA Games & 2025 Standard Chartered Singapore Marathon ====
After a successful appeal by Singapore Athletics, Soh is set to be part of Team Singapore’s contingent at the 2025 SEA Games in Thailand. On 4 December, Soh went for a routine pre-Games medical screening at Changi General Hospital (CGH), where he was informed that he might not be cleared to compete due to an abnormal electrocardiography result. Further testing was conducted at Sport Singapore’s (SportSG) High Performance Sport Institute (HPSI). In spite of the health concerns, Soh took part in the annual Singapore Marathon and won winning the national rankings for both the half marathon and then the full marathon less than 24 hours later. Shortly after, he was cleared to compete at the SEA Games.

== Sponsorship ==
In 2021, Soh signed a four year endorsement deal with Under Armour, an American apparel brand, to be part of its global athletes programme. In the same year, Soh was signed on as a brand ambassador of Takagi Ramen, a Singapore ramen chain, and also gained sponsorship deal with Pocari Sweat, a Japanese isotonic drink brand.

== Legal disputes ==
=== Disputing Ashley Liew's act of sportsmanship ===
In October 2018, Soh disputed fellow runner Ashley Liew's version of events surrounding the 2015 SEA Games marathon. For this, Liew was awarded the Special Award for Sportsmanship by Singapore National Olympic Council and the International Fair Play Committee's (CIFP) Pierre de Coubertin World Fair Play Trophy in 2016. 3 other witnesses, including Filipino runner Rafael Poliquit Jr. who was also in the same race, backed Soh's version of events in the media.

Liew took Soh to the courts for defamation after serving Soh legal letters offering him an opportunity to retract his statements. Soh subsequently filed a counterclaim. On 23 September 2021, District Judge Lee Li Choon "found that the words in Soh's statements were defamatory, or bore defamatory meanings." Lee granted orders to have the defamatory statements removed; Soh to issue a statement declaring that the statements are false and to retract the false statements and publish an apology; and an injunction against future republishing of the statements. Soh was also ordered to pay S$180,000 in damages, of which he turned to crowdfunding as Liew's lawyers requested for immediate payment. Soh appealed to the High Court, and was heard 28 March 2022 with the appeal dismissed. Justice Valerie Thean upheld District Judge Lee's rulings and orders to Soh not to repeat the statements and to remove them, but also had set aside the order to publish an apology and public statement of retraction of the defamatory statements. Soh reflected that he would respect the decision and move on from this. When the payment of the full sum of $320,000 was made on 5 April 2022, Soh then challenged Liew to donate the $180,000 damage cost to "prove [his] sportmanship" as it was funded with donations Soh crowdfunded from the public, however Liew did not comment on the challenge.

=== Exclusion from 2019 SEA Games ===
For 2019 SEA Games, Soh's nomination by Singapore Athletics (SA) was rejected by the Singapore National Olympic Council (SNOC) for "display[ing] conduct that falls short of the standards of attitude and behaviour" that SNOC expected of its athletes. SNOC had earlier served Soh a legal letter to withdraw his allegations against Ashley Liew. A debate ensued over whether a potential medallist should be barred from being a national representative due to personal conduct issues. After failing to obtain explanations from SA and SNOC over their statements made of him through an exchange of legal letters, Soh filed defamation writs and statement of claims against SA and SA executive director Syed Abdul Malik Aljunied.

After the management of SA was changed on 25 September 2020, both parties reached a truce in which Soh stood down on his lawsuits against SA, and SA withdrawing its media statements on Soh "breach[ing] (SA’s) Athletic Code of Conduct” and that for "his transgressions, (SA) had attempted to counsel and reason with him, as part of a holistic rehabilitation process"; extending an apology to him; and stood down the disciplinary actions that the previous management had taken against him. The defamation case against Malik continued and was heard on 12 January 2022. The case concluded on 8 June 2022, with District Judge Lim Wee Ming accepting Malik's defence of justification in defaming Soh. However, Malik himself admitted to taking down the Facebook post in question, because they were not "in good taste", and that the words he had used painted a "negative" and "unflattering" picture of Soh. Malik also admitted that he had made the post "impulsively" and "without carefully considering meanings of each of the words he posted".

== Personal life ==
Soh was married to Nantacha in September 2023.
