= Yvonne Danson =

Singaporean marathon runner of English descent

Personal information
- National team: Singapore
- Citizenship: Singaporean
- Born: 22 May 1959 (age 67) London, England

Sport
- Country: England; Singapore
- Sport: Athletics
Medal record
Women's Athletics
Representing England
Commonwealth Games
Bronze medal – third place	1994 Victoria	Marathon
Representing Singapore
Southeast Asian Games
Silver medal – second place	1995 Chiang Mai	Marathon
Bronze medal – third place	1995 Chiang Mai	10,000 m

Yvonne Margaret Danson (born 22 May 1959 in London, United Kingdom) is a female former road running athlete.

== Athletics career ==
Danson represented England at the 1994 Commonwealth Games in Victoria, Canada, winning the bronze medal in the women's marathon.

Danson achieved her personal best a year later at the 1995 Boston Marathon with a time of 2 hours, 30 minutes and 53 seconds, which earned her 5th place. Living in Singapore at the time, Danson took up citizenship in order to represent Singapore in international competitions. At the 1995 Southeast Asian Games in Chiang Mai, Thailand, she claimed the silver medal in the marathon. Her time of 2 hours, 34 minutes and 41 seconds remains the Singapore national record. She also set a Singapore national record of 36 minutes 27 seconds in the 10,000 metres at the same Games, winning the bronze medal.

Danson represented Singapore at the 1996 Olympic Games in Atlanta, finishing in 38th place out of a field of 86 runners. She also holds the Singapore national record for the 5,000 metres, having run the distance in 17 minutes 35.3 seconds in Singapore in 1997.

== Achievements ==
- All results regarding marathon, unless stated otherwise

Year	Competition	Venue	Position	Notes
Representing England
1994	Commonwealth Games	Victoria, Canada	3rd	2:32:24
Representing Singapore
1996	Olympic Games	Atlanta, United States	38th	2:39:18
