= Athletics at the 2017 SEA Games – Women's Results =

The women's athletics competitions at the 2017 SEA Games in Kuala Lumpur took place at Bukit Jalil National Stadium in Kuala Lumpur.

The 2017 Games featured competitions in 22 events (11 track, 2 road, 8 field and 1 combined).

== 100 metres ==
Athletics – Women's 100m at the 2017 SEA Games
- Venue: Bukit Jalil National Stadium, Kuala Lumpur
- Date: 22 August 2017
- Competitors: 12 from 7 nations

Medalists
gold medal	Le Tu Chinh	Vietnam
silver medal	Zaidatul Husniah Zulkifli	Malaysia
bronze medal	Veronica Shanti Pereira	Singapore

=== Records ===
Prior to this competition, the existing Asian and SEA Games records were as follows:

AR	Li Xuemei (CHN)	10.79	Shanghai, China	18 October 1997
GR	Lydia de Vega (PHI)	11.28	Jakarta, Indonesia	16 September 1987

=== Results ===
Green denotes finalists.

Rank	Athlete	Heat 1			Heat 2			Final	
Rank	Athlete	Lane	Time	Rank	Lane	Time	Rank	Lane	Time
1st place, gold medalist(s)	Le Tu Chinh (VIE)	4	11.49	1	—	—	—	6	11.56
2nd place, silver medalist(s)	Zaidatul Husniah Zulkifli (MAS)	—	—	—	4	11.61	1	5	11.74
3rd place, bronze medalist(s)	Veronica Shanti Pereira (SGP)	—	—	—	7	11.73	2	4	11.76
4	Supawan Thipat (THA)	6	11.87	3	—	—	—	9	11.83
5	Siti Fatimah Mohamad (MAS)	3	11.80	2	—	—	—	7	11.85
6	Tassaporn Wannakit (THA)	—	—	—	3	11.89	4	2	11.891
7	Le Thi Mong Tuyen (VIE)	—	—	—	6	11.82	3	8	11.897
8	Zion Rose Nelson (PHI)	5	11.88	4	—	—	—	3	12.01
9	Wendy Enn (SGP)	7	12.18	5	—	—	—	did not advance	
10	Silina Phaaphay (LAO)	—	—	—	8	12.65	5	did not advance	
11	Duong Sreypheap (CAM)	8	12.86	6	—	—	—	did not advance	
12	Kayla Anise Richardson (PHI)	did not start							

== 200 metres ==
Athletics – Women's 200m at the 2017 SEA Games
- Venue: Bukit Jalil National Stadium, Kuala Lumpur
- Date: 23 August 2017
- Competitors: 10 from 7 nations

Medalists
gold medal	Le Tu Chinh	Vietnam
silver medal	Zaidatul Husniah Zulkifli	Malaysia
bronze medal	Veronica Shanti Pereira	Singapore

=== Records ===
Prior to this competition, the existing Asian and SEA Games records were as follows:

AR	Li Xuemei (CHN)	22.01	Shanghai, China	22 October 1997
GR	Supavadee Khawpeag (THA)	23.30	Kuala Lumpur, Malaysia	15 September 2001

=== Results ===
Green denotes finalists.

Rank	Athlete	Heat 1			Heat 2			Final	
Rank	Athlete	Lane	Time	Rank	Lane	Time	Rank	Lane	Time
1st place, gold medalist(s)	Le Tu Chinh (VIE)	3	23.63	1	—	—	—	4	23.32
2nd place, silver medalist(s)	Zaidatul Husniah Zulkifli (MAS)	—	—	—	3	23.96	1	5	23.64
3rd place, bronze medalist(s)	Veronica Shanti Pereira (SGP)	4	24.17	2	—	—	—	7	23.68
4	Zion Rose Nelson (PHI)	5	24.56	3	—	—	—	8	24.26
5	Kayla Anise Richardson (PHI)	—	—	—	4	24.57	2	6	24.29
6	Kanyarat Pakdee (THA)	—	—	—	7	24.73	3	9	24.58
7	Tassaporn Wannakit (THA)	6	24.84	4	—	—	—	3	24.63
8	Kugapriya Chandran (SGP)	—	—	—	5	25.38	4	2	25.30
9	Silina Phaaphay (LAO)	—	—	—	6	25.51	5	did not advance	
10	Duong Sreypheap (CAM)	7	26.56	5	—	—	—	did not advance	

== 400 metres ==
Athletics – Women's 400m at the 2017 SEA Games
- Venue: Bukit Jalil National Stadium, Kuala Lumpur
- Date: 24 August 2017
- Competitors: 6 from 4 nations

Medalists
gold medal	Nguyễn Thị Huyền	Vietnam
silver medal	Dipna Lim Prasad	Singapore
bronze medal	Supanich Poolkerd	Thailand

=== Records ===
Prior to this competition, the existing Asian and SEA Games records were as follows:

AR	Ma Yuqin (CHN)	49.81	Beijing, China	11 September 1993
GR	Nguyen Thi Tinh (VIE)	51.83	Hanoi, Vietnam	8 December 2003

=== Results ===
Rank	Athlete	Final	
Rank	Athlete	Lane	Time
1st place, gold medalist(s)	Nguyễn Thị Huyền (VIE)	6	52.48
2nd place, silver medalist(s)	Dipna Lim Prasad (SGP)	5	54.18
3rd place, bronze medalist(s)	Supanich Poolkerd (THA)	7	54.55
4	Pornpan Hoemhuk (THA)	9	55.59
5	Fathin Faqihah Mohd. Yusof (MAS)	4	56.72
6	Nurul Faizah Asma Mazlan (MAS)	8	57.10

== 800 metres ==
Athletics – Women's 800m at the 2017 SEA Games
- Venue: Bukit Jalil National Stadium, Kuala Lumpur
- Date: 23 August 2017
- Competitors: 7 from 5 nations

Medalists
gold medal	Vu Thị Ly	Vietnam
silver medal	Khuat Phuong Anh	Vietnam
bronze medal	Swe Li Myint	Myanmar

=== Records ===
Prior to this competition, the existing Asian and SEA Games records were as follows:

AR	Liu Dong (CHN)	1:55.54	Beijing, China	9 September 1993
GR	Trương Thanh Hằng (VIE)	2:02.39	Nakhon Ratchasima, Thailand	8 December 2007

=== Results ===
Rank	Athlete	Final	
Rank	Athlete	Lane	Time
1st place, gold medalist(s)	Vu Thị Ly (VIE)	7	2:07.11
2nd place, silver medalist(s)	Khuat Phuong Anh (VIE)	5	2:09.05
3rd place, bronze medalist(s)	Swe Li Myint (MYA)	8	2:12.31
4	Apinya Athiwet (THA)	4	2:16.42
5	Savinder Kaur (MAS)	6	2:16.79
6	Angela Freitas De Fatima Araujo (TLS)	9	2:20.25
7	Liliana Da Costa (TLS)	3	2:28.40

== 1500 metres ==
Athletics – Women's 1500m at the 2017 SEA Games
- Venue: Bukit Jalil National Stadium, Kuala Lumpur
- Date: 24 August 2017
- Competitors: 7 from 5 nations

Medalists
gold medal	Nguyen Thi Oanh	Vietnam
silver medal	Vu Thi Ly	Vietnam
bronze medal	Lodkeo Inthakoumman	Laos

=== Records ===
Prior to this competition, the existing Asian and SEA Games records were as follows:

AR	Qu Yunxia (CHN)	3:50.46	Beijing, China	11 September 1993
GR	Trương Thanh Hằng (VIE)	4:11.60	Nakhon Ratchasima, Thailand	7 December 2007

=== Results ===
Rank	Athlete	Final	
Rank	Athlete	Lane	Time
1st place, gold medalist(s)	Nguyen Thi Oanh (VIE)	4	4:20.51
2nd place, silver medalist(s)	Vu Thị Ly (VIE)	6	4:30.68
3rd place, bronze medalist(s)	Lodkeo Inthakoumman (LAO)	2	4:37.24
4	Savinder Kaur (MAS)	5	4:46.59
5	Angela Freitas De Fatima Araujo (TLS)	1	4:47.83
6	Woraphan Nuanlsri (THA)	7	4:51.53
7	Liliana Da Costa (TLS)	3	5:19.21

== 5000 metres ==
Athletics – Women's 5000m at the 2017 SEA Games
- Venue: Bukit Jalil National Stadium, Kuala Lumpur
- Date: 25 August 2017
- Competitors: 9 from 6 nations

Medalists
gold medal	Nguyen Thi Oanh	Vietnam
silver medal	Pham Thi Hue	Vietnam
bronze medal	Triyaningsih	Indonesia

=== Records ===
Prior to this competition, the existing Asian and SEA Games records were as follows:

AR	Jiang Bo (CHN)	14:28.09	Shanghai, China	23 October 1997
GR	Triyaningsih (INA)	15:54.32	Nakhon Ratchasima, Thailand	8 December 2007

=== Results ===
Rank	Athlete	Final	
Rank	Athlete	Lane	Time
1st place, gold medalist(s)	Nguyen Thi Oanh (VIE)	4	17:23.20
2nd place, silver medalist(s)	Pham Thi Hue (VIE)	9	17:33.45
3rd place, bronze medalist(s)	Triyaningsih (INA)	6	17:36.98
4	Oliva Sadi (INA)	3	17:38.59
5	Woraphan Nuanlsri (THA)	7	17:57.84
6	Lodkeo Inthakoumman (LAO)	1	18:07.33
7	Suneeka Prichaprong (THA)	5	18:47.77
8	Khin Mar Se (MYA)	2	19:02.56
9	Yuan Yufang (MAS)	DNS	

== 10000 metres ==
Athletics – Women's 10000m at the 2017 SEA Games
- Venue: Bukit Jalil National Stadium, Kuala Lumpur
- Date: 24 August 2017
- Competitors: 6 from 4 nations

Medalists
gold medal	Triyaningsih	Indonesia
silver medal	Pham Thi Hue	Vietnam
bronze medal	Pham Thi Hong Le	Vietnam

=== Records ===
Prior to this competition, the existing Asian and SEA Games records were as follows:

AR	Wang Junxia (CHN)	29:31.78	Beijing, China	8 September 1993
GR	Triyaningsih (INA)	32:49.47	Vientiane, Laos	17 December 2009

=== Results ===
Rank	Athlete	Final	
Rank	Athlete	Lane	Time
1st place, gold medalist(s)	Triyaningsih (INA)	2	36:39.37
2nd place, silver medalist(s)	Pham Thi Hue (VIE)	1	36:54.02
3rd place, bronze medalist(s)	Pham Thi Hong Le (VIE)	6	37:06.64
4	Oliva Sadi (INA)	5	37:58.60
5	Natthaya Thanaronnawat (THA)	4	39:04.69
6	Khin Mar Se (MYA)	3	41:05.05

== 100 metres hurdles ==
Athletics – Women's 100m hurdles at the 2017 SEA Games
- Venue: Bukit Jalil National Stadium, Kuala Lumpur
- Date: 26 August 2017
- Competitors: 7 from 6 nations

Medalists
gold medal	Trần Thị Yến Hoa	Vietnam
silver medal	Raja Nursheena	Malaysia
bronze medal	Nur Izlyn Zaini	Singapore

=== Records ===
Prior to this competition, the existing Asian and SEA Games records were as follows:

AR	Olga Shishigina (KAZ)	12.44	Lucerne, Switzerland	27 June 1995
GR	Trecia Roberts (THA)	12.85	Bandar Seri Begawan, Brunei	9 August 1999

=== Results ===
Rank	Athlete	Final	
Rank	Athlete	Lane	Time
1st place, gold medalist(s)	Trần Thị Yến Hoa (VIE)	6	13.40
2nd place, silver medalist(s)	Raja Nursheena (MAS)	4	13.92
3rd place, bronze medalist(s)	Nur Izlyn Zaini (SGP)	7	14.14
4	Manivanh Chanthavong (LAO)	2	14.40
5	Nur Syafiqah Anis (MAS)	8	14.49
6	Emilia Nova (INA)	3	14.52
7	Suchada Meesri (THA)	5	DNF

== 400 metres hurdles ==
Athletics – Women's 400m hurdles at the 2017 SEA Games
- Venue: Bukit Jalil National Stadium, Kuala Lumpur
- Date: 22 August 2017
- Competitors: 7 from 4 nations

Medalists
gold medal	Nguyễn Thị Huyền	Vietnam
silver medal	Dipna Lim Prasad	Singapore
bronze medal	Jutamas Khonkham	Thailand

=== Records ===
Prior to this competition, the existing Asian and SEA Games records were as follows:

AR	Han Qing (CHN)	53.96	Beijing, China	9 September 1993
GR	Nguyễn Thị Huyền (VIE)	56.15	Singapore	10 June 2015

=== Results ===
Rank	Athlete	Final	
Rank	Athlete	Lane	Time
1st place, gold medalist(s)	Nguyễn Thị Huyền (VIE)	5	56.06 GR
2nd place, silver medalist(s)	Dipna Lim Prasad (SGP)	6	60.55
3rd place, bronze medalist(s)	Jutamas Khonkham (THA)	7	60.73
4	Wassana Winatho (THA)	3	60.98
5	Nurul Faizah Asma Mazlan (MAS)	8	62.31
6	Goh Chui Ling (SGP)	9	63.28
7	Saidatul Izzati Suhaimi (MAS)	4	64.31

== 4 × 100 metres relay ==
Athletics – Women's 4 × 100m relay at the 2017 SEA Games
- Venue: Bukit Jalil National Stadium, Kuala Lumpur
- Date: 25 August 2017
- Competitors: 20 from 5 nations

Medalists
gold medal	Le Thị Mộng Tuyền; Đỗ Thị Quyền; Trần Thị Yến Hoa; Lê Tú Chinh	Vietnam
silver medal	Parichat Charoensuk; Kanyarat Pakdee; Tassaporn Wannakit; Supawan Thipat	Thailand
bronze medal	Zion Rose Nelson; Kayla Anise Richardson; Kyla Ashley Richardson; Eloiza Luzon	Philippines

=== Records ===
Prior to this competition, the existing Asian and SEA Games records were as follows:

AR	China (Xiao Lin, Li Yali, Liu Xiaomei, Li Xuemei)	42.23	Shanghai, China	23 October 1997
GR	Thailand (Phatsorn Jaksuninkorn, Orranut Klomdee, Tassaporn Wannakit, Nongnuch Sanrat)	44.00	Naypyidaw, Myanmar	10 December 2013

=== Results ===
Rank	Athlete	Final	
Rank	Athlete	Lane	Time
1st place, gold medalist(s)	Vietnam (Le Thị Mộng Tuyền, Đỗ Thị Quyên, Trần Thị Yến Hoa, Lê Tú Chinh)	7	43.88 GR
2nd place, silver medalist(s)	Thailand (Parichat Charoensuk, Kanyarat Pakdee, Tassaporn Wannakit, Supawan Thipat)	6	44.62
3rd place, bronze medalist(s)	Philippines (Zion Rose Nelson, Kayla Anise Richardson, Kyla Ashley Richardson, Eloiza Luzon)	4	44.81
4	Singapore (Wendy Enn, Dipna Lim Prasad, Veronica Shanti Pereira, Nur Izlyn Zaini)	5	44.96
5	Malaysia (Azreen Nabila, Fathin Faqihah, Siti Fatima Mohamed, Zaidatul Husniah Zulkifli)	3	45.39

== 4 × 400 metres relay ==
Athletics – Women's 4 × 400m relay at the 2017 SEA Games
- Venue: Bukit Jalil National Stadium, Kuala Lumpur
- Date: 26 August 2017
- Competitors: 20 from 5 nations

Medalists
gold medal	Nguyễn Thị Oanh; Quách Thị Lan; Hoàng Thị Ngọc; Nguyễn Thị Huyền	Vietnam
silver medal	Pornpan Hoemhuk; Atchima Eng-Chuan; Treewadee Yongphan; Supanich Poolkerd	Thailand
bronze medal	Nurul Faizah Asma Mazlan; Shereen Samson Vallabuoy; Tanalaksiumy Rayer; Fathin Faqihah Yusuf	Malaysia

=== Records ===
Prior to this competition, the existing Asian and SEA Games records were as follows:

AR	China (An Xiaohong, Bai Xiaoyun, Cao Chunying, Ma Yuqin)	3:24.28	Beijing, China	13 September 1993
GR	Vietnam (Nguyễn Thị Oanh, Nguyễn Thị Thủy, Quách Thị Lan, Nguyễn Thị Huyền)	3:31.46	Singapore	11 June 2015

=== Results ===
Rank	Athlete	Final	
Rank	Athlete	Lane	Time
1st place, gold medalist(s)	Vietnam (Nguyễn Thị Oanh, Quách Thị Lan, Hoàng Thị Ngọc, Nguyễn Thị Huyền)	4	3:33.40
2nd place, silver medalist(s)	Thailand (Pornpan Hoemhuk, Atchima Eng-Chuan, Treewadee Yongphan, Supanich Poolkerd)	3	3:38.95
3rd place, bronze medalist(s)	Malaysia (Nurul Faizah Asma Mazlan, Shereen Samson Vallabuoy, Tanalaksiumy Rayer, Fathin Faqihah Yusuf)	5	3:43.31
4	Singapore (Kugapriya Chandran, Goh Chui Ling, Dipna Lim Prasad, Veronica Shanti Pereira)	6	3:47.69
5	Philippines	DNS	

== Marathon ==
Athletics – Women's marathon at the 2017 SEA Games
- Venue: Presint 3, Putrajaya
- Date: 19 August 2017
- Competitors: 6 from 4 nations

Medalists
gold medal	Mary Joy Tabal	Philippines
silver medal	Hoàng Thị Thanh	Vietnam
bronze medal	Natthaya Thanaronnawat	Thailand

=== Records ===
Prior to this competition, the existing Asian and SEA Games records were as follows:

AR	Mizuki Noguchi (JPN)	2:19:12	Berlin, Germany	25 September 2005
GR	Ruwiyati (INA)	2:34:29	Chiang Mai, Thailand	13 December 1995

=== Results ===
Rank	Athlete	Final
Rank	Athlete	Time
1st place, gold medalist(s)	Mary Joy Tabal (PHI)	2:48.26
2nd place, silver medalist(s)	Hoàng Thị Thanh (VIE)	2:55.43
3rd place, bronze medalist(s)	Natthaya Thanaronnawat (THA)	2:58.17
4	Jasmine Goh (SGP)	3:14.36
5	Lê Thị Thoa (VIE)	3:27.53
6	Rachel See Boon Lay (SGP)	3:46.41

== 10000 metres walk (track) ==
Athletics – Women's 10000m walk (track) at the 2017 SEA Games
- Venue: Bukit Jalil National Stadium, Kuala Lumpur
- Date: 23 August 2017
- Competitors: 6 from 4 nations

Medalists
gold medal	Elena Goh Ling Yin	Malaysia
silver medal	Phan Thị Bích Hà	Vietnam
bronze medal	Tanaphon Assawawongcharoen	Thailand

=== Records ===
Prior to this competition, the existing Asian and SEA Games records were as follows:

AR	—	—	—	—
GR	Yuan Yufang (MAS)	45:22.0	Bandar Seri Begawan, Brunei	9 August 1999

=== Results ===
Rank	Athlete	Final	
Rank	Athlete	Lane	Time
1st place, gold medalist(s)	Elena Goh Ling Yin (MAS)	1	52:21.50
2nd place, silver medalist(s)	Phan Thị Bích Hà (VIE)	5	52:27.78
3rd place, bronze medalist(s)	Tanaphon Assawawongcharoen (THA)	6	53:17.10
4	Nguyen Thi Khanh Quyen (VIE)	2	54:28.00
5	Than Than Soe (MYA)	3	55:28.94
6	Yuan Yufang (MAS)	4	DNF

== High jump ==
Athletics – Women's high jump at the 2017 SEA Games
- Venue: Bukit Jalil National Stadium, Kuala Lumpur
- Date: 24 August 2017
- Competitors: 5 from 5 nations

Medalists
gold medal	Dương Thị Việt Anh	Vietnam
gold medal	Michelle Sng Suat Li	Singapore
bronze medal	Yap Sean Yee	Malaysia

=== Records ===
Prior to this competition, the existing Asian and SEA Games records were as follows:

AR	Marina Aitova (KAZ)	1.99	Athens, Greece	13 July 2009
GR	Noengrothai Chaipetch (THA)	1.94	Vientiane, Laos	14 December 2009

=== Results ===
Rank	Athlete	1.60	1.65	1.70	1.75	1.79	1.83	1.86	Result
1st place, gold medalist(s)	Dương Thị Việt Anh (VIE)	–	o	o	o	o	o	xxx	1.83
1st place, gold medalist(s)	Michelle Sng Suat Li (SGP)	–	o	o	o	o	o	xxx	1.83
3rd place, bronze medalist(s)	Yap Sean Yee (MAS)	–	o	xo	xo	o	o	xxx	1.83
4	Wanida Boonwan (THA)	–	o	o	o	xo	xo	xxx	1.83
5	Nadia Anggraini (INA)	–	o	o	xo	xxx			1.75

== Pole vault ==
Athletics – Women's pole vault at the 2017 SEA Games
- Venue: Bukit Jalil National Stadium, Kuala Lumpur
- Date: 25 August 2017
- Competitors: 7 from 4 nations

Medalists
gold medal	Chayanisa Chomchuendee	Thailand
silver medal	Chuah Yu Tian	Malaysia
bronze medal	Rachel Yang	Singapore

=== Records ===
Prior to this competition, the existing Asian and SEA Games records were as follows:

AR	Li Ling (CHN)	4.70	Doha, Qatar	19 February 2016
GR	Sukanya Chomchuendee (THA)	4.21	Naypyidaw, Myanmar	15 December 2013

=== Results ===
Rank	Athlete	3.20	3.40	3.60	3.70	3.80	3.90	4.00	4.10	4.22	Result
1st place, gold medalist(s)	Chayanisa Chomchuendee (THA)	–	–	o	–	o	o	o	xo	xxx	4.10
2nd place, silver medalist(s)	Chuah Yu Tian (MAS)	–	xo	o	o	o	xxx				3.80
3rd place, bronze medalist(s)	Rachel Yang (SGP)	–	xo	o	xxx						3.60
4	Suttikan Khammun (THA)	o	o	xxx							3.40
5	Emily Jean Obiena (PHI)	xo	o	xxx							3.40
6	Riezel Buenaventura (PHI)	–	xo	xxx							3.40
7	Puteri Nur Adillah (MAS)	xxo	xxx								3.20

== Long jump ==
Athletics – Women's long jump at the 2017 SEA Games
- Venue: Bukit Jalil National Stadium, Kuala Lumpur
- Date: 25 August 2017
- Competitors: 10 from 6 nations

Medalists
gold medal	Bùi Thị Thu Thảo	Vietnam
silver medal	Maria Natalia Londa	Indonesia
bronze medal	Marestella Sunang	Philippines

=== Records ===
Prior to this competition, the existing Asian and SEA Games records were as follows:

AR	Yao Weili (CHN)	7.01	Jinan, China	5 June 1993
GR	Marestella Sunang (PHI)	6.71	Palembang, Indonesia	12 November 2011

=== Results ===
Rank	Athlete	#1	#2	#3	#4	#5	#6	Result
1st place, gold medalist(s)	Bùi Thị Thu Thảo (VIE)	6.64	6.61	6.53	6.68	X	X	6.68
2nd place, silver medalist(s)	Maria Natalia Londa (INA)	6.18	6.17	6.21	6.45	X	6.47	6.47
3rd place, bronze medalist(s)	Marestella Sunang (PHI)	X	6.45	X	X	6.41	X	6.45
4	Nguyễn Thị Trúc Mai (VIE)	6.11	6.17	6.26	X	X	X	6.26
5	Katherine Khay Santos (PHI)	6.12	6.18	6.07	X	X	6.16	6.18
6	Parinya Chuaimaroeng (THA)	5.94	6.04	5.96	6.02	X	5.92	6.04
7	Shahidatun Nadia (MAS)	5.62	5.99	5.77	X	5.98	X	5.99
8	Laenly Phoutthavong (LAO)	5.75	5.67	5.58	5.51	5.52	5.73	5.75
9	Kirthana Ramasamy (MAS)	5.47	5.66	5.66	did not advance			5.66
10	Kotchakorn Khamrueangsri (THA)	5.49	5.48	5.36	did not advance			5.49

== Triple jump ==
Athletics – Women's triple jump at the 2017 SEA Games
- Venue: Bukit Jalil National Stadium, Kuala Lumpur
- Date: 23 August 2017
- Competitors: 7 from 5 nations

Medalists
gold medal	Vũ Thị Mến	Vietnam
silver medal	Maria Natalia Londa	Indonesia
bronze medal	Parinya Chuaimaroeng	Thailand

=== Records ===
Prior to this competition, the existing Asian and SEA Games records were as follows:

AR	Olga Rypakova (KAZ)	15.25	Split, Croatia	4 September 2010
GR	Maria Natalia Londa (INA)	14.17	Naypyidaw, Myanmar	17 December 2013

=== Results ===
Rank	Athlete	#1	#2	#3	#4	#5	#6	Result
1st place, gold medalist(s)	Vũ Thị Mến (VIE)	14.15	13.50	X	13.69	X	X	14.15
2nd place, silver medalist(s)	Maria Natalia Londa (INA)	13.26	13.44	13.41	13.52	13.19	13.44	13.52
3rd place, bronze medalist(s)	Parinya Chuaimaroeng (THA)	X	13.32	13.27	12.68	13.27	X	13.32
4	Kirthana Ramasamy (MAS)	X	13.19	X	X	13.11	12.95	13.19
5	Shahidatun Nadia (MAS)	X	X	13.02	13.13	X	X	13.13
6	Trần Huệ Hoa (VIE)	12.72	12.63	X	12.37	12.26	X	12.72
7	Laenly Phoutthavong (LAO)	X	X	12.36	12.19	X	12.00	12.36

== Shot put ==
Athletics – Women's shot put at the 2017 SEA Games
- Venue: Bukit Jalil National Stadium, Kuala Lumpur
- Date: 25 August 2017
- Competitors: 6 from 4 nations

Medalists
gold medal	Eki Febri Ekawati	Indonesia
silver medal	Areerat Intadis	Thailand
bronze medal	Sawitri Thongchao	Thailand

=== Records ===
Prior to this competition, the existing Asian and SEA Games records were as follows:

AR	Li Meisu (CHN)	21.76	Shijiazhuang, China	23 April 1988
GR	Du Xianhui (SGP)	18.20	Hanoi, Vietnam	7 December 2003

=== Results ===
Rank	Athlete	#1	#2	#3	#4	#5	#6	Result
1st place, gold medalist(s)	Eki Febri Ekawati (INA)	15.39	15.38	15.27	15.02	14.99	X	15.39
2nd place, silver medalist(s)	Areerat Intadis (THA)	14.11	14.68	14.58	15.20	14.78	15.33	15.33
3rd place, bronze medalist(s)	Sawitri Thongchao (THA)	13.43	13.63	14.26	13.66	13.88	13.50	14.26
4	Zhang Guirong (SGP)	13.33	X	X	13.42	X	X	13.42
5	Rahilah Othman (MAS)	12.68	12.86	13.10	13.12	13.13	13.13	13.13
6	Bibi Nuraishah Ishak (MAS)	12.63	12.97	12.75	13.10	12.71	X	13.10

== Discus throw ==
Athletics – Women's discus throw at the 2017 SEA Games
- Venue: Bukit Jalil National Stadium, Kuala Lumpur
- Date: 26 August 2017
- Competitors: 7 from 5 nations

Medalists
gold medal	Subenrat Insaeng	Thailand
silver medal	Choo Kang Ni	Malaysia
bronze medal	Nguyễn Thị Hồng Thương	Vietnam

=== Records ===
Prior to this competition, the existing Asian and SEA Games records were as follows:

AR	Xiao Yanling (CHN)	71.68	Beijing, China	14 March 1992
GR	Subenrat Insaeng (THA)	59.56	Singapore	12 June 2015

=== Results ===
Rank	Athlete	#1	#2	#3	#4	#5	#6	Result
1st place, gold medalist(s)	Subenrat Insaeng (THA)	X	X	45.19	48.14	53.04	55.23	55.23
2nd place, silver medalist(s)	Choo Kang Ni (MAS)	46.99	45.90	46.59	44.45	44.21	47.91	47.91
3rd place, bronze medalist(s)	Nguyễn Thị Hồng Thương (VIE)	44.64	X	45.10	X	X	X	45.10
4	Yap Jeng Tzan (MAS)	X	X	43.86	41.55	X	44.81	44.81
5	Charuwan Sroisena (THA)	39.58	44.03	41.83	41.27	X	X	44.03
6	Reah Joy Pitogo Sumalpong (PHI)	X	43.91	X	X	X	42.29	43.91
7	Mar Mar San (MYA)	39.88	39.25	X	39.00	41.02	39.94	41.02

== Hammer throw ==
Athletics – Women's hammer throw at the 2017 SEA Games
- Venue: Bukit Jalil National Stadium, Kuala Lumpur
- Date: 24 August 2017
- Competitors: 5 from 3 nations

Medalists
gold medal	Grace Wong Xiu Mei	Malaysia
silver medal	Mingkamon Koomphon	Thailand
bronze medal	Panwat Gimsrang	Thailand

=== Records ===
Prior to this competition, the existing Asian and SEA Games records were as follows:

AR	Wang Zheng (CHN)	77.68	Chengdu, China	29 March 2014
GR	Mingkamon Koomphon (THA)	56.57	Singapore	9 June 2015

=== Results ===
Rank	Athlete	#1	#2	#3	#4	#5	#6	Result
1st place, gold medalist(s)	Grace Wong Xiu Mei (MAS)	59.24	58.30	X	58.05	X	X	59.24 GR
2nd place, silver medalist(s)	Mingkamon Koomphon (THA)	56.15	54.49	55.17	56.15	X	X	56.15
3rd place, bronze medalist(s)	Panwat Gimsrang (THA)	53.89	54.56	54.88	49.20	53.33	56.06	56.06
4	Nurfazira Jalaludin (MAS)	X	X	48.31	53.37	X	50.49	53.37
5	M Soe Zar (MYA)	44.90	43.52	45.52	X	X	43.37	45.52

== Javelin throw ==
Athletics – Women's javelin throw at the 2017 SEA Games
- Venue: Bukit Jalil National Stadium, Kuala Lumpur
- Date: 22 August 2017
- Competitors: 6 from 4 nations

Medalists
gold medal	Natta Nachan	Thailand
silver medal	Bùi Thị Xuân	Vietnam
bronze medal	Evalyn Palabrica	Philippines

=== Records ===
Prior to this competition, the existing Asian and SEA Games records were as follows:

AR	Lü Huihui (CHN)	67.59	London, England	6 August 2017
GR	Buoban Pamang (THA)	55.97	Nakhon Ratchasima, Thailand	7 December 2007

=== Results ===
Rank	Athlete	#1	#2	#3	#4	#5	#6	Result
1st place, gold medalist(s)	Natta Nachan (THA)	49.97	X	48.51	45.85	52.87	55.04	55.04
2nd place, silver medalist(s)	Bùi Thị Xuân (VIE)	52.50	52.50	52.50	51.26	51.50	51.92	52.50
3rd place, bronze medalist(s)	Evalyn Palabrica (PHI)	44.78	45.49	47.21	46.15	46.14	X	47.21
4	Rosie Villarito (PHI)	X	X	X	X	47.08	46.23	47.08
5	Jariya Wichaidit (THA)	40.61	X	X	46.13	43.65	X	46.13
6	Pavithraa Devi Jayaindraan (MAS)	X	X	41.05	X	X	37.00	41.05

== Heptathlon ==
Athletics – Women's heptathlon at the 2017 SEA Games
- Venue: Bukit Jalil National Stadium, Kuala Lumpur
- Date: 24–25 August 2017
- Competitors: 6 from 5 nations

Medalists
gold medal	Sunisa Khotseemueang	Thailand
silver medal	Emilia Nova	Indonesia
bronze medal	Wassana Winatho	Thailand

=== Records ===
Prior to this competition, the existing Asian and SEA Games records were as follows:

AR	Ghada Shouaa (SYR)	6942 pts	Götzis, Austria	26 May 1996
GR	Wassana Winatho (THA)	5889 pts	Nakhon Ratchasima, Thailand	11 December 2007

=== Results ===
Key

The highest mark recorded in each event is highlighted in yellow.

Rank	Athlete	Points	100m h	HJ	SP	200m	LJ	JT	800m
1st place, gold medalist(s)	Sunisa Khotseemueang (THA)	5430	830; 15.09 s	903; 1.74 m	657; 11.94 m	784; 26.15 s	828; 5.93 m	661; 39.68 m	767; 2:24.25
2nd place, silver medalist(s)	Emilia Nova (INA)	5386	1039; 13.58 s	759; 1.62 m	585; 10.84 m	885; 25.02 s	774; 5.75 m	574; 35.10 m	770; 2:24.03
3rd place, bronze medalist(s)	Wassana Winatho (THA)	5288	963; 14.11 s	830; 1.68 m	593; 10.97 m	807; 25.89 s	747; 5.66 m	564; 34.60 m	784; 2:22.97
4	Norliyana Kamaruddin (MAS)	5247	838; 15.03 s	978; 1.80 m	619; 11.36 m	750; 26.55 s	726; 5.59 m	562; 34.50 m	774; 2:23.67
5	Manivanh Chanthavong (LAO)	4013	882; 14.70 s	689; 1.56 m	417; 8.28 m	679; 27.40 s	581; 5.08 m	240; 17.36 m	525; 2:44.29
6	Narcisa Atienza (PHI)	3570	770; 15.55 s	795; 1.65 m	659; 11.97 m	632; 27.99 s	0 NM	714; 42.41 m	0 DNS
