= Athletics at the 2013 SEA Games – Women's 4 × 400 metres relay =

The women's 4 × 400 metres relay at the 2013 SEA Games, the athletics was held in Naypyidaw, Myanmar. The track and field events took place at the Wunna Theikdi Stadiumon December 19.

== Schedule ==
All times are Myanmar Standard Time (UTC+06:30)

Date	Time	Event
Thursday, 19 December 2013	16:05	Final

== Records ==
Prior to this competition, the existing world, Asian, and Southeast Asian Games records were as follows.

World Record	Soviet Union	3:15.17	Seoul, South Korea	1 October 1988
Asian Record	China	3:24.28	Beijing, China	13 September 1993
Games Record	Thailand	3:35.53	Manila, Philippines	3 December 1991

== Results ==
Legend

- DSQ — Disqualified

Rank	Lane	Nation	Competitors	Time	Notes
1st place, gold medalist(s)	3	Thailand (THA)	Phatsorn Jaksuninkorn, Atchima Engchuan, Pornpan Hoemhuk, Treewadee Yongphan	3:36.58	
2nd place, silver medalist(s)	6	Vietnam (VIE)	Quach Thi Lan, Nguyễn Thị Thúy, Nguyễn Thị Thúy, Nguyen Thi Oanh	3:36.92	NR
3rd place, bronze medalist(s)	4	Myanmar (MYA)	Su Kyi Aung, Yin Yin Khine, Aye Aye Than, Swe Li Myint	3:42.88	
4	2	Singapore (SIN)	Wendy Enn, Veronica Shanti Pereira, T Piriyah, Dipna Lim Prasad	3:44.80	
5	5	Malaysia (MAS)	Siti Nur Afiqah Abdul Razak, Nurulassikin Mohd Rasid, Fatin Faqihah Mohd Yusuf, Nurul Faizah Asma Mazlan	3:45.10	
