= Athletics at the 2013 SEA Games – Women's 800 metres =

The women's 800 metres, at the 2013 SEA Games, was an athletics event held in Naypyidaw, Myanmar. The track and field events took place at the Wunna Theikdi Stadiumon December 17.

== Schedule ==
All times are Myanmar Standard Time (UTC+06:30)

Date	Time	Event
Tuesday, 17 December 2013	15:50	Final

== Records ==
Prior to this competition, the existing world, Asian, and Southeast Asian Games records were as follows.

World Record	Jarmila Kratochvílová (TCH)	1:53.28	Munich, West Germany	26 July 1983
Asian Record	Liu Dong (CHN)	1:55.54	Beijing, China	9 September 1993
Games Record	Hang Truong Thanh (VIE)	2:02.39	Nakhon Ratchasima, Thailand	8 December 2007

== Results ==
Legend

Rank	Lane	Athlete	Time	Notes
1st place, gold medalist(s)	3	Do Thi Thao (VIE)	02:05.52	
2nd place, silver medalist(s)	5	Vu Thi Ly (VIE)	02:07.25	
3rd place, bronze medalist(s)	4	Swe Li Myint (MYA)	02:08.20	
4	2	Yin Yin Khine (MYA)	02:12.39	
