= Athletics at the 2015 SEA Games – Women's marathon =

Athletics – Women's marathon at the 2015 SEA Games
- Venue: Kallang Practice Track
- Date: 7 June 2015
- Competitors: 10 from 6 nations

Medalists
gold medal	Natthaya Thanaronnawat	Thailand
silver medal	Mary Joy Tabal	Philippines
bronze medal	Hoàng Thị Thanh	Vietnam

The women's marathon competition of the athletics event at the 2015 SEA Games was held on 7 June at the Kallang Practice Track in Singapore.

== Records ==
Prior to this competition, the existing Asian and Games records were as follows:

Asian record	Noguchi Mizuki (JPN)	2:19:12	Berlin, Germany	25 September 2005
Games record	Ruwiyati (INA)	2:34:29	Chiang Mai, Thailand	13 December 1995

== Schedule ==
All times are Singapore Standard Time (UTC+08:00)

Date	Time	Event
Sunday, 7 June 2015	06:00	Final

== Results ==
KEY:	GR	Games record	NR	National record	PB	Personal best	SB	Seasonal best	DNF	Did not finish

Source: Final Results

Rank	Athletes	Time	Notes
1st place, gold medalist(s)	Natthaya Thanaronnawat (THA)	3:03:25	
2nd place, silver medalist(s)	Mary Joy Tabal (PHI)	3:04:39	
3rd place, bronze medalist(s)	Hoàng Thị Thanh (VIE)	3:07:14	
4	Lâm Thị Thủy (VIE)	3:14:10	
5	Aye Myint Myint (MYA)	3:16:02	
6	See Boon Lay Rachel (SIN)	3:18:14	
7	Natercia Ximenes Maia (TLS)	3:23:38	PB
8	Neo Jie Shi (SIN)	3:35:54	
	Juventina Napoleao (TLS)	—	DNF
	Jane Vongvorachoti (THA)	—	DNF
