= 2019 European Athletics Indoor Championships – Women's 400 metres =

Women's 400 metres at the 2019 European Athletics Indoor Championships
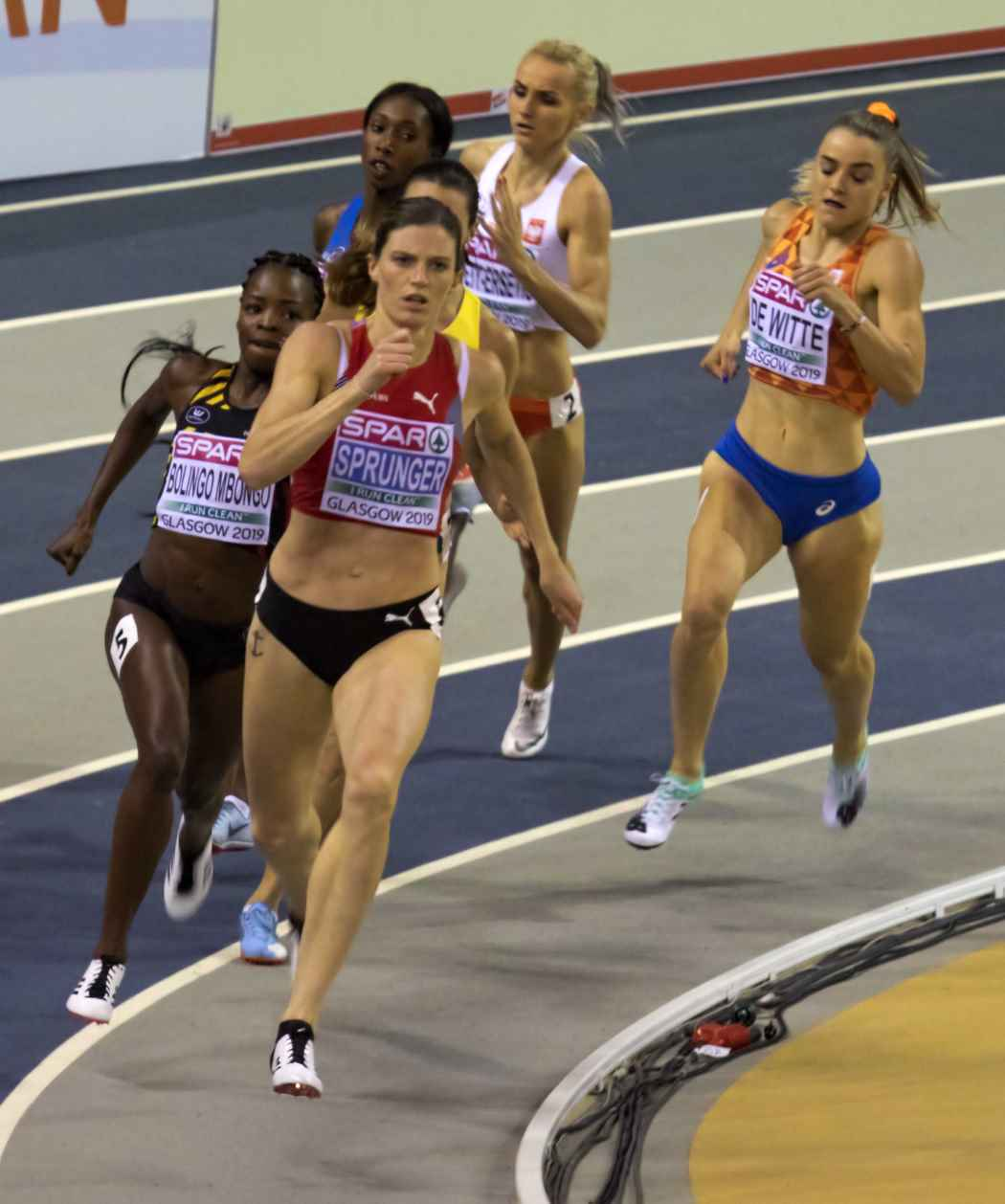
- Medalists Léa Sprunger (center), Cynthia Bolingo Mbongo (leftmost), and Lisanne de Witte (rightmost) in the final
- Venue: Emirates Arena
- Location: Glasgow, United Kingdom
- Dates: 1 March 2019 (round 1 and semi-finals); 2 March 2019 (final)
- Competitors: 37 from 25 nations
- Winning time: 51.61 s i

Medalists
gold medal	Léa Sprunger	Switzerland
silver medal	Cynthia Bolingo Mbongo	Belgium
bronze medal	Lisanne de Witte	Netherlands

The women's 400 metres at the 2019 European Athletics Indoor Championships took place in three rounds at the Emirates Arena in Glasgow, United Kingdom, on 1 and 2 March 2019.

On 1 March, round 1 was held in the morning, where a total of 37 athletes of 25 nations competed. Cynthia Bolingo Mbongo of Belgium set a national record of 52.60 seconds and Gunta Vaičule of Latvia set a national record of 52.66 seconds. Eighteen athletes qualified for the semi-finals. On 1 March, the semi-finals were held in the evening. Agnė Šerkšnienė of Lithuania set a national record of 52.33 seconds and Bolingo Mbongo further improved her Belgian record to 52.37 seconds. Six athletes qualified for the final.

On 2 March, the final was held in the evening. The race was won by Léa Sprunger of Switzerland in a world leading time of 51.61 seconds, followed by Bolingo Mbongo in 51.62 seconds, another improvement of her Belgian record, and Lisanne de Witte of the Netherlands in a personal best time of 52.34 seconds.

== Background ==
Records before 2019 European Athletics Indoor Championships
Record	Athlete (nation)	Time	Location	Date
World record	Jarmila Kratochvílová (TCH)	49.59	Milan, Italy	7 March 1982
European record	Jarmila Kratochvílová (TCH)	49.59	Milan, Italy	7 March 1982
Championship record	Jarmila Kratochvílová (TCH)	49.59	Milan, Italy	7 March 1982
World Leading	Antonina Krivoshapka (RUS)	51.86	Moscow, Russia	3 February 2019
European Leading	Antonina Krivoshapka (RUS)	51.86	Moscow, Russia	3 February 2019

== Qualification ==
Athletes could qualify for the 400 metres from 1 January 2018 to 21 February 2019 by reaching the entry standard of 53.90 s indoor and 52.75 s outdoor. If a nation didn't have any qualified athletes, it could enter one unqualified athlete.

== Rounds ==
=== Round 1 ===
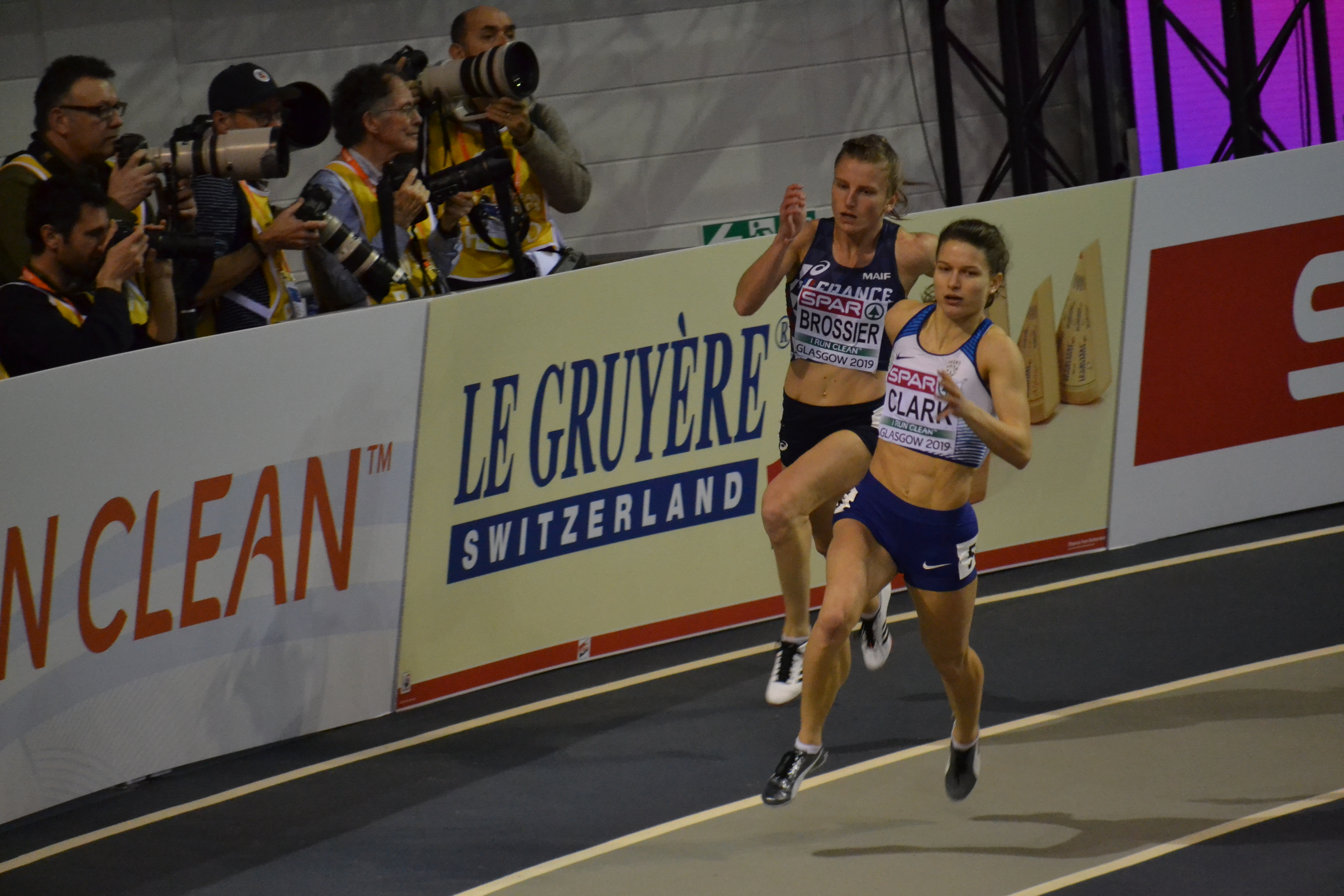
Amandine Brossier and Zoey Clark during the first heat of round 1

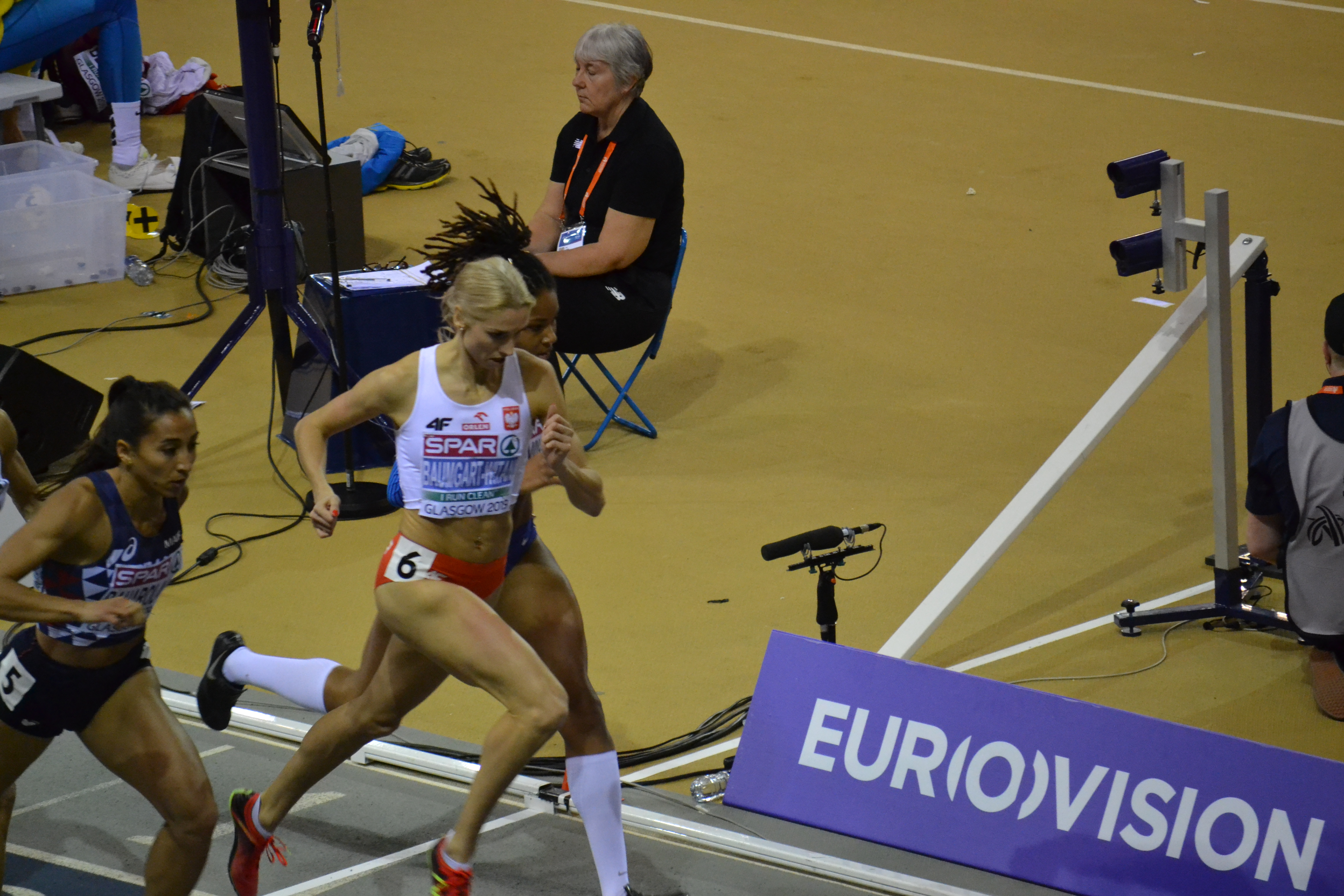
Agnès Raharolahy, Iga Baumgart-Witan, and Amber Anning during the second heat of round 1

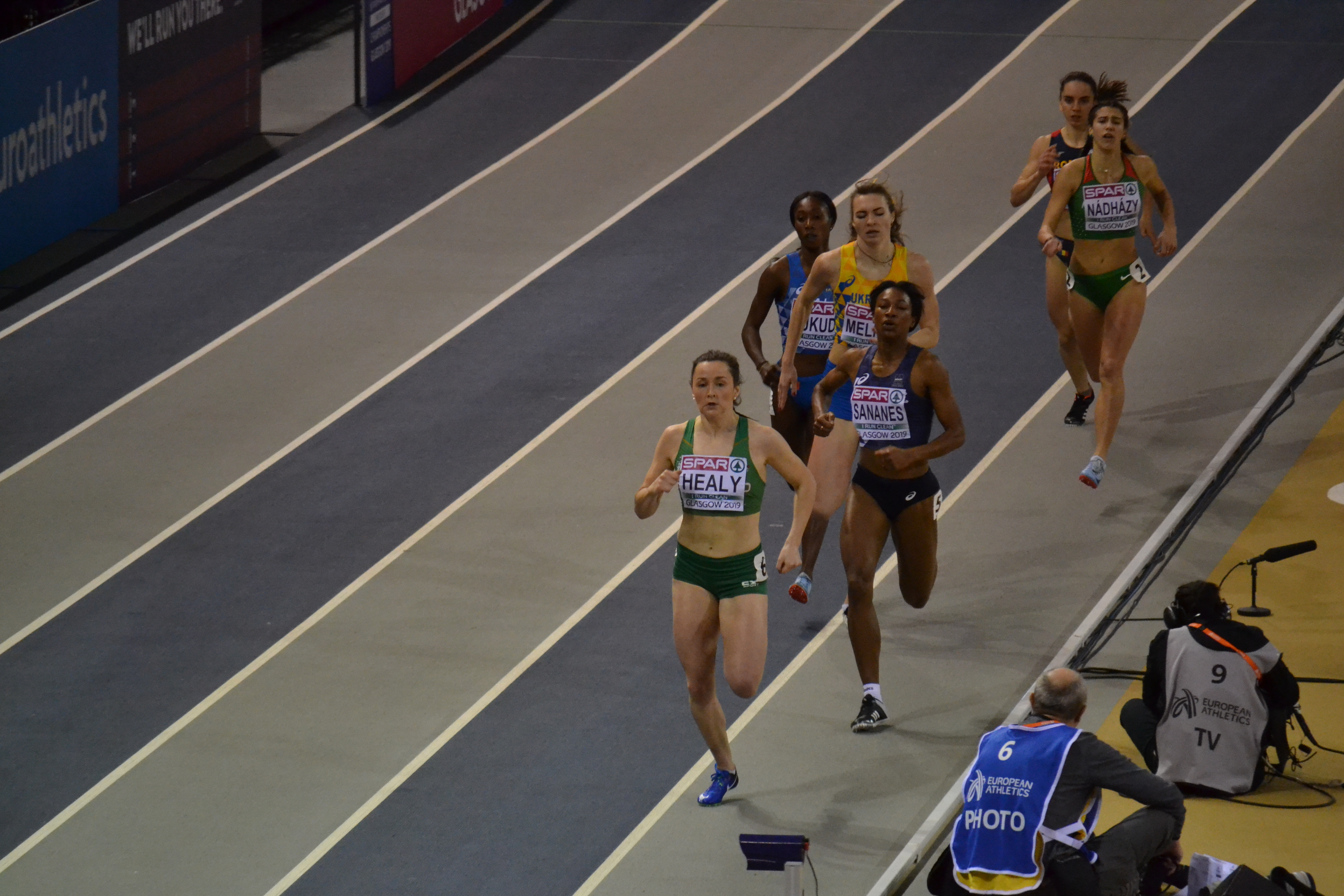
Phil Healy ahead of Déborah Sananes and other athletes during the third heat of round 1

The seven heats of the first round were held on 1 March, starting at 10:20 in the morning. Of the 37 competitors, the first two athletes in each heat (Q) and the next four fastest (q) qualified for the semi-finals. In the fifth heat, Gunta Vaičule of Latvia set a national record (NR) of 52.66 s. In the seventh heat, Cynthia Bolingo Mbongo of Belgium set a national record of 52.60 s.

Results of round 1
Rank	Heat	Athlete	Nationality	Time	Note
1	5	Léa Sprunger	Switzerland	52.46	Q
2	7	Lisanne de Witte	Netherlands	52.56	Q, SB
3	7	Cynthia Bolingo Mbongo	Belgium	52.60	Q, NR
4	4	Justyna Święty-Ersetic	Poland	52.64	Q
5	5	Gunta Vaičule	Latvia	52.66	Q, NR
6	5	Laura Bueno	Spain	52.67	q, PB
7	4	Anna Ryzhykova	Ukraine	52.73	Q, PB
8	4	Ayomide Folorunso	Italy	52.75	q
9	7	Eilidh Doyle	Great Britain	52.81	q
10	3	Raphaela Boaheng Lukudo	Italy	52.99	Q, SB
11	6	Polina Miller	Authorised Neutral Athletes	53.03	Q, PB
12	3	Déborah Sananes	France	53.05	Q
13	3	Phil Healy	(Republic of Ireland) Ireland	53.13	q
14	6	Agnė Šerkšnienė	Lithuania	53.14	Q
15	2	Iga Baumgart-Witan	Poland	53.17	Q
16	2	Agnès Raharolahy	France	53.21	Q
17	2	Amber Anning	Great Britain	53.26	
18	6	Lada Vondrová	Czech Republic	53.29	
19	2	Nadine Gonska	Germany	53.38	
20	3	Tetyana Melnyk	Ukraine	53.39	
21	1	Amandine Brossier	France	53.40	Q
22	6	Cátia Azevedo	Portugal	53.43	SB
23	7	Aauri Lorena Bokesa	Spain	53.45	
24	6	Eleni Artymata	Cyprus	53.49	PB
25	1	Anita Horvat	Slovenia	53.53	Q
26	7	Irini Vasiliou	Greece	53.66	
27	1	Kateryna Klymyuk	Ukraine	53.68	PB
28	1	Maja Ćirić	Serbia	53.73	
29	4	Yasmin Giger	Switzerland	53.84	
30	1	Zoey Clark	Great Britain	53.85	
31	3	Andrea Miklos	Romania	53.87	SB
32	3	Evelín Nádházy	Hungary	53.90	
33	5	Matilda Hellqvist	Sweden	53.93	PB
34	2	Sophie Becker	(Republic of Ireland) Ireland	53.99	
35	5	Iveta Putalová	Slovakia	54.19	
36	4	Susanne Walli	Austria	54.69	
37	1	Salma Paralluelo	Spain	55.30	

=== Semi-finals ===
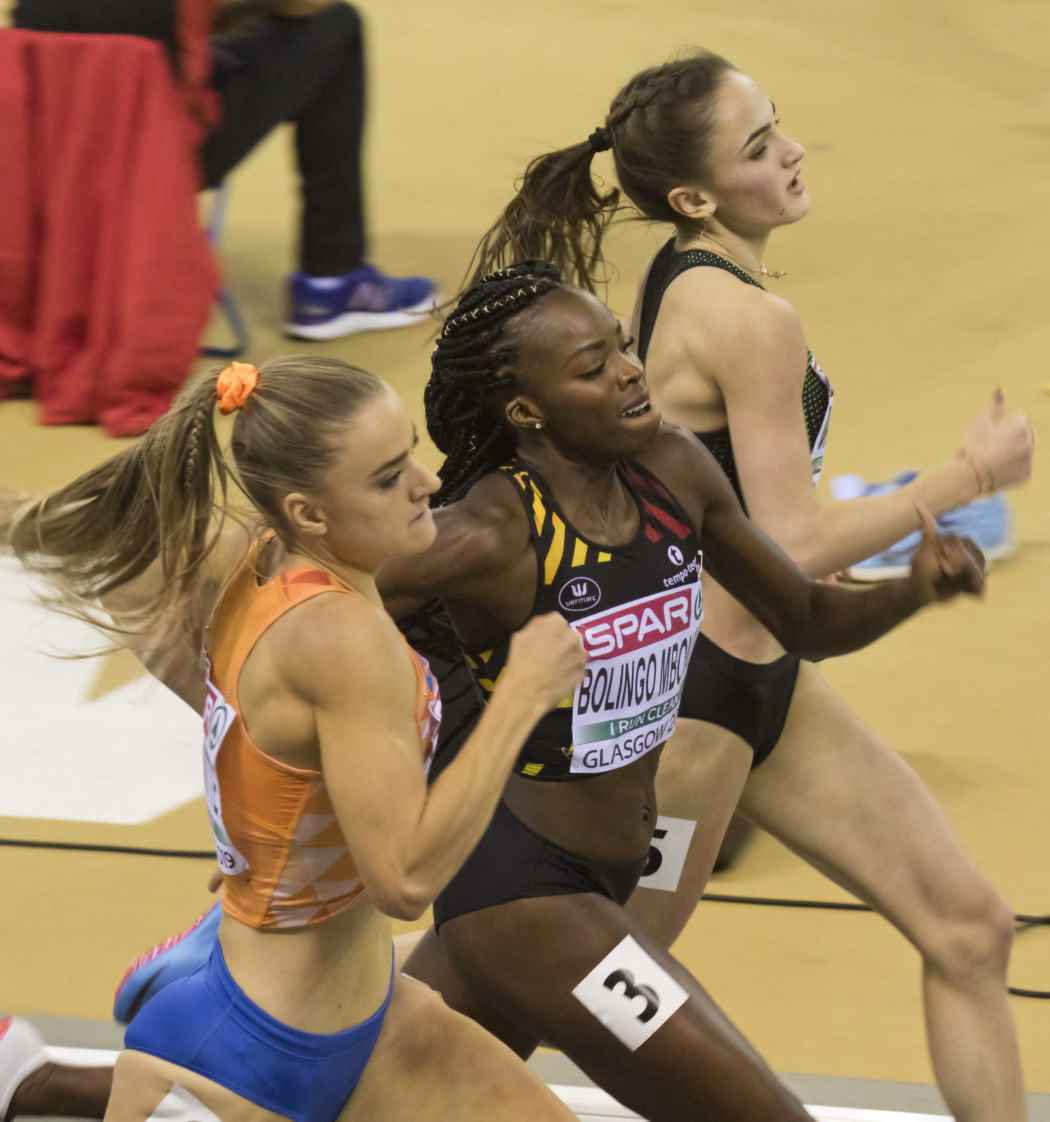
Lisanne de Witte, Cynthia Bolingo Mbongo, and Polina Miller near the finish of the third heat of the semi-finals

The three heats of the semi-finals were held on 1 March, starting at 21:00 in the evening. Of the eighteen competitors, the first two athletes in each heat (Q) advanced to the final. In the second heat, Agnė Šerkšnienė of Lithuania set a national record (NR) of 52.33 s. In the third heat, Cynthia Bolingo Mbongo of Belgium broke her own national record from the first round in a new time of 52.37 s.

Results of the semi-finals
Rank	Heat	Athlete	Nationality	Time	Note
1	2	Léa Sprunger	Switzerland	51.90	Q
2	2	Agnė Šerkšnienė	Lithuania	52.33	Q, NR
3	3	Cynthia Bolingo Mbongo	Belgium	52.37	Q, NR
4	3	Lisanne de Witte	Netherlands	52.38	Q, PB
5	3	Polina Miller	Authorised Neutral Athletes	52.46	PB
6	1	Raphaela Boaheng Lukudo	Italy	52.80	Q, PB
7	1	Justyna Święty-Ersetic	Poland	52.85	Q
8	1	Laura Bueno	Spain	53.05	
9	1	Anna Ryzhykova	Ukraine	53.22	
10	3	Eilidh Doyle	Great Britain	53.28	
11	3	Déborah Sananes	France	53.34	
12	3	Anita Horvat	Slovenia	53.37	
13	1	Agnès Raharolahy	France	53.43	
14	1	Gunta Vaičule	Latvia	53.53	
15	2	Phil Healy	(Republic of Ireland) Ireland	53.65	
16	2	Iga Baumgart-Witan	Poland	53.83	
17	2	Amandine Brossier	France	54.56	
18	2	Ayomide Folorunso	Italy	57.96	

=== Final ===
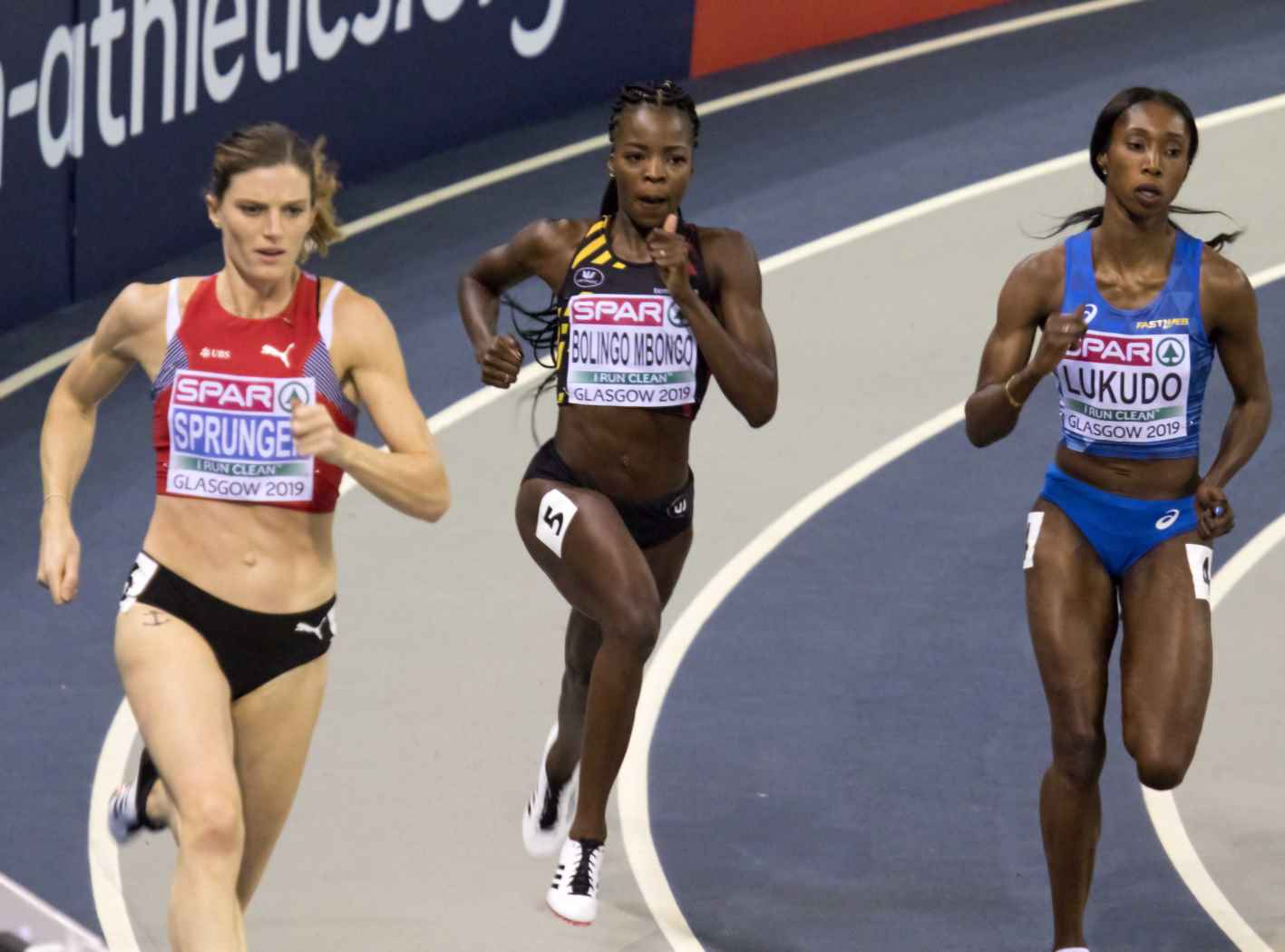
Léa Sprunger (left), Cynthia Bolingo Mbongo (center), and Raphaela Boaheng Lukudo (right) in the final

The final was held on 2 March at 20:22 in the evening. The race was won by Léa Sprunger of Switzerland in a world leading time (WL) of 51.61 s, followed by silver medalist Cynthia Bolingo Mbongo of Belgium who broke her national record (NR) from the semi-finals in 51.62 s and bronze medalist Lisanne de Witte of the Netherlands in a personal best time (PB) of 52.34 s.

Results of the final
Rank	Athlete	Nationality	Time	Note
1st place, gold medalist(s)	Léa Sprunger	Switzerland	51.61	WL
2nd place, silver medalist(s)	Cynthia Bolingo Mbongo	Belgium	51.62	NR
3rd place, bronze medalist(s)	Lisanne de Witte	Netherlands	52.34	PB
4	Agnė Šerkšnienė	Lithuania	52.40	
5	Raphaela Boaheng Lukudo	Italy	52.48	PB
6	Justyna Święty-Ersetic	Poland	52.64	
