= Déborah Sananes =

French sprinter

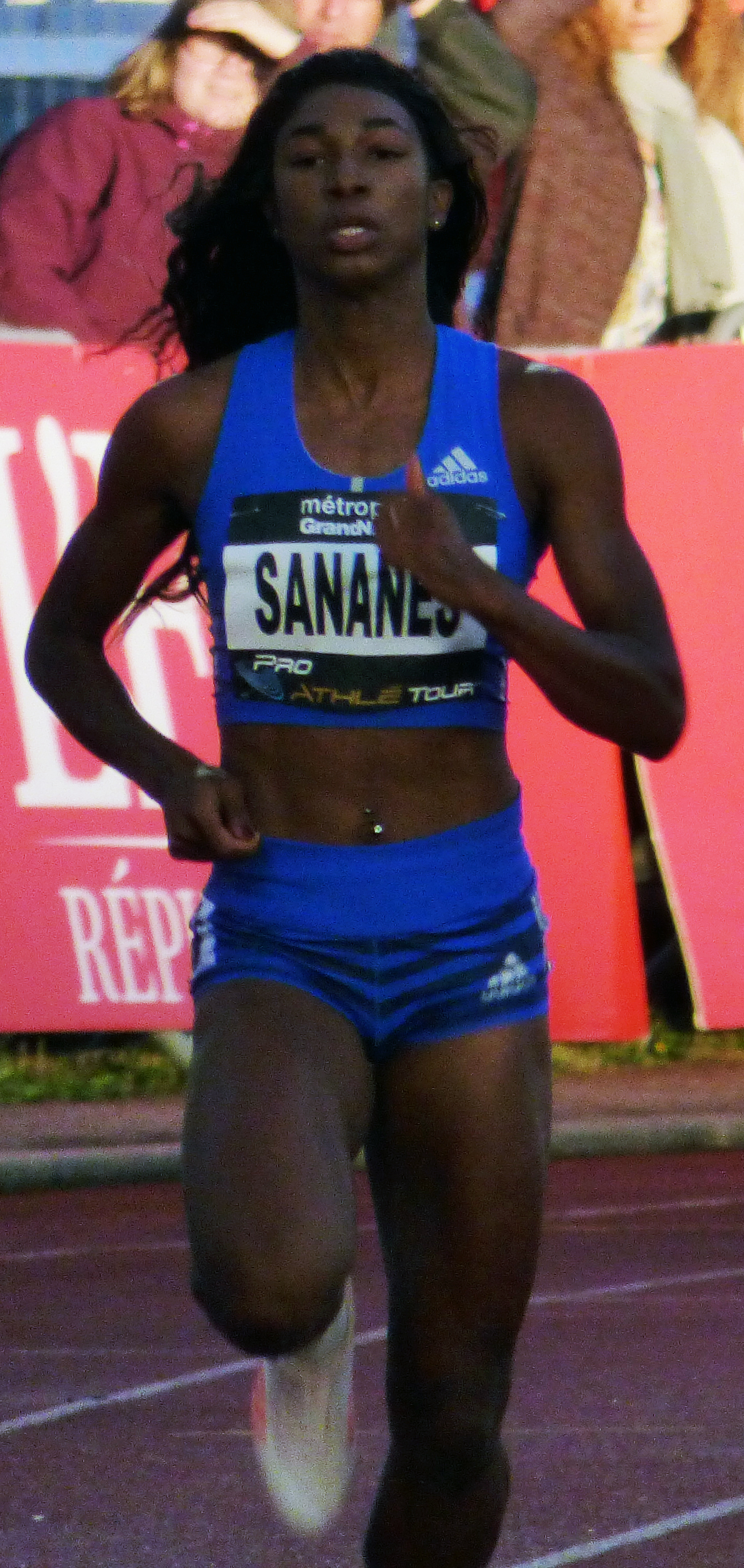

Personal information
- Nationality: France
- Born: 26 October 1995 (age 30) Treichville, Côte d'Ivoire
- Height: 1.71 m (5 ft 7 in)
- Weight: 57 kg (126 lb)

Sport
- Event(s): 200 m, 400 m
- Club: E.A. Bourg-en-Bresse
Medal record
Women's athletics
Representing France
European Junior Championships
Silver medal – second place	2013 Rieti	4 × 100 m relay
European Team Championships
Silver medal – second place	2015 Cheboksary	4 × 400 m relay

Déborah Sananes (born 26 October 1995) is a French athlete, specialising in the sprinting events.

She was born in Treichville, Ivory Coast. Running for club EA Bourg-en-Bresse, Sananes became the youth champion of France in the 400 metres in 2012 and junior champion of France in 2013.

She won the title for 200 meters at the 2014 Indoor French championships in 23.91 seconds

== International competitions ==
Year	Competition	Venue	Position	Event	Notes
2013	European Junior Championships	Rieti, Italy	2nd	4 × 100 m relay	44.00
2015	European Team Championships	Cheboksary, Russia	2nd	4 × 400 m relay	3:28.84
2017	European Indoor Championships	Belgrade, Serbia	17th (sf)	400 m	55.30
2017	European Indoor Championships	Belgrade, Serbia	5th	4 × 400 m relay	3:33.61
2017	World Relays	Nassau, Bahamas	8th	4 × 400 m relay	3:35.03
2017	European U23 Championships	Bydgoszcz, Poland	8th	400 m	54.25
2017	European U23 Championships	Bydgoszcz, Poland	7th	4 × 400 m relay	3:36.41
2017	World Championships	London, United Kingdom	31st (h)	400 m	52.50
2017	World Championships	London, United Kingdom	4th	4 × 400 m relay	3:26.56
2018	Mediterranean Games	Tarragona, Spain	4th	400 m	52.26
2018	European Championships	Berlin, Germany	2nd	4 × 400 m relay	3:27.17
2019	European Indoor Championships	Glasgow, United Kingdom	11th (sf)	400 m	53.34
2019	European Indoor Championships	Glasgow, United Kingdom	4th	4 × 400 m relay	3:32.12
2019	World Relays	Yokohama, Japan	8th (h)	4 × 400 m relay	3:29.89
2019	World Championships	Doha, Qatar	19th (sf)	400 m	52.24
2019	World Championships	Doha, Qatar	12th (h)	4 × 400 m relay	3:29.66

== National titles ==
- French Indoor Athletics Championships
  - 200 metres: 2014

== Personal records ==
Event	Performance	Location	Date
200 m	23.79 s	Bonneuil-sur-Marne	7 June 2013
400 m	52.09 s	Valence, France	24 May 2015
