= 2017 European Athletics U23 Championships – Women's 400 metres =

The women's 400 metres event at the 2017 European Athletics U23 Championships was held in Bydgoszcz, Poland, at Zdzisław Krzyszkowiak Stadium on 14 and 15 July.

== Medalists ==
Gold	Gunta Latiševa-Čudare; Latvia
Silver	Laura Müller; Germany
Bronze	Laura de Witte; Netherlands

== Results ==
=== Heats ===
14 July

Qualification rule: First 2 (Q) and the next 2 fastest (q) qualified for the final.

Rank	Heat	Name	Nationality	Time	Notes
1	1	Gunta Latiševa-Čudare	Latvia	51.80	Q, EL
2	2	Anita Horvat	Slovenia	51.94	Q, NR
3	1	Laura de Witte	Netherlands	52.15	Q, NU23R
4	1	Laura Müller	Germany	52.32	q
5	3	Laviai Nielsen	Great Britain	52.80	Q
6	2	Modesta Morauskaitė	Lithuania	52.81	Q, PB
7	2	Dominika Muraszewska	Poland	52.88	q, PB
8	2	Kateryna Klymyuk	Ukraine	52.90	
9	3	Déborah Sananes	France	52.96	Q
10	3	Adrianna Janowicz	Poland	53.07	PB
11	2	Evelin Nádházy	Hungary	53.22	PB
12	3	Eva Hovenkamp	Netherlands	53.25	
13	1	Alexandra Troiani	Italy	53.47	PB
14	3	Ylenia Vitale	Italy	53.58	
15	1	Mariola Karaś	Poland	53.78	
16	2	Susanne Walli	Austria	53.94	SB
17	1	Despina Mourta	Greece	54.02	
18	2	Sara Dorthea Jensen	Norway	54.06	SB
19	3	Helena Jiranová	Czech Republic	54.20	
20	1	Jenna Bromell	Ireland	54.34	
21	2	Virginia Troiani	Italy	54.44	
22	3	Maja Pogorevc	Slovenia	54.59	
23	1	Anja Benko	Slovenia	54.99	
24	3	Sophie Becker	Ireland	54.99	
25	3	Vijona Kryeziu	Kosovo	57.53	SB

=== Final ===
15 July

Rank	Lane	Name	Nationality	Time	Notes
1st place, gold medalist(s)	4	Gunta Latiševa-Čudare	Latvia	52.00	
2nd place, silver medalist(s)	3	Laura Müller	Germany	52.42	
3rd place, bronze medalist(s)	5	Laura de Witte	Netherlands	52.51	
4	7	Anita Horvat	Slovenia	53.06	
5	6	Laviai Nielsen	Great Britain	53.18	
6	2	Dominika Muraszewska	Poland	53.62	
7	9	Modesta Morauskaitė	Lithuania	54.06	
8	8	Déborah Sananes	France	54.25	
