= Laura Bueno =

Spanish sprinter (born 1993)

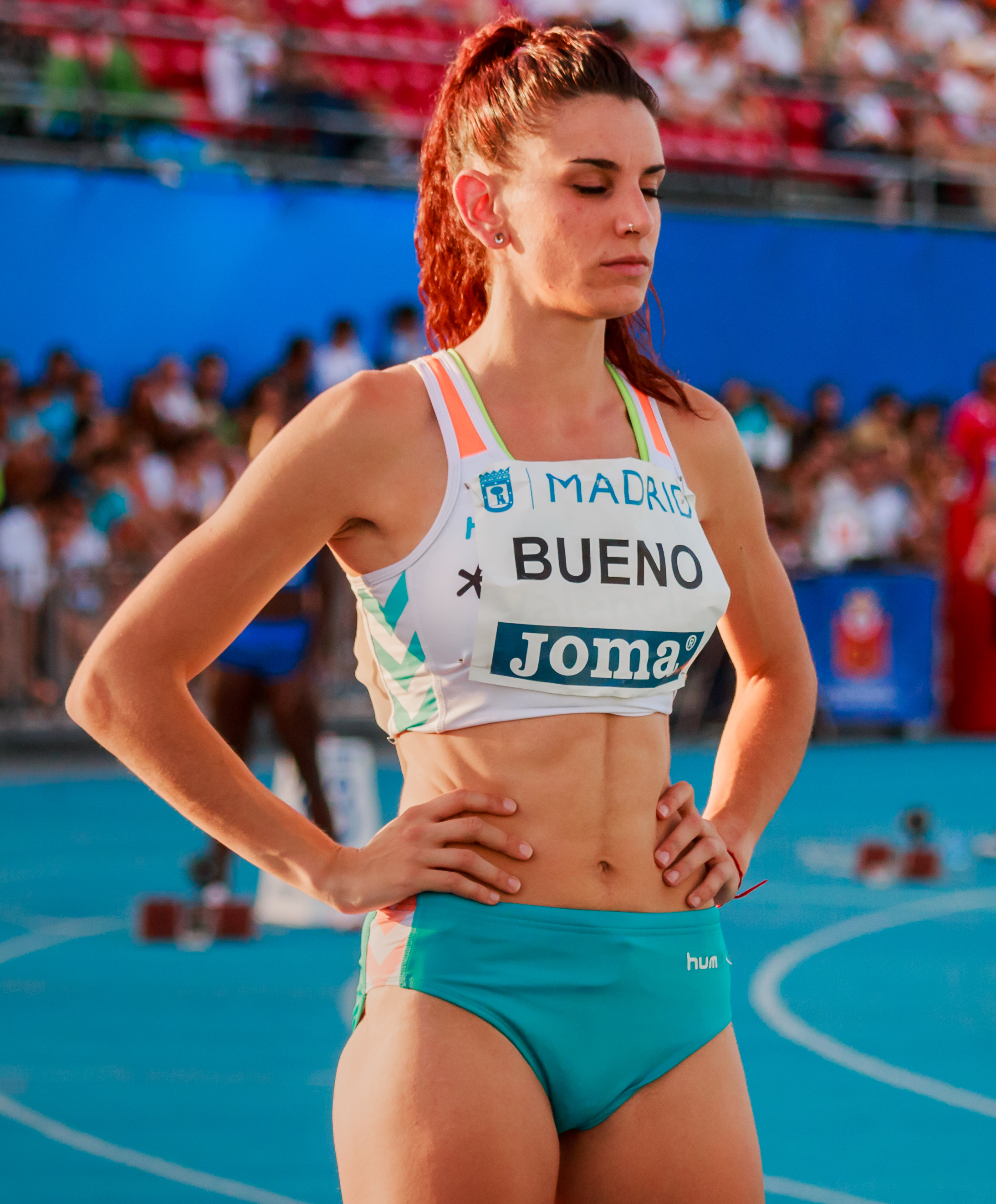
- Bueno in 2017

Personal information
- Full name: Laura María Bueno Fernández
- Nationality: Spanish
- Born: 25 May 1993 (age 32) Granada, Spain
- Height: 1.72 m (5 ft 8 in)
- Weight: 61 kg (134 lb)

Sport
- Sport: Athletics
- Event: 400 metres
- Club: A.D. Marathon (2014–2016); Valencia Esports (2017–)
- Coached by: Jesús Montiel

Laura María Bueno Fernández (born 25 May 1993) is a Spanish sprinter specialising in the 400 metres. She represented her country at the 2021 World Athletics Relays – Women's 4 × 400 metres relay. Laura Bueno is the captain of the Spanish women's 4x400 relay team.

== International competitions ==
| Year | Competition | Venue | Position | Event | Notes |
Representing Spain
| 2016 | Ibero-American Championships | Rio de Janeiro, Brazil | 2nd | 4 × 400 m relay | 3:36.16 |
| 2016 | European Championships | Amsterdam, Netherlands | 14th (h) | 400 m | 54.01 |
| 2016 | European Championships | Amsterdam, Netherlands | 14th (h) | 4 × 400 m relay | 3:33.57 |
| 2017 | European Indoor Championships | Belgrade, Serbia | 21st (h) | 400 m | 54.21 |
| 2018 | World Indoor Championships | Birmingham, United Kingdom | 25th (h) | 400 m | 53.66 |
| 2018 | Mediterranean Games | Tarragona, Spain | 9th (h) | 400 m | 53.15 |
| 2018 | European Championships | Berlin, Germany | 22nd (sf) | 400 m | 52.46 |
| 2018 | European Championships | Berlin, Germany | 11th (h) | 4 × 400 m relay | 3:33.18 |
| 2018 | Ibero-American Championships | Trujillo, Peru | 3rd | 400 m | 52.88 |
| 2018 | Ibero-American Championships | Trujillo, Peru | 3rd | 4 × 400 m relay | 3:38.32 |
| 2019 | European Indoor Championships | Glasgow, United Kingdom | 8th (sf) | 400 m | 53.05 |
| 2021 | World Relays | Chorzów, Poland | 9th (h) | 4 × 400 m relay | 3:34.92 |
| 2021 | Olympic Games | Tokyo, Japan | 9th (h) | Mixed 4 × 400 m relay | 3:09.14 |
| 2022 | World Indoor Championships | Belgrade, Serbia | 9th (h) | 4 × 400 m relay | 3:34.92 |
| 2023 | European Games | Chorzów, Poland | 24th | 400 m | 53.38 |
| 2023 | European Games | Chorzów, Poland | 15th | Mixed 4 × 400 m relay | 3:16.79 |
| 2023 | World Championships | Budapest, Hungary | 15th (h) | 4 × 400 m relay | 3:31.91 |
| 2024 | World Relays | Nassau, Bahamas | 14th (h) | 4 × 400 m relay | 3:31.03 |

== Personal bests ==
Outdoor

- 100 metres – 12.43 (Málaga 2020)
- 400 metres – 52.14 (Berlín 2018)

Indoor

- 200 metres – 24.47 (Antequera 2019)
- 400 metres – 52.67 (Glasgow 2018)
- 800 metres – 2:06.26 (Sabadell-2019)

== National récords ==
Outdoor

- 500 metres – 1:11.33 (Antequera 2019)
- 600 metres – 1:28.14 (Antequera 2019)

Indoor

- 500 metres – 1:11.13 (Granada 2017)
- 600 metres – 1:26.21 (Barcelona 2018)

== Official sponsor ==
Nike (1 January 2018 - 2021)
