= Polina Miller (sprinter) =

Russian sprinter (born 2000)

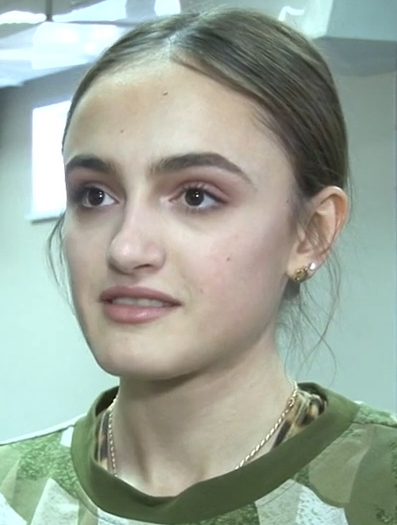
- Polina Miller in 2020

Personal information
- Born: 9 June 2000 (age 26)

Sport
- Sport: Women's athletics
- Event(s): 200 metres, 400 metres
Medal record
Military World Games
Silver medal – second place	2019 Wuhan	400 m

Polina Andreyevna Miller (Russian: Полина Андреевна Миллер; born 9 June 2000) is a Russian sprinter competing in the 200 and 400 metres. She finished fourth in the 200 metres at the 2018 World U20 Championships.

== International competitions ==
Year	Competition	Venue	Position	Event	Notes
Competing as an Authorised Neutral Athletes
2017	European U20 Championships	Grosseto, Italy	12th (sf)	200 m	23.92
2018	World U20 Championships	Tampere, Finland	4th	200 m	23.32
2018	European Championships	Berlin, Germany	11th (sf)	400 m	51.65
2019	European Indoor Championships	Glasgow, United Kingdom	5th (sf)	400 m	52.46
2019	European U20 Championships	Borås, Sweden	1st	400 m	51.72
2019	World Championships	Doha, Qatar	25th (h)	400 m	51.96

== Personal bests ==
Outdoor

- 200 metres – 23.15 (+0.3 m/s, Smolensk 2018)
- 400 metres – 50.76 (Tomblaine 2021)

Indoor

- 200 metres – 23.77 (Moscow 2018)
- 400 metres – 50.71 (Saint Petersburg 2022)
