= Atchima Eng-chuan =

Thai sprinter (born 1990)

Atchima Eng-Chuan
Personal information
- Born: 10 February 1990 (age 36)
- Height: 1.61 m (5 ft 3 in)
- Weight: 50 kg (110 lb)

Sport
- Sport: Athletics
- Event: 400 metres
Medal record
Women's athletics
Representing Thailand
Asian Indoor Championships
Silver medal – second place	2014 Hangzhou	4×400 m

Atchima Eng-Chuan (born 10 February 1990) is a Thai sprinter specialising in the 400 metres. She won a bronze medal at the 2017 Asian Indoor and Martial Arts Games. She holds the current national indoor record in the 400 metres.

== International competitions ==
Year	Competition	Venue	Position	Event	Notes
Representing Thailand
2008	Asian Junior Championships	Jakarta, Indonesia	1st	4 × 100 m relay	45.95
2008	Asian Junior Championships	Jakarta, Indonesia	4th	4 × 400 m relay	3:47.53
2008	World Junior Championships	Bydgoszcz, Poland	51st (h)	200 m	26.05
2008	World Junior Championships	Bydgoszcz, Poland	18th (h)	4 × 400 m relay	45.99
2013	Southeast Asian Games	Naypyidaw, Myanmar	4th	400 m	55.19
2013	Southeast Asian Games	Naypyidaw, Myanmar	1st	4 × 400 m relay	3:36.58
2014	Asian Indoor Championships	Hangzhou, China	2nd	4 × 400 m relay	3:42.55
2014	Asian Games	Incheon, South Korea	15th (h)	400 m	55.18
2014	Asian Games	Incheon, South Korea	4th	4 × 400 m relay	3:33.16
2015	Southeast Asian Games	Singapore	2nd	4 × 400 m relay	3:36.82
2015	Universiade	Gwangju, South Korea	7th	4 × 400 m relay	3:43.53
2017	Asian Championships	Bhubaneswar, India	5th	4 × 400 m relay	3:38.63
2017	Southeast Asian Games	Kuala Lumpur, Malaysia	2nd	4 × 400 m relay	3:38.95
2017	Universiade	Taipei, Taiwan	7th	4 × 400 m relay	3:43.53
2017	Asian Indoor and Martial Arts Games	Ashgabat, Turkmenistan	3rd	400 m	54.45
2017	Asian Indoor and Martial Arts Games	Ashgabat, Turkmenistan	1st	4 × 400 m relay	3:43.41

== Personal bests ==
Outdoor

- 200 metres – 24.73 (+1.0 m/s, Kaohsiung 2011)
- 400 metres – 55.12 (Rheinau-Freistett 2014)

Indoor

- 400 metres – 54.45 (Ashgabat 2017) NR
