= Athletics at the 2013 SEA Games – Women's 400 metres =

The women's 400 metres, at the 2013 SEA Games, was held in Naypyidaw, Myanmar. The track and field events took place at the Wunna Theikdi Stadium on December 15.

== Schedule ==
All times are Myanmar Standard Time (UTC+06:30)

Date	Time	Event
Sunday, 15 December 2013	10:00	Heats
Sunday, 15 December 2013	16:30	Final

== Records ==
Prior to this competition, the existing world, Asian, and Southeast Asian Games records were as follows.

World Record	Marita Koch (GDR)	47.60	Canberra, Australia	6 October 1985
Asian Record	Ma Yuqin (CHN)	49.81	Beijing, China	11 September 1993
Games Record	Nguyen Thi Tinh (VIE)	51.83	Hanoi, Vietnam	8 December 2003

== Results ==
Legend

- DSQ — Disqualified
- DNF — Do Not Finish

=== Round 1 ===
==== Heat 1 ====
Rank	Lane	Athlete	Time	Notes
1	3	Quach Thi Lan (VIE)	54.35	
2	5	Atchima Engchuan (THA)	55.40	
3	2	Yin Yin Khine (MYA)	55.48	
4	7	T Piriyah (SIN)	57.75	
5	6	Fatin Faqihah Mohd Yusuf (MAS)	58.47	
6	4	Maziah Mahusin (BRU)	1:02.64	

==== Heat 2 ====
Rank	Lane	Athlete	Time	Notes
1	2	Treewadee Yongphan (THA)	54.63	
2	6	Nguyen Thi Oanh (VIE)	54.85	
3	3	Aye Aye Than (MYA)	57.08	
4	5	Nurul Faizah Asma Mazlan (MAS)	58.07	
5	4	Goh Chui Ling (SIN)	59.47	

=== Final ===
Rank	Lane	Athlete	Time	Notes
1st place, gold medalist(s)	3	Treewadee Yongphan (THA)	53.11	
2nd place, silver medalist(s)	6	Quach Thi Lan (VIE)	53.38	
3rd place, bronze medalist(s)	4	Nguyen Thi Oanh (VIE)	53.71	
4	5	Atchima Engchuan (THA)	55.19	
5	7	Yin Yin Khine (MYA)	55.56	
6	8	Aye Aye Than (MYA)	56.94	
7	2	Nurul Faizah Asma Mazlan (MAS)	56.94	
8	1	T Piriyah (SIN)	57.66	
