= Pornpan Hoemhuk =

Thai sprinter (born 1993)

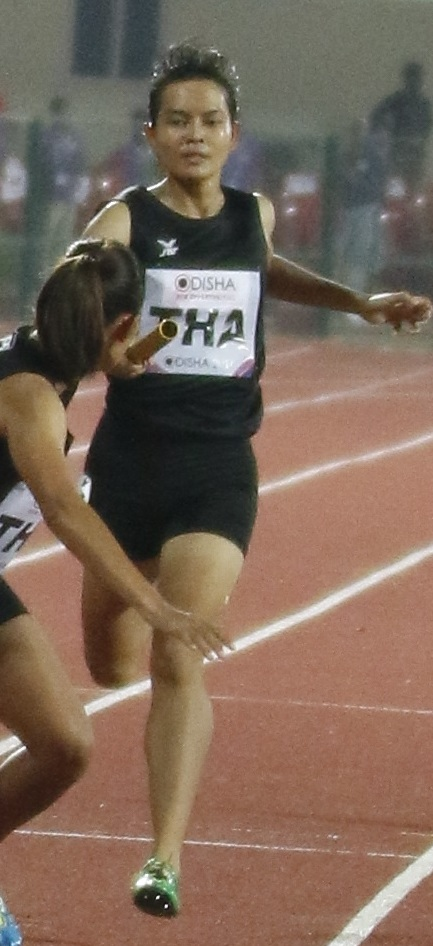
- Pornpan Hoemhuk in 2017

Personal information
- Born: 1 June 1993 (age 33)
- Height: 1.64 m (5 ft 5 in)
- Weight: 54 kg (119 lb)

Sport
- Sport: Athletics
- Event: 400 metres
Medal record
Women's athletics
Representing Thailand
Asian Indoor Championships
Silver medal – second place	2014 Hangzhou	4×400 m

Pornpan Hoemhuk (born 3 June 1993) is a Thai sprinter specialising in the 400 metres. She has won several medals at regional level.

Her personal best in the event is 55.42 seconds set in Schifflange in 2014.

== International competitions ==
Year	Competition	Venue	Position	Event	Notes
Representing Thailand
2010	Asian Junior Championships	Hanoi, Vietnam	1st	4 × 400 m relay	3:53.77
2011	Southeast Asian Games	Palembang, Indonesia	1st	4 × 400 m relay	3:41.35
2013	Southeast Asian Games	Naypyidaw, Myanmar	1st	4 × 400 m relay	3:36.58
2014	Asian Indoor Championships	Hangzhou, China	2nd	4 × 400 m relay	3:42.55
2014	Asian Games	Incheon, South Korea	4th	4 × 400 m relay	3:33.16
2015	Southeast Asian Games	Singapore	2nd	4 × 400 m relay	3:36.82
2015	Universiade	Gwangju, South Korea	18th (sf)	400 m	55.93
2015	Universiade	Gwangju, South Korea	7th	4 × 400 m relay	3:43.53
2017	Asian Championships	Bhubaneswar, India	10th (h)	400 m	57.22
2017	Asian Championships	Bhubaneswar, India	5th	4 × 400 m relay	3:38.63
2017	Southeast Asian Games	Kuala Lumpur, Malaysia	4th	400 m	55.59
2017	Southeast Asian Games	Kuala Lumpur, Malaysia	2nd	4 × 400 m relay	3:38.95
2017	Universiade	Taipei, Taiwan	7th	4 × 400 m relay	3:43.53
2017	Asian Indoor and Martial Arts Games	Ashgabat, Turkmenistan	1st	4 × 400 m relay	3:43.41
