= Laura de Witte =

Dutch sprinter

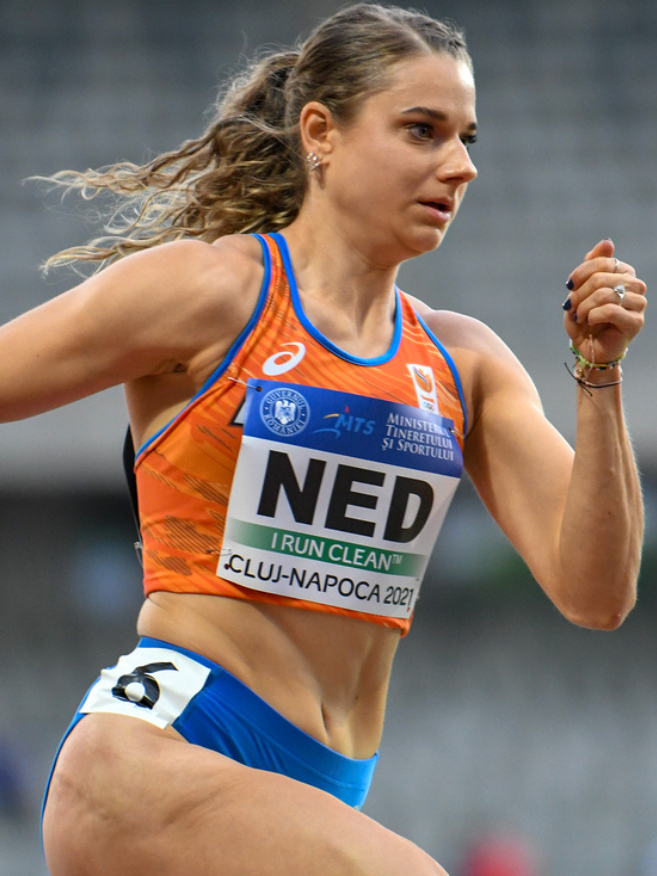
- De Witte at the 2021 European Team Championships

Personal information
- Born: 7 August 1995 (age 30) Leek, Netherlands
- Height: 1.73 m (5 ft 8 in)
- Weight: 61 kg (134 lb)

Sport
- Sport: Athletics
- Event: 400 metres
Medal record
Women's athletics
Representing the Netherlands
European Championships
Gold medal – first place	2022 Munich	4×400 m relay
European U23 Championships
Bronze medal – third place	2017 Bydgoszcz	400 m

Laura de Witte (pronounced [ˈlʌuraː də ˈʋɪtə]; born 7 August 1995) is a Dutch sprinter who specializes in the 400 metres. She competed at the 2016 and 2020 Summer Olympics. De Witte was born in Leek, Netherlands. Her older sister, Lisanne de Witte, is also a 400 m sprinter.

== Career ==
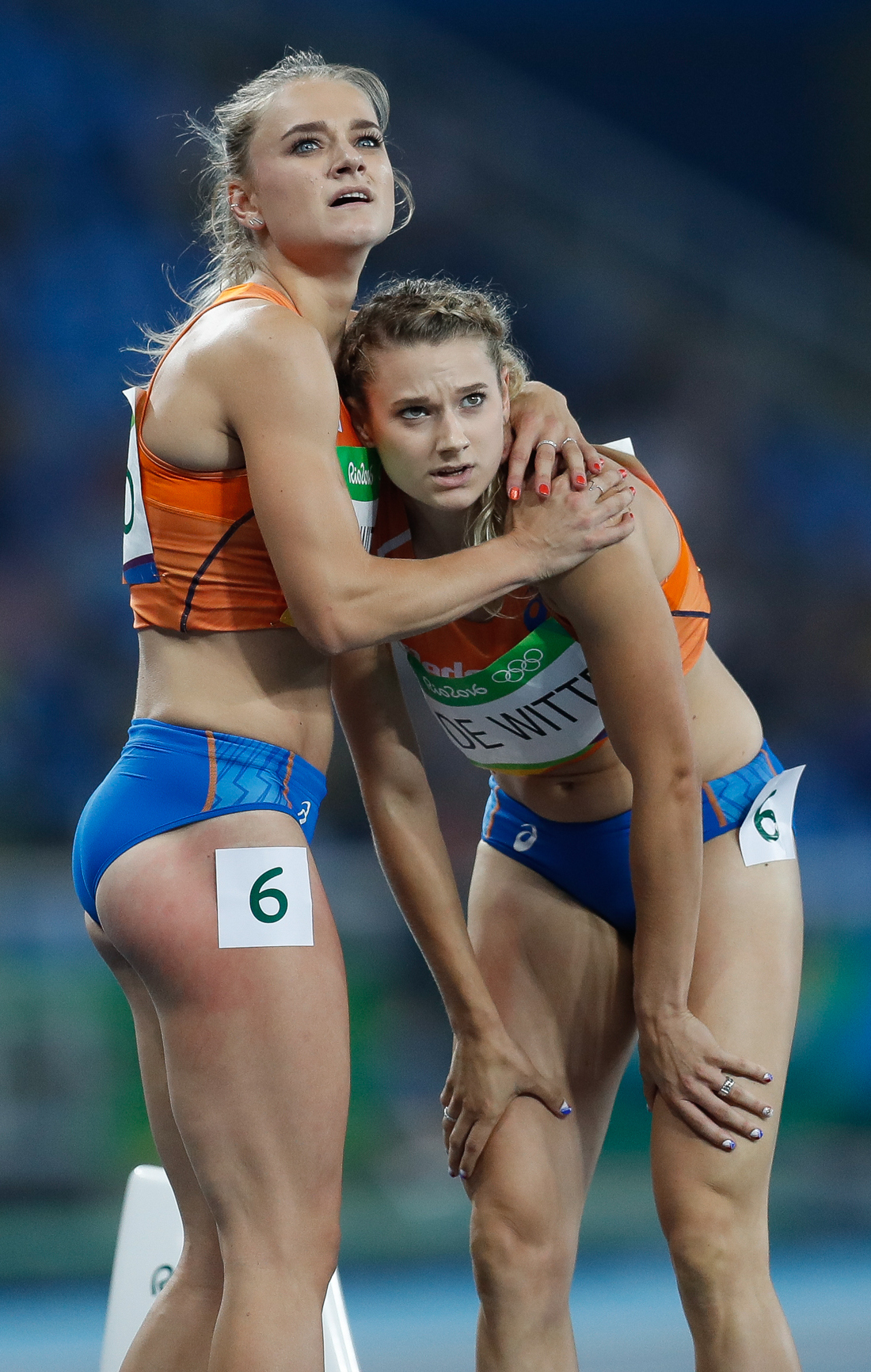
De Witte (right) with her sister Lisanne at the 2016 Summer Olympics

In June 2016, De Witte won the silver medal in the 400 m at the Dutch Championships. Her time of 53.47 seconds ranked second behind only her sister Lisanne.

De Witte competed at the European Championships in July 2016. In the 200 metres, she finished 16th in the semifinals and did not advance to the final. She ran in the heats and the final of the women's 4 × 400 metres relay, and the Dutch team finished seventh.

In August 2016, De Witte competed at the Summer Olympics, running in the heats of the women's 4 × 400 metres relay. The Dutch team did not advance to the final.

In July 2017, De Witte competed in the 400 m at the European U23 Championships. She ran her personal best time of 52.15 s in the heats to qualify for the final. In the final, she ran 52.51 s to win the bronze medal.

In August 2017, De Witte competed at the World Championships. She ran in the heats of the women's 4 × 400 metres relay, in which the Dutch team was disqualified.

In August 2018, De Witte competed at the European Championships. She ran in the heats of the 400 m. She had a time of 52.57 s and did not advance to the semifinals.

In July 2019, De Witte competed in the 400 m at the Summer Universiade. She finished 16th in the semifinals at 54.45 s and did not advance to the final.

In June 2021, De Witte won the silver medal in the 400 m at the Dutch Championships with a time of 53.38 s, finishing behind her sister Lisanne. Laura was then named to the Olympic team.

In August 2021, De Witte competed at the Summer Olympics. She ran in the heats and the final of the women's 4 × 400 metres relay, and the Dutch team finished sixth.

In August 2022, De Witte competed at the 2022 European Championships. She ran in the heats of the women's 4 × 400 metres relay. The Dutch team finished first in the final, earning a gold medal for De Witte.

De Witte struggled during the 2024 season and was unable to break 56.00 s in the 400 m. She did not make the Olympic team.

== Personal bests ==
- 100 metres – 11.88 (+0.1 m/s, Oordegem, Lede 2016)
- 200 metres – 23.23 (+0.9 m/s, Amsterdam 2016)
- 400 metres – 52.15 (Bydgoszcz 2017)
  - 400 metres indoor – 53.63 (Apeldoorn 2018)
