= Dipna Lim Prasad =

Singaporean sprinter and hurdler

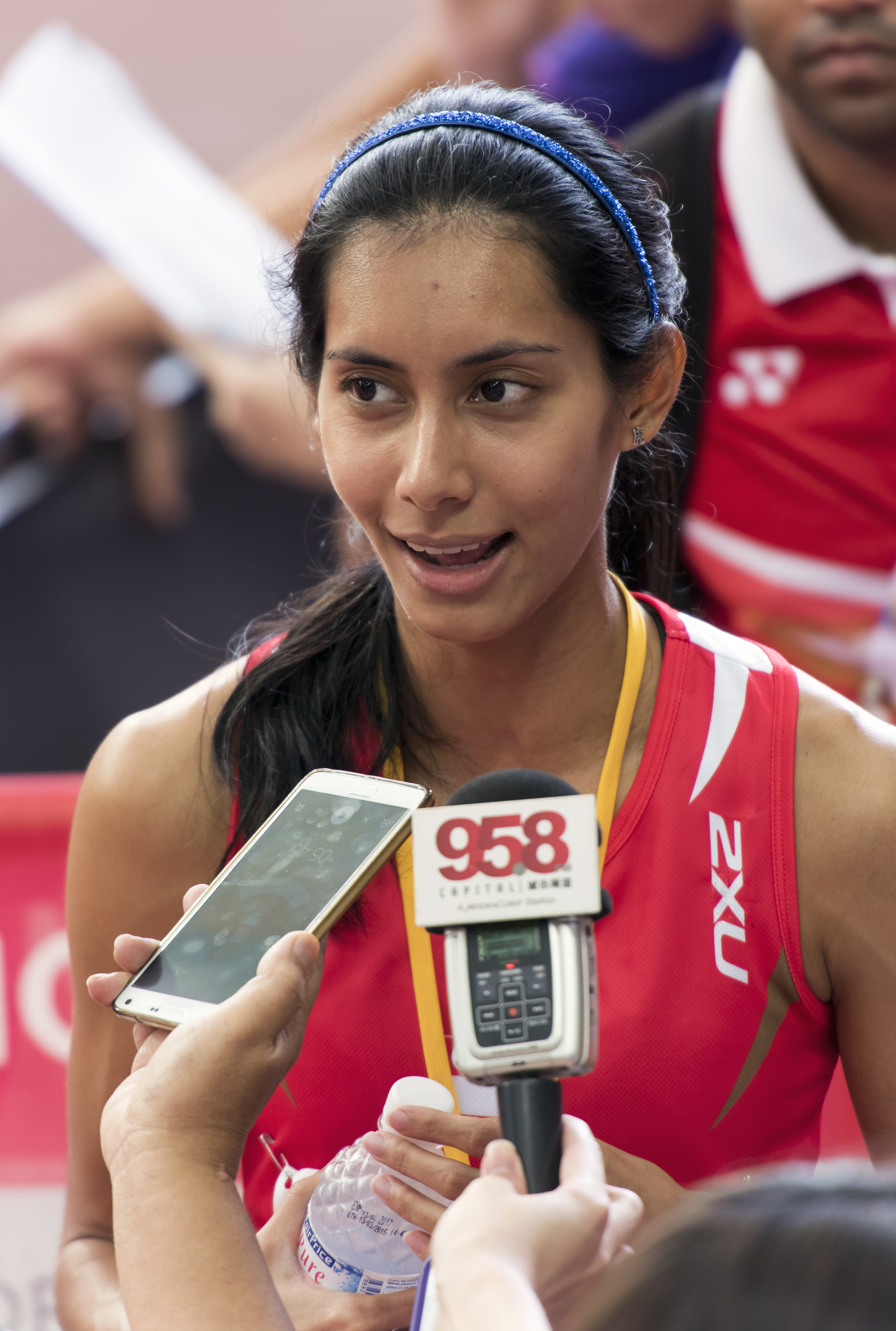
- Dipna Lim Prasad speaking to the press after her silver medal performance in the 400 metres hurdles event at the 2015 SEA Games.

Personal information
- National team: Singapore
- Born: 7 June 1991 (age 35) Singapore
- Spouse: Poh Seng Song
- Children: 2
Medal record
Women's athletics
Representing Singapore
South East Asian Games
Silver medal – second place	2017 Malaysia	400 m
Silver medal – second place	2017 Malaysia	400 m hurdles
Silver medal – second place	2015 Singapore	400 m hurdles
Bronze medal – third place	2013 Myanmar	400 m hurdles

Dipna Lim Prasad (born 7 June 1991 in Singapore) is a Singaporean sprinter and hurdler. At the 2012 Summer Olympics, she competed in the Women's 100 metres hurdles. Dipna specialises in the 100 metres hurdles but also competes in the 100 metres, 200 metres, 400 metres hurdles, 4 × 100 metres relay, and 4 × 400 metres relay.

== Education ==
Dipna enrolled into the Singapore Sports School in 2004 as part of the pioneer batch. She graduated in 2007 after completing her secondary school education. She holds a diploma in Sports and Exercise Science from Auckland University of Technology from which she graduated in 2009. Later, in 2010, Dipna furthered her education in Nanyang Technological University where she graduated in 2014 with a degree in Sport Science and Management.

== Records ==
Dipna is the 400 metres hurdles national record holder. At the 2013 Southeast Asian Games in Myanmar, she became the first Singaporean to run under 60 seconds for the 400 metre hurdles.

From 2008–2014, Dipna held the 100 metre hurdles women's national record and Junior Record for Singapore from 2008–2014. In 2013, Dipna broke Prema Govindan's 29-year-old national 200 metres national record. Dipna has not run a 200-metre since, and her record has since been broken by Shanti Pereira. Pereira also broke Dipna's 400 metres record in 2024.

Dipna has represented Singapore in the 2012 London Olympics; 2011 IAAF World Championships; 2012 IAAF World Indoor Championships; several editions of the South East Asian Games; Asian Athletic Championships; and Asian Indoor Athletic Championships.

== Personal life ==
Dipna married her boyfriend of six years, and fellow runner, Poh Seng Song in 2014. They have two children together.
