= Mary Joy Tabal =

Filipino marathon runner (born 1989)

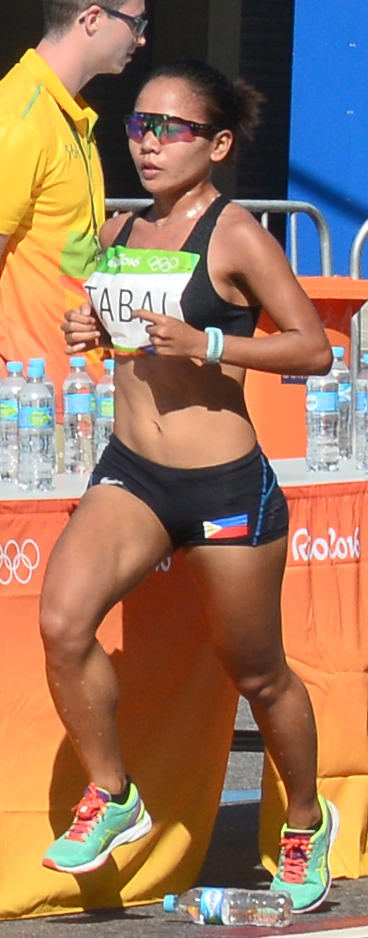
- Mary Joy Tabal at the 2016 Olympics

Personal information
- Nickname: MJ
- Nationality: Filipino
- Born: Mary Joy Reyes Tabal; July 13, 1989 (age 37) Cebu City, Philippines
- Education: Southwestern University (BS, MPA); Cebu Technological University (DPA)
- Height: 149 cm (4 ft 11 in)
- Weight: 45 kg (99 lb)
- Spouse: Hector Dan Jimenez (m. 2022)
- Children: 1
- Military career
- Allegiance: Philippines
- Branch: Philippine Coast Guard Auxiliary
- Service years: 2020–present
- Unit: lieutenant commander

Sport
- Country: Philippines
- Sport: Athletics
- Event: Marathon
- Coached by: John Philip Dueñas

Achievements and titles
- Personal best: Marathon 2:43:31 (2016) Half Marathon 1:16:29 (2017)
Medal record
Women's athletics
Representing Philippines
Event	1st	2nd	3rd
Southeast Asian Games	1	2	0
Total	1	2	0
Southeast Asian Games
Gold medal – first place	2017 Kuala Lumpur	marathon
Silver medal – second place	2019 Philippines	marathon
Silver medal – second place	2015 Singapore	marathon

Mary Joy "MJ" Reyes Tabal-Jimenez OLY (born July 13, 1989) is a Filipino marathon runner. She is the first female Filipino marathon runner to qualify for the Olympics, which she has done by running a time of 2:43:29 in the Scotiabank Ottawa Marathon in 2016. She placed 124th at the 2016 Rio Olympics.

Tabal, a veteran of local and international marathons, made her official debut at the 2003 Southeast Asian Games in Hanoi, Vietnam and has won a silver medal in the women's marathon competition in the 2015 Southeast Asian Games in Singapore, and a gold medal in the 2017 SEA Games in Kuala Lumpur Malaysia and won the women's division title in the National Milo Marathon Finals for six straight years, 2013, 2014, 2015, 2016, 2017 and 2018. She was recognized as the 2016 Athlete of the Year by the Sportswriters Association of Cebu. Tabal and fellow marathon runner Rafael Poliquit Jr. represented the Philippines in the 2016 Boston Marathon in April 2016. She finished 20th overall in the race.

== Career ==
=== 2016 ===
On July 13, 2016, the Philippine Athletics Track and Field Association (PATAFA) reinstated Tabal in the national team, a year after she resigned due to conflicts between training and sponsorship agreements with Motorace Racing, Tabal's sponsor, but it was removed from the association's national team in September 2016, days after her Olympics stint.

On December 4, 2016, Tabal won the women's category of the Milo Marathon National Finals in Iloilo and she became the first runner in the marathon's history to complete a four-peat title record by clocking in 2 hours, 47 minutes and 57 seconds.

=== 2017 ===
At the first day of the 29th Southeast Asian Games on August 19, 2017, Tabal gave the country's first gold medal after dominating the 42 km women's marathon event with an official time of 2 hours, 48 minutes and 26 seconds.

== In popular media ==
In 2018, actress Sharlene San Pedro portrayed Tabal's life story in Maalaala Mo Kaya's episode entitled Rubber Shoes which was aired last February 24, 2018.
