= Natthaya Thanaronnawat =

Thai long-distance runner

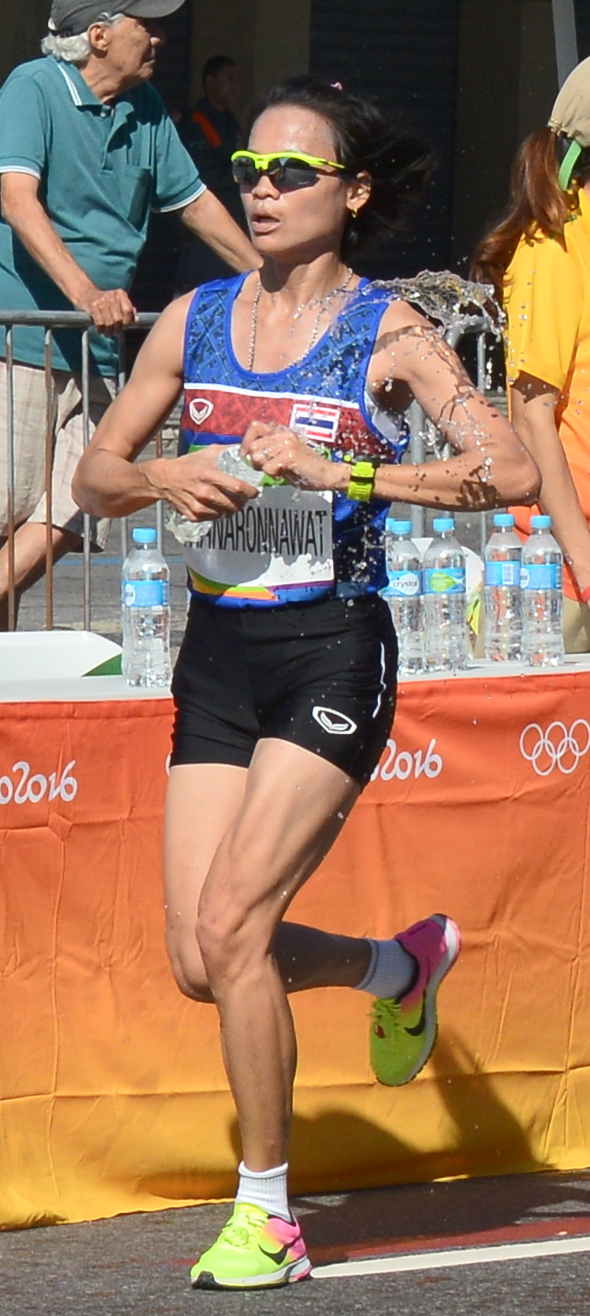
- Thanaronnawat at the 2016 Olympics

Personal information
- Nationality: Thai
- Born: 12 June 1979 (age 47)
- Education: Chiang Mai University
- Height: 158 cm (5 ft 2 in)
- Weight: 47 kg (104 lb)

Sport
- Sport: Athletics
- Event: Marathon

Achievements and titles
- Personal best: 2:44:45 (2016)
Medal record
Representing Thailand
Southeast Asian Games
Gold medal – first place	2015 Singapore	marathon

Natthaya Thanaronnawat (born 12 June 1979) is a Thai long-distance runner. She won the marathon at the 2015 Southeast Asian Games and placed 130th at the 2016 Rio Olympics. She is married and has a daughter Willow.
