= Swe Li Myint =

Burmese middle-distance runner (born 1993)

Personal information
- Born: June 24, 1993 (age 33)
- Height: 1.68 m (5 ft 6 in)
- Weight: 55 kg (121 lb)

Sport
- Country: Myanmar
- Sport: Athletics
Medal record
Women's Athletics
Representing Myanmar Athletics
South East Asian Games
Silver medal – second place	2013 Naypyidaw	4 × 400 m relay
Silver medal – second place	2015 Singapore	800m
Bronze medal – third place	2013 Naypyidaw	800m
Bronze medal – third place	2017 Kuala Lumpur	800m

Swe Li Myint (born June 24, 1993) is a Burmese middle-distance runner. She competed at the 2016 Summer Olympics in the women's 800 metres race; her time of 2:16.98 in the heats did not qualify her for the semifinals.
