= List of flag bearers for Namibia at the Olympics =

Namibia at the Olympics
- IOC code: NAM
- NOC: Namibia National Olympic Committee
- Website: olympic.org.na
- Medals: Gold 0 Silver 5 Bronze 0 Total 5

Summer appearances
- 1992; 1996; 2000; 2004; 2008; 2012; 2016; 2020; 2024

This is a list of flag bearers who have represented Namibia at the Olympics.

Flag bearers carry the national flag of their country at the opening ceremony of the Olympic Games.

#	Event year	Season	Flag bearer	Sport
1	1992	Summer	Frankie Fredericks	Athletics
2	1996	Summer	Friedhelm Sack	Shooting
3	2000	Summer	Paulus Ali Nuumbembe	Boxing
4	2004	Summer	Paulus Ambunda	Boxing
5	2008	Summer	Mannie Heymans	Cycling
6	2012	Summer	Gaby Ahrens	Shooting
7	2016	Summer	Jonas Jonas	Boxing
8	2020	Summer	Maike Diekmann	Rowing
8	2020	Summer	Jonas Jonas	Boxing
9	2024	Summer	Vera Looser	Cycling
9	2024	Summer	Alex Miller	Cycling

== See also ==
- Namibia at the Olympics
