= Namibia at the 2016 Summer Olympics =

- IOC code: NAM
- NOC: Namibian National Olympic Committee

in Rio de Janeiro
- Competitors: 10 in 4 sports
- Flag bearer: Jonas Junias
- Medals: Gold 0 Silver 0 Bronze 0 Total 0

Summer Olympics appearances (overview)
- 1992; 1996; 2000; 2004; 2008; 2012; 2016; 2020; 2024

Namibia competed at the 2016 Summer Olympics in Rio de Janeiro, Brazil, from 5 to 21 August 2016. This was the nation's seventh consecutive appearance at the Summer Olympics.

Namibian National Olympic Committee sent a team of 10 athletes, 4 men and 6 women, to compete in track and field, boxing, road cycling, mountain biking, and shooting at the Olympics, matching the nation's roster size with Beijing 2008. The Namibian roster featured four returning Olympians; two of them attended their third straight Games, including marathon runner Beata Naigambo and Africa's top-seeded trap shooter Gaby Ahrens. Meanwhile, amateur light welterweight boxer Jonas Junias, the youngest of the team (aged 22), was chosen to be Namibia's flag bearer in the opening ceremony.

Namibia, however, failed to win a single Olympic medal since the 1996 Summer Olympics in Atlanta, where sprinter Frankie Fredericks collected two silvers each in both the men's 100 and 200 metres.

== Athletics (track and field) ==
Namibian athletes have so far achieved qualifying standards in the following athletics events (up to a maximum of 3 athletes in each event):

Key

- Note–Ranks given for track events are within the athlete's heat only
- Q = Qualified for the next round
- q = Qualified for the next round as a fastest loser or, in field events, by position without achieving the qualifying target
- NR = National record
- N/A = Round not applicable for the event
- Bye = Athlete not required to compete in round

Track & road events

Athlete	Event	Final	
Athlete	Event	Result	Rank
Mynhardt Kawanivi	Men's marathon	2:20:45	70
Alina Armas	Women's marathon	2:44:20	75
Helalia Johannes	Women's marathon	2:39:55	56
Beata Naigambo	Women's marathon	2:36:32	41

== Boxing ==
Namibia has entered two boxers to compete in the following weight classes into the Olympic boxing tournament. Mathias Hamunyela and Jonas Junias had claimed their Olympic spots at the 2016 African Qualification Tournament in Yaoundé, Cameroon.

Athlete	Event	Round of 32	Round of 16	Quarterfinals	Semifinals	Final	
Athlete	Event	Opposition Result	Opposition Result	Opposition Result	Opposition Result	Opposition Result	Rank
Mathias Hamunyela	Men's light flyweight	Huseynov (AZE); W 3–0	Zhakypov (KAZ); L 0–3	Did not advance			
Jonas Junias	Men's light welterweight	Amzile (FRA); L 0–3	Did not advance				

== Cycling ==
=== Road ===
Namibia has qualified one rider in the men's Olympic road race by virtue of his individual ranking among the next two best ranked NOCs at the 2015 African Championships. One female rider has been added to the Namibian squad to compete in the women's Olympic road race by finishing first at the 2016 African Championships.

Athlete	Event	Time	Rank
Dan Craven	Men's road race	Did not finish	
Dan Craven	Men's time trial	1:27:47.93	35
Vera Adrian	Women's road race	Did not finish	

=== Mountain biking ===
Namibia has qualified one mountain biker in the women's Olympic cross-country race by virtue of her top individual ranking at the 2015 African Championships.

Athlete	Event	Time	Rank
Michelle Vorster	Women's cross-country	LAP (2 laps)	26

== Shooting ==
Namibia has qualified one shooter in the women's trap by securing one of the available Olympic berths at the 2015 Africa Continental Championships in Cairo, Egypt.

Athlete	Event	Qualification		Semifinal		Final	
Athlete	Event	Points	Rank	Points	Rank	Points	Rank
Gaby Ahrens	Women's trap	66	9	Did not advance			

== See also ==
- Namibia at the 2016 Summer Paralympics
