= Namibia at the 2019 African Games =

- Flag of Namibia
- IOC code: NAM
- NOC: Namibian National Olympic Committee

in Rabat, Morocco 19 August 2019 – 31 August 2019
- Competitors: 68 (47 men and 21 women) in 13 sports
- Medals Ranked 16th: Gold 2 Silver 2 Bronze 4 Total 8

African Games appearances (overview)
- 1991; 1995; 1999; 2003; 2007; 2011; 2015; 2019; 2023

Namibia competed at the 2019 African Games held from 19 to 31 August 2019 in Rabat, Morocco. Early on 56 athletes were scheduled to represent Namibia in 10 sports. This later grew to 68 athletes in 13 sports. (Note: The sports mountain biking and road cycling are listed together under "Cycling".) In total two gold medals, two silver medals and four bronze medals were won and the country finished in 16th place in the medal table, shared with Angola. Most medals were won in cycling.

== Medal summary ==
=== Medal table ===
Medal	Name	Sport	Event	Date
Gold	Tristan De Lange	Cycling	Men's Mountain bike Cross-country Olympic	21 August
Gold	Tristan De Lange	Cycling	Men's Mountain bike Cross-country Marathon	23 August
Silver	Alexander Miller	Cycling	Men's Mountain bike Cross-country Olympic	21 August
Silver	Quinn Reddig; Adriaan Grobler	Archery	Mixed team	30 August
Bronze	Alexander Miller	Cycling	Men's Mountain bike Cross-country Marathon	23 August
Bronze	Vera Adrian	Cycling	Women's Time trial	26 August
Bronze	Vera Adrian	Cycling	Women's Road race	28 August
Bronze	Jonas Junias Jonas	Boxing	Men's 63 kg	28 August

Medals by sport
Sport	1st place, gold medalist(s)	2nd place, silver medalist(s)	3rd place, bronze medalist(s)	Total
Archery	0	1	0	1
Boxing	0	0	1	1
Cycling	2	1	3	6
Total	2	2	4	8

Medals by date
Day	Date	1st place, gold medalist(s)	2nd place, silver medalist(s)	3rd place, bronze medalist(s)	Total
6	21 August	1	1	0	2
8	23 August	1	0	1	2
11	26 August	0	0	1	1
13	28 August	0	0	2	2
15	30 August	0	1	0	1
Total		2	2	4	8

Medals by gender
Gender	1st place, gold medalist(s)	2nd place, silver medalist(s)	3rd place, bronze medalist(s)	Total
Male	2	1	2	3
Female	0	0	2	2
Mixed	0	1	0	1
Total	2	2	4	8

== Archery ==
Adriaan Paul Grobler and Quinn Reddig competed in archery and they won the silver medal in the mixed team event.

Grobler also competed in the men's individual event and Reddig also competed in the women's individual event.

== Athletics ==
Namibia competed in athletics.

Chenoult Lionel Coetzee and Gilbert Hainuca competed in the men's 100 metres event. Neither of them qualified to compete in the semifinals.

Jolene Jacobs and Globine Mayova competed in the women's 100 metres event. Jacobs advanced to the semifinals and Mayova did not advance to the semifinals.

Gideon Ernst Narib, Kamuaruuma Sydney and Alexander Mahmad Bock competed in the men's 200 metres event.

Tjipekapora Herunga and Beatrice Masilingi competed in the women's 400 metres event. Herunga qualified in the heats to compete in the semifinals and Masilingi qualified to compete in the final. She finished in 7th place.

== Boxing ==
Namibia selected eleven boxers to represent the country at the 2019 African Games: At the Games, only eight boxers participated: Gabriel Shigwedha, Trofimus Johannes, Chris Kangorondue didn't step into a ring.

Jonas Junias Jonas won the bronze medal in the men's super lightweight (63 kg) event.

Key:

- KO – Knockout.
- RSC – Referee stops contest (unspecified).
- RSCO – Referee stops contest for an outclassed opponent.

Men

Athlete	Event	Round of 32	Round of 16	Quarterfinals	Semifinals	Final	Rank
Athlete	Event	Opposition Result	Opposition Result	Opposition Result	Opposition Result	Opposition Result	Rank
Nestor Thomas	−52 kg	R Mahommed (BOT); L 1–4	Did not advance				
Tryagain Ndevelo	−57 kg	Bye	K Hounkpatin (TOG); W 5–0	E Mulenga (ZAM); L 0–5	Did not advance		
Jonas Jonas	−63 kg	R Abdelkawi (EGY); W 5–0	A Sylla (GUI); W 5–0	AW Omar (GHA); W 4–1	A Nadir (MAR); L 2–3	Did not advance	3rd place, bronze medalist(s)
Martin Kambalili	−69 kg	M Keralah (ETH); L 0–5	Did not advance				
Andreas Shikongo	−75 kg	S Kamara (SLE); W 5–0	T Allali (MAR); L 0–5	Did not advance			
Immanuel Shaanika	−81 kg	—N/a	JC Otendy (MRI); L – RSC on round 2	Did not advance			
Oiva Waitele	−91 kg	—N/a	Bye	Y Baalla (MAR); L – KO on round 1	Did not advance		
Naftali Sheyapo	+91 kg	—N/a	Bye	S Adebayo (NGR); L 0–5	Did not advance		

== Chess ==
Four chess players represented Namibia in chess: Dante Beukes, Charles Eichab, Lishen Mentile and Nicola Veweza Tjaronda.

== Cycling ==
Namibia competed in road cycling and mountain bike cycling.

== Fencing ==
Namibia competed in fencing. Johan Pieterse, Jens Pinsenschaum and Connor Strydom competed in the men's Individual Épée event and the Team Épée event.

== Karate ==
Namibia competed in karate.

== Shooting ==
Namibia competed in shooting. Ian Kriel, Hendrik Roos and Frans Venter competed in the men's trap event.

== Swimming ==
Two athletes represented Namibia in swimming.

Men

Athlete	Event	Heat		Final	
Athlete	Event	Time	Rank	Time	Rank
Xander Skinner	50 m freestyle	23.19	7 Q	23.09	5
Xander Skinner	100 m freestyle	50.86	4 Q	50.53	5
Xander Skinner	200 m freestyle	1:54.41	8 Q	1:55.10	8
Xander Skinner	50 m butterfly	26.10	18	Did not advance	
Xander Skinner	100 m backstroke	59.28	9	Did not advance	
Xander Skinner	100 m butterfly	59.09	21	Did not advance	

Women

Athlete	Event	Heat		Final	
Athlete	Event	Time	Rank	Time	Rank
Kiah Borg	50 m freestyle	28.15	15	Did not advance	
Kiah Borg	50 m butterfly	30.58	15	Did not advance	

== Tennis ==
Namibia entered four tennis players into the African Games, three men and one woman.

Men

Athlete	Event	Round of 64	Round of 32	Round of 16	Quarterfinals	Semifinals	Final / BM	
Athlete	Event	Opposition Score	Opposition Score	Opposition Score	Opposition Score	Opposition Score	Opposition Score	Rank
Jean Erasmus	Men's singles	L Andriamasilalao (MAD); L 1–6, 3–6	Did not advance					
Gideon Van Dyk	Men's singles	B Kargbo (SLE); L 2–6, 5–7	Did not advance					
Codie Van Schalkwyk	Men's singles	K-M Maamoun (EGY); L 0–6, 0–6	Did not advance					
Jean Erasmus; Gideon Van Dyk	Men's doubles	—N/a	S Emmanuel / J Ubong (NGR); L 6–7^{(1–7)}, 0–6	Did not advance				

Women

Athlete	Event	Round of 64	Round of 32	Round of 16	Quarterfinals	Semifinals	Final / BM	
Athlete	Event	Opposition Score	Opposition Score	Opposition Score	Opposition Score	Opposition Score	Opposition Score	Rank
Liniques Theron	Women's singles	B Matsiwe (ZIM); W 6–1, 6–1	L Salama (EGY); L 2–6, 1–6	Did not advance				

== Volleyball ==
Kristin Schulz and Kim Seebach represented Namibia in beach volleyball in the women's tournament and they reached the quarterfinals.

== Wrestling ==
Two athletes represented Namibia in wrestling.

Key:

- VT – Victory by fall.
- PP – Decision by points – the loser with technical points.
- PO – Decision by points – the loser without technical points.
- ST – Great superiority – the loser without technical points and a margin of victory of at least 8 (Greco-Roman) or 10 (freestyle) points.
- SP – Technical superiority – the loser with technical points and a margin of victory of at least 8 (Greco-Roman) or 10 (freestyle) points.

Men's freestyle

Athlete	Event	Qualification	Quarterfinal	Semifinal	Repechage 1	Final / BM	
Athlete	Event	Opposition Result	Opposition Result	Opposition Result	Opposition Result	Opposition Result	Rank
Kevin Vleermuis	−57 kg	Bye	E Welson (NGR); L 0–10 ^{ST}	Did not advance	Bye	C Ansari (MAR); L 0–10 ^{ST}	5

Men's Greco-Roman

Athlete	Event	Group stages		Final / BM	
Athlete	Event	Opposition Score	Standing	Opposition Score	Rank
Romio Goliath	−60 kg	Group A J Ibanda (COD): L 0–9 ^{ST} I Robinson (NGR): L 8–17 ^{SP} A Laouni (ALG): L 0–9 ^{ST}	4	Did not advance	6

== See also ==
- Namibia at the African Games
