= Namibia at the 2000 Summer Olympics =

- IOC code: NAM
- NOC: Namibian National Olympic Committee

in Sydney
- Competitors: 11 in 6 sports
- Flag bearer: Paulus Ali Nuumbembe
- Medals: Gold 0 Silver 0 Bronze 0 Total 0

Summer Olympics appearances (overview)
- 1992; 1996; 2000; 2004; 2008; 2012; 2016; 2020; 2024

Namibia was represented at the 2000 Summer Olympics in Sydney, New South Wales, Australia by the Namibian National Olympic Committee.

In total, 11 athletes including nine men and two women represented Namibia in six different sports including athletics, boxing, cycling, gymnastics, shooting and swimming.

This was the first Olympics since Namibia made their debut at the 1992 Summer Olympics in Barcelona, Spain that they did not win a medal.

== Background ==
Namibia made their Olympic debut at the 1992 Summer Olympics in Barcelona, Spain. At both previous Olympic appearances – in 1992 and the subsequent 1996 Summer Olympics in Atlanta, Georgia, United States – Namibia had won two silver medals.

== Competitors ==
In total, 11 athletes represented Namibia at the 2000 Summer Olympics in Sydney, New South Wales, Australia across six different sports.

Sport	Men	Women	Total
Athletics	5	1	6
Boxing	1	–	1
Cycling	1	0	1
Gymnastics	0	1	1
Shooting	1	0	1
Swimming	1	0	1
Total	9	2	11

== Athletics ==
In total, six Namibian athletes participated in the athletics events – Stephan Louw in the men's long jump, Elizabeth Mongudhi in the women's marathon, Willie Smith in the men's 400 m hurdles, Luketz Swartbooi men's marathon, Sherwin Vries in the men's 100 m and Christie van Wyk in the men's 200 m.

Men
Track & road events

Athletes	Events	Heat Round 1		Heat Round 2		Semifinal		Final	
Athletes	Events	Time	Rank	Time	Rank	Time	Rank	Time	Rank
Willie Smith	400 m hurdles	50.89	35	did not advance					
Luketz Swartbooi	Marathon	N/A						2:22:55	48
Sherwin Vries	100 metres	10.53	53	did not advance					
Christie van Wyk	200 metres	46.57	65	did not advance					

Field events

Athlete	Event	Qualification		Final	
Athlete	Event	Distance	Position	Distance	Position
Stephan Louw	Long jump	NM		did not advance	

Women

Athletes	Events	Heat Round 1		Heat Round 2		Semifinal		Final	
Athletes	Events	Time	Rank	Time	Rank	Time	Rank	Time	Rank
Elizabeth Mongudhi	Marathon	—						DNF	

== Boxing ==
In total, one Namibian athlete participated in the boxing events – Paulus Ali Nuumbembe in the welterweight category.

Athlete	Event	Round of 32	Round of 16	Quarterfinals	Semifinals	Final	
Athlete	Event	Opposition Result	Opposition Result	Opposition Result	Opposition Result	Opposition Result	Rank
Paulus Ali Nuumbembe	Welterweight	Daniyar Munaytbasov (KAZ); L 2-14	did not advance				

== Cycling ==
In total, one Namibian athlete participated in the cycling events – Mannie Heymans in the men's cross-country.

Athlete	Event	Time	Rank
Mannie Heymans	Men's cross-country	2:20:31.94	26

== Gymnastics ==
In total, one Namibian athlete participated in the gymnastics events – Gharde Geldenhuys in the women's artistic individual all-around.

Athlete	Event	Qualification						Final					
Athlete	Event	Apparatus				Total	Rank	Apparatus				Total	Rank
Athlete	Event	V	UB	BB	F	Total	Rank	V	UB	BB	F	Total	Rank
Gharde Geldenhuys	Individual all-around	8.537	7.662	7.762	8.575	32.536	64	—					

== Shooting ==
In total, one Namibian athletes participated in the shooting events – Friedhelm Sack in the men's 10 m air pistol and the men's 50 metre pistol.

Athlete	Events	Qualification		Final		Total	
Athlete	Events	Score	Rank	Score	Rank	Score	Rank
Friedhelm Sack	10 metre air pistol	565	34	Did not advance			
Friedhelm Sack	50 metre pistol	543	32	Did not advance			

== Swimming ==
In total, one Namibian athlete participated in the swimming events – Jörg Lindemeier in the men's 100 m breaststroke.

Athletes	Events	Heat		Finals	
Athletes	Events	Time	Rank	Time	Rank
Jörg Lindemeier	100 m breaststroke	1:05.25	49	Did not advance	
