= Namibia at the 2004 Summer Olympics =

- IOC code: NAM
- NOC: Namibian National Olympic Committee

in Athens
- Competitors: 8 in 5 sports
- Flag bearer: Paulus Ambunda
- Medals: Gold 0 Silver 0 Bronze 0 Total 0

Summer Olympics appearances (overview)
- 1992; 1996; 2000; 2004; 2008; 2012; 2016; 2020; 2024

Namibia competed at the 2004 Summer Olympics in Athens, Greece, from 13 to 29 August 2004. This was the nation's fourth consecutive appearance at the Olympics.

Namibian National Olympic Committee sent a total of eight athletes to the Games, seven men and one woman, to compete in 5 sports. Three of them had previously competed in Sydney, including pistol shooter Friedhelm Sack and mountain biker Mannie Heymans. Sprinter and four-time Olympic silver medalist Frankie Fredericks sought his official comeback to the Games after an eight-year absence with the hopes of adding another medal to his career hardware. Flyweight boxer Paulus Ambunda was appointed by the committee to become the nation's flag bearer in the opening ceremony.

Namibia, however, failed to win a single Olympic medal for the second consecutive time since the previous Games. Being a top favorite for the Namibian team, Fredericks fell short of claiming his third medal in the 200 metres, and thereby missed a chance to climb into the podium on his final Olympic appearance. On August 29, 2004, at the time of the closing ceremony, Fredericks was elected to the IOC Athletes' Commission, along with three other athletes.

== Athletics ==
Namibian athletes have so far achieved qualifying standards in the following athletics events (up to a maximum of 3 athletes in each event at the 'A' Standard, and 1 at the 'B' Standard).

Key

- Note–Ranks given for track events are within the athlete's heat only
- Q = Qualified for the next round
- q = Qualified for the next round as a fastest loser or, in field events, by position without achieving the qualifying target
- NR = National record
- N/A = Round not applicable for the event
- Bye = Athlete not required to compete in round

Men

Athlete	Event	Heat		Quarterfinal		Semifinal		Final	
Athlete	Event	Result	Rank	Result	Rank	Result	Rank	Result	Rank
Frankie Fredericks	100 m	10.12	1 Q	10.17	4	did not advance			
Frankie Fredericks	200 m	20.54	1 Q	20.20	2 Q	20.43	3 Q	20.14	4
Christie van Wyk	100 m	10.49	5	did not advance					

Women

Athlete	Event	Heat		Semifinal		Final	
Athlete	Event	Result	Rank	Result	Rank	Result	Rank
Agnes Samaria	800 m	2:00.05	2 Q	1:59.37	5	did not advance	

== Boxing ==
Namibia sent two boxers to Athens. Both received a bye in the round of 32, both won their match in the round of 16, and both were defeated in the quarterfinals.

Athlete	Event	Round of 32	Round of 16	Quarterfinals	Semifinals	Final	
Athlete	Event	Opposition Result	Opposition Result	Opposition Result	Opposition Result	Opposition Result	Rank
Joseph Jermia	Light flyweight	Bye	Wakefield (AUS); W 29–20	Kazakov (RUS); L 11–18	did not advance		
Paulus Ambunda	Flyweight	Bye	Mendoza (VEN); W 39–19	Rahimov (GER); L 15–28	did not advance		

== Cycling ==
=== Mountain biking ===
Athlete	Event	Time	Rank
Mannie Heymans	Men's cross-country	2:28:28	29

== Shooting ==
Namibian has qualified a single shooter.

Men

Athlete	Event	Qualification		Final	
Athlete	Event	Points	Rank	Points	Rank
Friedhelm Sack	10 m air pistol	572	=33	did not advance	
Friedhelm Sack	50 m pistol	529	=41	did not advance	

== Wrestling ==
Key

- VT - Victory by Fall.
- PP - Decision by Points - the loser with technical points.
- PO - Decision by Points - the loser without technical points.

Men's freestyle

Athlete	Event	Elimination Pool			Quarterfinal	Semifinal	Final / BM	
Athlete	Event	Opposition Result	Opposition Result	Rank	Opposition Result	Opposition Result	Opposition Result	Rank
Nico Jacobs	−96 kg	Aghayev (AZE); L 0–5 ^{VT}	Bairamukov (KAZ); L 1–3 ^{PP}	3	did not advance			18

== See also ==
- Namibia at the 2004 Summer Paralympics
