= Namibia at the 2012 Summer Olympics =

- IOC code: NAM
- NOC: Namibian National Olympic Committee

in London
- Competitors: 9 in 5 sports
- Flag bearers: Gaby Ahrens (opening); Sem Shilimela (closing)
- Medals: Gold 0 Silver 0 Bronze 0 Total 0

Summer Olympics appearances (overview)
- 1992; 1996; 2000; 2004; 2008; 2012; 2016; 2020; 2024

Namibia competed at the 2012 Summer Olympics in London, United Kingdom from July 27 to August 12, 2012. This was the nation's sixth consecutive appearance at the Olympics.

Namibian National Olympic Committee sent a total of 9 athletes to the Games, 5 men and 4 women, to compete in 5 sports. Three Namibian athletes had competed in Beijing, including marathon runner Beata Naigambo, the oldest member of the team, at age 32, and trap shooter Gaby Ahrens, who became the nation's first female flag bearer at the opening ceremony. Namibia also marked its Olympic return in freestyle wrestling after an eight-year absence.

Namibia, however, failed to win a single Olympic medal for the fourth consecutive time.

== Background ==
Namibia made its debut at the 1992 Summer Olympics in Barcelona and appeared at all subsequent Games before the 2012 Summer Olympics in London - the country's sixth Olympics. Namibia sent its greatest number of athletes - 11 - to the 2000 Summer Olympics in Sydney. The country's most successful athlete is 100 and 200 metres runner Frankie Fredericks who won silver in both disciplines at Namibia's inaugural Olympics in Barcelona in 1992, and at the Atlanta Olympics four years later. Fredericks, the only Namibian athlete to win an Olympic medal as of 2012, missed the Sydney Olympics in 2000 due to an Achilles injury and was unsuccessful in his attempts to win further medals at his final Olympics in Athens in 2004.

Nine athletes were selected by Namibia to participate at the 2012 Olympics. Trap shooter Gaby Ahrens bore the flag for the country at the opening ceremony of the Games. She was joined in the Namibian Olympic team by cyclists Marc Bassingthwaighte and Dan Craven; runners Tjipekapora Herunga, Helalia Johannes and Beata Naigambo; boxers Mujandjae Kasuto and Jonas Matheus; and wrestler Naatele Sem Shilimela.

== Athletics ==
Namibian athletes have so far achieved qualifying standards in the following athletics events (up to a maximum of 3 athletes in each event at the 'A' Standard, and 1 at the 'B' Standard):

Key

- Note–Ranks given for track events are within the athlete's heat only
- Q = Qualified for the next round
- q = Qualified for the next round as a fastest loser or, in field events, by position without achieving the qualifying target
- NR = National record
- N/A = Round not applicable for the event
- Bye = Athlete not required to compete in round

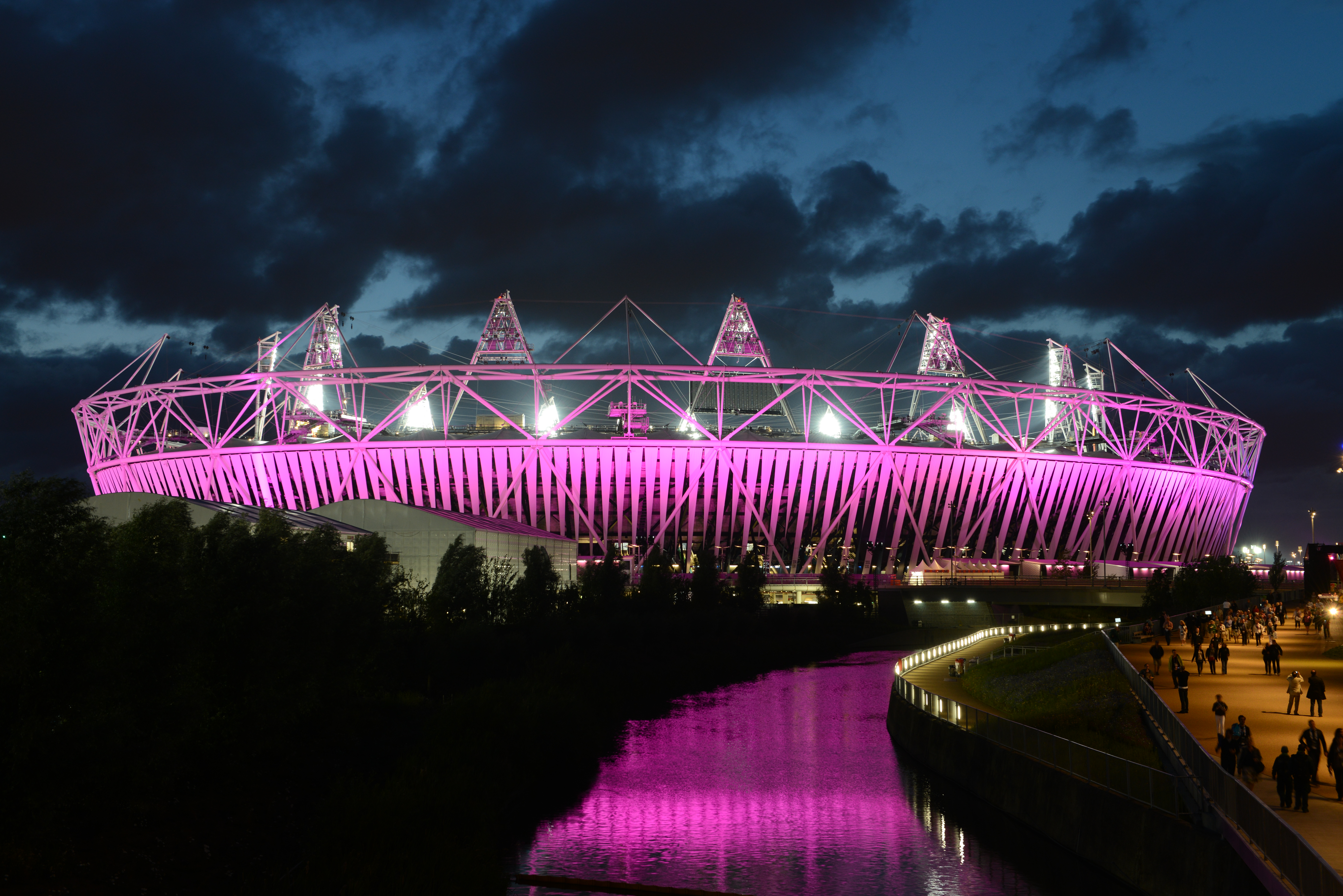
The London Olympic Stadium, where athletics events took place.

Women

| Athlete | Event | Heat | | Semifinal | | Final | |
| Athlete | Event | Result | Rank | Result | Rank | Result | Rank |
|---|---|---|---|---|---|---|---|
| Tjipekapora Herunga | 400 m | 52.31 | 3 Q | 52.53 | 6 | Did not advance | |
| Helalia Johannes | Marathon | — | | | | 2:26:09 | 12 |
| Beata Naigambo | Marathon | — | | | | 2:31:16 | 38 |

== Boxing ==
Namibia has qualified two boxers.

Men

| Athlete | Event | Round of 32 | Round of 16 | Quarterfinals | Semifinals | Final | |
| Athlete | Event | Opposition Result | Opposition Result | Opposition Result | Opposition Result | Opposition Result | Rank |
|---|---|---|---|---|---|---|---|
| Jonas Matheus | Bantamweight | Parrinello (ITA); L 7–18 | Did not advance | | | | |
| Mujandjae Kasuto | Middleweight | Nazarov (TJK); W 11–8 | Harcsa (HUN); L 7–16 | Did not advance | | | |

== Cycling ==
Namibia has qualified the following cyclists for the Games.

=== Road ===
| Athlete | Event | Time | Rank |
|---|---|---|---|
| Dan Craven | Men's road race | Did not finish | |

=== Mountain biking ===
| Athlete | Event | Time | Rank |
|---|---|---|---|
| Marc Bassingthwaighte | Men's cross-country | 1:37:17 | 30 |

== Shooting ==
Namibia has earned one quota place for shooting events;

Women

| Athlete | Event | Qualification | | Final | |
| Athlete | Event | Points | Rank | Points | Rank |
|---|---|---|---|---|---|
| Gaby Ahrens | Trap | 59 | 22 | Did not advance | |

== Wrestling ==
Sem Shilimela represented Namibia in London. Shilimela received a bye into the last 16, where he faced Dzhamal Otarsultanov of Russia, losing 0–3 on points. Shilimela received a bye through the first round of the repechage, then again lost 0–3 on points to North Korean Yang Kyong-il in the second round.

Key:

- VT - Victory by Fall.
- PP - Decision by Points - the loser with technical points.
- PO - Decision by Points - the loser without technical points.

Men's freestyle

| Athlete | Event | Qualification | Round of 16 | Quarterfinal | Semifinal | Repechage 1 | Repechage 2 | Final / BM | |
| Athlete | Event | Opposition Result | Opposition Result | Opposition Result | Opposition Result | Opposition Result | Opposition Result | Opposition Result | Rank |
|---|---|---|---|---|---|---|---|---|---|
| Sem Shilimela | −55 kg | Bye | Otarsultanov (RUS); L 0–3 ^{PO} | Did not advance | | Bye | Yang K-I (PRK); L 0–3 ^{PO} | Did not advance | 15 |
