= Namibia at the 2008 Summer Olympics =

- IOC code: NAM
- NOC: Namibian National Olympic Committee

in Beijing
- Competitors: 10 in 4 sports
- Flag bearer: Mannie Heymans
- Medals: Gold 0 Silver 0 Bronze 0 Total 0

Summer Olympics appearances (overview)
- 1992; 1996; 2000; 2004; 2008; 2012; 2016; 2020; 2024

Namibia competed at the 2008 Summer Olympics in Beijing, People's Republic of China.

== Athletics ==
Beata Naigambo received a qualifying berth for the Olympics after winning the Nedbank South African Marathon Championships. Hilaria Johannes also qualified. Agnes Samaria and Stephan Louw still need to get through the selection process.

Key

- Note–Ranks given for track events are within the athlete's heat only
- Q = Qualified for the next round
- q = Qualified for the next round as a fastest loser or, in field events, by position without achieving the qualifying target
- NR = National record
- N/A = Round not applicable for the event
- Bye = Athlete not required to compete in round

Men

Athlete	Event	Qualification		Final	
Athlete	Event	Distance	Position	Distance	Position
Stephan Louw	Long jump	7.93	13	Did not advance	

Women

Athlete	Event	Heat		Semifinal		Final	
Athlete	Event	Result	Rank	Result	Rank	Result	Rank
Helalia Johannes	Marathon	—				2:35:22	40
Beata Naigambo	Marathon	—				2:33:29	28
Agnes Samaria	800 m	2:02.18	5	Did not advance			
Agnes Samaria	1500 m	4:15.80	7	—		Did not advance	

== Boxing ==
Jafet Uutoni won a gold medal in the first leg of the Olympic qualifiers for African states in Algiers, Algeria. At the second round of qualification, which was held in Namibia, fellow Namibians Mujandjae Kasuto (gold medal, welterweight) and Julius Indongo (bronze medal, lightweight) also qualified for the games.

Athlete	Event	Round of 32	Round of 16	Quarterfinals	Semifinals	Final	
Athlete	Event	Opposition Result	Opposition Result	Opposition Result	Opposition Result	Opposition Result	Rank
Jafet Uutoni	Light flyweight	Bye	Maszczyk (POL); L 5–5^{+}	Did not advance			
Julius Indongo	Lightweight	Little (AUS); L 2–14	Did not advance				
Mujandjae Kasuto	Welterweight	Balanov (RUS); L 5–8	Did not advance				

== Cycling ==
Eric Hoffman and Mannie Heymans qualified.

=== Road ===
Athlete	Event	Time	Rank
Eric Hoffman	Men's road race	6:26:17	21

=== Mountain biking ===
Athlete	Event	Time	Rank
Mannie Heymans	Men's cross-country	LAP (3 laps)	45

== Shooting ==
Gaby Ahrens qualified for the Trap women's competition

Women

Athlete	Event	Qualification		Final	
Athlete	Event	Points	Rank	Points	Rank
Gaby Ahrens	Trap	52	20	Did not advance	
