= Namibia at the 2020 Summer Olympics =

- IOC code: NAM
- NOC: Namibian National Olympic Committee

in Tokyo, Japan July 23, 2021 – August 8, 2021
- Competitors: 11 in 5 sports
- Flag bearers (opening): Maike Diekmann; Jonas Junius
- Flag bearer (closing): Beatrice Masilingi
- Medals Ranked 77th: Gold 0 Silver 1 Bronze 0 Total 1

Summer Olympics appearances (overview)
- 1992; 1996; 2000; 2004; 2008; 2012; 2016; 2020; 2024; 2028

Namibia competed at the 2020 Summer Olympics in Tokyo. Originally scheduled to take place from 24 July to 9 August 2020, the Games were postponed to 23 July to 8 August 2021, because of the COVID-19 pandemic. It was the nation's eighth consecutive appearance at the Summer Olympics.

== Medalists ==
Medal	Name	Sport	Event	Date
Silver	Christine Mboma	Athletics	Women's 200 metres	August 3

== Competitors ==
The following is the list of number of competitors in the Games.

Sport	Men	Women	Total
Athletics	1	3	4
Boxing	1	0	1
Cycling	2	2	4
Rowing	0	1	1
Swimming	1	0	1
Total	5	6	11

== Athletics ==
Namibian athletes achieved the entry standards, either by qualifying time or by world ranking, in the following track and field events (up to a maximum of 3 athletes in each event):

Key

- Note–Ranks given for track events are within the athlete's heat only
- Q = Qualified for the next round
- q = Qualified for the next round as a fastest loser or, in field events, by position without achieving the qualifying target
- NR = National record
- N/A = Round not applicable for the event
- Bye = Athlete not required to compete in round

Track & road events

Athlete	Event	Heat		Semifinal		Final	
Athlete	Event	Result	Rank	Result	Rank	Result	Rank
Tomas Hilifa Rainhold	Men's marathon	—N/a				2:18:28	42
Beatrice Masilingi	Women's 200 m	22.63	2 Q	22.40	2 Q	22.28	6
Christine Mboma	Women's 200 m	22.11 NR	1 Q	21.97 NR	2 Q	21.81 NR	2nd place, silver medalist(s)
Helalia Johannes	Women's marathon	—N/a				2:31:22	11

== Boxing ==
Namibia entered one boxer into the Olympic tournament. Rio 2016 Olympian Jonas Junius scored an outright semifinal victory to secure a spot in the men's lightweight division at the 2020 African Qualification Tournament in Diamniadio, Senegal.

Athlete	Event	Round of 32	Round of 16	Quarterfinals	Semifinals	Final	
Athlete	Event	Opposition Result	Opposition Result	Opposition Result	Opposition Result	Opposition Result	Rank
Jonas Junius	Men's lightweight	Bye	Garside (AUS); L 0–5	Did not advance			

== Cycling ==
=== Road ===
Namibia entered one rider (Dan Craven) to compete in the men's Olympic road race, by finishing in the top two, not yet qualified, at the 2019 African Championships in Addis Ababa, Ethiopia. He was replaced by Tristan de Lange after Craven tested positive for Covid-19. An additional spot was awarded to a Namibian cyclist in the women's road race by virtue of a top 100 individual finish in the UCI World Ranking.

Athlete	Event	Time	Rank
Tristan de Lange	Men's road race	Did not finish	
Vera Looser	Women's road race	Did not finish	

=== Mountain biking ===
Namibia entered one rider each to compete in both men's and women's cross-country race, respectively, by virtue of their best individual ranking at the 2019 African Championships.

Athlete	Event	Time	Rank
Alex Miller	Men's cross-country	1:34:26	31
Michelle Vorster	Women's cross-country	LAP (3 laps)	36

== Rowing ==
Namibia qualified one boat in the women's single sculls for the Games by winning the gold medal and securing the first of five berths available at the 2019 FISA African Olympic Qualification Regatta in Tunis, Tunisia, marking the country's debut in the sport.

Athlete	Event	Heats		Repechage		Quarterfinals		Semifinals		Final	
Athlete	Event	Time	Rank	Time	Rank	Time	Rank	Time	Rank	Time	Rank
Maike Diekmann	Women's single sculls	7:56.37	3 QF	Bye		8:21.69	5 SC/D	7:40.77	3 FC	7:52.17	18

Qualification Legend: FA=Final A (medal); FB=Final B (non-medal); FC=Final C (non-medal); FD=Final D (non-medal); FE=Final E (non-medal); FF=Final F (non-medal); SA/B=Semifinals A/B; SC/D=Semifinals C/D; SE/F=Semifinals E/F; QF=Quarterfinals; R=Repechage

== Swimming ==
Namibia entered one swimmer to compete at the Games for the first time since Sydney 2000. Phillip Seidler finished fourteenth in the men's 10 km open water to secure the remaining slot for Africa at the 2021 FINA Olympic Marathon Swim Qualifier in Setúbal, Portugal.

Athlete	Event	Final	
Athlete	Event	Time	Rank
Phillip Seidler	Men's 10 km open water	1:53:14.1	16

== See also ==
- Namibia at the 2020 Summer Paralympics
