= Namibia at the 2024 Summer Olympics =

- IOC code: NAM
- NOC: Namibian National Olympic Committee

in Paris, France 26 July 2024 – 11 August 2024
- Competitors: 4 (2 men and 2 women) in 3 sports
- Flag bearers: Alex Miller & Vera Looser
- Medals: Gold 0 Silver 0 Bronze 0 Total 0

Summer Olympics appearances (overview)
- 1992; 1996; 2000; 2004; 2008; 2012; 2016; 2020; 2024; 2028

Namibia competed at the 2024 Summer Olympics in Paris from 26 July to 11 August 2024. It was the nation's ninth consecutive appearance at the Summer Olympics, since the nation's official debut at 1992.

In what was widely seen as a "poor representation", Namibia only sent four athletes to the 2024 Games and won no medals. A former Athletics Namibia (AN) president blamed the country's bad performance on a lack of proper preparation, opining that athletics in Namibia "is kind of a hobby" due to a lack of sports development programmes.

== Competitors ==
The following is the list of number of competitors in the Games.

Sport	Men	Women	Total
Athletics	0	1	1
Cycling	1	1	2
Swimming	1	0	1
Total	2	2	4

== Athletics ==
Namibian track and field athletes qualified for Paris 2024, by receiving the direct universality spots in the following event:

Key

- Note–Ranks given for track events are within the athlete's heat only
- Q = Qualified for the next round
- q = Qualified for the next round as a fastest loser or, in field events, by position without achieving the qualifying target
- NR = National record
- N/A = Round not applicable for the event
- Bye = Athlete not required to compete in round

Track and road events

Athlete	Event	Final	
Athlete	Event	Result	Rank
Helalia Johannes	Women's marathon	2:38:36	68

== Cycling ==
=== Road ===
Namibia entered one female cyclist to compete in the road race events at the Olympic, through the establishment of UCI Nation Ranking.

Athlete	Event	Time	Rank
Vera Looser	Women's road race	4:10:47	68

=== Mountain biking ===
Namibian mountain bikers secured one male quota place for the Olympic through the 2023 African Championships in Johannesburg, South Africa.

Athlete	Event	Time	Rank
Alex Miller	Men's cross-country	DNF	

== Swimming ==
Namibian swimmers achieved the entry standards in the following events for Paris 2024 (a maximum of two swimmers under the Olympic Qualifying Time (OST) and potentially at the Olympic Consideration Time (OCT)):

Men

Athlete	Event	Heat		Semifinal		Final	
Athlete	Event	Time	Rank	Time	Rank	Time	Rank
Phillip Seidler	10 km open water	—N/a				DNF	
