= Namibia at the 1992 Summer Olympics =

- IOC code: NAM
- NOC: Namibian National Olympic Committee

in Barcelona
- Competitors: 6 in 3 sports
- Flag bearer: Frankie Fredericks
- Medals Ranked 41st: Gold 0 Silver 2 Bronze 0 Total 2

Summer Olympics appearances (overview)
- 1992; 1996; 2000; 2004; 2008; 2012; 2016; 2020; 2024; 2028

Namibia competed in the Olympic Games for the first time at the 1992 Summer Olympics in Barcelona, Spain.

== Medalists ==
Medal	Name	Sport	Event	Date
Silver	Frankie Fredericks	Athletics	Men's 100 metres	1 August
Silver	Frankie Fredericks	Athletics	Men's 200 metres	6 August

== Competitors ==
The following is the list of number of competitors in the Games.

Sport	Men	Women	Total
Athletics	3	0	3
Boxing	1	–	1
Swimming	1	1	2
Total	5	1	6

== Athletics ==
Men
Track & road events

Athlete	Event	Heat		Quarterfinal		Semifinal		Final	
Athlete	Event	Result	Rank	Result	Rank	Result	Rank	Result	Rank
Frankie Fredericks	100 m	10.29	1 Q	10.13	1 Q	10.17	1 Q	10.02	Silver medal
Frankie Fredericks	200 m	20.74	1 Q	20.02	1 Q	20.14	1 Q	20.13	Silver medal
Tuihaleni Kayele	Marathon	—N/a						2:31.41	69
Luketz Swartbooi	Marathon	—N/a						DNF	

== Boxing ==
Men

Athlete	Event	1 Round	2 Round	3 Round	Quarterfinals	Semifinals	Final
Athlete	Event	Opposition Result	Opposition Result	Opposition Result	Opposition Result	Opposition Result	Rank
Harry Simon	Welterweight	Aníbal Acevedo (PUR); L 11-13	did not advance				

== Swimming ==
Men

Athlete	Event	Heat		Final B		Final	
Athlete	Event	Time	Rank	Time	Rank	Time	Rank
Jörg Lindemeier	100 m breaststroke	1:06.34	43	did not advance			
Jörg Lindemeier	200 m breaststroke	2:24.88	40	did not advance			

Women

Athlete	Event	Heat		Final B		Final	
Athlete	Event	Time	Rank	Time	Rank	Time	Rank
Monica Dahl	50 m freestyle	27.45	37	did not advance			
Monica Dahl	100 m freestyle	59.05	35	did not advance			
Monica Dahl	100 m butterfly	1:06.58	46	did not advance			

== Sources ==
- Official Olympic Reports
- International Olympic Committee results database
