= Namibia at the 1996 Summer Olympics =

- IOC code: NAM
- NOC: Namibian National Olympic Committee

in Atlanta
- Competitors: 8 in 4 sports
- Flag bearer: Friedhelm Sack
- Medals Ranked 55th: Gold 0 Silver 2 Bronze 0 Total 2

Summer Olympics appearances (overview)
- 1992; 1996; 2000; 2004; 2008; 2012; 2016; 2020; 2024

Namibia competed at the 1996 Summer Olympics in Atlanta, United States.

== Medalists ==
Medal	Name	Sport	Event	Date
Silver	Frankie Fredericks	Athletics	Men's 100 metres	27 July
Silver	Frankie Fredericks	Athletics	Men's 200 metres	1 August

== Competitors ==
The following is the list of number of competitors in the Games.

Sport	Men	Women	Total
Athletics	2	1	3
Boxing	2	–	2
Shooting	1	0	1
Swimming	1	1	2
Total	6	2	8

== Athletics ==
=== Men ===
Track and road events

Athletes	Events	Heat Round 1		Heat Round 2		Semifinal		Final	
Athletes	Events	Time	Rank	Time	Rank	Time	Rank	Time	Rank
Frankie Fredericks	100 metres	10.32	21 Q	9.93	1 Q	9.94	2 Q	9.89	Silver medal
Frankie Fredericks	200 metres	20.59	14 Q	20.38	4 Q	19.98	1 Q	19.68	Silver medal
Joseph Tjitunga	Marathon	N/A						2:27:52	76

=== Women ===
Track and road events

Athletes	Events	Heat Round 1		Heat Round 2		Semifinal		Final	
Athletes	Events	Time	Rank	Time	Rank	Time	Rank	Time	Rank
Elizabeth Mongudhi	Marathon	N/A						2:56:19	59

== Boxing ==
=== Men ===
Athlete	Event	Round of 32	Round of 16	Quarterfinal	Semifinal	Final
Athlete	Event	Opposition Result	Opposition Result	Opposition Result	Opposition Result	Opposition Result
Joseph Benhard	Light-flyweight	Lozano (ESP); L 10-2	Did not advance			
Sackey Shivute	Middleweight	Crawford (AUS); L 12-3	Did not advance			

== Shooting ==
=== Men ===
Athlete	Events	Qualification		Final		Total	
Athlete	Events	Score	Rank	Score	Rank	Score	Rank
Friedhelm Sack	10 metre air pistol	583	=5	97.2	7	680.2	8

== Swimming ==
=== Men ===
Athletes	Events	Heat		Finals	
Athletes	Events	Time	Rank	Time	Rank
Jörg Lindemeier	100 m breaststroke	1:05.50	35	Did not advance	

=== Women ===
Athletes	Events	Heat		Finals	
Athletes	Events	Time	Rank	Time	Rank
Monica Dahl	50 m freestyle	26.76	36	Did not advance	
Monica Dahl	100 m freestyle	57.95	32	Did not advance	
