= Namibia at the 2003 All-Africa Games =

- IOC code: NAM
- NOC: Namibian National Olympic Committee

in Abuja 5 October 2003 – 17 October 2003
- Medals Ranked 22nd: Gold 0 Silver 3 Bronze 4 Total 7

All-Africa Games appearances
- 1991; 1995; 1999; 2003; 2007; 2011; 2015; 2019; 2023

Namibia competed in the 2003 All-Africa Games held at the National Stadium in the city of Abuja. It was the fourth time that the country had sent a team to the Games since gaining independence and the team left with seven medals. Amongst the medal winners was Frank Fredericks, who gained silver in the men's 200 metres.

== Competitors ==
Namibia sent a substantial team to the Games and entered thirty six sports, of which fourteen were for men and twenty two for women. Amongst the competitors was Frank Fredericks who was given treatment usually limited to superstars. Contemporary media quoted him saying that he was in Abuja "to win and to have fun." He finished the competition with a silver medal.

== Medal summary ==
Namibia won seven medals in total and came 22nd in the medal table. The team won no gold medals and the total was nearly half the total of the country’s debut at the 1991 Games and more than double the number at the following 2007 Games.

=== Medal table ===
Sport	Gold	Silver	Bronze	Total
Athletics	0	1	0	1
Boxing	0	1	1	2
Cycling	0	1	0	1
Gymnastics	0	0	2	2
Wrestling	0	0	1	1
Total	0	3	4	7

== List of Medalists ==
=== Silver Medal ===
Medal	Name	Sport	Event	Date	Ref
Silver	Frankie Fredericks	Athletics	Men's 200m	14 October	
Silver	Paulus Ambunda	Boxing	Men's Flyweight 51 kg	11 October	
Silver	Erik Hoffmann	Cycling	Men´s Time Trial	14 October	

=== Bronze Medal ===
Medal	Name	Sport	Event	Date	Ref
Bronze	Joseph Jermia	Boxing	Men's Light Flyweight 48 kg	9 October	
Bronze	Kimberly-Ann van Zyl; Lorraine Moore; Romona Beukes; Geraldine Stuurman; Alexa Jacobs	Gymnastics	Women’s Team	6 October	
Bronze	Nico Jacobs	Wrestling	Men's Freestyle 96 kg	9 October	

== See also ==
- Namibia at the African Games
