= Cameroon at the 1992 Summer Olympics =

- IOC code: CMR
- NOC: Cameroon Olympic and Sports Committee

in Barcelona
- Competitors: 8 (3 men and 5 women) in 2 sports
- Medals: Gold 0 Silver 0 Bronze 0 Total 0

Summer Olympics appearances (overview)
- 1964; 1968; 1972; 1976; 1980; 1984; 1988; 1992; 1996; 2000; 2004; 2008; 2012; 2016; 2020; 2024

Cameroon competed at the 1992 Summer Olympics in Barcelona, Spain.

== Competitors ==
The following is the list of number of competitors in the Games.

Sport	Men	Women	Total
Athletics	2	5	7
Weightlifting	1	–	1
Total	3	5	8

== Athletics ==
Men
Track and road events

Athlete	Event	Heats		Quarterfinal		Semifinal		Final	
Athlete	Event	Result	Rank	Result	Rank	Result	Rank	Result	Rank
Samuel Nchinda-Kaya	100 metres	10.41	11 Q	10.58	27	Did not advance			
Samuel Nchinda-Kaya	200 metres	21.50	41	Did not advance					
Paul Kuété	Marathon	—						2:22:43	46

Women
Track and road events

Athlete	Event	Heats		Quarterfinal		Semifinal		Final	
Athlete	Event	Result	Rank	Result	Rank	Result	Rank	Result	Rank
Monique Kengné	100 metres	12.12	43	Did not advance					
Georgette N'Koma	200 metres	23.85	29 q	24.06	30	Did not advance			
Susie Tanéfo	400 metres	53.37	21 q	53.78	28	Did not advance			
Louisette Thobi	100 metres hurdles	14.37	34	Did not advance					
Myriam Mani; Georgette N'Koma; Monique Kengné; Louisette Thobi	4 × 100 metres relay	44.97	13	—				Did not advance	

== Weightlifting ==
Athlete	Event	Snatch		Clean & jerk		Total	Rank
Athlete	Event	Result	Rank	Result	Rank	Total	Rank
Alphonse Hercule Matam	82.5 kg	137.5	24	170.0	23	307.5	24

== Sources ==
- Official Olympic Reports
- sports-reference
