= Athletics at the 1991 Summer Universiade – Women's 100 metres =

The women's 100 metres event at the 1991 Summer Universiade was held at the Don Valley Stadium in Sheffield on 20 and 21 July 1991.

== Medalists ==
| Gold | Silver | Bronze |
|---|---|---|
| Chryste Gaines; United States | Anita Howard; United States | Sølvi Olsen; Norway |

== Results ==
=== Heats ===
Wind:
Heat 1: +1.3 m/s, Heat 2: +2.6 m/s, Heat 3: +2.8 m/s, Heat 4: +2.0 m/s, Heat 5: +1.3 m/s

| Rank | Heat | Athlete | Nationality | Time | Notes |
|---|---|---|---|---|---|
| 1 | 2 | Wang Huei-chen | Chinese Taipei | 11.44 | Q |
| 2 | 4 | Chryste Gaines | United States | 11.49 | Q |
| 3 | 2 | Melissa Moore | Australia | 11.54 | Q |
| 4 | 5 | Mary Tombiri | Nigeria | 11.66 | Q |
| 5 | 4 | Sølvi Olsen | Norway | 11.67 | Q |
| 6 | 1 | Anita Howard | United States | 11.69 | Q |
| 7 | 2 | Christine Bloomfield | Great Britain | 11.80 | Q |
| 8 | 1 | Laura Ardissone | Italy | 11.84 | Q |
| 9 | 1 | Laurentia Hurmuz | Romania | 11.85 | Q |
| 9 | 5 | Idalmis Bonne | Cuba | 11.85 | Q |
| 11 | 3 | Chantal Brunner | New Zealand | 11.90 | Q |
| 12 | 4 | Annarita Balzani | Italy | 11.91 | Q |
| 13 | 3 | Melanie Neef | Great Britain | 11.92 | Q |
| 14 | 2 | Aïda Diop | Senegal | 12.07 | Q |
| 15 | 5 | Cristina Martín | Spain | 12.11 | Q |
| 16 | 2 | Begoña Yúdice | Spain | 12.15 | q |
| 17 | 2 | Louisette Thobi | Cameroon | 12.22 | q |
| 18 | 4 | Kuan Yuh-hsiu | Chinese Taipei | 12.59 | Q |
| 19 | 4 | Jacqueline Solíz | Bolivia | 12.85 | q |
| 20 | 3 | Fan Yuk | Hong Kong | 12.91 | Q |
| 21 | 1 | May Sardouk | Lebanon | 13.10 | Q |
| 22 | 5 | Marina Bonello | Malta | 13.52 | Q |
| 23 | 1 | Farhad Jasmin Liti | Bangladesh | 14.00 | q |

=== Quarterfinals ===
Wind:
Heat 1: +2.8 m/s, Heat 2: +3.1 m/s, Heat 3: +4.3 m/s

| Rank | Heat | Athlete | Nationality | Time | Notes |
|---|---|---|---|---|---|
| 1 | 1 | Chryste Gaines | United States | 11.31 | Q |
| 2 | 3 | Wang Huei-chen | Chinese Taipei | 11.38 | Q |
| 3 | 3 | Sølvi Olsen | Norway | 11.41 | Q |
| 4 | 2 | Anita Howard | United States | 11.48 | Q |
| 5 | 3 | Melissa Moore | Australia | 11.49 | Q |
| 6 | 3 | Laurentia Hurmuz | Romania | 11.55 | Q |
| 7 | 2 | Mary Tombiri | Nigeria | 11.59 | Q |
| 8 | 2 | Idalmis Bonne | Cuba | 11.67 | Q |
| 9 | 3 | Annarita Balzani | Italy | 11.69 | Q |
| 10 | 1 | Laura Ardissone | Italy | 11.73 | Q |
| 11 | 1 | Christine Bloomfield | Great Britain | 11.74 | Q |
| 12 | 2 | Melanie Neef | Great Britain | 11.79 | Q |
| 13 | 1 | Chantal Brunner | New Zealand | 11.89 | Q |
| 14 | 1 | Cristina Martín | Spain | 11.99 | Q |
| 15 | 1 | Begoña Yúdice | Spain | 12.09 | q |
| 16 | 2 | Aïda Diop | Senegal | 12.13 | Q |
| 17 | 2 | Louisette Thobi | Cameroon | 12.44 | |
| 18 | 1 | Kuan Yuh-hsiu | Chinese Taipei | 12.59 | |
| 19 | 2 | Fan Yuk | Hong Kong | 12.96 | |
| | ? | Marina Bonello | Malta | ? | |
| | ? | May Sardouk | Lebanon | ? | |
| | ? | Farhad Jasmin Liti | Bangladesh | ? | |
| | ? | Jacqueline Solíz | Bolivia | ? | |

=== Semifinals ===
Wind:
Heat 1: +0.5 m/s, Heat 2: +1.6 m/s

| Rank | Heat | Athlete | Nationality | Time | Notes |
|---|---|---|---|---|---|
| 1 | 1 | Chryste Gaines | United States | 11.48 | Q |
| 1 | 2 | Anita Howard | United States | 11.48 | Q |
| 3 | 2 | Wang Huei-chen | Chinese Taipei | 11.54 | Q |
| 4 | 2 | Laurentia Hurmuz | Romania | 11.65 | Q |
| 5 | 2 | Laura Ardissone | Italy | 11.68 | Q |
| 6 | 1 | Idalmis Bonne | Cuba | 11.69 | Q |
| 6 | 2 | Melissa Moore | Australia | 11.69 | |
| 8 | 1 | Sølvi Olsen | Norway | 11.72 | Q |
| 9 | 1 | Christine Bloomfield | Great Britain | 11.79 | Q |
| 10 | 2 | Melanie Neef | Great Britain | 11.88 | |
| 11 | 1 | Mary Tombiri | Nigeria | 11.89 | |
| 11 | 1 | Annarita Balzani | Italy | 11.89 | |
| 13 | 1 | Chantal Brunner | New Zealand | 11.91 | |
| 14 | 2 | Cristina Martín | Spain | 12.02 | |
| 15 | 2 | Aïda Diop | Senegal | 12.18 | |
| 16 | 1 | Begoña Yúdice | Spain | 12.24 | |

=== Final ===
Wind: +1.6 m/s

| Rank | Athlete | Nationality | Time | Notes |
|---|---|---|---|---|
| 1st place, gold medalist(s) | Chryste Gaines | United States | 11.27 | |
| 2nd place, silver medalist(s) | Anita Howard | United States | 11.45 | |
| 3rd place, bronze medalist(s) | Sølvi Olsen | Norway | 11.61 | |
| 4 | Wang Huei-chen | Chinese Taipei | 11.67 | |
| 5 | Laurentia Hurmuz | Romania | 11.68 | |
| 6 | Idalmis Bonne | Cuba | 11.70 | |
| 7 | Christine Bloomfield | Great Britain | 11.72 | |
| 8 | Laura Ardissone | Italy | 11.79 | |
