= Namibia at the 2007 All-Africa Games =

- IOC code: NAM
- NOC: Namibian National Olympic Committee

in Algiers 11 July 2007 – 23 July 2007
- Medals Ranked 29th: Gold 0 Silver 1 Bronze 2 Total 3

All-Africa Games appearances
- 1991; 1995; 1999; 2003; 2007; 2011; 2015; 2019; 2023

Namibia competed in the 2007 All-Africa Games held at the Stade du 5 Juillet in the city of Algiers, Algeria. It was the fifth time that the country had sent a team to the Games since gaining independence and they left with three medals, one of the lowest counts to date. Two medals were won by Agnes Samaria in athletics. Herunga Jipekapora also broke the national record in 400 metres during the heats.

== Competitors ==
Namibia entered a wide range of athletics competitions, including 100 metres, 200 metres, 400 metres, 800 metres, 1500 metres, half marathon, high jump, long jump and triple jump. During the 400 metre heats, Herunga Jipekapora ran a new national record of 52.46. The country also competed in other events, including boxing, where Immanuel Naidjala, Japhet Uutoni and Johannes Simon all made it to the quarter-finals.

== Medal summary ==
Namibia won only three medals, joint lowest in the history of the country's participation in the Games.

=== Medal table ===
Sport	Gold	Silver	Bronze	Total
Athletics	0	1	1	2
Boxing	0	0	1	1
Total	0	1	2	3

== List of Medalists ==
=== Silver Medal ===
Medal	Name	Sport	Event	Date	Ref
Silver	Agnes Samaria	Athletics	Women's 800 metres	19 July	

=== Bronze Medal ===
Medal	Name	Sport	Event	Date	Ref
Bronze	Agnes Samaria	Athletics	Women's 1500 metres	20 July	
Bronze	Johannes Simon	Boxing	Men's Flyweight (51 kilograms)	17 July	

== See also ==
- Namibia at the African Games
