= Athletics at the 1992 Summer Olympics – Men's marathon =

Men's marathon at the Games of the XXV Olympiad
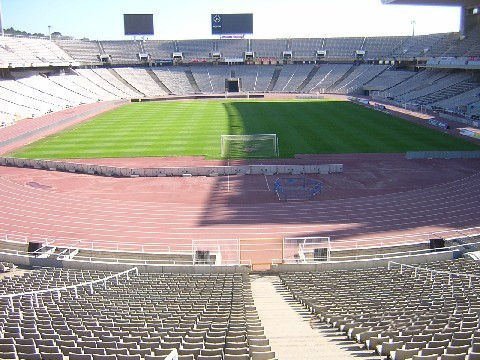
- Estadio Olimpico de Montjuic (2007)
- Venue: Estadi Olímpic Lluís Companys, Barcelona
- Date: August 9
- Competitors: 110 from 72 nations
- Winning time: 2:13:23

Medalists
1st place, gold medalist(s)		Hwang Young-Cho; South Korea
2nd place, silver medalist(s)		Koichi Morishita; Japan
3rd place, bronze medalist(s)		Stephan Freigang; Germany

Official Video Highlights

The men's marathon at the 1992 Summer Olympics in Barcelona, Spain, was held on Sunday August 9, 1992. The race started at 18:30h local time. One hundred and ten athletes from 72 nations started; 87 athletes completed the race, with Pyambuugiin Tuul from Mongolia finishing in last position in 4:00:44 (the first Olympic marathon runner to finish over 4 hours since 1908). The maximum number of athletes per nation had been set at 3 since the 1930 Olympic Congress. The event was won by Hwang Young-Cho of South Korea, the nation's first Olympic men's marathon medal. Koichi Morishita's silver was Japan's first medal in the event since 1968. Stephan Freigang of Germany took bronze, the first medal for Germany in the event though East Germany had won two golds (both by Waldemar Cierpinski) during partition.

== Background ==
This was the 22nd appearance of the event, which is one of 12 athletics events to have been held at every Summer Olympics. Returning runners from the 1988 marathon included seven of the top eight finishers: gold medalist Gelindo Bordin of Italy, silver medalist Douglas Wakiihuri of Kenya, bronze medalist Hussein Ahmed Salah of Djibouti, fourth-place finisher Takeyuki Nakayama of Japan, fifth-place finisher Steve Moneghetti and eighth-place finisher Robert de Castella of Australia, and seventh-place finisher Juma Ikangaa of Tanzania. The world record holder, Belayneh Dinsamo of Ethiopia, did not enter; the 1991 World champion, Hiromi Taniguchi of Japan, did. The field was "very wide open as nobody had dominated the event in the preceding years."

Aruba, Bahrain, Cameroon, Liechtenstein, Mauritania, Mongolia, Namibia, San Marino, Slovenia, and Syria each made their first appearance in Olympic men's marathons; some former Soviet republics appeared as the Unified Team in the team's only Summer Games. The United States made its 21st appearance, most of any nation, having missed only the boycotted 1980 Games.

== Competition format and course ==
As all Olympic marathons, the competition was a single race. The marathon distance of 26 miles, 385 yards was run over a point-to-point route starting at Mataró and finishing at the Olympic Stadium. The course ran along the Catalan coast, finishing with a "brutal" climb of 150 metres up Montjuïc to the stadium. Because of the timing of the race so close to the closing ceremony, an alternate finish line outside the stadium was used for runners finishing in over 2 hours and 45 minutes.

== Records ==
These were the standing world and Olympic records prior to the 1992 Summer Olympics.

World record	Belayneh Dinsamo (ETH)	2:06:50	Rotterdam, Netherlands	17 April 1988
Olympic record	Carlos Lopes (POR)	2:09:21	Los Angeles, United States	12 August July 1984

No new world or Olympic bests were set during the competition.

== Schedule ==
It was a hot day, 27 °C (81 °F), somewhat mitigated by the late start at 6:30 p.m. The schedule put the top finishers in the stadium just before the closing ceremony started, but slower runners could not finish in the stadium due to the ceremony.

All times are Central European Summer Time (UTC+2)

Date	Time	Round
Sunday, 9 August 1992	18:30	Final

== Results ==
Rank	Athlete	Nation	Time
1st place, gold medalist(s)	Hwang Young-Cho	South Korea	2:13:23
2nd place, silver medalist(s)	Kōichi Morishita	Japan	2:13:45
3rd place, bronze medalist(s)	Stephan Freigang	Germany	2:14:00
4	Takeyuki Nakayama	Japan	2:14:02
5	Salvatore Bettiol	Italy	2:14:15
6	Salah Kokaich	Morocco	2:14:25
7	Jan Huruk	Poland	2:14:32
8	Hiromi Taniguchi	Japan	2:14:42
9	Diego García	Spain	2:14:56
10	Kim Jae-Ryong	South Korea	2:15:01
11	Harri Hänninen	Finland	2:15:19
12	Steve Spence	United States	2:15:21
13	Ed Eyestone	United States	2:15:23
14	Boniface Merande	Kenya	2:15:46
15	Bert van Vlaanderen	Netherlands	2:15:47
16	Rex Wilson	New Zealand	2:15:51
17	Bob Kempainen	United States	2:15:53
18	Rodrigo Gavela	Spain	2:16:23
19	Karel David	Czechoslovakia	2:16:34
20	Leszek Beblo	Poland	2:16:38
21	Wiesław Perszke	Poland	2:16:38
22	Yakov Tolstikov	Unified Team	2:17:04
23	Tena Negere	Ethiopia	2:17:07
24	Osmiro Silva	Brazil	2:17:16
25	Abel Mokibe	South Africa	2:17:24
26	Robert de Castella	Australia	2:17:44
27	Steve Brace	Great Britain	2:17:49
28	Kim Wan-gi	South Korea	2:18:32
29	Isidro Rico	Mexico	2:18:52
30	Hussein Ahmed Salah	Djibouti	2:19:04
31	Dominique Chauvelier	France	2:19:09
32	José Montiel	Spain	2:19:15
33	Thabiso Moqhali	Lesotho	2:19:28
34	Juma Ikangaa	Tanzania	2:19:34
35	Derek Froude	New Zealand	2:19:37
36	Douglas Wakiihuri	Kenya	2:19:38
37	Ibrahim Hussein	Kenya	2:19:49
38	Gyula Borka	Hungary	2:20:46
39	Dave Long	Great Britain	2:20:51
40	Mirko Vindiš	Slovenia	2:21:03
41	Paul Davies-Hale	Great Britain	2:21:15
42	Elphas Ginindza	Swaziland	2:21:15
43	Rolando Vera	Ecuador	2:21:30
44	Alessio Faustini	Italy	2:21:37
45	Luis Soares	France	2:21:57
46	Paul Kuété	Cameroon	2:22:43
47	Helmut Schmuck	Austria	2:23:38
48	Steve Moneghetti	Australia	2:23:42
49	Konrad Dobler	Germany	2:23:44
50	Ralombo Mwenze	Zaire	2:23:47
51	John Treacy	Ireland	2:24:11
52	Herman Suizo	Philippines	2:25:18
53	Peter Reynierse	Aruba	2:25:31
54	Nelson Zamora	Uruguay	2:25:32
55	Daniel Böltz	Switzerland	2:25:50
56	Joseildo da Silva	Brazil	2:26:00
57	Juan Camacho	Bolivia	2:26:01
58	Cephas Matafi	Zimbabwe	2:26:17
59	Mohamed Selmi	Algeria	2:26:56
60	Ildephonse Sehirwa	Rwanda	2:27:44
61	Zerehune Gizaw	Ethiopia	2:28:25
62	Jaime Ojeda	Chile	2:28:39
63	Smartex Tambala	Malawi	2:29:02
64	Pascal Zilliox	France	2:30:02
65	Luis López	Costa Rica	2:30:26
66	Gian Luigi Macina	San Marino	2:30:45
67	Abdou Manzo	Niger	2:31:15
68	Roland Willie	Liechtenstein	2:31:32
69	Frank Kayele	Namibia	2:31:41
70	Hari Bahadur Rokaya	Nepal	2:32:26
71	Kuruppu Karunaratne	Sri Lanka	2:32:26
72	Tommy Hughes	Ireland	2:32:55
73	William Aguirre	Nicaragua	2:34:18
74	Ferdinand Amadi	Central African Republic	2:35:39
75	Mohamed Khamis Taher	Libya	2:35:46
76	Dieudonné LaMothe	Haiti	2:36:11
77	Myint Kan	Myanmar	2:37:39
78	Calvin Dallas	Virgin Islands	2:38:11
79	Saad Mubarak Ali	Bahrain	2:39:19
80	Ryu Ok-hyon	North Korea	2:40:51
81	Alain Razahasoa	Madagascar	2:41:41
82	Michael Lopeyok	Uganda	2:42:54
83	Benjamin Keleketu	Botswana	2:45:57
84	Moussa El-Hariri	Syria	2:47:06
85	Lưu Văn Hùng	Vietnam	2:56:42
86	Hussein Haleem	Maldives	3:04:16
87	Pyambuugiin Tuul	Mongolia	4:00:44
—	Apolinario Belisle	Honduras	DNF
—	Abebe Mekonnen	Ethiopia	DNF
—	Bineshwar Prasad	Fiji	DNF
—	Peter Maher	Canada	DNF
—	Diamantino dos Santos	Brazil	DNF
—	Luketz Swartbooi	Namibia	DNF
—	John Burra	Tanzania	DNF
—	Dionicio Cerón	Mexico	DNF
—	Jorge González	Puerto Rico	DNF
—	António Pinto Coelho	Portugal	DNF
—	Gelindo Bordin	Italy	DNF
—	Carlos Grisales	Colombia	DNF
—	Alberto Cuba	Cuba	DNF
—	Talal Omar Abdillahi	Djibouti	DNF
—	Csaba Szűcs	Hungary	DNF
—	Andy Ronan	Ireland	DNF
—	Mohamed Ould Khalifa	Mauritania	DNF
—	Tonnie Dirks	Netherlands	DNF
—	Dionísio Castro	Portugal	DNF
—	Joaquim Pinheiro	Portugal	DNF
—	Jan Tau	South Africa	DNF
—	Zithulele Sinqe	South Africa	DNF
—	Simon Robert Naali	Tanzania	DNF
—	Vladimir Bukhanov	Unified Team	DNS
—	Salvador García	Mexico	DNS

== See also ==
- 1990 Men's European Championships Marathon (Split)
- 1991 Men's World Championships Marathon (Tokyo)
- 1992 Marathon Year Ranking
- 1993 Men's World Championships Marathon (Stuttgart)
