= Namibia at the 2023 African Games =

- Flag of Namibia
- IOC code: NAM
- NOC: Namibia National Olympic Committee

in Accra, Ghana 8 March 2024 – 23 March 2024
- Competitors: 80 in 7 sports
- Medals Ranked 23rd: Gold 1 Silver 4 Bronze 5 Total 10

African Games appearances (overview)
- 1991; 1995; 1999; 2003; 2007; 2011; 2015; 2019; 2023

Namibia competed at the 2023 African Games held from 8 to 23 March 2024 in Accra, Ghana. Namibia competed in 7 sports.

== Medal table ==
| Medal | Name | Sport | Event | Date |
|---|---|---|---|---|
| Gold | Ronan Wantenaar | Swimming | Men's 100 metre breaststroke | 10 March |
| Silver | Xander Skinner | Swimming | Men's 100 metre freestyle | 9 March |
| Silver | Ronan Wantenaar | Swimming | Men's 200 metre breaststroke | 11 March |
| Silver | Anri Krugel | Cycling | Women's elites | 12 March |
| Silver | Namibia | Cricket | Men's tournament | 23 March |
| Bronze | Jessica Humphrey | Swimming | Women's 200 metre backstroke | 10 March |
| Bronze | Abraham Ester | Wrestling | Women's freestyle 57 kg | 10 March |
| Bronze | Xander Skinner | Swimming | Men's 50 metre freestyle | 13 March |
| Bronze | Ryan Williams | Athletics | Men's discus throw | 18 March |
| Bronze | Gilbert Hainuca | Athletics | Men's 100 metres | 19 March |

== Cricket ==
=== Men's ===
Group play

| Pos | Team | Pld | W | L | T | NR | Pts | NRR | Qualification |
|---|---|---|---|---|---|---|---|---|---|
| 1 | Zimbabwe Emerging | 3 | 3 | 0 | 0 | 0 | 6 | 1.600 | Advanced to knockout stage |
| 2 | Namibia | 3 | 1 | 2 | 0 | 0 | 2 | 0.195 | Advanced to knockout stage |
| 3 | Tanzania | 3 | 1 | 2 | 0 | 0 | 2 | −0.220 | |
| 4 | Nigeria | 3 | 1 | 2 | 0 | 0 | 2 | −1.158 | |

Source: ESPNcricinfo

17 March 2024
09:30
Scorecard

| Zimbabwe Emerging; 197/6 (20 overs) | v | Namibia; 162/8 (20 overs) |
| Brian Bennett 65 (39); Jan Nicol Loftie-Eaton 2/27 (4 overs) | | Malan Kruger 46 (23); Tashinga Musekiwa 3/29 (4 overs) |

Zimbabwe Emerging won by 35 runs
Achimota Oval A, Accra
Umpires: Stacy Lackay (SA) and Isaac Oyieko (Ken)
Player of the match: Owen Muzondo (Zim)

- Zimbabwe Emerging won the toss and elected to bat.

18 March 2024
09:30
Scorecard

| Namibia; 121/7 (20 overs) | v | Nigeria; 126/7 (20 overs) |
| Dylan Leicher 42* (41); Isaac Danladi 2/10 (4 overs) | | Isaac Danladi 28 (21); Jan Nicol Loftie-Eaton 3/20 (4 overs) |

Nigeria won by 3 wickets
Achimota Oval B, Accra
Umpires: Iknow Chabi (Zim) and Patric Makumbi (Uga)
Player of the match: Isaac Danladi (Nga)

- Namibia won the toss and elected to bat.
- Jan Balt, Simon Shikongo and Gerhard Janse van Rensburg (Nam) all made their T20I debuts.

20 March 2024
13:50
Scorecard

| Tanzania; 71/9 (20 overs) | v | Namibia; 72/3 (12.3 overs) |
| SanjayKumar Thakor 15 (28); Ben Shikongo 2/9 (4 overs) | | JP Kotze 21* (22); Ally Kimote 2/20 (3.3 overs) |

Namibia won by 7 wickets
Achimota Oval B, Accra
Umpires: Iknow Chabi (Zim) and Percival Sizara (Zim)
Player of the match: Ben Shikongo (Nam)

- Tanzania won the toss and elected to bat.

=== Women's ===
Group play

| Pos | Team | Pld | W | L | T | NR | Pts | NRR | Qualification |
|---|---|---|---|---|---|---|---|---|---|
| 1 | South Africa Emerging | 3 | 2 | 1 | 0 | 0 | 4 | 1.887 | Advanced to the knockout stage |
| 2 | Nigeria | 3 | 1 | 1 | 0 | 1 | 3 | 0.778 | Advanced to the knockout stage |
| 3 | Tanzania | 3 | 1 | 1 | 0 | 1 | 3 | −1.130 | |
| 4 | Namibia | 3 | 1 | 2 | 0 | 0 | 2 | −1.421 | |

Source: ESPNcricinfo

7 March 2024
09:00
Scorecard

| Namibia; 89/7 (20 overs) | v | South Africa Emerging; 29/4 (6 overs) |
| Wilka Mwatile 37 (41); Jemma Botha 2/9 (2 overs) | | Miane Smit 12* (11); Kayleen Green 3/6 (2 overs) |

Namibia won by 1 run (DLS method)
Achimota Oval A, Accra
Umpires: Iknow Chabi (Zim) and Adil Kassam (Tan)
Player of the match: Kayleen Green (Nam)

- South Africa Emerging won the toss and elected to field.
- No further play was possible due to rain.

8 March 2024
09:30
Scorecard

| Nigeria; 111/6 (20 overs) | v | Namibia; 56 (18.4 overs) |
| Salome Sunday 40 (36); Kayleen Green 2/19 (4 overs) | | Yasmeen Khan 17 (19); Usen Peace 3/5 (4 overs) |

Nigeria won by 55 runs
Achimota Oval B, Accra
Umpires: Sarah Dambanevana (Zim) and Stacy Lackay (SA)
Player of the match: Usen Peace (Nga)

- Nigeria won the toss and elected to bat.

10 March 2024
09:00
Scorecard

| Namibia; 103 (20 overs) | v | Tanzania; 107/9 (18.4 overs) |
| Yasmeen Khan 48 (45); Agnes Qwele 3/19 (3 overs) | | Saum Mtae 41 (30); Jurriene Diergaardt 2/6 (2 overs) |

Tanzania won by 1 wicket
Achimota Oval A, Accra
Umpires: Sarah Dambanevana (Zim) and Stacy Lackay (SA)
Player of the match: Saum Mtae (Tan)

- Namibia won the toss and elected to bat.
