= Frank Kayele =

Namibian long-distance runner

Personal information
- Full name: Tuihaleni Frank Kayele
- Nationality: Namibian
- Born: 12 February 1964 (age 62)

Sport
- Sport: Athletics

Tuihaleni Frank Kayele (born 12 February 1964) is a Namibian former long-distance runner. Growing up, he and his cousin would run and carry foodstuffs from a farm to Frank's hometown. Later on, he competed at the 1992 Summer Olympics as one of the first Namibian athletes to compete for the nation at an Olympic Games. He competed in the men's marathon and placed 69th.

== Biography ==
Tuihaleni Frank Kayele was born on 12 February 1964. His mother is Suama Kayele. Alongside his cousin and national team duathlete Thomas Kayele, they ran for 64 kilometres (40 miles) during school holidays from Thomas' mother's farm in Gaub until Tsumeb, Frank's hometown. They carried bags filled with cornmeal stuffed with dry meat and a container that held 10 litres (2.6 US gallons) of milk from the farm.

Kayele competed at the 1992 Summer Olympics in Barcelona, Spain, representing Namibia in men's athletics. He became one of the first Namibian athletics competitors and one of the first Namibian sportspeople overall to compete at an Olympic Games, as the nation made its official debut at the Olympic Games at this edition of the competition.

At the 1992 Summer Games, he competed in the men's marathon on 9 August 1992 against 109 other competitors, alongside compatriot Luketz Swartbooi. Kayele finished the race and place 69th out of the 87 athletes that completed the entire course, recording a time of 2:31:41. In the same year, he set a personal best in the same event with a time of 2:11:59 set at the Swakopmund Marathon in Swakopmund.
