= Athletics at the 2011 All-Africa Games – Women's half marathon =

The women's half marathon event at the 2011 All-Africa Games was held on 15 September.

== Results ==
Rank	Name	Nationality	Time	Notes
1st place, gold medalist(s)	Mare Dibaba	Ethiopia	1:10:47	
2nd place, silver medalist(s)	Mamitu Daska	Ethiopia	1:10:52	
3rd place, bronze medalist(s)	Helalia Johannes	Namibia	1:11:12	
4	Peninah Arusei	Kenya	1:11:35	
5	Sarah Chepchirchir	Kenya	1:12:39	
6	Merima Mohammad Hasen	Ethiopia	1:15:06	
7	Rutendo Nyahora	Zimbabwe	1:19:35	
8	Malcampong Masaile	Lesotho	1:27:25	
9	Hortencia Lichimane	Mozambique	1:29:00	
