= Athletics at the 1991 Summer Universiade – Men's marathon =

The men's marathon event at the 1991 Summer Universiade was held at the streets of Sheffield on 21 July 1991.

== Results ==
Rank	Athlete	NUSF	Time	Notes
1st place, gold medalist(s)	Hwang Young-cho	South Korea	2:12:40	
2nd place, silver medalist(s)	Kenjiro Jitsui	Japan	2:14:22	
3rd place, bronze medalist(s)	Choi Hyong Chol	North Korea	2:17:45	
4	Gazi Aşıkoğlu	Turkey	2:18:00	
5	Ricardo Castaño	Spain	2:18:16	
6	Yuichi Chiba	Japan	2:19:43	
7	Sergio Jiménez	Mexico	2:21:43	
8	Kim Gi Chol	North Korea	2:22:14	
9	Vladimir Fomin	Soviet Union	2:22:30	
10	Hsu Gi-sheng	Chinese Taipei	2:23:60	
11	Konstantin Permitin	Soviet Union	2:24:46	
12	Jon Hume	United States	2:26:55	
13	Kennedy Manyisa	Kenya	2:27:01	
14	Minoru Kishimoto	Japan	2:27:15	
15	Giacomo Leone	Italy	2:27:31	
16	Robert Stolz	United States	2:29:43	
17	Asen Khristov	Bulgaria	2:33:19	
18	Frans Barry	Lesotho	2:33:42	
19	Dilip Karki Kumar	Nepal	2:40:55	
20	Kithinji Maragara	Kenya	2:49:06	
21	John Laisse	Mozambique	3:13:03	
22	Julio Fagena	Mozambique	3:13:03	
23	Godknows Tefe	Ghana	3:17:37	
23	Rodrigo Gavela	Spain	3:17:37	
23	S. Watson	Great Britain	3:17:37	
23	Y. Lekahena	Indonesia	3:17:37	
