= Paulus Ali Nuumbembe =

Namibian boxer (born 1978)

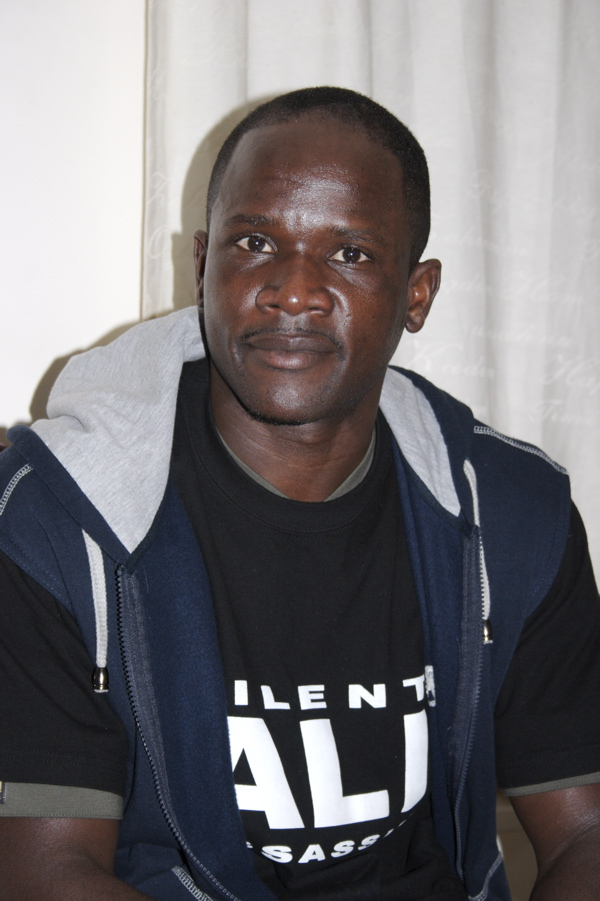

Personal information
- Nickname: The Silent Assassin
- Nationality: Namibian
- Born: Paulus Ali Nuumbembe; June 24, 1978 (age 48) Oshakati, Namibia
- Height: 5 ft 7 in (1.70 m)
- Weight: Welterweight

Boxing career
- Stance: Orthodox

Boxing record
- Total fights: 24
- Wins: 20
- Win by KO: 7
- Losses: 3
- Draws: 1
Medal record
Men's Boxing
Representing Namibia
Commonwealth Games
Bronze medal – third place	2002 Manchester	Welterweight

Paulus Ali Nuumbembe (born 24 June 1978 in Oshakati, Oshana Region, Namibia) is a Namibian welterweight boxer. Nicknamed "The Silent Assassin", Nuumbembe is a former Commonwealth champion who represented Namibia at the 2000 Summer Olympics and the 2002 Commonwealth Games.

== Rise to Prominence ==
Nuumbembe came to prominence in April 2005, when he fought to a points draw with undefeated British Champion David Barnes in a challenge for the vacant WBO Inter-Continental welterweight title.

== Commonwealth title ==
The biggest moment of his career came when he earned a points victory over Scotland's unbeaten Kevin Anderson to win the Commonwealth Welterweight title. He was the first Commonwealth Champion from Namibia.

== Return to Namibia ==
Nuumbembe lost the title due to a cut, against Craig Watson on December 8, 2007. In 2008, after spending much of his boxing life in Britain, Nuumbembe made the decision to move back to Namibia. He has since gone on to win the WBA Pan African welterweight title and Namibian Title.

Nuumembe is now a Major in the Namibian Defence Force and is currently training their boxers.

Olympic Games
Preceded by Friedhelm Sack	Flagbearer for Namibia; Sydney 2000	Succeeded by Paulus Ambunda
