= Namibia at the African Games =

- IOC code: NAM
- NOC: Namibian Sports Commission
- Medals: Gold 7 Silver 15 Bronze 29 Total 51

African Games appearances (overview)
- 1991; 1995; 1999; 2003; 2007; 2011; 2015; 2019; 2023; 2027

Namibia (NAM) has competed in the last eight African Games, first appearing in 1991. Athletes from Namibia have won a total of fifty-one medals, including seven gold.

== Participation ==
Namibia gained independence on 1 February 1990 with the introduction of majority rule and end of apartheid. The country attended the next Games in 1991, participating disabled and able-bodied athletes sharing the medals equally. The country's involvement in the African Games is the responsibility of the Namibian Sports Commission which provides funding for participation in the events.

== Medal tables ==
=== Medals by Games ===
Below is a table representing all Namibian medals won at the Games.

Games	Athletes	Gold	Silver	Bronze	Total	Rank
1991 Cairo		4	2	6	12	9
1995 Harare		0	4	3	7	19
1999 Johannesburg		0	0	2	2	30
2003 Abuja		0	3	4	7	22
2007 Algiers		0	1	2	3	31
2011 Maputo		1	1	5	7	22
2015 Brazzaville		0	2	3	5	12
2019 Rabat		2	2	4	8	16
Total		7	15	29	51	22

== See also ==
- Namibia at the Olympics
- Namibia at the Paralympics
- Sport in Namibia
