= Mohamed Khamis Taher =

Libyan long-distance runner (born 1959)

Personal information
- Nationality: Libyan
- Born: 30 December 1959 (age 66)

Sport
- Sport: Long-distance running
- Event: Marathon

Mohamed Khamis Taher (born 30 December 1959) is a Libyan long-distance runner. He competed in the men's marathon at the 1992 Summer Olympics.
