= Laura Ardissone =

Italian sprinter (born 1969)

Personal information
- Nationality: Italian
- Born: 7 February 1969 (age 57)

Sport
- Country: Italy
- Sport: Athletics
- Event: Sprinting

Achievements and titles
- Personal best: +100 m: 11.48 (1994)
Medal record
Mediterranean Games
Silver medal – second place	1993 Narbonne	4x100 m relay

Laura Ardissone (born 7 February 1969) is an Italian retired sprinter, which participated at the 1995 World Championships in Athletics.

== Achievements ==
Year	Competition	Venue	Position	Event	Time	Notes
1991	Summer Universiade	(United Kingdom) Sheffield	8th	100 metres	11.79	
1994	European Championships	(Finland) Helsinki	Semi	4x100 metres relay	44.46	
1995	World Championships	(Sweden) Gothenburg	Heat	4x100 metres relay	NM	
