= Ildephonse Sehirwa =

Rwandan long-distance runner

Personal information
- Nationality: Rwandan

Sport
- Sport: Long-distance running
- Event: Marathon

Ildephonse Sehirwa is a Rwandan long-distance runner. He competed in the men's marathon at the 1992 Summer Olympics.
