= Gharde Geldenhuys =

Namibian gymnast

Personal information
- Nationality: Namibian
- Born: September 15, 1981 (age 44) Swakopmund, South-West Africa

Sport
- Country: Namibia
- Sport: Artistic gymnastics
- College team: Washington Huskies

Gharde Geldenhuys (born 15 September 1981) is a Namibian female artistic gymnast. She appeared at the 1998 Commonwealth Games, 1997 World Championship finishing 108th in the All Around, and the 1999 World Championships. She competed at the 2000 Summer Olympics representing Namibia through wild card entry in the artistic gymnastics event.
