= Hwang Young-cho =

South Korean long-distance runner

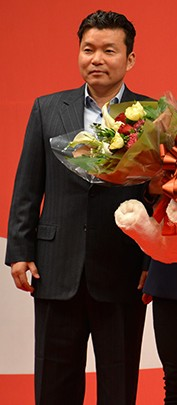

Personal information
- Born: 22 March 1970 (age 56) Samcheok, Gangwon Province, South Korea
Medal record
Men's athletics
Representing South Korea
Olympic Games
Gold medal – first place	1992 Barcelona	Marathon
Asian Games
Gold medal – first place	1994 Hiroshima	Marathon
Asian Championships
Gold medal – first place	1991 Kuala Lumpur	10,000 m
Universiade
Gold medal – first place	1991 Sheffield	Marathon

- Hwang Young-cho
- Hangul: 황영조
- Hanja: 黃永祚
- RR: Hwang Yeongjo
- MR: Hwang Yŏngjo
- IPA: [ɸwaŋ jʌŋdʑo]

Hwang Young-cho (Korean: 황영조; born 22 March 1970) is a former South Korean athlete, winner of the marathon race at the 1992 Summer Olympics and 1994 Asian Games.

== Career ==
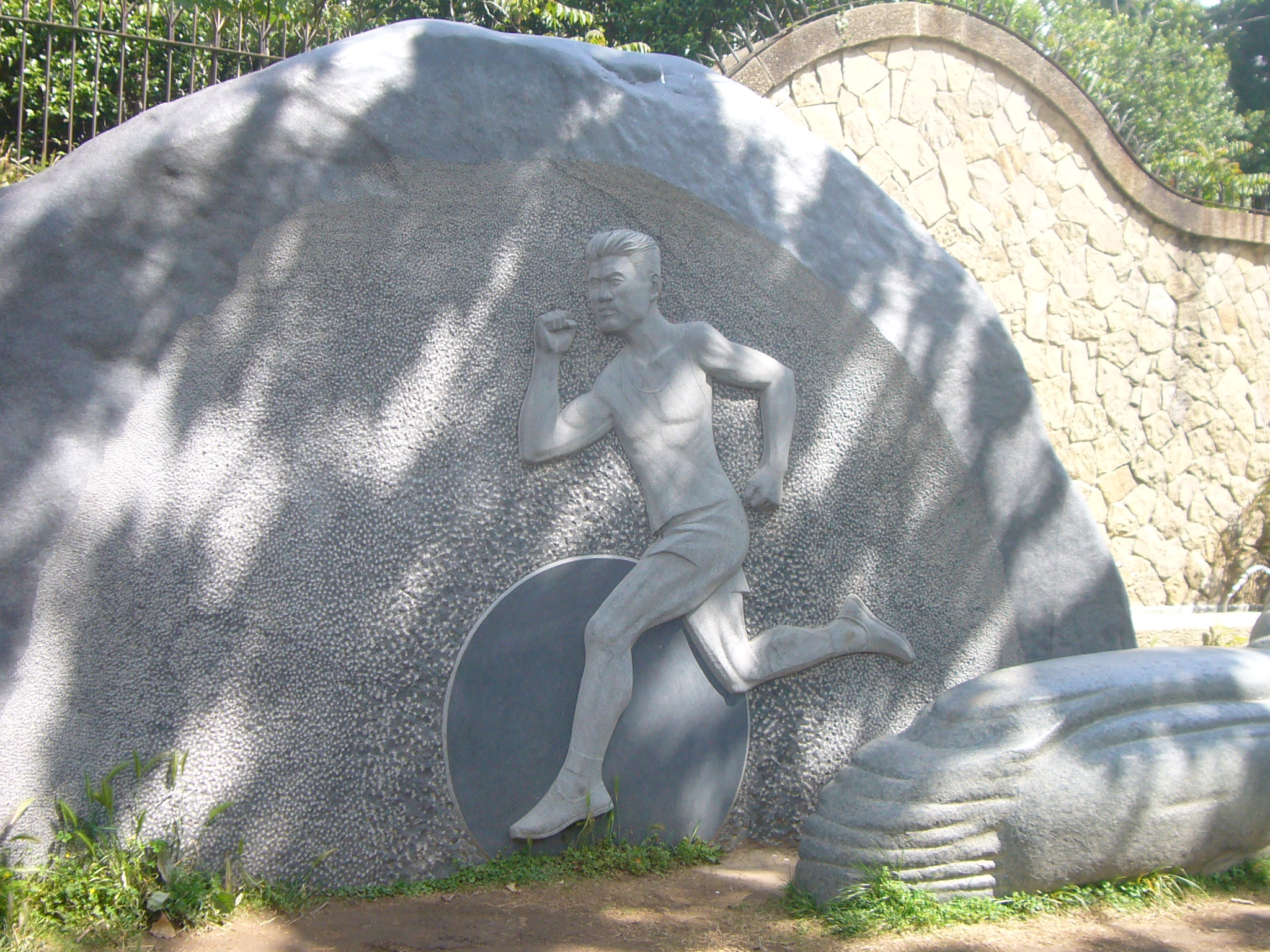
Monument to Hwang Young-cho located in front of the Barcelona Olympic Stadium, installed in 2001

Born in Samcheok, South Korea, Hwang was a promising track athlete in his junior years, but after his first marathon in 1991, which he won, he decided to specialize in marathon.

The Barcelona Olympic marathon was only the fourth of his career. In three previous marathons he had won two and placed second in the other.

Historical records show a challenging climate for the Barcelona race, with ambient temperatures at 29 degrees Celsius (84.2 deg. Fahrenheit) and a clear sky without cloud cover at the event’s start time of 18:30 increasing the risk of heat stress for the participants. The course also had a brutal finish, with a rise of 150 meters, the equivalent of 50 Stories in a highrise building, to Montjuic after 42 km (26.2 miles) of running.

Despite these grueling conditions, Hwang led the pack of 110 athletes from the start, and was at the head of thirty runners at the halfway mark. In the second half of the race, these difficult conditions saw many athletes fall off pace, until at 35 km, only Hwang and Kōichi Morishita from Japan remained. After a memorable struggle, Hwang broke away at the 40 km mark to win the gold medal. His winning time of 2:13:23 reflected the oppressive conditions that he and the other participants had to overcome.

Hwang raced sparingly after Barcelona, and he retired after injury prevented him from representing South Korea in the 1996 Olympics.

Hwang was honoured for his performance and resilience in Barcelona by being depicted on the 2006 Berlin Marathon medal to commemorate his victory in the 1992 Olympic marathon event.

== South Koreans' Olympic marathon medals ==
Hwang is one of two Koreans to have won the Olympic marathon. The other winner was Sohn Kee-chung. Hwang's contemporary, Lee Bong-Ju won the silver medal in the marathon at the 1996 Summer Olympics held in Atlanta, and Nam Sung-yong won the bronze medal at the 1936 Summer Olympics in Berlin at the same race that Sohn Kee-chung won.

== Achievements ==
- 1991
  - Summer Universiade, winner of the men's marathon in Sheffield.
- 1992
  - Summer Olympics, winner of the men's marathon in Barcelona.
- 1994
  - Asian Games, winner of the men's marathon in Hiroshima.
  - Boston Marathon, fourth place in a new Korean record (2:08:09)

== See also ==
- Sohn Kee-Chung
- Lee Bong-ju
