= Saad Mubarak Ali =

Bahraini long-distance runner

Personal information
- Nationality: Bahraini
- Born: 18 September 1960 (age 65)

Sport
- Sport: Long-distance running
- Event: Marathon

Saad Mubarak Ali (born 18 September 1960) is a Bahraini long-distance runner. He competed in the men's marathon at the 1992 Summer Olympics.
