= Michael Lopeyok =

Ugandan long-distance runner

Personal information
- Nationality: Ugandan
- Born: 16 February 1962 (age 64)

Sport
- Sport: Long-distance running
- Event: Marathon

Michael Lopeyok (born 16 February 1962) is a Ugandan long-distance runner. He competed in the men's marathon at the 1992 Summer Olympics.
