= Jaime Ojeda =

Chilean long-distance runner

Personal information
- Nationality: Chilean
- Born: 3 August 1963 (age 62)

Sport
- Sport: Long-distance running
- Event: Marathon

Jaime Ojeda (born 3 August 1963) is a Chilean long-distance runner. He competed in the men's marathon at the 1992 Summer Olympics.
