= Pascal Zilliox =

French long-distance runner 1962–2000

Personal information
- Nationality: French
- Born: 19 June 1962 Créhange, Moselle, France
- Died: 5 August 2000 (aged 38) Art-sur-Meurthe, Meurthe-et-Moselle, France

Sport
- Sport: Long-distance running
- Event: Marathon

Pascal Zilliox (19 June 1962 – 5 August 2000) was a French long-distance runner. He competed in the men's marathon at the 1992 Summer Olympics.
