= Myint Kan =

Burmese long-distance runner

Personal information
- Nationality: Burmese
- Born: 13 September 1965 (age 60)

Sport
- Sport: Long-distance running
- Event: Marathon

Myint Kan (born 13 September 1965) is a Burmese long-distance runner. He competed in the marathon at the 1992 Summer Olympics.
