= Paul Kuété =

Cameroonian long-distance runner

Personal information
- Nationality: Cameroonian
- Born: 20 December 1972 (age 53)

Sport
- Sport: Long-distance running
- Event: Marathon

Paul Kuété (born 20 December 1972) is a Cameroonian long-distance runner. He competed in the men's marathon at the 1992 Summer Olympics.
