= Mannie Heymans =

Namibian cyclist (born 1971)

Personal information
- Full name: Johannes Frederick Heymans
- Born: 15 July 1971 (age 55) Krugersdorp, South Africa

Cycling career
- Sport: Cycling
- Role: Rider

Professional teams
- 1991-2003: Namibian African Games Cycling Team
- 1994-2006: Namibian Commonwealth Games Cycling Team
- 2000-2008: Namibian Olympic Cycling Team

Johannes Frederick “Mannie” Heymans (born 15 July 1971) is a Namibian cyclist. He was born in Krugersdorp, South Africa.

== Personal ==
Heymans moved to Namibia in 1984 while the country was still occupied by his native South Africa. A rugby player until then, Heymans began cycling in 1987.

== International ==
Heymans has represented Namibia numerous times, including at the 1991, 1995, 1999 and 2003 All-Africa Games. He also competed for his country at the 1994, 1998, 2002 and 2006 Commonwealth Games. As for the Summer Olympics, Heymans has participated in the 2000, 2004 and 2008 Summer Olympics. In the 2008 games, Heymans was the country's flag-bearer at the opening ceremonies. Heymans won the inaugural Transalp Mountain Bike stage race in 1998 and then the first Absa Cape Epic in 2004.

Olympic Games
Preceded by Paulus Ambunda	Flagbearer for Namibia; Beijing 2008	Succeeded by Gaby Ahrens
