= Monica Dahl =

Namibian swimmer (born 1975)

Personal information
- Born: 10 July 1975 (age 50)

Sport
- Sport: Swimming
Medal record
Women's swimming
Representing Namibia
All-Africa Games
Bronze medal – third place	1991 Cairo	50 m freestyle

Monica Anja Dahl-Böhm (born 10 July 1975) is a Namibian swimmer. Of German descent, Dahl competed at the 1992 Summer Olympics and 1996 Summer Olympics for Namibia. She was one of the first Namibian athletes to compete in the Olympics, and the first woman to represent the nation at the Olympics.
