= Pyambuugiin Tuul =

Mongolian long-distance runner (born 1959)

Pyambuugiin Tuul (Mongolian: Пямбуугийн Туул; born February 17, 1959) is a retired long-distance runner from Mongolia, who represented his native country in the men's marathon at the 1992 Summer Olympics in Barcelona, Spain. He lost his sight in both eyes at age 19, but had sight in one eye restored before taking up the marathon.

== See also ==
- Luvsanlkhündegiin Otgonbayar, Mongolian competitor who finished last in the Olympic marathon in 2004
- Abdul Baser Wasiqi, Afghan Olympic marathoner in 1996, who finished last and comprised his country's entire Olympic team
