= Louisette Thobi =

Cameroonian sprinter

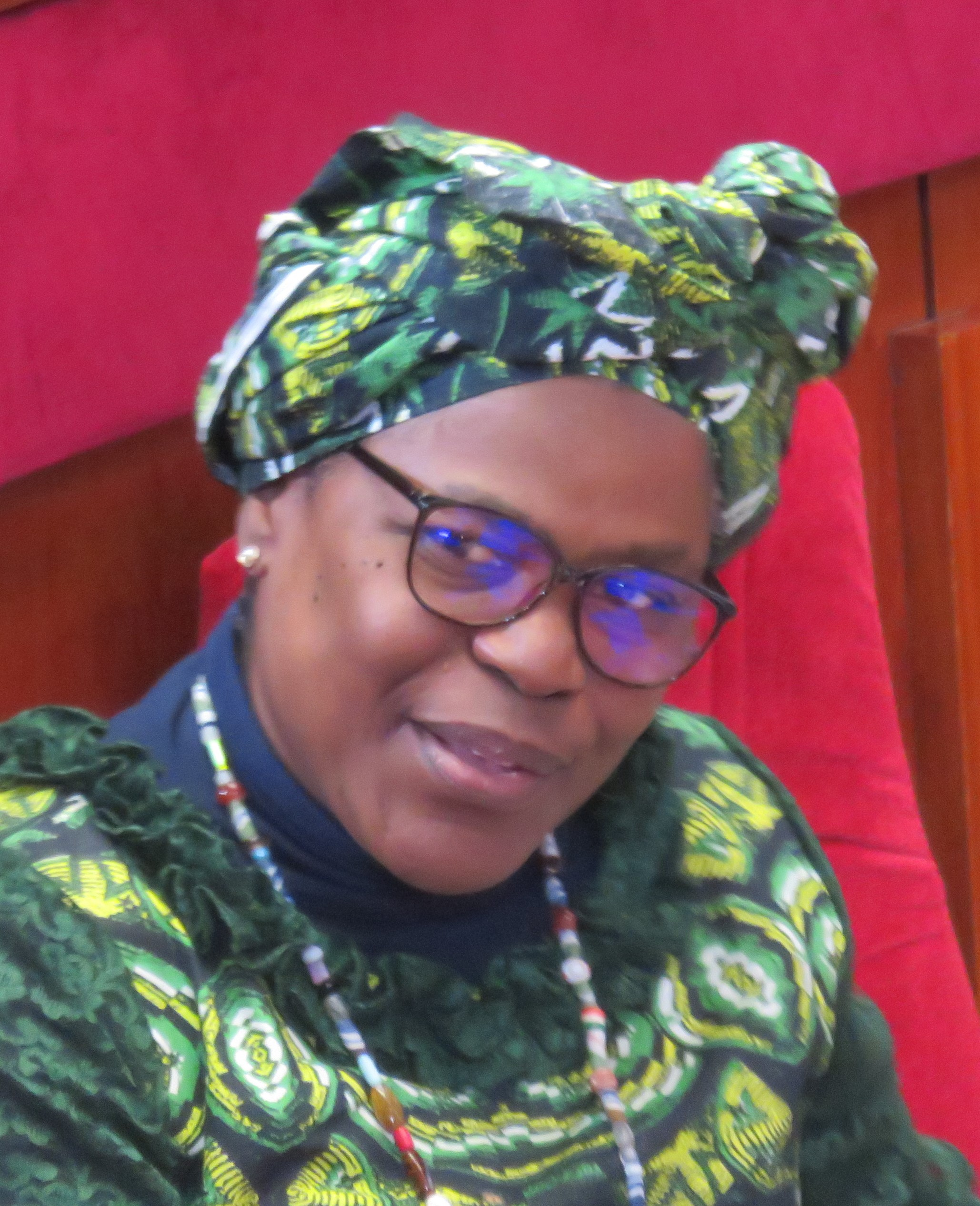
- Louisete Thobi in 2024.

Personal information
- Nationality: Cameroonian
- Born: 19 June 1967 (age 59)

Sport
- Sport: Sprinting
- Event: 4 × 100 metres relay

Louisette Renée Thobi (born 19 June 1967) is a Cameroonian sprinter. She competed in the women's 4 × 100 metres relay at the 1992 Summer Olympics.
