= Friedhelm Sack =

Namibian sports shooter

Medal record

Representing Namibia

Men's shooting

Commonwealth Games
Bronze medal – third place	2002 Manchester	Air Pistol Team
Bronze medal – third place	2006 Melbourne	10m Air Pistol

Friedhelm Ferdinand Sack (born 30 May 1956 in Mariental) is a Namibian sport shooter. He competed at the 1996 Summer Olympics, 2000 Summer Olympics and 2004 Summer Olympics for his country. He is affiliated with the Windhoek Central Shooting Club.

Olympic results
Event	1996	2000	2004
50 metre pistol	—	32nd 543	41st 529
10 metre air pistol	8th 680.2 (583)	34th 565	33rd 572

Olympic Games
Preceded by Frankie Fredericks	Flagbearer for Namibia; Atlanta 1996	Succeeded by Paulus Ali Nuumbembe
