= Paulus Ambunda =

Namibian boxer (born 1980)

Personal information
- Nickname: The Rock
- Nationality: Namibian
- Born: Paulus Natangwe Ambunda; August 6, 1980 (age 45) Swakopmund, Namibia
- Height: 5 ft 4 in (163 cm)
- Weight: Bantamweight; Super bantamweight

Boxing career
- Reach: 69 in (175 cm)
- Stance: Orthodox

Boxing record
- Total fights: 30
- Wins: 27
- Win by KO: 11
- Losses: 3
Medal record
Representing Namibia
African Games
Silver medal – second place	2003 Abuja	Flyweight

Paulus Natangwe Ambunda (born 6 August 1980) is a Namibian boxer who participated in the 2004 Summer Olympics. As a professional, he held the WBO bantamweight title in 2013, and twice the IBO bantamweight title in 2015 and in 2018.

== Amateur career ==
Ambunda won the silver medal at flyweight at the 2004 All-Africa Games in Abuja, Nigeria. At the 2004 Summer Olympics he was stopped in the quarter-finals of the flyweight (51 kg) division by Germany's eventual bronze medal winner Rustamhodza Rahimov.

== Professional career ==
Ambunda won the WBO bantamweight title against Thai fighter Pungluang Sor Singyu in his 20th fight. he would end up losing the belt in his first defense to Japanese fighter Tomoki Kameda.

== Professional boxing record ==
30 fights	27 wins	3 losses
By knockout	11	0
By decision	16	3

No.	Result	Record	Opponent	Type	Round	Date	Location	Notes
30	Loss	27–3	Stephen Fulton	UD	12	11 May 2019	EagleBank Arena, Fairfax, U.S.	Lost IBO super bantamweight title
29	Win	27–2	Muhamad Ridhwan	SD	12	29 Sep 2018	Marina Bay Sands Hotel, Singapore	Won vacant IBO super bantamweight title
28	Win	26–2	Nasibu Ramadhan	UD	12	29 Dec 2017	The Dome, Swakopmund, Namibia	Won WBC International Silver super bantamweight title
27	Win	25–2	Tasha Mjuaji	KO	2 (8)	30 Sep 2017	Paresis Stadium, Otjiwarongo, Namibia	
26	Loss	24–2	Moises Flores	UD	12	11 Jun 2016	Ramatex Factory, Windhoek, Namibia	Lost IBO super bantamweight title; For WBA interim super bantamweight title
25	Win	24–1	Jason Cooper	UD	12	5 Dec 2015	Ramatex Factory, Windhoek, Namobia	Retained IBO super bantamweight title
24	Win	23–1	Leandro David Esperante	SD	12	1 Aug 2015	Ramatex Factory, Windhoek, Namibia	Won vacant IBO super bantamweight title
23	Win	22–1	Tshifhiwa Munyai	SD	12	20 Dec 2014	Helao Nafidi, Oshikango, Namibia	
22	Win	21–1	Cristian Palma	UD	12	17 May 2014	Omuthiya Park, Oshikoto, Namibia	Won vacant IBF and WBA International super bantamweight titles
21	Loss	20–1	Tomoki Kameda	UD	12	1 Aug 2013	Waterfront Hotel & Casino, Cebu City, Philippines	Lost WBO bantamweight title
20	Win	20–0	Pungluang Sor Singyu	UD	12	2 Mar 2013	Windhoek Country Club Resort, Windhoek, Namibia	Won WBO bantamweight title
19	Win	19–0	William Prado	UD	12	28 Jul 2012	Ramatex Factory, Windhoek, Namibia	Won vacant WBO International bantamweight title
18	Win	18–0	Cleutus Mbhele	UD	12	20 Mar 2012	Windhoek Country Club Resort, Windhoek, Namibia	Retained WBO African bantamweight title
17	Win	17–0	Bongani Mahlangu	SD	12	5 Nov 2011	Windhoek Country Club Resort, Windhoek, Namibia	Retained WBO African bantamweight title
16	Win	16–0	Twalib Mubiru	TKO	3 (10)	24 Sep 2011	Windhoek Country Club Resort, Windhoek, Namibia	
15	Win	15–0	Emilio Norfat	KO	12 (12)	11 Jun 2011	Windhoek Country Club Resort, Windhoek, Namibia	Retained WBO African bantamweight title
14	Win	14–0	Tawanda Chigwida	TKO	8 (12)	25 Nov 2010	Windhoek Country Club Resort, Windhoek, Namibia	Retained WBO African bantamweight title
13	Win	13–0	Klaas Mboyane	UD	12	24 Jul 2010	Windhoek Country Club Resort, Windhoek, Namibia	Retained WBO African bantamweight title
12	Win	12–0	Sipho Nkadimeng	UD	8	29 May 2010	Kalahari Sands Hotel, Windhoek, Namibia	
11	Win	11–0	Tendani Munyai	TKO	3 (12)	30 Apr 2010	Windhoek Country Club Resort, Windhoek, Namibia	Won WBO African bantamweight title
10	Win	10–0	Sithembile Kibiti	KO	1 (12)	20 Mar 2010	Windhoek Country Club Resort, Windhoek, Namibia	
9	Win	9–0	Lwazi Mzolisa	TKO	2 (12)	31 Oct 2009	Kuisebmond Community Hall, Walvis Bay, Namibia	Won WBO interim African bantamweight title
8	Win	8–0	Tommy Nakashimba	TKO	2 (10)	12 Sep 2009	Windhoek Country Club Resort, Windhoek, Namibia	Won vacant Namibian bantamweight title
7	Win	7–0	Pfariso Neluvhulani	UD	6	25 Jul 2009	Windhoek Country Club Resort, Windhoek, Namibia	
6	Win	6–0	Matheus Niitembu	RTD	1 (4)	22 May 2009	Windhoek Country Club Resort, Windhoek, Namibia	
5	Win	5–0	Daniel Ausiku	TKO	2 (4)	11 Dec 2008	Windhoek Country Club Resort, Windhoek, Namibia	
4	Win	4–0	Johannes Gabriel	TKO	1 (4)	16 Aug 2008	Windhoek Country Club Resort, Windhoek, Namibia	
3	Win	3–0	Petaneni Elago	UD	4	10 Nov 2007	Ongwediva Trade Fair Centre, Ongwediva, Namibia	
2	Win	2–0	Johannes Gabriel	PTS	4	11 Aug 2007	Windhoek Country Club Resort, Windhoek, Namibia	
1	Win	1–0	Johannes Gabriel	PTS	4	30 Jun 2007	Swakopmund Hotel & Entertainment Centre, Namibia	

== See also ==
- List of bantamweight boxing champions

Sporting positions
Major world boxing titles
Preceded by Pungluang Sor Singyu	WBO bantamweight champion March 2, 2013 - August 1, 2013	Succeeded by Tomoki Kameda
Minor world boxing titles
Vacant Title last held by Thabo Sonjica	IBO super bantamweight champion August 1, 2015 - June 11, 2016; Vacated	Succeeded by Moises Flores
Olympic Games
Preceded by Paulus Ali Nuumbembe	Flagbearer for Namibia; Athens 2004	Succeeded by Mannie Heymans
