= Luketz Swartbooi =

Namibian long-distance runner

Luketz Swartbooi (born 7 February 1966) is a retired Namibian long-distance runner.

== Career ==
In 1992, Swartbooi won the Rössing Marathon with a time of 2:11:23 min, a record that still stands. At the 1993 World Championships in Stuttgart he won silver in the marathon. Swartbooi set his personal best in Boston 1994 in 2:09:08 min, finishing 3rd. At the 2000 Summer Olympics he finished 48th.

In 2005, Swartbooi received a public warning from the IAAF for testing positive for prednisolone/prednisone.

== Achievements ==
Year	Competition	Venue	Position	Event	Notes
Representing Namibia
1992	Olympic Games	Barcelona, Spain	—	Marathon	DNF
1993	World Championships	Stuttgart, Germany	2nd	Marathon	2:14:11
1997	World Championships	Athens, Greece	—	Marathon	DNF
2000	Olympic Games	Sydney, Australia	48th	Marathon	2:22:55
2001	World Championships	Edmonton, Canada	28th	Marathon	2:25:40
2002	Commonwealth Games	Manchester, United Kingdom	5th	Marathon	2:13:40
