= Gaby Ahrens =

Namibian sport shooter (born 1981)

Medal record

Representing Namibia

Women's shooting

Commonwealth Games
Bronze medal – third place	2010 New Delhi	Trap

Gaby Diana Ahrens (born 15 March 1981 in Windhoek) is a Namibian sport shooter. She competed at the 2008, 2012 and 2016 Summer Olympics in the women's trap event.

Ranked Number 1 on the African Continent for many years, Ahrens has won two African Championship Titles in 2011 and 2015 as well as several Namibian, South African and Angolan National Titles in Olympic Trap Shooting. Ahrens was awarded Namibia Sports Woman of the Year in 2010, the same year she won a bronze medal at the Commonwealth Games in New Delhi. At the 2012 Summer Olympics, she was the Namibian flag-bearer, the first woman of her country to receive this honor. At the 2016 Summer Olympics, she again competed in the women's trap, where she finished in 9th place, just one target off the finals.

She retired from competitive sport in 2016 and runs her own business in Windhoek. She currently serves as vice president on the Namibia National Olympic Committee and is an Athletes Representative of the Africa National Olympic Committee Association ANOCA and of the World Anti Doping Agency WADA. Ahrens has a master's degree in sports management through the International Olympic Committee MEMOS in Lausanne, Switzerland. Her efforts aim at supporting African elite athletes in competition and is taking steps to counter the negative influencing factors related to organizational stressors affecting athletes performance.

Olympic Games
Preceded by Mannie Heymans	Flagbearer for Namibia; London 2012	Succeeded by Jonas Junias
