= Beata Naigambo =

Namibian long-distance runner

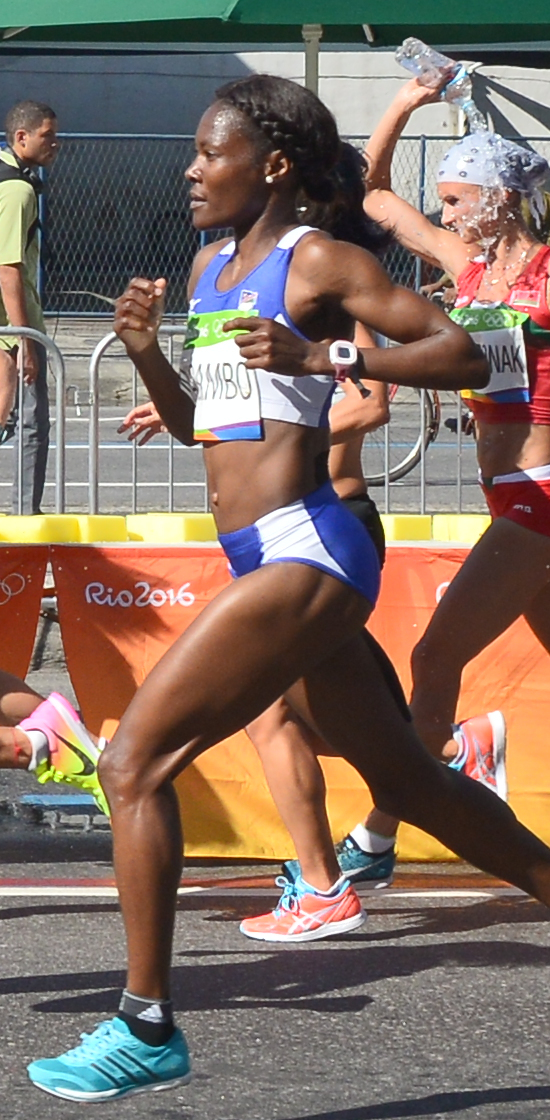
- Naigambo at the Rio 2016 Olympics

Personal information
- Full name: Beata Nandjala Naigambo
- Born: 11 March 1980 (age 46) Windhoek, Khomas Region, Namibia
- Height: 1.60 m (5 ft 3 in)
- Weight: 48 kg (106 lb)

Sport
- Country: Namibia
- Sport: Athletics
- Event: Marathon

Beata Nandjala Naigambo (born 11 March 1980 in Windhoek, Khomas Region) is a Namibian long-distance runner who specializes in the marathon. Her personal best time is 2:27:28, set at the Hamburg Marathon in April 2015.

She competed at the 2008 Summer Olympics, where she finished 28th out of 81 total participants in the Women's marathon.

At the 2012 Summer Olympics she finished 38th out of 107 finishers with a time of 2:31:16.

== Achievements ==
Year	Competition	Venue	Position	Event	Notes
Representing Namibia
2002	Commonwealth Games	Manchester, United Kingdom	9th	Marathon	2:47:22
2006	Commonwealth Games	Melbourne, Australia	–	Marathon	DNF
2007	Universiade	Bangkok, Thailand	10th	Half marathon	1:21:09
2008	Olympic Games	Beijing, China	28th	Marathon	2:33:29
2009	World Championships	Berlin, Germany	24th	Marathon	2:33:05
2009	Eindhoven Marathon	Eindhoven, Netherlands	1st	Marathon	2:31:01
2010	Commonwealth Games	New Delhi, India	4th	Marathon	2:36:43
2012	Olympic Games	London, United Kingdom	38th	Marathon	2:31:16
2014	Glasgow Marathon	Glasgow, United Kingdom	11th	Marathon	2:39:23
2015	World Championships	Beijing, China		Marathon	DNF
2015	Hamburg Marathon	Hamburg, Germany	3 rd	Marathon	2:27:28
