= Alex Miller (cyclist) =

Namibian cyclist (born 2000)

Personal information
- Full name: Alexander Miller
- Born: 20 November 2000 (age 25)

Cycling career
- Sport: Cycling
- Current team: Swatt Club
- Disciplines: Road; Mountain biking
- Role: Rider

Amateur teams
- 2018–2020: MBM Racing
- 2019: World Cycling Centre
- 2021: Mannie's Bike Mecca
- 2022: Pupkewitz Megatech
- 2023: MBM Racing
- 2024: Team Cathy
- 2025–: Swatt Club

Major wins
- One-day races and Classics National Road Race Championships (2019, 2024, 2025)
Medal record
Representing Namibia
Men's cycle racing
Commonwealth Games
| Bronze medal – third place | 2022 Birmingham | Cross-country |

Alex Miller (born 20 November 2000) is a Namibian road cyclist and mountain biker. He has won the Namibian National Road Race Championships three times.

== Major results ==
=== Road ===
2017
National Junior Championships

2nd Road race
2nd Time trial

2018
3rd Team time trial, African Junior Championships
2019
1st Road race, National Championships
National Under-23 Championships

1st Road race
1st Time trial

3rd Nedbank Cycle Classic
2021
National Under-23 Championships

1st Road race
1st Time trial

2024
1st Road race, National Championships
2025
National Championships

1st Road race
1st Time trial

=== Mountain Bike ===
2017
3rd Cross-country, African Junior Championships
2018
1st Cross-country, African Junior Championships
2019
1st Cross-country, National Championships
African Games

2nd Cross-country
3rd Marathon

African Championships

2nd Team relay
3rd Cross-country

2020
1st Cross-country, National Championships
1st Marathon, National Championships
2021
1st Cross-country, National Championships
1st Marathon, National Championships
2022
1st Cross-country, African Championships
National Championships

1st Cross-country
1st Marathon

3rd Cross-country, Commonwealth Games
2023
National Championships

1st Cross-country
1st Cross-country short track

2024
National Championships

1st Cross-country
1st Cross-country short track

African Championships

2nd Cross-country
3rd Cross-country short track

Olympic Games
| Preceded by Maike Diekmann; Jonas Jonas | Flagbearer for Namibia; Paris 2024 with Vera Looser | Succeeded by Incumbent |
