= Jonas Jonas =

Namibian boxer (born 1993)

Personal information
- Born: Jonas Junias Jonas; 24 November 1993 (age 32) Swakopmund, Namibia
- Height: 1.81 m (5 ft 11 in)
- Weight: 64 kg (141 lb)

Boxing career
- Weight class: Light welterweight
Medal record
Men's amateur boxing
Representing Namibia
Commonwealth Games
Gold medal – first place	2018 Gold Coast	Light welterweight
Silver medal – second place	2014 Glasgow	Light welterweight
African Games
Silver medal – second place	2015 Brazzaville	Light welterweight
Bronze medal – third place	2019 Rabat	Super lightweight
African Championships
Gold medal – first place	2017 Brazzaville	Light welterweight

Jonas Junias Jonas (born 24 November 1993 in Swakopmund) is a Namibian boxer and a participant in the 2016 Summer Olympics and 2020 Summer Olympics.

== Career ==
Jonas attended Vrederede Primary School, Atlantic Junior Secondary School, and SI Gobs Secondary School. He gained fame in 2014 when he won a silver medal at the Commonwealth Games at the age of 20. In the process, he became only the fourth Namibian boxer to win a medal at the Commonwealth Games.

He competed in the men's light welterweight class at the 2016 Summer Olympics in Rio de Janeiro. He was defeated by Hassan Amzile of France in the round of 32. He was the flagbearer for Namibia during the Parade of Nations.

Olympic Games
Preceded by Gaby Ahrens	Flagbearer for Namibia; Rio de Janeiro 2016 Tokyo 2020 with Maike Diekmann	Succeeded by Vera Looser; Alex Miller
