= Namibia at the Olympics =

- IOC code: NAM
- NOC: Namibia National Olympic Committee
- Website: olympic.org.na
- Medals Ranked 121st: Gold 0 Silver 5 Bronze 0 Total 5

Summer appearances
- 1992; 1996; 2000; 2004; 2008; 2012; 2016; 2020; 2024

Namibia first participated at the Olympic Games in 1992, and has sent athletes to compete in every Summer Olympic Games since then. The nation has never participated in the Winter Olympic Games.

Namibian athletes have won a total of five medals, all silver medals. Frankie Fredericks won four medals in athletics across two Olympics.

The Namibian National Olympic Committee was created in 1990 and recognized by the International Olympic Committee in 1991.

== Timeline of participation ==
Olympic Year/s	Teams	
1904–1908	South Africa (ZAF)	
1912–1924	South Africa (ZAF)	
1928–1956	South Africa (ZAF)	
1960	South Africa (SAF)	
1964–1992 W		
1992 S	South Africa	Namibia
1994	South Africa	Namibia
1996–present	South Africa	Namibia

== Medal tables ==
=== Medals by Summer Games ===
Games	Athletes	Gold	Silver	Bronze	Total	Rank
1992 Barcelona	6	0	2	0	2	41
1996 Atlanta	8	0	2	0	2	55
2000 Sydney	11	0	0	0	0	–
2004 Athens	8	0	0	0	0	–
2008 Beijing	10	0	0	0	0	–
2012 London	9	0	0	0	0	–
2016 Rio de Janeiro	10	0	0	0	0	–
2020 Tokyo	11	0	1	0	1	77
2024 Paris	4	0	0	0	0	–
2028 Los Angeles	future event					
2032 Brisbane	future event					
Total		0	5	0	5	121

=== Medals by sport ===
Sport	Gold	Silver	Bronze	Total
Athletics	0	5	0	5
Totals (1 entries)	0	5	0	5

== List of medalists ==
Medal	Name	Games	Sport	Event
Silver	Frankie Fredericks	1992 Barcelona	Athletics	Men's 100 metres
Silver	Frankie Fredericks	1992 Barcelona	Athletics	Men's 200 metres
Silver	Frankie Fredericks	1996 Atlanta	Athletics	Men's 100 metres
Silver	Frankie Fredericks	1996 Atlanta	Athletics	Men's 200 metres
Silver	Christine Mboma	2020 Tokyo	Athletics	Women's 200 metres

== See also ==
- List of flag bearers for Namibia at the Olympics
- Category:Olympic competitors for Namibia
- Namibia at the Paralympics
