= Vera Looser =

Namibian cyclist (born 1993)

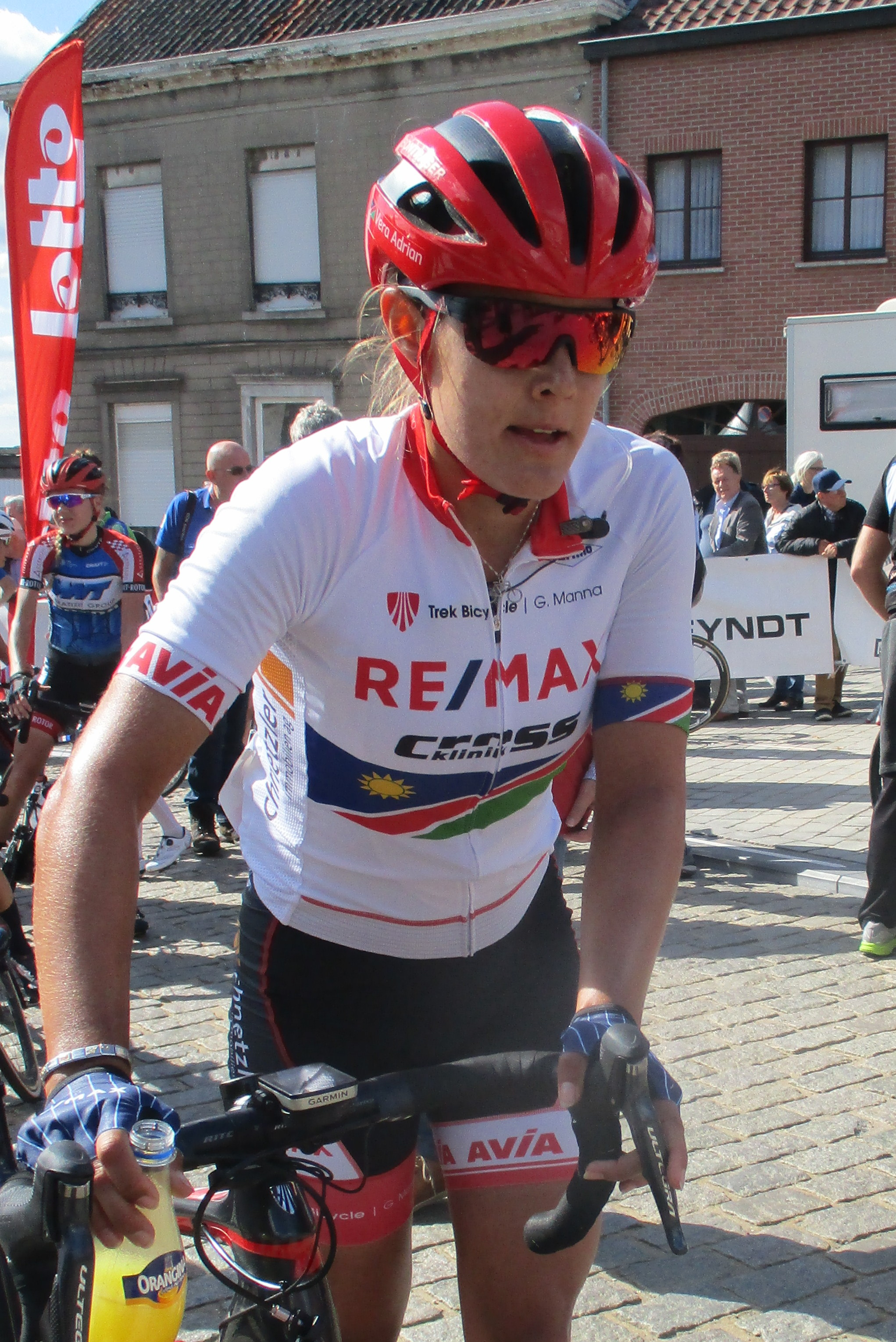
- Adrian at the 2018 Belgium Tour

Personal information
- Full name: Vera Looser
- Born: Vera Adrian; 28 October 1993 (age 32) Windhoek, Namibia

Cycling career
- Sport: Cycling
- Disciplines: Road; Mountain biking
- Role: Rider

Amateur teams
- 2016: Time Freight
- 2016: BH Cycling Team (guest)
- 2016: Maxx–Solar Cycling (guest)
- 2018–2020: RE/MAX Cycling Team

Professional teams
- 2017: Bizkaia–Durango
- 2021–: InstaFund Racing

Major wins
- One-day races and Classics National Time Trial Championships (2012, 2015–2017, 2019, 2021–2022) National Road Race Championships (2012, 2014–2022) Continental Time Trial Championships (2016) Continental Road Race Championships (2016)
Medal record
Women's road cycling
Representing Namibia
African Road Championships
Gold medal – first place	2016 Agadir	Road race
Gold medal – first place	2016 Agadir	Time trial
Silver medal – second place	2013 Sharm el-Sheikh	Road race
Silver medal – second place	2015 Wartburg	Team time trial
Bronze medal – third place	2012 Ouagadugou	Time trial
Bronze medal – third place	2013 Sharm el-Sheikh	Time trial
Bronze medal – third place	2021 Cairo	Road race
Bronze medal – third place	2021 Cairo	Time trial

Vera Looser (née Adrian; born 28 October 1993) is a Namibian road cyclist and mountain biker who most recently rode for UCI Women's Continental Team InstaFund Racing. She represented her nation at the 2014 and 2018 Commonwealth Games and at the 2016 Summer Olympics. She has won the Namibian National Time Trial Championships on seven occasions, and the Namibian National Road Race Championships on ten occasions, including nine years consecutively between 2014 and 2022.

== Major results ==
2012
National Road Championships

1st Road race
1st Time trial

African Road Championships

3rd Road race
7th Time trial

2013
African Road Championships

2nd Road race
3rd Time trial

2014
National Road Championships

1st Road race
2nd Time trial

2015
National Road Championships

1st Road race
1st Time trial

African Road Championships

2nd Team time trial
5th Time trial
9th Road race

African Games

4th Team time trial
5th Time trial
8th Road race

2016
African Road Championships

1st Road race
1st Time trial

National Road Championships

1st Road race
1st Time trial

4th KZN Summer Series 2
4th Steinmaur
2017
National Road Championships

1st Road race
1st Time trial

1st Grand Prix Olten
2nd GP Oberbaselbiet
4th Lakuntz
4th Emptinne
7th 947 Cycle Challenge
2018
National Road Championships

1st Road race
2nd Time trial

4th SwissEver GP Cham-Hagendorn
African Road Championships

6th Time trial
7th Road race

2019
National Road Championships

1st Road race
1st Time trial

African Games

3rd Road race
3rd Time trial

African Road Championships

5th Road race
6th Time trial

2020
1st Road race, National Road Championships
2021
National Road Championships

1st Road race
1st Time trial

African Road Championships

3rd Road race
3rd Time trial

2022
National Road Championships

1st Road race
1st Time trial

Olympic Games
Preceded by Maike Diekmann; Jonas Jonas	Flagbearer for Namibia; Paris 2024 with Alex Miller	Succeeded by Incumbent
