= Helalia Johannes =

Namibian long-distance runner

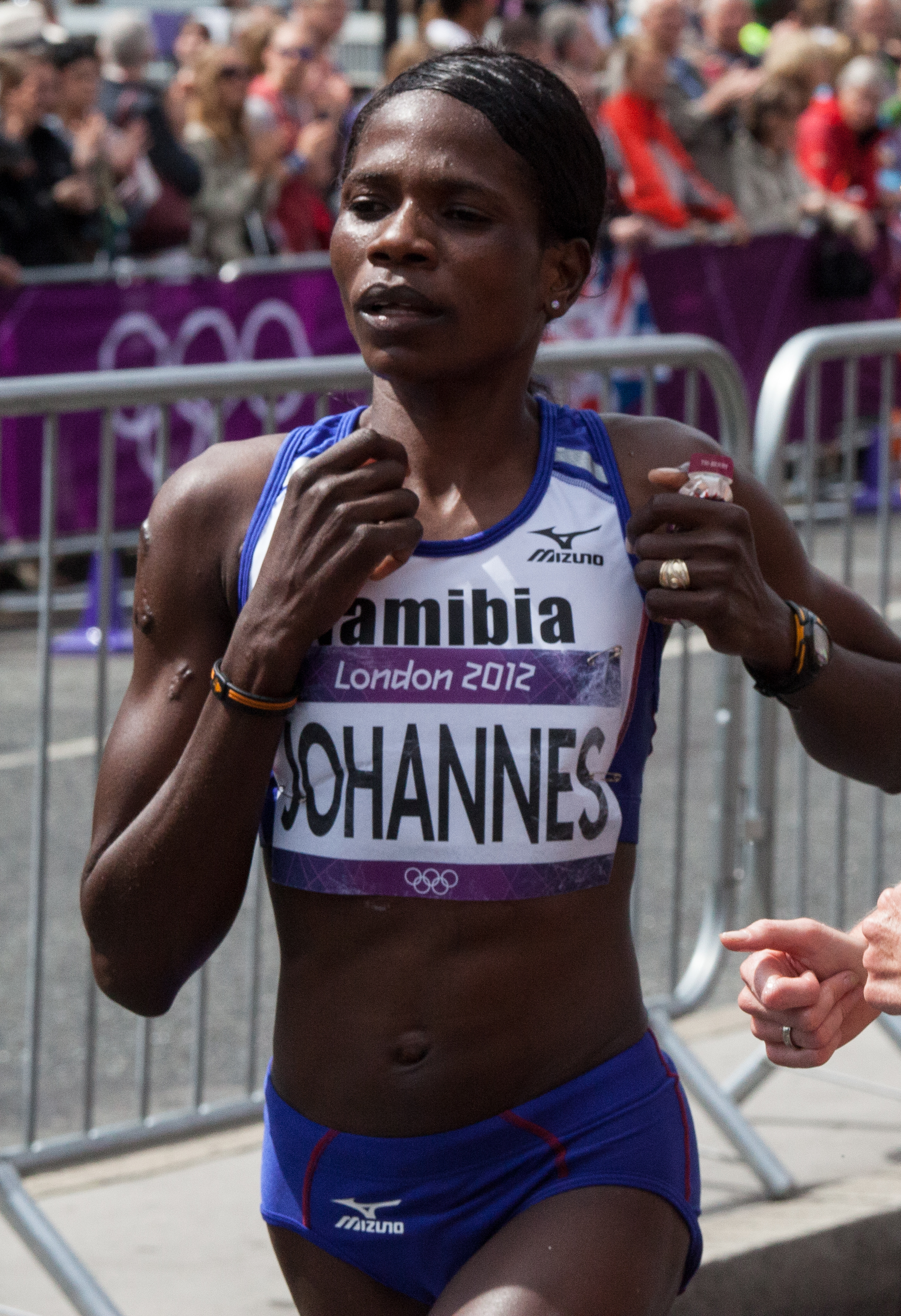
- Johannes in the Marathon at the 2012 Olympics in London

Personal information
- Nationality: Namibian
- Born: 13 August 1980 (age 45) Oshali, Namibia
- Height: 1.65 m (5 ft 5 in)
- Weight: 45 kg (99 lb)

Sport
- Country: Namibia
- Sport: Athletics
- Event: Marathon
Medal record
World Championships
Bronze medal – third place	2019 Doha	Marathon
Commonwealth Games
Gold medal – first place	2018 Gold Coast	Marathon
Bronze medal – third place	2022 Birmingham	Marathon
All-Africa Games
Bronze medal – third place	2011 Maputo	Half marathon
Military World Games
Bronze medal – third place	2011 Rio de Janeiro	Marathon

Helalia Lukeiko Johannes (born 13 August 1980), also known as Hilaria Johannes, is a Namibian long-distance runner who specializes in the marathon. She holds the Namibian records in the 10 km, 20 km, half marathon and marathon events.

At 39 years of age, she became a World Championships bronze medallist in the marathon. She represented her country at the 2008 Beijing Olympics, 2012 London Olympics and 2018 Commonwealth Games and has won medals at the World Championships, Military World Games, the All-Africa Games and at the 2018 Commonwealth Games.

== Biography ==
She was born in the village of Oshali in the Oshana Region. She is a five-time winner of the Two Oceans Half Marathon and holds the current record of 01:10:29.

Johannes made her international debut at the 2005 IAAF World Cross Country Championships, where she finished 80th in the women's long race. She came fifth in the half marathon of the 2007 Summer Universiade and completed the same feat at the 2007 All-Africa Games. She also ran in the Dublin Marathon that year, coming in fourth place.

Johannes ran a qualifying time (2:37:00) of 2:33:06 hours at the Seoul International Marathon in March 2008, qualifying her for the 2008 Summer Olympics. She placed fortieth in the rankings in the Olympic marathon race. She again represented her country on the global stage at the 2009 World Championships in Athletics but finished 56th in a slow time of 2:50:19 hours. She rebounded at the Dublin Marathon, finishing as the runner-up. The following year, she had one of her best international performances, coming 16th at the 2010 IAAF World Half Marathon Championships.

She was the 2011 winner of the Dublin Marathon in a personal best and Namibian national record run of 2:30:37 hours. That year, she won two bronze medals for Namibia, first in the marathon at the 2011 Military World Games and then in the half marathon at the 2011 All-Africa Games. She knocked more than three minutes off her then personal best at the 2012 Vienna Marathon, taking third place behind Olga Glok. At the 2012 Summer Olympics, Johannes knocked more than a minute off that personal best, finishing in 12th with a new best of 2:26:09 – a Namibian record. Her third and final marathon outing of 2012 came in Dublin, but she was somewhat slower and came sixth in a time of 2:35:01 hours.

She entered the 2013 Tokyo Marathon and finished in under two and a half hours, taking sixth place. She was chosen to represent Namibia in the marathon at the 2013 World Championships in Athletics but failed to finish. At the start of 2014, she ran 2:28:27 hours for third place at the Seoul International Marathon. At the 2014 Commonwealth Games, she was leading the marathon before an injury caused her to slow. She finished in 5th place.

Helalia won Namibia's second gold medal at the Commonwealth Games 2018 when she won the women's marathon. Johannes completed the 42,2 km marathon in 2 hours 32 minutes 40 seconds to finish well ahead of second-placed Lisa Weightman of Australia (2:33:23), while another Australian, Jess Trengrove, won bronze in 2:34:09. Johannes was the first Namibian woman to win a Commonwealth gold medal. Her husband, Japhet Uutoni, also won a gold medal for Namibia in boxing at the 2006 Commonwealth Games.

In 2019, Johannes broke three Namibian records. She broke the Namibian marathon record to win the Nagoya Marathon in a time of 2:22:25. She then broke the Namibian half-marathon record in April at the Two Oceans Half Marathon in Cape Town, running a winning time of 1:10:30. She then proceeded to break the 10 km record in Port Elizabeth with a time of 31.50.

In September, she achieved her greatest career landmark by earning a medal at the Athletics World Championships for her third place in the marathon.

In December 2020, she broke her own national marathon record, placing third at the Valencia Marathon in a time of 2:19:52; with this achievement, Namibia became the third African country to break the 2:20 barrier in women's marathon after Kenya and Ethiopia.

== Achievements ==
Year	Competition	Venue	Position	Event	Notes
Representing Namibia
2008	Olympic Games	Beijing, PR China	40th	Marathon	2:35:22
2011	All-Africa Games	Maputo, Mozambique	3rd	Half marathon	1:11:12
2012	Olympic Games	London, Great Britain	12th	Marathon	2:26:09 (PB)
2013	World Championships	Moscow, Russia	DNF	Marathon	DNF
2018	Commonwealth Games	Gold Coast, Australia	1st	Marathon	2:32:40
2019	World Championships	Doha, Qatar	3rd	Marathon	2:34:15
2021	Olympic Games	Sapporo, Japan	11th	Marathon	2:31:22
