= Frankie Fredericks =

Namibian sprinter (born 1967)

Frank Fredericks
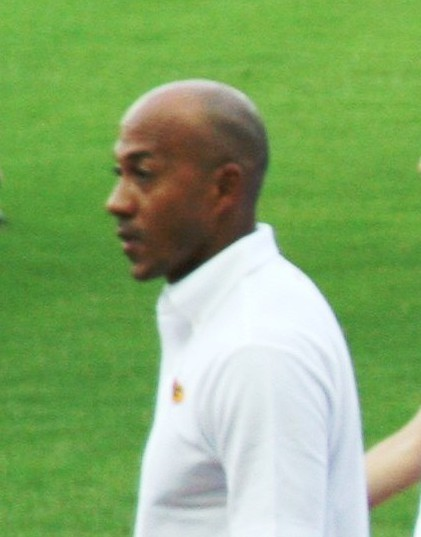
- Fredericks in 2007

Personal information
- Nationality: Namibian
- Born: 2 October 1967 (age 58) Windhoek, South West Africa
- Height: 180 cm (5 ft 11 in)
- Weight: 73 kg (161 lb; 11.5 st)

Sport
- Sport: Track and field
- Events: 100 metres, 200 metres
- College team: BYU Cougars
Medal record
Men's athletics
Representing Namibia
Olympic Games
| Silver medal – second place | 1992 Barcelona | 100 m |
| Silver medal – second place | 1992 Barcelona | 200 m |
| Silver medal – second place | 1996 Atlanta | 100 m |
| Silver medal – second place | 1996 Atlanta | 200 m |
World Championships
| Gold medal – first place | 1993 Stuttgart | 200 m |
| Silver medal – second place | 1991 Tokyo | 200 m |
| Silver medal – second place | 1995 Gothenburg | 200 m |
| Silver medal – second place | 1997 Athens | 200 m |
World Indoor Championships
| Gold medal – first place | 1999 Maebashi | 200 m |
| Silver medal – second place | 1993 Toronto | 60 m |
All-Africa Games
| Gold medal – first place | 1991 Cairo | 100 m |
| Gold medal – first place | 1991 Cairo | 200 m |
| Silver medal – second place | 2003 Abuja | 200 m |
| Bronze medal – third place | 1999 Johannesburg | 100 m |
African Championships
| Gold medal – first place | 1998 Dakar | 200 m |
| Gold medal – first place | 2002 Tunis | 100 m |
| Gold medal – first place | 2002 Tunis | 200 m |
| Silver medal – second place | 1998 Dakar | 100 m |
Commonwealth Games
| Gold medal – first place | 1994 Victoria | 200 m |
| Gold medal – first place | 2002 Manchester | 200 m |
| Silver medal – second place | 1998 Kuala Lumpur | 100 m |
| Bronze medal – third place | 1994 Victoria | 100 m |
Goodwill Games
| Bronze medal – third place | 1994 Saint Petersburg | 200 m |
Representing Africa
World Cup
| Gold medal – first place | 1998 Johannesburg | 200 m |
| Silver medal – second place | 1994 London | 200 m |
| Silver medal – second place | 2002 Madrid | 200 m |
| Bronze medal – third place | 1998 Johannesburg | 4 × 100 m relay |
| Bronze medal – third place | 2002 Madrid | 4 × 100 m relay |

Frank "Frankie" Fredericks (born 2 October 1967) is a Namibian former track and field sprinter athlete. Running in the 100 metres and 200 metres, he won four silver medals at the Olympic Games (two in 1992 and two in 1996), making him Namibia's only Olympic medalist until Christine Mboma's silver medal at the 2020 Olympics in Tokyo. He also won gold medals at the World Championships, World Indoor Championships, All-Africa Games and Commonwealth Games. He is the world indoor record-holder for 200 metres, with a time of 19.92 seconds set in 1996.

Fredericks has broken 20 seconds for the 200 metres 24 times. He also holds the joint-third-fastest non-winning time for the 200 metres. In August 1996, Fredericks ran 19.68 seconds in the Olympic final in Atlanta, Georgia.

He is also the oldest man to have broken 20 seconds for the 200 metres. On 12 July 2002 in Rome, Fredericks won the 200 metres in a time of 19.99 seconds at the age of 34 years 283 days. He previously served as a council member in the IAAF.

On 3 March 2017, Fredericks was implicated in the IAAF corruption scandal, stemming from a large cash payment he received in 2009.

In November 2017, French authorities formally indicted Fredericks on charges of passive corruption and money laundering in connection with a vote-buying scheme for the 2016 Rio Olympics.

== Education and early life ==
Fredericks was born in Windhoek, the only child of Riekie Fredericks, a seamstress, and Andries Kangootui, a farmer. He grew up in the city's Katutura township, his parents splitting up while he was little. In 1981 he switched to the Catholic school at Döbra to play competitive soccer. When he received a scholarship to complete his matric at Concordia College Fredericks took up athletics because the soccer was not strong at Concordia. He still played for Black Africa, one of the country's top teams.

After school, he took up work at Rössing Uranium Ltd. in Swakopmund and soon got a partial scholarship at Brigham Young University in the US in 1987. There he studied computer science and graduated with an MBA.

During his college career, Fredericks earned numerous All-American citations and won three NCAA championships.

=== Athletics career ===
In 1990, after his country had become independent of South Africa, Fredericks could participate in international competition. At the World Championships in 1991, Fredericks won a silver medal in the 200 m, finishing behind Michael Johnson, and placed 5th in the 100 m. The following year, at the Barcelona 1992 Summer Olympics, Fredericks became Namibia's first Olympic medalist when he finished second in both the 100 m and 200 m. He won the silver medal in the men's 100-metre dash, with a time of 10.02 seconds, just .06 seconds behind the gold medal winner. In 1993, in Stuttgart, he became the nation's first World Champion, winning the 200 m. At the 1994 Commonwealth Games, he won gold in the 200 m and bronze in the 100 m. His time of 19.97 seconds in the 200 metres is the current Commonwealth Games record. At the 1995 World Championships 100 m, after crossing the line he immediately went to help his friend Linford Christie who pulled a muscle in the race and signalled for help. This act of kindness endeared him to many (particularly British) athletics fans.

For the 1996 Summer Olympics, Fredericks was among the title favourites for both the 100 m and 200 m. He reached both finals and again finished second in both. In the 100 m, he was beaten by Donovan Bailey, who set a new World Record, and in the 200 m, he was beaten by Michael Johnson, who also set a new World Record. At the time, Fredericks's second-place run was the third-fastest in history, beaten only by Johnson (twice). At the 1998 Commonwealth Games in Kuala Lumpur, Malaysia, Frankie once again missed out on the chance of gold in the 100 m; he was beaten by Ato Boldon of Trinidad and Tobago.

Suffering from injuries, Fredericks had to withdraw from the 1999 and 2001 World Championships, and the 2000 Summer Olympics. When he arrived in Abuja to represent Namibia at the 2003 All-Africa Games, he was lauded by Nigerian supporters and came away with a silver medal. He then went on to win the 200 m at the inaugural Afro-Asian Games in 2003. In the 200 m final at the 2004 Summer Olympics, he finished 4th.

After the end of the 2004 outdoor season, Fredericks retired from competition. He had run the 100 m under 10 seconds 27 times.

==== Personal bests ====
- All information taken from athlete's World Athletics profile.

| Category | Distance | Performance | Wind | Location | Date |
|---|---|---|---|---|---|
| Outdoor | 100 metres | 9.86 | – 0.4 m/s | Lausanne | 3 July 1996 |
| Outdoor | 200 metres | 19.68 | + 0.4 m/s | Atlanta | 1 August 1996 |
| Outdoor | 400 metres | 46.28 | | Tempe | 25 March 1989 |
| Indoor | 50 metres | 5.77 | | Liévin | 24 February 2002 |
| Indoor | 60 metres | 6.51 | | Toronto | 12 March 1993 |
| Indoor | 100 metres | 10.05 | | Tampere | 12 February 1996 |
| Indoor | 200 metres | 19.92 | | Liévin | 18 February 1996 |
| Indoor | 300 metres | 32.36 | | Karlsruhe | 28 February 2003 |
| Indoor | Long jump | 7.57 m | | Colorado Springs | 22 February 1991 |

== IOC career ==
In 2004 Fredericks became a member of the International Olympic Committee. In 2009 Fredericks became the head of the Athletics Namibia in a controversial leadership contest. In 2012 Fredericks was nominated to be a member of the International Olympic Committee.

Frank Fredericks is a member of the 'Champions for Peace' club, a group of elite athletes committed to serving peace in the world through sport, created by Peace and Sport, a Monaco-based international organisation.

=== Bribery investigation ===
On 3 March 2017, French newspaper Le Monde reported that Fredericks had received US$299,300 from Pamodzi Sports Consulting, a company owned by Papa Massata Diack (the son of disgraced former IAAF head Lamine Diack, who is currently facing corruption charges in France). The payment went to Yemi Limited, a company set up by Fredericks in Seychelles, a tax haven, and was made on 2 October 2009, the same day as Rio was announced as the winning bid for the 2016 Olympics. Fredericks has denied that the payment has anything to do with the Olympic bid, but instead says it was fees paid for consulting services he provided for "relay championships" and marketing programs related to African championships and other IAAF programs.

When the allegation was made, Fredericks was the chair of the 2024 Olympic bid evaluation committee. On 6 March 2017, Fredericks stepped down from his position in the IAAF task force that is evaluating if or when to re-admit Russia's national sports body RusAF after a widespread doping scandal. On 7 March 2017, the Ethics Commission of the IOC recommended a provisional suspension of Fredericks from his IOC-related duties. Before the IOC Executive meeting Fredericks while maintaining his innocence withdrew from his position as the Chair of the 2024 Olympic bidding process "in the best interests" of the process. Fredericks was replaced as the chair of the 2024 Olympic bidding process by former FIBA secretary general Patrick Baumann. Fredericks' formal indictment later that year was viewed as a significant blow to the credibility of the International Olympic Committee under President Thomas Bach. Because Fredericks was a highly respected former athlete entrusted with evaluating the 2024 bids, his direct financial links to the Diack family's vote-buying network highlighted the deep structural vulnerabilities and ongoing ethical crises within the highest levels of the IOC membership.

== Business career ==
After his athletic career, Fredericks worked as a business manager. He also founded the Frank Fredericks Foundation in 1999, a non-profit organisation supporting talented athletes.

== See also ==
- List of champions of African athletics
- IAAF doping controversy

Records
| Preceded by Olapade Adeniken | Men's 200m African Record Holder; 3 August 1992 – 23 July 2023 | Succeeded by Letsile Tebogo |
| Preceded by Linford Christie | Men's 200m Indoor World Record Holder; 18 February 1996 – present | Incumbent |
Achievements
| Preceded by Michael Marsh | Men's 200 m Best Year Performance; 1993 | Succeeded by John Regis |
Olympic Games
| Preceded by None | Flagbearer for Namibia; Barcelona 1992 | Succeeded by Friedhelm Sack |
