= Namibia National Olympic Committee =

National Olympic Committee

- Country: Namibia
- Code: NAM
- Created: 28 May 1990
- Recognized: 1991
- Continental Association: ANOCA
- Headquarters: Cricket Street, NCG Building, Olympia Suburb, Windhoek, Namibia
- President: Dr. Ndeulipula Hamutumwa
- CEO: Anri Parker
- Website: Official website

The Namibia National Olympic Committee (IOC code: NAM) is the National Olympic Committee representing Namibia. It was created in 1990 and recognised by the IOC in 1992

Namibia made its debut at the 1992 Summer Olympics in Barcelona where it was represented by six athletes.

== Presidents of Committee ==
- present – Ndeulipula Hamutumwa

== See also ==
- Namibia at the Olympics
- Namibia at the Commonwealth Games
