= Namibia at the 2018 Commonwealth Games =

- Flag of Namibia
- CG code: NAM
- CGA: Namibian National Olympic Committee

in Gold Coast, Australia 4 April 2018 – 15 April 2018
- Competitors: 28 in 7 sports
- Flag bearer: Ananias Shikongo (opening)
- Medals Ranked 19th: Gold 2 Silver 0 Bronze 0 Total 2

Commonwealth Games appearances (overview)
- 1994; 1998; 2002; 2006; 2010; 2014; 2018; 2022; 2026; 2030

Namibia competed at the 2018 Commonwealth Games in the Gold Coast, Australia from April 4 to April 15, 2018.

The Namibian team consisted of 30 (20 men and 10 women) athletes competing in seven sports.

Para track and field athlete Ananias Shikongo was the country's flag bearer during the opening ceremony.

== Medalists ==
Medal	Name	Sport	Event	Date
Gold	Jonas Jonas	Boxing	Men's −64 kg	April 14
Gold	Helalia Johannes	Athletics	Women's marathon	April 15

== Competitors ==
The following is the list of number of competitors participating at the Games per sport/discipline.

Sport	Men	Women	Total
Athletics	6	3	9
Boxing	3	0	3
Cycling	4	2	6
Gymnastics	1	0	1
Lawn bowls	4	4	8
Triathlon	1	0	1
Total	19	9	28

== Athletics ==
Men
Track & road events

Athlete	Event	Heat		Final	
Athlete	Event	Result	Rank	Result	Rank
Ananias Shikongo; Guide: Even Tjiviju	100 m T12	11.26	3 q	11.37	4
Hardus Maritz	400 m hurdles	50.41	5	did not advance	
Uveni Kugongelwa	Marathon	—N/a		DNF	
Namupala Reonard	Marathon	—N/a		DNF	

Field events

Athlete	Event	Qualification		Final	
Athlete	Event	Distance	Rank	Distance	Rank
Roger Haitengi	Triple jump	16.36	3 q	16.24	8

Women
Track & road events

Athlete	Event	Final	
Athlete	Event	Result	Rank
Leena Ekandjo	Marathon	2:50:59	12
Lavinia Haitope	Marathon	2:40:54	7
Helalia Johannes	Marathon	2:32:40	1st place, gold medalist(s)

== Boxing ==
Namibia participated with a team of 3 athletes (3 men)

Men

Athlete	Event	Round of 32	Round of 16	Quarterfinals	Semifinals	Final	Rank
Athlete	Event	Opposition Result	Opposition Result	Opposition Result	Opposition Result	Opposition Result	Rank
Mathias Hamunyela	−49 kg	—N/a	Hassan (KEN); L 2-3	did not advance			
Tryagain Ndevelo	−60 kg	BYE	Garside (AUS); L 0-5	did not advance			
Jonas Jonas	−64 kg	Williams (BAH); W 5-0	Kondakov (SAM); W RSC	Saparamadu (SRI); W 5-0	McCormack (ENG); W 3-2	Blumenfeld (CAN); W 5-0	1st place, gold medalist(s)

== Cycling ==
Namibia participated with 6 athletes (4 men and 2 women).

=== Road ===
Men

Athlete	Event	Time	Rank
Dirk Coetzee	Road race	4:05:45	44
Dan Craven	Road race	3:59:35	40
Tristan De Lange	Road race	3:59:35	36
Martin Freyer	Road race	DNF	
Dirk Coetzee	Time trial	53:16.85	19
Martin Freyer	Time trial	58:12.22	37

Women

Athlete	Event	Time	Rank
Vera Adrian	Road race	3:03:32	15
Vera Adrian	Time trial	42:26.14	16
Michelle Vorster	Road race	3:03:32	21

=== Mountain bike ===
Athlete	Event	Time	Rank
Tristan De Lange	Men's cross-country	1:26:59	12
Michelle Vorster	Women's cross-country	1:23:37	8

== Gymnastics ==
=== Artistic ===
Namibia participated with 1 athlete (1 man).

Men
Individual Qualification

Athlete	Event	Apparatus						Total	Rank
Athlete	Event	F	PH	R	V	PB	HB	Total	Rank
Robert Honiball	Qualification	—N/a	7.900	—N/a		9.850	DNS	—N/a	

== Lawn bowls ==
Namibia will compete in Lawn bowls.

Men

Athlete	Event	Group Stage					Quarterfinal	Semifinal	Final / BM	
Athlete	Event	Opposition Score	Opposition Score	Opposition Score	Opposition Score	Rank	Opposition Score	Opposition Score	Opposition Score	Rank
Douw Calitz; Willem Esterhuizen; Carel Olivier	Triples	Niue; W 25 - 10	Canada; W 16 - 11	Singapore; L 15 - 20	New Zealand; L 8 - 28	3	did not advance			
Douw Calitz; Willem Esterhuizen; Carel Olivier; Graham Snyman	Fours	Northern Ireland; L 11 - 17	Niue; W 16 - 13	Fiji; L 11 - 14	Malaysia; L 11 - 14	4	did not advance			

Women

Athlete	Event	Group Stage					Quarterfinal	Semifinal	Final / BM	
Athlete	Event	Opposition Score	Opposition Score	Opposition Score	Opposition Score	Rank	Opposition Score	Opposition Score	Opposition Score	Rank
Sheena Du Toit; Johanna van den Bergh; Lesley Vermeulen	Triples	New Zealand; L 15 - 22	Jersey; L 12 - 15	Wales; L 14 - 15	Zambia; W 19 - 9	4	did not advance			
Sheena Du Toit; Johanna van den Bergh; Lesley Vermeulen; Anjuleen Viljoen	Fours	Malaysia; L 13 - 17	Papua New Guinea; D 12 - 12	Australia; L 9 - 23	Cook Islands; L 7 - 20	5	did not advance			

== Triathlon ==
Namibia participated with 1 athlete (1 man).

Individual

Athlete	Event	Swim (750 m)	Trans 1	Bike (20 km)	Trans 2	Run (5 km)	Total	Rank
Jean-Paul Burger	Men's	9:19	0:36	28:35	0:25	16:23	55:18	15

== See also ==
- Namibia at the 2018 Summer Youth Olympics
