= African Mountain Bike Championships =

The Union Cycliste Internationale African Mountain Bike Championships (French : Championnat d'Afrique de VTT) is the highest echelon of Mountain Bike racing on the African continent. First held in 2007 at Windhoek, Namibia the event has been contested every year since. It is ruled and managed by the African Cycling Confederation. Over the years top riders from South Africa, Kenya, Lesotho, Malawi, Rwanda, Mauritius, Namibia, Botswana and Zimbabwe have attended this prestigious race. The championships are an Olympic qualifying event.

== Editions ==
Year	Host country	Host city
2007	Namibia	Windhoek
2009	South Africa	Mankele
2011	South Africa	Cape Town
2012	Mauritius	Casela - Yemen
2013	South Africa	Pietermaritzburg
2014	South Africa	Cape Town
2015	Rwanda	Musanze
2016	Lesotho	Afriski
2017	Mauritius	Bel-Ombre
2018	Egypt	Wadi Degla
2019	Namibia	Windhoek
2020	COVID-19 Disruption	No event
2021	COVID-19 Disruption	No event
2022	Namibia	Windhoek
2023	South Africa	Johannesburg
2024	Morocco	Casablanca
2025	South Africa	Pietermaritzburg

== Men's summary ==
=== Elites ===
Year	Gold	Silver	Bronze
2007	(South Africa) Burry Stander	(South Africa) Ben Swanepoel	(Namibia) Mannie Heymans
2009	(Namibia) Marc Bassingthwaighte	(South Africa) Renay Groustra	(South Africa) Ben Swanepoel
2011	(South Africa) Burry Stander	(Namibia) Marc Bassingthwaighte	(South Africa) Philip Buys
2012	(South Africa) Philip Buys	(Namibia) Marc Bassingthwaighte	(Rwanda) Adrien Niyonshuti
2013	(South Africa) Philip Buys	(Mauritius) Yannick Lincoln	(Namibia) Heinrich Köhne
2014	(South Africa) Philip Buys	(South Africa) Lourens Luus	(South Africa) Rourke Croeser
2015	(South Africa) James Reid	(South Africa) Matthys Beukes	(South Africa) Rourke Croeser
2016	(South Africa) Philip Buys	(South Africa) James Reid	(South Africa) Arno Du Toit
2017	(South Africa) Alan Hatherly	(South Africa) Stuart Marais	(Mauritius) Yannick Lincoln
2018	(South Africa) Alan Hatherly	(South Africa) Stuart Marais	(Namibia) Till Drobisch
2019	(South Africa) Alan Hatherly	(South Africa) Philip Buys	(Namibia) Alex Miller
2022	(Namibia) Alex Miller	(South Africa) Philip Buys	(South Africa) Luke Moir
2023	(South Africa) Philip Buys	(South Africa) Johan van Zyl	(South Africa) Jaedon Terlouw
2024	(South Africa) Alan Hatherly	(Namibia) Alex Miller	(South Africa) Luke Moir
2025	(South Africa) Michael Foster	(South Africa) Johan van Zyl	(South Africa) Massimiliano Ambrosi

=== Under 23 ===
Year	Gold	Silver	Bronze
2009	(South Africa) Burry Stander	(South Africa) Matthys Beukes	(South Africa) Bryce Munro
2011	(South Africa) James Reid	(South Africa) Dominic Calitz	(South Africa) Adriaan Louw
2012	(South Africa) Rourke Croeser	(South Africa) Gert Heyns	(South Africa) James Reid
2013	(South Africa) Brendon Davids	(South Africa) James Reid	(South Africa) Arno du Toit
2014	(South Africa) James Reid	(South Africa) Brendon Davids	(South Africa) Arno du Toit
2016	(South Africa) Alan Hatherly	(South Africa) Marc Fourie	(South Africa) Julian Jessop
2017	(Namibia) Tristan De Lange	(Lesotho) Tumelo Makae	(South Africa) Henry Liebenberg
2018	(South Africa) Jarrod van den Heever	(Namibia) Tristan de Lange	(South Africa) Reinhard Zellhuber
2019	(South Africa) Wessel Botha	(South Africa) Julian Jessop	(South Africa) Henry Liebenberg
2022	(South Africa) Johan van Zyl	(Namibia) Bergran Jensen	(South Africa) Michael Foster
2023	(South Africa) Michael Foster	(South Africa) Daniel van der Walt	(South Africa) Matthew Scott

=== Juniors ===
Year	Gold	Silver	Bronze
2007	(South Africa) Timothy Stark	(Namibia) Jean Hendrik Verdoes	(Namibia) Kim Joerges
2009	(South Africa) James Reid	(South Africa) Adriaan Louw	(South Africa) Shaun Silver
2011	(South Africa) Brendon Davids	(South Africa) Gert Heyns	(South Africa) Luke Roberts
2012	(South Africa) Patrick Belton	(South Africa) Kyle Dorkin	(South Africa) Paul Rodenbach
2013	(South Africa) Dylan Rebello	(Namibia) Martin Freyer	(South Africa) Ivan Venter
2014	(South Africa) Stephan Senekal	(South Africa) Sybrand Strauss	(South Africa) Alan Hatherly
2015	(Namibia) Tristan De Lange	(Namibia) Brandon Plaatjies	(South Africa) Johan Hartzenberg
2016	(Namibia) Herbert Peters	(South Africa) Henry Liebenberg	(South Africa) Wessel Botha
2017	(South Africa) Rossouw Bekker	(South Africa) Pieter Du Toit	(Namibia) Alex Miller
2018	(Namibia) Alex Miller	(South Africa) Keagan Bontekoning	(South Africa) Daniel van der Walt
2019	(South Africa) Daniel van der Walt	(South Africa) Johan van Zyl	(South Africa) Tristan Nortje
2022	(South Africa) Ernest Roets	(Namibia) Daniel Hahn	(South Africa) Massimiliano Ambrosi
2023	(South Africa) Ernest Roets	(South Africa) Massimiliano Ambrosi	(Namibia) Daniel Hahn
2024	(South Africa) Samuel Cleary	(Namibia) Roger Surén	(South Africa) Omar Wilson
2025	(South Africa) Samuel Cleary	(Namibia) Roger Surén	(South Africa) Sean Lowe

== Women's summary ==
=== Elites ===
Year	Gold	Silver	Bronze
2007	(South Africa) Yolande Speedy	(South Africa) Amy Jane Mundy	(South Africa) Tania Raats
2009	(South Africa) Yolande Speedy	(Namibia) Heletje van Staden	(South Africa) Sara Muhl
2011	(South Africa) Yolande Speedy	(South Africa) Samantha Sanders	(South Africa) Yolandi du Toit
2012	(South Africa) Candice Neethling	(Mauritius) Aurélie Halbwachs	(Namibia) Heletje Van Staden
2013	(South Africa) Yolande Speedy	(Mauritius) Aurélie Halbwachs	(South Africa) Samantha Sanders
2014	(South Africa) Mariske Strauss	(South Africa) Samantha Sanders	(South Africa) Cherie Vale
2015	(South Africa) Bianca Haw	(South Africa) Cherie Vale	(Namibia) Michelle Vorster
2016	(South Africa) Mariske Strauss	(South Africa) Cherie Vale	(Namibia) Michelle Vorster
2017	(Namibia) Michelle Vorster	(Mauritius) Aurelie Halbwachs	(Lesotho) Likeleli Masitise
2018	(South Africa) Cherie Redecker	(Kenya) Nancy Akinyi	(Tunisia) Nesrine Ghedira
2019	(South Africa) Mariske Strauss	(South Africa) Cherie Redecker	(South Africa) Candice Lill
2019	(South Africa) Mariske Strauss	(South Africa) Cherie Redecker	(South Africa) Candice Lill
2022	(South Africa) Mariske Strauss	(South Africa) Candice Lill	(Mauritius) Kimberley Le Court de Billot
2023	(South Africa) Candice Lill	(South Africa) Tyler Jacobs	(South Africa) Sarah Hill
2024	(South Africa) Candice Lill	(Mauritius) Aurélie Halbwachs	(Kenya) Monica Kiplagat
2025	(South Africa) Lilian Baber	(South Africa) Aurélie Halbwachs	(South Africa) Carla Kotze

=== Under 23 ===
Year	Gold	Silver	Bronze
2011	(South Africa) Candice Neethling	(South Africa) Mariske Strauss	(South Africa) Caitlin de Wet
2013	(South Africa) Mariske Strauss	(South Africa) Candice Neethling	(Namibia) Vera Adrian
2014	(South Africa) Candice Neethling	(South Africa) Ashley Parker-Moffatt	(South Africa) Hayley Smith
2016	(South Africa) Genevieve Van Coller	(South Africa) Frances Du Toit	(South Africa) Bianca Haw
2017	(Zimbabwe) Skye Davidson		
2018	(Zimbabwe) Stacey Hyslop	(Egypt) Ebtisam Zayed	(Egypt) Donia Rashwan
2019	(Zambia) Anita Yama		
2022	(South Africa) Andrea Schöfmann	(South Africa) Rimari Sutton	(Namibia) Monique du Plessis
2023	(Rwanda) Jazilla Mwamikazi	(South Africa) Anneke van der Walt	(Morocco) Raja Chakir

=== Juniors ===
Year	Gold	Silver	Bronze
2007	(South Africa) Melanie Palframan	(South Africa) Genee Steyn	
2009	(South Africa) Mariske Strauss	(South Africa) Candice Neethling	(South Africa) Caitlin de Wet
2011	(South Africa) Ashley Parker-Moffatt	(Namibia) Vera Adrian	(South Africa) Hayley Smith
2012	(South Africa) Linda Van Wijk	(South Africa) Nicole Erasmus	(South Africa) Tayla Odendaal
2013	(South Africa) Bianca Haw	(South Africa) Marie-Christin Kempf	(South Africa) Marne Botha
2014	(South Africa) Bianca Haw	(South Africa) Frances Du Toit	(Mauritius) Kimberly Le Court de Billot
2015	(Zimbabwe) Skye Davidson	(Zimbabwe) Stacey Hyslop	
2016	(South Africa) Danielle Strydom	(South Africa) Christie Hearder	(South Africa) Allison Morton
2017			
2018	(Algeria) Wissam Bouzegzi	(Morocco) Maroi Rania Alami Marrouni	(Algeria) Yasmine Bouzenzen
2019	(South Africa) Zandri Strydom	(South Africa) Frances Janse van Rensburg	(South Africa) Emma Van Coller
2022	(South Africa) Tyler Jacobs	(South Africa) Ada Kahl	(South Africa) Madison Mann
2023	(South Africa) Lilian Baber	(South Africa) Carla Janse van Vuuren	(South Africa) Carla Kotze
2024	(Namibia) Delsia Janse van Vuuren	(South Africa) Jodi Mackinnon	(Morocco) Imane Lemkhayar
2025	(South Africa) Nadia van Wyk	(South Africa) Lu-Mari du Plessis	(Namibia) Delsia Janse van Vuuren

=== Team Cross-country ===
Year	Gold	Silver	Bronze
2016	Namibia; Michelle Vorster; Costa Seibeb; Herbert Peters; Tristan De Lange	Lesotho; Malefetsane Lesofe; Cabonina Koqo; Likeleli Masitise; Phetetso Monese	Zimbabwe; Skye Davidson; Anthony Greenway; Stacey Hyslop; Jake Greenway
2017			

== Cross-Country Marathon ==
=== Men ===
Year	Gold	Silver	Bronze
2016	(Mauritius) Yannick Lincoln	(Namibia) Costa Seibeb	(Lesotho) Phetetso Monese
2017	(South Africa) Arno du Toit	(Mauritius) Yannick Lincoln	(Morocco) Adil Jelloul

=== Women ===
Year	Gold	Silver	Bronze
2016	(South Africa) Amy McDougall	(South Africa) Ila Gray	
2017	(Mauritius) Aurelie Halbwachs	(Zimbabwe) Skye Davidson	(Mauritius) Pauline Toulet

== Climbing ==
=== Men ===
Year	Gold	Silver	Bronze
2012	(Mauritius) Arnaud Li	(Mauritius) Matthieu Marion	(Mauritius) Jaysan Mohesh
2014	(South Africa) Andrew Neethling	(South Africa) Tiaan Odendaal	(South Africa) Johann Potgieter
2016	(South Africa) Tiaan Odendaal	(South Africa) Stefan Garlicki	(South Africa) Johann Potgieter

=== Women ===
Year	Gold	Silver	Bronze
2014	(South Africa) Hayley-Ann Adamson		
2016	(South Africa) Kim Westbrook		
