= 2010 national road cycling championships =

The 2010 national road cycling championships began in January in Australia and New Zealand. Most of the European national championships take place in June.

== Jerseys ==
The winner of each national championship wears the national jersey in all their races for the next year in the respective discipline, apart from the World Championships, or unless they are wearing a category leader's jersey in a stage race. Most national champion jerseys tend to represent a country's flag or use the colours from it. Jerseys may also feature traditional sporting colours of a country that not derived from a national flag, such as the National colours of Australia on the jerseys of Australian national champions.

== 2010 champions ==
=== Men's Elite ===
Country	Men's Elite Road Race Champion	Champion's Current Team	Men's Elite Time Trial Champion	Champion's Current Team
Albania	Redi Halilaj			
Andorra			David Albós	Agrupació Ciclista Andorrana
Angola	Igor Silva		Igor Silva	
Argentina	Jorge Pi	CC San Juan	Matías Médici	Scott–Marcondes Cesar–São José dos Campos
Antigua and Barbuda	Cosmos Richardson		Robert Marsh	
Aruba	George Winterdal		Gino Hodge	
Australia	Travis Meyer	Garmin–Transitions	Cameron Meyer	Garmin–Transitions
Austria	Harald Starzengruber	Union Raiffeisen Radteam Tirol	Matthias Brändle	Footon–Servetto–Fuji
Bahamas	Lee Farmer			
Barbados	Simon Clarke		Darren Matthews	
Belarus	Aleksandr Kuschynski	Liquigas–Doimo	Branislau Samoilau	Quick-Step
Belgium	Stijn Devolder	Quick-Step	Stijn Devolder	Quick-Step
Belize	Leroy Casasola		Byron Pope	
Benin	Aubierge Soglo		Augustin Amoussouvi	
Bermuda	Geri Mewett		Garth Thomson	
Bolivia	Óscar Soliz	EBSA	Óscar Soliz	EBSA
Brazil	Murilo Fischer	Garmin–Transitions	Luiz Carlos Amorim	Scott–Marcondes Cesar–São José dos Campos
British Virgin Islands	Chris Ghiorse		Darel Christopher Jr.	
Brunei	Muhammad Abd Aziz		Muhammad Abd Aziz	
Bulgaria	Danail Petrov	Madeinox–Boavista	Vladimir Koev	Hemus 1896–Vivelo
Burkina Faso	Abdul Wahab Sawadogo			
Canada	Will Routley	Jelly Belly–Kenda	Svein Tuft	Garmin–Transitions
Cayman Islands	Johan Heath		Steve Abbott	
China	Luis Fernando Sepúlveda		Marco Arriagada	
Colombia	Félix Cárdenas	GW–Shimano	Carlos Ospina	Liga de Antioquia
Costa Rica	Henry Raabe	Citi Economy Blue	José Adrián Bonilla	Citi Economy Blue
Ivory Coast				
Croatia	Radoslav Rogina	Loborika	Matija Kvasina	Zheroquadro–Radenska
Cuba	Raul Granjel		Arnold Alcolea	
Cyprus	Vassilis Adamou			
Czech Republic	Petr Benčik	PSK Whirlpool–Author	František Raboň	Team HTC–Columbia
Denmark	Nicki Sørensen	Team Saxo Bank	Jakob Fuglsang	Team Saxo Bank
Dominican Republic	Deivy Capellan	Mauricio Báez	Augusto Sánchez	Aro & Pedal
Democratic Republic of the Congo	Dukua Bumba			
Ecuador	José Ragonessi		Segundo Navarrete	
El Salvador	Mario Contreras		Mario Contreras	
Estonia	Kalle Kriit	Cofidis	Tanel Kangert	EC St. Etienne-Loire
France	Thomas Voeckler	Bbox Bouygues Telecom	Nicolas Vogondy	Bbox Bouygues Telecom
Finland	Jussi Veikkanen	Française des Jeux	Matti Helminen	
Gabon	Arnaud Ontsassi		Arnaud Ontsassi	
Germany	Christian Knees	Team Milram	Tony Martin	Team HTC–Columbia
Greece	Ioannis Tamouridis	SP Tableware	Ioannis Tamouridis	SP Tableware
Grenada	Sidney Walters		Sidney Walters	
Ghana	Nuru Paddy			
Guatemala	Edgar Hoch		Manuel Rodas	
Guyana	Warren McKay			
Hong Kong	Tang Wang Yip			
Hungary	Péter Kusztor	Atlas Personal	Péter Kusztor	Atlas Personal
Georgia	Giorgi Nadiradze			
Iceland	David Sigurdsson		Gunnlaugur Jonasson	
Iran	Mehdi Sohrabi	Tabriz Petrochemical Cycling Team	Hossein Askari	Tabriz Petrochemical Cycling Team
Ireland	Matthew Brammeier	An Post–Sean Kelly	David McCann	Giant Asia Racing Team
Israel	Niv Libner	Amore & Vita–Conad	Eyal Rahat	
Italy	Giovanni Visconti	ISD–NERI	Marco Pinotti	Team HTC–Columbia
Jamaica	Oniel Samuels		Oniel Samuels	
Japan	Takashi Miyazawa	CDC–Cavaliere	Shinichi Fukushima	Geumsan Ginseng Asia
Kazakhstan	Maxim Gourov	Astana	Andrey Mizurov	Tabriz Petrochemical Cycling Team
Kyrgyzstan	Evgeny Vakker	Giant Asia Racing Team	Evgeny Vakker	Giant Asia Racing Team
Latvia	Aleksejs Saramotins	Team HTC–Columbia	Raivis Belohvoščiks	Ceramica Flaminia
Lebanon				
Libya	Fathi Al Tayeb			
Liechtenstein	Daniel Rinner	Tyrol–Team Radland Tirol	Daniel Rinner	Tyrol–Team Radland Tirol
Lesotho	Phetetso Monese			
Lithuania	Vytautas Kaupas	Continental Team Differdange	Ignatas Konovalovas	Cervélo TestTeam
Luxembourg	Fränk Schleck	Team Saxo Bank	Andy Schleck	Team Saxo Bank
Macedonia	Gorgi Popstefanov	Energi Cycling Macedonia	Joze Jovanov	Elektrika
Malawi	Missi Kathumba			
Malaysia	Muhamad Othman	Drapac–Porsche Cycling		
Malta	Maurice Formosa		Etienne Bonello	
Mauritius	Hugo Caetane		Yannick Lincoln	
Mongolia	Tuguldur Tuulkhangai		Tuguldur Tuulkhangai	
Moldova	Alexandre Pliușchin	Team Katusha	Sergiu Cioban	
Morocco	Mohammed El Ammoury		Mouhssine Lahsaini	
Mexico	Carlos López	Canel's Turbo	Raúl Alcalá	Orsan
Namibia	Joris Harteveld		Jacques Celliers	
Netherlands	Niki Terpstra	Team Milram	Jos van Emden	Rabobank
Netherlands Antilles	Marc de Maar	UnitedHealthcare–Maxxis	Marc de Maar	UnitedHealthcare–Maxxis
Nicaragua	Roger Arteaga			
North Korea				
New Zealand	Jack Bauer	Endura Racing	Gordon McCauley	Genesys Wealth Advisers
Norway	Thor Hushovd	Cervélo TestTeam	Edvald Boasson Hagen	Team Sky
Pakistan	Ali Wazir			
Paraguay	Ruben Armoa		Carlos Carlson	
Peru	Jorge Quispe		John Cunto	
Philippines	Tomas Martinez		Merculio Ramos	
Poland	Jacek Morajko	Mróz Active Jet	Jarosław Marycz	Team Saxo Bank
Portugal	Rui Sousa	Barbot–Siper	Rui Costa	Caisse d'Epargne
Puerto Rico	Juan Martínez Adorno		Jaime Colon	
Romania	Marian Frunzeanu	Dinamo-Scorseze	Dan Anghelache	C.S. Mazicon București
Russia	Alexandr Kolobnev	Team Katusha	Vladimir Gusev	Team Katusha
Rwanda	Adrien Niyonshuti	MTN–Energade		
Saint Lucia	Sammy Joseph		Kurt Maraj	
Saint Kitts and Nevis	Reginald Douglas		Reginald Douglas	
Serbia	Zsolt Dér	Partizan Srbija	Esad Hasanovič	Partizan Srbija
Seychelles	Andy Rose		Andy Rose	
Singapore	Darren Low	Cycleworx	Darren Low	Cycleworx
Slovakia	Jakub Novak	Amore & Vita–Conad	Martin Velits	Team HTC–Columbia
Slovenia	Gorazd Štangelj	Astana	Gregor Gazvoda	RC Arbö–Gourmetfein–Wels
South Africa	Christoff Van Heerden	MTN–Energade	Kevin Evans	MTN–Energade
Spain	José Iván Gutiérrez	Caisse d'Epargne	Luis León Sánchez	Caisse d'Epargne
Suriname	Murwin Arumjo		Moses Rickets	
Sweden	Michael Stevenson	Sparebanken Vest–Ridley	Gustav Larsson	Team Saxo Bank
Switzerland	Martin Elmiger	Ag2r–La Mondiale	Rubens Bertogliati	Androni Giocattoli
Taiwan	Feng Chun Kai	Action Cycling Team		
Tunisia	Rafaâ Chtioui	Acqua & Sapone	Ahmed Mrahihi	
Turkey	Behçet Usta	Brisaspor	Kemal Kucukbay	Brisaspor
Trinidad and Tobago	Ryan Sabga	Black Dog Professional Cycling	Marcus Carvalho	Rafmon Mecalfab
Ukraine	Vitaliy Popkov	ISD Continental Team	Vitaliy Popkov	ISD Continental Team
United Kingdom	Geraint Thomas	Team Sky	Bradley Wiggins	Team Sky
United Arab Emirates	Yousif Banihammad			
Uruguay	Pablo Pintos		Jorge Soto	
United States	Ben King	Trek–Livestrong	Taylor Phinney	Trek–Livestrong
United States Virgin Islands	Glenn Massiah		Juancito Gario	
Uganda	David Matovu			
Uzbekistan	Sergey Lagutin	Vacansoleil	Ruslan Karimov	
Venezuela	José Alirio Contreras		Tomás Gil	
Vietnam	Mai Cong Hieu			
Zambia	Isaac Banda		Yanjanani Sakala	
Zimbabwe	Dave Martin		Dave Martin	

=== Women's ===
Country	Women's Road Race Champion	Women's Time Trial Champion
Argentina	Marcela Zarate	Valeria Müller
Antigua and Barbuda	Linsey Duffy	Tamiko Butler
Australia	Ruth Corset	Amber Halliday
Austria	Andrea Graus	
Bahamas	Linda Holowesko	Amanda Graham
Belarus	Aksana Papko	Aksana Papko
Belgium	Liesbet De Vocht	Grace Verbeke
Bermuda	Sarah Bonnett	Deanna McHullen Thomson
Bolivia	Valeria Escobar	Valeria Escobar
Brazil	Janildes Fernandes Silva	Debora Cristina Gerhard
Canada	Joëlle Numainville	Julie Beveridge
China	Paola Muñoz Grandon	Olga Cisternas
Colombia	Viviana Velasquez	Ana Paola Madriñan Villegas
Costa Rica	Yessenia Villalta	Nataila Navarro
Croatia	Marina Boduljak	Jelena Gracin
Cuba	Yudelmis Domínguez Masague	Dalila Rodríguez Hernandez
Cyprus	Adria Christophorou	
Czech Republic	Martina Sáblíková	Martina Sáblíková
Dominican Republic		Hilda Castillo
Denmark	Annika Langvad	Annika Langvad
El Salvador	Evelyn García	Evelyn García
Estonia	Grete Treier	Grete Treier
France	Mélodie Lesueur	Jeannie Longo
Finland	Carina Ketonen	Anna Lindström
Germany	Charlotte Becker	Judith Arndt
Guatemala		Cindy Morales Aquino
Hong Kong	Sau Yee Ho	
Hungary	Krisztina Fay	Anikó Révész
Ireland	Olivia Dillon	Olivia Dillon
Israel	Inbar Ronen	Yarden Avidan
Italy	Monia Baccaille	Tatiana Guderzo
Japan	Mayuko Hagiwara	Mayuko Hagiwara
Kazakhstan		Natalya Stefanskaya
Latvia		Jelena Dovgaluk
Lithuania	Aušrinė Trebaitė	Kataržina Sosna
Luxembourg	Christine Majerus	Christine Majerus
Malaysia	Mariana Mohammad	
Mexico	Verónica Leal	Verónica Leal
Mongolia	Jamsran Ulziisolongo	Jamsran Ulziisolongo
Namibia	Heletje van Staden	Charmaine Shannon
Netherlands	Loes Gunnewijk	Marianne Vos
Netherlands Antilles	Gerda Fokker	Gerda Fokker
New Zealand	Rushlee Buchanan	Melissa Holt
Norway	Lise Nøstvold	Gunn Hilleren
Poland	Małgorzata Jasińska	Maja Włoszczowska
Portugal	Vanessa Fernandes	Vanessa Fernandes
Puerto Rico	Marie Alexia Rosado Collado	Fabiola Acaron
Russia	Tatiana Antoshina	Tatiana Antoshina
Saint Kitts and Nevis	Kathryn Bertine	Kathryn Bertine
Serbia	Ivana Miucic	Jovana Krtinic
Singapore	Siew Kheng Dinah Chan	
Slovakia	Katarína Uhláriková	Alžbeta Pavlendová
Slovenia	Polona Batagelj	Tjaša Rutar
South Africa	Cherise Taylor	Cashandra Slingerland
Spain	Leire Olaberria Dorronsoro	Leire Olaberria Dorronsoro
Sweden	Emma Johansson	Emilia Fahlin
Switzerland	Emilie Aubry	Pascale Schnider
Turkey	Gül Çelebi	Merve Tayfun Marmara
Ukraine	Nina Ovcharenko	Hanna Solovey
United Kingdom	Emma Pooley	Emma Pooley
United States	Mara Abbott	Evelyn Stevens
Venezuela	Danielys García	Danielys García
Zimbabwe	Linda Rousseau	Linda Davidson

=== Men's Under-23 ===
Country	Men's Under-23 Road Race Champion	Men's Under-23 Time Trial Champion
Argentina	Agustín Fraysse	
Australia	Michael Hepburn	Rohan Dennis
Belarus		
Belgium	Laurens De Vreese	Jonathan Breyne
Bolivia	Wilder Juchani	
Brazil	Tiego Gasparotto Justo	Thiago Duarte Nardin
Canada	Arnaud Paillon	Hugo Houle
China	Gonzalo Andres Gonzalez Vayccettes	Pedro Palma Dos Santos
China		
Colombia	Juan Pablo Valencia	
Costa Rica	Allan Morales	César Rojas
Croatia		Luka Grubic
Cyprus		
Czech Republic		
Denmark	Ricky Enø Jørgensen	Rasmus Christian Quaade
Dominican Republic	José Payano	Marcos Capellan
Ecuador	Carlos Quishpe	
Estonia		Martin Puusepp
Germany	John Degenkolb	Marcel Kittel
Guatemala	Miguel Muñoz	
Hungary	István Molnár	Gábor Fejes
Ireland	Sam Bennett	Aaron Buggle
Italy	Stefano Agostini	Matteo Mammini
Japan	Genki Yamamoto	Yoshiaki Shimada
Kazakhstan		
Luxembourg	Joël Zangerle	
Mexico	Cesar Vaquera	Eder Frayre
Macedonia	Kostadin Petrov	
Netherlands	Tom-Jelte Slagter	Martijn Keizer
New Zealand	Tom Findlay	Michael Vink
Norway	Magnus Børresen	Åge Phan Haugård
Peru	Cristhian Cruz	Jhon Zapana
Poland	Pawel Charucki	
Portugal	Marco Coelho	Nelson Oliveira
Romania	Andrei Nechita	Sipos Zoltan
Russia		Valeri Kaykov
Slovenia	Blaž Furdi	
South Africa	Johann van Zyl	Reinardt Janse van Rensburg
Spain	Albert Torres	Jesus Herrada Lopez
Sweden		
Switzerland	Michael Baer	Silvan Dillier
Turkey	Ahmet Örken	Ahmet Örken
Ukraine	Artem Topchanyuk	
United Kingdom	Andrew Fenn	
Uruguay	Alem Presa	Roderyck Asconeguy
United States	Ben King	Andrew Talansky
Uzbekistan		
Venezuela	Jonathan Monsalve	Carlos Galviz
