= African Men's classification in the Cape Epic =

Absa African Men's Special Jersey
- Sport: Mountain bike
- Competition: Cape Epic
- Awarded for: Men's African best time
- Sponsored by: absa

History
- First award: 2018
- Editions: 7 (as of 2019)
- First winner: Philip Buys (ZAF); Matthys Beukes (ZAF)
- Most wins: Matthys Beukes (ZAF) 5 times
- Most recent: Alan Hatherly (ZAF); Matthew Beers (ZAF)

The African Men's classification is a men's classification, the one by which the best African men's team of the Cape Epic is determined. Since 2018, the leader of the African Men's classification wears the Absa African Men's Special Jersey. Matthys Beukes won the jersey 5 times. Three out of this fives with his partner Philip Buys.

== Winners ==
Year	Team 1st	Winners	Time	GC	Team 2nd	Second place	Time	GC	Team 3rd	Third place	Time	GC
2013	SCOTT Factory Racing -1-	Philip Buys (ZAF) -1- Matthys Beukes (ZAF) -1-	30:47:43,2	6	Cannondale Blend	Darren Lill (ZAF); Charles Keey (ZAF)	31:44:51,4 +57:08,2	9	FedGroup-Itec	Brandon Stewart (ZAF); Neil Macdonald (ZAF)	33:55:03,6 +3:07:20,4	14
2014	SCOTT Factory Racing -2-	Matthys Beukes (ZAF) -2- Gert Heyns (ZAF)	31:42:52,4	6	RECM	Erik Kleinhans (ZAF); Nico Bell (ZAF)	32:05:11,5 +22:19,1	8	RED-E Blend	Andrew Hill (ZAF); Charles Keey (ZAF)	32:59:37,3 +1:26:44,9	11
2015	Scott Factory Racing -3-	Philip Buys (ZAF) -2- Matthys Beukes (ZAF) -3-	32:07:26,0	5	EAI South Africa	Gawie Combrinck (ZAF); Johann Rabie (ZAF)	32:14:49,9 +07:23,9	6	RED-E Blend	Darren Lill (ZAF); Waylon Woolcock (ZAF)	32:15:16,4 +07:50,4	7
2016	USN Purefit	Darren Lill (ZAF); Waylon Woolcock (ZAF)	29:03:22,9	6	NAD Pro MTB	Gawie Combrinck (ZAF); Nico Bell (ZAF)	29:28:26,8 +25:03,9	12	Imbuko-Freewheel Cycology	Christopher Wolhuter (ZAF); Craig Boyes (ZAF)	31:26:00,5 +2:22:37,6	20
2017	PYGA Euro Steel -1-	Philip Buys (ZAF) -3- Matthys Beukes (ZAF) -4-	27:36:12,8	7	NAD Pro MTB	Nico Bell (ZAF); Gawie Combrinck (ZAF)	28:05:11,6 +28:58,2	11	The Gear Change	Justin Tuck (ZAF); David George (ZAF)	29:16:33,7 +1:40:20,9	17
2018	PYGA Euro Steel -2-	Matthys Beukes (ZAF) -5- Julian Jessop (ZAF)	26:54:46,3	12	Ellsworth - ASG	Hendrik Kruger (ZAF); Stuart Marais (ZAF)	27:02:33,5 +1:07:47,2	13	NAD MTB	Nico Bell (ZAF); Matthew Beers (ZAF)	27:07:53,3 +1:13:07,0	15
2019	SpecializedFoundationNAD	Alan Hatherly (ZAF); Matthew Beers (ZAF)	26:47:12,0	5	IMBUKO GIANT	Marco Joubert (ZAF); Nicol Carstens (ZAF)	27:22:23,3 +35:11,3	11	DSV Pro Cycling	Julian Jessop (ZAF); Arno Du Toit (ZAF)	27:36:11,0 +48:59,0	13

== Statistics ==
=== By rider ===
Rank	Rider	Gold	Silver	Bronze	Total
1	Matthys Beukes (ZAF)	5	0	0	5
2	Philip Buys (ZAF)	3	0	0	3
3	Darren Lill (ZAF)	1	1	1	3
4	Julian Jessop (ZAF)	1	0	1	2
4	Matthew Beers (ZAF)	1	0	1	2
4	Waylon Woolcock (ZAF)	1	0	1	2
7	Alan Hatherly (ZAF)	1	0	0	1
7	Gert Heyns (ZAF)	1	0	0	1
Totals (8 entries)		14	1	4	19

=== By duo ===
Rank	Duo	Gold	Silver	Bronze	Total
1	Matthys Beukes (ZAF) Philip Buys (ZAF)	3	0	0	3
2	Darren Lill (ZAF) Waylon Woolcock (ZAF)	1	0	1	2
3	Matthys Beukes (ZAF) Julian Jessop (ZAF)	1	0	0	1
3	Matthys Beukes (ZAF) Gert Heyns (ZAF)	1	0	0	1
Totals (4 entries)		6	0	1	7

=== By nationality ===
Rank	Nation	Gold	Silver	Bronze	Total
1	South Africa (ZAF)	14	14	14	42
Totals (1 entries)		14	14	14	42
