= Bassingthwaighte =

Bassingthwaighte is a surname. Some notable people with this surname include:

- Carmen Bassingthwaighte (born 1986), Namibian professional racing cyclist
- Marc Bassingthwaighte (born 1983), Namibian cyclist
- Natalie Bassingthwaighte (born 1975), Australian recording artist, actress, and television personality
- Michael Bassingthwaighte DSM, Australian army officer who commanded Operation Okra Task Group Taji in the second half of 2019, received Distinguished Service Medal in the 2009 Australia Day Honours
- Sarah Bassingthwaighte, American flautist
