= Gerhard Mans =

Gerhard Mans may refer to:

- Gerhard Mans (cyclist) (born 1987), Namibian cyclist
- Gerhard Mans (rugby union) (1962–2022), Namibian rugby union player
