= Marc Bassingthwaighte =

Namibian cyclist

Personal information
- Born: 21 October 1983 (age 42)

Cycling career
- Sport: Cycling
- Discipline: Cross-country
- Role: Rider
Medal record
Representing Namibia
African Mountain Bike Championships
Silver medal – second place	2012	Men's Elite
Namibian National Mountain Bike Championships
Gold medal – first place	2010	Men's Elite
Namibian National Road Race Championships
Silver medal – second place	2011 Windhoek	Men's Elite
Bronze medal – third place	2012 Windhoek	Men's Elite
Namibian National Time Trial Championships
Bronze medal – third place	2007	Men's Elite

Marc Bassingthwaighte (born 21 October 1983) is a Namibian cyclist who specialises in cross-country events. Bassingthwaighte represented Namibia at the 2012 Summer Olympics in London, where he competed in the men's cross-country. He has also competed in a Commonwealth Games, an African Mountain Bike Championships, a Namibian National Road Race Championships, two Namibian National Time Trial Championships, a Namibian National Mountain Bike Championships and two Giro del Capos. Bassingthwaighte is a two time medalist at the Namibian National Road Race Championships.

== Competition ==
Bassingthwaighte made his debut in international competitions at the 2006 Commonwealth Games. He finished 14th in the men's cross-country in a time of two hours, 26 minutes and 33 seconds. He was over thirteen minutes behind the winner, Englishman Liam Killeen. In 2007, Bassingthwaighte competed in the Namibian National Time Trial Championships. He finished third, behind Jacques Celliers and Dan Craven. Bassingthwaighte then competed in the 2008 Giro del Capo. In the five stage race, Bassingthwaighte's best result came on the second stage, held around Durbanville, where he finished 41st of 121 riders. In 2009, Bassingthwaighte again competed in the Giro del Capo. His best stage result was again on the second stage in Durbanville, where he finished 23rd. Bassingthwaighte won the 2010 Namibian National Mountain Bike Championships. He rode a time of one hour, 59 minutes and 29 seconds, which was eight minutes and nine seconds quicker than second-place finisher Mannie Heymans. At the 2011 Namibian National Road Race Championships, Bassingthwaighte won the silver medal. He finished 31 seconds behind the winner, Lotto Petrus, and two minutes and fifteen seconds ahead of the bronze medalist, Heiko Redecker. In 2012, Bassingthwaighte again gained a medal in the Namibian National Road Race Championships. He finished third behind Petrus and Craven. Also in 2012 at the 2012 African Mountain Bike Championships Bassingthwaighte won a silver medal. He finished three minutes and 44 seconds behind South African Philip Buys. The bronze medalist was Rwandan Adrien Niyonshuti.

=== 2012 Summer Olympics ===
At the 2012 Summer Olympics in London, United Kingdom, Bassingthwaighte competed in the men's cross-country. In the race on 11 August, Bassingthwaighte finished 30th, beating both Buys and Niyonshuti. Bassingthwaighte's time of one hour, 37 minutes and 17 seconds was eight minutes and ten seconds slower than the time of the gold medalist, Jaroslav Kulhavý of the Czech Republic.
