= Namibian National Time Trial Championships =

National road cycling championship in Namibia

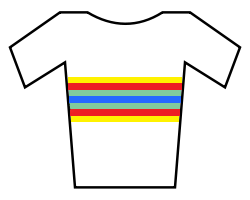
The Champion's Jersey

The Namibian National Time Trial Championship is a cycling race where the Namibian cyclists decide who will become the champion for the year to come. The winners of each event are awarded with a symbolic cycling jersey, just like the national flag, these colors can be worn by the rider at other road racing events in the country to show their status as national champion. The champion's stripes can be combined into a sponsored rider's team kit design for this purpose.

== Men ==
=== Elite ===
Namibian National Time Trial Championships – Men's elite time trial
Race details
- Region: Namibia
- Discipline: Road bicycle racing
- Type: One-day

History
- First edition: 2007
- First winner: Jacques Celliers
- Most wins: Till Drobisch; Drikus Coetzee (5 wins)
- Most recent: Drikus Coetzee

Year	Gold	Silver	Bronze
2007	Jacques Celliers	Dan Craven	Marc Bassingthwaighte
2008	Jacques Celliers	Heinrich Köhne	Josh Nakapipi
2009	Erik Hoffmann	Jacques Celliers	Heinrich Köhne
2010	Jacques Celliers	Joris Michael Harteveld	Jacobus Van Zyl
2011	Lotto Petrus	Victor Krohne	Frank Adrian
2012	Lotto Petrus	Dan Craven	Jacques Celliers
2013	Till Drobisch	Gerhard Mans	Raul Costa Seibeb
2014	Till Drobisch	Raul Costa Seibeb	Norbert Meyer
2015	Gerhard Mans	Raul Costa Seibeb	Martin Freyer
2016	Till Drobisch	Dan Craven	Gerhard Mans
2017	Till Drobisch	Raul Costa Seibeb	Drikus Coetzee
2018	Drikus Coetzee	Martin Freyer	André de Klerk
2019	Drikus Coetzee	André de Klerk	Xavier Papo
2020	Drikus Coetzee	Eiseb Masckernzy	Hardus Nel
2021	Drikus Coetzee	Horst Neumann	Eiseb Masckernzy
2022	Jean-Paul Burger	Drikus Coetzee	Heiko Diehl
2023	Drikus Coetzee	Jean-Paul Burger	Hardus Nel

== Women ==
=== Elite ===
Namibian National Road Race Championships – Women's time trial
Race details
- Region: Namibia
- Discipline: Road bicycle racing
- Type: One-day

History
- First edition: 2007
- First winner: Chermaine Shannon
- Most wins: Vera Looser (7 wins)
- Most recent: Melissa Hinz

Year	Gold	Silver	Bronze
2007	Charmaine Shannon		
2009	Charmaine Shannon	Susan Horn	Lorraine Stofberg
2010	Charmaine Shannon		
2011	Hayley Brand	Charmaine Shannon	
2012	Vera Looser	Heletje Van Staden	Hayley Brand
2013	Irene Steyn	Wanette Hanekom	Hayley Brand
2014	Irene Steyn	Vera Looser	Heletje Van Staden
2015	Vera Looser	Michelle Vorster	Irene Steyn
2016	Vera Looser		
2017	Vera Looser	Irene Steyn	
2018	Irene Steyn	Vera Looser	
2019	Vera Looser	Michelle Vorster	Irene Steyn
2020	Melissa Hinz		
2021	Vera Looser	Risa Dreyer	Courtney Liebenberg
2022	Vera Looser	Melissa Hinz	Anri Krugel
2023	Melissa Hinz	Anri Krugel	Vera Looser

== See also ==
- Namibian National Road Race Championships
- National road cycling championships
