= Waylon Woolcock =

South African mountain biker

Personal information
- Full name: Waylon Woolcock
- Nickname: Way
- Born: 8 July 1982 (age 44) Middelburg, South Africa
- Height: 1.75 m (5 ft 9 in)
- Weight: 65 kg (143 lb)

Cycling career
- Sport: Cycling
- Current team: USN Purefit
- Discipline: MTB
- Role: Rider

Amateur teams
- 2001: Omega
- 2002-2003: Minolta
- 2004-2005: Tuks Aerosud
- 2006: Microsoft

Professional teams
- 2007-2008: MTN
- 2009-2010: Medscheme
- 2011-2012: Bonitas
- 2011-2013: RE:CM
- 2014: Cannondale Blend
- 2015: Blend Red-E

Major wins
- Tour d'Egypte; JoBerg2c; MTN Crater Cruise; Cape Pioneer Trek; Sani2c

Waylon Woolcock (born 8 July 1982 in Middelburg) is a South African professional mountain biker, riding for Team RE:CM Woolcock started cycling as a road rider at the age of 15 and turned professional at the age of 19. In 2007, he won his first major cycling tour, Tour d'Egypte. In 2008 he finished second in the South African National Road Race Championship. In 2011 to 2013, Woolcock took to mountain biking and in those years he won the JoBerg2c mountain bike stage race once and 2nd twice including nine stage wins in total. Woolcock's latest achievements are the MTN Crater Cruise Ultra Marathon and Cape Pioneer Trek stage race.

== Achievements ==
2003
National Team Representation

Under-23 Tour of Berlin, Germany

2004
National Team Representation

Under-23 Tour of Berlin, Germany
Under-23 Turingen Rundfahrt, Germany
Under-23 World Championships, Italy

2005
National Team Representation

Tour d'Egypte
Tour of Qinghai Lakes, China
Tour of Senegal

2007
1st stage 3 Tour du Maroc
1st Jock Cycle Classique
Tour d'Egypte

1st overall general classification
1st stage 3

National Team Representation

Tour d'Egypte
Tour of Hainan, China

2008
2nd SA National Road Race Championships
1st Tour of Soweto
National team representation

Tour de Langkawi

2011
Sani2c

2nd overall general classification
1st stage 3

JoBerg2c

1st overall general classification
1st stages 2,3,5,6,7 & 8

2012
JoBerg2c

2nd overall general classification
1st stages 5 & 9

2013
JoBerg2c

2nd overall general classification
1st stage 3
1st MTN Crater Cruise

Cape Pioneer Trek

1st overall general classification
