= Cycling at the 2018 Commonwealth Games – Women's cross-country =

Cycling – Women's cross-country at the 2018 Commonwealth Games
- Venue: Nerang National Park
- Dates: 12 April
- Competitors: 13 from 10 nations
- Winning time: 1:18:02

Medalists
gold medal	Annie Last	England
silver medal	Evie Richards	England
bronze medal	Haley Smith	Canada

The women's cross country mountain biking competition at the 2018 Commonwealth Games in Gold Coast, Australia was held on 12 April in the Nerang National Park.

== Schedule ==
The schedule was as follows:

Date	Time	Round
Thursday 12 April 2018	10:31	Race

All times are Australian Eastern Standard Time (UTC+10)

== Results ==
The results were as follows:

Rank	Name	Time	Behind
1st place, gold medalist(s)	Annie Last (ENG)	1:18:02	–
2nd place, silver medalist(s)	Evie Richards (ENG)	1:18:50	+0:48
3rd place, bronze medalist(s)	Haley Smith (CAN)	1:20:26	+2:24
4	Emily Batty (CAN)	1:21:02	+3:00
5	Isla Short (SCO)	1:21:34	+3:32
6	Rebecca McConnell (AUS)	1:22:32	+4:30
7	Mariske Strauss (RSA)	1:22:50	+4:48
8	Michelle Vorster (NAM)	1:23:37	+5:35
9	Samara Sheppard (NZL)	1:23:46	+5:44
10	Antri Christoforou (CYP)	-1LAP	–
11	Cherie Redecker (RSA)	-1LAP	–
12	Likeleli Masitise (LES)	-4LAP	–
–	Flora Duffy (BER)	DNS	–
