= Irene Steyn =

Namibian cyclist

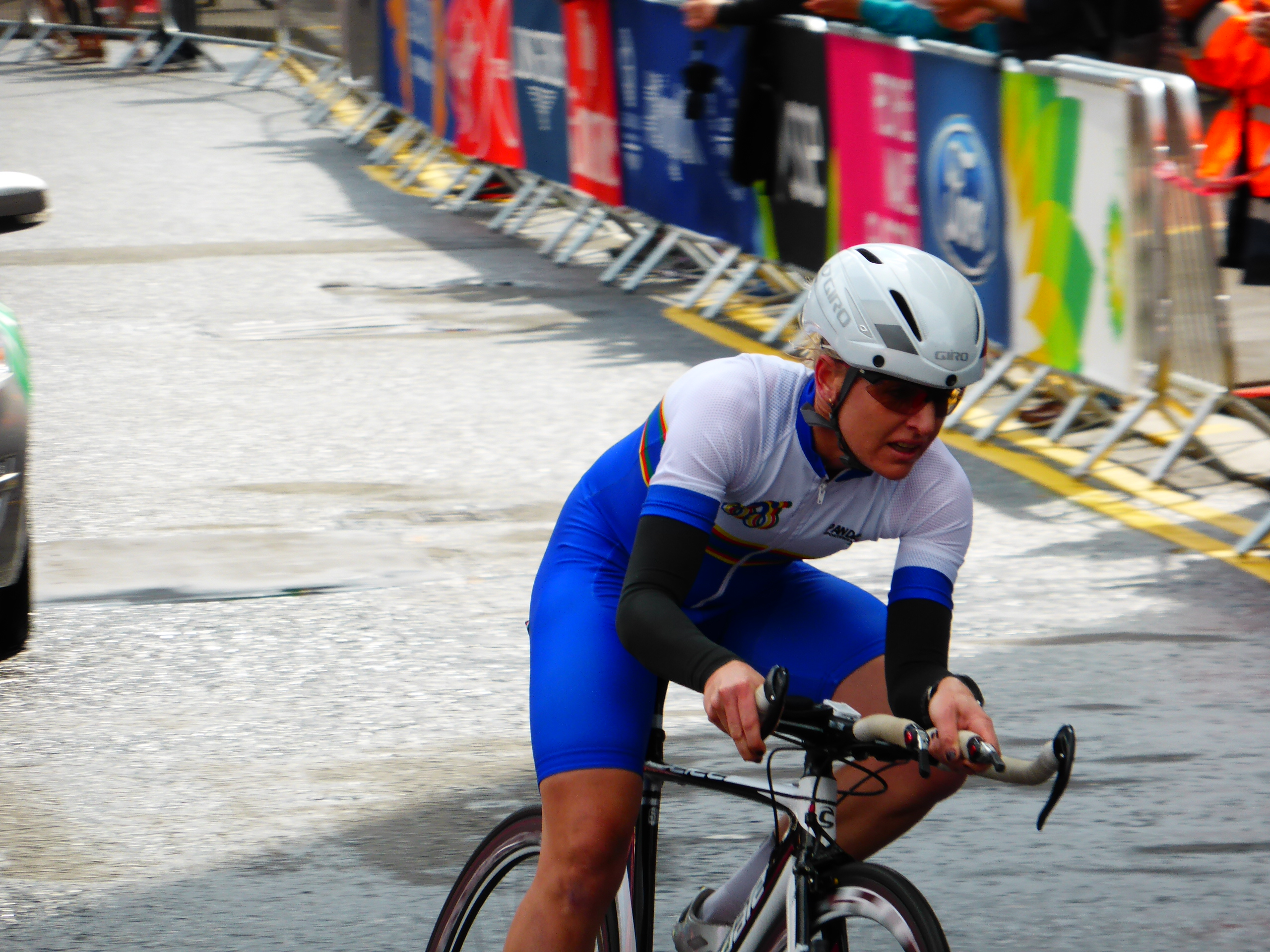
- Steyn at the 2014 Commonwealth Games

Personal information
- Full name: Irene Steyn
- Born: 6 July 1977 (age 49)

Cycling career
- Sport: Cycling
- Discipline: Road
- Role: Rider

Irene Steyn (born 6 July 1977) is a Namibian racing cyclist. In 2013, she won both the Namibian National Road Race Championships, and the Namibian National Time Trial Championships.

== Major results ==
2013
National Road Championships

1st Road race
1st Time trial

2014
National Road Championships

1st Time trial
3rd Road race

2015
2nd Team time trial, African Road Championships
National Road Championships

3rd Road race
3rd Time trial

4th 947 Cycle Challenge
2017
National Road Championships

2nd Time trial
3rd Road race

2018
1st Time trial, National Road Championships
2019
National Road Championships

3rd Road race
3rd Time trial

2020
2nd Road race, National Road Championships
