= Matthew Beers =

South African cyclist

Personal information
- Born: 10 January 1994 (age 32)

Cycling career
- Sport: Cycling
- Disciplines: Cross-country; Road; Gravel
- Role: Rider

Amateur team
- 2018–2019: Nad Professional

Professional teams
- 2019: UAE Team Emirates (stagiaire)
- 2023: Toyota Specialized

Matthew Beers (born 10 January 1994) is a South African cyclist who specializes in cross-country mountain biking and gravel racing. He has also won the Cape Epic four times, in 2021, 2023, 2024 and 2026. He has won multiple national titles in South Africa including the cross-country marathon and the gravel race.

== Major results ==
=== Mountain bike ===
2018
1st Sani2C (with Nico Bell)
2nd Cross-country, National Championships
2019
1st African classification, Cape Epic (with Alan Hatherly)
2020
1st Attakwas Extreme
2nd Cross-country, National Championships
2021
1st Marathon, National Championships
1st Overall Cape Epic (with Jordan Sarrou)

1st Prologue & Stage 2

SA XCO Cup Series

1st Cape Town
1st Gauteng
2nd Bloemfontein

1st Western Cape
2022
2nd Overall Tankwa Trek (with Tristan Nortjie)
2nd Marathon, National Championships

1st Stage 3

3rd Overall Cape Epic (with Christopher Blevins)
3rd Attakwas Extreme
3rd SA XCO Cup Series #1
3rd SA XCO Cup Series #2
2023
1st Marathon, National Championships
1st Overall Cape Epic (with Christopher Blevins)

1st Prologue & Stages 2, 3, 4 & 6

1st Sani2C (with Tristan Nortjie)

1st Stage 2

1st Overall Tankwa Trek (with Tristan Nortjie)

1st Stage 2

1st Attakwas Extreme
2nd Little Sugar MTB (US)
2024
1st Overall Tankwa Trek (with Alex Miller)
2nd Attakwas Extreme
1st songo.info Champions race
1st Overall Cape Epic (with Howard Grotts)

1st Stages 5 & 6

3rd Life Time Sea Otter Classic
2nd Little Sugar MTB (US)
1st Overall Wines2Whales (with Alex Miller)

1st Stages 1, 2 & 35

2026
1st Trailseeker - Banhoek
1st Overall Cape Epic (with Tristan Nortje)

1st Prologue

=== Gravel ===
2022
2nd Belgian Waffle Ride California (US)
2nd Rule of Three Texas (US)
2023
1st National Championships
1st Truckee Tahoe Gravel California (US)
3rd Crusher in the Tusher (US)
2024
1st Belgian Waffle Ride California (US)
1st Around the Pot 100M Swellendam
1st Race to the Sea Franschhoek/Hermanus
2025
2nd Sea Otter Classic California (US)
1st Belgian Waffle Ride California (US)
2nd The Traka 200 (Spain)
1st Around the Pot 100M Swellendam
1st Lauf Gravel Worlds Championships 150M Nebraska (US)
REBECCA’S PRIVATE IDAHO (US), 1st overall and 1st stages 1, 2 & 3
1st Big Sugar Classic

Nedbank Gravel Burn, 1st GC and 1st stages 1, 2, 4
2026
1st Filthy Fondo
3rd Santa Vall
5th Sea Otter California
3rd The Traka 360
2nd Unbound, Kansas
1st Around the Pot
1st Road to Desolation
Nedbank Gravel Burn, 1st GC

=== Road ===
2018
1st Overall Mpumalanga Tour
2019
1st Overall Mpumalanga Tour
2021
2nd Time trial, National Road Championships
