= Tristan de Lange =

Namibian cyclist (born 1997)

Personal information
- Born: 15 June 1997 (age 29)
- Height: 1.75 m (5 ft 9 in)
- Weight: 68 kg (150 lb)

Cycling career
- Sport: Cycling
- Disciplines: Road; Mountain biking
- Role: Rider

Amateur team
- 2018: Namibian CF

Professional team
- 2020: MBM Racing

Tristan de Lange (born 15 June 1997) is a Namibian road cyclist and mountain biker. He qualified for the road race at the 2020 Summer Olympics, having to act as a replacement for Dan Craven after he tested positive for COVID-19. De Lange won the Namibian Desert Dash mountain bike race in 2021.

== Major results ==
=== Road ===
2015
National Junior Road Championships

1st Road race
1st Time trial

3rd Team time trial, African Junior Road Championships
2020
2nd Road race, National Road Championships
2021
2nd Road race, National Road Championships
2nd Overall Tour de Windhoek

1st Stage 3

2023
1st Road race, National Road Championships

=== Mountain bike ===
2014
1st National Junior XCO Championships
2015
1st African Junior XCO Championships
1st National Junior XCO Championships
2016
1st Team relay, African Championships
1st National Under-23 XCO Championships
2017
1st African Under-23 XCO Championships
2018
1st National XCO Championships
1st National XCM Championships
2nd African Under-23 XCO Championships
2019
African Games

1st Cross-country
1st Cross-country marathon

2021
1st Desert Dash Namibia (11 December 2021)
