= Athletics at the 2018 Commonwealth Games – Women's marathon =

Women's marathon at the 2018 Commonwealth Games
- Venue: Southport Broadwater Parklands
- Dates: 15 April 2018
- Competitors: 17 from 9 nations
- Winning time: 2:32:40

Medalists
gold medal	Helalia Johannes	Namibia
silver medal	Lisa Weightman	Australia
bronze medal	Jessica Trengove	Australia

The women's marathon at the 2018 Commonwealth Games, as part of the athletics programme, was held in Southport Broadwater Parklands, Gold Coast on 15 April 2018.

== Records ==
Prior to this competition, the existing world and Games records were as follows:

World record	Paula Radcliffe (GBR)	2:15:25 (mixed gender)	London, United Kingdom	13 April 2003
World record	Mary Keitany (KEN)	2:17:01 (women only)	London, United Kingdom	23 April 2017
Games record	Lisa Martin (AUS)	2:25:28	Auckland, New Zealand	31 January 1990

== Schedule ==
The schedule was as follows:

Date	Time	Round
Sunday 15 April 2018	7:20	Race

All times are Australian Eastern Standard Time (UTC+10)

== Results ==
The results were as follows:

Rank	Athlete	Time	Notes
1st place, gold medalist(s)	Helalia Johannes (NAM)	2:32:40	
2nd place, silver medalist(s)	Lisa Weightman (AUS)	2:33:23	
3rd place, bronze medalist(s)	Jessica Trengove (AUS)	2:34:09	
4	Sheila Jerotich (KEN)	2:36:19	
5	Sonia Samuels (ENG)	2:36:59	
6	Alyson Dixon (ENG)	2:38:19	
7	Lavinia Haitope (NAM)	2:40:54	
8	Caryl Jones (WAL)	2:43:58	
9	Sara Ramadhani (TAN)	2:46:52	
10	Shelmith Nyawira (KEN)	2:47:53	SB
11	Hiruni Wijayaratne (SRI)	2:49:38	
12	Leena Ekandjo (NAM)	2:50:59	
13	Neheng Khatala (LES)	2:51:04	R 240.8h
14	Tonya Nero (TTO)	2:55:14	
15	Elinor Kirk (WAL)	2:57:01	
16	Virginia Moloney (AUS)	2:58:54	
−	Hellen Musyoka (KEN)	DNF	
