= Lisa Jane Weightman =

Australian long-distance runner

Lisa Weightman
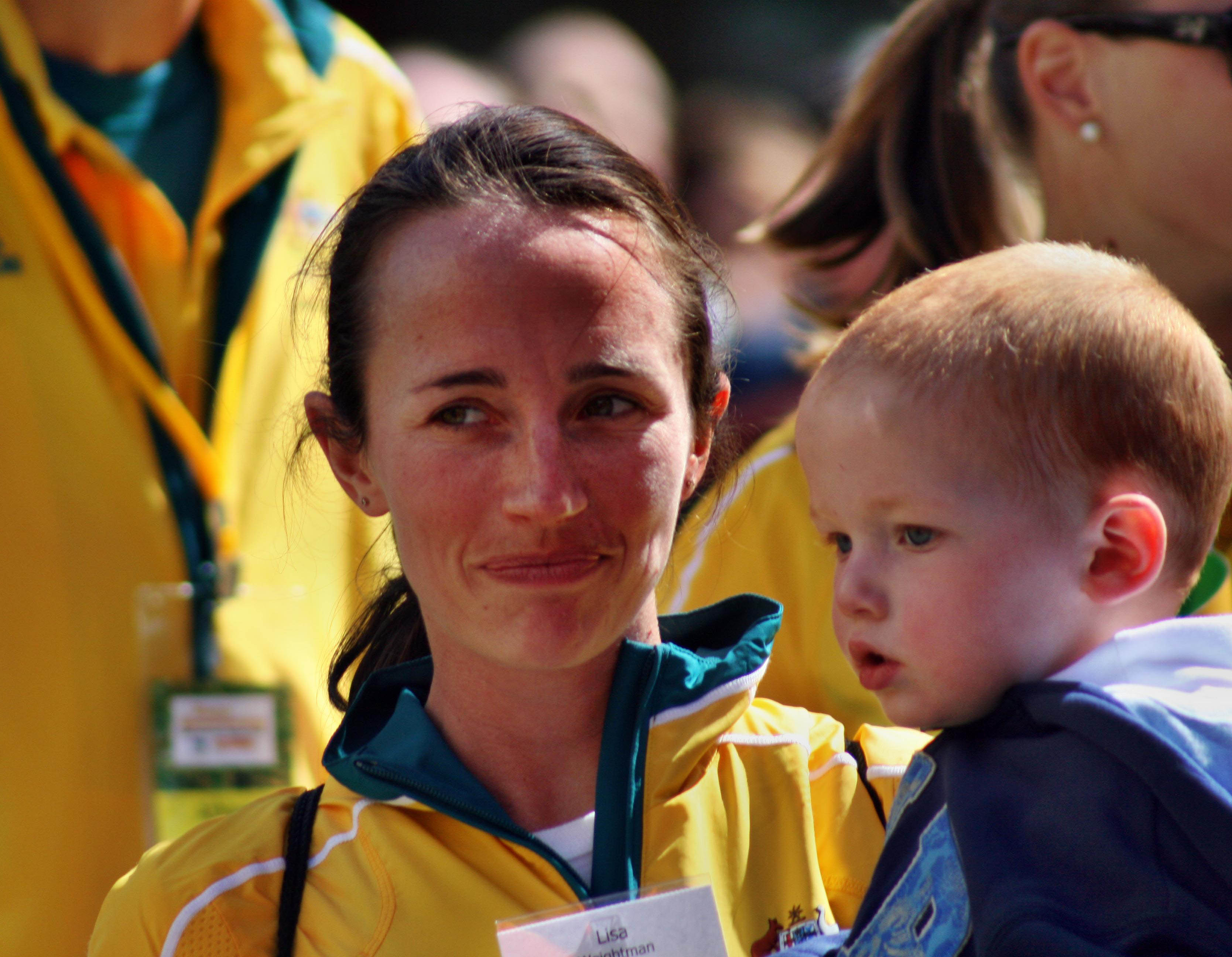
- Weightman with her nephew in Melbourne for the 2008 Olympic homecoming parade

Personal information
- Full name: Lisa Jane Weightman
- Born: 16 January 1979 (age 47) Melbourne, Australia
- Height: 1.57 m (5 ft 2 in)
- Weight: 44 kg (97 lb)

Sport
- Country: Australia
- Sport: Athletics
- Event: Marathon
- Coached by: Richard Telford
Medal record
Representing Australia
Commonwealth Games
Bronze medal – third place	2010 Delhi	Marathon
Silver medal – second place	2018 Gold Coast	Marathon
IAAF World Cross Country Championships
Bronze medal – third place	2008 Edinburgh	Team

Lisa Jane Weightman (born 16 January 1979) is an Australian long-distance runner and four time Olympian who specializes in the marathon event. At the 2020 Tokyo Olympics she came 26th in the Women's marathon with a time of 2:34.19, 7 minutes behind the eventual winner, Peres Jepchirchir.

Weightman represented Australia in the marathon at the 2008 Summer Olympics, the 2012 Summer Olympics and the 2009 World Championships in Athletics. She won her first marathon race in 2010, setting a personal best time of 2:28:48 at the Nagano Olympic Commemorative Marathon.

She has also competed at the IAAF World Road Running Championships and the IAAF World Cross Country Championships, winning a team bronze in the latter competition in 2008.

== Career ==
Weightman started out as a track runner but had her first success in cross country running, winning the under-23 section of the national championships in 2003. She took part in the Chiba Ekiden road relay competition the following year and finished ninth. In 2006, she became a double national champion when she topped the podium in the 10,000 metres and half marathon events, and she returned to the Chiba Ekiden to improve to fourth place in her stage.

Her first international championships appearance was at the 2006 IAAF World Road Running Championships where she placed thirty-seventh overall. Weightman ended the year by finishing second in the 10,000 metres at the Zatopek Classic behind New Zealander Jessica Ruthe. (Zatopek is named after the Czech distance running great Emil Zatopek and was first held in 1961. It is one of the most prestigious track races on Australian soil). Weightman represented Australia twice in 2007: taking forty-second place at the 2007 IAAF World Cross Country Championships and thirty-third at the 2007 IAAF World Road Running Championships.

Weightman won a world championship medal at the 2008 IAAF World Cross Country Championships and she and Benita Johnson helped lead the Australian women to the team bronze. She made her marathon debut soon afterwards, finishing thirteenth in the women's race with a time of 2:32:32. This performance gained her selection for the women's marathon race at the 2008 Summer Olympics, where she finished thirty-third with a time of 2:34:16, the second best Australian performance after Johnson.

Weightman improved her best world cross country performance at the 2009 IAAF World Cross Country Championships, finishing seventeenth and heading the Australian team to seventh place in the rankings. At the 2009 Christchurch Half Marathon, she was the first past the post to record her first major win on the road running circuit. She competed at her first World Championships in Athletics later that season as Australia's only participant in the women's marathon; she placed eighteenth overall and set a new personal best over the distance with a time of 2:30:42.

She improved further in the marathon at the start of the following year, dominating the Nagano Olympic Commemorative Marathon from the 15 km mark to the finish. She knocked almost two minutes off her previous best time to win in 2:28:48, making her the first Australian to win the race. She was selected for the event at the 2010 Commonwealth Games in New Delhi. She fell away from the leading pack on two occasions but managed to make up the deficit both times and won the bronze medal in a time of 2:35.25, although she had to be taken from the finish line in a wheelchair due to her exhaustion. She won the 10 km run of the Gold Coast Marathon-event on 1 July 2012 in Gold Coast, Queensland, Australia finishing in front of Emma Moffatt. At the 2012 Summer Olympics, she finished in 17th place. She came 31st in the marathon at the 2016 Rio Olympics in 2:34:41 and 26th in the marathon at the 2020 Tokyo Olympics. She achieved a PB of 2:24:00 and came 15th at the 2022 Berlin Marathon.

== Personal life ==
Outside of competitive running, Weightman is a business consultant for IBM and she was the recipient of the 2000 Award for Business Excellence from The Age. She is the daughter of former footballer Peter Weightman and married her training partner, Lachlan McArthur, in 2008.

== Personal bests ==
Event	Time (h:m:s)	Venue	Date
10 kilometres	31:50	Melbourne, Australia	28 February 2021
20 kilometres	1:10:51	Debrecen, Hungary	8 October 2006
Half marathon	1:08:48	Sunshine Coast, Australia	4 August 2019
Marathon	2:23:15	Osaka, Japan	26 February 2023

- All information taken from World Athletics profile.

== Competition record ==
Year	Competition	Venue	Position	Event	
2006	World Road Running Championships	Debrecen, Hungary	37th	20 kilometres	
2007	World Cross Country Championships	Mombasa, Kenya	42nd	Senior race	
2007	World Road Running Championships	Udine, Italy	33rd	Half marathon	
2008	World Cross Country Championships	Edinburgh, Scotland	20th	Senior individual	
2008	World Cross Country Championships	Edinburgh, Scotland	3rd	Senior team	
2008	Olympic Games	Beijing, China	33rd	Marathon	
2009	World Cross Country Championships	Amman, Jordan	17th	Senior individual	
2009	World Cross Country Championships	Amman, Jordan	7th	Senior team	
2009	World Championships in Athletics	Berlin, Germany	18th	Marathon	
2010	Nagano Marathon	Nagano, Japan	1st	Marathon	2:28:48
2012	Olympic Games	London, United Kingdom	17th	Marathon	2:27:32
2016	Olympic Games	Rio de Janeiro, Brazil	17th	Marathon	2:34:41
2018	Commonwealth Games	Gold Coast, Australia	2nd	Marathon	2:33:23
2021	Olympic Games	Sapporo, Japan	26th	Marathon	2:34:19
2022	Berlin Marathon	Berlin, Germany	15th	Marathon	2:24:00
2023	World Championships	Budapest, Hungary	16th	Marathon	2:30:50

=== Road race wins ===
- Christchurch Half Marathon: 2009
- Nagano Olympic Commemorative Marathon: 2010
- Melbourne Marathon: 2013
