= Jessica Stenson =

Australian long-distance runner

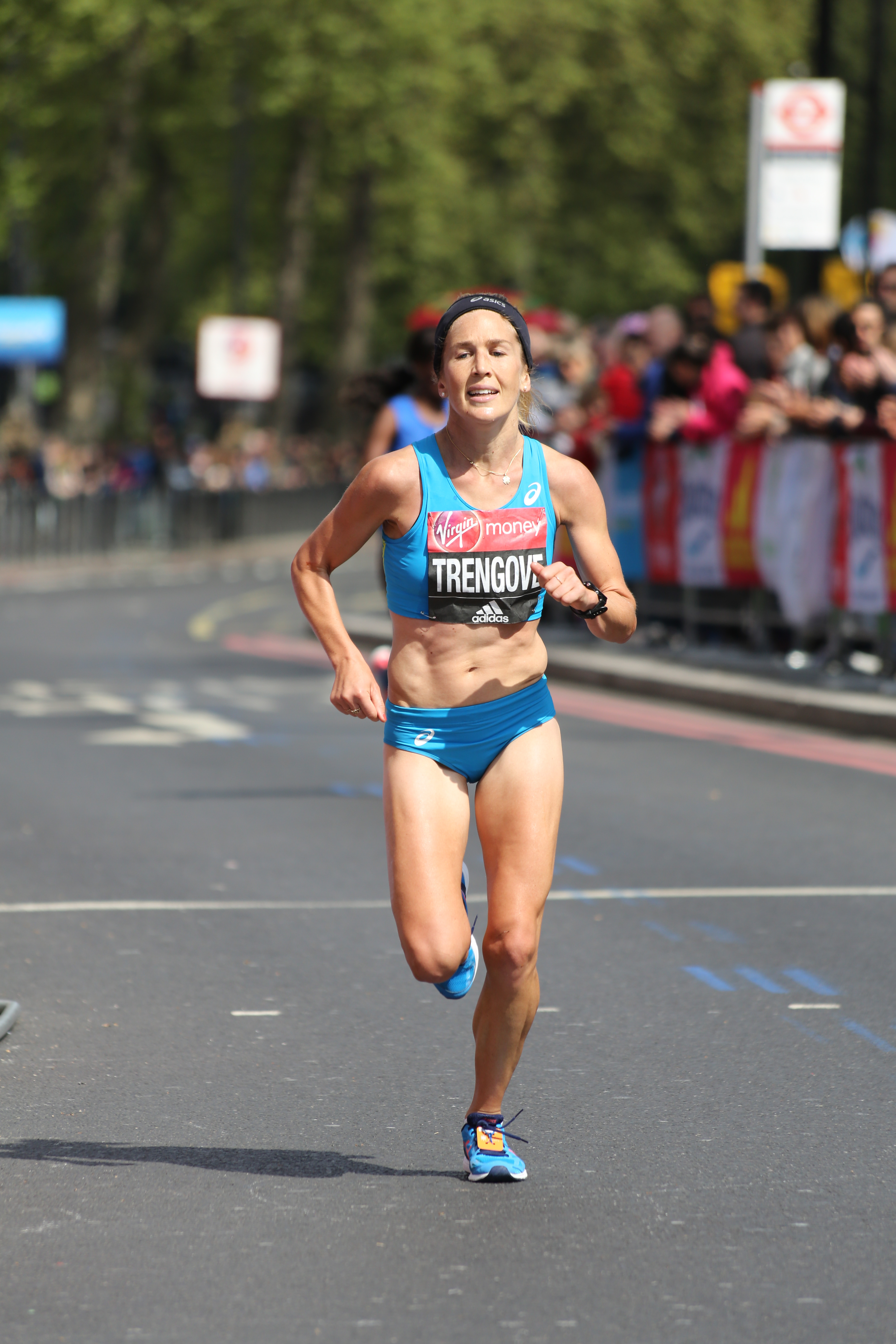
- Trengove at the 2017 London Marathon

Personal information
- Nickname: Jess
- Nationality: Australian
- Born: Jessica Trengove; 15 August 1987 (age 38) Naracoorte, South Australia
- Height: 1.66 m (5 ft 5 in) (2012)
- Weight: 52 kg (115 lb) (2012)

Sport
- Country: Australia
- Sport: Athletics
- Events: 1500 metres 5000 metres 10,000 metres Half marathon Marathon
Medal record
Women's athletics
Representing Australia
Commonwealth Games
Gold medal – first place	2022 Birmingham	Marathon
Bronze medal – third place	2014 Glasgow	Marathon
Bronze medal – third place	2018 Gold Coast	Marathon

Jessica Stenson (née Trengove; born 15 August 1987) is an Australian athlete who won the gold medal in the Marathon at the 2022 Commonwealth Games in Birmingham and currently holds the Australian Marathon Record of 2:21:24. As a long-distance runner, she competes in distances from 5000 metres up to the Marathon. She has represented Australia at 3 Olympic games, 2012 London Olympics, 2016 Rio de Janeiro Olympics, 2024 Paris Olympics in the Marathon.

== Background ==
Jess Stenson was born on 15 August 1987 in Naracoorte, South Australia. She attended Naracoorte Primary School before going to Naracoorte High School and boarding school at Annesley College, having moved to Adelaide to attend the school at the start of year 10. She attended the University of South Australia from 2006 to 2009 where she earned a Bachelor of Physiotherapy. She played netball for Contax in 2008. She also played basketball, competing in the South Australia 12–19 State Country U18s. As of 2012, she lives in Adelaide with her husband and two children. Her brother is former Melbourne Football Club player Jack Trengove, and has been influential in her running career by creating a sense of competition in her family.

Stenson is an ambassador for The Little Heroes Foundation, Jodi Lee Foundation and lululemon.

Stenson is 166 centimetres (65 in) tall and weighs 55 kilograms (121 lb).

== Athletics ==
Stenson's running career started when she was in primary school, where she ran south east cross country. In 2000, she was selected for the South Australia representative cross country team. As of 2008, she was coached by Adam Didyk, prior to that was coached by Roger Pedrick.

Stenson competed in the City to Bay Run in 2010, finishing first. That year, she also competed at the Nanning, China hosted World Half Marathon Championships. She ran her first marathon in March 2012, where she set an Olympic A qualifying time of 2 hours, 31 minutes. In 2012, her training regime included running up to 160 kilometres (99 mi) a week. On her light training days, she ran 12 kilometres (7.5 mi). Trengove was selected to represent Australia at the 2012 Summer Olympics in the women's marathon. She was the third South Australian athletics competitor to qualify for the Games, and prepared for them by training in Adelaide. She finished the Olympic marathon in 39th place with a time of 2:31:17, 8 minutes and 10 seconds behind the first-place finisher Tiki Gelana. At the 2014 Commonwealth Games, she won the bronze medal, running a then personal best of 2:30:12. She came 13th in the same event at the 2024 Paris Olympics in a time of 2:26:45. She finished ninth in the 2017 IAAF World Championships marathon in a time of 2:28:59. This was the best performance by an Australian woman in a World Championship Marathon.

=== Personal bests ===
As of April 2026, her personal best times are:

- 1,500 metres: 4:26.9, Adelaide, 2013.
- 5,000 metres: 15:35, Adelaide, November 2016.
- 10,000 metres: 32:17, Stanford, April 2015.
- half marathon: 69:04, Melbourne, October 2024.
- marathon: 2:21:24, Valencia, 7 December 2025.

=== Results ===
Her results include:

- 8th, 2:21:24 [AUS National record], Valencia Marathon, Dec 7 2025
- Gold Medal [1st, 2:27:31], 2022 Birmingham Commonwealth Games Marathon
- 13th, 2:26:45, 2024 Paris Olympics, August 11, 2024
- 1st, 2:27:45, 2015 Melbourne Marathon
- 24th, 1:14:21, IAAF / SINOPEC World Half Marathon Championships, Nanning, 16 October 2010
- 14th, Nagoya International Women's Marathon, Nagoya, 11 March 2012
- 71st, IAAF World Cross Country Championships, Punta Umbría, 20 March 2011
- Winner, 2011 City2Surf, Sydney, 2011

== Recognition ==
- 2016 - People's Choice Award at the Advertiser/Channel 7 Sport Star of the Year awards.
- October 2022 - Awarded the Australian Sports Medal for her achievements at the Commonwealth Games.
- 2022 - Australian Institute of Sport Female Athlete of The Year
