= Cordula Möller =

Namibian cyclist

Personal information
- Born: 21 June 1968 (age 58) Stuttgart, West Germany

Cycling career
- Sport: Cycling
- Role: Rider

Cordula Möller (born 21 June 1968) is a Namibian professional racing cyclist. In 2008, she won the Namibian National Road Race Championships.
