= Samara Sheppard =

New Zealand cyclist

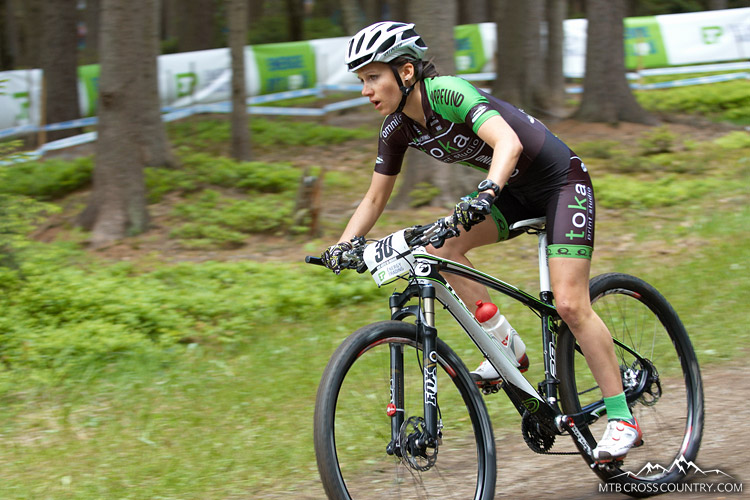
- Samara Sheppard at UCI World Cup XCO/XCE 2, Nove Mesto na Morave, 2013

Personal information
- Born: 25 June 1990 (age 36) New Zealand

Cycling career
- Sport: Cycling
- Discipline: Road
- Role: Rider

Professional team
- 2014–2015: Bizkaia–Durango

Samara Sheppard (born 1990) is a mountain bike racing and road bicycle racing cyclist from New Zealand. She competed for New Zealand at the 2018 Commonwealth Games on the Gold Coast, finishing ninth out of twelve competitors in the women's cross-country competition.

== Life ==
Sheppard was born in Clyde in the South Island of New Zealand. She suffered a series of injuries as a runner which led her to move into cycling as an alternative sport. She relocated to Australia in 2016 and won a New Zealand title in 2017 and Oceania titles in 2017 and 2018. She also won an Australian title, the elite women's section of the Australian Mountain Bike National Series, in 2018.

== Major results ==
=== Road ===
2020
2nd Gravel and Tar
9th Overall Women's Herald Sun Tour
