= Haley Smith =

Canadian cyclist

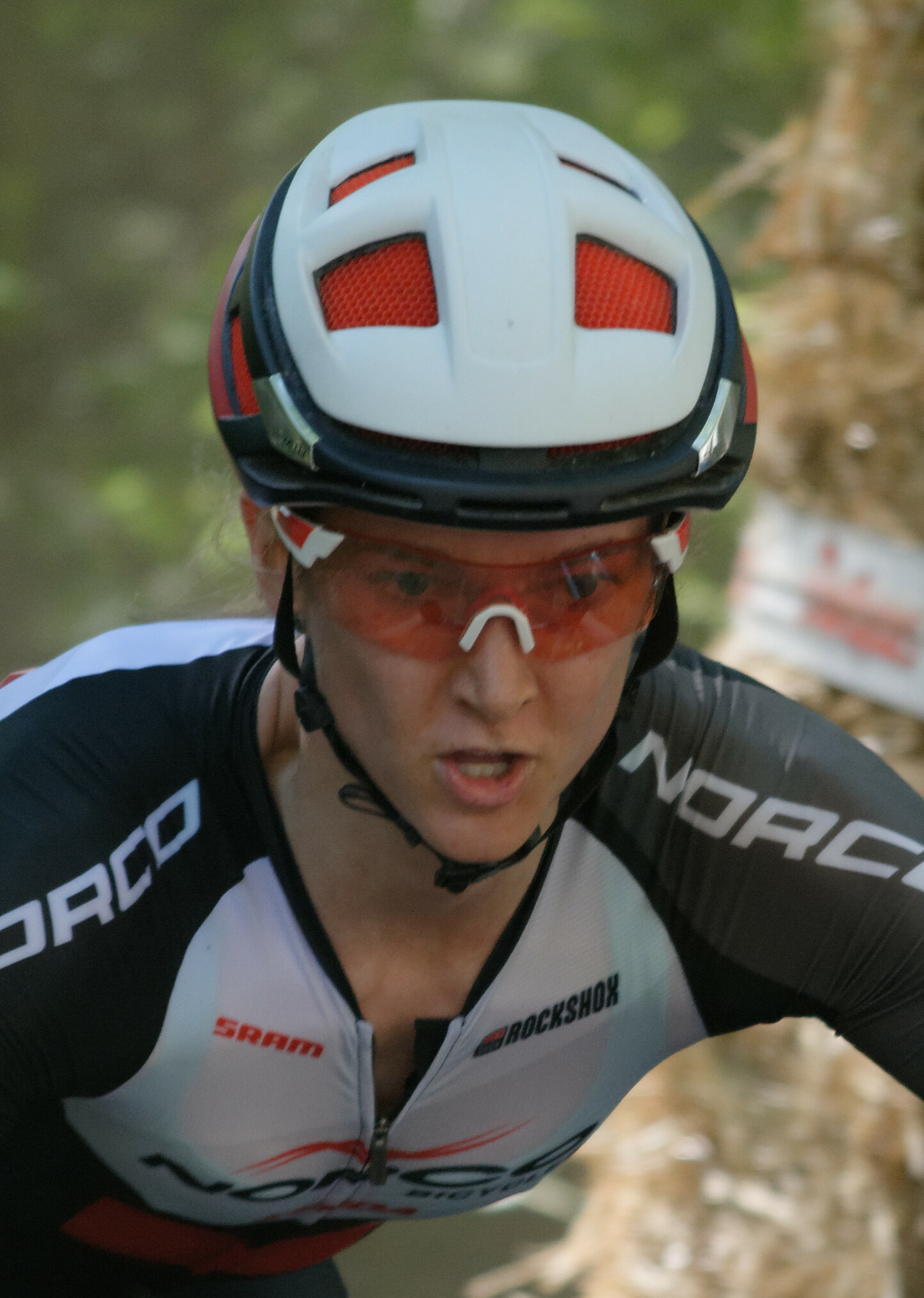
- Haley Smith at the MTB World Cup in 2017

Personal information
- Born: 22 November 1993 (age 32) Markham, Ontario, Canada

Cycling career
- Sport: Cycling
- Role: Rider
Medal record
Women's mountain bike
Representing Canada
Commonwealth Games
Bronze medal – third place	2018 Gold Coast	Cross-country

Haley Smith (born 22 November 1993) is a Canadian racing cyclist. She competed in the women's cross-country event at the 2018 Commonwealth Games, winning the bronze medal. In July 2021, Smith was named in Canada's 2020 Olympic team.
