= Alan Hatherly =

South African cyclist (born 1996)

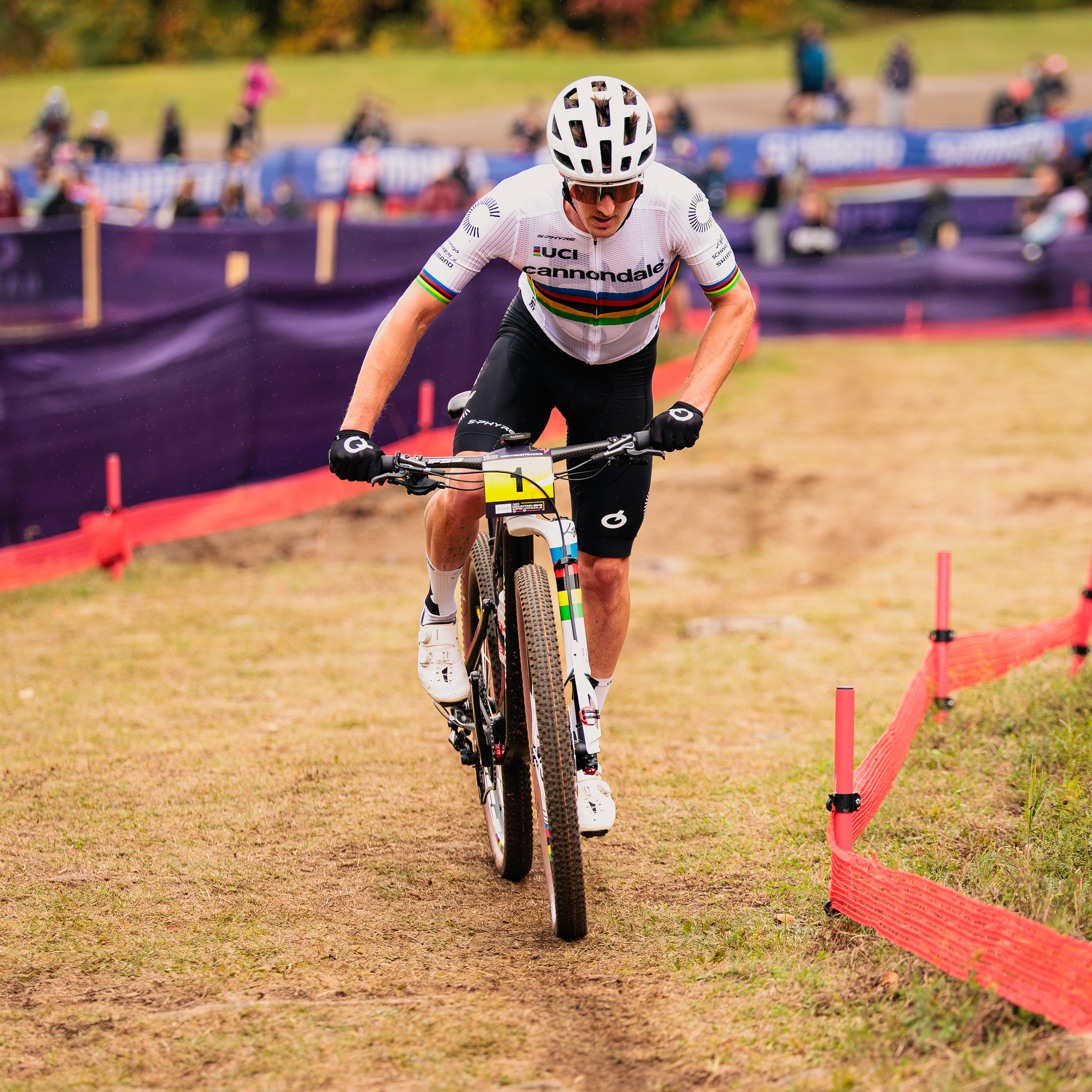
- Alan Hatherly competes in the UCI Cross Country MTB World Series at Mont-Sainte-Anne, Canada in 2024.

Personal information
- Born: 15 March 1996 (age 30) Durban, KwaZulu-Natal, South Africa
- Height: 180 cm (5 ft 11 in)
- Weight: 62 kg (137 lb)

Cycling career
- Sport: Cycling
- Current team: Team Jayco–AlUla
- Disciplines: Mountain bike; Road
- Role: Rider
- Rider type: Cross-country

Professional teams
- 2015: Kargo Pro MTB Team
- 2019–2020: Specialized Racing
- 2021–2024: Cannondale Factory Racing
- 2023: EF Education–Nippo Development Team
- 2025–: Team Jayco–AlUla

Major wins
- Mountain bike World XC Championships (2024, 2025) XC World Cup (2024) 3 individual wins (2024, 2025) Road One-day races and Classics National Time Trial Championships (2025)
Medal record
Men's mountain bike racing
Olympic Games
Bronze medal – third place	2024 Paris	Cross-country
World Championships
Gold medal – first place	2018 Lenzerheide	Under-23 Cross-country
Gold medal – first place	2019 Mont-Sainte-Anne	E-MTB Cross-country
Gold medal – first place	2024 Vallnord	Cross country
Gold medal – first place	2025 Valais	Cross country
Bronze medal – third place	2024 Vallnord	Cross-country short track
Commonwealth Games
Bronze medal – third place	2018 Gold Coast	Cross-country

Alan Hatherly (born 15 March 1996) is a South African professional mountain bike racer and road cyclist, who rides for UCI WorldTeam Team Jayco–AlUla. He won the bronze medal at the 2024 Summer Olympics finishing with a time of 1:26:33, the first African and non-European to win a medal in the men's event.

== Career ==
Hatherly rode at the cross-country event at the 2016 Summer Olympics. He finished in 26th place with a time of 1:42:03. He qualified to represent South Africa at the 2020 Summer Olympics and completed the event, finishing in 8th place with a time of 1:26:33.

In 2018, Hatherly achieved a bronze medal at the Commonwealth Games, subsequently going on to be crowned the 2018 Under 23 Cross Country World Champion.

In early 2019, it was announced that he would leave South African team Team Spur, and ride for the Specialized Factory team for 2019. He moved to Cannondale Factory Racing for the 2021 season and beyond.

After the 2024 Olympics, Hatherly competed at the Mountain Bike World Championships in Andorra. He placed third in Cross-country short track behind France's Victor Koretzky and Great Britain's Charlie Aldridge. Later he won Cross-country Olympic event overtaking Koretzky on the last long climb.

Since 2023, he has also competed in road cycling, joining UCI Continental team EF Education–Nippo Development Team.

== Major results ==
=== Mountain bike ===
2014
3rd Cross-country, African Junior Championships
2016
1st Cross-country, African Under-23 Championships
2017
1st Cross-country, African Championships
1st Cross-country, National Championships
2nd Cross-country, UCI World Under-23 Championships
UCI Under-23 XCO World Cup

2nd Vallnord

2018
1st Cross-country, UCI World Under-23 Championships
1st Cross-country, African Championships
1st Cross-country, National Championships
UCI Under-23 XCO World Cup

1st Mont-Sainte-Anne
3rd Nové Město

3rd Cross-country, Commonwealth Games
2019
1st Cross-country, UCI World E-MTB Championships
African Championships

1st Cross-country
1st Team relay

1st Cross-country, National Championships
1st African classification, Cape Epic (with Matthew Beers)
2020
1st Cross-country, National Championships
UCI XCO World Cup

5th Nové Město II

2021
1st Cross-country, National Championships
UCI XCO World Cup

4th Les Gets
4th Lenzerheide

2022
1st Overall UCI XCC World Cup

1st Petrópolis
2nd Vallnord
2nd Val di Sole
3rd Lenzerheide

UCI XCO World Cup

3rd Leogang
5th Nové Město

2023
XCO Shimano Super Cup

1st Banyoles

SA Cup Series

1st Cape Town

UCI XCO World Cup

2nd Lenzerheide
4th Leogang
5th Val di Sole

UCI XCC World Cup

2nd Val di Sole

XCC Shimano Super Cup

3rd Banyoles

2024
UCI World Championships

1st Cross-country
3rd Short track

1st Overall UCI XCO World Cup

1st Les Gets
1st Mont-Sainte-Anne
2nd Val di Sole
2nd Lake Placid
3rd Araxá

2nd Overall UCI XCC World Cup

1st Les Gets
3rd Araxá
3rd Lake Placid
3rd Mont-Sainte-Anne

3rd Cross-country, Olympic Games
2025
1st Cross-country, UCI World Championships
UCI XCO World Cup

1st Lenzerheide
4th Les Gets

==== UCI World Cup results ====
Season	1	2	3	4	5	6	7	8	9	10	Rank	Points
2019	ALB; 37	NOV; 28	AND; 27	LES; 43	VAL; DNF	LEN; DNF	SNO; 58				49	169
2020	LEN; NH	VAL; NH	LES; NH	NOV; 6	NOV; 5						6	300
2021	ALB; 8	NOV; 6	LEO; 24	LES; 4	LEN; 4	SNO; 25					5	687
2022	PET; 9	ALB; 7	NOV; 5	LEO; 3	LEN; 2	AND; 25	SNO; 8	MON; 17	VAL; 11		5	1475
2023	NOV; 10	LEN; 2	LEO; 4	VAL; 5	AND; DNF	LES; 20	SNO; 8	MON; 32			8	1055
2024	MAI; 8	ARA; 3	NOV; 9	VAL; 2	CRA; 20	LES; 1	LAK; 2	MON; 1			1	1678
2025	ARA	ARA	NOV; 9	LEO; 10	VAL	AND	LES; 4	LEN; 1	LAK	MON	28*	259*

* Season still in progress

=== Road ===
2023
National Championships

2nd Time trial
5th Road race

2024
1st Overall Tour du Cap

1st Stages 1 & 2

2nd Time trial, National Championships
2025 (1 pro win)
1st Time trial, National Championships
6th Overall AlUla Tour
2026
3rd Overall Settimana Internazionale di Coppi e Bartali
