= Till Drobisch =

Namibian cyclist

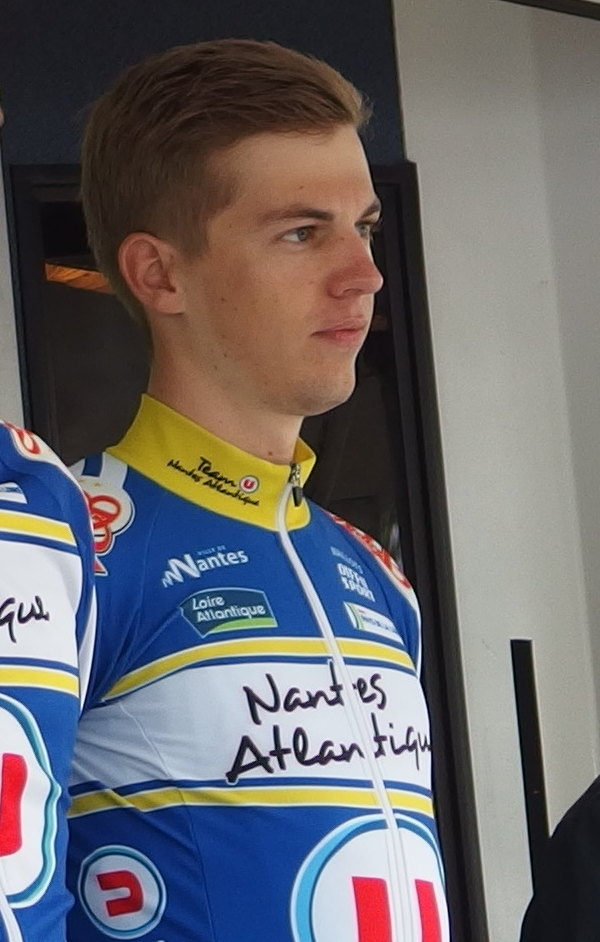
- Till Drobisch in 2015

Personal information
- Born: 2 March 1993 (age 33) Windhoek, Namibia
- Height: 1.79 m (5 ft 10 in)
- Weight: 63 kg (139 lb)

Cycling career
- Sport: Cycling
- Discipline: Road
- Role: Rider
- Rider type: Sprinter

Amateur team
- 2012–2014: World Cycling Centre

Professional team
- 2015–2016: Team Stuttgart

Major wins
- One-day races and Classics National Road Race Championships (2013, 2017) National Time Trial Championships (2013, 2014, 2016, 2017)

Till Drobisch (born 2 March 1993) is a Namibian professional racing cyclist. He rode in two events at the 2014 Commonwealth Games. In February 2016 he won the Namibia National Individual Time Trial event. The following year, he won the Namibian National Road Race Championships.

== Major results ==
2010
1st Junior National Road Race Championships
1st Junior National Time Trial Championships
2013
1st National Road Race Championships
1st National Time Trial Championships
1st Under–23 National Time Trial Championships
1st Under–23 National Road Race Championships
2014
1st National Time Trial Championships
1st Under–23 National Time Trial Championships
2nd National Road Race Championships
2nd Under–23 National Road Race Championships
2016
1st National Time Trial Championships
2nd National Road Race Championships
2017
1st National Road Race Championships
1st National Time Trial Championships
