= Tjipee Murangi =

Namibian cyclist

Personal information
- Born: 16 August 1986 (age 40)

Cycling career
- Sport: Cycling
- Role: Rider

Tjipee Murangi (born 16 August 1986) is a Namibian professional racing cyclist. In 2009 he won the Namibian National Road Race Championships.
