= Martin Freyer =

Namibian cyclist

Personal information
- Full name: Martin Freyer
- Born: 4 October 1995 (age 31) Harare, Zimbabwe

Cycling career
- Sport: Cycling
- Current team: CIOVITA Racing Collective & Danste Racing
- Disciplines: Road, XC & Ultra-endurance
- Role: Rider

Amateur teams
- 2017: Team Kia Elite
- 2018–2025: Hollard Life

Martin Freyer (born 4 October 1995 in Harare) is a Zimbabwean-born Namibian cyclist. In February 2018, he won the Namibian National Road Race Championships. In November 2022 he conquered to win The Munga 1,127 km MTB Ultra-endurance Race — one of the toughest MTB races in the world in 56 hrs 36 min.

== Major results ==
2013
National Junior Road Championships

1st Road race
1st Time trial

3rd Nedbank Cycle Classic
2015
National Road Championships

1st Under-23 road race
1st Under-23 time trial
2nd Road race
3rd Time trial

2nd Nedbank Cycle Classic
2017
National Road Championships

1st Under-23 road race
1st Under-23 time trial
2nd Time trial

2018
National Road Championships

1st Road race
2nd Time trial

2020
Nedbank Desert Dash - 401 km MTB Ultra-endurance Race

2nd - Solo Men

2022
The Munga - 1127 km MTB Ultra-endurance Race

Winner - Completed in 56 h 36 m

2024
Nedbank Rock & Rut XC Series Mountain Bike

1st Elite Men, Nedbank Rock and Rut XC4

Gravel & Dirt MTB Marathon Series

1st Elite Men - XCM

National Road Championships

3rd Road race

National XCM (Cross-Country Marathon)

3rd Elite Men - National XCM

Nedbank Desert Dash - 401 km MTB Ultra-endurance Race

4th Solo Men

2025
Nedbank Rock & Rut XC Series Mountain Bike

1st Elite Men, Nedbank Rock and Rut XC4

National XCM (Cross-Country Marathon)

1st Elite Men - National XCC
1st Elite Men - National E-MTB Cross-Country
2nd Elite Men - National XCO

National Road Championships

2nd Road race
2nd Time trial

Nedbank Desert Dash - 401 km MTB Ultra-endurance Race

3rd Solo Men
