= James Reid (cyclist) =

South African cyclist

Personal information
- Born: 1 August 1992 (age 34)
- Height: 180 cm (5 ft 11 in)
- Weight: 70 kg (154 lb)

Cycling career
- Sport: Cycling
- Discipline: Mountain bike
- Role: Rider

James Reid (born 1 August 1992) is a South African mountain bike racer. He rode at the cross-country event at the 2016 Summer Olympics. He finished in 42nd place after crashing out.
