= Michelle Vorster =

Namibian cyclist (born 1978)

Personal information
- Full name: Michelle Vorster
- Born: 12 September 1978 (age 48) Windhoek, Namibia

Cycling career
- Sport: Cycling
- Disciplines: Mountain biking; Road
- Role: Rider

Michelle Mills-Vorster (born 12 September 1978 in Windhoek, Namibia) is a Namibian cross-country cyclist.

== Career ==
She is the first ever Namibian female to qualify for the Olympic Cross Country event and competed at the 2016 Summer Olympics in the women's cross country race. Vorster also qualified and competed in the 2018 Commonwealth Games in Gold Coast, Australia. She competed in the Elite Road and Cross Country Olympic events. She finished in 8th position in the Cross Country Olympic event, the highest position by any Namibian cyclist to date.

Vorster is also an African Continental Champion (2017) and multiple Namibian National Champion title holder in Mountain Bike Cross Country Olympic and Marathon cycling.

== Major results ==
2015
1st Cross-country, National Mountain Bike Championships
2nd Team time trial, African Road Championships
National Road Championships

2nd Road race
2nd Time trial

3rd Cross-country, African Mountain Bike Championships
6th Time trial, African Games
2016
1st Cross-country, National Mountain Bike Championships
2nd Road race, National Road Championships
3rd Cross-country, African Mountain Bike Championships
2017
1st Cross-country, African Mountain Bike Championships
1st Cross-country, National Mountain Bike Championships
2018
1st Cross-country, National Mountain Bike Championships
2nd Road race, National Road Championships
8th Cross-country, Commonwealth Games
2019
1st Cross-country, National Mountain Bike Championships
National Road Championships

2nd Road race
2nd Time trial

2020
1st Cross-country, National Mountain Bike Championships
