= Namibian National Road Race Championships =

National road cycling championship in Namibia

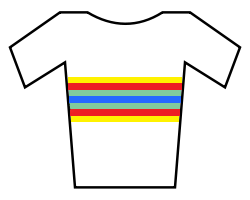
The Champion's Jersey

The Namibian National Road Race Championship is a cycling race where the Namibian cyclists decide who will become the champion for the year to come. The winners of each event are awarded with a symbolic cycling jersey, just like the national flag, these colours can be worn by the rider at other road racing events in the country to show their status as national champion. The champion's stripes can be combined into a sponsored rider's team kit design for this purpose.

== Men ==
=== Elite ===
Namibian National Road Race Championships – Men's elite race
Race details
- Region: Namibia
- Discipline: Road bicycle racing
- Type: One-day

History
- First edition: 2005
- First winner: Dan Craven
- Most wins: Dan Craven (6 wins)
- Most recent: Tristan De Lange

Year	Gold	Silver	Bronze
2005	Dan Craven		
2006	Dan Craven		
2007	Erik Hoffmann	Jacques Celliers	Ermin Van Wyk
2008	Dan Craven	Tjipee Murangi	Jacques Celliers
2009	Tjipee Murangi	Ingram Cuff	Heinrich Köhne
2010	Joris Harteveld	Ingram Cuff	Jacobus Van Zyl
2011	Lotto Petrus	Marc Bassingthwaighte	Heiko Redecker
2012	Lotto Petrus	Dan Craven	Marc Bassingthwaighte
2013	Till Drobisch	Raul Costa Seibeb	Lotto Petrus
2014	Raul Costa Seibeb	Till Drobisch	Norbert Meyer
2015	Dan Craven	Martin Freyer	Michael N. Pretorius
2016	Dan Craven	Till Drobisch	Raul Costa Seibeb
2017	Till Drobisch	Dan Craven	Raul Costa Seibeb
2018	Martin Freyer	Drikus Coetzee	Dan Craven
2019	Alex Miller	Dan Craven	Xavier Papo
2020	Dan Craven	Tristan De Lange	Drikus Coetzee
2021	Drikus Coetzee	Tristan De Lange	Ingram Cuff
2022	Drikus Coetzee	Hugo Hahn	Jean-Paul Burger
2023	Tristan De Lange	Drikus Coetzee	Ingram Cuff

== Women ==
=== Elite ===
Namibian National Road Race Championships – Women's elite race
Race details
- Region: Namibia
- Discipline: Road bicycle racing
- Type: One-day

History
- First edition: 2007
- First winner: Chermaine Shannon
- Most wins: Vera Looser (11 wins)
- Most recent: Vera Looser

Year	Gold	Silver	Bronze
2007	Chermaine Shannon	Johanita de Waal	Sheena Schwartz
2008	Cordula Möller	Wanda Tattersall	Almarie Mostert
2009	Carmen Bassingthwaighte	Wanda Tattersall	Susan Horn
2010	Heletje Van Staden	Carmen Bassingthwaighte	Chermaine Shannon
2011	Not held		
2012	Vera Looser	Heletje Van Staden	Hayley Brand
2013	Irene Steyn	Gene Keet	Hester Prins
2014	Vera Looser	Heletje Van Staden	Irene Steyn
2015	Vera Looser	Michelle Vorster	Irene Steyn
2016	Vera Looser	Michelle Vorster	Hester Prins
2017	Vera Looser	Michelle Doman	Irene Steyn
2018	Vera Looser	Michelle Vorster	Michelle Doman
2019	Vera Looser	Michelle Vorster	Irene Steyn
2020	Vera Looser	Irene Steyn	
2021	Vera Looser	Gabriela Raith	Risa Dreyer
2022	Vera Looser	Courtney Liebenberg	Melissa Hinz
2023	Vera Looser	Melissa Hinz	Anri Krugel

== See also ==
- Namibian National Time Trial Championships
- National road cycling championships
