= Drikus Coetzee =

Namibian cyclist (born 1993)

Personal information
- Full name: Drikus Coetzee
- Born: 15 April 1993 (age 33) Swakopmund, Namibia
- Height: 1.90 m (6 ft 3 in)
- Weight: 78 kg (172 lb)

Cycling career
- Sport: Cycling
- Current team: Hollard Insurance
- Discipline: Road
- Role: Rider

Amateur teams
- 2017: Team Kia Elite
- 2018: Team Office- Guru
- 2019–2020: Hollard Life
- 2021–2023: Simonis Storm Powered by Hollard
- 2024–: Hollard Insurance

Major wins
- One-day races and Classics National Time Trial Championships (2018, 2019, 2020, 2021, 2023, 2024) National Road Race Championships (2021, 2022)

Drikus Coetzee (born 15 April 1993) is a Namibian cyclist.

== Major results ==
2017
National Road Championships

3rd Time trial
5th Road race

2018
National Road Championships

1st Time trial
2nd Road race

5th African Time Trial Championships
9th Overall Tour de Limpopo
2019
National Road Championships

1st Time trial
4th Road race

5th African Time Trial Championships
10th African Games
2020
National Road Championships

1st Time trial
3rd Road race

2021
National Road Championships

1st Time trial
1st Road race

2022
National Road Championships

1st Road race
2nd Time trial

2023
1st Overall Tour de Windhoek
National Road Championships

1st Time trial
2nd Road race

1st Nedbank WPP 1
1st Nedbank WPP 2
1st Nedbank WPP 3
1st Nedbank Cycle Challenge
2024
National Road Championships

1st Time trial
2nd Road race
