= Chermaine Shannon =

Namibian cyclist

Personal information
- Born: 24 December 1977 (age 48)

Cycling career
- Sport: Cycling
- Role: Rider

Chermaine Shannon (born 24 December 1977) is a Namibian professional racing cyclist. In 2007, she won the Namibian National Road Race Championships.
