= JoBerg2c =

joberg2c
Race details
- Date: April/May
- Region: South Africa
- Discipline: Mountain biking
- Competition: Professional and amateur
- Type: Stage race

History
- First edition: 2010
- Editions: 8

The joberg2c was the longest mountain biking stage race in South Africa if not the world. It took place over nine days and covered approximately 900 kilometres (exact distances vary from year to year) from Heidelberg in Gauteng to Scottburgh on the KwaZulu-Natal coast.

== Race overview ==
joberg2c's organising team was led by Craig Wapnick, Gary Green and Glen Haw. Green and Haw are responsible for the successful Berg and Bush and sani2c mountain bike stage races respectively. The middle and last three days of the joBerg2c overlap with Berg and Bush and sani2c in varying degrees.

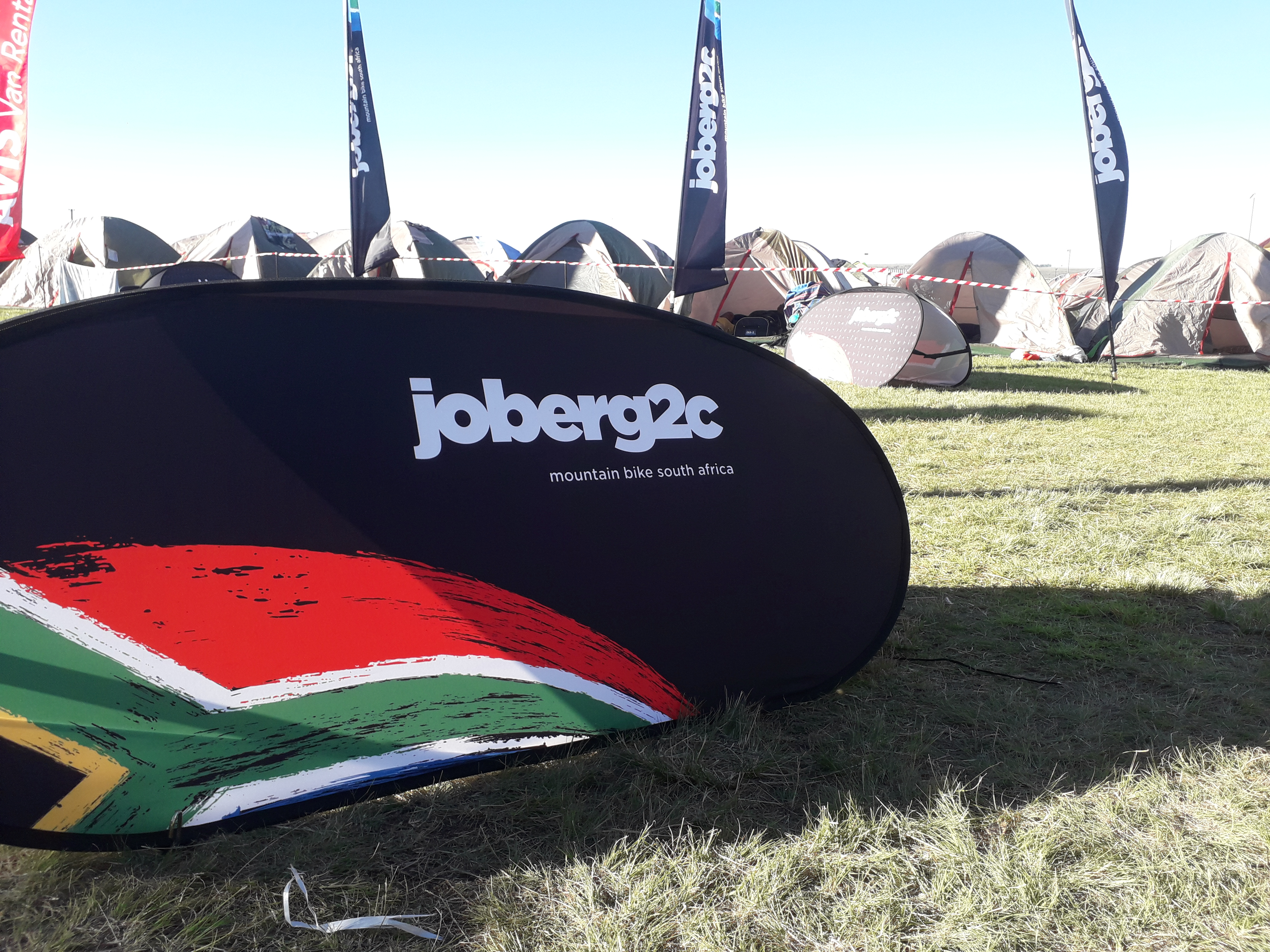
One of the tent villages in Reitz, Free State 2019

The event was fully serviced – each rider (team of two or solo) is allocated a tent and three meals per day at the eight overnight stops or race villages. Additional services such as massage therapists and bike mechanics are also available.

The joberg2c is a GPS navigated event. Every rider uses a GPS to follow the tracks.

Furthermore, top tier amateur and semi-pro riders can now apply for sponsorship on the condition that they are serious contenders for the main prize purse. This is aimed at developing talent in the cycling community, especially riders from a previously disadvantaged background. There are also a number of entries available for media representatives.

== Tour de Farms ==
One of the differentiating factors of this race was that the bulk of the route crossed more than 90 private farms. Riders traversed a variety of agricultural holdings including game, dairy and cattle country, maize lands, rose and stud farms, sugarcane fields and pine plantations.

== Route breakdown ==
The 910-kilometre route takes riders across the country’s agricultural hinterland – from Heidelberg in Gauteng, through the north-eastern Free State and along the foothills of the Drakensberg to Scottburgh in KwaZulu-Natal.

The route consisted of a combination of single track, 4x4 Isuzu track and private dirt roads, as well as short stretches on district by-ways. Although the basic skeleton of the route remains unchanged from year to year, the exact distances varied as organisers aim to add more and more single track.

- Day one: Heidelberg to Frankfort distance 116 km, ascent 855m, descent 867m
- Day two: Frankfort to Reitz distance 93 km, ascent 1001m, descent 916m
- Day three: Reitz to Sterkfontein Dam distance 122 km, ascent 1118m, descent 1082m
- Day four: Sterkfontein Dam to Emseni distance 93 km, ascent 1100m, descent 1706m
- Day five: Emseni to Nottingham Rd distance 122 km, ascent 2241m, descent 1757m
- Day six: Nottingham Rd to Glencairn Farm distance 98 km, ascent 2022m, descent 1997m
- Day seven: Glencairn Farm to Mackenzie Club distance 82 km, ascent 914, descent 1356m
- Day eight: Mackenzie Club to Jolivet distance 99 km, ascent 1705m, descent 2163m
- Day nine: Jolivet to Scottburgh distance 84 km, ascent 854m, descent 1551m

== Racing categories and prizes ==
The joberg2c was one of the best mountain bike races in the country but for most, it is more of a ride. There are three racing snake sections (men's, ladies' and mixed) that receive prize money for the overall classification, although serious riders in the sub-veteran, veteran and masters categories may compete for the same prizes.

== Previous winners ==
Year	Category	Winners	Overall time
2010	Elite men	Andrew McLean / Shan Wilson	38:22:42
2010	Elite women	Lise Olivier / Yolandi du Toit	45:16:50
2010	Mixed	Johan Labuschagne / Yolande de Villiers	40:52:24
2011	Elite men	Neil MacDonald / Waylon Woolcock	34:20:18
2011	Elite women	Ischen Stopforth / Catherine Williamson	40:45:34
2011	Mixed	Erik Kleinhans / Ariane Kleinhans	38:41:50
2012	Elite men	Kevin Evans / David George	32:27:39
2012	Elite women	Ischen Stopforth / Catherine Williamson	38:33:27
2012	Mixed	Erik Kleinhans / Ariane Kleinhans	36:08:58
2013	Elite men	Neil MacDonald / Brandon Stewart	34:11:05
2014	Elite men	Gawie Combrink / Johann Rabie	33:26:41
2014	Elite women	Janine King / Amy McDougal	40:35:55
2014	Mixed	Yolande De Villiers / Franso Steyn	36:50:51
2015	Elite men	Gawie Combrink / Johann Rabie	34:38:51
2015	Elite women	Catherine Williamson / Yolande De Villiers	38:33:55
2015	Mixed	Billy Stelling / Carmen Buchacher	39:01:21
2016	Elite men	Nico Bell / Gawie Combrink	32:29:25
2016	Elite women	Samantha Saunders / Anriette Schoeman	39:50:19
2016	Mixed	Darren Lill / Candice Neethling	35:10:58
2017	Elite men	Philip Buys / Matthys Beukes	33:22:01
2017	Elite women	Lolita Van Aardt / Simone Van Aardt	43:14:42
2017	Mixed	Darren Lill / Candice Neethling	35:47:42
2018	Elite men	Gawie Combinck / Nico Bell	33:06:02
2018	Elite women	Sarah Hill / Theresa Ralph	38:49:31
2018	Mixed	Arno du Toit / Amy Macdougall	35:14:33
2019	Elite men Solo	Matthys Beukes	34:29:56
2019	Elite women	Sarah Hill / Theresa Ralph	38:38:08
2019	Mixed	Mike Posthumus / Amy Macdougall	36:39:07
