= Raul Costa Seibeb =

Namibian cyclist

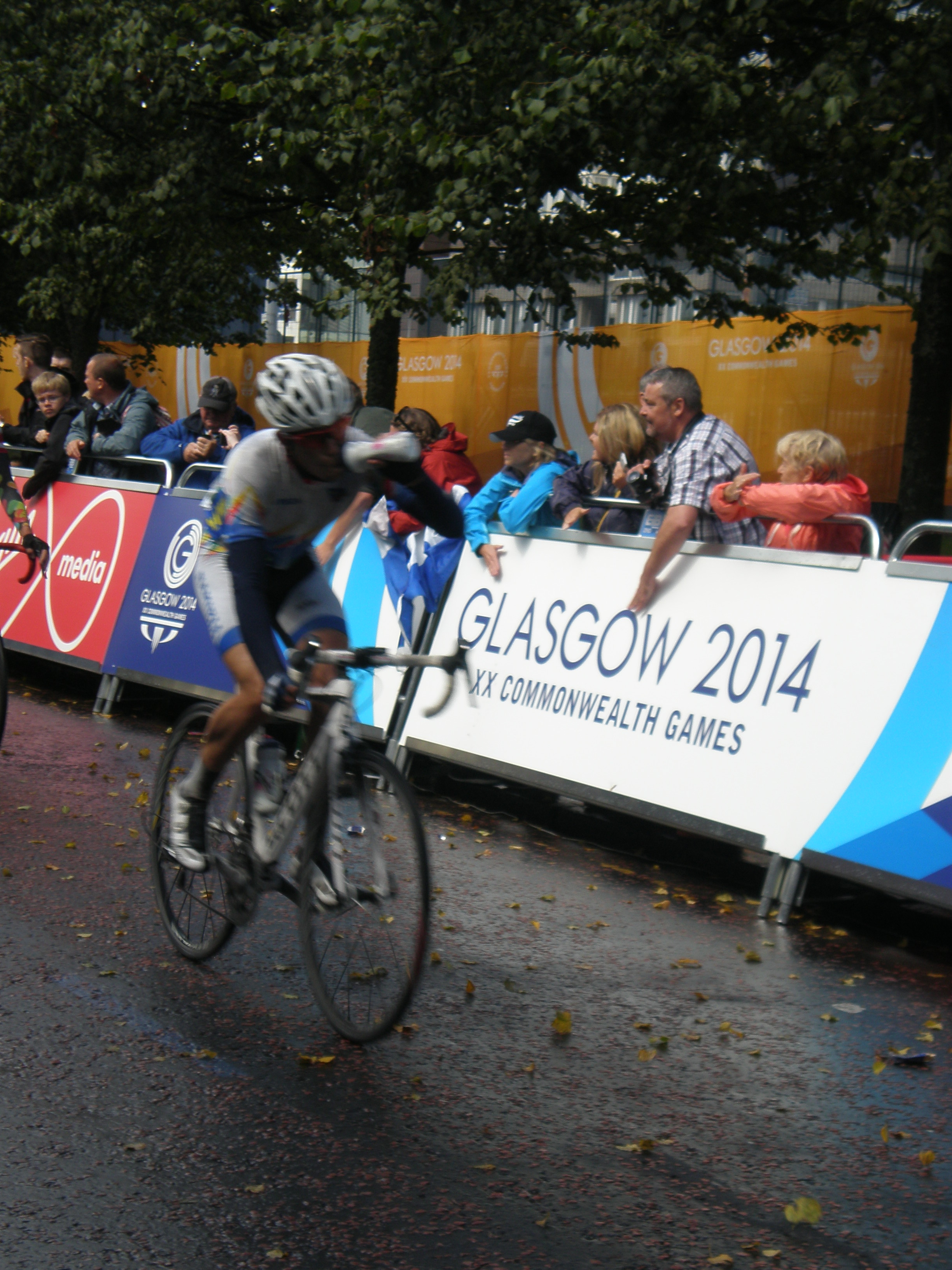
- Costa Seibeb at the 2014 Commonwealth Games

Personal information
- Full name: Raul Costa Seibeb
- Born: 7 February 1992 Windhoek, Namibia
- Died: 1 May 2017 (aged 25)

Cycling career
- Sport: Cycling
- Disciplines: Road; Mountain biking
- Role: Rider

Amateur team
- 2013–2014: UCI World Cycling Centre Africa

Raul Costa Seibeb (7 February 1992 – 1 May 2017) was a Namibian professional racing cyclist. In 2014 he won the Namibian National Road Race Championships. He died on 1 May 2017 in a car accident.

== Major results ==
2013
National Road Championships

2nd Road race
3rd Time trial

9th Time trial, African Road Championships
2014
National Road Championships

1st Road race
2nd Time trial

2015
2nd Time trial, National Road Championships
2016
3rd Road race, National Road Championships
2017
National Road Championships

2nd Time trial
3rd Road race
