= Cape Pioneer Trek =

South African mountain biking event

Logo

The Cape Pioneer Trek is a 7-day South African mountain biking event through the Great and Little Karoo.

The 2012 Cape Pioneer Trek from 14 to 20 October, took riders through scenic areas such as the Swartberg Mountains, through Meiringspoort, and the forests of the Garden Route. The event consisted of a prologue of 15 km from Buffelsdrift Game Lodge to Oudtshoorn, stage 1 covering 103 km from Buffelsdrift Game Lodge to Oudtshoorn to Calitzdorp. Stage 2 was over 85 km from Calitzdorp to Prince Albert, stage 3 109 km from Prince Albert to De Rust, stage 4 63 km from De Rust to Louvain guest farm at Herold, stage 5 75 km from Herold to George, and finally stage 6 84 km from George to Oudtshoorn.

== Past winners ==
- 2012 Nico Bell & Gawie Combrinck (Westvaal Columbia), Yolande de Villiers & Yolande Speedy
- 2011 Kevin Evans & David George (Nedbank 360 Life), Ischen Stopforth & Catherine Williamson (Bizhub)
- 2010 Max Knox & Thomas Zahnd (RSA), Nathalie Schneitter & Renate Telser (Swi)
