= Heletje Van Staden =

Namibian cyclist

Personal information
- Born: 12 March 1988 (age 38)

Cycling career
- Sport: Cycling
- Role: Rider

Major wins
- One-day Races and Classics National Road Race Championships (2010)

Heletje Van Staden (born 12 March 1988) is a Namibian professional racing cyclist. In 2010, she won the Namibian National Road Race Championships.

== Major results ==
2010
1st Road race, National Road Championships
2011
African Road Championships

6th Time trial
7th Road race

2012
National Road Championships

2nd Road race
2nd Time trial

2013
7th Time trial, African Road Championships
2014
National Road Championships

2nd Road race
3rd Time trial

2015
4th Road race, National Road Championships
