= Yolande Speedy =

South African cyclist

Personal information
- Full name: Yolande Speedy
- Born: 30 December 1976 (age 49) Johannesburg, South Africa
- Height: 1.66 m (5 ft 5 1/2 in)
- Weight: 60 kg (132 lb)

Cycling career
- Sport: Cycling
- Current team: Team Qhubeka NextHash
- Discipline: Mountain biking
- Role: Rider
- Rider type: Cross-country

Amateur team
- 2007–2010: IMC Racing Activeworx

Professional team
- 2011–: Team Qhubeka NextHash

Major wins
- 2013 1st Absa Cape Epic Women's Category 2013 1st Absa Cape Epic Mixed Category

Yolande Speedy (born 30 December 1976, in Johannesburg) is a South African professional mountain biker. She has claimed two gold medals in the women's elite cross-country race at the African Mountain Bike Championships (2007 and 2013), and also represented her nation South Africa at the 2008 Summer Olympics. In 2007 Speedy competed in the Absa Cape Epic Mixed Category with team mate Paul Cordes, winning the category. She claimed 1st place again in 2013, this time in the Women's Category with team mate Catherine Williamson. Throughout her sporting career, Speedy has been training as an amateur rider for the IMC Racing Activeworx Mountain Biking Team, until she turned professional in 2010 and thereby raced for more than three seasons on Team Qhubeka NextHash.

Speedy qualified for the South African squad, as a lone female rider, in the women's cross-country race at the 2008 Summer Olympics in Beijing by finishing first and receiving an automatic berth from the UCI African Championships and by recording dominant triumphs in the final stage of the Mazda MTN National Cross-Country Series in Nelspruit. With only two laps left to complete the race, Speedy suffered from a heat-related fatigue, and instead decided to pull off directly from the course, finishing only in twenty-second place.
