= Gerhard Mans (cyclist) =

Namibian cyclist

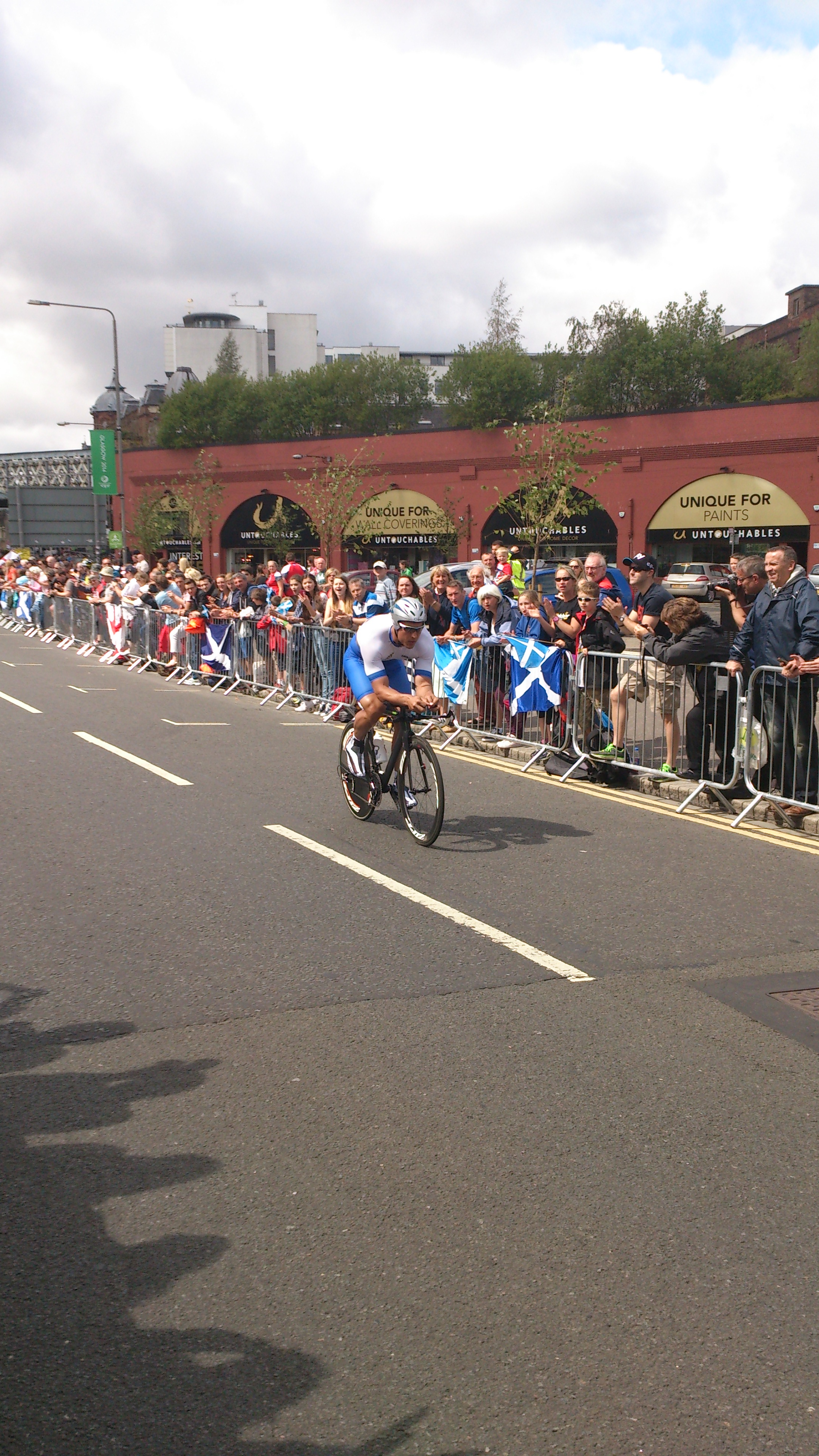
- Road time trial, 2014 Commonwealth Games

Personal information
- Full name: Gerhard Mans
- Born: 4 September 1987 (age 39) Windhoek, Namibia

Cycling career
- Sport: Cycling
- Current team: Hollard Life
- Disciplines: Road; Mountain biking
- Role: Rider

Amateur team
- 2018–: Hollard

Gerhard Mans (born 4 September 1987) is a Namibian professional racing cyclist. He won the Namibian National Time Trial Championships in 2015. He also rode in two events at the 2014 Commonwealth Games.

== Major results ==
2013
2nd Time trial, National Road Championships
2015
1st Time trial, National Road Championships
2016
3rd Time trial, National Road Championships
