= Daniel Rinner =

Liechtenstein cyclist (born 1990)

Personal information
- Full name: Daniel Rinner
- Born: 11 November 1990 (age 35) Vaduz, Liechtenstein

Cycling career
- Sport: Cycling
- Current team: Retired
- Discipline: Road
- Role: Rider

Professional teams
- 2009–2011: Tyrol–Team Radland Tirol
- 2012–2013: Team Vorarlberg

Daniel Rinner (born 11 November 1990 in Vaduz) is a Liechtensteiner former professional cyclist.

== Major results ==
2007
National Road Championships

2nd Road race
2nd Time trial

2008
2nd Time trial, National Road Championships
8th Overall Mainfranken-Tour
2010
National Road Championships

1st Road race
1st Time trial

2011
3rd Time trial, National Road Championships
2012
National Road Championships

1st Road race
2nd Time trial
