= Lotto Petrus =

Namibian cyclist

Personal information
- Born: 3 December 1987 (age 38)

Cycling career
- Sport: Cycling
- Discipline: Road
- Role: Rider

Amateur team
- 2018–2019: Team NCCS

Professional teams
- 2008–2009: Team Neotel
- 2010–2012: MTN–Energade

Lotto Petrus (born 3 December 1987) is a Namibian professional racing cyclist. In 2011 and 2012 he won the Namibian National Road Race Championships.

== Major results ==
2005
3rd Nedbank Cycle Classic
2009
African Road Championships

1st Under-23 road race
2nd Team time trial
8th Road race

2011
National Road Championships

1st Road race
1st Time trial

7th Time trial, African Road Championships
2012
National Road Championships

1st Road race
1st Time trial

2013
3rd Road race, National Road Championships
2014
2nd Nedbank Cycle Classic
2016
3rd Nedbank Cycle Classic
National Road Championships

4th Road race
5th Time trial

2018
3rd Nedbank Cycle Classic
4th Road race, National Road Championships
