= Joris Harteveld =

Namibian cyclist

Personal information
- Born: 2 July 1968 (age 58) Gobabis, Namibia

Cycling career
- Sport: Cycling
- Role: Rider

Joris Harteveld (born 2 July 1968) is a Namibian professional racing cyclist. In 2010 he won the Namibian National Road Race Championships.
