= Philip Buys =

South African cyclist (born 1988)

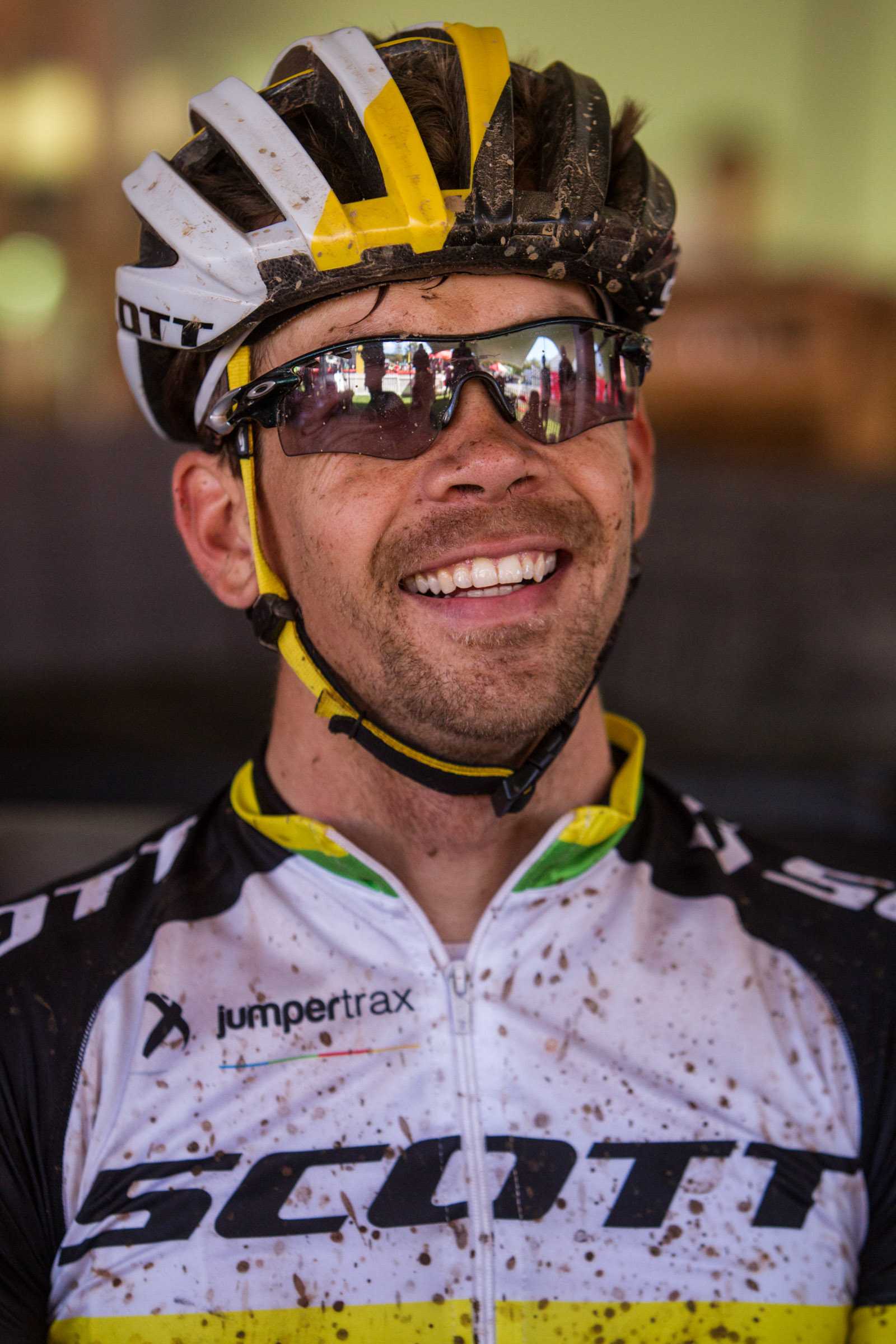
- Philip Buys (2014 Cape Epic Stage 6)

Personal information
- Born: 30 September 1988 (age 38) Durban, South Africa

Cycling career
- Sport: Cycling
- Discipline: Cross-country
- Role: Rider

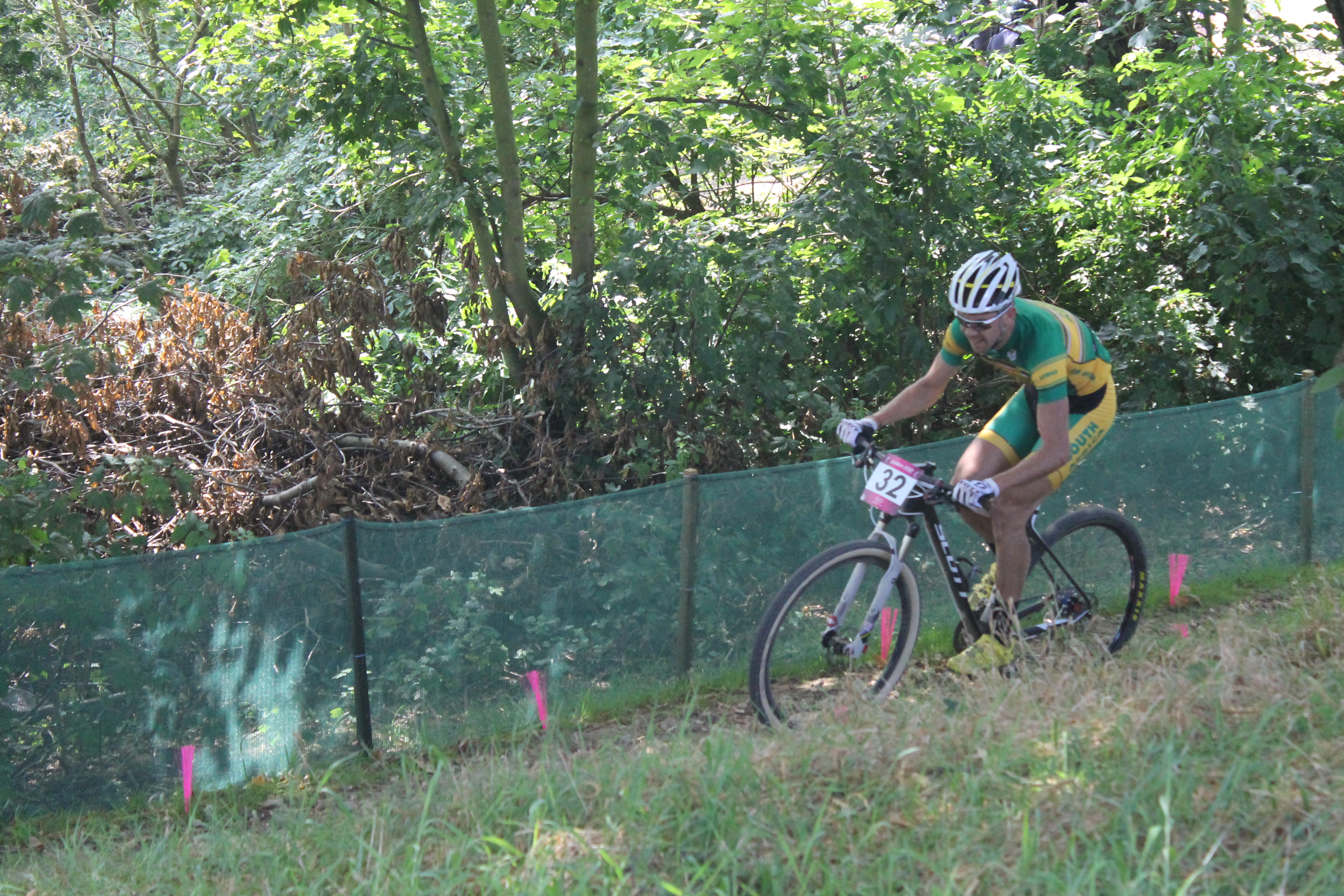
Philip Buys at the 2012 Summer Olympics

Philip Buys (30 September 1988, Durban) is a South African cross-country mountain biker. At the 2012 Summer Olympics, he competed in the Men's cross-country at Hadleigh Farm, finishing in 35th place.

== Major results ==
2011
3rd Cross-country, African Mountain Bike Championships
2012
1st Cross-country, African Mountain Bike Championships
2013
1st Cross-country, African Mountain Bike Championships
1st Cross-country, National Mountain Bike Championships
2014
1st Cross-country, African Mountain Bike Championships
2016
1st Cross-country, African Mountain Bike Championships
2nd Cross-country, National Mountain Bike Championships
2017
2nd Cross-country, National Mountain Bike Championships
2019
2nd Cross-country, African Mountain Bike Championships
3rd Cross-country, National Mountain Bike Championships
