= Dan Craven =

Namibian racing cyclist (born 1983)

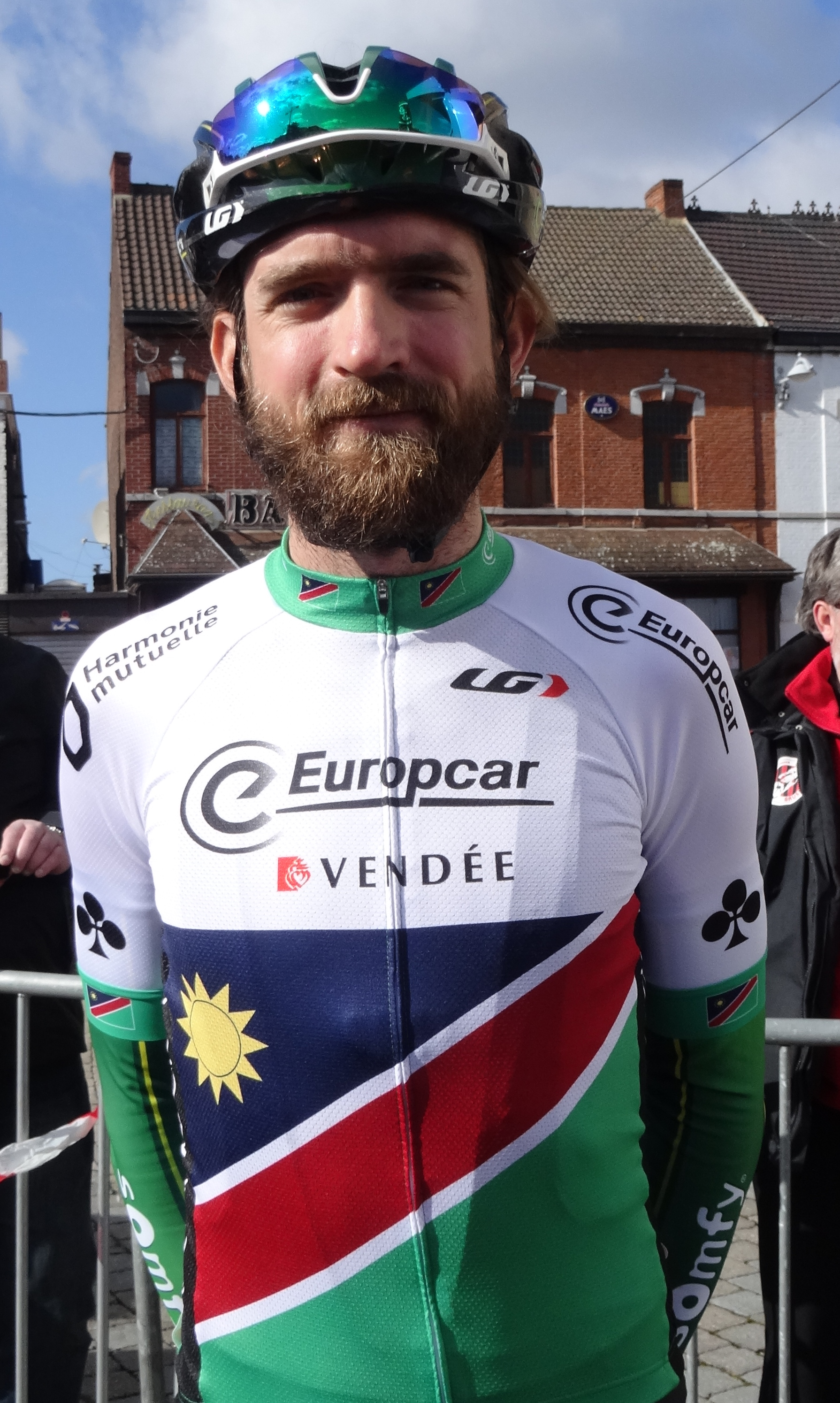
- Craven at the 2015 Le Samyn wearing his Namibian national champions jersey.

Personal information
- Full name: Dan Craven
- Born: 1 February 1983 (age 43) Otjiwarongo, South West Africa

Cycling career
- Sport: Cycling
- Discipline: Road
- Role: Rider
- Rider type: All-rounder

Amateur teams
- 2005–2008: Team Fidibc.com
- 2018–2019: Embrace the World
- 2019: Cycling Team Bochum
- 2019: NCCS Cycling Team

Professional teams
- 2009–2011: Rapha Condor
- 2012: Team IG–Sigma Sport
- 2013: Synergy Baku
- 2014: Bike Aid–Ride for Help
- 2014–2015: Team Europcar
- 2016–2017: Cycling Academy

Major wins
- One-day Races and Classics National Road Race Championships (2005, 2006, 2008, 2015, 2016, 2020)
Medal record
Men's road cycling
Representing Namibia
CAC Road African Championships
Silver medal – second place	2013 Sharm El Sheikh	Road Race

Dan Craven (born 1 February 1983) is a Namibian racing cyclist, who last rode for Namibian amateur team NCCS Cycling Team. He is the grandson of Danie Craven, the South African rugby union icon.

Craven started cycling seriously when he studied at Stellenbosch University. After graduating with a degree in Politics, Philosophy and Economics he moved to Switzerland in 2005 in order to pursue a cycling career.

A strong time trialist, Craven was a runner up in the 2006 African Championships, and boasts a 7th place in the time trial at the 2007 B World Championships in Cape Town.

Craven joined the Rapha Condor team for the 2009 season. Craven was the 2008 African Road Race champion, having taken the crown in Casablanca in November just two days after he had picked up a Bronze in the African Time Trial Championships. He joined Team IG–Sigma Sport for the 2012 season. He spent 2013 riding for Synergy Baku before joining the German-based Bike Aid–Ride for Help squad for 2014. In May 2014 it was announced that Craven had been signed to UCI World Tour team, Team Europcar, with effect from July. His first major goal was the last grand tour of 2014, the Vuelta a España.

In 2015 he won the Namibian National Road Race Championships for the fourth time.

== Major results ==
2005
1st Road race, National Road Championships
2006
1st Road race, National Road Championships
2nd Time trial, African Road Championships
2nd GP Demy–Cars
2007
2nd Time trial, National Road Championships
2nd Giro delle Valli Aretine
3rd GP Folignano
7th Time trial, UCI B World Championships
2008
African Road Championships

1st Road race
3rd Time trial

1st Road race, National Road Championships
1st Grand Prix Cristal Energie
2nd Trofeo Salvatore Morucci
3rd Giro del Cigno
3rd GP Inda–Trofeo Aras Frattini
5th GP Folignano
6th Coppa della Pace
2009
1st UCI Africa Tour
1st Chas Messenger Road Race
1st Shay Elliott Memorial Race
1st Stage 4 Tour of Rwanda
1st Clayton Velo Spring Classic
2nd Shay Elliott Memorial Race
2010
1st Clayton Velo Spring Classic
1st Stage 4 Tour of Rwanda
2nd East Midlands Classic
African Road Championships

3rd Road race
5th Time trial

3rd Overall Rás Tailteann

1st Stage 1

2011
4th Jock Wadley Memorial
5th Overall Vuelta Ciclista a León

1st Stage 3

5th East Yorkshire Classic
7th Overall La Tropicale Amissa Bongo

1st Mountains classification

8th Overall Ronde de l'Oise
8th Ryedale Grand Prix
2012
National Road Championships

2nd Time trial
2nd Road race

7th Lincoln Grand Prix
2013
African Road Championships

2nd Road race
6th Individual time trial

2014
1st Overall Tour du Cameroun

1st Mountains classification

5th Overall Tour du Maroc
9th Road race, Commonwealth Games
2015
1st Road race, National Road Championships
4th Overall La Tropicale Amissa Bongo
9th Time trial, African Games
2016
National Road Championships

1st Road race
2nd Time trial

2017
2nd Road race, National Road Championships
2018
1st Overall Tour du Sénégal

1st Stage 6

3rd Road race, National Road Championships
2019
2nd Road race, National Road Championships
7th Overall Tour of Good Hope
9th Road race, African Road Championships
2020
1st Road race, National Road Championships
