= Wanjiru Mbugua =

Kenyan Tennis Administrator

Wanjirū Mbūgua-Karani
- Born: 21 June 1974 (age 52); Nairobi, Kenya
- Citizenship: Kenyan
- Education: Daystar University; Bachelor of Arts in Communication; Université Catholique de Louvain; Executive Masters in Sports Organisation Management (MEMOS)
- Occupation: Sport Management
- Known for: Tennis
- Title: President - Tennis Kenya, Team Kenya CEO to the Paris 2024 Olympic Games, Vice President of CAT, and President of Eastern Africa (Zone IV)

Wanjirū Mbūgua-Karani (born 21 Jun 1974) is the President of Tennis Kenya after being elected unopposed on 22 December 2025 in Nairobi, Kenya. She is a former Kenyan Tennis player and captain who until her election as Tennis Kenya President, served as the Secretary-General, Team Kenya CEO to the Paris 2024 Olympic Games, Vice President of Confederation of African Tennis, and President of Eastern Africa (Zone IV).

Wanjirū is also a member of the CAT Women in Sports Commission Committee, and the International Tennis Federation Gender Equality Committee.

== Career ==
Wanjirū is a former Kenya National Champion, and FED Cup team captain, who first ventured into office in July 2011 after being elected a Council Member following a Kenya Lawn Tennis Association election.

In 2015 she was elected the Secretary-General of Tennis Kenya for the first time, a position she retained in the next election in mid-2019.

In January 2023, Wanjirū was named Team Kenya CEO to the Paris 2024 Olympic Games by Kenya's Cabinet Secretary for Sports Ababu Namwamba.

In October 2023, she declared interest in vying for high-profile positions in CAT. Days after the interest, she was elected the vice president of the Confederation of African Tennis (CAT) during the 50th AGM held in Nairobi, Kenya, after seeing off Mahamoud Zayya from Comoros six to five votes in the second round of voting making her the first woman to secure that position. They had tied five votes apiece in the first round. In being voted as the vice president, she automatically became the president of Eastern Africa (Zone IV).

On 22 Dec 2025, Wanjirū succeeded Dr. James Kenani after being elected the new president of Tennis Kenya unopposed during an elective annual general meeting (AGM) in Nairobi.

== Education ==
Wanjirū is a Communication graduate from Daystar University. While pursuing her undergrad, she also attained a Level II Tennis coaching badge.

She holds an Executive Masters in Sport Organizations Management (MEMOS) from Belgium-based Université Catholique de Louvain courtesy of a scholarship from the International Tennis Federation.
