= Nigeria Olympic Committee =

- Country: Nigeria
- Code: NGR
- Created: 26 May 1951; 74 years ago
- Continental Association: ANOCA
- Headquarters: Lagos, Nigeria
- President: Habu Ahmed Gumel
- Secretary General: Tunde Popoola
- Website: nigeriaolympic.org

The Nigeria Olympic Committee (NOC; IOC Code: NGR) is the National Olympic Committee and National Paralympic Committee representing Nigeria, responsible for co-ordinating and supporting Nigerian competitors in the Olympic Games. It is also the body responsible for Nigeria's involvement at the Paralympic Games, Commonwealth Games, Youth Olympic Games and African Games.

== Leadership ==
The President of the NOC as of 2011 was Sani Ndanusa who had been Minister of Sports from 17 December 2008 to 17 March 2010. Ndanusa first said he aspired to become NOC President when he was Minister of Sports, but in November 2009 the NOC screening committee disqualified him on the basis that documents he had submitted were allegedly "forged, altered and not dated". To be eligible for NOC President a candidate has to have served for four years in an executive position in an international sports federation. The NOC said that Ndanusa had not yet served for four years as vice-president of the Confederation of African Tennis, and alleged that his election as President of the Nigeria Tennis Federation was invalid since he did not attend the election.

Ndanusa responded by suspending the incumbent NOC President Habu Gumel from his post as President of the Nigeria Volleyball Federation and setting up a commission of inquiry into the allegations. He was elected in September 2010 to replace former president Habu Gumel, and Tunde Popola was elected as Secretary General with 21 votes against two votes for the incumbent Banji Oladapo. At first, the IOC declared that the election was invalid since the outgoing President and Secretary General of the NOC had not been present. A second election was held at which Ndanusa was the only candidate and the IOC accepted the result.

== Activities ==
Due to a growing number of court cases related to sports in Nigeria, in January 2011 the NOC began the process to establish a local branch of the Court of Arbitration for Sport. Engineer Sani Ndanusa said "We are highly disturbed by the number of court cases in Nigerian sports. If we do not check this ugly incident, Nigerian sports will slide into the valley".

On 5 July 2011, the NOC again delayed inauguration of the new board of the Nigeria Rugby Football Federation (NRFF) when key members of the NRFF board failed to show up. On 14 July 2011 the NOC finally brought together the feuding parties of NRFF, inaugurating a new board. The NOC Scribe, Honourable Tunde Popoola wiped away tears at the ceremony.

Nigeria performed poorly at the September 2011 All Africa Games in Maputo, Mozambique, coming third after South Africa and Egypt. However NOC 1st vice-chairman Jonathan Nnaji said this was due to an arbitrary selection of events by the organiser, excluding sports such as weightlifting, wrestling and power lifting in which Nigeria traditionally excels. He said the results should not be taken as indicating how well the country would perform in the Olympics. In October 2011, the Super Eagles, Nigeria's national football team, was ousted from the 2012 Africa Cup of Nations to be held in Equatorial Guinea and Gabon. Sani Ndanusa, President of the NOC, called for earlier and more intense training to ensure success in future competitions.

== 2012 Olympics ==
In January 2011 the NOC announced that it had chosen Loughborough University as training camps for Team Nigeria prior to the London 2012 Olympic Games, a location that would also be used by the Japanese athletes. In June 2011 the NOC signed a deal for its team to train at the University of Surrey. Speaking at the contract signing ceremony, Ndanusa said Nigeria was ready to confront the World. He said "In the past Olympics, we've been participating but come 2012, we’ll compete with other Nations".

In July 2011 Youdees Integrated Services Limited (YISL) was appointed Official partners of the NOC to manage the 2012 Olympic Games commercial promotions scheme. The marketing consultants were to re-position the organisation and raise funds for the 2012 Games in London. That month a partnership between the Bank of Industry and the Nigeria Olympic Committee was announced. The goal was to exploit all the business opportunities that would be available before, during and after the 2012 London Olympics. The Bank's CEO, Evelyn Oputu, said "The project will provide jobs, expose investment opportunities and create the new image that we want for Nigeria".

In August 2011 the NOC said it had a budget of $220,000 with the goal of obtaining 11 gold medals at the 2012 Olympic Games. The NOC said that 11 athletes would each receive $4,000 every three months in the lead up to the games, and these payments had started the previous month. The athletes were not named, but were drawn from athletics, weightlifting, canoeing and taekwando.

== Affiliations ==
The NOC is affiliated with the International Olympic Committee (IOC) and is a member of the Association of National Olympic Committees (ANOC) and the Association of National Olympic Committees of Africa (ANOCA). Affiliated organisations in Nigeria include:

- Nigeria Amateur Boxing Federation
- Nigeria Amateur Wrestling Federation
- Athletics Federation of Nigeria
- Nigeria Baseball & Softball Federation
- Cycling Federation of Nigeria
- Nigerian Fencing Federation
- Nigeria Football Federation
- Nigeria Gymnastics Federation
- Handball Federation of Nigeria
- Nigeria Hockey Federation
- Nigeria Rugby Football Federation
- Nigeria Table Tennis Association
- Nigeria Taekwondo Federation
- Nigeria Tennis Federation
- Nigeria Weightlifting Federation
- Nigerian Roller Sports Federation
- Nigeria Volleyball Federation
- Nigeria Rowing, Canoe and Sailing Federation

== See also ==
- Nigeria at the Olympics
- Nigeria at the Commonwealth Games
