= List of Nigerian records in track cycling =

Nigerian records in track cycling

The following are the national records in track cycling in Nigeria, maintained by its national cycling federation, Cycling Federation of Nigeria (CFN).

== Men ==
Event	Record	Athlete	Date	Meet	Place	Ref
Flying 200 m time trial						
Flying 500 m time trial						
500 m time trial						
Flying 1 km time trial						
1 km time trial						
Team sprint						
4000 m individual pursuit						
4000 m team pursuit						
Hour record						

== Women ==
Event	Record	Athlete	Date	Meet	Place	Ref
Flying 200 m time trial	11.652	Ese Ukpeseraye	9 August 2024	Olympic Games	Saint-Quentin-en-Yvelines, France	
250 m time trial (standing start)	23.103	Grace Ayuba	3 August 2023	World Championships	Glasgow, United Kingdom	
500 m time trial						
Team sprint	56.368	Grace Ayuba; Tombrapa Grikpa; Ese Ukpeseraye	3 August 2023	World Championships	Glasgow, United Kingdom	
3000 m individual pursuit						
4000 m team pursuit	5:24.549	Tawakalt Yekeen; Treasure Melubari Coxson; Tombrapa Gladys Grikpa; Mary Samuel	12 October 2022	World Championships	Saint-Quentin-en-Yvelines, France	
