= Cricket in Botswana =

Cricket in Botswana was started by expatriates from South Africa and the Indian Subcontinent. The team won the Pepsi ICC Africa World Cricket League in 2008.

== History ==
Cricket was started in Botswana by expatriates from South Africa and the Indian subcontinent. Botswana has started to make strides in the game since becoming an Associate Member of the ICC in 2005.

== Performance ==
Its success in the Pepsi ICC Africa World Cricket League - runners-up in 2006 and winners in 2008 - has paved the way to the international stage.

It has not found life easy since its elevation, however, being relegated from ICC World Cricket League Division Five and Six in successive years, hence its next participation was scheduled for World Cricket League Division Seven in March–April 2011.

== See also ==
- Sports in Botswana
- Botswana cricket team
