= Kingsley Eze Emu =

Nigerian politician

Secretary to the State Government to Delta State
- Incumbent
- Assumed office June 2023
- Preceded by: Patrick Ogoegbunem Ukah

Personal details
- Born: Ika North East Local Government Area of Delta State, Nigeria
- Party: Peoples Democratic Party (Nigeria) (PDP)
- Education: University of Ibadan; Enugu State University of Science and Technology; University of Phoenix
- Occupation: entrepreneur; politician

Kingsley Eze Emu (born December 27, 1959) is a Nigerian banker, financial consultant, entrepreneur, and public servant known for his contributions to both the private and public sectors.

== Early life and education ==
Emu was born in Owanta, a town in the Ika North East Local Government Area of Delta State, Nigeria. Currently serving as the Secretary to the State Government (SSG) to the Governor of Delta State.

== Career ==
Emu began his career in 1989 at the Central Bank of Nigeria (CBN) and subsequently held senior roles at major financial institutions, including Group Merchant Bank, Fidelity Bank, and FinBank PLC, among others. he served as Group Executive for Retail and e-Business at FinBank until his resignation in 2010. Beyond banking, Emu has been involved in ventures such as Benizia Group and Hotel Benizia Ltd.

Emu began his public service career in 2011 with the Delta State Government. He served as Commissioner for Commerce and Industry from 2011 to 2014, contributing to economic policy formulation. From 2015 to 2019, he held the position of Commissioner for Economic Planning, overseeing development initiatives and resource allocation.

Between 2019 and 2023, Emu served as the Chief Economic Adviser to former Delta State Governor Ifeanyi Okowa, In 2023, he was appointed Secretary to the Delta State Government, where he oversees the state's administrative framework and strategic governance.

== Controversy ==
In 2023, a criminal syndicate was apprehended for allegedly impersonating Kingsley Eze Emu to defraud victims of millions of naira. The case highlighted the challenges of identity theft and financial fraud in Nigeria.
