= Charles Barde =

Swiss sports player (1882- 1972)

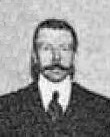
Barde in 1913

Charles Barde (8 Jan 1882, Geneva - 20 May 1972, Geneva) was a Swiss sports player, manager, and judge. He was a special commissioner appointed to determine the rights and claims of Muslims and Jews regarding the Western Wall in 1930.

== Sports ==
In his youth, Charles Barde was team captain for the Genève-Servette Hockey Club and a member of the Swiss ice hockey team during the first European Championships in 1910 and was involved in the development of the Swiss Ice Hockey Federation. A good tennis player at the national level, he was several times vice-champion of Switzerland. With Frenchman Henri Wallet and American Duane Williams he was one of the founders of the “International Lawn Tennis Federation” (renamed the International Tennis Federation in 1977) and served president seven times between 1920 and 1958 (1920, 1927, 1929, 1936, 1939, 1952 & 1958). He was also the president of the Swiss Tennis Federation for several years.

== Law ==
Charles Barde was vice-president of the Court of Justice of Geneva having worked as a magistrate at the cantonal court there. In 1930, he was appointed by the League of Nations as a member of a special commission to determine the rights and claims of Moslems and Jews in connection with the Western Wall. In 1932 he chaired a Romanian-Austrian arbitration tribunal.

== Bibliography ==
1. "Tennis: a Cultural History", Heiner Gillmeister, Leicester University Press, London, 1997, reissued 1998, p.192.
