= African Cycling Confederation =

African bike racing federation

- Type: Sports federation
- Headquarters: Cairo, EGY
- President: (Ivory Coast) Yao Allah-Kouamé
- Parent organization: International Cycling Union
- Website: cac-africa.com

The African Cycling Confederation (Confédération Africaine de Cyclisme), also shortened to CAC, is one of the five continental confederations that are members of the Union Cycliste Internationale (UCI). It is the governing body for cycling in Africa .

CAC is headquartered in Cairo. It was founded in January 1973 during the second All-Africa Games.

One of the association's main tasks is organizing continental championships in the various cycling disciplines. The African Road Cycling Championships have been held since 2005, the African Mountain Bike Championships since 2007, the African BMX Championships since 2014, and the African Track Cycling Championships since 2015.

Dr Mohamed Wagih Azzam served as President from 2005 to 2025. Dr Yao Jean-Marie Allah-Kouamé was elected President on 16 February 2025.

== Presidents ==
President	Country	Years	
...			
Mohamed Wagih Azzam	Egypt	2005	2025
Yao Allah-Kouamé	Ivory Coast	2025	present

== Member federations ==
As of February 2025, the CAC consists of 54 member federations.

Country	Federation
Algeria	Algerian Cycling Federation
Angola	Federação Angolana de Ciclismo
Benin	Fédération Béninoise de Cyclisme
Botswana	Botswana Cycling Association
Burkina Faso	Fédération Burkinabé de Cyclisme
Burundi	Fédération Burundaise de Cyclisme
Cameroon	Fédération Camerounaise de Cyclisme
Cape Verde	Federação Caboverdiana de Ciclismo
Central African Republic	Fédération Centrafricaine de Cyclisme
Chad	Fédération Tchadienne du cyclisme
Comoros	Fédération Comorienne de Cyclisme
Democratic Republic of the Congo	Fédération Congolaise de Cyclisme
Djibouti	Fédération Djiboutienne de Cyclisme
Egypt	Egyptian Cycling Federation
Equatorial Guinea	Federación Ciclista de Guinea Ecuatorial
Eritrea	Eritrean National Cycling Federation
Eswatini	Eswatini Cycling Association
Ethiopia	National Ethiopian Cycling Federation
Gabon	Fédération Gabonaise De Cyclisme
Gambia	Gambia Cycling Association
Ghana	Ghana Cycling Federation
Guinea	Fédération Guinéenne De Cyclisme
Guinea-Bissau	Federação de Ciclismo da Guiné-Bissau
Ivory Coast	Fédération Ivoirienne de Cyclisme
Kenya	Kenya Cycling Federation
Lesotho	Lesotho Cycling Association
Liberia	Liberia National Cycling Association
Libya	Libyan Cycling Federation
Madagascar	Fédération Malgache de Cyclisme
Malawi	Cycling Association of Malawi
Mali	Fédération Malienne de Cyclisme
Mauritania	Fédération Mauritanienne de Cyclisme
Mauritius	Fédération Mauricienne de Cyclisme
Morocco	Fédération Royale Marocaine de Cyclisme
Mozambique	Federação de Ciclismo de São Tomé e Principe
Namibia	Namibian Cycling Federation
Niger	Fédération Nigérienne de Cyclisme
Nigeria	Cycling Federation of Nigeria
Republic of the Congo	Fédération Congolaise de Cyclisme
Rwanda	Fédération Rwandaise de Cyclisme
São Tomé and Príncipe	Federação de Ciclismo de São Tomé e Principe
Senegal	Fédération Sénégalaise de Cyclisme
Seychelles	Union Cycliste des Seychelles
Sierra Leone	Sierra Leone National Cycling Association
Somalia	Somali Cycling Federation
South Africa	Cycling South Africa
South Sudan	South Sudan Cycling Federation
Sudan	Sudan Cycling Federation
Tanzania	Cycling Association of Tanzania
Togo	Fédération Togolaise de Cyclisme
Tunisia	Fédération tunisienne de cyclisme
Uganda	Uganda Cycling Association
Zambia	Cycling Association of Zambia
Zimbabwe	Zimbabwe Cycling Federation

== Tournaments ==
- African Road Cycling Championships
- African Mountain Bike Championships
- African BMX Championships
- African Track Cycling Championships
