= Sport in Botswana =

Sports in Botswana is diverse and reasonably well-developed. Though football, netball and athletics remain the most popular sports, numerous other sports, including cricket, rugby, judo, swimming and tennis are actively followed in the country. The Botswana National Sport Commission (BNSC), together with the Botswana National Olympic Committee (BNOC) and Ministry of Youth, Sport and Culture (MYSC) are responsible for the overall management of sport in the country. In addition, there are over 30 National Sport Federations (NSFs) and three school sport federations.

Botswana stages the Botswana Games every two years, and has hosted the 2014 African Youth Games, International Working Group on Women in Sport, and the 2017 Netball World Youth Cup. They also bid to host the 2022 Summer Youth Olympics, but lost to eventual host Dakar.

== Sporting codes ==
=== Athletics ===
==== Running ====
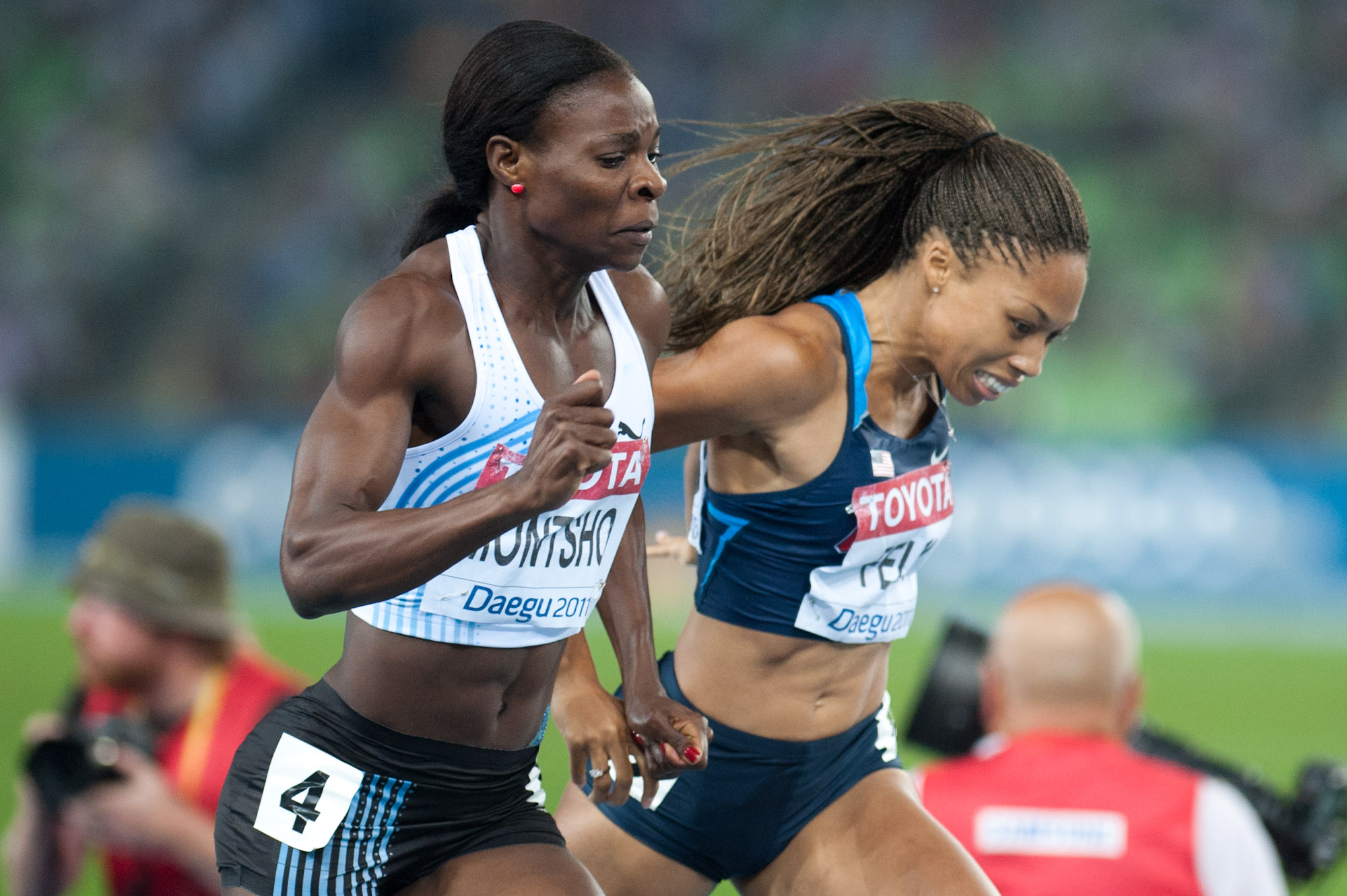
Amantle Montsho narrowly defeated Alyson Felix to become Botswana's first World or Olympic track and field champion in 2011.

Botswana has been doing well in athletics looking at the works of Nijel Amos winning a silver medal in the men's 800 m race, the first Olympic medal for his country. At the 2014 Commonwealth Games, Amos won the 800 meter gold medal in 1:45.18. In the tactical affair, Amos maneuvered out of a box to pass World Record holder David Rudisha in the last 50 meters. Botswana also has a good athlete Amantle Montsho who has won the silver medal at the 2006 African Championships and the gold medal representing the country at the 2007 All-Africa Games. At the same Games she also finished fifth in the 200 metres. She ran a personal best and Botswana record of 49.83 seconds to win the 400 metres at the 2008 African Championships in Athletics. It remains the Championship record for the event. At the 2011 World Championships in Athletics in South Korea, she narrowly beat Alyson Felix to become Botswana's first World or Olympic track and field champion.

Letsile Tebogo is a sprinter who specializes in the 100 m and 200 m. He became the first African athlete to run under 20 seconds in the 200 m at the World Athletics U20 Championships, where he also set multiple junior records. Recently in the 2024 Summer Olympics, he won the men’s 200 metres gold in Paris, clocking 19.46 seconds (an African record) to become Botswana’s first ever Olympic gold medallist.

==== High jump ====
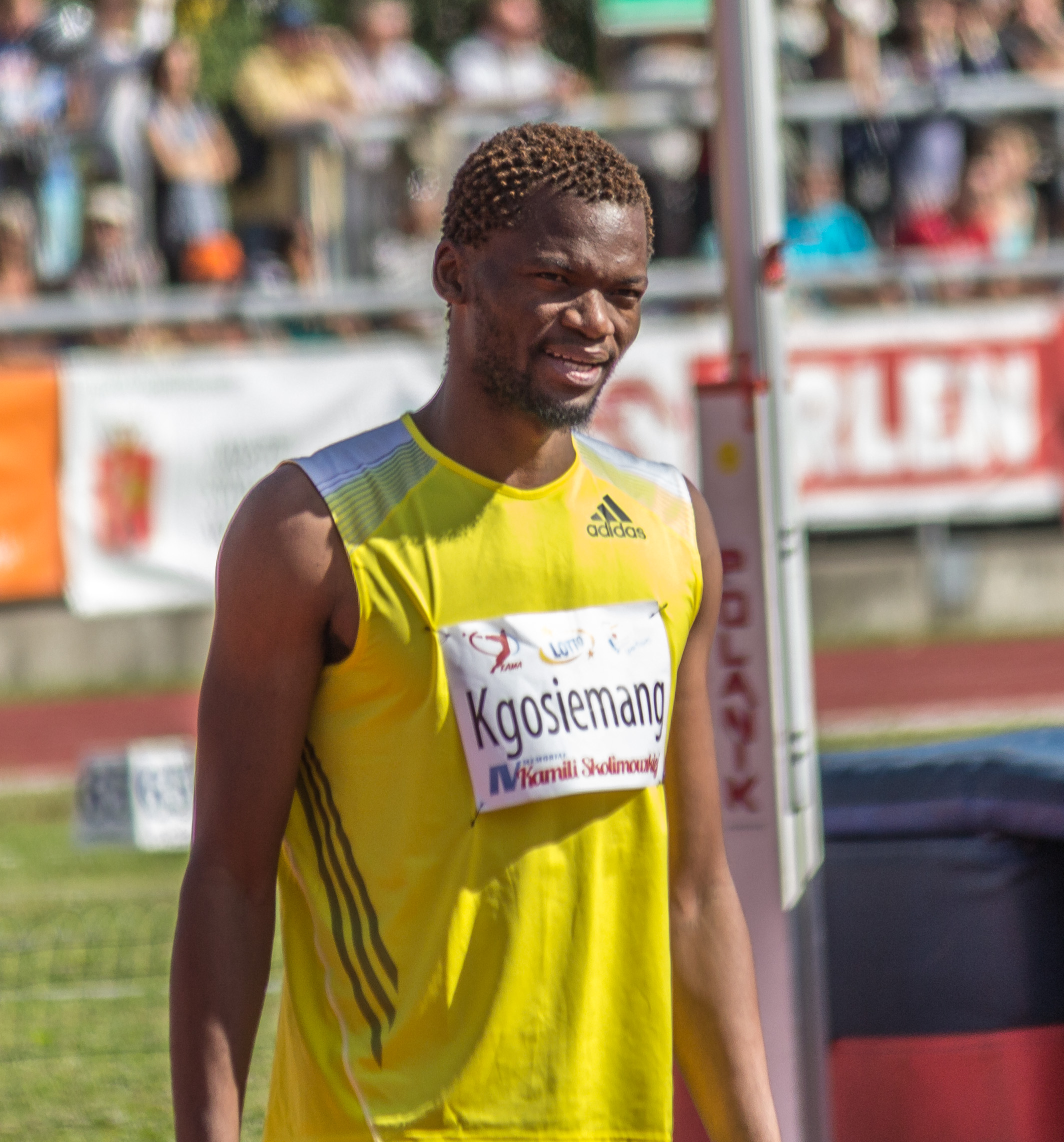
Kabelo Kgosiemang - Memoriał Kamili Skolimowskiej 2013

Another famous Botswana athlete is high jumper Kabelo Kgosiemang, three times African champion.

=== Basketball ===
The Botswana national basketball team is the national basketball team of Botswana and is also a member of the International Basketball Federation (FIBA) since 1997. The squad has not yet made appearances at the FIBA World Championship, FIBA Africa Championship or Basketball at the Summer Olympics

=== Bridge ===
The card game bridge has a strong following; it was first played in Botswana over 30 years ago and grew in popularity during the 1980s. Many British expatriate school teachers informally taught the game in Botswana's secondary schools. The Botswana Bridge Federation (BBF) was founded in 1988 and continues to organise tournaments. Bridge has remained popular and the BBF has over 800 members. In 2007, the BBF invited the English Bridge Union to host a week-long teaching program in May 2008.

=== Cricket ===
Cricket was started in the country by expatriates from South Africa and the Indian subcontinent. Botswana was elected to the ICC as an affiliate member in 2001, and played in the Africa Cup in Zambia the following year. After winning all their first round matches against Namibia, Tanzania, Zambia and Zimbabwe, they beat Kenya in the semi-final before losing by 270 runs to South Africa in the final.

In March 2004, they won the African affiliates qualifying tournament for the 2005 ICC Trophy, qualifying them for the next stage of qualification, the Africa Cricket Association Championships. They beat Nigeria and Tanzania in that tournament in Zambia in August, finishing fourth, thus missing out on qualification for their first ICC Trophy. They were rewarded for their performance in this tournament by being promoted to associate membership of the ICC in 2005.

In 2006, they took part in Division Two of the African region of the World Cricket League, finishing second behind Tanzania. This qualified them for Division Five of the World Cricket League.

In May 2008, Botswana travelled to Jersey to take part in the Division Five tournament. Although Botswana beat the Bahamas in Group B, it was their only group stage win and with three losses and one match abandoned due to rain they failed to make the semi-finals. Botswana finished sixth overall after defeating Germany but losing to Singapore in positional playoff matches. With only the top two from this tournament qualifying for Division Four in Tanzania later in the year, Botswana missed out on the chance to take their 2011 World Cup dream any further. In October 2008, Botswana took part in Division Two of the African region of the World Cricket League, finishing unbeaten and winning the tournament. This victory promoted them to Division One of the Africa Region, however the date and venue for this tournament is still to be determined.

In August 2009, Botswana travelled to Singapore to participate in Division Six of the World Cricket League. Despite being competitive in most of their games, Botswana won only one of five group matches and finished fifth after beating Norway in a positional playoff.

In May 2011, Botswana hosted the ICC World Cricket League Division Seven with a young squad and performed admirably well, winning three league stage matches against Norway, Japan and Germany but losing out to eventual champions Kuwait, 2nd placed Nigeria and finally Germany in the placing match. The match versus Nigeria in the league stages was to decide which of the 2 nations would progress to the ICC World Cricket League Division Six to be held in Malaysia in September 2011 and by losing that match, Botswana failed to progress and will remain in Division Seven till the next instalment of the ICC WCL.

In April 2013, Botswana were given hosting rights again for the ICC World Cricket League Division 7 in their second attempt in trying to get promoted out of Division 7 after halting the relegation slide in the last edition. Beating Ghana in the first match, Botswana lost their second match in a competitive encounter against Vanuatu by 23 runs. Botswana then lost third next match heavily to eventual WCL Div 7 winners and arch rivals Nigeria. Botswana tried in vain to get back into contention for promotion but after a tied match against Germany, all hopes were dashed and the best they could hope for was a 3rd-place finish. This was achieved by beating Fiji in the last group match and then beating them again in the 3rd place playoff earning Botswana a respectable 3rd place, finishing behind Vanuatu and Nigeria who were both promoted to Division 6 of the WCL. With ICC's decision to eliminate the ICC World Cricket League Divisions 7 and 8, this meant that Botswana will now have to qualify through regional tournaments to make it into the ICC World Cricket League Division 6, which will now be the entry point for the World Cricket League.

=== Football ===
Football is the most popular sport in Botswana, with qualification for the 2012 Africa Cup of Nations being the biggest achievement to date. The Botswana national football team, governed by the Botswana Football Association, is popularly known as The Zebras and represents the country in international football competitions. It was founded in 1970, and affiliated to FIFA in 1978 and to CAF in 1976. The Botswana Football Association organizes national football leagues and the national team which include the beMOBILE Premier League, Botswana First Division North and Botswana First Division South.

Although Botswana have entered the FIFA World Cup preliminary stages five times, it took them nearly 11 years after playing their first match to register their first victory - a 4–1 victory in the African pre-preliminary qualifying rounds for Germany 2006 against Lesotho

The southern African nation took part in their first preliminary competition for the 1994 FIFA World Cup in the USA, where they faced Niger and Côte d'Ivoire. They managed a 0–0 draw with the latter in Gaborone but lost their other three matches, finishing last in their group.

The next competition they entered was for 2002 FIFA World Cup, where they faced Zambia in a two-legged tie to decide which team would advance to the group stages. Zambia won both legs of the tie to qualify and knock Botswana out.

After this Botswana suffered some poor results with the team losing 3–0 to Zambia and losing to second-string sides from South Africa and Zimbabwe at home in Gaborone, frustrating many supporters. A draw with a Madagascar side ranked 146th in the world at the time led Botswana FA to sack manager Colwyn Rowe, despite his leading Botswana to their then-highest ever FIFA ranking of 95th. The BFA claimed this move was taken because they feared for his safety from angry fans. Stanley Tshosane was named as his replacement and in his first game in charge, Botswana achieved an impressive 2–1 win away to Mozambique to put them in a relatively strong position in their qualifying group. Despite also achieving a creditable draw with Côte d'Ivoire, Botswana finished bottom of their qualifying group for the 2010 FIFA World Cup in South Africa.

This disappointment was followed by the most successful period in Botswana's history. Botswana defied their ranking to become the first team to qualify for the 2012 Africa Cup of Nations, beating Tunisia both at home and away. This success coincided with a rise to their highest ever FIFA ranking of 53rd. They did not manage to build upon this upturn in form at the tournament, losing narrowly to Ghana and Mali and heavily to Guinea to finish bottom of their group with zero points.

The truncated qualification format for 2013 Africa Cup of Nations saw them face Mali in a two-legged tie, which they lost 7–1 on aggregate. They then failed to qualify for the 2014 FIFA World Cup, finishing third in their group with 7 points behind South Africa and Ethiopia.

In October 2013 the Botswana Football Association sacked Tshosane, citing his "failing to meet the targets set for him". They subsequently appointed Englishman Peter Butler in February 2014.

=== Motorsport ===
The Kalahari Botswana 1000 Desert Race is a desert race held since 1981. It is the premier event of the South African Rally Cross Country Series.

=== Golf ===
The Botswana Golf Union offers an amateur golf league in which golfers compete in tournaments and championships.

=== Rugby ===
The Botswana team played their first ever international on September 7, 1996, against Zimbabwe, losing 130 to 10. Their first win came in 2001 in a match against Swaziland, winning 13 points to 3. Also in 2001 they participated in African qualifying tournaments for the 2003 Rugby World Cup in Australia. In 2004 Botswana won four internationals in a row, defeating Tanzania, Swaziland, Nigeria and Mali.

Botswana then participated in the Africa qualifying tournaments for the 2007 Rugby World Cup in France. They were grouped in the Southern Pool of Round 1a, along with nations Zambia and Swaziland. In their first game against Zambia in Lusaka, they lost 28 to 24. However they won their second match 19 to 12 over Swaziland in Botswana. They finished second in the pool and did not advance to the next round. Rugby union in Botswana has 6,805 registered players. However, Botswana's proximity to the major Rugby playing nation of South Africa, and 2 time world cup competitors Zimbabwe, has meant that Botswana has received a constant flow of touring sides, and other African nations.

=== Squash ===
The Botswana Squash Rackets Association is the national organisation for Squash in Botswana and its regional affiliation is Squash Federation of Africa. The Botswana Squash Rackets Association is currently being represented internationally by Alister Walker, Lekgotla Mosope, Jason Boyle and Theo Pelonomi.

=== Swimming ===
The Botswana Swimming Sport Association is the national governing body for the sport of swimming in Botswana.

=== Tennis ===
Botswana has, over the last couple of years, remained ranked in the top ten in Africa in junior tennis. Presently the highest ranked player is No. 3 in Africa in the 16 & under age group. The Botswana Tennis Association has a junior development program aimed at developing tennis at grassroots. This program receives support from the BNSC, ITF and other stakeholders, and the funds they provide are used to carry out this program. This program has been spread throughout the country to several primary schools.

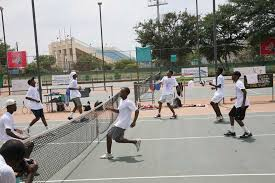
Botswana Junior Tennis Team training for their next games

== See also ==
- Botswana at the Olympics
- Botswana National Sports Council
