= Botswana National Sport Commission =

Botswana National Sports Commission
- Sport: Athletics; Badminton; Basketball; Bowling; Boxing; Bridge; Chess; Cricket; Cycling; Darts; Football; Golf; Gyminastics; Handball; Hockey; Horse Society; Karate; Motor Sport; Netball; Rugby; Softball; Squash; Swimming; Table Tennis; Taekwando; Tennis; Weightlifting; Wrestling
- Abbreviation: (BNSC)
- Location: Gaborone, Botswana
- CEO: Olebile Sikwane

Official website
- www.bnsc.co.bw
- (Botswana)

Botswana National Sports Commission is the national governing body for all sports in Botswana.

== See also ==
- Sports in Botswana
- Botswana National Olympic Committee(BNOC)
- Botswana Tennis Association
- Botswana national football team
- Botswana Cycling Association
