= Carel Joseph van Kempen =

Dutch politician (1872–1955)

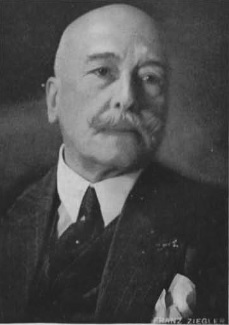

Carel Joseph van Kempen (Zierikzee, 18 March 1872 – The Hague, 25 November 1955) was a Dutch politician.

He was the son of merchant Willem van Kempen and Robina Johanna Ochtman. His brother, Jac. van Kempen, became an oratorio singer.

He attended the Hogere Burgerschool in Zierikzee and studied at the Indisch Instituut in Delft and at the Dutch East Indies Administrative Academy.

Van Kempen began his career as a Dutch East Indies civil servant and advanced through all administrative ranks to become the governor of Sumatra's East Coast Residency.

In 1929, he was elected as a member of the House of Representatives for the Liberal State Party. In 1930, he was part of the International Commission for the Wailing Wall established by the British government with the approval of the League of Nations to address the conflicts between Jews and Muslims regarding access to the Wailing Wall. He had to resign his membership in 1931 due to illness but returned to parliament in 1933. He was his party's spokesperson on colonial matters and was regarded as a knowledgeable spokesperson with conservative views on colonial issues.

Van Kempen stepped down as a member of parliament in 1946.
