= Nigeria Weightlifting Federation =

Governing body for Weightlifting in Nigeria

- Sport: Weightlifting
- Abbreviation: NWF
- Founded: 1963
- Affiliation: International Weightlifting Federation
- Regional affiliation: Weightlifting Federation of Africa
- Headquarters: Abuja, Nigeria
- President: Dr Ibrahim Abdul
- Secretary: Emmanuel Okere

Official website
- nigeriaweightliftingfederation.org
- (Nigeria)

The Nigeria Weightlifting Federation, otherwise known as NWF, is the national governing body that oversees the sport of weightlifting in Nigeria. Formed in 1963, the federation is a member of the International Weightlifting Federation and Commonwealth Weightlifting Federation.

Nigerian Weightlifters in Uzbekistan 2021

The Nigerian team won four of the 10 gold medals in the Commonwealth playoffs, two silver and three bronze medals at the World Championships. “Stella Kingsley competing in the 50 kg won the gold medal in her category. “Adijat Olarinoye won a gold medal in the Commonwealth qualifiers and a silver medal in the World Championships and two bronze medals in the 59 kg. “Joy Eze competed in the 71 kg category, won a gold medal, and also won silver at the World Championships. Team coach Helen Idahosa, a 2000 Olympian super heavyweight athlete, said she knew the game and knew what it takes to motivate a lifter to do their best. “I know what it takes to motivate an athlete during competition and that’s what I did,” he said. .

== See more ==
- Nigerian Olympic Committee
