= Egyptian Tennis Federation =

National tennis organization of Egypt

- Sport: Tennis
- Abbreviation: (ETF)
- Founded: 1920
- Affiliation: International Tennis Federation
- Regional affiliation: Confederation of African Tennis
- Location: Cairo, Egypt
- President: Ismail ElShafei

Official website
- www.egypttennis.com
- (Egypt)

The Egyptian Tennis Federation (Arabic: الاتحاد المصري للتنس, ETF) is an organisation set up in 1920 that takes charge of the organisation, co-ordination and promotion of tennis in Egypt. It is recognised by the International Tennis Federation and Confederation of African Tennis on region (African) basis. Its headquarters are at Cairo. It was founded under the name Egypt Tennis Federation then Tennis United Arab Republic Federation until it changed to the Egyptian Tennis Federation in 1976. The roles of the FFT include organising tennis competitions in Egypt, supporting and co-ordinating tennis clubs, and managing the Egyptian tennis teams, organizing local tournaments including their Davis Cup and Fed Cup teams.
