= Africa Tennis Nations Cup =

African senior tennis tournament

- Status: active
- Genre: sports event
- Date: midyear
- Frequency: annual
- Inaugurated: 1973
- Organiser: Confederation of African Tennis (CAT)

The Africa Tennis Nations Cup is a tennis competition organized by the Confederation of African Tennis, which held its 16th edition in 2021 and is set to return for its 17th edition in 2026.

== Results ==
=== African Senior Champions ===
==== Single's Champions ====
| Year | Men's Champion | Men's Runner-up | Women's Champion | Women's Runner-up |
|---|---|---|---|---|
| 1973 | (Nigeria) Thompson Onibokun | | (Kenya) Jane Davies-Doxzon | |
| 2005 | (Algeria) Lamine Ouahab | (Tunisia) Malek Jaziri | (Tunisia) Selima Sfar | (Morocco) Bahia Mouhtassine |
| 2006 | (Algeria) Slimane Saoudi | (Morocco) Mehdi Ziadi | (Morocco) Bahia Mouhtassine | (Algeria) Samia Medjahdi |
| 2007 | (Algeria) Lamine Ouahab | (Morocco) Yassine Idmbarek | (Morocco) Lamia Essaadi | (Morocco) Habiba Ifrakh |
| 2008 | (Egypt) Sherif Sabry | (Morocco) Mehdi Ziadi | (Morocco) Lamia Essaadi | (Morocco) Fatima El Allami |
| 2009 | (Tunisia) Malek Jaziri | (Tunisia) Haithem Abid | (Morocco) Fatima El Allami | (Tunisia) Ons Jabeur |
| 2010 | (Egypt) Mohamed Safwat | (Tunisia) Malek Jaziri | (Morocco) Fatima El Allami | (Morocco) Lina Bennani |
| 2012 | (Egypt) Mohamed Safwat | (Egypt) Sherif Sabry | (Tunisia) Ons Jabeur | (Egypt) Mai El Kamash |
| 2014 | (Democratic Republic of the Congo) Denis Indondo Ilongembe | (Burkina Faso) Joël Meda | (Cameroon) Catina Johnson Gamo Kamdem | (Cameroon) Flore-Jeannette Mamo |
| 2016 | (Morocco) Amine Ahouda | (Tunisia) Moez Echargui | (Tunisia) Chiraz Bechri | (Morocco) Rita Atik |
| 2018 | (Morocco) Anas Fattar | (Zimbabwe) Mehluli Don Ayanda Sibanda | (Tunisia) Chiraz Bechri | (Kenya) Angela Okutoyi |
| 2021 | (Tunisia) Skander Mansouri | (Tunisia) Aziz Dougaz | (Egypt) Sandra Samir | |

==== Doubles Champions ====
| Year | Men's Champion | Men's Runner-up | Women's Champion | Women's Runner-up |
|---|---|---|---|---|
| 2005 | (Algeria) Lamine Ouahab; Abdelhak Hameurlaine | (Tunisia) Malek Jaziri; Fares Zaier | (South Africa) Alicia Pillay; Lizaan Du Plessis | (Morocco) Bahia Mouhtassine; Habiba Ifrakh |
| 2006 | (Morocco) Anas Fattar; Mehdi Ziadi | (Algeria) Slimane Saoudi; Abdelhak Hameurlaine | (Madagascar) Natacha Randriantefy; Seheno Razafindramaso | (Mauritius) Marinne Giraud; Astrid Tixier |
| 2007 | (Morocco) Rabie Chaki; Reda El Amrani | (Morocco) | (Morocco) Lamia Essaadi; Fatima El Allami | (Morocco) |
| 2008 | (Egypt) Sherif Sabry; Karim Maamoun | (Tunisia) Malek Jaziri; Heithem Abid | (Morocco) Fatima El Allami; Nadia Lalami | (Morocco) Habiba Ifrakh; Lina Bennani |
| 2008 | (Morocco) Reda El Amrani; Rabie Chaki | (Tunisia) Malek Jaziri; Heithem Abid | (Morocco) Fatima El Allami; Nadia Lalami | (Egypt) Ola Abou Zekry; Rana Sherif Ahmed |
| 2010 | (Egypt) Mohamed Safwat; Karim Maamoun | (Morocco) Yassine Idembarek (Egypt) Mohamed Maamoun | (Morocco) Fatima El Allami; Lina Bennani | (Egypt) Ola Abou Zekry; Magy Aziz |
| 2012 | (Egypt) Mohamed Safwat; Sherif Sabry | (Morocco) Mehdi Ziadi; Younes Rachidi | (Morocco) Fatima El Allami; Nadia Lalami | (Egypt) Mai El Kamash; Sandra Samir |
| 2014 | (Democratic Republic of the Congo) Denis Indondo Ilongembe; Bessombi Toubi | (Cameroon) Augustin Ntouba; Étienne Teboh | (Cameroon) Catina Johnson Gamo Kamdem; Caroline Axelle Nguié | (Cameroon) Carine Mago; Flore Mamo |
| 2016 | (Tunisia) Mohamed Ali Bellanouna; Moez Echargui | (Kenya) Ismael Mzai Changawa; Ibrahim Kibet Yego | (Morocco) Rita Atik; Diae El Jardi | (Tunisia) Ferdaous Bahri; Chiraz Bechri |
| 2018 | (Morocco) Amine Ahouda; Anas Fattar | (Kenya) Ismael Mzai Changawa; Ibrahim Kibet Yego | (Tunisia) Ferdaous Bahri; Chiraz Bechri | (Morocco) Lina Qostal (Tunisia) Mouna Bouzgarrou |
| 2021 | (Tunisia) Skander Mansouri; Aziz Dougaz | (Tunisia) Wissam Abderrahmane (Algeria) Mohamed Amine Aissa-Khalifa | | |

==== Team Champions ====
| Year | Men's Champion | Men's Runner-up | Women's Champion | Women's Runner-up |
|---|---|---|---|---|
| 2008 | (Morocco) Mehdi Ziadi; Talal Ouahabi; Reda El Amrani | (Egypt) Sherif Sabry; Karim Maamoun | (Morocco) Fatima El Allami; Lamia Essaadi; Nadia Lalami | (Tunisia) Ons Jabeur; Nour Abbès; Sonia Daggou |
| 2009 | (Morocco) Reda El Amrani; Rabie Chaki; Yassine Idembarek | (Tunisia) Malek Jaziri; Heithem Abid; Ahmed Triki | (Tunisia) Ons Jabeur; Nour Abbès; Sonia Daggou | (Morocco) Fatima El Allami; Nadia Lalami; Lina Bennani |
| 2010 | (Egypt) Mohamed Safwat; Karim Maamoun; Karim Mohamed Maamoun | (Tunisia) Malek Jaziri; Slim Hamza; Ameur Ben Hassen | (Morocco) Fatima El Allami; Lina Bennani | (Egypt) Magy Aziz; Ola Abou Zekry |
| 2012 | (Egypt) Mohamed Safwat; Sherif Sabry; Karim Maamoun | (Morocco) Mehdi Ziadi; Younes Rachidi; Yassine Idembarek | (Tunisia) Ons Jabeur; Nour Abbès; Sonia Daggou | (Morocco) Fatima El Allami; Nadia Lalami; Lina Qostal |
| 2014 | (Democratic Republic of the Congo) Denis Indondo Ilongembe; Bessombi Toubi; Arnold Ikondo | (Ivory Coast) Gueninle Abdoul Karim Ouattara; Kouadio Guillaume Koffi | | |
| 2016 | (Morocco) Amine Ahouda; Mehdi Jdi; Yassine Idmbarek | (Tunisia) | (Morocco) Diae El Jardi; Rita Atik; Lilya Hadab | (Tunisia) |
| 2018 | (Morocco) Amine Ahouda Anas Fettar | (Kenya) Diae Jardi Oumaima Aziz | (Morocco) | (Tunisia) |
| 2021 | (Tunisia) Mohamed Amine Aissa-Khalifa | (Egypt) | (Egypt) | (Algeria) |

==== Mixed Team ====
| Year | Champion | Runner-up |
|---|---|---|
| 2005 | (Tunisia) Malek Jaziri; Wael Kilani; Selima Sfar; Olfa Dhaoui | (Algeria) Lamine Ouahab; Abdelhak Hameurlaine; Samia Medjahdi; Assia Halo |
| 2006 | (Morocco) Mehdi Ziadi; Anas Fattar; Fatima El Allami; Bahia Mouhtassine | (Algeria) Slimane Saoudi; Abdelhak Hameurlaine; Samia Medjahdi; Sarah Meghoufel |
| 2007 | (Morocco) Reda El Amrani; Lamia Essaadi; Rabie Chaki; Fatima El Allami | (Algeria) Lamine Ouahab; Abdelhak Hameurlaine; Samia Medjahdi; Yassmine El Kaima |
