= Festus Porbeni =

Nigerian naval officer and politician

Rear Admiral (retired) Festus Bikepre Igbeyinadun Porbeni

Minister of Transport
- In office 1998–1999
- President: Abdulsalami Abubakar

Personal details
- Profession: Naval officer, diplomat, politician

Festus Bikepre Igbeyinadun Porbeni, CFR is a Nigerian retired naval officer, politician, and sports administrator.

== Background and personal life ==
Porbeni was born in May 1946 in Aduku, Bayelsa State, Nigeria. He married Gladys Dubling-Green in 1974; the couple had two sons and two daughters. Gladys Dubling-Green is now deceased.

== Education ==
Festus attended Ereko Methodist Primary School, from 1951 to 1959, Hussy College Warri from 1963 to 1964 and Government College Ughelli from 1965 to 1966.

In 1967, he was enlisted in the Nigerian Navy and graduated from the Nigerian Defence Academy, Kaduna, where he was rated best in service subjects in the 3rd Regular Course. He proceeded to Sub-Lieutenant Technical Course Institute, Venderthy Cochia, India in1970. He completed Deep Sea Diving Course in Port Harcourt in 1972, followed by a Seamanship Course at the Royal Navy Seamanship School, Portsmouth, England in 1973. Fetus completed a Navigation Specialist Course in India in 1975. In 1979 he attended the Command Staff College Jaji and graduated in 1980.

== Career ==
=== Naval career ===
In 1971, He was appointed as Executive Officer, NNS Enugu, and Commanding Officer of NNS Argungu in 1974, and was redeployed as Pioneer Officer in-charge of Naval Training School, Port Harcourt in 1976. He became Navigational Officer and First Lieutenant in 1977, and in 1978 NNS Obuma and Commanding Officer, NNS Ruwan Yaro, and was appointed as Executive Officer, NNS Akaso in the same year. In 1979 he became the Flotilla Operations Officer.

Porbeni served as Pioneer Base Commander, Naval College Onne, Port Harcourt in 1980 and in the same promoted to the Naval Headquarters as Director of Naval Operations. By 1982 he was the Staff Officer 1, Director of Training and Personnel, Defence Headquarters, Lagos. He was a Commandant of the Nigerian Naval College, and Director of Research and Analytical Studies at the Nigerian War College.

=== Diplomatic and political career ===
Porbeni served as the Pioneer Defence Adviser to Nigeria in Malabo, Equatorial Guinea, and later as Resident Ambassador to Equatorial Guinea with accreditation to Cameroon, Gabon, and São Tomé and Príncipe from 1982 to 1988.

He was appointed Minister of Transport during the transitional government of General Abdulsalami Abubakar, serving from 1998 until the return to civilian rule in 1999.

=== Sports administration ===
Porbeni has been active in sports governance. He served as President of the Nigeria Rowing, Canoe and Sailing Federation (NRCSF) and as Vice President of the Confederation of African Canoeing (CAC).

He has supported the hosting of major continental canoe sprint championships.

=== Later roles ===
After retirement from active service, Porbeni entered business and served in corporate roles, including as a non-executive director for Mutual Benefits Assurance Plc. He also held the position of Honorary Consul of Romania to the Niger Delta Region.

== Honours and awards ==
- Member of the Nautical Institute, London
- Forces Staff Medal (Nigeria)
- Medal of Equatorial Guinea Military Merit, Second Class

== See also ==
- Nigerian Navy
- National Institute for Policy and Strategic Studies
