= The ITF Year =

Yearbook of the ITF

The ITF Year is the official yearbook of the International Tennis Federation (ITF). It replaced World of Tennis, edited by John Barrett as the ITF's official tennis annual. Its first edition, The ITF Year 2001, described the activities of the ITF in 2001 but was published in January 2002. All subsequent editions have also detailed events in the year following the date in the title, and have been published in the January of the following year, usually around the time of the Australian Open. The book was edited by Joanne Sirman in the 2001 and 2002 editions, Mitzi Ingram Evans from 2003 until 2012, and Jamie Renton from 2013 until 2016. The yearbook was discontinued in 2017.

The front covers of the books depict slightly blurred images of a tennis player or doubles team.

== Players who have appeared on the cover ==
- 2001: Lleyton Hewitt
- 2002: Amélie Mauresmo
- 2003: Yevgeny Kafelnikov
- 2004: Anastasia Myskina
- 2005: Roger Federer
- 2006: Yan Zi and Zheng Jie
- 2007: Filippo Volandri
- 2008: Rafael Nadal
- 2009:
- 2010: Esther Vergeer
- 2011: Novak Djokovic
- 2012: Serena Williams
- 2013: Andy Murray
- 2014:
- 2015: Serena Williams
- 2016: Andy Murray
