= Botswana Tennis Association =

Tennis organization in Botswana

- Sport: Tennis
- Abbreviation: (BoTA)
- Affiliation: International Tennis Federation
- Regional affiliation: Confederation of African Tennis
- Location: Gaborone, Botswana
- President: Mr Oaitse Thipe
- Coach: Wellington Sibanda

Official website
- bnsc.co.bw
- (Botswana)

The Botswana Tennis Association (BTA) is the national governing body for the sport of tennis in Botswana. Botswana is ranked in the top 15 nations in African tennis. The BoTA is affiliated to both International Tennis Federation and Confederation of African Tennis.

== History ==
Botswana competed in its first Fed Cup in 1995. Their best result was fourth place in its Group II pool in 2002 and 2003. Tapiwa Marobela has recorded the highest number of wins for the Botswana Fed Cup team, six wins from 13 singles matches and two wins from 11 doubles matches between 2001 and 2004, before she attended Florida State University from 2004 to 2008. Botswana competed in its first Davis Cup in 1996. Botswana Tennis Association also participated in 2014 African Youth Games held in Gaborone, Botswana.

There are thirteen tennis clubs affiliated to the association. The association collaborates with such institutions as Botswana Integrated Sports Association (Body for Secondary Schools’ sports), Botswana Premier League Sports Association (body for tertiary institutions’ sports, primary schools), etc.

== Davis Cup ==
Botswana Davis Cup team qualified in February 2005 for Group III after being relegated in 2002 from Group III where they had been for two years.

Botswana Davis Cup Team
Year	Players
2009	Matshidiso Malope; Thabiso Shatiso Mabaka; Shingirai Muzondiwa; Lefa Ashley Mthandazo Sixtus Sibanda
2010	Shingirai Muzondiwa; Thabiso Shatiso Mabaka; Lefa Ashley Mthandazo Sixtus Sibanda; Bakang Duke Mosinyi
2013	Phenyo Matong; Shingirai Muzondiwa; Innocent Tidimane (junior player); Aobakwe Lekang
2014	Phenyo Matong; Shingirai Muzondiwa; Thabiso Shatiso Mabaka; Lame Botshoma

== Human resources ==
- Coaches
  Fifteen (15) ITF Level I coaches have been trained through the cooperation between the ITF and the International Olympic Committee (IOC).
- Officials
  The association has one ITF Level II (White Badge) umpire and over forty Level I umpires.
- Other volunteers include sports physicians who are called occasionally to assist at selected events, particularly international competitions.

== See also ==
- Sport in Botswana
- Botswana National Sports Council
