= Nigerian Fencing Federation =

- Sport: Fencing
- Jurisdiction: Nigeria
- Founded: 1997
- Affiliation: FIE
- Regional affiliation: CAE
- Headquarters: Lagos, Nigeria
- President: Adeyinka Samuel

Official website
- nigerianfencing.com
- (Nigeria)

The Nigerian Fencing Federation is the governing body that regulates and oversee the Olympic sport of fencing in Nigeria. Affiliated to the Nigeria Olympic Committee, the body is responsible for organizing fencing competitions locally and selecting fencers for international competitions.

== See more ==
- Nigeria Olympic Committee
