= World of Tennis =

World of Tennis was the International Tennis Federation's (ITF) official tennis annual until it was replaced by The ITF Year. It was published annually beginning in 1969 and became an official ITF publication in 1981. World of Tennis was edited by John Barrett and from 1970 to 1990 compiled by Lance Tingay. Its final edition was World of Tennis 2001, describing the ITF's activities in 2000.

== The list of published books ==
1. Year Book of World Tennis (describing year 1968) – 272 pages, Rod Laver on cover page
2. Year Book of World Tennis 1970 (describing year 1969) – 288 pages, Rod Laver on cover page
3. World of Tennis '71 (describing year 1970) – 320 pages, Ken Rosewall on cover page
4. World of Tennis '72 (describing year 1971) – 351 pages, Newcombe/King/Smith/Goolagong on cover page
5. World of Tennis '73 (describing year 1972) – 352 pages, King/Nastase/Smith on cover page
6. World of Tennis '74 (describing year 1973) – 352 pages, Nastase/Court on cover page
7. World of Tennis '75 (describing year 1974) – 352 pages, Jimmy Connors on cover page
8. World of Tennis '76 (describing year 1975) – 352 pages, Arthur Ashe on cover page
9. World of Tennis 1977 (describing year 1976) – 384 pages, Björn Borg on cover page
10. World of Tennis 1978 (describing year 1977) – 416 pages, Virginia Wade on cover page
11. World of Tennis 1979 (describing year 1978) – 416 pages, Björn Borg on cover page
12. World of Tennis 1980 (describing year 1979) – 416 pages, Tracy Austin on cover page
13. World of Tennis 1981 (describing year 1980) – 416 pages, John McEnroe on cover page
14. World of Tennis 1982 (describing year 1981) – 416 pages, Chris Evert on cover page
15. World of Tennis 1983 (describing year 1982) – 416 pages, Jimmy Connors on cover page
16. World of Tennis 1984 (describing year 1983) – 416 pages, Martina Navratilova on cover page
17. World of Tennis 1985 (describing year 1984) – 480 pages, John McEnroe on cover page
18. World of Tennis 1986 (describing year 1985) – 480 pages, Boris Becker on cover page
19. World of Tennis 1987 (describing year 1986) – 480 pages, Ivan Lendl on cover page
20. World of Tennis 1988 (describing year 1987) – 512 pages, Steffi Graf on cover page
21. World of Tennis 1989 (describing year 1988) – 480 pages, Steffi Graf on cover page
22. World of Tennis 1990 (describing year 1989) – 480 pages, Boris Becker / Steffi Graf on cover page
23. World of Tennis 1991 (describing year 1990) – 448 pages, Stefan Edberg on cover page
24. World of Tennis 1992 (describing year 1991) – 448 pages, Guy Forget / Henri Leconte on cover page
25. World of Tennis 1993 (describing year 1992) – 464 pages, Jennifer Capriati on cover page
26. World of Tennis 1994 (describing year 1993) – 464 pages, Pete Sampras on cover page
27. World of Tennis 1995 (describing year 1994) – 474 pages, Arantxa Sánchez Vicario on cover page
28. World of Tennis 1996 (describing year 1995) – 512 pages, Andre Agassi on cover page
29. World of Tennis 1997 (describing year 1996) – 512 pages, Todd Woodbridge / Mark Woodforde on cover page
30. World of Tennis 1998 (describing year 1997) – 544 pages, Hingis/Rafter/Rosewall/Court on cover page
31. World of Tennis 1999 (describing year 1998) – 544 pages, Novotna/Hingis/Rafter on cover page
32. World of Tennis 2000 (describing year 1999) – 544 pages, Agassi/Sampras/Graf/Davenport on cover page
33. World of Tennis 2001 (describing year 2000) – 543 pages, Sampras/Kafelnikov/V.Williams/Hewitt on cover page
