= David Haggerty (tennis) =

American tennis administrator

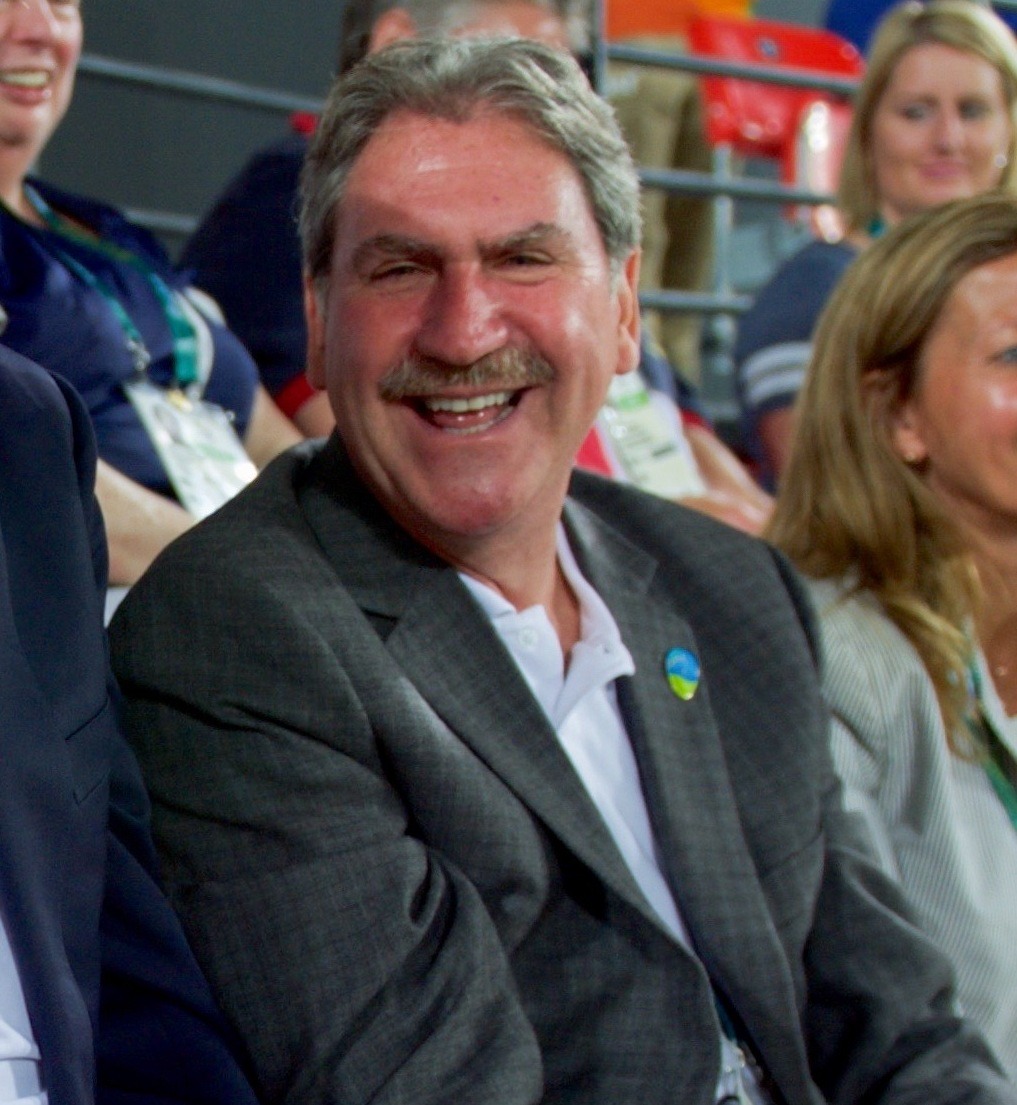
- Haggerty in 2016
- Country (sports): United States
- Born: July 10, 1957 (age 69)

David Haggerty (born July 10, 1957) is an American tennis administrator who was elected President of World Tennis (then known as the International Tennis Federation) in September 2015.

Haggerty was educated at the George Washington University School of Business on a tennis scholarship and graduated BBA. He worked as an executive at Prince Sports and Dunlop, then was chairman of Head U.S.A., part of the American-Austrian company which owns the American tennis racket brand Head. As of 2015, he was living in Pennington, New Jersey, but was planning to move to the United Kingdom, where the ITF is based.

Before being elected President of World Tennis, Haggerty was President of the United States Tennis Association. He narrowly beat the Indian candidate Anil Khanna by 200 votes to 192 and succeeded Francesco Ricci Bitti, an Italian who had served as World Tennis president for sixteen years. He became the only American to head an Olympic international federation, and in January 2020 was elected as a member of the International Olympic Committee.
