= List of national tennis associations =

This is a list of the national tennis associations in the world. There are six regional associations, 162 full members and 52 associate members without voting rights.

The six regional associations are:

- Asia: Asian Tennis Federation (ATF) with 44 members.
- Africa: Confederation of African Tennis (CAT) with 51 members.
- South America: Confederacion Sudamericana de Tenis (COSAT) with 10 members.
- Central America and the Caribbean: Confederation de Tenis de Centroamerica Caribe (COTECC) with 33 members.
- Oceania: Oceania Tennis Federation (OTF) with 20 members.
- Europe: Tennis Europe (TE) with 51 members.

== No regional affiliation ==
World Tennis Members (2):

- United States
- Canada

== Asian Tennis Federation (ATF) ==
Full Members (34):

- Bahrain
- Bangladesh
- Brunei
- China
- Chinese Taipei
- Hong Kong
- India
- Indonesia
- Iran
- Iraq
- Japan
- Jordan
- Kazakhstan
- South Korea
- Kuwait
- Kyrgyzstan
- Lebanon
- Malaysia
- Myanmar
- Oman
- Pakistan
- Philippines
- Qatar
- Saudi Arabia
- Singapore
- Sri Lanka
- Syria
- Tajikistan
- Thailand
- Turkmenistan
- United Arab Emirates
- Uzbekistan
- Vietnam
- Yemen

Associate Members (11):

- Afghanistan (suspended)
- Bhutan
- Cambodia
- North Korea (suspended)
- Laos
- Macau
- Maldives
- Mongolia
- Nepal
- Palestine
- Timor-Leste

== Confederation of African Tennis (CAT) ==
Full Members (29):

- Algeria
- Angola
- Benin
- Botswana
- Cameroon
- Congo
- Ivory Coast
- Djibouti
- Egypt
- Ethiopia
- Gabon
- Ghana
- Kenya
- Lesotho
- Libya
- Madagascar
- Mauritius
- Morocco
- Namibia
- Nigeria
- Rwanda
- Senegal
- South Africa
- Sudan
- Togo
- Tunisia
- Uganda
- Zambia
- Zimbabwe

Associate Members (22):

- Burkina Faso
- Burundi
- Cape Verde (suspended)
- Central African Republic
- Chad
- DR Congo
- Equatorial Guinea
- Eritrea
- Gambia
- Guinea-Bissau
- Guinea-Conakry
- Liberia
- Malawi
- Mali
- Mauritania
- Mozambique
- Niger
- Seychelles
- Sierra Leone
- Somalia
- Eswatini
- Tanzania

Non World Tennis-Members (2):

- Comoros
- São Tomé and Príncipe

== Confederacion Sudamericana de Tenis (COSAT) ==
Full Members (10):

- Argentina
- Bolivia
- Brazil
- Chile
- Colombia
- Ecuador
- Paraguay
- Peru
- Uruguay
- Venezuela

== COTECC (Central America and the Caribbean) ==
Full Members (18):

- Aruba
- Bahamas
- Barbados
- Bermuda
- Costa Rica
- Cuba
- Dominican Republic
- El Salvador
- Guatemala
- Haiti
- Honduras
- Jamaica
- Mexico
- Panama
- Puerto Rico
- Saint Lucia
- Trinidad and Tobago
- U.S. Virgin Islands

Associate Members (14):

- Antigua and Barbuda
- Bonaire
- Belize
- British Virgin Islands
- Cayman Islands
- Curaçao
- Dominica
- Grenada
- Guyana
- Nicaragua
- Saint Kitts and Nevis
- Saint Vincent and the Grenadines
- Suriname
- Turks and Caicos Islands

== Oceania Tennis Federation (OTF) ==
Full Members (2):

- Australia
- New Zealand

Associate Members (18):

- American Samoa
- Cook Islands
- Fiji
- French Polynesia
- Guam
- Kiribati
- Marshall Islands
- Federated States of Micronesia
- Nauru
- Norfolk Island
- Northern Mariana Islands
- Palau
- Papua New Guinea
- Samoa
- Solomon Islands
- Tonga
- Tuvalu
- Vanuatu

== Tennis Europe (TE) ==
Full Members (51):

- Albania
- Andorra
- Armenia
- Austria
- Azerbaijan
- Belarus (suspended)
- Belgium
- Bosnia and Herzegovina
- Bulgaria
- Croatia
- Cyprus
- Czech Republic
- Denmark
- Estonia
- Faroe Islands
- Finland
- France
- Georgia
- Germany
- Great Britain
- Greece
- Hungary
- Iceland
- Ireland
- Israel
- Italy
- Kosovo
- Latvia
- Liechtenstein
- Lithuania
- Luxembourg
- North Macedonia
- Malta
- Moldova
- Monaco
- Montenegro
- Netherlands
- Norway
- Poland
- Portugal
- Romania
- Russia (suspended)
- San Marino
- Serbia
- Slovakia
- Slovenia
- Spain
- Sweden
- Switzerland
- Turkey
- Ukraine

Non World Tennis-Member (1):

- Vatican City
