= Patrick Ogoegbunem Ukah =

Nigerian politician

Director-General of the Delta State Capital Territory Development Agency
- Incumbent
- Assumed office November 2023

Personal details
- Born: 10 April 1964 (age 62) jos, Plateau State, Nigeria
- Education: Obafemi Awolowo University
- Occupation: Sports Administrator; Entrepreneur; Politician

Patrick Ogoegbunem Ukah (born April 10, 1964) is a Nigerian politician, sports administrator, entrepreneur, and public servant. He has held positions in both the public and private sectors, contributing to sports administration, media, and governance.

== Early life and education ==
Ukah was born on April 10, 1964, in Jos, Plateau State, Nigeria, to Albert Kankenjimenjo Ukah and Veronica Ozoemezie Elueze. Raised in Okpanam, Delta State, he experienced a childhood marked by relocations.

He attended the University of Ife (now Obafemi Awolowo University), where he earned a diploma and a bachelor's degree in Health Education. He later obtained a Master of Business Administration (MBA) from the same institution.

Ukah has been married to Uche Perpetua Ukah for over 28 years, and they have three children.

== Career ==
Ukah began his career in sports and was a National Hockey Player before later serving as President of the Nigeria Hockey Federation. He has been involved in sports media as the Executive Producer of The Sports Market television program and Publisher of Sports Market International Magazine.

He served as Chairman of the Nigeria Olympic Marketing Committee, where he was involved in securing media rights for the 2012 Olympic Broadcast in Nigeria. As of recent years, his leadership extended into Golf, where he currently serves as Captain of the Ibori Golf and Country Club in Asaba, Delta State (2023–Present).

Ukah held various public service roles in Delta State. He served as commissioner for information (2012–2023), Commissioner for Basic and Secondary Education (2015–2023), and secretary to the state government (2021–2023).

In 2023, he was appointed director-general of the Delta State Capital Development Agency, where he has been involved in infrastructural development and policy implementation.

== Community engagement ==
During his tenure under Governor Ifeanyi Okowa's administration, various infrastructure projects were implemented in Okpanam. Ukah holds the chieftaincy title Akatakpo Enyi 1 of Okpanam Kingdom.
