= International Commission for the Wailing Wall =

Commission appointed by the British government

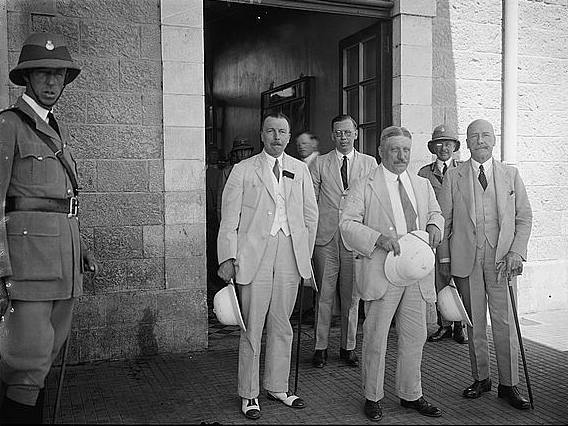
Western wall commission members 1930

The International Commission for the Wailing Wall (a.k.a. 1930 Western Wall Commission) was a commission appointed by the British government, under their responsibilities in the Mandate for Palestine, in response to the 1929 Palestine riots. The Commission appointed by the UK Government.

The commission was intended "to determine the rights and claims of Muslims and Jews in connection with the Western or Wailing Wall," and determine the causes of the violence and prevent it in the future.

== Background ==
The 1929 Palestine riots led both the Jewish and Arab communities in Mandatory Palestine to re-evaluate their security situation and according to Hillel Cohen of the Hebrew University of Jerusalem, led both communities to view Palestine as a "zero-sum game." Further, the dispute over religious rights at the Western Wall elevated the conflict between a united world Jewry and the Muslims of Palestine to a global level.

== Commission proceedings ==
The League of Nations approved the commission on condition that the members were not British. The commission comprised three jurists, one Swiss, one Swede, and one Dutch: Eliel Löfgren, Charles Barde and Carel Joseph van Kempen. Stig Sahlin was secretary to the commission. The commission followed conventional procedures of British courts, which provided each side to call and question witnesses.

The Muslim delegation was led by Awni Abd-al-Hadi and included Ahmad Zaki Pasha and Muahmmad Ali Pasha. Eleven lawyers from across the Arab world and India also attended for the Muslims. The Jewish side was represented by Elishea, David Yellin, and Rabbi Moshe Blau.

Over the course of the hearings, the Muslim side presented 26 documents and the Jewish side presented 35 documents. There were 23 commission sessions, during which 52 witnesses were heard: 21 from the Jewish side, 30 from the Muslim side, and one British official.

The Muslim delegation to the commission claimed that because of the Buraq, the Western Wall was holy to them and therefor had to remain in Muslim hands. In response, David Yellin questioned the notion by illustrating the disagreement between the exact site of the Buraq.

Rafael Meyuhas, the Sephardi beadle of the Western Wall, stressed the good relations between Jews and Muslims regarding the Western Wall. In his closing speech on behalf of the Jewish delegation, Yellin highlighted the centuries of peaceful coexistence and religious acceptance between Jews and Muslims and appealed to the Muslim "spirit of tolerance" juxtaposed against the Muslims "suddenly getting religion."

== Jewish requests to the commission ==
The Jews requested that the Commission take the following actions:

- To give recognition to the immemorial claim that the Wailing Wall is a Holy Place for the Jews, not only for the Jews in Palestine, but also for the Jews of the whole world.
- To decree that the Jews shall have the right of access to the Wall for devotion and for prayers in accordance with their ritual without interference or interruption.
- To decree that it shall be permissible to continue the Jewish services under the conditions of decency and decorum characteristic of a sacred custom that has been carried on for many centuries without infringement upon the religious rights of others.
- To decree that the drawing up of any regulations that may be necessary as to such devotions and prayers, shall be entrusted to the Rabbinate of Palestine, who shall thus re-assume full responsibility in that matter, in discharge of which responsibility they may consult the Rabbinate of the world.
- To suggest, if the Commissioners approve of the plan, to the Mandatory Power that it should make the necessary arrangements by which the properties now occupied by the Moghrabi Waqf might be vacated, the Waqf authorities accepting in lieu of them certain new buildings to be erected upon some eligible site in Jerusalem, so that the charitable purpose, for which this Waqf was given, may still be fulfilled.

David Yellin, Head of the Hebrew Teachers Seminary, member of the Ottoman parliament, and one of the first public figures to join the Zionist movement openly, testified before the commission. He stated:

"Being judged before you today stands a nation that has been deprived of everything that is dear and sacred to it from its emergence in its own land – the graves of its patriarchs, the graves of its great kings, the graves of its holy prophets and, above all, the site of its glorious Temple. Everything has been taken from it and of all the witnesses to its sanctity, only one vestige remains – one side of a tiny portion of a wall, which, on one side, borders the place of its former Temple. In front of this bare stone wall, that nation stands under the open sky, in the heat of summer and in the rains of winter, and pours out its heart to its God in heaven."

== Conclusions ==
The commission arrived at two primary conclusions:

A. To the Moslems belong the sole ownership of, and the sole proprietary right to, the Western Wall, seeing that it forms an integral part of the Haram-esh-Sherif area, which is a Waqf property.
B. The Jews shall have free access to the Western Wall for the purpose of devotions at all times subject to the explicit stipulations hereinafter to be mentioned.

The report then went on to stipulate in detail which actions of the Muslims and Jews should and should not be permitted.

The Commission noted that 'the Jews do not claim any proprietorship to the Wall or to the Pavement in front of it (concluding speech of Jewish Counsel, Minutes, page 908).'

The Commission concluded that the wall, and the adjacent pavement and Moroccan Quarter, were solely owned by the Muslim waqf. However, Jews had the right to "free access to the Western Wall for the purpose of devotions at all times", subject to some stipulations that limited which objects could be brought to the Wall and forbade the blowing of the shofar, which was made illegal. Muslims were forbidden to disrupt Jewish devotions by driving animals or other means.

The recommendations of the commission were brought into law by the Palestine (Western or Wailing Wall) Order in Council, 1931, which came into effect on June 8, 1931. Persons violating the law were liable to a fine of 50 pounds or imprisonment up to 6 months, or both.

== Subsequent events ==
During the 1930s, at the conclusion of Yom Kippur, young Jews persistently flouted the shofar ban each year and blew the shofar resulting in their arrest and prosecution.

They were usually fined or sentenced to imprisonment for three to six months.
