= Botswana Cycling Association =

National governing body of cycle racing in Botswana

- Sport: Cycling
- Abbreviation: BCA
- Founded: 1994
- Affiliation: UCI
- Regional affiliation: African Cycling Federation
- Headquarters: Gaborone
- Location: Affiliates Offices, Botswana National Stadium Gaborone
- President: Kagiso Morris Potongwane
- Secretary: Game Mompe

Official website
- www.botswananoc.org
- (Botswana)

Botswana Cycling Association or BCA is the national governing body of cycle racing in Botswana. Botswana Cycling Association is a member of the Confédération Africaine de Cyclisme and the Union Cycliste Internationale (UCI). It is affiliated to the Botswana National Olympic Committee (BNOC), as well as the Botswana National Sports Commission. Botswana Cycling Association regulates the five major disciplines within the sport, both amateur and professional, which include: road cycling, mountain biking, BMX biking, track cycling and para-cycling, currently the most active being road cycling & mountain biking.

== History ==
Botswana Cycling Association affiliated to Union Cycliste Internationale (UCI) in September 2013 after approval by General Assembly in Ponferrada, Spain. Botswana Cycling Association hosted the second African Youth Games which took place in Gaborone, from 22 to 31 May 2014 on the disciplines of road cycling & mountain biking as a fresh new member of the UCI.

Botswana Cycling Association participated for the first time in the 2015 Africa Continental Road Champs, held between 9 - 14 February in Wartburg, KwaZulu – Natal, South Africa where a record of 30 nations entered, it was by far the best attended Continental Championships in Africa.
