= Fédération Tunisienne de Tennis =

National tennis organization of Tunisia

Fédération Tunisienne de Tennis French: Fédération Tunisienne de Tennis Arabic: الجامعة التونسية لكرة المضرب
- Sport: Tennis; Beach tennis Wheelchair tennis
- Abbreviation: (FTT)
- Founded: 1920; 106 years ago
- Affiliation: International Tennis Federation (ITF)
- Regional affiliation: Confederation of African Tennis (CAT)
- Sub-regional affiliation: Arab Tennis Federation (ATF)
- Location: Tunis, Tunisia
- President: (Tunisia) Salma Mouelhi

Official website
- www.ftt.tn
- (Tunisia)

The Fédération Tunisienne de Tennis (French: Fédération Tunisienne de Tennis) (FTT) (Arabic: الجامعة التونسية لكرة المضرب), is the national Tennis association in Tunisia. FTT organizes team tennis within Tunisia and represents Tunisian tennis internationally. The federation is a member of the International Tennis Federation (ITF), Confederation of African Tennis (CAT) and the Arab Tennis Federation (ATF). The president of FTT is Salma Mouelhi.

In 2013 Tunisian tennis player Malek Jaziri was embroiled in a controversial political incident, when he withdrew from a tournament rather than play an Israeli player. In the October 2013 Tashkent Challenger, tournament in Tashkent, Uzbekistan, he was slated to play Israeli Amir Weintraub in the quarterfinals. But the Tunisian tennis federation ordered Jaziri by email to withdraw from the match, and he did so.

Weintraub said that Jaziri was "a good friend," and that "he really wanted to play." Israel Tennis Association CEO Shlomo Glickstein said: "It is sad to me that these kinds of things still happen. I feel bad for the athletes who find themselves embroiled in such situations, which end up hurting their careers.”

The International Tennis Federation (ITF) found that the Tunisian Tennis Federation breached the ITF constitution by ordering him not to compete. The organization barred Tunisia from competing in the 2014 Davis Cup. ITF president Francesco Ricci Bitti said: "There is no room for prejudice of any kind in sport or in society. The ITF Board decided to send a strong message to the Tunisian Tennis Federation that this kind of action will not be tolerated by any of our members."

== Board members ==
The new federal office of the FTT mandate 2016-2020 composed by:

Name	Position
(Tunisia) Salma Mouelhi	President
(Tunisia) Fakher Baraket	Member
(Tunisia) Houda Barouni	Member
(Tunisia) Abdelkarim Boughaba	Member
(Tunisia) Bassem Ben Hassen	Member
(Tunisia) Abdelaziz Boubaker	Member
(Tunisia) Amel Hachini	Member
(Tunisia) Sonia Dammak	Member
(Tunisia) Mondher Bouzgarrou	Member
(Tunisia) Walid Gritli	Member
(Tunisia) Seif Ismail	Member
(Tunisia) Ayoub Khedhir	Member

== See also ==
- Tunisia Davis Cup team
- Tunisia Fed Cup team
- Tunis Open
- Nana Trophy
