= Nigeria Rowing, Canoe and Sailing Federation =

Governing body for rowing, canoe and sailing in Nigeria

- Sport: Rowing, Canoeing and Sailing
- Jurisdiction: Nigeria
- Abbreviation: NRCSF
- Headquarters: National Stadium Complex, Surulere, Lagos, Nigeria
- President: Akin Ogunbiyi
- Secretary: Olubunmi Ola Oluode

Official website
- rowing.sitesng.com
- (Nigeria)

The Nigeria Rowing, Canoe and Sailing Federation (NRCSF) is the national governing body responsible for the development, promotion, and administration of rowing, canoeing, and sailing sports in Nigeria.

== History ==
The federation has overseen rowing, canoeing and sailing activities in Nigeria, including the development of training centres such as the canoe training facility at Jabi Lake, Abuja, aimed at improving performance and competitiveness of Nigerian athletes in these water sports.

== Governance ==
The federation is governed by an executive committee, which includes a president and secretary-general. In 2025, businessman and economist Dr Akin Ogunbiyi was elected president of the Nigeria Rowing, Canoe and Sailing Federation, succeeding Rear Admiral Festus Porbeni (Rtd).

== Activities ==
The NRCSF is responsible for organising national rowing, canoeing, and sailing competitions, training athletes and technical officials, and selecting Nigerian teams for international competitions. It also supports initiatives to increase participation and improve infrastructure for water sports across Nigeria. The federation has launched regional clubs to promote water sports development, including the IBOM Rowing, Canoeing and Sailing Club in Akwa Ibom State during the Niger Delta Sports Festival.

== International affiliation ==
The federation is recognized by the International Canoe Federation and is listed among the national federations entitled to participate in their events, including continental and global championships.

== Notable athletes ==
Several Nigerian athletes associated with the federation have competed internationally in canoe sprint and related disciplines, representing Nigeria at events such as the Youth Olympic Games. Ayomide Bello, for example, has achieved international competitive success in canoe sprint events under the federation's banner.

== See also ==
- Sport in Nigeria
- Nigerian Olympic Committee
