= Habu Gumel =

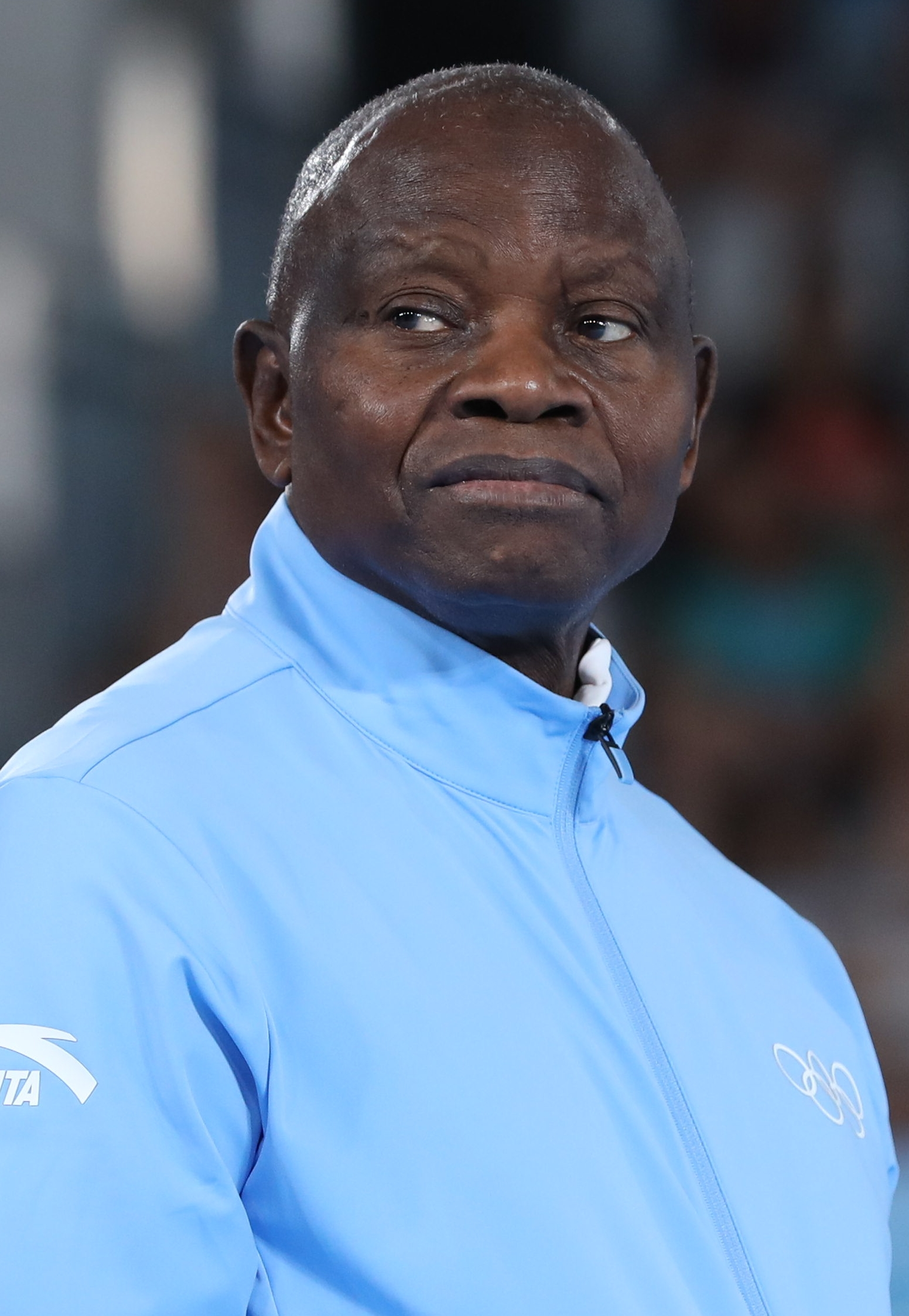
Habu Ahmed Gumel at the 2018 Summer Youth Olympics

Habu Gumel was born on 1 April 1949, in Gumel, Jigawa State, in Nigeria. He is currently the Nigeria Olympic Committee (NOC) President and an honorary member of the International Olympic Committee. Although the COVID-19 pandemic led to the delay of the Tokyo Games, Gumel stated that he believes that postponement will help the nation's athletes with their preparation.

== Education ==
Gumel attended the Technical College in Kano from 1961 and 1966, where he graduated with honours. He then went on to study at the Civil Engineering Institute in Kiev (former Soviet Union) from 1970 to 1976, where he received his Masters of Science in Civil and Structural Engineering.

== Career ==
Habu Gumel began his career in 1976–1977 at the National Youth Service Corps Scheme, for the Yankari Games Reserve in Nigeria. He then went on to be general manager at Bauchi State Cooperatives Building Association Limited from 1977 to 1983, where he became deputy chief of engineering from 1983 to 1984 and then later director of engineering from 1984 to 1985 of the Bauchi State Agricultural Development Program. He was deputy general manager of the Federal Housing Authority in Lagos, from 1985 to 1992, and then executive director of operations for the Federal Housing Authority in Abuja from 1993 to 1999.

He served as president of the Nigerian Society of Engineers (NSE) from 2000 to 2001, as well as president of the Council for the Regulation of Engineering in Nigeria (COREN) from 2004 to 2010. In 2009, he was executive secretary of the National Lottery Trust Fund, and in 2014 he was a fellow of the Nigerian Academy of Engineering.

== Sports career ==
In 1988, Gumel was a chairman and member of the Nigerian Volleyball Federation. In 1997, he was executive vice-president of the African Volleyball Confederation, where he was treasurer from 1997 to 2001 and then president from 2001 to 2010 then later in 2014. From 1997 to 2001, he was part of the Nigeria Olympic Committee. In 1998, Gumel was member and secretary of the Finance Commission of the International Volleyball Federation (FIVB), where in 2008 he was executive vice-president, and in 2009 he was the FIVB Technical Delegate for the London 2012 Olympic Games. In 2010, he was a member of the steering committee of the FIVB Development Fund. From 2000 to 2009, he was director of sports facilities for the National Sports Commission in Abuja. From 2002 to 2009 he was a Presidential ccommittee member of the All-African Games. 2005 to 2007, he was a member and chairman of the technical committee of the Abuja Bid Committee for the 2014 Commonwealth Games. He was president of Zone 3 for the Association of National Olympic Committees of Africa (ANOCA) from 2005 to 2009, were in 2005 he was an executive board member, and in 2009 he was treasurer general.

In the International Olympic Committee (IOC) he was a member of the Sports and Environment Committee from 2010 to 2015, the TV Rights and New Media Committee from 2014 to 2015. From 2015 to 2020, he was part of the Coordination for the Games of the XXXII Olympiad in Tokyo 2020. In 2016 and 2017, he was part of the Evaluation of the Games of the XXXIII Olympiad in 2024. In 2015, Gumel was a Delegate Member for Broadcast rights – Africa except MENA.

== Awards ==
In 2001, Gumel was awarded the National honour of the Officer of the Order of the Niger (OON).

In 2022, he was also conferred the award of the Order of the Rising Sun by the Japanese Government.
