= Nigeria Hockey Federation =

Governing body for hockey in Nigeria

- Sport: Field Hockey
- Jurisdiction: Nigeria
- Abbreviation: NHF
- Affiliation: FIH
- Regional affiliation: AfHF
- President: Engineer Obadiah Simon Nkom
- Secretary: Chimezie Asiegbu
- (Nigeria)

The Nigeria Hockey Federation (NHF) is the governing body of field hockey in Nigeria. It is affiliated to IHF International Hockey Federation and AfHF African Hockey Federation. The headquarter of NHF is in Abuja, Nigeria.

Engineer Obadiah Simon Nkom is the President of NHF and Chimezie Asiegbu is the Secretary General.

FIH is a governing body, which is responsible for certifying a Hockey Field/Ground. Currently there are no FIH Certified Fields in Nigeria.

The Nigeria Hockey men's national team made history in January at the 2022 Africa Cup of Nations in Ghana finishing third at the tournament after a 4-2 win against Kenya. It was their first ever podium finish at the Africa Cup of Nations.

== See also ==
- African Hockey Federation
- Nigeria Olympic Committee
