= Duane Williams =

American lawyer (1860–1912)

- Born: Charles Duane Williams; August 11, 1860; Radnor, Pennsylvania, United States
- Died: April 15, 1912 (aged 51); North Atlantic Ocean
- Occupation: lawyer
- Spouse: Lydia Biddle Williams-White

Charles Duane Williams (August 11, 1860 – April 15, 1912) was an American lawyer who was fundamental in founding the International Tennis Federation. He and his son were passengers aboard RMS Titanic when it sank; Williams died, while his son survived.

== Biography ==
Williams, originally from Radnor, Pennsylvania, spent most of his life in Geneva, Switzerland.

Williams is generally regarded the main driving force behind the foundation of the International Tennis Federation in 1913. There are two versions of what he actually did. According to one version, he addressed the president of the Swiss Lawn Tennis Federation, Charles Barde, whom he told of his idea to found an international umbrella association for tennis. Barde then told this to the president of the French tennis organization, Henry Wallet. According to another version, Williams wrote a letter to Wallet directly in October 1911, proposing to hold an international tennis tournament at Paris (the French Championships were only open to players from French clubs at that time). As the Wimbledon Championships were seen as the world championships on grass courts, he proposed to introduce a world championships on clay. Williams' letter led to the introduction of the World Hard Court Championships at Paris in 1912. The tournament's organizing committee consisting of delegates from several countries later evolved the International Lawn Tennis Federation, which was founded on March 1, 1913, at Paris.

In April 1912, Williams planned to return to the United States along with his son, R. Norris Williams ("Dick"), a famous tennis player, in order to visit his wife, Lydia Biddle Williams-White. Both men boarded the RMS Titanic at Cherbourg, as first class passengers. After the ship hit an iceberg and was sinking, Duane and Dick jumped into the water. While Dick was able to save himself, his father was killed by the first funnel falling from the ship.
