= World Tennis =

Governing body of international tennis

Coordinates: 51°27′32″N 0°15′19″W

- Formation: 1 March 1913; 113 years ago
- Founder: Duane Williams
- Founded at: Paris, France
- Type: Federation of national associations
- Headquarters: London, England
- Members: 214 national associations
- Official language: English
- President: David Haggerty
- Website: world.tennis
- Formerly called: International Tennis Federation (ITF)

World Tennis, known as the International Tennis Federation (ITF) until June 2026, is the governing body of world tennis, wheelchair tennis, and beach tennis. It was founded in 1913 as the "International Lawn Tennis Federation" by twelve national tennis associations. As of 2026, there are 214 national and six regional associations that make up the World Tennis membership.

World Tennis governance responsibilities include maintaining and enforcing the rules of tennis, regulating international team competitions, promoting the game, and preserving the sport's integrity via anti-doping and anti-corruption programs. World Tennis partners with the Association of Tennis Professionals (ATP) and the Women's Tennis Association (WTA) to govern professional tennis.

World Tennis organizes annual team competitions for men (Davis Cup), women (Billie Jean King Cup), and mixed teams (Hopman Cup), as well as tennis and wheelchair tennis events at the Summer Olympic and Paralympic Games on behalf of the International Olympic Committee and International Paralympic Committee. World Tennis sanctions circuits that span age ranges (junior, professional men and women, and non-professional players aged 30 and above) as well as disciplines (wheelchair tennis; beach tennis). In addition to these circuits, World Tennis also maintains rankings for juniors, non-professional adults (Masters tour), wheelchair and beach tennis.

== History ==
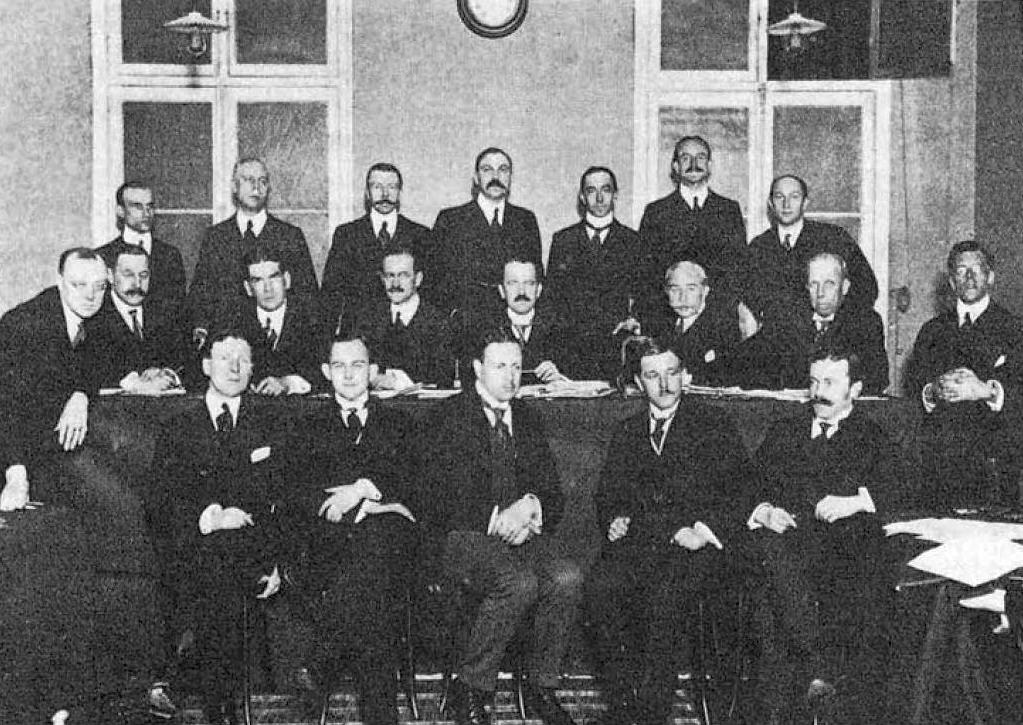
World Tennis founding members, 1913

Duane Williams, an American who lived in Switzerland, is generally recognized as the initiator and driving force behind the foundation of the International Tennis Federation. He died in the sinking of the RMS Titanic. Originally called the International Lawn Tennis Federation (ILTF) it held its inaugural conference at the headquarters of the Union des Sociétés Françaises de Sports Athlétiques (USFSA), in Paris, France on 1 March 1913 which was attended by 12 national associations. Three other countries could not attend but had requested to become a member. The 15 founding countries were: Australasia (Australia and New Zealand), Austria, Belgium, Denmark, France, Germany, Great Britain, Hungary, Italy, Netherlands, Russia, South Africa, Spain, Sweden, and Switzerland. Canada, Norway, and the United States were also invited but declined to join. Voting rights were divided based on the perceived importance of the individual countries, with Great Britain's Lawn Tennis Association (LTA) receiving the maximum six votes.

The LTA was given the perpetual right to organize the World Grass Championships, which led to a refusal by the United States Lawn Tennis Association (USLTA) to join the ILTF as they were of the opinion that this title should be given to the Davis Cup. France received permission to stage the World Hard Court Championships until 1916 and additionally a World Covered Court Championships was founded. The USLTA joined in 1923 on the basis of two compromises: the title 'World Championships' would be abolished, and wording would be 'for ever in the English language'. The World Championships were replaced by a new category of Official Championships for the main tournaments in Australia, France, England, and the United States; now known as the four Majors or Grand Slam events. In 1924, the ILTF became the officially recognised organisation with authority to control lawn tennis throughout the world, with official ILTF Rules of Tennis.

In 1939 the ILTF had 59 member nations. Its funds were moved to London, England during World War II and from that time onward World Tennis has been run from there. It was based at Wimbledon until 1987, when it moved to Barons Court, next door to Queen's Club. It then moved again in 1998 to the Bank of England Sports Ground, Roehampton, its current base of operations. In 1977 the word 'Lawn' was dropped from the name of the organization, in recognition of the fact that most tennis events were no longer played on grass.

In reaction to the 2022 Russian invasion of Ukraine, World Tennis cancelled all events in Russia and Belarus. World Tennis also excluded Russia from international team events, which include the Davis Cup, the Billie Jean King Cup, and the ATP Cup, and suspended the Russian Tennis Federation. However, the ATP and the WTA refused to yield to international pressure to ban individual players from competition. Russian players will carry on, but not play under the Russian national flag.

== Publications ==
Its official annual is The ITF Year, describing the activities of World Tennis over the last 12 months. This replaced World of Tennis, which was the ITF official annual from 1981 through 2001. In addition, it publishes an official magazine three times a year.

== Structure ==
=== National and regional associations ===
Map of the world showing countries whose national tennis associations are World Tennis members. Colors indicate the six regional associations. Russia and Belarus have been suspended since the 2022 Invasion of Ukraine.

As of 2017, there are 211 national associations affiliated with World Tennis, of which 148 are voting members and 63 are associate members. The criteria for allocating votes (1, 3, 5, 7, 9, or 12) to each voting member are: performance in World Tennis team competitions; professional (ATP/WTA), junior, and wheelchair rankings of individuals; track record in organizing international tournaments; and contribution to World Tennis infrastructure. For example, France garners 12 votes, Canada has 9, Egypt has 5, Pakistan has 3, and Botswana has 1 vote.

Regional associations were created in July 1975 as six "supra-national associations" (Europe, Asia, Africa, North America, South America, and Australia) with the aim to decrease the gap between the ILTF and the national associations. These evolved into the current regional associations:

Asian Tennis Federation (ATF) – 44 members
Central American & Caribbean Tennis Confederation (COTECC) – 33 members
Confederation of African Tennis (CAT) – 52 members
Oceania Tennis Federation (OTF) – 20 members
South America Tennis Confederation (COSAT) – 10 members
Tennis Europe (TE) – 50 members (Due to the Russian invasion of Ukraine in 2022, Tennis Europe suspended from membership both the Russian Tennis Federation and the Belarus Tennis Federation.)
World Tennis members with no regional affiliation (Canada and the United States)

=== Board of directors ===
The World Tennis President and Board of Directors are elected every four years by the national associations. Candidates are nominated by the national associations, and may serve up to twelve years.

Board of Directors (2019–2023)
Role	Board Member	National Association
President	David Haggerty	United States
Vice President & Treasurer	Rene Stammbach	Switzerland
Vice President	Katrina Adams	United States
Vice President	Bernard Giudicelli	France
Vice President	Bulat Utemuratov	Kazakhstan
Board Members	Carlos Bravo	Costa Rica
Board Members	Martin Corrie	(United Kingdom) Great Britain
Board Members	Jack Graham	Canada
Board Members	Nao Kawatei	Japan
Board Members	Anil Khanna	India
Board Members	Ulrich Klaus	Germany
Board Members	Salma Mouelhi Guizani	Tunisia
Board Members	Camilo Pérez López Moreira	Paraguay
Board Members	Aleksey Selivanenko	Russia
Board Members	Stefan Tzvetkov	Bulgaria
Athlete Board Members	Mary Pierce	France
Athlete Board Members	Mark Woodforde	Australia

=== List of presidents ===
The following people have served as president of World Tennis:

#	President	Start	End	Country
1	Pierre Gillou	1938	1939	France
2	Charles Barde	1939	1946	Switzerland
3	Paul de Borman	1946	1947	Belgium
4	Pierre Gillou (2)	1947	1948	France
5	James Eaton Griffith	1948	1949	United Kingdom
6	Barclay Kingman	1949	1950	United States
7	Roy Youdale	1950	1951	Australia
8	David Croll	1951	1952	Netherlands
9	Charles Barde (2)	1952	1953	Switzerland
10	James Eaton Griffith (2)	1953	1954	United Kingdom
11	Barclay Kingman (2)	1954	1955	United States
12	Giorgio de Stefani	1955	1956	Italy
13	Roy Youdale (2)	1956	1957	Australia
14	Robert N. Watt	1957	1958	Canada
15	Charles Barde (3)	1958	1959	Switzerland
16	James Eaton Griffith (3)	1959	1960	United Kingdom
17	Jean Borotra	1960	1961	France
18	Roy Youdale (3)	1961	1962	Australia
19	Giorgio de Stefani (2)	1962	1963	Italy
20	James Eaton Griffith (4)	1963	1965	United Kingdom
21	Paulo da Silva Costa	1965	1967	Brazil
22	Giorgio de Stefani (3)	1967	1969	Italy
23	Ben Barnett	1969	1971	Australia
24	Allan Heyman	1971	1974	Denmark
25	Walter Elcock	1974	1975	United States
26	Derek Hardwick	1975	1977	United Kingdom
27	Philippe Chatrier	1977	1991	France
28	Brian Tobin	1991	1999	Australia
29	Francesco Ricci Bitti	1999	2015	Italy
30	David Haggerty	2015	current	United States

== Governance ==
World Tennis is the world governing body for the sport of tennis. Its governance includes the following responsibilities: make, amend, and enforce the Rules of Tennis; regulate international team competitions; promote the game of tennis; and preserve the integrity of tennis.

By its own constitution, World Tennis guarantees that the official Rules of Tennis "shall be for ever in the English language". A committee within World Tennis periodically makes rule amendment recommendations to the board of directors. The Rules of Tennis encompass the manner of play and scoring, in-game coaching, and the technical specifications of equipment (e.g. ball, racket, net, court) and other technology (e.g. player analysis technology). The Rules cover tennis, wheelchair tennis, and beach tennis.

Through the Tennis Anti-Doping Program, World Tennis implements the World Anti-Doping Code (from the World Anti-Doping Agency, or WADA) for tennis. National associations must implement the code within its national jurisdiction, report violations up to World Tennis and WADA, and report annually about all testing conducted. The Tennis Anti-Doping Program began in 1993, and applies to all players who play in World Tennis-sanctioned competitions, as well as tournaments on the ATP Tour and WTA Tour. In 2015, 2514 samples were collected from men and 1919 samples were collected from women; 2256 samples were collected during tennis tournaments ("in-competition") and 2177 were collected at other times ("out-of-competition").

The Tennis Integrity Unit (TIU) is a joint initiative of the primary governing bodies in tennis: World Tennis, the Association of Tennis Professionals (ATP), the Women's Tennis Association (WTA), and the Grand Slam Board. Formed in 2008 in response to betting-related corruption challenges, the TIU's mandate is to protect tennis from "all forms of betting-related corrupt practices". As with the anti-doping efforts, national associations are charged with the responsibility of enforcing a code of conduct and reporting any violations.

== Competitions ==
=== Team competitions ===
World Tennis operates the two major annual international team competitions in the sport, the Davis Cup for men and the Billie Jean King Cup for women. It also sanctions the Hopman Cup, an annual mixed-gender team tournament. World Tennis also organizes tennis and wheelchair tennis events every four years at the Summer Olympic and Paralympic Games on behalf of the International Olympic Committee.

==== Davis Cup ====
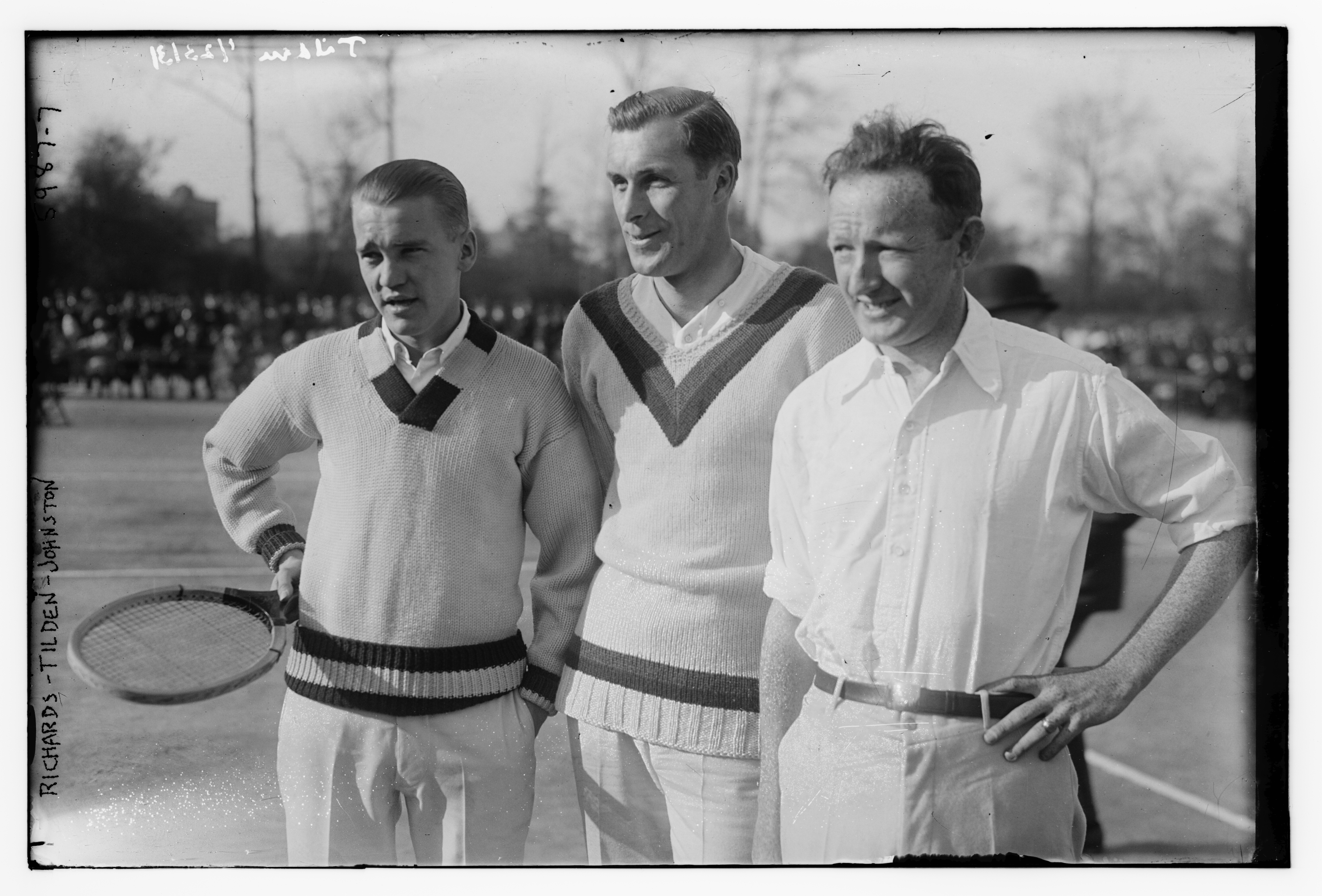
Vincent Richards, Bill Tilden and Bill Johnston at the 1922 Davis Cup

The Davis Cup, named after its founder Dwight F. Davis, is an annual team event organized by World Tennis (since 1979 when it replaced the Committee of Davis Cup Nations as event organiser) in men's tennis contested between teams from competing countries in a knock-out format. The first Davis Cup took place in 1900, prior to the formation of World Tennis. Since 2019, the tournament has ended with the Davis Cup Finals, an 18-team event (being reduced to 16 effective in 2022) held at a single site in which teams are divided into groups for round-robin pool play. Eight teams advance to the quarterfinals, with all subsequent ties held in a standard knockout format. From 1981 to 2018, the tournament was divided into a 16-nation World Group, and zone groups (Americas; Europe/Africa; and Asia/Oceania) which compete in three or four tiers. Starting in 2019, the Davis Cup introduced a new format for its top level. The World Group was expanded to two levels, World Group I and World Group II, each consisting of 24 teams (reducing to 16 from 2022), with lower levels remaining intact. Each year, successful teams are may be promoted up one level, while unsuccessful teams are relegated down one level. Davis Cup rounds are contested four times per year, scheduled to minimize disruption with the ATP Tour to encourage participation. In each round, a combination of singles and doubles matches are contested to determine the winners. In 2020, 142 nations participated, making it the largest annual international team competition in sport.

==== Billie Jean King Cup ====
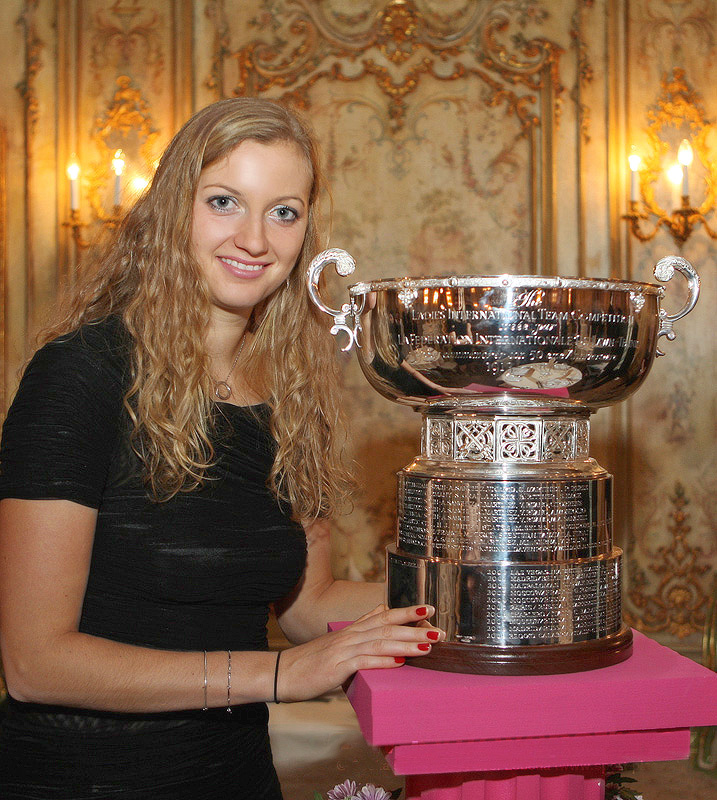
Petra Kvitová, a member of the winning Czech Republic Fed Cup Team in 2011

The Billie Jean King Cup is an annual team event organized by World Tennis in women's tennis, similar in format to the Davis Cup. It was launched in 1963 as the Federation Cup to celebrate the 50th anniversary of World Tennis, renamed the Fed Cup in 1995, and renamed again to honor tennis great Billie Jean King in 2020. The current format, adopted in 2020, is similar to that now used for the Davis Cup, with nations being divided into zone groups (Americas; Europe/Africa; and Asia/Oceania) which compete in two or three tiers, with the top tier being the 12-team Billie Jean King Cup Finals. The Finals are conducted in a similar manner as those of the Davis Cup, with pool play followed by knockout semifinals and finals. The winner and runner-up of the Finals automatically qualify for the next season's Finals. Teams ranked 3–10 advance to the next season's Billie Jean King Cup Qualifiers, where they play against the winners of the previous season's Billie Jean King Cup Play-offs. The play-offs in turn involve the losing teams from the Qualifiers and winning teams from the top-level zone groups. Like the Davis Cup, the rules of promotion and relegation are almost the same each year. Billie Jean King Cup rounds are contested three times per year, scheduled to minimize disruption with the WTA Tour to encourage participation. In each round, a combination of singles and doubles matches are contested to determine the winners. In 2020, 116 nations participated, making it the largest annual international team competition in women's sport.

==== U14 World Cup (Men / Women) ====
World Junior Tennis Competition - es:Copa Mundial de Tenis Juvenil (U14) Since 1991.

==== U12 Intercontinental Team Competition ====
U12 Intercontinental Team Competition

==== Hopman Cup ====
The Hopman Cup is an annual team event which is contested by mixed-gender national teams. The first tournament was held in 1989, and the event has been sanctioned by World Tennis since 1997. The tournament is held over one week at the start of the tennis season (late December or early January) in Australia. Each year, eight nations are selected to compete, with one female and one male invited to attend. Two pools of four teams each play matches in a round-robin format, with the top team from each pool qualifying for the final.

==== Olympics and Paralympics ====
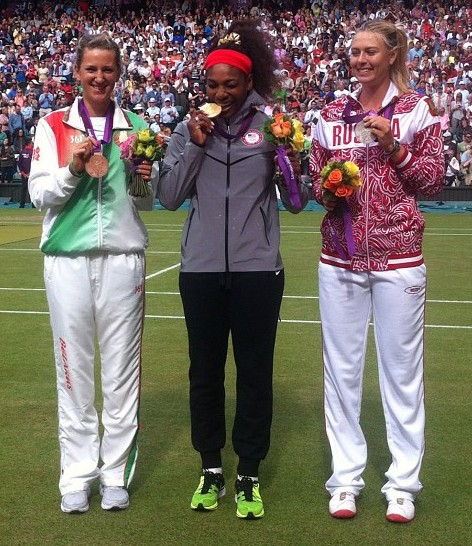
Victoria Azarenka, Serena Williams, and Maria Sharapova at the 2012 Summer Olympics

Tennis (lawn tennis) was part of the Summer Olympic Games program from the inaugural 1896 Summer Olympics, but was dropped after the 1924 Summer Olympics due to disputes between World Tennis and the International Olympic Committee over allowing amateur players to compete. After two appearances as a demonstration sport in 1968 and 1984, it returned as a full medal sport at the 1988 Summer Olympics and has been played at every edition of the Games since then.

Wheelchair tennis was first contested at the Summer Paralympic Games as a demonstration sport in 1988, with two events being held (Men's and Women's Singles). It became an official medal-awarding sport in 1992 and has been competed at every Summer Paralympics since then. Four events were held from 1992 to 2000, with quad events (mixed gender) in both singles and doubles added in 2004.

=== Individual competitions ===
World Tennis sanctions the Grand Slam tennis tournaments as well as circuits which span age ranges (junior, professional, and seniors) as well as disciplines (wheelchair tennis; beach tennis). In addition to these circuits, World Tennis also maintains rankings for juniors, seniors, wheelchair, and beach tennis.

==== World Veteran Championship ====
Team & Individual (30-35-40-45-50-55-60-65-70-75-80-85-90)

World Tennis Masters Tour and championship was started in 1973/1981. World championships began in 1981. In 1993, the world championships were divided into two age ranges, and in 2015 it was further divided into three age ranges. As of 2015, the ranges are Young Seniors (35 to 49); Seniors (50 to 64); and Super-Seniors (65 to 85).

World Individual Championships (65, 70, 75, 80, 85, 90) Since 2015 in Men, Women and Mixed in S / D and Team.

World Tennis Masters Tour World Championships 30-90+ Age Categories

30–55 years Since 2001.

==== Grand Slam tournaments ====
World Tennis organizes and sanctions the 'Official Tennis Championships of the International Tennis Federation', commonly known as the Grand Slam events: the Australian Open, the French Open, Wimbledon, and the US Open. It is a member of the Grand Slam Committee.

==== Professional circuit ====
World Tennis organizes introductory ("apprentice" level) professional circuits for both men and women as a bridge between junior tournaments and playing on the higher-profile tours organized by the ATP and WTA, respectively. Professional circuit tournaments are open to all tennis players aged 14 and over based on merit, and offer both prize money and world ranking points for main draw match victories. The tournaments are owned or sanctioned by the national associations and approved by World Tennis.

Although circuits were introduced to men's tennis in 1976, World Tennis assumed responsibility for developing them in 1990. From then until 2006, four-week satellite tournaments were run, where participants were required to compete in the entire series. In 1998, single-week World Tennis Futures tournaments were introduced, although they are scheduled in two or three-week geographic clusters. As of 2016, over 600 World Tennis Futures tournaments in 77 countries were held, with prize funds ranging from US$10,000 to US$25,000. World Tennis Futures tournaments represent the third tier of men's tournaments, below the mid-level ATP Challenger Tour and the top-level ATP World Tour.

World Tennis assumed responsibility for an apprentice-level women's circuit in 1984. As of 2016, the ITF Women's Circuit includes over 500 tournaments in 65 countries, with prize funds ranging from US$10,000 to US$100,000. The World Tennis Tour is the third tier in women's tennis, below the mid-level WTA 125 tournaments and the top-level WTA Tour.

==== Junior circuit ====
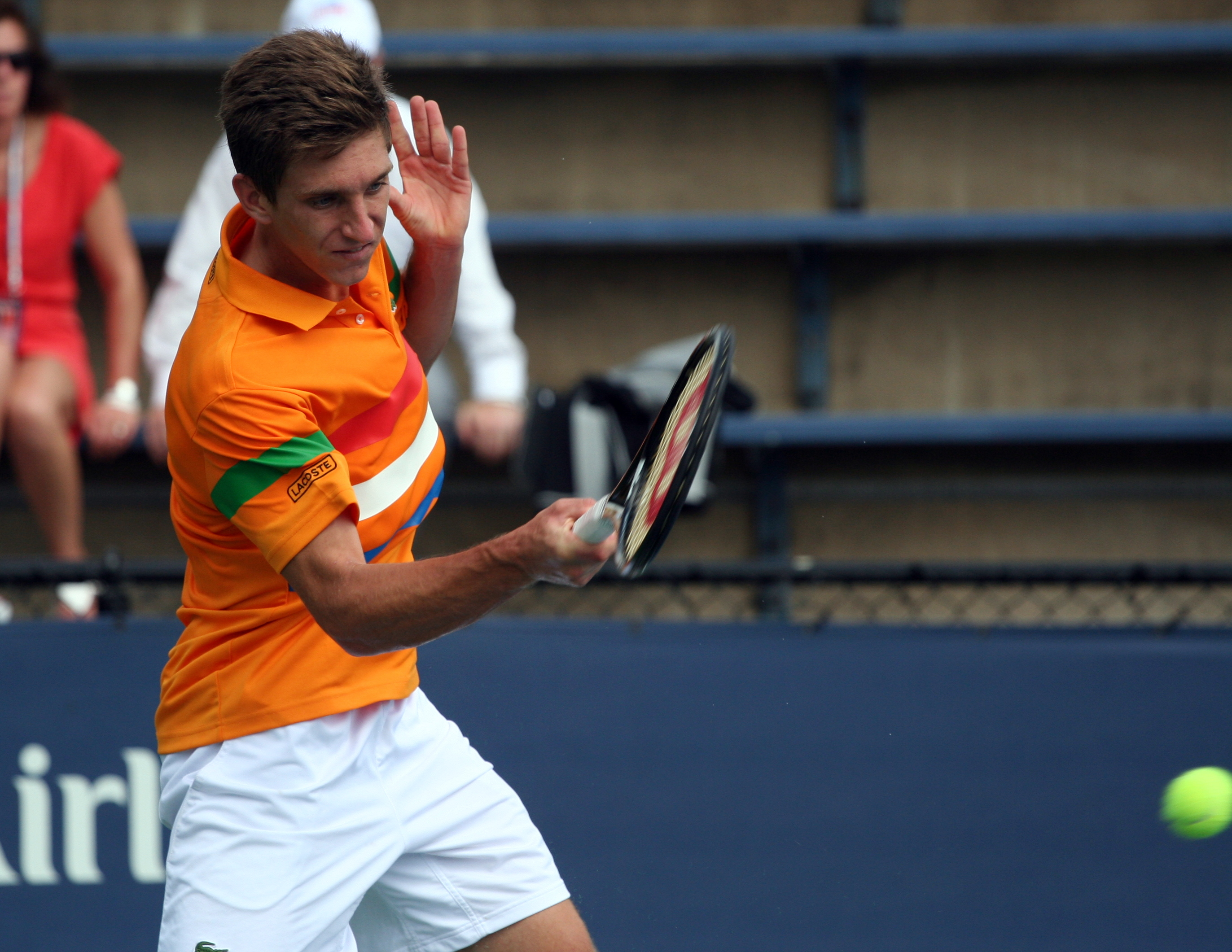
Filip Peliwo, World Tennis Junior World Champion 2012, during the 2012 Junior US Open

Starting in 1977, World Tennis has organized a series of international tennis tournaments for junior players. Tournaments have various grades: Grade A (the highest; junior Grand Slams and some others), Grade 1, Grade 2, Grade 3, Grade 4, and Grade 5 (the lowest). Depending on the grade of tournament, players earn points toward World Tennis Junior World Rankings. In 2004, World Tennis introduced combined junior rankings rather than maintaining separate singles and doubles rankings for juniors in an effort to encourage doubles play. As of 2015, the junior circuit includes 400 tournaments in 121 countries, open to players who are between their 13th and 19th birthdays.

In order to help high-ranking junior girls transition from the junior circuit to the professional circuit, World Tennis began the Girls Junior Exempt Project in 1997. Under this program, girls ranked in the top 10 at the end of the year are given direct entry into the main draw of three events on the World Tennis professional circuit the following year. In 2006, this project was extended for boys under similar rules.

==== Seniors circuit ====
The ITF World Tennis Masters Tour was renamed in August 2022 (previously ITF Seniors Tour). The World Tennis Masters Tour provides a range of team and individual singles, doubles and mixed doubles events for each five-year age increment from 30+ to 90+. The World Tennis Masters Tour Circuit has over 380 tournaments in more than 72 countries. There are six tournament grades. The entry level tournament grade is MT100, followed by MT200, MT400, MT700, MT1000 and World Championships. MT700, MT1000 and World Championships are amongst the elite tournaments on the World Tour attracting some of the very best tennis players globally including but not limited to former ATP players.

Previously, tournaments were classified into various grades, with Grade A being the highest and Grade 5 being the lowest. Rankings were maintained in a series of age groups where the starting ages advance five years at a time (e.g. 35 years and older; 40 years and older) up to the 85 years and older group. World championships began in 1981. In 1993, the world championships were divided into two age ranges, and in 2015 it was further divided into three age ranges. As of 2015, the ranges are Young Seniors (35 to 49); Seniors (50 to 64); and Super-Seniors (65 to 85).

==== Wheelchair circuit ====
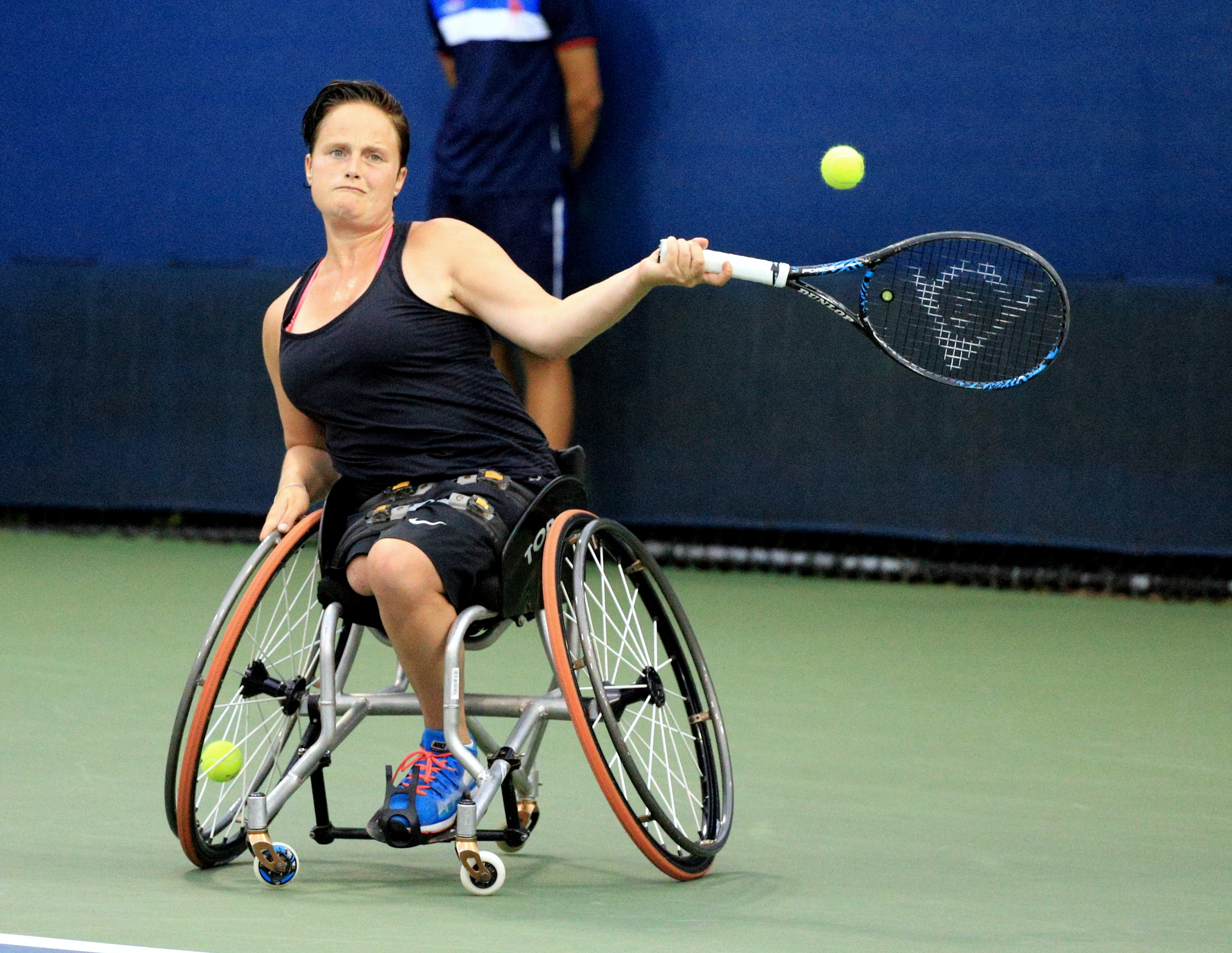
Aniek van Koot at the 2015 US Open

The first circuit for wheelchair tennis, formed in 1980 by the National Foundation of Wheelchair Tennis, had ten tournaments. Beginning in 1992, the Wheelchair Tennis Tour began with eleven events, organized by the International Wheelchair Tennis Federation (IWTF) which merged with World Tennis six years later. As of 2016, the wheelchair tennis circuit includes over 160 events in over 40 countries. This includes tournaments ranging from Futures (the lowest level) up to the Grand Slams.

==== Beach tennis circuit ====
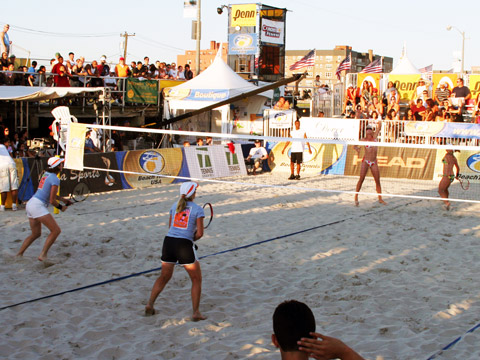
Beach tennis match

In 2008, World Tennis assumed responsibility for the development of beach tennis and launched the Beach Tennis Tour (BTT). This tour started with 14 tournaments, but has grown to nearly 300 tournaments by 2015. The most prestigious of these are the World Tennis Beach Tennis World Team Championship, World Tennis Beach Tennis World Championships, European Beach Tennis Championships, and the World Tennis Pan American Championships. Like the other World Tennis circuits, tournaments are sanctioned by World Tennis and primarily organized by national associations. World Tennis also maintains a system of rankings for beach tennis players.

== Awards and rankings ==
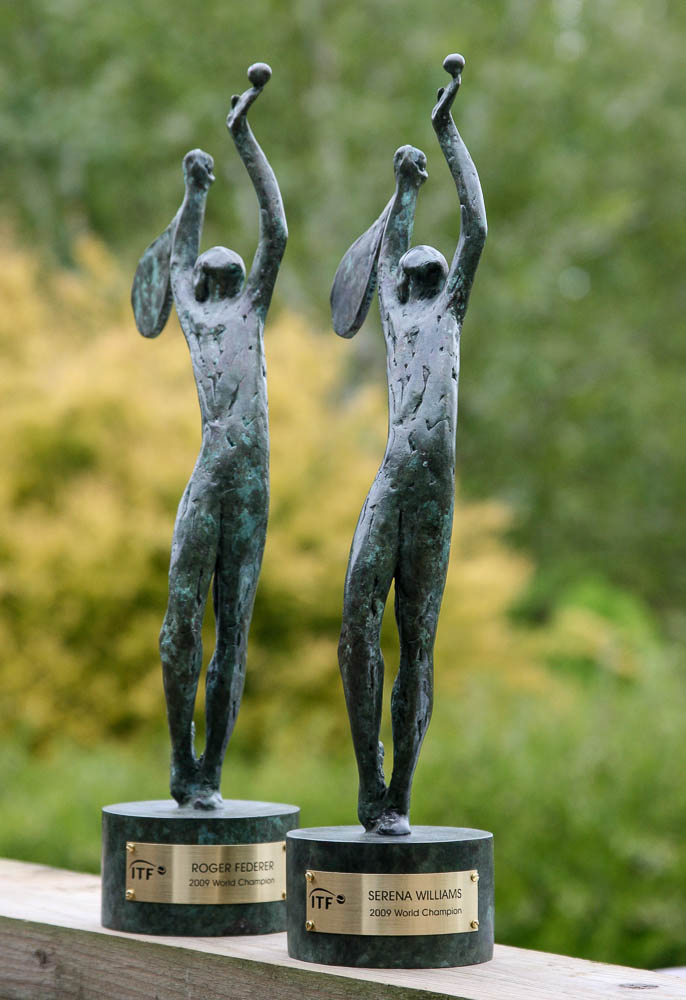
2009 ITF World Champion trophies awarded to Roger Federer and Serena Williams

=== World champions ===
World Tennis designates a World Champion in several disciplines each year based on performances throughout the year, emphasizing the Grand Slam tournaments, and also considering team events such as the Davis Cup and Fed Cup. Singles champions were first named in 1978. In later years, World Champion awards were added for doubles, juniors (using a combined singles and doubles ranking), and wheelchair players.

Although the selection of World Champions generally agree with the year-end ATP and WTA rankings, this is not always the case. For example, Jennifer Capriati was designated as the World Champion in 2001, after winning the Australian Open and French Open and finishing the year ranked number two. Lindsay Davenport, on the other hand, finished the year ranked number one, but her best performances at majors were two semifinal appearances.

=== Philippe Chatrier Award ===
The Philippe Chatrier Award is an annual World Tennis award to recognise individuals or organisations who have made outstanding contributions to tennis globally, both on and off the court. The award, introduced in 1996, is considered to be World Tennis's highest accolade and is named after the former French tennis player Philippe Chatrier, who was President of the governing body between 1977 and 1991.

=== National rankings ===
World Tennis maintains rankings of nations in both women's and men's tennis based solely on recent performances in the Billie Jean King Cup and Davis Cup, respectively. These rankings are used to seed teams at the start of each year in their respective groups.

The women's and men's rankings are calculated using a similar method. In both cases, a nation's points are a weighted sum of points earned over the past four years. Points are earned by victorious nations depending on the group (e.g. World Group versus Zonal Groups), the round (e.g. final versus first round), and the ranking of the opponent being played. For the men's ranking only, additional bonus points are awarded for winning on an opponent's home ground. Points earned in the last 12 months are weighted at 100%, but points earned two years (75%), three years (50%), and four years (25%) ago are weighted less.

== Player rating and registration ==
=== ITN ===
The International Tennis Number (ITN) is an international tennis rating system that gives tennis players a number that represents their general level of play. Players are rated from ITN 1 (ATP or WTA standard or equivalent) to 10 (starter players).

Conversion charts have been developed linking the ITN to other existing rating systems in World Tennis tennis nations and in time it is hoped that every tennis player worldwide will have a rating.

Below ITN 10 there are 3 further categories linked to the slower balls:

- 10.1 for players using green balls on the full-size court
- 10.2 for players using orange balls on the 18-metre court
- 10.3 for players using red balls on the 11-metre court

Once players can ‘serve, rally and score’ they should have a rating to help them find players of a similar level to play with.

=== IPIN ===
In late 2004 World Tennis initiated a new IPIN (International Player Identification Number) programme that requires all players who play in World Tennis Pro Circuit tournaments to register online. The use of IPIN has since been extended to include the World Tennis Junior, Seniors, and Wheelchair Circuits. A player's IPIN, which is 3 letters followed by 7 numbers, is assigned upon registration and will not change during the course of his or her career. Once registered, players can use the IPIN website to enter and withdraw from World Tennis tournaments, access tournament information and updates, and see details relating to any code of conduct offenses. Annual IPIN registration fees vary depending on the ITF circuit chosen by the player.

== Integrity ==
World Tennis administers the Tennis Anti-Doping Programme (TADP) on behalf of the sport and as a WADA signatory. It also administered the Tennis Anti-Corruption Program (TACP) until 2020 via its operationally independent integrity division called the Tennis Integrity Unit (TIU). In 2021, the TIU was transferred out of World Tennis into the new International Tennis Integrity Agency (ITIA) following a comprehensive review of corruption in the sport. From 2022, it is intended that the TADP will also be transferred over to the ITIA.

== Fine of the Tunisian Tennis Federation ==
Tunisian player Malek Jaziri and Israeli player Amir Weintraub were scheduled to play each other at the 2013 Tashkent Challenger in October 2013, however Jaziri withdrew from the competition. According to Jaziri's brother, Jaziri had been ordered to withdraw from the competition.

The Association of Tennis Professionals investigated and found that Jaziri had done nothing wrong and that the Tunisian Tennis Federation's interference with the game had constituted a breach of World Tennis Constitution. Consequently, Tunisia was suspended from the 2014 Davis Cup competition. World Tennis president Francesco Ricci Bitti said, "There is no room for prejudice of any kind in sport or in society. The ITF Board decided to send a strong message to the Tunisian Tennis Federation that this kind of action will not be tolerated."

== Fine of the Israel Tennis Association ==
A Davis Cup game between the Israeli national tennis team and the Belgian national tennis team was scheduled in Antwerp for 14 September 2013. Because the match was scheduled for Yom Kippur, the Israeli team requested to postpone the match by one day. The Belgian national tennis team declined to postpone the game.

The International Tennis Federation intervened and postponed the match by one day. It also fined the Israel Tennis Association more than $13,000 for the inconvenience of rescheduling.

== See also ==
- List of international sport federations
- Association of Tennis Professionals
- Women's Tennis Association
- History of tennis
- Grand Prix tennis circuit
- Tennis Integrity Unit
- International Tennis Integrity Agency
- Wightman Cup
- ITF Wheelchair Tennis Tour
- World Tennis Championship
