= Cycling Federation of Nigeria =

Governing body for Cycling in Nigeria

- Sport: Cycle racing/Track Championships
- Abbreviation: CFN
- Founded: 1972
- Affiliation: UCI
- Regional affiliation: African Cycling Federation
- Headquarters: Abuja, Nigeria
- Location: The Velodrome Complex, National Stadium
- President: Giandomenico Massari

Official website
- cfn.ng
- (Nigeria)

The Cycling Federation of Nigeria or CFN was established in 1972 as the national governing body of cycle racing in Nigeria. It is a member of the International Cycling Union and African Cycling Federation.

Cycling Federation of Nigeria is the body empowered by the Federal Government of Nigeria to govern and promote Cycling sport in Nigeria. Cycling as an organized sporting activity started back in Nigeria since 1972 and has grown over the years to a popular promotional and award-winning sport. Meanwhile, all the Cycling Associations in Nigeria are affiliated to the Cycling Federation of Nigeria.

Cycling is one of the oldest sporting events in Nigeria. Before then, the sport was for leisure, recreation and to keep fit (physical fitness). The national governing body was made up of members nominated and approved from parts of the regions. Cycling is one of the most expensive sports due to cost of equipment and parts which are imported from developed and industrialized countries like Europe, America and Asia. The cost effect, make it difficult for many people or clubs to be involved or procure the special bicycle and outfits.

In the early 70s, the governing body of the sport was known as Nigeria Amateur Cycling Association. This body over ruled and regulated other bodies formed in then four regions in Nigeria namely: Northern, Western, Mid Western and Eastern regions. It was introduced into the country as far back as the early days of colonialism. The ownership and use of bicycle by some privileged African then was indeed a mark of arrival. It was prestigious to own a bicycle in those days.

The first coaching course took place in Kaduna at the Northern part of Nigeria. The second was at Ibadan, and then the third was at the University of Ife, from 19 August to September, 1976. Cycling competition was first organized in Nigeria on 18 – 24 November 1973.

The first Cycling Club in Nigeria known as “ Armstong Cycling Club” was formed in Lagos in 1956 with Pa Sobayo as the founder and first Chairman. Other prominent members of the club then were Rev. Father Slattery, Chief Kunle Oyero and Prince T. O. Alade. A reliable source has it that the first President of Nigeria Hon. Nnamdi Azikwe was the patron of the Club. In 1962, a group of enthusiastic young men, like J. J Umoh, S. S Bassey, O. O Adeke and U. U Samuel joined the club as cyclists.

The first known modern cycling race in Nigeria was organized by “Raleigh” and it was held in Lagos in 1962. The race was won by of the pioneer cyclist J. J Umoh, information has it that the race was a distance of 20 miles.

After the creation of States from the then four regions, each State formed their Cycling Associations known as State Amateur Cycling Association. This body became the governing board to oversee the development of cycling. The state associations are overruled by the Nigeria Amateur cycling Association, which became known as Cycling Federation of Nigeria today.

Nigeria Cycling participated for the first time in the African Continental Championship that was held in Sharm-El-Sheik in Egypt in 2013 and won a Silver medal in the Elite Women Team Time Trial.
