= Confederation of African Tennis =

Governing body of tennis in Africa

Confederation of African Tennis Confédération Africaine de tennis
- Member nations of the Confederation of African Tennis
- Sport: Tennis
- Jurisdiction: Regional
- Abbreviation: (CAT)
- Founded: 1973
- Affiliation: International Tennis Federation
- Headquarters: Confederation of African Tennis
- Location: B.P 315 El Menzah 1004 Tunis, Tunisia
- President: (Tunisia) Tarak Cherif
- CEO: (Tunisia) Hichem Riani

Official website
- www.cattennis.com

Confederation of African Tennis (CAT) (French: Confédération Africaine de tennis) is the continental governing body of tennis in Africa. It is the non-profit private organization based in Tunis and affiliated with International Tennis Federation. The main aim of the CAT is to regulate the rules of tennis in the African continent, to develop the fundamental infrastructures for the sport, and to popularize it throughout the continent. For this, CAT also recognizes the excellence of professionals in the field of tennis, including players and member associations with awards and accolades. It is the largest regional body of the tennis with 50 member countries. English and French are the official languages of the organization. According to CAT, African continent is divided into five different zones on the geographical basis with each zone has its own zonal head.

== Affiliated Members ==
CAT is the largest regional recognizing body of the tennis with 52 members. This is the list of all the members of CAT, recognized by it as the representative of their respective country.

Country	Association
Zone I - North Africa	
Algeria	Fédération Algerienne de Tennis (FAT)
Egypt	Egyptian Tennis Federation (ETF)
Libya	Libyan Arab Tennis & Squash Federation (LATSF)
Mauritania	Fédération Mauritanienne de Tennis (FMT)
Morocco	Royal Moroccan Tennis Federation (FRMT)
Tunisia	Fédération Tunisienne de Tennis (FTT)
Zone II - West Africa	
Benin	Fédération Beninoise de Lawn Tennis
Burkina Faso	Fédération Burkinabé de Tennis
Cape Verde	Federacao Cabo Verdinana de Tennis
Ivory Coast	Fédération Ivoirienne de Tennis
Gambia	Gambia Lawn Tennis Association
Ghana	Ghana Tennis Association
Guinea-Bissau	Federaçao de Tenis da Guiné-Bissau
Guinea	Fédération Guineenne de Tennis
Liberia	Liberia Tennis Association
Mali	Fédération Malienne de Tennis
Niger	Fédération Nigérienne de Tennis
Nigeria	Nigeria Tennis Federation
Senegal	Fédération Senegalaise de Tennis
Sierra Leone	Sierra Leone Lawn Tennis Association
Togo	Fédération Togolaise de Tennis
Zone III - Central Africa	
Cameroon	Fédération Camerounaise de Tennis
Central African Republic	Fédération Centrafricaine de Tennis
Republic of the Congo	Fédération Congolaise de Lawn Tennis
Democratic Republic of the Congo	Fédération Congolaise Démocratique
Gabon	Fédération Gabonaise de Tennis
Equatorial Guinea	Federation Ecuatuaguineana de Tenis
Zone IV - East Africa	
Burundi	Fédération de Tennis du Burundi
Chad	Fédération Tchadienne de Tennis
Comoros	Fédération Comorienne de Tennis
Djibouti	Fédération Djiboutienne de Tennis
Eritrea	Eritrean Tennis Federation
Ethiopia	Ethiopian Tennis Federation
Kenya	Tennis Kenya
Rwanda	Fédération Rwandaise de Tennis
Seychelles	Seychelles Tennis Association
Somalia	Somali Tennis Association
Sudan	Sudan Lawn Tennis Association
Tanzania	Tanzania Tennis Association
Uganda	Uganda Tennis Association
Zone V - Southern Africa	
Angola	Federacao Angolana de Tenis
Botswana	Botswana Tennis Association
Lesotho	Lesotho Lawn Tennis Association
Madagascar	Fédération Malgache de Tennis
Malawi	Lawn Tennis Association of Malawi
Mauritius	Mauritius Tennis Federation
Mozambique	Federacao Mocambicana de Tenis
Namibia	Namibia Tennis Association
South Africa	South African Tennis Association
Eswatini	Eswatini National Tennis Association
Zambia	Zambia Lawn Tennis Association
Zimbabwe	Tennis Zimbabwe

== Competitions ==
- Africa Tennis Nations Cup
