= Warren Carne =

Zimbabwean cyclist

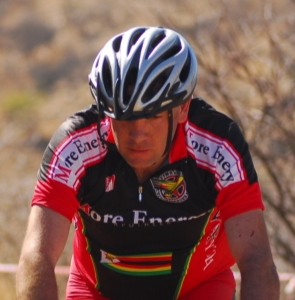
- Carne at the 2007 African Mountain Bike Championships

Personal information
- Full name: Warren James Carne
- Nickname: Woz
- Born: 14 October 1975 (age 51) Bulawayo, Rhodesia
- Height: 1.75 m (5 ft 9 in)

Cycling career
- Sport: Cycling
- Current team: Retired
- Discipline: Mountain bike racing
- Rider type: Cross-country cycling

Professional team
- 2005 - 2007: Zimbabwe

Warren James Carne (born 14 October 1975) is a former Zimbabwean cyclist.

== Early years ==
His family relocated to South Africa from Zimbabwe in the mid 1980s with Carne attending Potchefstroom Boys High. He graduated from the same class as the South African Boxer Sean Santana and Olympic 800 metre runner Hezekiél Sepeng.

== Cycling career ==
During his early years he ventured into time trialing on the road as a junior before shifting his focus to mountain biking. A noteworthy achievement during this time was his 12th-place finish at the 2005 Zimbabwean National XC Championships which took place in Harare. Carne was a member of the Zimbabwe team that competed at the inaugural 2007 UCI African Mountain Bike Championships that were contested in Windhoek, Namibia.

- Carne & Timothy Jones, who raced at the 2001 Giro d'Italia share the same grandfather.

== Career highlights ==
2005

12th Zimbabwean National Mountain Bike Championships, Harare (ZIM)

10th Gauteng & North Gauteng Interprovincial, Johannesburg (RSA)

2007

Member of the Zimbabwe cycling team that competed at the African Mountainbike Championship held in Windhoek (NAM)

== See also ==
- Zimbabwe Cycling Federation
- Union Cycliste Internationale

2007 Zimbabwe National Mountain Bike Squad
Wayne Davidson, Warren Carne, Margie Gibson, Wonder Matenje, Trevor Volker, Antipas Kwari, Byron Munyoro, Lee Mc Nab, Prince Ngundu
