= Cycling at the 2008 Summer Olympics – Qualification =

== Summary ==
Legend

- TS — Team sprint
- KE — Keirin
- SP — Sprint
- TP — Team pursuit
- IP — Individual pursuit
- MA — Madison
- PR — Points race
- RR — Road race
- TT — Individual time trial
- Q — Quotas
- R — Riders

| Nation | Track | | | | | | | | | | Road | | | | MTB | | BMX | | Total | |
| Nation | Men | | | | | | | Women | | | Men | | Women | | M | W | M | W | Q | R |
| Nation | TS | KE | SP | TP | IP | MA | PR | SP | IP | PR | RR | TT | RR | TT | M | W | M | W | Q | R |
|---|---|---|---|---|---|---|---|---|---|---|---|---|---|---|---|---|---|---|---|---|
| Algeria | | | | | | | | | | | 1 | | | | | | | | 1 | 1 |
| Argentina | | | | | | X | 1 | | | | 3 | 1 | | | 1 | | 2 | 2 | 11 | 10 |
| Australia | X | 2 | 2 | X | 2 | | 1 | 1 | 1 | 1 | 5 | 2 | 3 | 1 | 1 | 1 | 3 | 2 | 30 | 28 |
| Austria | | | | | | | | | | | 2 | | 2 | 1 | 1 | 1 | | | 7 | 6 |
| Belarus | | | | | | | 1 | 1 | | | 3 | 1 | | | | | | | 6 | 5 |
| Belgium | | | | | | X | 1 | | | | 5 | 1 | 1 | | 3 | | | | 12 | 11 |
| Brazil | | | | | | | | | | | 2 | | 1 | | 1 | 1 | | | 5 | 5 |
| Bulgaria | | | | | | | | | | | 2 | | | | | | | | 2 | 2 |
| Canada | | | | | | X | 1 | | | 1 | 3 | 2 | 3 | 1 | 2 | 2 | 1 | 1 | 18 | 15 |
| Chile | | | | | | | 1 | | | | 2 | | | | 1 | 1 | | | 5 | 5 |
| China | X | 1 | 1 | | | | | 1 | | 1 | 1 | | 2 | 2 | 1 | 2 | | 1 | 14 | 12 |
| Chinese Taipei | | | | | | | 1 | | | | | | | | | | | | 1 | 1 |
| Colombia | | | | X | 1 | | | | 1 | 1 | 3 | 1 | | | 1 | | 3 | | 12 | 13 |
| Costa Rica | | | | | | | | | | | 1 | | | | 1 | | | | 2 | 2 |
| Croatia | | | | | | | | | | | 3 | 1 | | | | | | | 4 | 3 |
| Cuba | | | | | | | | 1 | | 1 | 1 | | 1 | | | | | | 4 | 4 |
| Czech Republic | X | 1 | 1 | | | X | 1 | | 1 | 1 | 2 | | | | 1 | 1 | 1 | 1 | 13 | 12 |
| Denmark | | | | X | | X | 1 | | | 1 | 3 | 2 | 1 | 1 | 2 | | 1 | 1 | 15 | 15 |
| Ecuador | | | | | | | | | | | | | | | | | 1 | | 1 | 1 |
| El Salvador | | | | | | | | | 1 | 1 | 1 | | | | | | | | 3 | 2 |
| Estonia | | | 1 | | | | | | | | 2 | 1 | 1 | | | | | | 5 | 4 |
| France | X | 2 | 2 | X | 1 | X | 1 | 1 | | 1 | 5 | | 3 | 2 | 3 | 1 | 2 | 2 | 29 | 28 |
| Germany | X | 2 | 2 | | | X | 1 | | 1 | 1 | 5 | 2 | 3 | 2 | 3 | 2 | | | 26 | 20 |
| Great Britain | X | 2 | 2 | X | 2 | X | 1 | 1 | 2 | 1 | 4 | 1 | 3 | 2 | 2 | | 1 | 1 | 28 | 25 |
| Greece | X | 2 | 1 | | | | | | | | | | | | | | | | 4 | 4 |
| Hong Kong | | | | | | | 1 | | | 1 | 1 | | | | 1 | | | | 4 | 4 |
| Hungary | | | | | | | | | | | 2 | 1 | | | 1 | | 1 | 1 | 6 | 5 |
| Iran | | | | | | | | | | | 3 | 1 | | | | | | | 4 | 3 |
| Ireland | | | | | 1 | | | | | | 2 | | | | 1 | | | | 4 | 4 |
| Italy | | 1 | 1 | | | X | 1 | | | 1 | 5 | 2 | 3 | 1 | 2 | 1 | 1 | | 20 | 15 |
| Jamaica | | 1 | | | | | | | | | | | | | | | | | 1 | 1 |
| Japan | X | 2 | 2 | | | | 1 | 1 | | 1 | 2 | 1 | 1 | | 1 | 1 | 1 | | 15 | 14 |
| Kazakhstan | | | | | | | | | | | 2 | 1 | 1 | 1 | | | | | 5 | 3 |
| Latvia | | | | | | | | | | | 2 | 1 | | | | | 3 | | 6 | 5 |
| Libya | | | | | | | | | | | 1 | | | | | | | | 1 | 1 |
| Lithuania | | | | | | | | 1 | 2 | 1 | 2 | | 3 | 1 | | | | | 10 | 8 |
| Luxembourg | | | | | | | | | | | 3 | 1 | | | | | | | 4 | 3 |
| Malaysia | X | 2 | 1 | | | | | | | | | | | | | | | | 4 | 3 |
| Mauritius | | | | | | | | | | | | | 1 | | | | | | 1 | 1 |
| Mexico | | | | | | | | | | | 1 | | 1 | | | | | | 2 | 2 |
| Moldova | | | | | 1 | | | | | | 1 | | | | | | | | 2 | 1 |
| Namibia | | | | | | | | | | | 1 | | | | 1 | | | | 2 | 2 |
| Netherlands | X | 2 | 2 | X | 2 | X | 1 | 2 | | 1 | 5 | 2 | 3 | 2 | 2 | 1 | 3 | 1 | 32 | 27 |
| New Zealand | | | | X | 1 | X | 1 | | 1 | 1 | 3 | | 2 | | 1 | 1 | 1 | 1 | 15 | 17 |
| Norway | | | | | | | | | | | 4 | | 1 | | | 2 | 1 | | 8 | 8 |
| Poland | X | 1 | 1 | | | | 1 | | | | 3 | 1 | 1 | | 1 | 2 | | | 12 | 11 |
| Portugal | | | | | | | | | | | 2 | | | | | | | | 2 | 2 |
| Russia | X | 2 | 1 | X | 2 | X | 1 | 1 | | 1 | 5 | 2 | 3 | 1 | 1 | 2 | | | 25 | 22 |
| Serbia | | | | | | | | | | | 2 | | | | | | | | 2 | 2 |
| Slovakia | | | | | | | | | | | 3 | 1 | | | | 1 | | | 5 | 4 |
| Slovenia | | | | | | | | | | | 4 | 1 | 1 | | | 1 | | | 7 | 6 |
| South Africa | | | | | | | | | | | 3 | 1 | 2 | | 1 | 1 | 1 | | 9 | 8 |
| South Korea | | | | | | | | | | 1 | 1 | | 2 | | | | | | 4 | 4 |
| Spain | | | | X | 2 | X | 1 | | | 1 | 5 | 2 | 2 | 1 | 3 | 1 | | | 20 | 19 |
| Sweden | | | | | | | | | | | 3 | 1 | 3 | 2 | 2 | | | | 11 | 8 |
| Switzerland | | | | | | X | | | 1 | | 1 | 1 | 3 | 2 | 3 | 2 | 1 | 1 | 16 | 14 |
| Thailand | | | | | | | | | | | | | 1 | | | | | | 1 | 1 |
| Tunisia | | | | | | | | | | | 1 | | | | | | | | 1 | 1 |
| Turkey | | | | | | | | | | | | | | | 1 | | | | 1 | 1 |
| Ukraine | | 1 | | X | 2 | X | 1 | | 1 | 1 | 4 | 2 | 3 | | 1 | | | | 18 | 16 |
| United States | X | 1 | 1 | | 1 | X | 1 | 1 | 1 | 1 | 5 | 2 | 3 | 2 | 2 | 2 | 3 | 1 | 29 | 24 |
| Uruguay | | | | | | | 1 | | | | | | | | | | | | 1 | 1 |
| Uzbekistan | | | | | | | | | | | 1 | | | | | | | | 1 | 1 |
| Venezuela | | | | | | | | | | | 1 | | 2 | | | | 1 | | 4 | 4 |
| Zimbabwe | | | | | | | | | | | | | | | 1 | | | | 1 | 1 |
| Total: 65 NOCs | 13 | 25 | 21 | 10 | 18 | 16 | 23 | 12 | 13 | 22 | 143 | 39 | 66 | 25 | 50 | 30 | 32 | 16 | 574 | 511 |

== Qualification timeline ==
| Event | Date | Venue |
Track
| 2007 UCI "B" World Championships | 26 June – 1 July 2007 | (South Africa) Cape Town |
| 2007–08 UCI Track World Cup | November 2007 – February 2008 | - |
| 2008 UCI Track World Championships | 26–30 March 2008 | (United Kingdom) Manchester |
| UCI Track World Ranking | 30 March 2008 | - |
Road
| 2007 UCI "B" World Championships | 26 June – 1 July 2007 | (South Africa) Cape Town |
| 2007 UCI Road World Championships | 25–30 September 2007 | (Germany) Stuttgart |
| 2007 UCI ProTour | 30 October 2007 | - |
| 2006–2007 UCI Africa Tour | 30 October 2007 | - |
| 2006–2007 UCI America Tour | 30 October 2007 | - |
| 2006–2007 UCI Asia Tour | 30 October 2007 | - |
| 2006–2007 UCI Europe Tour | 30 October 2007 | - |
| 2006–2007 UCI Oceania Tour | 30 October 2007 | - |
| 2008 UCI Women's World Cup | 1 June 2008 | - |
Mountainbike
| 2007 Pan American Championships | 8–11 March 2007 | (Argentina) Villa la Angostura |
| 2007 Oceania Championships | 23–25 March 2007 | (Australia) Thredbo |
| 2007 African Championships | 28–29 July 2007 | (Namibia) Windhoek |
| 2007 Asian Championships | 4–5 August 2007 | (China) Suzhou |
| UCI ranking by nation | 31 December 2007 | - |
BMX
| 2008 UCI BMX World Championships | 29 May – 1 June 2008 | (China) Taiyuan |
| UCI ranking by nation | 31 May 2008 | - |

== Track ==
A National Olympic Committee (NOC) may enter up to 2 athletes in each individual event, except points race where it can enter only 1 athlete. NOC may also enter up to 1 team in each team event.

Champions in the World Championship, World Cup, and "B" World Championship automatically qualify (Nontransferable place), as do several of the athletes with the highest UCI rankings in their event on 30 March 2008. Additionally, the tripartite commission (made up of the IOC, UCI and ANOC) may issue invitational places.

=== Men's sprint ===
| Event | Team sprint | Keirin | Sprint |
|---|---|---|---|
| World Championships | France | (United Kingdom) Chris Hoy | (United Kingdom) Chris Hoy |
| World Cup | -* | -* | (France) Kévin Sireau |
| "B" World Championships | – | ~~(South Africa) Gadi Chait~~ | (Estonia) Daniel Novikov |
| UCI ranking | Australia; Netherlands; Great Britain; China; Germany; Greece; Russia; Japan; Malaysia; United States; Czech Republic; Poland* | (France) Arnaud Tournant (Netherlands) Teun Mulder (Greece) Christos Volikakis (Australia) Ryan Bayley (Italy) Roberto Chiappa (Japan) Toshiaki Fushimi (Germany) Carsten Bergemann (Malaysia) Josiah Ng Onn Lam (Jamaica) Ricardo Lynch (Russia) Sergey Borisov* (Ukraine) Andriy Vynokurov** | (Italy) Roberto Chiappa (Australia) Ryan Bayley (Japan) Kazunari Watanabe (Netherlands) Theo Bos (Germany) Maximilian Levy |
| 1 rider from each qualified sprint team | – | France; Australia; Netherlands; Great Britain; China; Germany; Greece; Russia; Japan; Malaysia; United States; Czech Republic; Poland | France; Australia; Netherlands; Great Britain; China; Germany; Greece; Russia; Japan; Malaysia; United States; Czech Republic; Poland |
| Total | 13 | 25 | 21 |

* Since World Cup leader qualified through World Championships, the next competitor from the world rankings qualify.

** South Africa replaced by the next competitor from the world rankings

=== Men's pursuit ===
| Event | Team pursuit | Individual pursuit |
|---|---|---|
| World Championships | Great Britain | (United Kingdom) Bradley Wiggins |
| World Cup | -* | (Ukraine) Volodymyr Dyudya |
| "B" World Championships | – | (Moldova) Alexandre Pliușchin |
| UCI ranking | Denmark; Australia; New Zealand; Netherlands; Spain; Ukraine; Russia; France; Colombia* | (Netherlands) Jenning Huizenga (United States) Taylor Phinney (Australia) Phillip Thuaux (Spain) Sergi Escobar Roure (Russia) Alexander Serov (Republic of Ireland) David O'Loughlin |
| 1 rider from each qualified pursuit team | – | Great Britain; ~~Denmark~~; Australia; New Zealand; Netherlands; Spain; Ukraine; Russia; France; Colombia |
| Total | 10 | 18 |

* Since World Cup leader qualified through World Championships, the next competitor from the world rankings qualify.

=== Men's points ===
| Event | Madison | Points race |
|---|---|---|
| World Championships | Great Britain | (Belarus) Vasil Kiryienka |
| World Cup | Denmark | (United Kingdom) Chris Newton |
| "B" World Championships | – | ~~(Bulgaria) Radoslav Konstantinov~~* |
| UCI ranking | Belgium; Switzerland; Netherlands; Germany; United States; Italy; Spain; Argentina; Russia; France; Czech Republic; New Zealand; Ukraine; Canada | (Australia) Cameron Meyer (Poland) Rafał Ratajczyk (Japan) Makoto Iijima (Hong Kong) Wong Kam-po (Uruguay) Milton Wynants Vazquez (Chile) Marco Arriagada (Chinese Taipei) Feng Chun-kai* |
| 1 rider from each qualified madison team | – | Denmark; Belgium; ~~Switzerland~~; Netherlands; Germany; United States; Italy; Spain; Argentina; Russia; France; Czech Republic; New Zealand; Ukraine; Canada |
| Total | 16 | 23 |

* Bulgaria replaced by the next competitor from the world rankings

=== Women ===
| Event | Sprint | Individual pursuit | Points race |
|---|---|---|---|
| World Championships | (United Kingdom) Victoria Pendleton | (United Kingdom) Rebecca Romero | (Netherlands) Marianne Vos |
| World Cup | (Netherlands) Willy Kanis | (Lithuania) Vilija Sereikaitė | (China) Li Yan |
| "B" World Championships | (Japan) Sakie Tsukuda | (El Salvador) Evelyn García | (Japan) Satomi Wadami |
| UCI ranking | (United States) Jennie Reed (Netherlands) Willy Kanis (France) Clara Sanchez (Lithuania) Simona Krupeckaitė (China) Guo Shuang (Cuba) Lisandra Guerra (Belarus) Natallia Tsylinskaya (Australia) Anna Meares (Russia) Svetlana Grankovskaya | (United Kingdom) Rebecca Romero (United States) Sarah Hammer (Lithuania) Vilija Sereikaitė (Ukraine) Lesya Kalytovska (Australia) Katie Mactier (Colombia) María Luisa Calle (New Zealand) Alison Shanks (Czech Republic) Lada Kozlíková (Germany) Verena Joos (Switzerland) Karin Thürig | (Italy) Vera Carrara (Cuba) Yoanka González (Hong Kong) Wong Wan Yiu (Spain) Leire Olaberria (Denmark) Trine Schmidt (Russia) Olga Slyusareva (France) Pascale Jeuland (Canada) Gina Grain (South Korea) Lee Min-Hye; ~~(Mexico) Belem Guerrero~~ |
| all individual pursuit competitors | – | – | (United Kingdom) Rebecca Romero (Lithuania) Vilija Sereikaitė (El Salvador) Evelyn García (United States) Sarah Hammer (Ukraine) Lesya Kalytovska (Australia) Katie Mactier (Colombia) María Luisa Calle (New Zealand) Alison Shanks (Czech Republic) Lada Kozlíková (Germany) Verena Joos; ~~(Switzerland) Karin Thürig~~ |
| Total | 12 | 13 | 22 |

== Road ==
An NOC may enter up to 5 men and 3 women if qualified through the UCI ranking. Otherwise it may enter up to 2 men and 2 women. Each NOC will receive athlete quota places according to the UCI ranking by nations in the tours. Also, each NOC with a rider in individual ranking in the Pro Tour and in the corresponding top places in continental tours will receive 1 place if not qualified through Nations Ranking. Places for the time trial event are included in the total quota for cycling disciplines. Only riders involved in the road, track or mountain biking or BMX can take part in the individual time trial race.

=== Men's road race ===
| Event | Ranking by nation | Qualified | Athletes per NOC |
|---|---|---|---|
| UCI ProTour | 1 to 10 | Spain; Italy; Australia; Russia; Germany; Netherlands; Belgium; United States; France | 5 |
| UCI ProTour | 1 to 10 | Luxembourg | 3* |
| UCI ProTour | 11 to 15 | Great Britain; Slovenia; Norway; Ukraine | 4 |
| UCI ProTour | 11 to 15 | Sweden | 3** |
| UCI ProTour | all ranked individuals | (China) Li Fuyu | 1** |
| UCI Africa Tour | 1st | South Africa | 3 |
| UCI Africa Tour | 2nd | Tunisia | 1** |
| UCI Africa Tour | individual top 5 | (Libya) Mohamed Ali Ahmed | 1** |
| UCI America Tour | 1 to 3 | Argentina; Canada; Colombia | 3 |
| UCI America Tour | 4 to 6 | Brazil | 2 |
| UCI America Tour | 4 to 6 | Venezuela; Mexico | 1** |
| UCI America Tour | individual top 20 | (Costa Rica) Henry Raabe (Cuba) Pedro Pablo Pérez | 1** |
| UCI Asia Tour | 1st | Iran | 3 |
| UCI Asia Tour | 2 to 4 | Japan; Kazakhstan | 2 |
| UCI Asia Tour | 2 to 4 | Hong Kong | 1** |
| UCI Asia Tour | individual top 5 | (South Korea) Park Sung-Baek | 1** |
| UCI Europe Tour | 1 to 6 | Poland; Portugal***; Slovakia; Croatia; Denmark; Belarus | 3 |
| UCI Europe Tour | 7 to 16 | Austria; Estonia; Lithuania; Switzerland****; Bulgaria; Czech Republic; Latvia; Serbia; Hungary; Ireland | 2 |
| UCI Oceania Tour | 1st | New Zealand | 3 |
| "B" World Championships | individual top 5 | (Namibia) Erik Hoffmann (Moldova) Alexandre Pliușchin (Algeria) Hichem Chaabane (Chile) Richard Rodríguez (Uzbekistan) Vladimir Tuychiev (Chile) Francisco Cabrera* (El Salvador) Mario Contreras* | Up to 2 |
| Total | | | 143 |

* Teams could qualify only the number of riders that they have in the corresponding tour. Luxembourg only qualified 3 riders in the pro tour. The left over places were taken by teams from the "B" World Championships.

** In tours where individual riders qualified, the teams that qualified more than one athlete lost quota places in order to maintain the overall quotas. Sweden, Tunisia, Venezuela, Mexico and Hong Kong all lost 1 quota place to China, Libya, Costa Rica, Cuba and South Korea respectively.

*** Portugal had 3 quota places, but chose to use only two.

**** Switzerland had 2 quota places, but chose to use only one.

=== Men's individual time trial ===
| Event | Ranking by nation | Qualified | Athletes per NOC |
|---|---|---|---|
| UCI ProTour | 1 to 10 | Spain; Italy; Australia; Russia; Luxembourg; Germany; Netherlands; Belgium; United States; ~~France~~ | 1 |
| UCI Africa Tour | 1st | South Africa | 1 |
| UCI America Tour | 1 to 4 | Argentina; Canada; ~~Brazil~~; Colombia | 1 |
| UCI Asia Tour | 1st and 2nd | Iran; Japan | 1 |
| UCI Europe Tour | 1 to 7 | Poland; Slovenia; Slovakia; Croatia; Denmark; Ukraine; Estonia | 1 |
| UCI Oceania Tour | 1st | ~~New Zealand~~ | 1 |
| World Championships | individual top 15 | (Switzerland) Fabian Cancellara (Hungary) László Bodrogi (Netherlands) Stef Clement (Germany) Bert Grabsch (Russia) Vladimir Gusev (Spain) Iván Gutiérrez (Kazakhstan) Andrey Mizurov (Belarus) Vasili Kyrienka (United Kingdom) Bradley Wiggins (United States) David Zabriskie (Latvia) Raivis Belohvoščiks (Italy) Marco Pinotti (Sweden) Gustav Larsson (Ukraine) Andriy Hrivko (Canada) Ryder Hesjedal (Denmark) Brian Vandborg (Australia) Ben Day | 1 |
| Total | | | 39 |

=== Women's road race ===
| Event | Ranking by nation | Qualified | Athletes per NOC |
|---|---|---|---|
| World Tour Rankings | 1 to 16 | Netherlands; Germany; Italy; United States; Australia; Sweden; Switzerland; Lithuania; Great Britain; France; Russia; Austria**; Spain**; Canada; China**; Ukraine | 3 |
| World Tour Rankings | 17 to 24 | Venezuela; South Africa; New Zealand | 2 |
| World Tour Rankings | 17 to 24 | Belgium; Japan; Mexico; Brazil; Denmark | 1* |
| World Tour Rankings | individual top 100 | (Estonia) Grete Treier (Cuba) Yumari González Valdivieso (Poland) Maja Włoszczowska (Norway) Anita Valen-De Vries (Slovenia) Sigrid Corneo (Kazakhstan) Zulfiya Zabirova | 1* |
| "B" World Championships | individual top 3 | (South Korea) Sung Eun-Go (South Korea) Hae Ok-Jeong (Thailand) Thatsani Wichana | Up to 2 |
| Invitation places | 1 | Mauritius | |
| Total | | | 66 |

* As other quota places are awarded to ranked athletes, the quota places for the ranked NOCs will be decreased to keep the total number of athletes constant.

** Austria, China and Spain had 3 quota places, but chose to use only two.

=== Women's individual time trial ===
| Event | Ranking by nation | Qualified | Athletes per NOC |
|---|---|---|---|
| World Tour Rankings | 1 to 15 | Netherlands; Germany; Italy; United States; Australia; Sweden; Switzerland; Lithuania; Great Britain; France; Russia; Austria; Spain; Canada; China | 1 |
| World Championships | individual top 10 | (Germany) Hanka Kupfernagel (United States) Kristin Armstrong (Switzerland) Priska Doppmann (France) Jeannie Longo-Ciprelli (United Kingdom) Emma Pooley (China) Li Meifang (Netherlands) Mirjam Melchers-Van Poppel (Kazakhstan) Zulfiya Zabirova (Sweden) Susanne Ljungskog (Denmark) Trine Schmidt | 1 |
| Total | | | 25 |

== Mountainbike ==
An NOC may enter up to 3 men and 2 women athletes.

=== Men ===
| Mountainbike men | Ranking by nation | Qualified | Athletes per NOC |
|---|---|---|---|
| UCI ranking by nation | 1 to 5 | France; Switzerland; Spain; Belgium; Germany | 3 |
| UCI ranking by nation | 6 to 13 | United States; Netherlands; Sweden; Canada; Austria**; Denmark; Italy; Great Britain | 2 |
| UCI ranking by nation | 14 to 24 | Czech Republic; New Zealand; Australia; Poland; Russia; Colombia; Ukraine; Brazil; Chile; South Africa; Ireland; Hungary*; Turkey*; Japan** | 1 |
| African Championships | individual top 2 | (Namibia) Mannie Heymans (Zimbabwe) Antipas Kwari | 1 |
| American Championships | individual top 2 | (Argentina) Luciano Caracioli (Costa Rica) Paolo Montolla Castillo | 1 |
| Asian Championships | individual top 2 | (China) Ji Junhua (Hong Kong) Chan Chun Hing | 1 |
| Oceania Championships | individual top 2* | | 1 |
| Total | | | 50 |

* Since both Australia and New Zealand (the only competitors in the Oceania continental championships) qualified through world rankings, the next two competitors from the world rankings (Hungary and Turkey) qualified a single rider.

** Austria had 2 quota places, but chose to use only one and the next competitor from the world rankings (Japan) qualified a single rider

=== Women ===
| Mountainbike women | Ranking by nation | Qualified | Athletes per NOC |
|---|---|---|---|
| UCI ranking by nation | 1 to 8 | China; Germany; United States; Canada; Norway; Poland; Russia; Switzerland | 2 |
| UCI ranking by nation | 9 to 18 | France; Czech Republic; Spain; Slovenia; Netherlands; Austria; New Zealand; Italy; Brazil; Slovakia | 1 |
| African Championships | individual 1st | (South Africa) Yolande Speedy | 1 |
| American Championship | individual 1st | (Chile) Francisca Campos | 1 |
| Asian Championship | individual 1st | (Japan) Rie Katayama | 1 |
| Oceania Championship | individual 1st | (Australia) Tory Thomas | 1 |
| Total | | | 30 |

== BMX ==
An NOC may enter up to 3 men and 2 women if qualified through the UCI ranking. Otherwise it may enter up to 1 man and 1 woman.

=== Men ===
| Event | Ranking by nation | Qualified | Athletes per NOC |
|---|---|---|---|
| UCI ranking by nation | 1 to 5 | United States; Australia; Latvia; Netherlands; Colombia | 3 |
| UCI ranking by nation | 6 to 8 | France; Argentina; New Zealand* | 2 |
| UCI ranking by nation | 9 to 11 | Czech Republic; Venezuela; Ecuador | 1 |
| UCI World Championship | 1 to 6 | South Africa; Italy; Great Britain; Switzerland; Denmark; Canada; Norway**; Hungary**; Japan** | 1 |
| Invitation places | ~~2~~ | - | ~~1~~ |
| Total | | | 32 |

* New Zealand had 2 quota places, but chose to use only one.

** The left over places were taken by teams from the World Championships.

=== Women ===
| Event | Ranking by nation | Qualified | Athletes per NOC |
|---|---|---|---|
| UCI ranking by nation | 1 to 4 | France; New Zealand*; Australia; Argentina | 2 |
| UCI ranking by nation | 5 to 8 | Czech Republic; United States; Netherlands; Canada | 1 |
| UCI World Championship | 1 to 3 | Great Britain; Denmark; Switzerland; Hungary** | 1 |
| Invitation places | 1 | China | 1 |
| Total | | | 16 |

* New Zealand had 2 quota places, but chose to use only one.

** The left over places were taken by teams from the World Championships.
