= Time trial =

Race where athletes compete to be the fastest

In many racing sports, an athlete (or occasionally a team of athletes) will compete in a time trial (TT) against the clock to secure the fastest time. The format of a time trial can vary, but usually follow a format where each athlete or team sets off at a predetermined interval to set the fastest time on a course.

Time trial "Souvenir Stefan Götz" at the 2nd ICFF, Marbeck, Germany, September 2007

== Cycling ==
In cycling, for example, a time trial can be a single track cycling event, or an individual or team time trial on the road, and either or both of the latter may form components of multi-day stage races. In contrast to other types of races, athletes race alone since they are sent out in intervals (interval starts), as opposed to a mass start. Time trialist will often seek to maintain marginal aerodynamic gains as the races are often won or lost by a couple of seconds.

== Skiing ==
In cross-country skiing and biathlon competitions, skiers are sent out in 30 to 60 second intervals.

== Rowing ==
In rowing, time trial races, where the boats are sent out at 10 to 20 second intervals, are usually called "head races." Head races are typically held in the fall, winter and spring seasons. These events draw many athletes as well as observers. In this form of racing, rowers race against the clock where the crew or rower completing the course in the shortest time in their age, ability and boat-class category is deemed the winner.

== Motorsport ==
In many forms of motorsport, a similar format is used in qualifying to determine the starting order for the main event, though multiple attempts to set the fastest time are often allowed. In rallying, the special stages are run in a time-trial format. Other forms of time trials in motorsport include hill-climbing and qualifying. A similar race against the clock or time attack is often part of racing video games.

Time attack is a type of motorsport in which the racers compete for the best lap time. Each vehicle is timed through numerous circuits of the track. The racers make a preliminary circuit, then run the timed laps, and then finish with a cool-down lap. Time attack and time trial events differ by competition format and rules. Time attack has a limited number of laps, time trial has open sessions. Unlike other timed motorsport disciplines such as sprinting and hillclimbing, the car is required to start off under full rolling start conditions following a warm up lap in which they will have to accelerate out as fast as possible to determine how fast they enter their timed lap. Commonly, as the cars are modified road going cars, they are required to have tires authorized for road use.

Time attack events began in Japan in the mid-1960s. They have since spread around the world. In the United States, the Super Lap Battle is held at Buttonwillow Raceway Park since 2004. In February 2019 a new event called Superlap Battle USA was run at the Circuit of the Americas in Austin, Texas. The outright winner was Cole Powelson in the Lyfe Nissan GTR. An international event known as World Time Attack Challenge has been held at Sydney Motorsport Park, Australia since 2010 attracting the fastest time attack teams from around the globe to compete.

Europe hosts several Time Attack championships with Dutch Time Attack as one of the first, starting in June 2008. As to date this championship runs 4-6 races per year on CM.com Circuit Zandvoort, TT-circuit Assen, Nürburgring GP-Strecke (together with German Time Attack Masters) and occasional additional racetracks in Germany, Belgium or France. Dutch Time Attack is set up to host drivers from the very entry level up to full blown racecars with according drivers, divided over 5 classes.

=== United States ===
National Auto Sport Association Time Trial (NASA TT) series is a national auto competition program, utilizing regional series based on a time trial style format, with rules that establish car classifications to provide a contest of driver skill. NASA TT is designed to bridge the gap between NASA HPDE (High Performance Driving Events), and wheel-to-wheel racing.

NASA TT provides a venue for spirited on-track competition with a high degree of both safety and convenience. NASA TT competition will take place during NASA HPDE-4 sessions or in separate TT run groups, depending on the event schedule and number of participants. In addition to having a set of National NASA TT Rules, the rules, safety guidelines, and driving requirements of the HPDE-4 program apply to NASA TT. These rules can be found in the NASA CCR (Club Codes and Regs).

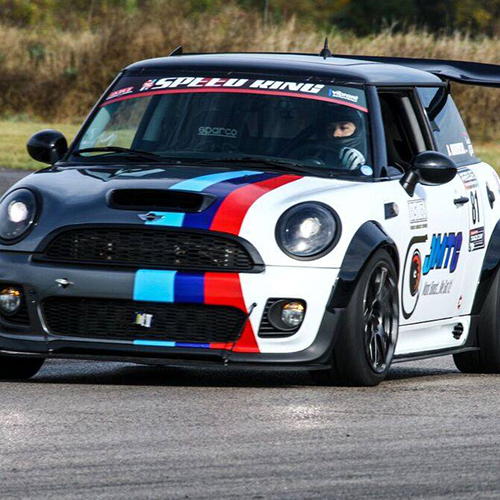
Flying Pigs Racing Street Modified FWD class Mini Cooper S. Driver Ben Marouski

Other events such as Gridlife offer a time attack event taking place in various locations across North America. The competition is divided into various groups based on car specification. The level varies from everyday driven vehicles to non road legal race cars. Each class also has its own set of rules and regulations on car specifications as the higher class one goes the less regulations one is faced with. The top 12 competitors regardless of class will participate in the Final grid event in which the driver is allowed one warm up lap, one hot lap, and one cool down lap. The hot lap, however, will not count towards the overall trackbattle event. There is also a seasonal championship with every class having a champion based on points earned throughout the season.

=== Germany ===
In Germany, the German Timeattack Masters is a time attack championship, held since 2013. It started being limited to Japanese cars only and opened up to vehicles of all makes in 2016. From 2013 to 2017 the championship consisted of four events, in 2018 that number increased to five for the overall championship.

Events are held on various racing tracks, most of them located in Germany, like the Nürburgring Grand Prix course, the Lausitzring and the Hockenheimring. Additionally, for years, the TT Circuit Assen is used in cooperation with the Dutch Time Attack Masters. Formerly, races also took place on the German course Oschersleben.

Each event consists of Warm Up, Qualifying and the Hotlap finals, with Qualifying rank and Hotlap rank counting for the overall championship. The Hotlap is only driven by the five fastest starters from the Qualifying.

Groups are split according to car specifications, mainly regarding severity of modifications and aerodynamics. With more powerful classes, safety regulations are also tighter. Classes range from Club-class, being close-to-production, via the Pro-class, with more allowed aerodynamics and allowed engine swaps, to the Extreme-class in which everything is allowed, that is not forbidden explicitly. While in lower classes a distinction between 2WD and 4WD is made, this is neglected in the Extreme-class.

The series is independent and not connected to any larger organization like the DMSB.

== Video games ==
Many computer and video games include a time trial (also known as time attack) mode, in which the main goal is to complete levels—or, in some cases, the entire game—as quickly as possible. This mode prioritizes completion time ahead of other measures of success such as high scores. In cases in which a game does not have a dedicated time attack or trial mode, a fast completion is frequently known as a speedrun.

Usually the best results achieved in a time attack mode are stored in long-term memory by the game (on a hard disk or non-volatile memory), so they can be shared with friends or improved upon at a later date. Racing games often feature "ghost cars" which are saved when the player sets a record time. In subsequent races, the ghost car follows the path the player took when setting that record, allowing them to clearly gauge how they are performing against the previous achievement. Saved ghost cars can often be shared with other players.

The inclusion of a time attack mode can often be an effective way of adding replay value to a game. Racing games may also include ghost cars recorded by the development staff—attempting to beat their times can provide a final challenge to players who have mastered the rest of the game. Often the game provides other incentives to use the time attack feature; GoldenEye 007 and Tomb Raider Anniversary encouraged players to revisit levels more than once by offering unlockable cheat options as a reward for completing them within target times.

Sometimes, the settings of a time attack mode are "locked" in order to standardize competition between players. For example, Soul Calibur features a time attack mode automatically set to two rounds for a win, the normal difficulty setting and a default time limit; but it also features an alternative Arcade mode, which allows any option settings to be used and saves record times separately.

Both speedrunning and time attacking have extensive online communities dedicated to achieving the fastest times possible, with one popular website being Speedrun.com .. Amongst the community there are many speedrunning competitions, some held annually or otherwise inaugurally, such as Games Done Quick (GDQ).

== See also ==
- Bushy Park Time Trial
- Time trialist
- Isle of Man TT
- Track time trial
- Cycling Time Trials
