= Craig Mottram =

Australian runner

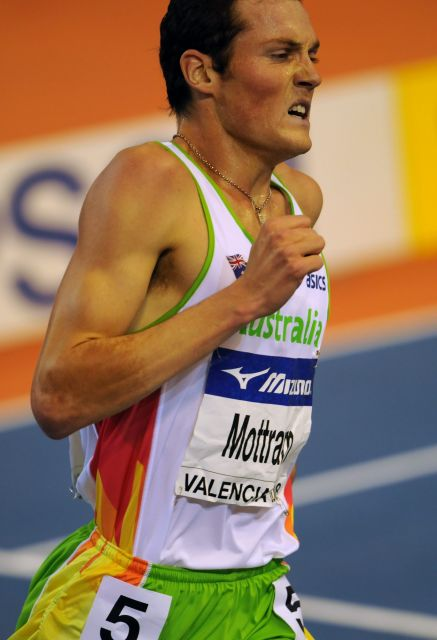
- Mottram racing at the 2008 IAAF World Indoor Championships

Personal information
- Nationality: Australian
- Born: 18 June 1980 (age 46) Frankston, Victoria, Australia
- Height: 1.88 m (6 ft 2 in)
- Weight: 75 kg (165 lb; 11.8 st)

Sport
- Country: Australia
- Sport: Athletics
- Events: 5000 metres, 3000 metres

Achievements and titles
- Personal bests: Outdoor; 1500 m: 3:33.97 (Zürich 2006); Mile: 3:48.98 (Oslo 2005); 2000 m: 4:50.76 OR (Melbourne 2006); 3000 m 7:32.19 OR (Athens 2006); 2-mile: 8:03.50 OR (Eugene 2007); 5000 m: 12:55.76 OR (London 2004); 10,000 m: 27:34.48 (Palo Alto 2008); Indoor; Mile: 3:54.81i (New York 2007); 3000 m: 7:34.50i OR (Boston 2008); Road; 5 km: 13:20 OR (Carlsbad 2005); 10 km: 27:39a NB (Madrid 2006) 27:54 (Manchester 2004); Parkrun: 14:00 (2006)
Medal record
Representing Australia
Men's athletics
World Championships
Bronze medal – third place	2005 Helsinki	5000 m
Commonwealth Games
Silver medal – second place	2006 Melbourne	5000 m
World Cup
Gold medal – first place	2006 Athens	3000 m

Craig Mottram (born 18 June 1980) is a former Australian long and middle-distance runner who specialised in the 5000 metre event.

== Early years ==
Mottram was born on 18 June 1980 in Frankston, Victoria. He attended Mentone Grammar School.

=== Career ===
At 188 cm (6 feet 2 inches), Mottram is unusually tall for a distance runner. He competed in his first Olympic Games at only 20 years of age, in the 5000 metre event at the 2000 Summer Olympics in Sydney: he did not qualify from his heat, but finished in 8th place with a respectable time of 13 minutes, 31.06 seconds. He fared better in his next Olympic competition: with four additional years of experience and athletic maturity, Mottram qualified for the final of the 5000 metre event and finished 8th with a time of 13:25.70 in Athens.

In 2005, he set a course record to win the Great Ireland Run in a third consecutive win at the competition. On 14 August 2005, he reached a career highlight, coming third in the 5000 m event at the 2005 World Championships in Athletics in Helsinki, running the event in 13 minutes, 32.96 seconds. He was the last non-African born runner to receive a medal in that event until Jakob Ingebrigtsen received gold in 2022.

On 9 March 2006 in Melbourne, in his final warmup event before the 2006 Commonwealth Games, Mottram took ten seconds off the 12-year-old Australian record for the 2000 metres. This distance, not often run at IAAF events, was scheduled specifically to suit Mottram's Games preparation.

On 20 March 2006 at the Commonwealth Games, Mottram came second in the 5000 m event with a time of 12 minutes, 58.19 seconds, beaten narrowly by Kenyan runner Augustine Choge. This race was only the second time that this event was won in under 13 minutes at a championship competition (first one being 2003 World Athletics Championships.) Mottram also ran in the 1500 m event in Melbourne on 25 March 2006, entering the competition as favourite to win. Having worked his way into third position during the race, Mottram was accidentally tripped at the 800-metre mark when English athlete Andrew Baddeley fell behind him, clipping Mottram's heel. Mottram lost 20 metres on the field due to the incident and finished in ninth position.

In June 2006 Mottram set the Parkrun 5 km world record time with 14 minutes and 0 seconds at Bushy Parkrun; he held the record until 2012.

He is a supporter of English Premier League club Sunderland and ran in the Great North Run 2006, wearing a Sunderland shirt.

On 21 December 2006, Mottram set the record for the Tan in a time of 10:08:00. The Tan is Melbourne's most iconic running track, located around the Royal Botanic Gardens. Mottram beat the previous best time of 10:12, also his own, during a Richmond Tigers Football Club trial.

In 2007 Mottram started the year on a high, dominating "the Kenyan Hope" of Boniface Songkok at the Telstra A series in Melbourne. The race was a conservative one before Craig tore the field open with a quick 7th lap before a devastating final 400 m run in 53 seconds. At the Prefontaine Classic In Eugene (Oregon), Craig ran the 5th fastest 2-mile of all time in 8:03.50 leaving in his wake the likes Alan Webb, Tariku Bekele, Matt Tegenkemp, Dathan Ritzenhein and other American hopefuls. "It comes down to the size of your balls," Mottram said of his ability to pick up the pace and shake off his rivals in Oregon. After a good start to the season Craig suffered a hamstring strain. This affected his training for the World Championships, where he finished 11th.

2008 was an up-and-down season for Mottram. He won the Melbourne Grand Prix 5000 m and the National Championship 5000 m and 3000 m. He then competed at the 2008 Indoor Championships in Valencia, where he placed 5th in the final. He then contested the Boston Indoor Grand Prix where he won the 3000 m and broke the meet record of Haile Gebrselassie. He hit form after he won the Stockholm Grand Prix 3000 m and placed 4th in the 1 Mile. He also ran a 3:57.90-mile finishing 2nd to Bernard Lagat at the prestigious Millrose games in February 2008.

At the 2008 Summer Olympics in Beijing, Mottram placed 5th in the first heat of the 5000 m in 13min 44.39sec and did not advance to the final. Following this disappointment, Mottram split from coach Nick Bideau, choosing to self-coach.

Due to injuries, he did not compete in the 2009 IAAF World Championships in Athletics in Berlin. That year, after having run for Nike for all of his professional career, Mottram signed a contract with Adidas. He also accepted a coaching offer from Australian distance running coach Chris Wardlaw, who has coached marathon runner Steve Moneghetti among others.

In late November 2009 Craig Mottram made a return from his 12-month absence from racing, clocking 13 minutes and 23 seconds in the opening 5 km leg of the Chiba Ekiden Relay in Japan. This performance put his Australian team in first place, before they dropped to 7th. His time of 13:23 was just outside the event record.

In the 2010 season he won the Great Yorkshire Run in Sheffield, beating home favourite Chris Thompson to the line by just one second. He beat Chris Thompson again on 18 September 2010 by one second in a close finish at the Great North City Games 2-mile event in 8.31.

In August 2012 Craig Mottram competed in the London Olympics 5000m for Australia. He was the fastest Australian at those Olympics, with a 13.40, but was unable to make it into the final.

== Personal best times ==
- 1500 metres 3:33.97 (Zürich, Switzerland, 18 August 2006)
- Mile 3:48.98 (Oslo, Norway, 29 July 2005)
- 2000 metres 4:50.76 (Melbourne, Australia, 3 September 2006, Oceanic Record)
- 3000 metres 7:32.19 (Athens, Greece, 17 September 2006, Oceanic Record)
- 2 miles 8:03.50 (Eugene, United States, 6 October 2007, Oceanic Record)
- 5000 metres 12:55.76 (London, England, 30 July 2004, Oceanic Record)
- 10,000 metres 27:34.48 (Palo Alto, United States, 5 April 2008)
- 10 km (road) 27:54 (Manchester, England, 23 May 2004, Oceanic Record)
- Parkrun 14:00 (Bushy Parkrun, London, 2006, World Record)
