= Bushy Parkrun =

Weekly running event in Bushy Park, London, England

Coordinates: 51°24′42″N 0°19′56″W

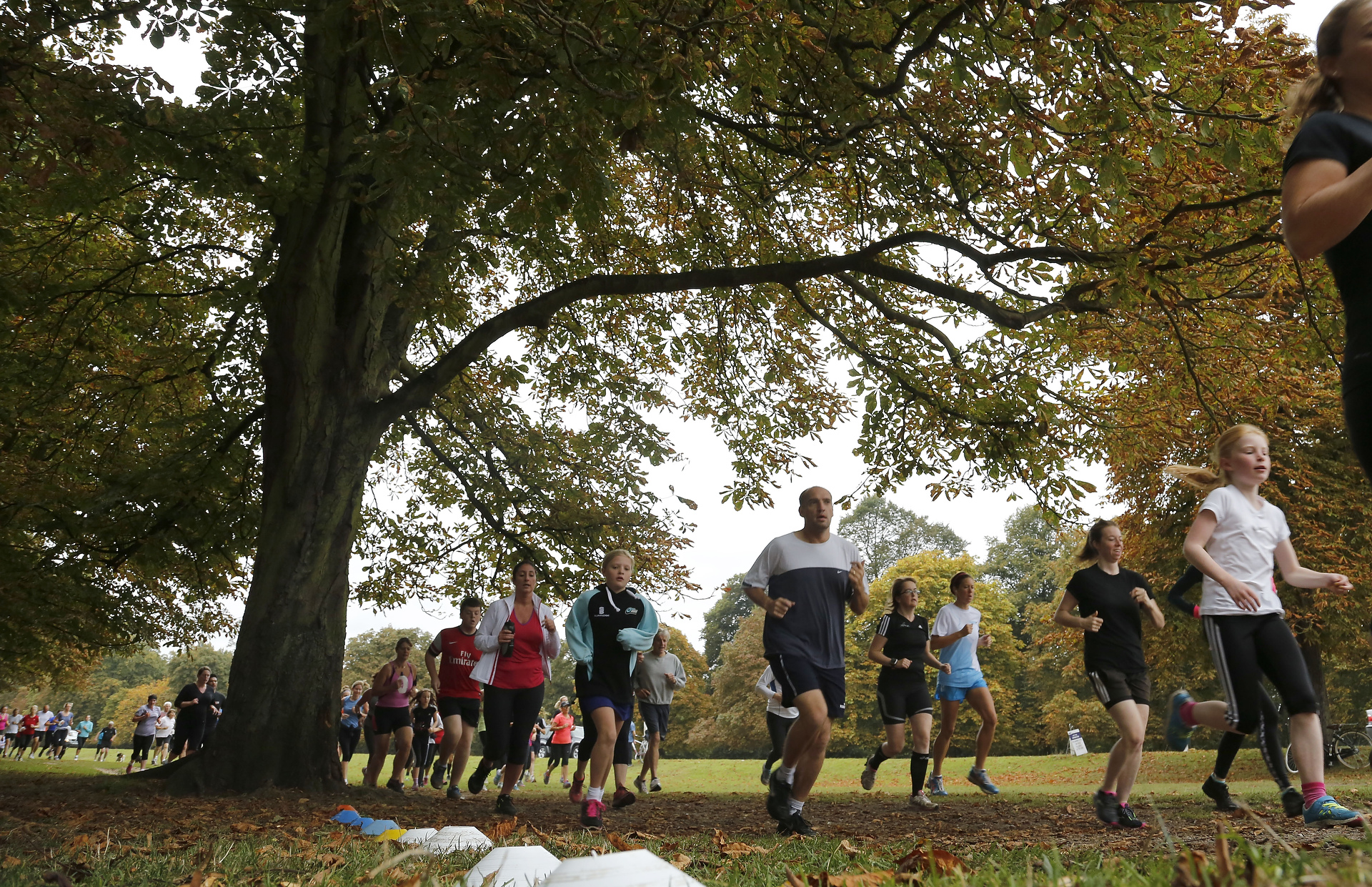
- Bushy Parkrun in 2014
- Date: Every Saturday, 9 am
- Location: Bushy Park, London
- Event type: Multi-terrain
- Distance: 5 kilometres (3.1 miles)
- Established: 2 October 2004; 22 years ago
- Course records: Andrew Baddeley 13:48 (2012); Justina Heslop 15:58 (2011)
- Website: www.parkrun.org.uk/bushy

Bushy Parkrun (stylised Bushy parkrun) is a running event that takes place every Saturday morning at 9 am in Bushy Park, Teddington, London. It was the very first Parkrun, founded by Paul Sinton-Hewitt in October 2004 under its original name Bushy Park Time Trial. The event has become a pilgrimage for Parkrunners, attracting entrants from across the globe. It is entirely managed by volunteers and is free to enter. The course is 5km in length with a terrain that is mostly footpaths and grass. The run holds the UK record number of entrants with 6,204 people on its 1000th event in 2024. There have been numerous notable participants including the former men's Parkrun record holder Andrew Baddeley, and double Olympic 5 km gold medallist Mo Farah.

== History ==
Bushy Parkrun was founded by Paul Sinton-Hewitt under its original name Bushy Park Time Trial. The event started on 2 October 2004 with just 13 runners taking part in the inaugural event. The organisers changed the name to UK Time Trial (UKTT) and in October 2008 to Parkrun. In 2007, the Parkrun events began to be staged elsewhere in London and the UK. It has also since expanded into 23 other countries.

Originally Parkrun results were recorded manually on laptops with runners receiving a metal token after finishing. Barcodes were introduced in October 2009, shortly after the 5th anniversary run which had a record turnout; this made recording results significantly quicker.

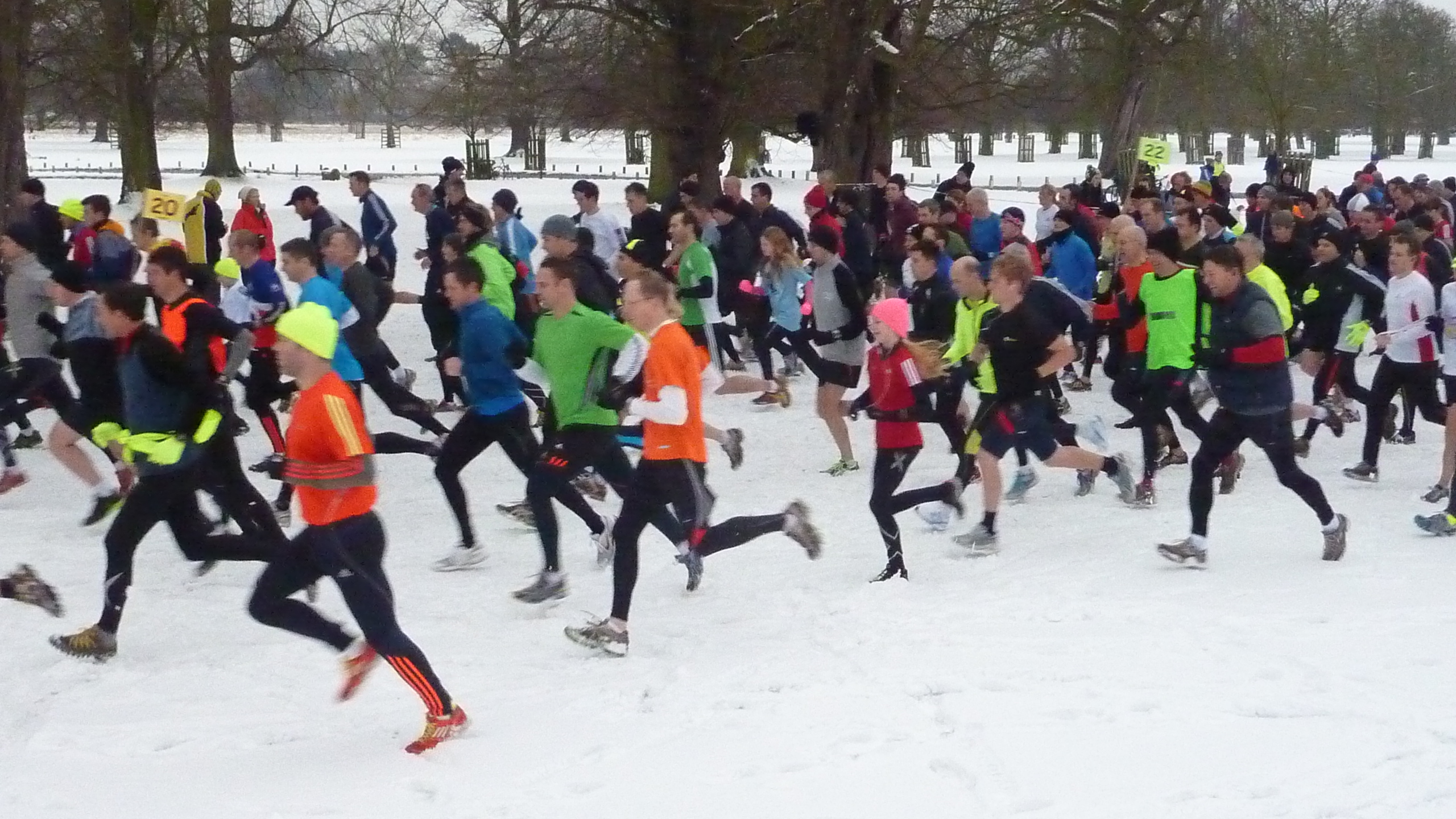
Runners in 2013

On 2 October 2014, Bushy Parkrun celebrated its 10th anniversary. The event celebrating this was run on 4 October 2014 and contained a record 1,705 runners, beating the previous record of 1,184 on 11 January 2014, which was the 500th event.

Bushy Parkrun is highly rated by the runners who have taken part in it, with a 96% overall rating and 98% reporting that they would take part again, in the Runner's World running event survey. The event is reported on a weekly basis by the local press, and the Parkrun phenomenon is gaining national exposure. As well as being the oldest Parkrun, Bushy is by far the largest event in the UK, consistently getting over 1,000 participants each week and over 50 volunteers.

Due to its large turnout, Bushy Parkrun has over 40 volunteer roles including some uncommon to other Parkrun events such as a Lead Bike and Visually Impaired Guides.

As with all other parkrun events, runners must pre-register on the parkrun website and bring their barcode with them to get a recorded time for the event. With this barcode, a runner can record a time at any parkrun they choose to run.

== Course ==
The course is fast, flat and runs anticlockwise from close to the Diana Fountain in Bushy Park. Due to its large size, Bushy Parkrun has had to adapt over the years to accommodate for its increasing popularity, differing itself from other Parkrun events. Such innovations include changing its route twice, once in 2006 and again in 2015, and adopting a two-funnel system at the finish line in 2012.

== Tourism ==
Bushy Park is the origin of the now international phenomenon. The event has become a place of pilgrimage for runners across the globe, having many tourists every week.

== Records ==
The record number of runners completing the course is 6,204 people for the 1000th event, on 31 August 2024. The course record for men of 13 minutes 48 seconds was set on 11 August 2012 and is held by Andrew Baddeley; the previous record was exactly 14 minutes held by Craig Mottram. The women's record of 15:58 was set on 22 October 2011 by Justina Heslop. The previous record holder was Gladys Chemweno (16:11 on 8 May 2010) who beat Katrina Wootton's women's record of 16 minutes 20 seconds (1 January 2009). This performance beat parkrun's longest standing record: Olympic Games silver medallist Sonia O'Sullivan had previously held the record since 18 June 2005.

== Notable participants ==
- Andrew Baddeley, British Olympic 2008 1500m runner
- Martin Cross, British Olympic rowing gold medallist
- Richard Dunwoody, jockey who has won the Grand National and the Cheltenham Gold Cup
- Becky Essex, England women's national rugby union team player
- Mo Farah, Olympic 5000m gold medallist, Olympic 10000m gold medallist
- Craig Mottram, Australian 5000m runner
- Sonia O'Sullivan, Irish Olympic silver medallist
- Jonny Searle, British Olympic rowing gold medallist
- Richard Stannard, British triathlete and 2011 ITU World Aquathlon Champion
- Jodie Swallow, British triathlete
- Jake Wightman, British 1500m runner
