= Sean Santana =

South African boxer

Team South Africa

Sean Santana (born 26 December 1976) is a South African boxer. He was educated at Potchefstroom Boys High and graduated in 1994, he was in the same high school class as Zimbabwean cyclist Warren Carne and the South African 800m Atlanta Olympic Silver medalist Hezekiél Sepeng.

Santana holds a black belt in karate and represented South Africa in boxing at the 2006 Melbourne Commonwealth Games. He lost in the first round to eventual silver medalist India's Harpreet Singh. Santana has since become a professional boxer fighting as a cruiser weight.
