= Georgia Gould (cyclist) =

American cyclist (born 1980)

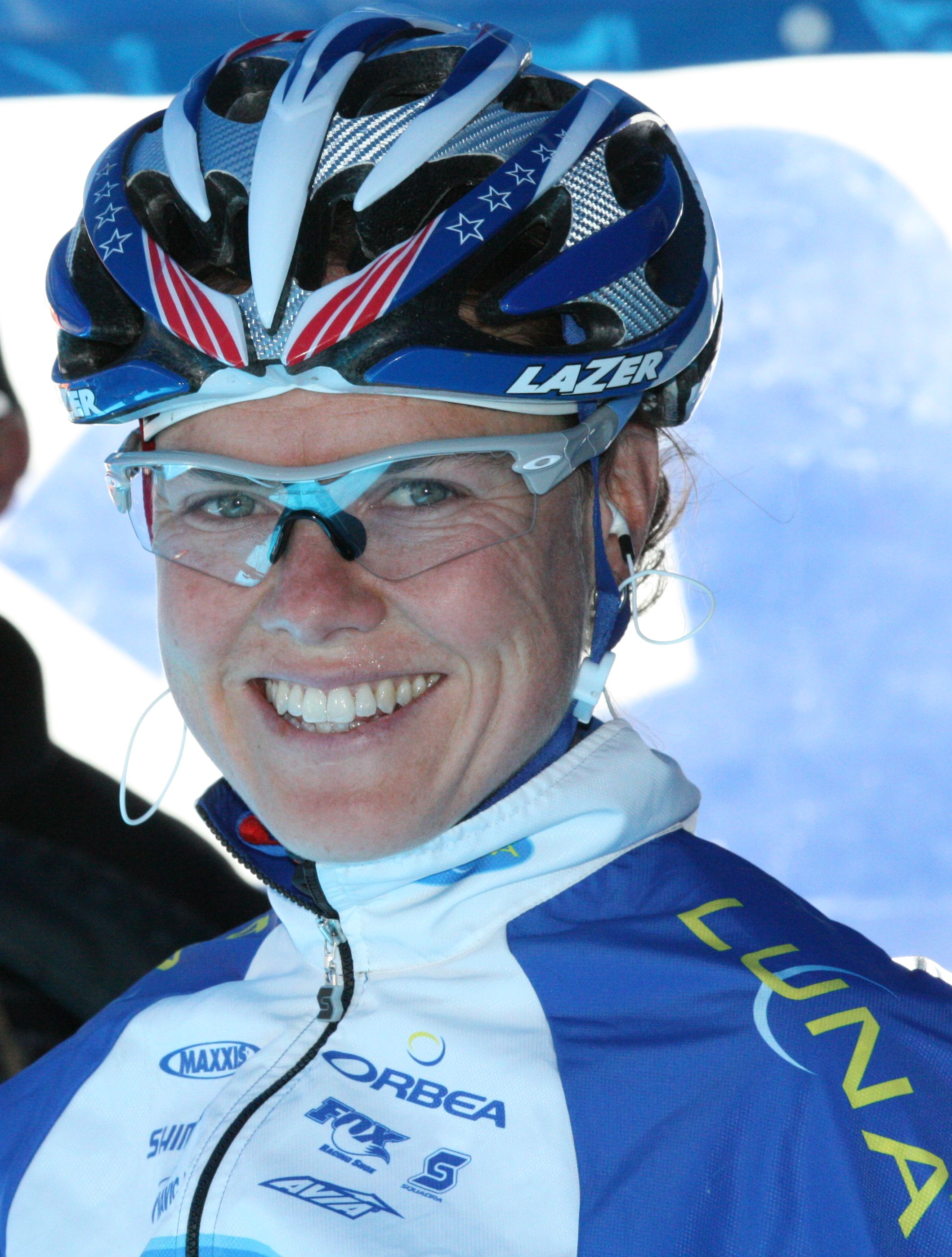
- Georgia Gould at the XCO World Cup in Nove Mesto na Morave (CZE) on May 13, 2012

Personal information
- Born: January 5, 1980 (age 46) Baltimore, Maryland, U.S.
- Height: 5 ft 9 in (1.75 m)
- Weight: 139 lb (63 kg)

Cycling career
- Sport: Cycling
- Current team: Unaffiliated
- Disciplines: Mountain bike, Cyclocross
- Role: Rider

Professional teams
- 2004–2005: Team Tamarack (MTB)
- Kona (Cyclocross)
- 2006-2016: LUNA Pro Team

Major wins
- 1. Bronze medal 2012 Olympic Games, Cross Country Mountain Bike; 2. USA Cross Country Mountain Bike National Champion (2012, 2011, 2010, 2006); 3. US Pro Cross Country Tour Overall Champion (2010); 4. USA Short Track Mountain Bike National Champion (2009); 5. USGP of Cyclocross Series Champion (2010, 2008, 2007); 6. USA National Mountain Bike Series Champion, Cross Country (2008); 7. North American Cyclocross Trophy Series Champion (2008); 8. GP Hotel Threeland (2008); 9. USA National Mountain Bike Series Champion (2007); 10. Pan American MTB Champion, Cross Country (2007)
Medal record
Women's cycling
Representing United States
Olympic Games
Bronze medal – third place	2012 London	Cross-country

Georgia Gould (born January 5, 1980) is an American professional mountain bike and cyclocross competitor, and Olympian (2008, 2012). She has earned five career national championships – four in cross-country mountain bike in 2006, 2010, 2011 and 2012, and one in short track mountain bike in 2009. In 2012, Gould won the bronze medal at the London Olympic Games in cross country mountain bike. From 2006 to 2016 Gould was employed by the LUNA Pro Team. In 2012, Gould was named North American MTB Woman of the Year by VeloNews magazine. She is a direct descendant of railroad baron Jay Gould and currently resides in East Burke, Vermont with her husband, Dusty LaBarr.

== Accomplishments ==
=== Mountain Bike ===
From 2006 to 2016 Georgia Gould finished on the podium of the USA Mountain Bike National Championships in either cross-country, short track, or both. She earned national titles in cross-country in 2006, 2010, 2011 and 2012, and short track in 2009. In 2007, Gould became only the second woman in history to sweep all six of the USA National Mountain Bike Series races (formerly NORBA). The last to do so was American Juli Furtado in 1993. Gould reprised her NMBS series win in cross-country in 2008, and again by winning the 2010 US Pro Cross-Country Tour.

Internationally Gould has been similarly successful: In 2012, she won the bronze medal for cross-country mountain bike at the 2012 Olympic Games in London. In 2008, she finished 5th overall in the UCI Mountain Bike World Cup, and followed it with a 4th place overall in 2010. In 2007, she won the gold medal at the 2007 Pan American Mountain Bike Championships in Neuquén, Argentina, propelling the US Women's mountain biking program to the top of international rankings. In 2009, Gould finished 2nd in the American Continental Mountain Bike Championships in Santiago, Chile.

=== Cyclocross ===
Georgia Gould has excelled in cyclocross both domestically and internationally, finishing no worse than third in the USA Cyclocross National Championships since 2006 (save for 2009 and 2011 when she did not compete in the event). She has won the U.S. Gran Prix of Cyclocross series three times (2007, 2008, and 2010) and the North American Cyclocross Trophy once in 2008. Internationally Gould won the 2008 GP Hotel Threeland in Pétange, Luxembourg and placed 3rd in the 2008 Grand Prix Nommay, part of the UCI Cyclocross World Cup.

=== Equal Pay for Women Cyclists ===
In December 2007 Gould became known for the "Gould Formula" – a proposal to award equal prize money to the top five men and women finishers in international cyclocross events. A petition delivered to the UCI (cycling's governing body) stated: "We, the undersigned, find it regrettable that there is a considerable disparity between the UCI minimum prize money for men and women. We understand that because competition in the men's field is deeper, more places receive prize money. We do not understand why the women who are receiving prize money receive less than their male counterparts. Therefore we propose that the UCI show leadership and mandate equal prize money for the top five men and women. Article 3 of the UCI Constitution states: «The UCI will carry out its activities in compliance with the principles of: a) equality between all the members and all the athletes, license-holders and officials, without racial, political, religious or other discrimination.» We ask the UCI to honor its commitment to equality."

Gould was appointed as a member of the inaugural UCI Athletes' Commission in 2011. In 2013, Gould was appointed to the UCI Mountain Bike Commission where she helped secure equal prize money for women in all UCI-sanctioned Mountain Bike races.

== Achievements ==
Georgia Gould's career highlights

2012 Mountain Bike

(bronze) Bronze medal, Olympic Games, Cross-Country Mountain Bike
(United States) USA Mountain Bike National Champion, Cross Country

2011 Mountain Bike

(United States) USA Mountain Bike National Champion, Cross Country

- 2nd 2012 Olympic Test Event (GBR)
- 2nd Overall, US Pro Cross Country Tour (USA)
  - 1st US Pro XCT #1 – Bonelli Park, Cross Country
  - 1st US Pro XCT #3 – Sea Otter Classic, Cross Country
  - 1st US Pro XCT #4 – Mellow Johnny's Classic, Cross Country
  - 1st US Pro XCT #6 – Subaru Cup, Cross Country
  - 1st US Pro XCT #6 – Subaru Cup, Short Track
  - 2nd US Pro XCT #1 – Bonelli Park, Short Track
  - 2nd US Pro XCT #2 – Fontana, Cross Country
  - 3rd US Pro XCT #1 – Bonelli Park, Super D
- 1st Teva Mountain Games, Cross Country (USA)
- 3rd USA Mountain Bike National Championships, Short Track

2011 Cyclocross

- 2nd U.S. Gran Prix of Cyclocross #1 – Planet Bike Cup
- 2nd U.S. Gran Prix of Cyclocross #2 – Planet Bike Cup
- 2nd Boulder Cup
- 3rd Colorado Classic
- 3rd U.S. Gran Prix of Cyclocross #3 – New Belgium Cup

2010 Mountain Bike

(United States) USA Mountain Bike National Champion, Cross Country

- 2nd USA Mountain Bike National Championships, Short Track
- 1st Overall, US Pro Cross Country Tour
  - 1st US Pro XCT #3 – Mellow Johnny's Classic, Cross Country
  - 1st US Pro XCT #4 – Subaru Cup, Cross Country
  - 2nd US Pro XCT #4 – Subaru Cup, Short Track
  - 3rd US Pro XCT #1 – Fontana, Short Track
- 4th Overall, 2010 UCI Mountain Bike World Cup
  - 2nd UCI World Cup #3 – Offenburg (DEU)
  - 3rd UCI World Cup #6 – Windham (USA)
  - 4th UCI World Cup #1 – Dalby Forest (GBR)
- 1st Sea Otter Classic, Cross Country (USA)
- 1st Sea Otter Classic, Short Track (USA)
- 1st Teva Mountain Games, Cross Country (USA)

2010 Cyclocross

- 2nd USA Cycling Cyclocross National Championships
- 1st Overall, U.S. Gran Prix of Cyclocross (USA)
  - 1st USGP #3 – Derby City Cup
  - 1st USGP #4 – Derby City Cup
  - 2nd USGP #1 – Planet Bike Cup
  - 2nd USGP #2 – Planet Bike Cup
  - 2nd USGP #7 – Portland Cup
  - 2nd USGP #8 – Portland Cup
  - 3rd USGP #5 – Mercer Cup
  - 3rd USGP #6 – Mercer Cup
- 1st North American Cyclocross Trophy #6 – Boulder Cup (USA)
- 2nd North American Cyclocross Trophy #5 – Boulder Cup (USA)
- 4th Cross Vegas (USA)

2009 Mountain Bike

(United States) USA Mountain Bike National Champion, Short Track

- 1st US Cup Sea Otter Classic, Cross Country
- 1st US Cup Fontana, Cross Country
- 1st US Cup Fontana, Short Track
- 1st BC Bike Race, Mixed Team (CAN)
- 2nd American Continental MTB Championships, Cross Country (CHL)
- 2nd US Cup Pelham, Cross Country
- 2nd US Cup Windham, Cross Country
- 2nd Teva Mountain Games, Cross Country (USA)
- 3rd Teva Mountain Games, Short Track (USA)
- 4th USA Mountain Bike National Championships, Cross Country

2009 Cyclocross

- 1st Granogue Cross (USA)
- 1st Wissahickon Cross (USA)
- 2nd U.S. Gran Prix of Cyclocross #3 – Derby City Cup
- 2nd UGSP #5 – Mercer Cup
- 2nd North American Cyclocross Trophy #7 – Blue Sky Velo Cup
- 2nd North American Cyclocross Trophy #10 – Southampton
- 3rd UGSP #1 – Mad Cross
- 3rd UGSP #2 – Mad Cross
- 3rd North American Cyclocross Trophy #9 – Southampton
- 3rd Cross Vegas (USA)
- 4th UGSP #4 – Derby City Cup
- 4th UGSP #6 – Mercer Cup

2008 Mountain Bike

- 2nd USA Mountain Bike National Championships, Cross Country
- 1st Overall, USA National Mountain Bike Series, Cross Country
  - 1st NMBS Fontana, Cross Country
  - 1st NMBS Fontana, Short Track
  - 1st NMBS Fountain Hills, Cross Country
  - 1st NMBS Windham, Cross Country
  - 2nd NMBS Fountain Hills, Short Track
  - 2nd NMBS Windham, Short Track
  - 2nd NMBS Deer Valley, Cross Country
  - 2nd NMBS Brian Head, Cross Country
  - 3rd NMBS Deer Valley, Short Track
- 5th Overall, UCI Mountain Bike World Cup
  - 4th UCI World Cup #6, Mt. Sainte Anne (CAN)
  - 5th UCI World Cup #1 Houffalize (BEL)
  - 5th UCI World Cup #3 Madrid (ESP)
  - 5th UCI World Cup #7 Bromont (CAN)
- 8th Olympic Games (CHN)

2008 Cyclocross

- 2nd USA Cycling Cyclocross National Championships
- 1st Overall, North American Cyclocross Trophy (USA)
  - 1st NACT #5 – Boulder Cup
  - 1st NACT #6 – Boulder Cup
  - 1st NACT #7 – Southampton
  - 1st NACT #8 – Southampton
- 1st Overall, U.S. Gran Prix of Cyclocross (USA)
  - 1st USGP #2 – Derby City Cup
  - 1st USGP #3 – Mercer Cup
  - 1st USGP #4 – Mercer Cup
  - 2nd USGP #5 – Portland Cup
  - 2nd USGP #6 – Portland Cup
  - 3rd USGP #1 – Derby City Cup
- 1st GP Hotel Threeland (LUX)
- 2nd Cincinnati UCI3 – BioWheels (USA)
- 2nd Cincinnati UCI3 – Cyclo-Stampede (USA)
- 3rd UCI Cyclocross World Cup #5 – Grand Prix Nommay (FRA)
- 3rd Cross Vegas (USA)

2007 Mountain Bike

- 1st Pan American Mountain Bike Championships (ARG)
- 2nd USA Cycling Mountain Bike National Championships, Cross Country
- 3rd UCI Mountain Bike World Championships, Relay (GBR)
- 1st Overall, USA National Mountain Bike Series
  - 1st NMBS Phoenix, Time Trial
  - 1st NMBS Phoenix, Cross Country
  - 1st NMBS Phoenix, Short Track
  - 1st NMBS Santa Barbara, Cross Country
  - 1st NMBS Fontana, Cross Country
  - 1st NMBS Fontana, Short Track
  - 1st NMBS Deer Valley, Cross Country
  - 1st NMBS Sugar Mountain, Cross Country
  - 1st NMBS Snowmass, Cross Country
  - 2nd NMBS Santa Barbara, Short Track
  - 2nd NMBS Deer Valley, Short Track
  - 2nd NMBS Snowmass, Short Track
  - 3rd NMBS Sugar Mountain, Short Track
- 1st Czech Cup, Cross Country (CZE)
- 1st Sea Otter Classic, Cross Country (USA)
- 2nd Sea Otter Classic, Time Trail (USA)
- 4th Olympics Test Event, Cross Country (CHN)
- 5th UCI World Cup #5, St. Felicien (CAN)

2007 Cyclocross

- 3rd USA Cycling Cyclocross National Championships
- 1st Overall, U.S. Gran Prix of Cyclocross (USA)
  - 1st USGP #3 – Mercer Cup
  - 1st USGP #4 – Mercer Cup
  - 1st USGP #5 – Portland Cup
  - 1st USGP #6 – Portland Cup
  - 2nd USGP #1 – Derby City Cup
  - 2nd USGP #2 – Derby City Cup
- 1st Beacon Cross (USA)
- 1st Highland Park Cross (USA)
- 2nd Boulder Cup (USA)
- 2nd Redline Cup (USA)

2006 Mountain Bike

(United States) USA Mountain Bike National Champion, Cross Country

- 2nd USA National Mountain Bike Series – Deer Valley, Short Track
- 3rd NMBS Sugar Mountain, Short Track
- 3rd Sea Otter Classic, Supercross Omnium (USA)

2006 Cyclocross

- 2nd USA Cycling Cyclocross National Championships
- 1st U.S. Gran Prix of Cyclocross #2 – Gran Prix of Gloucester
- 2nd USGP #1 – Gran Prix of Gloucester
- 2nd USGP #3 – Boulder Cup
- 2nd Whitmore's Super Cross Cup #2 (USA)
- 2nd Charm City Cyclocross #1 (USA)
- 3rd USGP #4 – Boulder Cup
- 3rd USGP #6 – Stumptown Cup
- 3rd Charm City Cyclocross #2 (USA)
- 3rd Granogue Cross (USA)
- 3rd Wissahickon Cross (USA)

2005

- 1st Overall, Verge Mid-Atlantic Cyclocross Series (USA)
- 3rd U.S. Gran Prix of Cyclocross #5 – Surf City (USA)

Awards and achievements
Preceded by Georgia Gould	USA Cross-Country Mountain Bike National Champion; 2012	Succeeded by TBD
Preceded by Georgia Gould	USA Cross-Country Mountain Bike National Champion; 2011	Succeeded by Georgia Gould
Preceded by Heather Irmiger	USA Cross-Country Mountain Bike National Champion; 2010	Succeeded by Georgia Gould
Preceded by Katie Compton	USA Short Track Mountain Bike National Champion; 2009	Succeeded by Katie Compton
Preceded by Mary McConneloug	USA Cross-Country Mountain Bike National Champion; 2006	Succeeded by Mary McConneloug
