= Cec Dixon =

South African cricketer

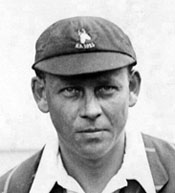
- Cec Dixon in 1924

Personal information
- Full name: Cecil Donovan Dixon
- Batting: Right-handed
- Bowling: Right-arm medium

International information
- National side: South Africa

Career statistics
Competition	Tests	First-class
Matches	1	33
Runs scored	0	184
Batting average	0.00	5.93
100s/50s	0/0	0/0
Top score	0	27
Balls bowled	240	5,200
Wickets	3	106
Bowling average	39.33	24.11
5 wickets in innings	0	6
10 wickets in match	0	1
Best bowling	2/62	7/16
Catches/stumpings	1/0	21/0
- Source: Cricinfo, 7 January 2019

Cecil Donovan Dixon (12 February 1891 in Potchefstroom, South African Republic – 9 September 1969 in Johannesburg) played first-class cricket between 1913 and 1924. He was educated at Potchefstroom High School for Boys.

Cec Dixon was a medium-to-fast-medium pace bowler and tail-end batsman. From 39 innings he amassed just 184 runs with a top score of 27 and ended his career with an average below six. But he was a respected bowler who took five wickets in an innings on six occasions and ten wickets in a match once.

His best figures, 7 for 16, were gained at the expense of Griqualand West in a Currie Cup match played at Johannesburg in 1923/24. In that season Dixon took 33 wickets at an average of exactly 10 runs apiece, topped the national bowling averages and helped Transvaal to their eighth domestic title.

Dixon toured England with South Africa during the summer of 1924 but was rather disappointing. His only success of note was against Scotland at Glasgow where he took 4 for 14 and 6 for 39 to gain his only five-wicket haul of the tour and the only ten-wicket match of his career. He did not play in any of the Tests on that tour. He had played his sole Test ten years earlier at Johannesburg. Playing against an England side led by J.W.H.T. Douglas in the third match of the series, Dixon failed to score in either innings and took three wickets for 118 runs in the match, including the great Jack Hobbs twice.

He played just one further first-class match after the 1924 tour. Since his death in 1969 no obituary for him has appeared in Wisden Cricketer's Almanack.
