= Potchefstroom High School for Boys =

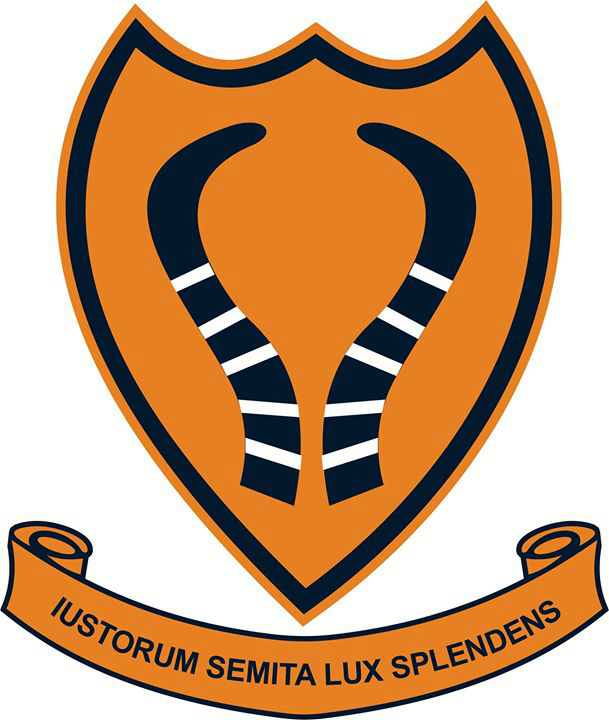
- Potchefstroom High School for Boys crest

Location
- 45 Beyers Naude Ave; Potchefstroom, North West 2531; South Africa

Information
- Type: All-boys public school
- Motto: Iustorum Semita Lux Splendens (The path of the just is a shining light)
- Religious affiliation: Christianity
- Established: 1905; 121 years ago
- Founder: The Rt Hon Lord Milner
- Sister school: Potchefstroom High School for Girls
- Headmaster: L. Van der Merwe
- Staff: 36 (excluding faculty)
- Grades: 8–12
- Gender: Male
- Age: 14 to 18
- Enrollment: 500 boys
- Language: English
- Schedule: 07:30 - 14:00
- Houses: Barnard; Buxton; Granton; Milton
- Colours: Blue white orange
- Alumni: Old Boys, Old Mooi
- Sports: Rugby, cricket, hockey
- Publications: The Mooi
- Website: www.potchboyshigh.co.za

Potchefstroom High School for Boys is a public English medium high school for boys situated in Potchefstroom in the North West province of South Africa. It is one of the oldest schools in South Africa.

== Historical perspective ==
=== School history ===
With the Transvaal under British control, Lord Milner, the Colonial Secretary at the time created educational facilities (known as the Milner Schools) for English-speaking pupils. The site for the school had been an infamous concentration camp during the Second South African War. The first school on the land was for the children interned in the camp. On 31 January 1905, accompanied by the band of the Border Regiment, Sir Richard Solomon, Lt-Governor of Transvaal opened Potchefstroom College upon instruction from the then Education Department, the school was renamed Potchefstroom High School for Boys. "College" is a boarding school based on the English boarding schools system. Founded by C.D. Hope (who was also the first principal of Pretoria Boys High School as well as Jeppe High School for Boys), the original structure had been built long before and had to close during the Anglo-Boer war. The school-building itself was designed in Cape Dutch architecture design as was prominent in style during those times which has since been declared a local heritage site. There are 3 boarding houses: Granton (Oxford Blue) (1909), Milton (Cambridge Blue) (1910) and Buxton (British Racing Green), which was constructed much later. The fourth house, Barnard (Royal Red) is the 'Day-Boy' house. These later buildings did not follow the traditional Cape Dutch styles and were built more suited to the period they were built in. The school's motto, Iustorum Semita Lux Splendens (Latin), was adapted by the founder C.D. Hope, from Proverbs 4:18, and means "The path of righteousness (alternately: the just) is (as) a shining light."

During the 1905 hunting season, just before the first Springbok team went on their rugby tour, the headmaster C.D. Hope was given the horns of a springbok by his brother-in-law. These horns, mounted, are in the school’s museum and a springbok head forms part of the school’s badge.

=== Past headmasters ===
- 1905–1926: C. D. Hope
- 1927–1940: F. G. Tyers
- 1941–1955: A. D. MacDonald
- 1956–1975: W. J. B MacFarlane
- 1976–1988: H. D. Ackermann
- 1988–1994: T. J. Blake
- 1994–2009: M. C. Cartwright
- 2009–2019: J. Van Vuuren
- 2022– present: L. Van Der Merwe

== Schooling ==
=== Sports ===
The school has a reputation for being very sports-orientated as every student is required to participate in at least one sport during each sport's season. Since the school's inception "Boys High" has produced many internationally recognized sportsmen. A wide variety of sports are offered at the school of which the more popular ones include: rugby, hockey, cricket, tennis, and swimming. Beyond this, each student is then required to do athletics at inter-house level.

Apart from the local schools Potchefstroom Boys' traditional sporting rivals include Pretoria Boys’ High, King Edwards, Jeppe Boys, Parktown Boys and St Stithians each year.

=== Cultural ===
The school's cultural activities are run with the school's teaching staff in collaboration with the students; activities such as plays and public speaking occur regularly.

== Alumni ==
=== Old Boys Society ===
The school's alumni is formed of old school members who join the school's Old Boys Society. This is often referred to as Old Mooi because of the schools close proximity to the Mooi River which bisects the town of Potchefstroom. Among other tasks, the society is responsible for overseeing the school and helps with the Student Governing Body. The society is also responsible for meetings and student reunions.

=== Notable alumni ===
- Paul Sinton-Hewitt CBE, Parkrun founder
- Keagan Dolly, South African international footballer
- Matt Proudfoot, Scottish Rugby International and former Springbok & England forwards coach
- Jeremy Nel, Springbok Rugby Player
- Hezekiél Sepeng, Olympic athlete, Atlanta 1996 Silver medalist
- Bradley Nkoana Olympic athlete, Paris 2024 Silver medalist
- Sean Santana, South African Commonwealth boxer
- Warren Carne, Zimbabwean cyclist
- Sifiso Nhlapo, Beijing Olympic BMX cyclist
- William Diering, Beijing Olympic swimmer
- Edward Baker-Duly, West End & Downton Abbey actor
- Bhongolwethu Jayiya, South African Footballer
- Douglas Gibson (politician), Democratic Alliance former chief whip and South African Ambassador to Thailand
- Vivian Neser, South African cricket captain, rugby referee and judge
- Cec Dixon, South African Test cricketer
- Gary Outram, Vusumuzi Mazibuko, Johannes Diseko, Keith Storey, first class cricketers
- Eddie Leie, South African T20I cricketer
- Gavin Ewing, Zimbabwe cricketer
- Edgar Marutlulle, Bulls rugby player and current coach
- Nathan Kirsh, philanthropist and Forbes billionaire
- Robby De Sa, musician
- Edward McGill Alexander, former South African Army officer
- Katlego Moswane Maboe, South African TV presenter, singer-songwriter and accountant
