= Gary Outram =

South African cricketer (born 1976)

Gary Outram (born 13 February 1976) is a South African cricketer. He is a right-handed batsman who played for North West. He was born in Johannesburg and educated at Potchefstroom Boys High.

Outram played in the Standard Bank League for the first time in 1996–97, and continued to play for the team until 2000–01. Throughout his time at the club, North West remained one of the weakest teams in the league, securing only one win in the 1999–2000, in which Outram played six games. Outram's List A top score was an innings of 83 runs against Border, his only List A half-century.

Outram made a single first-class appearance for North West, during the 2000–01 season. With the match curtailed to just two days of play, Outram scored 14 in the only innings in which he batted.

He captained North West against a Zimbabwe XI in the UCB bowl tournament also turning out for the North West Dragons against the visiting English tourists under Nasser Hussain a few seasons back.
