= Paul Sinton-Hewitt =

Founder of Parkrun

Paul Sinton-Hewitt CBE
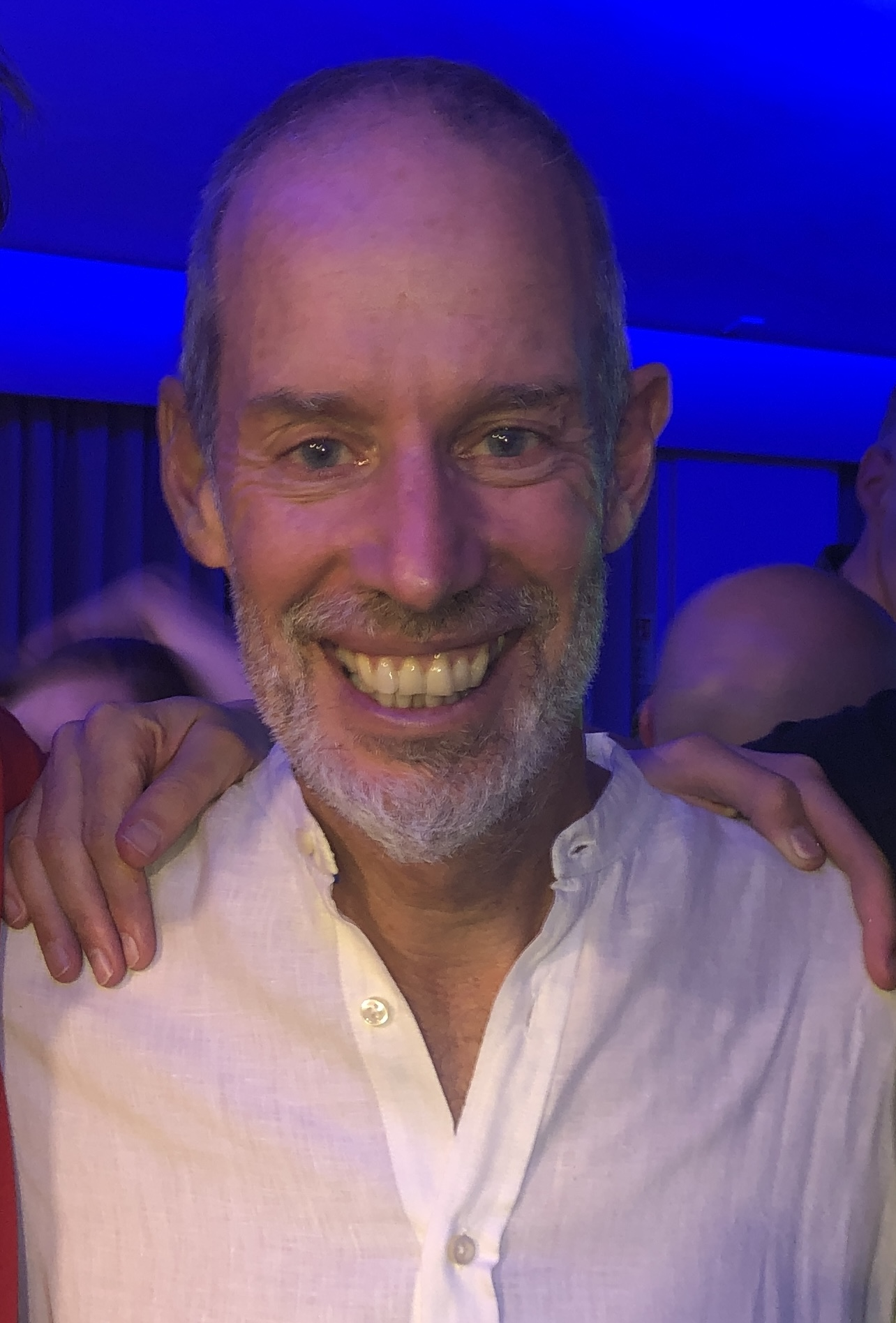
- Sinton-Hewitt in 2019
- Born: Peter Paul Sinton-Hewitt; 12 August 1960 (age 66); Southern Rhodesia
- Education: Potchefstroom High School for Boys
- Known for: Founder of Parkrun
- Awards: Albert Medal (2019); Ashoka Fellowship (2016)

Peter Paul Sinton-Hewitt CBE (born 12 August 1960) is the founder of Parkrun, a free running event that takes place every Saturday morning.

== Early life and education ==
Sinton-Hewitt was born in Southern Rhodesia, as his mother, a South African resident, had briefly left the country at the time of his birth. He grew up in South Africa to a Scottish father, James, and a South African mother, Mary. During WW2 his father was conscripted to the British military and posted to South Africa as an aerial photographer where he met Sinton-Hewitt's mother. At age five, due to his parents' marital struggles, Paul, his older brother and his sister, were made wards of the state and then lived at boarding schools.

He was educated at Potchefstroom High School and on leaving school did his mandatory two years' military service in the Air Force division of the South African Defence Force and then, due to his experience working with the radar systems, began working in the emerging field of IT. As he writes in his book, One Small Step, his youth in an institutionalised, rules-based environment made him well suited to working in systems. During his working life in Johannesburg he became a keen runner and applied his IT systems mindset to achieving his running goals, including a personal best of 2:35 in the marathon; he was also a crew member supporting Bruce Fordyce in the Comrades Marathon.

Sinton-Hewitt moved to the United Kingdom where he was living when he had a breakdown in 1995. He has said that the personal challenges he has experienced, including bullying during childhood, and the way exercise and activity have helped him deal with them, were influential in motivating him in creating Parkrun and its inclusive approach to sport.

== Running and Parkrun ==
Sinton-Hewitt started the Bushy Park Time Trial in 2004, combining his passion for running with his IT background. At that time he was unemployed and unable to run due to an injured leg and saw this initiative as a means to cope with the challenges he was facing. It evolved into Parkrun – a free five-kilometre timed running event that takes place every Saturday morning. The first event took place on 2 October 2004, with 13 entrants. In April 2010 a two-kilometre "Junior Parkrun" format was added at Bushy Park for children aged 4 to 14 (held monthly on Sunday mornings). The movement has grown into a global social phenomenon, expanding to more than 2,500 event locations across over 20 countries. Globally, over 10 million participants have registered for parkrun, with over 350,000 to 450,000 runners, walkers, and volunteers taking part every weekend as of November 2026.

In 2018, Sinton-Hewitt completed the Vitruvian Triathlon.

== Publications ==
In April 2025, Sinton-Hewitt published his first book, One Small Step: the definitive account of a run that became a global movement, which became a Sunday Times best seller. In it he documented his challenging upbringing and the genesis of what would become Parkrun.

== Awards and honours ==
Sinton-Hewitt was appointed a Commander of the Order of the British Empire (CBE) "for services to Grassroots Sport Participation" in the 2014 Birthday Honours, and was selected as an Ashoka Fellow in 2016. In December 2019, he was awarded the Albert Medal by the Royal Society of Arts for building a global participation movement. Loughborough University awarded him an honorary doctorate in sports in December 2025.

== In popular media ==
On 1 November 2026, Sinton-Hewitt was Lauren Laverne's castaway on BBC Radio 4's Desert Island Discs.
