= Zimbabwe Cycling Federation =

Governing body of cycling in Zimbabwe

Cycling Zimbabwe
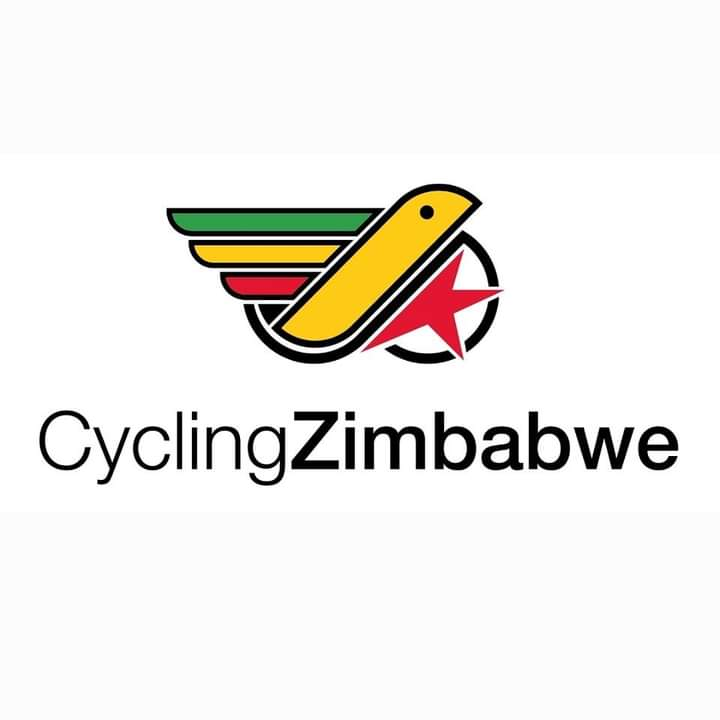
- Sport: Cycling
- Abbreviation: CZ
- Affiliation: UCI
- Regional affiliation: African Cycling Federation
- Headquarters: Harare
- Location: Block C,1st Floor, Smatsatsa Office Park, Harare, Zimbabwe
- President: Davis Muhambi
- Secretary: Elsie Maumbe

Official website
- www.cyclingzimbabwe.org
- (Zimbabwe)

Zimbabwe Cycling Federation reformed as Cycling Zimbabwe (CZ) is the national governing body of cycle racing in Zimbabwe. Cycling Zimbabwe is a member of the Confédération Africaine de Cyclisme and is also affiliated to the Zimbabwe Olympic Committee.

== History ==
Due to its warm climate, cycling in Zimbabwe has always been a popular past time, supported by a thriving Road, BMX and MTB club circuit, Zimbabwe Cycling has over the years punched well above its weight in terms of its achievements internationally. Zimbabwe first gained prominence on the world stage when shortly after independence from colonial Britain sent a road and track team to the 1980 Summer Olympics held in Moscow. The team consisted of Michael McBeath, John Musa and David Gillow – (the latter's daughter Shara Gillow now riding for FDJ Nouvelle-Aquitaine Futuroscope). Throughout the 1980s Graham Cockerton competed as a professional in South Africa riding in the well known Rapport Tour. In 1988 Zimbabwe again sent a squad consisting of Pierre Gouws and Gary Mandy to the 1988 Summer Olympics in South Korea.

In 1991, Gary Mandy turned from rider to team manager/coach and took Steve Draver, Kurt Begemann, Andrew Allen and Justin Marabini to the 5th, All Africa Games, in Cairo Egypt. The team won the bronze medal for the 100 km Team Time Trial, in 2 hrs and 12 minutes, using standard road bikes with clip on aero bars and disc wheels. This same year, the federation funded a Junior Team to the World Junior Cycling Championships in Colorado, USA. This team comprised Alan Harrison, Nathan Jones, Jason Whitehead and Gary Ohara.

After their success in Egypt, Zimbabwe fielded many National Teams to races such as The Tour Of Mauritius and South Africa's Giro del Capo. These teams gave birth to Zimbabwe's first European Pro Timothy Jones (cyclist) who competed for Zimbabwe at the 1996 Summer Olympics in Atlanta USA. Tim Jones won the Giro del Capo in 1998. Zimbabwe produced another climbing specialist at this time, Chris Hoffman, who was National Road Race and Time Trial champion from 1997 to 1999, and drafted by the Ster-Kinekor cycling team in South Africa. Hoffman then went on to race professionally with Tim Jones developing him in Europe, and represented Zimbabwe at the 2000 World Championships.

In 2005 former World Champion Belgian Roger De Vlaeminck sent a scouting team to the country with a view to creating Zimbabwe's first ever Cyclocross team, a team was selected which raced in the Under 23 World Cyclocross championships held in St Wendel Germany with this being covered by VTM (TV channel) in their popular cycling reality television show Allez Allez.

2006 saw Linda Davidson win bronze in the time trial at the African Road Championships held in Port Louis, Mauritius

2007 saw Zimbabwe further make history when they sent a 9 member squad to the very first African Mountain Bike Championships that were held in Windhoek Namibia . Zimbabwe fared well with Margie Gibson attaining Gold in the Veteran Ladies Cross Country and Trevor Volker Bronze in the SV Cross Country races. Antipas Kwari by finishing 8th in the Elite & U23 Race ensured qualification for the 2008 Olympic Games– a race in which he finished 48th in the men's cross country.

In 2015, David Martin, then-president of the Zimbabwe Cycling Federation, and five other cyclists attempted to set a new world record for the fastest human-powered crossing of the African content. Earlier that year, national cycling champion Bright Chipongo spoke out against Cycling Zimbabwe leadership for excluding black cyclists from competing at the African Continental Cycling Championships.

More recently Zimbabwe has been represented internationally by Skye Davidson who raced at the 2019 UCI Elite World Championships which were held in Yorkshire, England.

In 2022 Cycling Zimbabwe undertook a rebranding exercise with a new look and feel being applied to its organisation's logo with the new branding being in use at the 2023 National Road Cycling Championships that were held in Bulawayo.

Previous Elite National Road Champions (Men).

- 1990 - Steve Draver
- 1991 - Kurt Begemann
- 1992 - Mark Marabini
