= 2007 Pan American Mountain Bike Championships =

The 2007 Pan American Mountain Bike Continental Championships were held from March 8 to March 11, 2007, in Neuquén, Argentina.

== Elite Men ==
Rank	Name	Country	Time
1	Geoff Kabush	Canada	2:02:40
2	Seamus McGrath	Canada	2:03:30
3	Todd Wells	United States	2:03:32
4	Adam Craig	United States	2:04:09
5	Jeremy Horgan-Kobelski	United States	2:05:46
6	PSCHEIDT, RICARDO	BRA	2:06:13
7	CARACIOLI, LUCIANO	ARG	2:06:25
8	DA SILVA, MARCELO	BRA	2:07:24
9	BOTERO JHON, JAIRO	COL	2:07:54
10	Michael Broderick	USA	2:08:11
11	MONTOLLA CASTILLO, PAOLO	CRC	2:08:19
12	BISHOP, JEREMIH	USA	2:08:20
13	SOUSA CRUZ, EDIVANDO	BRA	2:09:05
14	VALERIANO RUBENS, DONISETE	BRA	2:09:40
15	TORRES ACOSTA, IGNACIO	MEX	2:09:52
16	RAMIREZ, MENDEZ	CRC	2:12:15
17	CARVALLO RAMIREZ, JONATHAN	CRC	2:12:17
18	GILLI, IGNACIO	ARG	2:13:29
19	LOSOWSKY, JAN	ARG	2:14:02
20	PEREYRA, JUAN P.	ARG	2:14:26
21	SILVA, CRISTOBAL	CHI	2:14:29
22	PUSCHEL, JAVIER	CHI	2:14:39
23	DE AZEVEDO ABRAU, ASSISE	BRA	2:14:57
24	ARAVENA, GONZALO	CHI	2:15:54
25	CAMARGO TASIO, BENBENITU	BRA	2:17:08
26	CARVALLO AROREIRA, TIAGO	BRA	2:18:20
27	CASTAEDA, FAVIO	COL	2:19:01
28	MACIAS, JAVIER	ARG	2:23:45
29	PLAUS, CLAUS	CHI	2:24:39
30	TELECHEA, MAURO	ARG	2:25:58
31	PADILLA, SANTIAGO	ECU	-2 laps
32	LEYTON, JORGE	ARG	-3 laps
33	LETTOLI, CESAR	ARG	-3 laps
34	POLLI, SANTIAGO	ARG	-3 laps
35	MORALEZ, IGNACIO	URU	-3 laps
36	RODRIGUEZ, MARTIN	URU	-3 laps
37	GOMEZ, FRANCO	URU	-4 laps
38	CORREA PEZZATTI, JORGE	URU	-4 laps
39	CUELLO, ALEXIS	URU	DNS
40	SANTANA, RODRIGO	ARG	DNS

== Elite Women ==
Rank	Name	Country	Time
1	Georgia Gould	USA	1:56:46
2	Mary McConneloug	USA	1:58:52
3	Willow Koerber	USA	2:01:37
4	IRMIGER, HEATHER	USA	2:02:12
5	CAMPOS, FRANCISCA	CHI	2:02:32
6	MORFIN, LAURA	MEX	2:03:40
7	MOURAO, JAQUELINE	BRA	2:11:14
8	DELGADILLO, FLOR	COL	2:14:48
9	GRAMISCELI, ERIKA	BRA	2:18:08
10	STOPA, ROBERTA	BRA	2:21:27
11	GARCIA, ELIZA	CHI	2:28:39
12	BUNZLI, DANIELA	CHI	2:30:19
13	UZCATEGUI, JEORGIA	VEN	2:30:53
14	CASTILLO, MARIA A.	VEN	2:31:05
15	RODRIGUEZ, NOELIA	ARG	2:31:28
16	ABURTO, SONIA	ARG	-1 laps
17	SIDES, VALERIA	ARG	-2 laps
18	MACHADO, RIDRIGUEZ JULIANA	BRA	-2 laps
19	DIOGENES, ALZIANE	BRA	-2 laps
20	LUQUE, LEILA	ARG	DNS
21	SALGADO GONZALEZ, CARLA	MEX	DNS
22	VANLANDINGHAN, SHONNY	USA	DNS
