= Parkrun =

Global 5k running events on Saturdays

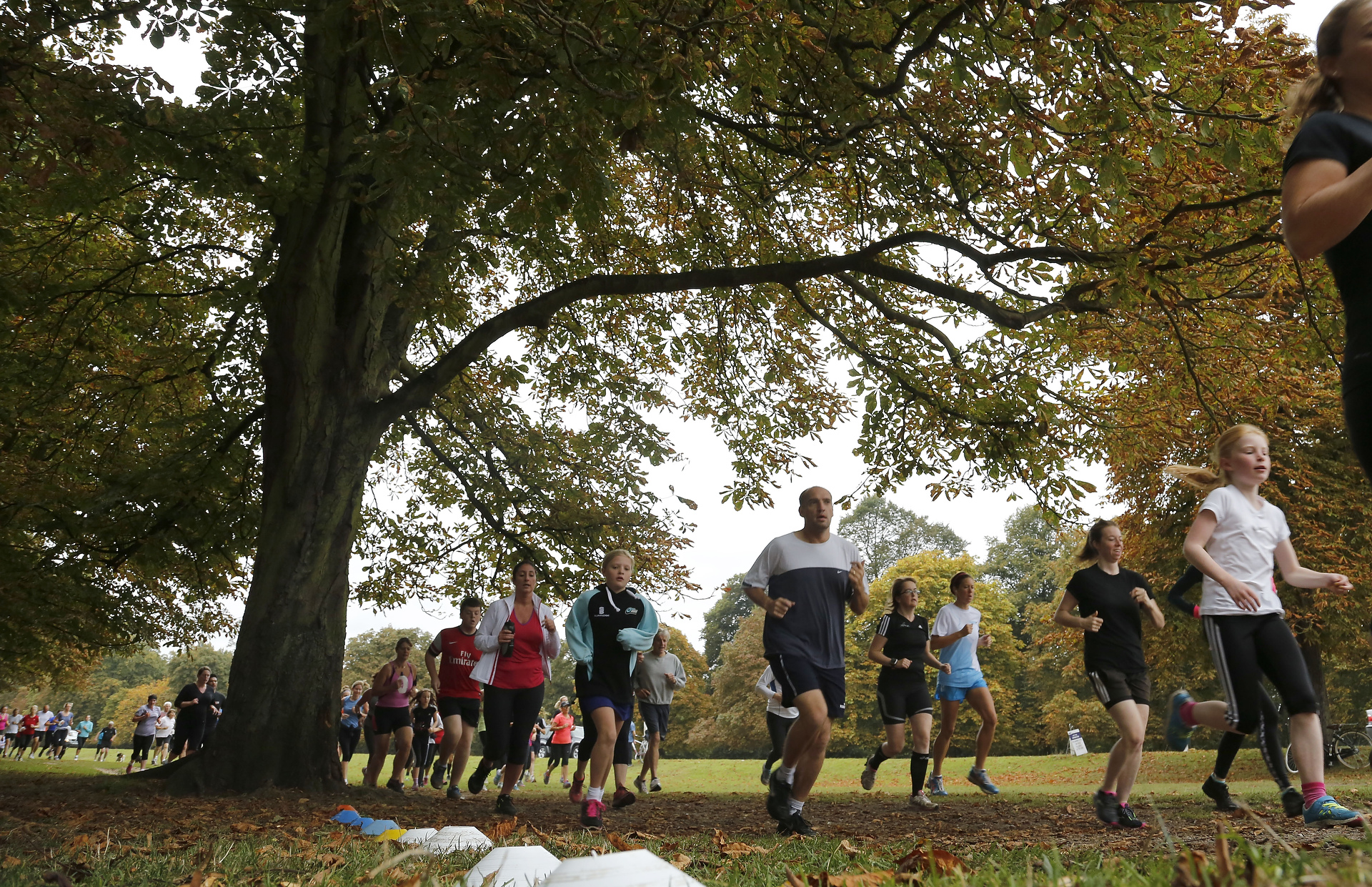
- Runners at Bushy Parkrun, where the first event took place
- Predecessor: Bushy Park Time Trial, UK Time Trial
- Formation: 2 October 2004; 22 years ago
- Founder: Paul Sinton-Hewitt
- Headquarters: Richmond, London, England
- Services: Global provision of weekly, timed 5km running events
- Members: Total individual runners (Oct 2019): 6,301,016
- Key people: Elizabeth Duggan (CEO)
- Volunteers: Total individual volunteers (Sept 2019): 515,283
- Website: www.parkrun.com

Parkrun (styled parkrun) is a collection of 5-kilometre (3.1 mi) events for runners, walkers and volunteers that take place every Saturday morning at more than 2,000 locations in 23 countries across five continents.

Parkrun was founded by Paul Sinton-Hewitt on 2 October 2004 at Bushy Park, in London, England; it was originally called the Bushy Park Time Trial. It grew into a network of similar events called the UK Time Trials, before adopting the name Parkrun in 2008 and expanding into other countries. The first event outside the United Kingdom was launched in Zimbabwe in 2008 followed by Denmark in 2009, with Australia, Poland, and South Africa in 2011. The most recent country to start an event is Lithuania in 2024.

Sinton-Hewitt was appointed a CBE for his services to grass-roots sport in 2014. By October 2018, over five million runners were registered worldwide; the total is now over ten million. The millionth Parkrun event took place on the weekend of 13/14 June 2026.

Events take place at a range of general locations including parks, stately homes, forests, rivers, lakes, reservoirs, beaches, promenades, prisons and nature reserves. A parkrun milestone T-shirt is offered for purchase to volunteers and runners who have participated in a specific number of runs or events. Runners can travel to and complete any Parkrun other than those on closed sites, such as prisons and military bases.

== History ==
Parkrun was founded by Paul Sinton-Hewitt on 2 October 2004 at Bushy Park, in London, England. Sinton-Hewitt was born in Southern Rhodesia and went to Potchefstroom High School for Boys in South Africa as a boarder. He became a club runner with a personal best marathon time of 2 hours and 36 minutes.

In 2004, Sinton-Hewitt was suffering from depression and was unable to run due to an injury. He founded Parkrun because he wanted to continue to spend time with his running friends. In a BBC Radio 4 interview, he said that the idea for Parkrun came from his time in South Africa 20 years earlier, where he had experienced competitive races that took place on the same course at the same time each week. The first event had 13 runners, three volunteers and was managed by Sinton-Hewitt himself.

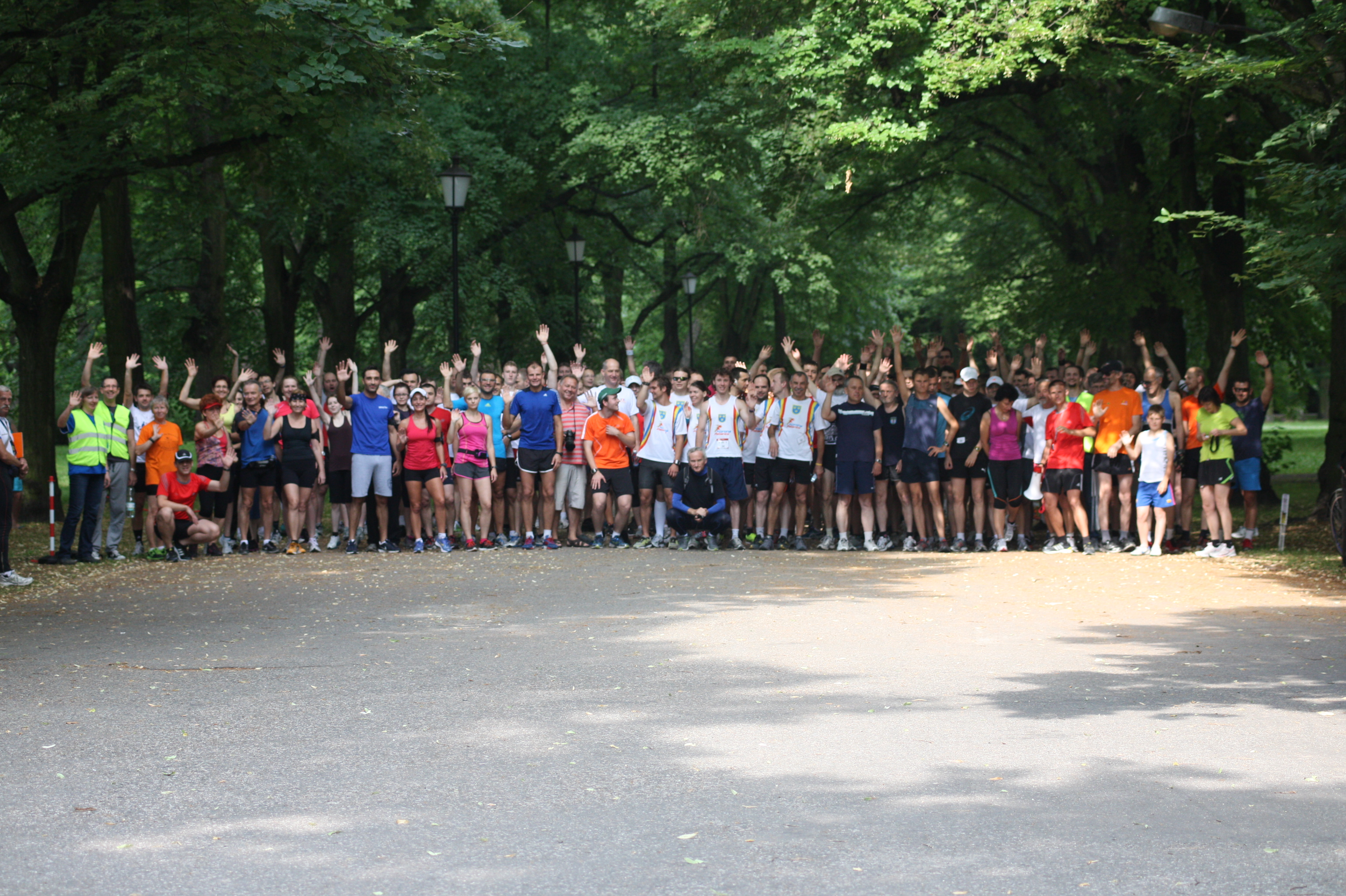
Participants lining up to start at Parkrun Łódź in Poland

The Bushy Parkrun was originally known as the Bushy Park Time Trial. Its results were timed with a stopwatch and recorded on paper; washers, each one stamped with a finish number, were used as finishing tokens.

Over the next two years, the event took place every week with the number of participants and volunteers growing, and with new technology introduced to streamline the processing of results. The second Time Trial was launched at Wimbledon Common in 2007; it was here that the model of having an identical structure at different locations began. That year saw a further six events established. They were initially known as UK Time Trials before the Parkrun name was adopted. Five more locations were added in 2008, including the first Parkruns in Scotland and Wales.

The first event outside the UK was launched in Zimbabwe in 2008, though this event no longer operates. The longest-running Parkrun outside of the UK was launched in Denmark in 2009. In 2010, there were 30 new events added including the first in Northern Ireland. In 2011, Parkrun began in South Africa and Australia, both of which have seen significant growth in event numbers, and Parkrun USA launched in 2012. Junior Parkrun started at Bushy Park in 2013. Sinton-Hewitt was appointed a CBE in 2014 for his "services to grassroots sport."

By 2015, more than 80,000 people were gathering in parks across the world each week to run, jog and walk a Parkrun – more than twice the number who take part in the annual London Marathon. In 2016, 1.1 million different people completed a Parkrun and 142,000 people volunteered.

In 2017, Parkrun Global Limited, the organisation which supports global Parkrun events, became a UK registered charity.

By 2018, approximately a quarter of a million runners took part weekly in 1,500 events, spread over 20 countries.

Parkrun events were closed from March 2020, due to the global COVID-19 pandemic. They resumed in England on 24 July 2021.

Permanent event closures are rare. Zimbabwe was the first country to host a Parkrun outside the UK; the event started in 2007, but closed several years later. Parkrun Elliðaárdalur closed in 2012, due to operational difficulties in the winter, and Hillerød Parkrun in Denmark closed in 2013. Camp Bastion Parkrun was hosted at a military base in Afghanistan, which shut in 2014. More frequently, Parkruns have formally closed at a location, but have relocated to a venue nearby and changed name.

In 2022, due to Russia's invasion of Ukraine, Parkrun banned its website for users from Russia and ended support for all its events there. The local running Parkrun community separated from the international community and continued weekly events at the same venues under the local brand 5 вёрст ("5 versts").

In 2022, Parkrun changed its rules to ban dogs running with owners where a waist-harness was used; participation was instead restricted to running with one dog on a short, hand-held lead. This was due to research that showed that where participants use waist harnesses, there was an "increased risk of serious incidents, particularly trips and falls, compared to when using handheld leads." A spokesperson said "More than 10% of incidents at Parkrun events involve dogs and, as such, we have spent significant time considering the nature, frequency and severity of dog-related incidents."

In 2024, statistics were removed from the Parkrun website, including course records, the most first finishes, sub-17 minute men and sub-20 minute women, age grade records and category records. In a statement to the BBC, Parkrun stated that this was as a result of investigations by a global working group looking at how their events could be less "off-putting" to potential participants. Parkrun also stated that "[we have] spent many months now making detailed investigations and recommendations. What was clear is that there was a disconnect between the performance data displayed so prominently on the site, and our mission to create opportunities for as many people as possible to take part in Parkrun events – especially those who are anxious about activities such as parkrun, but who potentially have an enormous amount to gain." A petition was created on Change.org that called for the changes to be reversed, on the basis that they provide "motivation and inspiration" to participants.

== Event outline ==
=== Participation ===
All Parkruns are 5 kilometres (3.1 mi) in length and are free to enter. Anyone can take part, including walkers. Participants include parents with their children, pensioners, people with their dogs, wheelchair users, people pushing prams, and club and casual runners; not all courses are suitable for all participants. Beginner runners, older adults and overweight people are common. Visually impaired runners and walkers are also able to participate, with the aid of trained guides.

Events usually take place weekly at the same time, at the same place and on the same course. There is no formal procedure before the run, with participants asked to arrive shortly before the start time and wait near to the starting line. A run director will make announcements giving safety instructions and community news before beginning the run. Participants run or walk the course and are directed by marshals along the correct route to the finish line.

As each runner enters the finish funnel, a volunteer records their finishing place and time. The results are uploaded to the Parkrun website, which also generates a number of statistics. The results available are: finishing position for both male and female runners, finish time, whether a personal best time has been achieved, the total number of runs completed by an individual, their age grade result and their position in relation to other veteran or junior runners.

To have a time recorded, runners need to register on the Parkrun website, print out a personal ID that includes a barcode and bring it to each event. Alternatively, they can download the barcode or QR code to a phone app or fitness/smart watch. Registration needs to be done just once, with the barcode valid for any subsequent Parkrun in the world. Runners can still participate without registering or if they forget to bring their personal barcode, but they will not have their time or participation recorded. If the runner does not have a barcode, their position on the finishers table will be recorded with the name "Unknown Athlete" and no time. After passing the finish line, each runner is handed a finish token, corresponding to their position; this is later scanned alongside their personal barcode, if they have one, to link their result with their Parkrun profile.

The Daily Telegraph reported that "what's clever is that it's not a race against everyone else but a timed run" and that trying to improve your personal best time is a great incentive even for slower runners. The paper further explained that the success of the events is down to them being free and weekly, because it allows people to get into a routine. Another Telegraph article said that a drop in gym usage can be attributed to a backlash against membership fees, combined with the popularity of events such as Parkrun and fitness tracking devices.

=== Parkrun locations ===
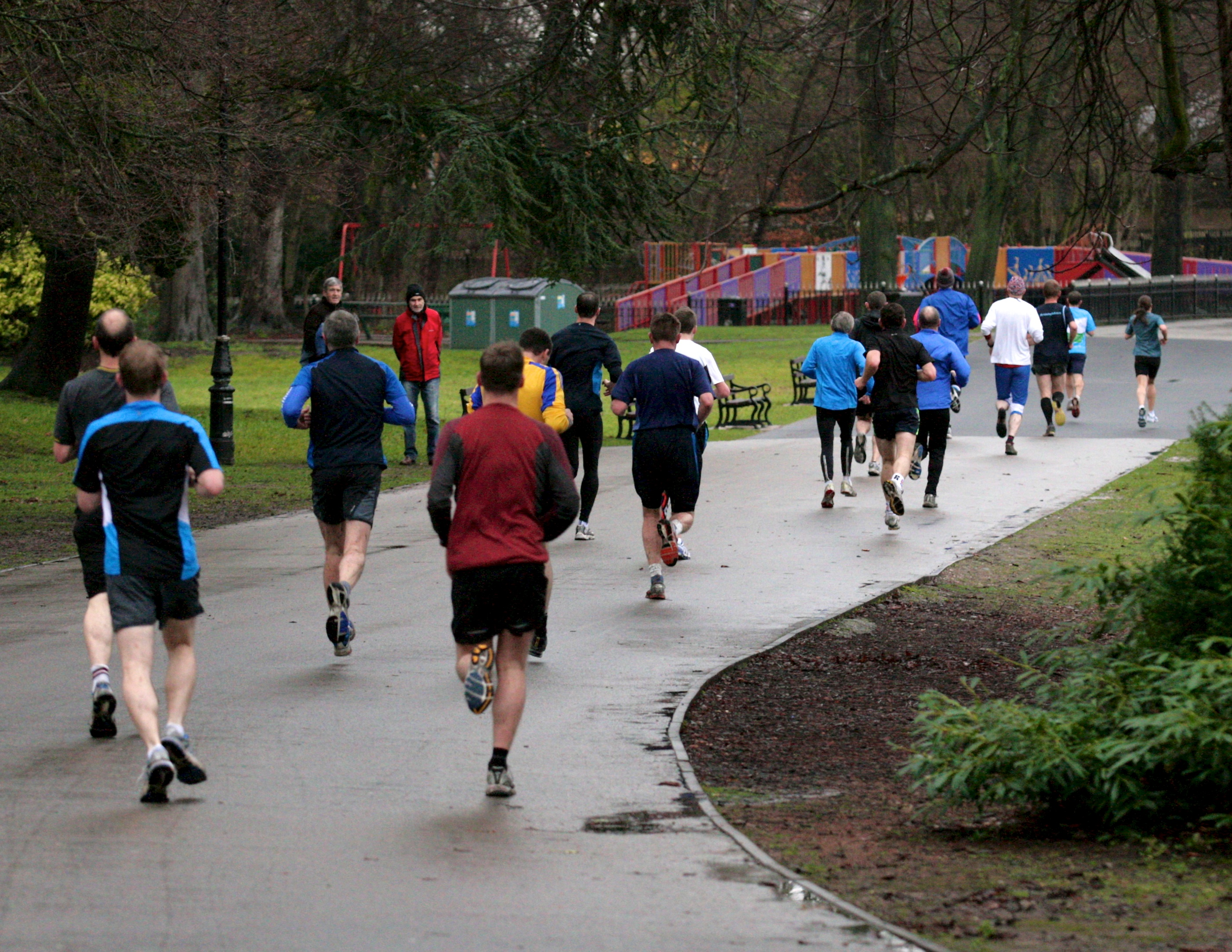
Cannon Hill Parkrun, in Birmingham, England, is run in a city park on tarmacked footpaths

Events take place in a range of locations and are not restricted to city parks; venues include country parks, national parks, the grounds of stately homes, castles, forests, rivers, lakes, reservoirs, beaches, promenades, prisons, racecourses and nature reserves. The runs have different degrees of difficulty, with hilly runs harder to complete than those that are flat. The running surface varies, with many city park Parkruns being run on tarmacked footpaths, closed roads, grass or a mixture of all three, while country park and forest Parkruns are more likely to be on trails. Runs that take place in hotter countries often start early in the morning, to avoid the excessive heat.

=== Volunteers ===
Each Parkrun event is run entirely by volunteers, who are integral to its not-for-profit status. There are several different volunteer roles at each Parkrun event. Each event has a volunteer webpage, with the same basic information about how to get involved as a volunteer, as well as crediting those who have made the effort in the most recent week.

At the outset of Parkrun, the central organisation sought to simplify the volunteering process to allow new events to be set up with a low number of volunteers; this simplification now allows new volunteers to assist with minimal training.

Each event has a core team, who has received sanction from Parkrun HQ and the location owner to stage the event. The individual roles are typically filled by different volunteers each week and include:

- a run director who manages the event, makes announcements and starts the run
- course safety checkers
- timekeepers
- marshals
- barcode scanners, who scan finishing tokens
- event setup and close down volunteers
- pacers
- tail walkers.

According to Steve Flowers at the University of Kent's business school, Parkrun is an example, along with Wikipedia, of what he calls "people's innovation"; The Guardian explains this as being "driven by users rather than producers, by volunteers rather than professionals." Volunteer roles, such as timekeeping and barcode scanning, use a free downloadable app to assist with the data collection and compilation.

Several surveys and academic studies have shown a net beneficial effect on health and wellbeing experienced among those who volunteer regularly at Parkruns.

=== Junior Parkrun ===
Junior Parkrun is a spin-off event that provides a 2-kilometre (1 1/4-mile) event for children aged 4–14, held on Sunday mornings. Parents and guardians are allowed to run with their children, but are not eligible for a placed finish. Dogs can be brought to the event, but are not allowed to run with their owners; volunteers cannot be accompanied by a dog. Juniors who have completed 10, 25, 50, 75, 100, 150, 200, 250 or 300 junior runs are awarded a coloured wristband.

Junior Parkrun takes place on Sunday mornings. When it was first launched, it was run monthly, on the first Sunday of every month; most events now take place weekly.

=== Milestone clubs ===
The number of runs by each participant at all events is posted on the Parkrun website. Milestone clubs are available when a runner has completed a sufficient number of events; milestones are available at 25, 50, 100, 250, 500 and 1000 runs. Members can, if they so wish, order a colour-coded t-shirt to commemorate their achievement which are coloured purple, red, black, green, blue and yellow, respectively. In September of 2026, more milestone shirts were announced featuring a new shirt colour for every 100 parkruns up to one thousand, with colours being light blue for 200, orange for 300, burgundy for 400, lime for 600, navy for 700, magenta for 800 and forest green for 900.

Juniors – those under the age of 18 – can claim a white T-shirt when they complete ten runs and there is a purple t-shirt for people who volunteer 25 times. The milestone and volunteer t-shirts were free until September 2021, at which point they became chargeable. At this time, additional volunteer t-shirts were introduced to align with the milestone t-shirts: 25 (purple), 50 (red), 100 (black), 250 (green), 500 (blue) and 1,000 (yellow).

=== Parkrun tourism and challenges ===
When participants sign up on the Parkrun website, they are asked to pick a Home Parkrun, usually the one they live closest to and are likely to frequent most. Parkrun tourists are broadly defined as anyone travelling to a run that is not their home Parkrun. Tourism can involve running in a neighbouring park, town, region or even country with some travelling to a different run every week.

Parkrun challenges involve completing a number of different runs in a particular way which are personally meaningful, but not officially recorded; these include LonDone, which is completing all of the events in London. The Alphabeteer is completing a Parkrun beginning with each letter of the alphabet except X (Note: As yet, there are no event names currently commencing with an 'X'.) and there are light-hearted challenges, such as the Bee Gees-themed Stayin' Alive which is completing three runs beginning with B and three beginning with G.

A Google Chrome and Firefox extension details further challenges, such as Groundhog Day, which is running the same time at the same Parkrun location in two consecutive weeks, and Regionnaire, which is to complete all of the events in any region. The official Parkrun app also includes a wide array of challenges, including achieving every position where the last two digits are 00 to 99, and the single and double ton, where one must attend (either run or volunteer) the same Parkrun 100 and 200 times respectively.

=== Individual running records ===
- Female record holder: Ciara Mageean on 23 December 2023, with a time of 15:13 at Victoria Park Parkrun in Belfast, Northern Ireland.
- Male record holder: Nick Griggs on 9 November 2024 with a time of 13:44 at Victoria Park Parkrun in Belfast, Northern Ireland.
- Age-graded record holder: Fauja Singh on 31 March 2012, the day before his 101st birthday, with a time of 38:34 and an age grading of 179.04% at Valentines Parkrun, Ilford, London.
- Global record holder for highest number of runs: Darren Wood with 1,000 runs, as of 30 May 2026.
- Global record holder for the highest number of different events: Paul Freyne with 707 different Parkrun locations, as of 23 November 2024.

=== Funding ===
Parkrun events are free of charge to participants and run principally by volunteers. Parkrun income comes from sponsorship and grants, with commercial income from apparel, wristbands and accessories. Parkrun Global Limited receives all funds; it is a registered charity in England and Wales and, in 2022, it reported income of £5.5m with expenditure of £4.3m.

== Reception ==
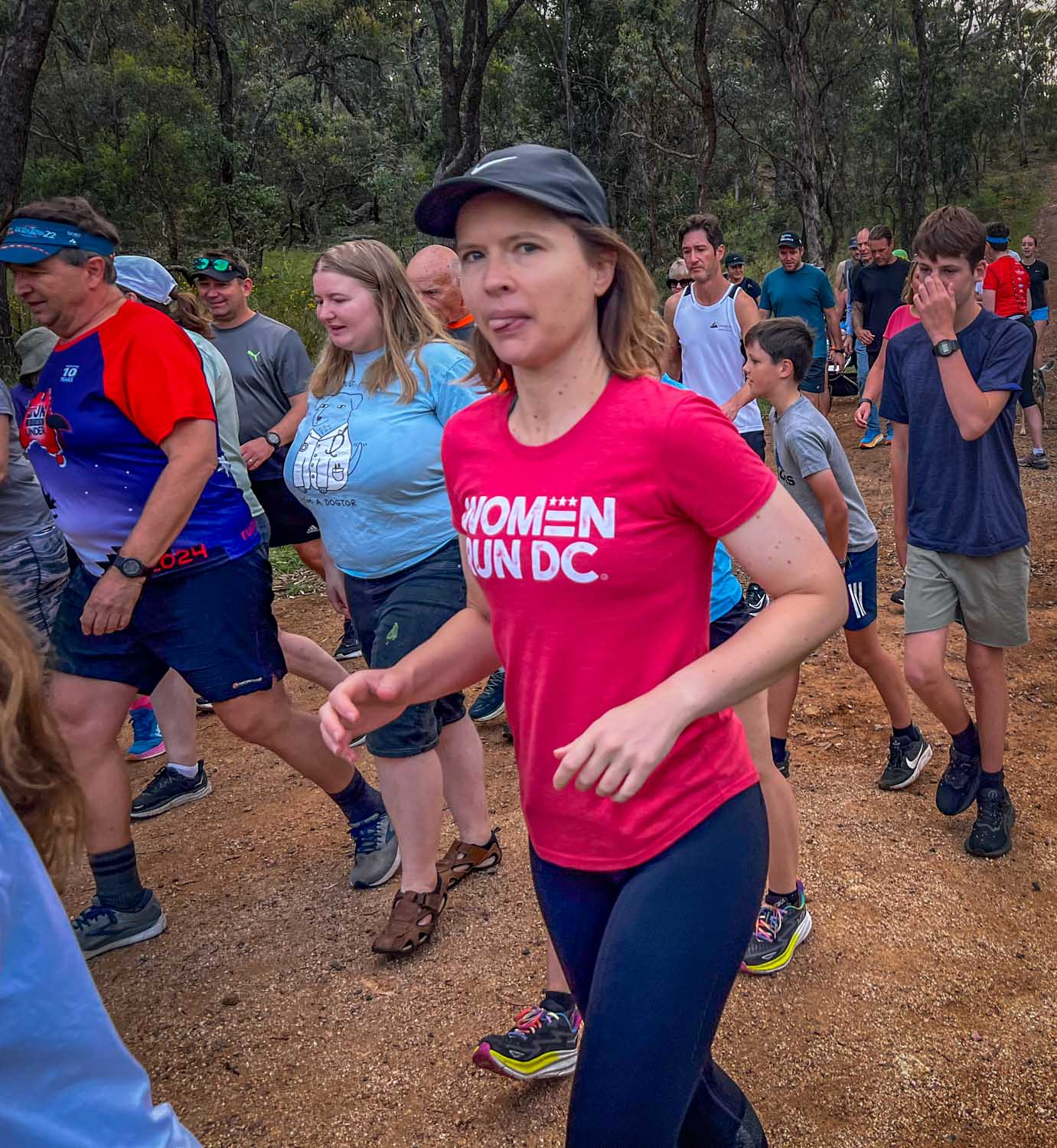
Runners participating in a parkrun in Canberra, Australia

A 2013 article in The Guardian noted the rapid growth of Parkrun and suggested this was mainly due to its simplicity and accessibility; runners register on-line once, turn up at any event and run. Inclusivity is also a factor, as it is open to participants with a wide range of running abilities. These include people from fast club runners to those walking, and a wide range of ages from children running with their parents to the elderly; wheelchair users, those pushing buggies and people running with their dogs are also allowed.

Commenting in The Independent in 2018, chief sports writer Jonathan Liew said: "Parkrun is not simply one of the biggest sporting events in the world, but one of the most important, largely because it entirely upends what we have long been told sport is about." He discusses how sport has become ever more something the public pay to watch, packaged ever more expensively, with the sports people's lives tipping over into light entertainment, concluding: "Parkrun offers something entirely different: community, opportunity, the outdoors, the simple pleasure of sport and people. In so doing, it has resurrected a vision of sport that has been in recession for a generation."

=== Research ===
The Journal of Public Health reported in a 2013 study of 7,308 Parkrun participants that the events attracted people who described themselves as non-runners, with women, older adults and overweight people being well represented. It added that participation problems have been minimised, with no upper age limit, no special equipment and no cost. While some participants ran before entering their first event, some are new to exercise; Parkrun offered the opportunity and support to become active on a continuous weekly basis.

A 2015 qualitative study by the University of Loughborough found that runners attending a Parkrun for the first time were typically motivated for weight loss or an improvement in their physical fitness. On the other hand, there were a range of motivations for runners to continue regularly taking part, with runners wanting to beat their personal record time, reach a certain number of runs and join a milestone club, enjoy being outdoors, make new friends through volunteering, and meeting up with existing friends or family.

=== Transgender participation ===
In the mid-2020s, Parkrun came under fire several times for allowing transgender women to register as women, despite the event being a fun-run and not a sporting competition; particularly after a report was published by right-wing think tank The Policy Exchange calling for Parkrun to be stripped of public funding unless it banned trans women from registering as women. This call received considerable press coverage, and was echoed by longtime campaigners Sharron Davies – who called the organisation "cowardly" for not forcing transgender participants into their own separate category – and Martina Navratilova, who described the allowance of transgender women to participate as "alienating" women and "taking away dreams."

== Community ==
=== Health initiatives ===
Parkrun endeavours to promote health and wellbeing through a number of initiatives. Its mission statement is "a healthier and happier planet." In the UK, Parkrun has partnered with the Royal College of General Practitioners in order to promote healthy living through increased physical activity, socialisation and mutual support.

In Ireland, the long-running Operation Transformation TV show has partnered with Parkrun on several occasions, encouraging viewers to join local Parkruns that held special Couch to 5K programmes to coincide with the series.

=== Relations with local authorities ===
Most events are run with the support, and sometimes the sponsorship, of local authorities. A notable conflict occurred at Little Stoke Parkrun. Parkrun does not set up events where charges would apply to the organisers or runners. This event had begun with the council's permission in November 2012.

In April 2016, the responsible parish council in Stoke Gifford, Bristol, voted to charge runners a fee to participate. Despite an online petition and support from the Minister for Sport, the council would not change its decision, so the event there was permanently cancelled. In April 2017, the British Government proposed that, in future, local councils in England would not be allowed to charge for Parkruns in a public park.

== Events around the world ==
=== Australia ===
The first Australian Parkrun event was held at Main Beach, on the Gold Coast, on 2 April 2011. ABC News said "there are competitive runners aiming to win but there are just as many people running for the fun of it. If people want to race each other, that's fine, they can, but if you want to walk that is fine too. Everyone is welcome, from kids to grandparents, it's one of the few sporting events that a family can do together." The one millionth runner completed Parkrun in Australia in January 2024. As of 16 November 2026, there are 554 Parkrun locations in Australia.

=== Germany ===
The first three Parkruns in Germany were Georgengarten in Hannover, Küchenholz in Leipzig and Neckarau in Mannheim, all of which hosted their first event on 2 December 2017. When Aachener Weiher Parkrun started in Cologne, it became the first in the alphabetical list of all events. As of 16 November 2026, there are 83 Parkrun locations in Germany.

=== Ireland ===
The first run in Ireland was at Malahide Castle, north of Dublin, on 10 November 2012. The rollout of Parkruns in Ireland was assisted by funding from the government's Department of Health, with the aim of empowering local communities and encouraging individuals and families to lead active lives. The record attendance was at Anne's Parkrun in Dublin on 30 September 2023, when there were 911 runners. As of 16 November 2026, there are 118 Parkrun locations in Ireland.

=== Japan ===
Parkrun was introduced to Japan on 6 April 2019, by the Futako-Tamagawa Parkrun event in Tokyo. As of 16 November 2026, there are now 54 events held every Saturday morning in Japan.

=== Lithuania ===
The most recent country to start a Parkrun event is Lithuania, with the launch of Parkrun Vingis in Vilnius on 21 September 2024; there were 223 participants in attendance for the first event. As of 16 November 26, there are 5 Parkrun events in Lithuania.

=== New Zealand ===
The first event was at Lower Hutt on 5 May 2012. Cornwall Parkrun in Auckland started on 28 July 2012. As of 16 November 2026, there were 81 Parkrun events around the country taking place every weekend, with more locations being added all of the time.

=== Poland ===
The first Polish Parkrun took place in Gdynia on 15 October 2011. Poland has the first Parkrun to cross the border of another country; Cieszyn Parkrun starts in Poland, but crosses into the Czech Republic before returning to Poland. The record attendance was at Tczew Parkrun on 13 May 2023, when there were 1,774 runners. As of 16 November 2026, there are 109 Parkrun events in Poland.

=== Russia ===
Parkrun in Russia began simultaneously at Kolomenskoe and Severnoe Tushino Parkruns on 1 March 2014. Parkrun Yakutsk Dohsun took place in Yakutsk, which has an average daily temperature of −8.8 °C (16.2 °F).

All Parkrun events in Russia are currently cancelled, due to the ongoing Russian invasion of Ukraine.

=== South Africa ===
Parkrun South Africa was started and promoted by ultramarathoner Bruce Fordyce. The first Parkrun took place at Delta Park in Johannesburg on 12 November 2011 and had 26 participants. It is now one of the larger Parkruns, regularly drawing up to 1,200 runners and attracting tourists as the first one in the nation. The world record attendance was at North Beach, Durban, which saw 2,527 runners on 20 January 2018.

=== United States ===
The first US Parkrun event was held in Livonia, Michigan on 2 June 2012. As of 30 November 2026, there are 103 active events.

== Festive and special events ==
There are festive and special events which do not necessarily occur on a Saturday. Each country chooses its own special event days, which are held optionally by local Parkrun teams – i.e. they will not be run at every Parkrun location. Generally, where such special events are held, there are Parkruns on Christmas Day, New Year's Day and/or national holidays in their respective countries.

== List of Parkrun event countries ==
Parkrun is held currently in 29 of the 30 different countries and territories listed below, as of 16 November 2026:

Country or territory	No. of locations	Citation	First event name	First event location	First event date
United Kingdom	930	(Note: Run under the jurisdiction of Parkrun UK are eight events, which take place on British islands and territories outside of the United Kingdom, so the total has been reduced accordingly. UK events include those for Jersey, Guernsey and Isle of Man, which each have one event and are Crown Dependencies. British Overseas Territories have five events: one in the Falkland Islands, one on Akrotiri Sovereign Base Area in Cyprus, one in Gibraltar, one in Saint Helena, and one in the Caymen Islands.)	Bushy	London	2 October 2004
Australia	554		Main Beach	Gold Coast	2 April 2011
South Africa	226	(Note: Run under the jurisdiction of Parkrun South Africa are those for Namibia (3) and Eswatini (2); the total for South Africa has been reduced accordingly.)	Delta	Johannesburg	12 November 2011
(Republic of Ireland) Ireland	118		Malahide	Dublin	10 November 2012
Poland	109	(Note: The Cieszyn Parkrun course includes a section that crosses over the Olza river, which marks the border with neighbouring Czech Republic; it is therefore the only Parkrun event that crosses a national border and takes place across two countries.)	Gdynia	Gdynia	15 October 2011
United States	103		Livonia	Livonia	2 June 2012
Germany	83		Georgengarten, Küchenholz, Neckarau (Note: These three events started on the same day.)	Hannover, Leipzig, Mannheim	2 December 2017
New Zealand	81		Lower Hutt	Lower Hutt	5 May 2012
Canada	68		Okanagan	Kelowna	20 August 2016
Japan	54		Futakotamagawa	Tokyo	6 April 2019
Netherlands	32		Stadspark, Maxima, Kralingse Bos, Goffert, Karpendonkse Plas and Tapijn	Groningen, Utrecht, Rotterdam, Nijmegen, Eindhoven and Maastricht	29 February 2020
Italy	17		Uditore	Palermo	23 May 2015
Sweden	16		Haga	Stockholm	27 August 2016
Norway	14		Tøyen	Oslo	26 August 2017
Denmark	14		Amager Fælled	Copenhagen	16 May 2009
Finland	10		Tampere	Tampere	14 October 2017
France ‡	8	(Note: This is due to Parkrun not having sufficient assurance that it is able to fully comply with French legal obligations.)	Les Dougnes	Cubnezais	6 May 2015
Austria	6		Hellbrunn	Salzburg	14 August 2021
Singapore	6		East Coast Park	Singapore	21 June 2014
Lithuania	5		Vingis Park	Vilnius	21 September 2024
Namibia	3		Swakopmund	Swakopmund	8 April 2017
Eswatini	2		Mbabane	Mbabane	6 May 2017
Malaysia	3		Taman Pudu Ulu	Kuala Lumpur	14 April 2018
(United Kingdom) Akrotiri and Dhekelia	1	(Note: The event takes place on a UK military base, which is closed to the general public.)	Akrotiri	Akrotiri and Dhekelia	8 January 2022
Falkland Islands	1		Cape Pembroke Lighthouse	Stanley	26 October 2019
Guernsey	1		Guernsey	L'Ancresse	9 April 2016
Isle of Man	1		Nobles	Douglas	21 October 2017
Jersey	1		Jersey	Saint Brelade	26 September 2015
Gibraltar	1		Gibraltar Botanic Gardens	Gibraltar Botanic Gardens	14 February 2026
Saint Helena	1		Plantation Forest	Saint Paul's, Saint Helena	11 July 2026
Cayman Islands	1		Festival Green	Camana Bay, Cayman Islands	29 August 2026

Two nations' Parkrun events are suspended:

- France ‡ – from July 2022, due to legal issues regarding medical certification.
- Russia – from March 2022, due to the Russian invasion of Ukraine. The Parkrun CEO, Russ Jefferys, explained the suspension, saying the war "directly conflicts with our charitable objective of promoting health and happiness across the world" and that Parkrun volunteers "should not be put in a position in which they are forced to justify why Parkrun events remain open or have to explain their personal politics in a country where that would put them at risk."

== List of Junior Parkrun event countries ==
The following table lists countries that host Junior Parkruns, as of 16 August 2025:

Country	No. of locations	Citation	First event name	First event location	First event date
United Kingdom	478		Bushy	London	1 April 2010
(Republic of Ireland) Ireland	42		Rush	Dublin	13 December 2015
Australia	5		Southport	Southport	22 April 2018
Jersey	1		Waterfront	St Helier	21 July 2019
Guernsey	1		Cambridge Park	St Peter Port	TBA - 2026

== See also ==
- Outdoor fitness
- 5K run
