= Antipass Kwari =

Zimbabwean cyclist (born 1975)

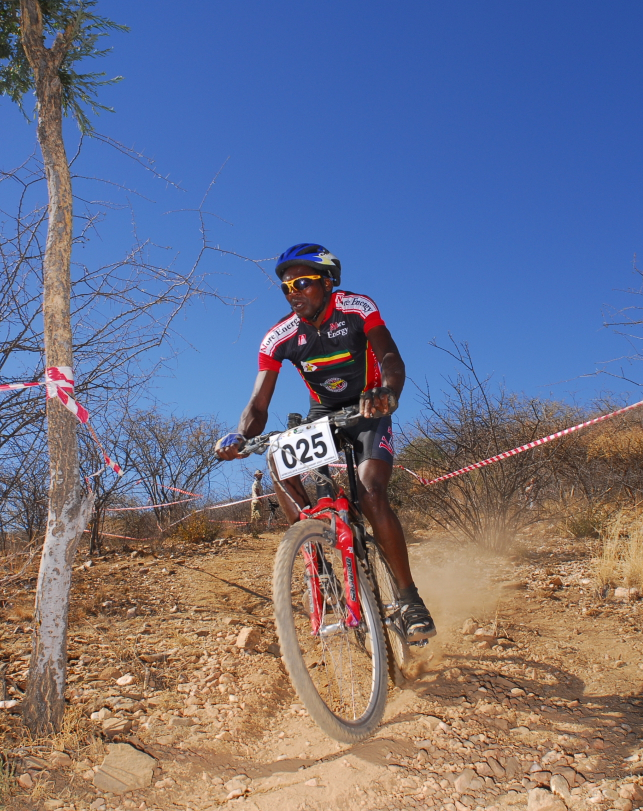
- Kwari racing, 2007

Personal information
- Born: 1975 (age 50–51)

Cycling career
- Sport: Cycling
- Discipline: Mountain bike
- Role: Rider

Professional team
- ?: Zimbabwe Mountain Bike team

Antipass Kwari (born 1975) is a Zimbabwean cyclist. He was the 2005 Zimbabwe mountain bike champion and represented his country at the 2007 African Mountainbike Championships which were held in Windhoek, Namibia where he placed 8th. In doing so Kwari qualified for the 2008 Olympic Games held in Beijing, where he finished 48th in the men's cross country race.

In 2007, Kwari and the Zimbabwe Mountain Bike team created history when they became the very first Zimbabwe Mountain Bike team to race in an official UCI international race. They competed at the 2007 UCI African MTB Championship, which was held in Windhoek. Zimbabwe had in previous seasons raced in the road cycling discipline but never at mountain biking.

== See also ==
- Zimbabwe Cycling Federation
