= 2002 African Championships in Athletics – Men's 100 metres =

The men's 100 metres event at the 2002 African Championships in Athletics was held in Radès, Tunisia on August 6–7.

== Medalists ==
Gold	Silver	Bronze
Frankie Fredericks; Namibia	Uchenna Emedolu; Nigeria	Idrissa Sanou; Burkina Faso

== Results ==
=== Heats ===
Wind:
Heat 1: +2.4 m/s, Heat 2: +2.1 m/s, Heat 3: +2.6 m/s, Heat 4: +0.7 m/s, Heat 5: +2.3 m/s

Rank	Heat	Name	Nationality	Time	Notes
1	1	Frankie Fredericks	Namibia	10.23	Q
2	1	Serge Bengono	Cameroon	10.32	Q
3	4	Hadhari Djaffar	Comoros	10.38	Q
4	2	Idrissa Sanou	Burkina Faso	10.40	Q
5	3	Christie van Wyk	Namibia	10.43	Q
6	1	Abid Abdenhi	Morocco	10.44	Q
7	1	Mansour Noubigh	Tunisia	10.48	Q
8	4	Ismael Daif	Morocco	10.50	Q
9	2	Yves Sonan	Ivory Coast	10.55	Q
10	1	Abu Duah	Ghana	10.58	q
11	4	Malang Sané	Senegal	10.59	Q
12	4	Souhalia Alamou	Benin	10.60	Q
13	2	Mohamed Nhili	Morocco	10.64	Q
14	2	Abraham Morlu	Liberia	10.65	Q
14	3	Yacine Djellil	Algeria	10.65	Q
16	2	Marius Loua	Ivory Coast	10.68	q
17	4	Souleymane Meité	Ivory Coast	10.87	q
18	3	David Victoire	Mauritius	10.92	Q
19	3	Wilfried Bingangoye	Gabon	10.97	Q
20	1	Fonseca Neto	Angola	11.04	q
21	4	Yvon Ngova Ngema	Gabon	11.09	q
22	1	Emmanuel Kaidu	Chad	11.18	q
22	4	Fawzi Abdulsalam	Libya	11.18	q
24	5	Uchenna Emedolu	Nigeria	11.24	Q
25	5	Norberto Nsue Ondo	Equatorial Guinea	11.34	Q
	1	Tamunosiki Atorudibo	Nigeria	DNS	
	2	Alfred Moussambani	Cameroon	DNS	
	2	Deji Aliu	Nigeria	DNS	
	2	Eric Nkansah	Ghana	DNS	
	3	Joseph Brent	Liberia	DNS	
	3	Samuel Shintu Kibambe	Democratic Republic of the Congo	DNS	
	3	Abdul Aziz Zakari	Ghana	DNS	
	3	Samuel Randall	Sierra Leone	DNS	
	4	Atumani	Democratic Republic of the Congo	DNS	
	4	Adekemi Doherty	Sierra Leone	DNS	
	5	Roger Angouono-Moke	Republic of the Congo	DNS	
	5	Kidane Job	Eritrea	DNS	
	5	Mohamed Konaté	Mauritania	DNS	
	5	Ali Maman Sani	Niger	DNS	
	5	Gibrilla Bangura	Sierra Leone	DNS	
	5	Moumi Sébergué	Chad	DNS	

=== Semifinals ===
Wind:
Heat 1: +1.9 m/s, Heat 2: +1.2 m/s (or +2.1 m/s), Heat 3: +2.6 m/s

Rank	Heat	Name	Nationality	Time	Notes
1	3	Christie van Wyk	Namibia	10.20	Q
2	1	Serge Bengono	Cameroon	10.26	Q
3	3	Idrissa Sanou	Burkina Faso	10.34	Q
4	2	Uchenna Emedolu	Nigeria	10.38	Q
5	3	Mansour Noubigh	Tunisia	10.41	q
6	1	Frankie Fredericks	Namibia	10.47	Q
7	2	Abid Abdenhi	Morocco	10.48	Q
8	1	Malang Sané	Senegal	10.57	q
9	1	Ismael Daif	Morocco	10.61	
10	3	Souhalia Alamou	Benin	10.62	
11	2	Yves Sonan	Ivory Coast	10.63	
12	2	Abraham Morlu	Liberia	10.68	
13	3	Yacine Djellil	Algeria	10.69	
14	1	Abu Duah	Ghana	10.70	
15	1	Mohamed Nhili	Morocco	10.82	
16	2	Marius Loua	Ivory Coast	10.84	
17	1	Wilfried Bingangoye	Gabon	10.98	
18	2	Alfred Engone	Gabon	11.17	
19	3	Norberto Nsue Ondo	Equatorial Guinea	11.30	
20	2	Hadhari Djaffar	Comoros	36.41	
	1	Fawzi Abdulsalam	Libya	DNS	
	1	Emmanuel Kaidu	Chad	DNS	
	2	David Victoire	Mauritius	DNS	
	3	Souleymane Meité	Ivory Coast	DNS	
	3	Fonseca Neto	Angola	DNS	

=== Final ===
Wind: +3.8 m/s

Rank	Name	Nationality	Time	Notes
1st place, gold medalist(s)	Frankie Fredericks	Namibia	9.93	
2nd place, silver medalist(s)	Uchenna Emedolu	Nigeria	10.00	
3rd place, bronze medalist(s)	Idrissa Sanou	Burkina Faso	10.16	
4	Christie van Wyk	Namibia	10.30	
5	Serge Bengono	Cameroon	10.33	
6	Malang Sané	Senegal	10.44	
7	Abid Abdenhi	Morocco	10.48	
8	Mansour Noubigh	Tunisia	21.32	
