= Athletics at the 2003 All-Africa Games – Men's 100 metres =

The men's 100 metres at the 2003 All-Africa Games were held on October 11–12.

== Medalists ==
Gold	Silver	Bronze
Deji Aliu; Nigeria (NGR)	Uchenna Emedolu; Nigeria (NGR)	Leonard Myles-Mills; Ghana (GHA)}

== Results ==
=== Heats ===
Qualification: First 3 of each heat (Q) and the next 3 fastest (q) qualified for the semifinals.

Wind:
Heat 1: -0.1 m/s, Heat 2: -0.4 m/s, Heat 3: +0.1 m/s, Heat 4: +0.4 m/s, Heat 5: 0.0 m/s, Heat 6: 0.0 m/s, Heat 7: +0.3 m/s

Rank	Heat	Name	Nationality	Time	Notes
1	2	Aziz Zakari	Ghana	10.31	Q
2	2	Aaron Egbele	Nigeria	10.34	Q
3	3	Uchenna Emedolu	Nigeria	10.41	Q
4	3	Roger Angouono-Moke	Republic of the Congo	10.46	Q
5	6	Leonard Myles-Mills	Ghana	10.47	Q
6	5	Éric Pacôme N'Dri	Ivory Coast	10.48	Q
7	6	Souhalia Alamou	Benin	10.49	Q
8	1	Deji Aliu	Nigeria	10.51	Q
8	4	Eric Nkansah	Ghana	10.51	Q
10	3	Sherwin Vries	South Africa	10.53	Q
10	5	Idrissa Sanou	Burkina Faso	10.53	Q
12	7	Jaysuma Saidy Ndure	Gambia	10.56	Q
13	5	Godwin Tauya	Zimbabwe	10.61	Q
14	7	Marius Loua	Ivory Coast	10.66	Q
15	4	Abraham Koiyan Morlu	Liberia	10.67	Q
16	7	Dieudonné Tiekim	Cameroon	10.69	Q
17	1	Gora Diop	Senegal	10.70	Q
18	2	Clinton Venter	South Africa	10.73	Q
18	7	Lamin Tucker	Sierra Leone	10.73	q
20	3	Emmanuel Ngom Priso	Cameroon	10.75	q
21	4	Tlhalosang Molapisi	Botswana	10.76	Q
22	6	Mathew Quinn	South Africa	10.78	Q
23	1	Aiah Yambasu	Sierra Leone	10.82	Q
23	5	Makame Ally	Tanzania	10.82	q
25	6	Joseph Hegba Mbayen	Cameroon	10.88	
26	1	Abubaker El Gatroni	Libya	10.89	
26	5	Chelly Goualetou-Nomala	Republic of the Congo	10.89	
28	1	Kebba Fatty	Gambia	10.93	
29	6	Sandy Walker	Sierra Leone	10.96	
30	3	Alvain Mahamatabbo	Chad	11.29	
31	2	Correia Domingos	Guinea-Bissau	11.38	
32	4	Valdemar Afonso	São Tomé and Príncipe	11.40	
33	7	Amanuel Ghebrengus	Eritrea	11.62	
	1	Sayon Cooper	Liberia	DNS	
	2	Thierry Adanabou	Burkina Faso	DNS	
	2	Béranger Aymard Bosse	Central African Republic	DNS	
	2	Sergio Mba Nzo	Equatorial Guinea	DNS	
	3	Wilfried Bingangoye	Gabon	DNS	
	4	Jacques Sambou	Senegal	DNS	
	5	Koffi Kouadio	Ivory Coast	DNS	
	5	Stellan Ndibi	Gabon	DNS	
	5	Enri-Cristol Ndong Nkara	Equatorial Guinea	DNS	
	6	Cyriaque Ayard	Central African Republic	DNS	
	6	Frederick Kimou	Ivory Coast	DNS	
	6	Moussa Camara	Guinea	DNS	
	7	Oury Temam Kamte	Equatorial Guinea	DNS	
	7	Sékou Sylla	Guinea	DNS	
	7	Christie van Wyk	Namibia	DNS	

=== Semifinals ===
Qualification: First 2 of each semifinal (Q) and the next 2 fastest (q) qualified for the final.

Wind:
Heat 1: +0.7 m/s, Heat 2: +0.2 m/s, Heat 3: -1.0 m/s

Rank	Heat	Name	Nationality	Time	Notes
1	1	Deji Aliu	Nigeria	10.11	Q
1	2	Uchenna Emedolu	Nigeria	10.11	Q
3	1	Aziz Zakari	Ghana	10.12	Q
4	2	Eric Nkansah	Ghana	10.16	Q
5	3	Leonard Myles-Mills	Ghana	10.20	Q
6	3	Aaron Egbele	Nigeria	10.22	Q
7	3	Éric Pacôme N'Dri	Ivory Coast	10.30	q
8	2	Idrissa Sanou	Burkina Faso	10.38	q
9	3	Sherwin Vries	South Africa	10.39	
10	3	Souhalia Alamou	Benin	10.46	
11	2	Roger Angouono-Moke	Republic of the Congo	10.49	
12	1	Clinton Venter	South Africa	10.50	
13	3	Godwin Tauya	Zimbabwe	10.55	
14	3	Emmanuel Ngom Priso	Cameroon	10.57	
15	1	Abraham Koiyan Morlu	Liberia	10.61	
16	1	Marius Loua	Ivory Coast	10.66	
17	2	Mathew Quinn	South Africa	10.73	
18	1	Jaysuma Saidy Ndure	Gambia	10.74	
19	2	Gora Diop	Senegal	10.75	
19	3	Aiah Yambasu	Sierra Leone	10.75	
21	2	Dieudonné Tiekim	Cameroon	10.76	
22	1	Tlhalosang Molapisi	Botswana	10.77	
23	1	Lamin Tucker	Sierra Leone	10.83	
24	1	Makame Ally	Tanzania	10.86	

=== Final ===
Wind: +0.6 m/s

Rank	Name	Nationality	Time	Notes
1st place, gold medalist(s)	Deji Aliu	Nigeria	9.95	
2nd place, silver medalist(s)	Uchenna Emedolu	Nigeria	9.97	
3rd place, bronze medalist(s)	Leonard Myles-Mills	Ghana	10.03	
4	Eric Nkansah	Ghana	10.18	
5	Aaron Egbele	Nigeria	10.39	
6	Éric Pacôme N'Dri	Ivory Coast	10.45	
7	Aziz Zakari	Ghana	10.46	
8	Idrissa Sanou	Burkina Faso	10.57	
