= 2002 African Championships in Athletics – Men's 200 metres =

The men's 200 metres event at the 2002 African Championships in Athletics was held in Radès, Tunisia on August 9–10.

== Medalists ==
Gold	Silver	Bronze
Frankie Fredericks; Namibia	Aziz Zakari; Ghana	Oumar Loum; Senegal

== Results ==
=== Heats ===
Wind:
Heat 1: +0.8 m/s, Heat 2: +0.8 m/s, Heat 3: +1.9 m/s, Heat 4: +1.6 m/s

Rank	Heat	Name	Nationality	Time	Notes
1	4	Oumar Loum	Senegal	21.10	Q
2	3	Jacques Sambou	Senegal	21.16	Q
2	3	Joseph Batangdon	Cameroon	21.16	Q
4	1	Frankie Fredericks	Namibia	21.32	Q
5	1	Mohammed Nhili	Morocco	21.35	Q
6	4	Nabil Jabir	Morocco	21.45	Q
7	3	Sylvester Nauta	Namibia	21.52	Q
8	2	Young Talkmore Nyongani	Zimbabwe	21.53	Q
9	2	Ismael Daif	Morocco	21.59	Q
10	2	Aziz Zakari	Ghana	21.64	Q
11	3	Ommanansdsingh Kowlessur	Mauritius	21.65	q
12	2	Joseph Brent	Liberia	21.77	q
12	4	Marius Loua	Ivory Coast	21.77	Q
14	1	Abraham Morlu	Liberia	21.78	Q
15	2	Matuipi Katjiuonga	Namibia	21.88	q
16	1	Yves Sonan	Ivory Coast	21.99	q
17	4	Abubaker El Tawerghi	Libya	22.06	
18	1	Evans Marie	Seychelles	22.34	
19	2	Antonio N'Zovo	Angola	22.59	
20	4	Amaniel Ghebrenous	Eritrea	22.62	
21	3	Vital Manibakiza	Rwanda	22.69	
22	1	Fonseca Neto	Angola	22.84	
23	1	Emmanuel Kaidu	Chad	22.88	
	1	Arcadius Fanou	Benin	DNS	
	2	Idrissa Sanou	Burkina Faso	DNS	
	2	Éric Pacôme N'Dri	Ivory Coast	DNS	
	3	Mansour Noubigh	Tunisia	DNS	
	3	Uchenna Emedolu	Nigeria	DNS	
	4	Harry Adu Nfum	Ghana	DNS	
	4	Ezrah Sambu	Kenya	DNS	
	4	Taiwo Ajibade	Nigeria	DNS	

=== Semifinals ===
Wind:
Heat 1: +2.3 m/s, Heat 2: +1.7 m/s

Rank	Heat	Name	Nationality	Time	Notes
1	1	Oumar Loum	Senegal	20.47	Q
2	1	Joseph Batangdon	Cameroon	20.73	Q
3	1	Ismael Daif	Morocco	20.99	Q
4	2	Frankie Fredericks	Namibia	21.06	Q
5	2	Aziz Zakari	Ghana	21.10	Q
6	2	Nabil Jabir	Morocco	21.24	Q
7	2	Jacques Sambou	Senegal	21.24	q
8	1	Young Talkmore Nyongani	Zimbabwe	21.26	q
9	1	Ommanansdsingh Kowlessur	Mauritius	21.57	
10	2	Marius Loua	Ivory Coast	21.75	
11	1	Sylvester Nauta	Namibia	21.76	
11	2	Joseph Brent	Liberia	21.76	
13	2	Matuipi Katjiuonga	Namibia	21.89	
14	1	Abraham Morlu	Liberia	22.00	
	1	Yves Sonan	Ivory Coast	DNS	
	2	Mohammed Nhili	Morocco	DNS	

=== Final ===
Wind: +2.4 m/s

Rank	Name	Nationality	Time	Notes
1st place, gold medalist(s)	Frankie Fredericks	Namibia	20.10	
2nd place, silver medalist(s)	Aziz Zakari	Ghana	20.33	
3rd place, bronze medalist(s)	Oumar Loum	Senegal	20.37	
4	Joseph Batangdon	Cameroon	20.47	
5	Young Talkmore Nyongani	Zimbabwe	21.16	
6	Nabil Jabir	Morocco	21.18	
7	Ismael Daif	Morocco	21.27	
8	Jacques Sambou	Senegal	21.47	
