= Athletics at the 2004 Summer Olympics – Men's 100 metres =

Men's 100 metres at the Games of the XXVIII Olympiad
- Olympic Athletics
- Venue: Athens Olympic Stadium
- Date: 21–22 August
- Competitors: 82 from 62 nations
- Winning time: 9.85 s

Medalists
1st place, gold medalist(s)		Justin Gatlin	United States
2nd place, silver medalist(s)		Francis Obikwelu	Portugal
3rd place, bronze medalist(s)		Maurice Greene	United States

The men's 100 metres was one of 23 track events of the athletics at the 2004 Summer Olympics, in Athens. It was contested at the Athens Olympic Stadium, from August 21 to 22, by a total of 82 sprinters from 62 nations. Each nation was limited to 3 athletes per rules in force since the 1930 Olympic Congress.

The event was won by Justin Gatlin of the United States, the nation's second consecutive title and 16th overall in the event. Portugal earned its first medal in the men's 100 metres, with Francis Obikwelu's silver. The final was the fastest and most disputed in Olympic history, with six runners covering the distance in 10.00 seconds or less (four of them under the 9.90 mark), and the gold and bronze medalist athletes separated by 0.02 seconds.

The medals for the competition were presented by Juan Antonio Samaranch, IOC Honorary President for Life, Spain; and the medalists' bouquets were presented by Lamine Diack, IAAF President, Senegal.

== Background ==
This was the twenty-fifth time the event was held, having appeared at every Olympics since the first in 1896. All three finalists from 2000 returned: defending gold medalist Maurice Greene of the United States, silver medalist Ato Boldon of Trinidad and Tobago, and bronze medalist Obadele Thompson of Barbados, along with three other finalists (Darren Campbell of Great Britain, Kim Collins of Saint Kitts and Nevis, and Aziz Zakari of Ghana). Two-time silver medalist (1992 and 1996) Frankie Fredericks of Namibia also returned after missing the Sydney Games with injury.

Collins was the reigning (2003) world champion, as well as Commonwealth champion. Francis Obikwelu of Portugal had won the 2002 European Championship. On the United States team, along with an aging Greene (still a medal contender, but no longer as dominant as in 2000), was a young Justin Gatlin.

Aruba, Jordan, Kiribati, the Federated States of Micronesia, and Slovenia appeared in the event for the first time. The United States made its 24rd appearance in the event, most of any country, having missed only the boycotted 1980 Games.

== Qualification ==
The Olympic qualification period for the athletics ran from 1 January 2003 to 9 August 2004. For this event, each National Olympic Committee (NOC) was permitted to enter up to three athletes, provided they had run below 10.21 seconds during this period in IAAF-sanctioned meetings or tournaments. If a NOC had no athletes qualified under this standard, it could enter up to one athlete that had run below 10.28 seconds.

== Competition format ==
The event retained the same basic four round format introduced in 1920: heats, quarterfinals, semifinals, and a final. The "fastest loser" system, introduced in 1968, was used again to ensure that the quarterfinals and subsequent rounds had exactly 8 runners per heat; this time, the system was used in both the heats and quarterfinals.

The first round consisted of 10 heats, each with 8 or 9 athletes. The top three runners in each heat advanced, along with the next ten fastest runners overall. This made 40 quarterfinalists, who were divided into 5 heats of 8 runners. The top three runners in each quarterfinal advanced, with one "fastest loser" place. The 16 semifinalists competed in two heats of 8, with the top four in each semifinal advancing to the eight-man final.

== Records ==
Prior to the competition, the existing world record, Olympic record, and world leading time were as follows:

World record	Maurice Greene (USA)	9.79 s	Athens, Greece	16 June 1999
Olympic record	Donovan Bailey (CAN)	9.84 s	Atlanta, United States	27 July 1996
World Leading	Shawn Crawford (USA)	9.88 s	Eugene, Oregon, United States	19 June 2004

No new records were set during the competition.

== Schedule ==
All times are Eastern European Summer Time (UTC+3)

Date	Time	Round
Saturday, 21 August 2004	10:35; 19:40	Round 1 Round 2
Sunday, 22 August 2004	20:55; 23:10	Semifinals; Final

== Results ==
=== Round 1 ===
Qualification rule: The first three finishers in each heat (Q) plus the ten fastest times of those who finished fourth or lower in their heat (q) qualified.

==== Heat 1 ====
Rank	Lane	Athlete	Nation	Reaction	Time	Notes
1	5	Frankie Fredericks	Namibia	0.152	10.12	Q, SB
2	3	Uchenna Emedolu	Nigeria	0.222	10.22	Q
3	4	Shingo Suetsugu	Japan	0.174	10.27	Q
4	7	Darren Campbell	Great Britain	0.159	10.35	
5	9	Chen Haijian	China	0.181	10.45	
6	2	Eric Nkansah	Ghana	0.160	10.54	
7	6	Poh Seng Song	Singapore	0.160	10.75	
8	8	Yazaldes Nascimento	São Tomé and Príncipe	0.185	11.00	
				Wind: −0.2 m/s		

==== Heat 2 ====
Rank	Lane	Athlete	Nation	Reaction	Time	Notes
1	5	Mark Lewis-Francis	Great Britain	0.149	10.13	Q, SB
2	7	Aziz Zakari	Ghana	0.188	10.19	Q
3	6	Roland Németh	Hungary	0.137	10.28	Q
4	3	Salem Mubarak Al Yami	Saudi Arabia	0.143	10.36	
5	4	Darren Gilford	Malta	0.177	10.67	
6	8	Khalil Al Hanahneh	Jordan	0.172	10.76	
7	2	Kakianako Nariki	Kiribati	0.183	11.62	
—	9	Marc Burns	Trinidad and Tobago		DSQ	R 162.7
				Wind: −0.4 m/s		

==== Heat 3 ====
Rank	Lane	Athlete	Nation	Reaction	Time	Notes
1	8	Justin Gatlin	United States	0.204	10.07	Q
2	6	Kareem Streete-Thompson	Cayman Islands	0.156	10.15	Q, SB
3	9	Leonard Myles-Mills	Ghana	0.133	10.21	Q, SB
4	4	Vicente de Lima	Brazil	0.169	10.23	q
5	1	Andrey Yepishin	Russia	0.146	10.29	q
6	2	Georgios Theodoridis	Greece	0.141	10.32	q
7	5	Hadhari Djaffar	Comoros	0.163	10.62	
8	7	Sultan Saeed	Maldives	0.239	11.72	
—	3	Juan Sainfleur	Dominican Republic	0.164	DNF	
				Wind: −0.1 m/s		

==== Heat 4 ====
Rank	Lane	Athlete	Nation	Reaction	Time	Notes
1	6	Shawn Crawford	United States	0.184	10.02	Q
2	1	Obadele Thompson	Barbados	0.141	10.08	Q, SB
3	4	Matic Osovnikar	Slovenia	0.112	10.15	Q, NR
4	5	Idrissa Sanou	Burkina Faso	0.175	10.33	q
5	3	Diego Ferreira	Paraguay	0.141	10.50	NR
6	9	Pierre de Windt	Aruba	0.234	11.02	
7	7	Chamleunesouk Ao Oudomphonh	Laos	0.202	11.30	
8	8	Masoud Azizi	Afghanistan	0.217	11.66	
—	2	Hristoforos Hoidis	Greece		DNS	
				Wind: +0.8 m/s		

==== Heat 5 ====
Rank	Lane	Athlete	Nation	Reaction	Time	Notes
1	2	Francis Obikwelu	Portugal	0.165	10.09	Q
2	5	Ronald Pognon	France	0.150	10.18	Q
3	3	Jaysuma Saidy Ndure	The Gambia	0.157	10.26	Q, NR
4	8	Jarbas Mascarenhas	Brazil	0.147	10.34	q
5	7	Hiroyasu Tsuchie	Japan	0.182	10.37	
6	9	Adrian Durant	Virgin Islands	0.223	10.52	
7	6	Nabie Foday Fofanah	Guinea	0.158	10.62	
8	4	Harmon Harmon	Cook Islands	0.173	11.22	PB
				Wind: +0.1 m/s		

==== Heat 6 ====
Rank	Lane	Athlete	Nation	Reaction	Time	Notes
1	7	Nobuharu Asahara	Japan	0.162	10.33	Q
2	3	Łukasz Chyła	Poland	0.167	10.35	Q
3	4	Eric Pacome N'Dri	Ivory Coast	0.147	10.39	Q
4	9	Ato Boldon	Trinidad and Tobago	0.155	10.41	
5	6	Issa Aime Nthepe	France	0.159	10.67	
6	2	Gábor Dobos	Hungary	0.131	10.68	
7	8	John Howard	Federated States of Micronesia	0.195	10.85	NR
8	5	Mohammad Shamsuddin	Bangladesh	0.173	11.13	
				Wind: −1.1 m/s		

==== Heat 7 ====
Rank	Lane	Athlete	Nation	Reaction	Time	Notes
1	9	Asafa Powell	Jamaica	0.146	10.06	Q
2	5	Jason Gardener	Great Britain	0.155	10.15	Q, SB
3	4	Joshua Ross	Australia	0.153	10.24	Q, =PB
4	1	André da Silva	Brazil	0.145	10.28	q
5	8	Pierre Browne	Canada	0.169	10.32	q
6	7	Lamin Tucker	Sierra Leone	0.137	10.72	
7	6	Kelsey Nakanelua	American Samoa	0.160	11.25	
8	2	Sopheak Phouk	Cambodia	0.225	11.56	PB
—	3	Djikoloum Mobele	Chad		DNS	
				Wind: +0.9 m/s		

==== Heat 8 ====
Rank	Lane	Athlete	Nation	Reaction	Time	Notes
1	1	Maurice Greene	United States	0.142	10.18	Q
2	2	Dwight Thomas	Jamaica	0.135	10.21	Q
3	8	Churandy Martina	Netherlands Antilles	0.152	10.23	Q
4	3	Alexander Kosenkow	Germany	0.135	10.28	q
5	6	Prodromos Katsantonis	Cyprus	0.179	10.50	SB
6	7	Chiang Wai Hung	Hong Kong	0.157	10.70	
7	9	Francis Manioru	Solomon Islands	0.143	11.05	
8	5	Teymur Gasimov	Azerbaijan	0.179	11.17	
9	4	Filipo Muller	Tonga	0.181	11.18	PB
				Wind: −0.2 m/s		

==== Heat 9 ====
Rank	Lane	Athlete	Nation	Reaction	Time	Notes
1	9	Deji Aliu	Nigeria	0.191	10.39	Q
2	2	Nicolas Macrozonaris	Canada	0.153	10.40	Q
3	6	Gennadiy Chernovol	Kazakhstan	0.145	10.43	Q
4	3	Souhalia Alamou	Benin	0.167	10.48	
5	8	Christie van Wyk	Namibia	0.148	10.49	
6	4	Daniel Bailey	Antigua and Barbuda	0.154	10.51	
7	7	Gian Nicola Berardi	San Marino	0.143	10.76	
8	5	Carlos Abaunza	Nicaragua	0.173	11.17	
				Wind: −1.4 m/s		

==== Heat 10 ====
Rank	Lane	Athlete	Nation	Reaction	Time	Notes
1	6	Kim Collins	Saint Kitts and Nevis	0.154	10.11	Q
2	3	Michael Frater	Jamaica	0.161	10.20	Q
3	4	Nicconnor Alexander	Trinidad and Tobago	0.139	10.22	Q
4	7	Simone Collio	Italy	0.151	10.27	q
5	2	Eddy de Lepine	France	0.192	10.27	q
6	8	Xavier James	Bermuda	0.147	10.40	SB
7	9	Sebastien Gattuso	Monaco	0.152	10.58	=NR
8	5	Wilfried Bingangoye	Gabon	0.206	10.76	PB
				Wind: +0.7 m/s		

=== Quarterfinals ===
Qualification rule: The first three finishers in each heat (Q) plus the next fastest overall sprinter (q) qualified.

==== Quarterfinal 1 ====
Rank	Lane	Athlete	Nation	Reaction	Time	Notes
1	4	Francis Obikwelu	Portugal	0.165	9.93	Q, NR
2	5	Mark Lewis-Francis	Great Britain	0.162	10.12	Q, =PB
3	3	Dwight Thomas	Jamaica	0.149	10.12	Q, SB
4	6	Ronald Pognon	France	0.166	10.15	q
5	8	Shingo Suetsugu	Japan	0.150	10.19	
6	2	Pierre Browne	Canada	0.150	10.21	
7	7	Churandy Martina	Netherlands Antilles	0.152	10.24	
8	1	André da Silva	Brazil	0.136	10.34	
				Wind: 0.0 m/s		

==== Quarterfinal 2 ====
Rank	Lane	Athlete	Nation	Reaction	Time	Notes
1	4	Shawn Crawford	United States	0.167	9.89	Q
2	3	Obadele Thompson	Barbados	0.156	10.12	Q
3	7	Vicente de Lima	Brazil	0.158	10.26	Q
4	2	Matic Osovnikar	Slovenia	0.168	10.26	
5	6	Deji Aliu	Nigeria	0.185	10.26	
6	5	Nicolas Macrozonaris	Canada	0.161	10.28	
7	1	Gennadiy Chernovol	Kazakhstan	0.154	10.42	
8	8	Idrissa Sanou	Burkina Faso	0.178	10.43	
				Wind: 0.0 m/s		

==== Quarterfinal 3 ====
Rank	Lane	Athlete	Nation	Reaction	Time	Notes
1	4	Justin Gatlin	United States	0.178	9.96	Q
2	3	Jason Gardener	Great Britain	0.146	10.15	Q, =SB
3	5	Uchenna Emedolu	Nigeria	0.162	10.15	Q
4	6	Nobuharu Asahara	Japan	0.151	10.24	
5	2	Georgios Theodoridis	Greece	0.141	10.36	
6	7	Roland Németh	Hungary	0.151	10.38	
7	8	Nicconnor Alexander	Trinidad and Tobago	0.148	10.48	
—	1	Eddy de Lepine	France		DNS	
				Wind: +0.2 m/s		

==== Quarterfinal 4 ====
Rank	Lane	Athlete	Nation	Reaction	Time	Notes
1	4	Aziz Zakari	Ghana	0.175	10.02	Q
2	6	Kim Collins	Saint Kitts and Nevis	0.152	10.05	Q, SB
3	5	Michael Frater	Jamaica	0.152	10.11	Q
4	3	Frankie Fredericks	Namibia	0.142	10.17	
5	7	Joshua Ross	Australia	0.163	10.22	PB
6	1	Alexander Kosenkow	Germany	0.113	10.24	
7	2	Andrey Yepishin	Russia	0.164	10.29	
8	8	Jaysuma Saidy Ndure	The Gambia	0.184	10.39	
				Wind: −0.1 m/s		

==== Quarterfinal 5 ====
Rank	Lane	Athlete	Nation	Reaction	Time	Notes
1	4	Maurice Greene	United States	0.117	9.93	Q
2	6	Asafa Powell	Jamaica	0.142	9.99	Q
3	1	Leonard Myles-Mills	Ghana	0.145	10.18	Q, SB
4	5	Łukasz Chyła	Poland	0.167	10.23	
5	3	Kareem Streete-Thompson	Cayman Islands	0.162	10.24	
6	8	Simone Collio	Italy	0.135	10.29	
7	2	Jarbas Mascarenhas	Brazil	0.134	10.30	
8	7	Eric Pacome N'Dri	Ivory Coast	0.137	10.32	
				Wind: −0.2 m/s		

=== Semifinals ===
Qualification rule: The first four runners in each semifinal heat (Q) moves on to the final.

==== Semifinal 1 ====
Rank	Lane	Athlete	Nation	Reaction	Time	Notes
1	3	Shawn Crawford	United States	0.173	10.07	Q
2	4	Justin Gatlin	United States	0.191	10.09	Q
3	6	Aziz Zakari	Ghana	0.155	10.11	Q
4	8	Obadele Thompson	Barbados	0.160	10.22	Q
5	5	Mark Lewis-Francis	Great Britain	0.163	10.28	
6	2	Michael Frater	Jamaica	0.146	10.29	
7	1	Ronald Pognon	France	0.144	10.32	
8	7	Uchenna Emedolu	Nigeria	0.188	10.35	
				Wind: −1.6 m/s		

==== Semifinal 2 ====
Rank	Lane	Athlete	Nation	Reaction	Time	Notes
1	4	Asafa Powell	Jamaica	0.158	9.95	Q
2	5	Francis Obikwelu	Portugal	0.181	9.97	Q
3	6	Maurice Greene	United States	0.125	9.97	Q
4	3	Kim Collins	Saint Kitts and Nevis	0.150	10.02	Q, SB
5	8	Jason Gardener	Great Britain	0.147	10.12	SB
6	1	Leonard Myles-Mills	Ghana	0.139	10.22	
7	7	Dwight Thomas	Jamaica	0.156	10.28	
8	2	Vicente de Lima	Brazil	0.163	10.28	
				Wind: +0.2 m/s		

=== Final ===
In the final, the slowest to react was Justin Gatlin, still with the most powerful first steps, Gatlin led from the gun, with Kim Collins, the next slowest to react, also getting a typically fast start (typically in lane 1). A step behind, back from injuries, defending champion Maurice Greene, was fastest to react but running sideways in quicksand. He was joined by Francis Obikwelu and Shawn Crawford, who had a slight edge on the other competitors in the center of the track. Collins faded as Obikwelu, Crawford and Greene gained. Feeling his lead disappearing rapidly, Gatlin leaned early still maintaining the lead across the line. The tall Obikwelu perfectly timed his dip to clearly grab silver. Crawford's finish occurred two meters too late giving Greene another medal with the same time as his win four years earlier.

Rank	Lane	Athlete	Nation	Reaction	Time	Notes
1st place, gold medalist(s)	3	Justin Gatlin	United States	0.188	9.85	WL, PB
2nd place, silver medalist(s)	5	Francis Obikwelu	Portugal	0.163	9.86	AR
3rd place, bronze medalist(s)	7	Maurice Greene	United States	0.151	9.87	SB
4	4	Shawn Crawford	United States	0.161	9.89	PB
5	6	Asafa Powell	Jamaica	0.166	9.94	
6	1	Kim Collins	Saint Kitts and Nevis	0.175	10.00	SB
7	8	Obadele Thompson	Barbados	0.164	10.10	
—	2	Aziz Zakari	Ghana	0.178	DNF	
				Wind: +0.6 m/s		
