= 2005 World Championships in Athletics – Men's 100 metres =

Men's 100 metres at the 2005 World Championships
- Venue: Helsinki Olympic Stadium
- Dates: 6 August (heats and quarter-finals); 7 August (semi-finals and final)
- Competitors: 58
- Winning time: 9.88

Medalists
gold medal	Justin Gatlin	United States
silver medal	Michael Frater	Jamaica
bronze medal	Kim Collins	Saint Kitts and Nevis

The men's 100 metres at the 2005 World Championships in Athletics was held at the Helsinki Olympic Stadium on August 6 and August 7. The winning margin was 0.17 seconds which as of 2024 is the greatest winning margin for the men's 100 metres at these championships.

The top three runners in each of the initial eight heats automatically qualified for the second round. The next ten fastest runners from across the heats also qualified. Those 32 runners competed in four heats in the second round, with the top three runners from each heat and the single next fastest runner qualifying for the semifinals. There were two semifinal heats, and only the top four from each heat advanced to the final.

== Records ==
Before the competition records were as follows:

Record	Athlete & Nat.	Perf.	Location	Date
World record	Asafa Powell (JAM)	9.77	Athens, Greece	14 June 2005
Championship record	Maurice Greene (USA)	9.80	Seville, Spain	22 August 1999
World Leading	Asafa Powell (JAM)	9.77	Athens, Greece	14 June 2005
African Record	Frankie Fredericks (NAM)	9.86	Lausanne, Switzerland	3 July 1996
Asian Record	Koji Ito (JPN)	10.00	Bangkok, Thailand	13 December 1998
North, Central American and Caribbean record	Asafa Powell (JAM)	9.77	Athens, Greece	14 June 2005
South American Record	Robson da Silva (BRA)	10.00	Mexico City, Mexico	22 July 1988
European Record	Francis Obikwelu (POR)	9.86	Athens, Greece	22 August 2004
Oceanian record	Patrick Johnson (AUS)	9.93	Mito, Japan	5 May 2003

== Medals ==
Gold	Silver	Bronze
Justin Gatlin; United States	Michael Frater; Jamaica	Kim Collins; Saint Kitts and Nevis

== Results ==
All times shown are in seconds.
Q denotes qualification by place.
q denotes qualification by time.
DNS denotes did not start.
DNF denotes did not finish.
AR denotes area record
NR denotes national record.
PB denotes personal best.
SB denotes season's best.

=== Round 1 (Heats) ===
Round 1 took place on 6 August, with the 62 athletes involved being split into 8 heats of 7 or 8 athletes each. The first 3 athletes in each heat ( Q ) and the next 8 fastest ( q ) qualified for the quarter-final.

Wind:
Heat 1: +0.6 m/s, Heat 2: +0.9 m/s, Heat 3: +0.9 m/s, Heat 4: +0.4 m/s, Heat 5: 0.0 m/s, Heat 6: +0.4 m/s, Heat 7: +0.3 m/s, Heat 8: −1.4 m/s

Rank	Heat	Name	Nationality	Time	Notes
1	5	Leonard Scott	United States	10.12	Q
2	2	Ronald Pognon	France	10.15	Q
2	3	Dwight Thomas	Jamaica	10.15	Q
4	2	Ainsley Waugh	Jamaica	10.16	Q, PB
4	4	Justin Gatlin	United States	10.16	Q
6	1	Francis Obikwelu	Portugal	10.17	Q
6	5	Uchenna Emedolu	Nigeria	10.17	Q
8	2	Olusoji Fasuba	Nigeria	10.19	Q
8	8	Jason Gardener	Great Britain & N.I.	10.19	Q
10	3	Patrick Johnson	Australia	10.20	Q, SB
11	1	Shawn Crawford	United States	10.23	Q
12	3	Darrel Brown	Trinidad and Tobago	10.25	Q
12	6	Marlon Devonish	Great Britain & N.I.	10.25	Q
14	1	Simone Collio	Italy	10.27	Q
15	4	Joshua Ross	Australia	10.28	Q
16	8	Aziz Zakari	Ghana	10.30	Q
17	5	Jacey Harper	Trinidad and Tobago	10.31	Q
17	7	Kim Collins	Saint Kitts and Nevis	10.31	Q
17	2	Guus Hoogmoed	Netherlands	10.31	q
20	7	Michael Frater	Jamaica	10.32	Q
20	5	Obadele Thompson	Barbados	10.32	q
22	8	Deji Aliu	Nigeria	10.36	Q
23	2	Lukasz Chyla	Poland	10.39	q
24	4	Nobuharu Asahara	Japan	10.40	Q
24	1	Nicolas Macrozonaris	Canada	10.40	q, SB
24	3	Matic Osovnikar	Slovenia	10.40	q
24	4	Mark Lewis-Francis	Great Britain & N.I.	10.40	q
28	6	Marc Burns	Trinidad and Tobago	10.42	Q
29	7	Idrissa Sanou	Burkina Faso	10.43	Q
30	7	Salem Mubarak Al-Yami	Saudi Arabia	10.45	q
31	6	Churandy Martina	Netherlands Antilles	10.46	Q
32	7	Juan Sainfleur	Dominican Republic	10.47	q
33	3	Markus Pöyhönen	Finland	10.49	
33	8	Daniel Bailey	Antigua and Barbuda	10.49	
35	5	Pierre Browne	Canada	10.50	
36	4	Leigh Julius	South Africa	10.51	
37	8	Cláudio Roberto Souza	Brazil	10.55	
38	6	Tlhalosang Molapisi	Botswana	10.71	
39	7	Rolando Palacios	Honduras	10.73	NR
40	1	Philam Garcia	Guam	10.79	
41	2	Shameer Ayub	Singapore	10.82	SB
42	7	Wilfried Bingangoye	Gabon	10.86	SB
43	7	Darren Gilford	Malta	10.89	
44	3	Souhalia Alamou	Benin	10.90	SB
45	3	Wally Kirika	Papua New Guinea	11.01	
45	8	Fonseca Neto	Angola	11.01	PB
47	6	Yazaldes Nascimento	São Tomé and Príncipe	11.07	SB
48	2	Chi Kun Au	Macau	11.11	
49	6	John Howard	Federated States of Micronesia	11.24	SB
50	6	Ali Shareef	Maldives	11.44	
51	4	Darrel Roligat	Northern Mariana Islands	11.49	
52	1	Derrick Atkins	Bahamas	11.57	
52	8	Reginaldo Micha Ndong	Equatorial Guinea	11.57	
54	5	Deamo Baguga	Nauru	11.64	PB
55	5	Phomma Kheuabmavong	Laos	11.83	
56	1	Harmon Harmon	Cook Islands	11.84	SB
57	4	Daraphirit	Cambodia	11.85	
58	1	Mariuti Uan	Kiribati	11.92	PB
	6	Eric Pacome N'dri	Ivory Coast	DNF	
	2	Khalid Brooks	Anguilla	DNS	
	3	Domeio Kabua	Marshall Islands	DNS	
	8	Christie van Wyk	Namibia	DNS	

=== Round 2 (Quarter-Finals) ===
Round 2 took place on 6 August, with the 32 athletes involved being split into 4 heats of 8 athletes each. The first 3 athletes in each heat ( Q ) and the next 4 fastest ( q ) qualified for the semi-final.

Wind:
Heat 1: −2.0 m/s, Heat 2: −1.2 m/s, Heat 3: +0.7 m/s, Heat 4: −1.0 m/s

Rank	Heat	Name	Nationality	Time	Notes
1	4	Darrel Brown	Trinidad and Tobago	10.10	Q
2	4	Ronald Pognon	France	10.11	Q
3	4	Michael Frater	Jamaica	10.12	Q
4	4	Uchenna Emedolu	Nigeria	10.16	q
5	2	Leonard Scott	United States	10.19	Q
5	3	Francis Obikwelu	Portugal	10.19	Q
7	4	Marlon Devonish	Great Britain & N.I.	10.20	q
8	2	Olusoji Fasuba	Nigeria	10.24	Q
9	3	Shawn Crawford	United States	10.25	Q
10	1	Justin Gatlin	United States	10.27	Q
11	1	Dwight Thomas	United States	10.28	Q
12	2	Marc Burns	Trinidad and Tobago	10.29	Q
13	3	Jason Gardener	Great Britain & N.I.	10.31	Q
13	3	Joshua Ross	Australia	10.31	q
15	2	Kim Collins	Saint Kitts and Nevis	10.32	q
16	4	Obadele Thompson	Barbados	10.34	
17	2	Ainsley Waugh	Jamaica	10.39	
17	3	Deji Aliu	Nigeria	10.39	
17	3	Jacey Harper	Trinidad and Tobago	10.39	
20	1	Aziz Zakari	Ghana	10.41	Q
21	1	Patrick Johnson	Australia	10.48	
21	2	Churandy Martina	Netherlands Antilles	10.48	
21	3	Nicolas Macrozonaris	Canada	10.48	
21	3	Matic Osovnikar	Slovenia	10.48	
21	4	Salem Mubarak Al-Yami	Saudi Arabia	10.48	
26	2	Guus Hoogmoed	Netherlands	10.51	
27	1	Mark Lewis-Francis	Great Britain & N.I.	10.53	
28	1	Nobuharu Asahara	Japan	10.58	
29	1	Simone Collio	Italy	10.60	
30	2	Juan Sainfleur	Dominican Republic	10.74	
31	4	Idrissa Sanou	Burkina Faso	10.80	
	1	Lukasz Chyla	Poland	DNS	

=== Semifinals ===
The semifinals took place on 7 August, with the 16 athletes involved being split into 2 heats of 8 athletes each. The first 4 athletes in each heat ( Q ) qualified for the final.

Wind:
Heat 1: +0.5 m/s, Heat 2: −1.0 m/s

Rank	Heat	Name	Nationality	Time	Notes
1	2	Justin Gatlin	United States	9.99	Q
2	2	Aziz Zakari	Ghana	10.00	Q
3	2	Dwight Thomas	Jamaica	10.06	Q
4	2	Kim Collins	Saint Kitts and Nevis	10.07	Q
5	1	Leonard Scott	United States	10.08	Q
5	2	Jason Gardener	Great Britain & N.I.	10.08	SB
7	1	Michael Frater	Jamaica	10.09	Q
8	1	Marc Burns	Trinidad and Tobago	10.12	Q
9	1	Francis Obikwelu	Portugal	10.13	Q
10	2	Darrel Brown	Trinidad and Tobago	10.16	
10	2	Uchenna Emedolu	Nigeria	10.16	
12	2	Ronald Pognon	France	10.17	
13	1	Olusoji Fasuba	Nigeria	10.18	
14	1	Marlon Devonish	Great Britain & N.I.	10.24	
15	1	Joshua Ross	Australia	10.27	
16	1	Shawn Crawford	United States	10.28	

=== Final ===
The final started at 21:35 on 7 August.

Wind: +0.4 m/s

Rank	Lane	Name	Nationality	Time	Notes
1st place, gold medalist(s)	5	Justin Gatlin	United States	9.88	=SB
2nd place, silver medalist(s)	4	Michael Frater	Jamaica	10.05	
3rd place, bronze medalist(s)	2	Kim Collins	Saint Kitts and Nevis	10.05	
4	8	Francis Obikwelu	Portugal	10.07	
5	7	Dwight Thomas	Jamaica	10.09	
6	3	Leonard Scott	United States	10.13	
7	1	Marc Burns	Trinidad and Tobago	10.14	
8	6	Aziz Zakari	Ghana	10.20	
