= Athletics at the 2007 All-Africa Games – Men's 100 metres =

The men's 100 metres at the 2007 All-Africa Games were held on July 18–19.

== Medalists ==
Gold	Silver	Bronze
Olusoji Fasuba; Nigeria	Eric Nkansah; Ghana	Uchenna Emedolu; Nigeria

== Results ==
=== Heats ===
Qualification: First 3 of each heat (Q) and the next 6 fastest (q) qualified for the semifinals.

Wind:
Heat 1: +0.7 m/s, Heat 2: 0.0 m/s, Heat 3: −1.1 m/s, Heat 4: −0.9 m/s, Heat 5: 0.0 m/s, Heat 6: −0.4 m/s

Rank	Heat	Name	Nationality	Time	Notes
1	1	Tom Musinde	Kenya	10.26	Q, NR
2	6	Uchenna Emedolu	Nigeria	10.37	Q
3	1	Beranger Bosse	Central African Republic	10.40	Q
3	2	Idrissa Sanou	Burkina Faso	10.40	Q
3	3	Isaac Uche	Nigeria	10.40	Q
6	4	Snyman Prinsloo	South Africa	10.41	Q
7	2	Christiaan Krone	South Africa	10.43	Q
7	3	Harry Adu-Mfum	Ghana	10.43	Q, SB
9	2	Gabriel Mvumvure	Zimbabwe	10.45	Q, NJR
9	3	Brian Dzingai	Zimbabwe	10.45	Q
9	5	Olusoji Fasuba	Nigeria	10.45	Q
12	5	Gibrilla Patu Bangura	Sierra Leone	10.48	Q
13	3	Ben Youssef Meité	Ivory Coast	10.49	q, SB
13	5	Eric Nkansah	Ghana	10.49	Q
15	5	Marius Loua Siapade	Ivory Coast	10.50	q
15	6	Éric Pacôme N'Dri	Ivory Coast	10.50	Q
17	3	Sherwin Vries	South Africa	10.51	q
18	1	Ngonidzashe Makusha	Zimbabwe	10.52	Q, PB
18	3	Amr Ibrahim Mostafa Seoud	Egypt	10.52	q
20	2	Suwaibou Sanneh	Gambia	10.53	q, PB
20	5	Wilfried Bingangoye	Gabon	10.53	q
22	1	Samuel Kenosi	Botswana	10.58	NJR
23	2	Mouhamadou Niang	Senegal	10.59	
24	4	Katim Touré	Senegal	10.65	Q, SB
25	5	Hitjivirue Kaanjuka	Namibia	10.67	
26	5	Holder da Silva	Guinea-Bissau	10.67	NJR
27	6	Justin Saeed Duah	Ghana	10.68	PB
28	4	Wetere Galcha	Ethiopia	10.70	Q, SB
28	6	Tlhalosang Molapisi	Botswana	10.70	SB
28	6	Thierry Adanabou	Burkina Faso	10.70	SB
31	4	Moussa Sissoko	Mali	10.72	SB
32	3	Tidiane Coulibaly	Mali	10.75	=PB
33	1	Alassane Diallo	Senegal	10.76	PB
33	4	Youssouf Mahdjoub	Comoros	10.76	NJR
35	1	Modou Njie	Gambia	10.88	PB
36	6	Roberts Kokurlo	Liberia	10.98	NJR
37	5	Anthony Weah	Liberia	11.10	PB
38	2	Almany Bangoura	Guinea	11.12	PB
38	4	Ramadhini Ngaruko	Burundi	11.12	PB
40	4	Matuco Nzovo	Angola	11.17	
41	3	Dabo Domingos	Guinea-Bissau	11.21	
42	1	Ibrahim Niankara	Burkina Faso	11.25	
43	5	Mohamed Konate	Mauritania	11.26	
44	6	Islam Mulinda	Rwanda	11.35	
45	2	Mounir Mahadi	Chad	11.36	
46	2	Moamed Ismail Mamun	Eritrea	11.45	
47	3	Reginaldo Micha	Equatorial Guinea	11.53	
48	1	Haita Bonyafala	Democratic Republic of the Congo	11.94	
49	4	Stephen Odwar	Uganda	12.02	
	6	Roger Angouono Moke	Republic of the Congo	DNS	

=== Semifinals ===
Qualification: First 2 of each semifinal (Q) and the next 2 fastest (q) qualified for the final.

Wind:
Heat 1: 0.0 m/s, Heat 2: 0.0 m/s, Heat 3: -0.4 m/s

Rank	Heat	Name	Nationality	Time	Notes
1	2	Olusoji Fasuba	Nigeria	10.31	Q
2	1	Isaac Uche	Nigeria	10.32	Q, PB
3	1	Éric Pacôme N'Dri	Ivory Coast	10.36	Q, SB
4	1	Eric Nkansah	Ghana	10.37	q
5	2	Snyman Prinsloo	South Africa	10.41	Q
6	3	Uchenna Emedolu	Nigeria	10.42	Q
7	2	Idrissa Sanou	Burkina Faso	10.43	q
8	1	Gibrilla Patu Bangura	Sierra Leone	10.44	
9	3	Harry Adu-Mfum	Ghana	10.45	Q
10	1	Sherwin Vries	South Africa	10.46	
11	1	Tom Musinde	Kenya	10.47	
12	1	Gabriel Mvumvure	Zimbabwe	10.50	
13	2	Ben Youssef Meité	Ivory Coast	10.52	
13	3	Amr Ibrahim Mostafa Seoud	Egypt	10.52	
15	3	Brian Dzingai	Zimbabwe	10.54	
16	2	Ngonidzashe Makusha	Zimbabwe	10.56	
16	3	Béranger Bosse	Central African Republic	10.56	
18	1	Wilfried Bingangoye	Gabon	10.58	
19	3	Marius Loua Siapade	Ivory Coast	10.63	
20	3	Suwaibou Sanneh	Gambia	10.70	
21	2	Katim Touré	Senegal	10.80	
22	2	Wetere Galcha	Ethiopia	10.88	
	2	Justin Saeed Duah	Ghana	DNS	
	3	Christiaan Krone	South Africa	DNS	

=== Final ===
Wind: +0.6 m/s

Rank	Name	Nationality	Time	Notes
1st place, gold medalist(s)	Olusoji Fasuba	Nigeria	10.18	
2nd place, silver medalist(s)	Eric Nkansah	Ghana	10.35	
3rd place, bronze medalist(s)	Uchenna Emedolu	Nigeria	10.37	
4	Idrissa Sanou	Burkina Faso	10.39	SB
5	Snyman Prinsloo	South Africa	10.39	
6	Éric Pacôme N'Dri	Ivory Coast	10.46	
7	Isaac Uche	Nigeria	10.53	
8	Harry Adu-Mfum	Ghana	10.58	
