= 2002 African Championships in Athletics – Men's 4 × 100 metres relay =

The men's 4 × 100 metres relay event at the 2002 African Championships in Athletics was held in Radès, Tunisia on August 8.

== Results ==
Rank	Nation	Competitors	Time	Notes
1st place, gold medalist(s)	Nigeria	Taiwo Ajibade, Chinedu Oriala, Sunday Emmanuel, Uchenna Emedolu	39.76	
2nd place, silver medalist(s)	Senegal	Malang Sané, Abdou Demba Lam, Jacques Sambou, Oumar Loum	40.08	
3rd place, bronze medalist(s)	Mauritius	David Victoire, Fernando Augustin, Arnaud Casquette, Eric Milazar	40.27	
4	Liberia	Kouty Mawenh, Abraham Morlu, Joseph Brent, Sayon Cooper	40.57	
5	Benin	Ramane Vady, Narcisse Tevoedjre, Arcadius Fanou, Souhalia Alamou	40.99	
6	Libya	Fawzi Abdulsalam, Abubaker El Tawerghi, Ali Mohamed, Zouheir Raseb	42.58	
	Ivory Coast	Marius Loua, Ibrahim Meité, Souleymane Meité, Yves Sonan	DQ	
