= Athletics at the 2005 Jeux de la Francophonie =

Athletics at the V Francophonie Games
- Dates: 11–16 December
- Host city: Niamey, Niger
- Venue: Stade Général Seyni Kountché
- Events: 43
- Participation: 362 athletes from 36 nations
- Records set: 2 Games records

At the 2005 Jeux de la Francophonie, the athletics events were held at the Stade Général Seyni Kountché in Niamey, Niger, from 11–16 December 2005. A total of 43 events were contested, of which 23 by male and 20 by female athletes. France sent the largest squad and topped the medal table with 19 gold medals and 39 medals in total. Morocco was the next most successful nation, having won 11 golds and 31 medals altogether. This was large as a result of their middle- and long-distance running dominance which saw them take all three medals in four events, as well as three separate Moroccan 1–2 finishes. Canada and the Ivory Coast were third and fourth in the medal tally. Twenty of the 37 nations competing won a medal, although hosts Niger went empty-handed in the athletics competition.

The performances were down in comparison to the 2001 edition in Ottawa, which had benefited from being held a few weeks before the 2001 World Championships in Athletics, also in Canada that year. Two Games records were broken over the course of the competition, but a number of African athletes broke their national record – home athletes improved six different Nigerien records.

Among the prominent medallists were Moroccans Yassine Bensghir and Seltana Aït Hammou, who completed 800/1500 metres doubles on the men's and women's sides respectively. Their compatriot Zhor El Kamch won both the women's 5000 metres and 10,000 metres while Tarik Bougtaïb took a gold and a silver in the horizontal jumps. Yves Niaré of France was dominant in the throws, winning the shot put and discus throw events. Chad's efforts were led by Kaltouma Nadjina who won two golds for her 200 metres and 400 metres performances – her nation's only medals of the entire multi-sport event that year.

== Records ==
Name	Event	Country	Record	Type
Rachid Kisri	Men's marathon	Morocco	2:17:03	GR
Zhor El Kamch	Women's 10,000 metres	Morocco	33:41.28	GR
Key:WR — World record • AR — Area record • GR — Games record • NR — National record

== Medal summary ==
=== Men ===
Event	Gold		Silver		Bronze	
100 metres	Idrissa Sanou (BUR)	10.48	Éric Pacôme N'Dri (CIV)	10.52	Amr Ibrahim Mostafa Seoud (EGY)	10.55
200 metres	Ben Youssef Meité (CIV)	20.99	Marius Loua (CIV)	21.01	Oumar Loum (SEN)	21.12
400 metres	Mathieu Gnanligo (BEN)	46.43	Fernando Augustin (MRI)	46.52	Ismael Daif (MAR)	47.13
800 metres	Yassine Bensghir (MAR)	1:47.11	Assane Diallo (SEN)	1:49.10	Abdelkrim Khoudri (MAR)	1:49.52
1500 metres	Yassine Bensghir (MAR)	3:46.58	Youssef Baba (MAR)	3:46.84	Zakaria Mazouzi (MAR)	3:47.84
5000 metres	Adil Kaouch (MAR)	14:16.23	Abdelhalim Zahraoui (MAR)	14:16.39	Dieudonné Disi (RWA)	14:16.41
10,000 metres	Dieudonné Disi (RWA)	29:17.11	Abderrahim Goumri (MAR)	29:18.05	Ahmed Baday (MAR)	29:18.06
110 metres hurdles	Cédric Lavanne (FRA)	13.68	Jared MacLeod (CAN)	13.70	Joseph-Berlioz Randriamihaja (MAD)	14.08
400 metres hurdles	Ibou Faye (SEN)	50.67	Ibrahima Maïga (MLI)	50.71	Barnabé Bationo (BUR)	51.04
3000 metres steeplechase	Hamid Ezzine (MAR)	8:52.73	Abderrahman Mouatassim (MAR)	9:01.03	Nordine Gezzar (FRA)	9:08.33
4×100 metres relay	Ivory Coast (CIV); Jean-Ukruch Kouassi Tiecura; Marius Loua; Ben Youssef Meité; Éric Pacôme N'Dri	39.79	France (FRA); Yannick Urbino; Thierry Lubin; Christophe Cheval; Jérôme Éyana	40.09	Mauritius (MRI); Arnaud Casquette; Fernando Augustin; Henrico Louis; Ommana Kowlessur	40.28
4×400 metres relay	Morocco (MAR); Younes Frhani; Abdelkrim Khoudri; Younés Belkaifa; Ismael Daif	3:06.87	Mauritius (MRI); Jean-Francois Degrasse; Ommana Kowlessur; Anton Vieillesse; Fernando Augustin	3:07.46	Senegal (SEN); El Hadji Sethe Mbow; Jacques Sambou; Ibou Faye; Cheikh Drame	3:11.37
Marathon	Rachid Kisri (MAR)	2:17:03 GR	Zäid Laâroussi (MAR)	2:17:18	Abderrahime Bouramdane (MAR)	2:18:46
20 km walk	Denis Langlois (FRA)	1:30:47	David Boulanger (FRA)	1:31:16	Hassanine Sebei (TUN)	1:32:36
High jump	Mustapha Raifak (FRA)	2.24 m	Kwaku Boateng (CAN); Eduard Sebestyén (ROU)	2.20 m	Not awarded	
Pole vault	Damiel Dossévi (FRA)	5.40 m	Pierre-Charles Peuf (FRA)	5.30 m	Robert Hanson (CAN)	5.20 m
Long jump	Salim Sdiri (FRA)	7.98 m	Tarik Bougtaïb (MAR)	7.78 m (w)†	Arnaud Casquette (MRI)	7.76 m (w) (wind: 2.4 m/s)
Triple jump	Tarik Bougtaïb (MAR)	16.91 m	Yahya Berrabah (MAR)	16.44 m	Daniel Donovici (ROU)	16.11 m
Shot put	Yves Niaré (FRA)	18.64 m	Stéphane Szuster (FRA)	17.19 m	Badri Obeid (LIB)	15.49 m
Discus throw	Yves Niaré (FRA)	54.15 m	Bertrand Vili (FRA)	54.05 m	Eric Forshaw (CAN)	52.80 m
Hammer throw	James Steacy (CAN)	71.90 m	Christophe Épalle (FRA)	71.41 m	Cosmin Sorescu (ROU)	67.43 m
Javelin throw	David Brisseault (FRA)	71.64 m	Vitoli Tipotio (FRA)	67.79 m	Fabio Ramsamy (MRI)	65.54 m
Decathlon	Romain Barras (FRA)	8046 pts	Nadir El Fassi (FRA)	7307 pts	Patrick Russel (CAN)	7097 pts

- † = Wind speed was not recorded for this jump

=== Women ===
Event	Gold		Silver		Bronze	
100 metres	Véronique Mang (FRA)	11.40	Amandine Allou Affoue (CIV)	11.67	Fabienne Beret-Martinel (FRA)	11.72
200 metres	Kaltouma Nadjina (CHA)	22.92	Aurélie Kamga (FRA)	23.72	Phara Anacharsis (FRA)	23.75
400 metres	Kaltouma Nadjina (CHA)	52.12	Fatou Bintou Fall (SEN)	52.57	Solen Désert (FRA)	53.57
800 metres	Seltana Aït Hammou (MAR)	2:04.63	Mihaela Neacșu (ROU)	2:05.30	Saïda El Mehdi (MAR)	2:06.49
1500 metres	Seltana Aït Hammou (MAR)	4:34.32	Saïda El Mehdi (MAR)	4:34.46	Mariem Alaoui Selsouli (MAR)	4:35.60
5000 metres	Zhor El Kamch (MAR)	16:19.71	Bouchra Chaâbi (MAR)	16:21.54	Christine Bardelle (FRA)	16:38.02
10,000 metres	Zhor El Kamch (MAR)	33:41.28 GR	Malika Asahssah (MAR)	34:41.23	Fatima Ayachi (MAR)	34:59.34
100 metres hurdles	Joanna Bujak (FRA)	13.47	Carole Kaboud Mebam (CMR)	13.58	Elisabeth Davin (BEL)	13.65
400 metres hurdles	Sylvanie Morandais (FRA)	58.27	Aïssata Soulama (BUR)	58.40	Aurore Kassambara (FRA)	59.45
4×100 metres relay	France (FRA); Véronique Mang; Fabienn Beret-Martinel; Aurélie Kamga; Carima Louami	44.61	Ivory Coast (CIV); Estelle Brou; Makari Sanganoko; Louise Ayétotché; Amandine Allou Affoue	45.36	Burkina Faso (BUR); Mariette Mien; Sarah Tondé; Kadidiatou Traoré; Béatrice Kamboulé	45.99 NR
4×400 metres relay	France (FRA); Phara Anacharsis; Aurelie Kamga; Aurore Kassambara; Sylvanie Morandais	3:37.91	Canada (CAN); Lauren Seibel; Tasha Monroe; Melina Thibodeau; Esther Akinsulie	3:40.96	Morocco (MAR); Saïda El Mehdi; Halima Hachlaf; Seltana Aït Hammou; Hanane Skhyi	3:42.48
Marathon	Céline Cormerais (FRA); Eléna Fétizon (FRA)	2:45:28	Not awarded		Epiphanie Nyirabaramé (RWA)	2:50:13
High jump	Whitney Evans (CAN)	1.83 m	Andreea Ispan (ROU)	1.83 m	Beatrice Lundmark (SUI)	1.79 m
Pole vault	Kelsie Hendry (CAN)	4.15 m	Syrine Balti (TUN)	4.05 m	Amélie Delzenne (FRA)	3.95 m
Long jump	Elise Vesanes (FRA)	6.42 m	Céline Laporte (SEY)	6.24 m	Alina Militaru (ROU)	6.22 m
Triple jump	Mariette Mien (BUR)	13.23 m	Latifa Ezziraoui (MAR)	13.18 m	Béatrice Kamboulé (BUR)	13.05 m
Shot put	Jessica Cérival (FRA)	16.32 m	Elena Hila (ROU)	15.93 m	Amel Ben Khaled (TUN)	14.81 m
Discus throw	Ileana Brânduşoiu (ROU)	52.28 m	Agnès Teppe (FRA)	49.52 m	Suzanne Kragbé (CIV)	48.72 m
Hammer throw	Stéphanie Falzon (FRA)	65.12 m	Amélie Perrin (FRA)	64.02 m	Mihaela Melinte (ROM)	61.96 m
Javelin throw	Lindy Leveau (SEY)	53.92 m	Sephora Bissoly (FRA)	52.71 m	Karine Hervieu (FRA)	51.34 m

== Medal table ==
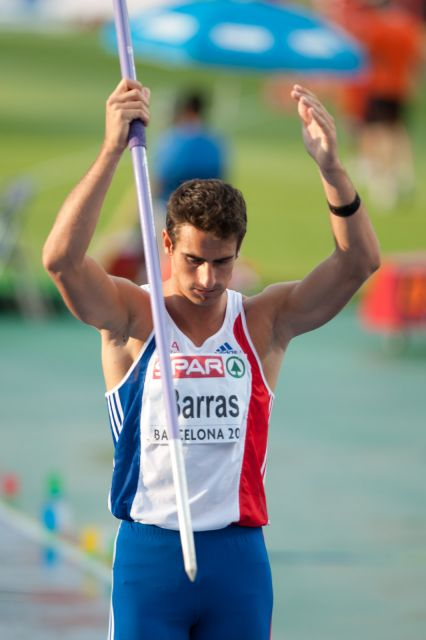
Romain Barras broke the 8000-point barrier in the decathlon to become one of 19 French victors.

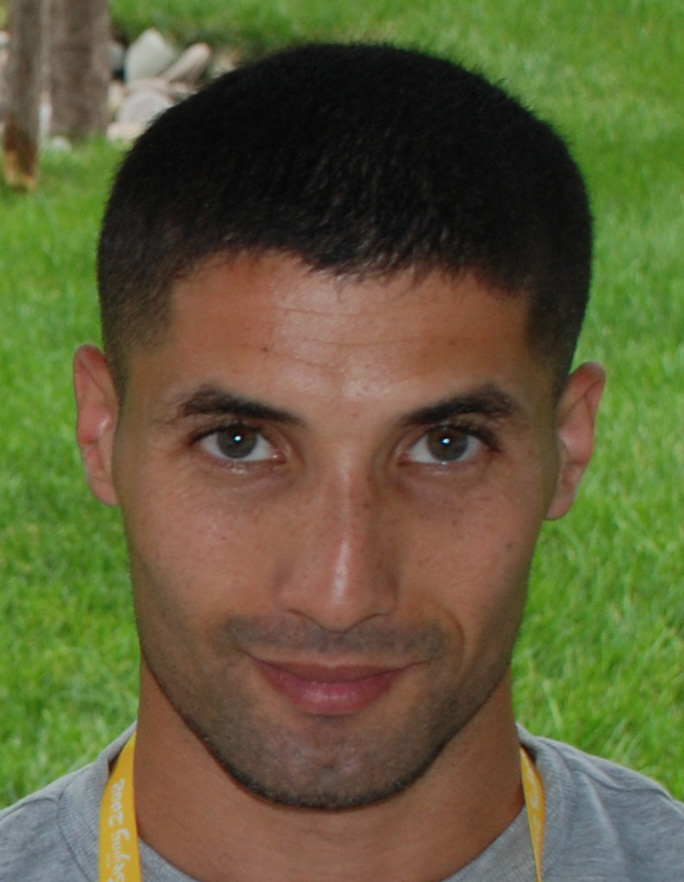
Salim Sdiri of France won the long jump

Rank	Nation	Gold	Silver	Bronze	Total
1	France	19	12	8	39
2	Morocco	11	11	9	31
3	Canada	3	3	3	9
4	Ivory Coast	2	4	1	7
5	Burkina Faso	2	1	3	6
6	Chad	2	0	0	2
7	Romania	1	4	4	9
8	Senegal	1	2	2	5
9	Seychelles	1	1	0	2
10	Rwanda	1	0	2	3
11	Benin	1	0	0	1
12	Mauritius	0	2	3	5
13	Tunisia	0	1	2	3
14	Cameroon	0	1	0	1
14	Mali	0	1	0	1
16	Belgium	0	0	1	1
16	Egypt	0	0	1	1
16	Lebanon	0	0	1	1
16	Madagascar	0	0	1	1
16	Switzerland	0	0	1	1
Totals (20 entries)		44	43	42	129

- Note: Arnaud Casquette of Mauritius won long jump and relay bronze medals, but then tested positive for cannabis and was given a six-month ban. However, his medals were not stripped.

== Participating nations ==
- (Wallonia) French Community of Belgium (2)
- Benin (7)
- Burkina Faso (17)
- Burundi (3)
- Cameroon (11)
- Canada (37)
- Central African Republic (7)
- Chad (3)
- Democratic Republic of the Congo (6)
- Egypt (2)
- Equatorial Guinea (4)
- France (61)
- Gabon (10)
- Guinea (7)
- Guinea-Bissau (2)
- Ivory Coast (10)
- Lebanon (3)
- Luxembourg (3)
- Madagascar (9)
- Mali (3)
- Mauritania (4)
- Mauritius (9)
- Monaco (2)
- Morocco (41)
- New Brunswick (5)
- Niger (19)
- Quebec (9)
- Republic of the Congo (10)
- Romania (14)
- Rwanda (5)
- Saint Lucia (2)
- Senegal (14)
- Seychelles (4)
- Switzerland (5)
- Togo (4)
- Tunisia (4)
