= 2008 African Championships in Athletics – Men's 4 × 100 metres relay =

The men's 4 x 100 metres relay at the 2008 African Championships in Athletics was held on May 2.

== Results ==
Rank	Lane	Nation	Competitors	Time	Notes
1st place, gold medalist(s)	5	South Africa	Hannes Dreyer, Corne Du Plessis, Sergio Mullins, Thuso Mpaung	38.75	
2nd place, silver medalist(s)	4	Ghana	Togoh Victor, Allah Laryea-Akrong, Seth Amoo, Eric Nkansah	40.30	
3rd place, bronze medalist(s)	8	Cameroon	Idrissa Adam, François Belinga, Alain Olivier Nyounai, Joseph Batangdon	40.60	
4	6	Ethiopia	Abyot Lencho, Mohammed-jud Misbah, Terefe Takiso, Wetere Galcha	40.76	
5	3	Ivory Coast	Seydou Ouédraogo, Marius Loua Siapade, Dazi Conet Theodore Kouassi, Éric Pacôme N'Dri	42.16	
6	7	Chad	Moumi Sebergue, Bourma Malato Ouya, Mounir Mahadi, Mahamat Kadre Moussa	43.21	
	2	Nigeria	Deji Aliu, Obinna Metu, Uchenna Emedolu, Adetoyi Durotoye	DNF	
