= 2004 African Championships in Athletics – Men's 100 metres =

The men's 100 metres event at the 2004 African Championships in Athletics was held in Brazzaville, Republic of the Congo on July 14–15.

== Medalists ==
Gold	Silver	Bronze
Olusoji Fasuba; Nigeria	Idrissa Sanou; Burkina Faso	Jaysuma Saidy Ndure; Gambia

== Results ==
=== Heats ===
Wind:
Heat 1: +2.6 m/s, Heat 2: -0.5 m/s, Heat 3: +1.1 m/s, Heat 4: +1.7 m/s, Heat 5: +1.5 m/s, Heat 6: +0.6 m/s

Rank	Heat	Name	Nationality	Time	Notes
1	1	Jaysuma Saidy Ndure	Gambia	10.60	Q
2	1	Roger Angouno Moke	Republic of the Congo	10.60	Q
3	1	Benedictus Botha	Namibia	10.99	
4	1	Clement Agyeman	Ghana	11.04	
5	1	Rahmane Liady	Benin	11.28	
1	2	Tamunosiki Atorudibo	Nigeria	10.50	Q
2	2	Lee Roy Newton	South Africa	10.53	Q
3	2	Hadhari Djaffar	Comoros	10.72	q
4	2	Gilbert Opiyo	Kenya	10.73	q
5	2	Wetere Galcha	Ethiopia	11.02	
6	2	Richard Kombo Mbimbi	Democratic Republic of the Congo	11.20	
1	3	Idrissa Sanou	Burkina Faso	10.44	Q
2	3	Souhalia Alamou	Benin	10.48	Q
3	3	Alain Olivier Nyounai	Cameroon	10.72	q
4	3	Malang Sané	Senegal	10.81	
5	3	Arsène Kouadio	Ivory Coast	11.09	
6	3	Alfred Engone	Gabon	11.22	
1	4	Aaron Egbele	Nigeria	10.53	Q
2	4	Tlhalosang Molapisi	Botswana	10.67	Q
3	4	Deon du Toit	South Africa	11.03	
4	4	Enrico Louis	Mauritius	11.14	
5	4	Christopher Sayeh	Liberia	11.32	
1	5	Siapade Marius Loua	Ivory Coast	10.69	Q
2	5	Claude Toukene	Cameroon	10.75	Q
3	5	Henri Toffa	Benin	11.01	
	5	Djikoloum Mobele	Chad	DNF	
1	6	Olusoji Fasuba	Nigeria	10.67	Q
2	6	Gora Diop	Senegal	10.78	Q
3	6	Emmanuel Ngom Priso	Cameroon	10.81	q
4	6	Chelly Ngoualetou Momala	Republic of the Congo	10.95	

=== Semifinals ===
Wind:
Heat 1: +0.1 m/s, Heat 2: +0.1 m/s

Rank	Heat	Name	Nationality	Time	Notes
1	1	Olusoji Fasuba	Nigeria	10.23	Q
2	1	Idrissa Sanou	Burkina Faso	10.30	Q
3	1	Aaron Egbele	Nigeria	10.36	Q
4	2	Tamunosiki Atorudibo	Nigeria	10.38	Q
5	1	Lee Roy Newton	South Africa	10.39	Q
6	2	Souhalia Alamou	Benin	10.40	Q
7	2	Jaysuma Saidy Ndure	Gambia	10.41	Q
8	2	Siapade Marius Loua	Ivory Coast	10.53	Q
9	2	Hadhari Djaffar	Comoros	10.57	
10	2	Tlhalosang Molapisi	Botswana	10.61	
11	1	Gora Diop	Senegal	10.75	
12	2	Gilbert Opiyo	Kenya	10.76	
13	1	Alain Olivier Nyounai	Cameroon	10.77	
14	1	Emmanuel Ngom Priso	Cameroon	10.80	
15	1	Roger Angouno Moke	Republic of the Congo	11.44	
	2	Claude Toukene	Cameroon	DNS	

=== Final ===
Wind: 0.0 m/s

Rank	Name	Nationality	Time	Notes
1st place, gold medalist(s)	Olusoji Fasuba	Nigeria	10.21	
2nd place, silver medalist(s)	Idrissa Sanou	Burkina Faso	10.37	
3rd place, bronze medalist(s)	Jaysuma Saidy Ndure	Gambia	10.43	
4	Souhalia Alamou	Benin	10.44	
5	Lee Roy Newton	South Africa	10.48	
	Aaron Egbele	Nigeria	DQ	
	Siapade Marius Loua	Ivory Coast	DNS	
	Tamunosiki Atorudibo	Nigeria	DNS	
