= Leonard Scott (sprinter) =

American sprinter

Personal information
- Nationality: United States
- Born: January 19, 1980 (age 46) Zachary, Louisiana
- Height: 5 ft 11 in (1.80 m)
- Weight: 178 lb (81 kg)

Sport
- Sport: Running
- Event(s): 60 metres, 100 metres
Medal record
Men's Athletics
Representing the United States
World Indoor Championships
Gold medal – first place	2006 Moscow	60 m
World Athletics Final
Silver medal – second place	2006 Stuttgart	100 m

Leonard Scott (born January 19, 1980) is a former American sprinter, competing mainly in the 100 meters event. Scott attended the University of Tennessee on a track scholarship and turned professional in 2002. In 2005, he joined the exclusive list of sprinters to run the 100 in less than 10 seconds. A month later, Scott finished sixth at the 2005 World Championships. Having overcome eventual silver medal winner Michael Frater in the semifinal, he had been among the medal favorites.

In 2006, Scott won at the World Indoor Championships in Moscow, clocking a world leading time of 6.50 seconds in the 60 meters. He also finished second in the World Athletics Final that year, with a personal best of 9.91 seconds.

== Personal bests ==
Event	Time (seconds)	Date	Venue
50 meters	5.58	February 26, 2005	Liévin, France
55 meters	6.07	February 20, 1999	Gainesville, Florida, United States
60 meters	6.46	February 26, 2005	Liévin, France
100 meters	9.91	September 9, 2006	Stuttgart, Germany
200 meters	20.34	May 11, 2005	Columbia, South Carolina, United States

- All information from IAAF Profile.
