= Athletics at the 2008 Summer Olympics – Men's 100 metres =

Men's 100 metres at the Games of the XXIX Olympiad
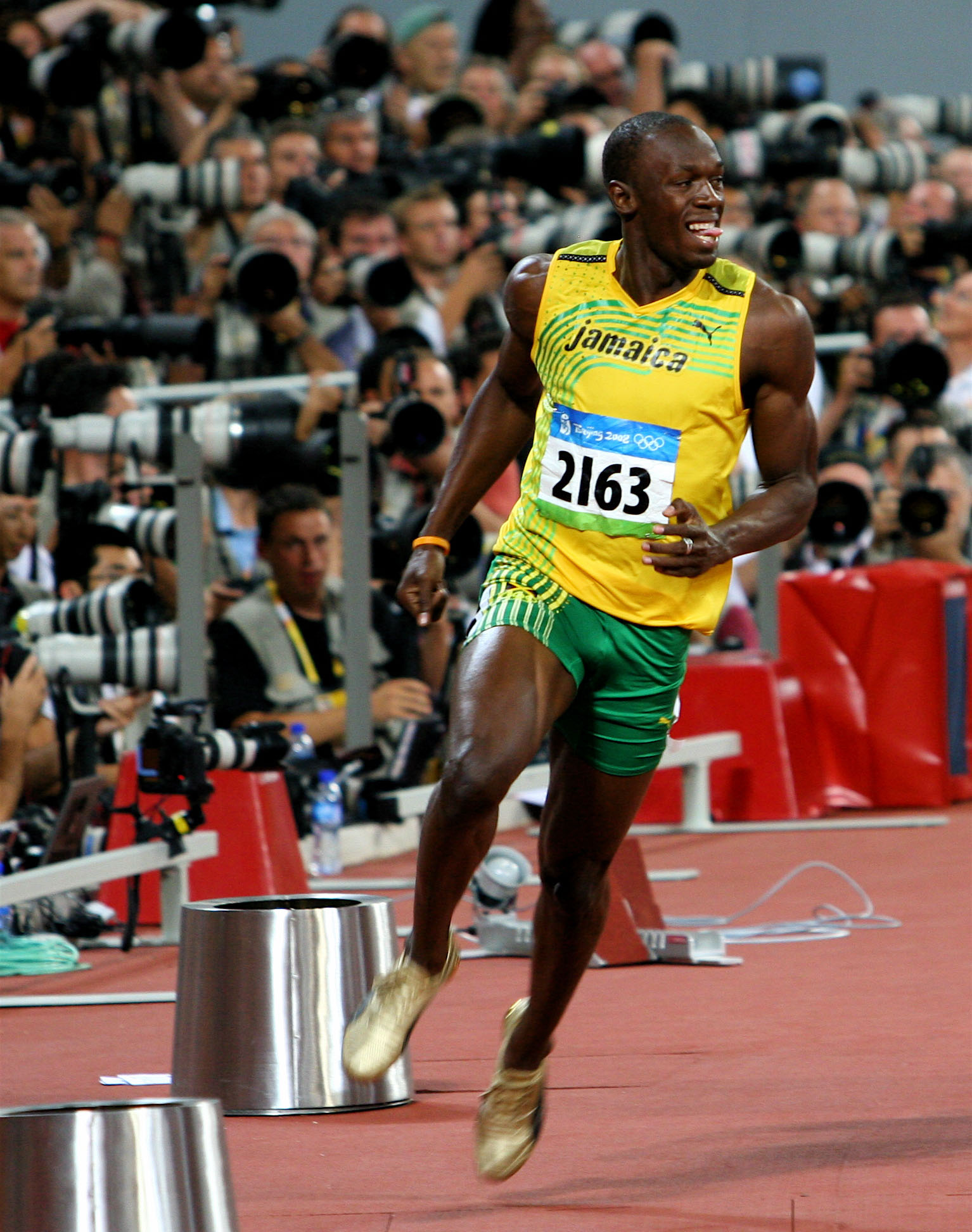
- Bolt after winning the 100m final
- Venue: Beijing National Stadium
- Dates: 15 August (heats and quarterfinals); 16 August (semifinals and final)
- Competitors: 80 from 64 nations
- Winning time: 9.69 WR

Medalists
1st place, gold medalist(s)		Usain Bolt; Jamaica
2nd place, silver medalist(s)		Richard Thompson; Trinidad and Tobago
3rd place, bronze medalist(s)		Walter Dix; United States

External videos
- https://www.youtube.com/watch?v=o-urnlaJpOA Official video highlights

The men's 100 metres sprint event at the 2008 Olympic Games took place on 15 and 16 August at the Beijing National Stadium. 80 athletes from 64 nations competed. Each nation was limited to 3 athletes per rules in force since the 1930 Olympic Congress. The final was won by Jamaican Usain Bolt in a world record time of 9.69 seconds. It was Jamaica's first title in the event, and first medal in the event since 1976. Jamaica became the first country to join the men's 100 metre winners since Trinidad and Tobago, also in 1976; Richard Thompson won the country's fourth overall medal in the event with his silver.

Holding a considerable lead 70 metres (230 ft) into the race, Bolt opened his arms in celebration before slapping his chest. British athlete and television presenter Kriss Akabusi criticized this gesture as showboating, noting that it cost Bolt an even faster record time. IOC president Jacques Rogge also criticized Bolt's actions as disrespectful. Bolt denied that this was the purpose of his mid-race celebration, stating, "I wasn't bragging. When I saw I wasn't covered, I was just happy."

== Summary ==
Prior to the 2008 season, Usain Bolt was known as a 200-metre sprinter, having set the world youth best in the event four years earlier; he had only run in the 100 metres the year before, with a one-off race in Rethymno. While people were impressed with his time of 10.03 seconds, Bolt was not seen as a threat by other 100-metre sprinters who had previously hit times of 9.9 seconds.

In early May, Bolt persuaded his coach to let him try competing in the 100 metre sprint again. His resulting time of 9.76 seconds was the second-fastest in history, only .02 seconds behind fellow Jamaican Asafa Powell's world record. At the end of the month he entered another 100 metres at the Adidas Grand Prix in New York City. The result was a new world record of 9.72 seconds.

While Bolt's slow starts were seen as a liability, his speed once moving was difficult for other athletes to match. Bolt achieved the fastest times in both the quarterfinal and semi-final rounds, while injured Gay and Obikwelu were eliminated. The center lanes of the final, reserved for the fastest qualifiers, included Bolt, Powell, Dix and another collegiate phenom from LSU, Richard Thompson.

In the final, the third Jamaican in the race, Michael Frater, got the best start, along with Thompson and Darvis Patton. 30 m (98 ft) into the race, Bolt had reached his full running position and had pulled even with the leader, Thompson. By the next 20 m (66 ft), Bolt had pulled away, with Thompson breaking up a sweep of Frater and Powell.

20 metres before the finish, already with a 3-metre (9.8 ft) lead, Bolt held out his arms in celebration; behind him, Dix and Churandy Martina made a late rush to overtake Frater and Powell. Turning to look back at his fellow competitors, Bolt crossed the finish line sideways with his arms outstretched, finishing with a new world record of 9.69 seconds. Thompson later said that "I could see him slowing down ahead as I was still pumping away."

== Background ==
The 2008 Olympic Games was the 26th time the event was held, having appeared at every Olympics since the first in 1896. Four finalists from 2004 returned: silver medalist Francis Obikwelu of Portugal, fifth-place finisher Asafa Powell of Jamaica, sixth-place finisher Kim Collins of Saint Kitts and Nevis, and Aziz Zakari of Ghana, who had been unable to finish the final. Collins and Zakari had also been to the final in 2000. Defending gold medalist Justin Gatlin was banned at the time for failing a second drugs test, testing positive for testosterone.

In Gatlin's absence, the United States team was led by Tyson Gay, the reigning world champion, who had suffered a hamstring injury at the U.S. trials. An ascendant Jamaican team included Powell, who had held the world record from 2005 to 2008, and Usain Bolt, who had taken the world record in May 2008.

The Czech Republic, the Marshall Islands, and Tuvalu appeared in the event for the first time. The United States made its 25th appearance in the event, the most of any country, having missed only the boycotted 1980 Olympic Games.

== Qualification ==
Each National Olympic Committee (NOC) was able to enter up to three entrants providing they had met the A qualifying standard (10.21 seconds) in the qualifying period (1 January 2007 to 23 July 2008). NOCs were also permitted to enter one athlete providing he had met the B standard (10.28 seconds) in the same qualifying period.

== Competition format ==
The event retained the same basic four round format introduced in 1920: heats, quarterfinals, semifinals, and a final. The "fastest loser" system, introduced in 1968, was used again to ensure that the quarterfinals and subsequent rounds had exactly 8 runners per heat; this time, the system was used in both the heats and quarterfinals.

The first round consisted of 10 heats, each with 8 or 9 athletes. The top three runners in each heat advanced, along with the next ten fastest runners overall. This made 40 quarterfinalists, who were divided into 5 heats of 8 runners. The top three runners in each quarterfinal advanced, with one "fastest loser" place. The 16 semifinalists competed in two heats of 8, with the top four in each semifinal advancing to the eight-man final.

== Records ==
Prior to the competition, the existing world record, Olympic record, and world leading time were as follows:

World record	Usain Bolt (JAM)	9.72 seconds	New York City, United States	31 May 2008
Olympic record	Donovan Bailey (CAN)	9.84 seconds	Atlanta, United States	27 July 1996
World leading	Usain Bolt (JAM)	9.72 seconds	New York City, United States	31 May 2008

The following new world and Olympic records were set during the competition:

Date	Event	Athlete	Time	OR	WR
16 August	Final	Usain Bolt (JAM)	9.69 seconds	OR	WR

== Schedule ==
All times are China Standard Time (UTC+8).

Date	Time	Round
Friday, 15 August 2008	09:45 19:45	Heats Quarterfinals
Saturday, 16 August 2008	20:00 22:30	Semifinals Final

== Disqualification ==
Eight years after the event, the IOC reanalyzed doping samples and disqualified Samuel Francis and Finks Chinger for having stanozolol in their samples.

== Results ==
=== Heats ===
The first round was held on 15 August. The first three runners of each heat plus the next ten overall fastest runners qualified for the second round.

==== Heat 1 ====
Rank	Lane	Athlete	Nation	Reaction	Time	Notes
1	3	Usain Bolt	Jamaica	0.186	10.20	Q
2	9	Daniel Bailey	Antigua and Barbuda	0.198	10.24	Q
3	6	Vicente de Lima	Brazil	0.168	10.26	Q, SB
4	2	Henry Vizcaíno	Cuba	0.157	10.28	q
5	4	Fabio Cerutti	Italy	0.136	10.49	
6	5	Jurgen Themen	Suriname	0.179	10.61	PB
7	8	Moses Kamut	Vanuatu	0.181	10.81	
8	7	Francis Manioru	Solomon Islands	0.197	11.09	
				Wind: -0.2 m/s		

==== Heat 2 ====
Rank	Lane	Athlete	Nation	Reaction	Time	Notes
1	5	Asafa Powell	Jamaica	0.142	10.16	Q
2	3	Kim Collins	Saint Kitts and Nevis	0.162	10.17	Q
3	7	Craig Pickering	Great Britain	0.174	10.21	Q
4	2	Daniel Grueso	Colombia	0.178	10.35	q
5	9	Dariusz Kuć	Poland	0.144	10.44	q
6	8	Béranger Bosse	Central African Republic	0.144	10.51	SB
7	6	Aisea Tohi	Tonga	0.159	11.17	
8	4	Roman William Cress	Marshall Islands	0.190	11.18	
				Wind: 0.0 m/s		

==== Heat 3 ====
Rank	Lane	Athlete	Nation	Reaction	Time	Notes
1	8	Richard Thompson	Trinidad and Tobago	0.188	10.24	Q
2	5	Martial Mbandjock	France	0.162	10.26	Q
3	4	Simone Collio	Italy	0.140	10.32	Q
4	2	Aziz Zakari	Ghana	0.177	10.34	q
5	6	Andrew Hinds	Barbados	0.140	10.35	q
6	3	Suryo Agung Wibowo	Indonesia	0.175	10.46	
7	7	Jared Lewis	Saint Vincent and the Grenadines	0.123	11.00	
8	9	Rabangaki Nawai	Kiribati	0.152	11.29	SB
				Wind: 0.0 m/s		

==== Heat 4 ====
Rank	Lane	Athlete	Nation	Reaction	Time	Notes
1	3	Michael Frater	Jamaica	0.156	10.15	Q
2	4	Pierre Browne	Canada	0.141	10.22	Q
3	6	Darrel Brown	Trinidad and Tobago	0.139	10.22	Q
4	7	Nobuharu Asahara	Japan	0.160	10.25	q
5	9	Holder da Silva	Guinea-Bissau	0.184	10.58	
6	2	Idrissa Sanou	Burkina Faso	0.171	10.63	
7	8	Ghyd-Kermeliss-Holly Olonghot	Republic of the Congo	0.172	11.01	
8	5	Massoud Azizi	Afghanistan	0.160	11.45	
				Wind: 0.2 m/s		

==== Heat 5 ====
Rank	Lane	Athlete	Nation	Reaction	Time	Notes
1	2	Tyson Gay	United States	0.148	10.22	Q
2	5	Olusoji A. Fasuba	Nigeria	0.156	10.29	Q
3	4	José Carlos Moreira	Brazil	0.192	10.29	Q
4	7	Ángel David Rodríguez	Spain	0.145	10.34	q
5	9	Lukas Milo	Czech Republic	0.145	10.52	
6	8	Mhadjou Youssouf	Comoros	0.170	10.62	PB
7	3	Danny D'Souza	Seychelles	0.180	11.00	
8	6	Shanahan Sanitoa	American Samoa	0.158	12.60	
				Wind: 0.7 m/s		

==== Heat 6 ====
Rank	Lane	Athlete	Nation	Reaction	Time	Notes
1	5	Tyrone Edgar	Great Britain	0.138	10.13	Q
2	6	Darvis Patton	United States	0.149	10.25	Q
3	7	Ronald Pognon	France	0.167	10.26	Q
4	2	Hu Kai	China	0.152	10.39	q
5	4	Abdullah Al-Sooli	Oman	0.153	10.53	PB
6	8	Desislav Gunev	Bulgaria	0.152	10.66	
7	3	Ali Shareef	Maldives	0.171	11.11	NR
8	9	Souksavanh Tonsacktheva	Laos	0.183	11.51	
				Wind: 0.9 m/s		

==== Heat 7 ====
Rank	Lane	Athlete	Nation	Reaction	Time	Notes
1	4	Francis Obikwelu	Portugal	0.190	10.25	Q
2	2	Obinna Metu	Nigeria	0.176	10.34	Q
3	5	Walter Dix	United States	0.167	10.35	Q
4	6	Anson Henry	Canada	0.138	10.37	q
5	8	Dmytro Hlushchenko	Ukraine	0.200	10.57	
6	3	Calvin Kang Li Loong	Singapore	0.140	10.73	
7	9	Jesse Tamangrow	Palau	0.146	11.38	PB
8	7	Reginaldo Micha Ndong	Equatorial Guinea	0.242	11.61	
				Wind: -1.4 m/s		

==== Heat 8 ====
Rank	Lane	Athlete	Nation	Reaction	Time	Notes
1	3	Derrick Atkins	Bahamas	0.162	10.28	Q
2	4	Andrey Yepishin	Russia	0.172	10.34	Q
3	9	Jaysuma Saidy Ndure	Norway	0.164	10.37	Q
4	6	Uchenna Emedolu	Nigeria	0.192	10.46	
5	2	Suwaibou Sanneh	The Gambia	0.157	10.52	
6	5	Sandro Viana	Brazil	0.160	10.60	
7	7	Lai Chun Ho	Hong Kong	0.199	10.63	
8	8	Mohamed Abu Abdullah	Bangladesh	0.174	11.07	
				Wind: -0.1 m/s		

==== Heat 9 ====
Rank	Lane	Athlete	Nation	Reaction	Time	Notes
1	6	Samuel Francis	Qatar	0.153	10.40 DSQ	Q
2	5	Marc Burns	Trinidad and Tobago	0.160	10.46	Q
3	9	Matic Osovnikar	Slovenia	0.187	10.46	Q
4	7	Rolando Palacios	Honduras	0.189	10.49	
5	2	Ruslan Abbasov	Azerbaijan	0.154	10.58	
6	4	Sébastien Gattuso	Monaco	0.164	10.70	
7	8	Jack Howard	Federated States of Micronesia	0.204	11.03	
8	3	Gordon Heather	Cook Islands	0.214	11.41	PB
				Wind: -1.7 m/s		

==== Heat 10 ====
Rank	Lane	Athlete	Nation	Reaction	Time	Notes
1	4	Churandy Martina	Netherlands Antilles	0.164	10.35	Q
2	5	Naoki Tsukahara	Japan	0.169	10.39	Q
3	6	Simeon Williamson	Great Britain	0.183	10.42	Q
4	9	Tobias Unger	Germany	0.161	10.46	q
5	8	Franklin Nazareno	Ecuador	0.178	10.60	
6	7	Wilfried Bingangoye	Gabon	0.171	10.87	
7	2	Moumi Sebergue	Chad	0.210	11.14	
8	3	Okilani Tinilau	Tuvalu	0.174	11.48	NR
				Wind: -1.3 m/s		

=== Quarterfinals ===
The quarterfinals were held on 15 August. The first three runners of each heat plus the next overall fastest runner qualified for the semifinals.

==== Quarterfinal 1 ====
Rank	Lane	Athlete	Nation	Reaction	Time	Notes
1	4	Churandy Martina	Netherlands Antilles	0.142	9.99	Q, NR
2	7	Michael Frater	Jamaica	0.154	10.09	Q
3	6	Naoki Tsukahara	Japan	0.156	10.23	Q, SB
4	9	Simeon Williamson	Great Britain	0.127	10.32	
5	3	Henry Vizcaíno	Cuba	0.167	10.33	
6	5	Pierre Browne	Canada	0.144	10.36	
7	2	Dariusz Kuć	Poland	0.176	10.46	
8	8	Darrel Brown	Trinidad and Tobago	0.119	10.93	
				Wind: -0.1 m/s		

==== Quarterfinal 2 ====
Rank	Lane	Athlete	Nation	Reaction	Time	Notes
1	6	Richard Thompson	Trinidad and Tobago	0.170	9.99	Q
2	4	Tyson Gay	United States	0.146	10.09	Q
3	7	Martial Mbandjock	France	0.160	10.16	Q
4	5	Olusoji A. Fasuba	Nigeria	0.147	10.21	
5	2	Andrew Hinds	Barbados	0.148	10.25	
6	8	José Carlos Moreira	Brazil	0.193	10.32	
7	9	Simone Collio	Italy	0.138	10.33	
8	3	Daniel Grueso	Colombia	0.193	10.37	
				Wind: 0.0 m/s		

==== Quarterfinal 3 ====
Rank	Lane	Athlete	Nation	Reaction	Time	Notes
1	6	Marc Burns	Trinidad and Tobago	0.174	10.05	Q
2	4	Kim Collins	Saint Kitts and Nevis	0.150	10.07	Q, =SB
3	5	Tyrone Edgar	Great Britain	0.130	10.10	Q
4	7	Samuel Francis	Qatar	0.164	10.11 DSQ	Q
5	9	Ronald Pognon	France	0.167	10.21	
6	8	Matic Osovnikar	Slovenia	0.171	10.24	
7	2	Tobias Unger	Germany	0.136	10.36	
8	3	Nobuharu Asahara	Japan	0.145	10.37	
				Wind: -0.2 m/s		

==== Quarterfinal 4 ====
Rank	Lane	Athlete	Nation	Reaction	Time	Notes
1	7	Usain Bolt	Jamaica	0.165	9.92	Q
2	5	Darvis Patton	United States	0.159	10.04	Q
3	4	Francis Obikwelu	Portugal	0.168	10.09	Q
4	8	Jaysuma Saidy Ndure	Norway	0.133	10.14	
5	9	Craig Pickering	Great Britain	0.144	10.18	
6	6	Obinna Metu	Nigeria	0.174	10.27	
7	3	Anson Henry	Canada	0.142	10.33	
8	2	Ángel David Rodríguez	Spain	0.154	10.35	
				Wind: 0.1 m/s		

==== Quarterfinal 5 ====
Rank	Lane	Athlete	Nation	Reaction	Time	Notes
1	7	Asafa Powell	Jamaica	0.149	10.02	Q
2	9	Walter Dix	United States	0.163	10.08	Q
3	5	Derrick Atkins	Bahamas	0.179	10.14	Q
4	4	Daniel Bailey	Antigua and Barbuda	0.149	10.23	
5	3	Aziz Zakari	Ghana	0.167	10.24	
6	6	Andrey Yepishin	Russia	0.158	10.25	
7	8	Vicente de Lima	Brazil	0.157	10.31	
8	2	Hu Kai	China	0.165	10.40	
				Wind: -0.1 m/s		

=== Semifinals ===
The semifinals were held on 16 August. The first four runners from each semifinal qualified for the final.

==== Semifinal 1 ====
Rank	Lane	Athlete	Nation	Reaction	Time	Notes
1	7	Usain Bolt	Jamaica	0.161	9.85	Q
2	6	Walter Dix	United States	0.143	9.95	Q, SB
3	4	Marc Burns	Trinidad and Tobago	0.124	9.97	Q, =SB
4	9	Michael Frater	Jamaica	0.163	10.01	Q
5	5	Kim Collins	Saint Kitts and Nevis	0.163	10.05	SB
6	2	Derrick Atkins	Bahamas	0.159	10.13	
7	8	Tyrone Edgar	Great Britain	0.143	10.18	
—	3	Samuel Francis	Qatar	0.146	10.20 DSQ	
				Wind: -0.1 m/s		

==== Semifinal 2 ====
Rank	Lane	Athlete	Nation	Reaction	Time	Notes
1	6	Asafa Powell	Jamaica	0.161	9.91	Q
2	7	Richard Thompson	Trinidad and Tobago	0.175	9.93	Q, =PB
3	5	Churandy Martina	Netherlands Antilles	0.138	9.94	Q, NR
4	4	Darvis Patton	United States	0.149	10.03	Q
5	9	Tyson Gay	United States	0.145	10.05	
6	8	Francis Obikwelu	Portugal	0.157	10.10	
7	3	Naoki Tsukahara	Japan	0.143	10.16	SB
8	2	Martial Mbandjock	France	0.148	10.18	
				Wind: 0.3 m/s		

=== Final ===
The final was held on 16 August.

Rank	Lane	Athlete	Nation	Reaction	Time	Notes
1st place, gold medalist(s)	4	Usain Bolt	Jamaica	0.165	9.69	WR
2nd place, silver medalist(s)	5	Richard Thompson	Trinidad and Tobago	0.133	9.89	PB
3rd place, bronze medalist(s)	6	Walter Dix	United States	0.133	9.91	PB
4	9	Churandy Martina	Netherlands Antilles	0.169	9.93	NR
5	7	Asafa Powell	Jamaica	0.134	9.95	
6	2	Michael Frater	Jamaica	0.147	9.97	PB
7	8	Marc Burns	Trinidad and Tobago	0.145	10.01	
8	3	Darvis Patton	United States	0.142	10.03	
				Wind: 0.0 m/s		

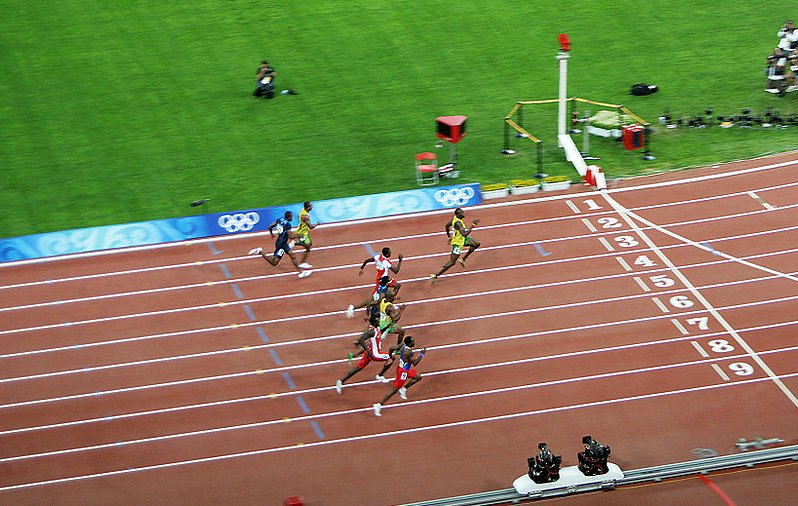
Bolt held a considerable lead over his rivals in the closing stages of the 100 m final
