= Abu Duah =

Ghanaian sprinter (born 1978)

Medal record

Men's athletics

Representing Ghana

African Championships
Gold medal – first place	2000 Algiers	4×100 m

Abu Duah (born 5 June 1978) is a Ghanaian sprinter who specializes in the 100 metres. He competed in the 4 × 400 metres relay at the 1996 Summer Olympics and the 2000 Summer Olympics.

Duah finished fifth in 4 x 100 metres relay at the 1997 World Championships, together with teammates Eric Nkansah, Aziz Zakari and Emmanuel Tuffour. This team had set a national record of 38.12 seconds in the semi-final heat.

His personal best time on the individual distance is 10.31 seconds, achieved in July 2001 in Arnhem. The Ghanaian record currently belongs to Leonard Myles-Mills with 9.98 seconds.
