= Reginaldo Ndong =

Equatoguinean sprinter

Personal information
- Born: October 14, 1986 (age 39)

Sport
- Sport: Athletics

Achievements and titles
- Personal best: 100 m: 10.96 (2005)

Reginaldo Michá Ndong (born October 14, 1986) is an Equatoguinean track and field sprint athlete who competes internationally for his country.

Reginaldo, who also went by "Reggie", qualified for his first global championship at the 2003 World Championships in Athletics, where he entered in the 100 metres. At just age 16, Ndong ran 11.47 seconds into a headwind to finish 7th in his heat.

Ndong was entered in the 100 metres at the 2004 World U20 Championships, but he didn't start the race. At a 2005 meeting in Malabo, Ndong set a hand-timed time of 11.0 seconds in the 100 m to break his personal best. He would later run 10.96 seconds to break his best again that year.

Ndong was regarded as the top sprinter from his country in the mid-2000s. At the 2005 World Championships in Athletics, seeded in the 8th 100 m heat, he ran 11.57 seconds into a headwind to place 7th, again failing to advance to the quarter-finals. Later that season at the 2005 Francophone Games, Ndong advanced past the first round of the 100 metres into the semi-finals with a 4th-place heat showing. He finished 8th in his semi-final and did not make the finals.

In 2007, Ndong competed at the 2007 All-Africa Games in the 100 metres, placing 9th in his heat. Ndong then qualified for the 2007 World Championships in Athletics in Osaka, Japan, where he placed 8th in his 100 m heat. He competed at his first global indoor championship in 2008, placing 8th in the first 60 m heat of the 2008 IAAF World Indoor Championships. He ran a time of 7.72 seconds, finishing in a tie to the hundredth with Aisea Tohi.

Ndong represented Equatorial Guinea at the 2008 Summer Olympics in Beijing. At the age of 21, Reginaldo Ndong was the youngest athlete to represent Equatorial Guinea at the 2008 Summer Olympics. He competed at the men's 100 metrees and placed 8th in his heat without advancing to the second round, splitting an 11.61-second time.
