= Karine Hervieu =

French javelin thrower

Personal information
- Nationality: France
- Born: 24 February 1982 (age 44)

Sport
- Event: Javelin throw
- Club: EA Louviers (1996 - 2006); CA Montreuil 93 (2006–present)
- Coached by: Jean François Benoit until 2006
Medal record
Representing France
Jeux de la Francophonie
Bronze medal – third place	2005 Niamey	Javelin throw

Karine Hervieu (born 24 February 1982) is a French athlete who is a specialist in the javelin throw. First competing for club EA Louviers, she left the club for CA Montreuil 93 in 2006. She trains at the same time as she is coach of the youth throwers of the club.

Karine's best national result was a first place at the 2009 French National Winter Championships. She was a bronze medallist at the 2005 Jeux de la Francophonie

== International competitions ==
Year	Competition	Venue	Position	Notes
2005	Francophone Games	Niamey, Niger	3rd	51.34 m

== National titles ==
- French Winter Throwing Championships
  - Javelin throw: 2009

== Personal records ==
Event	Performance	Location	Date
Javelin throw	54.08 m	Niort, France	4 August 2007
