= Lamin Tucker =

Sierra Leonean sprinter

Lamin Tucker (born September 15, 1982) is a sprinter from Sierra Leone. He competed in the 100 metres at the 2004 Olympic Games, failing to reach the second round.

His personal best in the 100 metres is 10.52 from 2004.

== Competition record ==
Year	Competition	Venue	Position	Event	Notes
Representing Sierra Leone
2003	All-Africa Games	Abuja, Nigeria	24th (sf)	100 m	10.83
2003	All-Africa Games	Abuja, Nigeria	7th	4x100 m relay	40.87
2004	Olympic Games	Athens, Greece	61st (h)	100 m	10.72
2005	Islamic Solidarity Games	Mecca, Saudi Arabia	12th (sf)	100 m	10.94
2006	Commonwealth Games	Melbourne, Australia	32nd (h)	100 m	10.80
2006	Commonwealth Games	Melbourne, Australia	9th (h)	4x100 m relay	40.05
