= 2004 African Championships in Athletics – Men's 4 × 100 metres relay =

Coordinates: 4°16′24.6″S 15°14′56.8″E

The men's 4 × 100 metres relay event at the 2004 African Championships in Athletics was held in Brazzaville, Republic of the Congo on July 16.

== Results ==
Rank	Nation	Competitors	Time	Notes
1st place, gold medalist(s)	Nigeria	Olusoji Fasuba, Ambrose Ezenwa, Aaron Egbele, Chinedu Oriala	38.91	
2nd place, silver medalist(s)	South Africa	Morné Nagel, Deon du Toit, Clinton Venter, Lee Roy Newton	39.59	
3rd place, bronze medalist(s)	Cameroon	Emmanuel Ngom Priso, Idrissa Adam, Alain Olivier Nyounai, Joseph Batangdon	39.87	
4	Senegal	Malang Sané, Abdou Demba Lam, Gora Diop, Oumar Loum	39.96	
5	Benin	Narcisse Tevoedjre, Henri Toffa, Josias Mevognon, Souhalia Alamou	40.62	
6	Republic of the Congo	Delivert Kimbembe, Chelly Ngoualetou Momala, Ange Camara, David Nicoua	41.34	
7	Democratic Republic of the Congo	Richard Kombo Mbimbi, Fidèle Kitengé, Mafo Tshihinga, M. Kijana	42.67	NR
