= Filipo Muller =

Tongan sprinter (born 1986)

Personal information
- Nationality: Tongan
- Born: 17 January 1986 (age 40)

Sport
- Sport: Sprinting
- Event: 100 metres

Filipo Muller (born 17 January 1986) is a Tongan sprinter. He competed in the men's 100 metres at the 2004 Summer Olympics.
