= Souhalia Alamou =

Beninese sprinter (born 1979)

Souhalia Alamou (born 31 December 1979) is a retired Beninese athlete specialising in the sprinting events. He competed at one Olympic Games and three World Championships without reaching the second round.

== Competition record ==
Year	Competition	Venue	Position	Event	Notes
Representing Benin
1998	World Junior Championships	Annecy, France	40th (h)	100 m	10.98 (wind: -0.3 m/s)
1999	All-Africa Games	Johannesburg, South Africa	25th (h)	100 m	10.65
1999	All-Africa Games	Johannesburg, South Africa	7th	4 × 100 m relay	40.25
2002	African Championships	Radès, Tunisia	10th (sf)	100 m	10.62 (w)
2002	African Championships	Radès, Tunisia	5th	4 × 100 m relay	40.99
2003	World Championships	Paris, France	37th (h)	100 m	10.46
2003	All-Africa Games	Abuja, Nigeria	10th (sf)	100 m	10.46
2003	All-Africa Games	Abuja, Nigeria	10th (h)	4 × 100 m relay	41.63
2004	World Indoor Championships	Budapest, Hungary	43rd (h)	60 m	6.92
2004	African Championships	Brazzaville, Republic of the Congo	4th	100 m	10.44
2004	African Championships	Brazzaville, Republic of the Congo	5th	4 × 100 m relay	40.62
2004	Olympic Games	Athens, Greece	47th (h)	100 m	10.48
2005	World Championships	Helsinki, Finland	43rd (h)	100 m	10.90
2006	African Championships	Bambous, Mauritius	29th (h)	100 m	35.04

N.B. Competed at the 1999 African Junior Championships in Rades Tunisia but his results were excluded due to being over-age.

== Personal bests ==
Outdoor

- 100 metres – 10.31 (wind: +1.1 m/s) (Lugano SUI June 5, 2004)
- 200 metres – 20.95 (Cotonou 2004)

Indoor

- 60 metres – 6.92 (Budapest 2004)
