= Emmanuel Ngom Priso =

French sprinter (born 1984)

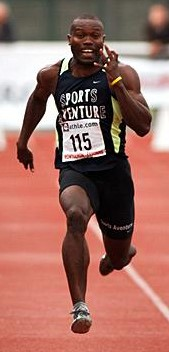

Personal information
- Full name: Emmanuel Edouard Etienne Ngom Priso
- National team: French team
- Born: December 15, 1984 (age 41) Nkongsamba
- Education: Lycée (Douala)
- Height: 182 cm (6 ft 0 in)
- Weight: 84 kg (185 lb; 13 st 3 lb)
- Spouse: Divorced
- Other interests: Creator of the A.S.C.B.B., Bankon-Barombi Sports and Cultural Association founder of the football team (Littoral regional fecafoot league) les Etoiles Bankon Barombi.

Sport
- Country: Cameroon; France
- Sport: Athletics (sprint), football, rugby, bobsleigh
- Turned pro: 2002
- Coached by: Samuel Edimo Madiba
- Now coaching: ASCBB / Les étoiles Bankon Barombi (Cameroon)

Achievements and titles
- World finals: 28th
- Regional finals: 1st - African games 2nd - Mediterranean games
- National finals: 1st - gold medal - 60m
- Commonwealth finals: 10th
- Highest world ranking: 28th
- Personal best: Gold medal - 1st place : 60 metres – 6.63
Medal record
Men's athletics
Representing Cameroon
African Championships
Bronze medal – third place	2004 Brazzaville	4×100 m

Emmanuel Edouard Etienne Ngom Priso (born 15 December 1984) is a Cameroonian-born French naturalized athlete specialising in the sprinting events. Most of his successes came in the 4 x 100 metres relay. On February 20, 2009, he became French indoor champion in the 60m in 6.63, ahead of Christophe Lemaitre.

He is also a former cameroonian football player (Nkongsamba), and a french Sevens and XIV rugby player, and practices bobsleigh at a high level.

== Competition record ==
Year	Competition	Venue	Position	Event	Notes
Representing Cameroon
2002	World Junior Championships	Kingston, Jamaica	28th (h)	100 m	10.74 (wind: 0.0 m/s)
2002	World Junior Championships	Kingston, Jamaica	34th (h)	200 m	21.81 (wind: +1.5 m/s)
2003	African Junior Championships	Garoua, Cameroon	1st	100 m	10.50 (w)
2003	African Junior Championships	Garoua, Cameroon	9th (h)	200 m	21.88
2003	All-Africa Games	Abuja, Nigeria	14th (sf)	100 m	10.57
2003	All-Africa Games	Abuja, Nigeria	4th	4 × 100 m relay	39.94
2004	African Championships	Brazzaville, Republic of the Congo	14th (sf)	100 m	10.80
2004	African Championships	Brazzaville, Republic of the Congo	3rd	4 × 100 m relay	39.87
2006	Commonwealth Games	Melbourne, Australia	22nd (qf)	100 m	10.66
2006	Commonwealth Games	Melbourne, Australia	10th (h)	4 × 100 m relay	40.23
Representing France
2009	Mediterranean Games	Pescara, Italy	8th	100 m	10.47
2009	Mediterranean Games	Pescara, Italy	2nd	4 × 100 m relay	39.49
2009	Jeux de la Francophonie	Beirut, Lebanon	7th	100 m	10.45
2009	Jeux de la Francophonie	Beirut, Lebanon	7th	4 × 100 m relay	40.73

== Personal bests ==
Outdoor

- 100 metres – 10.28 (+1.9 m/s) (Tomblaine 2006)
- 200 metres – 21.21 (-0.8 m.s) (Eaubonne 2007)

Indoor

- 60 metres – 6.63 (Liévin 2009)
- 200 metres – 21.16 (Eaubonne 2007)

== Rugby ==
He started at Pont-de-l'Arche club, where he took part in the team's rise three consecutive seasons, until reaching Honor. At the same time, he joined the French army's rugby sevens team (combined arms team), as well as the air force rugby union team. He is also in demand by the national French rugby 7 team with whom he carries out numerous training sessions.

He was then enrolled in Petit-Couronne's club, the XV Couronnais in Haute-Normandie, and participated in the team's rise to federal 3.

The positions he occupies are that of Center and winger in rugby union as well as in rugby sevens.

== Bobsleigh ==
In 2017, he joined a newly created Reims bobsleigh team, with a view to qualifying as team 3 of France for the Pyeongchang Winter Olympics in South Korea, from February 9 to 25, 2018, alongside four other french athletes: Thibault Godefroy (pilot), Jérémy Baillard (pusher), Jason Aguemon (American football), and Alan Alais (athletics) and David Baechler, the team manager.

In 2020, with weightlifter David Baechler, the team manager and Jérémy Baillard (pusher), he participated in the preparation of their team with a view to participating in the French Pushing Cup as well as the French Cup. Europe then to the 2022 Winter Olympics.

== In Cameroun ==
He is the third son of His Majesty Emmanuel Richard Blaise Priso Ngom Priso nu Loa Mbasé, Commander of the Cameroonian Order of Merit, Knight and Officer in the National Order of Valor, Superior Chief of Bankon (Abo-north canton), died on April 10, 2018, and the brother of His Majesty Patrice Ngom Priso, current Superior Chief of Bankons Abo-Nord, in the Littoral Region, Cameroon.

In 2020, he founded a 1990's law association, the A.S.C.B.B., Bankon-Barombi Sports and Cultural Association, whose headquarters is in Bonalea. This association aims to promote the Bankon sports movement, but also to promote Bankon and Barombi culture. In this capacity, he founded - and chairs - a sports club whose football team plays in the Littoral regional fecafoot league, "les Etoiles Bankon Barombi".

== Family ==
Former Air Force rifle commando, Emmanuel Ngom Priso is the father of four children: Daniel, Evan, Kory, Jalane.
