= Marius Loua =

Ivorian sprinter (born 1982)

Siapade Marius Loua (born 27 July 1982) is a retired Ivorian sprinter who specialized in the 100 and 200 metres.

In the 100 metres he finished fourth at the 2005 Jeux de la Francophonie. He also competed at the 2002 African Championships (semi-final), the 2003 All-Africa Games (semi-final), the 2004 African Championships (semi-final, reached the final but did not start), the 2007 All-Africa Games (semi-final).

In the 200 metres he competed at the 2002 African Championships (semi-final), won the silver medal at the 2005 Jeux de la Francophonie, competed at the 2006 African Championships (semi-final), the 2007 All-Africa Games (semi-final), the 2008 African Championships, the 2009 Jeux de la Francophonie (semi-final) and the 2010 African Championships.

As a part of the Ivorian 4 × 100 metres relay team he was disqualified at the 2002 African Championships, finished seventh at the 2003 All-Africa Games, gold medal at the 2005 Jeux de la Francophonie, was disqualified at the 2007 All-Africa Games, finished fifth at the 2008 African Championships, fourth at the 2009 Jeux de la Francophonie, sixth at the 2010 African Championships and fourth at the 2012 African Championships. He competed at the 2003 World Championships without reaching the final.

His personal best times were 10.43 seconds in the 100 metres, achieved in April 2004 in Dakar; and 21.01 seconds in the 200 metres, achieved in December 2005 in Niamey.
