= Olusoji Fasuba =

Nigerian sprinter (born 1984)

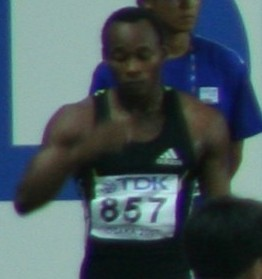
- Olusoji Fasuba in 2007

Personal information
- Nationality: Nigerian
- Born: 9 July 1984 (age 42)
- Height: 175 cm (5 ft 9 in)
- Weight: 70 kg (154 lb)

Sport
- Sport: Running

Achievements and titles
- Personal bests: 100 m: 9.85; 200 m: 20.52
Medal record
Men's athletics
Representing Nigeria
Olympic Games
| Bronze medal – third place | 2004 Athens | 4×100 m |
World Indoor Championships
| Gold medal – first place | 2008 Valencia | 60 m |
All-Africa Games
| Gold medal – first place | 2007 Algiers | 100 m |
| Gold medal – first place | 2007 Algiers | 4×100 m |
African Championships
| Gold medal – first place | 2004 Brazzaville | 100 m |
| Gold medal – first place | 2004 Brazzaville | 4×100 m |
| Gold medal – first place | 2006 Bambous | 100 m |
| Gold medal – first place | 2006 Bambous | 4×100 m |
| Gold medal – first place | 2008 Addis Ababa | 100 m |
Afro-Asian Games
| Gold medal – first place | 2003 Hyderabad | 100 m |
Commonwealth Games
| Silver medal – second place | 2006 Melbourne | 100 m |

Olusoji Adetokunbo Fasuba (born 9 July 1984) is a Nigerian sprinter who specializes in the 100 metres. He was the African record holder in the event with 9.85 seconds until Akani Simbine broke it in July 2021 with 9.84 seconds.

He was a member of the Nigerian bronze medal winning team in the 4 × 100 metres relay at the 2004 Olympic Games. The same year he won the African Championships in 100 metres. He won the silver medal at the 2006 Commonwealth Games behind Asafa Powell and was the indoor world champion over 60 metres in 2008, becoming the first African to complete the feat.

== Early life ==
Fasuba was born in Sapele, Delta State in Nigeria, the eldest of three children. Sprinting was part of his family life as his mother, a Jamaican, was a runner in her youth and is the cousin of Don Quarrie, a 200 metres Olympic gold medallist. His parents encouraged him to run from a young age and he was so fast that secondary schools would ask him to compete for them, even though he was of primary school age. Furthermore, he was a proficient football, volleyball or basketball player and, as a result, he managed to attend Merit Mixed Secondary School through an athletics scholarship. He dominated the school's athletics events, winning not only the sprint events but also the high jump and long jump. Fasuba continued his studies at Obafemi Awolowo University in Ile-Ife but found the work difficult. Encouraged by his mother, he decided to leave the education system in favour of athletics, his foremost passion.

== Athletics career ==
Fasuba had his breakthrough year in 2003, starting with the 2003 national trials. He was selected for the 4 × 100 metres relay at the 2003 World Championships in Athletics and finished fourth with the Nigerian team. Fasuba closed the year with a win in the 100 m at the inaugural Afro-Asian Games. In 2004, he went on to win at the 2004 African Championships in Athletics, and won his first major medal a few months later – an Olympic bronze medal as part of the 4 × 100 m relay team at the 2004 Athens Olympics. The following year he competed in the 100 and 200 m at the World Championships, but failed to reach either final.

In early 2006 he finished fifth at the World Indoor Championships and second at the Commonwealth Games. He then established a new African record with 9.85 seconds from the Doha Grand Prix in May, breaking Frankie Fredericks' old record of 9.86 s from 1996, Fasuba's run was remarkable as he is almost a foot shorter than many other sprinters, he is thought to have one of the fastest footspeeds in athletics. Despite having injury problems throughout the season, Fasuba defended his regional title at the 2006 African Championships. For his 2006 achievements, the Athletics Federation of Nigeria chose him as the Nigerian Male Athlete of the Year.

He won two gold medals at the 2007 All-Africa Games, winning in the 100 m and 4 × 100 m relay. However, the occasion was marred by calls for him to be banned from the Nigerian team following a misunderstanding: Fasuba had planned to celebrate with the Nigerian flag but he had to abandon the celebration after he was called to take a drugs test. On 26 August 2007, he finished fourth in the 100 m at the 2007 World Championships with 10.07 s. Fasuba won the World Indoor Championships 60 m sprint on 8 March 2008 in a time of 6.51 s. At the 2008 Summer Olympics in Beijing he competed at the 100 m and placed second in his heat after Tyson Gay in a time of 10.29 s. He qualified for the second round in which he improved his time to 10.21 seconds. However, he was unable to qualify for the semi-finals as he finished in fourth place after Richard Thompson, Gay and Martial Mbandjock.

Fasuba was entered into the 100 m at the 2009 World Championships, but his performance was modest and he was eliminated in the second round after running 10.25 seconds. After a poor start to 2010, he was not selected to defend his 60 m title at the 2010 IAAF World Indoor Championships as Sunday Bada of the Athletic Federation of Nigeria stated he was not in form.

== Personal life ==
Fasuba is the first child of Olumide and Evelyn Fasuba, and has a younger brother (Kayode) and a younger sister (Yinka). He met Ngozi Nwokocha, a 400 metres runner, at his first national athletics training camp in 2003 and they are now married They have 1 daughter, who is in training to be a sprinter. In 2025 she broke the girl’s under 15 200m record as a 13 year old. The family resides in Plymouth

== Military career ==
In April 2011 Olusoji joined the Royal Navy applying through the Royal Navy Careers Office in Oxford, and embarked on a career as Logistician (Supply Chain) Rating. He hopes to continue with athletics as a hobby and compete for the Royal Navy. He stated that the reason behind this was that he was looking for a more settled life for his family. Now a fully qualified Logistician.

== Achievements ==
Last updated April 2009

Having beaten Frank Fredericks' previous mark, Fasuba was the 100 m African record holder with 9.85 s until Akani Simbine, of South Africa, broke it with 9.84 in 2021; followed by Ferdinand Omanyala, of Kenya, lowering it to 9.77 later that year. Furthermore, this places him as the joint-twentieth fastest 100 m runner ever and the fifth-fastest runner outside of the NACAC area behind Omanyala, Marcell Jacobs, Su Bingtian, and Simbine. He also has the fourth fastest time by an African runner in the 60 metres with 6.49 s; only Leonard Myles-Mills, fellow Nigerian Deji Aliu, and Morne Nagel have run faster.

=== Personal bests ===
| Event | Time (seconds) | Location | Date |
|---|---|---|---|
| 50 metres | 5.76 s | Liévin, France | 28 February 2004 |
| 60 metres | 6.49 s | Stuttgart, Germany | 3 February 2007 |
| 100 metres | 9.85 s | Doha, Qatar | 12 May 2006 |
| 200 metres | 20.52 s | Brussels, Belgium | 3 September 2004 |

- All information taken from IAAF profile.
