= Idrissa Sanou =

Burkinabé sprinter

Personal information
- Nationality: Burkinabé
- Born: 12 June 1977 (age 49) Burkina Faso
- Height: 188 cm (6 ft 2 in)
- Weight: 88 kg (194 lb)

Sport
- Sport: Athletics
- Events: 100 metres, 200 metres, 4 × 100 metres relay

Achievements and titles
- Personal bests: 100 m: 10.16 s (2002); 200 m:
Medal record
Men's athletics
Representing Burkina Faso
Islamic Solidarity Games
Silver medal – second place	2005 Makkah	100 m
African Championships
Silver medal – second place	2004 Brazzaville	100 m
Bronze medal – third place	2002 Radès	100 m

Idrissa Sanou (born 12 June 1977) is a Burkinabé athlete specializing in the 100 metres. Sanou holds the national records in both 100 metres, 200 metres and 4 x 100 metres relay.

Sanou won a bronze medal at the 2002 African Championships in Radès, and a silver medal two years later in Brazzaville. Participating in the 2004 Summer Olympics in Athens, he achieved fourth place in his 100 metres heat, thus qualifying on due to time to the second round where he lost the race. He finished seventh at the 2006 African Championships and fourth at the 2008 African Championships. Sanou represented Burkina Faso at the 2008 Summer Olympics in Beijing. He competed at the 100 metres sprint and placed 6th in his heat without advancing to the second round. He ran the distance in a time of 10.63 seconds.

== Competition record ==
Year	Competition	Venue	Position	Event	Notes
Representing Burkina Faso
1999	All-Africa Games	Johannesburg, South Africa	28th (h)	100 m	10.67
2000	Olympic Games	Sydney, Australia	61st (h)	100 m	10.60
2001	World Indoor Championships	Lisbon, Portugal	39th (h)	60 m	6.95
2001	Jeux de la Francophonie	Ottawa, Canada	19th (qf)	100 m	10.54
2001	World Championships	Edmonton, Canada	48th (h)	100 m	10.60
2001	Universiade	Beijing, China	15th (sf)	100 m	10.55
2002	African Championships	Radès, Tunisia	3rd	100 m	10.16 (w)
2003	World Indoor Championships	Birmingham, United Kingdom	31st (h)	60 m	6.77
2003	World Championships	Paris, France	37th (h)	100 m	10.42
2003	All-Africa Games	Abuja, Nigeria	8th	100 m	10.57
2004	African Championships	Brazzaville, Republic of the Congo	2nd	100 m	10.37
2004	Olympic Games	Athens, Greece	38th (qf)	100 m	10.43
2005	Islamic Solidarity Games	Mecca, Saudi Arabia	2nd	100 m	10.27
2005	World Championships	Helsinki, Finland	31st (qf)	100 m	10.80
2005	Jeux de la Francophonie	Niamey, Niger	1st	100 m	10.48
2005	Jeux de la Francophonie	Niamey, Niger	9th (h)	200 m	21.64
2005	Jeux de la Francophonie	Niamey, Niger	5th	4 × 100 m relay	40.51
2006	African Championships	Bambous, Mauritius	7th	100 m	10.86
2007	All-Africa Games	Algiers, Algeria	4th	100 m	10.39
2007	All-Africa Games	Algiers, Algeria	7th	4 × 100 m relay	40.17 (NR)
2007	World Championships	Osaka, Japan	39th (h)	100 m	10.61
2008	World Indoor Championships	Valencia, Spain	40th (h)	60 m	7.03
2008	African Championships	Addis Ababa, Ethiopia	4th	100 m	10.41
2008	Olympic Games	Beijing, China	56th (h)	100 m	10.63
2009	World Championships	Berlin, Germany	64th (h)	100 m	10.74
2009	Jeux de la Francophonie	Beirut, Lebanon	21st (sf)	100 m	10.71 (w)
2009	Jeux de la Francophonie	Beirut, Lebanon	1st	4 × 100 m relay	39.57 (NR)
