= Michael Frater =

Jamaican sprinter (born 1982)

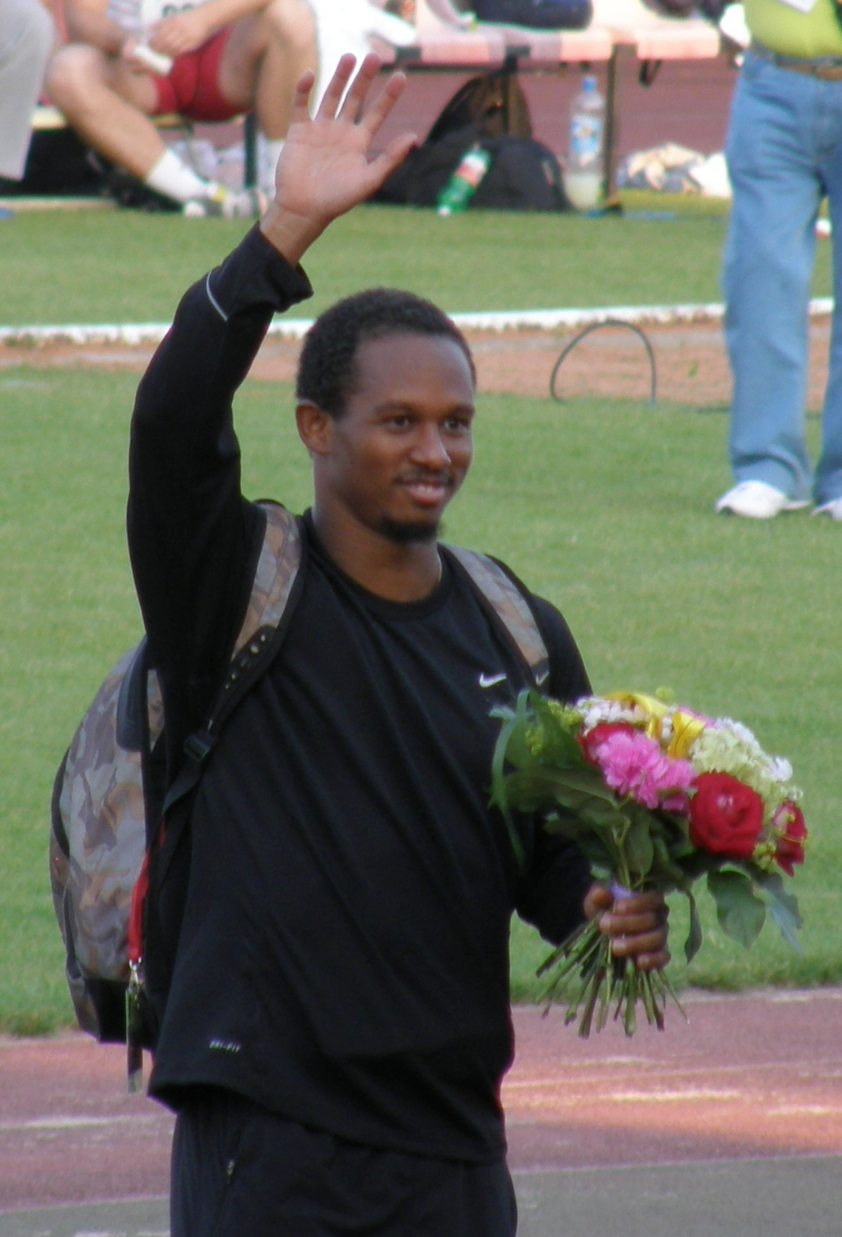
- Frater at the 2010 Janusz Kusocinski Memorial

Personal information
- Born: 6 October 1982 (age 44) Manchester, Jamaica
- Height: 1.75 m (5 ft 9 in)
- Weight: 78 kg (172 lb)

Sport
- Sport: Professional Sprinter
- Events: 100 metres, 200 metres
- College team: TCU Horned Frogs
- Club: Racers Track Club

Achievements and titles
- Personal bests: 60 m: 6.62 (Liévin 2012); 100 m: 9.88 (Lausanne 2012); 200 m: 20.63 (Louisville 2002); 400 m: 49.13 (Kingston 2007)
Medal record
Representing Jamaica
Olympic Games
Gold medal – first place	2012 London	4 × 100 m relay
Disqualified	2008 Beijing	4 × 100 m relay
World Championships
Gold medal – first place	2009 Berlin	4 × 100 m relay
Gold medal – first place	2011 Daegu	4 × 100 m relay
Silver medal – second place	2005 Helsinki	100 metres
Commonwealth Games
Gold medal – first place	2006 Melbourne	4 × 100 m relay
Silver medal – second place	2002 Manchester	4 × 100 m relay
Pan American Games
Gold medal – first place	2003 Santo Domingo	100 metres
Bronze medal – third place	2003 Santo Domingo	4 × 100 m relay

Michael Frater O.D (born 6 October 1982) is a Jamaican retired sprinter who specialised in the 100 metres event. He won a silver medal at the 2005 World Championships and a gold medal at the 2003 Pan American Games for the event.

He has also been successful as part of the Jamaican 4 × 100 metres relay team, setting the world record and Olympic record at the 2012 London Olympics and 2008 Beijing Olympics. He also won gold in the relay at the 2006 Commonwealth Games and took silver in the 2002 edition.

== Career ==
Born on 6 October 1982, in Manchester, Jamaica, Michael Frater is the second of three sons of Lyndell Frater, member of Jamaican Parliament, and Monica Frater. He attended the Ulster Spring primary school with brothers Lindel and Ricardo. His elder brother Lindel, was a sprinter who represented Jamaica at the 2000 Olympic Games. Frater stated that his brother was a major influence on his decision to become a track athlete.

Frater attended Texas Christian University in Fort Worth, Texas. He is a member of the MVP (Maximising Velocity and Power) Track & Field Club based at the University of Technology, Jamaica (U-Tech), Kingston, and is coached by Stephen Francis.

=== 1997 ===
Representing Wolmer's Boys School, Frater set two records at the Inter-Secondary School Sports Association National Boys & Girls Athletic Championship held at the National Stadium, Kingston. On 22 March, he won the Class 3 100 metres in 11.10 and the Class 3 200 metres in 22.73.

Frater won gold at the CARIFTA Games, winning the Under-17 100 m in 11.07.

=== 1998 ===
Frater won a bronze medal at the CARIFTA Games. Competing in the Under-17 100 m he recorded 10.85 into a −0.7 m/s headwind. He also won a silver medal in the 4 × 100 m relay event.

=== 1999 ===
On 9 July Frater won a silver medal in the 4 × 100 metres relay at the Pan American Junior Championships. He ran the second leg for Jamaica, who finished in 40.27 behind the United States team.

Eight days later Frater won a gold medal at the World Youth Championships. He ran the second leg on the 4 × 100 m relay, the team's winning time 40.03 setting a new World Youth (under 18) record.

=== 2000 ===
Frater finished second in the 100 m with 10.50 at the Jamaica National Junior Championships on 30 June.

Running for Boyd Anderson High School in Lauderdale Lakes, Florida, he won the Florida state championship in the 100 m, and was selected as the Gatorade Outstanding High School Track Athlete for the state.

In October, Frater finished fifth in the 100 m at the IAAF World Junior Championships in a personal best 10.46 and again fifth when running the first leg of the 4 × 100 m relay in 40.07.

=== 2002 ===
Frater won the 100 m at the Conference USA Outdoor Championships in 10.07. Although wind aided +2.1 m/s the time is credited as a meet record, with the "(w-a)" notation for wind assistance. In the preliminaries of the 200 m Frater ran a personal best 20.63 (wind +0.6 m/s). He won the 200 m at the same event, in 20.45 Again wind assisted (+3.0 m/s), the time is credited as a meet record, with the "(w-a)" notation for wind assistance. Frater collected his third win of the meet when TCU won the 4 × 100 m relay in 39.17, setting another meet record.

On 1 June Frater finished fourth in the 100 m at the NCAA Division I Outdoor Championships, running 10.40 in a −2.7 headwind.

In July at the Commonwealth Games in Manchester Frater finished seventh in semi-final 1 of the 100 m event. He then ran the first leg of the Jamaican 4 × 100 m relay team that won a silver medal, the Jamaican team finishing with the same time as England, in 38.62 s.

=== 2003 ===
In February Frater ran 6.66 at the Conference USA Indoor Championships, bettering the previous meet record while finishing second in the 60 m. He also finished second in the 200 m.

Frater finished third in the 100 m at the NCAA Division I Outdoor Track & Field Championships, earning all-American honors.

In early August at the Pan American Games, Frater finished second in the 100 m in 10.21 He ran the first leg of the 4 × 100 m relay; the Jamaican team finished fourth recording 39.08. Frater was awarded the gold medal for the 100 m and the bronze for the 4 × 100 m relay a week later when American Mickey Grimes tested positive for the stimulant ephedrine, resulting in the disqualification of Grimes and the US relay team.

Three weeks later at the World Championships in Paris, Frater was eliminated, running in the quarter finals of the 100 m heat immediately following Jon Drummond's on-track protest for disqualification, finishing sixth posting 10.25. He helped the 4 × 100 m relay team qualify second quickest for the final, running the third leg in the semi-final. In the final the baton exchange was not executed cleanly between Dwight Thomas and Frater, resulting in a DNF for the team.

=== 2004 ===
In May Frater won the 100 m at the Conference USA Outdoor Championships in 10.20. TCU won the 4 × 100 m relay, giving Frater his second win of the meet.

On 12 June Frater finished second in 10.059 to Tyson Gay 10.051 at the NCAA Division 1 Outdoor Track & Field Championships at the University of Texas. As a member of the TCU relay team he finished fourth in the 4 × 100 m event.

Frater was knocked out in the first semi-final of the 100 m sprint at the 2004 Athens Olympics, finishing sixth in 10.29 into a −1.6 m/s headwind. He ran the anchor leg on the 4 × 100 m relay in the heats, but did not get the chance to run for a medal as the Jamaican team failed to qualify for the final, with a season best 38.71 fourth-place finish in their heat.

=== 2005 ===
On 16 July Frater won the Meeting de Madrid IAAF Grand Prix event, recording 10.22 into a −0.7 m/s headwind.

In the 2005 World Championships, he won the silver medal in the 100 m with 10.05, finishing second to American Justin Gatlin, who was subsequently banned from competition in 2006 for four years after testing positive for testosterone or its precursor. The Jamaican 4 × 100 m relay team, anchored by Frater, failed to gain a medal in the final, finishing fourth by .001 to the Great Britain and Northern Ireland team.

Although he qualified for the 100 m at the 2005 World Athletics Final in Monaco, Frater did not start the race.

=== 2006 ===
Frater was disqualified in the semi-finals of the 100 m sprint because of a false start at the Commonwealth Games in March. Patrick Johnson was charged with the first false start, which put the entire field under caution. Frater was removed from the field after the second false start, although he had a slower reaction, officially 0.146, to the gun than Jacey Harper in Lane 7. After a third false start Mark Lewis-Francis was also disqualified from the semi-final. Frater ran the first leg of the 4 × 100 m relay, earning a gold medal with Jamaica's winning time of 38.36.

Frater withdrew from competing in the Jamaica International Invitational on 6 May, his coach citing financial issues and "disrespect"

In June, Frater won the 100 m in 10.18 at the JAAA National Championships, succeeding Asafa Powell as Jamaica National Champion. He and his brother Lindel are the only brothers to win the 100 m event at the national championships.

=== 2007 ===
Frater, 10.13, finished second to Darrel Brown, 10.02, of Trinidad at the Jamaica International Invitational on 5 May.

In June at the National Championships on a day highlighted by Veronica Campbell-Brown's emphatic victory in the female 100 m in a world-leading time of 10.89, Frater failed to qualify for the Osaka World Championships when he clocked a less than impressive 10.46. His only chance was left up to the final semi-final of the day but the exploits of talented schoolboy Yohan Blake (10.19) pushed Nesta Carter to run a blistering 10.17 thus making the third heat the fastest heat of the day. This meant that the World Championships silver medalist was out of the finals and as a result did not make the Jamaican team to Osaka.

On 28 July Frater clocked 9.95 at the 4th Gran Premio Internacional de Atletismo Gobierno de Aragon held in Zaragoza, Spain. The wind for the race was an illegal 3.7 m/s.

Frater finished third in the 100 m at the 2007 World Athletics Final, Stuttgart, in 10.11

=== 2008 ===
On 28 June 2008, Frater finished third in the Jamaica National Championships (behind Usain Bolt 9.85, Asafa Powell 9.97) in 10.04, and qualified for the 2008 Olympics in Beijing.

He finished sixth in the Olympic 100 m final setting a personal best of 9.97 seconds.

Frater won a gold medal in Beijing, running the second leg of the 4 × 100 m relay. The relay team of Carter, Frater, Bolt and Powell set a new world record of 37.10, with Frater recording a split time of 9.01 seconds for his leg. (USATF High Performance Registered Split Analysis). The gold medal was later rescinded by the IOC on 25 January 2017, after a retest of Frater's teammate Nesta Carter found the presence of the prohibited substance methylhexaneamine.

In a Jamaican sweep of the medal positions led by Asafa Powell and Nesta Carter, Frater again finished third in the 100 m at the World Athletics Final, Stuttgart, in 10.10

One week later Frater won the 100 m at the Shanghai Golden Grand Prix on 20 September, the first official event of the IAAF 2009 Grand Prix series.

Frater was honoured in a homecoming celebration in Jamaica and received an Order of Distinction (Officer Rank) in recognition of his achievements at the Olympics.

=== 2009 ===
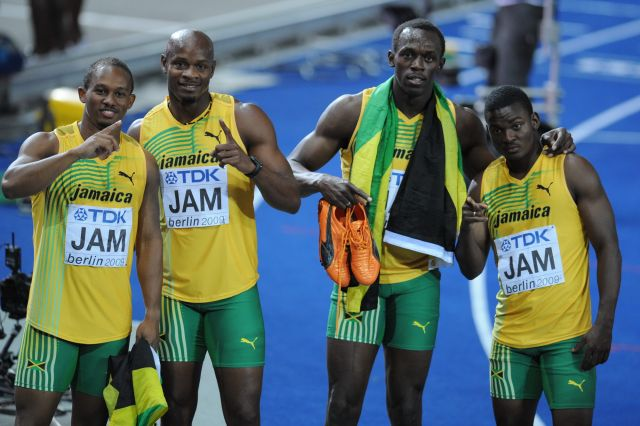
Frater (left) celebrating the world championship relay victory with his teammates

Frater ran the second leg for his MVP 4 × 100 m relay team at the Milo Western Relays held at the GC Foster College on 14 February. The team recorded a new meet record and world leading time of 38.72 s for the relay event.

On 7 March, Frater was inducted into the Boyd Anderson Ring of Honor.

On 16 April Frater was nominated for the Laureus World Team of the Year award, as a member of the 2008 Jamaica Olympic Sprint Team. Two days later Frater ran a leg of the 4 × 100 m at the UTech Track and Field Classic at the National Stadium in Kingston, Jamaica. The teams winning 38.46 clocking was a new meet record. Frater also ran the 200 m at the event, finishing fourth in 20.96

Frater next competed at the Penn Relays on 25 April. He ran the second leg of the 4 × 100 m relay. Asafa Powell on the fourth leg pulled up and finished ninth in 41.24 A report in the Jamaica Observer on the morning of the event indicated that Powell had injured his ankle in training and was not expected to run.

At the Guadeloupe International Invitational On 1 May, Frater placed third in the 100 m in 10.39 On 8 May he finished second in 10.15 at the Qatar Athletic Super Grand Prix. He finished eighth at the Reebok Grand Prix held in New York City at Icahn Stadium on 30 May. At the Prefontaine Classic eight days later he finished sixth.

Frater showed a spectacular return to form at the Jamaica National Trials, finishing third in the 100 m in 10.02 (−0.2 m/s wind), qualifying for the World Championships in Berlin.

=== 2010 ===
In a surprise upset at the National Championships, Frater was beaten into second place in the 100 m final.

Following the National Championships Frater did not compete in the IAAF Diamond League events.

=== 2011 ===
A Gleaner newspaper report revealed that Frater had suffered a ruptured knee ligament in 2010.

=== 2012 ===
As part of the Jamaican 4 × 100 metres relay team, setting the world record and Olympic record on 11 August 2012, at the 2012 London Olympics. Frater ran the second leg, and his split was timed at 8.9 seconds, only surpassed that night by Usain Bolt's 8.8 seconds on the anchor leg.

== Accomplishments and major competition results ==
=== Personal bests ===
Event	Time (seconds)	Venue	Date
60 metres	6.64	Ames, Iowa, United States	1 March 2002
100 metres	9.88	Lausanne, Switzerland	30 June 2011
200 metres	20.63	Louisville, United States	9 May 2002

=== Competition record ===
==== 100 metres ====
Event	Result (Pos)	City	Date
1997 CARIFTA Games	1st Final	Bridgetown	, 1997
1998 CARIFTA Games	3rd Final	Port of Spain	, 1998
2000 IAAF World Junior Championships	5th Final	Santiago de Chile	18 October 2000
2003 Pan American Games	1st Final	Santo Domingo	6 August 2003
2004 Olympic Games	6th Semi-Final	Athens	22 August 2004
2005 IAAF World Championships	2nd Final	Helsinki	7 August 2005
2005 IAAF World Athletics Final	D.N.S. Final	Monaco	10 September 2005
2006 Commonwealth Games	DQ Semi-Final	Melbourne	25 March 2006
2007 IAAF World Athletics Final	3rd Final	Stuttgart	22 September 2007
2008 Olympic Games	6th Final	Beijing	16 August 2008
2008 IAAF World Athletics Final	3rd Final	Stuttgart	13 September 2008
2009 World Championships	5th Semi-Final	Berlin	16 August 2009
2009 IAAF World Athletics Final	2nd Final	Thessaloniki	12 September 2009

==== 4 × 100 metres relay ====
Event	Result	City	Date
1998 CARIFTA Games	2nd Final	Port of Spain	, 1998
1999 Pan American Junior Games	2nd Final	Tampa	11 July 1999
1999 World Youth Championships	1st Final	Bydgoszcz	17 July 1999
2002 Commonwealth Games	2nd Final	Manchester	31 July 2002
2003 Pan American Games	3rd Final	Santo Domingo	6 August 2003
2003 World Championships	DQ Final	Paris	31 August 2003
2004 Olympic Games	4th Semi-Final	Athens	22 August 2004
2005 World Championships	4th Final	Helsinki	13 August 2005
2006 Commonwealth Games	1st Final	Melbourne	25 March 2006
2008 Olympic Games	DQ Final	Beijing	22 August 2008
2009 World Championships	1st Final	Berlin	22 August 2009
2012 Olympic Games	1st Final	London	11 August 2012

==== Time progression in the 100 m ====
Year	Time	Windspeed	City	Date
2000	10.46	0.10	Santiago de Chile	18 October
2001	10.26	1.60	Arlington	5 May
2002	10.21	0.50	Louisville	9 May
2003	10.13	1.10	Lincoln	30 May
2004	10.06	1.70	Austin	1 June
2005	10.03	1.60	Athens	14 June
2006	10.06	1.50	Gateshead	11 June
2007	10.03	0.00	Rieti	9 September
2008	9.97	0.00	Beijing	16 August
2009	10.02	−0.20	Kingston	27 June
2010	9.98	0.90	Rieti	28 August
2011	9.88	1.00	Lausanne	30 June
2012	9.94	1.10	Kingston	29 June
2014	10.44	−0.10	Lausanne	3 July
2015	10.14	1.00	Kingston	25 June

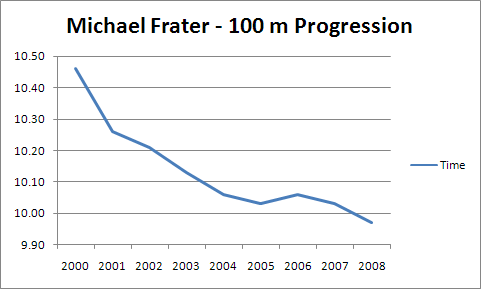
The progression of Frater's 100 m seasons' best times, till 2008
