= Harmon Harmon =

Cook Island sprinter

Harmon Harmon (born 15 May 1980) is a sprint athlete, who competes for the Cook Islands.

Harmon competed at the 2004 Summer Olympics in the 100 metres he ran in a time off 11.22 seconds and finished 8th in his heat, so didn't qualify for the next round. He also represented the Cook Islands at the 2002 Commonwealth Games.

Harmon has a master's degree from Auckland University of Technology, completed in 2017.
