= Tamunosiki Atorudibo =

Nigerian sprinter

Personal information
- Nationality: Nigerian
- Born: 21 March 1985 (age 41) Okrika, Rivers State, Nigeria
- Height: 1.76 m (5 ft 9 in)
- Weight: 74 kg (163 lb)

Sport
- Sport: Running

Achievements and titles
- Personal bests: 100m: 10.07; 200m: 20.99
Medal record
Men's athletics
Representing Nigeria
Afro-Asian Games
Silver medal – second place	2003 Gachibowli	100 m

Tamunosiki Atorudibo (born 21 March 1985) is a Nigerian sprinter who specialised in the 100 metres.

Atorudibo held the World youth record over 100 metres until 2012, having bettered Darrel Brown's record over 10.24

Records
Preceded by (Trinidad and Tobago) Darrel Brown	Boys' World Youth Best Holder, 100 metres 23 March 2002 – 5 October 2012	Succeeded by (Japan) Yoshihide Kiryū
