= Wilfried Bingangoye =

Gabonese sprinter (born 1985)

Personal information
- Born: Wilfried Bingangoye; March 25, 1985 (age 41) Omye
- Height: 1.74 m (5 ft 9 in)
- Weight: 76 kg (168 lb)

Sport
- Country: Gabon
- Sport: Athletics
- Event: 100 metres
- Updated on 5 August 2012

Wilfried Bingangoye (born March 25, 1985) is a Gabonese sprinter, specializing in the 100 metres. His personal best time is 10.34 seconds, achieved in August 2009 in Castres.

Participating in the 2004 Summer Olympics, he achieved eighth place in his 100 metres heat, failing to secure qualification to the second round. He did however run his then personal best time of 10.76 seconds. He also competed at the World Championships in 2005, 2007, and 2009. He finished sixth at the 2008 African Championships. Participating in the 2008 Summer Olympics, he achieved sixth place in his 100 metres heat, failing to secure qualification to the second round. At the 2012 Summer Olympics, he finished third in his preliminary round heat, failing to progress further. At the 2016 Summer Olympics, he finished fifth in his preliminary round heat, and did not advance. Bingangoye has not recorded further competitive results in major international meets.

== Competitions Record ==
Year	Competition	Venue	Position	Event	Time
2004	2004 Summer Olympics	Athens, Greece	8th (prelim. heat)	100m	10.76
2005	IAAF World Championships	Helsinki, Finland	7th (heat)	100m	10.86 (SB)
2007	IAAF World Championships	Osaka, Japan	5th (heat)	100m	10.53
2008	African Championships	Addis Ababa, Ethiopia	6th	100m	10.54
2008	2008 Summer Olympics	Beijing, China	6th (prelim. heat)	100m	10.87
2009	IAAF World Championships	Berlin, Germany	60th	100m	10.62
2012	2012 Summer Olympics	London, United Kingdom	3rd (prelim. heat)	100m	10.89
2016	2016 Summer Olympics	Rio de Janeiro, Brazil	5th (prelim. heat)	100m	11.03
