= Abraham Morlu =

Liberian gridiron football player (born 1981)

Profile
- Position: Wide receiver

Personal information
- Born: 1 May 1981 (age 45); Liberia
- Listed height: 6 ft 1 in (1.85 m)
- Listed weight: 210 lb (95 kg)

Career information
- College: Charlotte

Career history
- 2005: Charlotte Stars
- 2008: Winnipeg Blue Bombers*
- 2009: Toronto Argonauts*
- * Offseason or practice squad member only
- Stats at CFL.ca

Abraham Koiyan Morlu (born 1 May 1981) is a Liberian former football wide receiver. He was signed as a street free agent by the Charlotte Stars in 2008. Morlu was also a member of the Winnipeg Blue Bombers and Toronto Argonauts.

Morlu has also competed in track and field, representing his birth country Liberia. He specialized in the sprints, and competed internationally at the 2010 World Indoor Championships without reaching the final. He also competed in the 4 x 100 metres relay at the 2000 Olympic Games, the 2001 World Championships and the 2003 World Championships.
