= Yves Sonan =

Ivorian sprinter

Personal information
- Nationality: Ivorian
- Born: 1 May 1978 (age 48)

Sport
- Sport: Sprinting
- Event: 4 × 100 metres relay

Yves Sonan (born 1 May 1978) is an Ivorian sprinter. He competed in the men's 4 × 100 metres relay at the 2000 Summer Olympics.
