= Eric Nkansah =

Ghanaian sprinter (born 1974)

Medal record

Men's athletics

Representing Ghana

African Championships
Silver medal – second place	2008 Addis Ababa	4×100 m
Bronze medal – third place	2006 Bambous	100 m
Bronze medal – third place	2006 Bambous	4×100 m

Eric Nkansah Appiah (born December 12, 1974) is a Ghanaian athlete specializing in the 100 metres.

He is one of the current national record holders in 4 × 100 m relay with 38,12 seconds, achieved at the 1997 World Championships in Athens where the Ghanaian team finished fifth in the final.

Participating in the 2004 Summer Olympics, he achieved sixth place in his 100 metres heat, thus missing out on a placing in Round 2 of the event. He won a bronze medal at the 2006 African Championships

His personal best time is 10.00 seconds, first achieved in June 1999 in Nuremberg. The Ghanaian record currently belongs to Leonard Myles-Mills with 9.98 seconds.
