= Éric Pacôme N'Dri =

Ivorian sprinter (born 1978)

Personal information
- Nationality: Ivorian
- Born: Éric Pacôme N'Dri; 24 March 1978
Medal record
Men's athletics
Representing Ivory Coast
African Championships
Gold medal – first place	1998 Dakar	4×100 m

Éric Pacôme N'Dri (born 24 March 1978) is an Ivorian athlete specializing in the 100 metres.

Participating in the 2004 Summer Olympics, he achieved third place in his 100 metres heat, thus securing qualification to the second round. He then achieved eighth place in his second round heat, thus failing to secure qualification to the semi-finals. He also competed at the World Championships in 2001 and 2003. N'Dri has won two medals in 100 metres at the Jeux de la Francophonie; a bronze medal in 2001 and a silver medal in 2005.

N'Dri co-holds the national 4 x 100 metres relay record of 38.60 seconds, achieved with teammates Ibrahim Meité, Ahmed Douhou and Yves Sonan at the 2001 World Championships in Edmonton.
