= Deji Aliu =

Nigerian sprinter

Personal information
- Born: 22 November 1975 (age 50) Lagos, Nigeria

Sport
- Sport: Track and field
Medal record
Representing Nigeria
Olympic Games
Bronze medal – third place	2004 Athens	4x100 m relay
World Championships
Disqualified	1999 Seville	4x100 m relay
All-Africa Games
Gold medal – first place	2003 Abuja	100 m

Deji Aliu (born 22 November 1975) is a Nigerian sprinter. He won the 100 metres event at the 2003 All-Africa Games. He also took fourth place in the event at the 2002 Commonwealth Games.

Aliu formed part of the Nigerian relay team which won a bronze medal at the 2004 Olympics. Together with Innocent Asonze, Francis Obikwelu and Daniel Effiong . He won a bronze medal in 4 x 100 metres relay at the 1999 World Championships in Athletics, but the team was later disqualified (in August 2005) because Innocent Asonze failed a doping test in June 1999.

== Personal bests ==
- 100 metres – 9.95 (2003)
- 200 metres – 20.25 (2002)
