= 2010 London Grand Prix =

- Dates: 13–14 August 2010
- Host city: London, England
- Venue: Crystal Palace National Sports Centre
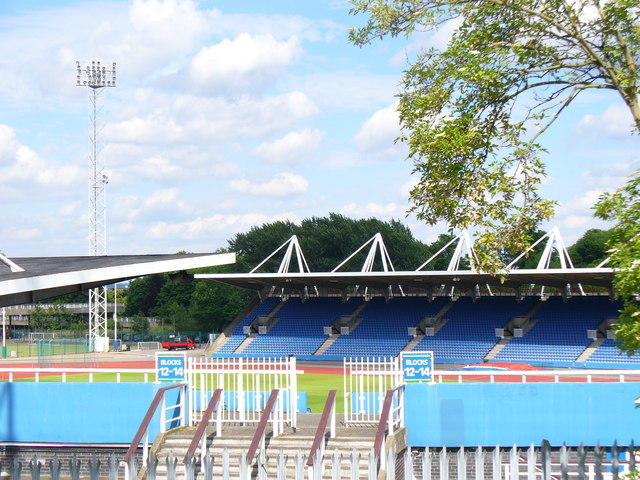
- Level: 2010 IAAF Diamond League
- Events: 40 (27 Diamond League)

The 2010 London Grand Prix was the 58th edition of the annual outdoor track and field meeting in London, England. Held from 13–14 August at the Crystal Palace National Sports Centre, it was the twelfth leg of the inaugural IAAF Diamond League – the highest level international track and field circuit. 40 events were contested with 27 of them being point-scoring Diamond League events.

Rain fell both days and temperatures were described as "cold" by the BBC. Despite this, 2008 Paralympics champion Oscar Pistorius for South Africa, running in the men's T44 (below knee amputee) 400 metres event, set a new world record with a time of 47.04 seconds. Though the time was slower than his personal best set in Italy in July of the same year, 46.02 seconds, his personal best had not been run in an International Paralympic Committee sanctioned race, making his 47.04 seconds race on 14 August the official world record.

Meet organisers hoped to stage a competition between the three fastest men in the world—Usain Bolt, Tyson Gay, and Asafa Powell—in the men's 100 metres. However, Bolt declined to participate, claiming he would lose more money than he would make because of British taxes, and Powell withdrew the day before the race with injuries to his hamstring and back. With Bolt and Powell absent, Gay won in a world leading time of 9.78 seconds ahead of Yohan Blake, who finished second behind Gay in a personal best time of 9.89 seconds. Gay's time was also a stadium and meeting record, and his victory made him the top ranked 100 metres sprinter for the season.

Other notable records in the men's events included a meeting record by Gerd Kanter in the discus throw with a mark of 67.82 metres, and an equalling of the 110 metres hurdles meeting record of 13.06 seconds by David Oliver, originally set by Colin Jackson in 1992.

In the women's events, Priscilla Lopes-Schliep won in a world leading time and meeting record of 12.52 seconds in the 100 metres hurdles, making up a metre deficit from the 50 metres mark to pass Sally Pearson who finished second in a time of 12.61 seconds. Milcah Chemos narrowly held off Yuliya Zarudneva in the 3000 metres steeplechase, winning in 9:22.49 to Zarudneva's 9:22.60, both under the previous meeting record. Allyson Felix doubled in the 200 metres and 400 metres sprints, winning the former by half of a second (22.37 seconds to Debbie Ferguson-McKenzie's 22.88 seconds), and narrowly winning the latter in 50.79 seconds ahead of Tatyana Firova who placed second in 50.84 seconds.

== Diamond League results ==
Top three placers in each scoring event earned four points, two points, and one point for first place, second place, and third place respectively. The athlete with the most points in a Diamond League event (e.g. women's 100 metres) at the end of the season wins the Diamond Trophy for their event.

=== Men ===
| Event | First (+4) | | Second (+2) | | Third (+1) | |
|---|---|---|---|---|---|---|
| 100 m (±0.0 m/s) | Tyson Gay (USA) | 9.78 WL MR | Yohan Blake (JAM) | 9.89 PB | Richard Thompson (TTO) | 10.05 |
| 400 m | Jeremy Wariner (USA) | 44.67 | Jermaine Gonzales (JAM) | 44.80 | Ricardo Chambers (JAM) | 45.18 |
| Mile | Augustine Choge (KEN) | 3:50.14 PB | Mekonnen Gebremedhin (ETH) | 3:50.35 | Leonel Manzano (USA) | 3:50.64 PB |
| 110 m hurdles (−0.4 m/s) | David Oliver (USA) | 13.06 =MR | Dwight Thomas (JAM) | 13.32 | Garfield Darien (FRA) | 13.34 =PB |
| 400 m hurdles | Bershawn Jackson (USA) | 48.12 | Javier Culson (PUR) | 48.17 | Dai Greene (GBR) | 49.09 |
| 3000 m steeplechase | Paul Kipsiele Koech (KEN) | 8:17.70 | Ezekiel Kemboi (KEN) | 8:19.95 | Brimin Kipruto (KEN) | 8:20.77 |
| Long jump | Dwight Phillips (USA) | 8.18 m (+0.2 m/s) | Morten Jensen (DEN) | 7.96 m (+0.3 m/s) | Chris Tomlinson (GBR) | 7.92 m (+0.7 m/s) |
| Triple jump | Christian Olsson (SWE) | 17.41 m (−0.7 m/s) | Teddy Tamgho (FRA) | 17.27 m (−0.5 m/s) | Alexis Copello (CUB) | 17.02 m (+0.1 m/s) |
| High jump | Ivan Ukhov (RUS) | 2.29 m | Jesse Williams (USA) | 2.27 m | Donald Thomas (BAH) | 2.27 m |
| Pole vault | Łukasz Michalski (POL) | 5.71 m | Derek Miles (USA) | 5.61 m | Przemysław Czerwiński (POL) | 5.51 m |
| Shot put | Reese Hoffa (USA) | 21.44 m | Tomasz Majewski (POL) | 21.20 m | Christian Cantwell (USA) | 20.78 m |
| Discus throw | Gerd Kanter (EST) | 67.82 m MR | Zoltán Kővágó (HUN) | 65.54 m | Virgilijus Alekna (LTU) | 65.33 m |
| Javelin throw | Andreas Thorkildsen (NOR) | 87.38 m | Matthias de Zordo (GER) | 86.97 m | Tero Pitkämäki (FIN) | 84.71 m |

=== Women ===
| Event | First (+4) | | Second (+2) | | Third (+1) | |
|---|---|---|---|---|---|---|
| 200 m (+0.5 m/s) | Allyson Felix (USA) | 22.37 | Debbie Ferguson-McKenzie (BAH) | 22.88 | Sherone Simpson (JAM) | 23.04 |
| 400 m | Allyson Felix (USA) | 50.79 | Tatyana Firova (RUS) | 50.84 | Debbie Dunn (USA) | 50.89 |
| 800 m | Mariya Savinova (RUS) | 1:58.94 | Janeth Jepkosgei (KEN) | 1:59.16 | Jemma Simpson (GBR) | 1:59.26 |
| 1500 m | Nancy Langat (KEN) | 4:07.60 | Lisa Dobriskey (GBR) | 4:09.07 | Erin Donohue (USA) | 4:09.72 |
| 5000 m | Tirunesh Dibaba (ETH) | 14:36.41 | Vivian Cheruiyot (KEN) | 14:38.17 | Sentayehu Ejigu (ETH) | 14:39.24 |
| 100 m hurdles (+0.2 m/s) | Priscilla Lopes-Schliep (CAN) | 12.52 WL MR | Sally Pearson (AUS) | 12.61 | Lolo Jones (USA) | 12.66 |
| 400 m hurdles | Kaliese Spencer (JAM) | 53.78 | Zuzana Hejnová (CZE) | 55.11 | Eilidh Child (GBR) | 55.16 PB |
| 3000 m steeplechase | Milcah Chemos (KEN) | 9:22.49 MR | Yuliya Zarudneva (RUS) | 9:22.60 | Lydia Jebet Rotich (KEN) | 9:23.68 |
| Long jump | Darya Klishina (RUS) | 6.65 m (−0.5 m/s) | Lyudmila Kolchanova (RUS) | 6.65 m (±0.0 m/s) | Hyleas Fountain (USA) | 6.57 m (−0.3 m/s) |
| Triple jump | Yargelis Savigne (CUB) | 14.86 m (+0.7 m/s) | Olga Rypakova (KAZ) | 14.74 m (−0.6 m/s) | Olha Saladukha (UKR) | 14.40 m (+1.3 m/s) |
| High jump | Blanka Vlašić (CRO) | 2.01 m | Ruth Beitia (ESP) | 1.91 m | Irina Gordeyeva (RUS) | 1.91 m |
| Shot put | Nadezhda Ostapchuk (BLR) | 20.27 m | Valerie Adams-Vili (NZL) | 19.83 m | Gong Lijiao (CHN) | 19.26 m |
| Discus throw | Yarelis Barrios (CUB) | 65.62 m | Sandra Perković (CRO) | 63.30 m | Nicoleta Grasu (ROU) | 61.78 m |
| Javelin throw | Barbora Špotáková (CZE) | 63.50 m | Kara Patterson (USA) | 63.41 m | Linda Stahl (GER) | 59.60 m |

== Other results ==
=== Men ===
| Event | First | | Second | | Third | |
|---|---|---|---|---|---|---|
| 200 m (−0.6 m/s) | Wallace Spearmon (USA) | 20.12 | Churandy Martina (AHO) | 20.42 | Jaysuma Saidy Ndure (NOR) | 20.43 |
| 400 m | Conrad Williams (GBR) | 46.09 | Robert Tobin (GBR) | 46.12 | Richard Buck (GBR) | 46.48 |
| 800 m | Abubaker Kaki (SUD) | 1:44.38 | Andrew Wheating (USA) | 1:44.56 PB | Nick Symmonds (USA) | 1:45.28 |
| 3000 m | Bernard Lagat (USA) | 7:40.36 | Mo Farah (GBR) | 7:40.75 | Mark Kosgei Kiptoo (KEN) | 7:41.56 |
| 4×100 m relay | England (ENG): Tremayne Gilling; Jeffrey Lawal-Balogun; Leevan Yearwood; Mark Lewis-Francis | 39.31 | All Stars: Tyron Akins (USA); Aaron Armstrong (TTO); Brian Dzingai (ZIM); Joel Brown (USA) | 39.75 | Scotland (SCO): Nick Smith; Stuart Benson; Ryan Oswald; Calum Innes | 39.88 |
| T44 400 m | Oscar Pistorius (RSA) | 47.04 WR | Ian Jones (GBR) | 51.64 | Richard Whitehead (GBR) | 59.52 |
| T54 1500 m | Marcel Hug (SUI) | 3:14.58 | David Weir (GBR) | 3:15.09 | Richard Colman (AUS) | 3:20.64 |
| Under-20 3000 m | Richard Goodman (GBR) | 8:12.94 PB | Jonny Hay (GBR) | 8:15.96 | John McDonnell (GBR) | 8:16.02 PB |

=== Women ===
| Event | First | | Second | | Third | |
|---|---|---|---|---|---|---|
| 100 m (−0.3 m/s) | Marshevet Myers (USA) | 11.01 | Carmelita Jeter (USA) | 11.06 | Blessing Okagbare (NGR) | 11.10 |
| 800 m | Lenka Masná (CZE) | 2:00.72 | Nikki Hamblin (NZL) | 2:00.96 | Celia Taylor (GBR) | 2:01.16 PB |
| Pole vault | Fabiana Murer (BRA) | 4.46 m | Jillian Schwartz (ISR) | 4.46 m | Kate Dennison (GBR) | 4.46 m |
| T12/T44 100 m (+0.1 m/s) | Libby Clegg (GBR) | 12.72 | April Holmes (USA) | 13.69 | Stefanie Reid (GBR) | 14.09 |
| Under-20 3000 m | Emelia Gorecka (GBR) | 9:27.02 | Beth Potter (GBR) | 9:27.50 | Lily Partidge (GBR) | 9:34.17 PB |

== See also ==
- 2010 Weltklasse Zürich (first half of the Diamond League final)
- 2010 Memorial Van Damme (second half of the Diamond League final)
