= Tyson Gay =

American sprinter (born 1982)

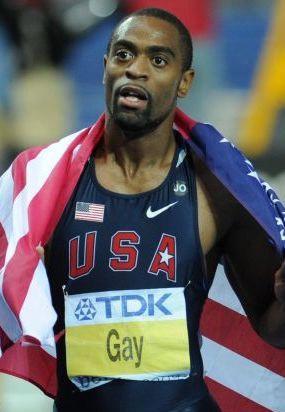
- Gay at the 2009 World Championships

Personal information
- Born: August 9, 1982 (age 44) Lexington, Kentucky, U.S.
- Home town: Clermont, Florida, U.S.
- Education: University of Arkansas
- Height: 5 ft 11 in (181 cm)
- Weight: 176 lb (80 kg)

Sport
- Country: United States
- Sport: Track and field
- Events: 100 m, 200 m, 4 × 100 m relay
- Coached by: John Smith

Achievements and titles
- Personal bests: 100 m: 9.69 NR (Shanghai, 2009); 200 m: 19.58 (New York, 2009); 200 m straight: 19.41 (Manchester, 2010); 400 m: 44.89 (Gainesville, 2010)
Medal record
Men's athletics
Representing the United States
Olympic Games
Disqualified	2012 London	4 × 100 m relay
World Championships
Gold medal – first place	2007 Osaka	100 m
Gold medal – first place	2007 Osaka	200 m
Gold medal – first place	2007 Osaka	4 × 100 m relay
Silver medal – second place	2009 Berlin	100 m
World Cup
Gold medal – first place	2006 Athens	100 m
Gold medal – first place	2006 Athens	4 × 100 m relay
World Relays
Gold medal – first place	2015 Nassau	4 × 100 m relay
World Athletics Final
Gold medal – first place	2005 Monaco	200 m
Gold medal – first place	2006 Stuttgart	200 m
Gold medal – first place	2009 Thessaloniki	100 m
Bronze medal – third place	2006 Stuttgart	100 m
Diamond League Final
Gold medal – first place	2010 Brussels	100 m
NACAC U-25 Championships
Gold medal – first place	2002 San Antonio	4 × 100 m relay
Representing the Americas
Continental Cup
Gold medal – first place	2010 Split	4 × 100 m relay

Tyson Gay (born August 9, 1982) is an American retired track and field sprinter who competed in the 100 and 200 meters. His 100 m personal best of 9.69 seconds is the American record and makes him tied for the second fastest athlete over 100 m ever, along with Yohan Blake of Jamaica.

Gay has won medals in many major international competitions, which include 3 gold medals in the 100 m, 200 m and 4 × 100 m relay at the 2007 Osaka World Championships. This made him the second man to win all three events at the same World Championships, after Maurice Greene (Usain Bolt duplicated the feat two years later). Gay is a four-time U.S. champion in the 100 m.

At the 2008 Olympic Trials, he ran a wind-assisted 9.68 seconds in the 100 m. Days later, he suffered a severe hamstring injury in the 200 m trials and did not win any medals at the Beijing Olympics. He clocked 9.71 seconds to win the 100 m silver medal in the 2009 World Championships — it is the fastest non-winning time in the history of the 100 m.

In July 2013, it was announced that Gay had tested positive for a banned substance; he subsequently withdrew from consideration for the World Championships in Moscow. The United States Anti-Doping Agency (USADA) suspended him until June 23, 2014, and stripped him of his silver medal in the 4 × 100 m relay at the 2012 Summer Olympics.

Gay is a two-time winner of the Jesse Owens Award, was the 2007 IAAF World Athlete of the Year, won Best Track and Field Athlete for Track & Field News in 2007, and won the ESPY Award in 2008 and 2011. He has also achieved multiple Men's season's best performances in the 100 m and 200 m.

== Early life ==
Born on August 9, 1982, in Lexington, Kentucky, Tyson Gay is the only son of Daisy Gay and Greg Mitchell. Athletic prowess was part of his family life; Gay's grandmother ran for Eastern Kentucky University and his mother Daisy also competed in her youth, though she was pregnant with her first child by her early teens. Gay's older sister, Tiffany, was a keen sprinter and had a successful high school career. Gay and Tiffany, encouraged by their mother, raced at every opportunity, training hard at school and on the hills in their neighborhood. There was strong competition between the two, and Gay later said that his sister's quick reaction time inspired him to improve.

== Amateur career ==
Although Gay tended to be a slow starter on the track, he worked hard to improve and broke the Lafayette High School stadium record for the 200 meters. Under the tutelage of Ken Northington, a former 100-yard dash state champion, Gay began working on his technique and rhythm. By his senior year he was a more composed athlete and he focused on the 100 meters, winning the state championship in the event and setting a new championship record of 10.60 s. In spite of this, his mother noted that he was not fully applying himself and was taking his abilities for granted. Gay was also not a studious child and he failed to achieve the grades needed to enter a Division I sports college. However, the Kentucky High School State Championships in June 2001 demonstrated his abilities: he won gold in the 100 m, setting a new personal best and state record with 10.46 s. In the 200 m he took silver with another new personal best of 21.23 s. At a 2001 track event, Gay met trainer Lance Brauman and the college coach convinced him to attend Barton County Community College. It was here that Gay first met Jamaican sprinter Veronica Campbell-Brown, and the two formed a close bond, becoming training partners.

The move to the college in Great Bend, Kansas, marked further progression for Gay: in 2002 his 100 m and 200 m times dropped to 10.08 s and 20.21 s respectively, albeit with wind assistance. He improved upon his legal personal bests too, recording a 100 m run of 10.27 s and 20.88 s in the 200 m. He also continued to outstrip the competition, winning the 100 m at the NJCAA National Championship. Returning to the NJCAA event the following year, with the wind in his favour, Gay took bronze in the 100 m with 10.01 s and silver in the 200 m with 20.31 s. Injuries upset the rest of 2003 for Gay, and his coach Brauman moved on to work as the sprint coach at the University of Arkansas where Gay followed.

=== National debut ===
Gay chose to study sociology and marketing, and the university environment gave the 22-year-old sprinter his first opportunity to compete in NCAA events. At the 2004 NCAA Division I Indoor Track and Field Championships in March, Gay finished fourth in the 60 meters, (Note: In 2009, all of Gay's NCAA performances were vacated due to violations by his coach Lance Brauman.) with 6.63 s, and fifth in the closely fought 200 m with a time of 20.58 s. Gay missed out on second place in the 200 m by only two hundredths of a second. The 2004 NCAA Division I Outdoor Track and Field Championships in June proved far more fruitful, however, as Gay became Arkansas' first 100 m NCAA champion, setting a school record of 10.06 s. Furthermore, his efforts in the event helped the Arkansas athletic team win the NCAA Championship.

The results of Gay's first 2004 US Olympic Trials confirmed his status as a rising contender in the 100 m and 200 m events. Although he did not reach the final of either event, he reached the semis of the highly competitive 100 m and posted a 200 m personal best of 20.07 s in the qualifying stages. A hamstring injury due to dehydration prevented Gay from competing in the 200 m final, but he did not see the trials as a missed opportunity, rather a springboard for future events: "I was really focused upon the team, had a great shot, but it was a learning experience—how to take care of my body." The end of year Track and Field News rankings for United States sprinters showed him to be the eighth fastest 100 m runner and the fourth fastest sprinter over 200 m that year—indicative of his potential, he was younger than all those ranked ahead of him.

In Gay's final year as an amateur athlete he started well, setting a personal best and school record of 6.55 s in the 60 m at the 2005 Championship Series. He helped the university team to another NCAA outdoor victory, setting a new personal best of 19.93 s in the 200 m qualifiers and placing third in the finals. Training partner and friend Wallace Spearmon took first place with 19.91 s—his time and Gay's 19.93 s were the second and third-fastest 200 m times in the world that year. The pair teamed up for the 4 × 100 m relay, along with Michael Grant and Omar Brown, and won with an Arkansas-record-breaking time of 38.49 s. With the NCAA Championships behind him, in June 2005 Gay decided to become a professional athlete, setting his sights on a place in the US 200 m team for the Helsinki World Championships.

== Professional career ==
=== Debut season ===
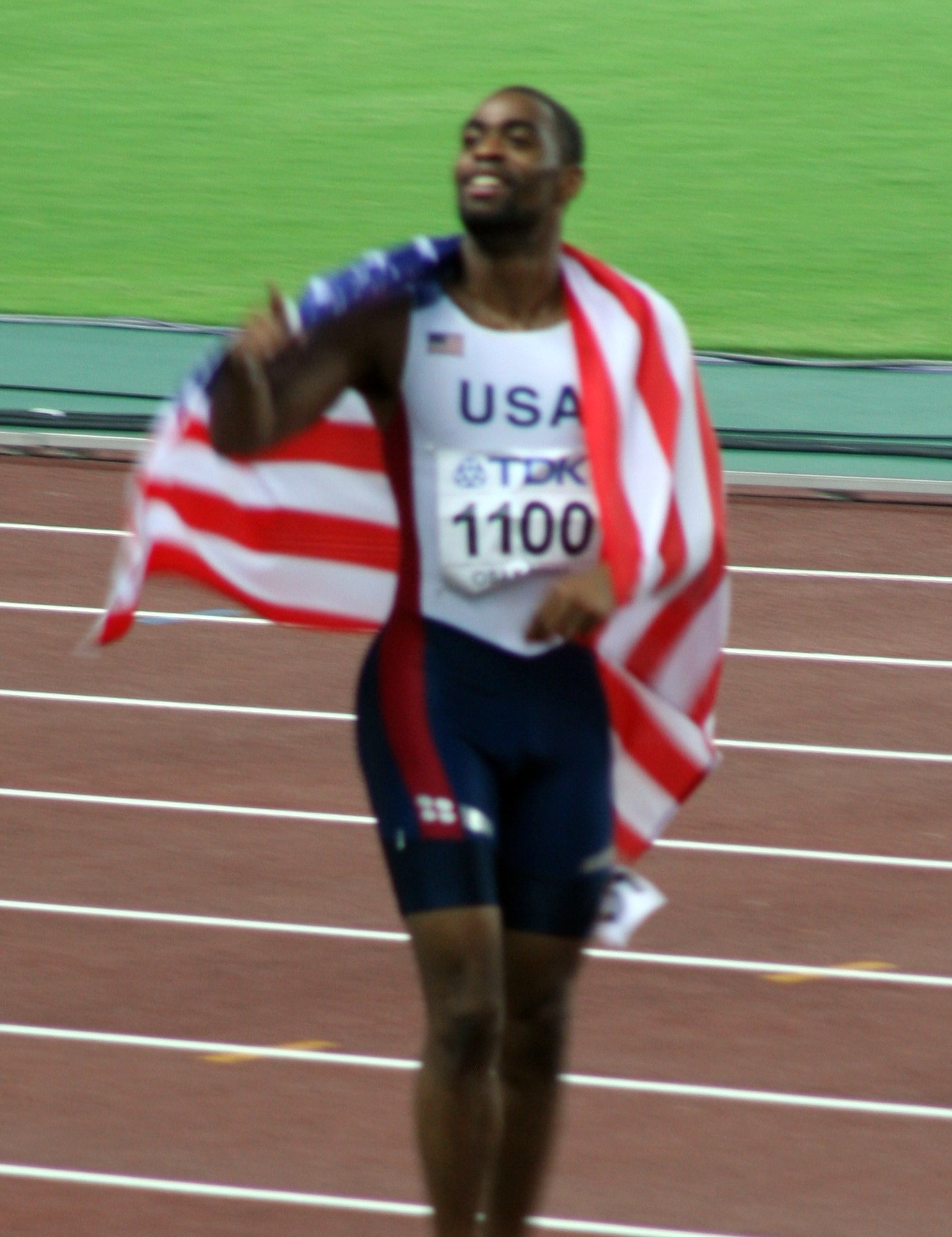
Gay after winning the 100 m at the Osaka World Championships

Upon turning professional, Gay entered the USA Outdoor Championships, where he took silver in the 200 m with 20.06 s. He was selected for the 200 m at the 2005 World Championships in Athletics in Helsinki and finished fourth, beaten by three of his compatriots (Justin Gatlin, Wallace Spearmon and John Capel). This completed the unprecedented feat of a single nation taking the top four positions at the championship event. Gay formed part of the 4 × 100 m relay team but a poor baton exchange between Mardy Scales and Leonard Scott resulted in disqualification. Later in the month, Gay briefly turned his attentions to the 100 m and scored a season's best of 10.08 s at the Rieti Grand Prix.

He ended the 2005 season on a positive note by winning the gold medal in the 200 m at the World Athletics Final, his first major championship title. His time of 19.96 s was his second fastest that year and fourth fastest of any sprinter that season. Although he stated that the quality of the competition and memories of Helsinki had made him nervous beforehand, he went on to beat all three American sprinters he had lost to in the World Championships, becoming the first athlete to beat Gatlin over 200 m that season. It was not only his rival sprinters that would cause future difficulties, however, as Gay's coach Brauman was indicted for various crimes relating to his time at Barton College and the University of Arkansas at Fayetteville. He had helped athletes gain funds and credits that they were not entitled to. Following Gay's testimony, the courts ruled that Brauman was guilty and, as a result, Arkansas' two NCAA titles and all of Gay's college track times were annulled. None of the athletes were charged with any wrongdoing. Although he was imprisoned for 10 months, Brauman continued to train Gay, periodically updating him with coaching routines and techniques.

=== Double event sprinter ===
The 2006 athletics season saw Gay rise to the top of the rankings for the first time and become a genuine contender in the 100 m. He became the 2006 US Outdoor Champion in unfortunate circumstances: Gay originally finished second in 10.07 s with a strong headwind, but Justin Gatlin's first-place finish was later rescinded for use of a banned substance. Gay significantly improved upon his previous 200 m personal best by over two-tenths of a second at the IAAF Grand Prix in Lausanne. However, his time of 19.70 s was not enough to beat newcomer Xavier Carter who ran the second fastest time ever with 19.63 s. Improvements in the 100 m followed, as he won the Rethymno track meet and set another personal best with 9.88 s. Gay scored another sub-10-second 100 m at the Stockholm Grand Prix, finishing second to Asafa Powell with a 9.97 s, and beating Michael Johnson's British all-comers 200 m record with a 19.84 s win in London. Gay continued to improve at the 100 m, revising his personal best to 9.84 s at the Zürich Golden League meet, but it was not enough to beat Powell, who equaled his own world record of 9.77 s.

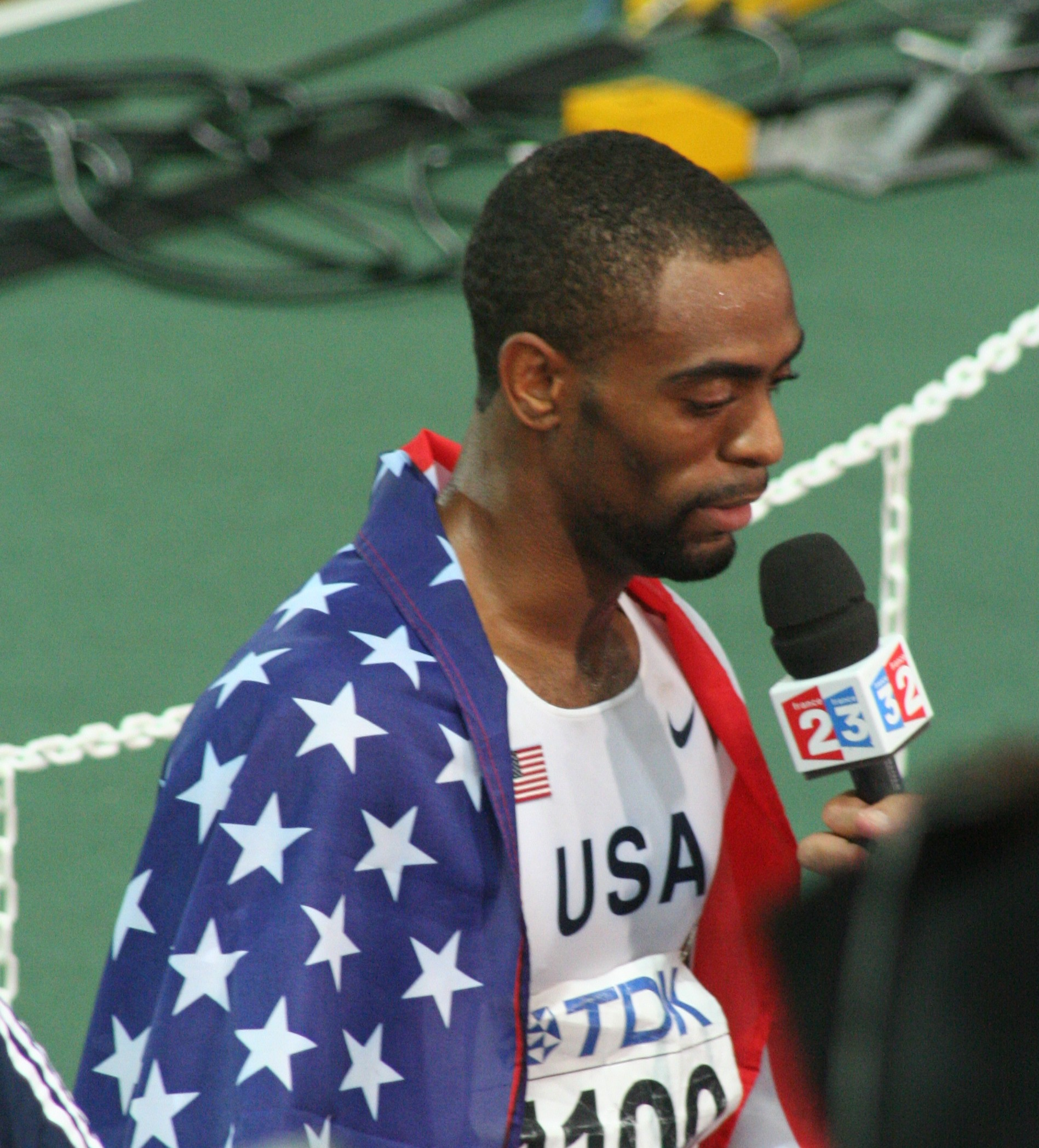
Gay being interviewed in Osaka

Gay's 200 m performance at the 2006 IAAF World Athletics Final in Stuttgart was the culmination of a highly successful year. He became the World Athletics Final champion with another improved personal best of 19.68 s, making him the joint third-fastest 200 m sprinter with Namibian Frankie Fredericks. Gay was pleased that Fredericks was on site to see his best equaled: "To run that time in front of Frankie is a privilege. He's someone I admire a great deal both as an athlete and as a man." Gay also won a bronze medal in the 100 m, finishing behind Powell and Scott. However, Gay proved himself over 100 m at the 2006 IAAF World Cup, taking gold with a 9.88 s run. At the end of the season, with Gatlin banned from competition, Gay dominated the Track and Field News US 2006 list, having run six of the seven fastest 100 m, with Scott in third, and four of the top six 200 m times (behind Carter and Spearmon). Furthermore, he was the second fastest 100 m runner in the world that year, second only to world record holder Powell. Having proven himself to be adept at both 100 and 200 m, Gay reflected upon his development as a sprinter:

It's kind of hard for me to choose which one's my favorite. Some people say I'm a better 200 meter runner than a 100 runner. [But] you get that label as 'second-fastest man' or 'the fastest man in the world'. I think that's why I like the 100 more.

— Tyson Gay, Lexington Herald-Leader

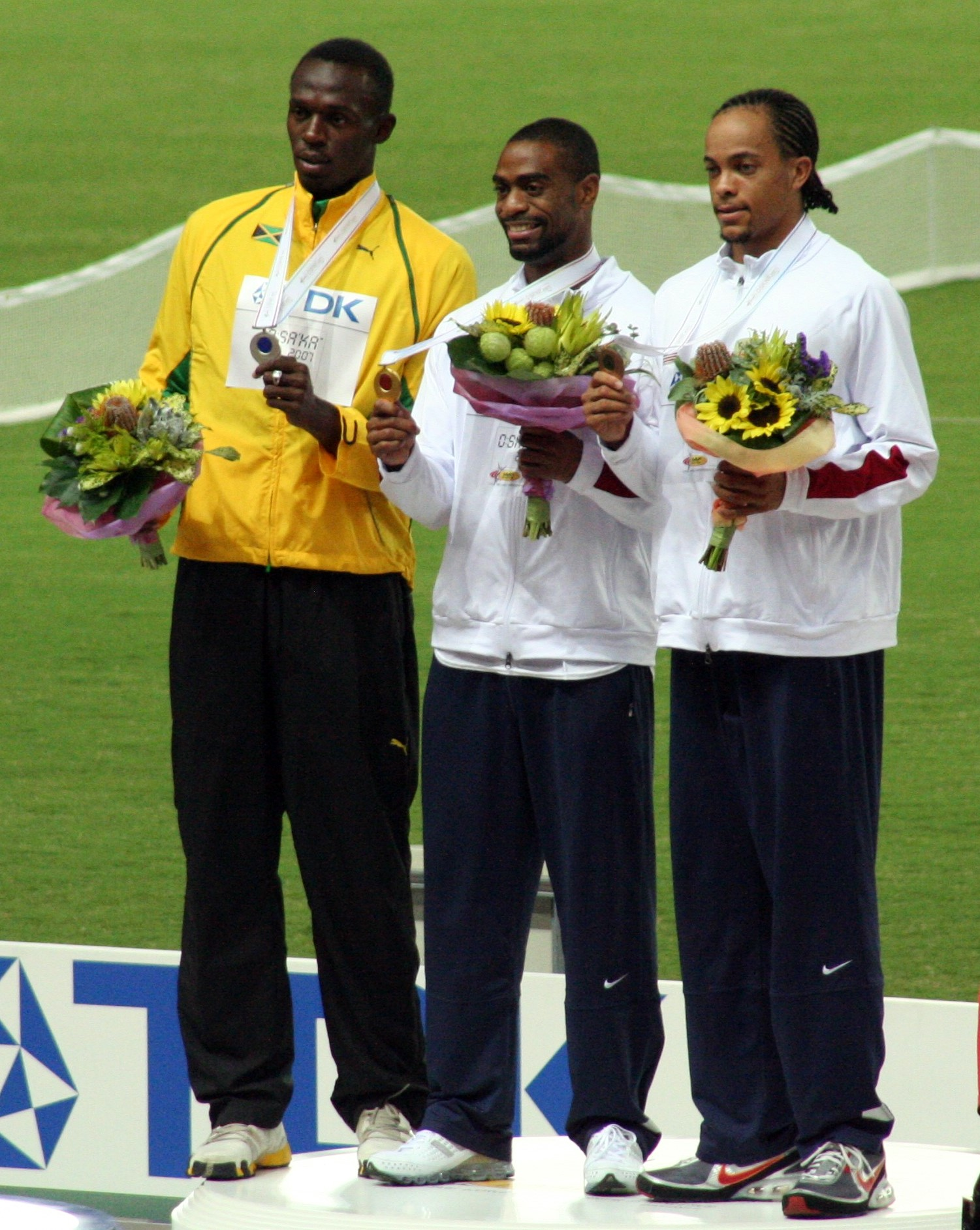
Gay (center) receiving his World Championship gold medal alongside Usain Bolt (left) and Wallace Spearmon (right)

=== 2007 Osaka World Championships ===
With Brauman still serving his sentence, Gay began working with a new coach – Olympic gold medalist Jon Drummond. Drummond was renowned for being quick off the mark, and Gay hoped that he could help improve his starting times. Gay aimed to challenge World Record holder Powell's dominance of the 100 m event, stating: "I want this to be a rivalry. I want to step up to the plate". His performances backed up his remarks, as he started the 2007 outdoor season with two wind-assisted runs of 9.79 s and 9.76 s. The latter time was recorded with a wind only 0.2 m/s over the allowed limit, and was superior to Powell's record of 9.77 s.

At the US National Championships he equaled his 100 m best of 9.84 s while running into the wind. This was a meeting record and the second fastest 100 m time with a headwind after Maurice Greene's 9.82 s run. He followed this with a new 200 m personal best in the finals, again facing an impeding wind. His time of 19.62 s was the second fastest ever; only Johnson's 19.32 s run at the 1996 Atlanta Olympics was faster. Gay was happy with the achievement but noted that the competition was still strong: "I wasn't thinking about any time. I was trying to get away from Spearmon as fast as I could." After noting that he was feeling worn out, Gay had a brief recuperation period in preparation for the 2007 World Championships in Osaka, Japan. He returned to the track in Europe and, while weather conditions were poor, he won the 200 m in Lausanne with 19.78 s and had wins at 100 m events in Sheffield and London. He relished the opportunity to face Powell at the World Championships: both sprinters were undefeated that year and Gay said that he felt ready for the challenge.

Facing each other for the first time that year, the IAAF described the 100 m final in Osaka as "the season's most eagerly-anticipated battle". Gay won with a time of 9.85 s, sprinting ahead of Derrick Atkins and third-placed Powell to become the new 100 m world champion. Although this was the American's first major 100 m title, he remained respectful of Powell:

We have long looked forward to this duel. And I think somehow we are both winners. Asafa has run a strong race. He is the World record holder while I am the fastest this year and now I am the World champion...He has taken the bronze this time, but he could well come back with the gold next year in Beijing...I think for this year it makes me the fastest man in the world.

— Tyson Gay, IAAF

Gay doubled his gold medal count in the 200 m event. He ran a new championship record time of 19.76 s to win a second gold medal, beating Usain Bolt and Spearmon to the post. Bolt was clear to point out that he lost to the better athlete: "I got beaten by the No. 1 man in the world. For the moment, he is unbeatable." Only Maurice Greene and Gatlin had won the sprint double at the Championships before, but Gay eyed a third gold in the 4 × 100 m relay. The Americans faced stiff competition from the Jamaican team, which included Powell and Bolt. The Jamaicans set a national record, but it was not enough to beat the United States team, who finished in a world-leading time of 37.78 s. Gay won his third gold medal alongside Darvis Patton, Spearmon and Leroy Dixon. The triple-gold haul repeated the feat achieved by Maurice Greene at the 1999 Seville World Championships and Carl Lewis in 1983 and 1987.

Although Gay had been bullish in victory on the track, the achievement did not change him—he remained humble and appreciative to his rivals. In November he was chosen as the IAAF Male World Athlete of the Year for 2007 and in his acceptance speech he paid tribute to his peers, encouraging Powell to remain focused and saying that he highly regarded the Jamaican. He also dismissed comparisons to his forebears, commenting: "I honestly believe that I need to have the World record like some of the other great sprinters like Carl Lewis, Maurice Greene. I think that sets you apart, having medals and having the World record." At the end of the season Gay was elected 2007 Men's Athlete of the Year by Track and Field News (topping the year's list as the fastest 100 m and 200 m sprinter), and he won the USATF's Harrison Dillard award as the top US male sprinter.

=== 2008 Beijing Olympics ===
Following Brauman's release from prison, Gay set out preparing for the Beijing Olympics, training with both Brauman and Jon Drummond in the off-season. Returning to competition in May, he continued as he had left off in 2007: winning the 200 m in Kingston, taking gold in both sprints at the Adidas Track Classic, and finishing second in the 100 m at the Reebok Grand Prix with a 9.85 s run. However, Gay now faced a new, emerging challenger in Usain Bolt; at the latter event Bolt had beaten Gay with a world-record-setting 9.72 s. Taking this into consideration, he realized that a world record time would be needed to beat both Bolt and Powell at the Olympics; Gay aimed to run below 9.70 s. With athletes running such quick times, the US Anti-Doping Agency (USADA) sought to counter claims of performance-enhancing drugs use through "Project Believe", a regular, extensive drugs testing program. The BALCO scandal and banning of high-profile athletes, including Gatlin and Marion Jones, damaged the public's perception of sprinting, and USADA recruited Gay to prove clean athletes could be just as successful.

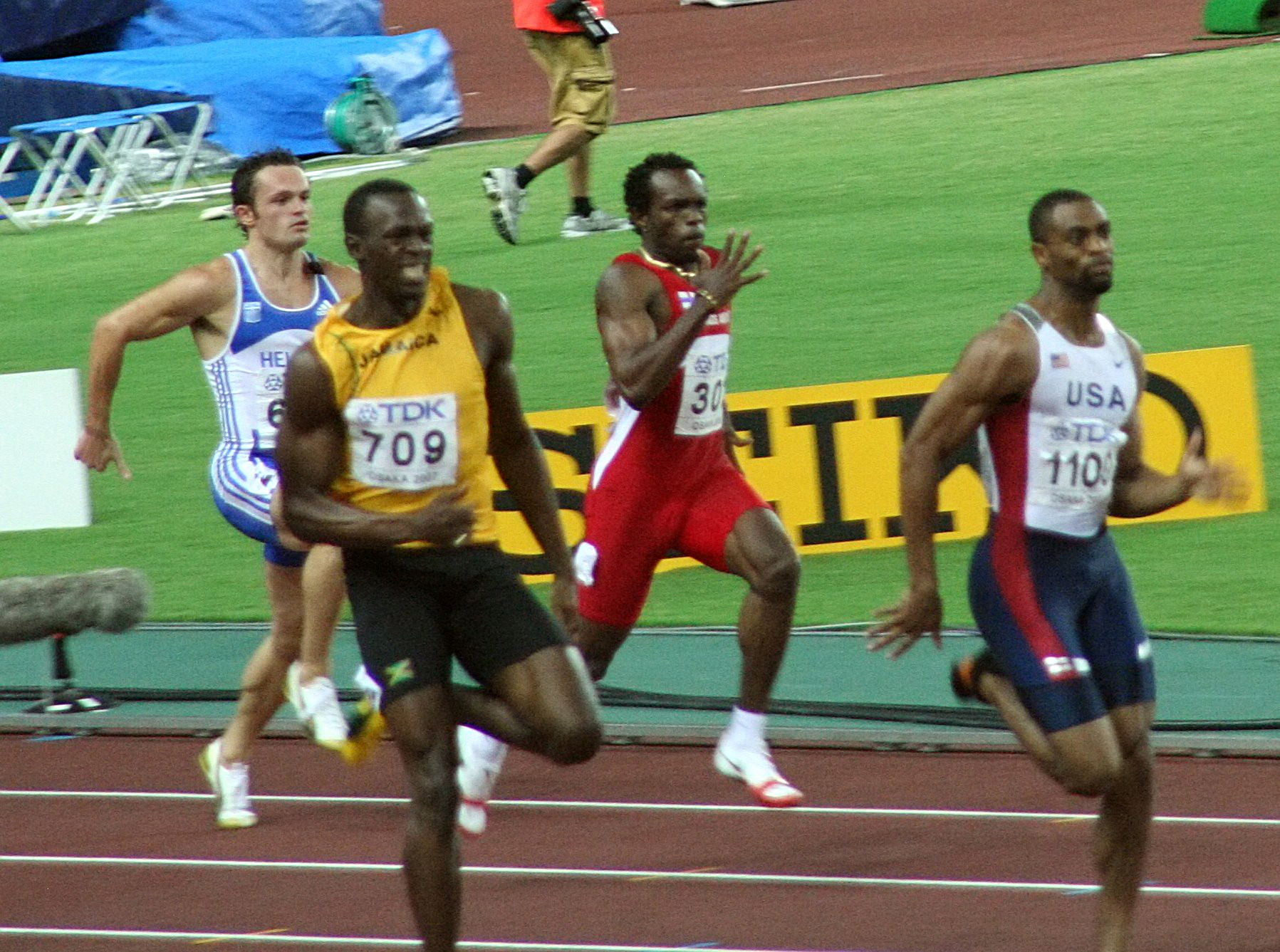
Gay leading in the 200 m against (left to right) Anastasios Gousis, Usain Bolt and Churandy Martina

The favorite for qualification in both the 100 m and 200 m at the US Olympic Trials, Gay put in a strong performance in the heats. After a misjudgement in the first round almost caused him to miss out on qualification, Gay resolved to step up his pace, and he won the 100 m quarter-final with a US record-setting run of 9.77 s. Breaking Maurice Greene's nine-year-old record, this made Gay the third fastest 100 m sprinter ever, after rivals Bolt and Powell. In the final the following day, Gay finished first in a wind-aided 9.68 s (+4.1 m/s). This was the fastest ever 100 m time under any conditions, bettering the 9.69 s record which Obadele Thompson had set 12 years earlier. The 200 m event was a significant setback for Gay as he suffered a severe hamstring injury in the qualifiers and was subsequently ruled out of the event for the Olympics. The injury persisted for several weeks and he dropped out of track meetings in order to recover in time for the Olympics.

Gay made his track return in Beijing but his injury had reduced his 100 m medal chances and Bolt and Powell were more favored to win the event. The much anticipated Gay, Bolt and Powell final never materialised, however, as Gay failed to qualify in the semi-finals. Finishing fifth after recording 10.05 s, Gay denied that he was still injured, but claimed the hamstring problem had upset his training schedule.

Further disappointment followed as the American 4 × 100 m relay team, with Gay as anchor, failed to qualify for the final. Darvis Patton and Gay failed to pass on the baton in the heat. Gay personally took responsibility for the dropped baton but Patton denied this was true, saying "That's Tyson Gay. He's a humble guy, but I know it's my job to get the guy the baton and I didn't do that." After stating his desire to win four Olympic gold medals (by adding the 400 meters to his repertoire) earlier in the year, Gay finished the 2008 Olympics without a single medal. Having failed to reach the finals of the 100 m sprint or relay, he reflected upon his failure to make the podium in Beijing: "[I felt the baton] then I went to grab it and there was nothing. It's kind of the way it's been happening to me this Olympics."

Gay rounded off the season in Europe, winning in the 200 m at Gateshead, but he had to withdraw from a ÅF Golden League race against Bolt and Powell due to his hamstring injury.

=== 2009 World silver and US record ===
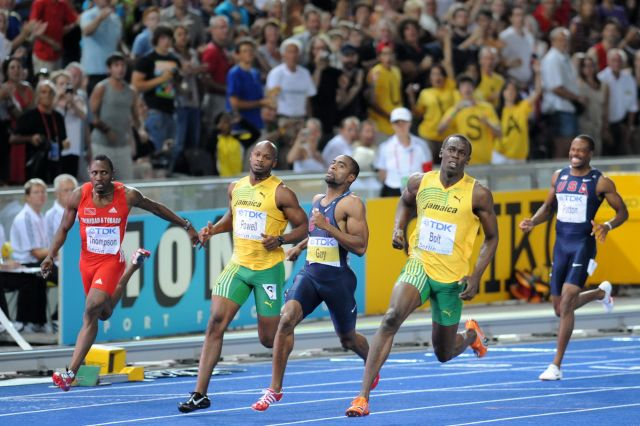
Gay trailed behind Bolt but set a new US record in the 100 m World final

Gay returned to competition after the indoor athletics season, recording a new 400 m personal best of 45.57 seconds in May. In his first 200 m outing of the season at the Reebok Grand Prix, he set a personal best and meet record of 19.58 seconds. This was the third fastest 200 m run ever, after Bolt and Johnson's world record-setting times. Following a wind-aided (3.4 m/s) 100 m run of 9.75 s at the US Championships, Gay stated that he could beat the world record if he improved his technique. Record holder Bolt dismissed the challenge, saying that it would be difficult for Gay as "he is more of a 200 m runner". At the Golden Gala in July, Gay beat Asafa Powell's 9.88 season's best with a 9.77 second run, equaling his own U.S. record. This improved upon Bolt's previous world leading time of 9.86 seconds.

The first event at the 2009 World Championships in August was the 100 m. After two sub-10 clockings in the preliminary rounds, Gay reached the final, along with Jamaicans Bolt and Powell. He ran a new US record of 9.71 seconds in the race, the third-fastest time in history, but even so had to settle for second place, losing his 100 m world title to Bolt, who knocked 0.11 seconds off the world record with a run of 9.58 seconds. However the 100m final aggravated a groin/hip injury he had been dealing with, and he subsequently withdrew from the 200m event to focus on recovery, hoping to get better for the 4x100m relay, but decided to withdraw from that too.

At the Shanghai Golden Grand Prix, on September 20, 2009, Gay ran the second-fastest men's 100 m on record, winning in 9.69 seconds, matching Usain Bolt's winning time at the Beijing Olympics in 2008. After beating Powell for the sixth time in Daegu, Gay stated that he would reconsider his plans for groin surgery in the off-season as it was mainly a case of resolving discomfort when running, rather than a more serious injury.

=== 2010 First Diamond League ===
At the start of the 2010 outdoor season, Gay ran a new 400 m best time of 44.89 seconds. This run, which improved upon his previous record by nearly seven-tenths of a second, made him the first sprinter ever to run under the significant time barriers in the three sprints – under ten seconds for the 100 m, twenty seconds for the 200 m, and 45 seconds for the 400 m.

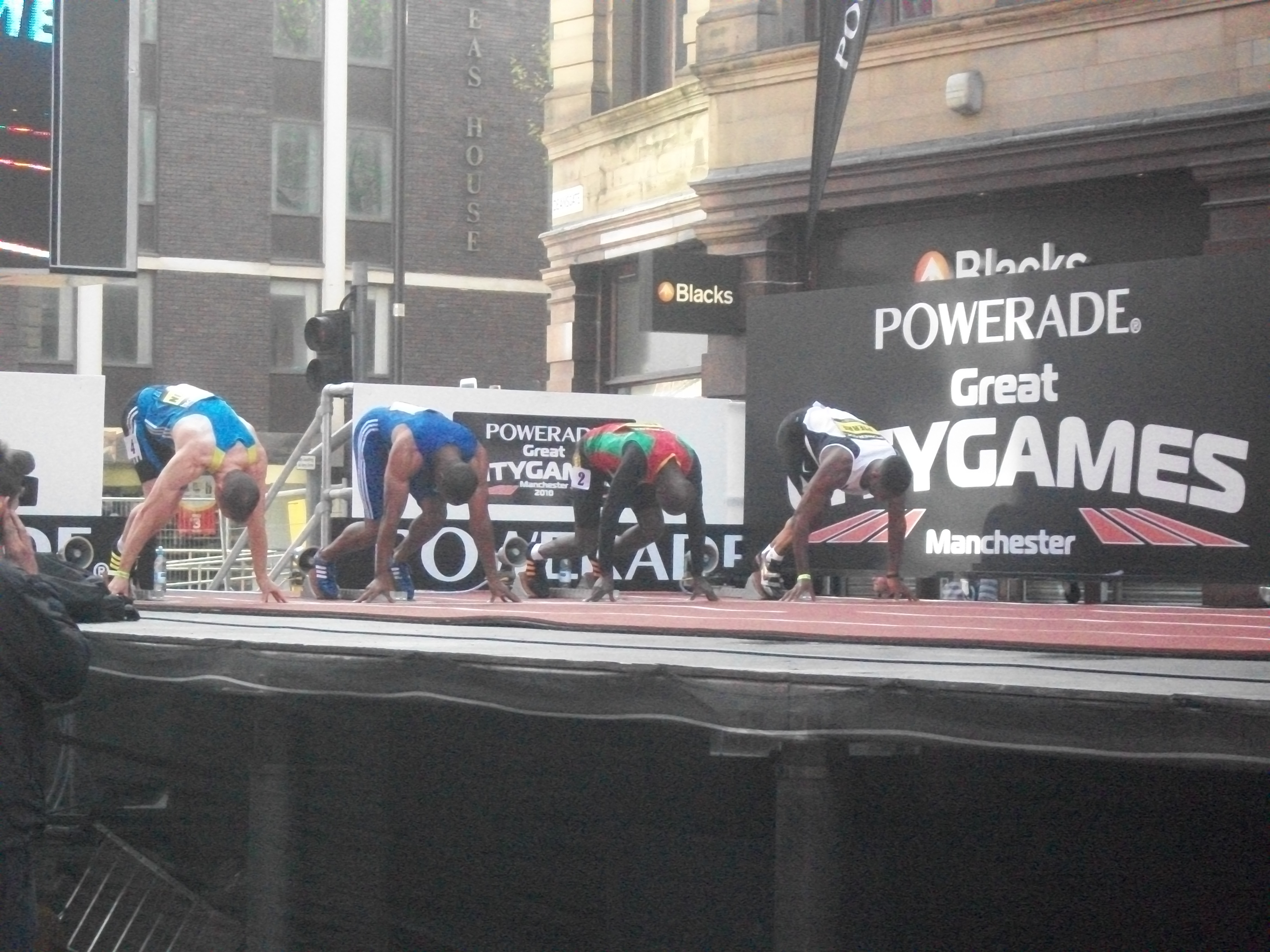
Gay (center left) ready to set his 200 m straight world best

At the Great City Games in Manchester, England in May, he set his sights on breaking Tommie Smith's 44-year-old world best mark over a 200 m straight. He beat Smith's time of 19.5 by finishing in 19.41 seconds – including a first 100 m of 9.88 and a first 150 m of 14.41 seconds. He suffered from hamstring difficulty after the run but returned to compete at the Prefontaine Classic in Eugene, Oregon, in July – his first meeting of the 2010 IAAF Diamond League. Running over 200 m, he finished in 19.76 seconds but was beaten to the line by Walter Dix, who returned from a year-long hiatus. A week later he attended the British Grand Prix and, in spite of poor conditions, he gained a victory over his rival Asafa Powell with a 9.93-second run. He set a meet record of 19.72 seconds at the Herculis meeting in Monaco later that month, but expressed disappointment with his race execution as Yohan Blake came close to overhauling him at the finish.

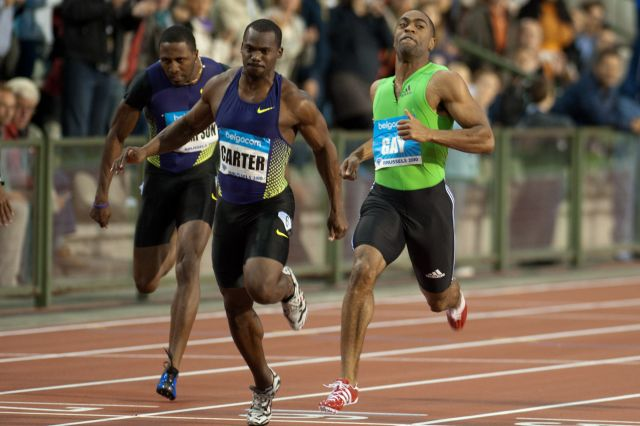
Gay winning the Diamond Race final at the Memorial van Damme

The 100 m at the DN Galan meeting in Stockholm saw Gay's first match-up of the year against Bolt. He surprised the Olympic and World champion with a resounding victory, beating him with 9.84 to Bolt's 9.97 seconds. This was only the second time Bolt had lost a 100 m final – the first occurring in July 2008 against Powell (also at Stockholm Olympic Stadium). Gay broke Powell's stadium record and earned a one carat diamond for the feat. Gay chose not to overstate the significance of the win, acknowledging that Bolt was far from peak fitness: "It feels great to beat Usain but deep down inside I know he is not 100%. I look forward to beating him when he is". With Bolt and Powell both out with injuries, Gay won unchallenged at the London Grand Prix the following week, running a world leading time of 9.78 seconds despite poor weather. A victory at the Memorial van Damme in 9.79 seconds earned him the first Diamond Race Trophy for the 100 m.

=== 2011 injury ===
He opened his 2011 season with a 14.51-second run in the 150 m straight race at Manchester's Great City Games, just behind Bolt's 2009 run. His season's best run of 9.79 sec for the 100 m came in June in Clermont, Florida, the third-fastest in the event that year. Gay was defeated by Steve Mullings at the adidas Grand Prix in New York, but Mullings failed a doping test later that month and was banned for life. A nagging hip injury led Gay to withdraw from the 2011 USA Outdoor Track and Field Championships and in July he underwent acetabular labrum surgery; almost a year passed until the next time he competed.

=== 2012 Olympics ===
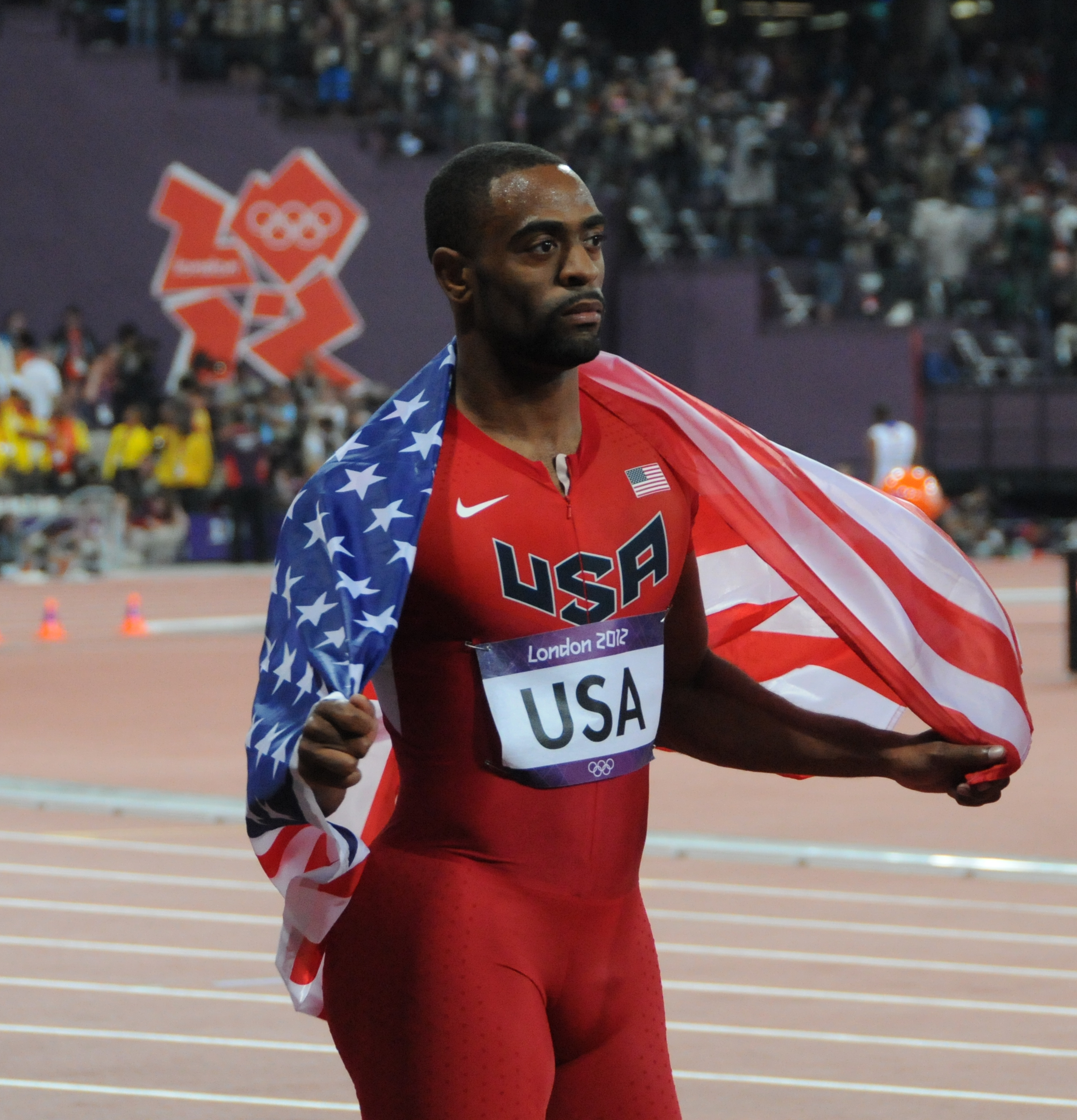
Tyson Gay after the 4 × 100 m relay at the 2012 Olympics

Showing readiness for the 2012 Olympic Trials, Gay ran in a low key "B race" at the adidas Grand Prix, running ten seconds flat into a headwind. Gay qualified for the 100 meters at the 2012 Summer Olympics after finishing second at the U.S. Olympic trials with a time of 9.86 seconds behind Justin Gatlin. Underlining his return to fitness, he won the 100 m at both the Paris and London legs of the 2012 Diamond League prior to the Olympics.

The 2012 Olympic 100 m final was the fastest-ever Olympic race: seven men under ten seconds. Bolt won in 9.63 seconds and was followed by Yohan Blake. Gay's run of 9.80 meant that he missed out on a bronze medal by one-hundredth of a second to compatriot Justin Gatlin. Gay was visibly upset about his failure to reach the Olympic podium and cried during the post-race interview, saying, "I felt like I ran with the field and I just came up short". The 4 × 100 m relay final brought Gay his first Olympic medal and an American-record time of 37.04 seconds alongside Trell Kimmons, Gatlin, and Ryan Bailey. Despite equaling the previous world-record mark, the Americans took the silver medal behind Jamaica, whose team improved that record by two-tenths of a second. However, he was later stripped of this medal after failing a drug test in 2013; this also cost the rest of the relay team their medals. In the last two Diamond League 100 m races, he ran 9.83 as runner-up at the Athletissima meet, where Yohan Blake equalled Gay's personal best time, and false started at the Weltklasse 100 m series final.

=== 2013 failed drug test ===
On July 14, 2013, before the World Championships in Moscow, it was announced that Gay had tested positive for a banned substance in May 2013. Gay admitted the doping, but blamed it on an unspecified third party: "I basically put my trust in someone and was let down." Adidas responded by suspending Gay's sponsorship contract with the sportswear manufacturer. Pending his verdict, he voluntarily withdrew from all competition, including the 2013 World Championships. On May 2, 2014, the United States Anti-Doping Agency (USADA) announced that Gay would be suspended until June 23, 2014, and that all his results from July 15, 2012, until his suspension—including his silver medal from the 2012 Summer Olympics—would be stricken.

=== 2015 ===
Tyson returned from his suspension to win the 100 m at the Prefontaine Classic.

USA Relays qualified to World and Olympic games at World Relays in Bahamas and won the 4 × 100 m relay.

In the 2015 World Athletics Championships, Gay, running against Usain Bolt, came only 6th of 9 in the final of the 100 m behind Bolt, Justin Gatlin, Trayvon Bromell, Andre de Grasse and Mike Rodgers.

=== 2016 ===
Competing in the 2016 Summer Olympics, Gay ran the third leg for the USA relay 4 × 100 m relay team. The team consisted of Justin Gatlin, Mike Rodgers, Trayvon Bromell, and Gay. The team finished third, behind Jamaica and Japan. However, Gay once again was stripped of an Olympic medal, as the American team was disqualified for Justin Gatlin committing a violation. The rule cited was 170.7, which deals with the baton exchange; when Rodgers passed the baton to Gatlin, the baton touched Gatlin's hand before it reached the exchange zone. The American 4 × 100 m relay team was disqualified in Rio, hence making Gay the fastest man in history to not win a medal at the Olympics. As a result, the Canadian team anchored by Andre de Grasse was awarded bronze.

In September 2016, it was announced that Gay would make a bid to join the U.S. bobsleigh team by competing at the National Push Championships at the Calgary track; however, he withdrew from the competition.

== Personal life ==
Gay lives in Clermont, a suburb of Orlando, Florida. He had a daughter with Shoshana Boyd, Trinity, and devoted himself to caring for her. While Brauman was in prison for fraud, Gay looked after the coach's wife and daughter. His mother Daisy married Tim Lowe in 1995, adding two half-siblings, Seth and Haleigh Lowe, to Gay's family.

On October 16, 2016, Trinity Gay, 15, was fatally shot in the neck. She was a bystander during a shootout between occupants of two cars in the parking lot of a Cook Out restaurant in Lexington, Kentucky. She died at University of Kentucky Medical Center shortly thereafter.

Gay attended the St. John Missionary Baptist Church as a child, and when he returns home he still attends the church services. "I'm a religious man, so I really believe in my God-given ability, that I can do the unexpected. I really do believe I can break a record, or come close to it, or win a medal."

== Achievements ==
Gay holds the US record in the 100 m with 9.69 s, making him the joint second fastest sprinter, along with Yohan Blake, in the history of the event after Usain Bolt. His 19.58 s makes him history's tenth fastest 200 m runner and the USA's seventh fastest. In 2010 Gay was a member of the fifth-fastest 4 × 100 m relay team in history, running a 37.45 s with teammates Trell Kimmons, Wallace Spearmon and Michael Rodgers in Weltklasse Zürich 2010. His sprint combination of 100 m and 200 m in 9.84 s and 19.62 s, run over two days in 2007, was the best ever combo at that time. During the Tom Jones Memorial Classic in Gainesville on April 17, 2010, Tyson Gay clocked 44.89 in the 400 m event and became the first man in history to dip under 10.00 in the 100 m, under 20.00 in the 200 m and under 45.00 in the 400 m.

=== Personal bests ===
Event	Time (s)	Wind (m/s)	Competition	Venue	Date	Notes	Ref
100 m	9.69	+2.0	Shanghai Golden Grand Prix	Shanghai, China	September 20, 2009	NR, MR	
100 m	9.68 w	+4.1	U.S. Olympic Trials	Eugene, Oregon, U.S.	June 29, 2008	Wind-assisted	
150 m	14.51	+1.5	Great CityGames Manchester	Manchester, United Kingdom	May 15, 2011	NR, MR	
200 m	19.58	+1.3	Adidas Grand Prix	New York, New York, U.S.	May 30, 2009		
200 m straight	19.41	−0.4	Great CityGames Manchester	Manchester, United Kingdom	May 16, 2010	WB	
400 m	44.89	n/a	Tom Jones Memorial Classic	Gainesville, Florida, U.S.	April 17, 2010		

=== International championship results ===
Year	Competition	Venue	Position	Event	Time	Notes
Representing the United States and the Americas (Continental Cup only)
2002	NACAC U-25 Championships	San Antonio, Texas, U.S.	1st	4 × 100 m relay	39.79	PB
2005
2005	World Championships	Helsinki, Finland	4th	200 m	20.34	
2005	World Championships	Helsinki, Finland	DNF (semis)	4 × 100 m relay	—	
2005	World Athletics Final	Monte Carlo, Monaco	1st	200 m	19.96	
2006	World Athletics Final	Stuttgart, Germany	3rd	100 m	9.92	
2006	World Athletics Final	Stuttgart, Germany	1st	200 m	19.68	PB
2006	World Cup*	Athens, Greece	1st	100 m	9.88	
2006	World Cup*	Athens, Greece	1st	4 × 100 m relay	37.59	CR, PB
2007			1st			
2007	World Championships	Osaka, Japan	1st	100 m	9.85	
2007	World Championships	Osaka, Japan	1st	200 m	19.76	
2007	World Championships	Osaka, Japan	1st	4 × 100 m relay	37.78	SB
2008
2008	Olympic Games	Beijing, China	9th (semis)	100 m	10.05	
2008	Olympic Games	Beijing, China	DNF (semis)	4 × 100 m relay	—	
2009
2009	World Championships	Berlin, Germany	2nd	100 m	9.71	NR, PB
2009	World Championships	Berlin, Germany	DNS	200 m	—	
2009	World Athletics Final	Thessaloniki, Greece	1st	100 m	9.88	
2010	Continental Cup	Split, Croatia	1st	4 × 100 m relay	38.25	
2010	Diamond League Final	Brussels, Belgium	1st	100 m	9.79	
2012
2012	Olympic Games**	London, United Kingdom	DQ	100 m	~~9.80~~	Doping
2012	Olympic Games**	London, United Kingdom	DQ	4 × 100 m relay	~~37.04~~	Doping
2014	Diamond League Final	Brussels, Belgium	6th	100 m	10.01	
2015	World Relays	Nassau, Bahamas	1st	4 × 100 m relay	37.38	NR, CR, PB
2015	World Championships	Beijing, China	6th	100 m	10.00	
2015	World Championships	Beijing, China	DQ	4 × 100 m relay	—	Out of zone pass
2016			DQ			
2016	Olympic Games	Rio de Janeiro, Brazil	DQ	4 × 100 m relay	—	Out of zone pass

*Known as the Continental Cup starting with the 2010 edition.
**He was stripped of all his results from the 2012 Olympic Games due to doping violations.

=== Circuit wins ===
- IAAF Diamond League
  - Overall winner: 2010 (100 m)
  - 2010: Gateshead (100 m), Monaco (200 m), Stockholm (100 m), London (100 m), Zürich (4 × 100 m relay), Brussels (100 m)
  - 2012: New York (100 m), Paris (100 m), London (100 m), ~~Monaco (4 × 100 m relay)~~, ~~Zürich (4 × 100 m relay)~~
  - 2013: ~~New York (100 m)~~, ~~Lausanne (100 m)~~
  - 2015: Eugene (100 m), New York (100 m), Monaco (4 × 100 m relay)
- IAAF Golden League
  - 2006: Brussels (200 m)
  - 2009: Rome (100 m)

=== National titles ===
- U.S. Championships
  - 100 m: 2006, 2007, 2008, ~~2013~~, 2015
  - 200 m: 2007, ~~2013~~
- NCAA Division I Championships
  - 100 m: 2004
  - 4 × 100 m relay: 2005
- NJCAA Division I Championships
  - 100 m: 2002
- NJCAA Division I Indoor Championships
  - 60 m: 2002
  - 200 m: 2002

== Awards ==
- World Athletics Awards

World Athlete of the Year (Men)：2007

== See also ==
- World Fit

== Notes ==
Awards
Preceded by (Jamaica) Asafa Powell	Men's Track & Field Athlete of the Year; 2007	Succeeded by (Jamaica) Usain Bolt
Preceded by (Jamaica) Asafa Powell	IAAF World Athlete of the Year; 2007	Succeeded by (Jamaica) Usain Bolt
Preceded by Joey Cheek	USOC Sportsman of the Year; 2007	Succeeded by Michael Phelps
Achievements
Preceded by (United States) Xavier Carter	Men's season's best performance, 200 meters 2007	Succeeded by (Jamaica) Usain Bolt
Preceded by (Jamaica) Usain Bolt	Men's season's best performance, 100 meters 2010 (tied with Nesta Carter)	Succeeded by (Jamaica) Usain Bolt
