= 2007 World Championships in Athletics – Men's 4 × 100 metres relay =

The men's 4 × 100 metre relay at the 2007 World Championships in Athletics was held at the Nagai Stadium on 31 August and 1 September.

== Medalists ==
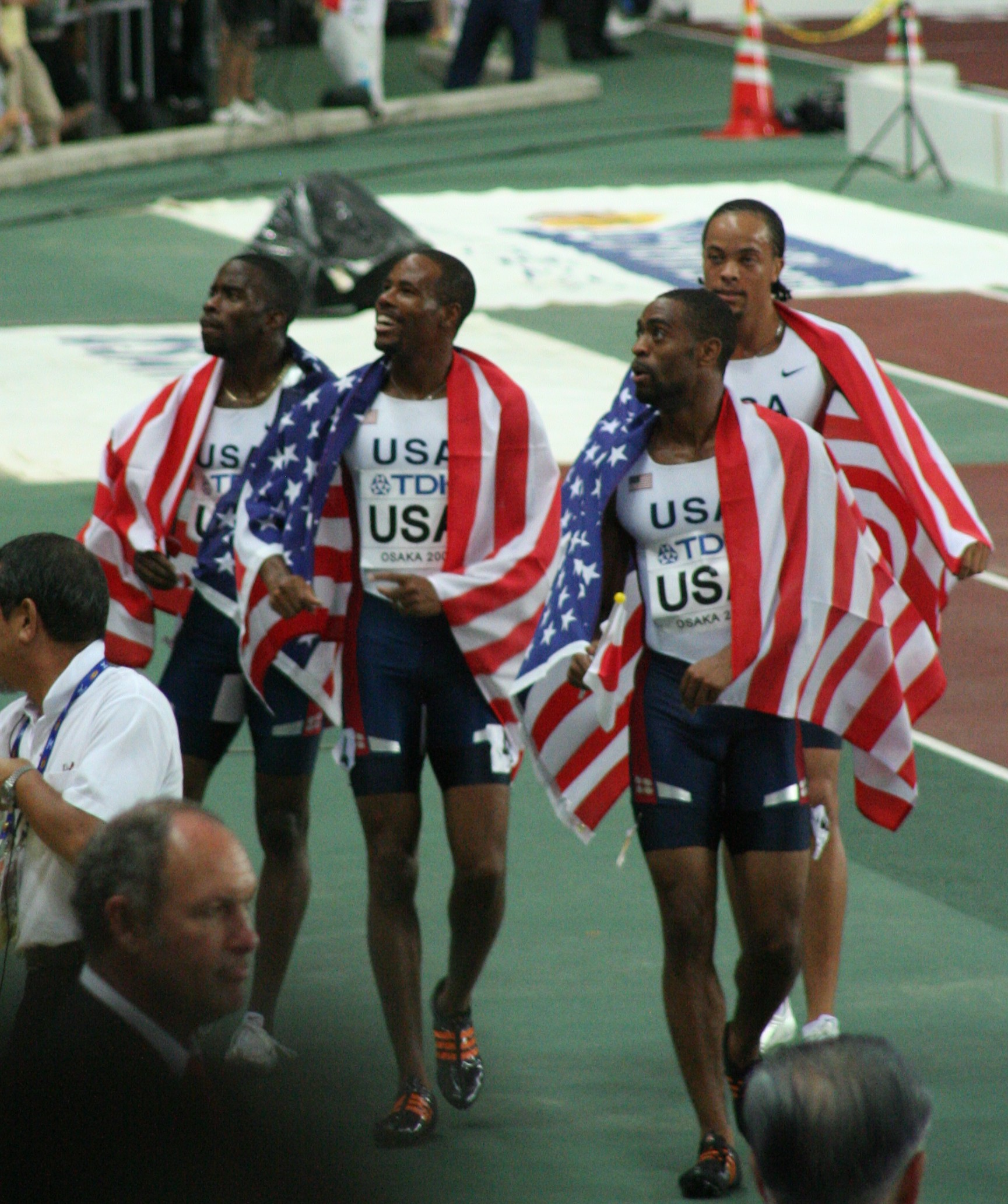
The American team celebrating victory (L–R: Dixon, Patton, Gay, Spearmon)

Gold	Silver	Bronze
United States; Darvis Patton; Wallace Spearmon; Tyson Gay; Leroy Dixon; Rodney Martin*	Jamaica; Marvin Anderson; Usain Bolt; Nesta Carter; Asafa Powell; Dwight Thomas*; Steve Mullings*	United Kingdom; Christian Malcolm; Craig Pickering; Marlon Devonish; Mark Lewis-Francis

* Runners who participated in the heats only and received medals.

== Records ==
Prior to the competition, the following records were as follows.

World record	United States (USA); Jon Drummond, Andre Cason, Dennis Mitchell, Leroy Burrell	37.40	Stuttgart, Germany	21 August 1993
Championship record	United States (USA); Jon Drummond, Andre Cason, Dennis Mitchell, Leroy Burrell	37.40	Stuttgart, Germany	21 August 1993

== Schedule ==
Date	Time	Round
August 31, 2007	20:40	Heats
September 1, 2007	22:20	Final

== Results ==
=== Heats ===
The first 2 of each heat (Q) plus the 2 fastest times (q) qualify.

Rank	Heat	Nation	Athletes	Time	Notes
1	2	Jamaica	Dwight Thomas, Steve Mullings, Nesta Carter, Asafa Powell	38.02	Q, WL
2	2	United States	Rodney Martin, Wallace Spearmon, Darvis Patton, Leroy Dixon	38.10	Q, SB
3	2	Japan	Naoki Tsukahara, Shingo Suetsugu, Shinji Takahira, Nobuharu Asahara	38.21	Q, AR
4	1	Brazil	Vicente de Lima, Rafael Ribeiro, Basílio de Moraes, Sandro Viana	38.27	Q
5	1	Great Britain	Christian Malcolm, Craig Pickering, Marlon Devonish, Mark Lewis-Francis	38.33	Q
6	2	Nigeria	Obinna Metu, Chukwu Uche Isaac, Chinedu Oriala, Olusoji Fasuba	38.43	q, SB
7	2	Germany	Ronny Ostwald, Tobias Unger, Alexander Kosenkow, Julian Reus	38.56	q, SB
8	1	Poland	Michał Bielczyk, Łukasz Chyła, Marcin Jędrusiński, Dariusz Kuć	38.70	Q
9	2	Australia	Matt Shirvington, Adam Miller, Tim Williams, Aaron Rouge-Serret	38.73	SB
10	1	Italy	Rosario La Mastra, Simone Collio, Maurizio Checcucci, Jacques Riparelli	38.81	
11	1	South Africa	Christian Krone, Leigh Julius, Snyman Prinsloo, Sherwin Vries	39.05	SB
12	1	Russia	Aleksandr Volkov, Mikhail Yegorychev, Roman Smirnov, Ivan Teplykh	39.08	SB
13	1	Canada	Richard Adu-Bobie, Anson Henry, Jared Connaughton, Neville Wright	39.43	

=== Final ===
Rank	Nation	Athletes	Time	Notes
1st place, gold medalist(s)	United States	Darvis Patton, Wallace Spearmon, Tyson Gay, Leroy Dixon	37.78	WL
2nd place, silver medalist(s)	Jamaica	Marvin Anderson, Usain Bolt, Nesta Carter, Asafa Powell	37.89	NR
3rd place, bronze medalist(s)	Great Britain	Christian Malcolm, Craig Pickering, Marlon Devonish, Mark Lewis-Francis	37.90	SB
4	Brazil	Vicente de Lima, Rafael Ribeiro, Basílio de Moraes, Sandro Viana	37.99	SB
5	Japan	Naoki Tsukahara, Shingo Suetsugu, Shinji Takahira, Nobuharu Asahara	38.03	AR
6	Germany	Ronny Ostwald, Tobias Unger, Alexander Kosenkow, Julian Reus	38.62	
	Poland	Michał Bielczyk, Łukasz Chyła, Marcin Jędrusiński, Dariusz Kuć	DNF	
	Nigeria	Obinna Metu, Chukwu Uche Isaac, Chinedu Oriala, Olusoji Fasuba	DNF	
