= 2008 IAAF World Indoor Championships – Men's 60 metres =

== Medalists ==
Gold
Olusoji Fasuba	Nigeria
Silver
Dwain Chambers	United Kingdom
Kim Collins	Saint Kitts and Nevis

== Heats ==
Heat	Lane	Name	Country	Mark	Q	React
1	6	Dwain Chambers	United Kingdom	6.69	Q	0.261
1	2	Isaac Uche	Nigeria	6.74	Q	0.269
1	1	Ihor Bodrov	Ukraine	6.76	q	0.138
1	5	Amr Ibrahim Mostafa Seoud	Egypt	6.78 NR	q	0.220
1	3	Gibrilla Pato Bangura	Sierra Leone	6.89		0.250
1	7	Khalil Al-Hanahneh	Jordan	7.14		0.291
1	8	Aisea Tohi	Tonga	7.24 PB		0.213
1	4	Reginaldo Micha Ndong	Equatorial Guinea	7.72 PB		0.452
2	5	Leroy Dixon	United States	6.64	Q	0.142
2	3	Francis Obikwelu	Portugal	6.70	Q	0.266
2	2	Fabio Cerutti	Italy	6.73	q	0.190
2	7	Kael Becerra	Chile	6.75	q	0.151
2	8	Danny D'Souza	Seychelles	7.02 NR		0.219
2	4	Moudjib Toyb	Comoros	7.03		0.188
2	6	Michael Alicto	Guam	7.27 PB		0.230
2	1	Federico Gorrieri	San Marino	7.49 SB		0.197
3	3	Kim Collins	Saint Kitts and Nevis	6.70	Q	0.166
3	5	Andrey Yepishin	Russia	6.76	Q	0.246
3	8	José Carlos Moreira	Brazil	6.79		0.250
3	2	Seth Amoo	Ghana	6.88		0.264
3	1	Seng Song Poh	Singapore	6.93 SB		0.172
3	6	Sébastien Gattuso	Monaco	6.94 NR		0.246
3	7	Taufik Rahmadi	Indonesia	6.97 PB		0.215
3	4	Tavita Solomona	Samoa	7.35 PB		0.255
4	7	Simone Collio	Italy	6.71	Q	0.162
4	1	Martial Mbandjock	France	6.72	Q	0.171
4	8	Dmytro Hlushchenko	Ukraine	6.77	q	0.255
4	2	Adrian Durant	United States Virgin Islands	6.78	q	0.156
4	5	Omar Jouma Bilal Al-Salfa	United Arab Emirates	6.88		0.262
4	3	Jack Howard	Federated States of Micronesia	7.13 SB		0.189
4	4	Abraham Kepsen	Vanuatu	7.44 PB		0.252
4	6	Kermeliss Olonghot	Republic of the Congo	DNS		
5	7	Olusoji Fasuba	Nigeria	6.64	Q	0.167
5	8	Brendan Christian	Antigua and Barbuda	6.67	Q	0.141
5	2	Henry Vizcaino	Cuba	6.70	q	0.161
5	5	Chun Wai Leung	Hong Kong	6.97		0.221
5	4	Idrissa Sanou	Burkina Faso	7.03		0.275
5	3	Aleksandr Abrahamyan	Armenia	7.38 PB		0.290
5	6	Dylab Menzies	Norfolk Island	7.42 SB		0.168
6	5	Simeon Williamson	United Kingdom	6.69	Q	0.159
6	2	Marius Broening	Germany	6.74	Q	0.257
6	1	Maarten Heisen	Netherlands	6.77	q	0.248
6	4	Ramil Guliyev	Azerbaijan	6.84		0.249
6	6	Darren Gilford	Malta	6.99 SB		0.157
6	7	Hin Fong Pao	Macau	7.07 SB		0.235
6	3	Rabangaki Nawai	Kiribati	7.26 PB		0.246
6	8	Leon Mengloi	Palau	7.51 PB		0.273
7	4	Yhann Plummer	Jamaica	6.64 PB	Q	0.169
7	8	Vicente de Lima	Brazil	6.71	Q	0.152
7	5	Alex Trembach	Israel	6.93		0.174
7	2	Adrian Ferreira	Paraguay	7.19 PB		0.206
7	3	Kilakone Siphonexay	Laos	7.41 PB		0.266
7	7	Daniel Bailey	Antigua and Barbuda	DSQ		
7	6	Ben Youssef Meité	Ivory Coast	DNS		
7	1	Sompote Suwannarangsri	Thailand	DNS		
8	8	Michael Rodgers	United States	6.62	Q	0.137
8	6	Ángel David Rodríguez	Spain	6.69	Q	0.169
8	5	Rolando Palacios	Honduras	6.83		0.287
8	4	Jared Lewis	Saint Vincent and the Grenadines	6.89		0.168
8	2	Lerone Clarke	Jamaica	6.89		0.383
8	3	Francis Manioru	Solomon Islands	7.22 SB		0.257
8	7	Shahriful Bahrin Zainal	Brunei	7.44 NR		0.255

== Semifinals ==
Heat	Lane	Name	Country	Mark	Q	React
1	6	Dwain Chambers	United Kingdom	6.55 PB	Q	0.160
1	7	Isaac Uche	Nigeria	6.65	Q	0.144
1	5	Francis Obikwelu	Portugal	6.66 SB		0.242
1	8	Amr Ibrahim Mostafa Seoud	Egypt	6.69 NR		0.134
1	2	Ihor Bodrov	Ukraine	6.71		0.153
1	3	Simone Collio	Italy	6.74		0.250
1	4	Leroy Dixon	United States	6.75		0.295
1	1	Henry Vixcaíno	Cuba	6.77		0.276
2	3	Michael Rodgers	United States	6.54 PB	Q	0.117
2	5	Vicente de Lima	Brazil	6.59	Q	0.145
2	4	Kim Collins	Saint Kitts and Nevis	6.61	q	0.214
2	6	Simeon Williamson	United Kingdom	6.63	q	0.155
2	8	Martial Mbandjock	France	6.65 PB		0.141
2	1	Fabio Cerutti	Italy	6.69		0.146
2	2	Kael Becerra	Chile	6.80		0.147
2	7	Adrian Durant	United States Virgin Islands	6.86		0.234
3	6	Olusoji Fasuba	Nigeria	6.51 WL	Q	0.150
3	7	Andrey Yepishin	Russia	6.60 SB	Q	0.103
3	5	Yhann Plummer	Jamaica	6.65 PB		0.166
3	2	Marius Broening	Germany	6.67		0.137
3	4	Ángel David Rodríguez	Spain	6.70		0.176
3	8	Maarten Heisen	Netherlands	6.71		0.157
3	1	Dmytro Hlushchenko	Ukraine	6.72		0.239
3	3	Brendan Christian	Antigua and Barbuda	6.72		0.180

== Final ==
Heat	Lane	Name	Country	Mark	React
Gold medal	6	Olusoji Fasuba	Nigeria	6.51 WL	0.149
Silver medal	2	Kim Collins	Saint Kitts and Nevis	6.54 SB	0.130
Silver medal	3	Dwain Chambers	United Kingdom	6.54 PB	0.148
4	5	Michael Rodgers	United States	6.57	0.154
5	4	Vicente de Lima	Brazil	6.60	0.149
6	8	Isaac Uche	Nigeria	6.63	0.133
7	1	Simeon Williamson	United Kingdom	6.63	0.160
8	7	Andrey Yepishin	Russia	6.70	0.162
