= Alex Trembach =

Israeli sprinter (born 1986)

Alex Trembach (Hebrew: אלכס טרמבך; born 7 July 1986) is an Israeli sprinter who specializes in the 100 metres.

He competed at the 2008 World Indoor Championships without reaching the final.

His personal best times are 6.69 seconds in the 60 metres (indoor), achieved in February 2008 in Chişinău; and 10.57 seconds in the 100 metres, achieved in June 2008 in Haifa. In 2008 he was suspended for 2 years after testing positive for Norandrosterone.
