= 2010 Memorial Van Damme =

- Dates: 27 August
- Host city: Brussels, Belgium
- Venue: King Baudouin Stadium
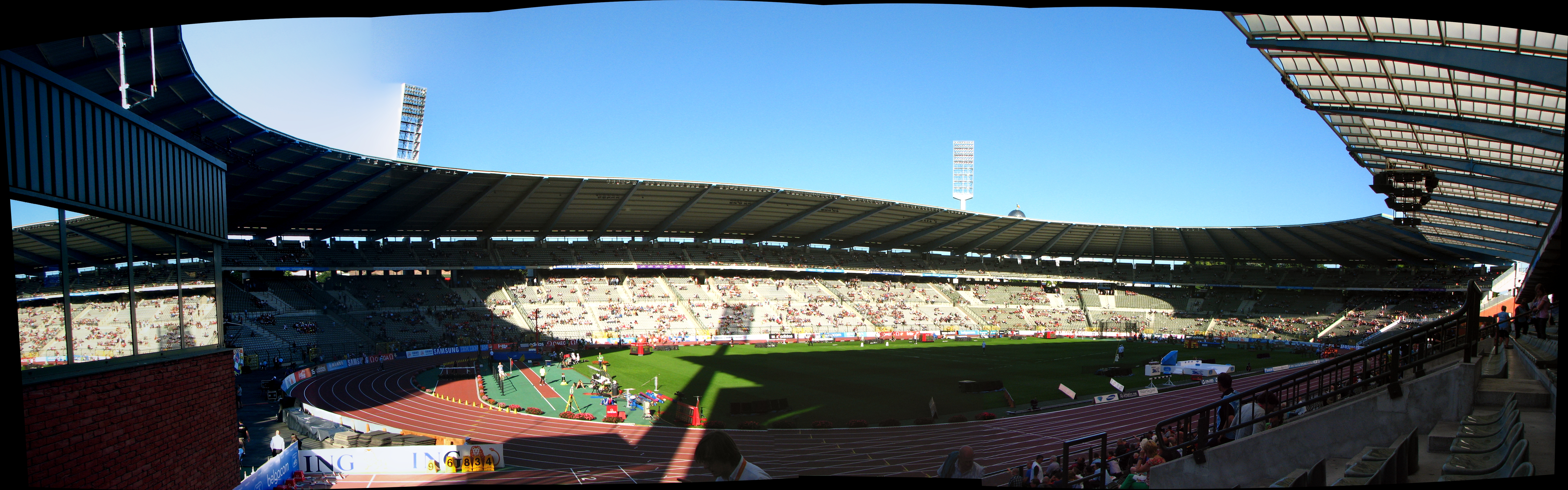
- Level: 2010 IAAF Diamond League
- Events: 30 (16 Diamond League)

The 2010 Memorial Van Damme was the 34th edition of the annual outdoor track and field meeting in Brussels, Belgium. Held on 27 August at the King Baudouin Stadium, it was the fourteenth leg of the inaugural IAAF Diamond League – the highest level international track and field circuit – and the second half of the final for 2010 (the first half being held during the Weltklasse Zürich in Zürich, Switzerland on 18–19 August).

== Diamond League champions ==
Men		Women	
Athlete	Event	Athlete	Event
Tyson Gay (USA)	100 m	Allyson Felix (USA)	200 m
David Rudisha (KEN)	800 m	Janeth Jepkosgei (KEN)	800 m
Asbel Kiprop (KEN)	1500 m	Vivian Cheruiyot (KEN)	5000 m
Bershawn Jackson (USA)	400 m hurdles	Priscilla Lopes-Schliep (CAN)	100 m hurdles
Renaud Lavillenie (FRA)	Pole vault	Milcah Chemos Cheiywa (KEN)	3000 m steeplechase
Teddy Tamgho (FRA)	Triple jump	Blanka Vlašić (CRO)	High jump
Christian Cantwell (USA)	Shot put	Yargelis Savigne (CUB)	Triple jump
Andreas Thorkildsen (NOR)	Javelin throw	Yarelis Barrios (CUB)	Discus throw

== Records ==
The following records were set at the meet.

Type	Athlete	Event	Mark
Meeting	Reese Hoffa (USA)	Men's shot put	22.16 m
North American	Molly Huddle (USA)	Women's 5000 m	14:44.76
World junior	Almaz Ayana (ETH)	Women's 3000 m steeplechase	9:22.51
Croatian	Sandra Perković (CRO)	Women's discus throw	66.93 m

Kenyan athlete Vivian Cheruiyot also ran a world leading 14.34.13 in the women's 5000 m, the fastest time in 2010.

== Diamond League results ==
=== Men ===
100 m (+0.1 m/s)
Place	Athlete	Time	Points
1	Tyson Gay (USA)	9.79	16 (+8)
2	Nesta Carter (JAM)	9.85 PB	6 (+4)
3	Yohan Blake (JAM)	9.91	7 (+2)
4	Daniel Bailey (ATG)	10.09	1
5	Richard Thompson (TTO)	10.11	8
6	Mario Forsythe (JAM)	10.12	0
7	Trell Kimmons (USA)	10.20	0
8	Dexter Lee (JAM)	10.21	0
9	Martial Mbandjock (FRA)	10.26	0

800 m
Place	Athlete	Time	Points
1	David Rudisha (KEN)	1:43.50	20 (+8)
2	Abubaker Kaki Khamis (SUD)	1:43.84 PB	10 (+4)
3	Boaz Lalang (KEN)	1:44.29	2 (+2)
4	Marcin Lewandowski (POL)	1:44.97	5
5	Jackson Mumbwa Kivuva (KEN)	1:45.62	1
6	David Mutinda Mutua (KEN)	1:45.90 PB	0
7	Antonio Manuel Reina (ESP)	1:45.97	0
8	Duane Solomon (USA)	1:46.17	0
9	Belal Mansoor Ali (BHR)	1:46.74	0
10	Bram Som (NED)	1:48.06	1
DNF (PM)	Sammy Tangui (KEN)	Did not finish (pacemaker)	0

1500 m
Place	Athlete	Time	Points
1	Asbel Kiprop (KEN)	3:32.18	22 (+8)
2	Leonel Manzano (USA)	3:32.37 PB	6 (+4)
3	Augustine Kiprono Choge (KEN)	3:32.88	13 (+2)
4	Mekonnen Gebremedhin (ETH)	3:33.40	6
5	Tom Lancashire (GBR)	3:33.96 PB	8
6	Daniel Kipchirchir Komen (KEN)	3:34.03	0
7	Carsten Schlangen (GER)	3:34.19 PB	0
8	Collis Birmingham (AUS)	3:35.50 PB	0
9	Nixon Chepseba (KEN)	3:36.14	0
10	Abdelaati Iguider (MAR)	3:36.73	0
11	Álvaro Fernández Cerezo (ESP)	3:37.13	0
12	Kristof Van Malderen (BEL)	3:37.36	0
13	Arturo Casado (ESP)	3:37.67	0
14	Samir Dahmani (FRA)	3:38.01 PB	0
15	Ismael Kipngetich Kombich (KEN)	3:40.98	0
DNF (PM)	Johan Cronje (RSA)	Did not finish (pacemaker)	0
DNF (PM)	David Krummenacker (USA)	Did not finish (pacemaker)	0
DNF (PM)	Víctor Seco (ESP)	Did not finish (pacemaker)	0

400 m hurdles
Place	Athlete	Time	Points
1	Bershawn Jackson (USA)	47.85	28 (+8)
2	Dai Greene (GBR)	48.26	6 (+4)
3	Javier Culson (PUR)	48.71	7 (+2)
4	Justin Gaymon (USA)	49.30	0
5	Michaël Bultheel (BEL)	49.38 PB	0
6	Angelo Taylor (USA)	49.72	3
7	Jehue Gordon (TTO)	49.80	0
8	Sébastien Maillard (FRA)	50.75	0
9	Nils Duerinck (BEL)	51.17	0

Pole vault
Place	Athlete	Mark	Points
1	Malte Mohr (GER)	5.85 m PB	15 (+8)
2	Renaud Lavillenie (FRA)	5.80 m	20 (+4)
3	Maksym Mazuryk (UKR)	5.75 m	4 (+2)
4	Fabian Schulze (GER)	5.65 m	0
5	Steven Hooker (AUS)	5.65 m	4
6	Derek Miles (USA)	5.65 m	4
7	Giuseppe Gibilisco (ITA)	5.55 m	0
8	Łukasz Michalski (POL)	5.55 m	5
9	Romain Mesnil (FRA)	5.45 m	0
10	Kevin Rans (BEL)	5.35 m	0
NM	Damiel Dossévi (FRA)	No mark	0
NM	Raphael Holzdeppe (GER)	No mark	0

Triple jump
Place	Athlete	Mark	Points
1	Teddy Tamgho (FRA)	17.57 m (−0.2 m/s)	18 (+8)
2	Alexis Copello (CUB)	17.47 m (+0.2 m/s)	13 (+4)
3	Christian Olsson (SWE)	17.35 m (−0.2 m/s)	10 (+2)
4	Arnie David Giralt (CUB)	17.10 m (+0.1 m/s)	6
5	Benjamin Compaoré (FRA)	16.96 m (±0.0 m/s)	0
6	Nathan Douglas (GBR)	16.86 m (+0.6 m/s)	0
7	Marian Oprea (ROU)	16.83 m (+0.5 m/s)	0
8	Randy Lewis (GRN)	16.11 m (−0.2 m/s)	2
NM	Samyr Lainé (HAI)	No mark	0

Shot put
Place	Athlete	Mark	Points
1	Reese Hoffa (USA)	22.16 m MR	14 (+8)
2	Christian Cantwell (USA)	21.62 m	25 (+4)
3	Tomasz Majewski (POL)	21.44 m	7 (+2)
4	Dylan Armstrong (CAN)	20.87 m	6
5	Adam Nelson (USA)	20.26 m	1
6	Cory Martin (USA)	20.24 m	1
7	Dorian Scott (JAM)	19.20 m	0
8	Wim Blondeel (BEL)	18.15 m	0
NM	Daniel Taylor (USA)	No mark	0

Javelin throw
Place	Athlete	Mark	Points
1	Andreas Thorkildsen (NOR)	89.88 m	30 (+8)
2	Tero Pitkämäki (FIN)	83.36 m	13 (+4)
3	Matthias de Zordo (GER)	82.39 m	5 (+2)
4	Jarrod Bannister (AUS)	82.05 m	0
5	Teemu Wirkkala (FIN)	82.01 m	3
6	Ainārs Kovals (LAT)	81.45 m	0
7	Ari Mannio (FIN)	80.66 m	0
8	Petr Frydrych (CZE)	77.29 m	4
9	Oleksandr Pyatnytsya (UKR)	75.54 m	0
10	Till Wöschler (GER)	74.60 m	0

=== Women ===
200 m (+0.4 m/s)
Place	Athlete	Time	Points
1	Allyson Felix (USA)	22.61	22 (+8)
2	Shalonda Solomon (USA)	22.70	8 (+4)
3	Bianca Knight (USA)	23.01	4 (+2)
4	Aleksandra Fedoriva (RUS)	23.07	1
5	Kelly-Ann Baptiste (TTO)	23.26	0
6	Yelyzaveta Bryzhina (UKR)	23.28	0
7	Porscha Lucas (USA)	23.36	0
8	Olivia Borlée (BEL)	23.61	0
9	Consuella Moore (USA)	23.63	0

800 m
Place	Athlete	Time	Points
1	Janeth Jepkosgei (KEN)	1:58.82	17 (+8)
2	Caster Semenya (RSA)	1:59.65	2 (+2)
3	Alysia Johnson (USA)	1:59.89	8
4	Jenny Meadows (GBR)	1:59.93	3
5	Anna Pierce (USA)	2:00.05	1
6	Elisa Cusma-Piccione (ITA)	2:00.35	0
7	Tintu Lukka (IND)	2:00.79 PB	0
8	Jemma Simpson (GBR)	2:01.13	3
9	Neisha Bernard-Thomas (GRN)	2:01.75	0
DNF	Halima Hachlaf (MAR)	Did not finish	6
DNF (PM)	Karen Shinkins (IRL)	Did not finish (pacemaker)	0
DQ	Mariya Savinova (RUS)	Disqualified (doping)	0

5000 m
Place	Athlete	Time	Points
1	Vivian Cheruiyot (KEN)	14:34.13 WL	16 (+8)
2	Linet Chepkwemoi Masai (KEN)	14:35.07	6 (+4)
3	Sentayehu Ejigu (ETH)	14:35.13	15 (+2)
4	Sally Kipyego (KEN)	14:38.64 PB	0
5	Elvan Abeylegesse (TUR)	14:39.61	1
6	Sylvia Chibiwott Kibet (KEN)	14:39.80	0
7	Ines Chenonge (KEN)	14:43.14	0
8	Meselech Melkamu (ETH)	14:44.26	1
9	Molly Huddle (USA)	14:44.76 AR	0
10	Stephanie Twell (GBR)	14:54.08 PB	0
11	Mercy Cherono (KEN)	14:58.88	0
12	Esther Chemtai (KEN)	14:59.75	0
DNF	Lidia Chojecka (POL)	Did not finish	0
DNF (PM)	Lindsey De Grande (BEL)	Did not finish (pacemaker)	0
DNF (PM)	Zakia Mrisho Mohamed (TAN)	Did not finish (pacemaker)	0
DNF (PM)	Margaret Miriuki (KEN)	Did not finish (pacemaker)	0
DQ	Alemitu Bekele (TUR)	Disqualified (doping)	0

100 m hurdles (±0.0 m/s)
Place	Athlete	Time	Points
1	Priscilla Lopes-Schliep (CAN)	12.54	22 (+8)
2	Sally Pearson (AUS)	12.64	10 (+4)
3	Perdita Felicien (CAN)	12.68	5 (+2)
4	Queen Harrison (USA)	12.69	0
5	Lolo Jones (USA)	12.78	14
6	Danielle Carruthers (USA)	12.93	0
7	Derval O'Rourke (IRL)	12.96	0
8	Christina Vukicevic (NOR)	13.21	0
9	Elisabeth Davin (BEL)	13.34	0

3000 m steeplechase
Place	Athlete	Time	Points
1	Sofia Assefa (ETH)	9:20.72	9 (+8)
2	Milcah Chemos Cheiywa (KEN)	9:22.34	24 (+4)
3	Almaz Ayana (ETH)	9:22.51 WJR	2 (+2)
4	Mekdes Bekele (ETH)	9:24.17	0
5	Lisa Aguilera (USA)	9:24.84 PB	0
6	Lydia Jebet Rotich (KEN)	9:29.24	5
7	Katarzyna Kowalska (POL)	9:33.79	0
8	Birtukan Adamu (ETH)	9:45.06	0
9	Korene Hinds (JAM)	9:54.37	0
DNF	Sophie Duarte (FRA)	Did not finish	0
DNF (PM)	Mardrea Hyman (JAM)	Did not finish (pacemaker)	0

High jump
Place	Athlete	Mark	Points
1	Blanka Vlašić (CRO)	2.00 m	32 (+8)
2	Antonietta Di Martino (ITA)	1.98 m	4 (+4)
3	Emma Green (SWE)	1.98 m	3 (+2)
4	Ruth Beitia (ESP)	1.92 m	3
5	Svetlana Shkolina (RUS)	1.92 m	1
6	Irina Gordeyeva (RUS)	1.86 m	1
7	Levern Spencer (LCA)	1.86 m	2
8	Ana Šimić (CRO)	1.80 m	0
NM	Hanne Van Hessche (BEL)	No mark	0

Triple jump
Place	Athlete	Mark	Points
1	Olga Rypakova (KAZ)	14.80 m (−0.9 m/s)	22 (+8)
2	Yargelis Savigne (CUB)	14.56 m (−0.8 m/s)	22 (+4)
3	Olha Saladukha (UKR)	14.38 m (+0.3 m/s)	4 (+2)
4	Dana Velďáková (SVK)	14.19 m (−0.8 m/s)	0
5	Snežana Vukmirovič-Rodič (SLO)	14.16 m (−0.2 m/s)	0
6	Svetlana Bolshakova (BEL)	14.04 m (+0.8 m/s)	1
7	Nadezhda Alekhina (RUS)	13.74 m (±0.0 m/s)	4
8	Anna Pyatykh (RUS)	13.73 m (±0.0 m/s)	2
9	Adelina Gavrilă (ROU)	13.61 m (±0.0 m/s)	0

Discus throw
Place	Athlete	Mark	Points
1	Sandra Perković (CRO)	66.93 m NR	16 (+8)
2	Yarelis Barrios (CUB)	65.96 m	20 (+4)
3	Li Yanfeng (CHN)	64.74 m	2 (+2)
4	Dani Samuels (AUS)	62.13 m	3
5	Nicoleta Grasu (ROU)	61.68 m	3
6	Aretha Thurmond (USA)	61.58 m	3
7	Becky Breisch (USA)	59.77 m	2
8	Joanna Wiśniewska (POL)	58.42 m	0

== See also ==
- 2010 Weltklasse Zürich (previous meet and first half of the 2010 IAAF Diamond League final)
