= Darvis Patton =

American sprinter (born 1977)

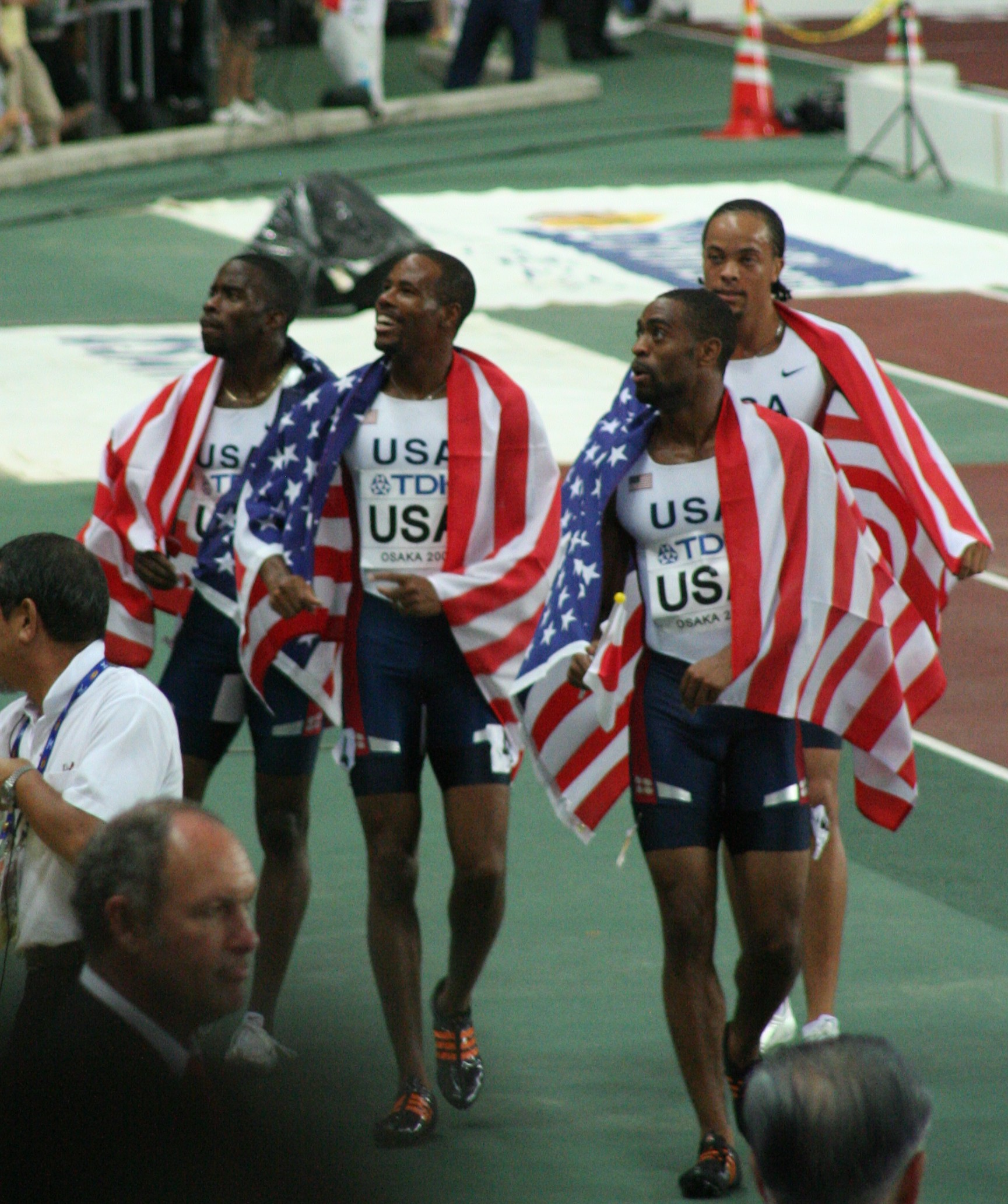
- Patton (second left) after his 2007 World 4×100 m relay gold

Personal information
- Born: December 4, 1977 (age 48) Dallas, Texas, U.S.
- Height: 6 ft 0 in (1.83 m)
- Weight: 180 lb (82 kg)

Sport
- Sport: Track and field
- Events: 100-meter dash, 200-meter dash, long jump
- College team: Texas Christian University and Garden City Community College

Achievements and titles
- Personal bests: 100 m: 9.89; 200 m: 20.03
Medal record
Men's athletics
Representing the United States
Olympic Games
Silver medal – second place	2012 London	4 × 100 m relay
Silver medal – second place	2004 Athens	4 × 100 m relay
World Championships
Gold medal – first place	2003 Paris	4 × 100 m relay
Gold medal – first place	2007 Osaka	4 × 100 m relay
Silver medal – second place	2003 Paris	200 m
Pan American Games
Silver medal – second place	2007 Rio de Janeiro	100 m
Bronze medal – third place	2007 Rio de Janeiro	4 × 100 m relay

Darvis "Doc" Darell Patton (born December 4, 1977) is an American retired track and field athlete who competed in sprinting events. He is a two-time US Champion in the 200-meter dash and won the silver medal in the event at the 2003 World Championships. He is a three-time Olympian and a four-time participant at the World Athletics Championships.

Patton has had much success with the American 4 × 100-meter relay team, being a world gold medallist in 2003 and 2007, as well as an Olympic silver medallist (2004). He has also had misfortune in the relay, having been involved in the American team's disqualification at the 2008 Summer Olympics, the 2009 World Championships, and the 2011 World Championships.

A multi-talented athlete in the horizontal jumps and sprints, he initially focused on the 200 m but, after missing 2005 and 2006 due to injury, he switched to the 100-meter dash. He won the 100 m silver medal at the 2007 Pan American Games and reached the finals of the event at the 2008 Summer Olympics and the 2009 World Championships. He has broken the 10-second barrier and his personal record of 9.89 seconds places him within the top-ten fastest Americans in the event. He also has bests of 20.03 for the 200 m, 8.12 m for the long jump, and 6.50 seconds for the 60-meter dash (a masters record for over-35 runners).

== Career ==
=== Early career and college ===
Born in Dallas, Texas, the son of William Johnson and Dorrise Patton, Darvis Patton was a very versatile athlete from a young age and he competed in the long jump, triple jump and sprint events at Lake Highlands High School and TCU days. At the AAU Junior Olympic Games in 1998 he won the long jump, was runner-up in the triple jump and placed fourth in the 200-meter dash. He graduated from Garden City Community College that year and won an athletic scholarship at Texas Christian University. While there he began to focus more on the 100-meter dash and 200 m under the coaching of Monte Stratton. He was a finalist at both those distances at the 2000 NCAA Men's Outdoor Track and Field Championship. He ended the year with personal records of 6.64 seconds for the 60-meter dash, 10.22 for the 100 m, 20.29 for the 200 m and 8.04 m (26 ft 4 1/2 in) for the long jump. He was also a semi-finalist in the 200 m at the 2000 United States Olympic Trials.

In his second year of competition at Texas Christian he set lifetime indoor bests of 20.73 for the 200 m and 7.85 m (25 ft 9 in) for the long jump. He was a finalist in both events at the NCAA Men's Indoor Track and Field Championship. He improved outdoors too, setting personal records of 10.16 seconds for the 100 m and 8.12 m (26 ft 7 1/2 in) for the long jump in Arlington, Texas. The 2001 NCAA Outdoor Championships saw him earn four All-American honours in one meet: he was sixth in the 100 m, fourth in the long jump, third in the 200 m and won the 4 × 100-meter relay with the TCU Horned Frogs. He began to establish himself nationally at that year's USA Outdoor Track and Field Championships, where he came fourth in the 200 m as well as seventh in the long jump. Patton was later upgraded to third in the 200 m after Ramon Clay was banned for doping.

=== First World and Olympic medals ===
He had his first successes as a senior in 2002 when he was runner up in the 200 m at both the Indoor and Outdoor US Championships. The retrospective disqualification of Ramon Clay meant he was the American outdoor 200 m champion that year. There were no global track championships that year so he mainly competed on the international circuit. He won the 200 m races in Glasgow and London and was runner-up at the Golden Gala and Memorial Van Damme meets. He improved his 200 m best to 20.12 seconds in Brussels.

The following season saw him reach the global podium for the first time: he became the national champion in the 200 m and went on to win the silver medal in that event at the 2003 World Championships in Athletics behind teammate John Capel. He also won a gold medal as part of the American men's 4 × 100 m relay team including Capel, Bernard Williams and J. J. Johnson. Moving entirely away from the long jump, Patton's sprinting times all improved that year: he had a personal record of 6.58 seconds in the 60 m, ran ten seconds flat at the Weltklasse Zürich meeting and ran 20.03 in the World Championships 200 m semi-finals. On the circuit he was runner-up at the Athletissima and Meeting Gaz de France 200 m races and placed fourth at the 2003 IAAF World Athletics Final.

After a fourth-place finish in the 200 m at the 2004 US Olympic Trials, he was nominated as the substitute for the 4 × 100 m relay at the 2004 Summer Olympics. Patton helped the American team ease through the heats, recording a time of 38.02 seconds. He was substituted for the newly crowned 100 m Olympic champion Justin Gatlin for the final race, but the move backfired for the team as they finished a little slower (38.08) and had to settle for the silver medal behind Great Britain – who they had easily beaten in the heats. Patton's 2005 and 2006 seasons were wrecked by significant groin and hip injuries and he only returned to major competitions in 2007.

=== Return from injury ===
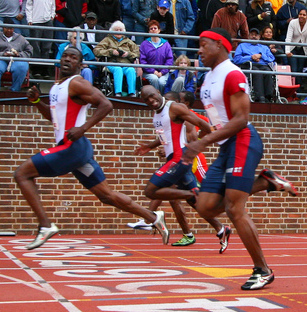
Patton winning at the 2008 Penn Relays

Patton returned to action and focused on the shorter sprint distance that year. He finished eighth in the 100 m final at the 2007 US Championships and withdrew from the 200 m competition. Based on his performance, he was selected to represent the United States at the 2007 Pan American Games. He finished second in the 100 m behind Churandy Martina and anchored the relay team to a bronze medal. He was chosen as part of the relay team for the 2007 World Championships and this time made the final after qualifying. The American team (with Wallace Spearmon, Tyson Gay, and Leroy Dixon) became the world champions in a world-leading time of 37.78 seconds, fending off the Jamaican challengers who set a national record.

At the 2008 United States Olympic Trials, Patton achieved his lifetime best performance in the 100 m, running 9.89 seconds in the quarter-finals. He went even quicker in the wind-assisted (+3.1 m/s) final, clocking 9.84 seconds, and came in third place behind Tyson Gay and Walter Dix. He broke the 10-second barrier legally for the second time at the Herculis meet in Monaco, placing second behind Asafa Powell in 9.98 seconds. During the 2008 Summer Olympics in Beijing he was the slowest qualifier for the 100 m final. In the final itself he ran 10.03 seconds and was again the slowest and thus the eighth placed athlete. Together with Rodney Martin, Travis Padgett and Tyson Gay he also competed at the 4 × 100 m relay, but they did not finish due to a mistake in the baton exchange between Patton and Gay and they were eliminated.

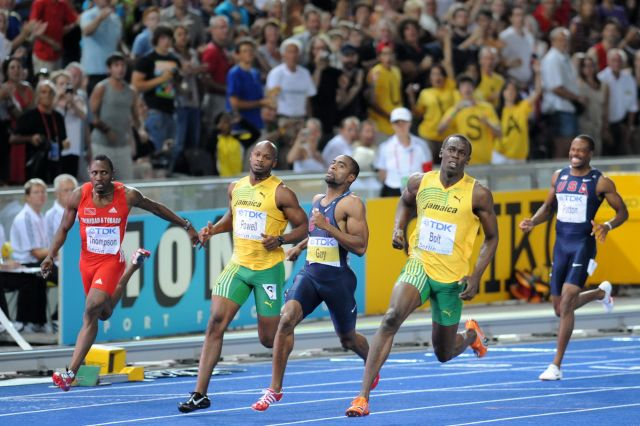
Patton (far right) grimacing in injury at the 2009 World Championships 100 m final.

The following year Patton came second to Michael Rodgers in a close 100 m race at the 2009 US championships in June, running a windy 9.92 seconds. This won him a place on the American team for the 2009 World Championships in Athletics. Prior to the event, he was runner-up in Monaco and in Stockholm – running a wind-assisted 9.95 seconds behind Tyson Gay at the latter. He managed to reach the final of the men's 100 meters after scoring a season's best of 9.98 in the semi-finals. He performed poorly in the final however, finishing last with a slow time of 10.34 seconds due to an injury. The hopes of the American men's relay team were again dashed by an illegal baton exchange, this time between Patton and Shawn Crawford. Patton ended his season on a high: he ran a series of sub-10 runs including 9.95 for third at the Weltklasse, 9.94 to win the Hanžeković Memorial, and a personal record-equalling run of 9.89 seconds for third at the Shanghai Golden Grand Prix, behind Tyson Gay and Asafa Powell. He also placed third in the 100 m at the Memorial Van Damme and the 2009 IAAF World Athletics Final.

=== Second Olympic medal ===
Patton's 2010 season was brought to an end in May due to another injury. He returned in 2011 and began racing more frequently in the 200 m. At the 2011 USA Outdoor Track and Field Championships he was sixth in the 100 m but managed second place to Walter Dix in the 200 m. The 2011 World Championships in Athletics was one of his less successful global outings. He was eliminated in the 200 m semi-finals and in the relay final he clashed with Britain's Harry Aikines-Aryeetey and failed to pass the baton successfully. He had season's bests of 9.94 seconds for the 100 m and 20.25 seconds for the 200 m.

The 2012 United States Olympic Trials he placed fifth in both the 100 m and 200 m. Although he had failed to gain an individual spot, he was chosen for the relay team. At the 2012 London Olympics he ran as a substitute runner in the qualifiers but even the weaker American team of Jeff Demps, Patton, Trell Kimmons, and Justin Gatlin broke the national record of 37.38 seconds. The American team for the final (bringing in Tyson Gay and Ryan Bailey) improved that record further to 37.04 seconds but was still second behind the world record-breaking Jamaican team. Patton received his second Olympic silver medal in the relay as a result.

He began 2013 with quick times, running 6.50 for the 60 m (a world record for over-35 athletes) and a wind-aided 100 m time of 9.75 seconds.

== USATF Athlete's Advisory Committee & Board of Directors ==
Patton announced his retirement in 2013 on Instagram and went on to pursue coaching. Before hanging up his spikes, Patton served as the Men's Sprints Event Leader on the USATF Athlete's Advisory Committee. In this role, he advocated for elite sprint athletes and was the primary point of contact for competition issues, questions regarding tier privileges, benefits, and provided the men's constituency with updates on competition site selections and changes to USATF rules and regulations.

Thereafter, the veteran sprinter's peers elected him to a four-year term as a member of the USATF Board of Directors, again representing the Athlete's Advisory Committee. There, he reviewed event constituent budgets as member of the budget committee to ensure efficient, appropriate use and allocation of funds in accordance with USATF policy. He also helped ensure athletes in all track and field disciplines had access to unified representation in various aspects of USATF, including staff selections, drug testing and competition rules.

== Coaching ==
In 2015, Darvis served as the assistant sprint and hurdles coach for the USA Track and Field delegation for the IAAF World Relay Championship and NACAC Senior Championship relay teams, bringing home ten medals in the process and an additional four medals from Penn Relays. He also served as the head track coach at All Saints Episcopal School in Fort Worth from 2019 to 2022, where the program broke school records in the high jump, 4x100 meter race, placed fourth in the 2015 state championship – the highest place finish in the school's 70-year history – and produced the school's first state champion in the men's 100 m dash.

Patton joined the Texas Wesleyan University staff in March 2022 as the assistant track and field coach where he specializes in short sprints and jumps. In his first two years, Patton helped lead the men's and women's track team to their first conference titles in school history and produced Texas Wesleyan's first national track and field champion in the 400 m, 60 m hurdles and 110 m hurdles. In 2023, the United States Track & Field and Cross Country Coaches Association named Darvis Patton the National Association of Intercollegiate Athletics Assistant Coach of the Year for Women's Outdoor Track & Field in the South Central Region. He was promoted to associate head coach for the Texas Wesleyan track and field program in 2024.

== Personal life ==
He and his wife Crystal have a daughter, Dakota, and son, Darvis II. He is a former member of Big Brothers Big Sisters of America and serves as a youth mentor.

== Personal bests ==
Event	Time (sec)	Venue	Date
60-meter dash	6.50	New York City, United States	February 17, 2013
100-meter dash	9.89	Eugene, Oregon, United States	June 28, 2008
200-meter dash	20.03	Saint-Denis, France	August 28, 2003
Long jump	8.12 m	Arlington, Texas, United States	March 31, 2001

- All information taken from IAAF profile.

== Competition record ==
Year	Competition	Venue	Position	Notes
2003	World Championships	Paris, France	2nd	200 m
2003	World Championships	Paris, France	1st	4 × 100 m relay
2003	World Athletics Final	Monaco	4th	200 m
2004	Summer Olympics	Athens, Greece	2nd	4 × 100 m relay (heats)
2007	Pan American Games	Rio de Janeiro, Brazil	2nd	100 m
2007	Pan American Games	Rio de Janeiro, Brazil	3rd	4 × 100 m relay
2007	World Championships	Osaka, Japan	1st	4 × 100 m relay
2008	Summer Olympics	Beijing, China	8th	100 m
2008	Summer Olympics	Beijing, China	DQ	4 × 100 m relay
2009	World Championships	Berlin, Germany	8th	100 m
2009	World Championships	Berlin, Germany	DQ (heats)	4 × 100 m relay
2012	Olympic Games	London, United Kingdom	2nd	4 × 100 m relay
