= Leroy Dixon =

American sprinter

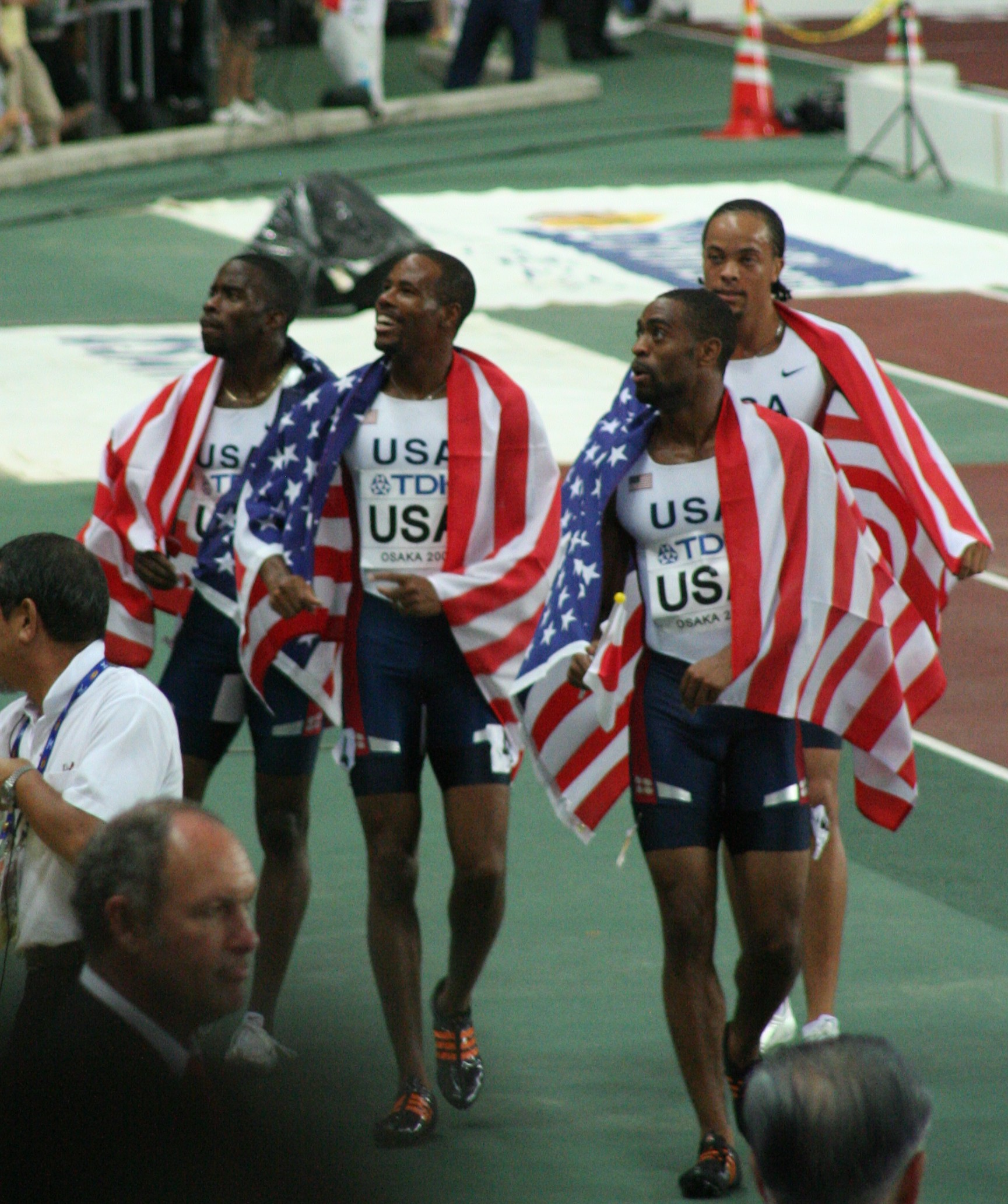
- Dixon (far left) after his 2007 World 4 × 100 m relay gold

Personal information
- Nationality: American
- Born: June 20, 1983 (age 43) South Bend, Indiana, U.S.
- Height: 5 ft 10 in (178 cm)
- Weight: 158 lb (72 kg)

Sport
- Sport: Running
- College team: University of South Carolina
- Club: Nike

Achievements and titles
- Personal bests: 100 m: 10.02; 200 m: 20.44
Medal record
Men's athletics (track and field)
Representing United States
World Championships
Gold medal – first place	2007 Osaka	4 × 100 m relay

Leroy Dixon (born June 20, 1983) is an American sprinter who specializes in the 100 metres.

He won the gold medal in 4 × 100 metres relay at the 2007 World Championships, together with Darvis Patton, Wallace Spearmon and Tyson Gay. Individually, he competed in 60 metres at the 2008 World Indoor Championships without reaching the final.

His personal best time over 100 metres is 10.02 seconds, achieved in June 2008 in Eugene. His personal best time over 60 metres is 6.56 seconds, achieved in February 2008 in Boston. In the 200 metres, he has run 20.44 seconds, achieved in June 2006 in Indianapolis.

Dixon lettered in football, basketball, and track & field throughout high school at the former LaSalle High School, South Bend, Indiana. His notoriety as a student-athlete was furthered at the University of South Carolina, where he majored in criminal justice. There, he earned an All-American honors and was an NCAA finalist.

In 2007, he signed with Hudson-Smith International (HSI) Agency through talent agent, Emmanuel Hudson. He trained under the roof of the UCLA field with John Smith, a sports guru and coaching legend who holds the record for coaching the most Olympic gold medalists in track & field, such as Maurice Greene, Quincy Watts, and Ato Boldon.

In 2007, Dixon won the gold medal in 4 × 100 relay in Osaka, Japan. He was ranked 4th in the U.S. and 6th in the world in the 100 meters.

In 2008, he was a U.S. Indoor runner-up and qualified for the Indoor World Championships. He also qualified for the Beijing Olympics, despite being in a cast just 4 weeks before the Olympic trials due to a stress fracture in his fibula. He was ranked 8th in the world and 4th in the U.S. in the 100 meters.

In 2009, he made the outdoor world championship team but could not participate due to injuries. He ranked 6th in the U.S. in the 100 meters.

In 2010, he was ranked 5th in the U.S. and 10th in the world in the 100 meters.

Dixon was awarded a street name and the keys to his hometown of South Bend, Indiana. He has traveled to over 40 countries and enjoys mentoring up-and-coming athletes around the world.

Currently, he serves as the face and spokesperson for the Blink Campaign, a national awareness campaign for HIV & Aids. He is also a strong advocate for safety and prevention of diseases, especially cancer, as his Mother was diagnosed with breast cancer in 2008.

In 2011 Dixon signed with Icon Management under Kimberly Holland, who is best recognized for managing the most gold medalists in the 2008 Olympics. He also trains under a new coach, Bob Kersee, whose expertise produced talents such as Florence Griffith Joyner, Gail Devers, and Jackie Joyner-Kersee.
