= 2010 Weltklasse Zürich =

- Dates: 18–19 August
- Host city: Zürich, Switzerland
- Venue: Letzigrund
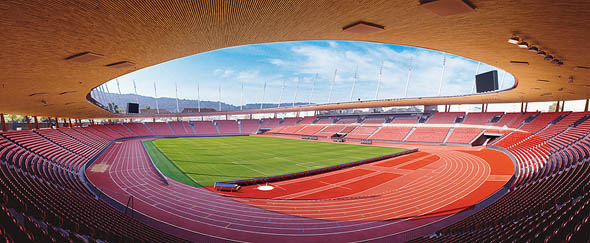
- Level: 2010 IAAF Diamond League
- Events: 29 (16 Diamond League)

The 2010 Weltklasse Zürich was an outdoor track and field meeting in Zürich, Switzerland. Held on 18–19 August at the Letzigrund, it was the thirteenth leg of the inaugural IAAF Diamond League – the highest level international track and field circuit – and the first half of the final for 2010 (the second half being held during the Memorial Van Damme in Brussels, Belgium on 27 August). The women's shot put was held at Zürich Main Station on the 18th, with the rest of the events following on the 19th at the Letzigrund.

== Diamond League champions ==
Men		Women	
Athlete	Event	Athlete	Event
Wallace Spearmon (USA)	200 m	Carmelita Jeter (USA)	100 m
Jeremy Wariner (USA)	400 m	Allyson Felix (USA)	400 m
Imane Merga (ETH)	5000 m	Nancy Jebet Langat (KEN)	1500 m
David Oliver (USA)	110 m hurdles	Kaliese Spencer (JAM)	400 m hurdles
Paul Kipsiele Koech (KEN)	3000 m steeplechase	Fabiana Murer (BRA)	Pole vault
Ivan Ukhov (RUS)	High jump	Brittney Reese (USA)	Long jump
Dwight Phillips (USA)	Long jump	Valerie Adams (NZL)	Shot put
Piotr Małachowski (POL)	Discus throw	Barbora Špotáková (CZE)	Javelin throw

Belarusian athlete Nadezhda Ostapchuk originally won the women's shot put with the most points and was declared champion. After retests of Ostapchuk's samples from prior competitions showed multiple doping offenses, she was disqualified and New Zealander Valerie Adams, who had finished second at the meet and in points, was recognized as the champion.

== Records ==
The following records were set at the meet:

Type	Athlete	Event	Mark
Meeting	Wallace Spearmon (USA)	Men's 200 m	19.79
British	Mo Farah (GBR)	Men's 5000 m	12:57.94
Trinbagonian	Cleopatra Borel-Brown (TTO)	Women's shot put	19.09 m
Meeting	Christina Obergföll (GER)	Women's javelin throw	67.31 m

American athlete Jeremy Wariner also ran a world leading 44.13 in the men's 400 m, the fastest time in 2010.

Belarusian athlete Nadezhda Ostapchuk originally threw a meeting record 20.63 m in the women's shot put, but the mark was later annulled for doping.

== Diamond League results ==
=== Men ===
200 m (+0.4 m/s)
Place	Athlete	Time	Points
1	Wallace Spearmon (USA)	19.79 MR	13 (+8)
2	Yohan Blake (JAM)	19.86	6 (+4)
3	Ryan Bailey (USA)	20.10 PB	4 (+2)
4	Steve Mullings (JAM)	20.11	0
5	Jaysuma Saidy Ndure (NOR)	20.29	1
6	Xavier Carter (USA)	20.38	1
7	Churandy Martina (AHO)	20.40	2
8	Marc Schneeberger (SUI)	20.55	0

400 m
Place	Athlete	Time	Points
1	Jeremy Wariner (USA)	44.13 WL	28 (+8)
2	Jermaine Gonzales (JAM)	44.51	14 (+4)
3	Angelo Taylor (USA)	44.72	4 (+2)
4	Ricardo Chambers (JAM)	44.96	3
5	Jonathan Borlée (BEL)	45.23	2
6	Martyn Rooney (GBR)	45.67	0
7	Michael Bingham (GBR)	46.00	1
8	David Gillick (IRL)	46.05	0

5000 m
Place	Athlete	Time	Points
1	Tariku Bekele (ETH)	12:55.03	14 (+8)
2	Imane Merga (ETH)	12:56.34	16 (+4)
3	Chris Solinsky (USA)	12:56.45 PB	2 (+2)
4	Vincent Kiprop Chepkok (KEN)	12:57.77	6
5	Mo Farah (GBR)	12:57.94 NR	0
6	Edwin Cheruiyot Soi (KEN)	12:58.91	0
7	Moses Ndiema Masai (KEN)	13:02.45	0
8	Vincent Yator (KEN)	13:04.50 PB	0
9	Lucas Kimeli Rotich (KEN)	13:04.85	0
10	David Kiprotich Bett (KEN)	13:06.96 PB	0
11	Eliud Kipchoge (KEN)	13:07.06	6
12	Galen Rupp (USA)	13:07.35 PB	0
13	Titus Mbishei (KEN)	13:13.81	0
14	Jacob Kirui Chesari (KEN)	13:15.93	0
15	Sammy Alex Mutahi (KEN)	13:16.60	2
16	Christopher Thompson (GBR)	13:28.43	0
DNF	Mark Kosgei Kiptoo (KEN)	Did not finish	4
DNF (PM)	Bethwell Birgen (KEN)	Did not finish (pacemaker)	0
DNF (PM)	Daniel Kipchirchir Komen (KEN)	Did not finish (pacemaker)	0

110 m hurdles (−0.3 m/s)
Place	Athlete	Time	Points
1	David Oliver (USA)	12.93	28 (+8)
2	Dwight Thomas (JAM)	13.25	9 (+4)
3	Ryan Wilson (USA)	13.26	8 (+2)
4	Petr Svoboda (CZE)	13.30	0
5	Joel Brown (USA)	13.31	0
6	Garfield Darien (FRA)	13.34 =PB	1
7	Jason Richardson (USA)	13.34	0
8	Andy Turner (GBR)	13.36	0
9	William Sharman (GBR)	13.51	0

3000 m steeplechase
Place	Athlete	Time	Points
1	Ezekiel Kemboi (KEN)	8:01.74	15 (+8)
2	Paul Kipsiele Koech (KEN)	8:05.54	17 (+4)
3	Bouabdallah Tahri (FRA)	8:07.20	2 (+2)
4	Benjamin Kiplagat (UGA)	8:08.70	2
5	Richard Kipkemboi Mateelong (KEN)	8:09.25	0
6	Saif Saaeed Shaheen (QAT)	8:09.64	0
7	Brimin Kiprop Kipruto (KEN)	8:10.02	10
8	Mahiedine Mekhissi-Benabbad (FRA)	8:10.50	0
9	Ion Luchianov (MDA)	8:19.91	0
10	Tomasz Szymkowiak (POL)	8:24.58	0
11	Silas Kosgei Kitum (KEN)	8:25.82	0
12	Daniel Huling (USA)	8:36.66	0
DNF	Patrick Langat (KEN)	Did not finish	3
DNF (PM)	Elijah Chelimo (KEN)	Did not finish (pacemaker)	0
DNF (PM)	Haron Lagat (KEN)	Did not finish (pacemaker)	0
DQ	José Luis Blanco (ESP)	Disqualified (doping)	0

High jump
Place	Athlete	Mark	Points
1	Ivan Ukhov (RUS)	2.29 m	20 (+8)
2	Jesse Williams (USA)	2.26 m	13 (+4)
3	Aleksandr Shustov (RUS)	2.26 m	2 (+2)
4	Aleksey Dmitrik (RUS)	2.26 m	0
5	Yaroslav Rybakov (RUS)	2.26 m	2
6	Donald Thomas (BAH)	2.26 m	1
7	Oleksandr Nartov (UKR)	2.23 m	0
8	Martyn Bernard (GBR)	2.20 m	0
9	Jaroslav Bába (CZE)	2.20 m	0
10	Dusty Jonas (USA)	2.15 m	0

Long jump
Place	Athlete	Mark	Points
1	Dwight Phillips (USA)	8.20 m (−0.3 m/s)	24 (+8)
2	Christian Reif (GER)	8.11 m (−0.1 m/s)	4 (+4)
3	Chris Tomlinson (GBR)	7.97 m (+0.2 m/s)	3 (+2)
4	Pavel Shalin (RUS)	7.88 m (±0.0 m/s)	1
5	Andrew Howe (ITA)	7.88 m (−0.2 m/s)	0
6	Salim Sdiri (FRA)	7.84 m (+0.2 m/s)	0
7	Kafétien Gomis (FRA)	7.29 m (−0.9 m/s)	0
NM	Fabrice Lapierre (AUS)	No mark	11

Discus throw
Place	Athlete	Mark	Points
1	Robert Harting (GER)	68.64 m	10 (+8)
2	Piotr Małachowski (POL)	68.48 m	18 (+4)
3	Mario Pestano (ESP)	66.49 m	2 (+2)
4	Zoltán Kővágó (HUN)	65.32 m	13
5	Gerd Kanter (EST)	65.20 m	10
6	Casey Malone (USA)	64.49 m	1
7	Virgilijus Alekna (LTU)	64.39 m	1
8	Jason Young (USA)	62.87 m	1
9	Märt Israel (EST)	62.64 m	0

=== Women ===
100 m (±0.0 m/s)
Place	Athlete	Time	Points
1	Veronica Campbell-Brown (JAM)	10.89	14 (+8)
2	Carmelita Jeter (USA)	10.89	21 (+4)
3	Marshevet Myers (USA)	10.97	2 (+2)
4	Kelly-Ann Baptiste (TTO)	11.11	3
5	Sherone Simpson (JAM)	11.18	3
6	Blessing Okagbare (NGR)	11.19	0
7	Verena Sailer (GER)	11.25	0
8	Ezinne Okparaebo (NOR)	11.45	0
9	Myriam Soumaré (FRA)	11.56	0

400 m
Place	Athlete	Time	Points
1	Allyson Felix (USA)	50.37	20 (+8)
2	Debbie Dunn (USA)	50.57	10 (+4)
3	Amantle Montsho (BOT)	50.63	10 (+2)
4	Shericka Williams (JAM)	50.73	5
5	Novlene Williams-Mills (JAM)	50.80	4
6	Libania Grenot (ITA)	51.07	0
7	Kseniya Ustalova (RUS)	52.07	0
DQ	Tatyana Firova (RUS)	Disqualified (doping)	0

1500 m
Place	Athlete	Time	Points
1	Nancy Jebet Langat (KEN)	4:01.01	25 (+8)
2	Gelete Burka (ETH)	4:02.26	11 (+4)
3	Stephanie Twell (GBR)	4:02.54 PB	2 (+2)
4	Lisa Dobriskey (GBR)	4:02.92	3
5	Irene Jelagat (KEN)	4:03.76	0
6	Janeth Jepkosgei (KEN)	4:04.17 PB	0
7	Abeba Aregawi (ETH)	4:05.05	1
8	Shannon Rowbury (USA)	4:05.48	0
9	Viola Kibiwot (ETH)	4:06.13	0
10	Christin Wurth-Thomas (USA)	4:09.37	4
DNF	Anna Pierce (USA)	Did not finish	0
DNF	Morgan Uceny (USA)	Did not finish	0
DNF (PM)	Mimi Belete (BHR)	Did not finish (pacemaker)	2
DNF (PM)	Diane Cummins (CAN)	Did not finish (pacemaker)	0
DQ	Anna Alminova (RUS)	Disqualified (doping)	0
DQ	Aslı Çakır Alptekin (TUR)	Disqualified (doping)	0

400 m hurdles
Place	Athlete	Time	Points
1	Kaliese Spencer (JAM)	53.33 PB	24 (+8)
2	Zuzana Hejnová (CZE)	54.54	8 (+4)
3	Ajoke Odumosu (NGR)	55.11	2 (+2)
4	Natalya Antyukh (RUS)	55.14	5
5	Eilidh Child (GBR)	55.57	1
6	Angela Moroșanu (ROU)	56.43	1
7	Queen Harrison (USA)	56.68	0
8	Yevgeniya Isakova (RUS)	59.87	0

Pole vault
Place	Athlete	Mark	Points
1	Fabiana Murer (BRA)	4.81 m	23 (+8)
2	Svetlana Feofanova (RUS)	4.71 m	14 (+4)
3	Silke Spiegelburg (GER)	4.61 m	11 (+2)
4	Lacy Janson (USA)	4.51 m	2
5	Lisa Ryzih (GER)	4.51 m	0
6	Carolin Hingst (GER)	4.41 m	0
7	Yuliya Golubchikova (RUS)	4.41 m	1
8	Jiřina Ptáčníková (CZE)	4.41 m	2
9	Anna Katharina Schmid (SUI)	4.21 m	0
NM	Anastasiya Shvedova (BLR)	No mark	0

Long jump
Place	Athlete	Mark	Points
1	Brittney Reese (USA)	6.89 m (−0.1 m/s)	28 (+8)
2	Lyudmila Kolchanova (RUS)	6.73 m (+0.1 m/s)	6 (+4)
3	Irène Pusterla (SUI)	6.70 m (−0.5 m/s)	2 (+2)
4	Naide Gomes (POR)	6.67 m (+0.2 m/s)	7
5	Ineta Radēviča (LAT)	6.57 m (−0.3 m/s)	0
6	Darya Klishina (RUS)	6.54 m (±0.0 m/s)	9
7	Hyleas Fountain (USA)	6.50 m (−0.1 m/s)	1
8	Brianna Glenn (USA)	6.45 m (+0.1 m/s)	4
9	Funmi Jimoh (USA)	6.37 m (−0.2 m/s)	1

Shot put
Place	Athlete	Mark	Points
1	Valerie Adams (NZL)	20.02 m	18 (+4)
2	Jillian Camarena (USA)	19.50 m PB	3 (+2)
3	Cleopatra Borel-Brown (TTO)	19.09 m NR	0
4	Misleydis González (CUB)	18.83 m	0
5	Nadine Kleinert (GER)	18.55 m	1
6	Michelle Carter (USA)	18.20 m	0
7	Denise Hinrichs (GER)	17.96 m	0
8	Olga Ivanova (RUS)	17.78 m	0
DQ	Nadezhda Ostapchuk (BLR)	Disqualified (doping)	0
DQ	Natalya Mikhnevich (BLR)	Disqualified (doping)	0

Javelin throw
Place	Athlete	Mark	Points
1	Christina Obergföll (GER)	67.31 m MR	8 (+8)
2	Barbora Špotáková (CZE)	65.34 m	20 (+4)
3	Linda Stahl (GER)	63.30 m	3 (+2)
4	Katharina Molitor (GER)	62.21 m	0
5	Madara Palameika (LAT)	61.75 m	0
6	Sunette Viljoen (RSA)	59.95 m	7
7	Vira Rebryk (UKR)	59.78 m	1
8	Kara Patterson (USA)	59.50 m	10
DQ	Mariya Abakumova (RUS)	Disqualified (doping)	0

== See also ==
- 2010 Memorial Van Damme (second half of the Diamond League final)
