= List of European Games records in athletics =

The European Games is a quadrennial event which began in 2015. The Games records in athletics are the best marks set in competitions at the Games.

== Men's records ==
Event	Record	Name	Nationality	Date	Games	Place	Ref.
100 m	10.60 (±0.0 m/s)	Thomas Benko	Slovakia	21 June 2015	2015 Games	Baku, Azerbaijan	
200 m	21.08 (−0.5 m/s)	Jan Volko	Slovakia	22 June 2015	2015 Games	Baku, Azerbaijan	
400 m	45.75	Donald Sanford	Israel	21 June 2015	2015 Games	Baku, Azerbaijan	
800 m	1:50.16	Amel Tuka	Bosnia and Herzegovina	22 June 2015	2015 Games	Baku, Azerbaijan	
1500 m	3:49.69	Haile Ibrahimov	Azerbaijan	21 June 2015	2015 Games	Baku, Azerbaijan	
3000 m	7:54.14	Haile Ibrahimov	Azerbaijan	22 June 2015	2015 Games	Baku, Azerbaijan	
5000 m	14:02.16	Haile Ibrahimov	Azerbaijan	21 June 2015	2015 Games	Baku, Azerbaijan	
110 m hurdles	14.07 (+0.2 m/s)	Dominik Siedlaczek	Austria	22 June 2015	2015 Games	Baku, Azerbaijan	
400 m hurdles	50.70	Martin Kucera	Slovakia	21 June 2015	2015 Games	Baku, Azerbaijan	
3000 m steeplechase	8:49.83	Nicolai Gorbusco	Romania	22 June 2015	2015 Games	Baku, Azerbaijan	
High jump	2.26 m	Matus Bubenik	Slovakia	21 June 2015	2015 Games	Baku, Azerbaijan	
Pole vault	5.15 m	Jan Smoray	Slovakia	22 June 2015	2015 Games	Baku, Azerbaijan	
Long jump	7.64 m (−0.1 m/s)	Bachana Khorava	Georgia	21 June 2015	2015 Games	Baku, Azerbaijan	
Triple jump	16.38 (−0.6 m/s)	Nazim Babayev	Azerbaijan	22 June 2015	2015 Games	Baku, Azerbaijan	
Shot put	20.26 m	Hamza Alić	Bosnia and Herzegovina	21 June 2015	2015 Games	Baku, Azerbaijan	
Discus throw	59.48 m	Gerhard Meyer	Austria	22 June 2015	2015 Games	Baku, Azerbaijan	
Hammer throw	75.41 m	Marcel Lomnicki	Slovakia	21 June 2015	2015 Games	Baku, Azerbaijan	
Javelin throw	74.89 m	Patrik Zenuch	Slovakia	22 June 2015	2015 Games	Baku, Azerbaijan	
4 × 100 m relay	40.25	Amir Hamidulin; Aviv Dayan; Amit Cohen; Imri Persiado	Israel	21 June 2015	2015 Games	Baku, Azerbaijan	
4 × 400 m relay	3:08.80	Lukas Privalinec; Jozef Repčík; Denis Danac; Martin Kucera	Slovakia	22 June 2015	2015 Games	Baku, Azerbaijan	

Key:
^{WR} World record	^{AR} Area record	^{NR} National record	^{PB} Athlete's personal best

== Women's records ==
Event	Record	Name	Nationality	Date	Games	Place	Ref.
100 m	11.61 (−0.3 m/s)	Olga Lenskiy	Israel	21 June 2015	2015 Games	Baku, Azerbaijan	
200 m	23.40 (+0.5 m/s)	Olga Lenskiy	Israel	22 June 2015	2015 Games	Baku, Azerbaijan	
400 m	53.07	Iveta Putalová	Slovakia	21 June 2015	2015 Games	Baku, Azerbaijan	
800 m	2:01.77 NR	Charline Mathias	Luxembourg	21 June 2015	2015 Games	Baku, Azerbaijan	
1500 m	4:11.58	Luiza Gega	Albania	22 June 2015	2015 Games	Baku, Azerbaijan	
3000 m	9:11.98	Jennifer Wenth	Austria	21 June 2015	2015 Games	Baku, Azerbaijan	
5000 m	16:33.09	Anita Baierl	Austria	22 June 2015	2015 Games	Baku, Azerbaijan	
100 m hurdles	13.18 (±0.0 m/s)	Beate Schrott	Austria	22 June 2015	2015 Games	Baku, Azerbaijan	
400 m hurdles	58.94	Verena Menapace	Austria	21 June 2015	2015 Games	Baku, Azerbaijan	
3000 m steeplechase	10:55.61	Olesea Smovjenco	Moldova	21 June 2015	2015 Games	Baku, Azerbaijan	
High jump	1.86 m	Marija Vuković	Montenegro	22 June 2015	2015 Games	Baku, Azerbaijan	
Pole vault	4.35 m	Kira Grünberg	Austria	21 June 2015	2015 Games	Baku, Azerbaijan	
Long jump	6.68 m (+0.9 m/s)	Jana Velďáková	Slovakia	22 June 2015	2015 Games	Baku, Azerbaijan	
Triple jump	14.41 m (+0.1 m/s)	Hanna Knyazyeva-Minenko	Israel	21 June 2015	2015 Games	Baku, Azerbaijan	
Shot put	14.85 m	Kristina Rakocevic	Montenegro	22 June 2015	2015 Games	Baku, Azerbaijan	
Discus throw	55.08 m	Natalia Stratulat	Romania	21 June 2015	2015 Games	Baku, Azerbaijan	
Hammer throw	69.31 m	Martina Hrašnová	Slovakia	22 June 2015	2015 Games	Baku, Azerbaijan	
Javelin throw	58.00 m	Marharyta Dorozhon	Israel	21 June 2015	2015 Games	Baku, Azerbaijan	
4 × 100 m relay	44.92 NR	Lenka Krsakova; Iveta Putalová; Jana Velďáková; Alexandra Bezekova	Slovakia	21 June 2015	2015 Games	Baku, Azerbaijan	
4 × 400 m relay	3:35.03 NR	Silvia Salvogicova; Alexandra Stukova; Alexandra Bezekova; Iveta Putalová	Slovakia	22 June 2015	2015 Games	Baku, Azerbaijan	

Key:
^{WR} World record	^{AR} Area record	^{NR} National record	^{PB} Athlete's personal best
