= Isaac Uche =

Nigerian sprinter

Personal information
- Born: 10 April 1981 (age 45)

Sport
- Sport: Track and field
Medal record
Representing Nigeria
African Games
Gold medal – first place	2007 Algiers	4x100m relay

Isaac Uche (born 10 April 1981) is a Nigerian sprinter.

He won the gold medal with the Nigerian 4 x 100 metres relay team at the 2007 All-Africa Games. In 60 metres he finished sixth at the 2008 World Indoor Championships.

His personal best time over 60 m is 6.62 seconds, achieved in February 2008 in Chemnitz.
