= List of meet records in athletics =

The list provides links to all lists of meet records for athletics competitions. These are the best performances set during the course of a specific competition. Multi-sport events typically refer to these as games records while single-sport championships refer to them as championship records. For non-championship competitions, the term meet or meeting record is usually used.

== Global championships ==
- Olympics
- IAAF World Championships
- IAAF World Indoor Championships
- IAAF World Junior Championships in Athletics
- IAAF World Relays
- Universiade

== International championships records ==
- ALBA Games
- African Championships in Athletics
- African Junior Athletics Championships
- Asian Athletics Championships
- Asian Indoor Athletics Championships
- Asian Junior Athletics Championships
- Bolivarian Games
- CARIFTA Games
- Central American Championships
- Central American Games
- Central American Junior and Youth Championships
- Central American and Caribbean Championships
- Central American and Caribbean Games
- Commonwealth Games
- European Athletics Championships
- European Athletics Indoor Championships
- European Athletics Junior Championships
- European Games
- European Youth Olympic Festival
- Ibero-American Championships in Athletics
- Micronesian Games
- NACAC Under-23 Championships
- Oceania Area Championships in Athletics
- Pacific Games
- Pan American Games
- Pan American Junior Athletics Championships
- Pan American Race Walking Cup
- South American Championships in Athletics
- South American Games
- South American Junior Championships in Athletics
- South American Youth Championships
- South Asian Games
- Southeast Asian Games

== National championships ==
- Czech Athletics Championships
- German Athletics Championships Indoor records
- German Athletics Championships Outdoor records
- Japan Championships in Athletics
- Lithuanian Athletics Championships
- USA Indoor Track and Field Championships
- USA Outdoor Track and Field Championships

== Notable annual meetings ==
- Adidas Grand Prix
- Adidas Track Classic
- Arcadia Invitational
- Athens Grand Prix Tsiklitiria
- Athletics Bridge
- Athletissima
- Bauhausgalan
- Bislett Games
- British Grand Prix
- CCCAA Championships
- Cezmi Or Memorial
- Colorful Daegu Championships Meeting
- Drake Relays
- European Athletics Festival Bydgoszcz
- Fanny Blankers-Koen Games
- Golden Gala
- Golden Grand Prix
- Golden Spike Ostrava
- Grande Premio Brasil Caixa de Atletismo
- Hanžeković Memorial
- Herculis
- IAAF World Challenge Beijing
- Internationales Stadionfest (ISTAF Berlin)
- Jamaica International Invitational
- Janusz Kusociński Memorial
- Josef Odložil Memorial
- Kansas Relays
- London Grand Prix
- Meeting de Atletismo Madrid
- Meeting Areva
- Meeting Grand Prix IAAF de Dakar
- Meeting International Mohammed VI d'Athlétisme de Rabat
- Melbourne Track Classic
- Memorial Primo Nebiolo
- Memorial Van Damme
- Mt. SAC Relays
- NCAA Men's Division I Outdoor Track and Field Championships
- NCAA Women's Division I Outdoor Track and Field Championships
- Osaka Grand Prix
- Palio Citta della Quercia
- Penn Relays
- Prefontaine Classic
- Ponce Grand Prix
- Qatar Athletic Super Grand Prix
- Rieti Meeting
- Shanghai Golden Grand Prix
- Sydney Track Classic
- Texas Relays
- Weltklasse Zürich
- Xiamen Diamond League

== Indoor meets ==
- Aviva Indoor Grand Prix
- Boston Indoor Games
- Gugl Indoor Meeting
- Indoor Flanders Meeting
- Meeting Pas de Calais
- Millrose Games
- Russian Winter Meeting
- Sparkassen Cup
- Weltklasse in Karlsruhe
- XL Galan
