= List of flag bearers for Comoros at the Olympics =

Comoros at the Olympics
- IOC code: COM
- NOC: Comité Olympique et Sportif des Iles Comores
- Medals: Gold 0 Silver 0 Bronze 0 Total 0

Summer appearances
- 1996; 2000; 2004; 2008; 2012; 2016; 2020; 2024

This is a list of flag bearers who have represented Comoros at the Olympics.

Flag bearers carry the national flag of their country at the opening ceremony of the Olympic Games.

#	Event year	Season	Flag bearer	Sport
1	1996	Summer	Faissoil Ben Daoud	Athletics
2	2000	Summer	Shareef Mohammed	Official
3	2004	Summer	Hadhari Djaffar	Athletics
4	2008	Summer	Feta Ahamada	Athletics
5	2012	Summer	Feta Ahamada	Athletics
6	2016	Summer	Nazlati Mohamed	Swimming
7	2020	Summer	Amed Elna	Athletics
7	2020	Summer	Fadane Hamadi	Athletics
8	2024	Summer	Hachim Maaroufou	Athletics
8	2024	Summer	Maesha Saadi	Swimming

== See also ==
- Comoros at the Olympics
