= Comoros at the 2012 Summer Olympics =

- IOC code: COM
- NOC: Olympic and Sports Committee of the Comoros

in London
- Competitors: 3 in 2 sports
- Flag bearers: Feta Ahamada (opening); Maoulida Darouèche (closing)
- Medals: Gold 0 Silver 0 Bronze 0 Total 0

Summer Olympics appearances (overview)
- 1996; 2000; 2004; 2008; 2012; 2016; 2020; 2024

Comoros competed at the 2012 Summer Olympics in London, England, which was held from 27 July to 12 August 2012. The country's participation at London marked its fifth appearance in the Summer Olympics since its debut at the 1996 Summer Olympics. The delegation included two track and field athletes: Maoulida Darouèche and Feta Ahamada, and one swimmer, Ayouba Ali Sihame, all three qualified for the Games through wildcard places. Ahamada was selected as the flag bearer for the opening ceremony and Darouèche held it at the closing ceremony. Ahamada won her heat in the preliminary round of the women's 100 metres but was eliminated in the heat stages, while Darouèche and Sihame did not advance beyond the first round of their respective events.

== Background ==
This was fifth Summer Olympic Games for Comoros since its debut at the 1996 Summer Olympics in Atlanta, United States. No Comorian athlete has ever won a medal at the Olympics and the nation has not competed at the Winter Olympic Games. Comoros participated in the London Olympics from 27 July to 12 August 2012. The three athletes selected to compete in the London Games were athletes Maoulida Darouèche and Feta Ahamada and swimmer Ayouba Ali Sihame. Ahamada was the flag bearer for the opening ceremony and Darouèche held it for the closing ceremony.

== Athletics ==
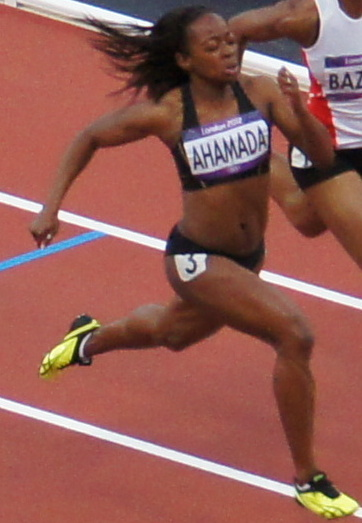
Feta Ahamada competing the women's 100 metres.

Maoulida Darouèche was the only male athlete representing Comoros at the London Olympics. He had not previously competed in any Olympic Games, but was notable for being his country's flag bearer at the opening ceremony. He qualified for the Olympics via a wildcard as his best time, 51.93 seconds, set at the 2011 Chambéry Meeting National, was 3.13 seconds slower than the "B" qualifying standard for his event, the men's 400 metres hurdles. Darouéche competed in the men's 400 metres hurdles on 3 August in the fourth heat of the first round, finishing ninth (and last) out of all competitors with a time of 53.49 seconds in a heat led by Javier Culson of Puerto Rico (48.33 seconds). Overall he finished 46th (and last) out of all entered athletes, (Note: Three athletes were disqualified, and another did not start.) and was 4.31 seconds slower than the slowest competitor that progressed to the semi-final stage and, therefore, that was the end of his competition.

Competing at her second Olympic Games, Feta Ahamada was notable for carrying the flag of Comoros at the closing ceremony. She was the oldest person to compete for Comoros at the Games, aged 25. She qualified for the Olympics via a wildcard as her best time, 12.29 seconds set at the 2011 World Championships in Athletics, was 0.91 seconds slower than the "B" qualifying standard for her event, the women's 100 metres. Ahamada said the London Games would be an opportunity to allow her to improve her performance and record better times. She took part in the preliminary round of the women's 100 metres and was drawn in the first heat. Ahamada finished first with a time of 11.81 seconds to qualify for the heats stage. In the heats, held on the same day as the preliminary round, Ahamada finished seventh out of eight athletes in heat four with a time of 11.86 seconds. She finished 50th out of 78 athletes overall, (Note: One athlete, Noor Hussain Al Malki, did not finish.) and did not progress to the semi-finals because she was 0.58 seconds slower than the slowest qualifier.

Key

- Note–Ranks given for track events are within the athlete's heat only
- Q = Qualified for the next round
- q = Qualified for the next round as a fastest loser or, in field events, by position without achieving the qualifying target
- NR = National record

Men

Athlete	Event	Heat		Semifinal		Final	
Athlete	Event	Result	Rank	Result	Rank	Result	Rank
Maoulida Darouèche	400 m hurdles	53.49	9	Did not advance			

Women

Athlete	Event	Heat		Quarterfinal		Semifinal		Final	
Athlete	Event	Result	Rank	Result	Rank	Result	Rank	Result	Rank
Feta Ahamada	100 m	11.81	1 Q	11.86	7	Did not advance			

== Swimming ==
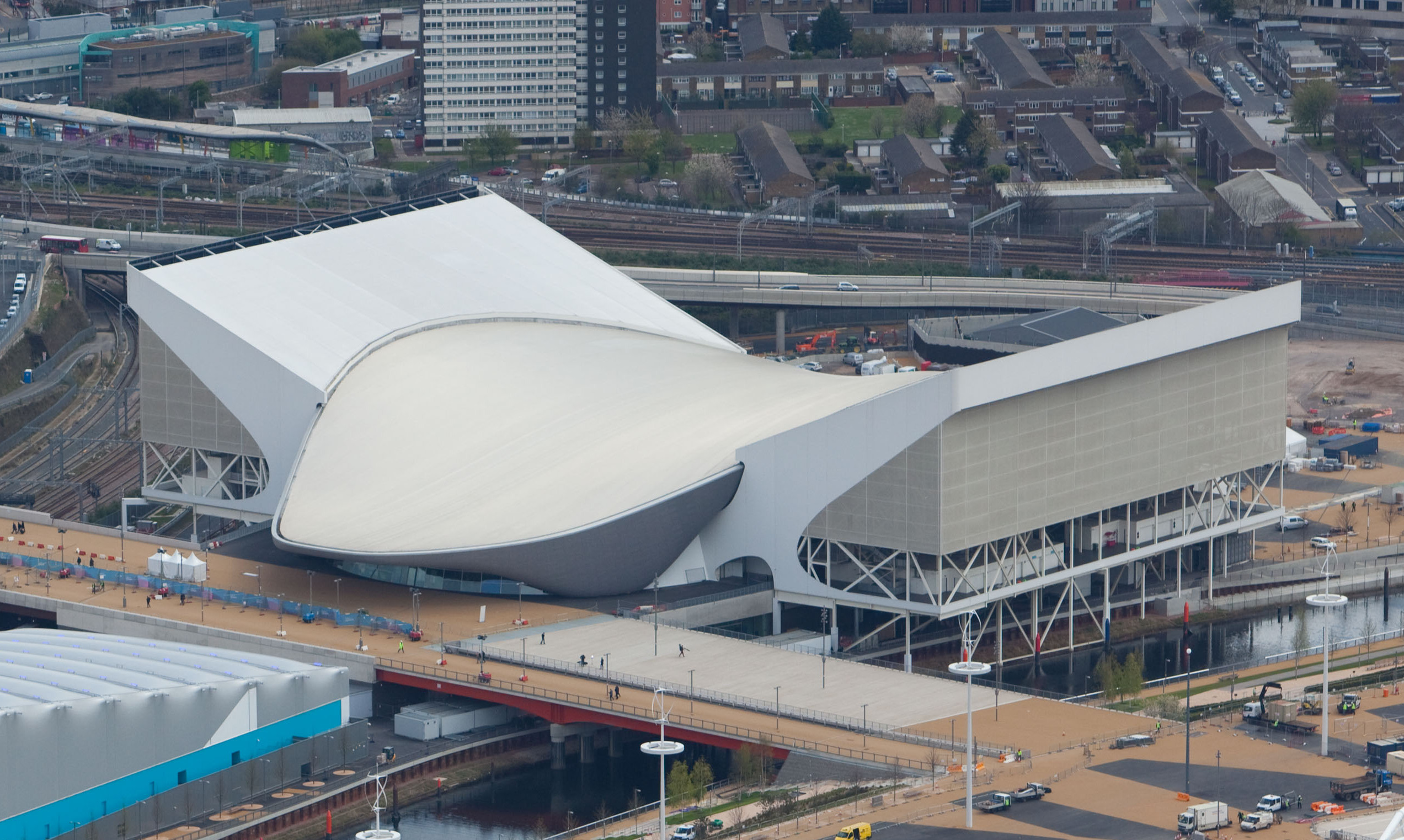
The London Aquatics Centre where Sihame competed in the women's 100 metre freestyle event

Ayouba Ali Sihame was the youngest competitor to be selected by Comoros at the London Games, aged 17. She qualified after receiving a universality place by FINA for the women's 100 metre freestyle as her best time of one minute and 21.54 seconds was not within the standard entry time. Sihame was drawn in the first heat of the competition, which was held on 1 August, finishing third (and last) in her heat with a time of one minute and 14.40 seconds. She finished 48 (and last) of all swimmers who competed, (Note: Two swimmers, Cate Campbell and Therese Alshammar, did not start.) and did not advance to the later stages of the women's 100 metre freestyle.

Women

Athlete	Event	Heat		Semifinal		Final	
Athlete	Event	Time	Rank	Time	Rank	Time	Rank
Ayouba Ali Sihame	100 m freestyle	1:14.40	48	Did not advance			

== See also ==
- Comoros at the 2012 Summer Paralympics
