= List of Comorian records in athletics =

The following are the national records in athletics in Comoros maintained by Comoros' national athletics federation: Fédération Comorienne d'Athlétisme (FCA).

== Outdoor ==
Key to tables: Awaiting ratification Record not kept by FCA

=== Men ===
Event	Record	Athlete	Date	Meet	Place	Ref.
100 m	10.31 (+1.7 m/s)	Hachim Maaroufou	8 June 2024	Meeting de Montpellier	Montpellier, France	
200 m	20.52 (+0.8 m/s)	Hachim Maaroufou	26 May 2022		Aubagne, France	
200 m	20.52 (+1.1 m/s)	Hachim Maaroufou	11 June 2023	Meeting de Montpellier	Montpellier, France	
400 m	47.04	Hadhari Djaffar	7 May 2000		Franconville, France	
150 m	16.00 (+1.0 m/s)	Ambdoul Karim Riffayn	12 May 2023	Meeting National	Toulon, France	
800 m	1:53.10	Attoumani Djamchi	12 August 2011	Indian Ocean Island Games	Victoria, Seychelles	
1500 m	3:46.96	Mohamed Ahmed	5 June 1996		Marseille, France	
3000 m	8:21.82	Mohamed Ahmed	7 May 1995		Aix-les-Bains, France	
5000 m	14:02.2	Mohamed Ahmed	7 June 1995		Marignane, France	
10,000 m	32:15.56	Daou Bacar Mouhamadi	11 March 2017		Saint-Denis, Réunion	
Half marathon	1:11:26	Mickael Motori Charles	11 March 2007		Paris, France	
Marathon	2:35:43	Youssouf Gagou	18 September 1988		Saint-Paul, Réunion	
110 m hurdles	14.04 (+1.8 m/s)	Abdallah Mohamed	1 May 2004		Ypsilanti, United States	
400 m hurdles	51.79	Maoulida Darouèche	6 July 2013		Aubagne, France	
3000 m steeplechase	10:19.1 h	Salim Abdallah	31 August 1979	Indian Ocean Island Games	Saint-Paul, Réunion	
High jump	1.85 m	Mouhoussoine Soudjay	23 May 2015		Gagny, France	
Pole vault	1.40 m	Mohamed M'Sahazi	13 May 2006		Bondy, France	
Long jump	6.92 m	Ali Mahafouohe	6 September 2003	Indian Ocean Island Games	Bambous, Mauritius	
Triple jump	15.34 m	Hilmy Aboud Said	13 June 1999		Martigues, France	
Shot put	12.08 m	Farahane Mohamed	July 1966		Moroni, Comoros	
Discus throw	37.25 m	Kamal Abdoul Wahab	July 1966		Moroni, Comoros	
Hammer throw	12.08 m	Moindze-Boina Hazim	18 May 2025	Championnats de France des clubs Honneur	Cavaillon, France	
Javelin throw	53.97 m	Maoulida Daroueche	23 May 2010	Interclubs 2ème Tour N2 et Honneur	Miramas, France	
Decathlon						
Decathlon	100m / Long jump / Shot put / High jump / 400m / 110m H / Discus / Pole vault / Javelin / 1500m					
20 km walk (road)	2:47:39	Abdoulkarim Said Ahamada	17 April 2016		Mutsamudu, Comoros	
50 km walk (road)						
4 × 100 m relay	41.60	Comoros; M. Athoumane; Y. Mhadjou; J. Bacar; M. Toyb	12 August 2011		Victoria, Seychelles	
4 × 400 m relay	3:19.53	Comoros ? ? ? Bacar Houmadi Jannot	30 June 2010	Atletissima Grand Prix Open international de Wallonie	Namur, Belgium	

=== Women ===
Event	Record	Athlete	Date	Meet	Place	Ref.
100 m	11.59 (+1.2 m/s)	Féta Ahamada	24 July 2009		Angers, France	
200 m	24.08 (−1.4 m/s)	Féta Ahamada	30 June 2012	African Championships	Porto-Novo, Benin	
400 m	55.91	Salhate Djamalidine	28 June 2003		Radès, Tunisia	
800 m	2:10.53	Salhate Djamalidine	14 May 2006		Montgeron, France	
1500 m	5:15.78	Abdoulanziz Ombaida	10 August 2011	Indian Ocean Island Games	Victoria, Seychelles	
3000 m	11:37.22	Tamra Ibouroi	18 April 2015		Saint Denis, Réunion	
5000 m	21:30.12	Frahati Ali	11 August 2011	Indian Ocean Island Games	Victoria, Seychelles	
10,000 m						
Marathon	3:56:54	Zalifa Ali	22 July 2001	National Capital Marathon	Ottawa, Canada	
100 m hurdles	13.83 (−0.3 m/s)	Féta Ahamada	11 July 2009		Bondoufle, France	
400 m hurdles	57.97	Salhate Djamalidine	25 July 2003		Narbonne, France	
3000 m steeplechase						
High jump	1.67 m	Nadia Mladjao	11 July 1998		Dreux, France	
Pole vault						
Long jump	5.60 m (±0.0 m/s)	Fatouma Kari	26 June 2005		Nice, France	
Triple jump	11.32 m (+2.0 m/s)	Fatouma Kari	11 June 2017		Marseille, France	
Shot put	8.65 m	Anliat Boina Issa	1979		Moroni, Comoros	
Discus throw	40.18 m	Farrah Boinali	24 June 2009		Aulnay-sous-Bois, France	
Hammer throw	48.82 m	Farrah Boinali	1 June 2006		Bondy, France	
Javelin throw	30.12 m	?	17 April 2016		Mutsamudu, Comoros	
Heptathlon						
Heptathlon	100m H / High jump / Shot put / 200m / Long jump / Javelin / 800m					
20 km walk (road)						
50 km walk (road)						
4 × 100 m relay	53.73	Comoros; F.S. Abderrahmane; M. Djambae; B. Echata; H.A. Moindhir	31 August 1979	Indian Ocean Island Games	Saint-Paul, Réunion	
4 × 400 m relay	4:18.3	Comoros [[]] [[]] [[]] [[]]	17 April 2016		Mutsamudu, Comoros	

== Indoor ==
=== Men ===
Event	Record	Athlete	Date	Meet	Place	Ref.
60 m	6.69	Hadhari Djaffar	26 February 2000		Paris, France	
200 m	20.95	Hachim Maaroufou	18 February 2024	French Championships	Miramas, France	
400 m	47.94	Jannot Bacar Houmadi	21 February 2015		Aubière, France	
800 m	1:59.11	Chamsidine Djabir	12 February 2005		Paris, France	
1500 m						
3000 m						
60 m hurdles	7.84	Abdallah Mohamed	17 January 2004		Ypsilanti, United States	
High jump	1.50 m	Zayed Saindou	3 January 2015		Paris, France	
Pole vault	2.30 m	Zayed Saindou	4 January 2015		Paris, France	
Long jump	6.51 m	Fayad Younousse	17 January 2010	Championnats d'Aquitaine	Bordeaux, France	
Triple jump	14.92 m	Hilmy Aboud Said	16 January 2000		Miramas, France	
Shot put						
Heptathlon						
Heptathlon	60m / Long jump / Shot put / High jump / 60m H / Pole vault / 1000m					
5000 m walk						
4 × 400 m relay						

=== Women ===
Event	Record	Athlete	Date	Meet	Place	Ref.
60 m	7.39	Feta Ahamada	15 February 2009		Paris, France	
200 m	24.54	Feta Ahamada	23 January 2010	Championnats régionaux Cadet(te)s à Seniors	Eaubonne, France	
400 m	56.15	Salhate Djamaldine	21 January 2005		Eaubonne, France	
800 m	2:10.70	Salhate Djamaldine	11 February 2006		Eaubonne, France	
1500 m						
3000 m						
60 m hurdles	8.39	Feta Ahamada	20 February 2009		Liévin, France	
High jump	1.59 m	Richalda Mohamed	8 November 2015		Eaubonne, France	
Pole vault						
Long jump	5.30 m	Feta Ahamada	28 March 2004		Eaubonne, France	
Triple jump	11.71 m	Feta Ahamada	16 January 2010	Championnats régionaux Cadet(te)s à Seniors	Eaubonne, France	
Shot put						
Pentathlon						
Pentathlon	60m H / High jump / Shot put / Long jump / 800m					
3000 m walk						
4 × 400 m relay						
