= National records in the 100 metres =

The following table is an overview of national records in the 100 metres.

== Men's outdoor ==
Country	Time	Athlete	Date	Place	Ref.	Video
Jamaica	9.58 (+0.9 m/s)	Usain Bolt	16 August 2009	Berlin		
United States	9.69 (+2.0 m/s)	Tyson Gay	20 September 2009	Shanghai		
Kenya	9.77 (+1.2 m/s) A	Ferdinand Omanyala	18 September 2021	Nairobi		
Italy	9.80 (+0.1 m/s)	Marcell Jacobs	1 August 2021	Tokyo		
South Africa	9.82 (+1.0 m/s)	Akani Simbine	4 August 2024	Paris		
Trinidad and Tobago	9.82 (+1.7 m/s)	Richard Thompson	21 June 2014	Port of Spain		
China	9.83 (+0.9 m/s)	Su Bingtian	1 August 2021	Tokyo		
Great Britain	9.83 (+1.3 m/s)	Zharnel Hughes	24 June 2023	New York City		
Cameroon	9.83 (+1.3 m/s)	Emmanuel Eseme	28 July 2026	Glasgow		
Canada	9.84 (+0.7 m/s)	Donovan Bailey	27 July 1996	Atlanta		
Canada	9.84 (+0.2 m/s)	Bruny Surin	22 August 1999	Seville		
Ghana	9.84 (+1.5 m/s)	Abdul-Rasheed Saminu	19 July 2025	Powder Springs		
Nigeria	9.84 (+0.7 m/s)	Kanyinsola Ajayi	29 May 2026	Lexington		
Nigeria	9.84 (+0.1 m/s)	Kanyinsola Ajayi	4 July 2026	Eugene		
Nigeria	9.84 (−0.7 m/s)	Kanyinsola Ajayi	18 July 2026	London		
Colombia	9.85 (+1.5 m/s) A	Ronal Longa	26 June 2026	Medellín		
Australia	9.85 (+1.3 m/s)	Lachlan Kennedy	28 July 2026	Glasgow		
Namibia	9.86 (−0.4 m/s)	Frankie Fredericks	3 July 1996	Lausanne		
Portugal	9.86 (+0.6 m/s)	Francis Obikwelu	22 August 2004	Athens		
Botswana	9.86 (+1.0 m/s)	Letsile Tebogo	4 August 2024	Paris		
France	9.86 (+1.3 m/s)	Jimmy Vicaut	4 July 2015	Paris		
France	9.86 (+1.8 m/s)	Jimmy Vicaut	7 June 2016	Montreuil		
Barbados	9.87 (−0.2 m/s)	Obadele Thompson	11 September 1998	Johannesburg		
Zimbabwe	9.89 (+1.3 m/s)	Ngonidzashe Makusha	10 June 2011	Des Moines		
Cuba	9.90 (±0.0 m/s)	Shainer Reginfo	1 June 2024	Salamanca		
Thailand	9.90 (+0.1 m/s)	Puripol Boonson	25 September 2026	Nagoya		
Bahamas	9.91 (−0.5 m/s)	Derrick Atkins	26 August 2007	Osaka		
Bahamas	9.91 (+1.0 m/s)	Terrence Jones	15 April 2023	Gainesville		
Antigua and Barbuda	9.91 (−0.2 m/s)	Daniel Bailey	17 July 2009	Paris		
Netherlands	9.91 (+0.7 m/s)	Churandy Martina	5 August 2012	London		
Qatar	9.91 (+1.8 m/s)	Femi Ogunode	4 June 2015	Wuhan		
Qatar	9.91 (+0.6 m/s)	Femi Ogunode	22 April 2016	Gainesville		
Liberia	9.91 (+1.2 m/s)	Emmanuel Matadi	19 July 2024	Gainesville		
Turkey	9.92 (+0.9 m/s) A	Jak Ali Harvey	12 June 2016	Erzurum		
Saint Kitts and Nevis	9.93 (+1.9 m/s)	Kim Collins	29 May 2016	Bottrop		
Ivory Coast	9.93 (+1.9 m/s)	Arthur Cissé	24 July 2019	Leverkusen		
Brazil	9.93 (+1.5 m/s)	Erik Cardoso	31 July 2025	São Paulo		
Cayman Islands	9.95 (+1.8 m/s)	Kemar Hyman	7 July 2012	Madrid		
Cayman Islands	9.95 (−1.1 m/s)	Jaiden Reid	10 June 2026	Eugene		
Japan	9.95 (+2.0 m/s)	Ryota Yamagata	6 June 2021	Tottori		
Puerto Rico	9.95 (+0.7 m/s)	Eloy Benitez	24 May 2025	Clermont		
Sri Lanka	9.96 (+1.6 m/s)	Yupun Abeykoon	3 July 2022	La Chaux-de-Fonds		
Oman	9.97 (+1.7 m/s)	Barakat Al-Harthi	9 July 2018	Amman		
Gambia	9.98 (+1.9 m/s)	Ebrahima Camara	14 July 2024	La Chaux-de-Fonds		
Germany	9.98 (+0.8 m/s)	Owen Ansah	6 June 2026	Regensburg		
Norway	9.99 (+1.0 m/s)	Jaysuma Saidy Ndure	30 June 2011	Lausanne		
Poland	10.00 (+2.0 m/s)	Marian Woronin	9 June 1984	Warsaw		
British Virgin Islands	10.00 (+1.1 m/s)	Rikkoi Brathwaite	19 July 2024	Gainesville		
Panama	10.01 (−0.7 m/s)	Alonso Edward	6 June 2018	Cochabamba		
Belgium	10.02 (+1.2 m/s)	Ronald Desruelles	11 May 1985	Naimette-Xhovémont		
Morocco	10.02 (+2.0 m/s)	Yassine Hssine	4 July 2026	Salé		
Zambia	10.03 (+1.5 m/s)	Gerald Phiri	10 May 2014	Clermont		
Bahrain	10.03 (+0.9 m/s)	Kemarley Brown	7 May 2016	Kingston		
Saudi Arabia	10.03 (+1.2 m/s)	Abdullah Abkar Mohammed	30 June 2018	Paris		
Iran	10.03 (+1.2 m/s)	Hassan Taftian	30 June 2018	Paris		
Iran	10.03 (−0.3 m/s)	Hassan Taftian	24 August 2019	Paris		
Indonesia	10.03 (+1.7 m/s)	Lalu Muhammad Zohri	19 May 2019	Osaka		
Senegal	10.03 (+0.5 m/s)	Mamadou Fall Sarr	28 June 2025	Carquefou		
Dominican Republic	10.04 (+1.7 m/s)	José González	27 May 2023	Fort-de-France		
Spain	10.06 (+1.0 m/s)	Bruno Hortelano	23 June 2016	Madrid		
Uganda	10.06 (+0.6 m/s)	Tarsis Orogot	11 May 2024	Gainesville		
Ukraine	10.07 (±0.0 m/s)	Valeriy Borzov	31 August 1972	Munich		
South Korea	10.07 (+0.8 m/s)	Kim Kuk-young	27 June 2017	Jeongseon-eup		
Lesotho	10.07 (+1.4 m/s)	Mojela Koneshe	27 July 2026	Glasgow		
Kazakhstan	10.08 (+1.3 m/s)	Vitaliy Savin	13 August 1992	Linz		
Hungary	10.08 (+1.0 m/s)	Roland Németh	9 June 1999	Budapest		
Azerbaijan	10.08 (+1.3 m/s)	Ramil Guliyev	13 June 2009	Istanbul		
Switzerland	10.08 (+0.1 m/s)	Alex Wilson	30 June 2019	La Chaux-de-Fonds		
New Zealand	10.08 (−0.3 m/s)	Edward Osei-Nketia	15 July 2022	Eugene		
Austria	10.08 (+1.2 m/s)	Markus Fuchs	8 June 2023	Sankt Pölten		
Sweden	10.08 (+0.3 m/s)	Henrik Larsson	12 May 2024	Graz		
Ireland	10.08 (+2.0 m/s)	Israel Olatunde	30 August 2025	London		
Sierra Leone	10.09 (+1.9 m/s)	Pato Bangura Gibrilla	29 July 2009	Loughborough		
Ecuador	10.09 (+2.0 m/s) A	Álex Quiñónez	25 May 2013	Medellín		
Ecuador	10.09 (−0.7 m/s) A	Álex Quiñónez	6 June 2018	Cochabamba		
Malaysia	10.09 (+0.8 m/s)	Muhd Azeem Fahmi	1 August 2022	Cali		
Guyana	10.09 (+2.0 m/s)	Emanuel Archibald	15 June 2024	Leonora		
Israel	10.09 (+1.8 m/s)	Blessing Afrifah	30 July 2025	Jerusalem		
India	10.09 (+0.3 m/s)	Gurindervir Singh	23 May 2026	Ranchi		
Slovenia	10.09 (+1.6 m/s)	Anej Čurin Prapotnik	19 June 2026	Maribor		
Russia	10.10 (+0.4 m/s)	Nikolay Yushmanov	7 June 1986	Leningrad		
Russia	10.10 (+1.3 m/s)	Andrey Yepishin	8 August 2006	Gothenburg		
Mali	10.10 (+1.2 m/s)	Ousmane Diarra	4 May 1996	Athens		
Chile	10.10 (+2.0 m/s)	Sebastián Keitel	26 April 1998	São Leopoldo		
Chile	10.10 (+1.0 m/s)	Sebastián Keitel	17 July 1998	Lisbon		
Cyprus	10.11 (+1.5 m/s)	Yiannis Zisimides	25 May 1996	Rethymno		
Greece	10.11 (+1.4 m/s)	Angelos Pavlakakis	2 August 1997	Athens		
Chinese Taipei	10.11 (+0.2 m/s)	Yang Chun-han	15 June 2018	Hiratsuka		
Argentina	10.11 (+0.5 m/s)	Franco Florio	29 September 2022	Cascavel		
Grenada	10.11 (+0.6 m/s)	Nazzio John	20 May 2023	Hobbs		
Bangladesh	10.11 (+1.1 m/s)	Imranur Rahman	3 September 2023	London		
Mauritius	10.11 (+0.8 m/s)	Gary Noa Jerrel Bibi	7 June 2024	Colmar		
Denmark	10.11 (−0.1 m/s)	Simon Hansen	29 June 2024	Hvidovre		
Anguilla	10.12 (+1.3 m/s)	Zharnel Hughes	28 March 2014	Kingston		
Montserrat	10.12 (+1.8 m/s)	Julius Morris	12 May 2018	Houston		
Finland	10.12 (+0.9 m/s)	Samuli Samuelsson	17 June 2023	Kuortane		
Bulgaria	10.13 (+1.4 m/s)	Petar Petrov	24 July 1980	Moscow		
Gabon	10.13 (+1.3 m/s)	Antoine Boussombo	4 August 2000	Nice		
Gabon	10.13 (+1.9 m/s)	Antoine Boussombo	22 September 2000	Sydney		
Egypt	10.13 (+1.8 m/s)	Amr Ibrahim Mostafa Seoud	12 September 2011	Maputo		
Suriname	10.13 (+1.6 m/s)	Jurgen Themen	28 May 2016	Bradenton		
Slovakia	10.13 (+1.1 m/s)	Ján Volko	29 June 2018	Šamorín		
Slovakia	10.13 (+0.3 m/s)	Ján Volko	16 August 2022	Munich		
Saint Vincent and the Grenadines	10.13 (+1.7 m/s)	Earl Simmonds	25 May 2024	Kingston		
Haiti	10.13 (+1.4 m/s)	Christopher Borzor	14 June 2025	Winter Garden		
Burkina Faso	10.14 (+1.6 m/s)	Idrissa Sanou	13 July 2002	Saint-Étienne		
Lithuania	10.14 (−0.2 m/s)	Rytis Sakalauskas	17 August 2011	Shenzhen		
Uruguay	10.15 (+0.9 m/s)	Heber Viera	25 June 1999	Bogotá		
Saint Lucia	10.16 (+1.9 m/s)	Jahvid Best	2 April 2016	San Diego		
Czech Republic	10.16 (+1.7 m/s)	Zdeněk Stromšík	18 July 2018	Tábor		
Czech Republic	10.16 (+1.6 m/s)	Jan Veleba	26 July 2019	Brno		
Czech Republic	10.16 (+1.0 m/s)	Dominik Záleský	14 August 2021	Zlín		
Madagascar	10.18 (+2.0 m/s) A	Jean-Louis Ravelomanantsoa	13 October 1968	Mexico City		
Latvia	10.18 (+1.4 m/s)	Ronalds Arājs	3 July 2011	Donnas		
Estonia	10.18 (+1.4 m/s)	Karl Erik Nazarov	16 June 2023	Jõhvi		
Chad	10.18 (+0.9 m/s)	Mahamat Goubaye Youssouf	28 April 2024	Doha		
Paraguay	10.19 (±0.0 m/s) A	Cesar Almiron	8 June 2024	Cochabamba		
U.S. Virgin Islands	10.20 (+0.5 m/s)	Greg Barnes	17 June 1988	Tampa		
Honduras	10.20 (+1.6 m/s)	Rolando Palacios	31 January 2010	San Salvador		
Croatia	10.20 (+1.5 m/s)	Dario Horvat	11 May 2013	Azusa		
Fiji	10.20 (+1.2 m/s)	Banuve Tabakaucoro	8 July 2016	Suva		
Romania	10.21 (+0.2 m/s)	Daniel Cojocaru	17 June 1994	Bucharest		
Mexico	10.21 (+0.1 m/s)	Carlos Villaseñor García	11 July 1997	Toluca		
Mexico	10.21 (+0.8 m/s)	José Carlos Herrera	29 August 2014	Xalapa		
Samoa	10.21 (+0.7 m/s)	Jeremy Dodson	21 May 2016	Phoenix		
Iraq	10.21 (−0.7 m/s)	Falah Al-Khazaali	9 July 2026	Ordos		
Swaziland	10.22 (+0.3 m/s)	Sibusiso Matsenjwa	6 July 2018	Réduit		
North Korea	10.22 (+1.8 m/s)	Kum Ryong-jo	1 June 2024	Taipei		
Costa Rica	10.22 (+0.2 m/s)	Alejandro Ricketts	24 April 2026	Bogotá		
Malta	10.23 (+0.9 m/s)	Beppe Grillo	25 May 2024	İzmir		
Venezuela	10.24 (+0.8 m/s)	David Vivas	28 July 2023	São Paulo		
Papua New Guinea	10.24 (+1.2 m/s)	Pais Wisil	15 March 2025	Brisbane		
Papua New Guinea	10.24 (−3.0 m/s)	Tovetuna Tuna (Note: Tovetina Tuna by World Athletics source)	1 May 2025	Lubbock		
Philippines	10.25 (±0.0 m/s)	Eric Cray	9 June 2015	Singapore		
Benin	10.25 (±0.0 m/s)	William Aguessy	1 June 2024	Limoges		
DR Congo	10.25 (+1.7 m/s)	Lionel Tshimanga Muteba	4 June 2024	Guelph		
Belarus	10.27 (+0.9 m/s)	Sergey Kornelyuk	28 May 1994	Biała Podlaska		
Bermuda	10.27 (+0.4 m/s)	DeVon Bean	11 May 1996	Glendora		
Kuwait	10.27 (+1.8 m/s)	Mishal Khalifa Al Mutairi	4 June 2015	Wuhan		
Sudan	10.27 (+1.2 m/s)	Ahmed Ali	9 April 2016	Baton Rouge		
Congo	10.27 (±0.0 m/s)	Dorian Keletela	22 August 2021	Schifflange		
Singapore	10.27 (+2.0 m/s)	Marc Brian Louis	30 September 2023	Hangzhou		
Lebanon	10.27 (−1.1 m/s)	Noureddine Hadid	19 June 2024	Nembro		
Lebanon	10.27 (+1.7 m/s)	Noureddine Hadid	23 June 2024	Guadalajara		
Hong Kong	10.27 (+0.8 m/s)	Yip King Wai	16 November 2025	Guangzhou		
Uzbekistan	10.31 (−0.4 m/s)	Pyotr Vorobyov	17 July 1985	Leningrad		
Turks and Caicos Islands	10.28 (−0.7 m/s)	Delano Williams	15 March 2013	Kingston		
Peru	10.28 (+0.4 m/s)	Andy Martínez	22 April 2016	La Paz		
Algeria	10.29 (+1.6 m/s)	Skander Djamil Athmani	28 July 2017	Algiers		
Mozambique	10.29 (+1.9 m/s)	Steven Sabino	7 June 2025	Potchefstroom		
Moldova	10.30 (+0.4 m/s)	Aleksandr Afteni	19 July 1984	Moscow		
Togo	10.30 (+1.5 m/s)	Franck Amégnigan	8 June 1996	Versailles		
Angola	10.31 (+0.2 m/s)	Marcos Santos	3 August 2024	Paris		
Comoros	10.31 (+1.7 m/s)	Hachim Maaroufou	8 June 2024	Montpellier		
Guatemala	10.32 (±0.0 m/s)	Oscar Meneses	20 June 1998	Caracas		
Central African Republic	10.33 (+1.7 m/s)	Yvon Rodrigue Sialo Ngboda	21 July 2006	Nancy		
Dominica	10.33 (+1.9 m/s)	Chris Lloyd	3 May 2008	Houston		
Maldives	10.33 (+1.9 m/s)	Hassan Saaid	16 April 2016	Kingston		
Seychelles	10.33 (+0.9 m/s)	Dylan Sicobo	23 July 2017	Abidjan		
Seychelles	10.33 (+0.1 m/s)	Dylan Sicobo	24 July 2017	Abidjan		
Malawi	10.33 (+2.0 m/s)	Stern Noel Liffa	8 June 2022	Saint Pierre		
Serbia	10.34 (+0.9 m/s)	Mladen Nikolić	7 September 1984	Athens		
Serbia	10.34 (+1.1 m/s)	Marko Janković	13 June 2003	Kragujevac		
Georgia	10.35 (+1.5 m/s)	Besik Gotsiridze	22 May 1987	Tsaghkadzor		
El Salvador	10.35 (+1.5 m/s)	Ruben Benitez	23 April 1998	Fullerton		
Vietnam	10.35 (+0.7 m/s)	Ngần Ngọc Nghĩa	14 December 2022	Hanoi		
Guinea-Bissau	10.36 (+0.5 m/s)	Holder da Silva	8 July 2009	Salamanca		
Guinea-Bissau	10.36 (+1.7 m/s)	Holder da Silva	12 July 2009	Lisbon		
Guinea-Bissau	10.36 (±0.0 m/s)	Ancuiam Lopes	12 June 2013	Salamanca		
Bolivia	10.36 (±0.0 m/s)	Bruno Rojas	19 May 2012	Sucre		
United Arab Emirates	10.36 (+1.0 m/s)	Hussein Gholoum Rustum	12 December 2012	Dubai		
Aruba	10.37 (+0.9 m/s)	Miguel Janssen	26 June 1999	Apeldoorn		
Armenia	10.37 (+0.6 m/s) A	Alexander Donigian	16 May 2021	Canyon		
Tajikistan	10.37 (+1.5 m/s)	Ildar Akhmadiev	4 June 2022	Tashkent		
Tajikistan	10.37 (−1.1 m/s)	Favoris Muzrapov	25 May 2024	Dushanbe		
Pakistan	10.37 (±0.0 m/s)	Shajar Abbas	13 July 2023	Bangkok		
Tunisia	10.38 (+0.6 m/s)	Toumi Badreddine	25 July 2015	Nuremberg		
Kyrgyzstan	10.38 (+0.6 m/s)	Zhamalidin Musayev	4 July 2016	Almaty		
Marshall Islands	10.39 (+1.9 m/s)	Roman Cress	15 May 1999	Minneapolis		
South Sudan	10.40 A (+0.5 m/s)	Malek Thiep Deng	9 April 2026	Lang'ata		
South Sudan	10.40 A (+0.6 m/s)	Malek Thiep Deng	22 May 2026	Nairobi		
Luxembourg	10.41 (NWI) A	Roland Bombardella	8 September 1979	Mexico City		
Luxembourg	10.41 (+0.2 m/s) A	Roland Bombardella	8 September 1979	Mexico City		
Luxembourg	10.41 (+1.7 m/s)	Daniel Abenzoar-Foulé	21 July 2006	Nancy		
Belize	10.41 (+1.3 m/s)	Jayson Jones	19 April 2008	Clermont		
San Marino	10.41 (+1.2 m/s)	Francesco Sansovini	30 May 2023	Marsa		
Bosnia and Herzegovina	10.42 (+0.2 m/s)	Nedim Čović	1 July 2010	Velenje		
Libya	10.42 (+1.0 m/s)	Ahmed Amaar	14 May 2021	Jacksonville		
Jordan	10.43 (+1.2 m/s)	Zaid Al-Awamleh	18 June 2024	Toronto		
Turkmenistan	10.44 (±0.0 m/s)	Makhmud Yusupov	23 May 1992	Almaty		
Eritrea	10.49 (+0.9 m/s)	Berhane Haile	10 June 1997	Stockholm		
Nicaragua	10.49 (+1.7 m/s)	Yeykell Romero	9 October 2021	Managua		
Macedonia	10.50 (+1.6 m/s)	Andreas Trajkovski	11 June 2022	Hvidovre		
Iceland	10.51 (+1.5 m/s)	Ari Bragi Kárason	2 July 2017	Hafnarfjörður		
Iceland	10.51 (−0.7 m/s)	Kolbeinn Höður Gunnarsson	3 June 2023	Bergen		
Iceland	10.51 (−0.5 m/s)	Kolbeinn Höður Gunnarsson	20 June 2023	Chorzów		
Ethiopia	10.52 (NWI) A	Amanuel Abebe	27 June 2013	Addis Ababa		
Palau	10.52 (+1.2 m/s)	Rodman Teltull	8 July 2016	Suva		
French Polynesia	10.52 (NWI)	Jean Bourne	21 July 1972	Colombes		
Niger	10.52 (NWI)	Yacouba Bello	29 May 2005	Niamey		
Liechtenstein	10.53 (NWI)	Martin Frick	12 July 1996	Bellinzona		
Monaco	10.53 (+1.4 m/s)	Sébastien Gattuso	12 July 2008	Dijon		
Macau	10.53 (+2.0 m/s)	Kin Wa Chan	13 April 2024	Hong Kong		
Palestine	10.55 (−0.3 m/s)	Mohammed Abukhousa	6 July 2014	Strasbourg		
Montenegro	10.55 (+0.3 m/s)	Luka Rakić	13 June 2015	Celje		
Tonga	10.56 (+1.7 m/s)	Toluta'u Koula	29 November 1996	Townsville		
Guinea	10.56 (±0.0 m/s)	Joseph Loua	1 May 1997	L'Aigle		
Albania	10.56 (+1.1 m/s)	Arben Maka	15 July 2003	Donnas		
Tanzania	10.57 (NWI) A	Norman Chihota	13 October 1968	Mexico City		
Brunei	10.59 (±0.0 m/s)	Fakhri Ismail	9 June 2015	Singapore		
São Tomé and Príncipe	10.61 (±0.0 m/s)	Yazaldes Nascimento	1 June 2007	Leiria		
Mongolia	10.62 (+1.2 m/s)	Battulgyn Achitbileg	25 June 2016	Almaty		
Afghanistan	10.64 (+0.6 m/s)	Sha Mahmood Noor Zahi	3 August 2024	Paris		
Myanmar	10.64 (NWI)	Soe Win	8 December 1969	Yangon		
Vanuatu	10.64 (+0.5 m/s)	Moses Kamut	26 July 2005	Koror		
Vanuatu	10.64 (−0.6 m/s)	Moses Kamut	18 February 2006	Melbourne		
Vanuatu	10.64 (+2.0 m/s)	Moses Kamut	15 March 2008	Auckland		
Equatorial Guinea	10.65 (−0.5 m/s)	Gus Envela Jr.	31 July 1992	Barcelona		
Guam	10.66 (+1.8 m/s)	Philam Garcia	17 June 2004	La Jolla		
Syria	10.67 (+0.5 m/s)	Nabil Nahri	24 July 1980	Moscow		
Cambodia	10.67 (NWI)	Pen Sokong	27 November 2020	Phnom Penh		
Cape Verde	10.69 (−0.5 m/s)	Ronaldinho Oliveira	3 June 2023	Salamanca		
Cape Verde	10.69 (+1.6 m/s)	Ronaldinho Oliveira	3 June 2023	Salamanca		
Nepal	10.71 (NWI)	Ram Krishna Chaudhari	26 September 1999	Kathmandu		
Mauritania	10.74 (+0.7 m/s)	Cheikh Diagana	11 July 2006	Antony		
Laos	10.74 (−0.2 m/s)	Sorsy Phompakdy	29 September 2023	Hangzhou		
Solomon Islands	10.75 (+1.0 m/s)	Joseph Onika	11 July 1990	Suva		
Kosovo	10.78 (+0.7 m/s)	Edis Ahmeti	8 June 2017	Elbasan		
Andorra	10.79 (+1.7 m/s)	Dylan Ben-Ahmed	6 June 2026	Santa Coloma de Gramenet		
American Samoa	10.81 (−1.7 m/s)	Kelsey Nakanelua	28 April 2001	Honolulu		
Nauru	10.82 (+0.5 m/s)	Jonah Harris	16 July 2019	Apia		
Federated States of Micronesia	10.83 (±0.0 m/s)	John Howard	25 July 2009	Tumon		
Burundi	10.84 (NWI)	Kassiem Ntahimpera	13 July 1989	Casablanca		
Kiribati	10.86 (+1.8 m/s)	Kenaz Kaniwete	27 July 2026	Glasgow		
Gibraltar	10.89 (−0.5 m/s)	Jessy Franco	12 June 2019	Gibraltar		
Yemen	10.90 (NWI)	Nagib Salem Ahmed	1 July 1982	Kyiv		
Cook Islands	10.97 (±0.0 m/s)	Mark Sherwin	4 December 1993	Brisbane		
Northern Mariana Islands	10.99 (−0.2 m/s)	Tyrone Omar	4 September 2007	Apia		
Somalia	11.26 (+1.1 m/s)	Sakaria Hussein	15 June 2014	Halmstad		
Tuvalu	11.30 (+0.6 m/s)	Karalo Maibuca	3 August 2024	Paris		
Rwanda	11.35 (−0.4 m/s)	Islam Mulinda	18 July 2007	Algiers		
Timor-Leste	11.35 (−0.4 m/s)	Manuel Ataide	3 August 2024	Paris		
Norfolk Island	11.38 (NWI)	Jonathan McKee	20 August 1986	Gothenburg		
Djibouti	11.39 (NWI)	Ismael Abdallah	24 May 2001	Forest		
Bhutan	11.64 (±0.0 m/s)	Dinesh Kumar Dhakal	27 September 2019	Doha		

== Women's outdoor ==
Country	Time	Athlete	Date	Place	Ref.
United States	10.49 (±0.0 m/s) (Note: It is widely believed that the anemometer was faulty for the race in which Florence Griffith Joyner set the official world record for the women's 100 m of 10.49 s. A 1995 report commissioned by the IAAF estimated the true wind speed was between +5.0 m/s and +7.0 m/s, rather than the ±0.0 m/s recorded. If this time, recorded in the quarter-final of the 1988 U.S. Olympic trials, were excluded, the American record would have been 10.61 s, also by Griffith Joyner, recorded the next day at the same venue in the final.)	Florence Griffith Joyner	16 July 1988	Indianapolis	
Jamaica	10.54 (+0.9 m/s)	Elaine Thompson-Herah	21 August 2021	Eugene	
British Virgin Islands	10.63 (+1.9 m/s)	Adaejah Hodge	11 June 2026	Eugene	
Saint Lucia	10.72 (−0.1 m/s)	Julien Alfred	3 August 2024; 10 June 2023; 15 April 2023	Paris	
Ivory Coast	10.72 (+0.4 m/s)	Marie-Josée Ta Lou	10 August 2022	Monaco	
France	10.73 (+2.0 m/s)	Christine Arron	19 August 1998	Budapest	
Russia	10.77 (+0.9 m/s)	Irina Privalova	6 July 1994	Lausanne	
Bulgaria	10.77 (+0.7 m/s)	Ivet Lalova-Collio	19 June 2004	Plovdiv	
China	10.79 (±0.0 m/s)	Li Xuemei	18 October 1997	Shanghai	
Nigeria	10.79 (+1.1 m/s); 10.72 (+2.7 m/s) w	Blessing Okagbare	27 July 2013; 31 March 2018	London; Austin	
Germany	10.81 (+1.7 m/s); 10.79 (+3.3 m/s) w	Marlies Göhr	8 June 1983; 16 July 1980	Berlin; Cottbus	
Netherlands	10.81 (−0.3 m/s)	Dafne Schippers	24 August 2015	Beijing	
Ukraine	10.82 (−0.3 m/s); 10.6 h (+0.1 m/s)	Zhanna Pintusevich-Block	6 August 2001; 12 June 1997	Edmonton; Kyiv	
Trinidad and Tobago	10.82 (+0.9 m/s)	Michelle-Lee Ahye	24 June 2017	Port-of-Spain	
Greece	10.83 (+0.1 m/s); 10.77 (+2.3 m/s) w	Katerina Thanou	22 August 1999; 28 May 1999	Seville; Rethymno	
Great Britain	10.83 (+0.1 m/s); 10.83 (+0.8 m/s); 10.80 (+3.8 m/s) w	Dina Asher-Smith; Dina Asher-Smith; Daryll Neita	29 September 2019; 17 July 2022; 25 June 2022	Doha; Eugene; Manchester	
Bahamas	10.84 (+1.9 m/s)	Chandra Sturrup	5 July 2005	Lausanne	
Canada	10.86 (+1.7 m/s)	Sade McCreath	12 July 2026	Edmonton	
Switzerland	10.89 (+0.6 m/s)	Mujinga Kambundji	24 June 2022	Zürich	
Brazil	10.91 (−0.2 m/s)	Rosângela Santos	6 August 2017	London	
Belarus	10.92 (+0.1 m/s)	Yulia Nestsiarenka	21 August 2004	Athens	
Poland	10.93 (+1.8 m/s); 10.94 (+0.2 m/s)	Ewa Kasprzyk; Ewa Swoboda	27 June 1986; 16 July 2023	Grudziądz; Chorzów	
Gambia	10.93 (+0.5 m/s)	Gina Mariam Bass Bittaye	18 May 2024	Fort-de-France	
New Zealand	10.93 (+1.0 m/s); 10.89 (+3.4 m/s) w	Zoe Hobbs	28 July 2026; 3 March 2023	Glasgow; Wellington	
Namibia	10.97 (+1.6 m/s); 10.90 (+2.8 m/s) w	Christine Mboma	30 April 2022; 15 April 2022	Gaborone; Little Rock	
Cameroon	10.98 (+0.6 m/s)	Myriam Léonie Mani	11 June 2001	Athens	
South Africa	10.98 (+1.5 m/s); 10.94 (+3.0 m/s) w A	Carina Horn; Evette De Klerk	4 May 2018; 20 April 1990	Doha; Germiston	
Ecuador	10.99 (+0.9 m/s)	Ángela Gabriela Tenorio	22 July 2015	Toronto	
Liberia	10.99 (+0.6 m/s)	Destiny Smith-Barnett	7 June 2024	Sherman Oaks	
Australia	10.99 (+1.0 m/s)	Torrie Lewis	28 July 2026	Glasgow	
Luxembourg	11.00 (+2.0 m/s)	Patrizia Van Der Weken	9 June 2024	Rome	
Czech Republic	11.01 (+0.9 m/s)	Karolína Maňasová	4 June 2026	St. Pölten	
Italy	11.01 (+2.0 m/s)	Zaynab Dosso	9 June 2024	Rome	
Egypt	11.02 (−0.4 m/s) A 10.97 (+4.9 m/s) w	Bassant Hemida	7 May 2022; 27 March 2022	Kasarani; Maadi	
Gabon	11.03 (+1.1 m/s); 11.03 (+1.6 m/s)	Ruddy Zang Milama	19 May 2012; 16 June 2012	Port-of-Spain; Angers	
Uzbekistan	11.04 (+2.0 m/s)	Lyubov Perepelova	3 June 2000	Bishkek	
Sri Lanka	11.04 (−0.3 m/s)	Susanthika Jayasinghe	9 September 2000	Yokohama	
Belgium	11.04 (+2.0 m/s); 11.03 (+5.2 m/s) w	Kim Gevaert; Delphine Nkansa	9 July 2006; 30 July 2023	Brussels; Bruges	
Dominican Republic	11.04 (−0.8 m/s)	Liranyi Alonso	1 August 2025	Bayaguana	
Bahrain	11.05 (+0.9 m/s)	Edidiong Odiong	14 May 2022	Durham	
Spain	11.06 (+1.7 m/s); 11.00 (+4.0 m/s) w	Sandra Myers; Glory Alozie	23 July 1991; 8 July 2001	Vigo; Valencia	
Israel	11.06 (+1.2 m/s)	Diana Vaisman	3 July 2022	La Chaux-de-Fonds	
Antigua and Barbuda	11.06 (+0.5 m/s)	Joella Lloyd	25 May 2024	Lexington	
Hungary	11.06 (±0.0 m/s)	Boglárka Takács	27 June 2025	Madrid	
U.S. Virgin Islands	11.07 (+1.3 m/s); 10.91 (+4.5 m/s) w 11.03 (+2.7 m/s) w	Laverne Jones-Ferrette	3 August 2012; 8 July 2012; 4 April 2009	London; Tomblaine; Austin	
Niger	11.07 (+1.9 m/s); 11.05 (+3.2 m/s) w	Aminatou Seyni	8 June 2022; 8 June 2022	Saint Pierre; Saint Pierre	
Guyana	11.07 (+0.4 m/s)	Jasmine Abrams	25 June 2022	Port-of-Spain	
Georgia	11.08 (±0.0 m/s); 10.9 h (+0.8 m/s)	Maya Azarashvili	14 August 1988; 13 September 1988	Kyiv; Vladivostok	
Cayman Islands	11.08 (+1.0 m/s); 11.02 (+3.5 m/s) w	Cydonie Mothersille	5 July 2006; 8 July 2006	Salamanca; La Laguna	
Cuba	11.08 (+1.8 m/s); 10.8 h (±0.0 m/s) (Note: Benavide's repeated this time on 19 July 2008 at the same location. Because of unknown irregularities, neither has been ratified as national record.); 11.00 (+3.5 m/s) w	Yunisleidy García Abreu; Virgen Benavides; Roxana Díaz	27 May 2023; 20 June 2008; 25 February 2010	Fort-de-France; Havana; Havana	
Mexico	11.09 (+1.9 m/s) A	Liliana Allen	19 June 1999	Mexico City	
Saint Vincent and the Grenadines	11.09 (+0.6 m/s); 11.09 (+0.8 m/s); 11.01 (+3.4 m/s) w	Natasha Joe-Mayers	21 April 2002; 19 April 2003; 14 April 2001	Walnut; Walnut; Azusa	
Slovenia	11.09 (+2.0 m/s)	Merlene Ottey	3 August 2004	Liège	
Kazakhstan	11.09 (+0.8 m/s)	Olga Safronova	24 May 2016	Almaty	
Puerto Rico	11.09 (+0.7 m/s); 11.05 (+3.1 m/s) w A	Gladymar Torres; Carol Rodríguez	22 August 2026; 27 May 2006	Santo Domingo; Provo	
Norway	11.10 (+1.2 m/s)	Ezinne Okparaebo	4 August 2012	London	
Portugal	11.10 (+1.8 m/s)	Lorène Dorcas Bazolo	14 August 2021	La Chaux-de-Fonds	
Portugal	11.10 (+1.9 m/s)	Lorène Bazolo	14 June 2025	Braga	
Zambia	11.12 (−0.5 m/s) A	Rhoda Njobvu	20 March 2021	Lusaka	
Finland	11.13 (+1.0 m/s)	Helinä Marjamaa	19 July 1983	Lahti	
Ireland	11.13 (+0.7 m/s); 10.84 (+3.5 m/s) w	Rhasidat Adeleke	30 June 2024; 27 April 2024	Dublin; Austin	
Ghana	11.14 (±0.0 m/s); 11.09 (+4.8 m/s) w	Vida Anim; Janet Amponsah	20 August 2004; 3 May 2014	Athens; Lubbock	
Barbados	11.14 (+2.0 m/s); 11.03 (+3.0 m/s) w	Tristan Evelyn	16 May 2021; 14 March 2024	Tampa; Houston	
Austria	11.15 (±0.0 m/s)	Karin Mayr-Krifka	9 August 2003	Salzburg	
Sweden	11.16 (+1.0 m/s); 10.95 (+4.1 m/s) w 11.08 (+3.1 m/s) w	Linda Haglund; Julia Henriksson; Julia Henriksson	26 July 1980; 18 May 2024; 28 June 2024	Moscow; Malmö; Uddevalla	
India	11.17 (±0.0 m/s)	Dutee Chand	21 June 2021	Patiala	
Colombia	11.17 (+0.7 m/s)	María Maturana	29 May 2026	Lima	
Grenada	11.18 (+0.9 m/s)	Sherry Fletcher	23 July 2007	Rio de Janeiro	
Haiti	11.18 (+1.4 m/s)	Barbara Pierre	21 May 2009	San Angelo	
Lithuania	11.19 (+1.5 m/s)	Lina Grinčikaitė-Samuolė	3 August 2012	London	
Chile	11.19 (−1.2 m/s) A	Isidora Jiménez	6 June 2018	Cochabamba	
Kenya	11.19 (+0.3 m/s) A	Maximila Imali	25 June 2022	Kasarani	
Slovakia	11.19 (+0.6 m/s); 11.13 (+2.2 m/s) w 11.0 h (+1.4 m/s) (Note: Ratified but later rescinded by World Athletics for an unknown irregularity)	Viktória Forster; Viktória Forster; Eva Glesková	17 June 2025; 29 June 2024; 1 July 1972	Banská Bystrica; Banská Bystrica; Budapest	
Singapore	11.20 (±0.0 m/s); 11.19 (+2.3 m/s) w	Veronica Shanti Pereira	14 July 2023; 17 June 2023	Bangkok; Dessau	
Japan	11.21 (+1.7 m/s); 11.16 (+3.4 m/s) w	Chisato Fukushima	29 April 2010; 26 June 2011	Hiroshima; Tottori	
Saint Kitts and Nevis	11.21 (+2.0 m/s); 11.07 (+5.4 m/s) w 11.18 (+2.0 m/s) (Note: Tameka's record times of 2012 (she also ran 11.19 on June 11 with -0.3 wind speed) were rescinded after she admitted to doping in August 2012.)	Virgil Hodge; Virgil Hodge; Tameka Williams	28 April 2012; 17 May 2008; 28 April 2012	Fort Worth; Austin; San Marcos	
Chinese Taipei (Taiwan)	11.22 (+1.9 m/s)	Cheng Chi	18 July 1970	Vienna	
Congo	11.22 (+0.5 m/s); 11.10 (+3.7 m/s) w	Natacha Ngoye	31 July 2023; 27 May 2023	Kinshasa; Dakar	
Venezuela	11.0 h (+0.3 m/s) A 11.24 (+1.2 m/s); 11.18 (+3.4 m/s) w	Nediam Vargas; Andrea Purica; Andrea Purica	26 March 2016; 29 July 2018; 23 June 2017	Cuenca; Barranquilla; Asunción	
Senegal	11.24 (+1.5 m/s); 10.9 h (+2.0 m/s) # 11.23 (+3.0 m/s) w A	Aminata Diouf; Aminata Diouf; Aida Diop	15 August 1999; 21 May 1998; 18 March 2000	La Chaux-de-Fonds; Dakar; Pietersburg	
Turkey	11.25 (+1.6 m/s); 10.98 (+2.9 m/s) w	Nora Güner	11 September 2001; 11 September 2001	Tunis; Tunis	
Cyprus	11.25 (+1.1 m/s); 11.25 (+1.6 m/s); 11.18 (+4.6 m/s) w	Anna Ramona Papaioannou; Olivia Fotopoulou; Olivia Fotopoulou	18 June 2016; 8 July 2023; 2 June 2022	Nicosia; Nicosia; Vari	
Botswana	11.25 (+1.6 m/s); 11.24 (+0.4 m/s) # (Note: While listed as a national record in their 2022 publication, the World Athletics database does not include Matlhaku's results of 20 February 2022, lists 11.55 as her personal best, and denotes Sebele's time of 11.25 as Botswana's national record)	Tsaone Bakani Sebele; Loungo Matlhaku	30 April 2022; 10 February 2021	Gaborone; Gaborone	
Philippines	11.27 (+1.5 m/s)	Kristina Marie Knott	29 August 2020	Des Moines	
Dominica	11.29 (+1.5 m/s); 11.13 (+>2.0 m/s) w	Hermin Joseph	23 August 1994; 8 May 1993	Victoria; Abilene	
Papua New Guinea	11.29 (+1.9 m/s); 11.29 (+2.0 m/s); 11.26 (+2.6 m/s) w	Toea Wisil	9 July 2016; 17 February 2017; 11 February 2017	Suva; Canberra; Brisbane	
Latvia	11.29 (+1.1 m/s)	Sindija Bukša	29 May 2018	Riga	
Romania	11.30 (+0.5 m/s); 11.27 (+3.0 m/s) w 11.29 (+2.2 m/s) w	Ionela Târlea; Andreea Ogrăzeanu; Andreea Ogrăzeanu	19 June 1999; 19 July 2014; 29 June 2011	Paris; Pitești; Bucharest	
Croatia	11.30 (+1.1 m/s); 11.1 h (NWI)	Andrea Ivančević; Jelica Pavličić	25 July 2015; 1 June 1975	Varaždin; Zagreb	
São Tomé and Príncipe	11.31 (+1.2 m/s); 11.30 (+3.9 m/s) w	Gorete Semedo	10 June 2022; 18 May 2024	Lisbon; Lisbon	
Madagascar	11.32 (+1.9 m/s); 11.32 (+1.2 m/s); 10.9 h (+4.8 m/s) w 11.25 (+2.5 m/s) w	Laloa Ravaonirina; Hanitriniaina Rakotondrabe; Hanitriniaina Rakotondrabe; Claudine Njarasoa	6 July 1991; 26 May 1996; 22 June 1996; 5 June 2024	Limoges; Dijon; Bondoufle; Bonneuil-sur-Marne	
Denmark	11.32 (+0.2 m/s); 11.30 (+2.1 m/s) w	Ida Karstoft	11 June 2022; 21 May 2022	Hvidovre; Copenhagen	
Thailand	11.33 (±0.0 m/s)	Supavadee Khawpeag	16 September 2001	Kuala Lumpur	
Uganda	11.33 (+1.2 m/s) A 11.2 h (NWI) A 11.2 h (NWI) A	Jacent Nyamahunge; Mildred Gamba; Justine Bayiga	24 June 2022; 24 July 2009; 13 March 2010	Kampala; Kampala; Kampala	
Iran	11.33 (+1.0 m/s); 11.32 (+3.2 m/s) w A	Hamideh Esmaeilnejad	12 July 2023; 16 June 2024	Bangkok; Tehran	
Serbia	11.34 (+0.8 m/s); 11.35 (+1.5 m/s)	Kornelija Šinković Pavićević; Milana Tirnanić	17 June 1987; 1 July 2023	Belgrade; Budapest	
Vietnam	11.34 (?); 11.33 (+3.1 m/s) w	Vu Thi Huong	13 December 2009; 26 July 2007	Vientiane; Amman	
Estonia	11.35 (+1.3 m/s)	Ksenija Balta	15 June 2014	Tartu	
Estonia	11.35 (+0.3 m/s)	Ann Marii Kivikas	2 August 2025	Tallinn	
Estonia	11.35 (±0.0 m/s)	Ann Marii Kivikas	10 August 2026	Birmingham	
Swaziland	11.35 (+0.2 m/s)	Phumlile Ndzinisa	29 May 2016	Forbach	
Malawi	11.35 (±0.0 m/s)	Asimenye Simwaka	22 June 2024	Douala	
Zimbabwe	11.36 (+1.2 m/s)	Winneth Dube	11 April 2003	Durban	
Kyrgyzstan	11.37 (+0.7 m/s); 11.35 (?) (Note: Not ratified or later rescinded by Athletics Federation of Kyrgyz Republic for an unknown irregularity)	Yelena Bobrovskaya	20 May 2004; 22 July 2004	Tashkent; Bishkek	
Mali	11.39 (+1.0 m/s)	Kadiatou Camara	30 March 2008	Dakar	
Argentina	11.40 (+1.7 m/s) A 11.2 h (+3.9 m/s) w	María Victoria Woodward; Olga Conte	13 May 2018; 23 September 1996	Cochabamba; Buenos Aires	
Sierra Leone	11.40 (+1.0 m/s); 11.33 (+3.7 m/s) w 11.34 (+3.2 m/s) w	Maggie Barrie; Ngozi Musa; Fatmata Awolo	6 July 2019; 6 May 2017; 23 April 2022	Montverde; New Haven; Waco	
Iraq	11.41 (+1.1 m/s); 11.24 (±0.0 m/s) X (Note: Danah Hussein tested positive after this race for two banned substances.)	Dana Hussain	2 May 2021; 17 June 2021	Erbil; Radès	
Suriname	11.42 (±0.0 m/s) A	Sunayna Wahi	9 May 2017	Gunnison	
Morocco	11.45 (+0.1 m/s)	Assia Raziki	22 June 2016	Durban	
Costa Rica	11.46 (+1.6 m/s)	Sharolyn Zulay Joseph Hamblet	21 July 2015	Toronto	
Belize	11.46 (+1.3 m/s)	Kaina Martinez	25 May 2017	Bradenton	
Burkina Faso	11.47 (+1.7 m/s)	Kadidiatou Traoré	29 July 2015	Castres	
Oman	11.47 (+1.8 m/s)	Mazoon Al-Alawi	16 May 2022	Kuwait	
South Korea	11.49 (+0.8 m/s); 11.46 (+4.2 m/s) w	Lee Young-sook; Jin You	17 June 1994; 22 October 2017	Seoul; Cheongju	
Benin	11.50 (+1.4 m/s) (Note: Indicated as Feraez's legal personal best at World Athletics, but her slower time of 2006 is listed as the national record by the Fédération Béninoise d'Athlétisme.); 11.55 (+2.0 m/s)	Fabienne Feraez	5 August 1998; 12 May 2006	Montauban; Doha	
Panama	11.50 (+1.5 m/s); 11.45 (+4.2 m/s) w	Selena Mariel Arjona; Yasmin Louise Woodruff	26 May 2022; 26 June 2015	Allendale; Managua	
Algeria	11.51 (±0.0 m/s) (Note: Considered a legal run and personal best by World Athletics, but not recognized as a national record by the Fédération Algérienne d'Athlétisme); 11.61 (−1.5 m/s); 11.61 (+2.0 m/s); 11.1 h (±0.0 m/s) # 11.58 (+>2.0 m/s) w	Baya Rahouli; Souheir Bouali; Souheir Bouali; Baya Rahouli; Souheir Bouali	17 June 1999; 8 July 2007; 18 June 2008; 31 July 1999; 24 April 2015	Algiers; Algiers; Tlemcen; Constantine; Manama	
Kuwait	11.52 (+1.8 m/s); 11.45 (+3.2 m/s) w A	Mudhawi Alshammari	30 July 2022; 30 July 2022	Kuwait; Konya	
Uruguay	11.54 (+1.7 m/s) A	Claudia Acerenza	22 July 1988	Mexico City	
Chad	11.54 (+1.9 m/s) A	Kaltouma Nadjina	24 May 2009	Calgary	
Malta	11.54 (+1.1 m/s)	Charlotte Wingfield	13 May 2017	Marsa	
San Marino	11.50 (+0.1 m/s)	Alessandra Gasparelli	24 June 2025	Maribor	
San Marino	11.42 (+2.2 m/s) w	Alessandra Gasparelli	19 May 2024	Ismailia	
Lebanon	11.54 (+1.4 m/s)	Aziza Sbaity	27 May 2023	Weinheim	
Macau	11.54 (+0.4 m/s)	Loi Im Lan	17 November 2025	Guangzhou	
Fiji	11.55 (+0.1 m/s)	Makelesi Batimala	4 September 2007	Apia	
Malaysia	11.56 (+0.1 m/s); 11.56 (+0.6 m/s); 11.36 (+2.5 m/s) w A 11.45 (+0.4 m/s) A (Note: Not ratified or later rescinded by both World Athletics and the Malaysia Athletics Federation for an unknown irregularity); 11.50 (NWI) (Note: Not accepted by World Athletics due to the absence of a wind reading, but ratified by the national athletics association as a national record)	Govindasamy Shanti; Zaidatul Husniah Zulkifli; Zaidatul Husniah Zulkifli; Zaidatul Husniah Zulkifli; Govindasamy Shanti	19 October 1997; 12 July 2023; 4 March 2017; 8 March 2017; 7 May 1993	Jakarta; Bangkok; Pretoria; Bloemfontein; Kuala Lumpur	
Indonesia	11.56 (−0.5 m/s)	Irene Truitje Joseph	8 August 1999	Bandar Seri Begawan	
Turkmenistan	11.56 (+1.7 m/s); 11.3 h (?) (Note: Not ratified or later rescinded by World Athletics for an unknown irregularity)	Valentina Meredova; Yelena Ryabova	7 June 2008; 4 May 2012	Almaty; Ashgabat	
Iceland	11.56 (+0.6 m/s); 11.47 (+2.7 m/s) w	Guðbjörg Jóna Bjarnadóttir	29 June 2019; 11 August 2018	Mannheim; Copenhagen	
Bolivia	11.57 (+1.3 m/s) A	Guadalupe Torrez	21 April 2024	Cochabamba	
Moldova	11.58 (+2.0 m/s); 11.60 (+1.5 m/s)	Irina Grigoryeva; Alina Cravcenco	28 June 1985; 7 July 2013	Tallinn; La Chaux-de-Fonds	
Comoros	11.59 (+1.2 m/s); 11.50 (+3.8 m/s) w	Feta Ahamada	24 July 2009; 10 July 2009	Angers; Bondoufle	
Peru	11.60 (+1.7 m/s)	Paula Daruich	29 May 2026	Lima	
Mozambique	11.61 (+0.7 m/s)	Elisa Cossa	21 August 2000	Girona	
Azerbaijan	11.61 (±0.0 m/s)	Zakiyya Hasanova	9 June 2018	Schaan	
Paraguay	11.61 (+1.9 m/s)	Xenia Hiebert	11 November 2023	Asunción	
Hong Kong	11.62 (+0.4 m/s)	Lam On Ki	21 April 2019	Doha	
Tajikistan	11.62 (+1.5 m/s); 11.41 (+2.1 m/s) w	Gulsumbi Sharifova	8 April 2021; 14 May 2021	Dushanbe; Tashkent	
Mauritius	11.64 (+1.6 m/s)	Oceanne Moirt	7 June 2024	Colmar	
Myanmar	11.66 (±0.0 m/s); 11.54 (+2.5 m/s) w	Than Than Htay	14 October 1997; 19 October 1997	Jakarta; Jakarta	
Guatemala	11.66 (−0.2 m/s); 11.48 (+5.5 m/s) w A	Mariandree Chacón	17 June 2022; 21 July 2023	Managua; San José	
Tunisia	11.68 (+1.0 m/s); 11.65 (?)	Awatef Hamrouni	8 June 2000; 11 September 2001	Algiers; Tunis	
Angola	11.69 (NWI)	Antónia de Jesus	30 June 1995	Porto	
Albania	11.71 (+1.8 m/s); 11.67 (NWI)	Klodiana Shala	6 July 2005; 24 July 2006	Bar; Tirana	
Guam	11.76 (+1.0 m/s)	Regine Tugade	20 June 2024	Majuro	
Tanzania	11.77 (?); 11.63 (NWI)	Nzaeli Kyomo	25 July 1980; 29 August 1989	Moscow; Tampere	
South Sudan	11.77 (−0.2 m/s)	Lucia Moris	11 April 2026	Lang'ata	
South Sudan	11.77 (−1.3 m/s)	Lucia Moris	12 May 2026	Accra	
Nicaragua	11.79 (+1.8 m/s)	María Carmona	28 June 2025	San Salvador	
Pakistan	11.81 (?); 11.81 (+1.1 m/s)	Sadaf Siddiqui; Naseem Hameed	22 April 2008; 8 February 2010	Lahore; Dhaka	
Ethiopia	11.82 (−0.2 m/s); 11.5 h (NWI)	Tegest Tamangnu; Yabsira Jarso Guyo	10 August 2014; 29 March 2022	Marrakesh; Hawassa	
Bermuda	11.84 (+0.2 m/s); 11.28 (NWI) (Note: Not accepted by World Athletics due to the absence of a wind reading, but listed by them as Bermuda's national record); 11.46 (NWI)	Debbie Jones; Raneika Bean; Debbie Jones	24 July 1976; 11 April 1998; 15 April 1977	Montreal; Port-of-Spain; Knoxville	
Armenia	11.84 (+0.3 m/s); 11.54 (+1.3 m/s) (Note: Not ratified or later rescinded by the Armenian Athletic Federation); 11.59 (±0.0 m/s)	Diana Khubeseryan; Gayane Chiloyan; Diana Khubeseryan	6 June 2015; 28 May 2016; 24 May 2016	Krasnodar; Artashat; Almaty	
Lesotho	11.84 (+0.8 m/s) A	Mamakoli Senauoane	21 March 2026	Maseru	
Maldives	11.87 (+1.1 m/s)	Mariyam Ru Ya Ali	25 May 2024	Kingston	
Samoa	11.94 (NWI)	Talava Tavui	27 April 2006	San Mateo	
Bangladesh	11.95 (+1.0 m/s); 11.6 h (NWI)	Shirin Akter	23 September 2022; 2 April 2021	Dhaka; Dhaka	
Guinea	11.97 (+1.1 m/s)	Safiatou Acquaviva	2 August 2024	Paris	
Turks and Caicos Islands	11.99 (+1.2 m/s)	Akia Guerrier	29 July 2018	Barranquilla	
Bosnia and Herzegovina	12.00 (+0.6 m/s)	Neira Bosnić	18 February 2023	Zenica	
Saudi Arabia	12.02 (−0.5 m/s)	Hibah Mohammed M. Mohammed	24 September 2026	Nagoya	
Honduras	12.10 (−0.5 m/s)	Pastora Chávez	26 July 1996	Atlanta	
Palestine	12.16 (+0.8 m/s)	Hanna Barakat	30 July 2021	Tokyo	
Gibraltar	12.55 (−0.8 m/s)	Sharon Mifsud	24 June 1991	Mariehamn	
Libya	12.60 (+0.8 m/s)	Hedil Aboud Fethi	20 April 2018	Amman	
Solomon Islands	12.64 (+0.3 m/s); 12.3 h (NWI)	Jenny Keni	23 August 2003; 3 August 2004	Saint-Denis; Cairns	
American Samoa	12.78 (±0.0 m/s)	Filomenaleonisa Iakopo	2 August 2024	Paris	
United Arab Emirates	13.07 (+1.8 m/s)	Abeer Al-Blooshi	16 May 2022	Kuwait City	
Montserrat	13.17 (NWI)	Tenecia Pollard	28 May 2005	St. John's	
Afghanistan	13.23 (−0.9 m/s)	Marwa Saleem	3 July 2021	Toronto	
Djibouti	13.45 (NWI)	Fathia Ali Bouraleh	30 April 2008	Addis Ababa	
