= Comoros at the Paralympics =

- IPC code: COM
- NPC: Comité National Paralympic des Comores
- Medals: Gold 0 Silver 0 Bronze 0 Total 0

Summer appearances
- 2012; 2016; 2020–2024

Comoros made its Paralympic Games debut at the 2012 Summer Paralympics in London, sending one representative (Hassani Ahamada Djaé) to compete in swimming.

== Medal tables ==
=== Medals by Summer Games ===
Games	Athletes	Gold	Silver	Bronze	Total	Rank
2012 London	1	0	0	0	0	-
2016 Rio de Janeiro	1	0	0	0	0	-
2020 Tokyo	Did not participate					
2024 Paris	Did not participate					
2028 Los Angeles	Future Event					
2032 Brisbane	Future Event					
Total		0	0	0	0	-

== See also ==
- Comoros at the Olympics
