= Comoros at the 2016 Summer Paralympics =

- IPC code: COM
- NPC: Comité National Paralympic des Comores

in Rio de Janeiro
- Competitors: 1 in 1 sports
- Medals: Gold 0 Silver 0 Bronze 0 Total 0

Summer Paralympics appearances (overview)
- 2012; 2016; 2020–2024

Comoros was scheduled to compete at the 2016 Summer Paralympics in Rio de Janeiro, Brazil, from 7 September to 18 September 2016.

== Background ==
Comoros made its Paralympic debut at the 2012 Summer Paralympics four years prior in London. The 2016 Summer Paralympics were held from 7–18 September 2016, a total of 4,328 athletes representing 159 National Paralympic Committees took part. The Comoros team failed to show up to the Games.

== Disability classifications ==
Every participant at the Paralympics has their disability grouped into one of five disability categories; amputation, the condition may be congenital or sustained through injury or illness; cerebral palsy; wheelchair athletes, there is often overlap between this and other categories; visual impairment, including blindness; Les autres, any physical disability that does not fall strictly under one of the other categories, for example dwarfism or multiple sclerosis. Each Paralympic sport then has its own classifications, dependent upon the specific physical demands of competition. Events are given a code, made of numbers and letters, describing the type of event and classification of the athletes competing. Some sports, such as athletics, divide athletes by both the category and severity of their disabilities, other sports, for example swimming, group competitors from different categories together, the only separation being based on the severity of the disability.

== Swimming ==
Men

Athlete	Events	Heats		Final	
Athlete	Events	Time	Rank	Time	Rank
Ahamada Hassani	50 m freestyle S9	did not start		did not advance	

== See also ==
- Comoros at the 2016 Summer Olympics
