= Comoros at the 2024 Summer Olympics =

- IOC code: COM
- NOC: Comité Olympique et Sportif des Iles Comores

in Paris, France 26 July 2024 – 11 August 2024
- Competitors: 4 (3 men and 1 woman) in 3 sports
- Flag bearers (opening): Hachim Maaroufou & Maesha Saadi
- Flag bearers (closing): Hachim Maaroufou & Maesha Saadi
- Medals: Gold 0 Silver 0 Bronze 0 Total 0

Summer Olympics appearances (overview)
- 1996; 2000; 2004; 2008; 2012; 2016; 2020; 2024

The Comoros competed at the 2024 Summer Olympics in Paris from 26 July to 11 August 2024. Since the nation made its debut in 1996, Comorian athletes have participated in every edition of the Summer Olympic Games.

== Competitors ==
The following is the list of number of competitors in the Games.

Sport	Men	Women	Total
Athletics	1	0	1
Canoeing	1	0	1
Swimming	1	1	2
Total	3	1	4

== Athletics ==
Comoros sent one sprinter to compete at the 2024 Summer Olympics.

Key

- Note–Ranks given for track events are within the athlete's heat only
- Q = Qualified for the next round
- q = Qualified for the next round as a fastest loser or, in field events, by position without achieving the qualifying target
- NR = National record
- N/A = Round not applicable for the event
- Bye = Athlete not required to compete in round

Track events

Athlete	Event	Preliminary		Round 1		Semifinal		Final	
Athlete	Event	Result	Rank	Result	Rank	Result	Rank	Result	Rank
Hachim Maaroufou	Men's 100 m	10.44	3 q	10.52	9	Did not advance			

== Canoeing ==
=== Slalom ===
The Comoros received a universality invitational quota spot, marking the nation's debut in slalom and in canoeing in general.

Athlete	Event	Preliminary						Semifinal		Final	
Athlete	Event	Run 1	Rank	Run 2	Rank	Best	Rank	Time	Rank	Time	Rank
Andy Barat	Men's K-1	105.82	22	107.59	20	105.82	24	Did not advance			

Kayak cross

Athlete	Event	Time trial		Round 1	Repechage	Heat	Quarterfinal	Semifinal	Final	
Athlete	Event	Time	Rank	Position	Position	Position	Position	Position	Position	Rank
Andy Barat	Men's KX-1	76.95	30	3 R	4	Did not advance				38

== Swimming ==
For the first time since 2016, Comoros sent two swimmers to compete at the 2024 Paris Olympics.

Athlete	Event	Heat		Semifinal		Final	
Athlete	Event	Time	Rank	Time	Rank	Time	Rank
Hassane Hadji	Men's 100 m freestyle	1:07.21	79	Did not advance			
Maesha Saadi	Women's 50 m freestyle	29.60	57	Did not advance			

Qualifiers for the latter rounds (Q) of all events were decided on a time only basis, therefore positions shown are overall results versus competitors in all heats.
