= Ahamada Haoulata (athlete) =

Comorian athletics competitor

Personal information
- Born: 1975 (age 50–51) Comoros
- Education: Institut national de la jeunesse et des sports, 2002; Cheikh Anta Diop University, 2018
- Occupations: Athlete; educator; civil servant

Sport
- Country: Comoros
- Sport: 400 meters

Ahamada Haoulata (born 1975) is a Comorian athlete, educator and civil servant. Haoulata is known for being the first Comorian female athlete to participate in the Olympics.

== Biography ==
Haoulata was born in 1975 in Comoros.

In 1996, Haoulata earned her Baccalauréat from Lycée Saïd Mohamed Cheikh in Moroni. The same year Haoulata competed in the 400 metres at the 1996 Summer Olympics, where she set the Comoros national record of 1:03.44. In 1999, Haoulata completed in the 7th World Championships in Athletics in the 400 meters.

Haoulata later studied in Côte d'Ivoire, where she awarded a Bachelor's in Science and Techniques of Physical and Sports Activities. In 2002, Haoulata graduated with a Master's from the Institut national de la jeunesse et des sports. Haoulata also obtained a Certificate of aptitude for secondary school teachers.

Upon returning to Comoros Haoulata worked as a physical education teacher. From 2006 to 2016, Haoulata was the director of the OlympAfrica Centre in Mitsoudjé.

In 2018, Haoulata graduated from Cheikh Anta Diop University with a Master's in Physical Activity and Leisure Management. In November 2018, Haoulata was appointed the National Sports Inspector at the Ministry of Youth and Sports.
