= Swimming at the 2012 Summer Olympics – Women's 100 metre freestyle =

Women's 100 metre freestyle at the Games of the XXX Olympiad
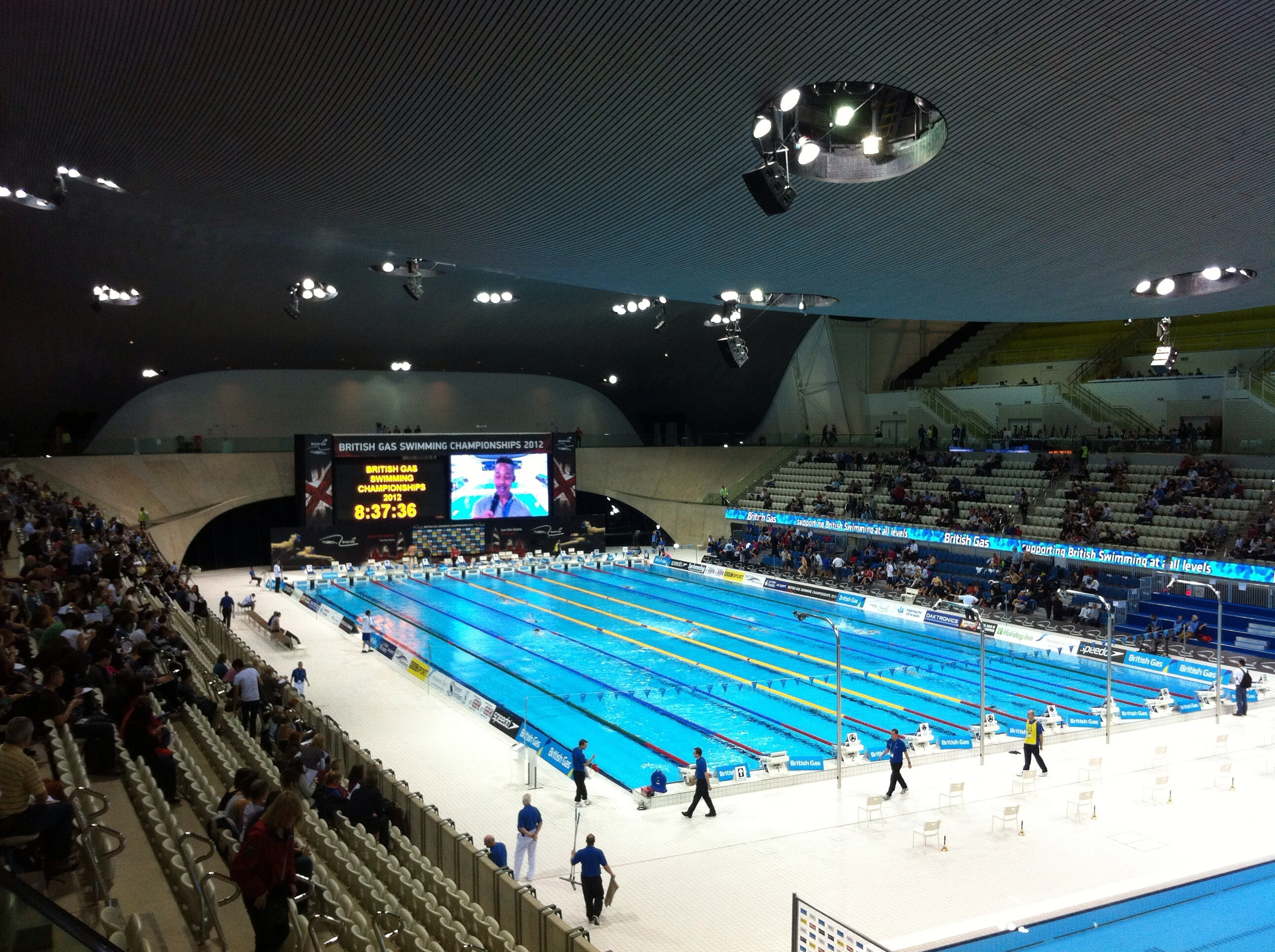
- The London 2012 Aquatics Centre
- Venue: London Aquatics Centre
- Date: 1 August 1, 2012 (heats & semifinals); 2 August 2012 (final)
- Competitors: 50 from 44 nations
- Winning time: 53.00 OR

Medalists
1st place, gold medalist(s)		Ranomi Kromowidjojo; Netherlands
2nd place, silver medalist(s)		Aliaksandra Herasimenia; Belarus
3rd place, bronze medalist(s)		Tang Yi; China

The women's 100 metre freestyle event at the 2012 Summer Olympics took place on 1–2 August 2012 at the London Aquatics Centre in London, United Kingdom.

Dutch swimmer Ranomi Kromowidjojo swam to a new Olympic record to become the country's third gold medalist in the event, along with Rie Mastenbroek in 1936 and Inge de Bruijn in 2000. In fourth place at the halfway turn, she pulled ahead of a tightly packed field to touch the wall first and improve her own record in 53.00. Belarus' Aliaksandra Herasimenia was in the lead on the first length under a world-record pace, but faded down the stretch to win the silver medal in 53.38. China's Tang Yi swam a fast final lap for the bronze medal in 53.44.

Australia's Melanie Schlanger finished fourth in 53.47, while American teenage sensation Missy Franklin finished in fifth place in 53.64. Great Britain's home favorite Francesca Halsall (53.66), Denmark's Jeanette Ottesen (53.75), who shared the title with Herasimenia at the 2011 World Championships, and U.S. swimmer Jessica Hardy (54.02) finished in sixth through eighth place.

Before the breakthrough finale, Kromowidjojo swam a top-seeded time of 53.05 to slice 0.07 seconds off the previous Olympic record set by Germany's defending champion Britta Steffen, who later missed the final roster with a twelfth-place finish (54.18) in the semifinals.

Only 48 of the 50 swimmers registered in the event competed. Sweden's five-time Olympian Therese Alshammar suffered a pinched nerve in her neck, and skipped most of her events. Australia's Cate Campbell scratched her first individual race because of a glandular fever, leaving Mel Schlanger as Australia's only swimmer in the heats, who advanced to the final, finishing fourth.

== Records ==
Prior to this competition, the existing world and Olympic records were:

World record	Britta Steffen (GER)	52.07	Rome, Italy	31 July 2009
Olympic record	Britta Steffen (GER)	53.12	Beijing, China	15 August 2008

The following records were established during the competition:

Date	Event	Name	Nationality	Time	Record
August 1	Semifinal 2	Ranomi Kromowidjojo	Netherlands	53.05	OR
August 2	Final	Ranomi Kromowidjojo	Netherlands	53.00	OR

== Results ==
=== Heats ===
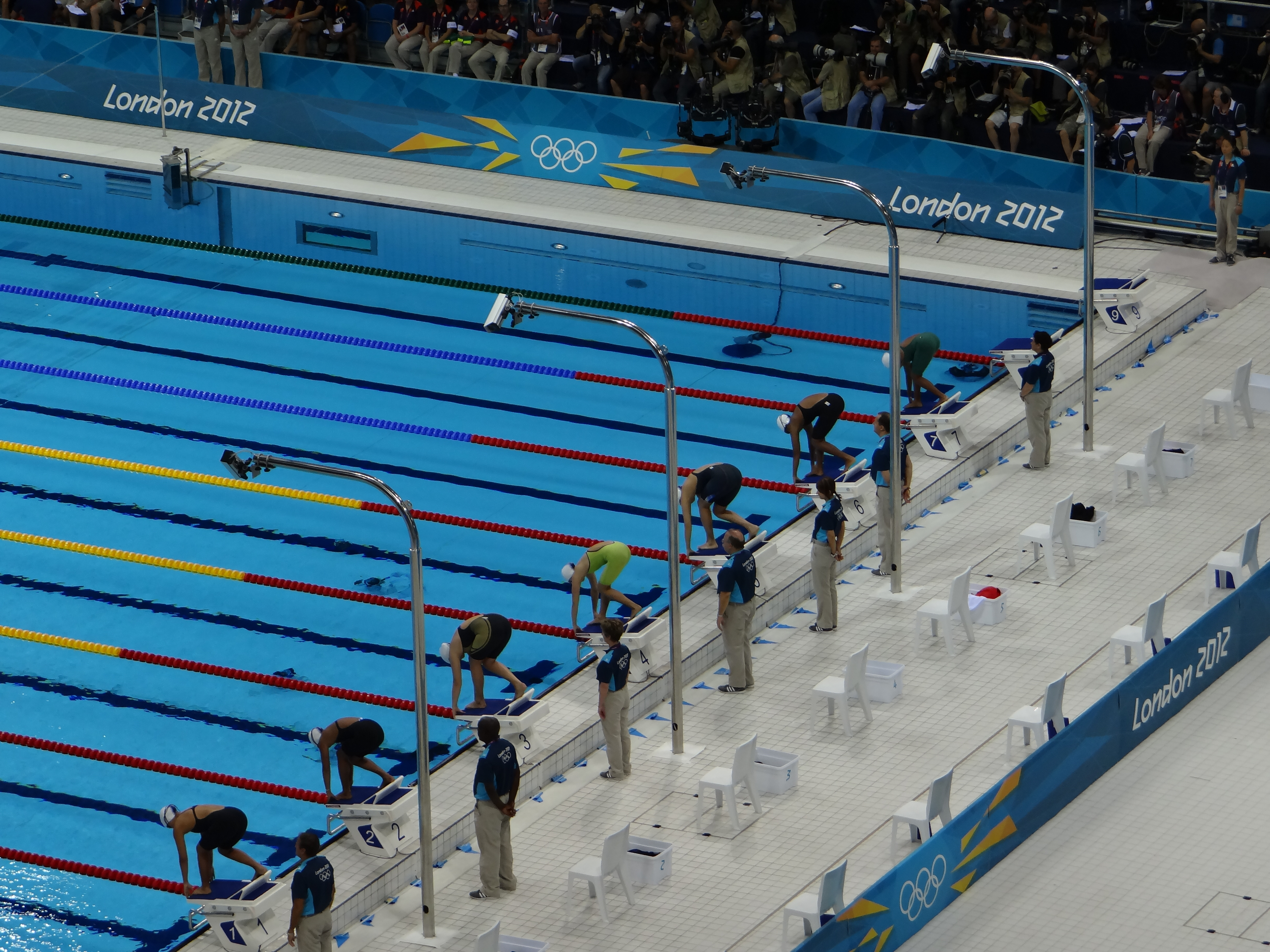
One of the heats during the qualification

Rank	Heat	Lane	Name	Nationality	Time	Notes
1	5	3	Tang Yi	China	53.28	Q
2	7	6	Melanie Schlanger	Australia	53.50	Q
3	5	4	Jeanette Ottesen	Denmark	53.51	Q
4	7	5	Aliaksandra Herasimenia	Belarus	53.63	Q, NR
5	7	4	Ranomi Kromowidjojo	Netherlands	53.66	Q
6	6	7	Arianna Vanderpool-Wallace	Bahamas	53.73	Q, NR
7	6	5	Francesca Halsall	Great Britain	54.02	Q
8	5	6	Jessica Hardy	United States	54.09	Q
9	6	1	Julia Wilkinson	Canada	54.16	Q
10	6	4	Sarah Sjöström	Sweden	54.26	Q
10	7	3	Missy Franklin	United States	54.26	Q
12	7	2	Haruka Ueda	Japan	54.35	Q
13	6	2	Amy Smith	Great Britain	54.37	Q
14	6	3	Britta Steffen	Germany	54.42	Q
15	5	5	Femke Heemskerk	Netherlands	54.43	Q
15	5	7	Daniela Schreiber	Germany	54.43	Q
17	7	7	Veronika Popova	Russia	54.66	
18	6	8	Hanna-Maria Seppälä	Finland	54.93	
19	5	2	Pernille Blume	Denmark	55.04	
20	7	8	Charlotte Bonnet	France	55.12	
21	5	1	Hannah Wilson	Hong Kong	55.33	
22	4	4	Burcu Dolunay	Turkey	55.35	
23	3	4	Eszter Dara	Hungary	55.37	
24	4	2	Nina Rangelova	Bulgaria	55.52	NR
25	3	5	Liliana Ibáñez	Mexico	55.71	NR
26	4	6	Daynara de Paula	Brazil	55.94	
27	4	3	Katarzyna Wilk	Poland	56.13	
28	3	3	Nastja Govejšek	Slovenia	56.21	
29	3	2	Mylene Ong	Singapore	56.33	
29	4	7	Rūta Meilutytė	Lithuania	56.33	
31	4	8	Katarína Filová	Slovakia	56.58	
32	5	8	Nery Mantey Niangkouara	Greece	56.63	
33	4	5	Arlene Semeco	Venezuela	56.90	
34	3	6	Jasmine Alkhaldi	Philippines	57.13	
35	3	1	Megan Fonteno	American Samoa	57.45	
35	4	1	Miroslava Najdanovski	Serbia	57.45	
37	3	7	Karen Torrez	Bolivia	57.78	NR
38	3	8	Clelia Tini	San Marino	58.29	
39	2	3	Jade Howard	Zambia	59.35	
40	2	5	Bayan Jumah	Syria	59.78	
41	2	4	Karen Riveros	Paraguay	59.86	
42	2	6	Brittany van Lange	Guyana	1:01.62	
43	2	2	Estellah Fils Rabetsara	Madagascar	1:02.39	
44	2	7	Reshika Udugampola	Sri Lanka	1:04.93	
45	2	1	Magdalena Moshi	Tanzania	1:05.80	
46	1	4	Mareme Faye	Senegal	1:06.42	
47	1	5	Shreya Dhital	Nepal	1:10.80	
48	1	3	Ayouba Ali Sihame	Comoros	1:14.40	
	6	6	Cate Campbell	Australia	DNS	
	7	1	Therese Alshammar	Sweden	DNS	

=== Semifinals ===
==== Semifinal 1 ====
Rank	Lane	Name	Nationality	Time	Notes
1	4	Melanie Schlanger	Australia	53.38	Q
2	5	Aliaksandra Herasimenia	Belarus	53.78	Q
3	6	Jessica Hardy	United States	53.86	Q
4	2	Sarah Sjöström	Sweden	53.93	
5	3	Arianna Vanderpool-Wallace	Bahamas	54.12	
6	1	Britta Steffen	Germany	54.18	
7	8	Daniela Schreiber	Germany	54.39	
8	7	Haruka Ueda	Japan	54.59	

==== Semifinal 2 ====
Rank	Lane	Name	Nationality	Time	Notes
1	3	Ranomi Kromowidjojo	Netherlands	53.05	Q, OR
2	7	Missy Franklin	United States	53.59	Q
3	4	Tang Yi	China	53.60	Q
4	5	Jeanette Ottesen	Denmark	53.77	Q
4	6	Francesca Halsall	Great Britain	53.77	Q
6	8	Femke Heemskerk	Netherlands	54.13	
7	2	Julia Wilkinson	Canada	54.25	
8	1	Amy Smith	Great Britain	54.28	

=== Final ===
Rank	Lane	Name	Nationality	Time	Notes
1st place, gold medalist(s)	4	Ranomi Kromowidjojo	Netherlands	53.00	OR
2nd place, silver medalist(s)	1	Aliaksandra Herasimenia	Belarus	53.38	NR
3rd place, bronze medalist(s)	6	Tang Yi	China	53.44	
4	5	Melanie Schlanger	Australia	53.47	
5	3	Missy Franklin	United States	53.64	
6	7	Francesca Halsall	Great Britain	53.66	
7	2	Jeanette Ottesen	Denmark	53.75	
8	8	Jessica Hardy	United States	54.02	
