= Comoros at the 2011 World Championships in Athletics =

- WA code: COM
- National federation: Fédération Comorienne d'Athlétisme

in Daegu
- Competitors: 2
- Medals: Gold 0 Silver 0 Bronze 0 Total 0

World Championships in Athletics appearances
- 1983; 1987; 1991; 1993; 1995; 1997; 1999; 2001; 2003; 2005; 2007; 2009; 2011; 2013; 2015; 2017; 2019; 2022; 2023

The Comoros competed at the 2011 World Championships in Athletics from August 27 to September 4 in Daegu, South Korea. Two athletes represented the country in the event.

== Results ==
=== Men ===
Athlete	Event	Preliminaries		Heats		Semifinals		Final	
Athlete	Event	Time	Rank	Time	Rank	Time	Rank	Time	Rank
Moudjib Toyb	100 metres	11.07 Q	13	11.12	54	Did not advance			

=== Women ===
Athlete	Event	Preliminaries		Heats		Semifinals		Final	
Athlete	Event	Time	Rank	Time	Rank	Time	Rank	Time	Rank
Feta Ahamada	100 metres	12.27 Q, SB	8	12.21	43	Did not advance			
