= Comoros at the 2008 Summer Olympics =

- IOC code: COM
- NOC: Olympic and Sports Committee of the Comoros

in Beijing
- Competitors: 3 in 2 sports
- Flag bearer: Feta Ahamada
- Medals: Gold 0 Silver 0 Bronze 0 Total 0

Summer Olympics appearances (overview)
- 1996; 2000; 2004; 2008; 2012; 2016; 2020; 2024; 2028

Comoros took part in the 2008 Summer Olympics, held in Beijing, China from 8 to 24 August 2008. It was Comoros's fourth appearance in the summer Olympics since its debut in 1996. The Comoros team included three athletes: runners Mhadjou Youssouf and Feta Ahamada, and swimmer Mohamed Attoumane. Ahamada, a 100 metres sprinter, was the flag bearer for the opening ceremony, the first woman to be given the honour. None of the Comoros athletes progressed further than the qualifying heats.

== Background ==
Comoros had participated in the three previous Summer Olympics, debuting in the 1996 Summer Olympics in Atlanta. At their debut, the country sent four athletes to the games, all of whom competed in athletics; it remains their largest delegation as of 2014. No Comorian athlete has ever won a medal at an Olympic Games.

Three athletes from Comoros were selected to compete in the 2008 Olympics: Mhadjou Youssouf in the men's track and field 100 metres, Feta Ahamada in the women's track and field 100 metres and Mohamed Attoumane in the men's 50 metre freestyle swimming.

== Athletics ==
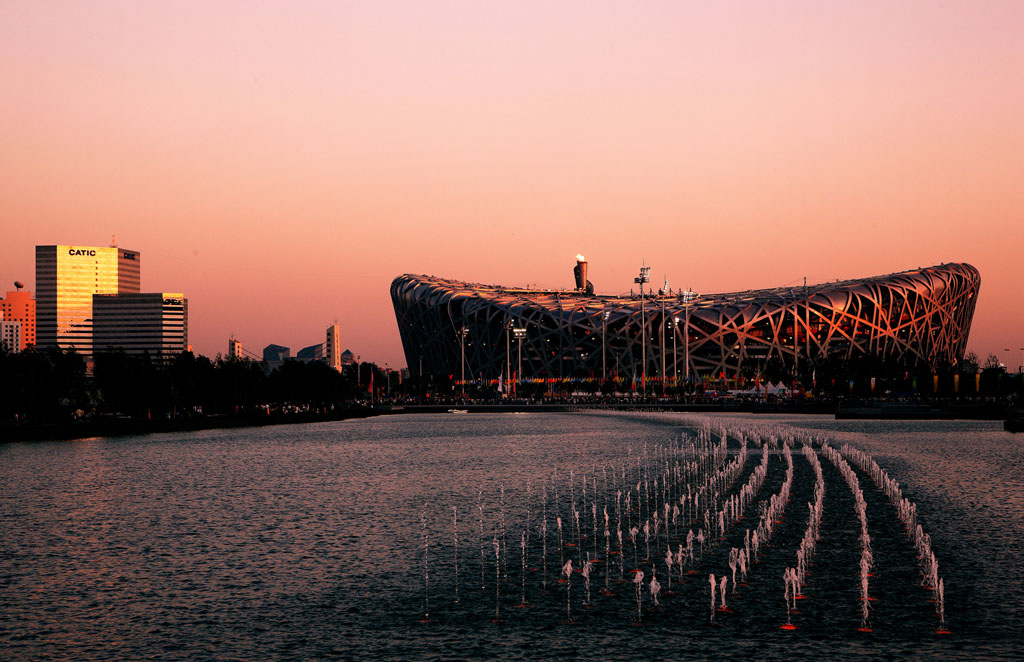
The Beijing National Stadium, where Youssouf and Ahamada competed in their respective events

At the 2008 Olympics, Comoros was represented by one male athlete in athletics, sprinter Mhadjou Youssouf. At age 18, Youssouf was the country's youngest competitor, and was competing at his first Olympics. He competed in the 100 metres on 15 August in Beijing, and finished 6th out of 8 in heat five. His time of 10.62 seconds was a personal best, which, as of October 2014, is still his personal best. Overall, Youssouf finished 55th out of 80 competitors. The fastest athlete was Tyrone Edgar (10.13 seconds) and the slowest athlete that progressed to the quarterfinals was Uchenna Emedolu (10.46 seconds). Youssouf, who was 0.16 seconds behind Emedolu, did not progress to the quarterfinals.

Competing at her first Olympics, Feta Ahamada was the only woman competing in the track and field events at the 2008 Summer Olympics for the Comoros. She competed in the 100 metre event on 19 August. Ahamada, drawn into heat seven for the event, ran a time of 11.88 seconds and finished sixth in her heat, 0.55 seconds behind the winner, Ivet Lalova. She finished 52nd out of 85 athletes overall and was 2.92 seconds faster than the slowest athlete, Robina Muqimyar. Ahamada was 0.75 seconds behind the fastest athlete (Oludamola Osayomi) and 0.23 seconds behind the slowest athlete who progressed to the quarterfinals, Thi Huong Vu. Therefore, Ahamada did not progress to the quarterfinals.

Track

Athlete	Event	Heat		Quarterfinal		Semifinal		Final	
Athlete	Event	Result	Rank	Result	Rank	Result	Rank	Result	Rank
Mhadjou Youssouf	Men's 100 m	10.62	6	did not advance					
Feta Ahamada	Women's 100 m	11.88	6	did not advance					

== Swimming ==
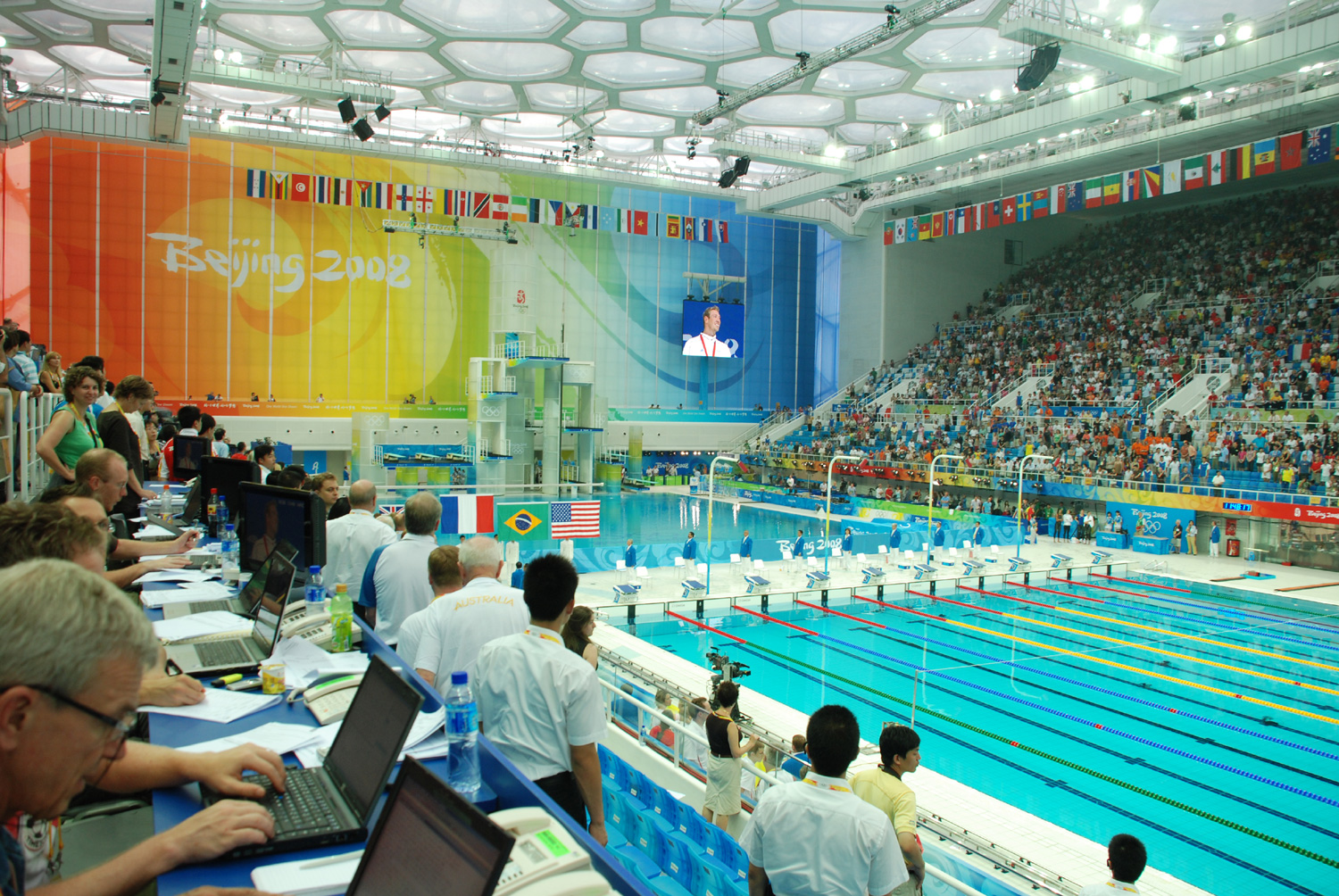
The Beijing National Aquatics Center is where Attoumane competed in their events.

Mohamed Attoumane represented Comoros as its only swimmer competing in the Beijing Olympics. The oldest Comorian at the games, Attoumane, took part in the men's 50 metre freestyle race. He was born in September 1981, and was 26 years old when he appeared for his races. Attoumane had not previously competed at any Olympic games. Attoumane competed in heat six of the preliminaries on 14 August. He finished last in his eight-man heat in a time of 29.63 seconds, 5.63 seconds behind the heat winner, Yellow Yeiyah. Out of the ninety-seven swimmers competing in the event, Attoumane finished 91st. He was 8.17 seconds behind the fastest athlete, Amaury Leveaux, and was 7.46 seconds behind the slowest athlete that progressed to the semi-finals, Gideon Louw.

Men

Athlete	Event	Heat		Semifinal		Final	
Athlete	Event	Time	Rank	Time	Rank	Time	Rank
Mohamed Attoumane	50 m freestyle	29.63	91	did not advance			
