= Comoros at the 2016 Summer Olympics =

- IOC code: COM
- NOC: Comité Olympique et Sportif des Iles Comores

in Rio de Janeiro
- Competitors: 4 in 2 sports
- Flag bearer: Nazlati Mohamed Andhumdine
- Medals: Gold 0 Silver 0 Bronze 0 Total 0

Summer Olympics appearances (overview)
- 1996; 2000; 2004; 2008; 2012; 2016; 2020; 2024

Comoros competed at the 2016 Summer Olympics in Rio de Janeiro, Brazil, from 5 to 21 August 2016. This was the nation's sixth consecutive appearance at the Summer Olympics.

Four Comorian athletes were selected to the team for the Games, competing only in athletics and swimming, Three of them made their Olympic debut in Rio de Janeiro, with hurdler Maoulida Daroueche returning for his second appearance after London 2012. Freestyle swimmer Nazlati Mohamed Andhumdine served as the nation's flag bearer in the opening ceremony. Comoros, has yet to win its first Olympic medal.

== Athletics ==
Comoros has received universality slots from IAAF to send two athletes (one male and one female) to the Olympics.

Key

- Note–Ranks given for track events are within the athlete's heat only
- Q = Qualified for the next round
- q = Qualified for the next round as a fastest loser or, in field events, by position without achieving the qualifying target
- NR = National record
- N/A = Round not applicable for the event
- Bye = Athlete not required to compete in round

Track & road events

Athlete	Event	Heat		Quarterfinal		Semifinal		Final	
Athlete	Event	Time	Rank	Time	Rank	Time	Rank	Time	Rank
Maoulida Daroueche	Men's 400 m hurdles	52.32	8	—N/a		did not advance			
Denika Kassim	Women's 100 m	12.53	5	did not advance					

== Swimming ==
Comoros have received a Universality invitation from FINA to send two swimmers (one male and one female) to the Olympics.

Athlete	Event	Heat		Semifinal		Final	
Athlete	Event	Time	Rank	Time	Rank	Time	Rank
Athoumane Solihi	Men's 50 m freestyle	27.31	76	did not advance			
Nazlati Mohamed Andhumdine	Women's 50 m freestyle	37.66	86	did not advance			
