= Richalda Mohamed =

Comorian athletics competitor

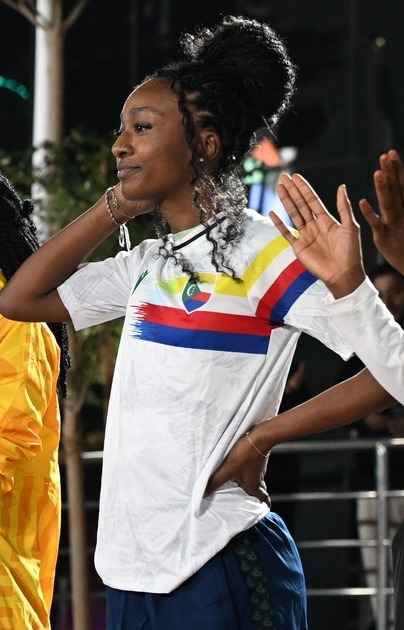
- Richalda Mohamed in 2025

Personal information
- Born: 3 July 2001 (age 25)

Sport
- Sport: Long jump

Richalda Mohamed (born 3 July 2001) is a Comorian track and field athlete of French origin who specializes in the long jump and has been eligible to compete for the Comoros since November 2025. She currently holds the national record in the long jump.

== Sporting career ==
Richalda Mohamed started athletics at the age of 9. She gained her first experience at international championships in 2025, when she achieved fifth place in the long jump with a new national record of 5.81 m at the Islamic Solidarity Games in Riyadh and ninth place in the triple jump with 12.57 m.

== Personal bests ==
- Long jump: 6.18 m (+1.9 m/s), June 18, 2023, in Cergy-Pontoise
- Long jump: 5.81 m (+1.0 m/s), November 19, 2025, in Riyadh (Comorian record)
- Triple jump: 13.11 m, December 28, 2023, in Nantes

== See also ==
- List of Comorian records in athletics
- List of eligibility transfers in athletics
