= Comoros at the 2012 Summer Paralympics =

- IPC code: COM
- NPC: Comité National Paralympic des Comores

in London
- Competitors: 1 in 1 sport
- Flag bearer: Ahamada Djae Hassani
- Medals: Gold 0 Silver 0 Bronze 0 Total 0

Summer Paralympics appearances (overview)
- 2012; 2016; 2020–2024

Comoros competed at the 2012 Summer Paralympics in London, United Kingdom from August 29 to September 9, 2012. Comoros was represented by one swimmer, Hassani Ahamada Djae, who did not qualify for the finals. He was coached by Soulaimana Bacari.

== Swimming ==
Men

Athletes	Event	Heat		Final	
Athletes	Event	Time	Rank	Time	Rank
Hassani Ahamada Djae	50m freestyle S9	DSQ		Did not advance	

== See also ==
- Comoros at the Paralympics
- Comoros at the 2012 Summer Olympics
