= Ayouba Ali Sihame =

Comorian swimmer (born 1994)

Personal information
- Nationality: COM
- Born: August 15, 1994 (age 31) Itsandra Mdjini
- Height: 1.61 m (5 ft 3 in)
- Weight: 50 kg (110 lb)

Sport
- Sport: Swimming
- Strokes: Freestyle

Ayouba Ali Sihame is a Comorian swimmer. At the 2012 Summer Olympics, she competed in the Women's 100 metre freestyle, finishing in 48th place overall in the heats, failing to qualify for the semifinals.

After finishing her 2012 Olympics run, Sihame disappeared in London rather than returning to Comoros. She was later arrested for attempting to enter France using a fake passport. She said that this was due to a forced and paid marriage made by her family in Comoros between her and a then 60-year-old man, as they sought to capitalize on her status and worth as an Olympic-level athlete.
