= Comoros at the 1996 Summer Olympics =

- IOC code: COM
- NOC: Comité Olympique et Sportif des Iles Comores

in Atlanta
- Competitors: 4 in 1 sport
- Flag bearer: Faissoil Ben Douad
- Medals: Gold 0 Silver 0 Bronze 0 Total 0

Summer Olympics appearances (overview)
- 1996; 2000; 2004; 2008; 2012; 2016; 2020; 2024

Comoros competed at the 1996 Summer Olympics in Atlanta, United States, which were held from 19 July to 4 August 1996. The country's participation in Atlanta marked its first appearance at the Summer Olympics. The Comorian athlete delegation consisted of four competitors: Mohamed Bakar, Hadhari Djaffar, Hassan Abdou, and Ahamada Haoulata, all competing in sprinting events at the games.

Bakad, Abdou, and Haoulata all competed on the same day on 26 July, while Djaffar competed three days later. They competed in the heats of the men's 100 metres, men's 400 metres, women's 400 metres, and men's 200 metres respectively. They all placed last in their rounds and did not medal.

== Background ==
The 1996 Summer Olympics were held in Atlanta, United States, from 19 July to 4 August 1996. The Comité Olympique et Sportif des Iles Comores (the National Olympic Committee (NOC) of Comoros) was recognized by the International Olympic Committee on 1 January 1993. Comoros' appearance at the Games was its first ever appearance at the Summer Olympics.

== Competitors ==
List of Comorian competitors at the 1996 Summer Olympics
Sport	Men	Women	Total
Athletics	3	1	4
Total	3	1	4

== Athletics ==
=== Men ===
Mohamed Bakar competed in the heats of the men's 100 metres on 26 July. Competing against eight athletes in the third heat, he had placed last with a time of 11.02 seconds and did not advance further. On the same day, Hassan Abdou would compete in the heats of the men's 400 metres. Abdou had run in a time of 50.17 seconds against seven other people in his heat, also placing last and not advancing further. Hadhari Djaffar competed last for the nation, doing so in the heats of the men's 200 metres on 31 July. In the fifth heat against seven other competitors, he had run in a time of 22.68 and also placed last, not advancing further.

Track and road events

Athletes	Events	Heat Round 1		Heat Round 2		Semifinal		Final	
Athletes	Events	Time	Rank	Time	Rank	Time	Rank	Time	Rank
Mohamed Bakar	100 metres	11.02	95	did not advance					
Hadhari Djaffar	200 metres	22.68	76	did not advance					
Hassan Abdou	400 metres	50.17	57	did not advance					

=== Women ===
Ahamada Haoulata would be the only female competitor for Comoros at these Olympics. She competed in the heats of the women's 400 metres on 26 July. She had run in a time of 1:03.44 in her heat and placed last, not advancing further.

Track and road events

Athletes	Events	Heat Round 1		Heat Round 2		Semifinal		Final	
Athletes	Events	Time	Rank	Time	Rank	Time	Rank	Time	Rank
Ahamada Haoulata	400 metres	1:03.44	48	did not advance					
