= Comoros at the Olympics =

- IOC code: COM
- NOC: Comité Olympique et Sportif des Iles Comores
- Medals: Gold 0 Silver 0 Bronze 0 Total 0

Summer appearances
- 1996; 2000; 2004; 2008; 2012; 2016; 2020; 2024

Comoros first participated at the Olympic Games in 1996, and has sent athletes to compete in every Summer Olympic Games since then. The nation has never participated in the Winter Olympic Games.

As of 2024, no athlete from Comoros has ever won an Olympic medal.

The National Olympic Committee for Comoros was created in 1979 and recognized by the International Olympic Committee in 1993.

== Medal tables ==
=== Medals by Summer Games ===
Games	Athletes	Gold	Silver	Bronze	Total	Rank
(United States) 1996 Atlanta	4	0	0	0	0	–
(Australia) 2000 Sydney	2	0	0	0	0	–
(Greece) 2004 Athens	3	0	0	0	0	–
(China) 2008 Beijing	3	0	0	0	0	–
(United Kingdom) 2012 London	3	0	0	0	0	–
(Brazil) 2016 Rio de Janeiro	4	0	0	0	0	–
(Japan) 2020 Tokyo	3	0	0	0	0	–
(France) 2024 Paris	4	0	0	0	0	–
(United States) 2028 Los Angeles	future event					
(Australia) 2032 Brisbane	future event					
Total		0	0	0	0	–

== See also ==
- List of flag bearers for Comoros at the Olympics
- Category:Olympic competitors for the Comoros
