= Comoros at the 2000 Summer Olympics =

- IOC code: COM
- NOC: Comité Olympique et Sportif des Iles Comores

in Sydney
- Competitors: 2
- Flag bearer: Shareef Mohammed
- Medals: Gold 0 Silver 0 Bronze 0 Total 0

Summer Olympics appearances (overview)
- 1996; 2000; 2004; 2008; 2012; 2016; 2020; 2024

Comoros sent a delegation to compete at the 2000 Summer Olympics in Sydney, Australia from 15 September to 1 October 2000. This was the Indian Ocean nation's second appearance at a Summer Olympic Games, following their debut four years earlier at the 1996 Atlanta Olympics. The delegation consisted of two track and field athletes: Hadhari Djaffar and Sandjema Batouli. Both raced in the 100 meters events, but neither advanced beyond the first round.

== Background ==
The Comité Olympique et Sportif des Iles Comores (the National Olympic Committee (NOC) of the Comoros Islands) was recognized by the International Olympic Committee on 1 January 1993. Comoros joined Olympic competition at the 1996 Summer Olympics and have participated at every Summer Olympic Games since, though the nation has yet to debut at the Winter Olympic Games. Sydney was the second appearance by the nation in a Summer Olympiad. The 2000 Summer Olympics were held from 15 September to 1 October 2000; a total of 10,651 athletes represented 199 NOCs. The Comoros delegation to Sydney consisted of two track and field athletes: Hadhari Djaffar and Sandjema Batouli.

== Competitors ==
The following is the list of number of competitors in the Games.

Sport	Men	Women	Total
Athletics	1	1	2
Total	1	1	2

== Athletics ==
Sandjema Batouli was 18 years old at the time of the Sydney Olympics and was making her only Olympic appearance. On 23 September, she participated in the first round of the women's 100 metres and was drawn into heat nine. She finished the race in a time of 13.58 seconds, ninth and last in her heat, and was not able to progress to the next round. In the event overall, the gold medal is vacant due to original gold medalist Marion Jones of the United States admitting to steroid use and forfeiting her medals and results from the Sydney Games. Officially, the medals in the event are held by Ekaterini Thanou of Greece and Tayna Lawrence (the original bronze medalist) of Jamaica sharing silver, and Merlene Ottey, also of Jamaica, the original fourth-place finisher, being awarded a bronze. Gold was left vacant because Thanou, the original silver medalist, had her own issue with missing a drug test at the 2004 Summer Olympics

Hadhari Djaffar was 21 years old at the time of these Games. He was already a veteran of the 1996 Summer Olympics, and would later go on to represent the Comoros at the 2004 Summer Olympics. On 22 September, he participated in the first round heats of the men's 100 metres and was drawn into heat seven. He completed the race in a time of 10.68 seconds, seventh out of nine competitors in his heat. His time was insufficient to advance, as 10.48 seconds was the slowest qualifying time. The gold medal was eventually won in 9.87 seconds by Maurice Greene of the United States, the silver was won by Ato Boldon of Trinidad and Tobago, and the bronze was earned by Obadele Thompson of Barbados.

Athletes	Events	Heat Round 1		Heat Round 2		Semifinal		Final	
Athletes	Events	Time	Rank	Time	Rank	Time	Rank	Time	Rank
Hadhari Djaffar	Men's 100 metres	10.68	7	Did not advance					
Sandjema Batouli	Women's 100 metres	13.58	9	Did not advance					
