= Comoros at the 2004 Summer Olympics =

- IOC code: COM
- NOC: Olympic and Sports Committee of the Comoros

in Athens
- Competitors: 3 in 2 sports
- Flag bearer: Hadhari Djaffar
- Medals: Gold 0 Silver 0 Bronze 0 Total 0

Summer Olympics appearances (overview)
- 1996; 2000; 2004; 2008; 2012; 2016; 2020; 2024

Comoros was represented at the 2004 Summer Olympics in Athens, Greece by the Olympic and Sports Committee of the Comoros.

In total, three athletes including two men and one woman represented Comoros in two different sports including athletics and weightlifting.

== Background ==
The 2004 Summer Olympics in Athens, Greece marked Comoros' third appearance at the Olympics after the country made its Olympic debut at the 1996 Summer Olympics in Atlanta, Georgia, United States. They had not previously won a medal. The delegation at the 2004 games included one more athlete than the delegation for the 2000 Summer Olympics in Sydney, New South Wales, Australia.

== Competitors ==
In total, three athletes represented Comoros at the 2004 Summer Olympics in Athens, Greece across two different sports.

Sport	Men	Women	Total
Athletics	1	1	2
Weightlifting	0	1	1
Total	1	2	3

== Athletics ==
In total, two Comorian athletes participated in the athletics events – Hadhari Djaffar in the men's 100 m and Salhate Djamalidine in the women's 400 m hurdles.

Most of the athletics events – including those which Comorian athletes took part in – took place at the Athens Olympic Stadium in Marousi, Athens from 18 to 29 August 2004.

The heats for the men's 100 m took place on 21 August 2004. Djaffar finished seventh in his heat in a time of 10.62 seconds and he did not advance to the quarter-finals.

Athlete	Event	Heat		Quarterfinal		Semifinal		Final	
Athlete	Event	Result	Rank	Result	Rank	Result	Rank	Result	Rank
Hadhari Djaffar	100 m	10.62	7	Did not advance					

The heats for the women's 400 m hurdles took place on 21 August 2004. Djamalidine finished seventh in her heat in a time of 59.72 seconds and she did not advance to the semi-finals.

Athlete	Event	Heat		Semifinal		Final	
Athlete	Event	Result	Rank	Result	Rank	Result	Rank
Salhate Djamalidine	400 m hurdles	59.72	7	Did not advance			

== Weightlifting ==
In total, one Comorian athlete participated in the weightlifting events – Chaehoi Fatihou in the men's −85 kg category.

The weightlifting events took place at the Nikaia Olympic Weightlifting Hall in Piraeus, Athens from 15 to 25 August 2004.

The men's −85 kg category took place on 21 August 2004. Fatihou made no valid lift in the snatch and was recorded as did not finish.

Athlete	Event	Snatch		Clean & jerk		Total	Rank
Athlete	Event	Result	Rank	Result	Rank	Total	Rank
Chaehoi Fatihou	Men's −85 kg	~~80~~	DNF	—	—	—	DNF
