= Comoros at the 2020 Summer Olympics =

- IOC code: COM
- NOC: Comité Olympique et Sportif des Iles Comores

in Tokyo July 23, 2021 – August 8, 2021
- Competitors: 3 in 2 sports
- Flag bearers (opening): Amed Elna; Fadane Hamadi
- Flag bearer (closing): Fadane Hamadi
- Medals: Gold 0 Silver 0 Bronze 0 Total 0

Summer Olympics appearances (overview)
- 1996; 2000; 2004; 2008; 2012; 2016; 2020; 2024

Comoros competed at the 2020 Summer Olympics in Tokyo. Originally scheduled to take place from 24 July to 9 August 2020, the Games were later postponed to 23 July to 8 August 2021 due to the COVID-19 pandemic. At the Tokyo Olympics, Comoros was represented by three athletes who competed across two sports. Amed Elna and Fadane Hamadi served as the country's flag bearers during the opening ceremony and Hamadi carried the flag during the closing ceremony. The nation did not win any medals at the Games.

== Background ==
The National Olympic Committee (Comité Olympique et Sportif des Iles Comores) of Comoros was formed in 1979 and was approved by the International Olympic Committee (IOC) in 1993. The 1996 Summer Olympics marked Comoros's first participation as an independent nation in the Olympic Games. After the nation made its debut in the Summer Olympics at the 1996 Games, it competed in every Summer Olympics and this edition of the Games in 2020.

== Competitors ==
Comoros was represented by three athletes who competed across two sports.

Sport	Men	Women	Total
Athletics	1	1	2
Judo	1	0	1
Total	2	1	3

== Athletics ==
As per the governing body World Athletics (WA), a NOC was allowed to enter up to three qualified athletes in each individual event and one qualified relay team if the Olympic Qualifying Standards (OQS) for the respective events had been met during the qualifying period. The remaining places were allocated based on the World Athletics Rankings which were derived from the average of the best five results for an athlete over the designated qualifying period, weighted by the importance of the meet.

Comoros received the universality slots from the World Athletics to send two athletes (one male and one female) to the Olympics. Fadane Hamadi, who competed in his first Olympics, did not make it out of the initial heats in the Men's 110 m hurdles. Amed Elna, who studied law at Sorbonne University in France, made her Olympics debut in the 100 metres. She finished eighth in the first preliminary heat running a time of 14.30, which was a new personal best. However, she did not progress to the next round.

Key

- Note–Ranks given for track events are within the athlete's heat only
- Q = Qualified for the next round
- q = Qualified for the next round as a fastest loser or, in field events, by position without achieving the qualifying target
- NR = National record
- N/A = Round not applicable for the event
- Bye = Athlete not required to compete in round

Track & road events

Athlete	Event	Heat		Quarterfinal		Semifinal		Final	
Athlete	Event	Result	Rank	Result	Rank	Result	Rank	Result	Rank
Fadane Hamadi	Men's 110 m hurdles	14.99	8	—N/a		Did not advance			
Amed Elna	Women's 100 m	14.30	9	Did not advance					

== Judo ==
Each NOC could enter a maximum of 14 judokas for the event with one in each weight division. The qualification was determined by the world ranking list prepared by International Judo Federation (IJF) as on 28 June 2021. The top 18 were awarded straight quotas apart from continental quotas that were awarded by IJF. Comoros received an invitation from the Tripartite Commission and the International Judo Federation to send Housni Thaobani in the men's half-middleweight category (81 kg), marking the country's Olympic debut in the sport.

The main event was held at the Nippon Budokan. Thaoubani competed against Robin Pacek of Sweden in the round of 32. He lost the bout after the opponent scored an ippon and was eliminated from the competition.

Athlete	Event	Round of 64	Round of 32	Round of 16	Quarterfinals	Semifinals	Repechage	Final / BM	
Athlete	Event	Opposition Result	Opposition Result	Opposition Result	Opposition Result	Opposition Result	Opposition Result	Opposition Result	Rank
Housni Thaoubani	Men's –81 kg	Pacek (SWE); L 00–10	Did not advance						
