= Maoulida Darouèche =

Comoran hurdler and javelin thrower

Personal information
- Nationality: Comoran
- Born: 7 February 1990 (age 36)
- Height: 1.77 m (5 ft 10 in) (2016)
- Weight: 60 kg (132 lb) (2016)

Sport
- Sport: Track and field
- Event: 400 metres hurdles

Achievements and titles
- Personal best(s): 400 metres hurdles: 51.79; Javelin: 53.97

Maoulida Darouèche (born 7 February 1990) is a Comoran hurdler who specialises in the 400 metres hurdles and who has also competed in the javelin throw. Darouèche competed in the 2012 Summer Olympics and the 2016 Summer Olympics. At both Olympics he competed in the 400 metres hurdles. He has also competed in two World Championships, an African athletics championships and a Jeux de la Francophonie.

== Competition ==
Darouèche's debut at an international athletics competition was at the 2012 Summer Olympics, where he competed in the 400 metres hurdles. He was drawn in heat four, a heat containing eventual bronze medalist Javier Culson. Darouèche ran a time of 53.49 seconds and finished last in his heat. Darouèche ran the slowest time of any athlete in the heat round, although Lankantien Lamboni, Akihiko Nakamura and Takayuki Kishimoto were disqualified. Darouèche was 3.36 seconds slower than the slowest athlete to progress to the semi-final round and, therefore, he was eliminated.

He then competed at the 2013 World Championships in Athletics in the 400 metres hurdles. Darouèche raced in heat two and ran a time of 53.28 seconds. He was 3.41 seconds slower than the heat winner, Omar Cisneros of Cuba. Darouèche's time was the slowest by any athlete in the heat round of the competition. With only 24 athletes progressing to the semi-finals, 35th fastest Darouèche was eliminated. Darouèche competed at the 2013 Jeux de la Francophonie in September 2013 and was knocked out of the 400 metres hurdles in the heat round after his time of 53.75 seconds was not quick enough to qualify for the final. He was the second-slowest athlete in the heat round, beating Ali Hazer of Lebanon by 0.98 seconds.

Darouèche's next major competition was the 2014 African Championships in Athletics. He was disqualified from the 400 metres hurdles due to violating IAAF rule 168.7(a) which states an athlete shall be disqualified if his foot or leg is, at the instant of clearance, beside the hurdle (on either side) or below the horizontal plane of the top of the hurdle. The 2015 World Championships in Athletics was Darouèche's second World Championships. He recorded the slowest time out of any athlete in the heat round of the 400 metres hurdles with a time of 53.06 seconds. At the 2016 Summer Olympics, Darouèche competed in the 400 metres hurdles. Darouèche was drawn in heat two, a heat containing eventual bronze medalist Yasmani Copello. In the race on 15 August 2016, Darouèche ran a time of 52.32 seconds. Darouèche's time was the 45th-quickest out of 46 finishers with only Bahamian Jeffery Gibson slower. Darouèche's time was 2.55 seconds slower than the slowest athlete to progress to the nest round and, therefore, he was eliminated.

In his career, Darouèche has also competed in the javelin. His personal best in the event is 53.97 metres which he set in Miramas, France.

== Personal life ==
Darouèche moved to France at age 15 as an exchange student. As of 2016, he lives in Salon-de-Provence.

Olympic Games
| Preceded by Feta Ahamada | Flagbearer for Comoros; 2016 Rio de Janeiro | Succeeded by Amed Elna Fadane Hamadi |
