= Feta Ahamada =

French-Comorian sprinter

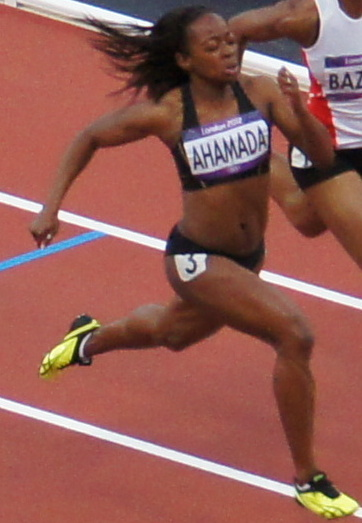
- Feta Ahamada competing at the 2012 Summer Olympics in London

Personal information
- Nationality: Comorian/French
- Born: 24 June 1987 (age 39) Clichy-la-Garenne, France

Sport
- Country: Comoros
- Sport: Track and field sprinting
Medal record
Indian Ocean Island Games
Gold medal – first place	2007 Antananarivo	100 m hurdles
Silver medal – second place	2007 Antananarivo	100 m
Silver medal – second place	2011 Victoria	100 m hurdles
- Updated on 28 October 2016

Feta Ahamada (born 24 June 1987) is a track and field sprint athlete who competes internationally for Comoros. She has competed at both the 2008 Summer Olympics in Beijing, China, and at the 2012 Games in London, United Kingdom.

== Athletics ==
She holds a personal best over the 100 metres of 11.59 seconds. Competing at the 2011 IAAF World Championships in Athletics, held in Daegu, South Korea, Ahamada represented her nation on 27 August in the preliminary round. She came second in the second heat, with a time of 12.27 seconds, behind Cameroon's Delphine Atangana. In the sixth heat of the quarterfinals on 28 August, she finished in a time of 12.22 seconds, in seventh place. This was 1.1 seconds slower than the heat's winner, Myriam Soumaré of France.

=== Olympics ===
Ahamada represented Comoros at the 2008 Summer Olympics in Beijing, China. She competed at the 100 metres and placed sixth in her heat without advancing to the second round. She ran the distance in a time of 11.88 seconds, some 0.55 seconds behind the winner, Ivet Lalova of Bulgaria. However, she was ahead of Gambia's Fatou Tiyana (12.25 seconds) and Beauty Nazum Nahar from Bangladesh (12.52 seconds).

She appeared in a photographic exhibition of Arabic women in sport in London, United Kingdom, shortly prior to the 2012 Summer Olympics in the same city. She said when discussing her exhibit, "If covering your body or your hair makes you feel comfortable, it's not a handicap, it's only sport. Everyone should do want they want." At the London Games, she won her heat of the women's 100 metres in a time of 11.81 seconds on 3 August. In the quarterfinals, on the same day, Ahamada was eliminated after posting a time of 11.86 seconds and finishing in seventh position.

== Notes ==
Olympic Games
Preceded by Mhadjou Youssouf	Flagbearer for Comoros; 2012 London	Succeeded by Maoulida Darouèche
