= Hachim Maaroufou =

French-Comorian sprinter

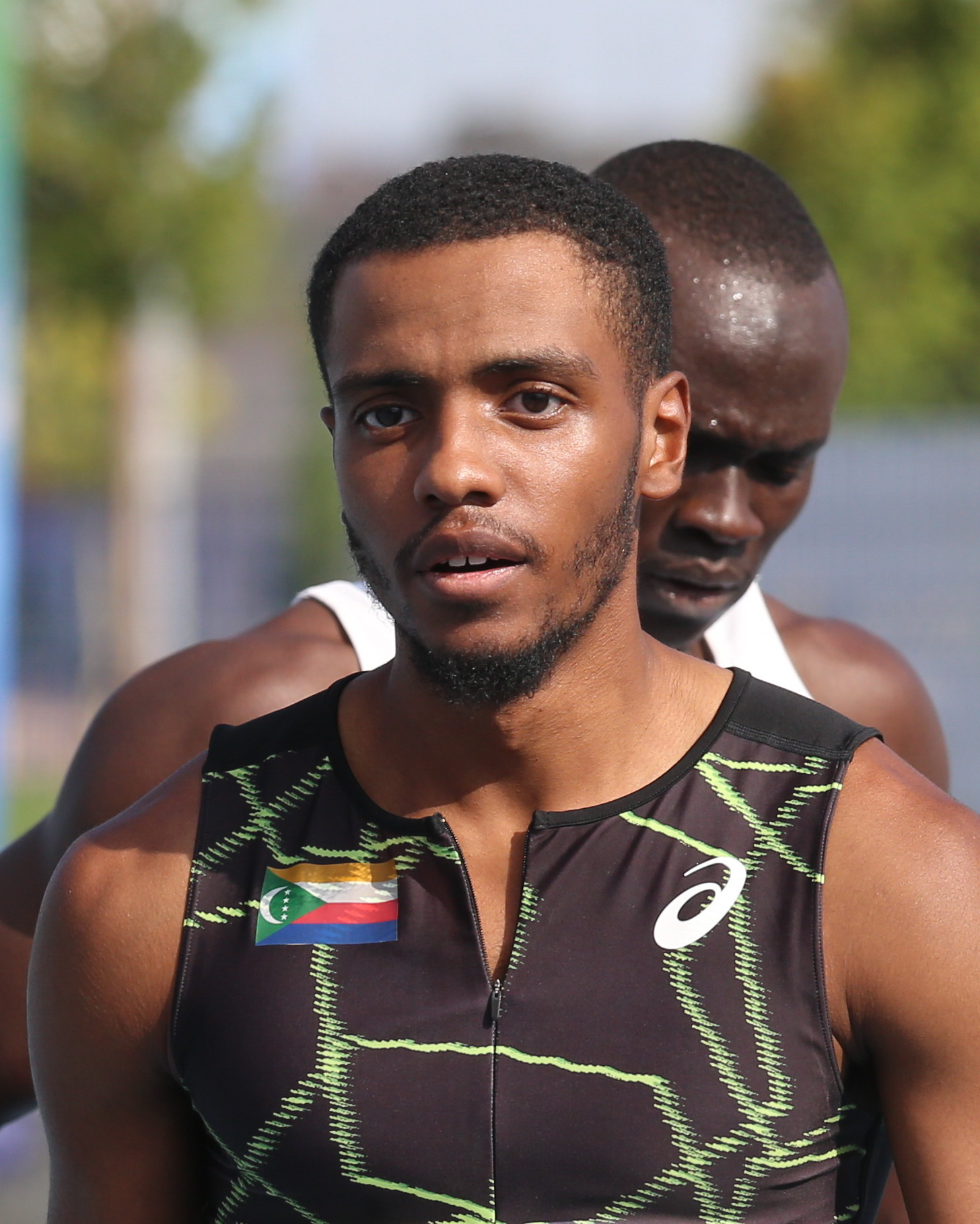
- Maaroufou in 2021

Personal information
- Born: 13 February 1997 (age 29) Marseille, France
- Height: 1.83 m (6 ft 0 in)

Sport
- Sport: Athletics
- Events: 100 metres; 200 metres; 400 metres

Achievements and titles
- Personal bests: 100m: 10.31 (2024); 200m: 20.52 (2022); 400m: 49.35 (2019)

Hachim Maaroufou (born 13 February 1997) is a sprinter, who represents Comoros. He competed in the men's 100 metres event at the 2024 Summer Olympics.

He was the flagbearer for Comoros at the 2024 Summer Olympics.
