= Olympic and Sports Committee of the Comoros =

National Olympic Committee

- Country: Comoros
- [[|]]
- Code: COM
- Recognized: 1993
- Continental Association: ANOCA
- Headquarters: Moroni, Comoros
- President: Ibrahim Mze Mohamed
- Secretary General: Madiane Mohamed Issa
- Website: cosic-km.org

The Olympic and Sports Committee of the Comoros (French: Comité Olympique et Sportif des Iles Comores) (IOC code: COM) is the National Olympic Committee representing Comoros.

== See also ==
- Comoros at the Olympics
