= 2012 African Championships in Athletics – Men's 100 metres =

The men's 100 metres at the 2012 African Championships in Athletics was held at the Stade Charles de Gaulle on 27 and 28 June.

== Medalists ==
Gold	Simon Magakwe; South Africa
Silver	Amr Ibrahim Mostafa Seoud; Egypt
Bronze	Hua Wilfried Koffi; Ivory Coast

== Records ==
Standing records prior to the 2012 African Championships in Athletics
World record	Usain Bolt (JAM)	9.58	Berlin, Germany	16 August 2009
African record	Olusoji Fasuba (NGR)	9.85	Doha, Qatar	12 May 2006
Championship record	Seun Ogunkoya (NGR)	9.94	Dakar, Senegal	19 August 1998

== Schedule ==
Date	Time	Round
27 June 2012	13:10	Round 1
28 June 2012	13:15	Semifinals
28 June 2012	15:15	Final

== Results ==
=== Round 1 ===
First 2 in each heat (Q) and 8 best performers (q) advance to the Semifinals.

Wind:
Heat 1: -0.7 m/s, Heat 2: -2.1 m/s, Heat 3: -4.7 m/s, Heat 4: -2.6 m/s, Heat 5: -2.9 m/s, Heat 6: -1.6 m/s, Heat 7 -2.0 m/s, Heat 8: -1.4 m/s

Rank	Heat	Lane	Name	Nationality	Time	Note
1	4	3	Abdourahim Haroun	Chad	10.28	Q
2	1	3	Simon Magakwe	South Africa	10.39	Q
2	3	7	Hua Wilfried Koffi	Ivory Coast	10.39	Q
4	7	3	Suwaibou Sanneh	Gambia	10.43	Q
5	1	2	Tim Abeyie	Ghana	10.45	Q
5	7	4	Amr Ibrahim Mostafa Seoud	Egypt	10.45	Q
7	4	4	Stanley Azie	Nigeria	10.54	Q
8	3	3	Innocent Bologo	Burkina Faso	10.55	Q
8	1	1	Béranger Aymard Bosse	Central African Republic	10.55	q
10	2	5	Egwero Ogho-Oghene	Nigeria	10.57	Q
10	2	6	Gérard Kobéané	Burkina Faso	10.57	Q
10	5	5	Mosito Lehata	Lesotho	10.57	Q
13	4	1	Roscoe Engel	South Africa	10.59	q
14	3	6	Ibrahim Muiya	Kenya	10.61	q
15	5	2	Ashhad Agyapong	Ghana	10.63	Q
15	1	4	Fabrice Coiffic	Mauritius	10.63	q
17	1	8	Yateya Kambepela	Botswana	10.67	q
18	8	8	Hitjivirue Kaanjuka	Namibia	10.69	Q
18	4	2	Titus Kafunda Mukhala	Zambia	10.69	q
18	7	8	Gogbeu Francis Koné	Ivory Coast	10.69	q
21	4	7	Adama Jammeh	Gambia	10.70	q
22	2	3	Idrissa Adam	Cameroon	10.71	
23	8	7	Fiacre Brisso Bahorou	Benin	10.75	Q
24	7	7	Pierre Paul Bissek	Cameroon	10.77	
25	6	2	Obinna Metu	Nigeria	10.78	Q
26	6	3	Allah Laryea-Akrong	Ghana	10.82	Q
26	1	7	Holder da Silva	Guinea-Bissau	10.82	
28	8	6	Francis Zimwara	Zimbabwe	10.83	
29	2	2	Delivert Arsene Kimbembe	Republic of the Congo	10.89	
30	7	1	Sibusiso Matsenjwa	Swaziland	10.91	
31	3	8	Adam Yarou	Benin	10.96	
32	5	7	Yendountien Tiebekabe	Togo	10.98	
33	2	4	Abyot Lencho	Ethiopia	11.00	
34	2	8	Mustapha Manga	Gambia	11.05	
35	8	4	Jean-Yves Esparon	Seychelles	11.06	
36	3	4	Danny D'Souza	Seychelles	11.07	
37	5	4	Thierie Ferdinand	Mauritius	11.10	
37	7	2	Wetere Galcha	Ethiopia	11.10	
39	8	3	Mooketsi Magaga	Botswana	11.15	
40	8	5	Jean Tarcicius Batambok	Cameroon	11.16	
41	4	8	Alebachew Deriso Getahun	Ethiopia	11.19	
42	5	8	Lester Dogley	Seychelles	11.25	
43	1	6	Mohamed Dowha	Libya	11.30	
44	7	5	Alexandre Osvaldo	Angola	11.34	
45	3	5	Tondi Ide Adamou	Niger	11.35	
45	4	6	Coulibaly Sounkhasso	Mali	11.35	
47	4	5	Antimo Oyono	Equatorial Guinea	11.50	
48	3	2	Hassan Arreh Farhan	Djibouti	11.87	
49	7	6	Hannes Dreyer	South Africa	12.26	
	6	6	Ben Youssef Meité	Ivory Coast	DSQ	
	6	5	Tony Chirchir	Kenya	DSQ	
	6	8	Fanuel Kenosi	Botswana	DSQ	
	1	5	Brian Dzingai	Zimbabwe	DNS	
	2	7	Touray Ibrahim	Sierra Leone	DNS	
	3	1	Richard Chitambi	Zambia	DNS	
	5	6	Marvini Bonde	Zimbabwe	DNS	
	6	4	Tekle Berhane	Eritrea	DNS	
	6	7	Sounkhaso Coulibaly	Mali	DNS	
	8	2	Shepherd Kofi Agbeko	Ghana	DNS	

=== Semifinals ===
First 2 in each heat (Q) and 2 best performers (q) advance to the Final.

Wind:
Heat 1: -0.8 m/s, Heat 2: -1.0 m/s, Heat 3: -0.2 m/s

Rank	Heat	Lane	Name	Nationality	Time	Note
1	1	6	Hua Wilfried Koffi	Ivory Coast	10.31	Q
2	1	4	Suwaibou Sanneh	Gambia	10.40	Q
2	2	3	Amr Ibrahim Mostafa Seoud	Egypt	10.40	Q
2	3	6	Mosito Lehata	Lesotho	10.40	Q
5	3	3	Stanley Azie	Nigeria	10.41	Q
6	2	5	Egwero Ogho-Oghene	Nigeria	10.43	Q
7	1	3	Obinna Metu	Nigeria	10.45	q
8	2	6	Simon Magakwe	South Africa	10.46	q
9	3	1	Ibrahim Muiya	Kenya	10.54	
10	1	5	Tim Abeyie	Ghana	10.55	
11	2	4	Innocent Bologo	Burkina Faso	10.56	
11	3	7	Gérard Kobéané	Burkina Faso	10.56	
13	3	8	Allah Laryea-Akrong	Ghana	10.57	
14	1	7	Roscoe Engel	South Africa	10.61	
15	2	2	Gogbeu Francis Koné	Ivory Coast	10.61	
16	1	1	Titus Kafunda Mukhala	Zambia	10.65	
16	3	2	Adama Jammeh	Gambia	10.65	
18	3	5	Hitjivirue Kaanjuka	Namibia	10.66	
19	2	8	Béranger Aymard Bosse	Central African Republic	10.70	
20	2	7	Ashhad Agyapong	Ghana	10.72	
21	1	8	Fiacre Brisso Bahorou	Benin	10.73	
22	2	1	Fabrice Coiffic	Mauritius	10.77	
23	3	4	Abdourahim Haroun	Chad	10.84	
	1	2	Yateya Kambepela	Botswana	DNS	

=== Final ===
Wind: -0.9 m/s

Rank	Lane	Name	Nationality	Time	Note
1st place, gold medalist(s)	1	Simon Magakwe	South Africa	10.29	
2nd place, silver medalist(s)	6	Amr Ibrahim Mostafa Seoud	Egypt	10.34	
3rd place, bronze medalist(s)	3	Hua Wilfried Koffi	Ivory Coast	10.37	
4	4	Suwaibou Sanneh	Gambia	10.39	
5	5	Mosito Lehata	Lesotho	10.40	
5	2	Obinna Metu	Nigeria	10.40	
7	7	Egwero Ogho-Oghene	Nigeria	10.47	
8	8	Stanley Azie	Nigeria	10.58	
