= Athletics at the 2007 All-Africa Games – Men's 4 × 100 metres relay =

The men's 4 x 100 metres relay at the 2007 All-Africa Games was held on July 19–20.

== Medalists ==
Gold	Silver	Bronze
Nigeria; Isaac Uche; Obinna Metu; Chinedu Oriala; Olusoji Fasuba	South Africa; Morné Nagel; Leigh Julius; Lee Roy Newton; Sherwin Vries	Zimbabwe; Ngonidzashe Makusha; Gabriel Mvumvure; Brian Dzingai; Lewis Banda

== Results ==
=== Heats ===
Qualification: First 3 teams of each heat (Q) plus the next 2 fastest (q) qualified for the final.

Rank	Heat	Nation	Athletes	Time	Notes
1	1	Nigeria	Isaac Uche, Obinna Metu, Chinedu Oriala, Olusoji Fasuba	39.07	Q
2	1	Zimbabwe	Ngonidzashe Makusha, Gabriel Mvumvure, Brian Dzingai, Lewis Banda	39.33	Q, NR
3	2	Ghana	Harry Adu-Mfum, Samuel Adade, Seth Amoo, Eric Nkansah	39.49	Q
4	1	Ivory Coast	Jonathan Williams, Marius Loua Siapade, Ben Youssef Meité, Éric Pacôme N'Dri	39.54	Q
4	2	South Africa	Morné Nagel, Leigh Julius, Lee Roy Newton, Sherwin Vries	39.54	Q
6	2	Mauritius	Arnaud Casquette, Fernando Augustin, Ommanandsing Kowlessur, Fabrice Coiffic	39.92	Q
7	2	Botswana	Justice Malabi, Samuel Kenosi, Tlhalosang Molapisi, Obakeng Ngwigwa	39.93	q, NR
8	1	Burkina Faso	Thierry Adanabou, Siaka Son, Apollinaire Gnima, Idrissa Sanou	40.56	q
9	1	Ethiopia	Zemenu Kassa, Mohammed-jud Misbah, Abiyote Lencho, Wetere Galcha	41.11	NR
10	1	Gambia	Abdoulie Asim, Modou Njie, Omar Ceesay, Suwaibou Sanneh	41.61	
	1	Senegal		DNF	
	2	Guinea		DNS	
	2	Cameroon		DNS	

=== Final ===
Rank	Nation	Athletes	Time	Notes
1st place, gold medalist(s)	Nigeria	Isaac Uche, Obinna Metu, Chinedu Oriala, Olusoji Fasuba	38.91	
2nd place, silver medalist(s)	South Africa	Morné Nagel, Leigh Julius, Lee Roy Newton, Sherwin Vries	39.11	
3rd place, bronze medalist(s)	Zimbabwe	Ngonidzashe Makusha, Gabriel Mvumvure, Brian Dzingai, Lewis Banda	39.16	NR
4	Ghana	Harry Adu-Mfum, Samuel Adade, Seth Amoo, Eric Nkansah	39.59	
5	Mauritius	Arnaud Casquette, Fernando Augustin, Ommanandsing Kowlessur, Fabrice Coiffic	39.64	
6	Botswana	Justice Malabi, Samuel Kenosi, Tlhalosang Molapisi, Obakeng Ngwigwa	40.07	
7	Burkina Faso	Thierry Adanabou, Siaka Son, Apollinaire Gnima, Idrissa Sanou	40.17	NR
	Ivory Coast	Jonathan Williams, Marius Loua Siapade, Ben Youssef Meité, Éric Pacôme N'Dri	DQ	
