= Athletics at the 2007 All-Africa Games – Men's 200 metres =

The men's 200 metres at the 2007 All-Africa Games were held on July 21–22.

== Medalists ==
Gold	Silver	Bronze
Leigh Julius; South Africa	Seth Amoo; Ghana	Obinna Metu; Nigeria

== Results ==
=== Heats ===
Qualification: First 2 of each heat (Q) and the next 8 fastest (q) qualified for the semifinals.

Wind:
Heat 1: -0.8 m/s, Heat 2: +0.5 m/s, Heat 3: -0.6 m/s, Heat 4: +0.8 m/s, Heat 5: +0.7 m/s, Heat 6: +0.7 m/s, Heat 7: +0.5 m/s, Heat 8: +1.8 m/s

Rank	Heat	Name	Nationality	Time	Notes
1	3	Obinna Metu	Nigeria	20.63	Q, PB
2	1	Seth Amoo	Ghana	20.87	Q
3	6	Gibrilla Patu Bangura	Sierra Leone	20.91	Q, PB
4	6	Brian Dzingai	Zimbabwe	20.95	Q
5	3	Oumar Loum	Senegal	20.96	Q, SB
6	3	Gabriel Mvumvure	Zimbabwe	21.11	q
6	8	Leigh Julius	South Africa	21.11	Q
8	1	Amr Ibrahim Mostafa Seoud	Egypt	21.14	Q
8	5	Fanuel Kenosi	Botswana	21.14	Q, PB
10	6	Fabrice Coiffic	Mauritius	21.16	q
11	1	Ben Youssef Meité	Ivory Coast	21.20	q, =SB
11	8	Wilfried Bingangoye	Gabon	21.20	Q
13	5	Chinedu Oriala	Nigeria	21.26	Q
14	4	Mohamed Mosbah	Libya	21.30	Q, NR
15	5	Béranger Bosse	Central African Republic	21.40	q
16	2	Marius Loua Siapade	Ivory Coast	21.42	Q
17	8	Holder da Silva	Guinea-Bissau	21.44	q, NJR
18	6	Narcisse Tevoedjre	Benin	21.47	q
19	7	Kagiso Kumbane	South Africa	21.50	Q
20	6	Justice Malabi	Botswana	21.52	q
21	3	Ommanandsingh Kowlessur	Mauritius	21.53	q, SB
22	4	Siaka Son	Burkina Faso	21.56	Q, PB
23	4	Abdourahmane Ndour	Senegal	21.57	SB
23	4	Suwaibou Sanneh	Gambia	21.63	PB
24	1	Hitjivirue Kaanjuka	Namibia	21.64	
25	2	Samuel Adade	Ghana	21.70	Q
26	2	Kaba Diakite Bemba	Senegal	21.70	PB
27	2	Antony Hobwana	Zimbabwe	21.72	PB
28	8	Mohammed-jud Misbah	Ethiopia	21.77	PB
29	3	Aboubakar Tawerghi	Libya	21.79	SB
29	2	Moussa Sissoko	Mali	21.87	
30	8	Samuel Egadu	Uganda	21.94	PB
31	7	Cyril Ferguson	Ghana	22.00	Q, PB
32	2	Wetere Galcha	Ethiopia	22.01	SB
33	1	Berthe Rafan	Mali	22.03	PB
34	1	Fayçal Cherifi	Algeria	22.04	PB
35	8	Anthony Weah	Liberia	22.10	PB
36	8	Youssouf Mahjdoub	Comoros	22.11	PB
36	6	Nicolau Palanca	Angola	22.14	PB
37	3	Dazi Kouassi	Ivory Coast	22.17	PB
38	2	Modou Njie	Gambia	22.22	PB
39	7	Ramadhini Ngaruko	Burundi	22.29	
40	3	Almany Bangoura	Guinea	22.34	
41	1	Oumar Bella Bah	Guinea	22.36	
42	7	Ibrahim Niankara	Burkina Faso	22.46	
43	6	Roberts Kokurlo	Liberia	22.48	
44	7	Mohamed Konate	Mauritania	22.59	
45	7	Islam Mulinda	Rwanda	22.77	
46	4	Zemenu Kassa	Ethiopia	22.90	PB
47	2	Gebremicael Ermias Tesfu	Eritrea	22.93	
48	5	Matuco Nzovo	Angola	22.95	
49	3	Mofo Tshihinga	Democratic Republic of the Congo	23.15	
	1	Nagmeldin Ali Abubakr	Sudan	DNF	
	4	Roger Angouno Moke	Republic of the Congo	DNS	
	4	Stephen Odwar	Uganda	DNS	
	5	Tidiane Coulibaly	Mali	DNS	
	5	Mounir Mahadi	Chad	DNS	
	5	Morne Nagel	South Africa	DNS	
	7	Uchenna Emedolu	Nigeria	DNS	

=== Semifinals ===
Qualification: First 2 of each semifinal (Q) and the next 2 fastest (q) qualified for the final.

Wind:
Heat 1: -0.4 m/s, Heat 2: 0.0 m/s, Heat 3: +1.2 m/s

Rank	Heat	Name	Nationality	Time	Notes
1	2	Obinna Metu	Nigeria	20.66	Q
2	3	Seth Amoo	Ghana	20.72	Q, SB
3	1	Leigh Julius	South Africa	20.81	Q
4	3	Amr Ibrahim Mostafa Seoud	Egypt	20.83	Q, NR
5	3	Gabriel Mvumvure	Zimbabwe	20.91	q, NJR
6	1	Oumar Loum	Senegal	21.00	Q
7	1	Gibrilla Patu Bangura	Sierra Leone	21.15	q
7	3	Fanuel Kenosi	Botswana	21.15	
9	3	Fabrice Coiffic	Mauritius	21.16	
10	3	Ben Youssef Meité	Ivory Coast	21.18	SB
11	2	Wilfried Bingangoye	Gabon	21.25	Q
12	3	Kagiso Kumbane	South Africa	21.27	
13	3	Narcisse Tevoedjre	Benin	21.42	SB
14	1	Samuel Adade	Ghana	21.43	
15	2	Mohamed Mosbah	Libya	21.46	
16	2	Marius Loua	Ivory Coast	21.57	
17	1	Holder da Silva	Guinea-Bissau	21.62	
18	2	Béranger Bosse	Central African Republic	21.74	
19	2	Siaka Son	Burkina Faso	21.80	
20	2	Ommanandsingh Kowlessur	Mauritius	21.91	
21	1	Justice Malabi	Botswana	22.21	
	1	Brian Dzingai	Zimbabwe	DNS	
	1	Chinedu Oriala	Nigeria	DNS	
	2	Cyril Ferguson	Ghana	DNS	

=== Final ===
Wind: -0.7 m/s

Rank	Name	Nationality	Time	Notes
1st place, gold medalist(s)	Leigh Julius	South Africa	20.81	
2nd place, silver medalist(s)	Seth Amoo	Ghana	20.88	
3rd place, bronze medalist(s)	Obinna Metu	Nigeria	20.94	
4	Amr Ibrahim Mostafa Seoud	Egypt	21.07	
5	Gibrilla Patu Bangura	Sierra Leone	21.08	
6	Gabriel Mvumvure	Zimbabwe	21.22	
7	Wilfried Bingangoye	Gabon	21.49	
8	Oumar Loum	Senegal	21.77	
