= 2006 African Championships in Athletics – Men's 100 metres =

100 meter race in Africa in 2006

The men's 100 metres event at the 2006 African Championships in Athletics was held at the Stade Germain Comarmond on August 9–10.

== Medalists ==
Gold	Silver	Bronze
Olusoji Fasuba; Nigeria	Uchenna Emedolu; Nigeria	Eric Nkansah; Ghana

== Results ==
=== Heats ===
Wind: Heat 1: -2.9 m/s, Heat 2: -2.5 m/s, Heat 3: -3.0 m/s, Heat 4: -1.7 m/s

Rank	Heat	Name	Nationality	Time	Notes
1	1	Uchenna Emedolu	Nigeria	10.66	Q
2	1	Béranger Aymard Bosse	Central African Republic	10.68	Q
3	1	Enrico Louis	Mauritius	10.70	Q
4	2	Hannes Dreyer	South Africa	10.72	Q
5	2	Amr Ibrahim Mostafa Seoud	Egypt	10.72	Q
6	2	Harry Adu-Mfum	Ghana	10.76	Q
7	2	Idrissa Sanou	Burkina Faso	10.83	q
8	1	Mouhamadou Lamine Niang	Senegal	10.88	q
9	4	Eric Nkansah	Ghana	10.89	Q
10	4	Sherwin Vries	South Africa	10.93	Q
11	3	Moussa Baldé	Senegal	11.04	Q
12	3	Olusoji Fasuba	Nigeria	11.06	Q
13	1	Ben Youssef Meité	Ivory Coast	11.07	q
14	3	Tidiane Coulibaly	Mali	11.11	Q
15	1	Wetere Galcha	Ethiopia	11.12	q
16	1	Thierry Adanabou	Burkina Faso	11.15	
17	3	Jack Ng'umbi	Zambia	11.18	
18	3	Ahmed Ondimba Bongo	Mauritius	11.20	
18	4	Yves Sonan	Ivory Coast	11.20	Q
20	3	Wilfried Bingangoye	Gabon	11.27	
21	4	Devilert Arsene Kimbembe	Republic of the Congo	11.32	
22	4	Benedictus Botha	Namibia	11.35	
23	2	Richard Chitambi	Zambia	11.41	
24	1	Tlhalosang Molapisi	Botswana	11.43	
25	3	Islam Mulinda	Rwanda	11.48	
26	2	Danny D'Souza	Seychelles	11.58	
27	4	Moise Kossi	Central African Republic	11.68	
28	2	Assoumani Ahmed	Comoros	11.78	
29	4	Souhalia Alamou	Benin	35.04	
	2	Chinedu Oriala	Nigeria	DNS	
	3	Éric Pacôme N'Dri	Ivory Coast	DNS	
	4	Yahya Berrabah	Morocco	DNS	

=== Semifinals ===
Wind: Heat 1: -2.5 m/s, Heat 2: -1.7 m/s

Rank	Heat	Name	Nationality	Time	Notes
1	2	Eric Nkansah	Ghana	10.63	Q
2	1	Uchenna Emedolu	Nigeria	10.70	Q
2	2	Amr Ibrahim Mostafa Seoud	Egypt	10.70	Q
4	1	Olusoji Fasuba	Nigeria	10.71	Q
5	2	Sherwin Vries	South Africa	10.75	Q
6	1	Idrissa Sanou	Burkina Faso	10.81	Q
6	2	Hannes Dreyer	South Africa	10.81	Q
6	2	Harry Adu-Mfum	Ghana	10.81	
9	1	Béranger Aymard Bosse	Central African Republic	10.83	Q
10	2	Mouhamadou Lamine Niang	Senegal	10.87	
11	1	Enrico Louis	Mauritius	10.94	
12	2	Tidiane Coulibaly	Mali	10.96	
13	1	Moussa Baldé	Senegal	11.00	
14	1	Yves Sonan	Ivory Coast	11.22	
	2	Ben Youssef Meité	Ivory Coast	DNF	
	1	Wetere Galcha	Ethiopia	DQ	

=== Final ===
Wind: -2.9 m/s

Rank	Lane	Name	Nationality	Time	Notes
1st place, gold medalist(s)	6	Olusoji Fasuba	Nigeria	10.37	
2nd place, silver medalist(s)	5	Uchenna Emedolu	Nigeria	10.44	
3rd place, bronze medalist(s)	4	Eric Nkansah	Ghana	10.65	
4	2	Hannes Dreyer	South Africa	10.74	
5	7	Béranger Aymard Bosse	Central African Republic	10.80	
6	3	Amr Ibrahim Mostafa Seoud	Egypt	10.81	
7	1	Idrissa Sanou	Burkina Faso	10.86	
	8	Sherwin Vries	South Africa	DQ	
