= 2012 African Championships in Athletics – Men's 4 × 100 metres relay =

The men's 4 x 100 metres relay at the 2012 African Championships in Athletics was held at the Stade Charles de Gaulle on 28 and 29 June.

== Medalists ==
Gold	Hannes Dreyer, Simon Magakwe; Roscoe Engel, Thuso Mpuang; South Africa
Silver	Peter Emelieze, Obinna Metu; Adetoyi Durotoye, Ogho-Oghene Egwero; Nigeria
Bronze	Emmanuel Kubi, Tim Abeyie; Ashhad Agyapong, Allah Laryea-Akrong; Ghana

== Records ==
Standing records prior to the 2012 African Championships in Athletics
World record	Jamaica; Nesta Carter, Michael Frater; Yohan Blake, Usain Bolt	37.04	Daegu, South Korea	4 September 2011
African record	Nigeria; Osmond Ezinwa, Olapade Adeniken; Francis Obikwelu, Davidson Ezinwa	37.94	Athens, Greece	9 August 1997
Championship record	South Africa; Hannes Dreyer, Corne Du Plessis; Sergio Mullins, Thuso Mpuang	38.75	Addis Ababa, Ethiopia	2 May 2008

== Schedule ==
Date	Time	Round
28 June 2012	17:35	Round 1
29 June 2012	17:50	Final

== Results ==
=== Round 1 ===
First 3 in each heat (Q) and 2 best performers (q) advance to the Final.

Rank	Heat	Lane	Nation	Athletes	Time	Notes
1	1	6	Ghana	Emmanuel Kubi, Tim Abeyie, Ashhad Agyapong, Allah Laryea-Akrong	39.38	Q
2	1	5	South Africa	Ruan de Vries, Simon Magakwe, Roscoe Engel, Thuso Mpuang	39.47	Q
3	1	7	Nigeria	Peter Emelieze, Obinna Metu, Adetoyi Durotoye, Chinedu Patrick Ike	39.48	Q
4	2	3	Benin	Fiacre Brisso Bahorou, Wilcox Ernest Bamd Makou, Josias Mevognon, Inoussa Kassim	40.19	Q
5	1	4	Cameroon	Jean Tarcicius Batambok, François Belinga, Pierre Paul Bissek, Idrissa Adam	40.24	q
6	2	4	Ivory Coast	Siapade Marius Loua, Hua Wilfried Koffi, Ben Youssef Meité, Gogbeu Francis Koné	40.27	Q
7	1	3	Gambia	Isaac Jones, Adama Jammeh, Assim Abdoule, Suwaibou Sanneh	40.42	q, NR
8	2	5	Botswana	Tiroyaone Masaile, Mooketsi Magaga, Fanuel Kenosi, Yateya Kambepela	40.51	Q
9	2	7	Seychelles	Jean-Yves Esparon, Leeroy Henriette, Danny D'Souza, Lester Dogley	41.33	
10	2	6	Ethiopia	Wetere Galcha, Zenebe Medfu, Abyot Lencho, Alebachew Deriso	41.44	
	1	2	Burkina Faso	Innocent Bologo, Idrissa Ganaba, Gérard Kobéané, Ben Bande	DNF	
	1	8	Zimbabwe		DNS	
	2	2	Chad		DNS	

=== Final ===
Rank	Lane	Nation	Athletes	Time	Notes
1st place, gold medalist(s)	4	South Africa	Hannes Dreyer, Simon Magakwe, Roscoe Engel, Thuso Mpuang	39.26	
2nd place, silver medalist(s)	8	Nigeria	Peter Emelieze, Obinna Metu, Adetoyi Durotoye, Ogho-Oghene Egwero	39.34	
3rd place, bronze medalist(s)	6	Ghana	Emmanuel Kubi, Tim Abeyie, Ashhad Agyapong, Allah Laryea-Akrong	39.40	
4	3	Ivory Coast	Gogbeu Francis Koné, Hua Wilfried Koffi, Siapade Marius Loua, Ben Youssef Meité	40.10	
5	2	Cameroon	Jean Tarcicius Batambok, François Belinga, Pierre Paul Bissek, Idrissa Adam	40.16	
6	7	Botswana	Fanuel Kenosi, Obakeng Ngwigwa, Mooketsi Magaga, Tiroyaone Masaile	40.42	
7	5	Benin	Josias Mevognon, Inoussa Kassim, Wilcox Ernest Bamd Makou, Fiacre Brisso Bahorou	40.86	
	1	Gambia	Isaac Jones, Assim Abdoule, Adama Jammeh, Suwaibou Sanneh	DSQ	
