= 2010 African Championships in Athletics – Men's 4 × 100 metres relay =

The men's 4 x 100 metres relay at the 2010 African Championships in Athletics was held on July 29–30.

== Medalists ==
| Gold | Silver | Bronze |
|---|---|---|
| South Africa; Hannes Dreyer; Simon Magakwe; Lehann Fourie; Thuso Mpuang | Nigeria; Fred Agbaje; Benjamin Adukwu; Ogho-Oghene Egwero; Obinna Metu | Ghana; Emmanuel Kubi; Nana Kofi Sanah; Godwin Hukporti; Aziz Zakari |

== Results ==
=== Heats ===
Qualification: First 3 teams of each heat (Q) plus the next 2 fastest (q) qualified for the final.

| Rank | Heat | Nation | Athletes | Time | Notes |
|---|---|---|---|---|---|
| 1 | 1 | South Africa | Hannes Dreyer, Simon Magakwe, Lehann Fourie, Thuso Mpuang | 39.30 | Q |
| 2 | 2 | Nigeria | Fred Agbaje, Benjamin Adukwu, Ogho-Oghene Egwero, Obinna Metu | 39.50 | Q |
| 3 | 2 | Kenya | Simon Kimaru, Anderson Mureta Mutegi, Stephen Barasa, Kipkemoi Soy | 39.54 | Q |
| 4 | 1 | Ghana | Emmanuel Kubi, Nana Kofi Sanah, Godwin Hukporti, Allah Laryca-Arrong | 39.83 | Q |
| 5 | 1 | Mauritius | Fabrice Coiffic, Garick Maureemootoo, Ahmed Ondimba Bongo, Eric Milazar | 40.00 | Q |
| 6 | 2 | Ivory Coast | Gogbeu Francis Kone, Wilfried Koffi Hua, Dazi Conet Theodore Kouassi, Ben Youssef Meité | 40.12 | Q |
| 7 | 2 | Burkina Faso | Innocent Bologo, Gérard Kobéané, Siaka Son, Lanssene Relwende Zongo | 40.25 | q |
| 8 | 1 | Zambia | Jack Ng'umbi, Saviour Kombe, Titus Kafunda, Richard Chitambi | 40.94 | q |
| 9 | 1 | Ethiopia | | 41.17 | |
| 10 | 2 | Seychelles | Yannick Vidot, Mervin Loiseau, Leeroy Henriette, Danny D'Souza | 41.23 | |
| | 2 | Uganda | Martin Achila, Lazarous Inya, Geoffrey Akena, Ali Ngaimoko | DQ | |
| | 2 | Tanzania | Laurent Masatu, Lista Matonya, Musa Mlekwa, Muhidini Yasini | DNF | |
| | 1 | Cameroon | | DNS | |
| | 1 | Chad | | DNS | |

=== Final ===
| Rank | Lane | Nation | Competitors | Time | Notes |
|---|---|---|---|---|---|
| 1st place, gold medalist(s) | 3 | South Africa | Hannes Dreyer, Simon Magakwe, Lehann Fourie, Thuso Mpuang | 39.12 | |
| 2nd place, silver medalist(s) | 6 | Nigeria | Fred Agbaje, Benjamin Adukwu, Ogho-Oghene Egwero, Obinna Metu | 39.22 | |
| 3rd place, bronze medalist(s) | 4 | Ghana | Emmanuel Kubi, Nana Kofi Sanah, Godwin Hukporti, Aziz Zakari | 39.31 | |
| 4 | 5 | Kenya | Simon Kimaru, Anderson Mureta Mutegi, Stephen Barasa, Kipkemoi Soy | 39.40 | NR |
| 5 | 7 | Mauritius | Bastute Brasse, Eric Milazar, Fabrice Coiffic, Garick Maureemootoo | 40.27 | |
| 6 | 8 | Ivory Coast | Siapade Darius Loua, Ben Youssef Meité, Dazi Conet Theodore Kouassi, Wilfried Koffi Hua | 40.77 | |
| 7 | 1 | Zambia | Titus Kafunda, Jack Ng'umbi, Saviour Kombe, Richard Chitambi | 41.22 | |
| | 2 | Burkina Faso | Siaka Son, Lanssene Relwende Zongo, Innocent Bologo, Gérard Kobéané | DQ | |
