= List of Burkinabé records in athletics =

The following are the national records in athletics in Burkina Faso maintained by Burkina Faso's national athletics federation: Fédération Burkinabé d'Athlétisme (FBA).

== Outdoor ==
Key to tables: Awaiting ratification Record not kept by FBA Not ratified or later rescinded by FBA

=== Men ===
Event	Record	Athlete	Date	Meet	Place	Ref.
100 m	10.14 (+1.6 m/s)	Idrissa Sanou	13 July 2002		Saint-Étienne, France	
200 m	20.69 (+1.5 m/s)	Innocent Bologo	25 May 2013	Meeting de l'Amitié	Dakar, Senegal	
400 m	46.66	Bienvenu Sawadogo	18 June 2019	Meeting de Bonneuil-sur-Marne	Bonneuil-sur-Marne, France	
800 m	1:52.1 h	Kondia Ouoba	13 April 1974		Abidjan, Côte d'Ivoire	
1500 m	3:53.15	Jean-Bernard Yaro	12 July 1995		Ouagadougou, Burkina Faso	
3000 m	9:10.10	Moctaré Simporé	9 October 2021		Berlin, Germany	
3000 m	8:53.85	Moctaré Simporé	5 June 2022	Pfingstsportfest - The Berlin Meeting	Berlin, Germany	
5000 m	14:51.8 h	Charles Néboua	15 April 1995		Abidjan, Ivory Coast	
10,000 m	31:31.0 h	Charles Néboua	20 April 1996		Ouagadougou, Burkina Faso	
10 km (road)	33:03	Moctaré Simporé	13 March 2022	5th Berlin Invitational	Berlin, Germany	
Half marathon	1:10:39	Moctaré Simporé	22 August 2021	Berlin Half Marathon	Berlin, Germany	
Marathon	2:34:14	Salifou Guébré	2 February 2014		Bamako, Mali	
Marathon	2:27:20	Moctaré Simporé	25 September 2022	Berlin Marathon	Berlin, Germany	
110 m hurdles	13.90 (+1.5 m/s)	Florian Somé	1 July 2018		Mulhouse, France	
400 m hurdles	49.25	Bienvenu Sawadogo	29 August 2019	African Games	Rabat, Morocco	
3000 m steeplechase	9:25.0 h	Boukary Ouédraogo	25 June 1986		Ouagadougou, Burkina Faso	
High jump	2.22 m	Boubacar Séré	13 August 2006		Bambous, Mauritius	
High jump	2.22 m	Boubacar Séré	27 June 2007		Celle Ligure, Italy	
Pole vault	3.85 m	Alassane Néya	2 May 1993		Ouagadougou, Burkina Faso	
Long jump	8.00 m (−0.3 m/s)	Franck Zio	21 June 1998		Viry-Châtillon, France	
Triple jump	17.82 m (+0.2 m/s)	Hugues Fabrice Zango	6 July 2021	Gyulai István Memorial	Székesfehérvár, Hungary	
Shot put	16.31 m	Thimotée Lengani	29 May 2022		Évreux, France	
Shot put	16.99 m	Thimotée Lengani	23 July 2023		Bondoufle, France	
Discus throw	53.63 m	Sié Fahige Kambou	30 May 2021		Zaria, Nigeria	
Discus throw	58.56 m	Timothée Lengani	1 July 2023		Abbeville, France	
Discus throw	54.28 m	Timothée Lengani	12 May 2024	French Club Championships	Cergy-Pontoise, France	
Hammer throw	20.72 m	Relwendé Kaboré	20 May 2012		Versailles, France	
Javelin throw	61.00 m	Calixte Ouédraogo	30 May 1993		Ouagadougou, Burkina Faso	
Decathlon	6400 pts h	Alassane Néya	31 October – 1 November 1993		Ouagadougou, Burkina Faso	
Decathlon	100m / Long jump / Shot put / High jump / 400m / 110m H / Discus / Pole vault / Javelin / 1500m; 11.3 / 6.70 m / 12.70 m / 1.80 m / 54.2 / 15.7 / 37.60 m / 3.80 m / 48.54 m / 5:06.0					
20 km walk (road)						
50 km walk (road)						
4 × 100 m relay	39.57	Burkina Faso; Siaka Son; Idrissa Sanou; Innocent Bologo; Gérard Kobéané	3 October 2009	Jeux de la Francophonie	Beirut, Lebanon	
4 × 400 m relay	3:13.91	Burkina Faso	14 May 2006		Lomé, Togo	

=== Women ===
Event	Record	Athlete	Date	Meet	Place	Ref.
100 m	11.47 (+1.7 m/s) (heat)	Pon-Karidjatou Traoré	29 July 2015		Castres, France	
100 m	11.47 (+1.7 m/s) (final)	Pon-Karidjatou Traoré	29 July 2015		Castres, France	
200 m	23.34 (+1.7 m/s)	Sarah Tondé	23 July 2005		Ouagadougou, Burkina Faso	
400 m	51.66	Sita Sibiri	19 July 2025	French U23 Championships	Saint-Étienne, France	
800 m	2:13.30	Honorine Yaméogo	20 July 2003		Ouagadougou, Burkina Faso	
1500 m	4:39.4 h	Zanata Domo	18 July 1997		Cotonou, Benin	
3000 m	10:36.20	Julie Kaboré	15 July 2017		Ouagadougou, Burkina Faso	
5000 m	17:43.7 h	Samatou Tindé	11 July 2015		Ouagadougou, Burkina Faso	
10,000 m						
Marathon	4:00.37	Nicole Badolo	29 May 2010		Ouagadougou, Burkina Faso	
100 m hurdles	12.81 (+1.3 m/s)	Marthe Koala	23 May 2021	Championnats Regionaux de la Ligue D’athletisme	Dakar, Senegal	
400 m hurdles	55.49	Aïssata Soulama	22 July 2007	All-Africa Games	Algiers, Algeria	
3000 m steeplechase						
High jump	1.94 m	Irène Tiéndrebeogo	1 August 1999		Niort, France	
Pole vault	2.80 m	Lynda Ouédraogo	11 May 2008		Dreux, France	
Pole vault	2.80 m	Lynda Ouédraogo	18 May 2008		Aix-en-Provence, France	
Long jump	6.64 m (+1.5 m/s) (Note: record set during heptathlon competition)	Marthe Koala	17 June 2018	Kladno Czech Combined Events Championships	Abidjan, Ivory Coast	
Long jump	6.64 m (−1.0 m/s) (Note: record set during heptathlon competition)	Marthe Koala	30 May 2021	Hypo-Meeting	Götzis, Austria	
Long jump	6.69 m A (+0.3 m/s)	Marthe Koala	29 April 2023	Botswana Golden Grand Prix	Gaborone, Botswana	
Long jump	6.94 m (+1.2 m/s)	Marthe Koala	2 August 2023	Jeux de la Francophonie	Kinshasa, Democratic Republic of Congo	
Triple jump	13.63 m (+1.3 m/s)	Chantal Ouoba	20 May 2001		Ouagadougou, Burkina Faso	
Shot put	14.13 m	Brigitte Traoré	16 December 2003		Ouagadougou, Burkina Faso	
Discus throw	50.12 m	Brigitte Traoré	24 July 2005		Ouagadougou, Burkina Faso	
Hammer throw	68.59 m	Lætitia Bambara	18 July 2016	Meeting International de Sotteville	Sotteville-les-Rouen, France	
Javelin throw	46.79 m	Estelle Kagambéga	20 May 2001		Ouagadougou, Burkina Faso	
Heptathlon	6250 pts	Marthe Koala	29–30 May 2021	Hypo-Meeting	Götzis, Austria	
Heptathlon	100m H / High jump / Shot put / 200m / Long jump / Javelin / 800m; 13.08 (−0.8 m/s) / 1.74 m / 13.96 m / 23.74 (−0.4 m/s) / 6.64 m (−1.0 m/s) / 43.52 m / 2:33.49					
20 km walk (road)						
4 × 100 m relay	45.99	Burkina Faso; Mariette Mien; Sarah Tondé; Kadidjatou Traoré; Béatrice Kamboulé	13 December 2005	Jeux de la Francophonie	Niamey, Niger	
4 × 400 m relay	3:48.19	Burkina Faso; F. Combari; M. Bancé; R. Fofana; F. Koala	10 September 2017		Ouagadougou, Burkina Faso	

=== Mixed ===
Event	Record	Athlete	Date	Meet	Place	Ref.
4 × 400 m relay	3:33.85	Burkina Faso	30 May 2021		Zaria, Nigeria	

== Indoor ==
=== Men ===
Event	Record	Athlete	Date	Meet	Place	Ref.
60 m	6.76	Gérard Kobéané	15 January 2016	Blazer Invitational	Birmingham, United States	
60 m	6.76 (Note: rolling start)	Idrissa Sanou	26 January 2008		Mondeville, France	
200 m	21.39	Innocent Bologo	1 March 2020		Liévin, France	
400 m	48.42	Esaie Somda	10 February 2024	Pré France Individuels en Salle	Rennes, France	
800 m	1:55.08	Bertrand Oubida	26 February 2012	CUNYAC Indoor Track & Field Championships	New York City, United States	
1000 m	3:16.50	Aziz Abdul Ouedraogo	12 December 2004		Fronton, France	
1500 m						
3000 m
3000 m	9:02.33 (Note: outdoor mark ratified as absolute record)	Moctaré Simporé	16 January 2022		Berlin, Germany	
60 m hurdles	7.83	Florian Somé	31 January 2017		Reims, France	
60 m hurdles	7.83	Florian Somé	3 February 2018		Magglingen, Switzerland	
High jump	2.19 m	Boubacar Séré	20 January 2008		Leverkusen, Germany	
Pole vault	2.60 m	Aziz Abdul Ouédraogo	12 December 2004		Fronton, France	
Long jump	8.06 m (Note: outdoor mark ratified as absolute record)	Franck Zio	3 February 1996	Meeting Pas de Calais	Liévin, France	
Triple jump	18.07 m	Hugues Fabrice Zango	16 January 2021		Aubière, France	
Shot put	16.04 m	Timothee Lengani	22 January 2022		Val-de-Reuil, France	
Heptathlon						
Heptathlon	60m / Long jump / Shot put / High jump / 60m H / Pole vault / 1000m					
5000 m walk						
4 × 400 m relay						

=== Women ===
Event	Record	Athlete	Date	Meet	Place	Ref.
60 m	7.48	Pon-Kadidjatou Traoré	8 February 2014		Aubière, France	
200 m	24.87	Elodie Ouédraogo	28 January 1996		Ghent, Belgium	
400 m	55.54	Sita Sibiri	21 March 2025	World Championships	Nanjing, China	
800 m						
1500 m						
3000 m						
60 m hurdles	8.13	Marthe Koala	9 February 2020		Metz, France	
High jump	1.81 m	Irène Tiéndrebeogo	15 February 1998		Bordeaux, France	
Pole vault	2.60 m	Lynda Ouédraogo	5 December 2010		Montpellier, France	
Long jump	6.11 m	Marthe Koala	1 February 2020	Meeting National Elite	Mondeville, France	
Triple jump	12.94 m	Christophele Ouattara	16 March 2013		Lyon, France	
Shot put	14.56 m	Ivonne Coulibaly	17 December 2021		Quebec City, Canada	
Pentathlon						
Pentathlon	60m H / High jump / Shot put / Long jump / 800m					
3000 m walk	24:16.84	Lynda Quédraogo	2 December 2007		L'Isle-sur-la-Sorgue, France	
4 × 400 m relay						
