= Siaka =

Siaka may refer to the following people:

Given name

- Siaka Bagayoko (born 1998), Malian football defender
- Siaka Bamba (born 1989), Ivorian football midfielder
- Siaka Son (born 1980), Burkinabé sprinter
- Siaka Stevens (1905–1988), leader of Sierra Leone
- Siaka Stevens (Ghanaian politician)
- Siaka Tiéné (born 1982), Ivorian footballer
- Siaka Touré (1935–1985), Guinean military commander

Surname

- Dagno Siaka (born 1987), Ivorian footballer
- Lega Siaka (born 1992), Papua New Guinean cricketer
- Pauke Siaka (born 1986), Papua New Guinean cricketer
