= 2004 African Championships in Athletics – Men's 200 metres =

Men's 200 meter even in 2004 African athletic championships

The men's 200 metres event at the 2004 African Championships in Athletics was held in Brazzaville, Republic of the Congo on July 16–18.

== Medalists ==
Gold	Silver	Bronze
Joseph Batangdon; Cameroon	Ambrose Ezenwa; Nigeria	Morné Nagel; South Africa

== Results ==
=== Heats ===
Wind:
Heat 1: -2.1 m/s, Heat 2: +0.9 m/s, Heat 3: -1.1 m/s, Heat 4: -2.7 m/s, Heat 5: -2.1 m/s, Heat 6: -1.8 m/s

Rank	Heat	Name	Nationality	Time	Notes
1	1	Tlhalosang Molapisi	Botswana	21.67	Q
2	1	Clement Agyeman	Ghana	21.82	Q
3	1	Clinton Venter	South Africa	21.85	q
4	1	Smail Daif	Morocco	22.04	
5	1	Mahadi Mounir	Chad	23.21	
	1	Alfred Engone	Gabon	DQ	
1	2	Ambrose Ezenwa	Nigeria	21.15	Q
2	2	Oumar Loum	Senegal	21.56	Q
3	2	Idrissa Adam	Cameroon	21.65	q
4	2	Wetere Galcha	Ethiopia	22.37	
1	3	Joseph Batangdon	Cameroon	20.77	Q
2	3	Japheth Ogamba	Kenya	21.56	Q
3	3	Gad Boakye	Ghana	21.80	q
4	3	Abdallah Hussein	Somalia	24.35	
1	4	Soleiman Salem Ayed	Egypt	21.22	Q
2	4	Lewis Banda	Zimbabwe	21.26	Q
3	4	Ben Youssef Meité	Ivory Coast	22.18	
4	4	Oumar Bella Bah	Guinea	22.66	
1	5	Jaysuma Saidy Ndure	Gambia	21.22	Q
2	5	Morné Nagel	South Africa	21.52	Q
3	5	Narcisse Tevoedjre	Benin	21.84	q
4	5	Hadhari Djaffar	Comoros	21.94	
5	5	Saidu Varney	Liberia	22.18	
6	5	Fidèle Kitengé	Democratic Republic of the Congo	23.07	
1	6	Alain Olivier Nyounai	Cameroon	21.71	Q
2	6	Nabie Foday Fofanah	Guinea	21.77	Q
3	6	Chinedu Oriala	Guinea	22.11	
4	6	Delivert Kimbembe	Republic of the Congo	22.44	
5	6	Bourma Malato Ouya	Chad	23.30	

=== Semifinals ===
Wind:
Heat 1: -0.7 m/s, Heat 2: +0.6 m/s

Rank	Heat	Name	Nationality	Time	Notes
1	1	Joseph Batangdon	Cameroon	20.68	Q
2	2	Ambrose Ezenwa	Nigeria	20.84	Q
3	1	Morné Nagel	South Africa	20.91	Q
4	1	Jaysuma Saidy Ndure	Gambia	21.04	Q
5	2	Lewis Banda	Zimbabwe	21.08	Q
6	2	Soleiman Salem Ayed	Egypt	21.10	Q
7	1	Oumar Loum	Senegal	21.32	Q
8	1	Idrissa Adam	Cameroon	21.34	
9	2	Clinton Venter	South Africa	21.44	Q
10	2	Japheth Ogamba	Kenya	21.51	
11	2	Nabie Foday Fofanah	Guinea	21.60	
12	1	Clement Agyeman	Ghana	21.65	
13	2	Gad Boakye	Ghana	21.69	
14	1	Tlhalosang Molapisi	Botswana	21.70	
15	2	Alain Olivier Nyounai	Cameroon	21.78	
16	1	Narcisse Tevoedjre	Benin	22.04	

=== Final ===
Wind: 0.0 m/s

Rank	Name	Nationality	Time	Notes
1st place, gold medalist(s)	Joseph Batangdon	Cameroon	20.46	
2nd place, silver medalist(s)	Ambrose Ezenwa	Nigeria	20.75	
3rd place, bronze medalist(s)	Morné Nagel	South Africa	20.83	
4	Lewis Banda	Zimbabwe	21.08	
5	Soleiman Salem Ayed	Egypt	21.09	
6	Jaysuma Saidy Ndure	Gambia	21.19	
7	Oumar Loum	Senegal	21.43	
8	Clinton Venter	South Africa	21.63	

== Bibliography ==
- Results
