= Vusa Mkhaya =

Zimbabwean singer

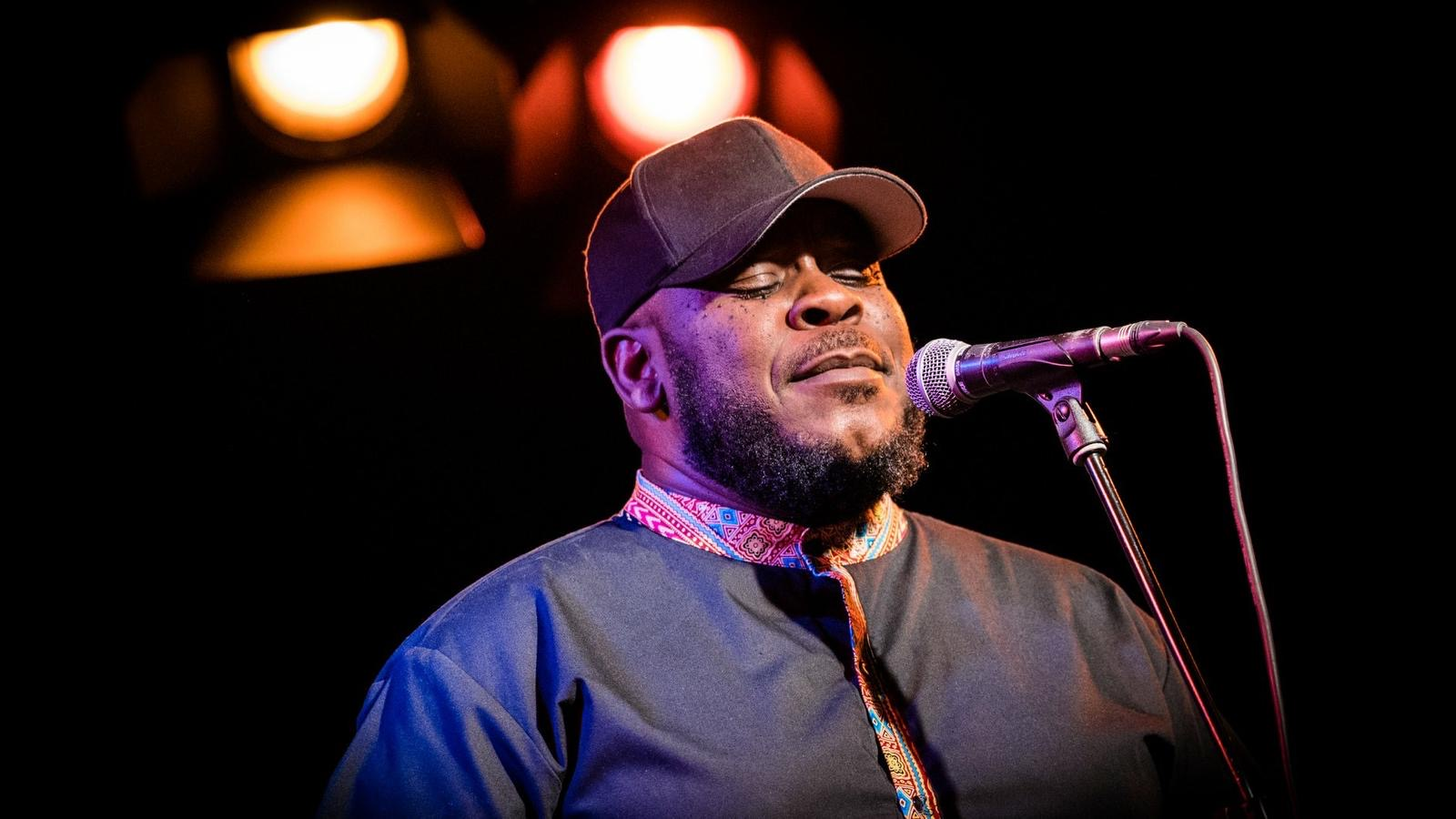

Background information
- Born: Vusumuzi Ndlovu; 19 October 1974 (age 52); Bulawayo, Zimbabwe
- Origin: Zimbabwe
- Genre: Afro Pop/Afro Soul Imbube/World Music/Crossover
- Occupations: Singer; Songwriter; Producer
- Instrument: Vocals
- Years active: 1991–present
- Label: Mkhaya Music Productions
- Website: www.mkhaya.net

Vusa Mkhaya is a Zimbabwean singer, songwriter, composer and producer best known for being a member of the award winning vocal trio, INSINGIZI. With his primary genre being Imbube, Vusa Mkhaya is still not shying out of experimenting with other genres through features with other artists around the world. One prominent EDM artist Ben Böhmer sampled one of his compositions "Amathalenta" in 2020 to an EDM hit single "Cappadocia" which reached over 25 million streams on Spotify.

== Early life ==
Vusa Mkhaya was born and raised in Tshabalala township, Bulawayo, Zimbabwe.

== Education ==
Vusa's formal education began at Mahlabezulu Primary School in Bulawayo, where he developed his vocal abilities under the guidance of choir masters.

He continued his education at Ihlathi High School, where he was an active member of the Scripture Union and co-founded an Imbube group with his classmate Ndebenkulu Ndlovu. During this time, he honed his performance skills, drawing inspiration from the music of Ladysmith Black Mambazo and other gospel groups before transitioning to original compositions. In his final years of secondary education, he moved to Ntabazinduna and attended Nhlambabaloyi Secondary School, a move that introduced him to new musical opportunities.

Under the mentorship of choir master Mr. Nyathi, he joined the school's choir and Imbube group, becoming a lead vocalist. His standout performances, including a memorable debut at a school assembly, earned him recognition among students and teachers. Ndlovu also found inspiration in other groups, such as Insingizi Emnyama, a Mzilikazi-based ensemble that he later joined after completing his education.

== Career ==
Vusa Mkhaya's professional music career began to take shape in 1995, when they toured Europe for the first time with INSINGIZI. In 2001 he composed the song "Sohlangana khona" while on tour in Denmark.

He rose to fame with his much appreciated and celebrated outfit Insingizi in 2004 through the debut album, Spirit of Africa. His first solo music album was The Spirit of Ubuntu in 2006. He released his second solo album, Vocalism in 2012 after releasing the debut album The Spirit of Ubuntu in 2006. He then released his third solo album, Manyanyatha in 2016. In January 2018, he held a show at the Bulawayo Theatre with local singer Nkwali, dubbed From Bulawayo to the World, the show was meant to celebrate music from the city. He has also sang the theme song for the 2018 Oscar nominated film, Watu Wote.

His album, UManyanyatha was then re-released internationally on 26 June 2020 under Canadian record label Naxos, with additional songs digitally re-mastered and with a new title UManyanyatha – Songs from the Soul of Zimbabwe. Explaining how he came up with the title name for his third album:

Manyanyatha is my nickname that my uncle gave me as a kid. I am told every time music was played on radio or TV I stood up and sang along and danced. This is how the name Manyanyatha was born. So I am paying tribute to those that encouraged me to sing when I was growing up.

== Awards and nominations ==
Year	Award	Category	Result
2015	Austrian World Music Awards	Best Artist	Nominated
2019	Zimbabwe Achievers Awards (UK)	Service to Music and Cultural Promotions	Won
2020	National Arts Merits Awards (NAMA)	Outstanding Artist in the Diapora	Won
2020	Roil Bulawayo Arts Awards	Outstanding Male Artist	Nominated
2021	Roil Bulawayo Arts Awards	Outstanding Ambassador	Won
2022	Roil Bulawayo Arts Awards	Outstanding Ambassador	Nominated
2024	Willi Resetarits Award Austria	Recognition in Artistic originality and social commitment	Won

== Discography ==
=== Albums ===
- The Spirit of Ubuntu (2006)
- Vocalism (2012)
- Umanyanyatha (2016)
- Umanyanyatha: Songs from the Soul of Zimbabwean (2020)
- Khanyisa (2022)

== Albums ==
=== The Spirit of Ubuntu (2006) ===
The spirit of Ubuntu was recorded in Vienna Austria and produced by Roland Guggenbichler. This was the album that introduced Mkhaya as a solo artist. After the release of the album in 2006 he toured with his band performing in The Netherlands, Austria, Slovakia, Uganda (Bayimba International Festival) and Zanzibar (Sauti Za Busara Festival).

=== Vocalism (2012) ===
The album Vocalism was recorded in Austria at Puresound Recordings and in Bulawayo Zimbabwe at 10th District Music. Additional vocal recordings were made at Mkhaya’s home studio. The album was produced by Vusa Mkhaya and Marketed & Distributed by ARC Music worldwide. It reached number 10 at the World Music Central Best World Music Albums of 2012

It reached number 127 in the top nominated albums in the World Music Chats Europe

The song Sohlangana khona has more than half a million streams on Spotify.

=== UMANYANYATHA (2016) ===
This album was recorded in Austria and produced by Roman Schwendt. Additional vocals were recorded at 10th District studio in Bulawayo. The album was marketed and distributed worldwide by ARC Music. It got an amazing response and the song Manyanyatha became an anthem at Mkhaya’s live shows especially in his home town Bulawayo.

=== Umanyanyatha:Songs From The Soul Of Zimbabwe (2020) ===
This album was recorded in Bulawayo at Loud Records and additional recording at Bethline studio in JHB South Africa. It was produced by Vusa Mkhaya and it features various artists: Msiz Kay, Victore Kunonga, Bhekiwe, Luke Delukes, Charles Banda, Taboka Nleya, Pauline Njini and Moyoxide. The album was supported by Open Society Initiative for Southern Africa.

=== Khanyisa (2022) ===
This is what we call the Covid album. It was recorded during Covid lockdown and most of the songs were also written during that time. The album was recorded in 4 countries and most of the recording was virtually. The keyboards and additional programming was done by Prince Joel Nyoni in the UK. The Guitars were played and recorded by Mthabiso Moyo in JHB South Africa, The percussion on the song Ngiyabongamina is by Bruce Ncube and was recorded in the UK. The lead and Background vocals were recorded at Mkhaya’s home studio. Additional background recordings by Mimi Tarukwana were recorded in Bulawayo. The album was produced by Vusa Mkhaya for Mkhaya Music Production.

== Filmography ==
Year	Category	Title	Role	Link
2009	Documentary	Drakensberg: Barrier of Spears	Singer & Co-Composer	
2010	Documentary	Zambezi The Thundering River	Singer & Co-Composer	
2016	Documentary	In Search of the Great Song	Singer & Co-Composer	
2017	Short Film	Watu Wote (Nominated for Academy Award for Best Live Action Short Film)	Singer (Theme Song)	Watu Wote
2018	Film	Mia and the White Lion	Singer	Mia and the White Lion
2022	Film	Transactions	Music Composer & Singer	
2024	Documentary	Building Africa	Music Composer & Singer	
