= Lewis Banda =

Zimbabwean sprinter

Personal information
- Nationality: Zimbabwean
- Born: September 16, 1982 (age 43) Bulawayo, Zimbabwe

Sport
- Sport: Sprinting
- Events: 400 meters, 4x400 Relay, 4x100 Relay
- College team: Texas Christian University

Achievements and titles
- Personal best: 400m: 44.48 s
Medal record
Representing Zimbabwe
Men's athletics
Gold medal – first place	2004 African Championships in Athletics	4 × 400 metres relay
Bronze medal – third place	2007 All-Africa Games	4 × 400 metres relay
Bronze medal – third place	2007 All-Africa Games	4 × 100 metres relay

Lewis Simon Banda (born 16 September 1982 in Tshabalala) is a Zimbabwean sprinter who specializes in the 400 metres. He is from Bulawayo, Zimbabwe.

His personal best time is 44.58 seconds, achieved in May 2004 in Tucson. This is the current Zimbabwean record. The same year he reached the semi-finals of the Olympic Games.

Banda was an All-American sprinter for the Arizona State Sun Devils track and field team, finishing runner-up in the 4 × 100 metres relay at the 2004 NCAA Division I Outdoor Track and Field Championships and in the 4 × 400 metres relay at the 2005 NCAA Division I Outdoor Track and Field Championships.

Banda transferred to Texas Christian University for his final year of collegiate competition in 2006. He was a five-time All-American for the TCU Horned Frogs track and field team during that year, finishing 3rd in the 400 metres at the 2006 NCAA Division I Indoor Track and Field Championships.

== Competition record ==
Year	Competition	Venue	Position	Event	Notes
Representing Zimbabwe
2002	Commonwealth Games	Manchester, United Kingdom	–	400	DQ
2002	Commonwealth Games	Manchester, United Kingdom	–	4 × 400 m relay	DQ
2004	African Championships	Brazzaville, Republic of the Congo	4th	200 m	21.08
2004	African Championships	Brazzaville, Republic of the Congo	1st	4 × 400 m relay	3:02.38
2004	Olympic Games	Athens, Greece	8th (sf)	400 m	45.23
2006	African Championships	Bambous, Mauritius	7th	400 m	47.18
2007	All-Africa Games	Algiers, Algeria	20th (sf)	400	47.22
2007	All-Africa Games	Algiers, Algeria	3rd	4 × 100 m relay	39.16 (NR)
2007	All-Africa Games	Algiers, Algeria	3rd	4 × 400 m relay	3:04.84
2007	World Championships	Osaka, Japan	28th (h)	400 m	45.47
2008	Olympic Games	Beijing, China	47th (h)	400 m	46.76
