= Jean Tarcisius Batamboc =

Cameroonian sprinter

Jean Tarcisius Batamboc (born 1 October 1987) is a Cameroonian sprinter who specializes in the 100 metres.

He competed at the 2011 All-Africa Games, the 2012 African Championships, the 2014 African Championships and the 2015 African Games without progressing from the heats. He then competed at the 2017 World Championships, ending last in the heats.

As a part of the Cameroonian 4 × 100 metres relay team he finished fifth at the 2012 African Championships and sixth at the 2014 African Championships.
