= Siaka Stevens (Ghanaian politician) =

Ghanaian politician (born 1964)

Hon. Stevens Siaka

Member of the Ghana Parliament for Jaman North constituency

Personal details
- Born: 31 December 1964 (age 61) Sampa, Ghana
- Party: New Patriotic Party
- Occupation: Politician

Stevens Siaka (born 31 December 1964) is a Ghanaian politician and member of the Seventh Parliament of the Fourth Republic of Ghana representing the Jaman North constituency in the Bono Region on the ticket of the New Patriotic Party. Siaka Stevens was a former chairman of the Parliamentary Select Committee on Education and he was the Deputy Minister for Bono Region from 26 March 2019 till January 2021.

== Early life and education ==
Siaka was born on 31 December 1964 and hails from Sampa in the Bono Region of Ghana. He had his master's degree in Public Administration and Post Graduate Diploma from GIMPA. He also had his bachelor's degree in Management and Diploma in Accounting and Business Management from the University of Education, Winneba. He also earned a Diploma in Accounting and Business Management from the Cambridge Tutorial College in London and obtained a certificate in Commercial Law from the Institute of Management Studies.

== Politics ==
Siaka is a member of the New Patriotic Party. He was the Deputy Regional Minister for Bono Region from 27 March 2019 to January 2021.

=== 2012 election ===
Siaka first contested the Jaman north constituency parliamentary seat on the ticket of the New Patriotic Party during the 2012 Ghanaian general election and won with 14,920 votes representing 50.34% over the parliamentary candidate for the National Democratic Congress Asum-Ahensah Alex who pulled 14, 718 which is equivalent to 49.66% of the total votes.

==== 2016 election ====
Siaka was re-elected as a member of parliament for Jaman north constituency on the ticket of the New Patriotic Party during the 2016 Ghanaian general election with 14,715 votes representing 51.90% of the total votes. He won the election over Ahenkwah Yaw Frederick of the National Democratic Congress who pulled 13,216 votes which is equivalent to 46.61%, parliamentary candidate for the Progressive People's Party Nsoah Joseph had 327 votes representing 1.15% and the parliamentary candidate for the Convention People's Party Sammor-Duah Emmanuel had 95 votes representing 0.34% of the total votes.

===== 2020 election =====
Siaka again contested the Jaman north (Ghana parliament constituency) parliamentary seat on the ticket of New Patriotic Party during the 2020 Ghanaian general election but lost the election to Frederick Yaw Ahenkwah of the National Democratic Congress.
