= Jaman North (Ghana parliament constituency) =

Constituency in the Bono Region of Ghana

- constituency for the Parliament of Ghana
- District: Jaman North District
- Region: Bono Region of Ghana

Current constituency
- Created: 2004
- Party: National Democratic Congress
- MP: Frederick Yaw Ahenkwah

Jaman North is one of the constituencies represented in the Parliament of Ghana. It elects one Member of Parliament (MP) by the first past the post system of election. Frederick Yaw Ahenkwah is the member of parliament for the constituency. Jaman North is located in the Jaman North district of the Bono Region of Ghana.

This seat was created prior to the Ghanaian parliamentary election in 2004.

== Boundaries ==
The seat is located within the Jaman North District of the Bono Region of Ghana.

== History ==
The constituency was first created in 2004 by the Electoral Commission of Ghana along with 29 other new ones, increasing the number of constituencies from 200 to 230.

== Members of Parliament ==
First elected	Member	Party
2004	Constituency created	
2004	Alexander Asum Ahensah	National Democratic Congress
2012	Siaka Stevens	New Patriotic Party

== Elections ==
2004 Ghanaian parliamentary election:Jaman North Source:Ghana Home Page
Party	Candidate	Votes	%	±%
National Democratic Congress	Alexander Asum Ahensah	12,027	52.1	N/A
New Patriotic Party	Dr Kof Oti Ankrah	10,424	45.1	N/A
Convention People's Party	Kwasi Twene Aduasare	437	1.9	N/A
Democratic People's Party	Freeman Abdulai	206	0.9	N/A
Majority		1,603	7.0	N/A

== See also ==
- List of Ghana Parliament constituencies
