= Roscoe Engel =

South African sprinter (born 1989)

Medal record

Men's athletics

Representing South Africa

African Championships
Gold medal – first place	2012 Porto-Novo	4×100 m

Roscoe Engel (born 6 March 1989 in Cape Town) is a South African sprinter.

His personal bests are 10.06 in the 100 metres (+1.7 m/s, Pretoria 2018) and 20.44 in the 200 metres (+1.8 m/s, Pretoria 2018).

He also set a time of 15.17 over 150 meters (−0.3 m/s, Pretoria 2018) to beat Justin Gatlin the then reigning World 100m Champion.

== Competition record ==
Year	Competition	Venue	Position	Event	Notes
Representing South Africa
2008	World Junior Championships	Bydgoszcz, Poland	26th (h)	100 m	10.72
2008	World Junior Championships	Bydgoszcz, Poland	3rd	4 × 100 m relay	39.70
2011	World Championships	Daegu, South Korea	11th (h)	4 × 100 m relay	38.72
2012	African Championships	Porto-Novo, Benin	14th (sf)	100 m	10.61
2012	African Championships	Porto-Novo, Benin	1st	4 × 100 m relay	39.26
2015	African Games	Brazzaville, Republic of the Congo	4th	100 m	10.45
2015	African Games	Brazzaville, Republic of the Congo	9th (sf)	200 m	20.99
2018	African Championships	Asaba, Nigeria	13th (sf)	100 m	10.63
