= Peter Emelieze =

Nigerian-born German sprinter

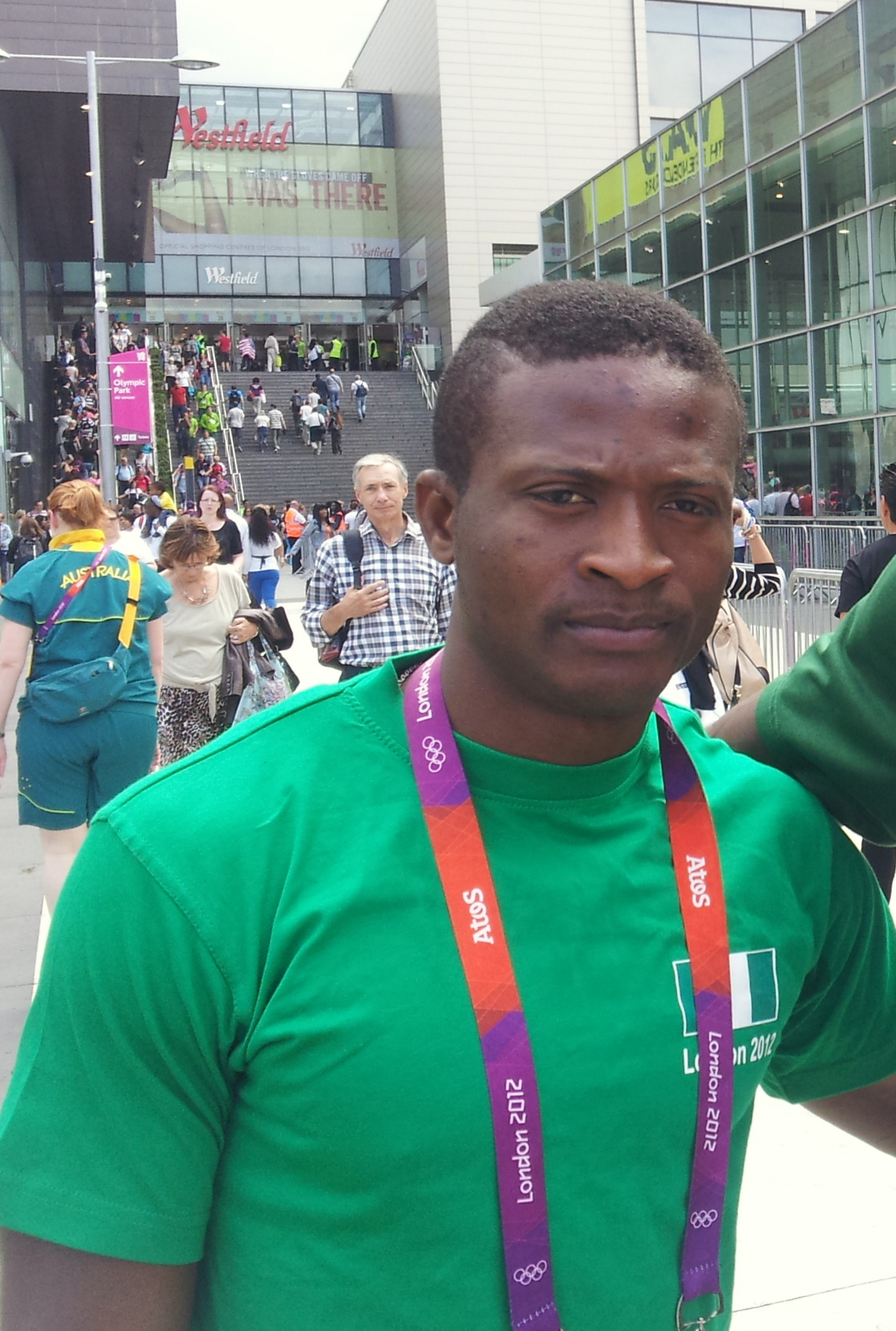
- Emelieze at the 2012 Summer Olympics

Personal information
- Born: 19 April 1988 (age 38) Lagos, Nigeria

Sport
- Country: Nigeria/Germany
- Sport: Athletics
- Event: 100m
Medal record
Men's athletics
Representing Nigeria
African Championships
| Gold medal – first place | 2006 Bambous | 4×100 m |
| Silver medal – second place | 2012 Porto-Novo | 4x100 m |

Peter O. Emelieze (born 19 April 1988) is a Nigerian-German sprinter who specializes in the 60m, 100m, and 200m.

== Life and career ==
He was born in Lagos. He reached the semi-final in 60 metres at the 2010 World Indoor Championships in Doha, Qatar.

He also participated at the Iaaf World Indoor Championship in 2012 in Istanbul, Turkey and also the World Athletics World indoor Championship in 2018 in Birmingham, United Kingdom.

His personal best times are 6.60 seconds in the 60 metres (indoor) achieved in February 2009 in Karlsruhe, Germany, and Val-de-Reuil, France, in 2012 and 21.35 seconds in the 200 metres (indoor) achieved in February 2009 in Eaubonne, France, He has a personal best of 10.18 seconds in the 100 metres, achieved in August 2008 in Bottrop, Germany, and in Weinheim, Germany, in 2011. His best times are 20.97 seconds in the 200 metres achieved in Brasschaat in July 2008.

He is a 2 times African Champion in the 4 × 100 m winning a gold medal at the African Athletics Championships in Mauritius 2006 and a silver medal in Porto-Novo, Benin, in 2012.

He participated at the 100m metres event at the 2012 Olympic Games in London, United Kingdom, with a time of 10.22 seconds.
