= Siaka Son =

Burkinabé sprinter

Siaka Son (born 31 December 1980) is a retired Burkinabé sprinter who specialized in the 100 and 200 metres.

His career highlight came when winning a gold medal in the 4 × 100 metres relay at the 2009 Jeux de la Francophonie, together with Idrissa Sanou, Innocent Bologo and Gérard Kobéané. The time of 39.57 seconds is the Burkinabé record. With the Burkinabé team Son also finished fifth at the 2005 Jeux de la Francophonie, seventh at the 2007 All-Africa Games and were disqualified at the 2010 African Championships.

He also competed in the 200 metres at the 2007 All-Africa Games, reaching the semi-final.

His personal best times were 10.74 seconds in the 100 metres, achieved in May 2008 in Ouagadougou; and 21.56 seconds in the 200 metres, achieved at the 2007 All-Africa Games in Algiers.
