= Fronton, Haute-Garonne =

Fronton
- Commune
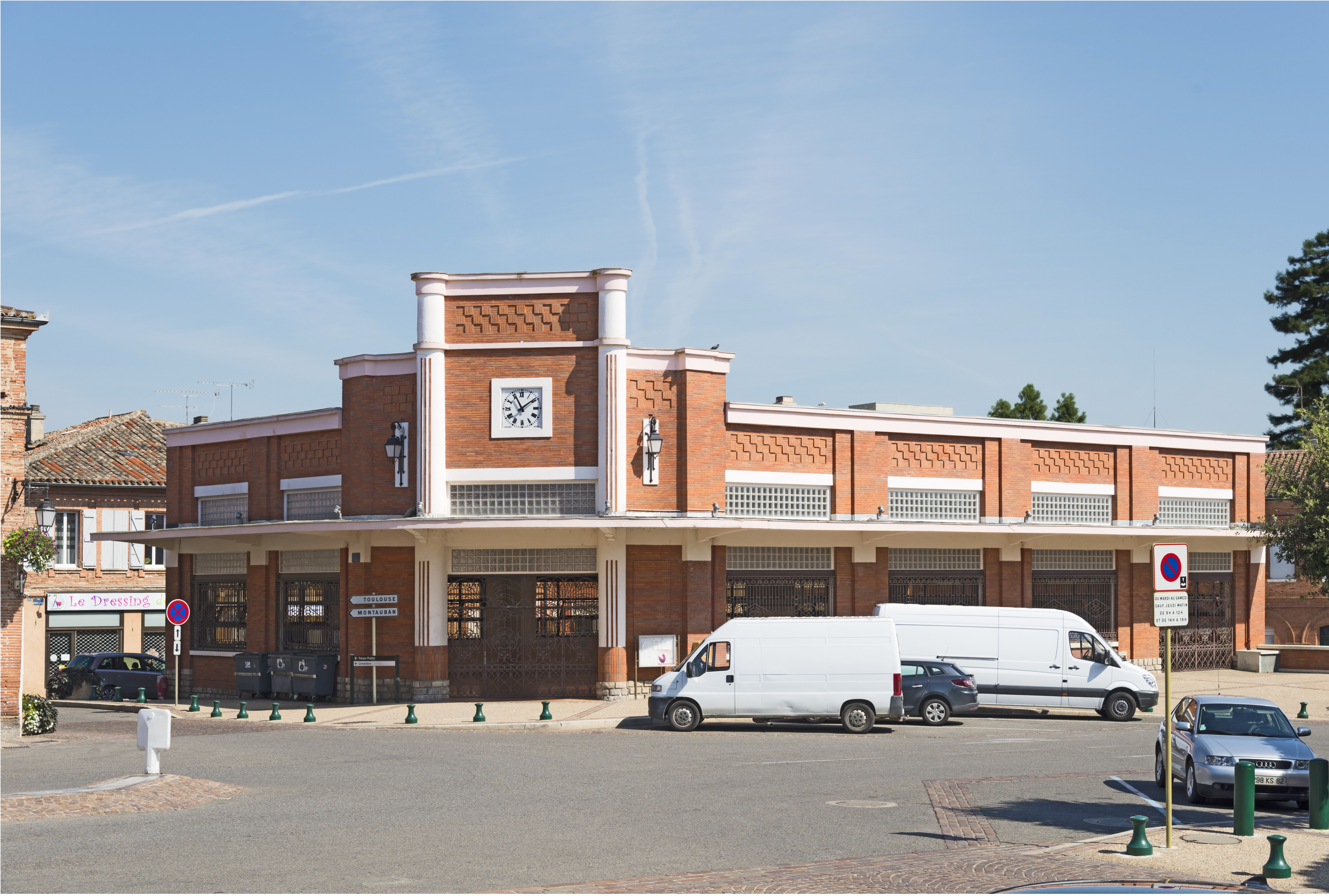
- The covered market in Fronton

- Coat of arms
- Location of Fronton
- Location within France Location within Occitanie
- Coordinates: 43°50′28″N 1°23′25″E
- Country: France
- Region: Occitania
- Department: Haute-Garonne
- Arrondissement: Toulouse
- Canton: Villemur-sur-Tarn

Government
  - Mayor (2020–2026): Hugo Cavagnac
- Area^{1}: 45.79 km^{2} (17.68 sq mi)
- Elevation: 147 m (482 ft)
- Highest elevation: 198 m (650 ft)
- Lowest elevation: 101 m (331 ft)
- Population (2023): 6,671
  - Density: 145.7/km^{2} (377.3/sq mi)
- Time zone: UTC+01:00 (CET)
  - Summer (DST): UTC+02:00 (CEST)
- INSEE/Postal code: 31202 /31620
- ^{1} French Land Register data, which excludes lakes, ponds, glaciers > 1 km^{2} (0.386 sq mi or 247 acres) and river estuaries.

Fronton (French pronunciation: [fʁɔ̃tɔ̃]; Languedocien: Frontonh) is a commune in the Haute-Garonne department in southwestern France.

It lies 28 km north of Toulouse and within its metropolitan area.

== Population ==
Historical population

Year	Pop.	±% p.a.
1793	1,633	—
1800	2,053	+3.32%
1806	2,139	+0.69%
1821	1,987	−0.49%
1831	2,225	+1.14%
1836	2,151	−0.67%
1841	2,141	−0.09%
1846	2,190	+0.45%
1851	2,143	−0.43%
1856	2,190	+0.43%
1861	2,196	+0.05%
1866	2,273	+0.69%
1872	2,290	+0.12%
1876	2,445	+1.65%
1881	2,416	−0.24%
1886	2,447	+0.26%
1891	2,481	+0.28%
1896	2,328	−1.26%
1901	2,155	−1.53%

Year	Pop.	±% p.a.
1906	2,034	−1.15%
1911	1,896	−1.40%
1921	1,901	+0.03%
1926	2,005	+1.07%
1931	2,018	+0.13%
1936	2,016	−0.02%
1946	2,049	+0.16%
1954	2,107	+0.35%
1962	2,169	+0.36%
1968	2,272	+0.78%
1975	2,525	+1.52%
1982	2,814	+1.56%
1990	3,355	+2.22%
1999	3,891	+1.66%
2007	5,233	+3.77%
2012	5,700	+1.72%
2017	6,079	+1.30%
2023	6,671	+1.56%

Source: EHESS and INSEE (1968-2023)

== Wine ==
It is the centre of one of the oldest wine regions in France, producing the AOC Côtes du Frontonnais, based (50%) on the local négrette grape (known as Pinot Saint-George in the United States) plus some or other of Syrah, Côt, cabernet franc, Cabernet sauvignon, fer servadou, gamay, cinsaut and mauzac.

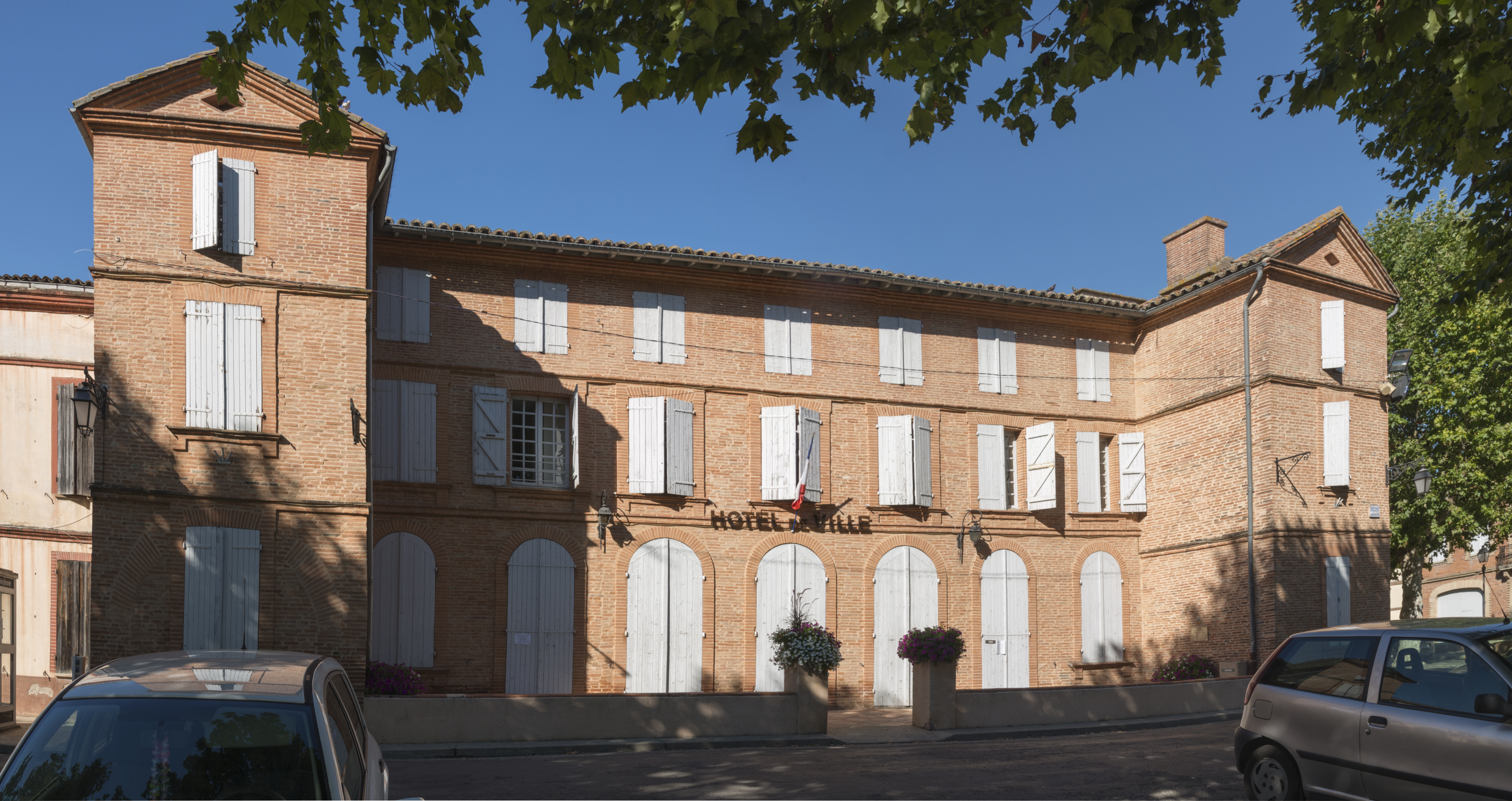
Town hall

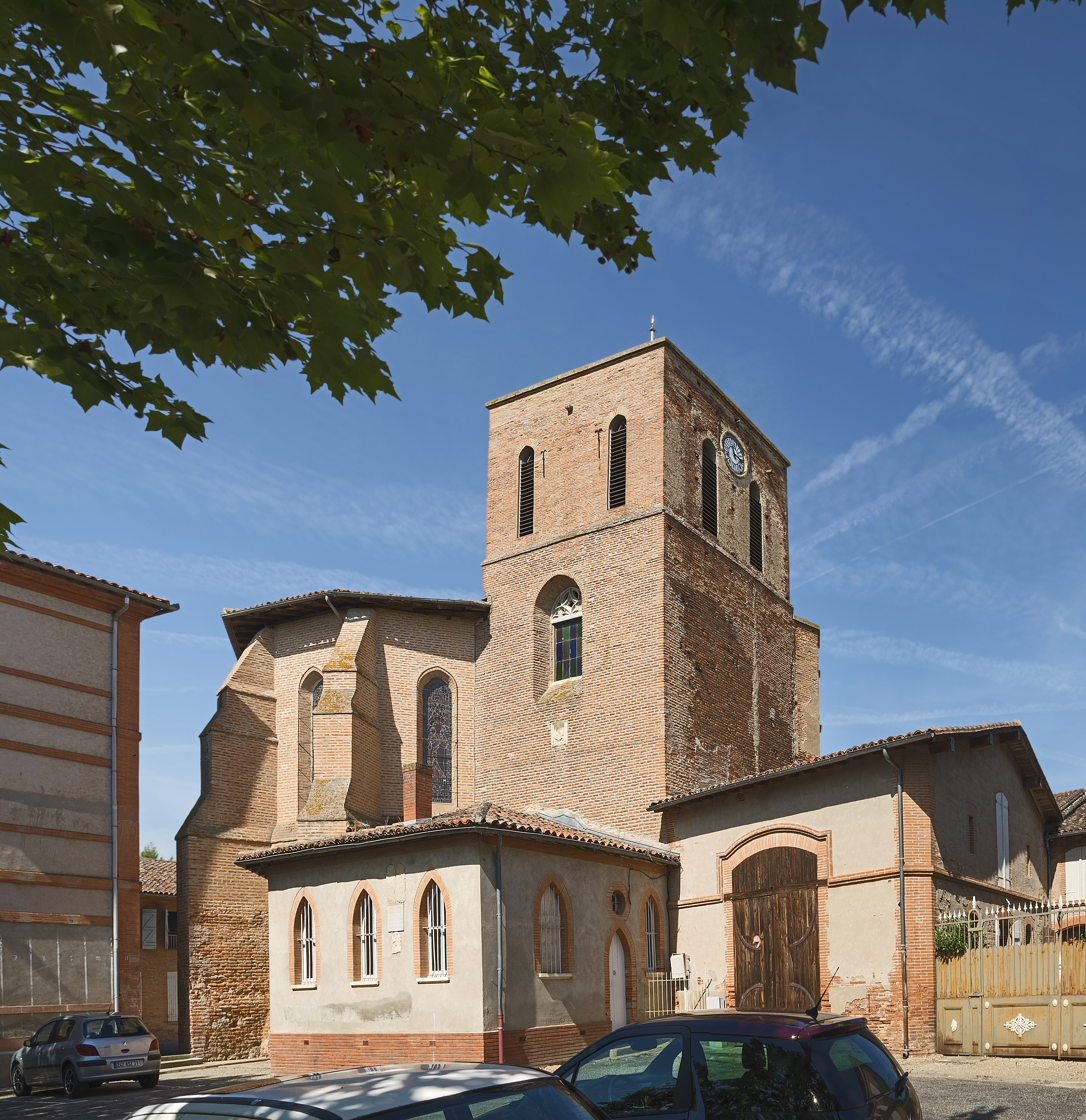
Church

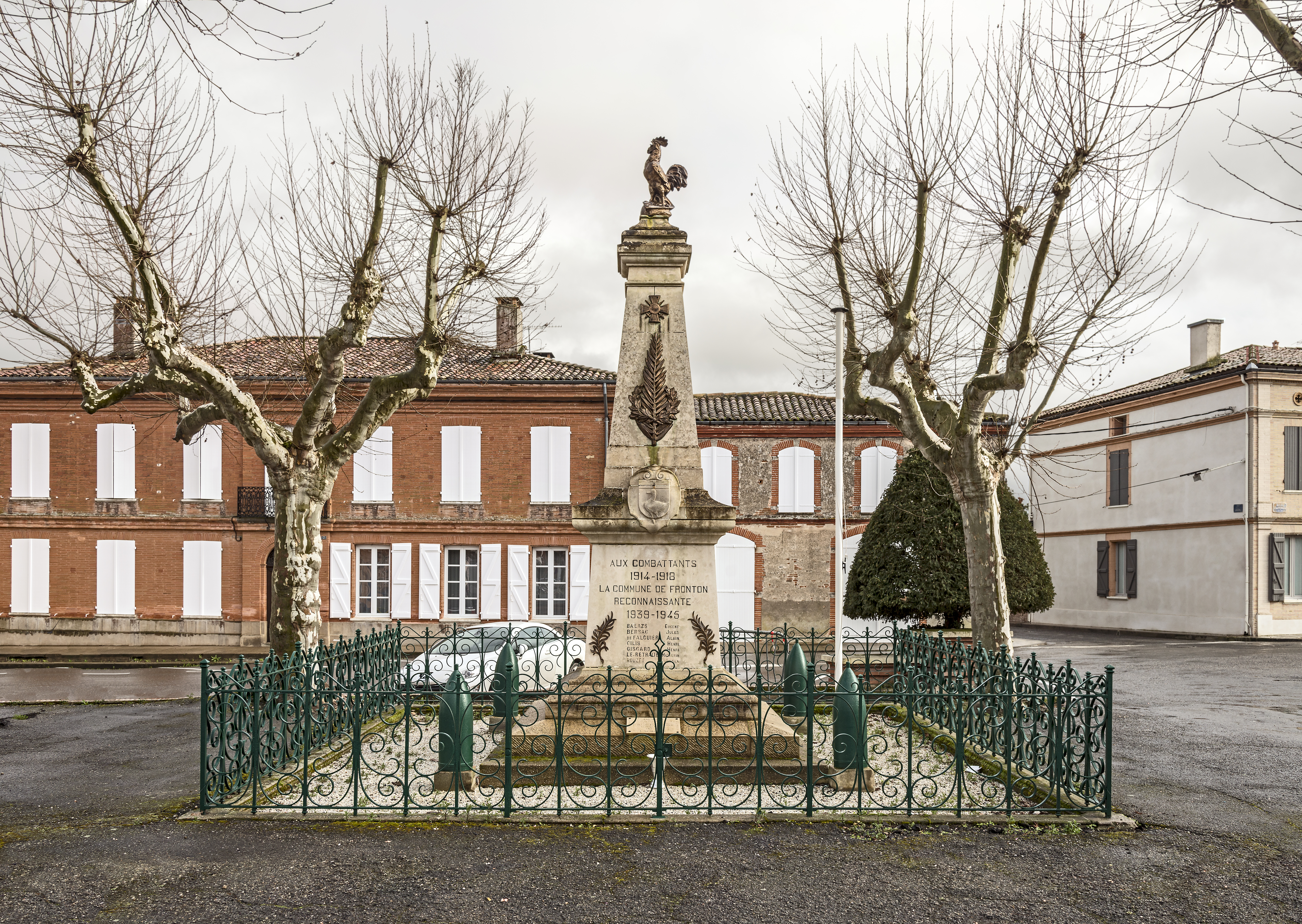
War memorial

== See also ==
- Communes of the Haute-Garonne department
