= Frederick Yaw Ahenkwah =

Ghanaian politician

Hon Frederick Yaw Ahenkwah MP
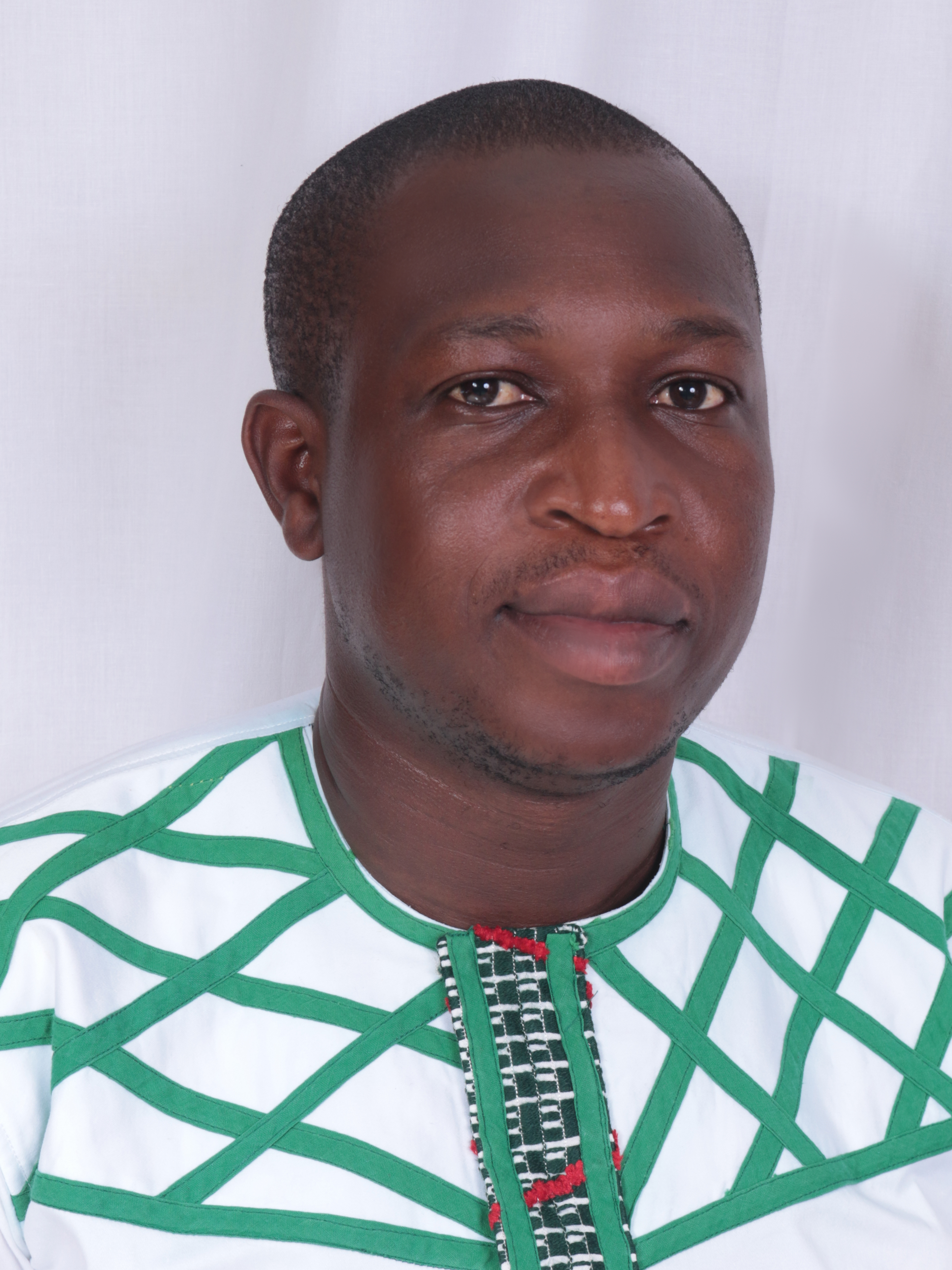

Member of Parliament for Jaman North Constituency
- Incumbent
- Assumed office 7 January 2021
- Preceded by: Siaka Stevens

Personal details
- Born: Frederick Yaw Ahenkwah; 24 June 1982 (age 43) Sampa, Ghana
- Party: National Democratic Congress
- Occupation: Politician
- Committees: Lands and Forestry Committee, Privileges Committee

Frederick Yaw Ahenkwah is a Ghanaian politician and member of parliament for the 8th parliament of the 4th Republic of Ghana representing the Jaman North constituency in the Bono region of Ghana.

== Early life and education ==
Frederick was born on 24 June 1982 and hails from Sampa in the Bono region of Ghana. He had his SSSCE in 2000. He also had his Teacher certificate in Science and Technical in 2004. He further had his Degree in Agriculture Education in 2010.

== Career ==
Frederick was a form master in the Ghana Education Service.

=== Political career ===
Frederick is a member of NDC and currently the MP for Jaman North Constituency. He won the parliamentary seat with 22,375 votes whilst the NPP parliamentary aspirant Siaka Stevens had 18,206 votes.

=== Committees ===
Frederick is a member of the Privileges Committee and also a member of the Land and Forestry Committee.

== Personal life ==
Frederick is a Christian.
