= 2021 Hypo-Meeting =

Track and field competition

- Venue: Mösle stadium
- Location: Götzis, Austria
- Dates: May 29–May 30
- Website: https://meeting-goetzis.at/en/

Champions
- Men: (Canada) Damian Warner (8995)
- Women: (Hungary) Xenia Krizsan (6651)

The 46th edition of the annual Hypo-Meeting took place on May 29 and May 30, 2021 in Götzis, Vorarlberg (Austria). The track and field competition, featuring a men's decathlon and a women's heptathlon event is part of the 2021 World Athletics Challenge – Combined Events.

The event did not take place in 2020.
