= Gogbeu Francis Koné =

Ivorian sprinter

Personal information
- Born: November 10, 1991 (age 34) Ivory Coast
- Height: 1.77 m (5 ft 10 in)
- Weight: 75 kg (165 lb)

Sport
- Country: Ivory Coast
- Sport: Track and field
- Event(s): 100 metres, 200 metres

Achievements and titles
- Personal bests: 100 m: 10.39 s (2011); 200 m: 21.45 s (2014)
Medal record
Men's track and field
Representing Ivory Coast
Jeux de la Francophonie
Gold medal – first place	2017 Abidjan	4 × 100 m relay

Gogbeu Francis Koné (born 10 November 1991) is an Ivorian sprinter who specializes in the 100 metres.

He finished eighth at the 2013 Jeux de la Francophonie. He competed at the 2010 African Championships, the 2011 All-Africa Games (semi-final), the 2012 African Championships (semi-final), the 2014 African Championships and the 2017 Jeux de la Francophonie without reaching the final.

As a part of the Ivorian 4 × 100 metres relay team he finished fourth at the 2012 African Championships and won a gold medal at the 2017 Jeux de la Francophonie.

His personal best times are 10.39 seconds in the 100 metres, achieved in September 2011 in Maputo; and 21.45 seconds in the 200 metres, achieved in April 2014 in Abidjan.
