= Hannes Dreyer =

South African sprinter

Medal record

Men's athletics

Representing South Africa

African Championships
Gold medal – first place	2008 Addis Ababa	4×100 m
Gold medal – first place	2010 Nairobi	4×100 m
Gold medal – first place	2012 Porto-Novo	4×100 m
Silver medal – second place	2006 Bambous	4×100 m
Bronze medal – third place	2008 Addis Ababa	100 m

Summer Universiade
Silver medal – second place	2007 Bangkok	4×100 m

Johannes "Hannes" Jacobus Gerhardu Dreyer (born 13 January 1985) is a South African sprinter who specializes in the 100 metres.

Dreyer represented South Africa at the 2008 Summer Olympics in Beijing. He competed at the 4 × 100 metres relay together with Leigh Julius, Ishmael Kumbane and Thuso Mpuang. In their qualification heat they did not finish due to a mistake in the baton exchange and they were eliminated.

== Education ==
He is a student at the University of Pretoria.

== Achievements ==
Year	Competition	Venue	Position	Event	Notes
Representing South Africa
2006	African Championships	Bambous, Mauritius	4th	100 m	10.74
2006	African Championships	Bambous, Mauritius	2nd	4 × 100 m relay	39.68
2007	Universiade	Bangkok, Thailand	7th (sf)	100 m	10.63
2007	Universiade	Bangkok, Thailand	2nd	4 × 100 m relay	39.20
2007	Universiade	Bangkok, Thailand	4th	4 × 400 m relay	3:06.44
2008	African Championships	Addis Ababa, Ethiopia	3rd	100 m	10.24
2008	African Championships	Addis Ababa, Ethiopia	1st	4 × 100 m relay	38.75
2009	World Championships	Berlin, Germany	14th (h)	4 × 100 m relay	39.71
2010	African Championships	Nairobi, Kenya	13th (sf)	100 m	10.49
2010	African Championships	Nairobi, Kenya	1st	4 × 100 m relay	39.12
2011	Universiade	Shenzhen, China	28th (qf)	100 m	10.63
2011	Universiade	Shenzhen, China	1st	4 × 100 m relay	39.25
2011	World Championships	Daegu, South Korea	11th (h)	4 × 100 m relay	38.72
2012	African Championships	Porto-Novo, Benin	1st	4 × 100 m relay	39.26

=== Personal bests ===
Outdoor

- 100 metres – 10.24 (2008)
- 200 metres – 20.71 (2008)

Indoor

- 60 metres – 6.66 (2009)
