= Jean-Yves Esparon =

Seychellois sprinter (born 1994)

Jean-Yves Esparon (born 8 August 1994) is a Seychellois sprinter. At the 2012 Summer Olympics, he competed in the Men's 200 metres.
