= Tshabalala =

Tshabalala is a southern African surname. Notable people with the surname include:

== Sport ==
- Daniel Tshabalala (born 1977), football player
- Evelina Tshabalala (born 1965), marathon runner and mountaineer
- Jerry Tshabalala, South African football manager
- Siphiwe Tshabalala (born 1984), football player
- Thandi Tshabalala (born 1984), cricket player
- Vincent Tshabalala (1942–2017), golfer

== Entertainment ==
- Mduduzi Tshabalala (1978–2016), South African singer performing as Mandoza
- Thandeka Tshabalala (born 1995), South African television personality
- Tokollo Tshabalala, musician
- Velile Tshabalala (born 1984), British actress of Zimbabwean descent
- Xolile Tshabalala (born 1977), South African actress
- Tschabalala Self (born 1990), American artist

== Others ==
- Cecilia Tshabalala, South African educator, women's rights activist, clubwoman and writer
- Manto Tshabalala-Msimang (1940–2009), South African politician, minister of health 1999–2008

== See also ==
- Schuks Tshabalala's Survival Guide to South Africa, a 2010 African film
