= Obinna Metu =

Nigerian sprinter

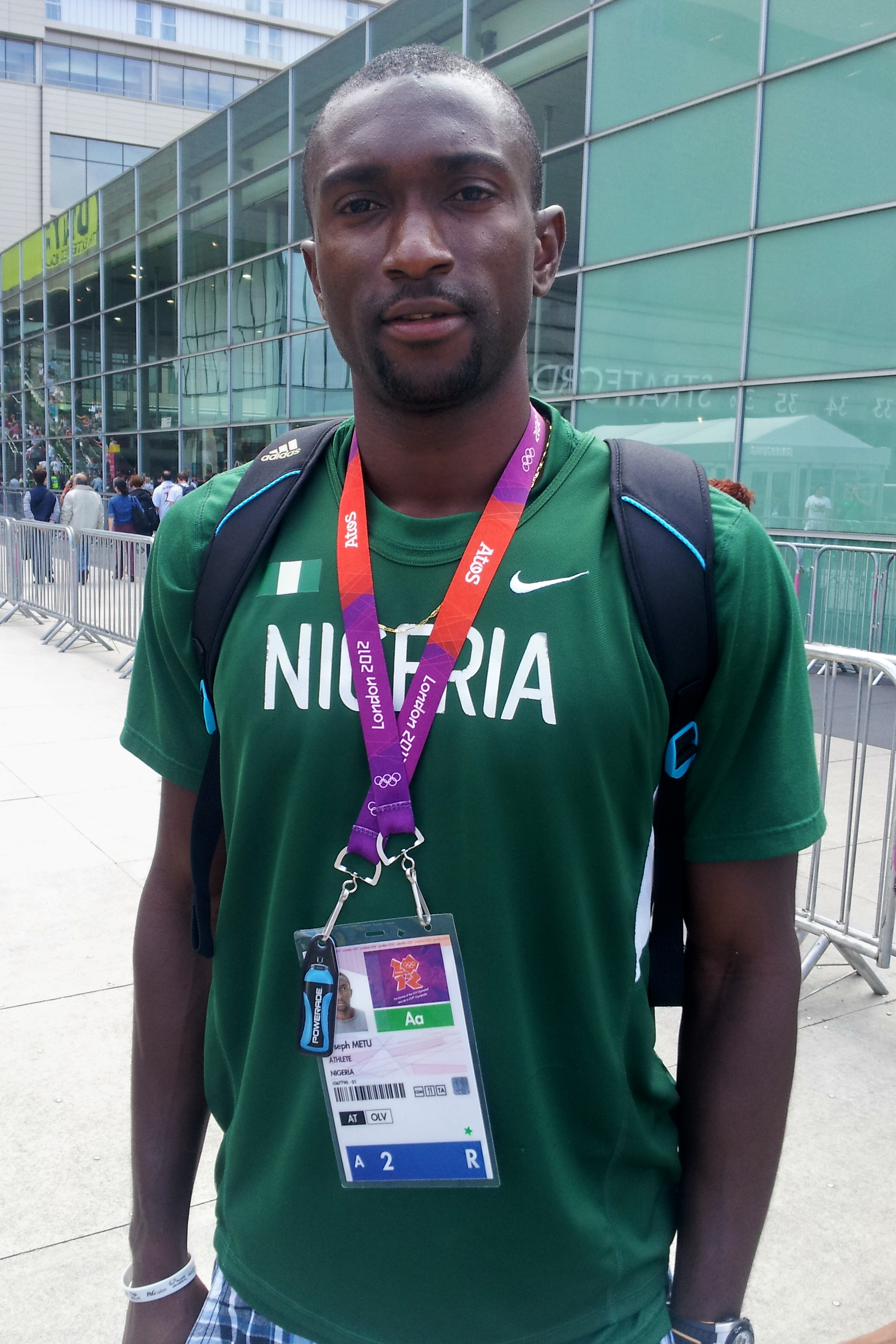
- JObinna Metu at the 2012 Summer Olympics

Personal information
- Born: 12 July 1988 (age 37) Ogidi, Nigeria
- Height: 1.89 m (6 ft 2 1/2 in)
- Weight: 76 kg (168 lb)

Sport
- Country: Nigeria
- Sport: Athletics
- Event: 100 metres
Medal record
Men's athletics
Representing Nigeria
All-Africa Games
Gold medal – first place	2007 Algiers	4×100 m
Bronze medal – third place	2007 Algiers	200 m
Bronze medal – third place	2011 Maputo	100 m
African Championships
Gold medal – first place	2014 Marrakesh	4×100 m
Silver medal – second place	2010 Nairobi	4×100 m
Silver medal – second place	2012 Porto-Novo	4×100 m

Joseph Obinna Metu // (born 12 July 1988) is a Nigerian sprinter who specializes in the 100 metres. His personal best time is 10.11 seconds, achieved in June 2012 in Calabar.

He finished eighth at the 2006 World Junior Championships. At the 2007 All-Africa Games he won a bronze medal in the 200 metres and a gold medal in the 4 × 100 metres relay. At the 2008 Summer Olympics in Beijing he competed at the 100 metres sprint and placed 2nd in his heat after Francis Obikwelu in a time of 10.34 seconds. He improved his time to 10.29 seconds for the next round, but his time was only the 6th time of the heat and he was eliminated. Together with Onyeabor Ngwogu, Chinedu Oriala and Uchenna Emedolu he also competed at the 4 × 100 metres relay. In their qualification heat they did not finish due to a mistake in the baton exchange and they were eliminated. He also took part in the 200 metres individual, finishing first in his first round heat, with a time of 20.62 seconds. With 20.65 seconds in the second round he only placed sixth in his heat, which was not enough to qualify for the semi-finals. He competed at the 2012 Summer Olympics and the 2014 Commonwealth Games.
