= Tlhalosang Molapisi =

Botswana sprinter

Personal information
- Nationality: Botswana
- Born: 15 March 1973 (age 53) Bobonong, Botswana

Sport
- Sport: Athletics
- Event(s): 100 m, 200 m

Achievements and titles
- Personal best(s): 10.44 s (100 m); 22.74 s (200 m)

Tlhalosang Molapisi (born 15 March 1973 in Bobonong) is a sprinter from Botswana. Competing mostly over 100 metres, his personal best is 10.44 seconds.

Molapisi won this event at the 2002 Africa Military Games and the 2005 African Southern Region Athletics Championships. He also competed at the 2005 World Championships in Athletics in 100 metres event where he narrowly failed to qualify for the second round, finishing in 4th in his heat with a time of 10.71 seconds.

In 2006, he competed in the 100 metres at the 2006 Commonwealth Games in Melbourne where he covered the distance in 10.85 seconds.

Molapisi broke the Botswanan record for the 100 m which was previously held by Justice Dipeba.
