= Chinedu Oriala =

Nigerian sprinter

Personal information
- Full name: Cyril Chinedu Oriala
- Born: 17 November 1981 (age 44) Umuahia, Abia, Nigeria
- Height: 168 cm (5 ft 6 in)
- Weight: 69 kg (152 lb)

Sport
- Country: Nigeria
- Sport: Athletics
- Event(s): 100 metres, 4 × 100 metres relay
Medal record
Men's athletics
Representing Nigeria
All-Africa Games
Gold medal – first place	1999 Johannesburg	4×100 m
Gold medal – first place	2007 Algiers	4×100 m
African Championships
Gold medal – first place	2002 Radès	4×100 m
Gold medal – first place	2004 Brazzaville	4×100 m

Cyril Chinedu Oriala (born 17 November 1981) is a track and field sprint athlete who competes internationally for Nigeria.

Oriala represented Nigeria at the 2008 Summer Olympics in Beijing. He competed at the 4 × 100 metres relay together with Obinna Metu, Onyeabor Ngwogu and Uchenna Emedolu. In their qualification heat they did not finish due to a mistake in the baton exchange and they were eliminated.
