= Fanuel Kenosi =

Botswana sprinter

Medal record

Men's athletics

Representing Botswana

African Championships
Bronze medal – third place	2008 Addis Ababa	200 m

Fanuel Kenosi (born 3 May 1988) is a Botswana sprinter who specializes in the 200 metres.

At the 2008 African Championships in Addis Ababa he won a bronze medal in the 200 metres, in a national record of 20.72 seconds, and finished fourth in the 4 x 400 metres relay. He competed in the 200 metres event at the 2008 Olympic Games, but without reaching the final round.

In addition to his 200 metres national record, he also has 10.58 seconds in the 100 metres, achieved at the 2007 All-Africa Games in Algiers; and 47.09 seconds in the 400 metres, achieved in April 2008 in Réduit, Mauritius.
