= Fabrice Coiffic =

Mauritian sprinter (born 1984)

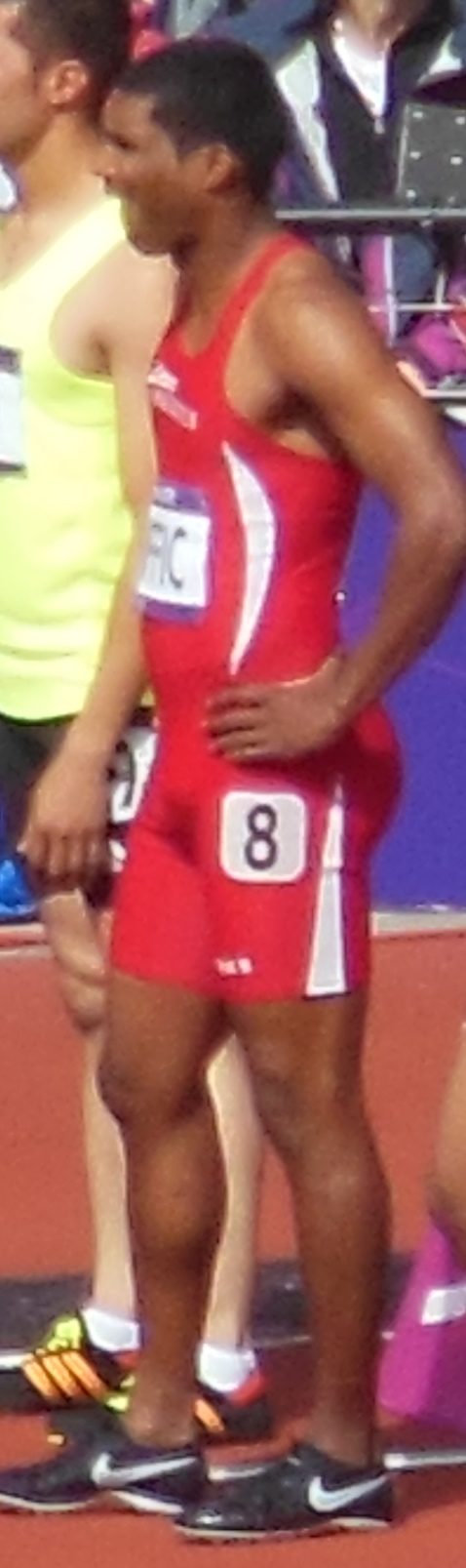
- Before the start of heat 4 of the 100 m at the 2012 Summer Olympics

Personal information
- Born: 25 August 1984 (age 41)
- Height: 1.68 m (5 ft 6 in)
- Weight: 73 kg (161 lb)

Sport
- Country: Mauritius
- Sport: Athletics
- Event: 100 metres
- Updated on 5 August 2012

Louis Steven Fabrice Coiffic is a Mauritian sprinter specializing in the 100 metres and 200 metres, who competed in the 2006 Commonwealth Games and 2006 African Championships in Athletics. Coiffic is the third fastest 200m sprinter in Mauritius with a time of 20.89 seconds behind Stephan Buckland's 20.06 seconds and Eric Milazar's 20.66 seconds achieved respectively in Paris, France and La Chaux-de-Fonds, Switzerland.

Fabrice Coiffic's rise to prominence in Mauritian athletics came in 2006 when he reached the final of the 200m at the 2006 African Championships in Athletics where he finished in fifth place. That same year, he participated at the 2006 Commonwealth Games where he reached the quarter final in the 200m race and achieving a new personal best of 20.99. In 2007, Coiffic became the second athlete after Stephan Buckland to win the 100m, the 200m and 4 × 100 m relay events at the Indian Ocean Island Games also known as the Jeux des Iles de L'ocean Indien, held in Antananarivo, Madagascar.

In 2008, Coiffic failed to reach the finals of the 100m and 200m at the African Athletics Championships held in Adds Ababa, Ethiopia. In 2009, Coiffic participated at the Francophone Games in Beirut, Lebanon where he came fourth the 200m final in a time of 20.99. He also won a silver medal with the Mauritian relay team in 39.60 seconds. Earlier that year, he achieved a personal best time 20.89 seconds at the Resisprint International Meeting in Switzerland thus making him the third fastest Mauritian sprinter in the half lap event. Furthermore, Coiffic achieved his personal best in the 100m event with a time of 10.45 which he ran on home soil at the Mauritian International Meeting. He ran 10.45 again at the Meeting National D2 Groupama Argentan in France.

In 2010, Coiffic participated at the 2010 African Championships in Athletics in Nairobi, Kenya, where he only reached the semifinal in both the 100m and 200m events with a time of 10.51 and 21.43. This poor performance was repeated at the 2010 Commonwealth Games in Delhi, India where the sprinter only reached the quarter final of the 200m in 21.19 seconds and also being eliminated in the first rounds of the 4 × 100 m relay. With the retirement of Stephan Buckland in July 2010, Coiffic was thought to be the sprinter who would put Mauritian back at the international level but has disappointed many Mauritians due to his poor performances at the 2010 African Championships in Athletics and the 2010 Commonwealth Games.

However, in 2011, Coiffic impressed many with his winning streak of three gold medals at the 2011 Indian Ocean Island Games, held in Mahe, Seychelles. At these games, Coiffic easily won the 100m in 10.59, the 200m in 21.19 and the 4 × 100 m relay in 40.49 thus, repeating his performance that he achieved four years ago in the 2007 Games. This makes him the only athlete in the history of the Games to win all three events two times consecutively. He thought of attempting to break the Games' record in the 200m which is 20.46 and was achieved in 2003 by Stephan Buckland, but that seemed to be too farfetched as he would have had to run close to his personal best of 20.89. Earlier in 2011 Coiffic participated in many athletics meetings in France where he took mostly second and third places in sprint events. His 2011 season best in the 100m is currently 10.58 seconds, a time he achieved at the Meeting National D1 Nant'Haies Atlantic in France, where he won the race.

== Personal Bests ==
Date	Event	Venue	Time (seconds)
10 February 2006	60 metres	Eaubonne, France	6.83
12 September 2011	100 metres	Maputo, Mozambique	10.40
28 June 2009	200 metres	La Chaux de Fonds, Switzerland	20.89

== Achievements in Athletics ==
Year	Meeting	Venue	Result	Event	Time
2001	IAAF World Youth Athletics Championships	Debrecen, Hungary	6th	100m Heat	11.55
2002	Championnats Nationaux Juniors KFC	Reduit, Mauritius	2nd	100m	10.88
2002	Championnats Nationaux Vital	Reduit, Mauritius	3rd	200m	22.75
2002	AAC Southern Region Junior Championships	South Africa	4th	100m	10.84
2002	AAC Southern Region Junior Championships	South Africa	1st	4 × 100 m	42.18
2003	Régionaux de la Réunion	St Paul, Réunion	1st	100m	10.95
2003	Régionaux de la Réunion	St Paul, Réunion	1st	200m Qualification	22.51
2003	Régionaux de la Réunion	St Paul, Réunion	1st	200m Final	22.19
2003	Meeting in Reduit	Reduit, Mauritius	1st	100m	10.80
2003	Championnats de Maurice Juniors	Reduit, Mauritius	1st	200m	22.09
2003	Championnats de Maurice Juniors	Reduit, Mauritius	2nd	100m	11.00
2003	Air Mauritius International Meeting	Reduit, Mauritius	4th	100m	11.18
2003	Lucozade Sport National Circuit 1st Tour	Reduit, Mauritius	2nd	100m	10.98
2003	Lucozade Sport National Circuit 1st Tour	Reduit, Mauritius	1st	200m	22.34
2003	Lucozade Sport National Circuit 2nd Tour	Reduit, Mauritius	1st	100m	10.60
2003	Lucozade Sport National Circuit 3rd Tour	Reduit, Mauritius	1st	200m	22.26
2003	Lucozade Sport National Circuit 5th Tour	Reduit, Mauritius	2nd	100m	10.85
2004	Lucozade Sport National Circuit	Reduit, Mauritius	2nd	100m	10.95
2004	Championnats Nationaux Vital	Reduit, Mauritius	2nd	100m	10.88
2005	Skyline International Meeting	Reduit, Mauritius	3rd	100m	10.69
2005	Meeting International de la ville de Brazzaville	Brazzaville, Congo	7th	100m	10.72
2005	Lucozade Sport National Circuit 1st Tour	Reduit, Mauritius	2nd	100m	10.61
2005	Lucozade Sport National Circuit 2nd Tour	Reduit, Mauritius	2nd	200m	21.48
2005	Lucozade Sport National Circuit 4th Tour	Reduit, Mauritius	2nd	200m	21.92
2005	Lucozade Sport National Circuit 4th Tour	Reduit, Mauritius	1st	4 × 100 m	41.85
2005	Open Events	Reduit, Mauritius	1st	100m	10.65
2005	Championnats Nationaux	Reduit, Mauritius	1st	100m	10.71
2005	Championnats Nationaux	Reduit, Mauritius	1st	200m	21.84
2006	Meeting Indoor du Val d'Oise d'Eaubonne	Eaubonne, France	4th	60m Qualification	6.83
2006	Lucozade Sport National Circuit	Reduit, Mauritius	1st	100m	10.58
2006	Mauritius International Meeting	Reduit, Mauritius	1st	100m	10.60
2006	Mauritius International Meeting	Reduit, Mauritius	2nd	200m	21.47
2006	African Athletics Championships	Bambous, Mauritius	1st	200 m Heat	21.57
2006	African Athletics Championships	Bambous, Mauritius	3rd	200 m Semifinal	21.15
2006	African Athletics Championships	Bambous, Mauritius	5th	200 m Final	21.14
2006	Commonwealth Games	Melbourne, Australia	3rd	200m Heat	20.99
2006	Commonwealth Games	Melbourne, Australia	5th	200m Semifinal	21.52
2006	Commonwealth Games	Melbourne, Australia	2nd	4 × 100 m Heat	39.55
2006	Commonwealth Games	Melbourne, Australia	4th	4 × 100 m Final	39.97
2007	Stellenbosch Yellow Pages Meeting	Stellenbosch, South Africa	8th	200 m	21.97
2007	Tshwane Yellow Pages Meeting	Tshwane, South Africa	8th	200 m	21.51
2007	Tshwane Yellow Pages Meeting	Tshwane, South Africa	8th	100 m	10.82
2007	Preparation Meeting	Reduit, Mauritius	1st	100m	10.60
2007	Preparation Meeting	Reduit, Mauritius	1st	100m	21.58
2007	5ème Meeting de Valbonne	Valbonne, France	1st	100m	10.63
2007	5ème Meeting de Valbonne	Valbonne, France	1st	200m	21.12
2007	Meeting Internazionale Citta di Avellino	Avellino, Italy	1st	200m	21.21
2007	Meeting Arcobaleno AtleticaEuropa	Celle Ligure, Italy	1st	100m	10.87
2007	Meeting Arcobaleno AtleticaEuropa	Celle Ligure, Italy	2nd	200m	21.29
2007	Mauritius International Meeting	Reduit, Mauritius	2nd	200m	21.60
2007	Mauritius International Meeting	Reduit, Mauritius	4th	100m	10.64
2007	Southern Africa Regional Permit Meeting	Gaborone, Botswana	3rd	100 m	10.69
2007	Southern Africa Regional Permit Meeting	Gaborone, Botswana	3rd	200 m	21.22
2007	Meeting Internazionale Citta di Avellino	Avellino, Italy	1st	200m	21.21
2007	Memorial Sven Gales	Luxembourg	4th	100m	10.54
2007	Memorial Sven Gales	Luxembourg	2nd	200m	21.40
2007	All-Africa Games	Algiers, Algeria	3rd	200 m Heat	21.16
2007	All-Africa Games	Algiers, Algeria	5th	200 m Semifinal	21.16
2007	All-Africa Games	Algiers, Algeria	5th	4 × 100 m Final	39.64
2007	Jeux des Iles de L'ocean Indien	Antannarivo, Madagascar	1st	100m Final	10.3h (hand timing)
2007	Jeux des Iles de L'ocean Indien	Antannarivo, Madagascar	1st	200 m Qualification	21.33
2007	Jeux des Iles de L'ocean Indien	Antannarivo, Madagascar	1st	200 m Final	20.8h (hand timing)
2008	Copenhagen Athletics Games	Copenhagen, Denmark	2nd	100m	10.58
2008	Mauritius International Meeting	Reduit, Mauritius	2nd	100m	10.53
2008	IAAF Grand Prix Dakar	Dakar, Senegal	7th	200m	21.63
2008	Meeting Internazionale Terra Sarda	Cagliari, Italy	3rd	200m	21.47
2008	Meeting CAA Bamako	Bamako, Mali	8th	100m	12.23
2008	Meeting CAA Bamako	Bamako, Mali	3rd	200m	21.26
2008	Meeting Internazionale Sport Solidarieta	Sabbiadoro, Italy	4th	200m	21.12
2008	Meeting national D2 de Marseille	Marseille, France	2nd	200m	21.23
2008	Meeting National d’Albertville Palmyrimmo	Albertville, France	3rd	200m	21.13
2008	Meeting International Dakar	Dakar, Senegal	2nd	200m	21.19
2008	African Athletics Championships	Addis Ababa, Ethiopia	4th	100 m Heat	10.57
2008	African Athletics Championships	Addis Ababa, Ethiopia	7th	100 m Semifinal	10.72
2008	African Athletics Championships	Addis Ababa, Ethiopia	3rd	200 m Heat	21.23
2009	Preparation Meeting	Reduit, Mauritius	1st	100m	10.50
2009	Mauritius International Meeting	Reduit, Mauritius	3rd	100m	10.45
2009	Mauritius International Meeting	Reduit, Mauritius	4th	200m	21.38
2009	Meeting National D1 de Metz	Metz, France	4th	100m	10.82
2009	Meeting National D2 Groupama Argentan	Argentan, France	2nd	100m Qualification	10.72
2009	Meeting National D2 Groupama Argentan	Argentan, France	1st	100m Final	10.45
2009	Meeting National D2 d'Amiens Métropole	Amiens, France	1st	200m	21.42
2009	Meeting du Val De Marne	Nogent-sur-Marne, France	1st	200m	21.33
2009	Tofalia International Meeting	Patras, Greece	1st	200m	21.02
2009	Circuit National Lucozade Sport	Reduit, Mauritius	1st	100m	10.65
2009	Circuit national Lucozade Sport	Reduit, Mauritius	1st	200m	21.58
2009	Meeting International Resisprint	La Chaux de Fonds, Switzerland	1st	100m	10.46
2009	Meeting International Resisprint	La Chaux de Fonds, Switzerland	2nd	200m	20.89 (PB)
2009	Francophone Games	Beirut, Lebanon	3rd	100m Heat	10.44
2009	Francophone Games	Beirut, Lebanon	4th	100m Semifinal	10.47
2009	Francophone Games	Beirut, Lebanon	1st	200m Heat	21.48
2009	Francophone Games	Beirut, Lebanon	2nd	200m Semifinal	21.22
2009	Francophone Games	Beirut, Lebanon	4th	200m Final	20.99
2009	Francophone Games	Beirut, Lebanon	2nd	4 × 100 m	39.60
2010	Preparation Meeting	Reduit, Mauritius	3rd	100m	10.76
2010	Yellow Pages Series IV	Johannesburg, South Africa	3rd	100m	10.66
2010	Meeting National D1 de Nantes	Nantes, France	4th	100m	10.61
2010	Meeting National D1 de Nantes	Nantes, France	5th	200m	21.54
2010	Championnats de Lorraine	Tomblaine, France	3rd	100m Qualification	10.85
2010	Championnats de Lorraine	Tomblaine, France	2nd	100m Final	10.57
2010	Meeting Pré France Nord-Est	Montbéliard, France	1st	200m Qualification	22.29
2010	Meeting Pré France Nord-Est	Montbéliard, France	2nd	200m Final	21.32
2010	Meeting Amiens Metropole	Amiens, France	1st	200m	21.29
2010	Meeting National D2 Bonneuil sur Marne	Bonneuil sur Marne, France	1st	100m	10.68
2010	Meeting National D2 Bonneuil sur Marne	Bonneuil sur Marne, France	2nd	200m	21.46
2010	Meeting Metz Moselle Athlelor	Metz, France	5th	200m	21.43
2010	Mauritius International Meeting	Reduit, Mauritius	3rd	100m	10.69
2010	Mauritius International Meeting	Reduit, Mauritius	5th	200m	21.54
2010	Lucozade Sport Grand Prix	Reduit, Mauritius	1st	100m	10.65
2010	Lucozade Sport Grand Prix	Reduit, Mauritius	1st	100m	21.45
2010	Meeting International Resisprint	La Chaux de Fonds, Switzerland	6th	100m Qualification	10.56
2010	Meeting International Resisprint	La Chaux de Fonds, Switzerland	6th	100m Final	10.68
2010	Meeting International Resisprint	La Chaux de Fonds, Switzerland	6th	200m	22.28
2010	African Athletics Championships	Nairobi, Kenya	2nd	100m Heat	10.59
2010	African Athletics Championships	Nairobi, Kenya	5th	100m Semifinal	10.51
2010	African Athletics Championships	Nairobi, Kenya	2nd	200m Heat	21.43
2010	African Athletics Championships	Nairobi, Kenya	7th	200m Semifinal	21.43
2010	African Athletics Championships	Nairobi, Kenya	3rd	4 × 100 m Heat	40.00
2010	African Athletics Championships	Nairobi, Kenya	5th	4 × 100 m Final	40.27
2010	Commonwealth Games	Delhi, India	3rd	200m Heat	21.45
2010	Commonwealth Games	Delhi, India	5th	200m Quarterfinal	21.19
2010	Commonwealth Games	Delhi, India	4th	4 × 100 m Heat	40.21
2011	Mauritius International Meeting	Reduit, Mauritius	6th	100m	10.72
2011	Mauritius International Meeting	Reduit, Mauritius	3rd	200m	21.25
2011	Mauritius International Meeting	Reduit, Mauritius	2nd	4 × 100 m	40.75
2011	Meeting International de St Denis	St Denis, Reunion	4th	100m	10.70
2011	Meeting National D2 de Bonneuil sur Marne	Bonneuil sur Marne, France	3rd	200m	21.58
2011	Meeting National D1 de Forbach	Forbach, France	2nd	100m Qualification	10.89
2011	Meeting National D1 de Forbach	Forbach, France	2nd	100m Final	10.76
2011	Meeting National D1 de Forbach	Forbach, France	2nd	200m	21.41
2011	Meeting National D2 d'Amiens Métropole	Amiens, France	1st	200m Qualification	22.46
2011	Meeting National D2 d'Amiens Métropole	Amiens, France	3rd	200m Final	21.69
2011	Meeting du Val de Marne	Nogent Sur Marne, France	2nd	200m	21.40
2011	Meeting National D1 Nant'Haies Atlantic	Nantes, France	1st	100m	10.58
2011	Meeting National D1 Nant'Haies Atlantic	Nantes, France	2nd	200m	21.49
2011	Meeting Pro Athlé Tour de Nancy	Tomblaine, France	8th	200m	21.87
2011	Championnats Ile-de-France Espoirs Seniors	Antony, France	1st	4 × 100 m	40.91
2011	Lucozade Sport Grand Prix Final	Reduit, Mauritius	3rd	100m	10.79
2011	Jeux des Iles de L'ocean Indien	Mahe, Seychelles	1st	100m Qualification	10.81
2011	Jeux des Iles de L'ocean Indien	Mahe, Seychelles	1st	100m Final	10.59
2011	Jeux des Iles de L'ocean Indien	Mahe, Seychelles	2nd	200m Qualification	22.15
2011	Jeux des Iles de L'ocean Indien	Mahe, Seychelles	1st	200m Final	21.19
2011	Jeux des Iles de L'ocean Indien	Mahe, Seychelles	1st	4 × 100 m Final	40.49
2011	All-Africa Games Athletics	Maputo, Mozambique	3rd	100m Heat	10.60h(hand timing)
2011	All-Africa Games Athletics	Maputo, Mozambique	5th	100m Semifinal	10.40 (PB)
2011	All-Africa Games Athletics	Maputo, Mozambique	5th	4 × 100 m Final	39.85
2011	All-Africa Games Athletics	Maputo, Mozambique	5th	200m Heat	21.53
2011	All-Africa Games Athletics	Maputo, Mozambique	4th	200m Semifinal	21.67
2012	Preparation Meeting	Reduit, Mauritius	4th	150m	16.20
2012	Meeting International de St Denis	St Denis, Reunion	3rd	100m	10.99
2012	Mauritius International Meeting	Bambous, Mauritius	5th	100m	10.70
2012	Meeting National de Forbach	Forbach, France	3rd	100m Qualification	10.85
2012	Meeting National de Forbach	Forbach, France	3rd	200m	21.81
2012	Meeting de Besançon	Besançon, France	3rd	200m	21.84
2012	Reunion Internacional De Atletismo Villa De Bilbao	Bilbao, Spain	2nd	100m Qualification	10.58
2012	Reunion Internacional De Atletismo Villa De Bilbao	Bilbao, Spain	3rd	100m Final	10.55
2012	Reunion Internacional De Atletismo Villa De Bilbao	Bilbao, Spain	4th	200m	21.59
2012	Meeting National d'Argentan	Argentan, France	1st	100m Qualification	10.68
2012	Meeting National d'Argentan	Argentan, France	3rd	100m Final	10.69
2012	Meeting International de Tunis	Rades, Tunis	3rd	200m	21.50
2012	African Athletics Championships	Porto Novo, Benin	4th	100 m Heat	10.63
2012	African Athletics Championships	Porto Novo, Benin	8th	100 m Semifinal	10.77
2012	African Athletics Championships	Porto Novo, Benin	5th	200 m Heat	21.32
2012	African Athletics Championships	Porto Novo, Benin	6th	200 m Semifinal	21.38
2012	Lucozade Sport Grand Prix (1st Edition)	Reduit, Mauritius	1st	100m	10.64
2012	Lucozade Sport Grand Prix (2nd Edition)	Reduit, Mauritius	2nd	200m	21.68
2012	Olympic Games of the XXX Olympiad	London, England	2nd	100m Preliminary Round	10.62
2012	Olympic Games of the XXX Olympiad	London, England	7th	100m Heat	10.59
2013	Mauritius International Meeting	Reduit, Mauritius	3rd	100m	10.55
2013	Mauritius International Meeting	Reduit, Mauritius	5th	200m	21.41
2013	Meeting International de St Denis	St Denis, Reunion	5th	100m	10.68
2013	Meeting International de St Denis	St Denis, Reunion	5th	200m	21.92
2013	Interclubs Nord-Est Brassage N1	Remiremont, France	1st	100m	10.50
2013	Interclubs Nord-Est Brassage N1	Remiremont, France	1st	4 × 100 m	43.13
2013	Championnats Nationaux Interclubs N1A Finale	Dijon, France	1st	100m	10.74
2013	Championnats Nationaux Interclubs N1A Finale	Dijon, France	3rd	4 × 100 m	42.43
2013	Meeting Elite de Forbach	Forbach, France	2nd	100m Qualification	10.87
2013	Meeting Elite de Forbach	Forbach, France	4th	100m Final	10.90
2013	Meeting Elite de Forbach	Forbach, France	5th	200m	22.01
2013	Vital National Circuit 1st Meeting	Reduit, Mauritius	1st	100m	10.51
2013	Vital National Circuit 1st Meeting	Reduit, Mauritius	2nd	200m	21.54
2013	Vital National Circuit 1st Meeting	Reduit, Mauritius	1st	4 × 100 m	41.00
2013	Vital National Circuit 2nd Meeting	Reduit, Mauritius	1st	100m	10.57
2013	Vital National Circuit 2nd Meeting	Reduit, Mauritius	1st	4 × 100 m	41.53
2013	Meeting National de Lillebonne	Lillebonne, France	1st	100m	10.78
2013	Meeting National de Lillebonne	Lillebonne, France	2nd	200m	21.58
2013	Meeting National de Romans	Romans, France	3rd	100m Qualification	11.00
2013	Meeting National de Romans	Romans, France	2nd	100m	10.69
2013	Meeting National d'Oyonnax	Oyonnax, France	3rd	100m Qualification	10.81
2013	Meeting National d'Oyonnax	Oyonnax, France	5th	100m Final	10.66
2013	Meeting National d'Oyonnax	Oyonnax, France	7th	200m	23.29
2013	Meeting National de Castres	Castres, France	Disqualified	100m	DQ
2013	Meeting National de Castres	Castres, France	4th	200m	21.17
2013	Championnats Nationaux	Aubagne, France	2nd	100m Qualification	10.53
2013	Championnats Nationaux	Aubagne, France	4th	100m Final	10.46
2013	Championnats de France Elite	Paris, France	7th	200m Qualification	25.77
2013	Preparation Meeting (17 August)	Bambous, Mauritius	1st	400m	50.01
2013	Preparation Meeting (25 August)	Bambous, Mauritius	1st	200m	21.73
2013	Preparation Meeting (25 August)	Bambous, Mauritius	2nd	4 × 100 m	42.10
2013	Jeux de la Francophonie	Nice, France	4th	200m Qualification	21.77
2014	Preparation Meeting (29 March)	Bambous, Mauritius	3rd	100m	10.94
2014	Mauritius International Meeting	Bambous, Mauritius	5th	100m	10.69
2014	Championnats Nationaux Interclubs N1	Montbeliard, France	1st	100m	10.88
2014	Championnats Nationaux Interclubs N1	Montbeliard, France	1st	4 × 100 m	41.72
2014	Championnats Nationaux Juniors KFC (Épreuves Ouvertes)	Bambous, Mauritius	3rd	100m	10.81
2014	Championnats Nationaux Seniors Vital	Bambous, Mauritius	3rd	100m Qualification	11.03
2014	Championnats Nationaux Seniors Vital	Bambous, Mauritius	3rd	100m Final	10.79
2014	Championnats Nationaux Seniors Vital	Bambous, Mauritius	3rd	200m	21.87
2015	Preparation Meeting	Reduit, Mauritius	1st	100m	10.64
2015	Preparation Meeting	Reduit, Mauritius	1st	100m	10.63
2015	Preparation Meeting	Reduit, Mauritius	1st	200m	21.53
2015	Mauritius International Meeting	Reduit, Mauritius	2nd	100m	10.48
2015	Mauritius International Meeting	Reduit, Mauritius	3rd	200m	21.63
2015	Meeting International de St Denis	St Denis, Reunion	3rd	100m	10.88
2015	Meeting International de St Denis	St Denis, Reunion	2nd	4 × 100 m	40.47
2015	Interclubs Nord-Est Brassage National	Colmar, France	1st	200m	21.88
2015	Interclubs Nord-Est Brassage National	Colmar, France	2nd	4 × 100 m	43.24
2015	Interclubs Nord-Est Brassage National	Colmar, France	12th	Long Jump	5.57m
2015	Meeting Pokal der Freundschaft	Diekirch, Luxembourg	2nd	100m	10.75
2015	Meeting Elite de Montgeron	Montgeron, France	4th	100m Qualification	10.92
2015	Championnats Nationaux Interclubs N1A	Pontoise, France	1st	100m	10.66
2015	Championnats Nationaux Interclubs N1A	Pontoise, France	3rd	4 × 100 m	41.90
2015	Championnats Nationaux KFC	Reduit, Mauritius	1st	200m	21.98
2015	Championnats d'Afrique Australe	Reduit, Mauritius	6th	100m Final	10.67
2015	Championnats d'Afrique Australe	Reduit, Mauritius	5th	4 × 100 m	42.58
2015	Vital National Championships	Reduit, Mauritius	1st	100m Qualification	10.58
2015	Vital National Championships	Reduit, Mauritius	1st	100m Final	10.51
2015	Vital National Championships	Reduit, Mauritius	2nd	200m Qualification	21.95
2015	Vital National Championships	Reduit, Mauritius	2nd	200m Final	21.44
2015	Vital National Championships	Reduit, Mauritius	DNF	4 × 100 m	DNF
2015	Jeux des Iles de L'ocean Indien	St Paul, Reunion	3rd	100m Qualification	11.44
2015	Jeux des Iles de L'ocean Indien	St Paul, Reunion	3rd	100m Final	10.67
2015	Jeux des Iles de L'ocean Indien	St Paul, Reunion	3rd	200m Qualification	21.84
2015	Jeux des Iles de L'ocean Indien	St Paul, Reunion	4th	200m Final	21.54
2015	Jeux des Iles de L'ocean Indien	St Paul, Reunion	1st	4 × 100 m Final	40.35
2015	All-Africa Athletics Games	Brazzaville, Congo	8th	100m Heat	10.73
2015	All-Africa Athletics Games	Brazzaville, Congo	3rd	4 × 100 m Qualification	40.02
2015	All-Africa Athletics Games	Brazzaville, Congo	6th	4 × 100 m Final	39.98
