= Innocent Bologo =

Burkinabé sprinter

Personal information
- Nationality: Burkinabé
- Born: 5 September 1989 (age 36)

Sport
- Sport: Track and field
- Event: 100 m

Innocent Wendyam Bologo est un athlète Burkinabé spécialiste des épreuves de Sprint (running), né le 5 septembre 1989. Il a participé aux Championnats du monde juniors d'athlétisme sur 200 metres en 2008 à Bydgoszcz en Pologne de même qu'aux Championnats du monde Séniors sur 100 metres à Moscou en 2013. 100 metres 2013 World Championships in Athletics.

== Informations ==
Disciplines 100 m, 200 m, 4 × 100 m Taille 1,78 m
