= Athletics at the 2006 Commonwealth Games – Men's 200 metres =

Men's 200 metres at the Commonwealth Games

The 200 metres at the 2006 Commonwealth Games as part of the athletics programme were held at the Melbourne Cricket Ground on Wednesday 22 March and Thursday 23 March 2006.

The top three runners in each of the initial eight heats automatically qualified for the second round. The next eight fastest runners from across the heats also qualified. Those 32 runners competed in 4 heats in the second round, with the top four runners from each heat qualifying for the semifinals. There were two semifinals, and only the top four from each heat advanced to the final.

== Records ==
| World Record | 19.32 s | Michael Johnson | USA | Atlanta, Georgia, United States | 1 August 1996 |
| Games Record | 19.97 s | Frankie Fredericks | NAM | Victoria, British Columbia, Canada | ?? August, 1994 |

== Medals ==
| Gold: | Silver: | Bronze: |
| Omar Brown, Jamaica | Stéphan Buckland, Mauritius | Chris Williams, Jamaica |

== Qualification ==
Going into the event, the top ten Commonwealth athletes as ranked by the International Association of Athletics Federations were:

| 13 March Rank | | Athlete | Nation | Games Result | 27 March Rank | |
| Comm. | World | Athlete | Nation | Games Result | Comm. | World |
|---|---|---|---|---|---|---|
| 1 | 4 | Chris Williams | Jamaica | Bronze | 1 | 4 |
| 2 | 5 | Usain Bolt | Jamaica | Did not compete | 3 | 6 |
| 3 | 7 | Stéphan Buckland | Mauritius | Silver | 2 | 5 |
| 4 | 9 | Aaron Armstrong | Trinidad and Tobago | 5th | 4 | 9 |
| 5 | 12 | Christian Malcolm | Wales | Did not compete | =5 | =12 |
| 6 | 13 | Daniel Batman | Australia | Semi-finalist | 8 | 15 |
| 7 | 14 | Marlon Devonish | England | Semi-finalist | 9 | 16 |
| 8 | 16 | Patrick Johnson | Australia | 4th | =5 | =12 |
| 9 | 17 | Omar Brown | Jamaica | Gold | =5 | =12 |
| 10 | 18 | Jaysuma Saidy Ndure | The Gambia | Semi-finalist | 11 | 19 |

== Results ==
All times shown are in seconds.

- Q denotes qualification by place in heat.
- q denotes qualification by overall place.
- DNS denotes did not start.
- DNF denotes did not finish.
- DQ denotes disqualification.
- NR denotes national record.
- GR denotes Games record.
- WR denotes world record.
- PB denotes personal best.
- SB denotes season best.

=== Round 1 ===
Heat 1 of 8 Date: Wednesday 22 March 2006 Time: ??:?? AM Wind: -0.2 m/s
| Place | | Athlete | Nation | Lane | Reaction | Time | Qual. | Record |
| Heat | Overall | Athlete | Nation | Lane | Reaction | Time | Qual. | Record |
|---|---|---|---|---|---|---|---|---|
| 1 | 3 | Jaysuma Saidy Ndure | The Gambia | 6 | 0.165 s | 20.64 s | Q | |
| 2 | 4 | Aaron Armstrong | Trinidad and Tobago | 5 | 0.182 s | 20.66 s | Q | |
| 3 | =17 | Fabrice Coiffic | Mauritius | 2 | 0.182 s | 20.99 s | Q | PB |
| 4 | =19 | Brendan Christian | Antigua and Barbuda | 7 | 0.238 s | 21.00 s | q | |
| 5 | 28 | Shiwantha Weerasuriya | Sri Lanka | 1 | 0.237 s | 21.41 s | q | |
| 6 | 30 | Sandy Walker | Sierra Leone | 8 | 0.185 s | 21.48 s | q | |
| 7 | =35 | Enote Inanga | Saint Kitts and Nevis | 4 | 0.220 s | 21.69 s | | |
| 8 | 48 | Ismail Saneem | Maldives | 3 | 0.238 s | 23.68 s | | PB |

Heat 2 of 8 Date: Wednesday 22 March 2006 Time: ??:?? AM Wind: +0.7 m/s
| Place | | Athlete | Nation | Lane | Reaction | Time | Qual. | Record |
| Heat | Overall | Athlete | Nation | Lane | Reaction | Time | Qual. | Record |
|---|---|---|---|---|---|---|---|---|
| 1 | 6 | Patrick Johnson | Australia | 3 | 0.186 s | 20.74 s | Q | |
| 2 | 15 | Sherwin Vries | South Africa | 5 | 0.212 s | 20.95 s | Q | |
| 3 | 16 | Seth Amoo | Ghana | 6 | 0.163 s | 20.95 s | Q | |
| 4 | 24 | Gibrilla Bangura | Sierra Leone | 2 | 0.135 s | 21.18 s | q | PB |
| 5 | =25 | Chris Lambert | England | 7 | 0.281 s | 21.20 s | q | |
| 6 | 33 | Evans Marie | Seychelles | 4 | 0.199 s | 21.66 s | | |
| 7 | 37 | Darian Forbes | Turks and Caicos Islands | 8 | 0.279 s | 21.72 s | | |
| 8 | 46 | Rabangaki Nawai | Kiribati | 1 | 0.174 s | 22.81 s | | NR |

Heat 3 of 8 Date: Wednesday 22 March 2006 Time: ??:?? AM Wind: +2.1 m/s
| Place | | Athlete | Nation | Lane | Reaction | Time | Qual. | Record |
| Heat | Overall | Athlete | Nation | Lane | Reaction | Time | Qual. | Record |
|---|---|---|---|---|---|---|---|---|
| 1 | 5 | Marlon Devonish | England | 3 | 0.199 s | 20.70 s | Q | |
| 2 | =12 | Ainsley Waugh | Jamaica | 7 | 0.190 s | 20.93 s | Q | |
| 3 | =19 | Julieon Raeburn | Trinidad and Tobago | 6 | 0.250 s | 21.00 s | Q | |
| 4 | 21 | Ambrose Ezenwa | Australia | 1 | 0.167 s | 21.10 s | q | |
| 5 | 22 | Jamial Rolle | (The Bahamas) Bahamas | 5 | 0.191 s | 21.12 s | q | |
| 6 | =31 | Alie Dady Bangura | Sierra Leone | 4 | 0.260 s | 21.54 s | | |
| - | - | Hitjivirue Kaanjuka | Namibia | 8 | 0.243 s | DSQ | | 163.3 |
| - | - | Mariuti Uan | Kiribati | 2 | | DNS | | |

Heat 4 of 8 Date: Wednesday 22 March 2006 Time: ??:?? AM Wind: +2.3 m/s
| Place | | Athlete | Nation | Lane | Reaction | Time | Qual. | Record |
| Heat | Overall | Athlete | Nation | Lane | Reaction | Time | Qual. | Record |
|---|---|---|---|---|---|---|---|---|
| 1 | 9 | Enefiok Udo-Obong | Nigeria | 2 | 0.153 s | 20.82 s | Q | |
| 2 | 11 | Kevon Pierre | Trinidad and Tobago | 1 | 0.214 s | 20.92 s | Q | |
| 3 | 14 | Darren Campbell | England | 4 | 0.208 s | 20.94 s | Q | |
| 4 | 45 | Nelson Kabitana | Solomon Islands | 3 | 0.224 s | 22.71 s | | |
| - | - | Robert Ibeh | Cayman Islands | 5 | 0.234 s | DSQ | | 163.3 |
| - | - | Delano Fulford | Turks and Caicos Islands | 7 | 0.321 s | DSQ | | 163.3 |
| - | - | Abraham Kepsen | Vanuatu | 8 | 0.266 s | DSQ | | 163.3 |
| - | - | Odingo Gordon | Montserrat | 6 | 0.220 s | DSQ | | 163.3 |

Heat 5 of 8 Date: Wednesday 22 March 2006 Time: ??:?? AM Wind: -0.3 m/s
| Place | | Athlete | Nation | Lane | Reaction | Time | Qual. | Record |
| Heat | Overall | Athlete | Nation | Lane | Reaction | Time | Qual. | Record |
|---|---|---|---|---|---|---|---|---|
| 1 | 7 | Leigh Julius | South Africa | 6 | 0.177 s | 20.80 s | Q | |
| 2 | 8 | Omar Brown | Jamaica | 7 | 0.281 s | 20.80 s | Q | |
| 3 | =31 | Isaac Jones | The Gambia | 1 | 0.255 s | 21.54 s | Q | PB |
| 4 | 38 | Ivan Miller | Antigua and Barbuda | 3 | 0.287 s | 21.80 s | | |
| 5 | =42 | Makame Machano | Tanzania | 5 | 0.281 s | 22.03 s | | |
| 6 | 44 | Andrew Doonar | Papua New Guinea | 4 | 0.205 s | 22.28 s | | |
| 7 | 47 | Robert Nidithawae | Vanuatu | 2 | 0.164 s | 23.42 s | | |
| - | - | Stephen Antoine Ovar Johnson | Cayman Islands | 8 | 0.155 s | DSQ | | 163.3 |

Heat 6 of 8 Date: Wednesday 22 March 2006 Time: ??:?? AM Wind: -0.6 m/s
| Place | | Athlete | Nation | Lane | Reaction | Time | Qual. | Record |
| Heat | Overall | Athlete | Nation | Lane | Reaction | Time | Qual. | Record |
|---|---|---|---|---|---|---|---|---|
| 1 | 10 | Daniel Batman | Australia | 3 | 0.185 s | 20.86 s | Q | |
| 2 | =12 | James Dolphin | New Zealand | 6 | 0.160 s | 20.93 s | Q | |
| 3 | 23 | Hank Palmer | Canada | 8 | 0.173 s | 21.15 s | Q | |
| 4 | 34 | Iliesa Namosimalua | Fiji | 2 | 0.218 s | 21.68 s | | |
| 5 | 40 | Fabian Niulai | Papua New Guinea | 1 | 0.229 s | 21.85 s | | |
| 6 | =42 | Michael Henry | Montserrat | 5 | 0.222 s | 22.03 s | | PB |
| 7 | 50 | Mohamed Asim | Maldives | 4 | 0.195 s | 26.48 s | | |
| - | - | Troy McIntosh | (The Bahamas) Bahamas | 7 | | DNF | | |

Heat 7 of 8 Date: Wednesday 22 March 2006 Time: ??:?? AM Wind: +0.4 m/s
| Place | | Athlete | Nation | Lane | Reaction | Time | Qual. | Record |
| Heat | Overall | Athlete | Nation | Lane | Reaction | Time | Qual. | Record |
|---|---|---|---|---|---|---|---|---|
| 1 | 1 | Chris Williams | Jamaica | 3 | 0.186 s | 20.49 s | Q | |
| 2 | 2 | Stéphan Buckland | Mauritius | 5 | 0.286 s | 20.56 s | Q | |
| 3 | =17 | Dominic Demeritte | (The Bahamas) Bahamas | 4 | 0.184 s | 20.99 s | Q | |
| 4 | 29 | François Belinga | Cameroon | 1 | 0.185 s | 21.46 s | q | |
| 5 | =35 | Navitalai Naivalu | Fiji | 6 | 0.215 s | 21.69 s | | |
| 6 | 49 | Ikbarry White | Montserrat | 2 | 0.197 s | 23.74 s | | |
| - | - | Clement Agyeman | Ghana | 7 | 0.288 s | DSQ | | 163.3 |

Heat 8 of 8 Date: Wednesday 22 March 2006 Time: ??:?? AM Wind: -0.4 m/s
| Place | | Athlete | Nation | Lane | Reaction | Time | Qual. | Record |
| Heat | Overall | Athlete | Nation | Lane | Reaction | Time | Qual. | Record |
|---|---|---|---|---|---|---|---|---|
| 1 | =25 | Uchenna Emedolu | Nigeria | 4 | 0.207 s | 21.20 s | Q | |
| 2 | 27 | Snyman Prinsloo | South Africa | 6 | 0.168 s | 21.40 s | Q | |
| 3 | 39 | Dion Crabbe | British Virgin Islands | 7 | 0.213 s | 21.82 s | Q | |
| 4 | 41 | Jayson Jones | Belize | 3 | 0.164 s | 21.93 s | | |
| - | - | Toom Annaua | Kiribati | 8 | 0.277 s | DSQ | | 163.3 |
| - | - | Joseph Batangdon | Cameroon | 2 | | DNS | | |
| - | - | Casnel Bushay | Saint Vincent and the Grenadines | 1 | | DNS | | |
| - | - | Justin Duahsaeed | Ghana | 5 | | DNS | | |

Round 1 overall results
| Place | Athlete | Nation | Heat | Lane | Place | Wind | Time | Qual. | Record |
|---|---|---|---|---|---|---|---|---|---|
| 1 | Chris Williams | Jamaica | 7 | 3 | 1 | +0.4 | 20.49 s | Q | |
| 2 | Stéphan Buckland | Mauritius | 7 | 5 | 2 | +0.4 | 20.56 s | Q | |
| 3 | Jaysuma Saidy Ndure | The Gambia | 1 | 6 | 1 | -0.2 | 20.64 s | Q | |
| 4 | Aaron Armstrong | Trinidad and Tobago | 1 | 5 | 2 | -0.2 | 20.66 s | Q | |
| 5 | Marlon Devonish | England | 3 | 3 | 1 | +2.1 | 20.70 s | Q | |
| 6 | Patrick Johnson | Australia | 2 | 3 | 1 | +0.7 | 20.74 s | Q | |
| 7 | Leigh Julius | South Africa | 5 | 6 | 1 | -0.3 | 20.80 s | Q | |
| 8 | Omar Brown | Jamaica | 5 | 7 | 2 | -0.3 | 20.80 s | Q | |
| 9 | Enefiok Udo-Obong | Nigeria | 4 | 2 | 1 | +2.3 | 20.82 s | Q | |
| 10 | Daniel Batman | Australia | 6 | 3 | 1 | -0.6 | 20.86 s | Q | |
| 11 | Kevon Pierre | Trinidad and Tobago | 4 | 1 | 2 | +2.3 | 20.92 s | Q | |
| 12 | James Dolphin | New Zealand | 6 | 6 | 2 | -0.6 | 20.93 s | Q | |
| 12 | Ainsley Waugh | Jamaica | 3 | 7 | 2 | +2.1 | 20.93 s | Q | |
| 14 | Darren Campbell | England | 4 | 4 | 3 | +2.3 | 20.94 s | Q | |
| 15 | Sherwin Vries | South Africa | 2 | 5 | 2 | +0.7 | 20.95 s | Q | |
| 16 | Seth Amoo | Ghana | 2 | 6 | 3 | +0.7 | 20.95 s | Q | |
| 17 | Fabrice Coiffic | Mauritius | 1 | 2 | 3 | -0.2 | 20.99 s | Q | PB |
| 17 | Dominic Demeritte | (The Bahamas) Bahamas | 7 | 4 | 3 | +0.4 | 20.99 s | Q | |
| 19 | Brendan Christian | Antigua and Barbuda | 1 | 7 | 4 | -0.2 | 21.00 s | q | |
| 19 | Julieon Raeburn | Trinidad and Tobago | 3 | 6 | 3 | +2.1 | 21.00 s | Q | |
| 21 | Ambrose Ezenwa | Australia | 3 | 1 | 4 | +2.1 | 21.10 s | q | |
| 22 | Jamial Rolle | (The Bahamas) Bahamas | 3 | 5 | 5 | +2.1 | 21.12 s | q | |
| 23 | Hank Palmer | Canada | 6 | 8 | 3 | -0.6 | 21.15 s | Q | |
| 24 | Gibrilla Bangura | Sierra Leone | 2 | 2 | 4 | +0.7 | 21.18 s | q | PB |
| 25 | Uchenna Emedolu | Nigeria | 8 | 4 | 1 | -0.4 | 21.20 s | Q | |
| 25 | Chris Lambert | England | 2 | 7 | 5 | +0.7 | 21.20 s | q | |
| 27 | Snyman Prinsloo | South Africa | 8 | 6 | 2 | -0.4 | 21.40 s | Q | |
| 28 | Shiwantha Weerasuriya | Sri Lanka | 1 | 1 | 5 | -0.2 | 21.41 s | q | |
| 29 | François Belinga | Cameroon | 7 | 1 | 4 | +0.4 | 21.46 s | q | |
| 30 | Sandy Walker | Sierra Leone | 1 | 8 | 6 | +0.4 | 21.48 | q | |
| 31 | Alie Dady Bangura | Sierra Leone | 3 | 4 | 6 | +2.1 | 21.54 | | |
| 31 | Isaac Jones | The Gambia | 5 | 1 | 3 | -0.3 | 21.54 s | Q | PB |
| 33 | Evans Marie | Seychelles | 2 | 4 | 6 | +0.7 | 21.66 s | | |
| 34 | Iliesa Namosimalua | Fiji | 6 | 2 | 4 | -0.6 | 21.68 s | | |
| 35 | Enote Inanga | Saint Kitts and Nevis | 1 | 4 | 7 | -0.2 | 21.69 s | | |
| 35 | Navitalai Naivalu | Fiji | 7 | 6 | 5 | +0.4 | 21.69 s | | |
| 37 | Darian Forbes | Turks and Caicos Islands | 2 | 8 | 7 | +0.7 | 21.72 s | | |
| 38 | Ivan Miller | Antigua and Barbuda | 5 | 3 | 4 | -0.3 | 21.80 s | | |
| 39 | Dion Crabbe | British Virgin Islands | 8 | 7 | 3 | -0.4 | 21.82 s | Q | |
| 40 | Fabian Niulai | Papua New Guinea | 6 | 1 | 5 | -0.6 | 21.85 s | | |
| 41 | Jayson Jones | Belize | 8 | 3 | 4 | -0.4 | 21.93 s | | |
| 42 | Michael Henry | Montserrat | 6 | 5 | 6 | -0.6 | 22.03 s | | PB |
| 42 | Makame Machano | Tanzania | 5 | 5 | 5 | -0.3 | 22.03 s | | |
| 44 | Delano Fulford | Turks and Caicos Islands | 5 | 4 | 6 | -0.3 | 22.28 s | | |
| 45 | Nelson Kabitana | Solomon Islands | 4 | 3 | 4 | +2.3 | 22.71 s | | |
| 46 | Rabangaki Nawai | Kiribati | 2 | 1 | 8 | +0.7 | 22.81 s | | NR |
| 47 | Robert Nidithawae | Vanuatu | 5 | 2 | 7 | -0.3 | 23.42 s | | |
| 48 | Ismail Saneem | Maldives | 1 | 3 | 8 | -0.2 | 23.68 s | | PB |
| 49 | Ikbarry White | Montserrat | 7 | 2 | 6 | +0.4 | 23.74 s | | |
| 50 | Mohamed Asim | Maldives | 6 | 4 | 7 | -0.6 | 26.48 s | | |
| - | Troy McIntosh | (The Bahamas) Bahamas | 6 | 7 | - | -0.6 | DNF | | |
| - | Robert Ibeh | Cayman Islands | 4 | 5 | - | +2.3 | DSQ | | 163.3 |
| - | Clement Agyeman | Ghana | 7 | 7 | - | +0.4 | DSQ | | 163.3 |
| - | Stephen Antoine Ovar Johnson | Cayman Islands | 5 | 8 | - | -0.3 | DSQ | | 163.3 |
| - | Hitjivirue Kaanjuka | Namibia | 3 | 8 | - | +2.1 | DSQ | | 163.3 |
| - | Delano Fulford | Turks and Caicos Islands | 4 | 7 | - | +2.3 | DSQ | | 163.3 |
| - | Abraham Kepsen | Vanuatu | 4 | 8 | - | +2.3 | DSQ | | 163.3 |
| - | Odingo Gordon | Montserrat | 4 | 6 | - | +2.3 | DSQ | | 163.3 |
| - | Toom Annaua | Kiribati | 8 | 8 | - | -0.4 | DSQ | | 163.3 |
| - | Joseph Batangdon | Cameroon | 8 | 2 | - | -0.4 | DNS | | |
| - | Casnel Bushay | Saint Vincent and the Grenadines | 8 | 1 | - | -0.4 | DNS | | |
| - | Justin Duahsaeed | Ghana | 8 | 5 | - | -0.4 | DNS | | |
| - | Mariuti Uan | Kiribati | 3 | 2 | - | +2.1 | DNS | | |

=== Round 2 ===
Heat 1 of 4 Date: Wednesday 22 March 2006 Time: ??:?? AM Wind: +0.6 m/s
| Place | | Athlete | Nation | Lane | Reaction | Time | Qual. | Record |
| Heat | Overall | Athlete | Nation | Lane | Reaction | Time | Qual. | Record |
|---|---|---|---|---|---|---|---|---|
| 1 | 1 | Chris Williams | Jamaica | 3 | 0.186 s | 20.48 s | Q | |
| 2 | 2 | Stéphan Buckland | Mauritius | 5 | 0.187 s | 20.54 s | Q | |
| 3 | 9 | Uchenna Emedolu | Nigeria | 6 | 0.177 s | 20.77 s | Q | |
| 4 | 14 | Brendan Christian | Antigua and Barbuda | 7 | 0.189 s | 20.98 s | q | |
| 5 | 17 | Snyman Prinsloo | South Africa | 4 | 0.169 s | 21.05 s | | |
| 6 | 26 | Isaac Jones | The Gambia | 2 | 0.245 s | 21.78 s | | |
| 7 | 28 | Sandy Walker | Sierra Leone | 1 | 0.126 s | 21.96 s | | |
| - | - | Darren Campbell | England | 8 | 0.175 s | DSQ | | 163.3 |

Heat 2 of 4 Date: Wednesday 22 March 2006 Time: ??:?? AM Wind: -0.6 m/s
| Place | | Athlete | Nation | Lane | Reaction | Time | Qual. | Record |
| Heat | Overall | Athlete | Nation | Lane | Reaction | Time | Qual. | Record |
|---|---|---|---|---|---|---|---|---|
| 1 | 3 | Omar Brown | Jamaica | 4 | 0.147 s | 20.58 s | Q | |
| 2 | =6 | Jaysuma Saidy Ndure | The Gambia | 5 | 0.158 s | 20.74 s | Q | |
| 3 | 10 | Aaron Armstrong | Trinidad and Tobago | 6 | 0.172 s | 20.78 s | Q | |
| 4 | 12 | Ambrose Ezenwa | Australia | 7 | 0.167 s | 20.87 s | q | |
| 5 | 16 | Seth Amoo | Ghana | 1 | 0.172 s | 21.04 s | q | |
| 6 | 18 | Sherwin Vries | South Africa | 3 | 0.170 s | 21.13 s | | |
| 7 | 24 | François Belinga | Cameroon | 8 | 0.175 s | 21.67 s | | |
| - | - | Dion Crabbe | British Virgin Islands | 2 | | DNS | | |

Heat 3 of 4 Date: Wednesday 22 March 2006 Time: ??:?? AM Wind: +0.2 m/s
| Place | | Athlete | Nation | Lane | Reaction | Time | Qual. | Record |
| Heat | Overall | Athlete | Nation | Lane | Reaction | Time | Qual. | Record |
|---|---|---|---|---|---|---|---|---|
| 1 | 5 | Enefiok Udo-Obong | Nigeria | 3 | 0.188 s | 20.67 s | Q | PB |
| 2 | =6 | Daniel Batman | Australia | 5 | 0.180 s | 20.74 s | Q | |
| 3 | 8 | Marlon Devonish | England | 4 | 0.138 s | 20.76 s | Q | |
| 4 | 15 | Ainsley Waugh | Jamaica | 6 | 0.182 s | 21.03 s | q | |
| 5 | 19 | Hank Palmer | Canada | 8 | 0.220 s | 21.26 s | | |
| 6 | 20 | Jamial Rolle | (The Bahamas) Bahamas | 2 | 0.158 s | 21.33 s | | |
| 7 | 21 | Julieon Raeburn | Trinidad and Tobago | 1 | 0.212 s | 21.35 s | | |
| 8 | 25 | Shiwantha Weerasuriya | Sri Lanka | 7 | 0.266 s | 21.68 s | | |

Heat 4 of 4 Date: Wednesday 22 March 2006 Time: ??:?? AM Wind: -0.5 m/s
| Place | | Athlete | Nation | Lane | Reaction | Time | Qual. | Record |
| Heat | Overall | Athlete | Nation | Lane | Reaction | Time | Qual. | Record |
|---|---|---|---|---|---|---|---|---|
| 1 | 4 | Patrick Johnson | Australia | 6 | 0.153 s | 20.64 s | Q | |
| 2 | 11 | James Dolphin | New Zealand | 3 | 0.158 s | 20.80 s | Q | |
| 3 | 13 | Leigh Julius | South Africa | 4 | 0.149 s | 20.92 s | Q | |
| 4 | 22 | Kevon Pierre | Trinidad and Tobago | 5 | 0.175 s | 21.36 s | | |
| 5 | 23 | Fabrice Coiffic | Mauritius | 2 | 0.206 s | 21.52 s | | |
| 6 | 27 | Gibrilla Bangura | Sierra Leone | 1 | 0.163 s | 21.84 s | | |
| - | - | Dominic Demeritte | (The Bahamas) Bahamas | 8 | 0.140 s | DSQ | | 163.3 |
| - | - | Chris Lambert | England | 7 | | DNS | | |

Round 2 overall results
| Place | Athlete | Nation | Heat | Lane | Place | Wind | Time | Qual. | Record |
|---|---|---|---|---|---|---|---|---|---|
| 1 | Chris Williams | Jamaica | 1 | 3 | 1 | +0.6 | 20.48 s | Q | |
| 2 | Stéphan Buckland | Mauritius | 1 | 5 | 2 | +0.6 | 20.54 s | Q | |
| 3 | Omar Brown | Jamaica | 2 | 4 | 1 | -0.6 | 20.58 s | Q | |
| 4 | Patrick Johnson | Australia | 4 | 6 | 1 | -0.5 | 20.64 s | Q | |
| 5 | Enefiok Udo-Obong | Nigeria | 3 | 3 | 1 | +0.2 | 20.67 s | Q | PB |
| 6 | Daniel Batman | Australia | 3 | 5 | 2 | +0.2 | 20.74 s | Q | |
| 6 | Jaysuma Saidy Ndure | The Gambia | 2 | 5 | 2 | -0.6 | 20.74 s | Q | |
| 8 | Marlon Devonish | England | 3 | 4 | 3 | +0.2 | 20.76 s | Q | |
| 9 | Uchenna Emedolu | Nigeria | 1 | 6 | 3 | +0.6 | 20.77 s | Q | |
| 10 | Aaron Armstrong | Trinidad and Tobago | 2 | 6 | 3 | -0.6 | 20.78 s | Q | |
| 11 | James Dolphin | New Zealand | 4 | 3 | 2 | -0.5 | 20.80 s | Q | |
| 12 | Ambrose Ezenwa | Australia | 2 | 7 | 4 | -0.6 | 20.87 s | q | |
| 13 | Leigh Julius | South Africa | 4 | 4 | 3 | -0.5 | 20.92 s | Q | |
| 14 | Brendan Christian | Antigua and Barbuda | 1 | 7 | 4 | +0.6 | 20.98 s | q | |
| 15 | Ainsley Waugh | Jamaica | 3 | 6 | 4 | +0.2 | 21.03 s | q | |
| 16 | Seth Amoo | Ghana | 2 | 1 | 5 | -0.6 | 21.04 s | q | |
| 17 | Snyman Prinsloo | South Africa | 1 | 4 | 5 | +0.6 | 21.05 s | | |
| 18 | Sherwin Vries | South Africa | 2 | 3 | 6 | -0.6 | 21.13 s | | |
| 19 | Hank Palmer | Canada | 3 | 8 | 5 | +0.2 | 21.26 s | | |
| 20 | Jamial Rolle | (The Bahamas) Bahamas | 3 | 2 | 6 | +0.2 | 21.33 s | | |
| 21 | Julieon Raeburn | Trinidad and Tobago | 3 | 1 | 7 | +0.2 | 21.35 s | | |
| 22 | Kevon Pierre | Trinidad and Tobago | 4 | 5 | 4 | -0.5 | 21.36 s | | |
| 23 | Fabrice Coiffic | Mauritius | 4 | 2 | 5 | -0.5 | 21.52 s | | |
| 24 | François Belinga | Cameroon | 2 | 8 | 7 | -0.6 | 21.67 s | | |
| 25 | Shiwantha Weerasuriya | Sri Lanka | 3 | 7 | 8 | +0.2 | 21.68 s | | |
| 26 | Isaac Jones | The Gambia | 1 | 2 | 6 | +0.6 | 21.78 s | | |
| 27 | Gibrilla Bangura | Sierra Leone | 4 | 1 | 6 | -0.5 | 21.84 s | | |
| 28 | Sandy Walker | Sierra Leone | 1 | 1 | 7 | +0.6 | 21.96 s | | |
| - | Dominic Demeritte | (The Bahamas) Bahamas | 4 | 8 | - | -0.5 | DSQ | | 163.3 |
| - | Darren Campbell | England | 1 | 8 | - | +0.6 | DSQ | | 163.3 |
| - | Dion Crabbe | British Virgin Islands | 2 | 2 | - | -0.6 | DNS | | |
| - | Chris Lambert | England | 4 | 7 | - | -0.5 | DNS | | |

=== Semi-finals ===
Semi-final 1 Date: Thursday 23 March 2006 Time: ??:?? PM Wind: +1.0 m/s
| Place | | Athlete | Nation | Lane | Reaction | Time | Qual. | Record |
| Heat | Overall | Athlete | Nation | Lane | Reaction | Time | Qual. | Record |
|---|---|---|---|---|---|---|---|---|
| 1 | 1 | Omar Brown | Jamaica | 6 | 0.156 s | 20.49 s | Q | |
| 2 | 2 | Aaron Armstrong | Trinidad and Tobago | 8 | 0.168 s | 20.59 s | Q | |
| 3 | =3 | Patrick Johnson | Australia | 3 | 0.206 s | 20.63 s | Q | |
| 4 | 5 | Uchenna Emedolu | Nigeria | 7 | 0.166 s | 20.66 s | Q | |
| 5 | 6 | Jaysuma Saidy Ndure | The Gambia | 4 | 0.161 s | 20.70 s | | |
| 6 | 11 | Daniel Batman | Australia | 5 | 0.163 s | 20.90 s | | |
| 7 | 14 | Brendan Christian | Antigua and Barbuda | 1 | 0.156 s | 21.10 s | | |
| 8 | 15 | Ainsley Waugh | Jamaica | 2 | 0.172 s | 21.15 s | | |

Semi-final 2 Date: Thursday 23 March 2006 Time: ??:?? PM Wind: +1.7 m/s
| Place | | Athlete | Nation | Lane | Reaction | Time | Qual. | Record |
| Heat | Overall | Athlete | Nation | Lane | Reaction | Time | Qual. | Record |
|---|---|---|---|---|---|---|---|---|
| 1 | 3 | Stéphan Buckland | Mauritius | 6 | 0.199 s | 20.63 s | Q | |
| 2 | 7 | Enefiok Udo-Obong | Nigeria | 3 | 0.168 s | 20.72 s | Q | |
| 3 | 8 | James Dolphin | New Zealand | 4 | 0.211 s | 20.73 s | Q | |
| 4 | 9 | Chris Williams | Jamaica | 5 | 0.183 s | 20.73 s | Q | |
| 5 | 10 | Leigh Julius | South Africa | 8 | 0.154 s | 20.86 s | | |
| 6 | 12 | Marlon Devonish | England | 1 | 0.153 s | 20.93 s | | |
| 7 | 13 | Ambrose Ezenwa | Australia | 2 | 0.165 s | 20.97 s | | |
| 8 | 16 | Seth Amoo | Ghana | 7 | 0.269 s | 21.19 s | | |

Semi-finals overall results
| Place | Athlete | Nation | Heat | Lane | Place | Wind | Time | Qual. | Record |
|---|---|---|---|---|---|---|---|---|---|
| 1 | Omar Brown | Jamaica | 1 | 6 | 1 | +1.0 | 20.49 s | Q | |
| 2 | Aaron Armstrong | Trinidad and Tobago | 1 | 8 | 2 | +1.0 | 20.59 s | Q | |
| 3 | Stéphan Buckland | Mauritius | 2 | 6 | 1 | +1.7 | 20.63 s | Q | |
| 3 | Patrick Johnson | Australia | 1 | 3 | 3 | +1.0 | 20.63 s | Q | |
| 5 | Uchenna Emedolu | Nigeria | 1 | 7 | 4 | +1.0 | 20.66 s | Q | |
| 6 | Jaysuma Saidy Ndure | The Gambia | 1 | 4 | 5 | +1.0 | 20.70 s | | |
| 7 | Enefiok Udo-Obong | Nigeria | 2 | 3 | 2 | +1.7 | 20.72 s | Q | |
| 8 | James Dolphin | New Zealand | 2 | 4 | 3 | +1.7 | 20.73 s | Q | |
| 9 | Chris Williams | Jamaica | 2 | 5 | 4 | +1.7 | 20.73 s | Q | |
| 10 | Leigh Julius | South Africa | 2 | 8 | 5 | +1.7 | 20.86 s | | |
| 11 | Daniel Batman | Australia | 1 | 5 | 6 | +1.0 | 20.90 s | | |
| 12 | Marlon Devonish | England | 2 | 1 | 6 | +1.7 | 20.93 s | | |
| 13 | Ambrose Ezenwa | Australia | 2 | 2 | 7 | +1.7 | 20.97 s | | |
| 14 | Brendan Christian | Antigua and Barbuda | 1 | 1 | 7 | +1.0 | 21.10 s | | |
| 15 | Ainsley Waugh | Jamaica | 1 | 2 | 8 | +1.0 | 21.15 s | | |
| 16 | Seth Amoo | Ghana | 2 | 7 | 8 | +1.7 | 21.19 s | | |

=== Final ===
Final Date: Thursday 23 March 2006 Time: ??:?? PM Wind: +0.5 m/s
| Place | Athlete | Nation | Lane | Reaction | Time | Record |
|---|---|---|---|---|---|---|
| 1 | Omar Brown | Jamaica | 5 | 0.155 s | 20.47 s | |
| 2 | Stéphan Buckland | Mauritius | 3 | 0.182 s | 20.47 s | |
| 3 | Chris Williams | Jamaica | 7 | 0.205 s | 20.52 s | |
| 4 | Patrick Johnson | Australia | 2 | 0.165 s | 20.59 s | |
| 5 | Aaron Armstrong | Trinidad and Tobago | 4 | 0.172 s | 20.61 s | |
| 6 | Uchenna Emedolu | Nigeria | 8 | 0.190 s | 20.66 s | |
| 7 | Enefiok Udo-Obong | Nigeria | 6 | 0.154 s | 20.69 s | |
| 8 | James Dolphin | New Zealand | 1 | 0.145 s | 20.72 s | |
