= 2003 World Championships in Athletics – Men's 200 metres =

Men's athletic event

Men's 200 metres at the 2003 World Championships
- Venue: Stade de France
- Dates: 24 August (heats and quarter-finals); 25 August (semi-finals and final)
- Competitors: 59
- Winning time: 20.30

Medalists
gold medal	John Capel	United States
silver medal	Darvis Patton	United States
bronze medal	Shingo Suetsugu	Japan

These are the official results of the Men's 200 metres event at the 2003 IAAF World Championships in Paris, France. There were a total number of 59 participating athletes, with eight qualifying heats, four quarter-finals, two semi-finals and the final held on Friday 29 August 2003 at 21:00h. The winning margin was 0.01 seconds.

On August 27, Troy Douglas, at 40 years, 270 days old, became the oldest ever competitor for the men's 200 m. Two days later, Frank Fredericks became the oldest finalist in the distance, at 35 years, 331 days old.

== Final ==
RANK	FINAL	TIME
	John Capel (USA)	20.30
	Darvis Patton (USA)	20.31
	Shingo Suetsugu (JPN)	20.38
4.	Darren Campbell (GBR)	20.39
5.	Stéphane Buckland (MRI)	20.41
6.	Joshua J. Johnson (USA)	20.47
7.	Frank Fredericks (NAM)	20.47
8.	Uchenna Emedolu (NGR)	20.62

== Semi-final ==
- Held on Thursday 28 August 2003

RANK	HEAT 1	TIME
1.	Darvis Patton (USA)	20.03
2.	Stéphane Buckland (MRI)	20.11
3.	Frank Fredericks (NAM)	20.29
4.	Joshua J. Johnson (USA)	20.36
5.	Christian Malcolm (GBR)	20.43
6.	Marcin Jędrusiński (POL)	20.48
7.	Hamed Hamadan Al-Bishi (KSA)	20.70
8.	Dominic Demeritte (BAH)	20.71

RANK	HEAT 2	TIME
1.	John Capel (USA)	20.18
2.	Shingo Suetsugu (JPN)	20.22
3.	Darren Campbell (GBR)	20.34
4.	Uchenna Emedolu (NGR)	20.44
5.	Ricardo Williams (JAM)	20.45
6.	Sherwin Vries (RSA)	20.59
7.	Alessandro Cavallaro (ITA)	20.59
8.	Johan Wissman (SWE)	20.66

== Quarter-finals ==
- Held on Wednesday 27 August 2003

RANK	HEAT 1	TIME
1.	Shingo Suetsugu (JPN)	20.24
2.	Dominic Demeritte (BAH)	20.51
3.	Ricardo Williams (JAM)	20.53
4.	Johan Wissman (SWE)	20.59
5.	Oumar Loum (SEN)	20.67
6.	Issa-Aimé Nthépé (FRA)	20.69
7.	Marcin Urbaś (POL)	20.72
8.	Joseph Batangdon (CMR)	20.81

RANK	HEAT 2	TIME
1.	Darvis Patton (USA)	20.40
2.	Alessandro Cavallaro (ITA)	20.47
3.	Christian Malcolm (GBR)	20.58
4.	Hamed Hamadan Al-Bishi (KSA)	20.74
5.	Christopher Williams (JAM)	20.79
6.	Cláudio Roberto Sousa (BRA)	20.82
7.	Patrick Johnson (AUS)	20.83
8.	James Dolphin (NZL)	21.08

RANK	HEAT 3	TIME
1.	Stéphane Buckland (MRI)	20.06
2.	Joshua J. Johnson (USA)	20.22
3.	Uchenna Emedolu (NGR)	20.56
4.	Sherwin Vries (RSA)	20.59
5.	Troy Douglas (NED)	20.64
6.	Hisashi Miyazaki (JPN)	20.70
7.	Panagiotis Sarris (GRE)	20.74
8.	Julian Golding (GBR)	20.79

RANK	HEAT 4	TIME
1.	John Capel (USA)	20.30
2.	Darren Campbell (GBR)	20.35
3.	Frank Fredericks (NAM)	20.49
4.	Marcin Jędrusiński (POL)	20.53
5.	Paul Brizzel (IRL)	20.56
6.	Anastásios Goúsis (GRE)	20.67
7.	Cedric van Branteghem (BEL)	20.70
8.	LaTonel Williams (JAM)	20.73

== Heats ==
Held on Wednesday 27 August 2003

RANK	HEAT 1	TIME
1.	Marcin Jędrusiński (POL)	20.58
2.	John Capel (USA)	20.59
3.	Ricardo Williams (JAM)	20.60
4.	James Dolphin (NZL)	20.69
5.	Julieon Raeburn (TRI)	21.15
—	Sittichai Suwonprateep (THA)	DQ
—	Alex Giovani Navas (HON)	DQ

RANK	HEAT 2	TIME
1.	Stéphane Buckland (MRI)	20.38
2.	Anastásios Goúsis (GRE)	20.57
3.	Christian Malcolm (GBR)	20.65
4.	Oumar Loum (SEN)	20.73
5.	Paul Brizzel (IRL)	20.75
6.	Hisashi Miyazaki (JPN)	20.79
7.	Aaron Egbele (NGR)	21.24
8.	Ashuin De Souza (AIA)	23.24

RANK	HEAT 3	TIME
1.	Sherwin Vries (RSA)	20.73
2.	Troy Douglas (NED)	20.76
3.	Julian Golding (GBR)	20.82
4.	Hamed Hamadan Al-Bishi (KSA)	20.86
5.	Heber Viera (URU)	20.87
6.	Jorge Conde (NCA)	22.75
—	Christian Nsiah (GHA)	DQ

RANK	HEAT 4	TIME
1.	Darvis Patton (USA)	20.27
2.	Alessandro Cavallaro (ITA)	20.42
3.	Marcin Urbaś (POL)	20.66
4.	LaTonel Williams (JAM)	20.71
5.	Géza Pauer (HUN)	21.02
6.	Jaysuma Saidy Ndure (GAM)	21.42
7.	Darian Forbes (TCA)	21.87

RANK	HEAT 5	TIME
1.	Shingo Suetsugu (JPN)	20.58
2.	Joseph Batangdon (CMR)	20.71
3.	Cedric van Branteghem (BEL)	20.79
4.	Francis Obikwelu (POR)	20.93
5.	Gennadiy Chernovol (KAZ)	21.11
6.	Tobias Unger (GER)	21.33
7.	Hamoud Abdallah Al-Dalhami (OMA)	21.52

RANK	HEAT 6	TIME
1.	Cláudio Roberto Sousa (BRA)	20.82
2.	Christopher Williams (JAM)	20.86
3.	Patrick Johnson (AUS)	20.89
4.	Yang Yaozu (CHN)	20.90
5.	Adrian Durant (ISV)	21.11
6.	Evans Marie (SEY)	22.60
7.	Ashley Kazuma (PLW)	23.84
—	Konstantinos Kenteris (GRE)	DNS

RANK	HEAT 7	TIME
1.	Johan Wissman (SWE)	20.54
2.	Uchenna Emedolu (NGR)	20.55
3.	Joshua J. Johnson (USA)	20.56
4.	Issa-Aimé Nthépé (FRA)	20.83
5.	Anninos Marcoullides (CYP)	20.97
6.	Keita Cline (IVB)	21.31
7.	John Lumkon (FIJ)	21.55

RANK	HEAT 8	TIME
1.	Darren Campbell (GBR)	20.54
2.	Dominic Demeritte (BAH)	20.56
3.	Frank Fredericks (NAM)	20.65
4.	Panagiotis Sarris (GRE)	20.70
5.	Brian Dzingai (ZIM)	20.96
6.	Salem Al-Qaifi (YEM)	22.94
7.	Ogumoro Shane (MNP)	23.77
—	Salem Mubarak Al-Yami (KSA)	DNS

== See also ==
- Athletics at the 2003 Pan American Games - Men's 200 metres
