= Athletics at the 2006 Commonwealth Games – Men's 4 × 100 metres relay =

Men's 4 × 100 metres relay at the Commonwealth Games

The men's 4 × 100 metres relay event at the 2006 Commonwealth Games was held on March 24–25.

== Medalists ==
Gold	Silver	Bronze
Jamaica; Michael Frater; Ainsley Waugh; Chris Williams; Asafa Powell; Winston Smith*	South Africa; Lee Roy Newton; Leigh Julius; Snyman Prinsloo; Sherwin Vries	Canada; Charles Allen; Anson Henry; Nathan Taylor; Emanuel Parris

== Results ==
=== Heats ===
Qualification: First 2 teams of each heat (Q) plus the next 2 fastest (q) qualified for the final.

Rank	Heat	Nation	Athletes	Time	Notes
1	3	Jamaica	Michael Frater, Ainsley Waugh, Winston Smith, Asafa Powell	38.52	Q
2	3	Australia	Daniel Batman, Joshua Ross, Adam Miller, Ambrose Ezenwa	38.57	Q
3	2	Canada	Charles Allen, Anson Henry, Nathan Taylor, Emanuel Parris	38.86	Q
4	3	Ghana	Leonard Myles-Mills, Eric Nkansah, Seth Amoo, Aziz Zakari	39.03	q
5	1	New Zealand	Matthew Brown, James Mortimer, James Dolphin, Chris Donaldson	39.04	Q
6	1	Mauritius	Fabrice Coiffic, Fernando Augustin, Stéphan Buckland, Ommanandsing Kowlessur	39.55	Q
7	2	South Africa	Lee Roy Newton, Leigh Julius, Snyman Prinsloo, Sherwin Vries	39.62	Q
8	1	Antigua and Barbuda	Nkosie Barnes, Daniel Bailey, Ivan Miller, Brendan Christian	39.90	q
9	3	Sierra Leone	Lamin Tucker, Josephus Thomas, Samuel Randall, Gibrilla Bangura	40.05	
10	3	Cameroon	Biao Sani, François Belinga, Alfred Moussambani, Emmanuel Ngom Priso	40.23	
11	3	Papua New Guinea	Fabian Niulai, Wally Kirika, Henry Ben, Anton Lui	40.57	
12	2	Cayman Islands	Robert Ibeh, Stephen Antoine Ovar Johnson, Ronald Forbes, Kareem Streete-Thompson	40.76	
13	1	Fiji	Iliesa Namosimalua, Jone Delai, Waisea Finau, Niko Verekauta	41.03	
14	1	Solomon Islands	Francis Manioru, Chris Walasi, Jack Iroga, Nelson Kabitana	41.67	
15	2	Turks and Caicos Islands	Willah Gray, Darian Forbes, Isaiah Gardiner, Delano Fulford	42.30	
	1	Nigeria	Uzodinma Alozie, Uchenna Emedolu, Peter Emelieze, Deji Aliu	DNF	
	1	Trinidad and Tobago	Kevon Pierre, Marc Burns, Jacey Harper, Aaron Armstrong	DNF	
	2	England	Andy Turner, Darren Campbell, Marlon Devonish, Mark Lewis-Francis	DNF	
	3	Vanuatu	Abraham Kepsen, Moses Kamut, Robert Nidithawae, Arnold Sorina	DNF	
	2	Kiribati	Toom Annaua, Ieie Matang, Rabangaki Nawai, Mariuti Uan	DNS	

=== Final ===
Rank	Lane	Nation	Athletes	Time	Notes
1st place, gold medalist(s)	3	Jamaica	Michael Frater, Ainsley Waugh, Chris Williams, Asafa Powell	38.36	
2nd place, silver medalist(s)	7	South Africa	Lee Roy Newton, Leigh Julius, Snyman Prinsloo, Sherwin Vries	38.98	
3rd place, bronze medalist(s)	5	Canada	Charles Allen, Anson Henry, Nathan Taylor, Emanuel Parris	39.21	
4	8	Mauritius	Fabrice Coiffic, Fernando Augustin, Stéphan Buckland, Ommanandsing Kowlessur	39.97	
5	2	Antigua and Barbuda	Nkosie Barnes, Daniel Bailey, Ivan Miller, Brendan Christian	40.76	
	4	Australia	Daniel Batman, Patrick Johnson, Adam Miller, Matt Shirvington	DNF	
	1	Ghana	Clement Agyeman, Leonard Myles-Mills, Eric Nkansah, Aziz Zakari	DNF	
	6	New Zealand	Matthew Brown, James Mortimer, James Dolphin, Chris Donaldson	DNF	
