= Athletics at the 2003 All-Africa Games – Men's 200 metres =

The men's 200 metres at the 2003 All-Africa Games were held on October 13–14.

== Medalists ==
Gold	Silver	Bronze
Uchenna Emedolu; Nigeria (NGR)	Frankie Fredericks; Namibia (NAM)	Aziz Zakari; Ghana (GHA)

== Results ==
=== Heats ===
Qualification: First 4 of each heat (Q) and the next 4 fastest (q) qualified for the semifinals.

Wind:
Heat 1: 0.0 m/s, Heat 2: -0.8 m/s, Heat 3: -1.4 m/s, Heat 4: 0.0 m/s, Heat 5: -0.4 m/s

Rank	Heat	Name	Nationality	Time	Notes
1	4	Oumar Loum	Senegal	20.92	Q
2	4	Christian Nsiah	Ghana	20.97	Q
3	5	Joseph Batangdon	Cameroon	20.99	Q
4	2	Aziz Zakari	Ghana	21.24	Q
5	3	Sherwin Vries	South Africa	21.28	Q
6	1	Frankie Fredericks	Namibia	21.41	Q
7	4	Temba Ncube	Zimbabwe	21.42	Q
8	2	Aaron Egbele	Nigeria	21.54	Q
8	5	Clinton Venter	South Africa	21.54	Q
10	5	Jacques Sambou	Senegal	21.57	Q
11	3	Jaysuma Saidy Ndure	Gambia	21.59	Q
12	1	Ernest Osei	Ghana	21.62	Q
13	4	Tobias Akwenye	Namibia	21.65	Q
14	2	Abubaker El Tawerghi	Libya	21.67	Q
15	4	Narcisse Tévoédjré	Benin	21.70	q
16	3	Godwin Tauya	Zimbabwe	21.73	Q
17	1	Uchenna Emedolu	Nigeria	21.75	Q
18	1	Alie Dady Bangura	Sierra Leone	21.80	Q
19	5	Sandy Walker	Sierra Leone	21.83	Q
20	4	Devilert Arsene Kimbembe	Republic of the Congo	21.87	q
21	2	Joseph Brent	Liberia	21.91	Q
22	3	Samuel Randall	Sierra Leone	21.92	Q
23	2	Makame Ally	Tanzania	22.15	q
24	1	Oijmar Bela	Guinea	22.23	q
24	2	Kebba Fatty	Gambia	22.23	
26	1	Evans Marie	Seychelles	22.50	
27	5	Tlhalosang Molapisi	Botswana	22.55	
28	3	Youba Hmeida	Mauritania	22.84	
29	5	Kalubi Nbala	Democratic Republic of the Congo	22.99	
30	1	Kitenge Fibel	Democratic Republic of the Congo	23.04	
31	2	Amanuel Ghebrengus	Eritrea	23.52	
32	5	Kapena Rukero	Namibia	32.69	
	3	Abraham Koiyan Morlu	Liberia	DNF	
	1	Roger Angouono-Moke	Republic of the Congo	DNS	
	3	Correia Domingos	Guinea-Bissau	DNS	
	3	Deji Aliu	Nigeria	DNS	
	4	Costa Ocanamando	Guinea-Bissau	DNS	
	4	Moses Amon Kondowe	Malawi	DNS	

=== Semifinals ===
Qualification: First 2 of each semifinal (Q) and the next 2 fastest (q) qualified for the final.

Wind:
Heat 1: +1.1 m/s, Heat 2: 0.0 m/s, Heat 3: +0.6 m/s

Rank	Heat	Name	Nationality	Time	Notes
1	1	Oumar Loum	Senegal	20.83	Q
2	1	Christian Nsiah	Ghana	20.95	Q
3	1	Clinton Venter	South Africa	21.24	
4	1	Godwin Tauya	Zimbabwe	21.30	
5	1	Jaysuma Saidy Ndure	Gambia	21.39	
6	1	Sandy Walker	Sierra Leone	21.69	
7	1	Abubaker El Tawerghi	Libya	21.77	
	1	Oijmar Bela	Guinea	DNS	
1	2	Joseph Batangdon	Cameroon	20.87	Q
2	2	Aaron Egbele	Nigeria	21.10	Q
3	2	Temba Ncube	Zimbabwe	21.44	
4	2	Tobias Akwenye	Namibia	21.50	
5	2	Joseph Brent	Liberia	21.71	
6	2	Ernest Osei	Ghana	21.72	
7	2	Alie Dady Bangura	Sierra Leone	21.75	
8	2	Devilert Arsene Kimbembe	Republic of the Congo	21.95	
1	3	Frankie Fredericks	Namibia	20.33	Q
2	3	Uchenna Emedolu	Nigeria	20.38	Q
3	3	Aziz Zakari	Ghana	20.41	q
4	3	Sherwin Vries	South Africa	20.88	q
5	3	Jacques Sambou	Senegal	21.60	
6	3	Samuel Randall	Sierra Leone	21.??	
7	3	Makame Ally	Tanzania	21.92	
	3	Narcisse Tévoédjré	Benin	DNS	

=== Final ===
Wind: -0.9 m/s

Rank	Name	Nationality	Time	Notes
1st place, gold medalist(s)	Uchenna Emedolu	Nigeria	20.42	
2nd place, silver medalist(s)	Frankie Fredericks	Namibia	20.43	
3rd place, bronze medalist(s)	Aziz Zakari	Ghana	20.51	
4	Oumar Loum	Senegal	20.86	
5	Aaron Egbele	Nigeria	21.03	
6	Joseph Batangdon	Cameroon	21.09	
7	Sherwin Vries	South Africa	21.17	
8	Christian Nsiah	Ghana	21.19	
