= 2005 World Championships in Athletics – Men's 200 metres =

Men's 200 metres at the 2005 World Championships
- Venue: Helsinki Olympic Stadium
- Dates: 9 August (heats); 10 August (quarter-finals and semi-finals); 11 August (final)
- Competitors: 61 from 43 nations
- Winning time: 20.04

Medalists
gold medal	Justin Gatlin	United States
silver medal	Wallace Spearmon	United States
bronze medal	John Capel	United States

The men's 200 metres at the 2005 World Championships in Athletics was held at the Helsinki Olympic Stadium on August 9, 10 and 11 August. The winning margin was 0.16 seconds.

== Medals ==
Gold:	Silver:	Bronze:
Justin Gatlin, United States	Wallace Spearmon, United States	John Capel, United States

== Results ==
All times shown are in seconds.
Q denotes qualification by place.
q denotes qualification by time.
DNS denotes did not start.
DNF denotes did not finish.
AR denotes area record
NR denotes national record.
PB denotes personal best.
SB denotes season's best.

=== Heats ===
August 9

==== Heat 1 ====
1. Stéphane Buckland, Mauritius 20.94 Q
2. Andrew Howe, Italy 21.08 Q
3. Aaron Armstrong, Trinidad and Tobago 21.10 Q
4. Panagiotis Sarris, Greece 21.43
5. André da Silva, Brazil 21.44
6. Heber Viera, Uruguay 21.71
7. Nabie Foday Fofana, Guinea 22.16 (SB)
8. Afzal Baig, Pakistan 22.54

==== Heat 2 ====
1. Ronald Pognon, France 20.37 Q
2. Brian Dzingai, Zimbabwe 20.76 Q
3. Yordan Ilinov, Bulgaria 20.85 Q
4. Hamed Hamadan Al-Bishi, Saudi Arabia 21.03
5. Julieon Raeburn, Trinidad and Tobago 21.12
6. Evans Marie, Seychelles 21.65
7. Noor Adi Bin Rostam, Brunei 24.05
- Obadele Thompson, Barbados DNS

==== Heat 3 ====
1. (United Kingdom) Christian Malcolm, Great Britain 20.36 Q
2. John Capel, United States 20.40 Q (SB)
3. Sebastian Ernst, Germany 20.45 Q (SB)
4. Patrick Johnson, Australia 20.56 q (SB)
5. Tommi Hartonen, Finland 20.59 q (SB)
6. Daniel Abenzoar-Foulé, Luxembourg 21.10 (PB)
7. Nicholas Mangham, Palau 24.39 (PB)
- Omar Brown, Jamaica DNF

==== Heat 4 ====
1. Tobias Unger, Germany 20.45 Q
2. Christopher Williams, Jamaica 20.64 Q
3. (United Kingdom) Marlon Devonish, Great Britain 20.75 Q
4. Olusoji Fasuba, Nigeria 20.88 q
5. Matic Osovnikar, Slovenia 20.94
6. Basílio de Moraes, Brazil 20.99
7. Abubaker El Tawerghi, Libya 21.72 (SB)
8. Darian Forbes, Turks and Caicos Islands DNS

==== Heat 5 ====
1. Usain Bolt, Jamaica 20.80 Q
2. Shingo Suetsugu, Japan 20.85 Q
3. Kristof Beyens, Belgium 20.88 Q
4. Koura Kaba Fantoni, Italy 21.10
5. Kevon Pierre, Trinidad and Tobago 21.24
6. Oumar Loum, Senegal 21.37
7. Béranger Bosse, Central African Republic 22.02

==== Heat 6 ====
Wind: 4.3 m/s

1. Tyson Gay, United States 19.99 Q
2. Marcin Jędrusiński, Poland 20.14 Q
3. (The Gambia) Jaysuma Saidy Ndure, Gambia 20.14 Q
4. Uchenna Emedolu, Nigeria 20.22 q
5. Johan Wissman, Sweden 20.26 q
6. Leigh Julius, South Africa 20.37 q
7. (Republic of Ireland) Paul Hession, Ireland 20.40 q

==== Heat 7 ====
1. Daniel Batman, Australia 20.68 Q
2. Guus Hoogmoed, Netherlands 20.80 Q
3. Justin Gatlin, United States 20.90 Q
4. Shinji Takahira, Japan 21.03
5. Dmytro Hlushchenko, Ukraine 21.15
6. (Eswatini) Mphelave Dlamin, Swaziland 21.79 (PB)
7. Dion Crabbe, British Virgin Islands 21.82
- Francis Obikwelu, Portugal DNS

==== Heat 8 ====
1. Wallace Spearmon, United States 20.51 Q
2. Juan Pedro Toledo, Mexico 20.78 Q
3. Joseph Batangdon, Cameroon 20.84 Q
4. (The Bahamas) Dominic Demeritte, Bahamas 20.90 q
5. Yaozu Yang, PR China 21.03
6. Bruno Pacheco, Brazil 21.05
- David Alerte, France DNF

=== Quarterfinals ===
August 10

==== Heat 1 ====
1. Tobias Unger, Germany 20.91 Q
2. Wallace Spearmon, United States 20.91 Q
3. Patrick Johnson, Australia 20.94 Q
4. Joseph Batangdon, Cameroon 21.38
5. (Republic of Ireland) Paul Hession, Ireland 21.69
6. Yordan Ilinov, Bulgaria 21.94
7. Brian Dzingai, Zimbabwe 22.32
- Juan Pedro Toledo, Mexico DSQ

==== Heat 2 ====
1. Tyson Gay, United States 20.64 Q
2. Stéphane Buckland, Mauritius 20.66 Q
3. (The Gambia) Jaysuma Saidy Ndure, Gambia 20.95 Q
4. Marcin Jędrusiński, Poland 21.07 q
5. Johan Wissman, Sweden 21.16
6. Andrew Howe, Italy 21.19
7. (The Bahamas) Dominic Demeritte, Bahamas 21.25
- Uchenna Emedolu, Nigeria DNF

==== Heat 3 ====
1. John Capel, United States 20.78 Q
2. Usain Bolt, Jamaica 20.87 Q
3. Aaron Armstrong, Trinidad and Tobago 20.94 Q
4. (United Kingdom) Christian Malcolm, Great Britain 21.02 q
5. Shingo Suetsugu, Japan 21.11 q
6. Leigh Julius, South Africa 21.45
7. Sebastian Ernst, Germany 21.54
8. Olusoji Fasuba, Nigeria 21.92

==== Heat 4 ====
1. Christopher Williams, Jamaica 20.93 Q
2. Justin Gatlin, United States 20.94 Q
3. (United Kingdom) Marlon Devonish, Great Britain 20.95 Q
4. Daniel Batman, Australia 20.95 q
5. Ronald Pognon, France 21.26
6. Guus Hoogmoed, Netherlands 21.26
7. Kristof Beyens, Belgium 21.43
8. Tommi Hartonen, Finland 21.54

=== Semifinals ===
August 10

==== Heat 1 ====
1. John Capel, United States 20.45 Q
2. Wallace Spearmon, United States 20.49 Q
3. Tobias Unger, Germany 20.63 Q
4. Usain Bolt, Jamaica 20.68 Q
5. (The Gambia) Jaysuma Saidy Ndure, Gambia 20.75
6. Daniel Batman, Australia 20.98
7. (United Kingdom) Christian Malcolm, Great Britain 21.09
- Aaron Armstrong, Trinidad and Tobago DNS

==== Heat 2 ====
1. Tyson Gay, United States 20.27 Q
2. Justin Gatlin, United States 20.47 Q
3. Stéphane Buckland, Mauritius 20.54 Q
4. Patrick Johnson, Australia 20.65 Q
5. Christopher Williams, Jamaica 20.72
6. Shingo Suetsugu, Japan 20.84
7. (United Kingdom) Marlon Devonish, Great Britain 20.93
8. Marcin Jędrusiński, Poland 20.99

=== Final ===
August 11

Rank	Lane	Name	Nationality	Time	Notes
1st place, gold medalist(s)	6	Justin Gatlin	United States (USA)	20.04	
2nd place, silver medalist(s)	3	Wallace Spearmon	United States (USA)	20.20	
3rd place, bronze medalist(s)	4	John Capel	United States (USA)	20.31	SB
4	5	Tyson Gay	United States (USA)	20.34	
5	7	Stéphane Buckland	Mauritius (MRI)	20.41	
6	8	Patrick Johnson	Australia (AUS)	20.58	
7	2	Tobias Unger	Germany (GER)	20.81	
8	1	Usain Bolt	Jamaica (JAM)	26.27	
