= Athletics at the 2006 Commonwealth Games – Men's 100 metres =

Men's 100 metres at the 2006 Commonwealth Games
- Venue: Melbourne Cricket Ground
- Dates: 19-20 March
- Competitors: 60 from 30 nations
- Winning time: 10.03

Medalists
gold medal	Asafa Powell	Jamaica
silver medal	Olusoji Fasuba	Nigeria
bronze medal	Marc Burns	Trinidad and Tobago

The 100 metres at the 2006 Commonwealth Games as part of the athletics programme were held at the Melbourne Cricket Ground on Sunday 19 March and Monday 20 March 2006.

The top three runners in each of the initial eight heats automatically qualified for the second round. The next eight fastest runners from across the heats also qualified. Those 32 runners competed in 4 heats in the second round, with the top four runners from each heat qualifying for the semifinals. There were two semifinals, and only the top four from each heat advanced to the final.

== Records ==
World Record	9.77	Asafa Powell	JAM	Athens, Greece	14 June 2005
Games Record	9.88	Ato Boldon	TRI	Kuala Lumpur, Malaysia	17 September 1998

== Qualification ==
Going into the event, the top ten Commonwealth athletes as ranked by the International Association of Athletics Federations were:

13 March Rank		Athlete	Nation	Games Result	27 March Rank	
Comm.	World	Athlete	Nation	Games Result	Comm.	World
1	2	Aziz Zakari	Ghana	5th	2	3
=2	=3	Asafa Powell	Jamaica	Gold	1	2
=2	=3	Dwight Thomas	Jamaica	Did not compete	3	4
4	7	Marc Burns	Trinidad and Tobago	Bronze	4	7
5	8	Kim Collins	Saint Kitts and Nevis	Did not compete	5	8
6	10	Michael Frater	Jamaica	Semi-finalist	6	10
7	11	Jason Gardener	England	Second round	7	11
8	12	Darrel Brown	Trinidad and Tobago	Second round	8	12
9	14	Olusoji Fasuba	Nigeria	Silver	9	13
10	15	Uchenna Emedolu	Nigeria	4th	10	15

== Results ==
=== Round 1 ===
Heat 1

Rank	Lane	Athlete	Nation	Reaction	Time	Notes
1	7	Aziz Zakari	Ghana	0.194	10.45	Q
2	3	Ainsley Waugh	Jamaica	0.185	10.51	Q
3	2	Seth Amoo	Ghana	0.248	10.61	Q
4	1	Tlhalosang Molapisi	Botswana	0.202	10.85	
5	4	Delano Fulford	Turks and Caicos Islands	0.194	11.06	
6	5	Abraham Kepsen	Vanuatu	0.184	11.08	
7	6	Ieie Matang	Kiribati	0.232	11.63	
					Wind: ?.? m/s	

Heat 2

Rank	Lane	Athlete	Nation	Reaction	Time	Notes
1	3	Michael Frater	Jamaica	0.163	10.37	Q
2	1	Emmanuel Ngom Priso	Cameroon	0.209	10.46	Q
3	5	Gibrilla Bangura	Sierra Leone	0.150	10.48	Q
4	2	Kareem Streete-Thompson	Cayman Islands	0.164	10.59	q
5	7	Casnel Bushay	Saint Vincent and the Grenadines	0.187	10.68	q
6	4	Wally Kirika	Papua New Guinea	0.211	10.76	q
7	6	Jone Mudu	Fiji	0.150	10.93	
					Wind: +2.4 m/s	

Heat 3

Rank	Lane	Athlete	Nation	Reaction	Time	Notes
1	5	Jason Gardener	England	0.140	10.41	Q
2	4	Olusoji Fasuba	Nigeria	0.183	10.43	Q
3	2	Eric Nkansah	Ghana	0.146	10.44	Q, SB
4	7	Lee-Roy Newton	South Africa	0.162	10.51	q
5	6	Josephus Thomas	Sierra Leone	0.179	10.54	q
6	1	Matthew Thomas	Saint Lucia	0.179	10.70	q
7	3	Jack Iroga	Solomon Islands	0.176	11.13	
					Wind: +1.9 m/s	

Heat 4

Rank	Lane	Athlete	Nation	Reaction	Time	Notes
1	3	Mark Lewis-Francis	England	0.123	10.20	Q
2	5	Uchenna Emedolu	Nigeria	0.192	10.23	Q
3	1	Anson Henry	Canada	0.142	10.25	Q, SB
4	7	Lamin Tucker	Sierra Leone	0.161	10.80	
5	4	Francis Manioru	Solomon Islands	0.168	11.12	SB
6	6	Anton Lui	Papua New Guinea	0.211	11.15	
7	2	Billie Wallbridge-Paea	Niue	0.187	11.28	
8	8	Robert Nidithawae	Vanuatu	0.164	11.60	
					Wind: +1.2 m/s	

Heat 5

Rank	Lane	Athlete	Nation	Reaction	Time	Notes
1	2	Marlon Devonish	England	0.160	10.23	Q
2	1	Joshua Ross	Australia	0.161	10.36	Q
3	4	Daniel Bailey	Antigua and Barbuda	0.152	10.43	Q
4	7	Jaycey Harper	Trinidad and Tobago	0.152	10.57	q
5	5	Chris Walasi	Solomon Islands	0.168	10.78	q, PB
6	8	Henry Ben	Papua New Guinea	0.203	11.01	
7	6	Mariuti Uan	Kiribati	0.169	11.65	PB
8	3	Mohamed Asim	Maldives	0.216	12.75	
					Wind: +1.3 m/s	

Heat 6

Rank	Lane	Athlete	Nation	Reaction	Time	Notes
1	7	Asafa Powell	Jamaica	0.150	10.53	Q
2	4	Deji Aliu	Nigeria	0.197	10.53	Q
3	6	Biao Sani	Cameroon	0.170	10.70	Q
4	3	Jone Delai	Fiji	0.178	10.80	
5	5	Jayson Jones	Belize	0.235	10.84	
6	8	Kebba Fatty	The Gambia	0.144	10.90	SB
7	2	Pat Henry	Dominica	0.228	11.87	
8	1	Christian Malcolm	Wales	0.234	32.72	
					Wind: +0.3 m/s	

Heat 7

Rank	Lane	Athlete	Nation	Reaction	Time	Notes
1	2	Patrick Johnson	Australia	0.195	10.50	Q
2	1	Marc Burns	Trinidad and Tobago	0.231	10.50	Q
3	4	Moses Kamut	Vanuatu	0.204	10.80	Q
4	6	Michael Henry	Montserrat	0.176	10.88	PB
5	3	Alfred Moussambani	Cameroon	0.166	10.89	
6	5	Isaiah Gardiner	Turks and Caicos Islands	0.174	11.36	
-	7	Pierre Browne	Canada	-	DNS	
					Wind: +1.9 m/s	

Heat 8

Rank	Lane	Athlete	Nation	Reaction	Time	Notes
1	1	Darrel Brown	Trinidad and Tobago	0.162	10.51	Q
2	7	Sherwin Vries	South Africa	0.214	10.52	Q
3	2	Ambrose Ezenwa	Australia	0.136	10.53	Q
4	6	Stephen Antoine Ovar Johnson	Cayman Islands	0.173	10.85	
5	5	Makame Machano	Tanzania	0.247	10.95	PB
6	8	Kebba Jassey	The Gambia	0.232	11.17	
7	3	Odingo Gordon	Montserrat	0.189	11.53	PB
8	4	Henrico Louis	Mauritius	0.163	12.04	
					Wind: +1.2 m/s	

=== Round 2 ===
Heat 1

Rank	Lane	Athlete	Nation	Reaction	Time	Notes
1	5	Michael Frater	Jamaica	0.126	10.25	Q
2	3	Patrick Johnson	Australia	0.157	10.33	Q
3	4	Olusoji Fasuba	Nigeria	0.187	10.37	Q
4	1	Jaycey Harper	Trinidad and Tobago	0.150	10.45	Q
5	6	Emmanuel Ngom Priso	Cameroon	0.168	10.66	
6	2	Matthew Thomas	Saint Lucia	0.162	10.71	
7	7	Seth Amoo	Ghana	0.239	10.75	
8	8	Chris Walasi	Solomon Islands	0.169	10.85	PB
					Wind: +0.3 m/s	

Heat 2

Rank	Lane	Athlete	Nation	Reaction	Time	Notes
1	5	Aziz Zakari	Ghana	0.185	10.36	Q
2	6	Marc Burns	Trinidad and Tobago	0.228	10.43	Q
3	8	Ambrose Ezenwa	Australia	0.139	10.47	Q
4	3	Ainsley Waugh	Jamaica	0.167	10.49	Q
5	4	Jason Gardener	England	0.147	10.58	
6	2	Kareem Streete-Thompson	Cayman Islands	0.138	10.71	
7	1	Gibrilla Bangura	Sierra Leone	0.147	10.78	
8	7	Casnel Bushay	Saint Vincent and the Grenadines	0.167	10.99	
					Wind: -0.4 m/s	

Heat 3

Heat	Lane	Athlete	Nation	Reaction	Time	Notes
1	3	Asafa Powell	Jamaica	0.138	10.29	Q
2	2	Anson Henry	Canada	0.133	10.30	Q
3	4	Mark Lewis-Francis	England	0.167	10.41	Q
4	5	Deji Aliu	Nigeria	0.177	10.43	Q
5	1	Lee-Roy Newton	South Africa	0.193	10.53	
6	6	Darrel Brown	Trinidad and Tobago	0.150	10.79	
7	8	Eric Nkansah	Ghana	0.141	11.10	
8	7	Moses Kamut	Vanuatu	0.188	11.16	
					Wind: -0.5 m/s	

Heat 4

Rank	Lane	Athlete	Nation	Reaction	Time	Notes
1	6	Uchenna Emedolu	Nigeria	0.178	10.15	Q
2	3	Marlon Devonish	England	0.157	10.21	Q
3	5	Joshua Ross	Australia	0.143	10.23	Q
4	4	Sherwin Vries	South Africa	0.167	10.32	Q
5	2	Daniel Bailey	Antigua and Barbuda	0.139	10.38	
6	1	Josephus Thomas	Sierra Leone	0.151	10.49	
7	8	Biao Sani	Cameroon	0.167	10.60	
8	7	Wally Kirika	Papua New Guinea	0.181	10.80	
					Wind: +1.8 m/s	

=== Semi-finals ===
Heat 1

Rank	Lane	Athlete	Nation	Reaction	Time	Notes
1	5	Marc Burns	Trinidad and Tobago	0.154	10.15	Q
2	6	Uchenna Emedolu	Nigeria	0.161	10.21	Q
3	3	Aziz Zakari	Ghana	0.144	10.24	Q
4	4	Marlon Devonish	England	0.143	10.27	Q
5	8	Joshua Ross	Australia	0.163	10.28	
6	1	Sherwin Vries	South Africa	0.170	10.33	
7	2	Ainsley Waugh	Jamaica	0.135	10.35	
8	7	Ambrose Ezenwa	Australia	0.140	10.50	
					Wind: -0.6 m/s	

Heat 2

Rank	Lane	Athlete	Nation	Reaction	Time	Notes
1	6	Asafa Powell	Jamaica	0.155	10.03	Q
2	2	Olusoji Fasuba	Nigeria	0.164	10.15	Q
3	3	Patrick Johnson	Australia	0.151	10.26	Q
4	5	Anson Henry	Canada	0.154	10.26	Q
5	8	Deji Aliu	Nigeria	0.203	10.38	
6	7	Jaycey Harper	Trinidad and Tobago	0.122	10.46	
-	4	Michael Frater	Jamaica	0.146	DQ	
-	1	Mark Lewis-Francis	England	-0.018	DQ	
					Wind: +0.2 m/s	

=== Final ===
Place	Lane	Athlete	Nation	Reaction	Time	Notes
1st place, gold medalist(s)	3	Asafa Powell	Jamaica	0.139	10.03	
2nd place, silver medalist(s)	6	Olusoji Fasuba	Nigeria	0.152	10.11	
3rd place, bronze medalist(s)	4	Marc Burns	Trinidad and Tobago	0.201	10.17	
4	5	Uchenna Emedolu	Nigeria	0.164	10.22	
5	2	Aziz Zakari	Ghana	0.177	10.22	
6	8	Patrick Johnson	Australia	0.173	10.26	
7	1	Anson Henry	Canada	0.149	10.28	
8	7	Marlon Devonish	England	0.137	10.30	
					Wind: +0.9 m/s	
