= Jamaica at the 2006 Commonwealth Games =

- CGF code: JAM
- CGA: Jamaica Olympic Association
- Website: www.joa.org.jm

in Melbourne, Australia
- Flag bearers: Opening: Closing:
- Medals Ranked 7th: Gold 10 Silver 4 Bronze 8 Total 22

Commonwealth Games appearances (overview)
- 1934; 1938–1950; 1954; 1958; 1962; 1966; 1970; 1974; 1978; 1982; 1986; 1990; 1994; 1998; 2002; 2006; 2010; 2014; 2018; 2022; 2026; 2030

The Official Logo of the Jamaican Commonwealth Games Association

Team pin

Jamaica was represented at the 2006 Commonwealth Games in Melbourne. The team won 22 medals including 10 gold.

== Medals ==
	(gold)	(silver)	(bronze)	Total
Jamaica	10	4	8	22

== Medalists ==
Medal	Name	Sport	Event	Date
Silver	Dorian Scott	Athletics	Men's shot put	20 March
Silver	Maurice Smith|	Athletics	Men's decathlon	21 March
Silver	Veronica Campbell-Brown	Athletics	Women's 200 metres	23 March
Silver	Kenia Sinclair	Athletics	Women's 800 metres	24 March
Bronze	Olivia McKoy	Athletics	Women's Javelin Throw	19 March
Bronze	Novlene Williams	Athletics		21 March
Bronze	Jermaine Gonzales	Athletics		22 March
Bronze	Kemel Thompson	Athletics		
Bronze	Chris Williams	Athletics		March 23
Bronze	Delloreen Ennis-London	Athletics	Women's 400 metres	21 March
Bronze	Chris Williams	Athletics	Men's 200 metres	March 23
Bronze	Karen Beautle	Athletics	Women's high jump	March 23

=== Bronze ===
- Athletics, Men's 4 × 400 m Relay

=== Gold ===
- Asafa Powell, Athletics, Men's 100 m
- Sheri-Ann Brooks, Athletics, Women's 100 m
- Maurice Wignall, Athletics, Men's 110 m Hurdles
- Trecia Smith, Athletics, Women's Triple Jump
- Tanto Campbell, Athletics, Men's Seated Discus Throw EAD
- Omar Brown, Athletics, Men's 200 m
- Sherone Simpson, Athletics, Women's 200 m
- Brigitte Foster-Hylton, Athletics, Women's 100 m Hurdles
- Athletics, Men's 4 × 100 m Relay
- Athletics, Women's 4 × 100 m Relay

== Netball ==
Jamaica finished fourth in the netball at the 2006 Commonwealth Games. In the bronze medal match, they lost 53–52 to England.

Pool 2

Friday 17 March; 13:00 (UTC+11)	Stats	Jamaica	67–22	Singapore	Umpires: Sharon Kelly; Marion Johnson-Hurley; Reserve umpire: Amanda Nottingham
Friday 17 March; 13:00 (UTC+11)	Stats	Scoring by quarter: 19-7, 15-8, 18-5, 15-2			Umpires: Sharon Kelly; Marion Johnson-Hurley; Reserve umpire: Amanda Nottingham
Friday 17 March; 13:00 (UTC+11)	Stats	Elaine Davis 25/32 (78%); Latoya Thomas 23/26 (88%); Simone Forbes 11/14 (79%); Jodi Ann Ffrench 8/10 (80%)		Tan Hui Yan 10/14 (71%); Li Ling 7/10 (70%); Chen Hui Fen 3/5 (60%); Jeanine Heng Wei Ping 2/5 (40%)	Umpires: Sharon Kelly; Marion Johnson-Hurley; Reserve umpire: Amanda Nottingham

Saturday 18 March; 18:30 (UTC+11)	Stats	Jamaica	69–30	Barbados	Umpires: Bobbi Brown; Sharon Kelly; Reserve umpire: Stacey Campton
Saturday 18 March; 18:30 (UTC+11)	Stats	Scoring by quarter: 22-5, 18-5, 15-9, 14-11			Umpires: Bobbi Brown; Sharon Kelly; Reserve umpire: Stacey Campton
Saturday 18 March; 18:30 (UTC+11)	Stats	Latoya Thomas 25/32 (78%); Elaine Davis 22/28 (79%); Simone Forbes 22/30 (73%)		Lydia Bishop 18/26 (69%); Laurel Browne 12/18 (67%)	Umpires: Bobbi Brown; Sharon Kelly; Reserve umpire: Stacey Campton

Monday 20 March; 15:00 (UTC+11)	Stats	Jamaica	74–21	Wales	Umpires: Anne Abraitis; Pauline Sciascia; Reserve umpire: Marion Johnson-Hurley
Monday 20 March; 15:00 (UTC+11)	Stats	Scoring by quarter: 21-2, 22-4, 15-7, 16-8			Umpires: Anne Abraitis; Pauline Sciascia; Reserve umpire: Marion Johnson-Hurley
Monday 20 March; 15:00 (UTC+11)	Stats	Elaine Davis 46/56 (82%); Simone Forbes 24/26 (92%); Jodi Ann Ffrench 4/5 (80%)		Rebecca James 16/24 (67%); Nicola Lewis 4/6 (67%); Jamilla Abbott 1/1 (100%)	Umpires: Anne Abraitis; Pauline Sciascia; Reserve umpire: Marion Johnson-Hurley

Wednesday 22 March; 18:30 (UTC+11)	Report; Stats	Australia	54–54	Jamaica	Umpires: Bronwyn Meek; Amanda Nottingham; Reserve umpire: Bobbi Brown
Wednesday 22 March; 18:30 (UTC+11)	Report; Stats	Scoring by quarter: 16-11, 11-13, 16-10, 11-20			Umpires: Bronwyn Meek; Amanda Nottingham; Reserve umpire: Bobbi Brown
Wednesday 22 March; 18:30 (UTC+11)	Report; Stats	Sharelle McMahon 27/33 (82%); Susan Pratley 14/18 (78%); Catherine Cox 13/17 (76%)		Elaine Davis 37/40 (93%); Simone Forbes 17/19 (89%)	Umpires: Bronwyn Meek; Amanda Nottingham; Reserve umpire: Bobbi Brown

Thursday 23 March; 21:00 (UTC+11)	Stats	Samoa	47–60	Jamaica	Umpires: Bronwyn Meek; Marion Johnson-Hurley; Reserve umpire: Amanda Nottingham
Thursday 23 March; 21:00 (UTC+11)	Stats	Scoring by quarter: 13-19, 13-16, 14-12, 7-13			Umpires: Bronwyn Meek; Marion Johnson-Hurley; Reserve umpire: Amanda Nottingham
Thursday 23 March; 21:00 (UTC+11)	Stats	Cathrine Latu 45/49 (92%); Malu Fa'asavalu 2/6 (33%)		Elaine Davis 43/46 (93%); Simone Forbes 17/18 (94%)	Umpires: Bronwyn Meek; Marion Johnson-Hurley; Reserve umpire: Amanda Nottingham

Table

Pos	Team	P	W	D	L	GF	GA	GD	Pts
1	Australia	5	4	1	0	387	169	+218	9
2	Jamaica	5	4	1	0	324	174	+150	9
3	Samoa	5	3	0	2	264	254	+10	6
4	Wales	5	2	0	3	185	271	-86	4
5	Barbados	5	2	0	3	183	279	-96	4
6	Singapore	5	0	0	5	150	346	-196	0

Qualified for Semi-finals
Qualified for Classification

Semi-final

Saturday 25 March; 18:30 (UTC+11)	Report; Stats	New Zealand	61–41	Jamaica	Umpires: Sharon Kelly; Michelle Phippard; Reserve umpire: Jacqui Jashari
Saturday 25 March; 18:30 (UTC+11)	Report; Stats	Scoring by quarter: 18-7, 14-10, 16-11, 13-13			Umpires: Sharon Kelly; Michelle Phippard; Reserve umpire: Jacqui Jashari
Saturday 25 March; 18:30 (UTC+11)	Report; Stats	Irene van Dyk 48/51 (94%); Belinda Colling 10/14 (71%); Maria Tutaia 3/5 (60%)		Elaine Davis 27/31 (87%); Simone Forbes 14/18 (78%)	Umpires: Sharon Kelly; Michelle Phippard; Reserve umpire: Jacqui Jashari

Bronze medal match

Sunday 26 March; 14:00 (UTC+11)	Stats	Jamaica	52–53	England	Umpires: Sharon Kelly; Amanda Nottingham; Reserve umpire: Michelle Phippard
Sunday 26 March; 14:00 (UTC+11)	Stats	Scoring by quarter: 18-10, 11-12, 11-16, 12-15			Umpires: Sharon Kelly; Amanda Nottingham; Reserve umpire: Michelle Phippard
Sunday 26 March; 14:00 (UTC+11)	Stats	Elaine Davis 46/52 (88%); Simone Forbes 6/9 (67%)		Abby Teare 30/36 (83%); Pamela Cookey 17/29 (59%); Rachel Dunn 6/10 (60%)	Umpires: Sharon Kelly; Amanda Nottingham; Reserve umpire: Michelle Phippard

Squad

Jamaica roster
Players
Coaches

Name	Pos	DOB	Height	Club	Nat	Caps
Nicole Aiken	GA, GD	11 December 1985 (aged 20)	1.87 m (6 ft 2 in)	Jamalco
Nadine Bryan	C, WA	18 December 1976 (aged 29)	1.65 m (5 ft 5 in)	Jamalco
Marion Campbell	C, WA	24 March 1984 (aged 21)	1.73 m (5 ft 8 in)	Tivoli Gardens
Elaine Davis (c)	GS, GK	21 September 1976 (aged 29)	1.90 m (6 ft 3 in)	Jamalco
Kasey Evering	GK, GS, WD	14 February 1983 (aged 23)	1.85 m (6 ft 1 in)	Tivoli Gardens
Jodi Ann Ffrench	GS, GA	23 July 1984 (aged 21)	1.75 m (5 ft 9 in)	Seneca
Simone Forbes	WD, C, GA	20 June 1981 (aged 24)	1.73 m (5 ft 8 in)	Waulgrovians
Nichala Gibson	WD, GD	20 October 1982 (aged 23)	1.72 m (5 ft 8 in)	Waulgrovians
Tamara Hylton	C, WA	24 April 1982 (aged 23)	1.72 m (5 ft 8 in)	Waulgrovians
Oberon Pitterson	GK, GD, WD	8 February 1971 (aged 35)	1.80 m (5 ft 11 in)	Waulgrovians
Latoya Thomas	GA, GS	8 November 1985 (aged 20)	1.85 m (6 ft 1 in)	Alpha
Peter-Gaye Thomas	C	9 April 1986 (aged 19)	1.73 m (5 ft 8 in)	Tivoli Gardens

Head coach

- Maureen Hall

Assistant coach

- Yvonne Keane-Dawes

Notes

- (c) – Captain
- (cc) – Co-captain
- (vc) – Vice-captain
- – Injury / maternity leave
- (TRP) – Temporary Replacement Player
