= Nathan Taylor (sprinter) =

Canadian sprinter

Personal information
- Born: January 31, 1983 (age 43)

Sport
- Country: Canada
- Sport: Athletics
- Event: Sprinting
Medal record
Commonwealth Games
Bronze medal – third place	2006 Melbourne	4 × 100 metres relay

Nathan Taylor (born January 31, 1983) is a Canadian former athlete who competed as a sprinter.

A native of Courtenay, British Columbia, Taylor was a junior "A" ice hockey winger for the Powell River Kings in his youth and only took up sprinting as a means of keeping up his fitness during the summer.

Taylor, a Canadian junior champion in the 100 metres, secured a scholarship to the University of Michigan.

In 2001 he won the 100 metres at the Canada Games, setting a record time in the event of 10.38 seconds.

Taylor was a member of the bronze medal-winning 4 × 100 metres relay team at the 2006 Commonwealth Games in Melbourne. He ran the third leg of the final, which was won by Jamaica.

His younger brother Adam played professional ice hockey.
