= Ainsley Waugh =

Jamaican track and field sprinter (born 1981)

Medal record

Men's athletics

Representing Jamaica

CAC Junior Championships (U20)
Gold medal – first place	1996 San Salvador	4x400 m relay

Ainsley Waugh (born 17 September 1981) is a Jamaican track and field sprinter who specialises in the 100 and 200 metres.

He made his major tournament debut at the 2005 World Championships in Athletics, reaching the quarter-finals in the 100 metres event. He competed at the 2006 Commonwealth Games in both the 100 and 200 metres but failed to progress beyond the semi-finals, registering below-par performances of 10.35 and 21.15.

He finished third in the 200 metres at the Grande Prêmio Brasil Caixa meeting in 2009, setting a new personal best of 20.22 seconds. Waugh also won the 100 metres race with a season's best of 10.16 seconds.

== Personal bests ==
Event	Time (seconds)	Venue	Date
100 metres	10.11	Lappeenranta, Finland	13 August 2011
200 metres	20.22	Belém, Brazil	24 May 2009

- All information taken from IAAF profile.

== Achievements ==
Year	Competition	Venue	Position	Event	Notes
Representing Jamaica
1996	CAC Junior Championships (U-20)	San Salvador, El Salvador	1st	4 × 400 m relay	3:09.67
2002	NACAC U-25 Championships	San Antonio, Texas, United States	3rd	200m	21.04 (wind: +0.5 m/s)
2002	NACAC U-25 Championships	San Antonio, Texas, United States	3rd	4 × 100 m relay	39.86
2002	Central American and Caribbean Games	San Salvador, El Salvador	4th (h)	200m	21.22 (wind: 0.0 m/s)
2005	World Championships	Helsinki, Finland	5th (qf)	100 m	10.39 (-1.2 m/s)
2005	World Championships	Helsinki, Finland	4th	4 × 100 m relay	38.28 SB
2006	Commonwealth Games	Melbourne, Australia	7th (sf)	100 m	10.35 (-0.6 m/s)
2006	Commonwealth Games	Melbourne, Australia	8th (sf)	200 m	21.15 (1.0 m/s)
2006	Commonwealth Games	Melbourne, Australia	1st	4 × 100 m relay	38.36
