= Emanuel Parris =

Canadian sprinter (born 1982)

Personal information
- Born: Emanuel J. Parris; October 7, 1982 (age 43) Etobicoke, Ontario, Canada
- Height: 175 cm (5 ft 9 in)

Sport
- Country: Canada
- Sport: Athletics
- Event: Sprinting
Medal record
Commonwealth Games
| Bronze medal – third place | 2006 Melbourne | 4 × 100 metres relay |

Emanuel J. Parris (born October 7, 1982) is a Canadian former athlete who competed as a sprinter.

Parris, born in Etobicoke, Ontario, was a collegiate athlete for the Université de Sherbrooke and represented Canada at the 2005 Summer Universiade. In 2006 he was a member of Canada's 4 × 100 metres relay team which won a bronze medal at the Commonwealth Games in Melbourne, running the final leg. He travelled to the 2008 Summer Olympics in Beijing as a reserve for the 4 × 100 metres relay.
