= Patrick Johnson (sprinter) =

Australian sprinter (born 1972)

Personal information
- Nationality: Australia
- Born: 26 September 1972 (age 54) Cairns, Queensland, Australia
- Height: 1.77 m (5 ft 10 in)
- Weight: 73 kg (161 lb)

Sport
- Sport: Track and field
- Events: 100 metres, 200 metres

Achievements and titles
- Personal bests: 100 m: 9.93 (Mito 2003) AR 200 m: 20.35 (Malmö 2006) 60 m (indoor): 6.69 (Lisbon 2001)
Medal record
Men's athletics
Representing Australia
Commonwealth Games
Bronze medal – third place	2002 Manchester	4 × 100 m relay

Patrick Johnson (born 26 September 1972 in Cairns, Queensland, Australia) is an Australian athlete of Aboriginal and Irish descent. He is the former Oceanian and Australian record holder in the 100 metres with a time of 9.93 seconds, which he achieved in Mito, Japan, on 5 May 2003, with the record standing for 23 years. With that time he became the first person not of African ancestry to break the 10-second barrier (Frankie Fredericks, a Namibian, had been the first non-West-African in 1991). The time made him the 17th-fastest man in history at the time and 38th man to crack the 10-second barrier. He was regarded as the fastest man of non-African descent before Christophe Lemaitre ran 9.92 seconds in French National Championships in Albi on 29 July 2011.

He reached the finals in both the 100 and 200 metres at the 2006 Commonwealth Games, and the 200 m final in the 2005 World Championships, where he finished 6th. He represented Australia at the Olympic Games in 2000. He finished his career with one Commonwealth Games medal: a bronze in the 4 × 100 metres relay at the 2002 Commonwealth Games.

== Personal life ==
Johnson's mother was a Kaanju Indigenous Australian and his father is of Irish descent. He was born on a speed boat en route to Cairns base hospital. His mother died when he was young, so he grew up on his father's mackerel trawler, and spent his childhood travelling the coast of Cape York with his siblings. A chance entry into a 100 m race in Queensland in his early 20s revealed his talent, and he later won a scholarship to attend the Australian Institute of Sport in Canberra. His career in athletics was somewhat shortened by his age, and he later worked in the Australian diplomatic service, and in Indigenous health.

In 2018, Johnson contributed a chapter entitled 'My Life's Voyage' to the 2018 biographical anthology Growing Up Aboriginal In Australia, edited by Anita Heiss and published by Black Inc.

== Personal bests ==
Event	Time	Wind	Venue	Date	Notes
Outdoor
100 m	9.93 s	+1.8 m/s	Mito, Japan	5 May 2003	Oceanian record
200 m	20.35 s	+1.0 m/s	Malmö, Sweden	22 August 2006	
Indoor
60 m	6.69 s		Lisbon, Portugal	11 March 2001	

== International competition record ==
Year	Competition	Venue	Position	Event	Notes
Representing Australia
1997	World Championships	Athens, Greece	52nd (h)	200 m	21.45 (wind: +1.1 m/s)
1999	Universiade	Palma de Mallorca, Spain	6th	200 m	21.06 (wind: -1.0 m/s)
2000	Olympics	Sydney, Australia	32nd (qf)	100 m	10.44 (wind: +0.2 m/s)
2000	Olympics	Sydney, Australia	28th (qf)	200 m	20.87 (wind: -0.2 m/s)
2000	Olympics	Sydney, Australia	– (sf)	4 × 100 m relay	DQ (relay leg: 4th)
2001	World Indoor Championships	Lisbon, Portugal	15th (sf)	60 m	6.69 PB
2002	Commonwealth Games	Manchester, United Kingdom	3rd	4 × 100 m relay	38.87 (relay leg: 4th)
2002	World Cup	Madrid, Spain	7th	100 m	10.58 (wind: -0.3 m/s)
2002	World Cup	Madrid, Spain	7th	4 × 100 m relay	39.58 (relay leg: 4th)
2003	World Championships	Saint-Denis, France	23rd (qf)	100 m	10.27 (wind: +0.7 m/s)
2003	World Championships	Saint-Denis, France	31st (qf)	200 m	20.83 (wind: +0.6 m/s)
2003	World Championships	Saint-Denis, France	13th (sf)	4 × 100 m relay	38.90 (relay leg: 2nd)
2004	Olympics	Athens, Greece	6th	4 × 100 m relay	38.56 (relay leg: 3rd)
2005	World Championships	Helsinki, Finland	23rd (qf)	100 m	10.48 (wind: -2.0 m/s)
2005	World Championships	Helsinki, Finland	6th	200 m	20.58 (wind: -0.5 m/s)
2005	World Championships	Helsinki, Finland	5th	4 × 100 m relay	38.32 (relay leg: 4th)
2006	Commonwealth Games	Melbourne, Australia	6th	100 m	10.26 (wind: +0.9 m/s)
2006	Commonwealth Games	Melbourne, Australia	4th	200 m	20.59 (wind: +0.5 m/s)
2006	Commonwealth Games	Melbourne, Australia	– (f)	4 × 100 m relay	DNF (relay leg: 4th)
2006	World Cup	Athens, Greece	8th	100 m	10.28 (wind: +1.1 m/s)
2006	World Cup	Athens, Greece	5th	200 m	20.52 (wind: +0.1 m/s)
2006	World Cup	Athens, Greece	6th	4 × 100 m relay	39.48 (relay leg: 2nd)
2007	World Championships	Osaka, Japan	17th (qf)	100 m	10.29 (wind: -0.6 m/s)
2007	World Championships	Osaka, Japan	16th (sf)	200 m	20.73 (wind: -0.4 m/s)
2010	Commonwealth Games	Delhi, India	7th (h)	4 × 100 m relay	39.53 (relay leg: 1st)

=== Track records ===
As of 6 September 2024, Johnson holds the following track records for 100 and 200 metres.

==== 100 metres ====
Location	Time	Windspeed m/s	Date
Bern	10.07	–0.3	28/06/2003
Mito, Ibaraki	9.93; AR	+1.8	05/05/2003
Perth, Western Australia	9.88	+3.6	08/02/2003

==== 200 metres ====
Location	Time	Windspeed m/s	Date
Campbelltown, New South Wales	20.26	+2.6	15/02/2003
