= Casnel Bushay =

Sprinter from Saint Vincent and the Grenadines

Personal information
- Born: Casnel Bushay; 15 November 1985 (age 39) Kingstown, Saint Vincent and the Grenadines

Sport
- Country: Saint Vincent and the Grenadines
- Sport: Track and field
- Event(s): 60 metres, 100 metres, 200 metres
- Updated on 26 August 2012

Casnel Bushay (born 15 November 1985) is a sprinter from Saint Vincent and the Grenadines.

Bushay was born in Kingstown. He competed at the 2004 CARIFTA Games in Hamilton. In the boys under 20s age group, he ran 11.43 seconds in the 100 metres, finishing fourth in his heat and failing to advance to the final. In the 200 metres, he finished eighth in a time of 22.11 seconds. In that race, he finished behind a young Usain Bolt who won with a time of 19.93 seconds, setting a new junior world record.

Bushay competed at the 2006 IAAF World Indoor Championships in Moscow for his native Saint Vincent and the Grenadines. On 10 March he ran a personal best time of 6.84 seconds in the 60 metres, finishing seventh in his heat and 35th overall.

Nine days later he competed at the 2006 Commonwealth Games in Melbourne. In the 100 metres he placed 30th after the second round, failing to advance to the semi-finals. He was also due to compete in the 200 metres, however he pulled out before his heat was run.
