= Oumar Loum =

Senegalese sprinter (born 1973)

Personal information
- Born: 31 December 1973 (age 52)

Sport
- Sport: Track and field
Medal record
Representing Senegal
African Championships
Gold medal – first place	1996 Yaoundé	200 m
Silver medal – second place	2002 Radès	4×100 m
Bronze medal – third place	1998 Dakar	200 m
Bronze medal – third place	2000 Algiers	200 m
Bronze medal – third place	2002 Radès	200 m
Bronze medal – third place	2002 Radès	4×400 m

Oumar Loum (born 31 December 1973) is a Senegalese former sprinter who specialized in the 200 metres. He competed at the Olympic Games three times, never progressing to the final.

== Competition record ==
Year	Competition	Venue	Position	Event	Notes
Representing Senegal
1992	Olympic Games	Barcelona, Spain	17th (h)	4×100 m relay	40.13
1992	World Junior Championships	Seoul, South Korea	4th	100 m	10.51 (0.0 m/s)
1993	Universiade	Buffalo, United States	12th (sf)	100 m	10.50 (w)
1993	Universiade	Buffalo, United States	4th	200 m	20.68 (w)
1993	World Championships	Stuttgart, Germany	16th (sf)	100 m	10.60
1993	World Championships	Stuttgart, Germany	33rd (h)	200 m	21.12
1994	Jeux de la Francophonie	Bondoufle, France	3rd	100 m	10.35
1994	Jeux de la Francophonie	Bondoufle, France	–	200 m	DNF
1996	African Championships	Yaoundé, Cameroon	1st	200 m	20.70
1996	Olympic Games	Atlanta, United States	22nd (qf)	200 m	21.31
1997	World Championships	Athens, Greece	43rd (h)	200 m	20.95
1998	African Championships	Dakar, Senegal	3rd	200 m	20.59
1999	All-Africa Games	Johannesburg, South Africa	8th	200 m	21.20
2000	African Championships	Algiers, Algeria	3rd	200 m	20.76
2000	Olympic Games	Sydney, Australia	20th (qf)	200 m	20.60
2001	World Indoor Championships	Lisbon, Portugal	10th (sf)	200 m	21.49
2001	Jeux de la Francophonie	Ottawa, Canada	5th	100 m	10.37
2001	Jeux de la Francophonie	Ottawa, Canada	2nd	200 m	20.59
2001	World Championships	Edmonton, Canada	34th (qf)	100 m	10.42
2001	World Championships	Edmonton, Canada	9th (qf)	200 m	20.43
2002	African Championships	Radès, Tunisia	3rd	200 m	20.37 (w)
2002	African Championships	Radès, Tunisia	2nd	4×100 m relay	40.08
2002	African Championships	Radès, Tunisia	3rd	4×400 m relay	3:14.40
2003	World Indoor Championships	Birmingham, United Kingdom	18th (h)	200 m	21.62
2003	World Championships	Paris, France	18th (qf)	200 m	20.67
2003	All-Africa Games	Abuja, Nigeria	4th	200 m	20.86
2003	All-Africa Games	Abuja, Nigeria	3rd	4×100 m relay	38.79
2003	Afro-Asian Games	Hyderabad, India	3rd	200 m	20.99
2003	Afro-Asian Games	Hyderabad, India	2nd	4×100 m relay	39.58
2004	African Championships	Brazzaville, Republic of the Congo	7th	200 m	21.43
2004	African Championships	Brazzaville, Republic of the Congo	4th	4×100 m relay	39.96
2004	African Championships	Brazzaville, Republic of the Congo	7th	4×400 m relay	3:10.61
2004	Olympic Games	Athens, Greece	37th (h)	200 m	20.97
2005	Islamic Solidarity Games	Mecca, Saudi Arabia	5th	100 m	10.52
2005	Islamic Solidarity Games	Mecca, Saudi Arabia	3rd	200 m	21.10
2005	World Championships	Helsinki, Finland	44th (h)	200 m	21.37
2005	Jeux de la Francophonie	Niamey, Niger	3rd	200 m	21.12
2005	Jeux de la Francophonie	Niamey, Niger	4th	4×100 m relay	40.36
2006	African Championships	Bambous, Mauritius	4th (sf)	200 m	20.99
2006	African Championships	Bambous, Mauritius	4th	4×100 m relay	40.54
2007	All-Africa Games	Algiers, Algeria	8th	200 m	21.77
2009	Jeux de la Francophonie	Beirut, Lebanon	21st (h)	200 m	24.59
2009	Jeux de la Francophonie	Beirut, Lebanon	3rd	4×100 m relay	39.87

== Personal bests ==
Outdoor

- 100 metres – 10.17 (-0.4) (Bamako 2002)
- 200 metres – 20.21 (+0.6) (Mexico City 2000)

Indoor

- 200 metres – 20.90 (Liévin 1995, 2001)
