= Isaac Jones (sprinter) =

Gambian sprinter (born 1990)

Isaac Jones (born 18 June 1990) is a Gambian sprinter.

Jones began his international career at the 2005 World Youth Championships in Athletics in Marrakesh, Morocco where he ran the 100 metres in a personal best time of 11.10 seconds. At the same event he reached the semi-finals of the 200 metres.

He competed for Gambia in the 200 metres at the 2006 Commonwealth Games in Melbourne, Australia. In round one, he finished third in his heat with a personal best time of 21.54 seconds. In round two, he finished sixth in his heat with a time of 21.78 seconds and failed to advance to the semi-finals.

In May 2008, at the 2008 African Championships in Athletics in Addis Ababa, Ethiopia, Jones narrowly missing the semi-finals of the 200 metres, covering the distance in 21.96 seconds. At the same event he also missed reaching the semi-finals of the 100 metres coming sixth in his heat with a time of 11.09 seconds.

Four years later in June 2012, Jones competed in the 200 metres at the 2012 African Championships in Athletics in Porto-Novo, Benin. He finished fifth in his heat with a time of 22.08 seconds. Earlier at the meet, Jones teamed up with Adama Jammeh, Assim Abdoule and Suwaibou Sanneh to race in the 4 × 100 metres relay. They finished fifth in their heat in a national record time of 40.42 seconds. In the final of relay the team was disqualified.
