= Jaysuma Saidy Ndure =

Gambian-Norwegian sprinter (born 1984)

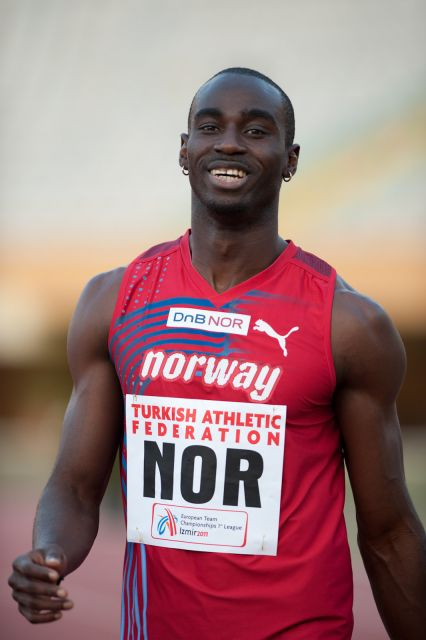
- Saidy Ndure at the 2011 European Team Championships (1st league)

Personal information
- Nationality: Gambia (–2006); Norway (2006–)
- Born: 1 January 1984 (age 42) Bakau, Gambia
- Height: 1.92 m (6 ft 4 in)

Sport
- Sport: Running
- Events: 100 metres, 200 metres
- Club: IL i BUL

Achievements and titles
- Personal bests: 100m: 9.99 s (2011); 200m: 19.89 s (2007)
Medal record
Men's athletics
Representing Gambia
African Championships
Bronze medal – third place	2004 Brazzaville	100 m
Representing Norway
European Championships
Bronze medal – third place	2012 Helsinki	100 m

Jaysuma Saidy Ndure (born 1 January 1984) is a Gambian-Norwegian sprinter. He is of Serer heritage of the noble Ndure family. In 2002, he went to Oslo, aged 18 and settled with his father who has lived in Norway since the 1970s. Having changed nationality from Gambia to Norway in 2006, he holds Norwegian records in the 100 and in the 200 metres, and is the seventh and fourth fastest European of all times on the two distances. He has a bronze medal from the African Championships and several top-three placings in IAAF Golden League meets and the IAAF World Athletics Final.

== Early and personal life ==
Saidy was born in Bakau, western Gambia, and raised by his mother. His first experience in the sprint events came in high school in his hometown. He reportedly took up the 200 metres event in order to avoid beating his friend, who already had taken up the 100 metres event. In June 2001 Saidy entered the West African Championships in Lagos, and won the 200 metres in 21.27. The result was a new Gambian record time. However, setting a national record did not inspire him to commence serious training, as he still preferred to play basketball and volleyball for fun with his schoolmates.

In 2002, Saidy moved to Oslo, Norway. A number of relatives already lived in the vicinity, most importantly Saidy's father who had lived in Norway since the 1970s. Searching for a leisure activity, Saidy decided to take up athletics again and joined one of the athletics clubs in the Norwegian capital, IL i BUL, whose training sessions were held in the internationally known Bislett stadion. Here, his talent was soon discovered and Saidy was put in contact with coach Olav Magne Tveitå, who still coaches him.

Saidy later established a relationship with Heidi Trollsås, a retired 400 m hurdler hailing from the Norwegian city Sandefjord who competed on the national level. The couple eventually moved to Blystadlia outside of Oslo, where they still live. Trollsås also functioned in the capacity of manager until 2008. Feeling that a professional agent was needed to handle Saidy's career, they hired noted Swedish athletics manager Daniel Westfeldt. Shortly thereafter Saidy signed a lucrative five-year contract with Nike.

== Athletic career ==
=== 2002 to 2003 ===
In 2002, the year Saidy came to Norway, he started competing more seriously in more international competitions. Eighteen years of age, he was in the age group to compete at the World Junior Championships in Kingston, Jamaica. He competed in the 200 metres, but did not progress past the first round with a fifth place in his heat. With the time of 21.53 seconds he finished fifth in his heat, behind such athletes as eventual bronze medalist Wes Felix and Leigh Julius. A week later Saidy entered the Commonwealth Games held in Manchester, England. Here he qualified for the next round for the first time, at the same time setting a new Gambian record of 21.25 seconds. He did exit in the next round after finishing fifth in the heat, the four best finishers in each heat progressing to the semi-finals. However, the quarter-final time of 21.20 seconds marked yet another Gambian record.

After arriving in Norway that summer, he tried the 100 metres and ran in 10.66 seconds in Drammen in August. In Norway alone, five athletes had better marks that season.

The 2003 season turned out to be another season with steady progression, but still without achieving the major international breakthrough. In July he broke his first Gambian 100 metres record, running in 10.52 seconds in Gothenburg. The old record was 10.54 seconds, set by Lamin Sanyang in May 2001 in Saidy's hometown Bakau. The next day he ran the 200 metres, and set his second Gambian record in two days with 21.18 seconds, this time in headwind.

At the 2003 African Junior Championships he won a bronze medal in the 100 metres and the 200 metres gold medal. In August Saidy competed at his first World Championships, still only 19 years old. The competition in the 2003 World Championships in Paris proved too tough, as Saidy once again failed to reach the second round. With 21.42 seconds, he finished sixth out of seven in a heat where eventual silver medalist Darvis Patton, among others, ran. Saidy did however have the fastest reaction time in his heat with 0.128 seconds.

On another note, in May Saidy he tried the 400 metres for the first time, clocking in 48.76 seconds in a local meet in Oslo. As of 2007, he has not run the distance again. Nonetheless, he has stated that the 400 metres might become his special event after turning 30 years old.

=== 2004 to 2005 ===
2004 would be the year when Saidy won his first international medal at senior level, and progressed significantly in both the short sprint events.

During the indoor season, he lowered his personal best in the 60 metres to 6.77 seconds, achieved in a February meet in Gothenburg. In late May he broke the 21-second barrier on the 200 metres, demolishing his own Gambian record with 20.69 seconds in Szombathely. During the same meet he also broke the 100 metres record twice in as many days, with 10.46 on 29 May and then 10.37 on 30 May. Two months later he won the bronze medal in the 100 metres event at the 2004 African Championships, clocking in 10.43 seconds and finishing behind Olusoji Fasuba and Idrissa Sanou. It was the third Gambian medal at the African Championships, following the two bronze medals at the 1996 edition. He did not place in the 200 metres at this championships.

In August, Saidy made his final preparations for his first Olympic Games participation. He showed great form by lowering the national 100 metres record yet again, first to 10.29 seconds in Malmö and then 10.27 seconds a week later in Lillehammer. The Olympic Games began three weeks later. The Gambian Olympic squad only consisting of two athletes, Saidy and female runner Adama Njie, Saidy was chosen as the Gambian flagbearer at the opening ceremony. He entered both the 100 and 200 metres, and for the first time, he progressed from the first round in a global international competition. Moreover, he did so in both events. The 100 metres event took place first. Here, Saidy lowered his record to 10.26 seconds as he progressed by finishing third in his heat, behind eventual silver medalist Francis Obikwelu and Ronald Pognon. In the quarter-final, however, 10.39 seconds was not enough to reach the next round. He finished in last place in his heat, this time having the slowest reaction time. In the 200 metres event, the first four finishers of each heat plus the four fastest times overall would qualify for the next round; with a fifth-place finish in the heat and a time of 20.78 seconds Saidy became the last athlete to qualify. Again, he ran in the heats with an eventual medalist, Shawn Crawford who went on to win the Olympic gold medal. The quarter-final saw Saidy finish sixth, failing to progress further.

His season debut in 2005 came at Florø on 4 June, where he ran the 100 metres in 10.53 seconds and the 200 metres in a mediocre 21.14 seconds. The main goal for the 2005 season was the World Championships. Unlike the Olympic Games the previous year, Saidy only competed in the 200 metres. He progressed comfortably from both the heat and the quarter-final. In the semi-final he ended fifth in his heat, 0.07 seconds behind Usain Bolt who with 20.68 seconds secured the last spot in the final.

Two months before the World Championships, he had set another Gambian record in the 200 metres, running in 20.57 seconds on 12 June in Warsaw. At the same meet he also clocked a season's best in the 100 metres of 10.31 seconds, which meant that he did not break the 100 m record in 2005. In July he ran under his 2004 record time on two further occasions. Only a week after the World Championships, he won a meet in Malmö to break the 200 metres record once more. The new record was 20.51 seconds.

=== 2006 to 2007 ===
The 2006 season began early, with the 2006 Commonwealth Games being held in March in Melbourne, Australia. Saidy ran a 10,56-second 100 metres on 9 March as a test, but did not compete in the 100 metres event at the Commonwealth Games which took place on 19 March. Instead he opted for the 200 metres event. Having progressed to the semi-final, he was eliminated there after placing fifth in his heat. He was only 0.04 seconds behind Uchenna Emedolu who secured the last final spot in that heat; the other heat saw three competitors finish in the range of 20.72–20.73 seconds, yet still advance to the final.

After the Commonwealth Games Saidy spent the next month training, before running a 20.89-second 200 metres in Dakar in late April. Two weeks later he improved to 20.59 seconds at the Super Grand Prix meet in Doha. He remained active through the summer, despite not entering the 2006 African Championships to defend his medal from 2004. Having run well at various Grand Prix meets, he collected enough points to finish fifth on the World Athletics Tour, thus enabling him to compete at the World Athletics Final for the first time. The 2006 World Athletics Final was held in Stuttgart, and Saidy made an international breakthrough as he finished sixth in the 200 metres in a new Gambian record time of 20.47 seconds.

This would be his last Gambian record. He had filed for Norwegian citizenship a few days before the World Athletics Final. The next month his citizenship application was accepted by the Norwegian Directorate of Immigration.

In 2007 he made his season debut with 20.62 in the 200 metres at the Super Grand Prix meet in May in Doha. He did not run the 100 metres until late June, when he achieved a mediocre 10.50 seconds in pouring rain during a national meet in Lillehammer. Another low-key 10.44 performance in Malmö the next week followed, but the meet was still successful as he broke his own best time in the 200 metres with a 20.41-second race. The display of form continued at the end of the month, as he finally broke his three-year-old personal best in the 100 metres, running in 10.10 seconds in Tallinn. In addition, he lowered his personal best time in the 200 metres to 20.25 seconds at the same meet. The news report titled "Norwegian record up next", he indeed lived up to the expectations: On 7 August he participated in both events at the DN Galan Super Grand Prix meet in Stockholm. He ran the 100 metres in 10.07 seconds, erasing the Norwegian record held by former European champion Geir Moen since 1996. The result was even achieved in a headwind of 1,0 m/s, leading him to believe that a time in the range of 9 seconds was achievable in a manner of time.

Eligible to compete in the Norwegian championships for the first time, Saidy won both short sprint events. On the first day of the championships, which were staged in mid-August in Askim, he ran the 100 metres in 10.14 seconds despite the drizzling and somewhat cold weather, beating the runner-up by more than half a second. For this result, he was awarded the King's Cup, a trophy given to the best male and female performer of the national championships. On the second day of the championships he won the 200 metres in a race he described as a "training session". However, he was not allowed to participate in the 2007 World Championships because of nationality issues. Instead, he opted to focus on the IAAF Golden League competitions in September.

On 7 September he participated in the Weltklasse Zürich meet, the first Golden League meet after a two-month break due to the World Championships. He finished second in 10.20 seconds, behind Francis Obikwelu as the starting field clocked in overall mediocre times. Two days later, he went to Rieti, Italy to compete against Asafa Powell among others. In splendid conditions with a 1.7 m/s tailwind, Powell set a new world record of 9.74 seconds in the qualifying heat while Saidy equaled his own Norwegian record with 10.07 seconds. The next week, it was time for the Memorial Van Damme Golden League meet in Brussels. Here, Saidy took another second place, again behind Asafa Powell, this time with 10.11 seconds. Two days later, at the ISTAF meet in Berlin Saidy showed consistency as he finished in 10.14 seconds, this time ahead of Marlon Devonish to win his first Golden League race. His success at these IAAF World Athletics Tour competitions ensured his qualification to compete in both sprint events at the World Athletics Final, held in Stuttgart one week after the ISTAF meet which had concluded the 2007 Golden League circuit.

At the 2007 IAAF World Athletics Final, Saidy finished second in the 100 metres and first in the 200 metres, setting new Norwegian records in both. In the 200 metres, he beat recent World Championships bronze medalist Wallace Spearmon to clock in 19.89 seconds. The result was described as a "huge surprise", whereas Saidy himself described the sub-20 second time as "crazy" and "unbelievable". The previous day he lowered his national 100 metres record to 10.06 seconds to finish second behind Asafa Powell, but after two false starts in the field the conditions were not optimal. These results propelled him to number four on the European all-time 200 metres list, only behind Pietro Mennea, Konstadinos Kederis and John Regis, and joint tenth place on the European all-time 100 metres list.

In September Saidy was nominated for the European athlete of the month award, but finished runner-up as Polish hurdler Marek Plawgo won the prize. In early 2008 he was declared Breakthrough Sportsperson of the Year in Norway, beating two female World Championships medalists in cross-country skiing. Attending a training camp in South Africa at that time, he was absent at the prize ceremony.

=== Controversies ===
==== Nationality ====
Since moving to live in Norway, a nationality change in order to represent his new home country was in the cards. In a newspaper interview, Saidy stated that he "is one hundred percent Norwegian". As an immigrant to Norway must wait for five years before getting a Norwegian citizenship, the process was fulfilled in December 2006, enabling him to compete at the Norwegian championships and to represent Norway in major international competitions such as the World Championships or Olympic Games. In his native Gambia, on the other hand, his new citizenship was described as a "shocking revelation". The Gambia Athletics Association, the Gambian National Olympic Committee and the Department of State for Youth and Sports were all reluctant to let him change nationality, as Saidy was deemed a "national hero" and a "national treasure".

Ultimately, Gambia opted to block Saidy's participation for Norway in major international championships for three years. This measure was created mainly to stop African athletes from pursuing careers in more wealthy nations, such as Olympic champion runner Saif Saaeed Shaheen who changed his allegiance from Kenya to Qatar. However, unlike Shaheen, Saidy was a naturalized Norwegian. Still, since leaving his Gambian citizenship behind, Saidy was not able to represent any nation at the 2007 World Championships, even while his name was accompanied by the Norwegian flag in the IAAF World Athletics Tour meetings. The Norwegian Athletics Association then hoped to get the block lifted in time for the 2008 Summer Olympics; this would depend on the approval of the Gambia Athletics Association.

In November 2007, it was reported that the disagreement had been resolved. The Norwegian Athletics Association and the Norwegian Olympic Committee and Confederation of Sports made an agreement with its Gambian counterpart, whose conditions included that Saidy would head a fourteen-day-long training camp for young athletes in his birth country. By the end of the year, only "formalities" remained as Saidy was presented as a part of the Norwegian elite athletics team for the first time.

In a 2008 television interview, he elaborated on his sense of nationality. While expressing a feeling of being both Gambian and Norwegian, he would emphasize the similarities between people rather than differences.

==== Doping case ====
In 2007, Saidy became the subject of a doping case. On 8 August, the IAAF reported that Saidy Jaysuna (sic) had tested positive for cannabis in an in-competition test on 28 June 2007 in Luzern, Switzerland. Saidy had competed in the Spitzenleichathletik EAA meeting there in both sprints events, running in 10.26 and 20.41 seconds respectively. Being a first violation, the only sanctions imposed on Saidy were disqualification from the competition in question as well as a public warning.

The news was not picked up by the Norwegian media until 14 August, two days after the Norwegian championships where Saidy won the King's Cup. The general secretary and the sports director of the Norwegian Athletics Association were unaware of the case, as was the Norwegian Anti-Doping Agency (Antidoping Norge). It was later discovered that the case had been sent to the Gambian Athletics Association. Saidy had been listed as a Gambian competitor in Luzern, even though he got Norwegian citizenship half a year ago. In September the case was transferred to the Norwegian authorities.

Reacting to the case, Saidy immediately blamed passive marijuana smoking sustained during a visit at a friend's house a few days before the Luzern meeting. He stated that he would never consume the substance knowingly, referring to the detrimental effects of cannabis on performances. The explanation was pulled in doubt as "very unlikely" by a doping expert in Norway, who claimed that passive smoking was not enough to affect a doping test. Others supported the explanation. In a similar case, Canadian snowboarder Ross Rebagliati originally lost his 1998 Olympic gold medal, but the medal was later returned; Rebagliati blamed passive smoking.

It was later revealed that Saidy had consumed the substance via attaya tea drinking at the same gathering with friends, one of whom admitted to preparing the tea with cannabis. This explanation was believed, and in December Saidy was acquitted by the Norwegian Anti-Doping Agency. The IAAF did however not accept the decision and gave Ndure the choice of accepting a public warning for an anti-doping rule violation in return for IAAF not appealing the case to CAS. Ndure accepted the public warning.

=== 2008 ===
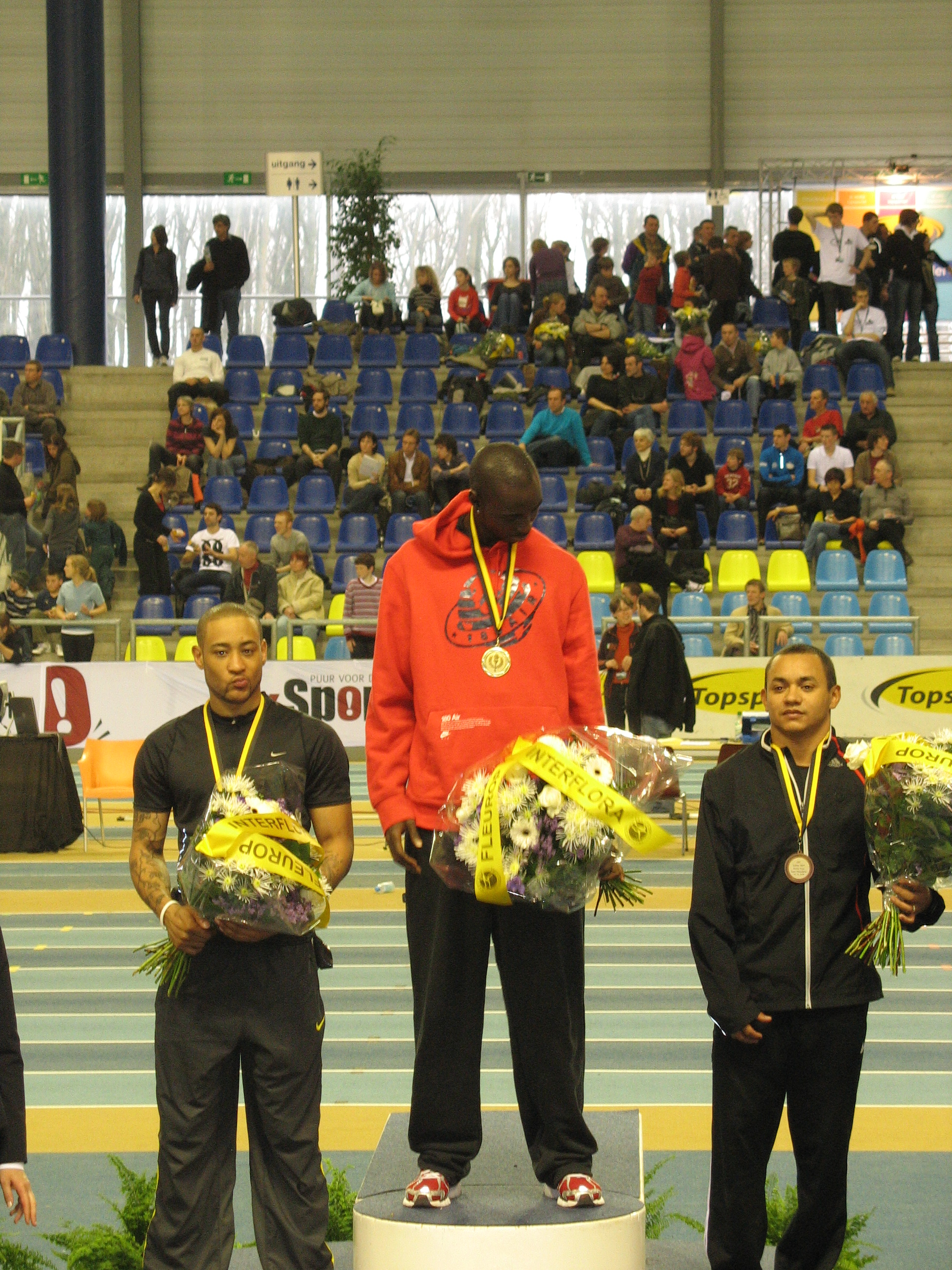
Jaysuma Saidy Ndure (middle) on the podium in Ghent

Unlike the previous year, Saidy decided to compete during the 2008 indoor season. He chose three 60 metres competitions in February. The first competition was held in Florø; here he was disqualified in the semi-final. In an unofficial extra race he clocked in 6.71 seconds, which would be a new Norwegian indoor record had the race been official. However, the next week Saidy ran in 6.56 seconds in Birmingham, England to lower the Norwegian record by 0.01 second. He had run in 6.58 seconds in the heats. Reportedly, he had potential for improvement as the start was not optimal. Finally, one week later in Ghent he lowered his own record by an additional 0.01 second as he won the race in 6.55 seconds.

To the surprise of the Norwegian Athletics Association, Saidy announced that he would not compete at the 2008 World Indoor Championships. According to his coach, the World Indoor Championships had a "low status" among the best sprinters, moreover Saidy wanted to prepare thoroughly for the 2008 Olympic season. Instead, he announced that he will commence the outdoor season on 9 May at the Super Grand Prix meet in Doha. Still, during a training camp in California in April, he joined a 4 x 100 metres relay team composed of runners from the USA Olympic Training Center in San Diego to clock in a world leading time of 38.72 seconds. The result equalled the time achieved by the United States "Blue" team, with Tyson Gay in its ranks, one week earlier.

On 9 May in Doha Saidy won the 100 metres race, in a new national record time of 10.01 seconds. His new record pushed him to a joint seventh place on the European all-time list. According to the IAAF reporter, this was "probably his most impressive 100m victory", considering not only the strong field of competitors, but also a suboptimal start. In addition, the last fifteen metres of the race were hampered by hamstring pains, with Saidy clutching his thigh as he crossed the finish line. As a result, he withdrew from the 200 metres race scheduled to be held later that evening. However, the injury was stated to be minor; Saidy was "not very worried".

Two weeks before the Bislett Games, which Saidy considered important in the Olympic preparations, it was reported that the injury was healed, and that Saidy would compete in both the 100 and the 200 metres. One week later, however, the reports were countered. Having not recovered fully from the injury, Saidy stated that he would compete no earlier than late June. His eyes were still fixed on the main goal for the 2008 season, the 2008 Summer Olympics. In Beijing he competed at the 100 metres sprint and placed 3rd in his heat after Derrick Atkins and Andrey Yepishin in a time of 10.37 seconds. He qualified for the second round in which he improved his time to 10.14 seconds. However, he was unable to qualify for the semi-finals as he finished in 4th place of his heat after Usain Bolt, Darvis Patton and Francis Obikwelu. He also took part in the 200 metres individual, finishing second in his first round heat, with a time of 20.54 seconds. With 20.45 seconds in the second round he placed third in his heat and he qualified for the semi-finals, however he did not show up at the start of the race.

Looking further into the future, he has stated that he might specialize in the 400 metres event. Being slimmer than many sprinters, he has a relatively low body mass index and does not train bench press to enhance his pectoral muscles. He weighed 74 kilograms after the training camp in California, but the goal was to lose at least 2 kilograms before the Olympic Games.

He ran at the 2009 World Championships in Athletics in Berlin, reaching the semi-finals of the 100 m. He went to the final of both the 100 m and 200 m at the 2010 European Athletics Championships, but finished in sixth and fifth place, respectively. He finished 3rd in the 100 m at the 2012 European Athletics Championships edition.

Olympic Games
Preceded by Adama N'Jie	Flagbearer for Gambia; Athens 2004	Succeeded by Badou Jack
