= Joseph Batangdon =

Cameroonian sprinter

Personal information
- Nationality: CMR
- Born: June 29, 1978 (age 48) Cameroon
- Height: 1.74
- Weight: 72.00

Sport
- Sport: Running
- Event: 200 m

Achievements and titles
- Personal bests: 60m: 6.89 100m: 10.19 (NR); 200m: 20.31 (NR) 400m: 46.50
Medal record
Men's athletics
Representing Cameroon
World Indoor Championships
Silver medal – second place	2003 Birmingham	200 m
All-Africa Games
Silver medal – second place	1999 Johannesburg	200 m
African Championships
Gold medal – first place	2004 Brazzaville	200 m
Silver medal – second place	2000 Algiers	200 m
Bronze medal – third place	2004 Brazzaville	4×100 m
Bronze medal – third place	2008 Addis Ababa	4×100 m

Joseph Batangdon (born July 29, 1978) is a former Cameroonian sprinter who specialized in the 200 metres.

Batangdon became African champion in 2004, a month before the 2004 Summer Olympics. Competing in the 200 metres contest, he did advance from the heats but pulled out of the competition.

== Competition record ==
Year	Competition	Venue	Position	Event	Notes
Representing Cameroon
1999	World Championships	Seville, Spain	21st (qf)	200 m	20.70
1999	World Championships	Seville, Spain	12th (h)	4 × 100 m relay	39.25 (NR)
1999	All-Africa Games	Johannesburg, South Africa	2nd	200 m	20.37
2000	African Championships	Algiers, Algeria	2nd	200 m	20.31
2000	Olympic Games	Sydney, Australia	37th (qf)	100 m	10.52
2000	Olympic Games	Sydney, Australia	17th (qf)	200 m	20.55
2000	Olympic Games	Sydney, Australia	24th (h)	4 × 100 m relay	39.62
2001	World Indoor Championships	Lisbon, Portugal	9th (sf)	200 m	21.43
2001	Jeux de la Francophonie	Ottawa, Canada	3rd	200 m	20.75
2001	World Championships	Edmonton, Canada	16th (sf)	200 m	20.66
2001	World Championships	Edmonton, Canada	17th (h)	4 × 100 m relay	39.29
2002	Commonwealth Games	Manchester, United Kingdom	15th (sf)	100 m	10.37
2002	Commonwealth Games	Manchester, United Kingdom	7th	200 m	20.36
2002	Commonwealth Games	Manchester, United Kingdom	7th	4 × 100 m relay	39.52
2002	African Championships	Radès, Tunisia	4th	200 m	20.47
2003	World Indoor Championships	Birmingham, United Kingdom	2nd	200 m	20.76
2003	World Championships	Paris, France	29th (qf)	200 m	20.81
2003	All-Africa Games	Abuja, Nigeria	6th	200 m	21.09
2003	All-Africa Games	Abuja, Nigeria	4th	4 × 100 m relay	39.94
2004	World Indoor Championships	Budapest, Hungary	4th	200 m	21.16
2004	African Championships	Brazzaville, Republic of the Congo	1st	200 m	20.46
2004	African Championships	Brazzaville, Republic of the Congo	3rd	4 × 100 m relay	39.87
2004	Olympic Games	Athens, Greece	34th (h)	200 m	20.92
2004	World Athletics Final	Monte Carlo, Monaco	7th	200 m	20.95
2005	Islamic Solidarity Games	Mecca, Saudi Arabia	2nd	200 m	20.73
2005	World Championships	Helsinki, Finland	22nd (qf)	200 m	21.38
2008	African Championships	Addis Ababa, Ethiopia	6th	200 m	21.24
2008	African Championships	Addis Ababa, Ethiopia	3rd	4 × 100 m relay	40.60
2009	Jeux de la Francophonie	Beirut, Lebanon	5th	4 × 100 m relay	40.07

=== Personal bests ===
==== Outdoor ====
Distance	Time	Venue	Date
100m	10.19s	Bordeaux, France	12/06/2002
200m	20.31s	Edmonton, Canada; Algiers, Algeria; Johannesburg, South Africa	07/08/2001; 14/07/2000; 17/09/1999
300m	32.44s	Sydney, Canada	11/09/2000
400m	46.5s	Nogent-sur-Marne, France	16/06/1996

==== Indoor ====
Distance	Time	Place
60m	6.89s	Liévin, France
200m	20.47s	Aubière, France
