= Omar Brown (sprinter, born 1982) =

Jamaican sprinter

Personal information
- Born: 21 June 1982 (age 44) Trelawny, Jamaica

Sport
- Sport: Track and field
- Club: Arkansas Razorbacks
Medal record
Representing Jamaica
Men's athletics
Commonwealth Games
Gold medal – first place	2006 Melbourne	200 m
CAC Junior Championships (U20)
Gold medal – first place	2000 San Juan	200 m
Gold medal – first place	2000 San Juan	4 × 100 m relay
CARIFTA Games Junior (U20)
Gold medal – first place	2000 St. George's	100 m
Gold medal – first place	2000 St. George's	200 m
Gold medal – first place	2000 St. George's	4 × 100 m relay
Silver medal – second place	1999 Fort-de-France	200 m
Bronze medal – third place	1999 Fort-de-France	100 m
CAC Junior Championships (U17)
Gold medal – first place	1998 George Town	100 m
Gold medal – first place	1998 George Town	200 m
Gold medal – first place	1998 George Town	4 × 100 m relay
CARIFTA Games Youth (U17)
Silver medal – second place	1998 Port of Spain	200 m

Omar O. Brown (born 21 June 1982 in Trelawny) is a Jamaican sprinter who specialises in the 200 metres.

He was successful as a junior athlete, winning the silver and bronze medals in the 200 m and 100 metres races at the 1999 World Youth Championships. The following year he finished fourth at the World Junior Championships. He ran collegiately for the University of Arkansas.

He won the 200 metres race at the 2006 Commonwealth Games, and was ranked ninth in the world for the 200 metres that year by Track and Field News magazine.

He suffered a setback in 2007 the form of an ankle injury. He returned at the 2008 Jamaican trials but suffered a hamstring injury, caused by a faulty technique due to pain in his ankle. He underwent surgery in September 2008 to remove a bone spur, but the scar tissue from the surgery hampered his track comeback. He did not return until the end of the 2009 season, taking fourth place in the 200 m at the Shanghai Golden Grand Prix.

== Personal life ==
On 3 November 2007, he married Jamaican Olympian Veronica Campbell.

== Personal bests ==
Event	Time (sec)	Venue	Date
60 metres	6.72	Lexington, Kentucky, United States	28 February 2004
100 metres	10.27	Kingston, Jamaica	21 July 2000
200 metres	20.33	Carson, California, United States	21 May 2006
400 metres	46.00	Walnut, California, United States	17 April 2005

- All information taken from IAAF profile.
