= Cameroon at the 2006 Commonwealth Games =

- CGF code: CMR
- CGA: National Olympic and Sports Committee of Cameroon
- Website: cnosc.com (in French)

in Melbourne, Australia
- Competitors: 24
- Flag bearers: Opening: Closing:
- Medals: Gold 0 Silver 1 Bronze 2 Total 3

Commonwealth Games appearances (overview)
- 1998; 2002; 2006; 2010; 2014; 2018; 2022; 2026; 2030

The Official Logo of the Cameroon Commonwealth Games Association

Cameroon was represented at the 2006 Commonwealth Games in Melbourne.

== Medals ==
| | (gold) | (silver) | (bronze) | Total |
|---|---|---|---|---|
| Cameroon | 0 | 1 | 2 | 3 |

=== Silver ===
- Brice Vivien Batchaya, Weightlifting, Men's 85 kg

=== Bronze ===
- Delphine Atangana, Athletics, Women's 100m
- Simplice Ribouem, Weightlifting, Men's 85 kg
