= Sierra Leone at the 2006 Commonwealth Games =

Sporting event delegation

Flag of Sierra Leone

Sierra Leone was represented at the 2006 Commonwealth Games in Melbourne by a 35-member strong contingent comprising 22 sportspersons and 13 officials.

== Missing athletes ==
On 22 March 2006 it was reported that seven athletes from Sierra Leone (three women and four men) had gone missing from the Commonwealth Games village. A further seven Sierra Leonean athletes also went missing during the course of the Games, bringing the total runaway count to fourteen (two thirds of the team).

Victoria Police believed that they had fled to Sydney where the Sierra Leonean community is much larger than Melbourne's. Eleven athletes from other nations (Cameroon, Bangladesh and Tanzania) had also fled the village.

On request of Sierra Leone officials, the Commonwealth Games Federation cancelled the missing athletes' Games accreditation, allowing the Australian Department of Immigration and Multicultural Affairs (DIMA) to cancel their visas at midnight on Monday 27 March, and begin investigating their disappearance.

At 7.20am on that day, New South Wales Police located six of the Sierra Leonean athletes in a house at Harbord near Manly Beach in Sydney. All six indicated they wished to seek political asylum in Australia, and were granted bridging visas by DIMA while their refugee applications were arranged. The athletes claimed to have been subjected to violence and torture in their home country; seventeen-year-old Isha Conteh stated she could be forced into female genital cutting if she returned (ABC News).

The remaining missing Sierra Leone athletes eventually turned themselves in to immigration officials in Sydney. They were all granted bridging visas.

== Medals ==
	(gold)	(silver)	(bronze)	Total
Sierra Leone	0	0	0	0
