= Sandy Walker =

American artist

Sandy Walker (born 1942) is an American artist and author who lives and works in Oakland, California. His work is included in the collections of the Whitney Museum, MoMA and the Smithsonian American Art Museum.
