= Gibrilla Bangura =

Sierra Leonean sprinter (born 1985)

Gibrilla Pato Bangura (born May 10, 1985) is a sprinter from Sierra Leone. He represented his country at the Commonwealth Games in 2002, 2006 and 2014.
