= Trinidad and Tobago at the 2006 Commonwealth Games =

- CGF code: TRI
- CGA: Trinidad and Tobago Olympic Committee
- Website: ttoc.org

in Melbourne, Australia
- Competitors: 71 in 10 sports
- Medals Ranked 33rd: Gold 0 Silver 0 Bronze 3 Total 3

Commonwealth Games appearances (overview)
- 1934; 1938; 1950; 1954; 1958; 1962; 1966; 1970; 1974; 1978; 1982; 1986; 1990; 1994; 1998; 2002; 2006; 2010; 2014; 2018; 2022; 2026; 2030

Trinidad & Tobago participated with a team of 71 athletes to the 2006 Commonwealth Games in Melbourne, winning three bronze medals and taking part in ten disciplines including athletics, badminton, gymnastics, hockey, shooting, table tennis and triathlon.

== Medals ==
	(gold)	(silver)	(bronze)	Total
Trinidad & Tobago	0	0	3	3

=== Bronze ===
1. Marc Burns, Athletics, Men's 100m
2. Roger Daniel, Shooting, Men's 50m Pistol
3. Cleopatra Borel-Brown, Shot put, Women's shot put

== Trinidad & Tobago's Team at the 2006 Commonwealth Games ==
=== Field Hockey ===
==== Men's team ====
- Glenn Francis
- Ron Alexander
- Akim Toussaint
- Damian Gordon
- Nicholas da Costa
- Solomon Eccles
- Kwandwane Browne
- Nigel Providence
- Atiba Whittington
- Wayne Legerton
- Nel Lashley
- Nicholas Wren
- Dwain Quan Chan
- Dillet Gilkes
- Calvin Alexander
- Darren Cowie

Head coach: David Francois

Source: Trinidad & Tobago Olympic Committee website

=== Triathlon ===
==== Women ====
- Kelly Mouttet
