= James Dolphin =

New Zealand sprinter (born 1983)

Personal information
- Full name: James William Dolphin
- Born: 17 June 1983 (age 43) Takapuna, New Zealand
- Height: 1.78 m (5 ft 10 in)
- Weight: 75 kg (165 lb)

Sport
- Country: New Zealand
- Sport: Athletics
- Event: Sprints
- Coached by: Marlon Gevaert

Achievements and titles
- Personal bests: 100 m: 10.41 200 m: 20.56 400 m: 46.72
- Updated on 7 January 2014

James William Dolphin (born 17 June 1983 in Takapuna) is a former New Zealand sprinter who competed internationally at the 2008 Summer Olympics and Commonwealth Games.

At the 2006 Commonwealth Games in Melbourne, Australia Dolphin finished eighth in the 200 metres final. At the 2008 Summer Olympics he finished sixth in his heat of the 200 metres and did not advance to the next round.

== Achievements ==
=== International competition ===
- 2007 World Championships Osaka 200m - Quarterfinalist
- 2006 Commonwealth Games Melbourne 200m - Finalist
- 2003 World Championships Paris Quarterfinalist
- 2002 World Junior Championships Kingston

=== New Zealand championships ===
- 2008 Senior Men 200m
- 2007 Senior Men 100m (1st=), Senior Men 200m
- 2006 Senior Men 100m, Senior Men 200m
- 2005 Senior Men 100m, Senior Men 200m
- 2003 Junior Men 200m
- 2002 Senior Men 100m

=== Personal bests ===
Distance	Time	Place	Date
100 m	10.41	Hamilton	2005
200 m	20.56	Sydney	2008
400 m	46.72	Auckland	2005
4 × 100 m relay	38.99 NR	Sydney	2005

=== World ranking ===
- 200 m - 2008: 66th

=== Personal progression ===
Distance	Time	Place	Date
200 m	20.56	Sydney	2008
	20.65	Osaka	2007
	20.72	Melbourne	2006
	20.60	Melbourne	2005
	20.86	Gent	2004
	20.69	Paris	2003
