= Mariuti Uan =

Mariuti Uan (born 22 January 1986) is a sprinter from Kiribati. He was his country's only athlete at the 2005 World Championships in Athletics, running an 11.92 +0.6 personal best. He later competed in the 2006 Commonwealth Games held in Melbourne, Australia, improving his personal best to 11.65 +1.3.

He qualified as the winner of the Kiribati trials in a hand timed 11.5 in February 2006. A month earlier the trials were interrupted by a minibus driving down the roadway used to conduct the trials race.
