= Aaron Egbele =

Nigerian sprinter

Personal information
- Born: 29 January 1979 (age 47) Benin City, Nigeria
Medal record
Men's athletics
Representing Nigeria
Olympic Games
Bronze medal – third place	2004 Athens	4x100 m
African Championships
Gold medal – first place	2004 Brazzaville	4×100 m

Aaron Egbele (born 29 January 1979, in Benin City) is a Nigerian sprinter. Egbele was a part of the Nigerian team that won the bronze medal in the 2004 Olympics 4 x 100 metres relay.

Egbele was an All-American sprinter for the UTEP Miners track and field team, placing 3rd in the 4 × 100 metres relay at the 2001 NCAA Division I Outdoor Track and Field Championships.

In the 2003 World Championships in Paris, he competed in both 100 and 200 metres, but was knocked out in the heats.
