= Aaron Armstrong =

American sprinter (born 1977)

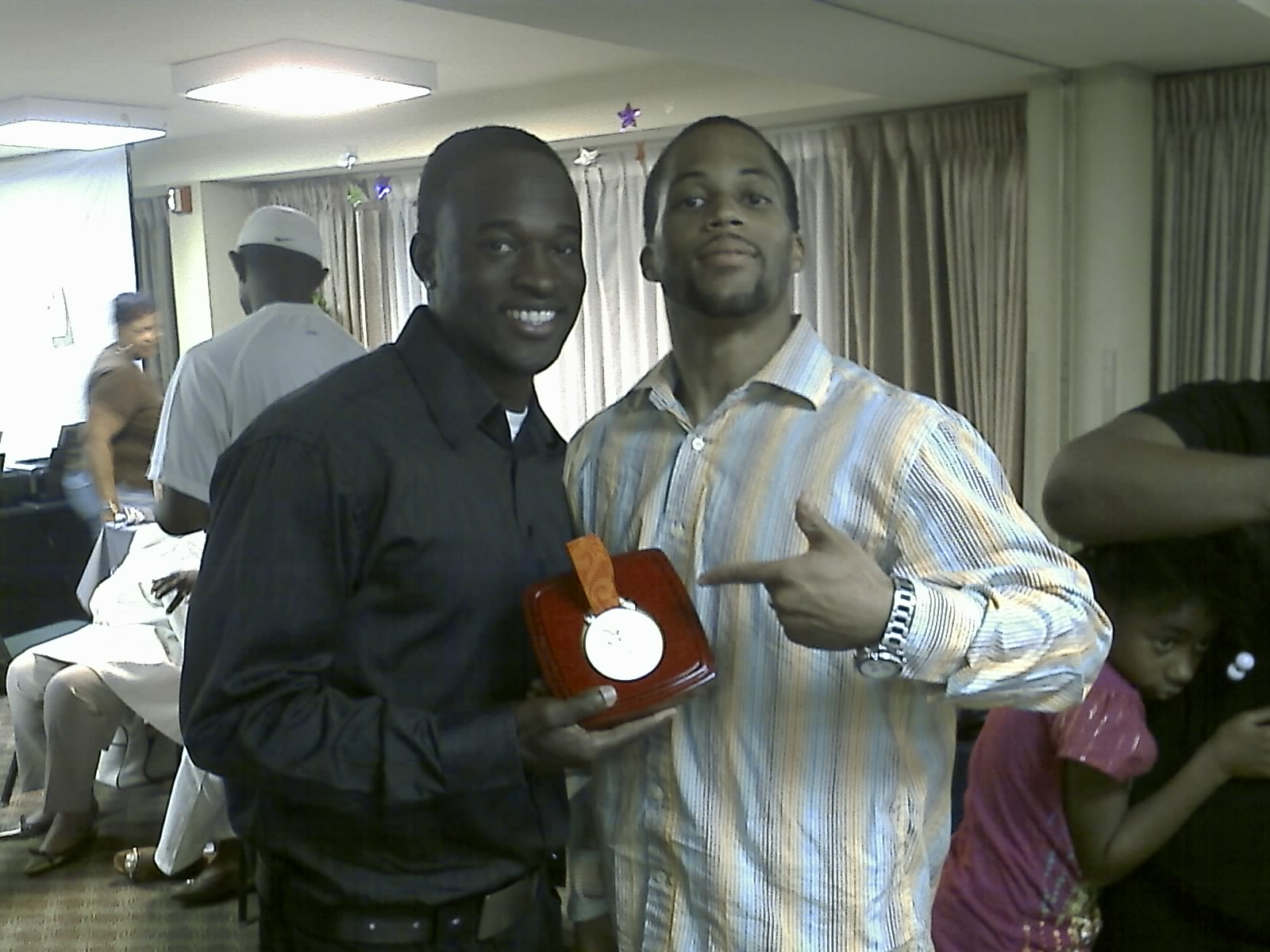
- Aaron Armstrong (left) holding his Olympic silver medal.

Personal information
- Full name: Aaron Nigel Armstrong
- National team: Trinidad and Tobago
- Born: 14 October 1977 (age 48) Houston, Texas
- Height: 5 ft 8 in (173 cm)
- Weight: 154 lb (70 kg)

Sport
- Sport: Track and field
- Events: 100 metres, 200 metres
- College team: University of Florida
Medal record
Men's athletics
Representing Trinidad
Olympic Games
Gold medal – first place	2008 Beijing	4 × 100 m relay
CAC Championships
Silver medal – second place	2011 Mayagüez	4 × 100 m relay
Commonwealth Games
Bronze medal – third place	2010 Delhi	100 m

Aaron Nigel Armstrong (born 14 October 1977) is a track and field sprint athlete who competes internationally for Trinidad and Tobago. He is the 2008 Olympic champion in 4 × 100 metres relay.

Armstrong attended the University of Florida in Gainesville, Florida, where he ran for the Florida Gators track and field team in NCAA competition. One of his first international medalling performances came at the 2005 Central American and Caribbean Championships: he won the 200 metres silver medal behind Usain Bolt and helped the Trinidad and Tobago team to the gold medal in the 4 × 100 metres relay. He reached the quarter-finals of the 200 metres at the 2005 World Championships in Athletics and was sixth in the 2005 IAAF World Athletics Final.

He was selected to represent his country at the 2006 Commonwealth Games and finished in fifth place in the 200 metres final. He helped his country retain the relay title at the 2008 Central American and Caribbean Championships, but he lost his place in the individual events to his national rivals Emmanuel Callender and Rondel Sorrillo (who won gold and silver).

Armstrong represented Trinidad and Tobago at the 2008 Summer Olympics in Beijing. He competed at the 4 × 100 metres relay together with Marc Burns, Keston Bledman and Richard Thompson. In their qualification heat they placed first in front of teams from Japan, the Netherlands and Brazil. Their time of 38.26 was the fastest of all sixteen teams participating in the first round and they qualified for the final. Armstrong was replaced by Emmanuel Callender for the final race and they sprinted to a time of 38.06 seconds, the second time after the Jamaican team, winning the silver medal. However, later on Jamaica were disqualified, and Trinidad and Tobago promoted to the gold medal. He also took part in the 200 metres individual, finishing first in his first round heat, with a time of 20.57 seconds. With 20.58 seconds in the second round he only placed fifth in his heat, which was not enough to qualify for the semi-finals.

He ran in the 200 metres at the 2009 World Championships in Athletics in Berlin, but he was eliminated in the first heats stage (although his time of 21.38 was a season's best). He took the bronze medal at the 2010 Commonwealth Games, finishing behind Lerone Clarke and Mark Lewis-Francis.

== Personal life ==
Armstrong is the son of Olympians Ainsley Armstrong and Debra Edwards-Armstrong.

Armstrong attended Wallace State Community College and Barton County Community College where he competed in the NJCAA. He later competed for the University of Florida in the NCAA.

== Personal bests ==
- 100 m – 10.03 (2009)
- 200 m – 20.08 (1999)
- 400 m hurdles – 51.68 (2002)

As of 14 November 2024, Armstrong holds the 200 metres track record for Meridian where on 3 April 1998 he clocked a time of 20.32 seconds with a following wind of 2.6 m/s.

== See also ==
- Florida Gators
- List of University of Florida Olympians
