= Evans Marie =

Seychellois sprinter (born 1983)

Evans Marie (born March 5, 1983) is a sprinter from Seychelles. He represented Seychelles at the 2004 Summer Olympics and the 2006 Commonwealth Games.
