= Christopher Williams (sprinter) =

Jamaican sprinter (born 1972)

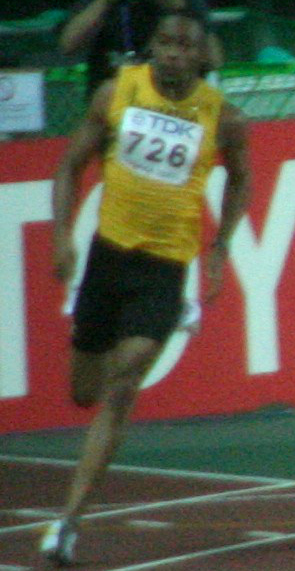
- Williams in 2007

Personal information
- Born: 15 March 1972 (age 54) Mandeville, Jamaica

Sport
- Sport: Track and field
Medal record
Representing Jamaica
Olympic Games
| Silver medal – second place | 2000 Sydney | 4x400 m relay |
World Championships
| Silver medal – second place | 2001 Edmonton | 200 m |
| Silver medal – second place | 2001 Edmonton | 4x400 m relay |
Pan American Games
| Silver medal – second place | 2003 Santo Domingo | 200m |
| Bronze medal – third place | 1999 Winnipeg | 4×100m |
CAC Championships
| Gold medal – first place | 1999 Bridgetown | 200 m |
| Bronze medal – third place | 2003 St George's | 200 m |
Central American and Caribbean Games
| Silver medal – second place | 2002 San Salvador | 200 m |

Christopher Williams (born 15 March 1972) is a retired Jamaican track and field sprinter who specialized in the 200 metres.

Williams is best known for winning the silver medal in the 200 metres at the 2001 World Championships. In 2001 he was named Jamaica Sportsman of the Year. Williams has competed in the Olympic Games three times, in 2000, 2004 and 2008, reaching the semi-finals of the 200m on all occasions. He was on the bronze medal-winning 4 x 400 metre relay team at the 2000 Olympics. He finished seventh in the 200m final at the 2007 World Championships.

Williams represented Jamaica at the 2008 Summer Olympics in Beijing. He competed at the 200 metres and placed third in his first round heat after Brian Dzingai and Christian Malcolm in a time of 20.53 seconds. He improved his time in the second round to 20.28 seconds and placed third again, this time after Dzingai and Walter Dix. He ran his semi final race in 20.45 seconds and placed sixth, which was not enough to make it to the Olympic final. Married to Cherilyn Williams

== Achievements ==
| Year | Competition | Venue | Position | Event | Notes |
|---|---|---|---|---|---|
| 1999 | Central American and Caribbean Championships | Bridgetown, Barbados | 1st | 200 metres | |
| 1999 | Pan American Games | Winnipeg, Canada | 3rd | 4 × 100 m relay | |
| 2000 | Summer Olympics | Sydney, Australia | 3rd | 4 × 400 m relay | |
| 2001 | World Indoor Championships | Lisbon, Portugal | 4th | 200 metres | |
| 2001 | World Championships | Edmonton, Canada | 2nd | 200 metres | |
| 2001 | World Championships | Edmonton, Canada | 2nd | 4 × 400 m relay | |
| 2002 | Central American and Caribbean Games | San Salvador, El Salvador | 2nd | 200 metres | 21.04 (wind: -0.4 m/s) |
| 2003 | Pan American Games | Santo Domingo, Dominican Republic | 2nd | 200 metres | |
| 2003 | Central American and Caribbean Championships | St. George's, Grenada | 3rd | 200 metres | |
| 2005 | World Athletics Final | Monte Carlo, Monaco | 2nd | 200 metres | |
| 2006 | Commonwealth Games | Melbourne, Australia | 3rd | 200 metres | |

== See also ==
- List of doping cases in athletics
