= Sherwin Vries =

South African sprinter

Personal information
- Born: 22 March 1980 (age 46) Walvis Bay, South Africa

Sport
- Sport: Track and field
Medal record
Representing South Africa
Commonwealth Games
Silver medal – second place	2006 Melbourne	4x100 m relay
African Championships
Silver medal – second place	2006 Bambous	4×100 m relay

Sherwin Marchel Vries (born 22 March 1980) is a sprinter who represents South Africa after switching from Namibia in 2003.

He finished fifth at the 2001 Summer Universiade and fourth at the 2006 African Championships in Athletics, both over 200 metres. He also reached the semi-final at the 2003 World Championships in Athletics.

At the 2001 Universiade he also competed for the Namibian 4 x 100 metres relay team who set a national record of 39.48 seconds.
