= Uchenna Emedolu =

Nigerian sprinter (born 1976)

Personal information
- Nationality: Nigerian
- Born: 17 September 1976 (age 49) Adazi-Ani, Aniocha, Delta, Nigeria
- Height: 183 cm (6 ft 0 in)
- Weight: 87 kg (192 lb)

Sport
- Sport: Athletics
- Event: Sprints
- Club: Woodford Green with Essex Ladies; SL Benfica
Medal record
Men's athletics
Representing Nigeria
Olympic Games
Bronze medal – third place	2004 Athens	4×100 m
All-Africa Games
Gold medal – first place	2003 Abuja	200 m
African Championships
Gold medal – first place	2002 Radès	4×100 m
Gold medal – first place	2006 Bambous	200 m
Gold medal – first place	2006 Bambous	4×100 m
Silver medal – second place	2002 Radès	100 m
Silver medal – second place	2006 Bambous	100 m
Silver medal – second place	2008 Addis Ababa	100 m

Uchenna Emedolu (born 17 September 1976) is a Nigerian retired athlete who specialised in short-distance sprints, particularly the 100 metres and the 200 metres. In 100 metres his personal best time is 9.97 seconds, achieved at the 2003 All-Africa Games where he finished second. This ranks him ninth in Nigeria, behind Olusoji Fasuba, Divine Oduduru, Seun Ogunkoya, Davidson Ezinwa, Olapade Adeniken, Deji Aliu, Raymond Ekevwo and Francis Obikwelu.

Emedolu participated in the 2000, 2004 and 2008 Summer Olympics. In 2004 he achieved a semi-final place in the individual 100 metres. Together with Olusoji Fasuba, Aaron Egbele and Deji Aliu he won the bronze medal in the 4 × 100 metres relay. The 2008 Summer Olympics in Beijing were less successful. In the individual event he did only finish in fourth place in the first rounds heat 10.46 seconds and was eliminated. In the 4 × 100 metres relay he, together with Onyeabor Ngwogu, Obinna Metu and Chinedu Oriala did not finish the race in the heats due to a mistake.

== Statistics ==
=== Personal bests ===
Event	Date	Venue	Time (seconds)
60 metres	3 February 2002	Stuttgart, Germany	6.66
100 metres	12 October 2003	Abuja, Nigeria	9.97
200 metres	8 September 2002	Rieti, Italy	20.31

- All information taken from IAAF Profile.
