= 2001 World Championships in Athletics – Men's 4 × 100 metres relay =

These are the official results of the Men's 4 × 100 metres relay event at the 2001 IAAF World Championships in Edmonton, Alberta, Canada. Their final was held on Sunday 12 August 2001 at 17:10.

== Records ==
Standing records prior to the 2001 World Athletics Championships
World record	United States (Michael Marsh, Leroy Burrell, Dennis Mitchell, Carl Lewis); United States (Jon Drummond, André Cason, Dennis Mitchell, Leroy Burrell)	37.40	August 8, 1992; August 21, 1993	Barcelona, Spain; Stuttgart, Germany
Championships record	United States (Jon Drummond, André Cason, Dennis Mitchell, Leroy Burrell)	37.40	August 21, 1993	Stuttgart, Germany
Season best	(United States) Hudson Smith International (Jon Drummond, Bernard Williams, Joshua J. Johnson, Maurice Greene)	37.81	April 7, 2001	Austin, United States

== Final ==
Rank	Nation	Athletes	Time
1st place, gold medalist(s)	South Africa (RSA)	• Morné Nagel • Corné du Plessis • Lee-Roy Newton • Mathew Quinn	38.47 (NR)
2nd place, silver medalist(s)	Trinidad and Tobago (TRI)	• Marc Burns • Ato Boldon • Jaycey Harper • Darrel Brown	38.58 (NR)
3rd place, bronze medalist(s)	Australia (AUS)	• Adam Basil • Paul Di Bella • Steve Brimacombe • Matthew Shirvington	38.83
4.	Japan (JPN)	• Ryo Matsuda • Shingo Suetsugu • Toshiyuki Fujimoto • Nobuharu Asahara	38.96
5.	Ivory Coast (CIV)	• Jean-Marie Irie • Ahmed Douhou • Yves Sonan • Eric Pacome N'Dri	39.18
6.	Poland (POL)	• Ryszard Pilarczyk • Łukasz Chyła • Piotr Balcerzak • Marcin Jędrusiński	39.71
—	Brazil (BRA)	• Cláudio Sousa • Edson Ribeiro • André da Silva • Claudinei da Silva	DNF
—	United States (USA)	• Mickey Grimes • Bernard Williams • Dennis Mitchell • Tim Montgomery	DQ

== Semifinals ==
- Held on Sunday 12 August 2001

=== Heat 1 ===
Rank	Nation	Athletes	Time
1.	Brazil (BRA)	• Cláudio Sousa • Edson Ribeiro • André da Silva • Claudinei da Silva	38.23
2.	Japan (JPN)	• Ryo Matsuda • Shingo Suetsugu • Toshiyuki Fujimoto • Nobuharu Asahara	38.54
3.	Ivory Coast (CIV)	• Ibrahim Meité • Ahmed Douhou • Yves Sonan • Eric Pacome N'Dri	38.60 (NR)
4.	South Africa (RSA)	• Morne Nagel • Corne du Plessis • Lee-Roy Newton • Mathew Quinn	38.63
5.	Italy (ITA)	• Francesco Scuderi • Marco Torrieri • Maurizio Checcucci • Andrea Colombo	38.71
6.	Saudi Arabia (KSA)	• Yahya Al-Gahes • Mubarak Ata Mubarak • Salem Mubarak Al-Yami • Jamal Abd. Al-Saffar	39.04 (NR)
7.	Israel (ISR)	• Kfir Golan • Tommy Kafri • Gideon Yablonka • Aleksandr Porkhomovskiy	39.39
—	France (FRA)	• Fabrice Calligny • Frédéric Krantz • Christophe Cheval • David Patros	DQ

=== Heat 2 ===
Rank	Nation	Athletes	Time
1.	Trinidad and Tobago (TRI)	• Marc Burns • Ato Boldon • Jaycey Harper • Darrel Brown	38.76
2.	Poland (POL)	• Ryszard Pilarczyk • Łukasz Chyła • Piotr Balcerzak • Marcin Urbaś	38.92
3.	Australia (AUS)	• Matthew Shirvington • Paul Di Bella • Steve Brimacombe • Adam Basil	38.97
4.	Nigeria (NGR)	• Taiwo Bamidele • Chinedu Oriala • Tamunosiki Atorudibo • Uchenna Emedolu	39.05
5.	Canada (CAN)	• Nicolas Macrozonaris • Glenroy Gilbert • Jermaine Joseph • Anson Henry	39.16
6.	Bahamas (BAH)	• Renward Wells • Andrew Tynes • Iram Lewis • Dominic Demeritte	39.20
7.	Mauritius (MRI)	• Arnaud Casquette • Eric Milazar • Fernando Augustin • Stéphane Buckland	39.25
—	United States (USA)	• Mickey Grimes • Bernard Williams • Dennis Mitchell • Tim Montgomery	DQ

== Heats ==
- Held on Saturday 11 August 2001

=== Heat 1 ===
Rank	Nation	Athletes	Time
1.	Brazil (BRA)	• Cláudio Sousa • Edson Ribeiro • André da Silva • Claudinei da Silva	38.44
2.	Trinidad and Tobago (TRI)	• Marc Burns • Ato Boldon • Jaycey Harper • Darrel Brown	38.60
3.	Poland (POL)	• Ryszard Pilarczyk • Łukasz Chyła • Piotr Balcerzak • Marcin Urbaś	38.79
—	Venezuela (VEN)	• Juan Morillo • William Hernández • José Carabalí • Hely Ollarves	DQ
—	Thailand (THA)	• Kongdech Natenee • Vissanu Sophanich • Ekkachai Janthana • Reanchai Seehawong	DQ
—	Benin (BEN)	• Anziz Itchaou • Pascal Dangbo • Arcadius Fanou • Souhalia Alamou	DNS

=== Heat 2 ===
Rank	Nation	Athletes	Time
1.	United States (USA)	• Jon Drummond • Mickey Grimes • Dennis Mitchell • Joshua J. Johnson	38.35
2.	Japan (JPN)	• Ryo Matsuda • Shingo Suetsugu • Toshiyuki Fujimoto • Nobuharu Asahara	38.67
3.	France (FRA)	• Fabrice Calligny • Frédéric Krantz • David Patros • Needy Guims	38.97
4.	Nigeria (NGR)	• Taiwo Bamidele • Chinedu Oriala • Sunday Emmanuel • Uchenna Emedolu	39.10
5.	Belgium (BEL)	• Bongelemba Bongelo • Anthony Ferro • Kevin Rans • Erik Wijmeersch	39.22
—	Germany (GER)	• Rasgawa Pinnock • Steffen Otto • Alexander Kosenkow • Tim Goebel	DQ
—	Liberia (LBR)	• Kouty Mawenh • Sayon Cooper • Sultan Tucker • Koiyan Morlu	DNF

=== Heat 3 ===
Rank	Nation	Athletes	Time
1.	Canada (CAN)	• Okiki Akinremi • Glenroy Gilbert • Jermaine Joseph • Nicolas Macrozonaris	38.83
2.	Australia (AUS)	• Matthew Shirvington • Paul Di Bella • Steve Brimacombe • Adam Basil	38.96
3.	Italy (ITA)	• Francesco Scuderi • Marco Torrieri • Maurizio Checcucci • Andrea Colombo	38.97
4.	Saudi Arabia (KSA)	• Mohamed Al-Yami • Mubarak Ata Mubarak • Salem Mubarak Al-Yami • Jamal Abd. Al-Saffar	39.15
5.	Bahamas (BAH)	• Renward Wells • Andrew Tynes • Iram Lewis • Dominic Demeritte	39.16
6.	Jamaica (JAM)	• Julien Dunkley • Dwight Thomas • Christopher Williams • Ricardo Williams	40.05

=== Heat 4 ===
Rank	Nation	Athletes	Time
1.	South Africa (RSA)	• Morne Nagel • Corne Du Plessis • Lee-Roy Newton • Mathew Quinn	38.72
2.	Ivory Coast (CIV)	• Ibrahim Meité • Ahmed Douhou • Yves Sonan • Eric Pacome N'Dri	38.74
3.	Mauritius (MRI)	• Arnaud Casquette • Eric Milazar • Fernando Augustin • Stéphane Buckland	38.99 (NR)
4.	Israel (ISR)	• Kfir Golan • Tommy Kafri • Gideon Yablonka • Aleksandr Porkhomovskiy	39.13
5.	Cameroon (CMR)	• Alfred Moussambani • Serge Bengono • Joseph Batangdon • Claude Toukene	39.29
—	Cuba (CUB)	• José A. César • Luis Alberto Pérez-Rionda • Iván García • Freddy Mayola	DNF
—	Great Britain (GBR)	• Dwain Chambers • Marlon Devonish • Christian Malcolm • Jonathan Barbour	DNF
