= 2003 World Championships in Athletics – Men's 4 × 100 metres relay =

These are the official results of the Men's 4 × 100 metres relay event at the 2003 IAAF World Championships in Paris, France. Their final was held on 31 August 2003 at 17:50h.

== Final ==
RANK	NATION	ATHLETES	TIME
	United States (USA)	• John Capel • Bernard Williams • Darvis Patton • Joshua J. Johnson	38.06
	Brazil (BRA)	• Vicente de Lima • Édson Luciano Ribeiro • André da Silva • Cláudio Roberto Souza	38.26
	Netherlands (NED)	• Timothy Beck • Troy Douglas • Patrick van Balkom • Caimin Douglas	38.87
4.	Nigeria (NGR)	• Olusoji Fasuba • Uchenna Emedolu • Musa Deji • Deji Aliu	38.89
5.	Poland (POL)	• Piotr Balcerzak • Łukasz Chyła • Marcin Nowak • Marcin Urbaś	38.96
6.	Japan (JPN)	• Hiroyasu Tsuchie • Hisashi Miyazaki • Ryo Matsuda • Nobuharu Asahara	39.05
—	Great Britain (GBR)	• Christian Malcolm • Darren Campbell • Marlon Devonish • Dwain Chambers	DQ
—	Jamaica (JAM)	• Ricardo Williams • Dwight Thomas • Michael Frater • Asafa Powell	DNF

== Semifinals ==
- Held on Saturday 2003-08-30

=== Heat 1 ===
RANK	NATION	ATHLETES	TIME
1.	United States (USA)	• John Capel • Bernard Williams • Darvis Patton • Joshua J. Johnson	37.99
2.	Jamaica (JAM)	• Ricardo Williams • Dwight Thomas • Michael Frater • Asafa Powell	38.45
3.	Poland (POL)	• Marcin Krzywański • Łukasz Chyła • Marcin Nowak • Marcin Jędrusiński	38.50
4.	Japan (JPN)	• Hiroyasu Tsuchie • Hisashi Miyazaki • Ryo Matsuda • Nobuharu Asahara	38.58
5.	Netherlands (NED)	• Timothy Beck • Troy Douglas • Patrick van Balkom • Caimin Douglas	38.63
6.	Trinidad and Tobago (TRI)	• Marc Burns • Ato Boldon • Jaycey Harper • Niconnor Alexander	38.84
7.	Ghana (GHA)	• Christian Nsiah • Eric Nkansah • Aziz Zakari • Leonard Myles-Mills	38.88
8.	Italy (ITA)	• Francesco Scuderi • Simone Collio • Massimiliano Donati • Alessandro Cavallaro	38.93

=== Heat 2 ===
RANK	NATION	ATHLETES	TIME
1.	Brazil (BRA)	• Vicente de Lima • Édson Luciano Ribeiro • André da Silva • Cláudio Roberto Souza	38.50
2.	Nigeria (NGR)	• Musa Deji • Uchenna Emedolu • Olusoji Fasuba • Deji Aliu	38.58
3.	Canada (CAN)	• Charles Allen • Anson Henry • Jermaine Joseph • Pierre Browne	38.66
4.	France (FRA)	• Ronald Pognon • Issa-Aimé Nthépé • Frédéric Krantz • Jérôme Éyana	38.79
5.	Australia (AUS)	• Matthew Shirvington • Patrick Johnson • Paul Di Bella • Adam Basil	38.90
—	Great Britain (GBR)	• Christian Malcolm • Darren Campbell • Marlon Devonish • Dwain Chambers	DQ
—	Germany (GER)	• Tobias Unger • Marc Blume • Alexander Kosenkow • Ronny Ostwald	DNF
—	Dominican Republic (DOM)	• Juan Encarnación • Luis Morillo • Juan Sainfleur • Yoel Baez	DNF

== Heats ==
- Held on Saturday 2003-08-30

=== Heat 1 ===
RANK	NATION	ATHLETES	TIME
1.	United States (USA)	• John Capel • Bernard Williams • Darvis Patton • Joshua J. Johnson	38.28
2.	France (FRA)	• Ronald Pognon • Issa-Aimé Nthépé • Frédéric Krantz • Jérôme Éyana	38.61
3.	Germany (GER)	• Tobias Unger • Marc Blume • Alexander Kosenkow • Ronny Ostwald	38.91
4.	Ghana (GHA)	• Christian Nsiah • Eric Nkansah • Aziz Zakari • Leonard Myles-Mills	38.94
5.	Dominican Republic (DOM)	• Juan Encarnación • Luis Morillo • Juan Sainfleur • Yoel Baez	39.01
6.	China (CHN)	• Shen Yunbao • He Jun • Yang Yaozu • Chen Haijian	39.28
—	Hungary (HUN)	• Zsolt Szeglet • Géza Pauer • Gábor Dobos • Miklós Gyulai	DQ

=== Heat 2 ===
RANK	NATION	ATHLETES	TIME
1.	Brazil (BRA)	• Vicente de Lima • Édson Luciano Ribeiro • André da Silva • Cláudio Roberto Souza	38.53
2.	Nigeria (NGR)	• Musa Deji • Tamunosiki Atorudibo • Olusoji Fasuba • Deji Aliu	38.76
3.	Japan (JPN)	• Hiroyasu Tsuchie • Hisashi Miyazaki • Ryo Matsuda • Nobuharu Asahara	38.77
4.	Belgium (BEL)	• Nathan Bongelo • Anthony Ferro • Kristof Beyens • Xavier de Baerdemaeker	39.05; NR
—	Cameroon (CMR)	• Alfred Moussambani • Serge Bengono • Jean-Francis Ngapout • Joseph Batangdon	DQ
—	Cyprus (CYP)	• Constantinos Kokkinos • Anthimos Rotos • Neophytos Michael-Kyriacou • Prodromos Katsantonis	DQ
—	Ukraine (UKR)	• Kostyantyn Vasyukov • Kostyantyn Rurak • Oleksandr Kaydash • Dmytro Hlushchenko	DQ

=== Heat 3 ===
RANK	NATION	ATHLETES	TIME
1.	Poland (POL)	• Marcin Krzywański • Łukasz Chyła • Marcin Nowak • Marcin Jędrusiński	38.52
2.	Netherlands (NED)	• Timothy Beck • Troy Douglas • Patrick van Balkom • Guus Hoogmoed	38.72
3.	Jamaica (JAM)	• Julien Dunkley • Dwight Thomas • Michael Frater • Ricardo Williams	38.84
4.	Trinidad and Tobago (TRI)	• Marc Burns • Ato Boldon • Jaycey Harper • Niconnor Alexander	38.89
5.	New Zealand (NZL)	• Dallas Roberts • Chris Donaldson • James Dolphin • Donald MacDonald	39.25
6.	Oman (OMA)	• Fahad Khamis Said Al Jabri • Hamoud Abdallah Al-Dalhami • Mohamed Al-Shikeili • Juma Mubarak Al-Jabri	40.65

=== Heat 4 ===
RANK	NATION	ATHLETES	TIME
1.	Italy (ITA)	• Francesco Scuderi • Simone Collio • Massimiliano Donati • Alessandro Cavallaro	38.63
2.	Canada (CAN)	• Rhoan Sterling • Anson Henry • Charles Allen • Pierre Browne	38.72
3.	Australia (AUS)	• Matthew Shirvington • Patrick Johnson • Paul Di Bella • Adam Basil	38.76
4.	Ivory Coast (CIV)	• Marius Loua • Ibrahim Meité • Yves Sonan • Eric Pacome N'Dri	39.34
5.	Liberia (LBR)	• Sayon Cooper • Kouty Mawenh • Joseph Brent • Abraham Koiyan Morlu	40.08
—	Great Britain (GBR)	• Christian Malcolm • Dwain Chambers • Marlon Devonish • Mark Lewis-Francis	DQ
—	Saudi Arabia (KSA)	• Kalifa Al-Saker • Yahya Al-Gahes • Salem Mubarak Al-Yami • Mubarak Ata Mubarak	DNF
