= Athletics at the 2002 Commonwealth Games – Men's 4 × 100 metres relay =

Men's running race held in 2002

Men's 4 × 100 metres relay at the Commonwealth Games

The men's 4 × 100 metres relay event at the 2002 Commonwealth Games was held on July 30–31.

== Medalists ==
Gold	Silver	Bronze
England; Jason Gardener; Marlon Devonish; Allyn Condon; Darren Campbell	Jamaica; Michael Frater; Dwight Thomas; Christopher Williams; Asafa Powell; LaTonel Williams*	Australia; Tim Williams; Paul di Bella; David Baxter; Patrick Johnson

* Athletes who competed in heats only and received medals.

== Results ==
=== Heats ===
Qualification: First 3 teams of each heat (Q) plus the next 2 fastest (q) qualified for the final.

Rank	Heat	Nation	Athletes	Time	Notes
1	1	Nigeria	Taiwo Ajibade, Chinedu Oriala, Sunday Emmanuel, Uchenna Emedolu	38.95	Q
2	2	Jamaica	Michael Frater, Dwight Thomas, Asafa Powell, LaTonel Williams	39.05	Q
3	1	England	Jason Gardener, Marlon Devonish, Allyn Condon, Darren Campbell	39.06	Q
4	2	Trinidad and Tobago	Marvin Regis, Marc Burns, Jacey Harper, Julian Raeburn	39.16	Q
5	2	Australia	Tim Williams, Paul di Bella, David Baxter, Patrick Johnson	39.24	Q
6	1	Canada	Nick Macrozonaris, Pierre Browne, Jermaine Joseph, Bruny Surin	39.51	Q
7	2	Wales	Kevin Williams, Douglas Turner, Jamie Henthorn, Christian Malcolm	39.62	q
8	1	Cameroon	Alfred Moussambani, Serge Bengono, Claude Toukene, Joseph Batangdon	39.71	q
9	1	Sierra Leone	Aiah Yambasu, Joselyn Thomas, Gibril Bangura, Thomas Ganda	40.00	
10	1	Mauritius	Jonathan Chimier, Ommanandsingh Kowlessur, Fernando Augustin, Eric Milazar	40.05	
11	2	Niue	Billi Paea, Afele Leona, Lupo Kumitau, Mathew Faleuka	42.95	NR
	1	Gambia	Ousman Jatta, Lamin Sanyang, Yusupha Bojang, Jaysuma Saidy Ndure	DQ	
	2	South Africa	Morné Nagel, Corne du Plessis, Lee-Roy Newton, Mathew Quinn	DQ	
	2	British Virgin Islands	Steve Augustine, Deon Crabbe, Alliston Potter, Keita Cline	DNF	

=== Final ===
Rank	Nation	Athletes	Time	Notes
1st place, gold medalist(s)	England	Jason Gardener, Marlon Devonish, Allyn Condon, Darren Campbell	38.62	
2nd place, silver medalist(s)	Jamaica	Michael Frater, Dwight Thomas, Christopher Williams, Asafa Powell	38.62	
3rd place, bronze medalist(s)	Australia	Tim Williams, Paul di Bella, David Baxter, Patrick Johnson	38.87	
4	Canada	Charles Allen, Anson Henry, Jermaine Joseph, Bruny Surin	38.94	
5	Trinidad and Tobago	Marvin Regis, Marc Burns, Jacey Harper, Julian Raeburn	38.97	
6	Nigeria	Taiwo Ajibade, Chinedu Oriala, Sunday Emmanuel, Uchenna Emedolu	39.01	
7	Cameroon	Alfred Moussambani, Serge Bengono, Claude Toukene, Joseph Batangdon	39.52	
8	Wales	Kevin Williams, Douglas Turner, Christian Malcolm, Steven Shalders	39.73	
