= 1999 World Championships in Athletics – Men's 4 × 100 metres relay =

The Men's 4 × 100 metres relay event at the 1999 World Championships in Athletics was held at the Estadio Olímpico de Sevilla on August 28 and August 29.

== Medals ==
Gold:	Silver:	Bronze:
United States; Jon Drummond; Tim Montgomery; Brian Lewis; Maurice Greene	Great Britain; Jason Gardener; Darren Campbell; Marlon Devonish; Dwain Chambers	Brazil; Raphael de Oliveira; Claudinei da Silva; Édson Luciano Ribeiro; André da Silva

== Results ==
=== Heats ===
All times shown are in seconds

AR area record | CR championship record | GR games record | NR national record | OR Olympic record | PB personal best | SB season best | WL world leading (in a given season)
DNS = did not start | DQ = disqualification | NM = no mark (i.e. no valid result) | Q = qualification by place in heat | q = qualification by overall place

==== Heat 1 ====
1. United States (Jon Drummond, Tim Montgomery, Brian Lewis, Maurice Greene) 38.06 Q (WL)
2. Poland (Marcin Krzywański, Marcin Urbaś, Piotr Balcerzak, Marcin Nowak) 38.75 Q (SB)
3. Italy (Luca Verdecchia, Massimiliano Donati, Maurizio Checcucci, Andrea Colombo) 38.98 (SB)
4. Thailand (Kongdech Natenee, Vissanu Sophanich, Reanchai Seerhawong, Sittichai Suwonprateep) 39.55
5. Liberia (Kouty Mawenh, Sayon Cooper, Paul Sehzue, Andrew Reyes) 40.89
- Ghana (Christian Nsiah, Eric Nkansah, Albert Agyemang, Leonard Myles-Mills) DQ
- Canada (Donovan Bailey, Glenroy Gilbert, Trevino Betty, Bruny Surin) DQ
- France (Thierry Lubin, Frédéric Krantz, Vincent Caure, Issa-Aimé Nthépé) DNF

==== Heat 2 ====
1. Great Britain (Jason Gardener, Darren Campbell, Allyn Condon, Dwain Chambers) 38.31 Q
2. Cuba (Alfredo García-Baró, Iván García, Luis Alberto Pérez-Rionda, Yoel Hernández) 38.61 Q (SB)
3. Israel (Rafel Yaar, Gideon Jablonka, Tommy Kafri, Aleksandr Porkhomovskiy) 38.81 (NR)
4. Germany (Marc Blume, Christian Schacht, Holger Blume, Michael Huke) 38.84
5. Cameroon (Jean-Francis Ngapout, Serge Bengono, Joseph Batangdon, Claude Toukene) 39.25 (NR)
  - Australia (Darryl Wohlsen, Paul Di Bella, Dean Capobianco, Matthew Shirvington) DQ
  - Spain (Diego Moisés Santos, José Illán, Francisco Javier Navarro, Carlos Berlanga) DQ

==== Heat 3 ====
1. Brazil (Raphael de Oliveira, Claudinei da Silva, Édson Luciano Ribeiro, André da Silva) 38.46 Q
2. Hungary (Viktor Kovács, Gábor Dobos, Roland Németh, Miklós Gyulai) 38.71 q (SB)
3. South Africa (Morné Nagel, Marcus la Grange, Lee-Roy Newton, Mathew Quinn) 38.76 q (NR)
4. Jamaica (Garth Robinson, Patrick Jarrett, Christopher Williams, Ray Stewart) 38.86
  - Nigeria (Sunday Emmanuel, Francis Obikwelu, Daniel Effiong, Deji Aliu) DQ Q
  - Greece (Georgios Theodoridis, Alexios Alexopoulos, Georgios Panagiotopoulos, Hristoforos Hoidis) DQ
  - Russia (Aleksandr Smirnov, Sergey Slukin, Denis Nikolayev, Andrey Fedoriv) DQ
  - Namibia (Elton Garus-Oab, Benedictus Botha, Christie Van Wyk, Frankie Fredericks) DNS

=== Final ===
1. United States (Jon Drummond, Tim Montgomery, Brian Lewis, Maurice Greene) 37.59 (WL)
2. Great Britain (Jason Gardener, Darren Campbell, Marlon Devonish, Dwain Chambers) 37.73 (AR)
3. Brazil (Raphael de Oliveira, Claudinei da Silva, Édson Luciano Ribeiro, André da Silva) 38.05 (AR)
4. Cuba (Alfredo García-Baró, Iván García, Luis Alberto Pérez-Rionda, Yoel Hernández) 38.63
5. Poland (Marcin Krzywański, Marcin Urbaś, Piotr Balcerzak, Marcin Nowak) 38.70 (SB)
6. South Africa (Morne Nagel, Marcus La Grange, Lee Roy Newton, Mathew Quinn) 38.74 (NR)
7. Hungary (Viktor Kovács, Gábor Dobos, Roland Németh, Zsolt Szeglet) 38.83
  - Nigeria (Innocent Asonze, Francis Obikwelu, Daniel Effiong, Deji Aliu) DQ
