= 2002 European Athletics Championships – Men's 200 metres =

2002 European Men's 200 metres

Men's 200 metres at the 2002 European Athletics Championships
- Venue: Olympic Stadium
- Location: Munich
- Dates: 8 August (heats & quarter-finals); 9 August (semi-finals & final)
- Competitors: 34 from 22 nations
- Winning time: 19.85

Medalists
| gold medal | Konstantinos Kenteris | Greece |
| silver medal | Francis Obikwelu | Portugal |
| bronze medal | Marlon Devonish | Great Britain |

The men's 200 metres at the 2002 European Athletics Championships were held at the Olympic Stadium on August 8–9.

== Results ==
=== Heats ===
Qualification: First 4 of each heat (Q) and the next 4 fastest (q) qualified for the quarterfinals.

==== Heat 1 ====
| Rank | Athlete | Nation | Time | Notes |
|---|---|---|---|---|
| 1 | Marcin Urbaś | Poland | 20.71 | Q |
| 2 | Christian Malcolm | Great Britain | 20.82 | Q |
| 3 | Ronald Pognon | France | 20.84 | Q |
| 4 | Oleg Sergeyev | Russia | 21.06 | Q |
| 5 | Sergejs Inšakovs | Latvia | 21.20 | |
| 6 | Anastasios Goussis | Greece | 21.22 | |
| 7 | Gideon Jablonka | Israel | 21.26 | |
| | | | Wind: +0.8 m/s | |

==== Heat 2 ====
| Rank | Athlete | Nation | Time | Notes |
|---|---|---|---|---|
| 1 | Darren Campbell | Great Britain | 20.66 | Q |
| 2 | Martin Brinarský | Slovakia | 20.75 | Q |
| 3 | Johan Wissman | Sweden | 20.97 | Q |
| 4 | Alessandro Cavallaro | Italy | 21.03 | Q |
| 5 | Steffen Otto | Germany | 21.24 | |
| 6 | Matic Osovnikar | Slovenia | 21.55 | |
| 7 | Dmitriy Chumichkin | Azerbaijan | 21.72 | |
| | | | Wind: -0.2 m/s | |

==== Heat 3 ====
| Rank | Athlete | Nation | Time | Notes |
|---|---|---|---|---|
| 1 | Marlon Devonish | Great Britain | 20.81 | Q |
| 2 | Marco Torrieri | Italy | 20.89 | Q |
| 3 | Sergey Blinov | Russia | 20.99 | Q |
| 4 | Erik Wahn | Sweden | 21.02 | Q |
| 5 | Julian Martínez | Spain | 21.13 | |
| 6 | Paul Brizzel | Ireland | 21.32 | |
| | | | Wind: +0.1 m/s | |

==== Heat 4 ====
| Rank | Athlete | Nation | Time | Notes |
|---|---|---|---|---|
| 1 | Francis Obikwelu | Portugal | 20.55 | Q |
| 2 | Marcin Jędrusiński | Poland | 20.57 | Q |
| 3 | Geir Moen | Norway | 20.68 | Q |
| 4 | Tommi Hartonen | Finland | 20.87 | Q |
| 5 | Jiří Vojtík | Czech Republic | 20.88 | q |
| 6 | Gary Ryan | Ireland | 20.93 | q |
| 7 | Christian Birk | Denmark | 21.15 | |
| | | | Wind: +0.8 m/s | |

==== Heat 5 ====
| Rank | Athlete | Nation | Time | Notes |
|---|---|---|---|---|
| 1 | Konstantinos Kenteris | Greece | 20.55 | Q |
| 2 | Troy Douglas | Netherlands | 20.81 | Q |
| 3 | Johan Engberg | Sweden | 20.83 | Q |
| 4 | Anninos Marcoullides | Cyprus | 20.87 | Q |
| 5 | John Ertzgaard | Norway | 20.88 | q |
| 6 | Emanuele Di Gregorio | Italy | 21.04 | q |
| 7 | Paul Hession | Ireland | 21.28 | |
| | | | Wind: +0.1 m/s | |

=== Quarter-finals ===
Qualification: First 4 of each heat (Q) and the next 4 fastest (q) qualified for the semifinals.

==== Heat 1 ====
| Rank | Athlete | Nation | Time | Notes |
|---|---|---|---|---|
| 1 | Marcin Urbaś | Poland | 20.86 | Q |
| 2 | Marco Torrieri | Italy | 20.90 | Q |
| 3 | Anninos Marcoullides | Cyprus | 21.04 | Q |
| 4 | John Ertzgaard | Norway | 21.14 | Q |
| 5 | Jiří Vojtík | Czech Republic | 21.16 | |
| 6 | Johan Engberg | Sweden | 21.21 | |
| 7 | Sergey Blinov | Russia | 21.32 | |
| – | Darren Campbell | Great Britain | DQ | |
| | | | Wind: -1.8 m/s | |

==== Heat 2 ====
| Rank | Athlete | Nation | Time | Notes |
|---|---|---|---|---|
| 1 | Konstantinos Kenteris | Greece | 20.29 | Q |
| 2 | Marlon Devonish | Great Britain | 20.41 | Q |
| 3 | Troy Douglas | Netherlands | 20.78 | Q |
| 4 | Geir Moen | Norway | 20.85 | Q |
| 5 | Tommi Hartonen | Finland | 20.90 | q |
| 6 | Oleg Sergeyev | Russia | 21.11 | |
| 7 | Emanuele Di Gregorio | Italy | 21.17 | |
| – | Johan Wissman | Sweden | DNF | |
| | | | Wind: -0.8 m/s | |

==== Heat 3 ====
| Rank | Athlete | Nation | Time | Notes |
|---|---|---|---|---|
| 1 | Marcin Jędrusiński | Poland | 20.37 | Q |
| 2 | Francis Obikwelu | Portugal | 20.60 | Q |
| 3 | Christian Malcolm | Great Britain | 20.66 | Q |
| 4 | Martin Brinarský | Slovakia | 20.83 | Q |
| 5 | Gary Ryan | Ireland | 20.98 | q |
| 6 | Ronald Pognon | France | 20.99 | q |
| 7 | Alessandro Cavallaro | Italy | 21.01 | q |
| 8 | Erik Wahn | Sweden | 21.06 | |
| | | | Wind: -0.3 m/s | |

=== Semi-finals ===
Qualification: First 4 of each semifinal (Q) qualified directly for the final.

==== Heat 1 ====
| Rank | Athlete | Nation | Time | Notes |
|---|---|---|---|---|
| 1 | Marcin Jędrusiński | Poland | 20.46 | Q |
| 2 | Francis Obikwelu | Portugal | 20.48 | Q |
| 3 | Christian Malcolm | Great Britain | 20.54 | Q |
| 4 | Marco Torrieri | Italy | 20.78 | Q |
| 5 | Martin Brinarský | Slovakia | 20.97 | |
| 6 | Gary Ryan | Ireland | 20.98 | |
| 7 | Ronald Pognon | France | 21.04 | |
| 8 | Geir Moen | Norway | 21.21 | |
| | | | Wind: -0.5 m/s | |

==== Heat 2 ====
| Rank | Athlete | Nation | Time | Notes |
|---|---|---|---|---|
| 1 | Konstantinos Kenteris | Greece | 20.18 | Q, =EL |
| 2 | Marlon Devonish | Great Britain | 20.23 | Q |
| 3 | Marcin Urbaś | Poland | 20.60 | Q |
| 4 | Troy Douglas | Netherlands | 20.64 | Q |
| 5 | Anninos Marcoullides | Cyprus | 20.69 | |
| 6 | Alessandro Cavallaro | Italy | 21.01 | |
| 7 | Tommi Hartonen | Finland | 21.04 | |
| – | John Ertzgaard | Norway | DNF | |
| | | | Wind: +0.2 m/s | |

=== Final ===
| Rank | Athlete | Nation | Time | Notes |
|---|---|---|---|---|
| 1st place, gold medalist(s) | Konstantinos Kenteris | Greece | 19.85 | CR, NR |
| 2nd place, silver medalist(s) | Francis Obikwelu | Portugal | 20.21 | NR |
| 3rd place, bronze medalist(s) | Marlon Devonish | Great Britain | 20.24 | |
| 4 | Christian Malcolm | Great Britain | 20.30 | SB |
| 5 | Marcin Jędrusiński | Poland | 20.31 | PB |
| 6 | Marco Torrieri | Italy | 20.68 | |
| 7 | Troy Douglas | Netherlands | 20.73 | |
| – | Marcin Urbaś | Poland | DNF | |
| | | | Wind: -0.5 m/s | |
