= Athletics at the 1999 Summer Universiade – Men's 4 × 100 metres relay =

The men's 4 × 100 metres relay event at the 1999 Summer Universiade was held at the Estadio Son Moix in Palma de Mallorca, Spain on 12 and 13 July.

== Results ==
=== Heats ===
Rank	Heat	Nation	Athletes	Time	Notes
1	1	United States	Kaaron Conwright, Terrence Trammell, Coby Miller, John Capel	38.90	Q
2	3	Brazil	Raphael de Oliveira, Édson Ribeiro, Cláudio Roberto Souza, André Domingos	39.06	Q
3	2	Japan	Yasukatsu Otsuki, Akihiro Yasui, Hirofumi Nakagawa, Hiroshi Nagashima	39.13	Q
4	2	South Africa	Morné Nagel, Bradley Agnew, Lee-Roy Newton, Mathew Quinn	39.21	Q
5	3	Italy	Luca Verdecchia, Alessandro Orlandi, Alessandro Attene, Andrea Colombo	39.25	Q
6	1	Poland	Ryszard Pilarczyk, Marcin Urbaś, Piotr Balcerzak, Marcin Nowak	39.29	Q
7	2	Jamaica	Christopher Williams, Patrick Jarret, Paston Coke, Raoul Harvey	39.29	q
8	2	Hungary	Viktor Kovács, László Babály, Roland Németh, Gábor Dobos	39.31	q
9	1	Greece	Panagiotis Sarris, Kostas Bogiatsiakis, Christos Magos, Vasilios Segos	39.50	
10	3	Russia	Valeriy Kirdyashov, Aleksandr Ryabov, Denis Nikolayev, Sergey Slukin	39.53	
11	2	Spain	Frutos Feo, Carlos Berlanga, Ángel Antonio García, José Illán	39.68	
12	3	Chile	Fabián Aguilera, Raimundo Silva, Ricardo Roach, Juan Pablo Faúndez	40.03	
13	3	Malaysia	S.mohd Izuan, Kamarudizaman Abu Bakar, Lim Tan Kok, Nazmizan Muhammad	40.18	
14	2	Netherlands	Timothy Beck, Christoph Kempen, Rowdy Middelkoop, Hans Vehof	40.22	
15	3	Great Britain	Daniel Money, John Stewart, Graham Beasley, Christopher Davidson	40.39	
16	3	Nigeria	Olatunji Olayemi, Joseph Eigriremgmlem, Ambrose Ezenwa, C. Isaac	40.45	
17	1	Hong Kong	Chan Chi Hong, Leung Chun Kit, Chan Ming Sang, Ho Kwan Lung	41.90	
18	1	Macau	Lei Ka In, Lei Pak Lim, Leong Kin Kuan, Chau Way Choi	43.22	
	1	Ivory Coast		DNS	
	2	Uganda		DNS	
	3	Slovenia		DNS	

=== Final ===
Rank	Nation	Athletes	Time	Notes
1st place, gold medalist(s)	United States	Kaaron Conwright, Terrence Trammell, Coby Miller, John Capel	38.55	
2nd place, silver medalist(s)	South Africa	Morné Nagel, Bradley Agnew, Lee-Roy Newton, Mathew Quinn	39.08	
3rd place, bronze medalist(s)	Italy	Luca Verdecchia, Alessandro Orlandi, Alessandro Attene, Andrea Colombo	39.31	
4	Jamaica	Christopher Williams, Patrick Jarret, Paston Coke, Raoul Harvey	39.36	
5	Japan	Yasukatsu Otsuki, Akihiro Yasui, Hirofumi Nakagawa, Hiroshi Nagashima	39.37	
6	Hungary	Viktor Kovács, László Babály, Roland Németh, Gábor Dobos	39.44	
7	Poland	Ryszard Pilarczyk, Marcin Urbaś, Piotr Balcerzak, Marcin Nowak	39.46	
	Brazil	Raphael de Oliveira, Édson Ribeiro, Cláudio Roberto Souza, André Domingos	DNF	
