= 2005 European Athletics Indoor Championships – Men's 200 metres =

The Men's 200 metres event at the 2005 European Athletics Indoor Championships was held on March 5–6. This was the last time the 200 metres were contested at European Indoor Championships.

== Medalists ==
| Gold | Silver | Bronze |
|---|---|---|
| Tobias Unger; Germany | Chris Lambert; Great Britain | Marcin Urbaś; Poland |

== Results ==
=== Heats ===
The winner of each heat (Q) and the next 9 fastest (q) qualified for the semifinals.

| Rank | Heat | Name | Nationality | Time | Notes |
|---|---|---|---|---|---|
| 1 | 4 | Chris Lambert | Great Britain | 20.77 | Q, PB |
| 2 | 4 | Paul Hession | Ireland | 20.80 | q, PB |
| 3 | 3 | Guus Hoogmoed | Netherlands | 20.81 | Q, PB |
| 4 | 1 | Marcin Urbaś | Poland | 20.87 | Q, =SB |
| 5 | 5 | Tim Abeyie | Great Britain | 20.92 | Q, PB |
| 6 | 1 | Johan Wissman | Sweden | 20.93 | q, SB |
| 6 | 5 | Jiří Vojtík | Czech Republic | 20.93 | q, PB |
| 8 | 2 | Tobias Unger | Germany | 20.95 | Q |
| 9 | 2 | Marcin Jędrusiński | Poland | 20.97 | q, SB |
| 10 | 6 | Dmytro Hlushchenko | Ukraine | 20.98 | q, SB |
| 11 | 3 | Alexander Kosenkow | Germany | 21.02 | q |
| 12 | 6 | Massimiliano Donati | Italy | 21.05 | q, SB |
| 13 | 2 | Idrissa M'Barke | France | 21.07 | q, =PB |
| 14 | 5 | Matic Osovnikar | Slovenia | 21.09 | q, SB |
| 15 | 4 | Panayiotis Sarris | Greece | 21.10 | q, SB |
| 16 | 3 | Tommi Hartonen | Finland | 21.13 | NR |
| 17 | 1 | Paul Brizzel | Ireland | 21.27 | |
| 18 | 1 | Nipa Tran | Finland | 21.61 | PB |
| 19 | 3 | Josip Šoprek | Croatia | 21.65 | |
| 20 | 4 | Marko Janković | Serbia and Montenegro | 21.76 | |
| | 5 | Santiago Ezquerro | Spain | DQ | |
| | 6 | Sebastian Ernst | Germany | DQ | |

=== Semifinals ===
First, 2 of each heat (Q) qualified directly for the final.

| Rank | Heat | Name | Nationality | Time | Notes |
|---|---|---|---|---|---|
| 1 | 2 | Tobias Unger | Germany | 20.64 | Q |
| 2 | 3 | Chris Lambert | Great Britain | 20.74 | Q, PB |
| 3 | 2 | Guus Hoogmoed | Netherlands | 20.86 | Q |
| 4 | 1 | Marcin Urbaś | Poland | 20.88 | Q |
| 5 | 3 | Dmytro Hlushchenko | Ukraine | 20.89 | Q, PB |
| 6 | 1 | Tim Abeyie | Great Britain | 20.93 | Q |
| 7 | 1 | Alexander Kosenkow | Germany | 20.96 | PB |
| 8 | 3 | Paul Hession | Ireland | 21.03 | |
| 9 | 1 | Jiří Vojtík | Czech Republic | 21.11 | |
| 9 | 3 | Massimiliano Donati | Italy | 21.11 | |
| 11 | 2 | Marcin Jędrusiński | Poland | 21.19 | |
| 12 | 2 | Johan Wissman | Sweden | 21.27 | |
| 13 | 1 | Panayiotis Sarris | Greece | 21.53 | |
| 14 | 3 | Idrissa M'Barke | France | 21.63 | |
| | 2 | Matic Osovnikar | Slovenia | DNS | |

=== Final ===
| Rank | Lane | Name | Nationality | Time | React | Notes |
|---|---|---|---|---|---|---|
| 1st place, gold medalist(s) | 6 | Tobias Unger | Germany | 20.53 | 0.262 | NR |
| 2nd place, silver medalist(s) | 5 | Chris Lambert | Great Britain | 20.69 | 0.196 | PB |
| 3rd place, bronze medalist(s) | 3 | Marcin Urbaś | Poland | 21.04 | 0.157 | |
| 4 | 4 | Guus Hoogmoed | Netherlands | 21.12 | 0.175 | |
| 5 | 2 | Dmytro Hlushchenko | Ukraine | 21.25 | 0.175 | |
| | 1 | Tim Abeyie | Great Britain | DNS | | |
