= Athletics at the 2002 Commonwealth Games – Men's 200 metres =

Men's 200 metres at the 2002 Commonwealth Games
- Venue: City of Manchester Stadium
- Dates: 28 July 2002 (heats); 28 July 2002 (quarter finals); 29 July 2002 (semi finals); 29 July 2002 (final)
- Competitors: 49 from 31 nations
- Winning time: 20.06

Medalists
gold medal	Frankie Fredericks	Namibia
silver medal	Marlon Devonish	England
bronze medal	Darren Campbell	England

The men's 200 metres event at the 2002 Commonwealth Games took place on 28 and 29 July at the City of Manchester Stadium in Manchester, England. Frankie Fredericks of Namibia won the gold in 20.06 seconds eight years after he won the same event in Victoria. Marlon Devonish at his home Games finished in second, taking the silver medal in a personal best time of 20.19. His compatriot and Olympic silver medallist Darren Campbell won the bronze with a photo required to separate him from Dominic Demeritte of the Bahamas with both crossing the line in 20.21 seconds. This was a season's best for Campbell and a national record for Demeritte.

This was the ninth running of the 200 metres event at the Commonwealth Games after converting to metric at the 1970 Edinburgh Games. A 220-yard event was contested between 1930 and 1966. 49 competitors from 31 nations entered the event. Kim Collins, world bronze medallist and who achieved Saint Kitts and Nevis' first ever Commonwealth medal after winning the 100 metre event earlier in the meet, decided to withdraw from the 200. Whilst the 100 metre silver medallist Nigeria's Uchenna Emedolu was disqualified in the quarter finals.

The defending champion from Kuala Lumpur, Julian Golding was unable to compete in the English selection trials as he was not fully fit following injury. The silver medallist from four years ago, Wales' Christian Malcolm managed to reach the final again and placed 8th.

== Records ==
Prior to this competition, the existing records were as follows:

Records before the 2002 Commonwealth Games
Record	Time (s)	Athlete (nation)	Meet	Location	Date	Ref
World record	19.32	Michael Johnson (USA)	Olympics	Atlanta, United States	1 August 1996	
Commonwealth record	19.68	Frankie Fredericks (NAM)	Olympics	Atlanta, United States	1 August 1996	
Games record	19.97	Frankie Fredericks (NAM)	Commonwealth Games	Victoria, Canada	26 August 1994	

== Results ==
=== Heats ===
The heats were held on 28 July, starting at 11:55 in the morning.

Qualification Rules: First 4 in each heat (Q) and the best 4 of remaining athletes (q) advance to the quarter finals.

==== Heat 1 ====
Results of heat 1
Rank	Athlete	Nation	Time	Notes
1	Marlon Devonish	England	20.61	Q
2	Christian Malcolm	Wales	21.01	Q
3	Tawanda Chiwira	Zimbabwe	21.12	Q
4	Uchenna Emedolu	Nigeria	21.49	Q
5	Sherwin James	Dominica	21.73	q
6	David Lightbourne	Turks and Caicos Islands	23.03	
	Claude Toukéné-Guébogo	Cameroon	DNF	
			Wind: +0.5 m/s	

==== Heat 2 ====
Results of heat 2
Rank	Athlete	Nation	Time	Notes
1	Chris Lambert	England	20.77	Q
2	Jermaine Joseph	Canada	21.11	Q
3	Jaysuma Saidy Ndure	The Gambia	21.25	Q, NR
4	Jamie Henthorn	Wales	21.35	Q
5	Kurvin Wallace	Saint Kitts and Nevis	22.00	q
6	Alhagie Faye	The Gambia	22.11	
7	Reonardo Harvey	Turks and Caicos Islands	22.46	
			Wind: +1.3 m/s	

==== Heat 3 ====
Results of heat 3
Rank	Athlete	Nation	Time	Notes
1	Joseph Batangdon	Cameroon	20.61	Q
2	Aziz Zakari	Ghana	20.65	Q
3	Ricardo Williams	Jamaica	20.81	Q
4	Anninos Marcoullides	Cyprus	20.95	Q, SB
5	Xavier James	Bermuda	21.04	q, PB
6	Dion Crabbe	British Virgin Islands	21.27	q
7	Robert Nidithawae	Vanuatu	23.13	
			Wind: 0.0 m/s	

==== Heat 4 ====
Results of heat 4
Rank	Athlete	Nation	Time	Notes
1	Stéphan Buckland	Mauritius	20.91	Q
2	Marvin Regis	Trinidad and Tobago	21.07	Q
3	Jamial Rolle	Bahamas	21.60	Q
4	Yusupha Bojang	The Gambia	21.75	Q
	Kim Collins	Saint Kitts and Nevis	DNS	
	Dwenney Musgrove	Turks and Caicos Islands	DNS	
	Deji Aliu	Nigeria	DNS	
			Wind: +0.3 m/s	

==== Heat 5 ====
Results of heat 5
Rank	Athlete	Nation	Time	Notes
1	Darren Campbell	England	20.87	Q
2	Morné Nagel	South Africa	21.16	Q
3	Douglas Turner	Wales	21.18	Q
4	Sudath Weerasinghe	Sri Lanka	21.93	Q
5	Jeffrey Bai	Papua New Guinea	22.23	
6	Afele Leona	Niue	22.91	
	Gabrieli Waaivanua	Fiji	DNS	
			Wind: +0.7 m/s	

==== Heat 6 ====
Results of heat 6
Rank	Athlete	Nation	Time	Notes
1	Frankie Fredericks	Namibia	20.85	Q
2	Dallas Roberts	New Zealand	20.96	Q
3	Philip Mukomana	Zimbabwe	21.39	Q
4	Peter Pulu	Papua New Guinea	21.85	Q
5	Billi Paea	Niue	24.11	
	Reuben Apuri	Solomon Islands	DNS	
	Md Safiqul Islam	Bangladesh	DNS	
			Wind: +0.3 m/s	

==== Heat 7 ====
Results of heat 7
Rank	Athlete	Nation	Time	Notes
1	Dominic Demeritte	Bahamas	20.91	Q
2	Prasanna Amarasekara	Sri Lanka	21.17	Q
3	Brian Dzingai	Zimbabwe	21.52	Q
4	Ali Yasir Rai	Pakistan	22.27	Q
	Christopher Williams	Jamaica	DQ	
	Harmon Harmon	Cook Islands	DNS	
	Paul McKee	Northern Ireland	DNS	
			Wind: +0.3 m/s	

=== Quarter finals ===
The quarter finals were held on 28 July, starting at 19:48 in the evening.

Qualification: First 4 of each heat qualified directly (Q) for the semi finals.

==== Quarter final 1 ====
Results of quarter final 1
Rank	Athlete	Nation	Time	Notes
1	Dominic Demeritte	Bahamas	20.49	Q
2	Joseph Batangdon	Cameroon	20.60	Q
3	Christian Malcolm	Wales	20.61	Q
4	Ricardo Williams	Jamaica	20.73	Q
5	Jaysuma Saidy Ndure	The Gambia	21.20	NR
6	Sherwin James	Dominica	21.89	
7	Sudath Weerasinghe	Sri Lanka	21.97	
	Uchenna Emedolu	Nigeria	DQ	
			Wind: +0.8 m/s	

==== Quarter final 2 ====
Results of quarter final 2
Rank	Athlete	Nation	Time	Notes
1	Frankie Fredericks	Namibia	20.58	Q
2	Darren Campbell	England	20.70	Q, SB
3	Jermaine Joseph	Canada	20.99	Q
4	Morné Nagel	South Africa	21.02	Q
5	Brian Dzingai	Zimbabwe	21.31	
6	Jamial Rolle	Bahamas	21.50	
7	Xavier James	Bermuda	21.50	
	Ali Yasir Rai	Pakistan	DNS	
			Wind: +0.5 m/s	

==== Quarter final 3 ====
Results of quarter final 3
Rank	Athlete	Nation	Time	Notes
1	Stéphan Buckland	Mauritius	20.77	Q
2	Chris Lambert	England	20.90	Q
3	Anninos Marcoullides	Cyprus	21.14	Q
4	Marvin Regis	Trinidad and Tobago	21.17	Q
5	Prasanna Amarasekara	Sri Lanka	21.28	
6	Jamie Henthorn	Wales	21.58	
7	Philip Mukomana	Zimbabwe	21.71	
	Dion Crabbe	British Virgin Islands	DNS	
			Wind: +1.3 m/s	

==== Quarter final 4 ====
Results of quarter final 4
Rank	Athlete	Nation	Time	Notes
1	Marlon Devonish	England	20.63	Q
2	Aziz Zakari	Ghana	20.73	Q
3	Dallas Roberts	New Zealand	21.24	Q
4	Douglas Turner	Wales	21.24	Q
5	Tawanda Chiwira	Zimbabwe	21.29	
6	Peter Pulu	Papua New Guinea	22.10	
7	Kurvin Wallace	Saint Kitts and Nevis	22.15	
8	Yusupha Bojang	The Gambia	22.68	
			Wind: -0.40 m/s	

=== Semi finals ===
The semi finals were held on 29 July, starting at 18:47 in the evening.

Qualification: First 4 of each heat qualified directly (Q) for the final.

==== Semi final 1 ====
Results of semi final 1
Rank	Athlete	Nation	Time	Notes
1	Frankie Fredericks	Namibia	20.34	Q
2	Marlon Devonish	England	20.55	Q
3	Aziz Zakari	Ghana	20.57	Q
4	Darren Campbell	England	20.58	Q, SB
5	Marvin Regis	Trinidad and Tobago	21.06	
6	Jermaine Joseph	Canada	21.09	
7	Douglas Turner	Wales	21.11	
8	Anninos Marcoullides	Cyprus	21.16	
			Wind: +0.40 m/s	

==== Semi final 2 ====
Results of semi final 2
Rank	Athlete	Nation	Time	Notes
1	Dominic Demeritte	Bahamas	20.43	Q
2	Joseph Batangdon	Cameroon	20.55	Q
3	Christian Malcolm	Wales	20.55	Q, SB
4	Morné Nagel	South Africa	20.57	Q
5	Stéphan Buckland	Mauritius	20.61	
6	Chris Lambert	England	21.02	
7	Ricardo Williams	Jamaica	21.13	
8	Dallas Roberts	New Zealand	21.17	
			Wind: +0.40 m/s	

=== Final ===
The final was held at 20:14 on 29 July.

Results of the final
Rank	Athlete	Nation	Time	Notes
1st place, gold medalist(s)	Frankie Fredericks	Namibia	20.06	
2nd place, silver medalist(s)	Marlon Devonish	England	20.19	PB
3rd place, bronze medalist(s)	Darren Campbell	England	20.21	SB
4	Dominic Demeritte	Bahamas	20.21	NR
5	Aziz Zakari	Ghana	20.29	SB
6	Morné Nagel	South Africa	20.35	
7	Joseph Batangdon	Cameroon	20.36	SB
8	Christian Malcolm	Wales	20.39	SB
			Wind: +1.4 m/s	
