= 2001 World Championships in Athletics – Men's 200 metres =

Men's 200 metres at the 2001 World Championships
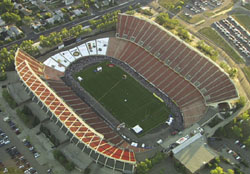
- Venue: Commonwealth Stadium
- Dates: 7 August (heats and quarter-finals); 8 August (semi-finals); 9 August (final)
- Competitors: 52
- Winning time: 20.04

Medalists
gold medal	Konstantinos Kenteris	Greece
silver medal	Christopher Williams	Jamaica
bronze medal	Kim Collins	Saint Kitts and Nevis

These are the official results of the Men's 200 metres event at the 2001 IAAF World Championships in Edmonton, Canada. There were a total number of 52 participating athletes, with seven qualifying heats, four quarter-finals, two semi-finals and the final held on Thursday 9 August 2001 at 21:40h. The finals were one of the closest events in the history of the World Athletics Championship. As, all the medal winners except for gold were given the same time. The winning margin was 0.16 seconds.

== Medalists ==
Gold	Konstantinos Kenteris; Greece (GRE)
Silver	Christopher Williams; Jamaica (JAM)
Bronze	Kim Collins; Saint Kitts and Nevis (SKN)

== Records ==
Standing records prior to the 2001 World Athletics Championships
World Record	Michael Johnson (USA)	19.32	August 1, 1996	Atlanta, United States
Championship Record	Michael Johnson (USA)	19.79	August 11, 1995	Gothenburg, Sweden
Season Best	Ramon Clay (USA)	20.05	July 4, 2001	Lausanne, Switzerland

== Final ==
RANK	FINAL	TIME
	Konstantinos Kenteris (GRE)	20.04
	Christopher Williams (JAM)	20.20
	Kim Collins (SKN)	20.20
	Shawn Crawford (USA)	20.20
5.	Christian Malcolm (GBR)	20.22
6.	Stéphane Buckland (MRI)	20.24
7.	Kevin Little (USA)	20.25
8.	Marlon Devonish (GBR)	20.38

== Semi-final ==
- Held on Wednesday 8 August 2001

RANK	HEAT 1	TIME
1.	Christian Malcolm (GBR)	20.08
2.	Kevin Little (USA)	20.13
3.	Stéphane Buckland (MRI)	20.15
4.	Kim Collins (SKN)	20.26
5.	Marcin Urbaś (POL)	20.48
6.	Toshiyuki Fujimoto (JPN)	20.56
7.	Tommi Hartonen (FIN)	20.65
8.	Joseph Batangdon (CMR)	20.66

RANK	HEAT 2	TIME
1.	Konstantinos Kenteris (GRE)	20.03
2.	Christopher Williams (JAM)	20.11
3.	Shawn Crawford (USA)	20.21
4.	Marlon Devonish (GBR)	20.29
5.	Marco Torrieri (ITA)	20.38
6.	Shingo Suetsugu (JPN)	20.39
7.	Uchenna Emedolu (NGR)	20.40
8.	Claudinei da Silva (BRA)	20.64

== Quarter-finals ==
- Held on Tuesday 7 August 2001

RANK	HEAT 1	TIME
1.	Christian Malcolm (GBR)	20.13
2.	Shawn Crawford (USA)	20.19
3.	Stéphane Buckland (MRI)	20.23
4.	Joseph Batangdon (CMR)	20.31 =NR
5.	Oumar Loum (SEN)	20.43
6.	Gennadiy Chernovol (KAZ)	20.71
7.	Frédéric Krantz (FRA)	21.02
—	Ryo Matsuda (JPN)	DQ

RANK	HEAT 2	TIME
1.	Konstantinos Kenteris (GRE)	20.30
2.	Marco Torrieri (ITA)	20.43
3.	Marlon Devonish (GBR)	20.44
4.	Shingo Suetsugu (JPN)	20.48
5.	Troy Douglas (NED)	20.54
6.	Ricardo Williams (JAM)	20.65
7.	Heber Viera (URU)	20.83
8.	Dominic Demeritte (BAH)	20.86

RANK	HEAT 3	TIME
1.	Christopher Williams (JAM)	20.24
2.	Kim Collins (SKN)	20.25
3.	Uchenna Emedolu (NGR)	20.48
4.	Toshiyuki Fujimoto (JPN)	20.78
5.	Juan Pedro Toledo (MEX)	20.80
6.	Marcus La Grange (RSA)	20.83
7.	Caimin Douglas (AHO)	20.87
8.	Ramon Clay (USA)	23.58

RANK	HEAT 4	TIME
1.	Kevin Little (USA)	20.34
2.	Marcin Urbaś (POL)	20.54
3.	Tommi Hartonen (FIN)	20.58
4.	Claudinei da Silva (BRA)	20.58
5.	Dwain Chambers (GBR)	20.60
6.	Alexander Kosenkow (GER)	20.66
7.	John Ertzgard (NOR)	20.88
—	Christophe Cheval (FRA)	DQ

== Heats ==
Held on Tuesday 7 August 2001

RANK	HEAT 1	TIME
1.	Shingo Suetsugu (JPN)	20.53
2.	Stéphane Buckland (MRI)	20.61
3.	Gennadiy Chernovol (KAZ)	20.65
4.	Claudinei da Silva (BRA)	20.78
5.	Ricardo Williams (JAM)	20.85
6.	Christie van Wyk (NAM)	21.25
7.	Rika Fardani (INA)	21.87
8.	Jayson Jones (BIZ)	22.13

RANK	HEAT 2	TIME
1.	Marco Torrieri (ITA)	20.63
2.	Heber Viera (URU)	20.69
3.	Dwain Chambers (GBR)	20.80
4.	André da Silva (BRA)	21.00
5.	Jermaine Joseph (CAN)	21.17
6.	Conrad Rdechor (PLW)	22.86
—	Christophe Cheval (FRA)	DQ
—	Mourade Mze Ali (COM)	DNS

RANK	HEAT 3	TIME
1.	Konstantinos Kenteris (GRE)	20.46
2.	Marlon Devonish (GBR)	20.58
3.	Caimin Douglas (AHO)	20.63
4.	Marcus La Grange (RSA)	20.69
5.	Radek Zachoval (CZE)	21.03
6.	Chang Po-Chih (TPE)	21.63
—	Keita Cline (IVB)	DQ

RANK	HEAT 4	TIME
1.	Shawn Crawford (USA)	20.60
2.	Joseph Batangdon (CMR)	20.63
3.	Alexander Kosenkow (GER)	20.63
4.	Toshiyuki Fujimoto (JPN)	20.77
5.	Corne Du Plessis (RSA)	20.92
6.	Salem Mubarak Al-Yami (KSA)	21.03
7.	Darren Tuitt (MSR)	21.94

RANK	HEAT 5	TIME
1.	Christian Malcolm (GBR)	20.37
2.	Ramon Clay (USA)	20.43
3.	Troy Douglas (NED)	20.65
4.	John Ertzgard (NOR)	20.68
5.	Dominic Demeritte (BAH)	20.75
6.	Juan Pedro Toledo (MEX)	20.83
—	Frank Fredericks (NAM)	DNS

RANK	HEAT 6	TIME
1.	Kevin Little (USA)	20.36
2.	Tommi Hartonen (FIN)	20.57
3.	Uchenna Emedolu (NGR)	20.58
4.	Frédéric Krantz (FRA)	20.84
5.	Erik Wijmeersch (BEL)	21.17
6.	Tobias Unger (GER)	21.30
7.	Lei Wai-Kun (MAC)	21.63

RANK	HEAT 7	TIME
1.	Christopher Williams (JAM)	20.25
2.	Kim Collins (SKN)	20.41
3.	Marcin Urbaś (POL)	20.41
4.	Oumar Loum (SEN)	20.51
5.	Ryo Matsuda (JPN)	20.79
6.	Eric Pacome N'Dri (CIV)	20.87
7.	Patrick van Balkom (NED)	20.96
8.	Hamoud Abdallah Al-Dalhami (OMN)	21.45
