= Konstantinos Kenteris =

Greek athlete (born 1973)

Kostas Kenteris
Personal information
- Full name: Konstantinos Kenteris
- Nickname: Ο Γιος του Ανέμου (The Son of the Wind)
- Nationality: Greece
- Born: 11 July 1973 (age 53) Mytilene, Greece
- Height: 1.80 m (5 ft 11 in)
- Weight: 73 kg (161 lb)

Sport
- Sport: 100 metres, 200 metres, 400 metres, 4 × 100 metres relay, 4 × 400 metres relay
- College team: Arion Mytilene
- Club: Olympiakos CFP

Achievements and titles
- Personal bests: 100 m: 10.15; 200 m: 19.85 CR, EL, NR, SB; 400 m: 45.60
Medal record
Men's Athletics
Representing Greece
Olympic Games
Gold medal – first place	2000 Sydney	200 m
World Championships
Gold medal – first place	2001 Edmonton	200 m
European Championships
Gold medal – first place	2002 Munich	200 m
European Cup
Gold medal – first place	2001 Bremen	200 m
Gold medal – first place	2003 Florence	200 m
Silver medal – second place	2000 Gateshead	4 × 100 m relay
Silver medal – second place	2001 Bremen	100 m
Silver medal – second place	2003 Florence	4 × 400 m relay
Bronze medal – third place	1999 Paris	400 m
Bronze medal – third place	2000 Gateshead	200 m
Athens Grand Prix Tsiklitiria
Gold medal – first place	2001 Athens	200 m
Gold medal – first place	2003 Athens	200 m
Gold medal – first place	2004 Athens	200 m
Mediterranean Games
Gold medal – first place	1993 Narbonne	400 m
Greek Athletics Championships
Representing Arion Mytilene
Gold medal – first place	1991 Athens	400 m
Gold medal – first place	1992 Athens	400 m
Gold medal – first place	1993 Athens	400 m
Representing Olympiacos CFP
Gold medal – first place	1997 Athens	4 × 100 m relay
Gold medal – first place	1998 Athens	400 m
Gold medal – first place	1998 Athens	4 × 400 m relay
Gold medal – first place	1999 Athens	200 m
Gold medal – first place	1999 Athens	400 m
Gold medal – first place	2000 Athens	4 × 100 m relay
Gold medal – first place	2001 Athens	100 m
Gold medal – first place	2002 Trikala	200 m
Gold medal – first place	2002 Trikala	4 × 400 m relay
Gold medal – first place	2004 Athens	100 m
Gold medal – first place	2004 Athens	4 × 100 m relay
Greek Indoor Athletics Championships
Representing Arion Mytilene
Gold medal – first place	1993 Piraeus	200 m
Gold medal – first place	1993 Piraeus	400 m
Gold medal – first place	1994 Piraeus	200 m
Gold medal – first place	1994 Piraeus	400 m
Gold medal – first place	1996 Piraeus	400 m

Konstantinos "Kostas" Kenteris, also spelled as Konstadinos "Costas" Kederis (Greek: Κωνσταντίνος "Κώστας" Κεντέρης pronounced [konsta'dinos ce'deris]; born July 11, 1973) is a Greek former athlete. He won gold medals in the 200 metres at the 2000 Summer Olympics, the 2001 World Championships in Athletics and the 2002 European Championships in Athletics, making him the only European sprinter (along with Linford Christie) to win the gold medal in all three major competitions and the only European World Champion in the 200 metres races. Additionally, he has won two gold, three silver and two bronze medals in the European Cup, as well as three gold medals in the 200 metres at the Athens Grand Prix Tsiklitiria. He is also a 14-time golden medalist at the Greek Athletics Championships and a five-time golden medalist at the Greek Indoor Athletics Championships. He withdrew from the 2004 Summer Olympics, held in his home country, after a doping violation (failed to attend drug test).

Kenteris was named the Greek Male Athlete of the Year three times, for the years 2000, 2001, and 2002. He was also named the Best Balkan Athlete of the Year two times, for the years 2000 and 2001.

== Career ==
Born in Mytilene, Kenteris, a student of physical education, started practising athletics at age 10, and started running seriously about ten years later, when he moved to Thessaloniki.

Kenteris specialised in the 200 m and 400 m. His first national titles were the three consecutive 400 m gold medals at the Greek Athletics Championships (1991 (46.90), 1992 (46.85), 1993 (46.27)) in Athens with 200 m (21.57) and 400 m (47.76) gold medals at the 1993 Greek Indoor Athletics Championships in Piraeus, representing his home town team, Arion Mytilene. He also competed at the 1992 World Junior Championships in Seoul where he finished 6th in 200 m (21.10). His first major international title was the gold medal in 400 m (45.70) at the 1993 Mediterranean Games in Narbonne. At the 1994 Greek Indoor Athletics Championships in Piraeus, he defended his 200 m (20.93) and 400 m (46.73) gold medals. He repeated his success in the 400 m (47.11) by winning gold at the 1996 Greek Indoor Athletics Championships. In 1997, Kenteris moved to Athens and Olympiacos CFP, with whom he won the 4 × 100 m relay gold (40.86) at the 1997 Greek Athletics Championships in Athens. Kenteris repeated his success the following year when he won the 400 m (45.87) and 4 × 400 m relay (3:11.95) gold medals at the 1998 Greek Athletics Championships in Athens.

It was not until 1998 that Kenteris took part in his first major international tournaments, when he took 9th place (semi finals) in both 400 m (45.74) and 4 × 400 m relay (3:06.48) at the 1998 European Championships in Budapest. He also took the 7th place at the 1998 IAAF World Cup in Johannesburg, in the 4 × 400 m relay race (3:03.95), representing the European team. In 1999, he continued by winning the 200 m (20.60) and 400 m (45.82) gold medals at the 1999 Greek Athletics Championships in Athens. His first European success was when he won the 400 m bronze medal at the 1999 European Cup in Paris with a time of 45.66. While Kenteris was eliminated in the 400 m heats of the indoor world championships, he returned that summer as a 200 m runner at the Outdoor World Championships in Seville. Kenteris won his heat # 5, defeating then 100 m world record holder Maurice Greene, but did not start the quarter-finals due to injury. The following year, Kenteris won the 4 × 100 m relay gold (40.46) at the 2000 Greek Athletics Championships in Athens, and also the 4 × 100 m relay silver (38.67) and 200 m bronze (20.48) at the 2000 European Cup in Gateshead.

Although Kenteris had established himself as a medal-winning national and European sprinter, few had heard of his name when he surprised by qualifying for the 200 m final at the 2000 Summer Olympics in Sydney. Although defending Olympic champion Michael Johnson and reigning world champion Maurice Greene did not compete, still nobody had included Kenteris in the list of medal favourites despite his being the fastest European at 200 m that summer with 20.25 seconds from June, but Kenteris raced to the gold medal with a time of 20.09, denying Britain's Darren Campbell and Ato Boldon of Trinidad and Tobago. In doing so, Kenteris became the first white male to win a 200 m sprinting medal at the Olympics since Pietro Mennea achieved the feat, winning the 200 m gold at the 1980 Summer Olympics in Moscow. He also competed in the 4 × 100 m relay qualifying, but failed to reach the finals and took ninth place in 38.80 seconds.

In 2001, Kenteris won his first gold medal in 100 m (10.21) at the 2001 Greek Athletics Championships in Athens. Success continued, as Kenteris won his first 200 m gold medal (20.31) and the silver medal in 100 m (10.15 PB) at the 2001 European Cup in Bremen, and 200 m gold at the 2001 Athens Grand Prix Tsiklitiria with a performance of 20.10. He also won the 200 m title (20.04) at the 2001 World Championships in Edmonton after a season where he mostly stayed out of international competition. The following year, he won the 200 m (20.18) and 4 × 400 m relay (3:14.48) gold medals at the 2002 Greek Athletics Championships in Trikala. Kenteris completed his trilogy by also winning the European title at the 2002 European Athletics Championships in Munich with a time of 19.85, his personal best. This performance still stands as the national record in 200 m. The next year, Kenteris took part in the 2003 European Cup in Florence where he won the 200 m gold (20.37) and 4 × 400 m relay silver (3:02.69). Upon returning in Athens, he won the 200 m gold (20.30) at the 2003 Athens Grand Prix Tsiklitiria.

For the 2004 Summer Olympics, Kenteris was one of the hopes of the home crowd for winning a gold medal in athletics and favourite to light the Olympic flame, as he had won the 100 m (10.18) and 4 × 100 m relay (41.16) gold medals at the 2004 Greek Championship in Athens and the 200 m gold (20.27) at the 2004 Athens Grand Prix Tsiklitiria, just one month before the Summer Olympics. However, on the day prior to the Games, Kenteris and his training partner Ekaterini Thanou failed to attend a drug test. While they claimed to have been injured in a motorcycle accident – in a frantic attempt to return to the Olympic village for the test upon hearing the news in the media – an official Greek investigation would later find that the alleged accident had been staged. In the ensuing doping scandal, Kenteris and Thanou announced their withdrawal from the Games on August 18, after a hearing before the Disciplinary Commission of the IOC, for what they described to be "in the interests of the country".

Kenteris retired from athletics and disappeared from the public eye following his withdrawal. After his retirement, Kenteris was offered an honorary officer position in the Hellenic Air Force by the Greek state, but he quit in 2011. In May 2011 he was (along with Thanou) given a suspended jail sentence of 31 months, after being charged with staging the crash, but an appeals court overturned this ruling. The World Athletics has banned him from entering the stadiums, as evidence was found that his coach was also involved in the BALCO scandal.

== Personal bests ==
Date	Event	Venue	Performance
23 June 2001	100 metres	Bremen, Germany	10.15
9 August 2002	200 metres	Munich, Germany	19.85 CR, EL, NR
27 July 1998	400 metres	Thessaloniki, Greece	45.60
9 February 2000	200 metres (indoor)	Peiraias, Greece	20.80
13 February 1999	400 metres (indoor)	Peiraias, Greece	46.36 NR

As of August 2024, his 200 m time is also the track record for Munich.

Sporting positions
Preceded by (United States) Joshua J. Johnson	Men's 200 m Best Year Performance alongside (United States) Shawn Crawford; 2002	Succeeded by (United States) Bernard Williams
