= Toshiyuki Fujimoto =

Japanese sprinter

Personal information
- Nationality: Japanese
- Born: 25 June 1979 (age 47) Hyogo Prefecture, Japan
- Education: Tokai University
- Height: 1.71 m (5 ft 7 in)
- Weight: 71 kg (157 lb)

Sport
- Country: Japan
- Sport: Track and field
- Event: 200 metres

Achievements and titles
- Personal best(s): 100 m: 10.42 (2003); 200 m: 20.56 (2003)

Toshiyuki Fujimoto (藤本 俊之, Fujimoto Toshiyuki; born 25 June 1979 in Hyogo Prefecture) is a Japanese sprinter who specialized in the 200 metres. He finished fourth in the 4 × 100 metres relay at the 2001 World Championships, together with teammates Ryo Matsuda, Shingo Suetsugu and Nobuharu Asahara.

== Personal bests ==
Event	Time (s)	Competition	Venue	Date	Notes
100 m	10.42 (+1.6 m/s)	Mikio Oda Memorial	Hiroshima, Japan	29 April 2003	
100 m	10.30 (+4.3 m/s)	Mikio Oda Memorial	Hiroshima, Japan	29 April 2003	Wind-assisted
200 m	20.56 (+1.0 m/s)	World Championships	Edmonton, Canada	8 August 2001	

== International competition ==
Year	Competition	Venue	Position	Event	Time	Notes
Representing Japan
2001	World Championships	Edmonton, Canada	13th (sf)	200 m	20.56 (wind: +1.0 m/s)	PB
2001	World Championships	Edmonton, Canada	4th	4×100 m relay	38.96 (relay leg: 3rd)	
