= Matic Osovnikar =

Slovenian sprinter (born 1980)

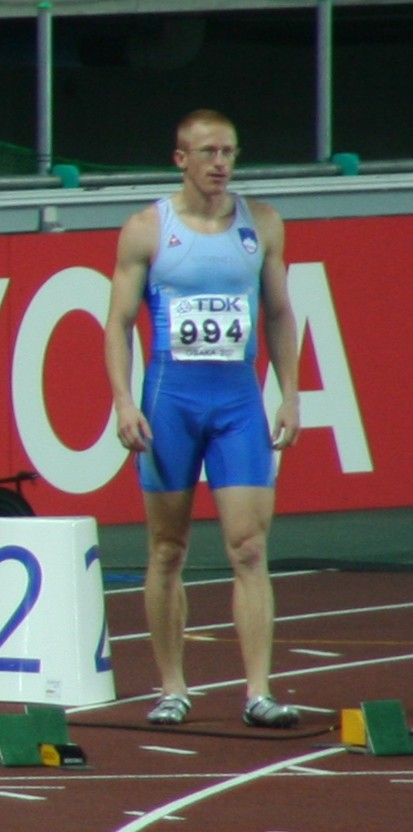
- Osovnikar at the 2007 World Championships

Medal record

Men's Athletics

Representing Slovenia

European Championships
Bronze medal – third place	2006 Gothenburg	100 metres

Mediterranean Games
Gold medal – first place	2005 Almería	100 metres
Gold medal – first place	2005 Almería	200 metres
Bronze medal – third place	2005 Almería	4x100 m relay

Matic Osovnikar (born January 19, 1980, in Kranj) is a former Slovenian athlete specializing in the 100 metres. Osovnikar competed in the 2004 Summer Olympics where he achieved third place in his 100 metres heat, thus making through to the second round but narrowly missed out on a placing in the semi-finals after achieving fourth place in his second round heat.

He was the bronze medalist in the 100 m at the 2006 European Athletics Championships, setting a new national record (10.14 s).

He finished 7th in the 100 m final at the 2007 World Championships in Osaka with a time of 10.23 s.

At the 2008 Summer Olympics, Osovnikar competed at the 100 metres and placed 3rd in his heat after Samuel Francis and Marc Burns in a time of 10.46 seconds. He qualified for the second round in which he improved his time to 10.24 seconds. However, he was unable to qualify for the semi-finals as he finished in 6th place of his heat. He also took part in the 200 metres finishing fourth with a time of 20.89 seconds in his first round heat. With 20.95 seconds in the second round he only placed eighth in his heat, which was not enough for the semi-finals.

== Personal bests ==
100m : 10.13 (Osaka 2007)
200m : 20.47 (Athens 2004)

== Competition record ==
Year	Competition	Venue	Position	Event	Notes
Representing Slovenia
1998	World Junior Championships	Annecy, France	17th (h)	4 × 100 m relay	41.18
2000	Olympic Games	Sydney, Australia	15th (h)	4 × 100 m relay	39.25
2001	European U23 Championships	Amsterdam, Netherlands	4th	100m	10.47 w (wind: 2.2 m/s)
2001	European U23 Championships	Amsterdam, Netherlands	12th (h)	200m	21.41 (wind: 0.1 m/s)
2001	European U23 Championships	Amsterdam, Netherlands	3rd	4 × 100 m relay	39.95
2001	Mediterranean Games	Radès, Tunisia	6th	100 m	10.32 (w)
2002	European Indoor Championships	Vienna, Austria	21st (h)	200 m	21.26
2002	European Championships	Munich, Germany	15th (sf)	100 m	10.49
2002	European Championships	Munich, Germany	33rd (h)	200 m	21.55
2002	European Championships	Munich, Germany	10th (h)	4 × 100 m relay	39.71
2003	World Indoor Championships	Birmingham, United Kingdom	4th	200 m	21.17
2003	World Championships	Paris, France	26th (qf)	100 m	10.35
2004	World Indoor Championships	Budapest, Hungary	5th	60 m	6.58
2004	Olympic Games	Athens, Greece	25th (qf)	100 m	10.26
2004	Olympic Games	Athens, Greece	15th (sf)	200 m	20.89
2005	European Indoor Championships	Madrid, Spain	6th (sf)	60 m	6.66
2005	European Indoor Championships	Madrid, Spain	14th (h)	200 m	21.09
2005	Mediterranean Games	Almería, Spain	1st	100 m	10.35
2005	Mediterranean Games	Almería, Spain	1st	200 m	20.75
2005	Mediterranean Games	Almería, Spain	3rd	4 × 100 m relay	39.57
2005	World Championships	Helsinki, Finland	21st (qf)	100 m	10.48
2005	World Championships	Helsinki, Finland	31st (h)	200 m	20.94
2006	World Indoor Championships	Moscow, Russia	4th	60 m	6.58
2006	European Championships	Gothenburg, Sweden	3rd	100 m	10.14
2006	European Championships	Gothenburg, Sweden	14th (sf)	200 m	21.08
2006	European Championships	Gothenburg, Sweden	–	4 × 100 m relay	DNF
2007	European Indoor Championships	Birmingham, United Kingdom	4th	60 m	6.63
2007	World Championships	Osaka, Japan	7th	100 m	10.23
2007	World Championships	Osaka, Japan	17th (qf)	200 m	20.65
2008	Olympic Games	Beijing, China	22nd (qf)	100 m	10.24
2008	Olympic Games	Beijing, China	27th (h)	200 m	20.95
2009	European Indoor Championships	Turin, Italy	20th (h)	60 m	6.74
2009	World Championships	Berlin, Germany	51st (h)	100 m	10.52
2010	European Championships	Barcelona, Spain	18th (sf)	100 m	10.51
2010	European Championships	Barcelona, Spain	28th (h)	200 m	21.36
2010	European Championships	Barcelona, Spain	–	4 × 100 m relay	DQ
2012	European Championships	Helsinki, Finland	26th (h)	100 m	10.60
