= Marlon Devonish =

English sprinter (born 1976)

Marlon Devonish MBE
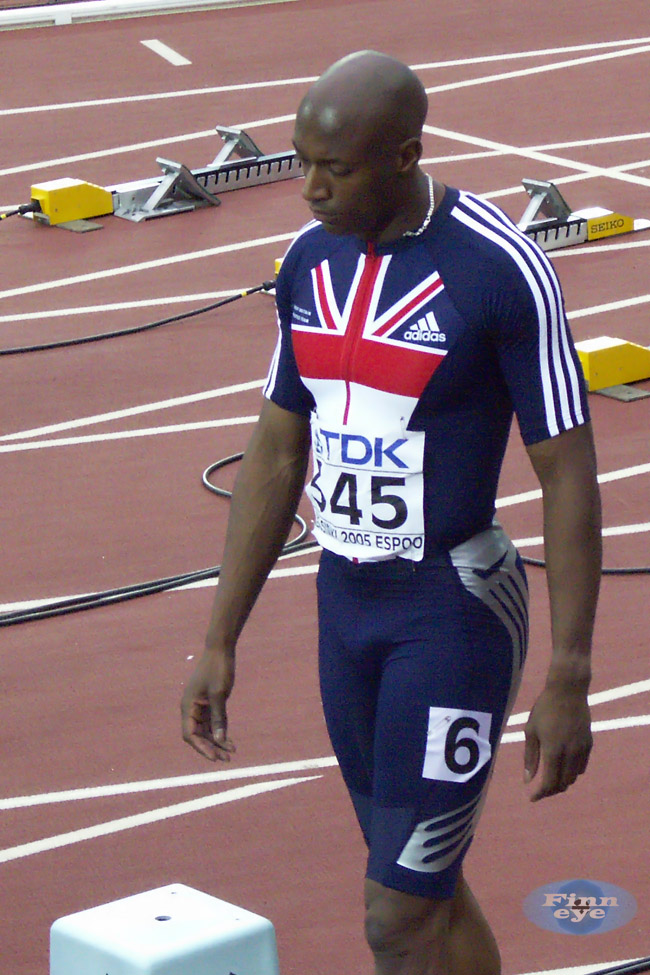
- Devonish at the 2005 World Championships in Helsinki

Personal information
- Nationality: British (English)
- Born: 1 June 1976 (age 50) Coventry, England
- Height: 180 cm (5 ft 11 in)
- Weight: 72 kg (159 lb)

Sport
- Sport: Athletics
- Event: Sprints

Achievements and titles
- Personal bests: 100 m: 10.06 s (Lausanne 2007) 150 m: 14.87 s (Manchester 2011) 200 m: 20.19 s (Manchester 2002)
Medal record
Men's athletics
Representing Great Britain
Olympic Games
Gold medal – first place	2004 Athens	4 × 100 m relay
World Championships
Silver medal – second place	1999 Sevilla	4 × 100 m relay
Bronze medal – third place	2005 Helsinki	4 × 100 m relay
Bronze medal – third place	2007 Osaka	4 × 100 m relay
Bronze medal – third place	2009 Berlin	4 × 100 m relay
European Championships
Gold medal – first place	2006 Gothenburg	4 × 100 m relay
Bronze medal – third place	2002 Munich	200 m
Bronze medal – third place	2006 Gothenburg	200 m
World Indoor Championships
Gold medal – first place	2003 Birmingham	200 m
Representing England
Commonwealth Games
Gold medal – first place	1998 Kuala Lumpur	4 × 100 m relay
Gold medal – first place	2002 Manchester	4 × 100 m relay
Gold medal – first place	2010 Delhi	4 × 100 m relay
Silver medal – second place	2002 Manchester	200 m

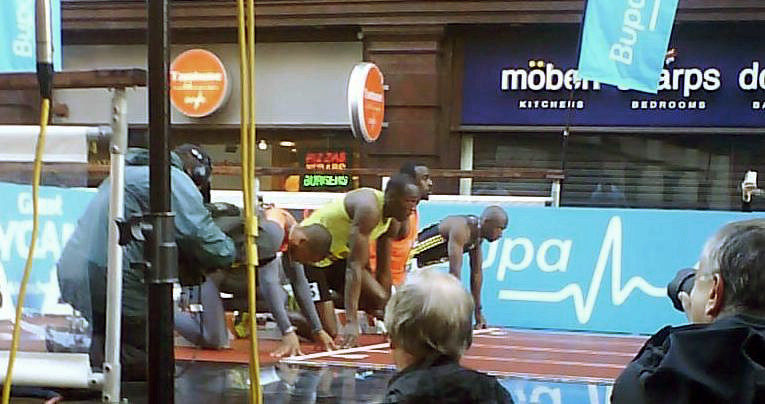
Devonish (right) in the starting blocks before the 150 metres race at the Manchester City Games.

Marlon Ronald Devonish, MBE (born 1 June 1976) is an English former sprinter who competed in the 100 metres and 200 metres. A prodigious relay runner with particular strength as a 'bend' runner, Devonish ran the third leg for the Great Britain quartet which won the 4 × 100 metres at the 2004 Olympic Games, and won four World Championship medals in the same event in 1999, 2005, 2007 and 2009. With further relay gold medals at European and Commonwealth Games level, his sole senior individual international championship gold was achieved indoors, winning the 200 metres event at the World Indoors championship in 2003.

== Early life ==
Devonish attended Caludon Castle School in Coventry, where his athletic talent was first discovered by his P.E. teacher Timothy Coleman who took him to Coventry Godiva Harriers athletics club.

== Career ==
He is a member of the Coventry Godiva Harriers athletics club and was coached by Tony Lester. Early in his career he was successful at both 100 and 200-metre distances, winning English Schools and European Junior titles at both, but in later years he concentrated mostly on the longer distance. He was also a regular member of both the British and, at the Commonwealth Games, English 4 × 100-metre sprint relay teams, to some considerable success. He is a current Commonwealth Games record holder in the relay event.

The most notable achievement of his career came at the 2004 Summer Olympics in Athens. There Devonish, along with Jason Gardener, Darren Campbell and Mark Lewis-Francis, won a gold medal in the 4 × 100 m. relay, where the quartet defeated the pre-race favourites, United States team, by just 0.01 seconds, in a season's best of 38.07.

At the British Championships (and team trials for the 2006 European Championships) in July 2006, Devonish became the first man since Linford Christie in 1988 to win both the 100 m and 200 m races at the event. At the championship finals, he took the bronze medal in the 200 m.

Devonish retained his 100 m title at the British Championships the following year. For the 2007 season Devonish improved his performance in the 100 m with a new personal best and competed in this event at the 2007 World Championships in Osaka rather than the 200 m which he had previously specialised in. Devonish finished 6th in the 100 m final.

Devonish represented Great Britain at the 2008 Summer Olympics in Beijing. He competed at the 4 × 100 metres relay together with Simeon Williamson, Tyrone Edgar and Craig Pickering. In their qualification heat they were disqualified and eliminated. He also took part in the 200 metres individual, finishing first with a time of 20.49 seconds in his first round heat. With 20.43 seconds in his second round he only placed fourth in his heat, but his time was among the four best losing times and enough to qualify for the semi-finals. There he came to 20.57 seconds and the seventh time in his race, which was not enough for the final.

He competed at the 2009 Manchester City Games, finishing second in the 150 metres final in 15.07 seconds. He was beaten by Usain Bolt who ran a world best-beating time.

On 22 August 2009, Devonish was a member of the Great Britain and Northern Ireland men's 4 × 100 m relay team that took bronze at the IAAF World Championships in Berlin with a season's best of 38.02. Harry Aikines-Aryeetey, Simeon Williamson and Tyrone Edgar ran the other legs.

Devonish was a five-times British 200 metres champion after winning the British AAA Championships title in 1997, 2001, 2002 and 2006 and the 2007 British Athletics Championships.

== Post-athletics ==
On 16 July 2013, Devonish was brought in as sprint coach for Gloucester Rugby at Kingsholm Stadium, Gloucester.

On 8 January 2018, Devonish started working for the British International School Shanghai located in Puxi, Shanghai, China as their elite athlete performance coach in residence.

== International competition record ==
Year	Competition	Venue	Position	Event	Notes
Representing Great Britain and England
1994	World Junior Championships	Lisbon, Portugal	1st (h)	4 × 100 m relay	39.92
1995	European Junior Championships	Nyíregyháza, Hungary	1st	200 m	21.04
1995	European Junior Championships	Nyíregyháza, Hungary	1st	4 × 100 m relay	39.43
1996	European Indoor Championships	Stockholm, Sweden	11th (sf)	200 m	21.86
1997	European U23 Championships	Turku, Finland	3rd	100 m	10.32 w (+2.8 m/s)
1997	European U23 Championships	Turku, Finland	1st	4 × 100 m relay	38.99
1997	World Championships	Athens, Greece	35th (qf)	100 m	10.37
1997	World Championships	Athens, Greece	6th (h)	4 × 100 m relay	38.47
1998	European Championships	Budapest, Hungary	5th	100 m	10.24
1998	European Championships	Budapest, Hungary	1st (h)	4 × 100 m relay	38.47
1998	Commonwealth Games	Kuala Lumpur, Malaysia	8th	100 m	10.22
1998	Commonwealth Games	Kuala Lumpur, Malaysia	1st	4 × 100 m relay	38.20
1998	World Cup	Johannesburg, South Africa	1st	4 × 100 m relay	38.09
1999	European Cup	Paris, France	1st	4 × 100 m relay	38.16
1999	World Championships	Seville, Spain	7th (sf)	200 m	20.25
1999	World Championships	Seville, Spain	2nd	4 × 100 m relay	37.73
2000	Olympic Games	Sydney, Australia	27th (sf)	200 m	20.82
2000	Olympic Games	Sydney, Australia	–	4 × 100 m relay	DQ
2001	World Championships	Edmonton, Canada	8th	200 m	20.38
2001	World Championships	Edmonton, Canada	–	4 × 100 m relay	DNF
2001	Goodwill Games	Brisbane, Australia	4th	200 m	20.74
2001	Goodwill Games	Brisbane, Australia	1st	4 × 100 m relay	38.71
2002	Commonwealth Games	Manchester, United Kingdom	2nd	200 m	20.19
2002	Commonwealth Games	Manchester, United Kingdom	1st	4 × 100 m relay	38.62
2002	European Championships	Munich, Germany	3rd	200 m	20.24
2002	European Championships	Munich, Germany	–	4 × 100 m relay	DQ
2002	World Cup	Madrid, Spain	3rd	200 m relay	20.32
2002	World Cup	Madrid, Spain	6th	4 × 100 m relay	39.23
2003	World Indoor Championships	Birmingham, United Kingdom	1st	200 m	20.62
2003	World Championships	Paris, France	–	4 × 100 m relay	DQ
2004	Olympic Games	Athens, Greece	1st	4 × 100 m relay	38.07
2005	World Championships	Helsinki, Finland	14th (sf)	100 m	10.24
2005	World Championships	Helsinki, Finland	12th (sf)	200 m	20.93
2005	World Championships	Helsinki, Finland	3rd	4 × 100 m relay	38.27
2006	Commonwealth Games	Melbourne, Australia	8th	100 m	10.30
2006	Commonwealth Games	Melbourne, Australia	12th (sf)	200 m	20.93
2006	Commonwealth Games	Melbourne, Australia	–	4 × 100 m relay	DNF
2006	Commonwealth Games	Melbourne, Australia	4th	4 × 400 m relay	3:02.01
2006	European Championships	Gothenburg, Sweden	3rd	200 m	20.54
2006	European Championships	Gothenburg, Sweden	1st	4 × 100 m relay	38.91
2006	World Cup	Athens, Greece	2nd	4 × 100 m relay	38.45^{1}
2007	World Championships	Osaka, Japan	6th	100 m	10.14
2007	World Championships	Osaka, Japan	3rd	4 × 100 m relay	37.90
2008	Olympic Games	Beijing, China	13th (sf)	200 m	20.57
2008	Olympic Games	Beijing, China	1st	4 × 100 m relay	DQ
2009	World Championships	Berlin, Germany	12th (sf)	200 m	20.62
2009	World Championships	Berlin, Germany	3rd	4 × 100 m relay	38.02
2010	European Championships	Barcelona, Spain	4th	200 m	20.62
2010	European Championships	Barcelona, Spain	9th (h)	4 × 100 m relay	39.49
2010	Commonwealth Games	Delhi, India	5th	200 m	20.75
2010	Commonwealth Games	Delhi, India	1st	4 × 100 m relay	38.74
2011	World Championships	Daegu, South Korea	16th (sf)	100 m	10.25
2011	World Championships	Daegu, South Korea	4th (h)	4 × 100 m relay	38.29^{2}

^{1}Representing Europe
^{2}Did not finish in the final

== Personal bests ==
Distance	Time	Wind	Location	Date
100 m	10.06 sec	+ 1.3 m/s	Lausanne	10 July 2007
200 m	20.19 sec	+ 1.4 m/s	Manchester	29 July 2002
