= Marcin Urbaś =

Polish sprinter (born 1976)

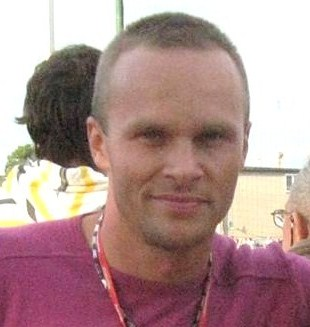
- Urbaś in 2010

Personal information
- Nationality: Polish
- Born: 17 September 1976 (age 50) Kraków, Poland
- Height: 5 ft 9 in (1.75 m)

Sport
- Sport: Running
- Event: 100 metres
Medal record
Men's athletics
Representing Poland
European Championships
| Silver medal – second place | 2002 Munich | 4 × 100 m relay |
European Indoor Championships
| Gold medal – first place | 2002 Vienna | 200 metres |
| Bronze medal – third place | 2005 Madrid | 200 metres |
Summer Universiade
| Gold medal – first place | 2001 Beijing | 200 metres |

Marcin Krzysztof Urbaś (born September 17, 1976) is a former Polish track and field athlete. He is the Polish record holder for the 200 metres dash with 19.98 seconds. He is now a sprinting coach.

== Track and field ==
Urbaś is the Polish national record holder over the half-a-lap (19.98 seconds in the semi-final of the 1999 World Championships in Seville, Spain. Urbaś is one of the four Polish athletes who brought the Polish national records in dashes up-to-the global standards: Marian Woronin 10.00 (9.992) over 100 m; Marcin Urbaś 19.98 over 200m; and Tomasz Czubak and Robert Maćkowiak over 400 m, 44.62 and 44.84, respectively. Urbaś improved the Polish national record of 20 years by Leszek Dunecki.

== Results and honors ==
He won the gold medal over a lap indoor in the European Indoor Championships in 2002, and the bronze medal in 2005. Urbas has been part of the Polish national 4 × 100 m relay who won the silver medal during the European (outdoor) Championships in 2002.

== Competition record ==
| Year | Competition | Venue | Position | Event | Notes |
Representing Poland
| 1999 | World Indoor Championships | Maebashi, Japan | 8th (sf) | 200 m | 21.01 |
| 1999 | Universiade | Palma, Spain | 7th | 4 × 100 m relay | 39.46 |
| 1999 | World Championships | Seville, Spain | 5th | 200 m | 20.30 |
| 1999 | World Championships | Seville, Spain | 5th | 4 × 100 m relay | 38.70 |
| 2000 | European Indoor Championships | Ghent, Belgium | – | 200 m | DNF |
| 2000 | Olympic Games | Sydney, Australia | 13th (qf) | 200 m | 20.43 |
| 2000 | Olympic Games | Sydney, Australia | 8th | 4 × 100 m relay | 38.96 |
| 2001 | World Championships | Edmonton, Canada | 12th (sf) | 200 m | 20.48 |
| 2001 | World Championships | Edmonton, Canada | 7th (sf) | 4 × 100 m relay | 38.92 |
| 2001 | Universiade | Beijing, China | 1st | 200 m | 20.56 |
| 2002 | European Indoor Championships | Vienna, Austria | 1st | 200 m | 20.64 |
| 2002 | European Championships | Munich, Germany | 8th | 200 m | DNF |
| 2002 | European Championships | Munich, Germany | 2nd | 4 × 100 m relay | 38.71 |
| 2003 | World Championships | Paris, France | 23rd (qf) | 200 m | 20.72 |
| 2003 | World Championships | Paris, France | 5th | 4 × 100 m relay | 38.96 |
| 2004 | World Indoor Championships | Budapest, Hungary | 6th | 200 m | 21.49 |
| 2004 | Olympic Games | Athens, Greece | 23rd (h) | 200 m | 20.71 |
| 2004 | Olympic Games | Athens, Greece | 5th | 4 × 100 m relay | 38.54 |
| 2005 | European Indoor Championships | Madrid, Spain | 3rd | 200 m | 21.04 |
| 2005 | World Championships | Helsinki, Finland | – | 4 × 100 m relay | DNF |
| 2006 | European Championships | Gothenburg, Sweden | 26th (sf) | 200 m | 21.39 |

== Other achievements ==
SPAR CUP: European National Teams' (Men's) Super League:
200 m: Bronze in 2006; Silver in 2002; Bronze in 2001; Gold in 1999; 4 × 100 m relay: Gold in 2006

== Music ==
Aside of his sport career he is a vocalist in Polish death metal band Sceptic. Marcin Urbaś recorded with them three albums: Blind Existence (1999), Unbeliever's Script (2003) and Nailed to Ignorance (2022).

== Retirement ==
After Tadeusz Osik refused to include him on the Polish national 4 × 100 m relay for the 2008 Summer Olympics, Urbas was removed from the list of the members of The Polish national track and field team; therefore, PZLA or the Polish Track and Field Association did stop supporting him financially. Because of the lack of financial support, Mr. Urbas as of 2009 has retired as a professional athlete. Mr. Urbas did claim that he would have been able of running close to his Personal Best of 19.98s over 200 meters (20.1—20.2 over 200m) only if, he would be capable of investing into himself around 80,000 zlotya or, at the time, around 25,000 dollars.

Urbas is a co-owner of the Urban Sprint Group (in Poland) and, in particular, helps with the Projekt Elita Rugby 7: Rio 2016. The goals of Mr. Urbas are to, in general, help Polish runners, all over Poland, run smarter and achieve their goals; and in particular, to help the Polish national Rugby team in qualifying to the Olympics in 2016.

== See also ==
- Polish records in athletics
- 2002 European Athletics Championships
- 2002 European Athletics Indoor Championships
- 1999 World Championships in Athletics – Men's 200 metres
