= Jermaine Joseph =

Canadian retired sprinter (born 1980)

Jermaine Joseph (born 25 July 1980) is a Canadian retired sprinter who specialized in the 200 metres.

Joseph was an All-American sprinter for the UTEP Miners track and field team, placing 3rd in the 4 × 100 metres relay at the 2001 NCAA Division I Outdoor Track and Field Championships.

He won a bronze medal at the 1999 Pan American Junior Athletics Championships. At the top level he competed in 200 metres at the 1999 World Championships, only reaching the heats. He also competed in relay at the 2001 and 2003 World Championships without reaching the final. The Canadian team finished fourth at the 2002 Commonwealth Games relay, but in the 200 metres he did not reach the final (due to unknowingly being selected to run, despite his injuries at the time, in turn forcing him to retire)

He became Canadian 200 metre champion in 2002.

His personal best times were 10.29 seconds in the 100 metres, achieved in June 2001 in Edmonton; and 20.48 seconds in the 200 metres, achieved in June 2002 in the same city.
