= Piotr Balcerzak =

Polish sprinter (born 1975)

Personal information
- Nationality: Polish
- Born: 25 June 1975 (age 51) Warsaw, Poland
- Height: 1.75 m (5 ft 9 in)
- Weight: 68 kg (150 lb)

Sport
- Sport: Athletics
- Event: 100 m
Medal record
Men's athletics
Representing Poland
European Championships
Silver medal – second place	2002 Munich	4×100 m
Bronze medal – third place	1998 Budapest	4×100 m

Piotr Balcerzak (born 25 June 1975) is a former Polish sprint athlete. He achieved the most success with the Polish 4 × 100 meters relay.

He is married to another Polish sprinter, Joanna Niełacna.

== Competition record ==
Year	Competition	Venue	Position	Event	Notes
Representing Poland
1997	European U23 Championships	Turku, Finland	10th (sf)	100 m	10.44 w (wind: +3.0 m/s)
1997	European U23 Championships	Turku, Finland	2nd	4 × 100 m relay	39.27
1997	World Championships	Athens, Greece	27th (qf)	100 m	10.32
1997	World Championships	Athens, Greece	10th (sf)	4 × 100 m relay	38.79
1998	European Championships	Budapest, Hungary	23rd (h)	200 m	21.22
1998	European Championships	Budapest, Hungary	3rd	100 m	38.98
1999	Universiade	Palma, Spain	7th	4 × 100 m relay	39.46
1999	World Championships	Seville, Spain	30th (qf)	100 m	10.29
1999	World Championships	Seville, Spain	5th	4 × 100 m relay	38.70
2000	European Indoor Championships	Ghent, Belgium	16th (h)	60 m	6.73
2000	Olympic Games	Sydney, Australia	29th (qf)	100 m	10.38
2000	Olympic Games	Sydney, Australia	8th	4 × 100 m relay	38.96
2001	World Championships	Edmonton, Canada	32nd (qf)	100 m	10.33
2001	World Championships	Edmonton, Canada	6th	4 × 100 m relay	39.71
2002	European Championships	Munich, Germany	25th (qf)	100 m	10.50
2002	European Championships	Munich, Germany	2nd (h)	4 × 100 m relay	38.98
2003	World Championships	Paris, France	5th	4 × 100 m relay	38.96

== Personal bests ==
Outdoor

- 100 m – 10.15 (1999 Kraków)
- 150 m – 15.61 (2002 Bielsko-Biała)
- 200 m – 20.72 (1999 Pátra, 2000 Kraków)

Indoor

- 60 m – 6.62 (2000 Spała)
- 200 m – 21.47 (2000 Spała)
