= Ricardo Williams (sprinter) =

Jamaican sprinter

Ricardo Williams (born 29 September 1976) is a retired Jamaican sprinter who competed primarily in the 200 metres. He represented his country at the 2000 Summer Olympics, as well as two World Championships, in 2001 and 2003.

In 1992, Williams beat his classmate Omar Bailey, then considered St. Jago High School's fastest sprinter. He was called "Flash" since then.

Williams ran for Southwestern Christian College before transferring to Texas Christian University. He was an All-American for the TCU Horned Frogs track and field team, placing 8th in the 200 metres at the 1999 NCAA Division I Indoor Track and Field Championships.

== Competition record ==
Year	Competition	Venue	Position	Event	Notes
Representing Jamaica
1995	CARIFTA Games (U20)	George Town, Cayman Islands	4th	100 m	10.85
1995	CARIFTA Games (U20)	George Town, Cayman Islands	4th	200 m	21.54
1995	CARIFTA Games (U20)	George Town, Cayman Islands	1st	4x100 m relay	40.68
1995	Pan American Junior Championships	Santiago, Chile	4th	100 m	10.5
1995	Pan American Junior Championships	Santiago, Chile	1st	4x100 m relay	40.23
2000	Olympic Games	Sydney, Australia	43rd (h)	200 m	21.09
2001	World Championships	Edmonton, Canada	19th (qf)	200 m	20.65
2001	World Championships	Edmonton, Canada	19th (h)	4x100 m relay	40.05
2002	Commonwealth Games	Manchester, United Kingdom	14th (sf)	200 m	21.13
2003	World Championships	Paris, France	10th (sf)	200 m	20.45
2003	World Championships	Paris, France	2nd (sf)	4x100 m relay	38.45
2006	World Indoor Championships	Moscow, Russia	40th (h)	60 m	6.91
2006	World Indoor Championships	Moscow, Russia	–	4x400 m relay	DNF

== Personal bests ==
Outdoor

- 100 metres – 10.19 (+0.9 m/s) (Prague 2007)
- 200 metres – 20.33 (-0.9 m/s) (Yokohama 2000)

Indoor

- 60 metres – 6.68 (Norman 2006)
