= Julien Dunkley =

Jamaican track and field athlete

Medal record

Men's athletics

Representing Jamaica

CAC Championships
| Silver medal – second place | 2001 Guatemala City | 100 m |

Julien Dunkley (born 20 December 1975) is a retired Jamaican track and field athlete who specialised in sprint events.

He first began competing for Jamaica internationally in 2001. At the 2001 Central American and Caribbean Championships in Athletics he won the silver medal over the 100 metres in a time of 10.35 seconds behind Kim Collins. He was selected to compete at the 2001 World Championships in Athletics, forming part of the men's relay team. However, the team including Dwight Thomas, Christopher Williams and Ricardo Williams finished last in their heat.

Dunkley began studying at East Carolina University in the United States. At the age of 28 he won the 60 metres dash at the NCAA Men's Indoor Track and Field Championship in 2003, beating Pierre Browne with a university record of 6.54 seconds. This was also the college's first NCAA victory for the ECU Pirates men's track and field team. However, he was stripped of his title soon after as he was ruled ineligible as a student-athlete (although the specific reason for the disqualification was not disclosed).

He turned professional that year and began training with sprint coach Trevor Graham, who also trained Justin Gatlin, Shawn Crawford and Duane Ross among others. He improved his 100 m personal best to 10.09 seconds in La Chaux-de-Fonds that August. Later that month he ran at the 2003 World Championships in Athletics in Paris, and aided the Jamaican team into the final. He was replaced by Asafa Powell for the final race but the team did not finish the race.

After low-key 2006 and 2007 seasons, he re-emerged in 2008 with a new personal best of 10.07 seconds in Provo, Utah. At the 2008 Jamaican Athletics Championships he finished sixth in the men's 100 m final. These performances earned Dunkley a place on the 2008 Summer Olympic relay team, what would have been his first Olympic competition. However, his test from the championships came back positive for the anabolic steroid Boldenone thus he was dropped from the squad and received a two-year ban from the sport for the doping violation.

== See also ==
- List of doping cases in athletics
