= Corné du Plessis =

South African sprinter (born 1978)

Personal information
- Born: 20 March 1978 (age 48)

Sport
- Sport: Track and field
Medal record
Representing South Africa
World Championships
Gold medal – first place	2001 Edmonton	4×100 m
African Championships
Gold medal – first place	2008 Addis Ababa	4×100 m
Summer Universiade
Bronze medal – third place	2001 Beijing	200 m

Corné du Plessis (born 20 March 1978) is a South African sprinter. Together with Morne Nagel, Lee-Roy Newton and Mathew Quinn he won a silver medal in 4 × 100 metres relay at the 2001 World Championships in Athletics. Their time of 38.47 seconds was a South African record. Earlier in the season he won the bronze medal in the 200 metres at the 2001 Summer Universiade.

Following the ruling of 13 December 2005 which retroactively disqualified Tim Montgomery and henceforth the American team, the South African team were promoted to gold medallists. Du Plessis won another relay gold medal with South Africa at the 2008 African Championships in Athletics.

== Competition record ==
Year	Competition	Venue	Position	Event	Notes
Representing South Africa
2001	World Championships	Edmonton, Canada	33rd (h)	200 m	20.92
2001	World Championships	Edmonton, Canada	1st	4 × 100 m relay	38.47
2001	Universiade	Beijing, China	7th	100 m	10.54
2001	Universiade	Beijing, China	3rd	200 m	20.58
2008	African Championships	Addis Ababa, Ethiopia	10th (sf)	200 m	21.48
2008	African Championships	Addis Ababa, Ethiopia	1st	4 × 100 m relay	38.75

== Personal bests ==
- 100 metres - 10.25 (2001)
- 200 metres - 20.39 (2001)
