= Gideon Jablonka =

Israeli sprinter

Gidon Jablonka
Personal information
- Nationality: Israel
- Born: גדעון יבלונקה; October 30, 1977 (age 49)

Sport
- Sport: Athletics
- Event: Sprints

Achievements and titles
- Personal bests: 100 metres: 10.29 seconds (2000); 200 metres: 20.89 seconds (2000)

Gidon Jablonka (Hebrew: גדעון יבלונקה; born 30 October 1977) is a retired Israeli sprinter.

Gidon Jablonka competed in the 2000 Olympic 200 metres without reaching the final. He won five national championships. In the 4 x 100 metres relay, he competed at the 1999 World Championships, the 2000 Olympic Games, and the 2001 World Championships without reaching the final.

His personal best times were 10.29 seconds in the 100 metres, achieved in July 2000 in Tel Aviv; and 20.89 seconds in the 200 metres, achieved in July 2000 in Tel Aviv.

== See also ==
- Sports in Israel
- List of Israeli records in athletics
- List of Maccabiah records in athletics
