= Ryo Matsuda (athlete) =

Japanese sprinter (born 1979)

Personal information
- Nationality: Japanese
- Born: 26 December 1979 (age 46) Hiroshima, Japan
- Education: Hiroshima University of Economics
- Height: 1.77 m (5 ft 10 in)
- Weight: 70 kg (150 lb)

Sport
- Country: Japan
- Sport: Track and field
- Event: 200 metres

Achievements and titles
- Personal bests: 100 m: 10.31 (2003); 200 m: 20.59 (2004)

Ryo Matsuda (松田 亮, Matsuda Ryō; born 26 December 1979 in Hiroshima) is a Japanese retired track and field sprinter who specialized in the 200 metres. He competed at the 2001 World Championships, the 2003 World Championships and the 2004 Olympic Games.

== Personal bests ==
Event	Time (s)	Competition	Venue	Date	Notes
100 m	10.31 (+2.0 m/s)	Mikio Oda Memorial	Hiroshima, Japan	29 April 2003	
100 m	10.28 (+2.5 m/s)	Mikio Oda Memorial	Hiroshima, Japan	29 April 2004	Wind-assisted
200 m	20.59 (+1.5 m/s)	Japanese Championships	Tottori, Japan	5 June 2004	

== International competition ==
Year	Competition	Venue	Position	Event	Time (s)
Representing Japan
2001	World Championships	Edmonton, Canada	— (qf)	200 m	DQ
2001	World Championships	Edmonton, Canada	4th	4×100 m relay	38.96 (relay leg: 1st)
2003	World Championships	Paris, France	6th	4×100 m relay	39.05 (relay leg: 3rd)
2004	Olympic Games	Athens, Greece	52nd (h)	200 m	24.59 (wind: 0.0 m/s)
