= Pierre Browne =

Canadian sprinter of Barbadian descent

Pierre Browne (born January 14, 1980) is a Canadian sprinter of Barbadian descent. He represented Canada for the 100 and the 200 meters dash in the 2000 Sydney Olympics, 2002 Commonwealth Games, and the 2004 and 2008 Summer Olympics.

== Biography ==
Browne is the son of Victor and Maisie Browne and father of Alexander Browne. He was born and raised in Toronto, Ontario. He attended Victoria Park Collegiate Institute (formerly known as Victoria Park Secondary School) and graduated in 1998. He won his first gold medal in 1998 in the OFSAA 100 and 200 m dashes. During his years at Victoria Park Collegiate Institute, his coach, Kurt McIntosh personally coached Pierre. After graduating from Victoria Park Collegiate Institute, he attended the Mississippi State University, where he was the best freshman sprinter. He first came into the professional scene in the 2000 NCAA South East Conference. That year, he beat two-time defending champion Nicolas Macrozonaris by half a second and he posted his personal best in the 200 m dash of 20.49 seconds.

At the 2003 NCAA Division I Indoor Track and Field Championships, Browne finished runner-up in the 60 metres with a 6.60-second time. Julien Dunkley of the East Carolina Pirates track and field team originally won the race in 6.54 seconds, but he was later declared ineligible, making Browne the winner.

Browne represented Canada at the 2008 Summer Olympics in Beijing, where he competed at the 100 m sprint and placed 2nd in his heat after Michael Frater in a time of 10.22 seconds. He qualified for the second round in which he failed to qualify for the semi-finals, as he placed sixth in his heat with a time 10.36 seconds. Together with Hank Palmer, Anson Henry and Jared Connaughton he also competed at the 4 × 100 m relay. In their qualification heat they placed second behind Jamaica, but in front of Germany and China. Their time of 38.77 was the fourth out of sixteen participating nations in the first round and they qualified for the final. There they sprinted to a time of 38.66 seconds, which was the sixth time.

== Achievements ==
=== 2004 ===
- Olympic Games, Athens GRE (4 × 100 m) 38.64
- Olympic Games, Athens GRE (100 m) 10.21
- Canadian Championships, Victoria, BC CAN (200 m) 20.67
- Canadian Championships, Victoria, BC CAN (100 m) 10.13
- Modesto Relays, Modesto, CA USA (4 × 100 m) 39.28
- Modesto Relays, Modesto, CA USA (100 m) 10.19
- Texas Relays, Austin, TX USA (100 m) 10.22
- Penn Relays, Philadelphia, PA USA (4 × 100 m) 39.44

=== 2003 ===
- Texas Relays Track Meet, Texas USA (100 m) 10.09w
- Canadian Championships, Victoria, BC CAN (100 m) 10.16
- NCAA Championships, Sacramento, CA USA (100 m) 10.34
- NCAA Championships, Sacramento, CA USA (200 m) 20.95
- World Championships, Paris FRA (4 × 100 m) 38.66
- Penn Relays, Philadelphia, PA USA (4 × 100 m) 39.20

=== 2002 ===
- Canadian Championships, Edmonton, AB CAN (100 m) 9.98w
- Canadian Champs, Edmonton, AB CAN (200 m) 20.80
- Commonwealth Games, Manchester ENG (100 m) 10.12
- SEC Starkville, MS USA (100 m) 1 10.13
- NCAA Championships, Baton Rouge, LA USA (100 m) 10.22
- SEC Starkville MS USA (200 m) 20.41
- NCAA Championships, Baton Rouge, LA USA (200 m) 20.83

=== 2001 ===
- Waco Invitational, Waco, TX USA (200 m) 20.57
- Texas Relay, Austin, TX USA (100 m) 10.19
- Baton Rouge, LA USA (60 m) 6.77

=== 2000 ===
- Olympic Games, Sydney AUS (200 m) 21.28
- Olympic Games, Sydney AUS (4 × 100 m) 38.92
- Canadian Championships, Victoria, BC CAN (100 m) 10.24
- Canadian Championships, Victoria, BC CAN (200 m) 20.58w
- SEC Championships, Baton Rouge, LA USA (100 m) 10.24
- SEC Championships, Baton Rouge, LA USA (200 m) 20.49
