= Adam Basil =

Australian track and field athlete

Personal information
- Born: 14 April 1975 (age 51) Melbourne, Australia

Sport
- Sport: Track and field
Medal record
Representing Australia
World Championships
Bronze medal – third place	2001 Edmonton	4 × 100 m relay

Adam Edward Basil (born 14 April 1975) is a former Australian track and field athlete, specialising in 100 m and 4 × 100 m relay.

Basil joined the Australian Institute of Sport in 2000. He represented Australia at the 1999 World Championships in Seville, Spain, 2003 World Championships in Paris, France and 1994 World Junior Championship in Lisbon, Portugal.

He was part of the 4 × 100 m Australian team (Paul Di Bella, Steve Brimacombe & Matt Shirvington) that won a bronze medal at the 2001 World Championships in Edmonton, Canada and the 2001 Goodwill Games in Brisbane. In Edmonton the team originally placed fourth. The team was later awarded third place after the winning USA team was retrospectively disqualified due to illegal drug infringements.

At the 2003 National 100 m titles Basil placed third behind Patrick Johnson and Matt Shirvington.

He ran the 1st leg for Australia at the 2004 Summer Olympics in Athens in the 4 × 100 m relay with Paul Di Bella, Patrick Johnson and Joshua Ross. The team qualified for the final where they finished 6th with a time of 38.56. This was the first time an Australian Men's 4 × 100 m relay team had made an Olympic Final.

Adam was the strength and conditioning coach at the Melbourne Victory FC and part-time athletics coach at Melbourne Grammar School. In late 2013, he joined the St Kilda Football Club as High Performance coach.

Adam Basil completed his secondary education at Strathmore Secondary College and played junior amateur Australian Rules football at Strathmore Football Club where he won several premierships from under 10s until under 18s, typically dominant either as a central utility or potent forward. It was widely accepted that Adam would play professionally in what would become the Australian Football League but at 18yrs, Adam decided to pursue his dream of representing his country in track athletics.

== See also ==
- Athletics in Australia
