= Mickey Grimes =

American sprinter (born 1976)

Personal information
- Born: October 10, 1976 (age 49) Moreno Valley, California, United States

Sport
- Sport: Track and field

Mickey Grimes (born October 10, 1976) is a former American sprinter who specialized over 100 and 200 metres. He won the 100 metres at the 2003 Pan American Games, but was later stripped of his title for testing positive for ephedrine.

Grimes began his career as a hurdler, winning the CIF California State Meet 300 Hurdles championship in 1995 for Canyon Springs High School in Moreno Valley. In the process, he defeated future double Olympic and double world champion Felix Sanchez.

On August 15, 2003, at the Weltklasse Zürich, Grimes became the 42nd person to break the 10-second barrier, a whisper behind the 41st member, future Olympic Champion Justin Gatlin.

== Doping ==
Grimes tested positive for ephedrine at the 2003 Pan American Games and as a result he was disqualified from the 100 m sprint, which he'd won, and the US 4x100-meter team, which he had been a part of, lost the gold medal. Grimes also received a public warning. On May 25, 2004, he was tested positive for norandrosterone and was ruled ineligible for two years (2004–2006).
