= John Capel Jr. =

American football player and sprinter (born 1978)

John Capel
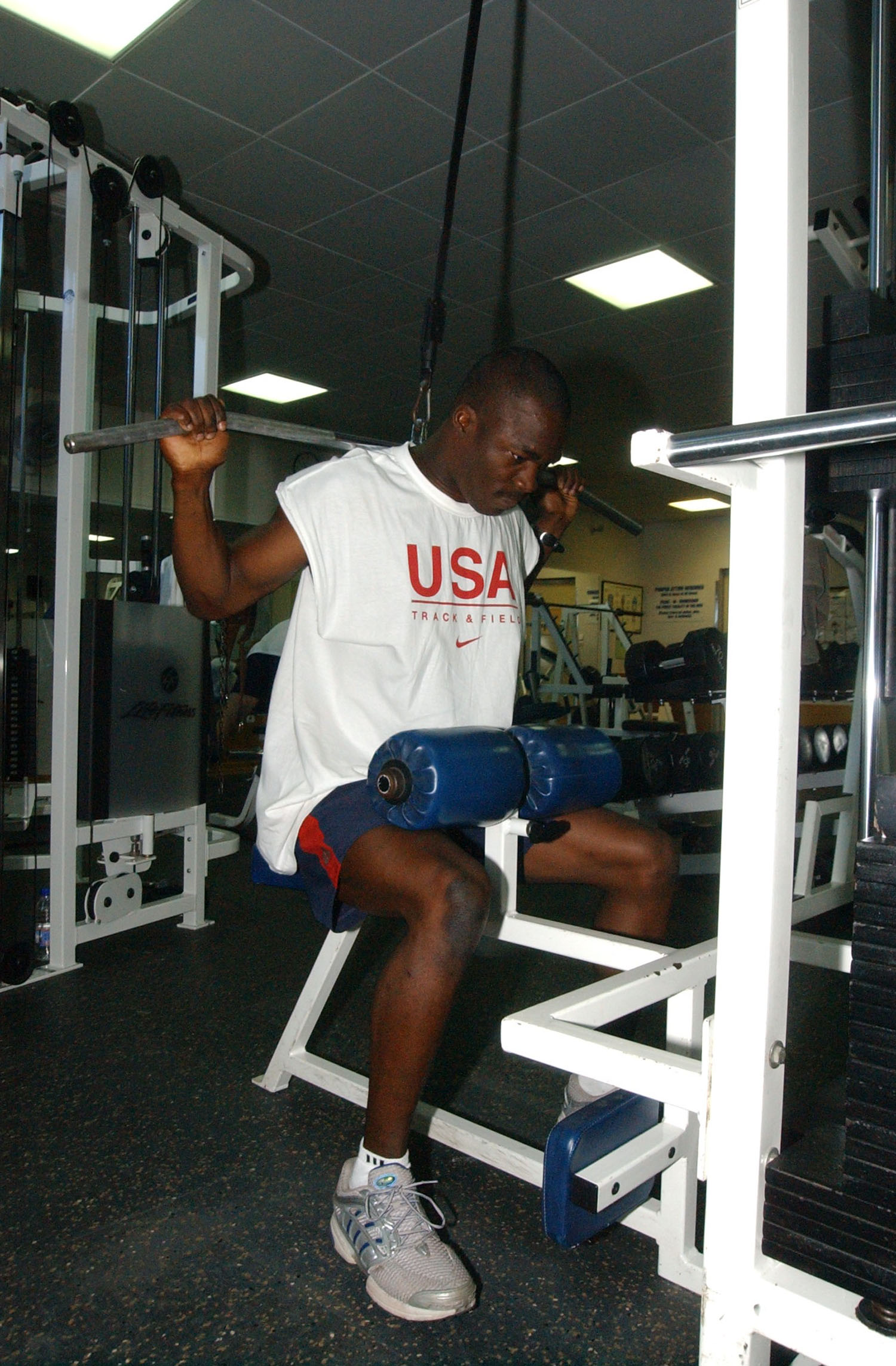
- John Capel works out in the Naval Support Activity (NSA) Fitness Center in preparation for the 2004 Summer Olympic Games.

Personal information
- Full name: John Capel Jr.
- Nationality: United States
- Born: October 27, 1978 (age 48) Brooksville, Florida, U.S.
- Height: 5 ft 11 in (1.80 m)
- Weight: 181 lb (82 kg)

Sport
- Sport: Track and field
- Events: 100 meters, 200 meters
- College team: University of Florida
Medal record
Men's athletics
World Championships
Gold medal – first place	2003 Paris	200 m
Gold medal – first place	2003 Paris	4 × 100 m relay
Bronze medal – third place	2005 Helsinki	200 m
Universiade
Silver medal – second place	1999 Palma de Mallorca	100 m

John Capel Jr. (born October 27, 1978) is an American former track and field athlete who was a world champion sprinter. Capel played college football for the University of Florida, where he was also a member of the Florida Gators track and field team.

== Early years ==
Capel attended Hernando High School, while there he was considered one of the nation's top wide receivers and was also one of the nation's top prep sprinters (winning the 100 and 200 meters at the prestigious National Scholastic Championships in the summer of 1997). He was named to several prep All-American teams. He rated as the nation's top receiver prospect by National Recruiting Advisor and received All-American honors from the publication. He was named to the Parade All-American Team. He ranked among the nation's top 35 prep players by The Sporting News. He played mostly running back, where he rushed for 1,229 yards in 1997 (9.1 avg) with 12 touchdowns and also recorded 28 receptions for 434 yards (15.5 avg) and three touchdowns. He was named to Florida's Super Seniors Team. He won the state 4A championship as a junior in 1997 in both the 100 (10.49) and 200 (21.01) meters.

== College career ==
Capel accepted an athletic scholarship to attend the University of Florida, where he played for coach Steve Spurrier's Florida Gators football team in 1998 and 1999.

Capel played in every game as a true freshman in 1998, earning his only career start when the team opened with a three-receiver formation against South Carolina. He had two receptions for four yards and rushed the ball 11 times for 80 yards (7.3 avg) and a touchdown. He returned eight punts for 77 yards (9.6 avg) and 10 kickoffs for 274 yards (27.4 avg). Against Georgia he scored his first career touchdown, an eight-yard run. Against Syracuse in the Orange Bowl he returned three punts for 29 yards and two kickoffs for 37 yards.

As a sophomore in 1999, Capel again played in every game, listed third on the depth chart at flanker. He did not participate in spring football drills due to schedule conflicts with his commitments to the school's track team. He recorded nine receptions for 84 yards (9.3 avg) and 63 yards on nine carries (7.0 avg). He returned nine kickoffs for 141 yards (15.7 avg) and two punts for -3 yards. Against Alabama in the SEC Championship Game he rushed the ball twice for seven yards. Against Michigan State in the Citrus Bowl he recorded 109 yards on five kickoff returns with a long of 38 yards.

Capel did not play football in 2000, while he was competing as a sprinter on the U.S. Olympic team. After the Olympics, he decided to forgo his remaining NCAA college eligibility and entered the 2001 NFL draft.

== Amateur track career ==
Capel was a standout sprinter in high school, he arrived on the world competition stage in 1999. He withdrew from Florida in April 2000 to concentrate on track.

In 1997, Capel won the National Scholastic 100 (10.49) and 200 (21.01) meter dash titles while attending Hernando High School. In 1998, he ran a personal best 10.40 in the 100 meters at Florida. In 1999, he won the NCAA Outdoor 200-meter championship (19.87). He finished second in the NCAA Outdoor 100 meters (10.03), fourth in the USA Outdoor 200-meter finals (20.29). He ran on the winning 4 x 100-meters relay at World University Games. He ran a 10.12 100 meters, a mark that ranks second best in University of Florida history, behind only Olympic medalist Dennis Mitchell. He won the Southeastern Conference Outdoor 200 m dash title in a Florida record 19.99 (the time ranked as the top American mark and the second fastest time in the world when run). He was named Florida's Most Valuable Track Athlete.

== Professional football career ==
Capel tested positive for marijuana use at the 2001 NFL Combine, and was arrested a few months later for possession of marijuana. He was selected in the seventh round (208th overall) of the 2001 NFL draft by the Chicago Bears, but was released during training camp. He then spent part of training camp in 2002 with the Kansas City Chiefs, but was again released before the season.

== Professional track career ==
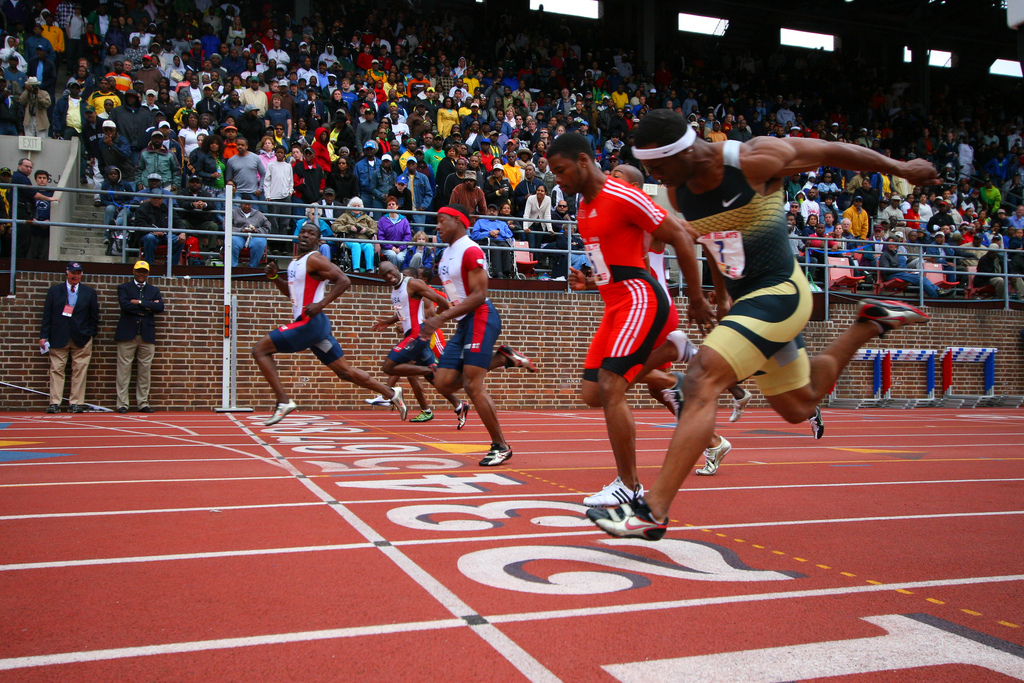
John Capel, winner, at the Penn Relays at Franklin Field, April 26, 2008.

Capel won the 200-meter sprint at the 2000 U.S. Olympic Trials with a personal-best of 19.85 seconds; he finished eighth in the 200-meter final with a time 20.49 at the 2000 Summer Olympics in Sydney, Australia. He finished second in the 200-meter sprint at the NCAA indoor track championships, running the distance in 20.26 seconds and breaking the American indoor record. He finished fourth at the Pontiac Grand Prix Invitational (10.13). He finished second at the Adidas Oregon Track Classic 100 (10.21), third in 200 (20.42). He had bests of 10.12 in a heat at the Olympic Trials and 19.85.

Capel's major athletic highlight came in winning the 200-meter gold medal at the 2003 World Championships, held at the Stade de France in Saint Denis, Paris, France. In August 2005, he won the bronze medal in the 200-meter at the 2005 World Championships.

=== Ban and return to track ===
Capel tested positive in 2004 and then again at the IAAF Norwich Union Indoor Grand Prix in February 2006, that time for a cannabinoid, which resulted in a two-year ban from track. Since his two-year ban for testing positive in 2006, he has become clean, and returned to competition, which he attributes to his then 7-year-old daughter searching for his name online and learning of his past troubles.

In June 2008, Capel traveled to Eugene, Oregon to compete to make the American Men's Olympic Sprint team, which would represent the United States of America in the 2008 Summer Olympics, in Beijing, China. He failed to advance out of the semifinals, but recorded a time of 10.06 seconds: a strong performance after two years away from track competition.

== Life after sports ==
When not competing in track meets, Capel worked for Flagstone Pavers in Brooksville, Florida, driving a forklift and picking defective blocks from outgoing orders. He also served as a coach for track and field and football at his alma mater, Hernando High School in Brooksville, Florida. As of 2013, he was working as an assistant at Oak Hill Hospital. He is married to his high school sweetheart, with whom he has four children.

== Personal bests ==
Event	Date	Venue	Time (seconds)
55 meters	January 18, 2003	Gainesville, Florida, United States	6.03
60 meters	February 15, 2003	Fayetteville, Arkansas, United States	6.48
100 meters	June 19, 2004	Eugene, Oregon, United States	9.95
200 meters	July 23, 2000	Sacramento, California, United States	19.85

- All information from IAAF Profile

As of August 2024, Capel holds three track records for 200 metres including Athens, Georgia, USA (19.99, 1999), Boise, Idaho (19.87, 1999) and Sacramento, California (19.85, 2000).

== See also ==
- Florida Gators
- List of University of Florida Olympians
