= Anson Henry =

Canadian sprinter (born 1979)

Personal information
- Born: March 9, 1979 (age 47) Toronto, Canada

Sport
- Sport: Track and field
Medal record
Representing Canada
Pan American Games
Bronze medal – third place	2003 Santo Domingo	100 m
Silver medal – second place	2007 Rio de Janeiro	4 × 100 m relay
Commonwealth Games
Bronze medal – third place	2006 Melbourne	4 × 100 m relay

Anson Henry (born March 9, 1979) is a retired Canadian sprinter of Jamaican descent who specialized in the 100 metres. He was born in Toronto, Ontario, Canada. His personal best time is 10.12 seconds, achieved in May 2006 in Doha. He also has 20.52 seconds in the 200 metres and 6.59 seconds in the 60 metres.

He blasted onto the track scene when he was the bronze medalist at the 2002 NCAA Indoor Track and Field Championships while representing Washington State University . Henry finished only behind silver medalist Leonard Scott and gold medalist Justin Gatlin who later tested positive for amphetamines. Talk of moving Henry up to the silver medal position went unconcluded. He would later be a favorite at the NCAA Outdoor Track and Field Championships, but due to a muscle cramp in the 100 m final Henry hobbled across the line in an unexpected 8th-place finish. Henry still remains the Washington State University record holder in the 60 m (6.65), 100 m (10.04 w, 10.17) and 200 m (20.52).

At the 2003 Pan American Games he won the bronze medal in the 100 metres, as the original winner Mickey Grimes was stripped of the gold medal after testing positive for ephedrine. At the 2006 Commonwealth Games he finished sixth in the 100 metres and won a bronze medal in the 4 × 100 metres relay. He won a relay silver medal at the 2007 Pan American Games and also finished 7th in the 100 m.

Later on in 2007 Henry would have an impressive 10th-place finish overall in the 100 m dash at the 2007 World Championships in Osaka, Japan. This was the best finish by a Canadian sprinter at any major championships in the 100 m since Bruny Surin won bronze at the 1999 World Championships in Seville, Spain.

He also competed at the 2008 Olympic Games without reaching the final. In Beijing he competed at the 100 metres sprint and placed 4th in his heat behind Francis Obikwelu, Obinna Metu and Walter Dix. He improved his time to 10.33 in the quarter-finals, but failed to qualify to the semi-finals as he finished only in seventh place. Together with Hank Palmer, Pierre Browne and Jared Connaughton he also competed at the 4 × 100 metres relay. In their qualification heat they placed second behind Jamaica, but in front of Germany and China. Their time of 38.77 was the fourth out of sixteen participating nations in the first round and they qualified for the final. There they sprinted to a time of 38.66 seconds, which was the sixth time.

Henry is now a commentator for CBC Sports.

== Early years ==
Anson Henry attended Dunbarton High School. Mainly a basketball player through the majority of his high school years, Henry gave track and field a try in his senior year. He was successful in becoming an OFSAA 100 m Bronze Medalist, and later became the Canadian National Junior Champion in the 100 m dash. He had a personal best in high school of 10.40 s. Later he was 1 of 9 junior athletes selected from Canada to compete at the IAAF World Junior Championships in Athletics in Annecy, France. He finished in 9th place.

== College career ==
Anson Henry received a full athletic scholarship to attend Washington State University. While struggling with injury throughout his early years, which delayed his flourish as a collegiate athlete until his senior year. In that year he set a new WSU 60 m record of 6.65 seconds at the NCAA Indoor Track and Field Championships and had a 3rd-place finish. He would later set the 100 m school record of 10.17 as he won the 2002 Mt. SAC Relays 100 m dash. With the Pac-10 Conference Championships being held at WSU, Henry pulled off the double as he won both the 100 m dash (10.29 s, -1.4 w) and set a new school record in the 200 m Dash of 20.52 s (-0.9 w). He entered the NCAA Outdoor Track and Field Championships as a heavy favorite, and looked great through the qualifying rounds but pulled up mid race with a hamstring cramp, leaving him crossing the line lame in an 8th-place finish. Henry's accomplishments in the year of 2002 awarded him Pac-10 Track and Field Athlete of the Year, and also NCAA Western Region Track and Field Athlete of the Year. Henry still remains the only sprinter at WSU to be both an Indoor and Outdoor All-American.
