= Joshua J. Johnson =

American sprinter (born 1976)

Personal information
- Nationality: American
- Born: May 10, 1976 (age 50) Dallas, Texas, U.S.
- Height: 6 ft 3 in (1.91 m)
- Weight: 210 lb (95 kg)

Sport
- Sport: Running
- Events: 100 metres, 200 metres
- College team: Oklahoma Panhandle State University
Medal record
Men's Athletics
Representing the United States
World Championships
| Gold medal – first place | 2003 Paris | 4 × 100 m relay |

Joshua J. Johnson (born May 10, 1976) is an American sprinter who specialized in the 200 metres. Johnson is a world champion in the 4 × 100 m relay.

== Achievements ==
| Year | Tournament | Venue | Result | Extra |
|---|---|---|---|---|
| 2003 | World Championships | Paris, France | 6th | 200 m |
| 2003 | World Athletics Final | Monte Carlo, Monaco | 1st | 200 m |
| 2004 | World Athletics Final | Monte Carlo, Monaco | 7th | 100 m |
| 2004 | World Athletics Final | Monte Carlo, Monaco | 5th | 200 m |

=== Personal bests ===
- 100 metres - 9.95 s (2002)
- 200 metres - 19.88 s (2001)

Sporting positions
| Preceded by (United States) Michael Johnson | Men's 200 m Best Year Performance; 2001 | Succeeded by (United States) Shawn Crawford |
