= Tommi Hartonen =

Finnish sprinter (born 1977)

Tommi Mikael Hartonen (born May 12, 1977 in Helsinki) is a retired Finnish sprinter. He used to hold the Finnish national records at men's 100 m and 200 m. He won national championship in 100m run four times, 2000, 2001, 2002 and 2004. He also was 400m champion once. His personal trainer was Markus Hartonen. He is nicknamed Suomen nopein.

== Progression ==
=== 100m ===
Year	Time	Wind	City	Date
1998	11.09	+0.2	Tampere	2 June 1998
1999	10.74	+0.9	Raahe	14 August 1999
2000	10.27	+2.0	Lapinlahti	16 July 2000
2001	10.21 (NR)	+0.5	Vaasa	23 June 2001
2002	10.35	-0.1	Stockholm, Sweden	16 July 2002
2003	10.31	+0.3	Turku	15 June 2003
2004	10.45	-0.6	Turku	9 June 2004
2005	10.41	+1.2	Kuortane	26 June 2005
2006	10.60	+1.5	Turku	26 June 2006
2008	10.77	+0.8	Lempäälä	10 July 2008

=== 200 m ===
Year	Time	Wind	City	Date
1994	21.71	-0.5	Tuusula	10 July 1994
1995	21.57	-0.3	Helsinki	27 August 1995
1996	21.54	+0.2	Parkano	20 June 1996
1997	21.57	+1.9	Lohja	17 August 1997
1998	21.87	+0.1	Turku	1 July 1998
1999	21.31	+1.7	Raahe	15 August 1999
2000	20.47 (NR)	-0.2	Sydney, Australia	27 September 2000
2001	20.57	+1.1	Edmonton, Canada	7 August 2001
2002	20.77	+0.0	Lappeenranta	18 August 2002
2003	20.84	-0.1	Helsinki	6 September 2003
2004	20.98	-0.2	Tallinn, Estonia	21 July 2004
2005	20.59	+1.8	Helsinki	9 August 2005
2006	21.22	+1.8	Gothenburg, Sweden	9 August 2006
2008	21.48	-1.3	Helsinki/E	8 July 2008

== Personal bests ==
- 60 m (indoor): 6.71 in Turku, 2005
- 100 m: 10.21 in Vaasa, 2001
- 200 m: 20.47 in Sydney, 2000
- 400 m: 47.22 in Helsinki, 1997

== Physical characteristics ==
- Height: 189 cm (6'2"ft)
- Weight: 85 kg (187lbs)
