= Marco Torrieri =

Italian sprinter (born 1978)

Personal information
- Nationality: Italian
- Born: 14 May 1978 (age 48) Monterotondo, Italy
- Height: 1.80 m (5 ft 11 in)
- Weight: 80 kg (176 lb)

Sport
- Country: Italy
- Sport: Athletics
- Event: Sprint

Achievements and titles
- Personal bests: 60 m: 6.74 (2008); 100 m: 10.22 (2002); 200 m: 20.38 (2001); 200 m indoor: 20.78 (2003)
Medal record
Mediterranean Games
Gold medal – first place	2001 Tunis	4 × 100 metres relay
Gold medal – first place	2005 Almeria	4 × 100 metres relay
Bronze medal – third place	2005 Almeria	100 metres

Marco Torrieri (born 14 May 1978) is an Italian sprinter specializing in 200 metres.

== Biography ==
He finished sixth at the 2002 European Championships in Munich and fifth at the 2003 IAAF World Indoor Championships in Birmingham. At the 2001 Mediterranean Games he finished fourth over 200 m and won a gold medal in 4 × 100 m relay. At the 2005 Mediterranean Games he won a bronze medal in the 100 metres race.

His personal best time is 20.38 seconds, achieved in the semi-final at the 2001 World Championships in Edmonton.

== National titles ==
He won 3 national championships at individual senior level.

- Italian Athletics Championships
  - 200 metres: 2001
- Italian Indoor Athletics Championships
  - 200 metres: 2000, 2003

== See also ==
- Italian all-time lists - 100 metres
- Italian all-time lists - 200 metres
- Italy national relay team
