= Nicolas Macrozonaris =

Canadian sprinter

Personal information
- Born: August 22, 1980 (age 45) Laval, Quebec, Canada

Sport
- Sport: Running, Track and Field
- Event: Sprints
- Team: Reebok

Achievements and titles
- Personal best(s): 50m: 5.69s (Saskatoon 2002); 60m: 6.56s (Montreal 2002); 100m: 10.03s (Mexico City 2003); 200m: 20.85s (Victoria 2003)
Medal record
Men's athletics
Representing Canada
Canadian Track and Field Championships
| Silver medal – second place | 2001 Edmonton | 100 m |
| Gold medal – first place | 2002 Edmonton | 100 m |
| Gold medal – first place | 2003 Victoria | 100 m |
| Gold medal – first place | 2003 Victoria | 200 m |
| Silver medal – second place | 2004 Victoria | 100 m |
| Bronze medal – third place | 2005 Winnipeg | 100 m |
| Gold medal – first place | 2006 Ottawa | 100 m |
| Gold medal – first place | 2007 Windsor | 100 m |
2000 NACAC Under-25 Championships in Athletics
| Silver medal – second place | 2000 Monterrey, Mexico | 100 m |

Nicolas Macrozonaris (Greek: Νικόλαος Μακροζωνάρης, born August 22, 1980) is a Canadian Olympic track and field athlete of Greek descent, who has won the 100 metre national title four times and once in the 200 metre.

== Career ==
He was inspired to run track and field after watching Donovan Bailey win the 100 metres at the 1996 Summer Olympics in Atlanta. After watching that race, it motivated him to take the sport seriously. A few years later, as a junior, he tied Ben Johnson's Canadian national record in the 50 metre sprint, running a time of 5.83. The following year, after 4 years of intensive training, he qualified for the 2000 Sydney Olympics' 100 meter event at the age of 19. At the Olympics, he ran a time of 10.45 to finish 42nd overall out of 95, being eliminated in the heats.

His culminating moment as a sprinter came on May 3, 2003 when he ran a time of 10.03 seconds and beat the then world record holder, American Tim Montgomery in Mexico City. That race catapulted Macrozonaris globally on the eve of the Athens Olympic Games, where he would be well received by local fans given his Hellenic heritage.

In the summer of 2004, he qualified for the 2004 Summer Olympics in Athens and finished 28th out of 80 in the 100 meter event, thus improving his position from his previous Olympic Games in Sydney where he finished 42nd.

As of 2019, his personal best time of 10.03 in the 100m is still ranked the sixth fastest Canadian 100m time, behind Bruny Surin and Donovan Bailey who both share the national record with a 9.84 clocking, along with Andre De Grasse (9.90), Aaron Brown (9.96) and Gavin Smellie (10.01).

Nicolas has represented Canada in many international competitions and has qualified for six World Championships, three Francophone Games, two Olympic Games, two Commonwealth games, one World Cup, and one Pan American Championship.

In 2017, he ran for the Action Laval party in the 2017 Laval municipal election, but finished third in the Sainte-Dorothée District.

In 2024, Nicolas was hired as the sprints coach for the Concordia University Stingers Track & Field Team.

== Statistics ==
=== Personal bests ===
| Event | Best | Location | Date |
|---|---|---|---|
| 50 metres | 5.69s | Saskatoon SK Canada | 12 January 2002 |
| 60 metres | 6.56s | Montreal, QC Canada | 14 December 2002 |
| 100 metres | 10.03s | Mexico City | 3 May 2003 |
| 200 metres | 20.85s | Victoria, BC Canada | 20 July 2003 |
