= Matthew Quinn (sprinter) =

South African sprinter (born 1976)

Personal information
- Born: 17 April 1976 (age 50) Salisbury, Rhodesia
Medal record
Men's athletics
Representing South Africa
World Championships
Gold medal – first place	2001 Edmonton	4×100 m relay
Universiade
Silver medal – second place	1999 Palma de Mallorca	4x100 m relay
Bronze medal – third place	1999 Palma de Mallorca	100 metres

Matthew Quinn (born 17 April 1976) is a South African former sprinter. Together with Morné Nagel, Corné du Plessis and Lee-Roy Newton he won a gold medal in 4 × 100 metres relay at the 2001 World Championships in Athletics.

Following the ruling of 13 December 2005 which retroactively disqualified Tim Montgomery and henceforth the American team, the South African team were promoted to gold medallists.

He is married to former sprinter Heide Seyerling.

== Personal bests ==
- 100 metres – 10.08 (1999)
- 200 metres – 20.93 (1999)
