= Lee-Roy Newton =

South African sprinter (born 1978)

Personal information
- Born: 19 December 1978 (age 47) Durban, South Africa

Sport
- Sport: Track and field
Medal record
Representing South Africa
World Championships
Gold medal – first place	2001 Edmonton	4×100 m relay
African Championships
Silver medal – second place	2004 Brazzaville	4×100 m relay
Silver medal – second place	2006 Bambous	4×100 m relay
Commonwealth Games
Silver medal – second place	2006 Melbourne	4×100 m relay
Summer Universiade
Silver medal – second place	1999 Palma de Mallorca	4x100 m relay

Lee-Roy Newton (born 19 December 1978) is a South African sprinter. Together with Morné Nagel, Corné du Plessis and Matthew Quinn he won a silver medal in 4 × 100 metres relay at the 2001 World Championships in Athletics.

Following the ruling of 13 December 2005 which retroactively disqualified Tim Montgomery and henceforth the American team, the South African team were promoted to gold medallists.

At the 2006 Commonwealth Games in Melbourne, Newton won a silver medal with the South African team in the 4 × 100 metres relay.

In February 2007 Newton clocked 9.95 seconds in the 100 meters at the KwaZulu-Natal Athletics senior provincial track and field championships in Durban, narrowly beating teammate and training partner Dean Wicks, who clocked 10.00 seconds. In doing so, Newton would have become one of only 50 men to have broken the 10 second barrier in the 100 m. Even Linda Ferns, CEO of Athletics SA, said the application to recognise Newton's time in Durban would be studied. "We will have to look at all the technical details and must ensure that a test for performance enhancers was done.".

On 13 February, the time was disqualified for three reasons: 1) Lee-Roy's reaction time of -0.046 seconds is considered too fast by IAAF rules, and therefore indicates he false started, 2) the finish line camera was not properly aligned with the finish line, possible by much as a meter, 3) he was not escorted to drug testing at the stadium, and rather was tested much later at his residence.

Newton is an agent for track and field athletes, especially in Ethiopia, Kenya, and South Africa.

== Personal bests ==
- 100 metres – 10.27 (2000); [9.95 (2007) unratified mark]
- 200 metres – 20.75 (2000 & 2001)
- 400 metres – 47.89 (2002)
