= Paul Di Bella =

Australian sprinter (born 1977)

Personal information
- Nationality: Australia
- Born: 12 February 1977 (age 49) Ingham, Queensland, Australia

Sport
- Sport: Track and field
Medal record
Representing Australia
Commonwealth Games
Bronze medal – third place	2002 Manchester	4×100 m relay
World Championships
Bronze medal – third place	2001 Edmonton	4x100 m relay

Paul Joseph Anthony Di Bella (born 12 February 1977) is an Australian sprinter, who competed for his nation as part of the Australian Men's 4 × 100 metres relay team at the 2000 Summer Olympics and the team at the 2004 Summer Olympics.
