= Marcin Jędrusiński =

Polish sprinter (born 1981)

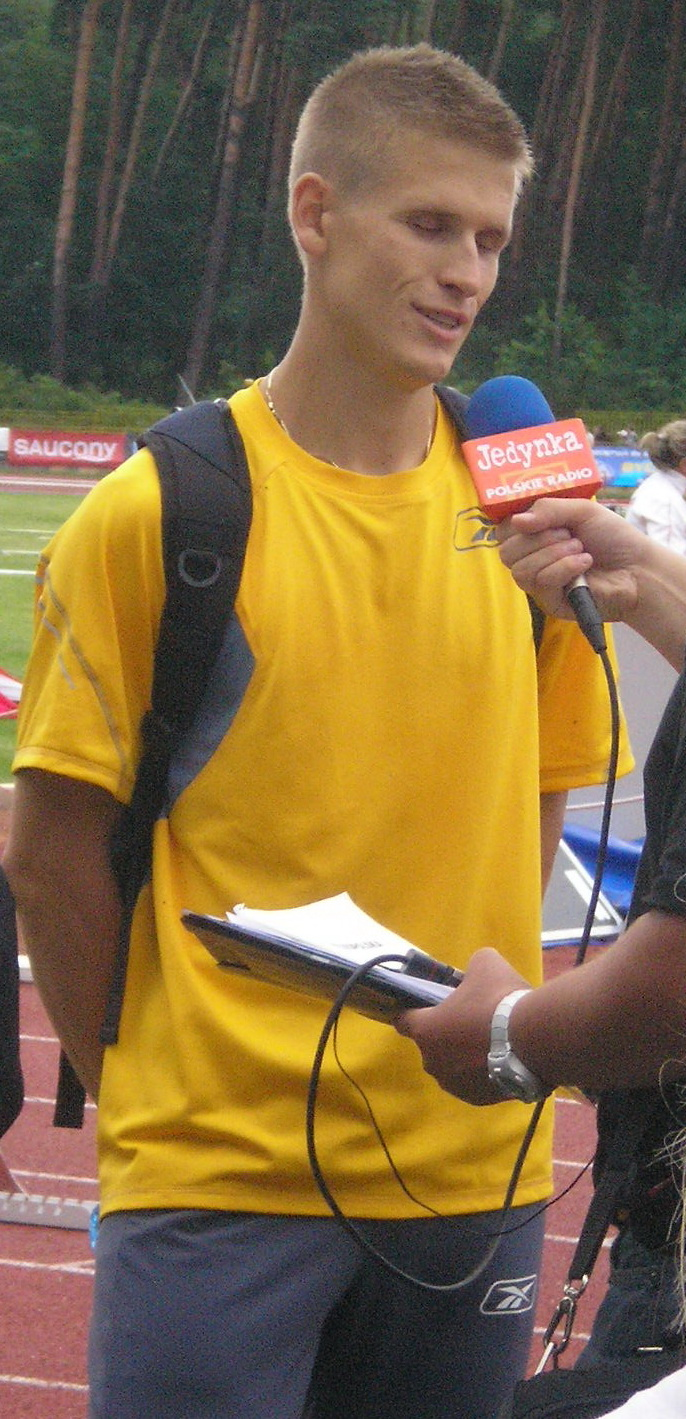

Personal information
- Nationality: Poland
- Born: 28 September 1981 (age 44) Wrocław
- Height: 1.88 m (6 ft 2 in)
- Weight: 74 kg (163 lb)

Sport
- Sport: Running
- Event(s): 100 metres, 200 metres

Achievements and titles
- Personal best(s): 100 m: 10.26 s (Chorzów 2008); 200 m: 20.31 s (Osaka 2007)
Medal record
European Championships
Silver medal – second place	2006 Gothenburg	4 × 100 m relay
Military World Games
Gold medal – first place	1999 Zagreb	4 × 400 m relay
Gold medal – first place	2007 Hyderabad	200 m
Silver medal – second place	2007 Hyderabad	4 × 100 m relay

Marcin Jędrusiński [mart͡ɕin jɛndruˈɕiɲski] (born 28 September 1981) is a Polish former sprint athlete.

Jędrusiński represented Poland at the 2008 Summer Olympics in Beijing and the 2004 Olympics in Athens. He competed at the 4 × 100 metres relay together with Dariusz Kuc, Lukasz Chyla and Marcin Andrzej Nowak. In their qualification heat they did not finish due to a mistake in the baton exchange and they were eliminated. At the individual 200 metres he qualified second in his first round heat behind Shawn Crawford in a time of 20.64 seconds. He improved his time in the second round to 20.58 seconds, but only finished fourth behind Brendan Christian, Churandy Martina and Kristof Beyens. His time was not enough to advance to the semi-finals.

== Achievements ==
- European Championships
  - 2nd (silver medal) in 2006 - 4 × 100 m (39.05)
- European Cup
  - 3rd in 2001 – 4 × 100 m (39.00)
  - 3rd in 2003 – 200 m (20.53)
  - 2nd in 2003 – 4 × 100 m (38.45)
  - 2nd in 2004 – 4 × 100 m (38.68)
  - 1st in 2006 – 4 × 100 m (39.07)
  - 2nd in 2008 - 4 × 100 m (38.61)
- European Youth Championships
  - 1st (gold medal) in 2001 – 200 m (20.94)
  - 2nd (silver medal) in 2003 – 200 m (20.39)
- World Junior Championships
  - 2nd (silver medal) in 2000 – 200 m (20.87)
- European Junior Championships
  - 2nd in 1999 – 4 × 100 m (39.67)
- Military World Games
  - 1st in 1999 – 4 × 400 m (3:02.78)
  - 1st in 2007 – 200 m (20.70)
  - 2nd in 2007 - 4 × 100 m (39.52)
