= Morné Nagel =

South African sprinter (born 1978)

Personal information
- Born: 23 February 1978 (age 48) Johannesburg, South Africa

Sport
- Sport: Track and field
Medal record
Representing South Africa
World Championships
Gold medal – first place	2001 Edmonton	4×100 m relay
African Games
Silver medal – second place	2007 Algiers	4x100 m relay
Bronze medal – third place	1999 Johannesburg	4x100 m relay
African Championships
Silver medal – second place	2004 Brazzaville	4×100 m relay
Bronze medal – third place	2004 Brazzaville	200 m
Summer Universiade
Silver medal – second place	1999 Palma de Mallorca	4x100 m relay

Morné Nagel (born 23 February 1978) is a South African sprinter. Together with Corné du Plessis, Lee-Roy Newton and Mathew Quinn he won a gold medal in 4 × 100 metres relay at the 2001 World Championships in Athletics.

Following the ruling of 13 December 2005 which retroactively disqualified Tim Montgomery and henceforth the American team, the South African team were promoted to gold medallists. Morne Nagel is tied for being the second fastest man in African history with his 6.48 60 meter dash, behind Leonard Myles-Mills' 6.45. He was ranked the fastest 60 meter in the world in 2002 according to the IAAF.

After a successful career Morne shifted his focus to coaching. This includes athletics, strength & conditioning and sport specific performance.

He is affiliated with the athletics & sport science program of the University of Johannesburg. Morne is also the managing director for SCF-Nutrition Pty Ltd. www.scfnutrition.com

== Personal bests ==
- 60 metres – 6.48 (2002) NR
- 100 metres – 10.13 (2002, 2003)
- 200 metres – 20.11 (2003) NR
- 300 metres – 32.14 (2006) NR
- 400 metres – 46.92 (2008)
