= 1996 World Junior Championships in Athletics – Men's 100 metres =

The men's 100 metres event at the 1996 World Junior Championships in Athletics was held in Sydney, Australia, at International Athletic Centre on 21 and 22 August.

== Medalists ==
Gold	Francis Obikwelu; Nigeria
Silver	Seun Ogunkoya; Nigeria
Bronze	Francesco Scuderi; Italy

== Results ==
=== Final ===
22 August
Wind: +1.0 m/s

Rank	Name	Nationality	Time	Notes
1st place, gold medalist(s)	Francis Obikwelu	Nigeria	10.21	
2nd place, silver medalist(s)	Seun Ogunkoya	Nigeria	10.25	
3rd place, bronze medalist(s)	Francesco Scuderi	Italy	10.43	
4	Jamie Henthorn	United Kingdom	10.45	
5	Dwain Chambers	United Kingdom	10.47	
6	Lawrence Armstrong	United States	10.48	
7	Lindel Frater	Jamaica	10.52	
8	Dean Wise	New Zealand	10.59	

=== Semifinals ===
22 August

==== Semifinal 1 ====
Wind: -0.5 m/s

Rank	Name	Nationality	Time	Notes
1	Seun Ogunkoya	Nigeria	10.35	Q
2	Dwain Chambers	United Kingdom	10.48	Q
3	Lindel Frater	Jamaica	10.52	Q
4	Lawrence Armstrong	United States	10.57	Q
5	José Illán	Spain	10.61	
6	Georgios Skender	Cyprus	10.71	
7	Paul Pearce	Australia	10.75	
8	Marcus La Grange	South Africa	10.79	

==== Semifinal 2 ====
Wind: +1.6 m/s

Rank	Name	Nationality	Time	Notes
1	Francis Obikwelu	Nigeria	10.31	Q
2	Jamie Henthorn	United Kingdom	10.48	Q
3	Francesco Scuderi	Italy	10.50	Q
4	Dean Wise	New Zealand	10.54	Q
5	Paulo Poersch	Brazil	10.58	
6	Vince Williams	United States	10.59	
7	Christofer Ohlsson	Sweden	10.66	
8	Erik Kringeland	Norway	10.99	

=== Quarterfinals ===
21 August

==== Quarterfinal 1 ====
Wind: -2.2 m/s

Rank	Name	Nationality	Time	Notes
1	Seun Ogunkoya	Nigeria	10.54	Q
2	Lawrence Armstrong	United States	10.84	Q
3	Christofer Ohlsson	Sweden	10.86	Q
4	Erik Kringeland	Norway	10.90	Q
5	Dominic Demeritte	Bahamas	10.91	
6	László Babály	Hungary	11.04	
7	Charles Allen	Canada	11.13	
	Ioánnis Paraschópoulos	Greece	DNF	

==== Quarterfinal 2 ====
Wind: -2.5 m/s

Rank	Name	Nationality	Time	Notes
1	Dwain Chambers	United Kingdom	10.80	Q
2	Paulo Poersch	Brazil	10.81	Q
3	Paul Pearce	Australia	10.87	Q
4	Marcus La Grange	South Africa	10.92	Q
5	Jens Weissbach	Germany	10.98	
6	Benedictus Botha	Namibia	10.99	
7	Misael Ortíz	Cuba	11.12	
8	Joseph Colville	Costa Rica	11.13	

==== Quarterfinal 3 ====
Wind: -1.5 m/s

Rank	Name	Nationality	Time	Notes
1	Francis Obikwelu	Nigeria	10.69	Q
2	Jamie Henthorn	United Kingdom	10.75	Q
3	Vince Williams	United States	10.86	Q
4	Francesco Scuderi	Italy	10.86	Q
5	Shingo Kawabata	Japan	10.88	
6	Oscar Meneses	Guatemala	10.94	
7	David Patros	France	10.97	
8	Stéphane Buckland	Mauritius	11.13	

==== Quarterfinal 4 ====
Wind: -1.3 m/s

Rank	Name	Nationality	Time	Notes
1	Dean Wise	New Zealand	10.66	Q
2	Lindel Frater	Jamaica	10.73	Q
3	Georgios Skender	Cyprus	10.74	Q
4	José Illán	Spain	10.82	Q
5	Vitaliy Medvedev	Kazakhstan	10.88	
6	David Baxter	Australia	10.91	
7	Henrik Grönqvist	Finland	10.99	
8	Omar Sacco	Italy	11.10	

=== Heats ===
21 August

==== Heat 1 ====
Wind: +0.9 m/s

Rank	Name	Nationality	Time	Notes
1	Francis Obikwelu	Nigeria	10.53	Q
2	David Patros	France	10.61	Q
3	José Illán	Spain	10.67	Q
4	Dominic Demeritte	Bahamas	10.76	Q
5	Hristóforos Hoídis	Greece	10.76	
6	Vegard Hollås	Norway	10.82	
7	Shane Brown	Jamaica	10.84	
8	Jeffrey Bai	Papua New Guinea	11.33	

==== Heat 2 ====
Wind: -1.7 m/s

Rank	Name	Nationality	Time	Notes
1	Paulo Poersch	Brazil	10.58	Q
2	Dwain Chambers	United Kingdom	10.62	Q
3	Jens Weissbach	Germany	10.81	Q
4	Vince Williams	United States	10.82	Q
5	Takashi Miyata	Japan	10.83	
6	Julio César Roque	El Salvador	11.03	
7	Adam Afrah	Maldives	12.00	

==== Heat 3 ====
Wind: -0.6 m/s

Rank	Name	Nationality	Time	Notes
1	Dean Wise	New Zealand	10.63	Q
2	Francesco Scuderi	Italy	10.72	Q
3	Misael Ortíz	Cuba	10.74	Q
4	Joseph Colville	Costa Rica	11.00	Q
5	Frantz Valbona	Haiti	11.16	
6	Felimon Pasante	Philippines	11.49	
7	Eduard Martin	Germany	12.47	

==== Heat 4 ====
Wind: +0.1 m/s

Rank	Name	Nationality	Time	Notes
1	Jamie Henthorn	United Kingdom	10.61	Q
2	Marcus La Grange	South Africa	10.68	Q
3	Oscar Meneses	Guatemala	10.72	Q
4	Omar Sacco	Italy	10.79	Q
5	William To Wai Lok	Hong Kong	10.91	
6	Orkatz Beitia	Spain	10.95	
7	Valentin Borsuk	Belarus	11.05	

==== Heat 5 ====
Wind: +1.4 m/s

Rank	Name	Nationality	Time	Notes
1	Seun Ogunkoya	Nigeria	10.44	Q
2	Christofer Ohlsson	Sweden	10.54	Q
3	Erik Kringeland	Norway	10.62	Q
4	László Babály	Hungary	10.67	Q
5	Stéphane Buckland	Mauritius	10.68	q
6	Kok Lim Tan	Malaysia	10.79	

==== Heat 6 ====
Wind: +0.5 m/s

Rank	Name	Nationality	Time	Notes
1	Paul Pearce	Australia	10.55	Q
2	Georgios Skender	Cyprus	10.58	Q
3	Charles Allen	Canada	10.62	Q
4	Lindel Frater	Jamaica	10.65	Q
5	Benedictus Botha	Namibia	10.67	q
6	Ioánnis Paraschópoulos	Greece	10.74	q
7	Kamarudizaman Abu Bakar	Malaysia	10.87	
8	Boonyarit Phuksachat	Thailand	10.88	

==== Heat 7 ====
Wind: +0.5 m/s

Rank	Name	Nationality	Time	Notes
1	David Baxter	Australia	10.52	Q
2	Lawrence Armstrong	United States	10.56	Q
3	Vitaliy Medvedev	Kazakhstan	10.60	Q
4	Shingo Kawabata	Japan	10.64	Q
5	Henrik Grönqvist	Finland	10.74	q
6	Malik Louahla	Algeria	10.82	
7	Vincent Caure	France	10.85	
8	Ekkachai Janthana	Thailand	10.96	

== Participation ==
According to an unofficial count, 51 athletes from 37 countries participated in the event.

- Algeria (1)
- Australia (2)
- Bahamas (1)
- Belarus (1)
- Brazil (1)
- Canada (1)
- Costa Rica (1)
- Cuba (1)
- Cyprus (1)
- El Salvador (1)
- Finland (1)
- France (2)
- Germany (2)
- Greece (2)
- Guatemala (1)
- Haiti (1)
- Hong Kong (1)
- Hungary (1)
- Italy (2)
- Jamaica (2)
- Japan (2)
- Kazakhstan (1)
- Malaysia (2)
- Maldives (1)
- Mauritius (1)
- Namibia (1)
- New Zealand (1)
- Nigeria (2)
- Norway (2)
- Papua New Guinea (1)
- Philippines (1)
- South Africa (1)
- Spain (2)
- Sweden (1)
- Thailand (2)
- United Kingdom (2)
- United States (2)
