= 1996 World Junior Championships in Athletics – Men's 4 × 100 metres relay =

Competition in Sydney, Australia

The men's 4×100 metres relay event at the 1996 World Junior Championships in Athletics was held in Sydney, Australia, at International Athletic Centre on 25 August.

== Medalists ==
Gold	Vince Williams; Jerome Davis; Obea Moore; Lawrence Armstrong; United States
Silver	Vincent Caure; Didier Héry; Ruddy Zami; David Patros; France
Bronze	Peter Missingham; David Baxter; Paul Pearce; Paul Di Bella; Australia

== Results ==
=== Final ===
25 August

Rank	Nation	Competitors	Time	Notes
1st place, gold medalist(s)	United States	Vince Williams; Jerome Davis; Obea Moore; Lawrence Armstrong	39.36	
2nd place, silver medalist(s)	France	Vincent Caure; Didier Héry; Ruddy Zami; David Patros	39.47	
3rd place, bronze medalist(s)	Australia	Peter Missingham; David Baxter; Paul Pearce; Paul Di Bella	39.62	
4	Germany	Marc-Oliver Schmidtchen; Jens Weissbach; Patrick Weimer; Jerome Crews	39.67	
5	Japan	Yasuhide Nishikawa; Masayuki Okusako; Takashi Miyata; Shingo Kawabata	39.75	
6	Italy	Omar Sacco; Alessandro Attene; Michele Paggi; Francesco Scuderi	40.18	
7	United Kingdom	Christian Malcolm; Jamie Henthorn; Uvie Ugono; Dwain Chambers	40.32	
	New Zealand	Donald MacDonald; Michael O'Connor; Corey Chase; Dean Wise	DNF	

=== Heats ===
25 August

==== Heat 1 ====
Rank	Nation	Competitors	Time	Notes
1	Japan	Yasuhide Nishikawa; Masayuki Okusako; Takashi Miyata; Shingo Kawabata	39.78	Q
2	Australia	Jason Snell; David Baxter; Paul Pearce; Paul Di Bella	39.85	Q
3	United Kingdom	Christian Malcolm; Jamie Henthorn; Uvie Ugono; Dwain Chambers	39.98	q
4	South Africa	Llewellyn Herbert; Marcus La Grange; Chris Jacobs; Riaan Dempers	40.54	
5	Finland	Teemu Tapper; Kim Meller; Henrik Grönqvist; Tommi Hartonen	40.96	

==== Heat 2 ====
Rank	Nation	Competitors	Time	Notes
1	France	Vincent Caure; Didier Héry; Ruddy Zami; David Patros	39.72	Q
2	United States	Vince Williams; Jerome Davis; Obea Moore; Lawrence Armstrong	39.77	Q
3	Cuba	Joan Lino Martínez; Misael Ortíz; Grabiel González; Carlos Patterson	40.31	
4	Jamaica	Roy Bailey; Shane Brown; Lindel Frater; David Spencer	40.46	
5	Thailand	Wanchai Prasatsilapapong; Ekkachai Janthana; Boonyarit Phuksachat; Narong Charoenpoel	40.96	
6	Malaysia	Hamberi bin Mahat; Kamarudizaman Abu Bakar; Kok Lim Tan; Raman Ganeshwaran	41.17	

==== Heat 3 ====
Rank	Nation	Competitors	Time	Notes
1	Germany	Marc-Oliver Schmidtchen; Jens Weissbach; Patrick Weimer; Jerome Crews	39.68	Q
2	New Zealand	Donald MacDonald; Michael O'Connor; Corey Chase; Dean Wise	40.11	Q
3	Italy	Omar Sacco; Alessandro Attene; Michele Paggi; Francesco Scuderi	40.12	q
4	Namibia	Willie Smith; Christie van Wyk; Thobias Akwenye; Benedictus Botha	40.84	
5	Spain	Orkatz Beitia; José Illán; Diego Santos; Carlos Muñiz	41.04	
	Greece	Evággelos Asaryiotákis; Konstadínos Voyiatzákis; Nikólaos Grigorópoulos; Hristóforos Hoídis	DQ	

== Participation ==
According to an unofficial count, 69 athletes from 17 countries participated in the event.

- Australia (5)
- Cuba (4)
- Finland (4)
- France (4)
- Germany (4)
- Greece (4)
- Italy (4)
- Jamaica (4)
- Japan (4)
- Malaysia (4)
- Namibia (4)
- New Zealand (4)
- South Africa (4)
- Spain (4)
- Thailand (4)
- United Kingdom (4)
- United States (4)
