= Athletics at the 1999 Summer Universiade – Men's 200 metres =

The men's 200 metres event at the 1999 Summer Universiade was held at the Estadio Son Moix in Palma de Mallorca, Spain on 8 and 9 July.

== Medalists ==
| Gold | Silver | Bronze |
|---|---|---|
| Coby Miller; United States | Patrick van Balkom; Netherlands | Christos Magos; Greece |

== Results ==
=== Heats ===
Wind:
Heat 1: -2.1 m/s, Heat 2: -4.5 m/s, Heat 3: -1.8 m/s, Heat 4: -1.8 m/s, Heat 5: +0.1 m/s, Heat 6: -1.4 m/s, Heat 7: -2.9 m/s, Heat 8: -1.9 m/s

| Rank | Heat | Athlete | Nationality | Time | Notes |
|---|---|---|---|---|---|
| 1 | 5 | Gary Ryan | Ireland | 20.88 | Q |
| 2 | 1 | Roland Németh | Hungary | 20.94 | Q |
| 3 | 1 | Patrick van Balkom | Netherlands | 21.03 | Q |
| 4 | 5 | Marc Foucan | France | 21.06 | Q |
| 4 | 6 | Coby Miller | United States | 21.06 | Q |
| 6 | 8 | Panagiotis Sarris | Greece | 21.08 | Q |
| 7 | 2 | Christopher Williams | Jamaica | 21.10 | Q |
| 8 | 8 | Torbjörn Eriksson | Sweden | 21.13 | Q |
| 9 | 1 | Glenn Smith | Canada | 21.20 | Q |
| 10 | 8 | Juan Pedro Toledo | Mexico | 21.21 | Q |
| 11 | 1 | Andrea Colombo | Italy | 21.25 | q |
| 12 | 3 | Ricardo Roach | Chile | 21.27 | Q |
| 13 | 5 | Alessandro Attene | Italy | 21.31 | q |
| 14 | 8 | Denis Nikolayev | Russia | 21.37 | q |
| 15 | 7 | Hirofumi Nakagawa | Japan | 21.39 | Q |
| 16 | 2 | Patrick Johnson | Australia | 21.40 | Q |
| 16 | 6 | Christos Magos | Greece | 21.40 | Q |
| 18 | 4 | John Stewart | Great Britain | 21.45 | Q |
| 19 | 3 | Christie van Wyk | Namibia | 21.46 | Q |
| 20 | 7 | Malik Louahla | Algeria | 21.52 | Q |
| 21 | 2 | Sean Baldock | Great Britain | 21.55 | Q |
| 22 | 7 | Alpha Babacar Sall | Senegal | 21.57 | Q |
| 23 | 4 | Olatunji Olayemi | Nigeria | 21.60 | Q |
| 24 | 7 | Ambrose Ezenwa | Nigeria | 21.60 | q |
| 25 | 4 | Janne Hautaniemi | Finland | 21.63 | Q |
| 26 | 2 | Lee Roy Newton | South Africa | 21.65 | q |
| 27 | 6 | Tadashi Imori | Japan | 21.66 | Q |
| 28 | 4 | Boštjan Horvat | Slovenia | 21.69 | q |
| 28 | 8 | Vitor Jorge | Portugal | 21.69 | q |
| 30 | 5 | Israel Núñez | Spain | 21.71 | q |
| 31 | 2 | Tommy Kafri | Israel | 21.72 | q |
| 32 | 1 | Morné Nagel | South Africa | 21.77 | |
| 33 | 4 | Christoph Kempen | Netherlands | 21.78 | |
| 34 | 6 | Rodrigo Roach | Chile | 21.84 | |
| 35 | 6 | Aleksandr Ryabov | Russia | 21.87 | |
| 36 | 7 | Mikael Ahl | Sweden | 21.90 | |
| 37 | 2 | Ángel Antonio García | Spain | 21.94 | |
| 38 | 7 | Justice Dipeba | Botswana | 21.95 | |
| 39 | 4 | Mathew Coad | New Zealand | 21.96 | |
| 40 | 1 | Nazmizan Muhammad | Malaysia | 22.04 | |
| 41 | 3 | Russell Brooks | Canada | 22.08 | Q |
| 42 | 3 | Bryan Howard | United States | 22.12 | |
| 43 | 8 | Aleksandrs Titovs | Latvia | 22.34 | |
| 44 | 2 | Khristo Gadzhov | Bulgaria | 22.35 | |
| 45 | 4 | Ivo Signer | Switzerland | 22.38 | |
| 46 | 6 | Zakaria Messaiké | Lebanon | 22.39 | |
| 47 | 5 | Leung Chun Kit | Hong Kong | 22.40 | |
| 48 | 7 | Daniel Dubois | Switzerland | 22.40 | |
| 49 | 3 | Ho Kwan Lung | Hong Kong | 22.55 | |
| 50 | 3 | Joseph Tomusange | Uganda | 22.55 | |
| 51 | 1 | Christian Mbarga | Cameroon | 22.64 | |
| 52 | 1 | Kebaitse Legojane | Botswana | 22.76 | |
| 53 | 8 | Kamarudizaman Abu Bakar | Malaysia | 22.87 | |
| 54 | 5 | Lei Pak Lim | Macau | 23.01 | |
| 55 | 6 | Christian Carranza | Costa Rica | 23.53 | |
| 56 | 8 | Lei Ka In | Macau | 23.76 | |
| | 2 | Steven Jones | British Virgin Islands | DQ | R141.2 |
| | 3 | Cláudio Roberto Souza | Brazil | DQ | R141.2 |
| | 4 | Christian Birk | Denmark | DQ | |
| | 3 | El Hadj Hamadou | Guinea | DNS | |
| | 5 | Stephen Gruppetta | Malta | DNS | |
| | 5 | Petko Petrov | Bulgaria | DNS | |
| | 7 | Lawary Bah Hamadu | Guinea | DNS | |

=== Quarterfinals ===
Wind:
Heat 1: +1.4 m/s, Heat 2: +0.8 m/s, Heat 3: +2.5 m/s, Heat 4: +1.7 m/s

| Rank | Heat | Athlete | Nationality | Time | Notes |
|---|---|---|---|---|---|
| 1 | 1 | Coby Miller | United States | 20.43 | Q |
| 2 | 4 | Christopher Williams | Jamaica | 20.56 | Q |
| 3 | 2 | Roland Németh | Hungary | 20.62 | Q |
| 4 | 1 | Ricardo Roach | Chile | 20.76 | Q |
| 4 | 4 | Patrick Johnson | Australia | 20.76 | Q |
| 6 | 1 | Torbjörn Eriksson | Sweden | 20.77 | Q |
| 7 | 3 | Patrick van Balkom | Netherlands | 20.78w | Q |
| 7 | 1 | Christos Magos | Greece | 20.78 | Q |
| 9 | 3 | Gary Ryan | Ireland | 20.79w | Q |
| 10 | 2 | Marc Foucan | France | 20.85 | Q |
| 11 | 4 | Panagiotis Sarris | Greece | 20.86 | Q |
| 12 | 2 | Hirofumi Nakagawa | Japan | 20.92 | Q |
| 13 | 3 | Andrea Colombo | Italy | 20.94w | Q |
| 14 | 3 | John Stewart | Great Britain | 20.95w | Q |
| 15 | 2 | Malik Louahla | Algeria | 20.96 | Q |
| 16 | 1 | Alessandro Attene | Italy | 20.97 | |
| 16 | 3 | Glenn Smith | Canada | 20.97w | |
| 18 | 4 | Christie van Wyk | Namibia | 21.04 | Q, PB |
| 19 | 4 | Lee Roy Newton | South Africa | 21.14 | |
| 20 | 3 | Tadashi Imori | Japan | 21.17w | |
| 21 | 2 | Denis Nikolayev | Russia | 21.26 | |
| 22 | 3 | Tommy Kafri | Israel | 21.29w | |
| 23 | 1 | Ambrose Ezenwa | Nigeria | 21.39 | |
| 24 | 1 | Vitor Jorge | Portugal | 21.42 | |
| 25 | 1 | Janne Hautaniemi | Finland | 21.52 | |
| 26 | 3 | Olatunji Olayemi | Nigeria | 21.53w | |
| 27 | 2 | Russell Brooks | Canada | 21.55 | |
| 28 | 2 | Israel Núñez | Spain | 21.71 | |
| 29 | 4 | Boštjan Horvat | Slovenia | 30.24 | |
| | 2 | Juan Pedro Toledo | Mexico | DQ | R141.2 |
| | 4 | Sean Baldock | Great Britain | DNF | |
| | 4 | Alpha Babacar Sall | Senegal | DNF | |

=== Semifinals ===
Wind:
Heat 1: -2.1 m/s, Heat 2: -2.9 m/s

| Rank | Heat | Athlete | Nationality | Time | Notes |
|---|---|---|---|---|---|
| 1 | 1 | Coby Miller | United States | 20.54 | Q |
| 2 | 2 | Christopher Williams | Jamaica | 20.65 | Q |
| 3 | 1 | Patrick van Balkom | Netherlands | 20.67 | Q |
| 4 | 1 | Christos Magos | Greece | 20.70 | Q, PB |
| 5 | 2 | Roland Németh | Hungary | 20.80 | Q |
| 6 | 1 | Andrea Colombo | Italy | 20.87 | Q |
| 7 | 1 | Marc Foucan | France | 20.91 | |
| 8 | 2 | Panagiotis Sarris | Greece | 20.92 | Q |
| 9 | 1 | Ricardo Roach | Chile | 20.93 | |
| 10 | 2 | Patrick Johnson | Australia | 20.98 | Q |
| 11 | 2 | Gary Ryan | Ireland | 21.06 | |
| 12 | 1 | Torbjörn Eriksson | Sweden | 21.09 | |
| 13 | 1 | Christie van Wyk | Namibia | 21.23 | |
| 14 | 2 | John Stewart | Great Britain | 21.29 | |
| 15 | 2 | Hirofumi Nakagawa | Japan | 21.30 | |
| 16 | 2 | Malik Louahla | Algeria | 21.35 | |

=== Final ===
Wind: -1.0 m/s

| Rank | Athlete | Nationality | Time | Notes |
|---|---|---|---|---|
| 1st place, gold medalist(s) | Coby Miller | United States | 20.32 | |
| 2nd place, silver medalist(s) | Patrick van Balkom | Netherlands | 20.57 | |
| 3rd place, bronze medalist(s) | Christos Magos | Greece | 20.70 | =PB |
| 4 | Roland Németh | Hungary | 20.78 | |
| 5 | Andrea Colombo | Italy | 20.90 | |
| 6 | Patrick Johnson | Australia | 21.06 | |
| 7 | Panagiotis Sarris | Greece | 21.08 | |
| | Christopher Williams | Jamaica | DQ | R141.2 |
