= 2002 African Championships in Athletics – Men's 400 metres =

The men's 400 metres event at the 2002 African Championships in Athletics was held in Radès, Tunisia on August 6–8.

== Medalists ==
Gold	Silver	Bronze
Eric Milazar; Mauritius	Sofiane Labidi; Tunisia	Marcus la Grange; South Africa

== Results ==
=== Heats ===
Rank	Heat	Name	Nationality	Time	Notes
1	5	Adem Hecini	Algeria	46.45	Q
2	5	Fernando Augustin	Mauritius	46.56	Q
3	2	Marcus la Grange	South Africa	46.69	Q
4	5	Abdellatif El Ghazaoui	Morocco	46.72	q
5	2	Amin Badany Goma'a	Egypt	46.75	Q
6	5	Nabil Jabir	Morocco	46.83	q
7	1	Ezrah Sambu	Kenya	47.22	Q
8	2	Seydina Doucouré	Senegal	47.41	q
9	4	Sofiane Labidi	Tunisia	47.65	Q
10	3	Eric Milazar	Mauritius	47.69	Q
11	4	Johnson Kubisa	Botswana	47.74	Q
12	1	Narcisse Tevoedjre	Benin	47.75	Q
13	3	Papa Serigne Diene	Senegal	48.13	Q
14	4	Abdelkrim Khoudri	Morocco	48.37	q
15	2	Laroussi Titi	Tunisia	48.54	q
16	1	Gezahegn Alemu	Ethiopia	48.56	q
17	5	Youba Hmeida	Mauritania	48.72	
18	3	Evans Marie	Seychelles	48.77	
19	4	Ousmane Niang	Senegal	48.93	
20	5	Abubaker El Gatroni	Libya	49.27	
21	1	Jean-François Degrace	Mauritius	49.36	
22	4	Vital Manibakiza	Rwanda	50.40	
23	5	Joseph Kagisye	Burundi	50.46	
24	3	Antonio Nzovo Ngonga	Angola	50.80	
25	2	Michael Tesfay	Eritrea	54.81	
	1	Manuel Marques	Angola	DNS	
	1	Thomas Sahr	Sierra Leone	DNS	
	1	Frank Turay	Sierra Leone	DNS	
	2	John Fullah	Sierra Leone	DNS	
	3	Gary Kikaya	Democratic Republic of the Congo	DNS	
	3	Young Talkmore Nyongani	Zimbabwe	DNS	
	3	Malik Louahla	Algeria	DNS	
	4	Lewis Banda	Zimbabwe	DNS	
	4	Benjamin Youla	Republic of the Congo	DNS	
	5	Philip Mukomana	Zimbabwe	DNS	

=== Semifinals ===
Rank	Heat	Name	Nationality	Time	Notes
1	1	Adem Hecini	Algeria	45.98	Q
2	1	Eric Milazar	Mauritius	46.07	Q
3	1	Sofiane Labidi	Tunisia	46.09	Q
4	2	Marcus la Grange	South Africa	46.53	Q
5	1	Johnson Kubisa	Botswana	46.55	Q
6	2	Fernando Augustin	Mauritius	46.64	Q
7	2	Ezrah Sambu	Kenya	46.70	Q
8	2	Abdellatif El Ghazaoui	Morocco	46.80	Q
9	2	Amin Badany Goma'a	Egypt	47.04	
10	1	Seydina Doucouré	Senegal	47.38	
11	1	Nabil Jabir	Morocco	47.77	
12	1	Narcisse Tevoedjre	Benin	48.09	
13	2	Abdelkrim Khoudri	Morocco	48.36	
14	1	Gezahegn Alemu	Ethiopia	48.43	
15	2	Laroussi Titi	Tunisia	48.76	
	2	Papa Serigne Diene	Senegal	DNS	

=== Final ===
Rank	Name	Nationality	Time	Notes
1st place, gold medalist(s)	Eric Milazar	Mauritius	45.67	
2nd place, silver medalist(s)	Sofiane Labidi	Tunisia	45.87	
3rd place, bronze medalist(s)	Marcus la Grange	South Africa	45.95	
4	Adem Hecini	Algeria	46.26	
5	Fernando Augustin	Mauritius	47.03	
6	Abdellatif El Ghazaoui	Morocco	47.26	
7	Johnson Kubisa	Botswana	1:07.97	
	Ezrah Sambu	Kenya	DNS	
