= 1995 CARIFTA Games =

XXIV CARIFTA Games
- Dates: April 15–17
- Host city: George Town, Cayman Islands
- Level: Junior and Youth
- Events: 58
- Participation: about 249 athletes from about 19 nations

The 24th CARIFTA Games was held in George Town, Cayman Islands, on April 15–17, 1995.

== Participation (unofficial) ==
Detailed result lists can be found on the "World Junior Athletics History" website. An unofficial count yields the number of about 249 athletes (145 junior (under-20) and 104 youth (under-17)) from about 19 countries: Antigua and Barbuda (3), Aruba (3), Bahamas (33), Barbados (35), Bermuda (12), British Virgin Islands (4), Cayman Islands (8), Dominica (3), French Guiana (2), Grenada (3), Guadeloupe (18), Guyana (5), Jamaica (61), Martinique (15), Saint Kitts and Nevis (5), Saint Lucia (4), Trinidad and Tobago (29), Turks and Caicos Islands (2), US Virgin Islands (4).

== Austin Sealy Award ==
The Austin Sealy Trophy for the most outstanding athlete of the games was awarded to Debbie Ferguson from the Bahamas. She won 3 gold medals (100m, 200m, and 4 × 100m relay) and a silver medal (4 × 400m relay) in the junior (U-20) category. In total, she won 7 gold, 9 silver, and 2 bronze CARIFTA games medals.

== Medal summary ==
Medal winners are published by category: Boys under 20 (Junior), Girls under 20 (Junior), Boys under 17 (Youth), and Girls under 17 (Youth). Complete results can be found on the "World Junior Athletics History" website.

=== Boys under 20 (Junior) ===
Event	Gold		Silver		Bronze	
100 metres	Lindel Frater (JAM)	10.60	Judson Jervis (BAH)	10.71	Kim Collins (SKN)	10.75
200 metres	Elston Cawley (JAM)	21.14	Judson Jervis (BAH)	21.22	Ruddy Zami (GLP)	21.38
400 metres	Avard Moncur (BAH)	47.40	Omar Bailey (JAM)	47.70	Robert Loubli (GLP)	47.97
800 metres	Joël Morentin (GLP)	1:54.52	Howard Reid (JAM)	1:55.13	Ivor Hamilton (TRI)	1:55.77
1500 metres	Delmore Delevante (JAM)	3:57.89	Howard Reid (JAM)	3:59.84	Winston Aberdeen (TRI)	3:59.84
5000 metres	Delmore Delevante (JAM)	15:29.71	Michael Tomlin (JAM)	15:33.14	Narvin Beharry (TRI)	15:59.91
110 metres hurdles (-2.3 m/s)	Maurice Wignall (JAM)	14.44	Arantes Lewin (JAM)	15.02	Stephen Jones (BAR)	15.40
400 metres hurdles	Andrew Triplett (JAM)	52.52	Angelito Davis (JAM)	52.55	Jake Belgrave (BAR)	54.47
High jump	Enrico Gordon (JAM); Robert Bynoe (GUY)	2.17			Stephen Woodley (BER); Patrice Lucea (GUF)	2.08
Pole vault	Ian Butler (BAH)	3.60	Michael Jones (BAH)	3.50	Moise Louisy-Louis (MTQ)	3.30
Long jump	Maurice Wignall (JAM)	7.78w	Elston Cawley (JAM)	7.44w	Osbourne Moxey (BAH)	7.21
Triple jump	Allen Mortimer (BAH)	15.42	Alvaro McDonald (BAH)	15.32	Maurice Wignall (JAM)	15.24
Shot put	Olivier Andirin (GLP)	14.37	Dave Stoute (TRI)	13.97	Donald Heaven (JAM)	13.74
Discus throw	Anthony Alexander (TRI)	45.64	Ahville Black (JAM)	43.82	Dominic Powell (CAY)	40.94
Javelin throw	Selwyn Smith (GRN)	59.60	Coyotito Gray (BAH)	57.44	Bradley Williams (BAH)	56.08
4 × 100 metres relay	Jamaica; Roy Bailey; Lindel Frater; Ricardo Williams; Elston Cawley	40.68	Guadeloupe; Didier Héry; Robert Loubli; Olivier Quernel; Ruddy Zami	41.02	Trinidad and Tobago; Sean Henry; Niconnor Alexander; Alvin Henry; Honory McDonald	41.57
4 × 400 metres relay	Jamaica; Andrew Triplett; Mark Neish; Angelito Davis; Omar Bailey	3:13.08	Bahamas; Judson Jervis; Dominic Demeritte; Von Wilson; Avard Moncur	3:15.69	Barbados; Jake Belgrave; Andre Estwick; Fabian Rollins; Lloyd Scantlebury	3:15.99

=== Girls under 20 (Junior) ===
Event	Gold		Silver		Bronze	
100 metres	Debbie Ferguson (BAH)	11.35	Kerry-Ann Richards (JAM)	11.65	Cydonie Mothersill (CAY)	11.72
200 metres	Debbie Ferguson (BAH)	23.17	Peta-Gaye Dowdie (JAM)	23.81	Cydonie Mothersill (CAY)	23.83
400 metres	Claudine Williams (JAM)	52.50	Tonique Williams (BAH)	53.30	Tanya Jarrett (JAM)	53.91
800 metres	Donnette Whyte (JAM)	2:08.19	Vernetta Rolle (BAH)	2:09.05	Aydollie Miller (JAM)	2:09.15
1500 metres	Evette Turner (JAM)	4:37.24	Aydollie Miller (JAM)	4:47.86	Sandra Scott (GRN)	4:58.34
3000 metres	Evette Turner (JAM)	10:03.67	Tameica Brown (JAM)	10:25.42	Keisha Gray (TRI)	10:34.53
100 metres hurdles (-0.9 m/s)	Peta-Gaye Dowdie (JAM)	14.75	Cynthia Octavia (MTQ)	14.84	Tomeca Brown (JAM)	14.85
400 metres hurdles	Tanya Jarrett (JAM)	58.14	Andrea Blackett (BAR)	59.80	Alicia Ferguson (TRI)	65.31
High jump	Sophia Forde (BAR)	1.76	Natalie Richardson (JAM)	1.73	Hareldaw Argyle (GUY)	1.73
Long jump	Michelle Baptiste (LCA)	5.66	Nicole Duncan (JAM)	5.61	Roatter Johnson (SKN)	5.37
Triple jump	Eugénie Elisabeth (GUF)	11.90	Sophia Forde (BAR)	11.79	Tomeca Brown (JAM)	11.77w
Shot put	Rhonda Hackett (TRI)	13.54	Christelle Bornil (MTQ)	13.00	Nathalie Bechet (GUF)	12.75
Discus throw	Rhonda Hackett (TRI)	43.16	Doris Thompson (BAH)	39.28	Christelle Bornil (MTQ)	37.90
Javelin throw	Shenique Musgrove (BAH)	42.64	Wenita Ford (BAH)	41.82	Nadine Clarke (JAM)	34.60
4 × 100 metres relay	Bahamas; Tamara Cherebin; Tonique Williams; Dewanna Wright; Debbie Ferguson	45.00	Guadeloupe; Nadine Mahobah; Sandra Citté; Nessa Andreopa; Isabelle Beaumont	45.68	Jamaica; Tulia Robinson; Peta-Gaye Dowdie; Maria Brown; Kerry-Ann Richards	46.13
4 × 400 metres relay	Jamaica; Sophia Surgeon; Tanya Jarrett; Donette Whyte; Claudine Williams	3:34.88	Bahamas; Tonique Williams; Vernetta Rolle; Altrice Taylor; Debbie Ferguson	3:39.46	Barbados; Tanya Oxley; Sherlene Williams; Andrea Blackett; Melissa Straker	3:40.16

=== Boys under 17 (Youth) ===
Event	Gold		Silver		Bronze	
100 metres (0.1 m/s)	Roy Bailey (JAM)	10.83	Avery Rudder (BAR)	11.18	Désiré Delric (MTQ)	11.29
200 metres (0.1 m/s)	Roy Bailey (JAM)	21.65	Cédric Gold-Dalg (MTQ)	22.25	Avery Rudder (BAR)	22.47
400 metres	Carlon Harrison (JAM)	49.32	Von Wilson (BAH)	50.03	Omar Blackwood (JAM)	50.53
800 metres	Carlon Harrison (JAM)	1:59.45	Omar Blackwood (JAM)	2:00.75	Lionel Barranco (TCA)	2:02.73
1500 metres	Lionel Barranco (TCA)	4:17.52	Gareth Peters (JAM)	4:18.21	Marlon Destin (ATG)	4:19.85
100 metres hurdles (-1.5 m/s)	Désiré Delric (MTQ)	13.84	Selwyn Ulett (JAM)	13.90	Kyle Griffith (BAR)	13.96
400 metres hurdles	Garth McLean (TRI)	55.95	Selwyn Ulett (JAM)	56.59	Mark Riley (JAM)	57.43
High jump	Nester Keith (JAM)	1.97	Latico Sands (BAH)	1.91	Kevin Cumberbatch (BAR)	1.88
Long jump	Roy Bailey (JAM)	6.81	Pascal Mayaud (MTQ)	6.79	Avery Rudder (BAR)	6.76
Triple jump	Sébastien Pincemail (GLP)	14.97	Gregory Hughes (BAR)	14.33	Stéphane Saxemard (MTQ)	14.30
Shot put	Claston Bernard (JAM)	12.54	Craig Smith (BAR)	12.19	Elroy Bryan (CAY)	12.15
Discus throw	Paul Prendergast (JAM)	38.90	Jamico Sands (BAH)	35.06	Ronnie Mendoza (BAR)	33.52
Javelin throw	Brian Husbands (BAR)	55.12	Richard Rock (BAR)	53.20	Steeve Mixtur (GLP)	50.52

=== Girls under 17 (Youth) ===
Event	Gold		Silver		Bronze	
100 metres (0.2 m/s)	Sonia Williams (ATG)	11.76	Tulia Robinson (JAM)	11.81	Aleen Bailey (JAM)	12.10
200 metres (0.2 m/s)	Sonia Williams (ATG)	23.99	Dewana Wright (BAH)	24.28	Tulia Robinson (JAM)	24.41
400 metres	Gabriella Edwards (TRI)	55.20	Sophia Surgeon (JAM)	56.21	Onica Fraser (GUY)	56.43
800 metres	Janelle Inniss (BAR)	2:15.38	Keisha Gray (TRI)	2:16.45	Petrona McClymont (JAM)	2:17.31
1500 metres	Janelle Inniss (BAR)	4:46.15	Keisha Gray (TRI)	4:46.58	Petrona McClymont (JAM)	4:48.09
100 metres hurdles (-3.5 m/s)	Tulia Robinson (JAM)	13.96	Kaysia McKoy (JAM)	15.72	Makeda Prime (TRI)	15.93
300 metres hurdles	Kaysia McKoy (JAM)	43.61	Theresa Morris (TRI)	44.91	Lucyann Richards (BAR)	45.39
High jump	Nyota Peters (GUY)	1.66	Donnette McIntosh (JAM)	1.63	Jessica Pina (ARU)	1.60
Long jump	Marie-Hélène Carabin (GLP)	5.51	Christine Brown (JAM)	5.49	Nyota Peters (GUY)	5.43
Shot put	Joëlle Julianne (MTQ)	11.23	Sheeba George (GRN)	10.44	Melissa Gibbons (JAM)	9.74
Discus throw	Béatrice Louisy-Louis (MTQ)	38.46	Tanya Thomas (JAM)	35.56	Sheeba George (GRN)	32.76
Javelin throw	Anna-Lee Walcott (TRI)	37.50	Candi White (BAH)	33.20	Ann McKoy (BAH)	32.78

== Medal table (unofficial) ==
* Host nation (Cayman Islands)

Rank	Nation	Gold	Silver	Bronze	Total
1	Jamaica (JAM)	27	24	15	66
2	Bahamas (BAH)	7	16	3	26
3	Trinidad and Tobago (TTO)	6	4	7	17
4	Barbados (BAR)	4	6	10	20
5	Guadeloupe (GLP)	4	2	3	9
6	Martinique (MTQ)	3	4	4	11
7	Guyana (GUY)	2	0	3	5
8	Antigua and Barbuda (ATG)	2	0	1	3
9	Grenada (GRN)	1	1	2	4
10	French Guiana (GUF)	1	0	2	3
11	Turks and Caicos Islands (TKS)	1	0	1	2
12	Saint Lucia (LCA)	1	0	0	1
13	Cayman Islands (CAY)*	0	0	4	4
14	Saint Kitts and Nevis (SKN)	0	0	2	2
15	Aruba (ARU)	0	0	1	1
15	Bermuda (BER)	0	0	1	1
Totals (16 entries)		59	57	59	175
