= 1996 World Junior Championships in Athletics – Men's 200 metres =

The men's 200 metres event at the 1996 World Junior Championships in Athletics was held in Sydney, Australia, at International Athletic Centre on 23 and 24 August.

== Medalists ==
Gold	Francis Obikwelu; Nigeria
Silver	Riaan Dempers; South Africa
Bronze	Bryan Harrison; United States

== Results ==
=== Final ===
24 August
Wind: -1.6 m/s

Rank	Name	Nationality	Time	Notes
1st place, gold medalist(s)	Francis Obikwelu	Nigeria	20.47	
2nd place, silver medalist(s)	Riaan Dempers	South Africa	20.96	
3rd place, bronze medalist(s)	Bryan Harrison	United States	21.10	
4	Sunday Emmanuel	Nigeria	21.11	
5	Ruddy Zami	France	21.11	
6	Paul Pearce	Australia	21.12	
7	Aldo Tonazzi	Switzerland	21.22	
8	Roy Bailey	Jamaica	21.24	

=== Semifinals ===
24 August

==== Semifinal 1 ====
Wind: -2.9 m/s

Rank	Name	Nationality	Time	Notes
1	Bryan Harrison	United States	21.13	Q
2	Ruddy Zami	France	21.21	Q
3	Roy Bailey	Jamaica	21.25	Q
4	Sunday Emmanuel	Nigeria	21.27	Q
5	David Baxter	Australia	21.32	
6	Marcus La Grange	South Africa	21.51	
7	Alessandro Attene	Italy	21.53	
8	Uvie Ugono	United Kingdom	21.70	

==== Semifinal 2 ====
Wind: -0.8 m/s

Rank	Name	Nationality	Time	Notes
1	Francis Obikwelu	Nigeria	20.95	Q
2	Riaan Dempers	South Africa	21.25	Q
3	Paul Pearce	Australia	21.38	Q
4	Aldo Tonazzi	Switzerland	21.40	Q
5	Christian Malcolm	United Kingdom	21.52	
6	Didier Héry	France	21.56	
7	Paulo Poersch	Brazil	21.60	
8	Dean Wise	New Zealand	21.75	

=== Quarterfinals ===
23 August

==== Quarterfinal 1 ====
Wind: +0.5 m/s

Rank	Name	Nationality	Time	Notes
1	Didier Héry	France	21.18	Q
2	Roy Bailey	Jamaica	21.22	Q
3	Paul Pearce	Australia	21.27	Q
4	Uvie Ugono	United Kingdom	21.42	Q
5	Charles Allen	Canada	21.52	
6	Christie van Wyk	Namibia	21.54	
7	Daniel Zimmer	Germany	21.81	
8	Grabiel González	Cuba	21.89	

==== Quarterfinal 2 ====
Wind: -1.5 m/s

Rank	Name	Nationality	Time	Notes
1	Ruddy Zami	France	21.03	Q
2	Sunday Emmanuel	Nigeria	21.09	Q
3	Marcus La Grange	South Africa	21.32	Q
4	Christian Malcolm	United Kingdom	21.33	Q
5	Hiroki Takahashi	Japan	21.68	
6	Valentin Borsuk	Belarus	21.76	
7	Misael Ortíz	Cuba	21.91	
	William To Wai Lok	Hong Kong	DNS	

==== Quarterfinal 3 ====
Wind: -1.1 m/s

Rank	Name	Nationality	Time	Notes
1	Bryan Harrison	United States	21.18	Q
2	Paulo Poersch	Brazil	21.25	Q
3	Aldo Tonazzi	Switzerland	21.31	Q
4	David Baxter	Australia	21.48	Q
5	Michele Paggi	Italy	21.64	
6	Konstadínos Voyiatzákis	Greece	21.73	
7	Dominic Demeritte	Bahamas	21.79	
8	David Wilson	Guam	21.83	

==== Quarterfinal 4 ====
Wind: -1.6 m/s

Rank	Name	Nationality	Time	Notes
1	Francis Obikwelu	Nigeria	20.83	Q
2	Riaan Dempers	South Africa	21.12	Q
3	Alessandro Attene	Italy	21.28	Q
4	Dean Wise	New Zealand	21.49	Q
5	Vince Williams	United States	21.50	
6	Masayuki Okusako	Japan	21.61	
7	Malik Louahla	Algeria	22.06	
8	Raman Ganeshwaran	Malaysia	22.14	

=== Heats ===
23 August

==== Heat 1 ====
Wind: -2.9 m/s

Rank	Name	Nationality	Time	Notes
1	Riaan Dempers	South Africa	21.36	Q
2	Ruddy Zami	France	21.53	Q
3	Christian Malcolm	United Kingdom	21.83	Q
4	Daniel Zimmer	Germany	21.94	Q
5	Thobias Akwenye	Namibia	22.09	
6	Joseph Colville	Costa Rica	22.43	
7	Adam Afrah	Maldives	24.58	

==== Heat 2 ====
Wind: -0.8 m/s

Rank	Name	Nationality	Time	Notes
1	Aldo Tonazzi	Switzerland	21.54	Q
2	Paulo Poersch	Brazil	21.57	Q
3	Paul Pearce	Australia	21.70	Q
4	Valentin Borsuk	Belarus	21.83	Q
5	Grabiel González	Cuba	22.02	q
6	Corey Chase	New Zealand	22.08	
7	Evággelos Asaryiotákis	Greece	22.80	

==== Heat 3 ====
Wind: +0.2 m/s

Rank	Name	Nationality	Time	Notes
1	Francis Obikwelu	Nigeria	21.33	Q
2	Alessandro Attene	Italy	21.64	Q
3	Christie van Wyk	Namibia	21.70	Q
4	Dean Wise	New Zealand	21.75	Q
5	Konstadínos Voyiatzákis	Greece	22.00	q

==== Heat 4 ====
Wind: -0.7 m/s

Rank	Name	Nationality	Time	Notes
1	Sunday Emmanuel	Nigeria	21.25	Q
2	Didier Héry	France	21.38	Q
3	Bryan Harrison	United States	21.44	Q
4	Dominic Demeritte	Bahamas	21.80	Q
5	Malik Louahla	Algeria	21.99	q
6	William To Wai Lok	Hong Kong	22.05	q
7	Ali Al-Neyadi	United Arab Emirates	22.80	

==== Heat 5 ====
Wind: +0.3 m/s

Rank	Name	Nationality	Time	Notes
1	David Baxter	Australia	21.32	Q
2	Marcus La Grange	South Africa	21.34	Q
3	Masayuki Okusako	Japan	21.41	Q
4	Michele Paggi	Italy	21.49	Q
5	David Wilson	Guam	21.78	q
6	Raman Ganeshwaran	Malaysia	21.91	q
7	Maqsood Ahmed	Pakistan	22.70	

==== Heat 6 ====
Wind: -1.8 m/s

Rank	Name	Nationality	Time	Notes
1	Roy Bailey	Jamaica	21.19	Q
2	Charles Allen	Canada	21.43	Q
3	Misael Ortíz	Cuba	21.44	Q
4	Vince Williams	United States	21.52	Q
5	Uvie Ugono	United Kingdom	21.64	q
6	Hiroki Takahashi	Japan	21.75	q
7	Frantz Valbona	Haiti	22.51	
	Jeffrey Bai	Papua New Guinea	DQ	(163.3)

== Participation ==
According to an unofficial count, 41 athletes from 29 countries participated in the event.

- Algeria (1)
- Australia (2)
- Bahamas (1)
- Belarus (1)
- Brazil (1)
- Canada (1)
- Costa Rica (1)
- Cuba (2)
- France (2)
- Germany (1)
- Greece (2)
- Guam (1)
- Haiti (1)
- Hong Kong (1)
- Italy (2)
- Jamaica (1)
- Japan (2)
- Malaysia (1)
- Maldives (1)
- Namibia (2)
- New Zealand (2)
- Nigeria (2)
- Pakistan (1)
- Papua New Guinea (1)
- South Africa (2)
- Switzerland (1)
- United Arab Emirates (1)
- United Kingdom (2)
- United States (2)
