= 2003 IAAF World Indoor Championships – Men's 200 metres =

The men's 200 metres event at the 2003 IAAF World Indoor Championships was held on March 14–15.

== Medalists ==
Gold	Silver	Bronze
Marlon Devonish; Great Britain	Joseph Batangdon; Cameroon	Dominic Demeritte; Bahamas

== Results ==
=== Heats ===
First 2 of each heat (Q) qualified directly for the semifinals.

Rank	Heat	Name	Nationality	Time	Notes
1	3	Shawn Crawford	United States	20.69	Q
2	4	Matic Osovnikar	Slovenia	20.77	Q, NR
3	1	Marco Torrieri	Italy	20.78	Q, PB
3	6	Marlon Devonish	Great Britain	20.78	Q
5	6	Bobby Williams	United States	20.90	Q
6	4	Patrick van Balkom	Netherlands	20.91	Q, SB
7	2	Joseph Batangdon	Cameroon	20.95	Q
7	4	Leslie Djhone	France	20.95	q
9	5	Dominic Demeritte	Bahamas	21.00	Q
10	5	Paul Brizzel	Ireland	21.02	Q
11	2	Gary Ryan	Ireland	21.07	Q
12	1	Allyn Condon	Great Britain	21.14	Q
13	2	Johan Wissman	Sweden	21.17	
14	3	Stefano Dacastello	Italy	21.29	Q
15	3	Santiago Ezquerro	Spain	21.31	
16	1	Johan Engberg	Sweden	21.36	
17	5	Adrian Durant	United States Virgin Islands	21.60	NR
18	4	Oumar Loum	Senegal	21.62	
19	5	Chao Un Kei	Macau	22.42	NR
	1	Bruno Pacheco	Brazil	DQ	
	2	Heber Viera	Uruguay	DQ	
	3	Roman Cress	Marshall Islands	DQ	
	6	Damien Degroote	France	DQ	
	6	Uchenna Emedolu	Nigeria	DNS	

=== Semifinals ===
First 2 of each semifinal (Q) qualified directly for the final.

Rank	Heat	Name	Nationality	Time	Notes
1	3	Marlon Devonish	Great Britain	20.63	Q
2	2	Joseph Batangdon	Cameroon	20.65	Q
3	1	Dominic Demeritte	Bahamas	20.67	Q, NR
4	2	Matic Osovnikar	Slovenia	20.87	Q
5	3	Marco Torrieri	Italy	20.91	Q
6	3	Paul Brizzel	Ireland	20.96	
7	1	Allyn Condon	Great Britain	21.03	Q
8	1	Leslie Djhone	France	21.09	
9	2	Gary Ryan	Ireland	21.13	
10	2	Stefano Dacastello	Italy	21.20	
11	1	Patrick van Balkom	Netherlands	21.26	
	1	Shawn Crawford	United States	DQ	
	3	Bobby Williams	United States	DQ	

=== Final ===
Rank	Lane	Name	Nationality	Time	React	Notes
1st place, gold medalist(s)	6	Marlon Devonish	Great Britain	20.62	0.163	
2nd place, silver medalist(s)	5	Joseph Batangdon	Cameroon	20.76	0.195	
3rd place, bronze medalist(s)	4	Dominic Demeritte	Bahamas	20.92	0.222	
4	3	Matic Osovnikar	Slovenia	21.17	0.178	
5	1	Marco Torrieri	Italy	21.68	0.206	
	2	Allyn Condon	Great Britain	DQ		
