= 1999 World Championships in Athletics – Men's 200 metres =

Men's 200 metres at the 1999 World Championships
- Venue: Estadio Olímpico
- Dates: 21 August (heats); 21 August (quarter-finals); 25 August (semi-finals); 27 August (final)
- Competitors: 72
- Winning time: 19.90

Medalists
gold medal	Maurice Greene	United States
silver medal	Claudinei da Silva	Brazil
bronze medal	Francis Obikwelu	Nigeria

These are the official results of the Men's 200 metres event at the 1999 IAAF World Championships in Seville, Spain. There were a total number of 72 participating athletes, with ten qualifying heats, four quarter-finals, two semi-finals and the final held on Friday 27 August 1999 at 20:00h. The winning margin was 0.10 seconds.

== Final ==
Frank Fredericks was forced to scratch from the final after he injured his hamstring while warming up.

RANK	FINAL	TIME
	Maurice Greene (USA)	19.90
	Claudinei da Silva (BRA)	20.00
	Francis Obikwelu (NGR)	20.11
4.	Obadele Thompson (BAR)	20.23
5.	Marcin Urbaś (POL)	20.30
6.	Kevin Little (USA)	20.37
7.	Julian Golding (GBR)	20.48
	Frank Fredericks (NAM)	DNS

== Semi-final ==
- Held on Wednesday 25 August 1999

RANK	HEAT 1	TIME
1.	Maurice Greene (USA)	20.10
2.	Claudinei da Silva (BRA)	20.13
3.	Julian Golding (GBR)	20.28
4.	Obadele Thompson (BAR)	20.36
5.	Christopher Williams (JAM)	20.48
6.	Koji Ito (JPN)	20.51
7.	John Ertzgard (NOR)	20.72
8.	Stefan Holz (GER)	21.89

RANK	HEAT 2	TIME
1.	Francis Obikwelu (NGR)	19.84
2.	Marcin Urbaś (POL)	19.98 (NR)
3.	Kevin Little (USA)	20.10
4.	Frank Fredericks (NAM)	20.10
5.	Marlon Devonish (GBR)	20.25
6.	Iván García (CUB)	20.38
7.	Glenn Smith (CAN)	20.72
	Patrick Stevens (BEL)	DNS

== Quarter-finals ==
- Held on Saturday 21 August 1999

RANK	HEAT 1	TIME
1.	Claudinei da Silva (BRA)	20.22
2.	Obadele Thompson (BAR)	20.26
3.	Kevin Little (USA)	20.38
4.	Stefan Holz (GER)	20.59
5.	Panagiotis Sarris (GRE)	20.65
6.	Renward Wells (BAH)	20.66
7.	Matt Shirvington (AUS)	20.67
8.	Douglas Turner (GBR)	21.08

RANK	HEAT 2	TIME
1.	Maurice Greene (USA)	20.23
2.	Julian Golding (GBR)	20.32
3.	John Ertzgard (NOR)	20.61
4.	Glenn Smith (CAN)	20.65
5.	Marcus La Grange (RSA)	20.81
6.	Martin Lachkovics (AUT)	20.89
	Konstantinos Kenteris (GRE)	DNS
	Anninos Markoullides (CYP)	DQ

RANK	HEAT 3	TIME
1.	Marlon Devonish (GBR)	20.51
2.	Iván García (CUB)	20.57
3.	Christopher Williams (JAM)	20.59
4.	Koji Ito (JPN)	20.62
5.	Torbjörn Eriksson (SWE)	20.74
6.	Curtis Perry (USA)	20.76
7.	Joseph Loua (GUI)	20.83
8.	Chris Donaldson (NZL)	20.96

RANK	HEAT 4	TIME
1.	Frank Fredericks (NAM)	20.11
2.	Francis Obikwelu (NGR)	20.15
3.	Marcin Urbaś (POL)	20.32
4.	Patrick Stevens (BEL)	20.49
5.	Patrick van Balkom (NED)	20.59
6.	Joseph Batangdon (CMR)	20.70
7.	Antoine Boussombo (GAB)	20.74
8.	Serhiy Osovych (UKR)	20.93

== Heats ==
- Held on Saturday 21 August 1999

RANK	HEAT 1	TIME
1.	Francis Obikwelu (NGR)	20.54
2.	Glenn Smith (CAN)	20.68
3.	Joseph Batangdon (CMR)	20.76
4.	Panagiotis Sarris (GRE)	20.78
5.	Sergey Slukin (RUS)	20.92
6.	Kim Collins (SKN)	20.95
7.	Salem Mubarak Al-Yami (KSA)	21.27

RANK	HEAT 2	TIME
1.	Frank Fredericks (NAM)	20.60
2.	John Ertzgard (NOR)	20.74
3.	Matt Shirvington (AUS)	20.75
4.	Martin Lachkovics (AUT)	20.77
5.	Ricardo Roach (CHI)	21.13
6.	Asli Haseri (BRU)	22.91
	Carlos Gats (ARG)	DQ

RANK	HEAT 3	TIME
1.	Torbjörn Eriksson (SWE)	20.58
2.	Koji Ito (JPN)	20.59
3.	Anninos Markoullides (CYP)	20.73
4.	André da Silva (BRA)	21.04
	Robert Dennis (LBR)	DNS
	Heber Viera (URU)	DQ
	Petko Yankov (BUL)	DQ

RANK	HEAT 4	TIME
1.	Julian Golding (GBR)	20.48
2.	Patrick Stevens (BEL)	20.54
3.	Christopher Williams (JAM)	20.68
4.	Mohammed Al Hooti (OMA)	20.80 (NR)
5.	Tommy Kafri (ISR)	20.89 (NR)
6.	Albert Agyemang (GHA)	20.94
7.	Francisco Javier Navarro (ESP)	20.97

RANK	HEAT 5	TIME
1.	Konstantinos Kenteris (GRE)	20.68
2.	Douglas Turner (GBR)	20.72
3.	Maurice Greene (USA)	20.76
4.	Paul Brizzell (IRL)	21.02
5.	Dean Capobianco (AUS)	21.48
6.	Keita Cline (IVB)	21.69
	Christopher Silas Adolf (PLW)	DQ

RANK	HEAT 6	TIME
1.	Marlon Devonish (GBR)	20.56
2.	Patrick van Balkom (NED)	20.65
3.	Renward Wells (BAH)	20.73
4.	Darryl Wohlsen (AUS)	20.79
5.	Paul Gorries (RSA)	20.94
6.	Malik-Khaled Louahla (ALG)	21.21
7.	Christie van Wyk (NAM)	21.27
8.	Robert Craig (NFK)	24.10

RANK	HEAT 7	TIME
1.	Marcus la Grange (RSA)	20.78
2.	Marcin Urbaś (POL)	20.80
3.	Curtis Perry (USA)	20.86
4.	Joel Mascoll (VIN)	21.25
5.	Sittichai Suwonprateep (THA)	21.32
6.	Christian Nsiah (GHA)	21.36
7.	Kwame Galloway (MSR)	22.88
	Nathanaël Esprit (AHO)	DNS

RANK	HEAT 8	TIME
1.	Claudinei da Silva (BRA)	20.38
2.	Iván García (CUB)	20.59
3.	Antoine Boussombo (GAB)	20.72
4.	Erik Wijmeersch (BEL)	20.89
5.	Sebastián Keitel (CHI)	20.90
6.	Wu-Shiun Tao (TPE)	21.38
7.	Sherwin James (DMA)	21.54

RANK	HEAT 9	TIME
1.	Kevin Little (USA)	20.76
2.	Chris Donaldson (NZL)	20.87
3.	Serhiy Osovych (UKR)	20.91
4.	Juan Pedro Toledo (MEX)	21.00
5.	Gennadiy Chernovol (KAZ)	21.05
6.	Kenneth Andam (GHA)	21.31
7.	Dominic Demeritte (BAH)	21.41

RANK	HEAT 10	TIME
1.	Obadele Thompson (BAR)	20.70
2.	Stefan Holz (GER)	20.74
3.	Joseph Loua (GUI)	20.80
4.	Georgios Panagiotopoulos (GRE)	20.82
5.	Gary Ryan (IRL)	20.86
6.	Sunday Emmanuel (NGR)	21.12
7.	Djaffar Hadhari (COM)	21.39
