= Christie van Wyk =

Namibian sprinter

Personal information
- Born: 12 October 1977 (age 49)

Sport
- Sport: Track and field

Christoffel "Christie" van Wyk (born 12 October 1977) is a Namibian retired sprinter who competed in the 100 and 200 metres. He represented his country at two consecutive Summer Olympics starting in 2000.

== Competition record ==
Year	Competition	Venue	Position	Event	Notes
Representing Namibia
1996	World Junior Championships	Sydney, Australia	19th (qf)	200 m	21.54 (wind: +0.5 m/s)
1996	World Junior Championships	Sydney, Australia	12th (h)	4 × 100 m relay	40.84
1997	Universiade	Catania, Italy	47th (h)	100 m	11.11
1997	Universiade	Catania, Italy	38th (h)	200 m	21.83
1997	Universiade	Catania, Italy	16th (h)	4 × 100 m relay	41.60
1997	Universiade	Catania, Italy	13th (h)	4 × 400 m relay	3:15.13
1998	Commonwealth Games	Kuala Lumpur, Malaysia	44th (h)	100 m	11.03
1998	Commonwealth Games	Kuala Lumpur, Malaysia	13th (h)	4 × 100 m relay	41.58
1998	Commonwealth Games	Kuala Lumpur, Malaysia	15th (h)	4 × 400 m relay	3:11.60
1999	Universiade	Palma de Mallorca, Spain	35th (h)	100 m	10.84
1999	Universiade	Palma de Mallorca, Spain	(sf)	200 m	21.23
1999	World Championships	Seville, Spain	52nd (h)	200 m	21.27
1999	All-Africa Games	Johannesburg, South Africa	7th	200 m	20.99
2000	Olympic Games	Sydney, Australia	65th (h)	200 m	46.57
2001	World Championships	Edmonton, Canada	40th (h)	200 m	21.25
2002	Commonwealth Games	Manchester, United Kingdom	18th (qf)	100 m	10.58
2002	African Championships	Radès, Tunisia	4th	100 m	10.30 (w)
2004	Olympic Games	Athens, Greece	48th (h)	100 m	10.49
2005	Universiade	İzmir, Turkey	8th (sf)	100 m	10.67
2005	Universiade	İzmir, Turkey	13th (qf)	200 m	21.26
2005	Universiade	İzmir, Turkey	13th (h)	4 × 100 m relay	41.18

== Personal bests ==
Outdoor

- 100 metres – 10.09 (+2.0 m/s) (Abilene 2004)
- 200 metres – 20.50 (+0.8 m/s) (Lappeenranta 2000)

Indoor

- 60 metres – 6.65 (Houston 2002)
- 200 metres – 21.54 (Fayetteville 2001)
