= Dominic Demeritte =

Bahamian sprinter (born 1978)

Personal information
- Born: 22 February 1978 (age 48) Nassau, Bahamas

Sport
- Sport: Track and field
Medal record
Men's athletics
Representing Bahamas
World Indoor Championships
| Gold medal – first place | 2004 Budapest | 200 m |
| Bronze medal – third place | 2003 Birmingham | 200 m |
Commonwealth Games
| Bronze medal – third place | 2002 Manchester | 4 × 400 m relay |
Central American and Caribbean Games
| Silver medal – second place | 2006 Cartagena | 4 × 100 m relay |
CAC Championships
| Gold medal – first place | 2003 St George's | 200 m |
| Bronze medal – third place | 2005 Nassau | 200 m |
| Bronze medal – third place | 2005 Nassau | 4 × 100 m relay |
CAC Junior Championships (U20)
| Silver medal – second place | 1996 San Salvador | 200 m |
| Bronze medal – third place | 1996 San Salvador | 100 m |
| Bronze medal – third place | 1996 San Salvador | 4 × 100 m relay |
CAC Junior Championships (U17)
| Bronze medal – third place | 1994 Port of Spain | Triple jump |
CARIFTA Games Junior (U20)
| Silver medal – second place | 1995 George Town | 4 × 400 m relay |

Dominic Demeritte (born 22 February 1978) is a Bahamian retired track and field sprinter who specialized in the 200 metres.

Demeritte was coached for part of his professional career by Henry Rolle.

== Career ==
He became indoor world champion in 2004, his result 20.66 a new Bahamian record at the time.

He attended University of North Carolina at Chapel Hill where he was a two time NCAA All American.

As of 2022 he is a Track and Field coach at Life University.

== Personal bests ==
- 100 metres – 10.26 (2003)
- 200 metres – 20.21 (2002)
- 400 metres – 47.28 (2002)

== Achievements ==
| Year | Competition | Venue | Position | Event | Notes |
Representing the Bahamas
| 1994 | Central American and Caribbean Junior Championships (U-17) | Port of Spain, Trinidad and Tobago | 3rd | Triple jump | 13.70 m |
| 1994 | Central American and Caribbean Junior Championships (U-17) | Port of Spain, Trinidad and Tobago | 4th | Heptathlon | 2772 pts |
| 1995 | CARIFTA Games (U-20) | George Town, Cayman Islands | 7th | 200 m | 21.90 |
| 1995 | CARIFTA Games (U-20) | George Town, Cayman Islands | 2nd | 4 × 400 m relay | 3:15.69 |
| 1996 | CARIFTA Games (U-20) | Kingston, Jamaica | 5th (sf) | 100 m | 11.01 (0.3 m/s) |
| 1996 | CARIFTA Games (U-20) | Kingston, Jamaica | 5th | 200 m | 22.06 (-3.2 m/s) |
| 1996 | Central American and Caribbean Junior Championships (U-20) | San Salvador, El Salvador | 3rd | 100 m | 10.73 (1.4 m/s) |
| 1996 | Central American and Caribbean Junior Championships (U-20) | San Salvador, El Salvador | 2nd | 200 m | 21.23 (1.0 m/s) |
| 1996 | Central American and Caribbean Junior Championships (U-20) | San Salvador, El Salvador | 3rd | 4 × 100 m relay | 41.51 |
| 1996 | World Junior Championships | Sydney, Australia | 18th (qf) | 100 m | 10.91 (wind: -2.2 m/s) |
| 1996 | World Junior Championships | Sydney, Australia | 25th (qf) | 200 m | 21.79 (wind: -1.1 m/s) |
| 1999 | World Championships | Seville, Spain | 7th (h) | 200 m | 21.41 (-0.4 m/s) |
| 2000 | NACAC Under-25 Championships | Monterrey, Mexico | 2nd | 200 m | 20.85 (wind: -3.9 m/s) |
| 2000 | Olympic Games | Sydney, Australia | 6th (h) | 200 m | 21.47 (-0.1 m/s) |
| 2000 | Olympic Games | Sydney, Australia | 4th (h) | 4 × 100 m relay | 39.57 |
| 2001 | World Championships | Edmonton, Canada | 8th (qf) | 200 m | 20.86 (1.1 m/s) |
| 2001 | World Championships | Edmonton, Canada | 6th (2f) | 4 × 100 m relay | 39.20 |
| 2002 | Commonwealth Games | Manchester, United Kingdom | 4th | 200 m | 20.21 (1.4 m/s) |
| 2002 | Commonwealth Games | Manchester, United Kingdom | 3rd | 4 × 400 m relay | 3:01.35 |
| 2002 | NACAC U-25 Championships | San Antonio, United States | 1st | 200 m | 20.60 (wind: +0.5 m/s) |
| 2002 | NACAC U-25 Championships | San Antonio, United States | 2nd | 4 × 100 m relay | 39.81 |
| 2003 | World Indoor Championships | Birmingham, United Kingdom | 3rd | 200 m | 20.92 |
| 2003 | Central American and Caribbean Championships | St. George's, Grenada | 1st | 200 m | 20.43 |
| 2003 | World Championships | Paris, France | 8th (sf) | 200 m | 20.71 (0.6 m/s) |
| 2004 | World Indoor Championships | Budapest, Hungary | 1st | 200 m | 20.66 NR |
| 2004 | Olympic Games | Athens, Greece | 6th (qf) | 200 m | 20.61 (0.5 m/s) |
| 2005 | Central American and Caribbean Championships | Nassau, Bahamas | 3rd | 200 m | 20.47 |
| 2005 | Central American and Caribbean Championships | Nassau, Bahamas | 3rd | 4 × 100 m relay | 39.08 |
| 2005 | World Championships | Helsinki, Finland | 7th (qf) | 200 m | 21.25 (-1.1 m/s) |
| 2006 | Commonwealth Games | Melbourne, Australia | — | 200 m | DSQ |
| 2006 | Commonwealth Games | Melbourne, Australia | — | 4 × 400 m relay | DNF |
| 2006 | Central American and Caribbean Games | Cartagena, Colombia | 2nd | 4 × 100 m relay | 39.44 |
| 2008 | Central American and Caribbean Championships | Cali, Colombia | 7th (sf) | 200 m | 21.37 (1.1 m/s) |
