= Misael Ortiz =

Cuban sprinter (born 1978)

Personal information
- Born: 4 November 1978 (age 47) Pinar del Rio, Cuba

Sport
- Sport: Track and field
Medal record
Athletics
Representing Cuba
Summer Universiade
Silver medal – second place	1997 Catania	4x100m relay
Central American and Caribbean Games
Gold medal – first place	1998 Maracaibo	4x100m relay
Silver medal – second place	1998 Maracaibo	200m
CAC Junior Championships (U20)
Gold medal – first place	1996 San Salvador	200 m
Gold medal – first place	1996 San Salvador	4x100 m relay
CAC Junior Championships (U17)
Bronze medal – third place	1994 Port of Spain	200 m

Misael Ortiz (born 4 November 1978) is a Cuban sprinter specializing in the 200 metres.

== Career ==
He finished fourth with the Cuban 4 x 100 metres relay team, which consisted of Alfredo García-Baró, Ortiz, Iván García and Luis Alberto Pérez-Rionda, at the 1997 World Championships. On the individual level he won a silver medal at the 1998 Central American and Caribbean Games.

His personal best time over 200 m is 20.83 seconds, achieved in February 1999 in Havana.

He defected to Canada following the 1999 Pan American Games in Winnipeg.

== Achievements ==
Year	Competition	Venue	Position	Event	Notes
Representing Cuba
1994	Central American and Caribbean Junior Championships (U-17)	Port of Spain, Trinidad and Tobago	3rd	200 m	22.8 (-2.5 m/s)
1996	Central American and Caribbean Junior Championships (U-20)	San Salvador, El Salvador	1st	200 m	21.04 (1.0 m/s)
1996	Central American and Caribbean Junior Championships (U-20)	San Salvador, El Salvador	1st	4 × 100 m relay	40.11
1996	World Junior Championships	Sydney, Australia	28th (qf)	100m	11.12 (wind: -2.5 m/s)
1996	World Junior Championships	Sydney, Australia	29th (qf)	200m	21.91 (wind: -1.5 m/s)
1996	World Junior Championships	Sydney, Australia	9th (h)	4 × 100 m relay	40.31
1996	Ibero-American Championships	Medellín, Colombia	3rd	200 m	21.15 (-2.7 m/s)
1997	Central American and Caribbean Championships	San Juan, Puerto Rico	1st	4 × 100 m relay	39.18
1997	World Championships	Athens, Greece	4th	4 × 100 m relay	38.15
1998	Central American and Caribbean Games	Maracaibo, Venezuela	2nd	200 m	20.75
1998	Central American and Caribbean Games	Maracaibo, Venezuela	1st	4 × 100 m relay	38.79
1999	Pan American Games	Winnipeg, Canada	–	4 × 100 m relay	DNF
