= Charles Allen (hurdler) =

Canadian track and field athlete

Personal information
- Born: March 3, 1977 (age 49) Georgetown, Guyana

Sport
- Sport: Track and field
Medal record
Representing Canada
Commonwealth Games
Bronze medal – third place	2006 Melbourne	4x100m relay

Charles Tyrone Allen (born March 3, 1977) is a Canadian track and field athlete, specializing in hurdling and sprinting.

Born in Georgetown, Guyana, Allen emigrated to Canada, first to Brampton where he attended Turner Fenton Secondary School, and then to Malton where he went to Ascension of Our Lord Secondary School.

Allen represented Canada at the 1996 World Junior Championships in Athletics in the 100 and 200 metres. Representing the Clemson Tigers track and field team, Allen won the 1999 4 × 400 meter relay at the NCAA Division I Indoor Track and Field Championships.

He competed for Guyana in the 110 metres hurdles at the 2000 Summer Olympics, and still holds the Guyanese record in that event. By the time of the 2002 Commonwealth Games, Allen was again representing Canada.

At the 2004 Summer Olympics, Allen made the finals in the 110 m hurdles after setting a new personal best time in each of the qualifying rounds. He finished a respectable sixth, but in a slower time than he had hoped. He was also captain of Canada's 4 × 100 m relay team, but the team failed to pass the qualifying stages. At the 2006 Commonwealth Games in Melbourne, however, Allen won a bronze medal with the Canadian relay team.
