= Eric Milazar =

Mauritian sprinter (born 1975)

Personal information
- Nationality: Mauritian
- Born: 1 June 1975 (age 51) Rodrigues

Sport
- Sport: Running
- Events: 200 metres, 400 metres
Medal record
Men's athletics
Representing Mauritius
World Cup
Bronze medal – third place	2002 Madrid	4×400 metres
World Athletics Final
Bronze medal – third place	2003 Monaco	400 m
Golden League
Silver medal – second place	2003 Berlin	400 m
African Championships
Gold medal – first place	2000 Algiers	400 m
Gold medal – first place	2002 Radès	400 m
Gold medal – first place	2004 Brazzaville	400 m
Silver medal – second place	2000 Algiers	4×100 m
Silver medal – second place	2002 Radès	4×400 m
Bronze medal – third place	1996 Yaoundé	4×400 m
Bronze medal – third place	2002 Radès	4×100 m
Jeux de la Francophonie
Gold medal – first place	2009 Beirut	400 m
Silver medal – second place	2001 Ottawa	400 m
Bronze medal – third place	1997 Antananarivo	400 m

Jean Éric Milazar (born June 1, 1975) is a Mauritian athlete competing in the 200 metres and 400 metres. He was born in Rodrigues and currently resides in Coromandel, Mauritius. He is married to Natacha Ramen-Milazar since 2006 an ex volleyball player and together they have two kids Ericson and Erica.

He is the national record holder in the 400m (44.69), the 300m (32.57), the 200m indoor (21.24) and the 400m indoor (46.28). He also co-holds the Mauritian records in the 4 × 100 m relay (38.99) and the 4 × 400 m relay (3:06:21). Milazar also competes in the 200 metres and is the second fastest 200 metres sprinter in Mauritius with a time of 20.66 behind Stephan Buckland's 20.06. Milazar is one of the best sportsman in Mauritius and he has represented his country in numerous international athletics events such as the Olympic Games and the IAAF World Championships in Athletics. Milazar is one of the best 400m sprinters in Africa since he has won three consecutive African champion titles at the African Championships in 2000, 2002, 2004 and is the first African athlete in history to achieve that. He eventually reached the final in the 400m at the World Championships, in Edmonton, Alberta, Canada finishing fourth in a time of 45.13. Two years later, at the Paris World Championships, Milazar again reached the final finishing seventh in 45.17. However, the International Association of Athletics Federations (IAAF) promoted him to fifth place after the disqualification of Americans Jerome Young and Calvin Harrison due to doping offences. As such, Milazar won his semifinal race in a time of 44.75, the second best time of the semifinals behind Tyree Washington's 44.60.

After his return from the Paris World Championships, Milazar produced an impressive winning streak at the Indian Ocean Island Games in Mauritius. He won three gold medals and one silver. He finished first in the 400 metres smashing the Games' record clocking 45.78. He also won the 4 × 100 m and the 4 × 400 m relay. He finished second in the 200 metres behind Stephan Buckland. His time was 21.07 seconds.

In 2006, Eric Milazar got the Chikungunya disease which was a very serious pandemic in Mauritius. As a result, he became physically weak and his performances in the 400m were quite poor. He struggled at the 2006 African Championships and in the 2006 Commonwealth Games held in Melbourne, Australia. The following year was also a big struggle as he only finished fourth in the 400m heats at the 2007 World Athletics Championships in Osaka. But, these failures only encouraged him to train harder and gain his confidence back to start setting the track on fire again. This poor performance was overcome at the Indian Ocean Island Games held in Madagascar where Milazar won three gold medals in the 400m, 4 × 100 m and 4 × 400 m relay. He also won a silver medal in the 200 metres at these Games.

With strong wits and determination, Milazar bounced back at the Abuja CAA Super Grand Prix finishing third in 45.90 in 2008. He also achieved the standards needed to qualify for the Beijing Olympic Games but, did not pass the first round of the 400 metres.

In 2009, the Mauritian sprinter won a gold medal in the 400 metres at the Francophone Games held in Beirut, Lebanon. He achieved a time of 46.00 which was also his season's best. Moreover, he won a silver medal in the 4x100 relay and a bronze medal in the 4 × 400 m relay. As the captain of the Mauritian team, he demonstrated great sportsmanship during this international event which earned him the "Sportsman of the Year" award and a cash prize reward.

== Personal bests ==
Date	Event	Venue	Time (seconds)
8 August 2004	200 metres	La Chaux de Fonds, Switzerland	20.66
27 January 2006	200 metres indoor	Eaubonne, France	21.24 (National record)
12 June 2005	300 metres	Villeneuve d'Ascq, France	32.57 (National record)
7 July 2001	400 metres	Madrid, Spain	44.69 (National record)
2006	400 metres indoor	Aubière, France	46.28 (National record)
23 July 2001	4 x 100 metres relay	Edmonton, Canada	38.99 (National record)
9 July 1995	4 x 400 metres relay	Harare, Zimbabwe	3:06:21 (National record)

== IAAF World Rankings ==
Year	Month	Event	Ranking	Points
2000	December	400m	16th	1227
2001	December	400m	7th	1257
2002	December	400m	12th	1244
2003	December	400m	6th	1283
2004	December	400m	10th	1254
2005	December	400m	44th	1162
2006	December	400m	49th	1169
2008	December	400m	61st	N/A

== Awards ==
Year	Name	Award	Discipline
1998	Eric Milazar	Allsports Athlete Award of the Month (June)	Athletics
2000	Eric Milazar	Allsports Athlete Award of the Month (July)	Athletics
2001	Eric Milazar	Allsports Athlete Award of the Month (April)	Athletics
2002	Eric Milazar	Allsports Athlete Award of the Month (August)	Athletics
2002	Eric Milazar	National Sports Awards Sportsman of the Year	Athletics
2009	Eric Milazar	National Sports Awards Sportsman of the Year	Athletics

== All achievements in athletics ==
Year	Meeting	Venue	Result	Event	Time
1995	Championnats Nationaux	Réduit, Mauritius	1st	200 m	21.60
1995	Championnats Nationaux	Réduit, Mauritius	1st	400 m	46.80
1995	Championnats Nationaux	Réduit, Mauritius	1st	4 × 100 m	40.20
1995	Championnats Seychellois d'athletisme	Victoria, Seychelles	1st	400 m	46.83
1995	All-Africa Games	Harare, Zimbabwe	?	4 × 400 m	3:06.21(NR)
1996	Championnats Nationaux	Réduit, Mauritius	1st	400 m	48.71
1996	Atlanta Olympic Games	Atlanta, United States	4th	4 × 400 m Heat	3:08.17
1997	Championnats Nationaux	Réduit, Mauritius	1st	200 m	21.92
1997	Championnats Nationaux	Réduit, Mauritius	1st	400 m	48.10
1997	Championnats d'athletisme de Madagascar	Antananarivo, Madagascar	1st	200 m	21.50
1997	Championnats d'athletisme de Madagascar	Antananarivo, Madagascar	1st	400 m	47.10
1997	Southern African Meeting	Pretoria, South Africa	?	400m	47.45
1997	Southern African Meeting	Durban, South Africa	3rd	200m	21.30
1997	Francophone Games	Antananarivo, Madagascar	3rd	400m	46.67
1997	Francophone Games	Antananarivo, Madagascar	2nd	4 × 400 m	3:07:30
1998	All Africa Invitational Meeting	Johannesburg, South Africa	7th	400m	46.59
1998	Meeting Atletica di San Marino	San Marino City, San Marino	4th	400m	46.22
1998	Memorial Primo Nebiolo	Turin, Italy	3rd	400m	46.19
1998	Meeting Atletica Citta di Formia	Formia, Italy	3rd	400m	46.19
1998	Championnats d'athletisme du Senegal	Dakar, Senegal	1st	400m	46.14
1998	Memorial Giovanni Maria Idda	Ponzano Veneto, Italy	1st	400m	45.95 (MR)
1998	Meeting International de Dijon	Dijon, France	1st	400m	46.16
1998	Meeting d'athletisme de St Raphael	Saint-Raphaël, France	1st	200m	20.72
1998	Jeux des Iles de L'ocean Indien	Saint-Denis, Reunion	1st	400m	46.21
1998	Jeux des Iles de L'ocean Indien	Saint-Denis, Reunion	1st	4 × 400 m	3:08:31
1998	Championnats de France d'athletisme	Dijon, France	1st	400m Heat	46.16
1998	Championnats de France d'athletisme	Dijon, France	1st	400m Semifinal	45.47
1998	Championnats de France d'athletisme	Dijon, France	1st	400m Final	45.31
1998	Commonwealth Games	Kuala Lumpur, Malaysia	1st	200 m Heat	21.20
1998	Commonwealth Games	Kuala Lumpur, Malaysia	6th	200 m Quarterfinal	21.16
1998	Commonwealth Games	Kuala Lumpur, Malaysia	5th	4 × 100 m Qualification	39.71
1998	Commonwealth Games	Kuala Lumpur, Malaysia	7th	4 × 100 m Final	42.70
1998	Commonwealth Games	Kuala Lumpur, Malaysia	7th	4 × 400 m Heat	3:08:09
1999	Engen Grand Prix Summer Series	Roodepoort, South Africa	6th	400m	45.91
1999	Engen International Meeting	Pretoria, South Africa	3rd	400m	45.59
1999	Pietersburg Yellowpages Meeting	Pietersburg, South Africa	3rd	400m	45.53
1999	Meeting Internazionale Atletica di Caorle	Caorle, Italy	3rd	400m	45.94
1999	Meeting Atletica Leggera Viareggio	Viareggio, Italy	2nd	300m	33.12
1999	Meeting Internazionale Citta di Avellino	Avellino, Italy	2nd	400m	46.00
1999	Memorial Primo Nebiolo	Turin, Italy	2nd	400m	45.72
1999	Budapest International Meeting	Budapest, Hungary	2nd	400m	45.60
1999	St Denis Grand Prix II Meeting	Paris, France	2nd	400m	45.60
1999	Meeting Memorial Fallai	Conegliano Treviso, Italy	1st	400m	46.01
1999	Meeting Internazionale Padova	Padova, Italy	1st	400m	45.77
1999	Meeting International d'Abidjan	Abidjan, Ivory Coast	1st	400m	45.50h
1999	Lucozade International Sport Meeting	Réduit, Mauritius	1st	400m	46.42
1999	Meeting International Dakar	Dakar, Senegal	1st	200m	20.84
1999	Meeting International Dakar	Dakar, Senegal	1st	300m	33.00
1999	Championnats de France d'athletisme	Niort, France	1st	400m Heat	46.46
1999	Championnats de France d'athletisme	Niort, France	2nd	400m Semifinal	46.24
1999	Championnats de France d'athletisme	Niort, France	3rd	400m Final	45.54
1999	Zagreb Grand Prix	Zagreb, Croatia	3rd	400m	45.65
1999	IAAF World Athletics Championships	Seville, Spain	4th	400m Heat	45.90
1999	All Africa Games Athletics	Johannesburg, South Africa	2nd	400m Heat	46.52
1999	All Africa Games Athletics	Johannesburg, South Africa	5th	400m Semifinal	46.03
1999	All Africa Games Athletics	Johannesburg, South Africa	7th	400m Final	45.71
1999	All Africa Games Athletics	Johannesburg, South Africa	4th	4 × 100 m Qualification	40.19
1999	All Africa Games Athletics	Johannesburg, South Africa	5th	4 × 100 m Final	39.83
2000	Championnats d'athletisme du Senegal	Dakar, Senegal	1st	400m	47.34
2000	Mauritius International Meeting	Réduit, Mauritius	1st	400m	46.20
2000	Atletica Geneve EAP Meeting	Geneva, Switzerland	1st	400m	46.04
2000	Meeting Internazionale Citta Di Barletta	Barletta, Italy	1st	400m	45.87 (MR)
2000	KBC Night of Athletics	Heusden Zolder, Belgium	1st	400m	45.74
2000	Meeting Atletismo Internacional da Madeira	Madeira, Portugal	1st	400m	45.69
2000	African Athletics Championships	Algiers, Algeria	1st	400m	45.62
2000	African Athletics Championships	Algiers, Algeria	1st	4 × 100 m	40.07
2000	Meeting International Resisprint	La Chaux-de-Fonds, Switzerland	1st	400m	44.87
2000	Meeting International Nikaia	Nice, France	5th	400m	45.66
2000	Meeting National de Paris-Charlety	Paris, France	2nd	200m	20.99
2000	Meeting National de Strasbourg	Strasbourg, France	2nd	400m	45.75
2000	Pietersburg Yellowpages Meeting	Pietersburg, South Africa	2nd	400m	45.38
2000	Grand Prix Ciudad de México	Mexico City, Mexico	2nd	400m	45.31
2000	Meeting Pre-Olympic Warm up	Sydney, Australia	2nd	300m	32.79
2000	Sydney Olympic Games	Sydney, Australia	4th	400m Heat	45.66
2000	Sydney Olympic Games	Sydney, Australia	5th	400m Quarterfinal	45.52
2000	Sydney Olympic Games	Sydney, Australia	5th	4 × 100 m Heat	39.55
2001	Meeting International du Nord	Villeneuve-d'Ascq, France	2nd	400 m	47.03
2001	Meeting National de Strasbourg	Strasbourg, France	2nd	400 m	45.75
2001	San Sebastian Grand Prix	San Sebastian, Spain	2nd	400m	45.63
2001	Engen Grand Prix Meeting	Pretoria, South Africa	2nd	400m	45.66
2001	Engen Grand Prix Meeting	Roodepoort, South Africa	3rd	400m	45.49
2001	Engen Grand Prix Meeting	Stellenbosch, South Africa	3rd	400m	45.34
2001	Thessaloniki Olympic Meeting	Thessaloniki, Greece	3rd	400m	45.29
2001	Meeting Spitzen Leichtathletik	Lucerne, Switzerland	1st	400 m	45.56
2001	Mauritius International Meeting	Réduit, Mauritius	1st	400m	45.62(MR)
2001	Dakar International Meeting	Dakar, Senegal	1st	400m	46.68
2001	Meeting Internazionale Citta di Avellino	Avellino, Italy	1st	400m	45.01(MR)
2001	Funchal International Meeting	Funchal, Portugal	1st	400m	45.00(MR)
2001	Memorial Primo Nebiolo	Turin, Italy	1st	400m	44.90
2001	XIX Reunion de Atletismo Madrid	Madrid, Spain	2nd	400m	44.69 (NR)
2001	Francophone Games	Ottawa, Canada	1st	400 m Qualification	45.75
2001	Francophone Games	Ottawa, Canada	2nd	400 m Final	44.96
2001	Francophone Games	Ottawa, Canada	1st	4 × 100 m Qualification	39.54
2001	Francophone Games	Ottawa, Canada	1st	4 × 100 m Final	39.04
2001	IAAF World Athletics Championships	Edmonton, Canada	1st	400 m Heat	45.94
2001	IAAF World Athletics Championships	Edmonton, Canada	2nd	400 m Semifinal	44.92
2001	IAAF World Athletics Championships	Edmonton, Canada	4th	400 m Final	45.13
2001	IAAF World Athletics Championships	Edmonton, Canada	2nd	4 × 100 m Heat	38.99 (NR)
2001	IAAF World Athletics Championships	Edmonton, Canada	7th	4 × 100 m Semifinal	39.25
2001	All-Stars Afternoon	Réduit, Mauritius	1st	300m	33.21
2001	Goodwill Games	Brisbane, Australia	4th	400 m	45.65
2002	Engen Grand Prix Meeting	Pretoria, South Africa	2nd	400m	45.12
2002	Germiston Yellowpages Meeting	Germiston, South Africa	3rd	400m	45.81
2002	Engen Grand Prix Meeting	Cape Town, South Africa	2nd	400m	45.89
2002	Malser Sommer International Meeting	Mals, Italy	2nd	400m	45.53
2002	Grand Prix Reebok	San Sebastian, Spain	2nd	400m	45.41
2002	KBC Night of Athletics	Heusden-Zolder, Belgium	3rd	400m	46.34
2002	Championnats Nationaux Vital	Réduit, Mauritius	1st	400 m	46.64
2002	Air Mauritius International Meeting	Réduit, Mauritius	1st	400m	45.55 (MR)
2002	Meeting International Sonatrach	Blida, Algeria	1st	400m	45.80
2002	Meeting International d'Abidjan	Abidjan, Ivory Coast	1st	400m	46.26
2002	Meeting AAC Permit Nairobi	Nairobi, Kenya	1st	400m	45.39
2002	Meeting International Dakar	Dakar, Senegal	1st	200m	20.89
2002	Rome Golden GalaGolden League	Rome, Italy	7th	400m	45.44
2002	Zywiec Cup Area Permit Meeting	Poznan, Poland	4th	400m	45.57
2002	Norwich Union Grand Prix	Birmingham, England	5th	400 m	46.51
2002	Tofalia International Meeting	Patra, Greece	6th	400m	46.86
2002	Qatar Athletics Grand Prix	Doha, Qatar	6th	400m	46.21
2002	African Athletics Championships	Rades, Tunisia	1st	400m Heat	47.69
2002	African Athletics Championships	Rades, Tunisia	2nd	400m Semifinal	46.02
2002	African Athletics Championships	Rades, Tunisia	1st	400m Final	45.67
2002	African Athletics Championships	Rades, Tunisia	3rd	4 × 100 m Final	40.27
2002	African Athletics Championships	Rades, Tunisia	2nd	4 × 400 m Final	3:10:14
2002	Commonwealth Games	Manchester, England	1st	400 m Heat	47.31
2002	Commonwealth Games	Manchester, England	1st	400 m Quarterfinal	46.02
2002	Commonwealth Games	Manchester, England	2nd	400 m Semifinal	45.04
2002	Commonwealth Games	Manchester, England	6th	400 m Final	45.64
2002	Commonwealth Games	Manchester, England	6th	4 × 100 m Semifinal	40.05
2002	IAAF Athletics World Cup	Madrid, Spain	4th	400 m	45.41
2002	IAAF Athletics World Cup	Madrid, Spain	2nd	4 × 400 m	3:01:69
2003	Meeting in Dakar	Dakar, Senegal	1st	200 m	20.86
2003	Preparation meet, CIAD Dakar	Dakar, Senegal	1st	300 m	32.80
2003	Meeting in Dakar	Dakar, Senegal	1st	400 m	46.04
2003	Meeting International Bamako	Bamako, Mali	1st	200 m	20.82
2003	Air Mauritius International Meeting	Réduit, Mauritius	1st	400m	47.07
2003	Rabat International Meeting	Rabat, Morocco	1st	400m	45.89
2003	Championnats de France Elites d'Athletisme	Narbonne, France	1st	400 m Qualification	46.40
2003	Championnats de France Elites d'Athletisme	Narbonne, France	1st	400 m Final	45.28
2003	Meeting International Resisprint	La Chaux de Fonds, Switzerland	1st	400m	45.48
2003	Meeting Internazionale Citta di Avellino	Avellino, Italy	1st	400m	45.45
2003	4th Memorial Primo Nebiolo	Turin, Italy	1st	400 m	45.28
2003	C.D.S Assoluti Finale "A" Oro e Argento Italian Championships	Milan, Italy	1st	400 m	46.08
2003	C.D.S Assoluti Finale "A" Oro e Argento Italian Championships	Milan, Italy	3rd	200 m	20.79
2003	Engen Grand Prix Meeting	Durban, South Africa	3rd	400m	46.48
2003	DN Galan Grand Prix	Stockholm, Sweden	3rd	400 m	45.72
2003	Engen Grand Prix Meeting	Roodepoort, South Africa	2nd	400m	45.18
2003	ISTAF Golden League	Berlin, Germany	2nd	400 m	45.20
2003	Cena Slovenska Slovak Gold Grand Prix	Bratislava, Slovakia	2nd	400 m	45.46
2003	Meeting Spitzen Leichtathletik	Lucerne, Switzerland	2nd	400 m	45.56
2003	Meeting National La Roche-Sur-Yon	La Roche-Sur-Yon, France	2nd	200 m	21.30
2003	KBC Night of Athletics	Heusden-Zolder, Belgium	4th	400 m	45.41
2003	World Athletics Championships	Paris, France	2nd	400 m Heat	45.15
2003	World Athletics Championships	Paris, France	1st	400 m Semifinal	44.75 (SB)
2003	World Athletics Championships	Paris, France	5th	400 m Final	45.17
2003	Jeux des Iles de L'ocean Indien	Bambous, Mauritius	1st	400m Qualification	49.27
2003	Jeux des Iles de L'ocean Indien	Bambous, Mauritius	1st	400m Final	45.78(CR)
2003	Jeux des Iles de L'ocean Indien	Bambous, Mauritius	1st	200 m Qualification	21.79
2003	Jeux des Iles de L'ocean Indien	Bambous, Mauritius	2nd	200 m Final	21.07
2003	Jeux des Iles de L'ocean Indien	Bambous, Mauritius	1st	4 × 100 m Final	39.23(CR)
2003	Jeux des Iles de L'ocean Indien	Bambous, Mauritius	1st	4 × 400 m Final	3'10"84
2003	IAAF World Athletics Final	Monte Carlo, Monaco	3rd	400 m	45.67
2004	Dakar AAC International Meeting	Dakar, Senegal	3rd	400 m	46.10
2004	Bamako AAC International Meeting	Bamako, Mali	3rd	200 m	20.89
2004	Meeting International Resisprint	La Chaux de Fonds, Switzerland	1st	200m	20.66 (PB)
2004	Algiers International Meeting	Algiers, Algeria	1st	400 m	44.97
2004	Meeting Internazionale Citta Marano di Napoli	Naples, Italy	1st	400 m	45.48
2004	Meeting Internazionale Citta di Avellino	Avellino, Italy	1st	400 m	45.45
2004	Meeting National D1 de Strasbourg	Strasbourg, France	1st	400 m	45.42
2004	African Athletics Championships	Brazzaville, Congo	1st	400 m Heat	46.15
2004	African Athletics Championships	Brazzaville, Congo	1st	400 m Semifinal	45.35
2004	African Athletics Championships	Brazzaville, Congo	1st	400 m Final	45.03
2004	Championnats de France de Relais	Toulouse, France	1st	4 × 400 m	3:05.62
2004	Skyline International Meeting	Réduit, Mauritius	2nd	400 m	45.83
2004	5th Memorial Primo Nebiolo	Turin, Italy	2nd	400 m	45.54
2004	Meeting Lille Metropole	Lille, France	2nd	400 m	45.60
2004	Athletissima Super Grand Prix	Lausanne, Switzerland	3rd	400 m	45.25
2004	DN Galan Grand Prix	Stockholm, Sweden	8th	400 m	46.32
2004	Gaz De France Golden League	Paris, France	8th	400 m	46.40
2004	Athens Olympic Games	Athens, Greece	3rd	400 m Heat	45.34
2004	Athens Olympic Games	Athens, Greece	4th	400 m Semifinal	45.23
2004	IAAF World Athletics Final	Monte Carlo, Monaco	8th	400 m	46.66
2005	West African Championships	Dakar, Senegal	1st	400 m	46.32
2005	Meeting International Dakar	Dakar, Senegal	1st	200 m	20.99
2005	Meeting International Dakar	Dakar, Senegal	4th	400 m	46.15
2005	Meeting International Bamako	Bamako, Mali	2nd	200 m	20.70
2005	Skyline International Meeting	Réduit, Mauritius	1st	400 m	46.56
2005	Meeting Lille Metropole	Villeneuve D'ascq, France	4th	300 m	32.57 (NR)
2005	6th Memorial Primo Nebiolo	Turin, Italy	3rd	400 m	45.54
2005	Meeting Internazionale Citta di Avellino	Avellino, Italy	1st	400 m	45.80
2005	Championnats de France Interclubs N1A Hommes	Franconville, France	1st	400 m	46.05
2005	Championnats de France Interclubs N1A Hommes	Franconville, France	3rd	4 × 400 m	3:16.49
2005	Championnats de France de Relais	Obernai, France	4th	4 × 400 m	3:14.39
2005	Meeting International de Strasbourg	Strasbourg, France	2nd	400 m	45.73
2005	Sestriere Meeting Internazionale	Sestriere, Italy	2nd	300 m	32.70
2005	Golden Spike Zlata Tetra	Ostrava, Czech Republic	6th	400 m	47.08
2005	Helsinki GE Money Grand Prix	Helsinki, Finland	4th	400 m	46.19
2005	IAAF World Athletics Championships	Helsinki, Finland	4th	400 m Heat	45.91
2006	Soirée d'Eaubonne Indoor	Eaubonne, France	1st	200m Indoor	21.24
2006	IAAF Indoor Meeting Sparkassen Cup	Stuttgart, Germany	1st	400m Indoor	46.67
2006	Reunión Internacional Atletismo IAAF Permit	Valencia, Spain	1st	400m Indoor	46.91
2006	Meeting GE Galan Indoor	Stockholm, Sweden	2nd	400m Indoor	47.13
2006	Championnats de France en Salle	Aubiere, France	1st	400 m Qualification	47.40
2006	Championnats de France en Salle	Aubiere, France	1st	400 m Indoor	46.28 (NR)
2006	Match Reunion-Maurice Seniors D'athletisme	Saint-Denis, Réunion	1st	400m	45.61
2006	Match Reunion-Maurice Seniors D'athletisme	Saint-Denis, Réunion	1st	4 × 100 m	40.35
2006	Match Reunion-Maurice Seniors D'athletisme	Saint-Denis, Réunion	1st	4 × 400 m	3:12.49
2006	Meeting Gobierno de Aragon	Zaragoza, Spain	5th	400m	48.31
2006	Rome Golden Gala Golden League	Rome, Italy	8th	400m	45.97
2006	Meeting National D2 de Bonneuil sur Marne	Bonneuil-sur-Marne, France	2nd	400m	47.31
2006	Meeting Città di Lugano EAP Meeting	Lugano, Switzerland	2nd	400m	46.90
2006	CAA Grand Prix d'Algiers	Algiers, Algeria	2nd	400m	46.12
2006	Meeting National D2 de Metz	Longeville-lès-Metz, France	2nd	400m	45.58
2006	Aarhus Games	Aarhus, Denmark	2nd	400m	46.23
2006	Commonwealth Games	Melbourne, Australia	2nd	400m Heat	46.68
2006	Commonwealth Games	Melbourne, Australia	7th	400m Semifinal	46.48
2006	Commonwealth Games	Melbourne, Australia	5th	4 × 400 m Heat	3:08:19
2006	African Athletics Championships	Bambous, Mauritius	3rd	400m Heat	46.96
2006	African Athletics Championships	Bambous, Mauritius	7th	400m Semifinal	46.81
2006	African Athletics Championships	Bambous, Mauritius	4th	4 × 400 m Final	3:09.78
2007	Stellenbosch Yellow Pages Meeting	Stellenbosch, South Africa	5th	200 m	21.83
2007	Tshwane Yellow Pages Meeting	Tshwane, South Africa	7th	400 m	47.60
2007	Memorial Primo Nebiolo	Turin, Italy	4th	400 m	46.39
2007	Mauritius International Meeting	Réduit, Mauritius	1st	400 m	47.53
2007	Folksam Grand Prix	Sollentuna, Sweden	1st	400 m	46.92
2007	CAA Grand Prix	Algiers, Algeria	1st	400 m	46.48
2007	Southern Africa Regional Permit Meeting	Gaborone, Botswana	1st	400 m	46.46
2007	Meeting Internazionale Citta di Avellino	Avellino, Italy	1st	400 m	46.31
2007	Meeting Internazionale Citta di Pergine	Pergine Valsugana, Italy	1st	400 m	46.08
2007	Aarhus Games	Aarhus, Denmark	2nd	400m	46.91
2007	Gotegalan	Karlstad, Sweden	2nd	400 m	46.84
2007	Karlskrona Grand Prix	Karlskrona, Sweden	3rd	200 m	21.22
2007	Jeux des Iles de L'ocean Indien	Antannarivo, Madagascar	2nd	200 m Qualification	21.69
2007	Jeux des Iles de L'ocean Indien	Antannarivo, Madagascar	2nd	200 m Final	20.8
2007	Jeux des Iles de L'ocean Indien	Antannarivo, Madagascar	1st	400 m Qualification	48.00
2007	Jeux des Iles de L'ocean Indien	Antannarivo, Madagascar	1st	400 m Final	46.21
2007	Jeux des Iles de L'ocean Indien	Antannarivo, Madagascar	1st	4 × 100 m Final	39.51
2007	Jeux des Iles de L'ocean Indien	Antannarivo, Madagascar	1st	4 × 400 m Final	3.19.10
2007	All-Africa Games	Algiers, Algeria	3rd	400 m Heat	46.03
2007	All-Africa Games	Algiers, Algeria	4th	400 m Semifinal	46.29
2007	All-Africa Games	Algiers, Algeria	3rd	4 × 100 m Heat	39.92
2007	All-Africa Games	Algiers, Algeria	5th	4 × 100 m Final	39.64
2007	All-Africa Games	Algiers, Algeria	6th	4 × 400 m Heat	3:09:14
2007	IAAF World Championships in Athletics	Osaka, Japan	5th	400 m Heat	46.55
2008	Preparation Meeting (March 8)	Réduit, Mauritius	2nd	200 m	21.62
2008	Preparation Meeting (March 29)	Réduit, Mauritius	1st	400 m	47.94
2008	Preparation Meeting (April 25)	Réduit, Mauritius	1st	400 m	46.72
2008	Meeting International Tangiers	Tangiers, Morocco	1st	400 m	46.55 (MR)
2008	Meeting Internazionale Citta di Avellino	Avellino, Italy	1st	200 m	21.12
2008	Meeting Internazionale Citta di Avellino	Avellino, Italy	1st	400 m	46.25
2008	Meeting Internazionale Citta Marano di Napoli	Naples, Italy	1st	400 m	46.67
2008	Meeting National D1 Stanislas de Nancy	Nancy, France	1st	400 m	46.30
2008	Meeting National D2 de Metz	Longeville-lès-Metz, France	1st	400 m	46.04
2008	Mauritius International Meeting	Réduit, Mauritius	3rd	400 m	47.59
2008	Meeting Internazionale Terra Sarda	Arzana, Italy	3rd	400 m	46.82
2008	Sollentuna Grand Prix	Sollentuna, Sweden	5th	300 m	33.32
2008	Pedro's Cup	Szczecin, Poland	5th	400 m	47.15
2008	Memorial Primo Nebiolo	Turin, Italy	4th	400m	47.00
2008	Meeting Lagardere Athle Tour de Strasbourg	Strasbourg, France	4th	400 m	46.03
2008	Brazzaville CAA Grand Prix	Brazzaville, Congo	3rd	400 m	46.16
2008	Abuja Super Grand Prix	Abuja, Nigeria	3rd	400 m	45.90
2008	African Athletics Championships	Addis Ababa, Ethiopia	2nd	400 m Heat	47.02
2008	African Athletics Championships	Addis Ababa, Ethiopia	2nd	400 m Semifinal	46.48
2008	African Athletics Championships	Addis Ababa, Ethiopia	5th	400 m Final	45.96
2008	African Athletics Championships	Addis Ababa, Ethiopia	7th	4 × 400 m	3:07.60
2008	Beijing Olympic Games	Beijing, China	7th	400m Heat	46.06
2009	Germiston Yellowpages Series	Germiston, South Africa	7th	200m	21.24
2009	Germiston Yellowpages Series	Germiston, South Africa	2nd	4 × 100 m	39.72
2009	Meeting International de Tunis	Tunis, Tunisia	4th	400m	48.12
2009	Mauritius International Meeting	Réduit, Mauritius	2nd	400m	49.11
2009	Mauritius International Meeting	Réduit, Mauritius	2nd	4 × 100 m	41.98
2009	Folksam Grand Prix	Karlskrona, Sweden	5th	300m	33.32
2009	Meeting Stanislas de Nancy	Tomblaine, France	6th	400m	47.16
2009	Meeting Spitzen Leichtathletik	Lucerne, Switzerland	6th	400 m	47.47
2009	Meeting National D1 de Metz	Longeville-lès-Metz, France	2nd	400m	46.31
2009	Tofalia International Meeting	Patra, Greece	1st	400m	46.81
2009	Meeting International Resisprint	La Chaux de Fonds, Switzerland	1st	200m	21.03
2009	Meeting International Resisprint	La Chaux de Fonds, Switzerland	4th	400m	46.03
2009	Meeting Internazionale Citta di Velletri	Velletri, Italy	5th	400m	47.43
2009	Memorial Paolo Delogu	Nuoro, Italy	2nd	400m	46.94
2009	Meeting di Atletica Internazionale Sport Solidarieta	Sabbiadoro, Italy	3rd	400m	46.97
2009	IAAF World Athletics Championships in Athletics	Berlin, Germany	4th	400 m Heat	46.39
2009	Francophone Games	Beirut, Lebanon	1st	400m Qualification	47.58
2009	Francophone Games	Beirut, Lebanon	1st	400m Final	46.00
2009	Francophone Games	Beirut, Lebanon	2nd	4 × 100 m	39.60
2009	Francophone Games	Beirut, Lebanon	3rd	4 × 400 m	3:08:29
2009	Final Lucozade Sport National Circuit	Réduit, Mauritius	2nd	100m	10.66
2010	Preparation Meeting	Réduit, Mauritius	1st	400m	48.27
2010	Lucozade National Circuit	Réduit, Mauritius	1st	400m	47.95
2010	Lucozade National Circuit	Réduit, Mauritius	1st	4 × 100 m	41.07
2010	Meeting Yellowpages Series	Johannesburg, South Africa	7th	400m	48.55
2010	Mauritius International Meeting	Réduit, Mauritius	3rd	400m	47.01
2010	Meeting Internazionale Citta di Avellino	Avellino, Italy	3rd	400m	47.87
2010	Meeting Internazionale Citta Marano di Napoli	Naples, Italy	3rd	400 m	47.68
2010	Meeting National D1 Nantes	Nantes, France	3rd	200m	21.39
2010	Meeting Stanislas Nancy	Tomblaine, France	8th	200m	21.15
2010	Meeting Metz Moselle Athlelor	Metz, France	5th	400m	47.46
2010	Meeting International Resisprint	La Chaux de Fonds, Switzerland	5th	200m	21.12
2010	Meeting International Resisprint	La Chaux de Fonds, Switzerland	5th	400m	46.48
2010	Meeting Internazionale Citta di Pergine	Pergine Valsugana, Italy	1st	400m	47.10
2010	Memorial Francesco Bronzini	Sassari, Italy	1st	400m	47.05
2010	XXIII Memorial Giovanni Maria Idda	Ponzano Veneto, Italy	1st	400m	46.72
2010	Meeting Internazionale Assoluto Brugnera	Brugnera, Italy	N/A	800m	Pacemaker
2010	Meeting di Atletica Internazionale Sport Solidarieta	Lignano Sabbiadoro, Italy	N/A	800m	Pacemaker
2010	Meeting Internazionale Citta di Velletri	Velletri, Italy	N/A	800m	Pacemaker
2010	Meeting Internazionale Terra Sarda	Arzana, Italy	N/A	800m	Pacemaker
2010	Memorial Paolo Delogu	Nuoro, Italy	N/A	800m	Pacemaker
2010	Memorial Primo Nebiolo	Turin, Italy	N/A	800m	Pacemaker
2010	Meeting Internazionale Citta di Padova	Padova, Italy	N/A	800m	Pacemaker
2010	Rieti Grand Prix	Rieti, Italy	N/A	800m	Pacemaker
2010	Notturna di Milano	Milan, Italy	N/A	800m	Pacemaker
2010	African Athletics Championships	Nairobi, Kenya	3rd	400m Heat	46.97
2010	African Athletics Championships	Nairobi, Kenya	4th	400m Semifinal	46.79
2010	African Athletics Championships	Nairobi, Kenya	4th	200m Heat	21.40
2010	African Athletics Championships	Nairobi, Kenya	8th	200m Semifinal	21.50
2010	African Athletics Championships	Nairobi, Kenya	3rd	4 × 100 m Heat	40.00
2010	African Athletics Championships	Nairobi, Kenya	5th	4 × 100 m Final	40.27
2010	Commonwealth Games	Delhi, India	5th	200m Heat	21.46
2010	Commonwealth Games	Delhi, India	4th	200m Quarterfinal	21.41
2010	Commonwealth Games	Delhi, India	4th	4 × 100 m Heat	40.21
2010	Commonwealth Games	Delhi, India	5th	4 × 400 m Heat	3:15:78
2011	Preparation Meeting	Réduit, Mauritius	1st	200m	21.84
2011	Preparation Meeting (March 19)	Réduit, Mauritius	3rd	100m	10.94
2011	Mauritius International Meeting	Réduit, Mauritius	7th	400m	47.63
2011	Meeting International de St Denis	Saint-Denis, Réunion	1st	400m	47.21
2011	KFC National Juniors Championships Open Events	Réduit, Mauritius	1st	4 × 100 m (Mangalkhan SC Team)	40.77
2011	Meeting National D2 de Bonneuil sur Marne	Bonneuil-sur-Marne, France	4th	400m	48.39
2011	12th Meeting Internazionale Atletica di Primavera	Mondovi Cuneo, Italy	2nd	400m	47.49
2011	Meeting Internazionale Citta di Avellino	Avellino, Italy	2nd	400m	48.19
2011	Meeting du Val de Marne	Nogent-sur-Marne, France	3rd	200m	21.46
2011	Meeting National D1 Nant'Haies Atlantic	Nantes, France	4th	200m	21.82
2011	Championnats Ile-de-France Espoirs Seniors	Antony, France	1st	4 × 100 m	40.91
2011	Lucozade Sport Grand Prix Final	Réduit, Mauritius	1st	400m	47.15
2011	Jeux des Iles de L'ocean Indien	Mahe, Seychelles	1st	400m Qualification	48.11
2011	Jeux des Iles de L'ocean Indien	Mahe, Seychelles	2nd	400m Final	47.84
2011	Jeux des Iles de L'ocean Indien	Mahe, Seychelles	2nd	200 m Qualification	22.04
2011	Jeux des Iles de L'ocean Indien	Mahe, Seychelles	3rd	200 m Final	21.58
2011	Jeux des Iles de L'ocean Indien	Mahe, Seychelles	1st	4 × 100 m Final	40.49
2011	Jeux des Iles de L'ocean Indien	Mahe, Seychelles	2nd	4 × 400 m Final	3.14:20
2011	All-Africa Games Athletics	Maputo, Mozambique	5th	4 × 100 m Final	39.85
2011	All-Africa Games Athletics	Maputo, Mozambique	5th	200m Heat	22.26
2012	Championnats Nationaux Seniors Vital	Bambous, Mauritius	4th	200m	22.76
