= Marcus la Grange =

South African sprinter

Medal record

Men's athletics

Representing South Africa

African Championships
Bronze medal – third place	2002 Radès	400 m
Bronze medal – third place	2004 Brazzaville	4×400 m

Marcus la Grange (born 12 December 1977) is a South African sprinter who specialises in the 400 metres. His personal best time is 44.65 seconds, achieved in April 2002 in Pretoria. He competed in the 2004 Olympic Games, coming third in the first heat of the men's 400 metres, and was a member of the South African Men's 4 x 400 metres relay race.

== Competition record ==
Year	Competition	Venue	Position	Event	Notes
Representing South Africa
1996	World Junior Championships	Sydney, Australia	15th (sf)	100 m	10.79 (wind: -0.5 m/s)
1996	World Junior Championships	Sydney, Australia	10th (sf)	200 m	21.51 (wind: -2.9 m/s)
1996	World Junior Championships	Sydney, Australia	11th (h)	4 × 100 m relay	40.54
1998	Commonwealth Games	Kuala Lumpur, Malaysia	14th (sf)	200 m	21.05
1998	Commonwealth Games	Kuala Lumpur, Malaysia	4th	4 × 400 m relay	3:02.21
1999	World Championships	Seville, Spain	25th (qf)	200 m	20.81
1999	World Championships	Seville, Spain	6th	4 × 100 m relay	38.74 (NR)
1999	All-Africa Games	Johannesburg, South Africa	6th	200 m	20.86
1999	All-Africa Games	Johannesburg, South Africa	4th	110 m hurdles	13.94
2001	World Championships	Edmonton, Canada	24th (qf)	200 m	20.83
2001	World Championships	Edmonton, Canada	13th (sf)	400 m	45.44
2001	World Championships	Edmonton, Canada	10th (h)	4 × 400 m relay	3:01.70
2002	Commonwealth Games	Manchester, United Kingdom	10th (sf)	400 m	45.51
2002	Commonwealth Games	Manchester, United Kingdom	4th	4 × 400 m relay	3:01.83
2002	African Championships	Radès, Tunisia	3rd	400 m	45.95
2003	World Championships	Paris, France	18th (h)	400 m	45.68
2003	World Championships	Paris, France	9th (h)	4 × 400 m relay	3:03.05
2004	African Championships	Brazzaville, Congo	5th	400 m	45.74
2004	African Championships	Brazzaville, Congo	3rd	4 × 400 m relay	3:03.81
2004	Olympic Games	Athens, Greece	27th (h)	400 m	45.95
2004	Olympic Games	Athens, Greece	–	4 × 400 m relay	DNF
