= 1996 Central American and Caribbean Junior Championships in Athletics =

XII Central American and Caribbean Junior Championships
- Dates: 14–16 July
- Host city: San Salvador, El Salvador
- Level: Junior and Youth
- Events: 78 (41 junior, 37 youth)
- Participation: about 524 (293 junior, 231 youth) athletes from 20 nations

The 12th Central American and Caribbean Junior Championships was held in San Salvador, El Salvador, between 14–16 July 1996.

== Medal summary ==
Medal winners are published by category: Junior A, Male, Junior A, Female, and Junior B. Complete results can be found on the World Junior Athletics History website.

=== Male Junior A (under 20) ===
| Event | Gold | | Silver | | Bronze | |
|---|---|---|---|---|---|---|
| 100 metres (1.4 m/s) | Roy Bailey (JAM) | 10.52 | Oscar Meneses (GUA) | 10.69 | Dominic Demeritte (BAH) | 10.73 |
| 200 metres (1.0 m/s) | Misael Ortíz (CUB) | 21.04 | Dominic Demeritte (BAH) | 21.23 | Roy Bailey (JAM) | 21.25 |
| 400 metres | Rohan McDonald (JAM) | 46.67 | Avard Moncur (BAH) | 47.09 | Carlos Santa (DOM) | 47.19 |
| 800 metres | Rubén Ortiz (MEX) | 1:53.05 | Johan Valdéz (CUB) | 1:53.91 | Dwayne Miller (JAM) | 1:54.28 |
| 1500 metres | Mauricio Zapata (MEX) | 3:55.63 | Luis Arias (MEX) | 3:55.73 | Johan Valdéz (CUB) | 4:00.73 |
| 5000 metres | David Galindo (MEX) | 14:23.66 | Juan Peralta (MEX) | 14:41.32 | Roy Vargas (CRC) | 15:41.27 |
| 10,000 metres | David Galindo (MEX) | 29:59.00 | Francisco Mondragón (MEX) | 30:25.20 | Roy Vargas (CRC) | 31:49.80 |
| 3000 metres steeplechase | Yacel Noa (CUB) | 9:18.78 | Alexander Greaux (PUR) | 9:25.72 | Abel Medina (MEX) | 9:28.32 |
| 110 metres hurdles (1.8 m/s) | Yoel Hernández (CUB) | 14.16 | Carlos Patterson (CUB) | 14.22 | Stephen Jones (BAR) | 14.26 |
| 400 metres hurdles | Kurt Duncan (JAM) | 52.90 | Robín Osorio (CUB) | 53.79 | Edwin Esparra (PUR) | 54.01 |
| High jump | Ryan Chambers (JAM) | 2.05 | Luis Soto (PUR) | 2.05 | Joel López (MEX) | 2.00 |
| Pole vault | Amaury Fernández (CUB) | 4.80 | Makirk Ramos (PUR) | 4.70 | Arturo Perea (PUR) | 4.30 |
| Long jump | Joan Lino Martínez (CUB) | 7.46 | René Hernández (CUB) | 7.38 | Luis Soto (PUR) | 7.25 |
| Triple jump | Michael Calvo (CUB) | 16.47 | Allen Mortimer (BAH) | 16.40 | René Hernández (CUB) | 15.78 |
| Shot put | Ahville Black (JAM) | 14.20 | Ricardo Despaigne (CUB) | 13.73 | Jesús Martínez (MEX) | 13.56 |
| Discus throw | Frank Casañas (CUB) | 53.08 | Daikel Flores (CUB) | 51.96 | Ahville Black (JAM) | 47.26 |
| Hammer throw | Yosmel Montes (CUB) | 65.88 | Abdul Munguía (CUB) | 55.32 | Carlos Valencia (MEX) | 53.24 |
| Javelin throw | Yoverlandi Suárez (CUB) | 66.92 | Coyotito Gray (BAH) | 59.42 | Jonathan Ramírez (MEX) | 56.40 |
| Decathlon | José Moreno (CUB) | 6481 | Alexander Copello (CUB) | 6102 | Rolando Ubarri (PUR) | 5964 |
| 10,000 metres track walk | Arturo Chora (MEX) | 43:59.23 | Loisel Gutiérrez (MEX) | 45:49.11 | David Reyes (GUA) | 47:33.56 |
| 4 × 100 metres relay | Cuba; Joan Lino Martínez; Grabiel González; Martínez; Misael Ortíz | 40.11 | Jamaica; Roy Bailey; David Spencer; S. Newton; Russell Brown | 41.00 | Bahamas; Dominic Demeritte; Agarette Evans; Osbourne Moxey; Avard Moncur | 41.51 |
| 4 × 400 metres relay | Jamaica; Ainsley Waugh; Michael Campbell; Kurt Duncan; Rohan McDonald | 3:09.67 | Dominican Republic; Carlos Santa; Charly Reyes; Didris Contreras; Oscar Valdés | 3:13.99 | Puerto Rico; Luis Daniel Soto; Brian Arden; Jesús Feliciano; Miguel Cosme | 3:15.83 |

=== Female Junior A (under 20) ===
| Event | Gold | | Silver | | Bronze | |
|---|---|---|---|---|---|---|
| 100 metres (0.7 m/s) | Sonia Williams (ATG) | 11.49 | Saran Patterson (JAM) | 11.56 | Yoryet Frómeta (CUB) | 11.68 |
| 200 metres (0.6 m/s) | Sonia Williams (ATG) | 23.96 | Yoryet Frómeta (CUB) | 24.28 | Tanya Oxley (BAR) | 24.56 |
| 400 metres | Mairelín Fuentes (CUB) | 54.63 | Yudalis Díaz (CUB) | 54.87 | Sherlene Williams (BAR) | 55.45 |
| 800 metres | Mairelín Fuentes (CUB) | 2:08.80 | Ana Guevara (MEX) | 2:09.80 | Yanelis Lara (CUB) | 2:10.70 |
| 1500 metres | Yanelis Lara (CUB) | 4:30.10 | Mónica Martell (MEX) | 4:30.61 | Karla Betancourt (MEX) | 4:30.67 |
| 5000 metres | Mónica Martell (MEX) | 17:28.53 | Evelyn Rojas (CRC) | 17:36.03 | Fanny González (DOM) | 17:47.47 |
| 100 metres hurdles (0.8 m/s) | Katia Brito (CUB) | 14.00 | Nohadis Ferrera (CUB) | 14.54 | Ayanna Buchannon (JAM) | 14.77 |
| 400 metres hurdles | Yasnay Lescay (CUB) | 58.62 | Tanya Jarrett (JAM) | 59.51 | Nerelis Rodríguez (CUB) | 60.16 |
| High jump | Yasnay Lescay (CUB) | 1.80 | Yanisleidi Fernández (CUB) | 1.77 | Keisha Spencer (JAM) | 1.71 |
| Long jump | Dolette Blake (JAM) | 6.07 | Michelle Baptiste (LCA) | 5.99 | Niurka Barthelemy (CUB) | 5.76 |
| Triple jump | Rachel Spencer (CUB) | 12.89 | Yaquelín Iglesias (CUB) | 12.51 | Christine Brown (JAM) | 12.44 |
| Shot put | Misleydis González (CUB) | 14.54 | Antuanett Depestre (CUB) | 14.22 | Doris Thompson (BAH) | 13.98 |
| Discus throw | Yania Ferrales (CUB) | 48.54 | Yuneidis Bonne (CUB) | 46.26 | Doris Thompson (BAH) | 41.86 |
| Hammer throw | Violeta Guzmán (MEX) | 51.46 | Alberta González (MEX) | 40.00 | Selene Girón (DOM) | 33.22 |
| Javelin throw | Osleidys Menéndez (CUB) | 59.98 | Nora Bicet (CUB) | 53.64 | Marisela Robles (DOM) | 49.06 |
| Heptathlon | Sheila Acosta (PUR) | 4749 | Yudelis Castañeda (CUB) | 4699 | Yamilé Paumier (CUB) | 4605 |
| 5000 metres track walk | Abigail Sáenz (MEX) | 23:30.88 | Misleidis Vargas (CUB) | 24:36.12 | Mayra Estrada (PUR) | 27:21.33 |
| 4 × 100 metres relay | Cuba; Yudalis Díaz; Nohadis Ferrera; Katia Brito; Prometa | 46.25 | Puerto Rico; Colón; Heysha Ortíz; Jennifer Caraballo; Zuleika Almodóvar | 47.05 | Dominican Republic; Peña; Pérez; Santa Medina; Nivar | 47.37 |
| 4 × 400 metres relay | Jamaica; Mashire Harrison; Michelle Burgher; Tamara Edgar; Aleen Bailey | 3:41.99 | Mexico; Ana Guevara; Dulce María Cruz; Renata Pérez; Sheila Ramírez | 3:47.96 | Barbados; Tanya Oxley; Nathalie Smith; Julia Lewis; Sherlene Williams | 3:48.76 |

=== Male Junior B (under 17) ===
| Event | Gold | | Silver | | Bronze | |
|---|---|---|---|---|---|---|
| 100 metres (1.3 m/s) | Joseph Colville (CRC) | 10.92 | José Meneses (GUA) | 11.00 | Yoel Baéz (DOM) | 11.12 |
| 200 metres (-0.6 m/s) | Joseph Colville (CRC) | 22.09 | Jesús Torres (PUR) | 22.20 | José Meneses (GUA) | 22.22 |
| 400 metres | Carlon Harrison (JAM) | 48.62 | O'Neil Wright (JAM) | 49.38 | Santos Mercado (DOM) | 49.44 |
| 800 metres | Carlon Harrison (JAM) | 1:55.64 | Heleodoro Navarro (MEX) | 1:56.45 | Presley Cherubin (BAR) | 1:57.70 |
| 1500 metres | Heleodoro Navarro (MEX) | 4:05.39 | Omar Hermes (MEX) | 4:06.97 | Billy de Jesús (PUR) | 4:11.85 |
| 3000 metres | Marcelo Neri (MEX) | 9:07.30 | Freddy Velázquez (GUA) | 9:13.95 | Michel Sarría (CUB) | 9:14.86 |
| 2000 metres steeplechase | Omar Hermes (MEX) | 6:19.04 | Lenín Blanco (MEX) | 6:27.58 | Ángel Rivera (PUR) | 6:28.58 |
| 100 metres hurdles (2.0 m/s) | Quayne Baccas (JAM) | 13.52 | Dwight Thomas (JAM) | 13.69 | Danny Menjivar (ESA) | 14.17 |
| 400 metres hurdles | O'Neil Wright (JAM) | 54.03 | Miguel García (DOM) | 54.81 | Carlos Sánchez (MEX) | 54.95 |
| High jump | Kevin Cumberbatch (BAR) | 1.95 | Jürgen Hagerdorn (MEX) | 1.95 | Ariel Cintras (CUB) | 1.90 |
| Pole vault | William Gutiérrez (CUB) | 3.70 | | | | |
| Long jump | Maurice Clarke (BAR) | 7.21 | Aundre Edwards (JAM) | 7.10 | Dwight Barrett (JAM) | 7.09 |
| Triple jump | Maurice Clarke (BAR) | 13.90 | Alexis Fernández (CUB) | 13.87 | Julio Gloria (DOM) | 13.51 |
| Shot put | Manuel Repollet (PUR) | 15.60 | Luis Lora (MEX) | 15.24 | Víctor Bisbal (PUR) | 15.21 |
| Discus throw | Loy Martínez (CUB) | 47.58 | Juan Martínez (MEX) | 42.38 | Víctor Bisbal (PUR) | 40.48 |
| Hammer throw | Karel Falls (CUB) | 49.52 | Maikel Vidal (CUB) | 46.90 | Luis Vega (PUR) | 46.14 |
| Javelin throw | Elier Duharte (CUB) | 55.00 | Ruslan Salcedo (CUB) | 54.90 | Richard Rock (BAR) | 51.30 |
| Heptathlon | Alejandro Maldonado (PUR) | 4105 | Karim Baray (MEX) | 4023 | Jorge Galván (MEX) | 3948 |
| 5000 metres track walk | César Cuel (MEX) | 23:02.98 | Alejandro Reséndiz (MEX) | 23:04.34 | William Portillo (ESA) | 25:04.18 |
| 4 × 100 metres relay | Jamaica; Christopher McKenzie; Clarke; Dwight Thomas; Dwight Barrett | 42.39 | Puerto Rico; Luis Flores; Ayala; Jesús Torres; Gybson | 43.05 | Dominican Republic; Yoel Baéz de la Cruz; Miguel García; Rutinel | 43.36 |
| 4 × 400 metres relay | Jamaica; Carlon Harrison; Montique; O'Neil Wright; Aldwyn Sappleton | 3:20.59 | Puerto Rico; Luis Flores; Jairo Velázquez; Zayas; Jesús Torres | 3:26.24 | El Salvador; Francisco Yosihara; Juan Pablo Tutila; Manuel Umaña; Danny Menjivar | 3:34.68 |

=== Female Junior B (under 17) ===
| Event | Gold | | Silver | | Bronze | |
|---|---|---|---|---|---|---|
| 100 metres (0.7 m/s) | Aleen Bailey (JAM) | 11.75 | Marcia Dorsett (BAH) | 11.95 | Lucyann Richards (BAR) | 12.18 |
| 200 metres | Aleen Bailey (JAM) | 24.50 | Lucyann Richards (BAR) | 24.78 | Keisha Robb (JAM) | 24.95 |
| 400 metres | Keisha Downer (JAM) | 55.53 | Ronetta Smith (JAM) | 56.13 | Zolveik Ruíz (PAN) | 57.35 |
| 800 metres | Niuvis Pie (CUB) | 2:14.34 | Yaima Millares (CUB) | 2:16.31 | Fabiola Sáenz (MEX) | 2:16.48 |
| 1200 metres | Niuvis Pie (CUB) | 3:31.04 | Yaima Millares (CUB) | 3:34.96 | Fabiola Sáenz (MEX) | 3:40.04 |
| 100 metres hurdles (-0.2 m/s) | Yusleidis Chacón (CUB) | 14.25 | Natalie Dawkins (JAM) | 14.29 | Yanina Semanat (CUB) | 14.47 |
| 300 metres hurdles | Yaniuska Pérez (CUB) | 42.71 | Andrea Bliss (JAM) | 43.28 | Jaeli Najar (MEX) | 44.70 |
| High jump | Lizette Castillo (MEX) | 1.65 | Celly Martínez (MEX) | 1.65 | Shelly-Ann Gallimore (JAM) | 1.65 |
| Long jump | Andrea Bliss (JAM) | 5.49 | Mauralis Tachel (CUB) | 5.41 | Erika Escalante (MEX) | 5.25 |
| Shot put | Yaima Castro (CUB) | 12.55 | Tania Bell (CUB) | 11.70 | Rocío González (MEX) | 11.64 |
| Discus throw | Yaima Castro (CUB) | 38.02 | Mitzel Pérez (MEX) | 34.92 | Nahomy Pérez (PUR) | 34.80 |
| Javelin throw | Tania Bell (CUB) | 42.06 | Leida Paulino (DOM) | 39.70 | Karina Castañeda (MEX) | 35.28 |
| Pentathlon | Solángel Rubio (MEX) | 3243 | Damaris Diana (PUR) | 3158 | Dianelis Delís (CUB) | 3145 |
| 4000 metres Track Walk | Natalia García (MEX) | 21:31.1 | Vianey Pedraza (MEX) | 22:03.4 | Alejandra León (ESA) | 23:15.5 |
| 4 × 100 metres relay | Jamaica; Aleen Bailey; Keisha Robb; Kareecia Thompson; Veronica Campbell | 46.31 | Cuba; Yaniuska Pérez; Yusleidis Chacón; Yaniro; Miladis Lazo | 47.98 | Mexico; Amiel Ruíz; Erika Escalante; Ruth Grajeda; Astrid Stoopen | 48.21 |
| 4 × 400 metres relay | Jamaica; Keasha Downer; Robathon; Andrea Bliss; Ronetta Smith | 3:45.51 | Barbados; Sheena Gooding; Renee Layne; Lucy-Ann Richards; Letitia Gilkes | 3:55.00 | Mexico; Fabiola Sáenz; Michelle Barraza; Jaeli Najar; Ana Medina | 3:57.53 |

== Medal table (unofficial) ==
* Host nation (El Salvador)

| Rank | Nation | Gold | Silver | Bronze | Total |
|---|---|---|---|---|---|
| 1 | Cuba (CUB) | 33 | 26 | 11 | 70 |
| 2 | Jamaica (JAM) | 20 | 9 | 9 | 38 |
| 3 | Mexico (MEX) | 15 | 19 | 16 | 50 |
| 4 | Puerto Rico (PUR) | 3 | 8 | 12 | 23 |
| 5 | Barbados (BAR) | 3 | 2 | 7 | 12 |
| 6 | Costa Rica (CRC) | 2 | 1 | 2 | 5 |
| 7 | Antigua and Barbuda (ATG) | 2 | 0 | 0 | 2 |
| 8 | Bahamas (BAH) | 0 | 5 | 4 | 9 |
| 9 | Dominican Republic (DOM) | 0 | 3 | 9 | 12 |
| 10 | Guatemala (GUA) | 0 | 3 | 2 | 5 |
| 11 | Saint Lucia (LCA) | 0 | 1 | 0 | 1 |
| 12 | El Salvador (ESA)* | 0 | 0 | 4 | 4 |
| 13 | Panama (PAN) | 0 | 0 | 1 | 1 |
| Totals (13 entries) | | 78 | 77 | 77 | 232 |

== Participation (unofficial) ==
Anguilla and Aruba competed for the first time at the championships. Detailed result lists can be found on the World Junior Athletics History website. An unofficial count yields a new record number of about 524 athletes (293 junior (under-20) and 231 youth (under-17)) from about 20 countries:

- Anguilla (1)
- Antigua and Barbuda (4)
- Aruba (2)
- Bahamas (12)
- Barbados (18)
- British Virgin Islands (4)
- Costa Rica (53)
- Cuba (69)
- Dominican Republic (38)
- El Salvador (44)
- Guatemala (18)
- Honduras (6)
- Jamaica (57)
- (Mexico) México (111)
- Netherlands Antilles (5)
- Nicaragua (1)
- (Panama) Panamá (24)
- Puerto Rico (52)
- Saint Lucia (2)
- U.S. Virgin Islands (3)
