= Seun Ogunkoya =

Nigerian sprinter

Personal information
- Nationality: Nigerian
- Born: 28 December 1977 (age 48) Akure, Ondo State
- Height: 1.80 m (5 ft 11 in)
- Weight: 86 kg (190 lb)

Sport
- Sport: Running
- Event: Sprints

Achievements and titles
- Personal bests: 100m: 9.92 s (Johannesburg 1998); 200m: 20.50 s (Nice 1997)
Medal record
Men's athletics
Representing Nigeria
IAAF World Cup
Silver medal – second place	1998 Johannesburg	100 m
Bronze medal – third place	1998 Johannesburg	relay
African Championships
Gold medal – first place	1996 Yaoundé	100 m
Gold medal – first place	1998 Dakar	100 m
World Junior Championships
Silver medal – second place	1996 Sydney	100 m

Seun Ogunkoya (born 28 December 1977) is a Nigerian sprinter and two-time African Championships gold medalist over 100 metres.

== Career peak ==
He was born in Akure and is a cousin of Falilat Ogunkoya. He improved his personal bests from 10.43 seconds in 1995 to 10.15 seconds in April 1996 in Makurdi, at the 10th National Sports Festival, to 9.97 seconds in July 1997 in Formia. He thereby became the youngest sprinter to have broken the 10-second barrier at 19 years, 197 days, a record broken by Yohan Blake (19 years, 196 days). Ogunkoya stated that "it is natural to be aiming at the world record". His coach was Tony Osheku.

He competed at the 1996 Summer Olympics, where he was eliminated in quarter final in the 200 metres, before winning a silver medal in the 100 metres at the 1996 World Junior Championships the next month. In 1997 he reached the quarter-final at the 1997 World Championships. In the relay at the 1997 World Championships, four others participated on the Nigerian team, and ended up taking the silver medal.

Ogunkoya won the 100 metres race at the 1996 African Championships and became Nigerian champion in 1996 and 1997. In 1998 he won the Weltklasse Zürich meet with 9.96 seconds, a new personal best, before winning the 1998 African Championships in another personal best, and championship record, of 9.94 seconds. In September he finished fourth at the IAAF Grand Prix Final before winning the silver medal at the 1998 World Cup. Here he improved his personal best time to 9.92 seconds, which was also his lifetime best, as well as a Nigerian record. He also won a bronze medal in the 4 x 100 metres relay, with the African team.

He also set personal bests of 20.50 seconds in the 200 metres, achieved in July 1997 in Nice, and 6.52 seconds in the 60 metres, achieved in February 1998 in Budapest.

== Later career and life ==
Ogunkoya ran in 10.27 seconds as a season's best in 1999. In July 2000, he ran in 10.23 seconds in Lagos. In the same year he was named for the Olympic squad, but fell through with an eighth and last place in his 100 metres heat. He moved to Prague where he recorded a 10.72 second race in June 2003.

Ogunkoya's has since moved his career up by training young sprinters in Ondo State and has become a motivation hero leading the less privileged and young boys and girls for a better sport career. Although the death of his mother took a toll on him, after few months he bounced back to encourage others.
