= Elston Cawley =

Jamaican sprinter

Personal information
- Nationality: Jamaican
- Born: 24 June 1976 (age 50)
- Height: 184 cm (6 ft 0 in)
- Weight: 90 kg (198 lb)

Sport
- Sport: Sprinting
- Event: 200 metres

Elston Cawley (born 24 June 1976) is a Jamaican sprinter. He competed in the men's 200 metres at the 1996 Summer Olympics.

Cawley competed for the UT Arlington Mavericks track and field team in the NCAA.
