= Alessandro Attene =

Italian sprinter (born 1977)

Personal information
- Nationality: Italian
- Born: 10 September 1977 (age 48) Recanati, Italy
- Height: 1.83 m (6 ft 0 in)
- Weight: 75 kg (165 lb)

Sport
- Country: Italy
- Sport: Athletics
- Event: Sprint
- Club: G.S. Fiamme Azzurre

Achievements and titles
- Personal bests: 100 m: 10.33 (2005); 200 m: 20.57 (1997); 200 m indoor: 20.94 (2001); 400 m: 45.35 (2000)
Medal record
Event	1st	2nd	3rd
Summer Universiade	0	0	1
Mediterranean Games	1	1	0
European U23 Championships	0	1	0
Summer Universiade
Bronze medal – third place	1999 Palma de Mallorca	4x400 m relay
Mediterranean Games
Gold medal – first place	2005 Almeria	4x400 m relay
Silver medal – second place	2005 Almeria	200 m
European U23 Championships
Silver medal – second place	1997 Turku	200 m

Alessandro Attene (born 10 September 1977 in Recanati, Province of Macerata) is a retired Italian sprinter who specialized in the sprint.

== Biography ==
He won four medals (three at senior level), at the International athletics competitions, two of these with national relays team. His personal best time is 45.35 seconds, achieved in the heats of the 2000 Summer Olympics in Sydney. He also competed at the 1997 and 2001 World Championships, the 2001 World Indoor Championships and the 2002 European Championships without ever reaching the final. He did win a silver medal in the 200 metres and gold medal in the relay 4x100 at the 2005 Mediterranean Games. He participated in the Summer Olympics in 2000, he has 16 caps in national team from 1994 to 2005.

== Achievements ==
Year	Competition	Venue	Position	Event	Notes
Representing Italy
1996	World Junior Championships	Sydney, Australia	12th (sf)	200m	21.53 (wind: -2.9 m/s)
1996	World Junior Championships	Sydney, Australia	6th	4 × 100 m relay	40.18
1997	European U23 Championships	Turku, Finland	2nd	200m	20.68 (wind: 0.3 m/s)
1997	European U23 Championships	Turku, Finland	4th	4 × 100 m relay	39.71
1997	European U23 Championships	Turku, Finland	7th	4 × 400 m relay	3:08.00
2000	Olympic Games	Sydney, Australia	15th (sf)	400 m	46.41

== National titles ==
He has won times the individual national championship three times.

- 1 win in the 200 metres (2004)
- 2 wins in the 200 metres indoor (2001, 2002)

== See also ==
- Italian all-time lists - 400 metres
- Italy national relay team
