= Lindel Frater =

Jamaican sprinter (born 1977)

Personal information
- Born: 13 November 1977 (age 48) Trelawny, Jamaica
- Height: 1.70 m (5 ft 7 in)
- Weight: 64 kg (141 lb)

Sport
- Sport: Running
- Events: 60 metres, 100 metres
- College team: TCU Horned Frogs
Medal record
Representing Jamaica
Men's Athletics
CARIFTA Games (Under-20s)
Gold medal – first place	1995 George Town	100 m
Gold medal – first place	1995 George Town	4x100m relay
Gold medal – first place	1996 Kingston	100 m

Lindel Frater (born 13 November 1977 in Trelawny, Jamaica) is a former sprinter who specialised in the 60 metres and 100 metres events.

He competed at the 2000 Olympic Games, reaching the semi-finals in the 100 m and finishing fourth in the 4 × 100 metres relay as part of the Jamaican team which broke the national record. He also competed in the 100 m at the 2001 World Championships, dropping out at the heat stage, and in the 60 m at the 2003 World Indoor Championships, where he reached the semi-finals.

He is the brother of Michael Frater who holds the world record in the 4 × 100 m relay event. He stated that Lindel "is like the biggest influence in my life in terms of track and field. He was there before anyone else and I looked up to him".

== Career ==
=== 1995 ===
Frater won the 100 m at the CARIFTA Games, in the Under-20 category. His winning time was 10.60.

=== 1996 ===
Frater successfully defended his 100 m title at the CARIFTA Games, winning in 10.50.

=== 1998 ===
Running for Tarleton State, Frater won the 100 m at the NCAA Division II Track & Field Championships, posting 10.37 into a -1.2 m/s headwind. He received All-American awards for the 100 m and 200 m. He won the Lone Star Conference Championship in the 100 m and 200 m, setting school records of 10.12 and 20.58 respectively and was awarded the title of Lone Star Conference Most Outstanding Track Athlete.

=== 2000 ===
Competing at the NCAA Division I Indoor Championships for Texas Christian University in March, Frater finished third in the 60 m.

At the June NCAA Division I Outdoor Championships, Frater recorded a personal best 10.07 in the 100 m semi-final. He finished fourth in the final by one hundredth of a second, posting 10.20.

At the Sydney Olympics, Frater finished eighth in the first semi-final, running 10.43. Frater ran the first leg of the 4 × 100 m relay, his team setting a new National Record of 38.27 in the semi-final. In the final he ran the first leg and the team set another new National Record of 38.20 but finished fourth.

=== 2001 ===
Frater was the 100 m Jamaica National Champion.

Frater was eliminated in the heats of the 100 m at the World Championships in Edmonton, running 10.57 into a -0.3 m/s headwind.

=== 2003 ===
At the World Indoor Championships Frater was eliminated in the 60 metres semi-finals, finishing fourth in his heat in 6.69.

=== End of career ===
Injury forced Frater into early retirement in 2003. He had severe tendinitis in both knees. Frustrated by the inability to heal, Frater retired from competitive running. He now lives in Dallas, Texas.

== Personal bests ==
Event	Time (seconds)	Venue	Date
55 metres	6.24	Reno, Nevada, United States	24 February 2001
60 metres	6.61	Colorado Springs, United States	12 February 1999
100 metres	10.07	Durham, North Carolina, United States	2 June 2000
200 metres	20.66	Shizuoka, Japan	3 May 2003

All information taken from IAAF profile.
