= Malik Louahla =

Algerian sprinter (born 1977)

Personal information
- Born: 19 December 1977 (age 48) Algiers, Algeria

Sport
- Sport: Track and field
Medal record
Representing Algeria
Mediterranean Games
Gold medal – first place	1997 Bari	4 × 400 m relay
Gold medal – first place	2001 Tunis	400 m
Silver medal – second place	2001 Tunis	4 × 400 m relay
African Championships
Gold medal – first place	2000 Algiers	4×400 m
Silver medal – second place	2000 Algiers	400 m

Malik Khaled Ahmed Louahla (Arabic:مالك خالد أحمد الواحلة; born 19 December 1977) is an Algerian sprinter, he specializes in the 200 and 400 metres.

In the 400m heats at the 2001 World Championships, Louahla ran a career best of 45.13 seconds. The following day, he ran a time of 45.14 seconds, but was eliminated from the competition in the semi-final. His personal best 200m time is 20.62 seconds, achieved in August 2004 in Algiers.

== Competition record ==
Year	Competition	Venue	Position	Event	Notes
Representing Algeria
1996	World Junior Championships	Sydney, Australia	33rd (h)	100 m	10.82
1996	World Junior Championships	Sydney, Australia	30th (qf)	200 m	22.06
1997	Mediterranean Games	Bari, Italy	1st	4 × 400 m relay	3:02.78
1997	World Championships	Athens, Greece	51st (h)	200 m	21.31
1997	World Championships	Athens, Greece	13th (h)	4 × 400 m relay	3:05.22
1997	Universiade	Catania, Italy	–	100 m	DQ
1997	Universiade	Catania, Italy	14th (sf)	200 m	21.27
1999	World Indoor Championships	Maebashi, Japan	21st (h)	200 m	21.24 (iNR)
1999	Military World Games	Zagreb, Croatia	1st	200 m	20.96
1999	World Championships	Seville, Spain	51st (h)	200 m	21.21
2000	African Championships	Algiers, Algeria	2nd	400 m	45.78
2000	African Championships	Algiers, Algeria	1st	4 × 400 m relay	3:05.45
2000	Olympic Games	Sydney, Australia	35th (h)	400 m	46.06
2000	Olympic Games	Sydney, Australia	–	4 × 400 m relay	DQ
2001	Mediterranean Games	Radès, Tunisia	1st	400 m	45.56
2001	Mediterranean Games	Radès, Tunisia	2nd	4 × 400 m relay	3:07.50
2001	World Championships	Edmonton, Canada	9th (sf)	400 m	45.14
2003	World Championships	Paris, France	37th (h)	400 m	46.22
2004	Olympic Games	Athens, Greece	27th (qf)	200 m	20.93
2004	Pan Arab Games	Algiers, Algeria	2nd	200 m	20.84
2005	Mediterranean Games	Almería, Spain	5th	200 m	21.15
2006	African Championships	Bambous, Mauritius	4th	400 m	45.69
2007	All-Africa Games	Algiers, Algeria	4th	4 × 400 m relay	3:05.32
