= Omar Sacco =

Italian bobsledder (born 1977)

Personal information
- Nationality: Italian
- Born: 3 February 1977 (age 48); Caserta, Italy

Sport
- Sport: Bobsleigh

Omar Sacco (born 3 February 1977) is an Italian former bobsledder. He competed in the four man event at the 2006 Winter Olympics.
