= Paul Brizzel =

Irish sprinter

Personal information
- Nationality: Irish
- Born: 3 October 1976 (age 49)

Sport
- Sport: Sprinting
- Event: 100 metres

Paul Brizzel (born 3 October 1976) is an Irish sprinter. He competed in the men's 100 metres at the 2000 Summer Olympics.
