= David Baxter (sprinter) =

Australian sprinter (1977–2010)

Personal information
- Born: David Scott Baxter; 27 March 1977 Melbourne, Australia
- Died: 2 July 2010 (aged 33)

Sport
- Country: Australia
- Sport: Athletics
- Event: Sprinting
Medal record
Commonwealth Games
Bronze medal – third place	2002 Manchester	4x100 m

David Scott Baxter (27 March 1977 – 2 July 2010) was an Australian athlete who competed as a sprinter.

== Biography ==
Born in the Melbourne suburb of Ivanhoe, Baxter was one of five children born to Norman and Gillian Baxter. He attended Ivanhoe Grammar School and trained at Doncaster Little Athletics.

In 1996, after winning the 100m and 200m national under-20 titles, Baxter represented Australia at that year's World Junior Championships and was a member of the 4 × 100 metres relay team which won a bronze medal.

Baxter competed at the 1998 IAAF World Cup, 1999 IAAF World Indoor Championships, 2001 Goodwill Games and in two editions of the World University Games. Most notably in 2002, he won a bronze medal at the Commonwealth Games in Manchester in the 4 × 100 metres relay. He had a personal best in the 100 metres of 10.30 seconds.

A medical doctor, Baxter was a graduate of the University of Melbourne and also studied at Oxford University, where his areas of interest were trauma and orthopaedic surgery. He held a research position at the Karolinska Institute in Sweden and was studying for a PhD at Monash University before his death from melanoma in 2010.
