= Petrov (surname) =

Petrov (Russian: Петров; pronounced [p] or [pʲɪˈtrof]; feminine: Petrova, Russian: Петрова) is one of the most common surnames in Russia and Bulgaria. It can be occasionally transcribed as Petrof of Petroff. It is a patronymic surname derived from the first name Pyotr (Пётр, Russian) or Petar (Петър, Bulgarian) (Slavic forms of the Greek name of the Christian apostle, in English Peter). Notable people with the surname include:

- Aleksandr Petrov (disambiguation), also Alexander, multiple persons
- Aleksei Petrov (disambiguation), also Aleksey, Alexei, Alexey, multiple persons
- Andrey Petrov (1930–2006), Russian composer
- Antonina Petrova (1915–1941) partisan and Heroine of the Soviet Union
- Boris Petrov
- Božo Petrov (born 1979), Croatian politician
- Daniel Petrov (born 1971), Bulgarian boxer
- Dmitry Petrov (disambiguation), multiple persons
- Evdokia Petrova (1915–2002), Soviet spy, wife of the Soviet diplomat who defected to Australia
- Galina Petrova (1920–1943), medic and Heroine of the Soviet Union
- Georgi Petrov, several people
- Gjorche Petrov (1864/1865–1921), Bulgarian revolutionary
- Grigory Spiridonovich Petrov (1866–1925), Russian priest and publicist
- Igor Petrov (1933–2020), Soviet and Russian naval officer
- Ihor Petrov (born 1964), Soviet and Ukrainian football player and coach
- Ivailo Petrov (1923–2005), Bulgarian writer
- Ivan Petrov (disambiguation), multiple persons
- Ivanka Petrova (1951–2007), Bulgarian shot putter
- Kamelia Petrova (born 2006), Bulgarian rhythmic gymnast
- Kirill Petrov (born 1990), Russian ice hockey player
- Konstantin Petrov, Ukrainian physicist
- Kuzma Petrov-Vodkin (1878–1939), Russian/Soviet painter
- Kyrylo Petrov (born 1990), Ukrainian footballer
- Lyudmila Petrova (born 1968), Russian long-distance runner
- Maya Petrova (born 1982), Russian Olympic champion in handball
- Maria Petrova (disambiguation), multiple persons
- Martin Petrov (born 1979), Bulgarian footballer
- Mikhail Petrov (disambiguation), multiple persons
- Nadia Petrova (born 1982), Russian professional tennis player
- Nikolay Petrov, multiple people
- Nina Petrova (1893–1945), female Red Army sniper credited with 122 kills
- Oleg Petrov (disambiguation), multiple persons
- Olga Petrova (1884–1977), stage name of Muriel Harding, an English-born American vaudeville performer
- Osip Petrov (1806–1878), Russian opera singer
- Petar Petrov, several people
- Pyotr Nikolayevich Petrov (1827–}1891), Russian historian and writer
- Pyotr Mikhailovich Petrov (1910–1941), Soviet flying ace
- Serhiy Petrov (1997–2026), Ukrainian footballer
- Stanislav Petrov (1939–2017), Russian colonel who averted a potential nuclear exchange
- Stefka Petrova (born 1950), Bulgarian nutritionist
- Stiliyan Petrov (born 1979), Bulgarian footballer
- Tatiana Petrova (born 1973), Russian water polo player
- Tatyana Petrova (born 1983), Russian runner
- Tetiana Petrova (born 1993), Ukrainian freestyle skier
- Todor Petrov (born 1960), Macedonian politician
- Tonka Petrova, Bulgarian middle-distance runner
- Totka Petrova (born 1956), Bulgarian middle-distance runner
- Tudor Petrov-Popa (born 1963), Moldovan Romanian politician
- Vadim Petrov (1932–2020), Czech composer
- Vadym Petrov (born 1995), Ukrainian football player
- Valeri Petrov (1920–2014), Bulgarian poet
- Valeriy Petrov, (1955–2022) Ukrainian football coach
- Vasily Petrov (disambiguation), multiple people
- Vasil Petrov (born 1986), Bulgarian football manager
- Velislava Petrova-Chamova, Bulgarian politician
- Victor Petrov, Soviet spy, Ukrainian emigrant activist, writer, philosopher and historian
- Vitaly Petrov (born 1984), Russian car racing driver
- Vitaly Petrov (coach), Ukrainian athletics coach
- Vladimir Petrov (disambiguation), multiple people
- Vyacheslav Petrov (born 1969), Russian politician
- Yevgeny Petrov (disambiguation), multiple people
- Zakhar Petrov (born 2002), Russian canoeist

== Fictional characters ==
- Aleksander Petrov, character from the Australian soap opera Neighbours
- Guardian Alberta Petrov, character from the book series Vampire Academy
- Katerina Petrova, character from the television series The Vampire Diaries
- Katya Petrova, character from the television series Melrose Place
- Mrs. Petrov, character from computer game Nancy Drew: Curse of Blackmoor Manor
- Nadia Petrova, character from the television series The Vampire Diaries
- Petrova Fossil, character from the novel Ballet Shoes by Noel Streatfeild
- Pigtail Petrova, character from the film The Bad Guys 2
- Viktor Petrov, the fictional President of Russia in the Netflix series House of Cards.

== See also ==
- Petrov (disambiguation)
