= Aleksandr Petrov =

Aleksandr or Aleksander or Alexander Petrov may refer to:

== Arts and entertainment ==
- Aleksandr Petrov (animator) (born 1957), Russian animator famous for using paint-on-glass animation
- Alexander Petrov (actor) (born 1989), Russian actor
- Aleksander Petrov, character from the Australian soap opera Neighbours
- Alexander Petrov, fictional character from DC Comics

== Politicians ==
- Alexander Petrov (politician) (born 1958), Russian politician
- Alexander Mishkin (born 1979), Russian spy and military doctor who used the alias Alexander Petrov
- Alexander Petrov (hacker), Russian hacker

== Scientists ==
- Alexander G. Petrov (born 1948), Bulgarian professor in physics

== Sportspeople ==
=== Association football ===
- Aleksandr Petrov (footballer, born 1893) (1893–1942), Russian football striker
- Aleksandr Petrov (footballer, born 1925) (1925–1972), Soviet Russian football midfielder
- Aleksandr Petrov (footballer, born 1984), Russian football forward
- Alexander Petrov (footballer, born 1990), Russian football midfielder

=== Other sports ===
- Alexander Petrov (chess player) (1794–1867), Russian chess master
- Aleksandr Petrov (wrestler) (1876–1941), Russian wrestler at the 1908 Olympic Greco-Roman super heavyweight competition
- Aleksandr Petrov (basketball) (1939–2001), member of the silver-medal-winning Soviet Olympic basketball team in 1960 and 1964
- Aleksandr Petrov (long jumper) (born 1986), Russian athlete
- Alexander Petrov (figure skater) (born 1999), Russian figure skater
- Aleksander Petrov (sprinter), Bulgarian athlete
