= Anatoly Zatin =

Russian composer

Anatoly Zatin, also spelled Anatoli Zatine (Russian: Анатолий Борисович Затин; born 23 March 1954, Uzhhorod, Ukrainian SSR), is a composer, pianist, orchestral conductor and pedagogue. Born in the USSR, he acquired Mexican citizenship in 1996.

== Education ==
Born into a musical family, Zatin began his music education at age 3. In 1968 he won first prize at a competition for young composers and pianists in Kiev. In 1979, Zatin joined the USSR Union of Composers and the St Petersburg Union of Composers.

== Professional career ==
Zatin taught at the Modest Mussorgsky Music College in Leningrad, and upon graduating from the conservatory in 1981 served as faculty of composition, orchestration and chamber music at the Leningrad Conservatory (1981–1983).

Since 1992, Zatin lives and works in Mexico. He taught at the University of Guadalajara in 1991–2001 and founded the Anatoly Zatin International Music Academy (AIMAZ) in Guadalajara, Jalisco, in 1996. Since 2001 he is professor at the University of Colima, where he coordinated the music department in 2001–2011 and served as dean at the Fine Arts Institute (IUBA) in 2011–2016.

In 2003, with pianist Vlada Vassilieva, Zatin founded Duo Petrof. In 2008, Zatin was named Petrof Artist internationally.

Zatin has collaborated with such musicians as Timofei Dokschitzer, Vitaly Buyanovsky, Vladimir Kafelnikov, Onorio Zaralli, Ravil Martynov, Vladimir Viardo, Dmitri Bashkirov, Jean Dubé and Shigeyuki Takano.

Zatin was awarded the prestigious Mozart Medal in 2015 and the UNICEF Medal of Honour in 1990 for his activities as pianist and conductor. He has toured Sweden, Norway, Finland, among other countries.

== Works ==
Concertos:

- Triple concerto for French Horn, Trumpet, Piano and Orchestra
- Double concerto for Flute, Harpsichord and Orchestra
- Double concerto for Trumpet, Piano and Strings
- Rhapsody for Piano and Orchestra on themes by Nino Rota

Opera/Musical:

- Беспечный Гражданин / “Careless Citizen” (Musical Scenes)
- Кошмарные Сновидения в Херсонской Губернии / “Terrible Nightmares in the Kherson province” (Opera Buffa)
- Любовь до гроба / “Love to death” (Musical Spectacle)

Ballet:

- Вождь Краснокожих / “The Ransom of Red Chief”
- Фея / “The Fairy”

Piano Solo:

- Sonata nº. 1
- Sonata nº. 2 ("Shadows")
- “Paganini" Fantasy in 6 etudes
- Poem (2006)
- 3 Pieces: Invention, Funeral Music, Dance
- Variations for piano
- Preludes

Orchestral:

- Symphony
- Concerto for Orchestra
- Music for Orchestra

Ensemble:

- “Dedication” for violin ensemble
- “Melody” for cello ensemble
- Sonata for French Horn and Piano
- Sonata for Viola and Piano
- Polka for piano 4 hands and whistle (also for string quintet and piano 4 hands)
- Suite from Sergei Slonimsky's ballet Icarus for 2 pianos (2008)
- Jarabe Tapatio for two pianos (2010)
- Hexameron for 2 pianos, 12 hands (after Franz Liszt, 2011).
- Pictures at an Exhibition (after Mussorgsky) for 2 pianos (2019).

Vocal Music:

- Веселые Истории/ “Fun Stories” cantata for children's choir
- Romances

Cinema:

- Воздушный хоровод / “Aerial Dance” (I. Trachtengerz, Russia).
- Водная фантазия / “Water Fantasy” (I. Trachtengerz, Russia).
- Опасный человек / “Dangerous Person” (I. Shadkhan, Russia, 1988).
- Abril, el mes más cruel / “Abril, the cruelest month” (Boris Goldenblanc, Mexico, 1993).

Works for other instruments:

- 3 Etudes for Violoncello
