= Petrof (disambiguation) =

Petrof is a Czech piano manufacturer.

Petrof may also refer to:

== Surname ==
- Antonín Petrof, founder of Petrov
- Ivan Petrof, an American explorer of Alaska

== Other ==
- Duo Petrof
- Petrof Bay, a bay in southeastern Alaska

== See also ==
- USS Petrof Bay (CVE-80), a Casablanca class escort carrier of the US Navy from World War II
- Petrov (disambiguation)
