= Duo Petrof =

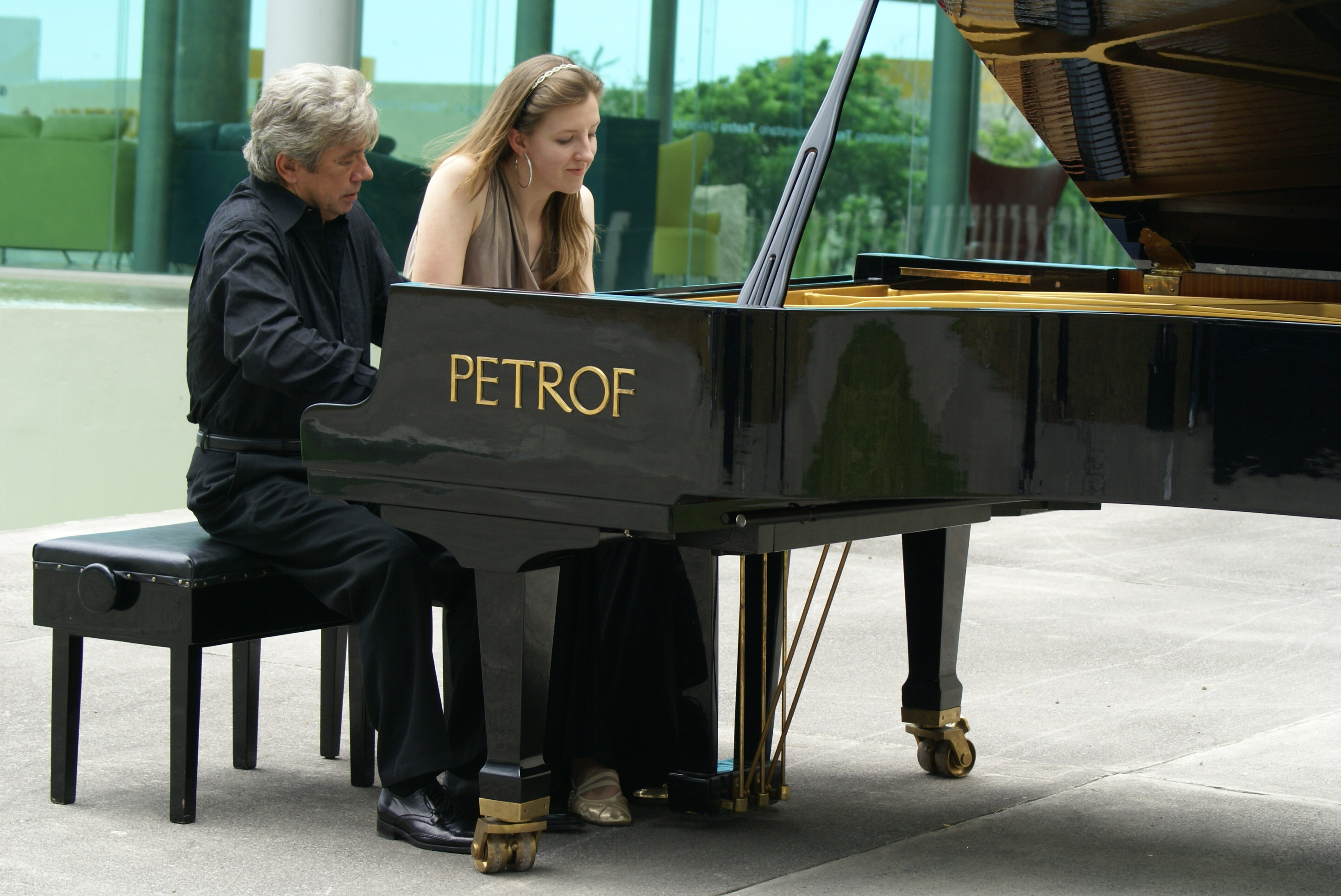
Pianists Anatoly Zatin and Vlada Vassilieva

Duo Petrof is a piano-duo composed of Anatoly Zatin (born 23 March 1954, in Uzhhorod) and Vlada Vassilieva (born 10 July 1985, in Moscow).

Anatoly Zatin is a pianist, composer and conductor graduated from the Leningrad Conservatory, member of the St Petersburg Union of Composers, professor and Dean of the Fine Arts Institute at the University of Colima in Mexico. Vlada Vassilieva studied with Anatoly Zatin at the University of Colima and later with Pavlina Dokovska at Mannes College of Music in New York City as a Fulbright grantee. She currently teaches at the University of Colima. Both pianists currently reside in Mexico.

The duo was formed in 2003 in cooperation with the University of Colima and Petrof Pianos of Mexico. Since 2008 both pianists are Petrof Artists representing Petrof Pianos worldwide.

== Performing career ==
The ensemble's first appearance under the name of Duo Petrof took place in December 2003 at the National Auditory in Mexico City. Since then the duo has performed across Mexico as well as in the United States, Europe and Asia. Important performances include Carnegie Hall (2006), Bohemian National Hall and Merkin Concert Hall (2010) in New York City, Semper Music International Festival in South Tyrol First International Art Festival in Kyrgyzstan (2012), Royce Hall in Los Angeles (2013), the First International Festival of Chamber Music "Silver Lyre" in St Petersburg (2010), Hradec Kralove Philharmony for Petrof's 150 anniversary and Sofia Music Weeks in Bulgaria.

The duo specializes mostly in 20th-century repertoire, performing music by Sergei Slonimsky, Grigoriy Korchmar, Bohuslav Martinu, Manuel Ponce, Joel Spiegelman, Alfred Schnittke, Francis Poulenc, Federico Ibarra, Doug Opel, Claude Bolling, Aleksey Igudesman and Anatoly Zatin.

== Recordings ==
- 2017 - Duo Petrof plays Ant. Petrof (Columna Musica)
- 2015 - 88x2: Music for two pianos (Columna Musica)
- 2013 - Idilio Mexicano (CONACULTA, Universidad de Colima)
- 2008 - Duo PETROF: Francis Poulenc, Darius Milhaud, Claude Debussy and transcriptions by Anatoly Zatin (Musical Iberoamericana)

== Awards ==
- 2023 - Global Music Awards: Gold Medal, Best of show
- 2020 - Global Music Awards: Silver Medal
- 2018 - United States International Duo Piano Competition: first prize
- 2017 - Global Music Awards: Silver Medal
- 2017 - On Stage international classical music competition: third prize
- 2016 - Hollywood Music in Media Awards: Nomination for El Jarabe Tapatio
- 2016 - Mexican Music Awards: Contemporary Classical Duo of the year
- 2016 - Nikolai Rubinstein Medal, Moscow Conservatory
- 2015 - Global Music Awards: Silver Medal
- 2009 - Web Concert Hall: Honorary Mention
