= Aleksei Petrov =

Aleksei Petrov (also spelled Aleksey, Alexey, or Alexei) may refer to:

- Aleksei Petrov (businessman) (1962–2023), Bulgarian oligarch
- Aleksei Petrov (cyclist) (1937–2009), Soviet cyclist who won bronze medal at the 1960 Olympics
- Aleksei Petrov, Russian spelling of Alyaksey Pyatrow (born 1991), Belarusian footballer
- Alexei Petrov (ice hockey) (born 1983), Russian professional ice hockey defenceman
- Aleksey Petrov (weightlifter) (born 1974), Russian weightlifter
- Alexey A. Petrov (born 1971), American physicist
- Aleksei Zinovyevich Petrov (1910–1972), mathematician
