= Petrov =

Petrov (Cyrillic: Петров; masculine) or Petrova (Cyrillic: Петрова; feminine) may refer to:

== People ==
- Petrov (surname) (feminine: Petrova), a Russian and Bulgarian surname
- Petrov, code name of Romanian politician Traian Băsescu as informant for Romanian intelligence agencies

== Places ==
=== Czech Republic ===
- Petrov (Blansko District), a municipality and village in the South Moravian Region
- Petrov (Hodonín District), a municipality and village in the South Moravian Region
- Petrov (Prague-West District), a municipality and village in the Central Bohemian Region
- Petrov nad Desnou, a municipality and village in the Olomouc Region
- Petrov, a hill in Brno

=== Space ===
- 4785 Petrov, an asteroid (minor planet)
- Petrov (crater), a lunar crater

=== Other ===
- Petrov, Russia (Petrova), name of several rural localities in Russia
- Petrova, Maramureș, a commune in Romania
- Petrová, a village in Slovakia

== Other ==
- Petrova (moth)

== See also ==
- Petrov Affair, a Cold War spy scandal in Australia, centered on Soviet diplomat Vladimir Petrov
- Petrov's Defence, an opening in chess
- Petrof (disambiguation)
- Petrovice (disambiguation)
