= Milko Borissov =

- Born: Milko Borissov Ivanov; February 18, 1921; Sofia
- Died: October 5, 1998 (aged 77); Sofia, Bulgaria
- Education: Sofia University
- Known for: Founder of the Institute of Solid State Physics
- Scientific career
- Fields: Solid-state physics, acoustoelectronics, plasma physics
- Workplaces: Sofia University; Bulgarian Academy of Sciences (BAS)

Milko Borissov Ivanov (18 February 1921 – 5 October 1998) was a Bulgarian physicist, member of the Bulgarian Academy of Sciences (BAS), university professor, founder of the Institute of Solid State Physics of the BAS and its director (1973–1991).

== Biography ==
Milko Borissov was born in Sofia 18 February 1921. He studied physics at Sofia University from 1939 to 1943. After World War II, he was assistant (1945–1948), associate professor and full professor. He lectured on courses in General Physics, Introduction to Solid State Physics and the Physical foundation of acoustic electronics and acoustic optics and published university textbooks on them. He could use both Germany and Russia. He was dean of the Physics and Mathematics Faculty and Sofia University deputy rector.

He was deputy director of the BAS Institute of Physics and director of the Institute of Solid-State Physics and United Centre of Physics (1973–1988). He became a member of BAS.

Borissov died in Sofia on 5 November 1998.

== Contributions ==
Borissov worked in the area of solid state physics. He initiated investigations in the area of acoustoelectronics in Bulgaria for the first time. He studied plasma physics and paramagnetic resonance. He organised and headed a history of physics group at the Institute of Solid-State physics, and published two books about physics in Bulgarian schools. He had 15 patents and supervised 10 PhD students.

== Recognition ==
A street is named Milko Borissov in Sofia's district Vitosha (Map).

A session dedicated to Borissov's memory was organised in 2003. Proceedings were published in 2006. The next memorial session marked the 90-year anniversary of Borissov's birth, on 18 February 2011.

== Publications ==
- М. Борисов, Лекции по опитна физика. Според курса, четен на студентите физици, Ч. І. 124 с.; Ч. ІІІ. 161 с. (1963)
- М. Борисов, Физика. (Учебник за студентите-физици при Физическия факултет на СУ). Ч. І. Механика. С., Наука и изкуство (1965)
- М. Борисов (ред.). Физика за ІХ клас на общообразователните трудово политехнически училища. Ч. ІІІ. София, МНП (1966)
- М. Борисов, И. Желязков, К. Маринова, П. Мисов, Х. Цеков. Физика (Механика). Учебник за ІХ клас на базовите общообразователни трудово-политехнически училища. Ч. І-ІІ. София, МНП (1967)
- М. Борисов, И. Желязков, К. Маринова, П. Мисов, Хр. Цеков. Физика, Механика. Учебник за ІХ клас, София, Народна просвета, 1. изд. (1969); 2. изд. (1970); 3. изд. (1975); 4. изд. (1979)
- М. Борисов, Й. Влахов, И. Златев, К. Маринова, П. Мисов, Хр. Попов, Хр. Цеков. Физика. Учебник за Х клас на Общообразователните трудово-политехнически училища. С., Народна просвета, 1. изд. (1971); 2. изд. (1974)
- М. Борисов, А. Дацев, И. Златев, Цв. Бончев, И. Желязков, И. Лалов, Хр. Костов, П. Мисов, П. Паликарска, Хр. Цеков. Физика. Учебник за ХІ клас на Общообразователните трудово политехнически училища. С., Народна просвета, 1. изд. (1972); 2. изд. (1974); 3. изд. (1975); 4. изд. (1979)
- М. Борисов, К. Маринова. Увод във физиката на твърдото тяло. Ч. І. С., Наука и изкуство (1977)
- М. Борисов, К. Германова, К. Маринова. Увод във физиката на твърдото тяло. Ч. ІІ. С., Наука и изкуство (1978)
- М. Борисов, К. Брънзалов, Ю. Буров, Д. Стоянов. Повърхнинни акустични вълни и някои техни приложения. С., Изд. БАН (1980)
- M. Borissov (ed). Optical and acoustic waves in solids – modern topics. Proceedings of the 2nd International school on condensed matter physics, ISCMP’82, Varna, 23–30.09.1982. Singapore, World Scientific (1983)
- М. Borissov (ed). Proceedings of the 2nd International school on condensed matter physics, ISCMP’84. Varna (1984)
- М. Борисов, А. Ваврек, Г. Камишева. Предшественици на разпространението и развитието на физическите науки в България. С., Народна просвета (1985)
- М. Борисов, К. Калайджиев. Кратък увод във физиката на твърдото тяло. Пловдив, Пловдивски университет (1986)
- М. Borissov (еd.), Molecular Electronics. – In: Proceedings of the 4th International School on Condensed Matter Physics, ISCMP’86, Varna, 18–27.09.1986. Singapore, World Scientific (1986)
- М. Borissov, N. Kirov, A. Vavrek (eds.). Disordered systems and new materials. Proceedings of the V International School on Condensed Matter Physics, ISCMP’88, Varna. Singapore, World scientific (1988)
- М. Борисов, А. Ваврек, Г. Камишева. Основоположници на обучението по физика в България. С., Народна просвета (1988)
- М. Борисов, В. Страшилов. Физика на линейните акустични и електромагнитни вълни. С., Изд. БАН (1989)
- М. Borissov, N. Kirov, J. M. Marchall, A. Vavrek (eds.). New physical problems in electronic materials, VI International School on Condensed Matter Physics, ISCMP’90. Singapore, World scientific (1990)

== Links ==
- Биография на Милко Борисов, създадена от Музея при ИФТТ - БАН
- 50 години ИФТТ-БАН
