= 2002 European Athletics Indoor Championships – Men's 200 metres =

The men's 200 metres event at the 2002 European Athletics Indoor Championships was held on March 1–2.

== Medalists ==
Gold	Silver	Bronze
Marcin Urbaś; Poland	Christian Malcolm; Great Britain	Robert Maćkowiak; Poland

== Results ==
=== Heats ===
The winner of each heat (Q) and the next 7 fastest (q) qualified for the semifinals.

Rank	Heat	Name	Nationality	Time	Notes
1	5	Daniel Caines	Great Britain	20.67	Q, SB
2	8	Robert Maćkowiak	Poland	20.75	Q, PB
3	1	Marcin Jędrusiński	Poland	20.77	Q, PB
4	4	Marcin Urbaś	Poland	20.79	Q
4	5	Anninos Marcoullides	Cyprus	20.79	q, SB
6	7	Radek Zachoval	Czech Republic	20.82	Q, SB
7	6	Christian Malcolm	Great Britain	20.83	Q
8	3	Douglas Turner	Great Britain	20.86	Q
9	2	Alessandro Attene	Italy	20.87	Q, PB
10	2	Leslie Djhone	France	20.90	q, PB
11	1	Martin Lachkovics	Austria	20.93	q, SB
12	8	Johan Engberg	Sweden	20.95	q, NR
13	7	Marc Blume	Germany	20.96	q, SB
14	6	Johan Wissman	Sweden	20.97	q, NR
15	3	Prodromos Katsantonis	Cyprus	21.04	q, SB
16	8	Martin Brinarsky	Slovakia	21.13	NR
17	4	Anastasios Gousis	Greece	21.15	
18	7	Stefano Dacastello	Italy	21.18	PB
19	5	Jiří Vojtík	Czech Republic	21.22	
20	6	Carlos Meléndez	Spain	21.24	
21	3	Matic Osovnikar	Slovenia	21.26	
22	2	Gary Ryan	Ireland	21.34	SB
23	1	Aleksander Petrov	Bulgaria	21.41	
23	4	Jimmy Melfort	France	21.41	
25	1	Joze Vrtačič	Slovenia	21.47	
26	2	Denis Busovikov	Russia	21.48	
27	7	Aleksandr Makukha	Russia	21.58	
28	4	Sergejs Inšakovs	Latvia	21.70	SB
29	5	Tom Comyns	Ireland	21.73	
30	8	Thomas Scheidl	Austria	21.92	

=== Semifinals ===
First 2 of each semifinal qualified directly (Q) for the final.

Rank	Heat	Name	Nationality	Time	Notes
1	1	Marcin Urbaś	Poland	20.55	Q, NR
2	1	Daniel Caines	Great Britain	20.62	Q, PB
3	3	Christian Malcolm	Great Britain	20.65	Q
4	2	Robert Maćkowiak	Poland	20.68	Q, PB
5	3	Marcin Jędrusiński	Poland	20.75	Q, PB
6	2	Radek Zachoval	Czech Republic	20.81	Q, SB
7	2	Douglas Turner	Great Britain	20.84	
8	3	Anninos Marcoullides	Cyprus	20.87	
9	3	Johan Wissman	Sweden	21.00	
10	1	Johan Engberg	Sweden	21.10	
11	3	Leslie Djhone	France	21.14	
12	2	Martin Lachkovics	Austria	21.18	
13	1	Alessandro Attene	Italy	21.38	
	1	Marc Blume	Germany	DNF	
	2	Prodromos Katsantonis	Cyprus	DNS	

=== Final ===
Rank	Lane	Name	Nationality	Time	Notes
1st place, gold medalist(s)	5	Marcin Urbaś	Poland	20.64	
2nd place, silver medalist(s)	6	Christian Malcolm	Great Britain	20.65	
3rd place, bronze medalist(s)	4	Robert Maćkowiak	Poland	20.77	
4	3	Daniel Caines	Great Britain	21.14	
5	2	Radek Zachoval	Czech Republic	21.15	
6	1	Marcin Jędrusiński	Poland	21.78	
