= Vladimir Viardo =

Russian pianist

Vladimir Vladimirovich Viardo (born 1949 in Krasnaya Polyana, Soviet Union), is a Russian pianist.

== Career ==
The first steps in music were taken with his mother, the classical singer, voice teacher and pianist Nathalia Viardo.

Viardo studied with Irina Naumova at the Gnessin State Musical College and later studied with Lev Naumov at the Moscow Conservatory, where he remained as a student for six years. Naumov would describe him as "my number one pupil". During this time, he was tenured as a soloist by Moscow Philharmonia (the primary music organization of the USSR). After obtaining a doctorate, he was immediately engaged as assistant professor with Naumov at the Conservatory. At the age of 21 Viardo took the third prize and the Prix du Prince Rainier at the Marguerite Long-Jacques Thibaud Competition, and in 1973 first prize at the Van Cliburn International Competition. He had already launched an impressive world career when his travel visa was mysteriously revoked. For nearly thirteen years, Viardo was a virtual prisoner behind the Iron Curtain. During this period, he developed new horizons, vastly enlarging his repertoire, eventually including 37 concertos. Only when Mikhail Gorbachev rose to power in the Soviet Union was his freedom to travel restored; in 1987 he was permitted to accept engagements in Germany and in the United States.

He joined the University of North Texas College of Music faculty as artist-in-residence in 1989. His international roster of students includes young artists from Eastern Europe, as well as Portugal, Spain, Mexico, South Africa and the United States. Viardo's master classes are much in demand throughout the world and his name appears in the book The Most Wanted Piano Teachers in the USA.

Since returning to the West where his international career resumed with several concerts at Carnegie Hall, the Lincoln and Kennedy Centers, Salle Pleyel and the Concertgebouw, Viardo's tours have taken him to American, Canadian and European cities, Asia and South Africa as well as to Israel, Central and South America, appearing as soloist with conductors such as Lorin Maazel, Zubin Mehta, Vladimir Spivakov, Dmitri Kitayenko, Eduardo Mata, Anatoly Zatin, Kirill Kondrashin, and Krzysztof Penderecki. He has made numerous recordings for Melodiya, Pro Arte, Nonesuch, and Sony.

== Audio samples ==
- Johann Sebastian Bach, Fugue in G minor, BWV 542 on YouTube
- Rachmaninoff, Prelude in C minor, Op.23 on YouTube
- Bach, Liszt, Dance – Contortion – Ballet – Slo-Motion Sept 28, 2010, VOB on YouTube
- Schubert, Liszt — Kari Pearce, gymnast – 2008 on YouTube
- Franck, Prelude, Fugue and Variation in B minor, Op.18 on YouTube

== Sources ==
- Vladimir Viardo | College of Music
- Vladimir Viardo (Piano) - Short Biography
