= Maria Petrova =

Maria Petrova may refer to:

- Maria Petrova (rhythmic gymnast) (born 1975), rhythmic gymnast from Bulgaria
- Maria Petrova (figure skater) (born 1977), pairs figure skater from Russia
- Maria Petrova (spree killer) (born 1978), Russian spree killer
- Maria Petrova (economist), Russian economist working in Spain
