= Grigory Petrov (priest) =

Russian priest and publicist

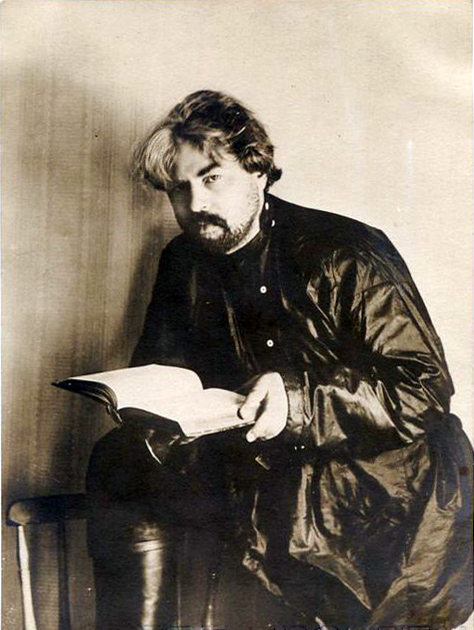
- Petrov in 1908
- Born: Grigory Spiridonovich Petrov; February 6, 1866; Yamburg, Imperial Russia
- Died: 1925 (aged 58–59); Paris, France
- Resting place: Munich, Germany

Grigory Spiridonovich Petrov (Russian: Григо́рий Спиридо́нович Петро́в; 6 February 1866 – 1925) was a priest, public figure, and publicist.

Petrov was born in Yamburg (now Kingisepp, Leningrad Oblast) and graduated from St. Petersburg Theological Seminary in 1886 and St. Petersburg Theological Academy in 1891. From 1895 through to 1906, he served as a prior of the Church of Mikhaylovsky Ordnance Academy; while in 1902–1904 he also worked as a lecturer of theology at the Polytechnical Institute. He wrote books, brochures and articles where he advocated Christian socialism. In 1899–1917, he contributed to Russkoe slovo newspaper. In 1901–1903, he took part in various religious and philosophic meetings. In 1905, he joined the renovated church movement in opposition to the Russian Orthodox Church, and published Pravda Bozhiya newspaper in 1906. In 1907, he was elected Deputy of the Second State Duma as a member of the Constitutional Democratic Party. The same year following his critical letter addressed to Metropolitan Anthony he was banned from his ministry and sent for discipline to the Cheremenetsky Monastery. He was defrocked in 1908, and consequently was banned from living in St. Petersburg. He travelled around the country giving lectures. Petrov welcomed the February Revolution of 1917, although his attitude towards the Bolshevik overturn was negative. In 1920, he emigrated and lived in Bulgaria and Serbia. He died in Paris and was buried in Munich. Aziz Sami translated some Petrov's works to Arabic from Turkish.

== Bibliography ==
- (1898) Gospel as the basis of life (112 pages)
- (1902) Towards the light: A collection of articles
- (1903) Jewish kingdom (32 pages)
- (1903) School and Life (173 pages)
- (1903) "Apostle of Temperance" (88 pages)
- (1903) To light! Collection of Articles (143 pages)
- (1903) People-Brothers (47 pages)
- (1903) Conversations on God and God's truth (213 pages)
- (1903) Collected papers: Grain Goodness (144 pages)
- (1903) St. Seraphim of Sarov
- (1903) God's way: a collection of articles priest G. Petrov (119 pages)
- (1903) In the Footsteps of Christ (4 pages)
- (1903) Gifts of Artabana: short story (36 pages)
- (1904) Brother Writers (151 pages)
- (1904) Zateynik: Volume 1 (192 pages)
- (1904) War and Peace (61 pages)
- (1904) Grains of Goodness (126 pages)
- (1904) Down with alcoholism: a collection of articles (165 pages)
- (1905) Oblagodetel'stvovannaja (40 pages)
- (1905) Man - sacred shrine: Poems (16 pages)
- (1905) At the wrong end (77 pages)
- (1906) Aladdin's Lamp (183 pages)
- (1906) Cities and People: thoughts and impressions (211 pages)
- (1906) Church and Society (87 pages)
- (1907) Duma and the impression (160 pages)
- (1908) God's Workers: collection of articles (108 pages)
- (1912) Literature and Life (24 pages)
- (1912) have an empty well: a collection of articles (308 pages)
- (1913) Our sores: a collection of articles (320 pages)
- (1913) Under a False window: a collection of articles (336 pages)
- (1923) Finland: the country of white lilies (180 pages), about the life of Johan Vilhelm Snellman
- (2000) The Prophet of Bolshevism: Dostoevsky and Dostoevschina (64 pages)
