= Petroff =

Petroff is a surname, a transcription of the surname Cyrillic: Петров. Petrov. Notable people with the name include:

- Boris Petroff (1894–1972), American film director and producer
- Ivan Petrof (1842? – 1896) (commonly spelled "Petroff" in sources), Russian-born soldier, writer, and translator
- Jean-Marc Petroff (1962–2012), French serial killer
- Nikola Petroff (1873–1925), Bulgarian wrestler
- Peter Petroff(1919–2003), Bulgarian American inventor, engineer, NASA scientist, and adventurer
- Peter Petroff (communist) (1884–1947), Russian activist, journalist, active in the United Kingdom and Germany
- Ruth Petroff (born 1965), American politician
- Yves Petroff, French scientist
