= Finland: The Country of White Lilies =

1923 book by Grigory Petrov

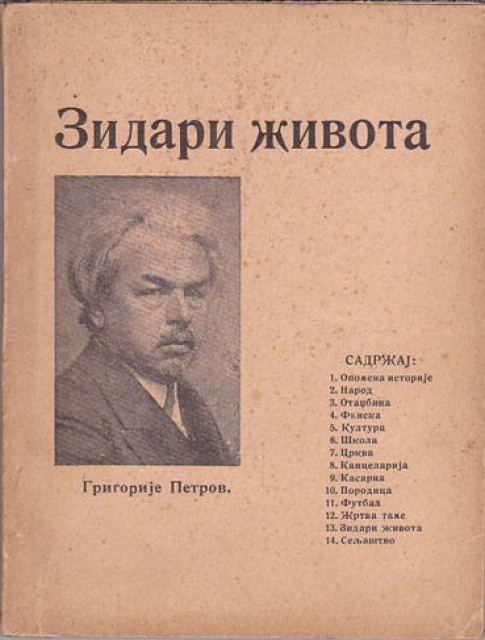
- Author: Grigory Petrov
- Original title: Зидари живота
- Publication date: 1923

Finland, The Country of White Lilies is a non-fiction book authored by the Russian priest and social-activist Grigory Spiridonovich Petrov (1866–1925). Petrov dedicated a non-fiction book to Finland and Johan Vilhelm Snellman, written while he was living in Serbia after the October Revolution. The work describes the country as a role model and a living example for other states such as Russia. The book was published in Serbian under the title "Зидари живота" ("Creators of Life") in 1923.

The book was published and reprinted many times in different languages after Petrov's death (including 14 times in Bulgarian and 16 times in Turkish).

== Author of the book ==
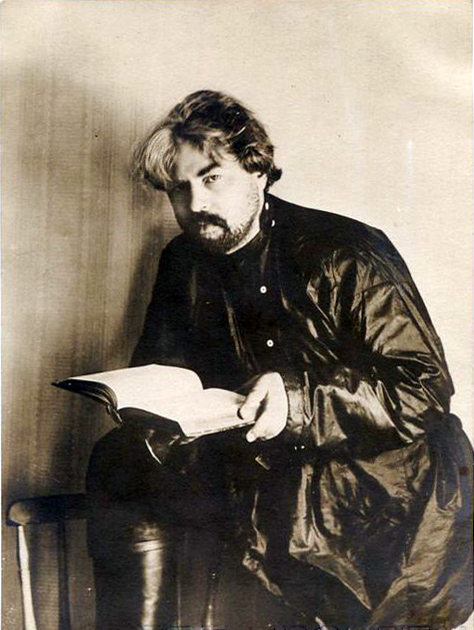
Grigory Petrov (c. 1908)

Grigory Spiridonovich Petrov (1866—1925) was a priest, public figure, journalist, publicist, and preacher. Born in Yamburg (now — Kingisepp of Leningrad Oblast). He graduated from the Saint Petersburg Theological Academy. He lectured, among other places, at the Mikhailovskoye Artillery School, Page Corps, Tsarskoye Selo Lyceum, Polytechnic Institute, and at various gymnasiums. He was quite popular especially in St. Petersburg as his public lectures attracted crowds of people. His books were sold in many bookstores and were in great demand. In 1898 his work "The Gospel as the Foundation of Life" was published, later going through about 20 editions and translated into many languages. In this work, Petrov called for turning to the Gospel as a source of knowledge about how one should behave in everyday life. Maxim Gorky in his letter to Anton Chekhov wrote about this book that "there is much soul in it, a clear and deeply believing soul...". Petrov's ideas had many points of contact with the moral preaching of Leo Tolstoy.

Petrov's writings and speeches created for him the reputation of an "unreliable" priest, and in 1903 he was dismissed from his position as rector and teacher. In 1907 he was elected deputy to the 2nd State Duma on the list of the Constitutional Democratic Party. In 1908 he was defrocked. He welcomed the February Revolution of 1917, but condemned the Bolsheviks' rise to power.

In 1920, Petrov traveled from Crimea to Constantinople in the hold of a steamship, then ended up in a refugee camp in Gallipoli (now — Gelibolu), then in Trieste, and later in Belgrade. He lived in Serbia and Bulgaria. He died in 1925 in a clinic near Paris.

== Reissues ==
After the author's death, in 1925, the book was published in Bulgarian under the title "В страната на белите лилии" ("In the Country of White Lilies").

The book was translated from Bulgarian into Turkish, with the first edition being published in Istanbul in 1928. Mustafa Kemal Atatürk liked the book so much that he ordered it to be included in the curriculum of educational institutions, including military schools – as a guide to the "renewal of life".

Later, the book was published and republished many times in different languages under different titles, including 14 editions in Bulgarian and at least 16 editions in Turkish, and in the preface to one of the editions it was said that this was the most widely read book in modern Turkish in Turkey.

In 1978 the book was published in Finnish. Interestingly, this edition was translated from Turkish, while the book had originally been translated into Turkish from Bulgarian, despite the fact that Petrov wrote it in Russian.

The book was first published in Russian by the publisher "European House" in 2004 under the title "Finland, the Land of White Lilies". Financial and moral support for the publication was provided by the Institute of Russia and Eastern Europe of Finland, the presentation of the book in Helsinki took place in August 2004.

There are also known publications of the book in Arabic and Kurdish.

== Contents of the book ==
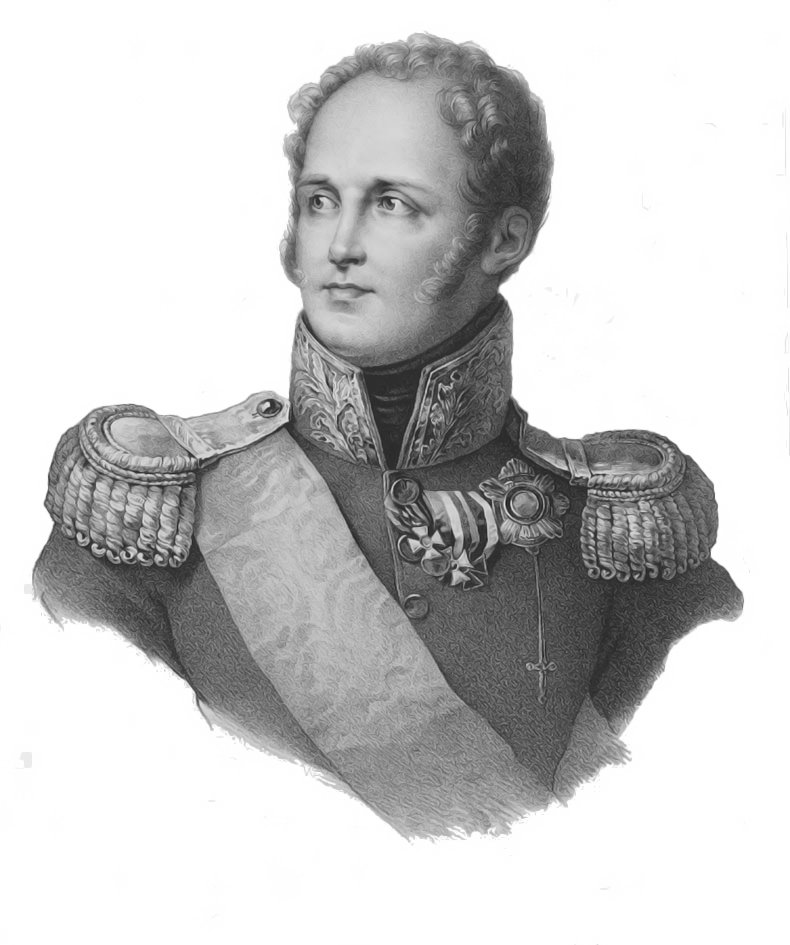
By the Grace of God, We, Alexander the First, Emperor and Autocrat over the entire country of Russia, Grand Duke in Finland. By the will of the Most High having entered into possession of the Grand Duchy of Finland, we recognized it as prudent hereby to reaffirm and confirm the religion, the fundamental laws, the rights and privileges, by which each estate of this Duchy in particular and all the subjects inhabiting it, from the least to the greatest, according to their constitutions have hitherto enjoyed, promising to preserve them in their inviolable and unalterable force and effect; in testimony of which we have been pleased to confirm this charter by Our own signature. In the city of Borgo. 15 March 1809. Manifesto of Borgo of Alexander I

In his book Petrov talks about Finland, idealizing it and setting it as an example, describing it as a model for imitation and a living example for other states such as Russia in the political, economic, and cultural spheres. Through a mixture of historical facts and his own ideas about an ideal state, in the construction of which both ordinary people and "leaders of the people" take active part, the author creates a myth, "an almost fairy-tale narrative about a heroic people," “an instruction for the organization of an ideal state".

The book begins with the author's reflections that the wisdom of state governance lies in timely renewal, in sensitive reaction to changes in circumstances, in replacing the foundation on which the "building of the state" stands; if such renewal does not occur, the state loses its vital force and inevitably perishes (Chapter I. Mene, Tekel, Peres). Petrov then writes that the condition in which a state finds itself depends both on rulers (heroes), that is, those who by virtue of their special qualities or circumstances have found themselves at the "edge of movement," and on the inhabitants of the country, on their will and aspirations. An example of how citizens themselves can influence the power and prosperity of a state "can be a small, poor country with two million inhabitants" — Finland (Chapter II. Heroes and the Mass).

“Ikuinen taistelu" ("The Eternal Struggle") is a 1903 play by the Finnish writer and journalist Johannes Linnankoski (1869—1913), a performance of which Petrov once watched in Helsinki; the "eternal struggle," in Petrov's opinion, is also an accurate description of what is happening in Finland: an eternal struggle with harsh nature, a struggle of new beginnings with remnants of the past, a struggle of light with darkness. And the results achieved by this struggle are very noticeable in all areas — in education, in the achievement of women's equality, and in the struggle against drunkenness (Chapter III. “Ikuinen taistelu”). All these successes occurred over a relatively small span of time in historical perspective, since before the beginning of the 19th century Finland, being part of Sweden, was in a subordinate, undeveloped condition, and the culture of the people did not advance beyond elementary literacy. Russia, having conquered Finland as a result of another Russo-Swedish War of 1808—1809 (Petrov uses the expression "the union of Finland and Russia"), thereby pushed the border away from Saint Petersburg, while Finland in return received autonomy and a real opportunity to develop its culture (Chapter IV. Suomi).

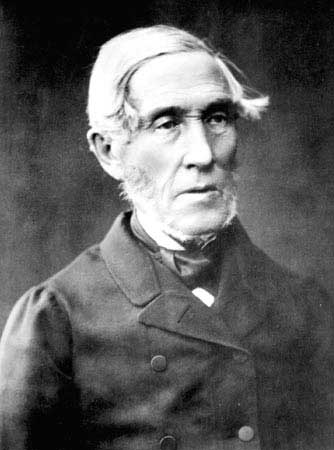
Johan Snellman. Senator and ideologist of the Finnish national revival

In the next eight chapters the main acting figure becomes one of the principal ideologists of the Finnish national revival, Johan Vilhelm Snellman (1806—1881) — philosopher, statesman, journalist, who fought among other things for the status of the Finnish language as a language of culture and state administration. Petrov calls Snellman the "leader of the apostles of Finnish culture" and the "best representative of the new young Finnish intelligentsia." In a highly mythologized form he recounts how Snellman stood at the head of a "crusade for the enlightenment of the popular masses," traveled around the country, met with people, gathered school teachers and spoke before them, calling on them to "awaken the thought of the people" (Chapter V. Snellman); to church figures Snellman said that the dying of religion should be blamed not on science or the intelligentsia but first of all on themselves; he called on priests to shake off the "layer of dead scholasticism from the living Christ," to cease being church officials and become true shepherds of their people (Chapter VI. The Church). Into Snellman's mouth Petrov also placed reflections about how important it is to have intelligent, honest, and hardworking officials, since officials, being representatives of the law, become the chief teachers of injustice when they themselves do not obey the law, forget morality, and do not know how or wish to work (Chapter VII. Administration). The essence of changes in the army Snellman, according to Petrov, saw in the fact that there should not be that abyss between officers and soldiers that existed under the Swedes, when officers saw in the soldier only cannon fodder; the officer must be a teacher and educator to the soldier; the barracks must not be a scarecrow for the people, it must "grow up intellectually and morally," it must become a people's school and a people's university (Chapter VIII. Barracks). Snellman, according to Petrov, regarded sport quite positively, yet he was outraged that for some young people sport becomes the main thing in life and in pursuit of the "legs of a buffalo" they forget about their intellectual development, about the "head of Socrates" (Chapter IX. Football). Snellman associated the future of the country precisely with youth; for this, in his opinion, it is very important that children be raised in a morally and intellectually healthy family environment. When parents say one thing but themselves act in the opposite way, children cease to respect them, cease to listen to them, and in the end have no respect for labor, for their homeland, or for themselves (Chapter X. Parents and Children).

The 11th chapter of the book is devoted to several life stories, including the stories of the robber Karokep and the "sweet king" Järvinen. Childhood friends, their paths later diverged, only to cross again later. Karokep, having experienced injustice and attempted to fight it by means of violence, discovered that the oppressed and deceived were not on his side at all, after which he "challenged God," beginning to rob and kill; this ended when a priest, who himself had nearly perished at the hands of Karokep, opened his eyes, explaining that God does not accept Karokep's challenge, does not wish to fight him, since He thinks in other categories, namely the categories of love... The meaning of Järvinen's story, meanwhile, was that if the robber Karokep was able to leave darkness and emptiness and turn into an honest and worthy man, then this is all the more accessible to others; and it depends first of all on how a person relates to the life around him: everyone can make himself what he wants to make himself, every shoemaker can become the king of shoes, every seller of eggs at the market — the egg king, every blacksmith — the king of iron. “Such a transformation can be achieved in every country; in every district. In every most remote corner...” (Chapter XI. Karokep). In the next chapter Petrov, in the name of Snellman, reflects on the essential differences between high society and the peasantry, the “simple people.” High society he compares with a well-kept and orderly garden in which everything is thought out and pleases the eye; the common people — with a forest in which no one ever cleans or repairs anything, where a tree fallen from a storm will lie and rot. As a remedy for correcting the situation Petrov describes how specialist doctors, elected public figures, and other enthusiasts of their work, with the support of the state, fought in Finnish villages against unsanitary conditions, poverty, and the wretchedness of existence (Chapter XII. The Peasantry).

The form of presentation of the material in the final chapter is the author's retelling of a nonexistent book by a certain Finnish rural priest MacDonald, a Swedish nobleman of Scottish origin, who throughout his life engaged in the spiritual enlightenment of the Finns, trying to breathe life into the dried tree of religion. MacDonald in Petrov's presentation wrote that the people are “more ill than we usually think,” that the people have become “practical atheists,” since God and religion play no role in their lives, while the clergy at the same time “sleep deeply, a dead sleep, sleep criminally,” having surrounded the Gospel with petty rules and interpretations and forgotten the meaning of the teaching of Jesus Christ. The Finnish church MacDonald compares with a river mill whose millstones turn but into which no one pours grain. MacDonald wrote that the construction of life is inevitably made difficult by the fact that it is necessary not only to build but also to struggle against destructive forces, that conscientious workers often do not meet with public sympathy, that swindlers and ambitious people often intrude into large and good public causes: “Do not tire of lighting the flames!.. Burn yourselves and ignite others until it becomes bright around you... Instead of approval and sympathy there may be mockery. Instead of honor and glory — slander and hatred. Instead of help — secret intrigues and even open struggle against you. ...Thousands of dark forces will try to extinguish your bright cause — you burn! Burn and ignite!” (Chapter XIII. Pastor MacDonald).

== Reviews ==
The ideas expressed by Petrov in his work were received with great enthusiasm in both Serbia and Bulgaria. In 1926 a cultural and public group "Grigory Petrov" was even created to spread Petrov's ideas. Mihail Yovov, Minister of Public Education of Bulgaria, in the preface to one of the editions wrote about the Finnish model as an example of an ideal solution to social problems.

In Turkey, the prefaces to some editions of the book stated that its value lay not in what it told about Finland, but in the fact that, thanks to it, "we can see what we are and what we can become." In 1928, it was written about the book in Turkey that "it was as if the two-million Finnish people had conducted this experiment for us to make our path easier and to show us, their big brother, that we can continue the path we are on, confidently and without doubt. This is not only an example, but also proof that we will win".
