= G. Rösler =

Czech piano manufacturer

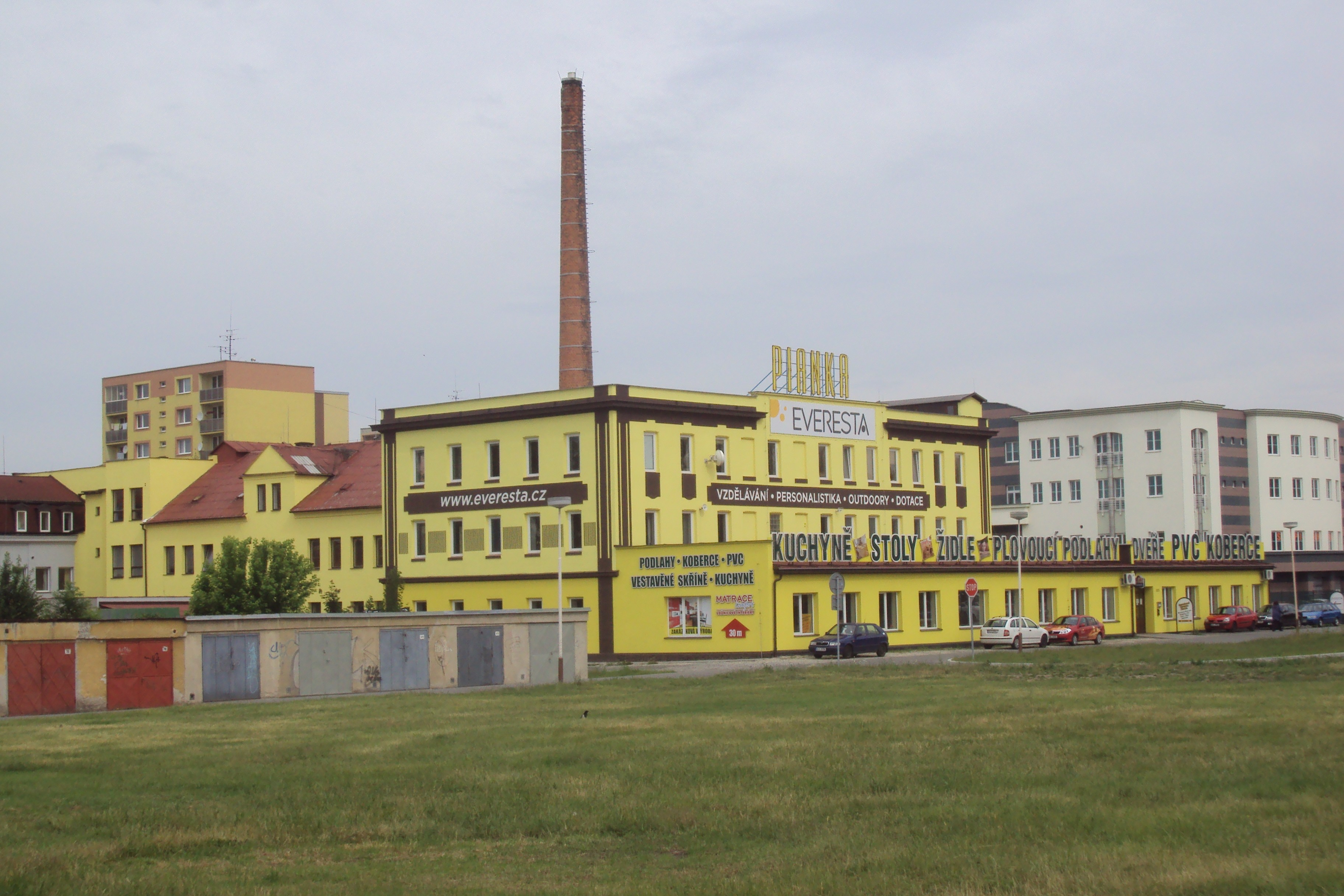
Pianoforte manufacture G. Rösler in Böhmisch Leipa (Česká Lípa)

G. Rösler is a piano manufacturer established in Česká Lípa, Bohemia in 1878 by Gustav Rösler. The pianos bore his full name, appearing in Gothic script.

After Rösler's death in 1891 his wife ran the firm, until in 1899 her brother Ludwig Gatter bought the firm and gradually expanded and modernised it. Gatter was awarded an imperial and royal warrant of appointment to the court of Austria-Hungary.

After the creation of the First Czechoslovak Republic Gatter’s sons took over the company.

After the 1948 Czechoslovak coup d'état, the company was nationalized.

After 1993 Rösler was bought by Petrof, a Czech piano manufacturer founded in 1864.
