= Nikola Petrov =

Nikola Petrov may refer to:

- Nikola Petroff (1873–1925), Bulgarian wrestler
- Nikola Petrov (terrorist), Bulgarian terrorist
- Nikola Petrov (painter) (1881-1916) Bulgarian artist

== See also ==
- Nikolai Petrov (disambiguation)
