= Aziz Sami =

Iraqi writer and translator

- عزيز سامي
- Born: 1895; Kirkuk
- Died: 19 July 1984 (aged 88–89); Baghdad
- Occupations: Writer and translator

Aziz Sami Bey Abi-Samim (1895 – 19 July 1984) was an Iraqi writer and translator. Born in Kirkuk, then part of the Ottoman Empire he moved to Istanbul to continue his studies and taught in schools in various parts of the Ottoman Empire, before ending up in Iraq upon the empire's disintegration. He held several government positions in the Ministries of Finance and Education. After the 14 July Revolution moved to the Institute of Fine Arts as dean there.

== Early life ==
Aziz Sami Abi-Samim was born in Kirkuk in 1895 to an Arab carpenter family. He moved to Istanbul and studied at the Teachers' House.

== Career ==
He then returned to Iraq and beginning work as schoolteacher from September 1926. He worked at the Ministry of Finance in 1933 as a financial inspector. He returned to the Ministry of Education and was appointed Director of the Kirkuk Area Education in October 1937 before moving to Mosul. He worked as Director of Service and Owners at the Ministry of Finance in June 1940.
He retired from the service and was appointed after 14 July Revolution as dean of the Institute of Fine Arts. His books includes general geography of Iraq and many translations from Turkish to Arabic, made him one of the pioneers of scientific translation in twentieth century.

== Death ==
Aziz Sami died in Baghdad on July 19, 1984.

== Works ==
- Modern Geography of Iraq, 1929.
- Inspirations, Turkish, 19365.
- Pacific World
- Bride of the Gulf: Kuwait, 1951.

And translated many books from Turkish as second language to Arabic, including Jules Verne and Grigory Spiridonovich Petrov works.
