= Georgi Nadjakov =

Georgi S. Nadjakov
- Георги Стефанов Наджаков
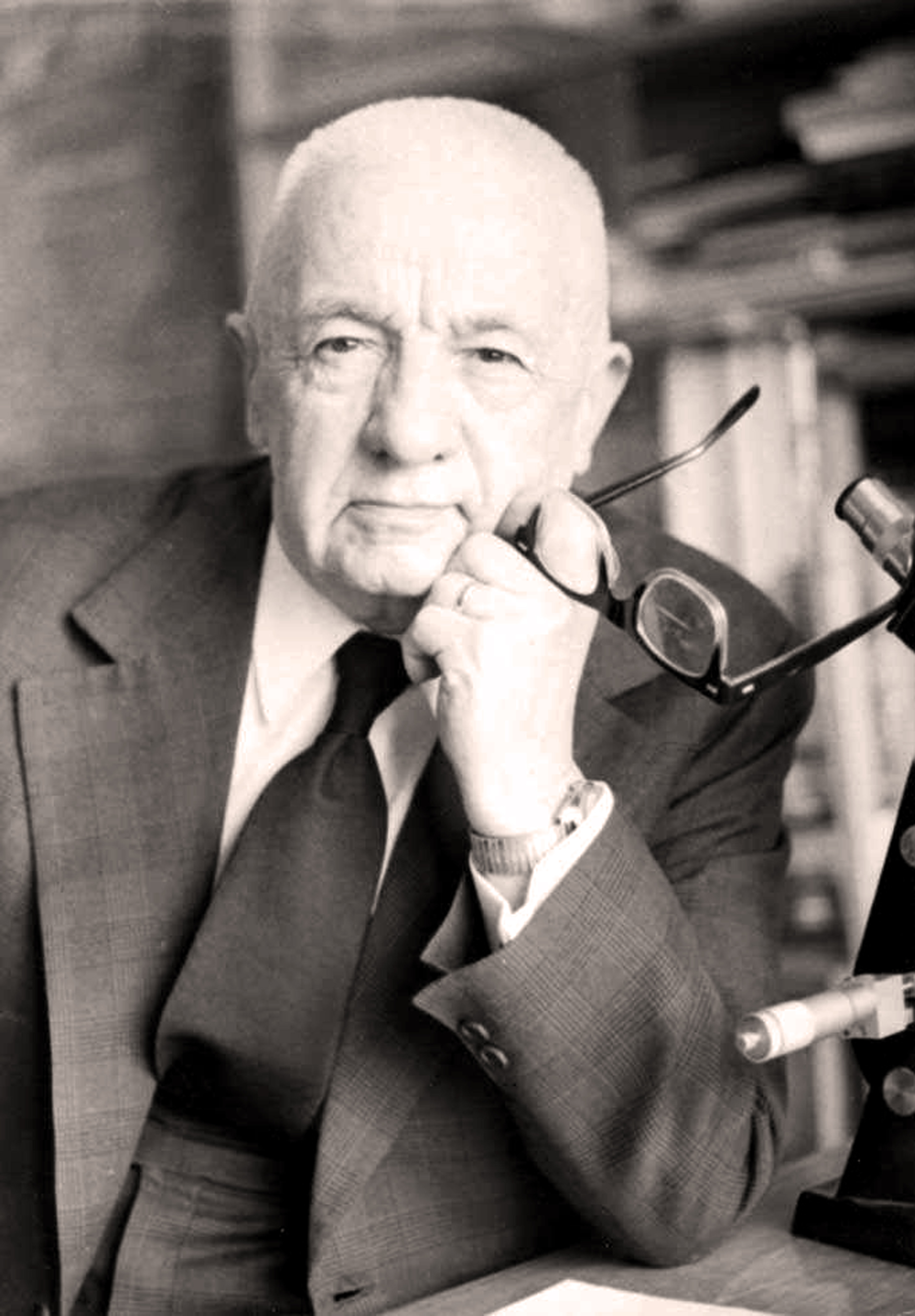
- Born: (7 January 1897 [O.S. 26 December 1896] Dupnitsa, Bulgaria
- Died: 24 February 1981 (aged 84); Sofia
- Resting place: Central Sofia Cemetery
- Education: Sofia University
- Scientific career
- Fields: Physics
- Workplaces: Sofia University; Institute of Physics, Bulgarian Academy of Sciences

Georgi Nadjakov (also spelled Georgi Nadzhakov or Nadjakov; Georges Nadjakoff) (Bulgarian: Георги Наджаков) (7 January 1897 [O.S. 26 December 1896] – 24 February 1981) was a Bulgarian physicist. He was a corresponding member of the Göttingen Academy of Sciences (1940) in Germany, member of the Bulgarian Academy of Sciences (1945) and member of the Russian Academy of Sciences (1958).

== Career ==
Sofia University sent him to specialize in the laboratories of Paul Langevin and Marie Curie in Paris, where he investigated photoelectricity for one year.

Georgi Nadjakov experimentally investigated photoconducting properties of sulphur. He prepared the permanent photoelectret state of matter for the first time and published his paper in 1937 and 1938. He called the electret discovered by Mototaro Eguchi in 1919, thermoelectret and the electret discovered by him in 1937, photoelectret.

Photoelectrets were the most notable achievement of Georgi Nadjakov. Its practical application led to the invention of the photocopier by Chester Carlson some years later.

Since 1958 Nadjakov had been a member of the Pugwash Movement of Scientists for Peace.

== Honours ==
- Nadjakov Glacier on Graham Land in Antarctica is named after Georgi Nadjakov.
- Institute of Solid State Physics is since 1982 known as Georgi Nadjakov Institute of Solid State Physics. Its predecessor was founded by Georgi Nadjakov in 1946.
- The study of Georgy Nadjakov is a Historic Site of the European Physical Society since 23 May 2014.
