= Vasily Petrov =

Vasily Petrov may refer to:

- Vasily Vladimirovich Petrov (1761–1834), Russian physicist who discovered an electric arc effect
- Vasily Petrov (marshal) (Vasily Ivanovich Petrov, 1917–2014), Soviet marshal
- Vasily Petrov (general) (Vasily Stepanovich Petrov, 1922–2003), twice Hero of the Soviet Union
- Vasily Rodionovich Petrov (1875–1937), Russian opera singer

== See also ==
- Vasili Komaroff (Vasili Terentyevich Petrov, 1871–1923), Russian serial killer
- Petrov (disambiguation)
