= Vladimir Petrov =

Vladimir Petrov may refer to:

- Vladimir Petrov (director) (1896–1966), Soviet film director
- Vladimir Petrov (diplomat) (1907–1991), Soviet diplomat who defected to Australia
- Vladimir Nikolayevich Petrov (1915–1999), writer, teacher, and former prisoner of the Soviet Gulag
- Vladimir Petrov (footballer) (born 1940), Soviet international footballer
- Vladimir Petrov (rowing) (born 1930), Soviet coxswain at the 1956 Summer Olympics
- Vladimir Petrov (ice hockey) (1947–2017), Soviet ice hockey player
- Vladimirs Petrovs (1907–1943), Latvian chess player, also known as Vladimir Petrov
- Vladimir Petrov (wrestler) (born 1961), ring name of American wrestler Al Blake
