= Ivan Petrov =

Ivan Petrov may refer to:

- Ivan Petrov (ataman) (16th century), Cossack ataman, Russian explorer of China and Mongolia
- Ivan Atanassov Petrov (born 1947), Bulgarian neurologist
- Ivan Petrov (NKVD), Soviet NKVD officer, chief of GUPVI
- Ivan Fyodorovich Petrov (1897—1994), Soviet Air Force general, head of the Central Aerohydrodynamic Institute (1940-1941) and Flight Research Institute (1947-1951), first rector of the Moscow Institute of Physics and Technology (1952-1962)
- Ivan Georgiev Petrov (born 1949), Bulgarian-American physicist, past president of American Vacuum Society
- Ivan Petrov (army general) (1896–1958), Soviet army general
- Ivan Ivanovich Petrov (1920–2003), Russian bass singer
