= Maria Petrova (spree killer) =

Russian female serial killer

Maria Aleksandrovna Petrova (born May 15, 1978), known as the "Zyuzino Maniac", is a Russian spree killer who killed two men and attempted to kill others. Her crimes, to some extent, are unique in the criminal history of Russia.

== Biography ==
Maria Petrova enjoyed swimming since childhood, but was uncommunicative and withdrawn. Once, according to her own statements, she was raped. The rapist, according to Petrova, was a young man. After that, as she claimed, she was molested by an elderly colleague at work, and developed a deep hatred for men.

She taught physical education at the Moscow Electron-Technological College, showing the following characteristics:

... During her work, she showed herself as a disciplined, conscientious and hard-working teacher. In addition to training sessions in physical culture, she created and organized the work of a sports section in weight-lifting. M. Petrova continues to actively engage in sports - swimming...

Petrova also had a degree in psychoneurology. She was described as having a muscular figure, broad shoulders and was fairly tall.

On March 1, 2002, Petrova killed 20-year-old Sergei Makariev by stabbing him twice with a knife. Subsequently, she explained that he harassed her, but no witnesses confirmed this. The murder took place at the bus stop of the Shalom Theater, near Varshavskaya Metro Station. On March 27, Petrova killed a 60-year-old pensioner, Nikolai Zhabin, by cutting his throat. Subsequently, Petrova committed three more attempted murders (all victims survived), and was suspected of another attack, but was not charged due to lack of evidence. All attacks were carried out in the same way—stab wounds to the peritoneum and neck.

Petrova was not afraid of being caught, as she committed her crimes in front of dozens of people. Having a sufficiently public profession as a teacher and committing crimes in one area, she was soon exposed and arrested on April 23, 2002. Petrova confessed to everything. She was charged with killing two and attempting to kill four more people. The forensic psychiatric examination recognized her as insane and sent her for compulsory treatment.
