= Oleg Petrov (disambiguation) =

Oleg Petrov is a Russian ice hockey player.

Also:

- Oleg Petrov (footballer), Russian footballer
- Oleg Petrov (bobsleigh), Russian Olympic bobsledder
