= Alexey A. Petrov =

American physicist

Alexey A Petrov
- Born: 1971 (age 54–55); Leningrad, USSR
- Education: Peter the Great St. Petersburg Polytechnic University; University of Massachusetts Amherst
- Known for: Heavy quark physics
- Awards: Fellow of the American Physical Society, NSF CAREER Award
- Scientific career
- Fields: Physics
- Workplaces: Johns Hopkins University, Cornell University, Wayne State University
- Doctoral advisor: John F Donoghue

Alexey A Petrov is an American physicist known for his theoretical research in the area of physics of heavy quarks. Petrov is a USC Endowed Chair in Physics and the chair of the Department of Physics and Astronomy at the University of South Carolina. Previously he was a professor of physics at Wayne State University. He is the first particle theorist in the State of Michigan to receive National Science Foundation's CAREER award

== Career ==
Petrov graduated from the Peter the Great St. Petersburg Polytechnic University in Saint Petersburg, Russia, with a diploma in physics in 1994. In 1997, he graduated from the University of Massachusetts Amherst, with a Doctor of Philosophy in theoretical physics under the direction of John F. Donoghue. He went on to do postdoctoral research at Johns Hopkins University (1997–2000), and Cornell University (2000–2001) before joining the faculty of Wayne State University in 2001. He moved to the University of South Carolina as a USC Endowed Chair in Physics and the chair of the Department of Physics and Astronomy in 2022.

== Honors ==
Petrov received National Science Foundation CAREER Award in 2005. He was elected a Fellow of the American Physical Society in 2015 “for contributions to heavy flavor physics, in particular studies of charm quarks and contributions to indirect searches for physics beyond the Standard Model.” He was among the first professors to be awarded a Comenius Guest Professorship (2015–16) at the University of Siegen in Siegen, Germany.

== Books ==
- 2016. ‘’Effective Field Theories’’ (with A. Blechman). Singapore: World Scientific. ISBN 978-981-4434-92-8
- 2021. ‘’Indirect Searches for New Physics’’. Boca Raton: CRC Press. ISBN 978-081-5386-04-9
