= Aleksandr Petrov (footballer, born 1984) =

Russian footballer

Personal information
- Full name: Aleksandr Aleksandrovich Petrov
- Date of birth: 27 May 1984 (age 42)
- Height: 1.90 m (6 ft 3 in)
- Position: Forward

Senior career*
Years	Team	Apps	(Gls)
2004–2005	FC Reutov	53	(8)
2006–2008	FC Anzhi Makhachkala	52	(6)
2009	FC Volgar-Gazprom-2 Astrakhan	9	(0)
2009	FC Torpedo Vladimir	12	(0)
2010	FC Torpedo Moscow	26	(9)
2011	FC Torpedo Vladimir	19	(2)
2011	FC Zenit Penza	9	(1)
- * Club domestic league appearances and goals

Aleksandr Aleksandrovich Petrov (Russian: Александр Александрович Петров; born 27 May 1984) is a former Russian professional football player.

== Club career ==
He made his Russian Football National League debut for FC Anzhi Makhachkala on 26 March 2006 in a game against FC KAMAZ Naberezhnye Chelny. He played 5 seasons in the FNL for Anzhi, FC Volgar-Gazprom-2 Astrakhan and FC Torpedo Vladimir.
