= Petar Petrov =

Petar Petrov may refer to:

- Petar Petrov (footballer, born 1961), Bulgarian football defender
- Petar Petrov (footballer, born 1984), Bulgarian football midfielder
- Petar Petrov (footballer, born 1988), Bulgarian football goalkeeper
- Petar Petrov (sprinter) (born 1955), Bulgarian runner
- Petar Petrov (weightlifter) (born 1974), Bulgarian weightlifter
- Petar Petrov (politician) (born 1983), Bulgatian politician
- Peter Petroff (1919–2003), Bulgarian-American inventor
- Peter Petroff (communist) (1884–1947), Russian communist activist
