= Aleksander Petrov (sprinter) =

Bulgarian sprinter (born 1979)

Aleksander Petrov (Bulgarian: Александър Петров; born 9 August 1979) is a Bulgarian runner. He competed in the 2002 European Athletics Indoor Championships – Men's 200 metres on 1 March 2002, with a time of 21.41 in heat 1, not qualifying for the finals or semi-finals.
