= Institute of Solid State Physics (Bulgaria) =

Research institute in Bulgaria

Coordinates: 42°39′9″N 23°23′20″E

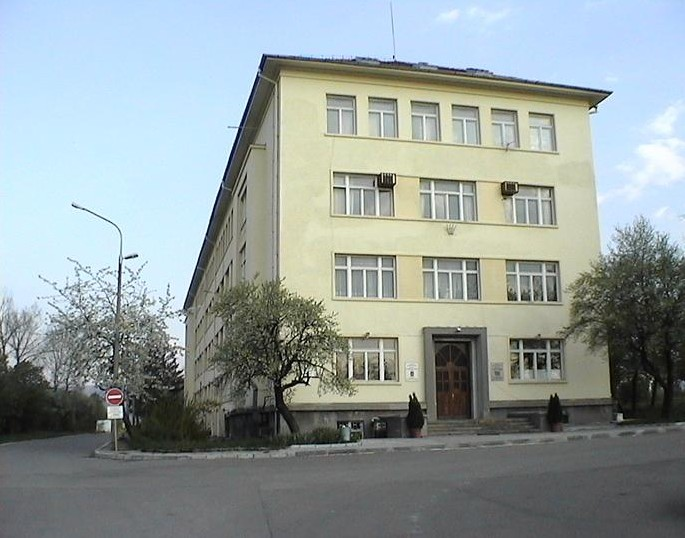
Main Building of the Institute of Solid State Physics

Institute of Solid State Physics is one of the physical institutes at the Bulgarian Academy of Sciences, currently known as the Georgi Nadjakov Institute of Solid State Physics. It provides scientific background of solid state electronics and optics in Bulgaria. Some reports and discussions are referred to below.

== History ==
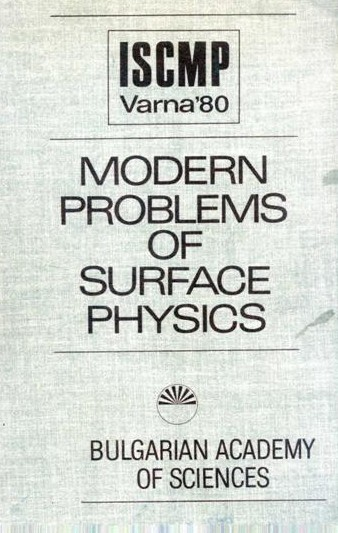
International School of Condensed Matter physics

Decree No 362 of 16 October 1972 by the Ministry Council of Bulgaria established the Institute of Solid State Physics as a successor of the Institute of Physics with Atomic Scientific Experimental Base at the Bulgarian Academy of Sciences, founded by Georgi Nadjakov in 1946. Since 16 February 1982 the Institute of Solid State Physics accepted the name "Georgi Nadjakov Institute of Solid State Physics".

Milko Borissov professor, member of BAS is the first Director and creator of the Institute of Solid State Physics (1973–1991). Nikolay Kirov, professor, D.Sc. is the second Institute Director (1991–1999). Alexander G. Petrov, Professor, D. Sc., member of BAS was director till 2015. Currently, the director of the Institute is professor Doctor of Sciences Hassan Chamati.

=== Museum ===
The Museum on the History of Physics in Bulgaria emerged in the early 1980s, when in the Institute of Solid State Physics under the guidance of Milko Borissov began documentary research on the history of physics in Bulgaria. He works with Christina Stoycheva, Penka Lazarova, and Marko Gerdjikov. Together with Vladimir Kusev and Alexander Vavrek he created Georgi Nadjakov's room museum, started by a decision of the Board of Directors of the Institute of Solid State Physics – BAS (Protocol 7 of 26 March 1981). Museum curators are Vladimir Kusev (1981–1983) and Dr. Alexander Vavrek (1983–2000). Part of the collected sources are exhibited in the National Polytechnic Museum in Sofia from 12 to 30 November 1987.

Since 2000 the Georgi Nadjakov's Museum become "Museum on History of Physics in Bulgaria" with a decision of the Scientific Council of ISSP - BAS (Protocol 22 of October 26, 2000). It is produced and adopted Rules of Procedure of the Museum (March 12, 2001).

The Museum organizers are the Union of the Physicists in Bulgaria, the Sofia branch of the Union of Physicians, and Physical Section of the Union of Scientists in Bulgaria.

Permanent exhibition dedicated to Georgi Nadjakov was established in 2006 and open to visitors.

Georgi Nadjakov's Documentary Fund has created as a result of donation his daughter Dr. Elka Nadjakov family and his son Emil Nadjakov.

The museum store documents, apparatuses and books, belonged to the Bulgarian physicists (Georgi Nadjakov, Milko Borissov, Emil Nadjakov, R. Andrejchin, D. Stoyanov, E. Leyarovski N. Pashov, J. Pacheva, K. Stamenov, J. Rangelov, L. Mladzhov, A. Vavrek, A. Peeva, V. Kusev), Quantum Electronics laboratory, as far as copies and originals mostly from books published in 19th and 20th centuries.

== Divisions ==
Theory, Material Sciences, Nanophysics, Micro- and Acousto-electronics, Low Temperature Physics, Soft Matter Physics, Laser, Atomic, Molecular and Plasma Physics are the divisions of the Institute of Solid State Physics.

=== Laboratories ===
The Institute of Solid State Physics has sixteen laboratories in the end of 2011.

==== Theoretical Department ====
Assene Datzev is a creator of the Theoretical Department in the Institute of Physics at the Bulgarian Academy of Sciences (1970).

==== Collective phenomena ====
Laboratory of Collective phenomena exist since 1994 and headed by Professor D.Sc. Dimo Usunov.

==== Electron-Phonon Interactions ====
The Laboratory of Electron-Phonon interactions is the oldest laboratory on physics at the Bulgarian Academy of Sciences. It is a successor of Georgi Nadjakov Personal Laboratory

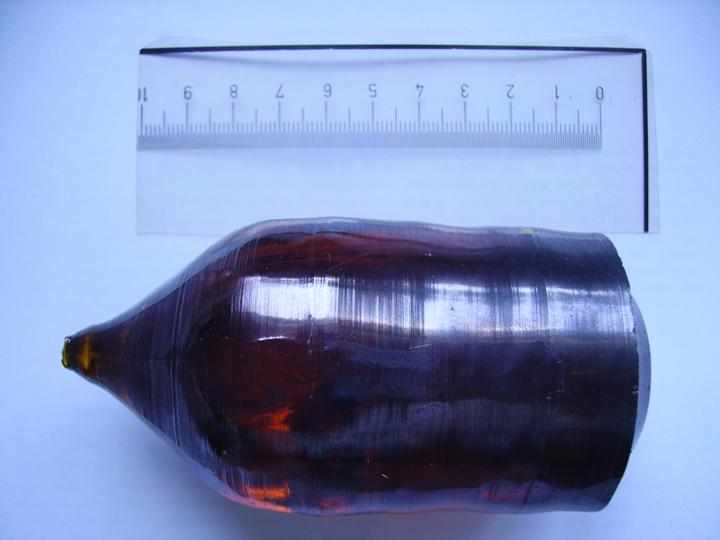
Bi12GeO20 crystal grown in ISSP by the Czochralski method

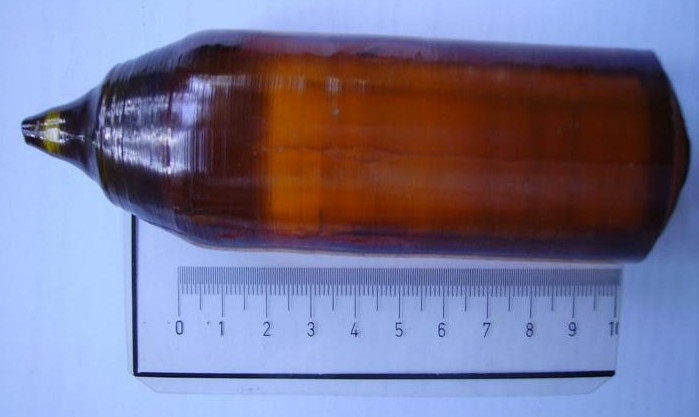
Bi12GeO20 crystal grown in ISSP by the Czochralski method

==== Crystal Growth and Structural Methods Laboratory ====
Milko Borissov initiated creation of the Laboratory of Crystal Growth and Structural Methods for the acoustoelectronic and acousto-optics investigations. Professor D.Sc. headed it since 1982

==== Biocompatible Materials Laboratory ====
Laboratory of Biocompatible Materials is a new and perspective subject.

==== Photoelectrical and Optical Phenomena in wide band gap Semiconductors Laboratory ====
Laboratory of Photoelectrical and optical phenomena in wide band gap semiconductors occurs in the Institute of Physics under the guidance of Milko Borissov in the middle of the 20th century. Laboratory managers consistently been a correspondent member Stefan Kanev, Professor Dr. Elena Vatev Professor D.Sc. Diana Nesheva.

==== Semiconductor Heterostructures Laboratory ====
Laboratory of Semiconductor heterostructures was established under the leadership of Petko Kamadzhiev, Kiro Kirov and Simeon Simeonov

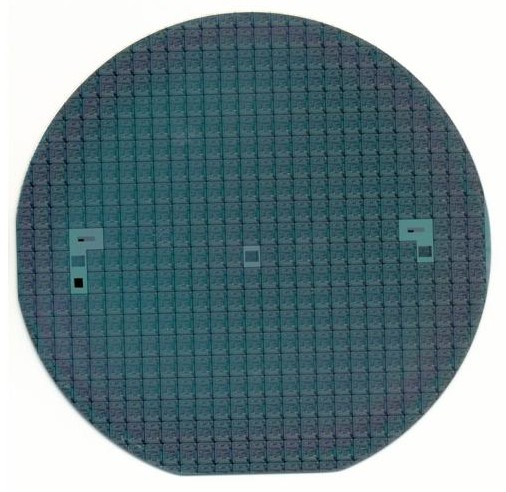
Si wafer with MOS Integrated Circuits

==== Physical Problems of Microelectronics Laboratory ====
Laboratory of Physical Problems of Microelectronics has based on the old Department "Silicon" (1959). Under the leadership of Professor Jordan Kasabov, corresponding member of BAS, the Laboratory reaches 40 people in 1967 created outside the Academy Central Institute for elements, renamed the Institute of Microelectronics and closed after 1989.

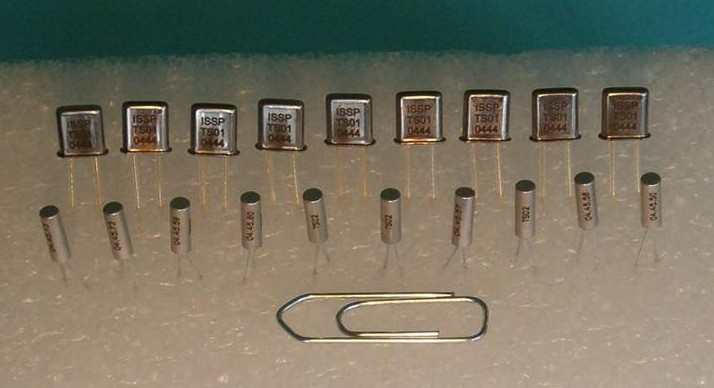
Quartz Temperature sensors

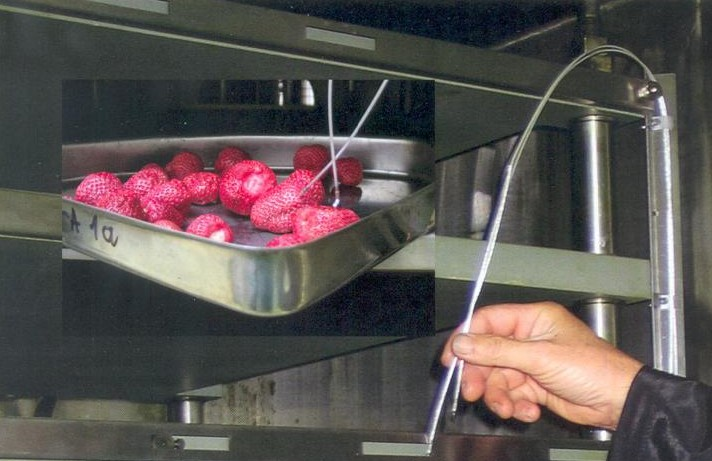
Quartz temperature sensors in a control system for food lyophilization

==== Acoustoelectronics Laboratory ====
Laboratory of Acoustoelectronics was established at the Institute for Solid State Physics, Bulgarian Academy of Sciences in 1977. Scientific research Acousto-electronics began under the leadership of Milko Borissov.

==== Low Temperature Physics Laboratory ====
Laboratory of Low-temperature physics is established at the Institute for Solid State Physics, Bulgarian Academy of Sciences by Eugene Leyarovski on July 5, 1963. Under the leadership of Professor Sazdo Ivanov an agreement has signed for establishment of the International Laboratory of Strong magnetic fields and low temperatures in Wroclaw, Poland since 1968.

==== Environmental Physics Laboratory ====
The scope of research in the environmental physics laboratory is limited, and it is, in fact, a new field.

==== Liquid Crystals Laboratory ====
Laboratory of liquid crystals is created by Professor D.Sc. Alexander Derzhanski, member of BAS since 1968.

==== Biomolecular Layers Laboratory ====
Laboratory of Biomolecular Layers exists under the guidance of Alexander G. Petrov since 1991.

==== Optics and Spectroscopy ====
The beginning of the Laboratory of optics and spectroscopy is placed by Professor Paraskeva Simova in the Physics Institute of the Bulgarian Academy of Sciences since 1951.

==== Atomic Spectroscopy Laboratory ====
Laboratory of Atomic Spectroscopy was established under the leadership of Professor Yordanka Pacheva in the early 1960s.

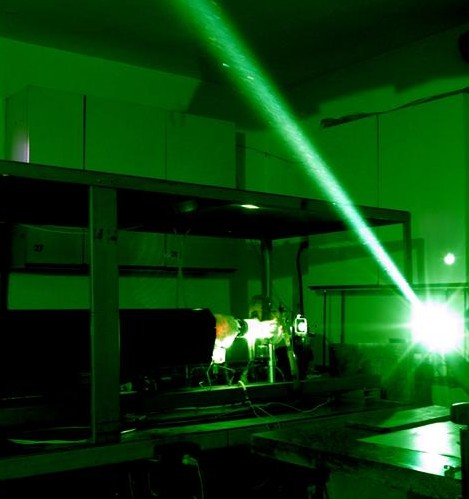
Copper bromide vapour laser, adopted for manufacturing by the companies Norseld, Australia, and Pulslight, Bulgaria. It is widely applied in medicine, industry, laser displays, etc.

==== Metal Vapour Lasers Laboratory ====
Laboratory of metal vapor lasers was established at the Institute for Solid State Physics, Bulgarian Academy of Sciences in 1987. Studies of metal vapor lasers began in 1970 with the creation of the first helium-cadmium laser. Next stage in the laboratory was placed on the creation of the first pulse laser with copper vapour in 1972. Remarkable development was made in 1974 by placing first in the world copper bromide laser, which is low-temperature version of the copper vapor laser. The laser is a Bulgarian invention that has many applications in the practical world.

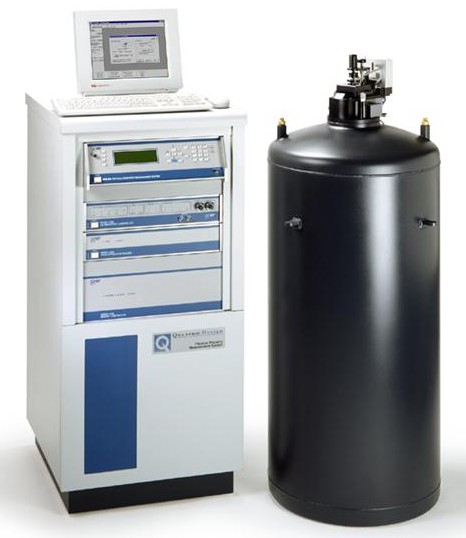
Physical properties of materials, surfaces and structures
