= Nikolay Petrov =

Nikolay or Nikolai Petrov may refer to:

- Nikolai Arnoldovich Petrov (1943–2011), Russian pianist
- Nikolay Filippovich Petrov (1872–1941), Russian painter
- Nikolai Pavlovich Petrov (1836–1920), Russian engineer
- Nikolai Petrovich Petrov (1834–1876), Russian painter
- Nikolai Vasilevich Petrov (1890–1964), theatre director
- Nikolai Vladimirovich Petrov, political scientist
- Nikolay Petrov (footballer) (born 1988), Bulgarian football player
- Nikolay Petrov (ice hockey) (born 1956), Bulgarian ice hockey player
- Nikolai Petrov (academician) (1840–1921), Russian theologist and philologist, Ukrainian academician

== See also ==
- Nikola Petrov (disambiguation)
