= Petrov (Prague-West District) =

- Municipality
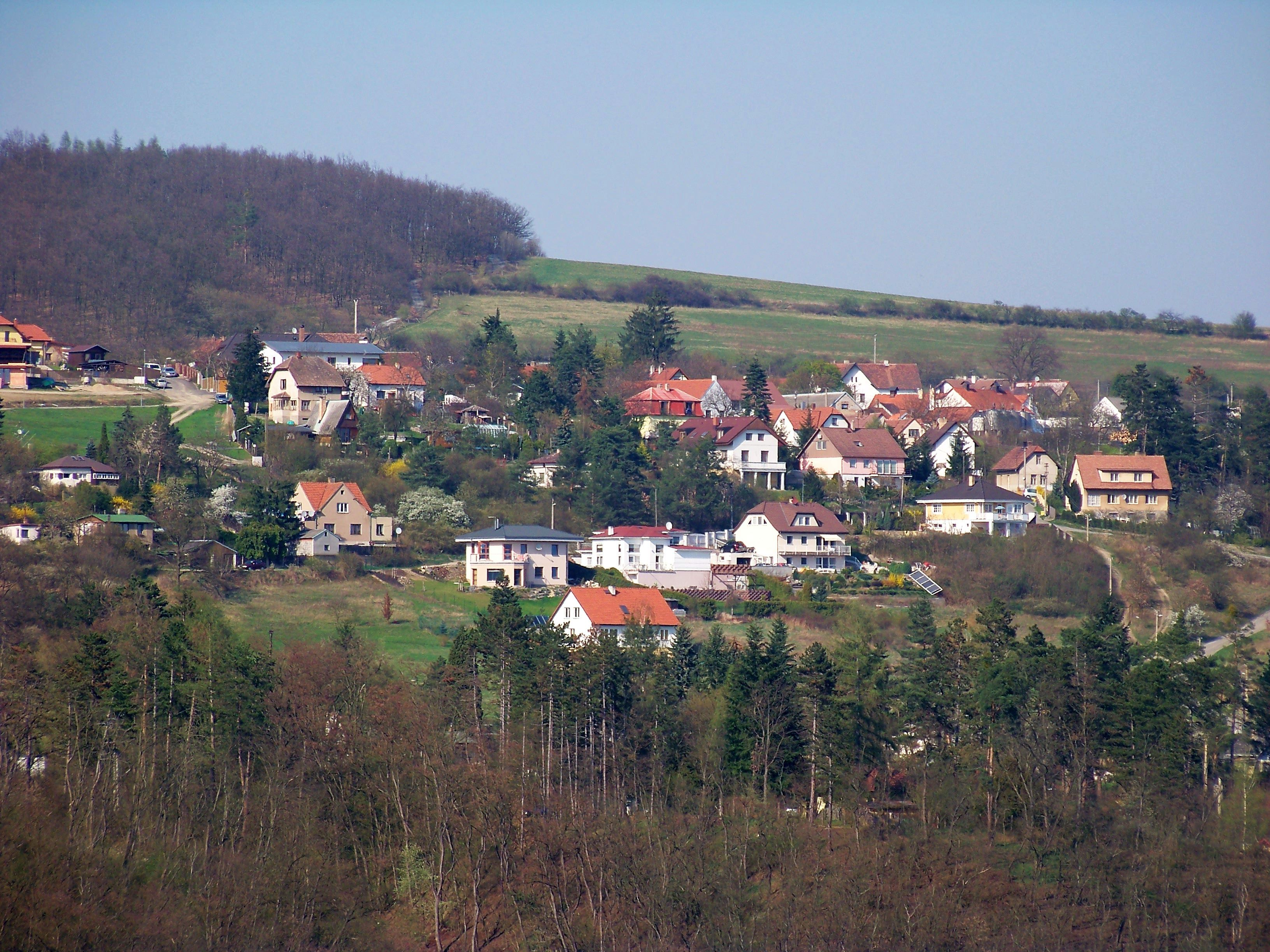
- General view

- Flag Coat of arms

- Location in the Czech Republic
- Coordinates: 49°53′11″N 14°26′2″E
- Country: Czech Republic
- Region: Central Bohemian
- District: Prague-West
- First mentioned: 1310

Area
  - Total: 11.08 km^{2} (4.28 sq mi)
- Elevation: 335 m (1,099 ft)

Population (2026-01-01)
  - Total: 841
  - Density: 75.9/km^{2} (197/sq mi)
- Time zone: UTC+1 (CET)
  - Summer (DST): UTC+2 (CEST)
- Postal codes: 252 06, 252 81, 254 01
- Website: www.petrovuprahy.cz

Petrov is a municipality and village in Prague-West District in the Central Bohemian Region of the Czech Republic. It has about 800 inhabitants.

== Administrative division ==
Petrov consists of three municipal parts (in brackets population according to the 2021 census):

- Petrov (494)
- Bohuliby (104)
- Chlomek (278)

== Etymology ==
The name is derived from the personal name Petr, meaning "Petr's (court)".

== Geography ==
Petrov is located about 15 kilometres (9 mi) south of Prague. It lies in the Benešov Uplands. The highest point is the hill U Obrázku at 446 m (1,463 ft) above sea level. The municipality is situated on the right bank of the Sázava River and on the left bank of the stream Zahořanský potok.

== History ==
The first written mention of Petrov is in a deed of Pope Clement V from 1310. The village owned changed owners. The most notable owners were William of Rosenberg, who bought Petrov in 1585, and Edward Kelley, who bought it in 1590.

== Demographics ==
Historical population

Year	Pop.	±%
1869	278	—
1880	329	+18.3%
1890	316	−4.0%
1900	304	−3.8%
1910	294	−3.3%

Year	Pop.	±%
1921	308	+4.8%
1930	357	+15.9%
1950	349	−2.2%
1961	316	−9.5%
1970	324	+2.5%

Year	Pop.	±%
1980	328	+1.2%
1991	277	−15.5%
2001	304	+9.7%
2011	615	+102.3%
2021	876	+42.4%

Source: Censuses

== Transport ==
Petrov is located on the railway line Prague–Čerčany.

== Sights ==
The only cultural monuments in the municipality are a rural homestead from the second half of the 18th century and a rural house from the end of the 18th century, both located in Bohuliby.
