= Mikhail Petrov =

Mikhail Petrov may refer to:

- Mikhail Petrov (general) (1898-1941), Soviet Red Army general
- Mikhail Petrov (colonel) (1904-1967), Soviet Army coronel and Hero of the Soviet Union
- Mikhail Petrov (rower) (born 1958), Bulgarian rower
- Mikhail Petrov (weightlifter) (1965-1993), Bulgarian weightlifter

== See also ==
- Mikhail Petrovo-Solovovo (1868–1954), Soviet Russian diplomat and psychical researcher
