= Petrov (Blansko District) =

- Municipality
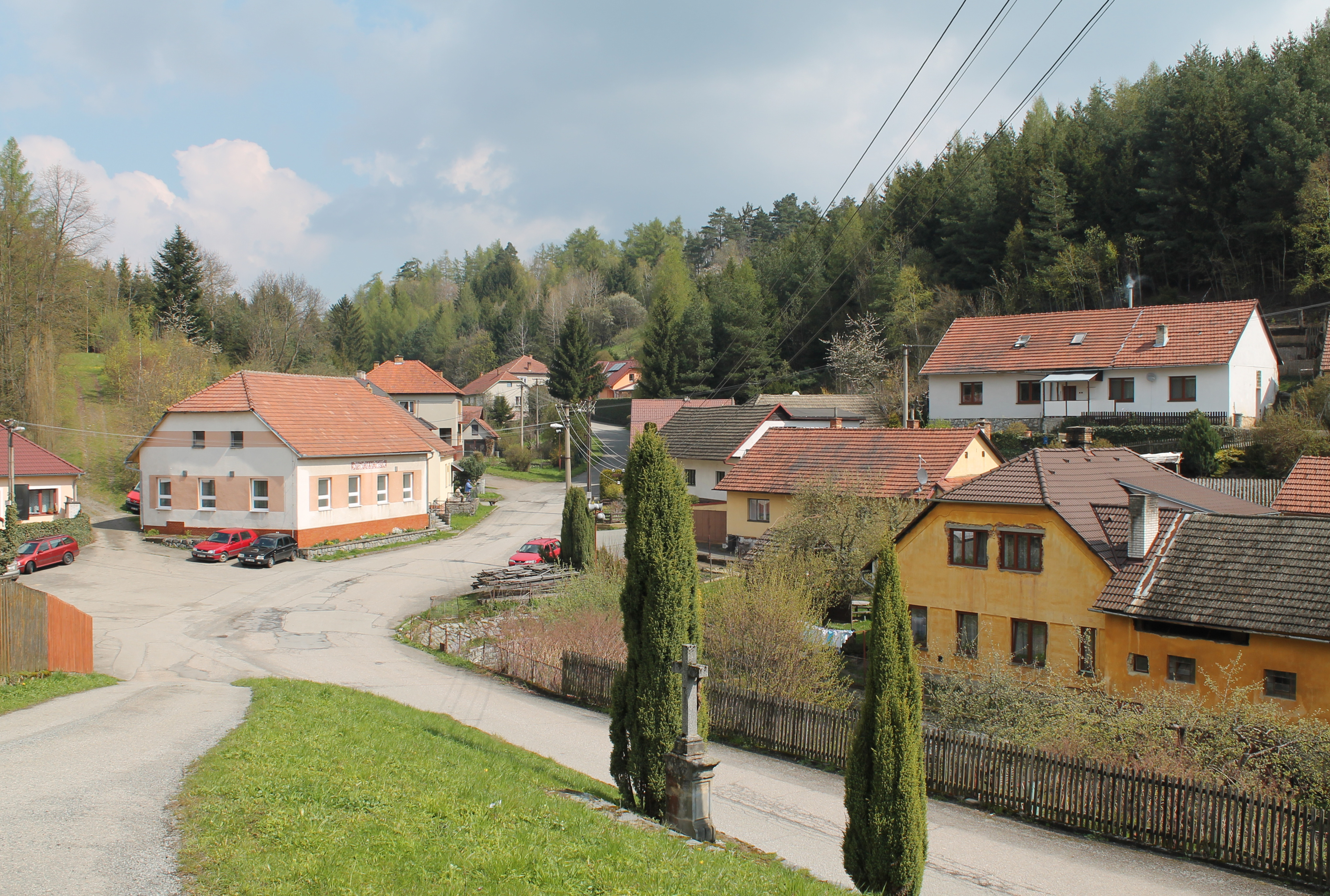
- Northern part of Petrov

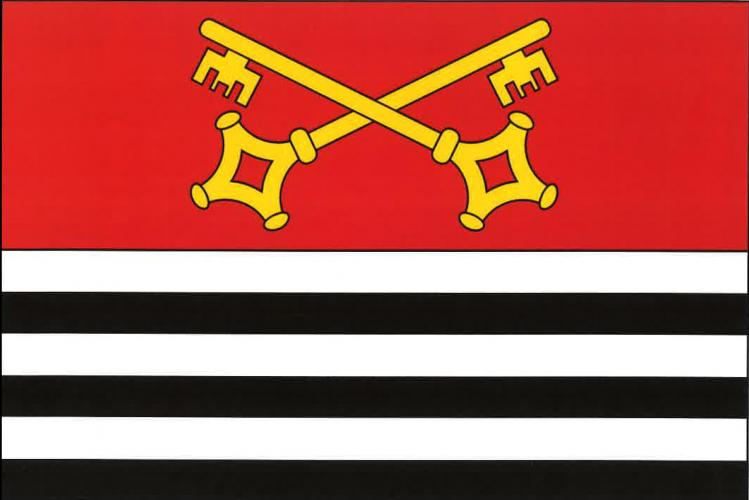
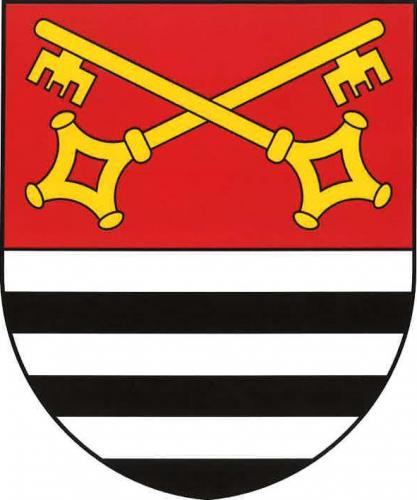
- Flag Coat of arms

- Location in the Czech Republic
- Coordinates: 49°32′1″N 16°29′23″E
- Country: Czech Republic
- Region: South Moravian
- District: Blansko
- First mentioned: 1374

Area
  - Total: 3.15 km^{2} (1.22 sq mi)
- Elevation: 515 m (1,690 ft)

Population (2026-01-01)
  - Total: 126
  - Density: 40.0/km^{2} (104/sq mi)
- Time zone: UTC+1 (CET)
  - Summer (DST): UTC+2 (CEST)
- Postal code: 679 62
- Website: www.petrov-obec.cz

Petrov is a municipality and village in Blansko District in the South Moravian Region of the Czech Republic. It has about 100 inhabitants.

Petrov lies approximately 23 kilometres (14 mi) north-west of Blansko, 39 km (24 mi) north of Brno, and 161 km (100 mi) south-east of Prague.

== Demographics ==
Historical population
Year	Pop.	±%
1869	232	—
1880	260	+12.1%
1890	276	+6.2%
1900	242	−12.3%
1910	228	−5.8%
1921	248	+8.8%
1930	242	−2.4%
1950	206	−14.9%
1961	221	+7.3%
1970	192	−13.1%
1980	183	−4.7%
1991	160	−12.6%
2001	150	−6.2%
2011	143	−4.7%
2021	128	−10.5%
Source: Censuses
