= Alexander G. Petrov =

Bulgarian physicist (1948–2024)

- Александър Г. Петров
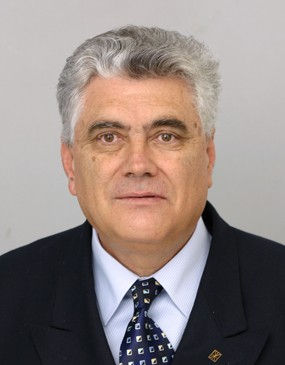
- Petrov in 2009
- Born: Alexander Georgiev Petrov; 27 May 1948; Stara Zagora, Bulgaria
- Died: 22 September 2024 (aged 76)
- Education: Sofia University (MS, 1970); Institute of Solid State Physics (Ph.D., 1974)
- Parents: Georgi Petrov (father); Zlatka Kimrianova (mother)
- Scientific career
- Fields: Physics
- Workplaces: Institute of Solid State Physics

Alexander Georgiev Petrov (Bulgarian: Александър Георгиев Петров; 27 May 1948 – 22 September 2024) was a Bulgarian professor of physics and a Fellow of the Bulgarian Academy of Sciences.

== Biography ==
Petrov was born in Stara Zagora, Bulgaria on 27 May 1948. He had a master's degree in atomic physics from the Sofia University (1970) and held a Ph.D. on liquid crystals from the Institute of Solid State Physics (1974). He received a Doctor of Sciences (D.Sc.) degree in 1987, a full Professorship in 1990 and was elected a Fellow of the Bulgarian Academy of Sciences in 2003.

Petrov died on 22 September 2024, at the age of 76.

== Area ==
The main area of his research was soft matter physics (liquid crystals, biophysics, biomolecular electronics and nanophysics). He worked in the Institute of Solid State Physics at the Bulgarian Academy of Sciences.

== Research ==
Petrov investigated theoretically and experimentally dielectric, elastic, flexoelectric and surface properties of nematic liquid crystals with different types of molecular asymmetry. This achievement has applications in liquid-crystal optoelectronics. In the living matter physics he created the knowledge of bioflexoelectricity, including a new theoretical model for description of the elasticity and flexoelectricity of biological membranes from the general molecular asymmetry point of view.

He discovered gradient flexoelectric effect in nematic liquid crystals under the action of inhomogeneous electric fields (1971–1974); flexoelectric oscillations in nematic liquid crystals (1975–1979); direct flexoeffect in biological membrane with ion channels (1988–1993); helielectricity in chiral lyotropic lipid phases (aqueous and nonaqueous) (1988–1989); inverse flexoeffect of bilayer lipid membranes (1993); photoflexoeffect in photo-active membranes (1992–1994).

== Professional experience ==
- Director of the Institute of Solid State Physics at the Bulgarian Academy of Sciences (since 1999 up to 2015)
- Head of Biomolecular Layers Laboratory, ISSP-BAS (1991–2008)
- Petrov was a Head of Soft Matter Physics Division of ISSP-BAS (since 2006 up to 2016).

== Awards ==
Petrov was awarded the Freedericksz Medal for outstanding contributions in the field of liquid crystal physics by the Russian Liquid Crystal Society (2004), the Outstanding Contribution to Science Annual Award of the Ministry of Education and Science of Bulgaria (Scientist of the year 2007) and the Marin Drinov Sign of Honour of Bulgarian Academy of Sciences on a ribbon (2008).

== Publications ==
=== Monograph ===
- Alexander G. Petrov (1999). The Lyotropic State of Matter. Molecular Physics and Living Matter Physics. Gordon & Breach Science Publishers, L.-N.J. ISBN 9789056996383.

=== Selected papers ===
- А.G. Petrov, Y. G. Marinov, H.P. Hinov, L. Todorova, M. Dencheva-Zarkova, S. Sridevi, P.M. Rafailov, U. Dettlaff-Weglikowska, Observation of Flexoelectricity in a Mixture of Carbon Single Walled Nanotubes with a Nematic Liquid Crystal, Mol. Cryst. Liq. Cryst. 545, no.1, pp. 58/[1282]-66/[1290] (2011).
- Alexander G.Petrov, Y. G. Marinov, G.B. Hadjichristov, S. Sridevi, Uma S. Hiremath, C.V. Yelamaggad, and S. Krishna Prasad, New Photoactive Guest-Host Nematics Showing Photoflexoelectricity, Mol.Cryst.Liq.Cryst. 544, no.1, pp 3/[991]-13/[1001] (2011).
- Converse Flexoelectric Effect in Bent-Core Nematic Liquid Crystals, Pramoda Kumar, Y.G.Marinov, H. P. Hinov, Uma S. Hiremath, C. V.Yelamaggad, K.S. Krishnamurthy, and A. G. Petrov, J. Phys. Chem. B 113, 9168–9174 (2009)
- Chirality of lipids makes fluid lamellar phases piezoelectric, John Harden, Nicholas Diorio, Alexander G. Petrov, Antal Jakli, Phys Rev E 79, 011701 (2009)
- Membrane Electromechanics in Biology, with a Focus on Hearing, F. Sachs, W.E. Brownell, and A.G. Petrov, MRS Bulletin 34, 665–670 (2009).
- A. G.Petrov, Flexoelectricity: a universal sensoric mechanism in biomembranes and chem.-biosensors, In: Functionalized Nanoscale Materials, Devices and Systems, A.Vaseashta and I.N.Mihailescu Eds., Springer (2008), pp. 87–100.
- A. G. Petrov, Y. Marinov, S. D’Elia, S. Marino, C. Versace, N. Scaramuzza, Dielectric and flexoelectric oscillations in PDLC studied by flexoelectric spectroscopy and laser light diffraction, J.Optoelec.Adv. Mat. 9, 420 – 423 (2007)
- Alexander G. Petrov, Flexoelectricity and mechanotransduction (Invited Review), In: Current Topics in Membranes, vol. 58: Mechanosensitive channels, O.P. Hamil, Ed., Elsevier/Academic Press (2007), pp. 121–150.
- Alexander G. Petrov, Electricity and mechanics of biomembrane systems: Flexoelectricity in living мembranes (Invited Review), Anal.Chim.Acta, 568, 70–83 (2006)
- A. G. Petrov, Present state of the generalized molecular asymmetry model in liquid crystal physics, Bulg. J. Phys. 31, 1–27 (2004)
- A. G. Petrov, Mechanoelectric properties of BLMs, Chapter 6 in: Planar Lipid Bilayers (BLMs) and their Applications, Eds. HT Tien and A. Ottova, Elsevier Science, Amsterdam and New York, 2003, pp. 205–238
- A. G. Petrov, Flexoelectricity of model and living membranes, Biochim. Biophys. Acta - Review on Biomembranes 1561, 1–25 (2002)
- A. G. Petrov, F. Sachs, Flexoelectricity and elasticity of asymmetric biomembranes, Phys. Rev. E 65, 21905-10 (2002)
- A.G. Petrov, A new generation of surface-driven liquid crystal displays, Materials for Information Technology in the New Millennium, Eds. J.M. Marshall et al., Bookcraft, Bath (2001) pp. 74–81.
- A.G. Petrov, Measurements and interpretation of flexoelectricity (Invited review), Physical Properties of Liquid Crystals vol. 25, 251–264 (2001), EMIS Datareviews Series, Inst. Electrical Engineers, UK,
- A.G. Petrov, H. Schmiedel, U. Kühnau, Polar surface interactions vs. long range interactions in the problem of nematic anchoring, Mol.Cryst.Liq.Cryst, 329, 349–356 (1999)
- A.G. Petrov, Liquid crystal physics and the physics of living matter, Mol.Cryst.Liq.Cryst. 332, 577–584 (1999)
- A.G. Petrov, Flexoelectricity and ion channels: a confirmation of the flexoelectric model for ion transport, Cell.& Molec.Biol.Lett. 2, suppl. 1, 231–253 (1997)
- Flexoelectricity and photoflexoelectricity in model and biomembranes, A.G. Petrov, M. Spassova, J.H. Fendler, Thin Solid Films 284–285, 845–848 (1996)
- Photoflexoelectric effects in bilayer lipid membranes, M. Spassova, A.G. Petrov, J.H. Fendler, J.Phys.Chem. 99, 9485–9490 (1995)
- Flexoelectricity of charged and dipolar bilayer lipid membranes studied by stroboscopic interferometry, A.Todorov, A.G.Petrov, J.H.Fendler, Langmuir 10, 2344 2350 (1994)
- First observation of the converse flexoelectric effect in bilayer lipid membranes, A.Todorov, A.G.Petrov, J.H.Fendler, J.Phys.Chem. 98, 3076 3079 (1994)
- Flexoelectric effects in model and native membranes containing ion channels, A.G.Petrov, B.A.Miller, K.Hristova, P.N.R.Usherwood, Eur.Biophys.J. 22, 289 300 (1993)
- Electrical and real time stroboscopic interferometric measurements of bilayer lipid membrane flexoelectricity, A.T.Todorov, A.G.Petrov, M.O.Brandt, J.H. Fendler, Langmuir 7, 3127 3137 (1991).
- Manifestations of ferroelectricity in lyotropics with chiral additives: Biomembranes' analogs, A.G.Petrov, A.T.Todorov, B.Bonev, L.M. Blinov, S.V.Yablonski, D.B. Subachyus, N. Tsvetkova, Ferroelectrics 114, 415 427 (1991).
- Curvature electric effects in artificial and natural membranes studied using patch clamp techniques, A. G. Petrov, R. L. Ramsey, P. N. R. Usherwood, Eur. Biophys. J. 17, 13 17 (1989).
- Curvature electric effect in black lipid membranes, A. G. Petrov, V.S. Sokolov, Eur. Biophys. J. 13, 139 (1986).
- Elastic and flexoelectric aspects of out of plane fluctuations in biological and model membranes, A.G.Petrov, I. Bivas, Progress in Surface Sci., Ed. S. Davison, 16, 389 512 (1984)
- Principles and methods of liquid crystal physics applied to the structure and functions of biological membranes, A. G. Petrov, S. A. Seleznev, A. Derzhanski, Acta. Phys. Polonica A55, 385 405 (1979).
- Flexoelectric model for active transport, A. G. Petrov, In: Physical and Chemical Bases of Biological Information Transfer, Plenum Press, N.Y. L. (1975) p. 111.
- А. Г. Петров, Молекулна физика и биофизични аспекти на лиотропното течнокристално състояние на веществото, DSc thesis (1987)
- А. Г. Петров, Електрическа поляризация на нематичните течни кристали: диелектрични и флексоелектрични свойства, PhD thesis, (1974)
