= Georgi Petrov =

Georgi Petrov may refer to:

- Georgi Petrov (judoka) (born 1954), former Bulgarian judoka
- Georgi Petrov (badminton) (born 1980), Bulgarian badminton player
- Georgi Petrov (footballer, born 1974), former Bulgarian footballer
- Georgi Petrov (ice hockey) (born 1988), Kazakh ice hockey player
