= Aleksandr Petrov (footballer, born 1893) =

Russian footballer

Alexsandar Petrov
Personal information
- Full name: Alexsandar Petrov
- Date of birth: 1893
- Place of birth: Moscow, Russian Empire
- Date of death: 1942 (aged 48–49)
- Position: Striker

Senior career*
Years	Team	Apps	(Gls)
1911–1913	KFS Moscow		
1915–1922	KFS Moscow		
1923	Dinamo Moscow		

International career
1914	Russian Empire	1	(0)
- * Club domestic league appearances and goals

Alexsandar Petrov (Russian: Александр Петров) (1893–1942) was an association football player.

== International career ==
Petrov played his only game for Russia on 5 July 1914 in a friendly against Sweden.
