= Alexei Petrov (ice hockey) =

Russian ice hockey player

- Born: 1 February 1983 (age 42); Ukhta, Soviet Union
- Height: 1.84 m (6 ft 0 in)
- Weight: 101 kg (223 lb; 15 st 13 lb)
- Position: Defence
- Shoots: Left
- KHL team Former teams: Free Agent; HC Neftekhimik Nizhnekamsk; Krylya Sovetov Moscow; Khimik Voskresensk; SKA Saint Petersburg; Torpedo Nizhny Novgorod; Atlant Moscow Oblast; HC Sochi; Traktor Chelyabinsk
- Playing career: 2001–present

Alexei Petrov (Russian: Алексей Петров; born 1 February 1983 in Ukhta) is a Russian professional ice hockey defenceman.

== Career ==
Petrov made his Russian Superleague debut playing with HC Neftekhimik Nizhnekamsk during the 2002–03 season. An unrestricted free agent, he most recently played with HC Sochi of the Kontinental Hockey League (KHL).

== Career statistics ==
			Regular season					Playoffs
Season	Team	League	GP	G	A	Pts	PIM	GP	G	A	Pts	PIM
2001–02	HC Lipetsk	RUS-2	45	6	8	14	68	—	—	—	—	—
2002–03	Neftekhimik Nizhnekamsk	RSL	31	0	3	3	18	—	—	—	—	—
2003–04	Neftyanik Leninogorsk	RUS-2	44	0	4	4	136	—	—	—	—	—
2003–04	Dizel Penza	RUS-2	7	0	0	0	12	—	—	—	—	—
2004–05	Krylya Sovetov Moscow	RUS-2	50	5	7	12	94	3	1	0	1	8
2005–06	Krylya Sovetov Moscow	RUS-2	41	4	7	11	74	17	0	1	1	34
2006–07	Krylya Sovetov Moscow	RSL	30	3	11	14	77	—	—	—	—	—
2006–07	Neftekhimik Nizhnekamsk	RSL	7	1	1	2	6	—	—	—	—	—
2007–08	Neftekhimik Nizhnekamsk	RSL	38	2	2	4	75	—	—	—	—	—
2008–09	Khimik Voskresensk	KHL	41	3	5	8	134	—	—	—	—	—
2008–09	SKA Saint Petersburg	KHL	9	1	4	5	12	1	0	0	0	2
2009–10	SKA Saint Petersburg	KHL	40	4	6	10	89	—	—	—	—	—
2010–11	SKA Saint Petersburg	KHL	16	0	2	2	16	—	—	—	—	—
2011–12	SKA Saint Petersburg	KHL	32	0	2	2	30	—	—	—	—	—
2011–12	Torpedo Nizhny Novgorod	KHL	13	0	2	2	20	9	1	0	1	10
2012–13	Atlant Moscow Oblast	KHL	29	1	3	4	10	5	0	0	0	6
2013–14	Atlant Moscow Oblast	KHL	45	0	4	4	36	—	—	—	—	—
2014–15	HC Sochi	KHL	22	0	0	0	24	—	—	—	—	—
2014–15	Traktor Chelyabinsk	KHL	9	0	0	0	6	3	0	0	0	4
2015–16	Traktor Chelyabinsk	KHL	60	5	7	12	85	—	—	—	—	—
2016–17	Traktor Chelyabinsk	KHL	59	4	8	12	71	6	1	0	1	6
2017–18	Traktor Chelyabinsk	KHL	48	0	3	3	24	16	0	3	3	50
2018–19	Traktor Chelyabinsk	KHL	43	0	7	7	47	4	0	2	2	27
2019–20	HC Sochi	KHL	50	1	6	7	80	—	—	—	—	—
KHL totals			516	19	59	78	684	44	2	5	7	105
