= Antonín Petrof =

- Born: 15 August 1839; Hradec Králové, Austrian Empire
- Died: 9 September 1915 (aged 76); Hradec Králové, Austria-Hungary
- Occupation: piano maker
- Known for: A. Petrof / Petrof Pianos

Antonín Petrof (15 August 1839 – 9 September 1915) was a Czech entrepreneur and piano maker.

== Biography ==
In 1857, when Petrof was 18 years old, he was visited by his maternal uncle Jan Heitzmann at his family's Hradec Králové home. Heitzmann and his partner Hölzl were already recognized piano manufacturers in [Vienna]. Petrof learned the trade in Vienna and in 1864 returned to Bohemia, where he built his first piano. In 1865 he transformed his father's cabinetry enterprise in the old town square, behind the Cathedral of the Holy Spirit, into a piano-making workshop.

In 1866, a few months before the enveloping Battle of Königgrätz, Petrof registered his company, A. Petrof. After a brief compulsory interruption, during which the Kingdom of Prussia defeated the Austrian Empire, production resumed. In 1874 his company relocated to new premises on the outskirts of Hradec Králové.

The company grew, and in 1880 an auxiliary factory opened in Temesvár, Austria-Hungary (today Timișoara, Romania). A year later, in 1881, Petrof premiered his own keyboard and mechanical design. In 1883, production of the piano began.

In 1894–95 the first instruments were exported, and A. Petrof was quickly able to establish itself. A warehouse and Comptoir were opened in Vienna. Clients included the nobility and the imperial court. By the early 20th century, A. Petrof was the largest piano manufacturer in the monarchy.

By the time of Petrof's 1915 death, the company was supplying living rooms, concert halls and royal families across Europe. Its 30,000th piano had been delivered to Archduke Franz Ferdinand, heir to the Austro-Hungarian Empire, two weeks before his assassination.

In 2008 the company began making luxury furniture, using the same skills and techniques used to build grand pianos, in an effort to branch out and dodge ingravescent effects of the 2008 financial crisis. Since that time, production has settled at 50% pianos, 50% furniture. Such diversification is characteristic of a survival strategy that has seen Petrof through two world wars and the Nazi invasion, as well as 40 years of the communist regime, during which, following forced nationalisation in 1948, it was incorporated into the state concern "Piano and Organ Factory". Under communist rule, though factory installations were expanded and production figures increased, instrument quality concomitantly declined. The current company president and Antonín Petrof’s great-great-granddaughter, Zuzana Ceralová Petrofová, was among tens of thousands of peaceful protesters who successfully demanded an end to the communist regime in 1989. "During the 1930s crisis Petrof manufactured wooden railway sleepers," says Ms. Ceralová Petrofová, "and during World War II it focused on grenade boxes."
