= Yevgeny Petrov =

Yevgeny Petrov may refer to:

- Evgeni Petrov (cyclist) (born 1978), Russian cyclist
- Yevgeny Petrov (athlete), Russian runner in the men's 1500 metres at the 1912 Summer Olympics
- Yevgeni Petrov (sport shooter) (1938–2025), Soviet sport shooter
- Yevgeny Petrov (writer) (1902–1942), Soviet writer
- Evgeny Petrov (sledge hockey) (born 1990), Russian sledge hockey player
- Yevgeny Petrov (serial killer) (born 1975), Russian serial killer, rapist and pedophile
