= St. Petersburg Union of Composers =

Russian musical association

The St. Petersburg Union of Composers, (Soyuz Kompositorov- Russian: Союз композиторов) is a professional and creative musical association with its headquarters at the former mansion of the Princess Vera F. Gagarina at 45 Bolshaya Morskaya Street, St Petersburg, Russia. It is a Department of the Union of Composers of the Russian Federation, formerly the Union of Soviet Composers.

== History ==
The St. Petersburg Union of Composers was founded in 1932. Amongst its members in its first decade of existence were composers including B.V. Asafyev, V.M. Bogdanov-Berezovsky, A.P. Gladkovsky, V.M. Deshevovov, A.F. Pashchenko, Oles' Semyenovich Chishko, Y.A. Shaporin, D.D. Shostakovich, and young musicians B.A. Arapov, B.G. Holz, I.I. Dzerzhinsky, Y.V. Kochurov, V.V. Pushkov, G.N. Popov, V.P. Solovyev-Sedoy, M.I. Chulaki.

Chairmen of the Union have been: the musicologist B.A. Fingert, as first chairman; V.V. Shcherbachev (1935–37, 1944–48), I.O. Dunaevsky (1937–43), D.D. Shostakovich (1946–47), Chulaki (1947–48), Solovyev-Sedoy (1948–64), A.P. Petrov (1964-2006) and Grigory Korchmar (from 2006). In 2003 the Petersburg Department of the Union of Composers had more than 210 members.

== Location ==
In the 1930s, the Leningrad Department of the Union of Composers was located at 2 Rossi Street. It moved in 1948 to its present location at 45 Bolshaya Morskaya Street.
