= Petrof =

Czech piano manufacturer

Coordinates: 50°11′31.75″N 15°51′3.33″E

- Industry: Musical instruments
- Founded: 1864
- Founder: Antonín Petrof
- Headquarters: Hradec Králové, Czech Republic
- Area served: Worldwide
- Key people: Zuzana Ceralová Petrofová
- Products: Grand and upright pianos
- Production output: Yearly around 100 new grand pianos and 500 uprights
- Revenue: 202,063,000 Czech koruna (2023)
- Number of employees: c. 110
- Website: petrof.com

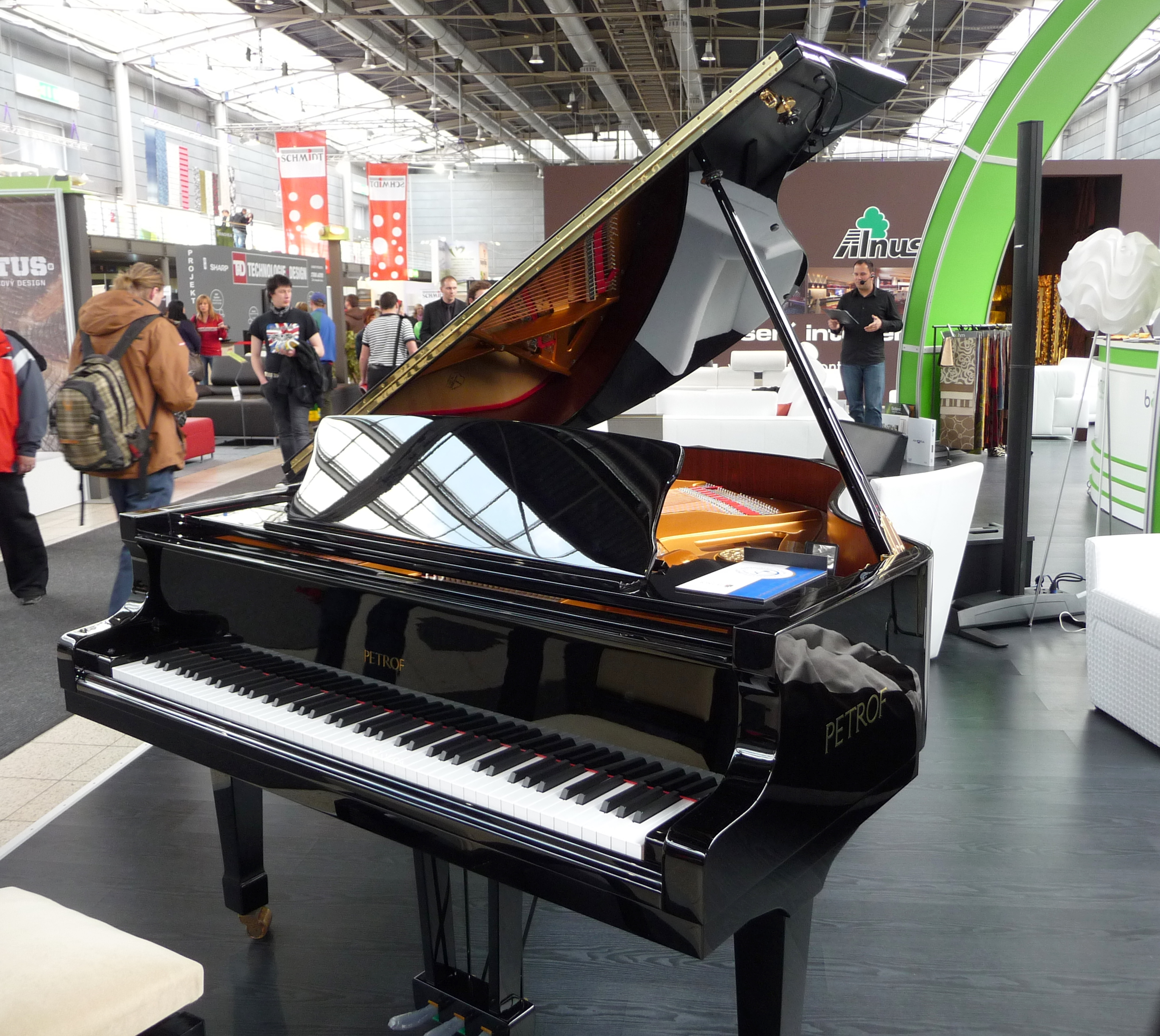
Petrof Grand Piano at exhibition

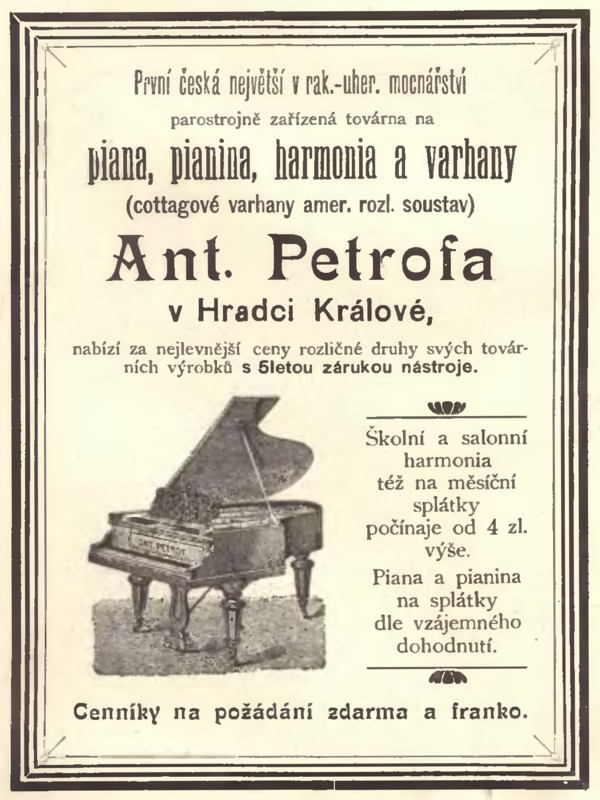
1895 ad for Petrof pianos

Petrof is a Czech piano manufacturer founded in 1864. It is a leading European piano manufacturer, exporting to more than 60 countries.

== History ==
The company was founded in 1864 in Hradec Králové, Empor Österreich, by Antonín Petrof (d. 1915), who had apprenticed at Wenes companies such as Heintzman & Co., Friedrich Ehrbar and Schweighofer.

The owner Antonín Petrof was awarded an imperial and royal warrant of appointment to the court of Austria-Hungary. In 1924 the company was exporting its pianos to Europe, Japan, China, Australia and South America.

At the World Exhibition 1934 in Brussels, the Petrof instruments won the gold medal. At that time, approximately 400 people worked at their factory.

After the 1948 Czechoslovak coup d'état, the company was nationalized.

In 1991, the company was returned to the Petrof family. Petrof is currently led by two sisters from the fifth generation of the Petrof family and produces annually approximately 100 grand pianos and 500 upright pianos. Petrof is known for several innovations, such as ways to adjust the mechanics and particularly pressure point through magnetic systems.

After 1993, the piano company G. Rösler of Česká Lípa, Bohemia, was acquired.

== Notable performers ==
Petrof pianos have been used by many famous musicians, including among others: Ray Charles, Paul McCartney, Arturo Benedetti Michelangeli, Sviatoslav Richter, Count Basie, Richard Clayderman, Ennio Morricone, Renato Carosone and Mark Levinson.

== Models ==
=== Grand pianos ===
Current grand piano models:

- Master series
  - P 284 Mistral: 284 cm (9 ft 3 3/4 in)
  - P 237 Monsoon: 237 cm (7 ft 9 1/4 in)
  - P 210 Pasat: 210 cm (6 ft 10 3/4 in)
- Standard series
  - P 194 Storm: 194 cm (6 ft 4 1/2 in)
  - P 173 Breeze: 173 cm (5 ft 8 in)
  - P 159 Bora: 159 cm (5 ft 2 1/2 in)

=== Upright pianos ===
Current upright piano models:

- Highest series
  - P 135 K1: 135 cm (4 ft 5 1/4 in)
  - P 131 M1: 131 cm (4 ft 3 1/2 in)
- Higher series
  - P 125 G1: 125 cm (4 ft 1 1/4 in)
  - P 125 F1: 125 cm (4 ft 1 1/4 in)
  - P 125 K1: 125 cm (4 ft 1 1/4 in)
  - P 125 M1: 125 cm (4 ft 1 1/4 in)
  - P 122 N2: 122 cm (4 ft 0 in)
  - P 122 H1: 122 cm (4 ft 0 in)
- Middle series
  - P 118 P1: 118 cm (3 ft 10 1/2 in)
  - P 118 M1: 118 cm (3 ft 10 1/2 in)
  - P 118 S1: 118 cm (3 ft 10 1/2 in)
