= Athletics at the 2000 Summer Olympics – Men's 4 × 100 metres relay =

The men's 4 × 100 metres relay races at the 2000 Summer Olympics as part of the athletics program were held on Friday 29 September and Saturday 30 September.

The top two teams in each of the initial five heats automatically qualified for the semi-final. The next six fastest team from across the heats also qualified. The top three teams in each of the semi-finals automatically qualified for the final. The next two fastest team from the semi-finals also qualified.

As of 2028, this is the last time the U.S. team won the men's 4 x 100 meters relay in track & field.

== Records ==
These were the standing world and Olympic records (in seconds) prior to the 2000 Summer Olympics.

World Record	37.40	(United States) Michael Marsh (United States) Leroy Burrell (United States) Dennis Mitchell (United States) Carl Lewis	Barcelona (ESP)	8 August 1992
World Record	37.40	(United States) Jon Drummond (United States) Andre Cason (United States) Dennis Mitchell (United States) Leroy Burrell	Stuttgart (GER)	21 August 1993
Olympic Record	37.40	(United States) Michael Marsh (United States) Leroy Burrell (United States) Dennis Mitchell (United States) Carl Lewis	Barcelona (ESP)	8 August 1992

== Medalists ==
Gold:	Silver:	Bronze:
United States; Kenneth Brokenburr*; Jon Drummond; Maurice Greene; Brian Lewis; Tim Montgomery*; Bernard Williams	Brazil; André da Silva; Claudinei da Silva; Vicente de Lima; Édson Ribeiro; Cláudio Roberto Souza*	Cuba; José Ángel César; Iván García; Freddy Mayola; Luis Alberto Pérez-Rionda

* Athletes who participated in the heats only and received medals.

== Results ==
All times shown are in seconds.

- Q denotes qualification by place in heat.
- q denotes qualification by overall place.
- DNS denotes did not start.
- DNF denotes did not finish.
- DQ denotes disqualification.
- NR denotes national record.
- AR denotes area/continental record.
- OR denotes Olympic record.
- WR denotes world record.
- PB denotes personal best.
- SB denotes season best.

=== Heats ===
Heat 1 of 5 Date: Friday 29 September 2000
Place		Nation	Athletes	Lane	Reaction	Time	Qual.	Record
Heat	Overall	Nation	Athletes	Lane	Reaction	Time	Qual.	Record
1	11	Ivory Coast	Eric Pacôme N'Dri, Ahmed Douhou, Yves Sonan, Ibrahim Meité	7	0.342 s	39.06 s	Q	
2	13	Thailand	Kongdech Natenee, Vissanu Sophanich, Boonyarit Phuksachat, Sittichai Suwonprateep	3	0.196 s	39.13 s	Q	
3	19	Guatemala	Rolando Blanco, Oscar Meneses, José Meneses, José Tinoco	6	0.181 s	39.34 s		
4	23	Bahamas	Renward Wells, Dominic Demeritte, Iram Lewis, Wellington Saunders Whymms	2	0.139 s	39.57 s		
5	25	Cyprus	Anthimos Rotos, Anninos Marcoullides, Prodromos Katsantonis, Yiannakis Zisimides	4	0.460 s	39.75 s		
6	31	FR Yugoslavia	Slobodan Spasić, Predrag Momirović, Miloš Šakić, Milan Petaković	8	0.245 s	39.99 s		
7	35	India	Thirugnan Durai, Rajeev Bala Krishnan, Ajay Raj Singh, Anil Kumar Prakash	5	0.151 s	40.23 s		
8		Great Britain	Allyn Condon, Jason Gardener, Marlon Devonish, Dwain Chambers	1	0.175 s	DQ		

Heat 2 of 5 Date: Friday 29 September 2000
Place		Nation	Athletes	Lane	Reaction	Time	Qual.	Record
Heat	Overall	Nation	Athletes	Lane	Reaction	Time	Qual.	Record
1	2	Brazil	Vicente de Lima, Édson Ribeiro, André da Silva, Cláudio Roberto Souza	8	0.153 s	38.32 s	Q	
2	7	Italy	Francesco Scuderi, Alessandro Cavallaro, Maurizio Checcucci, Andrea Colombo	5	0.429 s	38.84 s	Q	SB
3	8	Nigeria	Uchenna Emedolu, Nnamdi Anusim, Sunday Emmanuel, Deji Aliu	4	0.175 s	38.85 s	q	SB
4	9	Jamaica	Donovan Powell, Dwight Thomas, Lindel Frater, Llewellyn Bredwood	3	0.220 s	38.97 s	q	
5	15	Slovenia	Matic Šušteršič, Matic Osovnikar, Boštjan Fridrih, Urban Acman	6	0.146 s	39.25 s	q	NR
6	27	Liberia	Kouty Mawenh, Sayon Cooper, Andrew Reyes, Koiyan Morlu	7	0.175 s	39.77 s		NR
7	33	Hong Kong	William To, Ho Kwan Lung, Tang Hon Sing, Chiang Wai Hung	2	0.182 s	40.15 s		
8	34	Chile	Diego Valdés, Ricardo Roach, Rodrigo Roach, Juan Pablo Faúndez	1	0.161 s	40.20 s		

Heat 3 of 5 Date: Friday 29 September 2000
Place		Nation	Athletes	Lane	Reaction	Time	Qual.	Record
Heat	Overall	Nation	Athletes	Lane	Reaction	Time	Qual.	Record
1	10	France	Frédéric Krantz, David Patros, Christophe Cheval, Jérôme Eyana	5	0.163 s	39.00 s	Q	
2	14	Greece	Georgios Theodoridis, Konstadinos Kederis, Alexios Alexopoulos, Aggelos Pavlakakis	2	0.236 s	39.21 s	Q	
3	16T	Canada	Bradley McCuaig, Glenroy Gilbert, Pierre Browne, Nicolas Macrozonaris	6	0.458 s	39.26 s	q	SB
3	16T	Ireland	John McAdorey, Gary Ryan, Tom Comyns, Paul Brizzell	4	0.226 s	39.26 s		NR
5	22	Mauritius	Jonathan Chimier, Eric Milazar, Stéphan Buckland, Fernando Augustin	8	0.419 s	39.55 s		
6	26	Israel	Kfir Golan, Gidon Yablonka, Tommy Kafri, Aleksandr Porkhomovskiy	7	0.237 s	39.76 s		
7	30	Saudi Arabia	Mohamed Al-Yami, Mubarak Ata Mubarak, Salem Mubarak Al-Yami, Jamal Al-Saffar	7	0.193 s	39.94 s		
		Ghana	Christian Nsiah, Kenneth Andam, Aziz Zakari, Leonard Myles-Mills	1	0.250 s	DNF		

Heat 4 of 5 Date: Friday 29 September 2000
Place		Nation	Athletes	Lane	Reaction	Time	Qual.	Record
Heat	Overall	Nation	Athletes	Lane	Reaction	Time	Qual.	Record
1	4T	Cuba	José Ángel César, Luis Alberto Pérez-Rionda, Iván García, Freddy Mayola	8	0.414 s	38.74 s	Q	
2	6	Australia	Matt Shirvington, Paul Di Bella, Darryl Wohlsen, Patrick Johnson	2	0.167 s	38.76 s	Q	
3	12	Trinidad and Tobago	Niconnor Alexander, Julieon Raeburn, Jacey Harper, Marc Burns	7	0.176 s	39.12 s	q	SB
4	21	Hungary	Viktor Kovács, Géza Pauer, László Babály, Miklós Gyulai	6	0.474 s	39.52 s		
5	24	Cameroon	Alfred Moussambani, Serge Bengono, Joseph Batangdon, Benjamin Sirimou	5	0.165 s	39.62 s		
6	28	Oman	Mohamed Said Al-Maskary, Hamoud Abdallah Al-Dalhami, Mohamed Al-Houti, Jahad Abdullah Al-Sheikh	1	0.125 s	39.82 s		SB
7	32	Puerto Rico	Osvaldo Nieves, Rogelio Pizarro, Jorge Richardson, Félix Omar Fernández	3	0.233 s	40.12 s		
8	38	Uzbekistan	Oleg Juravlyov, Konstantin Zhuravlyov, Anvar Kuchmuradov, Nikolay Yeroshenko	4	0.423 s	41.20 s		

Heat 5 of 5 Date: Friday 29 September 2000
Place		Nation	Athletes	Lane	Reaction	Time	Qual.	Record
Heat	Overall	Nation	Athletes	Lane	Reaction	Time	Qual.	Record
1	1	United States	Kenneth Brokenburr, Tim Montgomery, Brian Lewis, Maurice Greene	6	0.216 s	38.15 s	Q	
2	3	Japan	Shingo Kawabata, Koji Ito, Shingo Suetsugu, Nobuharu Asahara	3	0.222 s	38.52 s	Q	SB
3	4T	Poland	Marcin Nowak, Marcin Urbaś, Piotr Balcerzak, Ryszard Pilarczyk	7	0.215 s	38.74 s	q	SB
4	18	Russia	Dmitri Vasilyev, Aleksandr Ryabov, Aleksandr Smirnov, Sergey Bychkov	4	0.152 s	39.29 s		SB
5	20	Venezuela	Juan Morillo, José Peña, José Carabalí, Hely Ollarves	2	0.214 s	39.45 s		NR
6	29	Croatia	Slaven Krajacic, Dejan Vojnovic, Siniša Ergotic, Tihomir Buinjac	5	0.129 s	39.87 s		
7	36	Indonesia	Sukari, Erwin Heru Susanto, Yanes Raubaba, John Muray	1	0.232 s	40.35 s		
8	37	Barbados	Wilan Louis, Victor Houston, Gabriel Burnett, Fabian Rollins	8	40.38 s			

Round 1- Overall

Round 1 Overall Results
Place	Nation	Athletes	Heat	Lane	Place	Time	Qual.	Record
1	United States	Kenneth Brokenburr, Tim Montgomery, Brian Lewis, Maurice Greene	5	6	1	38.15 s	Q	
2	Brazil	Vicente de Lima, Édson Ribeiro, André da Silva, Cláudio Roberto Souza	2	8	1	38.32 s	Q	
3	Japan	Shingo Kawabata, Koji Ito, Shingo Suetsugu, Nobuharu Asahara	5	3	2	38.52 s	Q	SB
4	Cuba	José Ángel César, Luis Alberto Pérez-Rionda, Iván García, Freddy Mayola	4	8	1	38.74 s	Q	
4	Poland	Marcin Nowak, Marcin Urbaś, Piotr Balcerzak, Ryszard Pilarczyk	5	7	3	38.74 s	q	SB
6	Australia	Matt Shirvington, Paul Di Bella, Darryl Wohlsen, Patrick Johnson	4	2	2	38.76 s	Q	
7	Italy	Francesco Scuderi, Alessandro Cavallaro, Maurizio Checcucci, Andrea Colombo	2	5	2	38.84 s	Q	SB
8	Nigeria	Uchenna Emedolu, Nnamdi Anusim, Sunday Emmanuel, Deji Aliu	2	4	3	38.97 s	q	SB
9	Jamaica	Donovan Powell, Dwight Thomas, Lindel Frater, Llewellyn Bredwood	2	3	4	38.97 s	q	
10	France	Frédéric Krantz, David Patros, Christophe Cheval, Jérôme Eyana	3	5	1	39.00 s	Q	
11	Ivory Coast	Eric Pacôme N'Dri, Ahmed Douhou, Yves Sonan, Ibrahim Meité	1	7	1	39.06 s	Q	
12	Trinidad and Tobago	Niconnor Alexander, Julieon Raeburn, Jacey Harper, Marc Burns	4	7	3	39.12 s	q	SB
13	Thailand	Kongdech Natenee, Vissanu Sophanich, Boonyarit Phuksachat, Sittichai Suwonprateep	1	3	2	39.13 s	Q	
14	Greece	Georgios Theodoridis, Konstadinos Kederis, Alexios Alexopoulos, Aggelos Pavlakakis	3	2	2	39.21 s	Q	
15	Slovenia	Matic Šušteršic, Matic Osovnikar, Bostjan Fridrih, Urban Acman	2	6	5	39.25 s	q	NR
16	Canada	Bradley McCuaig, Glenroy Gilbert, Pierre Browne, Nicolas Macrozonaris	3	6	3	39.26 s	q	SB
16	Ireland	John McAdorey, Gary Ryan, Tom Comyns, Paul Brizzell	3	4	4	39.26 s		NR
18	Russia	Dmitri Vasilyev, Aleksandr Ryabov, Aleksandr Smirnov, Sergey Bychkov	5	4	4	39.29 s		SB
19	Guatemala	Rolando Blanco, Oscar Meneses, José Meneses, Jose Tinoco	1	6	3	39.34 s		NR
20	Venezuela	Juan Morillo, José Peña, José Carabalí, Hely Ollarves	5	2	5	39.45 s		NR
21	Hungary	Viktor Kovács, Géza Pauer, László Babály, Miklós Gyulai	4	6	4	39.52 s		
22	Mauritius	Jonathan Chimier, Eric Milazar, Stéphan Buckland, Fernando Augustin	3	8	5	39.55 s		
23	Bahamas	Renward Wells, Dominic Demeritte, Iram Lewis, Wellington Saunders Whymms	1	2	4	39.57 s		
24	Cameroon	Alfred Moussambani, Serge Bengono, Joseph Batangdon, Benjamin Sirimou	4	5	5	39.62 s		
25	Cyprus	Anthimos Rotos, Anninos Marcoullides, Prodromos Katsantonis, Yiannakis Zisimides	1	4	5	39.75 s		
26	Israel	Kfir Golan, Gidon Yablonka, Tommy Kafri, Aleksandr Porkhomovskiy	3	3	6	39.76 s		
27	Liberia	Kouty Mawenh, Sayon Cooper, Andrew Reyes, Koiyan Morlu	2	7	6	39.77 s		NR
28	Oman	Mohammed Said Al Maskari, Hamoud Al-Dalhami, Mohamed Said Al-Maskary, Jihad Al Sheikh	4	1	6	39.82 s		SB
29	Croatia	Slaven Krajacic, Dejan Vojnovic, Siniša Ergotic, Tihomir Buinjac	5	5	6	39.87 s		
30	Saudi Arabia	Mohammed M M Alyami, Mubarak Ata Mubarak, Salem Mubarak Al-Yami, Jamal Al-Saffar	3	7	7	39.94 s		
31	FR Yugoslavia	Slobodan Spasić, Predrag Momirović, Milos Sakić, Milan Petaković	1	8	6	39.99 s		
32	Puerto Rico	Osvaldo Nieves, Rogelio Pizarro, Jorge Richardson, Félix Omar Fernández	4	3	7	40.12 s		
33	Hong Kong	Wai Lok To, Kwan Lung Ho, Hon Sing Tang, Wai Hung Chiang	2	2	7	40.15 s		
34	Chile	Diego Valdés, Ricardo Roach, Rodrigo Roach, Juan Pablo Faúndez	2	1	8	40.20 s		
35	India	Thirugnan Durai, Rajeev Balakrishnan, Ajay Raj Singh, Anil Kumar Prakash	1	5	7	40.23 s		
36	Indonesia	Sukari, Erwin Heru Susanto, Janis Roubaba, John Muray	5	1	7	40.35 s		
37	Barbados	Wilan Louis, Victor Houston, Gabriel Burnett, Fabian Rollins	5	8	8	40.38 s		
38	Uzbekistan	Oleg Juravlyov, Konstantin Zhuravlyov, Anvar Kuchmuradov, Nikolay Eroshenko	4	4	8	41.20 s		
	Great Britain	Allyn Condon, Jason Gardener, Marlon Devonish, Dwain Chambers	1	1		DQ		
	Ghana	Christian Nsiah, Kenneth Andam, Aziz Zakari, Leonard Myles-Mills	3	1		DNF		

=== Semi-finals ===
Heat 1 of 2 Date: Friday 29 September 2000
Place		Nation	Athletes	Lane	Reaction	Time	Qual.	Record
Heat	Overall	Nation	Athletes	Lane	Reaction	Time	Qual.	Record
1	1	United States	Jon Drummond, Bernard Williams, Brian Lewis, Maurice Greene	6	0.142 s	37.82 s	Q	
2	3T	Jamaica	Lindel Frater, Dwight Thomas, Christopher Williams, Llewellyn Bredwood	1	0.154 s	38.27 s	Q	NR
3	7	France	Frédéric Krantz, David Patros, Christophe Cheval, Needy Guims	5	0.158 s	38.64 s	Q	
4	8	Italy	Francesco Scuderi, Alessandro Cavallaro, Maurizio Checcucci, Andrea Colombo	3	0.146 s	38.67 s	q	SB
5	10	Ivory Coast	Eric Pacôme N'Dri, Ahmed Douhou, Yves Sonan, Ibrahim Meité	4	0.435 s	38.82 s		SB
6	11T	Canada	Bradley McCuaig, Glenroy Gilbert, Pierre Browne, Adrian Woodley	2	0.172 s	38.92 s		SB
7	13	Thailand	Kongdech Natenee, Vissanu Sophanich, Boonyarit Phuksachat, Sittichai Suwonprateep	7	0.150 s	39.05 s		
8		Nigeria	Uchenna Emedolu, Nnamdi Anusim, Sunday Emmanuel, Deji Aliu	8	0.194 s	DNF		

Heat 2 of 2 Date: Friday 29 September 2000
Place		Nation	Athletes	Lane	Reaction	Time	Qual.	Record
Heat	Overall	Nation	Athletes	Lane	Reaction	Time	Qual.	Record
1	2	Cuba	José Ángel César, Luis Alberto Pérez-Rionda, Iván García, Freddy Mayola	5	0.481 s	38.16 s	Q	
2	3T	Brazil	Vicente de Lima, Édson Ribeiro, André da Silva, Claudinei da Silva	4	0.394 s	38.27 s	Q	
3	5	Japan	Shingo Kawabata, Koji Ito, Shingo Suetsugu, Nobuharu Asahara	6	0.481 s	38.31 s	Q	=AR
4	6	Poland	Marcin Nowak, Marcin Urbaś, Piotr Balcerzak, Ryszard Pilarczyk	7	0.224 s	38.60 s	q	SB
5	9	Greece	Georgios Theodoridis, Konstadinos Kederis, Alexios Alexopoulos, Aggelos Pavlakakis	2	0.211 s	38.80 s		
6	11T	Trinidad and Tobago	Niconnor Alexander, Julieon Raeburn, Marc Burns, Ato Boldon	8	0.210 s	38.92 s		NR
		Australia	Matt Shirvington, Paul Di Bella, Darryl Wohlsen, Patrick Johnson	3	0.215 s	DQ		
		Slovenia	Matic Šušteršic, Matic Osovnikar, Bostjan Fridrih, Urban Acman	1	0.165 s	DQ		

Semi-Finals overall

Semi-finals Overall Results
Place	Nation	Athletes	Heat	Lane	Place	Time	Qual.	Record
1	United States	Jon Drummond, Bernard Williams, Brian Lewis, Maurice Greene	1	6	1	37.82 s	Q	
2	Cuba	José Ángel César, Luis Alberto Pérez-Rionda, Iván García, Freddy Mayola	2	5	1	38.16 s	Q	
3	Brazil	Vicente de Lima, Édson Ribeiro, André da Silva, Claudinei da Silva	2	4	2	38.27 s	Q	
3	Jamaica	Lindel Frater, Dwight Thomas, Christopher Williams, Llewellyn Bredwood	1	1	2	38.27 s	Q	NR
5	Japan	Shingo Kawabata, Koji Ito, Shingo Suetsugu, Nobuharu Asahara	2	6	3	38.31 s	Q	=AR
6	Poland	Marcin Nowak, Marcin Urbaś, Piotr Balcerzak, Ryszard Pilarczyk	2	7	4	38.60 s	q	SB
7	France	Frédéric Krantz, David Patros, Christophe Cheval, Needy Guims	1	5	3	38.64 s	Q	
8	Italy	Francesco Scuderi, Alessandro Cavallaro, Maurizio Checcucci, Andrea Colombo	1	3	4	38.67 s	q	SB
9	Greece	Georgios Theodoridis, Konstadinos Kederis, Alexios Alexopoulos, Aggelos Pavlakakis	2	2	5	38.80 s		
10	Ivory Coast	Eric Pacôme N'Dri, Ahmed Douhou, Yves Sonan, Ibrahim Meité	1	4	5	38.82 s		SB
11	Canada	Bradley McCuaig, Glenroy Gilbert, Pierre Browne, Adrian Woodley	1	2	6	38.92 s		SB
11	Trinidad and Tobago	Niconnor Alexander, Julieon Raeburn, Marc Burns, Ato Boldon	2	8	6	38.92 s		NR
13	Thailand	Kongdech Natenee, Vissanu Sophanich, Boonyarit Phuksachat, Sittichai Suwonprateep	1	7	7	39.05 s		
	Australia	Matt Shirvington, Paul Di Bella, Darryl Wohlsen, Patrick Johnson	2	3		DQ		
	Slovenia	Matic Šušteršic, Matic Osovnikar, Bostjan Fridrih, Urban Acman	2	1		DQ		
	Nigeria	Uchenna Emedolu, Nnamdi Anusim, Sunday Emmanuel, Deji Aliu	1	8		DNF		

=== Final ===
Final
Place	Nation	Athletes	Lane	Reaction	Time	Record
1	United States	Jon Drummond, Bernard Williams, Brian Lewis, Maurice Greene	5	0.126 s	37.61 s	SB
2	Brazil	Vicente de Lima, Édson Ribeiro, André da Silva, Claudinei da Silva	4	0.188 s	37.90 s	NR
3	Cuba	José Ángel César, Luis Alberto Pérez-Rionda, Iván García, Freddy Mayola	3	0.238 s	38.04 s	SB
4	Jamaica	Lindel Frater, Dwight Thomas, Christopher Williams, Llewellyn Bredwood	6	0.315 s	38.20 s	NR
5	France	Frédéric Krantz, David Patros, Christophe Cheval, Needy Guims	7	0.153s	38.49 s	SB
6	Japan	Shigeyuki Kojima, Koji Ito, Shingo Suetsugu, Nobuharu Asahara	2	0.221 s	38.66 s	
7	Italy	Francesco Scuderi, Alessandro Cavallaro, Maurizio Checcucci, Andrea Colombo	8	0.146s	38.67 s	
8	Poland	Marcin Nowak, Marcin Urbaś, Piotr Balcerzak, Ryszard Pilarczyk	1	0.196 s	38.96 s	
