= 2001 IAAF World Indoor Championships – Men's 60 metres =

The men's 60 metres event at the 2001 IAAF World Indoor Championships was held on March 11.

== Medalists ==
Gold	Silver	Bronze
Tim Harden; United States	Tim Montgomery; United States	Mark Lewis-Francis; Great Britain

== Results ==
=== Heats ===
First 2 of each heat (Q) and next 8 fastest (q) qualified for the semifinals.

Rank	Heat	Name	Nationality	Time	Notes
1	2	Angelos Pavlakakis	Greece	6.59	Q
2	3	Tim Montgomery	United States	6.60	Q
3	8	Mark Lewis-Francis	Great Britain	6.61	Q, PB
4	6	Deji Aliu	Nigeria	6.62	Q
4	8	Matthew Shirvington	Australia	6.62	Q
6	3	Freddy Mayola	Cuba	6.63	Q
7	1	Georgios Theodoridis	Greece	6.65	Q
7	5	Venancio José	Spain	6.65	Q
7	5	Jérôme Éyana	France	6.65	Q, PB
10	6	Stéphane Cali	France	6.66	Q
11	6	Nobuharu Asahara	Japan	6.66	q
12	4	Tim Harden	United States	6.67	Q
13	8	Tim Göbel	Germany	6.69	q
14	4	Nicolas Macrozonaris	Canada	6.70	Q
14	4	Erik Wijmeersch	Belgium	6.70	q, PB
14	6	Gennadiy Chernovol	Kazakhstan	6.70	q
17	2	Marcin Krzywański	Poland	6.71	Q
17	5	Luca Verdecchia	Italy	6.71	q
19	7	Patrick Johnson	Australia	6.72	Q
20	7	Urban Acman	Slovenia	6.73	Q
21	7	Nathan Bongelo	Belgium	6.74	q
22	7	Sergey Bychkov	Russia	6.74	q
23	3	Peter Frederick	Trinidad and Tobago	6.75	q
24	2	Christian Malcolm	Great Britain	6.77	
24	3	Ibrahim Meité	Ivory Coast	6.77	
24	4	Matic Šušteršic	Slovenia	6.77	
27	3	Dmitri Vasilyev	Russia	6.78	
28	4	Chiang Wai Hung	Hong Kong	6.81	
29	1	Shingo Kawabata	Japan	6.82	Q
29	2	Rolando Blanco	Guatemala	6.82	PB
29	5	Carlos Santos	Puerto Rico	6.82	
32	1	Konstantin Rurak	Ukraine	6.83	
33	2	Slaven Krajačić	Croatia	6.86	
34	6	Rashid Chouhal	Malta	6.87	SB
35	1	Peter Pulu	Papua New Guinea	6.89	
35	6	Ahmad Nasr Ahmad	Egypt	6.89	
37	3	Sayon Cooper	Liberia	6.91	
38	7	Watson Nyambek	Malaysia	6.94	
39	2	Erol Mutlusoy	Turkey	6.95	
39	5	Idrissa Sanou	Burkina Faso	6.95	
41	4	Eric Nkansah	Ghana	6.97	
42	1	Vahagn Javachyan	Armenia	6.99	
43	5	Gian Nicola Berardi	San Marino	7.00	
43	7	Patrick Mocci Raoumbé	Gabon	7.00	
43	7	Arben Maka	Albania	7.00	
46	1	Diego Ferreira	Paraguay	7.04	
47	8	Joseph Colville	Costa Rica	7.05	
48	6	Reuben Apuri	Solomon Islands	7.09	
48	8	Ram Krishna Chaudhari	Nepal	7.09	
50	2	Youssef El Haress	Lebanon	7.10	NR
51	8	Francesco Scuderi	Italy	7.13	
52	1	Sunday Emmanuel	Nigeria	7.18	
53	7	Watson dos Anjos	São Tomé and Príncipe	7.23	
54	4	Somephavanh Soukalune	Laos	7.29	NR
55	1	Timothy Brooks	Anguilla	7.34	
56	5	Dylan Menzies	Norfolk Island	7.38	
57	2	Jean-Marie Vianney Mouanda	Republic of the Congo	7.43	
58	8	Fagamanu Sofai	Samoa	7.67	
	3	Moussa Camara	Guinea	DNS	
	5	Leonard Myles-Mills	Ghana	DNS	
	6	Denis Daniel Gutierrez	Nicaragua	DNS	
	8	Sherwin James	Dominica	DNS	

=== Semifinals ===
First 2 of each semifinal (Q) and next 2 fastest (q) qualified for the final.

Rank	Heat	Name	Nationality	Time	Notes
1	3	Tim Harden	United States	6.52	Q, SB
2	1	Deji Aliu	Nigeria	6.55	Q, SB
3	1	Mark Lewis-Francis	Great Britain	6.56	Q, PB
4	2	Tim Montgomery	United States	6.57	Q
5	1	Matthew Shirvington	Australia	6.59	q
5	3	Tim Göbel	Germany	6.59	Q
7	1	Freddy Mayola	Cuba	6.60	q, SB
8	2	Georgios Theodoridis	Greece	6.60	Q
9	3	Venancio José	Spain	6.61	
10	3	Angelos Pavlakakis	Greece	6.63	
11	2	Jérôme Éyana	France	6.64	PB
12	3	Nicolas Macrozonaris	Canada	6.67	
13	3	Stéphane Cali	France	6.68	
14	2	Gennadiy Chernovol	Kazakhstan	6.69	
15	2	Patrick Johnson	Australia	6.69	
16	1	Urban Acman	Slovenia	6.70	
17	2	Nobuharu Asahara	Japan	6.72	
17	3	Peter Frederick	Trinidad and Tobago	6.72	
19	2	Marcin Krzywański	Poland	6.73	
20	1	Luca Verdecchia	Italy	6.74	
21	3	Erik Wijmeersch	Belgium	6.78	
22	1	Nathan Bongelo	Belgium	6.84	
23	1	Shingo Kawabata	Japan	6.85	
24	2	Sergey Bychkov	Russia	6.89	

=== Final ===
Rank	Name	Nationality	Time	Notes
1st place, gold medalist(s)	Tim Harden	United States	6.44	SB
2nd place, silver medalist(s)	Tim Montgomery	United States	6.46	PB
3rd place, bronze medalist(s)	Mark Lewis-Francis	Great Britain	6.51	WJR
4	Freddy Mayola	Cuba	6.55	SB
5	Matthew Shirvington	Australia	6.55	SB
6	Tim Göbel	Germany	6.59	
7	Georgios Theodoridis	Greece	6.60	
	Deji Aliu	Nigeria	DQ	
