= Athletics at the 1998 Commonwealth Games – Men's 100 metres =

Men's 100 metres at the 1998 Commonwealth Games
- Venue: National Stadium, Bukit Jalil
- Dates: 16-17 September
- Competitors: 60 from 34 nations
- Winning time: 9.88

Medalists
gold medal	Ato Boldon	Trinidad and Tobago
silver medal	Frankie Fredericks	Namibia
bronze medal	Obadele Thompson	Barbados

The men's 100 metres event at the 1998 Commonwealth Games was held on 16–17 September on National Stadium, Bukit Jalil.

== Results ==
=== Heats ===
Qualification: First 3 of each heat (Q) and the next 8 fastest qualified for the quarterfinals.

Wind:

- Heat 1: -0.1 m/s
- Heat 2: +0.2 m/s
- Heat 3: -0.2 m/s
- Heat 4: 0.0 m/s
- Heat 5: -0.4 m/s
- Heat 6: -0.3 m/s
- Heat 7: -0.3 m/s
- Heat 8: -0.3 m/s

Rank	Heat	Name	Nationality	Time	Notes
1	1	Ato Boldon	Trinidad and Tobago	10.17	Q
2	5	Frankie Fredericks	Namibia	10.19	Q
3	6	Darren Campbell	England	10.23	Q
4	5	Matt Shirvington	Australia	10.24	Q
5	3	Eric Nkansah	Ghana	10.25	Q
6	2	Marlon Devonish	England	10.29	Q
6	3	Chris Donaldson	New Zealand	10.29	Q
6	4	Aziz Zakari	Ghana	10.29	Q
9	7	Obadele Thompson	Barbados	10.30	Q
10	6	Claude Toukene	Cameroon	10.34	Q
11	2	O'Brian Gibbons	Canada	10.35	Q
11	7	Bradley McCuaig	Canada	10.35	Q
13	5	Watson Nyambek	Malaysia	10.36	Q
14	2	Gavin Hunter	Australia	10.40	Q
15	4	Glenroy Gilbert	Canada	10.42	Q
16	4	Dwain Chambers	England	10.44	Q
17	5	Josephus Thomas	Sierra Leone	10.45	q
18	2	Serge Bengono	Cameroon	10.46	q
18	3	James Henthorn	Wales	10.46	Q
20	6	Christian Malcolm	Wales	10.47	Q
21	8	Garth Robinson	Jamaica	10.50	Q
22	2	Kevin Williams	Wales	10.51	q
22	5	Jone Delai	Fiji	10.51	q
24	4	Hamberi Mahat	Malaysia	10.58	q
25	8	Moses Mila Mayat	Uganda	10.59	Q
26	5	Clarkson Reid	Jamaica	10.60	q
26	6	Damien Marsh	Australia	10.60	q
28	8	Sanusi Turay	Sierra Leone	10.62	Q
28	8	Benjamin Sirimou	Cameroon	10.62	Q
30	3	Joseph Styles	Bahamas	10.63	
31	5	Nigel Jones	Grenada	10.68	
32	1	Elliot Bunney	Scotland	10.70	Q
32	1	Barnabé Jolicoeur	Mauritius	10.70	Q
32	8	Hamkah Afik	Singapore	10.70	
35	8	Peter Pulu	Papua New Guinea	10.75	
36	7	Ian Craig	Northern Ireland	10.78	Q
37	8	Raman Ganeshwaran	Malaysia	10.82	
38	6	Leonard Myles-Mills	Ghana	10.84	
39	6	Mohamed Yusuf Alias	Singapore	10.88	
40	7	Alpha B. Kamara	Sierra Leone	10.89	
41	6	Rohan Samuels	Saint Vincent and the Grenadines	10.91	
42	6	Toluta'u Koula	Tonga	10.93	
43	3	Timothy Brooks	Anguilla	11.00	
44	7	Christoffel van Wyk	Namibia	11.03	
45	2	Jackson Ngumbi	Zambia	11.05	
46	4	Benedictus Botha	Namibia	11.07	
47	1	Matarr Njie	Gambia	11.14	
48	8	Adama Faye	Gambia	11.19	
49	2	Leron Francis	Saint Vincent and the Grenadines	11.21	
50	2	Laurence Jack	Vanuatu	11.25	
50	7	Silas Helo	Solomon Islands	11.25	
52	1	Aneri Canon	Nauru	11.27	
53	1	Mohamed Amir	Maldives	11.28	
54	7	Solomone Bole	Fiji	11.33	
55	3	Kevin Furlong	Isle of Man	11.41	
56	4	Cardelle Fenton	Montserrat	11.42	
57	4	Ibrahim Manik	Maldives	11.52	
58	1	David Lightbourne	Turks and Caicos Islands	11.56	
59	5	Julius Bradshaw	Montserrat	11.73	
	3	Allan Akia	Papua New Guinea	DNS	

=== Quarterfinals ===
Qualification: First 4 of each heat qualified directly (Q) for the semifinals.

Wind:

- Heat 1: -0.4 m/s
- Heat 2: 0.0 m/s
- Heat 3: +0.2 m/s
- Heat 4: -0.5 m/s

Rank	Heat	Name	Nationality	Time	Notes
1	4	Ato Boldon	Trinidad and Tobago	10.05	Q, SB
2	3	Obadele Thompson	Barbados	10.09	Q, SB
3	3	Eric Nkansah	Ghana	10.11	Q
3	2	Matt Shirvington	Australia	10.13	Q
3	4	Darren Campbell	England	10.13	Q
6	1	Frankie Fredericks	Namibia	10.15	Q
7	1	Chris Donaldson	New Zealand	10.21	Q
8	2	Marlon Devonish	England	10.22	Q
9	1	Dwain Chambers	England	10.24	Q
10	2	Christian Malcolm	Wales	10.27	Q
10	4	Claude Toukene	Cameroon	10.27	Q
12	1	Aziz Zakari	Ghana	10.29	Q
12	3	Bradley McCuaig	Canada	10.29	Q
12	4	Josephus Thomas	Sierra Leone	10.29	Q
15	1	O'Brian Gibbons	Canada	10.32	
16	1	Serge Bengono	Cameroon	10.38	
16	3	Gavin Hunter	Australia	10.38	Q
18	2	Glenroy Gilbert	Canada	10.42	Q
19	4	Kevin Williams	Wales	10.43	
20	4	Watson Nyambek	Malaysia	10.43	
21	4	Garth Robinson	Jamaica	10.47	
22	2	Clarkson Reid	Jamaica	10.49	
22	3	Hamberi Mahat	Malaysia	10.49	
24	3	Jone Delai	Fiji	10.51	
25	3	James Henthorn	Wales	10.52	
26	3	Moses Mila Mayat	Uganda	10.61	
27	2	Benjamin Sirimou	Cameroon	10.65	
28	2	Ian Craig	Northern Ireland	10.71	
29	2	Elliot Bunney	Scotland	10.72	
30	1	Barnabé Jolicoeur	Mauritius	10.74	
31	1	Sanusi Turay	Sierra Leone	10.75	
	4	Damien Marsh	Australia	DNS	

=== Semifinals ===
Qualification: First 4 of each heat qualified directly (Q) for the final.

Wind:

- Heat 1: 0.0 m/s
- Heat 2: -0.5 m/s

Rank	Heat	Name	Nationality	Time	Notes
1	1	Ato Boldon	Trinidad and Tobago	9.96	Q, SB
2	1	Frankie Fredericks	Namibia	9.98	Q, SB
3	2	Obadele Thompson	Barbados	10.08	Q, SB
4	1	Eric Nkansah	Ghana	10.11	Q
5	2	Matt Shirvington	Australia	10.12	Q, PB
6	1	Marlon Devonish	England	10.13	Q, PB
7	2	Chris Donaldson	New Zealand	10.17	Q, PB
8	1	Dwain Chambers	England	10.18	SB
8	2	Darren Campbell	England	10.18	Q
10	1	Josephus Thomas	Sierra Leone	10.31	
11	2	Christian Malcolm	Wales	10.33	
12	2	Aziz Zakari	Ghana	10.34	
13	1	Bradley McCuaig	Canada	10.37	
14	2	Claude Toukene	Cameroon	10.42	
15	1	Gavin Hunter	Australia	10.49	
16	2	Glenroy Gilbert	Canada	10.51	

=== Final ===
Wind: -0.1 m/s

Rank	Lane	Name	Nationality	Time	Notes
1st place, gold medalist(s)	3	Ato Boldon	Trinidad and Tobago	9.88	GR
2nd place, silver medalist(s)	5	Frankie Fredericks	Namibia	9.96	
3rd place, bronze medalist(s)	4	Obadele Thompson	Barbados	10.00	
4	6	Matt Shirvington	Australia	10.03	AR
5	1	Darren Campbell	England	10.08	
6	2	Eric Nkansah	Ghana	10.18	
7	7	Chris Donaldson	New Zealand	10.19	
8	8	Marlon Devonish	England	10.22	
