= 1999 World Championships in Athletics – Men's 100 metres =

Men's 100 metres at the 1999 World Championships
- Venue: Estadio Olímpico
- Dates: 21 August (heats and quarter-finals); 22 August (semi-finals and final)
- Competitors: 77
- Winning time: 9.80 CR

Medalists
gold medal	Maurice Greene	United States
silver medal	Bruny Surin	Canada
bronze medal	Dwain Chambers	Great Britain

These are the official results of the Men's 100 metres event at the 1999 IAAF World Championships in Seville, Spain. There were a total number of 77 participating athletes, with ten qualifying heats, five quarter-finals, two semi-finals and the final held on Sunday 22 August 1999 at 21:15h.

== Final ==
RANK	FINAL	TIME
	Maurice Greene (USA)	9.80 (CR)
	Bruny Surin (CAN)	9.84
	Dwain Chambers (GBR)	9.97
4.	Obadele Thompson (BAR)	10.00
5.	Tim Harden (USA)	10.02
6.	Tim Montgomery (USA)	10.04
7.	Jason Gardener (GBR)	10.07
8.	Kareem Streete-Thompson (CAY)	10.24

== Semi-final ==
- Held on Sunday 22 August 1999

RANK	HEAT 1	TIME
1.	Maurice Greene (USA)	9.96
2.	Dwain Chambers (GBR)	10.09
3.	Tim Montgomery (USA)	10.14
4.	Kareem Streete-Thompson (CAY)	10.14
5.	Darren Campbell (GBR)	10.15
	Matt Shirvington (AUS)	DQ
	Frank Fredericks (NAM)	DNS
	Freddy Mayola (CUB)	DNS

RANK	HEAT 2	TIME
1.	Bruny Surin (CAN)	9.96
2.	Tim Harden (USA)	10.05
3.	Obadele Thompson (BAR)	10.07
4.	Jason Gardener (GBR)	10.10
5.	Brian Lewis (USA)	10.13
6.	Leonard Myles-Mills (GHA)	10.16
7.	Davidson Ezinwa (NGR)	10.40
8.	Gábor Dobos (HUN)	10.47

== Quarter-finals ==
- Held on Saturday 21 August 1999

RANK	HEAT 1	TIME
1.	Jason Gardener (GBR)	10.04
2.	Brian Lewis (USA)	10.18
3.	Davidson Ezinwa (NGR)	10.23
4.	Matthew Quinn (RSA)	10.24
5.	Stefano Tilli (ITA)	10.26
6.	Vitaly Medvedev (KAZ)	10.26
7.	Georgios Theodoridis (GRE)	10.30
8.	Bradley McCuaig (CAN)	10.61

RANK	HEAT 2	TIME
1.	Obadele Thompson (BAR)	10.04
2.	Leonard Myles-Mills (GHA)	10.10
3.	Matt Shirvington (AUS)	10.16
4.	Roland Németh (HUN)	10.16
5.	Christoforos Choidis (GRE)	10.21
6.	Nathanaël Esprit (AHO)	10.26
7.	Vicente de Lima (BRA)	10.36
8.	Tommy Kafri (ISR)	10.36

RANK	HEAT 3	TIME
1.	Dwain Chambers (GBR)	10.08
2.	Tim Harden (USA)	10.12
3.	Kareem Streete-Thompson (CAY)	10.14 (NR)
4.	Innocent Asonze (NGR)	10.18
5.	Aleksandr Porkhomovskiy (ISR)	10.20 (NR)
6.	Patrick Stevens (BEL)	10.23
7.	Piotr Balcerzak (POL)	10.29
8.	Stéphane Buckland (MRI)	10.39

RANK	HEAT 4	TIME
1.	Frank Fredericks (NAM)	10.09
2.	Tim Montgomery (USA)	10.12
3.	Darren Campbell (GBR)	10.12
4.	Freddy Mayola (CUB)	10.15
5.	Patrick Jarrett (JAM)	10.22
6.	Eric Nkansah (GHA)	10.26
7.	Ibrahim Meité (CIV)	10.34
8.	André da Silva (BRA)	10.37

RANK	HEAT 5	TIME
1.	Maurice Greene (USA)	9.91
2.	Bruny Surin (CAN)	9.95
3.	Gábor Dobos (HUN)	10.22
4.	Deji Aliu (NGR)	10.22
5.	Carlos Calado (POR)	10.24
6.	Marcin Nowak (POL)	10.29
7.	Koji Ito (JPN)	10.40
8.	Claude Toukene (CMR)	10.48

== Heats ==
- Held on Saturday 21 August 1999

RANK	HEAT 1	TIME
1.	Maurice Greene (USA)	10.30
2.	Patrick Stevens (BEL)	10.38
3.	Vitaly Medvedev (KAZ)	10.39
4.	Bradley McCuaig (CAN)	10.42
5.	Bradley Agnew (RSA)	10.51
6.	Pascual Charo Esono (GEQ)	11.32
7.	Philam Garcia (GUM)	12.82

RANK	HEAT 2	TIME
1.	Jason Gardener (GBR)	10.27
2.	Roland Németh (HUN)	10.28
3.	Christoforos Choidis (GRE)	10.30
4.	Martin Lachkovics (AUT)	10.47
5.	Erik Wijmeersch (BEL)	10.56
6.	Joel Mascoll (VIN)	10.63
7.	Alpha Kamara (SLE)	10.80
8.	Matarr Njie (GAM)	11.09

RANK	HEAT 3	TIME
1.	Frank Fredericks (NAM)	10.22
2.	Piotr Balcerzak (POL)	10.23
3.	Freddy Mayola (CUB)	10.25
4.	Stefano Tilli (ITA)	10.35
5.	Édson Luciano Ribeiro (BRA)	10.47
6.	Toluta'u Koula (TON)	11.11
7.	Dinh Minh Nguyen (VIE)	11.20
	Sebergue Moumi (CHA)	DNS

RANK	HEAT 4	TIME
1.	Tim Montgomery (USA)	10.27
2.	Georgios Theodoridis (GRE)	10.32
3.	André da Silva (BRA)	10.41
4.	Claude Toukene (CMR)	10.44
5.	Gabriel Simón (ARG)	10.49
6.	Watson Nyambek (MAS)	10.54
7.	Roman Cress (MHL)	10.70
	Ousmane Diarra (MLI)	DQ

RANK	HEAT 5	TIME
1.	Bruny Surin (CAN)	10.18
2.	Darren Campbell (GBR)	10.37
3.	Innocent Asonze (NGR)	10.47
4.	Chris Donaldson (NZL)	10.47
5.	Tetsuya Nakamura (JPN)	10.57
6.	Timothy Brooks (AIA)	11.08
7.	Patrickson Anson (FSM)	11.68

RANK	HEAT 6	TIME
1.	Dwain Chambers (GBR)	10.34
2.	Koji Ito (JPN)	10.38
3.	Aleksandr Porkhomovskiy (ISR)	10.42
4.	Kim Collins (SKN)	10.50
5.	Urban Acman (SLO)	10.56
6.	Pedro Pablo Nolet (ESP)	10.70
7.	Muhammad Abdel Baqi (JOR)	11.42
	Joebert Delicano (PHI)	DNS

RANK	HEAT 7	TIME
1.	Davidson Ezinwa (NGR)	10.22
2.	Brian Lewis (USA)	10.23
3.	Kareem Streete-Thompson (CAY)	10.24
4.	Tommy Kafri (ISR)	10.38
5.	Eric Nkansah (GHA)	10.42
6.	Sayon Cooper (LBR)	10.56
7.	Brahim Mohamed Ould (MTN)	11.17
8.	Imad Ahmed (IRQ)	11.26

RANK	HEAT 8	TIME
1.	Tim Harden (USA)	10.18
2.	Carlos Calado (POR)	10.20
3.	Deji Aliu (NGR)	10.22
4.	Marcin Nowak (POL)	10.23
5.	Carlos Gats (ARG)	10.55
6.	Chintake de Soysa (SRI)	10.70
7.	Robertson Temaki (NRU)	12.14

RANK	HEAT 9	TIME
1.	Matt Shirvington (AUS)	10.24
2.	Nathanaël Esprit (AHO)	10.28
3.	Leonard Myles-Mills (GHA)	10.29
4.	Patrick Jarrett (JAM)	10.34
5.	Pascal Dangbo (BEN)	10.64
6.	Amarildo Almeida (GBS)	10.80
7.	Misili Manu (SAM)	10.91
	Abjulla Kafi (BAN)	DNS

RANK	HEAT 10	TIME
1.	Obadele Thompson (BAR)	10.26
2.	Ibrahim Meité (CIV)	10.28
3.	Matthew Quinn (RSA)	10.28
4.	Gábor Dobos (HUN)	10.30
5.	Vicente de Lima (BRA)	10.38
6.	Stéphane Buckland (MRI)	10.43
7.	Reanchai Seeharwong (THA)	10.45
	Levard Missick (TCA)	DNS
