= Athletics at the 1998 Commonwealth Games – Men's 4 × 100 metres relay =

Men's 4 × 100 metres relay at the Commonwealth Games

The men's 4 × 100 metres relay event at the 1998 Commonwealth Games was held 20–21 September on National Stadium, Bukit Jalil.

== Medalists ==
Gold	Silver	Bronze
England; Dwain Chambers; Marlon Devonish; Julian Golding; Darren Campbell; Jason Gardener*	Canada; Bradley McCuaig; Glenroy Gilbert; O'Brian Gibbons; Trevino Betty	Australia; Gavin Hunter; Darryl Wohlsen; Stephen Brimacombe; Matt Shirvington; Rodney Zuyderwyk*

* Athletes who competed in heats only and received medals.

== Results ==
=== Heats ===
Qualification: First 3 teams of each heat (Q) plus the next 2 fastest (q) qualified for the final.

Rank	Heat	Nation	Athletes	Time	Notes
1	2	Canada	Bradley McCuaig, Glenroy Gilbert, O'Brian Gibbons, Trevino Betty	38.62	Q
2	2	England	Jason Gardener, Marlon Devonish, Dwain Chambers, Darren Campbell	38.62	Q
3	2	Wales	Kevin Williams, Douglas Turner, Christian Malcolm, James Henthorn	39.09	Q, NR
4	2	Ghana	Tanko Braimah, Aziz Zakari, Mark Anthony Awere, Eric Nkansah	39.28	q
5	1	Cameroon	Benjamin Sirimou, Serge Bengono, Dalle Delor, Claude Toukene	39.56	Q, SB
6	1	Australia	Gavin Hunter, Darryl Wohlsen, Matt Shirvington, Rodney Zuyderwyk	39.70	Q
7	2	Mauritius	David Victoire, Barnabe Jolicoeur, Stephane Buckland, Eric Milazar	39.71	q
8	1	Sierra Leone	Francis Keita, Josephus Thomas, Joselyn Thomas, Sanusi Turay	39.80	Q
9	1	Barbados	Roger Jordan, Victor Houston, Gabriel Burnett, Obadele Thompson	40.16	
10	1	Malaysia	Tan Kok Lim, Raman Ganeshwaran, Hamberi Mahat, Watson Nyambek	40.31	
11	1	Fiji	Aminiasi Babitu, Jone Delai, Joseph Rodan, Soloveni Nakaunicina	40.34	SB
12	2	Jamaica	Garth Robinson, Wayne Whyte, Greg Hines, Clarkson Reid	40.40	
13	2	Namibia	Benedictus Botha, Christoffel van Wyk, Sherwin Vries, Tobias Akwenye	41.58	
14	1	Gambia	Ousman Jatta, Momodou Colley, Adama Faye, Matarr Njie	41.85	
15	1	Maldives	Ibrahim Manik, Abdulla Ibrahim, Naseer Ismail, Mohammed Amir	43.67	

=== Final ===
Rank	Nation	Athletes	Time	Notes
1st place, gold medalist(s)	England	Dwain Chambers, Marlon Devonish, Julian Golding, Darren Campbell	38.20	GR
2nd place, silver medalist(s)	Canada	Bradley McCuaig, Glenroy Gilbert, O'Brian Gibbons, Trevino Betty	38.46	
3rd place, bronze medalist(s)	Australia	Gavin Hunter, Darryl Wohlsen, Stephen Brimacombe, Matt Shirvington	38.69	
4	Wales	Christian Malcolm, Douglas Turner, James Henthorn, Kevin Williams	38.73	
5	Cameroon	Benjamin Sirimou, Claude Toukene, Dalle Delor, Serge Bengono	39.29	
6	Sierra Leone	Francis Keita, Josephus Thomas, Joselyn Thomas, Sanusi Turay	39.79	
7	Mauritius	Barnabe Jolicoeur, Nicholas Hogan, Stephane Buckland, Eric Milazar	42.70	
	Ghana	Tanko Braimah, Leonard Myles-Mills, Aziz Zakari, Eric Nkansah	DQ	
