= 2001 World Championships in Athletics – Men's 100 metres =

Men's 100 metres at the 2001 World Championships
- Venue: Commonwealth Stadium
- Dates: 4 August (heats and quarter-finals); 5 August (semi-finals and final)
- Competitors: 84
- Winning time: 9.82

Medalists
gold medal	Maurice Greene	United States
silver medal	Bernard Williams	United States
bronze medal	Ato Boldon	Trinidad and Tobago

These are the official results of the Men's 100 metres event at the 2001 IAAF World Championships in Edmonton, Canada. There were a total number of 84 participating athletes, with eleven qualifying heats, five quarter-finals, two semi-finals and the final held on Sunday 5 August 2001 at 17:35h.

== Medalists ==
Gold	Maurice Greene; United States (USA)
Silver	Bernard Williams; United States (USA)
Bronze	Ato Boldon; Trinidad and Tobago (TRI)

== Records ==
Standing records prior to the 2001 World Athletics Championships
World Record	Maurice Greene (USA)	9.79	June 16, 1999	Athens, Greece
Event Record	Maurice Greene (USA)	9.80	August 22, 1999	Seville, Spain
Season Best	Ato Boldon (TTO)	9.88	July 13, 2001	Oslo, Norway

== Final ==
RANK	FINAL	TIME
	Maurice Greene (USA)	9.82
	Bernard Williams (USA)	9.94
	Ato Boldon (TRI)	9.98
4.	Dwain Chambers (GBR)	9.99
5.	Kim Collins (SKN)	10.07
6.	Christian Malcolm (GBR)	10.11
7.	Abdul Aziz Zakari (GHA)	10.24
—	Tim Montgomery (USA)	~~9.85~~ (DQ)

== Semi-final ==
- Held on Sunday 5 August 2001

RANK	HEAT 1	TIME
1.	Maurice Greene (USA)	10.01
2.	Ato Boldon (TRI)	10.12
3.	Kim Collins (SKN)	10.12
4.	Abdul Aziz Zakari (GHA)	10.17
5.	Mark Lewis-Francis (GBR)	10.26
6.	Donovan Bailey (CAN)	10.33
7.	Nobuharu Asahara (JPN)	10.33
8.	Troy Douglas (NED)	10.47

RANK	HEAT 2	TIME
1.	Bernard Williams (USA)	10.06
2.	Dwain Chambers (GBR)	10.10
3.	Christian Malcolm (GBR)	10.24
4.	Uchenna Emedolu (NGR)	10.29
5.	Obadele Thompson (BAR)	10.31
6.	Matthew Shirvington (AUS)	10.32
7.	Bruny Surin (CAN)	11.39
—	Tim Montgomery (USA)	~~10.07~~ (DQ)

== Quarter-finals ==
- Held on Saturday 4 August 2001

RANK	HEAT 1	TIME
1.	Kim Collins (SKN)	10.00
2.	Uchenna Emedolu (NGR)	10.06
3.	Troy Douglas (NED)	10.09
4.	Morne Nagel (RSA)	10.20
5.	John Ertzgard (NOR)	10.25
6.	Nicolas Macrozonaris (CAN)	10.28
7.	Aleksandr Porkhomovskiy (ISR)	10.28
	Tim Montgomery (USA)	DQ

RANK	HEAT 2	TIME
1.	Maurice Greene (USA)	9.88
2.	Ato Boldon (TRI)	10.06
3.	Donovan Bailey (CAN)	10.11
4.	Cláudio Roberto Sousa (BRA)	10.26
5.	Serge Bengono (CMR)	10.27
6.	Oumar Loum (SEN)	10.42
7.	Mathew Quinn (RSA)	10.46
—	Llewelyn Bredwood (JAM)	DNS

RANK	HEAT 3	TIME
1.	Mark Lewis-Francis (GBR)	9.97
2.	Obadele Thompson (BAR)	10.03
3.	Bruny Surin (CAN)	10.11
4.	Tommi Hartonen (FIN)	10.21
5.	Salem Mubarak Al-Yami (KSA)	10.21
6.	Fabrice Calligny (FRA)	10.22
7.	Eric Pacome N'Dri (CIV)	10.29
8.	Tim Goebel (GER)	10.31

RANK	HEAT 4	TIME
1.	Dwain Chambers (GBR)	9.97
2.	Nobuharu Asahara (JPN)	10.06
3.	Abdul Aziz Zakari (GHA)	10.11
4.	Aham Okeke (NOR)	10.15
5.	Jamal Abdullah Al-Saffar (KSA)	10.17
6.	Piotr Balcerzak (POL)	10.33
7.	David Patros (FRA)	10.34
—	Antoine Boussombo (GAB)	DNS

RANK	HEAT 5	TIME
1.	Bernard Williams (USA)	9.95
2.	Christian Malcolm (GBR)	10.09
3.	Matthew Shirvington (AUS)	10.14
4.	Kenneth Andam (GHA)	10.26
5.	Gennadiy Chernovol (KAZ)	10.28
6.	Chinedu Oriala (NGR)	10.30
7.	Jaycey Harper (TRI)	10.45
8.	Ibrahim Meité (CIV)	10.48

== Heats ==
- Held on Saturday 4 August 2001

RANK	HEAT 1	TIME
1.	Kim Collins (SKN)	10.30
2.	Fabrice Calligny (FRA)	10.32
3.	Kenneth Andam (GHA)	10.40
4.	Morne Nagel (RSA)	10.49
5.	Wai Hung Chiang (HKG)	10.85
6.	Diego Ferreira (PAR)	10.97
7.	Philam Garcia (GUM)	11.12
8.	Trevor Misipeka (ASA)	14.28

RANK	HEAT 2	TIME
1.	Abdul Aziz Zakari (GHA)	10.26
2.	Troy Douglas (NED)	10.35
3.	Llewelyn Bredwood (JAM)	10.43
4.	Anthony Ferro (BEL)	10.53
5.	Idrissa Sanou (BUR)	10.60
6.	Matarr Njie (GAM)	10.95
7.	Dylan Menzies (NFK)	11.57
—	Mahbub Alam (BAN)	DNS

RANK	HEAT 3	TIME
1.	Matthew Shirvington (AUS)	10.29
2.	Jamal Abdullah Al-Saffar (KSA)	10.31
3.	Chinedu Oriala (NGR)	10.32
4.	Lindel Frater (JAM)	10.57
5.	Sherwin James (DMA)	10.76
6.	Gian Nicola Berardi (SMR)	10.76
7.	Asif Hameed (PAK)	10.84
—	Roman Cress (MHL)	DNS

RANK	HEAT 4	TIME
1.	Bernard Williams (USA)	10.20
2.	Christian Malcolm (GBR)	10.24
3.	Tommi Hartonen (FIN)	10.32
4.	David Patros (FRA)	10.38
5.	Ricardo Alves (POR)	10.55
6.	Vahagn Javakhyan (ARM)	10.92
7.	Rommel Espera (MNP)	12.21

RANK	HEAT 5	TIME
1.	Maurice Greene (USA)	10.33
2.	Serge Bengono (CMR)	10.36
3.	Antoine Boussombo (GAB)	10.38
4.	Reanchai Seehawong (THA)	10.53
5.	Francesco Scuderi (ITA)	10.53
6.	Gibrilla Pato Bangura (SLE)	10.86
7.	Zakaria Messaiké (LIB)	10.96

RANK	HEAT 6	TIME
1.	Nobuharu Asahara (JPN)	10.25
2.	John Ertzgard (NOR)	10.42
3.	Mathew Quinn (RSA)	10.43
4.	Eric Pacome N'Dri (CIV)	10.47
5.	Jaycey Harper (TRI)	10.48
6.	Deodato Freitas (STP)	11.09
7.	Bourgnasit Chanthachack (LAO)	11.59
	Arman Sanip (BRU)	DNS

RANK	HEAT 7	TIME
1.	Bruny Surin (CAN)	10.28
2.	Obadele Thompson (BAR)	10.30
3.	Ibrahim Meité (CIV)	10.45
4.	Sayon Cooper (LBR)	10.62
5.	Rashid Chouhal (MLT)	10.71
6.	Ruslan Rusidze (GEO)	10.83
7.	Sani Biao (TOG)	11.00
—	Freddy Mayola (CUB)	DQ

RANK	HEAT 8	TIME
1.	Mark Lewis-Francis (GBR)	10.21
2.	Gennadiy Chernovol (KAZ)	10.34
3.	Salem Mubarak Al-Yami (KSA)	10.34
4.	Akihiro Yasui (JPN)	10.51
5.	Denis Daniel Gutiérrez (NCA)	10.99
—	Dam Phirum (CAM)	DNS
—	Curtis Johnson (USA)	DNS
—	Justino Sampaio (GBS)	DNS

RANK	HEAT 9	TIME
1.	Uchenna Emedolu (NGR)	10.18
2.	Dwain Chambers (GBR)	10.27
3.	Aham Okeke (NOR)	10.35
4.	Tim Goebel (GER)	10.42
5.	Tsai Meng-Lin (TPE)	10.57
6.	Mohd Roache (SAM)	10.78
7.	John Howard (FSM)	11.05
8.	Sesi Salt (TGA)	11.85

RANK	HEAT 10	TIME
1.	Cláudio Roberto Sousa (BRA)	10.41
2.	Nicolas Macrozonaris (CAN)	10.43
3.	Piotr Balcerzak (POL)	10.45
4.	Hiroyasu Tsuchie (JPN)	10.54
5.	Philemon Roy (VAN)	11.41
6.	David Lightbourne (TCA)	11.53
—	Tim Montgomery (USA)	~~9.92~~ (DQ)

RANK	HEAT 11	TIME
1.	Ato Boldon (TRI)	10.13
2.	Donovan Bailey (CAN)	10.20
3.	Aleksandr Porkhomovskiy (ISR)	10.42
4.	Oumar Loum (SEN)	10.50
5.	Andrew Konai (SOL)	11.10
6.	Harmon Harmon (COK)	11.37
—	Hely Ollarves (VEN)	DNS
