= Athletics at the 1999 Pan American Games – Men's 4 × 100 metres relay =

Men's 4 × 100 metres relay at the Pan American Games

The men's 4 × 100 metres relay event at the 1999 Pan American Games was held July 28–30.

== Medalists ==
| Gold | Silver | Bronze |
|---|---|---|
| Brazil; Raphael de Oliveira; Claudinei da Silva; Édson Ribeiro; André da Silva | Canada; Donovan Bailey; Glenroy Gilbert; Bradley McCuaig; Trevino Betty | Jamaica; Garth Robinson; Patrick Jarrett; Christopher Williams; Dwight Thomas |

== Results ==
=== Heats ===
Qualification: First 3 teams of each heat (Q) plus the next 2 fastest (q) qualified for the final.

| Rank | Heat | Nation | Athletes | Time | Notes |
|---|---|---|---|---|---|
| 1 | 2 | Brazil | Raphael de Oliveira, André da Silva, Claudinei da Silva, Édson Ribeiro | 38.67 | Q |
| 2 | 1 | Canada | Donovan Bailey, Trevino Betty, Bradley McCuaig, Glenroy Gilbert | 38.74 | Q |
| 3 | 2 | United States | Curtis Perry, Kaaron Conwright, Bernard Williams, Dwight Phillips | 38.93 | Q |
| 4 | 1 | Trinidad and Tobago | Niconnor Alexander, Peter Frederick, Jacey Harper, Steve Brown | 38.95 | Q |
| 5 | 2 | Jamaica | Garth Robinson, Dwight Thomas, Christopher Williams, Patrick Jarrett | 39.06 | Q |
| 6 | 1 | Guatemala | Rolando Blanco, José Tinoco, José Meneses, Oscar Meneses | 40.59 | Q |
| 7 | 1 | Netherlands Antilles | Guiseppi Josephia, Nathanaël Esprit, Charlton Rafaela, Caimin Douglas | 40.67 | q |
| 8 | 1 | Saint Lucia | Dominic Johnson, Ronald Promesse, Emile John, Dane Magloire | 40.84 | q |
| 9 | 2 | Haiti | Wladimir Afriani, Wagner Marseille, Jean Rudolph, Yvan Darbouze | 41.55 | |
| | 1 | Cuba | Alfredo García, Freddy Mayola, Luis Alberto Pérez, Misael Ortiz | DNF | |

=== Final ===
| Rank | Lane | Nation | Athletes | Time | Notes |
|---|---|---|---|---|---|
| 1st place, gold medalist(s) | 3 | Brazil | Raphael de Oliveira, Claudinei da Silva, Édson Ribeiro, André da Silva | 38.18 | GR |
| 2nd place, silver medalist(s) | 6 | Canada | Trevino Betty, Donovan Bailey, Glenroy Gilbert, Bradley McCuaig | 38.49 | |
| 3rd place, bronze medalist(s) | 2 | Jamaica | Dwight Thomas, Garth Robinson, Patrick Jarrett, Christopher Williams | 38.82 | |
| 4 | 5 | United States | Curtis Perry, Eugene Swift, Bernard Williams, Kaaron Conwright | 39.00 | |
| 5 | 4 | Trinidad and Tobago | Jacey Harper, Niconnor Alexander, Steve Brown, Peter Frederick | 39.89 | |
| 6 | 8 | Guatemala | José Tinoco, Rolando Blanco, Oscar Meneses, José Meneses | 40.14 | |
| 7 | 7 | Netherlands Antilles | Nathanaël Esprit, Guiseppi Josephia, Caimin Douglas, Charlton Rafaela | 40.20 | |
| 8 | 1 | Saint Lucia | Damian Henville, Ronald Promesse, Dominic Johnson, Emile John | 40.56 | NR |
