= 2003 World Championships in Athletics – Men's 100 metres =

Men's 100 metres at the 2003 World Championships
- Venue: Stade de France
- Dates: 24 August (heats and quarter-finals); 25 August (semi-finals and final)
- Competitors: 84
- Winning time: 10.07

Medalists
gold medal	Kim Collins	Saint Kitts and Nevis
silver medal	Darrel Brown	Trinidad and Tobago
bronze medal	Darren Campbell	Great Britain

These are the official results of the men's 100 metres event at the 2003 IAAF World Championships in Paris, France. There were a total number of 79 participating athletes, with ten qualifying heats, four quarter-finals, two semi-finals and the final held on Monday 25 August 2003.

At 18 years, 318 days old, silver medallist Darrel Brown became the youngest ever world medallist for the men's 100 m.

The winning margin was 0.01 seconds which as of 2024 remains the joint-narrowest winning margin in the men's 100 metres at these championships. The other occurrence was in 2015.

== Final ==
RANK	FINAL	TIME
	Kim Collins (SKN)	10.07
	Darrel Brown (TRI)	10.08
	Darren Campbell (GBR)	10.08
4.	Bernard Williams (USA)	10.13
5.	Deji Aliu (NGR)	10.21
6.	Uchenna Emedolu (NGR)	10.22
—	Dwain Chambers (GBR)	(10.08) DQ
—	Tim Montgomery (USA)	(10.11) DQ

== Semi-final ==
- Held on Monday 2003-08-25

RANK	HEAT 1	TIME
1.	Bernard Williams (USA)	10.11
2.	Uchenna Emedolu (NGR)	10.15
3.	Kim Collins (SKN)	10.16
4.	Nicolas Macrozonaris (CAN)	10.27
5.	Eric Nkansah (GHA)	10.39
6.	Nobuharu Asahara (JPN)	10.42
7.	Mark Lewis-Francis (GBR)	10.44
—	Tim Montgomery (USA)	(10.14) DQ

RANK	HEAT 2	TIME
1.	Darrel Brown (TRI)	10.11
2.	Darren Campbell (GBR)	10.12
3.	Deji Aliu (NGR)	10.14
4.	Dwight Thomas (JAM)	10.19
5.	Ato Boldon (TRI)	10.22
6.	Ronald Pognon (FRA)	10.25
7.	Maurice Greene (USA)	10.37
8.	Sherwin Vries (RSA)	10.41
—	Dwain Chambers (GBR)	(10.06) DQ

== Quarter-finals ==
- Held on Sunday 2003-08-24

RANK	HEAT 1	TIME
1.	Bernard Williams (USA)	10.12
2.	Sherwin Vries (RSA)	10.18
3.	Nobuharu Asahara (JPN)	10.23
4.	Issa-Aimé Nthépé (FRA)	10.25
5.	Leonard Myles-Mills (GHA)	10.25
6.	Matthew Shirvington (AUS)	10.28
7.	Gábor Dobos (HUN)	10.34
—	Tim Montgomery (USA)	DQ

RANK	HEAT 2	TIME
1.	Ato Boldon (TRI)	10.09
2.	Uchenna Emedolu (NGR)	10.13
3.	Nicolas Macrozonaris (CAN)	10.16
4.	Ronald Pognon (FRA)	10.23
4.	Dwight Thomas (JAM)	10.23
6.	Patrick Johnson (AUS)	10.27
—	Jon Drummond (USA)	DQ
—	Asafa Powell (JAM)	DQ

RANK	HEAT 3	TIME
1.	Darrel Brown (TRI)	10.01
2.	Darren Campbell (GBR)	10.14
3.	Eric Nkansah (GHA)	10.15
4.	Mark Lewis-Francis (GBR)	10.18
5.	Georgios Theodoridis (GRE)	10.25
6.	Michael Frater (JAM)	10.25
7.	Matic Osovnikar (SLO)	10.35
8.	Gennadiy Chernovol (KAZ)	10.42

RANK	HEAT 4	TIME
1.	Kim Collins (SKN)	10.02
2.	Maurice Greene (USA)	10.04
3.	Deji Aliu (NGR)	10.04
4.	Obadele Thompson (BAR)	10.14
5.	Édson Luciano Ribeiro (BRA)	10.28
6.	Chen Haijian (CHN)	10.32
7.	Roland Németh (HUN)	10.40
—	Dwain Chambers (GBR)	(10.03) DQ

== Heats ==
Held on Sunday 2003-08-25

RANK	HEAT 1	TIME
1.	Obadele Thompson (BAR)	10.15
2.	Georgios Theodoridis (GRE)	10.17
3.	Mark Lewis-Francis (GBR)	10.17
4.	Jarbas Mascarenhas (BRA)	10.36
5.	Darren Gilford (MLT)	10.60
6.	Abubaker El Tawerghi (LBA)	10.96
7.	Hadhari Djaffar (COM)	11.05
—	Roman Cress (MHL)	DNS

RANK	HEAT 2	TIME
1.	Bernard Williams (USA)	10.19
2.	Sherwin Vries (RSA)	10.20
3.	Gábor Dobos (HUN)	10.22
4.	Nobuharu Asahara (JPN)	10.23
5.	Souhalia Alamou (BEN)	10.46
6.	Khalil Al-Hanahneh (JOR)	10.81
7.	Patrick Mocci Raoumbé (GAB)	11.03
—	Vahagn Javakhyan (ARM)	DQ

RANK	HEAT 3	TIME
1.	Patrick Johnson (AUS)	10.29
2.	Michael Frater (JAM)	10.32
3.	Gennadiy Chernovol (KAZ)	10.33
4.	Alexander Kosenkow (GER)	10.36
5.	Idrissa Sanou (BUR)	10.42
—	Machave Maseko (SWZ)	DQ
—	Mohamad Tamim (LIB)	DQ

RANK	HEAT 4	TIME
1.	Darren Campbell (GBR)	10.18
2.	Nicolas Macrozonaris (CAN)	10.23
3.	Chen Haijian (CHN)	10.31
4.	Kostyantyn Rurak (UKR)	10.46
5.	Markus Pöyhönen (FIN)	10.63
6.	Gian Nicola Berardi (SMR)	10.84
7.	Reginaldo Micha Ndong (GEQ)	11.47
8.	Devi Bahadur Basnet (NEP)	11.47

RANK	HEAT 5	TIME
1.	Darrel Brown (TRI)	10.10
2.	Édson Luciano Ribeiro (BRA)	10.20
3.	Suryo Agung Wibowo (INA)	10.64
4.	Sayon Cooper (LBR)	10.67
5.	JJ Capelle (NRU)	11.49
6.	Kaewanteiti Mwatiera (KIR)	11.86
—	Tim Montgomery (USA)	(10.01) DQ
—	Jamal Abd. Al-Saffar (KSA)	DNS

RANK	HEAT 6	TIME
1.	Jon Drummond (USA)	10.22
2.	Issa-Aimé Nthépé (FRA)	10.30
3.	Matic Osovnikar (SLO)	10.31
4.	Aziz Zakari (GHA)	10.48
5.	Chiang Wai Hung (HKG)	10.70
6.	Arben Makaj (ALB)	10.87
7.	Djikoloum Mobele (CHA)	11.38
8.	Assad Ahmadi (AFG)	11.99

RANK	HEAT 7	TIME
1.	Matthew Shirvington (AUS)	10.30
2.	Roland Németh (HUN)	10.37
3.	Prodromos Katsantonis (CYP)	10.46
4.	Salem Mubarak Al-Yami (KSA)	10.51
5.	Serge Bengono (CMR)	10.56
6.	John Howard (FSM)	11.08
7.	Nay Aung (MYA)	11.37
—	Dwain Chambers (GBR)	(10.33) DQ

RANK	HEAT 8	TIME
1.	Eric Nkansah (GHA)	10.18
2.	Maurice Greene (USA)	10.18
3.	Uchenna Emedolu (NGR)	10.22
4.	Marc Burns (TRI)	10.28
5.	Churandy Martina (AHO)	10.35
6.	Xuan Tran Van (VIE)	10.78
7.	Mohd Yusof Alias (SIN)	11.02
8.	Mohammad Shamsuddin (BAN)	11.18

RANK	HEAT 9	TIME
1.	Asafa Powell (JAM)	10.05
2.	Kim Collins (SKN)	10.09
3.	Leonard Myles-Mills (GHA)	10.25
4.	Anson Henry (CAN)	10.33
5.	Eric Pacome N'Dri (CIV)	10.38
6.	Aaron Egbele (NGR)	10.43
7.	Andre Blackman (GUY)	10.86
8.	Zoran Josifovski (MKD)	11.63

RANK	HEAT 10	TIME
1.	Deji Aliu (NGR)	10.19
2.	Dwight Thomas (JAM)	10.22
3.	Ato Boldon (TRI)	10.23
4.	Ronald Pognon (FRA)	10.26
5.	Roger Angouono-Moke (CGO)	10.50
6.	Sébastien Gattuso (MON)	10.94
7.	Jason Molisingi (VAN)	11.20
8.	Somphavanh Somchanmavong (LAO)	11.43

== See also ==
- Athletics at the 2003 Pan American Games - Men's 100 metres
