= 2000 Asian Athletics Championships – Men's 100 metres =

The men's 100 metres event at the 2000 Asian Athletics Championships was held in Jakarta, Indonesia on 28–30 August.

== Medalists ==
Gold	Silver	Bronze
Jamal Al-Saffar; Saudi Arabia	Anil Kumar Prakash; India	Yin Hanzhao; China

== Results ==
=== Heats ===
Wind:
Heat 1: -1.7 m/s, Heat 2: -1.8 m/s, Heat 3: -1.8 m/s, Heat 4: -2.1 m/s, Heat 5: -1.5 m/s

Rank	Heat	Name	Nationality	Time	Notes
1	5	Anil Kumar Prakash	India	10.53	Q
2	3	Vissanu Sophanich	Thailand	10.57	Q
2	4	Reanchai Sriharwong	Thailand	10.57	Q
4	4	Gennadiy Chernovol	Kazakhstan	10.60	Q
4	5	Yin Hanzhao	China	10.60	Q
6	3	Akihiro Yasui	Japan	10.68	Q
7	2	Jamal Al-Saffar	Saudi Arabia	10.69	Q
8	1	Chiang Wai Hung	Hong Kong	10.70	Q
8	2	Watson Nyambek	Malaysia	10.70	Q
8	3	Rajeev Balakrishnan	India	10.70	q
11	2	Mohamed Sultan Al-Sheib	Qatar	10.71	q
12	1	Kang Tae-Suk	South Korea	10.72	Q
13	4	Khaled Youssef Al-Obaidli	Qatar	10.76	q
13	5	Tetsuya Nakamura	Japan	10.76	q
15	5	To Wai Lok	Hong Kong	10.79	q
16	2	Yousef Dehmiri	Iran	10.84	q
17	3	Kim Sang-Do	South Korea	10.88	
18	1	Abdolghaffar Saghar	Iran	10.89	
19	3	Sukari	Indonesia	10.90	
20	1	John Muray	Indonesia	10.96	
21	4	Fayez Al-Bishi	Saudi Arabia	10.97	
22	3	Ali Khamis Rasheed	United Arab Emirates	10.98	
23	2	Erwin Heru Susanto	Indonesia	10.99	
24	5	Jihad Al-Sheikh	Oman	11.10	
25	4	Ali Yasir	Pakistan	11.22	
26	3	Khalifa Al-Majed	Bahrain	11.33	
27	1	Shahidul Islam	Bangladesh	11.41	
28	2	Mohamed Amir	Maldives	11.59	
29	1	Sisomphone Vongpharkdy	Laos	11.71	
30	2	Nguyen Thanh Hai	Vietnam	15.41	

=== Semifinals ===
Wind:
Heat 1: -1.1 m/s, Heat 2: -0.3 m/s

Rank	Heat	Name	Nationality	Time	Notes
1	2	Yin Hanzhao	China	10.42	Q
2	2	Reanchai Sriharwong	Thailand	10.42	Q
3	1	Vissanu Sophanich	Thailand	10.45	Q
4	1	Anil Kumar Prakash	India	10.47	Q
5	2	Khaled Youssef Al-Obaidli	Qatar	10.50	Q
6	2	Jamal Al-Saffar	Saudi Arabia	10.52	Q
7	2	Gennadiy Chernovol	Kazakhstan	10.56	
8	1	Akihiro Yasui	Japan	10.59	Q
8	1	Chiang Wai Hung	Hong Kong	10.59	Q
10	1	Mohamed Sultan Al-Sheib	Qatar	10.65	
11	1	Yousef Dehmiri	Iran	10.66	
12	1	Kang Tae-Suk	South Korea	10.68	
12	2	Rajeev Balakrishnan	India	10.68	
14	1	Watson Nyambek	Malaysia	10.69	
15	2	To Wai Lok	Hong Kong	10.70	
16	2	Tetsuya Nakamura	Japan	10.74	

=== Final ===
Wind: +0.2 m/s

Rank	Name	Nationality	Time	Notes
1st place, gold medalist(s)	Jamal Al-Saffar	Saudi Arabia	10.32	NR
2nd place, silver medalist(s)	Anil Kumar Prakash	India	10.35	
3rd place, bronze medalist(s)	Yin Hanzhao	China	10.36	
4	Vissanu Sophanich	Thailand	10.38	PB
5	Akihiro Yasui	Japan	10.43	
6	Khaled Youssef Al-Obaidli	Qatar	10.54	
7	Chiang Wai Hung	Hong Kong	10.58	
	Reanchai Sriharwong	Thailand	DNS	
