= 2002 European Athletics Championships – Men's 100 metres =

Men's 100 metres at the 2002 European Athletics Championships
- Venue: Olympiastadion
- Location: Munich
- Dates: 6-7 August
- Competitors: 45 from 24 nations
- Winning time: 10.06

Medalists
gold medal	Francis Obikwelu	Portugal
silver medal	Darren Campbell	Great Britain
bronze medal	Roland Németh	Hungary

The men's 100 metres at the 2002 European Athletics Championships were held at the Olympiastadion on August 6 and August 7.

== Results ==
KEY:	q	Fastest non-qualifiers	Q	Qualified	NR	National record	PB	Personal best	SB	Seasonal best

=== Round 1 ===
Qualification: First 4 in each heat (Q) and the next 8 fastest (q) advance to the Round 2.

Rank	Heat	Name	Nationality	Time	Notes
1	3	Georgios Theodoridis	Greece	10.24	Q
1	5	Roland Németh	Hungary	10.24	Q
3	5	Jason Gardener	United Kingdom	10.29	Q
4	1	Marc Blume	Germany	10.33	Q
5	1	Markus Pöyhönen	Finland	10.35	Q
5	4	Issa-Aimé Nthépé	France	10.35	Q
7	3	Darren Campbell	United Kingdom	10.36	Q
8	6	Kostyantyn Rurak	Ukraine	10.37	Q
9	2	Francis Obikwelu	Portugal	10.38	Q
10	1	Geir Moen	Norway	10.39	Q
10	2	Anatoliy Dovhal	Ukraine	10.39	Q
10	6	Francesco Scuderi	Italy	10.39	Q
10	6	Panagiotis Sarris	Greece	10.39	Q
10	6	Dejan Vojnović	Croatia	10.39	Q
15	2	John Ertzgaard	Norway	10.43	Q
15	5	Matic Osovnikar	Slovenia	10.43	Q
17	3	Alexander Kosenkow	Germany	10.44	Q
18	3	Rok Predanič	Slovenia	10.45	Q
19	4	Tommi Hartonen	Finland	10.46	Q
20	2	Fabrice Calligny	France	10.47	Q
20	4	Aristotelis Gavelas	Greece	10.47	Q
22	4	Maurizio Checcucci	Italy	10.48	Q
22	5	Luca Simoni	Italy	10.48	Q
24	3	Aham Okeke	Norway	10.49	q
25	4	Troy Douglas	Netherlands	10.50	q
25	5	Aleksandr Smirnov	Russia	10.50	q
25	5	Marc Kochan	Germany	10.50	q
28	1	Piotr Balcerzak	Poland	10.51	q
29	1	Jiří Vojtík	Czech Republic	10.54	q
30	3	Stefan Koivikko	Finland	10.55	q
30	6	Aleksandr Ryabov	Russia	10.55	q
32	2	Patrik Lövgren	Sweden	10.56	
33	3	Konstantin Vasyukov	Ukraine	10.57	
34	2	Sergey Bychkov	Russia	10.58	
34	4	Orkatz Beitia	Spain	10.58	
36	4	Bostjan Fridrih	Slovenia	10.59	
37	1	Aleksandr Porkhomovskiy	Israel	10.61	
37	6	Ryszard Pilarczyk	Poland	10.61	
39	3	Sergejs Inšakovs	Latvia	10.62	
40	6	Sébastien Gattuso	Monaco	10.70	
41	5	Gian Nicola Berardi	San Marino	10.73	
42	6	Gideon Jablonka	Israel	10.74	
43	5	Anninos Marcoullides	Cyprus	10.80	
44	2	Slobodan Spasić	FR Yugoslavia	10.81	
	1	Dwain Chambers	United Kingdom	DQ	

=== Round 2 ===
Qualification: First 4 in each heat (Q) advance to the semifinals.

Rank	Heat	Name	Nationality	Time	Notes
1	1	Georgios Theodoridis	Greece	10.25	Q
2	1	Jason Gardener	United Kingdom	10.28	Q
3	3	Darren Campbell	United Kingdom	10.29	Q
3	4	Marc Blume	Germany	10.29	Q
5	4	Anatoliy Dovhal	Ukraine	10.30	Q
6	2	Issa-Aimé Nthépé	France	10.31	Q
7	2	Markus Pöyhönen	Finland	10.32	Q
7	3	Roland Németh	Hungary	10.32	Q
9	2	Rok Predanič	Slovenia	10.33	Q
9	3	Francis Obikwelu	Portugal	10.33	Q
11	1	Troy Douglas	Netherlands	10.35	Q
11	3	Aristotelis Gavelas	Greece	10.35	Q
13	2	Kostyantyn Rurak	Ukraine	10.36	Q
14	4	Matic Osovnikar	Slovenia	10.38	Q
15	4	Maurizio Checcucci	Italy	10.39	
16	2	Geir Moen	Norway	10.41	
17	1	John Ertzgaard	Norway	10.42	Q
17	1	Francesco Scuderi	Italy	10.42	
17	3	Tommi Hartonen	Finland	10.42	
20	1	Dejan Vojnović	Croatia	10.45	
21	2	Panagiotis Sarris	Greece	10.46	
21	4	Fabrice Calligny	France	10.46	
23	2	Aleksandr Smirnov	Russia	10.48	
24	4	Stefan Koivikko	Finland	10.49	
25	2	Piotr Balcerzak	Poland	10.50	
25	4	Aham Okeke	Norway	10.50	
27	1	Aleksandr Ryabov	Russia	10.51	
28	1	Alexander Kosenkow	Germany	10.53	
29	3	Marc Kochan	Germany	10.62	
30	3	Luca Simoni	Italy	10.63	
31	3	Jiří Vojtík	Czech Republic	10.70	
	4	Dwain Chambers	United Kingdom	DQ	

=== Semifinals ===
Qualification: First 4 in each semifinal (Q) advance to the final.

Rank	Heat	Name	Nationality	Time	Notes
1	2	Francis Obikwelu	Portugal	10.12	Q
2	2	Georgios Theodoridis	Greece	10.24	Q
3	2	Darren Campbell	United Kingdom	10.30	Q
4	1	Issa-Aimé Nthépé	France	10.31	Q
5	2	Roland Németh	Hungary	10.32	Q
6	2	Rok Predanič	Slovenia	10.33	
7	1	Aristotelis Gavelas	Greece	10.34	Q
8	1	Markus Pöyhönen	Finland	10.35	Q
9	1	Troy Douglas	Netherlands	10.36	
10	1	Jason Gardener	United Kingdom	10.36	
11	2	Kostyantyn Rurak	Ukraine	10.38	
12	2	Marc Blume	Germany	10.38	
13	1	Anatoliy Dovhal	Ukraine	10.40	
14	2	John Ertzgaard	Norway	10.45	
15	1	Matic Osovnikar	Slovenia	10.49	
	1	Dwain Chambers	United Kingdom	DQ	

=== Final ===
Rank	Name	Nationality	Time	Notes
1st place, gold medalist(s)	Francis Obikwelu	Portugal	10.06	NR
2nd place, silver medalist(s)	Darren Campbell	United Kingdom	10.15	
3rd place, bronze medalist(s)	Roland Németh	Hungary	10.27	
4	Markus Pöyhönen	Finland	10.31	
5	Issa-Aimé Nthépé	France	10.32	
6	Aristotelis Gavelas	Greece	10.36	
	Georgios Theodoridis	Greece		DQ
	Dwain Chambers	United Kingdom	9.96	DQ
