= Athletics at the 2003 Pan American Games – Men's 4 × 100 metres relay =

Men's 4 × 100 metres relay at the Pan American Games

The men's 4 × 100 metres relay event at the 2003 Pan American Games was held on August 8–9. The original winners, the United States, were later disqualified after one of their members, Mickey Grimes, was found guilty of ephedrine doping.

== Medalists ==
| Gold | Silver | Bronze |
|---|---|---|
| Brazil; Vicente de Lima; Édson Ribeiro; André da Silva; Claudinei da Silva; Cláudio Roberto Souza*; Jarbas Mascarenhas* | Trinidad and Tobago; Nicconnor Alexander; Marc Burns; Ato Boldon; Darrel Brown | Cuba; José Ángel César; José Carlos Peña; Luis Alexander Reyes; Juan Pita |

*Athletes who competed in heats only.

== Results ==
=== Heats ===
Qualification: First 3 teams of each heat (Q) plus the next 2 fastest (q) qualified for the final.

| Rank | Heat | Nation | Athletes | Time | Notes |
|---|---|---|---|---|---|
| 1 | 1 | Trinidad and Tobago | Nicconnor Alexander, Marc Burns, Ato Boldon, Darrel Brown | 38.97 | Q |
| 2 | 1 | Jamaica | Michael Frater, Clement Campbell, Christopher Williams, Sheldon Morant | 39.02 | Q |
| 3 | 1 | Brazil | Vicente de Lima, Édson Ribeiro, Cláudio Roberto Souza, Jarbas Mascarenhas | 39.10 | Q |
| 4 | 2 | Cuba | José Ángel César, José Carlos Peña, Luis Alexander Reyes, Juan Pita | 39.50 | Q |
| 5 | 2 | Bahamas | Michael Reckley, Clement Taylor, Jamial Rolle, Derrick Atkins | 39.91 | Q |
| 6 | 2 | Netherlands Antilles | Geronimo Goeloe, Charlton Raffaela, Jairo Duzant, Churandy Martina | 39.95 | q |
| 7 | 1 | Saint Kitts and Nevis | Kevin Arthurton, Irvin Browne, Donnell Esdaille, Delwayne Delaney | 40.37 | q |
| 8 | 1 | Dominica | Sherwin James, Chris Lloyd, Fabian Florant, Kenneth John | 40.68 | |
| 9 | 2 | Cayman Islands | Ronald Forbes, Stephen Johnson, André Burton, Kareem Streete-Thompson | 41.10 | |
| 10 | 2 | Belize | Orson Elrington, Michael Aguilar, Leonard Arnold, Jayson Jones | 42.23 | NR |
| | 2 | United States | Mickey Grimes, Jason Smoots, Marcelle Scales, Olan Coleman | DQ | Doping |
| | 1 | Dominican Republic | Juan Liriano, Luis Morillo, Juan Sainfleur, Joel Baez | DNF | |
| | 2 | Ecuador | | DNS | |

=== Final ===
| Rank | Nation | Athletes | Time | Notes |
|---|---|---|---|---|
| 1st place, gold medalist(s) | Brazil | Vicente de Lima, Édson Ribeiro, André da Silva, Claudinei da Silva | 38.44 | |
| 2nd place, silver medalist(s) | Trinidad and Tobago | Nicconnor Alexander, Marc Burns, Ato Boldon, Darrel Brown | 38.53 | NR |
| 3rd place, bronze medalist(s) | Cuba | José Ángel César, José Carlos Peña, Luis Alexander Reyes, Juan Pita | 39.09 | |
| 4 | Netherlands Antilles | Geronimo Goeloe, Charlton Raffaela, Jairo Duzant, Churandy Martina | 39.19 | NR |
| 5 | Bahamas | Michael Reckley, Clement Taylor, Jamial Rolle, Derrick Atkins | 39.72 | |
| 6 | Saint Kitts and Nevis | Kevin Arthurton, Irvin Browne, Donnell Esdaille, Delwayne Delaney | 40.37 | |
| | Jamaica | Michael Frater, Clement Campbell, Christopher Williams, Sheldon Morant | DQ | |
| | United States | Mickey Grimes, Jason Smoots, Kenny Brokenburr, Olan Coleman | DQ | Doping |
