= Athletics at the 1998 Asian Games – Men's 4 × 100 metres relay =

Men's 4 × 100 metres relay at the 1998 Asian Games
- Venue: Thammasat Stadium
- Dates: 15 December 1998
- Competitors: 24 from 7 nations

Medalists
gold medal	Japan; Yasukatsu Otsuki, Shin Kubota, Hiroyasu Tsuchie, Koji Ito
silver medal	Thailand; Niti Piyapan, Reanchai Seeharwong, Worasit Vechaphut, Vissanu Sophanich
bronze medal	Oman; Hamoud Al-Dalhami, Mohammed Al-Hooti, Jahad Al-Sheikh, Ahmed Al-Moamari

The men's 4 × 100 metres relay competition at the 1998 Asian Games in Bangkok, Thailand was held on 15 December at the Thammasat Stadium.

== Schedule ==
All times are Indochina Time (UTC+07:00)

Date	Time	Event
Thursday, 15 December 1998	17:20	Final

== Results ==
Legend

- DNS — Did not start
- DSQ — Disqualified

Rank	Team	Time	Notes
1st place, gold medalist(s)	Japan (JPN); Yasukatsu Otsuki; Shin Kubota; Hiroyasu Tsuchie; Koji Ito	38.91	GR
2nd place, silver medalist(s)	Thailand (THA); Niti Piyapan; Reanchai Seeharwong; Worasit Vechaphut; Vissanu Sophanich	39.17	
3rd place, bronze medalist(s)	Oman (OMA); Hamoud Al-Dalhami; Mohammed Al-Hooti; Jahad Al-Sheikh; Ahmed Al-Moamari	40.26	
4	Hong Kong (HKG); Ho Kwan Lung; Chiang Wai Hung; Tang Hon Sing; William To	40.96	
5	China (CHN); Zhou Wei; Lin Wei; Yin Hanzhao; Han Chaoming	51.53	
—	Qatar (QAT); Jassim Abbas; Saad Muftah Al-Kuwari; Sulaiman Jama Yusuf; Hamad Mubarak Al-Dosari	DSQ	
—	Tajikistan (TJK) — — — —	DNS	
