= Alfred Moussambani =

Medal record

Men's athletics

Representing Cameroon

African Championships
| Bronze medal – third place | 1996 Yaoundé | 4×100 m |

Alfred Émile Moussambani (born February 25, 1974) is a Cameroonian sprinter who specializes in the 100 metres. He represented his native country in the 1996 and 2000 Olympics as a member of his nation's 4 × 100 metres relay team. Neither team advanced. The other members of the 1996 team were Benjamin Sirimou, Aimé-Issa Nthépé and Claude Toukéné-Guébogo. Members of the 2000 team were Serge Bengono, II, Joseph Batangdon, and Benjamin Sirimou.

Together with Serge Mbegomo, Claude Toukene and Joseph Batangdon he finished seventh in the 4 × 100 m relay final at the 2002 Commonwealth Games and again at the 2006 Commonwealth Games.

He was also a member of his national team at the 1997, 2001 and 2003 World Championships.

His personal bests are:

- 60 m indoors 6.75 Liévin 17.02.2002
- 100 m 10.42 +1.5 St-Etienne 30.06.2001
- 200 m 21.80 +1.5 Tergnier 09.05.2002

He also ran 100 m in 10.33 but with a +4.1 wind.
