= Moussambani =

Moussambani is an African surname. Notable people with the surname include:

- Alfred Moussambani (born 1974), Cameroonian sprinter
- Eric Moussambani (born 1978), Equatoguinean swimmer
