= José Ángel César =

Cuban sprinter (born 1978)

José César
Personal information
- Full name: José Ángel César Delgado
- Born: January 4, 1978 (age 48) La Lisa, La Habana
- Height: 1.78 m (5 ft 10 in)
- Weight: 75 kg (165 lb)

Sport
- Country: Cuba
- Sport: Athletics
Medal record
Men's Athletics
Representing Cuba
Olympic Games
| Bronze medal – third place | 2000 Sydney | 4x100 m relay |
Pan American Games
| Bronze medal – third place | 2003 Santo Domingo | 4x100 m relay |
- Updated on 21 May 2013

José Ángel César Delgado (born 3 January 1978) is a retired Cuban athlete who competed mainly in the 100 metres.

== Career ==
He competed for Cuba in the 2000 Summer Olympics held in Sydney, Australia in the 4 x 100 metre relay where he won the bronze medal with his teammates Luis Alberto Pérez-Rionda, Ivan Garcia and Freddy Mayola.

== Achievements ==
| Year | Competition | Venue | Position | Event | Notes |
Representing Cuba
| 2000 | Ibero-American Championships | Rio de Janeiro, Brazil | 2nd | 4 × 100 m relay | 38.97 s |
| 2000 | Olympic Games | Sydney, Australia | 3rd | 4 × 100 m relay | 38.04 s |
| 2005 | ALBA Games | La Habana, Cuba | 3rd | 100 m | 10.67 s (wind: -0.8 m/s) |
| 2005 | ALBA Games | La Habana, Cuba | 1st | 4 × 100 m relay | 40.08 s |
