= Momirović =

Momirović (Cyrillic: Момировић) is a surname of Serbian origin. Notable people with the surname include:

- Predrag Momirović (born 1977), Serbian sprinter
- Tomislav Momirović (born 1983), Serbian businessman and politician
