= McAdorey =

McAdorey is a surname. Notable people with the surname include:

- Bob McAdorey (1935–2005), Canadian television and radio broadcaster
- John McAdorey (1974–2019), Irish sprinter
- Michelle McAdorey (fl. 1981), Canadian singer-songwriter
