= Yanes =

Yanes is a Spanish patronymic surname, a variant of Yáñez, and given name. Notable people with the name include:

== Surname ==
- Agustín Díaz Yanes (born 1950), Spanish screenwriter and film director
- Allen Yanes (born 1997), Guatemalan footballer
- César Yanes Urías (1920–2024), Salvadoran naval officer and politician
- Elías Yanes Álvarez (1928–2018), Spanish Roman Catholic bishop
- Hely Yánes (born 1967), Venezuelan boxer
- Luis Yanes (born 1982), Colombian footballer
- Oscar Yanes (1927–2013), Venezuelan journalist and writer
- Romulo Yanes (1959–2021), American photographer

== Given name ==
- Yanes Raubaba (born 1974), Indonesian sprinter
