= Konstantin Zhuravlyov =

Uzbekistani sprinter

Personal information
- Nationality: Uzbekistani
- Born: 13 February 1976 (age 50)

Sport
- Sport: Sprinting
- Event: 4 × 100 metres relay

Konstantin Zhuravlyov (born 13 February 1976) is an Uzbekistani sprinter. He competed in the men's 4 × 100 metres relay at the 2000 Summer Olympics.
