= Chinnain Thirugnanadurai =

Indian sprinter

Personal information
- Nationality: Indian
- Born: 1 May 1974 (age 52) usilumpat, Madurai district, Tamil nadu

Sport
- Country: India
- Sport: Track and field
- Event: Sprints
- Retired: yes

Achievements and titles
- Personal best(s): 100 m: 10.40 (Lucknow 1999)
Medal record
Afro-Asian Games
Bronze medal – third place	2003 Hyderabad	4×100 m relay

Chinnain Thirugnanadurai also written as Chinnain Thirugnan Durai and Thirugnan Durai (born 1 May 1974) is an Indian former sprinter. He competed in the men's 4 × 100 metres relay at the 2000 Summer Olympics. He won a bronze medal at the 2003 Afro-Asian Games.
