= Nikolay Yeroshenko =

Uzbekistani sprinter

Personal information
- Nationality: Uzbekistani
- Born: 9 February 1975 (age 51)

Sport
- Sport: Sprinting
- Event: 4 × 100 metres relay

Nikolay Yeroshenko (born 9 February 1975) is an Uzbekistani sprinter. He competed in the men's 4 × 100 metres relay at the 2000 Summer Olympics.
