= Miloš Šakić =

Serbian sprinter

Personal information
- Nationality: Serbian
- Born: 2 September 1979 (age 46)

Sport
- Sport: Sprinting
- Event: 4 × 100 metres relay

Miloš Šakić (born 2 September 1979) is a Serbian sprinter. He competed in the men's 4 × 100 metres relay at the 2000 Summer Olympics representing Yugoslavia.
