= Andrea Colombo =

Italian sprinter (born 1974)

Personal information
- Nationality: Italian
- Born: 14 February 1974 (age 52) Bollate, Italy
- Height: 1.90 m (6 ft 3 in)
- Weight: 75 kg (165 lb)

Sport
- Country: Italy
- Sport: Athletics
- Event: Sprint
- Club: Snam San Donato

Achievements and titles
- Personal bests: 100 m: 10.23 (1999); 200 m: 20.60 (2001)
Medal record
| Event | 1st | 2nd | 3rd |
|---|---|---|---|
| Universiade | 0 | 0 | 3 |
| Mediterranean Games | 1 | 1 | 0 |
| European Cup | 1 | 0 | 2 |
| European Junior Championships | 1 | 0 | 0 |
Universiade
| Bronze medal – third place | 1995 Fukuoka | 4x400 m relay |
| Bronze medal – third place | 1999 Palma de Mallorca | 4x400 m relay |
| Bronze medal – third place | 2001 Beijing | 4x400 m relay |
Mediterranean Games
| Gold medal – first place | 2001 Tunis | 4x400 m relay |
| Silver medal – second place | 2001 Tunis | 200 m |
European Junior Championships
| Gold medal – first place | 1993 San Sebastián | 200 m |

Andrea Colombo (born 14 February 1974 in Bollate) is an Italian sprinter who specialized in the 100 metres.

He won nine medals (eight at senior level), at the International athletics competitions, seven of these with national relays team.

== Biography ==
He finished seventh in 4 x 100 metres relay at the 2000 Olympic Games, together with teammates Francesco Scuderi, Alessandro Cavallaro and Maurizio Checcucci. He also won the gold medal in 200 metres at the 1993 European Junior Championships, and at the 2001 Mediterranean Games he won the silver medal in 200 metres and the gold medal in relay. He also competed at the 1999 World Championships in Athletics, in relay, without reaching the final.

His personal best times were 10.23 seconds in the 100 metres, achieved in September 1999 in Rieti; and 20.60 seconds in the 200 metres, achieved at the 2001 Mediterranean Games.

== Olympic results ==
| Year | Competition | Venue | Position | Event | Time | Notes |
|---|---|---|---|---|---|---|
| 2000 | Olympic Games | (Australia) Sydney | 7th | 4×100 metres | 38.67 | |

== National titles ==
He has won 1 time the individual national championship.

- 1 win in the 100 metres (1999)

== See also ==
- Italy national relay team
