= Bernard Williams (sprinter) =

American track and field athlete, sprinter, Olympic gold medalist

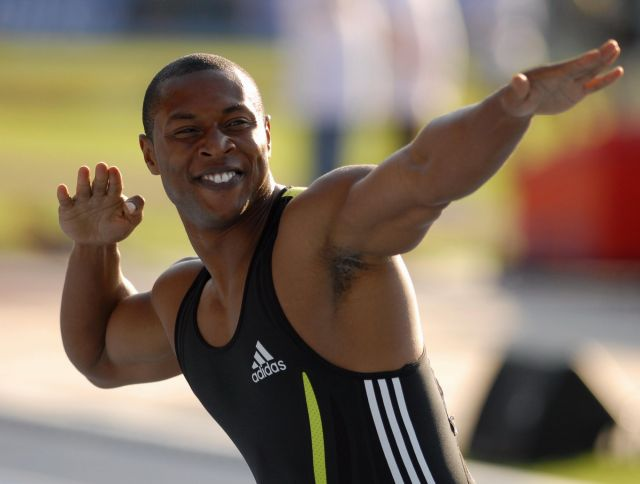
- Williams during Keien Meeting 2007

Personal information
- Full name: Bernard Rollen Williams III
- National team: United States
- Born: January 19, 1978 (age 48) Baltimore, Maryland, U.S.
- Height: 6 ft 0 in (1.83 m)
- Weight: 178 lb (81 kg)

Sport
- Sport: Track and field
- Events: 100 meters, 200 meters
- College team: University of Florida
- Coached by: Mike Holloway

Achievements and titles
- Personal bests: 100 m: 9.94 (2001); 200 m: 20.01 (2004)
Medal record
Men's athletics
Representing the United States
Olympic Games
Gold medal – first place	2000 Sydney	4 × 100 m relay
Silver medal – second place	2004 Athens	200 m
World Championships
Gold medal – first place	2003 Paris	4 × 100 m relay
Silver medal – second place	2001 Edmonton	100 m
Pan American Games
Gold medal – first place	1999 Winnipeg	100 m

Bernard Rollen Williams III (born January 19, 1978) is an American male former track and field sprinter and winner of a gold medal in 4 × 100-meter relay at the 2000 Summer Olympics. He was the 200-meter dash silver medalist at the 2004 Summer Olympics and the 100-meter dash silver medalist at the 2001 World Championships in Athletics. He also won relay gold at the 2003 World Championships in Athletics and was the 100 m gold medalist at the 1999 Pan American Games.

He has broken the 10-second barrier and holds a personal record of 9.94 seconds in the 100 m. Williams was the fastest man in the 200 m at the 2003 season with a personal record of 20.01 seconds. He won the American national title in the 100 m at the USA Outdoor Track and Field Championships in 2001 and 2003. He competed collegiately for the Florida Gators and was NCAA Outdoor champion in the 100 m and 4 × 100 m relay in 2000.

== Biography ==
Born in Baltimore, Maryland, Bernard Williams won the 100 meters at the 1999 Pan American Games.

Williams accepted an athletic scholarship to attend the University of Florida in Gainesville, Florida, where he was a member of the Florida Gators track and field team. He graduated from the university with a bachelor's degree in sociology in 2008.

In 2000, Williams won the NCAA Championships in the 100 meters and 4 × 100 m relay as a Florida Gator sprinter. He ran the second leg on the gold medal-winning American 4 × 100 m relay team at the 2000 Summer Olympics in Sydney. The teams extravagant celebrations drew criticism at the time. Acquiring the nickname "Hollywood", he was personally noted for his comedy antics during the 2000 Olympics, including using "the people's eyebrow" – a pose used by then-professional wrestler Dwayne "The Rock" Johnson. Also, known for his pre race antics and poses playing to any crowd, which grew to be increasingly accepted in the sport following the celebrations of multiple Olympic champion Usain Bolt.

At the 2001 World Championships, Williams finished third but was given the silver medal for the 100 meters when (Tim Montgomery) was discovered to have used steroids. Williams also ran the second leg on the American 4 × 100 m relay team, which won the gold medal. The team's gold medals were withdrawn when Tim Montgomery was discovered to have used steroids. Williams was upgraded to 100 m national champion as a result of this disqualification, however.

In 2003, Williams won the US National Championships in 100 meters and was fifth in 100 meters at the 2003 World Championships. He was also a member of gold medal-winning American relay team. He tested positive for cannabis and received a warning from the USADA in August 2004, but was still able to compete in the Olympics in accordance with IAAF rules.

At the 2004 Summer Olympics, Williams won the silver medal in 200 meters, edging compatriot and 100 meters champion Justin Gatlin in the final few meters. Thus, Americans won all three top places, since Shawn Crawford won the gold. The Americans performed to a booing audience, as the Greeks protested the exclusion of the 2000 Olympic champion Kostas Kenteris for doping.

Bernard works as a Sports Performance Coach in the Maryland, Washington, D.C., and Virginia area.

== Personal bests ==
Event	Time (seconds)	Venue	Date
55 meters	6.20	Gainesville, Florida, United States	February 6, 2000
60 meters	6.56	Colorado Springs, Colorado, United States	February 12, 1999
100 meters	9.94	Edmonton, Alberta, Canada	August 5, 2001
200 meters	20.01	Brussels, Belgium	August 24, 2001

== International competitions ==
Year	Competition	Venue	Position	Event	Notes
1999	Pan American Games	Winnipeg, Canada	1st	100 m	10.08
1999	Pan American Games	Winnipeg, Canada	4th	4 × 100 m relay	39.00
2000	Olympic Games	Sydney, Australia	1st	4 × 100 m relay	37.61
2001	World Championships	Edmonton, Canada	2nd	100 m	9.94
2001	World Championships	Edmonton, Canada	DQ	4 × 100 m relay	37.96
2001	Grand Prix Final	Melbourne, Australia	2nd	200 m	20.39
2003	World Championships	Paris, France	4th	100 m	10.13
2003	World Championships	Paris, France	1st	4 × 100 m relay	38.02
2003	World Athletics Final	Monte Carlo, Monaco	1st	100 m	10.04
2003	World Athletics Final	Monte Carlo, Monaco	6th	200 m	20.80
2004	Olympic Games	Athens, Greece	2nd	200 m	20.01

== National titles ==
- USA Outdoor Track and Field Championships
  - 100 m: 2001, 2003
- NCAA Men's Outdoor Track and Field Championships
  - 100 m: 2000
  - 4 × 100 m relay: 2000

== See also ==
- List of Olympic medalists in athletics (men)
- List of men's Olympic and World Championship athletics sprint champions
- List of medal sweeps in Olympic athletics
- List of Pan American Games medalists in athletics (men)
- List of 2000 Summer Olympics medal winners
- List of 2004 Summer Olympics medal winners
- 200 metres at the Olympics
- 4 × 100 metres relay at the Olympics
- 100 metres at the World Championships in Athletics
- 4 × 100 metres relay at the World Championships in Athletics
- List of 100 metres national champions (men)
- List of University of Florida alumni
- List of University of Florida Olympians
- List of doping cases in athletics
- List of athletes from Maryland N – Z
- List of people from Gainesville, Florida
- List of people with surname Williams

Achievements
Preceded by Shawn Crawford; Konstadinos Kederis	Men's 200m Best Year Performance; 2003	Succeeded by {Shawn Crawford
