= Ajay Raj Singh =

Indian sprinter

Personal information
- Nationality: Indian
- Born: 1 May 1978 (age 48)

Sport
- Sport: Sprinting
- Event: 4 × 100 metres relay

Ajay Raj Singh (born 1 May 1978) is an Indian sprinter. He competed in the men's 4 × 100 metres relay at the 2000 Summer Olympics.
