= Alessandro Cavallaro =

Italian sprinter

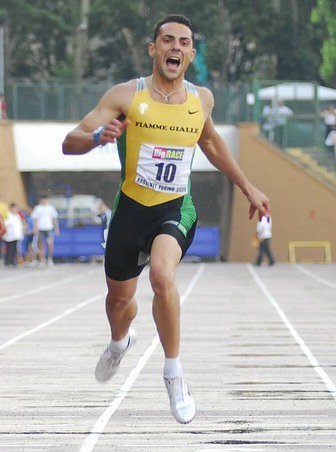

Personal information
- Nationality: Italian
- Born: 22 February 1980 (age 46) Paternò, Italy
- Height: 1.80 m (5 ft 11 in)
- Weight: 74 kg (163 lb)

Sport
- Country: Italy
- Sport: Athletics
- Event: Sprint
- Club: G.S. Fiamme Gialle

Achievements and titles
- Personal bests: 100 m: 10.35 (2003); 200 m: 20.42 (2003)

Alessandro Cavallaro (born 22 February 1980, in Paternò) is an Italian sprinter who specialized in the 200 metres.

== Biography ==
He finished seventh in 4 x 100 metres relay at the 2000 Olympic Games, together with teammates Francesco Scuderi, Maurizio Checcucci and Andrea Colombo. He also won the gold medal at the 1999 European Junior Championships, and competed at the 2002 European Championships, the 2003 World Championships and the 2006 European Championships without reaching the final.

His personal best times were 10.35 seconds in the 100 metres, achieved in May 2003 in Catania; 20.42 seconds in the 200 metres, achieved at the 2003 World Championships and 46.33 seconds in the 400 metres, achieved in May 2001 in Catania.

== Olympic results ==
Year	Competition	Venue	Position	Event	Time	Notes
2000	Olympic Games	(Australia) Sydney	7th	4×100 metres	38.67	

== See also ==
- Italian all-time lists - 200 metres
- Italy national relay team
