= Tom Comyns =

Irish sprinter

Personal information
- Nationality: Irish
- Born: 26 June 1973 (age 53) County Limerick, Ireland

Sport
- Sport: Sprinting
- Event: 4 × 100 metres relay

Tom Comyns (born 26 June 1973) is an Irish former sprinter who is now a lecturer at the University of Limerick. He competed in the men's 4 × 100 metres relay at the 2000 Summer Olympics.
