= Andrew Reyes =

Liberian sprinter

Andrew Reyes OLY
Personal information
- National team: Liberia
- Born: 13 November 1974 (age 51)

Sport
- Sport: Sprinting
- Event: 4 × 100 metres relay

Andrew Garpu Reyes (born 13 November 1974) is a Liberian sprinter. He competed in the men's 4 × 100 metres relay at the 2000 Summer Olympics.
