= Nnamdi Anusim =

Nigerian sprinter (born 1972)

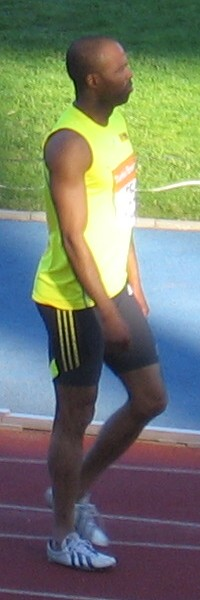
- Nnamdi Anusim in 2009

Personal information
- Nationality: Nigerian
- Born: 11 July 1972 (age 54) Owerri, Nigeria

Sport
- Sport: Sprinting
- Event: 4 × 100 metres relay
Medal record
Men's athletics
Representing Nigeria
African Championships
Gold medal – first place	1990 Cairo	4×100 m

Nnamdi Anusim (born 11 July 1972) is a Nigerian sprinter. He competed in the men's 4 × 100 metres relay at the 2000 Summer Olympics.
