= Boonyarit Phuksachat =

Thai sprinter (born 1978)

Personal information
- Nationality: Thai
- Born: 25 August 1978 (age 47)

Sport
- Sport: Sprinting
- Event: 4 × 100 metres relay

Boonyarit Phuksachat (born 25 August 1978) is a Thai sprinter. He competed in the men's 4 × 100 metres relay at the 2000 Summer Olympics.
