= Tihomir Buinjac =

Croatian sprinter

Personal information
- Nationality: Croatian
- Born: 28 February 1974 (age 52) Luzern, Switzerland
- Height: 188 cm (6 ft 2 in)
- Weight: 84 kg (185 lb)

Sport
- Sport: Sprinting
- Event: 4 × 100 metres relay
- Club: Atletski Klub Dynamo Zrinjevac Zagreb

Tihomir Buinjac (born 28 February 1974) is a Croatian sprinter. He competed in the men's 4 × 100 metres relay at the 2000 Summer Olympics. He is member of Croatian record relay 4 × 100 m team with 39.76 sec. Personal best on 100m is 10.2 sec. He retired from International career in 2001.
