= Wellington Saunders Whymms =

Bahamian sprinter (born 1972)

Wellington Saunders Whymms (born 6 April 1972) is a former Bahamian sprinter who ran the second leg for the Bahamian men's 4 × 100 m team at the 2000 Summer Olympics. The team narrowly missed advancing past its first heat.
