= Predrag Momirović =

Serbian sprinter

Personal information
- Nationality: Serbian
- Born: 19 July 1977 (age 48)

Sport
- Sport: Sprinting
- Event: 4 × 100 metres relay

Predrag Momirović (born 19 July 1977) is a Serbian sprinter. He competed in the men's 4 × 100 metres relay at the 2000 Summer Olympics representing Yugoslavia.
