= José Meneses =

Guatemalan sprinter (born 1980)

Personal information
- Nationality: Guatemalan
- Born: 8 September 1980 (age 45)

Sport
- Sport: Sprinting
- Event: 4 × 100 metres relay

José Haroldo Meneses (born 8 September 1980) is a Guatemalan sprinter. He competed in the men's 4 × 100 metres relay at the 2000 Summer Olympics.
