= Jahad Al-Sheikh =

Omani sprinter

Jahad Abdullah Al-Sheikh
Personal information
- Nationality: Omani
- Born: 5 August 1972 (age 53)

Sport
- Sport: Sprinting
- Event: 4 × 100 metres relay

Jahad Abdullah Al-Sheikh (born 5 August 1972) is an Omani sprinter. He competed in the men's 4 × 100 metres relay at the 2000 Summer Olympics.
