= Rajeev Bala Krishnan =

Indian sprinter

Personal information
- Nationality: Indian
- Born: 31 March 1971 (age 55)

Sport
- Sport: Sprinting
- Event: 100 metres 200 metres 4 × 100 metres relay

Rajeev Bala Krishnan (born 31 March 1971) is an Indian sprinter. He competed in the men's 4 × 100 metres relay at the 2000 Summer Olympics.

== Personal bests ==
100 metres – 10.40 (+2.0 m/s, Bengaluru, 5 July 2000)

200 metres – 21.44 (+1.6 m/s, Long Beach CA, 10 June 2000)
