= Tim Harden =

American former athlete (born 1974)

Personal information
- Full name: Timothy M. Harden
- Born: January 27, 1974 (age 52) Kansas City, Missouri, U.S.

Sport
- College team: Kentucky Wildcats
Medal record
Men's athletics (track and field)
Representing the United States
Olympic Games
Silver medal – second place	1996 Atlanta	4 × 100 m relay
World Indoor Championships
Gold medal – first place	2001 Lisbon	60 m
Silver medal – second place	1999 Maebashi	60 m

Timothy M. Harden (born January 27, 1974) is an American former athlete who competed mainly in the 100 metres. Harden was born in Kansas City, Missouri, where he graduated from Northeast High School in 1992. He also attended the University of Kentucky. He is also the 2001 indoor world champion and 1999 world indoor silver medallist behind Maurice Greene.

He competed for the United States in the 1996 Summer Olympics held in Atlanta, United States in the 4 × 100 metre relay where he won the silver medal with his teammates Jon Drummond, Michael Marsh and Dennis Mitchell. He also competed in the 60 m sprint with a personal best of 6.43, which ranks him 7th all-time.
