= Oleg Juravlyov =

Uzbekistani sprinter

Personal information
- Full name: Oleg Borisovich Juravlyov
- Nationality: Uzbekistan
- Born: 17 May 1982 (age 44) Tashkent, Uzbek SSR, Soviet Union
- Height: 1.84 m (6 ft 1/2 in)
- Weight: 74 kg (163 lb)

Sport
- Sport: Athletics
- Event: Sprint

Achievements and titles
- Personal bests: 100 m: 10.40 s (2008); 200 m: 20.74 s (2008)

Oleg Borisovich Juravlyov (Uzbek: Олег Борисович Журавлёв; born May 17, 1982, in Tashkent) is an Uzbekistani sprinter. He is a two-time national champion for the 100 and 200 metres.He was also a member of the national sprint relay team at the 2000 Summer Olympics in Sydney.

Juravlyov represented Uzbekistan at the 2008 Summer Olympics in Beijing, where he competed for the men's 200 metres. He ran in the fifth heat against eight other athletes, including Jamaican track star Usain Bolt, who eventually won the gold medal in the final. He finished the sprint race in eighth place by approximately half a second (0.51) behind Lebanon's Mohamad Siraj Tamim, with a time of 22.31 seconds. However, he failed to advance to the quarterfinals, as he placed sixtieth overall and was ranked below three mandatory slots for the next round.
