= Llewelyn Bredwood =

Jamaican sprinter

Personal information
- Nationality: Jamaican
- Born: 30 April 1976 (age 50)

Sport
- Sport: Sprinting
- Event: 4 × 100 metres relay
- College team: University of South Florida

Llewelyn Bredwood (born 30 April 1976) is a Jamaican sprinter. He competed in the men's 4 × 100 metres relay at the 2000 Summer Olympics. Bredwood ran for the University of South Florida in college.
