= Sukari (athlete) =

Indonesian sprinter

Personal information
- Nationality: Indonesian
- Born: 4 August 1974 (age 51)

Sport
- Sport: Sprinting
- Event: 4 × 100 metres relay

Sukari (born 4 August 1974) is an Indonesian sprinter. He competed in the men's 4 × 100 metres relay at the 2000 Summer Olympics.
