= Matic Šušteršič =

Slovenian sprinter (1980–2005)

Personal information
- Nationality: Slovenian
- Born: 27 February 1980
- Died: 5 June 2005 (aged 25)

Sport
- Sport: Sprinting
- Event: 4 × 100 metres relay

Matic Šušteršič (27 February 1980 – 5 June 2005) was a Slovenian sprinter. He competed in the men's 4 × 100 metres relay at the 2000 Summer Olympics.

On 5 June 2005, while still an active competitor, Šušteršič died in a car accident along with two other young Slovenian athletes Patrik Cvetan (23) and Nejc Lipnik (17).
