= Aleksandr Smirnov (sprinter) =

Russian sprinter

Personal information
- Nationality: Russian
- Born: 25 February 1974 (age 52) Petrozavodsk, Soviet Union

Sport
- Sport: Sprinting
- Event: 4 × 100 metres relay

Aleksandr Smirnov (born 25 February 1974) is a Russian sprinter. He competed in the men's 4 × 100 metres relay at the 2000 Summer Olympics.
