= Anil Kumar Prakash =

Indian athlete

Sapper Anil Kumar
Personal information
- Nationality: India
- Born: 28 August 1978 (age 48) Alappuzha district, Kerala, India
- Height: 1.74 m (5 ft 8 1/2 in)
- Weight: 75 kg (165 lb; 11.8 st)
- Military career
- Allegiance: India
- Branch: Indian Army
- Rank: Sapper
- Unit: Madras Engineer Group

Sport
- Country: India
- Sport: Track and field
- Events: 100 metres, 200 metres
- Club: Services

Achievements and titles
- Personal bests: 100 m: 10.21 (Bangalore 2000) NR; 200 m: 20.73 (Bangalore 2000)
Medal record
Men's athletics
Representing India
Asian Championships
Silver medal – second place	2000 Jakarta	100 m

Sapper Anil Kumar Prakash (born 28 August 1978) is a retired Indian sprinter. He held the 100 metres national record of 10.30 s set at the National Circuit Athletic Meet held in New Delhi in 2005 which was broken in 2016.

He previously held the National Record at 10.21 seconds.

== Early life ==
Kumar was born on 28 August 1978 in Alappuzha district in the Indian State of Kerala. He studied at T. K. Madhava Memorial College, Nangiarkulangara. He took up decathlon in his college days and later took to sprints inspired by the successes of the P. T. Usha.

In 1994, he joined the Madras Engineer Group via sports quota. Running in the Army Championships the same year, he was timed at 10.30 seconds in the 100 metres heats on a handheld stopwatch, and attributing it to human error, a second was added to make it 11.30 seconds. In the semifinal and final, he was again timed at 10.30 seconds. In 1996, at an event in Hyderabad, again with the handheld stopwatches, he was timed at 9.99 seconds, which however was not considered official and hence couldn't be attributed as a record. The "perplexed people" had to measure the track if it was really 100 metres.

== Professional career ==
Kumar's first big success came at National Open Championships in 1997 in Gandhinagar, when he broke Rajeev Balakrishnan's record of 100 metres to become the fastest man in India. Injury kept him off the field for some time before success came again in 1999 at the Fifth National Games in Manipur when he clocked 10.58 s in the 100 metres and a 21.35 s in 200 metres. In the same year on 15 August, Kumar broke the National record for 100 m when he clocked 10.33 s while finishing behind Sri Lanka’s Chinthaka De Soysa (10.29) (Sreelankan National record) in an International Circuit Meet held at Chennai. In 2000, he posted his personal best time of 10.21 s in Bangalore but in the absence of doping control the time was not ratified by the Athletics Federation of India.

On 17 July 2000, Kumar broke the 200 metres National record with an effort of 20.73 s at the National Circuit Athletic Meet held in Bangalore. He erased the then National record of 21.04 s in the name of Ajay Raj Singh, set in the Lucknow inter-State meet in 1999.

On 1 May 2002, in the National Circuit Athletic Meet at the Nehru Stadium in New Delhi, India's fastest runner equaled his own National record in 100 metres with a time of 10.33 s. In the same month, Kumar came up with a commendable performance to win the 100 m dash in the second domestic circuit meet in Bangalore with an effort of 10.46 s. In May 2004, he won the 200 m sprint in the Federation Cup Athletics Championships at the Nehru Stadium when he clocked 21.02 s. A few weeks later he crowned again in the 200 m dash by clocking 20.84 s at the first ONGC National Athletics Circuit Meet in Delhi.

He is currently a trainer at Sports Authority of India, Kollam.

== Achievements ==
Year	Competition	Venue	Position	Event	Notes
Representing India
2000	Asian Championships	Jakarta, Indonesia	2nd	100 m	10.35
2005	National Circuit Athletics Meet	New Delhi, India	1st	100 m	10.30
