= Maurizio Checcucci =

Italian sprinter (born 1974)

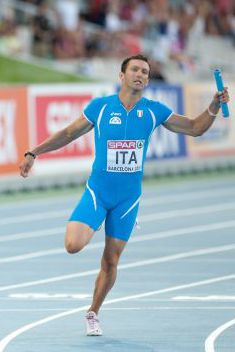
- Maurizio Checcucci, Barcelona 2010

Medal record

Representing Italy

Men's athletics

European Championships
| Silver medal – second place | 2010 Barcelona | 4 x 100 m relay |

Maurizio Checcucci (born 26 February 1974 in Florence) is an Italian sprinter who specializes in the 100 metres.

== Biography ==
He finished seventh in 4 x 100 metres relay at the 2000 Olympic Games, together with teammates Francesco Scuderi, Alessandro Cavallaro and Andrea Colombo. He also won the bronze medal in 200 metres at the 1993 European Junior Championships, and at the 2001 Mediterranean Games he won the silver medal in 100 metres and the gold medal in relay. He also competed at the 2002 European Championships and the 2006 European Championships without reaching the final. At 36 years old, he also competed at the 2010 European Championships, and won the silver medal in 4 × 100 m (38.17, NR) with Roberto Donati, Simone Collio and Emanuele Di Gregorio.

His personal best times were 6.76 seconds in the 60 metres, achieved in January 2004 in Modena; 10.27 seconds in the 100 metres, achieved in September 2001 in Rieti; and 20.81 seconds in the 200 metres, achieved in June 2001 in Brixen.

== Olympic results ==
| Year | Competition | Venue | Position | Event | Time | Notes |
|---|---|---|---|---|---|---|
| 2000 | Olympic Games | (Australia) Sydney | 7th | 4×100 metres | 38.67 | |

== See also ==
- Italy national relay team
