= Aham Okeke =

Nigerian-born Norwegian former sprinter (born 1969)

Personal information
- Born: 19 August 1969 (age 57) Nigeria

Sport
- Sport: Track and field

Aham Okeke (born 19 August 1969 in Nigeria) is a Nigerian-born Norwegian former sprinter, who represented the clubs IK Tjalve, IL i BUL and IF Hellas. He has won the 100 metres national championship six times. He set the national record on 100 metres five times, with a personal best of 10.26 seconds. His personal record in the 200 metres, also national record at the time, was 20.75 seconds.

Okeke competed at the 1987 European Junior Championships, the 1990 European Championships, the 1994 European Indoor Championships, the 2000 European Indoor Championships, the 2001 World Championships, the 2002 European Indoor Championships and the 2002 European Championships (interchangeably in the 60 metres, 100 metres, 200 metres or the 4x100 metres relay) without reaching the final round in any of the events.

Okeke tested positive for doping on two occasions in the 1990s, receiving bans of 1 month and 30 months respectively. In 2006, Okeke came out of retirement to qualify for the 2006 European Championships, when the Norwegian Anti-Doping Agency claimed a test taken on 20 July contained 20 times the highest allowed level of testosterone. He was given a lifetime ban from all sports.
