= Cláudio Roberto Souza =

Brazilian sprinter (born 1973)

Personal information
- Born: 14 October 1973 (age 53) Teresina, Piauí, Brazil

Sport
- Sport: Track and field
Medal record
Representing Brazil
Men's athletics
Olympic Games
Silver medal – second place	2000 Sydney	4x100 m relay
World Championships
Silver medal – second place	2003 Paris	4x100 m relay
Pan American Games
Gold medal – first place	2003 Santo Domingo	4x100 m relay

Cláudio Roberto Souza (born 14 October 1973) is a Brazilian sprinter who specialized in the 100 and 200 metres.

He was a part of the Brazilian relay team which won the silver medal in 4 × 100 m relay at the 2000 Summer Olympics in Sydney, running only in the heats.

Souza won a silver medal in 4 x 100 metres relay at the 2003 World Championships in Paris, together with teammates Vicente de Lima, Édson Ribeiro and André da Silva. The Brazilian relay team finished eighth at the 2004 Summer Olympics. In 100 metres Souza finished fifth at the 2001 Summer Universiade in Beijing.

His personal best times are 10.19 seconds over 100 m and 20.24 s over 200 m.
