= Slobodan Spasić =

Serbian sprinter

Personal information
- Nationality: Serbian
- Born: 16 May 1977 (age 49)

Sport
- Sport: Sprinting
- Event: 4 × 100 metres relay

Slobodan Spasić (born 16 May 1977) is a Serbian sprinter. He competed in the men's 4 × 100 metres relay at the 2000 Summer Olympics representing Yugoslavia.
