= John McAdorey =

Irish sprinter (1974–2019)

Personal information
- Nationality: Irish
- Born: 16 September 1974
- Died: 25 September 2019 (aged 45)

Sport
- Sport: Sprinting
- Event: 4 × 100 metres relay

John McAdorey (16 September 1974 – 25 September 2019) was an Irish sprinter. He competed in the men's 4 × 100 metres relay at the 2000 Summer Olympics.

== Biography ==
McAdorey was the Irish under-23 national champion in the 100m and the 200m in 1995 and 1996 respectively. In 2001, he also became the senior national champion in the 100m. In the men's 4 × 100 metres relay event at the 2000 Summer Olympics in Sydney, McAdorey was part of the Irish team that set a new national record. In 2002, he attempted to qualify for Northern Ireland's team for the 2002 Commonwealth Games in Manchester, but did not reach the standard needed. He later retired from the sport to become a coach.

McAdorey died in September 2019, at the age of 45, after being diagnosed with cancer.
