= Brian Lewis (sprinter) =

American athletics competitor

Personal information
- Born: December 5, 1974 (age 51) Sacramento, California, U.S.
- Height: 5 ft 8 in (173 cm)
- Weight: 158 lb (72 kg)

Sport
- Sport: Athletics (track and field)
- Events: 100 metres, 200 metres
- College team: Norfolk State
Medal record
Men's athletics
Representing the United States
Olympic Games
Gold medal – first place	2000 Sydney	4 × 100 m relay
World Championships
Gold medal – first place	1999 Sevilla	4 × 100 m relay

Brian M. Lewis (born December 5, 1974) is an American athlete, winner of gold medal in 4 × 100 m relay at the 2000 Summer Olympics.

Born in Sacramento, California, Brian Lewis played baseball (his father and uncle had played professional baseball) through his ninth grade, but moved then to athletics, because he did not want his father to coach him. Lewis graduated from Highlands High School in 1993.

Lewis was the member of American 4 × 100 m relay team, that did not finish its heat at the 1997 World Championships. At the 1998 Goodwill Games, Lewis was third in 100 m.

In 1999, Lewis won the US National Championships in 100 m and ran the third leg on the American 4 × 100 m relay team, which won the gold medal at the World Championships and also reached the semifinals of 100 m.

At the Sydney Olympics, Lewis ran the third leg on the gold medal-winning American 4 × 100 m relay team.
