= Yanes Raubaba =

Indonesian sprinter

Personal information
- Nationality: Indonesian
- Born: 24 April 1974 (age 52) Biak Numfor, Indonesia

Sport
- Sport: Sprinting
- Event: 100 metres

Yanes Raubaba (born 24 April 1974) is an Indonesian sprinter. He competed in the men's 100 metres at the 2000 Summer Olympics.
