= Barnabe Jolicoeur =

Mauritian sprinter (born 1966)

Barnabe Jolicoeur (born 1 September 1966) is a Mauritian former sprinter who competed in the men's 100m competition at the 1996 Summer Olympics. He recorded a 10.57, not enough to qualify for the next round past the heats. His personal best is 10.52, set in 1996. He also ran for the Mauritian 4 × 100 m relay team, which finished 7th in its heat at 40.92.
