= Gavin Hunter =

British racehorse trainer (1941–2022)

Gavin Hunter (1941 – 18 December 2022) was a British horse trainer who trained horses which competed in Flat racing.

Hunter's training career lasted from 1965 to 1985. He was based at stables at East Ilsley and after retiring from training he moved to South Africa where he worked as a horse racing steward. He died at Newmarket in December 2022. The best horse he trained was Shangamuzo, who won the Doncaster Cup while trained by Hunter.

Hunter died on 18 December 2022 in Newmarket, Suffolk, at the age of 81.
