= William To =

Hong Kong athlete

Personal information
- Nationality: Hong Konger
- Born: 7 August 1979 (age 46)

Sport
- Sport: Sprinting
- Event: 4 × 100 metres relay
Medal record
Men's athletics
Representing Hong Kong
Asian Indoor Championships
| Silver medal – second place | 2004 Tehran | 60 m |

William To (born 7 August 1979) is a Hong Kong sprinter. He competed in the men's 4 × 100 metres relay at the 2000 Summer Olympics.
