= Tim Göbel =

German sprinter

Tim Göbel (born 4 March 1982) is a German sprinter who specialized in the 100 metres.

He won the silver medal at the 2001 European Junior Championships. In 60 metres he finished sixth at the 2001 World Indoor Championships in Lisbon and seventh at the 2005 European Indoor Athletics Championships in Madrid.

His personal best time over 100 m is 10.21 seconds, achieved in June 2001 in Stuttgart. This is only 0.01 second behind Sören Schlegel, who occupies the tenth place on the German all-time list.

Tim Göbel represented the sports team ASV Köln and became German champion in 2001.
