= Oscar Meneses (athlete) =

Guatemalan sprinter

Personal information
- Nationality: Guatemalan
- Born: 12 May 1977 (age 49)

Sport
- Sport: Sprinting
- Event: 100 metres

Oscar D. Meneses González (born 12 May 1977) is a Guatemalan sprinter. He competed in the men's 100 metres at the 2000 Summer Olympics.
