= Georgios Theodoridis (sprinter) =

Greek sprinter

Personal information
- Born: December 12, 1972 (age 53) Athens, Greece

Sport
- Sport: Track and field
Medal record
Representing Greece
World Indoor Championships
Bronze medal – third place	2004 Budapest	60 m
European Indoor Championships
Silver medal – second place	2000 Ghent	60 m

Georgios Theodoridis (Greek: Γεώργιος Θεοδωρίδης, born December 12, 1972) is a Greek sprinter specializing in the 60 metres and 100 metres.

Born in Athens and raised in Kozani, he finished sixth at the 1998 European Indoor Championships, won the silver medal at the 2000 European Indoor Championships, finished seventh at the 2001 World Indoor Championships and won the bronze medal in at the 2004 World Indoor Championships. He also competed at the Olympic Games in 2000 and 2004, the World Championships in 1999 and 2003 and the World Indoor Championships in 1999 World Indoor Championships and 2003 World Indoor Championships without reaching the final round.

His personal best at 60 metres is 6.51 seconds, achieved at the 2000 European Indoor Championships in Ghent. His personal best in 100 metres is 10.17 seconds, achieved during the 2003 World Championships in Paris. This time ranks him eighth among Greek 100 metres sprinters.

== Honours ==
Year	Competition	Venue	Position	Event	Notes
1998	European Indoor Championships	Valencia, Spain	6th	60 m	6.68
1999	World Indoor Championships	Maebashi, Japan	9th (sf)	60 m	
2000	European Indoor Championships	Ghent, Belgium	2nd	60 m	6.51 PB
2000	Olympic Games	Sydney, Australia	9th (sf)	4 × 100 m relay	38.80
2001	World Indoor Championships	Lisbon, Portugal	7th	60 m	
2002	European Championships	Munich, Germany	final	100 m	DQ
2003	World Indoor Championships	Birmingham, United Kingdom	13th (sf)	60 m	
2003	World Championships	Paris, France	17th (h)	100 m	10.25
2004	World Indoor Championships	Budapest, Hungary	3rd	60 m	6.54 SB
2004	Olympic Games	Athens, Greece	34th (h)	100 m	10.36
