= Urban Acman =

Slovenian sprinter

Personal information
- Nationality: Slovenian
- Born: 28 March 1976 (age 50) Celje, Yugoslavia

Sport
- Sport: Sprinting
- Events: 100m, 200m, 4 × 100 metres relay

Urban Acman (born 28 March 1976) is a retired Slovenian sprinter. He competed in the men's 4 × 100 metres relay at the 2000 Summer Olympics.

== Personal bests ==
Event	Time (sec)	Venue	Date
50 metres	5.83	Eaubonne, France	23 Feb 1999
60 metres	6.67	Munich, Germany	10 Feb 2001
100 metres	10.21	Maribor, Slovenia	01 Aug 1998
200 metres	20.81	Maribor, Slovenia	02 Aug 1998

- All information taken from the athlete's World Athletics profile.
