= Erwin Heru Susanto =

Indonesian sprinter

Personal information
- Nationality: Indonesian
- Born: 24 June 1974 (age 52)

Sport
- Sport: Sprinting
- Event: 100 metres

Erwin Heru Susanto (born 24 June 1974) is an Indonesian sprinter. He competed in the men's 100 metres at the 2000 Summer Olympics.
