= Issa-Aimé Nthépé =

French sprinter

Medal record

Men's athletics

Representing Cameroon

African Championships
Bronze medal – third place	1996 Yaoundé	4×100 m

Issa-Aimé Nthépé (born 26 June 1973 in Douala) is a French sprinter who specializes in the 100 metres. He switched nationality from his birth country Cameroon in 1999.

At the 2002 European Championships he finished fifth in the 100 metres and fourth in 4 x 100 metres relay. He reached the quarterfinals of the 2003 World Championships. He finished seventh with the French relay team at the 2006 IAAF World Cup.

His personal best times are 10.11 seconds in the 100 m and 20.58 seconds in the 200 m, both achieved in the summer of 2002.
