= Francesco Scuderi (athlete) =

Italian sprinter

Personal information
- Nationality: Italian
- Born: 4 October 1977 (age 49) Catania, Italy
- Height: 1.81 m (5 ft 11 1/2 in)
- Weight: 70 kg (154 lb)

Sport
- Country: Italy
- Sport: Athletics
- Event: Sprint
- Club: G.S. Fiamme Azzurre

Achievements and titles
- Personal bests: 60 m indoor: 6.60 (1998); 100 m: 10.19 (2000); 200 m: 20.66 (2006)
Medal record
Event	1st	2nd	3rd
Mediterranean Games	1	0	0
European Cup	2	1	1
Military World Games	1	0	0
World Junior Championships	0	0	1
Total	4	1	2
Mediterranean Games
Gold medal – first place	2001 Tunis	4x400 m relay
World Junior Championships
Bronze medal – third place	1996 Sydney	100 m

Francesco Scuderi (born 4 October 1977) is an Italian sprinter who specialized in the 100 metres.

== Biography ==
He finished seventh in 4 x 100 metres relay at the 2000 Olympic Games, together with teammates Francesco Scuderi, Alessandro Cavallaro, Maurizio Checcucci and Andrea Colombo. He also won the bronze medal at the 1996 World Junior Championships and finished fifth at the 2002 European Indoor Championships, both in the individual distance. At the 2001 Mediterranean Games, he won a gold medal in relay. He also competed at the 2001 World Championships and the 2002 European Championships without reaching the final.

His personal best times were 6.60 seconds in the 60 metres, achieved in the heats of the 1998 European Indoor Championships in Valencia; 10.19 seconds in the 100 metres, achieved in September 2000 in Milan; and 20.66 seconds in the 200 metres, achieved in June 2006 in Palermo.

He contracted Bechet Syndrome in 2003 and could not compete for two years due to the seriousness of the condition. He recovered and managed to gain selection for the 2006 European Athletics Indoor Cup.

== Olympic results ==
Year	Competition	Venue	Position	Event	Time	Notes
2000	Olympic Games	(Australia) Sydney	7th	4×100 metres	38.67	

== National titles ==
He won 8 national championships at individual senior level.

- Italian Athletics Championships
  - 100 metres: 1998, 2000, 2001, 2002, 2003
- Italian Indoor Athletics Championships
  - 60 metres: 1998, 2001, 2002, 2006

== See also ==
- Italian all-time lists - 100 metres
- Italy national relay team
