= Luis Alberto Pérez-Rionda =

Cuban sprinter (born 1969)

Personal information
- Born: August 16, 1969 (age 57) Matanzas, Cuba
Medal record
Men's Athletics
Representing Cuba
Olympic Games
Bronze medal – third place	2000 Sydney	4x100m relay
Central American and Caribbean Games
Gold medal – first place	1998 Maracaibo	4x100m relay
Silver medal – second place	1998 Maracaibo	100m
Summer Universiade
Silver medal – second place	1997 Catania	4x100m relay

Luis Alberto Pérez-Rionda (born August 16, 1969) is a former sprinter from Cuba who won an Olympic bronze medal in the 4 x 100 metres relay in 2000 Summer Olympics. His personal best of 10.18 (100 metres) was set in 1997.
