= Aziz Zakari =

Ghanaian sprinter (born 1976)

Personal information
- Born: 2 September 1976 (age 49) Accra, Ghana
- Height: 1.71 m (5 ft 7 in)
- Weight: 68 kg (150 lb)

Sport
- Country: Ghana
- Sport: Track and field
- Event(s): 100m, 200m 4 x 100m relay

Achievements and titles
- Personal best(s): 60m 6.63s 100m: 9.99s 200m 20.23s
Medal record
Men's athletics
Representing Ghana
African Championships
Gold medal – first place	2000 Algiers	100 m
Gold medal – first place	2000 Algiers	200 m
Gold medal – first place	2000 Algiers	4x100 m
Silver medal – second place	2002 Radès	200 m
Silver medal – second place	2010 Nairobi	100 m
Bronze medal – third place	2010 Nairobi	4×100 m
World Athletics Final
Silver medal – second place	2005 Monaco	100 m
Bronze medal – third place	2004 Monaco	100 m

Abdul Aziz Zakari (born September 2, 1976) is a Ghanaian athlete specializing in the 100 metres. He was born in Accra, Ghana.

Participating in the 2000 Summer Olympics, he made it to the final of the 100 metres, but failed to finish after becoming injured at about the 35m mark.

Also participating in the 2004 Summer Olympics, he achieved second place in his 100 metres heat, thus making it through to the second round. Heading into the second round, he was victorious in a tough sprint, before achieving qualification from his semi-final. This good form was not able to continue, as he failed to finish in the final, staged on August 22, renowned as possibly the fastest collective 100 metre race in history, where six of the seven finishing athletes completed the race in ten seconds or less.

He finally, for the first time, achieved a sub-10 second run on June 14, 2005, in Athens when he ran 9.99 seconds in Asafa Powell's world record breaking race. The Ghanaian record currently belongs to Leonard Myles-Mills with 9.98 seconds.

In July 2006, Zakari was reported to have failed a drugs test for the banned substance stanozolol. The test was conducted In-Competition on 29 April 2006 at the IAAF Grand Prix Meeting in Dakar. On 25 September 2006 the IAAF suspended him for two years. After his suspension Zakari participated at the 2008 Summer Olympics in which he ran the fourth time in his 100 metres heat, behind Richard Thompson, Martial Mbandjock and Simone Collio. His time of 10.34 was the third losing time after the 10.25 of Nobuharu Asahara, advancing him to the second round. There he improved his time to 10.24, but finished in fifth place of his heat, causing his elimination from the competition.

== Personal bests ==
=== Outdoor ===
Distance	Time	Wind	Location / Date
100 m	9.99 s	+ 0.5 m/s	Rieti / 28 August 2005
200 m	20.23 s	+ 0.2 m/s	Algiers / 14 July 2000

=== Indoor ===
Distance	Time	Location / Date
60 m	6.63 s	Boston / 1 February 2003

== See also ==
- List of sportspeople sanctioned for doping offences
