= Bradley McCuaig =

Canadian sprinter

Personal information
- Born: 12 December 1970 (age 55) Calgary, Alberta, Canada

Sport
- Sport: Track and field
Medal record
Representing Canada
Commonwealth Games
Silver medal – second place	1998 Kuala Lumpur	4x100m relay
Pan American Games
Silver medal – second place	1999 Winnipeg	4x100m relay

Bradley "Brad" McCuaig (born 12 December 1970) is a Canadian retired sprinter who specialized in the 100 metres.

Representing the Alabama Crimson Tide track and field team, McCuaig won the 1990 NCAA Division I Outdoor Track and Field Championships in the 4 × 100 m relay.

In the 4 × 100 metres relay event he finished fourth at the 1998 IAAF World Cup and won a silver medal at the 1999 Pan American Games.

His personal best time is 10.10 seconds, achieved in July 1998 in Flagstaff.

McCuaig competed at the 2000 Summer Olympics in the men's 4 × 100 m relay.
