= Benjamin Sirimou =

Cameroonian sprinter

Medal record

Men's athletics

African Championships
Silver medal – second place	1996 Yaoundé	100 m
Bronze medal – third place	1996 Yaoundé	4×100 m
Bronze medal – third place	1998 Dakar	4×100 m

Benjamin Sirimou (born 29 May 1969) is a Cameroonian sprinter.

At the 1996 African Championships he won the silver medals in the 100 metres. He also competed at the World Championships in 1995 and 1997, as well as in 4 × 100 m relay at the 1996 and 2000 Summer Olympics without reaching the final.
