= Glenroy Gilbert =

Canadian track and field athlete

Personal information
- Born: August 31, 1968 (age 58) Port of Spain, Trinidad and Tobago
- Education: Louisiana State University
- Height: 183 cm (6 ft 0 in)
- Weight: 93 kg (205 lb; 14 st 9 lb)

Sport
- Sport: Track and field; Bobsleigh
- Events: 100 m, Long jump
- University team: LSU Tigers
- Retired: 2000

Achievements and titles
- Personal bests: 100 m: 10.10 (Victoria 1994); 200 m: 20.37 (New Orleans 1993); Long jump: 8.04 (Bogota 1989)
Medal record
Men's track and field
Representing Canada
Olympic Games
Gold medal – first place	1996 Atlanta	4 × 100 m relay
World Championships
Gold medal – first place	1995 Gothenburg	4 × 100 m relay
Gold medal – first place	1997 Athens	4 × 100 m relay
Bronze medal – third place	1993 Stuttgart	4 × 100 m relay
Pan American Games
Gold medal – first place	1995 Mar del Plata	100 m
Summer Universiade
Bronze medal – third place	1993 Buffalo	100 m

Glenroy John Gilbert (born August 31, 1968) is a Canadian former track and field athlete, winner of the gold medal in 4 × 100 metres relay at the 1996 Summer Olympics, and head coach of Athletics Canada.

== Athletics career ==
Born in Trinidad and Tobago, Gilbert, his mother, and his five siblings, moved to Canada in 1973.

He was a member of the Louisiana State University track and field team, where he won the NCAA 4 × 100 metres relay title in 1993.

Gilbert made his major international championships debut at the 1988 Summer Olympics, where he was 21st in the Long Jump. At the 1990 Commonwealth Games, Gilbert was eighth in long jump, and reached the semifinal as a member of Canada's 4 × 100 m relay team at the 1992 Summer Olympics.

Gilbert won his first medal at the 1993 World Championships, when the Canadian 4 × 100 m relay team finished in third place. At the 1994 Commonwealth Games, Gilbert won the gold medal in 4 × 100 m relay and was fifth in 100 m. Gilbert also competed in bobsleigh at 1994 Winter Olympics, where he finished fifteenth in two-man bobsled and eleventh in four-man bobsled.

In 1995, Gilbert won a gold medal in 100 m at the Pan-American Games and was a member of gold medal-winning Canadian 4 × 100 m relay team at the 1995 World Championships.

At the Atlanta Olympics, At the 4 × 100 m relay final, the Canadian team beat United States by almost half a second, to establish itself the best relay team in the world. Gilbert also reached the quarterfinals of the 100 m.

Gilbert and the Canadian team won a gold medal again at the 1997 World Championships and at the 1998 Goodwill Games. At the 1999 World Championships the Canadian team were disqualified in semifinal and Gilbert ended his running career after the 2000 Summer Olympics, where the Canadians were eliminated in the semifinal.

== Post-athletics career ==
After his retirement, Gilbert worked for a short time in CBC radio in Ottawa. He became coach for the Ottawa Lions Track & Field club, coaching sprints and relays. He has worked with Athletics Canada since 2006, primarily as coach of the Canadian men's and women's relay teams.

In July 2017 he was named Athletics Canada's permanent head coach; he had earlier been named head coach for the August 2017 world track and field championships.

== Honours ==
In 2008 he was inducted into Canada's Sports Hall of Fame as part of the 1996 Summer Olympics 4 × 100 relay team.
