= Watson Nyambek =

Malaysian sprinter

Personal information
- Nationality: Malaysian
- Born: 25 February 1976 (age 50) Miri, Sarawak
- Height: 5 ft 7 in (1.70 m)
- Weight: 159 lb (72 kg)

Sport
- Sport: Running
- Event: 100 meters

Achievements and titles
- Personal best: 100m: 10.30 s
Medal record
Men's athletics
Representing Malaysia
Asian Championships
| Silver medal – second place | 1998 Fukuoka | 100 m |

Watson Nyambek (born 27 February 1976) from Miri, Sarawak is a Malaysian sprinter. He obtained his secondary education at SMK St. Columba. Nyambek, under the tutelage of Canadian coach Daniel St Hilaire, had shot to fame in 1996 during the Malaysia Games, beating reigning 100m sprinter Azmi Ibrahim in the final. Nyambek astonished everyone by clocking 10.38 seconds, eclipsing the national record set by M Jegathesan (10.46 seconds, set during the Asian Games in 1966). Two years later, Nyambek lowered this record to 10.30 seconds.

== Achievements ==
=== Personal bests ===
| Event | Time (seconds) | Venue | Date | Meet | Ref |
|---|---|---|---|---|---|
| 50 m (Indoor) | 5.84 | Eaubonne, France | 2 February 1999 | | |
| 60 m (Indoor) | 6.66 | Maebashi, Japan | 7 March 1999 | World Championships | |
| 100 m | 10.30 & 10.0 ht | Kuala Lumpur, Malaysia & Hanoi, Vietnam | 13 July 1998 & 1998 | | |

== Honours ==
- Sarawak
  - Gold Medal of the Sarawak Independence Diamond Jubilee Medal (2023)
