= Chiang Wai Hung =

Hong Kong sprinter (born 1976)

Personal information
- Nationality: Hong Konger
- Born: 15 April 1976 (age 49)

Sport
- Sport: Sprinting
- Event: 100 metres

Chiang Wai Hung (Chinese: 蔣偉洪; born 15 April 1976) is a Hong Kong sprinter. He competed in the 100 metres at the 2000 Summer Olympics and the 2004 Summer Olympics.
