= Serge Bengono =

Cameroonian sprinter

Medal record

Men's athletics

Representing Cameroon

African Championships
Bronze medal – third place	1998 Dakar	4×100 m

Serge Bengono (born 3 August 1977) is a Cameroonian sprinter who specializes in the 100 metres.

== Career ==
He competed at the 2000 Summer Olympics and the World Championships in 2001 and 2003 without reaching the final.

Bengono competed for the George Mason Patriots track and field team in the NCAA.

His personal best times are 10.25 seconds in the 100 metres, achieved at the 1999 All-Africa Games in Johannesburg; and 20.89 seconds in the 200 metres, achieved in April 2002 in Knoxville. He is also a national record holder in the 4 x 100 metres relay, achieved at the 1999 World Championships. In relay he also competed at the 1997 World Championships.

Serge Bengono is currently an assistant track coach at Norfolk State University.
