= Édson Ribeiro =

Brazilian sprinter (born 1972)

Personal information
- Born: December 8, 1972 (age 53) Bandeirantes, Paraná, Brazil

Sport
- Sport: Track and field
Medal record
Men's Athletics
Representing Brazil
Olympic Games
Silver medal – second place	2000 Sydney	4×100 m relay
Bronze medal – third place	1996 Atlanta	4×100 m relay
World Championships
Silver medal – second place	2003 Paris	4×100 m relay
Bronze medal – third place	1999 Sevilla	4×100 m relay
Pan American Games
Gold medal – first place	1999 Winnipeg	4×100 m relay
Gold medal – first place	2003 Santo Domingo	4×100 m relay

Édson Luciano Ribeiro (born December 8, 1972) is a Brazilian sprinter competing mostly in 100 metres. He has been successful on regional level, and won two Olympic medals with the Brazilian 4 x 100 metres relay team.

His personal best time achieved in 1998, is 10.14 seconds.

== Achievements ==
(100 metres unless noted)

- 2003 South American Championships - gold medal
- 2003 World Championships in Athletics - silver medal (4×100 metres relay)
- 2000 Olympic Games - silver medal (4×100 metres relay)
- 1999 South American Championships - gold medal (200 metres)
- 1999 World Championships in Athletics - bronze medal (4×100 metres relay)
- 1996 Olympic Games - bronze medal (4×100 metres relay)
- 1995 South American Championships - silver medal
