= Freddy Mayola =

Cuban sprinter (born 1977)

Personal information
- Born: November 1, 1977 (age 48) Havana, Cuba
Medal record
Men's Athletics
Representing Cuba
Olympic Games
Bronze medal – third place	2000 Sydney	4×100 m relay
Pan American Games
Silver medal – second place	1999 Winnipeg	100 m

Freddy Santiago Mayola Fernández (Spanish pronunciation: [ˈfɾeði maˈʝola]; born November 1, 1977) is a Cuban sprinter who won an Olympic bronze medal in 4 × 100 metres relay at the 2000 Summer Olympics. He also shared in relay silver medals at the 2002 IAAF World Cup and 2000 Ibero-American Championships in Athletics.

He represented his country twice over the 100 m at the World Championships in Athletics, competing in 1999 and 2001.

His run of 6.55 seconds for the 60 metres was the best time by any athlete in 2006. His overall personal best for that event, 6.49 seconds, is the Cuban record.

His best individual results include a 100 m silver medal at the 1999 Pan American Games and a fourth place in 60 metres at the 2001 IAAF World Indoor Championships. He is ranked equal fourth on the all-time 50 metres lists with his best of 5.61 seconds.

== Personal bests ==
- 100 metres - 10.10 (1999)
- 200 metres - 20.99 (2004)
- 60 metres - 6.49 (2000)
