= Leonard Myles-Mills =

Ghanaian sprinter (born 1973)

Personal information
- Nationality: Ghanaian
- Born: 9 May 1973 (age 53) Accra, Ghana
- Height: 1.75 m (5 ft 9 in)
- Weight: 70 kg (11 st 0 lb; 154 lb)

Sport
- Country: Ghana
- Sport: Track and field
- College team: BYU Cougars

Achievements and titles
- Personal best(s): 100 m: 9.98 sec (1999); 200 m: 20.54 sec (1998)
Medal record
Men's athletics
Representing Ghana
All-Africa Games
Gold medal – first place	1999 Johannesburg	100 m
Bronze medal – third place	2003 Abuja	100 m
African Championships
Bronze medal – third place	1998 Dakar	100 m

Leonard ("Leo") Myles-Mills (born 9 May 1973 in Accra, Greater Accra Region) is a Ghanaian former athlete who specialized in the 100 metres. He ran a personal best of 9.98 seconds for the event in 1998, becoming the first Ghanaian to break the 10-second barrier. His best of 6.45 seconds for the 60 metres is an African record. Myles-Mills twice represented his country at the Summer Olympics and also at the Commonwealth Games. He was a two-time NCAA Men's 100 m dash champion while running for Brigham Young University.

His brother John Myles-Mills was also a sprint athlete.

He has won a gold medal at the 1999 All-Africa Games, a silver medal at the 2003 All-Africa Games and a bronze medal at the 1998 African Championships. In 1999 he set a new African indoor record in 60 metres with 6.45 seconds. His personal best over 100 metres; 9.98 seconds was a Ghanaian record until Benjamin Azamati broke it by running a time of 9.97 seconds in 100 meters at the Texas relays on 26 March 2021.

Participating in the 2004 Summer Olympics, he achieved a third place in the 100 metres, thus securing qualification from his heat in a season's best time. Entering the second round, he managed to qualify through to the semi-final, following a third place in the race and recording a further improvement upon his season's best. He finished the semi-final in sixth place, thus failing to secure qualification to the final.

Myles-Mills is a member of the Church of Jesus Christ of Latter-day Saints.

== International competitions ==
Year	Competition	Venue	Position	Event	Notes
1999	All-Africa Games	Johannesburg, South Africa	1st	100 m	9.99 s
2003	All-Africa Games	Abuja, Nigeria	3rd	100 m	10.03 s

== See also ==
- List of Brigham Young University alumni
