= 1994 World Junior Championships in Athletics – Men's 4 × 100 metres relay =

The men's 4×100 metres relay event at the 1994 World Junior Championships in Athletics was held in Lisbon, Portugal, at Estádio Universitário de Lisboa on 23 and 24 July.

== Medalists ==
Gold	Jason Gardener; Julian Golding; Ian Mackie; Trevor Cameron; United Kingdom
Silver	Deworski Odom; Tony Wheeler; Pat Johnson; Toya Jones; United States
Bronze	Carlton Chambers; Dave Tomlin; Chris Robinson; Eric Frempong-Manso; Canada

== Results ==
=== Final ===
24 July

Rank	Nation	Competitors	Time	Notes
1st place, gold medalist(s)	United Kingdom	Jason Gardener; Julian Golding; Ian Mackie; Trevor Cameron	39.60	
2nd place, silver medalist(s)	United States	Deworski Odom; Tony Wheeler; Pat Johnson; Toya Jones	39.76	
3rd place, bronze medalist(s)	Canada	Carlton Chambers; Dave Tomlin; Chris Robinson; Eric Frempong-Manso	39.90	
4	Japan	Atsuo Narita; Masato Ebiwasa; Yoshihiro Arima; Tadashi Imori	40.03	
5	France	Joann Baetz; David Patros; Loic Rubio; Sébastien Jamain	40.38	
6	Germany	Uwe Eisenbeis; Marc-Oliver Schmidtchen; Ulysses Hammelstein; Frank Busemann	40.45	
7	Jamaica	Christopher Brooks; Elston Cawley; Christopher Butler; Bernard Burrell	40.72	
8	Norway	Bård Venholen; Helge Farbrot; Erlend Saeterstol; John Ertzgaard	41.79	

=== Heats ===
23 July

==== Heat 1 ====
Rank	Nation	Competitors	Time	Notes
1	France	Joann Baetz; David Patros; Loic Rubio; Sébastien Jamain	40.40	Q
2	Jamaica	Christopher Brooks; Wayne Johnson; Christopher Butler; Bernard Burrell	40.46	Q
3	Australia	Gavin Hunter; Chris Shute; James Goodwin; David Thom	41.04	
4	South Africa	Etienne Roux; Dirk Pretorius; Rudolph Louw; Liod Kgopong	41.07	
5	Greece	Yeóryios Abatzopoulos; Ángelos Pavlakákis; Hristóforos Hoídis; Pródromos Korkízoglu	41.09	
6	Ukraine	Dmitriy Myshka; Vitaly Seniv; Bogdan Zamostyanyuk; Aleksander Streltsov	41.46	
	New Zealand	Todd Blythe; Mark Keddell; Chris Donaldson; Matthew Coad	DQ	
	Sweden	Fredrik Persson; Conny Malm; Per Svenström; Magnus Hemström	DQ	

==== Heat 2 ====
Rank	Nation	Competitors	Time	Notes
1	Canada	Carlton Chambers; Dave Tomlin; Chris Robinson; Eric Frempong-Manso	40.04	Q
2	Germany	Uwe Eisenbeis; Marc-Oliver Schmidtchen; Ulysses Hammelstein; Frank Busemann	40.17	Q
3	Japan	Tatsuiko Watanabe; Masato Ebiwasa; Yoshihiro Arima; Tadashi Imori	40.35	q
4	Norway	Bård Venholen; Helge Farbrot; Erlend Saeterstol; John Ertzgaard	40.99	q
5	Portugal	Alexandre Cruz; Tiny Kiluange; Ricardo Santos; Manuel Aráujo	41.64	
6	Nigeria	Sylvester Omodiale; Wilson Ogbeide; Francis Obikwelu; Deji Aliu	41.84	
	Ireland	John Whelan; Stuart McQuade; Kevin Cogley; Ciaran McDonagh	DNF	

==== Heat 3 ====
Rank	Nation	Competitors	Time	Notes
1	United Kingdom	Jason Gardener; Marlon Devonish; Kevin Mark; Trevor Cameron	39.92	Q
2	United States	Deworski Odom; Tony Wheeler; Pat Johnson; Toya Jones	39.95	Q
3	Algeria	Fethi Jedai; Amine Harchouche; Toufik Sekat; Yacine Djellil	41.87	
4	Slovakia	Matej Méhes; Andrej Benda; Robert Jarabek; Áron Szmuda	42.26	
	Cuba	Pavel Benet; Anier García; Georkis Vera; Yoel Hernández	DQ	
	Spain	Luis Sabeter; Venancio José; Unai Landa; Eduardo Ugarte	DQ	
	Chinese Taipei	Huang Jong-Jin; Huang Hsin-Ping; Lin Jui-Hsin; Chen Tzu-Lung	DQ	

== Participation ==
According to an unofficial count, 92 athletes from 22 countries participated in the event.

- Algeria (4)
- Australia (4)
- Canada (4)
- Chinese Taipei (4)
- Cuba (4)
- France (4)
- Germany (4)
- Greece (4)
- Ireland (4)
- Jamaica (5)
- Japan (5)
- New Zealand (4)
- Nigeria (4)
- Norway (4)
- Portugal (4)
- Slovakia (4)
- South Africa (4)
- Spain (4)
- Sweden (4)
- Ukraine (4)
- United Kingdom (6)
- United States (4)
