= 1994 World Junior Championships in Athletics – Men's 4 × 400 metres relay =

The men's 4x400 metres relay event at the 1994 World Junior Championships in Athletics was held in Lisbon, Portugal, at Estádio Universitário de Lisboa on 23 and 24 July.

== Medalists ==
Gold	Desmond Johnson; Tony Wheeler; Milton Campbell; Ramon Clay; United States
Silver	Rohan McDonald; Davian Clarke; Mario Watts; Michael McDonald; Jamaica
Bronze	Guy Bullock; Nick Budden; Noel Levy; Mark Hylton; United Kingdom

== Results ==
=== Final ===
24 July

Rank	Nation	Competitors	Time	Notes
1st place, gold medalist(s)	United States	Desmond Johnson; Tony Wheeler; Milton Campbell; Ramon Clay	3:03.32	
2nd place, silver medalist(s)	Jamaica	Rohan McDonald; Davian Clarke; Mario Watts; Michael McDonald	3:04.12	
3rd place, bronze medalist(s)	United Kingdom	Guy Bullock; Nick Budden; Noel Levy; Mark Hylton	3:06.59	
4	New Zealand	Zion Armstrong; Mark Keddell; Chris Donaldson; Shaun Farrell	3:07.25	
5	Japan	Mitsumasa Hattori; Hidehiko Tsukada; Kentaro Okumura; Shoji Taga	3:08.06	
6	Germany	Marco Krause; Ulrich Schnorrenberger; Jörg Regenaermel; Marco Seidler	3:08.77	
7	Nigeria	Kunle Adejuyigbe; Sylvester Omodiale; Wilson Ogbeide; Francis Obikwelu	3:09.68	
8	Cuba	Georkis Vera; Yosvany González; Pavel Benet; Alain Miranda	3:10.30	

=== Heats ===
23 July

==== Heat 1 ====
Rank	Nation	Competitors	Time	Notes
1	United Kingdom	Jared Deacon; Nick Budden; Noel Levy; Mark Hylton	3:10.96	Q
2	Nigeria	Kunle Adejuyigbe; Sylvester Omodiale; Wilson Ogbeide; Francis Obikwelu	3:11.24	Q
3	Greece	Thomás Iakovákis; Panayiótis Sarrís; Panayiótis Mandelidis; Yeóryios Batsikas	3:12.51	
	Algeria	Amine Harchouche; Yacine Djellil; Mohamed-Lami Naamane; Adem Hecini	DQ	
	Kenya	Peter Biwott; Japheth Kimutai; Nixon Rotich; Kiprotich Chemase	DQ	
	Saudi Arabia	Khalid Skayel; Hadi Al-Somaily; Saleh Al-Saidan; Mohamed Al-Bishi	DQ	

==== Heat 2 ====
Rank	Nation	Competitors	Time	Notes
1	Germany	Ulrich Schnorrenberger; Marco Seidler; Jörg Regenaermel; Marco Krause	3:09.55	Q
2	New Zealand	Zion Armstrong; Shaun Farrell; Matthew Coad; Chris Donaldson	3:10.10	Q
3	Cuba	Georkis Vera; Yosvany González; Pavel Benet; Alain Miranda	3:10.43	q
4	France	Robert Loubli; Pascal Lucea; Michael Saticouche; Xavier Ravenet	3:11.36	
5	Portugal	Rafael Queiros; Rui Costa; Pedro Marques; Duarte Basilio	3:15.56	
	Finland	Hans Nordman; Tommi Hartonen; Mats Lönnqvist; Petri Pohjonen	DQ	

==== Heat 3 ====
Rank	Nation	Competitors	Time	Notes
1	Jamaica	Lorenzo Robinson; Davian Clarke; Mario Watts; Michael McDonald	3:06.44	Q
2	United States	Desmond Johnson; Milton Campbell; Tyrell Harrison; Ramon Clay	3:07.65	Q
3	Japan	Mitsumasa Hattori; Hidehiko Tsukada; Kentaro Okumura; Shoji Taga	3:10.46	q
4	South Africa	Liod Kgopong; Moses Mabaso; Dirk Pretorius; Riaan Dempers	3:12.29	
5	Australia	Kieran Gallagher; Simon Travis; Matthew Beckenham; Paul Byrne	3:12.39	
6	Italy	Alessandro Bracciali; Emiliano Bertuzzi; Matteo Marcelli; Walter Pirovano	3:15.50	

== Participation ==
According to an unofficial count, 76 athletes from 18 countries participated in the event.

- Algeria (4)
- Australia (4)
- Cuba (4)
- Finland (4)
- France (4)
- Germany (4)
- Greece (4)
- Italy (4)
- Jamaica (5)
- Japan (4)
- Kenya (4)
- New Zealand (5)
- Nigeria (4)
- Portugal (4)
- Saudi Arabia (4)
- South Africa (4)
- United Kingdom (5)
- United States (5)
