= 1994 World Junior Championships in Athletics – Men's 200 metres =

The men's 200 metres event at the 1994 World Junior Championships in Athletics was held in Lisbon, Portugal, at Estádio Universitário de Lisboa on 22 and 23 July.

== Medalists ==
Gold	Tony Wheeler; United States
Silver	Deji Aliu; Nigeria
Bronze	Ian Mackie; United Kingdom

== Results ==
=== Final ===
23 July
Wind: +1.7 m/s

Rank	Name	Nationality	Time	Notes
1st place, gold medalist(s)	Tony Wheeler	United States	20.62	
2nd place, silver medalist(s)	Deji Aliu	Nigeria	20.88	
3rd place, bronze medalist(s)	Ian Mackie	United Kingdom	20.95	
4	Eric Frempong-Manso	Canada	21.01	
5	Mark Keddell	New Zealand	21.02	
6	Han Chaoming	China	21.08	
7	Ibrahim Meité	Côte d'Ivoire	21.24	
8	Bryan Howard	United States	21.25	

=== Semifinals ===
23 July

==== Semifinal 1 ====
Wind: +1.9 m/s

Rank	Name	Nationality	Time	Notes
1	Ian Mackie	United Kingdom	20.91	Q
2	Deji Aliu	Nigeria	21.01	Q
3	Mark Keddell	New Zealand	21.10	Q
4	Bryan Howard	United States	21.11	Q
5	Obadele Thompson	Barbados	21.28	
6	Yoshihiro Arima	Japan	21.35	
7	Rudolph Louw	South Africa	21.44	
8	Unai Landa	Spain	21.56	

==== Semifinal 2 ====
Wind: +1.9 m/s

Rank	Name	Nationality	Time	Notes
1	Tony Wheeler	United States	20.75	Q
2	Eric Frempong-Manso	Canada	21.08	Q
3	Ibrahim Meité	Côte d'Ivoire	21.17	Q
4	Han Chaoming	China	21.18	Q
5	Julian Golding	United Kingdom	21.21	
6	Venancio José	Spain	21.40	
7	Todd Blythe	New Zealand	21.57	
8	Markus Lindahl	Finland	21.61	

=== Quarterfinals ===
22 July

==== Quarterfinal 1 ====
Wind: +0.6 m/s

Rank	Name	Nationality	Time	Notes
1	Tony Wheeler	United States	20.69	Q
2	Han Chaoming	China	21.05	Q
3	Rudolph Louw	South Africa	21.29	Q
4	Todd Blythe	New Zealand	21.33	Q
5	Marco Krause	Germany	21.33	
6	Pascal Lucea	France	21.39	
7	Davian Clarke	Jamaica	21.51	
8	Atsuo Narita	Japan	21.67	

==== Quarterfinal 2 ====
Wind: +1.4 m/s

Rank	Name	Nationality	Time	Notes
1	Ian Mackie	United Kingdom	21.00	Q
2	Deji Aliu	Nigeria	21.17	Q
3	Ibrahim Meité	Côte d'Ivoire	21.23	Q
4	Markus Lindahl	Finland	21.30	Q
5	Marcin Krzywański	Poland	21.50	
6	Etienne Roux	South Africa	21.98	
7	Jacques Sambou	Senegal	22.11	
	Lorenzo Robinson	Jamaica	DNS	

==== Quarterfinal 3 ====
Wind: +1.8 m/s

Rank	Name	Nationality	Time	Notes
1	Mark Keddell	New Zealand	21.02	Q
2	Obadele Thompson	Barbados	21.13	Q
3	Yoshihiro Arima	Japan	21.27	Q
4	Venancio José	Spain	21.32	Q
5	Ulysses Hammelstein	Germany	21.53	
6	Ruddy Zami	France	21.82	
7	Bogdan Zamostyanyuk	Ukraine	21.92	
	César Jongitud	Mexico	DNS	

==== Quarterfinal 4 ====
Wind: +0.9 m/s

Rank	Name	Nationality	Time	Notes
1	Julian Golding	United Kingdom	21.10	Q
2	Eric Frempong-Manso	Canada	21.27	Q
3	Bryan Howard	United States	21.33	Q
4	Unai Landa	Spain	21.58	Q
5	Andrey Taranenko	Kazakhstan	21.92	
6	Sylvester Omodiale	Nigeria	22.15	
7	Peter Frederick	Trinidad and Tobago	22.26	
	Judson Jervis	Bahamas	DQ	IAAF rule 163.3

=== Heats ===
22 July

==== Heat 1 ====
Wind: +0.5 m/s

Rank	Name	Nationality	Time	Notes
1	Tony Wheeler	United States	21.04	Q
2	Marco Krause	Germany	21.38	Q
3	Davian Clarke	Jamaica	21.65	Q
4	Rudolph Louw	South Africa	21.69	Q
5	Emiliano Bertuzzi	Italy	21.92	
6	John Ertzgaard	Norway	22.07	
7	Fekadu Legesse	Ethiopia	23.02	

==== Heat 2 ====
Wind: +0.5 m/s

Rank	Name	Nationality	Time	Notes
1	Mark Keddell	New Zealand	21.24	Q
2	Unai Landa	Spain	21.62	Q
3	Andrey Taranenko	Kazakhstan	22.05	Q
4	César López	Mexico	22.16	Q
5	Tze Yong Chan	Singapore	23.19	
	Carlton Chambers	Canada	DQ	

==== Heat 3 ====
Wind: 0.0 m/s

Rank	Name	Nationality	Time	Notes
1	Markus Lindahl	Finland	21.64	Q
2	Bryan Howard	United States	21.70	Q
3	Peter Frederick	Trinidad and Tobago	22.16	Q
4	Sylvester Omodiale	Nigeria	22.27	Q
5	Gavin Davis	Australia	22.35	
6	José Chato	Mozambique	22.79	
7	Steve Augustine	British Virgin Islands	22.82	
	Tesfaye Jenbere	Ethiopia	DQ	IAAF rule 163.3

==== Heat 4 ====
Wind: +1.3 m/s

Rank	Name	Nationality	Time	Notes
1	Obadele Thompson	Barbados	21.35	Q
2	Yoshihiro Arima	Japan	21.59	Q
3	Todd Blythe	New Zealand	21.60	Q
4	Marcin Krzywański	Poland	21.62	Q
5	Venancio José	Spain	21.64	q
6	Moses Kondowe	Malawi	22.75	
7	Mohamed Shujau	Maldives	23.43	

==== Heat 5 ====
Wind: +0.6 m/s

Rank	Name	Nationality	Time	Notes
1	Julian Golding	United Kingdom	21.33	Q
2	Ibrahim Meité	Côte d'Ivoire	21.41	Q
3	Jacques Sambou	Senegal	21.87	Q
4	Atsuo Narita	Japan	21.95	Q
5	Aleksey Andriunin	Russia	22.14	
6	Azmi Ibrahim	Malaysia	22.93	
7	Jean Baptiste Haba	Guinea	24.26	
	Brian Babbs	Bahamas	DQ	IAAF rule 163.3

==== Heat 6 ====
Wind: +1.2 m/s

Rank	Name	Nationality	Time	Notes
1	Ian Mackie	United Kingdom	21.06	Q
2	Han Chaoming	China	21.14	Q
3	Deji Aliu	Nigeria	21.23	Q
4	Ulysses Hammelstein	Germany	21.36	Q
5	Judson Jervis	Bahamas	21.60	q
6	Lorenzo Robinson	Jamaica	21.67	q
7	Pascal Lucea	France	21.76	q
8	Stéphane Buckland	Mauritius	22.26	

==== Heat 7 ====
Wind: +1.8 m/s

Rank	Name	Nationality	Time	Notes
1	Eric Frempong-Manso	Canada	21.25	Q
2	Bogdan Zamostyanyuk	Ukraine	21.88	Q
3	Ruddy Zami	France	21.90	Q
4	Etienne Roux	South Africa	21.96	Q
5	Nixon Rotich	Kenya	22.66	
6	Rukesh Bajracharia	Nepal	23.55	
	Patrick De Clercq	Belgium	DNF	

== Participation ==
According to an unofficial count, 51 athletes from 38 countries participated in the event.

- Australia (1)
- Bahamas (2)
- Barbados (1)
- Belgium (1)
- British Virgin Islands (1)
- Canada (2)
- China (1)
- Côte d'Ivoire (1)
- Ethiopia (2)
- Finland (1)
- France (2)
- Germany (2)
- Guinea (1)
- Italy (1)
- Jamaica (2)
- Japan (2)
- Kazakhstan (1)
- Kenya (1)
- Malawi (1)
- Malaysia (1)
- Maldives (1)
- Mauritius (1)
- Mexico (1)
- Mozambique (1)
- Nepal (1)
- New Zealand (2)
- Nigeria (2)
- Norway (1)
- Poland (1)
- Russia (1)
- Senegal (1)
- Singapore (1)
- South Africa (2)
- Spain (2)
- Trinidad and Tobago (1)
- Ukraine (1)
- United Kingdom (2)
- United States (2)
