= 1994 World Junior Championships in Athletics – Men's 100 metres =

The men's 100 metres event at the 1994 World Junior Championships in Athletics was held in Lisbon, Portugal, at Estádio Universitário de Lisboa on 20 and 21 July.

== Medalists ==
Gold	Deji Aliu; Nigeria
Silver	Jason Gardener; United Kingdom
Bronze	Deworski Odom; United States

== Results ==
=== Final ===
21 July
Wind: +1.2 m/s

Rank	Name	Nationality	Time	Notes
1st place, gold medalist(s)	Deji Aliu	Nigeria	10.21	
2nd place, silver medalist(s)	Jason Gardener	United Kingdom	10.25	
3rd place, bronze medalist(s)	Deworski Odom	United States	10.26	
4	Obadele Thompson	Barbados	10.29	
5	Carlton Chambers	Canada	10.30	
6	Ibrahim Meité	Côte d'Ivoire	10.34	
7	Eric Frempong-Manso	Canada	10.37	
8	Julian Golding	United Kingdom	10.46	

=== Semifinals ===
21 July

==== Semifinal 1 ====
Wind: +1.1 m/s

Rank	Name	Nationality	Time	Notes
1	Ibrahim Meité	Côte d'Ivoire	10.38	Q
2	Deworski Odom	United States	10.42	Q
3	Julian Golding	United Kingdom	10.43	Q
4	Eric Frempong-Manso	Canada	10.47	Q
5	Sultan Mohamed Al-Sheib	Qatar	10.53	
6	Marcin Krzywański	Poland	10.55	
7	Ángelos Pavlakákis	Greece	10.64	
	Vitaly Seniv	Ukraine	DNS	

==== Semifinal 2 ====
Wind: +0.8 m/s

Rank	Name	Nationality	Time	Notes
1	Deji Aliu	Nigeria	10.27	Q
2	Jason Gardener	United Kingdom	10.35	Q
3	Obadele Thompson	Barbados	10.43	Q
4	Carlton Chambers	Canada	10.56	Q
5	Toya Jones	United States	10.66	
6	Erlend Saeterstol	Norway	10.73	
7	Azmi Ibrahim	Malaysia	10.76	
8	Sébastien Jamain	France	10.83	

=== Quarterfinals ===
20 July

==== Quarterfinal 1 ====
Wind: +0.2 m/s

Rank	Name	Nationality	Time	Notes
1	Obadele Thompson	Barbados	10.38	Q
2	Ibrahim Meité	Côte d'Ivoire	10.45	Q
3	Carlton Chambers	Canada	10.50	Q
4	Ángelos Pavlakákis	Greece	10.67	Q
5	Masato Ebiwasa	Japan	10.72	
6	Marc-Oliver Schmidtchen	Germany	10.72	
7	Cédric Grand	Switzerland	10.73	
8	Han Chaoming	China	10.79	

==== Quarterfinal 2 ====
Wind: +1.6 m/s

Rank	Name	Nationality	Time	Notes
1	Deworski Odom	United States	10.35	Q
2	Jason Gardener	United Kingdom	10.40	Q
3	Erlend Saeterstol	Norway	10.51	Q
4	Eric Frempong-Manso	Canada	10.54	Q
5	David Patros	France	10.64	
6	Venancio José	Spain	10.69	
7	Aleksander Streltsov	Ukraine	10.76	
8	Michael Stewart	Costa Rica	10.88	

==== Quarterfinal 3 ====
Wind: +2.2 m/s

Rank	Name	Nationality	Time	Notes
1	Deji Aliu	Nigeria	10.41 w	Q
2	Azmi Ibrahim	Malaysia	10.48 w	Q
3	Sultan Mohamed Al-Sheib	Qatar	10.49 w	Q
4	Sébastien Jamain	France	10.64 w	Q
5	Brian Babbs	Bahamas	10.65 w	
6	Todd Blythe	New Zealand	10.66 w	
7	Thomas Mittendrein	Germany	10.72 w	
	Haralambos Papadias	Greece	DNS	

==== Quarterfinal 4 ====
Wind: +1.3 m/s

Rank	Name	Nationality	Time	Notes
1	Julian Golding	United Kingdom	10.43	Q
2	Marcin Krzywański	Poland	10.49	Q
3	Toya Jones	United States	10.58	Q
4	Vitaly Seniv	Ukraine	10.59	Q
5	Huang Hsin-Ping	Chinese Taipei	10.64	
6	Plamen Slavchev	Bulgaria	10.67	
7	Chris Donaldson	New Zealand	10.78	
8	Sylvester Omodiale	Nigeria	10.89	

=== Heats ===
20 July

==== Heat 1 ====
Wind: +0.1 m/s

Rank	Name	Nationality	Time	Notes
1	Jason Gardener	United Kingdom	10.48	Q
2	David Patros	France	10.64	Q
3	Masato Ebiwasa	Japan	10.66	Q
4	Cédric Grand	Switzerland	10.67	q
5	Rudolph Louw	South Africa	10.78	
6	Conny Malm	Sweden	10.78	
7	Tze Yong Chan	Singapore	11.20	
8	José Chato	Mozambique	11.59	

==== Heat 2 ====
Wind: +0.3 m/s

Rank	Name	Nationality	Time	Notes
1	Obadele Thompson	Barbados	10.46	Q
2	Marcin Krzywański	Poland	10.50	Q
3	Ángelos Pavlakákis	Greece	10.62	Q
4	Aleksander Streltsov	Ukraine	10.70	q
5	Stuart McQuade	Ireland	10.74	
6	Lorenzo Germano	Italy	10.77	
7	César Jongitud	Mexico	10.83	

==== Heat 3 ====
Wind: +0.1 m/s

Rank	Name	Nationality	Time	Notes
1	Sébastien Jamain	France	10.60	Q
2	Sultan Mohamed Al-Sheib	Qatar	10.73	Q
3	Venancio José	Spain	10.83	Q
4	Markus Lindahl	Finland	10.84	
5	Etienne Roux	South Africa	10.89	
6	Chen Tzu-Lung	Chinese Taipei	11.07	
7	Jean Baptiste Haba	Guinea	11.62	
8	Rukesh Bajracharia	Nepal	11.78	

==== Heat 4 ====
Wind: +2.8 m/s

Rank	Name	Nationality	Time	Notes
1	Deji Aliu	Nigeria	10.41 w	Q
2	Azmi Ibrahim	Malaysia	10.67 w	Q
3	Plamen Slavchev	Bulgaria	10.71 w	Q
4	Judson Jervis	Bahamas	10.74 w	
5	Tadashi Imori	Japan	10.75 w	
6	Tesfaye Jenbere	Ethiopia	11.19 w	
7	Jurij Titov	Latvia	14.00 w	

==== Heat 5 ====
Wind: +1.5 m/s

Rank	Name	Nationality	Time	Notes
1	Julian Golding	United Kingdom	10.43	Q
2	Toya Jones	United States	10.63	Q
3	Eric Frempong-Manso	Canada	10.71	Q
4	Gábor Dobos	Hungary	10.76	
5	David Thom	Australia	10.78	
6	Fekadu Legesse	Ethiopia	11.38	
7	Frantz Valbona	Haiti	11.51	
8	Nixon Rotich	Kenya	11.56	

==== Heat 6 ====
Wind: +1.7 m/s

Rank	Name	Nationality	Time	Notes
1	Vitaly Seniv	Ukraine	10.58	Q
2	Carlton Chambers	Canada	10.62	Q
3	Thomas Mittendrein	Germany	10.73	Q
4	Haralambos Papadias	Greece	10.73	q
5	Chris Donaldson	New Zealand	10.73	q
6	Haukur Sigurdsson	Iceland	10.99	
7	Mohamed Shujau	Maldives	11.52	
	Vladislav Chernobay	Kyrgyzstan	DNF	

==== Heat 7 ====
Wind: +1.3 m/s

Rank	Name	Nationality	Time	Notes
1	Todd Blythe	New Zealand	10.78	Q
2	Michael Stewart	Costa Rica	10.87	Q
3	Sylvester Omodiale	Nigeria	10.91	Q
4	Aleksey Andriunin	Russia	10.91	
5	Anselm Felix	Saint Lucia	11.32	
6	Rolando Lampa	Philippines	11.35	
7	Juan Pablo Faúndez	Chile	12.17	

==== Heat 8 ====
Wind: +1.5 m/s

Rank	Name	Nationality	Time	Notes
1	Deworski Odom	United States	10.42	Q
2	Erlend Saeterstol	Norway	10.43	Q
3	Huang Hsin-Ping	Chinese Taipei	10.60	Q
4	Marc-Oliver Schmidtchen	Germany	10.62	q
5	Bernard Burrell	Jamaica	10.73	
6	César López	Mexico	11.10	
7	Odair Baia	São Tomé and Príncipe	12.03	

==== Heat 9 ====
Wind: +1.1 m/s

Rank	Name	Nationality	Time	Notes
1	Ibrahim Meité	Côte d'Ivoire	10.44	Q
2	Han Chaoming	China	10.61	Q
3	Brian Babbs	Bahamas	10.80	Q
4	Eduardo Ugarte	Spain	10.81	
5	Yacine Djellil	Algeria	10.81	
6	Andrey Taranenko	Kazakhstan	10.81	

== Participation ==
According to an unofficial count, 66 athletes from 50 countries participated in the event.

- Algeria (1)
- Australia (1)
- Bahamas (2)
- Barbados (1)
- Bulgaria (1)
- Canada (2)
- Chile (1)
- China (1)
- Chinese Taipei (2)
- Costa Rica (1)
- Côte d'Ivoire (1)
- Ethiopia (2)
- Finland (1)
- France (2)
- Germany (2)
- Greece (2)
- Guinea (1)
- Haiti (1)
- Hungary (1)
- Iceland (1)
- Ireland (1)
- Italy (1)
- Jamaica (1)
- Japan (2)
- Kazakhstan (1)
- Kenya (1)
- Kyrgyzstan (1)
- Latvia (1)
- Malaysia (1)
- Maldives (1)
- Mexico (2)
- Mozambique (1)
- Nepal (1)
- New Zealand (2)
- Nigeria (2)
- Norway (1)
- Philippines (1)
- Poland (1)
- Qatar (1)
- Russia (1)
- Saint Lucia (1)
- São Tomé and Príncipe (1)
- Singapore (1)
- South Africa (2)
- Spain (2)
- Sweden (1)
- Switzerland (1)
- Ukraine (2)
- United Kingdom (2)
- United States (2)
