= 1994 World Junior Championships in Athletics – Men's 400 metres =

The men's 400 metres event at the 1994 World Junior Championships in Athletics was held in Lisbon, Portugal, at Estádio Universitário de Lisboa on 20, 21 and 22 July.

== Medalists ==
Gold	Awotoro Adediran; Nigeria
Silver	Ramon Clay; United States
Bronze	Shaun Farrell; New Zealand

== Results ==
=== Final ===
22 July

Rank	Name	Nationality	Time	Notes
1st place, gold medalist(s)	Awotoro Adediran	Nigeria	45.83	
2nd place, silver medalist(s)	Ramon Clay	United States	46.13	
3rd place, bronze medalist(s)	Shaun Farrell	New Zealand	46.31	
4	Mark Hylton	United Kingdom	46.37	
5	Desmond Johnson	United States	46.38	
6	Riaan Dempers	South Africa	47.31	
7	Rohan McDonald	Jamaica	47.62	
8	Kunle Adejuyigbe	Nigeria	48.05	

=== Semifinals ===
21 July

==== Semifinal 1 ====
Rank	Name	Nationality	Time	Notes
1	Michael McDonald	Jamaica	46.30	Q
2	Shaun Farrell	New Zealand	46.52	Q
3	Desmond Johnson	United States	46.64	Q
4	Riaan Dempers	South Africa	46.74	Q
5	Francis Obikwelu	Nigeria	46.79	
6	Mitsumasa Hattori	Japan	47.72	
7	Rui Costa	Portugal	49.30	
8	Chris Robinson	Canada	50.36	

==== Semifinal 2 ====
Rank	Name	Nationality	Time	Notes
1	Ramon Clay	United States	47.10	Q
2	Mark Hylton	United Kingdom	47.29	Q
3	Rohan McDonald	Jamaica	47.49	Q
4	Kunle Adejuyigbe	Nigeria	47.99	Q
5	Adem Hecini	Algeria	48.00	
6	Dirk Pretorius	South Africa	48.21	
7	Víctor Goulart	Brazil	48.94	
8	Peter Frederick	Trinidad and Tobago	49.18	

=== Quarterfinals ===
21 July

==== Quarterfinal 1 ====
Rank	Name	Nationality	Time	Notes
1	Rohan McDonald	Jamaica	47.36	Q
2	Dirk Pretorius	South Africa	47.61	Q
3	Adem Hecini	Algeria	47.64	Q
4	Víctor Goulart	Brazil	47.84	Q
5	Walter Pirovano	Italy	47.91	
6	Dan Monea	Romania	48.24	
7	Donald Bruno	United States	48.82	
	Kenneth Moima	Botswana	DNS	

==== Quarterfinal 2 ====
Rank	Name	Nationality	Time	Notes
1	Desmond Johnson	United States	46.77	Q
2	Francis Obikwelu	Nigeria	46.92	Q
3	Shaun Farrell	New Zealand	47.10	Q
4	Mitsumasa Hattori	Japan	47.55	Q
5	Petri Pohjonen	Finland	47.85	
6	Vincent van Rooyen	Namibia	47.96	
7	Kim Jung-Hoon	South Korea	48.96	
8	John McClymont	Australia	49.26	

==== Quarterfinal 3 ====
Rank	Name	Nationality	Time	Notes
1	Mark Hylton	United Kingdom	47.07	Q
2	Michael McDonald	Jamaica	47.23	Q
3	Kunle Adejuyigbe	Nigeria	47.52	Q
4	Peter Frederick	Trinidad and Tobago	48.01	Q
5	Robert Loubli	France	48.11	
6	Panayiótis Sarrís	Greece	48.17	
7	Tsvetomir Marinov	Bulgaria	49.00	
8	Getahun Workesa	Ethiopia	49.15	

==== Quarterfinal 4 ====
Rank	Name	Nationality	Time	Notes
1	Ramon Clay	United States	48.05	Q
2	Riaan Dempers	South Africa	48.68	Q
3	Rui Costa	Portugal	48.95	Q
4	Chris Robinson	Canada	49.02	Q
5	Alessandro Bracciali	Italy	49.32	
6	Georkis Vera	Cuba	49.61	
7	Boštjan Horvat	Slovenia	50.34	
	Guy Bullock	United Kingdom	DNS	

=== Heats ===
20 July

==== Heat 1 ====
Rank	Name	Nationality	Time	Notes
1	Desmond Johnson	United States	47.87	Q
2	Donald Bruno	United States	48.55	Q
3	Walter Pirovano	Italy	48.95	Q
4	Getahun Workesa	Ethiopia	49.07	Q
5	Kiprotich Chemase	Kenya	49.68	
6	Ali Moubarak	United Arab Emirates	49.93	

==== Heat 2 ====
Rank	Name	Nationality	Time	Notes
1	Rohan McDonald	Jamaica	47.43	Q
2	Mark Hylton	United Kingdom	47.49	Q
3	Robert Loubli	France	48.38	Q
4	Boštjan Horvat	Slovenia	49.28	Q
5	Shoji Taga	Japan	49.39	
6	Dennis Darling	Bahamas	49.58	
7	Steve Augustine	British Virgin Islands	50.33	
8	Soliman Hamed	Sudan	51.11	

==== Heat 3 ====
Rank	Name	Nationality	Time	Notes
1	Michael McDonald	Jamaica	47.09	Q
2	Kunle Adejuyigbe	Nigeria	47.49	Q
3	Panayiótis Sarrís	Greece	48.43	Q
4	Chris Robinson	Canada	48.51	Q
5	Alessandro Bracciali	Italy	48.88	q
6	Tsvetomir Marinov	Bulgaria	48.91	q
7	Bedasa Tafa	Ethiopia	50.05	

==== Heat 4 ====
Rank	Name	Nationality	Time	Notes
1	Adem Hecini	Algeria	47.66	Q
2	Riaan Dempers	South Africa	47.81	Q
3	Mitsumasa Hattori	Japan	48.08	Q
4	Víctor Goulart	Brazil	48.36	Q
5	Dan Monea	Romania	48.50	q
6	Petri Pohjonen	Finland	48.84	q
7	Nicos Christofi	Cyprus	50.01	

==== Heat 5 ====
Rank	Name	Nationality	Time	Notes
1	Ramon Clay	United States	47.32	Q
2	Shaun Farrell	New Zealand	47.72	Q
3	Kim Jung-Hoon	South Korea	48.53	Q
4	Vincent van Rooyen	Namibia	48.54	Q
5	Gunther Dekie	Belgium	48.93	
	Moses Kondowe	Malawi	DQ	IAAF rule 163.3

==== Heat 6 ====
Rank	Name	Nationality	Time	Notes
1	Georkis Vera	Cuba	48.26	Q
2	Guy Bullock	United Kingdom	48.86	Q
3	John McClymont	Australia	49.17	Q
4	Kenneth Moima	Botswana	49.57	Q
5	Frederico Afonso	Angola	50.93	
6	Fabio Canini	San Marino	53.51	
	Yeóryios Batsikas	Greece	DQ	IAAF rule 163.3

==== Heat 7 ====
Rank	Name	Nationality	Time	Notes
1	Francis Obikwelu	Nigeria	47.22	Q
2	Dirk Pretorius	South Africa	47.91	Q
3	Rui Costa	Portugal	47.99	Q
4	Peter Frederick	Trinidad and Tobago	48.71	Q
5	Yosvany González	Cuba	49.28	
6	Pablo Vallejo Navio	Spain	49.43	
7	Frank Paaga	American Samoa	60.49	

== Participation ==
According to an unofficial count, 48 athletes from 37 countries participated in the event.

- Algeria (1)
- American Samoa (1)
- Angola (1)
- Australia (1)
- Bahamas (1)
- Belgium (1)
- Botswana (1)
- Brazil (1)
- British Virgin Islands (1)
- Bulgaria (1)
- Canada (1)
- Cuba (2)
- Cyprus (1)
- Ethiopia (2)
- Finland (1)
- France (1)
- Greece (2)
- Italy (2)
- Jamaica (2)
- Japan (2)
- Kenya (1)
- Malawi (1)
- Namibia (1)
- New Zealand (1)
- Nigeria (2)
- Portugal (1)
- Romania (1)
- San Marino (1)
- Slovenia (1)
- South Africa (2)
- South Korea (1)
- Spain (1)
- Sudan (1)
- Trinidad and Tobago (1)
- United Arab Emirates (1)
- United Kingdom (2)
- United States (3)
