= Julian Golding =

English sprinter

Personal information
- Nationality: British (English)
- Born: 17 February 1975 (age 51) Harlesden, North West London, England

Sport
- Sport: Athletics
- Event: Sprints
Medal record
Men's athletics
Representing Great Britain
World Championships
Bronze medal – third place	1997 Athens	4×100 m
European Championships
Gold medal – first place	1998 Budapest	4×100 m
Bronze medal – third place	1998 Budapest	200 m
Representing England
Commonwealth Games
Gold medal – first place	1998 Kuala Lumpur	200 m
Gold medal – first place	1998 Kuala Lumpur	4×100 m

Julian Emmanuel Golding is a former international sprinter from England.

== Biography ==
Golding was born in Harlesden, North West London and attended St Augustine's Church of England High School in Kilburn, where he enjoyed playing all sports before taking up athletics seriously in 1991. He was discovered by former Olympic sprinter Mike McFarlane, after finishing second at the Westminster Schools Athletics Competition. On 18 July 2012, Golding graduated from Middlesex University with First Class Honours for Sports and Exercise Science with Teaching & Coaching.

At the 1998 European Athletics Championships, Golding was favourite to win the gold medal in the 200 metres. After running a series of fast times and winning both heats and semi-finals convincingly, he was beaten by teammate Dougie Walker in the final, winning a bronze medal.

In the same year, he represented England and won two gold medals in the 200 metres and 4 × 100 metres relay, at the 1998 Commonwealth Games in Kuala Lumpur, Malaysia. In the 200 metres he set a personal best time of 20.34 seconds in the semi-finals. In the 4 × 100 metres sprint relay, the team ran a new Commonwealth Games record of 38.20 seconds. He also helped the Great British 4 × 100-metre relay team to victory in the 1998 IAAF World Cup and European Cup, as well as running the last leg at the 1997 World Championships in Athens, in which Britain won bronze.

During the 1999 athletic season, Golding won the national title in 20.20 seconds (wind assisted) and continued that form, winning some high-profile international Grand Prix events. The Crystal Grand Prix is considered to be one of Golding's best performances; he won the 200 metres from a world class field in the time of 20.23 seconds, running into a strong headwind of −1.1 metres per second. Golding went on to finish 7th in the final of the 1999 World Championships in Seville, and finished the year ranked number nine in the world.

He was part of Team GB's 4 × 100-metre relay team at the 2000 Summer Olympics in Sydney, but the team were disqualified in the first round. He failed to qualify for his preferred event, due to illness at the Olympic Trials.

Golding was twice British 200 metres champion after winning the British AAA Championships title at the 1999 AAA Championships and the 2003 AAA Championships.

Golding's last major competition was in 2003, where he represented Great Britain at the Paris World Championships. Three years later, he was forced to retire prematurely due to persistent injuries.

Julian is now a qualified P.E teacher working at St Mary Magdalene's Secondary Phase.

== Personal bests ==
His time of 20.18 seconds (−0.2) ranks him sixth on the 200 metres All-Time UK rankings, with only John Regis, Christian Malcolm, Linford Christie, Darren Campbell and Adam Gemili ahead of him.

- 100 metres – 10.28 (1998)
- 200 metres – 20.18 (1998)
- 150 metres – 15.39w (1995)

== Achievements ==
Year	Competition	Venue	Position	Event	Notes
Representing the United Kingdom and England
1994	World Junior Championships	Lisbon, Portugal	8th	100 m	10.46 (wind: +1.2 m/s)
1994	World Junior Championships	Lisbon, Portugal	9th (sf)	200 m	21.21 (wind: +1.9 m/s)
1994	World Junior Championships	Lisbon, Portugal	1st	4 × 100 m relay	39.60
1997	European U23 Championships	Turku, Finland	1st	200 m	20.46 (wind: +0.3 m/s)
1997	European U23 Championships	Turku, Finland	1st	4 × 100 m relay	38.99
1997	World Championships	Athens, Greece	3rd	4 × 100 m relay	38.14
1998	European Championships	Budapest, Hungary	3rd	200 metres	20.72
1998	European Championships	Budapest, Hungary	1st	4 × 100 m relay	38.52
1998	Commonwealth Games	Kuala Lumpur, Malaysia	1st	200 metres	20.18
1998	Commonwealth Games	Kuala Lumpur, Malaysia	1st	4 × 100 m relay	38.20
2000	European Indoor Championships	Ghent, Belgium	3rd	200 metres	21.05
