= John Ertzgaard =

Kenyan-Norwegian sprinter (born 1977)

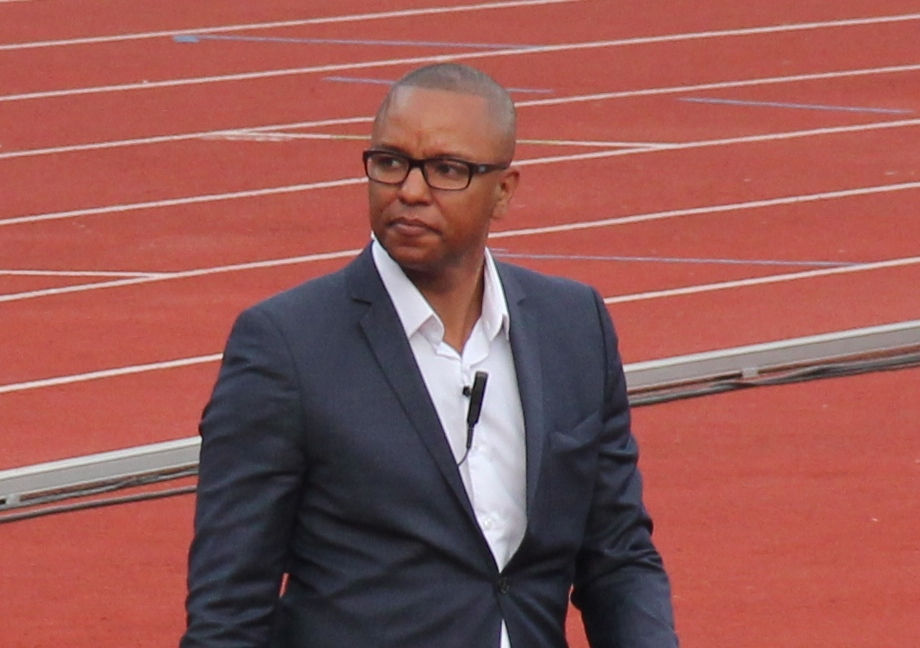
John Ertzgaard at Bislett Games 2017

John Ertzgaard (born June 18, 1977, in Nairobi, Kenya) is a Kenyan-Norwegian former athlete who specialized in the sprinting events.

His father is Norwegian and his mother is Ugandan. His mother, a member of the Lango people, had escaped to Kenya as a refugee during Idi Amin's reign in Uganda. Ertzgaard's father worked for the development agency Norad, and the family lived in Kenya and Zambia before they moved to Norway when Ertzgaard was nine.

His only major medal was the gold in 200 meters at the 1999 European U23 Championships. He competed at the 2000 Olympic Games in Sydney without advancing to the second round. The biggest success of his career was reaching the semifinals of the 1999 World Championships in Seville.

== Competition record ==
Year	Competition	Venue	Position	Event	Notes
Representing Norway
1994	World Junior Championships	Lisbon, Portugal	31st (h)	200m	22.07 (wind: +0.5 m/s)
1994	World Junior Championships	Lisbon, Portugal	8th	4 × 100 m relay	41.79
1998	European Indoor Championships	Valencia, Spain	29th (h)	60 m	6.80
1998	European Championships	Budapest, Hungary	18th (h)	100 m	10.48
1998	European Championships	Budapest, Hungary	9th (h)	4 × 100 m relay	39.77
1999	European U23 Championships	Gothenburg, Sweden	4th	100 m	10.29 w (wind: +2.8 m/s)
1999	European U23 Championships	Gothenburg, Sweden	1st	200 m	20.47 (wind: -0.6 m/s)
1999	World Championships	Seville, Spain	13th (sf)	200 m	20.72
2000	European Indoor Championships	Ghent, Belgium	12th (h)	200 m	21.19
2000	Olympic Games	Sydney, Australia	39th (h)	200 m	21.00
2001	World Championships	Edmonton, Canada	19th (qf)	100 m	10.25
2001	World Championships	Edmonton, Canada	28th (qf)	200 m	20.88
2002	European Indoor Championships	Vienna, Austria	7th	60 m	6.74
2002	European Championships	Munich, Germany	14th (sf)	100 m	10.45
2002	European Championships	Munich, Germany	18th (qf)	200 m	21.14
2006	European Championships	Gothenburg, Sweden	34th (h)	100 m	10.62
2006	European Championships	Gothenburg, Sweden	13th (h)	4 × 100 m relay	40.36

== Personal Best ==
Outdoor

- 100 m – 10.25 (Edmonton 2001)
- 200 m – 20.47 (Gothenburg 1999)
- 400 m – 46.80 (2001)

Indoor

- 60 m – 6.70 (Vienna 2002)
- 100 m – 10.47 (Tampere 2000)
- 200 m – 21.08 (Gothenburg 2000)
