= Athletics at the 2000 Summer Olympics – Men's 200 metres =

Men's 200 metres at the Games of the XXVII Olympiad
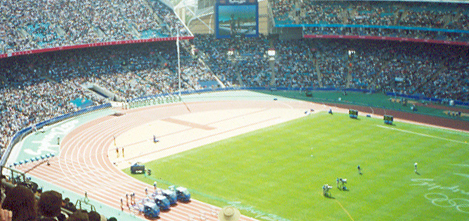
- Stadium Australia
- Venue: Stadium Australia
- Dates: 27–28 September
- Competitors: 67 from 50 nations
- Winning time: 20.09

Medalists
1st place, gold medalist(s)		Konstantinos Kenteris; Greece
2nd place, silver medalist(s)		Darren Campbell; Great Britain
3rd place, bronze medalist(s)		Ato Boldon; Trinidad and Tobago

The men's 200 metres at the 2000 Summer Olympics was held at Stadium Australia on Wednesday 27 September and Thursday 28 September 2000 as part of the athletics programme. 67 competitors from 50 nations took part with Konstantinos Kenteris of Greece taking the victory and winning the nation's first medal in the event. Darren Campbell's silver was Great Britain's first men's 200 metres medal since 1980 and matched the nation's best result in the event (third silver with no golds). Ato Boldon of Trinidad and Tobago repeated as bronze medalist, the ninth man to earn multiple medals in the 200 metres.

== Background ==
This was the 23rd appearance of the event, which was not held at the first Olympics in 1896 but has been on the program ever since. Two of the eight finalists from the 1996 Games returned: bronze medalist Ato Boldon of Trinidad and Tobago and fourth-place finisher Obadele Thompson of Barbados. Boldon had won the 1997 World Championship; Maurice Greene of the United States won in 1999. Neither Greene nor reigning Olympic champion and world record holder Michael Johnson, both suffering from minor injuries, made the U.S. team in the 200 metres (though they did in other events).

Dominica, Kazakhstan, Saint Kitts and Nevis, and Slovakia each made their debut in the event. The United States made its 22nd appearance, most of any nation, having missed only the boycotted 1980 Games.

== Qualification ==
The qualification period for athletics took place between 1 January 1999 to 11 September 2000. For the men's 200 metres, each National Olympic Committee was permitted to enter up to three athletes that had run the race in 20.70 seconds or faster during the qualification period. If an NOC had no athletes that qualified under that standard, one athlete that had run the race in 20.90 seconds or faster could be entered.

The maximum number of athletes per nation had been set at 3 since the 1930 Olympic Congress.

== Competition format ==
The competition used the four round format introduced in 1920: heats, quarterfinals, semifinals, and a final. The "fastest loser" system introduced in 1960 was used in the heats.

There were 9 heats of 7 or 8 runners each, with the top 3 men in each advancing to the quarterfinals along with the next 5 fastest overall. The quarterfinals consisted of 4 heats of 8 athletes each; the 4 fastest men in each heat advanced to the semifinals. There were 2 semifinals, each with 8 runners. The top 4 athletes in each semifinal advanced. The final had 8 runners. The races were run on a 400-metre track.

== Records ==
These were the standing world and Olympic records (in seconds) prior to the Olympics.

World record	Michael Johnson (USA)	19.32	Atlanta, United States	1 August 1996
Olympic record	Michael Johnson (USA)	19.32	Atlanta, United States	1 August 1996

No new world or Olympic records were set during the competition.

== Schedule ==
All times are Australian Eastern Standard Time (UTC+10)

Date	Time	Round
Wednesday, 27 September 2000	10:05; 19:30	Heats; Quarterfinals
Thursday, 28 September 2000	18:20; 20:20	Semifinals; Final

== Results ==
All times shown are in seconds.

=== Heats ===
==== Heat 1 ====
Rank	Lane	Athlete	Nation	Reaction	Time	Notes
1	1	Francis Obikwelu	Nigeria	0.201	20.76	Q
2	8	Stéphan Buckland	Mauritius	0.269	20.81	Q
3	5	Renward Wells	Bahamas	0.147	20.95	Q
4	6	John Ertzgaard	Norway	0.154	21.00	
5	3	Sayon Cooper	Liberia	0.261	21.10	
6	4	Albert Agyemang	Ghana	0.240	21.22	
7	7	Jayson Jones	Belize	0.163	22.20	
—	2	Mohamed Mahbub Alam	Bangladesh	0.240	DNF	
				Wind: −0.3 m/s		

==== Heat 2 ====
Rank	Lane	Athlete	Nation	Reaction	Time	Notes
1	7	Floyd Heard	United States	0.167	20.68	Q
2	4	Koji Ito	Japan	0.191	20.75	Q, SB
3	8	Tommi Hartonen	Finland	0.187	20.82	Q
4	5	Petko Yankov	Bulgaria	0.152	20.91	q
5	2	Darryl Wohlsen	Australia	0.161	20.98	
6	6	Pierre Browne	Canada	0.258	21.28	
–	3	Tanko Braimah	Ghana	0.192	DSQ	R163.3
				Wind: −0.2 m/s		

==== Heat 3 ====
Rank	Lane	Athlete	Nation	Reaction	Time	Notes
1	2	Ato Boldon	Trinidad and Tobago	0.157	20.52	Q
2	5	Kim Collins	Saint Kitts and Nevis	0.175	20.52	Q
3	4	Marcin Urbaś	Poland	0.152	20.62	Q
4	7	Geir Moen	Norway	0.160	20.76	q
5	8	Gidon Jablonka	Israel	0.185	20.92	
6	3	Gennadiy Chernovol	Kazakhstan	0.190	20.95	SB
—	6	Alexios Alexopoulos	Greece	—	DNS	
				Wind: +0.5 m/s		

==== Heat 4 ====
Rank	Lane	Athlete	Nation	Reaction	Time	Notes
1	6	Coby Miller	United States	0.182	20.49	Q
2	4	Darren Campbell	Great Britain	0.194	20.71	Q
3	5	Uchenna Emedolu	Nigeria	0.179	20.87	Q
4	7	Ahmed Douhou	Ivory Coast	0.169	20.98	
5	2	Ricardo Williams	Jamaica	0.289	21.09	
6	8	Julieon Raeburn	Trinidad and Tobago	0.326	21.21	
7	3	Keita Cline	British Virgin Islands	0.199	21.42	
				Wind: +0.2 m/s		

==== Heat 5 ====
Rank	Lane	Athlete	Nation	Reaction	Time	Notes
1	6	Konstantinos Kenteris	Greece	0.179	20.57	Q
2	5	Anninos Marcoullides	Cyprus	0.190	20.83	Q
3	2	Marlon Devonish	Great Britain	0.178	20.89	Q
4	3	André da Silva	Brazil	0.237	20.95	
5	8	Aleksandr Ryabov	Russia	0.216	21.02	
6	7	Marián Vanderka	Slovakia	0.254	21.28	
7	4	Ali Khamis Rashid Al-Neyadi	United Arab Emirates	0.280	21.93	
8	1	Christie van Wyk	Namibia	0.147	46.57	
				Wind: +0.3 m/s		

==== Heat 6 ====
Rank	Lane	Athlete	Nation	Reaction	Time	Notes
1	5	Christopher Williams	Jamaica	0.189	20.45	Q
2	1	Shingo Suetsugu	Japan	0.184	20.60	Q
3	7	Venancio José	Spain	0.179	20.95	Q
4	3	Martin Lachkovics	Austria	0.163	21.00	
5	4	Andrew Tynes	Bahamas	0.169	21.00	
6	6	Jimmy Pino	Colombia	0.179	21.42	
7	8	Pascal Dangbo	Benin	0.158	21.54	
8	2	Maqsood Ahmad	Pakistan	0.181	21.70	
				Wind: −0.4 m/s		

==== Heat 7 ====
Rank	Lane	Athlete	Nation	Reaction	Time	Notes
1	4	Obadele Thompson	Barbados	0.192	20.69	Q
2	8	Joseph Batangdon	Cameroon	0.176	20.70	Q
3	6	Antoine Boussombo	Gabon	0.161	20.78	Q
4	3	Matt Shirvington	Australia	0.168	20.91	q
5	1	Carlos Gats	Argentina	0.181	21.15	
6	5	Ricardo Roach	Chad	0.154	21.20	
7	7	Ezra Kenyoke Sambu	Kenya	0.377	21.23	
8	2	Sherwin James	Dominica	0.195	22.40	
				Wind: +0.5 m/s		

==== Heat 8 ====
Rank	Lane	Athlete	Nation	Reaction	Time	Notes
1	4	John Capel	United States	0.216	20.49	Q
2	6	Christian Malcolm	Great Britain	0.272	20.52	Q
3	5	Alessandro Cavallaro	Italy	0.192	20.58	Q
4	8	Héber Viera	Uruguay	0.180	20.82	q, SB
5	2	Patrick Johnson	Australia	0.225	20.88	q
6	7	Anastasios Gousis	Greece	0.325	21.10	
7	3	Salem M. M. Al Yami	Saudi Arabia	0.261	21.18	
				Wind: +0.4 m/s		

==== Heat 9 ====
Rank	Lane	Athlete	Nation	Reaction	Time	Notes
1	5	Claudinei da Silva	Brazil	0.176	20.70	Q
2	3	Dwight Thomas	Jamaica	0.192	20.85	Q
3	7	Oumar Loum	Senegal	0.201	20.87	Q
4	6	Paul Brizzell	Ireland	0.178	20.98	
5	1	Mohamed Al Hooti	Oman	0.226	21.19	
6	4	Dominic Demeritte	Bahamas	0.167	21.47	
7	2	Joseph Loua	Guinea	0.244	21.60	
8	8	N'Kosie Barnes	Antigua and Barbuda	0.205	21.82	
				Wind: −1.0 m/s		

==== Heats overall results ====
Rank	Athlete	Nation	Heat	Lane	Place	Wind	Time	Qual.	Record
1	Christopher Williams	Jamaica	6	5	1	-0.4	20.45	Q	
2	John Capel	United States	8	4	1	+0.4	20.49	Q	
2	Coby Miller	United States	4	6	1	+0.2	20.49	Q	
4	Ato Boldon	Trinidad and Tobago	3	2	1	+0.5	20.52	Q	
4	Kim Collins	Saint Kitts and Nevis	3	5	2	+0.5	20.52	Q	
4	Christian Malcolm	Great Britain	8	6	2	+0.4	20.52	Q	
7	Konstantinos Kenteris	Greece	5	6	1	+0.3	20.57	Q	
8	Alessandro Cavallaro	Italy	8	5	3	+0.4	20.58	Q	
9	Shingo Suetsugu	Japan	6	1	2	-0.4	20.60	Q	
10	Marcin Urbaś	Poland	3	4	3	+0.5	20.62	Q	
11	Floyd Heard	United States	2	7	1	-0.2	20.68	Q	
12	Obadele Thompson	Barbados	7	4	1	+0.5	20.69	Q	
13	Joseph Batangdon	Cameroon	7	8	2	+0.5	20.70	Q	
13	Claudinei da Silva	Brazil	9	5	1	-0.1	20.70	Q	
15	Darren Campbell	Great Britain	4	4	2	+0.2	20.71	Q	
16	Koji Ito	Japan	2	4	2	-0.2	20.75	Q	SB
17	Francis Obikwelu	Nigeria	1	1	1	-0.3	20.76	Q	
17	Geir Moen	Norway	3	7	4	+0.5	20.76	q	
19	Antoine Boussombo	Gabon	7	6	3	+0.5	20.78	Q	
20	Stéphan Buckland	Mauritius	1	8	2	-0.3	20.81	Q	
21	Tommi Hartonen	Finland	2	8	3	-0.2	20.82	Q	
21	Héber Viera	Uruguay	8	8	4	+0.4	20.82	q	SB
23	Anninos Marcoullides	Cyprus	5	5	2	+0.3	20.83	Q	
24	Dwight Thomas	Jamaica	9	3	2	-0.1	20.85	Q	
25	Uchenna Emedolu	Nigeria	4	5	3	+0.2	20.87	Q	
25	Oumar Loum	Senegal	9	7	3	-0.1	20.87	Q	
27	Patrick Johnson	Australia	8	2	5	+0.4	20.88	q	
28	Marlon Devonish	Great Britain	5	2	3	+0.3	20.89	Q	
29	Matt Shirvington	Australia	7	3	4	+0.5	20.91	q	
29	Petko Yankov	Bulgaria	2	5	4	-0.2	20.91	q	
31	Gidon Jablonka	Israel	3	8	5	+0.5	20.92		
32	Venancio José	Spain	6	7	3	-0.4	20.95	Q	
32	Renward Wells	Bahamas	1	5	3	-0.3	20.95	Q	
32	Gennadiy Chernovol	Kazakhstan	3	3	6	+0.5	20.95		
32	André da Silva	Brazil	5	3	4	+0.3	20.95		
36	Paul Brizzell	Ireland	9	6	4	-0.1	20.98		
36	Ahmed Yves Douhou	Ivory Coast	4	7	4	+0.2	20.98		
36	Darryl Wohlsen	Australia	2	2	5	-0.2	20.98		
39	John Ertzgaard	Norway	1	6	4	-0.3	21.00		
39	Martin Lachkovics	Austria	6	3	4	-0.4	21.00		
39	Andrew Tynes	Bahamas	6	4	5	-0.4	21.00 s		
42	Aleksandr Ryabov	Russia	5	8	5	+0.3	21.02		
43	Ricardo Williams	Jamaica	4	2	5	+0.2	21.09		
44	Sayon Cooper	Liberia	1	3	5	-0.3	21.10		
44	Anastasios Gousis	Greece	8	7	6	+0.4	21.10 s		
46	Carlos Gats	Argentina	7	1	5	+0.5	21.15		
47	Salem M. M. Al Yami	Saudi Arabia	8	3	7	+0.4	21.18		
48	Mohamed Al Hooti	Oman	9	1	5	-0.1	21.19		
49	Ricardo Roach	Chad	7	5	6	+0.5	21.20		
50	Julieon Raeburn	Trinidad and Tobago	4	8	6	+0.2	21.21		
51	Albert Agyemang	Ghana	1	4	6	-0.3	21.22		
52	Ezra Kenyoke Sambu	Kenya	7	7	7	+0.5	21.23		
53	Pierre Browne	Canada	2	6	6	-0.2	21.28		
53	Marián Vanderka	Slovakia	5	7	6	+0.3	21.28		
55	Keita Cline	British Virgin Islands	4	3	7	+0.2	21.42		
55	Jimmy Pino	Colombia	6	6	6	-0.4	21.42		
57	Dominic Demeritte	Bahamas	9	4	6	-0.1	21.47		
58	Pascal Dangbo	Benin	6	8	7	-0.4	21.54		
59	Joseph Loua	Guinea	9	2	7	-0.1	21.60		
60	Maqsood Ahmad	Pakistan	6	2	8	-0.4	21.70 s		
61	N'Kosie Barnes	Antigua and Barbuda	9	8	8	-0.1	21.82		
62	Ali K. R. A. Al Neyadi	United Arab Emirates	5	4	7	+0.3	21.93		
63	Jayson Jones	Belize	1	7	7	-0.3	22.20		
64	Sherwin James	Dominica	7	2	8	+0.5	22.40 s		
65	Christie van Wyk	Namibia	5	1	8	+0.3	46.57		
—	Tanko Braimah	Ghana	2	3	-	-0.2	DSQ		
—	Mohammad Mahabub Alam	Bangladesh	1	2	-	-0.3	DNF		
—	Alexios Alexopoulos	Greece	3	6	-	+0.5	DNS		

=== Quarterfinals ===
==== Quarterfinal 1 ====
Rank	Lane	Athlete	Nation	Reaction	Time	Notes
1	3	Darren Campbell	Great Britain	0.175	20.13	Q, PB
2	6	Konstantinos Kenteris	Greece	0.203	20.14	Q, NR
3	4	Ato Boldon	Trinidad and Tobago	0.160	20.28	Q
4	5	Shingo Suetsugu	Japan	0.182	20.37	Q
5	8	Marcin Urbaś	Poland	0.159	20.43	SB
6	7	Geir Moen	Norway	0.165	20.65	
7	2	Antoine Boussombo	Gabon	0.163	20.71	
8	1	Héber Viera	Uruguay	0.196	20.97	
				Wind: +0.3 m/s		

==== Quarterfinal 2 ====
Rank	Lane	Athlete	Nation	Reaction	Time	Notes
1	6	Obadele Thompson	Barbados	0.195	20.16	Q
2	3	Coby Miller	United States	0.239	20.37	Q
3	4	Kim Collins	Saint Kitts and Nevis	0.171	20.47	Q
4	5	Koji Ito	Japan	0.208	20.56	Q, SB
5	8	Dwight Thomas	Jamaica	0.206	20.58	PB
6	2	Petko Yankov	Bulgaria	0.169	20.75	
7	7	Venancio José	Spain	0.182	20.79	
8	1	Uchenna Emedolu	Nigeria	0.195	20.93	
				Wind: −0.0 m/s		

==== Quarterfinal 3 ====
Rank	Lane	Athlete	Nation	Reaction	Time	Notes
1	5	John Capel	United States	0.169	20.13	Q
2	3	Christian Malcolm	Great Britain	0.196	20.19	Q, PB
3	4	Claudinei da Silva	Brazil	0.139	20.24	Q
4	8	Tommi Hartonen	Finland	0.179	20.47	Q, NR
5	6	Joseph Batangdon	Cameroon	0.247	20.55	
6	3	Alessandro Cavallaro	Italy	0.190	20.95	SB
7	7	Patrick Johnson	Australia	0.252	20.87	
8	2	Renward Wells	Bahamas	0.162	21.26	
				Wind: −0.2 m/s		

==== Quarterfinal 4 ====
Rank	Lane	Athlete	Nation	Reaction	Time	Notes
1	5	Floyd Heard	United States	0.173	20.24	Q
2	4	Christopher Williams	Jamaica	0.187	20.25	Q
3	6	Francis Obikwelu	Nigeria	0.195	20.33	Q
4	3	Stéphan Buckland	Mauritius	0.237	20.53	Q
5	1	Oumar Loum	Senegal	0.186	20.60	
6	8	Anninos Marcoullides	Cyprus	0.196	20.71	SB
7	7	Marlon Devonish	Great Britain	0.163	20.82	
—	2	Matt Shirvington	Australia	–	DNS	
				Wind: +0.4 m/s		

==== Quarterfinals overall results ====
Rank	Athlete	Nation	Heat	Lane	Place	Wind	Time	Qual.	Record
1	Darren Campbell	Great Britain	1	3	1	+0.3	20.13	Q	PB
1	John Capel	United States	3	5	1	-0.2	20.13	Q	
3	Konstantinos Kenteris	Greece	1	6	2	+0.3	20.14	Q	NR
4	Obadele Thompson	Barbados	2	6	1	+0.0	20.16	Q	
5	Christian Malcolm	Great Britain	3	3	2	-0.2	20.19	Q	PB
6	Floyd Heard	United States	4	5	1	+0.4	20.24	Q	
6	Claudinei da Silva	Brazil	3	4	3	-0.2	20.24	Q	
8	Christopher Williams	Jamaica	4	4	2	+0.4	20.25	Q	
9	Ato Boldon	Trinidad and Tobago	1	4	3	+0.3	20.28	Q	
10	Francis Obikwelu	Nigeria	3	4	3	+0.5	20.33	Q	
11	Coby Miller	United States	2	3	2	+0.0	20.37	Q	
11	Shingo Suetsugu	Japan	1	5	4	+0.3	20.37	Q	
13	Marcin Urbaś	Poland	1	8	5	+0.3	20.43		SB
14	Kim Collins	Saint Kitts and Nevis	2	4	3	+0.0	20.47	Q	
14	Tommi Hartonen	Finland	3	8	4	-0.2	20.47	Q	NR
16	Stéphan Buckland	Mauritius	4	3	4	+0.4	20.53	Q	
17	Joseph Batangdon	Cameroon	3	6	5	-0.2	20.55		
18	Koji Ito	Japan	2	5	4	+0.0	20.56	Q	SB
19	Dwight Thomas	Jamaica	2	8	5	+0.0	20.58		PB
20	Oumar Loum	Senegal	4	1	5	+0.4	20.60		
21	Geir Moen	Norway	1	7	6	+0.3	20.65		
22	Alessandro Cavallaro	Italy	3	1	6	-0.2	20.69		
23	Antoine Boussombo	Gabon	1	2	7	+0.3	20.71		
23	Anninos Marcoullides	Cyprus	4	8	6	+0.4	20.71		
25	Petko Yankov	Bulgaria	2	2	6	+0.0	20.75		
26	Venancio José	Spain	2	7	7	-0.0	20.79		
27	Marlon Devonish	Great Britain	4	7	7	+0.4	20.82		
28	Patrick Johnson	Australia	3	7	7	-0.2	20.87		
29	Uchenna Emedolu	Nigeria	2	1	8	+0.0	20.93		
30	Héber Viera	Uruguay	1	1	8	+0.3	20.97		
31	Renward Wells	Bahamas	3	2	8	-0.2	21.26		
—	Matt Shirvington	Australia	4	2		+0.4	DNS		

=== Semifinals ===
==== Semifinal 1 ====
Rank	Lane	Athlete	Nation	Reaction	Time	Notes
1	3	John Capel	United States	0.177	20.10	Q
2	6	Christian Malcolm	Great Britain	0.161	20.19	Q
3	8	Ato Boldon	Trinidad and Tobago	0.147	20.20	Q
4	5	Obadele Thompson	Barbados	0.199	20.21	Q
5	4	Christopher Williams	Jamaica	0.197	20.47	
6	4	Stéphan Buckland	Mauritius	0.197	20.56	
7	7	Francis Obikwelu	Nigeria	0.241	20.71	
8	2	Tommi Hartonen	Finland	0.170	20.88	
				Wind: −1.1 m/s		

==== Semifinal 2 ====
Rank	Lane	Athlete	Nation	Reaction	Time	Notes
1	5	Konstantinos Kenteris	Greece	0.200	20.20	Q
2	3	Darren Campbell	Great Britain	0.234	20.23	Q
3	7	Claudinei da Silva	Brazil	0.196	20.30	Q
4	4	Coby Miller	United States	0.174	20.45	Q
5	1	Kim Collins	Saint Kitts and Nevis	0.177	20.57	
6	6	Floyd Heard	United States	0.169	20.63	
7	8	Koji Ito	Japan	0.212	20.67	
8	2	Shingo Suetsugu	Japan	0.177	20.69	
				Wind: +0.3 m/s		

=== Final ===
Rank	Lane	Athlete	Nation	Reaction	Time	Notes
1st place, gold medalist(s)	5	Konstantinos Kenteris	Greece	0.163	20.09	NR
2nd place, silver medalist(s)	6	Darren Campbell	Great Britain	0.174	20.14	
3rd place, bronze medalist(s)	8	Ato Boldon	Trinidad and Tobago	0.163	20.20	
4	7	Obadele Thompson	Barbados	0.205	20.20	
5	3	Christian Malcolm	Great Britain	0.202	20.23	
6	1	Claudinei da Silva	Brazil	0.192	20.28	
7	2	Coby Miller	United States	0.185	20.35	
8	4	John Capel	United States	0.348	20.49	
				Wind: −0.6 m/s		
