= Panagiotis Sarris =

Greek sprinter

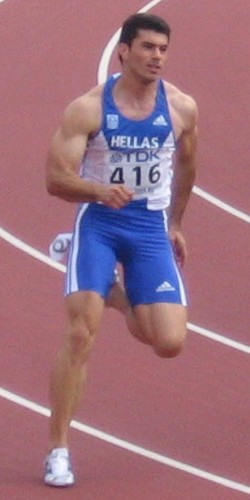
- Panagiotis Sarris in Helsinki, 2005

Personal information
- Born: 14 September 1975 (age 50)

Sport
- Country: Greece
- Sport: Athletics
- Events: 200m, 100m ,400m

Achievements and titles
- Personal bests: 20.48 sec, 10.17 sec, 46.37 sec (45.08 sec 3rd leg relay WC 2003)
Medal record
Mediterranean Games
Bronze medal – third place	2001 Rades	200 metres

Panagiotis Sarris (born 14 September 1975) is a retired Greek sprinter who specialized in the 200 metres.

He won the bronze medal at the 2001 Mediterranean Games and finished eighth in 4 x 100 m relay at the 2006 IAAF World Cup. He also competed at the 2004 Olympic Games, the World Championships in 1997 (4x400m), 1999 (200-4x400m), 2003 (200-4x400m 6th) and 2005 (200m), without reaching the final and the European Championships in 1998 (200-4x400m), 2002(100m) and 2006 (200m).

Finished sixth in 4x400 m relay at the 2003 World Championship (45.08 sec ) and seventh in 200 m at the 1999 World University Games.Competed at the Mediterranean Games in 1997, 2001, 2009.

His personal best time in the 200 metres is 20.48 seconds, achieved in July 2002 in Rethimno. In the 100 metres his personal best time is 10.17 seconds, achieved in July 2002 in Rethimno and in the 400 metres 46.37 seconds, achieved in July 2003 in Athens.

== Honours ==
Year	Competition	Venue	Position	Event	Notes
Representing Greece
1994	World Junior Championships	Lisbon, Portugal	18th (qf)	400m	48.17
1994	World Junior Championships	Lisbon, Portugal	12th (h)	4×400m relay	3:12.51
1997	European U23 Championships	Turku, Finland	15th (h)	200m	21.35 w (wind: 3.7 m/s)
1997	European U23 Championships	Turku, Finland	10th (h)	4x100 m relay	41.47
1997	World Championships	Athens, Greece	15th	4 x 400 m relay	3.05.43
1998	European Championships	Budapest, Hungary	9th (sf)	4 x 400 m relay	3:06.48 SB
1999	Universiade	Palma de Mallorca, Spain	7th	200 m	21.08
1999	World Championships	Seville, Spain	18th (sf)	200 m	20.65
2001	Mediterranean Games	Rades, Tunisia	3rd	200 m	20.72
2003	World Championships	Paris, France	6th	4 x 400 m relay	3:02.56
2004	Olympic Games	Athens, Greece	26th (qf)	200 m	20.92
2004	Olympic Games	Athens, Greece	12th (sf)	4 x 400 m relay	3:04.27 SB
2005	European Indoor Championships	Madrid, Spain	13th (sf)	200 m	21.53
2006	European Championships	Gothenburg, Sweden	20th (h)	200 m	21.04
2009	Mediterranean Games	Pescara, Italy	10th (sf)	100 m	10.55
2009	Mediterranean Games	Pescara, Italy	4th	4 x 100 m relay	40.80
