= Michael McDonald (runner) =

Jamaican athlete (born 1975)

Personal information
- Born: Michael L. McDonald; 17 March 1975 (age 51) Saint Mary Parish, Jamaica
Medal record
Men's Athletics
Representing Jamaica
Olympic Games
Silver medal – second place	2000 Sydney	4 × 400 m relay
Bronze medal – third place	1996 Atlanta	4 × 400 m relay
World Championships
Silver medal – second place	1995 Gothenburg	4 × 400 m relay
Silver medal – second place	1999 Sevilla	4 × 400 m relay
Bronze medal – third place	1997 Athens	4 × 400 m relay
Commonwealth Games
Gold medal – first place	1998 Kuala Lumpur	4 × 400 m relay
Pan American Games
Gold medal – first place	1999 Winnipeg	4 × 400 m relay
Silver medal – second place	1995 Mar del Plata	4 × 400 m relay
CAC Championships
Gold medal – first place	1999 Bridgetown	400 m
Silver medal – second place	1999 Bridgetown	4 × 400 m relay
Central American and Caribbean Games
Silver medal – second place	1998 Maracaibo	4 × 400 m relay
Silver medal – second place	2002 San Salvador	4 × 400 m relay
CAC Junior Championships (U20)
Gold medal – first place	1994 Port of Spain	400 m
CARIFTA Games Junior (U20)
Gold medal – first place	1993 Fort-de-France	800 m
Gold medal – first place	1993 Fort-de-France	4 × 400 m relay
Gold medal – first place	1994 Bridgetown	400 m
Gold medal – first place	1994 Bridgetown	4 × 400 m relay
CARIFTA Games Youth (U17)
Gold medal – first place	1991 Port of Spain	800 m
Bronze medal – third place	1991 Port of Spain	1500 m

Michael L. McDonald (born 17 March 1975 in Saint Mary Parish, Jamaica) is a Jamaican runner who competed mainly in the 400 metres.

== Career ==
He competed for Jamaica at the 1996 Summer Olympics held in Atlanta, United States where he won the bronze medal in the men's 4 × 400 metres relay with his teammates Roxbert Martin, Greg Haughton and Davian Clarke.

A brother of Beverly McDonald, he won a gold medal at the 1998 Commonwealth Games in the 4 × 400 metres relay event and broke the Commonwealth Games record.

== Notes ==
Both at the 1997 World Championships in Athletics held in Athens, Greece, and at the 1999 World Championships in Athletics held in Sevilla, Spain, the Jamaica 4 × 400 team won originally the bronze medal, but the USA 4 × 400 team, which originally finished first in 4 × 400 m relay, was disqualified in 2008 due to Antonio Pettigrew confession of using human growth hormone and EPO between 1997 and 2003. Therefore, the silver medal was later awarded to the team from Jamaica.

== International competitions ==
Year	Competition	Venue	Position	Event	Notes
Representing Jamaica
1991	CARIFTA Games (U-17)	Port of Spain, Trinidad and Tobago	1st	800 m	1:56.02
1991	CARIFTA Games (U-17)	Port of Spain, Trinidad and Tobago	3rd	1500 m	4:20.8
1992	CARIFTA Games (U-20)	Nassau, Bahamas	6th	800 m	1:58.59
1993	CARIFTA Games (U-20)	Fort-de-France, Martinique	1st	800 m	1:51.43
1993	CARIFTA Games (U-20)	Fort-de-France, Martinique	1st	4 × 400 m relay	3:10.26
1993	Central American and Caribbean Games	Maracaibo, Venezuela	2nd	4 × 400 m relay	3:03.26
1994	CARIFTA Games (U-20)	Bridgetown, Barbados	4th	200 m	21.75
1994	CARIFTA Games (U-20)	Bridgetown, Barbados	1st	400 m	47.02
1994	CARIFTA Games (U-20)	Bridgetown, Barbados	1st	4 × 400 m relay	3:09.47
1994	Central American and Caribbean Junior Championships (U-20)	Port of Spain, Trinidad and Tobago	1st	400 m	46.2
1994	World Junior Championships	Lisbon, Portugal	1st	400 m	45.83
1994	World Junior Championships	Lisbon, Portugal	2nd	4 × 400 m relay	3:04.12
1995	Pan American Games	Mar del Plata, Argentina	8th	400 m	46.21
1995	Pan American Games	Mar del Plata, Argentina	2nd	4 × 400 m relay	3:02.11
1995	World Championships	Gothenburg, Sweden	2nd	4 × 400 m relay	2:59.88
1996	Olympic Games	Atlanta, United States	12th (sf)	400 m	45.48
1996	Olympic Games	Atlanta, United States	3rd	4 × 400 m relay	2:59.42
1997	World Championships	Athens, Greece	13th (sf)	400 m	45.74
1997	World Championships	Athens, Greece	2nd	4 × 400 m relay	2:56.75 NR
1998	Central American and Caribbean Games	Maracaibo, Venezuela	2nd	4 × 400 m relay	3:03.26
1998	Commonwealth Games	Kuala Lumpur, Malaysia	1st	4 × 400 m relay	2:59.03 GR
1999	Central American and Caribbean Championships	Bridgetown, Barbados	1st	400 m	45.21
1999	Central American and Caribbean Championships	Bridgetown, Barbados	2nd	4 × 400 m relay	3:03.82
1999	Pan American Games	Winnipeg, Canada	1st	4 × 400 m relay	2:57.97 GR
1999	World Championships	Seville, Spain	22nd (qf)	400 m	45.87
1999	World Championships	Seville, Spain	2nd	4 × 400 m relay	2:59.34
2000	Olympic Games	Sydney, Australia	3rd	4 × 400 m relay	3:04.85 (h)
2001	World Championships	Edmonton, Canada	3rd (h)	400 m	45.02^{1}
2002	Central American and Caribbean Games	San Salvador, El Salvador	2nd	4 × 400 m relay	3:05.40

^{1}Did not finish in the semifinals
