= Ramon Clay =

American sprinter (born 1975)

Ramon Clay (born June 29, 1975) is a retired American sprinter who specialized in the 200 metres.

He was born in Memphis, Tennessee.

As a senior at Nashville's Hunters Lane High School, despite having the flu during the State Championships, Clay was the champion in the 100, 200, and 400 meters. His personal bests in high school were hand timed at 10.2 in the 100m, 20.9 in the 200m, and 46.4 in the 400m, before the State used automatic timing. His best 200 and 400 times were recorded a mere 20 minutes apart at the Banner Relays in Nashville.

He attended Norfolk State University.

At the 1996 Olympic Trials, he just missed representing the USA at the 1996 Olympics in the 200 meters, finishing 4th in a race where a world record time (19.66 seconds) was set by Michael Johnson. His time in the race was 20.08, just .04 seconds behind 3rd-place finisher and former American record holder Michael Marsh.

He won a silver medal (in the 400 meters) at the 1994 World Junior Championships, finished fourth at the 2002 IAAF World Cup and seventh at the 2003 IAAF World Athletics Final. He became US Outdoor champion in 2002, and US Indoor champion in 1998. He also competed at the 2001 World Championships without reaching the final.

His personal best times were 20.05 seconds in the 200 meters, achieved in July 2001 in Lausanne; 10.21 seconds in the 100 meters, achieved in May 2003 in Sainte Anne; and 6.56 seconds in the 60 meters (indoor), achieved in February 2003 in Liévin.

On October 22, 2010 the United States Anti-Doping Agency determined that Clay was guilty of using steroids and hormones officially dating back to January 1, 2000. Clay was implicated as part of the BALCO scandal. His results subsequent to that date were disqualified and even though he is retired, he also received a two-year ban from the sport.

== Achievements ==
Year	Competition	Venue	Position	Event	Notes
Representing the United States
1994	World Junior Championships	Lisbon, Portugal	2nd	400m	46.13
1994	World Junior Championships	Lisbon, Portugal	1st	4 × 400 m relay	3:03.32
1996	1996 US Olympic Trials	Atlanta, Georgia	4th	200m	
