= Mohamed Mahbub Alam =

Bangladeshi sprinter

Personal information
- Nationality: Bangladeshi
- Born: 1 October 1972
- Died: 4 December 2010 (aged 38) Kanchpur, Narayanganj District, Bangladesh

Sport
- Sport: Sprinting
- Event: 200 metres

Mohamed Mahbub Alam (1 October 1972 – 4 December 2010) was a Bangladeshi sprinter. In men's 200 metres sprint, he won gold in the 1995 South Asian Games in Madras and silver in the 1999 South Asian Games in Kathmandu. He also earned the national record of 10.54 seconds in the 100 metres sprint which 1996 Bangladesh National Athletics Championship. He received 2013 Bangladesh National Sports Award in the athletics category.

== Career ==
Alam competed in the men's 200 metres at the 2000 Summer Olympics but failed to finish the race. Alam later served as a member of the executive committee of Bangladesh Athletics Federation (BAF).
