= Christian Malcolm =

Welsh sprinter (born 1979)

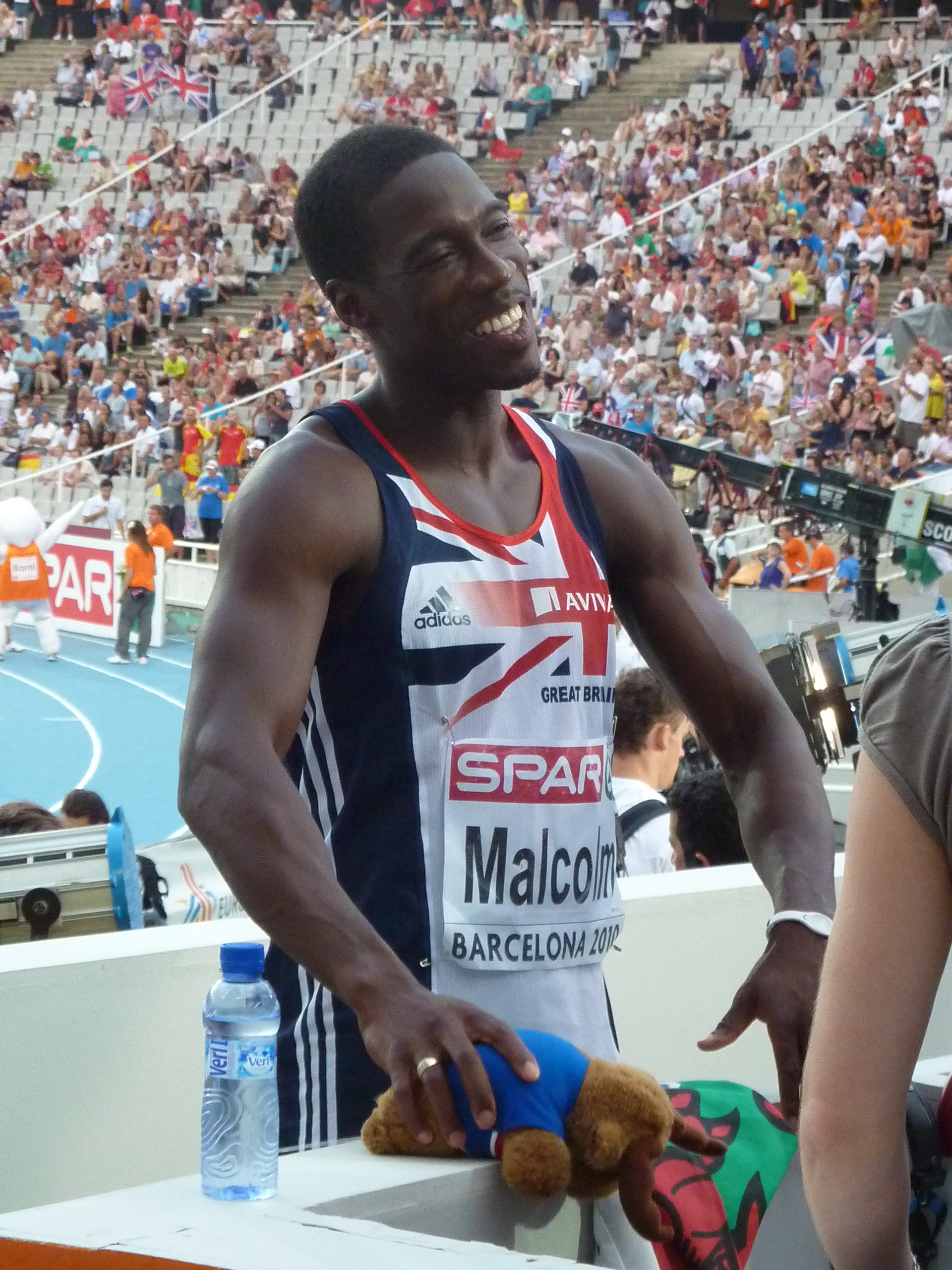
- Malcolm in Barcelona 2010

Personal information
- Nationality: British (Welsh)
- Born: 3 June 1979 (age 47) Newport, Wales
- Height: 1.75 m (5 ft 9 in)
- Weight: 66 kg (146 lb)

Sport
- Sport: Athletics
- Event: Sprints
- Club: Cardiff AAC
Medal record
Representing Great Britain
World Championships
Bronze medal – third place	2005 Helsinki	4 × 100 m relay
Bronze medal – third place	2007 Osaka	4 × 100 m relay
World Indoor Championships
Silver medal – second place	2001 Lisbon	200 m
European Championships
Silver medal – second place	2010 Barcelona	200 m
World Junior Championships
Gold medal – first place	1998 Annecy	100 m
Gold medal – first place	1998 Annecy	200 m
Representing Wales
Commonwealth Games
Silver medal – second place	1998 Kuala Lumpur	200 m
Bronze medal – third place	2010 Delhi	200 m

Christian Sean Malcolm (born 3 June 1979) is a retired track and field athlete from Wales, who specialised in the 200 metres. In 2020 he was appointed Head Coach of the British Athletics Olympic Programme.

== Early life ==
Malcolm was born and was brought up in Newport, where he still lives. He is of Jamaican descent.

When Malcolm was 15 years old, he was offered a contract by English football club Nottingham Forest, having had trials earlier with them and Queens Park Rangers as a young forward. In a 1998 interview, Malcolm claimed he chose athletics as in his view it is a "friendlier sport and you're not as likely to get kicked around the pitch".

== Education ==
Malcolm was educated at two state schools in Newport: Eveswell Primary School and Hartridge High School.

== Life and career ==
Malcolm won the title of World Junior Athlete of the Year in 1998 and at the 1998 World Junior Championships, he won the 100 m in 10.12 seconds and the 200 m in 20.44 seconds, becoming the second sprinter to achieve this double at the Junior Worlds, after Ato Boldon. His winning time in the 100 m set a new Welsh senior and British junior record, and his winning margin of 0.22 seconds was the largest in the history of the 100 m at the Junior Worlds at the time. At that year's Commonwealth Games, his 20.29 for the silver medal was a European Junior and Welsh senior record.

Malcolm took the 2000 European Indoor gold medal in 20.54, for a Welsh Indoor record. Outdoors he led off for the sprint relay team on the first day and ran a season's best of 20.45 to win the 200 m on the second day at the European Cup. He went on to 2nd at the AAAs and to excel at the 2000 Olympics to take fifth place at 200 m in 20.23.

In 2001, Malcolm took the World Indoor silver medal. Outdoors he was 3rd at 100 m and 2nd at 200 m at the AAAs and at the World Championships ran eight races to make the finals at both 100 m and 200 m, finishing 6th and 5th respectively. He also competed as part of the relay team, however, the baton was dropped in the heats. He set two new Welsh records at the Worlds, clocking 10.11 in the 100 m final and 20.08 in the semi-finals of the 200 m. The 200 m final was one of the closest finishes in a major sprint event in history, with Malcolm's final time of 20.22 being just two hundredths of a second down on second, third and fourth placed athletes Christopher Williams, Shawn Crawford and Kim Collins.

After four-second places at the AAAs, Malcolm finally won the 200 m in 2005 in a narrow decision over Marlon Devonish and was also 3rd at 100 m. He surprised even himself with a brilliant win at the European Cup in 20.15, his best time for five years.

Malcolm represented Great Britain at the 2008 Summer Olympics in Beijing. He competed at the 200 metres and placed second in his first round heat after Brian Dzingai in a time of 20.42 seconds. He improved his time in the second round to 20.30 seconds and placed fourth in his race, normally not enough to advance to the semi-finals, but his time was among the four fastest losing times and he qualified after all. With 20.25 in his semi-final race he even managed to qualify for the final, finishing fourth in his race, eliminating Paul Hession and Christopher Williams. In the final he came in seventh at 20.40 seconds, but as a result of the disqualifications of Churandy Martina (second) and Wallace Spearmon (third) he moved up to the fifth place overall.

At the 2010 Commonwealth Games in Delhi, Malcolm, representing Wales, was one of the favourites to win the men's 200 m, and took the bronze medal.

Malcolm retired from competition in 2014 after failing to be selected to the Welsh team for that year's Commonwealth Games in Glasgow due to injury. He competed at four Commonwealth Games in total, sharing the record for most appearances at the Games by a Welsh track and field athlete with Ron Jones, Steve Jones, Colin Jackson and Berwyn Price. He also appeared at four Olympics, and shares the record for most appearances by a Welsh track and field athlete at the Olympics with Jackson. In addition Malcolm won nine senior sprint titles at the Welsh national championships.

After retirement, he became a non-executive director of Welsh Athletics, and subsequently served as British Athletics' technical lead for sprint relays from 2015 to 2019, and guided the GB men's and women's 4 × 100 m relay squads to a gold and a silver medal respectively at the 2017 World Athletics Championships on home ground in London, an achievement for which he was jointly awarded that year's BBC Sports Personality of the Year Coach Award alongside colleagues Stephen Maguire and Benke Blomkvist. He also served as a performance coach with the Federation of Disability Sport Wales for three years, coaching Jordan Howe to a silver medal in the T35 100 m and guiding Rhys Jones to a career-best fourth in the T37 100 m at the 2017 World Para Athletics Championships, also held in London. In January 2019 he joined Athletics Australia as Head of Performance and Coaching. On 3 September 2020, British Athletics announced that Malcolm had been appointed Head Coach of the British Athletics Olympic Programme.

== International competitions ==
Year	Competition	Venue	Position	Event	Notes
Representing Great Britain and Wales
1996	World Junior Championships	Sydney, Australia	11th (sf)	200 m	21.52
1996	World Junior Championships	Sydney, Australia	7th	4 × 100 m relay	40.32
1997	European Junior Championships	Ljubljana, Slovenia	2nd	100 m	10.24
1997	European Junior Championships	Ljubljana, Slovenia	1st	200 m	20.51
1997	European Junior Championships	Ljubljana, Slovenia	1st	4 × 100 m relay	39.62
1998	World Junior Championships	Annecy, France	1st	100 m	10.12
1998	World Junior Championships	Annecy, France	1st	200 m	20.44
1998	World Junior Championships	Annecy, France	–	4 × 100 m relay	DQ
1998	Commonwealth Games	Kuala Lumpur, Malaysia	11th (sf)	100 m	10.33
1998	Commonwealth Games	Kuala Lumpur, Malaysia	2nd	200 m	20.29
1998	Commonwealth Games	Kuala Lumpur, Malaysia	4th	4 × 100 m relay	38.73
1999	European U23 Championships	Gothenburg, Sweden	3rd	100 m	10.28 (w)
1999	European U23 Championships	Gothenburg, Sweden	2nd	200 m	20.47
1999	European U23 Championships	Gothenburg, Sweden	1st	4 × 100 m relay	38.96
2000	European Indoor Championships	Ghent, Belgium	1st	200 m	20.54
2000	Olympic Games	Sydney, Australia	5th	200 m	20.23
2001	World Indoor Championships	Lisbon, Portugal	24th (h)	60 m	6.77
2001	World Indoor Championships	Lisbon, Portugal	2nd	200 m	20.76
2001	World Championships	Edmonton, Canada	6th	100 m	10.11
2001	World Championships	Edmonton, Canada	5th	200 m	20.22
2001	World Championships	Edmonton, Canada	–	4 × 100 m relay	DNF
2001	Goodwill Games	Brisbane, Australia	5th	200 m	20.77
2001	Goodwill Games	Brisbane, Australia	1st	4 × 100 m relay	38.71
2002	European Indoor Championships	Vienna, Austria	2nd	200 m	20.65
2002	Commonwealth Games	Manchester, United Kingdom	8th	200 m	20.39
2002	Commonwealth Games	Manchester, United Kingdom	8th	4 × 100 m relay	39.73
2002	European Championships	Munich, Germany	4th	200 m	20.30
2002	European Championships	Munich, Germany	–	4 × 100 m relay	DQ
2002	World Cup	Madrid, Spain	6th	4 × 100 m relay	39.23
2003	World Championships	Paris, France	8th (sf)	200 m	20.43
2003	World Championships	Paris, France	–	4 × 100 m relay	DQ
2004	Olympic Games	Athens, Greece	12th (sf)	200 m	20.77
2005	World Championships	Helsinki, Finland	15th (sf)	200 m	21.09
2005	World Championships	Helsinki, Finland	3rd	4 × 100 m relay	38.27
2006	Commonwealth Games	Melbourne, Australia	59th (h)	100 m	32.72
2007	World Championships	Osaka, Japan	3rd	4 × 100 m relay	37.90
2008	Olympic Games	Beijing, China	5th	200 m	20.40
2010	European Championships	Barcelona, Spain	2nd	200 m	20.38
2010	Continental Cup	Split, Croatia	4th	200 m	20.75^{1}
2010	Commonwealth Games	Delhi, India	2nd	200 m	20.52
2011	World Championships	Daegu, South Korea	15th (sf)	200 m	20.88
2011	World Championships	Daegu, South Korea	4th (h)	4 × 100 m relay	38.29^{2}
2012	European Championships	Helsinki, Finland	1st (h)	4 × 100 m relay	38.98^{2}
2012	Olympic Games	London, Great Britain	11th (sf)	200 m	20.51
2012	Olympic Games	London, Great Britain	4 × 100 m relay	DQ	

^{1}Representing Europe
^{2}Did not finish in the final
