= 2000 European Athletics Indoor Championships – Men's 200 metres =

The men's 200 metres event at the 2000 European Athletics Indoor Championships was held on February 25–26.

== Medalists ==
| Gold | Silver | Bronze |
|---|---|---|
| Christian Malcolm; Great Britain | Patrick Stevens; Belgium | Julian Golding; Great Britain |

== Results ==
=== Heats ===
First 2 of each heat (Q) and the next 3 fastest (q) qualified for the semifinals.

| Rank | Heat | Name | Nationality | Time | Notes |
|---|---|---|---|---|---|
| 1 | 3 | Anninos Marcoullides | Cyprus | 20.81 | Q, SB |
| 2 | 6 | Christian Malcolm | Great Britain | 20.85 | Q |
| 3 | 1 | Patrick Stevens | Belgium | 20.87 | Q |
| 4 | 5 | Konstantinos Kenteris | Greece | 20.93 | Q |
| 5 | 6 | Roland Németh | Hungary | 20.95 | Q, PB |
| 6 | 2 | Christophe Cheval | France | 20.96 | Q |
| 6 | 3 | Julian Golding | Great Britain | 20.96 | Q |
| 8 | 5 | Marc Foucan | France | 21.00 | Q |
| 9 | 4 | Petko Yankov | Bulgaria | 21.01 | Q |
| 10 | 4 | Serhiy Osovych | Ukraine | 21.06 | Q |
| 11 | 6 | Holger Blume | Germany | 21.19 | q |
| 12 | 6 | John Ertzgaard | Norway | 21.19 | q |
| 13 | 2 | Ronny Ostwald | Germany | 21.20 | Q |
| 14 | 4 | Timothy Benjamin | Great Britain | 21.27 | q |
| 15 | 2 | Christos Magos | Greece | 21.30 | |
| 16 | 5 | Patrick van Balkom | Netherlands | 21.31 | |
| 17 | 4 | Ryszard Pilarczyk | Poland | 21.45 | |
| 18 | 2 | Prodromos Katsantonis | Greece | 21.51 | |
| 19 | 1 | Maurizio Checcucci | Italy | 21.60 | Q |
| 20 | 1 | Resat Oguz | Turkey | 21.68 | |
| 20 | 5 | Marco Torrieri | Italy | 21.68 | |
| 22 | 3 | Cédric Gold-Dalg | France | 21.74 | |
| 23 | 1 | Valeriy Kirdyashev | Russia | 21.92 | |
| | 1 | Marcin Urbaś | Poland | DNF | |
| | 3 | Erik Wymeersch | Belgium | DNS | |

=== Semifinals ===
First 2 of each semifinals qualified directly (Q) for the final.

| Rank | Heat | Name | Nationality | Time | Notes |
|---|---|---|---|---|---|
| 1 | 3 | Patrick Stevens | Belgium | 20.66 | Q, =NR |
| 2 | 1 | Christian Malcolm | Great Britain | 20.77 | Q |
| 2 | 2 | Anninos Marcoullides | Cyprus | 20.77 | Q, SB |
| 4 | 2 | Julian Golding | Great Britain | 20.87 | Q |
| 5 | 1 | Christophe Cheval | France | 20.94 | Q |
| 5 | 3 | Konstantinos Kenteris | Greece | 20.94 | Q |
| 7 | 2 | Petko Yankov | Bulgaria | 20.98 | |
| 8 | 3 | Marc Foucan | France | 21.19 | |
| 9 | 3 | Serhiy Osovych | Ukraine | 21.27 | |
| 10 | 1 | Ronny Ostwald | Germany | 21.32 | |
| 11 | 3 | Timothy Benjamin | Great Britain | 21.54 | |
| 12 | 2 | Holger Blume | Germany | 21.63 | |
| 13 | 2 | Maurizio Checcucci | Italy | 21.64 | |
| | 1 | Roland Németh | Hungary | DQ | |
| | 1 | John Ertzgaard | Norway | DNS | |

=== Final ===
| Rank | Name | Nationality | Reaction | Time | Notes |
|---|---|---|---|---|---|
| 1st place, gold medalist(s) | Christian Malcolm | Great Britain | 0.171 | 20.54 | PB |
| 2nd place, silver medalist(s) | Patrick Stevens | Belgium | 0.158 | 20.70 | |
| 3rd place, bronze medalist(s) | Julian Golding | Great Britain | 0.161 | 21.02 | |
| 4 | Christophe Cheval | France | 0.148 | 21.37 | |
| 5 | Konstantinos Kenteris | Greece | 0.192 | 21.79 | |
| | Anninos Marcoullides | Cyprus | 0.135 | DNF | |
