= N'Kosie Barnes =

Antigua and Barbuda sprinter

N'Kosie Barnes (born 17 December 1974) is a former sprinter from Antigua and Barbuda who competed in the 1996 Summer Olympics and the 2000 Summer Olympics. In 1996, he was a part of the Antiguan men's 4 × 400 m relay that did not advance from their heat. In 2000, he only participated in the men's 200 m, where he finished with his personal best time of 21.82, not enough to advance past the first round.
