= 1998 World Junior Championships in Athletics – Men's 200 metres =

The men's 200 metres event at the 1998 World Junior Championships in Athletics was held in Annecy, France, at Parc des Sports on 31 July and 1 August.

== Medalists ==
| Gold | Christian Malcolm; United Kingdom |
| Silver | Jairo Duzant; Netherlands Antilles |
| Bronze | Russell Frye; United States |

== Results ==
=== Final ===
1 August
Wind: -0.2 m/s

| Rank | Name | Nationality | Time | Notes |
|---|---|---|---|---|
| 1st place, gold medalist(s) | Christian Malcolm | United Kingdom | 20.44 | |
| 2nd place, silver medalist(s) | Jairo Duzant | Netherlands Antilles | 20.92 | |
| 3rd place, bronze medalist(s) | Russell Frye | United States | 20.94 | |
| 4 | Steve Slowly | Jamaica | 20.99 | |
| 5 | Scott Thom | Australia | 21.00 | |
| 6 | Roy Bailey | Jamaica | 21.02 | |
| 7 | Massimiliano Donati | Italy | 21.08 | |
| 8 | Stefan Holz | Germany | 21.39 | |

=== Semifinals ===
1 August

==== Semifinal 1 ====
Wind: -0.7 m/s

| Rank | Name | Nationality | Time | Notes |
|---|---|---|---|---|
| 1 | Russell Frye | United States | 20.92 | Q |
| 2 | Jairo Duzant | Netherlands Antilles | 21.01 | Q |
| 3 | Roy Bailey | Jamaica | 21.16 | Q |
| 4 | Stefan Holz | Germany | 21.29 | Q |
| 5 | Wynand Dempers | South Africa | 21.38 | |
| 6 | Tim Benjamin | United Kingdom | 21.59 | |
| 7 | Raphael de Oliveira | Brazil | 21.88 | |
| 8 | Sherwin Vries | Namibia | 21.88 | |

==== Semifinal 2 ====
Wind: +1.0 m/s

| Rank | Name | Nationality | Time | Notes |
|---|---|---|---|---|
| 1 | Christian Malcolm | United Kingdom | 20.62 | Q |
| 2 | Massimiliano Donati | Italy | 20.97 | Q |
| 3 | Scott Thom | Australia | 21.05 | Q |
| 4 | Steve Slowly | Jamaica | 21.07 | Q |
| 5 | Kevin Baker | United States | 21.24 | |
| 6 | Benjamin Potter | New Zealand | 21.32 | |
| 7 | Bradley Agnew | South Africa | 21.45 | |
| 8 | Hirofumi Nakagawa | Japan | 21.89 | |

=== Quarterfinals ===
31 July

==== Quarterfinal 1 ====
Wind: -0.1 m/s

| Rank | Name | Nationality | Time | Notes |
|---|---|---|---|---|
| 1 | Steve Slowly | Jamaica | 21.00 | Q |
| 2 | Scott Thom | Australia | 21.14 | Q |
| 3 | Kevin Baker | United States | 21.53 | Q |
| 4 | Raphael de Oliveira | Brazil | 21.54 | Q |
| 5 | Jeremy Bobe | France | 21.56 | |
| 6 | Attila Farkas | Hungary | 21.57 | |
| 7 | Heber Viera | Uruguay | 21.58 | |
| | José Luis Herrera | Colombia | DNS | |

==== Quarterfinal 2 ====
Wind: 0.0 m/s

| Rank | Name | Nationality | Time | Notes |
|---|---|---|---|---|
| 1 | Russell Frye | United States | 20.79 | Q |
| 2 | Roy Bailey | Jamaica | 21.07 | Q |
| 3 | Tim Benjamin | United Kingdom | 21.22 | Q |
| 4 | Sherwin Vries | Namibia | 21.31 | Q |
| 5 | William To Wai Lok | Hong Kong | 21.81 | |
| 6 | Julien Arame | France | 21.87 | |
| 7 | Kenji Nara | Japan | 22.19 | |
| | Matthias Mertens | Germany | DQ | IAAF rule 163.3 |

==== Quarterfinal 3 ====
Wind: -0.2 m/s

| Rank | Name | Nationality | Time | Notes |
|---|---|---|---|---|
| 1 | Christian Malcolm | United Kingdom | 20.85 | Q |
| 2 | Benjamin Potter | New Zealand | 21.26 | Q |
| 3 | Hirofumi Nakagawa | Japan | 21.31 | Q |
| 4 | Wynand Dempers | South Africa | 21.36 | Q |
| 5 | Anastasios Goúsis | Greece | 21.48 | |
| 6 | Alexander Lakhanpal | Sweden | 21.78 | |
| 7 | Alejandro Olivan | Spain | 21.79 | |
| 8 | Stephen Hadfield | Australia | 21.88 | |

==== Quarterfinal 4 ====
Wind: -0.9 m/s

| Rank | Name | Nationality | Time | Notes |
|---|---|---|---|---|
| 1 | Jairo Duzant | Netherlands Antilles | 21.07 | Q |
| 2 | Stefan Holz | Germany | 21.27 | Q |
| 3 | Massimiliano Donati | Italy | 21.29 | Q |
| 4 | Bradley Agnew | South Africa | 21.38 | Q |
| 5 | Dallas Roberts | New Zealand | 21.40 | |
| 6 | Uros Zver | Slovenia | 21.66 | |
| 7 | Helly Ollarves | Venezuela | 21.76 | |
| 8 | Ousman Jatta | Gambia | 22.51 | |

=== Heats ===
31 July

==== Heat 1 ====
Wind: +0.6 m/s

| Rank | Name | Nationality | Time | Notes |
|---|---|---|---|---|
| 1 | Roy Bailey | Jamaica | 21.32 | Q |
| 2 | Hirofumi Nakagawa | Japan | 21.32 | Q |
| 3 | Attila Farkas | Hungary | 21.59 | Q |
| 4 | William To Wai Lok | Hong Kong | 21.77 | Q |
| 5 | Nelson Lucas | Seychelles | 22.14 | |
| 6 | Dermot Rawlins | Saint Kitts and Nevis | 22.46 | |
| | Marco Cuneo | Italy | DQ | IAAF rule 163.3 |

==== Heat 2 ====
Wind: -0.9 m/s

| Rank | Name | Nationality | Time | Notes |
|---|---|---|---|---|
| 1 | Jairo Duzant | Netherlands Antilles | 21.25 | Q |
| 2 | Stefan Holz | Germany | 21.33 | Q |
| 3 | Dallas Roberts | New Zealand | 21.52 | Q |
| 4 | Uros Zver | Slovenia | 21.57 | Q |
| 5 | Heber Viera | Uruguay | 21.59 | q |
| 6 | Stephen Hadfield | Australia | 21.79 | q |
| 7 | Saula Roko | Fiji | 22.24 | |
| 8 | Charles Shaw | Liberia | 23.41 | |

==== Heat 3 ====
Wind: -0.2 m/s

| Rank | Name | Nationality | Time | Notes |
|---|---|---|---|---|
| 1 | Scott Thom | Australia | 21.23 | Q |
| 2 | Steve Slowly | Jamaica | 21.34 | Q |
| 3 | Julien Arame | France | 21.51 | Q |
| 4 | Matthias Mertens | Germany | 21.56 | Q |
| 5 | Kenji Nara | Japan | 21.92 | q |
| 6 | Rudy Colabella | Belgium | 21.97 | |
| 7 | Gary Webb | Norfolk Island | 23.61 | |
| 8 | Papy Stone Seke Moundele | Congo | 23.66 | |

==== Heat 4 ====
Wind: +0.4 m/s

| Rank | Name | Nationality | Time | Notes |
|---|---|---|---|---|
| 1 | Massimiliano Donati | Italy | 21.10 | Q |
| 2 | Wynand Dempers | South Africa | 21.25 | Q |
| 3 | Benjamin Potter | New Zealand | 21.26 | Q |
| 4 | José Luis Herrera | Colombia | 22.15 | Q |
| 5 | Sean Lambert | Grenada | 22.51 | |
| 6 | Xu Zizhou | China | 22.69 | |
| 7 | Bashir Al-Khewani | Yemen | 23.80 | |
| 8 | Philam Garcia | Guam | 25.11 | |

==== Heat 5 ====
Wind: +0.1 m/s

| Rank | Name | Nationality | Time | Notes |
|---|---|---|---|---|
| 1 | Russell Frye | United States | 20.97 | Q |
| 2 | Bradley Agnew | South Africa | 21.43 | Q |
| 3 | Raphael de Oliveira | Brazil | 21.58 | Q |
| 4 | Alejandro Olivan | Spain | 21.69 | Q |
| 5 | Helly Ollarves | Venezuela | 21.76 | q |
| 6 | Thomas Scheidl | Austria | 22.11 | |
| 7 | Ernesto Elo | Equatorial Guinea | 23.80 | |

==== Heat 6 ====
Wind: +0.7 m/s

| Rank | Name | Nationality | Time | Notes |
|---|---|---|---|---|
| 1 | Christian Malcolm | United Kingdom | 20.73 | Q |
| 2 | Jeremy Bobe | France | 21.36 | Q |
| 3 | Alexander Lakhanpal | Sweden | 21.44 | Q |
| 4 | Ousman Jatta | Gambia | 21.89 | Q |
| 5 | Ahmed Torkhani | Tunisia | 21.94 | |
| 6 | Piotr Berestiuk | Poland | 22.00 | |
| 7 | Robert Mugagga | Uganda | 22.34 | |

==== Heat 7 ====
Wind: +1.6 m/s

| Rank | Name | Nationality | Time | Notes |
|---|---|---|---|---|
| 1 | Kevin Baker | United States | 21.16 | Q |
| 2 | Tim Benjamin | United Kingdom | 21.19 | Q |
| 3 | Sherwin Vries | Namibia | 21.25 | Q |
| 4 | Anastasios Goúsis | Greece | 21.61 | Q |
| 5 | Isaac Yaya | Tahiti | 22.64 | |
| | Rodney Pitts | U.S. Virgin Islands | DQ | IAAF rule 163.3 |

== Participation ==
According to an unofficial count, 51 athletes from 41 countries participated in the event.

- Australia (2)
- Austria (1)
- Belgium (1)
- Brazil (1)
- China (1)
- Colombia (1)
- Congo (1)
- Equatorial Guinea (1)
- Fiji (1)
- France (2)
- Gambia (1)
- Germany (2)
- Greece (1)
- Grenada (1)
- Guam (1)
- Hong Kong (1)
- Hungary (1)
- Italy (2)
- Jamaica (2)
- Japan (2)
- Liberia (1)
- Namibia (1)
- Netherlands Antilles (1)
- New Zealand (2)
- Norfolk Island (1)
- Poland (1)
- Saint Kitts and Nevis (1)
- Seychelles (1)
- Slovenia (1)
- South Africa (2)
- Spain (1)
- Sweden (1)
- Tahiti (1)
- Tunisia (1)
- Uganda (1)
- United Kingdom (2)
- United States (2)
- Uruguay (1)
- U.S. Virgin Islands (1)
- Venezuela (1)
- Yemen (1)
