= 1999 European Athletics U23 Championships – Men's 200 metres =

The men's 200 metres event at the 1999 European Athletics U23 Championships was held in Gothenburg, Sweden, at Ullevi on 30 and 31 July 1999.

== Medalists ==
| Gold | John Ertzgaard; Norway |
| Silver | Christian Malcolm; United Kingdom |
| Bronze | Stefan Holz; Germany |

== Results ==
=== Final ===
31 July
Wind: -0.6 m/s

| Rank | Name | Nationality | Time | Notes |
|---|---|---|---|---|
| 1st place, gold medalist(s) | John Ertzgaard | Norway | 20.47 | |
| 2nd place, silver medalist(s) | Christian Malcolm | United Kingdom | 20.47 | |
| 3rd place, bronze medalist(s) | Stefan Holz | Germany | 20.69 | |
| 4 | Anastasios Poulioglou | Greece | 20.83 | |
| 5 | John Stewart | United Kingdom | 20.84 | |
| 6 | Frédéric Krantz | France | 20.90 | |
| 7 | Christos Magos | Greece | 20.94 | |
| 8 | Graham Beasley | United Kingdom | 21.21 | |

=== Semifinals ===
31 July
Qualified: first 4 in each to the Final

==== Semifinal 1 ====
Wind: -0.2 m/s

| Rank | Name | Nationality | Time | Notes |
|---|---|---|---|---|
| 1 | Christian Malcolm | United Kingdom | 20.65 | Q |
| 2 | Stefan Holz | Germany | 20.77 | Q |
| 3 | Frédéric Krantz | France | 20.84 | Q |
| 4 | Anastasios Poulioglou | Greece | 20.94 | Q |
| 5 | Massimiliano Donati | Italy | 21.04 | |
| 6 | Aldo Tonazzi | Switzerland | 21.46 | |
| 7 | Stéphane Peccatus | France | 21.48 | |
| 8 | Thomas Mellin-Olsen | Norway | 21.79 | |

==== Semifinal 2 ====
Wind: -0.5 m/s

| Rank | Name | Nationality | Time | Notes |
|---|---|---|---|---|
| 1 | John Ertzgaard | Norway | 20.82 | Q |
| 2 | John Stewart | United Kingdom | 20.88 | Q |
| 3 | Christos Magos | Greece | 21.12 | Q |
| 4 | Graham Beasley | United Kingdom | 21.19 | Q |
| 5 | Erik Kringeland | Norway | 21.21 | |
| 6 | Mikael Ahl | Sweden | 21.27 | |
| 7 | Michele Paggi | Italy | 21.32 | |
| 8 | Jimmy Melfort | France | 21.43 | |

=== Heats ===
30 July
Qualified: first 3 in each heat and 4 best to the Semifinal

==== Heat 1 ====
Wind: 0.6 m/s

| Rank | Name | Nationality | Time | Notes |
|---|---|---|---|---|
| 1 | John Ertzgaard | Norway | 20.70 | Q |
| 2 | Graham Beasley | United Kingdom | 21.03 | Q |
| 3 | Michele Paggi | Italy | 21.11 | Q |
| 4 | Aldo Tonazzi | Switzerland | 21.17 | q |
| 5 | Jimmy Melfort | France | 21.28 | q |
| 6 | Predrag Momirović | Yugoslavia | 21.73 | |
| | Shamil Mamudov | Georgia | DNF | |

==== Heat 2 ====
Wind: 0.0 m/s

| Rank | Name | Nationality | Time | Notes |
|---|---|---|---|---|
| 1 | Christos Magos | Greece | 20.79 | Q |
| 2 | John Stewart | United Kingdom | 20.88 | Q |
| 3 | Frédéric Krantz | France | 20.92 | Q |
| 4 | Thomas Mellin-Olsen | Norway | 21.39 | q |
| 5 | Thomas Scheidl | Austria | 21.90 | |

==== Heat 3 ====
Wind: 1.2 m/s

| Rank | Name | Nationality | Time | Notes |
|---|---|---|---|---|
| 1 | Stefan Holz | Germany | 20.64 | Q |
| 2 | Massimiliano Donati | Italy | 20.84 | Q |
| 3 | Stéphane Peccatus | France | 21.11 | Q |
| 4 | Ion Gutiérrez | Spain | 21.45 | |
| 5 | Gideon Jablonka | Israel | 21.46 | |
| | Christofer Ohlsson | Sweden | DNF | |

==== Heat 4 ====
Wind: 0.5 m/s

| Rank | Name | Nationality | Time | Notes |
|---|---|---|---|---|
| 1 | Christian Malcolm | United Kingdom | 20.83 | Q |
| 2 | Anastasios Poulioglou | Greece | 20.92 | Q |
| 3 | Mikael Ahl | Sweden | 21.11 | Q |
| 4 | Erik Kringeland | Norway | 21.22 | q |
| 5 | Roman Zubek | Czech Republic | 21.42 | |
| 6 | Israel Nuñez | Spain | 21.63 | |

== Participation ==
According to an unofficial count, 24 athletes from 14 countries participated in the event.

- Austria (1)
- Czech Republic (1)
- France (3)
- Georgia (1)
- Germany (1)
- Greece (2)
- Israel (1)
- Italy (2)
- Norway (3)
- Spain (2)
- Sweden (2)
- Switzerland (1)
- United Kingdom (3)
- Yugoslavia (1)
