= Ian Mackie =

British sprinter

Personal information
- Nationality: British (Scottish)
- Born: 27 February 1975 (age 51) Dunfermline, Scotland
- Height: 185 cm (6 ft 1 in)
- Weight: 80 kg (176 lb)

Sport
- Sport: Athletics
- Event: Sprints
- Club: Pitreavie AAC
Medal record
Men 's athletics
Representing Great Britain
World Junior Championships
Gold medal – first place	1994 Lisbon	4 x 100 m
Bronze medal – third place	1994 Lisbon	200 m

Ian Mackie (born 27 February 1975) is a former sprinter who competed in the men's 100m competition at the 1996 Summer Olympics.

== Biography ==
He was 100/200 inter counties champion and won five Scottish 100 metre titles, and the 200m title in 2001.

At the 1996 Olympic Games in Atlanta, he represented Great Britain in the 100 metres event and recorded a 10.27 in his first heat, and then a 10.25 in the second round. In the next round, the semifinals, he recorded a DNS (did not start).

His personal best in the 100 is 10.17, set in 1996. And 2nd fastest in all time Scottish list, only behind Allan Wells and in the 200m his pb was 20.85 He was a member of Pitreavie AAC.

Mackie became the British 100 metres champion after winning the British AAA Championships title at the 1997 AAA Championships.

Mackie retired in 2005 at the age of 30, during the Scottish trials for the 2006 Commonwealth Games, held in Glasgow.
