= Bryan Howard (sprinter) =

American sprinter (born 1976)

Personal information
- Born: October 7, 1976 (age 50) Moreno Valley, California, United States

Sport
- Sport: Track and field
Medal record
Representing United States
Summer Universiade
Gold medal – first place	1997 Catania	4x100m relay

Bryan Howard (born October 7, 1976) is an American former sprinter. Howard ran for Canyon Springs High School in Moreno Valley, California. He was the 1993 CIF California State Meet champion in the 100 meters. He was unable to repeat in 1994 due to a false start. Earlier in the season, he had used his fast start to set the national high school record of 5.69 in the 50 meters at the Sunkist Invitational, which still stood in 2014. The year before, it was announced he had also broken the record, formerly held by Bill Green since 1979. However Paul Turner of University City High in San Diego was later ruled to be the winner and recordholder, which lasted exactly one year. He was also twice runner-up in the 200 meters, in 1993 and 1994, in 1993 behind Calvin Harrison. The 1994 race. Video on YouTube Within Riverside County, Howard's records lasted over twenty years until the emergence of Michael Norman. Howard later joined the HSI track team, running on relay teams with world record holder Maurice Greene. Bryan howard is one of the fastest men ever at 50 meters while in high school

Competing for the TCU Horned Frogs track and field team, Howard won the 1998 NCAA Division I Outdoor Track and Field Championships in the 4 × 100 m. He had earlier run for the Auburn Tigers track and field team.
