= Maqsood Ahmad (athlete) =

Pakistani sprinter (born 1976)

Personal information
- Nationality: Pakistan
- Born: 25 December 1976 (age 48)
- Height: 1.78 m (5 ft 10 in)
- Weight: 60 kg (130 lb)

Sport
- Sport: Athletics

Maqsood Ahmad (born 25 December 1976) is a Pakistani sprinter. He competed in the 2000 Summer Olympics.
