= Mario Watts =

Jamaican sprinter

Personal information
- Born: May 21, 1975 (age 51)

Achievements and titles
- National finals: 2000 Jamaican Champs; • 400 m hurdles, 4th; 2001 Jamaican Champs; • 400 m hurdles, 4th; 2001 Jamaican Champs; • 400 m hurdles, 3rd (bronze)
Medal record
Men's athletics
Representing Jamaica
IAAF World Championships in Athletics
Silver medal – second place	Edmonton 2001	4 × 400 m

Mario Watts (born May 21, 1975) is a retired professional sprinter and hurdler from Jamaica. He won a silver medal at the 2001 World Championships in Athletics by virtue of running for his team in the preliminary rounds. At those same championships he also competed in the 400 meter hurdles where he advanced to the semifinals but did not advance to the finals.

As a junior he won silver at the 1994 World Junior Championships in Athletics in the 4 × 400 m, running in the final. He also won the 2001 Central American and Caribbean Championships in Athletics in the 400 m hurdles, running 49.31 in the final.

As a youth he ran for Phillips Academy in Andover, Massachusetts. In 2003, he was named among the top ten athletes in Pennsylvania history.

== Major international competitions ==
Year	Competition	Venue	Position	Event	Notes
2001	IAAF World Championships in Athletics	Edmonton, Canada	6th (Heat 3, Semifinals)	400 meter hurdles	49.86
2001	IAAF World Championships in Athletics	Edmonton, Canada	2nd (Heat 2, Heats)	4 × 400 m	3:00.97
