= Toya Jones =

American football player (1976–2026)

No. 25
- Position: Defensive back / linebacker

Personal information
- Born: October 28, 1976; Victoria, Texas, U.S.
- Died: October 22, 2026 (aged 49)
- Listed height: 6 ft 3 in (1.91 m)
- Listed weight: 220 lb (100 kg)

Career information
- High school: Refugio (Refugio, Texas)
- College: Texas A&M
- NFL draft: 1999: undrafted

Career history
- San Francisco 49ers (1999)*; Birmingham Thunderbolts (2001); Denver Broncos (2001); British Columbia Lions (2001); Houston Texans (2002); Toronto Argonauts (2003)
- * Offseason or practice squad member only

Toya Cardin Jones (October 28, 1976 – October 22, 2026) was an American professional football player who was a defensive back for the British Columbia Lions of the Canadian Football League (CFL). He played college football for the Texas A&M Aggies.

Jones attended Refugio High School. Most gold medals in Texas State track and field meet history at 14, winning 17 total.

He was a member of the American 4 × 100 m relay squad at the 1994 World Junior Championships in Athletics. Jones was also member of the Texas A&M 4 × 100 m relay National Champion team and All-American, undefeated at 12–0.

Jones died on October 22, 2026, at the age of 49, after a having a heart attack on the previous weekend.
