= Deworski Odom =

American sprinter

Personal information
- Nationality: American
- Born: April 11, 1977 (age 49) Cordele, Georgia, U.S.
- Height: 6 ft 2 in (1.88 m)
- Weight: 185 lb (84 kg)

Sport
- Sport: Running
- Event(s): Sprints, Hurdles

Achievements and titles
- Personal best(s): 100m: 10.26 (Lisbon 1994); 110m h: 13.44 (Flagstaff 2000)
Medal record
Men's athletics
Representing the United States
World Junior Championships
Silver medal – second place	1994 Lisbon	4×100 m relay
Bronze medal – third place	1994 Lisbon	100 m

Deworski Odom (born April 11, 1977) is a former American sprinter who specialized in the 100 metres. As a 17-year-old, he won a bronze medal in the 100 metres at the 1994 World Junior Championships, surpassing Henry Thomas's World Youth Best over this distance.

Odom was born in Cordele, Georgia, to Lessie Odom, then 16. When he was 4 years old, he moved with family to Philadelphia. He began running as a sixth-grader at Shoemaker Middle School. He later attended Overbrook High School. In the 1995 National Scholastic Indoor Track and Field Championships in Syracuse, New York, Odom set three national records.

Although recruited by every major track program in the United States, Odom did not meet the academic requirements to attend college. He went to Wallace State Community College in Hanceville, Alabama, where his career derailed. He eventually attended St. Augustine's University in Raleigh, North Carolina, for one season before turning professional.

As of 2017, Odom serves as track and field coach at his alma mater, Overbrook High School in Philadelphia.

Records
Preceded by (United States) Henry Thomas	Boys' World Youth Best Holder, 100 metres 21 July 1994 – 14 April 2001	Succeeded by (Trinidad and Tobago) Darrel Brown
