= Shaun Farrell =

Sprinter and middle-distance runner competing for New Zealand

Shaun Richard Farrell (born 5 March 1975) is a sprinter/middle-distance runner who competed for New Zealand.

Farrell competed in the 400m at the 1994 World Juniors Athletics Championships in Portugal. He placed 3rd in the Final running 46.31 seconds.

He participated in the 1994 and 1998 Commonwealth Games, competing in the 400m and 800m. He is the former New Zealand record holder over 400m.

== Personal bests ==
Distance	Time	Place	Date
400 m	46.09 NR	Wanganui	1998
800 m	1:45.45	Sydney	1998
