= Georkis Vera =

Cuban sprinter

Personal information
- Nationality: Cuban
- Born: 22 May 1975 (age 51)

Sport
- Sport: Sprinting
- Event: 4 × 400 metres relay

Georkis Vera Rivaux (born 22 May 1975) is a Cuban sprinter. He competed in the men's 4 × 400 metres relay at the 1996 Summer Olympics.
