= Tony Wheeler (athlete) =

American sprinter

Personal information
- Nationality: American
- Born: January 19, 1975 (age 51) Columbus, Ohio, United States
- Education: Clemson

Sport
- Sport: Track and Field
- Events: 200 m; 400 m
- College team: Clemson Tigers

Achievements and titles
- World finals: 2x world U20 Champion
- Personal bests: 200 m: 20.91; 400 m: 46.80
Medal record
Representing United States
Summer Universiade
Gold medal – first place	1997 Catania	4x400m relay
Silver medal – second place	1997 Catania	200m
World U20 Championships
Gold medal – first place	1999 Lisbon	200m
Gold medal – first place	1999 Lisbon	4x400m relay

Tony Wheeler (born January 19, 1975) is an American former sprinter. Wheeler ran the 200m, 400m and 4x100m for the Clemson Tigers.

== College career ==
In 1995, Wheeler finished 3rd at the NCAA Indoor 200m finals as a sophomore. The next year he finished 3rd in the 200m at the NCAA Outdoor Championships. In his senior season, Wheeler finished 2nd in the 4×100 relay at the NCAA Outdoor Championships.

=== Awards ===
In 2002, Wheeler was named to the 50th anniversary All ACC track and field team and was inducted to the Clemson Hall of Fame in. 2017.
