= Carlton Chambers =

Canadian sprinter (born 1975)

Personal information
- Born: June 27, 1975 (age 51) Toronto, Canada

Sport
- Sport: Track and field
Medal record
Representing Canada
Olympic Games
Gold medal – first place	1996 Atlanta	4×100 m relay
World Championships
Gold medal – first place	1997 Athens	4x100 m relay
Commonwealth Games
Gold medal – first place	1994 Victoria	4x100 m relay

Carlton Chambers (born June 27, 1975) is a retired sprint athlete from Canada, and a winner of gold medal in 4 × 100 m relay at the 1996 Summer Olympics. He ran in the preliminary heats, however a groin injury prevented him from running in the final race which was won by Robert Esmie, Glenroy Gilbert, Bruny Surin, and Donovan Bailey. He had a personal best of 10.19 in the 100 metres.

== Early career ==
Chambers first started track when he entered grade nine at Malton's Ascension of our Lord Catholic Secondary School in September 1990. Born in June 1975, he was 15 years old as of Sept 1 of that year and competed as a junior, where most 15-year-olds compete in the younger midget boy category. With little coaching or training Chambers ran to a 10.84 and a silver medal in the 100 m at the O.F.S.A.A. (Ontario Federation of Schools Athletic Association) in June of '91. The race finished with the first five junior boys within 0.02 seconds of each other.

That year Mark Guthrie of the Brampton Track Club approached the 5'6" sprinter and suggested that he join the club. Chambers didn't show up to most of the practices until May of the following year - 1992. That year going into O.F.S.A.A., Chambers relied on his natural ability rather than his training preparation. He won the junior boys 100 m in 10.99 and Guthrie knew he had a star on his hands.

From then on Chambers trained more regularly and enjoyed quite a lot of success at O.T.F.A. (Ontario Track and Field Association) meets. At the beginning of the '93 high school track season Chambers was preparing himself with Guthrie for the first of three possible senior boys 100's, as he was only in grade 11 at this time. But the Catholic separate school board had a "work to rule" strike and as a result Chambers' school did not send athletes to O.F.S.A.A.

The following indoor season Chambers trained intently and won a 60 m Gold medal at the York University high school Track and Field invitational. Chambers ran a hand-timed 10.2 at the city track meet (ROPSSAA) and he went to the O.F.S.A.A. ranked #1 in the province. There the 100 m record had once been set at 10.55 by Yorkdale S.S.'s Ben Johnson and was later broken by Sudbury LaSalle's Robert Esmie when he ran 10.50 in 1991. In the qualifying heat, Carlton ran to a legal, non wind-aided, time of 10.41 seconds. In the final, Eric Frempong of Martingrove C.I. ran a wind-aided 10.36 to win Bronze, and Dave Tomlin of Grand River ran 10.30 for Silver. Carlton Chambers then claimed the O.F.S.A.A. Gold with his 10.27w time.

== NCAA ==
After his time in the O.F.S.A.A. Chambers signed on at Clemson University with a full track scholarship.

The summer of 1994 saw Chambers win a Silver medal at the Canadian Juniors behind defending champion Frempong. This qualified him for the World Juniors in Portugal. There he ran a new Canadian Junior record, breaking Desai Williams' 16-year-old 10.32 with a 10.30, 5th-place finish. Chambers got his first international relay experience as the Canadian Junior 4 × 100 m team of Chambers, Frempong, Dave Tomlin and Chris Robinson won Bronze in 39.90. That same summer he was selected to run the third leg of the Commonwealth 4 × 100 m relay where he handed the baton off to Bruny Surin who ran it in for Gold.

After two years at Clemson, Carlton went to the 1996 NCAA championships and ran to a fourth place in the 100 m with a time of 10.19. Ato Boldon of UCLA won the race and later went to the 1996 Olympic Games and ran a 9.90 100 m in Atlanta to win bronze.

== 1996 Olympics ==
In Atlanta, Chambers ran the heats in the 4 × 100 m relay. In the final Chambers was replaced by Robert Esmie, who lead off the relay. Canada won the gold medal in 37.69 seconds, defeating the United States and establishing a national record in the event. Chambers had suffered a groin injury running the 200 m, and the switch with Esmie was made.

In 2008, Carlton Chambers, along with his 4 × 100 m relay teammates from the 1996 Atlanta Olympics were inducted into the Canadian Sports Hall of Fame.
