= Sylvester Omodiale =

Nigerian hurdler

Personal information
- Nationality: Nigerian
- Born: 5 September 1977 (age 48)

Sport
- Sport: Track and field
- Event: 400 metres hurdles
Medal record
Men's athletics
Representing Nigeria
African Championships
Gold medal – first place	2000 Algiers	400 m hurdles

Sylvester Omodiale (born 5 September 1977) is a Nigerian hurdler. He competed in the men's 400 metres hurdles at the 2000 Summer Olympics. In 2006, he was sentenced to four years in prison for smuggling cocaine.
