= 1994 World Junior Championships in Athletics =

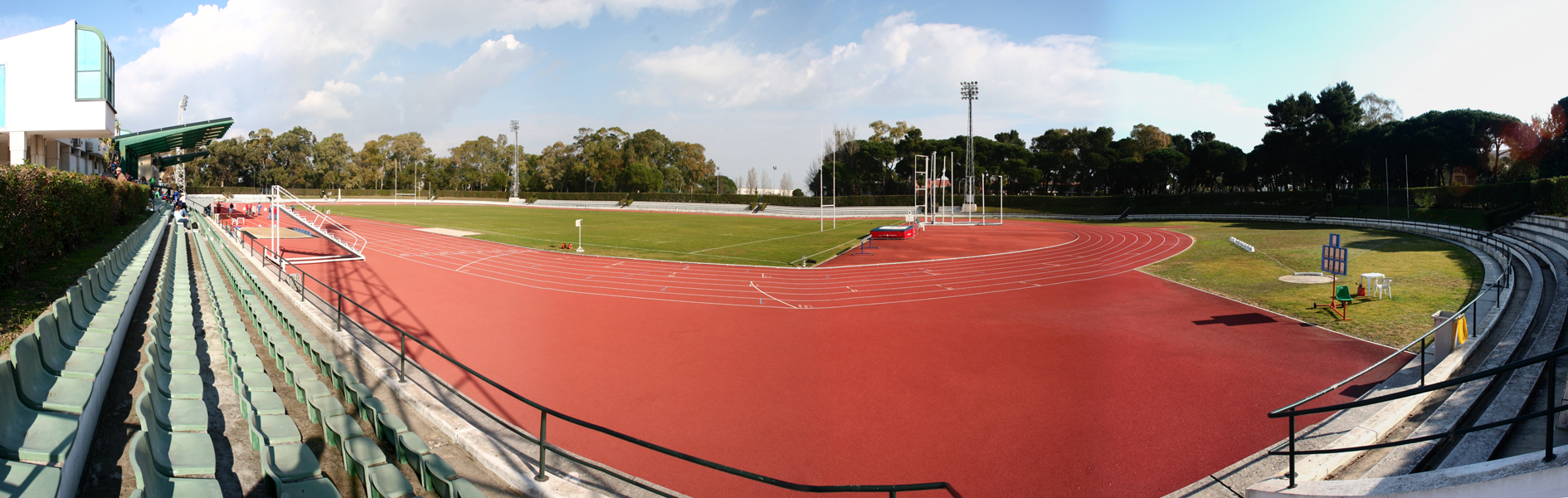
- The host stadium in Lisbon
- Host city: Lisbon, Portugal
- Nations: 143
- Athletes: 1139
- Events: 42
- Dates: 20–24 July
- Main venue: Estádio Universitário de Lisboa

The 1994 World Junior Championships in Athletics were held in Lisbon, the capital city of Portugal, on July 20–24.

== Results ==
=== Men ===
Event	Gold		Silver		Bronze	
100 metres	Deji Aliu; Nigeria	10.21	Jason Gardener; Great Britain	10.25	Deworski Odom; United States	10.26 WYB
200 metres	Tony Wheeler; United States	20.62	Deji Aliu; Nigeria	20.88	Ian Mackie; Great Britain	20.95
400 metres	Awotoro Adediran; Nigeria	45.83	Ramon Clay; United States	46.13	Shaun Farrell; New Zealand	46.31
800 metres	Paul Byrne; Australia	1:47.42	Japheth Kimutai; Kenya	1:48.22	Alain Miranda; Cuba	1:48.24
1500 metres	Julius Achon; Uganda	3:39.78	André Bucher; Switzerland	3:40.46	Philip Mosima; Kenya	3:41.09
5000 metres	Daniel Komen; Kenya	13:45.37	Habte Jifar; Ethiopia	13:49.70	Giuliano Battocletti; Italy	13:51.16
10,000 metres	Daniel Komen; Kenya	28:29.74	Kenji Takao; Japan	28:55.24	Michitane Noda; Japan	29:00.55
20 kilometres road run	Clodoaldo da Silva; Brazil	1:03:21	Carlos García; Spain	1:03:38	Antonello Landi; Italy	1:03:40
110 metres hurdles	Frank Busemann; Germany	13.47	Dudley Dorival; United States	13.65	Darius Pemberton; United States	13.93
400 metres hurdles	Hennadiy Horbenko; Ukraine	50.56	Miklós Róth; Hungary	50.85	Noel Levy; Great Britain	50.94
3000 metres steeplechase	Paul Chemase; Kenya	8:31.51	Julius Chelule; Kenya	8:33.64	Yarba Lakhal; Morocco	8:34.42
10,000 metres walk	Jorge Segura; Mexico	40:26.93	Yevgeniy Shmalyuk; Russia	40:32.72	Artur Meleshkevich; Belarus	40:35.52
4 × 100 metres relay	Great Britain; Jason Gardener; Julian Golding; Ian Mackie; Trevor Cameron	39.60	United States; Deworski Odom; Tony Wheeler; Patrick Johnson; Toya Jones	39.76	Canada; Carlton Chambers; Dave Tomlin; Chris Robinson; Eric Frempong-Manso	39.90
4 × 400 metres relay	United States; Desmond Johnson; Tony Wheeler; Milton Campbell; Ramon Clay	3:03.32	Jamaica; Rohan McDonald; Davian Clarke; Mario Watts; Michael McDonald	3:04.12	Great Britain; Guy Bullock; Nick Budden; Noel Levy; Mark Hylton	3:06.59
High jump	Jagan Hames; Australia	2.23	Antoine Burke; Ireland	2.20	Mika Polku; Finland	2.20
Pole vault	Viktor Chistyakov; Russia	5.60	Dmitriy Markov; Belarus	5.50	Taoufik Lachheb; France	5.30
Long jump	Gregor Cankar; Slovenia	8.04	Bogdan Tarus; Romania	8.01	Shigeru Tagawa; Japan	7.85
Triple jump	Onochie Achike; Great Britain	16.67	Leonard Cobb; United States	16.65	Ronald Servius; France	16.55
Shot put	Adam Nelson; United States	18.34	Andreas Gustafsson; Sweden	17.95	Ville Tiisanoja; Finland	17.90
Discus throw	Frantz Kruger; South Africa	58.22	Julio Piñero; Argentina	57.80	Timo Sinervo; Finland	56.76
Javelin throw	Marius Corbett; South Africa	77.98	Matti Närhi; Finland	74.92	Isbel Luaces; Cuba	72.82
Hammer throw	Szymon Ziółkowski; Poland	70.44	Igor Tugay; Ukraine	70.08	Sergey Vasilyev; Russia	66.14
Decathlon	Benjamin Jensen; Norway	7676	Klaus Isekenmeier; Germany	7298	Glenn Lindqvist; Finland	7288
WR world record | AR area record | CR championship record | GR games record | NR national record | OR Olympic record | PB personal best | SB season best | WL world leading (in a given season)

=== Women ===
Event	Gold		Silver		Bronze	
100 metres	Sabrina Kelly; United States	11.36	Aspen Burkett; United States	11.40	Philomena Mensah; Ghana	11.43
200 metres	Heide Seÿerling; South Africa	22.80 (w)	LaKeisha Backus; United States	22.86 (w)	Tatyana Tkalich; Ukraine	23.35 (w)
400 metres	Olabisi Afolabi; Nigeria	51.97	Monique Hennagan; United States	52.25	Hana Benešová; Czech Republic	52.60
800 metres	Mioara Cosulianu; Romania	2:04.95	Jackline Maranga; Kenya	2:05.05	Kutre Dulecha; Ethiopia	2:05.17
1500 metres	Anita Weyermann; Switzerland	4:13.97	Marta Domínguez; Spain	4:14.59	Atsumi Yashima; Japan	4:15.84
3000 metres	Gabriela Szabo; Romania	8:47.40	Susie Power; Australia	8:56.93	Sally Barsosio; Kenya	8:59.34
10,000 metres	Yoko Yamazaki; Japan	32:34.11	Jackline Okemwa; Kenya	33:19.51	Jebiwot Keitany; Kenya	33:35.98
100 metres hurdles	Kirsten Bolm; Germany	13.26	LaTasha Colander; United States	13.30	Diane Allahgreen; Great Britain	13.31
400 metres hurdles	Ionela Târlea; Romania	56.25	Virna De Angeli; Italy	56.93	Emma Holmqvist; Sweden	57.23
5000 metres walk	Irina Stankina; Russia	21:05.41	Susana Feitor; Portugal	21:12.87	Natalya Trofimova; Russia	21:24.71
4 × 100 metres relay	Jamaica; Tulia Robinson; Beverley Langley; Kerry-Ann Richards; Astia Walker	44.01	Germany; Sandra Roos; Gabriele Becker; Sandra Görigk; Esther Möller	44.78	Great Britain; Diane Allahgreen; Susan Williams; Sinead Dudgeon; Rebecca Drummond	45.08
4 × 400 metres relay	United States; Cicely Scott; Monique Hennagan; Michelle Brown; Jowanna McMullen	3:32.08	Romania; Marinella Mircea; Lavinia Miroiu; Andrea Burlacu; Ionela Tîrlea	3:36.59	Germany; Susanne Merkel; Claudia Angerhausen; Ivonne Teichmann; Ulrike Urbansky	3:36.65
High jump	Olga Kaliturina; Russia	1.88	Kajsa Bergqvist; Sweden	1.88	Amy Acuff; United States; Lenka Riháková; Slovakia	1.88
Long jump	Yelena Lysak; Russia	6.72	Heli Koivula; Finland	6.64	Ingvild Larsen; Norway	6.39
Triple jump	Yelena Lysak; Russia	14.43	Ren Ruiping; China	14.36	Tatyana Lebedeva; Russia	13.62
Shot put	Cheng Xiaoyan; China	18.76	Yumileidi Cumbá; Cuba	18.09	Claudia Mues; Germany	17.07
Discus throw	Corrie de Bruin; Netherlands	55.18	Sabine Sievers; Germany	54.86	Suzy Powell; United States	52.62
Javelin throw	Taina Uppa; Finland	59.02	María Caridad Álvarez; Cuba	58.26	Réka Kovács; Hungary	55.88
Heptathlon	Kathleen Gutjahr; Germany	5918	Regla Cárdenas; Cuba	5834	Ding Ying; China	5785
WR world record | AR area record | CR championship record | GR games record | NR national record | OR Olympic record | PB personal best | SB season best | WL world leading (in a given season)

== Medal table ==
* Host nation (Portugal)

Rank	Nation	Gold	Silver	Bronze	Total
1	United States (USA)	5	8	4	17
2	Russia (RUS)	5	1	3	9
3	Kenya (KEN)	3	4	3	10
4	Germany (GER)	3	3	2	8
5	Romania (ROM)	3	2	0	5
6	South Africa (RSA)	3	0	0	3
7	Great Britain (GBR)	2	1	5	8
8	Australia (AUS)	2	1	0	3
8	Jamaica (JAM)	2	1	0	3
8	Nigeria (NGR)	2	1	0	3
11	Finland (FIN)	1	2	4	7
12	Japan (JPN)	1	1	3	5
13	China (CHN)	1	1	1	3
13	Ukraine (UKR)	1	1	1	3
15	Switzerland (SUI)	1	1	0	2
16	Norway (NOR)	1	0	1	2
17	Brazil (BRA)	1	0	0	1
17	Mexico (MEX)	1	0	0	1
17	Netherlands (NED)	1	0	0	1
17	Poland (POL)	1	0	0	1
17	Slovenia (SLO)	1	0	0	1
17	Uganda (UGA)	1	0	0	1
23	Cuba (CUB)	0	3	2	5
24	Sweden (SWE)	0	2	1	3
25	Spain (ESP)	0	2	0	2
26	Italy (ITA)	0	1	2	3
27	Belarus (BLR)	0	1	1	2
27	Ethiopia (ETH)	0	1	1	2
27	Hungary (HUN)	0	1	1	2
30	Argentina (ARG)	0	1	0	1
30	Ireland (IRL)	0	1	0	1
30	Portugal (POR)*	0	1	0	1
33	France (FRA)	0	0	2	2
34	Canada (CAN)	0	0	1	1
34	Czech Republic (CZE)	0	0	1	1
34	Ghana (GHA)	0	0	1	1
34	Morocco (MAR)	0	0	1	1
34	New Zealand (NZL)	0	0	1	1
34	Slovakia (SVK)	0	0	1	1
Totals (39 entries)		42	42	43	127

== Participation ==
According to an unofficial count through an unofficial result list, 1139 athletes from 143 countries participated in the event. This is in agreement with the official numbers as published.

- Albania (2)
- Algeria (10)
- American Samoa (1)
- Andorra (1)
- Angola (2)
- Argentina (4)
- Australia (48)
- Austria (1)
- Azerbaijan (2)
- Bahamas (9)
- Barbados (4)
- Belarus (8)
- Belgium (10)
- Benin (1)
- Bermuda (1)
- Bolivia (2)
- Bosnia and Herzegovina (2)
- Botswana (2)
- Brazil (16)
- British Virgin Islands (1)
- Bulgaria (11)
- Burkina Faso (1)
- Burundi (2)
- Canada (18)
- Cape Verde (1)
- Cayman Islands (1)
- Chad (1)
- Chile (2)
- China (28)
- Chinese Taipei (13)
- Colombia (3)
- Costa Rica (1)
- Côte d'Ivoire (2)
- Croatia (3)
- Cuba (27)
- Cyprus (2)
- Czech Republic (17)
- Denmark (3)
- Djibouti (1)
- Ecuador (3)
- Egypt (2)
- El Salvador (1)
- Equatorial Guinea (1)
- Estonia (1)
- Ethiopia (16)
- Fiji (1)
- Finland (34)
- France (39)
- Gambia (1)
- Georgia (1)
- Germany (61)
- Ghana (2)
- Gibraltar (1)
- Great Britain (40)
- Greece (16)
- Guam (1)
- Guinea (1)
- Guyana (1)
- Haiti (1)
- Honduras (1)
- Hungary (19)
- Iceland (2)
- Ireland (7)
- Israel (3)
- Italy (34)
- Jamaica (26)
- Japan (47)
- Jordan (1)
- Kazakhstan (5)
- Kenya (19)
- Kuwait (1)
- Kyrgyzstan (2)
- Latvia (7)
- Lesotho (2)
- Lithuania (2)
- Macedonia (2)
- Madagascar (1)
- Malawi (2)
- Malaysia (1)
- Maldives (1)
- Mali (2)
- Mauritania (1)
- Mauritius (2)
- Mexico (12)
- Moldova (6)
- Mongolia (1)
- Morocco (3)
- Mozambique (1)
- Myanmar (2)
- Namibia (2)
- Nepal (2)
- Netherlands (8)
- New Zealand (15)
- Nigeria (10)
- Niger (2)
- Norway (15)
- Palestine (1)
- Paraguay (1)
- Peru (1)
- Philippines (1)
- Poland (20)
- Portugal (21)
- Puerto Rico (2)
- Qatar (3)
- Romania (22)
- Russia (44)
- Saint Kitts and Nevis (1)
- Saint Lucia (1)
- Saint Vincent and the Grenadines (1)
- San Marino (2)
- São Tomé and Príncipe (2)
- Saudi Arabia (8)
- Senegal (2)
- Seychelles (2)
- Sierra Leone (1)
- Singapore (1)
- Slovakia (12)
- Slovenia (9)
- South Africa (20)
- South Korea (11)
- Spain (42)
- Sudan (1)
- Swaziland (1)
- Sweden (22)
- Switzerland (9)
- Tajikistan (2)
- Togo (1)
- Tonga (1)
- Trinidad and Tobago (2)
- Tunisia (2)
- Turkey (4)
- Turkmenistan (2)
- Uganda (1)
- Ukraine (16)
- United Arab Emirates (1)
- United States (69)
- Uruguay (1)
- Uzbekistan (3)
- Yemen (2)
- FR Yugoslavia (8)
- Zaire (1)
- Zambia (1)
- Zimbabwe (1)

== See also ==
- 1994 in athletics (track and field)
