= 1999 European Athletics U23 Championships – Men's 100 metres =

The men's 100 metres event at the 1999 European Athletics U23 Championships was held in Gothenburg, Sweden, at Ullevi on 29 and 30 July 1999.

== Medalists ==
Gold	Christoforos Choidis; Greece
Silver	Marcin Nowak; Poland
Silver	Christian Malcolm; Great Britain

== Results ==
=== Final ===
30 July
Wind: 2.8 m/s

Rank	Name	Nationality	Time	Notes
1st place, gold medalist(s)	Christoforos Choidis	Greece	10.19 w	
2nd place, silver medalist(s)	Marcin Nowak	Poland	10.28 w	
2nd place, silver medalist(s)	Christian Malcolm	Great Britain	10.28 w	
4	John Ertzgaard	Norway	10.29 w	
5	Jérôme Éyana	France	10.41 w	
6	Frédéric Krantz	France	10.46 w	
7	Adam Forgheim	Poland	10.47 w	
8	David Patros	France	10.55 w	

=== Semifinals ===
29 July
Qualified: first 4 in each to the Final

==== Semifinal 1 ====
Wind: 0.7 m/s

Rank	Name	Nationality	Time	Notes
1	Christian Malcolm	Great Britain	10.22	Q, CR
2	Christoforos Choidis	Greece	10.25	Q
3	Jérôme Éyana	France	10.30	Q
4	Adam Forgheim	Poland	10.32	Q
5	Jamie Henthorn	Great Britain	10.39	
6	Martijn Ungerer	Netherlands	10.46	
7	Yordan Yovchev	Bulgaria	10.62	
	Diego Santos	Spain	DNS	

==== Semifinal 2 ====
Wind: -0.3 m/s

Rank	Name	Nationality	Time	Notes
1	Marcin Nowak	Poland	10.25	Q
2	John Ertzgaard	Norway	10.27	Q
3	Frédéric Krantz	France	10.40	Q
4	David Patros	France	10.47	Q
5	Mark Findlay	Great Britain	10.49	
6	Leszek Dyja	Poland	10.58	
7	Alexander Kosenkow	Germany	10.60	
8	José Illán	Spain	10.69	

=== Heats ===
29 July
Qualified: first 3 in each heat and 1 best to the Semifinal

==== Heat 1 ====
Wind:-1.8 m/s

Rank	Name	Nationality	Time	Notes
1	Marcin Nowak	Poland	10.47	Q
2	Mark Findlay	Great Britain	10.56	Q
3	Yordan Yovchev	Bulgaria	10.64	Q
4	Lenny Martinez	Sweden	10.64	
5	Thomas Mellin-Olsen	Norway	10.66	
6	Hildberto Almeida	Portugal	10.67	
7	Orkatz Beitia	Spain	10.68	

==== Heat 2 ====
Wind: -0.3 m/s

Rank	Name	Nationality	Time	Notes
1	Frédéric Krantz	France	10.51	Q
2	Diego Santos	Spain	10.57	Q
3	Martijn Ungerer	Netherlands	10.60	Q
4	Christofer Ohlsson	Sweden	10.60	
5	Attila Farkas	Hungary	10.61	
6	Boštjan Fridrih	Slovenia	10.64	
7	Vitor Vasconcelos	Portugal	10.85	

==== Heat 3 ====
Wind: 0.4 m/s

Rank	Name	Nationality	Time	Notes
1	John Ertzgaard	Norway	10.27	Q, CR
2	Christian Malcolm	Great Britain	10.31	Q
3	Adam Forgheim	Poland	10.34	Q
4	Luca Verdecchia	Italy	10.50	
5	Gideon Jablonka	Israel	10.62	
6	Pavel Rada	Czech Republic	10.68	
7	Georgíos Skender	Cyprus	11.37	

==== Heat 4 ====
Wind: 1.6 m/s

Rank	Name	Nationality	Time	Notes
1	Jérôme Éyana	France	10.40	Q
2	Jamie Henthorn	Great Britain	10.42	Q
3	Alexander Kosenkow	Germany	10.45	Q
4	Leszek Dyja	Poland	10.47	q
5	Aristotelis Gavelas	Greece	10.50	
6	Roman Zubek	Czech Republic	10.62	
7	Shamil Mamudov	Georgia	11.02	

==== Heat 5 ====
Wind: 0.0 m/s

Rank	Name	Nationality	Time	Notes
1	Christoforos Choidis	Greece	10.37	Q
2	David Patros	France	10.49	Q
3	José Illán	Spain	10.52	Q
4	Erik Kringeland	Norway	10.55	
5	László Babály	Hungary	10.58	
6	Francesco Scuderi	Italy	10.59	
7	Predrag Momirović	Yugoslavia	10.81	

== Participation ==
According to an unofficial count, 35 athletes from 19 countries participated in the event.

- Bulgaria (1)
- Cyprus (1)
- Czech Republic (2)
- France (3)
- Georgia (1)
- Germany (1)
- Great Britain (3)
- Greece (2)
- Hungary (2)
- Israel (1)
- Italy (2)
- Netherlands (1)
- Norway (3)
- Poland (3)
- Portugal (2)
- Slovenia (1)
- Spain (3)
- Sweden (2)
- Yugoslavia (1)
