= Athletics at the 2005 Jeux de la Francophonie – Results =

These are the official results of the athletics competition at the 2005 Jeux de la Francophonie which took place on 11–16 December 2005 in Niamey, Niger.

== Men's results ==
=== 100 meters ===
Heats – December 11
Wind:
Heat 1: -0.3 m/s, Heat 2: +0.3 m/s, Heat 3: 0.0 m/s, Heat 4: 0.0 m/s, Heat 5: 0.0 m/s

Rank	Heat	Name	Nationality	Time	Notes
1	1	Éric Pacôme N'Dri	Ivory Coast	10.55	Q
1	3	Siapade Marius Loua	Ivory Coast	10.55	Q
3	1	Henrico Louis	Mauritius	10.57	Q
3	3	Idrissa Sanou	Burkina Faso	10.57	Q
3	4	Béranger Aymard Bosse	Central African Republic	10.57	Q
6	4	Amr Ibrahim Mostafa Seoud	Egypt	10.61	Q
7	3	Jérôme Éyana	France	10.63	Q
8	2	Ben Youssef Meité	Ivory Coast	10.64	Q
9	1	Yannick Urbino	France	10.68	Q
9	2	Biao Sani	Cameroon	10.68	Q
11	1	Daniel Abenzoar-Foulé	Luxembourg	10.70	Q
12	2	Yacouba Bello	Niger	10.79	Q
13	3	Idrissa Saadou	Niger	10.81	Q
14	4	Wilfried Bingangoye	Gabon	10.86	Q
15	2	Rodrigue Sialo	Central African Republic	10.88	Q
15	5	Thierry Lubin	France	10.88	Q
17	2	Cyriaque Tarbarian	Chad	10.89	q
18	2	Devilert Arsene Kimbembe	Republic of the Congo	10.96	q
19	1	Mounir Mahadi	Chad	11.10	q
20	5	Kiyana Mpiani	Democratic Republic of the Congo	11.17	Q
21	4	Ghyd Olonghot	Republic of the Congo	11.26	Q
22	3	Alfred Engone	Gabon	11.30	q
23	3	Almamy Bangoura	Guinea	11.32	
23	4	Haita Bonyafala	Democratic Republic of the Congo	11.32	
25	3	Mohamed Sarr	Mauritania	11.38	
26	5	Nedelec Pandjou	Gabon	11.41	Q
27	5	Reginaldo Ndong	Equatorial Guinea	11.43	Q
28	4	Gabriel Leblanc	New Brunswick	11.49	
29	5	Mervin Loiseau	Seychelles	11.55	
	1	Mafo Tshihinga	Republic of the Congo	DQ	
	2	Olivier Fevry	Haiti	DNS	

Semi-finals – December 11
Wind:
Heat 1: +1.1 m/s, Heat 2: +0.5 m/s, Heat 3: +0.4 m/s

Rank	Heat	Name	Nationality	Time	Notes
1	1	Idrissa Sanou	Burkina Faso	10.36	Q
2	1	Éric Pacôme N'Dri	Ivory Coast	10.36	Q
3	2	Béranger Aymard Bosse	Central African Republic	10.45	Q
4	2	Jérôme Éyana	France	10.48	Q
5	2	Ben Youssef Meité	Ivory Coast	10.50	q
6	3	Siapade Marius Loua	Ivory Coast	10.51	Q
7	1	Henrico Louis	Mauritius	10.56	q
8	2	Daniel Abenzoar-Foulé	Luxembourg	10.57	
9	1	Yannick Urbino	France	10.58	
10	3	Amr Ibrahim Mostafa Seoud	Egypt	10.60	Q
11	1	Rodrigue Sialo	Central African Republic	10.69	
12	1	Yacouba Bello	Niger	10.76	
13	2	Cyriaque Tarbarian	Chad	10.79	
14	2	Devilert Arsene Kimbembe	Republic of the Congo	10.85	
15	3	Idrissa Saadou	Niger	10.88	
16	3	Thierry Lubin	France	10.91	
17	2	Wilfried Bingangoye	Gabon	10.96	
18	3	Mounir Mahadi	Chad	11.08	
19	1	Alfred Engone	Gabon	11.18	
20	1	Ghyd Olonghot	Republic of the Congo	11.25	
21	2	Kiyana Mpiani	Democratic Republic of the Congo	11.29	
22	3	Nedelec Pandjou	Gabon	11.34	
23	3	Reginaldo Ndong	Equatorial Guinea	11.52	
	3	Biao Sani	Cameroon	DQ	

Final – December 12
Wind: +0.4 m/s

Rank	Name	Nationality	Time	Notes
1st place, gold medalist(s)	Idrissa Sanou	Burkina Faso	10.48	
2nd place, silver medalist(s)	Éric Pacôme N'Dri	Ivory Coast	10.52	
3rd place, bronze medalist(s)	Amr Ibrahim Mostafa Seoud	Egypt	10.55	
4	Siapade Marius Loua	Ivory Coast	10.57	
5	Béranger Aymard Bosse	Central African Republic	10.62	
6	Ben Youssef Meité	Ivory Coast	10.64	
7	Jérôme Éyana	France	10.73	
	Henrico Louis	Mauritius	DNF	

=== 200 meters ===
Heats – December 11
Wind:
Heat 1: 0.0 m/s, Heat 2: 0.0 m/s, Heat 3: +0.6 m/s

Rank	Heat	Name	Nationality	Time	Notes
1	3	Ben Youssef Meité	Ivory Coast	21.08	Q
2	1	Daniel Abenzoar-Foulé	Luxembourg	21.10	Q
3	3	Christophe Cheval	France	21.15	Q
4	1	Siapade Marius Loua	Ivory Coast	21.21	Q
5	2	Oumar Loum	Senegal	21.28	Q
6	2	Amr Ibrahim Mostafa Seoud	Egypt	21.29	Q
7	3	Béranger Aymard Bosse	Central African Republic	21.45	q
8	3	Douboure Mare	Burkina Faso	21.52	q
9	1	Idrissa Sanou	Burkina Faso	21.64	
9	3	Devilert Arsene Kimbembe	Republic of the Congo	21.64	
11	2	Yacouba Bello	Niger	21.82	
12	2	Jean-Ukruch Kouassi Tiecura	Ivory Coast	21.99	
13	2	Cyriaque Tarbarian	Chad	22.13	
14	1	Rodrigue Sialo	Central African Republic	22.14	
15	1	Nathan Vadeboncoeur	Canada	22.38	
16	3	Mafo Tshihinga	Republic of the Congo	22.53	
17	1	Ghyd Olonghot	Republic of the Congo	23.04	
18	2	Baidy Sarr	Mauritania	23.57	
	1	Almamy Bangoura	Guinea	DNS	
	2	Fernando Augustin	Mauritius	DNS	
	2	Oumar Bella Bah	Guinea	DNS	

Final – December 12
Wind:
+1.0 m/s

Rank	Name	Nationality	Time	Notes
1st place, gold medalist(s)	Ben Youssef Meité	Ivory Coast	20.99	
2nd place, silver medalist(s)	Siapade Marius Loua	Ivory Coast	21.01	
3rd place, bronze medalist(s)	Oumar Loum	Senegal	21.12	
4	Christophe Cheval	France	21.24	
5	Daniel Abenzoar-Foulé	Luxembourg	21.39	
6	Béranger Aymard Bosse	Central African Republic	21.55	
7	Douboure Mare	Burkina Faso	21.68	
	Amr Ibrahim Mostafa Seoud	Egypt	DNS	

=== 400 meters ===
Heats – December 12

Rank	Heat	Name	Nationality	Time	Notes
1	2	Mathieu Gnanligo	Benin	47.02	Q
2	1	Fernando Augustin	Mauritius	47.41	Q
3	2	Ismail Daif	Morocco	47.45	Q
4	1	Younés Belkaifa	Morocco	47.50	Q
5	1	Jean-François Degrasse	Mauritius	47.54	Q
6	2	Ommanandsing Kowlessur	Mauritius	47.91	Q
7	1	Younés Frhani	Morocco	48.18	q
8	2	Gregory Kiavue	France	48.41	q
9	1	Youba Ould H'Meide	Mauritania	48.99	
10	1	Alou Boubacar	Niger	50.22	
11	2	Oumar Bella Bah	Guinea	50.36	
12	2	Florent Battistel	Monaco	50.54	
	2	Nathan Vadeboncoeur	Canada	DNS	

Final – December 13

Rank	Name	Nationality	Time	Notes
1st place, gold medalist(s)	Mathieu Gnanligo	Benin	46.43	
2nd place, silver medalist(s)	Fernando Augustin	Mauritius	46.52	
3rd place, bronze medalist(s)	Ismail Daif	Morocco	47.13	
4	Younés Belkaifa	Morocco	47.41	
5	Ommanandsing Kowlessur	Mauritius	47.62	
6	Jean-François Degrasse	Mauritius	47.66	
7	Younés Frhani	Morocco	48.10	
8	Gregory Kiavue	France	48.13	

=== 800 meters ===
Heats – December 11

Rank	Heat	Name	Nationality	Time	Notes
1	1	Assane Diallo	Senegal	1:49.38	Q
2	1	Yassine Bensghir	Morocco	1:50.76	Q
3	3	Joseph Kagisye	Burkina Faso	1:51.42	Q
4	3	Jimmy Lomba	France	1:51.61	Q
5	3	Abdelkrim Khoudri	Morocco	1:51.85	q
6	1	Thomas Planque	France	1:53.29	q
7	3	Adam Kellar	New Brunswick	1:54.32	
8	2	John Carle	Canada	1:54.88	Q
9	2	Salissou Mamane	Niger	1:55.34	Q
10	3	Geramias da Silva	Guinea-Bissau	1:56.60	
11	2	Leonard Ntala Meso	Democratic Republic of the Congo	1:56.88	
12	1	Souleyman Chebal Moctar	Mauritania	1:57.84	
13	3	Etienne Guidi	Central African Republic	1:58.07	
14	1	Gaël Massamba	Republic of the Congo	1:58.43	
15	1	Marcel Fortune Mindonga	Gabon	2:00.38	
16	2	German Edu-Monsuy	Equatorial Guinea	2:03.79	
	2	Oyaddaif Brahim	Chad	DNS	
	2	Jean Maxime Idy	Central African Republic	DNS	
	3	Moise Joseph	Haiti	DNS	

Final – December 13

Rank	Name	Nationality	Time	Notes
1st place, gold medalist(s)	Yassine Bensghir	Morocco	1:47.11	
2nd place, silver medalist(s)	Assane Diallo	Senegal	1:49.10	
3rd place, bronze medalist(s)	Abdelkrim Khoudri	Morocco	1:49.52	
4	Jimmy Lomba	France	1:50.08	
5	John Carle	Canada	1:50.75	
6	Joseph Kagisye	Burkina Faso	1:51.52	
7	Thomas Planque	France	1:52.27	
8	Salissou Mamane	Niger	1:52.65	

=== 1500 meters ===
December 16

Rank	Name	Nationality	Time	Notes
1st place, gold medalist(s)	Yassine Bensghir	Morocco	3:46.58	
2nd place, silver medalist(s)	Youssef Baba	Morocco	3:46.84	
3rd place, bronze medalist(s)	Zakaria Mazouzi	Morocco	3:47.84	
4	Abderazak Zbairi	France	3:48.52	
5	Ioan Zaizan	Romania	3:49.40	
6	Aléxis Abraham	France	3:49.57	
7	Trevor O'Brien	Canada	3:49.80	
8	Hamidou Garba Alley	Niger	3:55.64	
9	Jean-Claude Hakizimana	Burkina Faso	3:56.03	
10	Adam Kellar	New Brunswick	3:59.21	
11	Gaël Massamba	Republic of the Congo	4:01.51	
12	Benjamin Guidi	Central African Republic	4:02.89	
13	Etienne Guidi	Central African Republic	4:04.28	
14	Souleyman Chebal Moctar	Mauritania	4:09.27	
15	Fofana Sory	Guinea	4:12.71	
	Arnold Kangai	Central African Republic	DNS	

=== 5000 meters ===
December 14

Rank	Name	Nationality	Time	Notes
1st place, gold medalist(s)	Adil Kaouch	Morocco	14:16.23	
2nd place, silver medalist(s)	Abdelhalim Zahraoui	Morocco	14:16.39	
3rd place, bronze medalist(s)	Dieudonné Disi	Rwanda	14:16.41	
4	Mohammed Amyn	Morocco	14:20.65	
5	Pierre Joncheray	France	14:23.27	
6	Willy N'Duwimana	Burundi	14:28.45	
7	Marius Ionescu	Romania	14:28.75	
8	Eric Niyonsaba	Burundi	14:28.88	
9	Ionuţ Enache	Romania	14:48.26	
10	Jules Yadagba	Central African Republic	15:01.91	
11	Omar Bachir	Niger	15:02.72	
	Ilunga Mande Zatara	Democratic Republic of the Congo	DNS	

=== 10,000 meters ===
December 11

Rank	Name	Nationality	Time	Notes
1st place, gold medalist(s)	Dieudonné Disi	Rwanda	29:17.11	
2nd place, silver medalist(s)	Abderrahim Goumri	Morocco	29:18.05	
3rd place, bronze medalist(s)	Ahmed Baday	Morocco	29:18.06	
4	Abraham Niyonkuru	Burundi	29:18.08	
5	Said Azzouzi	Morocco	29:46.27	
6	Ilunga Mande Zatara	Democratic Republic of the Congo	30:37.30	
7	Souley Oumarou	Niger	31:22.14	
8	Simon Labiche	Seychelles	31:25.19	
	Benipepe Degoto Gloum	Central African Republic	DNS	

=== Marathon ===
December 16

Rank	Name	Nationality	Time	Notes
1st place, gold medalist(s)	Rachid Kisri	Morocco	2:17:03	
2nd place, silver medalist(s)	Zäid Laâroussi	Morocco	2:17:18	
3rd place, bronze medalist(s)	Abderrahime Bouramdane	Morocco	2:18:46	
4	Joachim Ralala	Madagascar	2:22:06	
5	Prosper Randriasoalaza	Madagascar	2:23:06	
6	Augusto Gomes	France	2:23:17	
7	Jason Warick	Canada	2:26:19	
8	Ernest Ndissipou	Central African Republic	2:27:24	
9	David Antoine	France	2:27:29	
10	Ken Myers	Canada	2:34:30	
11	Haja Ramananjatovo	Madagascar	2:45:09	
	Hugues Kombila	Gabon	DNF	
	Kabirou Dan Malam	Niger	DNF	
	Bruce Raymer	Canada	DNF	

=== 110 meters hurdles ===
Heats – December 11
Wind:
Heat 1: 0.0 m/s, Heat 2: 0.0 m/s

Rank	Heat	Name	Nationality	Time	Notes
1	1	Cédric Lavanne	France	13.76	Q
2	1	Jared MacLeod	Canada	13.80	Q
3	2	Joseph-Berlioz Randriamihaja	Madagascar	14.20	Q
4	2	Seleke Samake	Senegal	14.26	Q
5	1	Amadou Diouf	Senegal	14.31	Q
6	2	Hamdi Mhirsi	Tunisia	14.41	Q
7	1	Kerfala Camara	Guinea	15.95	q
8	2	Anthony De Sevelinges	Monaco	17.04	q
	1	Claude Godart	Luxembourg	DNS	
	2	Alberto Mondre	Mauritius	DNS	
	2	Dudley Dorival	Haiti	DNS	

Final – December 12
Wind:
+1.7 m/s

Rank	Name	Nationality	Time	Notes
1st place, gold medalist(s)	Cédric Lavanne	France	13.68	
2nd place, silver medalist(s)	Jared MacLeod	Canada	13.70	
3rd place, bronze medalist(s)	Joseph-Berlioz Randriamihaja	Madagascar	14.08	
4	Seleke Samake	Senegal	14.26	
5	Amadou Diouf	Senegal	14.27	
6	Hamdi Mhirsi	Tunisia	14.45	
7	Kerfala Camara	Guinea	15.55	
8	Anthony De Sevelinges	Monaco	16.26	

=== 400 meters hurdles ===
Heats – December 13

Rank	Heat	Name	Nationality	Time	Notes
1	2	Bernabe Bationo	Burkina Faso	51.01	Q
2	1	Abdoulaye Chérif Issa	Benin	51.14	Q
3	2	Ibou Faye	Senegal	51.18	Q
4	1	Jean Antonio Vieillesse	Mauritius	51.46	Q
5	1	Héni Kechi	France	51.77	Q
6	2	Ibrahima Maiga	Mali	51.85	Q
7	2	Salah-Eddine Ghaidi	France	51.88	q
8	2	Emmanuel Youmekoue Toko	Cameroon	51.93	q
9	1	Nasser Dan Matha	Niger	52.33	
10	1	Wesley Rehel	Quebec	52.35	
11	1	El Hadj Seth Mbow	Senegal	52.36	
12	2	Stéphane Borloz	Switzerland	52.91	
13	2	Lensley Juhel	Mauritius	53.45	
14	1	Nabil El Badaoui	Morocco	54.84	

Final – December 14

Rank	Name	Nationality	Time	Notes
1st place, gold medalist(s)	Ibou Faye	Senegal	50.67	
2nd place, silver medalist(s)	Ibrahima Maiga	Mali	50.71	
3rd place, bronze medalist(s)	Bernabe Bationo	Burkina Faso	51.04	
4	Salah-Eddine Ghaidi	France	51.53	
5	Abdoulaye Chérif Issa	Benin	51.59	
6	Jean Antonio Vieillesse	Mauritius	51.66	
7	Héni Kechi	France	51.85	
8	Emmanuel Youmekoue Toko	Cameroon	52.19	

=== 3000 meters steeplechase ===
December 13

Rank	Name	Nationality	Time	Notes
1st place, gold medalist(s)	Hamid Ezzine	Morocco	8:52.73	
2nd place, silver medalist(s)	Abderrahman Mouatassim	Morocco	9:01.03	
3rd place, bronze medalist(s)	Nordine Gezzar	France	9:08.33	
4	Badre Din Zioini	France	9:12.20	
5	Harouna Garba	Niger	9:39.80	
	Alex Genest	Quebec	DNF	

=== 4 x 100 meters relay ===
December 13

Rank	Nation	Competitors	Time	Notes
1st place, gold medalist(s)	Ivory Coast	Tiécoura Kouassi, Siapade Marius Loua, Ben Youssef Meité, Éric Pacôme N'Dri	39.79	
2nd place, silver medalist(s)	France	Yannick Urbino, Thierry Lubin, Christophe Cheval, Jérôme Éyana	40.09	
3rd place, bronze medalist(s)	Mauritius	Arnaud Casquette, Fernando Augustin, Henrico Louis, Ommanandsing Kowlessur	40.28	
4	Senegal	Oumar Loum, Moussa Baldé, Jacques Sambou, Abdourahman Ndour	40.36	
5	Burkina Faso	Douboure Mare, Thierry Adanabou, Siaka Son, Idrissa Sanou	40.51	
6	Cameroon	Pierre Bissek, François Belinga, Emmanuel Youmekoue Toko, Biao Sani	41.12	
7	Niger	David Aliou, Yacouba Bello, Abdoulaye Garba, Idrissa Saadou	41.13	
	Quebec		DNS	

=== 4 x 400 meters relay ===
December 16

Rank	Nation	Competitors	Time	Notes
1st place, gold medalist(s)	Morocco	Younés Frhani, Abdelkrim Khoudri, Younés Belkaifa, Ismail Daif	3:06.87	
2nd place, silver medalist(s)	Mauritius	Jean-François Degrasse, Ommanandsing Kowlessur, Jean Antonio Vieillesse, Fernando Augustin	3:07.18	
3rd place, bronze medalist(s)	Senegal	El Hadj Seth Mbow, Jacques Sambou, Ibou Faye, Cheikh Dramé	3:11.37	
4	France	Héni Kechi, Christophe Cheval, Salah-Eddine Ghaidi, Gregory Kiavue	3:11.97	
5	Niger	Oumarou Moussa, Alou Boubacar, Moumouni Kimba, Nasser Dan Matha	3:15.28	
6	Cameroon	François Belinga, Pierre Bissek, Biao Sani, Emmanuel Youmekoue Toko	3:15.95	
7	Gabon	Wilfried Bingangoye, Kevin Moudouma, Thibault Biwawou, Pal Massamba	3:23.20	

=== 20 kilometers walk ===
December 12

Rank	Name	Nationality	Time	Notes
1st place, gold medalist(s)	Denis Langlois	France	1:30:47	
2nd place, silver medalist(s)	David Boulanger	France	1:31:16	
3rd place, bronze medalist(s)	Hassanine Sebei	Tunisia	1:32:36	
4	Nicolas Perrier	Switzerland	1:36:56	
5	Jocelyn Ruest	New Brunswick	1:39:21	
6	Ngambene Mukwa	Democratic Republic of the Congo	1:56:03	

=== High jump ===
December 16

Rank	Name	Nationality	1.95	2.00	2.05	2.10	2.15	2.20	2.24	2.27	Result	Notes
1st place, gold medalist(s)	Mustapha Raifak	France	–	–	o	o	o	xo	xxo	x	2.24	
2nd place, silver medalist(s)	Kwaku Boateng	Canada	–	–	–	o	o	o	xxx		2.20	
2nd place, silver medalist(s)	Eduard Sebestyén	Romania	–	–	o	o	o	o	xxx		2.20	
4	Jeffrey Caton	Canada	–	o	o	o	o	xxx			2.15	
5	Derek Watkins	Canada	–	o	–	o	xxx				2.10	
6	Serge Foungtcho	Cameroon	o	o	xo	o	xxx				2.10	
7	Boubacar Séré	Burkina Faso	–	o	–	xo	xxx				2.10	
8	Jean-Claude Rabbath	Lebanon	–	–	xo	xo	xxx				2.10	
9	Abdou Mahmane Sani	Niger	o	xo	xxx						2.00	
10	Jean-Paul Masanga-Mekombo	Democratic Republic of the Congo	o	xxx							1.95	
	Koussé Koné	Mali	xxx								NM	

=== Pole vault ===
December 13

Rank	Name	Nationality	4.60	4.80	5.00	5.10	5.20	5.30	5.40	5.50	Result	Notes
1st place, gold medalist(s)	Damiel Dossévi	France	–	–	xo	–	o	–	o	xxx	5.40	
2nd place, silver medalist(s)	Pierre-Charles Peuf	France	–	–	xo	–	xo	o	xxx		5.30	
3rd place, bronze medalist(s)	Robert Hanson	Canada	–	o	xxo	–	xo	xxx			5.20	
4	Andy Miller	Canada	–	o	xo	xxx					5.00	
4	John Zubyck	Canada	–	–	xo	–	xx–	x			5.00	
6	Mohamed Karbib	Morocco	–	xo	xxx						4.80	
6	Karim Sène	Senegal	o	xo	xxx						4.80	
8	François Thenault	Quebec	xxo	xxo	xxx						4.80	
9	David Foley	Quebec	o	xxx							4.60	
9	Michel Genest-Lahaye	Quebec	o	xxx							4.60	
	Jean Galfione	France	–	–	–	xxx					NM	
	Boris Zengaffinen	Switzerland	xxx								NM	

=== Long jump ===
December 12

Rank	Name	Nationality	#1	#2	#3	#4	#5	#6	Result	Notes
1st place, gold medalist(s)	Salim Sdiri	France	x	7.95	7.65	x	7.98	7.89	7.98	
2nd place, silver medalist(s)	Tarik Bouguetaib	Morocco	7.69	x	x	7.67	7.78	x	7.78	
3rd place, bronze medalist(s)	Arnaud Casquette	Mauritius	7.76w	x	x	7.46	x	7.64	7.76w	
4	Dane Magloire	Saint Lucia	7.32	7.69	x	–	7.45	7.69	7.69	
5	Thierry Adanabou	Burkina Faso	x	7.32	7.51	7.57	x	7.50	7.57	
6	Imre Borsi	Romania	7.49	7.23	7.56	7.28	7.31	7.39	7.56	
7	Julien Fivaz	Switzerland	7.30w	x	x	x	x	7.32	7.32	
8	Abdoulaye Garba	Niger	x	7.27	7.04				7.27	
9	Peggy Sita Kihoue	Republic of the Congo	x	7.23	7.11				7.23	
10	Younes Moudrik	Morocco	7.12	7.14	7.08				7.14	
11	Joseph Travis	Saint Lucia	–	6.49	6.61				6.61	
	Yahya Berrabah	Morocco	x	x	x				NM	

=== Triple jump ===
December 14

Rank	Name	Nationality	#1	#2	#3	#4	#5	#6	Result	Notes
1st place, gold medalist(s)	Tarik Bouguetaib	Morocco	16.65	16.91	16.55	x	–	–	16.91	
2nd place, silver medalist(s)	Yahya Berrabah	Morocco	15.79	15.69	15.44	16.44	15.91	–	16.44	
3rd place, bronze medalist(s)	Daniel Donovici	Romania	15.88	16.04	x	16.11	15.94	15.96	16.11	
4	Younes Moudrik	Morocco	15.50	15.92	x	x	15.73	15.99	15.99	
5	Thierry Adanabou	Burkina Faso	15.82	15.55	x	15.56	x	15.27	15.82	
6	Akotia Tchalla	Togo	15.06	15.23	15.53	x	15.28	x	15.53	
7	Joseph Travis	Saint Lucia	x	14.09	x	x	x	x	14.09	
	Mohamed Hamimid	France	x	x	x	x	x	x	NM	
	François Loungou	Central African Republic							DNS	
	Dane Magloire	Saint Lucia							DNS	

=== Shot put ===
December 11

Rank	Name	Nationality	#1	#2	#3	#4	#5	#6	Result	Notes
1st place, gold medalist(s)	Yves Niaré	France	18.31	18.64	x	18.64	x	x	18.64	
2nd place, silver medalist(s)	Stéphane Szuster	France	16.91	16.89	x	17.19	x	16.70	17.19	
3rd place, bronze medalist(s)	Badri Obeid	Lebanon	14.29	14.34	x	14.90	15.49	15.30	15.49	
4	Craig Slaunwhite	Canada	x	13.32	x	14.56	14.25	14.82	14.82	
5	Bonaventure Zonabona	Central African Republic	11.62	11.73	–	–	–	–	11.73	
	James Steacy	Canada							DNS	

=== Discus throw ===
December 12

Rank	Name	Nationality	#1	#2	#3	#4	#5	#6	Result	Notes
1st place, gold medalist(s)	Yves Niaré	France	53.23	54.15	53.70	52.14	x	x	54.15	
2nd place, silver medalist(s)	Bertrand Vili	France	51.41	x	x	x	x	54.05	54.05	
3rd place, bronze medalist(s)	Eric Forshaw	Canada	x	52.74	51.98	52.80	x	52.64	52.80	
4	Nabil Kirame	Morocco	50.22	x	50.04	51.48	51.88	49.42	51.88	
5	James Steacy	Canada	49.23	50.99	x	48.40	48.77	47.43	50.99	
6	Georges Al-Hachem	Lebanon	42.19	44.09	42.75	43.77	42.77	44.21	44.21	

=== Hammer throw ===
December 11

Rank	Name	Nationality	#1	#2	#3	#4	#5	#6	Result	Notes
1st place, gold medalist(s)	James Steacy	Canada	71.17	71.84	x	x	x	71.90	71.90	
2nd place, silver medalist(s)	Christophe Épalle	France	67.90	x	67.37	70.66	71.41	x	71.41	
3rd place, bronze medalist(s)	Cosmin Sorescu	Romania	66.67	67.43	66.16	65.80	x	x	67.43	
4	Joe Woodske	Canada	57.87	x	x	x	56.53	x	57.87	

=== Javelin throw ===
December 16

Rank	Name	Nationality	#1	#2	#3	#4	#5	#6	Result	Notes
1st place, gold medalist(s)	David Brisseault	France	69.86	67.73	70.30	x	71.64	67.47	71.64	
2nd place, silver medalist(s)	Vitoli Tipotio	France	65.47	67.42	67.79	x	x	x	67.79	
3rd place, bronze medalist(s)	Fabio Ramsamy	Mauritius	57.96	65.54	60.21	60.00	59.53	58.68	65.54	
4	Bonaventure Zonabona	Central African Republic	54.90	58.68	x	57.45	51.34	57.67	58.68	

=== Decathlon ===
The highest mark recorded in each event is highlighted in yellow

Rank	Athlete	Nationality	100m	LJ	SP	HJ	400m	110m H	DT	PV	JT	1500m	Points	Notes
1st place, gold medalist(s)	Romain Barras	France	11.25w	7.15	15.35	1.94	49.74	14.50	45.06	4.90	57.88	4:31.02	8046	
2nd place, silver medalist(s)	Nadir El Fassi	France	11.28	6.88	13.52	1.97	51.01	15.90	38.14	4.40	53.45	4:31.17	7307	
3rd place, bronze medalist(s)	Patrick Russel	Canada	11.16w	6.88w	13.35	1.88	50.63	14.74	39.01	4.40	46.55	5:06.66	7097	
4	James Holder	Canada	11.24	6.91w	12.50	1.79	51.12	14.97	37.55	4.20	50.80	4:37.71	7056	
5	Hakim Alaoui	Morocco	11.63	7.00w	11.38	1.97	50.74	15.39	37.75	4.10	46.13	4:27.34	7026	
6	Frédéric Xhonneux	(Wallonia) French Community of Belgium	11.62w	6.93w	12.80	2.03	50.12	19.41	38.05	4.40	52.81	4:20.99	7008	
7	Ahmed Mohamed Saad	Egypt	11.42	6.79w	12.37	1.94	52.22	15.55	39.20	4.00	48.91	4:49.28	6870	
8	Maxwell Evenor	Mauritius	11.39w	7.05	11.89	1.70	53.79	15.98	35.35	3.90	49.47	5:12.70	6360	
	Clifford Caines	Canada	11.61w	6.76	12.86	1.88	51.41	DNS	–	–	–	–	DNF	

== Women's results ==
=== 100 meters ===
Heats – December 11
Wind:
Heat 1: +0.8 m/s, Heat 2: +1.7 m/s, Heat 3: +0.7 m/s

Rank	Heat	Name	Nationality	Time	Notes
1	2	Véronique Mang	France	11.34	Q
2	1	Amandine Allou Affoue	Ivory Coast	11.75	Q
3	3	Carima Louami	France	11.80	Q
4	1	Fabienne Béret-Martinel	France	11.86	Q
5	2	Sarah Tondé	Burkina Faso	11.88	Q
6	1	Nirinaharifidy Ramilijaona	Madagascar	11.91	q
7	3	Makaridja Sanganoko	Ivory Coast	11.92	Q
8	1	Marie-Andrée Leblanc	New Brunswick	12.11	q
9	1	Élisabeth Davin	(Wallonia) French Community of Belgium	12.13	
10	2	Estelle Brou	Ivory Coast	12.18	
11	3	Nadege Essama Foe	Cameroon	12.21	
12	2	Juska Rell Kibouanga	Republic of the Congo	12.26	
13	3	Allyson Howatt	New Brunswick	12.31	
14	2	Nana Blakime	Togo	12.54	
15	1	Mariama Bah	Guinea	12.94	
16	3	Alda Maria da Silva	Guinea-Bissau	13.24	
	1	Kadiatou Camara	Mali	DNS	
	2	Kadidja Ahmat	Chad	DNS	
	2	Melina Kazangba	Central African Republic	DNS	
	3	Yah Koita	Mali	DNS	

Final – December 12
Wind:
+0.3 m/s

Rank	Name	Nationality	Time	Notes
1st place, gold medalist(s)	Véronique Mang	France	11.40	
2nd place, silver medalist(s)	Amandine Allou Affoue	Ivory Coast	11.67	
3rd place, bronze medalist(s)	Fabienne Béret-Martinel	France	11.72	
4	Carima Louami	France	11.73	
5	Sarah Tondé	Burkina Faso	11.82	
6	Makaridja Sanganoko	Ivory Coast	11.95	
7	Nirinaharifidy Ramilijaona	Madagascar	12.07	
8	Marie-Andrée Leblanc	New Brunswick	12.19	

=== 200 meters ===
Heats – December 11
Wind:
Heat 1: +2.4 m/s, Heat 2: 0.0 m/s, Heat 3: +0.5 m/s

Rank	Heat	Name	Nationality	Time	Notes
1	2	Kaltouma Nadjina	Chad	23.21	Q
2	1	Aurélie Kamga	France	23.81	Q
3	2	Phara Anacharsis	France	24.00	Q
4	3	Fabienne Feraez	Benin	24.01	Q
5	3	Aida Diop	Senegal	24.10	Q
6	1	Amandine Allou Affoue	Ivory Coast	24.16	Q
7	2	Esther Akinsulie	Canada	24.45	q
8	3	Louise Ayétotché	Ivory Coast	24.70	q
9	3	Tasha Monroe	Canada	25.24	
10	2	Kadidiatou Traoré	Burkina Faso	25.33	
10	3	Marie-Andrée Leblanc	New Brunswick	25.33	
12	1	Allyson Howatt	New Brunswick	25.39	
12	2	Assetou Bamba	Ivory Coast	25.39	
15	1	Juska Rell Kibouanga	Republic of the Congo	25.60	
16	3	Halima Issoufou	Niger	26.35	
17	2	Gertrud Odono Nchama	Equatorial Guinea	26.86	
	1	Sarah Tondé	Burkina Faso	DNS	
	1	Marie-Victore Mboh	Central African Republic	DNS	
	2	Ruddy Zang Milama	Gabon	DNS	

Final – December 12
Wind:
+0.7 m/s

Rank	Name	Nationality	Time	Notes
1st place, gold medalist(s)	Kaltouma Nadjina	Chad	22.92	
2nd place, silver medalist(s)	Aurélie Kamga	France	23.72	
3rd place, bronze medalist(s)	Phara Anacharsis	France	23.75	
4	Fabienne Feraez	Benin	23.78	
5	Amandine Allou Affoue	Ivory Coast	24.04	
6	Aida Diop	Senegal	24.05	
7	Esther Akinsulie	Canada	24.54	
8	Louise Ayétotché	Ivory Coast	24.59	

=== 400 meters ===
Heats – December 11

Rank	Heat	Name	Nationality	Time	Notes
1	1	Kaltouma Nadjina	Chad	53.11	Q
2	2	Fatou Bintou Fall	Senegal	54.73	Q
3	1	Solen Désert	France	54.81	Q
4	2	Esther Akinsulie	Canada	55.64	Q
5	2	Sandrine Thiébaud-Kangni	Togo	55.80	Q
6	1	Muriel Noah Ahanda	Cameroon	55.84	Q
7	2	Claudine Yemalin	Benin	55.87	q
8	1	Lauren Seibel	Canada	56.08	q
9	2	Souliath Saka	Benin	57.19	
10	1	Tasha Monroe	Canada	57.45	
11	1	Halima Issoufou	Niger	1:01.54	
12	2	Mari Luz Obono Ndong	Equatorial Guinea	1:03.30	
	2	Ginou Etienne	Haiti	DNS	

Final – December 12

Rank	Name	Nationality	Time	Notes
1st place, gold medalist(s)	Kaltouma Nadjina	Chad	52.12	
2nd place, silver medalist(s)	Fatou Bintou Fall	Senegal	52.57	
3rd place, bronze medalist(s)	Solen Désert	France	53.57	
4	Esther Akinsulie	Canada	55.10	
5	Sandrine Thiébaud-Kangni	Togo	55.36	
6	Lauren Seibel	Canada	55.54	
7	Muriel Noah Ahanda	Cameroon	55.56	
8	Claudine Yemalin	Benin	56.11	

=== 800 meters ===
Heats – December 14

Rank	Heat	Name	Nationality	Time	Notes
1	2	Valérie Leheutre	France	2:10.70	Q
2	2	Seltana Ait Hammou	Morocco	2:11.11	Q
3	2	Saida El Mehdi	Morocco	2:11.40	Q
4	2	Noelie Yarigo	Benin	2:11.96	q
5	1	Mihaela Neacșu	Romania	2:13.46	Q
6	1	Halima Hachlaf	Morocco	2:13.60	Q
7	1	Melina Thibodeau	Canada	2:13.70	Q
8	2	Jeanne D'Arc Uwamahoro	Rwanda	2:14.13	q
9	2	Paula McLaughlin	Canada	2:14.52	
10	1	Lamberte Nyabamikazi	Rwanda	2:14.73	
11	1	Marlyse N'Sourou	Gabon	2:18.30	
12	1	Ramatou Ganda	Niger	2:31.05	
	1	Leocadie Nzondonioua	Central African Republic	DNS	

Final – December 16

Rank	Name	Nationality	Time	Notes
1st place, gold medalist(s)	Seltana Ait Hammou	Morocco	2:04.63	
2nd place, silver medalist(s)	Mihaela Neacșu	Romania	2:05.30	
3rd place, bronze medalist(s)	Saida El Mehdi	Morocco	2:06.49	
4	Halima Hachlaf	Morocco	2:09.64	
5	Valérie Leheutre	France	2:09.84	
6	Noelie Yarigo	Benin	2:11.61	
7	Melina Thibodeau	Canada	2:12.24	
	Jeanne D'Arc Uwamahoro	Rwanda	DNS	

=== 1500 meters ===
December 13

Rank	Name	Nationality	Time	Notes
1st place, gold medalist(s)	Seltana Ait Hammou	Morocco	4:34.32	
2nd place, silver medalist(s)	Saida El Mehdi	Morocco	4:34.46	
3rd place, bronze medalist(s)	Mariem Alaoui Selsouli	Morocco	4:35.60	
4	Lamberte Nyabamikazi	Rwanda	4:39.95	
5	Nafissa Harouna	Niger	5:21.83	

=== 5000 meters ===
December 16

Rank	Name	Nationality	Time	Notes
1st place, gold medalist(s)	Zhor El Kamch	Morocco	16:19.71	
2nd place, silver medalist(s)	Bouchra Chaâbi	Morocco	16:21.54	
3rd place, bronze medalist(s)	Christine Bardelle	France	16:38.02	
4	Yamina Bouchaouante	France	16:41.75	
5	Claudia Coliţă	Romania	17:46.80	
6	Aicha Bani	Morocco	18:12.45	
7	Sandrine Kengue	Gabon	18:23.28	
	Angeline Nyiransabimana	Rwanda	DNS	
	Ida-Brunelle Kiyindou	Republic of the Congo	DNS	

=== 10,000 meters ===
December 12

Rank	Name	Nationality	Time	Notes
1st place, gold medalist(s)	Zhor El Kamch	Morocco	33:41.28	
2nd place, silver medalist(s)	Malika Asahssah	Morocco	34:41.23	
3rd place, bronze medalist(s)	Fatima Ayachi	Morocco	34:59.34	
4	Angeline Nyiransabimana	Rwanda	35:32.44	
	Ida-Brunelle Kiyindou	Republic of the Congo	DNF	

=== Marathon ===
December 16

Rank	Name	Nationality	Time	Notes
1st place, gold medalist(s)	Céline Cormerais	France	2:45:28	
2nd place, silver medalist(s)	Eléna Fétizon	France	2:45:28	
3rd place, bronze medalist(s)	Epiphanie Nyirabarame	Rwanda	2:50:13	
4	Clarisse Rasoarizay	Madagascar	2:52:00	
	Hafida Narmouch	Morocco	DNF	

=== 100 meters hurdles ===
Heats – December 14
Wind:
Heat 1: 0.0 m/s, Heat 2: 0.0 m/s

Rank	Heat	Name	Nationality	Time	Notes
1	1	Joanna Bujak	France	13.55	Q
2	2	Élisabeth Davin	(Wallonia) French Community of Belgium	13.97	Q
3	1	Alyma Soura	Burkina Faso	14.13	Q
4	1	Carole Kaboud Mebam	Cameroon	14.19	Q
5	1	Andrea Vinet	Canada	14.22	q
6	2	Émilie Boulleret	France	14.29	Q
7	2	Béatrice Kamboulé	Burkina Faso	14.32	Q
8	2	Kim Reuland	Luxembourg	14.36	q
9	1	Félicité Traoré	Burkina Faso	14.52	
10	2	Solene Eboulabeka	Republic of the Congo	14.59	
	2	Nicole Scherler	Switzerland	DNS	

Final – December 16
Wind:
+1.1 m/s

Rank	Name	Nationality	Time	Notes
1st place, gold medalist(s)	Joanna Bujak	France	13.47	
2nd place, silver medalist(s)	Carole Kaboud Mebam	Cameroon	13.58	
3rd place, bronze medalist(s)	Élisabeth Davin	(Wallonia) French Community of Belgium	13.65	
4	Alyma Soura	Burkina Faso	14.10	
5	Andrea Vinet	Canada	14.20	
6	Kim Reuland	Luxembourg	14.62	
	Émilie Boulleret	France	DNS	
	Béatrice Kamboulé	Burkina Faso	DNS	

=== 400 meters hurdles ===
December 13

Rank	Name	Nationality	Time	Notes
1st place, gold medalist(s)	Sylvanie Morandais	France	58.27	
2nd place, silver medalist(s)	Aissata Soulama	Burkina Faso	58.40	
3rd place, bronze medalist(s)	Aurore Kassambara	France	59.45	
4	Aminata Sylla	Senegal	59.67	
5	Carole Kaboud Mebam	Cameroon	59.95	
6	Hanane Skhyi	Morocco	1:00.27	
7	Clemence Kombeto	Benin	1:00.56	
8	Hayat Lambarki	Morocco	1:02.33	

=== 4 x 100 meters relay ===
December 13

Rank	Nation	Competitors	Time	Notes
1st place, gold medalist(s)	France	Véronique Mang, Fabienne Béret-Martinel, Aurélie Kamga, Carima Louami	44.61	
2nd place, silver medalist(s)	Ivory Coast	Estelle Brou, Makari Sanganoko, Louise Ayétotché, Amandine Allou Affoue	45.36	
3rd place, bronze medalist(s)	Burkina Faso	Mariette Mien, Sarah Tondé, Kadidiatou Traoré, Béatrice Kamboulé	45.99	
4	Madagascar	Tant Fanjanirina, Olga Razanamalala, Nirinaharifidy Ramilijaona, Ginette Bao	46.58	
5	Cameroon	Nadege Essama Foe, Carole Kaboud Mebam, Joséphine Mbarga-Bikié, Muriel Noah Ahanda	46.72	

=== 4 x 400 meters relay ===
December 16

Rank	Nation	Competitors	Time	Notes
1st place, gold medalist(s)	France	Phara Anacharsis, Aurélie Kamga, Aurore Kassambara, Sylvanie Morandais	3:37.91	
2nd place, silver medalist(s)	Canada	Lauren Seibel, Tasha Monroe, Melina Thibodeau, Esther Akinsulie	3:40.96	
3rd place, bronze medalist(s)	Morocco	Saida El Mehdi, Halima Hachlaf, Seltana Ait Hammou, Hanane Skhyi	3:42.48	
4	Cameroon	Carole Kaboud Mebam, Noah Muriele Ahanda, Nadege Essama Foe, Joséphine Mbarga-Bikié	3:46.38	
5	Benin	Souliath Saka, Clemence Kombeto, Noelie Yarigo, Claudine Yemalin	3:47.56	

=== High jump ===
December 12

Rank	Name	Nationality	1.60	1.65	1.70	1.75	1.79	1.83	1.86	Result	Notes
1st place, gold medalist(s)	Whitney Evans	Canada	–	o	o	o	xo	xo	xxx	1.83	
2nd place, silver medalist(s)	Andreea Ispan	Romania	–	–	o	o	xo	xxo	xxx	1.83	
3rd place, bronze medalist(s)	Beatrice Lundmark	Switzerland	–	–	o	o	o	xxx		1.79	
4	Lucie Finez	France	–	o	o	o	xo	xxx		1.79	
5	Annick Barangengana	Quebec	o	o	xo	xxo	xxx			1.75	
6	Émilie Boulleret	France	o	o	xxo	xxx				1.70	
7	Véronique Fortin	Canada	xo	xxo	xxx					1.65	
	Linda Louissant	Haiti								DNS	

=== Pole vault ===
December 12

Rank	Name	Nationality	3.40	3.60	3.75	3.85	3.95	4.05	4.15	4.20	Result	Notes
1st place, gold medalist(s)	Kelsie Hendry	Canada	–	–	–	–	o	–	o	xxx	4.15	
2nd place, silver medalist(s)	Syrine Balti	Tunisia	–	o	–	o	o	o	xxx		4.05	
3rd place, bronze medalist(s)	Amélie Delzenne	France	–	o	–	o	o	xxx			3.95	
4	Elise Duboquet	France	–	o	xo	o	xxx				3.85	
5	Adrianne Vangool	Canada	–	–	xo	xxo	xxx				3.85	
6	Sue Kupper	Canada	–	xxo	xxx						3.60	
7	Nisrine Dinar	Morocco	xo	xxx							3.40	
8	Caroline Jean	Quebec	xxo	xxx							3.40	
	Émilie Lefebvre-Bertrand	Quebec	xxx								NM	

=== Long jump ===
December 16

Rank	Name	Nationality	#1	#2	#3	#4	#5	#6	Result	Notes
1st place, gold medalist(s)	Élise Vesanes	France	6.42	x	x	6.03	x	6.31	6.42	
2nd place, silver medalist(s)	Céline Laporte	Seychelles	6.12	6.14	6.24	6.10	6.20	6.17	6.24	
3rd place, bronze medalist(s)	Alina Militaru	Romania	x	6.12	x	6.12	6.22	x	6.22	
4	Yah Soucko Koita	Mali	5.90	6.08w	5.82	6.13	6.09	5.77w	6.13	
5	Joséphine Mbarga-Bikié	Cameroon	5.99w	5.80	6.12	6.03	x	5.63w	6.12	
6	Estelle Brou	Ivory Coast	x	x	5.77w	x	x	x	5.77w	
7	Pamela Mouele-Mboussi	Republic of the Congo	5.64	x	x	5.26	5.63	5.58	5.64	
8	Véronique Fortin	Canada	5.60	5.19	x	5.56w	5.60w	5.29	5.60	
9	Latifa Ezziraoui	Morocco	5.33	x	x				5.33	
10	Yahanatou Ibrahim	Niger	5.05w	5.20w	5.17w				5.20w	
	Émilie Boulleret	France							DNS	
	Nana Blakime	Togo							DNS	
	Mariama Bah	Guinea							DNS	

=== Triple jump ===
December 11

Rank	Name	Nationality	#1	#2	#3	#4	#5	#6	Result	Notes
1st place, gold medalist(s)	Mariette Mien	Burkina Faso	x	11.85	x	12.59	13.17	13.23	13.23	
2nd place, silver medalist(s)	Latifa Ezziraoui	Morocco	x	13.00	x	12.96	13.18	13.17	13.18	
3rd place, bronze medalist(s)	Béatrice Kamboulé	Burkina Faso	12.74	x	12.91	13.05	x	12.52	13.05	
4	Yah Soucko Koita	Mali	x	11.95	12.56	12.72	12.94	12.78	12.94	
5	Betty Lise	France	x	x	12.77	12.73	x	x	12.77	
6	Pamela Mouele-Mboussi	Republic of the Congo	12.11	x	11.17	12.14	11.98	11.80	12.14	
	Linda Louissant	Haiti							DNS	
	Kéné Ndoye	Senegal							DNS	
	Constanța Ştucan	Romania							DNS	

=== Shot put ===
December 16

Rank	Name	Nationality	#1	#2	#3	#4	#5	#6	Result	Notes
1st place, gold medalist(s)	Jessica Cérival	France	15.73	16.32	15.51	x	x	x	16.32	
2nd place, silver medalist(s)	Elena Hila	Romania	15.72	15.18	x	x	15.93	x	15.93	
3rd place, bronze medalist(s)	Amel Ben Khaled	Tunisia	14.40	x	14.81	14.50	x	14.12	14.81	
4	Caroline Larose	Canada	13.77	14.05	x	x	13.44	13.96	14.05	
5	Brigitte Traoré	Burkina Faso	x	11.28	12.27	9.97	12.62	11.22	12.62	
6	Kim Schartz	Luxembourg	11.76	12.04	11.70	12.12	11.62	12.62	12.62	
7	Émilie Boulleret	France	11.31	x	–	–	–	–	11.31	
8	Monique Djikada	Cameroon	10.00	x	9.47	9.77	x	9.57	10.00	
9	Fatoumata Bah	Guinea	8.53	8.82	8.41				8.82	

=== Discus throw ===
December 14

Rank	Name	Nationality	#1	#2	#3	#4	#5	#6	Result	Notes
1st place, gold medalist(s)	Ileana Brânduşoiu	Romania	52.28	48.89	x	x	49.84	52.04	52.28	
2nd place, silver medalist(s)	Agnes Teppe	France	44.96	43.83	48.33	x	48.73	49.52	49.52	
3rd place, bronze medalist(s)	Kazai Suzanne Kragbé	Ivory Coast	40.05	43.43	x	42.11	48.72	46.88	48.72	
4	Julie Bourgon	Canada	44.91	43.39	44.05	x	46.43	x	46.43	
5	Lindy Leveau	Seychelles	x	x	40.25	x	x	x	40.25	
6	Brigitte Traoré	Burkina Faso	39.60	38.12	39.73	x	x	39.53	39.73	
	Joezme Jadotte	Haiti							DNS	

=== Hammer throw ===
December 13

Rank	Name	Nationality	#1	#2	#3	#4	#5	#6	Result	Notes
1st place, gold medalist(s)	Stéphanie Falzon	France	57.68	61.47	63.40	65.12	x	61.88	65.12	
2nd place, silver medalist(s)	Amélie Perrin	France	49.83	59.27	x	60.44	62.14	64.02	64.02	
3rd place, bronze medalist(s)	Mihaela Melinte	Romania	x	60.22	60.65	61.43	x	61.96	61.96	
4	Crystal Smith	Canada	58.19	x	x	61.57	60.09	59.46	61.57	
5	Michelle Fournier	Quebec	59.19	57.77	59.63	57.63	x	59.86	59.86	
6	Mouna Dani	Morocco	x	54.20	56.78	55.62	55.54	54.95	56.78	
7	Florence Ezeh	Togo	55.65	55.55	55.38	55.73	56.12	x	56.12	
8	Hayat El Ghazi	Morocco	x	x	54.37	48.50	52.68	x	54.37	
9	Megan Reid	Canada	52.57	52.98	53.62				53.62	
10	Nathalie Rheder	France	53.39	x	52.88				53.39	
11	Kate Forbes	Canada	49.58	52.98	49.89				52.98	
12	Rachel Somé	Burkina Faso	x	x	41.36				41.36	

=== Javelin throw ===
December 11

Rank	Name	Nationality	#1	#2	#3	#4	#5	#6	Result	Notes
1st place, gold medalist(s)	Lindy Leveau	Seychelles	52.94	50.51	53.92	x	51.95	52.26	53.92	
2nd place, silver medalist(s)	Séphora Bissoly	France	49.64	51.56	52.56	x	52.71	51.84	52.71	
3rd place, bronze medalist(s)	Karine Hervieu	France	48.65	46.02	x	51.34	x	49.81	51.34	
4	Nadia Vigliano	France	46.36	49.52	49.44	48.66	47.67	50.44	50.44	
5	Dominique Bilodean	Canada	42.89	45.45	46.14	x	x	47.39	47.39	
6	Caroline Larose	Canada	41.73	43.59	45.74	38.17	44.39	46.83	46.83	
7	Monique Djikada	Cameroon	45.42	x	42.79	42.88	41.46	38.67	45.42	
8	Véronique Fortin	Canada	35.32	36.63	36.10	35.82	36.66	36.56	36.66	
