= 1997 European Athletics U23 Championships – Men's 4 × 100 metres relay =

The men's 4 x 100 metres relay event at the 1997 European Athletics U23 Championships was held in Turku, Finland, on 12 and 13 July 1997.

== Medalists ==
Gold	Dan Money; Marlon Devonish; Jamie Henthorn; Julian Golding; Great Britain
Silver	Marcin Krzywański; Dariusz Adamczyk; Piotr Balcerzak; Ryszard Pilarczyk; Poland
Bronze	Alexander Kosenkow; Eduard Martin; Patrick Weimer; Uwe Eisenbeis; Germany

== Results ==
=== Final ===
13 July

Rank	Nation	Competitors	Time	Notes
1st place, gold medalist(s)	Great Britain	Dan Money; Marlon Devonish; Jamie Henthorn; Julian Golding	38.99	
2nd place, silver medalist(s)	Poland	Marcin Krzywański; Dariusz Adamczyk; Piotr Balcerzak; Ryszard Pilarczyk	39.27	
3rd place, bronze medalist(s)	Germany	Alexander Kosenkow; Eduard Martin; Patrick Weimer; Uwe Eisenbeis	39.45	
4	Italy	Francesco Scuderi; Giulio Ibba; Michele Paggi; Alessandro Attene	39.71	
5	France	Jérôme Éyana; David Patros; Ruddy Zami; Sébastien Jamain	39.74	
6	Russia	Aleksandr Rodchenko; Sergey Bychkov; Leonard Koryukov; Sergey Slukin	40.55	
7	Sweden	Niclas Brorström; Niklas Sjöstrand; Mathias Krigh; Peter Häggström	41.27	
	Norway	Kenneth Halhjem; Thomas Mellin-Olsen; Martin Blekkerud; Vegar Hollas	DNF	

=== Heats ===
12 July
Qualified: first 3 in each heat and 2 best to the Final

==== Heat 1 ====
Rank	Nation	Competitors	Time	Notes
1	Poland	Marcin Krzywański; Dariusz Adamczyk; Piotr Balcerzak; Ryszard Pilarczyk	39.56	Q
2	Germany	Alexander Kosenkow; Eduard Martin; Patrick Weimer; Uwe Eisenbeis	40.18	Q
3	Norway	Kenneth Halhjem; Thomas Mellin-Olsen; Martin Blekkerud; Vegar Hollas	40.50	Q
4	Russia	Leonard Koryukov; Sergey Bychkov; Aleksandr Rodchenko; Sergey Slukin	40.54	q
	Spain	José Illán; Venancio José; Diego Santos; Eduardo Ugarte	DNF	

==== Heat 2 ====
Rank	Nation	Competitors	Time	Notes
1	Italy	Gabriele Carubini; Giulio Ibba; Michele Paggi; Francesco Scuderi	39.74	Q
2	France	Jérôme Éyana; David Patros; Ruddy Zami; Sébastien Jamain	39.90	Q
3	Great Britain	Dan Money; Marlon Devonish; Jamie Henthorn; Ross Baillie	39.99	Q
4	Sweden	Niclas Brorström; Niklas Sjöstrand; Mathias Krigh; Peter Häggström	40.37	q
5	Hungary	Gábor Kovács; László Babály; Géza Pauer; Gábor Dobos	40.72	
6	Greece	Panagiótis Sarris; Panagiótis Mandelidis; Vasilios Segos; Georgios Batsikas	41.47	

== Participation ==
According to an unofficial count, 46 athletes from 11 countries participated in the event.

- France (4)
- Germany (4)
- Great Britain (5)
- Greece (4)
- Hungary (4)
- Italy (5)
- Norway (4)
- Poland (4)
- Russia (4)
- Spain (4)
- Sweden (4)
