= 1999 European Athletics U23 Championships – Men's 4 × 100 metres relay =

The men's 4 x 100 metres relay event at the 1999 European Athletics U23 Championships was held in Gothenburg, Sweden, at Ullevi on 31 July and 1 August 1999.

== Medalists ==
Gold	Christian Malcolm; Jamie Henthorn; John Stewart; Mark Findlay; Great Britain
Silver	Jérôme Éyana; Frédéric Krantz; Cédric Gold Daig; David Patros; France
Bronze	Alexander Kosenkow; Stefan Holz; Michael Schäfer; Falk Schrader; Germany

== Results ==
=== Final ===
1 August

Rank	Nation	Competitors	Time	Notes
1st place, gold medalist(s)	Great Britain	Christian Malcolm; Jamie Henthorn; John Stewart; Mark Findlay	38.96	CR
2nd place, silver medalist(s)	France	Jérôme Éyana; Frédéric Krantz; Cédric Gold Daig; David Patros	39.14	
3rd place, bronze medalist(s)	Germany	Alexander Kosenkow; Stefan Holz; Michael Schäfer; Falk Schrader	39.69	
4	Hungary	Balázs Kovács; László Babály; Attila Kilvinger; Attila Farkas	39.73	
5	Spain	Ion Gutiérrez; Israel Nuñez; Orkatz Beitia; José Illán	39.78	
6	Italy	Luca Verdecchia; Massimiliano Donati; Michele Paggi; Francesco Scuderi	39.80	
7	Sweden	Niclas Bronström; Lenny Martinez; Mikael Ahl; Christofer Ohlsson	39.93	
8	Greece	Aristotelis Gavelas; Anastasios Poulioglou; Anastasios Gousis; Christoforos Choidis	39.98	

=== Heats ===
31 July
Qualified: first 3 in each heat and 2 best to the Final

==== Heat 1 ====
Rank	Nation	Competitors	Time	Notes
1	Sweden	Niclas Bronström; Lenny Martinez; Mikael Ahl; Christofer Ohlsson	39.76	Q
2	Spain	Diego Santos; Israel Nuñez; Ion Gutiérrez; José Illán	39.90	Q
3	Hungary	Balázs Kovács; László Babály; Attila Kilvinger; Attila Farkas	39.92	Q
4	Greece	Aristotelis Gavelas; Anastasios Poulioglou; Ioannis Lessis; Christoforos Choidis	40.08	q
5	Portugal	Renato Moura; Pedro Tubal; Vitor Vasconcelos; Hildberto Almeida	40.16	
	Poland	Adam Forgheim; Tomasz Kondratowicz; Leszek Dyja; Marcin Nowak	DNF	

==== Heat 2 ====
Rank	Nation	Competitors	Time	Notes
1	United Kingdom	Christian Malcolm; Jamie Henthorn; John Stewart; Mark Findlay	39.17	Q
2	France	Jérôme Éyana; Frédéric Krantz; Cédric Gold Daig; David Patros	39.58	Q
3	Germany	Alexander Kosenkow; Stefan Holz; Michael Schäfer; Falk Schrader	39.68	Q
4	Italy	Andreas Rubino; Massimiliano Donati; Michele Paggi; Luca Verdecchia	39.99	q
	Netherlands	Timothy Beck; Christoph Kempen; Rowdy Middelkoop; Martijn Ungerer	DQ	
	Czech Republic	Tomáš Černý; Filip Klvaňa; Roman Zubek; Pavel Rada	DNF	

== Participation ==
According to an unofficial count, 51 athletes from 12 countries participated in the event.

- Czech Republic (4)
- France (4)
- Germany (4)
- Great Britain (4)
- Greece (5)
- Hungary (4)
- Italy (5)
- Netherlands (4)
- Poland (4)
- Portugal (4)
- Spain (5)
- Sweden (4)
