= 1999 European Athletics U23 Championships – Men's 5000 metres =

The men's 5000 metres event at the 1999 European Athletics U23 Championships was held in Gothenburg, Sweden, at Ullevi on 1 August 1999.

== Medalists ==
| Gold | Youssef El Nasri; Spain |
| Silver | Marius Bakken; Norway |
| Bronze | Marco Mazza; Italy |

== Results ==
=== Final ===
1 August

| Rank | Name | Nationality | Time | Notes |
|---|---|---|---|---|
| 1st place, gold medalist(s) | Youssef El Nasri | Spain | 13:30.48 | CR |
| 2nd place, silver medalist(s) | Marius Bakken | Norway | 13:31.53 | |
| 3rd place, bronze medalist(s) | Marco Mazza | Italy | 13:47.17 | |
| 4 | Janne Holmén | Finland | 13:53.12 | |
| 5 | Sebastian Hallmann | Germany | 13:56.87 | |
| 6 | Sam Haughian | Great Britain | 13:57.51 | |
| 7 | Adrian Maghiar | Romania | 13:59.48 | |
| 8 | Dmitry Baranovskiy | Ukraine | 13:59.55 | |
| 9 | Adónis Papadónis | Greece | 14:01.41 | |
| 10 | Ernesto Limon | Spain | 14:08.36 | |
| 11 | Mark Miles | Great Britain | 14:19.53 | |
| 12 | Mario Kröckert | Germany | 14:19.68 | |
| 13 | Alexander Lubina | Germany | 14:21.22 | |
| 14 | Jussi Utriainen | Finland | 14:22.37 | |
| | Ovidiu Tat | Romania | DNF | |
| | Khalid Zoubaa | France | DNF | |
| | Christophe Rovello | France | DNF | |
| | Bouabdallah Tahri | France | DNF | |
| | Pablo Villalobos | Spain | DNF | |

== Participation ==
According to an unofficial count, 19 athletes from 10 countries participated in the event.

- Finland (2)
- France (3)
- Germany (3)
- Great Britain (2)
- Greece (1)
- Italy (1)
- Norway (1)
- Romania (2)
- Spain (3)
- Ukraine (1)
