= 1997 European Athletics U23 Championships – Men's 100 metres =

The men's 100 metres event at the 1997 European Athletics U23 Championships was held in Turku, Finland, on 10 and 11 July 1997.

== Medalists ==
Gold	Ángelos Pavlakakis; Greece
Silver	Carlos Calado; Portugal
Bronze	Marlon Devonish; Great Britain

== Results ==
=== Final ===
11 July
Wind: 2.8 m/s

Rank	Name	Nationality	Time	Notes
1st place, gold medalist(s)	Ángelos Pavlakakis	Greece	10.18 w	
2nd place, silver medalist(s)	Carlos Calado	Portugal	10.29 w	
3rd place, bronze medalist(s)	Marlon Devonish	Great Britain	10.32 w	
4	Gábor Dobos	Hungary	10.36 w	
5	Patrik Lövgren	Sweden	10.42 w	
6	Jamie Henthorn	Great Britain	10.46 w	
7	Marcin Krzywański	Poland	10.57 w	
8	Ivan Šlehobr	Czech Republic	10.59 w	

=== Semifinals ===
10 July
Qualified: first 4 in each to the Final

==== Semifinal 1 ====
Wind: 1.5 m/s

Rank	Name	Nationality	Time	Notes
1	Ángelos Pavlakakis	Greece	10.35	Q
2	Marlon Devonish	Great Britain	10.36	Q
3	Gábor Dobos	Hungary	10.40	Q
4	Marcin Krzywański	Poland	10.47	Q
5	David Patros	France	10.50	
6	Patrick Weimer	Germany	10.51	
7	Mário Barbosa	Portugal	10.63	
8	Petko Yankov	Bulgaria	16.16	

==== Semifinal 2 ====
Wind: 3.0 m/s

Rank	Name	Nationality	Time	Notes
1	Carlos Calado	Portugal	10.25 w	Q
2	Patrik Lövgren	Sweden	10.31 w	Q
3	Jamie Henthorn	Great Britain	10.32 w	Q
4	Ivan Šlehobr	Czech Republic	10.36 w	Q
5	Leonard Koryukov	Russia	10.39 w	
6	Jérôme Éyana	France	10.43 w	
7	Piotr Balcerzak	Poland	10.44 w	
8	Cédric Grand	Switzerland	10.47 w	

=== Heats ===
10 July
Qualified: first 3 in each heat and 4 best to the Semifinal

==== Heat 1 ====
Wind: 0.4 m/s

Rank	Name	Nationality	Time	Notes
1	Carlos Calado	Portugal	10.32	Q
2	Piotr Balcerzak	Poland	10.42	Q
3	Patrik Lövgren	Sweden	10.46	Q
4	Leonard Koryukov	Russia	10.50	q
5	Diego Santos	Spain	10.71	
6	Tommy Kafri	Israel	10.77	
7	Francesco Scuderi	Italy	10.78	
8	Vegar Hollas	Norway	10.96	

==== Heat 2 ====
Wind: -1.4 m/s

Rank	Name	Nationality	Time	Notes
1	Marlon Devonish	Great Britain	10.43	Q
2	Patrick Weimer	Germany	10.47	Q
3	Marcin Krzywański	Poland	10.55	Q
4	Jérôme Éyana	France	10.61	q
5	Niklas Sjöstrand	Sweden	10.68	
6	Gabriele Carubini	Italy	10.72	
7	Hans-Peter Welz	Austria	10.95	
8	Christos Magos	Greece	11.36	

==== Heat 3 ====
Wind: 0.6 m/s

Rank	Name	Nationality	Time	Notes
1	Gábor Dobos	Hungary	10.50	Q
2	Ángelos Pavlakakis	Greece	10.53	Q
3	Cédric Grand	Switzerland	10.57	Q
4	Mário Barbosa	Portugal	10.60	q
5	Martin Duda	Czech Republic	10.62	
6	Gabriel Burtea	Romania	10.62	
7	Thomas Mellin-Olsen	Norway	10.69	
8	Uwe Eisenbeis	Germany	10.70	

==== Heat 4 ====
Wind: -0.9 m/s

Rank	Name	Nationality	Time	Notes
1	Ivan Šlehobr	Czech Republic	10.50	Q
2	Jamie Henthorn	Great Britain	10.52	Q
3	David Patros	France	10.54	Q
4	Petko Yankov	Bulgaria	10.56	q
5	José Illán	Spain	10.61	
6	Vitaly Seniv	Ukraine	10.72	
	Sergey Slukin	Russia	DNF	

== Participation ==
According to an unofficial count, 31 athletes from 19 countries participated in the event.

- Austria (1)
- Bulgaria (1)
- Czech Republic (2)
- France (2)
- Germany (2)
- Great Britain (2)
- Greece (2)
- Hungary (1)
- Israel (1)
- Italy (2)
- Norway (2)
- Poland (2)
- Portugal (2)
- Romania (1)
- Russia (2)
- Spain (2)
- Sweden (2)
- Switzerland (1)
- Ukraine (1)
