= 2002 European Athletics Championships – Men's 4 × 100 metres relay =

Relay race at the 2002 European Athletics Championships

Men's 4 × 100 metres relay at the European Athletics Championships
- Venue: Olympic Stadium
- Location: Munich, Germany
- Start date: August 10, 2002
- End date: August 11, 2002
- Winning time: 38.53

Medalists
gold medal	Ukraine
silver medal	Poland
bronze medal	Germany

The men's 4 × 100 metres relay at the 2002 European Athletics Championships were held at the Olympic Stadium on August 10–11.

== Medalists ==
Gold	Silver	Bronze
Ukraine; Kostyantyn Vasyukov; Kostyantyn Rurak; Anatoliy Dovhal; Oleksandr Kaydash	Poland; Ryszard Pilarczyk; Łukasz Chyła; Marcin Nowak; Marcin Urbaś; Piotr Balcerzak	Germany; Ronny Ostwald; Marc Blume; Alexander Kosenkow; Christian Schacht

Note: Great Britain team originally won the gold but was later disqualified for Dwain Chambers' steroid use.

== Results ==
=== Heats ===
Qualification: First 3 of each heat (Q) and the next 2 fastest (q) qualified for the final.

Rank	Heat	Nation	Athlete	Time	Notes
1	2	France	David Patros, Issa-Aimé Nthépé, Jérôme Éyana, Ronald Pognon	38.93	Q, SB
2	2	Poland	Piotr Balcerzak, Łukasz Chyła, Ryszard Pilarczyk, Marcin Nowak	38.98	Q, SB
3	2	Spain	Cecilio Maestra, Angel David Rodríguez, Orkatz Beitia, Carlos Berlanga	39.08	q, SB
4	1	Germany	Ronny Ostwald, Marc Blume, Alexander Kosenkow, Christian Schacht	39.21	Q
5	1	Russia	Aleksandr Smirnov, Sergey Blinov, Aleksandr Ryabov, Sergey Bychkov	39.24	Q
6	1	Ukraine	Kostyantyn Vasyukov, Kostyantyn Rurak, Anatoliy Dovhal, Oleksandr Kaydash	39.24	Q
7	1	Italy	Francesco Scuderi, Alessandro Cavallaro, Maurizio Checcucci, Marco Torrieri	39.28	q
8	1	Finland	Tommi Hartonen, Tuomas Nasi, Stefan Koivikko, Markus Pöyhönen	39.58	
9	2	Estonia	Argo Golberg, Maidu Laht, Martin Vihmann, Erki Nool	39.69	NR
10	1	Slovenia	Rok Predanič, Matic Osovnikar, Bostjan Fridrih, Urban Acman	39.71	
11	1	Greece	Aristotelis Gavelas, Alexandros Kontzos, Vasilios Seggos, Georgios Theodoridis	39.92	
12	1	Sweden	Peter Häggström, Lenny Martinez, Patrik Lövgren, Johan Engberg	39.99	
	2	Netherlands	Martijn Ungerer, Troy Douglas, Timothy Beck, Patrick van Balkom	DNF	
	2	Israel	Kfir Golan, Tommy Kafri, Gideon Jablonka, Aleksandr Porkhomovskiy	DNF	
	2	Great Britain	Christian Malcolm, Darren Campbell, Marlon Devonish, Dwayne Chambers	DQ	

=== Final ===
Rank	Nation	Athletes	Time	Notes
1st place, gold medalist(s)	Ukraine	Kostyantyn Vasyukov, Kostyantyn Rurak, Anatoliy Dovhal, Oleksandr Kaydash	38.53	=NR
2nd place, silver medalist(s)	Poland	Ryszard Pilarczyk, Łukasz Chyła, Marcin Nowak, Marcin Urbaś	38.71	SB
3rd place, bronze medalist(s)	Germany	Ronny Ostwald, Marc Blume, Alexander Kosenkow, Christian Schacht	38.88	
4	France	David Patros, Issa-Aimé Nthépé, Jérôme Éyana, Ronald Pognon	38.97	
5	Spain	Cecilio Maestra, Angel David Rodríguez, Orkatz Beitia, Carlos Berlanga	39.07	
6	Russia	Aleksandr Smirnov, Sergey Blinov, Aleksandr Ryabov, Sergey Bychkov	39.12	
	Italy	Francesco Scuderi, Alessandro Cavallaro, Maurizio Checcucci, Marco Torrieri	DNF	
	Great Britain	Christian Malcolm, Darren Campbell, Marlon Devonish, Dwayne Chambers	DQ	
