= 1999 European Athletics U23 Championships – Men's 10,000 metres =

The men's 10,000 metres event at the 1999 European Athletics U23 Championships was held in Gothenburg, Sweden, at Ullevi on 29 July 1999.

== Medalists ==
Gold	Marco Mazza; Italy
Silver	Janne Holmén; Finland
Bronze	Ovidiu Tat; Romania

== Results ==
=== Final ===
29 July

Rank	Name	Nationality	Time	Notes
1st place, gold medalist(s)	Marco Mazza	Italy	28:39.29	
2nd place, silver medalist(s)	Janne Holmén	Finland	28:40.87	
3rd place, bronze medalist(s)	Ovidiu Tat	Romania	29:26.31	
4	Dmitry Baranovskiy	Ukraine	29:28.68	
5	Mustafa Mohamed	Sweden	29:31.67	
6	Roger Roca	Spain	29:43.28	
7	Oliver Dietz	Germany	29:47.92	
8	Pau Roig	Spain	29:56.87	
9	Iván Hierro	Spain	29:58.72	
10	Simon Wilkinson	United Kingdom	30:03.08	
11	Andres Jones	United Kingdom	30:14.31	
	Wolfgang Giern	Germany	DNF	
	Christian Pflügl	Austria	DNF	

== Participation ==
According to an unofficial count, 13 athletes from 9 countries participated in the event.

- Austria (1)
- Finland (1)
- Germany (2)
- Italy (1)
- Romania (1)
- Spain (3)
- Sweden (1)
- Ukraine (1)
- United Kingdom (2)
