= Assane Diallo =

Senegalese runner

Personal information
- Nationality: Senegalese
- Born: 10 February 1975 (age 51)

Sport
- Sport: Track and field
- Event: 800 metres

Achievements and titles
- Personal best(s): 600 m: 1:15.7 (1999); 800 m: 1:45.11 (1999); 1000 m: 2:19.39 (1999)
Medal record
Men's athletics
Representing Kenya
Jeux de la Francophonie
Silver medal – second place	2005 Niamey	800 m
Bronze medal – third place	1997 Antananarivo	800 m

Assane Diallo (born 10 February 1975) is a Senegalese runner who specializes in the 800 metres.

Diallo finished eighth in 4 x 400 metres relay at the 1999 World Championships, together with teammates Ousmane Niang, Ibou Faye and Ibrahima Wade.

On the individual level, Diallo won a bronze and a silver medal at the Jeux de la Francophonie in 1997 and 2005 respectively. His personal best time is 1:45.11 minutes, achieved in August 1999 in Montauban.
