= Christian Schacht =

German sprinter

Medal record

Men's athletics

Representing Germany

European Championships
Bronze medal – third place	2002 Munich	4×100 m

Christian Schacht (born 24 June 1976) is a retired German sprinter who specialized in the 100 metres.

Schacht won a bronze medal in 4 x 100 metres relay at the 2002 European Championships, with teammates Ronny Ostwald, Marc Blume and Alexander Kosenkow. The team originally finished fourth, but was promoted to third place after performances by Dwain Chambers were disqualified by the IAAF since Chambers admitted the use of performance-enhancing drugs. For the 2002 IAAF World Cup Germany fielded the same team except that Schacht was replaced with Marc Kochan.

His personal best time was 10.38 seconds, achieved in July 2000 in Braunschweig.
