= 2001 European Athletics U23 Championships – Men's 5000 metres =

The men's 5000 metres event at the 2001 European Athletics U23 Championships was held in Amsterdam, Netherlands, at Olympisch Stadion on 15 July.

== Medalists ==
Gold	Yusef El Nasri; Spain
Silver	Dmytro Baranovskyy; Ukraine
Bronze	Balázs Csillag; Hungary

== Results ==
=== Final ===
15 July

Rank	Name	Nationality	Time	Notes
1st place, gold medalist(s)	Yusef El Nasri	Spain	14:02.97	
2nd place, silver medalist(s)	Dmytro Baranovskyy	Ukraine	14:03.67	
3rd place, bronze medalist(s)	Balázs Csillag	Hungary	14:04.84	
4	Miguel Ángel Pinto	Spain	14:05.86	
5	Chris Thompson	United Kingdom	14:06.00	
6	Samuel Haughian	United Kingdom	14:06.03	
7	Mattia Maccagnan	Italy	14:07.58	
8	Álvaro Jiménez	Spain	14:11.02	
9	Hassan Hirt	France	14:11.48	
10	Sergey Ivanov	Russia	14:12.67	
11	Adonios Papadonis	Greece	14:17.17	
12	Michael May	Germany	14:23.68	
13	Radouan El Bami	Germany	14:31.50	
14	Ionut Bura	Romania	14:34.12	
15	Anastassios Fragos	Greece	14:35.64	

== Participation ==
According to an unofficial count, 15 athletes from 10 countries participated in the event.

- France (1)
- Germany (2)
- Greece (2)
- Hungary (1)
- Italy (1)
- Romania (1)
- Russia (1)
- Spain (3)
- Ukraine (1)
- United Kingdom (2)
