= Athletics at the 1999 Summer Universiade – Men's 10,000 metres =

The men's 10,000 metres event at the 1999 Summer Universiade was held on 12 July 1999 at the Estadio Son Moix in Palma de Mallorca, Spain.

== Results ==
Rank	Athlete	Nationality	Time	Notes
1st place, gold medalist(s)	José Manuel Martínez	Spain	29:37.56	
2nd place, silver medalist(s)	Naoki Mishiro	Japan	29:39.14	
3rd place, bronze medalist(s)	Pedro Trejo	Spain	29:47.27	
4	Chris Graff	United States	29:56.73	
5	Hiroyuki Ogawa	Japan	30:00.16	
6	Mārtiņš Alksnis	Latvia	30:11.12	
7	Hu An	China	30:12.32	
8	Mohamed Afaadas	Morocco	30:16.93	
9	Ray Appenheimer	United States	30:23.19	
10	Christian Olsen	Denmark	30:31.51	
	Şeref Ali Imamoğlu	Turkey	DNS	
	Mohamed Abdelnabi	Sudan	DNS	
	John Kanyi	Kenya	DNS	
	Abdellah Bay	Morocco	DNS	
	Micheal Karuiki	Kenya	DNS	
	Marco Mazza	Italy	DNS	
	Mohamed Berima	Sudan	DNS	
	Fecri Idim	Turkey	DNS	
	Christian Madsen	Denmark	DNS	
