= Hristoforos Hoidis =

Greek sprinter (born 1978)

Hristoforos Hoidis (Greek: Χριστόφορος Χοϊδης; born 10 September 1978) is a Greek sprinter who specialized in the 100 metres.

He competed at the 2004 Olympic Games and the 1999 World Championships, but did not reach the final.

His personal best time was 10.14 seconds, achieved in June 2004 in Plovdiv. This ranks him third among Greek 100 metres sprinters, only behind Angelos Pavlakakis and Aristotelis Gavelas.

In 2005 Hoidis was found guilty of doping. He received an IAAF suspension from July 2005 to July 2007.

== Honours ==
| Year | Competition | Venue | Position | Event | Notes |
Representing Greece
| 1994 | World Junior Championships | Lisbon, Portugal | 11th (h) | 4 × 100 m relay | 41.09 |
| 1996 | World Junior Championships | Sydney, Australia | 28th (h) | 100m | 10.76 (wind: +0.9 m/s) |
| 1996 | World Junior Championships | Sydney, Australia | — | 4 × 100 m relay | DQ |
| 1999 | European U23 Championships | Gothenburg, Sweden | 1st | 100m | 10.19 w (wind: 2.8 m/s) |
| 1999 | European U23 Championships | Gothenburg, Sweden | 8th | 4 × 100 m relay | 39.98 |
| 1999 | World Championships | Seville, Spain | 19th (h) | 100 m | 10.21 |
| 2000 | European Indoor Championships | Ghent, Belgium | 9th (sf) | 60 m | 6.67 |
