= Dmytro Baranovskyi =

Ukrainian long-distance runner

Personal information
- Born: July 28, 1979 (age 47) Kyiv, Soviet Union

Sport
- Sport: Long-distance running
Medal record
Representing Ukraine
European U23 Championships
Gold medal – first place	2001 Amsterdam	10,000m
Silver medal – second place	2001 Amsterdam	5000m

Dmytro Baranovskyi or Dmytro Baranovskyy (Ukrainian: Дмитро Барановський; born July 28, 1979) is a male long-distance runner from Ukraine who specialises in the marathon. He represented his country in the event at the 2004 Summer Olympics.

== Career ==
Baranovskyy won the 2005 edition of the annual Fukuoka Marathon, clocking 2:08:29 on December 4, 2005. He set his personal best of 2:07:15 at the competition the following year, but was beaten into the runner-up spot by Haile Gebrselassie. He was also the winner of the 10,000 metres gold medal at the 2001 European Athletics U23 Championships.

He returned to Fukuoka in 2011 and came seventh, the second European to finish after Dmitriy Safronov.

== Achievements ==
Year	Competition	Venue	Position	Event	Notes
Representing Ukraine
1999	European U23 Championships	Gothenburg, Sweden	8th	5000m	13:59.55
1999	European U23 Championships	Gothenburg, Sweden	4th	10,000m	29:28.68
2001	European U23 Championships	Amsterdam, Netherlands	2nd	5000m	14:03.67
2001	European U23 Championships	Amsterdam, Netherlands	1st	10,000m	29:13.36
2003	Frankfurt Marathon	Frankfurt, Germany	5th	Marathon	2:12:47
2004	Hamburg Marathon	Hamburg, Germany	10th	Marathon	2:12:34
2004	Olympic Games	Athens, Greece	—	Marathon	DNF
2004	Frankfurt Marathon	Frankfurt, Germany	6th	Marathon	2:15:03
2005	Hamburg Marathon	Hamburg, Germany	5th	Marathon	2:11:57
2005	Fukuoka Marathon	Fukuoka, Japan	1st	Marathon	2:08:29
2006	Vienna Marathon	Vienna, Austria	3rd	Marathon	2:10:56
2006	Fukuoka Marathon	Fukuoka, Japan	2nd	Marathon	2:07:15
2007	Seoul International Marathon	Seoul, South Korea	6th	Marathon	2:10:51
2008	Lake Biwa Marathon	Otsu, Japan	17th	Marathon	2:16:17
2009	Tokyo Marathon	Tokyo, Japan	7th	Marathon	2:13:17
2009	Fukuoka Marathon	Fukuoka, Japan	3rd	Marathon	2:08:19
2010	Boston Marathon	Boston, United States	17th	Marathon	2:17:15
2010	Fukuoka Marathon	Fukuoka, Japan	6th	Marathon	2:13:40
2011	Fukuoka Marathon	Fukuoka, Japan	7th	Marathon	2:12:08
2012	Fukuoka Marathon	Fukuoka, Japan	10th	Marathon	2:13:23
2013	Warsaw Marathon	Warsaw, Poland	7th	Marathon	2:12:46
2014	Warsaw Marathon	Warsaw, Poland	9th	Marathon	2:12:40
2016	Fukuoka Marathon	Fukuoka, Japan	8th	Marathon	2:11:39
2017	Warsaw Marathon	Warsaw, Poland	7th	Marathon	2:17:18
