= Judo at the 2005 Jeux de la Francophonie =

Judo competition

Judo Judo at the 2005 Jeux de la Francophonie
- Venue: Niamey
- Location: Niamey, Niger
- Date: 2005

Competition at external databases
- Links: JudoInside

At the 2005 Jeux de la Francophonie, the judo events were held in Niamey, Niger. A total of 14 events were contested according to gender and weight division.

== Medal winners ==
=== Men ===
Event	Gold	Silver	Bronze
Extra-lightweight (60 kg)	Baptiste Leroy (FRA)	not awarded	Younes Ahamdi (MAR)
Extra-lightweight (60 kg)	Baptiste Leroy (FRA)	not awarded	Yung Gascard (Wallonia)
Half-lightweight (66 kg)	Amin El Hady (EGY)	Abdou Alassane Dji Bo (NIG)	Stéphane Biez (FRA)
Half-lightweight (66 kg)	Amin El Hady (EGY)	Abdou Alassane Dji Bo (NIG)	Rachid Rguig (MAR)
Lightweight (73 kg)	David Euranie (FRA)	Hamed Ibraim Meité (CIV)	Claudiu Baștea (ROU)
Lightweight (73 kg)	David Euranie (FRA)	Hamed Ibraim Meité (CIV)	Nicholas Tritton (CAN)
Half-middleweight (81 kg)	Youssef Badra (TUN)	Safouane Attaf (MAR)	Karimou Boubacar (NIG)
Half-middleweight (81 kg)	Youssef Badra (TUN)	Safouane Attaf (MAR)	Christophe van Dijck (Wallonia)
Middleweight (90 kg)	Yves-Matthieu Dafreville (FRA)	Abdelhak Tabach (MAR)	Dieudonne Dolassem (CMR)
Middleweight (90 kg)	Yves-Matthieu Dafreville (FRA)	Abdelhak Tabach (MAR)	Hesham Mesbah (EGY)
Half-heavyweight (100 kg)	David Bozouklian (FRA)	Daniel Brata (ROU)	Aly Zein El Sherif (EGY)
Half-heavyweight (100 kg)	David Bozouklian (FRA)	Daniel Brata (ROU)	Carl Trottier (QBC)
Heavyweight (+100 kg)	Jean-Sébastien Bonvoisin (FRA)	Anis Chedly (TUN)	Islam El Shehaby (EGY)
Heavyweight (+100 kg)	Jean-Sébastien Bonvoisin (FRA)	Anis Chedly (TUN)	Mohammed Merbah (MAR)

=== Women ===
Event	Gold	Silver	Bronze
Extra-lightweight (48 kg)	Émilie Lafont (FRA)	Bianca Ockedahl (QBC)	Isabel Latulippe (CAN)
Extra-lightweight (48 kg)	Émilie Lafont (FRA)	Bianca Ockedahl (QBC)	Hanatou Ouelogo (BUR)
Half-lightweight (52 kg)	Ioana Maria Aluaș (ROU)	Delphine Delsalle (FRA)	Hortense Diédhiou (SEN)
Half-lightweight (52 kg)	Ioana Maria Aluaș (ROU)	Delphine Delsalle (FRA)	Clarissa Ebrottie (CIV)
Lightweight (57 kg)	Barbara Harel (FRA)	Séverine Nébié (BUR)	Hajer Barhoumi (TUN)
Lightweight (57 kg)	Barbara Harel (FRA)	Séverine Nébié (BUR)	Jennifer Landry (New Brunswick)
Half-middleweight (63 kg)	Rizlen Zouak (FRA)	Isabelle Pearson (CAN)	Jenny Bonsant (QBC)
Half-middleweight (63 kg)	Rizlen Zouak (FRA)	Isabelle Pearson (CAN)	Keita Fanta (SEN)
Middleweight (70 kg)	Mylene Chollet (FRA)	Stefani Howorun (CAN)	Jocelyn McGrandle (QBC)
Middleweight (70 kg)	Mylene Chollet (FRA)	Stefani Howorun (CAN)	Houda Miled (TUN)
Half-heavyweight (78 kg)	Lucie Louette (FRA)	Yousra Zribi (TUN)	Marylise Lévesque (CAN)
Heavyweight (+78 kg)	Samah Ramadan (EGY)	Sédrine Portet (FRA)	Nihel Cheikh Rouhou (TUN)

=== Medal table ===
Rank	Nation	Gold	Silver	Bronze	Total
1	France (FRA)	10	2	1	13
2	Egypt (EGY)	2	0	3	5
3	Tunisia (TUN)	1	2	3	6
4	Romania (ROU)	1	1	1	3
5	Canada (CAN)	0	2	3	5
5	Morocco (MAR)	0	2	3	5
7	Quebec (QBC)	0	1	3	4
8	Burkina Faso (BUR)	0	1	1	2
8	Ivory Coast (CIV)	0	1	1	2
8	Niger (NIG)*	0	1	1	2
11	(Wallonia) French Community of Belgium	0	0	2	2
11	Senegal (SEN)	0	0	2	2
13	Cameroon (CMR)	0	0	1	1
13	New Brunswick	0	0	1	1
Totals (14 entries)		14	13	26	53

== Doping cases ==
Musedju Epoka from Democratic Republic of Congo who won silver medal in Men's Extra-lightweight (60 kg) category, tested positive after the competition for Furosemide.
