= 2001 European Athletics U23 Championships – Men's 10,000 metres =

The men's 10,000 metres event at the 2001 European Athletics U23 Championships was held in Amsterdam, Netherlands, at Olympisch Stadion on 12 July.

== Medalists ==
Gold	Dmytro Baranovskyy; Ukraine
Silver	Koen Raymaekers; Netherlands
Bronze	Mattia Maccagnan; Italy

== Results ==
=== Final ===
12 July

Rank	Name	Nationality	Time	Notes
1st place, gold medalist(s)	Dmytro Baranovskyy	Ukraine	29:13.36	
2nd place, silver medalist(s)	Koen Raymaekers	Netherlands	29:15.24	
3rd place, bronze medalist(s)	Mattia Maccagnan	Italy	29:15.32	
4	Adonios Papadonis	Greece	29:18.60	
5	Jakub Burghardt	Poland	29:20.44	
6	Alexander Lubina	Germany	29:21.61	
7	Rubén Diz	Spain	29:24.20	
8	Mustafa Mohamed	Sweden	29:25.98	
9	Adam Sutton	United Kingdom	29:28.32	
10	Olivér Bodor	Hungary	29:39.01	
11	Volker Fritsch	Germany	30:14.16	
12	Pablo Angulo	Spain	30:34.64	
13	Rafael Iglesias	Spain	31:41.39	
	Arkadiusz Sowa	Poland	DNF	

== Participation ==
According to an unofficial count, 14 athletes from 10 countries participated in the event.

- Germany (2)
- Greece (1)
- Hungary (1)
- Italy (1)
- Netherlands (1)
- Poland (2)
- Spain (3)
- Sweden (1)
- Ukraine (1)
- United Kingdom (1)
