= Marcin Nowak (sprinter) =

Polish sprinter (born 1977)

Personal information
- Born: 2 August 1977 (age 49) Stalowa Wola, Poland

Sport
- Sport: Track and field
Medal record
Representing Poland
European Championships
Silver medal – second place	2002 Munich	4×100 m
Bronze medal – third place	1998 Budapest	4×100 m

Marcin Nowak (born 2 August 1977) is a former track and field sprint athlete who competed internationally for Poland.

Nowak represented Poland at the 2008 Summer Olympics in Beijing. He competed at the 4 × 100 metres relay together with Marcin Jędrusiński, Dariusz Kuć and Łukasz Chyła. In their qualification heat they did not finish due to a mistake in the baton exchange and they were eliminated.

== Competition record ==
Year	Competition	Venue	Position	Event	Notes
Representing Poland
1998	European Championships	Budapest, Hungary	7th	100 m	10.29
1998	European Championships	Budapest, Hungary	3rd	4 × 100 m relay	38.98
1999	World Indoor Championships	Maebashi, Japan	7th (h)	60 m	6.57
1999	Universiade	Palma, Spain	7th	4 × 100 m relay	39.46
1999	European U23 Championships	Gothenburg, Sweden	2nd	100 m	10.28 w
1999	European U23 Championships	Gothenburg, Sweden	—	4 × 100 m relay	DNF
1999	World Championships	Seville, Spain	30th (qf)	100 m	10.29
1999	World Championships	Seville, Spain	5th	4 × 100 m relay	38.70
2000	Olympic Games	Sydney, Australia	27th (qf)	100 m	10.37
2000	Olympic Games	Sydney, Australia	8th	4 × 100 m relay	38.96
2002	European Championships	Munich, Germany	2nd	4 × 100 m relay	38.71
2005	World Championships	Helsinki, Finland	– (h)	4 × 100 m relay	DNF
2008	Olympic Games	Beijing, China	– (h)	4 × 100 m relay	DNF

== Personal bests ==
Outdoor

- 100 metres – 10.21 (+0.4 m/s) (Kraków 2000)
- 200 metres – 20.51 (+0.1 m/s) (Kraków 2000)

Indoor

- 60 metres – 6.57 (Maebashi 1999)
- 200 metres – 21.32 (Chemnitz 2009)
