= Thierry Lubin =

French sprinter

Personal information
- Born: 10 November 1970 (age 55) Saint-Claude, Guadeloupe
Medal record
Men's athletics
Representing France
European Championships
Silver medal – second place	1998 Budapest	4×100 m

Thierry Lubin (born 10 November 1970 in Saint-Claude, Guadeloupe) is a French sprinter who specializes in the 200 metres.

At the 1998 European Championships he won a silver medal in 4 x 100 metres relay with teammates Christophe Cheval, Frederic Krantz and Needy Guims. As the European champions Great Britain fielded their own World Cup team, the French relay team was selected to represent Europe at the 1998 IAAF World Cup, finishing sixth while Great Britain won the event.

Lubin had won the bronze medal in 200 m at the 1994 Jeux de la Francophonie. His personal best time was 20.55 seconds, achieved in August 1998 in La Chaux-de-Fonds.

== International competitions ==
Year	Competition	Venue	Position	Event	Notes
Representing France
1994	Jeux de la Francophonie	Paris, France	3rd	200 m	21.16
1994	Jeux de la Francophonie	Paris, France	3rd	4 × 100 m relay	39.87
1997	World Championships	Athens, Greece	31st (h)	200 m	20.80
1998	European Championships	Budapest, Hungary	2nd	4 × 100 m relay	38.87
1999	World Championships	Seville, Spain	–	4 × 100 m relay	DNF
2001	Jeux de la Francophonie	Ottawa, Canada	4th	200 m	20.94
2001	Mediterranean Games	Radès, Tunisia	6th	200 m	21.17
2001	Mediterranean Games	Radès, Tunisia	2nd	4 × 100 m relay	39.73
2005	Jeux de la Francophonie	Niamey, Niger	16th (sf)	100 m	10.91
