= Aristotelis Gavelas =

Greek sprinter

Personal information
- Born: 10 November 1978 (age 47)

Sport
- Country: Greece
- Sport: Athletics
- Events: 100m, 60m

Achievements and titles
- Personal bests: 10.14 sec, 6.60 sec
Medal record
Mediterranean Games
Gold medal – first place	2001 Rades	100 metres

Aristotelis ("Aris") Gavelas (Greek: Αριστοτέλης Γκαβέλας, born 10 November 1978) is a retired Greek sprinter who specialized in the 100 metres.

He finished sixth at the 2002 European Championships and won the gold medal at the 2001 Mediterranean Games, the latter in a career best time of 10.14 seconds. In Greece only Angelos Pavlakakis has run faster. Gavelas also competed at the 2003 World Indoor Championships without reaching the finals.

== Honours ==
Year	Competition	Venue	Position	Event	Notes
Representing Greece
1999	European U23 Championships	Gothenburg, Sweden	11th (h)	100m	10.50 (wind: +1.6 m/s)
1999	European U23 Championships	Gothenburg, Sweden	8th	4 × 100 m relay	39.98
2001	Mediterranean Games	Rades, Tunisia	1st	100 m	10.14 w
2001	Mediterranean Games	Rades, Tunisia	4th	4 × 100 m relay	40.22
2002	European Championships	Munich, Germany	6th	100 m	10.36
2002	European Championships	Munich, Germany	11th (sf)	4 × 100 m relay	39.92
2003	World Indoor Championships	Birmingham, United Kingdom	22nd (h)	60 m	6.72
