= Christophe Cheval =

French sprinter

Medal record

Men's athletics

Representing France

European Championships
Silver medal – second place	1998 Budapest	4×100 m

Bokristophe Cheval (born 25 February 1971 in Somain, Nord) is a French sprinter who specialized in the 200 metres.

At the 1998 European Championships he finished sixth in his main event and won a silver medal in 4 x 100 metres relay with teammates Thierry Lubin, Frederic Krantz and Needy Guims. As the European champions Great Britain fielded their own World Cup team, the French relay team was selected to represent Europe at the 1998 IAAF World Cup, finishing sixth while Great Britain won the event.

Cheval later finished fifth in relay at the 2000 Summer Olympics, this time with teammates Krantz, Guims and David Patros. He also reached the semifinals of the World Indoor Championships in 1997 and 1999. His personal best time was 20.41 seconds, achieved in July 1998 in Dijon.

In 2001 Cheval was found guilty of nandrolone doping. The sample was delivered at the 2001 World Championships in Edmonton, Canada. He received an IAAF suspension from January 2002 to January 2004.

== See also ==
- List of sportspeople sanctioned for doping offences
