= Véronique Fortin =

Canadian cyclist

Personal information
- Born: 22 January 1980 (age 46) Saint-Georges, Quebec, Canada

Cycling career
- Sport: Cycling
- Role: Rider

Véronique Fortin (born 22 January 1980) is a Canadian racing cyclist originally from St Georges de Beauce, Quebec, Canada. Currently sponsored by Opus bike, she won the Canadian Road National Championship in 2011. She was a member of Team TIBCO in 2012 and finished 36th in the 2012 Giro della Toscana. She won the woman's 2012 Ontario Hell of the North race as well as the 2012 Tour of the Battenkill. In 2013, she joined the Italian road team Pasta Zara-Cogeas-Manhattan. She competed in the 2013 UCI women's road race in Florence. She won the women's 2014 Haute Route Alps (904 km with 21,400m of climbs) as well as the women's 2015 Haute Route Dolomites Swiss Alps (906 km with 19,700 meters of climbs). She won the women's 2015 Mt Washington Auto Road Bicycle Hillclimb. She won the women's 2015 100 km Wilmington Whiteface MTB.

In non-cycling sports she came in first place in the 27 km freestyle 2014 Gatineau Loppet and repeated her win in 2015 with the 42 km freestyle Gatineau Loppet, Canada's largest cross-country ski race. She also placed 1st in the female 30–34, 15 km freestyle Winter World Masters Games 2015 in Quebec City.
