= Ghyd-Kermeliss-Holly Olonghot =

Ghyd-Kermeliss-Holly Olonghot (born March 15, 1986, in Brazzaville) is a track and field sprint athlete who competes internationally for the Republic of the Congo.

Olonghot represented Congo at the 2008 Summer Olympics in Beijing. He competed at the 100 metres sprint and placed 7th in his heat without advancing to the second round. He ran the distance in a time of 11.01 seconds.
