= Keita Fanta =

Senegalese judoka

Personal information
- Born: 8 May 1981
- Died: 30 October 2006 (aged 25) Rabat, Morocco

Sport
- Country: Senegal
- Sport: Judo
Medal record
Judo
Representing Senegal
African Championships
Gold medal – first place	2005 Port Elizabeth	Women's -63kg
Bronze medal – third place	2004 Tunis	Women's -63kg
Bronze medal – third place	2006 Mauritius	Women's -63kg

Fanta Keita (8 May 1981 – 30 October 2006) was a Senegalese judoka. She was an African champion in 2005, and a Senegal champion twice, in 2000 and 2005.

Keita died following a training accident.
