= Marco Mazza =

Italian long-distance runner

Personal information
- Nationality: Italian
- Born: 25 June 1977 (age 49) Naples, Italy

Sport
- Country: Italy
- Sport: Athletics
- Event: Long-distance running

Achievements and titles
- Personal best: Half marathon: 1:00.24 (2002)
Medal record
Senior level (individual)
Event	1st	2nd	3rd
European 10,000m Cup	0	0	1

Marco Mazza (born 25 June 1977) is an Italian long-distance runner who specializes in the 10,000 metres and half marathon.

== Biography ==
His personal best time in the 10,000 metres is 27:44.05 minutes, achieved in April 2002 in Camaiore. This places him ninth on the Italian all-time performers list, behind Salvatore Antibo, Francesco Panetta, Venanzio Ortis, Daniele Meucci, Alberto Cova, Franco Fava, Stefano Mei, Stefano Baldini. His personal best half marathon time is 60:24 minutes, achieved in April 2002 in Milan.

== Achievements ==
Year	Competition	Venue	Position	Event	Notes
Representing Italy
1999	European U23 Championships	Gothenburg, Sweden	3rd	5000m	13:47.17
1999	European U23 Championships	Gothenburg, Sweden	1st	10,000m	28:39.29
2000	World Half Marathon Championships	Veracruz, Mexico	9th	Half marathon	1:04:26
2000	World Half Marathon Championships	Veracruz, Mexico	5th	Team	3:19:21
2001	World Championships	Edmonton, Canada	14th	10,000 m	28:08.00
2001	Mediterranean Games	Tunis, Tunisia	4th	10,000 m	29:38.22
2002	European Championships	Munich, Germany	7th	10,000 m	28:05.94
2002	World Half Marathon Championships	Brussels, Belgium	14th	Half marathon	1:02:21
2002	World Half Marathon Championships	Brussels, Belgium	5th	Team	3:07:53

== See also ==
- Italian all-time lists - Half marathon
