= Nirinaharifidy Ramilijaona =

Malagasy sprinter

Nirinaharifidy Ramilijaona (born November 26, 1982) is a track and field sprint athlete who competes internationally for Madagascar.

Ramilijaona represented Madagascar at the 2008 Summer Olympics in Beijing. She competed at the 100 metres sprint and placed fifth in her heat without advancing to the second round. She ran the distance in a time of 12.07 seconds.
