= 1998 European Athletics Championships =

17th European Athletics Championships
- Dates: 18–23 August
- Host city: Budapest, Hungary
- Level: Senior
- Type: Outdoor
- Events: 46
- Participation: 44 nations

The 17th European Athletics Championships were held from 18 August to 23 August 1998 in Budapest, the capital city of Hungary.

== Men's results ==
=== Track ===
1990 |1994 |1998 |2002 |2006 |

Event	Gold		Silver		Bronze	
100 m	Darren Campbell; Great Britain	10.04	Dwain Chambers; Great Britain	10.10	Haralabos Papadias; Greece	10.17
200 m	Douglas Walker; Great Britain	20.53	Douglas Turner; Great Britain	20.64	Julian Golding; Great Britain	20.72
400 m	Iwan Thomas; Great Britain	44.52	Robert Maćkowiak; Poland	45.04	Mark Richardson; Great Britain	45.14
800 m	Nils Schumann; Germany	1:44.89	André Bucher; Switzerland	1:45.04	Lukáš Vydra; Czech Republic	1:45.23
1500 m	Reyes Estévez; Spain	3:41.31	Rui Silva; Portugal	3:41.84	Fermín Cacho; Spain	3:42.43
5000 m	Isaac Viciosa; Spain	13:37.46	Manuel Pancorbo; Spain	13:38.03	Mark Carroll; Ireland	13:38.15
10,000 m	António Pinto; Portugal	27:48.62	Dieter Baumann; Germany	27:56.75	Stéphane Franke; Germany	27:59.90
Marathon	Stefano Baldini; Italy	2:12:01	Danilo Goffi; Italy	2:12:11	Vincenzo Modica; Italy	2:12:53
110 metres hurdles	Colin Jackson; Great Britain	13.02	Falk Balzer; Germany	13.12	Robin Korving; Netherlands	13.20
400 metres hurdles	Paweł Januszewski; Poland	48.18	Ruslan Mashchenko; Russia	48.25	Fabrizio Mori; Italy	48.71
3000 metres steeplechase	Damian Kallabis; Germany	8:13.10	Alessandro Lambruschini; Italy	8:16.70	Jim Svenøy; Norway	8:18.97
20 kilometres walk	Ilya Markov; Russia	1:21:10	Aigars Fadejevs; Latvia	1:21:29	Paquillo Fernández; Spain	1:21:39
50 kilometres walk	Robert Korzeniowski; Poland	3:43:51	Valentin Kononen; Finland	3:44:29	Andrey Plotnikov; Russia	3:45:53
4 × 100 metres relay	Allyn Condon; Darren Campbell; Douglas Walker; Julian Golding; Great Britain	38.52	Thierry Lubin; Frédéric Krantz; Christophe Cheval; Needy Guims; France	38.87	Marcin Krzywański; Marcin Nowak; Piotr Balcerzak; Ryszard Pilarczyk; Poland	38.98
4 × 400 metres relay	Mark Hylton; Jamie Baulch, Iwan Thomas; Mark Richardson; Great Britain	2.58.68	Piotr Rysiukiewicz; Tomasz Czubak; Piotr Haczek; Robert Maćkowiak; Poland	2:58.88	Antonio Andres; Juan Trull; Andrés Martinez; David Canal; Spain	3:02.47

=== Field ===
1990 |1994 |1998 |2002 |2006 |

Event	Gold		Silver		Bronze	
High jump	Artur Partyka; Poland	2.34	Dalton Grant; Great Britain	2.34	Sergey Klyugin; Russia	2.32
Long jump	Kirill Sosunov; Russia	8.28	Bogdan Ţăruş; Romania	8.21	Petar Dachev; Bulgaria	8.06
Pole vault	Maksim Tarasov; Russia	5.81	Tim Lobinger; Germany	5.81	Jean Galfione; France	5.76
Triple jump	Jonathan Edwards; Great Britain	17.99	Denis Kapustin; Russia	17.45	Rostislav Dimitrov; Bulgaria	17.26
Shot put	Oleksandr Bagach; Ukraine	21.17	Oliver-Sven Buder; Germany	20.98	Yuriy Bilonoh; Ukraine	20.92
Discus throw	Lars Riedel; Germany	67.07	Jürgen Schult; Germany	66.69	Virgilijus Alekna; Lithuania	66.46
Javelin throw	Steve Backley; Great Britain	89.72	Mick Hill; Great Britain	86.92	Raymond Hecht; Germany	86.63
Hammer throw	Tibor Gécsek; Hungary	82.87	Balázs Kiss; Hungary	81.26	Karsten Kobs; Germany	80.13
Decathlon	Erki Nool; Estonia	8667	Eduard Hämäläinen; Finland	8587	Lev Lobodin; Russia	8571

== Women's results ==
=== Track ===
1990 |1994 |1998 |2002 |2006 |

Event	Gold		Silver		Bronze	
100 metres	Christine Arron; France	10.73; ER	Irina Privalova; Russia	10.83	Ekaterini Thanou; Greece	10.87
200 metres	Irina Privalova; Russia	22.62	Zhanna Pintusevich; Ukraine	22.74	Melanie Paschke; Germany	22.78
400 metres	Grit Breuer; Germany	49.93	Helena Fuchsová; Czech Republic	50.21	Olga Kotlyarova; Russia	50.38
800 metres	Yelena Afanasyeva; Russia	1:58.50	Malin Ewerlöf; Sweden	1:59.61	Stephanie Graf; Austria	2:00.11
1500 metres	Svetlana Masterkova; Russia	4:11.91	Carla Sacramento; Portugal	4:12.62	Anita Weyermann; Switzerland	4:13.06
5000 metres	Sonia O'Sullivan; Ireland	15:06.50	Gabriela Szabo; Romania	15:08.31	Marta Domínguez; Spain	15:10.54
10,000 metres	Sonia O'Sullivan; Ireland	31:29.33	Fernanda Ribeiro; Portugal	31:32.42	Lidia Șimon; Romania	31:32.64
Marathon	Manuela Machado; Portugal	2:27:10	Madina Biktagirova; Russia	2:28:01	Maura Viceconte; Italy	2:28:31
100 metres hurdles	Svetla Dimitrova; Bulgaria	12.56	Brigita Bukovec; Slovenia	12.65	Irina Korotya; Russia	12.85
400 metres hurdles	Ionela Târlea; Romania	53.37	Tetyana Tereshchuk; Ukraine	54.07	Silvia Rieger; Germany	54.45
10 kilometres walk	Annarita Sidoti; Italy	42:49	Erica Alfridi; Italy	42:54	Susana Feitor; Portugal	42:55
4 × 100 metres relay	Katia Benth; Frédérique Bangué; Sylviane Félix; Christine Arron; France	42.59	Melanie Paschke; Gabi Rockmeier; Birgit Rockmeier; Andrea Philipp; Germany	42.68	Oksana Ekk; Galina Malchugina; Natalya Voronova; Irina Privalova; Russia	42.73
4 × 400 metres relay	Anke Feller; Uta Rohländer; Silvia Rieger; Grit Breuer; Germany	3:23.03	Natalya Khrushcheleva; Svetlana Goncharenko; Yekaterina Bakhvalova; Olga Kotlyarova; Russia	3:23.56	Donna Fraser; Vikki Jamison; Katharine Merry; Allison Curbishley; Great Britain	3:25.66

=== Field ===
1990 |1994 |1998 |2002 |2006 |

Event	Gold		Silver		Bronze	
High jump	Monica Dinescu; Romania	1.97	Donata Jancewicz; Poland	1.95	Alina Astafei; Germany	1.95
Long jump	Heike Drechsler; Germany	7.16	Fiona May; Italy	7.11	Lyudmila Galkina; Russia	7.06
Pole vault	Anzhela Balakhonova; Ukraine	4.31	Nicole Humbert; Germany	4.31	Yvonne Buschbaum; Germany	4.31
Triple jump	Olga Vasdeki; Greece	14.55	Šárka Kašpárková; Czech Republic	14.53	Tereza Marinova; Bulgaria	14.50
Shot put	Vita Pavlysh; Ukraine	21.69	Irina Korzhanenko; Russia	19.71	Yanina Karolchik; Belarus	19.23
Discus throw	Franka Dietzsch; Germany	67.49	Natalya Sadova; Russia	66.94	Nicoleta Grasu; Romania	65.94
Javelin throw	Tanja Damaske; Germany	69.10	Tatyana Shikolenko; Russia	66.92	Mikaela Ingberg; Finland	64.92
Hammer throw	Mihaela Melinte; Romania	71.17	Olga Kuzenkova; Russia	69.28	Kirsten Münchow; Germany	65.61
Heptathlon	Denise Lewis; Great Britain	6559	Urszula Włodarczyk; Poland	6460	Natallia Sazanovich; Belarus	6410

== Medal table ==
* Host nation (Hungary)

Rank	Nation	Gold	Silver	Bronze	Total
1	Great Britain	9	4	3	16
2	Germany	8	7	8	23
3	Russia	6	9	7	22
4	Poland	3	4	1	8
5	Romania	3	2	2	7
6	Ukraine	3	2	1	6
7	Italy	2	4	3	9
8	Portugal	2	3	1	6
9	Spain	2	1	4	7
10	France	2	1	1	4
11	Ireland	2	0	1	3
12	Hungary*	1	1	0	2
13	Bulgaria	1	0	3	4
14	Greece	1	0	2	3
15	Estonia	1	0	0	1
16	Czech Republic	0	2	1	3
16	Finland	0	2	1	3
18	Switzerland	0	1	1	2
19	Latvia	0	1	0	1
19	Slovenia	0	1	0	1
19	Sweden	0	1	0	1
22	Belarus	0	0	2	2
23	Austria	0	0	1	1
23	Lithuania	0	0	1	1
23	Netherlands	0	0	1	1
23	Norway	0	0	1	1
Totals (26 entries)		46	46	46	138

== See also ==
- 1998 in athletics (track and field)

== Notes ==
Differences to competition format since the 1994 European Championships

New events added:

  - Women's 5000 m replaces the 3000 m
  - Women's Pole Vault
  - Women's Hammer Throw
