= Élise Duboquet =

French pole vaulter

Élise Duboquet (born 18 November 1981) is a French athlete, who specializes in the Pole vault.

== Prize list ==
France Championships

- silver medal at the national track championships with a leap of 3.90 m in 2006 at Lamballe
- bronze medal at the national track championships with a leap of 4.10 m in 2005 at Angers

Regional Championships

- 1st in Pole Vault with a jump of 3.90 m Indoors in 2006 at Lievin
- 1st in Pole Vault with a jump of 4.00 m in 2005 at Lomme
- 2nd Indoors Pole Vault in 2005 at Lievin

== Records ==
- Pole Vault = 4.10 m

== Other ==
Élise was elected Miss Flanders and 4th runner up in the national election of Miss France 2001.
