= Alexander Kosenkow =

German sprinter (born 1977)

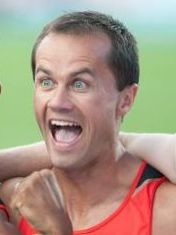
- Kosenkow at the 2010 European Championships

Personal information
- Born: 14 March 1977 (age 49) Tokmok, Kyrgyz SSR, Soviet Union
- Height: 1.78 m (5 ft 10 in)
- Weight: 72 kg (159 lb)

Sport
- Country: Germany
- Sport: Athletics
- Event: 4 × 100 m relay
Medal record
Men's athletics
Representing Germany
European Championships
Silver medal – second place	2012 Helsinki	4 × 100 m relay
Silver medal – second place	2014 Zürich	4 × 100 m relay
Bronze medal – third place	2010 Barcelona	4 × 100 m relay
Bronze medal – third place	2002 Munich	4 × 100 m relay

Alexander Kosenkow (Russian: Александр Косенков; born 14 March 1977) is a German sprinter who specialises in the 100 metres. He represents the sports club TV Wattenscheid.

== Biography ==
Kosenkow was born in Tokmok, Kirghiz SSR, but represented Germany at the 2008 Summer Olympics in Beijing.

In 1991, Alexander Kosenkow, whose mother is a Kyrgyz-German, came to Germany as an emigrant and found a new home in Neuenkirchen-Vörden.

He competed at the 4 × 100 metres relay together with Tobias Unger, Till Helmke and Martin Keller. In their qualification heat they placed third behind Jamaica and Canada, but in front of China. Their time of 38.93 was the sixth fastest out of sixteen participating nations in the first round and they qualified for the final. There they sprinted to a time of 38.58 seconds, which was the fifth time.

== Achievements ==
Year	Competition	Venue	Position	Event	Notes
Representing Germany
1995	European Junior Championships	Nyíregyháza, Hungary	3rd	4 × 100 m relay	40.29
1997	European U23 Championships	Turku, Finland	3rd	4 × 100 m relay	39.45
1999	European U23 Championships	Gothenburg, Sweden	10th (sf)	100 m	10.60 (wind: +0.7 m/s)
1999	European U23 Championships	Gothenburg, Sweden	3rd	4 × 100 m relay	39.69
2002	European Championships	Munich, Germany	3rd	4 × 100 m relay	38.88
2005	World Championships	Helsinki, Finland	7th	4 × 100 m relay	38.48 (SB)
2012	European Championships	Helsinki, Finland	2nd	4 × 100 m relay	38.44
2015	World Championships	Beijing, China	4th	4 × 100 m relay	38.15

=== Personal bests ===
- 100 m: 10.14 s (2003) - seventh on the German all-time list, behind Frank Emmelmann, Thomas Schröder, Sven Matthes, Eugen Ray, Steffen Bringmann and Marc Blume.
- 200 m: 20.55 s (2004)

== See also ==
- German all-time top lists - 100 metres
