= Thomas Mellin-Olsen =

Norwegian long jumper

Thomas Mellin-Olsen (born 8 November 1977) is a Norwegian long jumper. He represents IL Gular.

He finished twelfth in the long jump final at the 2002 European Championships with a jump of 7.57 metres. He also competed at the 1998 European Championships for the 4 x 100 metres relay team that did not progress to the final heat. He never competed at the Summer Olympics. He became Norwegian champion in long jump in the years 2002-2005 and in standing high jump in 2006.

His personal best jump was 7.91 metres, achieved in June 2002 in Banská Bystrica. This result places him third among Norwegian long jumpers, only behind Kristen Fløgstad and Finn Bendixen.
