= László Babály =

Hungarian sprinter

Personal information
- Nationality: Hungarian
- Born: 13 November 1977 (age 48) Debrecen, Hungary

Sport
- Sport: Sprinting
- Event: 4 × 100 metres relay

László Babály Jr. (born 13 November 1977) is a Hungarian sprinter. He competed in the men's 4 × 100 metres relay at the 2000 Summer Olympics. His father also represented Hungary in the 4 × 100 metres relay at the 1980 Summer Olympics.
