= 1999 European Athletics U23 Championships =

2nd European Athletics U23 Championships
- Dates: 29 July - 1 August 1999
- Host city: Gothenburg, Sweden
- Venue: Ullevi
- Level: U23
- Type: Outdoor
- Events: 43
- Participation: 726 athletes from 42 nations

The 2nd European Athletics U23 Championships were held in Gothenburg, Sweden, at Ullevi from 29 July to 1 August 1999.

Complete results and medal winners were published.

== Results ==
=== Men ===
Event	Gold		Silver		Bronze	
100 metres	Hristoforos Hoidis; Greece	10.19	Marcin Nowak; Poland	10.28	Christian Malcolm; Great Britain	10.28
200 metres	John Ertzgaard; Norway	20.47	Christian Malcolm; Great Britain	20.47	Stefan Holz; Germany	20.69
400 metres	Piotr Haczek; Poland	45.78	Zsolt Szeglet; Hungary	46.09	Marc Raquil; France	46.18
800 metres	Nils Schumann; Germany	1:45.21	James Nolan; Ireland	1:46.94	Paweł Czapiewski; Poland	1:46.98
1500 metres	Rui Silva; Portugal	3:44.29	Gert-Jan Liefers; Netherlands	3:44.60	Mehdi Baala; France	3:45.41
5000 metres	Yousef El Nasri; Spain	13:30.48	Marius Bakken; Norway	13:31.53	Marco Mazza; Italy	13:47.17
10,000 metres	Marco Mazza; Italy	28:39.29	Janne Holmén; Finland	28:40.87	Ovidiu Tat; Romania	29:26.31
110 metres hurdles	Tomasz Ścigaczewski; Poland	13.36	Staņislavs Olijars; Latvia	13.55	Jan Schindzielorz; Germany	13.71
400 metres hurdles	Thomas Goller; Germany	49.67	Boris Gorban; Russia	49.94	Periklis Iakovakis; Greece	49.97
3000 metres steeplechase	Günther Weidlinger; Austria	8:30.34	Gael Pencreach; France	8:35.60	Antonio David Jiménez; Spain	8:37.29
20 kilometres walk	David Márquez; Spain	1:23:42	Semyon Lovkin; Russia	1:24:04	Alfio Corsaro; Italy	1:24:25
4 × 100 metres relay	Great Britain; Christian Malcolm; Jamie Henthorn; John Stewart; Mark Findlay	38.96	France; Jérôme Éyana; Frédéric Krantz; Cédric Gold Dalg; David Patros	39.14	Germany; Alexander Kosenkow; Stefan Holz; Michael Schäfer; Falk Schrader	39.69
4 × 400 metres relay	Germany; Sebastian Debnar-Daumler; Thomas Goller; Nils Schumann; Stefan Holz	3:02.96	Poland; Michał Węglarski; Piotr Długosielski; Mariusz Bizoń; Piotr Haczek	3:03.22	Great Britain; Geoff Dearman; Matthew Elias; Peter Brend; David Naismith	3:03.58
High jump	Ben Challenger; Great Britain	2.30	Andriy Sokolovskyy; Ukraine	2.28	Javier Bermejo; Spain	2.22
Pole vault	Romain Mesnil; France	5.93	Lars Börgeling; Germany	5.80	Vasiliy Gorshkov; Russia	5.60
Long jump	Yago Lamela; Spain	8.36	Vitaliy Shkurlatov; Russia	8.02	Nathan Morgan; Great Britain	7.99
Triple jump	Ionut Punga; Romania	16.73	Colomba Fofana; France	16.57	Vasil Gergov; Bulgaria	16.53
Shot put	Mikuláš Konopka; Slovakia	19.60	Joachim Olsen; Denmark	19.50	Jarkko Haukijärvi; Finland	19.15
Discus throw	Aliaksandr Malashevich; Belarus	63.78	Roland Varga; Hungary	61.99	Mario Pestano; Spain	61.73
Hammer throw	Vladyslav Piskunov; Ukraine	76.26	András Haklits; Croatia	73.73	Maciej Pałyszko; Poland	73.50
Javelin throw	Harri Haatainen; Finland	83.02	Ville Räsänen; Finland	78.36	Mark Frank; Germany	77.62
Decathlon	Attila Zsivoczky; Hungary	8379	Boris Kawohl; Germany	7815	Dmitri Ivanov; Russia	7787

=== Women ===
Event	Gold		Silver		Bronze	
100 metres	Manuela Levorato; Italy	11.26	Olena Pastushenko; Ukraine	11.33	Kim Gevaert; Belgium	11.39
200 metres	Manuela Levorato; Italy	22.68	Muriel Hurtis; France	22.85	Sabrina Mulrain; Germany	22.85
400 metres	Otilia Ruicu; Romania	51.93	Jitka Burianová; Czech Republic	52.01	Grażyna Prokopek; Poland	52.28
800 metres	Claudia Gesell; Germany	2:03.05	Irina Krakoviak; Lithuania	2:04.08	Laetitia Valdonado; France	2:04.20
1500 metres	Lidia Chojecka; Poland	4:07.86	Yelena Zadorozhnaya; Russia	4:09.03	Anca Safta; Romania	4:09.78
5000 metres	Katalin Szentgyörgy; Hungary	15:18.80	Cristina Iloc; Romania	15:22.64	Olivera Jevtić; Yugoslavia	15:24.83
10,000 metres	Olivera Jevtić; Yugoslavia	32:37.59	Rosaria Console; Italy	33:05.77	Patricia Arribas; Spain	33:23.01
100 metres hurdles	Agnieszka Karaczun; Poland	13.32	Julie Pratt; Great Britain	13.40	Éva Miklós; Hungary	13.40
400 metres hurdles	Tasha Danvers; Great Britain	56.00	Ulrike Urbansky; Germany	56.08	Anika Ahrens; Germany	57.34
20 kilometres walk	Claudia Iovan; Romania	1:33:17	Lyudmila Dedekina; Russia	1:34:02	Melanie Seeger; Germany	1:34:17
4 × 100 metres relay	France; Nadine Mahobah; Muriel Hurtis; Fabe Dia; Doris Deruel	43.39	Germany; Alice Reuss; Marion Wagner; Esther Möller; Sabrina Mulrain	43.53	Poland; Monika Długa; Irena Sznajder; Agnieszka Rysiukiewicz; Magdalena Haszczyc	44.47
4 × 400 metres relay	Russia; Tatyana Levina; Irina Yemelyanova; Marina Grishakova; Svetlana Pospelova	3:29.04	Germany; Nicole Marahrens; Anika Ahrens; Ulrike Urbansky; Claudia Marx	3:29.37	Romania; Ramona Popovici; Anca Safta; Andrea Burlacu; Otilia Ruicu	3:31.71
High jump	Svetlana Lapina; Russia	1.98	Amewu Mensah; Germany	1.93	Linda Horvath; Austria	1.93
Pole vault	Vala Flosadóttir; Iceland	4.30	Nastja Ryjikh; Germany	4.35	Dana Cervantes; Spain	4.15
Long jump	Aurélie Félix; France	6.85	Inga Leiwesmeier; Germany	6.64	Éva Miklós; Hungary	6.51
Triple jump	Cristina Nicolau; Romania	14.70	Oksana Rogova; Russia	14.65	Adelina Gavrilă; Romania	14.37
Shot put	Yelena Ivanenko; Belarus	17.27	Nadine Beckel; Germany	17.15	Assunta Legnante; Italy	16.53
Discus throw	Lacramioara Ionescu; Romania	58.24	Nadine Beckel; Germany	57.75	Věra Pospíšilová; Czech Republic	56.65
Hammer throw	Florence Ezeh; France	64.56	Kirsten Münchow; Germany	63.68	Manuela Priemer; Germany	62.36
Javelin throw	Susan Mathies; Germany	57.64	Tetyana Lyakhovych; Ukraine	57.35	Veera Oksanen; Finland	55.90
Heptathlon	Natalya Roshchupkina; Russia	6125	Yelena Prokhorova; Russia	6011	Sonja Kesselschläger; Germany	5832

== Medal table ==
Rank	Nation	Gold	Silver	Bronze	Total
1	Germany	5	11	9	25
2	Romania	5	1	4	10
3	France	4	4	3	11
4	Poland	4	2	4	10
5	Russia	3	7	2	12
6	Great Britain	3	2	3	8
7	Italy	3	1	3	7
8	Spain	3	0	5	8
9	Hungary	2	2	2	6
10	Belarus	2	0	0	2
11	Ukraine	1	3	0	4
12	Finland	1	2	2	5
13	Norway	1	1	0	2
14	Austria	1	0	1	2
14	Greece	1	0	1	2
14	Yugoslavia	1	0	1	2
17	Iceland	1	0	0	1
17	Portugal	1	0	0	1
17	Slovakia	1	0	0	1
20	Czech Republic	0	1	1	2
21	Croatia	0	1	0	1
21	Denmark	0	1	0	1
21	Ireland	0	1	0	1
21	Latvia	0	1	0	1
21	Lithuania	0	1	0	1
21	Netherlands	0	1	0	1
27	Belgium	0	0	1	1
27	Bulgaria	0	0	1	1
Totals (28 entries)		43	43	43	129

== Participation ==
According to an unofficial count, 726 athletes from 42 countries participated in the event.

- Albania (2)
- Andorra (2)
- Austria (4)
- Belarus (18)
- Belgium (10)
- Bulgaria (7)
- Croatia (4)
- Cyprus (8)
- Czech Republic (28)
- Denmark (4)
- Estonia (3)
- Finland (32)
- France (67)
- Georgia (1)
- Germany (73)
- Gibraltar (1)
- Great Britain (64)
- Greece (20)
- Hungary (27)
- Iceland (3)
- Ireland (11)
- Israel (2)
- Italy (31)
- Latvia (7)
- Lithuania (9)
- Luxembourg (1)
- Macedonia (1)
- Moldova (2)
- Netherlands (13)
- Norway (9)
- Poland (41)
- Portugal (15)
- Romania (23)
- Russia (32)
- Slovakia (10)
- Slovenia (11)
- Spain (61)
- Sweden (28)
- Switzerland (7)
- Turkey (5)
- Ukraine (17)
- Yugoslavia (12)
