= Yousef El Nasri =

Spanish long-distance runner (born 1979)

Personal information
- Full name: Yousef El Nasri Serhani
- Born: 28 July 1979 (age 46) Larache, Morocco

Yousef El Nasri Serhani (born 28 July 1979) is a long-distance runner. Born in Morocco, he represents Spain internationally.

He finished fifth in the 3000 metres at the 1999 IAAF World Indoor Championships and eleventh in the short race at the 2003 World Cross Country Championships.

== Personal bests ==
- 1500 metres - 3:38.07 min (1999)
- 3000 metres - 7:39.80 min (1999)
- 5000 metres - 13:17.39 min (2000)
