= Jérôme Éyana =

French sprinter

Personal information
- Nationality: France
- Born: 5 July 1977 (age 49) Paris, France
- Height: 1.86 m (6 ft 1 in)
- Weight: 78 kg (172 lb)

Sport
- Sport: Running
- Events: 60 metres, 100 metres
- Club: Raçing Club de France

Achievements and titles
- Personal best: 100 m: 10.25 s (Beijing 2001) 60 m: 6.64 s (Birmingham 2003)
Medal record
Men’s athletics
Representing France
European U23 Championships
Silver medal – second place	1999 Göteborg	4 × 100 m relay
Jeux de la Francophonie
Silver medal – second place	2005 Niamey	4 × 100 m relay

Jérôme Éyana (born 5 July 1977) is a French sprinter who specializes in the 100 metres and 60 metres. He competed in the men's 4 × 100 metres relay at the 2000 Summer Olympics.

At the 2002 European Championships he finished fourth in 4 × 100 m relay with teammates David Patros, Issa-Aimé Nthépé and Ronald Pognon. He finished sixth in the 60 metres at the 2003 IAAF World Indoor Championships in Birmingham, equalling his personal best time of 6.64 seconds.

His personal best time over 100 m is 10.25 seconds, achieved at the 2001 Summer Universiade in Beijing.

== Running career ==
Jérôme arrived at Antony Athletisme 92 Club in 1996 and first trained with Serge Iotti, after soccer, boxing and (street) basketball, Jérôme discovered athletics at 18, using an enrollment form that his brother hasn't used at a local club "just to see". Originally from Cameroon, he has a competitive spirit, likes soul music and devoted his season to athletics "to make like a great champion." The same year he ran his first 60 m at l'INSEP in 6"87 and the 100 m in 10"67 with that mark he was qualified for the IAAF World Junior Championships in Athletics in Sydney but injury preventing him from competing.

2005

- Co-Silver Medalist in 4 × 100 m at The 4th Jeux de la Francophonie in Niamey
- Finalist in 100 m at The 4th Jeux de la Francophonie

2003

- Finalist [6th place] in 60 m at The 9th IAAF World Indoor Championships in Birmingham, UK
- Semi Finalist at The 9th IAAF World Championship in Paris with 4 × 100 m relay

2002

- Finalist with 4 × 100 m relay at the 18th European Athletics Championship in Munich, Germany

2001

- Finalist [6th place] in 100 m at the Universiades in Pekin, China.
- Semi Finalist in 100 m at The 4th Jeux de la Francophonie in Ottawa, Canada.
- Semi Finalist in 60 m at Indoor The 8th IAAF World Championship in Lisbon, Portugal
- Team member in 4 × 100 m relay in 7th IAAF World Championship in Edmonton, Canada

2000

- Team member in 4 × 100 m relay in The Olympic Games in Sydney, Australia

1999

- Team member in 4 × 100 m relay in World Championship in Sevilla, Spain
- Finalist [5th place] in 100 m at European Athletics U23 Championship in Göteborg, Sweden
- Silver Medalist with 4 × 100 m at European Athletics U23 Championship in Gôteborg, Sweden
- Team member in 4 × 100 m relay in I 7th AAF World Championship in Seville, Spain

1997

- Semi Finalist in 100 m at European Athletics U23 Championship in Turku, Finland
- Finalist with 4 × 100 m at European Athletics U23 Championship in Turku, Finland
