= 2005 Jeux de la Francophonie =

International sports competition in Niamey, Niger

Vèmes Jeux de la Francophonie
- Host city: Niamey, Niger
- Nations: 44
- Athletes: 2,500
- Opening: December 7, 2005
- Closing: December 17, 2005
- Opened by: Mamadou Tandja
- Main venue: Stade Général Seyni Kountché

The 2005 Jeux de la Francophonie (Hausa: Wasannin Francophonie na 2005), also known as V^{es} Jeux de la Francophonie, (French for Francophone Games) were held from December 7–17, 2005 in Niamey, Niger.

== Events ==
=== Sports ===
Sport	Gender	Results
Athletics (Track and field)	men + women	details
Basketball	women	details
Boxing	men	details
Football (soccer)	men	details
Judo	men + women	details
Table tennis	men + women	details
Wrestling	men	demonstration of traditional West African style (details)

=== Cultural ===
Fairy tale
Painting
Photography
Poetry
Sculpture
Song
Traditional inspiration dance

== Medal count ==
=== Total ===
* Host nation (Niger)

Rank	Nation	Gold	Silver	Bronze	Total
1	France	33	21	13	67
2	Morocco	12	15	15	42
3	Egypt	7	0	8	15
4	Romania	5	8	6	19
5	Canada	4	6	8	18
6	Ivory Coast	3	5	3	11
7	Tunisia	3	3	8	14
8	Benin	3	0	0	3
9	Burkina Faso	2	3	7	12
10	Lebanon	2	1	2	5
11	Chad	2	0	0	2
12	Senegal	1	4	6	11
13	Niger*	1	2	2	5
14	Seychelles	1	1	0	2
15	(Wallonia) French Community of Belgium	1	0	4	5
16	Rwanda	1	0	2	3
17	Madagascar	1	0	1	2
18	Lithuania	1	0	0	1
19	Quebec	0	3	3	6
20	Mauritius	0	2	1	3
21	Cameroon	0	1	3	4
21	Luxembourg	0	1	3	4
23	Gabon	0	1	2	3
24	Cape Verde	0	1	1	2
24	Mali	0	1	1	2
24	New Brunswick	0	1	1	2
27	Guinea-Bissau	0	1	0	1
28	Congo	0	0	1	1
28	DR Congo	0	0	1	1
28	Macedonia	0	0	1	1
28	Saint Lucia	0	0	1	1
28	Switzerland	0	0	1	1
Totals (32 entries)		83	81	105	269

== Participation ==
There were a total of 1287 participants from 44 states and governments at the 2005 Games.

Key
Nation (number of participants)

(Wallonia) French Community of Belgium (23) Benin (18) Bulgaria (4) Burkina Faso (50) Burundi (4) Cambodia (3) Cameroon (85) Canada (82) New Brunswick (8) Quebec (40) Cape Verde (3) Central African Republic (22) Chad (24) Comoros (7) Democratic Republic of the Congo (44)	Dominica Egypt (15) Equatorial Guinea (5) France (131) Gabon (18) Guinea (37) Guinea-Bissau (7) Haiti (38) Ivory Coast (43) Lebanon (17) Lithuania (7) Luxembourg (7) Macedonia (?) Madagascar (29) Mali (44)	Mauritius (18) Monaco (2) Morocco (108) Niger (98) Republic of the Congo (35) Romania (50) Rwanda (5) Saint Lucia (3) Senegal (69) Seychelles (15) Switzerland (16) Togo (17) Tunisia (27) Vietnam (4)
