= Frédéric Krantz =

French sprinter

Personal information
- Born: 13 September 1978 (age 48) Bordeaux, France

Sport
- Sport: Track and field
Medal record
Representing France
Mediterranean Games
Silver medal – second place	2005 Almeria	4x100 m relay
European Championships
Silver medal – second place	1998 Budapest	4×100 m relay

Frédéric Krantz (born 13 September 1978) is a French sprinter who specialized in the 200 metres.

At the 1998 European Championships he won a silver medal in 4 x 100 metres relay with teammates Thierry Lubin, Christophe Cheval and Needy Guims. As the European champions Great Britain fielded their own World Cup team, the French relay team was selected to represent Europe at the 1998 IAAF World Cup, finishing sixth while Great Britain won the event.

Krantz later finished fifth in relay at the 2000 Summer Olympics, this time with teammates Cheval, Guims and David Patros. He also competed in the 2004 Olympic relay and reached the 200 m quarterfinals of the 2001 World Championships.

His personal best time was 20.49 seconds, achieved in July 2001 in Saint-Étienne.
