= David Patros =

French sprinter

Personal information
- Born: 11 September 1977 (age 49) Paris, France
- Height: 180 cm (5 ft 11 in)
- Weight: 75 kg (165 lb)

Sport
- Country: France
- Sport: Athletics (track and field)
Medal record
Men's athletics
Representing France
European U23 Championships
Silver medal – second place	1999 Göteborg	4 × 100 m relay

David Patros (born 11 September 1977) is a retired French sprinter.

Born in Paris, he finished fifth in relay at the 2000 Summer Olympics, with teammates Frédéric Krantz, Christophe Cheval and Needy Guims. At the 2002 European Championships he finished fourth with teammates Issa-Aimé Nthépé, Jérôme Eyana and Ronald Pognon.

His personal best times were 10.13 seconds in the 100 m and 20.51 seconds in the 200 m, both achieved in July 2000.
