= Netherlands at the 2009 World Championships in Athletics =

- WA code: NED
- National federation: Koninklijke Nederlandse Atletiek Unie
- Website: www.atletiekunie.nl

in Berlin
- Competitors: 15
- Medals: Gold 0 Silver 0 Bronze 0 Total 0

World Championships in Athletics appearances
- 1976; 1980; 1983; 1987; 1991; 1993; 1995; 1997; 1999; 2001; 2003; 2005; 2007; 2009; 2011; 2013; 2015; 2017; 2019; 2022; 2023; 2025

The Netherlands competed at the 2009 World Championships in Athletics from 15–23 August. A team of 15 athletes was announced in preparation for the competition. Selected athletes have achieved one of the competition's qualifying standards. The team included 2006 European champion Bram Som and two-time European Indoor medallist Gregory Sedoc.

== Team selection ==
Track and road events

Event	Athletes	
Event	Men	Women
200 metres	Patrick van Luijk	
800 metres	Bram Som	
1500 metres		Adrienne Herzog; Susan Kuijken
110 metres hurdles	Gregory Sedoc	—
4×100 metres relay	Gregory Sedoc; Caimin Douglas; Guus Hoogmoed; Patrick van Luijk; Virgil Spier; Maarten Heisen	

Field and combined events

Event	Athletes	
Event	Men	Women
High jump	Martijn Nuijens	
Discus throw	Erik Cadée	
Heptathlon	—	Yvonne Wisse
Decathlon	Eugène Martineau; Eelco Sintnicolaas; Ingmar Vos	—

== Results ==
=== Men ===
Track and road events

Event	Athletes	Heat Round 1		Heat Round 2		Semifinal		Final	
Event	Athletes	Result	Rank	Result	Rank	Result	Rank	Result	Rank
200 m	Patrick van Luijk	21.05	36	did not advance					
800 m	Bram Som	1:46.33	5 Q			DNF^{x}		1:45.86	7
110 m hurdles	Gregory Sedoc	13.54	8 Q			13.45	12	did not advance	
4 × 100 m relay	Gregory Sedoc; Caimin Douglas; Guus Hoogmoed; Patrick van Luijk; Virgil Spier; Maarten Heisen	38.95 SB	10					did not advance	

^{x}= In the first semifinals heat, Bram Som tripped over Abubaker Kaki, who had fallen on his own account. After a protest, Som was allowed to compete in the finals.

Field events

Event	Athletes	Qualification		Final	
Event	Athletes	Result	Rank	Result	Rank
High jump	Martijn Nuijens	2.27	9 q	2.23	5
Discus throw	Erik Cadée	60.64	19	did not advance	
Decathlon	Eugène Martineau			8,055	19
Decathlon	Eelco Sintnicolaas			DNF	
Decathlon	Ingmar Vos			8,009 PB	20

=== Women ===
Track and road events

Event	Athletes	Qualification		Final	
Event	Athletes	Result	Rank	Result	Rank
1,500 m	Adrienne Herzog	4:10.10	27	did not advance	
1,500 m	Susan Kuijken	4:18.10	36	did not advance	

Field and combined events

Event	Athletes	Qualification		Final	
Event	Athletes	Result	Rank	Result	Rank
Heptathlon	Yvonne Wisse			5,704	20

== See also ==
Netherlands at other World Championships in 2013

- Netherlands at the 2009 UCI Road World Championships
