= 2002 European Athletics Indoor Championships – Men's 60 metres =

The men's 60 metres event at the 2002 European Athletics Indoor Championships was held on March 2–3.

== Medalists ==
Gold	Silver	Bronze
Jason Gardener; Great Britain	Mark Lewis-Francis; Great Britain	Anatoliy Dovhal; Ukraine

== Results ==
=== Heats ===
First 3 of each heat (Q) and the next 1 fastest (q) qualified for the semifinals.

Rank	Heat	Name	Nationality	Time	Notes
1	5	Mark Lewis-Francis	Great Britain	6.57	Q
2	3	Anatoliy Dovhal	Ukraine	6.59	Q
3	1	Jason Gardener	Great Britain	6.61	Q
4	4	Patrik Lövgren	Sweden	6.67	Q
5	2	Daniel Dubois	Switzerland	6.69	Q
5	4	Aime Nthepe	France	6.69	Q
5	5	Francesco Scuderi	Italy	6.69	Q
8	1	John Ertzgaard	Norway	6.70	Q, PB
8	3	Dejan Vojnović	Croatia	6.70	Q, PB
10	4	Andrea Rabino	Italy	6.71	Q, SB
10	5	Rok Predanič	Slovenia	6.71	Q, NR
12	1	Nathan Bongelo	Belgium	6.72	Q
12	2	Marc Blume	Germany	6.72	Q
12	2	Markus Pöyhönen	Finland	6.72	Q
12	3	Akinola Lashore	Great Britain	6.72	Q
16	3	Virgil Spier	Netherlands	6.73	q
17	1	Matic Šušteršic	Slovenia	6.74	NR
17	2	Urban Acman	Slovenia	6.74	=NR
17	3	Ilya Levin	Russia	6.74	
20	5	Anthony Ferro	Belgium	6.75	SB
21	1	Angelos Pavlakakis	Greece	6.76	
21	3	Philipp Cermak	Austria	6.76	
21	4	Cecilio Maestra	Spain	6.76	
24	5	Laszlo Babaly	Hungary	6.77	
25	5	Martijn Ungerer	Netherlands	6.77	
26	4	Troy Douglas	Netherlands	6.82	
27	1	Mark Howard	Ireland	6.83	
28	2	Martin Brinarsky	Slovakia	6.86	
28	5	Aham Okeke	Norway	6.86	
30	2	Sergejs Inšakovs	Latvia	6.88	
31	3	Rachid Chouhal	Malta	6.89	SB
32	1	Martin Lachkovics	Austria	6.91	
32	2	Darren Gilford	Malta	6.91	
34	4	Erol Mutlusov	Turkey	7.01	
35	2	Attila Farkas	Israel	7.03	
	3	Samsa Tuikka	Finland	DNS	
	4	Christo Christov	Macedonia	DNS	
	4	Aristoteles Gavelas	Greece	DNS	

=== Semifinals ===
First 4 of each semifinals qualified directly (Q) for the final.

Rank	Heat	Name	Nationality	Time	Notes
1	2	Jason Gardener	Great Britain	6.55	Q
2	1	Mark Lewis-Francis	Great Britain	6.60	Q
2	2	Anatoliy Dovhal	Ukraine	6.60	Q
4	2	Nathan Bongelo	Belgium	6.63	Q
5	2	Francesco Scuderi	Italy	6.65	Q
6	2	Rok Predanič	Slovenia	6.66	NR
7	2	Aime Nthepe	France	6.67	
8	1	Patrik Lövgren	Sweden	6.68	Q
8	2	Markus Pöyhönen	Finland	6.68	
10	2	Marc Blume	Germany	6.70	
11	1	Andrea Rabino	Italy	6.71	Q
12	1	John Ertzgaard	Norway	6.71	Q
13	1	Daniel Dubois	Switzerland	6.75	
14	1	Akinola Lashore	Great Britain	6.76	
15	1	Dejan Vojnović	Croatia	6.78	
	1	Virgil Spier	Netherlands	DNS	

=== Final ===
Rank	Lane	Name	Nationality	Time	Notes
1st place, gold medalist(s)	4	Jason Gardener	Great Britain	6.49	=CR
2nd place, silver medalist(s)	6	Mark Lewis-Francis	Great Britain	6.55	
3rd place, bronze medalist(s)	5	Anatoliy Dovhal	Ukraine	6.62	
4	2	Nathan Bongelo	Belgium	6.67	
5	8	Francesco Scuderi	Italy	6.69	
6	3	Patrik Lövgren	Sweden	6.70	
7	7	John Ertzgaard	Norway	6.74	
8	1	Andrea Rabino	Italy	6.74	
