= Phanos =

Dutch athletics club

Phanos is a Dutch athletics club. Its home stadium is the Olympic stadium in Amsterdam.

== History ==
The club was founded in 1999–2000. The club was formed in a merger of two clubs, AV Sagitta (founded 1936) and AV Blauw Wit (founded 1917).

The name Phanos, meaning "torch" in Greek, refers to the "Marathon-tower" situated just outside the Olympic stadium, where in 1928 the Olympic fire burned.

== Known athletes ==
Since the founding of Phanos, the club has known many successful members. Some of today's successful members are as follows:

Men: Gert van Bergen, Bjorn Blauwhof, Jeroen Blommerde, Shaun Bownes, Maarten Bouwman, Harm Bruins, Patrick Cronie, Casper Dirks, Jerrel Feller, Akwasi Frimpong, Niels Geursen, Martijn Hoogendam, Guus Hoogmoed, Martijn Klaassen, Mike van Kruchten, Erik Leeflang, Jonathan Pengel, Maarten Persoon, Lindell Philip, Youssef el Rhalfioui, Tjendo Samuel, Koen Smet, Yoeri Stieglis, Robert Ton, Tom Uitslag, Marcel van der Westen, Dennis Tilburg, Rik Wester, Ben Vet, Peter Wolters, Daniël Lam, Yannick Mahieu, Jules de Bont, Yoshua Gül, and Jan Westerdiep.

Women: Fabienne Aardenburg, Bianca Baak, Janice Babel, Bonne de Boer, Madiea Ghafoor, Joyce Huisman, Romy Kraaijeveld, Nicole Kroonenburg, Loreanne Kuhurima, Nicky Lam, Nicky van Leuveren, Kristijna Loonen, Nina Mathijssen, Lara Nicod, Jo-Ann Plet, Biance Reuver, Miriam van Reijen, Chanté Samuel, Jamile Samuel, Lisanne Schol, Paula Schouten, Kadene Vassel, Urta Rozenstruik and Wendy Visser.

Successful athletes from the past are:

Men: Timothy Beck, Aziz Bougra, Maarten van Baardwijk, Marc de Vries, Thijs Feuth, Michel Kerkdijk, Daniël van Leeuwen, Erik Negerman, Martijn Nuijens, Bob Winter, Harvey Bijnaar, Bas de Vos, Abdi Nageeye and Dennis Licht.

Women: Fanny Blankers-Koen, Angelique Hoogeveen-Smit, Janneke Hulshof, Ciska Janssen, Marjolein de Jong and Jolanda Keizer.

The most famous member of Phanos was Fanny Blankers-Koen, even though she was member of AV Sagitta and objected to the merger between Sagitta and Blauw Wit. Other honored athletes from Phanos are Hans Fokkens, Simon ter Laare, Tjerk Vellinga and Wim Visser.

== Phanos medals at European championships and World championships ==
Year	Tournament	Discipline	Rank	Men	Performance	Rank	Women	Performance
2000	IAAF World Junior Championships in Athletics	400 m hurdles				2nd place, silver medalist(s)	Marjolein de Jong	56.50 s
2003	IAAF World Junior Championships in Athletics	4 × 100 m relay	3rd place, bronze medalist(s)	Guus Hoogmoed	38.87 s			
2007	EC Neo-Seniors	Heptathlon				2nd place, silver medalist(s)	Jolanda Keizer	6219 pt
2007	European Athletics Indoor Championships	60 m hurdles	2nd place, silver medalist(s)	Marcel van der Westen	7.62 s			
2009	European Athletics Junior Championships	4 × 100 m relay				3rd place, bronze medalist(s)	Jamile Samuel	45.88 s
2009	European Athletics Indoor Championships	Pentathlon				2nd place, silver medalist(s)	Jolanda Keizer	4664 pts
2010	IAAF World Junior Championships in Athletics	100 m				3rd place, bronze medalist(s)	Jamile Samuel	11.56 s
		200 m				3rd place, bronze medalist(s)	Jamile Samuel	23.27 s
		4 × 100 m relay				3rd place, bronze medalist(s)	Jamile Samuel	44.09 s
2011	European Athletics Junior Championships	100 m				2nd place, silver medalist(s)	Jamile Samuel	11.43 s
		200 m				2nd place, silver medalist(s)	Jamile Samuel	23.31 s
		400 m				3rd place, bronze medalist(s)	Madiea Ghafoor	53.73 s

=== National Championship in Athletics ===
Medals since 2000

Year	Discipline	Rank	Men	Performance	Rank	Women	Performance
2000	400 m hurdles				1st place, gold medalist(s)	Marjolein de Jong	59.72 s
2001	400 m hurdles				1st place, gold medalist(s)	Marjolein de Jong	56.87 s
	long jump	2nd place, silver medalist(s)	Marc de Vries	7.37 m			
	triple jump				3rd place, bronze medalist(s)	Janneke Hulshof	11.63 m
2002	400 m				1st place, gold medalist(s)	Marjolein de Jong	54.27 s
	400 m hurdles				1st place, gold medalist(s)	Marjolein de Jong	58.67 s
	triple jump	2nd place, silver medalist(s)	José Augusto da Silveiro Neto	14.86 m			
	shot put	3rd place, bronze medalist(s)	Ben Vet	17.10 m			
	discus	3rd place, bronze medalist(s)	Ben Vet	53.72 m			
2003	200 m	2nd place, silver medalist(s)	Guus Hoogmoed	21.02 s			
	400 m				3rd place, bronze medalist(s)	Marjolein de Jong	55.79 s
	1500 m	3rd place, bronze medalist(s)	Bob Winter	3:49.61			
	400 m hurdles				2nd place, silver medalist(s)	Marjolein de Jong	59.82 s
	discus	3rd place, bronze medalist(s)	Ben Vet	55.08 m			
2004	200 m	1st place, gold medalist(s)	Guus Hoogmoed	20.88 s			
	400 m				1st place, gold medalist(s)	Marjolein de Jong	53.60 s
	1500 m	2nd place, silver medalist(s)	Bob Winter	3:51.16			
	400 m hurdles				1st place, gold medalist(s)	Marjolein de Jong	59.95 s
2005	100 m	1st place, gold medalist(s)	Guus Hoogmoed	10.38 s			
	200 m	1st place, gold medalist(s)	Guus Hoogmoed	20.41 s			
	1500 m	1st place, gold medalist(s)	Casper Dirks	3:55.71			
	5000 m				3rd place, bronze medalist(s)	Kristijna Loonen	16:33.18
	400 m hurdles				1st place, gold medalist(s)	Marjolein de Jong	56.07 s
	triple jump	2nd place, silver medalist(s)	Maarten Bouwman	14.41 m	3rd place, bronze medalist(s)	Janneke Hulshof	12.14 m
2006	100 m	2nd place, silver medalist(s)	Guus Hoogmoed	10.60 s			
	200 m	1st place, gold medalist(s)	Guus Hoogmoed	21.05 s			
	400 m	2nd place, silver medalist(s)	Youssef el Rhalfioui	47.92 s			
	1500 m	1st place, gold medalist(s)	Bob Winter	3:48.51			
	400 m hurdles				1st place, gold medalist(s)	Marjolein de Jong	56.72 s
	triple jump	1st place, gold medalist(s)	Maarten Bouwman	14.57 m	1st place, gold medalist(s)	Janneke Hulshof	12.32 m
2007	100 m	1st place, gold medalist(s)	Guus Hoogmoed	10.26 s			
	200 m	1st place, gold medalist(s)	Guus Hoogmoed	20.48 s	2nd place, silver medalist(s)	Jamile Samuel	24.44 s
	400 m	1st place, gold medalist(s)	Youssef el Rhalfioui	46.67 s			
	1500 m				2nd place, silver medalist(s)	Nina Mathijssen	4:43.85
	triple jump				2nd place, silver medalist(s)	Janneke Hulshof	12.33 m
	high jump	1st place, gold medalist(s)	Martijn Nuijens	2.21 m			
	Pole vault	3rd place, bronze medalist(s)	Niels Geursen	4.82 m			
	discus	3rd place, bronze medalist(s)	Maarten Persoon	53.55 m			
	javelin	2nd place, silver medalist(s)	Jeroen Blommerde	69.39 m			
	hammer throw	3rd place, bronze medalist(s)	Maarten Persoon	55.20 m			
2008	100 m	2nd place, silver medalist(s)	Guus Hoogmoed	10.58 s			
	200 m	2nd place, silver medalist(s)	Guus Hoogmoed	20.92 s			
	400 m	1st place, gold medalist(s)	Youssef el Rhalfioui	46.74 s			
		3rd place, bronze medalist(s)	Peter Wolters	48.07 s			
	110 m hurdles	1st place, gold medalist(s)	Marcel van der Westen	13.52 s			
	400 m hurdles				1st place, gold medalist(s)	Marjolein de Jong	55.86 s
	long jump				2nd place, silver medalist(s)	Jolanda Keizer	6.03 m
	hammer throw	3rd place, bronze medalist(s)	Maarten Persoon	57.08 m			
2009	100 m	2nd place, silver medalist(s)	Guus Hoogmoed	10.54 s	1st place, gold medalist(s)	Jamile Samuel	11.73 s
					2nd place, silver medalist(s)	Kadene Vassell	11.89 s
					3rd place, bronze medalist(s)	Jo-Ann Plet	12.05 s
	200 m	2nd place, silver medalist(s)	Guus Hoogmoed	21.24 s	1st place, gold medalist(s)	Kadene Vassell	24.11 s
	800 m	1st place, gold medalist(s)	Youssef el Rhalfioui	1:55.35			
	110 m hurdles	2nd place, silver medalist(s)	Mike van Kruchten	14.01 s			
	long jump	1st place, gold medalist(s)	Jonathan Pengel	7.62 m			
	triple jump				3rd place, bronze medalist(s)	Wendy Visser	12.16 m
	shot put	3rd place, bronze medalist(s)	Maarten Persoon	17.57 m			
	discus	2nd place, silver medalist(s)	Maarten Persoon	57.32 m			
		3rd place, bronze medalist(s)	Patrick Cronie	50.53 m			
	javelin	2nd place, silver medalist(s)	Jeroen Blommerde	70.78 m			
2010	100 m				2nd place, silver medalist(s)	Kadene Vassell	11.93 s
	200 m	2nd place, silver medalist(s)	Guus Hoogmoed	21.40 s	1st place, gold medalist(s)	Kadene Vassell	24.37 s
	400 m	2nd place, silver medalist(s)	Youssef el Rhalfioui	47.03 s	2nd place, silver medalist(s)	Nicky van Leuveren	53.95 s
	110 m hurdles	1st place, gold medalist(s)	Marcel van der Westen	13.60 s			
		3rd place, bronze medalist(s)	Erik Leeflang	13.96 s			
	3000 m steeple	1st place, gold medalist(s)	Dennis Licht	8:51.79	3rd place, bronze medalist(s)	Lara Nicod	10:33.23
	long jump	2nd place, silver medalist(s)	Jonathan Pengel	7.45 m			
	triple jump				2nd place, silver medalist(s)	Wendy Visser	12.12 m
	high jump				3rd place, bronze medalist(s)	Joyce Huisman	1.75 m
	shot put	1st place, gold medalist(s)	Maarten Persoon	18.24 m			
		3rd place, bronze medalist(s)	Patrick Cronie	17.69 m			
	discus	2nd place, silver medalist(s)	Maarten Persoon	58.42 m			
	javelin	3rd place, bronze medalist(s)	Jeroen Blommerde	67.92 m			
2011	100 m				2nd place, silver medalist(s)	Jamile Samuel	11.75 s
	200 m				1st place, gold medalist(s)	Jamile Samuel	23.43 s
	400 m	2nd place, silver medalist(s)	Bjorn Blauwhof	47.17 s	2nd place, silver medalist(s)	Madiea Ghafoor	54.52 s
	110 m hurdles	1st place, gold medalist(s)	Marcel van der Westen	13.77 s			
		2nd place, silver medalist(s)	Tjendo Samuel	14.17 s			
	400 m hurdles				2nd place, silver medalist(s)	Bianca Baak	1:00.72
	3000 m steeple				2nd place, silver medalist(s)	Lara Nicod	10:35.96
	triple jump	3rd place, bronze medalist(s)	Maarten Bouwman	14.47 m			
	shot put	2nd place, silver medalist(s)	Patrick Cronie	18.06 m			
	discus	3rd place, bronze medalist(s)	Maarten Persoon	56.12 m	3rd place, bronze medalist(s)	Fabiënne Aardenburg	49.12 m
	javelin				2nd place, silver medalist(s)	Lisanne Schol	52.34 m
	hammer throw	2nd place, silver medalist(s)	Maarten Persoon	58.79 m			
