= Coby Miller =

American track and field athlete

Personal information
- Born: October 19, 1976 (age 49) Ackerman, Mississippi, U.S.
- Height: 5 ft 9 in (1.75 m)

Sport
- Sport: Running
- Events: 100 meters, 200 meters
Medal record
Men's athletics
Representing United States
Olympic Games
Silver medal – second place	2004 Athens	4 × 100 m relay
Universiade
Gold medal – first place	1999 Palma de Mallorca	200 m
Gold medal – first place	1999 Palma de Mallorca	4 × 100 m relay
IAAF World Cup
Gold medal – first place	2002 Madrid	4 × 100 m relay

Coby Miller (born October 19, 1976) is an American track and field athlete, who specialises in the sprint events. In his career, he recorded a sub-10 second personal best in the 100 meters and a sub-20 second best in the 200 meters. In the latter distance, he won the 1999 Summer Universiade and reached the 2000 Sydney Olympics final. He suffered leg injuries in the 2001 and 2002 seasons, but returned in late 2002 as part of the gold-medal-winning American 4 x 100 m relay team at the IAAF World Cup, breaking the championship record. He ran under ten seconds in the 100 m Olympics Trials in 2004, but failed to qualify for the event. However, he won an Olympic silver medal at the 2004 Athens Games as part of the American 4 x 100 m relay team. At his peak he was regularly ranked among the top ten American sprinters.

== Career ==
Miller had his first successes as a collegiate athlete at Auburn University; in 1999 he won the 200 m at the NCAA indoor championships and came second in the outdoor championships. He also enjoyed international success that year, winning the 200 m at the Summer Universiade.

He set a 200 m personal best of 19.96 seconds at the 2000 United States Olympic Trials, and reached the 200 m final at the Sydney Olympics. He qualified for the IAAF Grand Prix Final in the 100 m and finished in fourth place. The following year he became the 2001 American indoor champion over 200 m, running a world leading time. However, a pile-up at the finish line resulted in a broken fibula, ruling him out for the rest of the athletics season. This included the 2001 IAAF World Indoor Championships in which he was previously a strong medal contender. The following year he missed much of the indoor track season due to hamstring problems, which were a knock-on effect of his previous injury.

Upon his return in 2002 he won medals at a number of track meets in both the 100 and 200 m, including a personal best-equalling win of 9.98 seconds in the 100 m at Gresham. He again reached the Grand Prix Final but finished last. However, Tim Montgomery and Dwain Chambers who finished first and second later tested positive for banned substances and Miller was upgraded to sixth place. Forming an American team with Jon Drummond, Jason Smoots and Kaaron Conwright for the 2002 IAAF World Cup, Miller anchored the US to victory, setting a championship record of 37.95 seconds. He was ranked #7 in the world in both the 100 m and 200 m that year. The following year he failed to repeat this form, scraping Track and Field News' top ten US sprinters list. However, he set new personal bests over 50 and 60 meters, with runs of 5.67 seconds and 6.49 seconds respectively. He also won 200 m at the Athletissima Grand Prix, finishing in 20.07 seconds.

He competed at the 2004 World Indoor Championships but failed to make the 200 m final. In the outdoor season, Miller put in a strong performance in the 100 m Olympic Trials in 2004. However, his time of 9.99 seconds was not enough to edge out Maurice Greene, Justin Gatlin or Shawn Crawford. This was the first time that a sprinter had run under ten seconds at the event and not managed to qualify for the Olympics.^{[nb]} He was also eliminated in the 200 m event, registering a sub-par 20.68 seconds. His time in the 100 m trials was convincing enough for a place in the 4 x 100 m relay squad, and the team (comprising Miller, Crawford, Greene and Gatlin) went on to finish second in the Olympic finals; resulting in an Olympic silver medal for Miller.

Since the 2004 Olympics, Miller has not attended any major international competitions. However, he regularly competed at track meetings during the 2004–2008 period, running in the 100 and 200 meters, although his times were significantly slower in comparison to his 2004 peak. He competed at the Ponce Grand Prix in May 2009.

== Personal bests ==
Event	Time (seconds)	Venue	Date
50 meters	5.67	Liévin, France	February 23, 2003
55 meters	6.11	Gainesville, Florida, United States	January 22, 1999
60 meters	6.49	Ghent, Belgium	February 9, 2003
100 meters	9.98	Durham, North Carolina, United States	June 2, 2000
100 meters	9.98	Portland, Oregon, United States	May 18, 2002
200 meters	19.96	Sacramento, California, United States	June 23, 2000

- All information from IAAF Profile.

== Notes ==
- ^{nb} Miller remains the only sprinter to have run a legal sub-10 second time and not qualify. At the 2008 Olympic Trials six finalists ran under ten seconds but this was wind-assisted by a 4.1 m/s wind, which is twice the legal limit allowed for valid record runs.
