= 2003 IAAF World Indoor Championships – Men's 60 metres =

The men's 60 metres event at the 2003 IAAF World Indoor Championships was held on March 14.

== Medalists ==
Gold	Silver	Bronze
Justin Gatlin; United States	Kim Collins; Saint Kitts and Nevis	Jason Gardener; Great Britain

== Results ==
=== Heats ===
First 3 of each heat (Q) and next 3 fastest (q) qualified for the semifinals.

Rank	Heat	Name	Nationality	Time	Notes
1	1	Justin Gatlin	United States	6.53	Q
2	7	Markus Pöyhönen	Finland	6.58	Q, =NR
3	5	Kim Collins	Saint Kitts and Nevis	6.59	Q
4	5	Mark Lewis-Francis	Great Britain	6.60	Q
5	2	Gábor Dobos	Hungary	6.61	Q
5	4	Jason Gardener	Great Britain	6.61	Q
5	4	Eric Nkansah	Ghana	6.61	Q, SB
8	6	Vicente de Lima	Brazil	6.63	Q, AR
9	2	Deji Aliu	Nigeria	6.64	Q
9	7	Prodromos Katsantonis	Cyprus	6.64	Q, PB
11	3	Georgios Theodoridis	Greece	6.65	Q
12	6	Simone Collio	Italy	6.66	Q, PB
13	6	Roger Angouono-Moke	Republic of the Congo	6.67	Q
13	7	Dejan Vojnović	Croatia	6.67	Q
15	2	Morne Nagel	South Africa	6.68	Q, SB
16	2	Anatoliy Dovhal	Ukraine	6.68	q
17	4	Gennadiy Chernovol	Kazakhstan	6.69	Q
18	5	Andrea Rabino	Italy	6.70	Q
19	4	Jérôme Éyana	France	6.71	q
19	6	Nobuharu Asahara	Japan	6.71	SB
19	7	Nicolas Macrozonaris	Canada	6.71	q
22	3	Lindel Frater	Jamaica	6.72	Q
22	6	Aristotelis Gavelas	Greece	6.72	
24	1	Dwight Thomas	Jamaica	6.73	Q
24	4	Aleksandr Smirnov	Russia	6.73	
26	1	Dave Tomlin	Canada	6.74	Q
27	1	Rok Predanič	Slovenia	6.75	
28	3	Andrey Epishin	Russia	6.76	Q
28	3	Shen Yunbao	China	6.76	
28	7	Matic Šušteršic	Slovenia	6.76	
31	1	Argo Golberg	Estonia	6.77	
31	3	Terrence Trammell	United States	6.77	
31	4	Idrissa Sanou	Burkina Faso	6.77	NR
31	5	Daniel Dubois	Switzerland	6.77	
35	2	Stéphane Cali	France	6.79	
35	4	Peter Pulu	Papua New Guinea	6.79	=NR
35	6	Salem Mubarak Al-Yami	Saudi Arabia	6.79	NR
38	4	Suryo Agung Wibowo	Indonesia	6.82	
39	5	Erol Mutlusoy	Turkey	6.83	
39	6	Leonard Myles-Mills	Ghana	6.83	
41	5	Stéphane Buckland	Mauritius	6.84	
42	7	Darren Gilford	Malta	6.87	PB
43	3	Chiang Wai Hung	Hong Kong	6.90	
44	1	Amr Ibrahim Mostafa Seoud	Egypt	6.93	
45	6	Diego Ferreira	Paraguay	6.96	NR
46	7	Vahagn Javakhyan	Armenia	6.97	NR
47	2	Reanchai Seerhawong	Thailand	7.01	PB
48	5	Gian Nicola Berardi	San Marino	7.02	
49	3	Diego Valdés	Chile	7.13	
50	1	Andre Tambazah Amadie Isilam	Comoros	7.17	PB
51	2	Afzal Baig	Pakistan	7.24	
52	7	JJ Capelle	Nauru	7.30	
53	1	Brian Mohammed	Swaziland	7.40	
54	5	Antonio Ichiou	Northern Mariana Islands	7.44	
55	2	Ibrahim Umar	Maldives	7.71	
56	3	Fagamanu Sofai	Samoa	7.72	

=== Semifinals ===
First 2 of each semifinal (Q) and next 2 fastest (q) qualified for the final.

Rank	Heat	Name	Nationality	Time	Notes
1	3	Jason Gardener	Great Britain	6.54	Q
2	2	Mark Lewis-Francis	Great Britain	6.55	Q, SB
3	1	Justin Gatlin	United States	6.56	Q
4	2	Gábor Dobos	Hungary	6.58	Q, SB
5	2	Deji Aliu	Nigeria	6.59	q
5	3	Markus Pöyhönen	Finland	6.59	Q
7	2	Kim Collins	Saint Kitts and Nevis	6.60	q
8	3	Eric Nkansah	Ghana	6.63	
9	3	Morne Nagel	South Africa	6.65	SB
10	3	Prodromos Katsantonis	Cyprus	6.66	
11	1	Jérôme Éyana	France	6.67	Q, SB
11	3	Nicolas Macrozonaris	Canada	6.67	
13	1	Georgios Theodoridis	Greece	6.68	
13	2	Dejan Vojnović	Croatia	6.68	
15	1	Lindel Frater	Jamaica	6.69	
16	1	Gennadiy Chernovol	Kazakhstan	6.69	
17	1	Vicente de Lima	Brazil	6.70	
17	2	Roger Angouono-Moke	Republic of the Congo	6.70	
19	1	Simone Collio	Italy	6.71	
20	2	Anatoliy Dovhal	Ukraine	6.72	
21	3	Andrea Rabino	Italy	6.73	
22	2	Andrey Epishin	Russia	6.77	
23	1	Dave Tomlin	Canada	6.83	
24	3	Dwight Thomas	Jamaica	7.33	

=== Final ===
Rank	Lane	Name	Nationality	Time	React	Notes
1st place, gold medalist(s)	6	Justin Gatlin	United States	6.46	0.138	
2nd place, silver medalist(s)	2	Kim Collins	Saint Kitts and Nevis	6.53	0.109	NR
3rd place, bronze medalist(s)	5	Jason Gardener	Great Britain	6.55	0.132	
4	3	Mark Lewis-Francis	Great Britain	6.57	0.143	
5	4	Gábor Dobos	Hungary	6.64	0.127	
6	7	Jérôme Éyana	France	6.64	0.131	PB
7	1	Markus Pöyhönen	Finland	6.65	0.152	
8	8	Deji Aliu	Nigeria	6.72	0.144	
