= 2000 European Athletics Indoor Championships – Men's 60 metres =

Men's sprinting event held in February 2000

The men's 60 metres event at the 2000 European Athletics Indoor Championships was held on February 26–27.

== Medalists ==
Gold	Silver	Bronze
Jason Gardener; Great Britain	Georgios Theodoridis; Greece	Angelos Pavlakakis; Greece

== Results ==
=== Heats ===
First 2 of each heat (Q) and the next 4 fastest (q) qualified for the semifinals.

Rank	Heat	Name	Nationality	Time	Notes
1	3	Georgios Theodoridis	Greece	6.59	Q
2	4	Angelos Pavlakakis	Greece	6.62	Q
3	5	Jason Gardener	Great Britain	6.63	Q
4	1	Marcin Krzywański	Poland	6.64	Q
4	3	Alexander Kosenkow	Germany	6.64	Q
4	6	Roland Németh	Hungary	6.64	Q
7	1	Francesco Scuderi	Italy	6.66	Q, SB
7	4	Kostantin Rurak	Ukraine	6.66	Q, PB
7	6	Tim Göbel	Germany	6.66	Q
10	2	Stefano Tilli	Italy	6.70	Q
10	3	David Patros	France	6.70	q
10	4	Andrea Rabino	Italy	6.70	q
10	5	Attila Farkas	Hungary	6.70	Q
14	6	Patrick Lövgren	Sweden	6.71	q
15	6	Christoforos Choidis	Greece	6.72	q
16	5	Piotr Balcerzak	Poland	6.73	
17	1	Marc Blume	Germany	6.74	
17	2	Gábor Dobos	Hungary	6.74	Q
17	2	Aime Nthepe	France	6.74	
20	6	Alexandr Porchomovskiy	Israel	6.75	
21	1	Dmitri Vasilyev	Russia	6.76	
22	4	Valeriy Kirdyashev	Russia	6.77	
22	5	Anatoliy Dovgal	Ukraine	6.77	
24	5	Matic Šušteršic	Slovenia	6.78	
25	4	Venancio José	Spain	6.79	
26	2	Sergey Bychkov	Russia	6.80	
27	5	Kari Louramo	Finland	6.81	
28	1	Jamie Henthorn	Great Britain	6.84	
28	3	Aham Okeke	Norway	6.84	
30	3	Rachid Chouhal	Malta	6.85	NR
31	6	Patrick Stevens	Belgium	6.86	
32	4	Stephane Cali	France	6.87	
33	2	Stefanos Ioannou	Cyprus	6.88	PB
34	1	Kim Lesch	Finland	6.90	
34	2	Janne Haapasalo	Finland	6.90	
36	3	Daniel Dubois	Switzerland	6.91	
37	5	Andrew Reets	Belgium	6.96	
38	2	Vitaliy Seniv	Ukraine	7.01	
39	1	Fabrizio Righi	San Marino	7.18	
40	6	Teymur Gassimov	Azerbaijan	7.20	

=== Semifinals ===
First 4 of each semifinals qualified directly (Q) for the final.

Rank	Heat	Name	Nationality	Time	Notes
1	2	Georgios Theodoridis	Greece	6.53	Q
2	1	Jason Gardener	Great Britain	6.54	Q
3	1	Angelos Pavlakakis	Greece	6.57	Q, SB
4	2	Roland Németh	Hungary	6.62	Q
5	2	Tim Göbel	Germany	6.63	Q
6	1	Stefano Tilli	Italy	6.64	Q
7	2	Konstantin Rurak	Ukraine	6.65	Q, PB
8	2	Marcin Krzywański	Poland	6.66	
9	1	Patrick Lövgren	Sweden	6.67	Q, SB
9	2	Christoforos Choidis	Greece	6.67	
11	1	Francesco Scuderi	Italy	6.68	
12	1	Alexander Kosenkow	Germany	6.73	
12	2	Andrea Rabino	Italy	6.73	
14	1	David Patros	France	6.74	
14	1	Attila Farkas	Hungary	6.74	
14	2	Gábor Dobos	Hungary	6.74	

=== Final ===
Rank	Lane	Name	Nationality	Reaction	Time	Notes
1st place, gold medalist(s)	4	Jason Gardener	Great Britain	0.148	6.49	=CR
2nd place, silver medalist(s)	5	Georgios Theodoridis	Greece	0.136	6.51	
3rd place, bronze medalist(s)	3	Angelos Pavlakakis	Greece	0.134	6.54	SB
4	1	Stefano Tilli	Italy	0.157	6.59	PB
5	6	Roland Németh	Hungary	0.121	6.61	
6	8	Konstantin Rurak	Ukraine	0.138	6.62	PB
7	2	Tim Göbel	Germany	0.169	6.66	
	7	Patrik Lövgren	Sweden		DNS	
