= Heisen =

Heisen is a surname. Notable people with the surname include:

- Maarten Heisen (born 1984), Dutch sprinter
- Vivian Heisen (born 1993), German tennis player
