= Patrick van Balkom =

Dutch sprinter (born 1974)

Personal information
- Full name: Patrick Petrus Marinus van Balkom
- Born: 14 September 1974 (age 52) Waalwijk, Netherlands
- Years active: 1986–2006
- Height: 1.84 m (6 ft 0 in)
- Weight: 80 kg (176 lb)

Achievements and titles
- Personal bests: 100m – 10.23 (1998); 200m – 20.36 (1999, 2000, 2001); 400m – 46.80 (2003)
Medal record
Men's athletics
Representing Netherlands
World Championships
Bronze medal – third place	2003 Paris	4x100 m relay
World Indoor Championships
Bronze medal – third place	2001 Lisbon	200 m
Universiade
Silver medal – second place	1999 Palma de Mallorca	200 m
- Updated on 19 March 2008

Patrick Petrus Marinus van Balkom (born 14 September 1974) is a former Dutch sprinter. Together with Caimin Douglas, Timothy Beck and Troy Douglas he won a bronze medal in 4 x 100 metres relay at the 2003 World Championships in Athletics. With this same team he also participated in the 4 x 100 meters relay at the 2004 Summer Olympics, but they were eliminated in the series due to a mistake in the changing area and did not qualify for the final.

Van Balkom also won a 200 metres bronze medal at the 2001 IAAF World Indoor Championships. On 3 September 2006, he ran his last race at the Arena Games in Hilversum.

Van Balkom was born in Waalwijk, North Brabant.

== Personal bests ==
- 100 metres – 10.23 (1998)
- 200 metres – 20.36 (1999, 2000, 2001)
- 400 metres – 46.80 (2003)
