= Patrick van Luijk =

Dutch sprinter (born 1984)

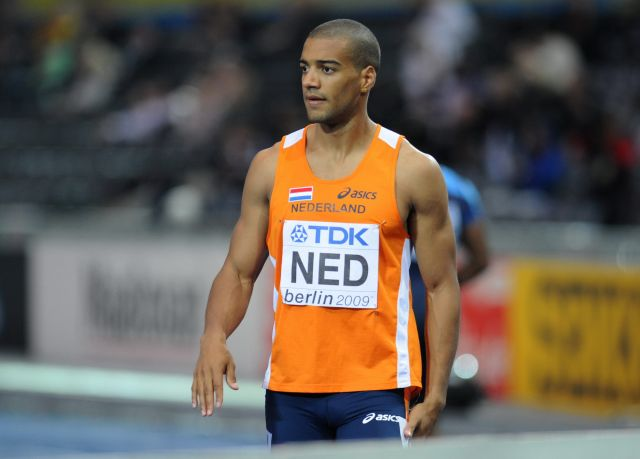
- Van Luijk in 2009

Personal information
- Full name: Patrick Jermaine Herschel van Luijk
- Born: 17 September 1984 (age 41) Spijkenisse, Netherlands
- Height: 1.89 m (6 ft 2 in)
- Weight: 88 kg (194 lb)

Achievements and titles
- Personal bests: 100 m - 10.25 (2008); 200 m - 20.47 (2012)
Medal record
European Championships
Gold medal – first place	2012 Helsinki	4 × 100 m relay
Silver medal – second place	2012 Helsinki	200 m
- Updated on 2 July 2012

Patrick Jermaine Herschel van Luijk (born 17 September 1984) is a Dutch sprinter.

== Biography ==
Patrick van Luijk was born in Spijkenisse to a Dutch mother and a Jamaican father. Sports have always been the most important hobby of Van Luijk and he started with football at an early age for local team FC Bakestijn. He continued his career at Xerxes and later, when his friends joined Sparta Rotterdam he was scouted by Feyenoord and he played in their youth squads for a few years. Because he did not feel at home at Feyenoord he played for RVVH Ridderkerk for a while before joining FC Dordrecht. Because his education was suffering from all the football commitments he decided to slow down on it and focus on his school again.

He felt it was time for a change and fighting sports got his interest at first. For three years he practiced ninjutsu, but he did not know if he would feel like continuing in the sport. When his former girlfriend told him about sprinting he was unsure if another change in sports would be a smart thing. After asking several more times he finally decided to do an athletics trial with a friend in which they did all athletics disciplines from shot put to long jump and from high jump to javelin throw. The last and final event was the sprint and he was addicted straight away.

As of October 2004 he started becoming active as a sprinter, training twice a week. It didn't take him a long time to become the fastest runner at the team and this encouraged him to become better. In local meetings with other teams however he was not able to win yet and because he always wanted to win he decided to join a better team named Rotterdam Atletiek. From February 2005 he is coached by Errol Esajas and since that time he is training six times a week instead of the two times before. This resulted in his participation at the European Championships of 2006 after only being active in the sport for two years. At the European Championships he reached the final with the 4 × 100 metres relay team together with Timothy Beck, Caimin Douglas and Guus Hoogmoed. In the final they finished in eighth position with 39.64 while they had been running 38.85 in the semi-final. Van Luijk also participated at the 200 metres where he was eliminated in the second round.

In 2007 Van Luijk won his first national title at the 60 metres indoor and a year later he tried to defend his title, but he came only 0.004 too short on Guus Hoogmoed to finish in second position that time. Later in 2008 he became the Dutch national champion over 100 and 200 metres outdoor, claiming his second and third title. The 4 × 100 metres relay team together with teammates Maarten Heisen, Caimin Douglas and Guus Hoogmoed (Gregory Sedoc and Virgil Spier as reserves) did qualify for the Olympics. Initially they finished in 17th position during the qualification process while only the first 16 teams would qualify, but due to the cancellation of the Australian team they were allowed to start in Beijing. In their qualification heat Heisen, Hoogmoed, Van Luijk and Douglas placed third in behind Trinidad and Tobago and Japan, but in front of Brazil. Their time of 38.87 was the fifth fastest out of all sixteen participating nations in the first round and they qualified for the final. In the final, the second baton change between Hoogmoed and Van Luijk failed, resulting in a slow time. They still finished the race to place seventh, before the disqualified Chinese team.

== Personal bests ==
Outdoor

- 100 metres - 10.25 (2008, Leiria)
- 200 metres - 20.47 (2012, Leiden)

Indoor

- 60 metres - 6.66 (2011, Apeldoorn; 2011, Zoetermeer; 2009, Apeldoorn)

== Honours ==
- (gold) 60 metres (indoor) - Dutch National Championships, 2007
- (silver) 60 metres (indoor) - Dutch National Championships, 2008
- (gold) 100 metres - Dutch National Championships, 2008
- (gold) 200 metres - Dutch National Championships, 2008
- (silver) 200 metres - European Athletics Championships, 2012
- (gold) 4 × 100 metres - European Athletics Championships, 2012
