= Grenada Invitational =

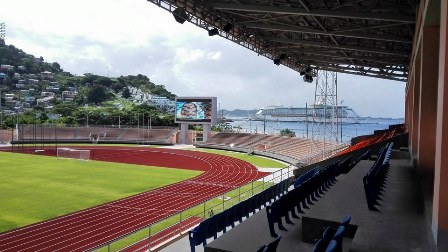
- Kirani James Athletic Stadium, Grenada
- Date: April
- Location: St. George's, Grenada
- Event type: Track and field
- Established: 2017

The Grenada Invitational is an annual track and field competition held at the Kirani James Athletic Stadium in St. George's, Grenada as part of the NACAC Outdoor Area Permit Meet Series.

The Grenada Invitational, with Michael Bascombe as the brainchild and main organiser, was first organised and held on April 8, 2017.

More than 100 athletes competed in the inaugural event which was televised on US Sports Network ESPN.

From its inception to the present day, the Grenada Invitational has attracted world record holders and Olympic medallists. Initially attracting top stars as Kirani James, Justin Gatlin, Kim Collins, Veronica Campbell-Brown, and Asafa Powell while Tori Bowie and Kori Carter were among recent competitors. Numerous Olympic, World and Commonwealth Championship level athletes continue to take part on an annual basis.

The second staging of the international track and field meet was held on April 21, 2018.

The most recent edition of the Grenada Invitational was held on April 13, 2019.

== Meet records ==
=== Men ===
Event	Record	Athlete	Nationality	Date	Ref
100 m	10.05 (+0.5 m/s)	Justin Gatlin	United States	21 April 2018	
200 m	20.16 (+1.0 m/s)	Miguel Francis	Antigua and Barbuda	13 April 2019	
400 m	44.26	Steven Gardiner	Bahamas	8 April 2017	
800 m	1:46.80	Ryan Sanchez	Puerto Rico	21 April 2018	
110 m hurdles	13.53 (-1.0 m/s)	Milan Ristic	Serbia	21 April 2018	
400 m hurdles	48.80	Quincy Downing	United States	8 April 2017	
Long jump	8.02 m (+0.9 m/s)	Mike Hartfield	United States	21 April 2018	
Javelin throw	78.71 m	Janeil Craigg	Barbados	8 April 2017	
4 × 400 m relay	3:21.58	Christ Church Foundation	Barbados	21 April 2018	

=== Women ===
Event	Record	Athlete	Nationality	Date	Ref
100 m	11.35 (+0.9 m/s)	Jade Bailey	Barbados	8 April 2017	
200 m	22.60 (+1.0 m/s)	Felicia Brown	United States	8 April 2017	
400 m	51.45	Shamier Little	United States	21 April 2018	
800 m	2:02.84	Carly Muscaro	United States	21 April 2018	
3000 m	9:46.60	Rolanda Bell	Panama	8 April 2017	
100 m hurdles	12.68 (+0.4 m/s)	Sharika Nelvis	United States	8 April 2017	
400 m hurdles	54.78	Ashley Spencer	United States	8 April 2017	
High jump	1.88 m	Levern Spencer	Saint Lucia	8 April 2017	
Triple jump	14.04 m (+1.0 m/s)	Liadagmis Povea	Cuba	21 April 2018	
4 × 400 m relay	4:03.57	McDonald College	Grenada	8 April 2017	
