= Andrea Rabino =

Italian sprinter

Personal information
- Nickname: Tony
- National team: Italy: 9 caps (1999-2004)
- Born: 23 April 1978 (age 48) Carpi, Italy

Sport
- Country: Italy
- Sport: Athletics
- Event: Sprint
- Club: C.S. Carabinieri; AS La Fratellanza 1874

Achievements and titles
- Personal bests: 60 m indoor: 6,64 (2003); 100 m: 10.30 (2000)
Medal record
Event	1st	2nd	3rd
Universiade	0	0	1
Military World Games	1	0	0
Total	1	0	1

Andrea Rabino (born 23 March 1978) is a former Italian sprinter who won two medals at International senior level a participate at two edition of the World Indoor Championships and two of the European Athletics Indoor Championships when he was finalist in Vienna 2002.

== Biography ==
He also won two national titles at senior level.

== National records ==
- 50 metres: 5.78 ( (France) Liévin, 28 February 2004) - current holder

== Achievements ==
Year	Competition	Venue	Position	Event	Time	Notes
1999	Military World Games	(Croatia) Zagreb	1st	4×100 m relay	39.92	CR
2000	European Indoor Championships	(Belgium) Ghent	SF (12th)	60 m	6.74	(Note: He ran a better crono (6.70 his Season Best) in heats and semifinal.)
2001	Universiade	(China) Beijing	QF	100 m	10.71	(Note: He ran a better crono (10.54) in heats.)
2001	Universiade	(China) Beijing	3rd	4×100 m relay	39.35	
2002	European Indoor Championships	(Austria) Vienna	8th	60 m	6.73	(Note: He ran a better crono (6.70) in heats.)
2003	World Indoor Championships	(United Kingdom) Birmingham	SF (21st)	60 m	6.73	(Note: He ran a better crono (6.70) in heats.)
2004	World Indoor Championships	(Hungary) Budapest	SF (15th)	60 m	6.69	(Note: He ran a better crono (6.66) in heats.)

== National titles ==
- Italian Athletics Indoor Championships
  - 60 metres: 1999, 2003

== See also ==
- List of Italian records in athletics
- Italian national track relay team
- Italy at the Military World Games
