= Zbigniew Tulin =

Polish sprinter

Personal information
- Nationality: Polish
- Born: 1 April 1976 (age 50)

Sport
- Sport: Sprinting
- Event: 4 × 100 metres relay

Zbigniew Tulin (born 1 April 1976) is a Polish sprinter. He competed in the men's 4 × 100 metres relay at the 2004 Summer Olympics.
