= Athletics at the 2004 Summer Olympics – Men's 4 × 100 metres relay =

Men's 4 × 100 metres relay at the Games of the XXVIII Olympiad
- Olympic Athletics
- Venue: Athens Olympic Stadium
- Dates: 27 August 2004 (round 1); 28 August 2004 (final)
- Competitors: 65 from 16 nations
- Winning time: 38.07

Medalists
1st place, gold medalist(s)		Jason Gardener, Darren Campbell, Marlon Devonish, Mark Lewis-Francis	Great Britain
2nd place, silver medalist(s)		Shawn Crawford, Justin Gatlin, Coby Miller, Maurice Greene, Darvis Patton* * only competed in the preliminary heats.	United States
3rd place, bronze medalist(s)		Olusoji Fasuba, Uchenna Emedolu, Aaron Egbele, Deji Aliu	Nigeria

Official Video

The men's 4 × 100 metres relay at the 2004 Summer Olympics as part of the athletics program was held at the Athens Olympic Stadium from August 27 to 28. The sixteen teams competed in a two-heat qualifying round in which the first three teams from each heat, together with the next two fastest teams, were given a place in the final race.

The Great Britain quartet of Jason Gardener, Darren Campbell, Mark Lewis-Francis, and Marlon Devonish produced superior exchanges to beat the United States team by 0.01 seconds in a time of 38.07 seconds. The final also saw the U.S. team struggling with their relay duties, when Justin Gatlin and Coby Miller botched their baton handoff after the second leg, as Miller went too early and had to slow down to avoid disqualification from passing outside of the designated zone, leaving the British team to command their lead towards the final bend. By the time Greene received the baton from Miller on the anchor leg, he burst down the home stretch to chase Lewis-Francis at the finish line, but could not get ahead despite his lower leg and head having crossed the line first, as the Americans fell short by just a hundredth of a second.

== Records ==
Prior to the competition, the existing World and Olympic records were as follows:

World record	United States (USA); Michael Marsh; Leroy Burrell; Dennis Mitchell; Carl Lewis	37.40 s	Barcelona, Spain	6 August 1992
Olympic record	United States; Michael Marsh; Leroy Burrell; Dennis Mitchell; Carl Lewis	37.40 s	Barcelona, Spain	6 August 1992

No new records were set during the competition.

== Qualification ==
The qualification period for athletics was 1 January 2003 to 9 August 2004. A National Olympic Committee (NOC) could enter one qualified relay team per relay event, with a maximum of six athletes. For this event, an NOC would be invited to participate with a relay team if the average of the team's two best times, obtained in IAAF-sanctioned meetings or tournaments, would be among the best sixteen, at the end of this period.

== Schedule ==
All times are Greece Standard Time (UTC+2)

Date	Time	Round
Friday, 27 August 2004	20:10	Round 1
Saturday, 28 August 2004	21:45	Final

== Results ==
=== Round 1 ===
Qualification rule: The first three teams in each heat (Q) plus the next two fastest overall (q) moved on to the final.

==== Heat 1 ====
Rank	Lane	Nation	Competitors	Time	Notes
1	2	Nigeria	Olusoji Fasuba, Uchenna Emedolu, Aaron Egbele, Deji Aliu	38.27	Q, SB
2	1	Poland	Zbigniew Tulin, Łukasz Chyła, Marcin Jędrusiński, Marcin Urbaś	38.47	Q, SB
3	7	Australia	Adam Basil, Paul di Bella, Patrick Johnson, Josh Ross	38.49	Q, SB
4	3	Trinidad and Tobago	Nicconnor Alexander, Marc Burns, Ato Boldon, Darrel Brown	38.53	q, =NR
5	4	Japan	Hiroyasu Tsuchie, Shingo Suetsugu, Shinji Takahira, Nobuharu Asahara	38.53	q
6	5	Germany	Ronny Ostwald, Tobias Unger, Alexander Kosenkow, Till Helmke	38.64	
7	8	Canada	Nicolas Macrozonaris, Anson Henry, Charles Allen, Pierre Browne	38.64	SB
8	6	Russia	Aleksandr Ryabov, Oleg Sergeyev, Sergey Bychkov, Andrey Yepishin	39.19	

==== Heat 2 ====
Rank	Lane	Nation	Competitors	Time	Notes
1	6	United States	Shawn Crawford, Darvis Patton, Coby Miller, Maurice Greene	38.02	Q
2	1	Great Britain	Jason Gardener, Darren Campbell, Marlon Devonish, Mark Lewis-Francis	38.53	Q, SB
3	8	Brazil	Cláudio Roberto Souza, Édson Ribeiro, André da Silva, Vicente de Lima	38.64	Q
4	2	Jamaica	Dwight Thomas, Patrick Jarrett, Winston Smith, Michael Frater	38.71	SB
5	5	Italy	Marco Torrieri, Simone Collio, Massimiliano Donati, Maurizio Checcucci	38.79	
6	7	Ghana	Christian Nsiah, Tanko Braimah, Aziz Zakari, Leonard Myles-Mills	38.88	SB
7	4	France	Issa-Aimé Nthépé, Ronald Pognon, Frédéric Krantz, David Alerte	38.93	
	3	Netherlands	Timothy Beck, Troy Douglas, Patrick van Balkom, Caimin Douglas	DNF	

=== Final ===
Rank	Lane	Nation	Competitors	Time	Notes
1st place, gold medalist(s)	3	Great Britain	Jason Gardener, Darren Campbell, Marlon Devonish, Mark Lewis-Francis	38.07	SB
2nd place, silver medalist(s)	5	United States	Shawn Crawford, Justin Gatlin, Coby Miller, Maurice Greene	38.08	
3rd place, bronze medalist(s)	4	Nigeria	Olusoji Fasuba, Uchenna Emedolu, Aaron Egbele, Deji Aliu	38.23	SB
4	7	Japan	Hiroyasu Tsuchie, Shingo Suetsugu, Shinji Takahira, Nobuharu Asahara	38.49	
5	6	Poland	Zbigniew Tulin, Łukasz Chyła, Marcin Jędrusiński, Marcin Urbaś	38.54	
6	1	Australia	Adam Basil, Paul di Bella, Patrick Johnson, Josh Ross	38.56	
7	8	Trinidad and Tobago	Nicconnor Alexander, Marc Burns, Ato Boldon, Darrel Brown	38.60	
8	2	Brazil	Cláudio Roberto Souza, Édson Ribeiro, André da Silva, Vicente de Lima	38.67	
