= 2004 IAAF World Indoor Championships – Men's 60 metres =

The Men's 60 metres event at the 2004 IAAF World Indoor Championships was held on March 5.

== Medalists ==
Gold	Silver	Bronze
Jason Gardener; Great Britain	Shawn Crawford; United States	Georgios Theodoridis; Greece

== Results ==
=== Heat ===
First 2 of each heat (Q) and next 8 fastest (q) qualified for the semifinals.

Rank	Heat	Name	Nationality	Time	Notes
1	5	Shawn Crawford	United States	6.52	Q
2	5	Niconnor Alexander	Trinidad and Tobago	6.55	Q, PB
3	3	Jason Gardener	Great Britain	6.56	Q
4	1	Matic Osovnikar	Slovenia	6.60	Q, NR
4	8	Asafa Powell	Jamaica	6.60	Q
6	1	Łukasz Chyła	Poland	6.63	Q
6	2	Francis Obikwelu	Portugal	6.63	Q
6	4	Georgios Theodoridis	Greece	6.63	Q
6	6	Kareem Streete-Thompson	Cayman Islands	6.63	Q
10	2	Eric Nkansah	Ghana	6.64	Q
10	8	Andrey Epishin	Russia	6.64	Q, PB
12	3	Roland Németh	Hungary	6.65	Q
12	8	Simone Collio	Italy	6.65	q
14	6	Andrea Rabino	Italy	6.66	Q
15	6	Mickey Grimes	United States	6.66	q
16	4	Ronny Ostwald	Germany	6.67	Q
16	5	Nicolas Macrozonaris	Canada	6.67	q
18	8	Dejan Vojnović	Croatia	6.69	q
19	3	Cláudio Roberto Souza	Brazil	6.70	q
20	3	Aaron Egbele	Nigeria	6.71	q
21	2	Aggelos Pavlakakis	Greece	6.72	
21	5	Luéyi Dovy	France	6.72	q
21	8	Stéphane Buckland	Mauritius	6.72	q, PB
24	1	Ronald Pognon	France	6.73	
24	7	Gábor Dobos	Hungary	6.73	Q
26	2	Gennadiy Chernovol	Kazakhstan	6.74	
26	5	Anthony Ferro	Belgium	6.74	
28	1	Venancio José	Spain	6.76	
28	4	Leonard Myles-Mills	Ghana	6.76	
28	4	Jarbas Mascarenhas	Brazil	6.76	
28	6	Matic Šušteršic	Slovenia	6.76	
28	7	Tyrone Edgar	Great Britain	6.76	Q
33	7	Nathan Bongelo	Belgium	6.77	
34	1	Olusoji Fasuba	Nigeria	6.78	
35	5	Aleksandr Ryabov	Russia	6.79	
36	7	Kostyantyn Rurak	Ukraine	6.80	
36	8	Lok To Wai	Hong Kong	6.80	
38	3	Prodromos Katsantonis	Cyprus	6.81	
39	6	Gary Ryan	Ireland	6.83	
40	8	Diego Ferreira	Paraguay	6.86	
41	4	Aiah Yambasu	Sierra Leone	6.87	
42	6	Darren Gilford	Malta	6.88	
43	4	Seksan Wongsala	Thailand	6.92	PB
43	5	Souhalia Alamou	Benin	6.92	PB
43	7	Sherwin James	Dominica	6.92	
46	3	Bob Colville	Costa Rica	6.97	NR
47	2	Delwayne Delaney	Saint Kitts and Nevis	6.99	
48	6	Gian Nicola Berardi	San Marino	7.01	
49	7	Jack Howard	Federated States of Micronesia	7.02	
50	7	Amr Mohamed Gharseldin	Egypt	7.02	
51	2	Sébastien Gattuso	Monaco	7.03	PB
52	2	Mohamad Tamim	Lebanon	7.08	NR
53	5	Djikoloum Mobele	Chad	7.20	PB
54	8	Khalil Al-Hanahneh	Jordan	7.22	PB
55	1	Harmon Harmon	Cook Islands	7.23	PB
56	7	Surendra Bahadur Thanait	Nepal	7.25	PB
57	3	Mohamed Ould Brahim	Mauritania	7.37	PB
58	1	Fagamanu Sofai	Samoa	7.65	PB
99	1	Massoud Azizi	Afghanistan	DNS	
99	2	Antonio Ichiou	Northern Mariana Islands	DNS	
99	4	John Ertzgaard	Norway	DNS	
99	6	Roger Angouono-Moke	Republic of the Congo	DNS	

=== Semifinals ===
First 2 of each semifinal (Q) and next 2 fastest (q) qualified for the final.

Rank	Heat	Name	Nationality	Time	Notes
1	1	Jason Gardener	Great Britain	6.49	Q
2	3	Shawn Crawford	United States	6.54	Q
3	3	Georgios Theodoridis	Greece	6.55	Q
4	3	Simone Collio	Italy	6.58	q, PB
5	1	Francis Obikwelu	Portugal	6.60	Q
5	2	Matic Osovnikar	Slovenia	6.60	Q, =NR
7	2	Niconnor Alexander	Trinidad and Tobago	6.61	Q
8	1	Mickey Grimes	United States	6.62	q
9	3	Andrey Epishin	Russia	6.63	PB
10	3	Roland Németh	Hungary	6.63	SB
11	3	Kareem Streete-Thompson	Cayman Islands	6.64	
12	2	Ronny Ostwald	Germany	6.66	
13	1	Eric Nkansah	Ghana	6.67	
13	2	Cláudio Roberto Souza	Brazil	6.67	
15	1	Andrea Rabino	Italy	6.69	
16	2	Asafa Powell	Jamaica	6.71	
17	1	Gábor Dobos	Hungary	6.73	
17	2	Łukasz Chyła	Poland	6.73	
19	3	Stéphane Buckland	Mauritius	6.75	
20	1	Luéyi Dovy	France	6.76	
21	1	Dejan Vojnović	Croatia	6.78	
21	2	Aaron Egbele	Nigeria	6.78	
23	2	Tyrone Edgar	Great Britain	6.84	
24	3	Nicolas Macrozonaris	Canada	7.23	

=== Final ===
Rank	Lane	Name	Nationality	Time	React	Notes
1st place, gold medalist(s)	3	Jason Gardener	Great Britain	6.49	0.144	
2nd place, silver medalist(s)	6	Shawn Crawford	United States	6.52	0.158	
3rd place, bronze medalist(s)	4	Georgios Theodoridis	Greece	6.54	0.139	SB
4	8	Mickey Grimes	United States	6.55	0.139	PB
5	5	Matic Osovnikar	Slovenia	6.58	0.131	NR
6	1	Francis Obikwelu	Portugal	6.60	0.154	
7	2	Simone Collio	Italy	6.60	0.142	
8	7	Niconnor Alexander	Trinidad and Tobago	6.76	0.139	
