= Jason Gardener =

British sprinter (born 1975)

Jason Gardener MBE
Personal information
- Nationality: British (English)
- Born: 18 September 1975 (age 50) Bath, England
- Height: 176 cm (5 ft 9 in)
- Weight: 75 kg (165 lb)

Sport
- Sport: Athletics
- Event: Sprints
- Club: Wessex and Bath AC
Medal record
Men's athletics
Representing Great Britain
Olympic Games
Gold medal – first place	2004 Athens	4 × 100 m relay
World Championships
Silver medal – second place	1999 Sevilla	4 × 100 m relay
Bronze medal – third place	2005 Helsinki	4 × 100 m relay
World Indoor Championships
Gold medal – first place	2004 Budapest	60 m
Bronze medal – third place	1999 Maebashi	60 m
Bronze medal – third place	2003 Birmingham	60 m
European Indoor Championships
Gold medal – first place	2000 Ghent	60 m
Gold medal – first place	2002 Vienna	60 m
Gold medal – first place	2005 Madrid	60 m
Gold medal – first place	2007 Birmingham	60 m
Silver medal – second place	1998 Valencia	60 m
Representing England
Commonwealth Games
Gold medal – first place	1998 Kuala Lumpur	4 × 100 m relay
Gold medal – first place	2002 Manchester	4 × 100 m relay

Jason Carl Gardener, MBE (born 18 September 1975) is a retired British sprint athlete. A fast starter from the blocks, he won an Olympic gold medal leading off Great Britain in the 4 × 100 metres relay at the 2004 Olympic Games, and is also the 2004 World Indoor Champion, and a four-time European Indoor champion, at 60 metres.

== Biography ==
Gardener was born in Bath, Somerset to a Jamaican father and British mother. He was educated at Moorlands Primary School, Beechen Cliff School and the City of Bath College. He later graduated from Bath Spa University.

Gardener started his career at the World Junior Championships in 1994, where he was placed second in the individual 100 m and bettered this to take his first gold medal as part of the 4 × 100 m relay team. Joining the senior ranks, and coached by Malcolm Arnold for his entire career, Gardener took another silver in the 60 m, at the European Indoor Championships of 1998. He was not chosen for the relay team, which took gold.

In 1999 he took bronze at the World indoors in the 60 m, breaking the British record. and later that year saw him run 9.98 s breaking the 10 second barrier for the first time in the 100 m. He was also part of the national record breaking 4 × 100 m relay team along with Darren Campbell, Marlon Devonish, and Dwain Chambers that they set in Seville, Spain running 37.73 seconds.

2000 saw Gardener go one better in the European indoor 60 m taking gold as well as breaking the national 50 m record with a time of 5.61 s. Unfortunately he became injured during the summer and although making it to Sydney for the Olympics he did not progress through the early rounds.

He retained his European indoor title in 2002 as well as a 4 × 100 m Commonwealth Games gold medal. 2003 saw another World indoors bronze despite being hampered by a hamstring injury but the following year he bettered this to take the gold, his first world individual title ahead of the fancied Shawn Crawford of the US.

Gardener made the squad for the 2004 Summer Olympics where he competed in the 100 m and won the gold medal in the 4 × 100 m relay with Darren Campbell, Marlon Devonish and Mark Lewis-Francis in a 38.07 s, their season's best and a narrow upset win over the United States.

In March 2007, Gardener won his fourth European Indoor 60 m gold after fears that he may have to miss defending his title as his wife, Nancy, was due to give birth. Gardener's last professional race was a 4 × 100 m relay at the London Grand Prix at Crystal Palace on 3 August 2007. His team failed to finish this race.

Gardener was a four-times British 100 metres champion after winning the British AAA Championships title in 1997, 1999, 2004 and 2005.

On 17 October 2013, it was announced that Gardener would take part in the 100 m Sprint for Faith organised by the Pontifical Council for Culture and the Italian Sports Centre, as part of the Catholic Church's Year of Faith.

In 2017 he became an Honorary Doctor of Laws at the University of Bath.

== Personal bests ==
Date	Event	Venue	Time (seconds)
16 February 2000	50 metres	Madrid, Spain	5.61
7 March 1999	60 metres	Maebashi, Gunma, Japan	6.46
2 July 1999	100 metres	Lausanne, Switzerland	9.98
11 July 1999	200 metres	Ingolstadt, Germany	20.65

- All information from IAAF Profile

== Major achievements ==
- 1994
  - World Junior Championships – Lisbon, Portugal.
    - 100 m silver medal
    - 4 × 100 m relay gold medal
- 1995
  - European Cup – Villeneuve d'Ascq, France.
    - 4 × 100 m relay gold medal
- 1997
  - European Cup – Munich, Germany.
    - 4 × 100 m relay bronze medal
- 1998
  - European Indoor Championships – Valencia, Spain.
    - 60 m silver medal
- 1999
  - World Indoor Championships – Maebashi, Japan.
    - 60 m bronze medal
  - European Cup – Paris, France.
    - 4 × 100 m relay bronze medal
  - ran 100 m personal best of 9.98 seconds in Lausanne, Switzerland.
- 2000
  - European Indoor Championships – Ghent, Belgium.
    - 60 m gold medal
- 2002
  - European Indoor Championships – Vienna, Austria.
    - 60 m gold medal
  - Commonwealth Games – Manchester, England
    - 4 × 100 m gold medal
- 2003
  - World Indoor Championships – Birmingham, England.
    - 60 m bronze medal
- 2004
  - World Indoor Championships – Budapest, Hungary.
    - 60 m gold medal
  - Summer Olympics – Athens, Greece.
    - 4 × 100 m gold medal
- 2005
  - World Championships – Helsinki, Finland.
    - 4 × 100 m bronze medal
- 2007
  - European Indoor Championships – Birmingham, England.
    - 60 m gold medal

Gardener has also won four senior national titles indoors and two outdoors.

== Bobsleigh ==
In 2008 Jason took part in a project to qualify four athletes from diverse sports in the British 2 Man Bobsleigh Championships, after just two weeks of training. Along with World Champion track cyclist Craig MacLean, Rugby World Cup winner Dan Luger and Commonwealth Decathlon champion Dean Macey, he attempted to complete two runs down the course at Cesana Pariol in Italy (site of the 2006 Winter Olympics) to gain qualification to the finals. Selected as pusher for driver Macey, he succeeded in finishing in sixth place overall, as well as being the highest placed novice pair. The story was filmed for the BBC and broadcast in February 2009. Jason declined an offer to try and qualify for the next Winter Olympics in 2010.
