= Justin Gatlin =

American sprinter (born 1982)

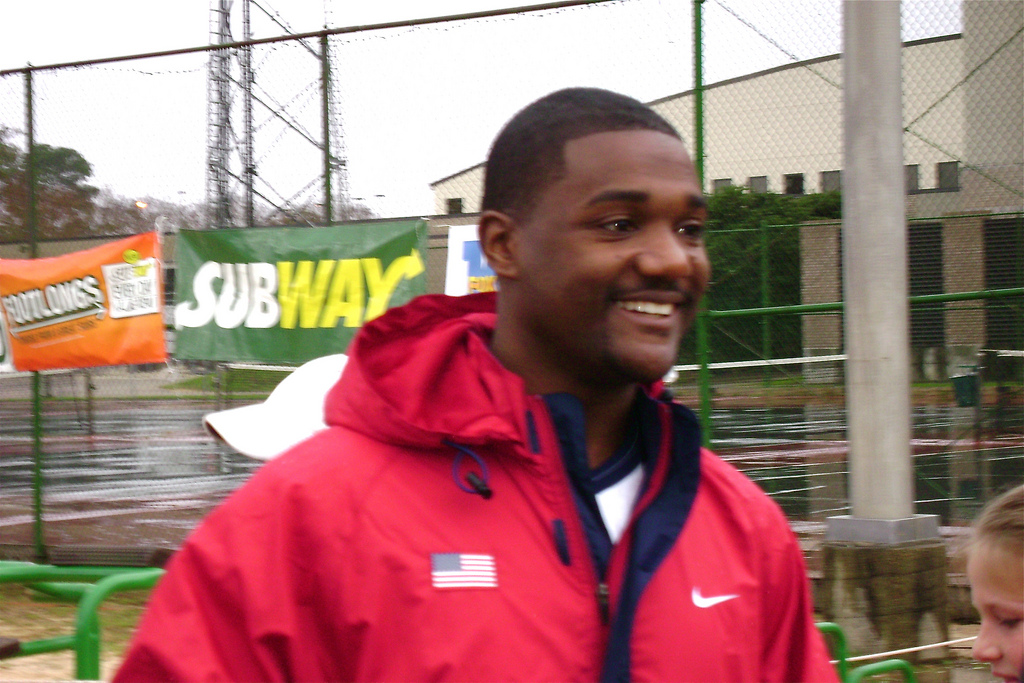
- Gatlin in 2009

Personal information
- Born: February 10, 1982 (age 44) Brooklyn, New York, U.S.
- Height: 6 ft 1 in (185 cm)
- Weight: 183 lb (83 kg)

Sport
- Sport: Track and field
- Event: Sprints
- College team: University of Tennessee Volunteers
- Team: Nike
- Coached by: Dennis Mitchell
- Retired: 2022

Achievements and titles
- Personal bests: 60 m: 6.45 (Boston 2003); 100 m: 9.74 (Doha 2015); 200 m: 19.57 (Eugene 2015); 400 m: 48.02 (Tampa 2019)
Medal record
Men's athletics
Representing the United States
| Event | 1st | 2nd | 3rd |
|---|---|---|---|
| Olympic Games | 1 | 2 | 2 |
| World Championships | 4 | 6 | 0 |
| World Indoor Championships | 2 | 0 | 0 |
| World Athletics Relays | 2 | 1 | 0 |
| Total | 9 | 9 | 2 |
| Event | 1st | 2nd | 3rd |
|---|---|---|---|
| 60 m | 2 | 0 | 0 |
| 100 m | 3 | 4 | 1 |
| 200 m | 1 | 1 | 1 |
| 4 × 100 m relay | 3 | 4 | 0 |
| Total | 9 | 9 | 2 |
Olympic Games
| Gold medal – first place | 2004 Athens | 100 m |
| Silver medal – second place | 2004 Athens | 4 × 100 m relay |
| Silver medal – second place | 2016 Rio de Janeiro | 100 m |
| Bronze medal – third place | 2004 Athens | 200 m |
| Bronze medal – third place | 2012 London | 100 m |
World Championships
| Gold medal – first place | 2005 Helsinki | 100 m |
| Gold medal – first place | 2005 Helsinki | 200 m |
| Gold medal – first place | 2017 London | 100 m |
| Gold medal – first place | 2019 Doha | 4 × 100 m relay |
| Silver medal – second place | 2013 Moscow | 100 m |
| Silver medal – second place | 2013 Moscow | 4 × 100 m relay |
| Silver medal – second place | 2015 Beijing | 100 m |
| Silver medal – second place | 2015 Beijing | 200 m |
| Silver medal – second place | 2017 London | 4 × 100 m relay |
| Silver medal – second place | 2019 Doha | 100 m |
World Indoor Championships
| Gold medal – first place | 2003 Birmingham | 60 m |
| Gold medal – first place | 2012 Istanbul | 60 m |
World Athletics Relays
| Gold medal – first place | 2015 Nassau | 4 × 100 m relay |
| Gold medal – first place | 2017 Nassau | 4 × 100 m relay |
| Silver medal – second place | 2019 Yokohama | 4 × 100 m relay |
Diamond League
| Winner | 2013 | 100 m |
| Winner | 2014 | 100 m |
| Winner | 2015 | 100 m |

Justin Alexander Gatlin (born February 10, 1982) is a retired American sprinter who competed in the 60 meters, 100 meters, and 200 meters. He is the 2004 Olympic Champion in the 100 meters, the 2005 and 2017 World Champion in the 100 meters, the 2005 World Champion in the 200 meters, and the 2019 World Champion in the 4 × 100 meters relay. In addition, Gatlin is the 2003 and 2012 World Indoor Champion in the 60 meters. He is a 5-time Olympic medalist and a 12-time World Championship medalist. At the World Athletics Relays, Gatlin won two gold medals in the 4 × 100 meters relay in 2015 and 2017. Gatlin is also a record 3-time Diamond League Champion in the 100 meters. He won the Diamond League trophy in 2013, 2014 and 2015.

Justin Gatlin's personal best of 9.74 seconds ranks fifth on the all-time list of male 100-meter athletes. He is a two-time 100 meters World Champion (2005 & 2017) and a two-time 60 metres World Indoor Champion (2003 & 2012). Gatlin won both the 100 meters and 200 meters at the 2005 World Championships. He is also a World Champion in the 4 × 100 meters relay, which the United States of America team won at the 2019 World Championships.

In 2001, he incurred a two-year ban from athletics for testing positive for amphetamines, later reduced to one year because of an appeal. In 2006, he incurred a further four-year ban for testing positive for testosterone, with this sanction erasing his then-world-record time of 9.77 seconds in the 100 meters.

Gatlin returned to competition in August 2010. In June 2012 at the US Olympic trials, Gatlin ran a time of 9.80 seconds for 100 metres. In May 2015 at the IAAF Doha Diamond League Gatlin broke this personal record for 100 metres by running 9.74 seconds, which remains Gatlin's personal best over the distance.

Gatlin won the gold medal in the 100 metres at the 2004 Olympics. At the London 2012 Olympics, he ran a time of 9.79 seconds, earning a bronze medal. He won his third Olympic medal in the 100 meters in the 2016 Olympic 100-meter final, finishing with the silver. At 34, he became the oldest man to win an Olympic medal in a non-relay sprint event. At the age of 35, Gatlin won the gold medal in the 100 meters at the 2017 World Championships, 12 years after his first triumph in the event. At the 2019 World Championships, Gatlin won the silver medal in the 100 m in a time of 9.89, making him the most decorated 100 m sprinter in World Championship history, with a record of five individual 100 m medals. Gatlin's tally of eight global championship 100 m medals (three Olympic and five World Championship) makes him the most decorated 100 m sprinter of all time, a feat he accomplished at the 2019 World Athletics Championships in Doha. Over his career, he made the second most sub-10-second runs (81) in the 100 m.

He announced his retirement from the sport in 2022 on his 40th birthday.

== Early career ==
=== High school and collegiate career ===
Gatlin attended Woodham High School in Pensacola, Florida, where he competed as a hurdler. He was eventually noticed by University of Tennessee coaches Vince Anderson and Bill Webb, who awarded him a scholarship and trained him to become a sprinter rather than a hurdler. In 2001, in his freshman year at Tennessee, Gatlin won NCAA outdoor titles in both the 100 meters (10.08 s) and 200 meters (20.11 s).

=== Amphetamines ban ===
Not long after, Gatlin was banned from international competition for two years by the IAAF after testing positive for amphetamines. Gatlin appealed on the grounds that the positive test had been due to medication that he had been taking since his childhood, when he was diagnosed with attention deficit disorder. The appeal resulted in an early reinstatement by the IAAF. Gatlin was banned from international competition, but was still allowed to compete nationally as an NCAA athlete, and he went on to win 4 more NCAA titles; however, these do not count for records purposes on his international profile.

In an unexpected move, Gatlin decided to turn professional after his sophomore season, foregoing his remaining two years of collegiate eligibility. He moved to Florida to begin training with new coach Trevor Graham.

== Professional career ==
=== 2003: World Indoor Champion ===
In his first indoor season as a professional athlete, Gatlin won the national 60 meters title in Boston in 6.45 seconds, a personal best. 2 weeks later, Gatlin stormed to his first world title, clocking 6.46 at the World Indoor Championships in Birmingham.

Not long after, Gatlin suffered a hamstring injury and was forced to miss the 2003 National Championships in Palo Alto, meaning he would miss the World Championships in Paris as well. On August 15, despite a very inconsistent few months, Gatlin finally broke ten seconds in the 100 meters for the first time, with 9.97 at the Weltklasse Zürich. In order to fully recover and prepare for next year's Olympic Games in Athens, Gatlin and his coach decided to skip the 2004 indoor season.

=== 2004: Olympic Champion ===
Gatlin's plan worked and he qualified for the 2004 Summer Olympics in Athens, after finishing 2nd in both the 100 meters and 200 meters at the Olympic Trials in Sacramento. The following month, Gatlin made history and won the Olympic 100 meter title in 9.85 seconds, a new personal best, only one hundredth slower than the Olympic record. The finish was incredibly tight, with Francis Obikwelu of Portugal one hundredth behind for the silver medal, his teammate and defending champion Maurice Greene another hundredth back for the bronze medal, and his other teammate Shawn Crawford another two hundredths back for 4th place. In the 200 meters, Gatlin won the bronze medal, completing an American sweep of the podium behind Crawford (Gold) and Bernard Williams (Silver) Finally, he won the silver medal as a member of the 4 × 100 meters relay squad.

In the fall of 2004, Gatlin graduated from Tennessee.

=== 2005: World Champion ===
With an Olympic title under his belt, Gatlin was favored for the 100 meter title at the 2005 World Championships in Helsinki, along with Asafa Powell of Jamaica, who broke the 100 m world record. Gatlin won the 100/200 double at the 2005 National Championships in Carson; his first national outdoor titles. Then, Powell pulled out of the world championships due to injury, effectively removing any opposition to Gatlin. He went on to win the 100 in 9.88, a season's best; his winning margin of 0.17 seconds was the widest in world championship 100 m history. With Crawford not entered, Gatlin won the 200 as well, becoming the second man in history to win both events at a single world championships. His fellow Americans also took the 2nd, 3rd and 4th places, the first time any nation had swept the top 4 positions at a world championship.

=== 2006: World Record ===
On May 12, at the Qatar Athletic Super Grand Prix, Gatlin initially broke the 100-meter world record with 9.76 seconds, one hundredth faster than Powell's record of 9.77 set the previous year. 4 days later however, the IAAF revealed on that his time had been 9.766 seconds, which was subsequently rounded up to 9.77, in line with regulations. Shortly thereafter, with the track and field community itching for a Gatlin-Powell showdown, the two both appeared at the Prefontaine Classic in Oregon. No agreement could be reached with the meet organizers, however, so the two competed in separate heats. Gatlin won the event with a time of 9.88 seconds over Powell's 9.93 seconds.

=== 2006 doping ban ===
On July 29, a month after winning the US title, Gatlin told the media that he had been informed by the USADA that he had given a positive doping test in April the same year. He claimed his innocence in the matter:

I cannot account for these results, because I have never knowingly used any banned substance or authorized anyone to administer such a substance to me.

It is believed that the substance that Gatlin tested positive for was "testosterone or its precursor." The failed test was revealed after a relay race on April 22, 2006, in Lawrence, Kansas. The "B" sample was confirmed as positive in July.

Gatlin's coach, Trevor Graham, had eight athletes who had tested positive or received bans for performance-enhancing drugs. After Gatlin's failed test, Graham stated in an interview that Gatlin had been sabotaged. He blamed massage therapist Christopher Whetstine for rubbing a cream containing testosterone onto Gatlin's buttocks without his knowledge. The therapist denied the claim, saying: "Trevor Graham is not speaking on behalf of Justin Gatlin and the story about me is not true."

On August 22, Gatlin accepted an eight-year ban from track and field, avoiding a lifetime ban in exchange for his cooperation with the doping authorities, and because of the "exceptional circumstances" surrounding his first positive drug test. Gatlin appealed against the ban; an arbitration panel reduced it to four years at a hearing in December 2007. The USADA's chief executive officer explained "Given his cooperation and the circumstances relating to Mr Gatlin's first offence, the four-year penalty issued by the arbitration panel is a fair and just outcome". His 9.77 was subsequently annulled.

On December 19, 2006, ESPN reported that Gatlin would work with Woodham High School's track team as a voluntary coach, helping his old high school with "some workouts, sprint work, block work, where he sees something and can give encouragement."

=== Possible NFL career ===
It was reported that Gatlin planned to serve his four-year ban from the track on a football field. On November 29, 2006, ESPN reported that Gatlin had worked out with the Houston Texans, although he has little football experience and "has not played football since 10th grade".

On May 4, 2007, the Tampa Bay Buccaneers announced that Gatlin was one of 28 free agents taken to their 2007 rookie camp on tryout contracts, and was considered to be the most intriguing unsigned athlete in attendance. He tried out for the team as a wide receiver. He was unsuccessful, though he stated that he believed that he had all the necessary skills and that the only reason he did not make the team was because coaches viewed him as a "track guy."

=== Comeback preparation ===
During the course of his ban, Gatlin's weight ballooned to over 200 lbs. He found a new coach in Loren Seagrave, who helped Gatlin shave his weight down to 183 lbs, his weight when he won the Olympic title 6 years prior. In his absence, Gatlin's teammate Tyson Gay took the 100, 200 and 4 × 100 meters relay titles at the 2007 World Championships in Athletics in Osaka. Then, Usain Bolt of Jamaica won the 100, 200 and 4 × 100 meters relay in historic world record times at the 2008 Summer Olympic in Beijing, then did it again the following year at the World Championships in Berlin. Gatlin was preparing to go up against a new generation of talent in both Bolt and his Jamaican teammates.

=== 2010 and 2011: Comeback ===
On August 3, 2010, Gatlin made his return to the athletics circuit with a tour of Estonia and Finland. He won the 100 meters in Rakvere, recording 10.24 seconds. At the Ergo World Challenge meeting in Tallinn he improved further with a win in 10.17 seconds. His coach, Loren Seagrave, acknowledged that the sprinter's starts were poor, but that Gatlin's finish to the race remained strong. Running at the final meet of the Finnish Elite Games series in Joensuu, Gatlin won in the absence of injured Steve Mullings. In Rovereto, Italy, on August 31, 2010, Gatlin was placed second in the 100 meters with a time of 10.09 seconds, behind Yohan Blake, who won in 10.06 seconds.

After the 2010 season, Gatlin switched coaches to Brooks Johnson. Before the start of his 2011 outdoor season, Gatlin ran the 100 m in 9.45 s which would be a world record but was assisted by a wind turbine blasting air at 8.9 m/s. On June 25, 2011, at the 2011 USA Track & Field Championships, Gatlin was second behind Walter Dix with a season's best time of 9.95 seconds; his first sub-10 second performance in 5 years. He represented the United States at the IAAF World Championships in Daegu, South Korea, where he was eliminated in the semi-finals of the 100 meters.

=== 2012: World Indoor Champion and Return to Olympic Games ===
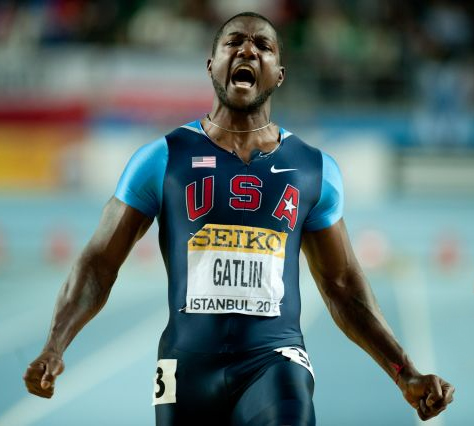
Gatlin celebrating his win at the 2012 World Indoor Championships

Under the coaching of former Olympian Dennis Mitchell, 2012 proved to be Gatlin's most successful season yet. He returned to the indoor circuit and finished second in the 60 meters at the national indoor championships in Albuquerque. Then, two weeks later, Gatlin stormed to the World Indoor Championship title in the 60 meters once again, clocking 6.46 seconds; the same time he ran to win the indoor title 9 years prior.

Outdoors, Gatlin returned to the Qatar Athletic Super Grand Prix, the same meet and venue where he broke the 100 meter world record until it was annulled. He won in 9.87 seconds, defeating Asafa Powell by one hundredth of a second. After taking wins in Daegu, Rabat, and at the Prefontaine Classic in Eugene, Gatlin placed himself as a favorite for a medal at the 2012 London Olympics. On June 24, Gatlin won the 100-meter final at the Olympic Trials in Eugene, Oregon with a personal best time of 9.80 seconds, which was then the fastest time in history for a man over 30.

On August 5, 2012, at the London 2012 Summer Olympics, he recorded a new personal best time of 9.79 seconds in the 100 meters final, when he won bronze behind Usain Bolt and Yohan Blake.

=== 2013: World Championships Silver Medalist and Diamond League Champion ===
On June 6, 2013, Gatlin beat world record holder Usain Bolt by one-hundredth of a second to win the 100 meters at the Golden Gala meet in Rome, Italy. On August 11, 2013, Gatlin won a silver medal behind Usain Bolt in the 100 meters at the IAAF World Championships in a time of 9.85. Bolt won the race in 9.77. Gatlin also took another silver in the 4 × 100-meter relay, crossing the line in 37.66 seconds, behind the Jamaican team that won in 37.36 seconds. With Diamond League victories in Doha, Eugene, Rome and Monaco in 2013, Gatlin became the Diamond League Champion in the 100 meters for the first time in his career.

=== 2014: Diamond League Champion ===
On September 5, 2014, Gatlin won the 100 meters at the IAAF Diamond League final in Brussels with a personal best of 9.77 seconds. He then went on to complete a sprint double at the meet, winning the 200 meters in a time of 19.71 seconds. This was the second fastest time of the season, behind his world lead of 19.68 that he set at the Monaco Diamond League earlier in the year. Gatlin's 9.77 time in the 100 meters time and 19.71 time in the 200 meters became the fastest single day 100 and 200 meters performance ever recorded. Gatlin's victory in the 100 meters secured him the Diamond League trophy for the second straight year. Gatlin's performances earned him a nomination for IAAF Athlete of the Year. Other athletes responded skeptically to Gatlin, questioning whether he is continuing to benefit from the banned substances taken earlier in his career. German discus champion Robert Harting requested to the IAAF that his nomination for Athlete of the Year be rescinded in protest at Gatlin being nominated.

=== 2015: Diamond League Champion, World Relays Champion and Gatlin's fastest season ===
On May 2, 2015, Gatlin won the gold medal in the 4 × 100 meters relay at the World Athletics Relays in Nassau, Bahamas. It was the first defeat for Usain Bolt and Jamaica team in the 4 × 100 meters relay since 2007. The American quartet, consisting of Mike Rodgers, Tyson Gay, Ryan Bailey and Justin Gatlin, ran a time of 37.38 to win the 4 × 100 meters relay at the World Athletics Relays. On May 15, 2015, Gatlin improved his personal best to 9.74 seconds (+0.9 m/s) at the Qatar Athletic Super Grand Prix. His time was the fastest in the world since Yohan Blake ran 9.69 seconds in August 2012. It was the ninth-best performance in history and improved Gatlin's standing as the fifth best 100 meters athlete of all time. On May 30, Gatlin equalled his 200 m personal best at the Prefontaine Classic, running 19.68, a new world lead. On June 5, 2015, Gatlin beat Usain Bolt's 100-meter 2012 Rome Diamond League record of 9.76 seconds, finishing with a time of 9.75 seconds. At the USATF Track and Field Championships, Gatlin set a new personal best in the 200 meters, running 19.57 which was the fifth fastest performance in history. On the 9th of July at the Lausanne Diamond League, Gatlin ran 9.75 once again and beat Tyson Gay and Asafa Powell by a considerable margin. In his final Diamond League before the World Championships, Gatlin ran 9.78 at the on July 17 at the Monaco Diamond League, setting the Meeting Record.

On August 23, 2015, Gatlin ran 9.77 in his semi-final of the 100 meters at the 2015 World Championships in Athletics in Beijing — the fastest time ever recorded in a preliminary or semi final round in World Championship or Olympic history — and was the heavy favorite to win gold. Gatlin finished second behind Usain Bolt in the final; Bolt's winning time was 9.79 seconds, with Gatlin 0.01 seconds behind. On August 27, 2015, Gatlin finished second behind by Bolt in the final of the 200 meters at the same event, with a time of 19.74 seconds, 0.19 seconds behind Bolt's 19.55 seconds.

On September 11, Gatlin ended his 2015 season with a victory at the Brussels Diamond League and secured the Diamond League trophy for the third consecutive year, winning the 100 meters in a time of 9.98.

=== 2016: Olympic Games silver medalist ===
After beginning the season with Diamond League victories in Shanghai in 9.94, and Eugene in 9.88, Gatlin won the 100 meters in 9.80 seconds and 200 meters in 19.75 seconds at the 2016 United States Olympic Trials, becoming the oldest sprinter to make an American Olympic team.

At the 2016 Rio Olympics, Gatlin received a silver medal in the 100 meters final with a time of 9.89 seconds. Usain Bolt, who won gold, had a time of 9.81 seconds. Gatlin also ran in the qualifying heats of the 200 meters. However, with a time of 20.13 seconds in the semi-finals, he failed to qualify for the final. To qualify for the final, he would have needed to have run 20.09.

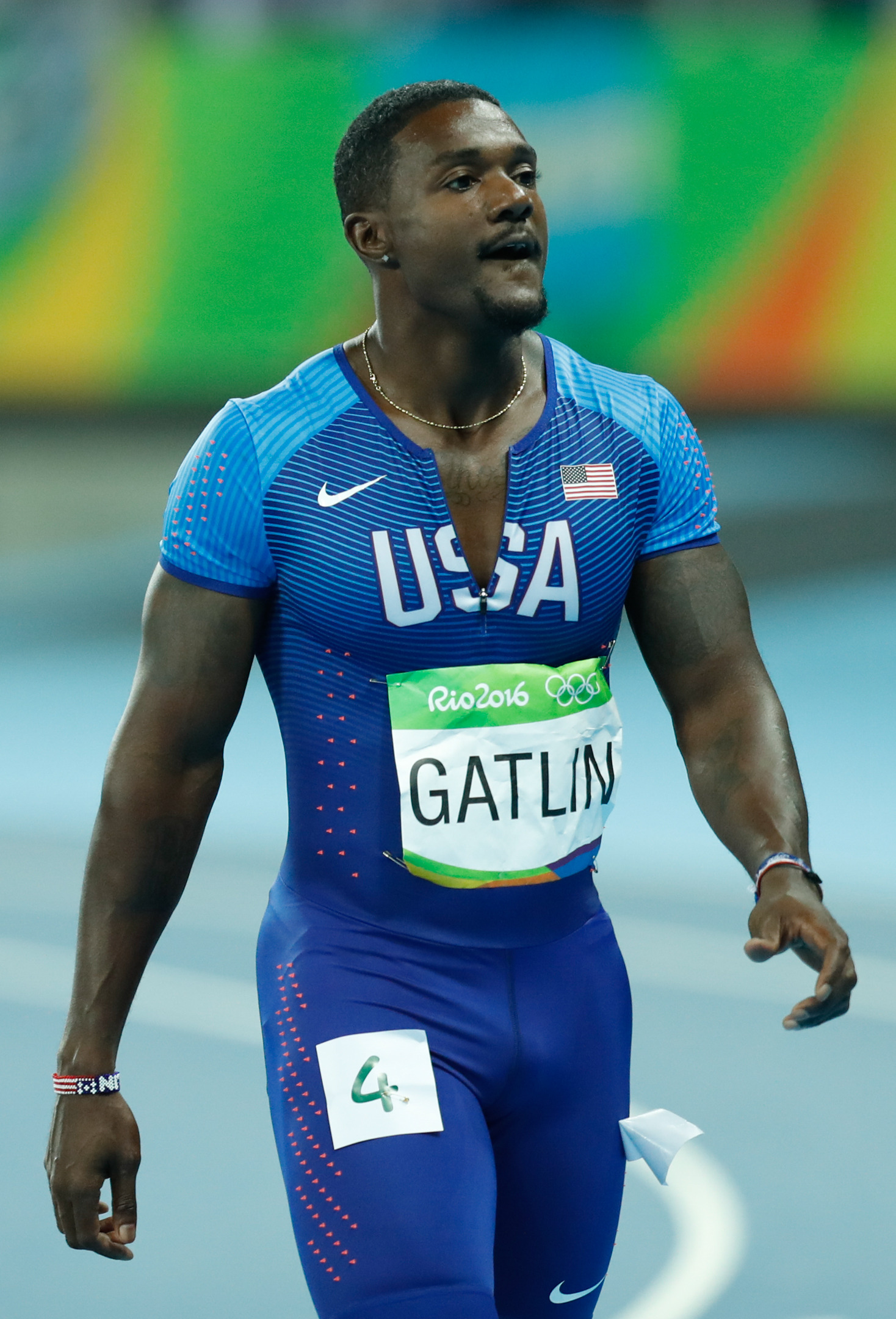
Gatlin at the 2016 Olympics

=== 2017: World Champion and World Relays Champion ===
On April 22, 2017, Gatlin won the gold medal in the 4 × 100 meters relay for the second time in his career at the World Athletics Relays in Nassau, Bahamas. At the 2017 USA Outdoor Track and Field Championships, Justin Gatlin won the 100 meters in 9.95 seconds, beating young favorite Christian Coleman, who clocked 9.98 seconds. In doing so, he broke Kim Collins' World M35 Masters Record of 9.96 seconds, and was 0.02 of a second away from breaking the World Masters All-Time record of 9.93 also from Collins. He opted out of the 200 meters after his Olympic injury, which was caused by a rolled ankle coming off the turn.

Gatlin was a surprise champion at the 2017 World Championships in Athletics, winning gold in the 100 meters in a time of 9.92 seconds, beating Usain Bolt, the fastest sprinter of all time. Despite the crowd being against him, he won the World title twelve years after his first 100m at the 2005 World Championships. He beat his American teammate Christian Coleman, who won the silver, and Usain Bolt (in his final World Championships), who earned the bronze. Several spectators booed at the result, and IAAF President Lord Coe even commented that he should have been banned for life. Usain Bolt, however, condemned the booing as unfair and emphasised that Gatlin worked very hard.

After reports surfaced involving Dennis Mitchell in a doping scandal, Gatlin fired his coach and returned to former coach Brooks Johnson.

=== 2019: 4 × 100 meters World Champion ===
After an off season in 2018 — with no global outdoor championship — Gatlin ran 9.87 seconds in the 100 meters at the Prefontaine Classic in Stanford, California, finishing second to teammate Christian Coleman, who ran a world-leading 9.81. Gatlin's 9.87 improved upon his own world masters record from 9.92, as well as making him the fourth fastest man in the world for that year. In July, it was revealed that Gatlin, along with several of his teammates, were sent to train with Dennis Mitchell again by Nike, despite the recent doping investigations.

Gatlin won the silver medal in the 100 m final at the 2019 World Athletics Championships in an attempt to defend his world title. His time of 9.89s was .13 seconds behind his teammate Christian Coleman, who won gold in 9.76 seconds. At 37 years, 230 days, Gatlin became the oldest sprinter to win a medal in the men's 100 meters at the World Athletics Championships. At the same World Championships, Gatlin was part of the American team who won gold in the 4 × 100 meters relay, the first time he had won the event in his career at World Championships. The American quartet, consisting of Christian Coleman, Noah Lyles, Michael Rodgers and Gatlin, ran a time of 37.10, the fastest-ever by an American team, breaking the previous American record of 37.38 set at the 2012 London Olympics.

=== 2021: Bid for the Tokyo Olympics ===
In 2021, Gatlin attempted to become the oldest man to win a medal in the 100 m by qualifying for the 2020 Summer Olympics in Tokyo, Japan at the age of 39. In April 2021, he won the Tom Jones Memorial Invitational with a time of 9.98 against a field of potential gold medal contenders. At the 2020 US Olympic Trials, Gatlin finished 2nd in his first heat and third in the semifinals to earn a spot in the final. During the final he came up with a hamstring injury and limped across the finish line in last place, ending his chances of qualifying for the Tokyo Olympics.

== Statistics ==
=== Season's Bests ===
| Year | 100 Metres | Year rank | 200 Metres | Year rank |
|---|---|---|---|---|
| 2000 | 10.36 | — | — | — |
| 2001 | 10.08 | 13 | 20.29 | 13 |
| 2003 | 9.97 | 4 | 20.04 | 5 |
| 2004 | 9.85 | 1 | 20.01 | 3 |
| 2005 | 9.88 | 2 | 20.00 | 4 |
| 2010 | 10.09 | 27 | 20.63 | 69 |
| 2011 | 9.95 | 15 | 20.20 | 14 |
| 2012 | 9.79 | 3 | 20.11 | 11 |
| 2013 | 9.85 | 2 | 20.21 | 17 |
| 2014 | 9.77 | 1 | 19.68 | 1 |
| 2015 | **9.74** | 1 | **19.57** | 2 |
| 2016 | 9.80 | 1 | 19.75 | 2 |
| 2017 | 9.92 | 4 | — | — |
| 2018 | 10.03 | 31 | — | — |
| 2019 | 9.87 | 4 | 22.16 | 5638 |
| 2020 | 10.07 | 15 | — | — |
| 2021 | 9.98 | 22 | 20.49 | 100 |

All information from World Athletics profile.

- Year rank indicates the time's rank out of all times set that year (if available).
- **Bold** indicates a lifetime personal best.
- There are no recorded personal season bests for the 2002 and 2006–2009 seasons due to doping bans.

=== Track records ===
As of 14 September 2024, Gatlin holds the following track records for 100 metres and 200 metres.

Performances in red text are wind-assisted.

==== 100 metres ====
| Location | Time | Windspeed m/s | Date |
|---|---|---|---|
| Albi, France | **9.81** | **+4.1** | 15/08/2012 |
| Doha, Qatar | 9.74; PB | +0.9 | 15/05/2015 |
| Kawasaki, Japan | 10.02 | –0.4 | 08/05/2016 |
| Linz, Austria | 9.82 | –0.1 | 14/07/2014 |
| Monaco | 9.78 | –0.3 | 17/07/2015 |
| Nassau, The Bahamas | **9.90** | **+2.3** | 16/04/2016 |
| Rome | 9.75 | +0.9 | 04/06/2015 |
| St. George's, Grenada | 10.05 | +0.5 | 21/04/2018 |

==== 200 metres ====
| Location | Time | Windspeed m/s | Date |
|---|---|---|---|
| Monterrey, Mexico | 20.00 | +0.4 | 11/06/2005 |

== Other ventures ==
He was a regular competitor on Spike TV's show Pros vs Joes, which pitted professional athletes against non-professionals.

In 2011, on the Japanese TV show Kasupe!, Gatlin ran 100 meters in 9.45 seconds (+20 m/s)—faster than Usain Bolt's 9.58 seconds record—assisted by large wind machines blowing at speeds over 25 meters per second. He received 2 million yen (approximately US$25,000) for appearing on the program.

He co-hosts Ready Set Go, a podcast on track and field. The podcast has featured Usain Bolt, Fred Kerley, Asafa Powell, and Gail Devers as guests.

== See also ==
- List of doping cases in athletics
- Men's 100 metres world record progression

Awards
| Preceded by No Award Given | Men's Track & Field ESPY Award; 2006 | Succeeded by Jeremy Wariner |
