= Caimin Douglas =

Dutch Antillean sprinter

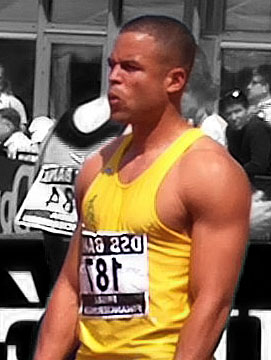
- Douglas in 2007

Personal information
- Full name: Caimin Christian Douglas
- Born: 11 May 1977 (age 49) Rosmalen, North Brabant, Netherlands
- Years active: 1997-present
- Height: 1.79 m (5 ft 10 in)
- Weight: 80 kg (176 lb)

Achievements and titles
- Personal bests: 100m - 10.23 (2002); 200m - 20.48 (2001)
Medal record
Men's athletics
Representing Netherlands
World Championships
Bronze medal – third place	2003 Paris	4x100 m relay
- Updated on 19 October 2007

Caimin Christian Douglas (born 11 May 1977 in Rosmalen, North Brabant) is a Dutch Antillean former sprinter.

== Biography ==
Douglas was born in Rosmalen, to a Dutch mother and an Antillean father. At the age of five the family returned to his father's roots in Curaçao. There he played football from the age of 11 for his local team in Willemstad and the Antillean youth squad. His pace was his main technique on the pitch and this formed the basics for his running career. In 1997 as a newcomer he won the 100 metres and 200 metres during the Curaçao Championships; he also won several other medals at other disciplines during the games. Inspired by fellow Curaçao sportsman Andruw Jones, Douglas ran his first international meeting in Puerto Rico and impressed a delegation of the University of Texas at El Paso. After finishing his civil engineering study in Curaçao he made the move to Texas. During a test race he ran the fastest time ever run over 100 metres at the university and at the end of his first year he was named "All American".

In 2000 Douglas was determined to achieve his international breakthrough, but due to injuries this was set on hold. He kept on fighting and eventually qualified for the 100 and 200 metres at the 2000 Summer Olympics in Sydney representing the Netherlands Antilles. In the series of the 100 metres he did not finish due to a groin injury. He was unable to recover from the injury before the start of the series for the 200 metres and had to cancel his participation. In his final year at the University of Texas at El Paso he won another two "All American" titles and together with his 4 x 100 metres relay team he broke a 29-year-old University record.

In 2001 he became Dutch national champion over 200 metres and qualified for the World Championships in Edmonton, where he reached the second round still representing the Dutch Antilles. After his 2001 outdoor season he decided to represent the Netherlands in the future and defended his 200 metres national title straight away. He ran the qualification times for the European Championships over 100 metres, 200 metres as well as for the 4 x 100 metres relay team, but due to his nationality switch he was not allowed to perform in international competitions for a year.

The next mission of Douglas, together with Patrick van Balkom, Timothy Beck and Troy Douglas was to reach the 2003 World Championships in Athletics in Paris with the 4 x 100 metres relay team. Despite missing the national limit (after already having broken the international limit) with only a few hundreds of a second the Dutch Athletics Association (IAAF) decided to send the team to the World Championships anyway. Douglas missed the series due to toothache and the team with Guus Hoogmoed as his substitute ran a new Dutch record in 38.72 seconds. In the semi-finals Douglas felt fit enough to participate and the record was broken again, to 38.63 this time. In the final, when they ran to the fourth place they came to 38.87 seconds. Due to the positive test of Dwain Chambers the British team that finished second was disqualified and the Dutch were awarded the bronze medal.

With the same team, he participated in the 4 x 100 meters relay at the 2004 Summer Olympics, but they were eliminated in the series due to a mistake at the changing area between him and Van Balkom. In December 2004 he graduated at the University of Texas for his Environmental Science study. After this he moved to the Netherlands to settle himself there and he did not participate in many athletics events that year. In 2006 he achieved a silver medal at the Dutch national indoor championships by finishing second behind Hoogmoed. Douglas became Dutch national champion over 100 metres in 2006 and with a groin injury he still participated in the European Championships in Gothenburg where he disappointed in the individual events, but managed to become eighth with the Dutch national 4 x 100 metres relay team. Just days after the European Championships he had a groin surgery.

After recovering from his injury he won the silver medal over 100 metres and 200 metres in 2007 at the Dutch National Championships. He was unable to qualify himself for the World Championships in Osaka and he also failed to qualify for the individual sprint events for the 2008 Summer Olympics. The 4 x 100 metres relay team together with teammates Maarten Heisen, Patrick van Luijk and Guus Hoogmoed (Gregory Sedoc and Virgil Spier as reserves) did qualify for the Olympics. Initially they finished in 17th position during the qualification process while only the first 16 teams would qualify, but due to the cancellation of the Australian team they were allowed to start in Beijing. In their qualification heat Heisen, Hoogmoed, Van Luijk and Douglas placed third in behind Trinidad and Tobago and Japan, but in front of Brazil. Their time of 38.87 was the fifth fastest out of all sixteen participating nations in the first round and they qualified for the final. In the final, the second baton change between Hoogmoed and Van Luijk failed, resulting in a slow time. They still finished the race to place seventh, before the disqualified Chinese team.

== Personal bests ==
Outdoor

- 100 metres - 10.23 (2002, El Paso)
- 150 metres - 15.83 (2006, Lisse)
- 200 metres - 20.48 (2001, Tilburg)

Indoor

- 50 metres - 5.83 (2006, Liévin)
- 60 metres - 6.69 (2006, Ghent)

== Honours ==
- (silver) 60 metres (indoor) - Dutch National Championships, 2006
- (gold) 100 metres - Dutch National Championships, 2006, 2010
- (silver) 100 metres - Dutch National Championships, 2007
- (gold) 200 metres - Dutch National Championships, 2001, 2002
- (silver) 200 metres - Dutch National Championships, 2007
- (bronze) 4 x 100 metres - World Championships, 2003
