= Troy Douglas =

Bermudian-Dutch sprinter

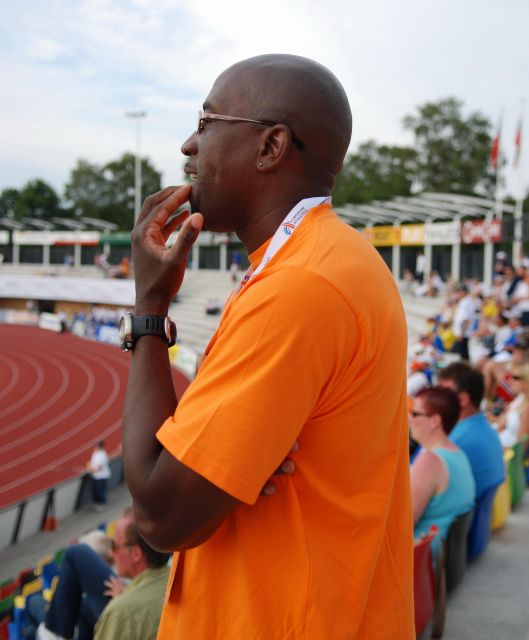
- Troy Douglas, June 2007

Personal information
- Born: 30 November 1962 (age 63) Paget, Bermuda

Sport
- Sport: Track and field
Medal record
Representing Netherlands
World Championships
| Bronze medal – third place | 2003 Paris | 4x100 m relay |
Representing Bermuda
IAAF World Indoor Championships
| Silver medal – second place | 1995 Barcelona | 200 m |
Representing Americas
World Cup
| Silver medal – second place | 1992 Havana | 4x400 m relay |

Troy Douglas (born 30 November 1962) is a former Dutch sprinter. Originally competing for Bermuda, he finished second at the 1995 IAAF World Indoor Championships in the 200 metres event, but he changed nationality to the Netherlands in 1998. For Bermuda he participated at the 1988, 1992 and 1996 Summer Olympics, reaching the semi-finals of the 200 metres in 1996 as well as the semi-finals of the 400 metres in 1992 and 1996. He finished 5th in the final of the 200 metres at the 1991 Pan American Games.

Set to compete in the 1999 World Championships, Douglas was withdrawn after testing positive for the banned anabolic steroid nandrolone. After his suspension he ran his personal best times over 100 metres and 200 metres in 2001 as well as two masters world records on the same distances in 2003. Together with Patrick van Balkom, Timothy Beck and Caimin Douglas he won a bronze medal in the 4×100 metres relay at the 2003 World Championships in Athletics. They also participated with the same team in the 4 x 100 meters relay at the 2004 Summer Olympics, but were eliminated in the series due to a mistake in an exchange and did not qualify for the final.

== Personal bests ==
- 100 metres - 10.19 (2001)
- 200 metres - 20.19 (2001)
- 400 metres - 45.26 (1996)

== Masters World Records ==
- Men's 40-44yo 100 metres - 10.29 secs (7 June 2003)
- Men's 40-44yo 200 metres - 20.64 secs (9 and 27 Aug. 2003)

== See also ==
- List of doping cases in athletics
