= Shawn Crawford =

American sprinter (born 1978)

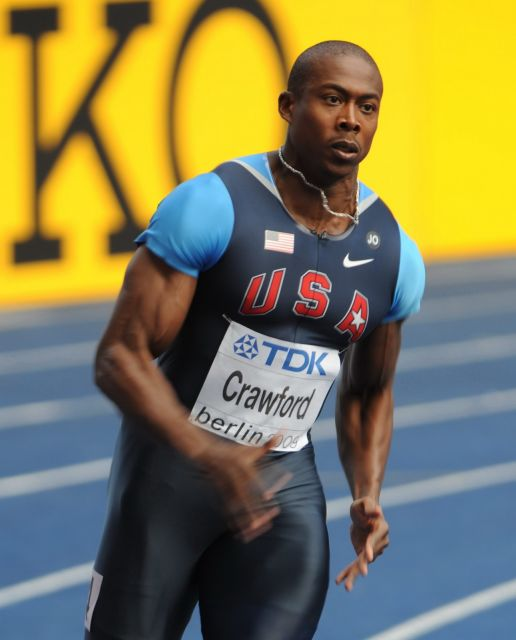
- Shawn Crawford during the 2009 World Championships in Athletics in Berlin

Personal information
- Nationality: American
- Born: January 14, 1978 (age 48) Van Wyck, South Carolina, U.S.
- Height: 5 ft 11 in (1.80 m)
- Weight: 165 lb (75 kg)

Sport
- Sport: Running
- Events: 100 metres, 200 metres
- College team: Clemson

Achievements and titles
- Personal bests: 100 m: 9.88; 200 m: 19.79
Medal record
Men's athletics
Representing the United States
Olympic Games
Gold medal – first place	2004 Athens	200 m
Silver medal – second place	2004 Athens	4 × 100 m relay
Silver medal – second place	2008 Beijing	200 m
World Championships
Bronze medal – third place	2001 Edmonton	200 m
World Indoor Championships
Gold medal – first place	2001 Lisbon	200 m
Silver medal – second place	2004 Budapest	60 m
Goodwill Games
Gold medal – first place	2001 Brisbane	200 m

Shawn Crawford (born January 14, 1978) is a retired American sprint athlete. He competed in the 100 meters and 200 meters events. In the 200 meter sprint, Crawford won gold at the 2004 Summer Olympics and silver at the 2008 Summer Olympics. He originally finished 4th in the race but after the 2nd and 3rd-place winners were disqualified, he moved up to a silver. On April 17, 2013, Crawford was suspended for two years for missing out-of-competition drug tests. His coach, Bob Kersee claimed that Crawford retired after the 2012 United States Olympic Trials and USA Track & Field said he filed retirement papers in 2013.

== Biography ==
Crawford was born in Van Wyck, South Carolina. He attended Indian Land High School before leaving for Clemson University, where he claimed eleven All-America honors and three national championships.

In 2001 Crawford started the year with a victory at the Indoor World Championships in the 200 m. He then went to the World Athletics Championships, where he tied with Kim Collins of Saint Kitts and Nevis for the 200 m bronze medal. At the Goodwill Games, he claimed his second gold medal of the year.

Crawford became known for his outrageous antics and lack of focus. At a 2002 meet in Milan, he donned a Phantom of the Opera mask that obstructed his vision during the 200 m race, causing him to run out of his lane and be disqualified.

In January 2003, Crawford starred in an episode of the Fox TV show Man vs. Beast in which he raced a zebra and a giraffe over 100 m on dirt. In the first race, he easily bested the giraffe. The zebra race was very close. Accusing the zebra of a false start, he re-raced the zebra, getting out of the blocks first and taking a lead. This caused the zebra to speed up, finishing in 9.957 seconds to Crawford's 10.86 seconds. Later he boasted to ESPN the Magazine, "tell the zebra I coulda whooped him." According to the USATF website, Crawford refers to himself as "Cheetah Man." He has publicly expressed his desire to run in war paint and urges spectators to look out for him at every meet.

In March 2004, he was favored to win the 60 meters world indoor title but was defeated by Jason Gardener of Great Britain by three hundredths of a second.

In the trials for the 2004 Summer Olympics, Crawford secured a place on the team by claiming third in the 100 m with a personal best of 9.93 s behind winner Maurice Greene and runner-up Justin Gatlin. Seven days later he placed first in the 200 m with a time of 19.99s, edging out Gatlin; Bernard Williams took third place. In June, Crawford improved on his 100 m personal best by running 9.88s in Eugene, Oregon.

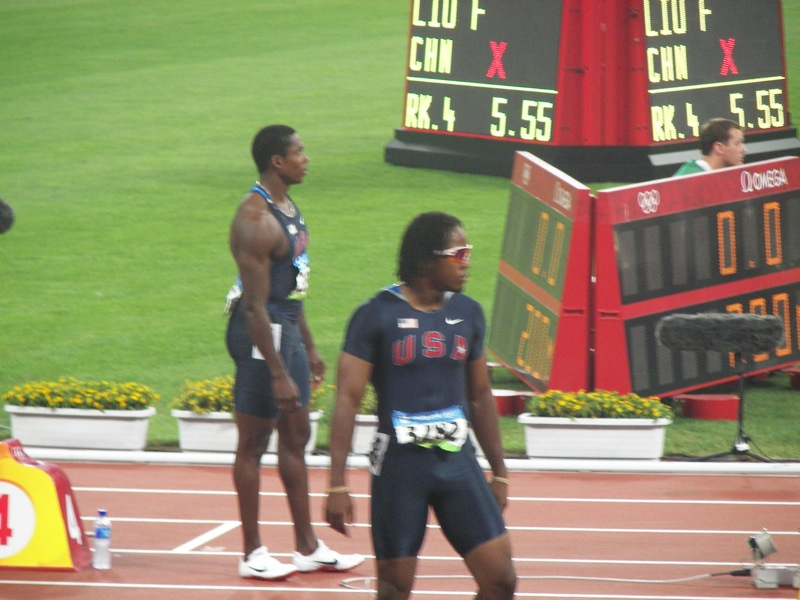
Shawn Crawford (left) and Walter Dix (right) at the 2008 Olympics 200 m final

At the 2004 Summer Olympics in Athens, Crawford ran the 100 m final in 9.89 s, finishing in fourth place just 0.04 s behind first-place finisher Justin Gatlin. That marked the first race in history in which four competitors under 9.90s. Crawford went on to win the gold medal in the 200 m with a time of 19.79 s. He claimed a silver medal as part of the United States 4 × 100 m relay team.

He qualified for the 2008 Summer Olympics in the 200 m dash, finishing second at the trials after failing to qualify in the 100 m. He originally finished fourth in the 200 m final, but was later promoted to 2nd, winning silver, after fellow countryman Wallace Spearmon and Churandy Martina of the Netherlands Antilles were both disqualified for lane infringements. Although initially only Spearmon was disqualified, prompting the United States to consider filing a protest, review of race footage revealed an additional infraction by Martina. On August 28, in a gesture of sportsmanship, Crawford gave his medal to Martina. On March 6, 2009, the Court of Arbitration for Sport rejected an appeal by the National Olympic Committee of the Netherlands Antilles against Martina's disqualification.

Crawford won the 200 m at the 2009 USA Outdoor Track and Field Championships and qualified to represent the United States at the 2009 World Championships in Athletics. He ran 19.89 s in the final of the competition, his best time of the season, but finished fourth behind second-place Alonso Edward of Panama (19.81 s) and third-place Wallace Spearmon (19.85 s). First place finisher Usain Bolt set a new world record of 19.19 s. On April 17, 2013, Crawford was suspended for two years for missing out-of-competition drug tests. His coach, Bob Kersee claimed that Crawford retired after the 2012 United States Olympic Trials and USA Track & Field said he filed retirement papers in 2013.

== Statistics ==
As of 5 July 2009

On 12 April 2002, Crawford became the first man to break ten seconds for the 100 metres for the first time and twenty seconds for the 200 metres for the first time, both on the same day, a feat he achieved in Pretoria, South Africa.

=== Personal bests ===
Event	Time (seconds)	Date	Venue
60 meters	6.47	February 28, 2004	Boston, Massachusetts, United States
100 meters	9.88	June 19, 2004	Eugene, Oregon, United States
200 meters	19.79	August 26, 2004	Athens, Greece
300 meters	32.47	June 7, 2009	Eugene, Oregon, United States

- All information from IAAF Profile

=== Major achievements ===
- 2001
  - World Championships in Athletics – Edmonton, Alberta, Canada.
    - 200 m bronze medalist
  - World Indoor Championships – Lisbon, Portugal.
    - 200 m gold medal
  - Goodwill Games – Brisbane, Australia.
    - 200 m gold medal
- 2004
  - World Indoor Championships – Budapest, Hungary.
    - 60 m silver medal
  - Olympic Games – Athens, Greece.
    - 200 m gold medal
    - 4 × 100 m relay silver medal
- 2008
  - 2008 Summer Olympics 200 m Silver Medal
    - On January 31, 2009, according to the Associated Press "Shawn Crawford confirmed that he gave his Olympic silver medal to Churandy Martina, the sprinter who finished second in the 200 meters but was later disqualified for running out of his lane"

Achievements
Preceded by Joshua J. Johnson	Men's 200 m Best Year Performance alongside (Greece) Konstadinos Kederis; 2002	Succeeded by Bernard Williams
Preceded by Bernard Williams	Men's 200 m Best Year Performance; 2004	Succeeded by Wallace Spearmon
