= Guus Hoogmoed =

Dutch sprinter

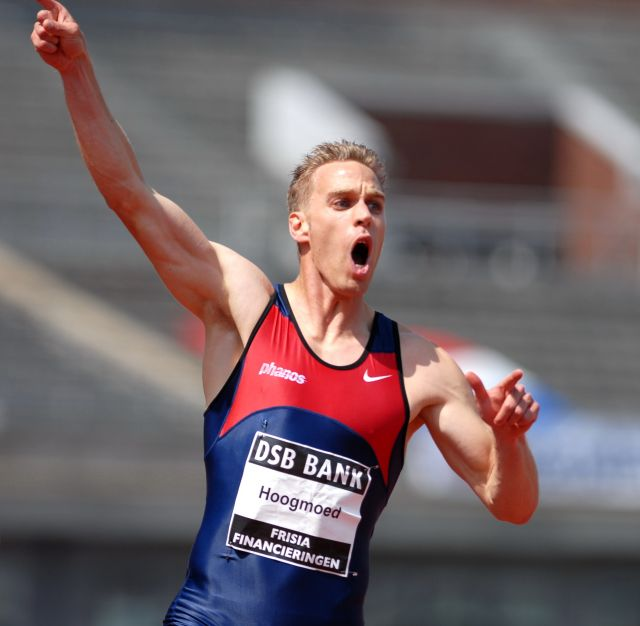

Personal information
- Full name: Guus Houben
- Born: 27 September 1981 (age 44) Utrecht, Netherlands
- Years active: 1993-present
- Height: 1.87
- Weight: 80 kg (176 lb)

Achievements and titles
- Personal best(s): 100m - 10.15 (2007); 200m - 20.48 (2007); 400m - 47.13 (2003)
- Updated on 18 October 2007

Guus Hoogmoed is a retired Dutch sprinter, who specialised in the 100 and 200 metres.

He finished fourth in 60 metres at the 2005 European Indoor Championships and eighth in 4 x 100 metres relay at the 2006 European Championships.

He participated in both 100 metres and 200 metres at the 2005 World Championships, where he reached the quarter finals.

The 4 x 100 metres relay team together with teammates Maarten Heisen, Caimin Douglas and Patrick van Luijk (Gregory Sedoc and Virgil Spier as reserves) did qualify for the Olympics. Initially they finished in 17th position during the qualification process, while only the first 16 teams would qualify, but due to the cancellation of the Australian team they were allowed to start in Beijing. In their qualification heat Heisen, Hoogmoed, Van Luijk and Douglas placed third in behind Trinidad and Tobago and Japan, but in front of Brazil. Their time of 38.87 was the fifth fastest out of all sixteen participating nations in the first round and they qualified for the final. In the final, the second baton change between Hoogmoed and Van Luijk failed, resulting in a slow time. They still finished the race to place seventh, before the disqualified Chinese team.

== Personal bests ==
- 100 metres - 10.15 s (2007)
- 200 metres - 20.48 s (2007)
- 400 metres - 47.13 s (2003)

== Honours ==
- (gold) 100 metres - Dutch National Championships, 2005, 2007
- (gold) 200 metres - Dutch National Championships, 2004, 2005, 2006, 2007
