= Virgil Spier =

Dutch athlete (born 1981)

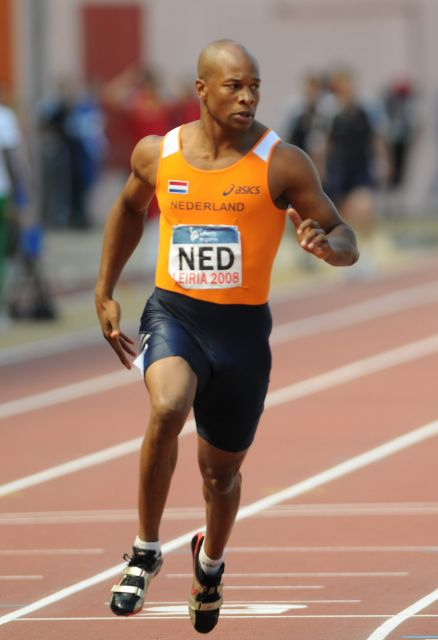

Personal information
- Born: 8 January 1981 (age 45) Amsterdam, Netherlands
- Years active: 2000-present
- Height: 1.84 m (6 ft 0 in)
- Weight: 89 kg (196 lb)
- Updated on August 4, 2008

Virgil Spier (born 8 January 1981) is a Dutch athlete who started at the decathlon, but who is currently active mainly as a sprinter and a hurdler.

== Biography ==
Spier was born in Amsterdam, and started his career as an athlete at Sparta Atletiek in The Hague. At this team he showed to be talented, but his performances were not at the top level yet. Due to this there are no notable results of him as a D, C and B-junior. As an A-junior however he qualified himself at the Dutch National Championships for seniors through a fifth position at the decathlon (7164 points) for the Junior World Championships in Santiago. In Santiago he started with 10.54 over 100 metres, which was the fourth Dutch junior time in history. However, due to a hamstring injury he was unable to continue his tournament.

A year later, in 2001 he was able to represent the Netherlands at the decathlon at the European Under-23 Championships that were held in Amsterdam. Also in this tournament he was suffering from an injury, but still managed to achieve a ninth position overall. In 2002 he came in second at the 60 metres indoor held at the Dutch National Championships. At the same event he reached the fourth place at the 60 metres hurdles. With these performances he qualified himself for the European Indoor Championships in Vienna for both distances. He eventually was eliminated in the first round series in both occasions.

The 4×100 metres relay team consisting of Caimin Douglas, Maarten Heisen, Patrick van Luijk and Guus Hoogmoed, with Gregory Sedoc and Virgil Spier as reserves, did qualify for the Olympics. Initially they finished in 17th position during the qualification process while only the first 16 teams would qualify, but due to the cancellation of the Australian team they were allowed to start in Beijing. In their qualification heat Heisen, Hoogmoed, Van Luijk and Douglas placed third behind Trinidad and Tobago and Japan, but in front of Brazil. Their time of 38.87 was the fifth fastest out of all sixteen participating nations in the first round and they qualified for the final. In the final, the second baton change between Hoogmoed and Van Luijk failed, resulting in a slow time. They still finished the race to place seventh, before the disqualified Chinese team. Spier himself did not participate.

== Personal bests ==
Outdoor

- 100 metres - 10.48 (2001, Hoorn)
- 200 metres - 21.17 (2001, Beijing)
- 110 metres hurdles - 13.79 (2003, Bydgoszcz)
- long jump - 5.87 metres (2000, Santiago)
- shot put - 12.46 metres (2000, Santiago)
- decathlon - 7469 points (2001, Amsterdam)

Indoor

- 50 metres - 5.87 (2003, Zuidbroek)
- 60 metres - 6.70 (2002, Ghent)
- 50 metres hurdles - 6.77 (2004, Zuidbroek)
- 60 metres hurdles - 7.76 (2002, Ghent)
- heptathlon - 5459 points (2001, Prague)

== Honours ==
- (silver) 60 metres (indoor) - Dutch National Championships, 2002
