= Markus Pöyhönen =

Finnish sprinter

Markus Pöyhönen (born 25 October 1978, in Vantaa) is a Finnish former track and field athlete, who specialised in the 100m sprint. Pöyhönen's trainer during his active career was Atte Pettinen.

At the 2002 European Championships in Athletics he became the first Finnish male in history to reach the 100 m sprint final in an international championship event. He finished fifth in the race, though years later Dwain Chambers was disqualified and Pöyhönen's final position was fourth.

He finished seventh in the 60 metres final at the 2003 IAAF World Indoor Championships in Birmingham.

His 100 m personal best, also set in 2002, is 10.23 seconds; 0.02 s shy of the Finnish national record.

== Progression ==
(100 m)

Year	Time	Wind	City	Date
1999	10.88	+1.3	Raahe	14 August 1999
2000	10.56	+1.8	Kouvola	5 August 2000
2001	10.42	+1.2	Jämsänkoski	29 July 2001
2002	10.23	+1.7	Joensuu	20 July 2002
2003	10.26	+1.2	Turku	23 July 2003
2005	10.38	+0.3	Krugersdorp, South Africa	15 January 2005
2006	10.76	+1.8	Tampere	7 June 2006
