= Timothy Beck =

Dutch sprinter (born 1977)

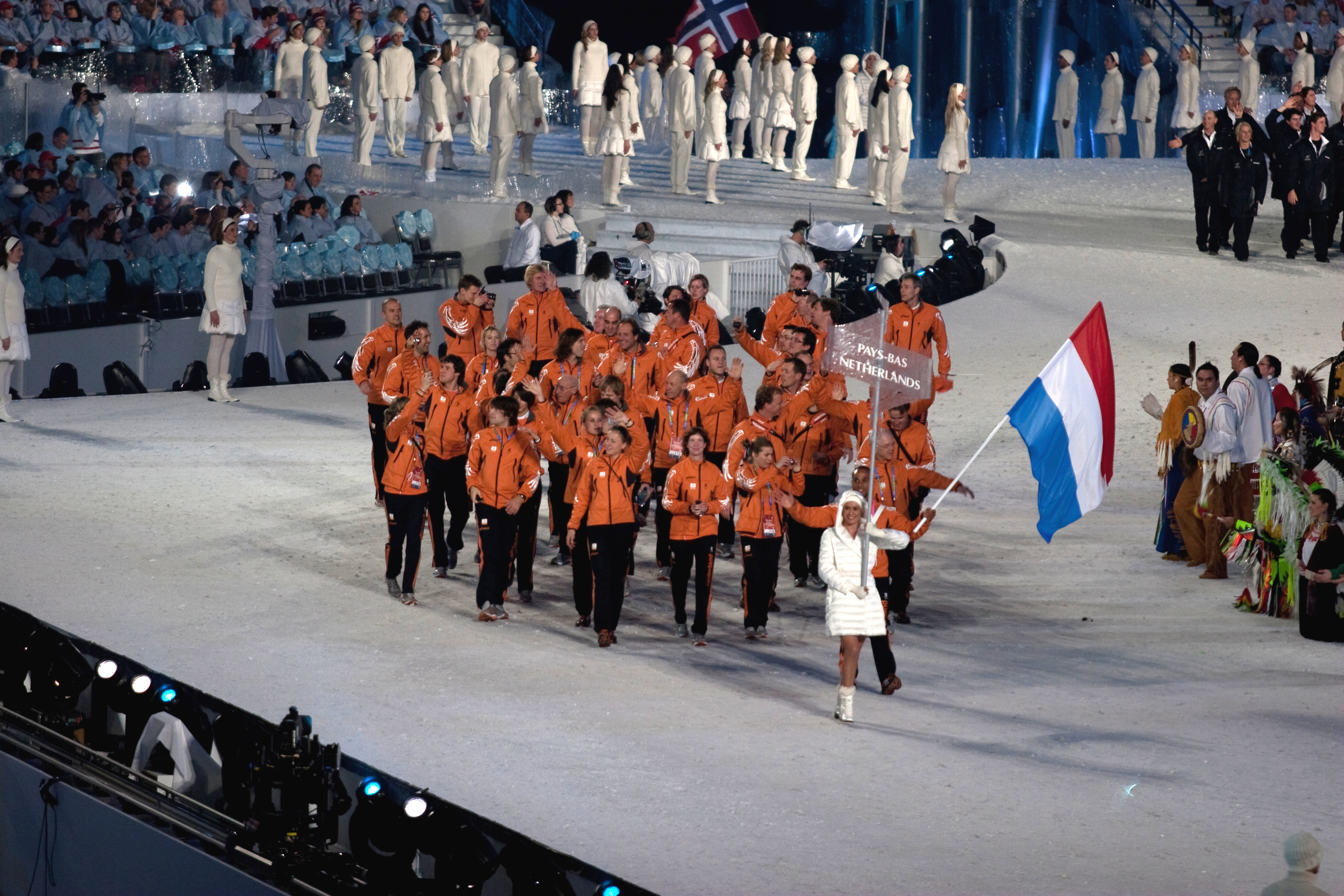
- Timothy Beck carrying the Dutch flag during the opening ceremony of the 2010 Winter Olympics

Personal information
- Born: 1 February 1977 (age 49) Assen, Netherlands

Sport
- Sport: Track and field Bobsleigh
Medal record
Representing Netherlands
Athletics
World Championships
Bronze medal – third place	2003 Paris	4x100 m relay

Timothy Beck (born 1 February 1977) is a Dutch sprinter. Together with Caimin Douglas, Patrick van Balkom and Troy Douglas he won a bronze medal in the 4 x 100 metres relay at the 2003 World Championships in Athletics. With the same team he also participated in the 4 x 100 meters relay at the 2004 Summer Olympics, but due to a mistake in the changing area they did not advance from the series.

Beck also competed as a bobsledder in the 2002 Winter Olympics in Salt Lake City, where he finished in seventeenth position in the Four Men's Bob. He carried the Dutch flag at the opening ceremony of the 2010 Winter Olympics. He is of African-American descent.

== Personal bests ==
- 60 metres – 6.71 (2004)
- 100 metres – 10.43 (2004)
- 200 metres – 21.54 (2003)

Olympic Games
Preceded by Jan Bos	Flagbearer for Netherlands; Vancouver 2010	Succeeded by Jorien ter Mors
