= Maarten Heisen =

Dutch sprinter (born 1984)

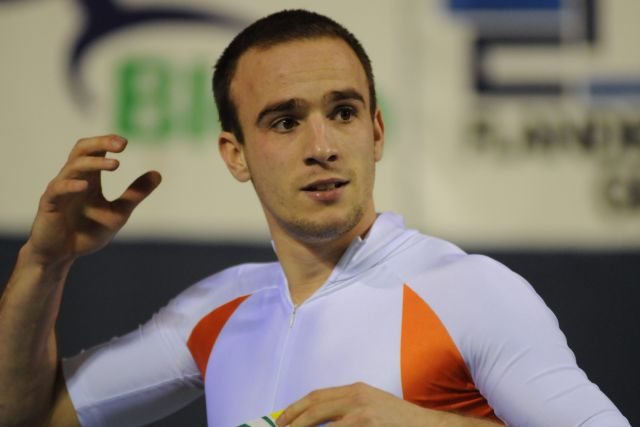

Personal information
- Full name: Maarten Heisen
- Nickname: -
- Born: 11 February 1984 (age 42) Woerden, Netherlands
- Years active: 2000-present
- Height: 1.78 m (5 ft 10 in)
- Weight: 74 kg (163 lb)

Achievements and titles
- Personal bests: 100m - 10.48 (2008); 200m - 21.36 (2004)
- Updated on 4 August 2008

Maarten Heisen (born 11 February 1984 in Woerden) is a Dutch sprinter.

== Biography ==
Heisen started becoming active in athletics at the age of 9. In these early years his career was basically based on making fun. It became clear that he was talented in sprinting as well as at the long jump even though his opponents at that age were quite a bit larger than him.

When he was sixteen he started to become more serious in developing his career and he started training more frequently. As a second year B-junior in 2001 he won his first medals at the national championships: silver at the 60m indoor and bronze at the 100m outdoor. His next goal was to achieve a time under 11 seconds over 100 metres. He succeeded straight away with 10.99, but in his second attempt he already run 10.82 seconds. Nonetheless, he was unable to achieve the limit for the World Junior Championships in Jamaica that was set at 10.74 seconds. Only five days after the deadline he improved his personal best to 10.70, but it was too late to start in Jamaica.

In his last year as a junior Heisen did manage to qualify for the 2003 European Junior Championships in Tampere. He participated in the 100m (where he reached the semi-final) and the 4 × 100 m relay (the team reached the final, but due to an exchanging error between Heisen and Michael Mathew they did not finish).

The following year Heisen participated on senior level, but had a hard time adjusting to the higher level. He reached the finals at the national championships, however he was unable to come close to the podium. He was added to the Dutch Olympic Team selection and learned a lot from the more experienced athletes, specially those that qualified for the 2004 Summer Olympics. In 2005 he suffered with an injury during the start of the year, but he managed to win his first senior medals. He won a silver medal at the 60m indoor and a bronze at the 100m outdoor. He missed out on qualification for the under-23 European Championships and decided to run some international races in Helsinki and Stockholm. His personal best time over 100 metres was improved to 10.52 at the end of 2005.

In 2006 he won the bronze medal during the 60 metres at the Dutch Indoor Championships in Ghent, but apart from that no notable results were achieved. Also in 2007 he did not perform at his best, although he did manage to beat his personal best at the 100 metres to 10.49. Unexpectedly because of his results in the past two years his start in 2008 was very successful. Heisen qualified himself for the World Indoor Championships in Valencia due to a 6.66 at the 60 metres indoor during an international race in Luxembourg. In Valencia he achieved 6.77 to reach the semi-final in which his 6.71 was not enough to qualify for the final and ended up in 16th position overall.

Heisen made his way into the Dutch 4 x 100 metres relay team together with teammates Caimin Douglas, Patrick van Luijk, Guus Hoogmoed, Gregory Sedoc and Virgil Spier. Their aim was to qualify for the 2008 Summer Olympics and initially they finished in 17th position during the qualification process while only the first 16 teams would qualify. Due to the cancellation of the Australian team they were allowed to start in Beijing. In their qualification heat Heisen, Hoogmoed, Van Luijk and Douglas placed third in behind Trinidad and Tobago and Japan, but in front of Brazil. Their time of 38.87 was the fifth fastest out of all sixteen participating nations in the first round and they qualified for the final. In the final, the second baton change between Hoogmoed and Van Luijk failed, resulting in a slow time. They still finished the race to place seventh, before the disqualified Chinese team.

== Personal bests ==
Outdoor

- 100 metres - 10.48 (2008, Bremen)
- 200 metres - 21.36 (2004, Utrecht)

Indoor

- 60 metres - 6.66 (2008, Luxembourg)

== Honours ==
- (silver) 60 metres (indoor) - Dutch National Championships, 2005
- (bronze) 60 metres (indoor) - Dutch National Championships, 2006
- (bronze) 100 metres - Dutch National Championships, 2005
