= Anatoliy Dovhal =

Ukrainian sprinter (born 1976)

Medal record
Men's athletics
Representing Ukraine
European Championships
| Gold medal – first place | 2002 Munich | 4 × 100 metres |
European Indoor Championships
| Bronze medal – third place | 2002 Vienna | 60 m |
Military World Games
| Gold medal – first place | 1999 Zagreb | 100 m |
| Silver medal – second place | 1999 Zagreb | 4 × 100 metres |
European Indoor Cup
| Silver medal – second place | 2006 Liévin | 60 m |

Anatoliy Dovhal (complete name Anatoliy Ivanovych Dovhal'; original name: Анатолій Іванович Довгаль) (born 29 January 1976) is a Ukrainian sprinter, who specializes in the 100 metres.

Dovdal won a bronze medal in 60 metres at the 2002 European Indoor Athletics Championships. His personal best time over this distance is 6.56 seconds.

In 100 m he won the 1999 Military World Games and competed at the 2000 Olympics. His personal best time is 10.17 seconds, achieved in June 2004 in Kyiv.

He won the gold medal in 4 × 100 metres relay at the 2002 European Championships.
